= 2026 New Orleans Saints season =

60th season in franchise history

- Owner: Gayle Benson
- General manager: Mickey Loomis
- President: Dennis Lauscha
- Head coach: Kellen Moore
- Offensive coordinator: Doug Nussmeier
- Defensive coordinator: Brandon Staley
- Home stadium: Caesars Superdome

Results
- Record: 3–7
- Division place: 4th NFC South

Uniform
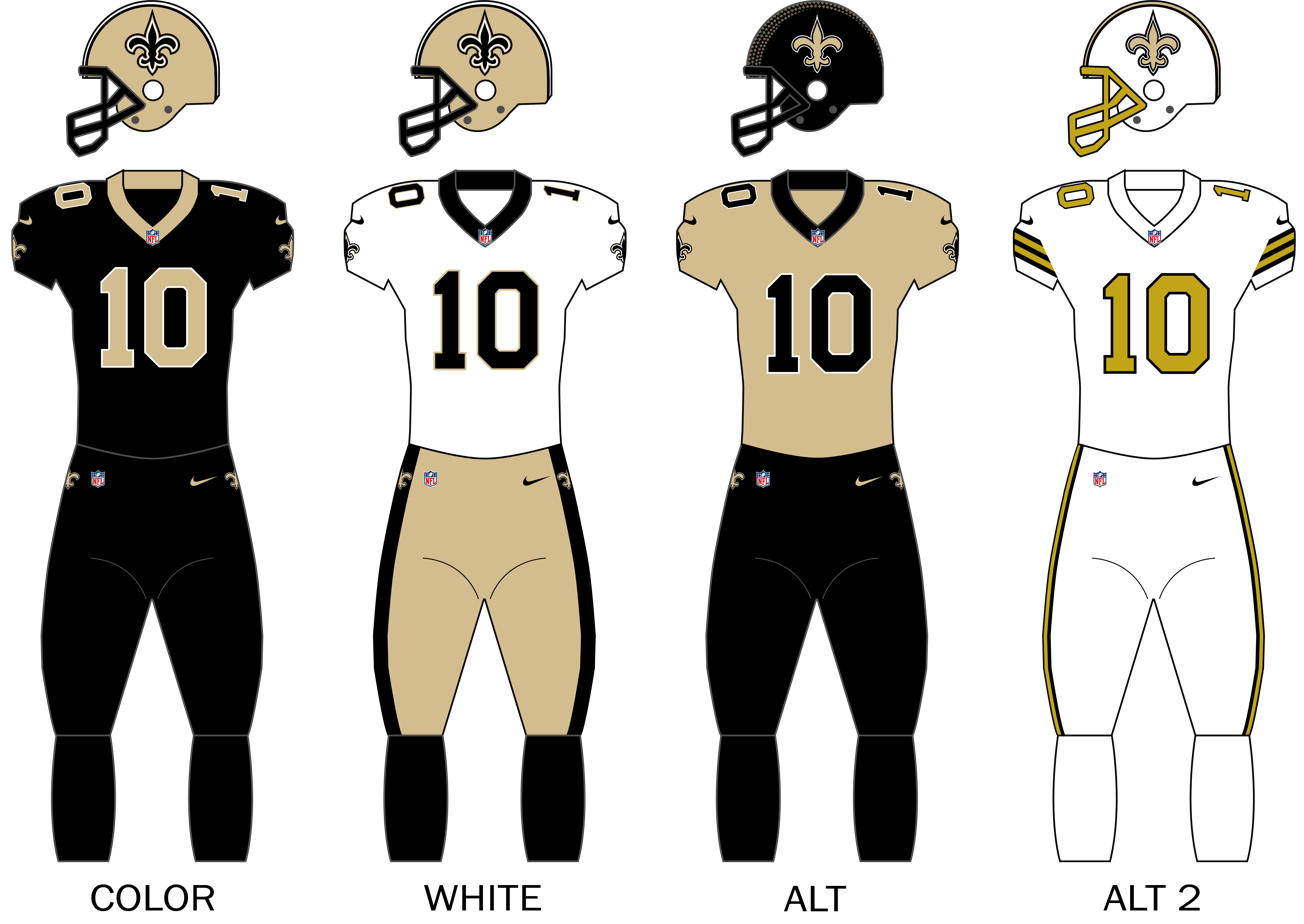

The 2026 season is the New Orleans Saints' 60th in the National Football League (NFL), their 51st to host games at the Caesars Superdome, their 14th under general manager Mickey Loomis and their second under head coach Kellen Moore. The Saints will seek to improve upon their 6–11 record from the previous season and end their five-year drought of both a playoff appearance and an NFC South title.

== Offseason ==
=== Coaching changes ===
2026 New Orleans Saints coaching staff changes
Position	Previous coach(es)	Vacancy reason	Replacement(s)	Source(s)
Assistant offensive line	Jahri Evans, 2025	Hired by Pittsburgh	Vacant	
Offensive assistant	Tobijah Hughley, 2025–	N/A	Tobijah Hughley Will Clapp	

=== Free agents ===
Position	Player	Tag	2026 team	Notes
S	Ugo Amadi	UFA	TBD	TBD
DE	Jonathan Bullard	UFA	Dallas Cowboys	1 year, $2 million
S	Terrell Burgess	UFA	New Orleans Saints	1 year, $1.4 million
MLB	Demario Davis	UFA	New York Jets	2 years, $22 million
CB	Michael Davis	UFA	TBD	TBD
C	Luke Fortner	UFA	Carolina Panthers	1 year, $4.75 million
TE	Taysom Hill	UFA	TBD	TBD
DE	Cameron Jordan	UFA	New Orleans Saints	1 year, $7.5 million
TE	Foster Moreau	UFA	Houston Texans	2 years, $6.3 million
WR	Dante Pettis	UFA	Buffalo Bills	1 year, $1.3 million
TE	Mason Pline	ERFA	Kansas City Chiefs	1 year, $885,000
LG	Dillon Radunz	UFA	New Orleans Saints	2 years, $6.9 million
DT	John Ridgeway III	UFA	New Orleans Saints	2 years, $6.2 million
DE	Chris Rumph II	UFA	New Orleans Saints	1 year, $2 million
TE	Jack Stoll	UFA	Cleveland Browns	1 year, $1.3 million
CB	Alontae Taylor	UFA	Tennessee Titans	3 years, $58 million
DE	Jonah Williams	UFA	Arizona Cardinals	1 year, $1.4 million
LT	Landon Young	UFA	New York Jets	1 year, $1.2 million

=== Signings ===
Position	Player	Tag	2025 team	Date signed	Notes
P	Ryan Wright	UFA	Minnesota Vikings	March 11	4 years, $14 million
RB	Travis Etienne	UFA	Jacksonville Jaguars	March 11	4 years, $52 million
G	David Edwards	UFA	Buffalo Bills	March 11	4 years, $61 million
TE	Noah Fant	UFA	Cincinnati Bengals	March 11	2 years, $8.75 million
LB	Kaden Elliss	UFA	Atlanta Falcons	March 11	3 years, $33 million
RB	Ty Chandler	UFA	Minnesota Vikings	March 17	1 year, $1.2 million
QB	Zach Wilson	UFA	Miami Dolphins	March 25	1 year, $1.4 million
LB	Anfernee Jennings	UFA	New England Patriots	April 26	1 year, $1.4 million
CB	Martin Emerson	UFA	Cleveland Browns	April 28	1 year, $1.5 million

=== Trades ===
Trades below only are for trades that included a player. Draft pick-only trades will go in draft section.

Date	Player(s)/Asset(s) received	Team	Player(s)/Asset(s) traded	Source
March 11	2028 sixth-round selection	Houston Texans	Kai Kroeger, 2028 seventh-round selection	
April 25	Tyree Wilson, 2026 seventh-round selection	Las Vegas Raiders	2026 fifth-round selection	
August 23	Zamir White	San Francisco 49ers	Deion Jones	

== Draft ==
2026 New Orleans Saints draft selections
Round	Selection	Player	Position	College	Notes
1	8	Jordyn Tyson	WR	Arizona State	
2	41	Christen Miller	DT	Georgia	
3	74	Oscar Delp	TE	Georgia	
4	108	Traded to the Denver Broncos (Note: The Saints traded a fourth-round selection (108th overall) and a 2027 seventh-round selection to the Denver Broncos in exchange for WR Devaughn Vele.)			
4	132	Jeremiah Wright	OG	Auburn	From Seahawks (Note: The Saints traded WR/RS Rashid Shaheed to the Seattle Seahawks in exchange for fourth- and fifth-round selections (132nd and 172nd overall).)
4	136	Bryce Lance	WR	North Dakota State	Compensatory selection
5	150	Traded to the Las Vegas Raiders (Note: Traded to the Las Vegas Raiders in exchange for DE Tyree Wilson and a seventh-round selection (219th overall).)			
5	172	Lorenzo Styles Jr.	S	Ohio State	From Seahawks
6	190	Barion Brown	WR	LSU	
7	219	TJ Hall	CB	Iowa	From Raiders
7	224	Traded to the New England Patriots (Note: The Saints traded a seventh-round selection (224th overall) to the New England Patriots in exchange for DT Davon Godchaux.)			

Draft trades

2026 New Orleans Saints undrafted free agents
Name	Position	College	Ref.
CJ Donaldson	RB	Ohio State	
Cody Hardy	TE	NC State	
Zxavian Harris	DT	Ole Miss	
Michael Heldman	DE	Central Michigan	
Alan Herron	OT	Maryland	
DaShawn Jones	CB	Alabama	
Jeremiah McClendon	CB	Southern Illinois	
Brock Rechsteiner	WR	Jacksonville State	
Mason Shipley	K	Texas	
Keeshawn Silver	DT	USC	
Jay'Viar Suggs	DT	Wisconsin	
Alex Wollschlaeger	OT	Kentucky	

== Staff ==
New Orleans Saints staff
Front office: Owner – Gayle Benson; President – Dennis Lauscha; Executive vice president/general manager – Mickey Loomis; Senior VP of football operations/assistant general manager – Khai Harley; Senior VP/assistant general manager – college personnel – Jeff Ireland; Vice president of pro personnel – Michael Parenton; Assistant director of pro scouting - Justin Matthews; Director of football administration – Scott Kuhn; Director of analytics – Zach Stuart; Director of team operations – Derek Stamnos; Senior personnel advisor – Randy Mueller; Consultant - Thomas Dimitroff; Head coaches: Head coach – Kellen Moore; Associate head coach/running backs – Joel Thomas; Assistant to the head coach – Mike Martinez; Offensive coaches: Offensive coordinator – Doug Nussmeier; Run game coordinator – T.J. Paganetti Fired on November 2nd, 2026; Quarterbacks – Scott Tolzien; Wide receivers – Keith Williams; Assistant wide receivers – Kyle Valero; Tight ends – Chase Haslett; Offensive line – Brendan Nugent; Senior offensive assistant – Scott Linehan; Offensive assistant – Tobijah Hughley; Offensive assistant – Will Clapp	Defensive coaches: Defensive coordinator – Brandon Staley; Defensive pass game coordinator – Terry Joseph; Defensive line – Bo Davis; Assistant defensive line – Brian Young; Edges – Jay Rodgers; Linebackers – Peter Sirmon; Assistant linebackers – Adam Gristick; Cornerbacks – Grady Brown; Assistant defensive backs – Robert Blanton; Senior defensive assistant – Peter Giunta; Special teams coaches: Special teams coordinator – Phil Galiano; Assistant special teams – Kyle Wilber; Strength and conditioning: Director of sports science – Ted Rath; Strength and conditioning coach – Matt Clapp; Assistant strength and conditioning – Charles Byrd; Assistant strength and conditioning – Rob Wenning; → Coaching staff → Front office → More NFL staffs

== Current roster ==
New Orleans Saints roster
Quarterbacks (QB): 2 Spencer Rattler; 6 Tyler Shough; 11 Zach Wilson; Running backs (RB): 43 CJ Donaldson; 30 Audric Estimé; 3 Travis Etienne; 41 Alvin Kamara; Wide receivers (WR): 19 Barion Brown RS; 18 Bryce Lance; 12 Chris Olave; 0 Jordyn Tyson; 14 Devaughn Vele; Tight ends (TE): 4 Oscar Delp; 87 Noah Fant; 83 Juwan Johnson	Offensive linemen (OL): 71 Kelvin Banks Jr. T; 76 David Edwards G; 75 Taliese Fuaga T; 73 Easton Kilty T; 78 Erik McCoy C; 74 Mason Murphy T; 72 Asim Richards T; 51 Cesar Ruiz G; 66 Will Sherman G; 65 Jeremiah Wright G; Defensive linemen (DL): 97 Khristian Boyd DT; 91 Vernon Broughton DT; 96 Carl Granderson DE; 33 Anfernee Jennings DE; 94 Cameron Jordan DE; 95 John Ridgeway III DT; 93 Nathan Shepherd DT; 98 Tyree Wilson DE; 50 Colby Wooden DT; 99 Chase Young DE	Linebackers (LB): 55 Kaden Elliss; 53 Jaylan Ford; 58 Chris Rumph II; 44 Isaiah Stalbird; 28 Danny Stutsman; 20 Pete Werner; Defensive backs (DB): 23 Julian Blackmon S; 22 Martin Emerson CB; 31 Jordan Howden S; 1 Kool-Aid McKinstry CB; 42 Michael Reid S; 25 Decamerion Richardson CB; 29 Quincy Riley CB; 7 Jonas Sanker S; 36 Lorenzo Styles Jr. S; Special teams (ST): 39 Charlie Smyth K; 17 Ryan Wright P; 49 Zach Wood LS	Practice squad: 81 Kevin Austin Jr. WR; 40 Fadil Diggs DE; 34 TJ Hall CB; 70 Alan Herron T; 88 Matt Lauter TE; 85 Jalen Moreno-Cropper WR; 56 David Ojabo LB; 38 Jayden Price CB; 47 Jackson Sirmon LB; 67 Colby Sorsdal T; 62 Jay'viar Suggs DT; 13 Cedric Tillman WR; 82 Treyton Welch TE; 26 Zamir White RB; 54 Jonah Williams DE; 79 Alex Wollschlaeger T; Reserve: 90 Bryan Bresee DT (IR); 32 Ty Chandler RB (IR); 80 Moliki Matavao TE (IR); 52 Christen Miller DT (IR); 77 Dillon Radunz G (IR); 64 Nick Saldiveri G (PUP); 84 Stone Smartt TE (PS/I); 15 Mason Tipton WR (PUP); 25 Rejzohn Wright CB (IR) 53 active, 16 practice squad, 9 reserve As of November 21, 2026. Rookies in italics.; Roster; Depth chart; Transactions

== Preseason ==
Week	Date	Opponent	Result	Record	Venue	Recap
1	August 15	Jacksonville Jaguars	L 20–24	0–1	Caesars Superdome	Recap
2	August 22	at Los Angeles Rams	L 0–34	0–2	SoFi Stadium	Recap
3	August 28	at Dallas Cowboys	W 27–24	1–2	AT&T Stadium	Recap

== Regular season ==
=== Schedule ===
Week	Date	Time (CT)	Opponent	Result	Record	Venue	Network	Recap
1	September 13	12:00 p.m.	at Detroit Lions	**L** 30–31 (OT)	0–1	Ford Field	Fox	Recap
2	September 20	12:00 p.m.	at Baltimore Ravens	**W** 24–17	1–1	M&T Bank Stadium	CBS	Recap
3	September 27	3:25 p.m.	Las Vegas Raiders	**L** 27–35	1–2	Caesars Superdome	CBS	Recap
4	October 5	7:15 p.m.	**Atlanta Falcons**	**L** 24–45	1–3	Caesars Superdome	ESPN	Recap
5	October 11	12:00 p.m.	Minnesota Vikings	**L** 13–23	1–4	Caesars Superdome	Fox	Recap
6	October 18	12:00 p.m.	at New York Giants	**W** 34–27	2–4	MetLife Stadium	Fox	Recap
7	October 25	8:30 a.m.	Pittsburgh Steelers	**L** 10–16	2–5	Stade de France (Paris)	NFLN	Recap
8	Bye							
9	November 8	12:00 p.m.	Cleveland Browns	**W** 23–22 (OT)	3–5	Caesars Superdome	CBS	Recap
10	November 15	12:00 p.m.	**Carolina Panthers**	**L** 17–20	3–6	Caesars Superdome	Fox	Recap
11	November 22	12:00 p.m.	at Chicago Bears	**L** 13–21	3–7	Soldier Field	Fox	Recap
12	November 29	12:00 p.m.	at Cincinnati Bengals			Paycor Stadium	CBS	
13	December 6	12:00 p.m.	Green Bay Packers			Caesars Superdome	Fox	
14	December 13	12:00 p.m.	at **Carolina Panthers**			Bank of America Stadium	CBS	
15	December 20	12:00 p.m.	at **Tampa Bay Buccaneers**			Raymond James Stadium	Fox	
16	December 27	12:00 p.m.	Arizona Cardinals			Caesars Superdome	Fox	
17	January 3	12:00 p.m.	at **Atlanta Falcons**			Mercedes-Benz Stadium	Fox	
18	January 9/10	TBD	**Tampa Bay Buccaneers**			Caesars Superdome	TBD	

Notes

- Intra-division opponents are in **bold** text.
- Networks, dates and times from Weeks 13–17 are subject to change as a result of flexible scheduling.
- The date, time and network for Week 18 will be finalized at the end of Week 17.

=== Game summaries ===
==== Week 1: at Detroit Lions ====
Week 1: New Orleans Saints at Detroit Lions – Game summary

Quarter	1	2	3	4	OT	Total
Saints	0	0	14	10	6	**30**
**Lions**	7	0	14	3	7	**31**

at Ford Field, Detroit, Michigan

- Date: September 13
- Game time: 1:00 p.m. EDT/12:00 p.m. CDT
- Game weather: None (indoor stadium)
- Game attendance: 62,897
- Referee: Alan Eck
- TV announcers (Fox): Kenny Albert, Jonathan Vilma and Megan Olivi
- Recap, Game Book

Game information

**First quarter**

- DET – Jahmyr Gibbs 1-yard run (Jake Bates kick), 3:39. Lions 7–0. **Drive: 13 plays, 89 yards, 6:25.**

**Second quarter**

- No scoring plays

**Third quarter**

- DET – Jahmyr Gibbs 1-yard run (Jake Bates kick), 11:14. Lions 14–0. **Drive: 7 plays, 41 yards, 3:37.**
- DET – Amon-Ra St. Brown 19-yard pass from Jared Goff (Jake Bates kick), 8:54. Lions 21–0. **Drive: 3 plays, 25 yards, 0:51.**
- NO – Kendre Miller 8-yard run (Daniel Carlson kick), 4:27. Lions 21–7. **Drive: 9 plays, 79 yards, 4:27.**
- NO – Devaughn Vele 1-yard pass from Tyler Shough (Daniel Carlson kick), 0:28. Lions 21–14. **Drive: 7 plays, 54 yards, 2:52.**

**Fourth quarter**

- NO – Daniel Carlson 28-yard field goal, 7:41. Lions 21–17. **Drive: 11 plays, 66 yards, 5:22.**
- DET – Jake Bates 23-yard field goal, 2:32. Lions 24–17. **Drive: 8 plays, 45 yards, 5:09.**
- NO – Juwan Johnson 9-yard pass from Tyler Shough (Daniel Carlson kick), 1:07. Tied 24–24. **Drive: 8 plays, 75 yards, 1:25.**

**Overtime**

- DET – Amon-Ra St. Brown 4-yard pass from Jared Goff (Jake Bates kick), 5:04. Lions 31–24. **Drive: 10 plays, 70 yards, 4:56.**
- NO – Noah Fant 8-yard pass from Tyler Shough (pass failed), 1:34. Lions 31–30. **Drive: 10 plays, 80 yards, 3:30.**

**Top passers**

- NO – Tyler Shough – 35/56, 410 yards, 3 TD, 2 INT
- DET – Jared Goff – 26/39, 206 yards, 2 TD

**Top rushers**

- NO – Travis Etienne – 9 rushes, 46 yards
- DET – Jahmyr Gibbs – 29 rushes, 156 yards, 2 TD

**Top receivers**

- NO – Chris Olave – 10 receptions, 182 yards
- DET – Amon-Ra St. Brown – 10 receptions, 67 yards, 2 TD

Despite starting the game in a 21–0 hole, the Saints outscored the Lions 30–10 in the second half and overtime. However, they were unable to successfully complete the two-point conversation in overtime and they started 0–1 for the second consecutive season. The most controversial moment of the game came when the Saints recovered a strip-sack fumble and returned it for a touchdown only to see it negated when Jared Goff's backwards throw was ruled an incomplete pass.

==== Week 2: at Baltimore Ravens ====
Week 2: New Orleans Saints at Baltimore Ravens – Game summary

Quarter	1	2	3	4	Total
**Saints**	0	6	3	15	**24**
Ravens	7	7	3	0	**17**

at M&T Bank Stadium, Baltimore, Maryland

- Date: September 20
- Game time: 1:00 p.m. EDT/12:00 p.m. CDT
- Game weather: Cloudy, 77 °F (25 °C)
- Game attendance: 70,437
- Referee: Clete Blakeman
- TV announcers (CBS): Spero Dedes, Adam Archuleta and Aditi Kinkhabwala
- Recap, Game Book

Game information

**First quarter**

- BAL – Derrick Henry 1-yard run (Tyler Loop kick), 2:52. Ravens 7–0. **Drive: 12 plays, 76 yards, 6:51.**

**Second quarter**

- NO – Daniel Carlson 23-yard field goal, 3:46. Ravens 7–3. **Drive: 12 plays, 56 yards, 6:24.**
- BAL – Rashod Bateman 22-yard pass from Lamar Jackson (Tyler Loop kick), 0:24. Ravens 14–3. **Drive: 10 plays, 80 yards, 3:22.**
- NO – Daniel Carlson 47-yard field goal, 0:00. Ravens 14–6. **Drive: 4 plays, 15 yards, 0:24.**

**Third quarter**

- NO – Daniel Carlson 51-yard field goal, 11:00. Ravens 14–9. **Drive: 8 plays, 41 yards, 4:00.**
- BAL – Tyler Loop 49-yard field goal, 3:23. Ravens 17–9. **Drive: 14 plays, 37 yards, 7:37.**

**Fourth quarter**

- NO – Chris Olave 21-yard pass from Tyler Shough (Travis Etienne run), 0:24. Tied 17–17. **Drive: 9 plays, 68 yards, 5:18.**
- NO – Tyler Shough 1-yard run (Daniel Carlson kick), 1:28. Saints 24–17. **Drive: 16 plays, 68 yards, 6:38.**

**Top passers**

- NO – Tyler Shough – 27/34, 252 yards, TD
- BAL – Lamar Jackson – 21/31, 235 yards, TD, INT

**Top rushers**

- NO – Travis Etienne – 8 rushes, 25 yards
- BAL – Derrick Henry – 16 rushes, 68 yards, TD

**Top receivers**

- NO – Chris Olave – 8 receptions, 86 yards, TD
- BAL – Rashod Bateman – 7 receptions, 88 yards, TD

==== Week 3: vs. Las Vegas Raiders ====
Week 3: Las Vegas Raiders at New Orleans Saints – Game summary

Quarter	1	2	3	4	Total
**Raiders**	3	13	6	13	**35**
Saints	6	7	14	0	**27**

at Caesars Superdome, New Orleans, Louisiana

- Date: September 27
- Game time: 12:00 p.m. CDT
- Game weather: None (indoor stadium)
- Game attendance: 70,006
- Referee: Adrian Hill
- TV announcers (CBS): Chris Lewis, Luke Kuechly and Amanda Balionis
- Recap, Game Book

Game information

**First quarter**

- LV – Matt Gay 41-yard field goal, 7:35. Raiders 3–0. **Drive: 12 plays, 53 yards, 6:32.**
- NO – Juwan Johnson 2-yard pass from Tyler Shough (kick blocked), 0:50. Saints 6–3. **Drive: 13 plays, 79 yards, 6:45.**

**Second quarter**

- LV – Matt Gay 37-yard field goal, 11:27. Tied 6–6. **Drive: 9 plays, 42 yards, 4:23.**
- LV – Michael Mayer 3-yard pass from Kirk Cousins (Matt Gay kick), 5:46. Raiders 13–6. **Drive: 8 plays, 53 yards, 3:45.**
- NO – Noah Fant 3-yard pass from Tyler Shough (Daniel Carlson kick), 1:54. Tied 13–13. **Drive: 10 plays, 72 yards, 3:52.**
- LV – Matt Gay 25-yard field goal, 0:00. Raiders 16–13. **Drive: 11 plays, 58 yards, 1:54.**

**Third quarter**

- NO – Juwan Johnson 1-yard pass from Tyler Shough (Daniel Carlson kick), 6:40. Saints 20–16. **Drive: 12 plays, 87 yards, 6:50.**
- NO – Noah Fant 16-yard pass from Tyler Shough (Daniel Carlson kick), 5:46. Saints 27–16. **Drive: 2 plays, 32 yards, 0:47.**
- LV – Mike Washington Jr. 36-yard run (pass failed), 3:20. Saints 27–22. **Drive: 5 plays, 71 yards, 2:26.**

**Fourth quarter**

- LV – Cody White 4-yard pass from Kirk Cousins (pass failed), 9:21. Raiders 28–27. **Drive: 6 plays, 55 yards, 3:34.**
- LV – Brock Bowers 4-yard pass from Kirk Cousins (Daniel Carlson kick), 6:22. Raiders 35–27. **Drive: 3 plays, 4 yards, 1:26.**

**Top passers**

- LV – Kirk Cousins – 22/33, 248 yards, 3 TD
- NO – Tyler Shough – 29/42, 255 yards, 4 TD, INT

**Top rushers**

- LV – Ashton Jeanty – 19 rushes, 56 yards
- NO – Travis Etienne – 13 rushes, 57 yards

**Top receivers**

- LV – Brock Bowers – 10 receptions, 116 yards, TD
- NO – Chris Olave – 9 receptions, 107 yards

==== Week 4: vs. Atlanta Falcons ====
Week 4: Atlanta Falcons at New Orleans Saints – Game summary

Quarter	1	2	3	4	Total
**Falcons**	14	10	7	14	**45**
Saints	0	7	3	14	**24**

at Caesars Superdome, New Orleans, Louisiana

- Date: October 5
- Game time: 7:15 p.m. CDT
- Game weather: None (indoor stadium)
- Game attendance: 70,007
- Referee: Land Clark
- TV announcers (ESPN): Joe Buck, Troy Aikman and Lisa Salters
- Recap, Game Book

Game information

**First quarter**

- ATL – Bijan Robinson 59-yard run (Nick Folk kick), 13:34. Falcons 7–0. **Drive: 3 plays, 80 yards, 1:26.**
- ATL – Bijan Robinson 4-yard run (Nick Folk kick), 0:48. Falcons 14–0. **Drive: 5 plays, 22 yards, 1:59.**

**Second quarter**

- NO – Alvin Kamara 3-yard run (Daniel Carlson kick), 14:57. Falcons 14–7. **Drive: 3 plays, 54 yards, 0:51.**
- ATL – Brian Robinson Jr. 4-yard run (Nick Folk kick), 8:59. Falcons 21–7. **Drive: 10 plays, 65 yards, 5:58.**
- ATL – Nick Folk 29-yard field goal, 3:07. Falcons 24–7. **Drive: 10 plays, 75 yards, 4:45.**

**Third quarter**

- NO – Daniel Carlson 27-yard field goal, 7:38. Falcons 24–10. **Drive: 13 plays, 59 yards, 7:22.**
- ATL – Brian Robinson Jr. 8-yard run (Nick Folk kick), 2:11. Falcons 31–10. **Drive: 9 plays, 74 yards, 5:27.**

**Fourth quarter**

- NO – Alvin Kamara 5-yard run (Daniel Carlson kick), 13:00. Falcons 31–17. **Drive: 13 plays, 68 yards, 4:11.**
- ATL – Jahan Dotson 31-yard pass from Michael Penix Jr. (Nick Folk kick), 9:50. Falcons 38–17. **Drive: 5 plays, 72 yards, 3:10.**
- ATL – Brian Robinson Jr. 11-yard run (Nick Folk kick), 6:52. Falcons 45–17. **Drive: 3 plays, 21 yards, 1:37.**
- NO – Devaughn Vele 3-yard pass from Tyler Shough (Daniel Carlson kick), 1:13. Falcons 45–24. **Drive: 13 plays, 76 yards, 5:39.**

**Top passers**

- ATL – Michael Penix Jr. – 15/20, 223 yards, TD
- NO – Tyler Shough – 30/48, 286 yards, TD

**Top rushers**

- ATL – Bijan Robinson – 19 rushes, 145 yards, 2 TD
- NO – Alvin Kamara – 7 rushes, 23 yards, 2 TD

**Top receivers**

- ATL – Drake London – 5 receptions, 96 yards
- NO – Chris Olave – 8 receptions, 116 yards

This marked the Saints' largest home loss to the Falcons since 1999.

==== Week 5: vs. Minnesota Vikings ====
Week 5: Minnesota Vikings at New Orleans Saints – Game summary

Quarter	1	2	3	4	Total
**Vikings**	3	3	7	10	**23**
Saints	0	7	6	0	**13**

at Caesars Superdome, New Orleans, Louisiana

- Date: October 11
- Game time: 12:00 p.m. CDT
- Game weather: None (indoor stadium)
- Game attendance: 70,006
- Referee: John Hussey
- TV announcers (Fox): Adam Amin, Drew Brees and Kristina Pink
- Recap, Game Book

Game information

**First quarter**

- MIN – Will Reichard 40-yard field goal, 9:04. Vikings 3–0. **Drive: 9 plays, 51 yards, 5:56.**

**Second quarter**

- NO – Kendre Miller 2-yard run (Daniel Carlson kick), 8:23. Saints 7–3. **Drive: 15 plays, 66 yards, 7:18.**
- MIN – Will Reichard 54-yard field goal, 0:00. Saints 7–6. **Drive: 7 plays, 33 yards, 1:49.**

**Third quarter**

- MIN – Justin Jefferson 15-yard pass from Kyler Murray (Will Reichard kick), 12:06. Vikings 13–7. **Drive: 6 plays, 37 yards, 2:47.**
- NO – Jonas Sanker 87-yard fumble return (kick failed), 2:34. Tied 13–13. **Drive: 9 plays, 24, yards, 5:01.**

**Fourth quarter'**

- MIN – Aaron Jones 8-yard run (Will Reichard kick), 14:06. Vikings 20–13. **Drive: 6 plays, 70 yards, 3:28.**
- MIN – Will Reichard 55-yard field goal, 7:01. Vikings 23–13. **Drive: 9 plays, 31 yards, 5:48.**

**Top passers**

- MIN – Kyler Murray – 24/30, 229 yards, TD
- NO – Tyler Shough – 16/25, 96 yards, 2 INT

**Top rushers**

- MIN – Aaron Jones – 25 rushes, 113 yards, TD
- NO – Kendre Miller – 10 rushes, 30 yards, TD

**Top receivers**

- MIN – Justin Jefferson – 6 receptions, 79 yards, TD
- NO – Chris Olave – 4 receptions, 46 yards

==== Week 6: at New York Giants ====
Week 6: New Orleans Saints at New York Giants – Game summary

Quarter	1	2	3	4	Total
**Saints**	0	10	17	7	**34**
Giants	7	3	0	17	**27**

at MetLife Stadium, East Rutherford, New Jersey

- Date: October 18
- Game time: 12:00 p.m. CDT
- Game weather: Fair, 56 °F (13 °C)
- Game attendance: 82,905
- Referee: Alex Kemp
- TV announcers (Fox): Adam Amin, Drew Brees and Kristina Pink
- Recap, Game Book

Game information

**First quarter**

- NYG – Tyrone Tracy Jr. 17-yard pass from Jameis Winston (Dominic Zvada kick), 5:14. Giants 7–0. **Drive: 12 plays 93 yards, 6:44.**

**Second quarter**

- NYG – Dominic Zvada 34-yard field goal, 2:27. Giants 10–0. **Drive: 10 plays, 39 yards, 4:24.**
- NO – Daniel Carlson 58-yard field goal, 1:18. Giants 10–3. **Drive: 7 plays, 16 yards, 1:07.'**
- NO – Bryce Lance 2-yard pass from Tyler Shough (Daniel Carlson kick), 0:01. Tied 10–10. **Drive: 5 plays, 28 yards, 1:10.**

**Third quarter**

- NO – Alvin Kamara 31-yard pass from Tyler Shough (Daniel Carlson kick), 12:21. Saints 17–10. **Drive: 5 plays, 79 yards, 2:39.**
- NO – Tyler Shough 1-yard rush (Daniel Carlson kick), 5:43. Saints 24–10. **Drive: 9 plays, 52 yards, 4:49.'**
- NO – Daniel Carlson 51-yard field goal, 1:12. Saints 27–10. **Drive: 6 plays, 30 yards, 3:04.'**

**Fourth quarter**

- NO – Chris Olave 18-yard pass from Tyler Shough (Daniel Carlson kick), 11:31. Saints 34–10. **Drive: 2 plays, 21 yards, 0:48.**
- NYG – Tyrone Tracy Jr. 5-yard run (J. J. McCarthy–Isaiah Likely), 7:00. Saints 34–18. **Drive: 6 plays, 52 yards, 2:31.**
- NYG – Isaiah Likely 24-yard pass from J. J. McCarthy (pass failed), 5:06. Saints 34–24. **Drive: 3 plays, 73 yards, 0:48.**
- NYG – Dominic Zvada 41-yard field goal, 2:04. Saints 34–27. **Drive: plays, 69 yards, 1:55.**

**Top passers**

- NO – Tyler Shough – 16/30, 144 yards, 3 TD
- NYG – J. J. McCarthy – 11/21, 243 yards, TD, INT

**Top rushers**

- NO – Kendre Miller – 20 rushes, 70 yards
- NYG – J. J. McCarthy – 2 rushes, 26 yards

**Top receivers**

- NO – Chris Olave – 4 receptions, 43 yards, TD
- NYG – Malik Nabers – 12 receptions, 165 yards

==== Week 7: vs. Pittsburgh Steelers ====
NFL Paris Game

Week 7: Pittsburgh Steelers at New Orleans Saints – Game summary

Quarter	1	2	3	4	Total
**Steelers**	3	10	3	0	**16**
Saints	0	10	0	0	**10**

at Stade de France, Paris, France

- Date: October 25
- Game time: 2:30 p.m. CET/8:30 a.m. CDT
- Game weather: Partly cloudy, 59 °F (15 °C) (fixed roof)
- Game attendance: 78,488
- Referee: Bill Vinovich
- TV announcers (WDSU/NFLN): Dave Pasch, Kurt Warner, Jason Kelce and Molly McGrath
- Recap, Game Book

Game information

**First quarter**

- PIT – Chris Boswell 28-yard field goal, 10:51. Steelers 3–0. **Drive: 8 plays, 51 yards, 4:09.**

**Second quarter**

- NO – Daniel Carlson 38-yard field goal, 10:17. Tied 3–3. **Drive: 7 plays, 62 yards, 3:00.**
- PIT – Darnell Washington 4-yard pass from Aaron Rodgers (Chris Boswell kick), 6:45. Steelers 10–3. **Drive: 6 plays, 77 yards, 3:32.**
- NO – Devaughn Vele 1-yard pass from Tyler Shough (Daniel Carlson kick), 1:45. Tied 10–10. **Drive: 12 plays, 52 yards, 5:00.**
- PIT – Chris Boswell 47-yard field goal, 0:00. Steelers 13–10. **Drive: 11 plays, 40 yards, 1:45.**

**Third quarter**

- PIT – Chris Boswell 39-yard field goal, 0:14. Steelers 16–10. **Drive: 14 plays, 51 yards, 7:18.**

**Fourth quarter**

- No scoring plays

**Top passers**

- PIT – Aaron Rodgers – 19/30, 212 yards, TD
- NO – Tyler Shough – 30/38, 278 yards, TD, INT

**Top rushers**

- PIT – Jaylen Warren – 18 rushes, 101 yards
- NO – Tyler Shough – 3 rushes, 7 yards

**Top receivers**

- PIT – DK Metcalf – 2 receptions, 56 yards
- NO – Alvin Kamara – 7 receptions, 57 yards

==== Week 9: vs. Cleveland Browns ====
Week 9: Cleveland Browns at New Orleans Saints – Game summary

Quarter	1	2	3	4	OT	Total
Browns	0	3	3	10	6	**22**
**Saints**	3	0	3	10	7	**23**

at Caesars Superdome, New Orleans, Louisiana

- Date: November 8
- Game time: 12:00 p.m. CST
- Game weather: None (indoor stadium)
- Game attendance: 70,182
- Referee: Shawn Hochuli
- TV announcers (CBS): Andrew Catalon, Logan Ryan and AJ Ross
- Recap, Game Book

Game information

**First quarter**

- NO – Charlie Smyth 30-yard field goal, 7:20. Saints 3–0. **Drive: 8 plays, 51 yards, 5:08.**

**Second quarter**

- CLE – Andre Szmyt 41-yard field goal, 10:30. Tied 3–3. **Drive: 9 plays, 35 yards, 4:38.**

**Third quarter**

- CLE – Andre Szmyt 30-yard field goal, 9:01. Browns 6–3. **Drive: 8 plays, 66 yards, 4:22.**
- NO – Charlie Smyth 27-yard field goal, 2:26. Tied 6–6. **Drive: 13 plays, 54 yards, 6:35.**

**Fourth quarter**

- NO – KC Concepcion 64-yard pass from Shedeur Sanders (Andre Szmyt kick), 5:21. Browns 13–9. **Drive: 1 plays, 64 yards, 0:17.**
- CLE – Audric Estimé 2-yard run (Charlie Smyth kick), 0:58. Saints 16–13. **Drive: 6 plays, 55 yards, 0:50.**
- NO – Charlie Smyth 30-yard field goal, 7:20. Saints 3–0. **Drive: 6 plays, 55 yards, 0:50.**
- CLE – Andre Szmyt 51-yard field goal, 0:08. Tied 16–16. **Drive: 7 plays, 41 yards, 0:50.**

**Overtime**

- NO – Juwan Johnson 15-yard pass from Tyler Shough (Charlie Smyth kick), 4:17. Saints 23–16. **Drive: 11 plays, 74 yards, 5:43.**
- CLE – Harold Fannin Jr. 39-yard pass from Shedeur Sanders (pass failed), 1:00. Saints 23–22. **Drive: 8 plays, 67 yards, 3:17.**

**Top passers**

- CLE – Deshaun Watson – 19/31, 297 yards, 2 TD
- NO – Tyler Shough – 21/35, 265 yards, TD

**Top rushers**

- CLE – Quinshon Judkins – 15 rushes, 43 yards
- NO – Audric Estimé – 15 rushes, 72 yards, TD

**Top receivers**

- CLE – Denzel Boston – 6 receptions, 98 yards
- NO – Chris Olave – 7 receptions, 98 yards

==== Week 10: vs. Carolina Panthers ====
Week 10: Carolina Panthers at New Orleans Saints – Game summary

Quarter	1	2	3	4	Total
**Panthers**	0	7	3	10	**20**
Saints	0	0	7	10	**17**

at Caesars Superdome, New Orleans, Louisiana

- Date: November 15
- Game time: 12:00 p.m. CST
- Game weather: None (indoor stadium)
- Game attendance: 70,019
- Referee: Duane Heydt
- TV announcers (Fox): Kevin Kugler, Daryl Johnston and Allison Williams
- Recap Game Book

Game information

**First quarter**

- No scoring plays

**Second quarter**

- CAR – Chuba Hubbard 2-yard run (Ryan Fitzgerald kick), 6:43. Panthers 7–0. **Drive: 11 plays 56 yards, 4:46.**

**Third quarter**

- NO – Alvin Kamara 3-yard run (Charlie Smyth kick), 6:33. Tied 7–7. **Drive: 9 plays, 64 yards, 4:05.**
- CAR – Ryan Fitzgerald 55-yard field goal, 2:30. Panthers 10–7. **Drive: 9 plays, 36 yard, 4:03.**

**Fourth quarter**

- NO – Alvin Kamara 4-yard pass from Tyler Shough (Charlie Smyth kick), 3:49. Saints 14–10. **Drive: 9 plays, 70 yards, 5:41.**
- CAR – Chuba Hubbard 1-yard run (Ryan Fitzgerald kick), 1:49. Panthers 17–14. **Drive: 6 plays, 68 yards, 2:00.**
- NO – Charlie Smyth 55-yard field goal, 0:41. Tied 17–17. **Drive: 8 plays, 41 yards, 1:08.**
- CAR – Ryan Fitzgerald 54-yard field goal, 0:00. Panthers 20–17. **Drive: 3 plays, 30 yard, 0:41.**

**Top passers**

- CAR – Bryce Young – 17/30, 200 yards
- NO – Tyler Shough – 25/35, 187 yards, TD, INT

**Top rushers**

- CAR – Chuba Hubbard – 27 rushes, 92 yards, 2 TD
- NO – Tyler Shough – 6 rushes, 25 yards

**Top receivers**

- CAR – Chuba Hubbard – 5 receptions, 80 yards
- NO – Jordyn Tyson – 11 receptions, 80 yards

==== Week 11: at Chicago Bears ====
Week 11: New Orleans Saints at Chicago Bears – Game summary

Quarter	1	2	3	4	Total
Saints	0	10	0	3	**13**
**Bears**	3	13	3	2	**21**

at Soldier Field, Chicago, Illinois

- Date: November 22
- Game time: 12:00 p.m. CST
- Game weather: Cloudy, 56 °F (13 °C)
- Game attendance: 59,911
- Referee: Brad Rogers
- TV announcers (Fox): Kevin Burkhardt, Tom Brady, Erin Andrews and Tom Rinaldi
- Recap, Game Book

Game information

**First quarter**

- CHI – Cairo Santos 41-yard field goal, 10:43. Bears 3–0. **Drive: 10 plays, 46 yards, 4:17.**

**Second quarter**

- CHI – D'Andre Swift 3-yard pass from Caleb Williams (Cairo Santos kick), 11:34. Bears 10–0. **Drive: 6 plays, 41 yards, 2:47.**
- CHI – Coleston Loveland 15-yard pass from Caleb Williams (kick failed), 7:21. Bears 16–0. **Drive: 3 plays, 46 yards, 1:33.**
- NO – Alvin Kamara 1-yard pass from Tyler Shough (Charlie Smyth kick), 3:34. Bears 16–7. **Drive: 7 plays, 80 yards, 3:47.**
- NO – Charlie Smyth 56-yard field goal, 0:00. Bears 16–10. **Drive: 9 plays, 46 yards, 0:54.**

**Third quarter**

- CHI – Cairo Santos 35-yard field goal, 7:16. Bears 19–10. **Drive: 11 plays, 63 yards, 5:32.**

**Fourth quarter**

- CHI – Tyler Shough sacked by Montez Sweat for 7-yard loss for safety, 12:55. Bears 21–10. **Drive: 2 plays, -7 yards, 0:46.**
- NO – Charlie Smyth 51-yard field goal, 1:10. Bears 21–13. **Drive: 14 plays, 47 yards, 3:48.**

**Top passers**

- NO – Tyler Shough – 25/42, 222 yards, TD, INT
- CHI – Caleb Williams – 15/23, 181 yards, 2 TD, INT

**Top rushers**

- NO – Travis Etienne – 14 rushes, 76 yards
- CHI – D'Andre Swift – 13 rushes, 51 yards

**Top receivers**

- NO – Chris Olave – 9 receptions, 102 yards
- CHI – Zavion Thomas – 2 receptions, 56 yards

==== Week 12: at Cincinnati Bengals ====
Week 12: New Orleans Saints at Cincinnati Bengals – Game summary

Quarter	1	2	3	4	Total
Saints	0	0	0	0	**0**
Bengals	0	0	0	0	**0**

at Paycor Stadium, Cincinnati, Ohio

- Date: November 29
- Game time: 1:00 p.m. EST/12:00 p.m. CST
- TV announcers (CBS): Ian Eagle, Ross Tucker and Evan Washburn
- Preview

=== Standings ===
==== Division ====
NFC South
	W	L	T	PCT	DIV	CONF	PF	PA	STK
Carolina Panthers	5	5	0	.500	2–1	4–3	254	269	W2
Tampa Bay Buccaneers	3	7	0	.300	2–0	3–4	223	209	L2
Atlanta Falcons	3	7	0	.300	1–2	3–3	201	258	L3
New Orleans Saints	3	7	0	.300	0–2	1–5	215	257	L2

==== Conference ====
NFC
Seed	Team	Division	W	L	T	PCT	DIV	CONF	SOS	SOV	STK
**Division leaders**
1	San Francisco 49ers	West	8	1	0	.889	3–0	5–1	.428	.444	W2
2 (Note: Detroit wins tie break over Chicago based on division record.)	Detroit Lions	North	8	2	0	.800	2–0	5–1	.440	.375	W6
3	New York Giants	East	5	3	1	.611	2–1–1	3–3–1	.356	.308	L1
4	Carolina Panthers	South	5	5	0	.500	2–1	4–3	.510	.412	W2
**Wild cards**
5	Chicago Bears	North	8	2	0	.800	0–2	6–2	.434	.375	W5
6	Minnesota Vikings	North	7	2	0	.778	3–1	5–1	.516	.423	W1
7 (Note: Green Bay wins tie break over Seattle based on conference record. Division tie break was initially used to eliminate LA Rams (see below).)	Green Bay Packers	North	6	4	0	.600	1–3	4–4	.535	.459	L1
**In the hunt**
8 (Note: Seattle wins tie break over LA Rams based on division record.)	Seattle Seahawks	West	6	4	0	.600	2–1	2–3	.515	.393	W2
9	Los Angeles Rams	West	6	4	0	.600	1–2	4–2	.485	.345	W4
10	Dallas Cowboys	East	5	6	0	.455	2–1	2–5	.400	.290	W1
11	Washington Commanders	East	3	5	1	.389	2–2–1	3–4–1	.506	.500	W1
12 (Note: Tampa Bay wins tie break over Philadelphia based on conference record. Division tie break was initially used to eliminate Atlanta and New Orleans (see below).) (Note: Tampa Bay wins tie break over Atlanta and New Orleans based on head-to-head record.)	Tampa Bay Buccaneers	South	3	7	0	.300	2–0	3–4	.616	.419	L2
13 (Note: Atlanta wins tie break over Philadephia based on conference record. Division tie break was initially used to eliminate New Orleans (see below).) (Note: Atlanta wins tie break over New Orleans based on head-to-head victory.)	Atlanta Falcons	South	3	7	0	.300	1–2	3–3	.586	.586	L3
14 (Note: New Orleans wins tie break over Philadelphia based on conference record.)	New Orleans Saints	South	3	7	0	.300	0–2	1–5	.571	.517	L2
15	Philadelphia Eagles	East	3	7	0	.300	1–3	1–6	.521	.362	W1
16	Arizona Cardinals	West	3	8	0	.273	1–4	2–6	.621	.400	L3
