= 2025 New Orleans Saints season =

59th season in franchise history

- Owner: Gayle Benson
- General manager: Mickey Loomis
- Head coach: Kellen Moore
- Offensive coordinator: Doug Nussmeier
- Defensive coordinator: Brandon Staley
- Home stadium: Caesars Superdome

Results
- Record: 6–11
- Division place: 4th NFC South
- Playoffs: Did not qualify
- All-Pros: WR Chris Olave (2nd team)
- Pro Bowlers: None

Uniform
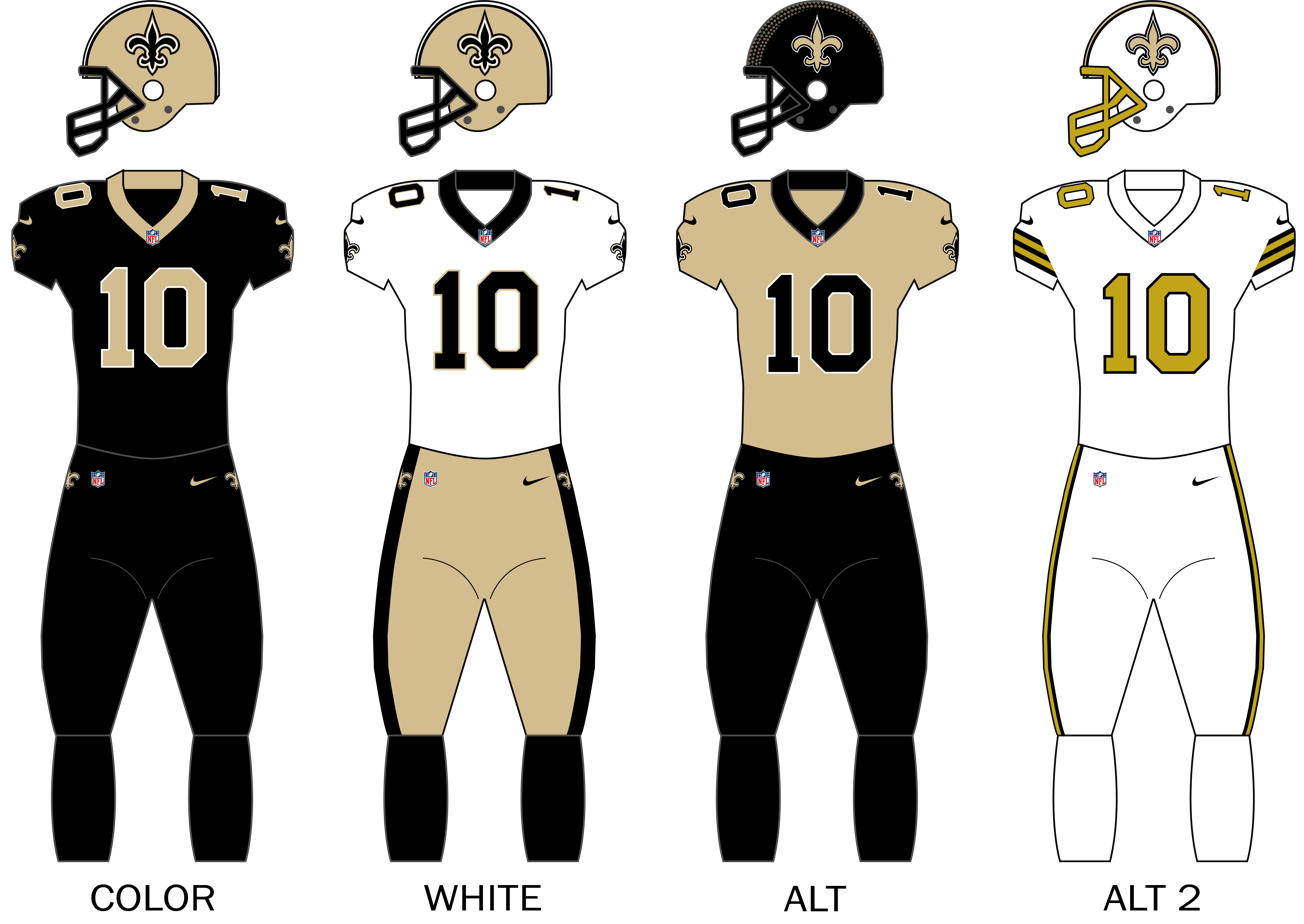

The 2025 season was the New Orleans Saints' 59th in the National Football League (NFL), their 50th to host games at the Caesars Superdome and their first under head coach Kellen Moore. They improved on last year’s 5–12 record after a Week 17 win against the Tennessee Titans.

After starting 2–10 for the first time since 1999, the Saints began to heat up, winning four of their last five games, but they were still eliminated from playoff contention for the 5th consecutive season after losing in week 13 to the Dolphins.

During a game in Week 8 against the division rival Tampa Bay Buccaneers, quarterback Spencer Rattler was benched in favor of rookie Tyler Shough due to his poor performance. Shough was named the starter the following week in Week 9 against the Los Angeles Rams and remained the starter for the remainder of the season.

The New Orleans Saints drew an average home attendance of 70,012, the 14th-highest of all NFL teams.

== Offseason ==
=== Coaching changes ===
2025 New Orleans Saints coaching staff changes
Position	Previous coach(es)	Vacancy reason	Replacement(s)	Source(s)
Head coach	Dennis Allen, 2022–2024	Fired	Kellen Moore	
Offensive coordinator	Klint Kubiak, 2024	Hired by Seattle	Doug Nussmeier	
Defensive coordinator	Joe Woods, 2023–2024	Hired by Las Vegas	Brandon Staley	
Special teams coordinator	Darren Rizzi, 2019–2024	Hired by Denver	Phil Galiano	
Run game coordinator	Vacant		T.J. Paganetti	
Quarterbacks coach	Andrew Janocko, 2024	Hired by Seattle	Scott Tolzien	
Running backs coach	Derrick Foster, 2024	Hired by Dallas	Joel Thomas	
Assistant wide receivers coach	DeNarius McGhee, 2024	Hired by Utah State	Kyle Valero	
Tight ends coach	Clancy Barone, 2023–2024	Fired	Chase Haslett	
Offensive line coach	John Benton, 2024	Hired by Seattle	Brendan Nugent	
Assistant offensive line coach	Vacant		Jahri Evans	
Senior offensive assistant	Rick Dennison, 2024	Hired by Seattle	Scott Linehan	
Offensive assistant	Jahri Evans, 2023–2024 Kevin Petry, 2017–2024 Jordan Traylor, 2023–2024	Promoted to assistant offensive line coach Did not return Hired by Minnesota	Tobijah Hughley	
Defensive pass game coordinator	Vacant		Terry Joseph	
Defensive line coach	Todd Grantham, 2023–2024	Hired by Oklahoma State	Bo Davis	
Assistant defensive line coach	Vacant		Brian Young	
Edges coach	Vacant		Jay Rodgers	
Linebackers coach	Michael Hodges, 2020–2024	Hired by Cincinnati	Peter Sirmon	
Assistant linebackers coach	Vacant		Adam Gristick	
Defensive backs coach	Marcus Robertson, 2023–2024	Hired by Las Vegas	Grady Brown	
Assistant defensive backs coach	Vacant		Robert Blanton	
Assistant special teams coordinator	Phil Galiano, 2019–2024	Promoted to special teams coordinator	Kyle Wilber	

=== Future contracts ===
Position	Player	Date signed
DT	Ryder Anderson	January 6
S	Milliard Bradford	January 6
QB	Ben DiNucci	January 6
OT	Josiah Ezirim	January 6
CB	Tra Fluellen	January 6
TE	Michael Jacobson	January 6
K	Charlie Smyth	January 6
RB	Xazavian Valladay	January 6
TE	Treyton Welch	January 6

=== Free agents ===
Below are players whose contracts with the team expired after the 2024 season.

Position	Player	Tag	2025 team	Notes
CB	Paulson Adebo	UFA	New York Giants	3 year, 54 million
S	Ugo Amadi	UFA	New Orleans Saints	1 year, 1 million
ILB	Willie Gay	UFA	Miami Dolphins	1 year, 1 million
S	Will Harris	UFA	Washington Commanders	2 year, 8 million
G	Kyle Hergel	ERFA	New Orleans Saints	1 year, 1 million
OT	Justin Herron	UFA	Detroit Lions	TBA
CB	Shemar Jean-Charles	UFA	Seattle Seahawks	1 year, 1 million
DE	Trajan Jeffcoat	SFA	TBD	
TE	Juwan Johnson	UFA	New Orleans Saints	3 years, 30 million
DE	Tanoh Kpassagnon	UFA	Chicago Bears	TBA
G	Shane Lemieux	UFA	New Orleans Saints	TBA
G	Lucas Patrick	UFA	Cincinnati Bengals	1 year, 2 million
WR	Dante Pettis	UFA	New Orleans Saints	1 year, 1 million
FB	Adam Prentice	UFA	Denver Broncos	TBA
ILB	Nephi Sewell	ERFA	New Orleans Saints	1 year, 1 million
S	Isaiah Stalbird	ERFA	New Orleans Saints	1 year, 1 million
DE	Payton Turner	UFA	Dallas Cowboys	1 year, 3 million
OT	Oli Udoh	UFA	Tennessee Titans	1 year, 1 million
WR	Marquez Valdes-Scantling	UFA	Seattle Seahawks	1 year, 4 million
DE	Chase Young	UFA	New Orleans Saints	3 years, 51 million
OT	Landon Young	UFA	New Orleans Saints	1 year, 2 million

=== Signings ===
Position	Player	Tag	2024 team	Date signed	Notes
S	Justin Reid	UFA	Kansas City Chiefs	March 12	3 years, 31.5 million
C	Will Clapp	UFA	Buffalo Bills	March 13	1 year, 1 million
TE	Jack Stoll	UFA	Miami Dolphins	March 13	1 year, 1 million
CB	Isaac Yiadom	UFA	San Francisco 49ers	March 13	3 years, 9 million
DE	Jonah Williams	UFA	Detroit Lions	March 14	1 year, 1 million
WR	Velus Jones Jr.	UFA	Carolina Panthers	March 17	1 year, 1 million
WR	Brandin Cooks	UFA	Dallas Cowboys	March 21	2 years, 13 million
G	Dillon Radunz	UFA	Tennessee Titans	March 24	1 year, 2 million
DE	Chris Rumph	UFA	Los Angeles Chargers	April 28	1 year, 1 million
S	Terrell Burgess	UFA	Buffalo Bills	May 12	1 year, 1 million
WR	Donovan Peoples-Jones	UFA	Detroit Lions	May 12	1 year, 1 million
RB	Cam Akers	UFA	Minnesota Vikings	June 13	1 year, 1 million
TE	Seth Green	UFA	Arlington Renegades (UFL)	June 18	1 year, 1 million
OT	Barry Wesley	UFA	Birmingham Stallions (UFL)	June 18	1 year, 1 million
CB	Jayden Price	UFA	Arlington Renegades (UFL)	June 20	1 year, 1 million
DE	Jonathan Bullard	UFA	Minnesota Vikings	June 20	1 year, 1 million
S	Julian Blackmon	UFA	Indianapolis Colts	July 22	1 year, 3 million
TE	Mason Pline	Waivers	San Francisco 49ers	August 5	TBA

=== Extensions ===
Below are players who are under contract through 2025 and received a contract extension.

Position	Player	Date signed	Notes
DT	Nathan Shepherd	March 10	1 year

=== Releases ===
Position	Player	2025 team	Release Date
RB	Jamaal Williams	TBD	March 5
DT	Camron Peterson	TBD	March 19
DE	Ryder Anderson	TBD	April 29
QB	Ben DiNucci	TBD	April 29
S	Milliard Bradford	Chicago Bears	May 12
RB	Jordan Mims	Tennessee Titans	May 12
LB	Anfernee Orji	Tennessee Titans	May 14
RB	Xazavian Valladay	TBD	June 20
CB	Tra Fluellen	TBD	June 20
OT	Josh Ball	TBD	July 28
QB	Hunter Dekkers	New Orleans Saints	July 31
TE	Seth Green	TBD	August 5
P	Matthew Hayball	TBD	August 6

=== Trades ===
Trades below only are for trades that included a player. Draft pick-only trades will go in draft section.

Date	Player(s)/Asset(s) received	Team	Player(s)/Asset(s) traded	Source
March 12	DT Davon Godchaux	New England Patriots	2026 7th round selection	
August 17	C Luke Fortner	Jacksonville Jaguars	DT Khalen Saunders	
August 20	WR Devaughn Vele	Denver Broncos	2026 4th round selection, 2027 7th round selection	

=== Retirements ===
Position	Player	Date Retired	Years with the Saints	Years in the NFL
OT	Ryan Ramczyk	April 17	8	8
QB	Derek Carr	May 10	2	11
TE	Jimmy Graham	July 22	6	13
TE	Dallin Holker	July 22	1	1
S	Tyrann Mathieu	July 22	3	12

== Draft ==
2025 New Orleans Saints draft selections
Round	Selection	Player	Position	College	Notes
1	9	Kelvin Banks Jr.	OT	Texas	
2	40	Tyler Shough	QB	Louisville	
3	71	Vernon Broughton	DT	Texas	
3	93	Jonas Sanker	S	Virginia	From Commanders (Note: The Saints traded a fifth-round selection (147th overall) and CB Marshon Lattimore to the Washington Commanders in exchange for third-, fourth- and sixth-round selections (93rd, 131st and 184th overall).)
4	112	Danny Stutsman	LB	Oklahoma	
4	131	Quincy Riley	CB	Louisville	From Commanders
5	147	Traded to the Washington Commanders			
6	184	Devin Neal	RB	Kansas	From Saints (Note: The Saints traded a sixth rounder (184th overall) to the Washington Commanders in exchange for a seventh round selection (248th overall) and DT John Ridgeway III.) via Commanders
7	223	Traded to the Philadelphia Eagles (Note: The Saints traded a seventh round pick (223rd overall) and S C. J. Gardner-Johnson to the Philadelphia Eagles in exchange for a 2023 fifth and 2024 sixth round pick.)			
7	248	Moliki Matavao	TE	UCLA	From Commanders
7	254	Fadil Diggs	DE	Syracuse	Compensatory selection

Draft trades

2025 New Orleans Saints undrafted free agents
Name	Position	College	Ref.
Dalys Beanum	DB	South Dakota State	
James Burnip	P	Alabama	
Jasheen Davis	DE	Wake Forest	
Elliott Davison	S	UTSA	
Moochie Dixon	WR	SMU	
Easton Kilty	OT	Kansas State	
Tyreem Powell	LB	Rutgers	
Torricelli Simpkins III	OL	South Carolina	
Omari Thomas	DT	Tennessee	
Chris Tyree	WR	Virginia	
Marcus Yarns	RB	Delaware	
Hunter Dekkers	QB	Iowa Western	
Jonathan Mendoza	OT	Louisville	
Kai Kroeger	P	South Carolina	

== Staff ==
2025 New Orleans Saints staff
Front office: Owner – Gayle Benson; President – Dennis Lauscha; Executive vice president/general manager – Mickey Loomis; Senior VP of football operations/assistant general manager – Khai Harley; Senior VP/assistant general manager – college personnel – Jeff Ireland; Vice president of pro personnel – Michael Parenton; Director of football administration – Scott Kuhn; Director of analytics – Zach Stuart; Director of team operations – Derek Stamnos; Head coaches: Head coach – Kellen Moore; Associate head coach/running backs – Joel Thomas; Assistant to the head coach – Mike Martinez; Offensive coaches: Offensive coordinator – Doug Nussmeier; Run game coordinator – T.J. Paganetti; Quarterbacks – Scott Tolzien; Wide receivers – Keith Williams; Assistant wide receivers – Kyle Valero; Tight ends – Chase Haslett; Offensive line – Brendan Nugent; Assistant offensive line – Jahri Evans; Senior offensive assistant – Scott Linehan; Offensive assistant – Tobijah Hughley	Defensive coaches: Defensive coordinator – Brandon Staley; Defensive pass game coordinator – Terry Joseph; Defensive line – Bo Davis; Assistant defensive line – Brian Young; Edges – Jay Rodgers; Linebackers – Peter Sirmon; Assistant linebackers – Adam Gristick; Cornerbacks – Grady Brown; Assistant defensive backs– Robert Blanton; Senior defensive assistant – Peter Giunta; Special teams coaches: Special teams coordinator – Phil Galiano; Assistant special teams – Kyle Wilber; Strength and conditioning: Director of sports science – Ted Rath; Strength and conditioning coach – Matt Clapp; Assistant strength and conditioning – Charles Byrd; Assistant strength and conditioning – Rob Wenning

== Final roster ==
2025 New Orleans Saints roster
Quarterbacks (QB): 7 Taysom Hill; 2 Spencer Rattler; 6 Tyler Shough; Running backs (RB): 85 Ronnie Bell; 30 Audric Estimé; 34 Evan Hull; 41 Alvin Kamara; Wide receivers (WR): 81 Kevin Austin Jr.; 12 Chris Olave; 11 Dante Pettis; 89 Samori Toure; Tight ends (TE): 83 Juwan Johnson; 80 Moliki Matavao; 82 Treyton Welch	Offensive linemen (OL): 71 Kelvin Banks Jr. LT; 79 Luke Fortner C; 75 Taliese Fuaga RT; 77 Dillon Radunz LG; 72 Asim Richards RT; 51 Cesar Ruiz RG; 66 Will Sherman G; 68 Torricelli Simpkins III LG; 74 Xavier Truss RT; Defensive linemen (DL): 97 Khristian Boyd DT; 90 Bryan Bresee DT; 98 Jonathan Bullard DE; 40 Fadil Diggs DE; 92 Davon Godchaux DT; 96 Carl Granderson DE; 94 Cameron Jordan DE; 95 John Ridgeway III DT; 58 Chris Rumph II DE; 93 Nathan Shepherd DT; 54 Jonah Williams DE; 99 Chase Young DE	Linebackers (LB): 56 Demario Davis ILB; 53 Jaylan Ford ILB; 44 Isaiah Stalbird OLB; 28 Danny Stutsman OLB; 20 Pete Werner ILB; Defensive backs (DB): 0 Ugo Amadi S; 26 Terrell Burgess S; 31 Jordan Howden S; 4 Kool-Aid McKinstry CB; 21 Justin Reid S; 29 Quincy Riley CB; 33 Jonas Sanker S; 1 Alontae Taylor CB; 25 Rejzohn Wright CB; 27 Isaac Yiadom CB; Special teams (ST): 32 Kai Kroeger P; 39 Charlie Smyth K; 49 Zach Wood LS	Practice squad: 37 Dalys Beanum CB; 22 Beanie Bishop CB; 86 Elijah Cooks WR; 35 Elliot Davison S; 18 Hunter Dekkers QB; 3 Jake Haener QB; 19 Nyheim Miller-Hines RB; 59 Coziah Izzard DT; 73 Easton Kilty RG; 38 Jayden Price CB; 45 Nephi Sewell MLB; 69 Barry Wesley LT; Reserve: 23 Julian Blackmon S (IR); 91 Vernon Broughton DT (IR); 76 Will Clapp C (IR); 43 Michael Davis CB (IR); 78 Erik McCoy C (IR); 16 Bub Means WR (IR); 5 Kendre Miller RB (IR); 84 Zaire Mitchell-Paden TE (IR); 87 Foster Moreau TE (IR); 24 Devin Neal RB (IR); 17 Trey Palmer WR (IR); 85 Mason Pline TE (IR); 89 Ja'Lynn Polk WR (IR); 64 Nick Saldiveri RG (IR); 88 Jack Stoll TE (IR); 15 Mason Tipton WR (IR); 14 Devaughn Vele WR (IR); 67 Landon Young LT (IR); Rookies in italics 53 active, 18 reserve, 12 practice squad

== Preseason ==
Week	Date	Opponent	Result	Record	Venue	Recap
1	August 10	at Los Angeles Chargers	L 13–27	0–1	SoFi Stadium	Recap
2	August 17	Jacksonville Jaguars	T 17–17	0–1–1	Caesars Superdome	Recap
3	August 23	Denver Broncos	L 19–28	0–2–1	Caesars Superdome	Recap

== Regular season ==
=== Schedule ===
Week	Date	Opponent	Result	Record	Venue	Recap
1	September 7	Arizona Cardinals	**L** 13–20	0–1	Caesars Superdome	Recap
2	September 14	San Francisco 49ers	**L** 21–26	0–2	Caesars Superdome	Recap
3	September 21	at Seattle Seahawks	**L** 13–44	0–3	Lumen Field	Recap
4	September 28	at Buffalo Bills	**L** 19–31	0–4	Highmark Stadium	Recap
5	October 5	New York Giants	**W** 26–14	1–4	Caesars Superdome	Recap
6	October 12	New England Patriots	**L** 19–25	1–5	Caesars Superdome	Recap
7	October 19	at Chicago Bears	**L** 14–26	1–6	Soldier Field	Recap
8	October 26	**Tampa Bay Buccaneers**	**L** 3–23	1–7	Caesars Superdome	Recap
9	November 2	at Los Angeles Rams	**L** 10–34	1–8	SoFi Stadium	Recap
10	November 9	at **Carolina Panthers**	**W** 17–7	2–8	Bank of America Stadium	Recap
11	Bye					
12	November 23	**Atlanta Falcons**	**L** 10–24	2–9	Caesars Superdome	Recap
13	November 30	at Miami Dolphins	**L** 17–21	2–10	Hard Rock Stadium	Recap
14	December 7	at **Tampa Bay Buccaneers**	**W** 24–20	3–10	Raymond James Stadium	Recap
15	December 14	**Carolina Panthers**	**W** 20–17	4–10	Caesars Superdome	Recap
16	December 21	New York Jets	**W** 29–6	5–10	Caesars Superdome	Recap
17	December 28	at Tennessee Titans	**W** 34–26	6–10	Nissan Stadium	Recap
18	January 4	at **Atlanta Falcons**	**L** 17–19	6–11	Mercedes-Benz Stadium	Recap

Note: Intra-division opponents are in bold text.

=== Game summaries ===
==== Week 1: vs. Arizona Cardinals ====
Week 1: Arizona Cardinals at New Orleans Saints – Game summary

Quarter	1	2	3	4	Total
**Cardinals**	3	14	3	0	**20**
Saints	0	10	0	3	**13**

at Caesars Superdome, New Orleans, Louisiana

- Date: September 7
- Game time: 12:00 p.m. CDT
- Game weather: None (indoor stadium)
- Game attendance: 70,006
- Referee: Scott Novak
- TV announcers (CBS): Tom McCarthy, Ross Tucker, Logan Ryan and Tiffany Blackmon
- Recap, Game Book

Game information

**First quarter**

- ARI – Chad Ryland 42-yard field goal, 5:03. Cardinals 3–0. **Drive: 11 plays, 42 yards, 5:31.**

**Second quarter**

- NO – Alvin Kamara 18-yard run (Blake Grupe kick), 14:20. Saints 7–3. **Drive: 10 plays, 75 yards, 5:43.**
- ARI – Marvin Harrison Jr. 1-yard pass from Kyler Murray (Chad Ryland kick), 10:05. Cardinals 10–7. **Drive: 7 plays, 65 yards, 4:15.**
- NO – Blake Grupe 36-yard field goal, 4:58. Tied 10–10. **Drive: 10 plays, 37 yards, 5:07.**
- ARI – James Conner 4-yard pass from Kyler Murray (Chad Ryland kick), 0:28. Cardinals 17–10. **Drive: 10 plays, 71 yards, 4:30.**

**Third quarter**

- ARI – Chad Ryland 50-yard field goal, 9:16. Cardinals 20–10. **Drive: 6 plays, 49 yards, 3:11.**

**Fourth quarter**

- NO – Blake Grupe 28-yard field goal, 2:42. Cardinals 20–13. **Drive: 9 plays, 54 yards, 1:52.**

**Top passers**

- ARI – Kyler Murray – 21/29, 163 yards, 2 TD
- NO – Spencer Rattler – 27/45, 214 yards

**Top rushers**

- ARI – Trey Benson – 8 rushes, 69 yards
- NO – Alvin Kamara – 11 rushes, 45 yards, TD

**Top receivers**

- ARI – Marvin Harrison Jr. – 5 receptions, 71 yards, TD
- NO – Juwan Johnson – 8 receptions, 76 yards

With the loss, the Saints started 0–1 for the first time since 2018 and fell to 0–5 when wearing their alternate black helmet. It was the Saints' first home loss to the Cardinals since the 1996 season.

==== Week 2: vs. San Francisco 49ers ====
Week 2: San Francisco 49ers at New Orleans Saints – Game summary

Quarter	1	2	3	4	Total
**49ers**	6	10	3	7	**26**
Saints	0	7	7	7	**21**

at Caesars Superdome, New Orleans, Louisiana

- Date: September 7
- Game time: 12:00 p.m. CDT
- Game weather: None (indoor stadium)
- Game attendance: 70,078
- Referee: Shawn Smith
- TV announcers (Fox): Kevin Kugler, Daryl Johnston and Allison Williams
- Recap, Game Book

Game information

**First quarter**

- SF – Luke Farrell 11-yard pass from Mac Jones (kick failed), 3:25. 49ers 6–0. **Drive: 14 plays, 80 yards, 7:56.**

**Second quarter**

- SF – Eddy Piñeiro 44-yard field goal, 3:43. 49ers 9–0. **Drive: 9 plays, 39 yards, 5:02.**
- NO – Juwan Johnson 18-yard pass from Spencer Rattler (Blake Grupe kick), 1:14. 49ers 9–7. **Drive: 12 plays, 84 yards, 5:34.**
- SF – Christian McCaffrey 7-yard pass from Mac Jones (Eddy Piñeiro kick), 0:07. 49ers 16–7. **Drive: 9 plays, 77 yards, 1:07.**

**Third quarter**

- NO – Rashid Shaheed 3-yard pass from Spencer Rattler (Blake Grupe kick), 7:11. 49ers 16–14. **Drive: 10 plays, 47 yards, 5:08.**
- SF – Eddy Piñeiro 46-yard field goal, 3:20. 49ers 19–14. **Drive: 8 plays, 49 yards, 3:51.**

**Fourth quarter**

- SF – Jauan Jennings 42-yard pass from Mac Jones (Eddy Piñeiro kick), 12:18. 49ers 26–14. **Drive: 7 plays, 68 yards, 4:20.**
- NO – Devaughn Vele 3-yard pass from Spencer Rattler (Blake Grupe kick), 6:18. 49ers 26–21. **Drive: 13 plays, 71 yards, 6:00.**

**Top passers**

- SF – Mac Jones – 26/39, 279 yards, 3 TD
- NO – Spencer Rattler – 25/34, 206 yards, 3 TD

**Top rushers**

- SF – Christian McCaffrey – 13 rushes, 55 yards
- NO – Alvin Kamara – 21 rushes, 100 yards

**Top receivers**

- SF – Jauan Jennings – 5 receptions, 89 yards, TD
- NO – Chris Olave – 6 receptions, 53 yards

With the loss, the Saints started 0–2 for the first time since 2017.

==== Week 3: at Seattle Seahawks ====
Week 3: New Orleans Saints at Seattle Seahawks – Game summary

Quarter	1	2	3	4	Total
Saints	0	6	0	7	**13**
**Seahawks**	21	17	6	0	**44**

at Lumen Field, Seattle, Washington

- Date: September 21
- Game time: 3:05 p.m. CDT/1:05 p.m. PDT
- Game weather: Cloudy, 63 °F (17 °C)
- Game attendance: 68,599
- Referee: Alex Moore
- TV announcers (CBS): Andrew Catalon, Charles Davis, Jason McCourty and AJ Ross
- Recap, Game Book

Game information

**First quarter**

- SEA – Jaxon Smith-Njigba 12-yard pass from Sam Darnold (Jason Myers kick), 9:48. Seahawks 7–0. **Drive: 6 plays, 55 yards, 2:32.**
- SEA – Tory Horton 95-yard punt return (Jason Myers kick), 7:31. Seahawks 14–0.
- SEA – Kenneth Walker III 3-yard run (Jason Myers kick), 4:22. Seahawks 21–0. **Drive: 2 plays, 11 yards, 0:28.**

**Second quarter**

- NO – Blake Grupe 27-yard field goal, 12:47. Seahawks 21–3. **Drive: 16 plays, 65 yards, 6:35.**
- SEA – Tory Horton 14-yard pass from Sam Darnold (Jason Myers kick), 11:18. Seahawks 28–3. **Drive: 3 plays, 38 yards, 1:29.**
- SEA – Kenneth Walker III 1-yard run (Jason Myers kick), 7:42. Seahawks 35–3. **Drive: 4 plays, 76 yards, 1:52.**
- SEA – Jason Myers 56-yard field goal, 1:29. Seahawks 38–3. **Drive: 6 plays, 20 yards, 1:20.**
- NO – Blake Grupe 23-yard field goal, 0:00. Seahawks 38–6. **Drive: 7 plays, 69 yards, 1:29.**

**Third quarter**

- SEA – Jason Myers 46-yard field goal, 11:29. Seahawks 41–6. **Drive: 7 plays, 37 yards, 3:31.**
- SEA – Jason Myers 37-yard field goal, 4:39. Seahawks 44–6. **Drive: 11 plays, 46 yards, 5:12.**

**Fourth quarter**

- NO – Jack Stoll 13-yard pass from Spencer Rattler (Blake Grupe kick), 14:53. Seahawks 44–13. **Drive: 11 plays, 80 yards, 4:46.**

**Top passers**

- NO – Spencer Rattler – 28/39, 218 yards, TD, INT
- SEA – Sam Darnold – 14/18, 218 yards, 2 TD

**Top rushers**

- NO – Alvin Kamara – 18 rushes, 42 yards
- SEA – Kenneth Walker III – 16 rushes, 38 yards, 2 TD

**Top receivers**

- NO – Chris Olave – 10 receptions, 57 yards
- SEA – Jaxon Smith-Njigba – 5 receptions, 96 yards, TD

With the blowout loss, the Saints were handed their first 0–3 start since 2016.

==== Week 4: at Buffalo Bills ====
Week 4: New Orleans Saints at Buffalo Bills – Game summary

Quarter	1	2	3	4	Total
Saints	7	3	6	3	**19**
**Bills**	14	0	7	10	**31**

at Highmark Stadium, Orchard Park, New York

- Date: September 28
- Game time: 1:00 p.m. EDT/12:00 p.m. CDT
- Game weather: Sunny, 73 °F (23 °C)
- Game attendance: 71,017
- Referee: Land Clark
- TV announcers (CBS): Andrew Catalon, Charles Davis, Jason McCourty and A.J Ross
- Recap, Game Book

Game information

**First quarter**

- BUF – Khalil Shakir 43-yard pass from Josh Allen (Matt Prater kick), 10:49. Bills 7–0. **Drive: 7 plays, 79 yards, 4:11.**
- NO – Kendre Miller 18-yard run (Blake Grupe kick), 6:46. Tied 7–7. **Drive: 7 plays, 69 yards, 4:03.**
- BUF – James Cook 1-yard run (Matt Prater kick), 2:29. Bills 14–7. **Drive: 7 plays, 66 yards, 4:17.**

**Second quarter**

- NO – Blake Grupe 54-yard field goal, 5:31. Bills 14–10. **Drive: 7 plays, 13 yards, 3:12.**

**Third quarter**

- BUF – Josh Allen 5-yard run (Matt Prater kick), 6:42. Bills 21–10. **Drive: 9 plays, 80 yards, 6:09.**
- NO – Chris Olave 3-yard pass from Spencer Rattler (run failed), 0:14. Bills 21–16. **Drive: 11 plays, 65 yards, 6:28.**

**Fourth quarter**

- NO – Blake Grupe 35-yard field goal, 8:53. Bills 21–19. **Drive: 9 plays, 32 yards, 3:59.**
- BUF – Dalton Kincaid 28-yard pass from Josh Allen (Matt Prater kick), 7:07. Bills 28–19. **Drive: 4 plays, 60 yards, 1:46.**
- BUF – Matt Prater 35-yard field goal, 2:09. Bills 31–19. **Drive: 9 plays, 42 yards, 3:27.**

**Top passers**

- NO – Spencer Rattler – 18/27, 126 yards, TD
- BUF – Josh Allen – 16/22, 209 yards, 2 TD, INT

**Top rushers**

- NO – Alvin Kamara – 15 rushes, 70 yards
- BUF – James Cook – 22 rushes, 117 yards, TD

**Top receivers**

- NO – Rashid Shaheed – 4 receptions, 47 yards
- BUF – Khalil Shakir – 5 receptions, 69 yards, TD

With the loss, the Saints started 0–4 for the first time since 2012. It was the Saints' first road loss to the Bills since the 1983 season.

==== Week 5: vs. New York Giants ====
Week 5: New York Giants at New Orleans Saints – Game summary

Quarter	1	2	3	4	Total
Giants	7	7	0	0	**14**
**Saints**	3	13	3	7	**26**

at Caesars Superdome, New Orleans, Louisiana

- Date: October 5
- Game time: 12:00 p.m. CDT
- Game weather: None (indoor stadium)
- Game attendance: 70,008
- Referee: Alan Eck
- TV announcers (CBS): Andrew Catalon, Charles Davis, Jason McCourty and A.J Ross
- Recap, Game Book

Game information

**First quarter**

- NYG – Theo Johnson 1-yard pass from Jaxson Dart (Jude McAtamney kick), 9:34. Giants 7–0. **Drive: 8 plays, 59 yards, 4:05.**
- NO – Blake Grupe 28-yard field goal, 1:40. Giants 7–3. **Drive: 14 plays, 70 yards, 7:54.**

**Second quarter**

- NYG – Theo Johnson 15-yard pass from Jaxson Dart (Jude McAtamney kick), 13:01. Giants 14–3. **Drive: 8 plays, 70 yards, 3:39.**
- NO – Blake Grupe 53-yard field goal, 7:41. Giants 14–6. **Drive: 12 plays, 49 yards, 5:20.**
- NO – Rashid Shaheed 87-yard pass from Spencer Rattler (Blake Grupe kick), 5:16. Giants 14–13. **Drive: 1 play, 87 yards, 0:11.**
- NO – Blake Grupe 29-yard field goal, 0:00. Saints 16–14. **Drive: 8 plays, 30 yards, 1:02.**

**Third quarter**

- NO – Blake Grupe 28-yard field goal, 6:55. Saints 19–14. **Drive: 10 plays, 45 yards, 3:57.**

**Fourth quarter**

- NO – Jordan Howden 86-yard fumble recovery (Blake Grupe kick), 14:47. Saints 26–14.

**Top passers**

- NYG – Jaxson Dart – 26/40, 202 yards, 2 TD, 2 INT
- NO – Spencer Rattler – 21/31, 225 yards, TD

**Top rushers**

- NYG – Cameron Skattebo – 15 rushes, 59 yards
- NO – Kendre Miller – 10 rushes, 41 yards

**Top receivers**

- NYG – Daniel Bellinger – 4 receptions, 52 yards
- NO – Rashid Shaheed – 4 receptions, 114 yards, TD

After being down 14–3, the Saints rallied to outscore the Giants 23–0 the rest of the game to secure their first win of 2025 and their third win in row against New York. This was also Spencer Rattler's first win of his career.

==== Week 6: vs. New England Patriots ====
Week 6: New England Patriots at New Orleans Saints – Game summary

Quarter	1	2	3	4	Total
**Patriots**	14	8	3	0	**25**
Saints	6	10	0	3	**19**

at Caesars Superdome, New Orleans, Louisiana

- Date: October 12
- Game time: 12:00 p.m. CDT
- Game weather: None (indoor stadium)
- Game attendance: 70,042
- Referee: Adrian Hill
- TV announcers (CBS): Spero Dedes, Adam Archuleta and Aditi Kinkhabwala
- Recap, Game Book

Game information

**First quarter**

- NO – Blake Grupe 34-yard field goal, 12:50. Saints 3–0. **Drive: 5 plays, 59 yards, 2:10.**
- NE – Demario Douglas 53-yard pass from Drake Maye (Andres Borregales kick), 10:52. Patriots 7–3. **Drive: 4 plays, 65 yards, 1:58.**
- NO – Blake Grupe 48-yard field goal, 5:05. Patriots 7–6. **Drive: 10 plays, 43 yards, 5:47.**
- NE – Kayshon Boutte 25-yard pass from Drake Maye (Andres Borregales kick), 0:33. Patriots 14–6. **Drive: 6 plays, 69 yards, 4:32.**

**Second quarter**

- NO – Taysom Hill 1-yard run (Blake Grupe kick), 9:42. Patriots 14–13. **Drive: 11 plays, 60 yards, 5:51.**
- NO – Blake Grupe 38-yard field goal, 1:51. Saints 16–14. **Drive: 8 plays, 27 yards, 3:59.**
- NE – Kayshon Boutte 29-yard pass from Drake Maye (Drake Maye run), 0:31. Patriots 22–16. **Drive: 7 plays, 73 yards, 1:20.**

**Third quarter**

- NE – Andres Borregales 24-yard field goal, 7:26. Patriots 25–16. **Drive: 12 plays, 50 yards, 7:34.**

**Fourth quarter**

- NO – Blake Grupe 54-yard field goal, 13:41. Patriots 25–19. **Drive: 7 plays, 25 yards, 3:56.**

**Top passers**

- NE – Drake Maye – 18/26, 261 yards, 3 TD
- NO – Spencer Rattler – 20/26, 227 yards

**Top rushers**

- NE – Drake Maye – 9 rushes, 28 yards
- NO – Alvin Kamara – 10 rushes, 31 yards

**Top receivers**

- NE – Kayshon Boutte – 5 receptions, 93 yards, 2 TD
- NO – Chris Olave – 6 receptions, 98 yards

With their first loss to New England since 2017, the Saints dropped to 1–5 for the first time since 1999.

==== Week 7: at Chicago Bears ====
Week 7: New Orleans Saints at Chicago Bears – Game summary

Quarter	1	2	3	4	Total
Saints	0	7	7	0	**14**
**Bears**	3	17	3	3	**26**

at Soldier Field, Chicago, Illinois

- Date: October 19
- Game time: 12:00 p.m. CDT
- Game weather: Cloudy, 49 °F (9 °C)
- Game attendance: 58,102
- Referee: Scott Novak
- TV announcers (Fox): Kevin Kugler, Daryl Johnston and Allison Williams
- Recap, Game Book

Game information

**First quarter**

- CHI – Jake Moody 27-yard field goal, 9:34. Bears 3–0. **Drive: 6 plays, 15 yards, 3:21.**

**Second quarter**

- CHI – Jake Moody 39-yard field goal, 14:06. Bears 6–0. **Drive: 9 plays, 35 yards, 3:49.**
- CHI – D'Andre Swift 11-yard run (Jake Moody kick), 9:05. Bears 13–0. **Drive: 4 plays, 30 yards, 2:01.**
- CHI – Kyle Monangai 1-yard run (Jake Moody kick), 2:51. Bears 20–0. **Drive: 8 plays, 55 yards, 4:35.**
- NO – Chris Olave 21-yard pass from Spencer Rattler (Blake Grupe kick), 0:22. Bears 20–7. **Drive: 5 plays, 91 yards, 0:46.**

**Third quarter**

- NO – Chris Olave 14-yard pass from Spencer Rattler (Blake Grupe kick), 9:40. Bears 20–14. **Drive: 10 plays, 80 yards, 5:20.**
- CHI – Jake Moody 24-yard field goal, 4:07. Bears 23–14. **Drive: 8 plays, 66 yards, 5:33.**

**Fourth quarter**

- CHI – Jake Moody 33-yard field goal, 6:22. Bears 26–14. **Drive: 8 plays, 51 yards, 4:18.**

**Top passers**

- NO – Spencer Rattler – 20/32, 233 yards, 2 TD, 3 INT
- CHI – Caleb Williams – 15/26, 172 yards, INT

**Top rushers**

- NO – Alvin Kamara – 11 rushes, 28 yards
- CHI – D'Andre Swift – 19 rushes, 124 yards, TD

**Top receivers**

- NO – Chris Olave – 5 receptions, 98 yards, 2 TD
- CHI – D. J. Moore – 3 receptions, 43 yards

The Saints faced their former head coach, Dennis Allen, who is now the defensive coordinator for the Bears. Allen's defense forced four turnovers and a fourth-down stop, as the Saints lost to the Bears, snapping their eight-game winning streak against them and marking their first loss to Chicago since the 2008 season. The Saints fell to 1–6 for the first time since 1999.

==== Week 8: vs. Tampa Bay Buccaneers ====
Week 8: Tampa Bay Buccaneers at New Orleans Saints – Game summary

Quarter	1	2	3	4	Total
**Buccaneers**	0	7	10	6	**23**
Saints	0	3	0	0	**3**

at Caesars Superdome, New Orleans, Louisiana

- Date: October 26
- Game time: 3:05 p.m. CDT
- Game weather: None (indoor stadium)
- Game attendance: 70,038
- Referee: Ron Torbert
- TV announcers (Fox): Kenny Albert, Jonathan Vilma and Megan Olivi
- Recap, Game Book

Game information

**First quarter**

- No scoring plays

**Second quarter**

- TB – Anthony Nelson 3-yard interception return (Chase McLaughlin kick), 6:41. Buccaneers 7–0.
- NO – Blake Grupe 48-yard field goal, 0:01. Buccaneers 7–3. **Drive: 6 plays, 15 yards, 0:46.**

**Third quarter**

- TB – Sean Tucker 1-yard run (Chase McLaughlin kick), 10:08. Buccaneers 14–3. **Drive: 10 plays, 73 yards, 4:52.**
- TB – Chase McLaughlin 55-yard field goal, 4:02. Buccaneers 17–3. **Drive: 7 plays, 18 yards, 4:17.**

**Fourth quarter**

- TB – Chase McLaughlin 52-yard field goal, 14:03. Buccaneers 20–3. **Drive: 7 plays, 16 yards, 2:25.**
- TB – Chase McLaughlin 54-yard field goal, 9:26. Buccaneers 23–3. **Drive: 4 plays, 8 yards, 2:18.**

**Top passers**

- TB – Baker Mayfield – 15/24, 152 yards
- NO – Spencer Rattler – 15/21, 136 yards, INT

**Top rushers**

- TB – Sean Tucker – 12 rushes, 42 yards, TD
- NO – Alvin Kamara – 6 rushes, 21 yards

**Top receivers**

- TB – Tez Johnson – 5 receptions, 43 yards
- NO – Rashid Shaheed – 9 receptions, 75 yards

Before the game, Buccaneers quarterback Baker Mayfield made comments suggesting that the Saints play dirty.

With their third straight loss to Tampa Bay, the Saints fell to 1–7 for the first time since 1999.

==== Week 9: at Los Angeles Rams ====
Week 9: New Orleans Saints at Los Angeles Rams – Game summary

Quarter	1	2	3	4	Total
Saints	0	10	0	0	**10**
**Rams**	7	13	7	7	**34**

at SoFi Stadium, Inglewood, California

- Date: November 2
- Game time: 3:05 p.m. CST/1:05 p.m. PST
- Game weather: Sunny, 65 °F (18 °C) (fixed roof)
- Game attendance: 72,055
- Referee: Shawn Smith
- TV announcers (Fox): Kenny Albert, Jonathan Vilma and Megan Olivi
- Recap, Game Book

Game information

**First quarter**

- LAR – Tyler Higbee 1-yard pass from Matthew Stafford (Joshua Karty kick), 6:18. Rams 7–0. **Drive: 12 plays, 88 yards, 6:43.**

**Second quarter**

- LAR – Davante Adams 3-yard pass from Matthew Stafford (kick failed), 11:28. Rams 13–0. **Drive: 11 plays, 62 yards, 5:53.**
- NO – Blake Grupe 39-yard field goal, 7:50. Rams 13–3. **Drive: 8 plays, 44 yards, 3:38.**
- LAR – Puka Nacua 39-yard pass from Matthew Stafford (Joshua Karty kick), 6:25. Rams 20–3. **Drive: 3 plays, 65 yards, 1:25.**
- NO – Juwan Johnson 11-yard pass from Tyler Shough (Blake Grupe kick), 0:07. Rams 20–10. **Drive: 6 plays, 71 yards, 0:47.**

**Third quarter**

- LAR – Davante Adams 4-yard pass from Matthew Stafford (Joshua Karty kick), 5:14. Rams 27–10. **Drive: 16 plays, 80 yards, 9:46.**

**Fourth quarter**

- LAR – Kyren Williams 1-yard run (Joshua Karty kick), 12:40. Rams 34–10. **Drive: 10 plays, 52 yards, 6:22.**

**Top passers**

- NO – Tyler Shough – 15/24, 176 yards, TD, INT
- LAR – Matthew Stafford – 24/32, 281 yards, 4 TD

**Top rushers**

- NO – Taysom Hill – 4 rushes, 30 yards
- LAR – Kyren Williams – 25 rushes, 114 yards, TD

**Top receivers**

- NO – Rashid Shaheed – 5 receptions, 68 yards
- LAR – Puka Nacua – 7 receptions, 95 yards, TD

Quarterback Tyler Shough, selected by the Saints in the second round of the 2025 NFL draft, made his first NFL start. With the loss, the Saints were swept by the NFC West and fell to 1–8, their worst start since starting 0–14 in 1980.

==== Week 10: at Carolina Panthers ====
Week 10: New Orleans Saints at Carolina Panthers – Game summary

Quarter	1	2	3	4	Total
**Saints**	3	7	0	7	**17**
Panthers	7	0	0	0	**7**

at Bank of America Stadium, Charlotte, North Carolina

- Date: November 9
- Game time: 1:00 p.m. EST/12:00 p.m. CST
- Game weather: Partly cloudy, 73 °F (23 °C)
- Game attendance: 72,804
- Referee: Brad Allen
- TV announcers (Fox): Chris Myers, Mark Schlereth and Jen Hale
- Recap, Game Book

Game information

**First quarter**

- CAR – Rico Dowdle 5-yard run (Ryan Fitzgerald kick), 7:59. Panthers 7–0. **Drive: 12 plays, 67 yards, 7:01.**
- NO – Blake Grupe 21-yard field goal, 2:52. Panthers 7–3. **Drive: 10 plays, 78 yards, 5:07.**

**Second quarter**

- NO – Chris Olave 62-yard pass from Tyler Shough (Blake Grupe kick), 9:21. Saints 10–7. **Drive: 7 plays, 75 yards, 3:57.**

**Third quarter**

- No scoring plays

**Fourth quarter**

- NO – Juwan Johnson 30-yard pass from Tyler Shough (Blake Grupe kick), 10:20. Saints 17–7. **Drive: 5 plays, 43 yards, 2:34.**

**Top passers**

- NO – Tyler Shough – 19/27, 282 yards, 2 TD
- CAR – Bryce Young – 17/25, 124 yards, INT

**Top rushers**

- NO – Alvin Kamara – 22 rushes, 83 yards
- CAR – Rico Dowdle – 18 rushes, 53 yards, TD

**Top receivers**

- NO – Chris Olave – 5 receptions, 104 yards, TD
- CAR – Tetairoa McMillan – 5 receptions, 60 yards

Tyler Shough threw for 282 yards and two touchdowns as he led the Saints to their second win of the season.

==== Week 12: vs. Atlanta Falcons ====
Week 12: Atlanta Falcons at New Orleans Saints – Game summary

Quarter	1	2	3	4	Total
**Falcons**	3	13	0	8	**24**
Saints	0	7	0	3	**10**

at Caesars Superdome, New Orleans, Louisiana

- Date: November 23
- Game time: 3:25 p.m. CST
- Game weather: None (indoor stadium)
- Game attendance: 70,005
- Referee: Brad Rogers
- TV announcers (Fox): Adam Amin, Drew Brees and Kristina Pink
- Recap, Game Book

Game information

**First quarter**

- ATL – Zane Gonzalez 56-yard field goal, 10:42. Falcons 3–0. **Drive: 4 plays, 1 yard, 2:14.**

**Second quarter**

- ATL – Davis Sills 9-yard pass from Kirk Cousins (Zane Gonzalez kick), 11:31. Falcons 10–0. **Drive: 8 plays, 77 yards, 3:46.**
- NO – Justin Reid 49-yard interception return (Blake Grupe kick), 6:41. Falcons 10–7.
- ATL – Zane Gonzalez 41-yard field goal, 1:56. Falcons 13–7. **Drive: 9 plays, 41 yards, 4:45.**
- ATL – Zane Gonzalez 54-yard field goal, 0:00. Falcons 16–7. **Drive: 10 plays, 26 yards, 0:52.**

**Third quarter**

- No scoring plays

**Fourth quarter**

- NO – Blake Grupe 33-yard field goal, 12:13. Falcons 16–10. **Drive: 15 plays, 44 yards, 8:24.**
- ATL – Darnell Mooney 49-yard pass from Kirk Cousins (Bijan Robinson run), 11:04. Falcons 24–10. **Drive: 3 plays, 68 yards, 1:09.**

**Top passers**

- ATL – Kirk Cousins – 16/23, 199 yards, 2 TD, INT
- NO – Tyler Shough – 30/43, 243 yards, INT

**Top rushers**

- ATL – Bijan Robinson – 14 rushes, 70 yards
- NO – Tyler Shough – 7 rushes, 22 yards

**Top receivers**

- ATL – Darnell Mooney – 3 receptions, 74 yards, TD
- NO – Chris Olave – 9 receptions, 70 yards

With the loss, the Saints fell to 2–9, remained winless when wearing their alternate black helmet (now 0–6), and lost to the Falcons at home for the first time since 2021.

==== Week 13: at Miami Dolphins ====
Week 13: New Orleans Saints at Miami Dolphins – Game summary

Quarter	1	2	3	4	Total
Saints	0	0	8	9	**17**
**Dolphins**	7	9	0	5	**21**

at Hard Rock Stadium, Miami Gardens, Florida

- Date: November 30
- Game time: 1:00 p.m. EST/12:00 p.m. CST
- Game weather: Cloudy, 76 °F (24 °C)
- Game attendance: 63,864
- Referee: Alan Eck
- TV announcers (Fox): Chris Myers, Mark Schlereth and Jen Hale
- Recap, Game Book

Game information

**First quarter**

- MIA – De'Von Achane 29-yard run (Riley Patterson kick), 11:19. Dolphins 7–0. **Drive: 6 plays, 69 yards, 3:41.**

**Second quarter**

- MIA – Riley Patterson 39-yard field goal, 14:09. Dolphins 10–0. **Drive: 8 plays, 68 yards, 2:52.**
- MIA – Riley Patterson 25-yard field goal, 6:07. Dolphins 13–0. **Drive: 10 plays, 44 yards, 5:28.**
- MIA – Riley Patterson 48-yard field goal, 0:00. Dolphins 16–0. **Drive: 5 plays, 13 yards, 1:08.**

**Third quarter**

- NO – Chris Olave 17-yard pass from Tyler Shough (Tyler Shough run), 10:40. Dolphins 16–8. **Drive: 10 plays, 65 yards, 4:20.**

**Fourth quarter**

- MIA – Riley Patterson 33-yard field goal, 9:39. Dolphins 19–8. **Drive: 9 plays, 38 yards, 3:45.**
- NO – Charlie Smyth 56-yard field goal, 6:08. Dolphins 19–11. **Drive: 10 plays, 37 yards, 3:31.**
- NO – Devaughn Vele 15-yard pass from Tyler Shough (pass failed), 1:17. Dolphins 19–17. **Drive: 7 plays, 55 yards, 1:46.**
- MIA – Minkah Fitzpatrick interception return, 1:17. Dolphins 21–17.

**Top passers**

- NO – Tyler Shough – 26/38, 239 yards, 2 TD, INT
- MIA – Tua Tagovailoa – 12/23, 157 yards, INT

**Top rushers**

- NO – Devin Neal – 14 rushes, 47 yards
- MIA – De'Von Achane – 22 rushes, 134 yards, TD

**Top receivers**

- NO – Devaughn Vele – 8 receptions, 93 yards, TD
- MIA – Darren Waller – 2 receptions, 47 yards

With their first loss in Miami since 1998, the Saints fell to 2–10 for the first time since 1999 and they were eliminated from playoff contention for the fifth straight year. They also dropped to 0–3 against the AFC East.

==== Week 14: at Tampa Bay Buccaneers ====
Week 14: New Orleans Saints at Tampa Bay Buccaneers – Game summary

Quarter	1	2	3	4	Total
**Saints**	7	0	10	7	**24**
Buccaneers	7	3	7	3	**20**

at Raymond James Stadium, Tampa, Florida

- Date: December 7
- Game time: 1:00 p.m. EST/12:00 p.m. CST
- Game weather: Cloudy, 73 °F (23 °C)
- Game attendance: 63,125
- Referee: Clete Blakeman
- TV announcers (CBS): Kevin Harlan, Trent Green and Melanie Collins
- Recap, Game Book

Game information

**First quarter**

- NO – Devin Neal 3-yard run (Charlie Smyth kick), 12:24. Saints 7–0. **Drive: 6 plays, 45 yards, 2:36.**
- TB – Bucky Irving 24-yard pass from Baker Mayfield (Chase McLaughlin kick), 7:57. Tied 7–7. **Drive: 7 plays, 67 yards, 4:27.**

**Second quarter**

- TB – Chase McLaughlin 41-yard field goal, 9:11. Buccaneers 10–7. **Drive: 5 plays, 17 yards, 1:57.**

**Third quarter**

- NO – Tyler Shough 34-yard run (Charlie Smyth kick), 11:27. Saints 14–10. **Drive: 3 plays, 47 yards, 1:19.**
- TB – Sean Tucker 1-yard run (Chase McLaughlin kick), 7:37. Buccaneers 17–14. **Drive: 7 plays, 65 yards, 3:50.**
- NO – Charlie Smyth 30-yard field goal, 1:32. Tied 17–17. **Drive: 11 plays, 53 yards, 6:05.**

**Fourth quarter**

- NO – Tyler Shough 13-yard run (Charlie Smyth kick), 8:26. Saints 24–17. **Drive: 9 plays, 53 yards, 4:22.**
- TB – Chase McLaughlin 37-yard field goal, 4:54. Saints 24–20. **Drive: 9 plays, 41 yards, 3:32.**

**Top passers**

- NO – Tyler Shough – 13/20, 144 yards, INT
- TB – Baker Mayfield – 14/30, 122 yards, TD, INT

**Top rushers**

- NO – Devin Neal – 19 rushes, 70 yards, TD
- TB – Bucky Irving – 15 rushes, 55 yards

**Top receivers**

- NO – Devaughn Vele – 3 receptions, 40 yards
- TB – Chris Godwin – 5 receptions, 55 yards

With the win, the Saints snapped their 3-game losing streak against the Buccaneers and improved to 3–10 and 2–2 against the NFC South.

==== Week 15: vs. Carolina Panthers ====
Week 15: Carolina Panthers at New Orleans Saints – Game summary

Quarter	1	2	3	4	Total
Panthers	7	3	7	0	**17**
**Saints**	0	7	3	10	**20**

at Caesars Superdome, New Orleans, Louisiana

- Date: December 14
- Game time: 3:25 p.m. CST
- Game weather: None (indoor stadium)
- Game attendance: 70,070
- Referee: Alex Moore
- TV announcers (Fox): Jason Benetti, Robert Griffin III and Sarah Kustok
- Recap, Game Book

Game information

**First quarter**

- CAR – Rico Dowdle 4-yard run (Ryan Fitzgerald kick), 6:39. Panthers 7–0. **Drive: 13 plays, 74 yards, 7:18.**

**Second quarter**

- NO – Devin Neal 4-yard run (Charlie Smyth kick), 3:32. Tied 7–7. **Drive: 17 plays, 95 yards, 11:22.**
- CAR – Ryan Fitzgerald 40-yard field goal, 0:21. Panthers 10–7. **Drive: 9 plays, 51 yards, 3:11.**

**Third quarter**

- CAR – Jalen Coker 32-yard pass from Bryce Young (Ryan Fitzgerald kick), 9:54. Panthers 17–7. **Drive: 8 plays, 70 yards, 5:06.**
- NO – Charlie Smyth 42-yard field goal, 1:56. Panthers 17–10. **Drive: 14 plays, 48 yards, 7:58.**

**Fourth quarter**

- NO – Chris Olave 12-yard pass from Tyler Shough (Charlie Smyth kick), 2:29. Tied 17–17. **Drive: 7 plays, 78 yards, 2:08.**
- NO – Charlie Smyth 47-yard field goal, 0:02. Saints 20–17. **Drive: 8 plays, 62 yards, 0:55.**

**Top passers**

- CAR – Bryce Young – 15/24, 163 yards, TD
- NO – Tyler Shough – 24/32, 272 yards, TD

**Top rushers**

- CAR – Rico Dowdle – 16 rushes, 49 yards, TD
- NO – Tyler Shough – 8 rushes, 32 yards

**Top receivers**

- CAR – Jalen Coker – 4 receptions, 60 yards, TD
- NO – Chris Olave – 6 receptions, 85 yards, TD

With the win, the Saints swept the Panthers for the first time since 2023 and improved to 4–10 (3–2 against the NFC South).

==== Week 16: vs. New York Jets ====
Week 16: New York Jets at New Orleans Saints – Game summary

Quarter	1	2	3	4	Total
Jets	3	3	0	0	**6**
**Saints**	3	6	7	13	**29**

at Caesars Superdome, New Orleans, Louisiana

- Date: December 21
- Game time: 12:00 p.m. CST
- Game weather: None (indoor stadium)
- Game attendance: 70,043
- Referee: Clay Martin
- TV announcers (CBS): Tom McCarthy, Ross Tucker and Tiffany Blackmon
- Recap, Game Book

Game information

**First quarter**

- NYJ – Nick Folk 29-yard field goal, 10:38. Jets 3–0. **Drive: 8 plays, 26 yards, 4:01.**
- NO – Charlie Smyth 35-yard field goal, 6:31. Tied 3–3. **Drive: 12 plays, 43 yards, 4:07.**

**Second quarter**

- NO – Charlie Smyth 49-yard field goal, 14:18. Saints 6–3. **Drive: 8 plays, 35 yards, 3:59.**
- NYJ – Nick Folk 36-yard field goal, 12:38. Tied 6–6. **Drive: 6 plays, 47 yards, 1:40.**
- NO – Charlie Smyth 36-yard field goal, 1:31. Saints 9–6. **Drive: 15 plays, 73 yards, 5:46.**

**Third quarter**

- NO – Chris Olave 23-yard pass from Tyler Shough (Charlie Smyth kick), 0:41. Saints 16–6. **Drive: 12 plays, 93 yards, 5:20.**

**Fourth quarter**

- NO – Charlie Smyth 50-yard field goal, 11:09. Saints 19–6. **Drive: 5 plays, 14 yards, 1:36.**
- NO – Charlie Smyth 39-yard field goal, 5:17. Saints 22–6. **Drive: 10 plays, 23 yards, 3:51.**
- NO – Chris Olave 38-yard pass from Taysom Hill (Charlie Smyth kick), 1:54. Saints 29–6. **Drive: 3 plays, 44 yards, 0:56.**

**Top passers**

- NYJ – Brady Cook – 22/35, 188 yards, INT
- NO – Tyler Shough – 32/49, 308 yards, TD

**Top rushers**

- NYJ – Breece Hall – 16 rushes, 54 yards
- NO – Taysom Hill – 12 rushes, 42 yards

**Top receivers**

- NYJ – Isaiah Davis – 4 receptions, 52 yards
- NO – Chris Olave – 10 receptions, 148 yards, 2 TD

With the win, the Saints improved to 5–10 and finished 1–3 against the AFC East. The Saints also won their first game when wearing their alternate black helmet while also finishing 3–5 at home.

Taysom Hill’s receiving total brought him to 1,002 career yards, making him the first player in the Super Bowl era to have more than 1,000 career yards passing, rushing, and receiving.

==== Week 17: at Tennessee Titans ====
Week 17: New Orleans Saints at Tennessee Titans – Game summary

Quarter	1	2	3	4	Total
**Saints**	0	10	10	14	**34**
Titans	6	14	3	3	**26**

at Nissan Stadium, Nashville, Tennessee

- Date: December 28
- Game time: 12:00 p.m. CST
- Game weather: Cloudy, 71 °F (22 °C)
- Game attendance: 56,269
- Referee: Adrian Hill
- TV announcers (CBS): Andrew Catalon, Charles Davis, Jason McCourty and AJ Ross
- Recap, Game Book

Game information

**First quarter**

- TEN – Joey Slye 50-yard field goal, 9:10. Titans 3–0. **Drive: 4 plays, 3 yards, 1:34.**
- TEN – Joey Slye 38-yard field goal, 4:31. Titans 6–0. **Drive: 7 plays, 47 yards, 3:05.**

**Second quarter**

- TEN – Chig Okonkwo 43-yard pass from Cam Ward (Joey Slye kick), 12:57. Titans 13–0. **Drive: 7 plays, 64 yards, 4:09.**
- NO – Charlie Smyth 56-yard field goal, 5:53. Titans 13–3. **Drive: 12 plays, 44 yards, 7:04.**
- NO – Chase Young 33-yard fumble recovery (Charlie Smyth kick), 3:51. Titans 13–10.
- TEN – Elic Ayomanor 7-yard pass from Cam Ward (Joey Slye kick), 0:13. Titans 20–10. **Drive: 9 plays, 80 yards, 3:38.**

**Third quarter**

- NO – Chris Olave 19-yard pass from Tyler Shough (Charlie Smyth kick), 10:34. Titans 20–17. **Drive: 9 plays, 74 yards, 4:26.**
- TEN – Joey Slye 28-yard field goal, 7:28. Titans 23–17. **Drive: 6 plays, 55 yards, 3:14.**
- NO – Charlie Smyth 57-yard field goal, 1:51. Titans 23–20. **Drive: 8 plays, 27 yards, 5:29.**

**Fourth quarter**

- TEN – Joey Slye 58-yard field goal, 12:50. Titans 26–20. **Drive: 10 plays, 25 yards, 4:01.**
- NO – Kevin Austin Jr. 10-yard pass from Tyler Shough (Charlie Smyth kick), 6:22. Saints 27–26. **Drive: 10 plays, 25 yards, 4:01.**
- NO – Audric Estimé 32-yard run (Charlie Smyth kick), 3:44. Saints 34–26. **Drive: 4 plays, 64 yards, 1:10.**

**Top passers**

- NO – Tyler Shough – 22/27, 333 yards, 2 TD
- TEN – Cam Ward – 21/40, 251 yards, 2 TD

**Top rushers**

- NO – Audric Estimé – 14 rushes, 94 yards, TD
- TEN – Tony Pollard – 18 rushes, 85 yards

**Top receivers**

- NO – Chris Olave – 8 receptions, 119 yards, TD
- TEN – Chig Okonkwo – 3 receptions, 55 yards, TD

With their 4th straight win, their longest win streak since 2020, the Saints improved their win total from 2024 at 6–10. They also finished 2–3 against the AFC.

==== Week 18: at Atlanta Falcons ====
Week 18: New Orleans Saints at Atlanta Falcons – Game summary

Quarter	1	2	3	4	Total
Saints	0	7	3	7	**17**
**Falcons**	7	3	3	6	**19**

at Mercedes-Benz Stadium, Atlanta, Georgia

- Date: January 4
- Game time: 1:00 p.m. EST/12:00 p.m. CST
- Game weather: None (retractable roof closed)
- Game attendance: 69,512
- Referee: Ron Torbert
- TV announcers (Fox): Chris Myers, Mark Schlereth and Jen Hale
- Recap, Game Book

Game information

**First quarter**

- ATL – Drake London 15-yard pass from Kirk Cousins (Zane Gonzalez kick), 3:02. Falcons 7–0. **Drive: 2 plays, 5 yards, 0:16.**

**Second quarter**

- ATL – Zane Gonzalez 40-yard field goal, 10:19. Falcons 10–0. **Drive: 8 plays, 31 yards, 3:54.**
- NO – Tyler Shough 1-yard run (Charlie Smyth kick), 4:31. Falcons 10–7. **Drive: 10 plays, 65 yards, 5:48.**

**Third quarter**

- ATL – Zane Gonzalez 51-yard field goal, 8:50. Falcons 13–7. **Drive: 6 plays, 41 yards, 2:13.**
- NO – Charlie Smyth 29-yard field goal, 2:15. Falcons 13–10. **Drive: 14 plays, 56 yards, 6:35.**

**Fourth quarter**

- ATL – Zane Gonzalez 38-yard field goal, 10:43. Falcons 16–10. **Drive: 13 plays, 45 yards, 6:32.**
- ATL – Zane Gonzalez 38-yard field goal, 2:52. Falcons 19–10. **Drive: 4 plays, 7 yards, 0:22.**
- NO – Ronnie Bell 16-yard pass from Tyler Shough (Charlie Smyth kick), 1:11. Falcons 19–17. **Drive: 7 plays, 65 yards, 1:41.**

**Top passers**

- NO – Tyler Shough – 23/35, 259 yards, TD, INT
- ATL – Kirk Cousins – 18/32, 180 yards, TD, INT

**Top rushers**

- NO – Audric Estimé – 21 rushes, 63 yards
- ATL – Bijan Robinson – 15 rushes, 33 yards

**Top receivers**

- NO – Juwan Johnson – 3 receptions, 61 yards
- ATL – Drake London – 4 receptions, 78 yards, TD

The game-deciding play occurred with 3:24 remaining, when, from the Falcons’ 20-yard line, Shough was intercepted by Falcons cornerback Dee Alford, who returned the ball 59 yards to set up a field goal for Atlanta.

Ironically, this game determined whether the Panthers or Buccaneers would win the NFC South. The Saints’ loss resulted in the Buccaneers, Falcons, and Panthers finishing with identical 8–9 records. Carolina secured the division based on a superior head-to-head record against the other two teams (Panthers 3–1), compared to the Buccaneers (2–2) and Falcons (1–3).

With the loss, the Saints were swept by the Falcons for the first time since 2016. They also finished dead last in the NFC South at 6–11, 3–3 against the NFC South, and 3–6 on the road.

=== Standings ===
==== Division ====
NFC South
	W	L	T	PCT	DIV	CONF	PF	PA	STK
^{(4)} Carolina Panthers	8	9	0	.471	3–3	6–6	311	380	L2
Tampa Bay Buccaneers	8	9	0	.471	3–3	6–6	380	411	W1
Atlanta Falcons	8	9	0	.471	3–3	7–5	353	401	W4
New Orleans Saints	6	11	0	.353	3–3	4–8	306	383	L1

==== Conference ====
NFC
Seed	Team	Division	W	L	T	PCT	DIV	CONF	SOS	SOV	STK
**Division leaders**
1	Seattle Seahawks	West	14	3	0	.824	4–2	9–3	.498	.471	W7
2 (Note: Chicago finished ahead of Philadelphia based on head-to-head victory.)	Chicago Bears	North	11	6	0	.647	2–4	7–5	.458	.406	L2
3	Philadelphia Eagles	East	11	6	0	.647	3–3	8–4	.476	.455	L1
4 (Note: Carolina finished ahead of Tampa Bay and Atlanta based on head-to-head record (Carolina 3–1 to Tampa Bay 2–2 and Atlanta 1–3).)	Carolina Panthers	South	8	9	0	.471	3–3	6–6	.522	.463	L2
**Wild cards**
5 (Note: LA Rams finished ahead of San Francisco based on common games (LA Rams 9–3 to San Francisco 8–4 against: Arizona, Atlanta, Carolina, Houston, Indianapolis, Jacksonville, New Orleans, Seattle, Tampa Bay and Tennessee).)	Los Angeles Rams	West	12	5	0	.706	4–2	7–5	.526	.485	W1
6	San Francisco 49ers	West	12	5	0	.706	4–2	9–3	.498	.417	L1
7	Green Bay Packers	North	9	7	1	.559	4–2	7–4–1	.483	.431	L4
**Did not qualify for the postseason**
8 (Note: Minnesota finished ahead of Detroit based on head-to-head sweep.)	Minnesota Vikings	North	9	8	0	.529	4–2	7–5	.514	.431	W5
9	Detroit Lions	North	9	8	0	.529	2–4	6–6	.490	.428	W1
10 (Note: Tampa Bay finished ahead of Atlanta based on common games (Tampa Bay 6–6 to Atlanta 5–7 against: Arizona, Buffalo, Carolina, LA Rams, Miami, New England, New Orleans, NY Jets, San Francisco and Seattle).)	Tampa Bay Buccaneers	South	8	9	0	.471	3–3	6–6	.529	.485	W1
11	Atlanta Falcons	South	8	9	0	.471	3–3	7–5	.495	.449	W4
12	Dallas Cowboys	East	7	9	1	.441	4–2	4–7–1	.438	.311	L1
13	New Orleans Saints	South	6	11	0	.353	3–3	4–8	.495	.333	L1
14	Washington Commanders	East	5	12	0	.294	3–3	3–9	.507	.388	W1
15	New York Giants	East	4	13	0	.235	2–4	2–10	.524	.478	W2
16	Arizona Cardinals	West	3	14	0	.176	0–6	3–9	.571	.422	L9
**Tiebreakers** (Note: When breaking ties for three or more teams under the NFL's rules, they are first broken within divisions, then comparing only the highest ranked remaining team from each division.)
