= Devaughn Vele =

American football player (born 1997)

No. 14 – New Orleans Saints
- Position: Wide receiver
- Roster status: Active

Personal information
- Born: December 12, 1997 (age 28); Indianapolis, Indiana, U.S.
- Listed height: 6 ft 5 in (1.96 m)
- Listed weight: 210 lb (95 kg)

Career information
- High school: Rancho Bernardo (San Diego, California)
- College: Utah (2019–2023)
- NFL draft: 2024: 7th round, 235th overall pick

Career history
- Denver Broncos (2024); New Orleans Saints (2025–present)

Career NFL statistics as of Week 5, 2026
- Receptions: 91
- Receiving yards: 1,020
- Receiving touchdowns: 7
- Stats at Pro Football Reference

Devaughn Vele (/ˈveɪleɪ/ VAY-lay; born December 12, 1997) is an American professional football wide receiver for the New Orleans Saints of the National Football League (NFL). He played college football for the Utah Utes and was selected by the Denver Broncos in the seventh round of the 2024 NFL draft.

== Early life ==
Vele attended Rancho Bernardo High School and led the team to their first State Championship title in 2015. Coming out of high school, Vele served a two-year LDS mission. Upon returning, Vele decided to walk-on to play college football for the Utah Utes.

== College career ==
During the 2019 season, Vele used the season to redshirt. During the 2020 season, he played in five games making two catches for 12 yards. Heading into the 2021 season, Vele earned a scholarship from Utah. In week six of the 2021 season, he pulled down a 37-yard touchdown reception, helping the Utes take down USC. In the 2021 season, Vele had a breakout year bringing in 23 receptions for 389 yards and a touchdown. In the 2022 season, he tallied 50 receptions for 595 yards and five touchdowns. After the conclusion of the 2022 season, Vele originally planned to head to the NFL, however he decided to return to Utah for the 2023 season. In week ten of the 2023 season, Vele notched seven receptions for 80 yards in a loss to the Oregon Ducks. In week eleven, in a blowout win over Arizona State, Vele hauled in seven receptions for 56 yards and two touchdowns. In the 2023 season, Vele notched a total of 43 receptions for 593 yards and three touchdowns. After the conclusion of the 2023 season, Vele decided to declare for the 2024 NFL draft.

== Professional career ==
Pre-draft measurables
Height	Weight	Arm length	Hand span	Wingspan	40-yard dash	10-yard split	20-yard split	20-yard shuttle	Three-cone drill	Vertical jump	Broad jump	Bench press
6 ft 4 in (1.93 m)	203 lb (92 kg)	33 1/2 in (0.85 m)	9 3/4 in (0.25 m)	6 ft 7 1/8 in (2.01 m)	4.47 s	1.53 s	2.60 s	4.33 s	7.02 s	36.0 in (0.91 m)	10 ft 6 in (3.20 m)	11 reps
All values from NFL Combine/Pro Day

=== Denver Broncos ===
Vele was drafted in the seventh round with the 235th overall pick by the Denver Broncos in the 2024 NFL draft. In his NFL debut, he had eight receptions for 39 yards in a 26–20 loss to the Seattle Seahawks in Week 1.

Vele caught his first career touchdown in Week 10 against the Kansas City Chiefs. He finished his rookie season with 41 receptions for 475 yards and three touchdowns.

=== New Orleans Saints ===
On August 20, 2025, the Broncos traded Vele to the New Orleans Saints in exchange for a 2026 fourth-round pick (No. 108: Jonah Coleman) and a 2027 seventh-round pick. In Week 2 against the San Francisco 49ers, Vele caught his first touchdown as a Saint on a three-yard reception from Spencer Rattler. In Week 13 against the Miami Dolphins, Vele recovered a Charlie Smyth onside kick in the fourth quarter of the game; however, New Orleans went on to lose, 21–17. In 13 appearances (seven starts) for the Saints, he recorded 25 receptions for 293 yards and two touchdowns. On December 19, Vele was placed on season-ending injured reserve due to a shoulder injury suffered in Week 15 against the Carolina Panthers.

== NFL career statistics ==
Legend
**Bold**	Career high

=== Regular season ===
Year	Team	Games		Receiving					Fumbles	
Year	Team	GP	GS	Rec	Yds	Avg	Lng	TD	Fum	Lost
2024	DEN	**13**	**7**	**41**	**475**	11.6	**37**	**3**	0	0
2025	NO	**13**	**7**	25	293	**11.7**	17	2	0	0
2026	NO	5	4	25	252	10.1	31	2	0	0
Career		31	18	91	1,020	11.2	37	7	0	0

== Personal life ==
Vele was raised by a single mother, Afagaila, and later adopted by his now father, Efaraima. Vele is of Samoan descent. He is married to Tymane Vele. They have 2 children together.

Vele is a member of the Church of Jesus Christ of Latter-day Saints and served a mission in Samoa.. He is also an Eagle Scout..
