= Torricelli Simpkins III =

American football player (born 2002)

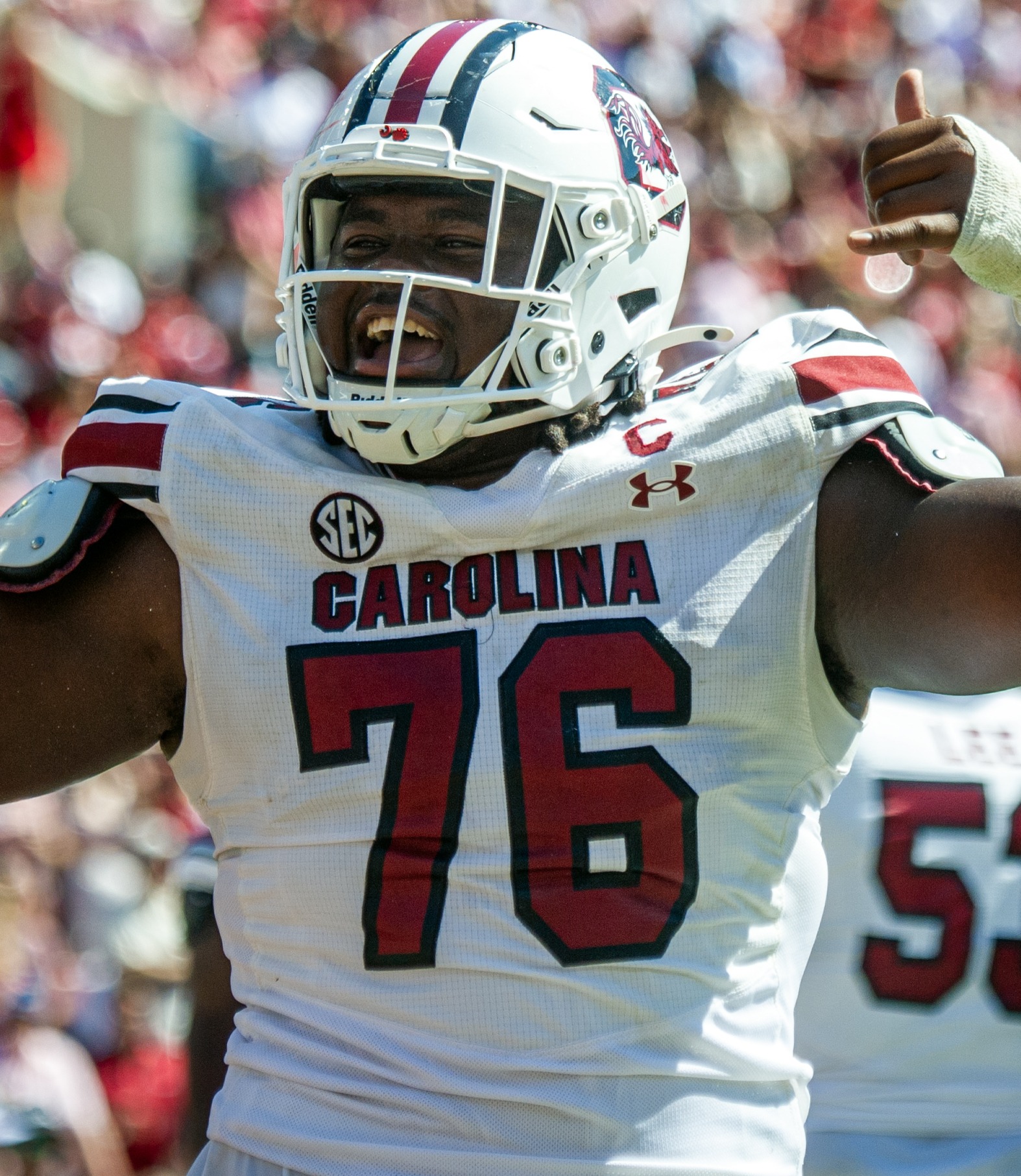
- Simpkins in 2024

No. 65 – Carolina Panthers
- Position: Guard
- Roster status: Active

Personal information
- Born: June 6, 2002 (age 24); Charlotte, North Carolina, U.S.
- Listed height: 6 ft 5 in (1.96 m)
- Listed weight: 312 lb (142 kg)

Career information
- High school: Olympic (Charlotte, North Carolina)
- College: North Carolina Central (2020–2023); South Carolina (2024)
- NFL draft: 2025: undrafted

Career history
- New Orleans Saints (2025); Carolina Panthers (2026–present)

Career NFL statistics as of 2025
- Games played: 15
- Games started: 2
- Stats at Pro Football Reference

Torricelli Simpkins III (/ˌtɔːrɪˈsɛliˈsɪmpkɪnzðəθɜːrd/ TOR-i-SEL-ee-SIMP-kinz-thə-THIRD born June 6, 2002) is an American professional football guard for the Carolina Panthers of the National Football League (NFL). He played college football for the North Carolina Central Eagles and South Carolina Gamecocks.

== Early life ==
Simpkins attended Olympic High School in Charlotte, North Carolina. He was chosen to participate in the 2019 Queen City Senior Bowl, an all-star football game that highlights high school talent in the region.

== College career ==
After graduating high school in 2020, Simpkins attended North Carolina Central University. He later transferred to the University of South Carolina for his final season. He got several awards, including the MEAC Offensive Lineman of the Year and All-America honors at North Carolina Central, and Third-Team All-SEC honors at South Carolina in 2024.

== Professional career ==
Pre-draft measurables
Height	Weight	Arm length	Hand span	Wingspan	40-yard dash	10-yard split	20-yard split	20-yard shuttle	Three-cone drill	Vertical jump	Broad jump	Bench press
6 ft 4 5/8 in (1.95 m)	312 lb (142 kg)	32 3/8 in (0.82 m)	10 1/8 in (0.26 m)	6 ft 10 1/8 in (2.09 m)	5.45 s	1.84 s	3.10 s	4.90 s	8.40 s	29.0 in (0.74 m)	9 ft 2 in (2.79 m)	18 reps
All values from NFL Combine/Pro Day

=== New Orleans Saints ===
After going undrafted in the 2025 NFL draft, Simpkins signed with the New Orleans Saints as an undrafted free agent.

On August 30, 2026, Simpkins was waived by the Saints as a part of final roster cuts.

=== Carolina Panthers ===
On September 1, 2026, Simpkins was signed to the Carolina Panthers' practice squad. On September 29, Simpkins was promoted to the active roster.
