= Kai Kroeger =

American football player (born 2002)

- Kroeger with the Houston Texans in 2026

No. 38 – Houston Texans
- Position: Punter
- Roster status: Active

Personal information
- Born: June 11, 2002 (age 24); Lake Forest, Illinois, U.S.
- Listed height: 6 ft 3 in (1.91 m)
- Listed weight: 213 lb (97 kg)

Career information
- High school: Lake Forest (IL)
- College: South Carolina (2020–2024)
- NFL draft: 2025: undrafted

Career history
- New York Jets (2025)*; New Orleans Saints (2025); Houston Texans (2026–present)
- * Offseason or practice squad member only

Awards and highlights
- First-team All-American (2022); Second-team All-American (2024); 2× First-team All-SEC (2022, 2024)

Career NFL statistics as of Week 7, 2026
- Punts: 85
- Punting yards: 3,895
- Punting average: 45.8
- Longest punt: 67
- Inside 20: 27
- Touchbacks: 4
- Stats at Pro Football Reference

Kai Kroeger (born June 11, 2002) is an American professional football punter for the Houston Texans of the National Football League (NFL). He played college football for the South Carolina Gamecocks and was signed by the New York Jets as an undrafted free agent in 2025. Considered to be the greatest punter in the history of South Carolina's football program, Kroeger is in second place for most punting yards in SEC history with 11,823. He was also renown for trick play abilities, scoring multiple touchdowns and converting downs via fake punts and field goals.

== Early life ==
Kroeger attended Lake Forest High School in Lake Forest, Illinois, where he was considered one of the nation's top punters of the 2020 class. He also spent time at quarterback on his junior varsity team before moving to wide receiver on his varsity team.

== College career ==
Kroeger came into the University of South Carolina as a true freshman starting punter in 2020. He took 39 punts with an average distance of 43.3 yards per attempt and was named to the Southeastern Conference (SEC) all-freshman team. In week six of 2021, Kroeger threw a 44-yard touchdown pass on a fake punt trick play in a loss to Tennessee. He finished the 2021 season with 59 punts for an average of 42.9 yards per punt, with 22 of his punts landing inside the 20-yard line and 2 of them going more than 70 yards.

In the 2022 season, Kroeger kicked a career-long 79-yarder, one of seven punts on the day, in a season-opening win against Georgia State. In week ten, he threw a touchdown pass to Dakereon Joyner on a fake punt, scoring South Carolina's only points in a 38–6 loss to Florida. The following week, he had a career performance in the season finale against Clemson Tigers football, kicking seven times with an average of 53.7 yards per punt, with three of them stopping inside the five-yard line. South Carolina won 31–30, its first victory over Clemson since 2013. He threw his third career touchdown to his long snapper on a fake field goal during the 2022 Gator Bowl, which the Gamecocks lost 45–38 to Notre Dame. Kroeger finished the 2022 season with 58 punts for an SEC-best 46.1 yards per attempt, with exactly half of his attempts landing inside the 20. He also went 4-for-4 passing for two touchdowns. He was named first-team All-SEC and first-team All-American by ESPN and The Athletic, though he was inexplicably omitted as a finalist for the Ray Guy Award.

Kroeger underperformed the following season in 2023, making a career-high 62 punts for an average of 43.2 yards per punt with 22 inside the 20. He returned for a fifth season in 2024, recording a career-best 47.8 yards per punt on 47 attempts and landing 18 of them inside the 20. He was named first-team All-SEC and second-team All-American by the FWAA. He finished his college career having completed 7-of-10 passes for 205 yards and three touchdowns. He also set the program record for most appearances with 61 alongside defensive lineman Tonka Hemingway.

== Professional career ==
Pre-draft measurables
Height	Weight	Arm length	Hand span	Wingspan
6 ft 3 3/8 in (1.91 m)	213 lb (97 kg)	32 in (0.81 m)	9 1/4 in (0.23 m)	6 ft 4 in (1.93 m)
All values from Pro Day

=== New York Jets ===
After going undrafted in the 2025 NFL draft, Kroeger signed with the New York Jets as an undrafted free agent on May 13, 2025. However, on July 27, Kroeger was waived by the Jets.

=== New Orleans Saints ===
On July 31, 2025, Kroeger was signed by the New Orleans Saints. He played in all 17 games for New Orleans, averaging 44.8 yards per punt, with a season-long of 61 yards.

=== Houston Texans ===
On March 11, 2026, Kroeger was traded to the Houston Texans with a 2028 seventh round draft pick in exchange for a 2028 sixth round selection.

== NFL career statistics ==
Legend
	Led the league
**Bold**	Career high

=== Regular season ===
Year	Team	GP	Punting							
Year	Team	GP	Punts	Yds	Lng	Avg	Net Avg	Blk	Ins20	RetY
2025	NO	**17**	**56**	**2,511**	**61**	**44.8**	**37.3**	**2**	**18**	**268**
2026	TEX	6	23	1,107	67	48.1	43.4	0	8	108
Career		23	79	3,618	67	48.1	43.4	2	26	376
