= Michael Reid (American football) =

American football player (born 2002)

No. 42 – New Orleans Saints
- Position: Safety
- Roster status: Active

Personal information
- Born: May 24, 2002 (age 24); Owings Mills, Maryland, U.S.
- Listed height: 6 ft 2 in (1.88 m)
- Listed weight: 200 lb (91 kg)

Career information
- High school: Owings Mills (MD)
- College: Monmouth (2020–2023); South Dakota (2024)
- NFL draft: 2025: undrafted

Career history
- Carolina Panthers (2025)*; Seattle Seahawks (2025)*; Carolina Panthers (2025–2026)*; New Orleans Saints (2026–present)
- * Offseason or practice squad member only
- Stats at Pro Football Reference

Michael Reid (born May 24, 2002) is an American professional football safety for the New Orleans Saints of the National Football League (NFL). He played college football for the Monmouth Hawks and South Dakota Coyotes. Reid has also been a member of the Carolina Panthers and Seattle Seahawks.

== Early life ==
Reid was born on May 24, 2002, and is from Owings Mills, Maryland. He attended Owings Mills High School where he competed in football as a defensive back. After high school, he enrolled at Monmouth University to play college football for the Monmouth Hawks. Reid totaled six tackles in four games as a freshman in the spring 2021 season. He made his first start in a playoff game against Sam Houston State, a team that went on to win the national championship.

Reid became a starter at Monmouth in the fall 2021 season. He posted 39 tackles that year and then was named third-team All-Colonial Athletic Association in 2022 after recording 52 tackles and a team-best 11 pass breakups, which also placed fifth in the NCAA Division I FCS. He was third-team All-CAA in 2023 while tallying 30 tackles and a team-leading eight pass breakups. Reid then transferred to the South Dakota Coyotes for his final season in 2024. He earned second-team All-Missouri Valley Football Conference honors while posting 44 tackles, eight pass breakups and two interceptions.

== Professional career ==
=== Carolina Panthers ===
After going unselected in the 2025 NFL draft, Reid signed with the Carolina Panthers as an undrafted free agent. He was waived on August 26, 2025, then re-signed to the practice squad the next day. He was released from the practice squad on October 28.

=== Seattle Seahawks ===
On November 12, 2025, Reid signed to the practice squad of the Seattle Seahawks. He was waived by the Seahawks on November 18.

=== Carolina Panthers (second stint) ===
Reid returned to the Panthers by signing with their practice squad on December 23, 2025, but was released on January 8, 2026. He signed a reserve/future contract with Carolina on January 19, 2026. Reid was waived by the Panthers again on July 25.

=== New Orleans Saints ===
On July 28, 2026, Reid signed with the New Orleans Saints. He made the team's 53-man roster entering the regular season.
