= Charlie Smyth =

Irish player of American football (born 2001)

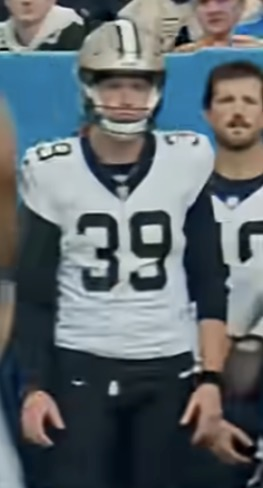
- Smyth with the New Orleans Saints in 2025

No. 39 – New Orleans Saints
- Position: Placekicker
- Roster status: Active

Personal information
- Born: 26 June 2001 (age 25); Mayobridge, Northern Ireland
- Listed height: 6 ft 4 in (1.93 m)
- Listed weight: 210 lb (95 kg)

Career history
- New Orleans Saints (2024–present)

Career statistics as of 2026
- Field goals made: 12
- Field goals attempted: 16
- Field goal %: 75%
- Extra points made: 13
- Extra points attempted: 13
- Extra point %: 100%
- Points: 49
- Longest field goal: 57
- Touchbacks: 16
- Stats at Pro Football Reference

Other information
- Gaelic games career
- Sport: Gaelic Football
- Position: Goalkeeper
Club
- Years: Club
- 2005–2024: Mayobridge
Inter-county
- Years: County
- 2023–2024: Down

Charlie Smyth (born 26 June 2001) is an Irish professional American football placekicker for the New Orleans Saints of the National Football League (NFL). He has previously played Gaelic football as a goalkeeper at senior level for the Down county team, before joining the NFL's International Player Pathway Program (IPPP) in 2024.

== Gaelic football career ==
Smyth began playing Gaelic football when he was four years old. He first came to prominence as the goalkeeper for Down's Ulster Under-20 Championship winning team in 2020, scoring in every game of the campaign that ended at the All-Ireland semi-final stage.

In 2021, Smyth was the goalkeeper on the Down winning team to lift the Ulster Under-20 title, their first since 2009. He was one of three players from Down who received honours in the EirGrid All-Ireland Under-20 football awards that year.

In 2023, he made his debut on the Down county football team and was a Tailteann Cup runner-up with Down.

== American football career ==
Smyth had sent an email to the NFL in July 2019 asking for a tryout hoping to see if his Gaelic football skills could transfer to the NFL. In January 2024, Smyth began training to play in the National Football League (NFL) via the National Football League's International Player Pathway Program. He participated in the NFL Scouting Combine where he connected on 12 of 16 field goal attempts. At his pro-day, he made 8 of 10 field goals, including one from 60 yards. On 29 March 2024, he signed a three-year contract with the New Orleans Saints, becoming the first GAA player to sign an NFL contract. He was waived on 27 August, and re-signed to the practice squad.

Smyth signed a reserve/future contract with the Saints on 6 January 2025. On 26 August, Smyth was waived by the Saints as part of final roster cuts and re-signed to the practice squad the next day. On 29 November, Smyth was elevated from the practice squad to the active roster for the first time. The next day, Smyth made his NFL debut against the Miami Dolphins, in which he made a 56-yard field goal and successfully converted an onside kick. On 14 December, he made a 47-yard winning field goal with six seconds left to help the Saints to victory over the Carolina Panthers. Smyth was signed to the active roster on 19 December on a three-year contract.

On 30 August 2026, Smyth was waived by the Saints as a part of final roster cuts; he was re-signed to the team's practice squad the following day. The Saints released Daniel Carlson on 3 November and added Smyth twice to the active roster. After he made four of five field goals, and four of four extra points, the Saints signed him to the roster for the rest of the season with a two-year contract on 21 November.

== NFL statistics ==
=== Regular season ===
General			Field goals					PATs			Kickoffs			Points
Season	Team	GP	FGM	FGA	FG%	Blck	Long	XPM	XPA	XP%	KO	Avg	TBs	Pts
2025	NO	6	12	16	75%	0	57	13	13	100%	33	58.1	16	49
Career		6	12	16	75%	0	57	13	13	100%	33	58.1	16	49

== Personal life ==
A native of Mayobridge, Newry, Smyth describes himself as Irish. He attended St Colman's College. Smyth studied at St Mary's University College, where he was completing a master's degree in physical education. Prior to that, Smyth had trained as a primary school teacher with Irish language and was ready to teach while also playing GAA with his club Mayobridge.
