= T. J. Paganetti =

American football coach (born 1989)

Philadelphia Eagles
- Title: Consultant

Personal information
- Born: August 4, 1989 (age 37); Bedford, Massachusetts, U.S.

Career information
- College: Oregon

Career history
- Oregon (2007–2012); Undergraduate offensive intern (2007-2008); Student assistant (offense and quarterbacks) (2009-2011); Offensive intern (quarterbacks) (2012); Philadelphia Eagles (2013–2014) Analyst (offense and quarterbacks); Oregon (2015-2016) Graduate assistant/linebackers coach; Philadelphia Eagles (2017–2024); Offensive quality control/assistant offensive line coach (2017-2018); Assistant running backs coach (2019-2020); Offensive quality control coach (2021-2022); Run game specialist/assistant tight ends coach (2023); Run game specialist/assistant offensive line coach (2024); New Orleans Saints (2025–2026) Run game coordinator; Philadelphia Eagles (2026–present) Consultant

Awards and highlights
- 2× Super Bowl champion (LII, LIX)

T. J. Paganetti (born August 4, 1989) is an American football coach who is a consultant for the Philadelphia Eagles, where he won Super Bowl LII and Super Bowl LIX with in multiple roles. He also served as the run game coordinator for the New Orleans Saints, and was as an assistant coach for the University of Oregon.

== Coaching career ==
=== Oregon ===
Paganetti began his coaching career while a student at the University of Oregon as an undergraduate offensive intern from 2007 until 2008. From 2009 until 2011, he served as a student assistant working with the offense and quarterbacks. In 2012, he was an offensive intern working with quarterbacks.

=== Philadelphia Eagles ===
In 2013, Paganetti was hired by the Philadelphia Eagles as an offensive analyst to serve under newly hired head coach Chip Kelly, who he coached with during his first stint at Oregon. He served in this role until 2014.

=== Oregon (second stint) ===
Paganetti returned to Oregon from 2015 until 2016 and served as a graduate assistant after graduating from college.

=== Philadelphia Eagles (second stint) ===
In 2017, Paganetti returned to Philadelphia and was hired as an offensive quality control coach and assistant offensive line coach, serving under Jeff Stoutland. He helped the Eagles win their first Super Bowl during the 2017 season. In 2019, he was promoted to the assistant running backs coach position. He was retained by newly hired head coach Nick Sirianni and served as an offensive quality control coach from 2021 until 2022 before being promoted to the run game specialist and assistant tight ends coach in 2023. He was named run game coordinator and assistant offensive line coach on February 23, 2024. He was part of the coaching staff that won Super Bowl LIX over the Kansas City Chiefs.

=== New Orleans Saints ===
On February 18, 2025, the New Orleans Saints hired Paganetti to serve as part of the team's coaching staff. Paganetti was fired by the Saints on November 4, 2026.

== Personal life ==
Paganetti received his bachelor's degree in political science from the University of Oregon in 2012.
