= Adam Gristick =

American football player and coach

New Orleans Saints
- Title: Assistant linebackers coach

Personal information
- Listed height: 6 ft 0 in (1.83 m)
- Listed weight: 228 lb (103 kg)

Career information
- Position: Linebacker
- High school: Parkland (PA)
- College: Eastern Illinois (2010–2014)

Career history
- Missouri State (2015) Defensive quality control coach; Syracuse (2016) Defensive quality control; Syracuse (2017) Graduate assistant; Eastern Illinois (2018–2019) Linebackers coach; Eastern Illinois (2020–2021) Defensive run game coordinator & linebackers coach; Eastern Illinois (2022) Defensive coordinator; New Orleans Saints (2023–2024) Defensive assistant; New Orleans Saints (2025–present) Assistant linebackers coach

Adam Gristick is an American football coach who serves as the assistant linebackers coach for the New Orleans Saints of the National Football League (NFL). He previously served as an assistant coach with the Eastern Illinois Panthers, Syracuse Orange, and Missouri State Bears.

== Playing career ==
Gristick played college football as a linebacker for the Eastern Illinois Panthers. After redshirting his first season, he played four seasons in which he recorded 191 career tackles and three interceptions. Prior to his redshirt senior season, Gristick was named team captain. During his time at Eastern Illinois, Gristick helped the Panthers to back-to-back Ohio Valley Conference championships and FCS playoff appearances in 2012-13.

== Coaching career ==
=== Early coaching career ===
After graduating from Eastern Illinois, Gristick began his coaching career at Missouri State as a defensive quality control assistant in 2015. His duties for the Bears included analyzing the passing tendencies of opponents in addition to other film work. In 2016, Gristick was hired by Syracuse as a defensive quality control coach before working as a graduate assistant the following season. In June 2018, Gristick was hired by his alma mater, Eastern Illinois, as linebackers coach and was promoted to defensive run game coordinator in 2020. During these years, he coached first team All-American linebacker Jason Johnson and second team All-OVC linebacker Dytarious Johnson. In 2022, he was promoted to defensive coordinator.

=== New Orleans Saints ===
In 2023, Gristick was hired as a defensive assistant by the New Orleans Saints. As a defensive assistant, his responsibilities included producing self-scout breakdown reports, compilation of scouting reports, breakdown of Saints opponents, the organization of playbooks, and assisting the linebackers coach with the position group during practice. In 2025, Gristick was promoted to assistant linebackers coach on Kellen Moore's staff.

== Personal life ==
In 2015, Gristick graduated with a bachelor's degree in exercise science.
