= Dennis Lauscha =

American sports executive

Dennis Lauscha is an American sports executive who is president of the NBA's New Orleans Pelicans and NFL's New Orleans Saints. He is responsible for managing various aspects of the teams, including financial operations, government affairs, marketing, ticket and suite sales, legal, arena and stadium operations, community affairs, human resources, business intelligence and information technology.

== Personal life ==
Lauscha was born and raised in New Orleans. He graduated from Jesuit High School (Class of 1987) and earned his Business degrees, initially from the University of Alabama, and later pursued an M.B.A. at Loyola University New Orleans. Lauscha's father, Dennis R. Lauscha, originated from the Bronx and later served in the U.S. Air Force. Upon relocating to New Orleans, his father became a notary public and took on the role of a Eucharistic minister. Diane, Lauscha's mother, spent several years as the secretary for the industrial supplier Certex.
