= Easton Kilty =

American football player (born 2002)

No. 73 – New Orleans Saints
- Position: Offensive tackle
- Roster status: Active

Personal information
- Born: May 1, 2002 (age 24); Marshfield, Wisconsin, U.S.
- Listed height: 6 ft 6 in (1.98 m)
- Listed weight: 307 lb (139 kg)

Career information
- High school: Stratford (Stratford, Wisconsin)
- College: North Dakota (2020–2023); Kansas State (2024)
- NFL draft: 2025: undrafted

Career history
- New Orleans Saints (2025–present)

Awards and highlights
- Second team All-Big 12 (2024)
- Stats at Pro Football Reference

Easton Kilty (born May 1, 2002) is an American professional football offensive tackle for the New Orleans Saints of the National Football League (NFL). He played college football for the North Dakota Fighting Hawks and Kansas State Wildcats.

== Early life ==
Kilty was born on May 1, 2002, in Stratford, Wisconsin, where he grew up. He attended Stratford High School where he played football as a lineman, earning two varsity letters, all-region honors and all-conference honors during his career. As a senior, Kilty was part of a team that appeared in the state championship. He committed to play college football for the North Dakota Fighting Hawks.

== College career ==
Kilty made three appearances as a true freshman at North Dakota during the 2020–21 season, then started all 11 games in 2021 as a right tackle and left guard. In 2022, he made 12 starts at right guard. Kilty started all 12 games in 2023 while playing left tackle, being named honorable mention All-Missouri Valley Football Conference (MVFC) while helping his team's quarterbacks have the third-best completion percentage in FCS college football. Kilty concluded his stint at North Dakota with 35 starts, as he entered the NCAA transfer portal and transferred to the Kansas State Wildcats for his final season in 2024. At Kansas State, he was named second-team All-Big 12 Conference and started every game while appearing at left tackle.

== Professional career ==
Pre-draft measurables
| Height | Weight | Arm length | Hand span | Wingspan | 40-yard dash | 10-yard split | 20-yard split | 20-yard shuttle | Three-cone drill | Vertical jump | Broad jump | Bench press |
|---|---|---|---|---|---|---|---|---|---|---|---|---|
| 6 ft 4 7/8 in (1.95 m) | 308 lb (140 kg) | 32 in (0.81 m) | 9 3/8 in (0.24 m) | 6 ft 6 in (1.98 m) | 5.52 s | 1.91 s | 3.18 s | 4.88 s | 7.70 s | 25.5 in (0.65 m) | 8 ft 8 in (2.64 m) | 27 reps |
All values from Pro Day

After going unselected in the 2025 NFL draft, Kilty signed with the New Orleans Saints as an undrafted free agent. He was waived on August 26, 2025, then re-signed to the practice squad the next day. He was elevated to the active roster for the team's Week 16 game against the New York Jets, but did not appear in the game. Kilty signed a reserve/future contract with the Saints after the season on January 5, 2026. He was waived on August 30, 2026, then re-signed to the practice squad the next day. Kilty was elevated to the active roster for the Saints' Week 5 game against the Minnesota Vikings and made his NFL debut in the game, appearing on two special teams snaps. He was signed to the active roster on November 14.

== Personal life ==
Kilty's sister, Macey, is a wrestler who won the gold medal at the 2024 and 2025 Pan American Wrestling Championships.
