= Chase Haslett =

American football player and coach (born 1992)

New Orleans Saints
- Title: Tight ends coach

Personal information
- Born: August 13, 1992 (age 34); Clayton, Missouri, U.S.
- Listed height: 6 ft 1 in (1.85 m)
- Listed weight: 200 lb (91 kg)

Career information
- Position: Quarterback
- High school: Clayton (MO)
- College: Illinois (2011–2013); IUP (2014–2015)

Career history
- Nebraska (2016–2017) Graduate assistant; Mississippi State (2018) Graduate assistant; Mercer (2019) Tight ends coach; Dallas Cowboys (2020–2024); Offensive quality control coach (2020-2022); Assistant tight ends coach (2023); Pass game specialist (2024); New Orleans Saints (2025–present) Tight ends coach

James Ira Chase Haslett (born August 13, 1992) is an American football coach who serves as the tight ends coach for the New Orleans Saints of the National Football League (NFL). He previously served as an assistant coach with the Dallas Cowboys, Mercer University, Mississippi State University, and University of Nebraska.

== Playing career ==
Haslett committed to playing college football at Illinois as a preferred walk-on. He was on the roster from 2011 to 2013, but did not see any game action. In 2014 he transferred to Indiana University of Pennsylvania where he played in sixteen games in 2014 and 2015 as a quarterback under head coach Curt Cignetti.

== Coaching career ==
=== Early career ===
After finishing his playing career at IUP, Haslett joined Nebraska as a graduate assistant. He primarily worked with quarterbacks and offensive quality control. In 2018, he continued his work as a graduate assistant at Mississippi State. The following year, Haslett was hired as tight ends coach for the Mercer Bears.

=== Dallas Cowboys ===
Chase Haslett began his tenure with the Dallas Cowboys in 2020 as an offensive quality control coach. After three seasons in that role, he was promoted to assistant tight ends coach in 2023. In 2024, he advanced to pass game specialist.

=== New Orleans Saints ===
In February 2025, Haslett joined the New Orleans Saints as their tight ends coach, reuniting with head coach Kellen Moore, with whom he had previously worked in Dallas.

== Personal life ==
Haslett is the son of Beth and Jim Haslett. His father played football at IUP as a linebacker and would go on to win 1979 NFL Defensive Rookie of the Year after being drafted. He would also go on to become a coach winning NFL Coach of the Year in 2000 with the New Orleans Saints.

Haslett earned a degree in sports management.
