= Grady Brown (American football) =

American football coach (born 1977)

New Orleans Saints
- Title: Cornerbacks coach

Personal information
- Born: June 13, 1977 (age 49); Birmingham, Alabama, U.S.

Career information
- Position: Defensive back
- High school: Wenonah (Birmingham)
- College: Alabama A&M (1995–1998)

Career history

Playing
- Tennessee Valley Vipers (2000)

Coaching
- Alabama A&M (2000) Graduate assistant; Alabama A&M (2001) Outside linebackers coach; Alabama State (2002–2007) Secondary coach; Seattle Seahawks (2004) Bill Walsh Diversity Coaching Fellowship; Kansas City Chiefs (2007) Bill Walsh Diversity Coaching Fellowship; Texas Southern (2008) Safeties coach; LSU (2009) Defensive quality control; Southern Miss (2010–2011) Cornerbacks coach; South Carolina (2012–2014) Secondary coach; South Carolina (2015) Cornerbacks coach; Birmingham–Southern (2016) Defensive coordinator; Alabama State (2017) Safeties coach; Louisville (2018) Cornerbacks coach; Old Dominion (2019) Co-defensive coordinator & Defensive backs coach; McNeese State (2020) Defensive coordinator; Pittsburgh Steelers (2021–2024) Secondary coach; New Orleans Saints (2025–present) Cornerbacks coach

Grady Brown (born June 13, 1977) is an American professional football coach who is the cornerbacks coach for the New Orleans Saints of the National Football League (NFL).

== Coaching career ==
Brown began coaching in 2000 when he accepted a role as a graduate assistant at his alma mater Alabama A&M. He continued to coach defensive backs, accepting jobs at Alabama State and Texas Southern.

After his stint at Texas Southern, Brown moved to coaching in the FBS, accepting positions at LSU, Southern Miss, and South Carolina. He then took a job as defensive coordinator at Birmingham Southern. That season the Panthers went 1-9 and Brown left the school, accepting roles at Alabama State, Louisville, and Old Dominion in the years following. In 2020, Brown took a job with McNeese State but, just days before the start of the spring season, Brown took a job at Houston. Less than a week later, Brown took a job with the Pittsburgh Steelers of the NFL.

In 2021, Brown transitioned to the NFL, joining the Pittsburgh Steelers as secondary coach. Over his three-year tenure with the team, Pittsburgh’s defense accumulated 66 interceptions, placing them third in the league in that category during that period. His NFL experience was complemented by his selection as the defensive coordinator for the National team at the 2023 Senior Bowl. In 2025, Brown was hired by the New Orleans Saints as their defensive backs coach. He joins the staff with the objective of improving a pass defense that ranked 27th in the NFL the previous season.

== Personal life ==
Brown graduated from Alabama A&M with a degree in mathematics education in 2000. He is married to Rashidah Brown.
