= 2023 Atlanta Falcons season =

58th season in franchise history

- Owner: Arthur Blank
- General manager: Terry Fontenot
- Head coach: Arthur Smith
- Home stadium: Mercedes-Benz Stadium

Results
- Record: 7–10
- Division place: 3rd NFC South
- Playoffs: Did not qualify
- All-Pros: G Chris Lindstrom (2nd team); S Jessie Bates (2nd team)
- Pro Bowlers: G Chris Lindstrom; S Jessie Bates

Uniform
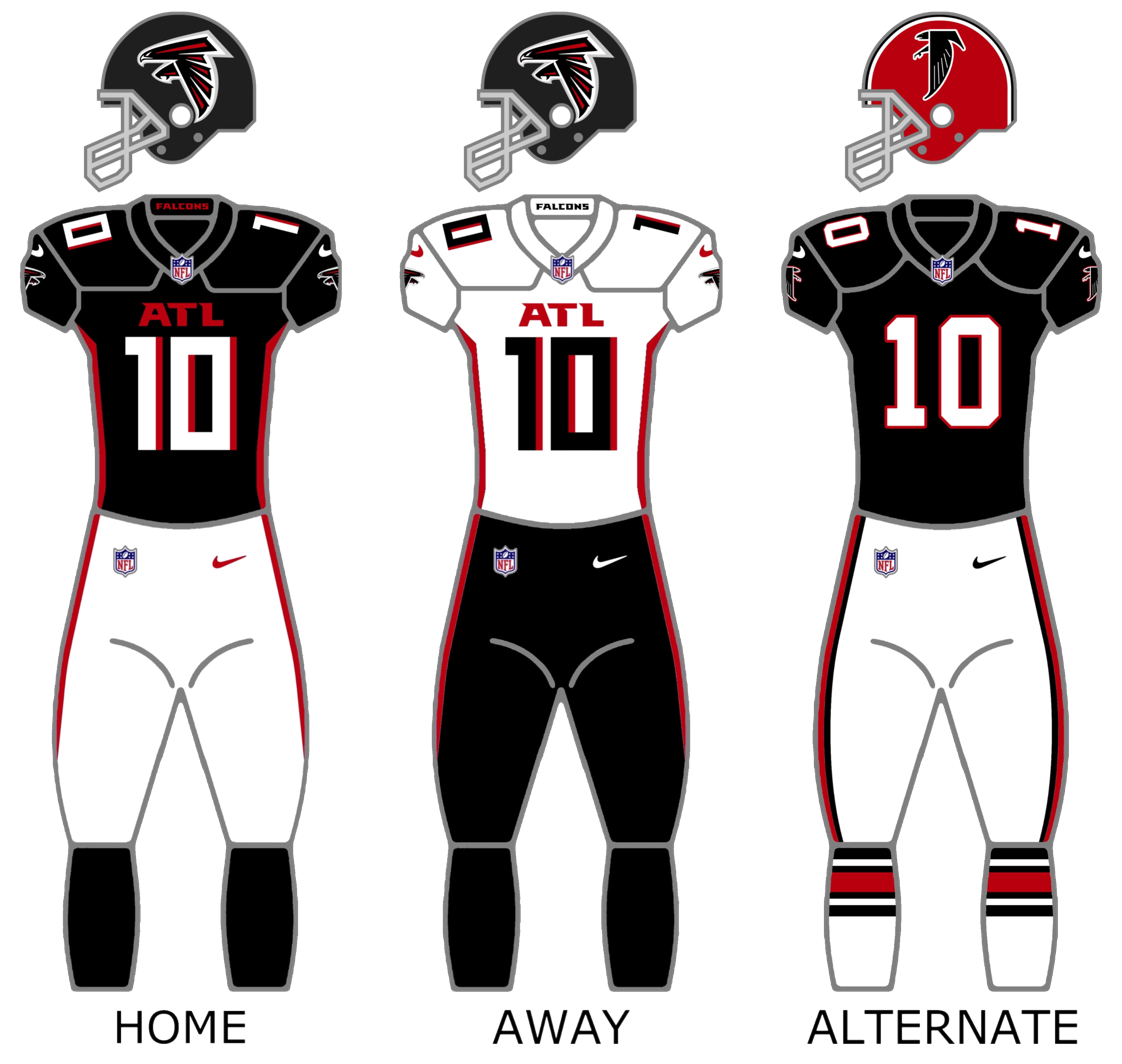

The 2023 season was the Atlanta Falcons' 58th in the National Football League (NFL), their seventh playing their home games at Mercedes-Benz Stadium, their third under general manager Terry Fontenot and third and final season under head coach Arthur Smith. The Falcons attempted to improve upon their 7–10 record from the previous two years and return to the playoffs for the first time since 2017. Despite starting 2–0, the first time since 2017 they won a season opener and had a winning record at some point, their struggles caught up to them, as after being 1st place in the NFC South, the team finished 1–4 in their final five games. Atlanta matched their previous two outputs of seven wins with a victory over the Indianapolis Colts in Week 16. However, they were eliminated from playoff contention when the division rival Tampa Bay Buccaneers defeated the Carolina Panthers in Week 18.

On January 8, 2024, the Falcons fired head coach Arthur Smith, who finished his tenure in Atlanta with a 21–30 (.412) record.

== Draft ==
2023 Atlanta Falcons draft selections
Round	Selection	Player	Position	College	Notes
1	8	Bijan Robinson	RB	Texas	
2	38	Matthew Bergeron	OT	Syracuse	From Raiders via Colts (Note: The Falcons traded their second round selection (44th overall) and their fourth round selection (110th overall) to the Indianapolis Colts in exchange for the (38th overall) pick.)
2	44	Traded to the Indianapolis Colts			
3	75	Zach Harrison	DE	Ohio State	
4	110	Traded to the Indianapolis Colts			From Titans (Note: The Falcons traded a sixth-round selection (186th overall) and WR Julio Jones to the Tennessee Titans in exchange for a fourth-round selection (110th overall) and a 2022 second-round selection.)
4	113	Clark Phillips III	CB	Utah	
5	144	Traded to the Las Vegas Raiders (Note: The Falcons traded a fifth-round selection (144th overall) to the Las Vegas Raiders in exchange for a seventh-round selection (224th overall) and WR Bryan Edwards.)			
5	159	Traded to the Detroit Lions (Note: The Falcons traded a fifth-round selection (159th overall) to the Detroit Lions in exchange for CB Jeff Okudah.)			From Jaguars (Note: The Falcons traded WR Calvin Ridley to the Jacksonville Jaguars in exchange for a fifth-round selection (159th overall) and a conditional 2024 fourth-round selection.)
6	186	Traded to the Tennessee Titans			
7	224	DeMarcco Hellams	S	Alabama	From Raiders
7	225	Jovaughn Gwyn	G	South Carolina	
7	245	Traded to the New England Patriots (Note: The Falcons traded a seventh-round selection (245th overall) to the New England Patriots in exchange for TE Jonnu Smith.)			From Bills (Note: The Falcons traded S Dean Marlowe to the Buffalo Bills in exchange for a seventh-round selection (245th overall).)

2023 Atlanta Falcons undrafted free agents
Name	Position	College	Ref.
Natrone Brooks	CB	Southern Miss	
Ikenna Enechukwu	DE	Rice	
Keilahn Harris	WR	Oklahoma Baptist	
Mike Jones Jr.	LB	LSU	
Xavier Malone	WR	Henderson State	
Justin Marshall	WR	Buffalo	
Carlos Washington Jr.	RB	Southeastern Louisiana	

Draft trades

== Staff ==
2023 Atlanta Falcons staff
Front office: Owner/chairman – Arthur Blank; CEO – Rich McKay; President – Greg Beadles; General manager – Terry Fontenot; Assistant general manager – Kyle Smith; Director of player personnel – Ryan Pace; Director of coaching operations – Brian Griffin; Assistant director of college scouting – Duwane Jones; Senior director of football administration – Chris Olsen; Senior personnel executive – Ruston Webster; Head coaches: Head coach – Arthur Smith; Assistant head coach/defense – Jerry Gray; Offensive coaches: Offensive coordinator – Dave Ragone; Running backs – Michael Pitre; Receivers – T. J. Yates; Assistant wide receivers – Nick Perry; Tight ends – Justin Peelle; Offensive line – Dwayne Ledford; Offensive line assistant – Mateo Kambui; Assistant offensive line – Shawn Flaherty; Offensive assistant – Steven King; Offensive assistant – Patrick Kramer	Defensive coaches: Defensive coordinator – Ryan Nielsen; Linebackers – Frank Bush; Secondary – Steve Jackson; Senior defensive assistant – Dave Huxtable; Defensive assistant – Matt Pees; Defensive front specialist – Lanier Goethie; Special projects/defense – Mario Jeberaeel; Special teams coaches: Special teams coordinator – Marquice Williams; Special teams assistant - Matt Baker; Senior assistant – Steve Hoffman; Strength and conditioning: Head strength and conditioning – Dr. Thomas Stallworth; Assistant strength and conditioning – Roderick Moore Jr; Assistant strength and conditioning – Bobby Thomas

== Final roster ==
2023 Atlanta Falcons roster
Quarterbacks (QB): 4 Taylor Heinicke; 9 Desmond Ridder; 11 Logan Woodside; Running backs (RB): 25 Tyler Allgeier; 84 Cordarrelle Patterson; 7 Bijan Robinson; Wide receivers (WR): 12 KhaDarel Hodge; 18 Mack Hollins; 15 Van Jefferson; 5 Drake London; 16 Scotty Miller; Tight ends (TE): 43 Tucker Fisk; 87 John FitzPatrick; 8 Kyle Pitts; 85 MyCole Pruitt; 81 Jonnu Smith	Offensive linemen (OL): 65 Matthew Bergeron G; 67 Drew Dalman C; 56 Jovaughn Gwyn G/C; 68 Kyle Hinton G; 63 Chris Lindstrom G; 70 Jake Matthews T; 76 Kaleb McGary T; 64 Ryan Neuzil C; 77 Storm Norton T; Defensive linemen (DL): 93 Calais Campbell DE; 99 Joe Gaziano DE; 95 Ta'Quon Graham DE; 96 Zach Harrison DE; 94 Albert Huggins; 72 LaCale London NT; 90 David Onyemata NT; 62 Tommy Togiai DE	Linebackers (LB): 0 Lorenzo Carter OLB; 48 Bud Dupree OLB; 17 Arnold Ebiketie OLB; 55 Kaden Elliss ILB; 53 Nate Landman ILB; 51 DeAngelo Malone OLB; 59 Andre Smith ILB; Defensive backs (DB): 29 Micah Abernathy FS; 20 Dee Alford CB; 3 Jessie Bates FS; 33 Tre Flowers CB; 27 Richie Grant SS; 37 DeMarcco Hellams SS; 21 Mike Hughes CB; 1 Jeff Okudah CB; 34 Clark Phillips III CB; 24 A. J. Terrell CB; Special teams (ST): 6 Younghoe Koo K; 49 Liam McCullough LS; 13 Bradley Pinion P	Practice squad: 83 Chris Blair WR; 35 Natrone Brooks CB; 88 Frank Darby WR; 74 Carlos Davis NT; 41 Lukas Denis SS; 52 Milo Eifler ILB; 42 Frank Ginda ILB; 91 Demone Harris OLB; 46 Parker Hesse TE; 66 John Leglue G/T; 45 Donavan Mutin ILB; 54 Justin Shaffer G; 50 Ryan Swoboda T; 38 Arnold Tarpley III FS; 73 Tyler Vrabel T; 28 Carlos Washington Jr. RB; 69 Barry Wesley T (PS/I); Reserve: 80 Josh Ali WR (IR); 44 Troy Andersen ILB (IR/DFR); 79 Ikenna Enechukwu DE (IR); 15 Feleipe Franks TE (IR); -- Eddie Goldman NT (Left squad); 71 Ethan Greenidge T (IR); 61 Matt Hennessy C (IR); 97 Grady Jarrett DE (IR); 92 Ade Ogundeji OLB (IR); 40 Keith Smith FB (IR); 75 Kentavius Street DE (IR); 26 Avery Williams RB (IR); Rookies in italics 53 active, 12 reserve, 16 practice squad (1 exempt)

== Preseason ==
Week	Date	Opponent	Result	Record	Venue	Recap
1	August 11	at Miami Dolphins	W 19–3	1–0	Hard Rock Stadium	Recap
2	August 18	Cincinnati Bengals	T 13–13	1–0–1	Mercedes-Benz Stadium	Recap
3	August 24	Pittsburgh Steelers	L 0–24	1–1–1	Mercedes-Benz Stadium	Recap

== Regular season ==
=== Schedule ===
Week	Date	Opponent	Result	Record	Venue	Recap
1	September 10	**Carolina Panthers**	**W** 24–10	1–0	Mercedes-Benz Stadium	Recap
2	September 17	Green Bay Packers	**W** 25–24	2–0	Mercedes-Benz Stadium	Recap
3	September 24	at Detroit Lions	**L** 6–20	2–1	Ford Field	Recap
4	October 1	at Jacksonville Jaguars	**L** 7–23	2–2	(United Kingdom) Wembley Stadium (London)	Recap
5	October 8	Houston Texans	**W** 21–19	3–2	Mercedes-Benz Stadium	Recap
6	October 15	Washington Commanders	**L** 16–24	3–3	Mercedes-Benz Stadium	Recap
7	October 22	at **Tampa Bay Buccaneers**	**W** 16–13	4–3	Raymond James Stadium	Recap
8	October 29	at Tennessee Titans	**L** 23–28	4–4	Nissan Stadium	Recap
9	November 5	Minnesota Vikings	**L** 28–31	4–5	Mercedes-Benz Stadium	Recap
10	November 12	at Arizona Cardinals	**L** 23–25	4–6	State Farm Stadium	Recap
11	Bye					
12	November 26	**New Orleans Saints**	**W** 24–15	5–6	Mercedes-Benz Stadium	Recap
13	December 3	at New York Jets	**W** 13–8	6–6	MetLife Stadium	Recap
14	December 10	**Tampa Bay Buccaneers**	**L** 25–29	6–7	Mercedes-Benz Stadium	Recap
15	December 17	at **Carolina Panthers**	**L** 7–9	6–8	Bank of America Stadium	Recap
16	December 24	Indianapolis Colts	**W** 29–10	7–8	Mercedes-Benz Stadium	Recap
17	December 31	at Chicago Bears	**L** 17–37	7–9	Soldier Field	Recap
18	January 7	at **New Orleans Saints**	**L** 17–48	7–10	Caesars Superdome	Recap

Note: Intra-division opponents are in bold text.

=== Game summaries ===
==== Week 1: vs. Carolina Panthers ====
Week 1: Carolina Panthers at Atlanta Falcons – Game summary

Quarter	1	2	3	4	Total
Panthers	0	7	3	0	**10**
**Falcons**	0	7	3	14	**24**

at Mercedes-Benz Stadium, Atlanta, Georgia

- Date: September 10
- Game time: 1:00 p.m. EDT
- Game weather: None (retractable roof closed)
- Game attendance: 69,597
- Referee: Brad Rogers
- TV announcers (Fox): Chris Myers, Robert Smith and Jen Hale
- Recap, Game Book

Game information

**First quarter**

- No scoring plays.

**Second quarter**

- ATL – Bijan Robinson 11-yard pass from Desmond Ridder (Younghoe Koo kick), 14:54. Falcons 7–0. **Drive: 3 plays, 17 yards, 1:07.**
- CAR – Hayden Hurst 4-yard pass from Bryce Young (Eddy Piñeiro kick), 5:09. Tied 7–7. **Drive: 12 plays, 75 yards, 7:18.**

**Third quarter**

- CAR – Eddy Piñeiro 43-yard field goal, 10:46. Panthers 10–7. **Drive: 9 plays, 50 yards, 4:14.**
- ATL – Younghoe Koo 49-yard field goal, 4:52. Tied 10–10. **Drive: 4 plays, 5 yards, 1:46.**

**Fourth quarter**

- ATL – Tyler Allgeier 3-yard run (Younghoe Koo kick), 14:12. Falcons 17–10. **Drive: 7 plays, 61 yards, 3:12.**
- ATL – Tyler Allgeier 3-yard run (Younghoe Koo kick), 4:48. Falcons 24–10. **Drive: 6 plays, 56 yards, 2:21.**

**Top passers**

- CAR – Bryce Young – 20/38, 146 yards, TD, 2 INT
- ATL – Desmond Ridder – 15/18, 115 yards, TD

**Top rushers**

- CAR – Miles Sanders – 18 rushes, 72 yards
- ATL – Tyler Allgeier – 15 rushes, 75 yards, 2 TD

**Top receivers**

- CAR – Hayden Hurst – 5 receptions, 41 yards
- ATL – Kyle Pitts – 2 receptions, 44 yards

==== Week 2: vs. Green Bay Packers ====
Week 2: Green Bay Packers at Atlanta Falcons – Game summary

Quarter	1	2	3	4	Total
Packers	0	10	14	0	**24**
**Falcons**	3	6	3	13	**25**

at Mercedes-Benz Stadium, Atlanta, Georgia

- Date: September 17
- Game time: 1:00 p.m. EDT
- Game weather: None (retractable roof closed)
- Game attendance: 69,251
- Referee: Tra Blake
- TV announcers (Fox): Kenny Albert, Jonathan Vilma and Shannon Spake
- Recap, Game Book

Game information

**First quarter**

- ATL – Younghoe Koo 24-yard field goal, 3:50. Falcons 3–0. **Drive: 15 plays, 67 yards, 6:43.**

**Second quarter**

- GB – Jayden Reed 9-yard pass from Jordan Love (Anders Carlson kick), 13:33. Packers 7–3. **Drive: 11 plays, 84 yards, 5:17.**
- GB – Anders Carlson 33-yard field goal, 3:06. Packers 10–3. **Drive: 10 plays, 44 yards, 5:45.**
- ATL – Drake London 3-yard pass from Desmond Ridder (kick failed), 0:12. Packers 10–9. **Drive: 11 plays, 75 yards, 2:54.**

**Third quarter**

- GB – Dontayvion Wicks 32-yard pass from Jordan Love (Anders Carlson kick), 10:31. Packers 17–9. **Drive: 6 plays, 65 yards, 3:58.**
- ATL – Younghoe Koo 33-yard field goal, 3:07. Packers 17–12. **Drive: 13 plays, 60 yards, 7:24.**
- GB – Jayden Reed 10-yard pass from Jordan Love (Anders Carlson kick), 0:56. Packers 24–12. **Drive: 4 plays, 78 yards, 2:11.**

**Fourth quarter**

- ATL – Desmond Ridder 6-yard run (Younghoe Koo kick), 11:48. Packers 24–19. **Drive: 8 plays, 75 yards, 4:08.**
- ATL – Younghoe Koo 39-yard field goal, 8:10. Packers 24–22. **Drive: 8 plays, 44 yards, 2:41.**
- ATL – Younghoe Koo 25-yard field goal, 0:57. Falcons 25–24. **Drive: 12 plays, 66 yards, 5:10.**
- GB – Jordan Love – 14/25, 151 yards, 3 TD
- ATL – Desmond Ridder – 19/32, 237 yards, TD, INT

**Top rushers**

- GB – A. J. Dillon – 15 rushes, 55 yards
- ATL – Bijan Robinson – 19 rushes, 124 yards

**Top receivers**

- GB – Jayden Reed – 4 receptions, 37 yards, 2 TD
- ATL – Drake London – 6 receptions, 67 yards, TD

==== Week 3: at Detroit Lions ====
Week 3: Atlanta Falcons at Detroit Lions – Game summary

Quarter	1	2	3	4	Total
Falcons	0	3	0	3	**6**
**Lions**	3	10	0	7	**20**

at Ford Field, Detroit, Michigan

- Date: September 24
- Game time: 1:00 p.m. EDT
- Game weather: None (indoor stadium)
- Game attendance: 63,803
- Referee: Carl Cheffers
- TV announcers (Fox): Adam Amin, Mark Schlereth and Kristina Pink
- Recap, Game Book

Game information

**First quarter**

- DET – Riley Patterson 37-yard field goal, 1:46. Lions 3–0. **Drive: 11 plays, 48 yards, 6:31.**

**Second quarter**

- ATL – Younghoe Koo 48-yard field goal, 11:32. Tied 3–3. **Drive: 10 plays, 45 yards, 5:14.**
- DET – Sam LaPorta 45-yard pass from Jared Goff (Riley Patterson kick), 10:05. Lions 10–3. **Drive: 5 plays, 75 yards, 1:27.**
- DET – Riley Patterson 24-yard field goal, 1:53. Lions 13–3. **Drive: 13 plays, 67 yards, 7:09.**

**Third quarter**

- No scoring plays.

**Fourth quarter**

- DET – Jared Goff 3-yard run (Riley Patterson kick), 9:50. Lions 20–3. **Drive: 7 plays, 62 yards, 3:52.**
- ATL – Younghoe Koo 24-yard field goal, 4:19. Lions 20–6. **Drive: 17 plays, 76 yards, 5:31.**

**Top passers**

- ATL – Desmond Ridder – 21/38, 201 yards
- DET – Jared Goff – 22/33, 243 yards, TD, INT

**Top rushers**

- ATL – Bijan Robinson – 10 rushes, 33 yards
- DET – Jahmyr Gibbs – 17 rushes, 80 yards

**Top receivers**

- ATL – Kyle Pitts – 5 receptions, 41 yards
- DET – Amon-Ra St. Brown – 9 receptions, 102 yards

==== Week 4: at Jacksonville Jaguars ====
NFL London games

Week 4: Atlanta Falcons at Jacksonville Jaguars – Game summary

Quarter	1	2	3	4	Total
Falcons	0	0	7	0	**7**
**Jaguars**	7	10	0	6	**23**

at Wembley Stadium, London, England

- Date: October 1
- Game time: 1:30 p.m. BST/9:30 a.m. EDT
- Game weather: Cloudy, 72 °F (22 °C)
- Game attendance: 85,716
- Referee: Craig Wrolstad
- TV announcers (WSB/ESPN+): Chris Fowler, Louis Riddick, Dan Orlovsky and Laura Rutledge
- Recap, Game Book

Game information

**First quarter**

- JAX – Calvin Ridley 30-yard pass from Trevor Lawrence (Brandon McManus kick), 5:44. Jaguars 7–0. **Drive: 8 plays, 72 yards, 3:49.**

**Second quarter**

- JAX – Brandon McManus 56-yard field goal, 14:51. Jaguars 10–0. **Drive: 8 plays, 46 yards, 3:32.**
- JAX – Darious Williams 61-yard interception return (Brandon McManus kick), 4:31. Jaguars 17–0.

**Third quarter**

- ATL – Drake London 15-yard pass from Desmond Ridder (Younghoe Koo kick), 11:38. Jaguars 17–7. **Drive: 8 plays, 75 yards, 3:22.**

**Fourth quarter**

- JAX – Brandon McManus 43-yard field goal, 10:36. Jaguars 20–7. **Drive: 13 plays, 65 yards, 7:21.**
- JAX – Brandon McManus 38-yard field goal, 1:56. Jaguars 23–7. **Drive: 10 plays, 74 yards, 4:05.**

**Top passers**

- ATL – Desmond Ridder – 19/31, 191 yards, TD, 2 INT
- JAX – Trevor Lawrence – 23/30, 207 yards, TD

**Top rushers**

- ATL – Bijan Robinson – 14 rushes, 105 yards
- JAX – Travis Etienne – 20 rushes, 55 yards

**Top receivers**

- ATL – Jonnu Smith – 6 receptions, 95 yards
- JAX – Christian Kirk – 8 receptions, 84 yards

==== Week 5: vs. Houston Texans ====
Week 5: Houston Texans at Atlanta Falcons – Game summary

Quarter	1	2	3	4	Total
Texans	3	6	3	7	**19**
**Falcons**	7	0	0	14	**21**

at Mercedes-Benz Stadium, Atlanta, Georgia

- Date: October 8
- Game time: 1:00 p.m. EDT
- Game weather: Sunny, 63 °F (17 °C) (retractable roof open)
- Game attendance: 69,461
- Referee: Shawn Hochuli
- TV announcers (Fox): Brandon Gaudin, Mark Schlereth and Kristina Pink
- Recap, Game Book

Game information

**First quarter**

- HOU — Kaʻimi Fairbairn 38-yard field goal, 10:38. Texans 3–0. **Drive: 6 plays. 28 yards, 2:56.**
- ATL — Desmond Ridder 7-yard run (Younghoe Koo kick), 6:48. Falcons 7–3. **Drive: 7 plays, 75 yards, 3:50.**

**Second quarter**

- HOU – Kaʻimi Fairbairn 43-yard field goal, 14:10. Falcons 7–6. **Drive: 7 plays, 49 yards, 2:59.**
- HOU – Kaʻimi Fairbairn 28-yard field goal, 0:03. Texans 9–7. **Drive: 10 plays, 79 yards, 1:42.**

**Third quarter**

- HOU — Kaʻimi Fairbairn 42-yard field goal, 9:35. Texans 12–7. **Drive: 4 plays, 6 yards, 1:19.**

**Fourth quarter**

- ATL – Bijan Robinson 6-yard pass from Desmond Ridder (Desmond Ridder–Tyler Allgeier pass), 12:12. Falcons 15–12. **Drive: 13 plays, 74 yards, 6:41.**
- ATL – Younghoe Koo 33-yard field goal, 6:57. Falcons 18–12. **Drive: 9 plays, 59 yards, 4:15.**
- HOU – Dalton Schultz 18-yard pass from C. J. Stroud (Kaʻimi Fairbairn kick), 1:49. Texans 19–18. **Drive: 11 plays, 75 yards, 5:08.**
- ATL – Younghoe Koo 37-yard field goal, 0:00. Falcons 21–19. **Drive: 10 plays, 56 yards, 1:49.**

**Top passers**

- HOU – C. J. Stroud – 20/35, 249 yards, TD
- ATL – Desmond Ridder – 28/37, 329 yards, TD

**Top rushers**

- HOU – Dameon Pierce – 20 rushes, 66 yards
- ATL – Bijan Robinson – 14 rushes, 46 yards

**Top receivers**

- HOU – Dalton Schultz – 7 receptions, 65 yards, TD
- ATL – Kyle Pitts – 7 receptions, 87 yards

==== Week 6: vs. Washington Commanders ====
Week 6: Washington Commanders at Atlanta Falcons – Game summary

Quarter	1	2	3	4	Total
**Commanders**	3	14	7	0	**24**
Falcons	7	3	0	6	**16**

at Mercedes-Benz Stadium, Atlanta, Georgia

- Date: October 15
- Game time: 1:00 p.m. EDT
- Game weather: None (retractable roof closed)
- Game attendance: 69,921
- Referee: Clete Blakeman
- TV announcers (CBS): Andrew Catalon, Tiki Barber, Matt Ryan and AJ Ross
- Recap, Game Book

Game information

**First quarter**

- WAS – Joey Slye 37-yard field goal, 8:45. Commanders 3–0. **Drive: 12 plays, 56 yards, 6:15.**
- ATL – Kyle Pitts 9-yard pass from Desmond Ridder (Younghoe Koo kick), 2:46. Falcons 7–3. **Drive: 11 plays, 75 yards, 5:59.**

**Second quarter**

- WAS – Antonio Gibson 1-yard pass from Sam Howell (Joey Slye kick), 11:47. Commanders 10–7. **Drive: 3 plays, 11 yards, 1:30.**
- WAS – Curtis Samuel 7-yard pass from Sam Howell (Joey Slye kick), 5:18. Commanders 17–7. **Drive: 7 plays, 52 yards, 3:02.**
- ATL – Younghoe Koo 47-yard field goal, 1:31. Commanders 17–10. **Drive: 10 plays, 46 yards, 3:47.**

**Third quarter**

- WAS – Brian Robinson Jr. 24-yard pass from Sam Howell (Joey Slye kick), 12:03. Commanders 24–10. **Drive: 2 plays, 27 yards, 0:52.**

**Fourth quarter**

- ATL – Jonnu Smith 2-yard pass from Desmond Ridder (run failed), 12:38. Commanders 24–16. **Drive: 12 plays, 81 yards, 6:53.**

**Top passers**

- WAS – Sam Howell – 14/23, 151 yards, 3 TD
- ATL – Desmond Ridder – 28/47, 307 yards, 2 TD, 3 INT

**Top rushers**

- WAS – Brian Robinson Jr. – 10 rushes, 31 yards
- ATL – Tyler Allgeier – 13 rushes, 51 yards

**Top receivers**

- WAS – Terry McLaurin – 6 receptions, 81 yards
- ATL – Drake London – 9 receptions, 125 yards

==== Week 7: at Tampa Bay Buccaneers ====
Week 7: Atlanta Falcons at Tampa Bay Buccaneers – Game summary

Quarter	1	2	3	4	Total
**Falcons**	7	3	3	3	**16**
Buccaneers	7	3	0	3	**13**

at Raymond James Stadium, Tampa, Florida

- Date: October 22
- Game time: 1:00 p.m. EDT
- Game weather: Cloudy, 79 °F (26 °C)
- Game attendance: 62,620
- Referee: Ronald Torbert
- TV announcers (Fox): Chris Myers, Mark Schlereth and Kristina Pink
- Recap, Game Book

Game information

**First quarter**

- ATL — Desmond Ridder 2-yard run (Younghoe Koo kick), 6:48. Falcons 7–0. **Drive: 8 plays, 58 yards, 3:51.**
- TB – Mike Evans 40-yard pass from Baker Mayfield (Chase McLaughlin kick), 3:24. Tied 7–7. **Drive: 7 plays, 67 yards, 3:24.**

**Second quarter**

- ATL – Younghoe Koo 24-yard field goal, 11:51. Falcons 10–7. **Drive: 8 plays, 62 yards, 3:00.**
- TB – Chase McLaughlin 24-yard field goal, 5:14. Tied 10–10. **Drive: 15 plays, 76 yards, 6:37.**

**Third quarter**

- ATL – Younghoe Koo 41-yard field goal, 2:04. Falcons 13–10. **Drive: 8 plays, 40 yards, 3:55.**

**Fourth quarter**

- TB – Chase McLaughlin 36-yard field goal, 0:45. Tied 13–13. **Drive: 10 plays, 49 yards, 1:51.**
- ATL – Younghoe Koo 51-yard field goal, 0:00. Falcons 16–13. **Drive: 5 plays, 42 yards, 0:45.**

**Top passers**

- ATL – Desmond Ridder – 19/25, 250 yards
- TB – Baker Mayfield – 27/42, 275 yards, TD, INT

**Top rushers**

- ATL – Tyler Allgeier – 21 rushes, 59 yards
- TB – Rachaad White – 13 rushes, 34 yards

**Top receivers**

- ATL – Drake London – 6 receptions, 54 yards
- TB – Mike Evans – 6 receptions, 82 yards, TD

==== Week 8: at Tennessee Titans ====
Week 8: Atlanta Falcons at Tennessee Titans – Game summary

Quarter	1	2	3	4	Total
Falcons	3	0	6	14	**23**
**Titans**	7	7	7	7	**28**

at Nissan Stadium, Nashville, Tennessee

- Date: October 29
- Game time: 1:00 p.m. EDT/12:00 p.m. CDT
- Game weather: Cloudy, 77 °F (25 °C)
- Game attendance: 68,008
- Referee: Clay Martin
- TV announcers (CBS): Beth Mowins, James Lofton, Jay Feely and Amanda Guerra
- Recap, Game Book

Game information

**First quarter**

- ATL – Younghoe Koo 29-yard field goal, 9:47. Falcons 3–0. **Drive: 7 plays, 18 yards, 3:15.**
- TEN — DeAndre Hopkins 47-yard pass from Will Levis (Nick Folk kick), 2:28. Titans 7–3. **Drive: 4 plays, 61 yards, 1:52.**

**Second quarter**

- TEN — DeAndre Hopkins 16-yard pass from Will Levis (Nick Folk kick), 5:27. Titans 14–3. **Drive: 5 plays, 33 yards, 2:50.**

**Third quarter**

- ATL – Younghoe Koo 49-yard field goal, 12:06. Titans 14–6. **Drive: 7 plays, 44 yards, 2:54.**
- ATL – Younghoe Koo 39-yard field goal, 3:02. Titans 14–9. **Drive: 11 plays, 59 yards, 4:06.**
- TEN — DeAndre Hopkins 61-yard pass from Will Levis (Nick Folk kick), 1:37. Titans 21–9. **Drive: 3 plays, 75 yards, 1:25.**

**Fourth quarter**

- ATL – Bijan Robinson 13-yard run (Younghoe Koo kick), 14:17. Titans 21–16. **Drive: 5 plays, 75 yards, 2:20.**
- TEN — Nick Westbrook-Ikhine 33-yard pass from Will Levis (Nick Folk kick), 6:59. Titans 28–16. **Drive: 9 plays, 85 yards, 4:52.**
- ATL — Scotty Miller 8-yard pass from Taylor Heinicke (Younghoe Koo kick), 3:46. Titans 28–23. **Drive: 8 plays, 75 yards, 3:13.**

**Top passers**

- ATL – Taylor Heinicke – 12/21, 175 yards, TD
- TEN – Will Levis – 19/29, 238 yards, 4 TD

**Top rushers**

- ATL – Bijan Robinson – 11 rushes, 62 yards, TD
- TEN – Derrick Henry – 22 rushes, 101 yards

**Top receivers**

- ATL – Drake London – 5 receptions, 55 yards
- TEN – DeAndre Hopkins – 4 receptions, 128 yards, 3 TD

==== Week 9: vs. Minnesota Vikings ====
Week 9: Minnesota Vikings at Atlanta Falcons – Game summary

Quarter	1	2	3	4	Total
**Vikings**	3	7	11	10	**31**
Falcons	3	8	10	7	**28**

at Mercedes-Benz Stadium, Atlanta, Georgia

- Date: November 5
- Game time: 1:00 p.m. EST
- Game weather: Clear, 70 °F (21 °C) (retractable roof open)
- Game attendance: 69,715
- Referee: Shawn Smith
- TV announcers (Fox): Chris Myers, Mark Schlereth and Kristina Pink
- Recap, Game Book

Game information

**First quarter**

- ATL – Younghoe Koo 52-yard field goal, 7:06. Falcons 3–0. **Drive: 5 plays, 34 yards, 1:53.**
- MIN – Greg Joseph 19-yard field goal, 2:20. Tied 3–3. **Drive: 9 plays, 74 yards, 4:46.**

**Second quarter**

- ATL – Joshua Dobbs sacked in the end zone by Calais Campbell for a safety, 14:04. Falcons 5–3.
- ATL – Younghoe Koo 43-yard field goal, 8:57. Falcons 8–3. **Drive: 10 plays, 38 yards, 5:07.**
- ATL – Younghoe Koo 23-yard field goal, 5:32. Falcons 11–3. **Drive: 4 plays, −4 yards, 2:01.**
- MIN – Alexander Mattison 2-yard pass from Joshua Dobbs (Greg Joseph kick), 0:55. Falcons 11–10. **Drive: 13 plays, 75 yards, 4:37.**

**Third quarter**

- ATL – Younghoe Koo 54-yard field goal, 12:15. Falcons 14–10. **Drive: 4 plays, −6 yards, 1:32.**
- MIN – Greg Joseph 32-yard field goal, 8:13. Falcons 14–13. **Drive: 8 plays, 61 yards, 4:02.**
- ATL – Jonnu Smith 60-yard pass from Taylor Heinicke (Younghoe Koo kick), 6:54. Falcons 21–13. **Drive: 4 plays, 75 yards, 1:19.**
- MIN – Joshua Dobbs 18-yard run (Joshua Dobbs–Trishton Jackson pass), 2:20. Tied 21–21. **Drive: 6 plays, 40 yards, 2:34.**

**Fourth quarter**

- MIN – Greg Joseph 31-yard field goal, 14:18. Vikings 24–21. **Drive: 5 plays, 11 yards, 2:54.**
- ATL – Tyler Allgeier 5-yard run (Younghoe Koo kick), 2:08. Falcons 28–24. **Drive: 13 plays, 79 yards, 6:58.**
- MIN – Brandon Powell 6-yard pass from Joshua Dobbs (Greg Joseph kick), 0:22. Vikings 31–28. **Drive: 11 plays, 75 yards, 1:46.**

**Top passers**

- MIN – Joshua Dobbs – 20/30, 158 yards, 2 TD
- ATL – Taylor Heinicke – 21/38, 268 yards, TD, INT

**Top rushers**

- MIN – Joshua Dobbs – 7 rushes, 66 yards, TD
- ATL – Bijan Robinson – 11 rushes, 51 yards

**Top receivers**

- MIN – T. J. Hockenson – 7 receptions, 69 yards
- ATL – Jonnu Smith – 5 receptions, 100 yards, TD

The Falcons weren't able to hold off the Vikings, losing to them 31–28, allowing their rival Saints to defeat the Bears and take the number 1 spot in the NFC South.

==== Week 10: at Arizona Cardinals ====
Week 10: Atlanta Falcons at Arizona Cardinals – Game summary

Quarter	1	2	3	4	Total
Falcons	0	14	3	6	**23**
**Cardinals**	3	9	10	3	**25**

at State Farm Stadium, Glendale, Arizona

- Date: November 12
- Game time: 4:05 p.m. EST/2:05 p.m. MST
- Game weather: None (retractable roof closed)
- Game attendance: 62,861
- Referee: Craig Wrolstad
- TV announcers (CBS): Spero Dedes, Adam Archuleta and Amanda Balionis
- Recap, Game Book

Game information

**First quarter**

- ARI – Matt Prater 51-yard field goal, 4:48. Cardinals 3–0. **Drive: 15 plays, 63 yards, 7:48.**

**Second quarter**

- ATL – Scotty Miller 2-yard pass from Taylor Heinicke (Younghoe Koo kick), 13:27. Falcons 7–3. **Drive: 12 plays, 75 yards, 6:21.**
- ARI – Matt Prater 46-yard field goal, 10:32. Falcons 7–6. **Drive: 6 plays, 47 yards, 2:55.**
- ATL – Bijan Robinson 5-yard run (Younghoe Koo kick), 4:07. Falcons 14–6. **Drive: 13 plays, 75 yards, 6:25.**
- ARI – Kyler Murray 6-yard run (pass failed), 0:10. Falcons 14–12. **Drive: 9 plays, 75 yards, 3:57.**

**Third quarter**

- ARI – Matt Prater 56-yard field goal, 9:16. Cardinals 15–14. **Drive: 9 plays, 38 yards, 4:49.**
- ATL – Younghoe Koo 36-yard field goal, 5:18. Falcons 17–15. **Drive: 4 plays, 3 yards, 1:17.**
- ARI – Clayton Tune 1-yard run (Matt Prater kick), 0:19. Cardinals 22–17. **Drive: 3 plays, 21 yards, 0:49.**

**Fourth quarter**

- ATL – Desmond Ridder 9-yard run (pass failed), 2:33. Falcons 23–22. **Drive: 8 plays, 74 yards, 3:10.**
- ARI – Matt Prater 23-yard field goal, 0:00. Cardinals 25–23. **Drive: 11 plays, 70 yards, 2:33.**

**Top passers**

- ATL – Taylor Heinicke – 8/15, 55 yards, TD
- ARI – Kyler Murray – 19/32, 249 yards, INT

**Top rushers**

- ATL – Bijan Robinson – 22 rushes, 95 yards, TD
- ARI – James Conner – 16 rushes, 73 yards

**Top receivers**

- ATL – Drake London – 3 receptions, 36 yards
- ARI – Trey McBride – 8 receptions, 131 yards

==== Week 12: vs. New Orleans Saints ====
Week 12: New Orleans Saints at Atlanta Falcons – Game summary

Quarter	1	2	3	4	Total
Saints	3	6	3	3	**15**
**Falcons**	7	7	0	10	**24**

at Mercedes-Benz Stadium, Atlanta, Georgia

- Date: November 26
- Game time: 1:00 p.m. EST
- Game weather: None (retractable roof closed)
- Game attendance: 70,166
- Referee: Brad Allen
- TV announcers (Fox): Joe Davis, Daryl Johnston and Pam Oliver
- Recap, Game Book

Game information

**First quarter**

- NO – Blake Grupe 25-yard field goal, 8:10. Saints 3–0. **Drive: 10 plays, 77 yards, 3:58.**
- ATL – Jessie Bates 92-yard interception return (Younghoe Koo kick), 1:46. Falcons 7–3.

**Second quarter**

- NO – Blake Grupe 52-yard field goal, 14:16. Falcons 7–6. **Drive: 7 plays, 41 yards, 2:30.**
- ATL – Bijan Robinson 10-yard run (Younghoe Koo kick), 8:56. Falcons 14–6. **Drive: 10 plays, 78 yards, 5:20.**
- NO – Blake Grupe 41-yard field goal, 3:54. Falcons 14–9. **Drive: 12 plays, 52 yards, 5:02.**

**Third quarter**

- NO – Blake Grupe 45-yard field goal, 3:27. Falcons 14–12. **Drive: 14 plays, 65 yards, 8:13.**
- ATL – Bijan Robinson 26-yard pass from Desmond Ridder (Younghoe Koo kick), 9:57. Falcons 21–12. **Drive: 9 plays, 95 yards, 5:03.**

**Fourth quarter**

- NO – Blake Grupe 39-yard field goal, 6:24. Falcons 21–15. **Drive: 8 plays, 54 yards, 3:33.**
- ATL – Younghoe Koo 39-yard field goal, 1:47. Falcons 24–15. **Drive: 10 plays, 54 yards, 4:37.**

**Top passers**

- NO – Derek Carr – 24/38, 304 yards, INT
- ATL – Desmond Ridder – 13/21, 168 yards, TD, 2 INT

**Top rushers**

- NO – Alvin Kamara – 15 rushes, 69 yards
- ATL – Bijan Robinson – 16 rushes, 91 yards, TD

**Top receivers**

- NO – Chris Olave – 7 receptions, 114 yards
- ATL – Drake London – 5 receptions, 91 yards

==== Week 13: at New York Jets ====
Week 13: Atlanta Falcons at New York Jets – Game summary

Quarter	1	2	3	4	Total
**Falcons**	0	10	3	0	**13**
Jets	2	3	3	0	**8**

at MetLife Stadium, East Rutherford, New Jersey

- Date: December 3
- Game time: 1:00 p.m. EST
- Game weather: Cloudy, 50 °F (10 °C)
- Game attendance: 74,455
- Referee: Ronald Torbert
- TV announcers (Fox): Kenny Albert, Jonathan Vilma and Shannon Spake
- Recap, Game Book

Game information

**First quarter**

- NYJ – Bijan Robinson tackled in end zone for a safety, 1:36. Jets 2–0.

**Second quarter**

- ATL – MyCole Pruitt 20-yard pass from Desmond Ridder (Younghoe Koo kick), 10:04. Falcons 7–2. **Drive: 6 plays, 47 yards, 3:07.**
- NYJ – Greg Zuerlein 27-yard field goal, 3:56. Falcons 7–5. **Drive: 12 plays, 66 yards, 6:08.**
- ATL – Younghoe Koo 22-yard field goal, 0:00. Falcons 10–5. **Drive: 7 plays, 40 yards, 1:13.**

**Third quarter**

- NYJ – Greg Zuerlein 466-yard field goal, 10:32. Falcons 10–8. **Drive: 9 plays, 47 yards, 4:28.**
- ATL – Younghoe Koo 42-yard field goal, 3:38. Falcons 13–8. **Drive: 14 plays, 51 yards, 6:54.**

**Fourth quarter**

- No scoring plays.

**Top passers**

- ATL – Desmond Ridder – 12/27, 121 yards, TD
- NYJ – Tim Boyle – 14/25, 148 yards, INT

**Top rushers**

- ATL – Bijan Robinson – 18 rushes, 53 yards
- NYJ – Dalvin Cook – 9 rushes, 35 yards

**Top receivers**

- ATL – Kyle Pitts – 4 receptions, 51 yards
- NYJ – Breece Hall – 6 receptions, 29 yards

==== Week 14: vs. Tampa Bay Buccaneers ====
Week 14: Tampa Bay Buccaneers at Atlanta Falcons – Game summary

Quarter	1	2	3	4	Total
**Buccaneers**	3	9	7	10	**29**
Falcons	3	7	0	15	**25**

at Mercedes-Benz Stadium, Atlanta, Georgia

- Date: December 10
- Game time: 1:00 p.m. EST
- Game weather: None (retractable roof closed)
- Game attendance: 69,496
- Referee: Alex Kemp
- TV announcers (CBS): Spero Dedes, Adam Archuleta and Aditi Kinkhabwala
- Recap, Game Book

Game information

**First quarter**

- TB – Chase McLaughlin 55-yard field goal, 9:27. Buccaneers 3–0. **Drive: 9 plays, 38 yards, 5:33.**
- ATL – Younghoe Koo 20-yard field goal, 1:23. Tied 3–3. **Drive: 16 plays, 73 yards, 8:04.**

**Second quarter**

- TB – Baker Mayfield 1-yard run (Chase McLaughlin kick), 14:57. Buccaneers 10–3. **Drive: 2 plays, 8 yards, 0:23.**
- ATL – Kyle Pitts 36-yard pass from Desmond Ridder (Younghoe Koo kick), 12:09. Tied 10–10. **Drive: 6 plays, 75 yards, 2:48.**
- TB – Keith Smith tackled in end zone for a safety, 2:36. Buccaneers 12–10.

**Third quarter**

- TB – Rachaad White 31-yard pass from Baker Mayfield (Chase McLaughlin kick), 4:06. Buccaneers 19–10. **Drive: 9 plays, 66 yards, 4:40.**

**Fourth quarter**

- ATL – Bijan Robinson 3-yard run (Younghoe Koo kick), 11:10. Buccaneers 19–17. **Drive: 7 plays, 67 yards, 2:52.**
- TB – Chase McLaughlin 38-yard field goal, 6:10. Buccaneers 22–17. **Drive: 10 plays, 55 yards, 5:00.**
- ATL – Desmond Ridder 6-yard run (Desmond Ridder-Drake London pass), 3:23. Falcons 25–22. **Drive: 5 plays, 75 yards, 2:47.**
- TB – Cade Otton 11-yard pass from Baker Mayfield (Chase McLaughlin kick), 0:31. Buccaneers 29–25. **Drive: 12 plays, 75 yards, 2:52.**

**Top passers**

- TB – Baker Mayfield – 14/29, 144 yards, 2 TD
- ATL – Desmond Ridder – 26/40, 347 yards, TD, INT

**Top rushers**

- TB – Rachaad White – 25 rushes, 102 yards
- ATL – Tyler Allgeier – 9 rushes, 40 yards

**Top receivers**

- TB – Chris Godwin – 5 receptions, 53 yards
- ATL – Drake London – 10 receptions, 172 yards

==== Week 15: at Carolina Panthers ====
Week 15: Atlanta Falcons at Carolina Panthers – Game summary

Quarter	1	2	3	4	Total
Falcons	0	7	0	0	**7**
**Panthers**	0	3	0	6	**9**

at Bank of America Stadium, Charlotte, North Carolina

- Date: December 17
- Game time: 1:00 p.m. EST
- Game weather: Rain, 46 °F (8 °C)
- Game attendance: 70,301
- Referee: Land Clark
- TV announcers (Fox): Adam Amin, Mark Schlereth and Kristina Pink
- Recap, Game Book

Game information

**First quarter**

- No scoring plays.

**Second quarter**

- ATL – Cordarrelle Patterson 2-yard pass from Desmond Ridder (Younghoe Koo kick), 4:49. Falcons 7–0. **Drive: 3 plays, 63 yards, 1:17.**
- CAR – Eddy Piñeiro 34-yard field goal, 0:22. Falcons 7–3. **Drive: 12 plays, 60 yards, 4:27.**

**Third quarter**

- No scoring plays.

**Fourth quarter**

- CAR – Eddy Piñeiro 25-yard field goal, 13:32. Falcons 7–6. **Drive: 6 plays, 17 yards, 2:54.**
- CAR – Eddy Piñeiro 23-yard field goal, 0:00. Panthers 9–7. **Drive: 17 plays, 90 yards, 7:35.**

**Top passers**

- ATL – Desmond Ridder – 12/20, 152 yards, TD, INT
- CAR – Bryce Young – 18/24, 167 yards

**Top rushers**

- ATL – Tyler Allgeier – 14 rushes, 45 yards
- CAR – Chuba Hubbard – 22 rushes, 87 yards

**Top receivers**

- ATL – Kyle Pitts – 3 receptions, 37 yards
- CAR – Adam Thielen – 4 receptions, 43 yards

==== Week 16: vs. Indianapolis Colts ====
Week 16: Indianapolis Colts at Atlanta Falcons – Game summary

Quarter	1	2	3	4	Total
Colts	7	0	3	0	**10**
**Falcons**	7	6	7	9	**29**

at Mercedes-Benz Stadium, Atlanta, Georgia

- Date: December 24
- Game time: 1:00 p.m. EST
- Game weather: None (retractable roof closed)
- Game attendance: 69,221
- Referee: Alan Eck
- TV announcers (Fox): Adam Amin, Mark Schlereth and Kristina Pink
- Recap, Game Book

Game information

**First quarter**

- IND – Jonathan Taylor 1-yard run (Matt Gay kick), 9:24. Colts 7–0. **Drive: 13 plays, 75 yards, 5:36.**
- ATL – Kyle Pitts 24-yard pass from Taylor Heinicke (Younghoe Koo kick), 7:42. Tied 7–7. **Drive: 5 plays, 75 yards, 1:42.**

**Second quarter**

- ATL – Younghoe Koo 23-yard field goal, 3:23. Falcons 10–7. **Drive: 14 plays, 82 yards, 6:13.**
- ATL – Younghoe Koo 47-yard field goal, 0:05. Falcons 13–7. **Drive: 8 plays, 46 yards, 1:41.**

**Third quarter**

- ATL – Tyler Allgeier 31-yard run (Younghoe Koo kick), 11:13. Falcons 20–7. **Drive: 8 plays, 75 yards, 3:47.**
- IND – Matt Gay 33-yard field goal, 4:23. Falcons 20–10. **Drive: 12 plays, 60 yards, 6:50.**

**Fourth quarter**

- ATL – Younghoe Koo 41-yard field goal, 14:06. Falcons 23–10. **Drive: 12 plays, 52 yards, 5:17.**
- ATL – Younghoe Koo 35-yard field goal, 5:46. Falcons 26–10. **Drive: 6 plays, 33 yards, 2:11.**
- ATL – Younghoe Koo 25-yard field goal, 1:57. Falcons 29–10. **Drive: 6 plays, 11 yards, 2:52.**

**Top passers**

- IND – Gardner Minshew – 20/37, 201 yards, INT
- ATL – Taylor Heinicke – 23/33, 229 yards, TD

**Top rushers**

- IND – Jonathan Taylor – 18 rushes, 43 yards, TD
- ATL – Bijan Robinson – 12 rushes, 72 yards

**Top receivers**

- IND – Josh Downs – 6 receptions, 39 yards
- ATL – Bijan Robinson – 7 receptions, 50 yards

==== Week 17: at Chicago Bears ====
Week 17: Atlanta Falcons at Chicago Bears – Game summary

Quarter	1	2	3	4	Total
Falcons	0	7	3	7	**17**
**Bears**	7	14	6	10	**37**

at Soldier Field, Chicago, Illinois

- Date: December 31
- Game time: 1:00 p.m. EST/12:00 p.m. CST
- Game weather: Light snow, 32 °F (0 °C)
- Game attendance: 61,752
- Referee: Adrian Hill
- TV announcers (CBS): Chris Lewis, Jason McCourty, Ross Tucker and Amanda Renner
- Recap, Game Book

Game information

**First quarter**

- CHI – D. J. Moore 7-yard pass from Justin Fields (Cairo Santos kick), 8:47. Bears 7–0. **Drive: 7 plays, 60 yard, 3:33.**

**Second quarter**

- CHI – Justin Fields 9-yard run (Cairo Santos kick), 14:14. Bears 14–0. **Drive: 8 plays, 68 yard, 4:03.**
- ATL – Tyler Allgeier 75-yard pass from Taylor Heinicke (Younghoe Koo kick), 14:00. Bears 14–7. **Drive: 1 play, 75 yards, 0:14.**
- CHI – Roschon Johnson 2-yard run (Cairo Santos kick), 4:02. Bears 21–7. **Drive: 12 plays, 75 yards, 7:06.**

**Third quarter**

- CHI – Cairo Santos 22-yard field goal, 11:56. Bears 24–7. **Drive: 7 plays, 71 yards, 3:04.**
- ATL – Younghoe Koo 38-yard field goal, 8:29. Bears 24–10. **Drive: 9 plays, 56 yards, 3:27.**
- CHI – Cairo Santos 42-yard field goal, 1:10. Bears 27–10. **Drive: 6 plays, 22 yards, 2:48.**

**Fourth quarter**

- ATL – Taylor Heinicke 24-yard run (Younghoe Koo kick), 12:22. Bears 27–17. **Drive: 11 plays, 75 yards, 3:48.**
- CHI – Cairo Santos 42-yard field goal, 4:59. Bears 30–17. **Drive: 7 plays, 20 yards, 3:21.**
- CHI – Khalil Herbert 1-yard run (Cairo Santos kick), 3:39. Bears 37–17. **Drive: 3 plays, 41 yards, 0:19.**

**Top passers**

- ATL – Taylor Heinicke – 10/29, 163 yards, TD, 3 INT
- CHI – Justin Fields – 20/32, 268 yards, TD

**Top rushers**

- ATL – Bijan Robinson – 15 rushes, 75 yards
- CHI – Khalil Herbert – 18 rushes, 124 yards, TD

**Top receivers**

- ATL – Drake London – 4 receptions, 56 yards
- CHI – D. J. Moore – 9 receptions, 159 yards, TD

==== Week 18: at New Orleans Saints ====
Week 18: Atlanta Falcons at New Orleans Saints – Game summary

Quarter	1	2	3	4	Total
Falcons	14	3	0	0	**17**
**Saints**	7	10	14	17	**48**

at Caesars Superdome, New Orleans, Louisiana

- Date: January 7
- Game time: 1:00 p.m. EST/12:00 p.m. CST
- Game weather: None (indoor stadium)
- Game attendance: 70,072
- Referee: John Hussey
- TV announcers (CBS): Andrew Catalon, Tiki Barber, Matt Ryan and AJ Ross
- Recap, Game Book

Game information

**First quarter**

- ATL – Jonnu Smith 15-yard pass from Desmond Ridder (Younghoe Koo kick), 8:42. Falcons 7–0. **Drive: 7 plays, 79 yards, 3:39.**
- NO – A. T. Perry 18-yard pass from Derek Carr (Blake Grupe kick), 5:01. Tied 7–7. **Drive: 7 plays, 75 yards, 3:41.**
- ATL – Bijan Robinson 71-yard pass from Desmond Ridder (Younghoe Koo kick), 4:13. Falcons 14–7. **Drive: 2 plays, 75 yards, 0:48.**

**Second quarter**

- NO – Kendre Miller 3-yard run (Blake Grupe kick), 11:04. Tied 14–14. **Drive: 16 plays, 75 yards, 8:09.**
- NO – Blake Grupe 24-yard field goal, 0:56. Saints 17–14. **Drive: 8 plays, 32 yards, 1:32.**
- ATL – Younghoe Koo 30-yard field goal, 0:00. Tied 17–17. **Drive: 10 plays, 63 yards, 0:56.**

**Third quarter**

- NO – Chris Olave 26-yard pass from Derek Carr (Blake Grupe kick), 13:01. Saints 24–17. **Drive: 2 plays, 25 yards, 0:35.**
- NO – Rashid Shaheed 39-yard pass from Derek Carr (Blake Grupe kick), 8:54. Saints 31–17. **Drive: 5 plays, 80 yards, 2:41.**

**Fourth quarter**

- NO – Blake Grupe 24-yard field goal, 9:57. Saints 34–17. **Drive: 12 plays, 92 yards, 6:17.**
- NO – A. T. Perry 6-yard pass from Derek Carr (Blake Grupe kick), 9:02. Saints 41–17. **Drive: 1 play, 10 yards, 0:07.**
- NO – Jamaal Williams 1-yard run (Blake Grupe kick), 1:10. Saints 48–17. **Drive: 1 play, 1 yard, 0:03.**

**Top passers**

- ATL – Desmond Ridder – 22/30, 291 yards, 2 TD, INT
- NO – Derek Carr – 22/28, 264 yards, 4 TD

**Top rushers**

- ATL – Bijan Robinson – 11 rushes, 28 yards
- NO – Kendre Miller – 13 rushes, 71 yards, TD

**Top receivers**

- ATL – Bijan Robinson – 7 receptions, 103 yards, TD
- NO – Taysom Hill – 4 receptions, 28 yards

=== Standings ===
==== Division ====
NFC South
	W	L	T	PCT	DIV	CONF	PF	PA	STK
^{(4)} Tampa Bay Buccaneers	9	8	0	.529	4–2	7–5	348	325	W1
New Orleans Saints	9	8	0	.529	4–2	6–6	402	327	W2
Atlanta Falcons	7	10	0	.412	3–3	4–8	321	373	L2
Carolina Panthers	2	15	0	.118	1–5	1–11	236	416	L3

==== Conference ====
NFC
#	Team	Division	W	L	T	PCT	DIV	CONF	SOS	SOV	STK
**Division leaders**
1 (Note: San Francisco finished ahead of Dallas and Detroit based on conference record, claiming the No. 1 seed.)	San Francisco 49ers	West	12	5	0	.706	5–1	10–2	.509	.475	L1
2 (Note: Dallas claimed the No. 2 seed over Detroit based on head-to-head victory.)	Dallas Cowboys	East	12	5	0	.706	5–1	9–3	.446	.392	W2
3	Detroit Lions	North	12	5	0	.706	4–2	8–4	.481	.436	W1
4 (Note: Tampa Bay finished ahead of New Orleans in the NFC South based on common record. (Tampa Bay is 8–4 against Minnesota, Chicago, Detroit, Green Bay, Atlanta, Carolina, Houston, Tennessee, Jacksonville, and Indianapolis, while New Orleans is 6–6 against the same teams.))	Tampa Bay Buccaneers	South	9	8	0	.529	4–2	7–5	.481	.379	W1
**Wild cards**
5	Philadelphia Eagles	East	11	6	0	.647	4–2	7–5	.481	.476	L2
6	Los Angeles Rams	West	10	7	0	.588	5–1	8–4	.529	.453	W4
7 (Note: Green Bay and Seattle finished ahead of New Orleans based on conference record.) (Note: Green Bay finished ahead of Seattle based on strength of victory, claiming the 7th and final playoff spot.)	Green Bay Packers	North	9	8	0	.529	4–2	7–5	.474	.458	W3
**Did not qualify for the postseason**
8	Seattle Seahawks	West	9	8	0	.529	2–4	7–5	.512	.392	W1
9	New Orleans Saints	South	9	8	0	.529	4–2	6–6	.433	.340	W2
10 (Note: Minnesota finished ahead of Atlanta based on head-to-head victory. Division tie break was initially used to eliminate Chicago (see below).) (Note: Minnesota finished ahead of Chicago based on common record. (Minnesota is 5–7 against Tampa Bay, Los Angeles Chargers, Carolina, Kansas City, Green Bay, Atlanta, New Orleans, Denver, Las Vegas, and Detroit, while Chicago is 4–8 against the same teams.))	Minnesota Vikings	North	7	10	0	.412	2–4	6–6	.509	.454	L4
11 (Note: Chicago finished ahead of Atlanta based on head-to-head victory.)	Chicago Bears	North	7	10	0	.412	2–4	6–6	.464	.370	L1
12	Atlanta Falcons	South	7	10	0	.412	3–3	4–8	.429	.462	L2
13	New York Giants	East	6	11	0	.353	3–3	5–7	.512	.353	W1
14 (Note: Washington finished ahead of Arizona based on head-to-head victory.)	Washington Commanders	East	4	13	0	.235	0–6	2–10	.512	.338	L8
15	Arizona Cardinals	West	4	13	0	.235	0–6	3–9	.561	.588	L1
16	Carolina Panthers	South	2	15	0	.118	1–5	1–11	.522	.500	L3
**Tiebreakers** (Note: When breaking ties for three or more teams under the NFL's rules, they are first broken within divisions, then comparing only the highest-ranked remaining team from each division.)

=== Team leaders ===
Category	Player(s)	Value
Passing yards	Desmond Ridder	2,836
Passing touchdowns	Desmond Ridder	12
Rushing yards	Bijan Robinson	976
Rushing touchdowns	Desmond Ridder	5
Receptions	Drake London	69
Receiving yards	Drake London	905
Receiving touchdowns	Bijan Robinson	4
Points	Younghoe Koo	123
Kickoff return yards	Cordarrelle Patterson	153
Punt return yards	Mike Hughes	67
Tackles	Jessie Bates	132
Sacks	Calais Campbell; Bud Dupree	6.5
Forced fumbles	Jessie Bates	3
Interceptions	Jessie Bates	6
Pass deflections	A. J. Terrell; Jessie Bates	10

=== NFL rankings ===
Category	Total points	Points per game	NFL rank (out of 32)
**Offensive points scored**	321	18.9	26th
**Defensive points allowed**	373	21.9	17th
