= 2023 New Orleans Saints season =

57th season in franchise history

- Owner: Gayle Benson
- General manager: Mickey Loomis
- Head coach: Dennis Allen
- Home stadium: Caesars Superdome

Results
- Record: 9–8
- Division place: 2nd NFC South
- Playoffs: Did not qualify
- All-Pros: RS Rashid Shaheed (1st team); LB Demario Davis (2nd team)
- Pro Bowlers: RS Rashid Shaheed; LB Demario Davis; C Erik McCoy

Uniform
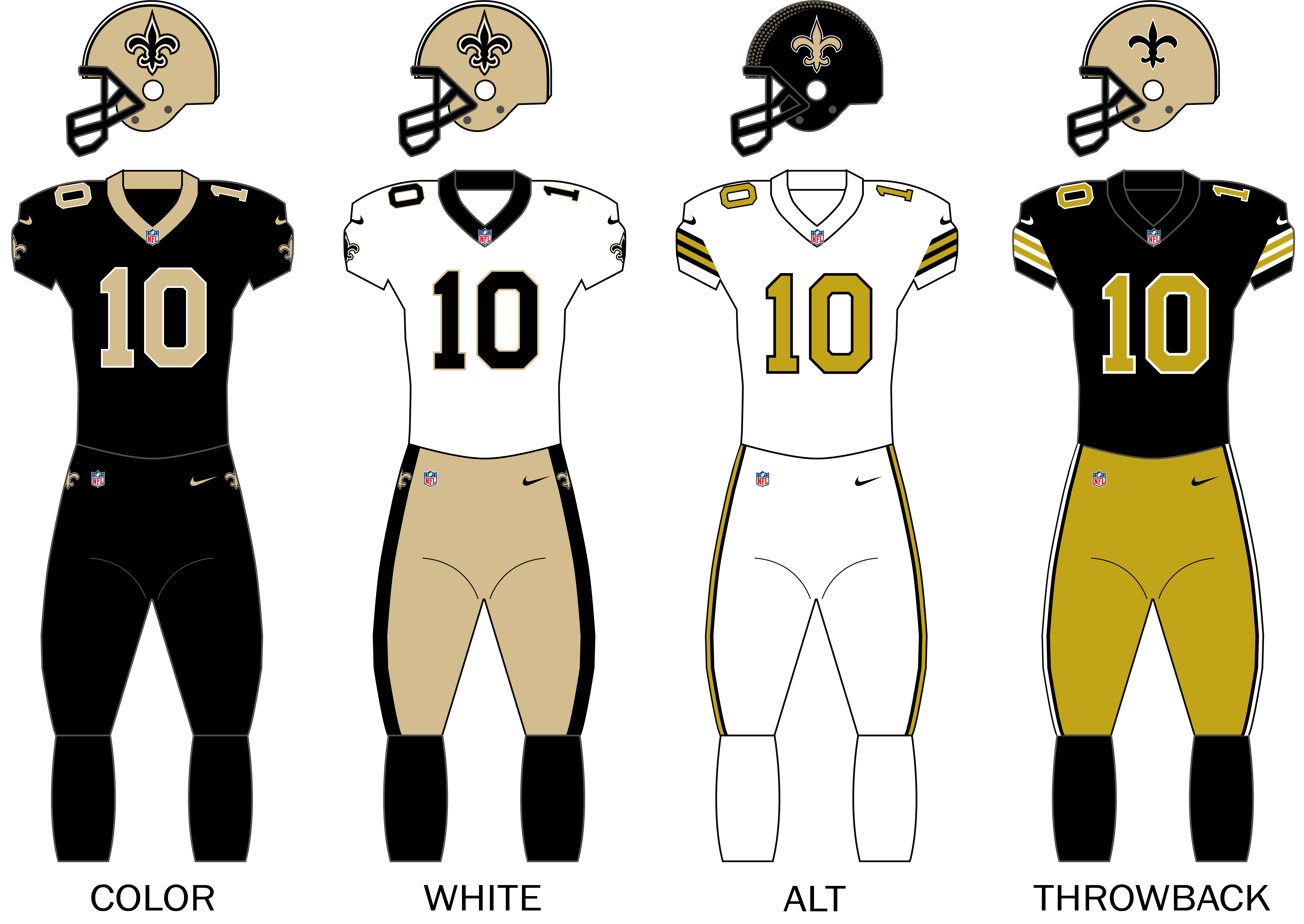

The 2023 season was the New Orleans Saints' 57th season in the National Football League (NFL), the 48th to host games at the Caesars Superdome and the second and final full season under head coach Dennis Allen, as he would be fired during their next season. The team improved on their 7–10 record from 2022, but missed the playoffs for a third consecutive season. The Saints finished tied with the Tampa Bay Buccaneers for the NFC South division title, as well as in a three-way tie with the Green Bay Packers and Seattle Seahawks for the last Wild Card spot; however, the Saints lost both tiebreakers.

The New Orleans Saints drew an average home attendance of 70,020 in 8 home games in the 2023 NFL season.

== Draft ==
2023 New Orleans Saints draft selections
Round	Selection	Player	Position	College	Notes
1	10	Traded to the Philadelphia Eagles (Note: The Saints traded a first-round selection (10th overall), a 2024 second-round selection, and 2022 first-, third- and seventh-round selections to the Philadelphia Eagles in exchange for two 2022 first-round selections and a 2022 sixth-round selection.)			
1	29	Bryan Bresee	DT	Clemson	From 49ers via Dolphins and Broncos (Note: The Saints traded a 2024 third-round selection and the coaching rights to head coach Sean Payton to the Denver Broncos in exchange for a first-round selection (29th overall) and a 2024 second-round selection.)
2	40	Isaiah Foskey	DE	Notre Dame	
3	71	Kendre Miller	RB	TCU	
4	103	Nick Saldiveri	OT	Old Dominion	From Bears (Note: The Saints traded fourth- and fifth-round selections (115th and 165th overall) to the Chicago Bears in exchange for a fourth-round selection (103rd overall).)
4	115	Traded to the Chicago Bears			
4	127	Jake Haener	QB	Fresno State	From Jaguars (Note: The Saints traded a seventh-round selection (227th overall) and a 2024 fourth-round selection to the Jacksonville Jaguars traded a fourth-round selection (127th overall).)
5	146	Jordan Howden	S	Minnesota	
5	165	Traded to the Chicago Bears			From Eagles (Note: The Saints traded a 2025 seventh-round selection and S C. J. Gardner-Johnson to the Philadelphia Eagles in exchange for a fifth-round selection (165th overall) and a 2024 sixth-round selection.)
6	188	Traded to the Houston Texans (Note: The Saints traded a sixth-round selection (188th overall) and a 2022 third-round selection (80th overall) to the Houston Texans in exchange for CB Bradley Roby.)			
6	195	A. T. Perry	WR	Wake Forest	From Steelers via Broncos (Note: The Saints traded a seventh-round selection (257th overall) and TE Adam Trautman to the Denver Broncos in exchange for a sixth-round selection (195th overall).)
7	227	Traded to the Jacksonville Jaguars			
7	257	Traded to the Denver Broncos			

2023 New Orleans Saints undrafted free agents
Name	Position	College	Ref.
Nick Anderson	LB	Tulane	
Sy Barnett	WR	Davenport	
Jerron Cage	DT	Ohio State	
Shaquan Davis	WR	South Carolina State	
Mark Evans II	OT	Arkansas–Pine Bluff	
Malik Flowers	WR, RS	Montana	
Blake Grupe	K	Notre Dame	
Lou Hedley	P	Miami (FL)	
Anthony Johnson	S	Virginia	
Anfernee Orji	LB	Vanderbilt	
Alex Pihlstrom	C	Illinois	
SaRodorick Thompson Jr.	RB	Texas Tech	
Joel Wilson	TE	Central Michigan	

Draft trades

== Staff ==
2023 New Orleans Saints staff
Front office: Owner – Gayle Benson; President – Dennis Lauscha; Executive vice president/general manager – Mickey Loomis; Senior vice president/chief operating officer – Ben Hales; Asst. general manager/college scouting director – Jeff Ireland; Asst. general manager & vice president of football administration – Khai Harley; Director of operations – James Nagaoka; Director of pro scouting – Justin Matthews; Director of pro personnel – Michael Parenton; Head coaches: Head coach – Dennis Allen; Offensive coaches: Offensive coordinator – Pete Carmichael; Passing game coordinator/quarterbacks – Ronald Curry; Running backs – Joel Thomas; Wide receivers – Kodi Burns; Tight ends – Clancy Barone; Offensive line – Doug Marrone; Offensive line assistant – Kevin Carberry; Senior offensive assistant – Bob Bicknell; Offensive assistant – Jahri Evans; Offensive assistant – Kevin Petry; Offensive assistant – Jordan Traylor; Offensive assistant – D. J. Williams; Assistant to the head coach – Mike Martinez	Defensive coaches: Defensive coordinator – Joe Woods; Defensive line – Todd Grantham; Linebackers – Michael Hodges; Secondary – Marcus Robertson; Senior defensive assistant – Peter Giunta; Defensive assistant – Adam Gristick; Pass rush specialist – Brian Young; Special teams coaches: Special teams coordinator – Darren Rizzi; Assistant special teams – Phil Galiano; Strength and conditioning: Director of sports science – Matt Rhea; Strength and conditioning coach – Matt Clapp; Assistant strength and conditioning – Charles Byrd; Assistant strength and conditioning – Rob Wenning

== Final roster ==
2023 New Orleans Saints roster
Quarterbacks (QB): 4 Derek Carr; 7 Taysom Hill; 3 Jake Haener; 2 Jameis Winston; Running backs (RB): 41 Alvin Kamara; 25 Kendre Miller; 46 Adam Prentice FB; 21 Jamaal Williams; Wide receivers (WR): 5 Lynn Bowden; 18 Keith Kirkwood; 12 Chris Olave; 17 A. T. Perry; 22 Rashid Shaheed; Tight ends (TE): 80 Jimmy Graham; 83 Juwan Johnson; 87 Foster Moreau	Offensive linemen (OL): 77 Cameron Erving T; 73 Max Garcia C; 74 James Hurst G; 78 Erik McCoy C; 75 Andrus Peat G; 70 Trevor Penning T; 51 Cesar Ruiz G; 67 Landon Young T; Defensive linemen (DL): 90 Bryan Bresee DT; 55 Isaiah Foskey DE; 96 Carl Granderson DE; 94 Cameron Jordan DE; 92 Tanoh Kpassagnon DE; 54 P. J. Mustipher DT; 91 Kyle Phillips DE; 99 Khalen Saunders DT; 93 Nathan Shepherd DT; 98 Payton Turner DE	Linebackers (LB): 53 Zack Baun OLB; 56 Demario Davis MLB; 52 D'Marco Jackson MLB; 59 Monty Rice OLB; 42 Ty Summers OLB; 20 Pete Werner OLB; Defensive backs (DB): 24 Johnathan Abram SS; 29 Paulson Adebo CB; 0 Ugo Amadi FS; 48 J. T. Gray SS; 31 Jordan Howden SS; 38 Shemar Jean-Charles CB; 28 Lonnie Johnson Jr. FS; 32 Tyrann Mathieu FS; 1 Alontae Taylor CB; 27 Isaac Yiadom CB; Special teams (ST): 19 Blake Grupe K; 39 Lou Hedley P; 49 Zach Wood LS	Practice squad: 10 Marquez Callaway WR; 43 Ryan Connelly OLB (PS/I); 88 Shaquan Davis WR; 68 Mark Evans II T; 66 Colby Gossett G; 95 Jack Heflin DT; 30 Faion Hicks CB; 89 Tommy Hudson TE; 86 Michael Jacobson TE; 62 Tommy Kraemer G; 57 Niko Lalos DE; 37 Jordan Mims RB; 58 Anfernee Orji OLB; 76 John Penisini DT; 26 James Robinson RB; Reserve: 26 Eno Benjamin RB (IR); 50 Andrew Dowell OLB (IR); 23 Marshon Lattimore CB (IR); 6 Marcus Maye SS (IR); 71 Ryan Ramczyk T (IR); 97 Malcolm Roach DT (IR); 64 Nick Saldiveri G (IR); 45 Nephi Sewell OLB (IR); 13 Michael Thomas WR (IR); 59 Trai Turner G (IR); Rookies in italics 53 active, 10 reserve, 14 practice squad (1 exempt)

== Preseason ==
The Saints' preseason opponents and schedule were announced in the spring.

Week	Date	Opponent	Result	Record	Venue	Recap
1	August 13	Kansas City Chiefs	W 26–24	1–0	Caesars Superdome	Recap
2	August 20	at Los Angeles Chargers	W 22–17	2–0	SoFi Stadium	Recap
3	August 27	Houston Texans	L 13–17	2–1	Caesars Superdome	Recap

== Regular season ==
=== Schedule ===
Week	Date	Opponent	Result	Record	Venue	Recap
1	September 10	Tennessee Titans	**W** 16–15	1–0	Caesars Superdome	Recap
2	September 18	at **Carolina Panthers**	**W** 20–17	2–0	Bank of America Stadium	Recap
3	September 24	at Green Bay Packers	**L** 17–18	2–1	Lambeau Field	Recap
4	October 1	**Tampa Bay Buccaneers**	**L** 9–26	2–2	Caesars Superdome	Recap
5	October 8	at New England Patriots	**W** 34–0	3–2	Gillette Stadium	Recap
6	October 15	at Houston Texans	**L** 13–20	3–3	NRG Stadium	Recap
7	October 19	Jacksonville Jaguars	**L** 24–31	3–4	Caesars Superdome	Recap
8	October 29	at Indianapolis Colts	**W** 38–27	4–4	Lucas Oil Stadium	Recap
9	November 5	Chicago Bears	**W** 24–17	5–4	Caesars Superdome	Recap
10	November 12	at Minnesota Vikings	**L** 19–27	5–5	U.S. Bank Stadium	Recap
11	Bye					
12	November 26	at **Atlanta Falcons**	**L** 15–24	5–6	Mercedes-Benz Stadium	Recap
13	December 3	Detroit Lions	**L** 28–33	5–7	Caesars Superdome	Recap
14	December 10	**Carolina Panthers**	**W** 28–6	6–7	Caesars Superdome	Recap
15	December 17	New York Giants	**W** 24–6	7–7	Caesars Superdome	Recap
16	December 21	at Los Angeles Rams	**L** 22–30	7–8	SoFi Stadium	Recap
17	December 31	at **Tampa Bay Buccaneers**	**W** 23–13	8–8	Raymond James Stadium	Recap
18	January 7	**Atlanta Falcons**	**W** 48–17	9–8	Caesars Superdome	Recap

Note: Intra-division opponents are in bold text.

=== Game summaries ===
==== Week 1: vs. Tennessee Titans ====
Week 1: Tennessee Titans at New Orleans Saints – Game summary

Quarter	1	2	3	4	Total
Titans	6	3	0	6	**15**
**Saints**	3	3	10	0	**16**

at Caesars Superdome, New Orleans, Louisiana

- Date: September 10
- Game time: 12:00 p.m. CDT
- Game weather: None (indoor stadium)
- Game attendance: 70,024
- Referee: Ronald Torbert
- TV announcers (CBS): Chris Lewis, Jason McCourty, Ross Tucker and Amanda Guerra
- Recap, Game Book

Game information

**First quarter**

- TEN – Nick Folk 50-yard field goal, 13:40. Titans 3–0. **Drive: 4 plays, 8 yards, 1:16.**
- NO – Blake Grupe 26-yard field goal, 10:18. Tied 3–3. **Drive: 9 plays, 67 yards, 3:22.**
- TEN – Nick Folk 27-yard field goal, 3:07. Titans 6–3. **Drive: 11 plays, 66 yards, 7:11.**

**Second quarter**

- NO – Blake Grupe 33-yard field goal, 7:37. Tied 6–6. **Drive: 7 plays, 14 yards, 2:17.**
- TEN – Nick Folk 31-yard field goal, 1:40. Titans 9–6. **Drive: 7 plays, 57 yards, 2:49.**

**Third quarter**

- NO – Blake Grupe 52-yard field goal, 9:25. Tied 9–9. **Drive: 7 plays, 60 yards, 3:30.**
- NO – Rashid Shaheed 19-yard pass from Derek Carr (Blake Grupe kick), 1:23. Saints 16–9. **Drive: 5 plays, 33 yards, 1:45.**

**Fourth quarter**

- TEN – Nick Folk 45-yard field goal, 11:12. Saints 16–12. **Drive: 12 plays, 48 yards, 5:11.**
- TEN – Nick Folk 29-yard field goal, 2:17. Saints 16–15. **Drive: 9 plays, 62 yards, 4:25.**

**Top passers**

- TEN – Ryan Tannehill – 16/34, 198 yards, 3 INT
- NO – Derek Carr – 23/33, 305 yards, TD, INT

**Top rushers**

- TEN – Derrick Henry – 15 rushes, 63 yards
- NO – Jamaal Williams – 18 rushes, 45 yards

**Top receivers**

- TEN – DeAndre Hopkins – 7 receptions, 65 yards
- NO – Chris Olave – 8 receptions, 112 yards

In the Saints home opener against the Tennessee Titans, they barely held on with a 16–15 win. They start off the season 1–0.

==== Week 2: at Carolina Panthers ====
Week 2: New Orleans Saints at Carolina Panthers – Game summary

Quarter	1	2	3	4	Total
**Saints**	3	3	7	7	**20**
Panthers	3	0	3	11	**17**

at Bank of America Stadium, Charlotte, North Carolina

- Date: September 18
- Game time: 7:15 p.m. EDT/6:15 p.m. CDT
- Game weather: Partly cloudy, 81 °F (27 °C)
- Game attendance: 72,709
- Referee: Scott Novak
- TV announcers (WDSU/ESPN): Chris Fowler, Louis Riddick, Dan Orlovsky and Laura Rutledge
- Recap, Game Book

Game information

**First quarter**

- CAR – Eddy Piñeiro 52-yard field goal, 7:04. Panthers 3–0. **Drive: 9 plays, 31 yards, 4:53.**
- NO – Blake Grupe 28-yard field goal, 0:36. Tied 3–3. **Drive: 15 plays, 65 yards, 6:28.**

**Second quarter**

- NO – Blake Grupe 23-yard field goal, 9:52. Saints 6–3. **Drive: 12 plays, 51 yards, 4:23.**

**Third quarter**

- CAR – Eddy Piñeiro 54-yard field goal, 9:09. Tied 6–6. **Drive: 4 plays, 5 yards, 1:16.**
- NO – Tony Jones Jr. 2-yard rush (Blake Grupe kick), 2:56. Saints 13–6. **Drive: 10 plays, 75 yards, 6:14.**

**Fourth quarter**

- CAR – Eddy Piñeiro 36-yard field goal, 5:30. Saints 13–9. **Drive: 11 plays, 62 yards, 7:17.**
- NO – Tony Jones Jr. 2-yard rush (Blake Grupe kick), 3:14. Saints 20–9. **Drive: 6 plays, 79 yards, 2:16.**
- CAR – Adam Thielen 2-yard pass from Bryce Young (Bryce Young–Adam Thielen pass), 3:14. Saints 20–17. **Drive: 11 plays, 75 yards, 1:58.**

**Top passers**

- NO – Derek Carr – 21/36, 228 yards, INT
- CAR – Bryce Young – 22/33, 153 yards, TD

**Top rushers**

- NO – Taysom Hill – 9 rushes, 75 yards
- CAR – Miles Sanders – 14 rushes, 43 yards

**Top receivers**

- NO – Chris Olave – 6 receptions, 86 yards
- CAR – Adam Thielen – 7 receptions, 54 yards, TD

With the win, the Saints started 2–0 for the first time since 2013.

==== Week 3: at Green Bay Packers ====
Week 3: New Orleans Saints at Green Bay Packers – Game summary

Quarter	1	2	3	4	Total
Saints	7	10	0	0	**17**
**Packers**	0	0	0	18	**18**

at Lambeau Field, Green Bay, Wisconsin

- Date: September 24
- Game time: 12:00 p.m. CDT
- Game weather: Cloudy, 68 °F (20 °C)
- Game attendance: 78,043
- Referee: Brad Rogers
- TV announcers (Fox): Kenny Albert, Jonathan Vilma and Shannon Spake
- Recap, Game Book

Game information

**First quarter**

- NO – Jimmy Graham 8-yard pass from Derek Carr (Blake Grupe kick), 6:40. Saints 7–0. **Drive: 9 plays, 56 yards, 4:04.**

**Second quarter**

- NO – Rashid Shaheed 76-punt return (Blake Grupe kick), 10:30. Saints 14–0.
- NO – Blake Grupe 25-yard field goal, 0:06. Saints 17–0. **Drive: 14 plays, 82 yards, 4:24.**

**Third quarter** No scoring plays. **Fourth quarter**

- GB – Anders Carlson 38-yard field goal, 11:00. Saints 17–3. **Drive: 7 plays, 46 yards, 1:50.**
- GB – Jordan Love 1-yard run (Samori Toure pass from Jordan Love), 6:58. Saints 17–11. **Drive: 7 plays, 80 yards, 1:29.**
- GB – Romeo Doubs 8-yard pass from Jordan Love (Anders Carlson kick), 2:56. Packers 18–17. **Drive: 9 plays, 80 yards, 2:27.**

**Top passers**

- NO – Derek Carr – 13/18, 103 yards, TD
- GB – Jordan Love – 22/44, 259 yards, TD, INT

**Top rushers**

- NO – Kendre Miller – 9 rushes, 34 yards
- GB – Jordan Love – 9 rushes, 39 yards, TD

**Top receivers**

- NO – Chris Olave – 8 receptions, 104 yards
- GB – Luke Musgrave – 6 receptions, 49 yards

The Saints held a 17–0 lead heading into the fourth quarter before the Packers made an 18-point comeback. Green Bay secured an 18–17 victory on an 8-yard touchdown pass from Jordan Love to Romeo Doubs, followed by a missed 46-yard field goal attempt by kicker Blake Grupe that would have won the game. Quarterback Derek Carr suffered an AC joint shoulder sprain after getting sacked in the third quarter. With the loss, the Saints fell to 2–1.

==== Week 4: vs. Tampa Bay Buccaneers ====
Week 4: Tampa Bay Buccaneers at New Orleans Saints – Game summary

Quarter	1	2	3	4	Total
**Buccaneers**	0	14	0	12	**26**
Saints	3	0	3	3	**9**

at Caesars Superdome, New Orleans, Louisiana

- Date: October 1
- Game time: 12:00 p.m. CDT
- Game weather: None (indoor stadium)
- Game attendance: 70,003
- Referee: Shawn Hochuli
- TV announcers (Fox): Chris Myers, Robert Smith and Jen Hale
- Recap, Game Book

Game information

**First quarter**

- NO – Blake Grupe 37-yard field goal, 9:20. Saints 3–0. **Drive: 11 plays, 56 yards, 5:40.**

**Second quarter**

- TB – Cade Otton 4-yard pass from Baker Mayfield (Chase McLaughlin kick), 5:19. Buccaneers 7–3. **Drive: 17 plays, 87 yards, 8:51.**
- TB – Trey Palmer 1-yard pass from Baker Mayfield (Chase McLaughlin kick), 0:19. Buccaneers 14–3. **Drive: 2 plays, 6 yards, 0:10.**

**Third quarter**

- NO – Blake Grupe 32-yard field goal, 0:49. Buccaneers 14–6. **Drive: 12 plays, 57 yards, 7:09.**

**Fourth quarter**

- TB – Chase McLaughlin 51-yard field goal, 13:31. Buccaneers 17–6. **Drive: 6 plays, 42 yards, 2:18.**
- NO – Blake Grupe 44-yard field goal, 8:29. Buccaneers 17–9. **Drive: 14 plays, 49 yards, 5:02.**
- TB – Deven Thompkins 5-yard pass from Baker Mayfield (pass failed), 3:44. Buccaneers 23–9. **Drive: 10 plays, 75 yards, 4:45.**
- TB – Chase McLaughlin 28-yard field goal, 2:24. Buccaneers 26–9. **Drive: 4 plays, 9 yards, 0:58.**

**Top passers**

- TB – Baker Mayfield – 25/32, 246 yards, 3 TD, INT
- NO – Derek Carr – 23/37, 127 yards

**Top rushers**

- TB – Rachaad White – 15 rushes, 56 yards
- NO – Alvin Kamara – 11 rushes, 51 yards

**Top receivers**

- TB – Chris Godwin – 8 receptions, 114 yards
- NO – Michael Thomas – 4 receptions, 53 yards

The Saints endured their second consecutive loss, falling to 2–2. Last season, Lattimore and Evans were ejected for fighting.

==== Week 5: at New England Patriots ====
Week 5: New Orleans Saints at New England Patriots – Game summary

Quarter	1	2	3	4	Total
**Saints**	7	14	3	10	**34**
Patriots	0	0	0	0	**0**

at Gillette Stadium, Foxborough, Massachusetts

- Date: October 8
- Game time: 1:00 p.m. EDT/12:00 p.m. CDT
- Game weather: Sunny, 61 °F (16 °C)
- Game attendance: 64,628
- Referee: Alex Kemp
- TV announcers (CBS): Kevin Harlan, Trent Green and Melanie Collins
- Recap, Game Book

Game information

**First quarter**

- NO – Tyrann Mathieu 27-yard interception return (Blake Grupe kick), 7:02. Saints 7–0.

**Second quarter**

- NO – Alvin Kamara 2-yard run (Blake Grupe kick), 14:23. Saints 14–0. **Drive: 8 plays, 62 yards, 4:16.**
- NO – Chris Olave 5-yard pass from Derek Carr (Blake Grupe kick), 10:47. Saints 21–0. **Drive: 5 plays, 59 yards, 2:35.**

**Third quarter**

- NO – Blake Groupe 54-yard field goal, 11:34. Saints 24–0. **Drive: 4 plays, 6 yards, 2:26.**

**Fourth quarter**

- NO – Foster Moreau 6-yard pass from Derek Carr (Blake Grupe kick), 13:03. Saints 31–0. **Drive: 6 plays, 31 yards, 3:04.**
- NO – Blake Grupe 53-yard field goal, 5:43. Saints 34–0. **Drive: 4 plays, 2 yards, 1:32.**

**Top passers**

- NO – Derek Carr – 18/26, 183 yards, 2 TD
- NE – Mac Jones – 12/22, 110 yards, 2 INT

**Top rushers**

- NO – Alvin Kamara – 22 rushes, 80 yards, TD
- NE – Rhamondre Stevenson – 8 rushes, 24 yards

**Top receivers**

- NO – Michael Thomas – 4 receptions, 65 yards
- NE – Kendrick Bourne – 2 receptions, 43 yards

The Saints dominated the Patriots with a 34-point shutout, picking up the third win of the season. They improve to 3–2.

==== Week 6: at Houston Texans ====
Week 6: New Orleans Saints at Houston Texans – Game summary

Quarter	1	2	3	4	Total
Saints	7	3	3	0	**13**
**Texans**	7	10	3	0	**20**

at NRG Stadium, Houston, Texas

- Date: October 15
- Game time: 12:00 p.m. CDT
- Game weather: None (retractable roof closed)
- Game attendance: 71,810
- Referee: Alan Eck
- TV announcers (Fox): Brandon Gaudin, Robert Smith and Jen Hale
- Recap, Game Book

Game information

**First quarter**

- HOU – Dalton Schultz 1-yard pass from C. J. Stroud (Kaʻimi Fairbairn kick), 3:41. Texans 7–3. **Drive: 6 plays, 59 yards, 2:15.**
- NO – Rashid Shaheed 34-yard pass from Derek Carr (Blake Grupe kick), 0:13. Tied 7–7. **Drive: 9 plays, 75 yards, 3:28.**

**Second quarter**

- HOU – Kaʻimi Fairbairn 24-yard field goal, 10:28. Texans 10–7. **Drive: 11 plays, 70 yards, 4:45.**
- HOU – Robert Woods 6-yard pass from C. J. Stroud (Kaʻimi Fairbairn kick), 2:56. Texans 17–7. **Drive: 10 plays, 65 yards, 6:11.**
- NO – Blake Grupe 48-yard field goal, 0:18. Texans 17–10. **Drive: 13 plays, 46 yards, 2:38.**

**Third quarter**

- HOU – Kaʻimi Fairbairn 22-yard field goal, 7:01. Texans 20–10. **Drive: 6 plays, 46 yards, 2:09.**
- NO – Blake Grupe 45-yard field goal, 2:17. Texans 20–13. **Drive: 10 plays, 48 yards, 4:44.**

**Fourth quarter**

- No scoring plays

**Top passers**

- NO – Derek Carr – 32/50, 353 yards, TD, INT
- HOU – C. J. Stroud – 13/27, 199 yards, 2 TD, INT

**Top rushers**

- NO – Alvin Kamara – 19 rushes, 68 yards
- HOU – Devin Singletary – 12 rushes, 58 yards

**Top receivers**

- NO – Chris Olave – 7 receptions, 96 yards
- HOU – Nico Collins – 4 receptions, 80 yards

The Saints endured a loss to the Texans, thus bringing their record down to 3–3.

==== Week 7: vs. Jacksonville Jaguars ====
Week 7: Jacksonville Jaguars at New Orleans Saints – Game summary

Quarter	1	2	3	4	Total
**Jaguars**	7	10	7	7	**31**
Saints	3	3	3	15	**24**

at Caesars Superdome, New Orleans, Louisiana

- Date: October 19
- Game time: 7:15 p.m. CDT
- Game weather: None (indoor stadium)
- Game attendance: 70,009
- Referee: Land Clark
- TV announcers (WDSU/Prime Video): Al Michaels, Kirk Herbstreit and Kaylee Hartung
- Recap, Game Book

Game information

**First quarter**

- JAC – Travis Etienne 2-yard run (Brandon McManus kick), 9:44. Jaguars 7–0. **Drive: 10 plays, 75 yards, 5:16.**
- NO – Blake Grupe 23-yard field goal, 1:26. Jaguars 7–3. **Drive: 6 plays, 12 yards, 2:10.**

**Second quarter**

- JAC – Travis Etienne 17-yard run (Brandon McManus kick), 13:09. Jaguars 14–3. **Drive: 7 plays, 75 yards, 3:17.**
- NO – Blake Grupe 35-yard field goal, 1:57. Jaguars 14–6. **Drive: 8 plays, 29 yards, 3:44.**
- JAC – Brandon McManus 43-yard field goal, 0:32. Jaguars 17–6. **Drive: 10 plays, 50 yards, 1:25.**

**Third quarter**

- NO – Blake Grupe 42-yard field goal, 9:49. Jaguars 17–9. **Drive: 11 plays, 52 yards, 5:11.**
- JAC – Foyesade Oluokun 24-yard interception return (Brandon McManus kick), 6:47. Jaguars 24–9.

**Fourth quarter**

- NO – Taysom Hill 1-yard run (Blake Grupe kick), 14:21. Jaguars 24–16. **Drive: 16 plays, 75 yards, 7:26.**
- NO – Michael Thomas 15-yard pass from Derek Carr (Derek Carr–Alvin Kamara pass), 6:38. Tied 24–24. **Drive: 3 plays, 53 yards, 0:38.**
- JAC – Christian Kirk 44-yard pass from Trevor Lawrence (Brandon McManus kick), 3:08. Jaguars 31–24. **Drive: 2 plays, 46 yards, 0:37.**

**Top passers**

- JAC – Trevor Lawrence – 20/29, 204 yards, TD
- NO – Derek Carr – 33/55, 301 yards, TD, INT

**Top rushers**

- JAC – Trevor Lawrence – 8 rushes, 59 yards
- NO – Alvin Kamara – 17 rushes, 62 yards

**Top receivers**

- JAC – Christian Kirk – 6 receptions, 90 yards, TD
- NO – Alvin Kamara – 12 receptions, 91 yards

For the first time since the 2003 season, the Saints were defeated by the Jaguars. They fall to 3–4. Foster Moreau dropped the potentially game-tying touchdown on the final seconds of regulation. The Saints also recorded their first home loss to the Jaguars in franchise history.

==== Week 8: at Indianapolis Colts ====
Week 8: New Orleans Saints at Indianapolis Colts – Game summary

Quarter	1	2	3	4	Total
**Saints**	7	14	7	10	**38**
Colts	7	13	0	7	**27**

at Lucas Oil Stadium, Indianapolis, Indiana

- Date: October 29
- Game time: 1:00 p.m. EDT/12:00 p.m. CDT
- Game weather: None (retractable roof closed)
- Game attendance: 65,427
- Referee: Craig Wrolstad
- TV announcers (Fox): Kevin Kugler, Mark Sanchez and Laura Okmin
- Recap, Game Book

Game information

**First quarter**

- IND – Michael Pittman Jr. 10-yard pass from Gardner Minshew (Matt Gay kick), 6:56. Colts 7–0. **Drive: 7 plays, 81 yards, 4:19.**
- NO – Alvin Kamara 18-yard pass from Derek Carr (Blake Grupe kick), 3:44. Tied 7–7. **Drive: 7 plays, 75 yards, 3:12.**

**Second quarter**

- IND – Matt Gay 20-yard field goal, 14:49. Colts 10–7. **Drive: 9 plays, 73 yards, 3:55.**
- IND – Zack Moss 1-yard run (Matt Gay kick), 11:39. Colts 17–7. **Drive: 6 plays, 30 yards, 2:36.**
- NO – Taysom Hill 20-yard run (Blake Grupe kick), 7:28. Colts 17–14. **Drive: 8 plays, 75 yards, 4:11.**
- NO – Rashid Shaheed 58-yard pass from Derek Carr (Blake Grupe kick), 5:42. Saints 21–17. **Drive: 2 plays, 63 yards, 0:42.**
- IND – Matt Gay 42-yard field goal, 0:21. Saints 21–20. **Drive: 13 plays, 51 yards, 5:21.**

**Third quarter**

- NO – Alvin Kamara 15-yard run (Blake Grupe kick), 0:07. Saints 28–20. **Drive: 7 plays, 71 yards, 3:37.**

**Fourth quarter**

- NO – Taysom Hill 1-yard run (Blake Grupe kick), 10:49. Saints 35–20. **Drive: 8 plays, 76 yards, 3:53.**
- IND – Drew Ogletree 33-yard pass from Gardner Minshew (Matt Gay kick), 8:19. Saints 35–27. **Drive: 6 play, 75 yards, 2:30.**
- IND – Blake Grupe 27-yard field goal, 0:24. Saints 38–27. **Drive: 9 plays, 58 yards, 3:24.**

**Top passers**

- NO – Derek Carr – 19/27, 310 yards, 2 TD
- IND – Gardner Minshew – 23/41, 213 yards, 2 TD, INT

**Top rushers**

- NO – Taysom Hill – 9 rushes, 63 yards, 2 TD
- IND – Jonathan Taylor – 12 rushes, 95 yards

**Top receivers**

- NO – Chris Olave – 5 receptions, 46 yards
- IND – Michael Pittman Jr. – 8 receptions, 40 yards, TD

The Saints still defeated the Colts 38–27, even after a tough loss from last Thursday. The Saints improve to 4–4 and tie for first in the division with their rival Falcons.

==== Week 9: vs. Chicago Bears ====
Week 9: Chicago Bears at New Orleans Saints – Game summary

Quarter	1	2	3	4	Total
Bears	7	7	3	0	**17**
**Saints**	7	7	3	7	**24**

at Caesars Superdome, New Orleans, Louisiana

- Date: November 5
- Game time: 12:00 p.m. CST
- Game weather: None (indoor stadium)
- Game attendance: 70,006
- Referee: Ronald Torbert
- TV announcers (CBS): Andrew Catalon, Tiki Barber, Matt Ryan and AJ Ross
- Recap, Game Book

Game information

**First quarter**

- CHI – Cole Kmet 18-yard pass from Tyson Bagent (Cairo Santos kick), 11:21. Bears 7–0. **Drive: 9 plays, 75 yards, 3:39.**
- NO – Chris Olave 8-yard pass from Derek Carr (Blake Grupe kick), 0:44. Tied 7–7. **Drive: 10 plays, 45 yards, 5:04.**

**Second quarter**

- CHI – Cole Kmet 9-yard pass from Tyson Bagent (Cairo Santos kick), 12:52. Bears 14–7. **Drive: 6 plays, 75 yards, 2:52.**
- NO – Taysom Hill 2-yard pass from Derek Carr (Blake Grupe kick), 6:05. Tied 14–14. **Drive: 11 plays, 75 yards, 6:47.**

**Third quarter**

- NO – Blake Grupe 55-yard field goal, 11:43. Saints 17–14. **Drive: 4 plays, 2 yards, 1:16.**
- CHI – Cairo Santos 31-yard field goal, 3:27. Tied 17–17. **Drive: 13 plays, 62 yards, 8:16.**

**Fourth quarter**

- NO – Juwan Johnson 3-yard pass from Taysom Hill (Blake Grupe kick), 11:05. Saints 24–17. **Drive: 5 plays, 47 yards, 2:54.**

**Top passers**

- CHI – Tyson Bagent – 18/30, 220 yards, 2 TD, 3 INT
- NO – Derek Carr – 25/34, 211 yards, 2 TD

**Top rushers**

- CHI – D'Onta Foreman – 20 rushes, 83 yards
- NO – Taysom Hill – 11 rushes, 52 yards

**Top receivers**

- CHI – Cole Kmet – 6 receptions, 46 yards, TD
- NO – Chris Olave – 6 receptions, 46 yards, TD

The Saints defeated the Bears 24–17, while the Atlanta Falcons lost to the Minnesota Vikings, thus bringing the Saints' record to 5–4 and allowing them to take the Number 1 spot in the NFC South.

==== Week 10: at Minnesota Vikings ====
Week 10: New Orleans Saints at Minnesota Vikings – Game summary

Quarter	1	2	3	4	Total
Saints	3	0	8	8	**19**
**Vikings**	3	21	3	0	**27**

at U.S. Bank Stadium, Minneapolis, Minnesota

- Date: November 12
- Game time: 12:00 p.m. CST
- Game weather: None (indoor stadium)
- Game attendance: 66,933
- Referee: Adrian Hill
- TV announcers (Fox): Adam Amin, Mark Schlereth and Kristina Pink
- Recap, Game Book

Game information

**First quarter**

- MIN – Greg Joseph 40-yard field goal, 10:47. Vikings 3–0. **Drive: 8 plays, 53 yards, 4:13.**
- NO – Blake Grupe 48-yard field goal, 1:19. Tied 3–3. **Drive: 10 plays, 46 yards, 4:58.**

**Second quarter**

- MIN – Ty Chandler 2-yard run (Greg Joseph kick), 10:14. Vikings 10–3. **Drive: 11 plays, 75 yards, 6:05.**
- MIN – Josh Dobbs 7-yard run (Greg Joseph kick), 3:30. Vikings 17–3. **Drive: 9 plays, 82 yards, 4:41.**
- MIN – T. J. Hockenson 28-yard pass from Josh Dobbs (Greg Joseph kick), 0:16. Vikings 24–3. **Drive: 7 plays, 76 yards, 1:31.**

**Third quarter**

- MIN – Greg Joseph 33-yard field goal, 10:09. Vikings 27–3. **Drive: 7 plays, 49 yards, 2:47.**
- NO – Chris Olave 14-yard pass from Jameis Winston (Alvin Kamara run), 5:26. Vikings 27–11. **Drive: 10 plays, 75 yards, 4:43.**

**Fourth quarter**

- NO – A. T. Perry 15-yard pass from Jameis Winston (Alvin Kamara run), 11:40. Vikings 27–19. **Drive: 9 plays, 56 yards, 3:15.**

**Top passers**

- NO – Jameis Winston – 13/25, 122 yards, 2 TD, 2 INT
- MIN – Josh Dobbs – 23/34, 268 yards, TD

**Top rushers**

- NO – Alvin Kamara – 9 rushes, 42 yards
- MIN – Ty Chandler – 15 rushes, 45 yards, TD

**Top receivers**

- NO – Chris Olave – 6 receptions, 94 yards, TD
- MIN – T. J. Hockenson – 11 receptions, 134 yards, TD

Coming off the win over the Bears, the Saints traveled to U.S. Bank Stadium to take on the Minnesota Vikings. The two teams played in London last season. The Saints still lost to the Vikings 27–19, in which they dropped to 5–5 on the season despite also being on top of the NFC South.

==== Week 12: at Atlanta Falcons ====
Week 12: New Orleans Saints at Atlanta Falcons – Game summary

Quarter	1	2	3	4	Total
Saints	3	6	3	3	**15**
**Falcons**	7	7	0	10	**24**

at Mercedes-Benz Stadium, Atlanta, Georgia

- Date: November 26
- Game time: 1:00 p.m. EST/12:00 p.m. CST
- Game weather: None (retractable roof closed)
- Game attendance: 70,166
- Referee: Brad Allen
- TV announcers (Fox): Joe Davis, Daryl Johnston and Pam Oliver
- Recap, Game Book

Game information

**First quarter**

- NO – Blake Grupe 25-yard field goal, 8:10. Saints 3–0. **Drive: 10 plays, 77 yards, 3:58.**
- ATL – Jessie Bates 92-yard interception return (Younghoe Koo kick), 1:46. Falcons 7–3.

**Second quarter**

- NO – Blake Grupe 52-yard field goal, 14:16. Falcons 7–6. **Drive: 7 plays, 41 yards, 2:30.**
- ATL – Bijan Robinson 10-yard run (Younghoe Koo kick), 8:56. Falcons 14–6. **Drive: 10 plays, 78 yards, 5:20.**
- NO – Blake Grupe 41-yard field goal, 3:54. Falcons 14–9. **Drive: 12 plays, 52 yards, 5:02.**

**Third quarter**

- NO – Blake Grupe 45-yard field goal, 3:27. Falcons 14–12. **Drive: 14 plays, 65 yards, 8:13.**
- ATL – Bijan Robinson 26-yard pass from Desmond Ridder (Younghoe Koo kick), 9:57. Falcons 21–12. **Drive: 9 plays, 95 yards, 5:03.**

**Fourth quarter**

- NO – Blake Grupe 39-yard field goal, 6:24. Falcons 21–15. **Drive: 8 plays, 54 yards, 3:33.**
- ATL – Younghoe Koo 39-yard field goal, 1:47. Falcons 24–15. **Drive: 10 plays, 54 yards, 4:37.**

**Top passers**

- NO – Derek Carr – 24/38, 304 yards, INT
- ATL – Desmond Ridder – 13/21, 168 yards, TD, 2 INT

**Top rushers**

- NO – Alvin Kamara – 15 rushes, 69 yards
- ATL – Bijan Robinson – 16 rushes, 91 yards, TD

**Top receivers**

- NO – Chris Olave – 7 receptions, 114 yards
- ATL – Drake London – 5 receptions, 91 yards

The Saints weren't able to win this game over the Atlanta Falcons, bringing their record to 5–6.

==== Week 13: vs. Detroit Lions ====
Week 13: Detroit Lions at New Orleans Saints – Game summary

Quarter	1	2	3	4	Total
**Lions**	21	3	3	6	**33**
Saints	0	7	14	7	**28**

at Caesars Superdome, New Orleans, Louisiana

- Date: December 3
- Game time: 12:00 p.m. CST
- Game weather: None (indoor stadium)
- Game attendance: 70,003
- Referee: Clay Martin
- TV announcers (Fox): Joe Davis, Daryl Johnston and Pam Oliver
- Recap, Game Book

Game information

**First quarter**

- DET – David Montgomery 2-yard run (Riley Patterson kick), 11:15. Lions 7–0. **Drive: 7 plays, 80 yards, 3:45.**
- DET – Sam LaPorta 13-yard pass from Jared Goff (Riley Patterson kick), 10:24. Lions 14–0. **Drive: 3 plays, 17 yards, 0:40.**
- DET – Amon-Ra St. Brown 25-yard pass from Jared Goff (Riley Patterson kick), 8:15. Lions 21–0. **Drive: 3 plays, 54 yards, 1:19.**

**Second quarter**

- NO – Jimmy Graham 6-yard pass from Derek Carr (Blake Grupe kick), 9:08. Lions 21–7. **Drive: 13 plays, 84 yards, 6:39.**
- DET – Riley Patterson 26-yard field goal, 0:08. Lions 24–7. **Drive: 12 plays, 62 yards, 5:16.**

**Third quarter**

- NO – Alvin Kamara 2-yard run (Blake Grupe kick), 10:04. Lions 24–14. **Drive: 10 plays, 75 yards, 4:56.**
- NO – Taysom Hill 1-yard run (Blake Grupe kick), 4:34. Lions 24–21. **Drive: 7 plays, 62 yards, 3:37.**
- DET – Riley Patterson 32-yard field goal, 0:00. Lions 27–21. **Drive: 7 plays, 65 yards, 4:34.**

**Fourth quarter**

- DET – Jameson Williams 19-yard run (pass failed), 14:07. Lions 33–21. **Drive: 2 plays, 26 yards, 0:49.**
- NO – Alvin Kamara 1-yard run (Blake Grupe kick), 7:30. Lions 33–28. **Drive: 12 plays, 75 yards, 6:37.**

**Top passers**

- DET – Jared Goff – 16/25, 213 yards, 2 TD
- NO – Derek Carr – 17/22, 226 yards, TD, INT

**Top rushers**

- DET – Jahmyr Gibbs – 8 rushes, 60 yards
- NO – Taysom Hill – 13 rushes, 59 yards, TD

**Top receivers**

- DET – Sam LaPorta – 9 receptions, 140 yards, TD
- NO – Chris Olave – 5 receptions, 119 yards

For the first time since the 2016 season, the Saints were defeated by the Lions. They fell to 5–7.

==== Week 14: vs. Carolina Panthers ====
Week 14: Carolina Panthers at New Orleans Saints – Game summary

Quarter	1	2	3	4	Total
Panthers	0	3	3	0	**6**
**Saints**	0	14	0	14	**28**

at Caesars Superdome, New Orleans, Louisiana

- Date: December 10
- Game time: 12:00 p.m. CST
- Game weather: None (indoor stadium)
- Game attendance: 70,009
- Referee: Alan Eck
- TV announcers (Fox): Kenny Albert, Jonathan Vilma, Shannon Spake, and Drew Brees
- Recap, Game Book

Game information

**First quarter**

- No scoring plays.

**Second quarter**

- NO – Alvin Kamara 9-yard run (Blake Grupe kick), 14:55. Saints 7–0. **Drive: 6 plays, 44 yards, 3:12.**
- CAR – Eddy Piñeiro 47-yard field goal, 9:16. Saints 7–3. **Drive: 12 plays, 46 yards, 5:39.**
- NO – D'Marco Jackson 8-yard fumble return (Blake Grupe kick), 4:37. Saints 14–3.

**Third quarter**

- CAR – Eddy Piñeiro 29-yard field goal, 4:57. Saints 14–6. **Drive: 12 plays, 75 yards, 6:16.**

**Fourth quarter**

- NO – Chris Olave 7-yard pass from Derek Carr (Blake Grupe kick), 5:59. Saints 21–6. **Drive: 5 plays, 64 yards, 2:13.**
- NO – Jimmy Graham 4-yard pass from Derek Carr (Blake Grupe kick), 4:29. Saints 28–6. **Drive: 4 plays, 24 yards, 0:58.**

**Top passers**

- CAR – Bryce Young – 13/36, 137 yards
- NO – Derek Carr – 18/26, 119 yards, 2 TD, INT

**Top rushers**

- CAR – Chuba Hubbard – 23 rushes, 87 yards
- NO – Alvin Kamara – 12 rushes, 56 yards, TD

**Top receivers**

- CAR – Adam Thielen – 5 receptions, 74 yards
- NO – Chris Olave – 4 receptions, 28 yards, TD

The Saints previously defeated the Panthers in Week 2. After scoring four touchdowns and allowing two field goals, the Saints held on with the 28–6 win over Carolina. They improve to 6–7 and sweep the Panthers for the first time since the 2020 season.

==== Week 15: vs. New York Giants ====
Week 15: New York Giants at New Orleans Saints – Game summary

Quarter	1	2	3	4	Total
Giants	3	3	0	0	**6**
**Saints**	7	0	10	7	**24**

at Caesars Superdome, New Orleans, Louisiana

- Date: December 17
- Game time: 12:00 p.m. CST
- Game weather: None (indoor stadium)
- Game attendance: 70,038
- Referee: Carl Cheffers
- TV announcers (Fox): Kenny Albert, Jonathan Vilma and Shannon Spake
- Recap, Game Book

Game information

**First quarter**

- NYG – Randy Bullock 56-yard field goal, 10:00. Giants 3–0. **Drive: 9 plays, 37 yards, 5:00.**
- NO – Keith Kirkwood 7-yard pass from Derek Carr (Blake Grupe kick), 0:29. Saints 7–3. **Drive: 11 plays, 68 yards, 6:35.**

**Second quarter**

- NYG – Jamie Gillan 40-yard field goal, 0:00. Saints 7–6. **Drive: 13 plays, 39 yards, 2:55.**

**Third quarter**

- NO – Juwan Johnson 23-yard pass from Derek Carr (Blake Grupe kick), 8:39. Saints 14–6. **Drive: 10 plays, 68 yards, 6:21.**
- NO – Blake Grupe 50-yard field goal, 4:17. Saints 17–6. **Drive: 5 plays, 25 yards, 2:03.**

**Fourth quarter**

- NO – Jimmy Graham 1-yard pass from Derek Carr (Blake Grupe kick), 10:47. Saints 24–6. **Drive: 11 plays, 65 yards, 7:02.**

**Top passers**

- NYG – Tommy DeVito – 20/34, 177 yards
- NO – Derek Carr – 23/28, 218 yards, 3 TD

**Top rushers**

- NYG – Tommy DeVito – 4 rushes, 36 yards
- NO – Alvin Kamara – 16 rushes, 66 yards

**Top receivers**

- NYG – Darius Slayton – 4 receptions, 63 yards
- NO – Alvin Kamara – 5 receptions, 44 yards

The Saints remain home in the Superdome to take on the New York Giants. It has been two seasons since they lost to them in overtime. For the first time since the 2018 season, the Saints defeated the Giants, primarily due to New Orleans dominating New York. They improve to 7–7, tying the Tampa Bay Buccaneers and allowing the Panthers to defeat the Falcons.

==== Week 16: at Los Angeles Rams ====
Week 16: New Orleans Saints at Los Angeles Rams – Game summary

Quarter	1	2	3	4	Total
Saints	0	7	0	15	**22**
**Rams**	7	10	10	3	**30**

at SoFi Stadium, Inglewood, California

- Date: December 21
- Game time: 7:15 p.m. CST/5:15 p.m. PST
- Game weather: Cloudy, 63 °F (17 °C)
- Game attendance: 73,228
- Referee: Brad Rogers
- TV announcers (WDSU/Prime Video): Al Michaels, Kirk Herbstreit and Kaylee Hartung
- Recap, Game Book

Game information

**First quarter**

- LAR – Puka Nacua 2-yard pass from Matthew Stafford (Lucas Havrisik kick), 2:28. Rams 7–0. **Drive: 14 plays, 95 yards, 7:56.**

**Second quarter**

- LAR – Lucas Havrisik 20-yard field goal, 10:23. Rams 10–0. **Drive: 7 plays, 50 yards, 3:09.**
- NO – Rashid Shaheed 45-yard pass from Derek Carr (Blake Grupe kick), 2:28. Rams 10–7. **Drive: 3 plays, 63 yards, 1:25.**
- LAR – Demarcus Robinson 4-yard pass from Matthew Stafford (Lucas Havrisik kick), 0:21. Rams 17–7. **Drive: 5 plays, 58 yards, 0:35.**

**Third quarter**

- LAR – Lucas Havrisik 22-yard field goal, 11:10. Rams 20–7. **Drive: 10 plays, 72 yards, 3:50.**
- LAR – Kyren Williams 10-yard run (Lucas Havrisik kick), 5:42. Rams 27–7. **Drive: 5 plays, 41 yards, 2:45.**

**Fourth quarter**

- LAR – Lucas Havrisik 32-yard field goal, 12:44. Rams 30–7. **Drive: 9 plays, 56 yards, 4:55.**
- NO – Juwan Johnson 5-yard pass from Derek Carr (Blake Grupe kick), 6:33. Rams 30–14. **Drive: 12 plays, 75 yards, 6:11.**
- NO – A. T. Perry 35-yard pass from Derek Carr (Derek Carr-Chris Olave pass), 3:53. Rams 30–22. **Drive: 2 plays, 35 yards, 0:40.**

**Top passers**

- NO – Derek Carr – 27/40, 319 yards, 3 TD, INT
- LAR – Matthew Stafford – 24/34, 328 yards, 2 TD

**Top rushers**

- NO – Alvin Kamara – 9 rushes, 19 yards
- LAR – Kyren Williams – 22 rushes, 104 yards, TD

**Top receivers**

- NO – Chris Olave – 9 receptions, 123 yards
- LAR – Puka Nacua – 9 receptions, 164 yards, TD

The Saints traveled to Sofi Stadium to take on the Los Angeles Rams. The Saints would lose this game and fall to 7–8.

==== Week 17: at Tampa Bay Buccaneers ====
Week 17: New Orleans Saints at Tampa Bay Buccaneers – Game summary

Quarter	1	2	3	4	Total
**Saints**	7	10	3	3	**23**
Buccaneers	0	0	0	13	**13**

at Raymond James Stadium, Tampa, Florida

- Date: December 31
- Game time: 1:00 p.m. EST/12:00 p.m. CST
- Game weather: Clear, 66 °F (19 °C)
- Game attendance: 65,471
- Referee: Land Clark
- TV announcers (Fox): Kevin Burkhardt, Greg Olsen, Erin Andrews and Tom Rinaldi
- Recap, Game Book

Game information

**First quarter**

- NO – Juwan Johnson 4-yard pass from Derek Carr (Blake Grupe kick), 7:04. Saints 7–0. **Drive: 14 plays, 73 yards, 7:56.**

**Second quarter**

- NO – Taysom Hill 22-yard pass from Derek Carr (Blake Grupe kick), 1:53. Saints 14–0. **Drive: 8 plays, 60 yards, 3:47.**
- NO – Blake Grupe 45-yard field goal, 0:09. Saints 17–0. **Drive: 7 plays, 19 yards, 1:25.**

**Third quarter**

- NO – Blake Grupe 28-yard field goal, 4:25. Saints 20–0. **Drive: 7 plays, 45 yards, 3:05.**

**Fourth quarter**

- TB – Trey Palmer 22-yard pass from Baker Mayfield (Chase McLaughlin kick), 7:50. Saints 20–7. **Drive: 8 plays, 91 yards, 2:40.**
- NO – Blake Grupe 38-yard field goal, 3:48. Saints 23–7. **Drive: 9 plays, 43 yards, 4:02.**
- TB – Chris Godwin 47-yard pass from Baker Mayfield (pass failed), 1:37. Saints 23–13. **Drive: 2 plays, 54 yards, 0:15.**

**Top passers**

- NO – Derek Carr – 24/32, 197 yards, 2 TD
- TB – Baker Mayfield – 22/33, 309 yards, 2 TD, 2 INT

**Top rushers**

- NO – Jamaal Williams – 19 rushes, 58 yards
- TB – Rachaad White – 11 rushes, 42 yards

**Top receivers**

- NO – Juwan Johnson – 8 receptions, 90 yards, TD
- TB – Chase Edmonds – 5 receptions, 40 yards

The Saints travel to Raymond James Stadium to take on the Buccaneers. In a must-win game, the Saints start off with the opening drive touchdown and held on with the 23–13 win, improving them to 8–8.

==== Week 18: vs. Atlanta Falcons ====
Week 18: Atlanta Falcons at New Orleans Saints – Game summary

Quarter	1	2	3	4	Total
Falcons	14	3	0	0	**17**
**Saints**	7	10	14	17	**48**

at Caesars Superdome, New Orleans, Louisiana

- Date: January 7
- Game time: 1:00 p.m. EST/12:00 p.m. CST
- Game weather: None (indoor stadium)
- Game attendance: 70,072
- Referee: John Hussey
- TV announcers (CBS): Andrew Catalon, Tiki Barber, Matt Ryan and AJ Ross
- Recap, Game Book

Game information

**First quarter**

- ATL – Jonnu Smith 15-yard pass from Desmond Ridder (Younghoe Koo kick), 8:42. Falcons 7–0. **Drive: 7 plays, 79 yards, 3:39.**
- NO – A. T. Perry 18-yard pass from Derek Carr (Blake Grupe kick), 5:01. Tied 7–7. **Drive: 7 plays, 75 yards, 3:41.**
- ATL – Bijan Robinson 71-yard pass from Desmond Ridder (Younghoe Koo kick), 4:13. Falcons 14–7. **Drive: 2 plays, 75 yards, 0:48.**

**Second quarter**

- NO – Kendre Miller 3-yard run (Blake Grupe kick), 11:04. Tied 14–14. **Drive: 16 plays, 75 yards, 8:09.**
- NO – Blake Grupe 24-yard field goal, 0:56. Saints 17–14. **Drive: 8 plays, 32 yards, 1:32.**
- ATL – Younghoe Koo 30-yard field goal, 0:00. Tied 17–17. **Drive: 10 plays, 63 yards, 0:56.**

**Third quarter**

- NO – Chris Olave 26-yard pass from Derek Carr (Blake Grupe kick), 13:01. Saints 24–17. **Drive: 2 plays, 25 yards, 0:35.**
- NO – Rashid Shaheed 39-yard pass from Derek Carr (Blake Grupe kick), 8:54. Saints 31–17. **Drive: 5 plays, 80 yards, 2:41.**

**Fourth quarter**

- NO – Blake Grupe 24-yard field goal, 9:57. Saints 34–17. **Drive: 12 plays, 92 yards, 6:17.**
- NO – A. T. Perry 6-yard pass from Derek Carr (Blake Grupe kick), 9:02. Saints 41–17. **Drive: 1 play, 10 yards, 0:07.**
- NO – Jamaal Williams 1-yard run (Blake Grupe kick), 1:10. Saints 48–17. **Drive: 1 play, 1 yard, 0:03.**

**Top passers**

- ATL – Desmond Ridder – 22/30, 291 yards, 2 TD, INT
- NO – Derek Carr – 22/28, 264 yards, 4 TD

**Top rushers**

- ATL – Bijan Robinson – 11 rushes, 28 yards
- NO – Kendre Miller – 13 rushes, 71 yards, TD

**Top receivers**

- ATL – Bijan Robinson – 7 receptions, 103 yards, TD
- NO – Taysom Hill – 4 receptions, 28 yards

The Saints were previously defeated by the Falcons. With a dominant comeback in the second half, the Saints go to 9–8, tying their record from the 2021 season. The game ended in controversy; with the team up 41–17, Saints head coach Dennis Allen called for a quarterback kneel to exhaust the final minute of the game. Instead, quarterback Jameis Winston handed the ball to running back Jamaal Williams who scored a one-yard touchdown. Williams had failed to record a rushing touchdown during the 2023 season up to that point. Allen and Falcons coach Arthur Smith would have a heated exchange on the field following the game's end over the perceived lack of sportsmanship.

Despite being eliminated from postseason contention, the Saints maintained a winning season.

=== Standings ===
==== Division ====
NFC South
	W	L	T	PCT	DIV	CONF	PF	PA	STK
^{(4)} Tampa Bay Buccaneers	9	8	0	.529	4–2	7–5	348	325	W1
New Orleans Saints	9	8	0	.529	4–2	6–6	402	327	W2
Atlanta Falcons	7	10	0	.412	3–3	4–8	321	373	L2
Carolina Panthers	2	15	0	.118	1–5	1–11	236	416	L3

==== Conference ====
NFC
#	Team	Division	W	L	T	PCT	DIV	CONF	SOS	SOV	STK
**Division leaders**
1 (Note: San Francisco finished ahead of Dallas and Detroit based on conference record, claiming the No. 1 seed.)	San Francisco 49ers	West	12	5	0	.706	5–1	10–2	.509	.475	L1
2 (Note: Dallas claimed the No. 2 seed over Detroit based on head-to-head victory.)	Dallas Cowboys	East	12	5	0	.706	5–1	9–3	.446	.392	W2
3	Detroit Lions	North	12	5	0	.706	4–2	8–4	.481	.436	W1
4 (Note: Tampa Bay finished ahead of New Orleans in the NFC South based on common record. (Tampa Bay is 8–4 against Minnesota, Chicago, Detroit, Green Bay, Atlanta, Carolina, Houston, Tennessee, Jacksonville, and Indianapolis, while New Orleans is 6–6 against the same teams.))	Tampa Bay Buccaneers	South	9	8	0	.529	4–2	7–5	.481	.379	W1
**Wild cards**
5	Philadelphia Eagles	East	11	6	0	.647	4–2	7–5	.481	.476	L2
6	Los Angeles Rams	West	10	7	0	.588	5–1	8–4	.529	.453	W4
7 (Note: Green Bay and Seattle finished ahead of New Orleans based on conference record.) (Note: Green Bay finished ahead of Seattle based on strength of victory, claiming the 7th and final playoff spot.)	Green Bay Packers	North	9	8	0	.529	4–2	7–5	.474	.458	W3
**Did not qualify for the postseason**
8	Seattle Seahawks	West	9	8	0	.529	2–4	7–5	.512	.392	W1
9	New Orleans Saints	South	9	8	0	.529	4–2	6–6	.433	.340	W2
10 (Note: Minnesota finished ahead of Atlanta based on head-to-head victory. Division tie break was initially used to eliminate Chicago (see below).) (Note: Minnesota finished ahead of Chicago based on common record. (Minnesota is 5–7 against Tampa Bay, Los Angeles Chargers, Carolina, Kansas City, Green Bay, Atlanta, New Orleans, Denver, Las Vegas, and Detroit, while Chicago is 4–8 against the same teams.))	Minnesota Vikings	North	7	10	0	.412	2–4	6–6	.509	.454	L4
11 (Note: Chicago finished ahead of Atlanta based on head-to-head victory.)	Chicago Bears	North	7	10	0	.412	2–4	6–6	.464	.370	L1
12	Atlanta Falcons	South	7	10	0	.412	3–3	4–8	.429	.462	L2
13	New York Giants	East	6	11	0	.353	3–3	5–7	.512	.353	W1
14 (Note: Washington finished ahead of Arizona based on head-to-head victory.)	Washington Commanders	East	4	13	0	.235	0–6	2–10	.512	.338	L8
15	Arizona Cardinals	West	4	13	0	.235	0–6	3–9	.561	.588	L1
16	Carolina Panthers	South	2	15	0	.118	1–5	1–11	.522	.500	L3
**Tiebreakers** (Note: When breaking ties for three or more teams under the NFL's rules, they are first broken within divisions, then comparing only the highest-ranked remaining team from each division.)
