= Chris Olave =

American football player (born 2000)

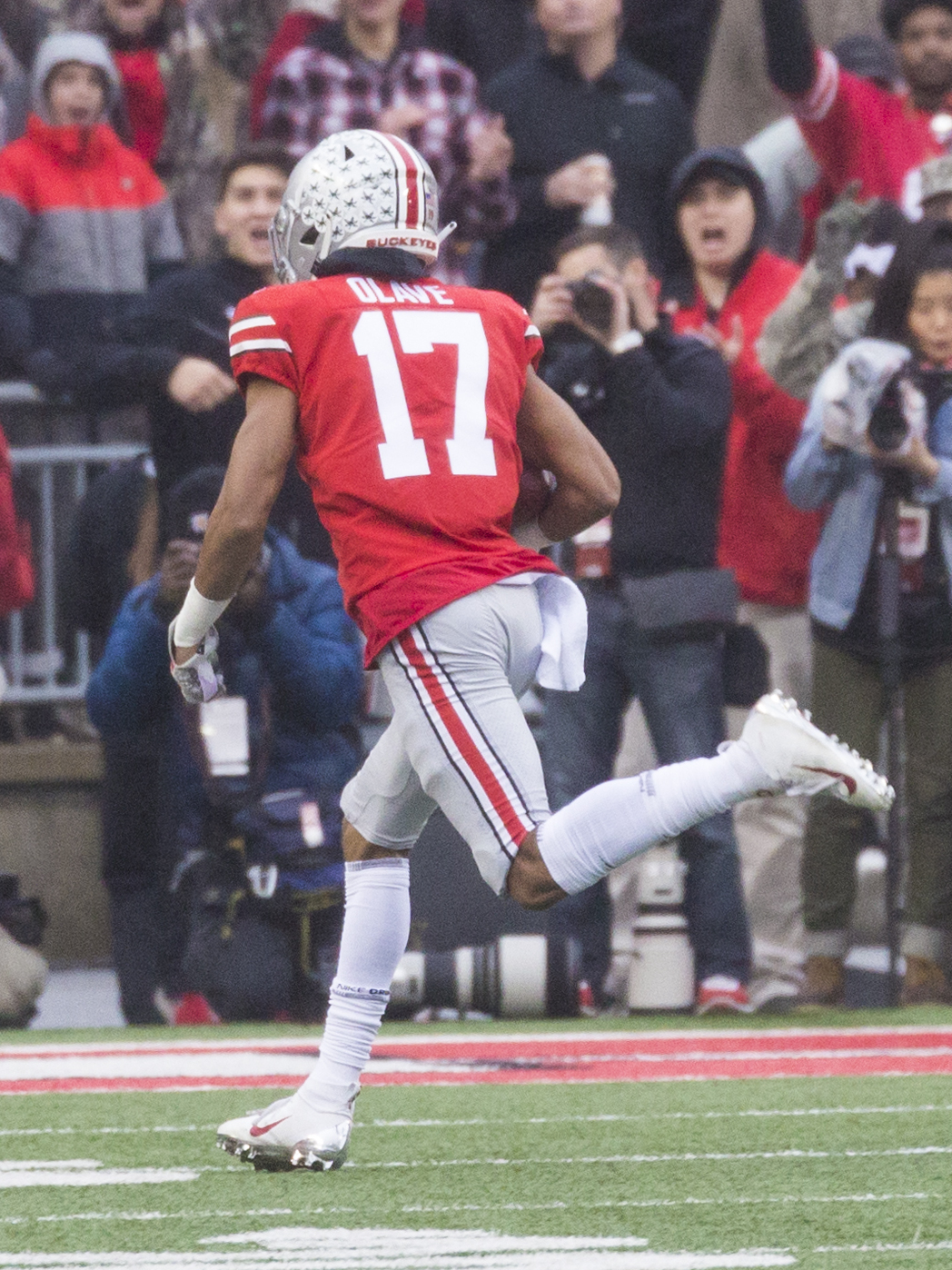
- Olave with the Ohio State Buckeyes in 2018

No. 12 – New Orleans Saints
- Position: Wide receiver
- Roster status: Active

Personal information
- Born: June 27, 2000 (age 26); San Ysidro, California, U.S.
- Listed height: 6 ft 0 in (1.83 m)
- Listed weight: 187 lb (85 kg)

Career information
- High school: Mission Hills (San Marcos, California)
- College: Ohio State (2018–2021)
- NFL draft: 2022: 1st round, 11th overall pick

Career history
- New Orleans Saints (2022–present)

Awards and highlights
- Second-team All-Pro (2025); PFWA All-Rookie Team (2022); 2× First-team All-Big Ten (2020, 2021); Third-team All-Big Ten (2019)

Career NFL statistics as of Week 10, 2026
- Receptions: 350
- Receiving yards: 4,492
- Receiving touchdowns: 21
- Stats at Pro Football Reference

Christian Josiah Olave (/oʊˈlɑːveɪ/ oh-LAH-vay; born June 27, 2000) is an American professional football wide receiver for the New Orleans Saints of the National Football League (NFL). He played college football for the Ohio State Buckeyes, where he is 2nd all-time in touchdown receptions at 35. Olave was selected 11th overall by the Saints in the first round of the 2022 NFL draft.

== Early life ==
Of Cuban descent on his father's side and African-American on his mother's, Olave was born on June 27, 2000, in San Ysidro, California. He played football at Eastlake High School in Chula Vista for two seasons before transferring to Mission Hills High School in San Marcos, California. He had to sit out his junior year due to California Interscholastic Federation transfer rules. During his senior season, Olave caught 93 passes for 1,764 yards and 26 touchdowns. He was also a member of the school's basketball and track teams. He committed to Ohio State University in January 2018.

== College career ==
As a freshman at Ohio State in 2018, Olave played on both offense and special teams. He recorded 12 catches for 197 yards and three touchdowns during his debut season. During the 2018 match up against Michigan, he was able to bring in two touchdowns and block a punt in the 62–39 Ohio State win. The following week in the 2018 Big Ten Football Championship Game, he caught five passes for 79 yards and a touchdown against Northwestern.

In the 2019 season, Olave had three games with two receiving touchdowns. His highest yard total came against Rutgers with four receptions for 139 receiving yards in the 56–21 victory. He finished with 48 receptions for 840 receiving yards and 12 receiving touchdowns.

In the 2020 season, Olave played in seven games due to the COVID-19 pandemic shortening the Buckeyes' season. He scored multiple receiving touchdowns in three games and went over 100 receiving yards in five games.

Olave recorded four games with multiple receiving touchdowns and five going over the 100-yard mark in the 2021 season. Olave finished the 2021 season with 65 receptions for 936 receiving yards and 13 receiving touchdowns. His 13 receiving touchdowns led the Big Ten. Following the season, Olave announced that he would be opting out of the 2022 Rose Bowl in order to prepare for the 2022 NFL draft.

== Professional career ==
Pre-draft measurables
| Height | Weight | Arm length | Hand span | Wingspan | 40-yard dash | 10-yard split | 20-yard split | Vertical jump | Broad jump |
|---|---|---|---|---|---|---|---|---|---|
| 6 ft 0 3/8 in (1.84 m) | 187 lb (85 kg) | 31 1/8 in (0.79 m) | 9 1/2 in (0.24 m) | 6 ft 1 1/8 in (1.86 m) | 4.39 s | 1.50 s | 2.46 s | 32.0 in (0.81 m) | 10 ft 4 in (3.15 m) |
All values from NFL Combine

=== 2022 ===
Olave was selected by the New Orleans Saints in the first round (11th overall) of the 2022 NFL draft. Olave made his NFL debut in Week 1 against the Atlanta Falcons with three receptions for 41 yards and a two-point conversion in the 27–26 victory. In Week 3, against the Carolina Panthers, Olave had nine receptions for 147 yards. In Week 4, against the Minnesota Vikings, he had his first professional touchdown reception on a four-yard reception from Andy Dalton. In Week 6 against the Seattle Seahawks, Olave suffered a grade 1 concussion in the 3rd a quarter leading him to miss his next game. He added two more games going over the 100-yard mark over the 2022 season. Olave finished his rookie season with 72 receptions for 1,042 receiving yards and four receiving touchdowns. He was named to the 2022 PFWA All-Rookie Team.

=== 2023 ===
On September 10, 2023, Olave caught eight passes for 112 yards against the Tennessee Titans in the 16–15 victory. He caught another 8 passes for 104 yards in Week 3 against the Green Bay Packers as the Saints lost 17–18. Olave suffered a grade 1 concussion in the third quarter of his Week 12 matchup against the Atlanta Falcons. He finished his sophomore campaign with 87 receptions for 1,123 yards and five touchdowns.

=== 2024 ===
On July 18, 2024, Olave was placed on the Active/Non-football injury or illness (NFI) list. He was activated prior to Week 1. Olave suffered his third career concussion in Week 6 against the Tampa Bay Buccaneers, missing one game. He suffered another concussion in Week 9 as well, this time missing the rest of the season. This marks his fourth concussion in Olave's professional career and fifth since starting college. He had 32 receptions for 400 yards and one touchdown, which came in Week 3 against the Philadelphia Eagles, in the 2024 season.

=== 2025 ===
In 2025, the Saints exercised the fifth-year option on Olave's contract. In Week 4 against the Buffalo Bills, Olave threw an interception to Cole Bishop while attempting a Philly Special-style trick play to Spencer Rattler. On January 1, 2026, it was reported that Olave developed a blood clot in one of his lungs, which caused him to miss the team's season finale against the Atlanta Falcons. Olave finished the season with a career-best 1,163 receiving yards and nine touchdowns on 100 catches.

=== 2026 ===
On July 30, 2026, Olave agreed to a four-year, $132 million contract extension with the Saints. In Week 1 against the Detroit Lions, Olave recorded ten receptions for a career–high 182 yards in a 30–31 overtime loss.

== Career statistics ==
=== NFL ===
Legend
| **Bold** | Career high |

==== Regular season ====
| Year | Team | Games | | Receiving | | | | | Fumbles | |
| Year | Team | GP | GS | Rec | Yds | Avg | Lng | TD | Fum | Lost |
|---|---|---|---|---|---|---|---|---|---|---|
| 2022 | NO | 15 | 9 | 72 | 1,042 | **14.5** | 53 | 4 | **2** | **2** |
| 2023 | NO | **16** | 11 | 87 | 1,123 | 12.9 | 51 | 5 | 0 | 0 |
| 2024 | NO | 8 | 8 | 32 | 400 | 12.5 | 39 | 1 | 1 | 1 |
| 2025 | NO | **16** | **16** | **100** | **1,163** | 11.6 | **62** | **9** | 0 | 0 |
| 2026 | NO | 9 | 9 | 59 | 764 | 12.9 | 47 | 2 | 0 | 0 |
| Career | | 64 | 53 | 350 | 4,492 | 12.8 | 62 | 21 | 3 | 3 |

=== College ===
| Year | Team | GP | Receiving | | | |
| Year | Team | GP | Rec | Yds | Avg | TD |
|---|---|---|---|---|---|---|
| 2018 | Ohio State | **14** | 12 | 197 | 16.4 | 3 |
| 2019 | Ohio State | **14** | 48 | 840 | **17.5** | 12 |
| 2020 | Ohio State | 7 | 50 | 729 | 16.2 | 8 |
| 2021 | Ohio State | 12 | **65** | **936** | 14.4 | **13** |
| Career | | 47 | 176 | 2,711 | 15.4 | 35 |

== Personal life ==
On October 23, 2023, Olave was arrested by the Kenner Police Department in Kenner, Louisiana on suspicion of reckless operation of a motor vehicle, reportedly driving 70 mph in a 35 mph zone.
