= Bryan Bresee =

American football player (born 2001)

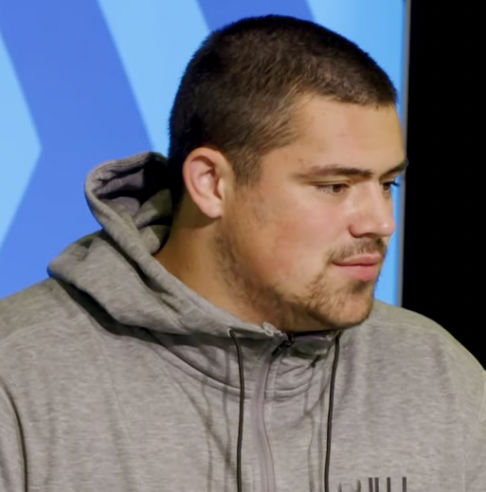
- Bresee at the 2023 NFL Combine

No. 90 – New Orleans Saints
- Position: Defensive tackle
- Roster status: Injured reserve

Personal information
- Born: October 6, 2001 (age 25); Damascus, Maryland, U.S.
- Listed height: 6 ft 5 in (1.96 m)
- Listed weight: 305 lb (138 kg)

Career information
- High school: Damascus
- College: Clemson (2020–2022)
- NFL draft: 2023: 1st round, 29th overall pick

Career history
- New Orleans Saints (2023–present)

Awards and highlights
- ACC Defensive Rookie of the Year (2020); First-team All-ACC (2020); Second-team All-ACC (2022); Third-team All-ACC (2021)

Career NFL statistics as of 2025
- Total tackles: 86
- Sacks: 14.5
- Forced fumbles: 2
- Pass deflections: 12
- Stats at Pro Football Reference

Bryan Bresee (/brəˈziː/ brə-ZEE; born October 6, 2001) is an American professional football defensive tackle for the New Orleans Saints of the National Football League (NFL). He played college football for the Clemson Tigers and was selected by the Saints in the first round of the 2023 NFL draft.

== Early life ==
Bresee played football at Urbana High School in Frederick, Maryland before transferring to Damascus High School in Damascus, Maryland. In both 2017 and 2019, he helped lead Damascus to state championship victories. Alongside his football prowess in highschool, Bresee also lettered in basketball, where he averaged 13.7 points and 11.9 rebounds a game. Bresee was a five-star recruit coming out of high school and was ranked as the nation's top overall recruit by 247Sports. He committed to Clemson, turning down offers from Penn State, Alabama, Georgia, and Ohio State. He was named to the All-American Bowl following his senior season.

== College career ==
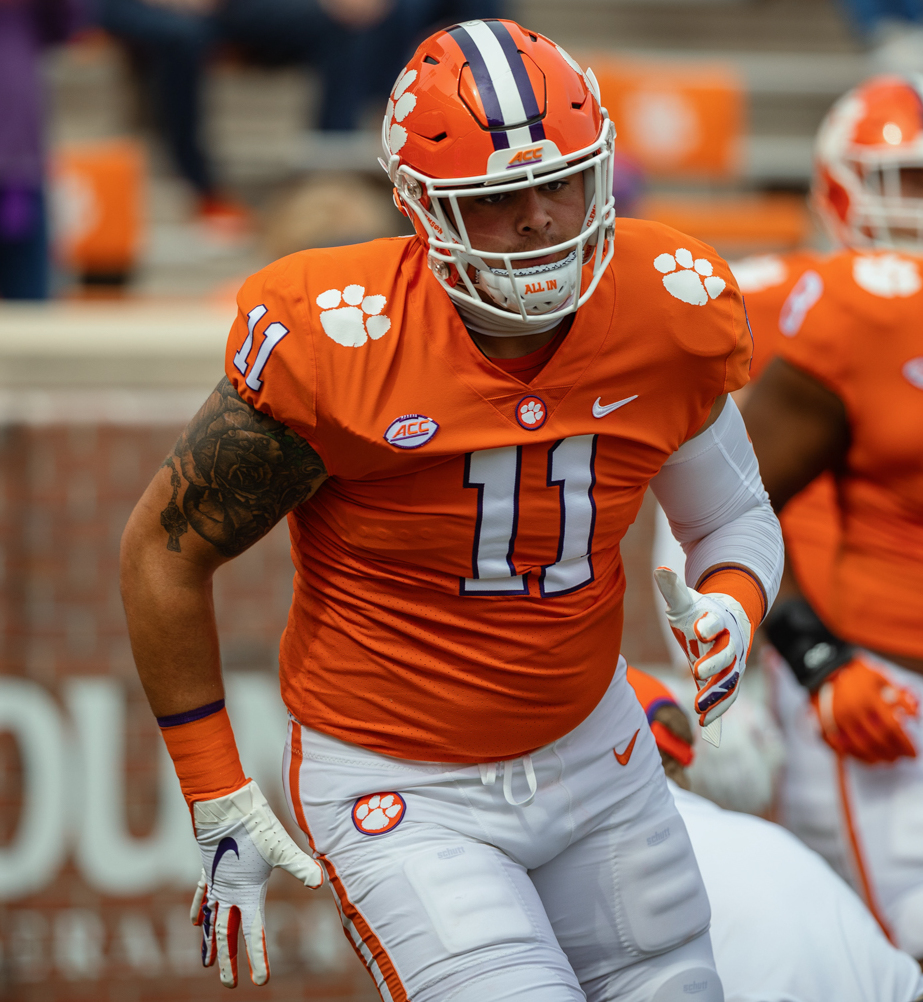
Bresee with the Clemson Tigers in 2020

Bresee started every game for Clemson as a freshman in 2020, recording 33 tackles, 6.5 tackles for loss and four sacks. In the CFP Semi Finals, Bresee performed 2.5 tackles for loss and a sack in the Tigers loss to Ohio State. At the conclusion of his freshman season, he was named the Atlantic Coast Conference (ACC) Defensive Rookie of the Year, and an All-ACC first team member. In 2021, Bresee suffered an ACL tear, which cut his season short to only four games, but nevertheless earned All-ACC honors. In 2022, Bresee missed several games due to injury and family matters but once again earned All-ACC honors.

== Professional career ==
Pre-draft measurables
Height	Weight	Arm length	Hand span	Wingspan	40-yard dash	10-yard split	20-yard split	20-yard shuttle	Three-cone drill	Vertical jump	Bench press
6 ft 5 1/2 in (1.97 m)	298 lb (135 kg)	32 1/2 in (0.83 m)	10 1/4 in (0.26 m)	6 ft 6 1/8 in (1.98 m)	4.86 s	1.71 s	2.82 s	4.38 s	7.41 s	29.0 in (0.74 m)	22 reps
All values from NFL Combine/Pro Day

Bresee was selected by the New Orleans Saints with the 29th pick in the first round of the 2023 NFL draft. He recorded his first career half sack in the season opener, a 16–15 win over the Tennessee Titans. His first full sack came three weeks later in a 9–26 loss to the Tampa Bay Buccaneers. As a rookie, he appeared in all 17 games in the 2023 season. He finished with 4.5 sacks, 24 total tackles (12 solo), and six passes defended.

Bresee spent the 2024 season operating mainly as a starter. In Week 14 against the New York Giants, Bresee blocked a field goal attempt by Graham Gano as regulation expired, giving the Saints a 14–11 victory.

Bresee entered the 2025 season as one of New Orleans' starting defensive tackles. In Week 5 against the New York Giants, Bresee forced a fumble on Cam Skattebo, which was returned 86 yards for a touchdown by Jordan Howden in an eventual 26–14 victory.

On April 8, 2026, the Saints exercised the fifth-year option on Bresee's contract. He suffered a torn ACL on the first day of training camp and was placed on season-ending injured reserve on August 7.

== NFL career statistics ==
Legend
**Bold**	Career high

=== Regular season ===
Year	Team	Games		Tackles					Fumbles				Interceptions			
Year	Team	GP	GS	Cmb	Solo	Ast	Sck	TFL	FF	FR	Yds	TD	Int	Yds	TD	PD
2023	NO	**17**	0	24	12	12	4.5	**7**	—	—	—	—	—	—	—	**6**
2024	NO	**17**	11	25	**17**	8	**7.5**	**7**	**1**	—	—	—	—	—	—	3
2025	NO	15	**15**	**37**	15	**22**	2.5	5	**1**	—	—	—	—	—	—	3
Career		49	26	86	44	42	14.5	19	2	—	—	—	—	—	—	12

== Personal life ==
Bresee's sister Ella died from brain cancer in 2022 at the age of 15.
