= Jordan Howden =

American football player (born 2000)

No. 31 – New Orleans Saints
- Position: Safety
- Roster status: Active

Personal information
- Born: May 14, 2000 (age 26); San Diego, California, U.S.
- Listed height: 6 ft 0 in (1.83 m)
- Listed weight: 209 lb (95 kg)

Career information
- High school: Desert Pines (Las Vegas, Nevada)
- College: Minnesota (2018–2022)
- NFL draft: 2023: 5th round, 146th overall pick

Career history
- New Orleans Saints (2023–present)

Career NFL statistics as of Week 8, 2026
- Total tackles: 127
- Sacks: 1
- Forced fumbles: 1
- Fumble recoveries: 2
- Pass deflections: 7
- Interceptions: 2
- Defensive touchdowns: 1
- Stats at Pro Football Reference

Jordan Howden (born May 14, 2000) is an American professional football safety for the New Orleans Saints of the National Football League (NFL). He played college football for the Minnesota Golden Gophers.

== Professional career ==
Pre-draft measurables
Height	Weight	Arm length	Hand span	Wingspan	40-yard dash	10-yard split	20-yard split	20-yard shuttle	Three-cone drill	Vertical jump	Broad jump	Bench press
5 ft 11 5/8 in (1.82 m)	203 lb (92 kg)	32 1/4 in (0.82 m)	9 1/2 in (0.24 m)	6 ft 5 1/8 in (1.96 m)	4.49 s	1.55 s	2.57 s	4.22 s	6.87 s	39.5 in (1.00 m)	9 ft 11 in (3.02 m)	14 reps
All values from NFL Combine/Pro Day

Howden was selected by the New Orleans Saints in the fifth round, 146th overall, of the 2023 NFL draft. He made 16 appearances (seven starts) for New Orleans during his rookie campaign, recording five pass deflections and one forced fumble, one sack, and 43 combined tackles.

Howden played in all 17 games for New Orleans during the 2024 season, recording two interceptions, two pass deflections, and 50 combined tackles.

Howden began the 2025 season as one of the Saints' auxiliary defensive backs. In Week 5 against the New York Giants, Howden recovered a Cam Skattebo fumble following a Bryan Bresee punch out, returning it 86 yards for his first-career touchdown.

== NFL career statistics ==
Legend
	Led the league
**Bold**	Career high

=== Regular season ===
Year	Team	Games		Tackles				Interceptions				Fumbles			
Year	Team	GP	GS	Cmb	Solo	Ast	Sck	Int	Yds	TD	PD	FF	FR	Yds	TD
2023	NO	16	**7**	43	23	20	**1.0**	–	–	–	**5**	**1**	–	–	–
2024	NO	**17**	4	**50**	**27**	**23**	–	**2**	**-2**	–	2	–	–	–	–
2025	NO	16	2	29	18	11	–	–	–	–	–	–	**1**	**86**	**1**
Career		49	13	122	68	54	1.0	2	-2	–	7	1	1	86	1
