= Kendre Miller =

American football player (born 2002)

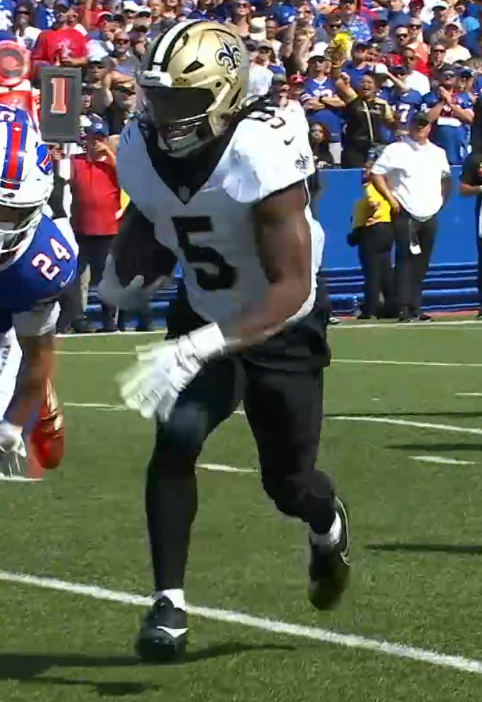
- Miller in 2025

No. 31 – Dallas Cowboys
- Position: Running back
- Roster status: Practice squad

Personal information
- Born: June 11, 2002 (age 24); Mount Enterprise, Texas, U.S.
- Listed height: 6 ft 0 in (1.83 m)
- Listed weight: 220 lb (100 kg)

Career information
- High school: Mount Enterprise
- College: TCU (2020–2022)
- NFL draft: 2023: 3rd round, 71st overall pick

Career history
- New Orleans Saints (2023–2026); Dallas Cowboys (2026–present)*
- * Offseason or practice squad member only

Awards and highlights
- First-team All-Big 12 (2022)

Career NFL statistics as of 2025
- Rushing yards: 497
- Rushing average: 3.9
- Rushing touchdowns: 3
- Receptions: 20
- Receiving yards: 180
- Stats at Pro Football Reference

Kendre Miller (born June 11, 2002) is an American professional football running back and kickoff returner for the Dallas Cowboys of the National Football League (NFL). He played college football for the TCU Horned Frogs. Miller was selected in the third round as the 71st pick of the 2023 NFL draft.

== Early life ==
Miller attended Mount Enterprise High School in Mount Enterprise, Texas. As a senior, he rushed for 2,508 yards and 34 touchdowns. He committed to Texas Christian University (TCU) to play college football.

== College career ==
As a true freshman at TCU in 2020, he rushed for 388 yards on 54 carries with two touchdowns. As a sophomore in 2021, he was second on the team with 623 rushing yards on 83 carries with seven touchdowns. Miller took over as TCU's starter in 2022. He ran for 1399 yards and 17 touchdowns, averaging 6.2 yards per carry.

== Professional career ==
Pre-draft measurables
Height	Weight	Arm length	Hand span	Wingspan
5 ft 11 1/8 in (1.81 m)	215 lb (98 kg)	32 3/8 in (0.82 m)	9 3/8 in (0.24 m)	6 ft 6 1/2 in (1.99 m)
All values from the NFL Combine

=== New Orleans Saints ===
Miller was drafted by the New Orleans Saints in the third round, 71st overall, of the 2023 NFL draft. He scored his first professional touchdown in Week 18 against the Atlanta Falcons on a three-yard rush. As a rookie, Miller appeared in eight games and finished with 41 carries for 156 yards and one rushing touchdown to go with ten receptions for 117 yards.

Miller began the 2024 season on injured reserve, and was activated by the team ahead of Week 6. In six appearances (two starts) for New Orleans, he rushed 39 times for 148 yards and one touchdown; he also had five receptions for 33 yards.

Miller made seven appearances for New Orleans during the 2025 season, recording 47 rushes for 193 yards and one touchdown. On October 20, 2025, Miller was placed on injured reserve after suffering a torn ACL in Week 7 against the Chicago Bears.

On November 7, 2026, Miller was waived by the Saints.

=== Dallas Cowboys ===
On November 11, 2026, Miller signed with the Dallas Cowboys practice squad.

== NFL career statistics ==
=== Regular season ===
Year	Team	Games		Rushing					Receiving					Returning					Fumbles	
Year	Team	GP	GS	Att	Yds	Avg	Lng	TD	Rec	Yds	Avg	Lng	TD	Ret	Yds	Avg	Lng	TD	Fum	Lost
2023	NO	8	0	41	156	3.8	18	1	10	117	11.7	33	0	-	-	-	-	-	0	0
2024	NO	6	2	39	148	3.8	17	1	5	33	6.6	16	0	6	176	29.3	41	0	0	0
2025	NO	7	0	47	193	4.1	18	1	5	30	6.0	11	0	16	393	24.6	43	0	0	0
2026	NO	6	1	57	159	2.8	11	2	9	37	4.1	13	0	2	37	18.5	19	0	2	1
Career		27	3	184	656	3.6	18	5	29	217	7.5	33	0	24	606	25.3	43	0	2	1
