= Alan Eck =

American football official (born 1969)

- Born: March 8, 1969 (age 57); Williamsport, Pennsylvania, U.S.
- Education: Bloomsburg University of Pennsylvania
- Occupation: NFL official (2016–present)

Alan A. Eck (born March 8, 1969) is an American professional football official in the National Football League (NFL) since the 2016 NFL season, wearing uniform number 76.

== Career ==
Eck officiated in the Big 12 Conference and the Mountain West Conference. Prior to officiating, Eck was a quarterback for the Bloomsburg University Huskies, where he holds the school record for most pass completions in a season with 194.

Eck was hired by the NFL in 2016 as a side judge. He was reassigned to the umpire position in 2017, and was promoted to referee for the start of the 2023 NFL season following the retirement of Jerome Boger.

=== 2024 crew ===
- R: Alan Eck
- U: Tab Slaughter
- DJ: Derick Bowers
- LJ: Derek Anderson
- FJ: John Jenkins
- SJ: Dale Shaw
- BJ: Greg Meyer
- RO: Joe Wollan
- RA: Larry Hanson

== Personal life ==
Eck resides in Cumming, Georgia. Outside of the NFL, Eck was an indirect tax manager for a Atlanta, Georgia-based construction and civil engineering company, retiring prior to the 2023 NFL season.
