= 2026 Atlanta Falcons season =

61st season in franchise history

- Owner: Arthur Blank
- General manager: Ian Cunningham
- President: Greg Beadles
- Head coach: Kevin Stefanski
- Offensive coordinator: Tommy Rees
- Defensive coordinator: Jeff Ulbrich
- Home stadium: Mercedes-Benz Stadium

Results
- Record: 3–7
- Division place: 3rd NFC South

Uniform
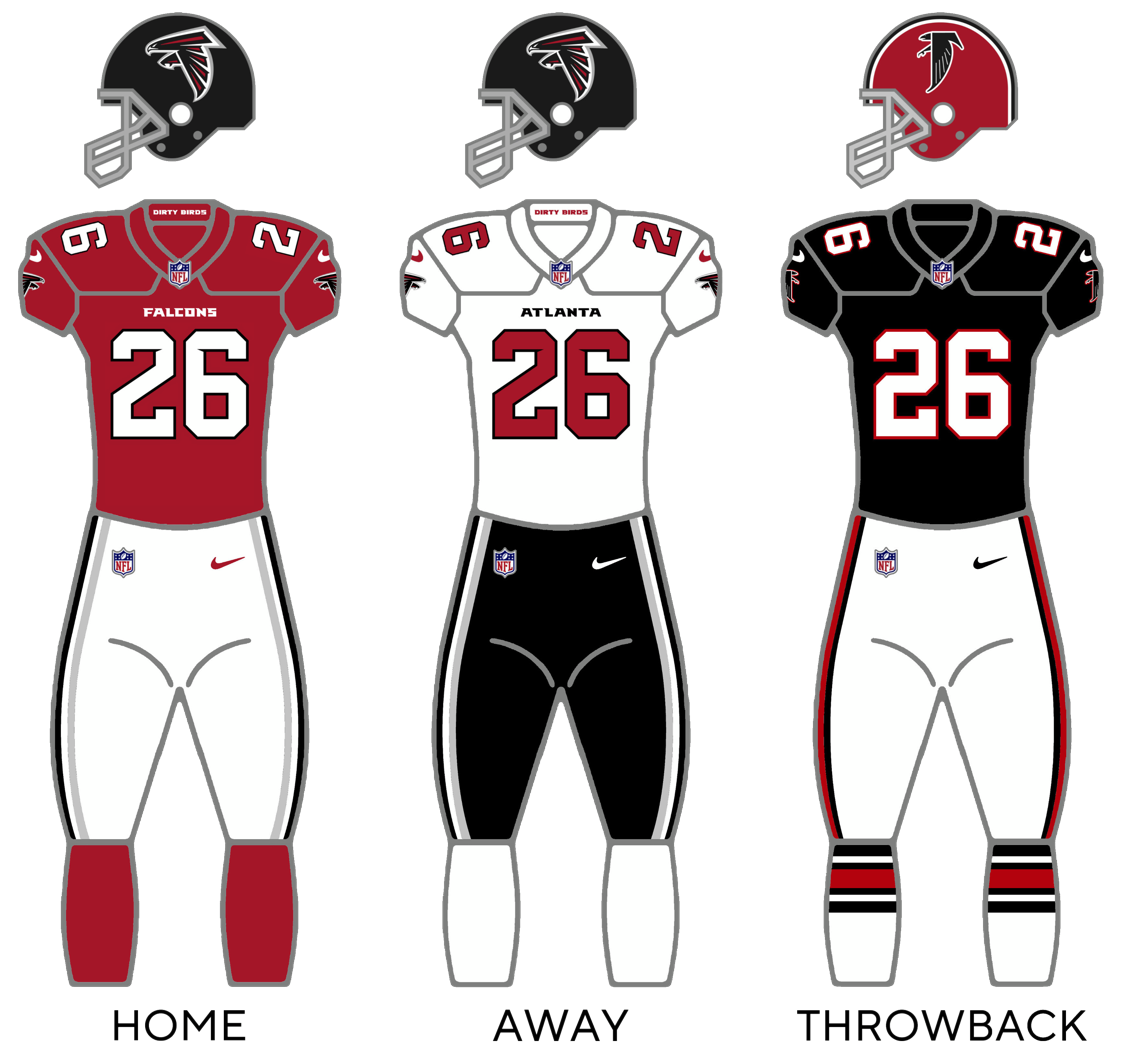

The 2026 season is the Atlanta Falcons' 61st in the National Football League (NFL), their tenth playing their home games at Mercedes-Benz Stadium, and their first under the leadership of general manager Ian Cunningham and head coach Kevin Stefanski. They will seek to improve on their 8–9 record from the previous two seasons, make the playoffs after an eight-year absence, and end their nine-year NFC South title drought. The Falcons also unveiled new uniforms on April 2, 2026, after six seasons with their old set. This is Stefanski's second head coaching job; he was previously the head coach of the Browns from 2020 to 2025. In week 14, he will make his first return to Cleveland since the Browns fired him.

== Offseason ==
=== Staff changes ===
Following the end of the 2025 season, the Falcons fired general manager Terry Fontenot and head coach Raheem Morris.

On January 10, the Falcons hired their former longtime quarterback, Matt Ryan, as president of football.

On January 17, the team announced Kevin Stefanski their new head coach.

Ian Cunningham was named general manager on January 29, 2026.

=== Draft ===
2026 Atlanta Falcons draft selections
Round	Selection	Player	Position	College	Notes
1	13	Traded to the Los Angeles Rams			
2	48	Avieon Terrell	CB	Clemson	
3	79	Zachariah Branch	WR	Georgia	
4	134	Kendal Daniels	LB	Oklahoma	From Las Vegas
5	153	Traded to the Philadelphia Eagles			
6	208	Anterio Thompson	DT	Washington	From Buffalo and NY Jets
6	215	Harold Perkins Jr.	LB	LSU	From Philadelphia
7	231	Ethan Onianwa	T	Ohio State	

2026 Atlanta Falcons undrafted free agents
Name	Position	College	Ref.
Carlos Allen Jr.	DT	Houston	
Vinny Anthony II	WR	Wisconsin	
James Brockermeyer	C	Miami (FL)	
Le'Meke Brockington	WR	Minnesota	
Malcolm DeWalt IV	CB	Akron	
Kam Dewberry	G	Alabama	
Philip Florenzo	LS	Clemson	
Brandon Frazier	TE	Auburn	
Cash Jones	RB	Georgia	
Riley Mahlman	OT	Wisconsin	
Keelan Marion	WR	Miami (FL)	
CJ Nunnally IV	DE	Purdue	
Jack Strand	QB	Minnesota State–Moorhead	
Jack Velling	TE	Michigan State	

== Staff ==
Atlanta Falcons staff
Front office: Owner/chairman – Arthur Blank; President/CEO – Greg Beadles; President of football – Matt Ryan; General manager – Ian Cunningham; Assistant general manager – Jeff Scott; Director of scouting – Adetokunbo Abanikanda; Director of college scouting – Shawn Heinlein; Assistant director of college scouting – Michael Ross; Senior vice president of football administration/senior personnel executive – Bryce Johnston; Senior personnel executive – Ruston Webster; Head coaches: Head coach – Kevin Stefanski; Offensive coaches: Offensive coordinator – Tommy Rees; Passing game coordinator – Tanner Engstrand; Quarterbacks – Alex Van Pelt; Assistant quarterbacks – Jordan Reid; Runningbacks – Michael Pitre; Wide receivers – Robert Prince; Tight ends – Kevin Koger; Offensive line/run game coordinator – Bill Callahan; Assistant offensive line – Nick Jones; Assistant offensive line – Matt Jones; Coaching fellow/offensive assistant – Michael Bearden	Defensive coaches: Defensive coordinator – Jeff Ulbrich; Defensive passing game coordinator – Patrick Toney; Defensive line – Nate Ollie; Outside linebackers – John Timu; Inside linebackers – Barrett Ruud; Secondary – Justin Hood; Assistant defensive backs/nickels – Ricky Manning; Senior defensive assistant – Dave Huxtable; Defensive quality control – Troy Kruchten; Special teams coaches: Special teams coordinator – Craig Aukerman; Assistant special teams – Chase Blackburn; Support staff/coaching operations: Senior advisor to the head coach – Bob Quinn; Director of coaching operations – Brian Griffin; Manager of coaching operations – Jacqueline Roberts; Coordinator of coaching operations – Madison McDoulett; Strength and conditioning: Director of player performance – John Griffin; Assistant director of strength & conditioning – Paul Constantine; Assistant director of strength & conditioning – Erik Jernstrom; Assistant director of strength & conditioning – Josh Nelson; → Coaching Staff → Front Office → More NFL staffs

== Current roster ==
Atlanta Falcons roster
Quarterbacks (QB): 13 Andy Dalton; 9 Michael Penix Jr.; 18 Jack Strand; 1 Tua Tagovailoa; Running backs (RB): 7 Bijan Robinson; 25 Khalil Herbert; Wide receivers (WR): 19 Chris Blair; 17 Zachariah Branch KR; 88 Beaux Collins; 4 Jahan Dotson; 5 Drake London; 14 Olamide Zaccheaus; Tight ends (TE): 81 Austin Hooper; 87 Nick Muse; 8 Kyle Pitts; 89 Charlie Woerner	Offensive linemen (OL): 65 Matthew Bergeron G; 68 Kyle Hinton G; 62 Corey Levin C/G; 63 Chris Lindstrom G; 70 Jake Matthews T; 75 Ethan Onianwa T; 71 Jawaan Taylor T; 74 Andrew Vorhees G; 73 Cameron Williams T; Defensive linemen (DL): 95 Gervon Dexter DT; 54 Brandon Dorlus DE; 96 Zach Harrison DE; 94 LaCale London DT; 27 James Pearce Jr. DE; 92 Maason Smith DT; 55 Za'Darius Smith DE; 47 Charles Snowden DE; 99 Cameron Thomas DE	Linebackers (LB): 22 Yasir Abdullah; 53 Kendal Daniels; 0 Divine Deablo; 45 Christian Harris; 56 Harold Perkins Jr.; 46 Josh Woods; Defensive backs (DB): 33 Billy Bowman Jr. CB; 29 Sydney Brown; 28 Mike Ford CB; 23 DeMarcco Hellams S; 26 C. J. Henderson CB; 21 Mike Hughes CB; 37 Robert Longerbeam CB; 24 A. J. Terrell CB; 12 Avieon Terrell CB; 31 Xavier Watts S; Special teams (ST): 16 Jake Bailey P; 49 Liam McCullough LS; 39 Jake Moody K	Practice squad: 86 Vinny Anthony WR; 41 Brian Asamoah LB; 61 Kam Dewberry G; 80 Dylan Drummond WR; 66 Gus Hartwig C; 30 Darnay Holmes CB; 51 Jared Ivey LB; 84 E. J. Jenkins TE; 76 Riley Mahlman T; 38 Jam Miller RB; 93 Zacch Pickens DT; 43 TJ Quinn LB; 34 Jammie Robinson S; 67 Josh Thompson G; 32 Delarrin Turner-Yell S; 82 Antwane Wells Jr. WR; Reserve: 40 JD Bertrand ILB (IR); 52 Samson Ebukam DE (IR); 90 Da'Shawn Hand DT (IR); 72 Michael Jerrell T (IR); 50 DeAngelo Malone OLB (PUP); 77 Storm Norton T (PUP); 15 Brian Robinson Jr. RB (IR); 44 Trey Sermon RB (IR); 98 Anterio Thompson DT (NF-Inj.); 11 Jalon Walker OLB (IR) 53 active, 16 practice squad, 10 reserve As of November 14, 2026. Rookies in italics.; Roster; Depth chart; Transactions

== Preseason ==
Week	Date	Opponent	Result	Record	Venue	Recap
1	August 14	Denver Broncos	L 7–27	0–1	Mercedes-Benz Stadium	Recap
2	August 22	at Indianapolis Colts	W 34–6	1–1	Lucas Oil Stadium	Recap
3	August 28	at Miami Dolphins	W 17–12	2–1	Hard Rock Stadium	Recap

== Regular season ==
=== Schedule ===
Week	Date	Time (ET)	Opponent	Result	Record	Venue	Network	Recap
1	September 13	1:00 p.m.	at Pittsburgh Steelers	**L** 13–20	0–1	Acrisure Stadium	Fox	Recap
2	September 20	1:00 p.m.	**Carolina Panthers**	**L** 3–34	0–2	Mercedes-Benz Stadium	Fox	Recap
3	September 24	8:15 p.m.	at Green Bay Packers	**W** 35–14	1–2	Lambeau Field	Prime Video	Recap
4	October 5	8:15 p.m.	at **New Orleans Saints**	**W** 45–24	2–2	Caesars Superdome	ESPN	Recap
5	October 11	8:20 p.m.	Baltimore Ravens	**L** 23–30 (OT)	2–3	Mercedes-Benz Stadium	NBC	Recap
6	October 18	1:00 p.m.	Chicago Bears	**L** 23–31	2–4	Mercedes-Benz Stadium	Fox	Recap
7	October 25	1:00 p.m.	San Francisco 49ers	**W** 29–20	3–4	Mercedes-Benz Stadium	Fox	Recap
8	November 1	1:00 p.m.	at **Tampa Bay Buccaneers**	**L** 0–16	3–5	Raymond James Stadium	Fox	Recap
9	November 8	9:30 a.m.	Cincinnati Bengals	**L** 17–34	3–6	(Spain) Bernabéu (Madrid)	NFLN	Recap
10	November 15	1:00 p.m.	Kansas City Chiefs	**L** 13–35	3–7	Mercedes-Benz Stadium	CBS	Recap
11	Bye							
12	November 29	1:00 p.m.	at Minnesota Vikings			U.S. Bank Stadium	Fox	
13	December 6	1:00 p.m.	Detroit Lions			Mercedes-Benz Stadium	CBS	
14	December 13	1:00 p.m.	at Cleveland Browns			Huntington Bank Field	CBS	
15	December 20	1:00 p.m.	at Washington Commanders			Northwest Stadium	Fox	
16	December 26/27	TBD	**Tampa Bay Buccaneers**			Mercedes-Benz Stadium	TBD	
17	January 3	1:00 p.m.	**New Orleans Saints**			Mercedes-Benz Stadium	Fox	
18	January 9/10	TBD	at **Carolina Panthers**			Bank of America Stadium	TBD	

Notes

- Intra-division opponents are in **bold** text.
- Networks, dates and times from Weeks 13–17 are subject to change as a result of flexible scheduling.
- The date, time and network for Week 16 will be finalized by no later than the end of Week 14.
- The date, time and network for Week 18 will be finalized at the end of Week 17.

=== Game summaries ===
==== Week 1: at Pittsburgh Steelers ====
Week 1: Atlanta Falcons at Pittsburgh Steelers – Game summary

Quarter	1	2	3	4	Total
Falcons	7	0	3	3	**13**
**Steelers**	3	10	0	7	**20**

at Acrisure Stadium, Pittsburgh, Pennsylvania

- Date: September 13
- Game time: 1:00 p.m. EDT
- Game weather: Cloudy, 77 °F (25 °C)
- Game attendance: 66,089
- Referee: Brad Rogers
- TV announcers (Fox): Joe Davis, Greg Olsen and Pam Oliver
- Recap, Game Book

Game information

**First quarter**

- PIT – Chris Boswell 43-yard field goal, 8:30. Steelers 3–0. **Drive: 8 plays, 43 yards, 3:34.**
- ATL – Bijan Robinson 23-yard pass from Cooper Rush (Nick Folk kick), 1:13. Falcons 7–3. **Drive: 3 plays, 25 yards, 1:28.**

**Second quarter**

- PIT – Chris Boswell 28-yard field goal, 12:28. Falcons 7–6. **Drive: 8 plays, 61 yards, 3:45.**
- PIT – Pat Freiermuth 6-yard pass from Aaron Rodgers (Chris Boswell kick), 10:39. Steelers 13–7. **Drive: 4 plays, 31 yards, 1:27.**

**Third quarter**

- ATL – Nick Folk 51-yard field goal, 1:50. Steelers 13–10. **Drive: 5 plays, 23 yards, 2:51.**

**Fourth quarter**

- PIT – T. J. Watt 35-yard interception return (Chris Boswell kick), 14:05. Steelers 20–10.
- ATL – Nick Folk 43-yard field goal, 10:35. Steelers 20–13. **Drive: 6 plays, 42 yards, 3:30.**

**Top passers**

- ATL – Cooper Rush – 12/22, 143 yards, TD, 2 INT
- PIT – Aaron Rodgers – 24/40, 221 yards, TD

**Top rushers**

- ATL – Bijan Robinson – 21 rushes, 83 yards
- PIT – Jaylen Warren – 10 rushes, 46 yards

**Top receivers**

- ATL – Bijan Robinson – 8 receptions, 90 yards, TD
- PIT – Michael Pittman Jr. – 3 receptions, 58 yards

This marked the Falcons' sixth loss to the Steelers since 2010.

==== Week 2: vs. Carolina Panthers ====
Week 2: Carolina Panthers at Atlanta Falcons – Game summary

Quarter	1	2	3	4	Total
**Panthers**	10	10	14	0	**34**
Falcons	0	3	0	0	**3**

at Mercedes-Benz Stadium, Atlanta, Georgia

- Date: September 20
- Game time: 1:00 p.m. EDT
- Game weather: None (retractable roof closed)
- Game attendance: 71,143
- Referee: Alex Moore
- TV announcers (Fox): Tim Brando, Matt Millen and Sarah Kustok
- Recap, Game Book

Game information

**First quarter**

- CAR – Chuba Hubbard 3-yard pass from Bryce Young (Ryan Fitzgerald kick), 10:48. Panthers 7–0. **Drive: 8 plays, 35 yards, 3:42.**
- CAR – Ryan Fitzgerald 37-yard field goal, 4:29. Panthers 10–0. **Drive: 7 plays, 10 yards, 2:46.**

**Second quarter**

- CAR – Ryan Fitzgerald 25-yard field goal, 5:54. Panthers 13–0. **Drive: 9 plays, 73 yards, 3:36.**
- ATL – Nick Folk 41-yard field goal, 1:07. Panthers 13–3. **Drive: 13 plays, 65 yards, 4:47.**
- CAR – Darren Waller 7-yard pass from Bryce Young (Ryan Fitzgerald kick), 0:20. Panthers 20–3. **Drive: 6 plays, 73 yards, 0:47.**

**Third quarter**

- CAR – Darren Waller 12-yard pass from Bryce Young (Ryan Fitzgerald kick), 9:38. Panthers 27–3. **Drive: 10 plays, 73 yards, 5:22.**
- CAR – Devin Lloyd 16-yard interception return (Ryan Fitzgerald kick), 2:58. Panthers 34–3.

**Fourth quarter**

- No scoring plays

**Top passers**

- CAR – Bryce Young – 23/36, 287 yards, 3 TD
- ATL – Cooper Rush – 10/17, 86 yards, 2 INT

**Top rushers**

- CAR – Chuba Hubbard – 12 rushes, 53 yards
- ATL – Bijan Robinson – 16 rushes, 72 yards

**Top receivers**

- CAR – Tetairoa McMillan – 5 receptions, 101 yards
- ATL – Drake London – 4 receptions, 51 yards

This marked the Falcons' fourth straight loss to the Panthers.

==== Week 3: at Green Bay Packers ====
Week 3: Atlanta Falcons at Green Bay Packers – Game summary

Quarter	1	2	3	4	Total
**Falcons**	7	10	7	11	**35**
Packers	7	0	0	7	**14**

at Lambeau Field, Green Bay, Wisconsin

- Date: September 24
- Game time: 8:15 p.m. EDT/7:15 p.m. CDT
- Game weather: Cloudy, 61 °F (16 °C)
- Game attendance: 76,955
- Referee: Shawn Smith
- TV announcers (Prime Video, WAGA, WGBA): Al Michaels, Kirk Herbstreit and Kaylee Hartung
- Recap, Game Book

Game information

**First quarter**

- GB – Christian Watson 4-yard pass from Jordan Love (Trey Smack kick), 5:13. Packers 7–0. **Drive: 9 plays, 87 yards, 4:53.**
- ATL – Bijan Robinson 3-yard rush (Nick Folk kick), 1:32. Tied 7–7. **Drive: 7 plays, 85 yards, 3:41.**

**Second quarter**

- ATL – Nick Folk 44-yard field goal, 4:48. Falcons 10–7. **Drive: 8 plays, 38 yards, 4:47.**
- ATL – Austin Hooper 5-yard pass from Michael Penix Jr. (Nick Folk kick), 0:59. Falcons 17–7. **Drive: 8 plays, 63 yards, 2:43.**

**Third quarter**

- ATL – Brian Robinson Jr. 7-yard rush (Nick Folk kick), 3:38. Falcons 24–7. **Drive: 10 plays, 92 yards, 6:18.**

**Fourth quarter**

- ATL – Nick Folk 31-yard field goal, 10:57. Falcons 27–7. **Drive: 7 plays, 79 yards, 4:58.**
- GB – Matthew Golden 15-yard pass from Jordan Love (Trey Smack kick), 8:18. Falcons 27–14. **Drive: 10 plays, 76 yards, 2:39.**
- ATL – Bijan Robinson 2-yard rush (Chris Blair pass from Michael Penix Jr.), 3:33. Falcons 35–14. **Drive: 8 plays, 67 yards, 4:45.**

**Top passers**

- ATL – Michael Penix Jr. – 18/25, 256 yards, TD, INT
- GB – Jordan Love – 28/53, 318 yards, 2 TD, INT

**Top rushers**

- ATL – Bijan Robinson – 29 rushes, 194 yards
- GB – MarShawn Lloyd – 4 rushes, 11 yards

**Top receivers**

- ATL – Drake London – 9 receptions, 194 yards
- GB – Christian Watson – 7 receptions, 96 yards, TD

The Falcons earned their first win at Lambeau Field since 2008 and became the first team since the 2012 49ers to defeat the Packers in their home opener.

==== Week 4: at New Orleans Saints ====
Week 4: Atlanta Falcons at New Orleans Saints – Game summary

Quarter	1	2	3	4	Total
**Falcons**	14	10	7	14	**45**
Saints	0	7	3	14	**24**

at Caesars Superdome, New Orleans, Louisiana

- Date: October 5
- Game time: 8:15 p.m. EDT/7:15 p.m. CDT
- Game weather: None (indoor stadium)
- Game attendance: 70,007
- Referee: Land Clark
- TV announcers (ESPN, WANF, WDSU): Joe Buck, Troy Aikman, Lisa Salters and Laura Rutledge
- Recap, Game Book

Game information

**First quarter**

- ATL – Bijan Robinson 59-yard run (Nick Folk kick), 13:34. Falcons 7–0. **Drive: 3 plays, 80 yards, 1:26.**
- ATL – Bijan Robinson 4-yard run (Nick Folk kick), 0:48. Falcons 14–0. **Drive: 5 plays, 22 yards, 1:59.**

**Second quarter**

- NO – Alvin Kamara 3-yard run (Daniel Carlson kick), 14:57. Falcons 14–7. **Drive: 3 plays, 54 yards, 0:51.**
- ATL – Brian Robinson Jr. 4-yard run (Nick Folk kick), 8:59. Falcons 21–7. **Drive: 10 plays, 65 yards, 5:58.**
- ATL – Nick Folk 29-yard field goal, 3:07. Falcons 24–7. **Drive: 10 plays, 75 yards, 4:45.**

**Third quarter**

- NO – Daniel Carlson 27-yard field goal, 7:38. Falcons 24–10. **Drive: 13 plays, 59 yards, 7:22.**
- ATL – Brian Robinson Jr. 8-yard run (Nick Folk kick), 2:11. Falcons 31–10. **Drive: 9 plays, 74 yards, 5:27.**

**Fourth quarter**

- NO – Alvin Kamara 5-yard run (Daniel Carlson kick), 13:00. Falcons 31–17. **Drive: 13 plays, 68 yards, 4:11.**
- ATL – Jahan Dotson 31-yard pass from Michael Penix Jr. (Nick Folk kick), 9:50. Falcons 38–17. **Drive: 5 plays, 72 yards, 3:10.**
- ATL – Brian Robinson Jr. 11-yard run (Nick Folk kick), 6:52. Falcons 45–17. **Drive: 3 plays, 21 yards, 1:37.**
- NO – Devaughn Vele 3-yard pass from Tyler Shough (Daniel Carlson kick), 1:13. Falcons 45–24. **Drive: 13 plays, 76 yards, 5:39.**

**Top passers**

- ATL – Michael Penix Jr. – 15/20, 223 yards, TD
- NO – Tyler Shough – 30/48, 286 yards, TD

**Top rushers**

- ATL – Bijan Robinson – 19 rushes, 145 yards, 2 TD
- NO – Alvin Kamara – 7 rushes, 23 yards, 2 TD

**Top receivers**

- ATL – Drake London – 5 receptions, 96 yards
- NO – Chris Olave – 8 receptions, 116 yards

The Falcons beat the Saints in their third consecutive meeting, marking their biggest win over New Orleans since 1999.

==== Week 5: vs. Baltimore Ravens ====
Week 5: Baltimore Ravens at Atlanta Falcons – Game summary

Quarter	1	2	3	4	OT	Total
**Ravens**	3	6	6	8	7	**30**
Falcons	7	7	3	6	0	**23**

at Mercedes-Benz Stadium, Atlanta, Georgia

- Date: October 11
- Game time: 8:20 p.m. EDT
- Game weather: Mostly cloudy, 64 °F (18 °C) (retractable roof open)
- Game attendance: 72,392
- Referee: Brad Allen
- TV announcers (NBC): Mike Tirico, Cris Collinsworth and Melissa Stark
- Recap, Game Book

Game information

**First quarter**

- BAL – Tyler Loop 21-yard field goal, 10:27. Ravens 3–0. **Drive: 10 plays, 62 yards, 4:33.**
- ATL – Jessie Bates 36-yard fumble return (Nick Folk kick), 8:03. Falcons 7–3. **Drive: 3 plays, 11, yards, 1:30.**

**Second quarter**

- BAL – Tyler Loop 51-yard field goal, 8:04. Falcons 7–6. **Drive: 5 plays, 20 yards, 2:31.**
- ATL – Kyle Pitts 5-yard pass from Michael Penix (Nick Folk kick), 2:24. Falcons 14–6. **Drive: 9 plays, 78 yards, 5:40.**
- BAL – Tyler Loop 51-yard field goal, 0:00. Falcons 14–9. **Drive: 11 plays, 47 yards, 2:24.**

**Third quarter**

- ATL – Nick Folk 23-yard field goal, 9:51. Falcons 17–9. **Drive: 10 plays, 60 yards, 5:09.**
- BAL – Derrick Henry 18-yard pass from Tyler Huntley (pass failed), 6:53. Falcons 17–15. **Drive: 5 plays, 74 yards, 2:58.**

**Fourth quarter**

- ATL – Nick Folk 34-yard field goal, 8:03. Falcons 20–15. **Drive: 16 plays, 74 yards, 8:26.**
- ATL – Nick Folk 48-yard field goal, 2:31. Falcons 23–15. **Drive: 10 plays, 52 yards, 3:52.**
- BAL – Devontez Walker 7-yard pass from Tyler Huntley (Derrick Henry run), 0:40. Tied 23–23. **Drive: 6 plays, 71 yards, 1:51.**

**Overtime**

- BAL – Tyler Huntley 1-yard run (Tyler Loop kick), 2:57. Ravens 30–23. **Drive: 1 play, 25 yards, 0:13.**

**Top passers**

- BAL – Tyler Huntley – 24/32, 201 yards, 2 TD
- ATL – Michael Penix – 19/32, 240 yards, TD

**Top rushers**

- BAL – Derrick Henry – 24 rushes, 102 yards
- ATL – Bijan Robinson – 17 rushes, 86 yards

**Top receivers**

- BAL – Rashod Bateman – 5 receptions, 62 yards
- ATL – Drake London – 7 reception, 118 yards

==== Week 6: vs. Chicago Bears ====
Week 6: Chicago Bears at Atlanta Falcons – Game summary

Quarter	1	2	3	4	Total
**Bears**	14	7	7	3	**31**
Falcons	0	7	0	16	**23**

at Mercedes-Benz Stadium, Atlanta, Georgia

- Date: October 18
- Game time: 1:00 p.m. EDT
- Game weather: None (retractable roof closed)
- Game attendance: 72,301
- Referee: Scott Novak
- TV announcers (Fox): Kevin Burkhardt, Tom Brady, Erin Andrews and Tom Rinaldi
- Recap, Game Book

Game information

**First quarter**

- CHI – Colston Loveland 14-yard pass from Caleb Williams (Cairo Santos kick), 8:15. Bears 7–0. **Drive: 10 plays, 67 yards, 6:45.**
- CHI – D'Andre Swift 4-yard run (Cairo Santos kick), 1:07. Bears 14–0. **Drive: 9 plays, 59 yards, 5:27.**

**Second quarter**

- ATL – Jahan Dotson 13-yard pass from Michael Penix Jr. (Nick Folk kick), 5:45. Bears 14–7. **Drive: 4 plays, 54 yards, 1:34.**
- CHI – D'Andre Swift 2-yard run (Cairo Santos kick), 1:26. Bears 21–7. **Drive: 3 plays, 10 yards, 0:17.**

**Third quarter**

- CHI – Roschon Johnson 4-yard run (Cairo Santos kick), 1:48. Bears 28–7. **Drive: 7 plays, 52 yards, 2:40.**

**Fourth quarter**

- CHI – Cairo Santos 50-yard field goal, 14:56. Bears 31–7. **Drive: 4 plays, -1 yard, 1:44.**
- ATL – Kyle Pitts 10-yard pass from Michael Penix Jr. (Michael Penix Jr.–Zachariah Branch pass), 9:34. Bears 31–15. **Drive: 8 plays, 91 yards, 2:38.**
- ATL – Kyle Pitts 5-yard pass from Michael Penix Jr. (Michael Penix Jr.–Drake London pass), 5:41. Bears 31–23. **Drive: 5 plays, 57 yards, 1:30.**

**Top passers**

- CHI – Caleb Williams – 30/36, 305 yards, TD
- ATL – Michael Penix Jr. – 19/33, 225 yards, 3 TD

**Top rushers**

- CHI – Roschon Johnson – 13 rushes, 51 yards, TD
- ATL – Bijan Robinson – 9 rushes, 61 yards

**Top receivers**

- CHI – Luther Burden III – 8 receptions, 95 yards
- ATL – Jahan Dotson – 3 receptions, 87 yards, TD

==== Week 7: vs. San Francisco 49ers ====
Week 7: San Francisco 49ers at Atlanta Falcons – Game summary

Quarter	1	2	3	4	Total
49ers	7	7	0	6	**20**
**Falcons**	3	9	7	10	**29**

at Mercedes-Benz Stadium, Atlanta, Georgia

- Date: October 25
- Game time: 1:00 p.m. EDT
- Game weather: Sunny, 68 °F (20 °C) (retractable roof open)
- Game attendance: 72,165
- Referee: Clay Martin
- TV announcers (Fox): Kenny Albert, Greg Olsen and Pam Oliver
- Recap, Game Book

Game information

**First quarter**

- SF – Christian McCaffrey 1-yard run (Eddy Pineiro kick), 9:22. 49ers 7–0. **Drive: 10 plays, 64 yards, 5:38.**
- ATL – Nick Folk 39-yard field goal, 7:06. 49ers 7–3. **Drive: 5 plays, 15 yards, 2:16.**

**Second quarter**

- SF – Kaelon Black 30-yard run (Eddy Pineiro kick), 14:54. 49ers 14–3. **Drive: 4 plays, 63 yards, 1:41.**
- ATL – Nick Muse 1-yard pass from Michael Penix Jr. (kick failed), 8:47. 49ers 14–9. **Drive: 10 plays, 68 yards, 6:07.**
- ATL – Nick Folk 33-yard field goal, 0:00. 49ers 14–12. **Drive: 14 plays, 56 yards, 4:20.**

**Third quarter**

- ATL – Kyle Pitts 5-yard pass from Michael Penix Jr. (Nick Folk kick), 8:59. Falcons 19–14. **Drive: 10 plays, 59 yards, 6:01.**

**Fourth quarter**

- ATL – Drake London 21-yard pass from Michael Penix Jr. (Nick Folk kick), 14:55. Falcons 26–14. **Drive: 11 plays, 90 yards, 5:37.**
- SF – Kyle Juszczyk 1-yard pass from Brock Purdy (kick failed), 5:05. Falcons 26–20. **Drive: 10 plays, 82 yards, 4:28.**
- ATL – Nick Folk 31-yard field goal, 1:56. Falcons 29–20. **Drive: 4 plays, 6 yards, 0:38.**

**Top passers**

- SF – Brock Purdy – 27/40, 288 yards, TD, 2 INT
- ATL – Michael Penix Jr. – 25/34, 213 yards, 3 TD

**Top rushers**

- SF – Kaelon Black – 12 rushes, 63 yards, TD
- ATL – Bijan Robinson – 20 rushes, 63 yards

**Top receivers**

- SF – George Kittle – 8 receptions, 88 yards
- ATL – Drake London – 7 receptions, 66 yards, TD

==== Week 8: at Tampa Bay Buccaneers ====
Week 8: Atlanta Falcons at Tampa Bay Buccaneers – Game summary

Quarter	1	2	3	4	Total
Falcons	0	0	0	0	**0**
**Buccaneers**	6	3	7	0	**16**

at Raymond James Stadium, Tampa, Florida

- Date: November 1
- Game time: 1:00 p.m. EST
- Game weather: Rain, 78 °F (26 °C)
- Game attendance: 61,036
- Referee: Alan Eck
- TV announcers (Fox): Mark Followill, Daryl Johnston and Allison Williams
- Recap, Game Book

Game information

**First quarter**

- TB – Chase McLaughlin 46-yard field goal, 7:43. Buccaneers 3–0. **Drive: 5 plays, 29 yards, 2:12.**
- TB – Chase McLaughlin 34-yard field goal, 4:02. Buccaneers 6–0. **Drive: 4 plays, 3 yards, 1:34.**

**Second quarter**

- TB – Chase McLaughlin 42-yard field goal, 4:04. Buccaneers 9–0. **Drive: 13 plays, 60 yards, 8:29.**

**Third quarter**

- TB – Bucky Irving 4-yard run (Chase McLaughlin kick), 3:47. Buccaneers 16–0. **Drive: 6 plays, 90 yards, 3:22.**

**Fourth quarter**

- No scoring plays

**Top passers**

- ATL – Michael Penix Jr. – 8/24, 125 yards, 4 INT
- TB – Baker Mayfield – 0/3, 0 yards

**Top rushers**

- ATL – Bijan Robinson – 19 rushes, 76 yards
- TB – Bucky Irving – 27 rushes, 170 yards, TD

**Top receivers**

- ATL – Jahan Dotson – 2 receptions, 95 yards
- TB – None

With their first shutout loss to the Buccaneers since 2004, the Falcons fell to 3–5. They also became the first team since the 1974 New York Jets to lose a game despite giving up zero pass completions.

==== Week 9: vs. Cincinnati Bengals ====
NFL Madrid Game

Week 9: Cincinnati Bengals at Atlanta Falcons – Game summary

Quarter	1	2	3	4	Total
**Bengals**	7	17	7	3	**34**
Falcons	10	0	7	0	**17**

at Santiago Bernabéu Stadium, Madrid, Spain

- Date: November 8
- Game time: 3:30 p.m. CET/9:30 a.m. EST
- Game weather: None (retractable roof closed)
- Game attendance: 78,660
- Referee: Craig Wrolstad
- TV announcers (NFLN, WANF, WLWT): Bob Wischusen, Louis Riddick and Molly McGrath
- Recap, Game Book

Game information

**First quarter**

- ATL – Charlie Woerner 1-yard pass from Michael Penix Jr. (Nick Folk kick), 11:12. Falcons 7–0. **Drive: 7 plays, 80 yards, 3:48.**
- CIN – Ja'Marr Chase 47-yard pass from Joe Burrow (Evan McPherson kick), 8:49. Tied 7–7. **Drive: 5 plays, 75 yards, 2:23.**
- ATL – Nick Folk 31-yard field goal, 2:56. Falcons 10–7. **Drive: 11 plays, 47 yards, 5:53.**

**Second quarter**

- CIN – Joe Burrow 1-yard run (Evan McPherson kick), 12:56. Bengals 14–10. **Drive: 11 plays, 70 yards, 5:00.**
- CIN – Tee Higgins 4-yard pass from Joe Burrow (Evan McPherson kick), 4:03. Bengals 21–10. **Drive: 10 plays, 88 yards, 6:43.**
- CIN – Evan McPherson 57-yard field goal, 0:24. Bengals 24–10. **Drive: 5 plays, 45 yards, 0:33.**

**Third quarter**

- ATL – Bijan Robinson 1-yard run (Nick Folk kick), 6:18. Bengals 24–17. **Drive: 11 plays, 76 yards, 7:02.**
- CIN – Tee Higgins 8-yard pass from Joe Burrow (Evan McPherson kick), 2:05. Bengals 31–17. **Drive: 7 plays, 73 yards, 4:13.**

**Fourth quarter**

- CIN – Evan McPherson 43-yard field goal, 4:36. Bengals 34–17. **Drive: 7 plays, 23 yards, 3:15.**

**Top passers**

- CIN – Joe Burrow – 24/29, 271 yards, 3 TD
- ATL – Michael Penix Jr. – 20/31, 162 yards, TD, INT

**Top rushers**

- CIN – Chase Brown – 9 rushes, 57 yards
- ATL – Bijan Robinson – 19 rushes, 100 yards, TD

**Top receivers**

- CIN – Ja'Marr Chase – 10 receptions, 155 yards, TD
- ATL – Drake London – 5 receptions, 68 yards

==== Week 10: vs. Kansas City Chiefs ====
Week 10: Kansas City Chiefs at Atlanta Falcons – Game summary

Quarter	1	2	3	4	Total
**Chiefs**	7	7	7	14	**35**
Falcons	0	3	0	10	**13**

at Mercedes-Benz Stadium, Atlanta, Georgia

- Date: November 15
- Game time: 1:00 p.m. EST
- Game weather: None (retractable roof closed)
- Game attendance: 72,045
- Referee: Alan Eck
- TV announcers (CBS): Jim Nantz, J. J. Watt and Tracy Wolfson
- Recap, Game Book

Game information

**First quarter**

- KC – Emmett Johnson 12-yard pass from Patrick Mahomes (Harrison Butker kick), 8:53. Chiefs 7–0. **Drive: 10 plays, 80 yards, 5:03.**

**Second quarter**

- ATL – Jake Moody 28-yard field goal, 7:12. Chiefs 7–3. **Drive: 9 plays, 42 yards, 6:16.**
- KC – Josh Downs 18-yard pass from Patrick Mahomes (Harrison Butker kick), 0:18. Chiefs 14–3. **Drive: 7 plays, 79 yards, 1:56.**

**Third quarter**

- KC – Cyrus Allen 39-yard pass from Patrick Mahomes (Harrison Butker kick), 5:02. Chiefs 21–3. **Drive: 4 plays, 50 yards, 1:52.**

**Fourth quarter**

- KC – Emmett Johnson 6-yard pass from Patrick Mahomes (Harrison Butker kick), 9:55. Chiefs 28–3. **Drive: 8 plays, 87 yards, 3:47.**
- ATL – Bijan Robinson 3-yard run (Jake Moody kick), 8:12. Chiefs 28–10. **Drive: 6 plays, 73 yards, 1:43.**
- ATL – Jake Moody 38-yard field goal, 6:45. Chiefs 28–13. **Drive: 5 plays, 30 yards, 1:27.**
- KC – Andrew Armstrong 43-yard pass from Patrick Mahomes (Harrison Butker kick), 4:18. Chiefs 35–13. **Drive: 5 plays, 75 yards, 2:27.**

**Top passers**

- KC – Patrick Mahomes – 22/35, 348 yards, 5 TD
- ATL – Michael Penix Jr. – 23/43, 286 yards, INT

**Top rushers**

- KC – Emmett Johnson – 22 rushes, 101 yards
- ATL – Bijan Robinson – 16 rushes, 71 yards, TD

**Top receivers**

- KC – Rashee Rice – 5 receptions, 82 yards
- ATL – Drake London – 6 receptions, 109 yards

==== Week 12: at Minnesota Vikings ====
Week 12: Atlanta Falcons at Minnesota Vikings – Game summary

Quarter	1	2	3	4	Total
Falcons	0	0	0	0	**0**
Vikings	0	0	0	0	**0**

at U.S. Bank Stadium, Minneapolis, Minnesota

- Date: November 29
- Game time: 1:00 p.m. EST/12:00 p.m. CST
- Game weather: None (indoor stadium)
- TV announcers (Fox): Joe Davis, Greg Olsen and Pam Oliver
- Preview

=== Standings ===
==== Division ====
NFC South
	W	L	T	PCT	DIV	CONF	PF	PA	STK
Carolina Panthers	5	5	0	.500	2–1	4–3	254	269	W2
Tampa Bay Buccaneers	3	7	0	.300	2–0	3–4	223	209	L2
Atlanta Falcons	3	7	0	.300	1–2	3–3	201	258	L3
New Orleans Saints	3	7	0	.300	0–2	1–5	215	257	L2

==== Conference ====
NFC
Seed	Team	Division	W	L	T	PCT	DIV	CONF	SOS	SOV	STK
**Division leaders**
1	San Francisco 49ers	West	8	1	0	.889	3–0	5–1	.428	.444	W2
2 (Note: Detroit wins tie break over Chicago based on division record.)	Detroit Lions	North	8	2	0	.800	2–0	5–1	.440	.375	W6
3	New York Giants	East	5	3	1	.611	2–1–1	3–3–1	.356	.308	L1
4	Carolina Panthers	South	5	5	0	.500	2–1	4–3	.510	.412	W2
**Wild cards**
5	Chicago Bears	North	8	2	0	.800	0–2	6–2	.434	.375	W5
6	Minnesota Vikings	North	7	2	0	.778	3–1	5–1	.516	.423	W1
7 (Note: Green Bay wins tie break over Seattle based on conference record. Division tie break was initially used to eliminate LA Rams (see below).)	Green Bay Packers	North	6	4	0	.600	1–3	4–4	.535	.459	L1
**In the hunt**
8 (Note: Seattle wins tie break over LA Rams based on division record.)	Seattle Seahawks	West	6	4	0	.600	2–1	2–3	.515	.393	W2
9	Los Angeles Rams	West	6	4	0	.600	1–2	4–2	.485	.345	W4
10	Dallas Cowboys	East	5	6	0	.455	2–1	2–5	.400	.290	W1
11	Washington Commanders	East	3	5	1	.389	2–2–1	3–4–1	.506	.500	W1
12 (Note: Tampa Bay wins tie break over Philadelphia based on conference record. Division tie break was initially to eliminate Atlanta and New Orleans (see below).) (Note: Tampa Bay wins tie break over Atlanta and New Orleans based on head-to-head record.)	Tampa Bay Buccaneers	South	3	7	0	.300	2–0	3–4	.616	.419	L2
13 (Note: Atlanta wins tie break over Philadephia based on conference record. Division tie break was initially to eliminate New Orleans (see below).) (Note: Atlanta wins tie break over New Orleans based on head-to-head victory.)	Atlanta Falcons	South	3	7	0	.300	1–2	3–3	.586	.586	L3
14 (Note: New Orleans wins tie break over Philadelphia based on conference record.)	New Orleans Saints	South	3	7	0	.300	0–2	1–5	.571	.517	L2
15	Philadelphia Eagles	East	3	7	0	.300	1–3	1–6	.521	.362	W1
16	Arizona Cardinals	West	3	8	0	.273	1–4	2–6	.621	.400	L3
