= Justin Hood =

Justin Hood may refer to:

- Justin Hood (coach), American football coach
- Justin Hood (darts player), British darts player
