= 2025 Atlanta Falcons season =

60th season in franchise history

- Owner: Arthur Blank
- General manager: Terry Fontenot
- Head coach: Raheem Morris
- Home stadium: Mercedes-Benz Stadium

Results
- Record: 8–9
- Division place: 3rd NFC South
- Playoffs: Did not qualify
- All-Pros: RB Bijan Robinson (1st team) (2nd team) (Note: Selected as a All-purpose on 2nd team); FS Jessie Bates (2nd team); OG Chris Lindstrom (2nd team); TE Kyle Pitts (2nd team)
- Pro Bowlers: OG Chris Lindstrom; RB Bijan Robinson

Uniform
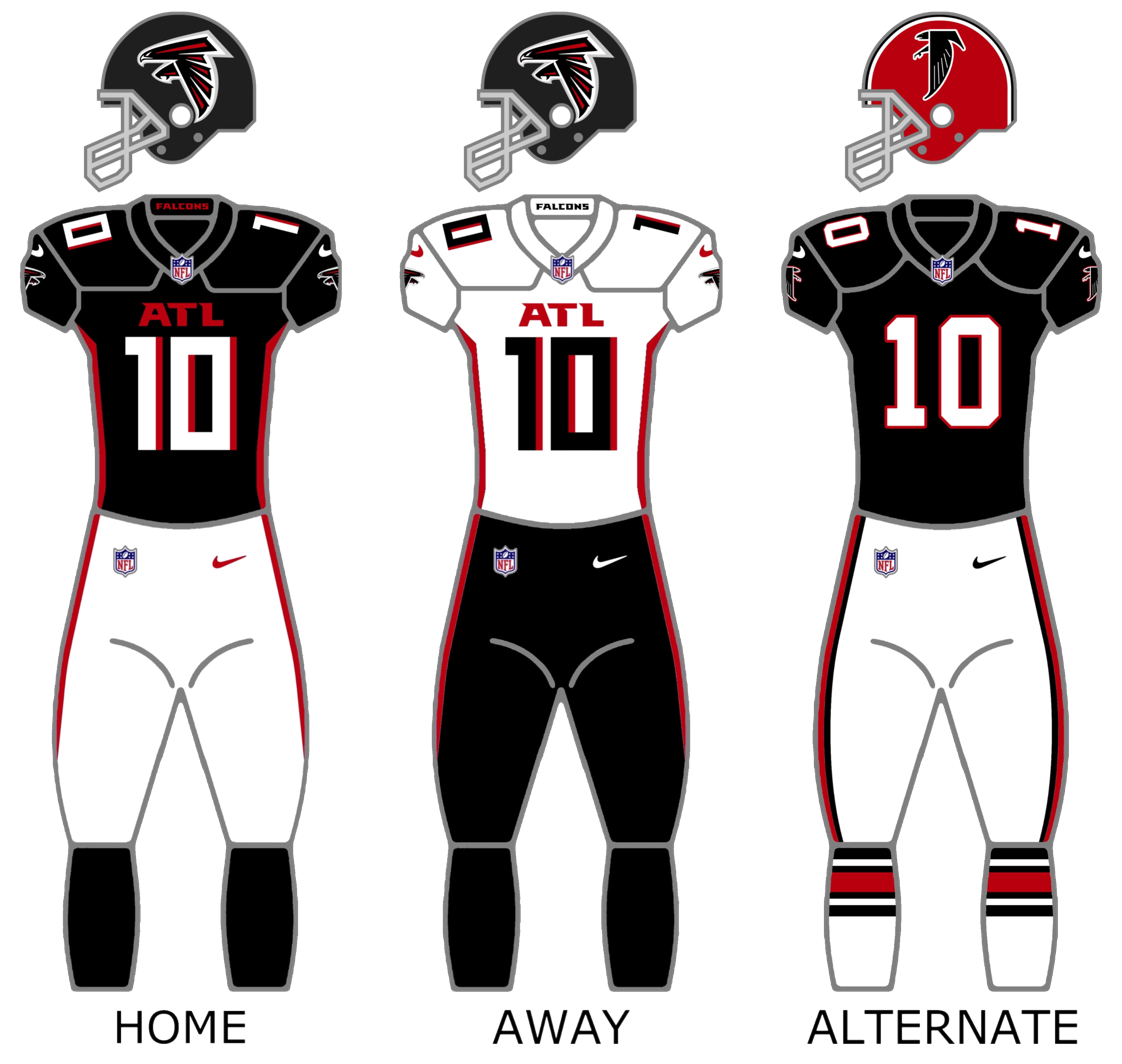

The 2025 season was the Atlanta Falcons' 60th in the National Football League (NFL), their ninth playing their home games at Mercedes-Benz Stadium, their fifth and final under the leadership of general manager Terry Fontenot and their second and final under head coach Raheem Morris.

Despite a 3–2 start, the Falcons lost seven of their next eight games. They failed to improve on their 8–9 record from the previous season and missed the playoffs for the 8th consecutive season after a Week 14 loss to the eventual Super Bowl LX champion Seattle Seahawks. Their 4–9 start was their worst since they also started 4–9 in 2020, and even though they won their last four games, that was not enough to overcome the slow start.

Ironically, their matchup versus the New Orleans Saints in the regular season finale determined the NFC South champion, with Atlanta’s victory creating a three-way tie favorable to Carolina. Had the Falcons lost, Tampa Bay would have won the division instead. Carolina’s playoff appearance also gave the Falcons sole possession of the longest active playoff drought in the conference, which currently stands at eight seasons.

Hours following their Week 18 win over New Orleans, both head coach Raheem Morris and general manager Terry Fontenot were relieved of their duties in Atlanta. A day later, owner Arthur Blank promoted Greg Beadles to CEO of the Atlanta Falcons, effectively replacing Rich McKay.

The Atlanta Falcons drew an average home attendance of 70,995, the 10th-highest of all NFL teams.

== Draft ==
2025 Atlanta Falcons draft selections
Round	Selection	Player	Position	College	Notes
1	15	Jalon Walker	DE	Georgia	
1	26	James Pearce Jr.	DE	Tennessee	From Rams (Note: The Falcons traded a second-round selection (46th overall), a seventh round selection (242nd overall) and a 2026 first round selection in exchange for the 26th overall pick and a third round selection (101st overall))
2	46	Traded to the Los Angeles Rams			
3	77	Traded to the New England Patriots (Note: The Falcons traded a third-round selection (77th overall) to the New England Patriots in exchange for LB Matthew Judon.)			
3	96	Xavier Watts	S	Notre Dame	From Eagles
3	101	Traded to the Philadelphia Eagles			From Rams
4	118	Billy Bowman	S	Oklahoma	
5	—	Selection forfeited (Note: The Falcons forfeited their fifth-round selection as punishment for "improper contact" with QB Kirk Cousins, WR Darnell Mooney and TE Charlie Woerner in violation of the league's anti-tampering policy.)			
6	190	Traded to the Los Angeles Rams (Note: The Falcons traded a sixth-round selection (190th overall) to the Los Angeles Rams in exchange for a seventh-round selection (242nd overall) and WR Van Jefferson.)			
7	218	Jack Nelson	OT	Wisconsin	From Browns via Chargers (Note: The Falcons traded QB Taylor Heinicke to the Los Angeles Chargers in exchange for a conditional seventh-round selection (218th overall).)
7	229	Traded to the Philadelphia Eagles (Note: The Falcons traded a seventh-round selection (229th overall) to the Philadelphia Eagles in exchange for DE Kentavius Street.)			
7	242	Traded to the Los Angeles Rams			From Rams

2025 Atlanta Falcons undrafted free agents
Name	Position	College	Ref.
Simeon Barrow Jr.	DL	Miami (FL)	
Cobee Bryant	CB	Kansas	
Nate Carter	RB	Michigan State	
Joshua Gray	OL	Oregon State	
Nick Kubitz	LB	North Dakota State	
Dontae Manning	CB	Oregon	
Nick Nash	WR	San Jose State	
Joshua Simon	TE	South Carolina	
Quincy Skinner Jr.	WR	Vanderbilt	
Malik Verdon	LB	Iowa State	
Jordan Williams	OT	Georgia Tech	

Draft trades

== Staff ==
2025 Atlanta Falcons staff
Front office: Owner/chairman – Arthur Blank; President/CEO – Greg Beadles; General manager – Terry Fontenot; Assistant general manager – Kyle Smith; Vice president of football operations/player personnel – Ryan Pace; Director of college scouting – Adetokunbo Abanikanda; Assistant director of college scouting – Michael Ross; Director of coaching operations – Brian Griffin; Senior director of football administration – Chris Olsen; Senior personnel executive – Ruston Webster; Head coaches: Head coach – Raheem Morris; Assistant head coach/defense – Jerry Gray; Offensive coaches: Offensive coordinator – Zac Robinson; Wide receivers/pass game coordinator – T. J. Yates; Quarterbacks – D. J. Williams; Running backs – Michael Pitre; Tight ends – Kevin Koger; Run game coordinator/offensive line – Dwayne Ledford; Assistant offensive line – Shawn Flaherty; Assistant offensive line – Nick Jones; Senior offensive assistant – Ken Zampese; Offensive assistant – K.J. Black; Offensive assistant – Patrick Kramer; Pass game specialist/game management – Tim Berbenich	Defensive coaches: Defensive coordinator – Jeff Ulbrich; Defensive passing game coordinator – Mike Rutenberg; Defensive line – Nate Ollie; Inside linebackers – Barrett Ruud; Outside linebackers – Jacquies Smith; Secondary – Justin Hood; Senior defensive assistant – Dave Huxtable; Defensive assistant – Lance Schulters; Defensive assistant – John Timu; Special teams coaches: Special teams coordinator – Marquice Williams; Assistant special teams – Steven King; Strength and conditioning: Director of Player Performance – John Griffin; Assistant director of strength & conditioning – Paul Constantine; Assistant director of strength & conditioning – Erik Jernstrom; Assistant director of strength & conditioning – Josh Nelson

== Final roster ==
2025 Atlanta Falcons roster
Quarterbacks (QB): 18 Kirk Cousins; 12 Easton Stick; Running backs (RB): 25 Tyler Allgeier; 38 Nate Carter; 7 Bijan Robinson; Wide receivers (WR): 81 Dylan Drummond; 86 Malik Heath; 5 Drake London; 1 Darnell Mooney; 87 David Sills; 83 Deven Thompkins; 82 Casey Washington; Tight ends (TE): 84 Feleipe Franks; 8 Kyle Pitts; 85 Teagan Quitoriano; 89 Charlie Woerner	Offensive linemen (OL): 65 Matthew Bergeron G; 52 Jovaughn Gwyn C; 68 Kyle Hinton G; 72 Michael Jerrell T; 63 Chris Lindstrom G; 70 Jake Matthews T; 69 Jack Nelson T; 64 Ryan Neuzil C; 71 Elijah Wilkinson T; Defensive linemen (DL): 54 Brandon Dorlus DE; 91 Elijah Garcia DE; 94 LaCale London DE; 90 David Onyemata NT; 98 Ruke Orhorhoro DE; 93 Kentavius Street NT	Linebackers (LB): 40 JD Bertrand ILB; 0 Divine Deablo ILB; 17 Arnold Ebiketie OLB; 55 Kaden Elliss ILB; 56 Leonard Floyd OLB; 36 Ronnie Harrison ILB; 92 Khalid Kareem OLB; 27 James Pearce Jr. OLB; 11 Jalon Walker OLB; 42 Josh Woods ILB; Defensive backs (DB): 20 Dee Alford CB; 3 Jessie Bates FS; 35 Natrone Brooks CB; 37 Cobee Bryant CB; 28 Mike Ford CB; 39 C. J. Henderson CB; 34 Jammie Robinson FS; 24 A. J. Terrell CB; 31 Xavier Watts SS; Special teams (ST): 45 Zane Gonzalez K; 49 Liam McCullough LS; 13 Bradley Pinion P	Practice squad: 53 Eugene Asante ILB; 19 Chris Blair WR; 29 Jordan Fuller SS; 32 Trenton Gill P; 67 Joshua Gray G; 71 Ryan Hayes T (PS/I); 79 Patrick Jenkins DE; 41 Tysheem Johnson FS; 46 Lenny Krieg K (IPP); 80 Nick Nash WR; 88 K. J. Osborn WR; 47 Joshua Simon TE; 95 Ben Stille DE; 62 Andrew Stueber T; 16 Kyle Trask QB; 66 Carter Warren T; 28 Carlos Washington Jr. RB; 30 A. J. Woods CB; Reserve: 44 Troy Andersen ILB (PUP); 33 Billy Bowman Jr. CB (IR); 96 Zach Harrison DE (IR); 23 DeMarcco Hellams SS (IR/DFR); 12 KhaDarel Hodge WR (IR); 21 Mike Hughes CB (IR); 15 Emory Jones QB (IR); 51 DeAngelo Malone OLB (IR); 76 Kaleb McGary T (IR); 77 Storm Norton T (IR); 9 Michael Penix Jr. QB (IR); 22 Clark Phillips III CB (IR); 99 Sam Roberts DT (IR); 49 Bralen Trice OLB (IR); 43 Malik Verdon ILB (NF-Inj.); 74 Tyrone Wheatley Jr. T (IR); Rookies in italics 53 active, 16 reserve, 17 practice squad (1 exempt)

== Preseason ==
Week	Date	Opponent	Result	Record	Venue	Recap
1	August 8 (Note: Due to an injury involving Morice Norris, the game was suspended with over 6 minutes to go in the fourth quarter. The game was officially recorded as having been suspended with almost 15 minutes left in the quarter.)	Detroit Lions	L 10–17	0–1	Mercedes-Benz Stadium	Recap
2	August 15	Tennessee Titans	L 20–23	0–2	Mercedes-Benz Stadium	Recap
3	August 22	at Dallas Cowboys	L 13–31	0–3	AT&T Stadium	Recap

== Regular season ==
=== Schedule ===
Week	Date	Opponent	Result	Record	Venue	Recap
1	September 7	**Tampa Bay Buccaneers**	**L** 20–23	0–1	Mercedes-Benz Stadium	Recap
2	September 14	at Minnesota Vikings	**W** 22–6	1–1	U.S. Bank Stadium	Recap
3	September 21	at **Carolina Panthers**	**L** 0–30	1–2	Bank of America Stadium	Recap
4	September 28	Washington Commanders	**W** 34–27	2–2	Mercedes-Benz Stadium	Recap
5	Bye					
6	October 13	Buffalo Bills	**W** 24–14	3–2	Mercedes-Benz Stadium	Recap
7	October 19	at San Francisco 49ers	**L** 10–20	3–3	Levi's Stadium	Recap
8	October 26	Miami Dolphins	**L** 10–34	3–4	Mercedes-Benz Stadium	Recap
9	November 2	at New England Patriots	**L** 23–24	3–5	Gillette Stadium	Recap
10	November 9	at Indianapolis Colts	**L** 25–31 (OT)	3–6	(Germany) Olympiastadion (Berlin)	Recap
11	November 16	**Carolina Panthers**	**L** 27–30 (OT)	3–7	Mercedes-Benz Stadium	Recap
12	November 23	at **New Orleans Saints**	**W** 24–10	4–7	Caesars Superdome	Recap
13	November 30	at New York Jets	**L** 24–27	4–8	MetLife Stadium	Recap
14	December 7	Seattle Seahawks	**L** 9–37	4–9	Mercedes-Benz Stadium	Recap
15	December 11	at **Tampa Bay Buccaneers**	**W** 29–28	5–9	Raymond James Stadium	Recap
16	December 21	at Arizona Cardinals	**W** 26–19	6–9	State Farm Stadium	Recap
17	December 29	Los Angeles Rams	**W** 27–24	7–9	Mercedes-Benz Stadium	Recap
18	January 4	**New Orleans Saints**	**W** 19–17	8–9	Mercedes-Benz Stadium	Recap

Note: Intra-division opponents are in bold text.

=== Game summaries ===
==== Week 1: vs. Tampa Bay Buccaneers ====
Week 1: Tampa Bay Buccaneers at Atlanta Falcons – Game summary

Quarter	1	2	3	4	Total
**Buccaneers**	0	10	7	6	**23**
Falcons	7	3	3	7	**20**

at Mercedes-Benz Stadium, Atlanta, Georgia

- Date: September 7
- Game time: 1:00 p.m. EDT
- Game weather: None (retractable roof closed)
- Game attendance: 71,610
- Referee: Land Clark
- TV announcers (Fox): Kenny Albert, Jonathan Vilma and Megan Olivi
- Recap, Game Book

Game information

**First quarter**

- ATL – Bijan Robinson 50-yard pass from Michael Penix Jr. (Younghoe Koo kick), 13:14. Falcons 7–0. **Drive: 3 plays, 65 yards, 1:46.**

**Second quarter**

- TB – Chase McLaughlin 48-yard field goal, 10:17. Falcons 7–3. **Drive: 16 plays, 61 yards, 8:07.**
- TB – Emeka Egbuka 30-yard pass from Baker Mayfield (Chase McLaughlin kick), 6:53. Buccaneers 10–7. **Drive: 5 plays, 52 yards, 2:04.**
- ATL – Younghoe Koo 41-yard field goal, 0:53. Tied 10–10. **Drive: 13 plays, 48 yards, 6:00.**

**Third quarter**

- TB – Bucky Irving 9-yard pass from Baker Mayfield (Chase McLaughlin kick), 7:26. Buccaneers 17–10. **Drive: 5 plays, 32 yards, 2:13.**
- ATL – Younghoe Koo 36-yard field goal, 0:20. Buccaneers 17–13. **Drive: 11 plays, 53 yards, 7:06.**

**Fourth quarter**

- ATL – Michael Penix Jr. 4-yard run (Younghoe Koo kick), 2:17. Falcons 20–17. **Drive: 18 plays, 91 yards, 8:46.**
- TB – Emeka Egbuka 25-yard pass from Baker Mayfield (kick failed), 0:59. Buccaneers 23–20. **Drive: 5 plays, 63 yards, 1:18.**

**Top passers**

- TB – Baker Mayfield – 17/32, 167 yards, 3 TD
- ATL – Michael Penix Jr. – 27/42, 298 yards, TD

**Top rushers**

- TB – Baker Mayfield – 5 rushes, 39 yards
- ATL – Tyler Allgeier – 10 rushes, 24 yards

**Top receivers**

- TB – Emeka Egbuka – 4 receptions, 67 yards, 2 TD
- ATL – Bijan Robinson – 6 receptions, 100 yards, TD

The Falcons open up their 60th season with a 23–20 loss to Tampa Bay, their first loss to the Bucs since 2023. It was mostly notable for a missed game winning field goal by Younghoe Koo, who would be subsequently released a few days after the game. Atlanta dropped to 0–1 as a result.

==== Week 2: at Minnesota Vikings ====
Week 2: Atlanta Falcons at Minnesota Vikings – Game summary

Quarter	1	2	3	4	Total
**Falcons**	6	3	3	10	**22**
Vikings	0	6	0	0	**6**

at U.S. Bank Stadium, Minneapolis, Minnesota

- Date: September 14
- Game time: 8:20 p.m. EDT/7:20 p.m. CDT
- Game weather: None (indoor stadium)
- Game attendance: 66,859
- Referee: Adrian Hill
- TV announcers (NBC): Mike Tirico, Cris Collinsworth and Melissa Stark
- Recap, Game Book

Game information

**First quarter**

- ATL – Parker Romo 38-yard field goal, 11:12. Falcons 3–0. **Drive: 6 plays, 45 yards, 3:48.**
- ATL – Parker Romo 29-yard field goal, 6:48. Falcons 6–0. **Drive: 7 plays, 26 yards, 2:30.**

**Second quarter**

- MIN – Will Reichard 33-yard field goal, 7:06. Falcons 6–3. **Drive: 17 plays, 53 yards, 9:22.**
- ATL – Parker Romo 33-yard field goal, 0:25. Falcons 9–3. **Drive: 7 plays, 23 yards, 1:38.**
- MIN – Will Reichard 51-yard field goal, 0:00. Falcons 9–6. **Drive: 3 plays, 47 yards, 0:25.**

**Third quarter**

- ATL — Parker Romo 33-yard field goal, 6:17. Falcons 12–6. **Drive: 13 plays, 64 yards, 7:47.**

**Fourth quarter**

- ATL – Parker Romo 54-yard field goal, 11:16. Falcons 15–6. **Drive: 6 plays, 2 yards, 3:39.**
- ATL – Tyler Allgeier 5-yard rush (Parker Romo kick), 3:22. Falcons 22–6. **Drive: 12 plays, 83 yards, 6:17.**

**Top passers**

- ATL – Michael Penix Jr. – 13/21, 135 yards
- MIN – J. J. McCarthy – 11/21, 158 yards, 2 INT

**Top rushers**

- ATL – Bijan Robinson – 22 rushes, 143 yards
- MIN – Jordan Mason – 9 rushes, 30 yards

**Top receivers**

- ATL – Drake London – 3 receptions, 49 yards
- MIN – Justin Jefferson – 3 receptions, 81 yards

The Falcons rebounded from their Week 1 loss with a strong defensive performance against Minnesota, thus improving their record to 1–1.

==== Week 3: at Carolina Panthers ====
Week 3: Atlanta Falcons at Carolina Panthers – Game summary

Quarter	1	2	3	4	Total
Falcons	0	0	0	0	**0**
**Panthers**	7	3	10	10	**30**

at Bank of America Stadium, Charlotte, North Carolina

- Date: September 21
- Game time: 1:00 p.m. EDT
- Game weather: Sunny, 84 °F (29 °C)
- Game attendance: 71,129
- Referee: Craig Wrolstad
- TV announcers (Fox): Alex Faust, Matt Millen and Sarah Kustok
- Recap, Game Book

Game information

**First quarter**

- CAR – Bryce Young 4-yard run (Ryan Fitzgerald kick), 6:44. Panthers 7–0. **Drive: 9 plays, 61 yards, 4:06.**

**Second quarter**

- CAR – Ryan Fitzgerald 57-yard field goal, 5:24. Panthers 10–0. **Drive: 10 plays, 48 yards, 5:21.**

**Third quarter**

- CAR – Chau Smith-Wade 11-yard interception return (Ryan Fitzgerald kick), 11:39. Panthers 17–0.
- CAR – Ryan Fitzgerald 35-yard field goal, 4:48. Panthers 20–0. **Drive: 9 plays, 28 yards, 4:36.**

**Fourth quarter**

- CAR – Rico Dowdle 1-yard run (Ryan Fitzgerald kick), 10:48. Panthers 27–0. **Drive: 9 plays, 30 yards, 5:29.**
- CAR – Ryan Fitzgerald 41-yard field goal, 3:41. Panthers 30–0. **Drive: 7 plays, 21 yards, 4:21.**

**Top passers**

- ATL – Michael Penix Jr. – 18/36, 172 yards, INT
- CAR – Bryce Young – 16/24, 121 yards

**Top rushers**

- ATL – Bijan Robinson – 13 rushes, 72 yards
- CAR – Chuba Hubbard – 17 rushes, 73 yards

**Top receivers**

- ATL – Drake London – 5 receptions, 55 yards
- CAR – Tetairoa McMillan – 3 receptions, 48 yards

The Falcons were shutout for the first time since the 2021 season, with a 0–30 loss to Carolina. They fall to 1–2.

==== Week 4: vs. Washington Commanders ====
Week 4: Washington Commanders at Atlanta Falcons – Game summary

Quarter	1	2	3	4	Total
Commanders	0	10	6	11	**27**
**Falcons**	10	7	14	3	**34**

at Mercedes-Benz Stadium, Atlanta, Georgia

- Date: September 28
- Game time: 1:00 p.m. EDT
- Game weather: None (retractable roof closed)
- Game attendance: 71,492
- Referee: Scott Novak
- TV announcers (CBS): Ian Eagle, J. J. Watt and Evan Washburn
- Recap, Game Book

Game information

**First quarter**

- ATL – Parker Romo 38-yard field goal, 10:46. Falcons 3–0. **Drive: 9 plays, 45 yards, 4:14.**
- ATL – Drake London 5-yard pass from Michael Penix Jr. (Parker Romo kick), 0:49. Falcons 10–0. **Drive: 14 plays, 73 yards, 8:13.**

**Second quarter**

- WAS – Luke McCaffrey 5-yard pass from Marcus Mariota (Matt Gay kick), 11:31. Falcons 10–7. **Drive: 8 plays, 70 yards, 4:18.**
- ATL – Bijan Robinson 14-yard rush (Parker Romo kick), 8:27. Falcons 17–7. **Drive: 5 plays, 63 yards, 3:04.**
- WAS – Matt Gay 43-yard field goal, 5:24. Falcons 17–10. **Drive: 6 plays, 16 yards, 3:03.**

**Third quarter**

- WAS – Matt Gay 52-yard field goal, 10:12. Falcons 17–13. **Drive: 8 plays, 37 yards, 4:48.**
- ATL – Kyle Pitts 7-yard pass from Michael Penix Jr. (Parker Romo kick), 9:25. Falcons 24–13. **Drive: 2 plays, 76 yards, 0:47.**
- WAS – Matt Gay 41-yard field goal, 4:22. Falcons 24–16. **Drive: 4 plays, 2 yards, 0:51.**
- ATL – Tyler Allgeier 15-yard rush (Parker Romo kick), 0:14. Falcons 31–16. **Drive: 7 plays, 72 yards, 4:08.**

**Fourth quarter**

- WAS – Deebo Samuel 24-yard pass from Marcus Mariota (Zach Ertz pass from Marcus Mariota), 8:48. Falcons 31–24. **Drive: 11 plays, 76 yards, 6:26.**
- ATL – Parker Romo 26-yard field goal, 1:57. Falcons 34–24. **Drive: 14 plays, 69 yards, 6:51.**
- WAS – Matt Gay 42-yard field goal, 1:29. Falcons 34–27. **Drive: 4 plays, 41 yards, 0:28.**

**Top passers**

- WAS – Marcus Mariota – 16/27, 156 yards, 2 TD, INT
- ATL – Michael Penix Jr. – 20/26, 313 yards, 2 TD, INT

**Top rushers**

- WAS – Chris Rodriguez Jr. – 7 rushes, 59 yards
- ATL – Bijan Robinson – 17 rushes, 75 yards, TD

**Top receivers**

- WAS – Deebo Samuel – 6 receptions, 72 yards, TD
- ATL – Drake London – 8 receptions, 110 yards, TD

The Falcons rebounded from their dismal performance against Carolina with a 34–27 win over Washington, their first win over the Commanders since 2018, snapping a four-game head-to-head losing streak. With the win, Atlanta entered their bye week at 2–2.

==== Week 6: vs. Buffalo Bills ====
Week 6: Buffalo Bills at Atlanta Falcons – Game summary

Quarter	1	2	3	4	Total
Bills	7	0	7	0	**14**
**Falcons**	14	7	0	3	**24**

at Mercedes-Benz Stadium, Atlanta, Georgia

- Date: October 13
- Game time: 7:15 p.m. EDT
- Game weather: Sunny, 75 °F (24 °C) (retractable roof open)
- Game attendance: 72,067
- Referee: Shawn Smith
- TV announcers (WUPA, WGRZ, ESPN): Chris Fowler, Dan Orlovsky, Louis Riddick, Katie George and Peter Schrager
  Game exclusive to WUPA and WGRZ through syndication. Out of market on ESPN.
- Recap, Game Book

Game information

**First quarter**

- ATL – Tyler Allgeier 21-yard run (Parker Romo kick), 12:15. Falcons 7–0. **Drive: 5 plays, 69 yards, 2:45.**
- BUF – Dawson Knox 19-yard pass from Josh Allen (Matt Prater kick), 8:01. Tied 7–7. **Drive: 6 plays, 73 yards, 4:14.**
- ATL – Drake London 9-yard pass from Michael Penix Jr. (Parker Romo kick), 0:26. Falcons 14–7. **Drive: 9 plays, 66 yards, 4:59.**

**Second quarter**

- ATL – Bijan Robinson 81-yard run (Parker Romo kick), 11:09. Falcons 21–7. **Drive: 1 play, 86 yards, 0:42.**

**Third quarter**

- BUF – Ray Davis 16-yard pass from Josh Allen (Matt Prater kick), 9:23. Falcons 21–14. **Drive: 9 plays, 73 yards, 5:37.**

**Fourth quarter**

- ATL – Parker Romo 33-yard field goal, 1:43. Falcons 24–14. **Drive: 14 plays, 68 yards, 5:00.**

**Top passers**

- BUF – Josh Allen – 15/26, 180 yards, 2 TD, 2 INT
- ATL – Michael Penix Jr. – 20/32, 250 yards, TD

**Top rushers**

- BUF – James Cook – 17 rushes, 87 yards
- ATL – Bijan Robinson – 19 rushes, 170 yards, TD

**Top receivers**

- BUF – Josh Palmer – 2 receptions, 60 yards
- ATL – Drake London – 10 receptions, 158 yards, TD

The game marked the Falcons' first Monday night home appearance since 2018. Running back Bijan Robinson delivered a career-best performance, rushing for 170 yards on 19 carries and adding six receptions for 68 yards, totaling 238 yards from scrimmage. His night included an 81-yard touchdown run, the longest run of the season so far. The Falcons defeated the Bills and improved to 3–2.

==== Week 7: at San Francisco 49ers ====
Week 7: Atlanta Falcons at San Francisco 49ers – Game summary

Quarter	1	2	3	4	Total
Falcons	0	3	7	0	**10**
**49ers**	0	10	3	7	**20**

at Levi's Stadium, Santa Clara, California

- Date: October 19
- Game time: 8:20 p.m. EDT/5:20 p.m. PDT
- Game weather: Sunny, 74 °F (23 °C)
- Game attendance: 71,217
- Referee: Ron Torbert
- TV announcers (NBC): Mike Tirico, Cris Collinsworth and Melissa Stark
- Recap, Game Book

Game information

**First quarter**

- No scoring plays

**Second quarter**

- ATL – Parker Romo 38-yard field goal, 12:54. Falcons 3–0. **Drive: 19 plays, 60 yards, 10:40.**
- SF – Christian McCaffrey 1-yard run (Eddy Pineiro kick), 1:48. 49ers 7–3. **Drive: 13 plays, 80 yards, 6:10.**
- SF – Eddy Pineiro 55-yard field goal, 0:38. 49ers 10–3. **Drive: 4 plays, 3 yards, 0:50.**

**Third quarter**

- SF – Eddy Pineiro 43-yard field goal, 10:09. 49ers 13–3. **Drive: 11 plays, 43 yards, 4:51.**
- ATL – Bijan Robinson 10-yard pass from Michael Penix Jr. (Parker Romo kick), 6:28. 49ers 13–10. **Drive: 6 plays, 48 yards, 3:41.**

**Fourth quarter**

- SF – Christian McCaffrey 4-yard run (Eddy Pineiro kick), 2:26. 49ers 20–10. **Drive: 11 plays, 64 yards, 5:50.**

**Top passers**

- ATL – Michael Penix Jr. – 21/38, 241 yards, TD
- SF – Mac Jones – 17/26, 152 yards, INT

**Top rushers**

- ATL – Bijan Robinson – 14 rushes, 40 yards
- SF – Christian McCaffrey – 24 rushes, 129 yards, 2 TD

**Top receivers**

- ATL – Darnell Mooney – 3 receptions, 68 yards
- SF – Christian McCaffrey – 7 receptions, 72 yards

The 49ers proved to be too dominant for the Falcons, as they would win by ten points. This game snapped the Falcons' 2-game winning streak, dropping them to 3–3.

==== Week 8: vs. Miami Dolphins ====
Week 8: Miami Dolphins at Atlanta Falcons – Game summary

Quarter	1	2	3	4	Total
**Dolphins**	7	10	7	10	**34**
Falcons	0	3	0	7	**10**

at Mercedes-Benz Stadium, Atlanta, Georgia

- Date: October 26
- Game time: 1:00 p.m. EDT
- Game weather: None (retractable roof closed)
- Game attendance: 71,344
- Referee: John Hussey
- TV announcers (CBS): Kevin Harlan, Trent Green and Melanie Collins
- Recap, Game Book

Game information

**First quarter**

- MIA – De'Von Achane 3-yard pass from Tua Tagovailoa (Riley Patterson kick), 2:33. Dolphins 7–0. **Drive: 13 plays, 79 yards, 8:33.**

**Second quarter**

- ATL – Parker Romo 45-yard field goal, 12:59. Dolphins 7–3. **Drive: 9 plays, 43 yards, 4:34.**
- MIA – Riley Patterson 34-yard field goal, 6:14. Dolphins 10–3. **Drive: 5 plays, 25 yards, 2:16.**
- MIA – Malik Washington 9-yard pass from Tua Tagovailoa (Riley Patterson kick), 0:11. Dolphins 17–3. **Drive: 10 plays, 82 yards, 4:29.**

**Third quarter**

- MIA – Jaylen Waddle 43-yard pass from Tua Tagovailoa (Riley Patterson kick), 4:18. Dolphins 24–3. **Drive: 10 plays, 84 yards, 6:05.**

**Fourth quarter**

- MIA – Ollie Gordon II 20-yard pass from Tua Tagovailoa (Riley Patterson kick), 13:28. Dolphins 31–3. **Drive: 7 plays, 41 yards, 4:06.**
- MIA – Riley Patterson 36-yard field goal, 8:36. Dolphins 34–3. **Drive: 5 plays, 20 yards, 2:20.**
- ATL – Tyler Allgeier 6-yard run (Parker Romo kick), 5:01. Dolphins 34–10. **Drive: 11 plays, 65 yards, 3:35.**

**Top passers**

- MIA – Tua Tagovailoa – 20/26, 205 yards, 4 TD
- ATL – Kirk Cousins – 21/31, 173 yards

**Top rushers**

- MIA – De'Von Achane – 18 rushes, 67 yards
- ATL – Bijan Robinson – 9 rushes, 25 yards

**Top receivers**

- MIA – Jaylen Waddle – 5 receptions, 99 yards, TD
- ATL – Kyle Pitts – 9 receptions, 59 yards

Despite entering the game as touchdown favorites, the Falcons were crushed by the Dolphins. With their second straight loss, the Falcons fell to 3–4 and 1–1 against the AFC East.

==== Week 9: at New England Patriots ====
Week 9: Atlanta Falcons at New England Patriots – Game summary

Quarter	1	2	3	4	Total
Falcons	7	7	0	9	**23**
**Patriots**	7	14	3	0	**24**

at Gillette Stadium, Foxborough, Massachusetts

- Date: November 2
- Game time: 1:00 p.m. EST
- Game weather: Sunny, 52 °F (11 °C)
- Game attendance: 64,628
- Referee: Brad Allen
- TV announcers (CBS): Andrew Catalon, Charles Davis, Jason McCourty and AJ Ross
- Recap, Game Book

Game information

**First quarter**

- NE – Demario Douglas 17-yard pass from Drake Maye (Andres Borregales kick), 7:44. Patriots 7–0. **Drive: 10 plays, 75 yards, 5:35.**
- ATL – Drake London 1-yard pass from Michael Penix Jr. (Parker Romo kick), 0:24. Tied 7–7. **Drive: 5 plays, 53 yards, 2:55.**

**Second quarter**

- NE – Terrell Jennings 3-yard run (Andres Borregales kick), 8:52. Patriots 14–7. **Drive: 12 plays, 65 yards, 6:32.**
- NE – Stefon Diggs 11-yard pass from Drake Maye (Andres Borregales kick), 5:11. Patriots 21–7. **Drive: 5 plays, 72 yards, 2:34.**
- ATL – Drake London 2-yard pass from Michael Penix Jr. (Parker Romo kick), 0:12. Patriots 21–14. **Drive: 2 plays, 6 yards, 0:11.**

**Third quarter**

- NE – Andres Borregales 32-yard field goal, 6:26. Patriots 24–14. **Drive: 15 plays, 56 yards, 8:34.**

**Fourth quarter**

- ATL – Parker Romo 38-yard field goal, 14:08. Patriots 24–17. **Drive: 9 plays, 31 yards, 5:29.**
- ATL – Drake London 8-yard pass from Michael Penix Jr. (kick failed), 4:40. Patriots 24–23. **Drive: 12 plays, 85 yards, 5:01.**

**Top passers**

- ATL – Michael Penix Jr. – 22/37, 221 yards, 3 TD
- NE – Drake Maye – 19/29, 259 yards, 2 TD, INT

**Top rushers**

- ATL – Bijan Robinson – 12 rushes, 46 yards
- NE – TreVeyon Henderson – 14 rushes, 55 yards

**Top receivers**

- ATL – Drake London – 9 receptions, 118 yards, 3 TD
- NE – Demario Douglas – 4 receptions, 100 yards, TD

With their 9th loss to New England since 2001, the Falcons fell to 3–5 and 1–2 against the AFC East.

==== Week 10: at Indianapolis Colts ====
NFL International Series

Week 10: Atlanta Falcons at Indianapolis Colts – Game summary

Quarter	1	2	3	4	OT	Total
Falcons	7	7	3	8	0	**25**
**Colts**	13	0	0	12	6	**31**

at Olympiastadion, Berlin, Germany

- Date: November 9
- Game time: 3:30 p.m. CET/9:30 a.m. EST
- Game weather: Cloudy, 46 °F (8 °C)
- Game attendance: 72,203
- Referee: Clete Blakeman
- TV announcers (WAGA/NFLN): Adam Amin, Kurt Warner, Kristina Pink and Stacey Dales
- Recap, Game Book

Game information

**First quarter**

- IND – Jonathan Taylor 1-yard run (kick failed), 8:36. Colts 6–0. **Drive: 2 plays, 23 yards, 0:39.**
- ATL – Tyler Allgeier 1-yard run (Zane Gonzalez kick), 6:07. Falcons 7–6. **Drive: 5 plays, 81 yards, 2:29.**
- IND – Alec Pierce 37-yard pass from Daniel Jones (Michael Badgley kick), 5:19. Colts 13–7. **Drive: 2 plays, 65 yards, 0:48.**

**Second quarter**

- ATL – Drake London 16-yard pass from Michael Penix Jr. (Zane Gonzalez kick), 3:25. Falcons 14–13. **Drive: 6 plays, 55 yards, 3:29.**

**Third quarter**

- ATL – Zane Gonzalez 43-yard field goal, 12:26. Falcons 17–13. **Drive: 7 plays, 44 yards, 2:34.**

**Fourth quarter**

- IND – Michael Badgley 34-yard field goal, 9:00. Falcons 17–16. **Drive: 9 plays, 31 yards, 5:28.**
- IND – Jonathan Taylor 83-yard run (pass failed), 6:02. Colts 22–17. **Drive: 2 plays, 91 yards, 0:53.**
- ATL – Tyler Allgeier 1-yard run (Michael Penix Jr–Drake London pass), 1:44. Falcons 25–22. **Drive: 9 plays, 71 yards, 4:18.**
- IND – Michael Badgley 44-yard field goal, 0:25. Tied 25–25. **Drive: 8 plays, 22 yards, 1:19.**

**Overtime**

- IND – Jonathan Taylor 8-yard run, 3:31. Colts 31–25. **Drive: 7 plays, 57 yards, 3:58.**

**Top passers**

- ATL – Michael Penix Jr. – 12/28, 177 yards, TD
- IND – Daniel Jones – 19/26, 255 yards, TD, INT

**Top rushers**

- ATL – Bijan Robinson – 17 rushes, 84 yards
- IND – Jonathan Taylor – 32 rushes, 244 yards, 3 TD

**Top receivers**

- ATL – Drake London – 6 receptions, 104 yards, TD
- IND – Tyler Warren – 8 receptions, 99 yards

The Falcons participated in the first regular season game held in Berlin, Germany. Their defense struggled against Colts running back Jonathan Taylor, who rushed for 244 yards and three touchdowns. His performance included an 83-yard touchdown run, the longest run of the season, and an 8-yard rushing score in overtime that sealed the Colts’ victory. Meanwhile, the Falcons’ offense faltered on third down, failing to convert any of their eight attempts (0 for 8). With their fourth consecutive loss, the Falcons fell to 3–6, their worst start since 2020, and 1–3 against the AFC.

==== Week 11: vs. Carolina Panthers ====
Week 11: Carolina Panthers at Atlanta Falcons – Game summary

Quarter	1	2	3	4	OT	Total
**Panthers**	7	3	9	8	3	**30**
Falcons	7	14	0	6	0	**27**

at Mercedes-Benz Stadium, Atlanta, Georgia

- Date: November 16
- Game time: 1:00 p.m. EST
- Game weather: Mostly sunny, 72 °F (22 °C) (retractable roof open)
- Game attendance: 70,739
- Referee: Clay Martin
- TV announcers (Fox): Jason Benetti, Brady Quinn and Sarah Kustok
- Recap, Game Book

Game information

**First quarter**

- CAR – Tetairoa McMillan 7-yard pass from Bryce Young (Ryan Fitzgerald kick), 5:25. Panthers 7–0. **Drive: 12 plays, 73 yards, 7:30.**
- ATL – Bijan Robinson 4-yard run (Zane Gonzalez kick), 3:33. Tied 7–7. **Drive: 4 plays, 75 yards, 1:52.**

**Second quarter**

- ATL – Bijan Robinson 1-yard run (Zane Gonzalez kick), 7:52. Falcons 14–7. **Drive: 13 plays, 95 yards, 8:07.**
- ATL – Tyler Allgeier 1-yard run (Zane Gonzalez kick), 1:41. Falcons 21–7. **Drive: 7 plays, 59 yards, 3:43.**
- CAR – Ryan Fitzgerald 29-yard field goal, 0:25. Falcons 21–10. **Drive: 7 plays, 58 yards, 1:16.**

**Third quarter**

- CAR – Xavier Legette 36-yard pass from Bryce Young (pass failed), 12:04. Falcons 21–16. **Drive: 5 plays, 68 yards, 2:56.**
- CAR – Ryan Fitzgerald 34-yard field goal, 0:58. Falcons 21–19. **Drive: 10 plays, 63 yards, 4:14.**

**Fourth quarter**

- ATL – Zane Gonzalez 52-yard field goal, 2:43. Falcons 24–19. **Drive: 4 plays, 5 yards, 0:19.**
- CAR – Tetairoa McMillan 12-yard pass from Bryce Young (Bryce Young–Jalen Coker pass), 1:08. Panthers 27–24. **Drive: 9 plays, 65 yards, 1:35.**
- ATL – Zane Gonzalez 45-yard field goal, 0:16. Tied 27–27. **Drive: 6 plays, 28 yards, 0:52.**

**Overtime**

- CAR – Ryan Fitzgerald 28-yard field goal, 5:10. Panthers 30–27. **Drive: 6 plays, 60 yards, 3:35.**

**Top passers**

- CAR – Bryce Young – 31/45, 448 yards, 3 TD
- ATL – Michael Penix Jr. – 13/16, 175 yards

**Top rushers**

- CAR – Rico Dowdle – 19 rushes, 45 yards
- ATL – Bijan Robinson – 23 rushes, 104 yards, 2 TD

**Top receivers**

- CAR – Tetairoa McMillan – 8 receptions, 130 yards, 2 TD
- ATL – Drake London – 7 receptions, 119 yards

With the overtime loss, the Falcons were swept by Carolina for the first time since the 2013 season and fell to 3–7.

The Falcons’ defense allowed Panthers quarterback Bryce Young to complete 31-of-45 passes for 448 yards and three touchdowns, despite Young being escorted to the locker room late in the first quarter with a right ankle injury. His 448 passing yards set a Panthers franchise record for the most passing yards in a single game.

==== Week 12: at New Orleans Saints ====
Week 12: Atlanta Falcons at New Orleans Saints – Game summary

Quarter	1	2	3	4	Total
**Falcons**	3	13	0	8	**24**
Saints	0	7	0	3	**10**

at Caesars Superdome, New Orleans, Louisiana

- Date: November 23
- Game time: 4:25 p.m. EST/3:25 p.m. CST
- Game weather: None (indoor stadium)
- Game attendance: 70,005
- Referee: Brad Rogers
- TV announcers (Fox): Adam Amin, Drew Brees and Kristina Pink
- Recap, Game Book

Game information

**First quarter**

- ATL – Zane Gonzalez 56-yard field goal, 10:42. Falcons 3–0. **Drive: 4 plays, 1 yard, 2:14.**

**Second quarter**

- ATL – Davis Sills 9-yard pass from Kirk Cousins (Zane Gonzalez kick), 11:31. Falcons 10–0. **Drive: 8 plays, 77 yards, 3:46.**
- NO – Justin Reid 49-yard interception return (Blake Grupe kick), 6:41. Falcons 10–7.
- ATL – Zane Gonzalez 41-yard field goal, 1:56. Falcons 13–7. **Drive: 9 plays, 41 yards, 4:45.**
- ATL – Zane Gonzalez 54-yard field goal, 0:00. Falcons 16–7. **Drive: 10 plays, 26 yards, 0:52.**

**Third quarter**

- No scoring plays

**Fourth quarter**

- NO – Blake Grupe 33-yard field goal, 12:13. Falcons 16–10. **Drive: 15 plays, 44 yards, 8:24.**
- ATL – Darnell Mooney 49-yard pass from Kirk Cousins (Bijan Robinson run), 11:04. Falcons 24–10. **Drive: 3 plays, 68 yards, 1:09.**

**Top passers**

- ATL – Kirk Cousins – 16/23, 199 yards, 2 TD, INT
- NO – Tyler Shough – 30/43, 243 yards, INT

**Top rushers**

- ATL – Bijan Robinson – 14 rushes, 70 yards
- NO – Tyler Shough – 7 rushes, 22 yards

**Top receivers**

- ATL – Darnell Mooney – 3 receptions, 74 yards, TD
- NO – Chris Olave – 9 receptions, 70 yards

With their first win in New Orleans since 2021, the Falcons snapped their five-game losing streak and improved to 4–7.

==== Week 13: at New York Jets ====
Week 13: Atlanta Falcons at New York Jets – Game summary

Quarter	1	2	3	4	Total
Falcons	0	7	10	7	**24**
**Jets**	0	7	7	13	**27**

at MetLife Stadium, East Rutherford, New Jersey

- Date: November 30
- Game time: 1:00 p.m. EST
- Game weather: Cloudy, 43 °F (6 °C)
- Game attendance: 70,012
- Referee: Shawn Hochuli
- TV announcers (Fox): Kenny Albert, Jonathan Vilma and Megan Olivi
- Recap, Game Book

Game information

**First quarter**

- No scoring plays

**Second quarter**

- NYJ – Breece Hall 2-yard run (Nick Folk kick), 13:58. Jets 7–0. **Drive: 1 play, 2 yards, 0:02.**
- ATL – Tyler Allgeier 1-yard run (Zane Gonzalez kick), 0:09. Tied 7–7. **Drive: 10 plays, 62 yards, 3:01.**

**Third quarter**

- ATL – Bijan Robinson 5-yard run (Zane Gonzalez kick), 9:36. Falcons 14–7. **Drive: 8 plays, 95 yards, 4:08.**
- NYJ – AD Mitchell 52-yard pass from Tyrod Taylor (Nick Folk kick), 8:58. Tied 14–14. **Drive: 2 plays, 65 yards, 0:38.**
- ATL – Zane Gonzalez 52-yard field goal, 0:00. Falcons 17–14. **Drive: 5 plays, 21 yards, 1:44.**

**Fourth quarter**

- NYJ – Nick Folk 32-yard field goal, 13:23. Tied 17–17. **Drive: 4 plays, 1 yard, 1:37.**
- ATL – David Sills 9-yard pass from Kirk Cousins (Zane Gonzalez kick), 8:46. Falcons 24–17. **Drive: 8 plays, 74 yards, 4:37.**
- NYJ – Tyrod Taylor 10-yard run (Nick Folk kick), 1:53. Tied 24–24. **Drive: 15 plays, 65 yards, 6:53.**
- NYJ – Nick Folk 56-yard field goal, 0:00. Jets 27–24. **Drive: 7 plays, 19 yards, 0:35.**

**Top passers**

- ATL – Kirk Cousins – 21/33, 234 yards, TD
- NYJ – Tyrod Taylor – 19/33, 172 yards, TD

**Top rushers**

- ATL – Bijan Robinson – 23 rushes, 142 yards, TD
- NYJ – Breece Hall – 19 rushes, 68 yards, TD

**Top receivers**

- ATL – Kyle Pitts – 7 receptions, 82 yards
- NYJ – AD Mitchell – 8 receptions, 102 yards, TD

With their first loss to the Jets since 2013, the Falcons fell to 4–8 and finished 1–3 against the AFC East (1–4 against the AFC).

==== Week 14: vs. Seattle Seahawks ====
Week 14: Seattle Seahawks at Atlanta Falcons – Game summary

Quarter	1	2	3	4	Total
**Seahawks**	3	3	17	14	**37**
Falcons	3	3	0	3	**9**

at Mercedes-Benz Stadium, Atlanta, Georgia

- Date: December 7
- Game time: 1:00& p.m. EST
- Game weather: None (retractable roof closed)
- Game attendance: 68,721
- Referee: Alex Kemp
- TV announcers (Fox): Kevin Kugler, Daryl Johnston and Allison Williams
- Recap, Game Book

Game information

**First quarter**

- ATL – Zane Gonzalez 35-yard field goal, 7:14. Falcons 3–0. **Drive: 5 plays, 22 yards, 2:04.**
- SEA – Jason Myers 22-yard field goal, 0:49. Tied 3–3. **Drive: 12 plays, 70 yards, 6:25.**

**Second quarter**

- ATL – Zane Gonzalez 43-yard field goal, 1:01. Falcons 6–3. **Drive: 11 plays, 63 yards, 4:48.**
- SEA – Jason Myers 48-yard field goal, 0:00. Tied 6–6. **Drive: 7 plays, 45 yards, 1:01.**

**Third quarter**

- SEA – Rashid Shaheed 100-yard kickoff return (Jason Myers kick), 14:48. Seahawks 13–6.
- SEA – Jaxon Smith-Njigba 28-yard pass from Sam Darnold (Jason Myers kick), 6:16. Seahawks 20–6. **Drive: 8 plays, 88 yards, 5:02.**
- SEA – Jason Myers 37-yard field goal, 2:39. Seahawks 23–6. **Drive: 6 plays, 28 yards, 2:15.**

**Fourth quarter**

- ATL – Zane Gonzalez 27-yard field goal, 14:57. Seahawks 23–9. **Drive: 8 plays, 59 yards, 2:42.**
- SEA – Cooper Kupp 11-yard pass from Sam Darnold (Jason Myers kick), 12:13. Seahawks 30–9. **Drive: 6 plays, 60 yards, 2:44.**
- SEA – Jaxon Smith-Njigba 4-yard pass from Sam Darnold (Jason Myers kick), 8:27. Seahawks 37–9. **Drive: 6 plays, 35 yards, 3:02.**

**Top passers**

- SEA – Sam Darnold – 20/30, 249 yards, 3 TD, INT
- ATL – Kirk Cousins – 15/30, 162 yards, 2 INT

**Top rushers**

- SEA – Zach Charbonnet – 7 rushes, 46 yards
- ATL – Bijan Robinson – 20 rushes, 86 yards

**Top receivers**

- SEA – Jaxon Smith-Njigba – 7 receptions, 92 yards, 2 TD
- ATL – Kyle Pitts – 6 receptions, 90 yards

After a slow first half, the second-half kickoff was returned 100 yards for a touchdown by Seahawks returner Rashid Shaheed, initiating a Seahawks-dominated second half against the Falcons.

With the loss, the Falcons were eliminated from playoff contention and clinched an eighth consecutive losing season, matching the longest such streak in franchise history.

==== Week 15: at Tampa Bay Buccaneers ====
Week 15: Atlanta Falcons at Tampa Bay Buccaneers – Game summary

Quarter	1	2	3	4	Total
**Falcons**	0	14	0	15	**29**
Buccaneers	7	6	7	8	**28**

at Raymond James Stadium, Tampa, Florida

- Date: December 11
- Game time: 8:15 p.m. EST
- Game weather: Clear, 56 °F (13 °C)
- Game attendance: 64,917
- Referee: Carl Cheffers
- TV announcers (Prime Video): Al Michaels, Kirk Herbstreit and Kaylee Hartung
- Recap, Game Book

Game information

**First quarter**

- TB – Sean Tucker 1-yard run (Chase McLaughlin kick), 1:38. Buccaneers 7–0. **Drive: 11 plays, 83 yards, 4:44.**

**Second quarter**

- ATL – Kyle Pitts 8-yard pass from Kirk Cousins (Zane Gonzalez kick), 12:11. Tied 7–7. **Drive: 9 plays, 65 yards, 4:27.**
- TB – Chase McLaughlin 49-yard field goal, 2:04. Buccaneers 10–7. **Drive: 9 plays, 49 yards, 4:25.**
- ATL – Kyle Pitts 17-yard pass from Kirk Cousins (Zane Gonzalez kick), 0:38. Falcons 14–10. **Drive: 4 plays, 65 yards, 1:26.**
- TB – Chase McLaughlin 52-yard field goal, 0:00. Falcons 14–13. **Drive: 5 plays, 40 yards, 0:38.**

**Third quarter**

- TB – Devin Culp 6-yard pass from Baker Mayfield (Chase McLaughlin kick), 6:22. Buccaneers 20–14. **Drive: 9 plays, 90 yards, 5:14.**

**Fourth quarter**

- TB – Chris Godwin 3-yard pass from Baker Mayfield (Chase McLaughlin kick), 13:34. Buccaneers 28–14. **Drive: 4 plays, 25 yards, 1:32.**
- ATL – Bijan Robinson 6-yard run (pass failed), 9:37. Buccaneers 28–20. **Drive: 8 plays, 65 yards, 3:57.**
- ATL – Kyle Pitts 7-yard pass from Kirk Cousins (pass failed), 3:34. Buccaneers 28–26. **Drive: 10 plays, 67 yards, 4:48.**
- ATL – Zane Gonzalez 43-yard field goal, 0:00. Falcons 29–28. **Drive: 9 plays, 45 yards, 1:49.**

**Top passers**

- ATL – Kirk Cousins – 30/44, 373 yards, 3 TD
- TB – Baker Mayfield – 19/34, 277 yards, 2 TD, INT

**Top rushers**

- ATL – Bijan Robinson – 19 rushes, 93 yards, TD
- TB – Bucky Irving – 16 rushes, 60 yards

**Top receivers**

- ATL – Kyle Pitts – 11 receptions, 166 yards, 3 TD
- TB – Mike Evans – 6 receptions, 132 yards

The Buccaneers took a 28–14 lead in the fourth quarter with 13:34 remaining; however, the Falcons began to mount a comeback. After a Falcons touchdown, Buccaneers quarterback Baker Mayfield threw an interception to Dee Alford, which led to another Falcons touchdown. A missed two-point conversion left the Buccaneers with a two-point lead. On the ensuing drive, the Buccaneers punted with two minutes remaining. On the final drive, the Falcons advanced down the field, converting a third-and-28 and a fourth-and-14, before kicker Zane Gonzalez hit a 43-yard game-winning field goal, overcoming the 28–14 deficit and 19 penalties.

The Falcons committed 19 penalties, setting a franchise record.

==== Week 16: at Arizona Cardinals ====
Week 16: Atlanta Falcons at Arizona Cardinals – Game summary

Quarter	1	2	3	4	Total
**Falcons**	3	13	3	7	**26**
Cardinals	10	6	0	3	**19**

at State Farm Stadium, Glendale, Arizona

- Date: December 21
- Game time: 4:05 p.m. EST/2:05 p.m. MST
- Game weather: Sunny, 76 °F (24 °C) (retractable roof open)
- Game attendance: 60,673
- Referee: Land Clark
- TV announcers (Fox): Jason Benetti, Brady Quinn and Sarah Kustok
- Recap, Game Book

Game information

**First quarter**

- ARI – Chad Ryland 50-yard field goal, 12:46. Cardinals 3–0. **Drive: 7 plays, 29 yards, 2:14.**
- ARI – Michael Wilson 32-yard pass from Jacoby Brissett (Chad Ryland kick), 7:43. Cardinals 10–0. **Drive: 5 plays, 55 yards, 2:10.**
- ATL – Zane Gonzalez 49-yard field goal, 2:17. Cardinals 10–3. **Drive: 11 plays, 34 yards, 5:26.**

**Second quarter**

- ARI – Chad Ryland 51-yard field goal, 13:27. Cardinals 13–3. **Drive: 8 plays, 42 yards, 3:50.**
- ATL – Bijan Robinson 13-yard pass from Kirk Cousins (Zane Gonzalez kick), 11:56. Cardinals 13–10. **Drive: 3 plays, 65 yards, 1:31.**
- ARI – Chad Ryland 25-yard field goal, 5:02. Cardinals 16–10. **Drive: 13 plays, 59 yards, 6:54.**
- ATL – Kyle Pitts 5-yard pass from Kirk Cousins (kick failed), 0:25. Tied 16–16. **Drive: 14 plays, 60 yards, 4:37.**

**Third quarter**

- ATL – Zane Gonzalez 40-yard field goal, 7:25. Falcons 19–16. **Drive: 13 plays, 44 yards, 7:35.**

**Fourth quarter**

- ATL – Kirk Cousins 1-yard run (Zane Gonzalez kick), 12:28. Falcons 26–16. **Drive: 12 plays, 66 yards, 6:14.**
- ARI – Chad Ryland 34-yard field goal, 4:37. Falcons 26–19. **Drive: 10 plays, 37 yards, 2:43.**

**Top passers**

- ATL – Kirk Cousins – 21/35, 197 yards, 2 TD, INT
- ARI – Jacoby Brissett – 16/31, 203 yards, TD, INT

**Top rushers**

- ATL – Tyler Allgeier – 16 rushes, 79 yards
- ARI – Michael Carter – 11 rushes, 65 yards

**Top receivers**

- ATL – Bijan Robinson – 7 receptions, 92 yards, TD
- ARI – Elijah Higgins – 7 receptions, 91 yards

With their second straight win, Atlanta improved to 6–9 and finished 4–5 on the road.

==== Week 17: vs. Los Angeles Rams ====
Week 17: Los Angeles Rams at Atlanta Falcons – Game summary

Quarter	1	2	3	4	Total
Rams	0	0	10	14	**24**
**Falcons**	7	14	3	3	**27**

at Mercedes-Benz Stadium, Atlanta, Georgia

- Date: December 29
- Game time: 8:15 p.m. EST
- Game weather: None (retractable roof closed)
- Game attendance: 69,313
- Referee: Clete Blakeman
- TV announcers (ESPN, WUPA, KABC): Joe Buck, Troy Aikman, Lisa Salters and Laura Rutledge
  Game exclusive to WUPA and KABC through syndication. Out of market on ESPN.
- Recap, Game Book

Game information

**First quarter**

- ATL – Bijan Robinson 4-yard pass from Kirk Cousins (Zane Gonzalez kick), 6:11. Falcons 7–0. **Drive: 11 plays, 65 yards, 5:35.**

**Second quarter**

- ATL – Jessie Bates III 34-yard interception return (Zane Gonzalez kick), 8:30. Falcons 14–0.
- ATL – Bijan Robinson 93-yard run (Zane Gonzalez kick), 1:28. Falcons 21–0. **Drive: 1 play, 93 yards, 0:13.**

**Third quarter**

- LAR – Harrison Mevis 35-yard field goal, 11:08. Falcons 21–3. **Drive: 8 plays, 38 yards, 3:52.**
- ATL – Zane Gonzalez 56-yard field goal, 7:46. Falcons 24–3. **Drive: 5 plays, 31 yards, 3:22.**
- LAR – Terrance Ferguson 27-yard pass from Matthew Stafford (Harrison Mevis kick), 4:59. Falcons 24–10. **Drive: 6 plays, 65 yards, 2:47.**
- LAR – Jared Verse 76-yard blocked field goal return (Harrison Mevis kick), 0:31. Falcons 24–17.

**Fourth quarter**

- LAR – Puka Nacua 11-yard pass from Matthew Stafford (Harrison Mevis kick), 2:46. Tied 24–24. **Drive: 8 plays, 89 yards, 4:42.**
- ATL – Zane Gonzalez 51-yard field goal, 0:21. Falcons 27–24. **Drive: 9 plays, 32 yards, 2:25.**

**Top passers**

- LAR – Matthew Stafford – 22/38, 269 yards, 2 TD, 3 INT
- ATL – Kirk Cousins – 13/20, 126 yards, TD

**Top rushers**

- LAR – Kyren Williams – 13 rushes, 92 yards
- ATL – Bijan Robinson – 22 rushes, 195 yards, TD

**Top receivers**

- LAR – Xavier Smith – 4 receptions, 67 yards
- ATL – David Sills V – 3 receptions, 37 yards

Bijan Robinson delivered one of his strongest performances of the season, rushing for 195 yards, including a 93-yard touchdown run. Zane Gonzalez kicked a 51-yard field goal with 21 seconds remaining as the Falcons recovered after blowing two 21-point leads to secure the victory.

Robinson’s 93-yard touchdown run was not only the longest run of the NFL season but also set a new Falcons franchise record for the longest run in team history. He also established a new team record for most scrimmage yards in a single season, surpassing William Andrews’ previous mark of 2,176 yards set in 1983.

==== Week 18: vs. New Orleans Saints ====
Week 18: New Orleans Saints at Atlanta Falcons – Game summary

Quarter	1	2	3	4	Total
Saints	0	7	3	7	**17**
**Falcons**	7	3	3	6	**19**

at Mercedes-Benz Stadium, Atlanta, Georgia

- Date: January 4
- Game time: 1:00 p.m. EST
- Game weather: None (retractable roof closed)
- Game attendance: 69,512
- Referee: Ron Torbert
- TV announcers (Fox): Chris Myers, Mark Schlereth and Jen Hale
- Recap, Game Book

Game information

**First quarter**

- ATL – Drake London 15-yard pass from Kirk Cousins (Zane Gonzalez kick), 3:02. Falcons 7–0. **Drive: 2 plays, 5 yards, 0:16.**

**Second quarter**

- ATL – Zane Gonzalez 40-yard field goal, 10:19. Falcons 10–0. **Drive: 8 plays, 31 yards, 3:54.**
- NO – Tyler Shough 1-yard run (Charlie Smyth kick), 4:31. Falcons 10–7. **Drive: 10 plays, 65 yards, 5:48.**

**Third quarter**

- ATL – Zane Gonzalez 51-yard field goal, 8:50. Falcons 13–7. **Drive: 6 plays, 41 yards, 2:13.**
- NO – Charlie Smyth 29-yard field goal, 2:15. Falcons 13–10. **Drive: 14 plays, 56 yards, 6:35.**

**Fourth quarter**

- ATL – Zane Gonzalez 38-yard field goal, 10:43. Falcons 16–10. **Drive: 13 plays, 45 yards, 6:32.**
- ATL – Zane Gonzalez 38-yard field goal, 2:52. Falcons 19–10. **Drive: 4 plays, 7 yards, 0:22.**
- NO – Ronnie Bell 16-yard pass from Tyler Shough (Charlie Smyth kick), 1:11. Falcons 19–17. **Drive: 7 plays, 65 yards, 1:41.**

**Top passers**

- NO – Tyler Shough – 23/35, 259 yards, TD, INT
- ATL – Kirk Cousins – 18/32, 180 yards, TD, INT

**Top rushers**

- NO – Audric Estimé – 21 rushes, 63 yards
- ATL – Bijan Robinson – 15 rushes, 33 yards

**Top receivers**

- NO – Juwan Johnson – 3 receptions, 61 yards
- ATL – Drake London – 4 receptions, 78 yards, TD

The game-deciding play occurred with 3:24 remaining, when, from the Falcons’ 20-yard line, Saints quarterback Tyler Shough was intercepted by Dee Alford, who returned the ball 59 yards to set up a field goal for Atlanta.

With the win, the Falcons swept the Saints for the first time since 2016 and they finished 8–9 for the second straight year. The Falcons also finished 3–3 against the NFC South and 4–4 at home. The result also clinched the NFC South title for the Panthers, as the Falcons, Panthers, and Buccaneers all finished with identical 8–9 records. Carolina secured the division based on a superior head-to-head record against the other two teams (Panthers 3–1), compared to the Buccaneers (2–2) and Falcons (1–3), eliminating both Atlanta and Tampa Bay. The Falcons also set a single-season franchise record with 57 sacks.

Despite the victory, the Falcons fired head coach Raheem Morris and general manager Terry Fontenot hours later. Morris finished with a 20–25 record over his three-year tenure with no playoff appearances. Fontenot compiled a 36–48 record during his five-year tenure, also without any playoff appearances.

=== Standings ===
==== Division ====
NFC South
	W	L	T	PCT	DIV	CONF	PF	PA	STK
^{(4)} Carolina Panthers	8	9	0	.471	3–3	6–6	311	380	L2
Tampa Bay Buccaneers	8	9	0	.471	3–3	6–6	380	411	W1
Atlanta Falcons	8	9	0	.471	3–3	7–5	353	401	W4
New Orleans Saints	6	11	0	.353	3–3	4–8	306	383	L1

==== Conference ====
NFC
Seed	Team	Division	W	L	T	PCT	DIV	CONF	SOS	SOV	STK
**Division leaders**
1	Seattle Seahawks	West	14	3	0	.824	4–2	9–3	.498	.471	W7
2 (Note: Chicago finished ahead of Philadelphia based on head-to-head victory.)	Chicago Bears	North	11	6	0	.647	2–4	7–5	.458	.406	L2
3	Philadelphia Eagles	East	11	6	0	.647	3–3	8–4	.476	.455	L1
4 (Note: Carolina finished ahead of Tampa Bay and Atlanta based on head-to-head record (Carolina 3–1 to Tampa Bay 2–2 and Atlanta 1–3).)	Carolina Panthers	South	8	9	0	.471	3–3	6–6	.522	.463	L2
**Wild cards**
5 (Note: LA Rams finished ahead of San Francisco based on common games (LA Rams 9–3 to San Francisco 8–4 against: Arizona, Atlanta, Carolina, Houston, Indianapolis, Jacksonville, New Orleans, Seattle, Tampa Bay and Tennessee).)	Los Angeles Rams	West	12	5	0	.706	4–2	7–5	.526	.485	W1
6	San Francisco 49ers	West	12	5	0	.706	4–2	9–3	.498	.417	L1
7	Green Bay Packers	North	9	7	1	.559	4–2	7–4–1	.483	.431	L4
**Did not qualify for the postseason**
8 (Note: Minnesota finished ahead of Detroit based on head-to-head sweep.)	Minnesota Vikings	North	9	8	0	.529	4–2	7–5	.514	.431	W5
9	Detroit Lions	North	9	8	0	.529	2–4	6–6	.490	.428	W1
10 (Note: Tampa Bay finished ahead of Atlanta based on common games (Tampa Bay 6–6 to Atlanta 5–7 against: Arizona, Buffalo, Carolina, LA Rams, Miami, New England, New Orleans, NY Jets, San Francisco and Seattle).)	Tampa Bay Buccaneers	South	8	9	0	.471	3–3	6–6	.529	.485	W1
11	Atlanta Falcons	South	8	9	0	.471	3–3	7–5	.495	.449	W4
12	Dallas Cowboys	East	7	9	1	.441	4–2	4–7–1	.438	.311	L1
13	New Orleans Saints	South	6	11	0	.353	3–3	4–8	.495	.333	L1
14	Washington Commanders	East	5	12	0	.294	3–3	3–9	.507	.388	W1
15	New York Giants	East	4	13	0	.235	2–4	2–10	.524	.478	W2
16	Arizona Cardinals	West	3	14	0	.176	0–6	3–9	.571	.422	L9
**Tiebreakers** (Note: When breaking ties for three or more teams under the NFL's rules, they are first broken within divisions, then comparing only the highest ranked remaining team from each division.)
