= Marcus Anderson =

American football player (born 1959)

Marcus J. Anderson
No. 88, 80, 86
- Position: Wide receiver

Personal information
- Born: June 12, 1959 (age 67); Port Arthur, Texas, U.S.
- Listed height: 5 ft 11 in (1.80 m)
- Listed weight: 178 lb (81 kg)

Career information
- High school: LaGrange (Lake Charles, Louisiana)
- College: Tulane
- NFL draft: 1981: undrafted

Career history
- Los Angeles Rams (1981)*; Chicago Bears (1981); Green Bay Packers (1982)*; Chicago Blitz (1983–1984); New Jersey Generals (1985)
- * Offseason or practice squad member only

Career NFL statistics
- Receptions: 9
- Receiving yards: 243
- Touchdowns: 2
- Stats at Pro Football Reference

Marcus J. Anderson (born June 12, 1959) is an American former professional football player who was a wide receiver in the National Football League (NFL). He was signed by the Chicago Bears as an undrafted free agent in 1981. He played college football for the Tulane Green Wave.

== Professional career ==
Anderson attended LaGrange High School in Lake Charles, Louisiana. Anderson finished his undergraduate degree at Tulane University in Education and communication.

Anderson scored ten touch downs during his time at Tulane from 1977 - 1980.

Anderson played for the Chicago Bears and scored two touchdowns in 1981. His best game came on Monday Night Football in a road contest against the Detroit Lions where he caught six passes for 176 yards. Anderson scored one long touchdown in the game and made another catch going down at the one-yard line to set up another Bears touchdown.

Anderson played for the Chicago Blitz and led the team with 50 catches for 940 yards with 5 TDs. Playing for the New Jersey Generals in 1985.
