= John Parker Romo =

American football player (born 1997)

Profile
- Position: Placekicker

Personal information
- Born: August 24, 1997 (age 29); Peachtree City, Georgia, U.S.
- Listed height: 5 ft 11 in (1.80 m)
- Listed weight: 175 lb (79 kg)

Career information
- High school: McIntosh (Peachtree City)
- College: Central Arkansas (2016); Tulsa (2018); Virginia Tech (2019–2021)
- NFL draft: 2022: undrafted

Career history
- New Orleans Saints (2022)*; San Antonio Brahmas (2023); Detroit Lions (2023)*; Chicago Bears (2023)*; Minnesota Vikings (2024); New England Patriots (2024)*; Atlanta Falcons (2025)
- * Offseason or practice squad member only

Awards and highlights
- All-XFL Team (2023); XFL scoring leader (2023)

Career NFL statistics as of 2025
- Field goals made: 22
- Field goals attempted: 26
- Field goal percentage: 84.6%
- Longest field goal: 55
- Stats at Pro Football Reference

John Parker Romo (born August 24, 1997) is an American professional football placekicker. He played college football for the Central Arkansas Bears, Tulsa Golden Hurricane, and Virginia Tech Hokies. Romo signed with the New Orleans Saints as an undrafted free agent in 2022 and has also been a member of the Detroit Lions, Chicago Bears, Minnesota Vikings, New England Patriots, and Atlanta Falcons of the NFL and the San Antonio Brahmas of the XFL. He was selected to the All-XFL team following the 2023 XFL season and is the all-time leader of field goals in the XFL.

== College career ==
=== Central Arkansas ===
As a true freshman at the University of Central Arkansas, Romo served mostly as a kickoff specialist for the Bears. He finished the season with 2,556 yards on 44 kickoffs, with seven touchbacks in eight games, averaging 58.1 yards per kickoff. He did not make his only field goal attempt.

=== Tulsa ===
Romo spent his sophomore season at the University of Tulsa after transferring from Central Arkansas between semesters. He was a walk-on player for Tulsa, where he again handled mostly kickoff duties for the first half of the season. Romo handled most kicking duties during the second half of the season.

Romo finished the season with 3,602 yards on 59 kickoffs, with 28 touchbacks in 12 games played, averaging 61.1 yards per kickoff. He made two of his five field goals and had one blocked attempt. Romo fared better with extra points and finished the season with 17 extra points made on 18 attempts.

=== Virginia Tech ===
Romo transferred again and played his last three collegiate season at Virginia Tech. He was exclusively a kickoff specialist for the Hokies in the 2019 and 2020 seasons. Romo added kicking duties in his final season. He finished the 2021 season with 18 field goals made from 22 attempts. Romo was a perfect 34 for 34 on extra points.

== Professional career ==
Pre-draft measurables
Height	Weight	Arm length	Hand span	Wingspan
5 ft 11 1/8 in (1.81 m)	176 lb (80 kg)	29 3/8 in (0.75 m)	8 3/8 in (0.21 m)	6 ft 0 3/8 in (1.84 m)
All values from Pro Day

=== New Orleans Saints ===
Following the 2022 NFL draft, the New Orleans Saints signed Romo as an undrafted free agent out of Virginia Tech on May 16, 2022. He was cut on August 15, and was re-signed four days later.

=== San Antonio Brahmas ===
Romo was signed by the San Antonio Brahmas for the 2023 XFL season. San Antonio Team scout, Jeff Leiber, recommended Romo after noticing his powerful leg and precision accuracy while combing through video footage of available kickers. Romo would play in 10 of the Brahmas games finishing the season with 17 field goals made out of 19 attempted for 51 total points. Romo was named to the 2023 All-XFL team on May 8. He held the XFL record for the longest field goal, before Donny Hageman broke his 57-yard field goal with a 59 yarder against the Houston Roughnecks. Romo was released from his contract on May 15, 2023.

=== Detroit Lions ===
On May 15, 2023, Romo signed with the Detroit Lions following a successful tryout. He was waived on August 29.

=== Chicago Bears ===
On August 31, 2023, Romo was signed to the Chicago Bears' practice squad. He was released on October 10.

=== Minnesota Vikings ===
On March 13, 2024, Romo signed with the Minnesota Vikings. He was waived on July 29, but was re-signed on November 5 as an injury replacement kicker for Will Reichard. Five days later, Romo made his NFL debut against the Jacksonville Jaguars, where he converted all four of his field goal attempts, providing all scoring in a 12–7 victory. Romo was waived again on December 7.

=== New England Patriots ===
On December 10, 2024, Romo signed to the New England Patriots' practice squad. He signed a reserve/future contract on January 6, 2025.

During the 2025 preseason, Romo lost the kicking competition to rookie Andrés Borregales and was released by the Patriots as part of final roster cuts on August 26, 2025.

=== Atlanta Falcons ===
On September 9, 2025, Romo was signed to the Atlanta Falcons' practice squad, amid struggles from incumbent kicker Younghoe Koo. He was signed to the active roster on September 19, corresponding with the release of Koo. During Week 9 against his former team, the New England Patriots, Romo missed a crucial extra-point in the fourth quarter that would have tied the game, and the Falcons narrowly lost on the road 24–23. He was waived on November 4 in favor of Zane Gonzalez.

== Career statistics ==
Legend
	Led the league
**Bold**	Career high

=== College ===
Year	Team	GP	Overall FGs				PATs			Total points
Year	Team	GP	Lng	FGA	FGM	Pct	XPA	XPM	Pct	Total points
2016	Central Arkansas	8	–	1	0	0.0	0	0	–	0
2018	Tulsa	12	34	5	2	40.0	18	17	94.4	23
2019	Virginia Tech	13	–	0	0	–	0	0	–	0
2020	Virginia Tech	11	–	0	0	–	0	0	–	0
2021	Virginia Tech	13	52	22	18	81.8	34	34	100.0	88
Career		57	52	28	20	71.4	52	51	98.1	111

=== XFL ===
Year	Team	GP	Field Goals									Total Points
Year	Team	GP	FGM	FGA	FG%	<20	20−29	30−39	40−49	50+	Lng	Total Points
2023	SA	10	17	19	89.4	0–0	6–6	2–3	7–7	2–3	57	51
Total		10	17	19	89.4	0–0	6–6	2–3	7–7	2–3	57	51

=== NFL ===
Year	Team	GP	Field Goals									Extra Points			Points
Year	Team	GP	FGM	FGA	FG%	<20	20−29	30−39	40−49	50+	Lng	XPM	XPA	XP%	Points
2024	MIN	4	**11**	12	**91.6**	0–0	**3–3**	**3–3**	**4–5**	**1–1**	**55**	7	8	87.5	40
2025	ATL	**7**	**11**	**14**	78.5	0–0	2–2	7–8	1–2	1–2	54	**12**	**13**	**92.3**	**45**
Total		11	22	26	84.6	0–0	5–5	10–11	5–7	2–3	55	19	21	94.4	85

== Personal life ==
Born in Peachtree City, Georgia, Romo is of Mexican descent.
