= LaGrange High School (Louisiana) =

Location
- 3420 Louisiana Avenue, Lake Charles 70605; Louisiana; United States; 30°11′44″N 93°12′24″W

Information
- Type: Public Secondary
- Motto: Providing quality education for all students
- Established: 1903
- School district: Calcasieu Parish Public Schools
- Principal: Dr. Lisa Morgan
- Staff: 95.43 (FTE)
- Grades: 9–12
- Enrollment: 942 (2023-24)
- Student to teacher ratio: 9.86
- Campus: Urban
- Colors: Purple and white
- Mascot: Alligator
- Nickname: Gators
- Newspaper: LHS Tribune
- Yearbook: Resumé
- Website: LaGrange High School

LaGrange High School (/lə ˈɡrɑːndʒ/ lə GRAWNJ) is a public high school in Lake Charles in southwestern Louisiana, United States. It is operated by the Calcasieu Parish School Board.

== Athletics ==
LaGrange High athletics competes in the LHSAA.

=== State Championships ===
- Football: 1938
- Boys basketball: 1967
- Girls basketball: 2020, 2021

== Notable alumni ==
- Marcus Anderson (1977), professional football player for the Chicago Bears
- Don Breaux (1958), professional football player for the Denver Broncos and San Diego Chargers
- Grant Cardone (born 1958), entrepreneur, real estate investor, sales trainer, and author of *The 10X Rule* and other business books; founder of Cardone Capital
- John Demarie (1963), professional football player for the Cleveland Browns
- Terry Fontenot (1999), former Atlanta Falcons general manager
- Ray Fontenot (1975), professional baseball player for the (New York Yankees, Chicago Cubs, and Minnesota Twins)
- Chuck Kleckley, 74th Speaker of the Louisiana House of Representatives
- Randy Roach (1969), mayor of Lake Charles from 2000 to 2017, member of the Louisiana House of Representatives from 1988 to 1986
- Jerry Wilson (defensive back) (1991), professional football player for primarily the Miami Dolphins and San Diego Chargers
