= Bijan Robinson =

American football player (born 2002)

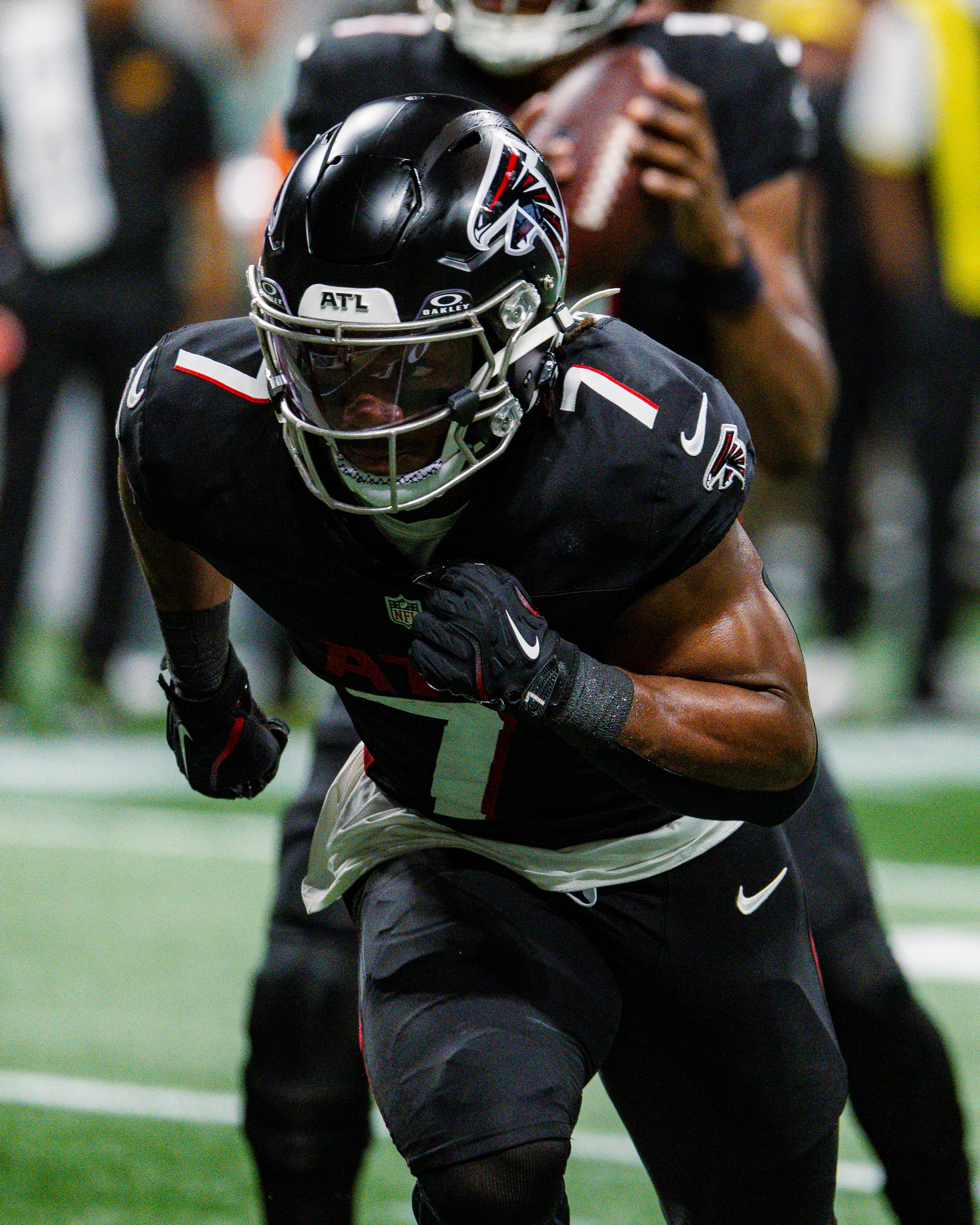
- Robinson with the Atlanta Falcons in 2025

No. 7 – Atlanta Falcons
- Position: Running back
- Roster status: Active

Personal information
- Born: January 30, 2002 (age 24); Tucson, Arizona, U.S.
- Listed height: 5 ft 11 in (1.80 m)
- Listed weight: 215 lb (98 kg)

Career information
- High school: Salpointe (Tucson)
- College: Texas (2020–2022)
- NFL draft: 2023: 1st round, 8th overall pick

Career history
- Atlanta Falcons (2023–present)

Awards and highlights
- First-team All-Pro (2025) (Note: Selected as a Running Back); Second-team All-Pro (2025) (Note: Selected as the all-purpose); 2× Pro Bowl (2024, 2025); PFWA All-Rookie Team (2023); Doak Walker Award (2022); Unanimous All-American (2022); 2× First-team All-Big 12 (2021, 2022); Freshman All-American (2020)

Career NFL statistics as of Week 10, 2026
- Rushing yards: 4,861
- Rushing average: 4.9
- Rushing touchdowns: 31
- Receptions: 233
- Receiving yards: 1,994
- Receiving touchdowns: 10
- Stats at Pro Football Reference

Bijan Robinson (/bəˈʒɑːn/ bə-zhahn; born January 30, 2002) is an American professional football running back for the Atlanta Falcons of the National Football League (NFL). He played college football for the Texas Longhorns, where he won the Doak Walker Award and was a unanimous All-American in 2022 before being selected by the Falcons eighth overall in the 2023 NFL draft.

== Early life ==
Robinson was born on January 30, 2002, in Tucson, Arizona. He attended Salpointe Catholic High School, setting a state record after rushing for 7,036 yards and 114 touchdowns. As a senior, he was the Arizona Gatorade Football Player of the Year after rushing for 2,235 yards and 38 touchdowns on 126 carries. He was selected to play in the 2020 All-American Bowl. A five-star recruit, Robinson committed to play college football at the University of Texas at Austin.

== College career ==
Robinson earned immediate playing time as a freshman at Texas in 2020. He earned the 2020 Alamo Bowl MVP with 10 rushes for 183 yards and a touchdown against Colorado. He finished the 2020 season with 86 carries for 703 rushing yards and four rushing touchdowns to go with two receiving touchdowns.

On October 2, 2021, against TCU, Robinson had 35 carries for 216 yards and two touchdowns in the victory. In the 2021 season, Robinson rushed for 1,127 yards and was named a member of the All Big-12 Conference first team.

On November 19, 2022, against Kansas, Robinson had 25 carries for 243 rushing yards and four touchdowns in the win. In the 2022 season, he had 1,580 rushing yards and 18 touchdowns was named a unanimous All-American and won the Doak Walker Award for the nation's best running back. He led the Big 12 in rushing yards and rushing touchdowns. He finished in ninth place in Heisman Trophy voting. At the end of the season, he declared for the NFL draft.

== Professional career ==
Pre-draft measurables
| Height | Weight | Arm length | Hand span | Wingspan | 40-yard dash | 10-yard split | 20-yard split | Vertical jump | Broad jump |
|---|---|---|---|---|---|---|---|---|---|
| 5 ft 11 in (1.80 m) | 215 lb (98 kg) | 31 1/8 in (0.79 m) | 9 3/4 in (0.25 m) | 6 ft 2 3/4 in (1.90 m) | 4.46 s | 1.52 s | 2.56 s | 37.0 in (0.94 m) | 10 ft 4 in (3.15 m) |
All values from NFL Combine

=== 2023 ===
Robinson was selected by the Atlanta Falcons in the first round with the eighth overall pick in the 2023 NFL draft. On May 12, 2023, Robinson signed his four-year rookie contract worth $21.96 million fully guaranteed.

Robinson made his NFL debut in Week 1 against the Carolina Panthers. In the game, Robinson rushed for 56 yards and had six receptions for 27 yards and his first career receiving touchdown in the 24–10 win. In Week 2 against the Green Bay Packers, Robinson ran for 129 yards and had four receptions for 48 yards in the 25–24 comeback win. In the regular season finale against the New Orleans Saints, he had seven receptions for 103 yards and a receiving touchdown in the 48–17 loss. He started in 16 games as a rookie. He finished with 214 carries for 976 rushing yards and four rushing touchdowns to go with 58 receptions for 487 receiving yards and four receiving touchdowns. He was named to the PFWA All-Rookie Team.

=== 2024 ===
In Week 10 of the 2024 season, Robinson had 20 carries for 116 yards and two touchdowns in a 20–17 loss to the New Orleans Saints. In Week 15, a 15–9 win over the Las Vegas Raiders, he had 22 carries for 125 yards. In Week 18, Robinson had 28 carries for 170 yards and two touchdowns in the 44–38 overtime loss to the Carolina Panthers. In the 2024 season, Robinson had 304 carries for 1,456 rushing yards and 14 rushing touchdowns to go with 61 receptions for 431 receiving yards and one receiving touchdown. He had 12 games with over 100 scrimmage yards and five games with two rushing touchdowns. He finished third in the NFL in rushing yards and fifth in rushing touchdowns. He was ranked 62nd by his fellow players on the NFL Top 100 Players of 2025.

=== 2025 ===
In Week 1 of the 2025 season, Robinson had 124 scrimmage yards and a receiving touchdown in a 23–20 loss to the Tampa Bay Buccaneers. In Week 2, he had 22 carries for 143 yards in a 22–6 win over the Minnesota Vikings. Through Week 5, Robinson had 822 scrimmage yards, the fourth-most by any player in the first five games of a season in the Super Bowl era. He was named NFC Offensive Player of the Month for September. In Week 6, Robinson had 170 rushing yards, including an 81-yard touchdown run and 68 receiving yards in a 24–14 win over the Buffalo Bills, earning NFC Offensive Player of the Week. In Week 11, a 30–27 overtime loss to the Carolina Panthers, he had 143 scrimmage yards and two rushing touchdowns. In Week 13, a 27–24 win over the New York Jets, he had 193 scrimmage yards and a rushing touchdown in the 27–24 loss. In Week 15, a 29–28 win over the Buccaneers, he had 175 scrimmage yards and a rushing touchdown. In Week 16, a 26–19 win over the Arizona Cardinals, he had 168 scrimmage yards and a receiving touchdown. In Week 17, recorded 229 scrimmage yards and two touchdowns, highlighted by a 93-yard score, in a 27–24 win over the Los Angeles Rams, earning his second NFC Offensive Player of the Week honor of the season. He finished the 2025 season with 287 carries for 1,487 rushing yards and seven rushing touchdowns to go with 79 receptions for 820 receiving yards and four receiving touchdowns. Robinson's rushing yards total was the most for the Falcons in a single season since Michael Turner in the 2008 season. His 2,298 scrimmage yards in a single season marked the most in Falcons history and was the 12th most all time for a single season. He was selected to the Pro Bowl. Also, Robinson was selected first team All-Pro for the first time.

=== 2026 ===
On April 10, 2026, the Falcons exercised the fifth-year option of Robinson's rookie contract. On August 4, the Falcons signed Robinson to a three-year contract extension worth up to $75 million, with $51 million guaranteed, making him the highest paid running back in NFL history for around a day before Jahymrr Gibbs was extended, whilst surpassing Saquon Barkley. Additionally, the $51 million guaranteed is also the highest ever amount for running backs signing a non-rookie contract. In Week 3 against the Green Bay Packers, Bijan recorded 213 scrimmage yards and two touchdowns, becoming the first player in NFL history to record more than 150 scrimmage yards and a touchdown in five consecutive road games. He was subsequently named NFC Offensive Player of the Week for his performance.

== Career statistics ==
Legend
| | Led the league |
| **Bold** | Career high |

=== NFL ===
| Year | Team | Games | | Rushing | | | | | Receiving | | | | | Fumbles | |
| Year | Team | GP | GS | Att | Yds | Avg | Lng | TD | Rec | Yds | Avg | Lng | TD | Fum | Lost |
|---|---|---|---|---|---|---|---|---|---|---|---|---|---|---|---|
| 2023 | ATL | 17 | 16 | 214 | 976 | 4.6 | 38 | 4 | 58 | 487 | 8.4 | **71** | **4** | **4** | **3** |
| 2024 | ATL | 17 | 17 | **304** | 1,456 | 4.8 | 37 | **14** | 61 | 431 | 7.1 | 29 | 1 | 1 | 0 |
| 2025 | ATL | 17 | 17 | 287 | **1,478** | 5.1 | **93** | 7 | **79** | **820** | **10.4** | 69 | **4** | **4** | **3** |
| 2026 | ATL | 10 | 10 | 185 | 951 | **5.1** | 59 | 6 | 35 | 256 | 7.3 | 24 | 1 | **4** | 0 |
| Career | | 61 | 60 | 990 | 4,861 | 4.9 | 93 | 31 | 233 | 1,994 | 8.6 | 71 | 10 | 13 | 6 |

=== College ===
| Year | Team | GP | Rushing | | | | | Receiving | | |
| Year | Team | GP | Att | Yds | Avg | Lng | TD | Rec | Yds | TD |
|---|---|---|---|---|---|---|---|---|---|---|
| 2020 | Texas | 9 | 86 | 703 | **8.2** | 75 | 4 | 15 | 196 | 2 |
| 2021 | Texas | 10 | 195 | 1,127 | 5.8 | 62 | 11 | **26** | 295 | **4** |
| 2022 | Texas | 12 | **258** | **1,580** | 6.1 | **78** | **18** | 19 | **314** | 2 |
| Total | | 31 | 539 | 3,410 | 6.3 | 78 | 33 | 60 | 805 | 8 |

== Personal life ==
Robinson is a Christian. Robinson was named by his mother after the Iranian fashion designer Bijan, the Persian word for hero. His great uncle is Paul Robinson, a former running back who played for the Cincinnati Bengals, Houston Oilers, and Birmingham Americans. In 2022, Robinson began promoting his gourmet, Texas-based dijon mustard brand, Bijan Mustardson, along with a comedically themed line of accompanying merchandise and advertisements.
