= Ian Cunningham =

American football player and executive (born 1985)

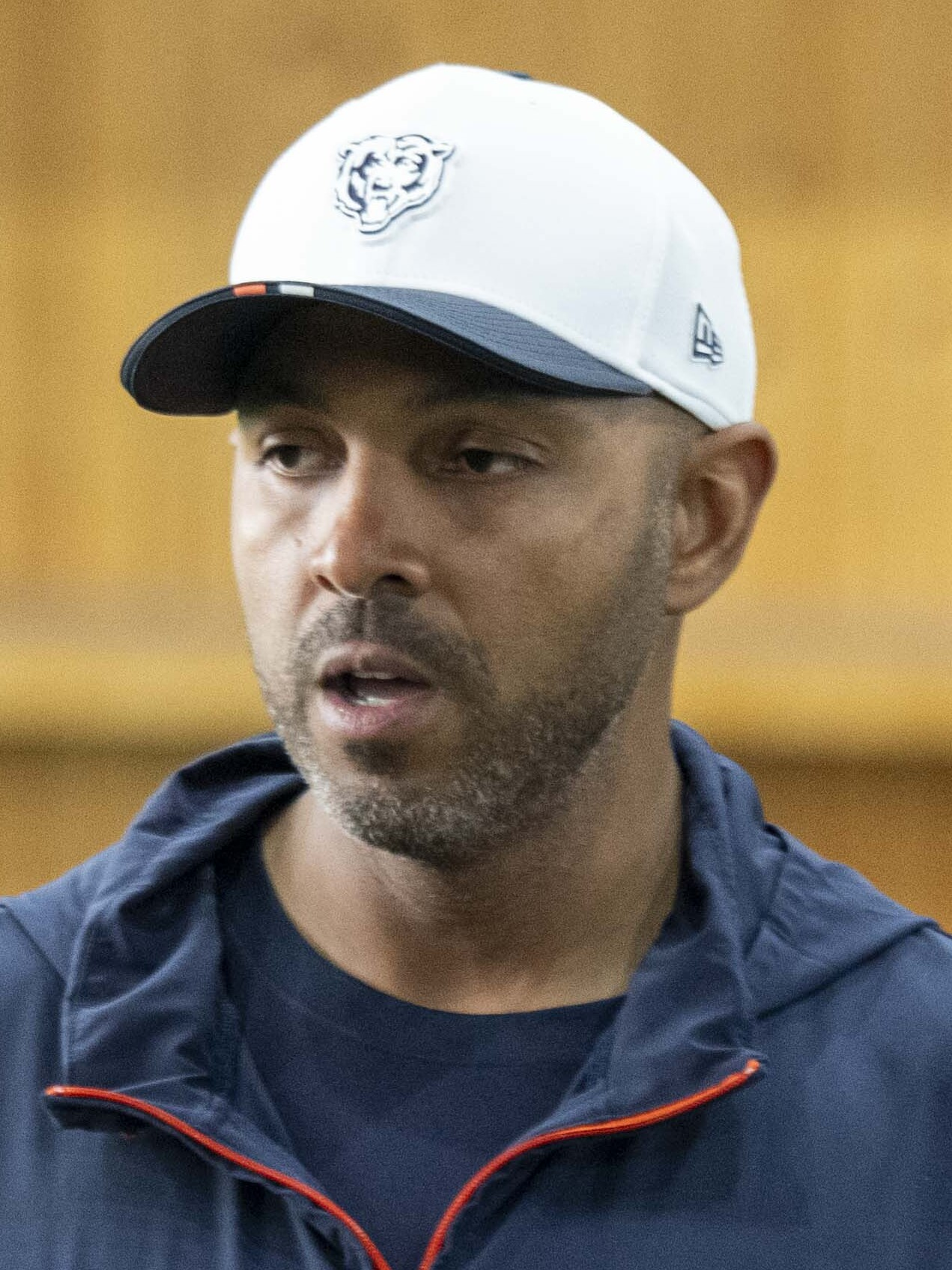
- Cunningham with the Chicago Bears in 2025

Atlanta Falcons
- Title: General manager

Personal information
- Born: May 3, 1985 (age 41)
- Listed height: 6 ft 3 in (1.91 m)
- Listed weight: 296 lb (134 kg)

Career information
- Position: Guard
- High school: Hebron (Carrollton, Texas)
- College: Virginia (2003–2007)
- NFL draft: 2008: undrafted

Career history

Playing
- Kansas City Chiefs (2008)*
- * Offseason or practice squad member only

Operations
- Baltimore Ravens (2008–2016); Personnel assistant (2008–2012); Area scout (2013–2016); Philadelphia Eagles (2017–2021); Director of college scouting (2017–2018); Assistant director of player personnel (2019–2020); Director of player personnel (2021); Chicago Bears (2022–2025) Assistant general manager; Atlanta Falcons (2026–present) General manager

Awards and highlights
- 2× Super Bowl champion (XLVII, LII)
- Executive profile at Pro Football Reference

Ian-Yates Cunningham (born May 3, 1985) is an American professional football executive and former player who is the general manager of the Atlanta Falcons of the National Football League (NFL). He played college football for the Virginia Cavaliers and was signed by the Kansas City Chiefs as an undrafted free agent in 2008. After a short stint with the Chiefs, Cunningham became an executive, starting with the Baltimore Ravens and later with the Philadelphia Eagles and Chicago Bears before being named general manager of the Falcons in 2026.

== Early life ==
Cunningham grew up in Carrollton, Texas. His father, Louis, was an agent at ProServ, which helped represent Michael Jordan and Patrick Ewing, while his second cousin was tennis player Arthur Ashe. Cunningham attended Hebron High School in Carrollton, Texas and played football, receiving many all-area and all-state honors while being selected to play in the All-American Bowl.

Cunningham enrolled at the University of Virginia in 2003 and started five games as a true freshman before suffering a ruptured disk that required surgery. He was selected honorable mention Freshman All-American by Rivals.com and also earned Freshman All-Atlantic Coast Conference (ACC) honors from The Sporting News. He redshirted in 2004 while recovering from injury. After seeing limited action at center in 2005, Cunningham moved to guard in 2006 and was a starter for his last two years, finishing his career with 31 career starts.

Cunningham was signed by the Kansas City Chiefs as an undrafted free agent following the 2008 NFL draft, but did not make the final roster.

== Executive career ==
=== Baltimore Ravens ===
Shortly after being released by the Chiefs, Cunningham joined the Baltimore Ravens as a personnel assistant in 2008. While in this position, he helped the team win a Super Bowl in 2012. He was promoted from personnel assistant to area scout in 2013. He served a total of nine years with the Ravens and they made the playoffs in six of those years.

=== Philadelphia Eagles ===
In 2017, Cunningham was hired by the Philadelphia Eagles as director of college scouting and won his second Super Bowl that year. He became assistant director of player personnel in 2019 and served in the role for two years. In 2021, he received a promotion to being the Eagles director of player personnel.

Cunningham was mentioned in 2020 on a list of The Athletic's "40 under 40" for those whom it considered "the rising stars shaping the direction of the NFL."

=== Chicago Bears ===
In 2022, Cunningham was hired by the Chicago Bears as their assistant general manager under general manager Ryan Poles. He has been interviewed for general manager positions several times, including being considered a finalist in 2024 for the job for the Washington Commanders.

=== Atlanta Falcons ===
On January 29, 2026, the Atlanta Falcons hired Cunningham as their general manager.

== Personal life ==
Cunningham and his wife, Justine, have three children together. Cunningham graduated from the University of Virginia with a bachelor's degree in psychology and later received a master's degree in education and human development. While at Virginia, he also announced games for the radio station WINA.
