= Brandon Frazier (American football) =

American football player (born 2001)

Profile
- Position: Tight end

Personal information
- Born: August 14, 2001 (age 25)
- Listed height: 6 ft 7 in (2.01 m)
- Listed weight: 267 lb (121 kg)

Career information
- High school: McKinney North (McKinney, Texas)
- College: Auburn (2021–2025)
- NFL draft: 2026: undrafted

Career history
- Atlanta Falcons (2026)*
- * Offseason or practice squad member only

Brandon Frazier is an American professional football tight end. He played college football for the Auburn Tigers.

== Early life ==
Frazier attended McKinney North High School in McKinney, Texas. As a senior, he hauled in 40 passes for 879 yards and seven touchdowns. Frazier initially committed to play college football for the Arkansas Razorbacks over offers from other schools such as Alabama, Baylor, Nebraska, Oklahoma State, SMU, TCU, and Wisconsin. However, he later de-committed from the Razorbacks and picked up more offers from schools like Florida State, Maryland, Oregon State, Pittsburgh, USC, and Virginia Tech. Ultimately, Frazier signed to play for the Auburn Tigers.

== College career ==
Over his six-year collegiate career from 2020 to 2025, Frazier appeared in 55 games despite suffering several injuries, mainly as a blocking tight end, hauling in 25 passes for 218 yards and two touchdowns. After the conclusion of the 2025 season, he declared for the NFL draft and accepted an invite to participate in the 2026 Hula Bowl.

== Professional career ==
After not being selected in the 2026 NFL draft, Frazier signed with the Atlanta Falcons as an undrafted free agent on May 7, 2026, but was waived four days later.
