= Terry Fontenot =

American football executive (born 1980)

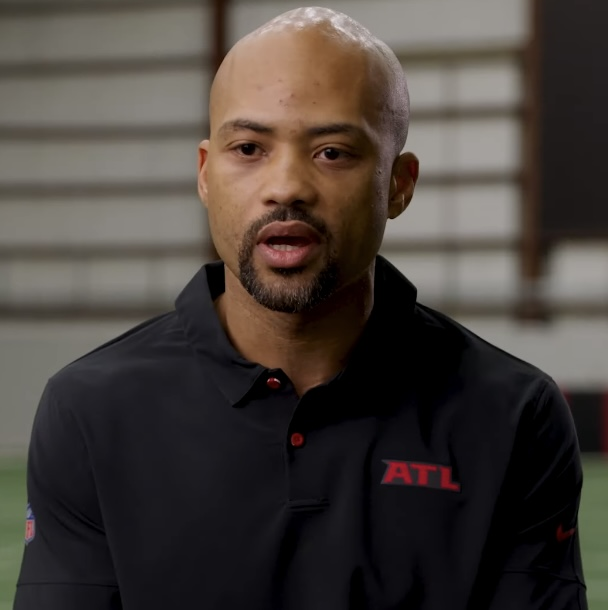
- Fontenot as Atlanta Falcons general manager, 2021

Personal information
- Born: December 16, 1980 (age 45); Lake Charles, Louisiana, U.S.

Career information
- Position: Safety
- High school: LaGrange (Lake Charles)
- College: Tulane

Career history
- New Orleans Saints (2003–2012) Scout; New Orleans Saints (2013–2019) Director of pro scouting; New Orleans Saints (2020) Assistant general manager & vice president of pro personnel; Atlanta Falcons (2021–2025) General manager

Awards and highlights
- Super Bowl champion (XLIV)
- Executive profile at Pro Football Reference

Terry Houston Fontenot (born December 16, 1980) is an American professional football executive who was most recently the general manager of the Atlanta Falcons of the National Football League (NFL). Fontenot previously served with the New Orleans Saints in various executive roles throughout the 2000s and 2010s. He previously played college football at Tulane.

== Early years and playing career ==
Terry was one of seven children born to Roy and Jacquetta Fontenot in Lake Charles, Louisiana. He went to LaGrange High School, where he graduated in 1999 after lettering in football, track and baseball.

=== College ===
Fontenot played four years at strong safety for Tulane from 1999 to 2002, serving as a captain in 2001. He graduated with a bachelor's degree in business and organizational information technology.

== Executive career ==
=== New Orleans Saints ===
In 2003, Fontenot was hired by the New Orleans Saints as a scout. In 2013, Fontenot was promoted to director of pro scouting. In 2020, Fontenot was once again promoted to assistant general manager and vice president of pro personnel.

=== Atlanta Falcons ===
On January 19, 2021, Fontenot was named the general manager of the Atlanta Falcons. Fontenot is the first black general manager in Falcons history.

In June 2024, the NFL fined Fontenot $50,000 for violating the anti-tampering policy after the league's investigation into the signing of quarterback Kirk Cousins in the 2024 offseason.

On January 4, 2026, following the 2025 season, Fontenot was relieved of his duties, along with head coach Raheem Morris. During his five-year tenure with Atlanta, Fontenot compiled a 36–48 record.
