= Justin Hood (American football) =

American football player and coach (born 1986)

Atlanta Falcons
- Title: Secondary coach

Personal information
- Born: June 27, 1986 (age 40); Youngstown, Ohio, U.S.

Career information
- Position: Cornerback
- College: Ashland

Career history
- Illinois (2013) Graduate assistant; Capital (2014) Defensive coordinator; Davidson (2015–2017) Safeties coach; Davidson (2017) Interim head coach; Western Carolina (2018) Linebackers coach; Kent State (2019–2020) Secondary coach; Green Bay Packers (2021–2023) Defensive quality control coach; Atlanta Falcons (2024–present) Secondary coach

Justin Hood (born June 27, 1986) is an American football coach and former player who is the secondary coach for the Atlanta Falcons of the National Football League (NFL). Hood was previously the defensive quality control coach for the Green Bay Packers.

== College career ==
Hood played college football at Ashland University, where he played cornerback. While playing there, he was named to the All-Great Lakes Intercollegiate Athletic Conference Team.

== Coaching career ==
Following his college football career and stints as an intern for Oregon and the New York Giants, Hood became a graduate assistant for Illinois in 2013.

After spending one year at Illinois, Hood became the defensive coordinator for the Capital University football team in 2014.

Following that position, in 2015, Hood was named the safeties coach for Davidson. During the 2017 season, Hood was temporarily named interim head coach after the firing of Paul Nichols.

Hood next coached for Western Carolina in 2018, where he was the linebackers coach and was named to the 35 Under 35 Leadership Institute.

After a year at Western Carolina, Hood joined Kent State in 2019 to become their secondary coach.

Following two years at Kent State, Hood received his first NFL coaching job as the defensive quality control coach for the Green Bay Packers in 2021.

In 2024, Hood joined the Atlanta Falcons as the secondary coach following three years with the Packers.
