= Will Harris (American football) =

American football player (born 1995)

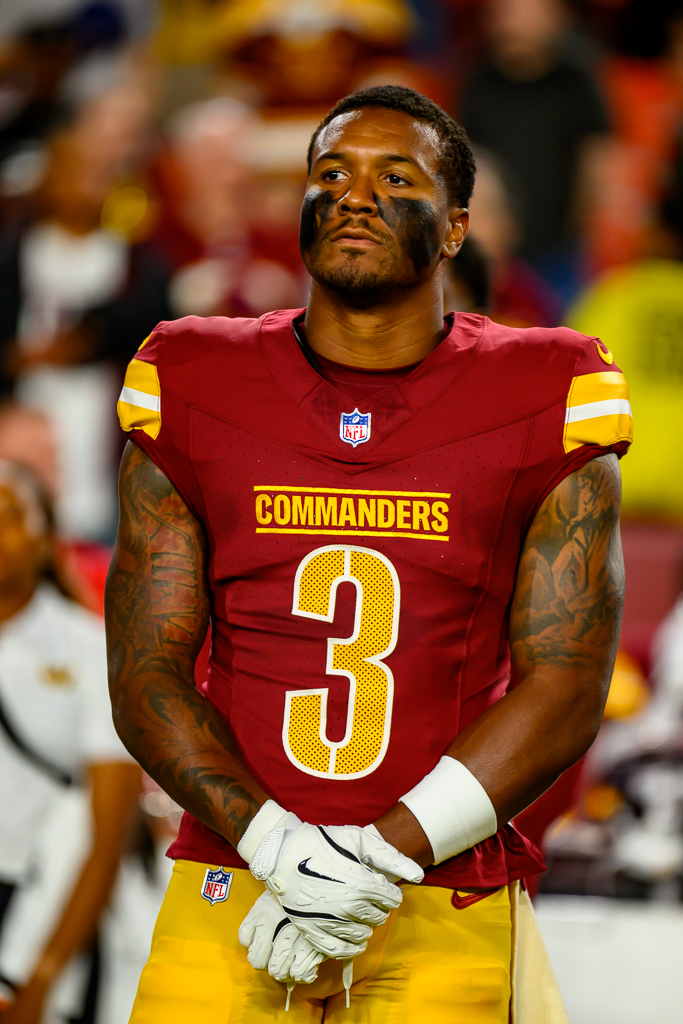
- Harris with the Washington Commanders in 2025

Profile
- Position: Safety

Personal information
- Born: December 19, 1995 (age 30); Suwanee, Georgia, U.S.
- Listed height: 6 ft 1 in (1.85 m)
- Listed weight: 206 lb (93 kg)

Career information
- High school: Choate Rosemary Hall (Wallingford, Connecticut)
- College: Boston College (2015–2018)
- NFL draft: 2019: 3rd round, 81st overall pick

Career history
- Detroit Lions (2019–2023); New Orleans Saints (2024); Washington Commanders (2025)

Career NFL statistics as of 2025
- Tackles: 358
- Sacks: 2.5
- Pass deflections: 22
- Interceptions: 3
- Forced fumbles: 3
- Fumble recoveries: 2
- Stats at Pro Football Reference

William Jamahl Harris (born December 19, 1995) is an American professional football safety. He played college football for the Boston College Eagles and was selected by the Detroit Lions in the third round of the 2019 NFL draft. Harris has also played for the New Orleans Saints and Washington Commanders.

== Professional career ==
=== Pre-draft ===
Pro Football Focus ranked Harris as the 10th best safety prospect in the draft. Sports Illustrated ranked Harris the 28th best defensive back (141st overall) prospect in the draft. NFL draft analyst Matt Miller of Bleacher Report had Harris listed as the 13th best safety in the draft. NFL draft analysts and scouts projections for him varied from as early as the third round to as late as the sixth round.

External videos
- Will Harris runs a 4.41s 40-yard dash

Pre-draft measurables
Height	Weight	Arm length	Hand span	Wingspan	40-yard dash	10-yard split	20-yard split	20-yard shuttle	Three-cone drill	Vertical jump	Broad jump	Bench press
6 ft 1 in (1.85 m)	207 lb (94 kg)	31 1/4 in (0.79 m)	9 in (0.23 m)	6 ft 2 3/4 in (1.90 m)	4.41 s	1.54 s	2.59 s	4.12 s	6.91 s	36.5 in (0.93 m)	10 ft 3 in (3.12 m)	20 reps
All values from NFL Combine

=== Detroit Lions ===
==== 2019 ====
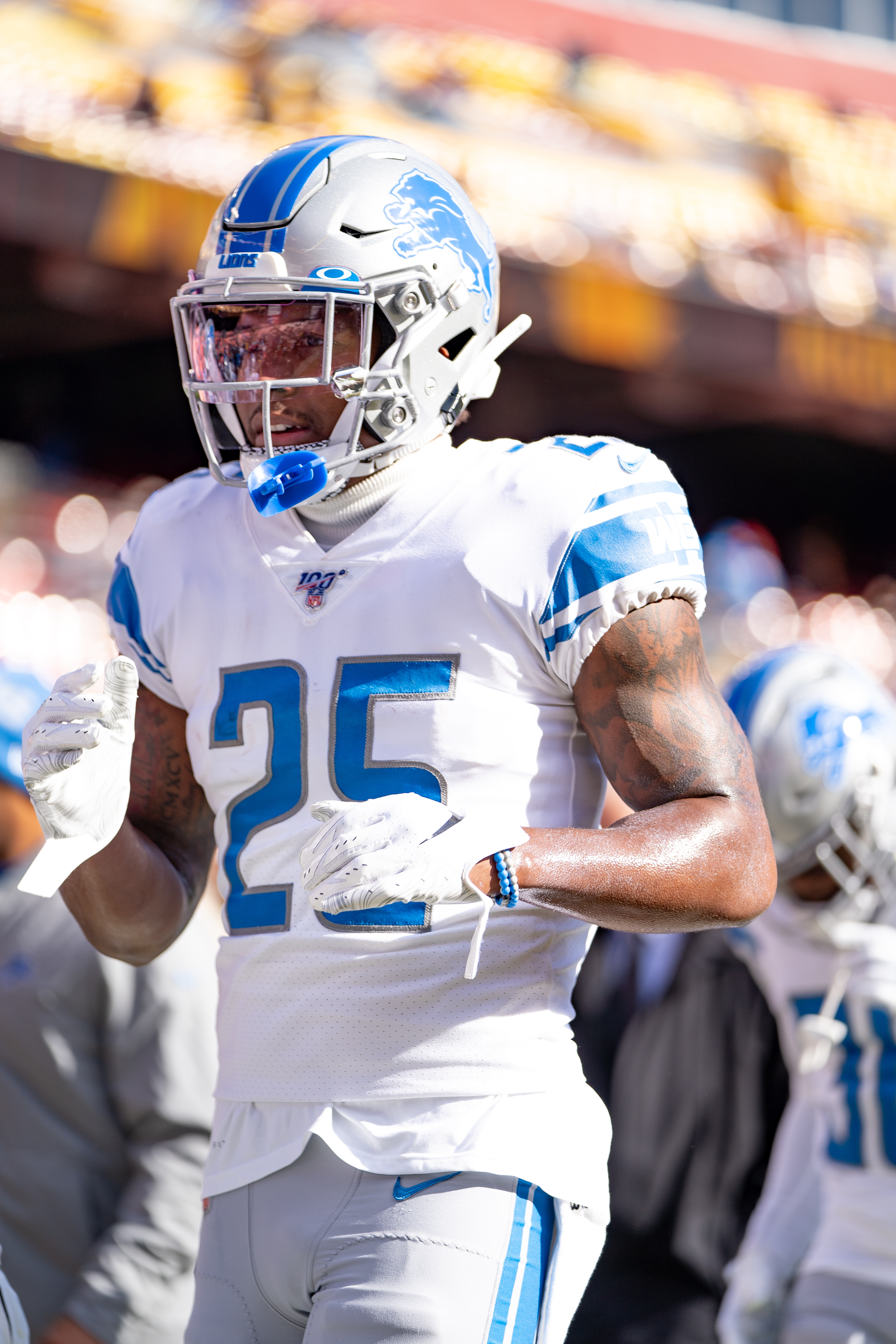
Harris with the Detroit Lions in 2019

The Detroit Lions selected Harris in the third round (81st overall) in the 2019 NFL draft. The Lions executed a trade with the Minnesota Vikings in order to secure their ability to immediately draft Harris, trading their third-round (88th overall) and sixth-round picks (204th overall) in the 2019 NFL Draft in return for the Vikings' 2019 third-round pick (81st overall) used by Detroit to draft Harris. The Minnesota Vikings went on to trade both of the picks to the, Seattle Seahawks. He was the seventh safety drafted in 2019. He was reunited with Lions' defensive coordinator Paul Pasqualoni, who formerly held the position of defensive line coach at Boston College.

External videos
- Detroit Lions select Will Harris No. 81

On June 4, 2019, the Lions signed Harris to a four–year, $3.72 million rookie contract that includes a signing bonus of $952,244. Throughout training camp, Harris competed against Tavon Wilson, Charles Washington, and Andrew Adams to be a primary backup safety. Head coach Matt Patricia named Harris a backup safety, behind starting safeties Tracy Walker III and Quandre Diggs to begin the regular season.

On September 8, 2019, Harris made his professional regular season debut during the Detroit Lions' season–opener at the Arizona Cardinals, but was limited to one solo tackle as they tied 27–27. In Week 6, he collected a season-high seven combined tackles (three solo) during a 22–23 loss at the Green Bay Packers. On November 3, 2019, Harris earned his first career start after Tracy Walker injured his knee. He recorded five combined tackles (two solo) during a 24–31 loss at the Oakland Raiders. In Week 17, he made four solo tackles, a pass deflection, and had his first career sack on Aaron Rodgers as the Lions lost 20–23 to the Green Bay Packers. He finished his rookie season in 2019 with a total of 43 combined tackles (30 solo), three pass deflections, and a sack in 16 games and six starts.

==== 2020 ====
He entered training camp as a candidate to possibly earn a role as the starting safety following the departure of Quandre Diggs, but was challenged for the position by Duron Harmon. The Lions hired Cory Undlin to be their defensive coordinator following the departure of Paul Pasqualoni after the 2019 NFL season. Head coach Matt Patricia named him the primary backup safety on the depth chart, behind starting safeties Tracy Walker III and Duron Harmon. Although he was listed as a backup, Harris would start in lieu of Tracy Walker and split defensive snaps with Walker for the first three games.

On September 13, 2020, Harris started in the Detroit Lions' home-opener against the Chicago Bears and set a season-high five solo tackles during a 23–27 loss. After struggling in Week 2 at the Green Bay Packers, he was relegated to serve as a backup and was replaced by Tracy Walker III. On November 28, 2020, the Lions officially fired head coach Matt Patricia after a disappointing 4–7 record to begin the season. Offensive coordinator Darrell Bevell was appointed to interim head coach for the remainder of the season. He finished the season with 35 combined tackles (26 solo) and had one pass deflection in 16 games and five starts.

==== 2021 ====
On January 20, 2021, the Detroit Lions announced their decision to hire New Orleans Saints' tight ends coach Dan Campbell to be their head coach. Throughout training camp, defensive coordinator Aaron Glenn held a competition between Harris and Dean Marlowe in order to find a replacement for Duron Harmon as a starting safety. He was named a starting safety to begin the season and was paired with Tracy Walker III.

In Week 14, he set a season-high with nine combined tackles (two solo) and had one pass deflection during a 10–38 loss at the Denver Broncos. On January 9, 2022, he set a season-high with eight solo tackles (nine combined) as the Lions defeated the Green Bay Packers. He started all 17 games for the first time in his career and had a total of 93 combined tackles (52 solo), four passes defensed, and a forced fumble. He split his time between safety, nickel, and outside cornerback due to multiple injuries and teammates contracting COVID-19.

==== 2022 ====
He was placed at cornerback during training camp after the Lions acquired three new safeties during the off-season, drafting Kerby Joseph and signing free agents DeShon Elliott and JuJu Hughes. After he was surpassed on the depth chart at cornerback by Jeff Okudah, Amani Oruwariye, and Mike Hughes, defensive back coach Aubrey Pleasant insisted Harris would instead remain as a “defensive back”, as he was someone they felt could comfortably play at multiple spots. Head coach Dan Campbell named him a backup safety and nickelback and he was listed as the fourth safety on the depth chart, behind Tracy Walker III, DeShon Elliott, and Juju Hughes.

On September 18, 2022, Harris started at nickelback following an injury to Amani Oruwariye in Week 1 and he set a season-high with eight combined tackles (five solo), made one pass deflection, and had his first career interception on a pass by Carson Wentz to tight end Logan Thomas during a 27–36 victory against the Washington Commanders. He was inactive for the Lions' 6–24 loss at the Dallas Cowboys in Week 7 due to a hip injury. In Week 11, he tied his season-high of eight combined tackles (five solo) and forced a fumble during a 31–18 victory at the New York Giants. He was inactive as the Lions defeated the Minnesota Vikings 34–23 in Week 14 after re-injuring his hip. He finished the season with a total of 57 combined tackles (44 solo), four pass deflections, one fumble recovery, and one interception in 15 games and 10 starts. He received an overall grade of 63.7 from Pro Football Focus in 2022.

==== 2023 ====
On March 14, 2023, the Detroit Lions signed Harris to a fully-guaranteed one–year, $2.58 million contract that includes an initial signing bonus of $152,500. Entering training camp, defensive coordinator Aaron Glenn sought to move Harris to cornerback with him primarily focusing on the slot after the Lions acquired safeties C. J. Gardner-Johnson and rookie Brian Branch to add alongside Tracy Walker III and Kerby Joseph. He became a candidate to become the starting nickelback competing against Brian Branch after C. J. Gardner-Johnson injured his knee during OTAs. Head coach Dan Campbell named him a backup and listed him as the No. 2 nickelback to begin the season, behind Brian Branch.

In Week 5, Harris earned his first start of the season as a nickelback, replacing Brian Branch who was inactive due to an ankle injury he suffered the previous week. Harris set a season-high with nine combined tackles (five solo), made one pass deflection, and had a fumble recovery during a 24–42 victory against the Carolina Panthers. On October 15, 2023, Harris made four combined tackles (two solo), a pass deflection, and had his only interception of the season on a pass by Baker Mayfield to wide receiver Mike Evans during a 20–6 win at the Tampa Bay Buccaneers. Although he appeared in all 17 games, Harris was limited to two starts and finished with a total of 18 combined tackles (12 solo), three pass deflections, one fumble recovery, and one interception.

=== New Orleans Saints ===
On May 1, 2024, the New Orleans Saints signed Harris to a one–year, $1.29 million contract that includes $491,500 guaranteed upon signing and an initial signing bonus of $167,500. Throughout training camp, he competed to be a starting safety against Johnathan Abram and Jordan Howden, seeking to replace Marcus Maye following his departure. Head coach Dennis Allen listed him as a backup to begin the season, but he began the season as the starting strong safety alongside Tyrann Mathieu.

On September 8, 2024, Harris started in the New Orleans Saints' home-opener against the Carolina Panthers and made two tackles, one pass deflection, and had his only interception of the season on the first offensive play of the season on a pass attempt by Bryce Young to wide receiver Diontae Johnson as they won 47–10. He was inactive for four consecutive games (Weeks 6–9) due to a hamstring injury. On November 4, 2024, the Saints fired head coach Dennis Allen after a 2–7 start and appointed special teams coordinator Darren Rizzi to interim head coach. In Week 18, he set a season-high with eight solo tackles and had one pass deflection during a 19–27 loss at the Tampa Bay Buccaneers. He finished the 2024 NFL season with a total of 74 combined tackles (54 solo), five passes defensed, and one interception in 13 games and 13 starts. He received an overall grade of 61.5 from Pro Football Focus, which ranked 103rd amongst 171 qualifying safeties in 2024.

=== Washington Commanders ===
On March 13, 2025, the Washington Commanders signed Harris to a two-year, $8 million contract that includes $3.39 million guaranteed upon signing and a signing bonus of $2 million. On September 22, the Commanders placed him on injured reserve after suffering a fractured fibula in Week 3. Harris was activated ahead of the team's Week 13 matchup against the Denver Broncos.

Harris was released by the Commanders ahead of final roster cuts on August 25, 2026.

== NFL career statistics ==
=== Regular season ===
Year	Team	Games		Tackles				Interceptions						Fumbles			
Year	Team	GP	GS	Comb	Solo	Ast	Sack	Int	Yds	Avg	Lng	TD	PD	FF	FR	Yds	TD
2019	DET	16	6	43	30	13	1.0	0	—	—	—	—	3	0	0	—	—
2020	DET	16	5	35	26	9	0.0	0	—	—	—	—	1	0	0	—	—
2021	DET	17	17	93	62	31	0.5	0	—	—	—	—	4	1	0	—	—
2022	DET	15	10	57	44	13	0.0	1	0	0.0	0	0	4	1	1	0	0
2023	DET	17	2	18	12	6	0.0	1	0	0.0	0	0	2	0	1	3	0
2024	NO	13	13	74	54	20	0.0	1	7	7.0	7	0	5	0	0	—	—
2025	WAS	9	9	38	22	16	1.0	0	—	—	—	—	3	1	0	—	—
Career		103	62	358	250	108	2.5	3	7	2.3	7	0	22	3	2	3	0
Source: pro-football-reference.com

=== Postseason ===
Year	Team	Games		Tackles				Interceptions						Fumbles			
Year	Team	GP	GS	Comb	Solo	Ast	Sack	Int	Yds	Avg	Lng	TD	PD	FF	FR	Yds	TD
2023	DET	3	0	1	0	1	0.0	0	—	—	—	—	0	0	0	—	—
Career		3	0	1	0	1	0.0	0	0	0	0	0	0	0	0	0	0
Source: pro-football-reference.com
