= Tyrann Mathieu =

American football player (born 1992)

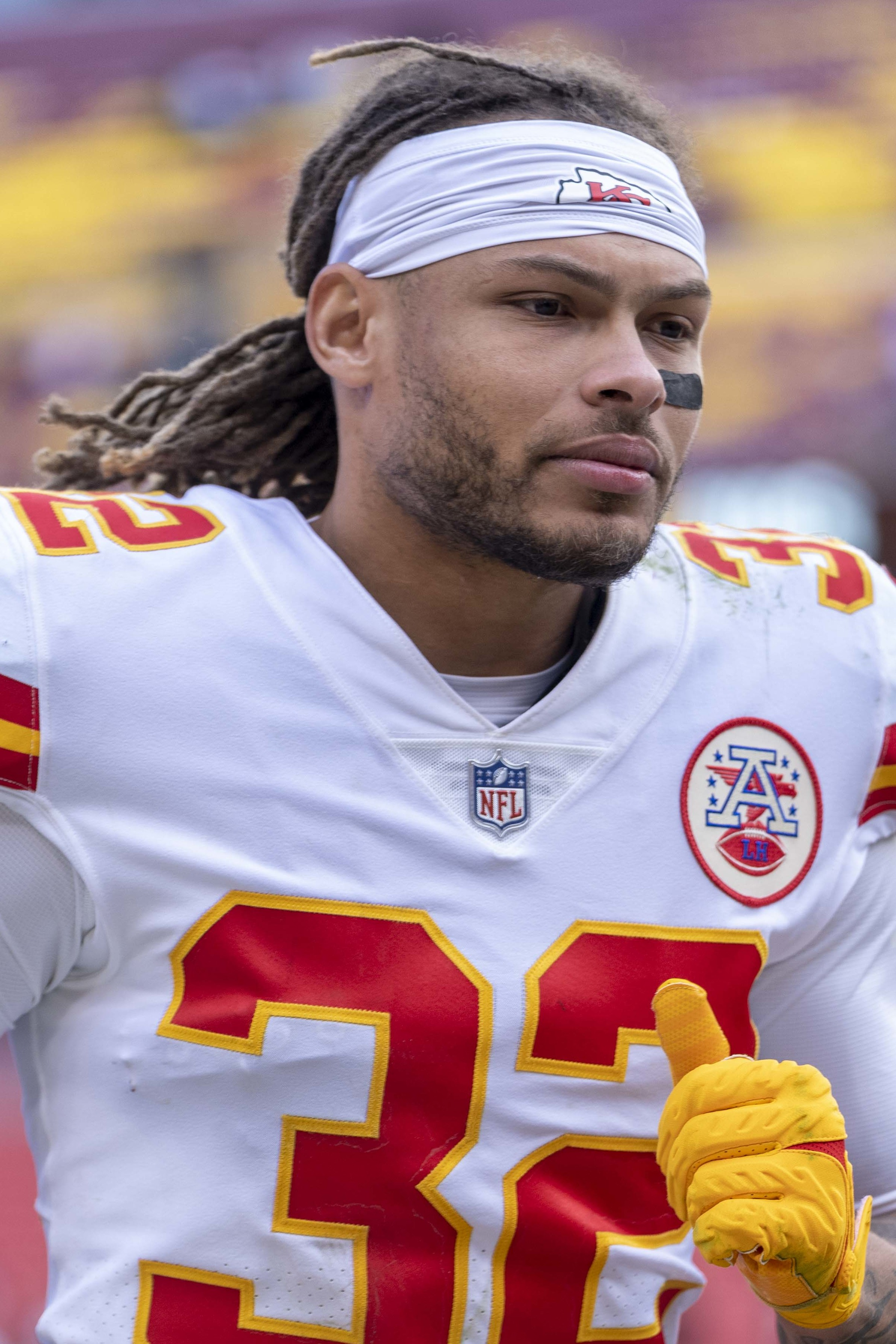
- Mathieu with the Kansas City Chiefs in 2021

No. 32
- Position: Safety

Personal information
- Born: May 13, 1992 (age 34); New Orleans, Louisiana, U.S.
- Listed height: 5 ft 9 in (1.75 m)
- Listed weight: 190 lb (86 kg)

Career information
- High school: St. Augustine (New Orleans)
- College: LSU (2010–2011)
- NFL draft: 2013: 3rd round, 69th overall pick

Career history
- Arizona Cardinals (2013–2017); Houston Texans (2018); Kansas City Chiefs (2019–2021); New Orleans Saints (2022–2024)

Awards and highlights
- Super Bowl champion (LIV); 3× First-team All-Pro (2015, 2019 (Note: Selected as a Defensive Back), 2020); Second-team All-Pro (2019) (Note: Selected as a Safety); 3× Pro Bowl (2015, 2020, 2021); NFL 2010s All-Decade Team; PFWA All-Rookie Team (2013); Chuck Bednarik Award (2011); SEC Defensive Player of the Year (2011); Consensus All-American (2011); First-team All-SEC (2011); Second-team AP All-Time All-American (2025)

Career NFL statistics
- Total tackles: 838
- Sacks: 11.0
- Forced fumbles: 7
- Fumble recoveries: 8
- Pass deflections: 100
- Interceptions: 36
- Defensive touchdowns: 4
- Stats at Pro Football Reference

Tyrann Devine Mathieu (/ˈtaɪrən ˈmæθ.juː/; born May 13, 1992) is an American former professional football safety who played 12 seasons in the National Football League (NFL). Nicknamed "the Honey Badger" (after the mammal of the same name), Mathieu played college football for the LSU Tigers where he gained a reputation for causing turnovers, setting a Southeastern Conference record with 11 career forced fumbles. As a sophomore, he won the Chuck Bednarik Award as the best defensive player in college football, was a finalist for the Heisman Trophy, and was recognized as a consensus All-American. Mathieu was dismissed from the LSU football program after that season due to a violation of team rules.

After spending a year out of football in 2012, he was selected by the Arizona Cardinals in the third round of the 2013 NFL draft, reuniting him in the defensive backfield with former college teammate Patrick Peterson. He was named to the PFWA All-Rookie Team and earned three invitations to the Pro Bowl. Mathieu has also been selected to the first-team All-Pro team three times and the second-team All-Pro team once, having been selected to both in 2019 (as a first-team defensive back and a second-team safety). Mathieu also played for the Houston Texans, Kansas City Chiefs (where he was a member of the team that won Super Bowl LIV), and New Orleans Saints.

== Early life ==
A native of New Orleans, Louisiana, Mathieu attended St. Augustine High School, where he played for the St. Augustine Purple Knights high school football team. He recorded 32 tackles, five interceptions, one sack and one fumble recovery as a senior.

While living in New Orleans' Central City, Mathieu was initially raised by his grandparents during the first five years of his life. His biological mother was absent the majority of the time and his biological father, Darrin Hayes, has been incarcerated for murder most of Mathieu's life. After his grandfather died in 1997, Mathieu was adopted by his uncle, Tyrone Mathieu, and aunt, Sheila Mathieu.

Mathieu also participated with the track and field team at St. Augustine High School. He was a member of the 4x100m relay team, and was one of Louisiana's top performers in the long jump and high jump. He recorded a personal best long jump in his final high school track meet with a mark of 23 ft 9.25 in (7.25 meters). That earned Mathieu a second-place finish at the 2010 LHSAA Track & Field State Championship. He also recorded a personal-best high jump of 6 ft 4 in (1.93 meters) in the prestigious 2010 Allstate Sugar Bowl Track & Field Classic during his senior year, finishing in second place.

Considered a four-star recruit by Rivals.com, Mathieu was listed as the No. 13 cornerback in the nation in 2010.

== College career ==
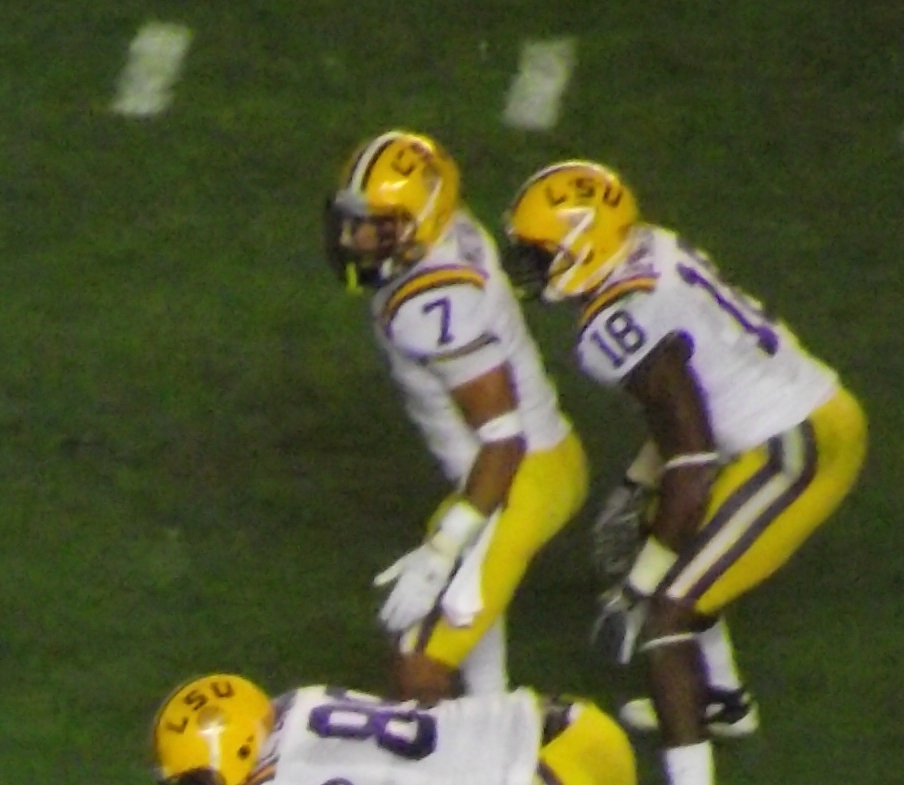
Mathieu (#7) with the LSU Tigers

Mathieu accepted an athletic scholarship to attend Louisiana State University, where he played for coach Les Miles's LSU Tigers football team from 2010 to 2011.

=== 2010 season ===
As a true freshman in 2010, Mathieu played in all 13 games with one start. He finished the season with 57 tackles, 4.5 sacks, and two interceptions. He was the Most Outstanding Defensive Player of the 2011 Cotton Bowl Classic against Texas A&M after he recorded seven tackles, one tackle for loss, two forced fumbles, one fumble recovery, one interception, one sack, and one pass breakup.

=== 2011 season ===
At the end of the 2011 regular season, Mathieu had 77 total tackles (60 solo and 17 assists), 1.5 sacks, five forced fumbles, four fumble recoveries (two returned for a touchdown), and two interceptions. On special teams, Mathieu had 26 punt returns for 420 yards, with two returned for a touchdown. On October 19, 2011, Mathieu was suspended for one game following a violation of LSU's drug policy. Mathieu was named the most valuable player of the 2011 SEC Championship Game. Mathieu earned the nickname "the Honey Badger" for his tenacious ability to play extremely tough football against much larger opponents as well as his dyed patch of blond hair on the top of his head in his college days which resembled the blond patch of hair on the back of a honey badger. This led to him being a Heisman Trophy finalist, eventually finishing fifth. On December 8, 2011, Mathieu was awarded the Chuck Bednarik Award, given to the year's best defensive player in college football. This marked the second straight year an LSU defensive player won the nation's top defensive honor following Patrick Peterson in 2010.

=== 2012: Dismissal ===
On August 10, 2012, LSU head coach Les Miles announced that Mathieu would be dismissed from the football team due to a violation of team rules. News outlets reported that the dismissal was a result of repeated drug test failures, although Miles did not confirm those reports. Mathieu had formerly expressed an interest in returning to the program for the 2013 season. On August 17, 2012, Mathieu withdrew from LSU and entered a drug rehabilitation program in Houston, Texas. Mathieu's withdrawal was expected to last for the entire 2012–2013 academic year. However, on September 4, 2012, Mathieu ended his withdrawal and enrolled for fall semester classes. On October 25, 2012, Mathieu and three other LSU former players were arrested on possession of marijuana.

On November 29, 2012, it was announced that Mathieu would enter the NFL draft. Mathieu participated at the 2013 NFL Scouting Combine on February 26, 2013. He ran a 4.50 40-yard dash, had 4 reps of 225 pounds, a 34-inch vertical, and a 117-inch broad jump. He also later participated at his pro day on March 27, 2013.

== Professional career ==
=== Pre-draft ===
Prior to the 2012 season, Mathieu was ranked as the third best cornerback prospect in the upcoming 2013 NFL draft by NFL analyst Chad Reuter. On November 29, 2012, Mathieu stated his intentions to enter the draft. Mathieu attended the NFL Combine and completed all of the combine and positional drills. On March 28, 2013, Mathieu attended LSU's pro day, but chose to stand on his combine numbers and only performed positional drills. He was projected to be a second or third round pick by the majority of NFL draft experts and scouts. At the conclusion of the pre-draft process, Mathieu was ranked as the tenth best cornerback prospect in the draft by DraftScout.com.

External videos
- Tyrann Mathieu's NFL Combine Workout
- Tyrann Mathieu's 40-yard dash
- Mathieu's NFL Combine Interview

Pre-draft measurables
Height	Weight	Arm length	Hand span	Wingspan	40-yard dash	10-yard split	20-yard split	20-yard shuttle	Three-cone drill	Vertical jump	Broad jump	Bench press
5 ft 8 3/4 in (1.75 m)	186 lb (84 kg)	31 1/8 in (0.79 m)	9 3/8 in (0.24 m)	6 ft 0 1/4 in (1.84 m)	4.50 s	1.56 s	2.61 s	4.14 s	6.87 s	34 in (0.86 m)	9 ft 9 in (2.97 m)	4 reps
All values from NFL Combine

=== Arizona Cardinals ===
The Arizona Cardinals selected Mathieu in the third round (69th overall) of the 2013 NFL draft. Mathieu was the sixth safety drafted in 2013. On April 26, 2013, it was reported that Cardinals' head coach Bruce Arians stated that Mathieu would be playing free safety although it was widely expected he would play slot cornerback coming out of college.

External videos
- Cardinals draft Tyrann Mathieu 69th overall
- NFL Draft Profile: Tyrann Mathieu

On May 10, 2013, Mathieu stated during an interview while watching former teammates practice at the Senior Bowl that he wanted to remove himself from any association with his "Honey Badger" nickname. (see "Personal life")

==== 2013 ====
On May 23, 2013, the Arizona Cardinals signed Mathieu to a four–year, $3.05 million contract that included $817,187 guaranteed and an initial signing bonus of $265,000.

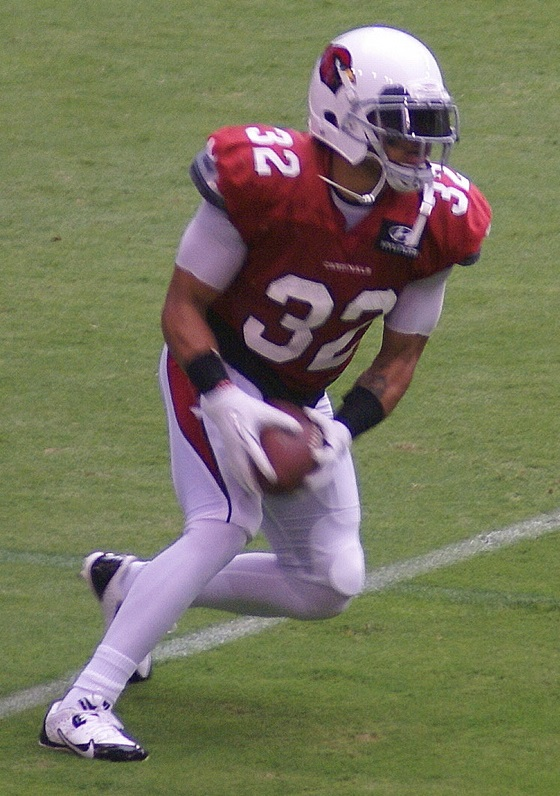
Mathieu during training camp in 2013

Throughout training camp, Mathieu competed to be the first-team nickelback and starting free safety. He competed to be a starting free safety against Yeremiah Bell and Rashad Johnson. Head coach Bruce Arians named Mathieu the backup free safety to begin the regular season, behind starting free safety Rashad Johnson and strong safety Jeremiah Bell. Defensive coordinator Todd Bowles also named him the first-team nickelback.

On September 8, 2013, Mathieu made his professional regular season debut in the Arizona Cardinals' season-opener at the St. Louis Rams and made seven solo tackles and made his first career forced fumble in their 27–24 loss. He made his first career regular-season tackle and forced a fumble on St Louis Rams' tight end Jared Cook before Cook crossed into the endzone for a touchdown and it was recovered by Cardinals' linebacker Karlos Dansby for a touchback in the first quarter. The following week, he earned his first career start as a nickelback and made six solo tackles and a pass deflection during a 25–21 victory against the Detroit Lions in Week 2. On September 22, 2013, Mathieu recorded ten combined tackles (nine solo), deflected a pass, and made his first career interception off a pass thrown by quarterback Drew Brees, that was initially intended for wide receiver Lance Moore, in the third quarter of a 31–7 loss at the New Orleans Saints. In Week 4, Mathieu earned his first career start at free safety and remained the starter for the rest of the season after Rashad Johnson sustained an injury to his finger while covering a punt the previous week. He finished the Cardinals' 13–10 win at the Tampa Bay Buccaneers in Week 4 with six solo tackles. On October 6, 2013, he recorded five solo tackles and made his first career sack on quarterback Cam Newton for a ten-yard loss in the second quarter during the Cardinals' 22–6 win against the Carolina Panthers. On December 8, 2013, Mathieu made one solo tackle and a pass deflection before exiting the Cardinals' 30–10 victory against the St. Louis Rams with a leg injury. It was later determined Mathieu tore his left ACL and LCL while returning a punt during the third quarter. On December 10, 2013, the Arizona Cardinals placed Mathieu on injured reserve officially ending his rookie season as he was inactive for the last three games (Weeks 15–17). He completed his rookie season in 2013 with 68 combined tackles (65 solo), nine pass deflections, two interceptions, a sack, and a forced fumble in 13 games and 11 starts. He was named to the PFWA All-Rookie Team.

==== 2014 ====
Mathieu was not able to participate in training camp due to his recovery. He was inactive for the Cardinals' season opener but joined the team in Week 2. Upon his return, head coach Bruce Arians named Mathieu the backup free safety behind Rashad Johnson. On September 21, 2014, Mathieu collected a season-high six combined tackles (five solo) during a 23–14 win against the San Francisco 49ers. On November 2, 2014, Mathieu recorded five combined tackles (four solo), a pass deflection, and made his lone interception of the season off a pass by Brandon Weeden to tight end Jason Witten during a 28–17 win at the Dallas Cowboys. In Week 10, Mathieu became the starting free safety and replaced Tony Jefferson in the starting lineup. On November 30, 2014, Mathieu made three combined tackles (two solo) in the Cardinals' 29–18 loss against the Atlanta Falcons, but exited in the third quarter after sustaining a thumb injury. He underwent surgery on his thumb and was expected to miss two games (Weeks 13–14). He finished the season with 39 combined tackles (35 solo), four pass deflections, an interception, and a fumble recovery in 13 games and six starts.

==== 2015 ====
Defensive coordinator Todd Bowles accepted the head coaching position with the New York Jets and was replaced by James Bettcher. Throughout training camp, Mathieu competed against Rashad Johnson to be the starting free safety. Head coach Bruce Arians officially named him the starting free safety to start the regular season, alongside strong safety Deone Bucannon.

On September 27, 2015, Mathieu had five solo tackles, two pass deflections, and a career-high two interceptions on passes by Colin Kaepernick including his first career touchdown as the Cardinals routed the San Francisco 49ers 47–7. He scored his touchdown in the first quarter after intercepting a pass by Colin Kaepernick to wide receiver Anquan Boldin and returning it 33–yards. The last time an Arizona Cardinal had two interceptions in a game was Patrick Peterson in Week 10, 2014. On November 15, 2015, he made six combined tackles (five solo), a season-high three pass deflections, and intercepted a pass thrown by Russell Wilson to wide receiver Doug Baldwin during a 39–32 win at the Seattle Seahawks. In Week 12, Mathieu collected a season-high 13 combined tackles (11 solo), broke up two passes, and intercepted a pass by Blaine Gabbert to wide receiver Quinton Patton in the Cardinals' 19–13 win at the San Francisco 49ers. On December 20, 2015, Mathieu made five combined tackles (four solo), two pass deflections, and sealed a 40–17 win at the Philadelphia Eagles with a fourth quarter interception on a pass thrown by Sam Bradford to wide receiver Riley Cooper. He tore his ACL during the interception and missed the last two games of the season (Weeks 16–17). Mathieu was named to his first Pro Bowl after the season and was named by the Associated Press as a first-team All-Pro safety. He was ranked 28th by his fellow players on the NFL Top 100 Players of 2016. He finished the season with a total of 89 combined tackles (80 solo), 17 pass deflections, five interceptions, one sack, a forced fumble, and one touchdown in 14 games and 14 starts. He received the highest overall grade of 91.6 from Pro Football Focus, which was the highest among all teammates on the Arizona Cardinals.

==== 2016 ====
On August 2, 2016, the Arizona Cardinals signed Mathieu to a five–year, $62.50 million extension that included $40.00 million guaranteed, $21.25 million guaranteed upon signing, and an initial signing bonus of $15.50 million. He missed training camp as he was still recovering from undergoing surgery to repair his torn ACL. Head coach Bruce Arians named Mathieu as the starting free safety to begin the season and paired him with strong safety D. J. Swearinger.

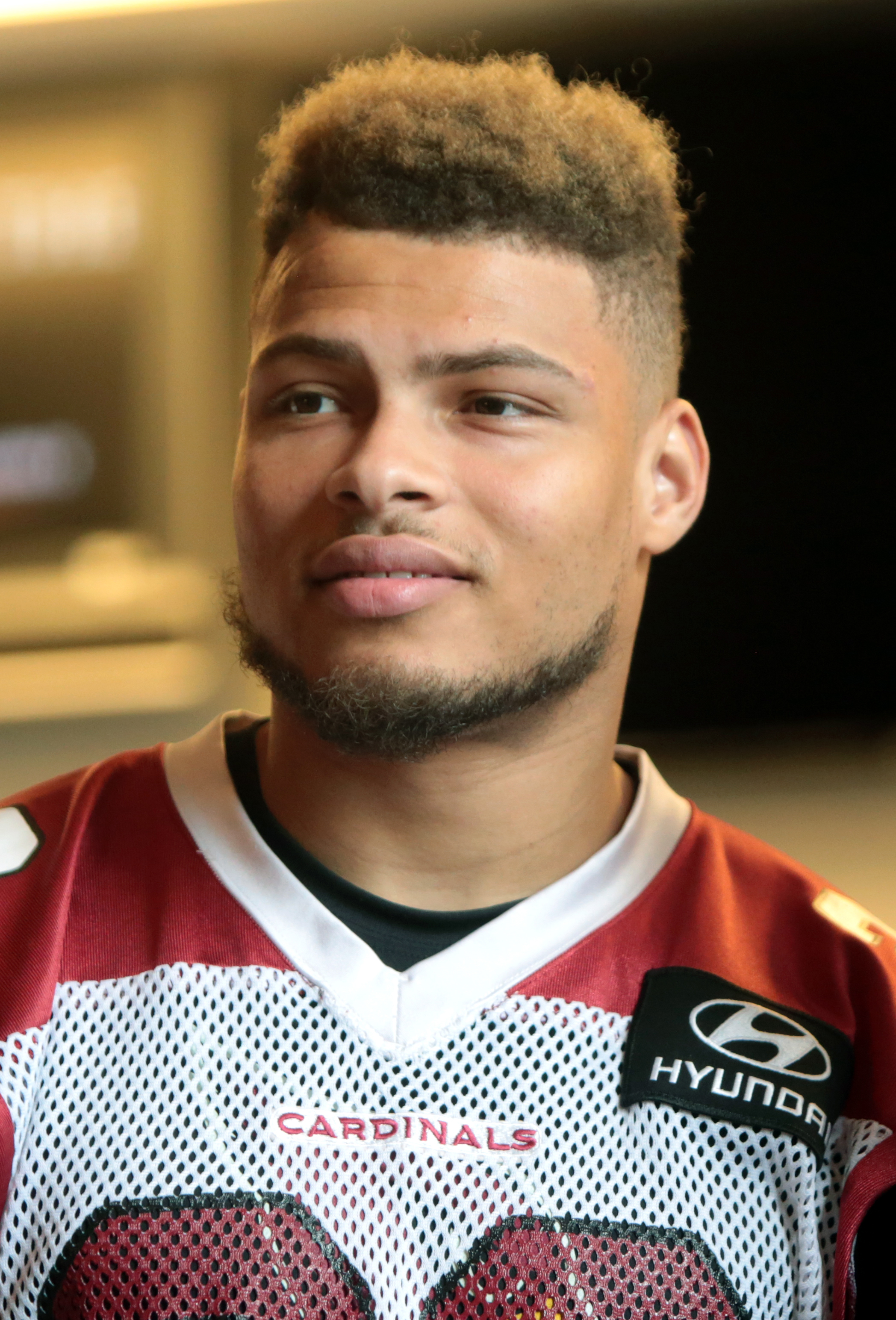
Mathieu in 2016

On September 11, 2016, he started in the Arizona Cardinals home-opener against the New England Patriots and collected a season-high seven solo tackles during a 21–23 loss. On October 17, 2016, Mathieu made six solo tackles, a season-high two pass deflections, and had his only interception on a pass thrown by Geno Smith to wide receiver Charone Peake as the Cardinals routed the New York Jets 28–3. In Week 8, Mathieu made one solo tackle before exiting in the second quarter of a 20–30 loss at the Carolina Panthers with a shoulder injury. He was ruled out for three to six weeks. He was inactive for the next two games (Weeks 10–11). He returned in Week 12, but subsequently missed another two games (Weeks 13–14) after aggravating his shoulder injury. On December 23, 2016, the Arizona Cardinals officially placed him on injured reserve and he was inactive for the last two games (Weeks 16–17) of the season. He finished the 2016 NFL season with a total of 35 combined tackles (33 solo), four pass deflections, one interception, one sack, and a forced fumble in ten games and ten starts.

==== 2017 ====
He entered training camp slated as the de facto starting free safety. He returned as the starting free safety to begin the season, alongside strong safety Antoine Bethea. On September 17, 2017, Mathieu made three solo tackles, two pass deflections, and intercepted a pass thrown by Jacoby Brissett to wide receiver Kamar Aiken in overtime in a 16–13 victory over the Indianapolis Colts. The pick set the Cardinals up to win the game on a Phil Dawson field goal. In Week 4, he collected a season-high 12 solo tackles and made one sack in the Cardinals' 18–15 win against the San Francisco 49ers. On November 26, 2017, he made four solo tackles, a season-high three pass deflections, and intercepted a pass by Blake Bortles to wide receiver Dede Westbrook during a 27–24 win against the Jacksonville Jaguars. He started all 16 games in 2017 and had a total of 78 combined tackles (70 solo), seven pass deflections, two interceptions, a forced fumble, and a sack.

==== 2018 ====
On March 14, 2018, Mathieu was released by the Cardinals after refusing to take a pay cut.

=== Houston Texans ===
On March 17, 2018, the Houston Texans signed Mathieu to a one–year, $7.00 million contract that included $6.50 million guaranteed upon signing and an initial signing bonus of $4.50 million. He entered training camp as the de facto starting free safety, replacing Marcus Gilchrist who departed in free agency. Head coach Bill O'Brien named Mathieu and Kareem Jackson the starting safeties to begin the regular season.

On September 9, 2018, Mathieu started in the Houston Texans' season-opener at the New England Patriots and made five combined tackles (three solo), one pass deflection, recovered a fumble, and intercepted a pass thrown by Tom Brady to running back James White during a 20–27 loss. In Week 7, he recorded five combined tackles (four solo), a pass deflection, had his first sack of the season, and intercepted a pass thrown by Cody Kessler to T. J. Yeldon during a 20–7 win at the Jacksonville Jaguars. In Week 11, he collected a season-high nine combined tackles (eight solo) and made one sack during a 23–21 win at the Washington Redskins. He started in all 16 games and finished with a total of 89 combined tackles (70 solo), eight pass deflections, a career-high three sacks, a fumble recovery, and two interceptions.

=== Kansas City Chiefs ===
==== 2019 ====
On March 14, 2019, the Kansas City Chiefs signed Mathieu to a three–year, $42.00 million contract that includes $26.80 million guaranteed and an initial signing bonus of $14.80 million. He entered training camp projected to earn the role as the starting strong safety, as the successor to Eric Berry. Head coach Andy Reid named Mathieu and Juan Thornhill the starting safeties to begin the season.

In Week 6, he collected a season-high ten solo tackles and broke up a pass during a 24–31 loss against his former team, the Houston Texans. On November 18, 2019, Mathieu made eight combined tackles (four solo), a pass deflection, and intercepted a pass thrown by Philip Rivers during a 24–17 win at the Los Angeles Chargers. The following week, he made one solo tackle, a pass deflection, and intercepted a pass by Derek Carr to tight end Darren Waller as the Chiefs routed the Oakland Raiders 40–9. On December 29, 2019, Mathieu recorded seven solo tackles, two pass deflections, and intercepted a pass by Philip Rivers to wide receiver Mike Williams in a 31–21 victory against the Los Angeles Chargers. He was AFC Defensive Player of the Month for December. He finished with 75 combined tackles (63 solo), four interceptions, 12 passes defended, and two sacks. He earned first team All-Pro honors.

The Kansas City Chiefs finished the 2019 NFL season first in the AFC West with a 12–4 record, clinching a first round bye. The Chiefs defeated the Houston Texans 51–31 in the Divisional Round. On January 19, 2020, Mathieu made nine combined tackles (six solo) and broke up a pass as the Chiefs defeated the Tennessee Titans 35–24 in the AFC Championship Game. On February 2, 2020, Mathieu started in Super Bowl LIV and made six combined tackles (four solo) as the Chiefs defeated the San Francisco 49ers 31–20. He earned his first and only Super Bowl ring of his career. He was ranked 39th by his fellow players on the NFL Top 100 Players of 2020.

==== 2020 ====
He began training camp as the starting strong safety under defensive coordinator Steve Spagnuolo. Head coach Andy Reid named him the starting strong safety to start the season, alongside free safety Daniel Sorensen.

On September 13, 2020, Mathieu started in the Kansas City Chiefs' home-opener against the Houston Texans and collected a season-high eight combined tackles (six solo) during a 34–20 victory. On October 5, 2020, Mathieu recorded four solo tackles, broke up a pass, and returned an interception thrown by Jarrett Stidham to Julian Edelman 25–yards for a touchdown as the Chiefs defeated the New England Patriots 26–10. In Week 11, he made five combined tackles (four solo), deflected a pass, and intercepted a pass attempt by Tom Brady during a 27–24 win at the Tampa Bay Buccaneers. On December 6, 2020, Mathieu made six combined tackles (four solo), a season-high two pass deflections, and tied his career-high of two interceptions on passes thrown by Drew Lock with the second interception occurring late in the fourth quarter, securing a 22–16 win against the Denver Broncos on Sunday Night Football. The following week, he made two solo tackles, tied his season-high to of two pass deflections, and set a career-high with his six interception of the season on a pass by Tua Tagovailoa to wide receiver Jakeem Grant during a 33–27 win at the Miami Dolphins in Week 14. He was inactive as a healthy scratch for the Chiefs' Week 17 loss to the Los Angeles Chargers as head coach Andy Reid opted to rest the starting lineup as they had already clinched a playoff berth. This ended his active streak of 63 consecutive regular season starts. He finished the 2020 season with 62 combined tackles (48 solo), nine passes defended, one fumble recovery, a career-high six interceptions, and a touchdown in 15 games and 15 starts. He earned his first Pro Bowl nomination since the 2015 season. He was named as a first team All-Pro.

The Kansas City Chiefs finished the 2020 NFL season a top the AFC West with a 14–2 record, while also clinching home-field advantage and a first-round bye. On January 17, 2021, Mathieu started in the Divisional Round of the playoffs against the Cleveland Browns and made seven combined tackles (five solo), broke up a pass, and intercepted a pass thrown by Baker Mayfield to Jarvis Landry during the 22–17 win. The following week, he made six solo tackles as the Chiefs defeated the Buffalo Bills 38–24 in the AFC Championship Game. On February 7, 2021, Mathieu started in Super Bowl LV and recorded three combined tackles (two solo) as the Chiefs lost 9–31 to the Tampa Bay Buccaneers. During the game, Mathieu got in a verbal altercation with Buccaneers' quarterback Tom Brady and tweeted that Brady "called me something I won't repeat" after the game. Mathieu later removed the tweet. Brady was mic'd up during said altercation, but the NFL refused to release the audio. He was ranked 58th by his fellow players on the NFL Top 100 Players of 2021.

==== 2021 ====
He returned as the starting strong safety to begin the regular season and was paired with free safety Daniel Sorensen.

On September 1, 2021, Mathieu tested positive for COVID-19 and was placed on the COVID-19/reserve list. On September 11, 2021, he returned to the active roster and was activated off the COVID-19/reserve list. However, as a precaution he remained inactive during the Chiefs' home-opener against the Cleveland Browns as they won 33–29. On September 19, 2021, he made six combined tackles (five solo), a season-high three pass deflections, a season-high two interceptions, and scored a touchdown after returning an interception thrown by Lamar Jackson to Sammy Watkins 34–yards on the opening drive as the Chiefs lost 36–35 at the Baltimore Ravens. In Week 13, he collected a season-high nine combined tackles (seven solo) during a 22–9 win against the Denver Broncos. The following week, he made five solo tackles, a pass deflection, and intercepted a pass by Derek Carr as the Chiefs routed the Las Vegas Raiders 48–9. He finished the season with 76 combined tackles (60 solo), three interceptions, six passes defended, three fumble recoveries, and one touchdown in 16 games and 16 starts.. He was named to his third career Pro Bowl.

The Kansas City Chiefs finished first in the AFC West for a third consecutive season and clinched a playoff berth with a 14–3 record. They defeated the Pittsburgh Steelers 42–21 in the AFC Wildcard Game and defeated the Buffalo Bills 42–36 in the Divisional Round. For the third consecutive season, the Chiefs appeared in the AFC Championship Game. On January 30, 2022, Mathieu started in the AFC Championship Game and made five solo tackles as the Chiefs lost 24–27 in overtime to the Cincinnati Bengals. He was ranked 70th by his fellow players on the NFL Top 100 Players of 2022.

=== New Orleans Saints ===
On May 4, 2022, the New Orleans Saints signed Mathieu to a three–year, $28.30 million contract that included $18.00 million guaranteed and an initial signing bonus of $9.50 million. With incentives he could have earned up to $33.00 million. He entered training camp slated as the de facto starting strong safety following the departures of C. J. Gardner-Johnson, Malcolm Jenkins, and Marcus Williams. Head coach Dennis Allen listed him as a starter to begin the season and paired him with starting free safety Marcus Maye.

On October 30, 2022, he made five combined tackles (four solo), a season–high two pass deflections, and intercepted a pass thrown by Derek Carr to Hunter Renfrow during a 24–0 win against the Las Vegas Raiders. In Week 16, he collected a season-high 11 combined tackles (six solo) during a 17–10 victory against the Cleveland Browns. On January 8, 2023, Mathieu made eight combined tackles (four solo), a pass deflection, and intercepted a pass thrown by Sam Darnold to wide receiver D. J. Moore during a 7–10 loss to the Carolina Panthers. He started all 17 games and made a career-high 91 combined tackles (64 solo), three interceptions, eight passes defended, one sack, and one forced fumble.

==== 2023 ====
Head coach Dennis Allen named Mathieu and Marcus Maye as the starting safeties to begin the regular season. On October 8, 2023, he made one solo tackle, a pass deflection, and returned an interception thrown by Mac Jones to running back Rhamondre Stevenson 27–yards for a touchdown during a 34–0 victory at the New England Patriots. On November 26, 2023, Mathieu made four combined tackles (three solo), a season-high two pass deflections, and tied his career-high of two interceptions on passes by Desmond Ridder during a 15–24 loss at the Atlanta Falcons. In Week 16, he collected a season-high nine combined tackles (six solo) and broke up a pass during a 22–30 loss at the Los Angeles Rams. He finished the season with 75 combined tackles (50 solo), four interceptions, nine passes defended, and one touchdown while starting in all 17 games.

==== 2024 ====
On March 7, 2024, the New Orleans Saints signed Mathieu to a two–year, $13.75 million contract extension that included $9.00 million guaranteed upon signing and an initial signing bonus of $5.00 million. Mathieu returned as the starting free safety and was paired with strong safety Will Harris.

On September 22, 2024, Mathieu collected a season-high seven solo tackles, made one pass deflection, and intercepted a pass thrown by Jalen Hurts to wide receiver DeVonta Smith during a 12–15 loss to the Philadelphia Eagles. On November 4, 2024, the New Orleans Saints announced the firing of head coach Dennis Allen after falling to a 2–7 record. Special teams coordinator Darren Rizzi was appointed the interim head coach for the remainder of the season. On November 10, 2024, he recorded three solo tackles, a season-high three pass deflections, and intercepted a pass by Kirk Cousins to receiver Drake London as the Saints defeated the Atlanta Falcons 17–20. He started all 17 games during the 2024 NFL season and finished with 62 combined tackles (47 solo), seven pass deflections, three interceptions, two forced fumbles, and one fumble recovery.

On July 22, 2025, the Saints announced that Mathieu informed the team that he would be retiring. Mathieu announced his decision to retire on his personal Instagram account the same day.

== Career statistics ==
=== NFL ===
Legend
	Won the Super Bowl
**Bold**	Career high

Year	Team	Games		Tackles				Interceptions				Fumbles			
Year	Team	GP	GS	Cmb	Solo	Ast	Sck	PD	Int	Yds	TD	FF	FR	Yds	TD
2013	ARI	13	11	68	65	3	1.0	9	2	7	0	1	0	0	0
2014	ARI	13	6	38	35	3	0.0	4	1	9	0	0	1	9	0
2015	ARI	14	14	89	**80**	9	1.0	**17**	5	**92**	**1**	1	0	0	0
2016	ARI	10	10	35	33	2	1.0	4	1	9	0	1	0	0	0
2017	ARI	16	16	78	70	8	1.0	7	2	16	0	1	0	0	0
2018	HOU	16	16	89	70	19	**3.0**	8	2	6	0	0	1	10	0
2019	KC	16	16	75	63	12	2.0	12	4	70	0	0	0	0	0
2020	KC	15	15	62	48	14	0.0	9	**6**	70	**1**	0	1	−2	0
2021	KC	16	16	76	60	16	1.0	6	3	56	**1**	0	**3**	**12**	0
2022	NO	**17**	**17**	**91**	64	**27**	1.0	8	3	44	0	1	1	0	0
2023	NO	**17**	**17**	75	50	25	0.0	9	4	**122**	**1**	0	0	0	0
2024	NO	**17**	**17**	62	47	15	0.0	7	3	29	0	**2**	1	0	0
Career		180	171	838	685	153	11.0	100	36	530	4	7	8	29	0

=== College ===
Season	Team	GP	Tackles							Interceptions				Fumbles		Receptions		
Season	Team	GP	Solo	Ast	Cmb	TfL	Yds	Sck	Yds	Int	Yds	BU	PD	QBH	FF	Rec	Yds	TD
2010	LSU	13	36	23	59	8.5	45	4.5	38	2	0	7	0	1	5	2	13	0
2011	LSU	13	60	17	77	7.5	45	1.5	10	2	16	9	17	3	6	4	39	2
Career		26	96	40	136	16.0	90	6.0	48	4	16	16	17	4	11	6	52	2

== Personal life ==
Mathieu began going by the monicker "the Honeybadger" in September 2011 after a game against West Virginia. It originated when LSU Tigers' defensive coordinator John Chavis saw fans calling Mathieu "the Honeybadger" on sites and on the bus after playing West Virginia. Chavis implored him to go by the nickname. Although Mathieu was hesitant at first, he took Chavis' advice and began using the nickname and stated he's happy he listened and had profited off the monicker.

"We had played West Virginia one night on ESPN, and I got on the bus after the game and our D Coordinator, John Chavis at the time, he was on the Internet. Coaches always tell you not to get on the Internet - They read everything on the Internet. He's like on the blogs, all the gossip sites reading," and he's like "'Hey man, this is your new nickname!' And I'm like 'What?', and he's showing me the video, and I'm like 'Coach...' and he's like 'Trust me, just go with it. You'll make a lot of money one day.'."

— Tyrann Mathieu (On the origin of "the Honeybadger")

On May 10, 2013, Mathieu stated during an interview while watching former teammates practice at the Senior Bowl that he wanted to remove himself from any association with his "Honey Badger" nickname, saying that he wants to be known as "Tyrann Mathieu". This was an attempt to rebuild his reputation following a dismissal from LSU for failing multiple drug tests and an arrest for marijuana possession. Although he attempted to disassociate himself with his "Honey Badger" moniker, he would still be known by it throughout his career and finally publicly accepted his alter-ego in 2019.

In 2019, Kansas City Chiefs' head coach Andy Reid called Mathieu "T-5". He began going by "T-5" as his new nickname during training camp immediately after joining the Chiefs. Prior to his regular season debut with the Chiefs in September 2019, Mathieu was renamed by fans and teammates as "The Landlord", because he's the guy who collected the rent.

Mathieu is Catholic.
