= 2024 New Orleans Saints season =

58th season in franchise history

- Owner: Gayle Benson
- General manager: Mickey Loomis
- Head coach: Dennis Allen (fired November 4, 2–7 record); Darren Rizzi (interim, 3–5 record)
- Offensive coordinator: Klint Kubiak
- Defensive coordinator: Joe Woods
- Home stadium: Caesars Superdome

Results
- Record: 5–12
- Division place: 4th NFC South
- Playoffs: Did not qualify
- All-Pros: ST J. T. Gray (2nd team)
- Pro Bowlers: C Erik McCoy

Uniform
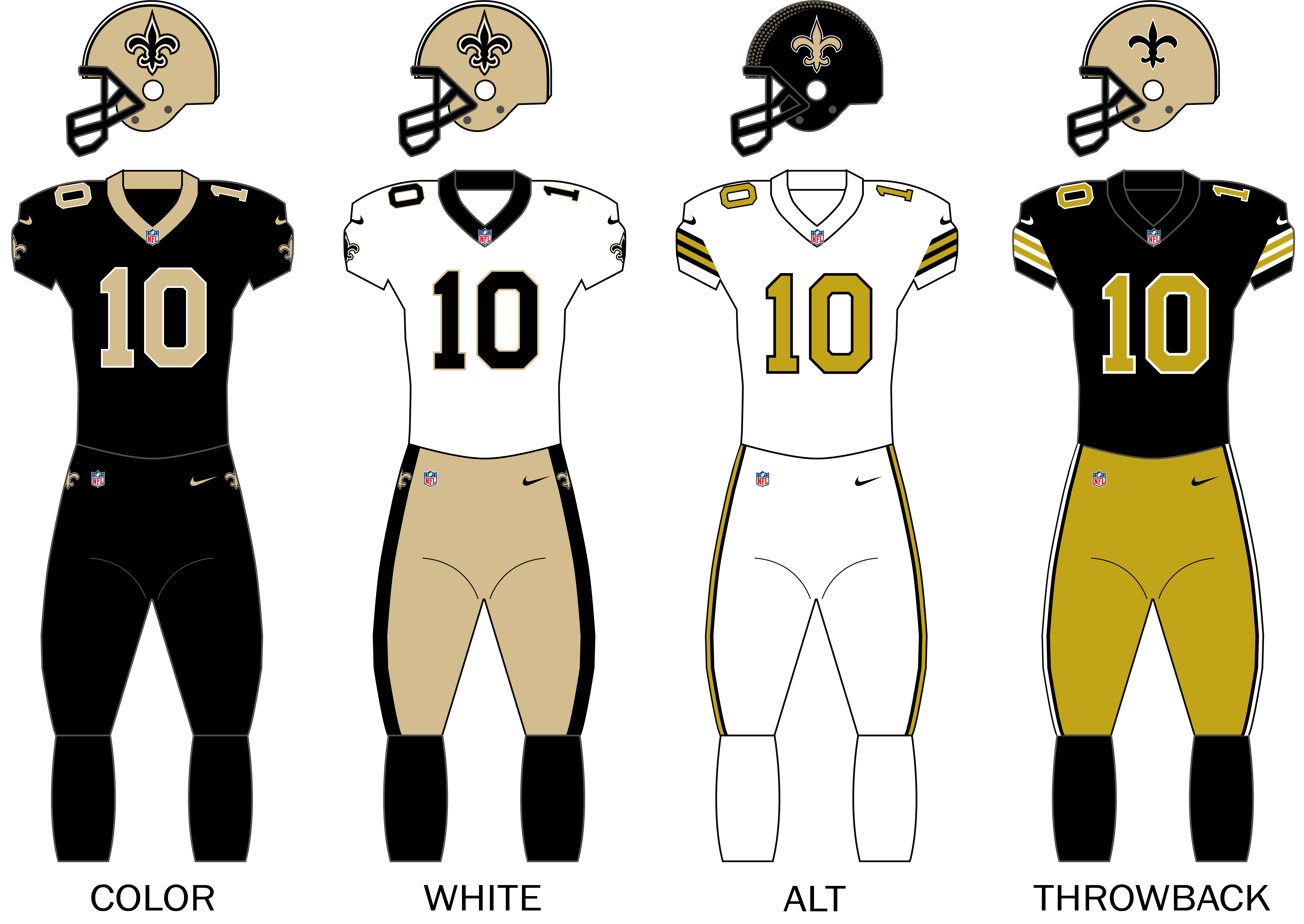

The 2024 season was the New Orleans Saints' 58th in the National Football League (NFL), the 49th to host games at the Caesars Superdome and the third and final under head coach Dennis Allen. Despite starting the season 2–0 with over 40 points scored in both games, the Saints lost 12 of their last 15 games, which included a seven-game losing streak for the first time since 1999. The Saints failed to improve on their 9–8 record from the previous season following a loss to the former division rival Los Angeles Rams in Week 13 and missed the playoffs for the fourth straight year when the Atlanta Falcons defeated the New York Giants in Week 16, coupled with their own 34–0 shutout loss to the Green Bay Packers later that night. On November 4, following a Week 9 loss to the Carolina Panthers, the Saints fired Allen and promoted assistant head coach and special teams coordinator Darren Rizzi to be the interim head coach. The Saints finished last in the NFC South for the first time since 2008 after a loss to the Buccaneers coupled with the Panthers beating the Falcons in overtime during the final week of the regular season. Their .294 winning percentage was their worst since 2005.

== Draft ==
2024 New Orleans Saints draft selections
Round	Selection	Player	Position	College	Notes
1	14	Taliese Fuaga	OT	Oregon State	
2	41	Kool-Aid McKinstry	CB	Alabama	From Jets via Packers (Note: The Saints traded second-, fifth- and sixth-round selections (45th, 168th and 190th overall) to the Green Bay Packers in exchange for a second-round selection (41st overall).)
2	45	Traded to the Green Bay Packers			From Broncos (Note: The Saints traded a third-round selection (81st overall) and the coaching rights to Sean Payton to the Denver Broncos in exchange for a second-round selection (45th overall) and a 2023 first-round selection.)
2	50	Traded to the Philadelphia Eagles (Note: The Saints traded a second-round selection (50th overall), a 2023 first-round selection and 2022 first-, third- and seventh-round selections to the Philadelphia Eagles in exchange for two 2022 first-round selections and a 2023 sixth-round selection.)			
3	81	Traded to the Denver Broncos			
4	116	Traded to the Jacksonville Jaguars (Note: The Saints traded a fourth-round selection (116th overall) and a 2023 seventh-round selection (227th overall) to the Jacksonville Jaguars in exchange for a 2023 fourth-round selection (127th overall).)			
5	150	Spencer Rattler	QB	South Carolina	
5	168	Traded to the Green Bay Packers			
5	170	Bub Means	WR	Pittsburgh	Compensatory selection
5	175	Jaylan Ford	LB	Texas	Compensatory selection
6	190	Traded to the Green Bay Packers			
6	199	Khristian Boyd	DT	Northern Iowa	From Eagles (Note: The Saints traded a 2025 seventh-round selection and CB C. J. Gardner-Johnson to the Philadelphia Eagles in exchange for a sixth-round selection (199th overall) and a 2023 fifth-round selection.)
7	238	Traded to the Houston Texans (Note: The Saints traded a seventh-round selection (238th overall) to the Houston Texans in exchange for RB Mark Ingram II.)			
7	239	Josiah Ezirim	OT	Eastern Kentucky	From Rams via Broncos (Note: The Saints traded K Wil Lutz to the Denver Broncos in exchange for a seventh-round selection (239th overall).)

2024 New Orleans Saints undrafted free agents
Name	Position	College	Ref.
Kyler Baugh	DT	Minnesota	
Millard Bradford	S	TCU	
Matthew Hayball	P	Vanderbilt	
Sincere Haynesworth	C	Tulane	
Kyle Hergel	G	Boston College	
Dallin Holker	TE	Colorado State	
Jermaine Jackson	WR	Idaho	
Trajan Jeffcoat	DE	Arkansas	
Lawrence Johnson	S	Southeast Missouri State	
Jacob Kibodi	RB	Louisiana	
Nate Latu	DE	Oklahoma State	
Nouri Nouili	G	Nebraska	
Rico Payton	CB	Pittsburg State	
Kyle Sheets	WR	Slippery Rock	
Isaiah Stalbird	LB	South Dakota State	
Mason Tipton	WR	Yale	

Draft trades

== Staff ==
2024 New Orleans Saints staff
Front office: Owner – Gayle Benson; President – Dennis Lauscha; Executive vice president/general manager – Mickey Loomis; VP/assistant general manager – college personnel – Jeff Ireland; Asst. general manager & vice president of football operations – Khai Harley; Director of operations – Derek Stamnos; Director of pro personnel – Michael Parenton; Director of football administration – Scott Kuhn; Director of analytics – Zach Stuart; Senior personnel advisor – Randy Mueller; Personnel advisor – Dave Ziegler; Head coaches: Head coach – Dennis Allen (fired on November 4); Interim head coach/special teams coordinator – Darren Rizzi; Offensive coaches: Offensive coordinator – Klint Kubiak; Quarterbacks – Andrew Janocko; Running backs – Derrick Foster; Wide receivers – Keith Williams; Assistant wide receivers – DeNarius McGhee; Tight ends – Clancy Barone; Offensive line – John Benton; Senior offensive assistant – Rick Dennison; Offensive assistant – Jahri Evans; Offensive assistant – Kevin Petry; Offensive assistant – Jordan Traylor	Defensive coaches: Defensive coordinator – Joe Woods; Defensive line – Todd Grantham; Linebackers – Michael Hodges; Secondary – Marcus Robertson; Senior defensive assistant – Peter Giunta; Defensive assistant – Adam Gristick; Defensive assistant – Matt Giordano; Pass rush specialist – Brian Young; Special teams coaches: Assistant special teams – Phil Galiano; Assistant to the head coach – Mike Martinez; Strength and conditioning: Director of sports science – Matt Rhea; Strength and conditioning coach – Matt Clapp; Assistant strength and conditioning – Charles Byrd; Assistant strength and conditioning – Rob Wenning

== Final roster ==
2024 New Orleans Saints roster
Quarterbacks (QB): 4 Derek Carr; 3 Jake Haener; 18 Spencer Rattler; Running backs (RB): 41 Alvin Kamara; 25 Kendre Miller; 33 Jordan Mims; 46 Adam Prentice FB; 21 Jamaal Williams; Wide receivers (WR): 81 Kevin Austin Jr.; 17 Dante Pettis; 84 Mason Tipton; 10 Marquez Valdes-Scantling; 11 Cedrick Wilson Jr.; Tight ends (TE): 85 Dallin Holker; 83 Juwan Johnson; 87 Foster Moreau	Offensive linemen (OL): 79 Josh Ball T; 75 Taliese Fuaga LT; 60 Kyle Hergel G; 66 Shane Lemieux G; 70 Trevor Penning RT; 51 Cesar Ruiz RG; 74 Oli Udoh LT; 67 Landon Young LG; Defensive linemen (DL): 97 Khristian Boyd DT; 90 Bryan Bresee DT; 55 Isaiah Foskey DE; 96 Carl Granderson DE; 94 Cameron Jordan DE; 92 Tanoh Kpassagnon DE; 95 John Ridgeway III DT; 50 Khalen Saunders DT; 93 Nathan Shepherd DT; 98 Payton Turner DE; 99 Chase Young DE	Linebackers (LB): 56 Demario Davis MLB; 6 Willie Gay OLB; 58 Anfernee Orji OLB; 45 Nephi Sewell OLB; 44 Isaiah Stalbird OLB; 20 Pete Werner OLB; Defensive backs (DB): 0 Ugo Amadi FS; 48 J. T. Gray FS; 5 Will Harris SS; 31 Jordan Howden SS; 27 Shemar Jean-Charles CB; 32 Tyrann Mathieu FS; 14 Kool-Aid McKinstry CB; 36 Rico Payton CB; 1 Alontae Taylor CB; Special teams (ST): 19 Blake Grupe K; 43 Matthew Hayball P; 49 Zach Wood LS	Practice squad: 57 Ryder Anderson DT; 38 Millard Bradford SS; 15 Ben DiNucci QB; 23 Clyde Edwards-Helaire RB; 72 Josiah Ezirim RT; 26 Tra Fluellen CB; 63 Sincere Haynesworth C; 28 Tre Herndon CB; 80 Jermaine Jackson WR; 86 Michael Jacobson TE; 59 Trajan Jeffcoat OLB (PS/I); 39 Charlie Smyth K (Int.); 13 Equanimeous St. Brown WR; 34 Xazavian Valladay RB; 82 Treyton Welch TE; Reserve: 29 Paulson Adebo CB (IR); 53 Jaylan Ford OLB (IR); 77 Justin Herron LT (IR); 7 Taysom Hill TE (IR); 52 D'Marco Jackson MLB (IR); 78 Erik McCoy C (IR); 16 Bub Means WR (IR); 12 Chris Olave WR (IR); 62 Lucas Patrick C (IR); -- Camron Peterson DT (IR); 71 Ryan Ramczyk RT (PUP); 64 Nick Saldiveri LG (IR); 22 Rashid Shaheed WR (IR); 28 Rejzohn Wright CB (IR); Rookies in italics 53 active, 14 reserve, 13 practice squad (2 exempt)

== Preseason ==
Week	Date	Opponent	Result	Record	Venue	Recap
1	August 10	at Arizona Cardinals	W 16–14	1–0	State Farm Stadium	Recap
2	August 18	at San Francisco 49ers	L 10–16	1–1	Levi's Stadium	Recap
3	August 25	Tennessee Titans	L 27–30	1–2	Caesars Superdome	Recap

== Regular season ==
=== Schedule ===
Week	Date	Opponent	Result	Record	Venue	Recap
1	September 8	**Carolina Panthers**	**W** 47–10	1–0	Caesars Superdome	Recap
2	September 15	at Dallas Cowboys	**W** 44–19	2–0	AT&T Stadium	Recap
3	September 22	Philadelphia Eagles	**L** 12–15	2–1	Caesars Superdome	Recap
4	September 29	at **Atlanta Falcons**	**L** 24–26	2–2	Mercedes-Benz Stadium	Recap
5	October 7	at Kansas City Chiefs	**L** 13–26	2–3	Arrowhead Stadium	Recap
6	October 13	**Tampa Bay Buccaneers**	**L** 27–51	2–4	Caesars Superdome	Recap
7	October 17	Denver Broncos	**L** 10–33	2–5	Caesars Superdome	Recap
8	October 27	at Los Angeles Chargers	**L** 8–26	2–6	SoFi Stadium	Recap
9	November 3	at **Carolina Panthers**	**L** 22–23	2–7	Bank of America Stadium	Recap
10	November 10	**Atlanta Falcons**	**W** 20–17	3–7	Caesars Superdome	Recap
11	November 17	Cleveland Browns	**W** 35–14	4–7	Caesars Superdome	Recap
12	Bye					
13	December 1	Los Angeles Rams	**L** 14–21	4–8	Caesars Superdome	Recap
14	December 8	at New York Giants	**W** 14–11	5–8	MetLife Stadium	Recap
15	December 15	Washington Commanders	**L** 19–20	5–9	Caesars Superdome	Recap
16	December 23	at Green Bay Packers	**L** 0–34	5–10	Lambeau Field	Recap
17	December 29	Las Vegas Raiders	**L** 10–25	5–11	Caesars Superdome	Recap
18	January 5	at **Tampa Bay Buccaneers**	**L** 19–27	5–12	Raymond James Stadium	Recap

Note: Intra-division opponents are in bold text.

=== Game summaries ===
==== Week 1: vs. Carolina Panthers ====
Week 1: Carolina Panthers at New Orleans Saints – Game summary

Quarter	1	2	3	4	Total
Panthers	0	3	7	0	**10**
**Saints**	17	13	7	10	**47**

at Caesars Superdome, New Orleans, Louisiana

- Date: September 8
- Game time: 12:00 p.m. CDT
- Game weather: None (indoor stadium)
- Game attendance: 70,007
- Referee: Alan Eck
- TV announcers (Fox): Chris Myers, Mark Schlereth and Jen Hale
- Recap, Game Book

Game information

**First quarter**

- NO – Rashid Shaheed 59-yard pass from Derek Carr (Blake Grupe kick), 12:08. Saints 7–0. **Drive: 5 plays, 76 yards, 2:52.**
- NO – Blake Grupe 57-yard field goal, 10:04. Saints 10–0. **Drive: 4 plays, 1 yard, 1:50.**
- NO – Foster Moreau 3-yard pass from Derek Carr (Blake Grupe kick), 1:23. Saints 17–0. **Drive: 11 plays, 79 yards, 5:38.**

**Second quarter**

- NO – Blake Grupe 44-yard field goal, 7:03. Saints 20–0. **Drive: 9 plays, 48 yards, 5:07.**
- NO – Blake Grupe 52-yard field goal, 2:08. Saints 23–0. **Drive: 7 plays, 9 yards, 3:57.**
- NO – Juwan Johnson 16-yard pass from Derek Carr (Blake Grupe kick), 1:18. Saints 30–0. **Drive: 1 play, 16 yards, 0:06.**
- CAR – Eddy Piñeiro 43-yard field goal, 0:00. Saints 30–3. **Drive: 8 plays, 45 yards, 1:18.**

**Third quarter**

- NO – Alvin Kamara 1-yard run (Blake Grupe kick), 8:27. Saints 37–3. **Drive: 9 plays, 57 yards, 5:26.**
- CAR – Bryce Young 3-yard run (Eddy Piñeiro kick), 4:55. Saints 37–10. **Drive: 8 plays, 75 yards, 3:32.**

**Fourth quarter**

- NO – Blake Grupe 39-yard field goal, 13:08. Saints 40–10. **Drive: 12 plays, 43 yards, 6:47.**
- NO – Jamaal Williams 14-yard run (Blake Grupe kick), 10:38. Saints 47–10. **Drive: 2 plays, 36 yards, 0:43.**

**Top passers**

- CAR – Bryce Young – 13/30, 161 yards, 2 INT
- NO – Derek Carr – 19/23, 200 yards, 3 TD

**Top rushers**

- CAR – Miles Sanders – 5 rushes, 22 yards
- NO – Alvin Kamara – 15 rushes, 83 yards, TD

**Top receivers**

- CAR – Adam Thielen – 3 receptions, 49 yards
- NO – Rashid Shaheed – 3 receptions, 73 yards, TD

With a dominant win over the visiting Carolina Panthers, the Saints begin their season 1–0 for the sixth straight time. This is also the first time since the 2005 season where they start off with a win over the Panthers and the first since the 2009 season where they won their home opener with over 40 points on the board.

==== Week 2: at Dallas Cowboys ====
Week 2: New Orleans Saints at Dallas Cowboys – Game summary

Quarter	1	2	3	4	Total
**Saints**	14	21	6	3	**44**
Cowboys	3	13	3	0	**19**

at AT&T Stadium, Arlington, Texas

- Date: September 15
- Game time: 12:00 p.m. CDT
- Game weather: None (retractable roof closed)
- Game attendance: 93,691
- Referee: Shawn Smith
- TV announcers (Fox): Kevin Burkhardt, Tom Brady, Erin Andrews and Tom Rinaldi
- Recap, Game Book

Game information

**First quarter**

- NO – Alvin Kamara 5-yard run (Blake Grupe kick), 10:50. Saints 7–0. **Drive: 7 plays, 80 yards, 4:10.**
- DAL – Brandon Aubrey 52-yard field goal, 4:14. Saints 7–3. **Drive: 13 plays, 45 yards, 6:36.**
- NO – Rashid Shaheed 70-yard pass from Derek Carr (Blake Grupe kick), 4:05. Saints 14–3. **Drive: 1 play, 70 yards, 0:09.**

**Second quarter**

- DAL – Brandon Aubrey 38-yard field goal, 11:39. Saints 14–6. **Drive: 14 plays, 41 yards, 7:26.**
- NO – Alvin Kamara 57-yard pass from Derek Carr (Blake Grupe kick), 9:30. Saints 21–6. **Drive: 4 plays, 70 yards, 2:09.**
- DAL – CeeDee Lamb 65-yard pass from Dak Prescott (Brandon Aubrey kick), 7:43. Saints 21–13. **Drive: 4 plays, 78 yards, 1:47.**
- NO – Alvin Kamara 12-yard run (Blake Grupe kick), 2:48. Saints 28–13. **Drive: 11 plays, 70 yards, 4:55.**
- NO – Derek Carr 1-yard run (Blake Grupe kick), 0:39. Saints 35–13. **Drive: 3 plays, 20 yards, 0:23.**
- DAL – Brandon Aubrey 48-yard field goal, 0:00. Saints 35–16. **Drive: 7 plays, 40 yards, 0:39.**

**Third quarter**

- DAL – Brandon Aubrey 40-yard field goal, 9:05. Saints 35–19. **Drive: 10 plays, 51 yards, 5:55.**
- NO – Alvin Kamara 7-yard run (kick blocked), 1:09. Saints 41–19. **Drive: 13 plays, 70 yards, 7:56.**

**Fourth quarter**

- NO – Blake Grupe 26-yard field goal, 5:11. Saints 44–19. **Drive: 4 plays, 5 yards, 2:38.**

**Top passers**

- NO – Derek Carr – 11/16, 243 yards, 2 TD, INT
- DAL – Dak Prescott – 27/39, 293 yards, TD, 2 INT

**Top rushers**

- NO – Alvin Kamara – 20 rushes, 115 yards, 3 TD
- DAL – Rico Dowdle – 7 rushes, 30 yards

**Top receivers**

- NO – Rashid Shaheed – 4 receptions, 96 yards, TD
- DAL – CeeDee Lamb – 4 receptions, 90 yards, TD

The Saints continued their dominance with the win against the Cowboys, improving them to 2–0 in the process.

==== Week 3: vs. Philadelphia Eagles ====
Week 3: Philadelphia Eagles at New Orleans Saints – Game summary

Quarter	1	2	3	4	Total
**Eagles**	0	0	0	15	**15**
Saints	3	0	0	9	**12**

at Caesars Superdome, New Orleans, Louisiana

- Date: September 22
- Game time: 12:00 p.m. CDT
- Game weather: None (indoor stadium)
- Game attendance: 70,006
- Referee: Scott Novak
- TV announcers (Fox): Joe Davis, Greg Olsen and Pam Oliver
- Recap, Game Book

Game information

**First quarter**

- NO – Blake Grupe 34-yard field goal, 6:51. Saints 3–0. **Drive: 15 plays, 54 yards, 8:09.**

**Second quarter**

- No scoring plays.

**Third quarter**

- No scoring plays.

**Fourth quarter**

- PHI – Saquon Barkley 65-yard run (Jake Elliott kick), 13:17. Eagles 7–3. **Drive: 4 plays, 82 yards, 1:41.**
- NO – Blake Grupe 38-yard field goal, 9:49. Eagles 7–6. **Drive: 8 plays, 50 yards, 3:28.**
- NO – Chris Olave 13-yard pass from Derek Carr (pass failed), 2:03. Saints 12–7. **Drive: 9 plays, 50 yards, 4:38.**
- PHI – Saquon Barkley 4-yard run (Saquon Barkley run), 1:01. Eagles 15–12. **Drive: 5 plays, 69 yards, 1:02.**

**Top passers**

- PHI – Jalen Hurts – 29/38, 311 yards, INT
- NO – Derek Carr – 14/25, 142 yards, TD, INT

**Top rushers**

- PHI – Saquon Barkley – 17 rushes, 147 yards, 2 TD
- NO – Alvin Kamara – 26 rushes, 87 yards

**Top receivers**

- PHI – Dallas Goedert – 10 receptions, 170 yards
- NO – Chris Olave – 6 receptions, 86 yards, TD

The Saints were unable to hold off the visiting Eagles, resulting in a 15–12 loss, bringing their record to 2–1 for the second straight season.

==== Week 4: at Atlanta Falcons ====
Week 4: New Orleans Saints at Atlanta Falcons – Game summary

Quarter	1	2	3	4	Total
Saints	7	7	3	7	**24**
**Falcons**	7	10	3	6	**26**

at Mercedes-Benz Stadium, Atlanta, Georgia

- Date: September 29
- Game time: 1:00 p.m. EDT/12:00 p.m. CDT
- Game weather: None (retractable roof closed)
- Game attendance: 72,204
- Referee: John Hussey
- TV announcers (Fox): Kenny Albert, Jonathan Vilma and Megan Olivi
- Recap, Game Book

Game information

**First quarter**

- ATL – KhaDarel Hodge fumble recovery in the end zone (Younghoe Koo kick), 11:13. Falcons 7–0. **Drive: 8 plays, 24 yards, 3:47.**
- NO – Taysom Hill 2-yard run (Blake Grupe kick), 6:39. Tied 7–7. **Drive: 9 plays, 70 yards, 4:34.**

**Second quarter**

- NO – Taysom Hill 5-yard run (Blake Grupe kick), 13:42. Saints 14–7. **Drive: 11 plays, 53 yards, 6:01.**
- ATL – Younghoe Koo 53-yard field goal, 9:57. Saints 14–10. **Drive: 7 plays, 42 yards, 3:45.**
- ATL – Troy Andersen 47-yard interception return (Younghoe Koo kick), 7:54. Falcons 17–14.

**Third quarter**

- ATL – Younghoe Koo 44-yard field goal, 6:46. Falcons 20–14. **Drive: 10 plays, 64 yards, 3:59.**
- NO – Blake Grupe 43-yard field goal, 1:03. Falcons 20–17. **Drive: 10 plays, 50 yards, 5:43.**

**Fourth quarter**

- ATL – Younghoe Koo 42-yard field goal, 10:09. Falcons 23–17. **Drive: 10 plays, 57 yards, 5:54.**
- NO – Alvin Kamara 1-yard run (Blake Grupe kick), 1:00. Saints 24–23. **Drive: 9 plays, 42 yards, 2:28.**
- ATL – Younghoe Koo 58-yard field goal, 0:02. Falcons 26–24. **Drive: 5 plays, 30 yards, 0:58.**

**Top passers**

- NO – Derek Carr – 28/36, 239 yards, INT
- ATL – Kirk Cousins – 21/35, 238 yards, INT

**Top rushers**

- NO – Alvin Kamara – 19 rushes, 77 yards, TD
- ATL – Tyler Allgeier – 8 rushes, 60 yards

**Top receivers**

- NO – Chris Olave – 8 receptions, 87 yards
- ATL – Drake London – 6 receptions, 64 yards

The Saints were close to beating the Falcons, but Younghoe Koo struck a successful field goal to seal the Saints another loss, falling to 2–2.

==== Week 5: at Kansas City Chiefs ====
Week 5: New Orleans Saints at Kansas City Chiefs – Game summary

Quarter	1	2	3	4	Total
Saints	0	7	0	6	**13**
**Chiefs**	7	9	0	10	**26**

at Arrowhead Stadium, Kansas City, Missouri

- Date: October 7
- Game time: 7:15 p.m. CDT
- Game weather: 70 °F (21 °C)
- Game attendance: 73,592
- Referee: Brad Rogers
- TV announcers (WDSU/ESPN): Joe Buck, Troy Aikman and Lisa Salters
- Recap, Game Book

Game information

**First quarter**

- KC – Kareem Hunt 5-yard run (Harrison Butker kick), 6:34. Chiefs 7–0. **Drive: 10 plays, 78 yards, 5:25.**

**Second quarter**

- KC – Harrison Butker 26-yard field goal, 12:39. Chiefs 10–0. **Drive: 10 plays, 52 yards, 4:47.**
- NO – Rashid Shaheed 43-yard pass from Derek Carr (Blake Grupe kick), 8:36. Chiefs 10–7. **Drive: 7 plays, 74 yards, 4:03.**
- KC – Harrison Butker 34-yard field goal, 1:32. Chiefs 13–7. **Drive: 15 plays, 64 yards, 7:04.**
- KC – Harrison Butker 28-yard field goal, 0:06. Chiefs 16–7. **Drive: 9 plays, 55 yards, 0:52.**

**Third quarter**

- No scoring plays.

**Fourth quarter**

- NO – Foster Moreau 6-yard pass from Derek Carr (kick failed, wide left), 14:16. Chiefs 16–13. **Drive: 8 plays, 65 yards, 2:27.**
- KC – Xavier Worthy 3-yard run (Harrison Butker kick), 11:56. Chiefs 23–13. **Drive: 5 plays, 68 yards, 2:20.**
- KC – Harrison Butker 38-yard field goal, 3:03. Chiefs 26–13. **Drive: 11 plays, 38 yards, 6:29.**

**Top passers**

- NO – Derek Carr – 18/28, 165 yards, 2 TD, INT
- KC – Patrick Mahomes – 28/39, 331 yards, INT

**Top rushers**

- NO – Alvin Kamara – 11 rushes, 26 yards
- KC – Kareem Hunt – 27 rushes, 102 yards, TD

**Top receivers**

- NO – Rashid Shaheed – 4 receptions, 86 yards, TD
- KC – JuJu Smith-Schuster – 7 receptions, 130 yards

During a 26–13 loss, Derek Carr suffered an oblique injury, which resulted in him missing the next three games. This loss resulted in the Saints falling to 2–3.

==== Week 6: vs. Tampa Bay Buccaneers ====
Week 6: Tampa Bay Buccaneers at New Orleans Saints – Game summary

Quarter	1	2	3	4	Total
**Buccaneers**	17	7	7	20	**51**
Saints	0	27	0	0	**27**

at Caesars Superdome, New Orleans, Louisiana

- Date: October 13
- Game time: 12:00 p.m. CDT
- Game weather: None (indoor stadium)
- Game attendance: 70,041
- Referee: Clete Blakeman
- TV announcers (Fox): Adam Amin, Greg Olsen and Pam Oliver
- Recap, Game Book

Game information

**First quarter**

- TB – Chris Godwin 4-yard pass from Baker Mayfield (Chase McLaughlin kick), 10:05. Buccaneers 7–0. **Drive: 8 plays, 74 yards, 4:55.**
- TB – Antoine Winfield Jr. 58-yard fumble return (Chase McLaughlin kick), 8:54. Buccaneers 14–0. **Drive: 3 plays, 27 yards, 1:23.**
- TB – Chase McLaughlin 26-yard field goal, 4:01. Buccaneers 17–0. **Drive: 8 plays, 71 yards, 3:56.**

**Second quarter**

- NO – Blake Grupe 42-yard field goal, 13:43. Buccaneers 17–3. **Drive: 11 plays, 56 yards, 5:18.**
- NO – Rashid Shaheed 54-yard punt return (Blake Grupe kick), 13:04. Buccaneers 17–10. **Drive: 3 plays, −17 yards, 0:39.**
- NO – Blake Grupe 29-yard field goal, 9:00. Buccaneers 17–13. **Drive: 6 plays, 17 yards, 3:24.**
- NO – Bub Means 10-yard pass from Spencer Rattler (Blake Grupe kick), 8:37. Saints 20–17. **Drive: 1 play, 10 yards, 0:04.**
- TB – Sean Tucker 36-yard pass from Baker Mayfield (Chase McLaughlin kick), 5:39. Buccaneers 24–20. **Drive: 6 plays, 76 yards, 2:58.**
- NO – Alvin Kamara 4-yard run (Blake Grupe kick), 2:47. Saints 27–24. **Drive: 7 plays, 70 yards, 2:52.**

**Third quarter**

- TB – Chris Godwin 55-yard pass from Baker Mayfield (Chase McLaughlin kick), 4:25. Buccaneers 31–27. **Drive: 7 plays, 92 yards, 4:13.**

**Fourth quarter**

- TB – Cade Otton 8-yard pass from Baker Mayfield (pass failed), 12:34. Buccaneers 37–27. **Drive: 5 plays, 58 yards, 2:21.**
- TB – Bucky Irving 1-yard run (Chase McLaughlin kick), 5:33. Buccaneers 44–27. **Drive: 10 plays, 71 yards, 6:03.**
- TB – Sean Tucker 5-yard run (Chase McLaughlin kick), 1:55. Buccaneers 51–27. **Drive: 6 plays, 64 yards, 2:24.**

**Top passers**

- TB – Baker Mayfield – 24/36, 325 yards, 4 TD, 3 INT
- NO – Spencer Rattler – 22/40, 243 yards, TD, 2 INT

**Top rushers**

- TB – Sean Tucker – 14 rushes, 136 yards, TD
- NO – Alvin Kamara – 13 rushes, 40 yards, TD

**Top receivers**

- TB – Chris Godwin – 11 receptions, 125 yards, TD
- NO – Foster Moreau – 2 receptions, 54 yards

The Saints had a halftime lead with rookie Spencer Rattler as the starting quarterback. However, they were dominated in the second half by the Buccaneers, resulting in a 51–27 loss. The Saints fell to 2–4. The Saints defense gave up 594 yards, the second-most in a single game in franchise history.

==== Week 7: vs. Denver Broncos ====
Week 7: Denver Broncos at New Orleans Saints – Game summary

Quarter	1	2	3	4	Total
**Broncos**	3	13	10	7	**33**
Saints	0	3	0	7	**10**

at Caesars Superdome, New Orleans, Louisiana

- Date: October 17
- Game time: 7:15 p.m. CDT
- Game weather: None (indoor stadium)
- Game attendance: 70,008
- Referee: Land Clark
- TV announcers (WDSU/Prime Video): Al Michaels, Kirk Herbstreit and Kaylee Hartung
- Recap, Game Book

Game information

**First quarter**

- DEN – Wil Lutz 46-yard field goal, 5:28. Broncos 3–0. **Drive: 9 plays, 52 yards, 5:04.**

**Second quarter**

- DEN – Wil Lutz 32-yard field goal, 13:24. Broncos 6–0. **Drive: 10 plays, 42 yards, 5:15.**
- DEN – Javonte Williams 8-yard run (Wil Lutz kick), 7:30. Broncos 13–0. **Drive: 8 plays, 86 yards, 4:44.**
- NO – Blake Grupe 35-yard field goal, 1:57. Broncos 13–3. **Drive: 11 plays, 62 yards, 5:33.**
- DEN – Wil Lutz 52-yard field goal, 0:16. Broncos 16–3. **Drive: 10 plays, 38 yards, 1:41.**

**Third quarter**

- DEN – Wil Lutz 38-yard field goal, 10:24. Broncos 19–3. **Drive: 7 plays, 46 yards, 3:45.**
- DEN – Javonte Williams 5-yard run (Wil Lutz kick), 5:53. Broncos 26–3. **Drive: 5 plays, 69 yards, 3:00.**

**Fourth quarter**

- DEN – Cody Barton 52-yard fumble return (Wil Lutz kick), 4:06. Broncos 33–3. **Drive: 6 plays, −1 yard, 2:04.**
- NO – Cedrick Wilson Jr. 12-yard pass from Jake Haener (Blake Grupe kick), 1:22. Broncos 33–10. **Drive: 11 plays, 79 yards, 2:44.**

**Top passers**

- DEN – Bo Nix – 16/26, 164 yards
- NO – Spencer Rattler – 25/35, 172 yards

**Top rushers**

- DEN – Javonte Williams – 14 rushes, 88 yards, 2 TD
- NO – Kendre Miller – 6 rushes, 36 yards

**Top receivers**

- DEN – Troy Franklin – 5 receptions, 50 yards
- NO – Cedrick Wilson Jr. – 6 receptions, 57 yards, TD

Sean Payton returned to New Orleans in a matchup between the Saints and Broncos. The Saints were embarrassed 33–10, falling to 2–5 and marking their first five-game losing streak since 2021.

==== Week 8: at Los Angeles Chargers ====
Week 8: New Orleans Saints at Los Angeles Chargers – Game summary

Quarter	1	2	3	4	Total
Saints	2	3	3	0	**8**
**Chargers**	0	9	7	10	**26**

at SoFi Stadium, Inglewood, California

- Date: October 27
- Game time: 3:05 p.m. CDT/1:05 p.m. PDT
- Game weather: Cloudy, 76 °F (24 °C) (fixed roof)
- Game attendance: 70,240
- Referee: Alan Eck
- TV announcers (Fox): Chris Myers, Mark Sanchez and Kristina Pink
- Recap, Game Book

Game information

**First quarter**

- NO – J. K. Scott fumble forced by Taysom Hill out of bounds in the end zone for a safety, 10:20. Saints 2–0.

**Second quarter**

- LAC – Cameron Dicker 46-yard field goal, 14:55. Chargers 3–2. **Drive: 6 plays, 56 yards, 2:43.**
- LAC – J. K. Dobbins 1-yard run (kick failed, wide left), 1:37. Chargers 9–2. **Drive: 15 plays, 90 yards, 8:07.**
- NO – Blake Grupe 40-yard field goal, 0:05. Chargers 9–5. **Drive: 9 plays, 48 yards, 1:32.**

**Third quarter**

- LAC – Ladd McConkey 60-yard pass from Justin Herbert (Cameron Dicker kick), 8:48. Chargers 16–5. **Drive: 2 plays, 61 yards, 0:48.**
- NO – Blake Grupe 43-yard field goal, 1:05. Chargers 16–8. **Drive: 8 plays, 45 yards, 3:45.**

**Fourth quarter**

- LAC – Cameron Dicker 29-yard field goal, 11:55. Chargers 19–8. **Drive: 7 plays, 54 yards, 4:10.**
- LAC – Ladd McConkey 9-yard pass from Justin Herbert (Cameron Dicker kick), 3:22. Chargers 26–8. **Drive: 9 plays, 66 yards, 3:23.**

**Top passers**

- NO – Spencer Rattler – 12/24, 156 yards
- LAC – Justin Herbert – 20/32, 279 yards, 2 TD

**Top rushers**

- NO – Alvin Kamara – 10 rushes, 67 yards
- LAC – J. K. Dobbins – 17 rushes, 57 yards, TD

**Top receivers**

- NO – Chris Olave – 8 receptions, 107 yards
- LAC – Ladd McConkey – 6 receptions, 111 yards, 2 TD

For the first time since the 2004 Season, the Saints lost to the Chargers. As a result, the Saints fell to 2–6, marking the first time they lost six consecutive games since 2005.

==== Week 9: at Carolina Panthers ====
Week 9: New Orleans Saints at Carolina Panthers – Game summary

Quarter	1	2	3	4	Total
Saints	6	7	3	6	**22**
**Panthers**	0	10	7	6	**23**

at Bank of America Stadium, Charlotte, North Carolina

- Date: November 3
- Game time: 1:00 p.m. EST/12:00 p.m. CST
- Game weather: Mostly sunny, 66 °F (19 °C)
- Game attendance: 70,292
- Referee: Ronald Torbert
- TV announcers (CBS): Tom McCarthy, Jay Feely and Amanda Balionis
- Recap, Game Book

Game information

**First quarter**

- NO – Blake Grupe 29-yard field goal, 10:51. Saints 3–0. **Drive: 10 plays, 67 yards, 4:09.**
- NO – Blake Grupe 33-yard field goal, 3:08. Saints 6–0. **Drive: 11 plays, 72 yards, 5:07.**

**Second quarter**

- CAR – Xavier Legette 3-yard pass from Bryce Young (Eddy Piñeiro kick), 9:59. Panthers 7–6. **Drive: 8 plays, 40 yards, 4:50.**
- NO – Taysom Hill 7-yard run (Blake Grupe kick), 4:13. Saints 13–7. **Drive: 9 plays, 78 yards, 5:46.**
- CAR – Eddy Piñeiro 48-yard field goal, 0:38. Saints 13–10. **Drive: 4 plays, −2 yards, 0:39.**

**Third quarter**

- CAR – Chuba Hubbard 1-yard run (Eddy Piñeiro kick), 9:55. Panthers 17–13. **Drive: 9 plays, 86 yards, 5:05.**
- NO – Blake Grupe 51-yard field goal, 4:15. Panthers 17–16. **Drive: 12 plays, 37 yards, 5:40.**

**Fourth quarter**

- NO – Foster Moreau 17-yard pass from Derek Carr (pass failed), 11:55. Saints 22–17. **Drive: 11 plays, 70 yards, 5:40.**
- CAR – Chuba Hubbard 16-yard run (pass failed), 2:18. Panthers 23–22. **Drive: 4 plays, 64 yards, 1:08.**

**Top passers**

- NO – Derek Carr – 18/31, 236 yards, TD
- CAR – Bryce Young – 16/26, 171 yards, TD, INT

**Top rushers**

- NO – Alvin Kamara – 29 rushes, 155 yards
- CAR – Chuba Hubbard – 15 rushes, 72 yards, 2 TD

**Top receivers**

- NO – Alvin Kamara – 6 receptions, 60 yards
- CAR – Ja'Tavion Sanders – 4 receptions, 87 yards

Quarterback Derek Carr returned to the starting lineup, but the Saints lost to the Panthers, marking the first time since the 1999 season to suffer a seven-game losing streak after falling to 2–7. This loss resulted in head coach Dennis Allen being fired.

==== Week 10: vs. Atlanta Falcons ====
Week 10: Atlanta Falcons at New Orleans Saints – Game summary

Quarter	1	2	3	4	Total
Falcons	0	7	10	0	**17**
**Saints**	0	17	3	0	**20**

at Caesars Superdome, New Orleans, Louisiana

- Date: November 10
- Game time: 12:00 p.m. CST
- Game weather: None (indoor stadium)
- Game attendance: 70,005
- Referee: Carl Cheffers
- TV announcers (Fox): Joe Davis, Greg Olsen and Pam Oliver
- Recap, Game Book

Game information

**First quarter**

- No scoring plays.

**Second quarter**

- NO – Blake Grupe 38-yard field goal, 14:50. Saints 3–0. **Drive: 11 plays, 36 yards, 5:43.**
- NO – Marquez Valdes-Scantling 40-yard pass from Derek Carr (Blake Grupe kick), 10:48. Saints 10–0. **Drive: 4 plays, 57 yards, 1:18.**
- ATL – Bijan Robinson 1-yard run (Younghoe Koo kick), 5:45. Saints 10–7. **Drive: 9 plays, 73 yards, 5:03.**
- NO – Marquez Valdes-Scantling 2-yard pass from Derek Carr (Blake Grupe kick), 3:47. Saints 17–7. **Drive: 4 plays, 70 yards, 1:58.**

**Third quarter**

- ATL – Younghoe Koo 27-yard field goal, 5:42. Saints 17–10. **Drive: 13 plays, 68 yards, 7:58.**
- NO – Blake Grupe 26-yard field goal, 2:44. Saints 20–10. **Drive: 6 plays, 61 yards, 2:58.**
- ATL – Bijan Robinson 37-yard run (Younghoe Koo kick), 1:01. Saints 20–17. **Drive: 4 plays, 63 yards, 1:43.**

**Fourth quarter**

- No scoring plays.

**Top passers**

- ATL – Kirk Cousins – 23/38, 306 yards, INT
- NO – Derek Carr – 16/25, 269 yards, 2 TD

**Top rushers**

- ATL – Bijan Robinson – 20 rushes, 116 yards, 2 TD
- NO – Alvin Kamara – 17 rushes, 55 yards

**Top receivers**

- ATL – Drake London – 8 receptions, 97 yards
- NO – Marquez Valdes-Scantling – 3 receptions, 109 yards, 2 TD

The Saints hosted the visiting Atlanta Falcons. With Younghoe Koo's three missed field goals, the Saints were able to hold on their lead for the whole game. After tackling one of the wide receivers for the Falcons, the Saints won 20–17 and snapped their seven-game losing streak to improve to 3–7, starting 1–0 under interim head coach Darren Rizzi.

==== Week 11: vs. Cleveland Browns ====
Week 11: Cleveland Browns at New Orleans Saints – Game summary

Quarter	1	2	3	4	Total
Browns	6	0	8	0	**14**
**Saints**	7	7	0	21	**35**

at Caesars Superdome, New Orleans, Louisiana

- Date: November 17
- Game time: 12:00 p.m. CST
- Game weather: None (indoor stadium)
- Game attendance: 70,006
- Referee: Alex Kemp
- TV announcers (Fox): Kenny Albert, Jonathan Vilma and Megan Olivi
- Recap, Game Book

Game information

**First quarter**

- NO – Taysom Hill 10-yard run (Blake Grupe kick), 9:54. Saints 7–0. **Drive: 6 plays, 49 yards, 2:34.**
- CLE – Jerry Jeudy 89-yard pass from Jameis Winston (pass failed), 1:52. Saints 7–6. **Drive: 1 play, 89 yards, 0:15.**

**Second quarter**

- NO – Marquez Valdes-Scantling 71-yard pass from Derek Carr (Blake Grupe kick), 12:40. Saints 14–6. **Drive: 3 plays, 80 yards, 1:34.**

**Third quarter**

- CLE – Elijah Moore 30-yard pass from Jameis Winston (Jameis Winston-David Njoku pass), 8:49. Tied 14–14. **Drive: 8 plays, 92 yards, 4:12.**

**Fourth quarter**

- NO – Taysom Hill 33-yard run (Blake Grupe kick), 13:22. Saints 21–14. **Drive: 9 plays, 77 yards, 4:56.**
- NO – Juwan Johnson 1-yard pass from Derek Carr (Blake Grupe kick), 6:04. Saints 28–14. **Drive: 6 plays, 35 yards, 2:56.**
- NO – Taysom Hill 75-yard run (Blake Grupe kick), 2:26. Saints 35–14. **Drive: 2 plays, 78 yards, 0:17.**

**Top passers**

- CLE – Jameis Winston – 30/46, 395 yards, 2 TD
- NO – Derek Carr – 21/27, 248 yards, 2 TD

**Top rushers**

- CLE – Nick Chubb – 11 rushes, 50 yards
- NO – Taysom Hill – 7 rushes, 138 yards, 3 TD

**Top receivers**

- CLE – Jerry Jeudy – 6 receptions, 142 yards, TD
- NO – Marquez Valdes-Scantling – 2 receptions, 87 yards, TD

The Saints faced their former teammate, Jameis Winston, and the Cleveland Browns. After being tied in the third quarter, Derek Carr and Taysom Hill rallied to 21 points in the fourth quarter, resulting in a 35–14 win. This improves their record to 4–7 and 2–0 under Rizzi.

==== Week 13: vs. Los Angeles Rams ====
Week 13: Los Angeles Rams at New Orleans Saints – Game summary

Quarter	1	2	3	4	Total
**Rams**	0	0	7	14	**21**
Saints	3	3	0	8	**14**

at Caesars Superdome, New Orleans, Louisiana

- Date: December 1
- Game time: 3:05 p.m. CST
- Game weather: None (indoor stadium)
- Game attendance: 70,006
- Referee: Brad Allen
- TV announcers (Fox): Kenny Albert, Jonathan Vilma and Megan Olivi
- Recap, Game Book

Game information

**First quarter**

- NO – Blake Grupe 54-yard field goal, 8:48. Saints 3–0. **Drive: 12 plays, 34 yards, 6:12.**

**Second quarter**

- NO – Blake Grupe 54-yard field goal, 0:02. Saints 6–0. **Drive: 11 plays, 51 yards, 1:48.**

**Third quarter**

- LAR – Kyren Williams 4-yard run (Joshua Karty kick), 8:50. Rams 7–6. **Drive: 11 plays, 70 yards, 6:10.**

**Fourth quarter**

- LAR – Demarcus Robinson 3-yard pass from Matthew Stafford (Joshua Karty kick), 14:57. Rams 14–6. **Drive: 4 plays, 82 yards, 2:06.**
- NO – Marquez Valdes-Scantling 28-yard pass from Derek Carr (Derek Carr–Dante Pettis pass), 11:53. Tied 14–14. **Drive: 6 plays, 70 yards, 3:04.**
- LAR – Puka Nacua 7-yard pass from Matthew Stafford (Joshua Karty kick), 8:54. Rams 21–14. **Drive: 8 plays, 56 yards, 2:59.**

**Top passers**

- LAR – Matthew Stafford – 14/24, 183 yards, 2 TD
- NO – Derek Carr – 24/37, 184 yards, TD

**Top rushers**

- LAR – Kyren Williams – 15 rushes, 104 yards, TD
- NO – Alvin Kamara – 23 rushes, 112 yards

**Top receivers**

- LAR – Puka Nacua – 5 receptions, 56 yards, TD
- NO – Taysom Hill – 5 receptions, 37 yards

Hosting the rival Rams, the Saints led 6–0 at halftime, shutting out the Rams in the first half for the first time under head coach Sean McVay. However, the Rams rallied to outscore the Saints 21–8 in the second half, winning 21–14 and dropping the Saints to 4–8 and to 2–1 under Rizzi.

In the fourth quarter, the Saints offense faced a devastating loss when Taysom Hill suffered a torn ACL, ending his season.

==== Week 14: at New York Giants ====
Week 14: New Orleans Saints at New York Giants – Game summary

Quarter	1	2	3	4	Total
**Saints**	7	0	7	0	**14**
Giants	0	3	0	8	**11**

at MetLife Stadium, East Rutherford, New Jersey

- Date: December 8
- Game time: 1:00 p.m. EST/12:00 p.m. CST
- Game weather: Fair, 54 °F (12 °C)
- Game attendance: 76,143
- Referee: Clete Blakeman
- TV announcers (Fox): Kevin Kugler, Daryl Johnston and Laura Okmin
- Recap, Game Book

Game information

**First quarter**

- NO – Kendre Miller 8-yard run (Blake Grupe kick), 1:19. Saints 7–0. **Drive: 9 plays, 98 yards, 5:11.**

**Second quarter**

- NYG – Graham Gano 43-yard field goal, 11:20. Saints 7–3. **Drive: 7 plays, 26 yards, 2:42.**

**Third quarter**

- NO – Juwan Johnson 11-yard pass from Derek Carr (Blake Grupe kick), 3:40. Saints 14–3. **Drive: 9 plays, 69 yards, 4:41.**

**Fourth quarter**

- NYG – Tyrone Tracy Jr. 1-yard run (Drew Lock-Malik Nabers pass), 4:11. Saints 14–11. **Drive: 13 plays, 82 yards, 6:03.**

**Top passers**

- NO – Derek Carr – 20/31, 219 yards, TD, INT
- NYG – Drew Lock – 21/49, 227 yards, INT

**Top rushers**

- NO – Alvin Kamara – 17 rushes, 44 yards
- NYG – Drew Lock – 5 rushes, 59 yards

**Top receivers**

- NO – Marquez Valdes-Scantling – 4 receptions, 51 yards
- NYG – Malik Nabers – 5 receptions, 79 yards

The Saints blocked an attempted field goal by the Giants near the end of the game to win and move to 5–8.

==== Week 15: vs. Washington Commanders ====
Week 15: Washington Commanders at New Orleans Saints – Game summary

Quarter	1	2	3	4	Total
**Commanders**	7	7	3	3	**20**
Saints	0	0	7	12	**19**

at Caesars Superdome, New Orleans, Louisiana

- Date: December 15
- Game time: 12:00 p.m. CST
- Game weather: None (indoor stadium)
- Game attendance: 70,003
- Referee: Shawn Hochuli
- TV announcers (Fox): Kenny Albert, Jonathan Vilma and Megan Olivi
- Recap, Game Book

Game information

**First quarter**

- WAS – Terry McLaurin 16-yard pass from Jayden Daniels (Greg Joseph kick), 5:28. Commanders 7–0. **Drive: 12 plays, 56 yards, 6:39.**

**Second quarter**

- WAS – Terry McLaurin 3-yard pass from Jayden Daniels (Greg Joseph kick), 5:38. Commanders 14–0. **Drive: 10 plays, 53 yards, 5:47.**

**Third quarter**

- WAS – Greg Joseph 23-yard field goal, 8:12. Commanders 17–0. **Drive: 11 plays, 63 yards, 6:48.**
- NO – Alvin Kamara 21-yard pass from Cedrick Wilson Jr. (Blake Grupe kick), 5:45. Commanders 17–7. **Drive: 6 plays, 71 yards, 2:27.**

**Fourth quarter**

- WAS – Greg Joseph 41-yard field goal, 14:56. Commanders 20–7. **Drive: 9 plays, 45 yards, 5:49.**
- NO – Blake Grupe 41-yard field goal, 11:09. Commanders 20–10. **Drive: 9 plays, 51 yards, 3:47.**
- NO – Blake Grupe 51-yard field goal, 6:57. Commanders 20–13. **Drive: 7 plays, 59 yards, 1:09.**
- NO – Foster Moreau 1-yard pass from Spencer Rattler (pass failed), 0:00. Commanders 20–19. **Drive: 11 plays, 56 yards, 1:55.**

**Top passers**

- WAS – Jayden Daniels – 25/31, 226 yards, 2 TD
- NO – Spencer Rattler – 10/21, 135 yards, TD

**Top rushers**

- WAS – Jayden Daniels – 11 rushes, 66 yards
- NO – Kendre Miller – 9 rushes, 46 yards

**Top receivers**

- WAS – Terry McLaurin – 7 receptions, 73 yards, 2 TD
- NO – Marquez Valdes-Scantling – 2 receptions, 64 yards

The Saints hosted the Washington Commanders in week 15, falling just short of a late game comeback after a failed two-point conversion. They dropped to 5–9, officially clinching a losing season for the second time in three seasons.

==== Week 16: at Green Bay Packers ====
Week 16: New Orleans Saints at Green Bay Packers – Game summary

Quarter	1	2	3	4	Total
Saints	0	0	0	0	**0**
**Packers**	7	14	3	10	**34**

at Lambeau Field, Green Bay, Wisconsin

- Date: December 23
- Game time: 7:15 p.m. CST
- Game weather: Cloudy, 34 °F (1 °C)
- Game attendance: 77,885
- Referee: Alex Kemp
- TV announcers (ESPN/ABC): Joe Buck, Troy Aikman and Lisa Salters
- Recap, Game Book

Game information

**First quarter**

- GB – Dontayvion Wicks 2-yard pass from Jordan Love (Brandon McManus kick), 8:41. Packers 7–0. **Drive: 10 plays, 63 yards, 6:19.**

**Second quarter**

- GB – Josh Jacobs 2-yard run (Brandon McManus kick), 11:43. Packers 14–0. **Drive: 17 plays, 96 yards, 8:55.**
- GB – Chris Brooks 1-yard run (Brandon McManus kick), 6:28. Packers 21–0. **Drive: 6 plays, 67 yards, 2:57.**

**Third quarter**

- GB – Brandon McManus 55-yard field goal, 7:03. Packers 24–0. **Drive: 10 plays, 47 yards, 5:11.**

**Fourth quarter**

- GB – Brandon McManus 46-yard field goal, 7:13. Packers 27–0. **Drive: 9 plays, 56 yards, 4:37.**
- GB – Emanuel Wilson 1-yard run (Brandon McManus kick), 2:41. Packers 34–0. **Drive: 7 plays, 48 yards, 3:03.**

**Top passers**

- NO – Spencer Rattler – 15/30, 153 yards, INT
- GB – Jordan Love – 16/28, 182 yards, TD

**Top rushers**

- NO – Spencer Rattler – 5 rushes, 28 yards
- GB – Josh Jacobs – 13 rushes, 69 yards, TD

**Top receivers**

- NO – Foster Moreau – 2 receptions, 33 yards
- GB – Jayden Reed – 3 receptions, 76 yards

This was the first shutout in the 2024 NFL Season. Before this game, New Orleans was mathematically eliminated from playoff contention with the Atlanta Falcons' win over the New York Giants.

==== Week 17: vs. Las Vegas Raiders ====
Week 17: Las Vegas Raiders at New Orleans Saints – Game summary

Quarter	1	2	3	4	Total
**Raiders**	3	10	3	9	**25**
Saints	0	10	0	0	**10**

at Caesars Superdome, New Orleans, Louisiana

- Date: December 29
- Game time: 12:00 p.m. CST
- Game weather: None (indoor stadium)
- Game attendance: 70,031
- Referee: Land Clark
- TV announcers (Fox): Adam Amin, Mark Sanchez and Kristina Pink
- Recap, Game Book

Game information

**First quarter**

- LV – Daniel Carlson 31-yard field goal, 5:49. Raiders 3–0. **Drive: 17 plays, 60 yards, 9:11.**

**Second quarter**

- NO – Foster Moreau 30-yard pass from Spencer Rattler (Blake Grupe kick), 14:52. Saints 7–3. **Drive: 3 plays, 50 yards, 0:53.**
- LV – Daniel Carlson 39-yard field goal, 10:19. Saints 7–6. **Drive: 8 plays, 53 yards, 4:33.**
- LV – Jakobi Meyers 3-yard pass from Aidan O'Connell (Daniel Carlson kick), 0:57. Raiders 13–7. **Drive: 9 plays, 95 yards, 3:24.**
- NO – Blake Grupe 34-yard field goal, 0:00. Raiders 13–10. **Drive: 7 plays, 54 yards, 0:57.**

**Third quarter**

- LV – Daniel Carlson 54-yard field goal, 7:57. Raiders 16–10. **Drive: 10 plays, 49 yards, 4:56.**

**Fourth quarter**

- LV – Daniel Carlson 25-yard field goal, 14:14. Raiders 19–10. **Drive: 12 plays, 54 yards, 5:37.**
- LV – Tre Tucker 18-yard pass from Aidan O'Connell (kick blocked), 8:20. Raiders 25–10. **Drive: 6 plays, 40 yards, 3:02.**

**Top passers**

- LV – Aidan O'Connell – 20/35, 242 yards, 2 TD
- NO – Spencer Rattler – 20/36, 218 yards, TD, 2 INT

**Top rushers**

- LV – Ameer Abdullah – 20 rushes, 115 yards
- NO – Spencer Rattler – 3 rushes, 46 yards

**Top receivers**

- LV – Brock Bowers – 7 receptions, 77 yards
- NO – Juwan Johnson – 6 receptions, 66 yards

With the loss, the Saints dropped to 5–11, clinching their worst record since 2005. Additionally, the Saints were also swept by the AFC West.

==== Week 18: at Tampa Bay Buccaneers ====
Week 18: New Orleans Saints at Tampa Bay Buccaneers – Game summary

Quarter	1	2	3	4	Total
Saints	3	13	3	0	**19**
**Buccaneers**	3	3	7	14	**27**

at Raymond James Stadium, Tampa, Florida

- Date: January 5
- Game time: 1:00 p.m. EST/12:00 p.m. CST
- Game weather: Clear, 68 °F (20 °C)
- Game attendance: 63,001
- Referee: Adrian Hill
- TV announcers (Fox): Kevin Burkhardt, Tom Brady, Erin Andrews and Tom Rinaldi
- Recap, Game Book

Game information

**First quarter**

- NO – Blake Grupe 35-yard field goal, 9:16. Saints 3–0. **Drive: 11 plays, 54 yards, 5:44.**
- TB – Chase McLaughlin 52-yard field goal, 4:51. Tied 3–3. **Drive: 9 plays, 43 yards, 4:25.**

**Second quarter**

- NO – Blake Grupe 39-yard field goal, 14:52. Saints 6–3. **Drive: 10 plays, 49 yards, 4:59.**
- NO – Dante Pettis 5-yard pass from Spencer Rattler (Blake Grupe kick), 6:14. Saints 13–3. **Drive: 14 plays, 79 yards, 7:36.**
- TB – Chase McLaughlin 25-yard field goal, 1:03. Saints 13–6. **Drive: 12 plays, 63 yards, 5:11.**
- NO – Blake Grupe 39-yard field goal, 0:07. Saints 16–6. **Drive: 10 plays, 49 yards, 0:56.**

**Third quarter**

- TB – Payne Durham 6-yard pass from Baker Mayfield (Chase McLaughlin kick), 10:27. Saints 16–13. **Drive: 10 plays, 72 yards, 4:33.**
- NO – Blake Grupe 49-yard field goal, 5:53. Saints 19–13. **Drive: 4 plays, 6 yards, 1:36.**

**Fourth quarter**

- TB – Jalen McMillan 32-yard pass from Baker Mayfield (Chase McLaughlin kick), 10:09. Buccaneers 20–19. **Drive: 12 plays, 82 yards, 7:09.**
- TB – Bucky Irving 11-yard run (Chase McLaughlin kick), 1:51. Buccaneers 27–19. **Drive: 12 plays, 94 yards, 5:47.**

**Top passers**

- NO – Spencer Rattler – 26/42, 240 yards, TD
- TB – Baker Mayfield – 21/32, 221 yards, 2 TD, INT

**Top rushers**

- NO – Clyde Edwards-Helaire – 8 rushes, 26 yards
- TB – Bucky Irving – 19 rushes, 89 yards, TD

**Top receivers**

- NO – Juwan Johnson – 6 receptions, 80 yards
- TB – Mike Evans – 9 receptions, 89 yards

With the loss, the Saints finished last in the NFC South for the first time since 2008.

=== Standings ===
==== Division ====
NFC South
	W	L	T	PCT	DIV	CONF	PF	PA	STK
^{(3)} Tampa Bay Buccaneers	10	7	0	.588	4–2	8–4	502	385	W2
Atlanta Falcons	8	9	0	.471	4–2	7–5	389	423	L2
Carolina Panthers	5	12	0	.294	2–4	4–8	341	534	W1
New Orleans Saints	5	12	0	.294	2–4	4–8	338	398	L4

==== Conference ====
NFC
Seed	Team	Division	W	L	T	PCT	DIV	CONF	SOS	SOV	STK
**Division leaders**
1	Detroit Lions	North	15	2	0	.882	6–0	11–1	.516	.494	W3
2	Philadelphia Eagles	East	14	3	0	.824	5–1	9–3	.453	.424	W2
3 (Note: Tampa Bay clinched the #3 seed over Los Angeles based on conference record. (Tampa Bay 8–4 to Los Angeles 6–6))	Tampa Bay Buccaneers	South	10	7	0	.588	4–2	8–4	.502	.465	W2
4 (Note: Los Angeles clinched the NFC West and #4 seed over Seattle based on strength of victory. (Los Angeles .441 to Seattle .424))	Los Angeles Rams	West	10	7	0	.588	4–2	6–6	.505	.441	L1
**Wild cards**
5	Minnesota Vikings	North	14	3	0	.824	4–2	9–3	.474	.408	L1
6	Washington Commanders	East	12	5	0	.706	4–2	9–3	.436	.358	W5
7	Green Bay Packers	North	11	6	0	.647	1–5	6–6	.533	.412	L2
**Did not qualify for the postseason**
8	Seattle Seahawks	West	10	7	0	.588	4–2	6–6	.498	.424	W2
9 (Note: Atlanta finished ahead of Arizona based on conference record. (Atlanta 7–5 to Arizona 4–8))	Atlanta Falcons	South	8	9	0	.471	4–2	7–5	.519	.426	L2
10	Arizona Cardinals	West	8	9	0	.471	3–3	4–8	.536	.404	W1
11	Dallas Cowboys	East	7	10	0	.412	3–3	5–7	.522	.387	L2
12	San Francisco 49ers	West	6	11	0	.353	1–5	4–8	.564	.402	L4
13 (Note: Chicago finished ahead of Carolina based on head-to-head victory.)	Chicago Bears	North	5	12	0	.294	1–5	3–9	.554	.388	W1
14 (Note: Carolina finished ahead of New Orleans based on strength of victory. (Carolina .329 to New Orleans .306))	Carolina Panthers	South	5	12	0	.294	2–4	4–8	.498	.329	W1
15	New Orleans Saints	South	5	12	0	.294	2–4	4–8	.505	.306	L4
16	New York Giants	East	3	14	0	.176	0–6	1–11	.554	.412	L1
