= Darren Rizzi =

American football coach (born 1970)

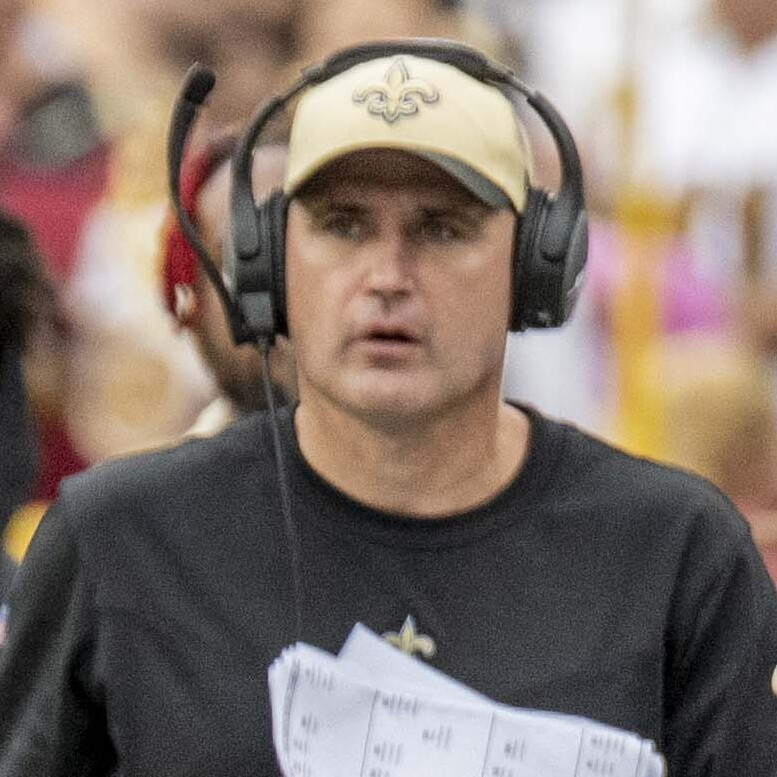
- Rizzi in 2021

Denver Broncos
- Title: Assistant head coach & special teams coordinator

Personal information
- Born: July 21, 1970 (age 56); Hillsdale, New Jersey, U.S.

Career information
- High school: Bergen Catholic (Oradell, New Jersey)
- College: Rhode Island (1989–1992)

Career history
- Colgate (1993) Graduate assistant; New Haven (1994–1997); Special teams coordinator & defensive line coach (1994–1996); Defensive coordinator (1997); Northeastern (1998) Special teams coordinator & linebackers coach; New Haven (1999–2001) Head coach; Rutgers (2002–2007) Special teams coordinator; Rhode Island (2008) Head coach; Miami Dolphins (2009–2018); Assistant special teams coach (2009); Special teams coordinator (2010–2016); Associate head coach & special teams coordinator (2017–2018); New Orleans Saints (2019–2024); Special teams coordinator (2019–2021); Assistant head coach & special teams coordinator (2022–2024); Interim head coach (2024); Denver Broncos (2025–present) Assistant head coach & special teams coordinator

Head coaching record
- Regular season: 3–5 (.375)
- Career: NFL: 3–5 (.375); NCAA: 18–23 (.439)
- Coaching profile at Pro Football Reference

Darren Rizzi (born July 21, 1970) is an American professional football coach who is the special teams coordinator and assistant head coach for the Denver Broncos of the National Football League (NFL). Previously, he served as the interim head coach for the New Orleans Saints during the 2024 season, replacing previous head coach Dennis Allen on November 4, 2024. He also served as the special teams coordinator for the Saints from 2019 to 2024 and the Miami Dolphins from 2010 to 2018.

Prior to coaching in the NFL, Rizzi was the head coach at the University of New Haven from 1999 to 2001 and at the University of Rhode Island in 2008. He compiled an overall record of 18–23. Rizzi has previously served as an assistant coach for the Miami Dolphins, Rutgers University, Northeastern University, the University of New Haven and Colgate University.

== Early life ==
Rizzi grew up in Hillsdale, New Jersey, and graduated from Bergen Catholic High School in nearby Oradell. He was later a resident of Oradell. He graduated from the University of Rhode Island.

== Coaching career ==
=== Early career ===
In 1993, Rizzi began his coaching career as a graduate assistant at Colgate University. He then served as the special teams coordinator and defensive line coach at the University of New Haven from 1994 to 1996 and he was promoted to defensive coordinator in 1997. In 1998, Rizzi served as the special teams coordinator and linebackers coach at Northeastern University.

=== New Haven ===
In 1999, Rizzi was named as head football coach at the University of New Haven. He was the head coach from 1999 to 2001 and compiled a 15–14 record.

=== Rutgers ===
In 2002, Rizzi joined Rutgers University as their special teams coordinator. He would serve in that capacity until 2007.

=== Rhode Island ===
In 2008, Rizzi was named the head football coach at the University of Rhode Island, his alma mater. In his lone season, Rizzi compiled a 3–9 record.

=== Miami Dolphins ===
In 2009, Rizzi was hired by the Miami Dolphins as their assistant special teams coach under head coach Tony Sparano. On October 5, 2010, Rizzi was promoted to special teams coordinator following the firing of John Bonamego. Rizzi coordinated the Miami Dolphins special teams efforts from 2011 to 2018, additionally serving as assistant head coach and special teams coordinator from 2015 to 2016 and associate head coach and special teams coordinator from 2017 to 2018. He was one of few Miami coaches to see multiple regimes. He interviewed for the head coach position for the Dolphins after the 2018 season. Rizzi was not retained under new head coach Brian Flores.

=== New Orleans Saints ===
On February 1, 2019, Rizzi was hired by the New Orleans Saints as their special teams coordinator under head coach Sean Payton. Rizzi would be reunited with Saints assistant head coach and tight ends coach Dan Campbell, who coached alongside Rizzi with the Miami Dolphins from 2010 to 2015, under head coaches Tony Sparano and Joe Philbin. On February 23, 2022, it was announced that Rizzi would be assuming the title of assistant head coach alongside his special teams responsibilities under head coach Dennis Allen.

On November 4, 2024, Rizzi was named the interim head coach of the Saints following the firing of head coach Dennis Allen after a 2–7 start of the 2024 season. Rizzi finished 3–5 as Saints head coach.

=== Denver Broncos ===
On February 14, 2025, Rizzi was hired by the Denver Broncos as their special teams coordinator and assistant head coach, reuniting him with Sean Payton. Rizzi and Payton coached together with the Saints from 2019–2021, when Payton was New Orleans' head coach.

== Personal life ==
Rizzi and his wife, Tracey, have five children together: two daughters, Mackenzie and Alexandra, and three sons, Christian, Casey and Cameron.

== Head coaching record ==
=== College ===
Year	Team	Overall	Conference	Standing	Bowl/playoffs
New Haven Chargers (NCAA Division II independent) (1999–2001)
1999	New Haven	5–5			
2000	New Haven	5–5			
2001	New Haven	5–4			
New Haven:		15–14			
Rhode Island Rams (Colonial Athletic Association) (2008)
2008	Rhode Island	3–9	1–7	T–5th (North)	
Rhode Island:		3–9	1–7		
Total:		18–23			

=== NFL ===
Team	Year	Regular season					Postseason			
Team	Year	Won	Lost	Ties	Win %	Finish	Won	Lost	Win %	Result
NO*	2024	3	5	0	.375	4th in NFC South	—	—	—	—
Total		3	5	0	.375		0	0	.000	

* Interim head coach
