= Millard Bradford =

American football player (born 1999)

Profile
- Position: Safety

Personal information
- Born: September 24, 1999 (age 27); Helotes, Texas, U.S.
- Listed height: 5 ft 10 in (1.78 m)
- Listed weight: 191 lb (87 kg)

Career information
- High school: Sandra Day O'Connor (Helotes, Texas); Fork Union Military Academy (Fork Union, Virginia)
- College: TCU (2019–2023)
- NFL draft: 2024: undrafted

Career history
- New Orleans Saints (2024); Chicago Bears (2025)*; Calgary Stampeders (2026)*; Saskatchewan Roughriders (2026)*
- * Offseason or practice squad member only

Career NFL statistics as of 2025
- Games played: 3
- Tackles: 3
- Stats at Pro Football Reference
- Stats at CFL.ca

Millard Bradford (born September 24, 1999) is an American professional football safety. He played college football for the TCU Horned Frogs.

== Early life ==
Bradford was born on September 24, 1999, and grew up in Helotes, Texas. He attended Sandra Day O'Connor High School in Helotes, then spent a postgraduate year at Fork Union Military Academy in Virginia, playing football as a defensive back at both. He committed to play college football for the TCU Horned Frogs.

== College career ==
Bradford appeared in all 12 games as a true freshman at TCU in 2019, totaling 23 tackles. He then appeared in 10 games in 2020, recording 44 tackles and 6.5 tackles-for-loss (TFLs), and 11 games in 2021, eight as a starter, finishing fourth on the team with 52 tackles and 2.5 TFLs. He helped the Horned Frogs reach the national championship in 2022, placing fifth on the team with 58 tackles while starting all 12 games and having eight pass breakups. He returned for a final season in 2023, recording 54 tackles, six passes defended and two interceptions. He was an honorable mention All-Big Ten Conference selection in both 2022 and 2023 and was invited to the NFL Scouting Combine at the conclusion of his collegiate career.

== Professional career ==
Pre-draft measurables
| Height | Weight | Arm length | Hand span | 40-yard dash | 10-yard split | 20-yard split | 20-yard shuttle | Three-cone drill | Vertical jump | Broad jump | Bench press |
|---|---|---|---|---|---|---|---|---|---|---|---|
| 5 ft 10 1/2 in (1.79 m) | 191 lb (87 kg) | 31 1/4 in (0.79 m) | 9 in (0.23 m) | 4.42 s | 1.55 s | 2.60 s | 4.30 s | 7.08 s | 38.5 in (0.98 m) | 10 ft 4 in (3.15 m) | 15 reps |
All values from NFL Combine/Pro Day

=== New Orleans Saints ===
After going unselected in the 2024 NFL draft, Bradford signed with the New Orleans Saints as an undrafted free agent. He was waived by the Saints on August 27, 2024, then re-signed to the practice squad the following day. He was signed off the practice squad to the active roster on November 2, prior to the team's Week 9 game against the Carolina Panthers. Bradford was waived on November 30 and re-signed to the practice squad four days later.

Bradford signed a reserve/future contract with New Orleans on January 6, 2025. On May 12, Bradford was waived by the Saints.

=== Chicago Bears ===
On August 12, 2025, Bradford signed with the Chicago Bears. He was waived on August 25.

=== Calgary Stampeders ===
On January 23, 2026, Bradford signed with the Calgary Stampeders of the Canadian Football League (CFL). He was released on May 13.

=== Saskatchewan Roughriders ===
On July 20, 2026, Bradford signed with the Saskatchewan Roughriders of the Canadian Football League (CFL). He was released on August 22. On September 20, Bradford was re-signed to the practice roster. On September 28, he was released.
