= Dennis Allen (American football) =

American football player and coach (born 1972)

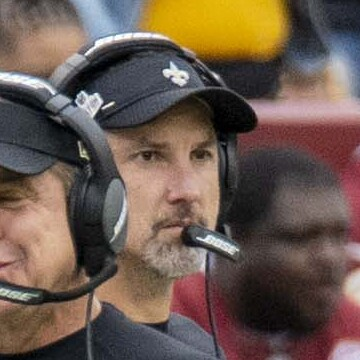
- Allen in 2021

Chicago Bears
- Title: Defensive coordinator

Personal information
- Born: September 22, 1972 (age 54); Atlanta, Georgia, U.S.

Career information
- Position: Safety
- High school: L. D. Bell (Hurst, Texas)
- College: Texas A&M (1992–1995)
- NFL draft: 1996: undrafted

Career history

Playing
- Buffalo Bills (1996)*
- * Offseason or practice squad member only

Coaching
- Texas A&M (1996–1999) Graduate assistant; Tulsa (2000–2001) Secondary coach; Atlanta Falcons (2002–2005); Defensive quality control coordinator (2002–2003); Defensive assistant (2004–2005); New Orleans Saints (2006–2010); Assistant defensive line coach (2006–2007); Secondary coach (2008–2010); Denver Broncos (2011) Defensive coordinator; Oakland Raiders (2012–2014) Head coach; New Orleans Saints (2015–2024); Senior defensive assistant (2015); Defensive coordinator (2015–2021); Head coach (2022–2024); Chicago Bears (2025–present) Defensive coordinator

Awards and highlights
- Super Bowl champion (XLIV); Second-team All-SWC (1994)

Head coaching record
- Regular season: 26–53 (.329)
- Postseason: 0–0 (–)
- Career: 26–53 (.329)
- Coaching profile at Pro Football Reference

Dennis James Allen (born September 22, 1972) is an American professional football coach and former safety who is the defensive coordinator for the Chicago Bears of the National Football League (NFL). He previously served as head coach of the Oakland Raiders and New Orleans Saints, and has served as an assistant coach for the Texas A&M Aggies, Tulsa Golden Hurricane, Atlanta Falcons, and Denver Broncos.

== Early life and playing career ==
Born in Atlanta when his father, Grady Allen, was playing for the Atlanta Falcons, Allen grew up in Hurst, Texas near Fort Worth and graduated from L. D. Bell High School. Allen attended Texas A&M University and played as a safety on R. C. Slocum's "Wrecking Crew" defense. In 1993 Allen made an interception in the fourth quarter that secured an 18–9 win for Texas A&M over rival Texas. In the 1994 and 1995 seasons, Allen started the final 21 games of his collegiate career and was part of a defensive unit that ranked in the top five in the nation. Allen earned a B.B.A. in management from Texas A&M’s Mays Business School in 1995. In 1996, Allen signed with the Buffalo Bills as an undrafted free agent but was cut during training camp.

== Coaching career ==
=== Early coaching career ===
Allen began his coaching career at his alma mater Texas A&M, as a graduate assistant coach under his former coach R. C. Slocum. Holding that position from 1996 to 1999, Allen worked mostly with the secondary while pursuing a master's degree in kinesiology from the Texas A&M College of Education. He completed his degree in 1998. From 2000 to 2001, Allen coached the secondary at Tulsa.

=== Atlanta Falcons ===
With the Atlanta Falcons, Allen was a defensive quality control coach from 2002 to 2003, then a defensive assistant from 2004 to 2005.

=== New Orleans Saints (first stint) ===
Allen then moved to the New Orleans Saints, as defensive line coach from 2006 to 2007 before being secondary coach from 2008 to 2010. The Saints won Super Bowl XLIV in 2009, in which the Saints ranked 3rd in interceptions despite giving up 321 yards per game.

=== Denver Broncos ===
After his success with the Saints' secondary, he was hired to be the Denver Broncos’ defensive coordinator. The Broncos defense was in the bottom half of yards allowed, ranked 23rd, but were 5th in the league in sacks in 2011.

=== Oakland Raiders ===
On January 24, 2012, Oakland Raiders' general manager Reggie McKenzie hired Allen as the team's 18th head coach. He was the first Raiders defense-oriented head coach since John Madden's retirement after the 1978 season, because the team's longtime former owner Al Davis (until his death during the 2011 season) preferred offensive-minded head coaches. At the age of 39, he was also the youngest head coach in the league.

In his first season as head coach, the Raiders struggled as they finished the 2012 season with a record of 4–12. That offseason, the Raiders were facing salary cap problems and had traded away most of their draft picks prior to Allen's arrival, which did not allow him to establish his system with the right players. In the middle of the 2013 season, Allen decided to bench quarterback Terrelle Pryor (who was injured) for undrafted rookie Matt McGloin, in hopes of salvaging the rest of the season. Later, Pryor continued to be benched although he was healthy enough to return. The Raiders finished with a 4–12 record in the 2013 season.

On September 29, 2014, following a 38–14 loss to the Miami Dolphins and beginning the 2014 NFL season with 4 straight losses, Allen was fired.

=== New Orleans Saints (second stint) ===
The Saints rehired Allen as senior defensive assistant on January 20, 2015. After Rob Ryan was fired later in the season, on November 16, Allen was promoted to defensive coordinator. On November 29, Allen's first game as defensive coordinator, the Saints were defeated by the Houston Texans 24–6. His defense gave up 362 yards while recording one sack and one interception in the loss.

On December 19, 2021, Allen briefly stepped in for Sean Payton as interim head coach of the Saints after Payton tested positive for COVID-19. Allen served as interim head coach during the Saints' Week 15 matchup against the Tampa Bay Buccaneers, where the Saints defeated the Buccaneers on Sunday Night Football, 9–0.

Following Sean Payton's retirement on January 25, Allen was promoted to head coach of the New Orleans Saints on February 8, 2022. On December 10, the NFL fined Allen $100,000 for defensive end Cameron Jordan faking an injury in the Week 13 game against the Tampa Bay Buccaneers. The fine was later rescinded after a successful appeal by Jordan. In the 2022 season, he led the team to a 7–10 record. The team improved to a 9–8 mark in the 2023 season but failed to make the postseason.

On November 4, 2024, following a 23–22 loss to the Carolina Panthers in Week 9 of the 2024 season (the seventh straight loss for the Saints after a 2–0 start), Allen was fired.

=== Chicago Bears ===
On January 28, 2025, the Chicago Bears announced Allen as their defensive coordinator. His defense led the league with turnovers forced in the 2025 season, at 32.

== Personal life ==
His father Grady Allen was also a standout linebacker for the Aggies and later in the NFL for the Falcons. Dennis and his wife, Alisson, have a son, Garrison, and a daughter, Layla.

== Head coaching record ==
Team	Year	Regular season					Postseason			
Team	Year	Won	Lost	Ties	Win %	Finish	Won	Lost	Win %	Result
OAK	2012	4	12	0	.250	3rd in AFC West	—	—	—	—
OAK	2013	4	12	0	.250	4th in AFC West	—	—	—	—
OAK	2014	0	4	0	.000	Fired	—	—	—	—
OAK total		8	28	0	.222		—	—	—	
NO	2022	7	10	0	.412	3rd in NFC South	—	—	—	—
NO	2023	9	8	0	.529	2nd in NFC South	—	—	—	—
NO	2024	2	7	0	.222	Fired	—	—	—	—
NO total		18	25	0	.419		—	—	—	
Total		26	53	0	.329		—	—	—	
