= 2024 Minnesota Vikings season =

64th season in franchise history

- Owner: Zygi Wilf
- General manager: Kwesi Adofo-Mensah
- Head coach: Kevin O'Connell
- Offensive coordinator: Wes Phillips
- Defensive coordinator: Brian Flores
- Home stadium: U.S. Bank Stadium

Results
- Record: 14–3
- Division place: 2nd NFC North
- Playoffs: Lost Wild Card Playoffs (at Rams) 9–27
- All-Pros: 3: LS Andrew DePaola (1st team); WR Justin Jefferson (1st team); OLB Andrew Van Ginkel (2nd team)
- Pro Bowlers: 7: QB Sam Darnold (reserve); LS Andrew DePaola (starter); OLB Jonathan Greenard (starter); WR Justin Jefferson (starter); CB Byron Murphy (starter); OT Brian O’Neill (alternate); OLB Andrew Van Ginkel (starter)

Uniform
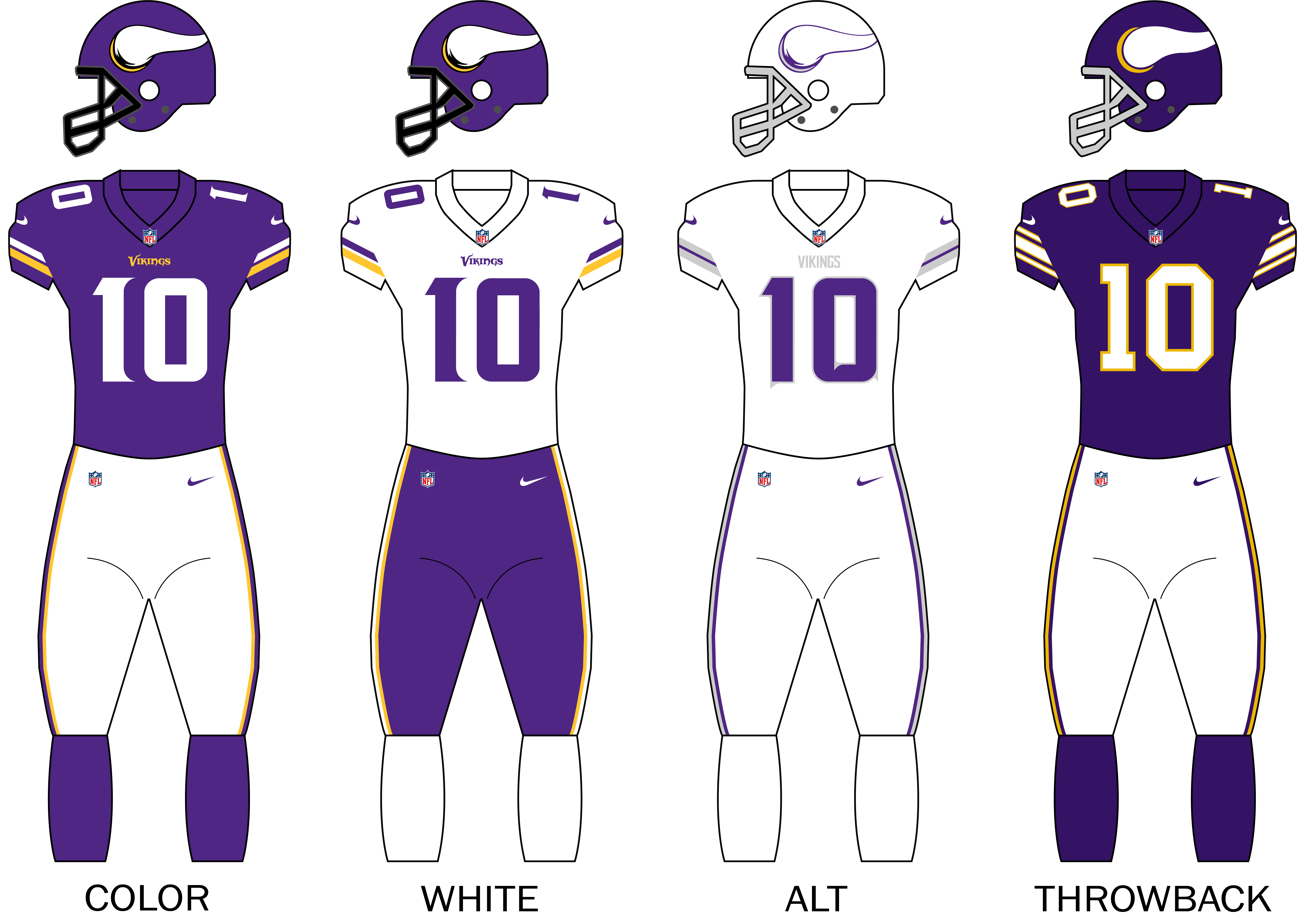

The 2024 season was the Minnesota Vikings' 64th in the National Football League (NFL), their ninth playing their home games at U.S. Bank Stadium, their 20th under the ownership of Zygi Wilf and their third under the head coach/general manager tandem of Kevin O'Connell and Kwesi Adofo-Mensah. The Vikings improved on their 7–10 record from 2023 after a Week 11 win over the Tennessee Titans and made the playoffs after a one-year absence.

After six seasons, the team lost starting quarterback Kirk Cousins when he signed with the Atlanta Falcons in the offseason. Despite the team being in a rebuilding year with very low expectations, they started 11–2 for the first time since 2009, anchored by a stout defensive unit and strong performance by quarterback Sam Darnold. In Week 15, they clinched a playoff berth when the Seattle Seahawks lost to the Green Bay Packers. After their win against the Packers in Week 17 to improve to 14–2, the Vikings achieved their best season since going 15–1 in 1998 with their 14th win. However, the Vikings ended their season with two blowout losses: first to the division rival Detroit Lions in their Week 18 game, which clinched the 1st seed for the Lions, then to the rival Los Angeles Rams in the wild card round, which eliminated the Vikings from the playoffs. All four of the team's losses this season happened at the hands of the Lions and the Rams during back-to-back weeks. The Vikings became the first 14-win wild card team in NFL history, but their loss to the Rams meant they set a new record for the most wins by a team that failed to reach the divisional round of the playoffs in the Super Bowl era. The Vikings became the first team since the 2004 Pittsburgh Steelers to lose double-digit games in one season and finish the next with 14+ wins.

On June 6, 2024, the Vikings unveiled their new "Winter Warrior" uniform, which is all-white and features the first white helmet in franchise history.

The team's first round pick in the 2024 NFL draft, J. J. McCarthy, missed the season after getting surgery on a knee injury he sustained during a preseason game. Because of this, he did not play his first snap in a Viking uniform until 2025.

== Offseason ==
=== Players lost ===
Position	Player	New team	Date
RB	Alexander Mattison	Las Vegas Raiders	Released on March 4
DE	Dean Lowry	Pittsburgh Steelers	Released on March 12
OT	Hakeem Adeniji	Cleveland Browns	Signed on March 13
QB	Kirk Cousins	Atlanta Falcons	Signed on March 13
DE	Marcus Davenport	Detroit Lions	Signed on March 13
LB	Jordan Hicks	Cleveland Browns	Signed on March 13
LB	D. J. Wonnum	Carolina Panthers	Signed on March 13
LB	Danielle Hunter	Houston Texans	Signed on March 14
C	Austin Schlottmann	New York Giants	Signed on March 15
NT	Khyiris Tonga	Arizona Cardinals	Signed on March 15
QB	Joshua Dobbs	San Francisco 49ers	Signed on March 19
LB	Troy Dye	Los Angeles Chargers	Signed on March 19
WR	K. J. Osborn	New England Patriots	Signed on March 19
OT	Oli Udoh	New Orleans Saints	Signed on March 19
K	Greg Joseph	Green Bay Packers	Signed on March 28

=== Players added ===
Position	Player	Former team	Date
RB	Aaron Jones	Green Bay Packers	Signed on March 12
LB	Blake Cashman	Houston Texans	Signed on March 13
QB	Sam Darnold	San Francisco 49ers	Signed on March 13
LB	Jonathan Greenard	Houston Texans	Signed on March 13
K	John Parker Romo	Chicago Bears	Signed on March 13
LB	Andrew Van Ginkel	Miami Dolphins	Signed on March 13
WR	Trent Sherfield	Buffalo Bills	Signed on March 14
DE	Jerry Tillery	Las Vegas Raiders	Signed on March 14
G	Dan Feeney	Chicago Bears	Signed on March 15
DE	Jonah Williams	Los Angeles Rams	Signed on March 18
CB	Shaquill Griffin	Carolina Panthers	Signed on March 19
LB	Kamu Grugier-Hill	Carolina Panthers	Signed on March 20
LB	Jihad Ward	New York Giants	Signed on March 20
TE	Robert Tonyan	Chicago Bears	Signed on May 16
CB	Fabian Moreau	Denver Broncos	Signed on July 31
QB	Matt Corral	Birmingham Stallions	Signed on August 16
CB	Stephon Gilmore	Dallas Cowboys	Signed on August 18

=== Draft ===
2024 Minnesota Vikings draft selections
Round	Selection	Player	Position	College	Notes
1	10	J. J. McCarthy	QB	Michigan	From Jets (Note: The Vikings traded first-, fourth- and fifth-round selections (11th, 129th and 157th overall) to the New York Jets in exchange for first- and sixth-round selections (10th and 203rd overall).)
1	11	Traded to the New York Jets			
1	17	Dallas Turner	OLB	Alabama	From Jaguars (Note: The Vikings traded first- and fifth-round selections (23rd and 167th overall), and 2025 third- and fourth-round selections to the Jacksonville Jaguars in exchange for a first-round selection (17th overall).)
1	23	Traded to the Jacksonville Jaguars			From Browns via Texans (Note: The Vikings traded second- and sixth-round selections (42nd and 188th overall), and a 2025 second-round selection to the Houston Texans in exchange for first- and seventh-round selections (23rd and 232nd overall).)
2	42	Traded to the Houston Texans			
3	73	Traded to the Detroit Lions (Note: The Vikings traded a third-round selection (73rd overall) and a 2023 second-round selection to the Detroit Lions in exchange for a conditional fourth-round selection (129th overall), a 2023 fourth-round selection and TE T. J. Hockenson. The fourth-round selection would have become a fifth-rounder if the Vikings won a playoff game in 2022.)			
4	108	Khyree Jackson	CB	Oregon	
4	129	Traded to the New York Jets			From Lions
5	146	Traded to the Philadelphia Eagles (Note: The Vikings traded a fifth-round selection (146th overall) and a 2023 seventh-round selection to the Philadelphia Eagles in exchange for WR Jalen Reagor.)			
5	157	Traded to the New York Jets			From Browns (Note: The Vikings traded 2025 sixth- and seventh-round selections, and DE Za'Darius Smith to the Cleveland Browns in exchange for a fifth-round selection (157th overall) and a 2025 fifth-round selection.)
5	167	Traded to the Jacksonville Jaguars			From Chiefs (Note: The Vikings traded a 2023 fourth-round selection to the Kansas City Chiefs in exchange for a fifth-round selection (167th overall) and a 2023 fourth-round selection.)
6	177	Walter Rouse	OT	Oklahoma	From Panthers via Jaguars (Note: The Vikings traded G Ezra Cleveland to the Jacksonville Jaguars in exchange for a sixth-round selection (177th overall).)
6	186	Traded to the Arizona Cardinals (Note: The Vikings traded a sixth-round selection (186th overall) to the Arizona Cardinals in exchange for a seventh-round selection (230th overall) and QB Joshua Dobbs.)			
6	188	Traded to the Houston Texans			From Raiders via Patriots (Note: The Vikings traded OT Vederian Lowe to the New England Patriots in exchange for a sixth-round selection (188th overall).)
6	203	Will Reichard	K	Alabama	From Texans via Browns, Broncos and Jets
7	229	Traded to the Las Vegas Raiders (Note: The Vikings traded a seventh-round selection (229th overall) to the Las Vegas Raiders in exchange for QB Nick Mullens.)			
7	230	Michael Jurgens	C	Wake Forest	From Falcons via Browns and Cardinals
7	232	Levi Drake Rodriguez	DT	Texas A&M–Commerce	From Broncos via 49ers and Texans

2024 Minnesota Vikings undrafted free agents
Name	Position	College	Ref.
Matt Cindric	G	California	
K. J. Cloyd	LB	Miami (FL)	
Jeremy Flax	OT	Kentucky	
Dallas Gant	LB	Toledo	
Devron Harper	WR	Mercer	
Ty James	WR	Mercer	
Jeshaun Jones	WR	Maryland	
Trey Knox	TE	South Carolina	
Tyler Manoa	DE	Arizona	
Donovan Manuel	LB	FIU	
Dwight McGlothern	CB	Arkansas	
Gabriel Murphy	OLB	UCLA	
Doug Nester	G	West Virginia	
Owen Porter	OLB	Marshall	
Bo Richter	OLB	Air Force	
Spencer Rolland	OT	North Carolina	
Taki Taimani	DT	Oregon	

Draft trades

== Staff ==
2024 Minnesota Vikings staff
Front office: Owner/chairman – Zygi Wilf; Owner/vice chairman – Leonard Wilf; Owner/president – Mark Wilf; Chief operating officer – Andrew Miller; General manager – Kwesi Adofo-Mensah; Executive vice president of football operations – Rob Brzezinski; Senior vice president of player personnel – Ryan Grigson; Vice president of football operations – Demitrius Washington; Director of player personnel – Ryan Monnens; Assistant director of player personnel – Chisom Opara; Director of pro personnel – Sam DeLuca; Director of college scouting – Mike Sholiton; Assistant director of college scouting – Pat Roberts; Senior personnel executive – Jamaal Stephenson; Head coaches: Head coach – Kevin O'Connell; Assistant head coach/outside linebackers – Mike Pettine; Assistant to the head coach – Henry Schneider IV; Offensive coaches: Offensive coordinator – Wes Phillips; Assistant offensive coordinator/assistant quarterbacks – Grant Udinski; Quarterbacks – Josh McCown; Running game coordinator/running backs – Curtis Modkins; Wide receivers – Keenan McCardell; Assistant wide receivers – Tony Sorrentino; Passing game coordinator/tight ends – Brian Angelichio; Offensive line – Chris Kuper; Assistant offensive line – Shaun Sarrett; Pass game specialist/game management coordinator – Ryan Cordell; Senior offensive assistant – Chris O'Hara; Quality control/offense – Derron Montgomery; Offensive assistant – Ben Ellefson	Defensive coaches: Defensive coordinator – Brian Flores; Defensive line – Marcus Dixon; Assistant defensive line – Patrick Hill; Inside linebackers – Mike Siravo; Assistant inside linebackers – Thad Bogardus; Passing game coordinator/defensive backs – Daronte Jones; Safeties – Michael Hutchings; Quality control/defense – Lance Bennett; Defensive assistant – Imarjaye Albury; Special teams coaches: Special teams coordinator – Matt Daniels; Assistant special teams – Dalmin Gibson; Strength and conditioning: Director of player performance – Josh Hingst; Director of football development/Assistant performance coach – Derik Keyes; Assistant player performance – Marquis Johnson

== Final roster ==
2024 Minnesota Vikings roster
Quarterbacks (QB): 14 Sam Darnold; 13 Daniel Jones; 12 Nick Mullens; Running backs (RB): 27 Cam Akers; 32 Ty Chandler; 30 C. J. Ham FB; 33 Aaron Jones; Wide receivers (WR): 3 Jordan Addison; 18 Justin Jefferson; 83 Jalen Nailor; 4 Brandon Powell; 11 Trent Sherfield; Tight ends (TE): 87 T. J. Hockenson; 86 Johnny Mundt; 84 Josh Oliver	Offensive linemen (OL): 56 Garrett Bradbury C; 64 Blake Brandel G; 69 Dan Feeney C; 67 Ed Ingram G; 65 Michael Jurgens G; 75 Brian O'Neill T; 76 David Quessenberry T; 66 Dalton Risner G; 74 Cam Robinson T; 78 Walter Rouse T; Defensive linemen (DL): 90 Jonathan Bullard; 97 Harrison Phillips; 61 Jalen Redmond; 50 Levi Drake Rodriguez; 99 Jerry Tillery	Linebackers (LB): 6 Brian Asamoah LB; 51 Blake Cashman LB; 58 Jonathan Greenard OLB; 54 Kamu Grugier-Hill LB; 91 Patrick Jones II OLB; 0 Ivan Pace Jr. LB; 98 Bo Richter OLB; 15 Dallas Turner OLB; 43 Andrew Van Ginkel OLB; 52 Jihad Ward OLB; Defensive backs (DB): 24 Camryn Bynum S; 2 Stephon Gilmore CB; 1 Shaquill Griffin CB; 26 Theo Jackson S; 29 Dwight McGlothern CB; 44 Josh Metellus S; 23 Fabian Moreau CB; 7 Byron Murphy CB; 22 Harrison Smith S; 20 Jay Ward S; Special teams (ST): 42 Andrew DePaola LS; 16 Will Reichard K; 17 Ryan Wright P	Practice squad: 68 Henry Byrd G (PS/I); 92 Jonathan Harris DL; 81 Lucky Jackson WR; 8 Trishton Jackson WR; 72 Marcellus Johnson T; 82 Jeshaun Jones WR; 28 Bobby McCain S; 48 Calvin Munson LB; 59 Gabriel Murphy OLB; 34 Nick Muse TE; 35 Sammis Reyes TE (IPP); 19 Brett Rypien QB; 36 Zavier Scott RB; 38 Ambry Thomas CB; 89 Thayer Thomas WR; 45 Max Tooley LB; 72 Leroy Watson T; 25 Nahshon Wright CB; Reserve: 5 Mekhi Blackmon CB (IR); 71 Christian Darrisaw T (IR); 9 J. J. McCarthy QB (IR); -- Trevor Reid OL (Futures); 94 Taki Taimani DL (IR/DFR); -- NaJee Thompson CB (IR); Rookies in italics 53 active, 6 reserve, 16 practice squad (2 exempt)

== Preseason ==
=== Schedule ===
The Vikings' preseason opponents and preliminary schedule was announced on May 15, in conjunction with the release of the regular season schedule.

Week	Date	Opponent	Result	Record	Venue	Recap
1	August 10	Las Vegas Raiders	W 24–23	1–0	U.S. Bank Stadium	Recap
2	August 17	at Cleveland Browns	W 27–12	2–0	Cleveland Browns Stadium	Recap
3	August 24	at Philadelphia Eagles	W 26–3	3–0	Lincoln Financial Field	Recap

=== Game summaries ===
==== Week 1: vs. Las Vegas Raiders ====
Preseason Week 1: Las Vegas Raiders at Minnesota Vikings – Game summary

Quarter	1	2	3	4	Total
Raiders	3	17	0	3	23
Vikings	0	7	14	3	24

at U.S. Bank Stadium, Minneapolis, Minnesota

- Date: August 10
- Game time: 3:00 p.m.
- Game weather: None (indoor stadium)
- Game attendance: 66,704
- Referee: Ronald Torbert (62)
- TV announcers (KMSP): Paul Allen, Pete Bercich, Ben Leber
- Recap, Game Book

Game information

First quarter

- LV – Daniel Carlson 31-yard field goal, 1:37. Raiders 3–0. Drive: 15 plays, 83 yards, 7:42.

Second quarter

- LV – D. J. Turner 20-yard pass from Gardner Minshew (Daniel Carlson kick), 11:01. Raiders 10–0. Drive: 6 plays, 67 yards, 2:30.
- MIN – Kene Nwangwu 48-yard run (Will Reichard kick), 9:38. Raiders 10–7. Drive: 3 plays, 76 yards, 1:23.
- LV – Zamir White 2-yard run (Daniel Carlson kick), 5:23. Raiders 17–7. Drive: 9 plays, 74 yards, 4:15.
- LV – Daniel Carlson 56-yard field goal, 1:05. Raiders 20–7. Drive: 4 plays, 2 yards, 0:46.

Third quarter

- MIN – Trishton Jackson 45-yard pass from J. J. McCarthy (Will Reichard kick), 11:33. Raiders 20–14. Drive: 4 plays, 61 yards, 1:36.
- MIN – Trent Sherfield 33-yard pass from J. J. McCarthy (Will Reichard kick), 6:33. Vikings 21–20. Drive: 6 plays, 63 yards, 2:24.

Fourth quarter

- LV – Daniel Carlson 23-yard field goal, 9:43. Raiders 23–21. Drive: 11 plays, 45 yards, 6:20.
- MIN – Will Reichard 37-yard field goal, 0:00. Vikings 24–23. Drive: 9 plays, 39 yards, 1:31.

Top passers

- LV – Gardner Minshew – 6/12, 117 yards, TD
- MIN – J. J. McCarthy – 11/17, 188 yards, 2 TD, INT

Top rushers

- LV – Sincere McCormick – 11 rushes, 32 yards
- MIN – Kene Nwangwu – 5 rushes, 52 yards, TD

Top receivers

- LV – Tre Tucker – 2 receptions, 73 yards
- MIN – Trishton Jackson – 4 receptions, 100 yards, TD

==== Week 2: at Cleveland Browns ====
Preseason Week 2: Minnesota Vikings at Cleveland Browns – Game summary

Quarter	1	2	3	4	Total
Vikings	10	3	7	7	27
Browns	7	0	3	2	12

at Cleveland Browns Stadium, Cleveland, Ohio

- Date: August 17
- Game time: 3:25 p.m.
- Game weather: Cloudy, 83 °F (28 °C)
- Game attendance: 68,035
- Referee: Clete Blakeman (34)
- TV announcers (KMSP): Paul Allen, Pete Bercich, Ben Leber
- Recap, Game Book

Game information

First quarter

- MIN – Trishton Jackson 14-yard pass from Nick Mullens (Will Reichard kick), 11:45. Vikings 7–0. Drive: 8 plays, 75 yards, 3:15.
- CLE – D'Onta Foreman 1-yard run (Cade York kick), 7:18. Tied 7–7. Drive: 8 plays, 69 yards, 4:27.
- MIN – Will Reichard 41-yard field goal, 4:26. Vikings 10–7. Drive: 9 plays, 47 yards, 2:52.

Second quarter

- MIN – Will Reichard 38-yard field goal, 7:41. Vikings 13–7. Drive: 11 plays, 39 yards, 4:17.

Third quarter

- MIN – Malik Knowles 1-yard pass from Jaren Hall (Will Reichard kick), 10:14. Vikings 20–7. Drive: 2 plays, 8 yards, 0:44.
- CLE – Cade York 33-yard field goal, 2:08. Vikings 20–10. Drive: 13 plays, 55 yards, 8:06.

Fourth quarter

- MIN – Jeshaun Jones 71-yard pass from Jaren Hall (Will Reichard kick), 10:20. Vikings 27–10. Drive: 5 plays, 94 yards, 2:42.
- CLE – Matt Corral fumble forced by Chris Williams out of bounds in end zone for a safety, 1:54. Vikings 27–12.

Top passers

- MIN – Nick Mullens – 11/21, 135 yards, TD
- CLE – Tyler Huntley – 14/20, 135 yards, 2 INT

Top rushers

- MIN – Myles Gaskin – 9 rushes, 45 yards
- MIN – Kene Nwangwu – 7 rushes, 45 yards
- CLE – Tyler Huntley – 4 rushes, 19 yards

Top receivers

- MIN – Jeshaun Jones – 1 reception, 71 yards, TD
- CLE – Zaire Mitchell-Paden – 4 receptions, 59 yards

==== Week 3: at Philadelphia Eagles ====
Preseason Week 3: Minnesota Vikings at Philadelphia Eagles – Game summary

Quarter	1	2	3	4	Total
Vikings	7	13	3	3	26
Eagles	0	3	0	0	3

at Lincoln Financial Field, Philadelphia, Pennsylvania

- Date: August 24
- Game time: 12:00 p.m.
- Game weather: Clear, 82 °F (28 °C)
- Game attendance: 69,679
- Referee: Adrian Hill (29)
- TV: KMSP
- Recap, Game Book

Game information

First quarter

- MIN – Trishton Jackson 8-yard pass from Jaren Hall (Will Reichard kick), 7:10. Vikings 7–0. Drive: 13 plays, 73 yards, 7:50.

Second quarter

- MIN – Will Reichard 31-yard field goal, 14:21. Vikings 10–0. Drive: 8 plays, 51 yards, 4:24.
- PHI – Jake Elliott 41-yard field goal, 10:15. Vikings 10–3. Drive: 9 plays, 50 yards, 4:06.
- MIN – Justin Hall 4-yard pass from Jaren Hall (Will Reichard kick), 3:09. Vikings 17–3. Drive: 13 plays, 80 yards, 7:06.
- MIN – Will Reichard 33-yard field goal, 0:19. Vikings 20–3. Drive: 8 plays, 34 yards, 1:06.

Third quarter

- MIN – Will Reichard 20-yard field goal, 11:24. Vikings 23–3. Drive: 7 plays, 24 yards, 3:28.

Fourth quarter

- MIN – Will Reichard 57-yard field goal, 2:15. Vikings 26–3. Drive: 5 plays, 16 yards, 2:06.

Top passers

- MIN – Jaren Hall – 17/25, 189 yards, 2 TD
- PHI – Tanner McKee – 13/21, 115 yards, INT

Top rushers

- MIN – Myles Gaskin – 13 rushes, 61 yards
- PHI – Tyrion Davis-Price – 12 rushes, 56 yards

Top receivers

- MIN – Lucky Jackson – 4 receptions, 53 yards
- PHI – Griffin Hebert – 3 receptions, 48 yards

== Regular season ==
=== Schedule ===
The Vikings' schedule for the 2024 NFL season was announced on May 15, 2024. In addition to home and away matchups against each of their NFC North divisional rivals, they were also scheduled to play against each of the teams in the NFC West and AFC South, as well as the teams that also finished in third place in each of the NFC South, NFC East and AFC East. Their AFC East opponent, the New York Jets, served as the opposition for the Vikings' home game at Tottenham Hotspur Stadium in London, which is part of the NFL International Series.

Week	Date	Opponent	Result	Record	Venue	Recap
1	September 8	at New York Giants	**W** 28–6	1–0	MetLife Stadium	Recap
2	September 15	San Francisco 49ers	**W** 23–17	2–0	U.S. Bank Stadium	Recap
3	September 22	Houston Texans	**W** 34–7	3–0	U.S. Bank Stadium	Recap
4	September 29	at **Green Bay Packers**	**W** 31–29	4–0	Lambeau Field	Recap
5	October 6	New York Jets	**W** 23–17	5–0	(United Kingdom) Tottenham Hotspur Stadium (London)	Recap
6	Bye					
7	October 20	**Detroit Lions**	**L** 29–31	5–1	U.S. Bank Stadium	Recap
8	October 24	at Los Angeles Rams	**L** 20–30	5–2	SoFi Stadium	Recap
9	November 3	Indianapolis Colts	**W** 21–13	6–2	U.S. Bank Stadium	Recap
10	November 10	at Jacksonville Jaguars	**W** 12–7	7–2	EverBank Stadium	Recap
11	November 17	at Tennessee Titans	**W** 23–13	8–2	Nissan Stadium	Recap
12	November 24	at **Chicago Bears**	**W** 30–27 (OT)	9–2	Soldier Field	Recap
13	December 1	Arizona Cardinals	**W** 23–22	10–2	U.S. Bank Stadium	Recap
14	December 8	Atlanta Falcons	**W** 42–21	11–2	U.S. Bank Stadium	Recap
15	December 16	**Chicago Bears**	**W** 30–12	12–2	U.S. Bank Stadium	Recap
16	December 22	at Seattle Seahawks	**W** 27–24	13–2	Lumen Field	Recap
17	December 29	**Green Bay Packers**	**W** 27–25	14–2	U.S. Bank Stadium	Recap
18	January 5	at **Detroit Lions**	**L** 9–31	14–3	Ford Field	Recap

Note: Intra-division opponents are in bold text.

=== Game summaries ===
==== Week 1: at New York Giants ====
Week 1: Minnesota Vikings at New York Giants – Game summary

Quarter	1	2	3	4	Total
**Vikings**	7	7	14	0	**28**
Giants	3	0	3	0	**6**

at MetLife Stadium, East Rutherford, New Jersey

- Date: September 8
- Game time: 1:00 p.m. EDT/12:00 p.m. CDT
- Game weather: A few clouds, 64 °F (18 °C)
- Game attendance: 81,908
- Referee: Alex Kemp (55)
- TV announcers (Fox): Kenny Albert, Jonathan Vilma and Megan Olivi
- Recap, Game Book

Game information

**First quarter**

- NYG – Graham Gano 23-yard field goal, 7:16. Giants 3–0. **Drive: 7 plays, 15 yards, 4:07.**
- MIN – Aaron Jones 3-yard run (Will Reichard kick), 3:50. Vikings 7–3. **Drive: 5 plays, 65 yards, 3:26.**

**Second quarter**

- MIN – Justin Jefferson 3-yard pass from Sam Darnold (Will Reichard kick), 6:55. Vikings 14–3. **Drive: 11 plays, 99 yards, 6:44.**

**Third quarter**

- MIN – Jalen Nailor 21-yard pass from Sam Darnold (Will Reichard kick), 12:08. Vikings 21–3. **Drive: 6 plays, 70 yards, 2:52.**
- NYG – Graham Gano 50-yard field goal, 6:08. Vikings 21–6. **Drive: 11 plays, 39 yards, 6:00.**
- MIN – Andrew Van Ginkel 10-yard interception return (Will Reichard kick), 4:22. Vikings 28–6.

**Fourth quarter**

- No scoring plays.

**Top passers**

- MIN – Sam Darnold – 19/24, 208 yards, 2 TD, INT
- NYG – Daniel Jones – 22/42, 186 yards, 2 INT

**Top rushers**

- MIN – Aaron Jones – 14 rushes, 94 yards, TD
- NYG – Devin Singletary – 10 rushes, 37 yards

**Top receivers**

- MIN – Justin Jefferson – 4 receptions, 59 yards, TD
- NYG – Malik Nabers – 5 receptions, 66 yards

==== Week 2: vs. San Francisco 49ers ====
Week 2: San Francisco 49ers at Minnesota Vikings – Game summary

Quarter	1	2	3	4	Total
49ers	0	7	0	10	**17**
**Vikings**	3	10	7	3	**23**

at U.S. Bank Stadium, Minneapolis, Minnesota

- Date: September 15
- Game time: 12:00 p.m. CDT
- Game weather: None (indoor stadium)
- Game attendance: 66,741
- Referee: Brad Allen (122)
- TV announcers (CBS): Kevin Harlan, Trent Green and Melanie Collins
- Recap, Game Book

Game information

**First quarter**

- MIN – Will Reichard 22-yard field goal, 4:45. Vikings 3–0. **Drive: 5 plays, 20 yards, 2:10.**

**Second quarter**

- MIN – Justin Jefferson 97-yard pass from Sam Darnold (Will Reichard kick), 9:35. Vikings 10–0. **Drive: 2 plays, 98 yards, 0:52.**
- SF – George Kittle 7-yard pass from Brock Purdy (Jake Moody kick), 1:53. Vikings 10–7. **Drive: 5 plays, 65 yards, 2:45.**
- MIN – Will Reichard 39-yard field goal, 0:00. Vikings 13–7. **Drive: 8 plays, 49 yards, 1:53.**

**Third quarter**

- MIN – Jalen Nailor 10-yard pass from Sam Darnold (Will Reichard kick), 6:49. Vikings 20–7. **Drive: 1 play, 10 yards, 0:04.**

**Fourth quarter**

- SF – Jordan Mason 10-yard run (Jake Moody kick), 10:16. Vikings 20–14. **Drive: 12 plays, 99 yards, 4:52.**
- MIN – Will Reichard 27-yard field goal, 3:30. Vikings 23–14. **Drive: 14 plays, 62 yards, 6:46.**
- SF – Jake Moody 31-yard field goal, 1:12. Vikings 23–17. **Drive: 9 plays, 57 yards, 2:18.**

**Top passers**

- SF – Brock Purdy – 28/36, 319 yards, TD, INT
- MIN – Sam Darnold – 17/26, 268 yards, 2 TD, INT

**Top rushers**

- SF – Jordan Mason – 20 rushes, 100 yards, TD
- MIN – Ty Chandler – 10 rushes, 82 yards

**Top receivers**

- SF – Deebo Samuel – 8 receptions, 110 yards
- MIN – Justin Jefferson – 4 receptions, 133 yards, TD

==== Week 3: vs. Houston Texans ====
Week 3: Houston Texans at Minnesota Vikings – Game summary

Quarter	1	2	3	4	Total
Texans	0	0	7	0	**7**
**Vikings**	14	0	7	13	**34**

at U.S. Bank Stadium, Minneapolis, Minnesota

- Date: September 22
- Game time: 12:00 p.m. CDT
- Game weather: None (indoor stadium)
- Game attendance: 66,843
- Referee: Shawn Hochuli (83)
- TV announcers (CBS): Ian Eagle, Charles Davis and Evan Washburn
- Recap, Game Book

Game information

**First quarter**

- MIN – Justin Jefferson 6-yard pass from Sam Darnold (Will Reichard kick), 12:03. Vikings 7–0. **Drive: 6 plays, 21 yards, 2:21.**
- MIN – Aaron Jones 8-yard pass from Sam Darnold (Will Reichard kick), 1:08. Vikings 14–0. **Drive: 6 plays, 56 yards, 3:23.**

**Second quarter**

- No scoring plays.

**Third quarter**

- MIN – Jalen Nailor 4-yard pass from Sam Darnold (Will Reichard kick), 10:22. Vikings 21–0. **Drive: 8 plays, 77 yards, 4:38.**
- HOU – Cam Akers 8-yard pass from C. J. Stroud (Kaʻimi Fairbairn kick), 3:56. Vikings 21–7. **Drive: 7 plays, 72 yards, 3:31.**

**Fourth quarter**

- MIN – Will Reichard 35-yard field goal, 14:53. Vikings 24–7. **Drive: 10 plays, 43 yards, 4:03.**
- MIN – Johnny Mundt 2-yard pass from Sam Darnold (Will Reichard kick), 10:14. Vikings 31–7. **Drive: 7 plays, 53 yards, 3:47.**
- MIN – Will Reichard 58-yard field goal, 4:43. Vikings 34–7. **Drive: 6 plays, 15 yards, 3:06.**

**Top passers**

- HOU – C. J. Stroud – 20/31, 215 yards, TD, 2 INT
- MIN – Sam Darnold – 17/28, 181 yards, 4 TD

**Top rushers**

- HOU – Cam Akers – 9 rushes, 21 yards
- MIN – Aaron Jones – 19 rushes, 102 yards

**Top receivers**

- HOU – Stefon Diggs – 10 receptions, 94 yards
- MIN – Justin Jefferson – 6 receptions, 81 yards, TD

==== Week 4: at Green Bay Packers ====
Week 4: Minnesota Vikings at Green Bay Packers – Game summary

Quarter	1	2	3	4	Total
**Vikings**	14	14	0	3	**31**
Packers	0	7	0	22	**29**

at Lambeau Field, Green Bay, Wisconsin

- Date: September 29
- Game time: 12:00 p.m. CDT
- Game weather: Sunny, 71 °F (22 °C)
- Game attendance: 78,335
- Referee: Bill Vinovich (52)
- TV announcers (CBS): Kevin Harlan, Trent Green and Melanie Collins
- Recap, Game Book

Game information

**First quarter**

- MIN – Jordan Addison 29-yard pass from Sam Darnold (Will Reichard kick), 11:53. Vikings 7–0. **Drive: 6 plays, 73 yards, 3:07.**
- MIN – Josh Oliver 2-yard pass from Sam Darnold (Will Reichard kick), 1:37. Vikings 14–0. **Drive: 8 plays, 73 yards, 5:10.**

**Second quarter**

- MIN – Jordan Addison 7-yard run (Will Reichard kick), 11:50. Vikings 21–0. **Drive: 7 plays, 46 yards, 3:30.**
- MIN – Justin Jefferson 14-yard pass from Sam Darnold (Will Reichard kick), 5:28. Vikings 28–0. **Drive: 1 play, 4 yards, 0:27.**
- GB – Jayden Reed 15-yard pass from Jordan Love (Brayden Narveson kick), 0:15. Vikings 28–7. **Drive: 2 plays, 3 yards, 0:24.**

**Third quarter**

- No scoring plays.

**Fourth quarter**

- GB – Dontayvion Wicks 6-yard pass from Jordan Love (Brayden Narveson kick), 11:38. Vikings 28–14. **Drive: 11 plays, 89 yards, 3:55.**
- GB – Tucker Kraft 13-yard pass from Jordan Love (Jordan Love–Tucker Kraft pass), 10:16. Vikings 28–22. **Drive: 2 plays, 20 yards, 0:27.**
- MIN – Will Reichard 33-yard field goal, 6:50. Vikings 31–22. **Drive: 7 plays, 55 yards, 3:26.**
- GB – Dontayvion Wicks 17-yard pass from Jordan Love (Brayden Narveson kick), 0:56. Vikings 31–29. **Drive: 5 plays, 96 yards, 1:22.**

**Top passers**

- MIN – Sam Darnold – 20/28, 275 yards, 3 TD, INT
- GB – Jordan Love – 32/54, 389 yards, 4 TD, 3 INT

**Top rushers**

- MIN – Aaron Jones – 22 rushes, 93 yards
- GB – Josh Jacobs – 9 rushes, 51 yards

**Top receivers**

- MIN – Justin Jefferson – 6 receptions, 85 yards, TD
- GB – Jayden Reed – 7 receptions, 139 yards, TD

==== Week 5: vs. New York Jets ====
NFL London games

Week 5: New York Jets at Minnesota Vikings – Game summary

Quarter	1	2	3	4	Total
Jets	0	7	3	7	**17**
**Vikings**	10	7	0	6	**23**

at Tottenham Hotspur Stadium, London, England

- Date: October 6
- Game time: 2:30 p.m. BST/8:30 a.m. CDT
- Game weather: Cloudy, 59 °F (15 °C)
- Game attendance: 61,139
- Referee: Scott Novak (1)
- TV announcers (NFLN): Rich Eisen, Kurt Warner, Stacey Dales and Jamie Erdahl
- Recap, Game Book

Game information

**First quarter**

- MIN – Will Reichard 54-yard field goal, 7:41. Vikings 3–0. **Drive: 11 plays, 52 yards, 5:46.**
- MIN – Andrew Van Ginkel 63-yard interception return (Will Reichard kick), 2:18. Vikings 10–0.

**Second quarter**

- MIN – C. J. Ham 2-yard run (Will Reichard kick), 3:58. Vikings 17–0. **Drive: 8 plays, 74 yards, 4:48.**
- NYJ – Allen Lazard 14-yard pass from Aaron Rodgers (Greg Zuerlein kick), 0:36. Vikings 17–7. **Drive: 5 plays, 31 yards, 0:46.**

**Third quarter**

- NYJ – Greg Zuerlein 32-yard field goal, 0:50. Vikings 17–10. **Drive: 17 plays, 83 yards, 6:51.**

**Fourth quarter**

- MIN – Will Reichard 53-yard field goal, 12:07. Vikings 20–10. **Drive: 4 plays, 2 yards, 0:56.**
- NYJ – Garrett Wilson 1-yard pass from Aaron Rodgers (Greg Zuerlein kick), 6:04. Vikings 20–17. **Drive: 8 plays, 42 yards, 3:43.**
- MIN – Will Reichard 41-yard field goal, 3:07. Vikings 23–17. **Drive: 9 plays, 47 yards, 2:57.**

**Top passers**

- NYJ – Aaron Rodgers – 29/54, 244 yards, 2 TD, 3 INT
- MIN – Sam Darnold – 14/31, 179 yards, INT

**Top rushers**

- NYJ – Breece Hall – 9 rushes, 23 yards
- MIN – Ty Chandler – 14 rushes, 30 yards

**Top receivers**

- NYJ – Garrett Wilson – 13 receptions, 101 yards, TD
- MIN – Justin Jefferson – 6 receptions, 92 yards

==== Week 7: vs. Detroit Lions ====
Week 7: Detroit Lions at Minnesota Vikings – Game summary

Quarter	1	2	3	4	Total
**Lions**	0	21	7	3	**31**
Vikings	10	0	7	12	**29**

at U.S. Bank Stadium, Minneapolis, Minnesota

- Date: October 20
- Game time: 12:00 p.m. CDT
- Game weather: None (indoor stadium)
- Game attendance: 66,971
- Referee: Clay Martin (19)
- TV announcers (Fox): Adam Amin, Greg Olsen and Pam Oliver
- Recap, Game Book

Game information

**First quarter**

- MIN – Aaron Jones 34-yard run (Will Reichard kick), 11:43. Vikings 7–0. **Drive: 2 plays, 34 yards, 0:48.**
- MIN – Will Reichard 57-yard field goal, 5:34. Vikings 10–0. **Drive: 9 plays, 41 yards, 4:36.**

**Second quarter**

- DET – Jahmyr Gibbs 45-yard run (Jake Bates kick), 13:42. Vikings 10–7. **Drive: 5 plays, 69 yards, 2:09.**
- DET – Amon-Ra St. Brown 35-yard pass from Jared Goff (Jake Bates kick), 8:39. Lions 14–10. **Drive: 5 plays, 83 yards, 2:45.**
- DET – Jahmyr Gibbs 8-yard run (Jake Bates kick), 0:26. Lions 21–10. **Drive: 9 plays, 72 yards, 5:13.**

**Third quarter**

- MIN – Justin Jefferson 25-yard pass from Sam Darnold (Will Reichard kick), 10:42. Lions 21–17. **Drive: 9 plays, 80 yards, 4:18.**
- DET – Kalif Raymond 21-yard pass from Jared Goff (Jake Bates kick), 5:43. Lions 28–17. **Drive: 9 plays, 70 yards, 4:59.**

**Fourth quarter**

- MIN – Will Reichard 42-yard field goal, 14:24. Lions 28–20. **Drive: 9 plays, 46 yards, 6:19.**
- MIN – Will Reichard 48-yard field goal, 6:04. Lions 28–23. **Drive: 7 plays, 61 yards, 4:06.**
- MIN – Ivan Pace Jr. 36-yard fumble return (pass failed), 5:50. Vikings 29–28.
- DET – Jake Bates 44-yard field goal, 0:15. Lions 31–29. **Drive: 8 plays, 44 yards, 2:17.**

**Top passers**

- DET – Jared Goff – 22/25, 280 yards, 2 TD
- MIN – Sam Darnold – 22/27, 259 yards, TD, INT

**Top rushers**

- DET – Jahmyr Gibbs – 15 rushes, 116 yards, 2 TD
- MIN – Aaron Jones – 14 rushes, 93 yards, TD

**Top receivers**

- DET – Amon-Ra St. Brown – 8 receptions, 112 yards, TD
- MIN – Justin Jefferson – 7 receptions, 81 yards, TD

==== Week 8: at Los Angeles Rams ====
Week 8: Minnesota Vikings at Los Angeles Rams – Game summary

Quarter	1	2	3	4	Total
Vikings	14	0	3	3	**20**
**Rams**	7	7	7	9	**30**

at SoFi Stadium, Inglewood, California

- Date: October 24
- Game time: 7:15 p.m. CDT/5:15 p.m. PDT
- Game weather: Sunny, 66 °F (19 °C)
- Game attendance: 72,127
- Referee: Tra Blake (3)
- TV announcers (KMSP/Prime Video): Al Michaels, Kirk Herbstreit and Kaylee Hartung
- Recap, Game Book

Game information

**First quarter**

- MIN – Josh Oliver 5-yard pass from Sam Darnold (Will Reichard kick), 10:43. Vikings 7–0. **Drive: 8 plays, 70 yards, 4:17.**
- LAR – Kyren Williams 5-yard pass from Matthew Stafford (Joshua Karty kick), 6:38. Tied 7–7. **Drive: 9 plays, 70 yards, 4:05.**
- MIN – Trent Sherfield 10-yard pass from Sam Darnold (Will Reichard kick), 0:53. Vikings 14–7. **Drive: 10 plays, 70 yards, 5:45.**

**Second quarter**

- LAR – Cooper Kupp 7-yard pass from Matthew Stafford (Joshua Karty kick), 10:05. Tied 14–14. **Drive: 10 plays, 70 yards, 5:48.**

**Third quarter**

- MIN – Will Reichard 23-yard field goal, 6:22. Vikings 17–14. **Drive: 11 plays, 68 yards, 5:46.**
- LAR – Demarcus Robinson 25-yard pass from Matthew Stafford (Joshua Karty kick), 2:36. Rams 21–17. **Drive: 8 plays, 70 yards, 3:46.**

**Fourth quarter**

- MIN – Will Reichard 35-yard field goal, 12:47. Rams 21–20. **Drive: 9 plays, 53 yards, 4:49.**
- LAR – Demarcus Robinson 10-yard pass from Matthew Stafford (Joshua Karty kick), 6:17. Rams 28–20. **Drive: 10 plays, 70 yards, 6:30.**
- LAR – Sam Darnold sacked in the end zone by Byron Young for a safety, 1:36. Rams 30–20.

**Top passers**

- MIN – Sam Darnold – 18/25, 240 yards, 2 TD
- LAR – Matthew Stafford – 25/34, 279 yards, 4 TD, INT

**Top rushers**

- MIN – Aaron Jones – 19 rushes, 58 yards
- LAR – Kyren Williams – 23 rushes, 97 yards

**Top receivers**

- MIN – Justin Jefferson – 8 receptions, 115 yards
- LAR – Puka Nacua – 7 receptions, 106 yards

Several sports media outlets and fans heavily criticized the officiating at the end of the game, as the referees missed a face mask penalty on Byron Young when he sacked Sam Darnold in the end zone, sealing the win for the Rams. Blake and the other umpires claim they were unable to see it with the other players blocking them.

==== Week 9: vs. Indianapolis Colts ====
Week 9: Indianapolis Colts at Minnesota Vikings – Game summary

Quarter	1	2	3	4	Total
Colts	0	7	0	6	**13**
**Vikings**	0	0	14	7	**21**

at U.S. Bank Stadium, Minneapolis, Minnesota

- Date: November 3
- Game time: 7:20 p.m. CST
- Game weather: None (indoor stadium)
- Game attendance: 66,954
- Referee: Shawn Smith (14)
- TV announcers (NBC): Mike Tirico, Cris Collinsworth and Melissa Stark
- Recap, Game Book

Game information

**First quarter**

- No scoring plays.

**Second quarter**

- IND – Kenny Moore II 38-yard fumble return (Matt Gay kick), 10:56. Colts 7–0.

**Third quarter**

- MIN – Jordan Addison 4-yard pass from Sam Darnold (Will Reichard kick), 10:23. Tied 7–7. **Drive: 9 plays, 70 yards, 4:37.**
- MIN – Jalen Nailor 7-yard pass from Sam Darnold (Will Reichard kick), 2:49. Vikings 14–7. **Drive: 9 plays, 80 yards, 5:04.**

**Fourth quarter**

- IND – Matt Gay 42-yard field goal, 12:41. Vikings 14–10. **Drive: 4 plays, 2 yards, 1:32.**
- MIN – Josh Oliver 14-yard pass from Sam Darnold (Will Reichard kick), 2:05. Vikings 21–10. **Drive: 8 plays, 60 yards, 3:15.**
- IND – Matt Gay 54-yard field goal, 0:28. Vikings 21–13. **Drive: 6 plays, 34 yards, 1:37.**

**Top passers**

- IND – Joe Flacco – 16/27, 179 yards, INT
- MIN – Sam Darnold – 28/34, 290 yards, 3 TD, 2 INT

**Top rushers**

- IND – Jonathan Taylor – 13 rushes, 48 yards
- MIN – Aaron Jones – 21 rushes, 64 yards

**Top receivers**

- IND – Josh Downs – 6 receptions, 60 yards
- MIN – Justin Jefferson – 7 receptions, 137 yards

==== Week 10: at Jacksonville Jaguars ====
Week 10: Minnesota Vikings at Jacksonville Jaguars – Game summary

Quarter	1	2	3	4	Total
**Vikings**	3	0	3	6	**12**
Jaguars	7	0	0	0	**7**

at EverBank Stadium, Jacksonville, Florida

- Date: November 10
- Game time: 1:00 p.m. EST/12:00 p.m. CST
- Game weather: 79 °F (26 °C)
- Game attendance: 65,695
- Referee: Adrian Hill (29)
- TV announcers (Fox): Adam Amin, Mark Sanchez and Kristina Pink
- Recap, Game Book

Game information

**First quarter**

- MIN – John Parker Romo 45-yard field goal, 7:56. Vikings 3–0. **Drive: 12 plays, 53 yards, 5:29.**
- JAX – Mac Jones 1-yard run (Cam Little kick), 3:44. Jaguars 7–3. **Drive: 9 plays, 70 yards, 4:12.**

**Second quarter**

- No scoring plays.

**Third quarter**

- MIN – John Parker Romo 33-yard field goal, 1:42. Jaguars 7–6. **Drive: 14 plays, 72 yards, 8:19.**

**Fourth quarter**

- MIN – John Parker Romo 34-yard field goal, 7:14. Vikings 9–7. **Drive: 16 plays, 68 yards, 7:46.**
- MIN – John Parker Romo 29-yard field goal, 4:22. Vikings 12–7. **Drive: 5 plays, 14 yards, 2:13.**

**Top passers**

- MIN – Sam Darnold – 24/38, 241 yards, 3 INT
- JAX – Mac Jones – 14/22, 111 yards, 2 INT

**Top rushers**

- MIN – Aaron Jones – 17 rushes, 88 yards
- JAX – Travis Etienne – 11 rushes, 44 yards

**Top receivers**

- MIN – T. J. Hockenson – 8 receptions, 72 yards
- JAX – Evan Engram – 6 receptions, 40 yards

==== Week 11: at Tennessee Titans ====
Week 11: Minnesota Vikings at Tennessee Titans – Game summary

Quarter	1	2	3	4	Total
**Vikings**	7	9	7	0	**23**
Titans	3	0	7	3	**13**

at Nissan Stadium, Nashville, Tennessee

- Date: November 17
- Game time: 12:00 p.m. CST
- Game weather: Sunny, 66 °F (19 °C)
- Game attendance: 67,686
- Referee: Clete Blakeman (34)
- TV announcers (CBS): Spero Dedes, Adam Archuleta and Aditi Kinkhabwala
- Recap, Game Book

Game information

**First quarter**

- TEN – Nick Folk 30-yard field goal, 4:39. Titans 3–0. **Drive: 11 plays, 44 yards, 5:43.**
- MIN – Jordan Addison 47-yard pass from Sam Darnold (John Parker Romo kick), 3:16. Vikings 7–3. **Drive: 3 plays, 70 yards, 1:23.**

**Second quarter**

- MIN – Sam Darnold 1-yard run (kick failed, hit right upright), 7:40. Vikings 13–3. **Drive: 16 plays, 89 yards, 8:07.**
- MIN – John Parker Romo 40-yard field goal, 1:41. Vikings 16–3. **Drive: 11 plays, 40 yards, 4:27.**

**Third quarter**

- TEN – Nick Westbrook-Ikhine 98-yard pass from Will Levis (Nick Folk kick), 7:00. Vikings 16–10. **Drive: 3 plays, 98 yards, 1:30.**
- MIN – Cam Akers 3-yard pass from Sam Darnold (John Parker Romo kick), 3:15. Vikings 23–10. **Drive: 7 plays, 65 yards, 3:45.**

**Fourth quarter**

- TEN – Nick Folk 43-yard field goal, 14:08. Vikings 23–13. **Drive: 8 plays, 45 yards, 4:07.**

**Top passers**

- MIN – Sam Darnold – 20/32, 246 yards, 2 TD
- TEN – Will Levis – 17/31, 295 yards, TD, INT

**Top rushers**

- MIN – Aaron Jones – 15 rushes, 39 yards
- TEN – Will Levis – 7 rushes, 18 yards

**Top receivers**

- MIN – Justin Jefferson – 6 receptions, 81 yards
- TEN – Nick Westbrook-Ikhine – 2 receptions, 117 yards, TD

==== Week 12: at Chicago Bears ====
Week 12: Minnesota Vikings at Chicago Bears – Game summary

Quarter	1	2	3	4	OT	Total
**Vikings**	0	14	10	3	3	**30**
Bears	7	3	0	17	0	**27**

at Soldier Field, Chicago, Illinois

- Date: November 24
- Game time: 12:00 p.m. CST
- Game weather: Partly sunny, 47 °F (8 °C)
- Game attendance: 57,659
- Referee: Clay Martin (19)
- TV announcers (Fox): Kevin Kugler, Daryl Johnston and Laura Okmin
- Recap, Game Book

Game information

**First quarter**

- CHI – Roschon Johnson 1-yard run (Cairo Santos kick), 0:53. Bears 7–0. **Drive: 7 plays, 79 yards, 4:17.**

**Second quarter**

- MIN – Jordan Addison 2-yard pass from Sam Darnold (John Parker Romo kick), 14:54. Tied 7–7. **Drive: 3 plays, 67 yards, 0:59.**
- MIN – Jalen Nailor 5-yard pass from Sam Darnold (John Parker Romo kick), 6:29. Vikings 14–7. **Drive: 6 plays, 53 yards, 2:57.**
- CHI – Cairo Santos 49-yard field goal, 0:00. Vikings 14–10. **Drive: 10 plays, 49 yards, 3:09.**

**Third quarter**

- MIN – John Parker Romo 40-yard field goal, 12:40. Vikings 17–10. **Drive: 5 plays, 55 yards, 2:20.**
- MIN – Aaron Jones 2-yard run (John Parker Romo kick), 1:22. Vikings 24–10. **Drive: 5 plays, 15 yards, 2:47.**

**Fourth quarter**

- CHI – D. J. Moore 10-yard pass from Caleb Williams (pass failed), 7:22. Vikings 24–16. **Drive: 10 plays, 64 yards, 4:45.**
- MIN – John Parker Romo 26-yard field goal, 1:56. Vikings 27–16. **Drive: 11 plays, 63 yards, 5:26.**
- CHI – Keenan Allen 1-yard pass from Caleb Williams (Caleb Williams–D. J. Moore pass), 0:22. Vikings 27–24. **Drive: 8 plays, 40 yards, 1:34.**
- CHI – Cairo Santos 48-yard field goal, 0:00. Tied 27–27. **Drive: 3 plays, 27 yards, 0:22.**

**Overtime**

- MIN – John Parker Romo 29-yard field goal, 2:10. Vikings 30–27. **Drive: 10 plays, 68 yards, 5:29.**

**Top passers**

- MIN – Sam Darnold – 22/34, 330 yards, 2 TD
- CHI – Caleb Williams – 32/47, 340 yards, 2 TD

**Top rushers**

- MIN – Aaron Jones – 22 rushes, 106 yards, TD
- CHI – Caleb Williams – 6 rushes, 33 yards

**Top receivers**

- MIN – Jordan Addison – 8 receptions, 162 yards, TD
- CHI – D. J. Moore – 7 receptions, 106 yards, TD

==== Week 13: vs. Arizona Cardinals ====
Week 13: Arizona Cardinals at Minnesota Vikings – Game summary

Quarter	1	2	3	4	Total
Cardinals	3	6	10	3	**22**
**Vikings**	3	3	7	10	**23**

at U.S. Bank Stadium, Minneapolis, Minnesota

- Date: December 1
- Game time: 12:00 p.m. CST
- Game weather: None (indoor stadium)
- Game attendance: 66,873
- Referee: Bill Vinovich (52)
- TV announcers (Fox): Joe Davis, Greg Olsen and Pam Oliver
- Recap, Game Book

Game information

**First quarter**

- ARI – Chad Ryland 32-yard field goal, 9:02. Cardinals 3–0. **Drive: 11 plays, 57 yards, 5:58.**
- MIN – John Parker Romo 44-yard field goal, 4:42. Tied 3–3. **Drive: 9 plays, 44 yards, 4:20.**

**Second quarter**

- ARI – Chad Ryland 31-yard field goal, 6:01. Cardinals 6–3. **Drive: 11 plays, 71 yards, 6:09.**
- MIN – John Parker Romo 55-yard field goal, 1:12. Tied 6–6. **Drive: 9 plays, 33 yards, 4:49.**
- ARI – Chad Ryland 24-yard field goal, 0:00. Cardinals 9–6. **Drive: 12 plays, 64 yards, 1:12.**

**Third quarter**

- ARI – Chad Ryland 40-yard field goal, 8:33. Cardinals 12–6. **Drive: 10 plays, 45 yards, 4:55.**
- ARI – Marvin Harrison Jr. 15-yard pass from Kyler Murray (Chad Ryland kick), 4:37. Cardinals 19–6. **Drive: 5 plays, 73 yards, 2:22.**
- MIN – Johnny Mundt 4-yard pass from Sam Darnold (John Parker Romo kick), 1:17. Cardinals 19–13. **Drive: 6 plays, 70 yards, 3:20.**

**Fourth quarter**

- MIN – John Parker Romo 31-yard field goal, 11:08. Cardinals 19–16. **Drive: 9 plays, 55 yards, 3:39.**
- ARI – Chad Ryland 23-yard field goal, 3:20. Cardinals 22–16. **Drive: 16 plays, 66 yards, 7:48.**
- MIN – Aaron Jones 5-yard pass from Sam Darnold (John Parker Romo kick), 1:13. Vikings 23–22. **Drive: 8 plays, 70 yards, 2:07.**

**Top passers**

- ARI – Kyler Murray – 31/45, 260 yards, TD, 2 INT
- MIN – Sam Darnold – 21/31, 235 yards, 2 TD

**Top rushers**

- ARI – James Conner – 17 rushes, 68 yards
- MIN – Aaron Jones – 5 rushes, 22 yards
- MIN – Sam Darnold – 4 rushes, 22 yards
- MIN – Cam Akers – 4 rushes, 22 yards

**Top receivers**

- ARI – Trey McBride – 12 receptions, 96 yards
- MIN – Justin Jefferson – 7 receptions, 99 yards

==== Week 14: vs. Atlanta Falcons ====
Week 14: Atlanta Falcons at Minnesota Vikings – Game summary

Quarter	1	2	3	4	Total
Falcons	7	3	11	0	**21**
**Vikings**	7	7	7	21	**42**

at U.S. Bank Stadium, Minneapolis, Minnesota

- Date: December 8
- Game time: 12:00 p.m. CST
- Game weather: None (indoor stadium)
- Game attendance: 67,008
- Referee: Alex Kemp (55)
- TV announcers (Fox): Joe Davis, Greg Olsen and Pam Oliver
- Recap, Game Book

Game information

**First quarter**

- ATL – Tyler Allgeier 6-yard run (Younghoe Koo kick), 8:58. Falcons 7–0. **Drive: 11 plays, 70 yards, 6:02.**
- MIN – Jordan Addison 49-yard pass from Sam Darnold (Will Reichard kick), 0:37. Tied 7–7. **Drive: 2 plays, 62 yards, 0:51.**

**Second quarter**

- MIN – Justin Jefferson 12-yard pass from Sam Darnold (Will Reichard kick), 2:01. Vikings 14–7. **Drive: 9 plays, 80 yards, 4:16.**
- ATL – Younghoe Koo 20-yard field goal, 0:10. Vikings 14–10. **Drive: 9 plays, 68 yards, 1:51.**

**Third quarter**

- ATL – Younghoe Koo 29-yard field goal, 5:06. Vikings 14–13. **Drive: 11 plays, 52 yards, 4:50.**
- MIN – Justin Jefferson 52-yard pass from Sam Darnold (Will Reichard kick), 3:25. Vikings 21–13. **Drive: 4 plays, 75 yards, 1:41.**
- ATL – Bijan Robinson 13-yard run (Bijan Robinson run), 0:39. Tied 21–21. **Drive: 5 plays, 70 yards, 2:46.**

**Fourth quarter**

- MIN – Jordan Addison 11-yard pass from Sam Darnold (Will Reichard kick), 12:59. Vikings 28–21. **Drive: 6 plays, 70 yards, 2:40.**
- MIN – Jordan Addison 6-yard pass from Sam Darnold (Will Reichard kick), 8:23. Vikings 35–21. **Drive: 7 plays, 32 yards, 4:30.**
- MIN – Aaron Jones 15-yard run (Will Reichard kick), 3:38. Vikings 42–21. **Drive: 7 plays, 98 yards, 2:48.**

**Top passers**

- ATL – Kirk Cousins – 23/37, 344 yards, 2 INT
- MIN – Sam Darnold – 22/28, 347 yards, 5 TD

**Top rushers**

- ATL – Bijan Robinson – 22 rushes, 92 yards, TD
- MIN – Aaron Jones – 13 rushes, 73 yards, TD

**Top receivers**

- ATL – Darnell Mooney – 6 receptions, 142 yards
- MIN – Jordan Addison – 8 receptions, 133 yards, 3 TD

==== Week 15: vs. Chicago Bears ====
Week 15: Chicago Bears at Minnesota Vikings – Game summary

Quarter	1	2	3	4	Total
Bears	0	0	3	9	**12**
**Vikings**	10	3	7	10	**30**

at U.S. Bank Stadium, Minneapolis, Minnesota

- Date: December 16
- Game time: 7:00 p.m. CST
- Game weather: None (indoor stadium)
- Game attendance: 67,017
- Referee: John Hussey (35)
- TV announcers (ABC): Joe Buck, Troy Aikman and Lisa Salters
- Recap, Game Book

Game information

**First quarter**

- MIN – Will Reichard 52-yard field goal, 12:04. Vikings 3–0. **Drive: 4 plays, 5 yards, 0:53.**
- MIN – Justin Jefferson 7-yard pass from Sam Darnold (Will Reichard kick), 5:04. Vikings 10–0. **Drive: 5 plays, 39 yards, 2:30.**

**Second quarter**

- MIN – Will Reichard 31-yard field goal, 0:04. Vikings 13–0. **Drive: 13 plays, 58 yards, 2:31.**

**Third quarter**

- CHI – Cairo Santos 29-yard field goal, 7:02. Vikings 13–3. **Drive: 9 plays, 47 yards, 3:38.**
- MIN – Aaron Jones 1-yard run (Will Reichard kick), 1:38. Vikings 20–3. **Drive: 12 plays, 70 yards, 5:24.**

**Fourth quarter**

- CHI – Cairo Santos 39-yard field goal, 13:00. Vikings 20–6. **Drive: 10 plays, 49 yards, 3:38.**
- MIN – Cam Akers 1-yard run (Will Reichard kick), 10:14. Vikings 27–6. **Drive: 7 plays, 70 yards, 2:46.**
- CHI – Keenan Allen 16-yard pass from Caleb Williams (pass failed), 5:19. Vikings 27–12. **Drive: 6 plays, 27 yards, 0:54.**
- MIN – Will Reichard 46-yard field goal, 1:12. Vikings 30–12. **Drive: 7 plays, 14 yards, 4:07.**

**Top passers**

- CHI – Caleb Williams – 18/31, 191 yards, TD
- MIN – Sam Darnold – 24/40, 231 yards, TD, INT

**Top rushers**

- CHI – D'Andre Swift – 19 rushes, 79 yards
- MIN – Aaron Jones – 18 rushes, 86 yards, TD

**Top receivers**

- CHI – Keenan Allen – 6 receptions, 82 yards, TD
- MIN – Justin Jefferson – 7 receptions, 73 yards, TD

==== Week 16: at Seattle Seahawks ====
Week 16: Minnesota Vikings at Seattle Seahawks – Game summary

Quarter	1	2	3	4	Total
**Vikings**	7	10	3	7	**27**
Seahawks	0	14	3	7	**24**

at Lumen Field, Seattle, Washington

- Date: December 22
- Game time: 3:05 p.m. CST/1:05 p.m. PST
- Game weather: Rain, 48 °F (9 °C)
- Game attendance: 68,748
- Referee: Craig Wrolstad (4)
- TV announcers (Fox): Adam Amin, Mark Sanchez and Kristina Pink
- Recap, Game Book

Game information

**First quarter**

- MIN – Jordan Addison 5-yard pass from Sam Darnold (Will Reichard kick), 8:06. Vikings 7–0. **Drive: 12 plays, 70 yards, 6:54.**

**Second quarter**

- SEA – DK Metcalf 25-yard pass from Geno Smith (Jason Myers kick), 13:35. Tied 7–7. **Drive: 7 plays, 87 yards, 4:03.**
- MIN – Justin Jefferson 14-yard pass from Sam Darnold (Will Reichard kick), 5:50. Vikings 14–7. **Drive: 8 plays, 67 yards, 4:39.**
- MIN – Will Reichard 52-yard field goal, 3:33. Vikings 17–7. **Drive: 4 plays, −3 yards, 2:09.**
- SEA – Jaxon Smith-Njigba 18-yard pass from Geno Smith (Jason Myers kick), 0:20. Vikings 17–14. **Drive: 5 plays, 88 yards, 1:05.**

**Third quarter**

- SEA – Jason Myers 43-yard field goal, 10:37. Tied 17–17. **Drive: 8 plays, 40 yards, 4:23.**
- MIN – Will Reichard 48-yard field goal, 6:25. Vikings 20–17. **Drive: 8 plays, 40 yards, 4:12.**

**Fourth quarter**

- SEA – AJ Barner 4-yard pass from Geno Smith (Jason Myers kick), 4:21. Seahawks 24–20. **Drive: 11 plays, 68 yards, 6:16.**
- MIN – Justin Jefferson 39-yard pass from Sam Darnold (Will Reichard kick), 3:51. Vikings 27–24. **Drive: 4 plays, 70 yards, 0:30.**

**Top passers**

- MIN – Sam Darnold – 22/35, 246 yards, 3 TD
- SEA – Geno Smith – 31/43, 315 yards, 3 TD, 2 INT

**Top rushers**

- MIN – Aaron Jones – 18 rushes, 67 yards
- SEA – Kenneth Walker III – 8 rushes, 31 yards

**Top receivers**

- MIN – Justin Jefferson – 10 receptions, 144 yards, 2 TD
- SEA – Jaxon Smith-Njigba – 8 receptions, 95 yards, TD

==== Week 17: vs. Green Bay Packers ====
Week 17: Green Bay Packers at Minnesota Vikings – Game summary

Quarter	1	2	3	4	Total
Packers	3	0	7	15	**25**
**Vikings**	0	13	14	0	**27**

at U.S. Bank Stadium, Minneapolis, Minnesota

- Date: December 29
- Game time: 3:25 p.m. CST
- Game weather: None (indoor stadium)
- Game attendance: 67,031
- Referee: Carl Cheffers (51)
- TV announcers (Fox): Kevin Burkhardt, Tom Brady, Erin Andrews and Tom Rinaldi
- Recap, Game Book

Game information

**First quarter**

- GB – Brandon McManus 22-yard field goal, 1:47. Packers 3–0. **Drive: 8 plays, 49 yards, 4:15.**

**Second quarter**

- MIN – Jalen Nailor 31-yard pass from Sam Darnold (Will Reichard kick), 11:52. Vikings 7–3. **Drive: 9 plays, 77 yards, 4:55.**
- MIN – Will Reichard 25-yard field goal, 2:16. Vikings 10–3. **Drive: 10 plays, 69 yards, 5:13.**
- MIN – Will Reichard 50-yard field goal, 0:00. Vikings 13–3. **Drive: 6 plays, 52 yards, 1:16.**

**Third quarter**

- MIN – Jordan Addison 18-yard pass from Sam Darnold (Will Reichard kick), 9:44. Vikings 20–3. **Drive: 9 plays, 70 yards, 5:16.**
- GB – Josh Jacobs 2-yard run (Brandon McManus kick), 5:07. Vikings 20–10. **Drive: 4 plays, 16 yards, 1:56.**
- MIN – Cam Akers 9-yard pass from Sam Darnold (Will Reichard kick), 0:51. Vikings 27–10. **Drive: 8 plays, 70 yards, 4:16.**

**Fourth quarter**

- GB – Emanuel Wilson 5-yard run (Jordan Love–Romeo Doubs pass), 6:12. Vikings 27–18. **Drive: 9 plays, 67 yards, 3:06.**
- GB – Malik Heath 3-yard pass from Jordan Love (Brandon McManus kick), 2:18. Vikings 27–25. **Drive: 9 plays, 62 yards, 2:19.**

**Top passers**

- GB – Jordan Love – 19/30, 185 yards, TD
- MIN – Sam Darnold – 33/43, 377 yards, 3 TD, INT

**Top rushers**

- GB – Josh Jacobs – 17 rushes, 69 yards, TD
- MIN – Aaron Jones – 12 rushes, 47 yards

**Top receivers**

- GB – Romeo Doubs – 7 receptions, 58 yards
- MIN – Justin Jefferson – 8 receptions, 92 yards

With the close win, the Vikings swept the Packers for the first time since 2017 and won nine consecutive games in the regular season for the first time since 1975. The Vikings improved to 14–2, their first time winning at least 14 games in the regular season since 1998, when they went 15–1.

==== Week 18: at Detroit Lions ====
Week 18: Minnesota Vikings at Detroit Lions – Game summary

Quarter	1	2	3	4	Total
Vikings	0	6	3	0	**9**
**Lions**	7	3	7	14	**31**

at Ford Field, Detroit, Michigan

- Date: January 5
- Game time: 8:20 p.m. EST/7:20 p.m. CST
- Game weather: None (indoor stadium)
- Game attendance: 64,774
- Referee: Brad Rogers (126)
- TV announcers (NBC/Peacock): Mike Tirico, Cris Collinsworth and Melissa Stark
- Recap, Game Book

Game information

**First quarter**

- DET – Jahmyr Gibbs 25-yard run (Jake Bates kick), 1:43. Lions 7–0. **Drive: 9 plays, 78 yards, 5:18.**

**Second quarter**

- MIN – Will Reichard 25-yard field goal, 6:35. Lions 7–3. **Drive: 4 plays, 0 yards, 0:20.**
- MIN – Will Reichard 31-yard field goal, 0:20. Lions 7–6. **Drive: 9 plays, 45 yards, 3:17.**
- DET – Jake Bates 48-yard field goal, 0:00. Lions 10–6. **Drive: 3 plays, 30 yards, 0:20.**

**Third quarter**

- MIN – Will Reichard 51-yard field goal, 9:55. Lions 10–9. **Drive: 6 plays, 21 yards, 1:55.**
- DET – Jahmyr Gibbs 10-yard pass from Jared Goff (Jake Bates kick), 2:30. Lions 17–9. **Drive: 13 plays, 70 yards, 7:25.**

**Fourth quarter**

- DET – Jahmyr Gibbs 13-yard run (Jake Bates kick), 13:06. Lions 24–9. **Drive: 6 plays, 59 yards, 2:17.**
- DET – Jahmyr Gibbs 4-yard run (Jake Bates kick), 5:14. Lions 31–9. **Drive: 7 plays, 74 yards, 4:59.**

**Top passers**

- MIN – Sam Darnold – 18/41, 166 yards
- DET – Jared Goff – 27/33, 231 yards, TD, 2 INT

**Top rushers**

- MIN – Cam Akers – 6 rushes, 65 yards
- DET – Jahmyr Gibbs – 23 rushes, 139 yards, 3 TD

**Top receivers**

- MIN – Justin Jefferson – 3 receptions, 54 yards
- DET – Amon-Ra St. Brown – 6 receptions, 77 yards

The league flexed this game to Sunday night, as the winner of the game would clinch the #1 seed in the NFC playoffs and a first-round bye, whereas the loser would finish as the #5 seed and visit the Rams the next week. The Vikings were dominated on both sides of the ball, and ended the regular season with a 14–3 record. The team's 14 wins were the most for any wild card team in NFL history. Additionally, they were swept by the Lions for the second consecutive season.

=== Standings ===
==== Division ====
NFC North
	W	L	T	PCT	DIV	CONF	PF	PA	STK
^{(1)} Detroit Lions	15	2	0	.882	6–0	11–1	564	342	W3
^{(5)} Minnesota Vikings	14	3	0	.824	4–2	9–3	432	332	L1
^{(7)} Green Bay Packers	11	6	0	.647	1–5	6–6	460	338	L2
Chicago Bears	5	12	0	.294	1–5	3–9	310	370	W1

==== Conference ====
NFC
Seed	Team	Division	W	L	T	PCT	DIV	CONF	SOS	SOV	STK
**Division leaders**
1	Detroit Lions	North	15	2	0	.882	6–0	11–1	.516	.494	W3
2	Philadelphia Eagles	East	14	3	0	.824	5–1	9–3	.453	.424	W2
3 (Note: Tampa Bay clinched the #3 seed over Los Angeles based on conference record. (Tampa Bay 8–4 to Los Angeles 6–6))	Tampa Bay Buccaneers	South	10	7	0	.588	4–2	8–4	.502	.465	W2
4 (Note: Los Angeles clinched the NFC West and #4 seed over Seattle based on strength of victory. (Los Angeles .441 to Seattle .424))	Los Angeles Rams	West	10	7	0	.588	4–2	6–6	.505	.441	L1
**Wild cards**
5	Minnesota Vikings	North	14	3	0	.824	4–2	9–3	.474	.408	L1
6	Washington Commanders	East	12	5	0	.706	4–2	9–3	.436	.358	W5
7	Green Bay Packers	North	11	6	0	.647	1–5	6–6	.533	.412	L2
**Did not qualify for the postseason**
8	Seattle Seahawks	West	10	7	0	.588	4–2	6–6	.498	.424	W2
9 (Note: Atlanta finished ahead of Arizona based on conference record. (Atlanta 7–5 to Arizona 4–8))	Atlanta Falcons	South	8	9	0	.471	4–2	7–5	.519	.426	L2
10	Arizona Cardinals	West	8	9	0	.471	3–3	4–8	.536	.404	W1
11	Dallas Cowboys	East	7	10	0	.412	3–3	5–7	.522	.387	L2
12	San Francisco 49ers	West	6	11	0	.353	1–5	4–8	.564	.402	L4
13 (Note: Chicago finished ahead of Carolina based on head-to-head victory.)	Chicago Bears	North	5	12	0	.294	1–5	3–9	.554	.388	W1
14 (Note: Carolina finished ahead of New Orleans based on strength of victory. (Carolina .329 to New Orleans .306))	Carolina Panthers	South	5	12	0	.294	2–4	4–8	.498	.329	W1
15	New Orleans Saints	South	5	12	0	.294	2–4	4–8	.505	.306	L4
16	New York Giants	East	3	14	0	.176	0–6	1–11	.554	.412	L1
**Tiebreakers** (Note: When breaking ties for three or more teams under the NFL's rules, they are first broken within divisions, then comparing only the highest ranked remaining team from each division.)

== Postseason ==
=== Schedule ===
Round	Date	Opponent (seed)	Result	Record	Venue	Recap
Wild Card	January 13	at Los Angeles Rams (4)	L 9–27	0–1	State Farm Stadium	Recap

=== Game summaries ===
==== NFC Wild Card Playoffs: at (4) Los Angeles Rams ====
NFC Wild Card playoffs: (5) Minnesota Vikings at (4) Los Angeles Rams – Game summary

Quarter	1	2	3	4	Total
Vikings	0	3	6	0	9
Rams	10	14	3	0	27

at State Farm Stadium, Glendale, Arizona

- Date: January 13, 2025
- Game time: 6:00 p.m. MST/7:00 p.m. CST
- Game weather: None (retractable roof closed)
- Game attendance: 64,515
- Referee: John Hussey (35)
- TV announcers (ESPN/ABC/ESPN2/ESPN+): Joe Buck, Troy Aikman, Lisa Salters and Laura Rutledge
- Recap, Game Book

Game information

First quarter

- LAR – Kyren Williams 5-yard pass from Matthew Stafford (Joshua Karty kick), 10:22. Rams 7–0. Drive: 7 plays, 70 yards, 4:38.
- LAR – Joshua Karty 34-yard field goal, 4:01. Rams 10–0. Drive: 8 plays, 62 yards, 4:09.

Second quarter

- MIN – Will Reichard 34-yard field goal, 14:17. Rams 10–3. Drive: 9 plays, 54 yards, 4:44.
- LAR – Jared Verse 57-yard fumble return (Joshua Karty kick), 4:35. Rams 17–3.
- LAR – Davis Allen 13-yard pass from Matthew Stafford (Joshua Karty kick), 0:15. Rams 24–3. Drive: 5 plays, 39 yards, 1:12.

Third quarter

- LAR – Joshua Karty 44-yard field goal, 7:19. Rams 27–3. Drive: 11 plays, 51 yards, 6:13.
- MIN – T. J. Hockenson 26-yard pass from Sam Darnold (pass failed), 5:05. Rams 27–9. Drive: 6 plays, 62 yards, 2:14.

Fourth quarter

- No scoring plays.

Top passers

- MIN – Sam Darnold – 25/40, 245 yards, TD, INT
- LAR – Matthew Stafford – 19/27, 209 yards, 2 TD

Top rushers

- MIN – Aaron Jones – 13 rushes, 48 yards
- LAR – Kyren Williams – 16 rushes, 76 yards

Top receivers

- MIN – T. J. Hockenson – 5 receptions, 64 yards, TD
- LAR – Tyler Higbee – 5 receptions, 58 yards

Amid the January 2025 Southern California wildfires, on January 9, the NFL moved the game to its alternate venue, State Farm Stadium in Glendale, Arizona, in the interest of public safety.

== Statistics ==
=== Team leaders ===
Category	Player(s)	Total
Passing yards	Sam Darnold	4,319
Passing touchdowns	Sam Darnold	35
Rushing yards	Aaron Jones	1,138
Rushing touchdowns	Aaron Jones	5
Receptions	Justin Jefferson	103
Receiving yards	Justin Jefferson	1,533
Receiving touchdowns	Justin Jefferson	10
Points	Will Reichard	110
Kickoff return yards	Ty Chandler	205
Punt return yards	Brandon Powell	164
Tackles	Blake Cashman	112
Sacks	Jonathan Greenard	12.0
Interceptions	Byron Murphy	6
Forced fumbles	Jonathan Greenard	4

Source: Pro-Football-Reference.com

=== League rankings ===
Category	Total yards	Yards per game	NFL rank (out of 32)
Passing offense	4,043	237.8	6th
Rushing offense	1,855	109.1	19th
Total offense	5,898	346.9	12th
Passing defense	4,114	242.0	28th
Rushing defense	1,588	93.4	2nd
Total defense	5,702	335.4	16th

Source: ProFootballReference.com
