= 2024 Atlanta Falcons season =

59th season in franchise history

- Owner: Arthur Blank
- General manager: Terry Fontenot
- Head coach: Raheem Morris
- Home stadium: Mercedes-Benz Stadium

Results
- Record: 8–9
- Division place: 2nd NFC South
- Playoffs: Did not qualify
- All-Pros: RG Chris Lindstrom (2nd team)
- Pro Bowlers: RB Bijan Robinson; G Chris Lindstrom; ST KhaDarel Hodge

Uniform
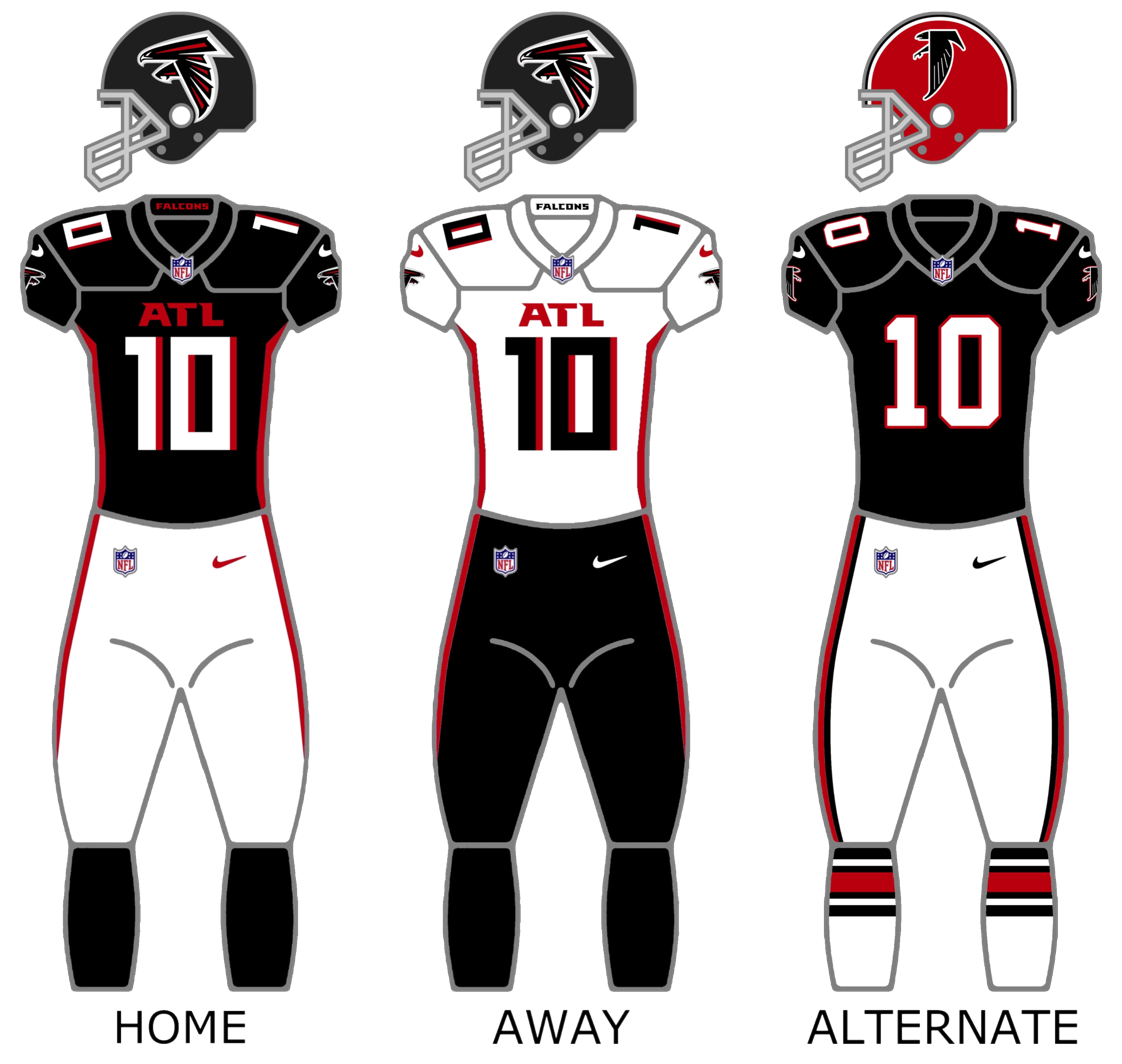

The 2024 season was the Atlanta Falcons' 59th in the National Football League (NFL), their eighth playing their home games at Mercedes-Benz Stadium, their fourth under general manager Terry Fontenot and their first under head coach Raheem Morris. They improved on their 7–10 record from the previous three years, but failed to make the playoffs, extending a six-year absence and their seven-year NFC South title drought. Despite this, their highlights included a sweeping the eventual NFC South champion Tampa Bay Buccaneers and a Week 2 road victory over the eventual Super Bowl LIX champion Philadelphia Eagles.

In a Week 5 Thursday night matchup against the Buccaneers, Kirk Cousins set a franchise record for most passing yards in a game, throwing for 509 yards, beating the record previously set by Matt Ryan in 2016. The Falcons' 6–3 start was also their best since 2016. They then went through a four-game losing streak plagued by turnovers and poor defensive play; the Falcons would subsequently bench Cousins after Week 15 for first-round draft pick Michael Penix Jr. Their Week 16 win over the New York Giants secured their eighth victory of the season, their most since 2017.

The Falcons were eliminated from playoff contention for a seventh consecutive season as regulation time was expiring in their Week 18 game against the Carolina Panthers, due to a Buccaneers win over the Saints. The Panthers subsequently defeated Atlanta in overtime, extending Atlanta's streak of losing seasons to seven years.

== Draft ==
2024 Atlanta Falcons draft selections
Round	Selection	Player	Position	College	Notes
1	8	Michael Penix Jr.	QB	Washington	
2	35	Ruke Orhorhoro	DT	Clemson	From Cardinals (Note: The Falcons traded second- and third-round selections (43rd and 79th overall) to the Arizona Cardinals in exchange for second- and sixth-round selections (35th and 186th overall).)
2	43	Traded to the Arizona Cardinals			
3	74	Bralen Trice	LB	Washington	
3	79	Traded to Arizona Cardinals			From Jaguars (Note: The Falcons traded WR Calvin Ridley to the Jacksonville Jaguars in exchange for a third-round selection (79th overall) and a 2023 fifth-round selection (159th overall).)
4	109	Brandon Dorlus	DT	Oregon	
5	143	JD Bertrand	LB	Notre Dame	
6	186	Jase McClellan	RB	Alabama	From Vikings via Cardinals
6	187	Casey Washington	WR	Illinois	
6	197	Zion Logue	DT	Georgia	From Browns (Note: The Falcons traded a seventh-round selection (230th overall) and LB Deion Jones to the Cleveland Browns in exchange for a sixth-round selection (197th overall).)
7	230	Traded to the Cleveland Browns			

2024 Atlanta Falcons undrafted free agents
Name	Position	College	Ref.
Ryan Coll	OT	Richmond	
JaQuae Jackson	WR	Rutgers	
John Paddock	QB	Illinois	
Nolan Potter	OT	Northern Illinois	
Jayden Price	CB	North Dakota State	
Anthony Sao	CB	MidAmerica Nazarene	
Ryan Sanborn	P	Texas	
Austin Stogner	TE	Oklahoma	
Trey Vaval	CB	Minnesota State	
Isaiah Wooden	WR	Southern Utah	
OJ Hiliare	WR	Bowling Green	

Draft trades

== Staff ==
2024 Atlanta Falcons staff
Front office: Owner/chairman – Arthur Blank; CEO – Rich McKay; President – Greg Beadles; General manager – Terry Fontenot; Assistant general manager – Kyle Smith; Vice president of football operations/player personnel – Ryan Pace; Director of college scouting – Adetokunbo Abanikanda; Assistant director of college scouting – Michael Ross; Director of coaching operations – Brian Griffin; Senior director of football administration – Chris Olsen; Senior personnel executive – Ruston Webster; Head coaches: Head coach – Raheem Morris; Assistant head coach/defense – Jerry Gray; Offensive coaches: Offensive coordinator – Zac Robinson; Quarterbacks – T. J. Yates; Running backs – Michael Pitre; Wide receivers – Ike Hilliard; Tight ends – Kevin Koger; Run game coordinator/offensive line – Dwayne Ledford; Assistant offensive line – Shawn Flaherty; Assistant offensive line – Nick Jones; Senior offensive assistant – Ken Zampese; Offensive assistant – K.J. Black; Offensive assistant – Patrick Kramer; Offensive assistant/assistant quarterbacks – D. J. Williams; Pass game specialist/game management – Tim Berbenich; Pass game specialist – Chandler Whitmer	Defensive coaches: Defensive coordinator – Jimmy Lake; Defensive line – Jay Rodgers; Inside linebackers – Barrett Ruud; Outside linebackers – Jacquies Smith; Secondary – Justin Hood; Senior defensive assistant – Dave Huxtable; Defensive assistant – Lance Schulters; Defensive assistant – John Timu; Special teams coaches: Special teams coordinator – Marquice Williams; Assistant special teams – Steven King; Strength and conditioning: Director of Player Performance – John Griffin; Assistant director of strength & conditioning – Paul Constantine; Assistant director of strength & conditioning – Erik Jernstrom; Assistant director of strength & conditioning – Josh Nelson

== Final roster ==
2024 Atlanta Falcons roster
Quarterbacks (QB): 18 Kirk Cousins; 9 Michael Penix Jr.; Running backs (RB): 25 Tyler Allgeier; 7 Bijan Robinson; 28 Carlos Washington Jr.; 26 Avery Williams; Wide receivers (WR): 19 Chris Blair; 12 KhaDarel Hodge; 5 Drake London; 34 Ray-Ray McCloud; 1 Darnell Mooney; 82 Casey Washington; Tight ends (TE): 85 Ross Dwelley; 8 Kyle Pitts; 89 Charlie Woerner	Offensive linemen (OL): 65 Matthew Bergeron G; 67 Drew Dalman C; 68 Kyle Hinton G; 63 Chris Lindstrom G; 70 Jake Matthews T; 76 Kaleb McGary T; 64 Ryan Neuzil C; 77 Storm Norton T; 75 Brandon Parker T; 71 Elijah Wilkinson T/G; Defensive linemen (DL): 54 Brandon Dorlus DE; 99 Eddie Goldman DE; 96 Zach Harrison DE; 97 Grady Jarrett DE; 90 David Onyemata NT; 98 Ruke Orhorhoro NT; 93 Kentavius Street DE	Linebackers (LB): 40 JD Bertrand ILB; 0 Lorenzo Carter OLB; 17 Arnold Ebiketie OLB; 55 Kaden Elliss ILB; 91 Demone Harris OLB; 15 Matthew Judon OLB; 53 Nate Landman ILB; 51 DeAngelo Malone OLB; 42 Josh Woods ILB; Defensive backs (DB): 20 Dee Alford CB; 3 Jessie Bates FS; 35 Natrone Brooks CB; 27 Richie Grant SS; 21 Mike Hughes CB; 32 Kevin King CB; 22 Clark Phillips III CB; 31 Justin Simmons SS; 24 A. J. Terrell CB; Special teams (ST): 49 Liam McCullough LS; 37 Riley Patterson K; 13 Bradley Pinion P	Practice squad: 72 Junior Aho DE (IPP); 73 Kyler Baugh DE; 16 Phillip Dorsett WR; 41 Elijah Dotson RB; 81 Dylan Drummond WR; 43 Rashaan Evans ILB; 56 Jovaughn Gwyn C; 38 Lamar Jackson CB; 11 Emory Jones QB; 92 Khalid Kareem OLB; 94 LaCale London NT; 86 Jesse Matthews WR; 4 Nathan Peterman QB; 88 Armani Rogers TE; 45 Benny Sapp III FS; 74 Tyrone Wheatley Jr. T; Reserve: 29 Micah Abernathy FS (IR); 44 Troy Andersen ILB (IR); 39 Robert Burns RB (PUP); 95 Ta'Quon Graham DE (IR); 33 Antonio Hamilton CB (IR); 36 Harrison Hand CB (IR); 23 DeMarcco Hellams SS (IR/DFR); 6 Younghoe Koo K (IR); 30 Jase McClellan RB (IR); 14 Rondale Moore WR (IR); 50 James Smith-Williams OLB (IR); 49 Bralen Trice OLB (IR); Rookies in italics 53 active, 12 reserve, 16 practice squad

== Preseason ==
Week	Date	Opponent	Result	Record	Venue	Recap
1	August 9	at Miami Dolphins	L 13–20	0–1	Hard Rock Stadium	Recap
2	August 17	at Baltimore Ravens	L 12–13	0–2	M&T Bank Stadium	Recap
3	August 23	Jacksonville Jaguars	L 0–31	0–3	Mercedes-Benz Stadium	Recap

== Regular season ==
=== Schedule ===
Week	Date	Opponent	Result	Record	Venue	Recap
1	September 8	Pittsburgh Steelers	**L** 10–18	0–1	Mercedes-Benz Stadium	Recap
2	September 16	at Philadelphia Eagles	**W** 22–21	1–1	Lincoln Financial Field	Recap
3	September 22	Kansas City Chiefs	**L** 17–22	1–2	Mercedes-Benz Stadium	Recap
4	September 29	**New Orleans Saints**	**W** 26–24	2–2	Mercedes-Benz Stadium	Recap
5	October 3	**Tampa Bay Buccaneers**	**W** 36–30 (OT)	3–2	Mercedes-Benz Stadium	Recap
6	October 13	at **Carolina Panthers**	**W** 38–20	4–2	Bank of America Stadium	Recap
7	October 20	Seattle Seahawks	**L** 14–34	4–3	Mercedes-Benz Stadium	Recap
8	October 27	at **Tampa Bay Buccaneers**	**W** 31–26	5–3	Raymond James Stadium	Recap
9	November 3	Dallas Cowboys	**W** 27–21	6–3	Mercedes-Benz Stadium	Recap
10	November 10	at **New Orleans Saints**	**L** 17–20	6–4	Caesars Superdome	Recap
11	November 17	at Denver Broncos	**L** 6–38	6–5	Empower Field at Mile High	Recap
12	Bye					
13	December 1	Los Angeles Chargers	**L** 13–17	6–6	Mercedes-Benz Stadium	Recap
14	December 8	at Minnesota Vikings	**L** 21–42	6–7	U.S. Bank Stadium	Recap
15	December 16	at Las Vegas Raiders	**W** 15–9	7–7	Allegiant Stadium	Recap
16	December 22	New York Giants	**W** 34–7	8–7	Mercedes-Benz Stadium	Recap
17	December 29	at Washington Commanders	**L** 24–30 (OT)	8–8	Northwest Stadium	Recap
18	January 5	**Carolina Panthers**	**L** 38–44 (OT)	8–9	Mercedes-Benz Stadium	Recap

Note: Intra-division opponents are in bold text.

=== Game summaries ===
==== Week 1: vs. Pittsburgh Steelers ====
Week 1: Pittsburgh Steelers at Atlanta Falcons – Game summary

Quarter	1	2	3	4	Total
**Steelers**	3	6	6	3	**18**
Falcons	3	7	0	0	**10**

at Mercedes-Benz Stadium, Atlanta, Georgia

- Date: September 8
- Game time: 1:00 p.m. EDT
- Game weather: None (retractable roof closed)
- Game attendance: 72,291
- Referee: Brad Rogers
- TV announcers (Fox): Joe Davis, Greg Olsen and Pam Oliver
- Recap, Game Book

Game information

**First quarter**

- ATL – Younghoe Koo 24-yard field goal, 9:06. Falcons 3–0. **Drive: 12 plays, 64 yards, 5:54.**
- PIT – Chris Boswell 57-yard field goal, 4:37. Tied 3–3. **Drive: 10 plays, 31 yards, 4:29.**

**Second quarter**

- PIT – Chris Boswell 51-yard field goal, 12:54. Steelers 6–3. **Drive: 10 plays, 18 yards, 6:08.**
- ATL – Kyle Pitts 12-yard pass from Kirk Cousins (Younghoe Koo kick), 0:32. Falcons 10–6. **Drive: 9 plays, 90 yards, 3:18.**
- PIT – Chris Boswell 44-yard field goal, 0:00. Falcons 10–9. **Drive: 4 plays, 45 yards, 0:32.**

**Third quarter**

- PIT – Chris Boswell 56-yard field goal, 7:45. Steelers 12–10. **Drive: 9 plays, 24 yards, 2:44.**
- PIT – Chris Boswell 40-yard field goal, 0:25. Steelers 15–10. **Drive: 5 plays, 46 yards, 3:24.**

**Fourth quarter**

- PIT – Chris Boswell 25-yard field goal, 0:28. Steelers 18–10. **Drive: 7 plays, 11 yards, 2:06.**

**Top passers**

- PIT – Justin Fields – 17/23, 156 yards
- ATL – Kirk Cousins – 16/26, 155 yards, TD, 2 INT

**Top rushers**

- PIT – Najee Harris – 20 rushes, 70 yards
- ATL – Bijan Robinson – 18 rushes, 68 yards

**Top receivers**

- PIT – George Pickens – 6 receptions, 85 yards
- ATL – Ray-Ray McCloud – 4 receptions, 52 yards

==== Week 2: at Philadelphia Eagles ====
Week 2: Atlanta Falcons at Philadelphia Eagles – Game summary

Quarter	1	2	3	4	Total
**Falcons**	0	6	9	7	**22**
Eagles	0	7	3	11	**21**

at Lincoln Financial Field, Philadelphia, Pennsylvania

- Date: September 16
- Game time: 8:15 p.m. EDT
- Game weather: Cloudy, 71 °F (22 °C)
- Game attendance: 69,879
- Referee: Craig Wrolstad
- TV announcers (WUPA, WPVI, ESPN): Joe Buck, Troy Aikman and Lisa Salters
  WSB-TV declined the option as the Falcons' local broadcast. WUPA won the bid from the NFL for Atlanta market rights.
- Recap, Game Book

Game information

**First quarter**

- No scoring plays.

**Second quarter**

- ATL – Younghoe Koo 39-yard field goal, 11:22. Falcons 3–0. **Drive: 8 plays, 52 yards, 3:55.**
- PHI – DeVonta Smith 7-yard pass from Jalen Hurts (Jake Elliott kick), 5:15. Eagles 7–3. **Drive: 11 plays, 70 yards, 6:07.**
- ATL – Younghoe Koo 22-yard field goal, 0:06. Eagles 7–6. **Drive: 15 plays, 82 yards, 5:09.**

**Third quarter**

- ATL – Younghoe Koo 34-yard field goal, 10:12. Falcons 9–7. **Drive: 9 plays, 54 yards, 4:48.**
- PHI – Jake Elliott 29-yard field goal, 4:28. Eagles 10–9. **Drive: 11 plays, 59 yards, 5:44.**
- ATL – Darnell Mooney 41-yard pass from Kirk Cousins (pass failed), 1:21. Falcons 15–10. **Drive: 7 plays, 70 yards, 3:07.**

**Fourth quarter**

- PHI – Jalen Hurts 1-yard run (Saquon Barkley run), 6:47. Eagles 18–15. **Drive: 17 plays, 70 yards, 9:34.**
- PHI – Jake Elliott 28-yard field goal, 1:39. Eagles 21–15. **Drive: 11 plays, 29 yards, 3:59.**
- ATL – Drake London 7-yard pass from Kirk Cousins (Younghoe Koo kick), 0:34. Falcons 22–21. **Drive: 6 plays, 70 yards, 1:05.**

**Top passers**

- ATL – Kirk Cousins – 20/29, 241 yards, 2 TD
- PHI – Jalen Hurts – 23/30, 183 yards, TD, INT

**Top rushers**

- ATL – Bijan Robinson – 14 rushes, 97 yards
- PHI – Saquon Barkley – 22 rushes, 95 yards

**Top receivers**

- ATL – Darnell Mooney – 3 receptions, 88 yards, TD
- PHI – DeVonta Smith – 7 receptions, 76 yards, TD

Despite being down 18–15 and not having the ball past the two minute warning, an incomplete pass by the Eagles on 3rd down gave the Falcons the ball back with over a minute and a half down by 6. Kirk Cousins drove down the field to give the Falcons a one-point lead on a late touchdown by Drake London. The Falcons defense then secured the upset when Jessie Bates III intercepted Jalen Hurts, allowing Atlanta to pick up its first win in Philadelphia since the 2012 season. This would be the Eagles only home loss of the season.

==== Week 3: vs. Kansas City Chiefs ====
Week 3: Kansas City Chiefs at Atlanta Falcons – Game summary

Quarter	1	2	3	4	Total
**Chiefs**	0	13	9	0	**22**
Falcons	7	7	0	3	**17**

at Mercedes-Benz Stadium, Atlanta, Georgia

- Date: September 22
- Game time: 8:20 p.m. EDT
- Game weather: Clear, 89 °F (32 °C) (retractable roof open)
- Game attendance: 72,441
- Referee: Tra Blake
- TV announcers (NBC): Mike Tirico, Cris Collinsworth and Melissa Stark
- Recap, Game Book

Game information

**First quarter**

- ATL – Drake London 14-yard pass from Kirk Cousins (Younghoe Koo kick), 11:07. Falcons 7–0. **Drive: 7 plays, 70 yards, 3:53.**

**Second quarter**

- KC – Rashee Rice 13-yard pass from Patrick Mahomes (Harrison Butker kick), 8:45. Tied 7–7. **Drive: 13 plays, 79 yards, 6:15.**
- ATL – Bijan Robinson 1-yard run (Younghoe Koo kick), 6:37. Falcons 14–7. **Drive: 5 plays, 70 yards, 2:08.**
- KC – Harrison Butker 53-yard field goal, 2:43. Falcons 14–10. **Drive: 7 plays, 34 yards, 3:54.**
- KC – Harrison Butker 44-yard field goal, 0:06. Falcons 14–13. **Drive: 4 plays, 8 yards, 0:26.**

**Third quarter**

- KC – Harrison Butker 21-yard field goal, 9:40. Chiefs 16–14. **Drive: 11 plays, 67 yards, 5:20.**
- KC – JuJu Smith-Schuster 13-yard pass from Patrick Mahomes (kick failed, hit right upright), 1:16. Chiefs 22–14. **Drive: 11 plays, 80 yards, 6:04.**

**Fourth quarter**

- ATL – Younghoe Koo 54-yard field goal, 12:52. Chiefs 22–17. **Drive: 10 plays, 49 yards, 3:24.**

**Top passers**

- KC – Patrick Mahomes – 26/39, 217 yards, 2 TD, INT
- ATL – Kirk Cousins – 20/29, 230 yards, TD, INT

**Top rushers**

- KC – Carson Steele – 17 rushes, 72 yards
- ATL – Tyler Allgeier – 7 rushes, 32 yards

**Top receivers**

- KC – Rashee Rice – 12 receptions, 110 yards, TD
- ATL – Drake London – 6 receptions, 67 yards, TD

==== Week 4: vs. New Orleans Saints ====
Week 4: New Orleans Saints at Atlanta Falcons – Game summary

Quarter	1	2	3	4	Total
Saints	7	7	3	7	**24**
**Falcons**	7	10	3	6	**26**

at Mercedes-Benz Stadium, Atlanta, Georgia

- Date: September 29
- Game time: 1:00 p.m. EDT
- Game weather: None (retractable roof closed)
- Game attendance: 72,204
- Referee: John Hussey
- TV announcers (Fox): Kenny Albert, Jonathan Vilma and Megan Olivi
- Recap, Game Book

Game information

**First quarter**

- ATL – KhaDarel Hodge fumble recovery in the end zone (Younghoe Koo kick), 11:13. Falcons 7–0.
- NO – Taysom Hill 2-yard run (Blake Grupe kick), 6:39. Tied 7–7. **Drive: 9 plays, 70 yards, 4:34.**

**Second quarter**

- NO – Taysom Hill 5-yard run (Blake Grupe kick), 13:42. Saints 14–7. **Drive: 11 plays, 53 yards, 6:01.**
- ATL – Younghoe Koo 53-yard field goal, 9:57. Saints 14–10. **Drive: 7 plays, 42 yards, 3:45.**
- ATL – Troy Andersen 47-yard interception return (Younghoe Koo kick), 7:54. Falcons 17–14.

**Third quarter**

- ATL – Younghoe Koo 44-yard field goal, 6:46. Falcons 20–14. **Drive: 10 plays, 64 yards, 3:59.**
- NO – Blake Grupe 43-yard field goal, 1:03. Falcons 20–17. **Drive: 10 plays, 50 yards, 5:43.**

**Fourth quarter**

- ATL – Younghoe Koo 42-yard field goal, 10:09. Falcons 23–17. **Drive: 10 plays, 57 yards, 5:54.**
- NO – Alvin Kamara 1-yard run (Blake Grupe kick), 1:00. Saints 24–23. **Drive: 9 plays, 42 yards, 2:28.**
- ATL – Younghoe Koo 58-yard field goal, 0:02. Falcons 26–24. **Drive: 5 plays, 30 yards, 0:58.**

**Top passers**

- NO – Derek Carr – 28/36, 239 yards, INT
- ATL – Kirk Cousins – 21/35, 238 yards, INT

**Top rushers**

- NO – Alvin Kamara – 19 rushes, 77 yards, TD
- ATL – Tyler Allgeier – 8 rushes, 60 yards

**Top receivers**

- NO – Chris Olave – 8 receptions, 87 yards
- ATL – Drake London – 6 receptions, 64 yards

Younghoe Koo went 4/4 on field goals including a 58-yard field goal, the longest in Mercedes-Benz Stadium history, in a 26–24 divisional win against the New Orleans Saints.

==== Week 5: vs. Tampa Bay Buccaneers ====
Week 5: Tampa Bay Buccaneers at Atlanta Falcons – Game summary

Quarter	1	2	3	4	OT	Total
Buccaneers	10	14	3	3	0	**30**
**Falcons**	7	10	3	10	6	**36**

at Mercedes-Benz Stadium, Atlanta, Georgia

- Date: October 3
- Game time: 8:15 p.m. EDT
- Game weather: None (retractable roof closed)
- Game attendance: 70,016
- Referee: Ronald Torbert
- TV announcers (WAGA, WTVT, Prime Video): Al Michaels, Kirk Herbstreit and Kaylee Hartung
  Game exclusive to WAGA and WTVT through syndication. Out of market on Prime Video.
- Recap, Game Book

Game information

**First quarter**

- ATL – Drake London 18-yard pass from Kirk Cousins (Younghoe Koo kick), 11:54. Falcons 7–0. **Drive: 7 plays, 70 yards, 3:06.**
- TB – Mike Evans 2-yard pass from Baker Mayfield (Chase McLaughlin kick), 7:36. Tied 7–7. **Drive: 9 plays, 63 yards, 4:18.**
- TB – Chase McLaughlin 53-yard field goal, 1:22. Buccaneers 10–7. **Drive: 6 plays, 34 yards, 2:08.**

**Second quarter**

- ATL – Darnell Mooney 24-yard pass from Kirk Cousins (Younghoe Koo kick), 11:58. Falcons 14–10. **Drive: 9 plays, 70 yards, 4:24.**
- TB – Mike Evans 23-yard pass from Baker Mayfield (Chase McLaughlin kick), 10:17. Buccaneers 17–14. **Drive: 3 plays, 44 yards, 1:41.**
- ATL – Younghoe Koo 54-yard field goal, 6:17. Tied 17–17. **Drive: 8 plays, 34 yards, 4:00.**
- TB – Sterling Shepard 4-yard pass from Baker Mayfield (Chase McLaughlin kick), 1:56. Buccaneers 24–17. **Drive: 7 plays, 82 yards, 4:21.**

**Third quarter**

- ATL – Younghoe Koo 48-yard field goal, 6:21. Buccaneers 24–20. **Drive: 12 plays, 50 yards, 5:49.**
- TB – Chase McLaughlin 32-yard field goal, 1:17. Buccaneers 27–20. **Drive: 9 plays, 56 yards, 5:04.**

**Fourth quarter**

- ATL – Darnell Mooney 12-yard pass from Kirk Cousins (Younghoe Koo kick), 13:18. Tied 27–27. **Drive: 8 plays, 70 yards, 2:59.**
- TB – Chase McLaughlin 53-yard field goal, 10:23. Buccaneers 30–27. **Drive: 6 plays, 35 yards, 2:55.**
- ATL – Younghoe Koo 52-yard field goal, 0:02. Tied 30–30. **Drive: 9 plays, 46 yards, 1:14.**

**Overtime**

- ATL – KhaDarel Hodge 45-yard pass from Kirk Cousins, 8:45. Falcons 36–30. **Drive: 4 plays, 70 yards, 1:15.**

**Top passers**

- TB – Baker Mayfield – 19/24, 180 yards, 3 TD
- ATL – Kirk Cousins – 42/58, 509 yards, 4 TD, INT

**Top rushers**

- TB – Rachaad White – 10 rushes, 72 yards
- ATL – Bijan Robinson – 12 rushes, 61 yards

**Top receivers**

- TB – Chris Godwin – 5 receptions, 64 yards
- ATL – Drake London – 12 receptions, 154 yards, TD

==== Week 6: at Carolina Panthers ====
Week 6: Atlanta Falcons at Carolina Panthers – Game summary

Quarter	1	2	3	4	Total
**Falcons**	7	15	6	10	**38**
Panthers	7	10	3	0	**20**

at Bank of America Stadium, Charlotte, North Carolina

- Date: October 13
- Game time: 4:25 p.m. EDT
- Game weather: Sunny, 79 °F (26 °C)
- Game attendance: 70,884
- Referee: Clay Martin
- TV announcers (Fox): Chris Myers, Mark Sanchez and Kristina Pink
- Recap, Game Book

Game information

**First quarter**

- CAR – Diontae Johnson 10-yard pass from Andy Dalton (Eddy Piñeiro kick), 5:56. Panthers 7–0. **Drive: 12 plays, 67 yards, 6:33.**
- ATL – Bijan Robinson 5-yard run (Younghoe Koo kick), 0:38. Tied 7–7. **Drive: 12 plays, 70 yards, 5:18.**

**Second quarter**

- CAR – Eddy Piñeiro 24-yard field goal, 8:48. Panthers 10–7. **Drive: 8 plays, 36 yards, 3:21.**
- ATL – Bijan Robinson 7-yard run (Tyler Allgeier run), 6:03. Falcons 15–10. **Drive: 5 plays, 76 yards, 2:45.**
- ATL – Drake London 3-yard pass from Kirk Cousins (Younghoe Koo kick), 1:42. Falcons 22–10. **Drive: 5 plays, 27 yards, 1:17.**
- CAR – Xavier Legette 7-yard pass from Andy Dalton (Eddy Piñeiero kick), 0:07. Falcons 22–17. **Drive: 8 plays, 76 yards, 1:35.**

Third quarter'

- ATL – Younghoe Koo 21-yard field goal, 10:04. Falcons 25–17. **Drive: 11 plays, 67 yards, 4:56.**
- CAR – Eddy Piñeiro 40-yard field goal, 4:51. Falcons 25–20. **Drive: 11 plays, 48 yards, 5:13.**
- ATL – Younghoe Koo 37-yard field goal, 0:07. Falcons 28–20. **Drive: 10 plays, 57 yards, 4:44.**

**Fourth quarter**

- ATL – Tyler Allgeier 2-yard run (Younghoe Koo kick), 5:38. Falcons 35–20. **Drive: 9 plays, 84 yards, 5:09.**
- ATL – Younghoe Koo 35-yard field goal, 2:11. Falcons 38–20. **Drive: 6 plays, 19 yards, 1:58.**

**Top passers**

- ATL – Kirk Cousins – 19/30, 225 yards, TD
- CAR – Andy Dalton – 26/38, 221 yards, 2 TD, 2 INT

**Top rushers**

- ATL – Tyler Allgeier – 18 rushes, 105 yards, TD
- CAR – Chuba Hubbard – 18 rushes, 92 yards

**Top receivers**

- ATL – Drake London – 6 receptions, 74 yards, TD
- CAR – Diontae Johnson – 6 receptions, 78 yards, TD

==== Week 7: vs. Seattle Seahawks ====
Week 7: Seattle Seahawks at Atlanta Falcons – Game summary

Quarter	1	2	3	4	Total
**Seahawks**	3	14	7	10	**34**
Falcons	0	7	7	0	**14**

at Mercedes-Benz Stadium, Atlanta, Georgia

- Date: October 20
- Game time: 1:00 p.m. EDT
- Game weather: Sunny, 72 °F (22 °C) (retractable roof open)
- Game attendance: 70,691
- Referee: Bill Vinovich
- TV announcers (Fox): Kenny Albert, Jonathan Vilma and Megan Olivi
- Recap, Game Book

Game information

**First quarter**

- SEA – Jason Myers 38-yard field goal, 10:05. Seahawks 3–0. **Drive: 11 plays, 56 yards, 4:55.**

**Second quarter**

- SEA – Kenneth Walker III 20-yard run (Jason Myers kick), 9:52. Seahawks 10–0. **Drive: 5 plays, 56 yards, 2:51.**
- ATL – Bijan Robinson 5-yard run (Younghoe Koo kick), 5:18. Seahawks 10–7. **Drive: 9 plays, 70 yards, 4:34.**
- SEA – DK Metcalf 31-yard pass Geno Smith (Jason Myers kick), 0:04. Seahawks 17–7. **Drive: 6 plays, 68 yards, 1:03.**

**Third quarter**

- ATL – Drake London 5-yard pass from Kirk Cousins (Younghoe Koo kick), 7:43. Seahawks 17–14. **Drive: 14 plays, 79 yards, 7:17.**
- SEA – Kenneth Walker III 17-yard pass from Geno Smith (Jason Myers kick), 3:18. Seahawks 24–14. **Drive: 9 plays, 63 yards, 4:25.**

**Fourth quarter**

- SEA – Derick Hall 64-yard fumble return (Jason Myers kick), 12:46. Seahawks 31–14. **Drive: 7 plays, 29 yards, 2:24.**
- SEA – Jason Myers 59-yard field goal, 7:10. Seahawks 34–14. **Drive: 7 plays, 19 yards, 3:45.**

**Top passers**

- SEA – Geno Smith – 18/28, 207 yards, 2 TD
- ATL – Kirk Cousins – 24/35, 232 yards, TD, 2 INT

**Top rushers**

- SEA – Kenneth Walker III – 14 rushes, 69 yards, TD
- ATL – Bijan Robinson – 21 rushes, 103 yards, TD

**Top receivers**

- SEA – DK Metcalf – 4 receptions, 99 yards, TD
- ATL – Kyle Pitts – 7 receptions, 65 yards

==== Week 8: at Tampa Bay Buccaneers ====
Week 8: Atlanta Falcons at Tampa Bay Buccaneers – Game summary

Quarter	1	2	3	4	Total
**Falcons**	7	17	7	0	**31**
Buccaneers	7	10	0	9	**26**

at Raymond James Stadium, Tampa, Florida

- Date: October 27
- Game time: 1:00 p.m. EDT
- Game weather: Cloudy, 79 °F (26 °C)
- Game attendance: 62,787
- Referee: Shawn Hochuli
- TV announcers (Fox): Adam Amin, Greg Olsen and Pam Oliver
- Recap, Game Book

Game information

**First quarter**

- ATL – Kyle Pitts 36-yard pass from Kirk Cousins (Younghoe Koo kick), 12:52. Falcons 7–0. **Drive: 4 plays, 43 yards, 1:19.**
- TB – Cade Otton 5-yard pass from Baker Mayfield (Chase McLaughlin kick), 4:22. Tied 7–7. **Drive: 15 plays, 70 yards, 8:30.**

**Second quarter**

- TB – Rachaad White 18-yard pass from Baker Mayfield (Chase McLaughlin kick), 10:28. Buccaneers 14–7. **Drive: 12 plays, 97 yards, 7:09.**
- ATL – Kyle Pitts 49-yard pass from Kirk Cousins (Younghoe Koo kick), 7:19. Tied 14–14. **Drive: 7 plays, 70 yards, 3:09.**
- ATL – Darnell Mooney 30-yard pass from Kirk Cousins (Younghoe Koo kick), 2:09. Falcons 21–14. **Drive: 6 plays, 61 yards, 3:19.**
- TB – Chase McLaughlin 52-yard field goal, 1:04. Falcons 21–17. **Drive: 7 plays, 36 yards, 1:05.**
- ATL – Younghoe Koo 39-yard field goal, 0:01. Falcons 24–17. **Drive: 8 plays, 49 yards, 1:03.**

**Third quarter**

- ATL – Bijan Robinson 6-yard pass from Kirk Cousins (Younghoe Koo kick), 0:14. Falcons 31–17. **Drive: 6 plays, 36 yards, 2:51.**

**Fourth quarter**

- TB – Kirk Cousins fumble out of bounds in end zone for safety, 12:04. Falcons 31–19.
- TB – Cade Otton 4-yard pass from Baker Mayfield (Chase McLaughlin kick), 6:52. Falcons 31–26. **Drive: 12 plays, 73 yards, 5:12.**

**Top passers**

- ATL – Kirk Cousins – 23/29, 276 yards, 4 TD
- TB – Baker Mayfield – 37/50, 330 yards, 3 TD, 2 INT

**Top rushers**

- ATL – Bijan Robinson – 13 rushes, 63 yards
- TB – Bucky Irving – 9 rushes, 44 yards

**Top receivers**

- ATL – Bijan Robinson – 6 receptions, 37 yards, TD
- TB – Cade Otton – 9 receptions, 81 yards, 2 TD

==== Week 9: vs. Dallas Cowboys ====
Week 9: Dallas Cowboys at Atlanta Falcons – Game summary

Quarter	1	2	3	4	Total
Cowboys	3	7	3	8	**21**
**Falcons**	7	7	7	6	**27**

at Mercedes-Benz Stadium, Atlanta, Georgia

- Date: November 3
- Game time: 1:00 p.m. EST
- Game weather: None (retractable roof closed)
- Game attendance: 72,665
- Referee: Scott Novak
- TV announcers (Fox): Adam Amin, Greg Olsen and Pam Oliver
- Recap, Game Book

Game information

**First quarter**

- DAL – Brandon Aubrey 34-yard field goal, 9:32. Cowboys 3–0. **Drive: 7 plays, 59 yards, 3:32.**
- ATL – Drake London 9-yard pass from Kirk Cousins (Younghoe Koo kick), 5:23. Falcons 7–3. **Drive: 7 plays, 78 yards, 4:09.**

**Second quarter**

- ATL – Darnell Mooney 36-yard pass from Kirk Cousins (Younghoe Koo kick), 8:28. Falcons 14–3. **Drive: 5 plays, 53 yards, 2:50.**
- DAL – Rico Dowdle 3-yard pass from Dak Prescott (Brandon Aubrey kick), 4:01. Falcons 14–10. **Drive: 9 plays, 70 yards, 4:27.**

**Third quarter**

- ATL – Ray-Ray McCloud 11-yard pass from Kirk Cousins (Younghoe Koo kick), 10:23. Falcons 21–10. **Drive: 5 plays, 38 yards, 2:47.**
- DAL – Brandon Aubrey 57-yard field goal, 0:00. Falcons 21–13. **Drive: 9 plays, 22 yards, 4:11.**

**Fourth quarter**

- ATL – Tyler Allgeier 6-yard run (pass failed), 11:08. Falcons 27–13. **Drive: 7 plays, 66 yards, 3:52.**
- DAL – Jalen Tolbert 4-yard pass from Cooper Rush (Cooper Rush–CeeDee Lamb pass), 1:28. Falcons 27–21. **Drive: 14 plays, 86 yards, 3:28.**

**Top passers**

- DAL – Dak Prescott – 18/24, 133 yards, TD
- ATL – Kirk Cousins – 19/24, 222 yards, 3 TD

**Top rushers**

- DAL – Rico Dowdle – 12 rushes, 75 yards
- ATL – Bijan Robinson – 19 rushes, 86 yards

**Top receivers**

- DAL – Jake Ferguson – 7 receptions, 71 yards
- ATL – Darnell Mooney – 5 receptions, 88 yards, TD

==== Week 10: at New Orleans Saints ====
Week 10: Atlanta Falcons at New Orleans Saints – Game summary

Quarter	1	2	3	4	Total
Falcons	0	7	10	0	**17**
**Saints**	0	17	3	0	**20**

at Caesars Superdome, New Orleans, Louisiana

- Date: November 10
- Game time: 1:00 p.m. EST/12:00 p.m. CST
- Game weather: None (indoor stadium)
- Game attendance: 70,005
- Referee: Carl Cheffers
- TV announcers (Fox): Joe Davis, Greg Olsen and Pam Oliver
- Recap, Game Book

Game information

**First quarter**

- No scoring plays.

**Second quarter**

- NO – Blake Grupe 38-yard field goal, 14:50. Saints 3–0. **Drive: 11 plays, 36 yards, 5:43.**
- NO – Marquez Valdes-Scantling 40-yard pass from Derek Carr (Blake Grupe kick), 10:48. Saints 10–0. **Drive: 4 plays, 57 yards, 1:18.**
- ATL – Bijan Robinson 1-yard run (Younghoe Koo kick), 5:45. Saints 10–7. **Drive: 9 plays, 73 yards, 5:03.**
- NO – Marquez Valdes-Scantling 2-yard pass from Derek Carr (Blake Grupe kick), 3:47. Saints 17–7. **Drive: 4 plays, 70 yards, 1:58.**

**Third quarter**

- ATL – Younghoe Koo 27-yard field goal, 5:42. Saints 17–10. **Drive: 13 plays, 68 yards, 7:58.**
- NO – Blake Grupe 26-yard field goal, 2:44. Saints 20–10. **Drive: 6 plays, 61 yards, 2:58.**
- ATL – Bijan Robinson 37-yard run (Younghoe Koo kick), 1:01. Saints 20–17. **Drive: 4 plays, 63 yards, 1:43.**

**Fourth quarter**

- No scoring plays.

**Top passers**

- ATL – Kirk Cousins – 23/38, 306 yards, INT
- NO – Derek Carr – 16/25, 269 yards, 2 TD

**Top rushers**

- ATL – Bijan Robinson – 20 rushes, 116 yards, 2 TD
- NO – Alvin Kamara – 17 rushes, 55 yards

**Top receivers**

- ATL – Drake London – 8 receptions, 97 yards
- NO – Marquez Valdes-Scantling – 3 receptions, 109 yards, 2 TD

==== Week 11: at Denver Broncos ====
Week 11: Atlanta Falcons at Denver Broncos – Game summary

Quarter	1	2	3	4	Total
Falcons	3	3	0	0	**6**
**Broncos**	7	14	7	10	**38**

at Empower Field at Mile High, Denver, Colorado

- Date: November 17
- Game time: 4:05 p.m. EST/2:05 p.m. MST
- Game weather: Sunny, 55 °F (13 °C)
- Game attendance: 76,545
- Referee: Alan Eck
- TV announcers (Fox): Kevin Kugler, Daryl Johnston and Laura Okmin
- Recap, Game Book

Game information

**First quarter**

- DEN – Nate Adkins 12-yard pass from Bo Nix (Wil Lutz kick), 10:31. Broncos 7–0. **Drive: 9 plays, 70 yards, 4:29.**
- ATL – Younghoe Koo 41-yard field goal, 1:33. Broncos 7–3. **Drive: 13 plays, 48 yards, 8:58.**

**Second quarter**

- DEN – Javonte Williams 14-yard run (Wil Lutz kick), 6:16. Broncos 14–3. **Drive: 9 plays, 77 yards, 6:07.**
- ATL – Younghoe Koo 51-yard field goal, 2:48. Broncos 14–6. **Drive: 8 plays, 38 yards, 3:28.**
- DEN – Marvin Mims 12-yard pass from Bo Nix (Wil Lutz kick), 0:25. Broncos 21–6. **Drive: 10 plays, 70 yards, 2:23.**

**Third quarter**

- DEN – Troy Franklin 7-yard pass from Bo Nix (Wil Lutz kick), 9:05. Broncos 28–6. **Drive: 10 plays, 45 yards, 4:33.**

**Fourth quarter**

- DEN – Wil Lutz 45-yard field goal, 13:08. Broncos 31–6. **Drive: 8 plays, 41 yards, 4:37.**
- DEN – Lil'Jordan Humphrey 41-yard pass from Bo Nix (Wil Lutz kick), 9:03. Broncos 38–6. **Drive: 4 plays, 59 yards, 2:12.**

**Top passers**

- ATL – Kirk Cousins – 18/27, 173 yards, INT
- DEN – Bo Nix – 28/33, 307 yards, 4 TD

**Top rushers**

- ATL – Bijan Robinson – 12 rushes, 35 yards
- DEN – Javonte Williams – 9 rushes, 59 yards, TD

**Top receivers**

- ATL – Drake London – 3 receptions, 61 yards
- DEN – Courtland Sutton – 7 receptions, 78 yards

==== Week 13: vs. Los Angeles Chargers ====
Week 13: Los Angeles Chargers at Atlanta Falcons – Game summary

Quarter	1	2	3	4	Total
**Chargers**	3	6	8	0	**17**
Falcons	7	0	6	0	**13**

at Mercedes-Benz Stadium, Atlanta, Georgia

- Date: December 1
- Game time: 1:00 p.m. EST
- Game weather: None (retractable roof closed)
- Game attendance: 72,139
- Referee: Clete Blakeman
- TV announcers (CBS): Kevin Harlan, Trent Green and Melanie Collins
- Recap, Game Book

Game information

**First quarter**

- ATL – Bijan Robinson 2-yard run (Younghoe Koo kick), 3:59. Falcons 7–0. **Drive: 5 plays, 29 yards, 3:01.**
- LAC – Cameron Dicker 45-yard field goal, 1:39. Falcons 7–3. **Drive: 5 plays, 43 yards, 2:20.**

**Second quarter**

- LAC – Cameron Dicker 51-yard field goal, 11:08. Falcons 7–6. **Drive: 7 plays, 33 yards, 3:44.**
- LAC – Cameron Dicker 34-yard field goal, 0:58. Chargers 9–7. **Drive: 16 plays, 63 yards, 7:55.**

**Third quarter**

- ATL – Younghoe Koo 41-yard field goal, 7:23. Falcons 10–9. **Drive: 11 plays, 66 yards, 5:58.**
- LAC – Tarheeb Still 61-yard interception return (Justin Herbert–Joshua Palmer pass), 1:39. Chargers 17–10.
- ATL – Younghoe Koo 26-yard field goal, 0:03. Chargers 17–13. **Drive: 6 plays, 62 yards, 1:36.**

**Fourth quarter**

- No scoring plays.

**Top passers**

- LAC – Justin Herbert – 16/23, 147 yards
- ATL – Kirk Cousins – 24/39, 245 yards, 4 INT

**Top rushers**

- LAC – Gus Edwards – 6 rushes, 32 yards
- ATL – Bijan Robinson – 26 rushes, 102 yards, TD

**Top receivers**

- LAC – Ladd McConkey – 9 receptions, 117 yards
- ATL – Ray-Ray McCloud – 4 receptions, 95 yards

==== Week 14: at Minnesota Vikings ====
Week 14: Atlanta Falcons at Minnesota Vikings – Game summary

Quarter	1	2	3	4	Total
Falcons	7	3	11	0	**21**
**Vikings**	7	7	7	21	**42**

at U.S. Bank Stadium, Minneapolis, Minnesota

- Date: December 8
- Game time: 1:00 p.m. EST/12:00 p.m. CST
- Game weather: None (indoor stadium)
- Game attendance: 67,008
- Referee: Alex Kemp
- TV announcers (Fox): Joe Davis, Greg Olsen and Pam Oliver
- Recap, Game Book

Game information

**First quarter**

- ATL – Tyler Allgeier 6-yard run (Younghoe Koo kick), 8:58. Falcons 7–0. **Drive: 11 plays, 70 yards, 6:02.**
- MIN – Jordan Addison 49-yard pass from Sam Darnold (Will Reichard kick), 0:37. Tied 7–7. **Drive: 2 plays, 62 yards, 0:51.**

**Second quarter**

- MIN – Justin Jefferson 12-yard pass from Sam Darnold (Will Reichard kick), 2:01. Vikings 14–7. **Drive: 9 plays, 80 yards, 4:16.**
- ATL – Younghoe Koo 20-yard field goal, 0:10. Vikings 14–10. **Drive: 9 plays, 68 yards, 1:51.**

**Third quarter**

- ATL – Younghoe Koo 29-yard field goal, 5:06. Vikings 14–13. **Drive: 11 plays, 52 yards, 4:50.**
- MIN – Justin Jefferson 52-yard pass from Sam Darnold (Will Reichard kick), 3:25. Vikings 21–13. **Drive: 4 plays, 75 yards, 1:41.**
- ATL – Bijan Robinson 13-yard run (Bijan Robinson run), 0:39. Tied 21–21. **Drive: 5 plays, 70 yards, 2:46.**

**Fourth quarter**

- MIN – Jordan Addison 11-yard pass from Sam Darnold (Will Reichard kick), 12:59. Vikings 28–21. **Drive: 6 plays, 70 yards, 2:40.**
- MIN – Jordan Addison 6-yard pass from Sam Darnold (Will Reichard kick), 8:23. Vikings 35–21. **Drive: 7 plays, 32 yards, 4:30.**
- MIN – Aaron Jones 15-yard run (Will Reichard kick), 3:38. Vikings 42–21. **Drive: 7 plays, 98 yards, 2:48.**

**Top passers**

- ATL – Kirk Cousins – 23/37, 344 yards, 2 INT
- MIN – Sam Darnold – 22/28, 347 yards, 5 TD

**Top rushers**

- ATL – Bijan Robinson – 22 rushes, 92 yards, TD
- MIN – Aaron Jones – 13 rushes, 73 yards, TD

**Top receivers**

- ATL – Darnell Mooney – 6 receptions, 142 yards
- MIN – Jordan Addison – 8 receptions, 133 yards, 3 TD

In addition to suffering their fourth straight loss, the Falcons fell out of the NFC South lead for the first time since Week 4 after the Buccaneers defeated the Raiders the same day.

==== Week 15: at Las Vegas Raiders ====
Week 15: Atlanta Falcons at Las Vegas Raiders – Game summary

Quarter	1	2	3	4	Total
**Falcons**	7	2	3	3	**15**
Raiders	0	3	0	6	**9**

at Allegiant Stadium, Paradise, Nevada

- Date: December 16
- Game time: 8:30 p.m. EST/5:30 p.m. PST
- Game weather: None (indoor stadium)
- Game attendance: 62,364
- Referee: Shawn Smith
- TV announcers (WUPA, KVVU, ESPN): Chris Fowler, Dan Orlovsky, Louis Riddick, and Laura Rutledge
  Game exclusive to WUPA and KVVU. Out of market, game broadcast on ESPN, which is blacked out in Atlanta and Las Vegas because of syndication exclusivity policies.
- Recap, Game Book

Game information

**First quarter**

- ATL – Drake London 30-yard pass from Kirk Cousins (Younghoe Koo kick), 0:14. Falcons 7–0. **Drive: 6 plays, 51 yards, 3:30.**

**Second quarter**

- LV – Daniel Carlson 52-yard field goal, 11:44. Falcons 7–3. **Drive: 9 plays, 37 yards, 3:30.**
- ATL – Alexander Mattison loss of 1 yard for a safety, 5:35. Falcons 9–3.

**Third quarter**

- ATL – Younghoe Koo 40-yard field goal, 9:25. Falcons 12–3. **Drive: 6 plays, 15 yards, 2:48.**

**Fourth quarter**

- ATL – Younghoe Koo 48-yard field goal, 13:26. Falcons 15–3. **Drive: 7 plays, 18 yards, 3:34.**
- LV – Ameer Abdullah 5-yard pass from Desmond Ridder (kick blocked), 2:54. Falcons 15–9. **Drive: 9 plays, 68 yards, 2:33.**

**Top passers**

- ATL – Kirk Cousins – 11/17, 112 yards, TD, INT
- LV – Desmond Ridder – 23/39, 208 yards, TD, 2 INT

**Top rushers**

- ATL – Bijan Robinson – 22 rushes, 125 yards
- LV – Desmond Ridder – 5 rushes, 28 yards

**Top receivers**

- ATL – Drake London – 3 receptions, 53 yards, TD
- LV – Jakobi Meyers – 5 receptions, 59 yards

The next day, the Falcons benched Kirk Cousins for rookie Michael Penix Jr.

==== Week 16: vs. New York Giants ====
Week 16: New York Giants at Atlanta Falcons – Game summary

Quarter	1	2	3	4	Total
Giants	0	7	0	0	**7**
**Falcons**	0	17	14	3	**34**

at Mercedes-Benz Stadium, Atlanta, Georgia

- Date: December 22
- Game time: 1:00 p.m. EST
- Game weather: None (retractable roof closed)
- Game attendance: 70,404
- Referee: Tra Blake
- TV announcers (Fox): Kevin Kugler, Daryl Johnston and Laura Okmin
- Recap, Game Book

Game information

**First quarter**

- No scoring plays.

**Second quarter**

- NYG – Tyrone Tracy Jr. 2-yard pass from Drew Lock (Graham Gano kick), 14:53. Giants 7–0. **Drive: 14 plays, 70 yards, 8:12.**
- ATL – Riley Patterson 52-yard field goal, 10:36. Giants 7–3. **Drive: 8 plays, 36 yards, 4:17.**
- ATL – Jessie Bates 55-yard interception return (Riley Patterson kick), 7:56. Falcons 10–7.
- ATL – Bijan Robinson 4-yard run (Riley Patterson kick), 1:43. Falcons 17–7. **Drive: 9 plays, 86 yards, 3:26.**

**Third quarter**

- ATL – Matthew Judon 27-yard interception return (Riley Patterson kick), 14:20. Falcons 24–7.
- ATL – Bijan Robinson 2-yard run (Riley Patterson kick), 7:14. Falcons 31–7. **Drive: 12 plays, 69 yards, 6:17.**

**Fourth quarter**

- ATL – Riley Patterson 37-yard field goal, 10:47. Falcons 34–7. **Drive: 15 plays, 69 yards, 10:04.**

**Top passers**

- NYG – Drew Lock – 22/39, 210 yards, TD, 2 INT
- ATL – Michael Penix Jr. – 18/27, 202 yards, INT

**Top rushers**

- NYG – Tyrone Tracy Jr. – 7 rushes, 26 yards
- ATL – Bijan Robinson – 22 rushes, 94 yards, 2 TD

**Top receivers**

- NYG – Malik Nabers – 7 receptions, 68 yards
- ATL – Darnell Mooney – 5 receptions, 82 yards

With the win, the Falcons improved to 8–7 and, with the Buccaneers' loss later that day to the Cowboys, regained first place in the NFC South.

==== Week 17: at Washington Commanders ====
Week 17: Atlanta Falcons at Washington Commanders – Game summary

Quarter	1	2	3	4	OT	Total
Falcons	7	10	0	7	0	**24**
**Commanders**	7	0	7	10	6	**30**

at Northwest Stadium, Landover, Maryland

- Date: December 29
- Game time: 8:20 p.m. EST
- Game weather: Cloudy, 58 °F (14 °C)
- Game attendance: 63,480
- Referee: Alex Kemp
- TV announcers (NBC): Mike Tirico, Cris Collinsworth and Melissa Stark
- Recap, Game Book

Game information

**First quarter**

- WAS – Olamide Zaccheaus 7-yard pass from Jayden Daniels (Zane Gonzalez kick), 9:33. Commanders 7–0. **Drive: 7 plays, 38 yards, 3:12.**
- ATL – Bijan Robinson 1-yard run (Riley Patterson kick), 5:10. Tied 7–7. **Drive: 10 plays, 70 yards, 4:23.**

**Second quarter**

- ATL – Bijan Robinson 1-yard run (Riley Patterson kick), 4:24. Falcons 14–7. **Drive: 11 plays, 72 yards, 6:13.**
- ATL – Riley Patterson 39-yard field goal, 0:02. Falcons 17–7. **Drive: 8 plays, 51 yards, 1:51.**

**Third quarter**

- WAS – Zach Ertz 10-yard pass from Jayden Daniels (Zane Gonzalez kick), 7:13. Falcons 17–14. **Drive: 15 plays, 69 yards, 7:47.**

**Fourth quarter**

- WAS – Chris Rodriguez Jr. 2-yard run (Zane Gonzalez kick), 13:03. Commanders 21–17. **Drive: 14 plays, 70 yards, 7:03.**
- WAS – Zane Gonzalez 31-yard field goal, 4:32. Commanders 24–17. **Drive: 10 plays, 52 yards, 5:30.**
- ATL – Kyle Pitts 13-yard pass from Michael Penix Jr. (Riley Patterson kick), 1:19. Tied 24–24. **Drive: 12 plays, 68 yards, 3:13.**

**Overtime**

- WAS – Zach Ertz 2-yard pass from Jayden Daniels, 2:42. Commanders 30–24. **Drive: 12 plays, 68 yards, 3:13.**

**Top passers**

- ATL – Michael Penix Jr. – 19/35, 223 yards, TD, INT
- WAS – Jayden Daniels – 24/36, 227 yards, 3 TD, INT

**Top rushers**

- ATL – Bijan Robinson – 17 rushes, 90 yards, 2 TD
- WAS – Jayden Daniels – 16 rushes, 127 yards

**Top receivers**

- ATL – Drake London – 7 receptions, 106 yards
- WAS – Olamide Zaccheaus – 8 receptions, 85 yards, TD

With the loss, the Falcons fell to 8–8, and combined with the Buccaneers' win over the Panthers earlier in the day, caused Atlanta to fall behind once again in the NFC South race. In addition, the Falcons failed to sweep the NFC East following the loss.

==== Week 18: vs. Carolina Panthers ====
Week 18: Carolina Panthers at Atlanta Falcons – Game summary

Quarter	1	2	3	4	OT	Total
**Panthers**	3	14	14	7	6	**44**
Falcons	3	21	0	14	0	**38**

at Mercedes-Benz Stadium, Atlanta, Georgia

- Date: January 5
- Game time: 1:00 p.m. EST
- Game weather: None (retractable roof closed)
- Game attendance: 69,581
- Referee: Land Clark
- TV announcers (CBS): Ian Eagle, Charles Davis and Evan Washburn
- Recap, Game Book

Game information

**First quarter**

- ATL – Riley Patterson 31-yard field goal, 11:08. Falcons 3–0. **Drive: 12 plays, 58 yards, 3:52.**
- CAR – Eddy Piñeiro 35-yard field goal, 7:03. Tied 3–3. **Drive: 8 plays, 53 yards, 4:05.**

**Second quarter**

- CAR – Bryce Young 2-yard run (Eddy Piñeiro kick), 10:47. Panthers 10–3. **Drive: 11 plays, 58 yards, 5:16.**
- ATL – Michael Penix Jr. 5-yard run (Riley Patterson kick), 5:27. Tied 10–10. **Drive: 10 plays, 70 yards, 5:20.**
- CAR – Miles Sanders 33-yard pass from Bryce Young (Eddy Piñeiro kick), 2:48. Panthers 17–10. **Drive: 5 plays, 75 yards, 2:39.**
- ATL – Bijan Robinson 3-yard run (Riley Patterson kick), 1:34. Tied 17–17. **Drive: 6 plays, 70 yards, 1:14.**
- ATL – Drake London 20-yard pass from Michael Penix Jr. (Riley Patterson kick), 0:03. Falcons 24–17. **Drive: 6 plays, 81 yards, 0:37.**

**Third quarter**

- CAR – Tommy Tremble 12-yard pass from Bryce Young (Eddy Piñeiro kick), 10:43. Tied 24–24. **Drive: 4 plays, 21 yards, 1:21.**
- CAR – David Moore 9-yard pass from Bryce Young (Eddy Piñeiro kick), 1:02. Panthers 31–24. **Drive: 9 plays, 58 yards, 5:11.**

**Fourth quarter**

- ATL – Drake London 21-yard pass from Michael Penix Jr. (Riley Patterson kick), 9:50. Tied 31–31. **Drive: 11 plays, 74 yards, 6:12.**
- CAR – Bryce Young 10-yard run (Eddy Piñeiro kick), 4:01. Panthers 38–31. **Drive: 9 plays, 70 yards, 5:49.**
- ATL – Bijan Robinson 4-yard run (Riley Patterson kick), 0:46. Tied 38–38. **Drive: 11 plays, 70 yards, 3:15.**

**Overtime**

- CAR – Miles Sanders 1-yard run, 3:14. Panthers 44–38. **Drive: 10 plays, 70 yards, 6:46.**

**Top passers**

- CAR – Bryce Young – 25/34, 251 yards, 3 TD
- ATL – Michael Penix Jr. – 21/38, 312 yards, 2 TD, INT

**Top rushers**

- CAR – Miles Sanders – 17 rushes, 66 yards, TD
- ATL – Bijan Robinson – 28 rushes, 170 yards, 2 TD

**Top receivers**

- CAR – Jalen Coker – 7 receptions, 62 yards
- ATL – Drake London – 10 receptions, 187 yards, 2 TD

Before the overtime period began, the Buccaneers defeated the Saints, clinching the NFC South and eliminating the Falcons from playoff contention for the seventh consecutive season. With the loss, they finished with an 8–9 record, also suffering their seventh consecutive losing season.

=== Standings ===
==== Division ====
NFC South
	W	L	T	PCT	DIV	CONF	PF	PA	STK
^{(3)} Tampa Bay Buccaneers	10	7	0	.588	4–2	8–4	502	385	W2
Atlanta Falcons	8	9	0	.471	4–2	7–5	389	423	L2
Carolina Panthers	5	12	0	.294	2–4	4–8	341	534	W1
New Orleans Saints	5	12	0	.294	2–4	4–8	338	398	L4

==== Conference ====
NFC
Seed	Team	Division	W	L	T	PCT	DIV	CONF	SOS	SOV	STK
**Division leaders**
1	Detroit Lions	North	15	2	0	.882	6–0	11–1	.516	.494	W3
2	Philadelphia Eagles	East	14	3	0	.824	5–1	9–3	.453	.424	W2
3 (Note: Tampa Bay clinched the #3 seed over Los Angeles based on conference record. (Tampa Bay 8–4 to Los Angeles 6–6))	Tampa Bay Buccaneers	South	10	7	0	.588	4–2	8–4	.502	.465	W2
4 (Note: Los Angeles clinched the NFC West and #4 seed over Seattle based on strength of victory. (Los Angeles .441 to Seattle .424))	Los Angeles Rams	West	10	7	0	.588	4–2	6–6	.505	.441	L1
**Wild cards**
5	Minnesota Vikings	North	14	3	0	.824	4–2	9–3	.474	.408	L1
6	Washington Commanders	East	12	5	0	.706	4–2	9–3	.436	.358	W5
7	Green Bay Packers	North	11	6	0	.647	1–5	6–6	.533	.412	L2
**Did not qualify for the postseason**
8	Seattle Seahawks	West	10	7	0	.588	4–2	6–6	.498	.424	W2
9 (Note: Atlanta finished ahead of Arizona based on conference record. (Atlanta 7–5 to Arizona 4–8))	Atlanta Falcons	South	8	9	0	.471	4–2	7–5	.519	.426	L2
10	Arizona Cardinals	West	8	9	0	.471	3–3	4–8	.536	.404	W1
11	Dallas Cowboys	East	7	10	0	.412	3–3	5–7	.522	.387	L2
12	San Francisco 49ers	West	6	11	0	.353	1–5	4–8	.564	.402	L4
13 (Note: Chicago finished ahead of Carolina based on head-to-head victory.)	Chicago Bears	North	5	12	0	.294	1–5	3–9	.554	.388	W1
14 (Note: Carolina finished ahead of New Orleans based on strength of victory. (Carolina .329 to New Orleans .306))	Carolina Panthers	South	5	12	0	.294	2–4	4–8	.498	.329	W1
15	New Orleans Saints	South	5	12	0	.294	2–4	4–8	.505	.306	L4
16	New York Giants	East	3	14	0	.176	0–6	1–11	.554	.412	L1
**Tiebreakers** (Note: When breaking ties for three or more teams under the NFL's rules, they are first broken within divisions, then comparing only the highest ranked remaining team from each division.)

=== Team leaders ===
Category	Player(s)	Value
Passing yards	Kirk Cousins	3,508
Passing touchdowns	Kirk Cousins	18
Rushing yards	Bijan Robinson	1,456
Rushing touchdowns	Bijan Robinson	14
Receptions	Drake London	100
Receiving yards	Drake London	1,271
Receiving touchdowns	Drake London	9
Points	Younghoe Koo	101
Kickoff return yards	Avery Williams	408
Punt return yards	Avery Williams	185
Tackles	Kaden Elliss	149
Sacks	Arnold Ebiketie	6.0
Forced fumbles	Jessie Bates	4
Interceptions	Jessie Bates	4
Pass deflections	Dee Alford	11
