= Trishton Jackson =

American football player (born 1998)

Profile
- Position: Wide receiver

Personal information
- Born: March 9, 1998 (age 28); Detroit, Michigan, U.S.
- Listed height: 6 ft 1 in (1.85 m)
- Listed weight: 191 lb (87 kg)

Career information
- High school: West Bloomfield (West Bloomfield, Michigan)
- College: Michigan State (2016–2017); Syracuse (2018–2019)
- NFL draft: 2020: undrafted

Career history
- Los Angeles Rams (2020); Minnesota Vikings (2021–2024); Arizona Cardinals (2025)*
- * Offseason or practice squad member only

Awards and highlights
- Second-team All-ACC (2019)

Career NFL statistics as of 2023
- Receptions: 2
- Receiving yards: 9
- Stats at Pro Football Reference

Trishton Jackson (born March 9, 1998) is an American professional football wide receiver. He played college football for the Michigan State Spartans and Syracuse Orange. He has previously played for the Los Angeles Rams.

== College career ==
Jackson began his collegiate career at Michigan State. As a true freshman, he caught five passes for 89 yards and one touchdown. He played in 12 games in his sophomore season, starting four and finishing the season with 12 receptions for 143 yards. After the season Jackson announced he would be transferring to Syracuse University.

Jackson sat out the 2018 regular season at Syracuse per NCAA transfer rules. He was eligible to play in the 2018 Camping World Bowl and caught three passes for 24 yards, including a 14-yard touchdown reception, in the Orange's 34–18 win over West Virginia.

As a redshirt junior, he caught 66 passes for 1,023 yards and 11 touchdowns and was named second-team All-Atlantic Coast Conference. After the end of the season Jackson announced that he would forgo his final year of eligibility to enter the 2020 NFL Draft.

== Professional career ==
Pre-draft measurables
Height	Weight	Arm length	Hand span	Wingspan	40-yard dash	10-yard split	20-yard split	Vertical jump	Broad jump
6 ft 0 3/4 in (1.85 m)	197 lb (89 kg)	32 3/8 in (0.82 m)	9 3/4 in (0.25 m)	6 ft 5 in (1.96 m)	4.50 s	1.53 s	2.66 s	36.0 in (0.91 m)	9 ft 9 in (2.97 m)
All values from NFL Combine

=== Los Angeles Rams ===
Jackson was signed by the Los Angeles Rams as an undrafted free agent on April 25, 2020.

On August 31, 2021, Jackson was waived by the Rams.

=== Minnesota Vikings ===
On September 2, 2021, Jackson was signed to the practice squad of the Minnesota Vikings. He signed a reserve/future contract with the Vikings on January 10, 2022. He was waived on August 30, and re-signed to the practice squad the next day. Jackson signed a reserve/future contract with Minnesota on January 16, 2023.

Jackson was waived on August 29, 2023, and re-signed to the practice squad the next day. On September 23, the Vikings elevated him to the active roster. On October 11, he was signed to the active roster. He was waived on October 17, re-signed to the practice squad, then signed back to the active roster on October 28. Jackson was released on November 21 and re-signed to the practice squad. Following the end of the regular season, the Vikings signed him to a reserve/future contract on January 8, 2024.

Jackson was waived on October 19, 2024, and re-signed to the practice squad.

=== Arizona Cardinals ===
On January 16, 2025, Jackson signed a reserve/future contract with the Arizona Cardinals. He was placed on injured reserve on August 12, and released on September 23.
