= Jordan Addison =

American football player (born 2002)

No. 3 – Minnesota Vikings
- Position: Wide receiver
- Roster status: Active

Personal information
- Born: January 27, 2002 (age 24); Frederick, Maryland, U.S.
- Listed height: 5 ft 11 in (1.80 m)
- Listed weight: 179 lb (81 kg)

Career information
- High school: Tuscarora (Frederick)
- College: Pittsburgh (2020–2021); USC (2022)
- NFL draft: 2023: 1st round, 23rd overall pick

Career history
- Minnesota Vikings (2023–present)

Awards and highlights
- PFWA All-Rookie Team (2023); Fred Biletnikoff Award (2021); Consensus All-American (2021); NCAA receiving touchdowns co-leader (2021); First-team All-Pac-12 (2022); First-team All-ACC (2021)

Career NFL statistics as of Week 10, 2026
- Receptions: 193
- Receiving yards: 2,673
- Receiving touchdowns: 23
- Stats at Pro Football Reference

Jordan Lee Addison (born January 27, 2002) is an American professional football wide receiver for the Minnesota Vikings of the National Football League (NFL). He played college football for the Pittsburgh Panthers, where he won the 2021 Fred Biletnikoff Award before playing the following season at USC. Addison was selected by the Vikings in the first round of the 2023 NFL draft.

== Early life ==
Addison attended Tuscarora High School in Frederick, Maryland. He played wide receiver, quarterback and defensive back in high school. He committed to the University of Pittsburgh to play college football.

== College career ==
Addison played 10 games and started eight as a true freshman at Pittsburgh in 2020. He led the team with 60 receptions for 666 yards and four touchdowns. He returned to Pittsburgh as a starter in 2021. In 2021, he went on to lead college football in touchdown receptions with 17 in the 2021 regular season while catching 100 passes for 1,593 yards. He earned consensus All-American honors and won the 2021 Fred Biletnikoff Award.

In May 2022, Addison announced that he would be transferring to the University of Southern California to play for the USC Trojans football team. He chose to wear #3 for the Trojans, which was previously retired in honor of Carson Palmer, the 2002 Heisman Trophy winner.

== Professional career ==
Pre-draft measurables
Height	Weight	Arm length	Hand span	Wingspan	40-yard dash	10-yard split	20-yard split	20-yard shuttle	Three-cone drill	Vertical jump	Broad jump
5 ft 11 1/8 in (1.81 m)	173 lb (78 kg)	30 7/8 in (0.78 m)	8 3/4 in (0.22 m)	6 ft 2 1/2 in (1.89 m)	4.49 s	1.56 s	2.62 s	4.19 s	7.05 s	34.0 in (0.86 m)	10 ft 2 in (3.10 m)
All values from NFL Combine/Pro Day

Addison was selected by the Minnesota Vikings in the first round, 23rd overall, of the 2023 NFL draft. In his NFL debut against the Tampa Bay Buccaneers in week 1, Addison had four receptions for 61 yards and his first NFL touchdown, as the Vikings lost 20–17. During week 2 against the Philadelphia Eagles, Addison had three receptions for 72 yards and a touchdown in the 34–28 loss. In week 7, against the 49ers, he had seven receptions for 123 yards and two touchdowns in the 22–17 victory. In week 15 against the Bengals, he had six receptions for 111 yards and two touchdowns in the 27–24 loss. As a rookie, Addison appeared in all 17 games and started 14. He recorded 70 receptions for 911 receiving yards and ten receiving touchdowns. He was named to the PFWA All-Rookie Team.

In Week 12 of the 2024 season, Addison had eight receptions for 162 yards and a touchdown in a 30–27 overtime win over the Chicago Bears. In Week 14, he had eight receptions for 133 yards and three touchdowns in the 42–21 win over the Atlanta Falcons. In the 2024 season, Addison had 63 receptions for 875 yards and nine touchdowns.

Addison was suspended the first three games of the 2025 season for violating the NFL's substance abuse policy. Addison made his 2025 season debut with four receptions for 114 yards in a 24–21 loss to the Pittsburgh Steelers in Week 4. He had nine receptions for 128 yards in a Week 7 28–22 loss to the Philadelphia Eagles. He finished the 2025 season with 42 receptions for 610 receiving yards and three receiving touchdowns.

On April 27, 2026, the Vikings picked up Addison's fifth-year option. Addison suffered a thumb injury on a practice and he missed the 30–10 win against the Green Bay Packers in week 10. Initially it was announced that he would be placed on the team's injured reserve list, but Addison had a successful surgery so head coach Kevin O'Connell decided to keep him on the active roster.

== Career statistics ==
=== NFL ===
Legend
**Bold**	Career high

==== Regular season ====
Year	Team	Games		Receiving					Rushing					Fumbles	
Year	Team	GP	GS	Rec	Yds	Avg	Lng	TD	Att	Yds	Avg	Lng	TD	Fum	Lost
2023	MIN	**17**	14	**70**	**911**	13.0	62	**10**	1	2	2.0	2	0	0	0
2024	MIN	15	**15**	63	875	13.9	69	9	**3**	20	6.7	**9**	**1**	0	0
2025	MIN	14	12	42	610	**14.5**	**81**	3	2	**81**	**40.5**	65	**1**	0	0
2026	MIN	7	7	18	277	15.4	51	1	2	2	1.0	3	0	0	0
Career		53	48	193	2,673	13.8	81	23	8	105	13.1	65	2	0	0

==== Postseason ====
Year	Team	Games		Receiving					Fumbles	
Year	Team	GP	GS	Rec	Yds	Avg	Lng	TD	Fum	Lost
2024	MIN	1	1	3	29	9.7	15	0	0	0
Career		1	1	3	29	9.7	15	0	0	0

=== College ===
Season	Team	Games		Receiving				Rushing				Punt returns			
Season	Team	GP	GS	Rec	Yds	Avg	TD	Att	Yds	Avg	TD	Ret	Yds	Avg	TD
2020	Pittsburgh	10	8	60	666	11.1	4	**9**	**58**	6.4	0	2	15	7.5	0
2021	Pittsburgh	**14**	**14**	**100**	**1,593**	**15.9**	**17**	7	56	**8.0**	**1**	**12**	**185**	**15.4**	0
2022	USC	11	11	59	875	14.8	8	4	33	8.3	0	4	19	4.8	0
Career		35	33	219	3,134	14.3	29	20	147	7.4	1	18	219	12.2	0

== Legal issues ==
On July 20, 2023, Addison was pulled over and cited for speed and reckless driving before reporting to his first training camp. Driving a Lamborghini Urus on Interstate 94 in Saint Paul, he was allegedly going 140 miles per hour (230 km/h) in a 55 miles per hour (89 km/h) zone at 3 AM. The same day, the Vikings released a statement, stating they were aware of the incident and were looking into it. Addison told a police officer at the scene that he was driving at that speed due to a medical emergency involving his pet dog. The next month, Addison pled guilty to a petty misdemeanor, which resulted in him paying a $686 fine and having his driver's license revoked for six months.

Shortly before midnight on July 12, 2024, Addison was arrested near the Los Angeles International Airport (LAX) on suspicion of driving under the influence of alcohol. At the time of his arrest, California Highway Patrol (CHP) officers found Addison asleep at the wheel, with his car blocking traffic lanes. He was arrested following a 30-minute investigation. He was then released from custody two hours later on July 13, with no charges yet to be filed. Despite this, Addison was still facing DUI charges. On July 31, 2024, Addison was charged with two misdemeanors, driving under the influence of alcohol and driving with blood-alcohol content over California's legal limit of .08 percent. His arraignment and plea hearing, at the Los Angeles Superior Court, was set for July 15, 2025. On July 17, 2025, Addison agreed to a plea on a lesser charge, known as a wet reckless, in order to settle the case.

On January 12, 2026, Addison was arrested in Hillsborough County, Florida, on a misdemeanor trespassing charge. He was later released, after posting a $500 bond.
