= 2022 Minnesota Vikings season =

62nd season in franchise history

- Owner: Zygi Wilf
- General manager: Kwesi Adofo-Mensah
- Head coach: Kevin O'Connell
- Offensive coordinator: Wes Phillips
- Defensive coordinator: Ed Donatell
- Home stadium: U.S. Bank Stadium

Results
- Record: 13–4
- Division place: 1st NFC North
- Playoffs: Lost Wild Card Playoffs (vs. Giants) 24–31
- All-Pros: 3: WR Justin Jefferson (1st team); LS Andrew DePaola (1st team); KR Kene Nwangwu (2nd team)
- Pro Bowlers: 7: QB Kirk Cousins; RB Dalvin Cook; WR Justin Jefferson; TE T. J. Hockenson; OLB Za'Darius Smith; OLB Danielle Hunter; LS Andrew DePaola

Uniform
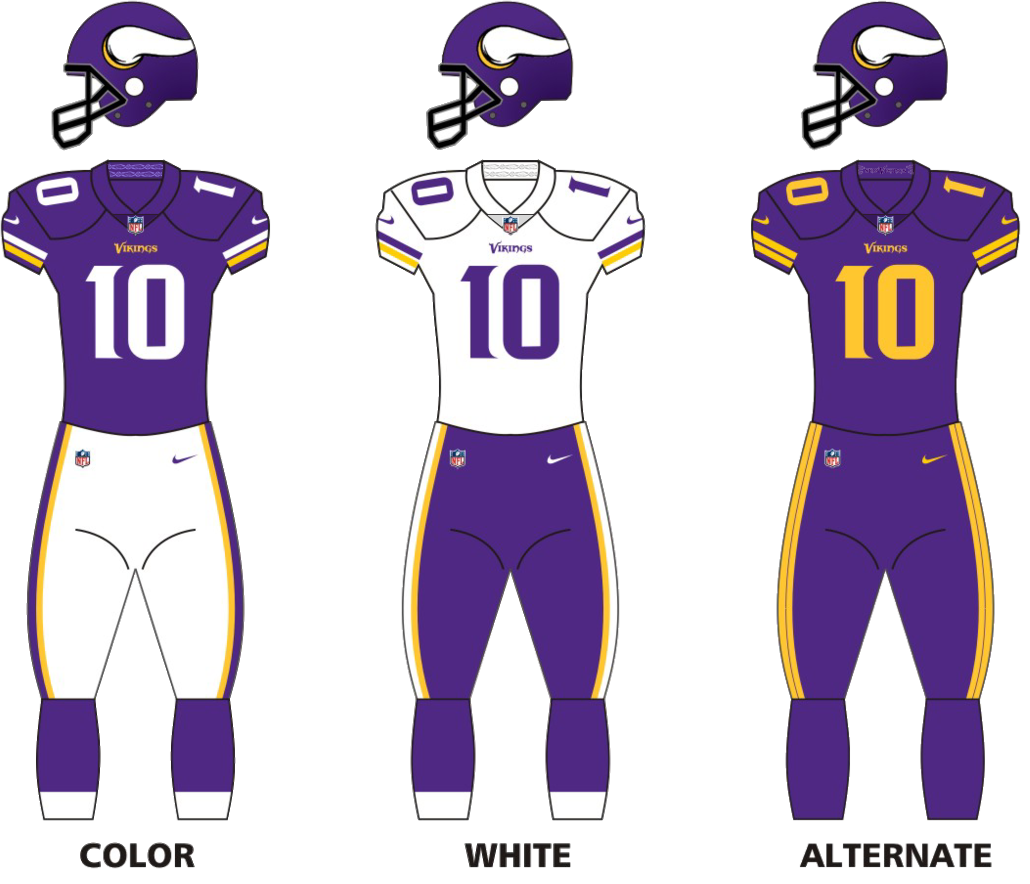

The 2022 season was the Minnesota Vikings' 62nd in the National Football League (NFL), their seventh playing home games at U.S. Bank Stadium and their first under new general manager Kwesi Adofo-Mensah and head coach Kevin O'Connell, following the firings of Rick Spielman and Mike Zimmer at the end of the 2021 season.

The Vikings started 8–1 for the first time since 2009. They improved upon their 8–9 record from 2021 and clinched the NFC North for the first time since 2017, finishing with a 13–4 record. Despite the Vikings' strong record, many analysts did not view them as legitimate championship contenders due to most of their wins being within one score (11 of 13 wins) and three of their four losses being blowouts. The Vikings ranked 31st in total yards allowed (6,608) and finished the season with a negative point differential (−3), the first time this had been done by a team with at least 12 wins. Some of those claims subsided after the win over the Colts, in which the Vikings completed the largest comeback in NFL history; having trailed 33–0 at halftime, they rallied to win 39–36 in overtime.

In the playoffs, the Vikings were eliminated in the Wild Card round after losing 31–24, their first and only one-score loss of the season, to the New York Giants.

== Transactions ==
=== Free agency ===
Players lost in 2022
Name	Position	Type	2022 team	Contract	Ref.
Tyler Conklin	TE	UFA	New York Jets	3 years, $20.25 million	
Mason Cole	C		Pittsburgh Steelers	3 years, $15.75 million	
Xavier Woods	S	UFA	Carolina Panthers	3 years, $15 million	
Anthony Barr	OLB	UFA	Dallas Cowboys	1 year, $2 million	
Nick Vigil	OLB		Arizona Cardinals	1 year, $1.77 million	
Chris Herndon	TE	UFA	New Orleans Saints	1 year, $1.035 million	
Chad Beebe	WR		Houston Texans	1 year, $1.035 million	
Tashawn Bower	DE		Las Vegas Raiders	1 year, $1.035 million	
Mackensie Alexander	CB		Miami Dolphins		
Sheldon Richardson	DT				
Rashod Hill	G		Washington Commanders		
Dede Westbrook	WR				
Everson Griffen	DE				
Wayne Gallman	RB				
Jordon Scott	DT				
Eddie Yarbrough	DE				

Players signed in 2022
Name	Position	Type	2021 team	Contract	Ref.
Za'Darius Smith	OLB	UFA	Green Bay Packers	3 years, $42 million	
Harrison Phillips	DT	UFA	Buffalo Bills	3 years, $19.5 million	
Jordan Hicks	ILB	UFA	Arizona Cardinals	2 years, $10 million	
Chris Reed	G	UFA	Indianapolis Colts	2 years, $4.5 million	
Patrick Peterson	CB	UFA	Minnesota Vikings	1 year, $4 million	
Jesse Davis	OT	UFA	Miami Dolphins	1 year, $3 million	
Johnny Mundt	TE	UFA	Los Angeles Rams	2 years, $2.415 million	
Chandon Sullivan	CB	UFA	Green Bay Packers	1 year, $1.75 million	
Sean Mannion	QB	UFA	Minnesota Vikings	1 year, $1.2725 million	
Albert Wilson	WR	UFA	Miami Dolphins	1 year, $1.12 million	
Nate Hairston	CB		Denver Broncos	1 year, $1.06 million	
Jonathan Bullard	DE		Atlanta Falcons	1 year, $1.035 million	
Tye Smith	CB		Minnesota Vikings	1 year, $1.035 million	
Austin Schlottmann	G		Denver Broncos	1 year, $965,000	
Andre Mintze	DE		Denver Broncos	1 year, $825,000	
Shaun Beyer	TE		Denver Broncos	1 year, $705,000	

=== Draft ===
2022 Minnesota Vikings draft selections
Round	Selection	Player	Position	College	Notes
1	12	Traded to the Detroit Lions (Note: The Vikings traded first- and second-round selections (12th and 46th overall) to the Detroit Lions in exchange for first-, second- and third-round selections (32nd, 34th and 66th overall).)			
1	32	Lewis Cine	S	Georgia	From Rams via Lions
2	34	Traded to the Green Bay Packers (Note: The Vikings traded a second-round selection (34th overall) to the Green Bay Packers in exchange for two second-round selections (53rd and 59th overall).)			From Lions
2	42	Andrew Booth Jr.	CB	Clemson	From Commanders via Colts (Note: The Vikings traded second-, third- and sixth-round selections (53rd, 77th and 192nd overall) to the Indianapolis Colts in exchange for second- and fourth-round selections (42nd and 122nd overall).)
2	46	Traded to the Detroit Lions			
2	53	Traded to the Indianapolis Colts			From Raiders via Packers
2	59	Ed Ingram	G	LSU	From Packers
3	66	Brian Asamoah	LB	Oklahoma	From Lions
3	77	Traded to the Indianapolis Colts			
4	117	Traded to the New York Jets (Note: The Vikings traded a fourth-round selection (117th overall) to the Jets in exchange for a sixth-round selection (184th overall) and TE Chris Herndon.)			
4	118	Akayleb Evans	CB	Missouri	From Browns (Note: The Vikings traded a fifth-round selection (156th overall) and a 2023 fourth-round selection to the Cleveland Browns in exchange for a fourth-round selection (118th overall).)
4	122	Traded to the Las Vegas Raiders (Note: The Vikings traded fourth- and seventh-round selections (122nd and 250th overall) to the Las Vegas Raiders in exchange for fourth- and seventh-round selections (126th and 227th overall).)			From Colts
4	126	Traded to the Las Vegas Raiders (Note: The Vikings traded a fourth-round selection (126th overall) to the Las Vegas Raiders in exchange for two fifth-round selections (165th and 169th overall).)			From Raiders
5	156	Traded to the Cleveland Browns			From Ravens (Note: The Vikings traded DE Yannick Ngakoue to the Baltimore Ravens in exchange for a conditional fifth-round selection (156th overall) and a 2021 third-round selection; the fifth-round selection would have become a fourth-round selection if Ngakoue had been a first-ballot selection to the 2021 Pro Bowl.)
5	157	Traded to the Jacksonville Jaguars (Note: The Vikings traded a fifth-round selection (157th overall) and a 2021 second-round selection to the Jacksonville Jaguars in exchange for DE Yannick Ngakoue; the fifth-round selection would have become a fourth-rounder if Ngakoue had been a first-ballot selection to the 2021 Pro Bowl.)			
5	165	Esezi Otomewo	DE	Minnesota	From Raiders
5	169	Ty Chandler	RB	North Carolina	From Titans via Raiders
6	184	Vederian Lowe	OT	Illinois	From Jets
6	191	Jalen Nailor	WR	Michigan State	From Ravens via Chiefs (Note: The Vikings traded a seventh-round selection (233rd overall) and CB Mike Hughes to the Kansas City Chiefs in exchange for a sixth-round selection (191st overall).)
6	192	Traded to the Indianapolis Colts			
7	227	Nick Muse	TE	South Carolina	From Panthers via Raiders
7	233	Traded to the Kansas City Chiefs			
7	250	Traded to the Las Vegas Raiders			From 49ers via Broncos (Note: The Vikings traded a 2023 seventh-round selection and DE Stephen Weatherly to the Denver Broncos in exchange for a seventh-round selection (250th overall).)

Draft trades

2022 Minnesota Vikings undrafted free agents
Name	Position	College	Ref.
Gabe Brkic	K	Oklahoma	
Mike Brown	S	Miami (OH)	
Thomas Hennigan	WR	Appalachian State	
Bryant Koback	RB	Toledo	
William Kwenkeu	OLB	Temple	
Zach McCloud	OLB	Miami (FL)	
Josh Sokol	C	Sacred Heart	
Tyarise Stevenson	DT	Tulsa	
Luiji Vilain	OLB	Wake Forest	
Ryan Wright	P	Tulane	

Despite initially announcing Virginia Tech wide receiver Tré Turner as one of their UDFAs, Turner ultimately signed with the Las Vegas Raiders, who offered him a better contract.

== Staff ==
2022 Minnesota Vikings staff
Front office: Owner/chairman – Zygi Wilf; Owner/president – Mark Wilf; Owner/vice chairman – Leonard Wilf; Executive vice president/chief marketing officer – Martin Nance; Chief operating officer – Andrew Miller; General manager – Kwesi Adofo-Mensah; Executive vice president of football operations – Rob Brzezinski; Senior vice president of player personnel – Ryan Grigson; Vice president of football operations – Demitrius Washington; Director of player personnel – Ryan Monnens; Assistant director of player personnel – Chisom Opara; Director of pro personnel – Chris Blanco; Director of college scouting – Mike Sholiton; Assistant director of college scouting – Pat Roberts; Director of football quantitative methods – Scott Kuhn; Senior personnel executive – Jamaal Stephenson; Consultant – Bud Grant; Head coaches: Head coach – Kevin O'Connell; Assistant head coach – Mike Pettine; Offensive coaches: Offensive coordinator – Wes Phillips; Quarterbacks – Chris O'Hara; Assistant quarterbacks – Jerrod Johnson; Running backs/run game coordinator – Curtis Modkins; Wide receivers – Keenan McCardell; Assistant wide receivers – Tony Sorrentino; Tight ends/passing game coordinator – Brian Angelichio; Offensive line – Chris Kuper; Assistant offensive line – Justin Rascati; Pass game specialist/game management coordinator – Ryan Cordell; Offensive quality control – Derron Montgomery	Defensive coaches: Defensive coordinator – Ed Donatell; Defensive line – Chris Rumph; Assistant defensive line – A'Lique Terry; Outside linebackers/pass rush specialist – Mike Smith; Inside linebackers – Greg Manusky; Assistant linebackers – Sam Siefkes; Defensive backs – Daronte Jones; Assistant defensive backs/safeties – Roy Anderson; Defensive quality control – Steve Donatell; Special teams coaches: Special teams coordinator – Matt Daniels; Assistant special teams – Ben Kotwica; Strength and conditioning: Director of player performance – Josh Hingst; Assistant director of player performance – Derik Keyes; Assistant player performance – Marquis Johnson

=== Offseason changes ===
==== Head coach ====
On January 10, 2022, the Vikings fired head coach Mike Zimmer, who had led the team to two NFC North titles and three NFL playoffs appearances in his eight years in charge. On February 16, 2022, former Los Angeles Rams offensive coordinator Kevin O'Connell was named the 10th head coach in franchise history.

==== General manager ====
The Minnesota Vikings fired tenth-year general manager Rick Spielman on January 10, 2022, who most notably led the organization to draft Adrian Peterson, Percy Harvin, Harrison Smith, Teddy Bridgewater and Anthony Barr, among other draftees. The Vikings hired Cleveland Browns VP of Football Operations Kwesi Adofo-Mensah on January 26, 2022. Initially, Adofo-Mensah and Kansas City Chiefs Executive Director of Player Personnel Ryan Poles were the finalists for the general manager position. However, Poles withdrew on January 25, 2022, for the general manager position at the Chicago Bears, which ultimately resulted in Adofo-Mensah being hired.

== Final roster ==
2022 Minnesota Vikings roster
Quarterbacks (QB): 8 Kirk Cousins; 12 Nick Mullens; Running backs (RB): 32 Ty Chandler; 4 Dalvin Cook; 30 C. J. Ham FB; 2 Alexander Mattison; 26 Kene Nwangwu; Wide receivers (WR): 18 Justin Jefferson; 83 Jalen Nailor; 17 K. J. Osborn; 5 Jalen Reagor; 19 Adam Thielen; Tight ends (TE): 87 T. J. Hockenson; 86 Johnny Mundt; 84 Irv Smith Jr.	Offensive linemen (OL): 56 Garrett Bradbury C; 64 Blake Brandel T; 72 Ezra Cleveland G; 71 Christian Darrisaw T; 67 Ed Ingram G; 63 Vederian Lowe T; 62 Chris Reed G; 74 Oli Udoh T; Defensive linemen (DL): 96 Ross Blacklock DE; 93 Jonathan Bullard DE; 92 James Lynch DE; 90 Esezi Otomewo DE; 97 Harrison Phillips NT; 94 Dalvin Tomlinson DE; 95 Khyiris Tonga NT	Linebackers (LB): 33 Brian Asamoah ILB; 45 Troy Dye ILB; 58 Jordan Hicks ILB; 99 Danielle Hunter OLB; 91 Patrick Jones II OLB; 54 Eric Kendricks ILB; 47 William Kwenkeu ILB; 55 Za'Darius Smith OLB; 43 Luiji Vilain OLB; 98 D. J. Wonnum OLB; Defensive backs (DB): 27 Kalon Barnes CB; 29 Kris Boyd CB; 24 Camryn Bynum FS; 3 Cameron Dantzler CB; 25 Theo Jackson SS; 44 Josh Metellus SS; 7 Patrick Peterson CB; 20 Duke Shelley CB; 22 Harrison Smith SS; 39 Chandon Sullivan CB; Special teams (ST): 42 Andrew DePaola LS; 1 Greg Joseph K; 14 Ryan Wright P	Practice squad: 85 Dan Chisena WR; 57 Ryan Connelly ILB; 46 Myles Dorn FS; 73 Bobby Evans T; 31 Tay Gowan CB; 68 Kyle Hinton G; 9 Trishton Jackson WR; 38 Bryant Koback RB; 34 Nick Muse TE; 35 Parry Nickerson CB; 89 James O'Shaughnessy TE; 13 Blake Proehl WR; 15 Josh Rosen QB; 50 T. J. Smith NT; 60 Josh Sokol C; 51 Benton Whitley OLB; Reserve: 23 Andrew Booth Jr. CB (IR); 6 Lewis Cine FS (IR); 82 Ben Ellefson TE (IR); 21 Akayleb Evans CB (IR); -- Thomas Hennigan WR (IR); 81 Bisi Johnson WR (IR); 75 Brian O'Neill T (IR); 65 Austin Schlottmann C (IR); 79 Kenny Willekes OLB (IR); Rookies in italics 53 active, 9 reserve, 16 practice squad

== Preseason ==
=== Schedule ===
The Vikings' preseason opponents and schedule were announced on May 12, 2022. They traveled to face the Las Vegas Raiders and the Denver Broncos either side of a home game against the San Francisco 49ers. They lost all three games by between 6 and 10 points.

Week	Date	Opponent	Result	Record	Venue	Recap
1	August 14	at Las Vegas Raiders	L 20–26	0–1	Allegiant Stadium	Recap
2	August 20	San Francisco 49ers	L 7–17	0–2	U.S. Bank Stadium	Recap
3	August 27	at Denver Broncos	L 13–23	0–3	Empower Field at Mile High	Recap

=== Game summaries ===
==== Week 1: at Las Vegas Raiders ====
Week 1: Minnesota Vikings at Las Vegas Raiders – Game summary

Quarter	1	2	3	4	Total
Vikings	0	6	7	7	20
Raiders	3	7	6	10	26

at Allegiant Stadium, Las Vegas, Nevada

- Date: August 14
- Game time: 1:25 p.m. PDT
  3:25 p.m. CDT
- Game weather: Partly cloudy, 96 °F (36 °C)
- Referee: Clete Blakeman (34)
- TV: KMSP
- Recap, Game Book

Game information

First quarter

- LV – Daniel Carlson 23-yard field goal, 5:31. Raiders 3–0. Drive: 15 plays, 67 yards, 6:27.

Second quarter

- LV – Jarrett Stidham 4-yard run (Daniel Carlson kick), 14:52. Raiders 10–0. Drive: 8 plays, 52 yards, 3:56.
- MIN – Greg Joseph 20-yard field goal, 8:00. Raiders 10–3. Drive: 11 plays, 75 yards, 6:52.
- MIN – Greg Joseph 23-yard field goal, 1:32. Raiders 10–6. Drive: 12 plays, 79 yards, 4:47.

Third quarter

- LV – D. J. Turner 34-yard pass from Nick Mullens (kick failed, wide left), 9:12. Raiders 16–6. Drive: 10 plays, 79 yards, 5:48.
- MIN – Albert Wilson 2-yard pass from Kellen Mond (Greg Joseph kick), 6:24. Raiders 16–13. Drive: 7 plays, 41 yards, 2:48.

Fourth quarter

- LV – Brittain Brown 1-yard run (Daniel Carlson kick), 13:41. Raiders 23–13. Drive: 15 plays, 60 yards, 7:43.
- LV – Daniel Carlson 47-yard field goal, 6:38. Raiders 26–13. Drive: 7 plays, 28 yards, 3:23.
- MIN – Albert Wilson 20-yard pass from Kellen Mond (Greg Joseph kick), 3:44. Raiders 26–20. Drive: 7 plays, 75 yards, 2:54.

Top passers

- MIN – Kellen Mond – 9/14, 119 yards, 2 TD
- LV – Nick Mullens – 7/9, 94 yards, TD

Top rushers

- MIN – Ty Chandler – 5 rushes, 50 yards
- LV – Brittain Brown – 14 rushes, 54 yards, TD

Top receivers

- MIN – Myron Mitchell – 2 receptions, 37 yards
- LV – D. J. Turner – 3 receptions, 58 yards, TD

==== Week 2: vs. San Francisco 49ers ====
Week 2: San Francisco 49ers at Minnesota Vikings – Game summary

Quarter	1	2	3	4	Total
49ers	0	6	0	11	17
Vikings	0	7	0	0	7

at U.S. Bank Stadium, Minneapolis, Minnesota

- Date: August 20
- Game time: 6:05 p.m. CDT
- Game weather: None (indoor stadium)
- Game attendance: 66,714
- Referee: Adrian Hill (29)
- TV: KMSP
- Recap, Game Book

Game information

First quarter

- No scoring plays.

Second quarter

- SF – Robbie Gould 49-yard field goal, 9:35. 49ers 3–0. Drive: 4 plays, 3 yards, 1:36.
- MIN – Ty Chandler 3-yard run (Greg Joseph kick), 1:39. Vikings 7–3. Drive: 8 plays, 60 yards, 3:00.
- SF – Robbie Gould 46-yard field goal, 0:00. Vikings 7–6. Drive: 9 plays, 47 yards, 1:39.

Third quarter

- No scoring plays.

Fourth quarter

- SF – JaMycal Hasty 2-yard pass from Nate Sudfeld (Nate Sudfeld–Danny Gray pass), 14:57. 49ers 14–7. Drive: 14 plays, 79 yards, 7:58.
- SF – Robbie Gould 28-yard field goal, 4:09. 49ers 17–7. Drive: 9 plays, 27 yards, 4:17.

Top passers

- SF – Brock Purdy – 14/23, 128 yards
- MIN – Kellen Mond – 10/20, 82 yards

Top rushers

- SF – Jordan Mason – 9 rushes, 57 yards
- MIN – Ty Chandler – 5 rushes, 19 yards, TD

Top receivers

- SF – Tanner Hudson – 5 receptions, 43 yards
- MIN – Bisi Johnson – 3 receptions, 29 yards
- MIN – Nick Muse – 3 receptions, 29 yards

==== Week 3: at Denver Broncos ====
Week 3: Minnesota Vikings at Denver Broncos – Game summary

Quarter	1	2	3	4	Total
Vikings	0	10	0	3	13
Broncos	0	17	0	6	23

at Empower Field at Mile High, Denver, Colorado

- Date: August 27
- Game time: 12:00 p.m. CDT
- Game weather: Partly cloudy, 84 °F (29 °C)
- Game attendance: 76,473
- Referee: Clay Martin (19)
- TV: KMSP
- Recap, Game Book

Game information

First quarter

- No scoring plays.

Second quarter

- DEN – Brandon McManus 50-yard field goal, 12:53. Broncos 3–0. Drive: 9 plays, 59 yards, 3:43.
- MIN – Bryant Koback 1-yard run (Greg Joseph kick), 7:41. Vikings 7–3. Drive: 11 plays, 78 yards, 5:12.
- DEN – Montrell Washington 11-yard run (Brandon McManus kick), 5:48. Broncos 10–7. Drive: 5 plays, 75 yards, 1:53.
- DEN – Baron Browning 17-yard fumble return (Brandon McManus kick), 0:48. Broncos 17–7.
- MIN – Greg Joseph 46-yard field goal, 0:00. Broncos 17–10.

Third quarter

- No scoring plays.

Fourth quarter

- MIN – Greg Joseph 58-yard field goal, 14:55. Broncos 17–13. Drive: 9 plays, 41 yards, 3:40.
- DEN – Brandon McManus 40-yard field goal, 3:19. Broncos 20–13. Drive: 11 plays, 64 yards, 3:19.
- DEN – Brandon McManus 31-yard field goal, 0:19. Broncos 23–13. Drive: 4 plays, −5 yards, 1:48.

Top passers

- MIN – Sean Mannion – 9/16, 121 yards
- DEN – Brett Rypien – 14/21, 137 yards, INT

Top rushers

- MIN – Ty Chandler – 5 rushes, 44 yards
- DEN – Devine Ozigbo – 13 rushes, 59 yards

Top receivers

- MIN – Ihmir Smith-Marsette – 3 receptions, 63 yards
- DEN – Seth Williams – 4 receptions, 68 yards

== Regular season ==
=== Schedule ===
On May 4, the NFL announced that the Vikings would play the New Orleans Saints at Tottenham Hotspur Stadium in London, United Kingdom, on October 2, as part of the league's International Series. The game would kick off at 2:30 p.m. BST/8:30 a.m. CDT, televised by the NFL Network, with the Saints serving as the home team. On May 9, the NFL announced that the Vikings would play at the Philadelphia Eagles at 7:30 p.m. CDT on September 19, as part of ESPN's Week 2 Monday Night doubleheader.

The remainder of the Vikings' 2022 schedule, with exact dates and times, was announced on May 12. In addition to their usual six games home and away against their NFC North rivals, the Vikings also played games against each of the teams from the NFC East and the AFC East, as well as the two teams that, like the Vikings, finished in second place in the NFC West and NFC South in 2021: the Arizona Cardinals and the aforementioned Saints. The Vikings' week 15 matchup was against the Indianapolis Colts, one of the second-placed teams from the American Football Conference (AFC) whom they were not originally scheduled to play in 2022.

Week	Date	Opponent	Result	Record	Venue	Recap
1	September 11	**Green Bay Packers**	**W** 23–7	1–0	U.S. Bank Stadium	Recap
2	September 19	at Philadelphia Eagles	**L** 7–24	1–1	Lincoln Financial Field	Recap
3	September 25	**Detroit Lions**	**W** 28–24	2–1	U.S. Bank Stadium	Recap
4	October 2	at New Orleans Saints	**W** 28–25	3–1	(United Kingdom) Tottenham Hotspur Stadium (London)	Recap
5	October 9	**Chicago Bears**	**W** 29–22	4–1	U.S. Bank Stadium	Recap
6	October 16	at Miami Dolphins	**W** 24–16	5–1	Hard Rock Stadium	Recap
7	Bye					
8	October 30	Arizona Cardinals	**W** 34–26	6–1	U.S. Bank Stadium	Recap
9	November 6	at Washington Commanders	**W** 20–17	7–1	FedExField	Recap
10	November 13	at Buffalo Bills	**W** 33–30 (OT)	8–1	Highmark Stadium	Recap
11	November 20	Dallas Cowboys	**L** 3–40	8–2	U.S. Bank Stadium	Recap
12	November 24	New England Patriots	**W** 33–26	9–2	U.S. Bank Stadium	Recap
13	December 4	New York Jets	**W** 27–22	10–2	U.S. Bank Stadium	Recap
14	December 11	at **Detroit Lions**	**L** 23–34	10–3	Ford Field	Recap
15	December 17	Indianapolis Colts	**W** 39–36 (OT)	11–3	U.S. Bank Stadium	Recap
16	December 24	New York Giants	**W** 27–24	12–3	U.S. Bank Stadium	Recap
17	January 1	at **Green Bay Packers**	**L** 17–41	12–4	Lambeau Field	Recap
18	January 8	at **Chicago Bears**	**W** 29–13	13–4	Soldier Field	Recap

Note: Intra-division opponents are in bold text.

=== Game summaries ===
==== Week 1: vs. Green Bay Packers ====
Week 1: Green Bay Packers at Minnesota Vikings – Game summary

Quarter	1	2	3	4	Total
Packers	0	0	7	0	**7**
**Vikings**	7	10	3	3	**23**

at U.S. Bank Stadium, Minneapolis, Minnesota

- Date: September 11
- Game time: 3:25 p.m. CDT
- Game weather: None (indoor stadium)
- Game attendance: 66,959
- Referee: Bill Vinovich (52)
- TV announcers (Fox): Kevin Burkhardt, Greg Olsen, Tom Rinaldi and Erin Andrews
- Recap, Game Book

Game information

**First quarter**

- MIN – Justin Jefferson 5-yard pass from Kirk Cousins (Greg Joseph kick), 9:17. Vikings 7–0. **Drive: 10 plays, 78 yards, 5:43.**

**Second quarter**

- MIN – Greg Joseph 28-yard field goal, 3:54. Vikings 10–0. **Drive: 8 plays, 89 yards, 4:04.**
- MIN – Justin Jefferson 36-yard pass from Kirk Cousins (Greg Joseph kick), 0:35. Vikings 17–0. **Drive: 7 plays, 74 yards, 2:23.**

**Third quarter**

- MIN – Greg Joseph 56-yard field goal, 9:46. Vikings 20–0. **Drive: 4 plays, −5 yards, 2:20.**
- GB – A. J. Dillon 2-yard run (Mason Crosby kick), 5:16. Vikings 20–7. **Drive: 7 plays, 75 yards, 4:30.**

**Fourth quarter**

- MIN – Greg Joseph 29-yard field goal, 6:48. Vikings 23–7. **Drive: 12 plays, 74 yards, 5:04.**

**Top passers**

- GB – Aaron Rodgers – 22/34, 195 yards, INT
- MIN – Kirk Cousins – 23/32, 277 yards, 2 TD

**Top rushers**

- GB – Aaron Jones – 5 rushes, 49 yards
- MIN – Dalvin Cook – 20 rushes, 90 yards

**Top receivers**

- GB – A. J. Dillon – 5 receptions, 46 yards
- MIN – Justin Jefferson – 9 receptions, 184 yards, 2 TD

==== Week 2: at Philadelphia Eagles ====
Week 2: Minnesota Vikings at Philadelphia Eagles – Game summary

Quarter	1	2	3	4	Total
Vikings	0	7	0	0	**7**
**Eagles**	7	17	0	0	**24**

at Lincoln Financial Field, Philadelphia, Pennsylvania

- Date: September 19
- Game time: 8:30 p.m. EDT/7:30 p.m. CDT
- Game weather: Cloudy, 76 °F (24 °C)
- Game attendance: 69,879
- Referee: Scott Novak (1)
- TV announcers (ABC): Joe Buck, Troy Aikman and Lisa Salters
- Recap, Game Book

Game information

**First quarter**

- PHI – Jalen Hurts 3-yard run (Jake Elliott kick), 9:09. Eagles 7–0. **Drive: 11 plays, 82 yards, 5:51.**

**Second quarter**

- PHI – Quez Watkins 53-yard pass from Jalen Hurts (Jake Elliott kick), 14:52. Eagles 14–0. **Drive: 7 plays, 82 yards, 3:27.**
- MIN – Irv Smith Jr. 2-yard pass from Kirk Cousins (Greg Joseph kick), 9:39. Eagles 14–7. **Drive: 9 plays, 75 yards, 5:13.**
- PHI – Jalen Hurts 26-yard run (Jake Elliott kick), 1:58. Eagles 21–7. **Drive: 7 plays, 85 yards, 3:02.**
- PHI – Jake Elliott 38-yard field goal, 0:00. Eagles 24–7. **Drive: 8 plays, 75 yards, 1:21.**

**Third quarter**

- No scoring plays.

**Fourth quarter**

- No scoring plays.

**Top passers**

- MIN – Kirk Cousins – 27/46, 221 yards, TD, 3 INT
- PHI – Jalen Hurts – 26/31, 333 yards, TD, INT

**Top rushers**

- MIN – Kirk Cousins – 2 rushes, 20 yards
- PHI – Miles Sanders – 17 rushes, 80 yards

**Top receivers**

- MIN – Adam Thielen – 4 receptions, 52 yards
- PHI – Dallas Goedert – 5 receptions, 82 yards

==== Week 3: vs. Detroit Lions ====
Week 3: Detroit Lions at Minnesota Vikings – Game summary

Quarter	1	2	3	4	Total
Lions	7	7	10	0	**24**
**Vikings**	0	14	0	14	**28**

at U.S. Bank Stadium, Minneapolis, Minnesota

- Date: September 25
- Game time: 12:00 p.m. CDT
- Game weather: None (indoor stadium)
- Game attendance: 66,638
- Referee: John Hussey (35)
- TV announcers (Fox): Brandon Gaudin, Brady Quinn and Megan Olivi
- Recap, Game Book

Game information

**First quarter**

- DET – Jamaal Williams 2-yard run (Austin Seibert kick), 6:44. Lions 7–0. **Drive: 6 plays, 54 yards, 2:36.**

**Second quarter**

- DET – T. J. Hockenson 5-yard pass from Jared Goff (Austin Seibert kick), 13:38. Lions 14–0. **Drive: 12 plays, 70 yards, 5:28.**
- MIN – Adam Thielen 1-yard pass from Kirk Cousins (Greg Joseph kick), 8:50. Lions 14–7. **Drive: 11 plays, 80 yards, 4:48.**
- MIN – Dalvin Cook 4-yard run (Greg Joseph kick), 1:12. Tied 14–14. **Drive: 9 plays, 49 yards, 3:46.**

**Third quarter**

- DET – Austin Seibert 40-yard field goal, 8:36. Lions 17–14. **Drive: 10 plays, 46 yards, 5:22.**
- DET – Jamaal Williams 13-yard run (Austin Seibert kick), 2:08. Lions 24–14. **Drive: 5 plays, 54 yards, 2:38.**

**Fourth quarter**

- MIN – Alexander Mattison 6-yard run (Greg Joseph kick), 7:50. Lions 24–21. **Drive: 6 plays, 57 yards, 2:49.**
- MIN – K. J. Osborn 28-yard pass from Kirk Cousins (Greg Joseph kick), 0:45. Vikings 28–24. **Drive: 3 plays, 56 yards, 0:25.**

**Top passers**

- DET – Jared Goff – 25/41, 277 yards, TD, INT
- MIN – Kirk Cousins – 24/41, 260 yards, 2 TD

**Top rushers**

- DET – Jamaal Williams – 20 rushes, 87 yards, 2 TD
- MIN – Dalvin Cook – 17 rushes, 96 yards, TD

**Top receivers**

- DET – Josh Reynolds – 6 receptions, 96 yards
- MIN – K. J. Osborn – 5 receptions, 73 yards, TD

==== Week 4: at New Orleans Saints ====
NFL London Games

Week 4: Minnesota Vikings at New Orleans Saints – Game summary

Quarter	1	2	3	4	Total
**Vikings**	7	6	3	12	**28**
Saints	0	7	7	11	**25**

at Tottenham Hotspur Stadium, London, United Kingdom

- Date: October 2
- Game time: 2:30 p.m. BST/8:30 a.m. CDT
- Game weather: Partly cloudy, 64 °F (18 °C)
- Game attendance: 60,639
- Referee: Clete Blakeman (34)
- TV announcers (NFLN): Kevin Kugler, Mark Sanchez, Laura Okmin and Stacey Dales
- Recap, Game Book

Game information

**First quarter**

- MIN – Alexander Mattison 15-yard pass from Kirk Cousins (Greg Joseph kick), 8:12. Vikings 7–0. **Drive: 13 plays, 75 yards, 6:48.**

**Second quarter**

- NO – Chris Olave 4-yard pass from Andy Dalton (Wil Lutz kick), 8:57. Tied 7–7. **Drive: 12 plays, 60 yards, 6:13.**
- MIN – Greg Joseph 28-yard field goal, 1:04. Vikings 10–7. **Drive: 9 plays, 46 yards, 2:38.**
- MIN – Greg Joseph 36-yard field goal, 0:00. Vikings 13–7. **Drive: 4 plays, 2 yards, 0:56.**

**Third quarter**

- MIN – Greg Joseph 24-yard field goal, 9:23. Vikings 16–7. **Drive: 5 plays, 38 yards, 2:31.**
- NO – Latavius Murray 1-yard run (Wil Lutz kick), 3:49. Vikings 16–14. **Drive: 12 plays, 78 yards, 5:34.**

**Fourth quarter**

- MIN – Greg Joseph 46-yard field goal, 14:14. Vikings 19–14. **Drive: 9 plays, 28 yards, 4:35.**
- NO – Taysom Hill 2-yard run (Andy Dalton–Jarvis Landry pass), 9:29. Saints 22–19. **Drive: 9 plays, 75 yards, 4:45.**
- MIN – Justin Jefferson 3-yard run (kick failed, wide right), 4:15. Vikings 25–22. **Drive: 10 plays, 75 yards, 5:14.**
- NO – Wil Lutz 60-yard field goal, 1:51. Tied 25–25. **Drive: 8 plays, 33 yards, 2:24.**
- MIN – Greg Joseph 47-yard field goal, 0:24. Vikings 28–25. **Drive: 6 plays, 53 yards, 1:27.**

**Top passers**

- MIN – Kirk Cousins – 25/38, 273 yards, TD, INT
- NO – Andy Dalton – 20/28, 236 yards, TD

**Top rushers**

- MIN – Dalvin Cook – 20 rushes, 76 yards
- NO – Latavius Murray – 11 rushes, 57 yards, TD

**Top receivers**

- MIN – Justin Jefferson – 10 receptions, 147 yards
- NO – Chris Olave – 4 receptions, 67 yards, TD

==== Week 5: vs. Chicago Bears ====
Week 5: Chicago Bears at Minnesota Vikings – Game summary

Quarter	1	2	3	4	Total
Bears	3	7	9	3	**22**
**Vikings**	7	14	0	8	**29**

at U.S. Bank Stadium, Minneapolis, Minnesota

- Date: October 9
- Game time: 12:00 p.m. CDT
- Game weather: None (indoor stadium)
- Game attendance: 66,929
- Referee: Shawn Hochuli (83)
- TV announcers (Fox): Adam Amin, Mark Schlereth and Kristina Pink
- Recap, Game Book

Game information

**First quarter**

- MIN – Dalvin Cook 1-yard run (Greg Joseph kick), 8:15. Vikings 7–0. **Drive: 12 plays, 86 yards, 6:45.**
- CHI – Cairo Santos 50-yard field goal, 6:06. Vikings 7–3. **Drive: 6 plays, 44 yards, 2:09.**

**Second quarter**

- MIN – Dalvin Cook 5-yard run (Greg Joseph kick), 14:55. Vikings 14–3. **Drive: 11 plays, 75 yards, 6:11.**
- MIN – Jalen Reagor 1-yard pass from Kirk Cousins (Greg Joseph kick), 7:20. Vikings 21–3. **Drive: 9 plays, 71 yards, 6:17.**
- CHI – David Montgomery 9-yard run (Cairo Santos kick), 1:08. Vikings 21–10. **Drive: 4 plays, 50 yards, 0:46.**

**Third quarter**

- CHI – Velus Jones Jr. 9-yard pass from Justin Fields (pass failed), 10:24. Vikings 21–16. **Drive: 8 plays, 67 yards, 4:36.**
- CHI – Cairo Santos 43-yard field goal, 1:05. Vikings 21–19. **Drive: 11 plays, 34 yards, 6:29.**

**Fourth quarter**

- CHI – Cairo Santos 51-yard field goal, 9:26. Bears 22–21. **Drive: 7 plays, 19 yards, 3:18.**
- MIN – Kirk Cousins 1-yard run (Kirk Cousins–Justin Jefferson pass), 2:26. Vikings 29–22. **Drive: 17 plays, 75 yards, 7:00.**

**Top passers**

- CHI – Justin Fields – 15/21, 208 yards, TD
- MIN – Kirk Cousins – 32/41, 296 yards, TD, INT

**Top rushers**

- CHI – Justin Fields – 8 rushes, 47 yards
- MIN – Dalvin Cook – 18 rushes, 94 yards, 2 TD

**Top receivers**

- CHI – David Montgomery – 4 receptions, 62 yards
- MIN – Justin Jefferson – 12 receptions, 154 yards

==== Week 6: at Miami Dolphins ====
Week 6: Minnesota Vikings at Miami Dolphins – Game summary

Quarter	1	2	3	4	Total
**Vikings**	0	10	0	14	**24**
Dolphins	0	3	0	13	**16**

at Hard Rock Stadium, Miami Gardens, Florida

- Date: October 16
- Game time: 1:00 p.m. EDT/12:00 p.m. CDT
- Game weather: Partly cloudy, 86 °F (30 °C)
- Game attendance: 66,100
- Referee: Brad Rogers (126)
- TV announcers (Fox): Kenny Albert, Jonathan Vilma and Shannon Spake
- Recap, Game Book

Game information

**First quarter**

- No scoring plays.

**Second quarter**

- MIA – Jason Sanders 44-yard field goal, 6:05. Dolphins 3–0. **Drive: 9 plays, 36 yards, 5:33.**
- MIN – Irv Smith Jr. 1-yard pass from Kirk Cousins (Greg Joseph kick), 2:32. Vikings 7–3. **Drive: 7 plays, 75 yards, 3:33.**
- MIN – Greg Joseph 34-yard field goal, 0:00. Vikings 10–3. **Drive: 3 plays, 26 yards, 0:18.**

**Third quarter**

- No scoring plays.

**Fourth quarter**

- MIN – Adam Thielen 2-yard pass from Kirk Cousins (kick failed, wide right), 14:13. Vikings 16–3. **Drive: 7 plays, 73 yards, 4:09.**
- MIA – Mike Gesicki 4-yard pass from Teddy Bridgewater (Jason Sanders kick), 10:04. Vikings 16–10. **Drive: 7 plays, 75 yards, 4:09.**
- MIN – Dalvin Cook 53-yard run (Kirk Cousins–Adam Thielen pass), 3:15. Vikings 24–10. **Drive: 2 plays, 59 yards, 0:55.**
- MIA – Mike Gesicki 3-yard pass from Teddy Bridgewater (pass failed), 1:24. Vikings 24–16. **Drive: 6 plays, 83 yards, 1:13.**

**Top passers**

- MIN – Kirk Cousins – 20/30, 175 yards, 2 TD
- MIA – Teddy Bridgewater – 23/34, 329 yards, 2 TD, 2 INT

**Top rushers**

- MIN – Dalvin Cook – 13 rushes, 77 yards, TD
- MIA – Raheem Mostert – 14 rushes, 49 yards

**Top receivers**

- MIN – Justin Jefferson – 6 receptions, 107 yards
- MIA – Tyreek Hill – 12 receptions, 177 yards

==== Week 8: vs. Arizona Cardinals ====
Week 8: Arizona Cardinals at Minnesota Vikings – Game summary

Quarter	1	2	3	4	Total
Cardinals	3	7	13	3	**26**
**Vikings**	7	7	14	6	**34**

at U.S. Bank Stadium, Minneapolis, Minnesota

- Date: October 30
- Game time: 12:00 p.m. CDT
- Game weather: None (indoor stadium)
- Game attendance: 66,742
- Referee: Brad Allen (122)
- TV announcers (Fox): Chris Myers, Mark Schlereth and Kristina Pink
- Recap, Game Book

Game information

**First quarter**

- MIN – Kirk Cousins 17-yard run (Greg Joseph kick), 10:12. Vikings 7–0. **Drive: 10 plays, 75 yards, 4:48.**
- ARI – Matt Prater 44-yard field goal, 6:04. Vikings 7–3. **Drive: 8 plays, 49 yards, 4:08.**

**Second quarter**

- MIN – Johnny Mundt 1-yard pass from Kirk Cousins (Greg Joseph kick), 9:54. Vikings 14–3. **Drive: 9 plays, 83 yards, 5:00.**
- ARI – DeAndre Hopkins 6-yard pass from Kyler Murray (Matt Prater kick), 0:47. Vikings 14–10. **Drive: 10 plays, 72 yards, 2:52.**

**Third quarter**

- ARI – Zach Ertz 8-yard pass from Kyler Murray (Matt Prater kick), 9:01. Cardinals 17–14. **Drive: 5 plays, 52 yards, 2:14.**
- MIN – Alexander Mattison 7-yard run (Greg Joseph kick), 5:47. Vikings 21–17. **Drive: 8 plays, 75 yards, 3:14.**
- MIN – Dalvin Cook 4-yard run (Greg Joseph kick), 4:07. Vikings 28–17. **Drive: 4 plays, 31 yards, 1:20.**
- ARI – Rondale Moore 38-yard pass from Kyler Murray (pass failed), 2:27. Vikings 28–23. **Drive: 4 plays, 70 yards, 1:40.**

**Fourth quarter**

- ARI – Matt Prater 34-yard field goal, 12:32. Vikings 28–26. **Drive: 7 plays, 8 yards, 3:27.**
- MIN – K. J. Osborn 5-yard pass from Kirk Cousins (kick failed, hit left upright), 8:36. Vikings 34–26. **Drive: 4 plays, 25 yards, 1:58.**

**Top passers**

- ARI – Kyler Murray – 31/44, 326 yards, 3 TD, 2 INT
- MIN – Kirk Cousins – 24/36, 232 yards, 2 TD

**Top rushers**

- ARI – Kyler Murray – 6 rushes, 36 yards
- MIN – Dalvin Cook – 20 rushes, 111 yards, TD

**Top receivers**

- ARI – DeAndre Hopkins – 12 receptions, 159 yards, TD
- MIN – Justin Jefferson – 6 receptions, 98 yards

During this game, Jared Allen was inducted into the Vikings' Ring of Honor.

==== Week 9: at Washington Commanders ====
Week 9: Minnesota Vikings at Washington Commanders – Game summary

Quarter	1	2	3	4	Total
**Vikings**	7	0	0	13	**20**
Commanders	0	3	7	7	**17**

at FedExField, Landover, Maryland

- Date: November 6
- Game time: 1:00 p.m. EST/12:00 p.m. CST
- Game weather: Cloudy, 76 °F (24 °C)
- Game attendance: 58,651
- Referee: Jerome Boger (23)
- TV announcers (Fox): Adam Amin, Mark Schlereth and Kristina Pink
- Recap, Game Book

Game information

**First quarter**

- MIN – Justin Jefferson 9-yard pass from Kirk Cousins (Greg Joseph kick), 9:17. Vikings 7–0. **Drive: 9 plays, 78 yards, 5:43.**

**Second quarter**

- WAS – Joey Slye 44-yard field goal, 0:37. Vikings 7–3. **Drive: 11 plays, 37 yards, 2:07.**

**Third quarter**

- WAS – Curtis Samuel 49-yard pass from Taylor Heinicke (Joey Slye kick), 14:01. Commanders 10–7. **Drive: 2 plays, 52 yards, 0:59.**

**Fourth quarter**

- WAS – Dax Milne 6-yard pass from Taylor Heinicke (Joey Slye kick), 14:14. Commanders 17–7. **Drive: 10 plays, 78 yards, 5:18.**
- MIN – Greg Joseph 25-yard field goal, 10:46. Commanders 17–10. **Drive: 9 plays, 68 yards, 3:28.**
- MIN – Dalvin Cook 12-yard pass from Kirk Cousins (Greg Joseph kick), 7:46. Tied 17–17. **Drive: 2 plays, 12 yards, 0:10.**
- MIN – Greg Joseph 28-yard field goal, 0:12. Vikings 20–17. **Drive: 15 plays, 44 yards, 6:00.**

**Top passers**

- MIN – Kirk Cousins – 22/40, 265 yards, 2 TD, INT
- WAS – Taylor Heinicke – 15/28, 149 yards, 2 TD, INT

**Top rushers**

- MIN – Dalvin Cook – 17 rushes, 47 yards
- WAS – Brian Robinson Jr. – 13 rushes, 44 yards

**Top receivers**

- MIN – Justin Jefferson – 7 receptions, 115 yards, TD
- WAS – Curtis Samuel – 3 receptions, 65 yards, TD

==== Week 10: at Buffalo Bills ====
Week 10: Minnesota Vikings at Buffalo Bills – Game summary

Quarter	1	2	3	4	OT	Total
**Vikings**	7	3	7	13	3	**33**
Bills	14	10	3	3	0	**30**

at Highmark Stadium, Orchard Park, New York

- Date: November 13
- Game time: 1:00 p.m. EST/12:00 p.m. CST
- Game weather: Cloudy, 38 °F (3 °C)
- Game attendance: 70,844
- Referee: Craig Wrolstad (4)
- TV announcers (Fox): Joe Davis, Daryl Johnston and Pam Oliver
- Recap, Game Book

Game information

**First quarter**

- MIN – Justin Jefferson 22-yard pass from Kirk Cousins (Greg Joseph kick), 10:13. Vikings 7–0. **Drive: 6 plays, 74 yards, 2:54.**
- BUF – Devin Singletary 5-yard run (Tyler Bass kick), 8:10. Tied 7–7. **Drive: 4 plays, 47 yards, 2:03.**
- BUF – Devin Singletary 1-yard run (Tyler Bass kick), 1:04. Bills 14–7. **Drive: 10 plays, 70 yards, 5:09.**

**Second quarter**

- BUF – Tyler Bass 34-yard field goal, 12:53. Bills 17–7. **Drive: 7 plays, 12 yards, 2:25.**
- MIN – Greg Joseph 27-yard field goal, 7:12. Bills 17–10. **Drive: 12 plays, 46 yards, 5:41.**
- BUF – Gabe Davis 11-yard pass from Josh Allen (Tyler Bass kick), 0:28. Bills 24–10. **Drive: 5 plays, 71 yards, 1:22.**

**Third quarter**

- BUF – Tyler Bass 45-yard field goal, 1:51. Bills 27–10. **Drive: 8 plays, 46 yards, 4:21.**
- MIN – Dalvin Cook 81-yard run (Greg Joseph kick), 1:34. Bills 27–17. **Drive: 1 play, 81 yards, 0:17.**

**Fourth quarter**

- MIN – C. J. Ham 3-yard run (kick failed, hit right upright), 4:34. Bills 27–23. **Drive: 13 plays, 66 yards, 5:53.**
- MIN – Eric Kendricks fumble recovery in the end zone (Greg Joseph kick), 0:41. Vikings 30–27.
- BUF – Tyler Bass 29-yard field goal, 0:02. Tied 30–30. **Drive: 5 plays, 69 yards, 0:39.**

**Overtime**

- MIN – Greg Joseph 33-yard field goal, 3:42. Vikings 33–30. **Drive: 12 plays, 60 yards, 6:18.**

**Top passers**

- MIN – Kirk Cousins – 30/50, 357 yards, TD, 2 INT
- BUF – Josh Allen – 29/43, 330 yards, TD, 2 INT

**Top rushers**

- MIN – Dalvin Cook – 14 rushes, 119 yards, TD
- BUF – Josh Allen – 6 rushes, 84 yards

**Top receivers**

- MIN – Justin Jefferson – 10 receptions, 193 yards, TD
- BUF – Stefon Diggs – 12 receptions, 128 yards

In Week 10 against the Buffalo Bills, after forcing a quick three-and-out, the Vikings took an early lead on a 22-yard pass from Kirk Cousins to Justin Jefferson; however, following a big kick return, the Bills responded immediately, as Devin Singletary ran it in from five yards. The Vikings punted on the ensuing possession, allowing the Bills to take the lead on another Singletary run, this time from one yard. Cousins then threw an interception, but this time the defense was able to hold Buffalo to a field goal, keeping the score at 17–7 as the game ticked into the second quarter. The Vikings then drove down to the Bills' 2-yard line, but a tackle for loss on Alexander Mattison, followed by an offensive pass interference call against T. J. Hockenson meant they had to settle for a field goal. Just as the Bills were looking like going on another scoring drive, the ball was punched out of Singletary's hands and returned 40 yards by Camryn Bynum. Midway inside the Buffalo half at the two-minute warning, the Vikings were faced with a 3rd-and-1 situation, but were unable to convert on successive passes from Cousins to Jefferson and then K. J. Osborn, resulting in a turnover on downs. A long run from Josh Allen then set up the Bills for another scoring drive, culminating in an 11-yard touchdown pass from Allen to Gabe Davis. The Vikings had to punt on the following drive, which meant the Bills took a 24–10 lead into the interval.

The Vikings began the second half with the ball, but after big gains by Jefferson and Dalvin Cook, Cousins threw an interception to Dane Jackson. The Bills managed to get the ball into Vikings territory on the next drive, but a 13-yard sack on Allen by Za'Darius Smith pushed them back into their own territory, forcing a punt. Despite gains by Hockenson and Osborn, though, the Vikings were also forced into kicking the ball away. Gains from former Viking Stefon Diggs and Dawson Knox then set up a 45-yard field goal for the Bills; however, on the Vikings' next play from scrimmage, Cook ran 81 yards for a touchdown, cutting the deficit to 10 points. On the Bills' next possession, following a spectacular, one-handed catch from Diggs on 3rd-and-15 to keep the drive going as the third quarter ended, Allen combined with Davis and Diggs again to get into the red zone; however, attempting to find Knox in the end zone, Allen then threw an interception to Patrick Peterson, who returned it 39 yards to the Vikings' 34-yard line. On the ensuing possession, the Vikings worked the ball downfield and made it into the red zone on a 21-yard catch by Adam Thielen, before Cousins took it down to the 3-yard line on a 15-yard scramble. Following an incompletion to Jefferson, fullback C. J. Ham ran the ball into the end zone, only for Greg Joseph to hit the upright with the extra point, leaving the Vikings down 27–23. The Vikings defense then prevented the Bills from making a first down, giving them the ball back with 3:28 left in the fourth quarter.

The Vikings were soon faced with a 4th-and-18 situation going into the two-minute warning, only for Cousins to complete a 32-yard pass to Jefferson, who caught it one-handed between the hands of the defender, Cam Lewis, getting them into Bills territory. A 9-yard completion to Thielen followed, which had 15 yards added to it for an unnecessary roughness penalty against Christian Benford for the Bills. Jefferson was again the target on the next play, a 14-yard completion getting the Vikings down to the 3-yard line. A slip by Cousins on the next play backed the Vikings up three yards, but another completion to Jefferson on 3rd-and-goal saw him roll into the end zone. The play was originally ruled a touchdown, but a booth review meant he was ruled down at the 1-yard line. With the Vikings facing fourth down, Cousins attempted to find Cook in the flat, only for the ball to fall incomplete; however, the Vikings were given a reprieve by a defensive offside penalty. With the ball less than a foot from the goal line, Cousins attempted to sneak it in himself, but he was stopped short and the Vikings turned it over on downs; however, on the next play, the Bills fumbled the snap and Vikings linebacker Eric Kendricks pounced on it in the end zone for a touchdown. Joseph kicked the extra point to put the Vikings up by three points with 41 seconds left. The Bills had no timeouts, but they were able to make their way downfield with completions to Knox, Davis and Isaiah McKenzie, who were all able to get out of bounds to stop the clock. Allen took a deep shot to Gabe Davis on the next play that fell incomplete, but the officials deemed Andrew Booth Jr. to have committed a pass interference penalty, getting the Bills to the Vikings' 11-yard line with 5 seconds to play. With not enough time for a shot to the end zone, the Bills settled for the game-tying field goal, which Tyler Bass converted.

In overtime, the Vikings won the toss and received the ball first. They made their way down to the Bills' 2-yard line thanks to big gains from Cook on the ground and Jefferson through the air, as well as a defensive pass interference penalty against Benford; however, a loss of yardage on a Cook run, followed by a Cousins sack and an incompletion to Thielen meant the Vikings had to settle for a field goal with 3:45 left in the additional period. The Bills quickly made their way into Vikings territory thanks to runs by Allen, and back-to-back seven-yard catches by Diggs got them comfortably into field goal range. On the edge of the red zone, Allen took a shot to the end zone but the pass intended for Knox was broken up by Duke Shelley. Allen went back to the end zone on the next play with a pass intended for Davis, but it was again intercepted by Peterson, giving the Vikings the win to take them to 8–1 for the first time since 2009.

==== Week 11: vs. Dallas Cowboys ====
Week 11: Dallas Cowboys at Minnesota Vikings – Game summary

Quarter	1	2	3	4	Total
**Cowboys**	10	13	14	3	**40**
Vikings	3	0	0	0	**3**

at U.S. Bank Stadium, Minneapolis, Minnesota

- Date: November 20
- Game time: 3:25 p.m. CST
- Game weather: None (indoor stadium)
- Game attendance: 65,304
- Referee: Clay Martin (19)
- TV announcers (CBS): Jim Nantz, Tony Romo and Tracy Wolfson
- Recap, Game Book

Game information

**First quarter**

- DAL – Brett Maher 27-yard field goal, 10:22. Cowboys 3–0. **Drive: 7 plays, 18 yards, 3:22.**
- MIN – Greg Joseph 25-yard field goal, 6:39. Tied 3–3. **Drive: 10 plays, 69 yards, 3:43.**
- DAL – Ezekiel Elliott 1-yard run (Brett Maher kick), 1:26. Cowboys 10–3. **Drive: 10 plays, 75 yards, 5:13.**

**Second quarter**

- DAL – Brett Maher 53-yard field goal, 5:31. Cowboys 13–3. **Drive: 14 plays, 48 yards, 7:54.**
- DAL – Tony Pollard 30-yard pass from Dak Prescott (Brett Maher kick), 1:43. Cowboys 20–3. **Drive: 8 plays, 59 yards, 2:44.**
- DAL – Brett Maher 60-yard field goal, 0:00. Cowboys 23–3. **Drive: 5 plays, 44 yards, 0:31.**

**Third quarter**

- DAL – Tony Pollard 68-yard pass from Dak Prescott (Brett Maher kick), 12:32. Cowboys 30–3. **Drive: 5 plays, 75 yards, 2:28.**
- DAL – Ezekiel Elliott 1-yard run (Brett Maher kick), 8:15. Cowboys 37–3. **Drive: 5 plays, 41 yards, 1:54.**

**Fourth quarter**

- DAL – Brett Maher 50-yard field goal, 10:04. Cowboys 40–3. **Drive: 9 plays, 44 yards, 6:05.**

**Top passers**

- DAL – Dak Prescott – 22/25, 276 yards, 2 TD
- MIN – Kirk Cousins – 12/23, 105 yards

**Top rushers**

- DAL – Tony Pollard – 15 rushes, 80 yards
- MIN – Dalvin Cook – 11 rushes, 72 yards

**Top receivers**

- DAL – Tony Pollard – 6 receptions, 109 yards, 2 TD
- MIN – T. J. Hockenson – 5 receptions, 34 yards

==== Week 12: vs. New England Patriots ====
Week 12: New England Patriots at Minnesota Vikings – Game summary

Quarter	1	2	3	4	Total
Patriots	10	6	10	0	**26**
**Vikings**	7	9	7	10	**33**

at U.S. Bank Stadium, Minneapolis, Minnesota

- Date: November 24
- Game time: 7:20 p.m. CST
- Game weather: None (indoor stadium)
- Game attendance: 66,918
- Referee: Alex Kemp (55)
- TV announcers (NBC): Mike Tirico, Tony Dungy, Jason Garrett and Melissa Stark
- Recap, Game Book

Game information

**First quarter**

- MIN – Justin Jefferson 6-yard pass from Kirk Cousins (Greg Joseph kick), 10:40. Vikings 7–0. **Drive: 8 plays, 80 yards, 4:20.**
- NE – Nelson Agholor 34-yard pass from Mac Jones (Nick Folk kick), 8:21. Tied 7–7. **Drive: 5 plays, 75 yards, 2:19.**
- NE – Nick Folk 34-yard field goal, 1:28. Patriots 10–7. **Drive: 4 plays, 1 yard, 2:00.**

**Second quarter**

- MIN – Greg Joseph 30-yard field goal, 8:29. Tied 10–10. **Drive: 14 plays, 72 yards, 7:59.**
- NE – Nick Folk 46-yard field goal, 5:41. Patriots 13–10. **Drive: 5 plays, 23 yards, 2:48.**
- MIN – T. J. Hockenson 1-yard pass from Kirk Cousins (kick failed, wide right), 1:30. Vikings 16–13. **Drive: 9 plays, 75 yards, 4:11.**
- NE – Nick Folk 23-yard field goal, 0:03. Tied 16–16. **Drive: 9 plays, 70 yards, 1:27.**

**Third quarter**

- NE – Hunter Henry 37-yard pass from Mac Jones (Nick Folk kick), 10:54. Patriots 23–16. **Drive: 8 plays, 75 yards, 4:06.**
- MIN – Kene Nwangwu 97-yard kickoff return (Greg Joseph kick), 10:41. Tied 23–23. **Drive: 0 plays, 0 yards, 0:13.**
- NE – Nick Folk 25-yard field goal, 6:43. Patriots 26–23. **Drive: 9 plays, 69 yards, 3:58.**

**Fourth quarter**

- MIN – Greg Joseph 36-yard field goal, 14:07. Tied 26–26. **Drive: 14 plays, 65 yards, 7:36.**
- MIN – Adam Thielen 15-yard pass from Kirk Cousins (Greg Joseph kick), 9:34. Vikings 33–26. **Drive: 6 plays, 71 yards, 3:32.**

**Top passers**

- NE – Mac Jones – 28/39, 382 yards, 2 TD
- MIN – Kirk Cousins – 30/37, 299 yards, 3 TD, INT

**Top rushers**

- NE – Rhamondre Stevenson – 7 rushes, 36 yards
- MIN – Dalvin Cook – 22 rushes, 42 yards

**Top receivers**

- NE – DeVante Parker – 4 receptions, 80 yards
- MIN – Justin Jefferson – 9 receptions, 139 yards, TD

With their first win over New England since 2000, the Vikings improved to 9–2.

==== Week 13: vs. New York Jets ====
Week 13: New York Jets at Minnesota Vikings – Game summary

Quarter	1	2	3	4	Total
Jets	3	3	6	10	**22**
**Vikings**	3	17	0	7	**27**

at U.S. Bank Stadium, Minneapolis, Minnesota

- Date: December 4
- Game time: 12:00 p.m. CST
- Game weather: None (indoor stadium)
- Game attendance: 66,973
- Referee: Clete Blakeman (34)
- TV announcers (CBS): Ian Eagle, Charles Davis and Evan Washburn
- Recap, Game Book

Game information

**First quarter**

- MIN – Greg Joseph 51-yard field goal, 12:33. Vikings 3–0. **Drive: 4 plays, 1 yard, 0:52.**
- NYJ – Greg Zuerlein 48-yard field goal, 8:30. Tied 3–3. **Drive: 12 plays, 45 yards, 4:03.**

**Second quarter**

- MIN – Dalvin Cook 4-yard run (Greg Joseph kick), 13:02. Vikings 10–3. **Drive: 14 plays, 74 yards, 6:58.**
- MIN – Alexander Mattison 14-yard run (Greg Joseph kick), 3:35. Vikings 17–3. **Drive: 11 plays, 86 yards, 6:15.**
- MIN – Greg Joseph 41-yard field goal, 0:40. Vikings 20–3. **Drive: 7 plays, 20 yards, 1:18.**
- NYJ – Greg Zuerlein 60-yard field goal, 0:08. Vikings 20–6. **Drive: 6 plays, 33 yards, 0:32.**

**Third quarter**

- NYJ – Greg Zuerlein 36-yard field goal, 9:43. Vikings 20–9. **Drive: 8 plays, 43 yards, 3:13.**
- NYJ – Greg Zuerlein 30-yard field goal, 0:59. Vikings 20–12. **Drive: 12 plays, 62 yards, 6:17.**

**Fourth quarter**

- NYJ – Greg Zuerlein 26-yard field goal, 12:30. Vikings 20–15. **Drive: 5 plays, 63 yards, 2:16.**
- MIN – Justin Jefferson 10-yard pass from Kirk Cousins (Greg Joseph kick), 8:33. Vikings 27–15. **Drive: 7 plays, 75 yards, 3:57.**
- NYJ – Mike White 1-yard run (Greg Zuerlein kick), 6:45. Vikings 27–22. **Drive: 5 plays, 75 yards, 1:48.**

**Top passers**

- NYJ – Mike White – 31/57, 369 yards, 2 INT
- MIN – Kirk Cousins – 21/35, 173 yards, TD

**Top rushers**

- NYJ – Zonovan Knight – 15 rushes, 90 yards
- MIN – Dalvin Cook – 20 rushes, 86 yards, TD

**Top receivers**

- NYJ – Garrett Wilson – 8 receptions, 162 yards
- MIN – Justin Jefferson – 7 receptions, 45 yards, TD

==== Week 14: at Detroit Lions ====
Week 14: Minnesota Vikings at Detroit Lions – Game summary

Quarter	1	2	3	4	Total
Vikings	7	0	6	10	**23**
**Lions**	7	7	7	13	**34**

at Ford Field, Detroit, Michigan

- Date: December 11
- Game time: 1:00 p.m. EST/12:00 p.m. CST
- Game weather: None (indoor stadium)
- Game attendance: 66,374
- Referee: Ronald Torbert (62)
- TV announcers (Fox): Kenny Albert, Jonathan Vilma and Shannon Spake
- Recap, Game Book

Game information

**First quarter**

- DET – Jameson Williams 41-yard pass from Jared Goff (Michael Badgley kick), 10:27. Lions 7–0. **Drive: 2 plays, 46 yards, 0:51.**
- MIN – Dalvin Cook 1-yard run (Greg Joseph kick), 4:02. Tied 7–7. **Drive: 10 plays, 75 yards, 6:25.**

**Second quarter**

- DET – D. J. Chark 48-yard pass from Jared Goff (Michael Badgley kick), 6:34. Lions 14–7. **Drive: 1 play, 48 yards, 0:08.**

**Third quarter**

- DET – Josh Reynolds 5-yard pass from Jared Goff (Michael Badgley kick), 5:44. Lions 21–7. **Drive: 12 plays, 76 yards, 7:04.**
- MIN – Adam Thielen 23-yard pass from Kirk Cousins (pass failed), 2:17. Lions 21–13. **Drive: 7 plays, 75 yards, 3:27.**

**Fourth quarter**

- DET – Justin Jackson 15-yard run (Michael Badgley kick), 13:28. Lions 28–13. **Drive: 10 plays, 75 yards, 3:49.**
- MIN – Greg Joseph 41-yard field goal, 10:47. Lions 28–16. **Drive: 7 plays, 52 yards, 2:41.**
- DET – Michael Badgley 41-yard field goal, 4:06. Lions 31–16. **Drive: 12 plays, 52 yards, 6:41.**
- MIN – K. J. Osborn 15-yard pass from Kirk Cousins (Greg Joseph kick), 2:50. Lions 31–23. **Drive: 6 plays, 75 yards, 1:16.**
- DET – Michael Badgley 48-yard field goal, 0:17. Lions 34–23. **Drive: 7 plays, 14 yards, 2:33.**

**Top passers**

- MIN – Kirk Cousins – 31/41, 425 yards, 2 TD
- DET – Jared Goff – 27/39, 330 yards, 3 TD

**Top rushers**

- MIN – Dalvin Cook – 15 rushes, 23 yards, TD
- DET – C. J. Moore – 1 rush, 42 yards

**Top receivers**

- MIN – Justin Jefferson – 11 receptions, 223 yards
- DET – D. J. Chark – 6 receptions, 94 yards, TD

==== Week 15: vs. Indianapolis Colts ====
Week 15: Indianapolis Colts at Minnesota Vikings – Game summary

Quarter	1	2	3	4	OT	Total
Colts	17	16	3	0	0	**36**
**Vikings**	0	0	14	22	3	**39**

at U.S. Bank Stadium, Minneapolis, Minnesota

- Date: December 17
- Game time: 12:00 p.m. CST
- Game weather: None (indoor stadium)
- Game attendance: 66,801
- Referee: Tra Blake (3)
- TV announcers (NFLN): Noah Eagle, Nate Burleson, Tom Pelissero and Lindsay Czarniak
- Recap, Game Book

Game information

**First quarter**

- IND – Chase McLaughlin 26-yard field goal, 9:11. Colts 3–0. **Drive: 11 plays, 44 yards, 5:49.**
- IND – JoJo Domann 24-yard return of blocked punt (Chase McLaughlin kick), 8:12. Colts 10–0.
- IND – Deon Jackson 1-yard pass from Matt Ryan (Chase McLaughlin kick), 3:51. Colts 17–0. **Drive: 7 plays, 66 yards, 3:29.**

**Second quarter**

- IND – Chase McLaughlin 28-yard field goal, 13:07. Colts 20–0. **Drive: 6 plays, 21 yards, 3:03.**
- IND – Chase McLaughlin 49-yard field goal, 10:41. Colts 23–0. **Drive: 4 plays, 0 yards, 0:20.**
- IND – Julian Blackmon 17-yard interception return (Chase McLaughlin kick), 5:50. Colts 30–0.
- IND – Chase McLaughlin 27-yard field goal, 0:08. Colts 33–0. **Drive: 9 plays, 65 yards, 3:52.**

**Third quarter**

- MIN – K. J. Osborn 2-yard pass from Kirk Cousins (Greg Joseph kick), 8:22. Colts 33–7. **Drive: 7 plays, 88 yards, 2:54.**
- IND – Chase McLaughlin 52-yard field goal, 4:53. Colts 36–7. **Drive: 6 plays, 26 yards, 3:29.**
- MIN – C. J. Ham 1-yard run (Greg Joseph kick), 1:13. Colts 36–14. **Drive: 8 plays, 75 yards, 3:40.**

**Fourth quarter**

- MIN – Justin Jefferson 8-yard pass from Kirk Cousins (Greg Joseph kick), 12:53. Colts 36–21. **Drive: 6 plays, 61 yards, 2:14.**
- MIN – Adam Thielen 1-yard pass from Kirk Cousins (Greg Joseph kick), 5:30. Colts 36–28. **Drive: 5 plays, 50 yards, 1:36.**
- MIN – Dalvin Cook 64-yard pass from Kirk Cousins (Kirk Cousins–T. J. Hockenson pass), 2:15. Tied 36–36. **Drive: 1 play, 64 yards, 0:13.**

**Overtime**

- MIN – Greg Joseph 40-yard field goal, 0:03. Vikings 39–36. **Drive: 6 plays, 60 yards, 1:38.**

**Top passers**

- IND – Matt Ryan – 19/33, 182 yards, TD
- MIN – Kirk Cousins – 34/54, 460 yards, 4 TD, 2 INT

**Top rushers**

- IND – Zack Moss – 24 rushes, 81 yards
- MIN – Dalvin Cook – 17 rushes, 95 yards

**Top receivers**

- IND – Michael Pittman Jr. – 10 receptions, 60 yards
- MIN – K. J. Osborn – 10 receptions, 157 yards, TD

The Vikings welcomed the Indianapolis Colts to U.S. Bank Stadium with a third opportunity in as many weeks to clinch the NFC North title; a win or a tie would give them the division title, but they could also afford to lose if the Lions failed to beat the Jets the next day. Despite allowing the Colts to drive down to the Vikings' 1-yard line on the opening possession, the hosts were able to push them back to the 8-yard line, forcing a 26-yard field goal from former Viking Chase McLaughlin. On the ensuing drive, the Vikings were forced to punt, but Ryan Wright's kick was blocked by Ifeadi Odenigbo, another former Viking, and returned 24 yards for a touchdown by JoJo Domann. Dalvin Cook took the opening play of the Vikings' next possession 40 yards into Colts territory, but immediately fumbled on the next play, allowing the Colts to capitalise by capping a 66-yard drive with a 1-yard touchdown run from Deon Jackson. On the Vikings' next drive, they were stopped on 3rd-and-1 and attempted to go for it on 4th down, only to be stopped again, giving the Colts the ball in Vikings territory.

As the game entered the second quarter, the Vikings' defense stood firm, forcing the Colts to kick a field goal. The Vikings were faced with another 4th-and-1 and set up to punt, only for Wright to toss the ball in the direction of Jalen Nailor; however, it fell incomplete and the Vikings turned the ball over on downs again, allowing the Colts to kick another field goal, this time from 49 yards. The two teams then exchanged punts before Vikings quarterback Kirk Cousins threw an interception deep in his own territory that Julian Blackmon returned 17 yards for a touchdown. The Vikings thought they had managed to ignite their offense on the next possession, but a 40-yard completion to K. J. Osborn was overturned after the Colts challenged the play. The Vikings eventually had to punt, and with four minutes left in the half, the Colts drove the ball downfield and kicked a 27-yard field goal to go into the break up 33–0.

To start the second half, the Vikings lost yardage and were again forced to punt; however, they were able to force the Colts into their second punt of the game on the following drive. A big pass from Cousins to Osborn moved the Vikings 63 yards downfield on their next possession, putting them inside the Colts' 5-yard line; after a short gain by Cook, Cousins found Osborn in the end zone for the Vikings' first points of the game. The defense then made a stop as the Colts entered Vikings territory, limiting them to a 52-yard field goal, before the Vikings offense marched downfield to score another touchdown via a 1-yard run from fullback C. J. Ham. They then closed out the third quarter by forcing the Colts into another punt.

They opened the fourth quarter with a 20-yard completion from Cousins to Justin Jefferson, and an unnecessary roughness penalty on Rodney Thomas II added another 15 yards. Another Jefferson catch for 17 yards got the Vikings into the red zone, and the drive was capped by a third Jefferson catch for an 8-yard touchdown, reducing the deficit to 15 points. The Colts punted again on the next possession, and Jalen Reagor returned the kick 51 yards to put the Vikings on the verge of the red zone again, only for the play to be called back for a facemask penalty against Vikings cornerback Kris Boyd. The Vikings made their way downfield, helped by another unnecessary roughness penalty for a hit on Jefferson by Stephon Gilmore, only for Cousins to throw another interception when targeting Reagor on a deep route that the receiver appeared to give up on. The Colts started on their own 2-yard line, but could not capitalize on the turnover as the Vikings forced them to punt once again, and Reagor made a fair catch at midfield. Completions to Adam Thielen (his first target of the game) and Osborn, followed by a pass interference penalty in the end zone, got the Vikings down to the Colts 1-yard line, and they scored a touchdown on the third attempt, when Cousins found Thielen in the end zone. The Colts managed a first down on their next possession, but on the very next play, Jackson fumbled, and Vikings cornerback Chandon Sullivan recovered the ball and returned it for what he thought was a touchdown, only for the officials to rule Jackson to have been down by contact; Sullivan's protestations earned him a 15-yard penalty for unsportsmanlike conduct. On review, the play was confirmed as a fumble, giving the Vikings the ball, but because the officials had whistled, they could not award the touchdown. Following the penalty, the Vikings started just inside their own half, but despite Jefferson picking up a pair of 7-yard catches, the drive stalled. On 4th-and-15, Cousins attempted to run for the first down, but he was tripped and the Vikings turned the ball over on downs for a third time with 2:52 left in the quarter. The Colts moved into Vikings territory, but faced with a 4th-and-1 on the Vikings' 36-yard line, Matt Ryan was stopped short on a quarterback sneak. The Vikings used all three of their timeouts during the Colts' drive, but on the first play of the following possession, Dalvin Cook took a screen pass 64 yards downfield for a touchdown. The Vikings attempted a two-point conversion, and Cousins found T. J. Hockenson in the end zone, tying the game with 2:15 left to play. The teams then traded punts, sending the game to overtime.

The Vikings won the toss ahead of the extra period and elected to receive the ball, but their opening drive stalled following a Cousins sack and an offensive holding penalty against guard Ezra Cleveland. A 14-yard catch by Hockenson put the Vikings on the verge of Greg Joseph's field goal range, but they declined the 57-yard attempt and punted instead. The defense then forced the Colts into a punt following a short drive, leaving the Vikings on their own 18-yard line. After a 6-yard run by Cook, Cousins completed passes to Osborn, Hockenson and Jefferson to get the Vikings down to the Colts' 27-yard line with 20 seconds left to play, and a delay of game penalty against Odenigbo moved them 5 yards closer to the end zone. That presented Joseph with the opportunity for a 40-yard, game-winning field goal. Despite the Colts calling a timeout in an attempt to ice the kicker, Joseph's kick was successful, giving the Vikings a 39–36 win and completing the biggest comeback in NFL history.

With the win, the Vikings improved to 11–3 and won the NFC North. This win was also their first over Indianapolis since 1997, ending a run of six straight losses.

==== Week 16: vs. New York Giants ====
Week 16: New York Giants at Minnesota Vikings – Game summary

Quarter	1	2	3	4	Total
Giants	0	7	6	11	**24**
**Vikings**	7	3	0	17	**27**

at U.S. Bank Stadium, Minneapolis, Minnesota

- Date: December 24
- Game time: 12:00 p.m. CST
- Game weather: None (indoor stadium)
- Game attendance: 66,919
- Referee: Adrian Hill (29)
- TV announcers (Fox): Adam Amin, Mark Schlereth and Kristina Pink
- Recap, Game Book

Game information

**First quarter**

- MIN – T. J. Hockenson 12-yard pass from Kirk Cousins (Greg Joseph kick), 3:17. Vikings 7–0. **Drive: 8 plays, 84 yards, 3:50.**

**Second quarter**

- MIN – Greg Joseph 40-yard field goal, 9:40. Vikings 10–0. **Drive: 10 plays, 42 yards, 5:10.**
- NYG – Isaiah Hodgins 7-yard pass from Daniel Jones (Graham Gano kick), 4:23. Vikings 10–7. **Drive: 10 plays, 69 yards, 5:17.**

**Third quarter**

- NYG – Graham Gano 44-yard field goal, 11:18. Tied 10–10. **Drive: 8 plays, 49 yards, 3:42.**
- NYG – Graham Gano 44-yard field goal, 4:31. Giants 13–10. **Drive: 8 plays, 55 yards, 4:42.**

**Fourth quarter**

- MIN – T. J. Hockenson 15-yard pass from Kirk Cousins (Greg Joseph kick), 14:12. Vikings 17–13. **Drive: 12 plays, 75 yards, 5:19.**
- NYG – Graham Gano 55-yard field goal, 6:24. Vikings 17–16. **Drive: 6 plays, 18 yards, 2:31.**
- MIN – Justin Jefferson 17-yard pass from Kirk Cousins (Greg Joseph kick), 3:00. Vikings 24–16. **Drive: 5 plays, 29 yards, 1:02.**
- NYG – Saquon Barkley 27-yard run (Daniel Jones–Daniel Bellinger pass), 2:01. Tied 24–24. **Drive: 7 plays, 75 yards, 0:59.**
- MIN – Greg Joseph 61-yard field goal, 0:00. Vikings 27–24. **Drive: 8 plays, 33 yards, 2:01.**

**Top passers**

- NYG – Daniel Jones – 30/42, 334 yards, TD, INT
- MIN – Kirk Cousins – 34/48, 299 yards, 3 TD

**Top rushers**

- NYG – Saquon Barkley – 14 rushes, 84 yards, TD
- MIN – Dalvin Cook – 14 rushes, 64 yards

**Top receivers**

- NYG – Richie James – 8 receptions, 90 yards
- MIN – Justin Jefferson – 12 receptions, 133 yards, TD

Having secured the division title the previous week, the Vikings' next goal was to secure the #2 seed in the NFC and homefield advantage in the postseason until at least the divisional round. After trading punts on the opening four drives, the Vikings opened the scoring towards the end of the first quarter, finishing off an eight-play drive with a 12-yard pass from Kirk Cousins to T. J. Hockenson. The Giants drove into Minnesota territory on the next possession, but after a 16-yard completion from Daniel Jones to Daniel Bellinger to start the second quarter, rookie linebacker Brian Asamoah II punched the ball out and returned it to the Minnesota 36-yard line. The Vikings were able to add to their lead after driving down to the Giants' red zone, but a sack on Cousins on third down pushed them back and they had to settle for a Greg Joseph field goal. The Giants responded with a score of their own as Jones completed five out of five pass attempts and also ran for 14 yards, culminating with a 7-yard touchdown throw to Isaiah Hodgins. The two teams then traded punts on four straight possessions again to end the half with the Vikings leading 10–7.

The Giants tied the game on the opening drive of the second half; after a 22-yard completion to Darius Slayton got them into Vikings territory, the drive stalled but they were able to kick a 44-yard field goal through Graham Gano. After another Vikings punt on the next possession, the Giants were again able to move into the Minnesota half of the field thanks to long passes to Saquon Barkley and Richie James, only for the drive to again stall after pressure from cornerback Patrick Peterson led to Jones being sacked by D. J. Wonnum and Danielle Hunter, leading to another 44-yard field goal by Gano. The Vikings' following possession began with a 16-yard catch from tight end Johnny Mundt, before Cousins attempted to throw to Adam Thielen, only to see the ball intercepted by Cordale Flott; however, the ruling was overturned on review as Flott did not maintain possession as he went to ground. The reprieve allowed the Vikings to continue the drive, which culminated with another touchdown catch for Hockenson from 15 yards out, putting the hosts back in front 17–13 as the game entered the fourth quarter.

The next possession saw the Giants make their way to the Minnesota 32-yard line, where a pass intended for Hodgins was intercepted by Peterson; however, the Vikings were unable to capitalise as their drive stalled just inside the Giants' half. They attempted to go for it on 4th-and-2, but Cousins' deep pass attempt to Justin Jefferson fell incomplete. The Giants were then able to reduce the deficit to a single point; after the turnover, they only managed to go 18 yards, but Gano was successful on a 55-yard field goal attempt. The Vikings then had to punt, before forcing the Giants to do the same, only for Josh Metellus to block Jamie Gillan's kick, giving Minnesota the ball on the Giants' 29-yard line. A 4-yard run from Dalvin Cook and an 8-yard completion to K. J. Osborn gave them a first down, before Cousins found Jefferson over the middle for a 17-yard touchdown to extend the lead to eight points with just over 3 minutes to play. The Giants came back with a quick score of their own, as a 32-yard catch by Slayton was followed up by a 27-yard touchdown run by Barkley, before Jones found Bellinger in the end zone for the two-point conversion, tying the scores at 24–24 with less than a minute taken off the clock. A 16-yard catch from Jefferson on third down got the Vikings to their own 42-yard line, but a sack on Cousins presented them with another third-down after taking their final timeout. On 3rd-and-11, Cousins again found Jefferson for 17 yards, taking the Vikings to the Giants' 42-yard line, where Cousins was able to spike the ball with four seconds left. Joseph was successful with a personal and franchise-record 61-yard field goal, giving the Vikings a 27–24 win and an overall 8–1 record at home on the season. The 61-yard field goal set a franchise record.

==== Week 17: at Green Bay Packers ====
Week 17: Minnesota Vikings at Green Bay Packers – Game summary

Quarter	1	2	3	4	Total
Vikings	3	0	0	14	**17**
**Packers**	14	13	0	14	**41**

at Lambeau Field, Green Bay, Wisconsin

- Date: January 1
- Game time: 3:25 p.m. CST
- Game weather: Clear, 40 °F (4 °C)
- Game attendance: 78,190
- Referee: Carl Cheffers (51)
- TV announcers (CBS): Jim Nantz, Tony Romo and Tracy Wolfson
- Recap, Game Book

Game information

**First quarter**

- MIN – Greg Joseph 21-yard field goal, 10:38. Vikings 3–0. **Drive: 4 plays, −1 yard, 1:12.**
- GB – Keisean Nixon 105-yard kickoff return (Mason Crosby kick), 10:25. Packers 7–3. **Drive: 0 plays, 0 yards, 0:13.**
- GB – Darnell Savage 75-yard interception return (Mason Crosby kick), 5:17. Packers 14–3.

**Second quarter**

- GB – Mason Crosby 26-yard field goal, 9:48. Packers 17–3. **Drive: 14 plays, 56 yards, 6:49.**
- GB – Robert Tonyan 21-yard pass from Aaron Rodgers (Mason Crosby kick), 2:41. Packers 24–3. **Drive: 5 plays, 60 yards, 3:11.**
- GB – Mason Crosby 56-yard field goal, 0:00. Packers 27–3. **Drive: 4 plays, 23 yards, 0:36.**

**Third quarter**

- No scoring plays.

**Fourth quarter**

- GB – A. J. Dillon 2-yard run (Mason Crosby kick), 14:54. Packers 34–3. **Drive: 12 plays, 76 yards, 7:12.**
- GB – Aaron Rodgers 2-yard run (Mason Crosby kick), 9:25. Packers 41–3. **Drive: 8 plays, 45 yards, 5:15.**
- MIN – Jalen Nailor 47-yard pass from Kirk Cousins (Greg Joseph kick), 7:36. Packers 41–10. **Drive: 4 plays, 59 yards, 1:49.**
- MIN – K. J. Osborn 9-yard pass from Nick Mullens (Greg Joseph kick), 0:21. Packers 41–17. **Drive: 8 plays, 79 yards, 3:37.**

**Top passers**

- MIN – Kirk Cousins – 18/31, 205 yards, TD, 3 INT
- GB – Aaron Rodgers – 15/24, 159 yards, TD

**Top rushers**

- MIN – Alexander Mattison – 8 rushes, 38 yards
- GB – Aaron Jones – 14 rushes, 111 yards

**Top receivers**

- MIN – Jalen Nailor – 3 receptions, 89 yards, TD
- GB – Allen Lazard – 5 receptions, 59 yards

With the loss, the Vikings not only dropped to the NFC's #3 seed, but also eliminated them from obtaining the #1 seed, thus ensuring the Vikings would begin their playoff run at home in the Wild Card round.

==== Week 18: at Chicago Bears ====
Week 18: Minnesota Vikings at Chicago Bears – Game summary

Quarter	1	2	3	4	Total
**Vikings**	6	10	7	6	**29**
Bears	0	6	7	0	**13**

at Soldier Field, Chicago, Illinois

- Date: January 8
- Game time: 12:00 p.m. CST
- Game weather: Mostly cloudy, 34 °F (1 °C)
- Game attendance: 60,007
- Referee: Brad Allen (122)
- TV announcers (Fox): Kenny Albert, Jonathan Vilma and Shannon Spake
- Recap, Game Book

Game information

**First quarter**

- MIN – Adam Thielen 4-yard pass from Kirk Cousins (kick failed, wide right), 10:12. Vikings 6–0. **Drive: 4 plays, 73 yards, 2:17.**

**Second quarter**

- MIN – Alexander Mattison 1-yard run (Greg Joseph kick), 9:20. Vikings 13–0. **Drive: 12 plays, 66 yards, 6:29.**
- MIN – Greg Joseph 28-yard field goal, 4:57. Vikings 16–0. **Drive: 6 plays, 25 yards, 3:22.**
- CHI – Velus Jones Jr. 42-yard run (pass failed), 3:31. Vikings 16–6. **Drive: 3 plays, 75 yards, 1:26.**

**Third quarter**

- MIN – Alexander Mattison 1-yard run (Greg Joseph kick), 9:25. Vikings 23–6. **Drive: 11 plays, 75 yards, 5:35.**
- CHI – Cole Kmet 11-yard pass from Nathan Peterman (Cairo Santos kick), 4:07. Vikings 23–13. **Drive: 10 plays, 75 yards, 5:18.**

**Fourth quarter**

- MIN – Greg Joseph 50-yard field goal, 14:55. Vikings 26–13. **Drive: 8 plays, 43 yards, 4:12.**
- MIN – Greg Joseph 41-yard field goal, 3:39. Vikings 29–13. **Drive: 9 plays, 36 yards, 3:35.**

**Top passers**

- MIN – Kirk Cousins – 17/20, 225 yards, TD
- CHI – Nathan Peterman – 11/19, 114 yards, TD

**Top rushers**

- MIN – Alexander Mattison – 10 rushes, 54 yards, 2 TD
- CHI – Khalil Herbert – 10 rushes, 50 yards

**Top receivers**

- MIN – K. J. Osborn – 5 receptions, 117 yards
- CHI – Cole Kmet – 4 receptions, 57 yards, TD

=== Standings ===
==== Division ====
NFC North
	W	L	T	PCT	DIV	CONF	PF	PA	STK
^{(3)} Minnesota Vikings	13	4	0	.765	4–2	8–4	424	427	W1
Detroit Lions	9	8	0	.529	5–1	7–5	453	427	W2
Green Bay Packers	8	9	0	.471	3–3	6–6	370	371	L1
Chicago Bears	3	14	0	.176	0–6	1–11	326	463	L10

==== Conference ====
NFC
#	Team	Division	W	L	T	PCT	DIV	CONF	SOS	SOV	STK
**Division leaders**
1	Philadelphia Eagles	East	14	3	0	.824	4–2	9–3	.474	.460	W1
2 (Note: San Francisco claimed the No. 2 seed over Minnesota based on conference record (10–2 vs. 8–4).)	San Francisco 49ers	West	13	4	0	.765	6–0	10–2	.417	.414	W10
3	Minnesota Vikings	North	13	4	0	.765	4–2	8–4	.474	.425	W1
4	Tampa Bay Buccaneers	South	8	9	0	.471	4–2	8–4	.503	.426	L1
**Wild cards**
5	Dallas Cowboys	East	12	5	0	.706	4–2	8–4	.507	.485	L1
6	New York Giants	East	9	7	1	.559	1–4–1	4–7–1	.526	.395	L1
7 (Note: Seattle finished ahead of Detroit based on head-to-head victory, claiming the 7th and final playoff spot.)	Seattle Seahawks	West	9	8	0	.529	4–2	6–6	.462	.382	W2
**Did not qualify for the postseason**
8	Detroit Lions	North	9	8	0	.529	5–1	7–5	.535	.451	W2
9	Washington Commanders	East	8	8	1	.500	2–3–1	5–6–1	.536	.449	W1
10	Green Bay Packers	North	8	9	0	.471	3–3	6–6	.524	.449	L1
11 (Note: Carolina finished ahead of New Orleans and Atlanta based on head-to-head record (3–1 vs. 2–2/1–3).)	Carolina Panthers	South	7	10	0	.412	4–2	6–6	.474	.437	W1
12 (Note: New Orleans finished ahead of Atlanta based on head-to-head sweep.)	New Orleans Saints	South	7	10	0	.412	2–4	5–7	.507	.462	L1
13	Atlanta Falcons	South	7	10	0	.412	2–4	6–6	.467	.429	W2
14	Los Angeles Rams	West	5	12	0	.294	1–5	3–9	.517	.341	L2
15	Arizona Cardinals	West	4	13	0	.235	1–5	3–9	.529	.368	L7
16	Chicago Bears	North	3	14	0	.176	0–6	1–11	.571	.480	L10
**Tiebreakers** (Note: When breaking ties for three or more teams under the NFL's rules, they are first broken within divisions, then comparing only the highest-ranked remaining team from each division.)

== Postseason ==
=== Schedule ===
Round	Date	Opponent (seed)	Result	Record	Venue	Recap
Wild Card	January 15	New York Giants (6)	L 24–31	0–1	U.S. Bank Stadium	Recap

=== Game summaries ===
==== NFC Wild Card Playoffs: vs. (6) New York Giants ====
NFC Wild Card Playoffs: (6) New York Giants at (3) Minnesota Vikings – Game summary

Quarter	1	2	3	4	Total
Giants	14	3	7	7	31
Vikings	7	7	7	3	24

at U.S. Bank Stadium, Minneapolis, Minnesota

- Date: January 15, 2023
- Game time: 3:30 p.m. CST
- Game weather: None (indoor stadium)
- Game attendance: 66,721
- Referee: Adrian Hill (29)
- TV announcers (Fox): Kevin Burkhardt, Greg Olsen, Erin Andrews and Tom Rinaldi
- Recap, Game Book

Game information

First quarter

- MIN – Kirk Cousins 1-yard run (Greg Joseph kick), 8:23. Vikings 7–0. Drive: 12 plays, 75 yards, 6:37.
- NYG – Saquon Barkley 28-yard run (Graham Gano kick), 5:11. Tied 7–7. Drive: 5 plays, 75 yards, 3:12.
- NYG – Isaiah Hodgins 14-yard pass from Daniel Jones (Graham Gano kick), 1:03. Giants 14–7. Drive: 4 plays, 81 yards, 2:03.

Second quarter

- NYG – Graham Gano 25-yard field goal, 3:25. Giants 17–7. Drive: 20 plays, 85 yards, 10:52.
- MIN – K. J. Osborn 9-yard pass from Kirk Cousins (Greg Joseph kick), 0:45. Giants 17–14. Drive: 8 plays, 75 yards, 2:40.

Third quarter

- NYG – Daniel Bellinger 9-yard pass from Daniel Jones (Graham Gano kick), 11:37. Giants 24–14. Drive: 6 plays, 75 yards, 3:23.
- MIN – Irv Smith Jr. 3-yard pass from Kirk Cousins (Greg Joseph kick), 7:46. Giants 24–21. Drive: 8 plays, 75 yards, 3:51.

Fourth quarter

- MIN – Greg Joseph 38-yard field goal, 12:34. Tied 24–24. Drive: 12 plays, 56 yards, 6:38.
- NYG – Saquon Barkley 2-yard run (Graham Gano kick), 7:47. Giants 31–24. Drive: 12 plays, 75 yards, 4:47.

Top passers

- NYG – Daniel Jones – 24/35, 301 yards, 2 TD
- MIN – Kirk Cousins – 31/39, 273 yards, 2 TD

Top rushers

- NYG – Daniel Jones – 17 rushes, 78 yards
- MIN – Dalvin Cook – 15 rushes, 60 yards

Top receivers

- NYG – Isaiah Hodgins – 8 receptions, 105 yards, TD
- MIN – T. J. Hockenson – 10 receptions, 129 yards

== Statistics ==
=== Team leaders ===
Category	Player(s)	Total
Passing yards	Kirk Cousins	4,547
Passing touchdowns	Kirk Cousins	29
Rushing yards	Dalvin Cook	1,173
Rushing touchdowns	Dalvin Cook	8
Receptions	Justin Jefferson	128
Receiving yards	Justin Jefferson	1,809
Receiving touchdowns	Justin Jefferson	8
Points	Greg Joseph	118
Kickoff return yards	Kene Nwangwu	920
Punt return yards	Jalen Reagor	167
Tackles	Eric Kendricks	137
Sacks	Danielle Hunter	10.5
Interceptions	Harrison Smith; Patrick Peterson	5
Forced fumbles	Za'Darius Smith	2

Source: Pro-Football-Reference.com

=== League rankings ===
Category	Total yards	Yards per game	NFL rank (out of 32)
Passing offense	4,484	263.8	6th
Rushing offense	1,661	97.7	27th
Total offense	6,145	361.5	7th
Passing defense	4,515	265.6	31st
Rushing defense	2093	123.1	20th
Total defense	6,608	388.7	31st

Source: ProFootballReference.com
