= Jalen Nailor =

American football player (born 1999)

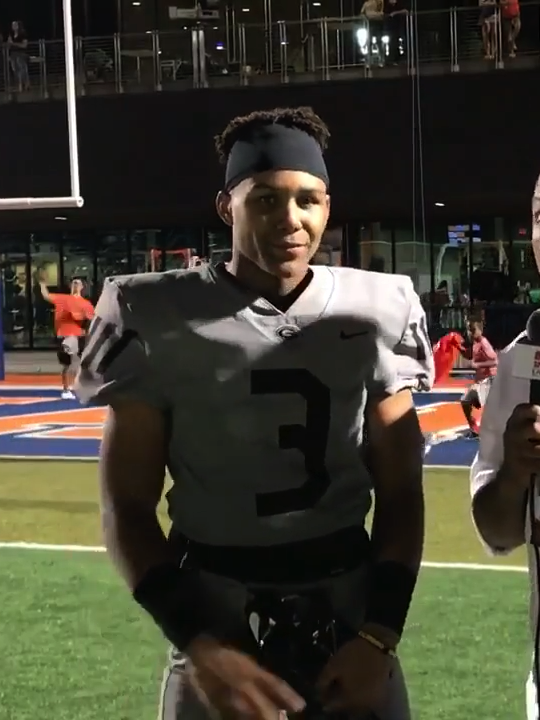
- Nailor with the Bishop Gorman Gaels in 2017

No. 9 – Las Vegas Raiders
- Position: Wide receiver
- Roster status: Active

Personal information
- Born: March 2, 1999 (age 27); Palmdale, California, U.S.
- Listed height: 6 ft 0 in (1.83 m)
- Listed weight: 190 lb (86 kg)

Career information
- High school: Bishop Gorman (Las Vegas, Nevada)
- College: Michigan State (2018–2021)
- NFL draft: 2022: 6th round, 191st overall pick

Career history
- Minnesota Vikings (2022–2025); Las Vegas Raiders (2026–present)

Career NFL statistics as of 2025
- Receptions: 69
- Receiving yards: 1,066
- Receiving touchdowns: 11
- Stats at Pro Football Reference

Jalen Rasheed Nailor (born March 2, 1999), nicknamed "Speedy", is an American professional football wide receiver for the Las Vegas Raiders of the National Football League (NFL). He played college football for the Michigan State Spartans.

== Early life ==
Nailor attended Bishop Gorman High School in Las Vegas, Nevada. In high school, Nailor played football and ran track, winning four state titles. Nailor recorded 28 touchdowns and over 2,000 yards in his high school career including 12 touchdowns, 41 receptions, and 807 yards in his senior year. After originally being committed to Arizona State, Nailor decommitted after Sun Devil's head coach Todd Graham was fired. Nailor, a three-star recruit, would instead choose to play at Michigan State University.

== College career ==
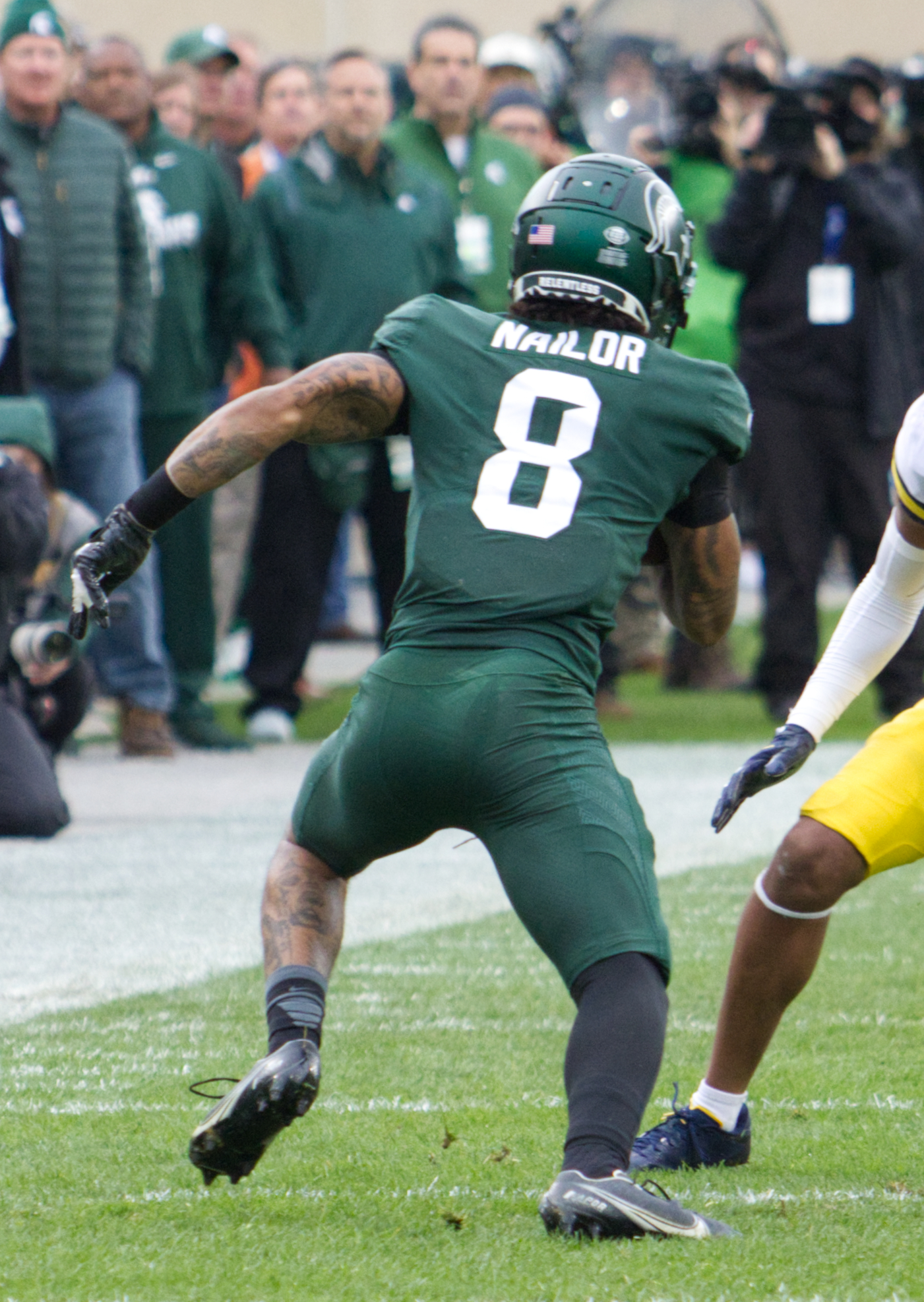
Nailor with Michigan State in 2021

In 2020, Nailor led the Big Ten Conference in yards per catch while being the runner-up in 2021. In 2021, in a game against Rutgers, Nailor put up a career high 221 yards with three touchdowns. In his college career, Nailor played in 28 games with Michigan State. Throughout his career, Nailor tallied stats of 86 receptions, 1,453 yards, and 12 touchdowns. At the end of his collegiate career, Nailor declared for the 2022 NFL draft.

== Professional career ==
Pre-draft measurables
Height	Weight	Arm length	Hand span	Wingspan	40-yard dash	10-yard split	20-yard split	20-yard shuttle	Three-cone drill	Vertical jump	Broad jump	Bench press
5 ft 11 1/4 in (1.81 m)	186 lb (84 kg)	30 1/4 in (0.77 m)	9 1/8 in (0.23 m)	6 ft 1 in (1.85 m)	4.50 s	1.54 s	2.58 s	4.28 s	7.03 s	38.0 in (0.97 m)	10 ft 8 in (3.25 m)	14 reps
All values from NFL Combine/Pro Day

=== Minnesota Vikings ===
Nailor was selected by the Minnesota Vikings in the sixth round (191st overall) of the 2022 NFL draft. In Week 4, against the New Orleans Saints, Nailor made his first career catch on a 13-yard fake punt from punter Ryan Wright, in the 28–25 win. In Week 17, against the Green Bay Packers, Nailor recorded his first career touchdown reception, a 47-yard pass from Kirk Cousins. He finished the game with three catches for 89 yards. As a rookie, he appeared in 15 games and recorded nine receptions for 179 yards and one touchdown. In addition, he was a contributor on special teams.

On September 21, 2023, Nailor was placed on injured reserve. He was activated on November 4. In the 2023 season, Nailor had three receptions for 29 yards in six games and one start. In the 2024 season, Nailor had 28 receptions for 414 yards and six touchdowns.

=== Las Vegas Raiders ===
On March 12, 2026, the Las Vegas Raiders signed Nailor to a three-year, $35 million contract with $23 million guaranteed and a signing bonus of $6 million.

== Career statistics ==
Legend
**Bold**	Career high

=== NFL ===
==== Regular season ====
Year	Team	Games		Receiving					Fumbles	
Year	Team	GP	GS	Rec	Yds	Avg	Lng	TD	Fum	Lost
2022	MIN	15	0	9	179	**19.9**	47	1	0	0
2023	MIN	6	1	3	29	9.7	16	0	0	0
2024	MIN	17	7	28	414	14.8	33	**6**	**1**	**1**
2025	MIN	17	8	**29**	**444**	15.3	**62**	4	0	0
Total		55	16	69	1,066	15.4	62	11	1	1
Source: pro-football-reference.com

==== Postseason ====
Year	Team	Games		Receiving					Fumbles	
Year	Team	GP	GS	Rec	Yds	Avg	Lng	TD	Fum	Lost
2024	MIN	1	0	3	33	11.0	14	0	0	0
Career		1	0	3	33	11.0	14	0	0	0
Source: pro-football-reference.com

=== College ===
College statistics
Season	GP	Receiving				Rushing			
Season	GP	Rec	Yds	Avg	TD	Att	Yds	Avg	TD
2018	8	8	138	17.3	2	**9**	**128**	**14.2**	**1**
2019	4	15	106	7.1	0	5	27	5.4	0
2020	7	26	515	**19.8**	4	2	11	5.5	0
2021	9	**37**	**694**	18.8	**6**	1	-3	-3.0	0
Career	28	86	1,453	16.9	12	17	163	9.6	1
