= Akayleb Evans =

American football player (born 1999)

No. 29 – Carolina Panthers
- Position: Cornerback
- Roster status: Injured reserve

Personal information
- Born: June 22, 1999 (age 27); Long Island, New York, U.S.
- Listed height: 6 ft 2 in (1.88 m)
- Listed weight: 205 lb (93 kg)

Career information
- High school: McKinney (McKinney, Texas)
- College: Tulsa (2017–2020); Missouri (2021)
- NFL draft: 2022: 4th round, 118th overall pick

Career history
- Minnesota Vikings (2022–2024); Carolina Panthers (2024–present)

Career NFL statistics as of Week 4, 2026
- Total tackles: 123
- Forced fumbles: 4
- Pass deflections: 12
- Interceptions: 1
- Stats at Pro Football Reference

Akayleb Evans (born June 22, 1999) is an American professional football cornerback for the Carolina Panthers of the National Football League (NFL). He played college football for the Tulsa Golden Hurricane before transferring to the Missouri Tigers.

== Early life ==
Evans grew up in McKinney, Texas and attended McKinney High School. As a senior, he recorded 48 tackles, five pass breakups, and one fumble recovery and was named second-team all-District 10-6A. Evans initially committed to play college football at Kansas, but later flipped his commitment to Tulsa.

== College career ==
Evans began his collegiate career with the Tulsa Golden Hurricane. As a freshman, he played in nine games with five starts and had 26 tackles and two passes broken up. Evans suffered a shoulder injury in the third game of his junior season and used a medical redshirt. He played in all nine of Tulsa's games during their COVID-19-shortened 2020 season and finished the year with 30 tackles (27 solo tackles), one sack, three passes broken up, and one forced fumble. After his redshirt junior season, Evans entered the transfer portal.

Evans transferred to Missouri as a graduate transfer. He had considered offers from Notre Dame, Texas, Texas Tech, and Jackson State. In his lone season with the Tigers, Evans was a starter at cornerback and finished the season with 28 tackles, two forced fumbles, six passes broken up, and one interception. After the conclusion of his college career, Evans played in the 2022 Senior Bowl.

=== College statistics ===
Year	Team	Games		Tackles				Interceptions				Fumbles		
Year	Team	GP	GS	Total	Solo	Ast	Sack	PD	Int	Yds	TD	FF	FR	TD
2017	Tulsa	9	6	26	20	6	0.0	2	0	0	0	0	0	0
2018	Tulsa	9	5	21	13	8	0.0	4	0	0	0	0	0	0
2019	Tulsa	3	3	6	2	4	0.0	2	0	0	0	0	0	0
2020	Tulsa	9	9	29	24	5	1.0	3	0	0	0	1	0	0
2021	Missouri	11	8	30	27	3	0.0	6	1	0	0	2	0	0
Career		41	31	112	86	26	1.0	17	1	0	0	3	0	0

== Professional career ==
Pre-draft measurables
Height	Weight	Arm length	Hand span	Wingspan	40-yard dash	10-yard split	20-yard split	20-yard shuttle	Three-cone drill	Vertical jump	Broad jump	Bench press
6 ft 2 in (1.88 m)	197 lb (89 kg)	32 in (0.81 m)	8 3/4 in (0.22 m)	6 ft 2 3/4 in (1.90 m)	4.46 s	1.53 s	2.59 s	4.09 s	7.07 s	36.0 in (0.91 m)	10 ft 9 in (3.28 m)	17 reps
All values from NFL Combine/Pro Day

=== Minnesota Vikings ===
Evans was selected by the Minnesota Vikings with the 118th pick of the fourth round of the 2022 NFL draft. Evans entered his rookie season as the fourth cornerback on the depth chart behind Patrick Peterson, Cameron Dantzler, and Chandon Sullivan. He was placed on injured reserve on December 7, 2022.

On November 23, 2024, Evans was waived by the Vikings.

=== Carolina Panthers ===
On November 25, 2024, Evans was claimed off waivers by the Carolina Panthers.

On March 11, 2026, Evans re-signed with the Panthers on a one-year contract.

=== NFL career statistics ===
Legend
**Bold**	Career high

Year	Team	Games		Tackles					Interceptions						Fumbles		
Year	Team	GP	GS	Total	Solo	Ast	Sck	TKL	PD	Int	Yds	Avg	Lng	TD	FF	FR	TD
2022	MIN	10	2	23	19	4	0.0	**3**	2	0	0	0.0	0	0	1	0	0
2023	MIN	15	**15**	**65**	**49**	**16**	0.0	0	**7**	**1**	**1**	**1.0**	**1**	0	**3**	0	0
2024	MIN	7	0	2	1	1	0.0	0	0	0	0	0.0	0	0	0	0	0
2024	CAR	2	1	3	3	0	0.0	0	1	0	0	0.0	0	0	0	0	0
2025	CAR	**16**	0	12	6	6	0.0	0	0	0	0	0.0	0	0	0	0	0
2025	CAR	4	1	18	12	6	0.0	0	**2**	0	0	0.0	0	0	0	0	0
Career		54	19	123	90	33	0.0	3	12	1	1	1.0	1	0	4	0	0
