= Saraland High School =

Location
- 1115 Industrial Parkway; Saraland, Alabama 36571; United States; 30°48′08″N 88°06′03″W

Information
- Type: Public high school
- Established: 2010 (16 years ago)
- CEEB code: 012379
- NCES School ID: 010018502137
- Principal: Brent Harrison
- Teaching staff: 70.25 (on FTE basis)
- Grades: 9–12
- Enrollment: 1,151 (2023-2024)
- Student to teacher ratio: 16.38
- Education system: Saraland City Schools
- Campus type: Suburban
- Colors: Red and silver
- Mascot: Spartan
- Yearbook: The Spartan
- Website: shspartans.saralandboe.org

Saraland High School (SHS), located in Saraland, Alabama, is a public high school operated by the Saraland City Schools that educates grades 9–12.

The school's mascot is the spartan.

== History ==
Saraland Schools was previously part of the Mobile County Public School System until 2006. Voters approved a plan to break away from the county system and form the Saraland City Schools system.

== Athletics ==
Saraland High School competes in Class 5A of AHSAA.

During the 2022 football season, the Spartans saw major success in their football program, winning their first 6A football title in program history. The team had made the title game twice before, but lost to Clay-Chalkville and Pinson Valley, respectively. During the 2022 title game, Saraland beat Mountain Brook High School, 17-38.

== Notable alumni ==
- Cordale Flott, NFL cornerback for the New York Giants
- Matt Peacock, MLB pitcher for the Kansas City Royals
- Velus Jones Jr., NFL wide receiver/return specialist for the Chicago Bears
- DJ Thomas-Jones, NFL fullback for the Pittsburgh Steelers
- Ryan Coleman-Williams, college football wide receiver for the Alabama Crimson Tide
