= Velus Jones Jr. =

American football player (born 1997)

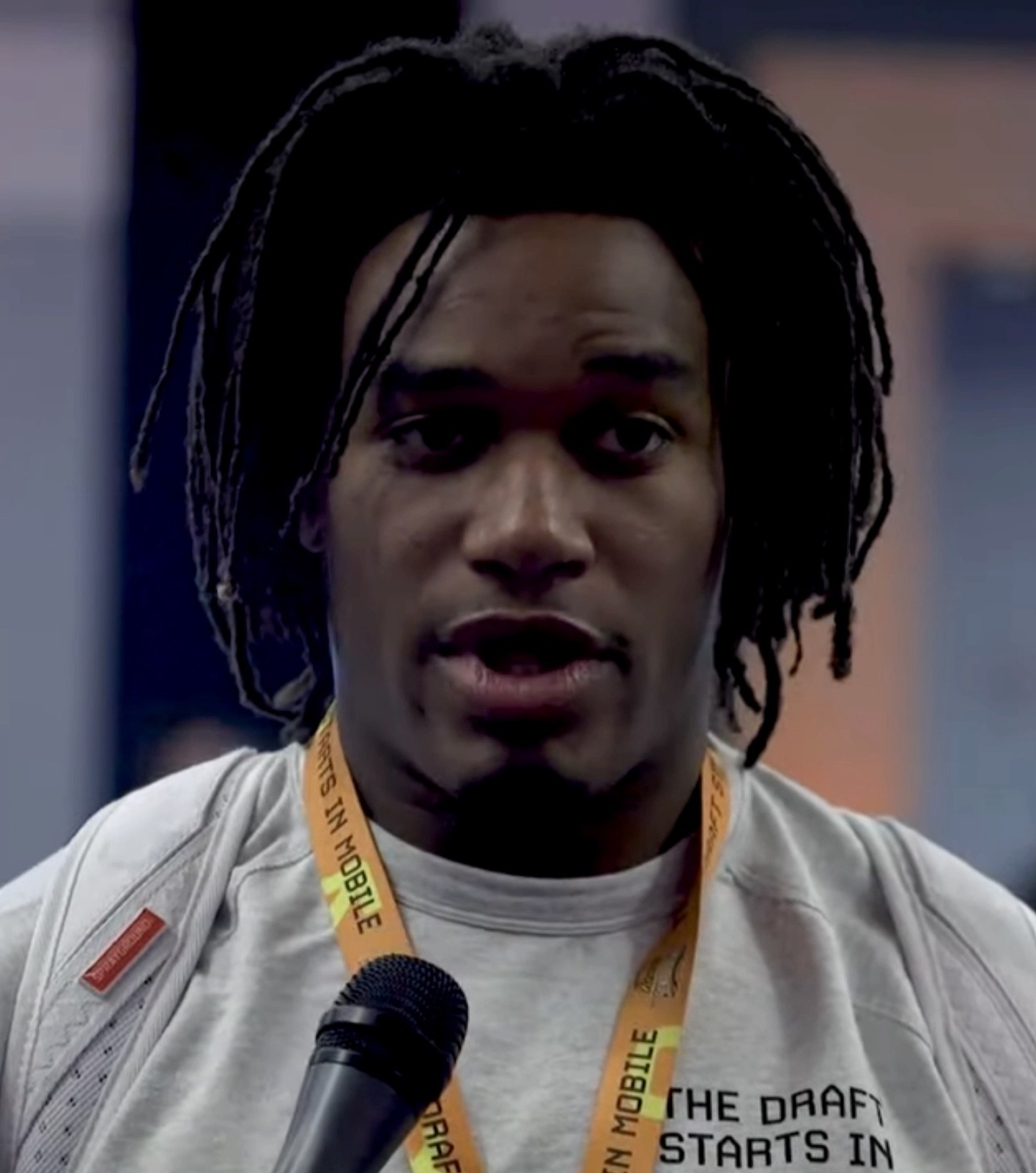
- Jones Jr. in 2022

No. 33 – Seattle Seahawks
- Position: Running back
- Roster status: Practice squad

Personal information
- Born: May 11, 1997 (age 29); Mobile, Alabama, U.S.
- Listed height: 6 ft 0 in (1.83 m)
- Listed weight: 204 lb (93 kg)

Career information
- High school: Saraland (Saraland, Alabama)
- College: USC (2016–2019); Tennessee (2020–2021)
- NFL draft: 2022: 3rd round, 71st overall pick

Career history
- Chicago Bears (2022–2024); Jacksonville Jaguars (2024)*; Carolina Panthers (2024); New Orleans Saints (2025); Seattle Seahawks (2025–present)
- * Offseason or practice squad member only

Awards and highlights
- Super Bowl champion (LX); SEC Co-Special Teams Player of the Year (2021); First-team All-SEC (2021); Second-team All-Pac-12 (2019)

Career NFL statistics as of Week 8, 2026
- Receptions: 13
- Receiving yards: 134
- Receiving touchdowns: 1
- Rushing yards: 225
- Rushing touchdowns: 1
- Return yards: 1,319
- Stats at Pro Football Reference

Velus Tyler Phillip Jones Jr. (born May 11, 1997) is an American professional football running back for the Seattle Seahawks of the National Football League (NFL). He played college football for the USC Trojans before transferring to the Tennessee Volunteers. Jones was selected by the Chicago Bears in the third round of the 2022 NFL draft.

== Early life ==
Jones was born in Mobile, Alabama and lived there until his family moved to Saraland, Alabama when he was eight years old. He attended Saraland High School and was named first team All-State as a junior after catching 51 passes for 1,118 yards and nine touchdowns. Jones repeated as a first team All-State selection as a senior. Jones was rated a four-star recruit and committed to play college football at USC. He later de-committed and then briefly committed to play at Oklahoma before re-committing to play at USC. He is of Dutch descent.

== College career ==
Jones began his college career at USC and redshirted his true freshman season. He served as the Trojans' primary kick returner in his redshirt freshman season and gained 760 yards on 31 returns. As a redshirt sophomore, Jones caught 24 passes for 266 yards with one touchdown, returned 21 kickoffs for 483 yards, and also rushed for a touchdown. He returned 29 kickoffs for 704 yards and one touchdown during his redshirt junior season and was named to the second team All-Pac-12 Conference. After the season, Jones announced his intention to transfer from USC and ultimately committed to play at Tennessee.

Jones joined the Tennessee Volunteers as a graduate transfer, and was eligible to play for the team immediately. In his first season with the team he caught 22 passes for 280 yards and three touchdowns and led the Southeastern Conference (SEC) with 398 kickoff return yards. Jones decided to utilize the extra year of eligibility granted to college athletes who played in the 2020 season due to the coronavirus pandemic and return to Tennessee. He finished the 2021 season with 62 receptions for 807 yards and seven touchdowns and was named the SEC Special Teams Player of the Year after returning 24 kickoffs for 628 yards and one touchdown and 18 punts for 272 yards.

== Professional career ==
Pre-draft measurables
Height	Weight	Arm length	Hand span	Wingspan	40-yard dash	10-yard split	20-yard split	20-yard shuttle	Three-cone drill	Vertical jump	Broad jump	Bench press
5 ft 11 3/4 in (1.82 m)	204 lb (93 kg)	30 7/8 in (0.78 m)	9 3/4 in (0.25 m)	6 ft 1 1/2 in (1.87 m)	4.31 s	1.50 s	2.50 s	4.51 s	7.32 s	33.0 in (0.84 m)	10 ft 1 in (3.07 m)	18 reps
All values from NFL Combine/Pro Day

=== Chicago Bears ===
Jones was selected by the Chicago Bears in the third round with the 71st pick of the 2022 NFL draft. He signed a four-year contract with the Bears on May 17, 2022. Jones did not play in the first three weeks of the 2022 season for the Bears due to a hamstring injury. Jones made his NFL debut in Week 4 against the New York Giants on special teams. With the Bears down 20–12 with 2:14 left in the game, Jones muffed a punt on the Bears' own 34 yard line that was recovered by the Giants. Jones scored his first career touchdown on his first career reception in a 29–22 loss to the Minnesota Vikings during Week 5. In Week 6 against the Washington Commanders on Thursday Night Football, Jones muffed his second punt of the season, which was recovered by the Commanders on the Bears 6-yard line. This led to the Commanders' only touchdown of the game, and Bears would go on to lose 12–7. As a rookie, Jones played in 12 games and started two. He led the team in kickoff returns and kickoff return yards.

In the 2023 season, Jones appeared in 14 games. He continued to lead the team in kickoff returns and kickoff return yards with a small role in the offense.

On August 6, 2024, the Bears announced that Jones would be transitioning into a running back. The team's coaching staff was hopeful that Jones' new role on the team would reinvigorate his career, with Bears general manager Ryan Poles even rejecting a trade offer for Jones in the preseason. During the Bears' season opener against the Tennessee Titans, Jones bobbled a kickoff and inadvertently kicked it towards the opposing kickoff team. He was a healthy scratch for the Bears next five games and was released on October 25. Jones concluded his three-season tenure in Chicago with only 12 catches for 135 yards and 19 rushing attempts for 165 yards.

=== Jacksonville Jaguars ===
On October 29, 2024, Jones was signed to the Jacksonville Jaguars' practice squad.

=== Carolina Panthers ===
On December 10, 2024, Jones was signed to the Carolina Panthers' active roster off the Jaguars' practice squad.

=== New Orleans Saints ===
On March 15, 2025, Jones signed with the New Orleans Saints, who planned to utilize him as a running back. He was waived on October 7 and re-signed to the practice squad two days later. Jones was promoted to the active roster on October 21, but was waived three days later.

=== Seattle Seahawks ===
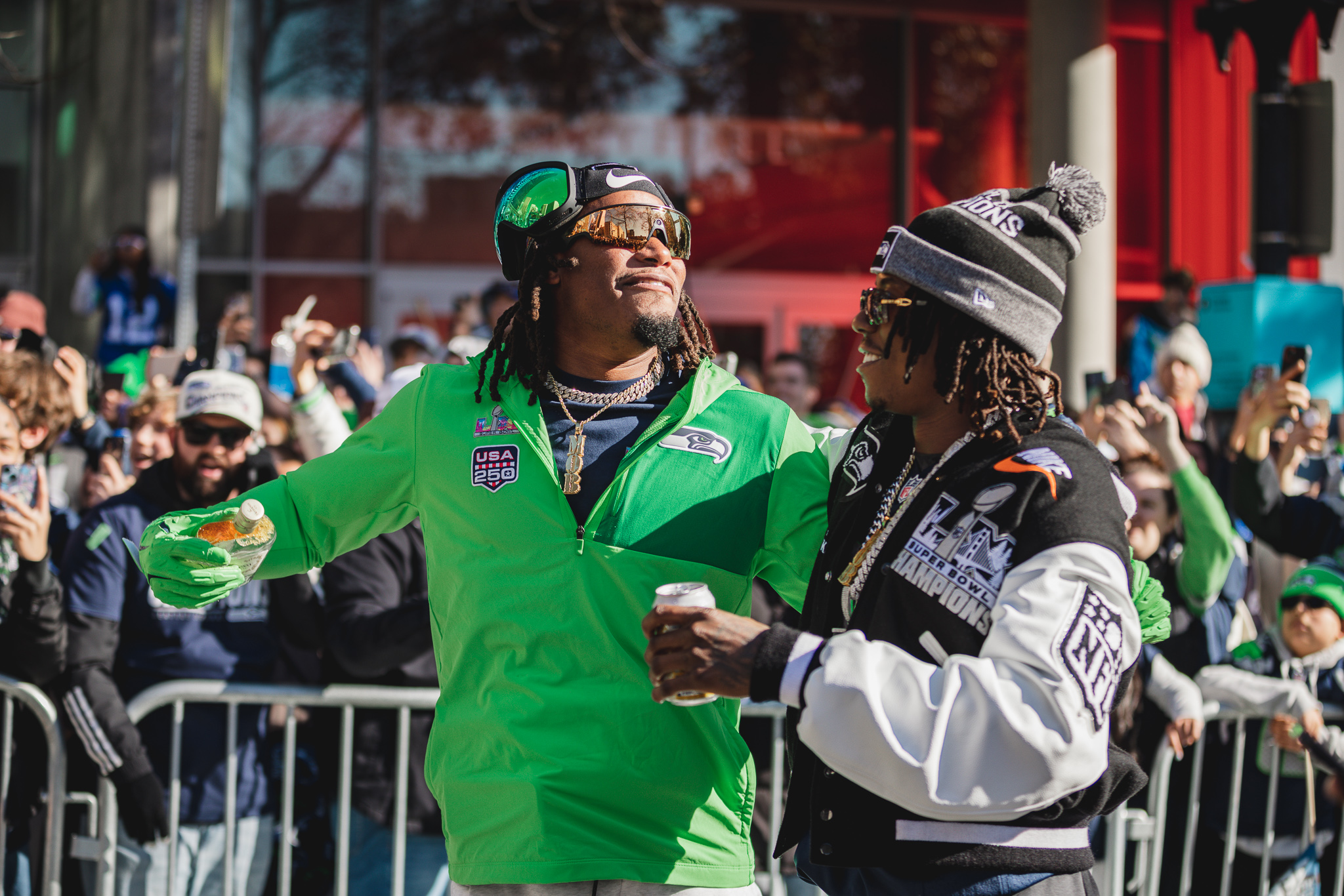
Jones (left) celebrating with Rashid Shaheed at the Super Bowl LX parade

On October 29, 2025, Jones signed with the Seattle Seahawks' practice squad. Jones was re-signed to the practice squad on November 18. He played on special teams in Super Bowl LX, and downed a punt within the five-yard-line in the 29–13 win over the New England Patriots.

On February 12, 2026, Jones signed a reserve/futures contract with the Seahawks. He was released by Seattle on August 30 as a part of final roster cuts and re-signed a day later to the practice squad. Jones was elevated to the active roster ahead of the season-opening game against the Patriots. He was signed to the active roster on October 3 after Jadarian Price was placed on injured reserve. On November 6, Jones was released and re-signed to the practice squad.

== Career statistics ==
College statistics
Season	Team	Games	Started	Rushing					Receiving					Kick returning					Punt returning				
Season	Team	Games	Started	Att	Yds	Avg		TD	Rec	Yds	Avg		TD	Att	Yds	Avg		TD	Ret	Yds	Avg		TD
2016	USC	1	0	0	0	—	—	0	0	0	—	—	0	0	0	—	—	0	0	0	—	—	0
2017	USC	13	0	5	15	3.0	0	0	6	46	7.7	0	0	31	760	24.5	0	0	0	0	—	0	0
2018	USC	11	4	6	13	2.2	0	1	24	266	11.1	0	1	21	483	23.0	0	0	0	0	—	0	0
2019	USC	11	2	0	0	—	—	0	6	35	5.8	0	0	29	704	24.3	0	1	0	0	—	—	0
2020	Tennessee	10	6	3	16	5.3	0	0	22	280	12.7	0	3	18	398	22.1	0	0	0	0	—	—	0
2021	Tennessee	13	9	1	15	15.0	0	0	62	807	13.0	0	7	23	628	27.3	0	1	18	272	15.1	0	0
Career		59	21	15	59	3.9	0	1	120	1,434	12.0	0	11	122	2,973	24.4	0	2	18	272	15.1	0	0

== Personal life ==
Jones' cousin, Cor'Dale Flott, also plays in the NFL for the Tennessee Titans.
