= Ryan Wright (American football) =

American football player (born 2000)

- Wright with the Minnesota Vikings in 2024

No. 17 – New Orleans Saints
- Position: Punter
- Roster status: Active

Personal information
- Born: June 1, 2000 (age 26); San Jose, California, U.S.
- Listed height: 6 ft 3 in (1.91 m)
- Listed weight: 245 lb (111 kg)

Career information
- High school: California (San Ramon)
- College: Tulane (2018–2021)
- NFL draft: 2022: undrafted

Career history
- Minnesota Vikings (2022–2025); New Orleans Saints (2026–present)

Awards and highlights
- 2× First-team All-AAC (2020, 2021)

Career NFL statistics as of Week 10, 2026
- Punts: 288
- Punting yards: 13,728
- Average punt: 47.7
- Longest punt: 77
- Inside 20: 115
- Stats at Pro Football Reference

Ryan Wright (born June 1, 2000) is an American professional football punter for the New Orleans Saints of the National Football League (NFL). He played college football for the Tulane Green Wave.

== Early life ==
Wright grew up in San Ramon, California and attended California High School. In addition to punting, Wright also played quarterback on varsity during his junior and senior years.

== College career ==
Wright attended Tulane. He played for the Green Wave from 2018 to 2021.

=== Statistics ===
Season	GP	Punting		
Season	GP	Punts	Yds	Avg
2018	10	45	1,978	44.0
2019	13	52	2,155	41.4
2020	11	52	2,352	45.2
2021	12	51	2,424	47.5
Career	46	200	8,909	44.5

== Professional career ==
Pre-draft measurables
Height	Weight	Arm length	Hand span	Wingspan	40-yard dash	10-yard split	20-yard split	Vertical jump	Broad jump	Bench press
6 ft 2 3/8 in (1.89 m)	240 lb (109 kg)	31 1/8 in (0.79 m)	9 1/8 in (0.23 m)	6 ft 4 7/8 in (1.95 m)	4.74 s	1.66 s	2.72 s	33.0 in (0.84 m)	9 ft 4 in (2.84 m)	12 reps
All values from Pro Day

=== Minnesota Vikings ===
Wright went undrafted in the 2022 NFL draft, but he signed a three-year, $2.5 million contract with the Minnesota Vikings on April 30, 2022. He competed with incumbent punter Jordan Berry in training camp. On August 25, the Vikings released Berry, leaving Wright as the sole punter on the roster.

In week 6 of the 2022 season, Wright was named National Football Conference Special Teams Player of the Week for the first time in his career for the 10-punt day he had against the Miami Dolphins, including a career-long 73-yard punt. As a rookie, he punted 73 times for 3,457 total yards for a 47.36 average in the 2022 season. In the 2023 season, he punted 59 times for 2,886 total yards for a 48.92 average.

On March 9, 2025, Wright re-signed with the Vikings on a one-year, $1.75 million contract.

=== New Orleans Saints ===
On March 11, 2026, Wright signed a four-year, $14 million contract with the New Orleans Saints.

== Career statistics ==
=== NFL ===
Legend
	Led the league
**Bold**	Career high

==== Regular season ====
Year	Team	GP	Punting							
Year	Team	GP	Punts	Yds	Lng	Avg	Ret Yds	Net Avg	Blk	Ins20
2022	MIN	**17**	**73**	**3,457**	73	47.4	**294**	42.5	**1**	**32**
2023	MIN	**17**	59	2,873	68	48.7	260	42.1	0	17
2024	MIN	**17**	56	2,604	66	46.5	196	40.5	**1**	27
2025	MIN	**17**	65	3,184	**77**	**49.0**	231	**44.5**	0	25
2026	NOR	9	35	1,610	64	46.0	219	39.7	0	14
Career		77	288	13,728	77	47.7	1,200	42.0	2	115

==== Postseason ====
Year	Team	GP	Punting							
Year	Team	GP	Punts	Yds	Lng	Avg	Ret Yds	Net Avg	Blk	Ins20
2022	MIN	**1**	**3**	**164**	**61**	**54.7**	**17**	**49.0**	0	**2**
2024	MIN	**1**	**3**	133	56	44.3	8	35.0	0	0
Career		2	6	297	61	49.5	25	42.0	0	2
