= Cor'Dale Flott =

American football player (born 2001)

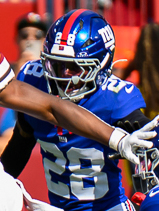
- Flott with the New York Giants in 2025

No. 18 – Tennessee Titans
- Position: Cornerback
- Roster status: Active

Personal information
- Born: August 24, 2001 (age 25); Saraland, Alabama, U.S.
- Listed height: 6 ft 2 in (1.88 m)
- Listed weight: 175 lb (79 kg)

Career information
- High school: Saraland
- College: LSU (2019–2021)
- NFL draft: 2022: 3rd round, 81st overall pick

Career history
- New York Giants (2022–2025); Tennessee Titans (2026–present)

Awards and highlights
- CFP national champion (2019)

Career NFL statistics as of Week 10, 2026
- Total tackles: 185
- Forced fumbles: 3
- Pass deflections: 29
- Interceptions: 5
- Stats at Pro Football Reference

Cor'Dale Flott (born August 24, 2001) is an American professional football cornerback for the Tennessee Titans of the National Football League (NFL). He played college football for the LSU Tigers.

== Early life ==
Flott grew up in Saraland, Alabama, and attended Saraland High School. He was rated a three-star recruit and initially committed to play college football at Auburn. Flott later decommitted and signed to play at LSU.

== College career ==
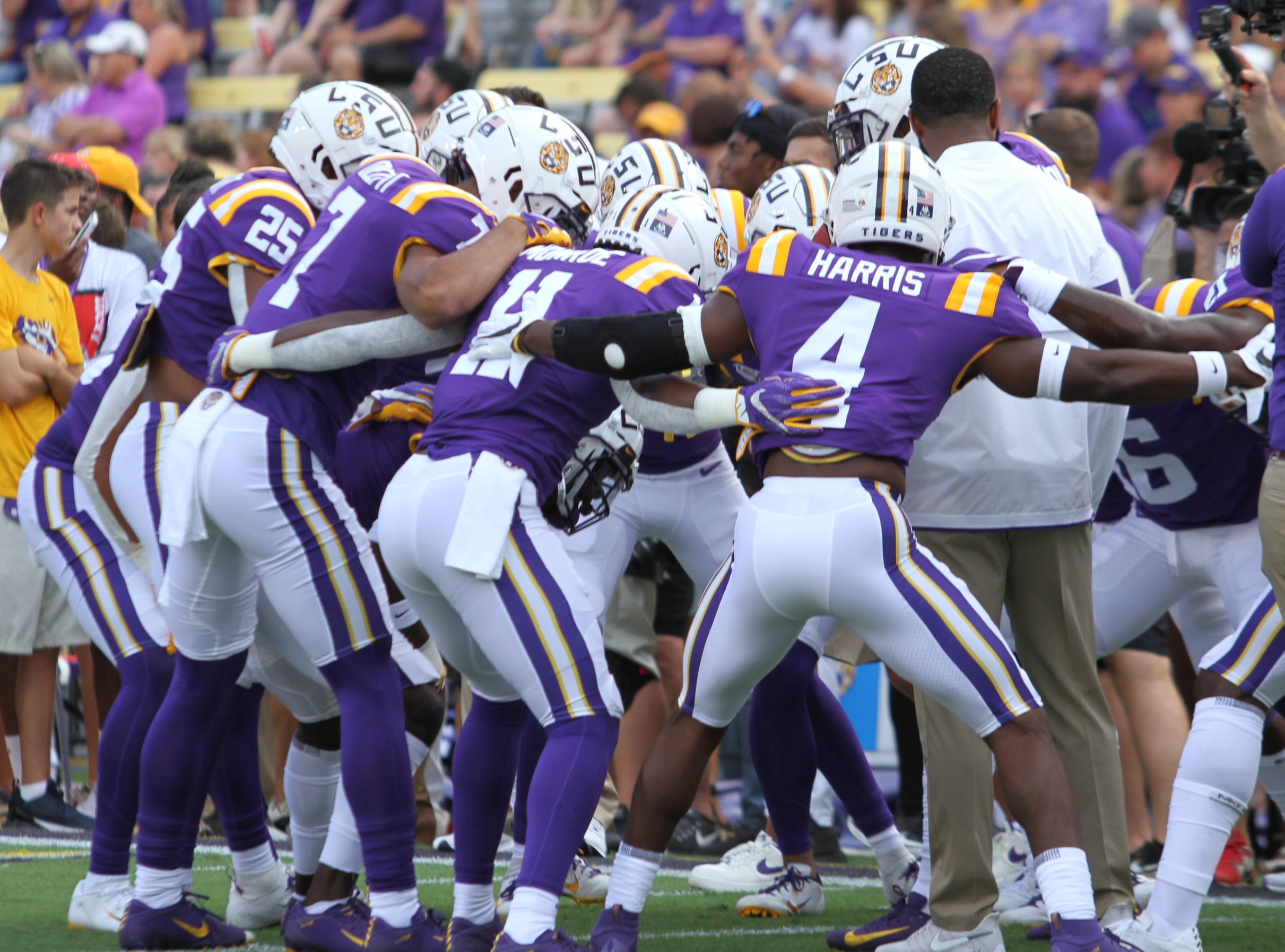
Flott #25 in defensive huddle at LSU

Flott played in 14 of LSU's games with one start as a freshman and had 15 tackles and four passes defended as the Tigers won the 2020 College Football Playoff National Championship. He became a starter going into his sophomore year and finished the season with 43 tackles, 4.5 tackles for loss, four passes broken up and one forced fumble. As a junior, Flott played in 11 games with 10 starts and had 41 tackles, four passes defended, and one interception. After the season, he announced that he would forgo his remaining collegiate eligibility and enter the 2022 NFL draft.

== Professional career ==
Pre-draft measurables
| Height | Weight | Arm length | Hand span | Wingspan | 40-yard dash | 10-yard split | 20-yard split | 20-yard shuttle | Three-cone drill | Vertical jump | Broad jump |
|---|---|---|---|---|---|---|---|---|---|---|---|
| 6 ft 0 1/2 in (1.84 m) | 175 lb (79 kg) | 30 1/8 in (0.77 m) | 8 in (0.20 m) | 6 ft 1 7/8 in (1.88 m) | 4.40 s | 1.56 s | 2.53 s | 4.10 s | 6.94 s | 34.0 in (0.86 m) | 10 ft 2 in (3.10 m) |
All values from NFL Combine/Pro Day

=== New York Giants ===
Flott was selected by the New York Giants with the 81st pick in the third round of the 2022 NFL draft. After Aaron Robinson had his appendix removed, Flott was named as a starting cornerback for the Giants' Week 2 matchup against the Carolina Panthers. As a rookie, he finished with 26 tackles, two passes defended, and one forced fumble in 11 games.

Flott started 14 games for New York during the 2025 season, compiling one interception, 11 pass deflections, one forced fumble, and 38 combined tackles. On January 3, 2026, Flott was placed on season-ending injured reserve due to a knee injury suffered in Week 16 against the Minnesota Vikings.

=== Tennessee Titans ===
On March 12, 2026, Flott signed a three-year, $45 million contract with the Tennessee Titans.

== NFL career statistics ==
Legend
| **Bold** | Career high |

=== Regular season ===
| Year | Team | Games | | Tackles | | | | | Interceptions | | | | | | Fumbles | | | | |
| Year | Team | GP | GS | Cmb | Solo | Ast | Sck | TFL | Int | Yds | Avg | Lng | TD | PD | FF | Fum | FR | Yds | TD |
|---|---|---|---|---|---|---|---|---|---|---|---|---|---|---|---|---|---|---|---|
| 2022 | NYG | 11 | 6 | 26 | 15 | 11 | 0.0 | 0 | 0 | 0 | 0.0 | 0 | 0 | 2 | **1** | 0 | 0 | 0 | 0 |
| 2023 | NYG | **14** | 7 | 36 | 25 | 11 | 0.0 | 0 | **1** | 21 | 21.0 | 21 | 0 | 5 | **1** | 0 | 0 | 0 | 0 |
| 2024 | NYG | **14** | 10 | **53** | **36** | **17** | 0.0 | 2 | **1** | 26 | 26.0 | 26 | 0 | 7 | 0 | 0 | 0 | 0 | 0 |
| 2025 | NYG | **14** | **14** | 38 | 27 | 11 | 0.0 | **3** | **1** | **68** | **68.0** | **68** | 0 | **11** | **1** | 0 | 0 | 0 | 0 |
| 2026 | TEN | 8 | 8 | 32 | 21 | 11 | 0.0 | 0 | 2 | 14 | 7.0 | 14 | 0 | 4 | 0 | 0 | 0 | 0 | 0 |
| Career | | 61 | 45 | 185 | 124 | 61 | 0.0 | 5 | 5 | 129 | 25.8 | 68 | 0 | 29 | 3 | 0 | 0 | 0 | 0 |

=== Postseason ===
| Year | Team | Games | | Tackles | | | | | Interceptions | | | | | | Fumbles | | | | |
| Year | Team | GP | GS | Cmb | Solo | Ast | Sck | TFL | Int | Yds | Avg | Lng | TD | PD | FF | Fum | FR | Yds | TD |
|---|---|---|---|---|---|---|---|---|---|---|---|---|---|---|---|---|---|---|---|
| 2022 | NYG | 2 | 0 | 0 | 0 | 0 | 0.0 | 0 | 0 | 0 | 0.0 | 0 | 0 | 1 | 0 | 0 | 0 | 0 | 0 |
| Career | | 2 | 0 | 0 | 0 | 0 | 0.0 | 0 | 0 | 0 | 0.0 | 0 | 0 | 1 | 0 | 0 | 0 | 0 | 0 |

== Personal life ==
Flott's cousin, Velus Jones Jr., plays in the NFL for the Seattle Seahawks.
