= Kwesi Adofo-Mensah =

American football executive (born 1981)

San Francisco 49ers
- Title: Vice President of Personnel & Strategy

Personal information
- Born: October 12, 1981 (age 45); Cherry Hill, New Jersey, U.S.

Career information
- College: Princeton

Career history
- San Francisco 49ers (2013–2016) Manager of football research & development; San Francisco 49ers (2017–2019) Director of football research & development; Cleveland Browns (2020–2021) Vice president of football operations; Minnesota Vikings (2022–2025) General manager; San Francisco 49ers (2026–present) Vice president of personnel & strategy
- Executive profile at Pro Football Reference

Kwesi Adofo-Mensah (born October 12, 1981) is an American professional football executive who is the vice president of personnel & strategy for the San Francisco 49ers of the National Football League (NFL). Adofo-Mensah previously served as the general manager of the Minnesota Vikings from 2022 until 2025. Before that, he was the vice president of football operations for the Cleveland Browns from 2020 to 2021 and also served in various executive roles for the 49ers from 2013 to 2019.

== Early life ==
A native of Cherry Hill, New Jersey, Adofo-Mensah attended and earned his bachelor's degree in economics from Princeton University, where he would also walk-on to the Princeton Tigers men's basketball junior varsity team. He earned his master's degree in economics from Stanford University. Before beginning with the NFL, Adofo-Mensah had several ventures as a portfolio manager and commodities trader on Wall Street.

== Executive career ==
=== San Francisco 49ers ===
In 2013, Adofo-Mensah began his NFL career with the San Francisco 49ers – under general manager Trent Baalke and head coach Jim Harbaugh – following a chance meeting with the team's executive vice president of football operations and NFL cap and contract manager Paraag Marathe. As manager of football research and development, Adofo-Mensah developed under Marathe, who is renowned for his cap management work in the NFL.

In 2017, Adofo-Mensah was retained under new general manager John Lynch and was promoted to director of football research and development.

=== Cleveland Browns ===
On May 15, 2020, Adofo-Mensah was hired by the Cleveland Browns as their vice president of football operations under general manager Andrew Berry.

=== Minnesota Vikings ===
On January 26, 2022, Adofo-Mensah was hired as the general manager of the Minnesota Vikings.

On May 30, 2025, Adofo-Mensah and the Vikings agreed to a multi-year contract extension.

On January 30, 2026, it was announced that Adofo-Mensah was being fired by the team despite signing a contract extension the year prior.

Kwesi was fired from the Vikings following several bad drafts. The first big mistake was in the disastrous 2022 NFL Draft, in which Adofo-Mensah traded the No. 12 overall pick to the Detroit Lions, a divisional rival, while losing overall value according to many draft experts. The only notable player drafted in the 2023 NFL Draft is Jordan Addison, who was drafted in Round 1. The 2024 NFL Draft included QB J.J. McCarthy (later traded away), who Adolfo-Mensah would later retain over QB Sam Darnold (2026 Super Bowl Champion).

=== San Francisco 49ers (second stint) ===
On February 24, 2026, the San Francisco 49ers hired Adofo-Mensah as a personnel executive.

== Personal life ==
He has Ghanaian ancestry.
