= Chandon Sullivan =

American football player (born 1996)

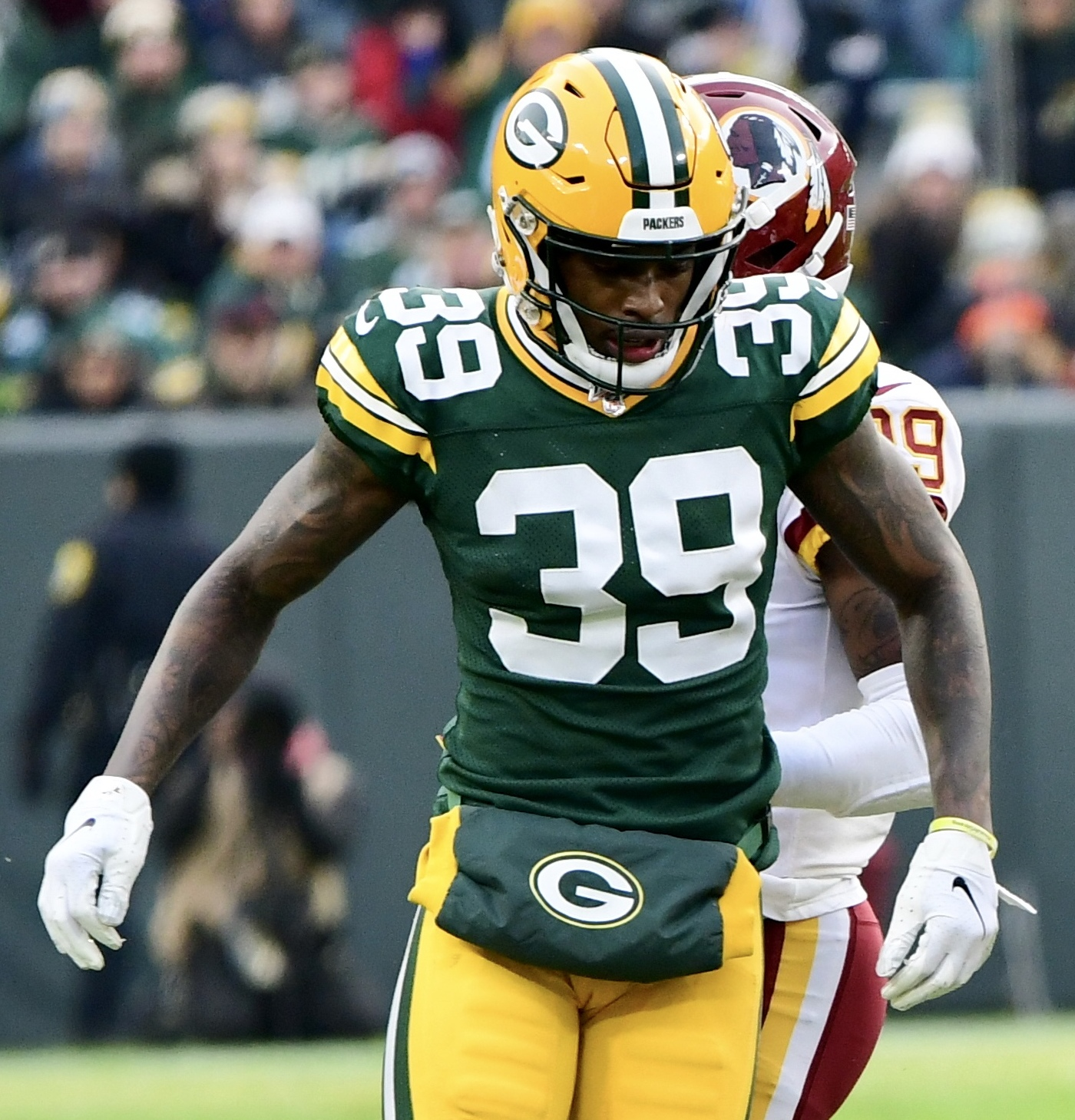
- Sullivan with the Green Bay Packers in 2019

Profile
- Position: Cornerback

Personal information
- Born: August 7, 1996 (age 30); Winder, Georgia, U.S.
- Listed height: 5 ft 11 in (1.80 m)
- Listed weight: 189 lb (86 kg)

Career information
- High school: Winder-Barrow
- College: Georgia State (2014–2017)
- NFL draft: 2018: undrafted

Career history
- Philadelphia Eagles (2018); Green Bay Packers (2019–2021); Minnesota Vikings (2022); Pittsburgh Steelers (2023)

Awards and highlights
- Third-team All-Sun Belt (2017)

Career NFL statistics
- Total tackles: 191
- Forced fumbles: 2
- Fumble recoveries: 1
- Pass deflections: 29
- Interceptions: 6
- Defensive touchdowns: 1
- Stats at Pro Football Reference

Chandon Lamar Sullivan (born August 7, 1996) is an American professional football cornerback. He played college football for the Georgia State Panthers.

== Early life ==
Sullivan was born on August 7, 1996, to Jannice and Dexter Sullivan. He attended Winder-Barrow High School where he played the positions of wide receiver and cornerback for the Bulldoggs football team. In his senior season, Sullivan made All-Region 8-AAAAA Second-team for his performances at cornerback and running back. As a senior, Sullivan received All-area honors by the Athens Banner-Herald. By the end of his senior season, Sullivan scored 10 touchdowns.

Just under six feet tall and weighing 180 lbs, Sullivan also played varsity basketball as a point guard and team captain.

Sullivan was rated a two-star recruiting prospect by 247Sports. He earned a Northeast Georgia FCA Scholarship and received offers from Presbyterian College, Charleston Southern and Georgia State.

== College career ==
Sullivan was a four-year starter for the Georgia State Panthers, appearing in 49 games and starting 44 of them. Over the course of his career, he set school records for interceptions (7) and pass breakups (25) and finished fifth in career tackles (182). As a senior, Sullivan became the first player in Georgia State history to be invited to the Senior Bowl as well as the team's first Academic All-American.

Sullivan graduated from Georgia State with a degree in journalism in 2017.

== Professional career ==
Pre-draft measurables
Height	Weight	Arm length	Hand span	40-yard dash	10-yard split	20-yard split	20-yard shuttle	Vertical jump	Broad jump	Bench press
5 ft 10 3/4 in (1.80 m)	194 lb (88 kg)	32 3/8 in (0.82 m)	9 in (0.23 m)	4.60 s	1.61 s	2.68 s	4.36 s	40.5 in (1.03 m)	11 ft 2 in (3.40 m)	15 reps
All values from NFL Combine

=== Philadelphia Eagles ===
Sullivan signed with the Philadelphia Eagles as an undrafted free agent on April 28, 2018. He failed to make the Eagles' 53-man roster out of training camp, but was subsequently signed to the team's practice squad on September 2. Sullivan was promoted to the active roster on October 25, 2018, after defensive end Derek Barnett was placed on injured reserve. Sullivan made his NFL debut on October 28, 2018, against the Jacksonville Jaguars, playing on special teams. Sullivan made his first career start on November 25, 2018, against the New York Giants, he made three tackles and deflected a pass before leaving the game due to injury. He was waived by the Eagles on December 24, 2018, and re-signed to the practice squad for the rest of the season and signed a reserve/future contract with the Eagles on January 14, 2019. In his rookie season, Sullivan played in five games (one start) and made seven tackles. He was waived on May 1, 2019.

=== Green Bay Packers ===
On May 6, 2019, Sullivan signed with the Green Bay Packers and made the team out of training camp. In week 5 against the Dallas Cowboys, Sullivan intercepted a pass from Dak Prescott in the 34–24 win. Sullivan played in all 16 of the Packers' regular season games and recorded 30 tackles with six passes defended, one interception, and one forced fumble while also playing in both of the team's playoff games with one start. On March 17, 2020, the Packers tendered Sullivan for one year as an exclusive rights free agent. He signed the tender on April 27, 2020.

On September 20, 2020, against the Detroit Lions Sullivan intercepted a pass thrown by Matthew Stafford on the Lions' seven-yard line and returned it for his first career touchdown during the 42–21 win.

The Packers placed a restricted free agent tender on Sullivan on March 17, 2021. He signed the one-year contract on April 23.

=== Minnesota Vikings ===
On March 25, 2022, Sullivan signed a one-year contract with the Minnesota Vikings. In the historic comeback win after trailing the Indianapolis Colts 33–0, Sullivan incurred a costly fifteen-yard penalty for unsportsmanlike conduct for tossing his helmet after learning in the endzone that his fumble recovery had not been ruled a fumble at all. In the first half, Sullivan had stripped a Colt of the football and taken it across the goal line but that play was ruled as not a fumble.

=== Pittsburgh Steelers ===
On May 2, 2023, Sullivan signed with the Pittsburgh Steelers.

== NFL career statistics ==
=== Regular season ===
Year	Team	Games		Tackles				Interceptions						Fumbles	
Year	Team	GP	GS	Comb	Total	Ast	Sck	PD	Int	Yds	Avg	Lng	TDs	FF	FR
2018	PHI	5	1	7	7	0	0.0	0	0	0	0	0	0	0	0
2019	GB	16	0	30	27	3	0.0	6	1	7	7.0	7	0	1	0
2020	GB	16	10	41	32	9	0.0	6	1	7	7.0	7	1	0	0
2021	GB	17	10	31	25	6	0.0	4	3	14	4.7	13	0	0	0
2022	MIN	17	10	60	45	15	0.0	7	0	0	0.0	0	0	0	1
2023	PIT	17	2	22	14	8	0.0	6	1	0	0.0	0	0	1	1
Career		88	33	192	150	41	0.0	29	6	28	4.7	13	1	2	1
Source: pro-football-reference.com

=== Postseason ===
Year	Team	Games		Tackles				Interceptions						Fumbles	
Year	Team	GP	GS	Comb	Total	Ast	Sck	PD	Int	Yds	Avg	Lng	TDs	FF	FR
2019	GB	2	1	1	1	0	0.0	0	0	0	0.0	0	0	0	0
2020	GB	2	2	13	10	3	0.0	0	0	0	0.0	0	0	0	0
2021	GB	1	0	3	3	0	0.0	0	0	0	0.0	0	0	0	0
2022	MIN	1	1	4	2	2	0.0	1	0	0	0.0	0	0	0	0
Career		6	4	21	16	5	0.0	1	0	0	0.0	0	0	0	0
Source: pro-football-reference.com
