= 2024 Carolina Panthers season =

30th season in franchise history

- Owner: David Tepper
- General manager: Dan Morgan
- Head coach: Dave Canales
- Home stadium: Bank of America Stadium

Results
- Record: 5–12
- Division place: 3rd NFC South
- Playoffs: Did not qualify
- Pro Bowlers: CB Jaycee Horn; G Robert Hunt

Uniform
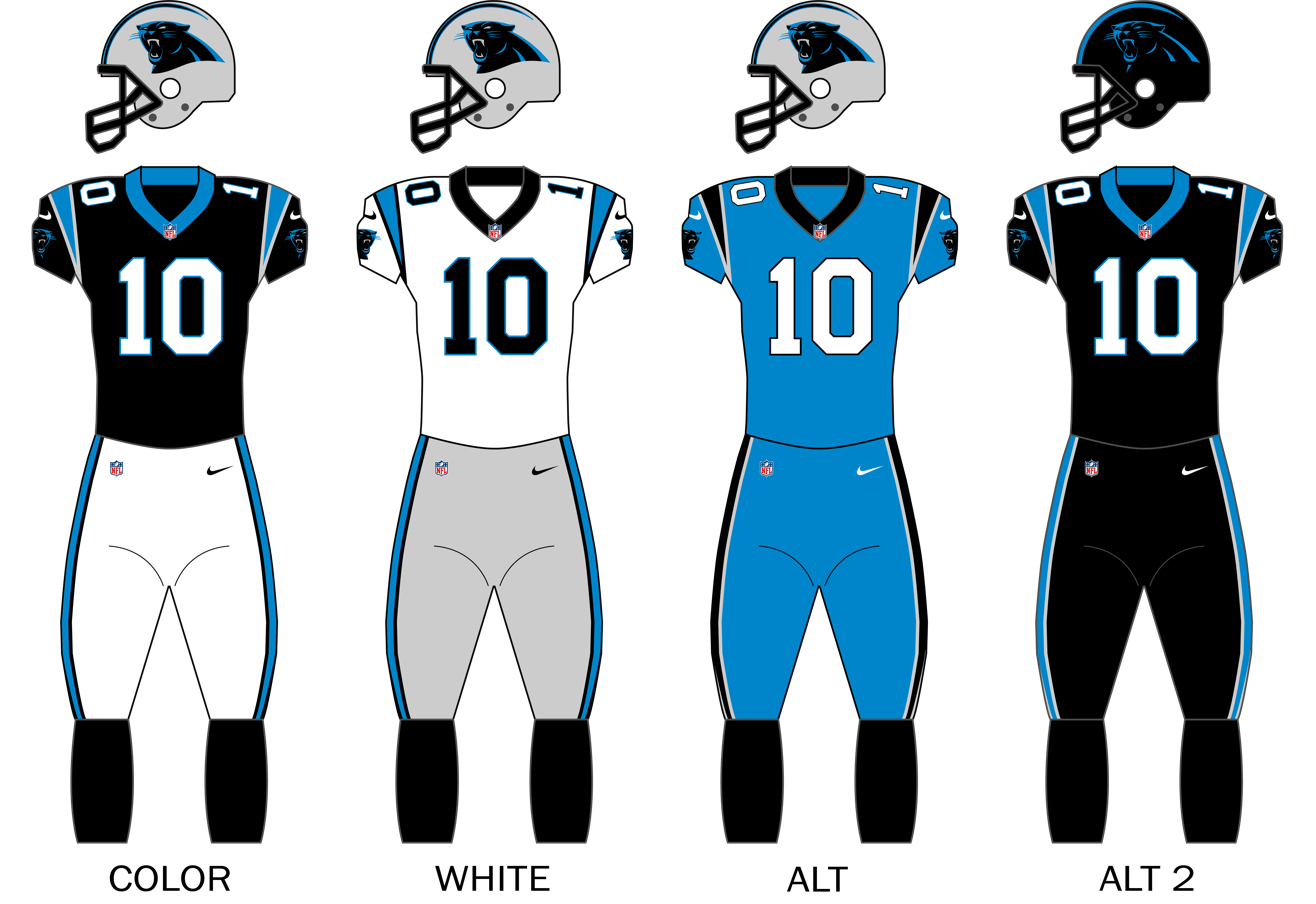

The 2024 season was the Carolina Panthers' 30th in the National Football League (NFL), their first under head coach Dave Canales and new general manager Dan Morgan. The Panthers started 1–7 for the second year in a row, but improved on their NFL-worst 2–15 record from last year following a Week 10 International victory against the New York Giants in overtime. However, they suffered their seventh consecutive losing season after a Week 13 loss to the Tampa Bay Buccaneers which was also in overtime. The Panthers were then eliminated from both NFC South title contention and playoff contention after a loss to the Dallas Cowboys in Week 15. The Panthers finished 3rd in the NFC South due to winning a strength of victory tiebreaker over their rival New Orleans Saints. This season began with the team's fourth head coach in six seasons.

With one of the worst defenses in NFL history, the Panthers set an NFL record for most points allowed in a season, with 534, breaking the record held by the 1981 Colts, which allowed 533, and had the worst point differential (−193). The team surrendered approximately 31.4 points per game on average, surpassing their 2019 season, at 29.4. The Panthers allowed 40 or more points in 3 games, allowed 30 or more points in 10 games, and allowed fewer than 20 points only once. The Panthers won only one game by more than one score, which was a 36–22 upset win over the Raiders.

== Offseason ==
=== Head coach ===
On January 25, 2024 the Panthers hired former Seattle Seahawks Quarterback coach and Tampa Bay Buccaneers offensive coordinator Dave Canales as their new head coach.

=== General manager ===
The Panthers fired third year general manager Scott Fitterer after their week 18 loss against the Tampa Bay Buccaneers. On January 22, 2024, Dan Morgan was promoted from assistant general manager to general manager and president of football operations.

=== Draft ===
2024 Carolina Panthers draft selections
Round	Selection	Player	Position	College	Notes
1	1	Traded to the Chicago Bears (Note: The Panthers traded a first-round selection (1st overall), 2023 first- and second-round selections, a 2025 second-round selection, and WR D. J. Moore to the Chicago Bears in exchange for a 2023 first-round selection (1st overall).)			
1	32	Xavier Legette	WR	South Carolina	From Chiefs via Bills (Note: The Panthers traded second- and fifth-round selections (33rd and 141st overall) to the Buffalo Bills in exchange for first- and sixth-round selections (32nd and 200th overall).)
2	33	Traded to the Buffalo Bills			
2	39	Traded to the Los Angeles Rams (Note: The Panthers traded a second-round selection (39th overall) to the Los Angeles Rams in exchange for second- and fifth-round selections (52nd and 155th overall) and a 2025 second-round selection.)			From Giants (Note: The Panthers traded a fifth-round selection (166th overall) and LB Brian Burns to the New York Giants in exchange for second- and fifth-round selections (39th and 141st overall), and a 2025 fifth-round selection.)
2	46	Jonathon Brooks	RB	Texas	From Colts (Note: The Panthers traded a second-round selection and two fifth-round selections (52nd, 142nd and 155th overall) to the Indianapolis Colts in exchange for a second-round selection (46th overall).)
2	52	Traded to the Indianapolis Colts			From Rams
3	65	Traded to the New York Jets (Note: The Panthers traded a third-round selection (65th overall) to the New York Jets in exchange for third- and fifth-round selections (72nd and 157th overall).)			
3	72	Trevin Wallace	LB	Kentucky	From Jets
4	101	Ja'Tavion Sanders	TE	Texas	
5	136	Traded to the Cleveland Browns (Note: The Panthers traded a fifth-round selection (136th overall) to the Cleveland Browns in exchange for QB Baker Mayfield.)			
5	141	Traded to the Buffalo Bills			From Giants
5	142	Traded to the Indianapolis Colts			From Titans (Note: The Panthers traded a seventh-round selection (221st overall) and OT Dennis Daley to the Tennessee Titans in exchange for a fifth-round selection (142nd overall).)
5	155	Traded to the Indianapolis Colts			From Steelers via Rams
5	157	Chau Smith-Wade	CB	Washington State	From Browns via Vikings and Jets
5	166	Traded to the New York Giants			From 49ers (Note: The Panthers traded RB Christian McCaffrey to the San Francisco 49ers in exchange for a fifth-round selection (166th overall), and 2023 second-, third- and fourth-round selections (61st, 93rd and 132nd overall).)
6	177	Traded to the Jacksonville Jaguars (Note: The Panthers traded a sixth-round selection (177th overall) and a 2023 seventh-round selection (226th overall) to the Jacksonville Jaguars in exchange for WR Laviska Shenault.)			
6	178	Traded to the Pittsburgh Steelers (Note: The Panthers traded a sixth-round selection (178th overall) and CB Donte Jackson to the Pittsburgh Steelers in exchange for a seventh-round selection (240th overall) and WR Diontae Johnson.)			From Cardinals (Note: The Panthers traded WR Robbie Chosen to the Arizona Cardinals in exchange for a sixth-round selection (178th overall) and a 2025 seventh-round selection.)
6	200	Jaden Crumedy	DT	Mississippi State	From Cowboys via Texans and Bills
7	221	Traded to the Tennessee Titans			
7	240	Michael Barrett	LB	Michigan	From Steelers

2024 Carolina Panthers undrafted free agents
Name	Position	College	Ref.
Popo Aumavae	DE	Oregon	
Jalen Coker	WR	Holy Cross	
Jeremiah Crawford	OT	Tennessee	
Willie Drew	CB	Virginia State	
Christian McDuffie	OT	Kansas State	
Kenny Dyson	OLB	Bryant	
Kevin Foelsch	TE	New Haven	
DeShawn Gaddie	CB	Ole Miss	
Darius Hodges	DE	Tulane	
Clayton Isbell	S	Coastal Carolina	
Derrick McLendon	OLB	Colorado	
Harrison Mevis	K	Missouri	
Jackson Mitchell	LB	UConn	
Sam Pinckney	WR	Coastal Carolina	
Jack Plummer	QB	Louisville	
Andrew Raym	C	Oklahoma	
Demani Richardson	S	Texas A&M	
Jaden Shirden	RB	Monmouth	
Ulumoo "MJ" Ale	DT	Washington	

Draft trades

== Staff ==
2024 Carolina Panthers staff
Front office: Owner – David Tepper; President – Kristi Coleman; President of football operations/general manager – Dan Morgan; Executive vice president of football operations – Brandt Tilis; Director of player personnel – Cole Spencer; Director of college scouting – Jared Kirksey; Assistant director of college scouting – Dave Whittington; VP of development/football administration – Brian Decker; Head coaches: Head coach – Dave Canales; Assistant head coach/run game coordinator – Harold Goodwin; Offensive coaches: Offensive coordinator – Brad Idzik; Passing game coordinator – Nate Carroll; Quarterbacks – Will Harriger; Running backs – Bernie Parmalee; Wide receivers – Rob Moore; Tight ends – Pat McPherson; Offensive line – Joe Gilbert; Assistant offensive line – Keli'i Kekuewa; Offensive assistant – Mike Bercovici; Offensive quality control – Dean Petzing	Defensive coaches: Defensive coordinator – Ejiro Evero; Defensive passing game coordinator – Jonathan Cooley; Defensive line – Todd Wash; Linebackers – Peter Hansen; Outside linebackers – Tem Lukabu; Secondary – Bert Watts; Assistant defensive backs – DeAngelo Hall; Senior defensive assistant – Dom Capers; Defensive assistant – Mayur Chaudhari; Defensive quality control – Bobby Maffei; Special teams coaches: Special teams coordinator – Tracy Smith; Assistant special teams coordinator – Daren Bates; Strength and conditioning: Head athletic trainer – Kevin King; Strength and conditioning – Jeremy Scott; Strength and conditioning assistant – Thomas Barbeau; Human performance assistant – Timothy Rabas

== Final roster ==
2024 Carolina Panthers roster
Quarterbacks (QB): 14 Andy Dalton; 16 Jack Plummer; 9 Bryce Young; Running backs (RB): 3 Raheem Blackshear; 34 Mike Boone; 6 Miles Sanders; Wide receivers (WR): 88 Dan Chisena; 18 Jalen Coker; 28 Velus Jones Jr.; 17 Xavier Legette; 83 David Moore; 19 Adam Thielen; 13 Deven Thompkins; Tight ends (TE): 84 Feleipe Franks; 0 Ja'Tavion Sanders; 82 Tommy Tremble	Offensive linemen (OL): 70 Brady Christensen C/T; 79 Ikem Ekwonu T; 50 Robert Hunt G; 61 Jarrett Kingston G; 68 Damien Lewis G; 64 Cade Mays C; 72 Taylor Moton T; 77 Yosh Nijman T; 62 Chandler Zavala G; Defensive linemen (DL): 96 Jaden Crumedy DE; 93 LaBryan Ray DE; 74 Sam Roberts DE; 94 A'Shawn Robinson DE; 99 Shy Tuttle NT; 75 DeShawn Williams DE	Linebackers (LB): 7 Jadeveon Clowney OLB; 45 Cam Gill OLB; 47 Josey Jewell ILB; 49 Jon Rhattigan ILB; 41 Jacoby Windmon ILB; 98 D. J. Wonnum OLB; 57 Chandler Wooten ILB; Defensive backs (DB): 27 Shemar Bartholomew CB; 29 Akayleb Evans CB; 31 Caleb Farley CB; 42 Sam Franklin Jr. SS; 20 Jordan Fuller FS; 8 Jaycee Horn CB; 26 Donte Jackson CB; 2 Mike Jackson CB; 32 Lonnie Johnson Jr. CB; 36 Demani Richardson FS; 21 Nick Scott FS; 25 Xavier Woods SS; Special teams (ST): 10 Johnny Hekker P; 44 J. J. Jansen LS; 4 Eddy Piñeiro K	Practice squad: 39 Emani Bailey RB; 65 Ja'Tyre Carter G; 46 Dominique Dafney TE; 55 Kenny Dyson OLB; 48 Thomas Incoom OLB; 11 Trenton Irwin WR; 15 T. J. Luther WR; 81 Jordan Matthews TE; 12 Dax Milne WR; 43 Jackson Mitchell OLB; 86 Praise Olatoke WR (IPP); 60 Andrew Raym C; 97 T. J. Smith NT; 85 Stephen Sullivan TE (PS/I); 73 Brandon Walton T; Reserve: 38 Amaré Barno OLB (IR); 24 Jonathon Brooks RB (IR); 95 Derrick Brown DE (IR); 53 Claudin Cherelus ILB (IR); 63 Austin Corbett C (IR); 30 Chuba Hubbard RB (IR); 52 D. J. Johnson OLB (NF-Inj.); 26 Chau Smith-Wade CB (IR); 80 Ian Thomas TE (IR); 54 Shaq Thompson ILB (IR); 56 Trevin Wallace ILB (IR); 92 Raequan Williams DE (IR); Rookies in italics 53 active, 12 reserve, 13 practice squad (2 exempt)

== Preseason ==
Week	Date	Opponent	Result	Record	Venue	Recap
1	August 8	at New England Patriots	L 3–17	0–1	Gillette Stadium	Recap
2	August 17	New York Jets	L 12–15	0–2	Bank of America Stadium	Recap
3	August 24	at Buffalo Bills	W 31–26	1–2	Highmark Stadium	Recap

== Regular season ==
=== Schedule ===
Week	Date	Opponent	Result	Record	Venue	Recap
1	September 8	at **New Orleans Saints**	**L** 10–47	0–1	Caesars Superdome	Recap
2	September 15	Los Angeles Chargers	**L** 3–26	0–2	Bank of America Stadium	Recap
3	September 22	at Las Vegas Raiders	**W** 36–22	1–2	Allegiant Stadium	Recap
4	September 29	Cincinnati Bengals	**L** 24–34	1–3	Bank of America Stadium	Recap
5	October 6	at Chicago Bears	**L** 10–36	1–4	Soldier Field	Recap
6	October 13	**Atlanta Falcons**	**L** 20–38	1–5	Bank of America Stadium	Recap
7	October 20	at Washington Commanders	**L** 7–40	1–6	Northwest Stadium	Recap
8	October 27	at Denver Broncos	**L** 14–28	1–7	Empower Field at Mile High	Recap
9	November 3	**New Orleans Saints**	**W** 23–22	2–7	Bank of America Stadium	Recap
10	November 10	New York Giants	**W** 20–17 (OT)	3–7	(Germany) Allianz Arena (Munich)	Recap
11	Bye					
12	November 24	Kansas City Chiefs	**L** 27–30	3–8	Bank of America Stadium	Recap
13	December 1	**Tampa Bay Buccaneers**	**L** 23–26 (OT)	3–9	Bank of America Stadium	Recap
14	December 8	at Philadelphia Eagles	**L** 16–22	3–10	Lincoln Financial Field	Recap
15	December 15	Dallas Cowboys	**L** 14–30	3–11	Bank of America Stadium	Recap
16	December 22	Arizona Cardinals	**W** 36–30 (OT)	4–11	Bank of America Stadium	Recap
17	December 29	at **Tampa Bay Buccaneers**	**L** 14–48	4–12	Raymond James Stadium	Recap
18	January 5	at **Atlanta Falcons**	**W** 44–38 (OT)	5–12	Mercedes-Benz Stadium	Recap

Note: Intra-division opponents are in bold text.

=== Game summaries ===
==== Week 1: at New Orleans Saints ====
Week 1: Carolina Panthers at New Orleans Saints – Game summary

Quarter	1	2	3	4	Total
Panthers	0	3	7	0	**10**
**Saints**	17	13	7	10	**47**

at Caesars Superdome, New Orleans, Louisiana

- Date: September 8
- Game time: 1:00 p.m. EDT/12:00 p.m. CDT
- Game weather: None (indoor stadium)
- Game attendance: 70,007
- Referee: Alan Eck
- TV announcers (Fox): Chris Myers, Mark Schlereth and Jen Hale
- Recap, Game Book

Game information

**First quarter**

- NO – Rashid Shaheed 59-yard pass from Derek Carr (Blake Grupe kick), 12:08. Saints 7–0. **Drive: 5 plays, 76 yards, 2:52.**
- NO – Blake Grupe 57-yard field goal, 10:04. Saints 10–0. **Drive: 4 plays, 1 yard, 1:50.**
- NO – Foster Moreau 3-yard pass from Derek Carr (Blake Grupe kick), 1:23. Saints 17–0. **Drive: 11 plays, 79 yards, 5:38.**

**Second quarter**

- NO – Blake Grupe 44-yard field goal, 7:03. Saints 20–0. **Drive: 9 plays, 48 yards, 5:07.**
- NO – Blake Grupe 52-yard field goal, 2:08. Saints 23–0. **Drive: 7 plays, 9 yards, 3:57.**
- NO – Juwan Johnson 16-yard pass from Derek Carr (Blake Grupe kick), 1:18. Saints 30–0. **Drive: 1 play, 16 yards, 0:06.**
- CAR – Eddy Piñeiro 43-yard field goal, 0:00. Saints 30–3. **Drive: 8 plays, 45 yards, 1:18.**

**Third quarter**

- NO – Alvin Kamara 1-yard run (Blake Grupe kick), 8:27. Saints 37–3. **Drive: 9 plays, 57 yards, 5:26.**
- CAR – Bryce Young 3-yard run (Eddy Piñeiro kick), 4:55. Saints 37–10. **Drive: 8 plays, 75 yards, 3:32.**

**Fourth quarter**

- NO – Blake Grupe 39-yard field goal, 13:08. Saints 40–10. **Drive: 12 plays, 43 yards, 6:47.**
- NO – Jamaal Williams 14-yard run (Blake Grupe kick), 10:38. Saints 47–10. **Drive: 2 plays, 36 yards, 0:43.**

**Top passers**

- CAR – Bryce Young – 13/30, 161 yards, 2 INT
- NO – Derek Carr – 19/23, 200 yards, 3 TD

**Top rushers**

- CAR – Miles Sanders – 5 rushes, 22 yards
- NO – Alvin Kamara – 15 rushes, 83 yards, TD

**Top receivers**

- CAR – Adam Thielen – 3 receptions, 49 yards
- NO – Rashid Shaheed – 3 receptions, 73 yards, TD

In the season opener, the Panthers lost to New Orleans 10–47. They started the season 0–1.

==== Week 2: vs. Los Angeles Chargers ====
Week 2: Los Angeles Chargers at Carolina Panthers – Game summary

Quarter	1	2	3	4	Total
**Chargers**	6	14	3	3	**26**
Panthers	0	0	3	0	**3**

at Bank of America Stadium, Charlotte, North Carolina

- Date: September 15
- Game time: 1:00 p.m. EDT
- Game weather: Cloudy, 78 °F (26 °C)
- Game attendance: 70,145
- Referee: Brad Rogers
- TV announcers (CBS): Tom McCarthy, Jay Feely and Amanda Balionis
- Recap, Game Book

Game information

**First quarter**

- LAC – Quentin Johnston 29-yard pass from Justin Herbert (kick failed, wide left), 9:20. Chargers 6–0. **Drive: 9 plays, 67 yards, 5:40.**

**Second quarter**

- LAC – Quentin Johnston 5-yard pass from Justin Herbert (Cameron Dicker kick), 4:16. Chargers 13–0. **Drive: 11 plays, 65 yards, 6:01.**
- LAC – J. K. Dobbins 43-yard run (Cameron Dicker kick), 2:01. Chargers 20–0. **Drive: 3 plays, 52 yards, 1:26.**

**Third quarter**

- CAR – Eddy Piñeiro 38-yard field goal, 12:18. Chargers 20–3. **Drive: 6 plays, 40 yards, 2:42.**
- LAC – Cameron Dicker 46-yard field goal, 9:03. Chargers 23–3. **Drive: 6 plays, 37 yards, 3:15.**

**Fourth quarter**

- LAC – Cameron Dicker 42-yard field goal, 11:02. Chargers 26–3. **Drive: 10 plays, 52 yards, 4:00.**

**Top passers**

- LAC – Justin Herbert – 14/20, 130 yards, 2 TD, INT
- CAR – Bryce Young – 18/26, 84 yards, INT

**Top rushers**

- LAC – J. K. Dobbins – 17 rushes, 131 yards, TD
- CAR – Chuba Hubbard – 10 rushes, 64 yards

**Top receivers**

- LAC – Quentin Johnston – 5 receptions, 51 yards, TD
- CAR – Tommy Tremble – 3 receptions, 23 yards

In the home opener, Carolina lost to the Chargers 3–26. They fell to 0–2. The Panthers accumulated only 159 total yards of offense while allowing a whopping 349.

===== Young benched for Dalton =====
The next day, head coach Dave Canales benched QB Bryce Young in favor of backup veteran Andy Dalton. Sources reported that Young was shocked by the switch, while Dalton, speaking to the media afterwards, expressed excitement at the opportunity to step into the starting role ahead of their Week 3 matchup against the Raiders.

===== Roster moves =====
On September 17, the Panthers signed TE Feleipe Franks to the active roster, released TE Jordan Matthews, and waived OLB Eku Leota.

==== Week 3: at Las Vegas Raiders ====
Week 3: Carolina Panthers at Las Vegas Raiders – Game summary

Quarter	1	2	3	4	Total
**Panthers**	7	14	6	9	**36**
Raiders	7	0	0	15	**22**

at Allegiant Stadium, Paradise, Nevada

- Date: September 22
- Game time: 4:05 p.m. EDT/1:05 p.m. PDT
- Game weather: None (indoor stadium)
- Game attendance: 62,417
- Referee: Bill Vinovich
- TV announcers (CBS): Spero Dedes, Adam Archuleta and Aditi Kinkhabwala
- Recap, Game Book

Game information

**First quarter**

- CAR – Chuba Hubbard 6-yard pass from Andy Dalton (Eddy Piñeiro kick), 10:13. Panthers 7–0. **Drive: 9 plays, 70 yards, 4:47.**
- LV – Alexander Mattison 2-yard run (Daniel Carlson kick), 0:24. Tied 7–7. **Drive: 10 plays, 97 yards, 5:24.**

**Second quarter**

- CAR – Diontae Johnson 5-yard pass from Andy Dalton (Eddy Piñeiro kick), 9:28. Panthers 14–7. **Drive: 10 plays, 75 yards, 5:56.**
- CAR – Adam Thielen 31-yard pass from Andy Dalton (Eddy Piñeiro kick), 0:28. Panthers 21–7. **Drive: 4 plays, 68 yards, 0:44.**

**Third quarter**

- CAR – Eddy Piñeiro 43-yard field goal, 9:59. Panthers 24–7. **Drive: 7 plays, 41 yards, 3:22.**
- CAR – Eddy Piñeiro 35-yard field goal, 4:46. Panthers 27–7. **Drive: 6 plays, 20 yards, 3:28.**

**Fourth quarter**

- CAR – Miles Sanders 1-yard run (pass failed), 13:33. Panthers 33–7. **Drive: 11 plays, 84 yards, 4:52.**
- LV – Jakobi Meyers 13-yard pass from Gardner Minshew (Gardner Minshew–Jakobi Meyers pass), 10:56. Panthers 33–15. **Drive: 7 plays, 70 yards, 2:37.**
- CAR – Eddy Piñeiro 26-yard field goal, 4:47. Panthers 36–15. **Drive: 7 plays, 28 yards, 3:47.**
- LV – Tre Tucker 8-yard pass from Aidan O'Connell (Daniel Carlson kick), 0:56. Panthers 36–22. **Drive: 13 plays, 70 yards, 3:51.**

**Top passers**

- CAR – Andy Dalton – 26/37, 319 yards, 3 TD
- LV – Gardner Minshew – 18/28, 214 yards, TD, INT

**Top rushers**

- CAR – Chuba Hubbard – 21 rushes, 114 yards
- LV – Zamir White – 10 rushes, 34 yards

**Top receivers**

- CAR – Diontae Johnson – 8 receptions, 122 yards, TD
- LV – Tre Tucker – 7 receptions, 96 yards, TD

After starting the season 0–2, veteran Andy Dalton was named starting quarterback for week three. In Dalton's first start, the Panthers looked nothing like the team who got outscored 73–13 in the previous two games. In the first quarter, Andy Dalton passed it to Chuba Hubbard for a touchdown. However, the Raiders tied the game at the end of the quarter. Carolina scored two touchdowns in the second and went into halftime with a 21–7 lead. Eddy Piñeiro kicked two field goals in the third. In the fourth quarter, Diontae Johnson scored a touchdown, but their attempt for a two-point conversion failed. The Raiders answered with Gardner Minshew throwing it to Jakobi Meyers for a touchdown. Piñeriro kicked another field goal for Carolina. Las Vegas scored another touchdown to reach the final score of 36–22. The Panthers picked up their first win of the season, improving to 1–2.

==== Week 4: vs. Cincinnati Bengals ====
Week 4: Cincinnati Bengals at Carolina Panthers – Game summary

Quarter	1	2	3	4	Total
**Bengals**	7	14	10	3	**34**
Panthers	0	14	7	3	**24**

at Bank of America Stadium, Charlotte, North Carolina

- Date: September 29
- Game time: 1:00 p.m. EDT
- Game weather: Mostly cloudy, 78 °F (26 °C)
- Game attendance: 72,258
- Referee: Adrian Hill
- TV announcers (Fox): Kevin Kugler, Daryl Johnston and Laura Okmin
- Recap, Game Book

Game information

**First quarter**

- CIN – Chase Brown 3-yard run (Evan McPherson kick), 0:05. Bengals 7–0. **Drive: 5 plays, 16 yards, 2:04.**

**Second quarter**

- CAR – Chuba Hubbard 3-yard run (Eddy Piñeiro kick), 9:31. Tied 7–7. **Drive: 11 plays, 70 yards, 5:34.**
- CIN – Ja'Marr Chase 63-yard pass from Joe Burrow (Evan McPherson kick), 7:14. Bengals 14–7. **Drive: 4 plays, 81 yards, 2:17.**
- CAR – Xavier Legette 8-yard pass from Andy Dalton (Eddy Piñeiro kick), 1:09. Tied 14–14. **Drive: 11 plays, 70 yards, 6:05.**
- CIN – Zack Moss 1-yard pass from Joe Burrow (Evan McPherson kick), 0:01. Bengals 21–14. **Drive: 8 plays, 66 yards, 1:08.**

**Third quarter**

- CIN – Chase Brown 1-yard run (Evan McPherson kick), 10:38. Bengals 28–14. **Drive: 8 plays, 71 yards, 4:22.**
- CIN – Evan McPherson 56-yard field goal, 2:52. Bengals 31–14. **Drive: 5 plays, −3 yards, 2:26.**
- CAR – Diontae Johnson 21-yard pass from Andy Dalton (Eddy Piñeiro kick), 0:53. Bengals 31–21. **Drive: 5 plays, 70 yards, 1:59.**

**Fourth quarter**

- CAR – Eddy Piñeiro 48-yard field goal, 7:42. Bengals 31–24. **Drive: 8 plays, 29 yards, 3:46.**
- CIN – Evan McPherson 46-yard field goal, 1:14. Bengals 34–24. **Drive: 9 plays, 35 yards, 3:09.**

**Top passers**

- CIN – Joe Burrow – 22/31, 232 yards, 2 TD, INT
- CAR – Andy Dalton – 25/40, 220 yards, 2 TD, INT

**Top rushers**

- CIN – Chase Brown – 15 rushes, 80 yards, 2 TD
- CAR – Chuba Hubbard – 18 rushes, 104 yards, TD

**Top receivers**

- CIN – Ja'Marr Chase – 3 receptions, 85 yards, TD
- CAR – Diontae Johnson – 7 receptions, 83 yards, TD

Carolina loses to Cincinnati 24–34. They fall to 1–3.

==== Week 5: at Chicago Bears ====
Week 5: Carolina Panthers at Chicago Bears – Game summary

Quarter	1	2	3	4	Total
Panthers	7	0	3	0	**10**
**Bears**	7	20	3	6	**36**

at Soldier Field, Chicago, Illinois

- Date: October 6
- Game time: 1:00 p.m. EDT/12:00 p.m. CDT
- Game weather: Sunny, 74 °F (23 °C)
- Game attendance: 59,307
- Referee: Tra Blake
- TV announcers (Fox): Kenny Albert, Jonathan Vilma and Megan Olivi
- Recap, Game Book

Game information

**First quarter**

- CAR – Chuba Hubbard 38-yard run (Eddy Piñeiro kick), 8:54. Panthers 7–0. **Drive: 5 plays, 51 yards, 2:45.**
- CHI – D. J. Moore 34-yard pass from Caleb Williams (Cairo Santos kick), 5:44. Tied 7–7. **Drive: 7 plays, 70 yards, 3:10.**

**Second quarter**

- CHI – Roschon Johnson 1-yard run (Cairo Santos kick), 10:44. Bears 14–7. **Drive: 13 plays, 80 yards, 6:27.**
- CHI – D'Andre Swift 1-yard run (Cairo Santos kick), 2:14. Bears 21–7. **Drive: 3 plays, 44 yards, 0:35.**
- CHI – D. J. Moore 30-yard pass from Caleb Williams (kick failed, wide right), 0:24. Bears 27–7. **Drive: 5 plays, 62 yards, 0:31.**

**Third quarter**

- CHI – Cairo Santos 33-yard field goal, 6:25. Bears 30–7. **Drive: 11 plays, 51 yards, 4:37.**
- CAR – Eddy Piñeiro 27-yard field goal, 2:10. Bears 30–10. **Drive: 10 plays, 61 yards, 4:15.**

**Fourth quarter**

- CHI – Roschon Johnson 1-yard run (pass failed), 4:23. Bears 36–10. **Drive: 5 plays, 18 yards, 3:07.**

**Top passers**

- CAR – Andy Dalton – 18/28, 136 yards, INT
- CHI – Caleb Williams – 20/29, 304 yards, 2 TD

**Top rushers**

- CAR – Chuba Hubbard – 13 rushes, 97 yards, TD
- CHI – D'Andre Swift – 21 rushes, 73 yards, TD

**Top receivers**

- CAR – Jalen Coker – 4 receptions, 68 yards
- CHI – D. J. Moore – 5 receptions, 105 yards, 2 TD

With their fourth straight loss to Chicago, the Panthers fell to 1–4.

==== Week 6: vs. Atlanta Falcons ====
Week 6: Atlanta Falcons at Carolina Panthers – Game summary

Quarter	1	2	3	4	Total
**Falcons**	7	15	6	10	**38**
Panthers	7	10	3	0	**20**

at Bank of America Stadium, Charlotte, North Carolina

- Date: October 13
- Game time: 4:25 p.m. EDT
- Game weather: Sunny, 79 °F (26 °C)
- Game attendance: 70,884
- Referee: Clay Martin
- TV announcers (Fox): Chris Myers, Mark Sanchez and Kristina Pink
- Recap, Game Book

Game information

**First quarter**

- CAR – Diontae Johnson 10-yard pass from Andy Dalton (Eddy Piñeiro kick), 5:56. Panthers 7–0. **Drive: 12 plays, 67 yards, 6:33.**
- ATL – Bijan Robinson 5-yard run (Younghoe Koo kick), 0:38. Tied 7–7. **Drive: 12 plays, 70 yards, 5:18.**

**Second quarter**

- CAR – Eddy Piñeiro 24-yard field goal, 8:48. Panthers 10–7. **Drive: 8 plays, 36 yards, 3:21.**
- ATL – Bijan Robinson 7-yard run (Tyler Allgeier run), 6:03. Falcons 15–10. **Drive: 5 plays, 76 yards, 2:45.**
- ATL – Drake London 3-yard pass from Kirk Cousins (Younghoe Koo kick), 1:42. Falcons 22–10. **Drive: 5 plays, 27 yards, 1:17.**
- CAR – Xavier Legette 7-yard pass from Andy Dalton (Eddy Piñeiero kick), 0:07. Falcons 22–17. **Drive: 8 plays, 76 yards, 1:35.**

**Third quarter**

- ATL – Younghoe Koo 21-yard field goal, 10:04. Falcons 25–17. **Drive: 11 plays, 67 yards, 4:56.**
- CAR – Eddy Piñeiro 40-yard field goal, 4:51. Falcons 25–20. **Drive: 11 plays, 48 yards, 5:13.**
- ATL – Younghoe Koo 37-yard field goal, 0:07. Falcons 28–20. **Drive: 10 plays, 57 yards, 4:44.**

**Fourth quarter**

- ATL – Tyler Allgeier 2-yard run (Younghoe Koo kick), 5:38. Falcons 35–20. **Drive: 9 plays, 84 yards, 5:09.**
- ATL – Younghoe Koo 35-yard field goal, 2:11. Falcons 38–20. **Drive: 6 plays, 19 yards, 1:58.**

**Top passers**

- ATL – Kirk Cousins – 19/30, 225 yards, TD
- CAR – Andy Dalton – 26/38, 221 yards, 2 TD, 2 INT

**Top rushers**

- ATL – Tyler Allgeier – 18 rushes, 105 yards, TD
- CAR – Chuba Hubbard – 18 rushes, 92 yards

**Top receivers**

- ATL – Drake London – 6 receptions, 74 yards, TD
- CAR – Diontae Johnson – 6 receptions, 78 yards, TD

Carolina loses to Atlanta 38–20. They fall to 1–5.

==== Week 7: at Washington Commanders ====
Week 7: Carolina Panthers at Washington Commanders – Game summary

Quarter	1	2	3	4	Total
Panthers	0	0	0	7	**7**
**Commanders**	10	17	10	3	**40**

at Northwest Stadium, Landover, Maryland

- Date: October 20
- Game time: 4:05 p.m. EDT
- Game weather: Sunny, 76 °F (24 °C)
- Game attendance: 63,380
- Referee: Carl Cheffers
- TV announcers (CBS): Ian Eagle, Charles Davis and Evan Washburn
- Recap, Game Book

Game information

**First quarter**

- WAS – Dante Fowler Jr. 67-yard interception return (Austin Seibert kick), 11:14. Commanders 7–0.
- WAS – Austin Seibert 23-yard field goal, 3:18. Commanders 10–0. **Drive: 11 plays, 85 yards, 6:20.**

**Second quarter**

- WAS – Brian Robinson Jr. 8-yard run (Austin Seibert kick), 11:35. Commanders 17–0. **Drive: 4 plays, 59 yards, 1:47.**
- WAS – Austin Seibert 49-yard field goal, 5:39. Commanders 20–0. **Drive: 5 plays, 7 yards, 1:53.**
- WAS – Zach Ertz 12-yard pass from Marcus Mariota (Austin Seibert kick), 0:10. Commanders 27–0. **Drive: 8 plays, 92 yards, 2:12.**

**Third quarter**

- WAS – Ben Sinnott 3-yard pass from Marcus Mariota (Austin Seibert kick), 8:53. Commanders 34–0. **Drive: 10 plays, 59 yards, 6:07.**
- WAS – Austin Seibert 31-yard field goal, 1:33. Commanders 37–0. **Drive: 10 plays, 55 yards, 5:36.**

**Fourth quarter**

- CAR – Chuba Hubbard 4-yard run (Eddy Piñeiro kick), 11:38. Commanders 37–7. **Drive: 9 plays, 70 yards, 4:55.**
- WAS – Austin Seibert 29-yard field goal, 4:55. Commanders 40–7. **Drive: 12 plays, 59 yards, 6:43.**

**Top passers**

- CAR – Andy Dalton – 11/16, 93 yards, 2 INT
- WAS – Marcus Mariota – 18/23, 205 yards, 2 TD

**Top rushers**

- CAR – Chuba Hubbard – 17 rushes, 52 yards, TD
- WAS – Brian Robinson Jr. – 12 rushes, 71 yards, TD

**Top receivers**

- CAR – Ja'Tavion Sanders – 6 receptions, 61 yards
- WAS – Terry McLaurin – 6 receptions, 98 yards

The Panthers were scoreless for the first three quarters of the game, but they managed to avoid being shutout by the Commanders by scoring a touchdown in the fourth. Washington won 40–7 and Carolina fell to 1–6.

==== Week 8: at Denver Broncos ====
Week 8: Carolina Panthers at Denver Broncos – Game summary

Quarter	1	2	3	4	Total
Panthers	7	0	0	7	**14**
**Broncos**	0	21	7	0	**28**

at Empower Field at Mile High, Denver, Colorado

- Date: October 27
- Game time: 4:25 p.m. EDT/2:25 p.m. MDT
- Game weather: Mostly cloudy, 76 °F (24 °C)
- Game attendance: 76,135
- Referee: Alex Kemp
- TV announcers (CBS): Chris Lewis, Jason McCourty and Amanda Guerra
- Recap, Game Book

Game information

**First quarter**

- CAR – Xavier Legette 6-yard pass from Bryce Young (Eddy Piñeiro kick), 7:12. Panthers 7–0. **Drive: 10 plays, 49 yards, 6:27.**

**Second quarter**

- DEN – Nate Adkins 3-yard pass from Bo Nix (Wil Lutz kick), 12:29. Tied 7–7. **Drive: 7 plays, 55 yards, 2:55.**
- DEN – Adam Trautman 19-yard pass from Bo Nix (Wil Lutz kick), 6:51. Broncos 14–7. **Drive: 7 plays, 92 yards, 3:06.**
- DEN – Bo Nix 1-yard run (Wil Lutz kick), 1:12. Broncos 21–7. **Drive: 10 plays, 48 yards, 3:29.**

**Third quarter**

- DEN – Jaleel McLaughlin 9-yard pass from Bo Nix (Wil Lutz kick), 6:49. Broncos 28–7. **Drive: 4 plays, 23 yards, 1:35.**

**Fourth quarter**

- CAR – Jalen Coker 15-yard pass from Bryce Young (Eddy Piñeiro kick), 0:18. Broncos 28–14. **Drive: 10 plays, 98 yards, 1:55.**

**Top passers**

- CAR – Bryce Young – 24/37, 224 yards, 2 TD, 2 INT
- DEN – Bo Nix – 28/37, 284 yards, 3 TD

**Top rushers**

- CAR – Chuba Hubbard – 15 rushes, 56 yards
- DEN – Jaleel McLaughlin – 8 rushes, 47 yards

**Top receivers**

- CAR – Jalen Coker – 4 receptions, 78 yards, TD
- DEN – Courtland Sutton – 8 receptions, 100 yards

Bryce Young is back to be starting quarterback after Andy Dalton sprained his thumb in a car accident days before the game. Denver defeats the Panthers 28–14. Carolina falls to 1–7.

==== Week 9: vs. New Orleans Saints ====
Week 9: New Orleans Saints at Carolina Panthers – Game summary

Quarter	1	2	3	4	Total
Saints	6	7	3	6	**22**
**Panthers**	0	10	7	6	**23**

at Bank of America Stadium, Charlotte, North Carolina

- Date: November 3
- Game time: 1:00 p.m. EST
- Game weather: Mostly sunny, 66 °F (19 °C)
- Game attendance: 70,292
- Referee: Ronald Torbert
- TV announcers (CBS): Tom McCarthy, Jay Feely and Amanda Balionis
- Recap, Game Book

Game information

**First quarter**

- NO – Blake Grupe 29-yard field goal, 10:51. Saints 3–0. **Drive: 10 plays, 67 yards, 4:09.**
- NO – Blake Grupe 33-yard field goal, 3:08. Saints 6–0. **Drive: 11 plays, 72 yards, 5:07.**

**Second quarter**

- CAR – Xavier Legette 3-yard pass from Bryce Young (Eddy Piñeiro kick), 9:59. Panthers 7–6. **Drive: 8 plays, 40 yards, 4:50.**
- NO – Taysom Hill 7-yard run (Blake Grupe kick), 4:13. Saints 13–7. **Drive: 9 plays, 78 yards, 5:46.**
- CAR – Eddy Piñeiro 48-yard field goal, 0:38. Saints 13–10. **Drive: 4 plays, −2 yards, 0:39.**

**Third quarter**

- CAR – Chuba Hubbard 1-yard run (Eddy Piñeiro kick), 9:55. Panthers 17–13. **Drive: 9 plays, 86 yards, 5:05.**
- NO – Blake Grupe 51-yard field goal, 4:15. Panthers 17–16. **Drive: 12 plays, 37 yards, 5:40.**

**Fourth quarter**

- NO – Foster Moreau 17-yard pass from Derek Carr (pass failed), 11:55. Saints 22–17. **Drive: 11 plays, 70 yards, 5:40.**
- CAR – Chuba Hubbard 16-yard run (pass failed), 2:18. Panthers 23–22. **Drive: 4 plays, 64 yards, 1:08.**

**Top passers**

- NO – Derek Carr – 18/31, 236 yards, TD
- CAR – Bryce Young – 16/26, 171 yards, TD, INT

**Top rushers**

- NO – Alvin Kamara – 29 rushes, 155 yards
- CAR – Chuba Hubbard – 15 rushes, 72 yards, 2 TD

**Top receivers**

- NO – Alvin Kamara – 6 receptions, 60 yards
- CAR – Ja'Tavion Sanders – 4 receptions, 87 yards

Carolina squeezes by New Orleans, 23–22. The Panthers improve to 2–7.

==== Week 10: vs. New York Giants ====
NFL Germany games

Week 10: New York Giants at Carolina Panthers – Game summary

Quarter	1	2	3	4	OT	Total
Giants	0	0	7	10	0	**17**
**Panthers**	7	3	7	0	3	**20**

at Allianz Arena, Munich, Bavaria, Germany

- Date: November 10
- Game time: 3:30 p.m. CET/9:30 a.m. EST
- Game weather: Mostly cloudy, 40 °F (4 °C)
- Game attendance: 70,132
- Referee: Shawn Hochuli
- TV announcers (WCNC/NFLN): Rich Eisen, Kurt Warner, Jamie Erdahl and Sara Walsh
- Recap, Game Book

Game information

**First quarter**

- CAR – Ja'Tavion Sanders 5-yard pass from Bryce Young (Eddy Piñeiro kick), 7:48. Panthers 7–0. **Drive: 8 plays, 90 yards, 4:00.**

**Second quarter**

- CAR – Eddy Piñeiro 53-yard field goal, 14:55. Panthers 10–0. **Drive: 10 plays, 56 yards, 5:44.**

**Third quarter**

- NYG – Tyrone Tracy Jr. 32-yard run (Graham Gano kick), 8:54. Panthers 10–7. **Drive: 10 plays, 65 yards, 6:06.**
- CAR – Chuba Hubbard 1-yard run (Eddy Piñeiro kick), 3:33. Panthers 17–7. **Drive: 10 plays, 80 yards, 5:21.**

**Fourth quarter**

- NYG – Daniel Jones 2-yard run (Graham Gano kick), 8:33. Panthers 17–14. **Drive: 13 plays, 96 yards, 6:58.**
- NYG – Graham Gano 42-yard field goal, 0:05. Tied 17–17. **Drive: 12 plays, 55 yards, 2:18.**

**Overtime**

- CAR – Eddy Piñeiro 36-yard field goal, 7:56. Panthers 20–17. **Drive: 4 plays, 5 yards, 1:56.**

**Top passers**

- NYG – Daniel Jones – 22/37, 190 yards, 2 INT
- CAR – Bryce Young – 15/25, 126 yards, TD

**Top rushers**

- NYG – Tyrone Tracy Jr. – 18 rushes, 103 yards, TD
- CAR – Chuba Hubbard – 28 rushes, 153 yards, TD

**Top receivers**

- NYG – Wan'Dale Robinson – 5 receptions, 51 yards
- CAR – Jalen Coker – 3 receptions, 41 yards

The Panthers took on the New York Giants in Munich, Germany, as part of the NFL International Series. Carolina starts off strong going into halftime with a 10–0 lead. Carolina and New York both score seven in the third. The Giants tie it up in the fourth by scoring a field goal, making the game go into overtime. Eddy Piñeiro kicks the game-winning field goal. Carolina wins 20–17 and improves to 3–7. This was quarterback Bryce Young's first back-to-back win in his NFL career.

==== Week 12: vs. Kansas City Chiefs ====
Week 12: Kansas City Chiefs at Carolina Panthers – Game summary

Quarter	1	2	3	4	Total
**Chiefs**	10	10	7	3	**30**
Panthers	3	6	7	11	**27**

at Bank of America Stadium, Charlotte, North Carolina

- Date: November 24
- Game time: 1:00 p.m. EST
- Game weather: Sunny, 61 °F (16 °C)
- Game attendance: 73,216
- Referee: Shawn Smith
- TV announcers (CBS): Ian Eagle, Charles Davis and Evan Washburn
- Recap, Game Book

Game information

**First quarter**

- KC – Noah Gray 35-yard pass from Patrick Mahomes (Spencer Shrader kick), 13:35. Chiefs 7–0. **Drive: 3 plays, 41 yards, 1:25.**
- CAR – Eddy Piñeiro 30-yard field goal, 9:24. Chiefs 7–3. **Drive: 8 plays, 58 yards, 4:11.**
- KC – Spencer Shrader 25-yard field goal, 2:39. Chiefs 10–3. **Drive: 11 plays, 68 yards, 6:45.**

**Second quarter**

- CAR – Eddy Piñeiro 32-yard field goal, 14:42. Chiefs 10–6. **Drive: 8 plays, 57 yards, 2:57.**
- KC – Spencer Shrader 41-yard field goal, 7:24. Chiefs 13–6. **Drive: 14 plays, 47 yards, 7:18.**
- KC – Noah Gray 11-yard pass from Patrick Mahomes (Spencer Shrader kick), 0:47. Chiefs 20–6. **Drive: 14 plays, 92 yards, 4:30.**
- CAR – Eddy Piñeiro 29-yard field goal, 0:00. Chiefs 20–9. **Drive: 8 plays, 59 yards, 0:44.**

**Third quarter**

- CAR – David Moore 1-yard pass from Bryce Young (Eddy Piñeiro kick), 6:26. Chiefs 20–16. **Drive: 15 plays, 70 yards, 8:34.**
- KC – DeAndre Hopkins 3-yard pass from Patrick Mahomes (Spencer Shrader kick), 2:42. Chiefs 27–16. **Drive: 10 plays, 75 yards, 3:44.**

**Fourth quarter**

- CAR – Eddy Piñeiro 33-yard field goal, 12:37. Chiefs 27–19. **Drive: 11 plays, 55 yards, 5:05.**
- CAR – Chuba Hubbard 1-yard run (Chuba Hubbard run), 1:46. Tied 27–27. **Drive: 5 plays, 49 yards, 1:35.**
- KC – Spencer Shrader 33-yard field goal, 0:00. Chiefs 30–27. **Drive: 7 plays, 57 yards, 1:46.**

**Top passers**

- KC – Patrick Mahomes – 27/37, 269 yards, 3 TD
- CAR – Bryce Young – 21/35, 262 yards, TD

**Top rushers**

- KC – Kareem Hunt – 16 rushes, 68 yards
- CAR – Chuba Hubbard – 16 rushes, 59 yards, TD

**Top receivers**

- KC – Noah Gray – 4 receptions, 66 yards, TD
- CAR – David Moore – 6 receptions, 80 yards, TD

Kansas City is first on the board with a touchdown by Noah Gray. Carolina follows with an Eddy Piñeiro field goal. The Chiefs score a field goal at the end of the first. In the second, Carolina scores 6 while Kansas City scores 10. The Chiefs go into halftime with an 11-point lead. Both teams score 7 in the third. Carolina is able to tie it up in the fourth, but at the very end, Kansas City wins with a field goal. The Chiefs beat the Panthers 30–27, and Carolina falls to 3–8.

==== Week 13: vs. Tampa Bay Buccaneers ====
Week 13: Tampa Bay Buccaneers at Carolina Panthers – Game summary

Quarter	1	2	3	4	OT	Total
**Buccaneers**	7	3	0	13	3	**26**
Panthers	3	10	3	7	0	**23**

at Bank of America Stadium, Charlotte, North Carolina

- Date: December 1
- Game time: 4:05 p.m. EST
- Game weather: Mostly sunny, 51 °F (11 °C)
- Game attendance: 69,214
- Referee: Tra Blake
- TV announcers (Fox): Chris Myers, Mark Schlereth and Jen Hale
- Recap, Game Book

Game information

**First quarter**

- TB – Mike Evans 2-yard pass from Baker Mayfield (Chase McLaughlin kick), 4:29. Buccaneers 7–0. **Drive: 12 plays, 63 yards, 6:06.**
- CAR – Eddy Piñeiro 47-yard field goal, 0:48. Buccaneers 7–3. **Drive: 7 plays, 41 yards, 3:41.**

**Second quarter**

- CAR – Bryce Young 10-yard run (Eddy Piñeiro kick), 7:45. Panthers 10–7. **Drive: 4 plays, 36 yards, 1:57.**
- TB – Chase McLaughlin 27-yard field goal, 3:39. Tied 10–10. **Drive: 9 plays, 61 yards, 4:06.**
- CAR – Eddy Piñeiro 27-yard field goal, 0:05. Panthers 13–10. **Drive: 9 plays, 49 yards, 0:38.**

**Third quarter**

- CAR – Eddy Piñeiro 22-yard field goal, 0:19. Panthers 16–10. **Drive: 7 plays, 16 yards, 3:49.**

**Fourth quarter**

- TB – Bucky Irving 6-yard run (Chase McLaughlin kick), 8:53. Buccaneers 17–16. **Drive: 11 plays, 69 yards, 6:26.**
- TB – Chase McLaughlin 26-yard field goal, 3:05. Buccaneers 20–16. **Drive: 9 plays, 67 yards, 4:13.**
- CAR – Adam Thielen 25-yard pass from Bryce Young (Eddy Piñeiro kick), 0:30. Panthers 23–20. **Drive: 9 plays, 60 yards, 2:35.**
- TB – Chase McLaughlin 51-yard field goal, 0:00. Tied 23–23. **Drive: 6 plays, 36 yards, 0:30.**

**Overtime**

- TB – Chase McLaughlin 30-yard field goal, 2:50. Buccaneers 26–23. **Drive: 5 plays, 59 yards, 2:13.**

**Top passers**

- TB – Baker Mayfield – 21/33, 235 yards, TD, 2 INT
- CAR – Bryce Young – 26/46, 298 yards, TD

**Top rushers**

- TB – Bucky Irving – 25 rushes, 152 yards, TD
- CAR – Chuba Hubbard – 12 rushes, 43 yards

**Top receivers**

- TB – Mike Evans – 8 receptions, 118 yards, TD
- CAR – Adam Thielen – 8 receptions, 99 yards, TD

Carolina and Tampa Bay go into overtime, but the Buccaneers take the win, 26–23. The Panthers fall to 3–9.

==== Week 14: at Philadelphia Eagles ====
Week 14: Carolina Panthers at Philadelphia Eagles – Game summary

Quarter	1	2	3	4	Total
Panthers	3	7	6	0	**16**
**Eagles**	0	14	0	8	**22**

at Lincoln Financial Field, Philadelphia, Pennsylvania

- Date: December 8
- Game time: 1:00 p.m. EST
- Game weather: Clear, 55 °F (13 °C)
- Game attendance: 69,879
- Referee: Carl Cheffers
- TV announcers (Fox): Adam Amin, Mark Sanchez and Kristina Pink
- Recap, Game Book

Game information

**First quarter**

- CAR – Eddy Piñeiro 38-yard field goal, 1:09. Panthers 3–0. **Drive: 5 plays, 27 yards, 1:52.**

**Second quarter**

- PHI – Jalen Hurts 1-yard run (Jake Elliott kick), 11:48. Eagles 7–3. **Drive: 10 plays, 70 yards, 4:21.**
- CAR – Tommy Tremble 3-yard pass from Bryce Young (Eddy Piñeiro kick), 4:00. Panthers 10–7. **Drive: 14 plays, 69 yards, 7:48.**
- PHI – DeVonta Smith 4-yard pass from Jalen Hurts (Jake Elliott kick), 0:14. Eagles 14–10. **Drive: 7 plays, 44 yards, 1:36.**

**Third quarter**

- CAR – Chuba Hubbard 1-yard run (Eddy Piñeiro kick), 2:49. Panthers 16–14. **Drive: 12 plays, 58 yards, 7:53.**

**Fourth quarter**

- PHI – Grant Calcaterra 4-yard pass from Jalen Hurts (Saquon Barkley run), 13:45. Eagles 22–16. **Drive: 8 plays, 70 yards, 4:04.**

**Top passers**

- CAR – Bryce Young – 19/34, 191 yards, TD, INT
- PHI – Jalen Hurts – 14/21, 108 yards, 2 TD

**Top rushers**

- CAR – Chuba Hubbard – 26 rushes, 92 yards, TD
- PHI – Saquon Barkley – 20 rushes, 124 yards

**Top receivers**

- CAR – Adam Thielen – 9 receptions, 102 yards
- PHI – A. J. Brown – 4 receptions, 43 yards

==== Week 15: vs. Dallas Cowboys ====
Week 15: Dallas Cowboys at Carolina Panthers – Game summary

Quarter	1	2	3	4	Total
**Cowboys**	0	10	14	6	**30**
Panthers	0	7	0	7	**14**

at Bank of America Stadium, Charlotte, North Carolina

- Date: December 15
- Game time: 1:00 p.m. EST
- Game weather: Cloudy, 45 °F (7 °C)
- Game attendance: 70,570
- Referee: Bill Vinovich
- TV announcers (Fox): Joe Davis, Greg Olsen and Pam Oliver
- Recap, Game Book

Game information

**First quarter**

- No scoring plays.

**Second quarter**

- DAL – CeeDee Lamb 14-yard pass from Cooper Rush (Brandon Aubrey kick), 9:01. Cowboys 7–0. **Drive: 10 plays, 77 yards, 5:45.**
- DAL – Brandon Aubrey 52-yard field goal, 4:05. Cowboys 10–0. **Drive: 6 plays, 14 yards, 2:14.**
- CAR – Jalen Coker 83-yard pass from Bryce Young (Eddy Piñeiro kick), 0:31. Cowboys 10–7. **Drive: 1 play, 83 yards, 0:11.**

**Third quarter**

- DAL – Jalen Tolbert 11-yard pass from Cooper Rush (Brandon Aubrey kick), 12:46. Cowboys 17–7. **Drive: 5 plays, 29 yards, 2:04.**
- DAL – Jalen Brooks 17-yard pass from Cooper Rush (Brandon Aubrey kick), 6:55. Cowboys 24–7. **Drive: 6 plays, 78 yards, 3:28.**

**Fourth quarter**

- DAL – Brandon Aubrey 45-yard field goal, 14:12. Cowboys 27–7. **Drive: 10 plays, 46 yards, 5:21.**
- CAR – Bryce Young 6-yard run (Eddy Piñeiro kick), 9:13. Cowboys 27–14. **Drive: 12 plays, 70 yards, 4:59.**
- DAL – Brandon Aubrey 41-yard field goal, 6:09. Cowboys 30–14. **Drive: 6 plays, 23 yards, 3:04.**

**Top passers**

- DAL – Cooper Rush – 18/29, 214 yards, 3 TD
- CAR – Bryce Young – 19/28, 219 yards, TD, 2 INT

**Top rushers**

- DAL – Rico Dowdle – 25 rushes, 149 yards
- CAR – Chuba Hubbard – 10 rushes, 32 yards

**Top receivers**

- DAL – CeeDee Lamb – 9 receptions, 116 yards, TD
- CAR – Jalen Coker – 4 receptions, 110 yards, TD

With the blowout loss the Panthers failed to clinch the NFC South for the ninth year in a row and were eliminated from playoff contention for the 7th straight year.

==== Week 16: vs. Arizona Cardinals ====
Week 16: Arizona Cardinals at Carolina Panthers – Game summary

Quarter	1	2	3	4	OT	Total
Cardinals	0	17	3	10	0	**30**
**Panthers**	7	13	3	7	6	**36**

at Bank of America Stadium, Charlotte, North Carolina

- Date: December 22
- Game time: 1:00 p.m. EST
- Game weather: Sunny, 37 °F (3 °C)
- Game attendance: 68,804
- Referee: Adrian Hill
- TV announcers (Fox): Chris Myers, Mark Schlereth and Jen Hale
- Recap, Game Book

Game information

**First quarter**

- CAR – Chuba Hubbard 4-yard run (Eddy Piñeiro kick), 4:55. Panthers 7–0. **Drive: 15 plays, 70 yards, 7:58.**

**Second quarter**

- ARI – Chad Ryland 48-yard field goal, 14:37. Panthers 7–3. **Drive: 8 plays, 55 yards, 5:18.**
- CAR – Bryce Young 23-yard run (kick failed, wide left), 11:35. Panthers 13–3. **Drive: 6 plays, 70 yards, 3:02.**
- CAR – Adam Thielen 8-yard pass from Bryce Young (Eddy Piñeiro kick), 7:55. Panthers 20–3. **Drive: 4 plays, 30 yards, 1:24.**
- ARI – James Conner 6-yard run (Chad Ryland kick), 5:57. Panthers 20–10. **Drive: 4 plays, 70 yards, 1:58.**
- ARI – DeeJay Dallas 1-yard pass from Kyler Murray (Chad Ryland kick), 0:07. Panthers 20–17. **Drive: 9 plays, 68 yards, 4:13.**

**Third quarter**

- CAR – Eddy Piñeiro 29-yard field goal, 9:31. Panthers 23–17. **Drive: 11 plays, 55 yards, 5:29.**
- ARI – Chad Ryland 30-yard field goal, 5:00. Panthers 23–20. **Drive: 9 plays, 58 yards, 4:31.**

**Fourth quarter**

- CAR – David Moore 18-yard pass from Bryce Young (Eddy Piñeiro kick), 12:04. Panthers 30–20. **Drive: 6 plays, 58 yards, 2:59.**
- ARI – Kyler Murray 20-yard run (Chad Ryland kick), 6:56. Panthers 30–27. **Drive: 9 plays, 70 yards, 5:08.**
- ARI – Chad Ryland 58-yard field goal, 0:00. Tied 30–30. **Drive: 7 plays, 35 yards, 1:47.**

**Overtime**

- CAR – Chuba Hubbard 21-yard run, 3:18. Panthers 36–30. **Drive: 2 plays, 49 yards, 0:53.**

**Top passers**

- ARI – Kyler Murray – 20/32, 202 yards, TD, INT
- CAR – Bryce Young – 17/26, 158 yards, 2 TD

**Top rushers**

- ARI – James Conner – 15 rushes, 117 yards, TD
- CAR – Chuba Hubbard – 25 rushes, 152 yards, 2 TD

**Top receivers**

- ARI – James Conner – 4 receptions, 49 yards
- CAR – Adam Thielen – 5 receptions, 43 yards, TD

With the overtime win the Panthers improved to 4–11 and knocked Arizona out of playoff contention.

==== Week 17: at Tampa Bay Buccaneers ====
Week 17: Carolina Panthers at Tampa Bay Buccaneers – Game summary

Quarter	1	2	3	4	Total
Panthers	7	7	0	0	**14**
**Buccaneers**	10	17	14	7	**48**

at Raymond James Stadium, Tampa, Florida

- Date: December 29
- Game time: 1:00 p.m. EST
- Game weather: Cloudy, 76 °F (24 °C)
- Game attendance: 64,434
- Referee: Clay Martin
- TV announcers (CBS): Ian Eagle, Charles Davis and Evan Washburn
- Recap, Game Book

Game information

**First quarter**

- TB – Mike Evans 2-yard pass from Baker Mayfield (Chase McLaughlin kick), 11:35. Buccaneers 7–0. **Drive: 6 plays, 70 yards, 3:25.**
- CAR – Adam Thielen 17-yard pass from Bryce Young (Eddy Piñeiro kick), 8:15. Tied 7–7. **Drive: 6 plays, 70 yards, 3:20.**
- TB – Chase McLaughlin 23-yard field goal, 1:13. Buccaneers 10–7. **Drive: 12 plays, 75 yards, 7:02.**

**Second quarter**

- TB – Chase McLaughlin 34-yard field goal, 10:31. Buccaneers 13–7. **Drive: 10 plays, 45 yards, 4:20.**
- TB – Mike Evans 1-yard pass from Baker Mayfield (Chase McLaughlin kick), 8:19. Buccaneers 20–7. **Drive: 4 plays, 81 yards, 1:50.**
- TB – Jalen McMillan 10-yard pass from Baker Mayfield (Chase McLaughlin kick), 1:11. Buccaneers 27–7. **Drive: 11 plays, 64 yards, 5:38.**
- CAR – Adam Thielen 40-yard pass from Bryce Young (Eddy Piñeiro kick), 0:50. Buccaneers 27–14. **Drive: 4 plays, 70 yards, 0:21.**

**Third quarter**

- TB – Payne Durham 5-yard pass from Baker Mayfield (Chase McLaughlin kick), 5:48. Buccaneers 34–14. **Drive: 10 plays, 94 yards, 5:50.**
- TB – Punt block returned for a touchdown by Joe Tryon-Shoyinka (Chase McLaughlin kick), 5:23. Buccaneers 41–14.

**Fourth quarter**

- TB – Jalen McMillan 16-yard pass from Baker Mayfield (Chase McLaughlin kick), 13:30. Buccaneers 48–14. **Drive: 9 plays, 85 yards, 5:03.**

**Top passers**

- CAR – Bryce Young – 15/28, 203 yards, 2 TD
- TB – Baker Mayfield – 27/32, 359 yards, 5 TD

**Top rushers**

- CAR – Raheem Blackshear – 8 rushes, 20 yards
- TB – Bucky Irving – 20 rushes, 113 yards

**Top receivers**

- CAR – Adam Thielen – 5 receptions, 110 yards, 2 TD
- TB – Mike Evans – 8 receptions, 97 yards, 2 TD

==== Week 18: at Atlanta Falcons ====
Week 18: Carolina Panthers at Atlanta Falcons – Game summary

Quarter	1	2	3	4	OT	Total
**Panthers**	3	14	14	7	6	**44**
Falcons	3	21	0	14	0	**38**

at Mercedes-Benz Stadium, Atlanta, Georgia

- Date: January 5
- Game time: 1:00 p.m. EST
- Game weather: None (retractable roof closed)
- Game attendance: 69,581
- Referee: Land Clark
- TV announcers (CBS): Ian Eagle, Charles Davis and Evan Washburn
- Recap, Game Book

Game information

**First quarter**

- ATL – Riley Patterson 31-yard field goal, 11:08. Falcons 3–0. **Drive: 12 plays, 58 yards, 3:52.**
- CAR – Eddy Piñeiro 35-yard field goal, 7:03. Tied 3–3. **Drive: 8 plays, 53 yards, 4:05.**

**Second quarter**

- CAR – Bryce Young 2-yard run (Eddy Piñeiro kick), 10:47. Panthers 10–3. **Drive: 11 plays, 58 yards, 5:16.**
- ATL – Michael Penix Jr. 5-yard run (Riley Patterson kick), 5:27. Tied 10–10. **Drive: 10 plays, 70 yards, 5:20.**
- CAR – Miles Sanders 33-yard pass from Bryce Young (Eddy Piñeiro kick), 2:48. Panthers 17–10. **Drive: 5 plays, 75 yards, 2:39.**
- ATL – Bijan Robinson 3-yard run (Riley Patterson kick), 1:34. Tied 17–17. **Drive: 6 plays, 70 yards, 1:14.**
- ATL – Drake London 20-yard pass from Michael Penix Jr. (Riley Patterson kick), 0:03. Falcons 24–17. **Drive: 6 plays, 81 yards, 0:37.**

**Third quarter**

- CAR – Tommy Tremble 12-yard pass from Bryce Young (Eddy Piñeiro kick), 10:43. Tied 24–24. **Drive: 4 plays, 21 yards, 1:21.**
- CAR – David Moore 9-yard pass from Bryce Young (Eddy Piñeiro kick), 1:02. Panthers 31–24. **Drive: 9 plays, 58 yards, 5:11.**

**Fourth quarter**

- ATL – Drake London 21-yard pass from Michael Penix Jr. (Riley Patterson kick), 9:50. Tied 31–31. **Drive: 11 plays, 74 yards, 6:12.**
- CAR – Bryce Young 10-yard run (Eddy Piñeiro kick), 4:01. Panthers 38–31. **Drive: 9 plays, 70 yards, 5:49.**
- ATL – Bijan Robinson 4-yard run (Riley Patterson kick), 0:46. Tied 38–38. **Drive: 11 plays, 70 yards, 3:15.**

**Overtime**

- CAR – Miles Sanders 1-yard run, 3:14. Panthers 44–38. **Drive: 10 plays, 70 yards, 6:46.**

**Top passers**

- CAR – Bryce Young – 25/34, 251 yards, 3 TD
- ATL – Michael Penix Jr. – 21/38, 312 yards, 2 TD, INT

**Top rushers**

- CAR – Miles Sanders – 17 rushes, 66 yards, TD
- ATL – Bijan Robinson – 28 rushes, 170 yards, 2 TD

**Top receivers**

- CAR – Jalen Coker – 7 receptions, 62 yards
- ATL – Drake London – 10 receptions, 187 yards, 2 TD

The Panthers were able to pull off a nail biting win over Atlanta to knock the Falcons out of the playoffs. Despite the win (which allowed Carolina to finish 5–12), the 38 points the Falcons scored meant the Panthers had officially surpassed the 1981 Colts for the most points surrendered in NFL history. Regardless, QB Bryce Young had gotten his first road win as an NFL starter.

=== Standings ===
==== Division ====
NFC South
	W	L	T	PCT	DIV	CONF	PF	PA	STK
^{(3)} Tampa Bay Buccaneers	10	7	0	.588	4–2	8–4	502	385	W2
Atlanta Falcons	8	9	0	.471	4–2	7–5	389	423	L2
Carolina Panthers	5	12	0	.294	2–4	4–8	341	534	W1
New Orleans Saints	5	12	0	.294	2–4	4–8	338	398	L4

==== Conference ====
NFC
Seed	Team	Division	W	L	T	PCT	DIV	CONF	SOS	SOV	STK
**Division leaders**
1	Detroit Lions	North	15	2	0	.882	6–0	11–1	.516	.494	W3
2	Philadelphia Eagles	East	14	3	0	.824	5–1	9–3	.453	.424	W2
3 (Note: Tampa Bay clinched the #3 seed over Los Angeles based on conference record. (Tampa Bay 8–4 to Los Angeles 6–6))	Tampa Bay Buccaneers	South	10	7	0	.588	4–2	8–4	.502	.465	W2
4 (Note: Los Angeles clinched the NFC West and #4 seed over Seattle based on strength of victory. (Los Angeles .441 to Seattle .424))	Los Angeles Rams	West	10	7	0	.588	4–2	6–6	.505	.441	L1
**Wild cards**
5	Minnesota Vikings	North	14	3	0	.824	4–2	9–3	.474	.408	L1
6	Washington Commanders	East	12	5	0	.706	4–2	9–3	.436	.358	W5
7	Green Bay Packers	North	11	6	0	.647	1–5	6–6	.533	.412	L2
**Did not qualify for the postseason**
8	Seattle Seahawks	West	10	7	0	.588	4–2	6–6	.498	.424	W2
9 (Note: Atlanta finished ahead of Arizona based on conference record. (Atlanta 7–5 to Arizona 4–8))	Atlanta Falcons	South	8	9	0	.471	4–2	7–5	.519	.426	L2
10	Arizona Cardinals	West	8	9	0	.471	3–3	4–8	.536	.404	W1
11	Dallas Cowboys	East	7	10	0	.412	3–3	5–7	.522	.387	L2
12	San Francisco 49ers	West	6	11	0	.353	1–5	4–8	.564	.402	L4
13 (Note: Chicago finished ahead of Carolina based on head-to-head victory.)	Chicago Bears	North	5	12	0	.294	1–5	3–9	.554	.388	W1
14 (Note: Carolina finished ahead of New Orleans based on strength of victory. (Carolina .329 to New Orleans .306))	Carolina Panthers	South	5	12	0	.294	2–4	4–8	.498	.329	W1
15	New Orleans Saints	South	5	12	0	.294	2–4	4–8	.505	.306	L4
16	New York Giants	East	3	14	0	.176	0–6	1–11	.554	.412	L1
**Tiebreakers** (Note: When breaking ties for three or more teams under the NFL's rules, they are first broken within divisions, then comparing only the highest ranked remaining team from each division.)
