= CFL global draft =

CFL global draft may refer to any of the following Canadian Football League (CFL) drafts:

- 2021 CFL global draft
- 2022 CFL global draft
- 2023 CFL global draft
- 2024 CFL global draft

== See also ==
- 2019 CFL–LFA draft
- 2019 CFL European draft
