= Luke Felix-Fualalo =

Australian player of American football (born 2002)

Profile
- Position: Offensive tackle

Personal information
- Born: 2 February 2002 (age 24); Brisbane, Queensland, Australia
- Listed height: 6 ft 7 in (2.01 m)
- Listed weight: 318 lb (144 kg)

Career information
- High school: Cathedral (Los Angeles, California); Mater Dei (Santa Ana, California)
- College: Utah (2019–2021); Hawaii (2022–2024)
- NFL draft: 2025: undrafted

Career history
- Seattle Seahawks (2025)*; Philadelphia Eagles (2025)*
- * Offseason or practice squad member only
- Stats at Pro Football Reference

Luke Sione Felix-Fualalo (born 2 February 2002) is an Australian professional American football offensive tackle. He played college football for the Utah Utes and Hawaii Rainbow Warriors and was signed by the Seattle Seahawks as an undrafted free agent in 2025.

== Early life ==
Felix-Fualalo was born on 2 February 2002, in Brisbane, Australia. He was named after the Star Wars character Luke Skywalker. His mother Denise Felix is a nurse of Polynesian descent who grew up in New Zealand, where she met his father Daniel Fualalo, a rugby player for the Tongan national team. Denise played netball at the national level. Felix-Fualalo has three brothers, Nathaniel, Ezra, and Ethan; his cousin, Colm Woulfe-Felix, is a strongman.

At age five, Felix-Fualalo began playing rugby, despite being below the age limit; an ESPN article stated that, "He was just too big to tell no. He played soccer too. He was so much larger than his teammates that he played goalie, if for no other reason than he filled up the frame of the goal." When he was of high school age, he decided to change sports. After initially trying out basketball, a coach suggested he start playing American football, which Felix-Fualalo had only seen in movies, mainly in The Blind Side.

In 2017, Felix-Fualalo moved to Los Angeles, California, U.S., where he attended Cathedral High School for a year. There, he played in football games for the first time as an offensive lineman. After a season there, he transferred to Mater Dei High School in 2018. Coming out of high school, Felix-Fualalo was ranked a three-star recruit, and he signed to play college football for the Utah Utes.

== College career ==
As a true freshman at Utah in 2019, Felix-Fualalo redshirted while appearing in one game. He then was used as a reserve and on special teams during the 2020 and 2021 seasons. In total, he played in 11 games at Utah. Felix-Fualalo entered the NCAA transfer portal after the season and transferred to the Hawaii Rainbow Warriors in 2022. He played in 13 games as a backup and special teams player for a 3–10 Hawaii team in 2022. Felix-Fualalo earned a starting role in the 2023 season, earning first-team All-Mountain West Conference (MW) honors from Pro Football Focus (PFF) after starting 11 of 13 games while allowing only one sack. In his last year, 2024, he appeared in eight games and started four at right tackle.

In college, Felix-Fualalo played while standing at 6 feet 7 inches (201 cm) and 310 pounds (140 kg). At Hawaii, Felix-Fualalo studied Japanese samurais, particularly Miyamoto Musashi, as part of his postgraduate education. An ESPN article called him "the most interesting man in college football".

== Professional career ==
Pre-draft measurables
Height	Weight	Arm length	Hand span	Wingspan	40-yard dash	10-yard split	20-yard split	20-yard shuttle	Three-cone drill	Vertical jump	Bench press
6 ft 7 1/8 in (2.01 m)	318 lb (144 kg)	32 3/4 in (0.83 m)	10 1/2 in (0.27 m)	6 ft 10 in (2.08 m)	5.49 s	1.91 s	3.13 s	4.95 s	8.47 s	25.0 in (0.64 m)	25 reps
All values from Pro Day

=== Seattle Seahawks ===
After going unselected in the 2025 NFL draft, Felix-Fualalo signed with the Seattle Seahawks as an undrafted free agent on 16 June 2025. He was waived on 26 August, as part of the final roster cuts.

=== Philadelphia Eagles ===
On 28 August 2025, Felix-Fualalo was signed to the practice squad of the Philadelphia Eagles, receiving the team's exempt practice squad spot as part of the International Player Pathway (IPP) program.
