= Habakkuk Baldonado =

Italian-American gridiron football player (born 1999)

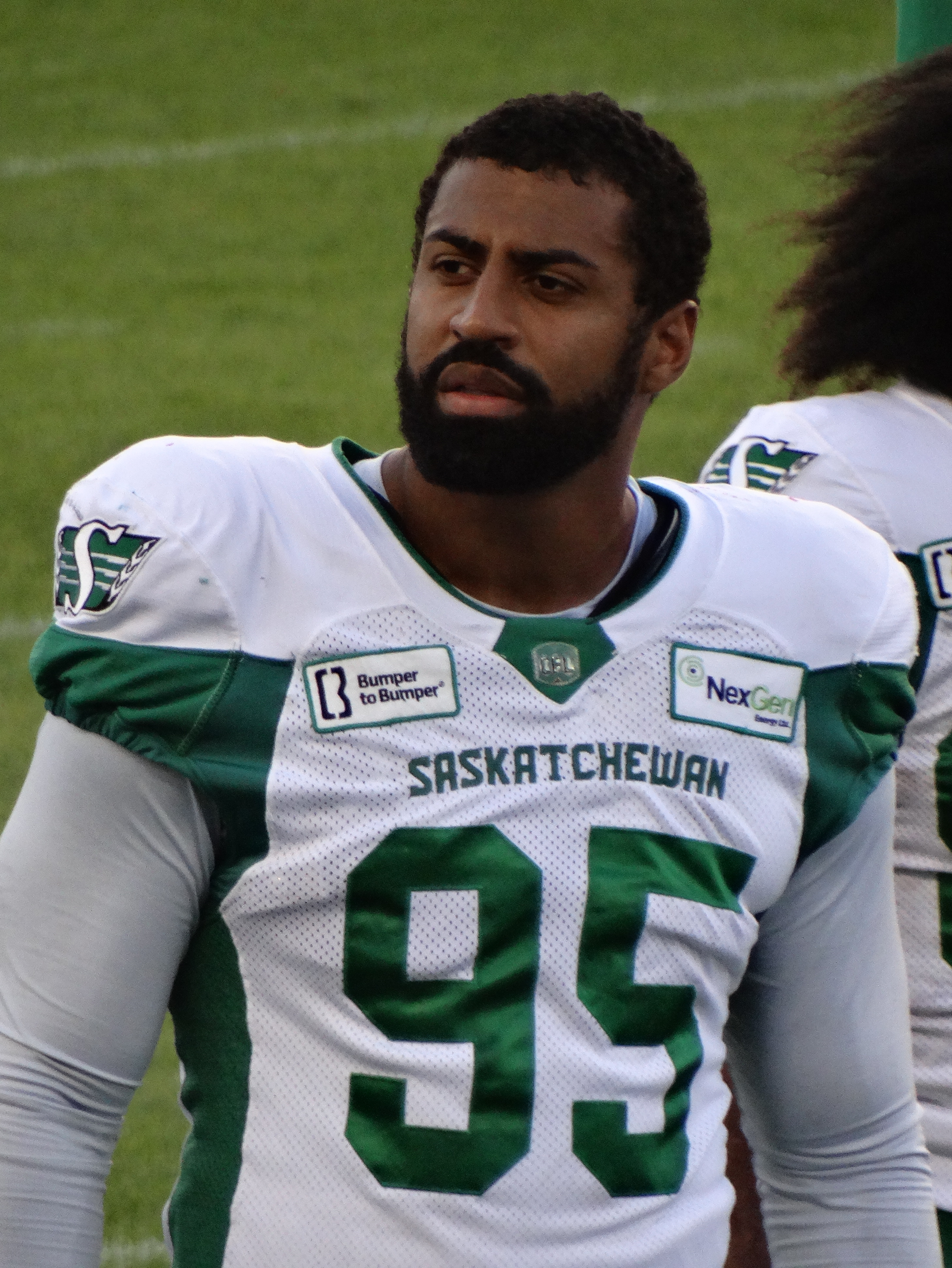
- Baldonado with Saskatchewan Roughriders in 2024

Saskatchewan Roughriders
- Position: Defensive lineman
- Roster status: Active
- CFL status: Global

Personal information
- Born: September 6, 1999 (age 27); Rome, Italy
- Listed height: 6 ft 4 in (1.93 m)
- Listed weight: 251 lb (114 kg)

Career information
- High school: Clearwater Academy International (Clearwater, Florida, U.S.)
- College: Pittsburgh (2018–2022)
- NFL draft: 2023: undrafted
- CFL draft: 2023G: 2nd round, 12th overall pick

Career history
- New York Giants (2023)*; Saskatchewan Roughriders (2023–2025); Ottawa Redblacks (2026); Saskatchewan Roughriders (2026–present)
- * Offseason or practice squad member only

Awards and highlights
- Grey Cup champion (2025); Second-team All-ACC (2021)
- Stats at Pro Football Reference
- Stats at CFL.ca

Habakkuk Thomas Baldonado (born September 6, 1999) is an Italian professional Canadian football defensive lineman for the Saskatchewan Roughriders of the Canadian Football League (CFL). He played college football at Pittsburgh.

== Early life ==
Baldonado was born in Italy, where he played three years of American football. He moved to Florida in the United States in 2017 for better football opportunuties. Baldonado attended Clearwater Academy International in Clearwater, Florida for one year. During that one season, he had 83 tackles and 30.5 sacks. Baldonado committed to the University of Pittsburgh to play college football.

== College career ==
Baldonado played in one game his freshman year at Pittsburgh in 2018 and took a redshirt. In 2019, he had 30 tackles and four sacks. In 2020, he played in only four games due to injury and recorded three tackles. As a 14-game starter in 2021, Baldonado had 41 tackles and nine sacks. He started nine games as a senior in 2022, missing three due to injury while posting 25 tackles and two sacks.

== Professional career ==
Pre-draft measurables
Height	Weight	Arm length	Hand span	Wingspan	40-yard dash	10-yard split	20-yard split	20-yard shuttle	Three-cone drill	Vertical jump	Broad jump	Bench press
6 ft 4 1/4 in (1.94 m)	251 lb (114 kg)	33 in (0.84 m)	10 1/2 in (0.27 m)	6 ft 7 3/8 in (2.02 m)	4.78 s	1.67 s	2.79 s	4.39 s	7.00 s	35.0 in (0.89 m)	10 ft 0 in (3.05 m)	21 reps
All values from NFL Combine/Pro Day

=== New York Giants ===
Baldonado went undrafted in the 2023 NFL draft but signed a free agent contract with the New York Giants on April 29, 2023. On May 2, Baldonado was drafted in the second round (12th overall) in the 2023 CFL global draft by the Saskatchewan Roughriders. Baldonado was waived by the Giants on August 29.

=== Saskatchewan Roughriders (first stint) ===
Baldonado was signed to the practice squad of the Roughriders on September 18, 2023, and was promoted to the active roster on September 28. On June 1, 2024, he was moved back to the practice roster for the start of the 2024 CFL season. Baldonado was promoted to the active roster for the second time on July 3. He became a free agent upon the expiry of his contract on February 10, 2026.

=== Ottawa Redblacks ===
On February 10, 2026, it was announced that Baldonado had signed with the Ottawa Redblacks. He played in eight regular season games where he recorded eight defensive tackles, two tackles for loss, and two sacks. Baldonado was released on September 7.

=== Saskatchewan Roughriders (second stint) ===
On September 10, 2026, it was announced that Baldonado had signed again with the Roughriders.
