= Kilian Zierer =

German-American football player (born 2000)

No. 78 – Jacksonville Jaguars
- Position: Offensive tackle
- Roster status: Practice squad

Personal information
- Born: February 24, 2000 (age 26); Munich, Bavaria, Germany
- Listed height: 6 ft 7 in (2.01 m)
- Listed weight: 312 lb (142 kg)

Career information
- College: College of the Canyons (2018–2019); Auburn (2020–2022)
- NFL draft: 2023: undrafted
- CFL draft: 2023G: 2nd round, 11th overall pick

Career history
- Houston Texans (2023–2024)*; Atlanta Falcons (2025)*; Cleveland Browns (2025)*; San Francisco 49ers (2025)*; Jacksonville Jaguars (2025–present)*
- * Offseason or practice squad member only
- Stats at Pro Football Reference

Kilian Zierer (born February 24, 2000) is a German professional American football offensive tackle for the Jacksonville Jaguars of the National Football League (NFL). He played college football for the College of the Canyons Cougars and Auburn Tigers.

== Early life ==
Zierer was born on February 24, 2000, in Munich, Bavaria, Germany. He played soccer growing up before first watching American football on a visit to the U.S. at age 15. He decided to try out the sport at age 16, joining the Munich Cowboys and playing two seasons for their under-19 squad as a tight end and wide receiver. He then moved to the offensive line and played a season with the Allgäu Comets.

== College career ==
With the help of Gridiron Imports, a non-profit foundation that helps football players from around the world attain opportunities to play football and pursue their education at the high school and college level in the United States, Kilian Zierer made the decision to play football in the U.S.

Zierer choose to play college football in the U.S. for the College of the Canyons Cougars in 2018. In his first year, he was named all-conference at left tackle and helped the Cougars compile a record of 10–0 while being the champions of the SCFA National Division, Northern League. He became highly recruited afterwards and was ranked the best junior college recruit at his position by Rivals.com. He repeated as an all-conference left tackle and helped the Cougars win a second straight SCFA National Division, Northern League title.

Zierer committed to the Auburn Tigers. He had suffered a torn ACL towards the end of his second junior college season which resulted in him sitting out the 2020 season with Auburn. He began the 2021 season as a backup but eventually saw action as a starter. He ended the season with nine games played. He then started all 12 games as a senior in 2022. He was invited to the 2023 East–West Shrine Bowl.

== Professional career ==
Pre-draft measurables
| Height | Weight | Arm length | Hand span | Wingspan | 40-yard dash | 10-yard split | 20-yard split | 20-yard shuttle | Three-cone drill | Vertical jump | Broad jump |
|---|---|---|---|---|---|---|---|---|---|---|---|
| 6 ft 7 1/4 in (2.01 m) | 307 lb (139 kg) | 34 1/4 in (0.87 m) | 10 1/4 in (0.26 m) | 6 ft 11 1/8 in (2.11 m) | 5.21 s | 1.82 s | 2.91 s | 4.67 s | 7.78 s | 27.0 in (0.69 m) | 8 ft 7 in (2.62 m) |
All values from Pro Day

=== Houston Texans ===
After going unselected in the 2023 NFL draft, Zierer signed with the Houston Texans as an undrafted free agent. He was also selected in the second round (11th overall) of the 2023 CFL global draft by the Edmonton Elks. Although he performed well in training camp for the Texans, he suffered a sprained ankle in preseason and was placed on season-ending injured reserve on August 24, 2023.

On April 18, 2024, Zierer was designated as the Texans' exempt/international player (Note: All teams are allowed to designate one player as exempt/international, which means that they do not count towards the 90-man roster limit.) for the 2024 season as part of the International Player Pathway Program (IPPP). He was waived on August 27, and re-signed to the practice squad.

=== Atlanta Falcons ===
On February 12, 2025, Zierer signed with the Atlanta Falcons. He was waived by the Falcons on August 2.

=== Cleveland Browns ===
On August 3, 2025, Zierer was claimed off waivers by the Cleveland Browns. He was waived on August 26 as part of final roster cuts.

=== San Francisco 49ers ===
On August 28, 2025, Zierer signed with the San Francisco 49ers' practice squad. He was released on October 13.

=== Jacksonville Jaguars ===
On October 15, 2025, Zierer signed with the Jacksonville Jaguars' practice squad. He signed a reserve/future contract with Jacksonville on January 12, 2026.

On August 30, 2026, Zierer was waived by the Jaguars as a part of final roster cuts; he was re-signed to the team's practice squad the next day.
