= Christian Scotland-Williamson =

English American football tight end and rugby union footballer (born 1993)

- Born: 5 July 1993 (age 33) Waltham Forest, England

Rugby union career
- Position: Lock
Senior career
| Years | Team | Apps | (Points) |
| 2014–2017 | Worcester Warriors | 23 | (0) |
| 2021–2022 | Harlequins | 2 | (0) |
- Correct as of 17 January 2024

Christian Scotland-Williamson (born 5 July 1993) is an English barrister, broadcaster, former professional rugby union player and former American football tight end. He most recently played for Harlequins, having previously played for Worcester Warriors before changing sport to American Football and then returning to rugby union.

== Rugby career ==
He played for the Worcester Warriors from 2014-2017, where he made 23 overall appearances. In 2017, he made a tackle and a video of this tackle went viral. The popularity of the video ultimately caused him to leave rugby to pursue a career in American football. He returned to rugby union ahead of the 2021–22 season having signed for Premiership champions Harlequins., and left the club at the end of the season. As of April 2023, he is a Disciplinary Panel Member for the RFU, and is a member of the National Anti-Doping Panel

== American football career ==
Christian Scotland-Williamson
Profile
- Position: Tight end

Personal information
- Born: 5 July 1993 (age 33); Waltham Forest, England
- Listed height: 6 ft 9 in (2.06 m)
- Listed weight: 274 lb (124 kg)

Career information
- High school: Royal Grammar School (High Wycombe, England)
- College: Loughborough (UK)
- NFL draft: 2018: undrafted

Career history
- Pittsburgh Steelers (2018–2020)*
- * Offseason or practice squad member only
- Stats at Pro Football Reference

Scotland-Williamson's move to American football was facilitated through the National Football League's International Player Pathway program. He signed a practice squad contract with the Pittsburgh Steelers on 1 May 2018. He was waived on 1 September 2018 and was signed to the practice squad the next day. He signed a reserve/future contract with the Steelers on 1 January 2019.

On 31 August 2019, Scotland-Williamson was waived by the Steelers and was signed to the practice squad the next day.

On 30 December 2019, Scotland Williamson was signed by the Steelers to a reserve/future contract. On 20 July 2020, he was waived by the Steelers with a Non-Football Injury designation.

== Personal life ==
Scotland-Williamson was formerly a student at Loughborough University where he earned an Undergraduate Degree in Geography and Economics. He also earned a Master's degree in International Business from the University of Birmingham. Prior to Loughborough, Scotland-Williamson was a boarding house student at the Royal Grammar School in High Wycombe. His favorite subject was Latin. He was called to the Bar of England and Wales in 2023.
