= Junior Aho =

French gridiron football player (born 1999)

Profile
- Position: Defensive tackle

Personal information
- Born: February 2, 1999 (age 27); Nice, France
- Listed height: 6 ft 3 in (1.91 m)
- Listed weight: 272 lb (123 kg)

Career information
- College: NMMI (2019); SMU (2020–2022)
- NFL draft: 2023: undrafted
- CFL draft: 2023G: 2nd round, 16th overall pick

Career history
- Minnesota Vikings (2023)*; Carolina Panthers (2024)*; Atlanta Falcons (2024)*
- * Offseason or practice squad member only
- Stats at Pro Football Reference

Junior Aho (born February 2, 1999) is a French professional American football defensive tackle. He played college football for the New Mexico Military Bulldogs and SMU Mustangs.

== College career ==
In his college career, he recorded 43 tackles with 7.5 going for a loss, five sacks, and two forced fumbles, in three years with the SMU Mustangs.

== Professional career ==
Pre-draft measurables
| Height | Weight | Arm length | Hand span | 40-yard dash | 10-yard split | 20-yard split | 20-yard shuttle | Three-cone drill | Vertical jump | Broad jump |
|---|---|---|---|---|---|---|---|---|---|---|
| 6 ft 2 1/4 in (1.89 m) | 260 lb (118 kg) | 33 7/8 in (0.86 m) | 9 in (0.23 m) | 4.59 s | 1.66 s | 2.65 s | 4.90 s | 7.38 s | 33.5 in (0.85 m) | 10 ft 3 in (3.12 m) |
All values from Pro Day

=== Minnesota Vikings ===
After not being selected in the 2023 NFL draft, Aho signed with the Minnesota Vikings as an undrafted free agent through the NFL's International Player Pathway Program. Additionally, he was drafted (16th overall) by the BC Lions of the Canadian Football League (CFL) in the 2023 CFL global draft. He was waived by the Vikings on August 29, 2023, and re-signed to the practice squad. He was not signed to a reserve/future contract and became a free agent at the end of the season.

=== Carolina Panthers ===
Aho signed with the Carolina Panthers on May 20, 2024. He was waived/injured on August 27, 2024.

=== Atlanta Falcons ===
On October 14, 2024, Aho signed with the Atlanta Falcons practice squad. He signed a reserve/future contract on January 6, 2025. He was waived on May 9, 2025.
