= Haggai Ndubuisi =

Nigerian gridiron football player (born 2000)

No. 64 – Green Bay Packers
- Position: Defensive tackle
- Roster status: Practice squad

Personal information
- Born: 15 October 2000 (age 26); Lagos, Nigeria
- Listed height: 6 ft 7 in (2.01 m)
- Listed weight: 296 lb (134 kg)

Career information
- NFL draft: 2022: undrafted

Career history
- Arizona Cardinals (2022)*; Denver Broncos (2023)*; San Antonio Brahmas (2024)*; Washington Commanders (2024)*; New England Patriots (2024); Washington Commanders (2024)*; Houston Texans (2025); Tampa Bay Buccaneers (2026)*; Green Bay Packers (2026–present)*
- * Offseason or practice squad member only

Career NFL statistics as of Week 10, 2026
- Total tackles: 1
- Stats at Pro Football Reference

Haggai Chisom Ndubuisi (born 15 October 2000) is a Nigerian professional American football defensive tackle for the Green Bay Packers of the National Football League (NFL). He joined the NFL through the International Player Pathway (IPP) program and has been a member of the NFL's Arizona Cardinals, Denver Broncos, Washington Commanders, New England Patriots, and the United Football League (UFL)'s San Antonio Brahmas.

== Early life ==
Ndubuisi was born on 15 October 2000, in Lagos, Nigeria. He grew up playing soccer and basketball before watching a YouTube video about the National Football League (NFL)'s best hits when he was 18. He enjoyed watching it and decided that he wanted to be a football player. Ndubuisi often brought his friends to local fields and tried to re-enact what he saw in the videos, despite knowing almost nothing about the game.

There were almost no football teams in Nigeria at the time; Ndubuisi said "American football is not a sport that is in Nigeria per se [sic] - it is like a sport without hope. There is no future in it." He sometimes practiced alone due to the sport's lack of popularity. He was noticed by Ejike Ugboaja, who co-leads (with Osi Umenyiora) UpRise Academy, a program that helps identify African football talent, and was invited in 2021.

After six months of training, Ndubuisi was invited to an NFL camp in London in late 2021. He also trained with former NFL offensive lineman LeCharles Bentley.

== Professional career ==
=== Arizona Cardinals ===
In 2022, Ndubuisi was chosen as one of the participants in the NFL's International Player Pathway Program (IPPP), being allocated to the Arizona Cardinals as an offensive tackle. He appeared in the team's first preseason game, appearing on two snaps, but was released afterwards on 14 August.

=== Denver Broncos ===
Ndubuisi returned to the IPPP in 2023 and was allocated to the Denver Broncos, with his position being switched to the defensive line. In his first preseason game with the team, he posted two tackles. He was waived on 29 August 2023, and re-signed to the practice squad. He was not signed to a reserve/future contract and thus became a free agent at the end of the season.

=== San Antonio Brahmas ===
On 1 February 2024, Ndubuisi signed with the San Antonio Brahmas of the United Football League (UFL). He was waived by the Brahmas on 12 February.

=== Washington Commanders (first stint) ===
On 3 April 2024, Ndubuisi signed with the Washington Commanders. He was waived on 27 August and joined their practice squad the following day.

=== New England Patriots ===
On 1 January 2025, the New England Patriots signed Ndubuisi to their active roster. He was waived the following day with a non-football illness designation.

=== Washington Commanders (second stint) ===
On 7 January 2025, Ndubuisi signed with the Washington Commanders' practice squad. He was placed on injured reserve the following day.

=== Houston Texans ===
On 31 July 2025, Ndubuisi signed with the Houston Texans. He was waived on 26 August as part of final roster cuts, and re-signed to the practice squad.

=== Tampa Bay Buccaneers ===
On 10 April 2026, Ndubuisi signed a one–year contract with the Tampa Bay Buccaneers. He was waived by the Buccaneers on July 29.

=== Green Bay Packers ===
On November 17, 2026, Ndubuisi signed with the Green Bay Packers practice squad.
