= Dante Barnett (defensive lineman) =

English gridiron football player (born 2003)

Profile
- Position: Linebacker

Personal information
- Born: 11 February 2003 (age 23); Birmingham, England
- Listed height: 6 ft 1 in (1.85 m)
- Listed weight: 275 lb (125 kg)

Career information
- College: Dickinson
- NFL draft: 2025: undrafted

Career history
- Cincinnati Bengals (2025)*; Green Bay Packers (2025)*
- * Offseason or practice squad member only
- Stats at Pro Football Reference

Dante Barnett (born 11 February 2003) is an English football linebacker. He entered the league through the International Player Pathway Program, originally signing with the Cincinnati Bengals in 2025.

== Early life ==
Barnett is from Birmingham, England, and played a number of sports growing up but took to American football and had successful try-outs at the NFL Academy located at Loughborough University in Leicestershire between 2019 and 2021. After three years at the NFL Academy, Barnett tried making the jump to American college football and received offers from schools in Texas such as Texas Christian University (TCU), Southern Methodist University (SMU), and the University of Houston, but did not have the grades, and instead went to an NCAA Division III school, Dickinson College in Pennsylvania, where he played for a year in 2022. He later became part of the NFL's International Player Pathway.

== Professional career ==
=== Pre-draft ===
Pre-draft measurables
Height	Weight	Arm length	Hand span	Wingspan	40-yard dash	10-yard split	20-yard split	20-yard shuttle	Three-cone drill	Vertical jump	Broad jump	Bench press
6 ft 1 in (1.85 m)	275 lb (125 kg)	32 5/8 in (0.83 m)	9 5/8 in (0.24 m)	6 ft 5 1/8 in (1.96 m)	4.70 s	1.75 s	2.77 s	4.57 s	7.33 s	28.0 in (0.71 m)	99 ft 0 in (30.18 m)	24 reps
All values from University of South Florida/IPP Pro Day

=== Cincinnati Bengals ===
On 27 April 2025, Barnett signed with the Cincinnati Bengals as an undrafted free agent. On 22 July, the Bengals released Barnett ahead of training camp.

=== Green Bay Packers ===
On 29 October 2025, the Green Bay Packers signed Barnett to their practice squad to fill their vacant International Player Pathways spot. He signed a reserve/future contract with Green Bay on 12 January 2026. On 28 July, Barnett was released by the team.

== Personal life ==
Barnett's father died when he was young; he previously worked at a Jaguar-Land Rover plant. He is of Jamaican descent.
