= Adam Korsak =

Australian gridiron football player (born 1997)

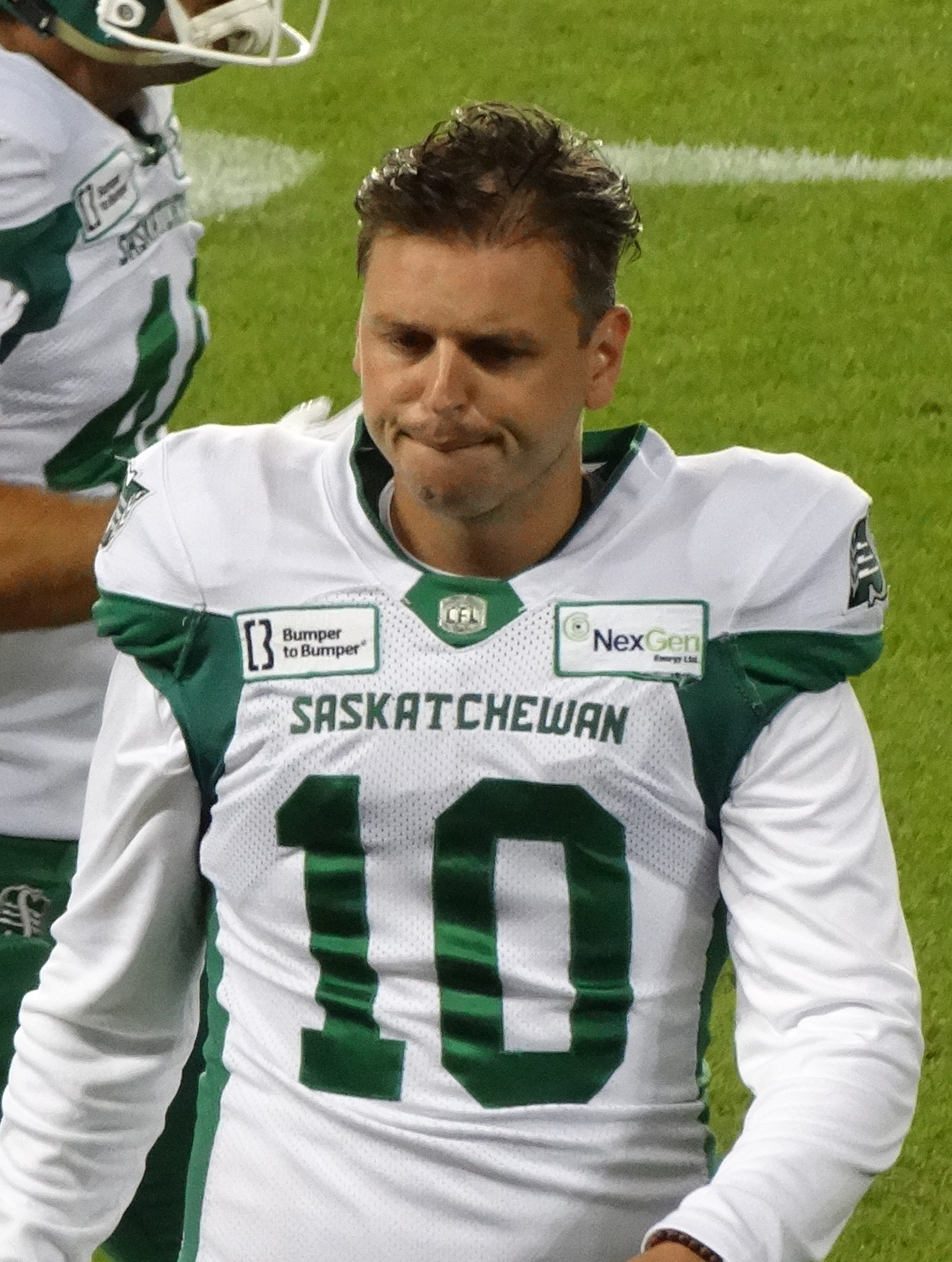
- Korsak with the Saskatchewan Roughriders in 2024

Profile
- Position: Punter

Personal information
- Born: 31 October 1997 (age 29); Melbourne, Australia
- Listed height: 6 ft 1 in (1.85 m)
- Listed weight: 185 lb (84 kg)

Career information
- High school: Maribyrnong College (Maribyrnong, Victoria, Australia)
- College: Rutgers (2018–2022)
- CFL draft: 2023G: 1st round, 3rd overall pick

Career history
- Saskatchewan Roughriders (2023–2024)

Awards and highlights
- CFL West All-Star (2023); Ray Guy Award (2022); First-team All-American (2022); Second-team All-American (2021); First-team All-Big Ten (2021); 3× Second-team All-Big Ten (2019, 2020, 2022); NCAA records: Career punts (349); Career punting yards (15,318); Single season net punting average (45.3)
- Stats at CFL.ca

Adam Korsak (born 31 October 1997) is an Australian former gridiron football punter who played in two seasons for the Saskatchewan Roughriders of the Canadian Football League (CFL). He played college football for the Rutgers Scarlet Knights. The all-time NCAA record-holder for career punts, punting yards and single-season net average, he was named the 2022 winner of the Ray Guy Award.

== Early life ==
Korsak was born on 31 October 1997 in Melbourne, Victoria. He grew up in the Melbourne suburb Maribyrnong and played cricket, Australian rules football and golf. He was a member of the Victorian under 15s cricket team and was teammates with Will Pucovski. Korsak attended Maribyrnong College and graduated as part of the class of 2015, after which he studied at the University of Melbourne for a year.

In 2016, Korsak attended the Prokick Australia camp held by Nathan Chapman, and his performance there led to an athletic scholarship offer to play American football at Rutgers University in the U.S., which he accepted. Korsak had played Madden NFL 06, watched several Cleveland Browns games and the film Any Given Sunday to learn the rules of the sport.

== College career ==
Korsak was given a two-star rating and placed as the seventh-best punter recruit in 247Sports' rankings. During his first year at Rutgers, he set the school record for longest punt with a kick of 79 yards. He started all 12 games that year, being named honorable mention all-conference while posting a team-record with a 40.1 net punt average. Korsak totaled 78 punts on the year for 3,333 yards, with a gross average (Note: A gross average is the average distance of how far a player's punt travels, whereas a net average is that number minus the yards they were returned.) of 42.7 yards-per-punt.

In 2019, Korsak thrice was named winner of the weekly Ray Guy Award for best punter nationally, additionally being a semifinalist for the Ray Guy Award given to the best punter overall on the year. He appeared in every game and posted a total of 76 punts for 3,327 yards, having a long of 69 with only two touchbacks and 31 kicks inside the 20, while ranking first in the Big Ten Conference with a net average of 41.5. After the season, Korsak was named second-team all-conference by both the league's coaches and Associated Press (AP).

Korsak appeared in all nine games during the 2020 season (which was shortened due to the COVID-19 pandemic), posting 48 punts for 2,062 yards (a gross average of 43.0), including a long of 66 with no touchbacks and 21 inside the 20-yard line. He had a net average of 42.3, placing ninth nationally in that category. He was named co-team captain with Isiah Pacheco starting in 2020, a rare achievement for a player at his position and a role he would serve in for the rest of his Rutgers tenure, and earned third-team All-Big Ten honors from the league's coaches as well as second-team honors from the media and Phil Steele.

In 2021, Korsak started all 13 games and set college football's all-time record with a 45.3 net average. He was named second-team All-American, first-team all-conference, a finalist for the Ray Guy Award and Rutgers' most valuable player after posting 72 kicks for 3,299 yards. He was named Big Ten Special Teams Player of the Week twice and Ray Guy Player of the Week twice, with 38 of his punts going inside the 20-yard line. After the season, he opted to return for a final year.

Korsak started all 12 games in 2022, recording 75 punts for 3,297 yards (for a gross average of 44.0), including 32 kicks landing inside the 20. He twice earned punter of the week honors, was named first-team All-American by The Sporting News, and despite being named only third-team All-Big Ten, was named the Ray Guy Award winner as the best punter nationally. He was the first first-team All-American at Rutgers since 2006, and by being Ray Guy Award winner became the only player at the school to ever win a national on-field award. His kicks were returned for -11 yards on the year, and in all but one game no positive returns were recorded against him. Against Penn State, he set the NCAA all-time record for career punting yards, and also finished his career as the all-time leader in punts, with 15,318 yards and 349 punts. Korsak ended his stint at Rutgers having not a single punt blocked and a streak of 150 consecutive kicks without a touchback.

== Professional career ==
Pre-draft measurables
Height	Weight	Arm length	Hand span
6 ft 0 7/8 in (1.85 m)	187 lb (85 kg)	29 3/8 in (0.75 m)	8 3/4 in (0.22 m)
All values from NFL Combine

Korsak was selected in the eighth round (61st overall) of the 2023 USFL draft by the New Jersey Generals. He was also drafted in the first round (3rd overall) in the 2023 CFL global draft by the Saskatchewan Roughriders. After going unselected in the 2023 NFL draft, he was invited to rookie minicamps with the Pittsburgh Steelers and Kansas City Chiefs. He then signed with the Roughriders on 21 May 2023. Korsak won the punter job following training camp, displacing the incumbent, Kaare Vedvik. Korsak played in all 18 regular season games in 2023, where he punted 117 times with a 47.9–yard average and had six singles and two special teams tackles.

On May 2, 2025, Korsak was moved to the retired list.
