= Lorenz Metz =

German American football player (born 1997)

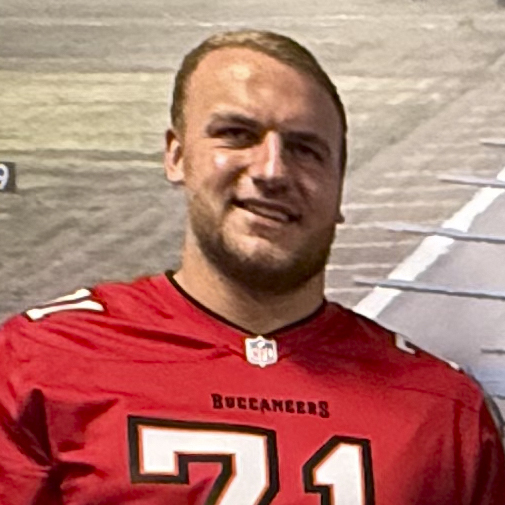
- Metz with the Tampa Bay Buccaneers in 2024

No. 61 – New England Patriots
- Position: Offensive tackle
- Roster status: Practice squad

Personal information
- Born: March 7, 1997 (age 29); Neuötting, Bavaria, Germany
- Listed height: 6 ft 9 in (2.06 m)
- Listed weight: 320 lb (145 kg)

Career information
- College: Cincinnati (2018–2022)
- NFL draft: 2023: undrafted

Career history
- Kirchdorf Wildcats (2017); Chicago Bears (2023)*; Tampa Bay Buccaneers (2024–2025)*; New England Patriots (2025–present)*
- * Offseason or practice squad member only

Awards and highlights
- First-team All-AAC (2021); Second-team Academic All-American (2021)
- Stats at Pro Football Reference

Lorenz Metz (born March 7, 1997) is a German professional American football offensive tackle for the New England Patriots of the National Football League (NFL). He played college football for the Cincinnati Bearcats and previously played for the Chicago Bears and New York Giants before joining the Buccaneers as part of the NFL's International Player Pathway Program.

== Early life ==
Metz was born in Neuötting in Bavaria, Germany. He did not begin playing American football until he was 18 and previously worked as a chemical technician in Germany. Before moving to the United States, he played for the Kirchdorf Wildcats in the German Football League.

== College career ==
Metz moved to the offensive line at Cincinnati, where he appeared in 43 games with 27 starts between 2018 and 2022, playing both tackle and guard. He started all 13 games in 2019 at tackle, played in eight games in 2020, and in 2021 made eight starts at right guard, earning first-team All-AAC honors on an offensive line that helped Cincinnati average 6.7 yards per play. His final college season in 2022 was limited to five games due to injury.

== Professional career ==
Pre-draft measurables
Height	Weight	Arm length	Hand span	Wingspan	40-yard dash	10-yard split	20-yard split	20-yard shuttle	Three-cone drill	Vertical jump	Broad jump	Bench press
6 ft 9 in (2.06 m)	316 lb (143 kg)	34 1/4 in (0.87 m)	10 5/8 in (0.27 m)	7 ft 0 in (2.13 m)	5.30 s	1.83 s	3.00 s	4.82 s	7.63 s	26.5 in (0.67 m)	8 ft 7 in (2.62 m)	26 reps
All values from Pro Day

=== Chicago Bears ===
After going undrafted in the 2023 NFL draft, Metz signed with the Chicago Bears as a college free agent on 6 May 2023 and was waived on 26 July 2023. He later had a tryout with the New York Giants but was not on an NFL roster during the 2023 season.

=== Tampa Bay Buccaneers ===
On 15 April 2024, Metz signed with the Tampa Bay Buccaneers via the NFL's International Player Pathway program; as an IPP player he did not count against the 90-man offseason roster limit. He spent the 2024 season on Tampa Bay’s practice squad under the international exemption and was re-signed to a futures contract after the season, with the club noting his international exception for 2025.

On August 26, 2025, Metz was waived by the Buccaneers as part of final roster cuts and re-signed to the practice squad the next day.

=== New England Patriots ===
On January 13, 2026, Metz was signed to the New England Patriots' practice squad. On February 11, he signed a reserve/futures contract with New England.

On August 30, 2026, Metz was released by the Patriots as a part of final roster cuts. He was re–signed to the team's practice squad the next day.
