= Jevoni Robinson =

Jamaican gridiron football player (born 1992)

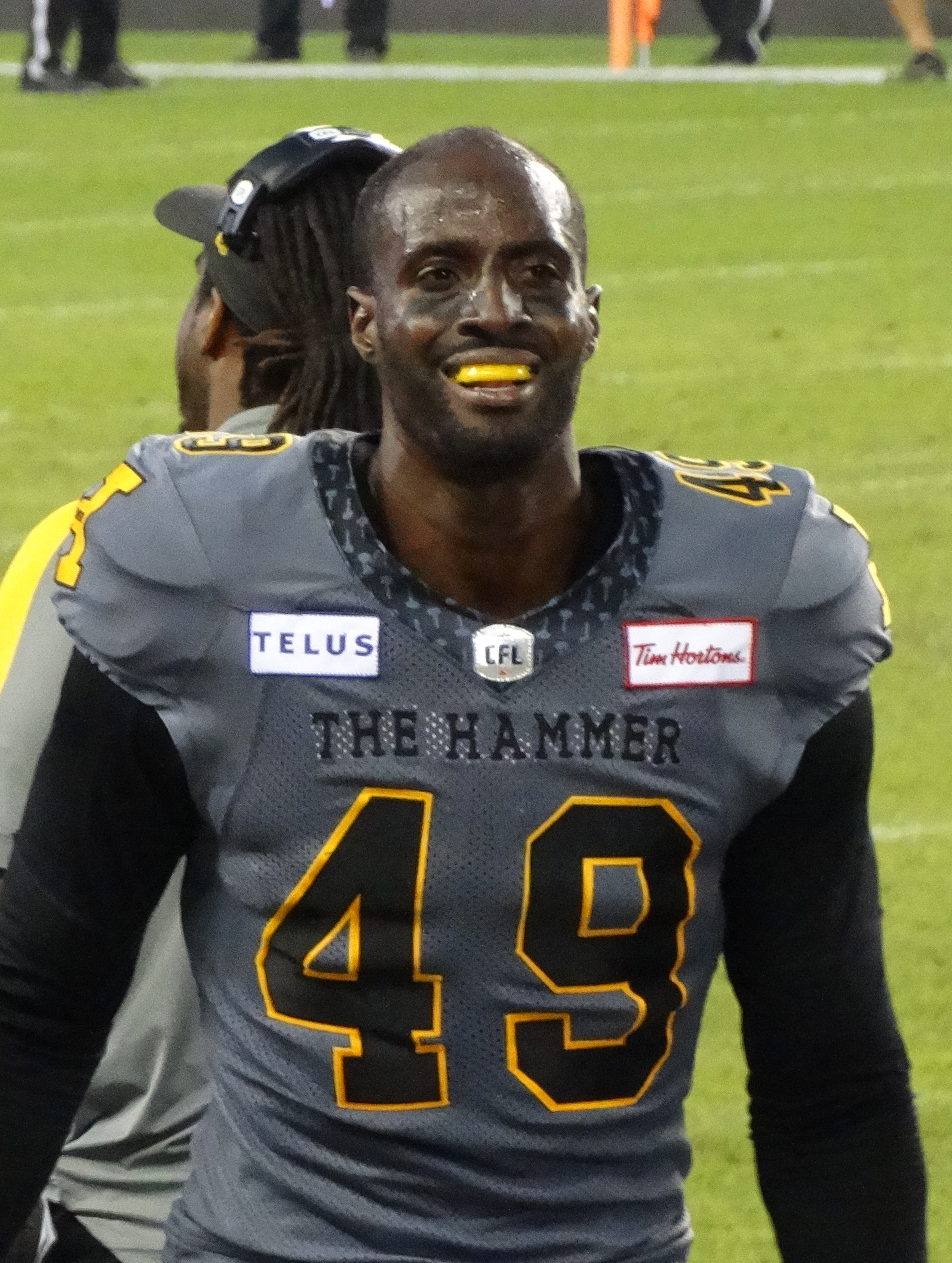
- Robinson with the Hamilton Tiger-Cats in 2024

No. 89 – Ottawa Redblacks
- Position: Wide receiver
- CFL status: Global

Personal information
- Born: November 16, 1992 (age 33); Jamaica
- Listed height: 6 ft 5 in (1.96 m)
- Listed weight: 240 lb (109 kg)

Career information
- High school: Independence (Charlotte, NC)
- College: None
- CFL draft: 2023G: 1st round, 7th overall pick

Career history
- 2017–2018: Houston Texans
- 2019: San Antonio Commanders
- 2023: St. Louis Battlehawks*
- 2023: BC Lions*
- 2024–2026: Hamilton Tiger-Cats
- 2026–present: Ottawa Redblacks
- * Offseason or practice squad member only
- Stats at Pro Football Reference
- Stats at CFL.ca

Jevoni Robinson (born November 16, 1992) is a Jamaican professional Canadian football wide receiver for the Ottawa Redblacks of the Canadian Football League (CFL) and former basketball player. He played college basketball at NC State and Barry. He has also been a member of the Houston Texans of the National Football League (NFL), the San Antonio Commanders of the Alliance of American Football (AAF), the St. Louis Battlehawks of the XFL, and the BC Lions and Hamilton Tiger-Cats of the CFL.

== Early life ==
Robinson was born in Jamaica, growing up participating in cricket, rugby, soccer, and track. He attended Bridgeport High School in Jamaica before moving to the United States and attending Independence High School in Charlotte, North Carolina for his junior and senior years of high school. He only played one season of high school football, as a wide receiver, and only caught one pass. He did not play basketball in high school.

== Basketball career ==
=== NC State ===
Robinson first attended North Carolina Central University as a non-athlete student. After spending one year at North Carolina Central and undergoing a growth spurt, he transferred to North Carolina State University. At NC State, he emailed associate head coach Bobby Lutz to try and get a tryout for the college basketball team but did not receive a response. However, after an NC State team manager saw Robinson dunking in a gym, he ended up making the team.

Robinson played in 12 games for NC State during the 2012–13 season and five games during the 2013–14 season. He only averaged 1.1 minutes a game during his NC State career.

=== Barry ===
Robinson transferred to play basketball at Barry for the 2014–15 season. He played in 31 games, starting two, averaging 5.4 points per game and 6.8 rebounds per game.

=== Italy ===
Robinson played one season for Angri Pallacanestro in Italy.

== Professional football career ==
After only playing football for one year in high school, Robinson was signed to the practice squad of the Houston Texans of the National Football League (NFL) on December 26, 2017, as a tight end. He signed a futures contract on January 1, 2018. He was waived/injured on September 1 and placed on injured reserve on September 2. Robinson was waived from injured reserve on September 12, 2018.

Robinson signed with the San Antonio Commanders of the newly-formed Alliance of American Football (AAF) for the 2019 season. He was waived on March 4, 2019.

Robinson played for the Sea Lions of The Spring League in 2021, catching three passes for 19 yards.

Robinson signed with the St. Louis Battlehawks of the XFL on February 4, 2023. He was released on February 9, 2023.

Robinson was selected by the BC Lions of the Canadian Football League (CFL) with the seventh overall pick, in the first round, of the 2023 CFL global draft. He signed with the team on May 4, 2023. He was moved to the practice roster on June 4, and was released on November 13, 2023.

Robinson was signed by the Hamilton Tiger-Cats of the CFL on January 25, 2024. He dressed in 16 games for the Tiger-Cats in 2024, catching 19 passes for 209 yards and three touchdowns on 23 targets. In 2025, he played in all 18 regular season games where he had 14 receptions for 214 yards and two touchdowns. In 2026, he began the season on the practice roster and reserve roster and did not play in a game with the Tiger-Cats that year.

On July 25, 2026, it was announced that Robinson had been traded to the Ottawa Redblacks in exchange for an eighth-round draft pick in the 2027 CFL draft.
