= Roy Mbaeteka =

Nigerian gridiron football player (born 2000)

No. 78 – Indianapolis Colts
- Position: Offensive tackle
- Roster status: Practice squad

Personal information
- Born: 13 February 2000 (age 26); Anambra, Nigeria
- Listed height: 6 ft 8 in (2.03 m)
- Listed weight: 330 lb (150 kg)

Career information
- NFL draft: 2022: undrafted

Career history
- New York Giants (2022)*; Chicago Bears (2023)*; Cleveland Browns (2024)*; Arizona Cardinals (2025)*; Miami Dolphins (2025)*; Indianapolis Colts (2026–present)*
- * Offseason or practice squad member only
- Stats at Pro Football Reference

Roy Mbaeteka (born 13 February 2000) is a Nigerian professional American football offensive tackle for the Indianapolis Colts of the National Football League (NFL).

== Career ==
Mbaeteka was born in Anambra, Nigeria and never played high school or college football.

=== New York Giants ===
He was initially signed by the New York Giants on 8 April 2022, from the International Player Pathway Program. He was waived by the Giants during final roster cuts on 30 August, but re-signed with team's practice squad the following day. Mbaeteka was cut by the Giants on 29 September. He was re-signed on 7 December but was released on 14 December.

=== Chicago Bears ===
On 4 May 2023, Mbaeteka was signed by the Chicago Bears via the International Player Pathway Program. He was waived on 29 August and re-signed to the practice squad. Mbaeteka signed a reserve/future contract with the team on 8 January 2024 but was released on 15 March.

=== Cleveland Browns ===
On 29 April 2024, Mbaeteka signed with the Cleveland Browns. He was waived on 26 August and subsequently re-signed to the team's practice squad. Mbaeteka signed a reserve/future contract with Cleveland on 6 January 2025. On 11 August, Mbaeteka was waived by the Browns.

=== Arizona Cardinals ===
On 12 August 2025, Mbaeteka was claimed off waivers by the Arizona Cardinals. He was waived on 25 August and re-signed to the practice squad two days later. On 2 September, Mbaeteka was waived from the practice squad.

=== Miami Dolphins ===
On 23 September 2025, Mbaeteka signed with the Miami Dolphins' practice squad.

=== Indianapolis Colts ===
On 18 August 2026, Mbaeteka signed with the Indianapolis Colts. On 30 August, Mbaeteka was waived by Indianapolis as a part of final roster cuts; he was re-signed to the team's practice squad the next day.
