= 2023 CFL global draft =

Canadian football draft

General information
- Sport: Canadian football
- Date: May 2, 2023
- Time: 11:00 am EDT
- Location: Toronto

Overview
- 18 total selections in 2 rounds
- League: CFL
- First selection: Blessman Ta’ala, Ottawa Redblacks
- U Sports selections: 0
- NCAA selections: 15

The 2023 CFL global draft was a selection of non-Canadian and non-American players by Canadian Football League (CFL) teams that took place on May 2, 2023. It was the third CFL draft that pooled all of the global players together after previously having separate drafts for Mexican players and European players in 2019.

== Draft format ==
This year's draft featured two rounds with a total of 18 selections. This was reduced from three rounds in 2022 and from four rounds in 2021. This year's global draft was also the first to be based solely on the waiver priority order (reverse standings from the previous year) and the first to have the same order in each round (as opposed to a snake order draft).

== Draft order ==
=== Round one ===
Pick #	CFL team	Player	Position	University/club team	Nationality
1	Ottawa Redblacks	Blessman Ta’ala	DL	Hawaii	American Samoa
2	Edmonton Elks	Dean Faithfull	K	Colorado State-Pueblo	(United Kingdom) Great Britain
3	Saskatchewan Roughriders	Adam Korsak	P	Rutgers	Australia
4	Hamilton Tiger-Cats	Penei Pavihi	LB	Hawaii	American Samoa
5	Montreal Alouettes	Simon Lars Sandberg	DL	Oregon State	Sweden
6	Calgary Stampeders	Isaac Moore	OL	Temple	Sweden
7	BC Lions	Jevoni Robinson	WR	Barry	Jamaica
8	Winnipeg Blue Bombers	Jamieson Sheahan	P	California	Australia
9	Toronto Argonauts	Alfredo Gachuz Lozada	K	ITESM CEM	Mexico

=== Round two ===
Pick #	CFL team	Player	Position	University/club team	Nationality
10	Ottawa Redblacks	Lucas Lavin	OL	Chattanooga	Sweden
11	Edmonton Elks	Kilian Zierer	OL	Auburn	Germany
12	Saskatchewan Roughriders	Habakkuk Baldonado	DL	Pittsburgh	Italy
13	Hamilton Tiger-Cats	Lou Hedley	P	Miami (FL)	Australia
14	Montreal Alouettes	Rhys Byrns	P	Louisiana-Lafayette	Australia
15	Calgary Stampeders	Lino Schröter	LB	Cologne Crocodiles	Germany
16	BC Lions	Junior Aho	DL	Southern Methodist	France
17	Winnipeg Blue Bombers	Karl Schmitz	P	Jacksonville	Bermuda
18	Toronto Argonauts	Emmanuel Falola	LB	Bristol Aztecs	(United Kingdom) Great Britain

== Trades ==
In the explanations below, (D) denotes trades that took place during the draft, while (PD) indicates trades completed pre-draft.

=== Round three ===
Note: These trades were made prior to the league revealing the number of rounds for this draft.

- Calgary → Saskatchewan (PD). Calgary traded this selection and a seventh-round selection in the 2023 CFL national draft to Saskatchewan in exchange for James Smith.
- Saskatchewan → Calgary (PD). Saskatchewan traded this selection originally acquired from Calgary back to Calgary in exchange for James Smith.
