= Praise Olatoke =

British Nigerian gridiron football player

Profile
- Position: Wide receiver

Personal information
- Born: June 23, 2000 (age 26); Lagos, Nigeria
- Listed height: 6 ft 2 in (1.88 m)
- Listed weight: 197 lb (89 kg)

Career information
- High school: St Columba's School, Kilmacolm
- College: Ohio State (2021–2022)
- University: Trinity Western (2019–2020)
- NFL draft: 2024: undrafted

Career history
- Los Angeles Chargers (2024)*; Carolina Panthers (2024)*
- * Offseason or practice squad member only
- Stats at Pro Football Reference

Praise Olatoke (born June 23, 2000) is a Nigerian-Scottish sprinter and professional American football wide receiver. He ran track for the Trinity Western Spartans and Ohio State Buckeyes and also played one year of club football at Ohio State. Olatoke signed with the NFL's Los Angeles Chargers in 2024 through the International Player Pathway (IPP) program.

== Early life and track career ==
Olatoke was born on June 23, 2000, in Lagos, Nigeria. When he was age five, his family moved Glasgow, Scotland. He grew up playing several sports, including rugby and soccer, but performed best in track and field as a sprinter. He attended St Columba's School, Kilmacolm, where he played rugby and ran track, performing well enough to receive an athletic scholarship overseas at Trinity Western University in Canada.

Olatoke was a member of the Scottish national track team and was chosen the Scottish U20 Athlete of the Year in 2019. He was a member of the Great Britain team at the 2019 European Athletics U20 Championships, competing in the 200 metres. In his first year at Trinity Western, in 2019, he participated at the U Sports Championships and placed sixth in the 60 metres, clocking a time of 6.90 seconds. He set the school 60 metres record in January 2020 with a time of 6.82 and later broke it again at that year's U Sports Championships, placing second with a mark of 6.75. In addition to setting the school record in the 60 metres, he also set the record in the 300 metres.

Olatoke transferred to Ohio State University in the U.S. in 2021, where he spent two seasons on the school's track team, although he missed one due to a torn achilles tendon. In 2022, he won first-team All-Big Ten honors for outdoor track and ran a 10.27 100 metres at the Outdoor Championships. He also was a member of the 4 × 100 metres relay team and helped them win a Big Ten title. After track, in the fall of 2022 Olatoke joined the Ohio State club football team.

== College football career ==
At age 15, Olatoke became interested in American football. After he used his remaining track eligibility, he still had enough time remaining to join the Buckeyes club football team, and became a wide receiver. He had "nine or 10" practices, according to the head coach, to learn the idea of the game, as Olatoke said he "knew nothing" of how to play it. His teammates had to help him put on football equipment, as he had never worn them before. Following his first game, in which he struggled with multiple penalties, he improved and caught a 65-yard touchdown pass in his second game. He ended the season with seven receptions for 231 yards and four touchdowns.

Olatoke received a degree in sports business from Ohio State in December 2022. He considered enrolling in graduate school in order to tryout for the Ohio State varsity football team but ultimately decided not to, getting a job at a gym.

== Professional career ==
Pre-draft measurables
Height	Weight	Arm length	Hand span	Wingspan	40-yard dash	10-yard split	20-yard split	20-yard shuttle	Three-cone drill	Vertical jump	Broad jump	Bench press
6 ft 2 1/8 in (1.88 m)	197 lb (89 kg)	32 3/8 in (0.82 m)	9 in (0.23 m)	6 ft 6 in (1.98 m)	4.36 s	1.53 s	2.50 s	4.90 s	7.12 s	30.0 in (0.76 m)	10 ft 3 in (3.12 m)	15 reps
All values from Pro Day

In 2023, he contacted a number of players and the NFL Academy in Great Britain in hopes of earning a spot with the National Football League's International Player Pathway Program (IPPP), which is designed to give foreign players opportunities in the league. He earned a tryout in August 2023 and later made the cut, then spending 10 weeks training at IMG Academy in Florida. He attended the IMG pro day in March 2024, where he ran a 4.36-second 40-yard dash.

In May 2024, Olatoke was invited to the rookie minicamp of the Philadelphia Eagles, but was not signed. On June 14, 2024, after a successful tryout, he was signed by the Los Angeles Chargers. He was waived by the Chargers on August 12, 2024.

On September 2, 2024, Olatoke was signed to the Carolina Panthers practice squad.
