= International Player Pathway =

NFL program for non-American players

International Player Pathway (IPP) is a program run by the National Football League (NFL) to increase the number of players from outside the United States or Canada in the NFL. The program was formed as part of the NFL's strategy to grow globally as it provides athletes with the opportunity to play in the league. Its aim is to increase the pool of talent and ultimately drive global fan growth.

== Background ==
The International Player Pathway (IPP) program was not the first initiative by the NFL to introduce foreign talent into its pool of players and neither is it, as yet, the longest running. The first such program was the NFL International Development Practice Squad Program that ran between 2004 and 2009. Following a short hiatus of seven years there was a single incarnation of NFL Undiscovered in 2016 and building immediately on the success of that trial the IPPP was instituted in 2017.

=== NFL International Development Practice Squad Program ===
The NFL International Practice Squad Program was an initiative run by the NFL in which selected players from outside the United States or Canada were assigned to the practice squads of NFL teams. The program began in 2004 and was concluded five years later in 2009 but during that time many players from a multitude of nations were given the opportunity to play in the NFL or other professional football leagues like the Arena Football League, the United Football League and the Canadian Football League.

=== NFL Undiscovered ===
Two British-born former NFL players, Aden Durde (NFLUK head of football development) and two-time Super Bowl winner Osi Umenyiora, were concerned that there were no clear pathways into the NFL for players who had not gone to high school and/or college in the United States, and, as a result, the NFL was potentially missing out on some exceptional players. Wanting to remedy this, in early 2016, they used their personal and professional contacts from their time in the NFL to create a training program and to set up meetings and tryouts with NFL teams for a small number of specially selected football players. These players' potential had been scouted primarily by watching YouTube videos. The initial group of players all lived, worked and played amateur football in Europe. At the time, the program was not yet officially named the International Player Pathway, but it was fully sanctioned and supported by the NFL. Additionally, the League had commissioned a mini-series documentary to be made, called NFL Undiscovered, that followed the participants of the program.

In 2017, the IPP was implemented with systems for choosing which division sponsors the program annually, as well as special regulations applying to the teams being assigned the players. The program has grown every year since its launch and, as of 2020, more than half (19 of 32) of all NFL teams have signed international players as a direct result of the program.

== Eligibility ==
In 2017, potential applicants to NFL Undiscovered were asked to meet specific requirements and were advised to follow a particular application process. Some of these criteria have either changed over time or there is some discretion applied during the selection process, as not all the athletes that have come through the program in the intervening years meet all of the following criteria.

- age 24 or younger
- out of high school (or equivalent) for at least four years
- did not play football at an American college
- ability to speak English
- not a citizen of the U.S. or Canada
- must be available and eligible to travel to the U.S. for two months from the first week in March

== Roster regulations ==
The NFL has specific regulations for players that sign through the IPP. The teams to which each IPP player is assigned are allowed 91 players on their off-season rosters, one more than those teams that are not participating in the IPP that year. At the point when these rosters need to be cut to 53 (at the end of pre-season), the participating teams must decide the status of their IPP players.

First, the team can keep their IPP player on their 53-man roster. If they waive the player, he goes through the NFL's waiver system, which allows him to be claimed by another team. If he clears waivers, the team can sign the player to their practice squad. If they do, they may elect to take an exemption for the IPP player, giving them an extra spot on their practice squad. If they utilize the exemption, that player cannot be signed to the active roster of any team during the season, but starting in 2024 the player can be elevated for up to three games. If the exemption is declined, the player is treated like any other practice squad player, and can be promoted to a team's active roster. If the player chooses to sign with a team other than the one to which he was assigned, that team may not claim the exemption.

== Notable participants ==
Players who participated in the NFL Undiscovered and International Player Pathway programs
Season	Player	Nationality	Background	Position	Drafted	Debut team	Ref
2016	Anthony Dablé	France	Football	Wide receiver	No	New York Giants	
2016	Moritz Böhringer	Germany	Football	Wide receiver	Yes	Minnesota Vikings	
2017	Alex Gray	United Kingdom	Rugby union	Tight end	No	Atlanta Falcons	
2017	Eric Nzeocha	Germany	Football	Linebacker	No	Tampa Bay Buccaneers	
2017	Efe Obada	United Kingdom	Football	Defensive end	No	Carolina Panthers	
2018	Christopher Ezeala	Germany	Football	Running back	No	Baltimore Ravens	
2018	Jordan Mailata	Australia	Rugby league	Offensive tackle	Yes	Philadelphia Eagles	
2018	Tigie Sankoh	United Kingdom	Football	Defensive back	No	Cleveland Browns	
2018	Christian Scotland-Williamson	United Kingdom	Rugby union	Tight end	No	Pittsburgh Steelers	
2019	Valentine Holmes	Australia	Rugby league	Running back	No	New York Jets	
2019	Jakob Johnson	Germany	Football	Fullback	No	New England Patriots	
2019	Durval Queiroz Neto	Brazil	Football	Defensive tackle	No	Miami Dolphins	
2019	Christian Wade	United Kingdom	Rugby union	Running back	No	Buffalo Bills	
2020	Isaac Alarcón	Mexico	Football	Offensive tackle	No	Dallas Cowboys	
2020	David Bada	Germany	Football	Defensive tackle	No	Washington Football Team	
2020	Matt Leo	Australia	Australian rules	Defensive end	No	Philadelphia Eagles	
2020	Sandro Platzgummer	Austria	Football	Running back	No	New York Giants	
2021	Aaron Donkor	Germany	Football	Defensive end	No	Seattle Seahawks	
2021	Alfredo Gutiérrez	Mexico	Football	Offensive tackle	No	San Francisco 49ers	
2021	Max Pircher	Italy	Handball	Offensive tackle	No	Los Angeles Rams	
2021	Sammis Reyes	Chile	Basketball	Tight end	No	Washington Football Team	
2021	Bernhard Seikovits	Austria	Football	Tight end	No	Arizona Cardinals	
2022	Marcel Dabo	Germany	Football	Cornerback	No	Indianapolis Colts	
2022	Roy Mbaeteka	Nigeria	Football	Offensive tackle	No	New York Giants	
2022	Haggai Ndubuisi	Nigeria	Football	Offensive tackle	No	Arizona Cardinals	
2022	Adedayo Odeleye	United Kingdom	Football	Defensive end	No	Houston Texans	
2022	Thomas Odukoya	Netherlands	Football	Tight end	No	Tennessee Titans	
2022	Kehinde Oginni Hassan	Nigeria	Basketball	Defensive end	No	Kansas City Chiefs	
2022	Ayo Oyelola	United Kingdom	Football	Strong safety	No	Jacksonville Jaguars	
2023	Junior Aho	France	Football	Defensive line	No	Minnesota Vikings	
2023	C. J. Okoye	Nigeria	Basketball	Defensive line	No	Los Angeles Chargers	
2023	Haggai Ndubuisi	Nigeria	Football	Offensive tackle	No	Denver Broncos	
2023	David Ebuka Agoha	Nigeria	Basketball	Defensive line	No	Las Vegas Raiders	
2023	Chukwuebuka Godrick	Nigeria	Basketball	Offensive tackle	No	Kansas City Chiefs	
2023	Kenneth Odumegwu	Nigeria	Basketball	Defensive line	No	Green Bay Packers	
2024	Louis Rees-Zammit	United Kingdom	Rugby union	Running back	No	Kansas City Chiefs	
2024	Charlie Smyth	Ireland	Gaelic football	Placekicker	No	New Orleans Saints	
2024	Lorenz Metz	Germany	Football	Offensive lineman	No	Tampa Bay Buccaneers	
2024	Patrick Murtagh	Australia	Australian rules	Tight end	No	Jacksonville Jaguars	
2024	Travis Clayton	United Kingdom	Rugby union	Offensive guard	Yes	Buffalo Bills	
2024	Bayron Matos	Dominican Republic	Basketball	Offensive tackle	No	Miami Dolphins	
2024	Jotham Russell	Australia	Rugby league	Defensive end	No	New England Patriots	
2024	Praise Olatoke	Nigeria	Track and field	Wide receiver	No	Los Angeles Chargers	
2024	Jude McAtamney	Ireland	Gaelic football	Placekicker	No	New York Giants	
2024	Laekin Vakalahi	Australia	Rugby league	Offensive tackle	No	Philadelphia Eagles	
2024	Denzel Daxon	The Bahamas	Football	Defensive tackle	No	Dallas Cowboys	
2024	Thomas Yassmin	Australia	Football	Tight end	No	Denver Broncos	
2024	David Olajiga	United Kingdom	Football	Defensive tackle	No	Los Angeles Rams	
2024	Alex Hale	Australia	Football	Placekicker	No	Green Bay Packers	
2024	Julius Welschof	Germany	Football	Linebacker	No	Pittsburgh Steelers	
2024	Kilian Zierer	Germany	Football	Offensive tackle	No	Houston Texans	
2025	Lenny Krieg	Germany	Football	Placekicker	No	Atlanta Falcons	
2025	Jordan Petaia	Australia	Rugby union	Tight end	No	Los Angeles Chargers	
2025	T. J. Maguranyanga	Zimbabwe	Rugby union	Defensive end	No	Washington Commanders	
2025	Dante Barnett	United Kingdom	Football	Defensive tackle	No	Cincinnati Bengals	
2025	Mapalo Mwansa	United Kingdom	Football	Defensive end	No	Carolina Panthers	
2025	Leander Wiegand	Germany	Football	Offensive tackle	No	New York Jets	
2025	Laki Tasi	Australia	Rugby union	Defensive lineman	No	Las Vegas Raiders	
2025	Oscar Chapman	Australia	Football	Punter	No	Minnesota Vikings	
2025	Mark McNamee	Ireland	Gaelic football	Placekicker	No	Green Bay Packers	
2025	Maximilian Mang	Germany	Football	Tight end	No	Indianapolis Colts	
2025	Federico Maranges	Puerto Rico	Football	Offensive guard	No	Seattle Seahawks	
2025	Valentin Senn	Austria	Football	Offensive tackle	No	Arizona Cardinals	
2025	Luke Felix-Fualalo	Australia	Football	Offensive tackle	No	Philadelphia Eagles	
2026	Seydou Traore	United Kingdom	Football	Tight end	Yes	Miami Dolphins	
2026	Uar Bernard	Nigeria	Football	Defensive end	Yes	Philadelphia Eagles	
