= Kevin Foelsch =

American football player (born 2001)

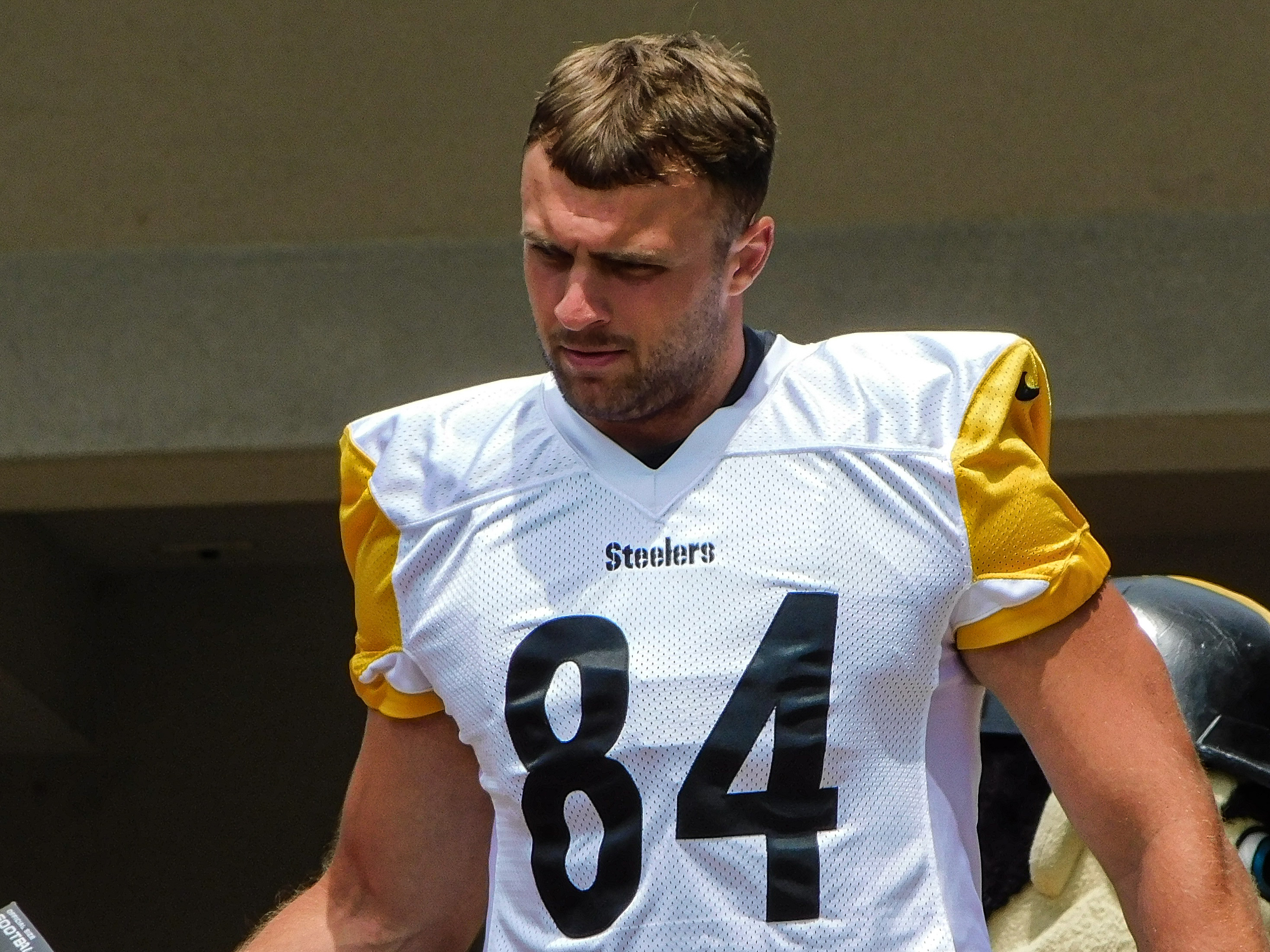
- Foelsch with the Pittsburgh Steelers in 2025

Profile
- Position: Tight end

Personal information
- Born: April 13, 2001 (age 25); Ramsey, New Jersey, U.S.
- Listed height: 6 ft 4 in (1.93 m)
- Listed weight: 250 lb (113 kg)

Career information
- High school: Ramsey (Ramsey, New Jersey)
- College: New Haven (2019–2023)
- NFL draft: 2024: undrafted

Career history
- Carolina Panthers (2024)*; New York Jets (2024)*; Philadelphia Eagles (2024)*; Kansas City Chiefs (2025)*; Pittsburgh Steelers (2025)*
- * Offseason or practice squad member only
- Stats at Pro Football Reference

Kevin Foelsch (born April 13, 2001) is an American professional football tight end. He played college football for the New Haven Chargers.

== Early life ==
He was a three-year varsity football player at Ramsey High School in Ramsey, New Jersey. He was given First Team All-American Red League and Second Team All-County honors during his time with the Rams.

In 2018, NJ.com also recognized his performance by naming him to the All-Group Second Team. In addition to football, he was a multi-sport athlete, competing in basketball for four years and participating in track and field for three seasons.

== College career ==
Foelsch began his college career at the University of New Haven in 2019, appearing in nine games primarily on special teams while earning academic honors with spots on the Northeast-10 Academic Honor Roll and the New Haven Dean’s List. In 2020, his season was canceled due to the COVID-19 pandemic, though he continued to excel academically. Returning to the field in 2021, he started all 12 games at tight end, recording 151 yards on 16 catches with four touchdowns. He also contributed on special teams with four tackles and a recovered kickoff. In 2022, he again started every game, finishing with 25 receptions for 191 yards and five touchdowns—second most among the team’s receivers—including a career-high 74-yard performance against American International. He scored multiple touchdowns in games against AIC and Franklin Pierce and added a 10-yard kick return. In 2023, he caught a career high seven touchdowns.

== Professional career ==
=== Carolina Panthers ===
After going undrafted in the 2024 NFL draft, Foelsch signed with the Carolina Panthers on April 29, 2024. He was waived following the team’s rookie camp on May 13.

=== New York Jets ===
On May 22, 2024, Foelsch signed with the New York Jets. He was waived following the Jets' training camp on August 2.

=== Philadelphia Eagles ===
The Philadelphia Eagles claimed Foelsch off waivers on August 3, 2024. He saw playing time during Philadelphia’s preseason games before signing with their practice squad. Foelsch was released by the Eagles on December 24.

=== Kansas City Chiefs ===
On June 11, 2025, Foelsch signed a one-year contract with the Kansas City Chiefs. He was waived by Kansas City on June 20.

=== Pittsburgh Steelers ===
In the midst of training camp on July 30, 2025, Foelsch signed a one-year contract with the Pittsburgh Steelers. He was released during preliminary roster cuts on August 22.
