= Steve Addington =

American NASCAR crew chief (born 1964)

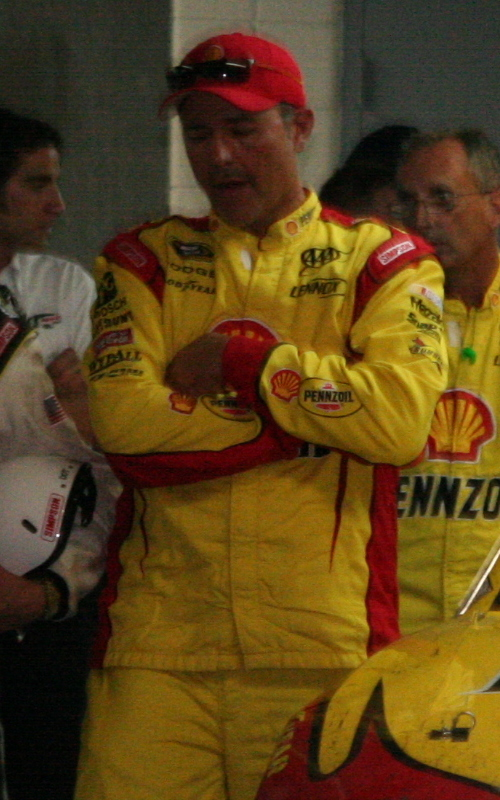
- Addington in 2011

Personal information
- Born: Steven J. Addington; July 4, 1964 (age 62) Spartanburg, South Carolina, U.S.

Sport
- Country: United States
- Sport: NASCAR O'Reilly Auto Parts Series
- Team: 92. DGM Racing

Steven J. Addington (born July 4, 1964) is an American NASCAR crew chief who works for DGM Racing as the crew chief of their No. 92 Chevrolet Camaro SS in the NASCAR O'Reilly Auto Parts Series driven by Josh Williams. He has won 20 NASCAR Cup Series races and 11 Xfinity Series races as a crew chief.

Addington started his crew chiefing career in 1993 in the Xfinity Series when it was known as the NASCAR Busch Series for Jason Keller's own team, KEL Racing. In 1997, he left for Billy Ballew Motorsports in the Truck Series and came back to Keller's No. 57 car in 1999, now owned by Progressive Motorsports/ppc Racing. In 2004, he became a crew chief for Joe Gibbs Racing in the Busch Series and the Cup Series. He worked as a Cup Series crew chief for Team Penske in 2010 and 2011, Stewart–Haas Racing in 2012 and 2013, and HScott Motorsports in 2014, 2015 and 2016. He was also the competition director at HScott in addition to being a crew chief for one of the team's cars. After being out of the sport after HScott closed down after the 2016 season, he returned in 2022 and worked for RSS Racing from 2022 to 2024 as an Xfinity Series crew chief.

== Racing career ==
Addington worked as Jason Keller's crew chief in the Busch Series, and the combination collected ten wins.

Addington worked in 2004 as the Joe Gibbs Racing crew chief for their No. 20 NASCAR Busch Series driven by Mike Bliss, who finished fifth in points. Bliss also part-time in the Cup Series for JGR in a fourth car for the team, the No. 80, and Addington was also his crew chief in that series.

In 2005, Addington became the crew chief for Joe Gibbs Racing's No. 18 car in the NASCAR Cup Series driven by Bobby Labonte, replacing Michael "Fatback" McSwain. Labonte left for Petty Enterprises and was replaced by J. J. Yeley in 2006. Kyle Busch replaced Yeley as the driver of the No. 18 car in 2008 and Addington remained as the crew chief. JGR also switched from Chevrolet to Toyota that year. On March 9, 2008, Addington scored his first win as a NASCAR Sprint Cup crew chief when the 18 team won the Kobalt Tools 500 at Atlanta Motor Speedway and he was also awarded the "Crew Chief of the Race". Busch lead the points with eight wins going into the Chase for the Cup. The team had numerous problems as soon as the Chase started, such as engine failures and wrecks, and Busch finished tenth in the twelve drivers in the Chase. Addington was named the DirecTV Crew Chief of the Year Award at NASCAR's award banquet. Busch ended the season with 21 victories in NASCAR's big three divisions (Sprint Cup, Nationwide, and Craftsman Truck Series), which was seven more wins that any driver had made since the Craftsman Truck Series began in 1995. Busch said "I think the final ten races certainly humbled all of us. Everyone already had virtually guaranteed us the championship after seeing the first 26 races, but it changed so quickly." After Busch missed the 2009 Chase, Addington was relieved of his crew chief duties with three races left in the 2009 season was replaced by Dave Rogers.

On December 14, 2009, it was reported that Addington would become the next crew chief for Kyle's brother Kurt Busch at Team Penske, replacing outgoing crew chief Pat Tryson, who had been relieved of his duties following the 2009 Sprint Cup Season. In 2011, Addington and Busch would move from Penske's No. 2 car to the team's new No. 22 car.

Addington ended his tenure as Busch's crew chief at the end of 2011. He joined Stewart–Haas Racing as the crew chief of the team's No. 14 Chevrolet, driven by SHR owner/driver Tony Stewart and Team Chevy, taking over for 2011 Sprint Cup championship-winning crew chief Darian Grubb. Addington and Stewart had previously worked together at Joe Gibbs Racing.

Addington missed the race at Talladega in October 2013 as his wife was about to give birth to a child. SHR competition director Greg Zipadelli filled in as the crew chief for the No. 14 car in that race, which was driven by Austin Dillon as Stewart had been injured in a dirt racing crash before the race at Watkins Glen which sidelined him for the rest of the season.

Addington was relieved of his duties as crew chief of the No. 14 on November 19, 2013. On November 21, 2013, it was announced that Addington would join HScott Motorsports in 2014 as the crew chief of their No. 51 car, driven by Justin Allgaier, as well as the team's competition director. In 2016, Allgaier went back to the Xfinity Series was replaced by Clint Bowyer and the car was renumbered to the No. 15.

In 2016, HScott Motorsports closed down after the end of the season, leaving Addington a free agent. He remained without a crew chiefing job for five years.

In 2022, Addington returned to NASCAR and became the crew chief for the No. 38 car for RSS Racing in the Xfinity Series driven by C. J. McLaughlin and Parker Retzlaff. In 2023, he returned to crew chief the RSS No. 38 car, primarily driven by Joe Graf Jr. For the season-opener at Daytona, Graf Jr. and Ryan Sieg switched rides with Sieg driving the No. 38 and Graf driving the No. 39, with Addington crew chiefing Sieg in that race. For the next two races at Fontana and Las Vegas, Graf drove the No. 19 car for Joe Gibbs Racing instead with Kyle Sieg, Ryan's brother, moving from RSS's No. 28 car to the No. 38 and Alex Labbé driving the No. 28. Addington and Brad Parrott, normally the crew chief of the No. 28 car, switched cars for these races with Addington crew chiefing the No. 28 driven by Labbé and Parrott crew chiefing the No. 38 driven by Kyle Sieg.

== Personal life ==
Addington was born in Spartanburg, South Carolina. As a kid, he was a fan of dirt track races. At the age of 14, Addington's mother remarried and then the family moved to Batesville, Arkansas where his stepfather began working for Mark Martin.

Although his stepfather worked in racing, Addington preferred to play football as a child. He graduated from Central High School in Texas and moved back to Spartanburg. Addington's start in racing came as he helped friends compete in dirt cars.

Addington has a daughter named Ashlyn. He left qualifying early for the June 2008 race at Dover to attend Ashlyn's graduation from Boiling Springs High School in Boiling Springs, South Carolina. He also has another child who was born in October 2013. Because the baby was about to be born around the time of the race at Talladega that month, Addington did not crew chief the No. 14 SHR car in that race.
