= 2023 Minnesota Vikings season =

63rd season in franchise history

- Owner: Zygi Wilf
- General manager: Kwesi Adofo-Mensah
- Head coach: Kevin O'Connell
- Home stadium: U.S. Bank Stadium

Results
- Record: 7–10
- Division place: 3rd NFC North
- Playoffs: Did not qualify
- All-Pros: LS Andrew DePaola (2nd team)
- Pro Bowlers: FB C. J. Ham (alternate); OLB Danielle Hunter (starter); LS Andrew DePaola (starter)

Uniform
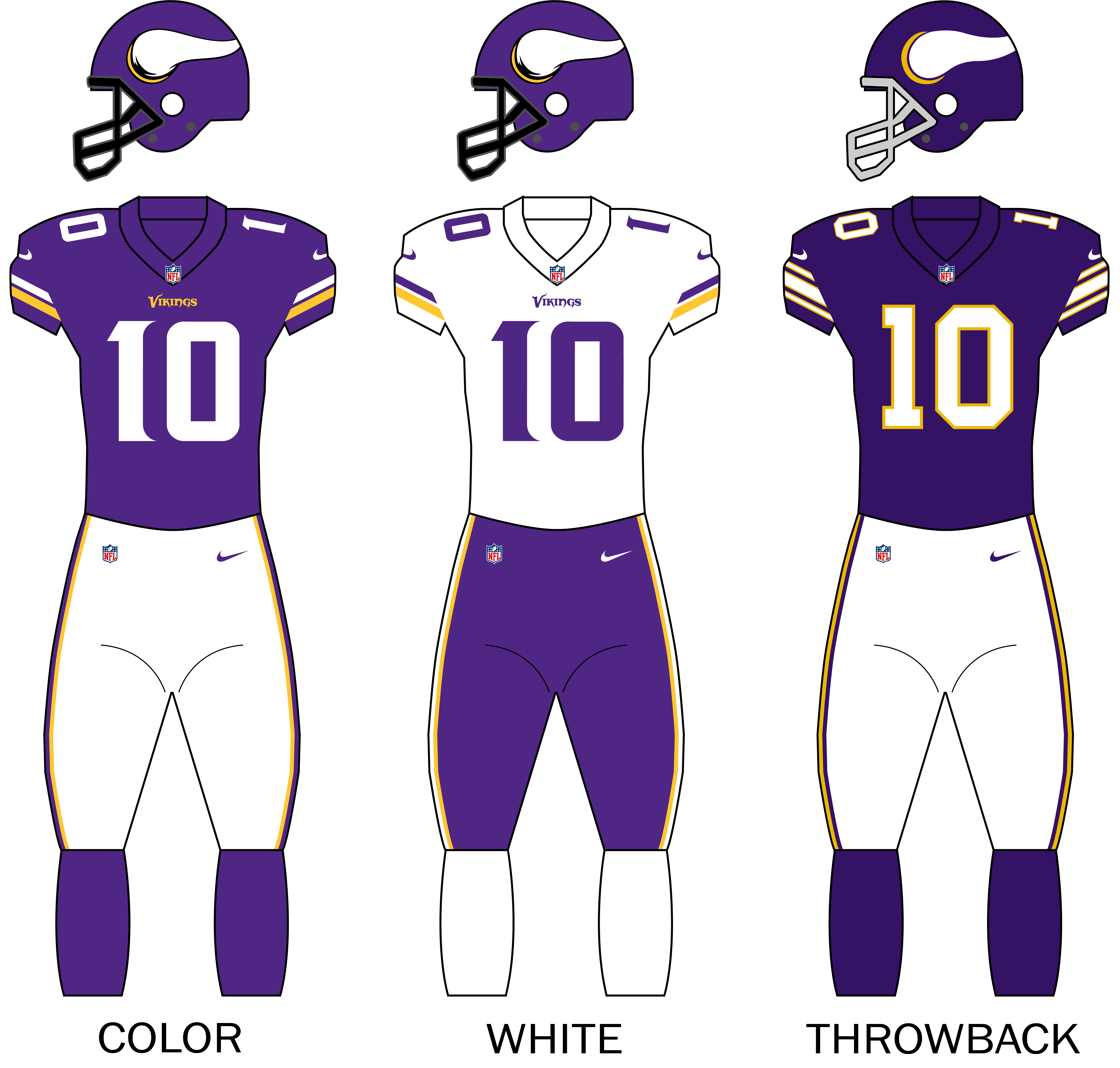

The 2023 season was the Minnesota Vikings' 63rd in the National Football League (NFL), their eighth playing their home games at U.S. Bank Stadium and their second under the head coach/general manager tandem of Kevin O'Connell and Kwesi Adofo-Mensah.

They started 0–3 for the second time in the past four seasons. They failed to improve upon their 13–4 record from 2022 after a Week 5 loss to the eventual back to back Super Bowl champion Kansas City Chiefs and match that record with a Week 11 loss to the Broncos. However, after having a 1–4 record, the Vikings would win 5 games straight, going to a 6–4 record. During Minnesota's Week 8 game against their division rival, the Green Bay Packers, starting quarterback Kirk Cousins ruptured his achilles tendon, ruling him out for the rest of the season. They went through a quarterback carousel for the rest of the season, going 1–6 in their last 7 games including 4 straight losses to end the season. In Week 16, they were knocked out of division contention following a loss to the Detroit Lions, and in Week 18, they were eliminated from playoff contention after losing to the Lions again.

For the first time since 2012, wide receiver Adam Thielen was not on the roster, as he was released on March 10. Additionally, for the first time since 2016, four-time Pro Bowl running back Dalvin Cook was not on the roster, as he was released on June 9. This was also the first season after the death of legendary coach and team advisor Bud Grant on March 11.

== Offseason ==
=== Additions ===
Position	Player	Former team	Date
WR	Brandon Powell	Los Angeles Rams	Signed on March 22
LB	Troy Reeder	Los Angeles Chargers	Signed on March 22
TE	Josh Oliver	Baltimore Ravens	Signed on March 15
DE	Dean Lowry	Green Bay Packers	Signed on March 20
OLB	Marcus Davenport	New Orleans Saints	Signed on March 15
CB	Byron Murphy	Arizona Cardinals	Signed on March 15
CB	Joejuan Williams	New England Patriots	Signed on April 17

=== Subtractions ===
Position	Player	New team	Date
WR	Adam Thielen	Carolina Panthers	Released on March 10
LB	Eric Kendricks	Los Angeles Chargers	Released on March 6
TE	Irv Smith Jr.	Cincinnati Bengals	
CB	Kris Boyd	Arizona Cardinals	
CB	Cameron Dantzler	Washington Commanders	
CB	Chandon Sullivan	Pittsburgh Steelers	
CB	Patrick Peterson	Pittsburgh Steelers	
CB	Duke Shelley	Las Vegas Raiders	
OLB	Za'Darius Smith	Cleveland Browns	Traded on May 16
DT	Dalvin Tomlinson	Cleveland Browns	
C	Greg Mancz	Buffalo Bills	Released on January 14
RB	Dalvin Cook	New York Jets	Released on June 9

=== 2023 draft ===
2023 Minnesota Vikings draft selections
Round	Selection	Player	Position	College	Notes
1	23	Jordan Addison	WR	USC	
2	55	Traded to the Detroit Lions (Note: The Vikings traded a second-round selection (55th overall) and a 2024 third-round selection to the Detroit Lions in exchange for a fourth-round selection (119th overall), a conditional 2024 fourth-round selection and TE T. J. Hockenson. The 2024 fourth-round selection would have become a fifth-rounder if the Vikings won a playoff game in 2022.)			
3	87	Traded to the San Francisco 49ers (Note: The Vikings traded a third-round selection (87th overall) to the San Francisco 49ers in exchange for third-, fifth- and seventh-round selections (102nd, 164th and 222nd overall).)			
3	102	Mekhi Blackmon	CB	USC	From 49ers
4	119	Traded to the Kansas City Chiefs (Note: The Vikings traded a fourth-round selection (119th overall) to the Kansas City Chiefs in exchange for a fourth-round selection (134th overall) and a 2024 fifth-round selection.)			From Lions
4	126	Traded to the Cleveland Browns (Note: The Vikings traded a fourth-round selection (126th overall) and a 2022 fifth-round selection to the Cleveland Browns in exchange for a 2022 fourth-round selection.)			
4	134	Jay Ward	S	LSU	From Chiefs
5	141	Jaquelin Roy	DT	LSU	From Colts (Note: The Vikings traded fifth- and sixth-round selections (158th and 211th overall) to the Indianapolis Colts in exchange for a fifth-round selection (141st overall).)
5	158	Traded to the Indianapolis Colts			
5	164	Jaren Hall	QB	BYU	From 49ers
6	201	Traded to the Houston Texans (Note: The Vikings traded a sixth-round selection (201st overall) to the Houston Texans in exchange for a seventh-round selection (219th overall) and DE Ross Blacklock.)			
6	211	Traded to the Indianapolis Colts			Compensatory pick
7	219	Traded to the Philadelphia Eagles (Note: The Vikings traded a seventh-round selection (219th overall) and a conditional 2024 fourth-round selection to the Philadelphia Eagles in exchange for WR Jalen Reagor.)			From Texans
7	222	DeWayne McBride	RB	UAB	From 49ers
7	241	Traded to the Denver Broncos (Note: The Vikings traded a seventh-round selection (241st overall) and DE Stephen Weatherly to the Denver Broncos in exchange for a 2022 seventh-round selection.)			

2023 Minnesota Vikings undrafted free agents
Name	Position	College	Ref.
Junior Aho	OLB	SMU (IPP)	
Alan Ali	C	TCU	
Calvin Avery	DT	Illinois	
Abraham Beauplan	MLB	Marshall	
Andre Carter II	OLB	Army	
Jacky Chen	OT	Pace	
C. J. Coldon	CB	Oklahoma	
Wilson Huber	MLB	Cincinnati	
Cephus Johnson	WR	Southeastern Louisiana	
Malik Knowles	WR	Kansas State	
Garett Maag	WR	North Dakota	
Zach Ojile	FB	Minnesota Duluth	
Ivan Pace Jr.	MLB	Cincinnati	
Jack Podlesny	K	Georgia	
Ben Sims	TE	Baylor	
Thayer Thomas	WR	NC State	
NaJee Thompson	CB	Georgia Southern	
Jaylin Williams	CB	Indiana	

Draft trades

== Staff ==
2023 Minnesota Vikings staff
Front office: Owner/chairman – Zygi Wilf; Owner/president – Mark Wilf; Owner/vice chairman – Leonard Wilf; Chief operating officer – Andrew Miller; General manager – Kwesi Adofo-Mensah; Executive vice president of football operations – Rob Brzezinski; Senior vice president of player personnel – Ryan Grigson; Vice president of football operations – Demitrius Washington; Director of player personnel – Ryan Monnens; Assistant director of player personnel – Chisolm Opara; Senior assistant director of pro personnel – Sam DeLuca; Director of college scouting – Mike Sholiton; Assistant director of college scouting – Pat Roberts; Senior personnel executive – Jamaal Stephenson; Head coaches: Head coach – Kevin O'Connell; Assistant head coach – Mike Pettine; Offensive coaches: Offensive coordinator – Wes Phillips; Quarterbacks – Chris O'Hara; Assistant quarterbacks/chief of special projects – Grant Udinski; Pass game specialist/game management coordinator – Ryan Cordell; Running backs/running game coordinator – Curtis Modkins; Wide receivers – Keenan McCardell; Assistant wide receivers – Tony Sorrentino; Tight ends/passing game coordinator – Brian Angelichio; Offensive line – Chris Kuper; Assistant offensive line – Justin Rascati; Quality control/offense – Derron Montgomery; Offensive assistant – Ben Ellefson	Defensive coaches: Defensive coordinator – Brian Flores; Defensive line – Chris Rumph; Assistant defensive line – Patrick Hill; Outside linebackers/pass rush specialist – Mike Smith; Inside linebackers – Mike Siravo; Assistant inside linebackers – Thad Bogardus; Defensive pass game coordinator – Daronte Jones; Assistant defensive backs – Michael Hutchings; Defensive assistant – Imarjaye Albury; Defensive quality control – Lance Bennett; Special teams coaches: Special teams coordinator – Matt Daniels; Assistant special teams – Dalmin Gibson; Strength and conditioning: Director of player performance – Josh Hingst; Assistant director of player performance – Derik Keyes; Assistant player performance – Marquis Johnson

== Final roster ==
2023 Minnesota Vikings roster
Quarterbacks (QB): 15 Josh Dobbs; 16 Jaren Hall; 12 Nick Mullens; Running backs (RB): 32 Ty Chandler; 30 C. J. Ham FB; 2 Alexander Mattison; 26 Kene Nwangwu; Wide receivers (WR): 3 Jordan Addison; 81 Lucky Jackson; 18 Justin Jefferson; 17 K. J. Osborn; 4 Brandon Powell; Tight ends (TE): 86 Johnny Mundt; 34 Nick Muse; 84 Josh Oliver	Offensive linemen (OL): 78 Hakeem Adeniji T; 56 Garrett Bradbury C; 64 Blake Brandel G; 71 Christian Darrisaw T; 67 Ed Ingram G; 75 Brian O'Neill T; 76 David Quessenberry T; 62 Chris Reed G; 66 Dalton Risner G; 65 Austin Schlottmann C; Defensive linemen (DL): 90 Jonathan Bullard DE; 52 Sheldon Day DE; 97 Harrison Phillips NT; 93 Jaquelin Roy DE; 50 T. J. Smith NT; 95 Khyiris Tonga NT	Linebackers (LB): 33 Brian Asamoah ILB; 54 Anthony Barr ILB; 55 Andre Carter II OLB; 58 Jordan Hicks ILB; 99 Danielle Hunter OLB; 91 Patrick Jones II OLB; 40 Ivan Pace Jr. ILB; 59 Nick Vigil ILB; Defensive backs (DB): 5 Mekhi Blackmon CB; 23 Andrew Booth Jr. CB; 24 Camryn Bynum FS; 6 Lewis Cine FS; 21 Akayleb Evans CB; 25 Theo Jackson FS; 44 Josh Metellus SS; 7 Byron Murphy CB; 22 Harrison Smith SS; 11 NaJee Thompson CB; 20 Jay Ward SS; Special teams (ST): 42 Andrew DePaola LS; 1 Greg Joseph K; 14 Ryan Wright P	Practice squad: 73 Junior Aho NT (IPP); 39 Abraham Beauplan ILB; 41 Austin Bryant OLB; 68 Henry Byrd G; 63 Coy Cronk RT; 82 Troy Fumagalli TE; 37 Myles Gaskin RB; 13 N'Keal Harry WR; 9 Trishton Jackson WR; 27 DeWayne McBride RB; 48 Quincy Roche OLB; 79 Tyrese Robinson G; 89 Thayer Thomas WR; 38 Jaylin Williams CB; 29 Joejuan Williams CB; Reserve: 31 Cam Akers RB (IR); 8 Kirk Cousins QB (IR); 0 Marcus Davenport OLB (IR); 45 Troy Dye ILB (IR); 87 T. J. Hockenson TE (IR); -- Malik Knowles WR (IR); 47 William Kwenkeu ILB (IR); 94 Dean Lowry DE (IR); 92 James Lynch NT (IR); 83 Jalen Nailor WR (IR); 74 Oli Udoh LT (IR); 98 D. J. Wonnum OLB (IR); Rookies in italics 53 active, 12 reserve, 15 practice squad

== Preseason ==
The Vikings' preseason schedule was announced on May 11, 2023, along with the regular season schedule. They first travelled to the Pacific Northwest to play the Seattle Seahawks, before returning to Minnesota for their remaining two games, first against the Tennessee Titans and then the Arizona Cardinals.

=== Schedule ===
Week	Date	Opponent	Result	Record	Venue	Recap
1	August 10	at Seattle Seahawks	L 13–24	0–1	Lumen Field	Recap
2	August 19	Tennessee Titans	L 16–24	0–2	U.S. Bank Stadium	Recap
3	August 26	Arizona Cardinals	L 17–18	0–3	U.S. Bank Stadium	Recap

=== Game summaries ===
==== Week 1: at Seattle Seahawks ====
Week 1: Minnesota Vikings at Seattle Seahawks – Game summary

Quarter	1	2	3	4	Total
Vikings	3	7	3	0	13
Seahawks	0	7	10	7	24

at Lumen Field, Seattle, Washington

- Date: August 10
- Game time: 7:05 p.m. PDT
  9:05 p.m. CDT
- Game weather: Mostly sunny, 71 °F (22 °C)
- Game attendance: 68,179
- Referee: Ronald Torbert (62)
- TV: Fox 9
- Recap, Game Book

Game information

First quarter

- MIN – Greg Joseph 26-yard field goal, 5:20. Vikings 3–0. Drive: 14 plays, 71 yards, 6:47.

Second quarter

- MIN – Nick Muse 4-yard pass from Nick Mullens (Greg Joseph kick), 11:26. Vikings 10–0. Drive: 11 plays, 80 yards, 5:37.
- SEA – Easop Winston 13-yard pass from Drew Lock (Jason Myers kick), 4:16. Vikings 10–7. Drive: 6 plays, 59 yards, 3:20.

Third quarter

- SEA – Jason Myers 35-yard field goal, 11:08. Tied 10–10. Drive: 8 plays, 58 yards, 3:52.
- MIN – Greg Joseph 54-yard field goal, 3:25. Vikings 13–10. Drive: 4 plays, 2 yards, 1:41.
- SEA – Jake Bobo 19-yard pass from Drew Lock (Jason Myers kick), 0:03. Seahawks 17–13. Drive: 5 plays, 32 yards, 2:02.

Fourth quarter

- SEA – Matt Landers 30-yard pass from Holton Ahlers (Jason Myers kick), 7:47. Seahawks 24–13. Drive: 6 plays, 64 yards, 3:08.

Top passers

- MIN – Nick Mullens – 14/20, 139 yards, TD
- SEA – Drew Lock – 17/24, 191 yards, 2 TD, INT

Top rushers

- MIN – Ty Chandler – 11 rushes, 41 yards
- SEA – Bryant Koback – 6 rushes, 32 yards

Top receivers

- MIN – Jalen Reagor – 4 receptions, 55 yards
- SEA – Jake Bobo – 3 receptions, 55 yards, TD

==== Week 2: vs. Tennessee Titans ====
Week 2: Tennessee Titans at Minnesota Vikings – Game summary

Quarter	1	2	3	4	Total
Titans	7	0	10	7	24
Vikings	0	9	0	7	16

at U.S. Bank Stadium, Minneapolis, Minnesota

- Date: August 19
- Game time: 7:00 p.m. CDT
- Game weather: None (indoor stadium)
- Game attendance: 66,689
- Referee: Clay Martin (19)
- TV: Fox 9
- Recap, Game Book

Game information

First quarter

- TEN – Tyjae Spears 33-yard run (Caleb Shudak kick), 1:06. Titans 7–0. Drive: 9 plays, 70 yards, 4:03.

Second quarter

- MIN – Greg Joseph 45-yard field goal, 13:21. Titans 7–3. Drive: 6 plays, 48 yards, 2:45.
- MIN – Greg Joseph 33-yard field goal, 6:50. Titans 7–6. Drive: 10 plays, 45 yards, 3:23.
- MIN – Greg Joseph 26-yard field goal, 0:16. Vikings 9–7. Drive: 7 plays, 46 yards, 1:34.

Third quarter

- TEN – Trey Wolff 24-yard field goal, 9:53. Titans 10–9. Drive: 6 plays, 64 yards, 2:53.
- TEN – Julius Chestnut 5-yard run (Trey Wolff kick), 4:11. Titans 17–9. Drive: 7 plays, 61 yards, 4:01.

Fourth quarter

- TEN – Julius Chestnut 1-yard pass from Malik Willis (Trey Wolff kick), 12:21. Titans 24–9. Drive: 9 plays, 53 yards, 4:45.
- MIN – DeWayne McBride 1-yard run (Greg Joseph kick), 5:50. Titans 24–16. Drive: 12 plays, 83 yards, 6:31.

Top passers

- TEN – Malik Willis – 10/17, 85 yards, TD, INT
- MIN – Nick Mullens – 13/23, 151 yards

Top rushers

- TEN – Julius Chestnut – 13 rushes, 98 yards, TD
- MIN – Ty Chandler – 11 rushes, 24 yards

Top receivers

- TEN – Mason Kinsey – 4 receptions, 37 yards
- MIN – Nick Muse – 3 receptions, 46 yards

==== Week 3: vs Arizona Cardinals ====
Week 3: Arizona Cardinals at Minnesota Vikings – Game summary

Quarter	1	2	3	4	Total
Cardinals	3	0	6	9	18
Vikings	14	3	0	0	17

at U.S. Bank Stadium, Minneapolis, Minnesota

- Date: August 26
- Game time: 12:00 p.m. CDT
- Game weather: None (indoor stadium)
- Game attendance: 66,641
- Referee: Tra Blake (3)
- TV: Fox 9
- Recap, Game Book

Game information

First quarter

- MIN – DeWayne McBride 1-yard run (Greg Joseph kick), 10:26. Vikings 7–0. Drive: 10 plays, 75 yards, 4:34.
- MIN – Abram Smith 5-yard pass from Jaren Hall (Greg Joseph kick), 9:04. Vikings 14–0. Drive: 1 play, 5 yards, 0:05.
- ARI – Matt Prater 38-yard field goal, 5:10. Vikings 14–3. Drive: 9 plays, 59 yards, 3:54.

Second quarter

- MIN – Greg Joseph 26-yard field goal, 0:20. Vikings 17–3. Drive: 10 plays, 75 yards, 2:13.

Third quarter

- ARI – Davion Davis 26-yard pass from David Blough (kick failed, hit left upright), 7:54. Vikings 17–9. Drive: 12 plays, 75 yards, 7:06.

Fourth quarter

- ARI – David Blough 5-yard run (pass failed), 10:50. Vikings 17–15. Drive: 7 plays, 66 yards, 3:24.
- ARI – Matt Prater 27-yard field goal, 6:20. Cardinals 18–17. Drive: 7 plays, 23 yards, 3:05.

Top passers

- ARI – David Blough – 11/22, 93 yards, TD
- MIN – Jaren Hall – 16/27, 178 yards, TD, INT

Top rushers

- ARI – Corey Clement – 14 rushes, 79 yards
- MIN – DeWayne McBride – 8 rushes, 37 yards, TD

Top receivers

- ARI – Davion Davis – 3 receptions, 43 yards, TD
- MIN – Blake Proehl – 5 receptions, 45 yards

== Regular season ==
=== Schedule ===
Week	Date	Opponent	Result	Record	Venue	Recap
1	September 10	Tampa Bay Buccaneers	**L** 17–20	0–1	U.S. Bank Stadium	Recap
2	September 14	at Philadelphia Eagles	**L** 28–34	0–2	Lincoln Financial Field	Recap
3	September 24	Los Angeles Chargers	**L** 24–28	0–3	U.S. Bank Stadium	Recap
4	October 1	at Carolina Panthers	**W** 21–13	1–3	Bank of America Stadium	Recap
5	October 8	Kansas City Chiefs	**L** 20–27	1–4	U.S. Bank Stadium	Recap
6	October 15	at **Chicago Bears**	**W** 19–13	2–4	Soldier Field	Recap
7	October 23	San Francisco 49ers	**W** 22–17	3–4	U.S. Bank Stadium	Recap
8	October 29	at **Green Bay Packers**	**W** 24–10	4–4	Lambeau Field	Recap
9	November 5	at Atlanta Falcons	**W** 31–28	5–4	Mercedes-Benz Stadium	Recap
10	November 12	New Orleans Saints	**W** 27–19	6–4	U.S. Bank Stadium	Recap
11	November 19	at Denver Broncos	**L** 20–21	6–5	Empower Field at Mile High	Recap
12	November 27	**Chicago Bears**	**L** 10–12	6–6	U.S. Bank Stadium	Recap
13	Bye					
14	December 10	at Las Vegas Raiders	**W** 3–0	7–6	Allegiant Stadium	Recap
15	December 16	at Cincinnati Bengals	**L** 24–27 (OT)	7–7	Paycor Stadium	Recap
16	December 24	**Detroit Lions**	**L** 24–30	7–8	U.S. Bank Stadium	Recap
17	December 31	**Green Bay Packers**	**L** 10–33	7–9	U.S. Bank Stadium	Recap
18	January 7	at **Detroit Lions**	**L** 20–30	7–10	Ford Field	Recap

Note: Intra-division opponents are in bold text.

=== Game summaries ===
==== Week 1: vs. Tampa Bay Buccaneers ====
Week 1: Tampa Bay Buccaneers at Minnesota Vikings – Game summary

Quarter	1	2	3	4	Total
**Buccaneers**	3	7	7	3	**20**
Vikings	0	10	0	7	**17**

at U.S. Bank Stadium, Minneapolis, Minnesota

- Date: September 10
- Game time: 12:00 p.m. CDT
- Game weather: None (indoor stadium)
- Game attendance: 66,741
- Referee: Scott Novak (1)
- TV announcers (CBS): Andrew Catalon, Tiki Barber, Matt Ryan and AJ Ross
- Recap, Game Book

Game information

**First quarter**

- TB – Chase McLaughlin 36-yard field goal, 3:23. Buccaneers 3–0. **Drive: 4 plays, 0 yards, 1:35.**

**Second quarter**

- MIN – Jordan Addison 39-yard pass from Kirk Cousins (Greg Joseph kick), 11:15. Vikings 7–3. **Drive: 6 plays, 83 yards, 2:53.**
- MIN – Greg Joseph 25-yard field goal, 5:41. Vikings 10–3. **Drive: 9 plays, 62 yards, 3:43.**
- TB – Mike Evans 28-yard pass from Baker Mayfield (Chase McLaughlin kick), 1:09. Tied 10–10 **Drive: 7 plays, 61 yards, 1:30.**

**Third quarter**

- TB – Trey Palmer 7-yard pass from Baker Mayfield (Chase McLaughlin kick), 6:01. Buccaneers 17–10 **Drive: 16 plays, 75 yards, 8:59.**

**Fourth quarter**

- MIN – Alexander Mattison 4-yard pass from Kirk Cousins (Greg Joseph kick), 13:37. Tied 17–17. **Drive: 16 plays, 75 yards, 7:24.**
- TB – Chase McLaughlin 57-yard field goal, 5:10. Buccaneers 20–17. **Drive: 10 plays, 38 yards, 4:46.**

**Top passers**

- TB – Baker Mayfield – 21/34, 173 yards, 2 TD
- MIN – Kirk Cousins – 33/44, 344 yards, 2 TD, INT

**Top rushers**

- TB – Rachaad White – 17 rushes, 39 yards
- MIN – Alexander Mattison – 11 rushes, 34 yards

**Top receivers**

- TB – Mike Evans – 6 receptions, 66 yards, TD
- MIN – Justin Jefferson – 9 receptions, 150 yards

==== Week 2: at Philadelphia Eagles ====
Week 2: Minnesota Vikings at Philadelphia Eagles – Game summary

Quarter	1	2	3	4	Total
Vikings	0	7	7	14	**28**
**Eagles**	3	10	14	7	**34**

at Lincoln Financial Field, Philadelphia, Pennsylvania

- Date: September 14
- Game time: 8:15 p.m. EDT/7:15 p.m. CDT
- Game weather: Clear, 72 °F (22 °C)
- Game attendance: 69,879
- Referee: Clay Martin (19)
- TV announcers (KMSP/Prime Video): Al Michaels, Kirk Herbstreit and Kaylee Hartung
- Recap, Game Book

Game information

**First quarter**

- PHI – Jake Elliott 24-yard field goal, 9:48. Eagles 3–0. **Drive: 9 plays, 69 yards, 5:12.**

**Second quarter**

- MIN – T. J. Hockenson 5-yard pass from Kirk Cousins (Greg Joseph kick), 10:39. Vikings 7–3. **Drive: 9 plays, 55 yards, 5:03.**
- PHI – Jalen Hurts 1-yard run (Jake Elliott kick), 2:44. Eagles 10–7. **Drive: 16 plays, 75 yards, 7:55.**
- PHI – Jake Elliott 61-yard field goal, 0:00. Eagles 13–7. **Drive: 6 plays, 37 yards, 0:34.**

**Third quarter**

- PHI – Jalen Hurts 1-yard run (Jake Elliott kick), 13:53. Eagles 20–7. **Drive: 2 plays, 7 yards, 0:33.**
- PHI – DeVonta Smith 63-yard pass from Jalen Hurts (Jake Elliott kick), 10:54. Eagles 27–7. **Drive: 3 plays, 69 yards, 1:35.**
- MIN – Jordan Addison 62-yard pass from Kirk Cousins (Greg Joseph kick), 9:09. Eagles 27–14. **Drive: 5 plays, 75 yards, 1:45.**

**Fourth quarter**

- MIN – K. J. Osborn 10-yard pass from Kirk Cousins (Greg Joseph kick), 7:41. Eagles 27–21. **Drive: 9 plays, 86 yards, 3:38.**
- PHI – D'Andre Swift 2-yard run (Jake Elliott kick), 4:13. Eagles 34–21. **Drive: 8 plays, 75 yards, 3:28.**
- MIN – T. J. Hockenson 5-yard pass from Kirk Cousins (Greg Joseph kick), 1:10. Eagles 34–28. **Drive: 10 plays, 75 yards, 3:03.**

**Top passers**

- MIN – Kirk Cousins – 31/44, 364 yards, 4 TD
- PHI – Jalen Hurts – 18/23, 193 yards, TD, INT

**Top rushers**

- MIN – Alexander Mattison – 8 rushes, 28 yards
- PHI – D'Andre Swift – 28 rushes, 175 yards, TD

**Top receivers**

- MIN – Justin Jefferson – 11 receptions, 159 yards
- PHI – Dallas Goedert – 6 receptions, 22 yards

==== Week 3: vs. Los Angeles Chargers ====
Week 3: Los Angeles Chargers at Minnesota Vikings – Game summary

Quarter	1	2	3	4	Total
**Chargers**	7	7	7	7	**28**
Vikings	0	10	7	7	**24**

at U.S. Bank Stadium, Minneapolis, Minnesota

- Date: September 24
- Game time: 12:00 p.m. CDT
- Game weather: None (indoor stadium)
- Game attendance: 66,878
- Referee: Shawn Smith (14)
- TV announcers (Fox): Kevin Kugler, Mark Sanchez and Laura Okmin
- Recap, Game Book

Game information

**First quarter**

- LAC – Donald Parham 3-yard pass from Justin Herbert (Cameron Dicker kick), 2:51. Chargers 7–0. **Drive: 12 plays, 79 yards, 5:41.**

**Second quarter**

- MIN – Josh Oliver 4-yard pass from Kirk Cousins (Greg Joseph kick), 7:27. Tied 7–7. **Drive: 5 plays, 75 yards, 2:46.**
- MIN – Greg Joseph 23-yard field goal, 2:08. Vikings 10–7. **Drive: 11 plays, 40 yards, 3:54.**
- LAC – Donald Parham 1-yard pass from Justin Herbert (Cameron Dicker kick), 0:47. Chargers 14–10. **Drive: 10 plays, 75 yards, 1:21.**

**Third quarter**

- LAC – Mike Williams 49-yard pass from Keenan Allen (Cameron Dicker kick), 5:53. Chargers 21–10. **Drive: 3 plays, 80 yards, 1:11.**
- MIN – K. J. Osborn 36-yard pass from Kirk Cousins (Greg Joseph kick), 3:01. Chargers 21–17. **Drive: 8 plays, 75 yards, 2:52.**

**Fourth quarter**

- MIN – Justin Jefferson 52-yard pass from Kirk Cousins (Greg Joseph kick), 11:20. Vikings 24–21. **Drive: 8 plays, 83 yards, 3:47.**
- LAC – Josh Palmer 30-yard pass from Justin Herbert (Cameron Dicker kick), 8:05. Chargers 28–24. **Drive: 7 plays, 75 yards, 3:15.**

**Top passers**

- LAC – Justin Herbert – 40/47, 405 yards, 3 TD
- MIN – Kirk Cousins – 32/50, 367 yards, 3 TD, INT

**Top rushers**

- LAC – Joshua Kelley – 11 rushes, 12 yards
- MIN – Alexander Mattison – 20 rushes, 93 yards

**Top receivers**

- LAC – Keenan Allen – 18 receptions, 215 yards
- MIN – Justin Jefferson – 7 receptions, 149 yards, TD

==== Week 4: at Carolina Panthers ====
Week 4: Minnesota Vikings at Carolina Panthers – Game summary

Quarter	1	2	3	4	Total
**Vikings**	0	7	14	0	**21**
Panthers	7	6	0	0	**13**

at Bank of America Stadium, Charlotte, North Carolina

- Date: October 1
- Game time: 1:00 p.m. EDT/12:00 p.m. CDT
- Game weather: Sunny, 80 °F (27 °C)
- Game attendance: 72,842
- Referee: Tra Blake (3)
- TV announcers (Fox): Alex Faust, Brady Quinn and Megan Olivi
- Recap, Game Book

Game information

**First quarter**

- CAR – Sam Franklin 99-yard interception return (Eddy Piñeiro kick), 10:27. Panthers 7–0.

**Second quarter**

- CAR – Eddy Piñeiro 26-yard field goal, 14:56. Panthers 10–0. **Drive: 15 plays, 61 yards, 8:26.**
- MIN – Justin Jefferson 4-yard pass from Kirk Cousins (Greg Joseph kick), 9:43. Panthers 10–7. **Drive: 10 plays, 64 yards, 5:13.**
- CAR – Eddy Piñeiro 56-yard field goal, 0:00. Panthers 13–7. **Drive: 4 plays, 18 yards, 0:34.**

**Third quarter**

- MIN – D. J. Wonnum 51-yard fumble return (Greg Joseph kick), 3:58. Vikings 14–13.
- MIN – Justin Jefferson 30-yard pass from Kirk Cousins (Greg Joseph kick), 0:00. Vikings 21–13. **Drive: 4 plays, 56 yards, 1:44.**

**Fourth quarter**

- No scoring plays.

**Top passers**

- MIN – Kirk Cousins – 12/19, 139 yards, 2 TD, 2 INT
- CAR – Bryce Young – 25/32, 204 yards

**Top rushers**

- MIN – Alexander Mattison – 17 rushes, 95 yards
- CAR – Chuba Hubbard – 14 rushes, 41 yards

**Top receivers**

- MIN – Justin Jefferson – 6 receptions, 85 yards, 2 TD
- CAR – Adam Thielen – 7 receptions, 76 yards

==== Week 5: vs. Kansas City Chiefs ====
Week 5: Kansas City Chiefs at Minnesota Vikings – Game summary

Quarter	1	2	3	4	Total
**Chiefs**	7	6	14	0	**27**
Vikings	3	10	0	7	**20**

at U.S. Bank Stadium, Minneapolis, Minnesota

- Date: October 8
- Game time: 3:25 p.m. CDT
- Game weather: None (indoor stadium)
- Game attendance: 67,003
- Referee: Land Clark (130)
- TV announcers (CBS): Jim Nantz, Tony Romo and Tracy Wolfson
- Recap, Game Book

Game information

**First quarter**

- KC – Isiah Pacheco 1-yard run (Harrison Butker kick), 10:00. Chiefs 7–0. **Drive: 9 plays, 45 yards, 4:50.**
- MIN – Greg Joseph 40-yard field goal, 4:02. Chiefs 7–3. **Drive: 14 plays, 53 yards, 5:58.**

**Second quarter**

- KC – Harrison Butker 38-yard field goal, 12:46. Chiefs 10–3. **Drive: 12 plays, 55 yards, 6:16.**
- MIN – Greg Joseph 29-yard field goal, 8:02. Chiefs 10–6. **Drive: 9 plays, 64 yards, 4:44.**
- MIN – Jordan Addison 6-yard pass from Kirk Cousins (Greg Joseph kick), 1:39. Vikings 13–10. **Drive: 12 plays, 56 yards, 5:24.**
- KC – Harrison Butker 40-yard field goal, 0:00. Tied 13–13. **Drive: 10 plays, 53 yards, 1:39.**

**Third quarter**

- KC – Rashee Rice 8-yard pass from Patrick Mahomes (Harrison Butker kick), 10:10. Chiefs 20–13. **Drive: 11 plays, 75 yards, 4:50.**
- KC – Travis Kelce 4-yard pass from Patrick Mahomes (Harrison Butker kick), 2:45. Chiefs 27–13. **Drive: 11 plays, 74 yards, 6:27.**

**Fourth quarter**

- MIN – Alexander Mattison 9-yard pass from Kirk Cousins (Greg Joseph kick), 12:11. Chiefs 27–20. **Drive: 14 plays, 75 yards, 5:34.**

**Top passers**

- KC – Patrick Mahomes – 31/41, 281 yards, 2 TD
- MIN – Kirk Cousins – 29/47, 284 yards, 2 TD

**Top rushers**

- KC – Isiah Pacheco – 16 rushes, 56 yards, TD
- MIN – Alexander Mattison – 8 rushes, 26 yards

**Top receivers**

- KC – Travis Kelce – 10 receptions, 67 yards, TD
- MIN – Jordan Addison – 6 receptions, 64 yards, TD

==== Week 6: at Chicago Bears ====
Week 6: Minnesota Vikings at Chicago Bears – Game summary

Quarter	1	2	3	4	Total
**Vikings**	3	9	7	0	**19**
Bears	0	6	0	7	**13**

at Soldier Field, Chicago, Illinois

- Date: October 15
- Game time: 12:00 p.m. CDT
- Game weather: Partly cloudy, 53 °F (12 °C)
- Game attendance: 62,167
- Referee: Brad Allen (122)
- TV announcers (Fox): Brandon Gaudin, Robert Smith and Jen Hale
- Recap, Game Book

Game information

**First quarter**

- MIN – Greg Joseph 53-yard field goal, 6:24. Vikings 3–0. **Drive: 9 plays, 33 yards, 4:47.**

**Second quarter**

- CHI – Cairo Santos 22-yard field goal, 13:41. Tied 3–3. **Drive: 14 plays, 71 yards, 7:43.**
- MIN – Greg Joseph 51-yard field goal, 8:56. Vikings 6–3. **Drive: 9 plays, 42 yards, 4:45.**
- CHI – Cairo Santos 53-yard field goal, 3:18. Tied 6–6. **Drive: 5 plays, 45 yards, 2:48.**
- MIN – Jordan Addison 10-yard pass from Kirk Cousins (kick blocked), 0:12. Vikings 12–6. **Drive: 8 plays, 77 yards, 1:35.**

**Third quarter**

- MIN – Jordan Hicks 42-yard fumble return (Greg Joseph kick), 6:44. Vikings 19–6.

**Fourth quarter**

- CHI – Tyson Bagent 1-yard run (Cairo Santos kick), 7:46. Vikings 19–13. **Drive: 9 plays, 77 yards, 4:56.**

**Top passers**

- MIN – Kirk Cousins – 21/31, 181 yards, TD
- CHI – Tyson Bagent – 10/14, 83 yards, INT

**Top rushers**

- MIN – Alexander Mattison – 18 rushes, 44 yards
- CHI – D'Onta Foreman – 15 rushes, 65 yards

**Top receivers**

- MIN – T. J. Hockenson – 6 receptions, 50 yards
- CHI – D. J. Moore – 5 receptions, 51 yards

==== Week 7: vs. San Francisco 49ers ====
Week 7: San Francisco 49ers at Minnesota Vikings – Game summary

Quarter	1	2	3	4	Total
49ers	0	7	7	3	**17**
**Vikings**	7	9	6	0	**22**

at U.S. Bank Stadium, Minneapolis, Minnesota

- Date: October 23
- Game time: 7:15 p.m. CDT
- Game weather: None (indoor stadium)
- Game attendance: 66,975
- Referee: Carl Cheffers (51)
- TV announcers (ESPN/ABC): Joe Buck, Troy Aikman and Lisa Salters
- Recap, Game Book

Game information

**First quarter**

- MIN – Jordan Addison 20-yard pass from Kirk Cousins (Greg Joseph kick), 4:48. Vikings 7–0. **Drive: 10 plays, 89 yards, 6:06.**

**Second quarter**

- MIN – Greg Joseph 21-yard field goal, 7:33. Vikings 10–0. **Drive: 13 plays, 67 yards, 7:20.**
- SF – Christian McCaffrey 3-yard run (Jake Moody kick), 1:01. Vikings 10–7. **Drive: 12 plays, 75 yards, 6:32.**
- MIN – Jordan Addison 60-yard pass from Kirk Cousins (kick failed, wide right), 0:07. Vikings 16–7. **Drive: 5 plays, 75 yards, 0:54.**

**Third quarter**

- MIN – Greg Joseph 20-yard field goal, 6:59. Vikings 19–7. **Drive: 11 plays, 77 yards, 4:46.**
- SF – Christian McCaffrey 35-yard pass from Brock Purdy (Jake Moody kick), 5:54. Vikings 19–14. **Drive: 3 plays, 75 yards, 1:05.**
- MIN – Greg Joseph 54-yard field goal, 0:20. Vikings 22–14. **Drive: 10 plays, 50 yards, 5:34.**

**Fourth quarter**

- SF – Jake Moody 55-yard field goal, 13:21. Vikings 22–17. **Drive: 6 plays, 31 yards, 1:59.**

**Top passers**

- SF – Brock Purdy – 21/30, 272 yards, TD, 2 INT
- MIN – Kirk Cousins – 35/45, 378 yards, 2 TD, INT

**Top rushers**

- SF – Christian McCaffrey – 15 rushes, 45 yards, TD
- MIN – Alexander Mattison – 8 rushes, 39 yards

**Top receivers**

- SF – George Kittle – 5 receptions, 78 yards
- MIN – Jordan Addison – 7 receptions, 124 yards, 2 TD

==== Week 8: at Green Bay Packers ====
Week 8: Minnesota Vikings at Green Bay Packers – Game summary

Quarter	1	2	3	4	Total
**Vikings**	7	3	14	0	**24**
Packers	0	3	7	0	**10**

at Lambeau Field, Green Bay, Wisconsin

- Date: October 29
- Game time: 12:00 p.m. CDT
- Game weather: Cloudy, 39 °F (4 °C)
- Game attendance: 78,113
- Referee: Shawn Hochuli (83)
- TV announcers (Fox): Kenny Albert, Jonathan Vilma and Shannon Spake
- Recap, Game Book

Game information

**First quarter**

- MIN – Cam Akers 6-yard run (Greg Joseph kick), 1:34. Vikings 7–0. **Drive: 7 plays, 77 yards, 4:33.**

**Second quarter**

- MIN – Greg Joseph 25-yard field goal, 10:13. Vikings 10–0. **Drive: 9 plays, 73 yards, 4:40.**
- GB – Anders Carlson 30-yard field goal, 0:00. Vikings 10–3. **Drive: 14 plays, 73 yards, 4:56.**

**Third quarter**

- MIN – T. J. Hockenson 2-yard pass from Kirk Cousins (Greg Joseph kick), 9:25. Vikings 17–3. **Drive: 13 plays, 75 yards, 5:35.**
- MIN – Jordan Addison 20-yard pass from Kirk Cousins (Greg Joseph kick), 7:48. Vikings 24–3. **Drive: 1 play, 20 yards, 0:05.**
- GB – Romeo Doubs 1-yard pass from Jordan Love (Anders Carlson kick), 2:39. Vikings 24–10. **Drive: 14 plays, 81 yards, 5:09.**

**Fourth quarter**

- No scoring plays.

**Top passers**

- MIN – Kirk Cousins – 23/31, 274 yards, 2 TD
- GB – Jordan Love – 24/41, 229 yards, TD, INT

**Top rushers**

- MIN – Alexander Mattison – 16 rushes, 31 yards
- GB – Jordan Love – 4 rushes, 34 yards

**Top receivers**

- MIN – K. J. Osborn – 8 receptions, 99 yards
- GB – Jayden Reed – 4 receptions, 83 yards

==== Week 9: at Atlanta Falcons ====
Week 9: Minnesota Vikings at Atlanta Falcons – Game summary

Quarter	1	2	3	4	Total
**Vikings**	3	7	11	10	**31**
Falcons	3	8	10	7	**28**

at Mercedes-Benz Stadium, Atlanta, Georgia

- Date: November 5
- Game time: 1:00 p.m. EST/12:00 p.m. CST
- Game weather: Clear, 70 °F (21 °C) (retractable roof open)
- Game attendance: 69,715
- Referee: Shawn Smith (14)
- TV announcers (Fox): Chris Myers, Mark Schlereth and Kristina Pink
- Recap, Game Book

Game information

**First quarter**

- ATL – Younghoe Koo 52-yard field goal, 7:06. Falcons 3–0. **Drive: 5 plays, 34 yards, 1:53.**
- MIN – Greg Joseph 19-yard field goal, 2:20. Tied 3–3. **Drive: 9 plays, 74 yards, 4:46.**

**Second quarter**

- ATL – Joshua Dobbs sacked in the end zone by Calais Campbell for a safety, 14:04. Falcons 5–3.
- ATL – Younghoe Koo 43-yard field goal, 8:57. Falcons 8–3. **Drive: 10 plays, 38 yards, 5:07.**
- ATL – Younghoe Koo 23-yard field goal, 5:32. Falcons 11–3. **Drive: 4 plays, −4 yards, 2:01.**
- MIN – Alexander Mattison 2-yard pass from Joshua Dobbs (Greg Joseph kick), 0:55. Falcons 11–10. **Drive: 13 plays, 75 yards, 4:37.**

**Third quarter**

- ATL – Younghoe Koo 54-yard field goal, 12:15. Falcons 14–10. **Drive: 4 plays, −6 yards, 1:32.**
- MIN – Greg Joseph 32-yard field goal, 8:13. Falcons 14–13. **Drive: 8 plays, 61 yards, 4:02.**
- ATL – Jonnu Smith 60-yard pass from Taylor Heinicke (Younghoe Koo kick), 6:54. Falcons 21–13. **Drive: 4 plays, 75 yards, 1:19.**
- MIN – Joshua Dobbs 18-yard run (Joshua Dobbs–Trishton Jackson pass), 2:20. Tied 21–21. **Drive: 6 plays, 40 yards, 2:34.**

**Fourth quarter**

- MIN – Greg Joseph 31-yard field goal, 14:18. Vikings 24–21. **Drive: 5 plays, 11 yards, 2:54.**
- ATL – Tyler Allgeier 5-yard run (Younghoe Koo kick), 2:08. Falcons 28–24. **Drive: 13 plays, 79 yards, 6:58.**
- MIN – Brandon Powell 6-yard pass from Joshua Dobbs (Greg Joseph kick), 0:22. Vikings 31–28. **Drive: 11 plays, 75 yards, 1:46.**

**Top passers**

- MIN – Joshua Dobbs – 20/30, 158 yards, 2 TD
- ATL – Taylor Heinicke – 21/38, 268 yards, TD, INT

**Top rushers**

- MIN – Joshua Dobbs – 7 rushes, 66 yards, TD
- ATL – Bijan Robinson – 11 rushes, 51 yards

**Top receivers**

- MIN – T. J. Hockenson – 7 receptions, 69 yards
- ATL – Jonnu Smith – 5 receptions, 100 yards, TD

==== Week 10: vs. New Orleans Saints ====
Week 10: New Orleans Saints at Minnesota Vikings – Game summary

Quarter	1	2	3	4	Total
Saints	3	0	8	8	**19**
**Vikings**	3	21	3	0	**27**

at U.S. Bank Stadium, Minneapolis, Minnesota

- Date: November 12
- Game time: 12:00 p.m. CST
- Game weather: None (indoor stadium)
- Game attendance: 66,933
- Referee: Adrian Hill (29)
- TV announcers (Fox): Adam Amin, Mark Schlereth and Kristina Pink
- Recap, Game Book

Game information

**First quarter**

- MIN – Greg Joseph 40-yard field goal, 10:47. Vikings 3–0. **Drive: 8 plays, 53 yards, 4:13.**
- NO – Blake Grupe 48-yard field goal, 1:19. Tied 3–3. **Drive: 10 plays, 46 yards, 4:58.**

**Second quarter**

- MIN – Ty Chandler 2-yard run (Greg Joseph kick), 10:14. Vikings 10–3. **Drive: 11 plays, 75 yards, 6:05.**
- MIN – Josh Dobbs 7-yard run (Greg Joseph kick), 3:30. Vikings 17–3. **Drive: 9 plays, 82 yards, 4:41.**
- MIN – T. J. Hockenson 28-yard pass from Josh Dobbs (Greg Joseph kick), 0:16. Vikings 24–3. **Drive: 7 plays, 76 yards, 1:31.**

**Third quarter**

- MIN – Greg Joseph 33-yard field goal, 10:09. Vikings 27–3. **Drive: 7 plays, 49 yards, 2:47.**
- NO – Chris Olave 14-yard pass from Jameis Winston (Alvin Kamara run), 5:26. Vikings 27–11. **Drive: 10 plays, 75 yards, 4:43.**

**Fourth quarter**

- NO – A. T. Perry 15-yard pass from Jameis Winston (Alvin Kamara run), 11:40. Vikings 27–19. **Drive: 9 plays, 56 yards, 3:15.**

**Top passers**

- NO – Jameis Winston – 13/25, 122 yards, 2 TD, 2 INT
- MIN – Josh Dobbs – 23/34, 268 yards, TD

**Top rushers**

- NO – Alvin Kamara – 9 rushes, 42 yards
- MIN – Ty Chandler – 15 rushes, 45 yards, TD

**Top receivers**

- NO – Chris Olave – 6 receptions, 94 yards, TD
- MIN – T. J. Hockenson – 11 receptions, 134 yards, TD

==== Week 11: at Denver Broncos ====
Week 11: Minnesota Vikings at Denver Broncos – Game summary

Quarter	1	2	3	4	Total
Vikings	0	10	7	3	**20**
**Broncos**	3	6	0	12	**21**

at Empower Field at Mile High, Denver, Colorado

- Date: November 19
- Game time: 7:20 p.m. CST/6:20 p.m. MST
- Game weather: Cloudy, 53 °F (12 °C)
- Game attendance: 76,848
- Referee: Ronald Torbert (62)
- TV announcers (NBC): Mike Tirico, Cris Collinsworth and Melissa Stark
- Recap, Game Book

Game information

**First quarter**

- DEN – Wil Lutz 31-yard field goal, 10:28. Broncos 3–0. **Drive: 6 plays, 17 yards, 3:02.**

**Second quarter**

- MIN – Josh Oliver 3-yard pass from Joshua Dobbs (Greg Joseph kick), 14:53. Vikings 7–3. **Drive: 10 plays, 65 yards, 5:08.**
- MIN – Greg Joseph 34-yard field goal, 8:09. Vikings 10–3. **Drive: 9 plays, 55 yards, 5:08.**
- DEN – Wil Lutz 31-yard field goal, 4:08. Vikings 10–6. **Drive: 7 plays, 63 yards, 4:01.**
- DEN – Wil Lutz 52-yard field goal, 0:00. Vikings 10–9. **Drive: 7 plays, 46 yards, 1:11.**

**Third quarter**

- MIN – Joshua Dobbs 10-yard run (Greg Joseph kick), 7:55. Vikings 17–9. **Drive: 9 plays, 69 yards, 4:38.**

**Fourth quarter**

- DEN – Wil Lutz 37-yard field goal, 12:40. Vikings 17–12. **Drive: 9 plays, 47 yards, 5:08.**
- DEN – Wil Lutz 28-yard field goal, 10:37. Vikings 17–15. **Drive: 4 plays, 1 yard, 1:53.**
- MIN – Greg Joseph 30-yard field goal, 3:17. Vikings 20–15. **Drive: 14 plays, 63 yards, 7:20.**
- DEN – Courtland Sutton 15-yard pass from Russell Wilson (run failed), 1:03. Broncos 21–20. **Drive: 10 plays, 75 yards, 2:14.**

**Top passers**

- MIN – Joshua Dobbs – 20/32, 221 yards, TD, INT
- DEN – Russell Wilson – 27/35, 259 yards, TD

**Top rushers**

- MIN – Alexander Mattison – 18 rushes, 81 yards
- DEN – Javonte Williams – 11 rushes, 37 yards

**Top receivers**

- MIN – T. J. Hockenson – 4 receptions, 55 yards
- DEN – Samaje Perine – 7 receptions, 60 yards

==== Week 12: vs. Chicago Bears ====
Week 12: Chicago Bears at Minnesota Vikings – Game summary

Quarter	1	2	3	4	Total
**Bears**	3	0	3	6	**12**
Vikings	0	3	0	7	**10**

at U.S. Bank Stadium, Minneapolis, Minnesota

- Date: November 27
- Game time: 7:15 p.m. CST
- Game weather: None (indoor stadium)
- Game attendance: 66,843
- Referee: Alex Kemp (55)
- TV announcers (ESPN/ABC): Joe Buck, Troy Aikman and Lisa Salters
- Recap, Game Book

Game information

**First quarter**

- No scoring plays.

**Second quarter**

- CHI – Cairo Santos 25-yard field goal, 13:35. Bears 3–0. **Drive: 10 plays, 67 yards, 5:39.**
- MIN – Greg Joseph 34-yard field goal, 0:00. Tied 3–3. **Drive: 7 plays, 64 yards, 1:51.**

**Third quarter**

- CHI – Cairo Santos 39-yard field goal, 6:59. Bears 6–3. **Drive: 10 plays, 34 yards, 5:08.**

**Fourth quarter**

- CHI – Cairo Santos 55-yard field goal, 14:15. Bears 9–3. **Drive: 8 plays, 32 yards, 3:24.**
- MIN – T. J. Hockenson 17-yard pass from Joshua Dobbs (Greg Joseph kick), 5:54. Vikings 10–9. **Drive: 8 plays, 77 yards, 3:52.**
- CHI – Cairo Santos 30-yard field goal, 0:10. Bears 12–10. **Drive: 10 plays, 66 yards, 2:19.**

**Top passers**

- CHI – Justin Fields – 27/37, 217 yards
- MIN – Joshua Dobbs – 22/32, 185 yards, TD, 4 INT

**Top rushers**

- CHI – Justin Fields – 12 rushes, 59 yards
- MIN – Alexander Mattison – 10 rushes, 52 yards

**Top receivers**

- CHI – D. J. Moore – 11 receptions, 114 yards
- MIN – Jordan Addison – 6 receptions, 39 yards

==== Week 14: at Las Vegas Raiders ====
Week 14: Minnesota Vikings at Las Vegas Raiders – Game summary

Quarter	1	2	3	4	Total
**Vikings**	0	0	0	3	**3**
Raiders	0	0	0	0	**0**

at Allegiant Stadium, Paradise, Nevada

- Date: December 10
- Game time: 3:05 p.m. CST/1:05 p.m. PST
- Game weather: None (indoor stadium)
- Game attendance: 62,626
- Referee: Craig Wrolstad (4)
- TV announcers (Fox): Kevin Kugler, Mark Sanchez and Laura Okmin
- Recap, Game Book

Game information

**First quarter**

- No scoring plays.

**Second quarter**

- No scoring plays.

**Third quarter**

- No scoring plays.

**Fourth quarter**

- MIN – Greg Joseph 36-yard field goal, 1:57. Vikings 3–0. **Drive: 13 plays, 56 yards, 3:22.**

**Top passers**

- MIN – Nick Mullens – 9/13, 83 yards
- LV – Aidan O'Connell – 21/32, 171 yards, INT

**Top rushers**

- MIN – Alexander Mattison – 10 rushes, 66 yards
- LV – Josh Jacobs – 13 rushes, 34 yards

**Top receivers**

- MIN – T. J. Hockenson – 5 receptions, 53 yards
- LV – Davante Adams – 7 receptions, 53 yards

The Vikings scored the only points of the game after both teams went over 58 minutes without scoring, in the lowest scoring NFL game since 2007. The Vikings improved to 7–6 and remained in the playoff race.

==== Week 15: at Cincinnati Bengals ====
Week 15: Minnesota Vikings at Cincinnati Bengals – Game summary

Quarter	1	2	3	4	OT	Total
Vikings	7	0	10	7	0	**24**
**Bengals**	3	0	0	21	3	**27**

at Paycor Stadium, Cincinnati, Ohio

- Date: December 16
- Game time: 1:00 p.m. EST/12:00 p.m. CST
- Game weather: Mostly cloudy, 53 °F (12 °C)
- Game attendance: 66,376
- Referee: Bill Vinovich (52)
- TV announcers (WCCO/NFLN): Chris Rose, Jason McCourty and Steve Wyche
- Recap, Game Book

Game information

**First quarter**

- CIN – Evan McPherson 34-yard field goal, 8:41. Bengals 3–0. **Drive: 11 plays, 59 yards, 6:19.**
- MIN – Ty Chandler 1-yard run (Greg Joseph kick), 2:23. Vikings 7–3. **Drive: 12 plays, 75 yards, 6:18.**

**Second quarter**

- No scoring plays.

**Third quarter**

- MIN – Jordan Addison 37-yard pass from Nick Mullens (Greg Joseph kick), 10:46. Vikings 14–3. **Drive: 8 plays, 92 yards, 4:14.**
- MIN – Greg Joseph 39-yard field goal, 4:32. Vikings 17–3. **Drive: 8 plays, 36 yards, 4:36.**

**Fourth quarter**

- CIN – Tee Higgins 13-yard pass from Jake Browning (Evan McPherson kick), 14:56. Vikings 17–10. **Drive: 8 plays, 75 yards, 4:36.**
- CIN – Joe Mixon 1-yard run (Evan McPherson kick), 7:46. Tied 17–17. **Drive: 11 plays, 63 yards, 5:36.**
- MIN – Jordan Addison 1-yard pass from Nick Mullens (Greg Joseph kick), 3:48. Vikings 24–17. **Drive: 7 plays, 75 yards, 3:58.**
- CIN – Tee Higgins 21-yard pass from Jake Browning (Evan McPherson kick), 0:39. Tied 24–24. **Drive: 10 plays, 75 yards, 3:09.**

**Overtime**

- CIN – Evan McPherson 29-yard field goal, 3:11. Bengals 27–24. **Drive: 6 plays, 47 yards, 3:01.**

**Top passers**

- MIN – Nick Mullens – 26/33, 303 yards, 2 TD, 2 INT
- CIN – Jake Browning – 29/42, 324 yards, 2 TD, INT

**Top rushers**

- MIN – Ty Chandler – 23 rushes, 132 yards, TD
- CIN – Joe Mixon – 10 rushes, 47 yards, TD

**Top receivers**

- MIN – Jordan Addison – 6 receptions, 111 yards, 2 TD
- CIN – Ja'Marr Chase – 4 receptions, 64 yards

==== Week 16: vs. Detroit Lions ====
Week 16: Detroit Lions at Minnesota Vikings – Game summary

Quarter	1	2	3	4	Total
**Lions**	7	10	6	7	**30**
Vikings	7	7	7	3	**24**

at U.S. Bank Stadium, Minneapolis, Minnesota

- Date: December 24
- Game time: 12:00 p.m. CST
- Game weather: None (indoor stadium)
- Game attendance: 66,932
- Referee: Land Clark (130)
- TV announcers (Fox): Kenny Albert, Jonathan Vilma and Shannon Spake
- Recap, Game Book

Game information

**First quarter**

- DET – David Montgomery 1-yard run (Michael Badgley kick), 7:13. Lions 7–0. **Drive: 14 plays, 75 yards, 7:47.**
- MIN – Ty Chandler 2-yard run (Greg Joseph kick), 2:51. Tied 7–7. **Drive: 9 plays, 75 yards, 4:22.**

**Second quarter**

- DET – Michael Badgley 37-yard field goal, 5:05. Lions 10–7. **Drive: 13 plays, 60 yards, 6:58.**
- DET – Jahmyr Gibbs 14-yard run (Michael Badgley kick), 1:48. Lions 17–7. **Drive: 3 plays, 33 yards, 0:50.**
- MIN – Justin Jefferson 26-yard pass from Nick Mullens (Greg Joseph kick), 0:29. Lions 17–14. **Drive: 6 plays, 75 yards, 1:19.**

**Third quarter**

- MIN – K. J. Osborn 6-yard pass from Nick Mullens (Greg Joseph kick), 11:56. Vikings 21–17. **Drive: 5 plays, 81 yards, 3:04.**
- DET – Amon-Ra St. Brown 1-yard pass from Jared Goff (kick blocked), 4:38. Lions 23–21. **Drive: 13 plays, 75 yards, 7:18.**

**Fourth quarter**

- DET – Jahmyr Gibbs 3-yard run (Michael Badgley kick), 11:07. Lions 30–21. **Drive: 14 plays, 83 yards, 6:54.**
- MIN – Greg Joseph 26-yard field goal, 5:19. Lions 30–24. **Drive: 8 plays, 76 yards, 2:12.**

**Top passers**

- DET – Jared Goff – 30/40, 257 yards, TD
- MIN – Nick Mullens – 22/36, 411 yards, 2 TD, 4 INT

**Top rushers**

- DET – Jahmyr Gibbs – 15 rushes, 80 yards, 2 TD
- MIN – Ty Chandler – 8 rushes, 17 yards, TD

**Top receivers**

- DET – Amon-Ra St. Brown – 12 receptions, 106 yards, TD
- MIN – Justin Jefferson – 6 receptions, 141 yards, TD

==== Week 17: vs. Green Bay Packers ====
Week 17: Green Bay Packers at Minnesota Vikings – Game summary

Quarter	1	2	3	4	Total
**Packers**	10	13	7	3	**33**
Vikings	0	3	0	7	**10**

at U.S. Bank Stadium, Minneapolis, Minnesota

- Date: December 31
- Game time: 7:20 p.m. CST
- Game weather: None (indoor stadium)
- Game attendance: 67,003
- Referee: Clay Martin (19)
- TV announcers (NBC): Mike Tirico, Cris Collinsworth and Melissa Stark
- Recap, Game Book

Game information

**First quarter**

- GB – Anders Carlson 34-yard field goal, 6:43. Packers 3–0. **Drive: 12 plays, 64 yards, 5:53.**
- GB – Jayden Reed 33-yard pass from Jordan Love (Anders Carlson kick), 5:10. Packers 10–0. **Drive: 2 plays, 33 yards, 0:48.**

**Second quarter**

- MIN – Greg Joseph 54-yard field goal, 9:25. Packers 10–3. **Drive: 7 plays, 40 yards, 3:54.**
- GB – Jordan Love 2-yard run (Anders Carlson kick), 3:59. Packers 17–3. **Drive: 10 plays, 75 yards, 5:26.**
- GB – Jarran Reed 25-yard pass from Jordan Love (kick failed, wide left), 0:08. Packers 23–3. **Drive: 3 plays, 37 yards, 0:18.**

**Third quarter**

- GB – Bo Melton 9-yard pass from Jordan Love (Anders Carlson kick), 0:49. Packers 30–3. **Drive: 13 plays, 90 yards, 8:00.**

**Fourth quarter**

- MIN – Johnny Mundt 6-yard pass from Nick Mullens (Greg Joseph kick), 14:06. Packers 30–10. **Drive: 2 plays, 7 yards, 0:44.**
- GB – Anders Carlson 37-yard field goal, 6:11. Packers 33–10. **Drive: 13 plays, 57 yards, 7:55.**

**Top passers**

- GB – Jordan Love – 24/33, 256 yards, 3 TD
- MIN – Nick Mullens – 13/22, 113 yards, TD

**Top rushers**

- GB – Aaron Jones – 20 rushes, 120 yards
- MIN – Ty Chandler – 10 rushes, 40 yards

**Top receivers**

- GB – Bo Melton – 6 receptions, 105 yards, TD
- MIN – Justin Jefferson – 5 receptions, 59 yards

==== Week 18: at Detroit Lions ====
Week 18: Minnesota Vikings at Detroit Lions – Game summary

Quarter	1	2	3	4	Total
Vikings	0	6	7	7	**20**
**Lions**	13	0	7	10	**30**

at Ford Field, Detroit, Michigan

- Date: January 7
- Game time: 1:00 p.m. EST/12:00 p.m. CST
- Game weather: None (indoor stadium)
- Game attendance: 63,233
- Referee: Brad Rogers (126)
- TV announcers (Fox): Joe Davis, Daryl Johnston and Pam Oliver
- Recap, Game Book

Game information

**First quarter**

- DET – Sam LaPorta 2-yard pass from Jared Goff (Michael Badgley kick), 8:06. Lions 7–0. **Drive: 4 plays, 52 yards, 2:01.**
- DET – Jahmyr Gibbs 3-yard run (kick failed, wide left), 2:12. Lions 13–0. **Drive: 8 plays, 64 yards, 3:53.**

**Second quarter**

- MIN – Greg Joseph 39-yard field goal, 9:20. Lions 13–3. **Drive: 14 plays, 59 yards, 7:52.**
- MIN – Greg Joseph 43-yard field goal, 0:00. Lions 13–6. **Drive: 7 plays, 57 yards, 1:12.**

**Third quarter**

- DET – David Montgomery 1-yard run (Michael Badgley kick), 7:14. Lions 20–6. **Drive: 9 plays, 71 yards, 4:15.**
- MIN – Justin Jefferson 38-yard pass from Nick Mullens (Greg Joseph kick), 0:20. Lions 20–13. **Drive: 6 plays, 80 yards, 3:17.**

**Fourth quarter**

- DET – Amon-Ra St. Brown 70-yard pass from Jared Goff (Michael Badgley kick), 14:45. Lions 27–13. **Drive: 2 plays, 75 yards, 0:35.**
- MIN – Jordan Addison 42-yard pass from Nick Mullens (Greg Joseph kick), 13:22. Lions 27–20. **Drive: 3 plays, 75 yards, 1:23.**
- DET – Michael Badgley 39-yard field goal, 8:14. Lions 30–20. **Drive: 10 plays, 54 yards, 5:08.**

**Top passers**

- MIN – Nick Mullens – 30/44, 396 yards, 2 TD, 2 INT
- DET – Jared Goff – 23/32, 320 yards, 2 TD

**Top rushers**

- MIN – Ty Chandler – 12 rushes, 69 yards
- DET – David Montgomery – 10 rushes, 40 yards, TD

**Top receivers**

- MIN – Justin Jefferson – 12 receptions, 192 yards, TD
- DET – Amon-Ra St. Brown – 7 receptions, 144 yards, TD

With this loss, the Vikings finished the season on a four-game losing streak, their first since 2016. They were also swept by the Lions for the first time since that same season. Their 7–10 record was their first double-digit losing season since 2013, which also saw the Vikings go through a quarterback carousel driven by injuries and poor play.

=== Standings ===
==== Division ====
NFC North
	W	L	T	PCT	DIV	CONF	PF	PA	STK
^{(3)} Detroit Lions	12	5	0	.706	4–2	8–4	461	395	W1
^{(7)} Green Bay Packers	9	8	0	.529	4–2	7–5	383	350	W3
Minnesota Vikings	7	10	0	.412	2–4	6–6	344	362	L4
Chicago Bears	7	10	0	.412	2–4	6–6	360	379	L1

==== Conference ====
NFC
#	Team	Division	W	L	T	PCT	DIV	CONF	SOS	SOV	STK
**Division leaders**
1 (Note: San Francisco finished ahead of Dallas and Detroit based on conference record, claiming the No. 1 seed.)	San Francisco 49ers	West	12	5	0	.706	5–1	10–2	.509	.475	L1
2 (Note: Dallas claimed the No. 2 seed over Detroit based on head-to-head victory.)	Dallas Cowboys	East	12	5	0	.706	5–1	9–3	.446	.392	W2
3	Detroit Lions	North	12	5	0	.706	4–2	8–4	.481	.436	W1
4 (Note: Tampa Bay finished ahead of New Orleans in the NFC South based on common record. (Tampa Bay is 8–4 against Minnesota, Chicago, Detroit, Green Bay, Atlanta, Carolina, Houston, Tennessee, Jacksonville, and Indianapolis, while New Orleans is 6–6 against the same teams.))	Tampa Bay Buccaneers	South	9	8	0	.529	4–2	7–5	.481	.379	W1
**Wild cards**
5	Philadelphia Eagles	East	11	6	0	.647	4–2	7–5	.481	.476	L2
6	Los Angeles Rams	West	10	7	0	.588	5–1	8–4	.529	.453	W4
7 (Note: Green Bay and Seattle finished ahead of New Orleans based on conference record.) (Note: Green Bay finished ahead of Seattle based on strength of victory, claiming the 7th and final playoff spot.)	Green Bay Packers	North	9	8	0	.529	4–2	7–5	.474	.458	W3
**Did not qualify for the postseason**
8	Seattle Seahawks	West	9	8	0	.529	2–4	7–5	.512	.392	W1
9	New Orleans Saints	South	9	8	0	.529	4–2	6–6	.433	.340	W2
10 (Note: Minnesota finished ahead of Atlanta based on head-to-head victory. Division tie break was initially used to eliminate Chicago (see below).) (Note: Minnesota finished ahead of Chicago based on common record. (Minnesota is 5–7 against Tampa Bay, Los Angeles Chargers, Carolina, Kansas City, Green Bay, Atlanta, New Orleans, Denver, Las Vegas, and Detroit, while Chicago is 4–8 against the same teams.))	Minnesota Vikings	North	7	10	0	.412	2–4	6–6	.509	.454	L4
11 (Note: Chicago finished ahead of Atlanta based on head-to-head victory.)	Chicago Bears	North	7	10	0	.412	2–4	6–6	.464	.370	L1
12	Atlanta Falcons	South	7	10	0	.412	3–3	4–8	.429	.462	L2
13	New York Giants	East	6	11	0	.353	3–3	5–7	.512	.353	W1
14 (Note: Washington finished ahead of Arizona based on head-to-head victory.)	Washington Commanders	East	4	13	0	.235	0–6	2–10	.512	.338	L8
15	Arizona Cardinals	West	4	13	0	.235	0–6	3–9	.561	.588	L1
16	Carolina Panthers	South	2	15	0	.118	1–5	1–11	.522	.500	L3
**Tiebreakers** (Note: When breaking ties for three or more teams under the NFL's rules, they are first broken within divisions, then comparing only the highest-ranked remaining team from each division.)

== Statistics ==
=== Team leaders ===
Category	Player(s)	Total
Passing yards	Kirk Cousins	2,331
Passing touchdowns	Kirk Cousins	18
Rushing yards	Alexander Mattison	700
Rushing touchdowns	Ty Chandler; Joshua Dobbs	3
Receptions	T. J. Hockenson	95
Receiving yards	Justin Jefferson	1,074
Receiving touchdowns	Jordan Addison	10
Points	Greg Joseph	108
Kickoff return yards	Kene Nwangwu	380
Punt return yards	Brandon Powell	289
Tackles	Camryn Bynum	137
Sacks	Danielle Hunter	16.5
Interceptions	Byron Murphy	3
Forced fumbles	Danielle Hunter; Josh Metellus	4

Source: Pro-Football-Reference.com

=== League rankings ===
Category	Total yards	Yards per game	NFL rank (out of 32)
Passing offense	4,359	256.4	5th
Rushing offense	1,553	91.4	29th
Total offense	5,912	347.8	10th
Passing defense	3,986	234.5	24th
Rushing defense	1,678	98.7	8th
Total defense	5,664	333.2	16th

Source: ProFootballReference.com
