= Ty Chandler =

Ty Chandler may refer to:

- Tyson Chandler (born 1982), American basketball player and coach
- Ty Chandler (American football) (born 1998), American football player
