= Storm Duck =

American football player (born 2000)

Profile
- Position: Cornerback

Personal information
- Born: December 15, 2000 (age 25); Boiling Springs, South Carolina, U.S.
- Listed height: 6 ft 0 in (1.83 m)
- Listed weight: 195 lb (88 kg)

Career information
- High school: Boiling Springs (SC)
- College: North Carolina (2019–2022); Louisville (2023)
- NFL draft: 2024: undrafted

Career history
- Miami Dolphins (2024–2026)

Awards and highlights
- Second-team All-ACC (2022)

Career NFL statistics as of 2025
- Games played: 16
- Total tackles: 37
- Pass deflections: 5
- Stats at Pro Football Reference

Storm Chandler Duck (born December 15, 2000) is an American professional football cornerback. He played college football at North Carolina and Louisville.

== Early life ==
Duck is the son of Phyllis and Todd Duck. He was named after Storm Logan, a character on the soap opera The Bold and the Beautiful. He grew up in Greenville, South Carolina, and moved to Spartanburg when he was seven. He played three years as a starting cornerback at Boiling Springs High School. In the state playoff semifinals as a sophomore, he intercepted a would-be game-winning touchdown and broke up a similar two-point conversion to put his team in the title game. He was a three-star recruit in the class of 2019 and committed to North Carolina over offers from Appalachian State, Army, Campbell, and Charleston Southern.

== College career ==
Duck made his first start for North Carolina on September 28, 2019, against Clemson, and made 13 appearances with 9 starts as a freshman. He missed much of the next two seasons due to injury. In the 2022 season, he led the Tar Heels in interceptions and passes defended and was named to the All-ACC second team. He transferred to Louisville after initially committing to Penn State.

== Professional career ==
Pre-draft measurables
Height	Weight	Arm length	Hand span	Wingspan	40-yard dash	10-yard split	20-yard split	20-yard shuttle	Three-cone drill	Vertical jump	Broad jump	Bench press
6 ft 0 1/4 in (1.84 m)	195 lb (88 kg)	32 1/8 in (0.82 m)	9 1/4 in (0.23 m)	6 ft 5 1/8 in (1.96 m)	4.43 s	1.55 s	2.53 s	4.25 s	7.10 s	39.0 in (0.99 m)	11 ft 2 in (3.40 m)	17 reps
All values from Pro Day

Duck signed as an undrafted free agent with the Miami Dolphins on April 27, 2024. He made the initial 53-man roster on August 27, 2024. In 14 appearances (three starts) during his rookie campaign, he recorded 35 tackles including one for a loss and four passes defended.

Duck made two appearances (one start) for Miami in 2025, recording one pass deflection and two combined tackles. On October 27, 2025, it was announced that Duck would miss the remainder of the season due to a knee injury he suffered in Week 8 against the Atlanta Falcons.

After beginning the 2026 season on the physically unable to perform list, Duck was released on October 20, 2026.
