= Greg Joseph =

South African gridiron football player (born 1994)

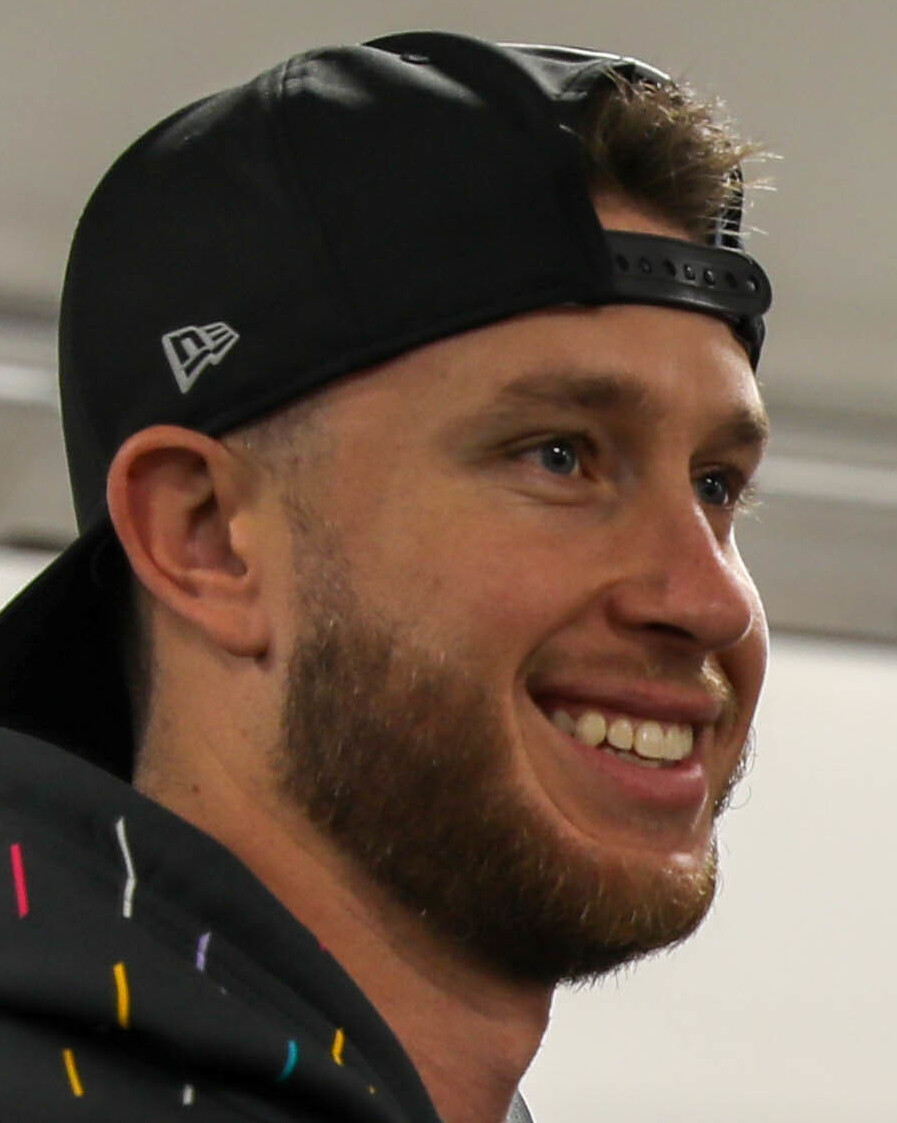
- Joseph in 2022

Profile
- Position: Placekicker

Personal information
- Born: August 4, 1994 (age 32); Johannesburg, South Africa
- Listed height: 6 ft 0 in (1.83 m)
- Listed weight: 208 lb (94 kg)

Career information
- High school: American Heritage School (Delray Beach, Florida, U.S.)
- College: Florida Atlantic (2013–2017)
- NFL draft: 2018: undrafted

Career history
- Miami Dolphins (2018)*; Cleveland Browns (2018); Carolina Panthers (2019)*; Tennessee Titans (2019); Tampa Bay Buccaneers (2020); Minnesota Vikings (2021–2023); Green Bay Packers (2024)*; Detroit Lions (2024)*; New York Giants (2024); Washington Commanders (2024); New York Jets (2024); San Francisco 49ers (2025)*; Las Vegas Raiders (2025)*
- * Offseason or practice squad member only

Awards and highlights
- Super Bowl champion (LV)

Career NFL statistics
- Field goals: 116
- Field goal attempts: 141
- Field goal %: 82.3
- Longest field goal: 61
- Touchbacks: 268
- Stats at Pro Football Reference

Greg Joseph (born August 4, 1994) is a South African professional American football placekicker. He played college football for the Florida Atlantic Owls and signed with the Miami Dolphins as an undrafted free agent in 2018. Joseph has also been a member of 13 different teams, most notably the Cleveland Browns, Tennessee Titans, Minnesota Vikings, New York Giants, Washington Commanders, and New York Jets. He won Super Bowl LV with the Tampa Bay Buccaneers.

== Early life ==
Joseph was born in Johannesburg, South Africa, to Glen and Ilana Joseph. In 2001, he and his family moved to West Boca Raton, Florida, as his family sought to leave South Africa, and his mother had family in Florida. Joseph has two younger brothers, Marc and Dylan. He is Jewish, and says that Judaism has "absolutely" guided him during his life.

Joseph played football and soccer at Donna Klein Jewish Academy in Boca Raton, Florida (and was named all-county and all-state) and high school football (where he was named all-county, all-state, and All-America by MaxPrep.com) at American Heritage School in Delray Beach, Florida. He decided to focus on football after recognizing that he stood a much better chance of getting a college scholarship and going pro in football than in soccer.

== College career ==
Joseph spent five years at Florida Atlantic University (FAU) in Boca Raton after walking onto the football team and redshirting his freshman year, and graduated in 2017 with a degree in exercise science and health promotion. Joseph graduated as the Owls' all-time leader in field goals made (57), points scored (336), points after touchdown (PATs) made (165; in 170 attempts), and field goals attempted. He also set the university's single-game records for PATs, field goals, points scored by kicking, and the Owls' longest field goal (54 yards). Joseph was named Honorable Mention All-Conference USA in his redshirt junior and redshirt senior seasons in 2016 and 2017, respectively.

As of February 2019, Joseph was working towards finishing his MBA at FAU.

== Professional career ==
Pre-draft measurables
Height	Weight	Arm length	Hand span
6 ft 0 1/4 in (1.84 m)	210 lb (95 kg)	31 1/2 in (0.80 m)	9 1/4 in (0.23 m)
All values from Pro Day

=== Miami Dolphins ===
After going undrafted in the 2018 NFL draft, Joseph was signed as a free agent by the Miami Dolphins. He made all three kicks he attempted in the preseason. Joseph was released on September 1, 2018.

=== Cleveland Browns ===
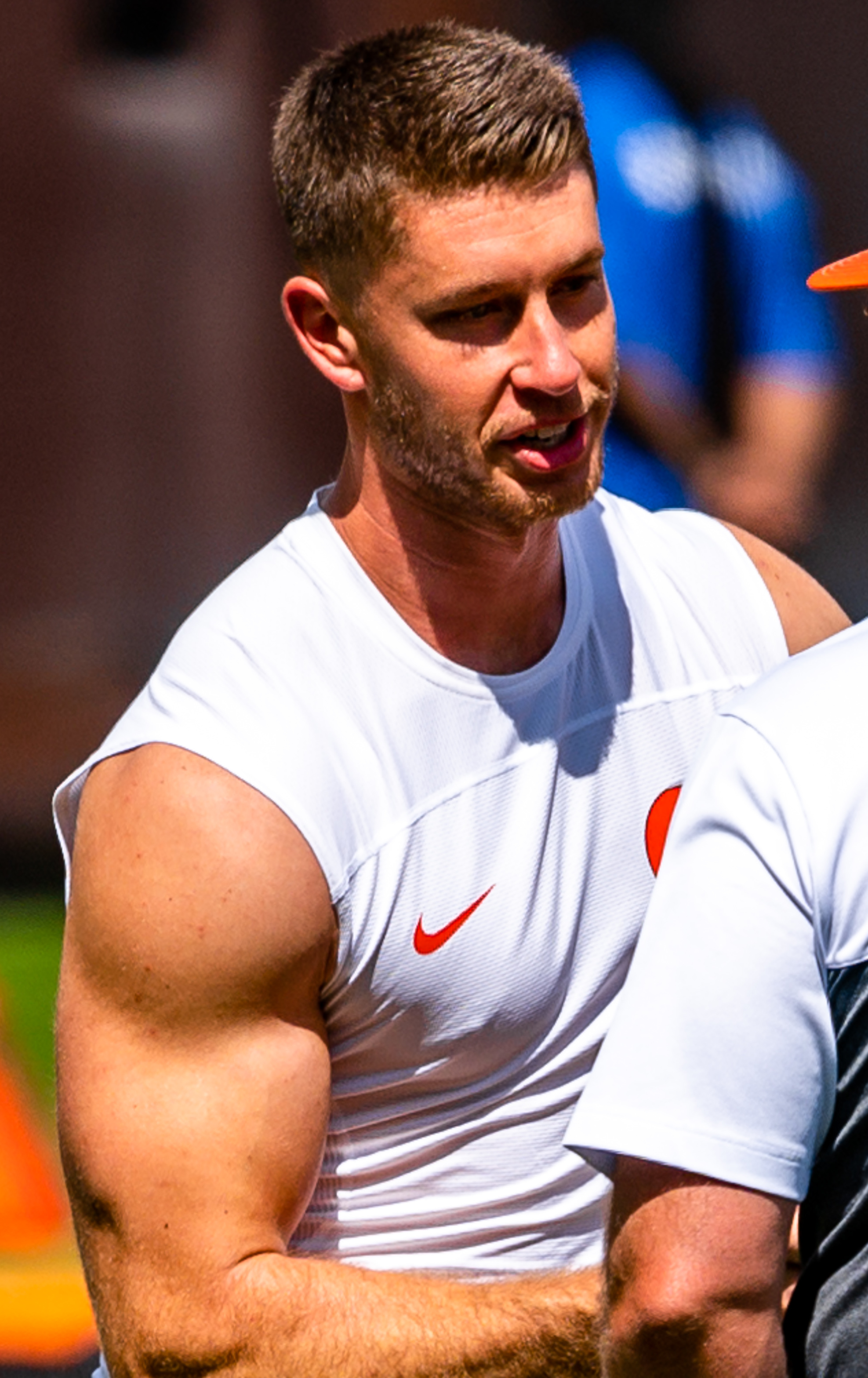
Joseph in 2019

Joseph was signed by the Cleveland Browns on September 17, 2018. He replaced Zane Gonzalez, who was cut from the team after missing two field goals and two extra points the previous day against the New Orleans Saints. During a Week 5 12–9 overtime victory over the Baltimore Ravens, Joseph made a game-winning 37-yard field goal in overtime.

In his lone season with the Browns, Joseph made 17 of 20 field goals, with a long of 51 (his three misses were beyond 40 yards), and made 25-of-29 extra points. Joseph was 4-of-4 from 20-to-29 yards, 7-of-7 from 30-to-39 yards, 5-of-7 from 40-to-49 yards and 1-of-2 from 50-plus yards. In 2018, he handled 69 total kickoffs and achieved a touchback on 68.1% of them.

On August 31, 2019, Joseph was released during final roster cuts after losing the kicker job to rookie Austin Seibert.

Joseph was drafted in the fifth round of the fifth phase of the 2020 XFL draft by the Seattle Dragons in October 2019, but did not sign with them.

=== Carolina Panthers ===
On November 25, 2019, Joseph was signed to the practice squad of the Carolina Panthers.

=== Tennessee Titans ===
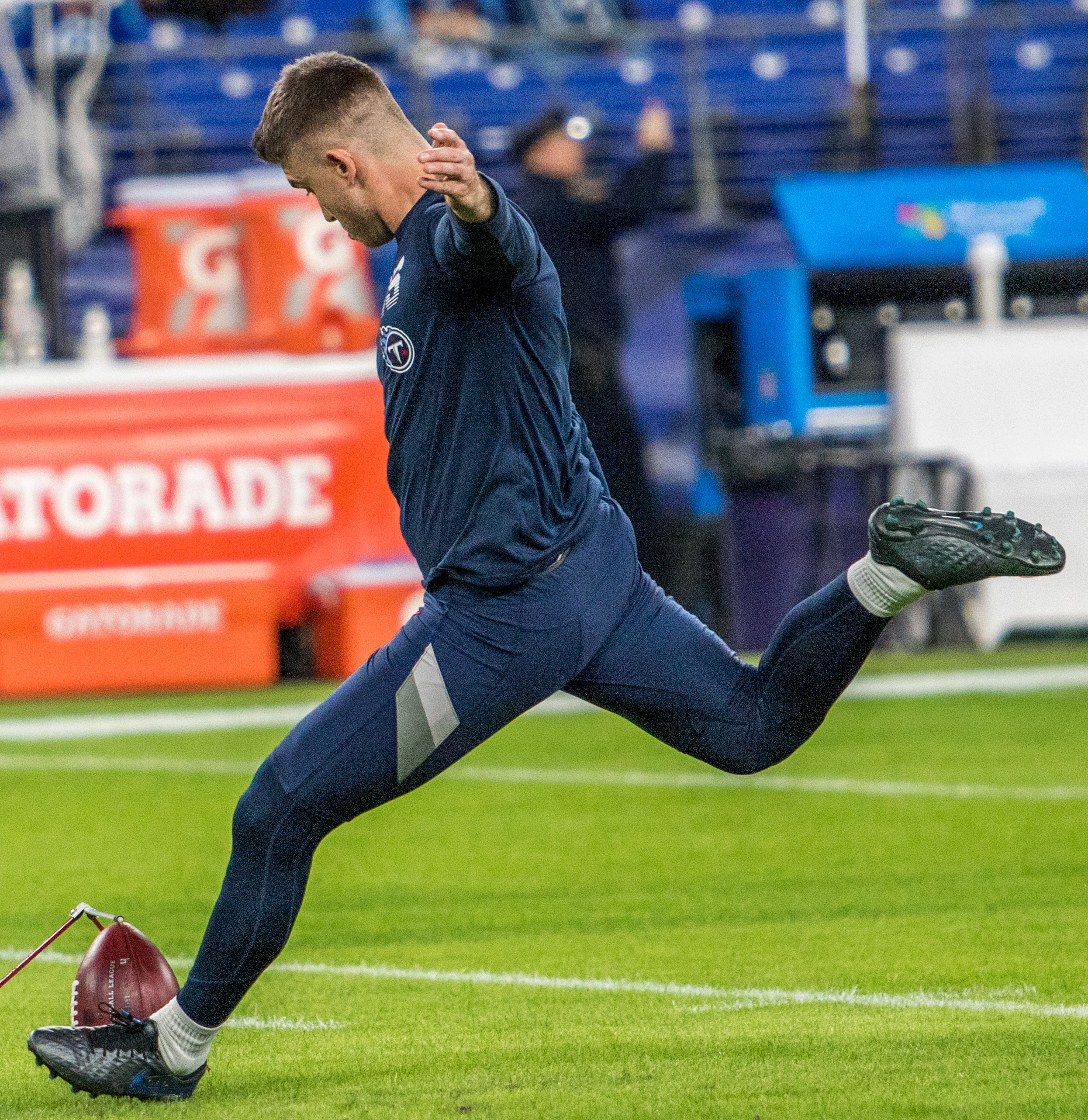
Joseph in 2020

On December 18, 2019, the Tennessee Titans signed Joseph to a three-year contract off Carolina's practice squad, after waiving kicker Ryan Santoso and placing kicker Ryan Succop on injured reserve. He made his Titans debut four days later, kicking four extra points in a 38–28 loss to the Saints. In the next game against the Houston Texans, Joseph went 5-for-5 on extra points during the 35–14 road victory.

Joseph did not attempt a field goal until his fifth game with the Titans when he made a 30-yard kick in the first quarter of the AFC Championship Game against the Kansas City Chiefs. Joseph went 15-for-15 on extra points before his first field goal attempt.

On September 3, 2020, Joseph was waived by the Titans after the team signed Stephen Gostkowski to assume kicking duties.

=== Tampa Bay Buccaneers ===
On September 8, 2020, Joseph signed to the practice squad of the Tampa Bay Buccaneers. He was elevated to the active roster on December 18 for the team's Week 15 game against the Atlanta Falcons, and reverted to the practice squad after the game.

=== Minnesota Vikings ===
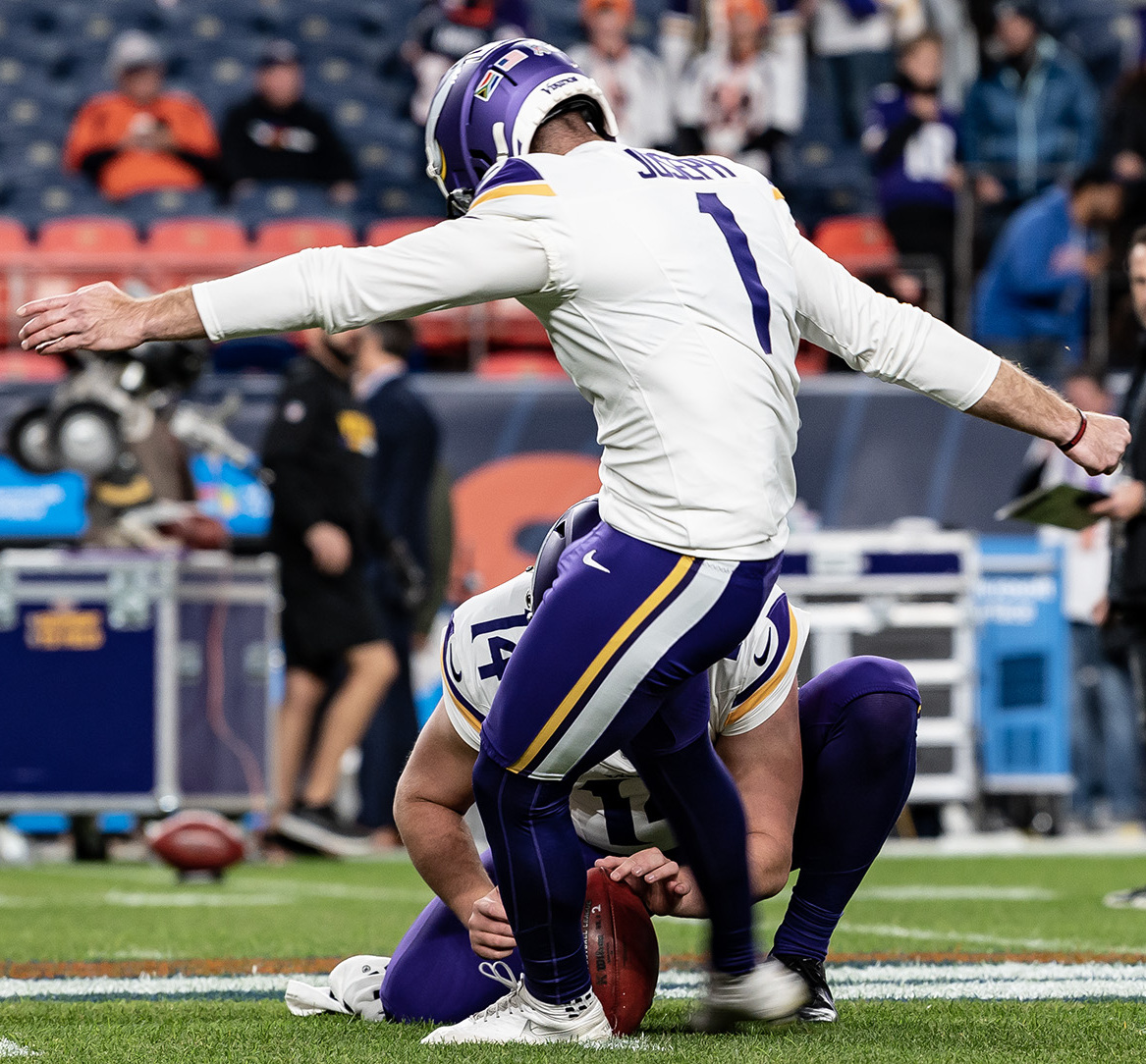
Joseph in 2023

On February 11, 2021, Joseph signed with the Minnesota Vikings to replace a struggling Dan Bailey. During a narrow Week 2 34–33 road loss to the Arizona Cardinals, Joseph missed a game-winning 37-yard field goal attempt as time expired. Three weeks later against the Detroit Lions, he made a game-winning 54-yard field goal in the narrow 19–17 victory. In the next game, Joseph missed another game-winning field goal against the Carolina Panthers, but the Vikings would go on to win on the road 34–28 in overtime. During Week 11 against the Green Bay Packers, he made his second game-winning field goal of the season in the 34–31 victory.

During Week 4 against the Saints in London in 2022, Joseph converted all five field goal attempts, including a 47-yard game-winner in the 28–25 victory. He was named NFC Special Teams Player of the Week for his performance against the Saints. During a Week 15 39–36 overtime victory over the Indianapolis Colts, Joseph made all four of his extra point attempts and a 40-yard field goal in overtime despite an attempt to ice him, helping the Vikings achieve the biggest comeback in NFL history. In the next game against the New York Giants, Joseph hit a 61-yard game winning field goal during the 27–24 victory, setting a Vikings franchise record for longest made field goal.

On March 14, 2023, Joseph signed a one-year contract extension with the Vikings. In the 2023 season, he converted 24 of 30 field goals and 36 of 38 extra point attempts.

=== Green Bay Packers ===
On March 28, 2024, Joseph signed with the Green Bay Packers. Joseph made the initial 53-man roster, but was released on August 28.

=== Detroit Lions ===
On September 11, 2024, Joseph was signed to the Detroit Lions' practice squad.

=== New York Giants ===
On September 17, 2024, the New York Giants signed Joseph to their active roster from the Lions practice squad after Graham Gano was injured. In Week 6 against the Cincinnati Bengals, Joseph missed two field goals in the fourth quarter, including one that would have kept them in the game with under a minute left in regulation, which resulted in a 17–7 loss. On November 7, he was waived with an injury settlement.

=== Washington Commanders ===
On December 13, 2024, Joseph signed with the Washington Commanders' practice squad. He was elevated for the Week 15 game against the New Orleans Saints. Joseph was released on December 23.

=== New York Jets ===
On December 24, 2024, Joseph was signed to the New York Jets' practice squad. He was signed to the team's active roster on December 31, after Greg Zuerlein was placed on injured reserve.

In the 2024 season, Joseph finished converting all 11 extra point attempts and 16 of 20 field goal attempts.

=== San Francisco 49ers ===
On May 19, 2025, Joseph signed with the San Francisco 49ers to a one-year contract. He was released on August 4.

=== Las Vegas Raiders ===
On November 11, 2025, Joseph was signed to the Las Vegas Raiders' practice squad. He was released on December 2.

== Career statistics ==
=== NFL ===
Legend
	Won the Super Bowl
	Led the league
**Bold**	Career high

==== Regular season ====
Year	Team	GP	Overall FGs					PATs				Kickoffs				Points
Year	Team	GP	Blk	Lng	FGA	FGM	Pct	XPA	XPM	Pct	Blk	KO	Avg	TB	Ret	Points
2018	CLE	14	0	51	20	17	85.0	29	25	86.2	0	69	63.5	47	20	76
2019	TEN	2	0	0	0	0	—	9	9	**100.0**	0	11	62.6	6	5	9
2020	TB	0	DNP													
2021	MIN	**17**	0	55	**38**	**33**	86.8	40	36	90.0	0	**94**	63.9	**76**	18	**135**
2022	MIN	**17**	**2**	**61**	33	26	78.8	**46**	**40**	87.0	0	89	63.4	54	**34**	118
2023	MIN	**17**	1	54	30	24	80.0	38	36	94.7	**1**	79	64.4	61	18	108
2024	NYG	6	0	52	16	13	81.3	6	6	**100.0**	0	27	**65.0**	15	4	30
2024	WAS	1	0	41	3	2	66.7	2	2	**100.0**	0	5	64.0	0	0	8
2024	NYJ	1	0	20	1	1	**100.0**	1	1	**100.0**	0	6	56.0	1	0	6
Total		75	3	61	141	116	82.3	173	157	90.7	1	380	64.0	268	81	505

==== Postseason ====
Year	Team	GP	Overall FGs					PATs				Kickoffs				Points
Year	Team	GP	Blk	Lng	FGA	FGM	Pct	XPA	XPM	Pct	Blk	KO	Avg	TB	Ret	Points
2019	TEN	**3**	0	30	**1**	**1**	**100.0**	**9**	**9**	**100.0**	0	**14**	62.5	**5**	**9**	**12**
2020	TB	0	DNP													
2022	MIN	1	0	**38**	**1**	**1**	**100.0**	3	3	**100.0**	0	6	**64.7**	4	1	6
Total		4	0	38	2	2	100.0	12	12	100.0	0	20	63.2	9	10	18

=== College ===
Year	G	XPM	XPA	XP%	FGM	FGA	FG%	Pts
2014	11	34	35	97.1	14	20	70.0	76
2015	12	28	28	100.0	18	27	66.7	82
2016	12	39	39	100.0	10	14	71.4	69
2017	14	64	68	94.1	15	21	71.4	109
**Career**	**49**	**165**	**170**	**97.1**	**57**	**82**	**69.5**	**336**

== See also ==
- List of select Jewish football players
