= Dylan Thompson =

American football player and coach (born 1991)

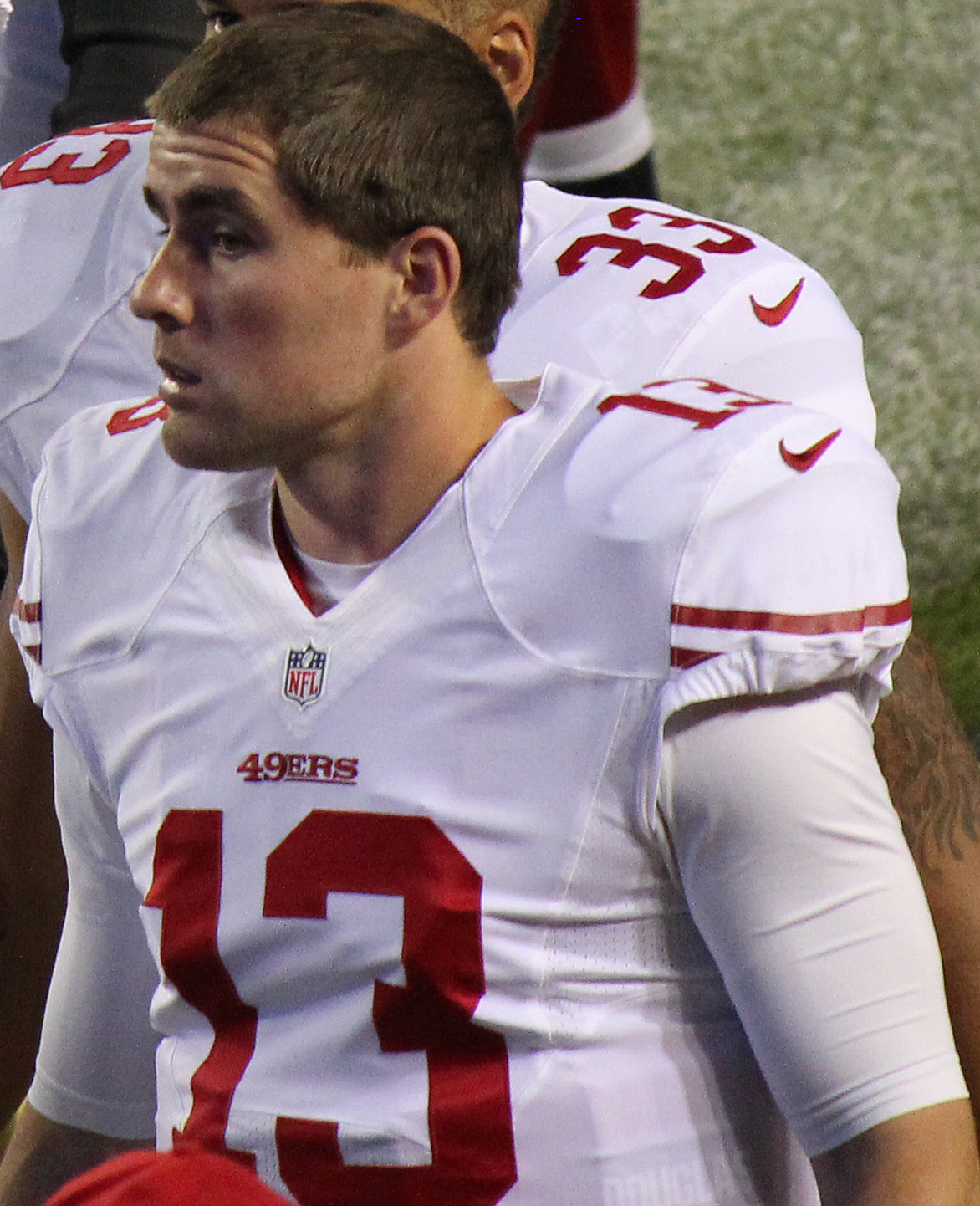
- Thompson with the San Francisco 49ers in 2015

Washington Commanders
- Title: Senior director of team support and advancement

Personal information
- Born: October 25, 1991 (age 35); Boiling Springs, South Carolina, U.S.
- Listed height: 6 ft 3 in (1.91 m)
- Listed weight: 218 lb (99 kg)

Career information
- Position: Quarterback
- High school: Boiling Springs
- College: South Carolina (2010–2014)
- NFL draft: 2015: undrafted

Career history

Playing
- San Francisco 49ers (2015); Los Angeles Rams (2016–2017)*
- * Offseason or practice squad member only

Operations
- Charleston Southern men's basketball (2017) Director of player development; Detroit Lions (2018–2020) Character coach; Houston Texans (2021–2023) Director of team development; Washington Commanders (2024–present) Senior director of team support and advancement
- Stats at Pro Football Reference

Dylan Thompson (born October 24, 1991) is an American professional football former quarterback who is the senior director of team support and advancement for the Washington Commanders of the National Football League (NFL). He played college football for the South Carolina Gamecocks. Thompson was a member of the NFL's San Francisco 49ers and Los Angeles Rams before becoming a character coach in 2017, working with the Charleston Southern Buccaneers men's basketball team and the NFL's Detroit Lions and Houston Texans.

== Early life ==
Thompson was born on October 24, 1991, in Boiling Springs, South Carolina. He attended Boiling Springs High School, earning scholarship offers in both football and basketball. He signed with South Carolina on June 15, 2009. During his high school career, Thompson threw for 1,300 yards, rushed for 500 yards, and accounted for 21 touchdowns in just six games, leading his high school to an 8-4 record before losing to AAAA state finalist Sumter in his junior year. Despite being hindered by a shoulder injury, he was selected for the Shrine Bowl of the Carolinas. Thompson also averaged 17 points, 5 rebounds, and 5 assists per game in basketball, earning a scholarship from Louisiana Tech. Rated a two-star prospect, he had other offers from East Carolina University, Kentucky, Vanderbilt, and Furman. Thompson was also ranked the 94th quarterback in his graduating class in the nation.

== College career ==
After redshirting during the 2010 season, Thompson's first significant amount of play time would come during the 2012 season. He earned his first career start on September 8, 2012, after Connor Shaw was injured during the season opener at Vanderbilt. Thompson would use that opportunity to lead the Gamecocks to a 48–10 route of East Carolina. He finished the season with 66 completions on 127 passing attempts, netting 1,027 passing yards and 11 touchdowns (1 rushing).

In 2013, Thompson again performed backup duties. He played in 10 of the Gamecocks' 13 games, earning a start at conference foe Missouri. Thompson finished the season with 52 completions on 89 passing attempts, netting 783 passing yards and 5 touchdowns (1 rushing).

Prior to the 2014 season, Thompson was named the starting quarterback. Thompson started all 13 games for the Gamecocks. Despite his record-breaking offensive performance, he led the team to a comparatively lackluster season, largely due to poor defensive play. He would end the season (and his college career) with a 24–21 victory over the Miami Hurricanes in the 2014 Independence Bowl and as the SEC leader in several passing statistics.

== Professional career ==
Pre-draft measurables
Height	Weight	Arm length	Hand span	Wingspan	40-yard dash	10-yard split	20-yard split	20-yard shuttle	Three-cone drill	Vertical jump	Broad jump
6 ft 1 3/4 in (1.87 m)	217 lb (98 kg)	31 3/4 in (0.81 m)	9 1/2 in (0.24 m)	6 ft 5 in (1.96 m)	4.74 s	1.69 s	2.68 s	4.35 s	7.27 s	35.0 in (0.89 m)	9 ft 5 in (2.87 m)
All values from Pro Day

=== San Francisco 49ers ===
After going undrafted in the 2015 NFL draft, Thompson signed with the San Francisco 49ers on May 5, 2015. He joined former Gamecock teammates Bruce Ellington and Mike Davis on the 49ers. Thompson was released by the 49ers on September 5, 2015, due to roster cuts.

Thompson was signed to the 49ers' practice squad on September 6, 2015. He was promoted to the active roster on November 21, 2015, as backup to Blaine Gabbert after Colin Kaepernick was placed on injured reserve for the rest of the season. On May 6, 2016, Thompson was released by the 49ers.

=== Los Angeles Rams ===
On June 7, 2016, Thompson was signed by the Los Angeles Rams. On August 30, 2016, he was released by the Rams.

On May 30, 2017, Thompson was re-signed by the Rams. He was waived by the Rams on June 15, 2017.

== Player development ==
=== Charleston Southern ===
In September 2017, Thompson was hired as director of player development for the Charleston Southern Buccaneers men's basketball team.

=== Detroit Lions ===
In 2018, Thompson was hired by the Detroit Lions as a character coach. While he assisted with many programs his main duties were to help players with the NFL transition and to help with support off of the field.

=== Houston Texans ===
On February 11, 2021, Thompson was hired as the director of team development for the Houston Texans.

=== Washington Commanders ===
On June 25, 2024, Thompson was named the senior director of team support and advancement of the Washington Commanders.
