= Donna Klein Jewish Academy =

Coordinates: 26.35793°N 80.19591°W

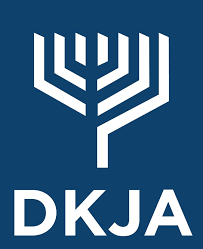

Location
- 9701 Donna Klein Blvd. Boca Raton, Florida, United States

Information
- School type: Private Jewish Day School
- Established: 1979
- Head of school: Helena Levine
- Faculty: 143
- Grades: K–12
- Enrollment: 780
- Colors: Blue and White
- Mascot: Eagles
- Accreditation: Southern Association of Colleges and Schools (SACS) Florida Council of Independent Schools (FCIS) Florida Kindergarten Council (FKC)
- Website: www.dkja.net

Donna Klein Jewish Academy (also known as DKJA) is a private, Jewish, co-ed school in unincorporated Palm Beach County, Florida, US, near Boca Raton, for grades K–12. It is located on the Jewish Federation of South Palm Beach County 100-acre campus, along with other Jewish community services and institutions.

== History ==
Donna Klein Jewish Academy was founded by a group of local parents in 1979, as South County Jewish Community Day School, a satellite campus of the Jewish Community Day School of Palm Beach, in a temporary location at Temple Beth El. It opened with 50 students, ranged across grades 1-6.

Shirley Enselberg led the parent group and became the first president of the school. Through community fundraising, they were able to move to a permanent location the following year, and add a middle school in 1983.

Throughout the years, DKJA has received a number of awards, including being named the Number 1 Jewish High School in Florida by Niche.com in 2023-24 and Number 2 in the United States in 2024-25.

== Notable alumni ==
Greg Joseph, placekicker for the New York Jets of the American Football Conference
