= Brooks Foster =

American gridiron football player (born 1986)

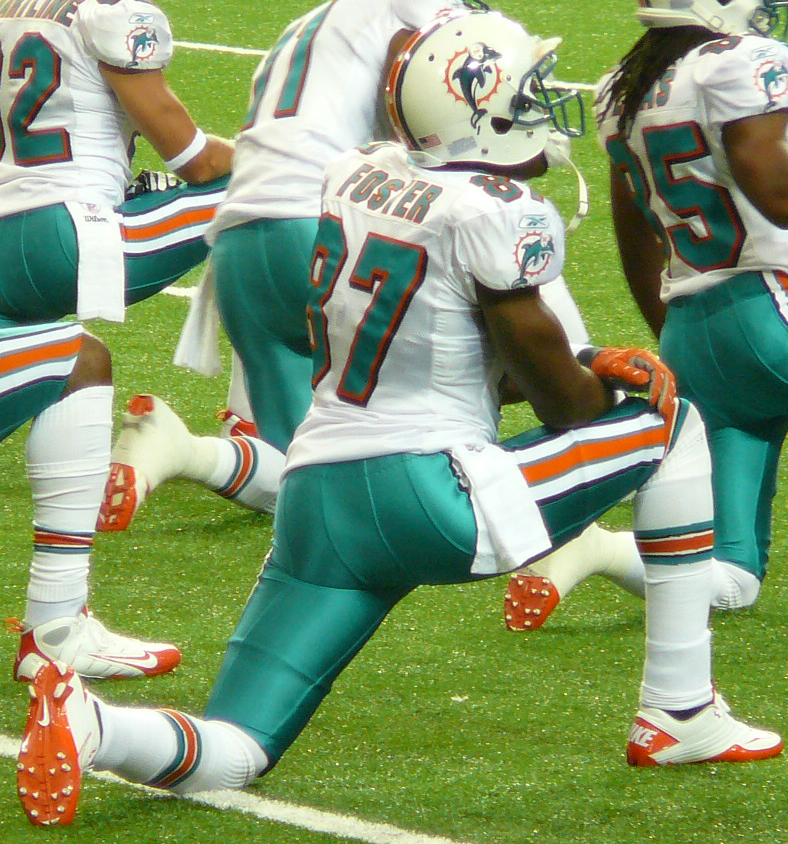
- Foster with the Miami Dolphins in 2011

No. 87
- Position: Wide receiver

Personal information
- Born: June 9, 1986 (age 40); Boiling Springs, South Carolina, U.S.
- Listed height: 6 ft 0 in (1.83 m)
- Listed weight: 205 lb (93 kg)

Career information
- High school: Boiling Springs (SC)
- College: North Carolina
- NFL draft: 2009: 5th round, 160th overall pick

Career history
- St. Louis Rams (2009); New York Jets (2010)*; Miami Dolphins (2010–2011)*; Saskatchewan Roughriders (2012)
- * Offseason or practice squad member only

Awards and highlights
- NCAA basketball champion (2005)
- Stats at Pro Football Reference

Brooks Foster (born April 9, 1986) is an American former professional football wide receiver. He was selected by the St. Louis Rams in the fifth round of the 2009 NFL draft. He played college football and basketball at North Carolina.

== Early life ==
Foster attended Boiling Springs High School in South Carolina. He caught 56 passes for 759 yards and seven touchdowns as a senior and caught 35 passes for 500 yards and scored eight touchdowns as a junior.

== College career ==
While redshirting on the Tar Heels football team during his freshman year in 2004–05, Foster walked on to the men's basketball team at North Carolina. As such, he was a member of the 2005 national championship team that gave coach Roy Williams his first ring.

As a senior at North Carolina in 2008, Brooks caught 30 passes for 334 yards and two touchdowns, playing in 13 games. In 2007 Brooks played in 11 games, with no starts. He was second on team with 417 receiving yards on 29 catches and two touchdowns. In 2006 he played in 12 games with no starts can caught 38 passes for 486 yards and two touchdowns. In 2005, he played in five games but did not record a catch and the previous season, 2004, he redshirted.

Foster holds the school wide receiver record in the bench press (405 lb) and power clean (353 lb).

== Professional career ==
=== Pre-draft ===
Pre-draft measurables
Height	Weight	40-yard dash	10-yard split	20-yard split	20-yard shuttle	Three-cone drill	Vertical jump	Broad jump	Bench press	Wonderlic
6 ft 0 1/2 in (1.84 m)	201 lb (91 kg)	4.38 s	1.52 s	2.59 s	4.18 s	6.87 s	38 1/2 in (0.98 m)	10 ft 7 in (3.23 m)	27 reps	22
Height, weight, bench and Wonderlic from NFL Combine, all others from NC Pro Day.

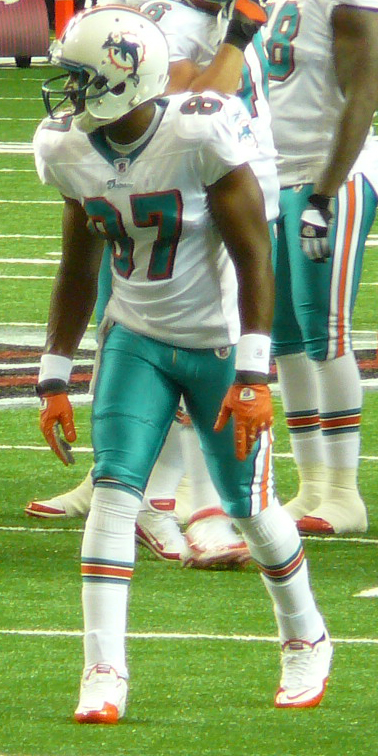
Foster with the Dolphins in 2011

Foster broke Eddie Royal's record for most bench press reps ever for a wide receiver at the NFL Combine.

=== St. Louis Rams ===
On April 26, 2009, Foster was selected in the fifth round by the St. Louis Rams with the 160th overall pick. Unfortunately, his rookie season would be cut short after injuring his ankle against the New York Jets during a preseason contest on August 14, 2009. Foster's injury required surgery and subsequently the then rookie was placed on the Injured Reserved list. In spite of the fact that Foster was striving to hang on with the Rams, Foster was waived by St. Louis on August 22, 2010.

=== New York Jets ===
On August 24, 2010, the New York Jets claimed Foster off waivers. Foster was later waived by New York on September 4, 2010.

=== Miami Dolphins ===
On September 30, 2010, the Miami Dolphins signed Foster to the team's practice squad. He was later waived on August 16, 2011.

=== Saskatchewan Roughriders ===
Foster was signed to the Saskatchewan Roughriders practice roster in July 2012. He played his first game for the Roughriders on September 1, 2012, in the Labour Day Classic against the Winnipeg Blue Bombers. He was released by the Roughriders on April 29, 2013.
