= NaJee Thompson =

American football player (born 2000)

Profile
- Position: Cornerback

Personal information
- Born: July 7, 2000 (age 26); Boiling Springs, South Carolina, U.S.
- Listed height: 5 ft 10 in (1.78 m)
- Listed weight: 205 lb (93 kg)

Career information
- High school: Boiling Springs
- College: Georgia Southern (2018–2022)
- NFL draft: 2023: undrafted

Career history
- Minnesota Vikings (2023–2024)

Career NFL statistics as of 2023
- Total tackles: 7
- Fumble recoveries: 1
- Stats at Pro Football Reference

NaJee Thompson (born July 7, 2000) is an American professional football cornerback. He played college football for the Georgia Southern Eagles and was signed by the Vikings as an undrafted free agent after the 2023 NFL draft.

== Early life ==
Thompson was born in Boiling Springs, South Carolina. He played high school football for the local team at Boiling Springs High School, where he played as a safety and wide receiver.

He was rated as a two-star athlete prospect by 247Sports, ranked the 50th player in South Carolina. He received offers from the Central Michigan Chippewas, the UMass Minutemen, the South Carolina State Bulldogs, the Western Carolina Catamounts and the Georgia Southern Eagles. He enrolled at Georgia Southern on June 1, 2018.

== College career ==
Thompson attended the Georgia Southern University and played college football for the Georgia Southern Eagles. In his first three seasons, from 2018 through 2020, he played at wide receiver. In the 2021 season, he switched to cornerback.

== Professional career ==
Pre-draft measurables
Height	Weight	Arm length	Hand span	40-yard dash	10-yard split	20-yard split	20-yard shuttle	Three-cone drill	Vertical jump	Broad jump	Bench press
5 ft 10 3/8 in (1.79 m)	200 lb (91 kg)	32 3/4 in (0.83 m)	9 1/8 in (0.23 m)	4.60 s	1.63 s	2.70 s	4.56 s	7.40 s	32.0 in (0.81 m)	9 ft 8 in (2.95 m)	13 reps
All values from Pro Day

After not being drafted in the 2023 NFL draft, Thompson was signed as an undrafted free agent by the Minnesota Vikings on April 29, 2023. On August 29, 2023, the Vikings announced that he had made the initial 53-man roster.

Thompson was waived on August 21, 2024, but returned to the team on injured reserve.

On April 23, 2025, Thompson was waived by the Vikings following a failed physical.
