= Ty Chandler (American football) =

American football player (born 1998)

No. 32 – New Orleans Saints
- Positions: Running back, kickoff returner
- Roster status: Injured reserve

Personal information
- Born: May 12, 1998 (age 28); Nashville, Tennessee, U.S.
- Listed height: 5 ft 11 in (1.80 m)
- Listed weight: 205 lb (93 kg)

Career information
- High school: Montgomery Bell (Nashville)
- College: Tennessee (2017–2020); North Carolina (2021)
- NFL draft: 2022: 5th round, 169th overall pick

Career history
- Minnesota Vikings (2022–2025); New Orleans Saints (2026–present)

Awards and highlights
- Second-team All-ACC (2021)

Career NFL statistics as of 2025
- Rushing yards: 710
- Rushing average: 3.9
- Rushing touchdowns: 3
- Receptions: 30
- Receiving yards: 212
- Return yards: 386
- Stats at Pro Football Reference

Tykevius Chandler (born May 12, 1998) is an American professional football running back and kickoff returner for the New Orleans Saints of the National Football League (NFL). He played college football for the Tennessee Volunteers before transferring to the North Carolina Tar Heels.

== Early life ==
Chandler grew up in Nashville, Tennessee and attended Montgomery Bell Academy. He was named Tennessee Mr. Football as a junior and as a senior.

== College career ==
Chandler began his collegiate career at Tennessee. He played at Tennessee from 2017 to 2020 under head coaches Butch Jones and Jeremy Pruitt.

In the 2018 season, Chandler became the first running back in school history to have a receiving touchdown in three consecutive games. Chandler rushed for 2,046 yards and 13 touchdowns in four seasons at Tennessee. Following the end of his senior season, he entered the NCAA transfer portal.

Chandler committed to transfer to the University of North Carolina and joined the team as a graduate transfer under head coach Mack Brown. He had five games on the season scoring multiple touchdowns, including a 198-yard performance against Virginia and a 213-yard performance against Wake Forest. In the Wake Forest game, he had four rushing touchdowns. In his lone season with the team, he rushed for 1,092 yards and 13 touchdowns on 182 carries and was named second-team All-Atlantic Coast Conference.

== Professional career ==
Pre-draft measurables
Height	Weight	Arm length	Hand span	Wingspan	40-yard dash	10-yard split	20-yard split	20-yard shuttle	Three-cone drill	Vertical jump	Broad jump	Bench press
5 ft 11 1/4 in (1.81 m)	204 lb (93 kg)	32 1/8 in (0.82 m)	9 in (0.23 m)	6 ft 3 5/8 in (1.92 m)	4.38 s	1.55 s	2.54 s	4.41 s	7.40 s	31.0 in (0.79 m)	10 ft 1 in (3.07 m)	15 reps
All values from NFL Combine/Pro Day

=== Minnesota Vikings ===
Chandler was selected by the Minnesota Vikings with 169th overall pick in the fifth round of the 2022 NFL draft. He was placed on injured reserve on October 11, 2022, with a thumb injury. He was activated on December 28. In the Vikings' Week 18 game against the Chicago Bears, he recorded six carries for 20 rushing yards. He appeared in three games in his rookie season.

Chandler began the 2023 season as the second-string running back behind Alexander Mattison. In Week 10 against the New Orleans Saints, he scored his first professional touchdown on a two-yard rush. In Week 15 against the Cincinnati Bengals, Chandler made his first NFL start and rushed for a career–high 132 yards on 23 carries. In the 2023 season, Chandler appeared in all 17 games and started the last four games. He recorded 102 carries for 461 rushing yards and three rushing touchdowns.

Chandler began the 2025 season as Minnesota's third-string running back behind Aaron Jones and Jordan Mason. After suffering a knee injury in the team's season opener against the Chicago Bears, he was placed on injured reserve on September 11, 2025. Chandler was activated on December 23, ahead of the team's Week 17 matchup against the Detroit Lions.

=== New Orleans Saints ===
On March 17, 2026, Chandler signed a one-year, $1.215 million contract with the New Orleans Saints. He was placed on injured reserve due to a season–ending knee injury on August 25.

== NFL career statistics ==
=== Regular season ===
Year	Team	Games		Rushing					Receiving					Kick returns					Fumbles	
Year	Team	GP	GS	Att	Yds	Avg	Lng	TD	Rec	Yds	Avg	Lng	TD	Ret	Yds	Avg	Lng	TD	Fum	Lost
2022	MIN	3	0	6	20	3.3	10	0	—	—	—	—	—	—	—	—	—	—	0	0
2023	MIN	17	4	102	461	4.5	31	3	21	159	7.6	19	0	4	97	24.3	33	0	0	0
2024	MIN	17	0	56	182	3.3	25	0	6	42	7.0	10	0	8	205	25.6	35	0	0	0
2025	MIN	3	0	17	47	2.8	5	0	3	11	3.7	11	0	3	84	28.0	33	0	0	0
Career		40	4	181	710	3.9	31	3	30	212	7.1	19	0	15	386	25.7	35	0	0	0
