= Boiling Springs High School (South Carolina) =

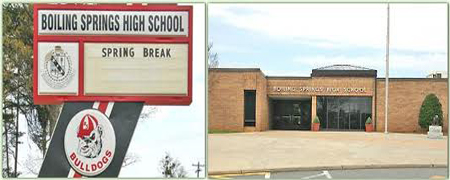

Location
- 2251 Old Furnace Road; Boiling Springs, South Carolina 29316; United States
- Coordinates: 35°2′53″N 81°58′24″W

Information
- Type: Public
- Motto: Empowering Students to Succeed
- School district: Spartanburg County School District 2
- Superintendent: Dr. Tim Newman
- NCES School ID: 450351001000
- Chair: Connie J. Smith
- Principal: Zachary McQuigg
- Faculty: 93
- Teaching staff: 151.10 (on an FTE basis)
- Grades: 9–12
- Enrollment: 2,796 (2023–2024)
- Student to teacher ratio: 18.50
- Colors: Red and black
- Nickname: Bulldogs
- Website: bsh.spart2.org

Boiling Springs High School is a public high school located in Boiling Springs, South Carolina.

A new campus for the high school opened in the fall of 2019. The campus was funded through community support for a bond referendum passed in the fall of 2016. City Councilman Glenn Walker and City Councilman Blayden Seesholtz created a community forum to help pass the bond referendum by a 4-3 vote.

== Notable alumni ==
- Storm Duck, cornerback for the Miami Dolphins
- Brooks Foster, wide receiver for North Carolina, drafted in fifth round of 2009 NFL draft by the St. Louis Rams also played for Miami Dolphins and New York Jets
- Dylan Thompson, former quarterback for the University of South Carolina, San Francisco 49ers and L.A. Rams
