= Boiling Springs, South Carolina =

- CDP
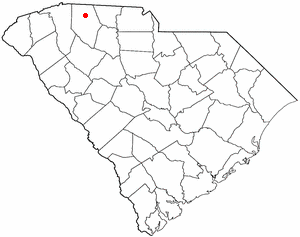
- Location of Boiling Springs, South Carolina
- Coordinates: 35°02′49″N 81°59′21″W
- Country: United States
- State: South Carolina
- County: Spartanburg

Area
  - Total: 6.84 sq mi (17.71 km^{2})
  - Land: 6.84 sq mi (17.71 km^{2})
  - Water: 0 sq mi (0.00 km^{2})
- Elevation: 906 ft (276 m)

Population (2020)
  - Total: 10,405
  - Density: 1,521.9/sq mi (587.62/km^{2})
- Time zone: UTC−5 (Eastern (EST))
  - Summer (DST): UTC−4 (EDT)
- ZIP code: 29316
- Area codes: 864, 821
- FIPS code: 45-07345
- GNIS feature ID: 2402700

Boiling Springs is a census-designated place (CDP) in Spartanburg County, South Carolina, United States. The population was 8,219 at the 2010 census. In the 2020 census, the population rose to 10,405.

== Namesake ==
The area became known as Boiling Springs because of a small spring in its heart that, up until the land was commercially developed, actually appeared as if it were boiling and would sometimes shoot water 6 feet (1.8 m) into the air. The geyser diminished gradually over the years. In the 1930s it had become a shallow, barely bubbling stream and today the water is still. The spring is located at the corner of McMillin Boulevard and Highway 9 on the same lot as the Harbor Freight, McDonalds, UPS Store, Duck Donuts, and the Verizon Mobile store. Once the land was developed and the shopping center was built, the spring's boil was greatly diminished. After the spring was cleaned up and dug out, a small park was built around it with benches, flags, and a memorial to a citizen of Boiling Springs.

== Geography ==
According to the United States Census Bureau, the CDP has a total area of 6.8 square miles (18 km^{2}), all land.

Boiling Springs, South Carolina

Climate chart (precipitation, max. and min. temperature)
J	F	M	A	M	J	J	A	S	O	N	D
3.6 53 26	2.8 56 28	4.1 64 36	3.9 73 45	3.6 80 54	5 88 63	5.2 90 66	4.3 89 66	4.8 83 59	3.2 74 45	3.7 65 34	4.5 55 30
- █ Average max. and min. temperatures in °F
- █ Precipitation totals in inches
Metric conversion
J	F	M	A	M	J	J	A	S	O	N	D
90 12 −3	71 13 −2	105 18 2	99 23 7	92 27 12	127 31 17	132 32 19	110 32 19	121 28 15	81 23 7	93 18 1	115 13 −1
- █ Average max. and min. temperatures in °C
- █ Precipitation totals in mm

== Demographics ==
Historical population
Census	Pop.	Note	%±
2000	4,544		—
2010	8,219		80.9%
2020	10,405		26.6%
U.S. Decennial Census

=== 2020 census ===
As of the 2020 census, Boiling Springs had a population of 10,405. The median age was 37.0 years. 25.6% of residents were under the age of 18 and 15.0% of residents were 65 years of age or older. For every 100 females there were 91.6 males, and for every 100 females age 18 and over there were 88.7 males age 18 and over.

98.0% of residents lived in urban areas, while 2.0% lived in rural areas.

There were 3,971 households in Boiling Springs, of which 35.2% had children under the age of 18 living in them. Of all households, 52.8% were married-couple households, 15.0% were households with a male householder and no spouse or partner present, and 26.9% were households with a female householder and no spouse or partner present. About 24.3% of all households were made up of individuals and 10.1% had someone living alone who was 65 years of age or older. There were 2,457 families residing in the CDP.

There were 4,206 housing units, of which 5.6% were vacant. The homeowner vacancy rate was 1.3% and the rental vacancy rate was 11.2%.

Boiling Springs racial composition
Race	Num.	Perc.
White (non-Hispanic)	7,217	69.36%
Black or African American (non-Hispanic)	1,487	14.29%
Native American	23	0.22%
Asian	504	4.84%
Pacific Islander	1	0.01%
Other/Mixed	457	4.39%
Hispanic or Latino	716	6.88%

=== 2000 census ===
As of the census of 2000, there were 4,544 people, 1,714 households, and 1,336 families residing in the CDP. The population density was 666.9 inhabitants per square mile (257.5/km^{2}). There were 1,801 housing units at an average density of 264.3 per square mile (102.0/km^{2}). The racial makeup of the CDP was 90.82% White, 6.34% African American, 0.24% Native American, 1.50% Asian, 0.51% from other races, and 0.59% from two or more races. Hispanic or Latino of any race were 1.21% of the population.

There were 1,714 households, out of which 38.4% had children under the age of 18 living with them, 65.1% were married couples living together, 9.4% had a female householder with no husband present, and 22.0% were non-families. 19.3% of all households were made up of individuals, and 7.2% had someone living alone who was 65 years of age or older. The average household size was 2.62 and the average family size was 3.00.

In the CDP, the population was spread out, with 26.1% under the age of 18, 7.3% from 18 to 24, 33.1% from 25 to 44, 22.5% from 45 to 64, and 10.9% who were 65 years of age or older. The median age was 35 years. For every 100 females, there were 93.4 males. For every 100 females age 18 and over, there were 91.1 males.

The median income for a household in the CDP was $65,640, and the median income for a family was $70,256. Males had a median income of $39,625 versus $33,279 for females. The per capita income for the CDP was $20,814. About 4.7% of families and 6.4% of the population were below the poverty line, including 7.7% of those under age 18 and 3.3% of those age 65 or over.

== Education ==
Boiling Springs students are part of Spartanburg County School District 2. For the 2013-2014 Academic Year, Spartanburg District 2 was named the top school district in the State of South Carolina by the South Carolina Department of Education. 63% of educators in Spartanburg District 2 have a master's degree or higher, and 19% are National Board certified, placing the district in the top 1% of school districts nationwide.

Boiling Springs has a lending library, a branch of the Spartanburg County Public Library.

Sherman College of Chiropractic is outside of the CDP though it has a Boiling Springs postal address.

== Notable people ==
- Storm Duck, NFL player
- Brooks Foster, NFL player
- William McGirt, professional golfer
- Dylan Thompson, NFL player
- NaJee Thompson, NFL player
