= 2021 Carolina Panthers season =

27th season in franchise history

- Owner: David Tepper
- General manager: Scott Fitterer
- Head coach: Matt Rhule
- Home stadium: Bank of America Stadium

Results
- Record: 5–12
- Division place: 4th NFC South
- Playoffs: Did not qualify
- Pro Bowlers: DE Brian Burns; CB Stephon Gilmore

Uniform
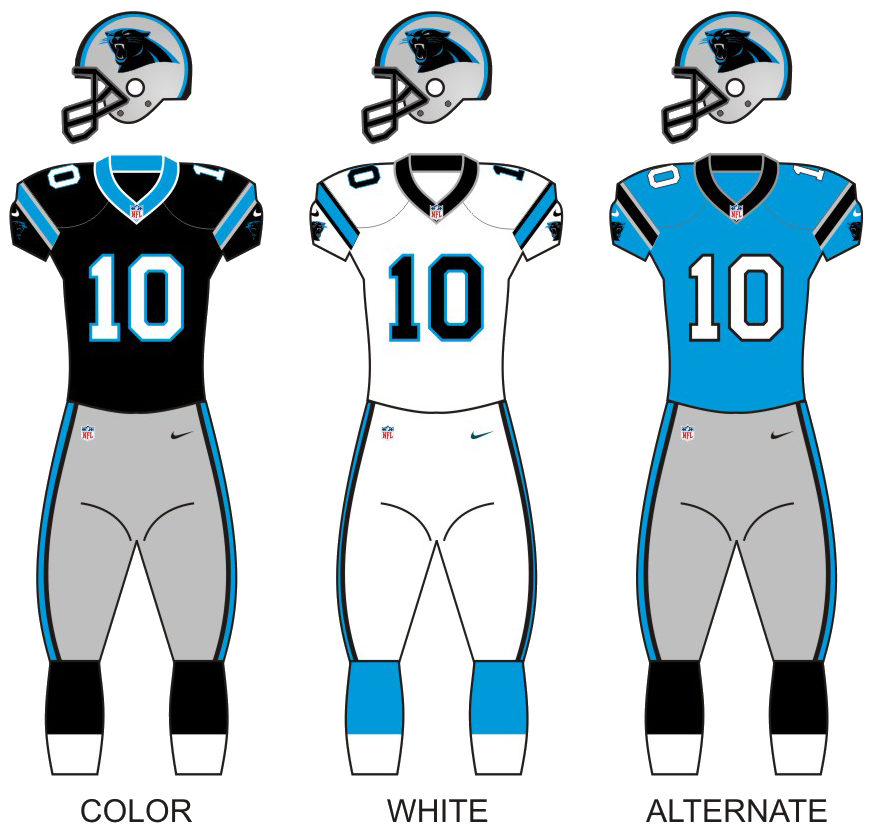

The 2021 season was the Carolina Panthers' 27th in the National Football League (NFL), their first under general manager Scott Fitterer, as well as the second and final full season under head coach Matt Rhule.

The team began the season by winning their first three games before losing the next four. With a Week 10 win against the Arizona Cardinals, they matched their five-win total from each of the two previous seasons. However, the Panthers fell into a seven-game losing streak and failed to improve on their 5–11 record from the previous two seasons. After a Week 16 loss to the Tampa Bay Buccaneers, the Panthers were eliminated from playoff contention for a fourth consecutive season. Ahead of Week 10, quarterback Cam Newton returned to the franchise after a one-year absence following an injury to starter Sam Darnold.

== Draft ==
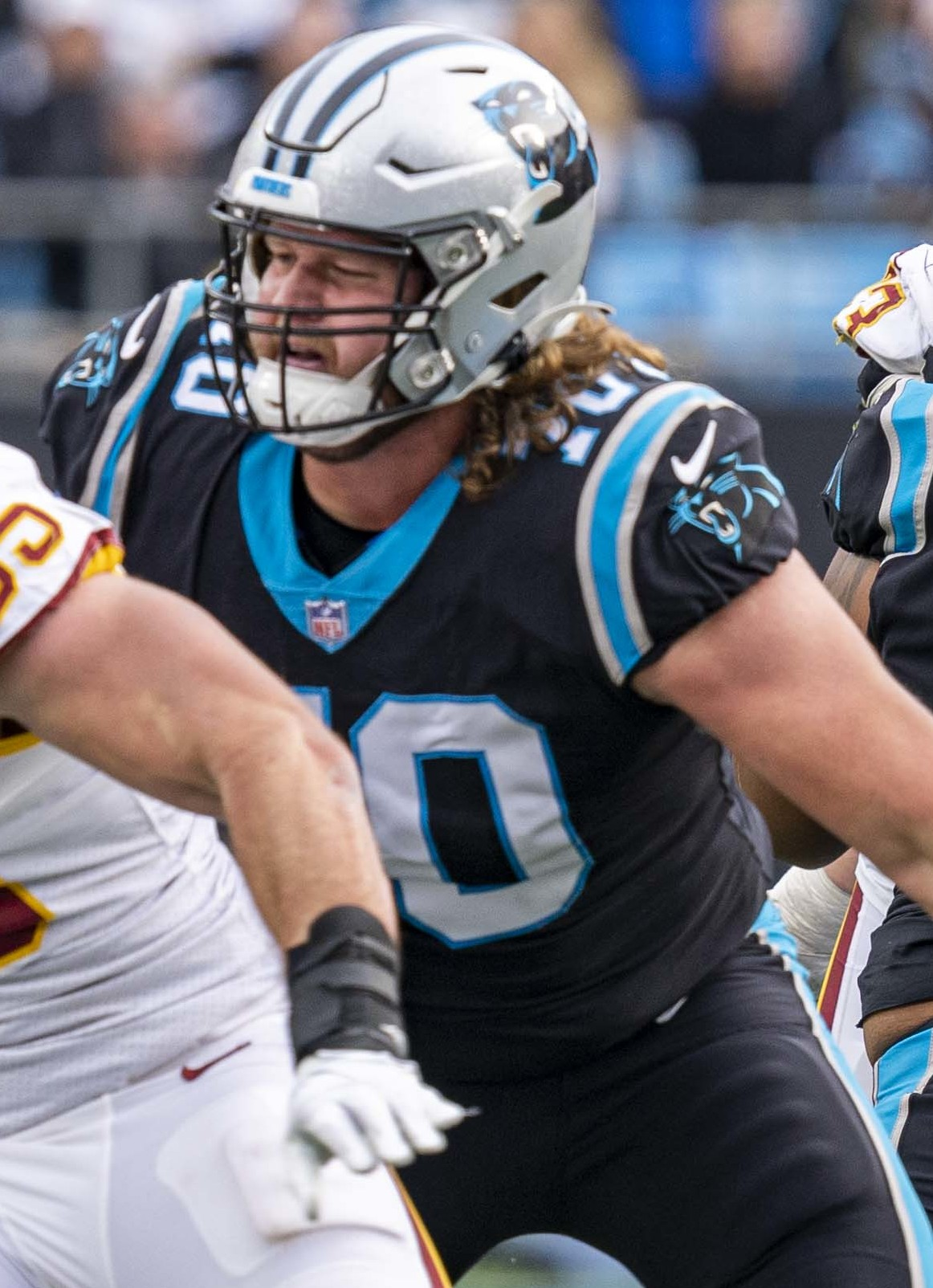
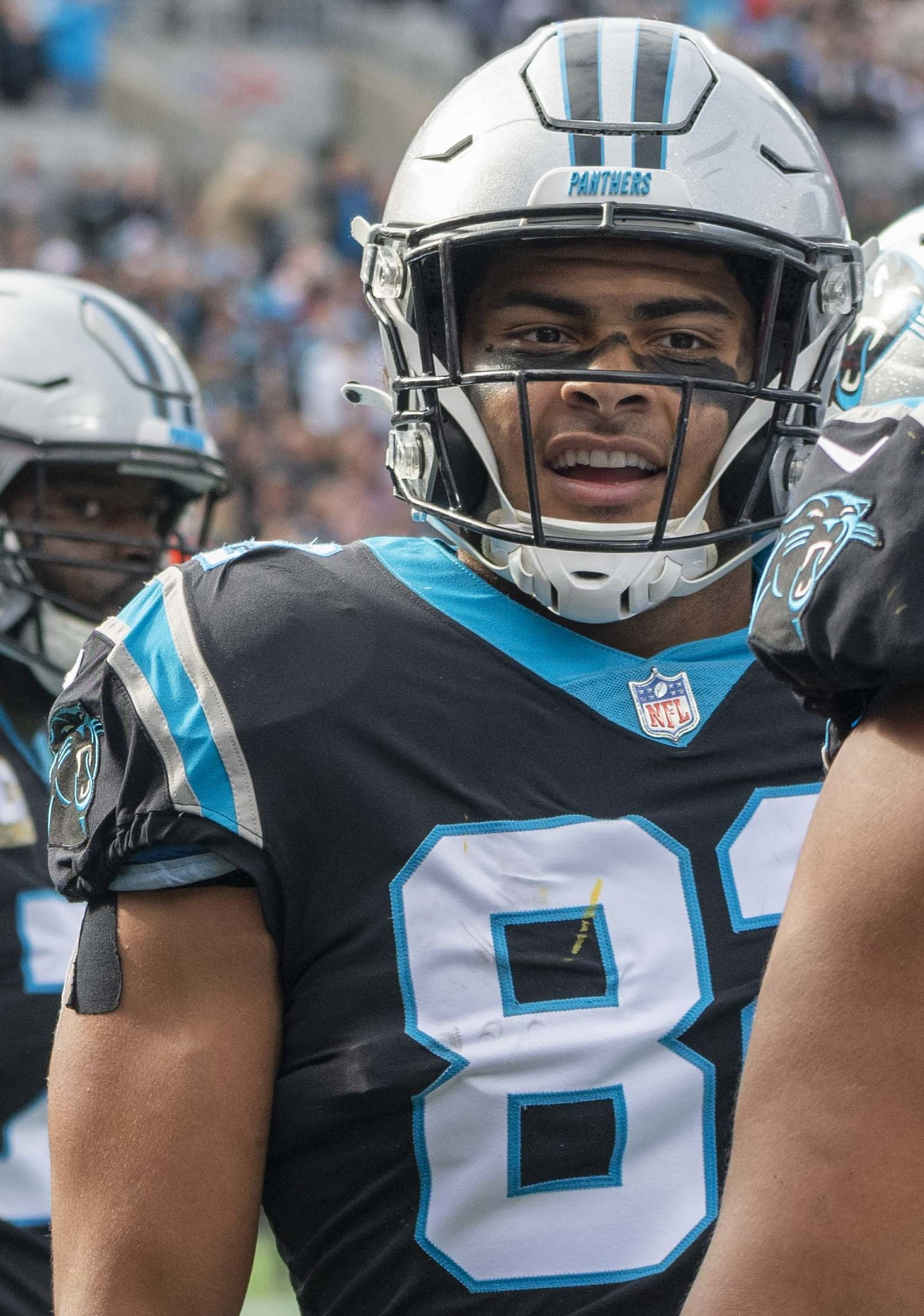
Third-round draft picks Brady Christensen (left) and Tommy Tremble

2021 Carolina Panthers Draft
Round	Selection	Player	Position	College
1	8	Jaycee Horn	CB	South Carolina
2	59	Terrace Marshall Jr.	WR	LSU
3	70	Brady Christensen	OT	BYU
3	83	Tommy Tremble	TE	Notre Dame
4	126	Chuba Hubbard	RB	Oklahoma State
5	158	Daviyon Nixon	DT	Iowa
5	166	Keith Taylor	CB	Washington
6	193	Deonte Brown	OG	Alabama
6	204	Shi Smith	WR	South Carolina
6	222	Thomas Fletcher	LS	Alabama
7	232	Phil Hoskins	DT	Kentucky

Draft trades

- Carolina traded their second- and fifth-round selection (39th and 151st overall) to Chicago in exchange for second-, third-, and sixth-round selections (52nd, 83rd, and 204th overall)
- Carolina traded their second- and fourth-round selections (52nd and 113th overall) to Cleveland in exchange for second- and third-round selections (59th and 89th overall).
- Carolina traded their third- and sixth-round selections (73rd and 191st overall) to Philadelphia for a third-round selection (70th overall)
- Carolina traded a third-round selection (89th overall) to Houston in exchange for fourth- and fifth-round selections (109th and 158th overall) and a 2022 fourth-round selection.
- Carolina traded a fourth-round selection (109th overall) to Tennessee in exchange for fourth-, fifth-, and seventh-round selections (126th, 166th, and 232nd overall).
- Carolina traded quarterback Teddy Bridgewater to Denver for their sixth-round selection (191st overall)
- Carolina traded a sixth-round selection (226th overall), 2022 second- and fourth-round selections to the New York Jets in exchange for quarterback Sam Darnold

== Staff ==
2021 Carolina Panthers staff
Front office: Owner – David Tepper; General manager – Scott Fitterer; Assistant general manager – Dan Morgan; Vice president of football operations & senior advisor to ownership – Steven Drummond; Vice president of player personnel – Pat Stewart; Senior personnel executive – Jeff Morrow; Director of football operations – Mike Anderson; Director of pro personnel – Matt Allen; Director of college scouting – Cole Spencer; Director of football analytics – Taylor Rajack; Head coaches: Head coach – Matt Rhule; Offensive coaches: Offensive coordinator – Joe Brady (fired mid season); Quarterbacks – Sean Ryan; Assistant quarterbacks – Matt Lombardi; Senior offensive assistant/running backs/interim offensive coordinator – Jeff Nixon; Wide receivers – Frisman Jackson; Tight ends – Brian Angelichio; Offensive line – Pat Meyer; Assistant offensive line – Tony Sparano Jr.	Defensive coaches: Defensive coordinator – Phil Snow; Defensive run game coordinator – Al Holcomb; Defensive line – Frank Okam; Linebackers – Mike Siravo; Defensive pass game coordinator/secondary – Jason Simmons; Cornerbacks – Evan Cooper; Defensive analyst – Kevin M. Gilbride; Special teams coaches: Special teams coordinator – Chase Blackburn; Assistant special teams – Ed Foley; Coaching assistants: Assistant to the head coach – Matthew Delgado; Coaching assistant – EJ Barthel; Coaching assistant – Garret McGuire; Coaching assistant – Grant Udinski; Coaching assistant – Cedric Whitaker; Strength and conditioning: Head athletic trainer – Kevin King; Strength and conditioning – Jeremy Scott; Assistant strength and conditioning – Thomas Barbeau

== Final roster ==
2021 Carolina Panthers roster
Quarterbacks (QB): 14 Sam Darnold; 1 Cam Newton; 6 P. J. Walker; Running backs (RB): 20 Ameer Abdullah; 30 Chuba Hubbard; 45 Giovanni Ricci; Wide receivers (WR): 11 Robby Anderson; 13 Alex Erickson; 2 D. J. Moore; 16 Brandon Zylstra; Tight ends (TE): 84 Stephen Sullivan; 80 Ian Thomas; 82 Tommy Tremble	Offensive linemen (OL): 77 Deonte Brown G; 70 Brady Christensen T; 65 Dennis Daley T/G; 60 Pat Elflein G/C; 73 Michael Jordan G; 67 John Miller G; 72 Taylor Moton T; 78 Trent Scott G/T; 68 Sam Tecklenburg C; Defensive linemen (DL): 95 Derrick Brown DT; 53 Brian Burns DE; 91 Morgan Fox DE; 92 Darryl Johnson DE; 90 DaQuan Jones DT; 93 Bravvion Roy DT; 48 Jacob Tuioti-Mariner DE	Linebackers (LB): 4 Jermaine Carter MLB; 98 Marquis Haynes OLB; 54 Azur Kamara OLB; 49 Frankie Luvu OLB; 47 Kamal Martin OLB; 43 Haason Reddick OLB; 50 Julian Stanford OLB; 54 Shaq Thompson OLB; Defensive backs (DB): 31 Juston Burris SS; 34 Sean Chandler SS; 21 Jeremy Chinn FS; 42 Sam Franklin Jr. SS; 38 Myles Hartsfield FS; 15 C. J. Henderson CB; 29 Rashaan Melvin CB; 27 Kenny Robinson FS; 28 Keith Taylor CB; 23 Stantley Thomas-Oliver III CB; Special teams (ST): 10 Lac Edwards P; 3 Lirim Hajrullahu K; 44 J. J. Jansen LS	Practice squad: 39 Reggie Bonnafon RB; 33 Spencer Brown RB; 17 Dominik Eberle K; 36 Madre Harper CB; 32 Tae Hayes CB; 69 Frank Herron DT; 66 Mike Horton G; 18 Keith Kirkwood WR; 96 Austin Larkin DE; 62 Aaron Monteiro T; 55 Damontre Moore DE; 19 Aaron Parker WR (PS/I); 74 Austen Pleasants T; 81 C. J. Saunders WR; 83 Willie Snead WR; 86 Colin Thompson TE; Reserve: 24 A. J. Bouye CB (IR); 75 Cameron Erving T (IR); 46 Thomas Fletcher LS (IR); 9 Stephon Gilmore CB (COVID-19); 5 Zane Gonzalez K (IR); 97 Yetur Gross-Matos DE (IR); 8 Jaycee Horn CB (IR); 71 Phil Hoskins DT (COVID-19); 26 Donte Jackson CB (IR); 88 Terrace Marshall Jr. WR (IR); 22 Christian McCaffrey RB (IR); 94 Daviyon Nixon DT; 61 Matt Paradis C (IR); 25 Troy Pride CB (IR); 12 Shi Smith WR (COVID-19); Rookies in italics 50 active, 15 reserve, 15 practice squad (1 exempt)

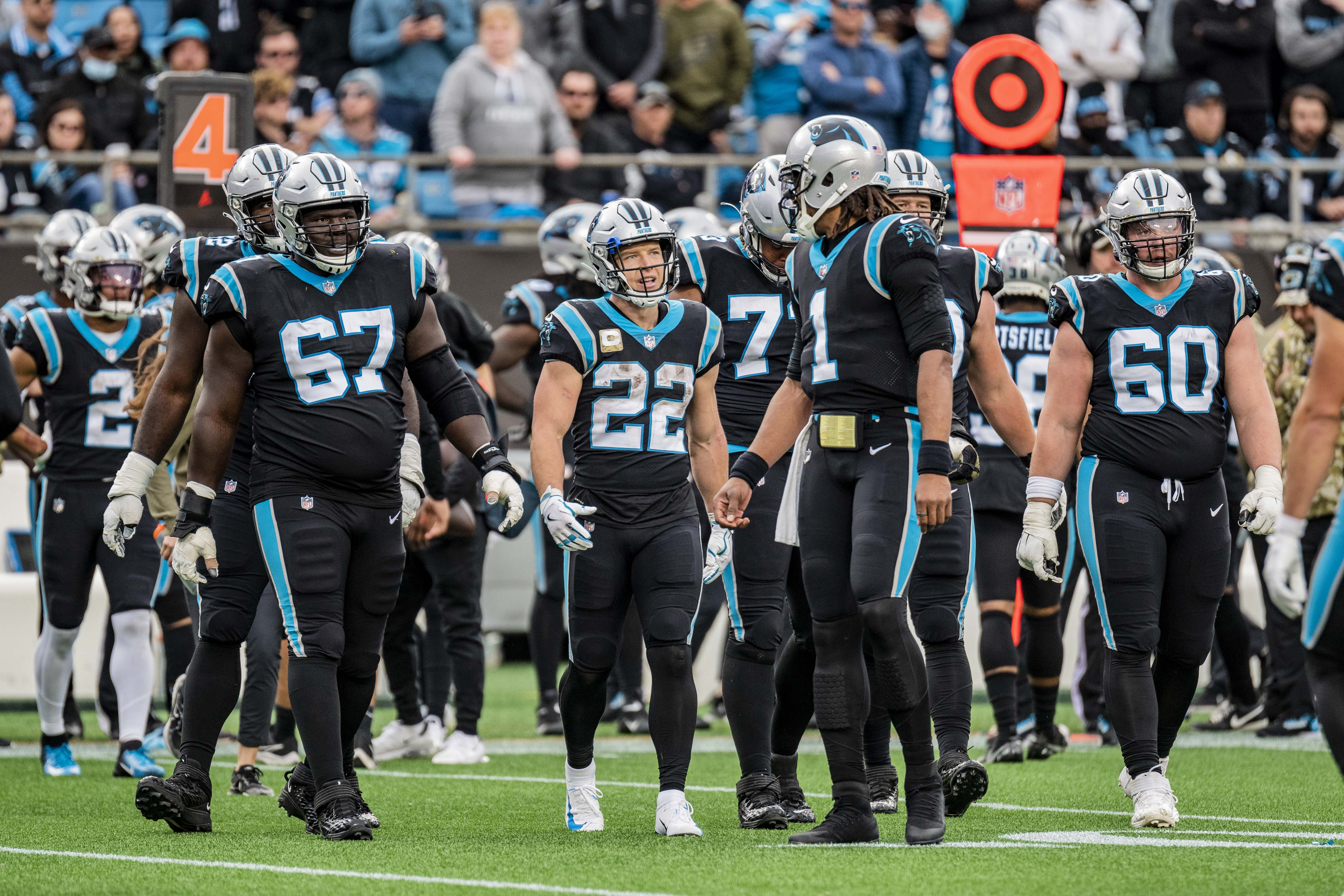
The Panthers offense, including quarterback Cam Newton (1), running back Christian McCaffrey (22), and linemen John Miller (67) and Pat Elflein (60), during the Week 11 game against the Washington Football Team

== Preseason ==
Week	Date	Opponent	Result	Record	Venue	Recap
1	August 15	at Indianapolis Colts	L 18–21	0–1	Lucas Oil Stadium	Recap
2	August 21	Baltimore Ravens	L 3–20	0–2	Bank of America Stadium	Recap
3	August 27	Pittsburgh Steelers	W 34–9	1–2	Bank of America Stadium	Recap

== Regular season ==
=== Schedule ===
Week	Date	Opponent	Result	Record	Venue	Recap
1	September 12	New York Jets	**W** 19–14	1–0	Bank of America Stadium	Recap
2	September 19	**New Orleans Saints**	**W** 26–7	2–0	Bank of America Stadium	Recap
3	September 23	at Houston Texans	**W** 24–9	3–0	NRG Stadium	Recap
4	October 3	at Dallas Cowboys	**L** 28–36	3–1	AT&T Stadium	Recap
5	October 10	Philadelphia Eagles	**L** 18–21	3–2	Bank of America Stadium	Recap
6	October 17	Minnesota Vikings	**L** 28–34 (OT)	3–3	Bank of America Stadium	Recap
7	October 24	at New York Giants	**L** 3–25	3–4	MetLife Stadium	Recap
8	October 31	at **Atlanta Falcons**	**W** 19–13	4–4	Mercedes-Benz Stadium	Recap
9	November 7	New England Patriots	**L** 6–24	4–5	Bank of America Stadium	Recap
10	November 14	at Arizona Cardinals	**W** 34–10	5–5	State Farm Stadium	Recap
11	November 21	Washington Football Team	**L** 21–27	5–6	Bank of America Stadium	Recap
12	November 28	at Miami Dolphins	**L** 10–33	5–7	Hard Rock Stadium	Recap
13	Bye					
14	December 12	**Atlanta Falcons**	**L** 21–29	5–8	Bank of America Stadium	Recap
15	December 19	at Buffalo Bills	**L** 14–31	5–9	Highmark Stadium	Recap
16	December 26	**Tampa Bay Buccaneers**	**L** 6–32	5–10	Bank of America Stadium	Recap
17	January 2	at **New Orleans Saints**	**L** 10–18	5–11	Caesars Superdome	Recap
18	January 9	at **Tampa Bay Buccaneers**	**L** 17–41	5–12	Raymond James Stadium	Recap

Note: Intra-division opponents are in bold text.

=== Game summaries ===
==== Week 1: vs. New York Jets ====
Week 1: New York Jets at Carolina Panthers – Game summary

Quarter	1	2	3	4	Total
Jets	0	0	8	6	**14**
**Panthers**	0	16	0	3	**19**

at Bank of America Stadium, Charlotte, North Carolina

- Date: September 12
- Game time: 1:00 p.m. EDT
- Game weather: Sunny, 84 °F (29 °C)
- Game attendance: 70,211
- Referee: Clay Martin
- TV announcers (CBS): Andrew Catalon, Tiki Barber, and Sherree Burruss
- Recap, Game Book

Game information

**First quarter**

- No scoring plays

**Second quarter**

- CAR – Ryan Santoso 22-yard field goal, 7:26. Panthers 3–0. **Drive: 6 plays, 29 yards, 2:00.**
- CAR – Robby Anderson 57-yard pass from Sam Darnold (kick failed, wide left), 4:06. Panthers 9–0. **Drive: 1 play, 57 yards, 0:08.**
- CAR – Sam Darnold 5-yard run (Ryan Santoso kick), 0:35. Panthers 16–0. **Drive: 7 plays, 62 yards, 2:00.**

**Third quarter**

- NYJ – Corey Davis 22-yard pass from Zach Wilson (Zach Wilson run), 1:25. Panthers 16–8. **Drive: 8 plays, 70 yards, 4:40.**

**Fourth quarter**

- CAR – Ryan Santoso 29-yard field goal, 8:42. Panthers 19–8. **Drive: 12 plays, 52 yards, 7:43.**
- NYJ – Corey Davis 8-yard pass from Zach Wilson (pass failed), 1:56. Panthers 19–14. **Drive: 10 plays, 93 yards, 2:31.**

**Top passers**

- NYJ – Zach Wilson – 20/37, 258 yards, 2 TD, INT
- CAR – Sam Darnold – 24/35, 279 yards, TD

**Top rushers**

- NYJ – Tevin Coleman – 9 rushes, 24 yards
- CAR – Christian McCaffrey – 21 rushes, 98 yards

**Top receivers**

- NYJ – Corey Davis – 5 receptions, 97 yards, 2 TD
- CAR – Christian McCaffrey – 9 receptions, 89 yards

In the Panthers' home and season opener against the New York Jets, quarterback Sam Darnold and wide receiver Robby Anderson faced their former team for the first time. Neither team scored in the first quarter. Early in the second quarter, as the Panthers attempted to convert on fourth down in the red zone, the football slipped out of Darnold's hands before he could hand it off to Christian McCaffrey, and the loose ball was recovered by the Jets' Sheldon Rankins. On the next drive, the Jets' rookie quarterback Zach Wilson tried to pass to Ryan Griffin but was intercepted by Shaq Thompson. From the turnover, Ryan Santoso kicked a 22-yard field goal for the Panthers. In the last five minutes of the first half, Carolina scored two touchdowns. Immediately after a Jets turnover on downs, Darnold found Anderson with a long pass for the first touchdown, but Santoso missed the extra point conversion wide left. Darnold then capped off the next Panthers drive by scoring on a five-yard run, and they went into halftime with a 16–0 lead. Late in the third quarter, the Jets finally scored when Wilson completed a touchdown pass to Corey Davis. Wilson then ran in on the ensuing two-point conversion to reduce the Panthers' lead to one score, but in the fourth quarter, Santoso converted a second field goal, increasing the Panthers' lead to 19–8. Right after the two-minute warning, Wilson connected with Davis again for a second touchdown, but his pass to Elijah Moore on the two-point conversion was deflected and fell short. With Jets kicker Matt Ammendola's onside kick going out of bounds, the Panthers retained possession for the remainder of the game and won 19–14 to begin the season at 1–0.

==== Week 2: vs. New Orleans Saints ====
Week 2: New Orleans Saints at Carolina Panthers – Game summary

Quarter	1	2	3	4	Total
Saints	0	0	0	7	**7**
**Panthers**	7	10	0	9	**26**

at Bank of America Stadium, Charlotte, North Carolina

- Date: September 19
- Game time: 1:00 p.m. EDT
- Game weather: Partly cloudy, 82 °F (28 °C)
- Game attendance: 70,675
- Referee: Ronald Torbert
- TV announcers (Fox): Chris Myers, Daryl Johnston, and Jen Hale
- Recap, Game Book

Game information

**First quarter**

- CAR – Brandon Zylstra 20-yard pass from Sam Darnold (Zane Gonzalez kick), 12:00. Panthers 7–0. **Drive: 5 plays, 75 yards, 3:00.**

**Second quarter**

- CAR – Zane Gonzalez 20-yard field goal, 11:11. Panthers 10–0. **Drive: 15 plays, 64 yards, 8:57.**
- CAR – D. J. Moore 2-yard pass from Sam Darnold (Zane Gonzalez kick), 1:55. Panthers 17–0. **Drive: 10 plays, 72 yards, 5:30.**

**Third quarter**

- No scoring plays

**Fourth quarter**

- NO – Jameis Winston 8-yard run (Aldrick Rosas kick), 14:37. Panthers 17–7. **Drive: 5 plays, 18 yards, 1:57.**
- CAR – Christian McCaffrey 11-yard run (kick failed, wide left), 5:53. Panthers 23–7. **Drive: 7 plays, 53 yards, 2:49.**
- CAR – Zane Gonzalez 42-yard field goal, 3:21. Panthers 26–7. **Drive: 4 plays, 8 yards, 1:07.**

**Top passers**

- NO – Jameis Winston – 11/22, 111 yards, 2 INT
- CAR – Sam Darnold – 26/38, 305 yards, 2 TD, INT

**Top rushers**

- NO – Jameis Winston – 3 rushes, 19 yards, TD
- CAR – Christian McCaffrey – 24 rushes, 72 yards, TD

**Top receivers**

- NO – Lil'Jordan Humphrey – 1 reception, 27 yards
- CAR – D. J. Moore – 8 receptions, 79 yards, TD

In the first quarter, the Panthers opened the scoring when Sam Darnold threw a touchdown pass to Brandon Zylstra on the opening drive, with newly signed kicker Zane Gonzalez converting the extra point conversion. Gonzalez then made a field goal early in the second quarter, increasing the Panthers' lead to 10. On the next Panthers drive, Darnold recorded his second touchdown of the game, finding D. J. Moore with a two-yard pass in the end zone. In the final minute of the quarter, Jameis Winston scrambled out of the pocket and launched a long pass downfield intended for Deonte Harris, but the pass fell short and was intercepted by Juston Burris. With the interception, the Panthers completed their first-half shutout of the Saints and went into halftime with a 17–0 lead. The third quarter was scoreless; the Panthers came closest to scoring, but a 50-yard field goal attempt from Gonzalez was blocked by Carl Granderson and recovered by the Saints' Zack Baun. With less than two minutes to go in the third quarter, as P. J. Williams about to sack him, Darnold attempted a shovel pass that fell to Malcolm Roach for an interception, the only Panthers turnover of the game. The Saints capitalized on the mistake, as Jameis Winston capped off the ensuing drive early in the fourth quarter with an eight-yard run for the Saints' only touchdown of the game. The Panthers once again increased their lead with an 11-yard touchdown run from Christian McCaffrey. Gonzalez missed the extra point conversion wide left but converted a 42-yard field goal following a Saints turnover on downs. In the final minutes of the game, Winston once again scrambled to avoid getting sacked before throwing a long pass downfield; his overthrown pass intended for Juwan Johnson resulted in his second interception of the game, this time at the hands of rookie Jaycee Horn. The Panthers' 26–7 victory improved their record to 2–0.

==== Week 3: at Houston Texans ====
Week 3: Carolina Panthers at Houston Texans – Game summary

Quarter	1	2	3	4	Total
**Panthers**	7	0	7	10	**24**
Texans	0	6	0	3	**9**

at NRG Stadium, Houston, Texas

- Date: September 23
- Game time: 8:20 p.m. EDT/7:20 p.m. CDT
- Game weather: None (retractable roof closed)
- Game attendance: 68,320
- Referee: Alex Kemp
- TV announcers (NFLN): Joe Buck, Troy Aikman, Erin Andrews, and Kristina Pink
- Recap, Game Book

Game information

**First quarter**

- CAR – Sam Darnold 5-yard run (Zane Gonzalez kick), 6:36. Panthers 7–0. **Drive: 10 plays, 88 yards, 6:00.**

**Second quarter**

- HOU – Anthony Miller 1-yard pass from Davis Mills (kick failed, wide right), 0:25. Panthers 7–6. **Drive: 7 plays, 64 yards, 1:12.**

**Third quarter**

- CAR – Tommy Tremble 7-yard run (Zane Gonzalez kick), 6:20. Panthers 14–6. **Drive: 9 plays, 91 yards, 4:17.**

**Fourth quarter**

- CAR – Zane Gonzalez 21-yard field goal, 12:44. Panthers 17–6. **Drive: 10 plays, 56 yards, 6:31.**
- HOU – Joey Slye 53-yard field goal, 9:09. Panthers 17–9. **Drive: 8 plays, 40 yards, 3:35.**
- CAR – Sam Darnold 1-yard run (Zane Gonzalez kick), 4:07. Panthers 24–9. **Drive: 12 plays, 75 yards, 5:02.**

**Top passers**

- CAR – Sam Darnold – 23/34, 304 yards
- HOU – Davis Mills – 19/28, 168 yards, TD

**Top rushers**

- CAR – Chuba Hubbard – 11 rushes, 52 yards
- HOU – Mark Ingram II – 6 rushes, 21 yards

**Top receivers**

- CAR – D. J. Moore – 8 receptions, 126 yards
- HOU – Brandin Cooks – 9 receptions, 112 yards

A five-yard touchdown run from Sam Darnold in the first quarter gave the Panthers the early lead. Just before halftime, Davis Mills found Anthony Miller with a short pass for a Texans touchdown, but former Panthers kicker Joey Slye missed the extra point conversion wide right, preventing the Texans from drawing level. In the third quarter, the Panthers extended their lead, as Tommy Tremble scored a touchdown off of an end-around run. In doing so, Tremble became the youngest tight end to score a rushing touchdown in NFL history; the last tight end to score a rushing touchdown at age 22 or younger was Rob Gronkowski, who did so for the New England Patriots in Week 13 of the 2011 season against the Indianapolis Colts. With a one-score game heading into the fourth quarter, the teams traded field goals before the Panthers secured the win with a quarterback sneak from Darnold for his second rushing touchdown of the game. With the 24–9 win, the Panthers began the season with three consecutive wins for the first time since the 2015 season.

==== Week 4: at Dallas Cowboys ====
Week 4: Carolina Panthers at Dallas Cowboys – Game summary

Quarter	1	2	3	4	Total
Panthers	7	7	0	14	**28**
**Cowboys**	7	6	20	3	**36**

at AT&T Stadium, Arlington, Texas

- Date: October 3
- Game time: 1:00 p.m. EDT/12:00 p.m. CDT
- Game weather: None (retractable roof closed)
- Game attendance: 93,262
- Referee: Jerome Boger
- TV announcers (Fox): Kevin Burkhardt, Greg Olsen, and Pam Oliver
- Recap, Game Book

Game information

**First quarter**

- DAL – Ezekiel Elliott 1-yard run (Greg Zuerlein kick), 7:27. Cowboys 7–0. **Drive: 9 plays, 70 yards, 4:40.**
- CAR – Sam Darnold 1-yard run (Zane Gonzalez kick), 2:41. Tied 7–7. **Drive: 9 plays, 75 yards, 4:46.**

**Second quarter**

- DAL – Blake Jarwin 18-yard pass from Dak Prescott (pass failed), 14:09. Cowboys 13–7. **Drive: 9 plays, 75 yards, 3:32.**
- CAR – Sam Darnold 11-yard run (Zane Gonzalez kick), 7:02. Panthers 14–13. **Drive: 13 plays, 75 yards, 7:07.**

**Third quarter**

- DAL – Amari Cooper 35-yard pass from Dak Prescott (Greg Zuerlein kick), 10:49. Cowboys 20–14. **Drive: 4 plays, 56 yards, 2:00.**
- DAL – Dalton Schultz 6-yard pass from Dak Prescott (pass failed), 7:21. Cowboys 26–14. **Drive: 4 plays, 66 yards, 1:49.**
- DAL – Cedrick Wilson Jr. 23-yard pass from Dak Prescott (Greg Zuerlein kick), 2:17. Cowboys 33–14. **Drive: 3 plays, 37 yards, 1:20.**

**Fourth quarter**

- DAL – Greg Zuerlein 37-yard field goal, 14:56. Cowboys 36–14. **Drive: 4 plays, 9 yards, 1:26.**
- CAR – D. J. Moore 6-yard pass from Sam Darnold (Zane Gonzalez kick), 8:58. Cowboys 36–21. **Drive: 10 plays, 75 yards, 5:58.**
- CAR – D. J. Moore 8-yard pass from Sam Darnold (Zane Gonzalez kick), 4:31. Cowboys 36–28. **Drive: 7 plays, 80 yards, 2:18.**

**Top passers**

- CAR – Sam Darnold – 26/39, 301 yards, 2 TD, 2 INT
- DAL – Dak Prescott – 14/22, 188 yards, 4 TD

**Top rushers**

- CAR – Chuba Hubbard – 13 rushes, 57 yards
- DAL – Ezekiel Elliott – 20 rushes, 143 yards, TD

**Top receivers**

- CAR – D. J. Moore – 8 receptions, 113 yards, 2 TD
- DAL – Amari Cooper – 3 receptions, 69 yards, TD

Both teams scored one-yard rushing touchdowns in the first quarter, with Ezekiel Elliott scoring first for the Cowboys before Sam Darnold scored for the Panthers. On the extra point conversion after Dak Prescott's touchdown pass to Blake Jarwin, the Panthers were penalized for having too many players on the field, and the line of scrimmage was moved to the one-yard line. On the ensuing two-point conversion, Prescott threw to Dalton Schultz, who was initially ruled to have successfully scored. However, upon further review, Schultz was tackled just short of the goal line by Jeremy Chinn and the tip of the football had not broken the plane of the end zone by the time Schultz's knee was down. On the next drive, Darnold scored his second rushing touchdown of the game. With the touchdown, his fifth rushing touchdown of the season, Darnold became the NFL's sole leader in rushing touchdowns on the season; he also became the first quarterback in NFL history to reach that mark in the first four games of the season. The Panthers led 14–13 at halftime, but the Cowboys dominated the third quarter and pulled ahead. After the Panthers' opening drive of the second half ended with Zane Gonzalez missing a 54-yard field goal attempt wide left, Prescott threw for touchdowns on all three of the Cowboys' third-quarter drives, finding Amari Cooper, Schultz, and Cedrick Wilson Jr., respectively. The Cowboys tried another two-point conversion after Schultz's touchdown, but Prescott's pass to CeeDee Lamb was too high. The Cowboys defense also contributed, with rookie Trevon Diggs intercepting Darnold on back-to-back Panthers drives sandwiching the Cowboys' third touchdown drive of the quarter; Diggs also became a league leader with five interceptions on the season up to that point. From the second Diggs interception, the Cowboys opened the fourth quarter with a 37-yard field goal from Greg Zuerlein, increasing their lead further to 36–14. The Panthers countered with a pair of touchdowns from Darnold to D. J. Moore to reduce the deficit to eight points, but the Cowboys retained possession for the rest of the game and won 36–28. The loss was the Panthers' first of the season, and it left the Arizona Cardinals and the Las Vegas Raiders as the only remaining undefeated teams, though the Raiders would lose as well the following day.

==== Week 5: vs. Philadelphia Eagles ====
Week 5: Philadelphia Eagles at Carolina Panthers – Game summary

Quarter	1	2	3	4	Total
**Eagles**	3	3	7	8	**21**
Panthers	10	5	0	3	**18**

at Bank of America Stadium, Charlotte, North Carolina

- Date: October 10
- Game time: 1:00 p.m. EDT
- Game weather: Sunny, 77 °F (25 °C)
- Game attendance: 72,545
- Referee: Shawn Hochuli
- TV announcers (Fox): Joe Davis, Greg Olsen, and Pam Oliver
- Recap, Game Book

Game information

**First quarter**

- CAR – Zane Gonzalez 48-yard field goal, 11:12. Panthers 3–0. **Drive: 8 plays, 32 yards, 2:27.**
- PHI – Jake Elliott 30-yard field goal, 6:47. Tied 3–3. **Drive: 4 plays, 2 yards, 2:15.**
- CAR – Tommy Tremble 5-yard pass from Sam Darnold (Zane Gonzalez kick), 3:09. Panthers 10–3. **Drive: 9 plays, 62 yards, 3:38.**

**Second quarter**

- CAR – Zane Gonzalez 43-yard field goal, 2:39. Panthers 13–3. **Drive: 6 plays, 15 yards, 3:12.**
- CAR – Jalen Hurts fumble out of bounds in end zone for a safety, 2:26. Panthers 15–3.
- PHI – Jake Elliott 58-yard field goal, 0:00. Panthers 15–6. **Drive: 5 plays, 44 yards, 0:31.**

**Third quarter**

- PHI – Jalen Hurts 1-yard run (Jake Elliott kick), 0:08. Panthers 15–13. **Drive: 6 plays, 80 yards, 2:19.**

**Fourth quarter**

- CAR – Zane Gonzalez 50-yard field goal, 8:29. Panthers 18–13. **Drive: 11 plays, 44 yards, 6:39.**
- PHI – Jalen Hurts 6-yard run (Jalen Hurts–DeVonta Smith pass), 2:38. Eagles 21–18. **Drive: 4 plays, 27 yards, 1:15.**

**Top passers**

- PHI – Jalen Hurts – 22/37, 198 yards, INT
- CAR – Sam Darnold – 21/37, 177 yards, TD, 3 INT

**Top rushers**

- PHI – Miles Sanders – 11 rushes, 45 yards
- CAR – Chuba Hubbard – 24 rushes, 101 yards

**Top receivers**

- PHI – DeVonta Smith – 7 receptions, 77 yards
- CAR – D. J. Moore – 5 receptions, 42 yards

After the 1–3 Eagles went three-and-out to start the game, the Panthers scored first with a 48-yard field goal from Zane Gonzalez. However, on the next Panthers drive, an underthrown pass from Sam Darnold intended for D. J. Moore was intercepted by Darius Slay, who advanced the ball to the ten-yard line. Despite starting from inside the red zone, the Eagles were unable to take full advantage of the turnover; they settled for a Jake Elliott field goal after a touchdown pass from Jalen Hurts to DeVonta Smith on fourth-and-goal was disallowed due to an offensive pass interference penalty on Greg Ward. The Panthers then countered with a touchdown pass from Darnold to rookie Tommy Tremble, the first receiving touchdown of the latter's NFL career. After a series of unsuccessful drives ending in punts from both teams, the Panthers increased their lead with a field goal from Gonzalez late in the second quarter. On the next play after the kickoff return, a high snap ricocheted off of Hurts' right hand and into the end zone; despite the attempts of several Panthers players to gain possession of the football, none of them could before Hurts batted the ball out of the end zone to minimize the consequences of the Eagles' mistake from a touchdown to a safety. After forcing a quick three-and-out from the Panthers, the Eagles drove down the field and ended the first half with a 58-yard field goal from Elliott, with the score at halftime being 15–6. The second half was filled with turnovers from both teams. After the Panthers punted on the opening drive of the second half, Hurts completed a pass to DeVonta Smith before Donte Jackson knocked the ball out of Smith's hands, with the fumble recovered by Jeremy Chinn. After the Panthers were unable to capitalize on the turnover, two interceptions followed in quick succession. On the next Eagles offensive play, Hurts overthrew Zach Ertz on a long pass down the left sideline and was intercepted by Jackson, who managed to keep both feet inbounds. Then, Slay stepped in front of Moore to once again intercept Darnold. Just before the end of the third quarter, the Eagles reduced the Panthers' lead to two points with Hurts scoring on a quarterback sneak, but a third Panthers field goal increased the lead back up to five points. In the fourth quarter, T. J. Edwards ran unimpeded through the punt formation and blocked a Joseph Charlton punt, which was recovered by Shaun Bradley. On the ensuing drive after the blocked punt, the Eagles took the lead with under three minutes left, with Hurts scoring his second rushing touchdown of the game before making the two-point conversion with a pass to Smith. The Panthers' attempt to retake the lead resulted in Darnold's third intercepted pass of the game, this time by Steven Nelson, who stepped in front of Robby Anderson. With the Eagles closing out the game, the Panthers lost 21–18, their second loss in a row after starting the season with three wins.

==== Week 6: vs. Minnesota Vikings ====
Week 6: Minnesota Vikings at Carolina Panthers – Game summary

Quarter	1	2	3	4	OT	Total
**Vikings**	6	6	13	3	6	**34**
Panthers	7	3	7	11	0	**28**

at Bank of America Stadium, Charlotte, North Carolina

- Date: October 17
- Game time: 1:00 p.m. EDT
- Game weather: Sunny, 63 °F (17 °C)
- Game attendance: 72,104
- Referee: Craig Wrolstad
- TV announcers (Fox): Kenny Albert, Jonathan Vilma, and Sara Walsh
- Recap, Game Book

Game information

**First quarter**

- MIN – Greg Joseph 25-yard field goal, 11:52. Vikings 3–0. **Drive: 7 plays, 16 yards, 2:56.**
- CAR – Chuba Hubbard 2-yard run (Zane Gonzalez kick), 8:27. Panthers 7–3. **Drive: 2 plays, 18 yards, 0:42.**
- MIN – Greg Joseph 25-yard field goal, 2:57. Panthers 7–6. **Drive: 11 plays, 46 yards, 5:30.**

**Second quarter**

- MIN – Chris Herndon 2-yard pass from Kirk Cousins (run failed), 10:59. Vikings 12–7. **Drive: 9 plays, 85 yards, 4:08.**
- CAR – Zane Gonzalez 47-yard field goal, 4:20. Vikings 12–10. **Drive: 10 plays, 32 yards, 4:23.**

**Third quarter**

- CAR – Kenny Robinson 4-yard return of blocked punt (Zane Gonzalez kick), 6:49. Panthers 17–12.
- MIN – Dalvin Cook 16-yard run (pass failed), 4:00. Vikings 18–17. **Drive: 5 plays, 79 yards, 2:49.**
- MIN – Adam Thielen 5-yard pass from Kirk Cousins (Greg Joseph kick), 2:24. Vikings 25–17. **Drive: 4 plays, 39 yards, 1:27.**

**Fourth quarter**

- MIN – Greg Joseph 38-yard field goal, 10:15. Vikings 28–17. **Drive: 8 plays, 63 yards, 4:37.**
- CAR – Zane Gonzalez 23-yard field goal, 4:41. Vikings 28–20. **Drive: 7 plays, 55 yards, 2:19.**
- CAR – Robby Anderson 7-yard pass from Sam Darnold (Sam Darnold–Tommy Tremble pass), 0:42. Tied 28–28. **Drive: 11 plays, 96 yards, 1:27.**

**Overtime**

- MIN – K. J. Osborn 27-yard pass from Kirk Cousins, 5:48. Vikings 34–28. **Drive: 9 plays, 75 yards, 4:12.**

**Top passers**

- MIN – Kirk Cousins – 33/48, 373 yards, 3 TD
- CAR – Sam Darnold – 17/41, 207 yards, TD, INT

**Top rushers**

- MIN – Dalvin Cook – 29 rushes, 140 yards, TD
- CAR – Chuba Hubbard – 16 rushes, 61 yards, TD

**Top receivers**

- MIN – Adam Thielen – 11 receptions, 126 yards, TD
- CAR – D. J. Moore – 5 receptions, 73 yards

On the game's first play from scrimmage, Bashaud Breeland dove in front of Robby Anderson to intercept Sam Darnold, from which the Vikings scored with Greg Joseph converting a 25-yard field goal. After Kirk Cousins passed to Justin Jefferson, A. J. Bouye forced a fumble, which was recovered and advanced by Haason Reddick. From the turnover, Shi Smith ran 16 yards on the shovel pass from Sam Darnold before Chuba Hubbard scored a rushing touchdown. Joseph added another 25-yard field goal to close the deficit to one point before the Vikings regained the lead early in the second quarter with a touchdown pass from Cousins to Chris Herndon. The Vikings were unsuccessful on the two-point conversion, as Bouye tripped up Dalvin Cook before the latter could reach the goal line. The Panthers added a field goal from Zane Gonzalez later in the quarter, and the score was 12–10 in favor of the Vikings at halftime. On the second Vikings drive of the third quarter, Frankie Luvu ran through the middle of the punt formation and blocked a Jordan Berry punt, which was recovered by Kenny Robinson and returned for a Panthers touchdown. The Vikings then countered with touchdowns on consecutive possessions. First, Cook scored on a 16-yard run after the initial ruling that he was down at the one-yard line was overturned; the two-point conversion was once again unsuccessful, as Jefferson was unable to stay inbounds to catch a pass from Cousins. On the next Panthers play from scrimmage, D. J. Moore received a pass from Darnold and was tackled by Xavier Woods, who stripped away the football, which was subsequently recovered by Eric Kendricks. The Vikings once again capitalized on the Panthers turnover, with Cousins passing to Adam Thielen for a touchdown. Following a third Vikings field goal, Darnold lost the ball while being sacked by Armon Watts and Everson Griffen, and the loose ball was recovered by Dalvin Tomlinson, but the Vikings were unable to convert this turnover into points. After converting three field goals already, Joseph missed a 50-yard attempt wide right before Gonzalez converted a 23-yard field goal to narrow the deficit to eight points. After a Berry punt was downed at the four-yard line, Darnold recorded three straight incompletions before converting on fourth down with a 41-yard pass to Ian Thomas. The Panthers, having driven almost the entire length of the field in under 90 seconds, completed the drive with Darnold's first touchdown of the game on a seven-yard pass to Anderson. Tommy Tremble then converted the two-point conversion with a shovel pass from Darnold to tie the game at 28–28. Despite there only being 42 seconds left in the game, the Vikings advanced the ball to within field goal range, but Joseph missed wide right once again from 47 yards out on what could have been the game-winning field goal. In overtime, the Vikings won the coin toss and elected to receive; on their first possession, K. J. Osborn scored on a 27-yard touchdown pass from Cousins to win the game. This was the Panthers' third consecutive loss after winning their first three games of the season, and they remained winless after key players Christian McCaffrey and Jaycee Horn both picked up injuries during the Week 3 game against the Houston Texans.

==== Week 7: at New York Giants ====
Week 7: Carolina Panthers at New York Giants – Game summary

Quarter	1	2	3	4	Total
Panthers	3	0	0	0	**3**
**Giants**	0	5	7	13	**25**

at MetLife Stadium, East Rutherford, New Jersey

- Date: October 24
- Game time: 1:00 p.m. EDT
- Game weather: Mostly cloudy, 57 °F (14 °C)
- Game attendance: 71,899
- Referee: Carl Cheffers
- TV announcers (Fox): Adam Amin, Mark Schlereth, and Shannon Spake
- Recap, Game Book

Game information

**First quarter**

- CAR – Zane Gonzalez 45-yard field goal, 8:37. Panthers 3–0. **Drive: 13 plays, 46 yards, 6:23.**

**Second quarter**

- NYG – Penalty on Sam Darnold enforced in end zone for a safety, 14:53. Panthers 3–2.
- NYG – Graham Gano 49-yard field goal, 12:53. Giants 5–3. **Drive: 6 plays, 32 yards, 2:00.**

**Third quarter**

- NYG – Dante Pettis 5-yard pass from Daniel Jones (Graham Gano kick), 0:59. Giants 12–3. **Drive: 11 plays, 75 yards, 6:33.**

**Fourth quarter**

- NYG – Graham Gano 53-yard field goal, 12:41. Giants 15–3. **Drive: 6 plays, 19 yards, 2:10.**
- NYG – Graham Gano 44-yard field goal, 5:54. Giants 18–3. **Drive: 10 plays, 32 yards, 5:32.**
- NYG – Devontae Booker 19-yard run (Graham Gano kick), 4:46. Giants 25–3. **Drive: 1 play, 19 yards, 0:06.**

**Top passers**

- CAR – Sam Darnold – 16/25, 111 yards, INT
- NYG – Daniel Jones – 23/33, 203 yards, TD

**Top rushers**

- CAR – Chuba Hubbard – 12 rushes, 28 yards
- NYG – Devontae Booker – 14 rushes, 51 yards, TD

**Top receivers**

- CAR – D. J. Moore – 6 receptions, 73 yards
- NYG – Darius Slayton – 5 receptions, 63 yards

On the Panthers' opening drive, Zane Gonzalez kicked a 45-yard field goal, which went in off the left upright, to give the Panthers the early lead and their only points of the game. After the Giants were unable to convert on fourth-and-goal from the two-yard line, the Panthers received the ball. After having only advanced the ball one yard in total on the first two downs, the Panthers faced third-and-nine to begin the second quarter. In the face of the Giants' oncoming blitz, Sam Darnold threw the ball away, but because the throw did not pass the line of scrimmage and was not in the vicinity of any eligible receivers, Darnold was penalized for intentional grounding, which resulted in a Giants safety given the field position. On the ensuing drive, former Panthers kicker Graham Gano converted a 49-yard field goal to give the Giants a 5–3 lead. Later in the quarter, after Darnold completed five passes consecutively on the same drive, his pass intended for Ian Thomas was intercepted by former Panther James Bradberry in the red zone. The Giants were unable to capitalize on the turnover but retained a two-point lead at halftime. Towards the end of the third quarter, Dante Pettis completed a 16-yard pass to Jones on a trick play, with the same drive culminating with a five-yard touchdown pass from Jones to Pettis. After a run of poor performances, Panthers head coach Matt Rhule benched Darnold, with P. J. Walker taking over at quarterback for the fourth quarter. Meanwhile, the Giants continued to extend their lead, with Gano adding two more field goals. A pair of Panthers turnovers on downs late in the fourth quarter sandwiched Devontae Booker's rushing touchdown to cap off the 25–3 loss, the Panthers' fourth in a row.

==== Week 8: at Atlanta Falcons ====
Week 8: Carolina Panthers at Atlanta Falcons – Game summary

Quarter	1	2	3	4	Total
**Panthers**	3	6	3	7	**19**
Falcons	3	7	0	3	**13**

at Mercedes-Benz Stadium, Atlanta, Georgia

- Date: October 31
- Game time: 1:00 p.m. EDT
- Game weather: Cloudy, 58 °F (14 °C) (retractable roof open)
- Game attendance: 68,583
- Referee: Brad Allen
- TV announcers (Fox): Kevin Kugler, Mark Sanchez, and Laura Okmin
- Recap, Game Book

Game information

**First quarter**

- ATL – Younghoe Koo 46-yard field goal, 13:30. Falcons 3–0. **Drive: 4 plays, 2 yards, 1:26.**
- CAR – Zane Gonzalez 29-yard field goal, 6:13. Tied 3–3. **Drive: 15 plays, 64 yards, 7:17.**

**Second quarter**

- ATL – Cordarrelle Patterson 15-yard pass from Matt Ryan (Younghoe Koo kick), 13:58. Falcons 10–3. **Drive: 8 plays, 61 yards, 4:23.**
- CAR – Zane Gonzalez 51-yard field goal, 9:13. Falcons 10–6. **Drive: 8 plays, 42 yards, 4:45.**
- CAR – Zane Gonzalez 57-yard field goal, 0:00. Falcons 10–9. **Drive: 5 plays, 34 yards, 0:24.**

**Third quarter**

- CAR – Zane Gonzalez 23-yard field goal, 3:33. Panthers 12–10. **Drive: 16 plays, 78 yards, 8:42.**

**Fourth quarter**

- CAR – Chuba Hubbard 6-yard run (Zane Gonzalez kick), 6:30. Panthers 19–10. **Drive: 15 plays, 65 yards, 7:40.**
- ATL – Younghoe Koo 53-yard field goal, 0:16. Panthers 19–13. **Drive: 2 plays, 25 yards, 0:34.**

**Top passers**

- CAR – Sam Darnold – 13/24, 129 yards
- ATL – Matt Ryan – 20/27, 146 yards, TD, 2 INT

**Top rushers**

- CAR – Chuba Hubbard – 24 rushes, 82 yards, TD
- ATL – Mike Davis – 9 rushes, 44 yards

**Top receivers**

- CAR – D. J. Moore – 4 receptions, 59 yards
- ATL – Tajae Sharpe – 5 receptions, 58 yards

On the opening play from scrimmage, Deion Jones tackled Chuba Hubbard for a two-yard loss and knocked the ball out, with Adetokunbo Ogundeji recovering the fumble. Younghoe Koo converted the turnover into the game's first points with a field goal before Zane Gonzalez converted for the Panthers. The Falcons retook the lead on a touchdown pass from Matt Ryan to Cordarrelle Patterson early in the second quarter. After Gonzalez converted a second field goal, Ryan's pass intended for Hayden Hurst was intercepted by Shaq Thompson. The Panthers were unable to capitalize on the interception but Gonzalez added a 57-yard field goal on the last play of the first half, leaving them down by one point at halftime. On the only Panthers drive of the third quarter, which lasted almost nine minutes, Gonzalez added a fourth field goal, giving the Panthers their first lead of the game. Early in the fourth quarter, Koo missed a 45-yard field goal attempt wide right before Hubbard's rushing touchdown increased the Panthers' lead. On that touchdown drive, Sam Darnold sustained a hard hit from Foyesade Oluokun on an eight-yard scramble and, having already been hit hard by Jones on the previous play's scramble, had to leave the game with a concussion; P. J. Walker filled in at quarterback for the rest of the game. After Stephon Gilmore stepped in front of Kyle Pitts to intercept Ryan, the Panthers looked to close out the game but were forced to punt with under a minute left. Thirty-four seconds later, Koo added a 53-yard field goal, but his subsequent onside kick was recovered by Robby Anderson. With the 19–13 victory, the Panthers stopped their four-game losing streak and improved to 4–4. Meanwhile, Gonzalez's four successful field goals resulted in him winning his first NFC Special Teams Player of the Week award.

==== Week 9: vs. New England Patriots ====
Week 9: New England Patriots at Carolina Panthers – Game summary

Quarter	1	2	3	4	Total
**Patriots**	0	14	10	0	**24**
Panthers	0	6	0	0	**6**

at Bank of America Stadium, Charlotte, North Carolina

- Date: November 7
- Game time: 1:00 p.m. EST
- Game weather: Sunny, 61 °F (16 °C)
- Game attendance: 72,203
- Referee: Clete Blakeman
- TV announcers (CBS): Greg Gumbel, Adam Archuleta, and AJ Ross
- Recap, Game Book

Game information

**First quarter**

- No scoring plays

**Second quarter**

- CAR – Zane Gonzalez 39-yard field goal, 12:07. Panthers 3–0. **Drive: 7 plays, 12 yards, 3:23.**
- NE – Damien Harris 3-yard run (Nick Folk kick), 8:19. Patriots 7–3. **Drive: 8 plays, 75 yards, 3:48.**
- CAR – Zane Gonzalez 49-yard field goal, 4:28. Patriots 7–6. **Drive: 6 plays, 3 yards, 1:54.**
- NE – Hunter Henry 7-yard pass from Mac Jones (Nick Folk kick), 0:24. Patriots 14–6. **Drive: 10 plays, 75 yards, 4:04.**

**Third quarter**

- NE – J. C. Jackson 88-yard interception return (Nick Folk kick), 6:55. Patriots 21–6.
- NE – Nick Folk 37-yard field goal, 2:20. Patriots 24–6. **Drive: 6 plays, 24 yards, 1:44.**

**Fourth quarter**

- No scoring plays

**Top passers**

- NE – Mac Jones – 12/18, 139 yards, TD, INT
- CAR – Sam Darnold – 16/33, 172 yards, 3 INT

**Top rushers**

- NE – Rhamondre Stevenson – 10 rushes, 62 yards
- CAR – Christian McCaffrey – 14 rushes, 52 yards

**Top receivers**

- NE – Rhamondre Stevenson – 2 receptions, 44 yards
- CAR – Christian McCaffrey – 4 receptions, 54 yards

Both teams entered the game with identical 4–4 records. In the last minute of the first quarter, Brian Burns strip-sacked Mac Jones, with the ball being recovered by Frankie Luvu; on the ensuing drive, Zane Gonzalez converted a 39-yard field goal. Damien Harris then scored on a three-yard run. Later in the second quarter, Stephon Gilmore, who had been traded from the Patriots on October 6, intercepted Jones on a pass intended for Jakobi Meyers; from this, Gonzalez converted another field goal. With 24 seconds left in the half, Jones completed a touchdown pass to Hunter Henry. In the second half, Sam Darnold threw interceptions on three consecutive Panthers drives. The first of these came when Darnold, who was being chased down by Matthew Judon and Christian Barmore, overthrew Ian Thomas, with J. C. Jackson returning the interception for a touchdown. Jamie Collins recorded the second interception, jumping up at the line of scrimmage to grab a pass intended for Robby Anderson. After the Panthers drove into the red zone early in the fourth quarter, Darnold was once again intercepted by Jackson, who was covering D. J. Moore in the end zone. From these turnovers, Nick Folk added to the Patriots' lead with a 37-yard field goal after Collins's interception but missed a 54-yard attempt wide right after Jackson's second interception. The 24–6 loss dropped the Panthers to 4–5.

==== Week 10: at Arizona Cardinals ====
Week 10: Carolina Panthers at Arizona Cardinals – Game summary

Quarter	1	2	3	4	Total
**Panthers**	17	6	8	3	**34**
Cardinals	0	0	3	7	**10**

at State Farm Stadium, Glendale, Arizona

- Date: November 14
- Game time: 4:05 p.m. EST/2:05 p.m. MST
- Game weather: None (retractable roof closed)
- Game attendance: 62,400
- Referee: Adrian Hill
- TV announcers (Fox): Kenny Albert, Jonathan Vilma, and Sara Walsh
- Recap, Game Book

Game information

**First quarter**

- CAR – Cam Newton 2-yard run (Zane Gonzalez kick), 11:12. Panthers 7–0. **Drive: 5 plays, 15 yards, 2:22.**
- CAR – Robby Anderson 2-yard pass from Cam Newton (Zane Gonzalez kick), 8:39. Panthers 14–0. **Drive: 4 plays, 41 yards, 1:12.**
- CAR – Zane Gonzalez 44-yard field goal, 1:00. Panthers 17–0. **Drive: 9 plays, 40 yards, 5:25.**

**Second quarter**

- CAR – Zane Gonzalez 48-yard field goal, 9:40. Panthers 20–0. **Drive: 10 plays, 51 yards, 5:09.**
- CAR – Zane Gonzalez 49-yard field goal, 0:00. Panthers 23–0. **Drive: 12 plays, 53 yards, 3:16.**

**Third quarter**

- ARI – Matt Prater 47-yard field goal, 10:02. Panthers 23–3. **Drive: 7 plays, 46 yards, 2:45.**
- CAR – Chuba Hubbard 5-yard run (P. J. Walker–Terrace Marshall Jr. pass), 5:34. Panthers 31–3. **Drive: 8 plays, 75 yards, 4:28.**

**Fourth quarter**

- ARI – James Conner 11-yard run (Matt Prater kick), 9:19. Panthers 31–10. **Drive: 11 plays, 71 yards, 4:33.**
- CAR – Zane Gonzalez 27-yard field goal, 3:26. Panthers 34–10. **Drive: 10 plays, 36 yards, 5:53.**

**Top passers**

- CAR – P. J. Walker – 22/29, 167 yards, INT
- ARI – Colt McCoy – 11/20, 107 yards, INT

**Top rushers**

- CAR – Christian McCaffrey – 13 rushes, 95 yards
- ARI – James Conner – 10 rushes, 39 yards, TD

**Top receivers**

- CAR – Christian McCaffrey – 10 receptions, 66 yards
- ARI – Christian Kirk – 7 receptions, 58 yards

In his first game back after re-signing with the Panthers, Cam Newton was expected to receive limited playing action, while P. J. Walker remained as the starting quarterback. Meanwhile, the 8–1 Cardinals were without several key players on offense, including quarterback Kyler Murray and wide receiver DeAndre Hopkins. On the game's opening drive, Colt McCoy was strip-sacked by Haason Reddick, with the fumble recovered by Morgan Fox. From the turnover, Newton scored a two-yard touchdown run on his first snap of the game. After McCoy was unable to convert a quarterback sneak on fourth-and-one, resulting in a turnover on downs, Newton scored his second touchdown in as many snaps, with a two-yard pass to Robby Anderson. McCoy committed his second turnover of the first quarter, as an overthrown pass intended for Antoine Wesley was intercepted by Donte Jackson. The Panthers continued to increase their lead, with Zane Gonzalez converting a field goal on the ensuing drive before adding another field goal in the second quarter. Jalen Thompson then intercepted an overthrown pass from Walker intended for Terrace Marshall Jr., but the Cardinals were forced into a three-and-out and had to punt on their third consecutive drive. Gonzalez closed out the first half with a 49-yard field goal, completing the Panthers' 23–0 shutout of the Cardinals in the half. After the Panthers were forced to punt for the first time in the game on the opening drive of the second half, Matt Prater kicked a 47-yard field goal for the Cardinals' first points of the game. Chuba Hubbard then scored a rushing touchdown, with Walker completing a pass to Marshall for the two-point conversion. After McCoy sustained a chest injury (later clarified to be a pectoral injury) on a sack by Shaq Thompson, he left the game and was replaced by Chris Streveler. Streveler was involved in a pair of Cardinals turnover on downs, the first one coming after he was sacked by Fox and Reddick, and the second one after he fumbled the snap, which was recovered by Eno Benjamin but was advanced no further; these instances sandwiched a botched handoff between Walker and Hubbard that was recovered by Zach Allen. After James Conner scored on an 11-yard rush in the fourth quarter, Gonzalez capped off the Panthers' 34–10 victory with his fourth field goal of the game. While the other three NFC South teams lost their respective Week 10 games, the Panthers picked up a vital underdog victory and improved to 5–5, matching their win total from each of the previous two seasons. Additionally, Gonzalez's perfect kicking conversion rate won him the first NFC Special Teams Player of the Week award again.

==== Week 11: vs. Washington Football Team ====
Week 11: Washington Football Team at Carolina Panthers – Game summary

Quarter	1	2	3	4	Total
**Washington**	0	14	7	6	**27**
Panthers	7	7	0	7	**21**

at Bank of America Stadium, Charlotte, North Carolina

- Date: November 21
- Game time: 1:00 p.m. EST
- Game weather: Partly cloudy, 58 °F (14 °C)
- Game attendance: 73,350
- Referee: Bill Vinovich
- TV announcers (Fox): Kevin Kugler, Mark Sanchez and Laura Okmin
- Recap, Game Book

Game information

**First quarter**

- CAR – D. J. Moore 10-yard pass from Cam Newton (Zane Gonzalez kick), 9:32. Panthers 7–0. **Drive: 9 plays, 75 yards, 5:28.**

**Second quarter**

- WAS – Cam Sims 6-yard pass from Taylor Heinicke (Joey Slye kick), 13:29. Tied 7–7. **Drive: 7 plays, 66 yards, 2:56.**
- CAR – Cam Newton 24-yard run (Zane Gonzalez kick), 5:52. Panthers 14–7. **Drive: 5 plays, 70 yards, 2:33.**
- WAS – Terry McLaurin 12-yard pass from Taylor Heinicke (Joey Slye kick), 0:09. Tied 14–14. **Drive: 12 plays, 71 yards, 5:43.**

**Third quarter**

- WAS – DeAndre Carter 4-yard pass from Taylor Heinicke (Joey Slye kick), 9:21. Football Team 21–14. **Drive: 10 plays, 66 yards, 5:39.**

**Fourth quarter**

- CAR – Christian McCaffrey 27-yard pass from Cam Newton (Zane Gonzalez kick), 10:44. Tied 21–21. **Drive: 7 plays, 91 yards, 4:09.**
- WAS – Joey Slye 36-yard field goal, 4:13. Football Team 24–21. **Drive: 12 plays, 58 yards, 6:31.**
- WAS – Joey Slye 29-yard field goal, 1:50. Football Team 27–21. **Drive: 5 plays, 23 yards, 1:03.**

**Top passers**

- WAS – Taylor Heinicke – 16/22, 206 yards, 3 TD
- CAR – Cam Newton – 21/27, 189 yards, 2 TD

**Top rushers**

- WAS – Antonio Gibson – 19 rushes, 95 yards
- CAR – Christian McCaffrey – 10 rushes, 59 yards

**Top receivers**

- WAS – Terry McLaurin – 5 receptions, 103 yards, TD
- CAR – Christian McCaffrey – 7 receptions, 60 yards, TD

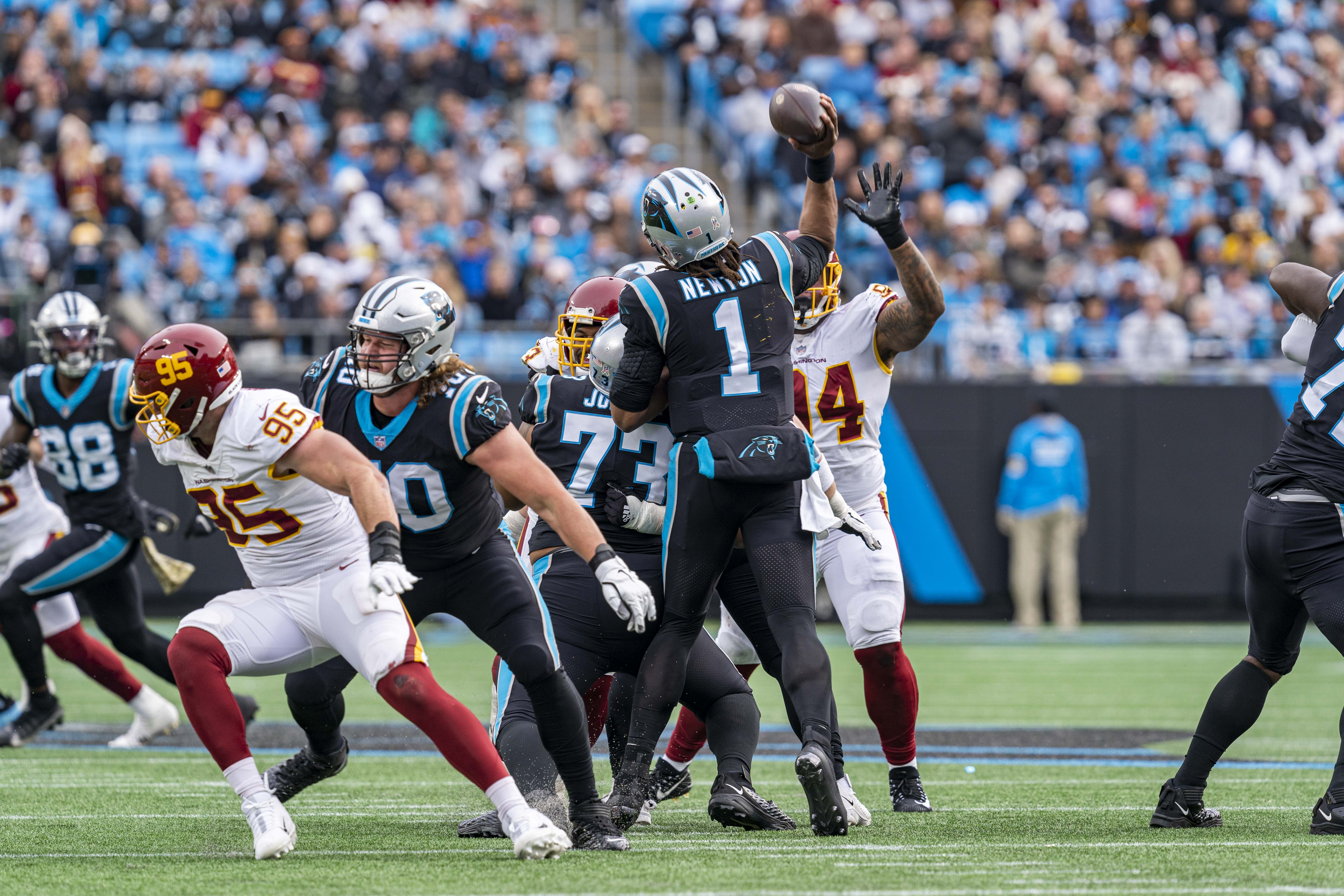
Newton about to throw a pass

Ahead of the game, Cam Newton was named as the starter over P. J. Walker. The Panthers scored first as Newton completed a pass to D. J. Moore for a touchdown on the opening drive. Later in the first quarter, Antonio Gibson fumbled the ball while being tackled by Morgan Fox, with Frankie Luvu recovering the loose ball, but the Panthers were unable to capitalize. Early in the second quarter, Washington, led by former Panthers head coach Ron Rivera and former Panthers quarterback Taylor Heinicke, drew even with Heinicke passing to Cam Sims for a touchdown. After Newton scored on a 25-yard touchdown run, Julian Stanford forced a fumble from DeAndre Carter on the ensuing kickoff return. However, Troy Apke was able to recover the ball for Washington, and they rebounded with a touchdown pass from Heinicke to Terry McLaurin with 14 seconds left in the first half. Washington then took the lead on the opening drive of the second half as Heinicke scored his third passing touchdown of the game, finding Carter in the end zone. The Panthers equalized early in the fourth quarter with a touchdown pass from Newton to Christian McCaffrey, but former Panthers kicker Joey Slye, who had played against the Panthers earlier in the season as a member of the Houston Texans, kicked two field goals in the final five minutes. This proved to be the difference, and the Panthers lost 27–21.

==== Week 12: at Miami Dolphins ====
Week 12: Carolina Panthers at Miami Dolphins – Game summary

Quarter	1	2	3	4	Total
Panthers	7	3	0	0	**10**
**Dolphins**	7	14	6	6	**33**

at Hard Rock Stadium, Miami Gardens, Florida

- Date: November 28
- Game time: 1:00 p.m. EST
- Game weather: Mostly sunny, 77 °F (25 °C)
- Game attendance: 62,389
- Referee: John Hussey
- TV announcers (Fox): Chris Myers, Daryl Johnston, and Jen Hale
- Recap, Game Book

Game information

**First quarter**

- MIA – Justin Coleman 2-yard return of blocked punt (Jason Sanders kick), 9:11. Dolphins 7–0.
- CAR – Cam Newton 1-yard run (Zane Gonzalez kick), 6:01. Tied 7–7. **Drive: 6 plays, 75 yards, 3:10.**

**Second quarter**

- MIA – Jaylen Waddle 9-yard pass from Tua Tagovailoa (Jason Sanders kick), 9:01. Dolphins 14–7. **Drive: 3 plays, 9 yards, 1:26.**
- MIA – Myles Gaskin 3-yard run (Jason Sanders kick), 4:26. Dolphins 21–7. **Drive: 6 plays, 73 yards, 2:53.**
- CAR – Zane Gonzalez 41-yard field goal, 0:00. Dolphins 21–10. **Drive: 1 play, 0 yards, 0:01.**

**Third quarter**

- MIA – Myles Gaskin 3-yard run (kick failed, hit left upright), 4:11. Dolphins 27–10. **Drive: 13 plays, 80 yards, 7:24.**

**Fourth quarter**

- MIA – Jason Sanders 46-yard field goal, 10:58. Dolphins 30–10. **Drive: 10 plays, 19 yards, 6:34.**
- MIA – Jason Sanders 33-yard field goal, 3:41. Dolphins 33–10. **Drive: 10 plays, 23 yards, 5:22.**

**Top passers**

- CAR – Cam Newton – 5/21, 92 yards, 2 INT
- MIA – Tua Tagovailoa – 27/31, 230 yards, TD

**Top rushers**

- CAR – Christian McCaffrey – 10 rushes, 35 yards
- MIA – Myles Gaskin – 16 rushes, 49 yards, 2 TD

**Top receivers**

- CAR – D. J. Moore – 4 receptions, 103 yards
- MIA – Jaylen Waddle – 9 receptions, 137 yards, TD

After Duke Riley blocked a punt from Lachlan Edwards, Justin Coleman recovered the ball and was pushed into the end zone for the opening score. On the next drive, Cam Newton scored a one-yard touchdown run on his second effort with help from right guard Trent Scott after initially being stopped at the line of scrimmage. Early in the second quarter, Newton threw a pair of interceptions on back-to-back Panthers drives. The first one was to Jevon Holland on an underthrown pass intended for Robby Anderson, while the second one was to Xavien Howard on a pass intended for Moore. From the Howard interception, Tua Tagovailoa passed to Jaylen Waddle for a touchdown. The Dolphins scored their third touchdown of the first half as Myles Gaskin took a direct snap from the wildcat formation and ran in from three yards out. In the final minute of the first half, the Dolphins were driving down the field in an attempt to further increase their lead before halftime, but a botched snap from Austin Reiter to Tagovailoa with 12 seconds left was recovered by Frankie Luvu. As Luvu attempted to return the fumble recovery, he was tackled by Isaiah Ford with one second left, allowing Zane Gonzalez to kick a 41-yard field goal to end the first half. The Panthers successfully executed a fake punt on the opening drive of the second half, with Sean Chandler taking the direct snap from long snapper J. J. Jansen and running 14 yards for the first down, but the drive still ended in a punt later. Gaskin then added his second rushing touchdown of the game, which also came from a direct snap three yards out. Jason Sanders hit the left upright on the ensuing extra point conversion but later added two field goals to secure Miami's lead. Meanwhile, Newton was benched after his poor performance and was replaced by P. J. Walker for the fourth quarter. However, on his first drive of the game, Walker was forced to scramble out of the pocket and his underthrown pass intended for Ian Thomas was intercepted by Nik Needham, leading to the second of Sanders' field goals. A late Panthers drive to try and narrow the deficit was unsuccessful, and the 33–10 loss dropped them to 5–7 ahead of their bye week.

==== Week 14: vs. Atlanta Falcons ====
Week 14: Atlanta Falcons at Carolina Panthers – Game summary

Quarter	1	2	3	4	Total
**Falcons**	7	10	3	9	**29**
Panthers	7	0	7	7	**21**

at Bank of America Stadium, Charlotte, North Carolina

- Date: December 12
- Game time: 1:00 p.m. EST
- Game weather: Sunny, 51 °F (11 °C)
- Game attendance: 72,243
- Referee: Shawn Smith
- TV announcers (Fox): Kenny Albert, Jonathan Vilma, and Lindsay Czarniak
- Recap, Game Book

Game information

**First quarter**

- CAR – Cam Newton 12-yard run (Zane Gonzalez kick), 8:19. Panthers 7–0. **Drive: 9 plays, 65 yards, 4:19.**
- ATL – Cordarrelle Patterson 5-yard run (Younghoe Koo kick), 3:03. Tied 7–7. **Drive: 11 plays, 75 yards, 5:16.**

**Second quarter**

- ATL – Mykal Walker 66-yard interception run (Younghoe Koo kick), 8:35. Falcons 14–7.
- ATL – Younghoe Koo 32-yard field goal, 3:12. Falcons 17–7. **Drive: 9 plays, 38 yards, 3:52.**

**Third quarter**

- CAR – Chuba Hubbard 17-yard run (Zane Gonzalez kick), 11:21. Falcons 17–14. **Drive: 8 plays, 60 yards, 3:39.**
- ATL – Younghoe Koo 38-yard field goal, 6:28. Falcons 20–14. **Drive: 9 plays, 55 yards, 4:53.**

**Fourth quarter**

- ATL – Hayden Hurst 3-yard pass from Matt Ryan (pass failed), 14:17. Falcons 26–14. **Drive: 10 plays, 49 yards, 5:23.**
- ATL – Younghoe Koo 48-yard field goal, 6:10. Falcons 29–14. **Drive: 6 plays, 18 yards, 3:45.**
- CAR – Robby Anderson 5-yard pass from P. J. Walker (Zane Gonzalez kick), 3:11. Falcons 29–21. **Drive: 6 plays, 51 yards, 1:38.**

**Top passers**

- ATL – Matt Ryan – 19/28, 190 yards, TD
- CAR – Cam Newton – 15/23, 178 yards, INT

**Top rushers**

- ATL – Cordarrelle Patterson – 16 rushes, 58 yards, TD
- CAR – Cam Newton – 10 rushes, 47 yards, TD

**Top receivers**

- ATL – Russell Gage – 4 receptions, 64 yards
- CAR – Robby Anderson – 7 receptions, 84 yards, TD

The Panthers and the Falcons, both entering the game at 5–7, played each other for the second time this season, with the Panthers winning the first game 19–13 in Week 8. Cam Newton and Cordarrelle Patterson both scored rushing touchdowns for their respective teams in the first quarter. In the second quarter, Mykal Walker intercepted a pass from Newton intended for Ameer Abdullah and returned it 66 yards for a touchdown, before the Falcons bolstered their lead with a field goal from Younghoe Koo. For the second game in a row, Newton was replaced by P. J. Walker, albeit temporarily, as Walker was more familiar with the Panthers' two-minute offensive playbook, according to head coach Matt Rhule. However, Walker's first drive ended with an interception by A. J. Terrell on a pass intended for Robby Anderson. The Falcons were unable to capitalize on the turnover but retained a 17–7 lead at halftime. Newton returned to the game in the second half, and from the opening drive, Chuba Hubbard rushed for a touchdown before Koo kicked another field goal. With under five minutes left in the third quarter, Newton stumbled while attempting a handoff to Hubbard and fumbled the ball, which was recovered by Grady Jarrett. From this, Matt Ryan completed a touchdown pass to Hayden Hurst early in the fourth quarter, but the former was then unable to find an open receiver on the ensuing two-point conversion, which failed. Two consecutive Panthers drives ended in turnovers on downs, with the first one resulting in Koo's third field goal. Immediately following the second turnover on downs, Qadree Ollison was tackled by DaQuan Jones and fumbled the ball, which was recovered by Jermaine Carter. The Panthers closed the deficit to eight points as Walker completed a five-yard touchdown pass to Anderson, but the Falcons were able to retain possession for the rest of the game and win 29–21.

==== Week 15: at Buffalo Bills ====
Week 15: Carolina Panthers at Buffalo Bills – Game summary

Quarter	1	2	3	4	Total
Panthers	0	8	0	6	**14**
**Bills**	0	17	7	7	**31**

at Highmark Stadium, Orchard Park, New York

- Date: December 19
- Game time: 1:00 p.m. EST
- Game weather: Cloudy, 29 °F (−2 °C)
- Game attendance: 65,398
- Referee: Clete Blakeman
- TV announcers (Fox): Kenny Albert, Jonathan Vilma, and Lindsay Czarniak
- Recap, Game Book

Game information

**First quarter**

- No scoring plays

**Second quarter**

- BUF – Devin Singletary 16-yard run (Tyler Bass kick), 14:13. Bills 7–0. **Drive: 6 plays, 50 yards, 2:48.**
- BUF – Stefon Diggs 11-yard pass from Josh Allen (Tyler Bass kick), 9:41. Bills 14–0. **Drive: 5 plays, 57 yards, 2:36.**
- CAR – Cam Newton 4-yard run (Cam Newton–D. J. Moore pass), 1:48. Bills 14–8. **Drive: 3 plays, 37 yards, 0:57.**
- BUF – Tyler Bass 26-yard field goal, 0:00. Bills 17–8. **Drive: 11 plays, 63 yards, 1:48.**

**Third quarter**

- BUF – Gabe Davis 20-yard pass from Josh Allen (Tyler Bass kick), 5:52. Bills 24–8. **Drive: 10 plays, 74 yards, 3:42.**

**Fourth quarter**

- CAR – Ameer Abdullah 23-yard pass from Cam Newton (run failed), 11:01. Bills 24–14. **Drive: 4 plays, 43 yards, 1:22.**
- BUF – Gabe Davis 14-yard pass from Josh Allen (Tyler Bass kick), 2:07. Bills 31–14. **Drive: 9 plays, 46 yards, 4:04.**

**Top passers**

- CAR – Cam Newton – 18/38, 156 yards, TD, INT
- BUF – Josh Allen – 19/34, 210 yards, 3 TD, INT

**Top rushers**

- CAR – Cam Newton – 15 rushes, 71 yards, TD
- BUF – Devin Singletary – 22 rushes, 86 yards, TD

**Top receivers**

- CAR – D. J. Moore – 6 receptions, 48 yards
- BUF – Gabe Davis – 5 receptions, 85 yards, 2 TD

In Week 15, the Panthers faced the Buffalo Bills, a team that had several former notable Panthers coaches and players. These included head coach Sean McDermott (a former Panthers defensive coordinator), offensive lineman Daryl Williams, linebacker A. J. Klein, and defensive linemen Mario Addison, Efe Obada, Star Lotulelei, and Vernon Butler; Williams, Klein, Lotulelei, and Butler had all been drafted by the Panthers. After Panthers kicker Zane Gonzalez injured suffered a right quad injury during pre-game warmups, the Panthers were forced to convert on fourth down in situations where field goals would have been a possible option, while wide receiver Brandon Zylstra handled kickoff duties. Neither team was able to score in the first quarter, although the Panthers were unable to convert on fourth down within field goal range. Early in the second quarter, Devin Singletary scored on a 16-yard run before the Bills doubled their lead with an touchdown pass from Josh Allen to Stefon Diggs. Jeremy Chinn's interception on a pass from Allen intended for Diggs gave the Panthers possession late in the first half. From this, Cam Newton scored on a four-yard run before completing a pass to D. J. Moore for the two-point conversion. With under two minutes left in the half, the Bills were still able to drive within field goal range, with Tyler Bass converting from 26 yards as time expired, and the Bills led at halftime 17–8. Allen's 20-yard touchdown pass to Gabe Davis was the only scoring play in the third quarter. In the fourth quarter, Ameer Abdullah scored on a 23-yard touchdown pass from Newton, but on the ensuing two-point conversation, the latter's rush attempt was stopped short by Tremaine Edmunds. After Allen completed a second touchdown to Davis, Klein intercepted a pass from Newton intended for Terrace Marshall Jr. to close out the Bills' 31–14 win.

==== Week 16: vs. Tampa Bay Buccaneers ====
Week 16: Tampa Bay Buccaneers at Carolina Panthers – Game summary

Quarter	1	2	3	4	Total
**Buccaneers**	7	12	10	3	**32**
Panthers	3	3	0	0	**6**

at Bank of America Stadium, Charlotte, North Carolina

- Date: December 26
- Game time: 1:00 p.m. EST
- Game weather: Sunny, 73 °F (23 °C)
- Game attendance: 71,918
- Referee: Brad Allen
- TV announcers (Fox): Kevin Kugler, Mark Sanchez, and Laura Okmin
- Recap, Game Book

Game information

**First quarter**

- CAR – Lirim Hajrullahu 24-yard field goal, 7:17. Panthers 3–0. **Drive: 9 plays, 64 yards, 5:04.**
- TB – Ke'Shawn Vaughn 55-yard run (Ryan Succop kick), 4:13. Buccaneers 7–3. **Drive: 5 plays, 75 yards, 3:04.**

**Second quarter**

- TB – Ryan Succop 36-yard field goal, 10:54. Buccaneers 10–3. **Drive: 10 plays, 33 yards, 5:47.**
- CAR – Lirim Hajrullahu 29-yard field goal, 7:20. Buccaneers 10–6. **Drive: 6 plays, 64 yards, 3:34.**
- TB – Ryan Succop 43-yard field goal, 2:40. Buccaneers 13–6. **Drive: 9 plays, 50 yards, 4:40.**
- TB – Cameron Brate 4-yard pass from Tom Brady (pass failed), 1:19. Buccaneers 19–6. **Drive: 4 plays, 69 yards, 0:22.**

**Third quarter**

- TB – Ryan Succop 21-yard field goal, 8:34. Buccaneers 22–6. **Drive: 9 plays, 51 yards, 3:56.**
- TB – Ronald Jones II 7-yard run (Ryan Succop kick), 2:08. Buccaneers 29–6. **Drive: 7 plays, 57 yards, 4:17.**

**Fourth quarter**

- TB – Ryan Succop 48-yard field goal, 7:59. Buccaneers 32–6. **Drive: 5 plays, 15 yards, 1:50.**

**Top passers**

- TB – Tom Brady – 18/30, 232 yards, TD
- CAR – Sam Darnold – 15/32, 190 yards

**Top rushers**

- TB – Ke'Shawn Vaughn – 7 rushes, 70 yards, TD
- CAR – Cam Newton – 5 rushes, 42 yards

**Top receivers**

- TB – Antonio Brown – 10 receptions, 101 yards
- CAR – Shi Smith – 3 receptions, 86 yards

The Panthers faced the Tampa Bay Buccaneers in the first of three divisional games to finish the season. Although Sam Darnold returned from injured reserve and was expected to receive some playing time, Cam Newton remained the starting quarterback. On the Panthers' opening drive, the Panthers settled for a first career field goal from newly signed kicker Lirim Hajrullahu, who filled in for the still-injured Zane Gonzalez. Ke'Shawn Vaughn then scored on a 55-yard run to give the Buccaneers the lead. Near the end of the first quarter, an underthrown pass from Newton under pressure that was intended for Tommy Tremble was tipped by Shaquil Barrett and intercepted by Jordan Whitehead. In the second quarter, a pair of field goals from Ryan Succop sandwiched one from Hajrullahu. On the drive resulting in Hajrullahu's field goal, Darnold began to share snaps with Newton before taking over completely by the end of the third quarter. With under two minutes left in the first half, Tom Brady completed a touchdown pass to Cameron Brate but threw incomplete to Tyler Johnson on the two-point conversion that followed, though the Buccaneers still held a 19–6 lead at halftime. In the third quarter, the Buccaneers increased their lead with a third Succop field goal and a rushing touchdown from Ronald Jones II, before Succop added a fourth field goal in the fourth quarter. On the final drive of the game, the Panthers drove down to the six-yard line but were unable to score. With the Minnesota Vikings losing to the Los Angeles Rams, the 32–6 result allowed the Buccaneers to win the division and clinch a playoff spot; meanwhile, the Panthers were eliminated from playoff contention for the fourth consecutive season.

==== Week 17: at New Orleans Saints ====
Week 17: Carolina Panthers at New Orleans Saints – Game summary

Quarter	1	2	3	4	Total
Panthers	3	7	0	0	**10**
**Saints**	3	6	3	6	**18**

at Caesars Superdome, New Orleans, Louisiana

- Date: January 2
- Game time: 4:25 p.m. EST/3:25 p.m. CST
- Game weather: None (indoor stadium)
- Game attendance: 69,170
- Referee: Jerome Boger
- TV announcers (Fox): Brandon Gaudin, Matt Millen, and Sarah Kustok
- Recap, Game Book

Game information

**First quarter**

- CAR – Lirim Hajrullahu 32-yard field goal, 8:05. Panthers 3–0. **Drive: 12 plays, 61 yards, 6:55.**
- NO – Brett Maher 41-yard field goal, 4:05. Tied 3–3. **Drive: 8 plays, 52 yards, 4:00.**

**Second quarter**

- CAR – Chuba Hubbard 21-yard run (Lirim Hajrullahu kick), 13:09. Panthers 10–3. **Drive: 10 plays, 81 yards, 5:56.**
- NO – Brett Maher 27-yard field goal, 8:41. Panthers 10–6. **Drive: 4 plays, 4 yards, 1:25.**
- NO – Brett Maher 41-yard field goal, 0:00. Panthers 10–9. **Drive: 10 plays, 73 yards, 1:53.**

**Third quarter**

- NO – Brett Maher 33-yard field goal, 2:07. Saints 12–10. **Drive: 6 plays, 23 yards, 2:10.**

**Fourth quarter**

- NO – Alvin Kamara 12-yard pass from Taysom Hill (kick failed, hit right upright), 7:49. Saints 18–10. **Drive: 7 plays, 63 yards, 4:15.**

**Top passers**

- CAR – Sam Darnold – 17/26, 132 yards, INT
- NO – Taysom Hill – 17/28, 222 yards, TD

**Top rushers**

- CAR – Chuba Hubbard – 17 rushes, 55 yards, TD
- NO – Taysom Hill – 12 rushes, 45 yards

**Top receivers**

- CAR – Ian Thomas – 3 receptions, 33 yards
- NO – Marquez Callaway – 6 receptions, 97 yards

After both teams scored field goals on their respective opening drives, the Panthers scored a touchdown on a 21-yard run from Chuba Hubbard. In the second quarter, Sam Darnold was strip-sacked by P. J. Williams and the fumble was recovered by Marcus Davenport. From the turnover, Brett Maher kicked a 27-yard field goal before adding a 41-yard field goal at the end of the first half to reduce the Panthers' lead to 10–9 at halftime. Maher added a fourth field goal in the third quarter to give the Saints the lead. Then, after Lirim Hajrullahu missed a 47-yard attempt early in the fourth quarter, Taysom Hill completed a 12-yard pass to Alvin Kamara for the Saints' first touchdown since Week 14. Although Maher missed the extra point conversion, C. J. Gardner-Johnson intercepted Darnold on a pass intended for D. J. Moore in the final minute to seal the Saints' 18–10 win.

==== Week 18: at Tampa Bay Buccaneers ====
Week 18: Carolina Panthers at Tampa Bay Buccaneers – Game summary

Quarter	1	2	3	4	Total
Panthers	7	0	3	7	**17**
**Buccaneers**	0	10	7	24	**41**

at Raymond James Stadium, Tampa, Florida

- Date: January 9
- Game time: 4:25 p.m. EST
- Game weather: Cloudy, 82 °F (28 °C)
- Game attendance: 65,473
- Referee: Tony Corrente
- TV announcers (CBS): Tom McCarthy, Tony Romo, Tracy Wolfson, and Gene Steratore
- Recap, Game Book

Game information

**First quarter**

- CAR – Chuba Hubbard 2-yard pass from Sam Darnold (Lirim Hajrullahu kick), 7:22. Panthers 7–0. **Drive: 14 plays, 75 yards, 7:38.**

**Second quarter**

- TB – Ryan Succop 39-yard field goal, 11:09. Panthers 7–3. **Drive: 10 plays, 40 yards, 3:51.**
- TB – Le'Veon Bell 1-yard pass from Tom Brady (Ryan Succop kick), 0:15. Buccaneers 10–7. **Drive: 8 plays, 92 yards, 1:33.**

**Third quarter**

- TB – Ke'Shawn Vaughn 2-yard run (Ryan Succop kick), 11:57. Buccaneers 17–7. **Drive: 7 plays, 77 yards, 3:03.**
- CAR – Lirim Hajrullahu 35-yard field goal, 4:44. Buccaneers 17–10. **Drive: 9 plays, 52 yards, 4:42.**

**Fourth quarter**

- TB – Mike Evans 3-yard pass from Tom Brady (Ryan Succop kick), 14:56. Buccaneers 24–10. **Drive: 11 plays, 62 yards, 4:48.**
- CAR – Robby Anderson 19-yard pass from Sam Darnold (Lirim Hajrullahu kick), 10:34. Buccaneers 24–17. **Drive: 8 plays, 56 yards, 4:22.**
- TB – Mike Evans 20-yard pass from Tom Brady (Ryan Succop kick), 7:34. Buccaneers 31–17. **Drive: 6 plays, 75 yards, 3:00.**
- TB – Ryan Succop 40-yard field goal, 5:04. Buccaneers 34–17. **Drive: 4 plays, 5 yards, 1:25.**
- TB – Scotty Miller 33-yard run (Ryan Succop kick), 4:07. Buccaneers 41–17. **Drive: 1 play, 33 yards, 0:10.**

**Top passers**

- CAR – Sam Darnold – 29/42, 219 yards, 2 TD, INT
- TB – Tom Brady – 29/37, 326 yards, 3 TD

**Top rushers**

- CAR – Chuba Hubbard – 9 rushes, 48 yards
- TB – Scotty Miller – 2 rushes, 43 yards, TD

**Top receivers**

- CAR – D. J. Moore – 7 receptions, 87 yards
- TB – Rob Gronkowski – 7 receptions, 137 yards

The Panthers began the game with a long opening drive, which ended with Sam Darnold's touchdown pass to Chuba Hubbard. A Panthers turnover on downs led to a 39-yard field goal from Ryan Succop. On fourth-and-one from the two-yard line, Darnold was stopped short on a quarterback sneak by Steve McLendon. The Buccaneers then took the lead after driving almost the entire length of the field in under two minutes, as Tom Brady completed a touchdown pass to Le'Veon Bell with 15 seconds left before halftime. A touchdown run from Ke'Shawn Vaughn and a field goal from Lirim Hajrullahu were the only scoring plays of the third quarter. Though the game had remained close thus far, the Buccaneers pulled away in the fourth quarter. First, a pair of touchdown passes from Brady to Mike Evans sandwiched a touchdown pass from Darnold to Robby Anderson. After Rakeem Nuñez-Roches forced a Darnold fumble that was recovered by Antoine Winfield Jr., Succop added another field goal. Then, immediately after another Panthers turnover on downs, Scotty Miller scored on a 33-yard end-around run. Following the ensuing kickoff return, Darnold threw an interception to Andrew Adams on a pass intended for Anderson. Although the Buccaneers were unable to capitalize on the turnover, as Succop missed a 46-yard field goal attempt, they secured a 41–17 win. For the Panthers, the loss meant that they would end the season on a seven-game losing streak, which also prevented them from improving on their 5–11 record from the previous two seasons.

=== Standings ===
==== Division ====
NFC South
	W	L	T	PCT	DIV	CONF	PF	PA	STK
^{(2)} Tampa Bay Buccaneers	13	4	0	.765	4–2	8–4	511	353	W3
New Orleans Saints	9	8	0	.529	4–2	7–5	364	335	W2
Atlanta Falcons	7	10	0	.412	2–4	4–8	313	459	L2
Carolina Panthers	5	12	0	.294	2–4	3–9	304	404	L7

==== Conference ====
NFC
#	Team	Division	W	L	T	PCT	DIV	CONF	SOS	SOV	STK
**Division winners**
1 (Note: Green Bay finished ahead of Tampa Bay based on conference record (9–3 vs. 8–4), claiming the No. 1 seed.)	Green Bay Packers	North	13	4	0	.765	4–2	9–3	.479	.480	L1
2	Tampa Bay Buccaneers	South	13	4	0	.765	4–2	8–4	.467	.443	W3
3 (Note: Dallas claimed the No. 3 seed over LA Rams based on conference record (10–2 vs. 8–4).)	Dallas Cowboys	East	12	5	0	.706	6–0	10–2	.488	.431	W1
4	Los Angeles Rams	West	12	5	0	.706	3–3	8–4	.483	.409	L1
**Wild cards**
5	Arizona Cardinals	West	11	6	0	.647	4–2	7–5	.490	.492	L1
6	San Francisco 49ers	West	10	7	0	.588	2–4	7–5	.500	.438	W2
7 (Note: Philadelphia finished ahead of New Orleans based on head-to-head victory, claiming the 7th and final playoff spot.)	Philadelphia Eagles	East	9	8	0	.529	3–3	7–5	.469	.350	L1
**Did not qualify for the postseason**
8	New Orleans Saints	South	9	8	0	.529	4–2	7–5	.512	.516	W2
9	Minnesota Vikings	North	8	9	0	.471	4–2	6–6	.507	.434	W1
10 (Note: Washington finished ahead of Atlanta and Seattle based on head-to-head victories.)	Washington Football Team	East	7	10	0	.412	2–4	6–6	.529	.420	W1
11 (Note: Seattle finished ahead of Atlanta based on win percentage in common games (4–2 vs. 3–3 against: San Francisco, New Orleans, Jacksonville, Washington, and Detroit).)	Seattle Seahawks	West	7	10	0	.412	3–3	4–8	.519	.424	W2
12	Atlanta Falcons	South	7	10	0	.412	2–4	4–8	.472	.315	L2
13	Chicago Bears	North	6	11	0	.353	2–4	4–8	.524	.373	L1
14	Carolina Panthers	South	5	12	0	.294	2–4	3–9	.509	.412	L7
15	New York Giants	East	4	13	0	.235	1–5	3–9	.536	.485	L6
16	Detroit Lions	North	3	13	1	.206	2–4	3–9	.528	.627	W1
**Tiebreakers** (Note: When breaking ties for three or more teams under the NFL's rules, they are first broken within divisions, then comparing only the highest-ranked remaining team from each division.)

== Statistics ==
As of the end of the 2021 NFL season

=== Team ===
Category	Total yards	Yards per game	NFL rank (out of 32)
Passing offense	3,239	190.5	29th
Rushing offense	1,842	108.4	20th
Total offense	5,081	298.9	30th
Passing defense	3,266	192.1	4th
Rushing defense	1,935	113.8	18th
Total defense	5,201	305.9	2nd

=== Individual ===
Category	Player	Total yards
Offense
Passing	Sam Darnold	2,527
Rushing	Chuba Hubbard	612
Receiving	D. J. Moore	1,157
Defense
Tackles (Solo)	Jeremy Chinn	75
Sacks	Haason Reddick	11
Interceptions	Stephon Gilmore; Donte Jackson; Shaq Thompson	2
