= Ian Thomas (American football) =

American football player (born 1996)

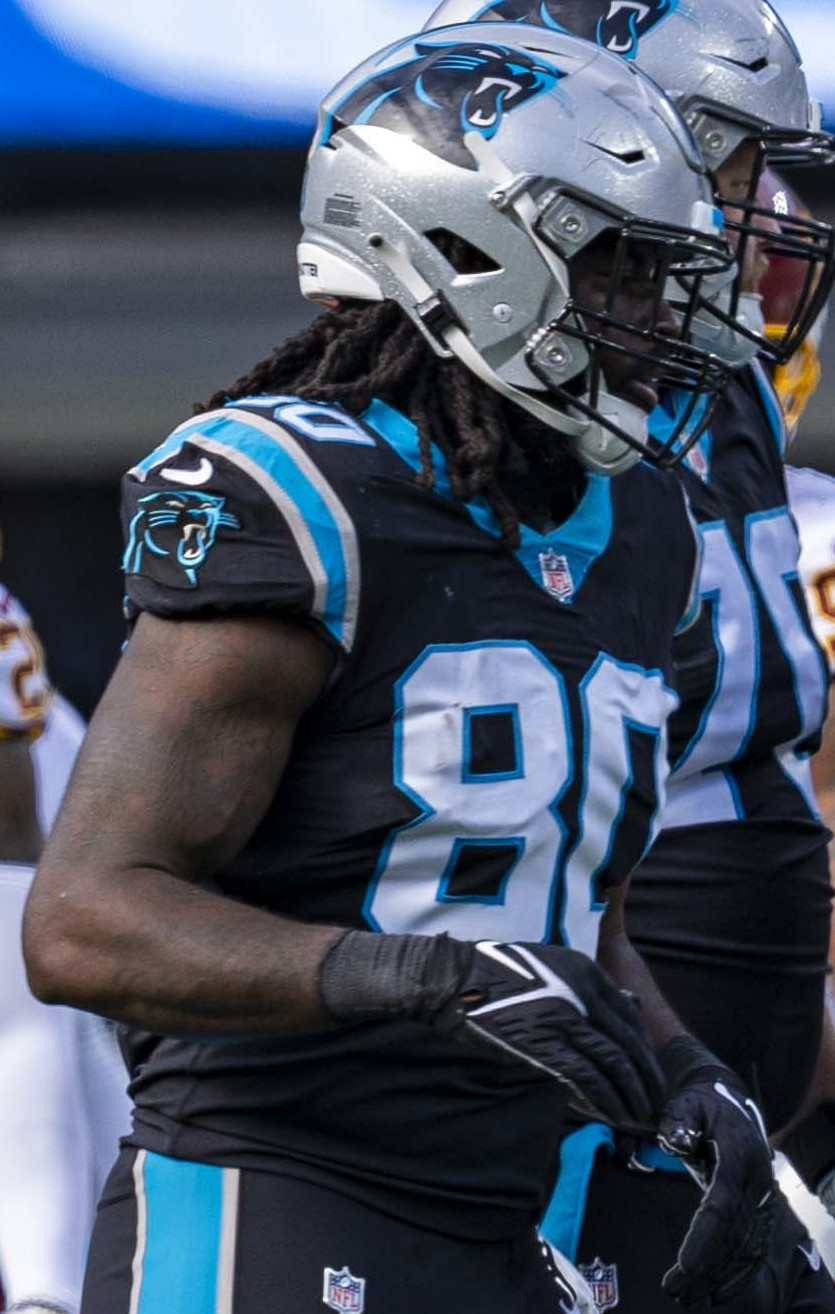
- Thomas with the Carolina Panthers in 2021

No. 80 – Las Vegas Raiders
- Position: Tight end
- Roster status: Active

Personal information
- Born: June 6, 1996 (age 30); Baltimore, Maryland, U.S.
- Listed height: 6 ft 3 in (1.91 m)
- Listed weight: 253 lb (115 kg)

Career information
- High school: Digital Harbor (Baltimore)
- College: Nassau CC (2014–2015); Indiana (2016–2017)
- NFL draft: 2018: 4th round, 101st overall pick

Career history
- Carolina Panthers (2018–2024); Las Vegas Raiders (2025–present)

Career NFL statistics as of 2025
- Receptions: 132
- Receiving yards: 1,176
- Receiving touchdowns: 4
- Stats at Pro Football Reference

Ian Thomas (born June 6, 1996) is an American professional football tight end for the Las Vegas Raiders of the National Football League (NFL). He played college football for the Indiana Hoosiers, and was selected by the Carolina Panthers in the fourth round of the 2018 NFL draft.

== Early life ==
Thomas's mother Martha died due to liver and kidney failure before Thomas was nine. His father died a year later due to a heart attack.

== College career ==
Thomas graduated from Nassau Community College in 2016, and joined Indiana for his junior year. Thomas played all 13 games during his first year at Indiana, acting as a blocking tight end and recording only three catches. During his senior year, after a game against Georgia Southern, in which he had a 71-yard touchdown, Thomas was named the Mackey Award Tight End of the Week. As a senior, Thomas had 25 receptions for 376 yards and five touchdowns.

Following his senior season at Indiana, Thomas was invited to the 2018 Senior Bowl.

== Professional career ==
On November 21, 2017, it was reported that Thomas has accepted his invitation to play in the 2018 Senior Bowl. Thomas helped his draft stock by impressing scouts during Senior Bowl practices. On January 27, 2018, Thomas played in the Reese's Senior Bowl and was part of Houston Texans' head coach Bill O'Brien's South team that defeated the North 45–16. He participated at the NFL Scouting Combine in Indianapolis and performed the majority of combine drills, but opted to skip the bench press due to a pre-existing shoulder injury.

External videos
- Ian Thomas' NFL Combine Workout
- ESPN Prospect Profile: Ian Thomas

On April 3, 2018, Thomas attended Indiana's pro day, but chose to stand on his combine numbers and only ran positional drills. He also attended private meetings and workouts with the Atlanta Falcons and Jacksonville Jaguars. At the conclusion of the pre-draft process, his draft projections by NFL draft experts and scouts varied from as early as the second round to as late as the seventh round. The majority of experts projected him to be drafted in the second or third round. Thomas was also ranked as the fifth best tight end prospect in the draft by DraftScout.com and CBS Sports and was ranked the sixth best tight end by Scouts Inc.

Pre-draft measurables
Height	Weight	Arm length	Hand span	Wingspan	40-yard dash	10-yard split	20-yard split	20-yard shuttle	Three-cone drill	Vertical jump	Broad jump
6 ft 3 5/8 in (1.92 m)	259 lb (117 kg)	32 1/2 in (0.83 m)	10 in (0.25 m)	6 ft 8 1/8 in (2.04 m)	4.74 s	1.69 s	2.70 s	4.20 s	7.15 s	36 in (0.91 m)	10 ft 3 in (3.12 m)
All values from NFL Combine

=== Carolina Panthers ===
The Carolina Panthers selected Thomas in the fourth round with the 101st overall pick in the 2018 NFL draft. He was the sixth tight end drafted in 2018.

External videos
- Panthers draft Ian Thomas 101st overall

On May 10, 2018, the Panthers signed Thomas to a four-year, $3.20 million contract that includes a signing bonus of $747,994. He made his NFL debut in the season opener against the Dallas Cowboys. In the 16–8 victory, he had four receiving yards on his first two career receptions. In Week 16 against the Atlanta Falcons, he scored his first professional touchdown on a one-yard reception from quarterback Taylor Heinicke. In his rookie season, he appeared in all 16 games and started six of them. He totaled 36 receptions for 333 receiving yards and two receiving touchdowns.

In the 2019 season, Thomas appeared in all 16 games, of which he started three. He totaled 16 receptions for 136 receiving yards and one receiving touchdown.

On February 25, 2022, Thomas signed a three-year, $16.5 million contract extension with the Panthers.

On October 14, 2023, Thomas was placed on injured reserve with a calf injury. He was activated on November 18.

On September 7, 2024, Thomas was placed on injured reserve with a calf injury. He was activated on October 12, but placed back on injured reserve on November 18.

=== Las Vegas Raiders ===
On March 25, 2025, Thomas signed with the Las Vegas Raiders.

On April 8, 2026, Thomas re-signed with the Raiders on a one-year contract.

== NFL career statistics ==
Legend
**Bold**	Career high

=== Regular season ===
Year	Team	Games		Receiving					Tackles			Fumbles				
Year	Team	GP	GS	Rec	Yds	Avg	Lng	TD	Cmb	Solo	Ast	FF	Fum	FR	Yds	TD
2018	CAR	16	6	**36**	**333**	9.3	31	**2**	**1**	**1**	0	0	0	0	0	0
2019	CAR	16	3	16	136	8.5	19	1	0	0	0	0	0	0	0	0
2020	CAR	16	8	20	145	7.3	21	1	0	0	0	0	**1**	0	0	0
2021	CAR	**17**	13	18	188	10.4	41	0	**1**	**1**	0	0	0	**1**	**9**	0
2022	CAR	**17**	**17**	21	197	9.4	**50**	0	**1**	0	**1**	0	0	0	0	0
2023	CAR	12	5	5	56	**11.2**	28	0	**1**	**1**	0	0	0	0	0	0
2024	CAR	5	2	3	7	2.3	3	0	0	0	0	0	0	0	0	0
2025	LV	15	10	13	114	8.8	20	0	0	0	0	0	0	0	0	0
Career		114	64	132	1176	8.9	50	4	4	3	1	0	1	1	9	0

== Personal life ==
On February 28, 2022, it was announced that Thomas would be facing five misdemeanor charges: reckless driving, operation of a vehicle that is not insured, attempt to flee/elude arrest, failure to heed light or siren, and driving with a revoked license. The charges stemmed from an incident in which Thomas and an unidentified driver of a red ATV were pulled over for not having license plates after which Thomas left the scene before being stopped and arrested.
