= Tommy Tremble =

American football Player (born 2000)

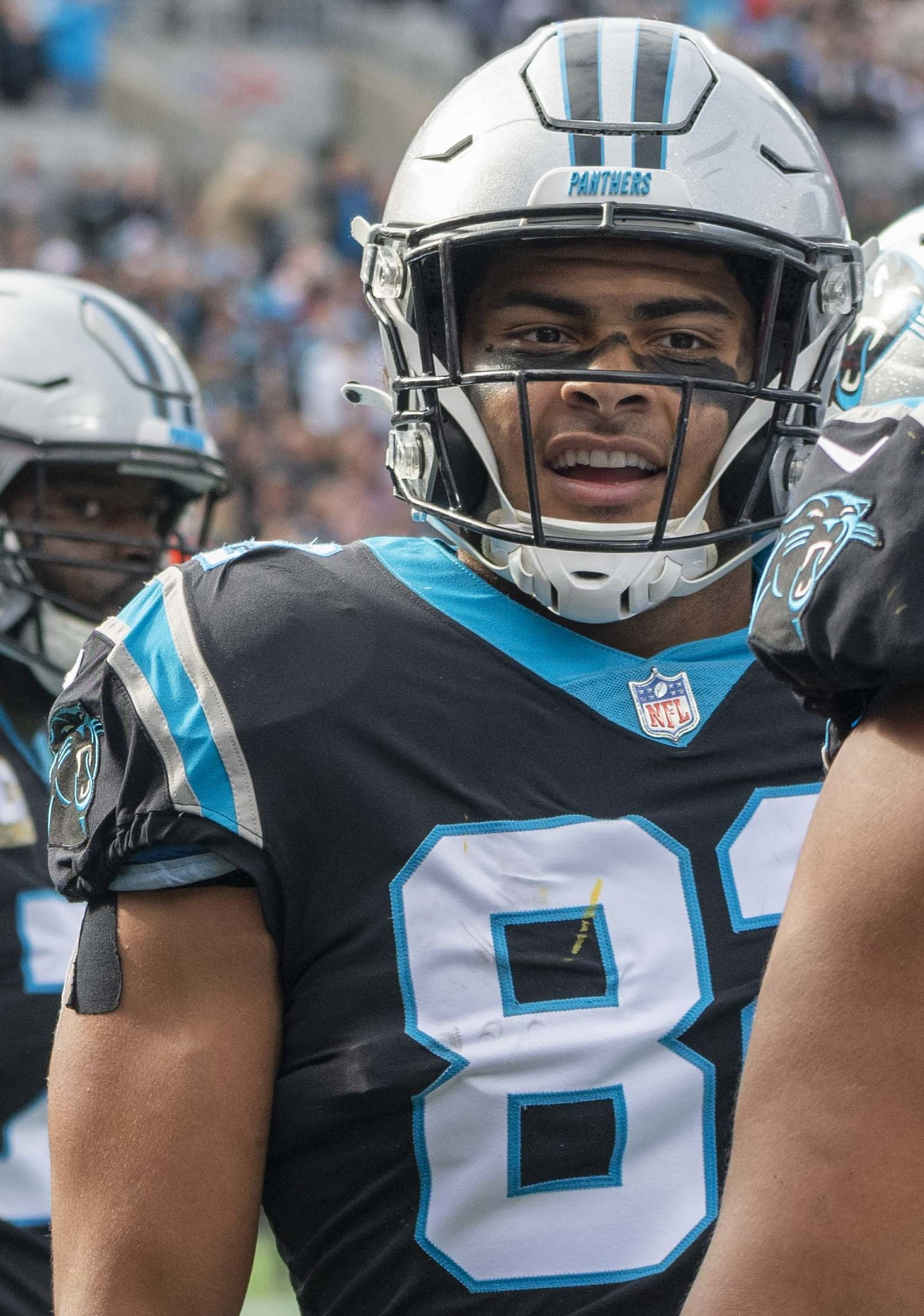
- Tremble with the Carolina Panthers in 2021

No. 82 – Carolina Panthers
- Position: Tight end
- Roster status: Active

Personal information
- Born: June 2, 2000 (age 26); Johns Creek, Georgia, U.S.
- Listed height: 6 ft 4 in (1.93 m)
- Listed weight: 247 lb (112 kg)

Career information
- High school: Wesleyan (Peachtree Corners, Georgia)
- College: Notre Dame (2018–2020)
- NFL draft: 2021: 3rd round, 83rd overall pick

Career history
- Carolina Panthers (2021–present)

Career NFL statistics as of 2025
- Receptions: 112
- Receiving yards: 1,031
- Receiving touchdowns: 11
- Rushing yards: 11
- Rushing touchdowns: 1
- Stats at Pro Football Reference

Thomas Steven Tremble (born June 2, 2000) is an American professional football tight end for the Carolina Panthers of the National Football League (NFL). He played college football for the Notre Dame Fighting Irish and was selected by the Panthers in the third round of the 2021 NFL draft.

== Early life and college ==
Tremble attended Wesleyan School in Peachtree Corners, Georgia. He committed to the University of Notre Dame to play college football in 2018. After not playing in any games his true freshman year, Tremble played in all 13 in 2019, recording 16 receptions for 183 yards and four touchdowns. In 2020, he had 19 receptions for 218 yards. After the season he declared for the 2021 NFL draft.

== Professional career ==
Pre-draft measurables
Height	Weight	Arm length	Hand span	Wingspan	40-yard dash	10-yard split	20-yard split	Vertical jump	Broad jump	Bench press
6 ft 3 3/8 in (1.91 m)	241 lb (109 kg)	31 7/8 in (0.81 m)	9 1/4 in (0.23 m)	6 ft 6 1/2 in (1.99 m)	4.65 s	1.56 s	2.60 s	36.5 in (0.93 m)	10 ft 2 in (3.10 m)	20 reps
All values from Pro Day

Tremble was selected by the Carolina Panthers in the third round with the 83rd overall pick in the 2021 NFL draft. Tremble signed his four-year rookie contract with Carolina on July 22, 2021. In Week 5, against the Philadelphia Eagles, he recorded his first NFL touchdown on a five-yard reception. As a rookie, he appeared in 16 games and started 11. He finished with 20 receptions for 180 receiving yards and a touchdown.

On October 22, 2022, during Week 7 against the Tampa Bay Buccaneers, Tremble scored his first touchdown of the season on his only catch of the game on a 29–yard pass from P. J. Walker. In the 2022 season, he appeared in 17 games and started four. He finished with 19 receptions for 174 receiving yards and three receiving touchdowns. In the 2023 season, he appeared in 16 games and started eight. He finished with 23 receptions for 194 yards and three touchdowns. In the 2024 season, he recorded 23 receptions for 234 yards and two touchdowns.

On March 8, 2025, Tremble re-signed with the Panthers on a two-year contract worth $16 million, with $8 million guaranteed. On May 27, Tremble underwent successful surgery on his back.

== Career statistics ==
=== NFL ===
Legend
**Bold**	Career high

==== Regular season ====
Year	Team	Games		Receiving					Rushing					Fumbles	
Year	Team	GP	GS	Rec	Yds	Avg	Lng	TD	Att	Yds	Avg	Lng	TD	Fum	Lost
2021	CAR	16	11	20	180	9.0	30	1	**3**	**11**	**3.7**	**7**	**1**	0	0
2022	CAR	17	4	19	174	9.2	29	**3**	0	0	0.0	0	0	**1**	**1**
2023	CAR	16	8	23	194	8.4	30	**3**	0	0	0.0	0	0	0	0
2024	CAR	12	11	23	234	**10.2**	38	2	0	0	0.0	0	0	**1**	**1**
2025	CAR	17	16	**27**	**249**	9.2	**54**	2	0	0	0.0	0	0	0	0
Career		78	50	112	1,031	9.2	54	11	3	11	3.7	7	1	2	2

==== Postseason ====
Year	Team	Games		Receiving					Rushing					Fumbles	
Year	Team	GP	GS	Rec	Yds	Avg	Lng	TD	Att	Yds	Avg	Lng	TD	Fum	Lost
2025	CAR	1	1	3	22	7.3	11	0	0	0	0.0	0	0	0	0
Career		1	1	3	22	7.3	11	0	0	0	0.0	0	0	0	0

=== College ===
Year	Team	Games		Receiving				
Year	Team	GP	GS	Rec	Yds	Avg	Lng	TD
2018	Notre Dame	0	0	DNP				
2019	Notre Dame	13	7	16	183	11.4	29	4
2020	Notre Dame	12	9	19	218	11.5	30	0
Career		25	16	35	401	11.5	30	4

== Personal life ==
His father, Greg Tremble, played in the NFL and was a member of the Dallas Cowboys team who won Super Bowl XXX.
