= Shaq Thompson =

American football player (born 1994)

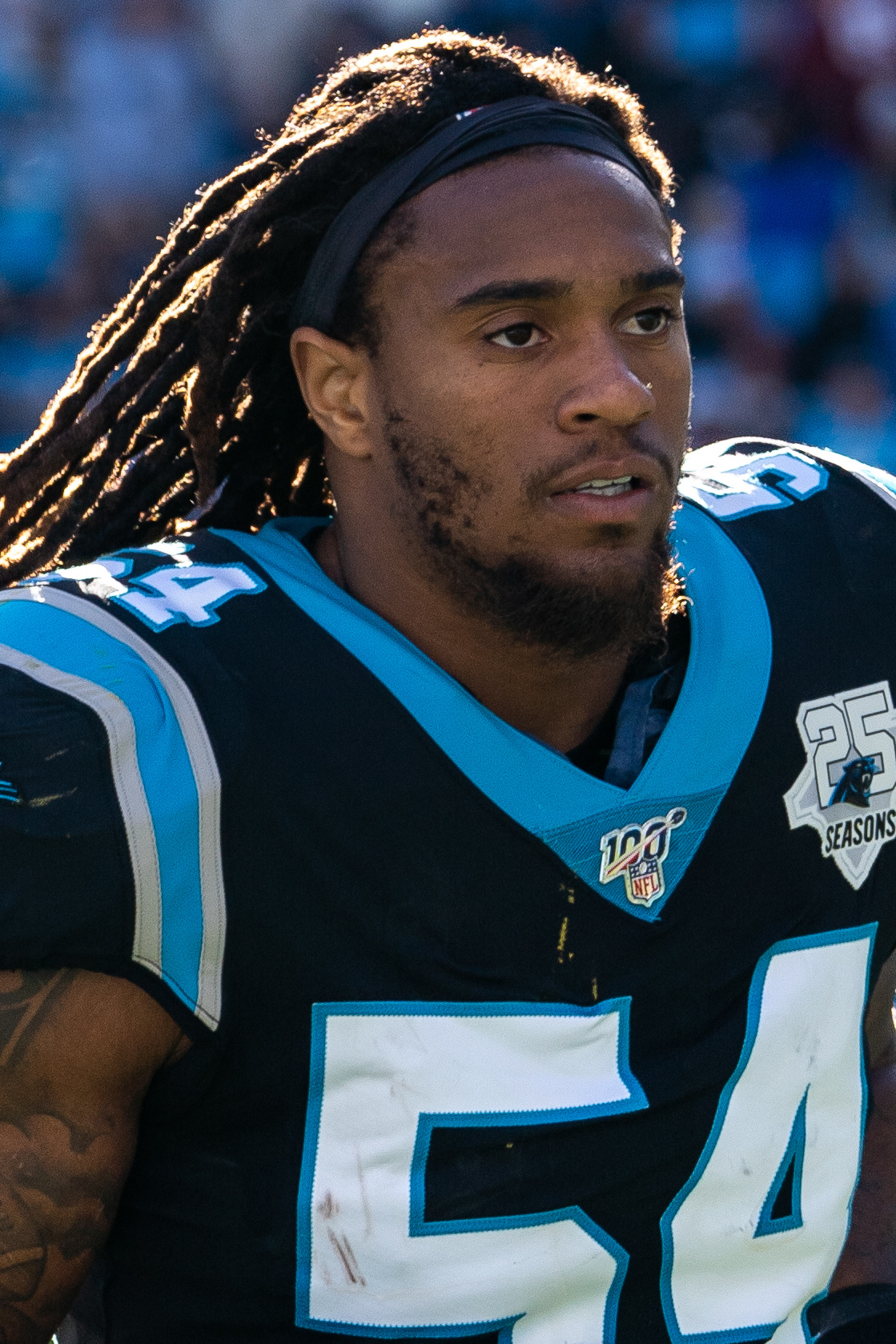
- Thompson with the Carolina Panthers in 2019

No. 54 – Buffalo Bills
- Position: Linebacker
- Roster status: Practice squad

Personal information
- Born: April 21, 1994 (age 32); Sacramento, California, U.S.
- Listed height: 6 ft 0 in (1.83 m)
- Listed weight: 230 lb (104 kg)

Career information
- High school: Grant Union (Sacramento)
- College: Washington (2012–2014)
- NFL draft: 2015: 1st round, 25th overall pick

Career history
- Carolina Panthers (2015–2024); Buffalo Bills (2025–present)

Awards and highlights
- Paul Hornung Award (2014); First-team All-American (2014); First-team All-Pac-12 (2014)

Career NFL statistics as of Week 11, 2026
- Total tackles: 810
- Sacks: 13.0
- Forced fumbles: 5
- Fumble recoveries: 4
- Pass deflections: 29
- Interceptions: 3
- Defensive touchdowns: 1
- Stats at Pro Football Reference

Shaquille Green Thompson (born April 21, 1994) is an American professional football linebacker for the Buffalo Bills of the National Football League (NFL). He played college football for the Washington Huskies, earning first-team All-American honors in 2014. He also had a short stint playing baseball with the Boston Red Sox organization as part of their rookie team in the Gulf Coast League. He was drafted by the Carolina Panthers in the first round of the 2015 NFL draft, and played nine years in Carolina.

== Early life ==
A native of Sacramento, California, Thompson attended Grant Union High School, where he was a three-sport star in football, track and baseball. He was named first-team All-America by Rivals.com, Parade and USA Today, and second-team All-America from MaxPreps.com and Sports Illustrated. He was one of six finalists for the U.S. Army Player of the Year Award. He was named the area's player of the year by The Sacramento Bee, and also the Player of the Year in the Delta Valley League. As a sophomore, he helped Pacers to a 12–1 overall record. As a junior, he rushed for 1,882 yards and 25 touchdowns on 164 carries, helping lead Grant to an 8–4 record and the quarterfinals of the CIF Sac-Joaquin Section Division I playoffs. He was named the Delta Valley League MVP in 2011. He totaled 57 tackles as a senior while also rushing for 1,134 yards and 15 touchdowns on 120 carries and passing for 893 yards and eight more scores. He also played in the 2012 U.S. Army All-American Bowl after his senior year.

In addition to football, Thompson was a standout baseball player. Thompson was drafted by the Boston Red Sox in the 18th round of the 2012 MLB draft, and played for the Sox' rookie-level team in the Gulf Coast League in the summer of 2012. He decided to end his baseball career and focus on football full-time after he batted 0-for-39 with 37 strikeouts over 13 games.

Also a talented sprinter, Thompson lettered all four years in track & field. He posted a personal-best time of 10.96 seconds in the 100-meter dash at the 2010 CIF San Joaquin Master Finals, where he took seventh. He finished fifth in the 200-meter dash (21.69 s) at the 2010 CIF State Track and Field Championships. At the 2011 CIF State Track and Field Championships, he placed seventh (21.77 s) in the 200 meters in a race dominated by defending state champion Remontay McClain.

Thompson was regarded as a five star-recruit. He was ranked the No. 1 safety and the No. 3 overall prospect in the country by Scout.com. He was listed as the No. 1 safety in the nation, No. 4 overall recruit in the country and the No. 1 prospect in the state of California by Rivals.com. He was also rated the No. 4 recruit in the country by SuperPrep, which also named him the Far West Defensive Player of the Year. He first committed to the University of California, Berkeley before changing his commitment to the University of Washington on January 31, 2012.

College recruiting
Name	Hometown	School	Height	Weight	40^{‡}	Commit date
Shaq Thompson; S	Sacramento, California	Grant Union High School	6 ft 2 in (1.88 m)	210 lb (95 kg)	4.57	Jan 31, 2012
Shaq Thompson; S	Recruit ratings: Scout: Rivals: 247Sports: (84)					
Overall recruit ranking: Scout: 3 (overall), 1 (S) Rivals: 4 (overall), 1 (S), 1 (CA) ESPN: 16 (overall), 3 (S), 3 (CA)
‡ Refers to 40-yard dash; Note: In many cases, Scout, Rivals, 247Sports, On3, and ESPN may conflict in their listings of height, weight and 40 time.; In these cases, the average was taken. ESPN grades are on a 100-point scale.; Sources: "Washington Football Commitment List (25)". Rivals.; "2012 Washington College Football Recruiting Commits". Scout.; "ESPN". ESPN.; "Scout.com Team Recruiting Rankings". Scout.; "2012 Team Ranking". Rivals.com.

== College career ==
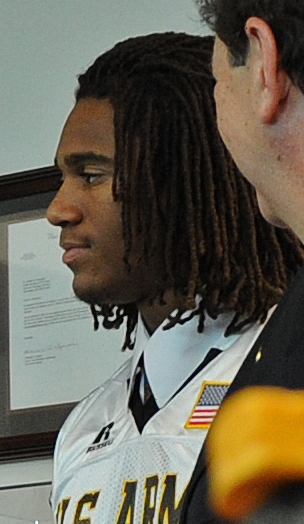
Thompson in 2011.

Thompson played at the University of Washington from 2012 to 2014, where he played safety, slot corner, linebacker, and running back. As a junior, he won the Paul Hornung Award and was named an All-American.

As a freshman in 2012, Thompson earned an honorable mention All-Pac-12 Conference, was named second-team Freshman All-American by FoxSportsNext.com and was picked for the Travis Spring Most Outstanding Freshman award at the team banquet. He started at nickel back in his first college game in a season-opener vs. San Diego State. He made seven tackles, two for loss, and had a crucial, late interception that he returned 33 yards in a win at Cal. He also had a strong performance at Washington State, collecting eight tackles, including a sack, and also recovering a fumble and returning it 21 yards.

As a sophomore in 2013, Thompson played in every game and started all but the Apple Cup at linebacker. He was an honorable mention All-Pac-12. He picked up the team's Chuck Niemi Big Hit Award. He scored on an 80-yard interception return in the win at Oregon State, where he also had four tackles. He notched six tackles in the Apple Cup win over Washington State. He recorded eight tackles in the Huskies' win over BYU in the Fight Hunger Bowl.

In his final year at Washington in 2014, Thompson was awarded the fifth annual Paul Hornung Award, given to the nation's most versatile player. He was named first-team All-America by ESPN, CBS Sports, Scout.com and SB Nation. He announced on January 5, 2015, that he would forgo his senior season and enter the 2015 NFL draft. He was named a Midseason All-American by ESPN, NFL.com, CBS Sports and Phil Steele. He was listed as the national defensive player of the year by three of six writers on the CBS Sports panel. He scored six touchdowns in 2014, two as a running back and four on defense (one interception return and three fumble returns). He was named a first-team preseason All-America by Athlon. He made SI.com's preseason All-America second team. He was also named to the preseason watch list for both the Bednarik (top defensive player) and Paul Hornung (most versatile player) Awards. He started each of the Huskies' games for the season. In a victory over Eastern Washington, he notched 15 tackles, including a sack, forced a fumble and also had three carries for 66 yards, including a 57-yard touchdown run. He was named the national defensive player of the week by the Walter Camp Foundation and Athlon's following a two-touchdown performance vs. Illinois, where he scored on a 36-yard interception return and on a 52-yard fumble return, becoming the first Husky on record to have scored two defensive touchdowns in the same game. He scored his third defensive touchdown (and fourth overall) vs. Stanford, returning a fumble (that he forced) 32 yards for a score. He also had seven tackles, including one for a loss, and forced another fumble vs. the Cardinal. He scored on a 100-yard fumble return in the win at Cal, where he was a game captain. He has one of just four 100-yard plays in University of Washington history (the others were a punt return by Hugh McElhenny, and kickoff returns by Paul Arnold and John Ross). He also had a game-high 11 tackles against the Bears, and was named the National Defensive Player of the Week by Athlon, as well as Pac-12 Defensive Player of the Week, following the Cal game. He played mostly running back vs. Arizona State, gaining 98 yards on 21 carries, and also caught two passes for 15 yards. He started at tailback at Colorado, rushing for 174 yards and a touchdown on just 15 carries (11.6-yard average), leading this to be named the team's offensive player of the game after the win in Boulder. He made a second straight start at tailback, but also saw a good deal of action on the defense, vs. UCLA, when he was a game captain. He rushed for 100 yards on 16 carries vs. the Bruins, while also notching four tackles. He played only on defense and special teams at Arizona, finishing with three tackles. He made five tackles in the Apple Cup win at Washington State. He posted 10 tackles, including half of a tackle for loss, in the Cactus Bowl. He was tied for second in the nation with four fumble recoveries. Following his junior season, Thompson announced on January 5, 2015, that he would forgo his senior season and declare the 2015 NFL Draft.

== Professional career ==
External videos
- Thompson's NFL Combine 40-yard dash

Pre-draft measurables
Height	Weight	Arm length	Hand span	Wingspan	40-yard dash	10-yard split	20-yard split	20-yard shuttle	Three-cone drill	Vertical jump	Broad jump
6 ft 0 1/8 in (1.83 m)	228 lb (103 kg)	33 in (0.84 m)	9 1/2 in (0.24 m)	6 ft 7 in (2.01 m)	4.64 s	1.69 s	2.75 s	4.08 s	6.99 s	33.5 in (0.85 m)	9 ft 9 in (2.97 m)
All values from NFL Combine

=== Carolina Panthers ===
==== 2015 ====
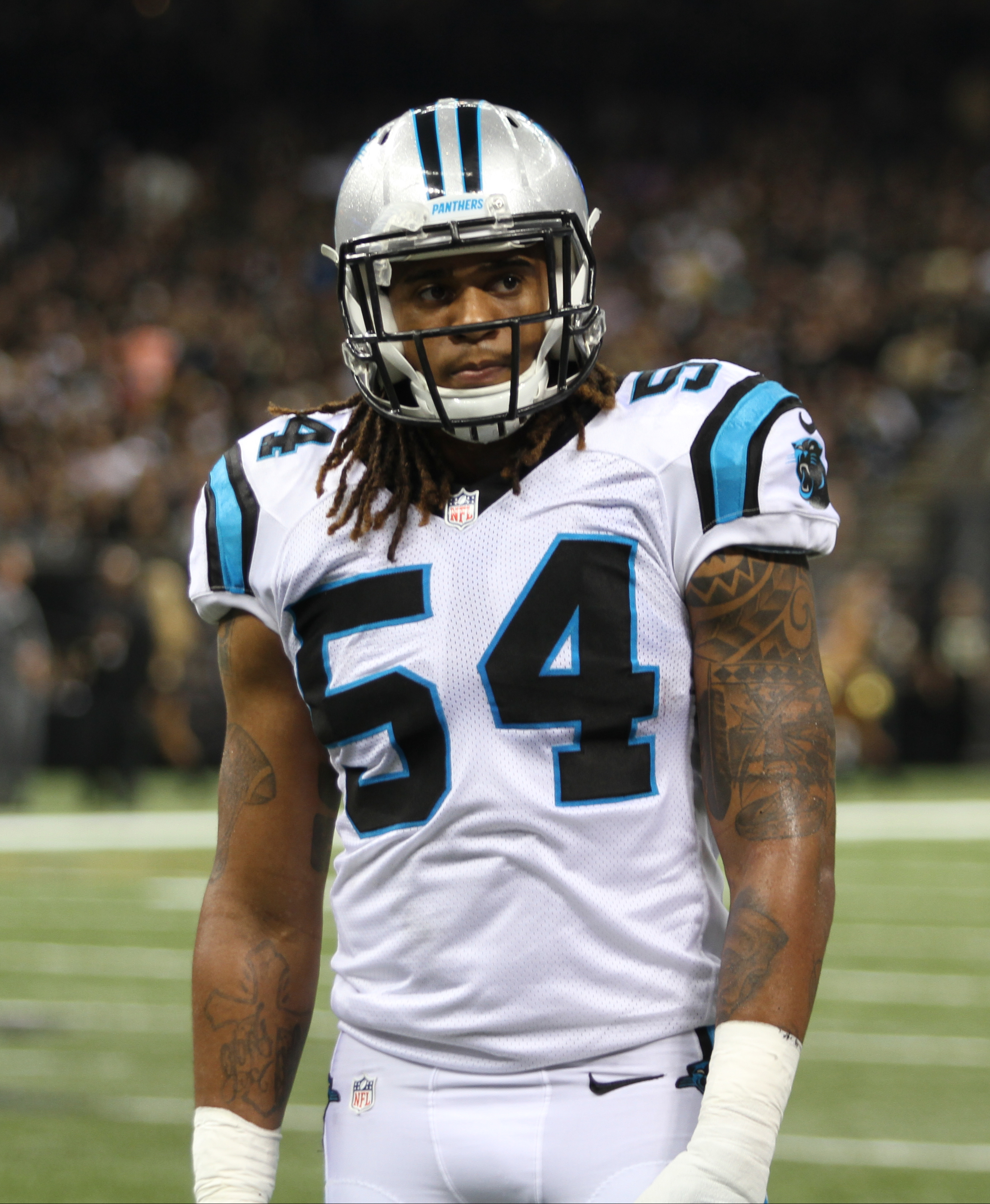
Thompson in his rookie season.

The Carolina Panthers selected Thompson in the first round (25th overall) of the 2015 NFL Draft. He was the third outside linebacker, behind Bud Dupree and Shane Ray, and seventh edge rusher drafted in 2015. On May 7, 2015, the Panthers signed Thompson to a four-year, $8.80 million contract that includes $7.17 million guaranteed and a signing bonus of $4.66 million.

External videos
- Panthers draft Shaq Thompson

Thompson was not able to attend training camp until Washington's school year ended due to the NFL's policy on rookies being unable to join training camp until the conclusion of the school year. Throughout training camp, he competed for the job as the starting outside linebacker against A. J. Klein. Head coach Ron Rivera named Thompson the starting strongside linebacker, alongside Thomas Davis Sr. and middle linebacker Luke Kuechly.

He make his professional regular season debut and first career start in the Panthers' season-opening 20–9 victory at the Jacksonville Jaguars. On September 27, 2015, Thompson recorded a season-high seven combined tackles and made his first career sack on Drew Brees in a 27–22 victory against the New Orleans Saints. In Week 6, he collected four combined tackles before leaving the 27–23 victory at the Seattle Seahawks due to a knee sprain. The knee injury sidelined him for the next two games (Weeks 7–8). On January 3, 2016, Thompson tied his season-high with seven combined tackles during a 38–10 win against the Tampa Bay Buccaneers. He finished his rookie season in 2015 with a total of 50 combined tackles (32 solo), two pass deflections, and a sack in 14 games and ten starts.

The Panthers finished first in the NFC South with a 15–1 record and received a first round bye. On January 17, 2016, Thompson started his first career playoff game and assisted on one tackle during the Panthers' 31–24 victory against the Seattle Seahawks in the National Football Conference (NFC) Divisional Round. The Panthers defeated the Arizona Cardinals 49–15 in the NFC Championship the following week. On February 7, 2016, Thompson appeared in Super Bowl 50 and recorded five combined tackles as the Panthers were defeated 24–10 by the Denver Broncos.

==== 2016 ====
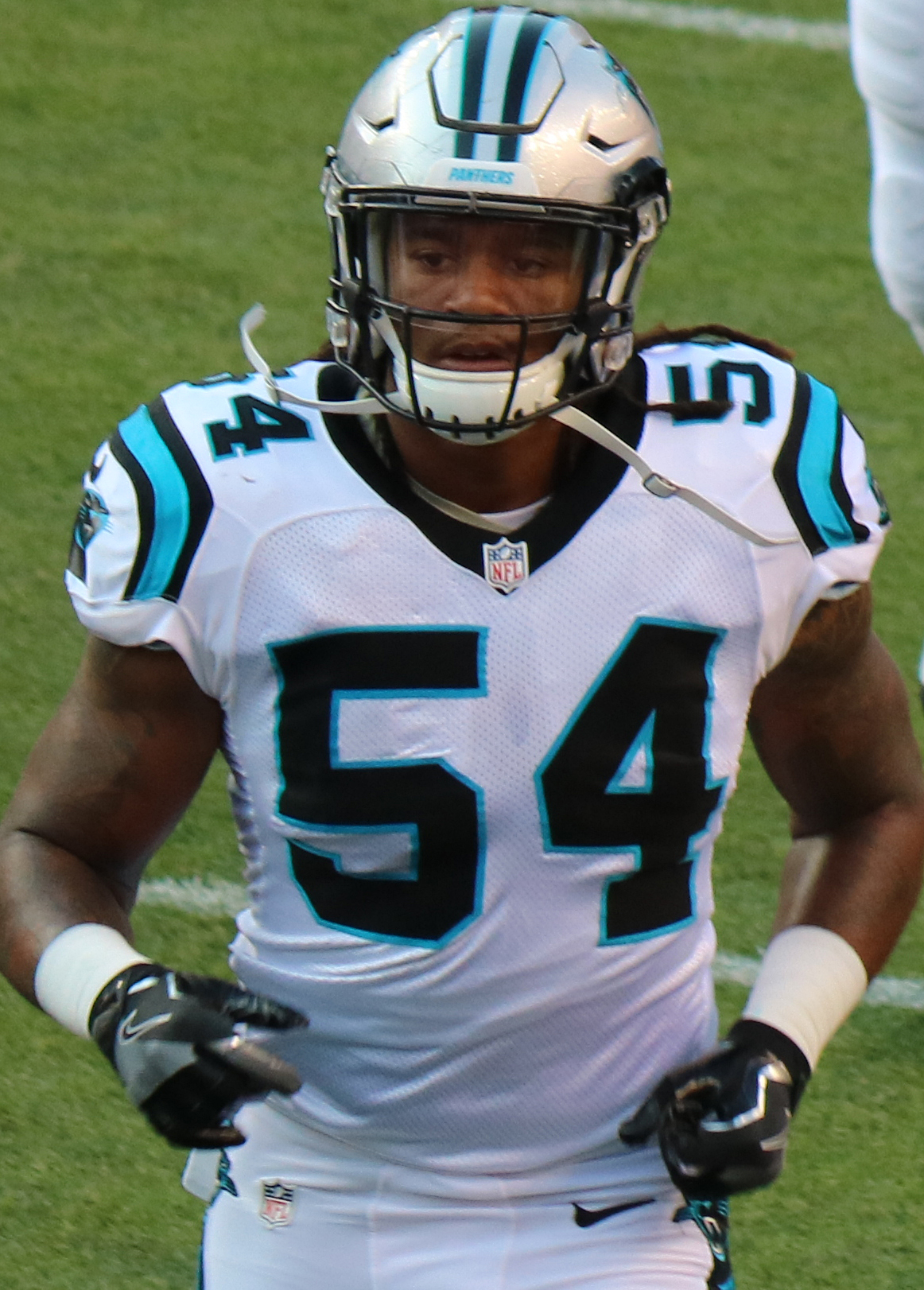
Thompson in 2016.

Thompson sustained a knee sprain and was forced to miss two games (Week 9–10). On December 11, 2016, he made seven combined tackles, broke up a pass, and made his first career interception off of a pass attempt by Philip Rivers in a 28–16 victory over the San Diego Chargers. In Week 16, Thompson recorded a season-high 11 combined tackles and deflected a pass during the Panthers' 33–16 loss to the Atlanta Falcons. Thompson finished the 2016 season with 56 combined tackles (39 solo), five pass deflections, and an interception in 14 games and 12 starts. Pro Football Focus gave Thompson an overall grade of 85.6 in 2016 and played 533 defensive snaps.

==== 2017 ====
Defensive coordinator Steve Wilks retained Thompson as the starting strongside linebacker after Sean McDermott departed to become the head coach of the Buffalo Bills. He started the Panthers' season-opener at the San Francisco 49ers, recording two solo tackles and a sack of Brian Hoyer during their 23–3 victory. On October 1, 2017, Thompson made a season-high ten combined tackles in their 33–30 win against the New England Patriots. He missed two games (Week 14–15) after suffering from plantar fasciitis. He finished his third season with a career-high 61 combined tackles (41 solo), two sacks, and one pass deflections in 14 games, all of them starts. Pro Football Focus gave Thompson an overall grade of 77.4, which ranked 31st among all qualifying linebackers in 2017.

==== 2018–2025 ====
On April 23, 2018, the Panthers picked up the fifth-year option on Thompson's contract. He played in 14 games with 11 starts, recording a career-high 79 tackles and 3.5 sacks. He suffered a shoulder injury in Week 15 and was placed on injured reserve on December 20, 2018.

In Week 4 of the 2019 season against the Houston Texans, Thompson recorded a team-high 12 tackles and sacked quarterback Deshaun Watson once in the 16–10 win. In Week 9 against the Tennessee Titans, Thompson recorded a team-high 11 tackles and sacked Ryan Tannehill once in the 30–20 win. On December 7, 2019, Thompson signed a four-year, $54.2 million contract extension with the Panthers.

In Week 3 of the 2020 season against the Los Angeles Chargers, Thompson led the team with 12 tackles, forced a fumble on running back Joshua Kelley, and recovered the football during the 21–16 win. He was placed on the reserve/COVID-19 list by the Panthers on December 7, 2020, and activated on December 11.

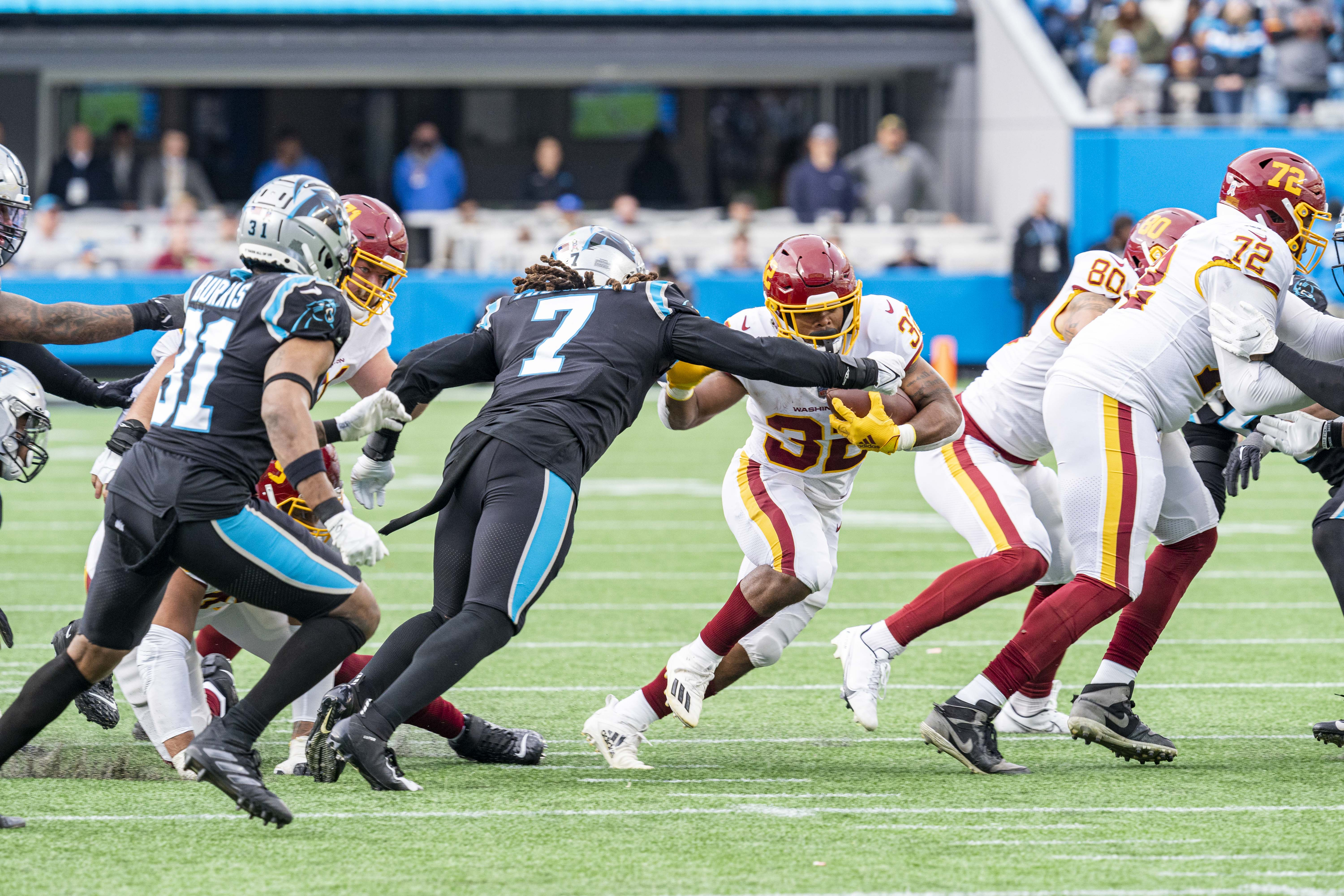
Thompson (#7) playing against the Washington Football Team in 2021.

With the NFL's new rules on jersey numbers, Thompson chose to switch his jersey number to #7 in 2021 - the number he wore in college.

In March 2022, Thompson agreed to a contract restructure in order free up cap space for the Panthers. He started all 17 games in 2022, recording a career-high and team-leading 135 tackles, four passes defensed, and 0.5 sacks.

In Week 2 of the 2023 season, Thompson suffered a broken fibula and was placed on injured reserve on September 19, 2023.

Thompson made 4 starts for Carolina in 2024, logging 35 combined tackles. On September 30, 2024, it was announced that Thompson suffered a torn Achilles, ruling him out for the remainder of the season.

On February 24, 2025, Thompson was released by the Panthers.

=== Buffalo Bills ===
On June 10, 2025, Thompson signed a one-year contract with the Buffalo Bills. The move reunited him with then-Bills head coach Sean McDermott, his former defensive coordinator in Carolina, and Bills general manager Brandon Beane, who was the Panthers' assistant general manager for Thompson's first two years there.

On August 31, 2026, Thompson was signed to the Bills' practice squad.

=== Statistics ===
Year	Team	Games		Tackles					Interceptions						Fumbles			
Year	Team	GP	GS	Comb	Solo	Ast	Sck	SFTY	PDef	Int	Yds	Avg	Lng	TD	FF	FR	Yds	TD
2015	CAR	14	10	50	32	18	1.0	--	2	0	0	0	0	--	0	0	0	0
2016	CAR	14	12	56	39	17	0.0	--	5	1	12	12.0	12	--	0	2	9	1
2017	CAR	14	14	61	41	20	2.0	--	1	0	0	0	0	--	1	0	0	0
2018	CAR	14	11	80	51	29	3.5	--	1	0	0	0	0	--	1	0	0	0
2019	CAR	14	14	109	75	34	3.0	--	3	0	0	0	0	--	0	0	0	0
2020	CAR	16	16	114	64	50	0.0	--	5	0	0	0	0	--	2	1	0	0
2021	CAR	14	13	104	65	39	2.0	--	5	2	39	19.5	29	--	0	0	0	0
2022	CAR	17	17	135	78	57	0.5	--	4	0	0	0	0	--	0	1	0	0
2023	CAR	2	2	8	6	2	0.0	--	0	0	0	0	0	--	0	0	0	0
2024	CAR	4	4	35	19	16	0.0	--	0	0	0	0	0	--	0	0	0	0
2025	BUF	12	6	56	33	23	1.0	--	2	0	0	0	0	--	1	0	0	0
2026	BUF	1	0	2	0	2	0.0	--	1	0	0	0	0	--	0	0	0	0
Total		136	118	810	503	307	13.0	0	29	3	51	17.0	29	0	5	4	9	1

== Personal life ==
Raised in Sacramento, California, Thompson is the son of Patty, a single mother, and the youngest of four brothers. His older brother Syd'Quan played for the Denver Broncos.

On October 14, 2019, Thompson announced on his Twitter account that his mother had died, just hours after the Panthers' 37–26 victory against the Tampa Bay Buccaneers in London.

On November 27, 2021, along with three other players, Thompson was placed on the Panthers COVID-19 reserve list.
