= Scott Fitterer =

American football executive and agent (born 1973)

Personal information
- Born: November 4, 1973 (age 53); Seattle, Washington, U.S.

Career information
- Position: Quarterback
- High school: John F. Kennedy Catholic (Burien, Washington)
- College: UCLA (1993); LSU (1994–1995)

Career history
- New York Giants (1998–2000) Scout; Seattle Seahawks (2001–2010) Scout; Seattle Seahawks (2011–2014) Director of college scouting; Seattle Seahawks (2015–2019) Co-director of player personnel; Seattle Seahawks (2020) Vice president of football operations; Carolina Panthers (2021–2023) General manager; Washington Commanders (2024–2025) Personnel executive

Awards and highlights
- Super Bowl champion (XLVIII)
- Executive profile at Pro Football Reference

Scott Patrick Fitterer (born November 4, 1973) is an American professional sports agent and former football executive. He began his executive career as a part-time scout with the New York Giants in 1998 and worked in various executive roles with the Seattle Seahawks throughout the 2000s and 2010s. Fitterer served as general manager of the Carolina Panthers from 2021 to 2023 and worked as a personnel executive with the Washington Commanders for two seasons before joining the Athletes First talent agency in 2026.

== Early life ==
Fitterer was born on November 4, 1973, in Seattle, Washington, later attending John F. Kennedy Catholic High School in Burien, Washington. He played college football and baseball for the UCLA Bruins in 1993 and as a relief pitcher for the LSU Tigers in 1995. Fitterer was drafted by the Toronto Blue Jays in the 22nd round of the 1995 MLB draft and spent three years in the minor leagues with the St. Catharines Blue Jays, Hagerstown Suns, and Dunedin Blue Jays before shoulder problems ended his career.

== Career ==
=== New York Giants ===
Fitterer began his National Football League (NFL) executive career with the New York Giants as an area scout in 1998.

=== Seattle Seahawks ===
In 2001, Fitterer was hired by the Seattle Seahawks as an area scout. In 2011, he was promoted to director of college scouting. In 2016, Fitterer was promoted to co-director of player personnel. In 2020, he was promoted again vice president of football operations.

=== Carolina Panthers ===
On January 14, 2021, Fitterer was named the general manager of the Carolina Panthers. On January 8, 2024, Fitterer was fired by the Panthers.

=== Washington Commanders ===
Fitterer was hired as a personnel executive for the Washington Commanders on July 15, 2024.

=== Athletes First ===
Fitterer joined the Athletes First talent agency, working with coaches and executives, following the expiration of his contract with the Commanders in July 2026.

== Personal life ==
Fitterer is married to Cherish and they have two children, a daughter Ella and a son Cole.
