= Douglas Wigdor =

American lawyer

- Born: Douglas Wigdor; September 26, 1968 (age 58)
- Education: Washington University in St. Louis (BA); Columbus School of Law (JD); St Cross College, Oxford
- Occupation: Lawyer
- Employer: Wigdor LLP

Douglas Holden Wigdor (born September 26, 1968) is a founding partner of the law firm Wigdor LLP, and works as a litigator in New York City, specializing in anti-discrimination law. Wigdor is best known for representing seven victims of alleged sexual abuse by Harvey Weinstein, the hotel maid in the Dominique Strauss-Kahn sexual assault case, over twenty employees at Fox News in sexual harassment and discrimination cases, and NFL coaches Brian Flores, Steve Wilks, and Ray Horton in a 2022 class action lawsuit against the National Football League alleging racist and discriminatory practices against Black coaches.

== Education ==
Wigdor received his B.A. degree from Washington University in St. Louis where he now endows a scholarship to the Arts & Science School and where a cycling studio has been named after him. He received his J.D. degree from Catholic University of America Columbus School of Law and is a member of the International Tennis Club of the United States. He received a master's degree at St Cross College, Oxford University and was named the 2007 and 2014 Alumnus of the Year. The college has named the West Quad library and garden room after him and his wife Catherine, an alumna of Lincoln College, Oxford. At Oxford, he was on the university's 1995 national championship basketball team. Wigdor has lectured on university campuses as a guest lecturer and speaker.

== Early career ==
Wigdor clerked for Judge Arthur D. Spatt in the U.S. District Court for the Eastern District of New York for two years. He also worked as an attorney in the Suffolk County district attorney's office. From there, Wigdor moved to large corporate defense firm Morgan, Lewis & Bockius, where he mainly represented companies accused of discrimination.

Dissatisfied with his work defending management accused of wrongdoing, Wigdor founded his own plaintiff-side law firm in 2003 with fellow Morgan Lewis attorney Kenneth P. Thompson, who would later become the Brooklyn District Attorney. Later that year, Wigdor received a $7.5 million jury award against Wal-Mart, which was one of the largest yet under the Americans with Disabilities Act of 1990. Early in his career, Wigdor coined the phrase "recessionary discrimination" to describe the use of the economy as a pretext for discrimination.

== Notable cases ==
Among his cases, in 2009, he represented five women in a gender discrimination matter against Citibank, a case that appeared on the front cover of Forbes Magazine. In 2011, Wigdor represented Nafissatou Diallo, a housekeeper attacked in the Sofitel Hotel by Dominique Strauss-Kahn, the former head of the International Monetary Fund. In December 2020, Wigdor and Diallo both appeared in the Netflix original docu-series about the case, Room 2806: The Accusation.

In terms of discrimination cases against large financial groups, he has represented clients in a gender discrimination case against Dresdner and pregnancy discrimination cases against Goldman Sachs and Deutsche Bank. Other notable cases he has represented have included a racial discrimination case on behalf of actor Rob Brown against Macy's, and the representation of Charles Oakley against James Dolan and Madison Square Garden.

=== Harvey Weinstein cases ===
Wigdor has represented seven victims of alleged sexual misconduct by Harvey Weinstein. Three of Wigdor's clients, Wedil David, Kaja Sokola, and Dominique Huett, filed civil lawsuits alleging that they were sexually assaulted by Weinstein after he invited them to meet with him to discuss potential acting roles. Another client of Wigdor's, Tarale Wulff, testified during Weinstein's criminal rape trial in New York that Weinstein sexually assaulted her in 2005. Weinstein was convicted of criminal sexual assault and rape in the third degree, and received a sentence of 23 years in state prison.

After it was reported that Weinstein reached a tentative $25 million settlement agreement with his accusers, Wigdor publicly rejected the deal. Two other Weinstein accusers, Zelda Perkins and Rowena Chiu, later retained Wigdor to file their own objections to the proposed settlement. On July 14, 2020, one day after Wigdor filed a 36-page brief arguing that the proposed settlement was unfair to Weinstein's victims and should have been dismissed, U.S. District Judge Alvin K. Hellerstein held a 20-minute hearing in which he swiftly rejected preliminary approval of the settlement and denounced some of its terms as "obnoxious". Wigdor continued to represent clients in suits against Weinstein and other parties, including model Sara Ziff and Julia Ormond, both in 2023.

=== Sean Combs cases ===
In November 2023, Wigdor filed a sex trafficking and sexual assault lawsuit against Sean Combs on behalf of singer Cassie Ventura alleging she was lured into a professional and sexual relationship via drugs and alcohol, causing her to suffer addiction. The suit was settled one day later. His filing first introduced the term "freak off", which became the subject of a wider criminal investigation into Diddy's behavior and properties. When discussing the impact of the original suit on further investigations, Vanity Fair wrote that "If this framing was legitimately helpful—the suit contained detailed accounts of Combs's alleged abuse—it also spoke to Wigdor's facility for shaping public narrative."

=== NFL race discrimination class action ===
On February 1, 2022, Wigdor filed a race discrimination lawsuit against the NFL, New York Giants, Miami Dolphins, and Denver Broncos on behalf of former Dolphins head coach Brian Flores, in addition to Steve Wilks and Ray Horton. The lawsuit accused the NFL of conducting sham interviews with Black and minority head coach candidates in order to show compliance with the Rooney Rule. The complaint alleged that a series of text messages Flores received from New England Patriots coach Bill Belichick revealed the Giants decided to hire Brian Daboll as head coach three days before Flores was interviewed for the position. Flores also accused the Broncos of conducting a sham head coach interview with him in 2019. The lawsuit further claimed that Flores was pressured to tank games by Dolphins team owner Stephen Ross and offered $100,00 per game lost, and that he was also pressured to tamper with a quarterback. The three teams each denied Flores' allegations, while NFL commissioner Roger Goodell called the league's record on diversity "unacceptable" and vowed to reevaluate its diversity, equity and inclusion policies. Asked about the allegations in a pre-Super Bowl interview, President Joe Biden criticized the NFL for its lack of diversity among head coaches.

=== Fox News lawsuits ===
Beginning in 2016, Wigdor represented over 20 Fox News employees in sexual harassment, race discrimination, and gender discrimination cases, settling out of court for approximately $10 million. In November 2017, after 21st Century Fox made an offer to acquire Sky News for $14.6 billion, Wigdor testified before British Parliament and the Competition and Markets Authority about his knowledge of institutional workplace sexual harassment and discrimination at Fox.

On July 1, 2020, it was reported that Wigdor represented the victim in a sexual misconduct case that led to the termination of Fox News host Ed Henry. On July 20, Wigdor filed a federal lawsuit on behalf of Jennifer Eckhart alleging that Henry had sexually harassed and raped her. The lawsuit further alleged that Fox News supported and promoted Henry after it received multiple complaints of sexually inappropriate behavior against him, and only fired him once it became aware of a forthcoming lawsuit. Fox News on-air talent Sean Hannity, Tucker Carlson, Howard Kurtz and Gianno Caldwell were also accused of sexual harassment in the lawsuit.

=== Joe Biden sexual assault allegation ===
On May 8, 2020, it was revealed that Wigdor represented Tara Reade in her sexual assault allegation against Joe Biden. On May 11, Wigdor sent a letter to Biden urging him to authorize a search of his Senate papers housed at the University of Delaware for a copy of a sexual harassment complaint that Reade said she filed against Biden in 1993. Wigdor also pressed the Secretary of the United States Senate to authorize a similar search for documents related to the complaint. On May 22, it was reported that Wigdor's firm no longer represented Reade. Wigdor told the press that the decision was "by no means a reflection on whether then-Senator Biden sexually assaulted Ms. Reade" and that his views on the allegations had not changed.

=== Uber sexual assault cases ===
In 2015, Wigdor represented an Uber passenger who was kidnapped and raped by her driver in New Delhi. The case led to Uber being temporarily banned in New Delhi, and the company later introduced a panic button to its app in India. Two years later, Wigdor sued Uber on behalf of the victim, accusing the company's top executives of unlawfully obtaining and sharing her private medical records. One top executive was fired over the incident, and Uber's CEO at the time, Travis Kalanick, resigned one week after the lawsuit was filed.

=== Grammys corruption scandal ===
On January 21, 2020, five days before the 62nd Annual Grammy Awards ceremony, Wigdor filed a complaint with the EEOC on behalf of Deborah Dugan alleging that she was unlawfully stripped of her role as President and CEO of The Recording Academy in retaliation for her complaints of gender discrimination, voting irregularities, financial mismanagement and conflicts of interest at the Academy. The case prompted widespread controversy surrounding the credibility of the awards and reportedly caused Taylor Swift to cancel a surprise performance at the ceremony in solidary with Dugan. Hours before the ceremony, Wigdor publicly called on the Recording Academy to immediately reinstate Dugan as CEO. Alicia Keys, the ceremony's host, appeared to reference Dugan's allegations during her opening monologue. Other celebrity musicians who have publicly backed Dugan amid the controversy include Nicki Minaj, Sheryl Crow, Chuck D, and Tyler, the Creator. Later that year, The Weeknd accused the Recording Academy of ongoing corruption after his chart-topping studio album After Hours was shut out of the nominations for the 63rd Annual Grammy Awards.

=== NBC News sexual harassment investigation ===
On May 5, 2020, multiple media outlets reported that Wigdor represented several women in an investigation led by the New York Attorney General's office into sexual harassment allegations at NBC News, including Megyn Kelly and Linda Vester.

=== NY1 age and gender discrimination lawsuit ===
Wigdor represented five longtime female news anchors at NY1 in an age and gender discrimination lawsuit against Charter Communications, the station's parent company. The women accused Charter of cutting their airtime and giving them fewer opportunities for promotion compared to men and younger women. Global media attention in the lawsuit prompted the New York City Council to introduce legislation to combat ageism in the workplace.

On December 31, 2020, The New York Times reported that Wigdor reached a settlement with Charter that included the women leaving the station. After the settlement, the women accused Charter of retaliating against them by reneging on its promises to submit their work for Emmy Awards.

=== Goldman Sachs sexual misconduct lawsuit ===
Wigdor represented attorney Marla Crawford in a high-profile retaliation lawsuit alleging that Goldman Sachs's general counsel, Karen Seymour, covered up allegations of sexual misconduct by the investment bank's head of litigation toward a junior female colleague. Crawford claimed that investigators dismissed her attempts to come forward with relevant information about the conduct in question, followed by Goldman Sachs terminating her employment in an apparent effort to silence her. Seymour left the bank less than six months after the allegations surfaced.

High-profile lawyer Roberta Kaplan was criticized for her role defending Goldman Sachs in the case despite her work as the co-founder of the Time's Up Legal Defense Fund. After Kaplan sought to move the case from federal court into private arbitration Wigdor said it was "disappointing that she would agree to take such an anti-#MeToo position on Goldman's behalf."

=== Amazon race discrimination lawsuit ===
On March 1, 2021, Wigdor filed a lawsuit on behalf of Amazon Web Services manager Charlotte Newman revealing allegations that Amazon routinely underpaid and under-promoted Black employees in its corporate offices. The lawsuit accused Amazon of widespread "de-leveling" of Black employees by hiring them into lower roles than they qualified for. Newman also accused Amazon of downplaying her complaints that she was subjected to racial tropes and sexual harassment by coworkers and supervisors.

=== Other notable work ===
As a complainant himself, Wigdor brought a lawsuit against SoulCycle after being banned from the spinning studio subsequent to the representation of one of its former instructors.

Wigdor also represented the former Chief of Staff to Adam Neumann in a pregnancy discrimination complaint against WeWork.

In April 2020, Wigdor became a Forbes contributor and began publishing articles about employment discrimination, sexual harassment and whistleblower retaliation on the Forbes website. In January 2024, Douglas Wigdor filed a lawsuit against James Dolan, Harvey Weinstein, and related corporations alleging sex trafficking and sexual assault. The Plaintiff alleged she was manipulated into a sexual relationship with Dolan, and then sexually assaulted by Weinstein while working as a licensed massage therapist. In October 2024, Wigdor represented a sexual assault suit against Garth Brooks. He has also worked on a discrimination complaint against Intel.

== Awards ==
Law360 named Wigdor to its Titans of the Plaintiffs Bar list in 2019, calling him "among the most prominent litigators in the current nationwide reckoning on sexual misconduct".

In 2020, Wigdor received the New York Law Journal's Distinguished Leader award and landed on The Hollywood Reporter's Top 100 Power Lawyers list, a list he returned to in 2024. Wigdor was also named to Billboard's Top Music Lawyers list in 2020, 2021, and 2023.

Wigdor was awarded a Band 1 ranking by Chambers and Partners and has been named a Top 100 attorney in the New York metro area by Super Lawyers from 2007–09 and 2013-24. City & State named Wigdor to its annual Law Power 100 list in 2021, noting that he has "levied cases against some of the most powerful players in the business and political worlds – and won." Named to the same list in 2025, the publication wrote that, "Wigdor has shaped the national conversation on workplace accountability and his cases have led to corporate resignations, policy reforms and significant financial settlements that have transformed the workplace."

Wigdor's firm has received national recognition in U.S. News & World Report's annual law firm rankings and was named among the most fearsome litigation firms by BTI Consulting Group. His firm has also won The National Law Journal's Law Firm of the Year award in the categories of age discrimination, civil rights, employment rights, racial discrimination and sexual orientation discrimination. In 2021, Wigdor LLP received a Band 1 ranking from Chambers and Partners and was selected to the shortlist for Labor and Employment Law Firm of the Year by Chambers USA and has been ranked by the publication for six years. Wigdor was named to the Forbes Top 200 Lawyers list, and LawDragon's "500 Leading Lawyers in America" list in 2024.

In 2025 Billboard magazine ranked Wigdor on its list of "top music lawyers" for his role in what they deemed to be the music industry’s legal story of the year, through his representation of Cassandra Ventura. He was also named one of The Hollywood Reporter's Top 100 Attorneys in Hollywood on its Power Lawyers 2025 list.
