= Jodi Evans =

Canadian basketball player

Personal information
- Born: 16 August 1968 (age 57) Calgary, Alberta, Canada

Sport
- Sport: Basketball

Jodi Evans (born 16 August 1968) is a Canadian basketball player. Evans played for the Canada Women's National Basketball Team at the 1996 Summer Olympics. Evans made international headlines in 1993 as the first woman to represent the Oxford University men's basketball team in The Varsity Game against Cambridge University.

== University of Calgary Dinos ==
Evans was with the University of Calgary Dinos from 1987 to 1991. In 2005, she was inducted into the University of Calgary Hall of Fame.

== University of Oxford Blues (1991 to 1994) ==
Evans attended Oxford University as a Rhodes Scholar in 1991 and graduated with a DPhil in Management Studies. While at Oxford, Evans was a key member of the 1994 National Championship Oxford University Women's Basketball Team.

Evans made international headlines as the first woman to represent the Oxford University men's basketball team in The Varsity Game against Cambridge. She had previously been ruled ineligible to play in any B.S.S.F. men's league or tournament games in a controversial decision by the sport's governing body because she was a woman.

== National team career ==
Evans played for the Canada Women's National Basketball Team for nine seasons (1988-1996). She retired from International basketball after representing Canada at the 1996 Summer Olympics.

== Awards and honors ==
- Top 100 U Sports women's basketball Players of the Century (1920-2020).
- 2021 Inductee: Canada West Hall of Fame
