= Alex Koukouravas =

Welsh basketball player (born 1998)

No. 47 – Oxford Blues
- Position: Point guard
- League: British Universities & Colleges Sport

Personal information
- Born: 7 April 1998 (age 28) Cardiff, Wales
- Listed height: 6 ft 2 in (1.88 m)
- Listed weight: 165 lb (75 kg)

Career information
- College: SGS (2014–2016); Victory Rock Prep (2016–2017); Surrey (2017–2021); Oxford Blues (2021-present)
- Playing career: 2018–present

Career history
- 2018–2021: Surrey Scorchers

Stelios "Alex" Koukouravas (born 7 April 1998) is a Welsh professional basketball player who currently is the captain of and plays for the Welsh national team and the University of Oxford's Blues Basketball Team. He has previously played for Surrey Scorchers in the British Basketball League. Alongside his playing career, Koukouravas is a researcher in oncology at the University of Oxford, where he completed a master's by research and is undertaking a doctorate in the Department of Oncology. He is a co-author of research papers published in *Cell* (2024) and *Nature Cell Biology* (2026).

== College career ==
Koukouravas spent two years with South Gloucestershire and Stroud College and the Bristol Flyers Academy, before signing a scholarship with Victory Rock Prep in August 2016.

A year later, he joined the University of Surrey, where professional team the Surrey Scorchers play their home games. During his time at university, he represented Team Surrey Basketball in British Universities and Colleges Sport.

In 2021, Koukouravas joined Oxford University Men's Basketball Team known as the Blues. Koukouravas captained the Oxford University men's team during the 2022–23 season.

== Professional career ==
In September 2018, Koukouravas joined British Basketball League team the Surrey Scorchers.

== International career ==
Koukouravas has captained the Welsh national team at Under-16, Under-18, and Under-23 level. Koukouravas was named in the All Star 5 in 2016 for the FIBA Under 16 European championship Division C.. He is currently the captain of the senior men's team.

In May 2026, Koukouravas was named in the Wales men's 3×3 squad for the Commonwealth Games qualifying tournament, held at the National Basketball Performance Centre in Manchester from 22 to 24 May. Wales competed against England, Northern Ireland and the Isle of Man, with the tournament serving as qualification for the 2026 Commonwealth Games in Glasgow.

== Achievements ==
25+ senior international caps Captaincy at U16, U18 and U23 One bronze medals, FIBA European Championships Vincent's Adrian Mee Scholarship Four Blues All-Star Five selection
