= List of Carolina Panthers head coaches =

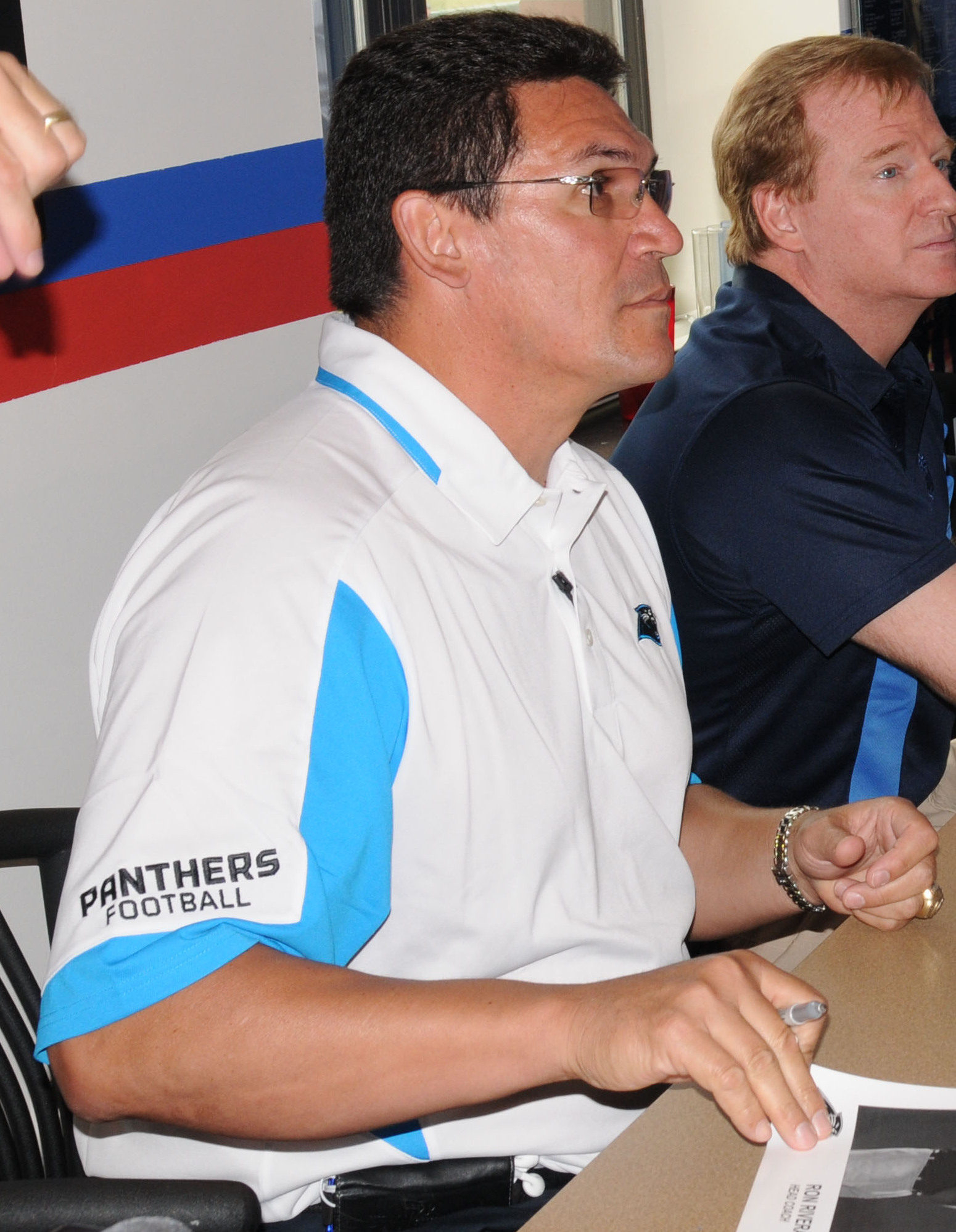
Ron Rivera (left), the fourth and former head coach of the Carolina Panthers, signing autographs with NFL commissioner Roger Goodell

The Carolina Panthers are a professional American football club based in Charlotte, North Carolina. They play in the southern division of the National Football Conference (NFC), one of the two conferences of the National Football League (NFL). Since the team began play in 1995, there have been ten (seven full-time and three interim) head coaches. In the NFL, head coaches are responsible for managing the team and setting the game plan; play-calling duties are either made by the head coach or delegated by him to an assistant coach.

The team's first head coach, Dom Capers, led the team for its first four seasons, recording a regular-season record of 30–34 (.469 winning percentage). in 1996. Capers was named coach of the year by Pro Football Weekly/PFWA in 1995 and 1996; he was also awarded coach of the year by several other organizations in 1996, including the Associated Press, the Maxwell Football Club, Sporting News, and United Press International. After Capers' dismissal following the 1998 season, the team brought in George Seifert as their second head coach. Over Seifert's three seasons the team never made the playoffs and the team had a regular-season record of 16–32 (.333 winning percentage). John Fox, the team's third coach, was the longest-tenured coach in team history. In his nine seasons as head coach the Panthers recorded a regular-season record of 73–71 (.507), the most wins for a head coach in team history, and a playoff record of 5–3. The team's fourth head coach, Ron Rivera, served nine seasons as head coach and had a record of 76–63–1 (.546) during his tenure, with a 3–4 record in the playoffs. Rivera has the highest winning percentage of any coach in team history. Rivera led the team to a record four playoff appearances, including three straight division titles.

Capers led the team to a playoff appearance in the 1996 season, winning once at home before losing in the NFC Championship Game to the Green Bay Packers. Fox led the team to three playoff appearances (2003, 2005, and 2008), winning the NFC Championship in 2003 before losing in Super Bowl XXXVIII to the New England Patriots and making the NFC Championship game in 2005 before losing to the Seattle Seahawks. Rivera led the team to three straight playoff appearances from 2013 to 2015, culminating in a loss in Super Bowl 50. He returned the team to the playoffs in 2017, losing in the Wild Card round.

On January 25, 2024, the team agreed to terms with Buccaneers offensive coordinator Dave Canales as the seventh full-time head coach in franchise history Thursday.

"Dave's background is rooted in success," Panthers owner David Tepper said. "He has an innovative mindset and positive energy that connects well with players and staff. We are impressed with his ability to bring out the best in players."

== Key ==
#	Number of coaches (Note: A running total of the number of coaches of the Panthers. Thus, any coach who has two or more terms as head coach is only counted once.)
Yrs	Years coached
First	First season coached
Last	Last season coached
GC	Games Coached
W	Wins
L	Loses
T	Ties
Win%	Win – Loss percentage
*	Spent entire NFL head coaching career with the Panthers

== Coaches ==
Note: Statistics are correct as of end of the 2025 NFL season.

#	Image	Name	Term (Note: Each year is linked to an article about that particular NFL season.)			Regular season					Playoffs			Accomplishments	Ref.
#	Image	Name	Yrs	First	Last	GC	W	L	T	Win%	GC	W	L	Accomplishments	Ref.
1		Dom Capers	4	1995	1998	64	30	34	0	.469	2	1	1	1 NFC West Championship (1996); 1 Playoff Berth; 1 AP NFL Coach of the Year (1996); 1 Earle "Greasy" Neale Award for Professional Coach of the Year (1996); 2 Pro Football Weekly/PFWA NFL Coach of the Year (1995, 1996); 1 Sporting News NFL Coach of the Year (1996); 1 UPI NFL Coach of the Year (1996)	
2		George Seifert	3	1999	2001	48	16	32	0	.333	—				
3		John Fox	9	2002	2010	144	73	71	0	.507	8	5	3	1 NFC Championship (2003); 2 NFC South Championships (2003, 2008); 3 Playoff Berths	
4		Ron Rivera	9	2011	2019 (Note: On December 3, Rivera was fired after nearly nine seasons as head coach and due to new ownership wanting a change within the organization.)	140	76	63	1	.546	7	3	4	1 NFC Championship (2015); 3 NFC South Championships (2013, 2014, 2015); 4 Playoff Berths; 2 PFWA and AP NFL Coach of the Year (2013, 2015)	
5		Perry Fewell	1	2019		4	0	4	0	.000	—				
6		Matt Rhule*	3	2020	2022 (Note: After a 1–4 start from the team, the Panthers fired head coach Matt Rhule. Rhule was replaced with defensive passing game coordinator Steve Wilks.)	38	11	27	0	.289	—				
7		Steve Wilks	1	2022		12	6	6	0	.500	—				
8		Frank Reich	1	2023 (Note: Following the team's Week 12 loss to the Tennessee Titans, not only did the Panthers fail to improve upon their 7–10 record from 2022, but they also fired Reich and named Chris Tabor as interim head coach.)		11	1	10	0	.091	—				
9		Chris Tabor*	1	2023		6	1	5	0	.167	—				
10		Dave Canales*	2	2024 – present		34	13	21	0	.382	1	0	1	1 NFC South Championship (2025); 1 Playoff Berth	
