= Oxford University Men's Basketball =

Oxford University Basketball Club
- Nickname: The Blues, The Dark Blues, The All-Americans
- Conference: BUCS Midlands Tier 2
- Leagues: BUCS
- Founded: 1921
- Arena: Iffley Road Sports Centre
- Capacity: 500
- Location: Oxford, England
- Team colors: Oxford Blue, White, and Silver
- Head coach: Florin Roman
- ABBA National Championship titles: 1956, 1966, 1968
- BUSF National Championship titles: 1965, 1966, 1967, 1971, 1972, 1975, 1976, 1977, 1983, 1984, 1985, 1986, 1991, 1992
- BSSF / BUSA / BUCS National Championship titles: 1992, 1993, 1995, 1999, 2001
- BUSA / BUCS League Championship titles: 1999, 2002, 2009, 2011, 2022
- Website: www.oubbc.weebly.com
Home	Road

The Oxford University men's basketball team represents the University of Oxford in the BUCS Basketball League and the National Basketball League (NBL). The team has won 19 National Championships, making it one of the most successful university basketball teams in the United Kingdom. The team is currently coached by Florin Roman.

Basketball has a long history at Oxford. The earliest record of basketball being played at the university was in 1893, just two years after the game's invention. The first known men's inter-varsity basketball team was selected in 1921, when it competed against the University of Cambridge in the inaugural Oxford-Cambridge Inter-Varsity Basketball Match.

== The 1940s ==
In 1947, Oxford assembled the first team of the post World War II era in response to an invitation from the Czechoslovak National Team to play ahead of the 1948 Olympic Games. In January 1948, the Blues embarked on an eight-game tour of Czechoslovakia. The Czechoslovak National Team beat Oxford 58–32 in the tour's opening game, but Oxford finished the trip with a 4–4 record.

The first post World War II Varsity Game was held on June 11, 1949, at RAF Halton. Oxford dominated their rivals with a 47–11 victory.

== The 1950s ==
In 1950, the A.B.B.A. selected the Oxford men's basketball team to play the London Latter Day Saints in a "curtain-raiser" match ahead of a Harlem Globetrotters fixture at the Empire Pool and Sports Arena, Wembley. Oxford's association with the Harlem Globetrotters would continue the following three years when the Oxford-Cambridge Inter-varsity Basketball Match was one of many rivalry games played before the Harlem Globetrotters games during their London tour. Oxford won each of those contests with as many as 10,000 fans in attendance.

In 1951, basketball earned the distinction of being a Half-Blue sport at the University of Oxford.

In 1956, a team captained by Fred Seigler that included future U.S. Senators Richard Lugar and Paul Sarbanes won the university's first ever A.B.B.A. National Championship.

== The 1960s ==
In 1963, the arrival of John Edgar Wideman had a major impact on the upward trajectory of the basketball program. In his first season, Wideman led Oxford to the A.B.B.A. National Championship Semi-Finals where they lost a two-point thriller (74-76) to eventual three-peat national champions London Central YMCA.

In 1964–65, Wideman's Blues advanced to the A.B.B.A. National Championship game against the Aldershot Warriors, the British Army team. The Warriors would win the first meeting 79–63, but this was just the beginning of a fierce rivalry between Oxford and the British Army that would last the rest of the decade.

In 1965–66, the arrival of NCAA Player of the Year Bill Bradley, having just been drafted by the NBA's New York Knicks, provided a much welcomed boost to an already talented roster. The Oxford Blues won the B.U.S.F. National Championship in December 1965 and, in March 1966, the team went on to win the A.B.B.A. National Championship 91–70 in a rematch against the Aldershot Warriors. Wideman was named A.B.B.A National Championship MVP. In 1966, the Oxford University Blues Committee elevated basketball to Full Blue status.

In 1966–67, Oxford University were considered favourites for the A.B.B.A. National Championship and had what Basketball magazine described as "undoubtedly the finest group of players in the country at present." On November 16, 1966, Oxford took on reigning EuroLeague Champions Simmenthal Milan in a game that was broadcast live on BBC. 500 fans packed themselves into Iffley Road Sports Centre to witness one of the most exciting games ever to be played at Oxford. Milan ended up edging Oxford 69–70 in a back-and-forth affair. The Blues retained their B.U.S.F. National Championship, however the team was denied the opportunity to defend their national title when they were disqualified for arriving late to their third-round game against London Central YMCA. According to Bill Bradley, the men's basketball team voted unanimously to forfeit the match in order to hear Robert F. Kennedy speak at the Oxford Union.

In 1967–68, Oxford claimed a third consecutive B.U.S.F. National Championship with a 71–37 win against Cambridge University in Birmingham. On March 16, 1968, an enthusiastic crowd of 1,400 fans filled Crystal Palace to watch the A.B.B.A. National Championship game. In a repeat of the 1966 Final, the Oxford Blues beat Aldershot Warriors 61–57. Tom Ward was named A.B.B.A National Championship MVP.

== The 1970s ==
In 1970, Oxford University missed out on a third A.B.B.A. national title, losing 67–73 in the championship final against the Liverpool and Bootle Police, led by legendary player-coach Jimmy Rogers. The following season (1970–71), Oxford suffered a shock early exit from the A.B.B.A. National Championship when they lost 65–67 to Manchester University.

In 1971–72, the arrival of 1970 NBA draft pick Heyward Dotson would change Oxford's fortunes. Dotson led the Blues to the 1971 B.U.S.F. National Championship, and a combined Oxford and Cambridge side, nicknamed "Oxbridge," to the final of the 1972 A.B.B.A. National Championship.

In 1972–73, the Blues maintained their dominance in British university basketball with a fifth B.U.S.F. National Championship.

== The 1990s ==
With its large contingent of Americans, the Dark Blues continued to dominate British university basketball throughout the 1990s. In 1989–90, under captain Mike Erdos, the Blues were runners-up to Loughborough in the B.U.S.F. National Championship. Under captain Rich Kortum, a former Duke University walk-on and Cambridge University star (the only player to have played for both Oxford and Cambridge), they followed this with back-to-back B.U.S.F. National Championships in 1990-91 and 1991–92, defeating Northern Ireland in both finals.

In 1993, Oxford also captured the B.S.S.F. (British Students Sports Federation) national title over heavily favoured defending champions Doncaster, 102–69, on the latter's home court. The Dark Blues' Duncan Ruckledge, a former England Under-19 star, was named tournament MVP.

In 1992–93, Oxford successfully defended its B.S.S.F national crown against arch-rival Cambridge. That year, Jodi Evans made international headlines as the first woman to represent Oxford University Men's Basketball team in the annual Varsity Match against Cambridge. Evans played 12 minutes and scored 4 points in the 86–64 loss. Evans, a member of the Canadian Women's National Team, had previously been ruled ineligible to play in any B.S.S.F. men's league or tournament games in a controversial decision by the sport's governing body because she was a woman.

The Blues won the B.U.S.A. National Championship in 1995.

Oxford's success on the hardwood continued through the late 1990s. In 1997–98, the Blues posted a 25–2 season record and a B.U.S.A. Final Four appearance. Oxford finished the following season in 1998–99 with a 24–1 record, capturing the B.U.S.A. national championship in a 73–61 win over Loughborough University.

== The 2000s ==
Following their 1999 National Championship, Oxford continued their dominance in British university basketball into the new millennium with another four straight trips to the B.U.S.A. Championship Final from 2000 to 2003. The 2000 championship game saw a rematch against Loughborough, which Oxford had beaten the previous year. This time Loughborough were the victors. Oxford regained the title in 2001, but couldn't out match the University of St Mark and St John in the 2002 and 2003 Finals.

== The 2010s ==
Oxford began the 2010s with a pair of B.U.C.S. Premier League South Division titles and consecutive appearances in the B.U.C.S. National Championship Final Four, where they lost to Leeds Metropolitan University in 2010 and Worcester in 2011.

Since 2011, the Blues have failed to advance further than the B.U.C.S. Super Eights.

In 2016, after a close back and forth duel in the annual Varsity Basketball Match, Cambridge beat Oxford by two points, 76–74.

In 2018, Oxford went winless (0-10) in the Premier League South and were relegated to B.U.C.S. Midlands League Division One.

The team continued to struggle in 2018–19. The Blues finished the season 3–7 in league play, in the bottom two of the league, and were demoted to B.U.C.S. Midlands League Division Two, and in the final Varsity Game of the decade, Oxford lost to Cambridge 69–81.

In 2019–20, the Blues had their first winning season in three years with a 7-6 overall record. The Blues finished in third place in B.U.C.S. Midlands League Division 2B with a 6-4 record and advanced to the second round of the Midlands Conference Cup. Oxford fell short against Cambridge in The Varsity Game with a final score of 65–71.

== The 2020s ==
The 2020s have seen a renaissance in basketball at Oxford University.

On 5 June 2020, Oxford University hired Great Britain Men's National Team assistant coach Jamie Smith as the new head men's basketball coach.

Despite the 2020-21 BUCS season being cancelled, the team participated in a meaningful programme of practices and games within Covid-19 restrictions. The Blues finished the season with a 7-3 (.700) record, the highest winning percentage since 2010-11. The Blues beat cross-town rival Oxford Brookes University for the first time since 2008-09. The 87-47 win over Brookes was the largest margin of victory in the 40-year history of the rivalry.

In 2021–22, the Blues finished the season with a 23-3 overall record, the most wins since 1998–99, and their first 20+ win season in over two decades. The Blues had a perfect 10–0 record in BUCS league play to be crowned BUCS Midlands 2A champions and earn promotion to tier one. They ended the season as winners of the Oxfordshire Basketball Association Cup for the first time since 1970–71.

In July 2022, the Oxford University Blues were invited to join the National Basketball League for the 2022–23 season. This would mark the first time Oxford University had competed in any national league competition since the 1965–66 season when they competed in the Southern Section of the British National Basketball League. This was the first time Oxford University has competed in Basketball England's NBL which was established in 1972. Oxford University began their inaugural National Basketball League campaign with a 3–0 record.

On 18 January 2023, Blues captain Josh Soifer scored a career high 58 points in a 117–60 win over Birmingham City University in BUCS league play. In doing so, Soifer broke the Oxford University single game scoring record which had stood for 66-years. The previous record holder was Willie Morris who scored 54 points against the Royal Air Force during the 1956–57 season.

On 11 March 2023, Oxford beat Cambridge 84–74 in The Varsity Game. This marked the first time Oxford had beaten Cambridge since 2018.

The Blues finished the 2022–23 season with a 26-17 overall record, the second most wins in the programme's 102-year history, and the first time the Blues had recorded back-to-back 20+ winning seasons since the 1997–98 and 1998–99 seasons.

On 16 August 2023, it was announced that Smith was stepping down as head men's basketball coach following the unexpected death of his father and a desire to return to the United States ahead of the 2024-25 season. Smith departed as the winningest coach in Oxford University Men's Basketball history.

On 26 September 2023, Greg Robertson was announced as Oxford University's new Head Men's Basketball Coach. Robertson relocated from St. Thomas, Canada to take the position. Despite being far from home, Robertson said the opportunity was a dream scenario and described his hiring as "an absolute honour."

The Blues earned their first win of the Greg Robertson era on November 22, 2023 with an 80-65 victory over City University of London in the first round of the B.U.C.S National Trophy.

From 9 February to 11 February 2024, The Blues competed in Tournoi Les Parisiennes 2024, an international multi-sport student competition. The Basketball tournament consisted of non-regulation 20 minute games played over a group stage and knockout stage. The Blues placed second, beating University College London in the semi-finals before falling to University of Glasgow in the championship game.

On 2 March 2024, Cambridge University defeated Oxford University 88-67 in The Varsity Game. The 21-point margin was the largest since 2015 when Cambridge won 91-66.

On 6 March 2024, Oxford lost to Loughborough 81-74 in their last league game of the season. The Blues finished the season 0-10 in BUCS league play.

On 23 October 2024, The Blues ended an 11-game BUCS league losing streak by beating University of Nottingham 74-51.

From 7 February to 9 February 2025, The Blues competed in Tournoi Les Parisiennes for the second year running, and improved on the previous year's second place finish by being crowned 2025 champions.

On 1 March 2025, Oxford beat Cambridge 87–69 in The Varsity Game. This marked the first Varsity Game win under Greg Robertson. The 18-point win was the highest margin of victory for Oxford in The Varsity Game since 2012 when Oxford beat Cambridge by 25 points.

On 29 June 2025, Oxford beat Oxford City Hoops 75-62 in the annual Town vs Gown fixture. This was the first win for the university in the marquee event since 2002. Mathias Rufino served as head coach for the Blues.

On 2 October 2025, Florin Roman was announced as Oxford University's New Head Men's Basketball Coach.

On 22 October 2025, The Blues opened their season with a 121-66 win over University of Staffordshire, their biggest margin of victory since a 117-60 win against Birmingham City in 2023.

== Traditions & Rivalries ==
Oxford University is renowned for its traditions, and its basketball club is no different. In addition to playing in BUCS, National League, and Oxford & District local league competitions, the Blues play a series of marquee fixtures against their longstanding rivals every season.

The Varsity Game (University of Cambridge) - Dating back to 1921, The Varsity Game is the oldest basketball competition still played in the United Kingdom, played between Oxford University and Cambridge University. The game is traditionally played at the end of the season and is the highlight of the basketball calendar at both universities.

Town vs Gown (Oxford City) - Annual fixture played in Hilary term between Oxford University (Gown) and the best team in the city of Oxford (Town). The first Town vs Gown match was played in 1983. The Gown lead the series 16–8. Since 2021, the Town has been represented by NBL Division II side Oxford City Hoops. Oxford City Hoops have won four out of five of these contests, but Oxford University are the current holders of the Town vs Gown trophy.

The Oxford Derby (Oxford Brookes University) - Annual two-game series between crosstown rivals Oxford University and Oxford Brookes University. Also known as the Headington Hill Head-to-Head because of the historic road that connects the two universities. The first matchup between the two teams was in 1981 when Oxford Brookes was still known as Oxford Polytechnic. Winners of the series win The Derby Cup.

Blues vs Twos (Oxford University Twos) - Since the 1960s, Oxford University has fielded a strong second team. The team competes in BUCS and local league competitions. The most notable Twos player was Bill Clinton who played during the 1968–69 season. During Michaelmas and Hilary term the Twos challenge the Blues to a basketball match. The Twos have never beaten the Blues. The closest they have come was in Michalelmas 2022 when the Blues won by seven points 65–58.

Soldiers vs Scholars (British Army Warriors) - Dating back to 1965 the Oxford University Blues have had a fierce rivalry with the British Army team, then known as the Aldershot Warriors. During the heyday of the rivalry, the Blues and the Warriors faced off in the English National Championship Final three times with the Army winning the national championship in 1965, and Oxford University taking the title in 1966 and 1968.

== Season Results ==
Record table
Season	Coach	Overall	Conference	Standing	Postseason
Michael Sarbanes (BUSF) (1987–1988)
1987-88	Michael Sarbanes	17-7			
Mike Erdos (BUSF) (1988–1990)
1988-89	Mike Erdos	13-4			
1989-90	Mike Erdos	19-3			
Richard Kortum (BSSF / BUSF) (1990–1992)
1990-91	Richard Kortum	20-4			BUSF National Champions / BSSF Championship Super Eight
1991-92	Richard Kortum	21-3			BUSF National Champions & BSSF Champions
Christopher Brown (BSSF / BUSF) (1992–1993)
1992-93	Christopher Brown				BSSF National Champions
Duncan Ruckledge, Captain (UAU / BUSF) (1993–1994)
1993-94	Duncan Ruckledge				BSSF National Champions
1994-95	Michael T. Benson	22-4			BUSA National Championship Super Eight
Tim Mau (BUSA) (1995–1996)
1995-96	Tim Mau	23-2	5-1		BUSA National Champions
David Lycett (BUSA) (1995–1996)
1995-96	David Lycett	9-10	3-3		BUSA National Championship Super Eight
B. Kris Kramer (BUSA) (1996–1998)
1996-97	B. Kris Kramer				BUSA National Championship Super Eight
1997-98	B. Kris Kramer	25-2			BUSA National Championship Final Four
Richard Parkes (BUCS) (1998–1999)
1998-99	Richard Parkes	24-2	8-0	1st	BUSA National Champions
Richard Parkes / Yehuda "Mookie" Mokades (BUCS) (1999–2000)
1999-00	Richard Parkes / Yehuda "Mookie" Mokades				BUCS National Championship Final Four
Yehuda "Mookie" Mokades (BUSA) (2000–2001)
2000-01	Yehuda "Mookie" Mokades				BUSA National Champions
Adam Popat (BUSA) (2001–2002)
2001-02	Adam Popat	19-4	10–0	1st	BUSA National Championship Runners-Up
Phil Kelly (BUSA) (2002–2004)
2002-03	Phil Kelly	15-5	8-2	2nd	BUSA National Championship Runners-Up
2003-04	Phil Kelly	11-4	9-4	4th	BUSA National Championship First Round
Michael Causey (BUSA) (2004–2006)
2004-05	Michael Causey	8-7	6-4	3rd	BUSA National Championship Super Eight
2005-06	Michael Causey	9-6	5-5	3rd	BUSA National Championship Super Eight
Dr John Fisher / Phil Kelly (BUSA) (2006–2007)
2006-07	Dr John Fisher / Phil Kelly	7-8	3–7	5th	BUSA National Championship Final Four
Phil Kelly (BUSA) (2007–2008)
2007-08	Phil Kelly	2-9	1–9	6th	
Brian Porth (BUCS) (2008–2009)
2008-09	Brian Porth	12-3	9–1	1st	BUCS National Championship Super Eight
Justin Hardin (BUCS) (2009–2011)
2009-10	Justin Hardin	12-3	8-2	2nd	BUCS National Championship Final Four
2010-11	Justin Hardin	12-3	9-1	1st	BUCS National Championship Final Four
Darryl Finkton (BUCS) (2011–2012)
2011–12	Darryl Finkton	7-8	5–5	3rd	BUCS National Championship Super Eight
Tim Weil (BUCS) (2012–2013)
2012–13	Tim Weil	5-7	5–5	4th	BUCS National Championship First Round
Matt McGilvray (BUCS) (2013–2014)
2013–14	Matt McGilvray	7-5	4–5	3rd	BUCS National Championship First Round
Alex Baron (BUCS) (2014–2015)
2014–15	Alex Baron	2-10	5–8	5th	BUCS National Championship First Round
Matt McGilvray (BUCS) (2015–2016)
2015–16	Matt McGilvray	8-6	5–5	4th	BUCS National Championship Super Eight
Vassilios Copetinas (BUCS) (2016–2019)
2016–17	Vassilios Copetinas	8-5	7–3	3rd	BUCS National Championship Super Eight
2017–18	Vassilios Copetinas	2-12	0–10	6th	BUCS National Championship First Round
2018–19	Vassilios Copetinas	4-9	3–7	5th	
Ben Constable (BUCS) (2019–2020)
2019–20	Ben Constable	7-6	6-4	3rd	No BUCS postseason held (COVID-19)
Jamie Smith (BUCS) (2020–2023)
2020–21	Jamie Smith	7–3	0–0	n/a	No BUCS season held (COVID-19)
2021–22	Jamie Smith	23-3	10–0	1st	OBA Cup Champions
2022–23	Jamie Smith	26-17	5–5	3rd	BUCS National Trophy First Round
Greg Robertson (BUCS) (2023–2025)
2023–24	Greg Robertson	1–13	0–10	6th	2nd place at Les Parisiene Tournament
2024–25	Greg Robertson	9–6	5–5	4th	Les Parisiene Tournament Champions
Florin Roman (BUCS) (2025–present)
2025–26	Florin Roman	14–2	10–0	1st	
2026–27	Florin Roman	0–0	0–0		
Total:		404–202 (.667)	248-111 (.691)		
National champion Postseason invitational champion Conference regular season champion Conference regular season and conference tournament champion Division regular season champion Division regular season and conference tournament champion Conference tournament champion

_{Only games played by official FIBA rules for a duration of 40 minutes with a stopping clock in regulation play are counted towards season records, team statistics, and individual statistics.}

== Oxford Blues in the NBA ==
George Munroe - St. Louis Bombers (1946–47), Boston Celtics (1947-48).

Bill Bradley - New York Knicks (1967-68 to 1976–77).

Heyward Dotson - Phoenix Suns (10th pick in 7th round of 1970 NBA Draft).

Tom McMillen - Buffalo Braves (1975-76 to 1976–77), New York Knicks (1976–77), Atlanta Hawks (1977-78 to 1982–83), Washington Bullets (1983-84 to 1985–86).

Glenn Fine - San Antonio Spurs (15th pick in 10th round of 1979 NBA Draft).

== Notable Oxford University Men's Basketball Alumni ==
George Rebh - United States Army General

Amos Jordan - United States Army General

Bernard Rogers - United States Army General

Edgar Shannon - President of the University of Virginia

George Munroe - NBA Basketball Player

Robert Massie - American Historian

Dr John Brademas - American Politician and President of New York University

Elliot Levitas - American Politician and Lawyer

Keith Conners - American Psychologist

Richard Lugar - US Senator

Paul Sarbanes - US Senator

Willie Morris - American Writer

Samuel C. O. Holt - Radio and Television Executive

Edwin Yoder - American Writer

Michael Hammond - American Musician

James Trefil - American Physicist

Charles Grimes - Olympic Rower

Edward Berman - American born British Social Activist and Community Educator

John Edgar Wideman - American Writer

Bill Bradley - NBA Basketball Player and US Senator

John Ritch - American Diplomat

William McGrew - Evolutionary Primatologist

Bill Clinton - President of the United States

Rick Mann - England National Team Basketball Player

Heyward Dotson - Professional Basketball Player and Lawyer

Willie Bogan - NFL American Football Player

Clayton Christensen - American Academic

Tom McMillen - NBA Basketball Player and American Politician

Robert McCallum Jr. - American lawyer, U.S. Associate Attorney General, 2003 -

Sir Steve Cowley - Theoretical Physicist

William J. Burns - Director of the Central Intelligence Agency, 2021 -

Glenn Fine - Inspector General of the Department of Justice

Mike Hoffman - Hollywood Director

Richard Cordray - 1st Director of the Consumer Financial Protection Bureau

James J. Collins - MIT bioengineer and MacArthur "genius"

Ben Sherwood - American writer, journalist, and producer

F. King Alexander - President of Oregon State University

James E. K. Hildreth - American Immunologist

Michael T. Benson - President of West Virginia University

Jodi Evans - Canadian Women's National Team Basketball Player

Peter Henry - American Economist

Cory Booker - US Senator

Douglas Wigdor - American Attorney

Philip Ryken - President of Wheaton College
