= Terrace Marshall Jr. =

American football player (born 2000)

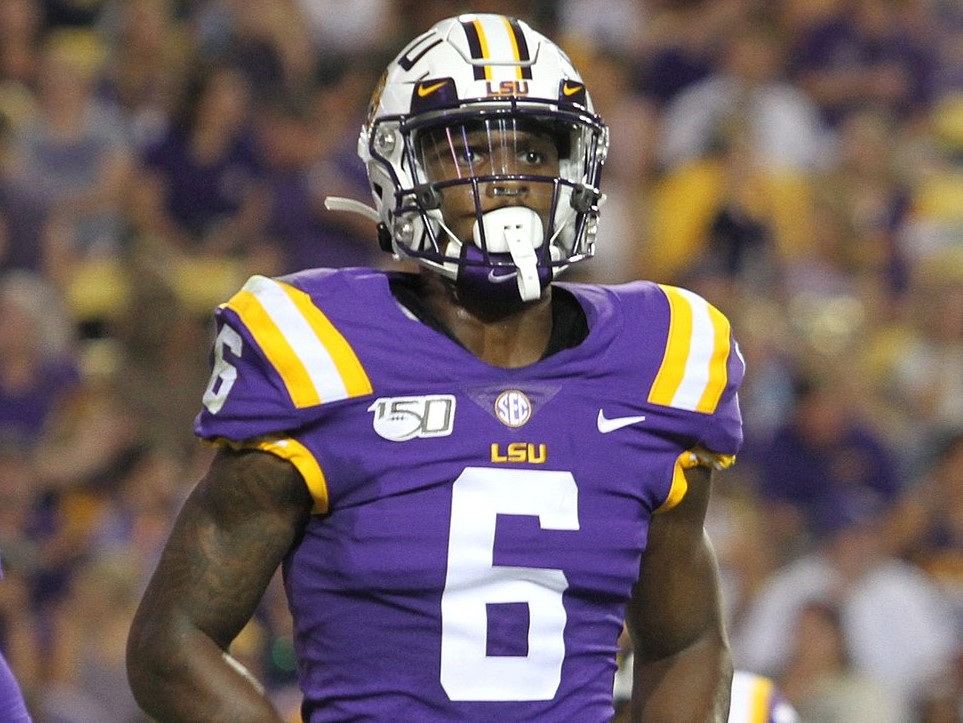
- Marshall Jr. with the LSU Tigers in 2019

Profile
- Position: Wide receiver

Personal information
- Born: June 9, 2000 (age 26); Bossier City, Louisiana, U.S.
- Listed height: 6 ft 2 in (1.88 m)
- Listed weight: 215 lb (98 kg)

Career information
- High school: Parkway (Bossier City)
- College: LSU (2018–2020)
- NFL draft: 2021: 2nd round, 59th overall pick

Career history
- Carolina Panthers (2021–2023); San Francisco 49ers (2024)*; Las Vegas Raiders (2024); Philadelphia Eagles (2025)*; Miami Dolphins (2026)*
- * Offseason or practice squad member only

Awards and highlights
- CFP national champion (2019)

Career NFL statistics as of 2024
- Receptions: 67
- Receiving yards: 808
- Receiving touchdowns: 1
- Stats at Pro Football Reference

Terrace Marshall Jr. (born June 9, 2000) is an American professional football wide receiver. He played college football for the LSU Tigers, and was selected by the Carolina Panthers in the second round of the 2021 NFL draft.

== Early life ==
Marshall attended Parkway High School in Bossier City, Louisiana. As a junior he had 55 receptions for 1,250 yards with 15 touchdowns and was named the Shreveport Times Male Athlete of the Year. He missed most of his senior season due to an ankle injury. Despite the injury he was still named a 2018 Under Armour All-American. A five star recruit, he committed to Louisiana State University (LSU) to play college football.

== College career ==
As a true freshman at LSU in 2018, Marshall played in 13 games with one start and had 12 receptions for 192 yards. He returned to LSU in 2019 as one of LSU's top three receivers along with Justin Jefferson and Ja'Marr Chase. Although he missed 3 games due to injury, he still managed to score 13 touchdowns, including 2 vs Georgia in the Southeastern Conference (SEC) Championship, 2 vs Oklahoma in the Peach bowl, and 1 vs Clemson in the College Football Championship game win. Against the Texas Longhorns, Marshall, Jefferson and Chase each had 100 receiving yards, the first time in school history three players had over 100 yards receiving.

On November 29, 2020, Marshall declared for the 2021 NFL draft and opted out of the remainder of the 2020 college football season. Up until that point, Marshall recorded 731 receiving yards and 10 receiving touchdowns (both third in the SEC) in seven games played.

== Professional career ==
Pre-draft measurables
Height	Weight	Arm length	Hand span	Wingspan	40-yard dash	10-yard split	20-yard split	Vertical jump	Broad jump	Bench press
6 ft 2 1/2 in (1.89 m)	205 lb (93 kg)	32 3/4 in (0.83 m)	9 1/2 in (0.24 m)	6 ft 6 1/8 in (1.98 m)	4.40 s	1.60 s	2.58 s	39.0 in (0.99 m)	10 ft 5 in (3.18 m)	19 reps
All values from Pro Day

=== Carolina Panthers ===
Marshall was selected by the Carolina Panthers in the second round (59th overall) of the 2021 NFL draft. On June 17, 2021, he signed his four-year rookie contract with Carolina, worth $5.7 million. As a rookie, he appeared in 13 games and recorded 17 receptions for 138 receiving yards.

In Week 9 of the 2022 season, Marshall recorded his first professional touchdown on a 21-yard reception in the team's 42–21 loss to the Cincinnati Bengals. He finished the 2022 season with 28 receptions for 490 receiving yards and one receiving touchdown in 14 games.

On August 27, 2024, Marshall was waived by the Panthers as part of final roster cuts.

=== San Francisco 49ers ===
On August 29, 2024, Marshall was signed to the San Francisco 49ers' practice squad. On October 15, Marshall was released by the 49ers.

=== Las Vegas Raiders ===
On October 22, 2024, Marshall was signed to the Las Vegas Raiders' practice squad. He was promoted to the active roster on November 28. In the 2024 season, he had three receptions for 41 yards.

=== Philadelphia Eagles ===
On April 11, 2025, Marshall signed a one-year deal with the Philadelphia Eagles. On August 26, he was released by the Eagles as part of final roster cuts and re-signed to the practice squad five days later. Marshall was released again on November 4. He was re-signed to the practice squad on December 1.

=== Miami Dolphins ===
Marshall signed a futures contract with the Miami Dolphins on February 4, 2026. On August 30, he was released by Miami as a part of final roster cuts.

== NFL career statistics ==
Legend
**Bold**	Career high

=== Regular season ===
Year	Team	Games		Receiving					Rushing					Fumbles	
Year	Team	GP	GS	Rec	Yds	Avg	Lng	TD	Att	Yds	Avg	Lng	TD	Fum	Lost
2021	CAR	13	3	17	138	8.1	23	0	0	0	0.0	0	0	0	0
2022	CAR	14	9	**28**	**490**	**17.5**	**43**	**1**	0	0	0.0	0	0	**2**	**1**
2023	CAR	9	4	19	139	7.3	14	0	0	0	0.0	0	0	1	**1**
2024	LVR	7	1	3	41	13.7	28	0	0	0	0.0	0	0	0	0
Career		43	17	67	808	12.2	43	1	0	0	0	0	0	3	2

== Personal life ==
His uncle, Joe Delaney, played in the NFL and died in 1983 attempting to rescue three children from drowning in a pond, before Marshall was born.
