= 2022 Carolina Panthers season =

28th season in franchise history

- Owner: David Tepper
- General manager: Scott Fitterer
- Head coach: Matt Rhule (fired October 10; 1–4 record); Steve Wilks (interim; 6–6 record)
- Home stadium: Bank of America Stadium

Results
- Record: 7–10
- Division place: 2nd NFC South
- Playoffs: Did not qualify
- Pro Bowlers: DE Brian Burns

Uniform
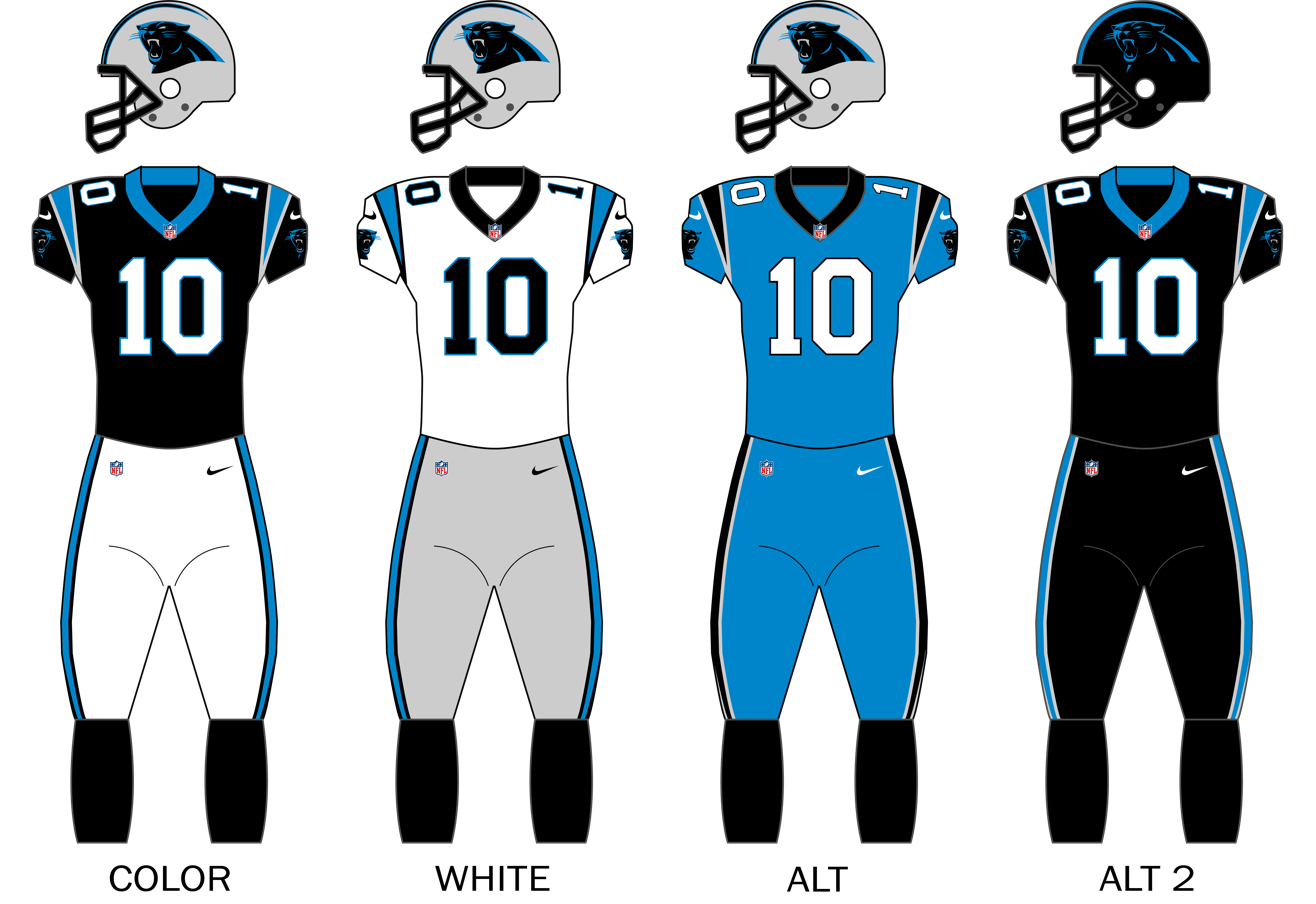

The 2022 season was the Carolina Panthers' 28th in the National Football League (NFL) and their third and final season under head coach Matt Rhule. They attempted to improve on their 5–12 record from last season and return to the playoffs for the first time since the 2017 season. After a 1–4 start from the team, the Panthers fired head coach Matt Rhule, along with defensive coordinator Phil Snow. Rhule was replaced with defensive passing game coordinator Steve Wilks, who served as the interim head coach for the remainder of the season. After a Week 16 win against the Detroit Lions, they improved on their five-win total from the previous three years. However, they were eliminated from playoff contention for the fifth straight year when they lost to the Tampa Bay Buccaneers the following week.

== Offseason ==
=== Signings ===
Position	Player	Age	2021 Team	Contract
C	Bradley Bozeman	27	Baltimore Ravens	1 year, $2.8 million
G	Austin Corbett	26	Los Angeles Rams	3 years, $26.2 million
RB	D'Onta Foreman	26	Tennessee Titans	1 year, $2 million
P	Johnny Hekker	32	Los Angeles Rams	3 years, $7.6 million
WR	Rashard Higgins	27	Cleveland Browns	1 year, $1.1 million
DT	Matt Ioannidis	28	Washington Commanders	1 year, $9.5 million
LB	Cory Littleton	28	Las Vegas Raiders	1 year, $2.6 million
LB	Damien Wilson	29	Jacksonville Jaguars	2 years, $6.9 million
FS	Xavier Woods	26	Minnesota Vikings	3 years, $15 million
WR	Andre Roberts	34	Los Angeles Chargers	1 year, $1.7 million

=== Draft ===
2022 Carolina Panthers Draft
Round	Selection	Player	Position	College	Notes
1	6	Ikem Ekwonu	OT	NC State	
2	38	Traded to the New York Jets (Note: The Panthers traded second- and fourth-round selections (38th and 111th overall), and a 2021 sixth-round selection to the New York Jets in exchange for QB Sam Darnold.)			
3	70	Traded to the Jacksonville Jaguars (Note: The Panthers traded TE Dan Arnold and a third-round selection (70th overall) to the Jacksonville Jaguars in exchange for CB C. J. Henderson and a fifth-round selection (144th overall).)			
3	94	Matt Corral	QB	Ole Miss	from Chiefs via Patriots (Note: The Panthers traded a fourth-round selection (137th overall) and a 2023 third-round selection to the New England Patriots in exchange for a third-round selection (94th overall).)
4	111	Traded to the New York Jets			
4	120	Brandon Smith	LB	Penn State	from Saints via Commanders (Note: The Panthers traded two fifth-round selections (144th and 149th overall) to the Washington Commanders in exchange for fourth- and sixth-round selections (120th and 189th overall).)
4	137	Traded to the New England Patriots			from Rams via Texans (Note: The Panthers traded a 2021 third-round selection to the Houston Texans in exchange for a fourth-round selection (137th overall), and 2021 fourth- and fifth-round selections.)
5	144	Traded to the Washington Commanders			from Jaguars
5	149	Traded to the Washington Commanders			
6	185	Traded to the Buffalo Bills (Note: The Panthers traded a sixth-round selection (185th overall) to the Buffalo Bills in exchange for DE Darryl Johnson.)			
6	189	Amaré Barno	LB	Virginia Tech	from Commanders
6	199	Cade Mays	OG	Tennessee	from Raiders (Note: The Panthers traded LB Denzel Perryman and a seventh-round selection (227th overall) to the Las Vegas Raiders in exchange for a sixth-round selection (199th overall).)
7	227	Traded to the Las Vegas Raiders			
7	242	Kalon Barnes	CB	Baylor	from Patriots via Dolphins (Note: The Panthers traded OT Greg Little to the Miami Dolpins in exchange for a seventh-round selection (242nd overall).)

Draft trades

=== Trades ===
Date	Trade partner	Panthers traded	Panthers received	Notes
July 6	Cleveland Browns	2024 Conditional 5th-round selection	QB Baker Mayfield	
August 29	Jacksonville Jaguars	2023 7th-round selection 2024 6th-round selection	WR Laviska Shenault	
August 29	Tennessee Titans	Dennis Daley; 2024 7th-round selection	2024 5th-round selection	

2022 Carolina Panthers undrafted free agents
Name	Position	College	Ref.
Josh Babicz	TE	North Dakota State	
Davis Cheek	QB	Elon	
Isaiah Graham-Mobley	LB	Boston College	
Drew Hartlaub	S	Penn State	
Ra'Shaun Henry	WR	Virginia	
Talolo Limu-Jones	WR	Eastern Kentucky	
John Lovett	RB	Penn State	
Marquan McCall	DT	Kentucky	
Arron Mosby	LB	Fresno State	
Andrew Parchment	WR	Florida State	
Charleston Rambo	WR	Miami (FL)	
Khalan Tolson	LB	Illinois	
Derek Wright	WR	Utah State	

== Staff ==
2022 Carolina Panthers staff
Front office: Owner – David Tepper; President – Kristi Coleman; General manager – Scott Fitterer; Assistant general manager – Dan Morgan; Vice president of football operations & senior advisor to ownership – Steven Drummond; Vice president of football administration – Samir Suleiman; Vice president of player personnel – Pat Stewart; Senior personnel executive – Jeff Morrow; Director of football operations – Mike Anderson; Director of college scouting – Cole Spencer; Director of pro scouting – Rob Hanrahan; Assistant director of pro scouting – Tyler Ramsey; Director of football analytics – Taylor Rajack; Head coaches: Interim head coach – Steve Wilks; Assistant head coach/offense – Jeff Nixon; Offensive coaches: Offensive coordinator – Ben McAdoo; Quarterbacks – Sean Ryan; Wide receivers – Joe Dailey; Tight ends – Kevin M. Gilbride; Offensive line – James Campen; Assistant offensive line – Robert Kugler; Pass game specialist – Matt Lombardi; Offensive assistant – Garret McGuire; Offensive assistant – Jody Owens	Defensive coaches: Interim defensive coordinator – Al Holcomb; Defensive run game coordinator – Mike Siravo; Defensive line – Terrance Knighton; Assistant defensive line – Don Johnson; Defensive backs – Bobby Mafei; Defensive assistant – Rob Dvoracek; Special teams coaches: Special teams coordinator – Chris Tabor; Special teams assistant – Cedric Whitaker

== Final roster ==
2022 Carolina Panthers roster
Quarterbacks (QB): 14 Sam Darnold; 6 P. J. Walker; Running backs (RB): 20 Raheem Blackshear; 33 D'Onta Foreman; 30 Chuba Hubbard; 45 Giovanni Ricci; Wide receivers (WR): 17 Rashard Higgins; 88 Terrace Marshall Jr.; 2 D. J. Moore; 18 Andre Roberts; 15 Laviska Shenault; 12 Shi Smith; 85 Preston Williams; Tight ends (TE): 84 Stephen Sullivan; 80 Ian Thomas; 82 Tommy Tremble	Offensive linemen (OL): 56 Bradley Bozeman C; 70 Brady Christensen G; 74 Larnel Coleman T; 63 Austin Corbett G; 79 Ikem Ekwonu T; 75 Cameron Erving T; 73 Michael Jordan G; 64 Cade Mays G/C; 72 Taylor Moton T; Defensive linemen (DL): 94 Henry Anderson DT; 90 Amaré Barno DE; 95 Derrick Brown DT; 53 Brian Burns DE; 97 Yetur Gross-Matos DE; 98 Marquis Haynes DE; 99 Matt Ioannidis DT; 78 Marquan McCall DT; 93 Bravvion Roy DT	Linebackers (LB): 47 Joel Iyiegbuniwe MLB; 55 Cory Littleton MLB/OLB; 49 Frankie Luvu OLB; 7 Shaq Thompson OLB; 57 Damien Wilson MLB; 50 Chandler Wooten MLB; Defensive backs (DB): 31 Juston Burris SS; 27 T. J. Carrie CB; 34 Sean Chandler SS; 21 Jeremy Chinn FS; 42 Sam Franklin Jr. SS; 38 Myles Hartsfield FS; 15 C. J. Henderson CB; 28 Keith Taylor CB; 25 Xavier Woods SS; Special teams (ST): 10 Johnny Hekker P; 44 J. J. Jansen LS; 4 Eddy Piñeiro K	Practice squad: 77 Deonte Brown G; 33 Spencer Brown RB; 13 Davis Cheek QB; 36 Madre Harper CB; 35 Gavin Heslop CB; 71 Phil Hoskins DT; 91 Kobe Jones DE; 46 Arron Mosby OLB; 6 Josh Norman CB; 29 Kenny Robinson FS; 81 C. J. Saunders WR; 68 Sam Tecklenburg C; 86 Colin Thompson TE; 92 Raequan Williams DT; 83 Derek Wright WR; Reserve: 9 Matt Corral QB (IR); 60 Pat Elflein C (IR); 5 Zane Gonzalez K (IR); 8 Jaycee Horn CB (IR); 26 Donte Jackson CB (IR); 32 Justin Layne CB (DNR); 40 Brandon Smith OLB (IR); 23 Stantley Thomas-Oliver III CB (IR); Rookies in italics 52 active, 8 reserve, 15 practice squad

== Preseason ==
Week	Date	Opponent	Result	Record	Venue	Recap
1	August 13	at Washington Commanders	W 23–21	1–0	Fedex Field	Recap
2	August 19	at New England Patriots	L 10–20	1–1	Gillette Stadium	Recap
3	August 26	Buffalo Bills	W 21–0	2–1	Bank of America Stadium	Recap

== Regular season ==
=== Schedule ===
Week	Date	Opponent	Result	Record	Venue	Recap
1	September 11	Cleveland Browns	**L** 24–26	0–1	Bank of America Stadium	Recap
2	September 18	at New York Giants	**L** 16–19	0–2	MetLife Stadium	Recap
3	September 25	**New Orleans Saints**	**W** 22–14	1–2	Bank of America Stadium	Recap
4	October 2	Arizona Cardinals	**L** 16–26	1–3	Bank of America Stadium	Recap
5	October 9	San Francisco 49ers	**L** 15–37	1–4	Bank of America Stadium	Recap
6	October 16	at Los Angeles Rams	**L** 10–24	1–5	SoFi Stadium	Recap
7	October 23	**Tampa Bay Buccaneers**	**W** 21–3	2–5	Bank of America Stadium	Recap
8	October 30	at **Atlanta Falcons**	**L** 34–37 (OT)	2–6	Mercedes-Benz Stadium	Recap
9	November 6	at Cincinnati Bengals	**L** 21–42	2–7	Paycor Stadium	Recap
10	November 10	**Atlanta Falcons**	**W** 25–15	3–7	Bank of America Stadium	Recap
11	November 20	at Baltimore Ravens	**L** 3–13	3–8	M&T Bank Stadium	Recap
12	November 27	Denver Broncos	**W** 23–10	4–8	Bank of America Stadium	Recap
13	Bye					
14	December 11	at Seattle Seahawks	**W** 30–24	5–8	Lumen Field	Recap
15	December 18	Pittsburgh Steelers	**L** 16–24	5–9	Bank of America Stadium	Recap
16	December 24	Detroit Lions	**W** 37–23	6–9	Bank of America Stadium	Recap
17	January 1	at **Tampa Bay Buccaneers**	**L** 24–30	6–10	Raymond James Stadium	Recap
18	January 8	at **New Orleans Saints**	**W** 10–7	7–10	Caesars Superdome	Recap

Note: Intra-division opponents are in bold text.

=== Game summaries ===
==== Week 1: vs. Cleveland Browns ====
Week 1: Cleveland Browns at Carolina Panthers – Game summary

Quarter	1	2	3	4	Total
**Browns**	0	17	3	6	**26**
Panthers	0	7	0	17	**24**

at Bank of America Stadium, Charlotte, North Carolina

- Date: September 11
- Game time: 1:00 p.m. EDT
- Game weather: Cloudy, 80 °F (27 °C)
- Game attendance: 72,205
- Referee: Brad Rogers
- TV announcers (CBS): Spero Dedes, Jay Feely and Aditi Kinkhabwala
- Recap, Game Book

Game information

**First quarter**

- No scoring plays.

**Second quarter**

- CLE – Kareem Hunt 1-yard pass from Jacoby Brissett (Cade York kick), 10:49. Browns 7–0. **Drive: 3 plays, 42 yards, 1:37.**
- CLE – Kareem Hunt 24-yard run (Cade York kick), 4:46. Browns 14–0. **Drive: 8 plays, 78 yards, 4:33.**
- CAR – Christian McCaffrey 1-yard run (Eddy Piñeiro kick), 1:57. Browns 14–7. **Drive: 6 plays, 75 yards, 2:49.**
- CLE – Cade York 26-yard field goal, 0:21. Browns 17–7. **Drive: 9 plays, 52 yards, 1:36.**

**Third quarter**

- CLE – Cade York 34-yard field goal, 7:42. Browns 20–7. **Drive: 13 plays, 58 yards, 7:18.**

**Fourth quarter**

- CAR – Baker Mayfield 7-yard run (Eddy Piñeiro kick), 12:51. Browns 20–14. **Drive: 11 plays, 75 yards, 4:44.**
- CLE – Cade York 36-yard field goal, 6:14. Browns 23–14. **Drive: 10 plays, 57 yards, 6:38.**
- CAR – Robbie Anderson 75-yard pass from Baker Mayfield (Eddy Piñeiro kick), 6:02. Browns 23–21. **Drive: 1 play, 75 yards, 0:11.**
- CAR – Eddy Piñeiro 34-yard field goal, 1:13. Panthers 24–23. **Drive: 7 plays, 64 yards, 1:01.**
- CLE – Cade York 58-yard field goal, 0:08. Browns 26–24. **Drive: 6 plays, 35 yards, 1:05.**

**Top passers**

- CLE – Jacoby Brissett – 18/34, 147 yards, TD
- CAR – Baker Mayfield – 16/27, 235 yards, TD, INT

**Top rushers**

- CLE – Nick Chubb – 22 rushes, 141 yards
- CAR – Christian McCaffrey – 10 rushes, 33 yards, TD

**Top receivers**

- CLE – Donovan Peoples-Jones – 6 receptions, 60 yards
- CAR – Robbie Anderson – 5 receptions, 102 yards, TD

In the Panthers' home opener against the Cleveland Browns, they came close to winning, but the Browns were able to hold them off. Cleveland defeated Carolina 26–24, meaning the Panthers started off the season 0–1.

==== Week 2: at New York Giants ====
Week 2: Carolina Panthers at New York Giants – Game summary

Quarter	1	2	3	4	Total
Panthers	0	6	7	3	**16**
**Giants**	6	0	7	6	**19**

at MetLife Stadium, East Rutherford, New Jersey

- Date: September 18
- Game time: 1:00 p.m. EDT
- Game weather: Fair, 73 °F (23 °C)
- Game attendance: 73,843
- Referee: Ronald Torbert
- TV announcers (Fox): Joe Davis, Daryl Johnston and Pam Oliver
- Recap, Game Book

Game information

**First quarter**

- NYG – Graham Gano 36-yard field goal, 12:50. Giants 3–0. **Drive: 4 plays, 4 yards, 2:02.**
- NYG – Graham Gano 33-yard field goal, 2:30. Giants 6–0. **Drive: 13 plays, 25 yards, 7:47.**

**Second quarter**

- CAR – Eddy Piñeiro 31-yard field goal, 12:15. Giants 6–3. **Drive: 13 plays, 58 yards, 5:15.**
- CAR – Eddy Piñeiro 32-yard field goal, 0:56. Tied 6–6. **Drive: 10 plays, 34 yards, 4:23.**

**Third quarter**

- CAR – D. J. Moore 16-yard pass from Baker Mayfield (Eddy Piñeiro kick), 12:27. Panthers 13–6. **Drive: 3 plays, 67 yards, 1:00.**
- NYG – Daniel Bellinger 16-yard pass from Daniel Jones (Graham Gano kick), 9:19. Tied 13–13. **Drive: 8 plays, 75 yards, 3:08.**

**Fourth quarter**

- NYG – Graham Gano 51-yard field goal, 12:31. Giants 16–13. **Drive: 9 plays, 58 yards, 3:24.**
- CAR – Eddy Piñeiro 38-yard field goal, 10:46. Tied 16–16. **Drive: 5 plays, 55 yards, 1:45.**
- NYG – Graham Gano 56-yard field goal, 3:34. Giants 19–16. **Drive: 11 plays, 37 yards, 7:12.**

**Top passers**

- CAR – Baker Mayfield – 14/29, 145 yards, TD
- NYG – Daniel Jones – 22/34, 176 yards, TD

**Top rushers**

- CAR – Christian McCaffrey - 15 rushes, 102 yards
- NYG – Saquon Barkley - 21 rushes, 72 yards

**Top receivers**

- CAR – D. J. Moore – 3 receptions, 43 yards, TD
- NYG – Richie James – 5 receptions, 51 yards

This was head coach Matt Rhule's first return to MetLife Stadium in 10 years, as he had previously served as the Giants' assistant offensive line coach under then-head coach Tom Coughlin in 2012, a season after the Giants won their 4th Super Bowl title. Things started poorly for the Panthers when, during kick-off, Chuba Hubbard fumbled the ball, and it was recovered by the New York Giants. New York ended up scoring a field goal on the ensuing drive. When Carolina got the ball back, they would fumble again and the Giants scored another field goal. In the second quarter, Eddy Piñeiro scored two field goals for the Panthers, tying the game. Baker Mayfield made a complete pass to D. J. Moore in the third for a touchdown. The Giants answered back with a Daniel Bellinger touch down, tying the game at 13–13 going into the 4th quarter. The Panthers only scored three points in the fourth, while New York scored 6, giving the Giants a 19–16 win, dropping the Panthers to an 0–2 record.

==== Week 3: vs. New Orleans Saints ====
Week 3: New Orleans Saints at Carolina Panthers – Game summary

Quarter	1	2	3	4	Total
Saints	0	0	0	14	**14**
**Panthers**	7	6	0	9	**22**

at Bank of America Stadium, Charlotte, North Carolina

- Date: September 25
- Game time: 1:00 p.m. EDT
- Game weather: Partly cloudy, 68 °F (20 °C)
- Game attendance: 70,496
- Referee: Carl Cheffers
- TV announcers (Fox): Dan Hellie, Matt Millen and Lindsay Czarniak
- Recap, Game Book

Game information

**First quarter**

- CAR – Marquis Haynes 44-yard fumble return (Eddy Piñeiro kick), 5:32. Panthers 7–0.

**Second quarter**

- CAR – Eddy Piñeiro 45-yard field goal, 14:16. Panthers 10–0. **Drive: 10 plays, 40 yards, 5:10.**
- CAR – Eddy Piñeiro 48-yard field goal, 2:56. Panthers 13–0. **Drive: 10 plays, 52 yards, 5:36.**

**Third quarter**

- No scoring plays.

**Fourth quarter**

- NO – Mark Ingram II 5-yard run (Wil Lutz kick), 12:31. Panthers 13–7. **Drive: 10 plays, 89 yards, 3:28.**
- CAR – Laviska Shenault 67-yard pass from Baker Mayfield (run failed), 12:06. Panthers 19–7. **Drive: 2 plays, 67 yards, 0:25.**
- CAR – Eddy Piñeiro 34-yard field goal, 8:19. Panthers 22–7. **Drive: 7 plays, 19 yards, 3:00.**
- NO – Marquez Callaway 4-yard pass from Jameis Winston (Wil Lutz kick), 2:22. Panthers 22–14. **Drive: 3 plays, 90 yards, 1:06.**

**Top passers**

- NO – Jameis Winston – 25/41, 353 yards, TD, 2 INT
- CAR – Baker Mayfield – 12/25, 170 yards, TD

**Top rushers**

- NO – Alvin Kamara – 15 rushes, 61 yards
- CAR – Christian McCaffrey – 25 rushes, 108 yards

**Top receivers**

- NO – Chris Olave – 9 receptions, 147 yards
- CAR – Laviska Shenault – 2 receptions, 90 yards, TD

The game started off well for Carolina in the first quarter when New Orleans fumbled the ball. Marquis Haynes recovered it and scored a fumble recovery touchdown for the Panthers. Carolina led by thirteen points at the half after Eddy Piñeiro kicked two field goals in the second quarter. Early in the fourth, Mark Ingram scores a touchdown for the Saints, giving them their first points of the game. Baker Mayfield completes a 67-yard pass to Laviska Shenault for a touchdown. They tried for a two-point conversion, but it failed. With 8:19 to go into the game, Piñeiro kicked another field goal for Carolina. With 2:22 remaining, Marquez Callaway scores a touchdown for the Saints, though it was not enough. Carolina defeated New Orleans 22–14, snapping a 9-game losing streak and improving to 1–2.

==== Week 4: vs. Arizona Cardinals ====
Week 4: Arizona Cardinals at Carolina Panthers – Game summary

Quarter	1	2	3	4	Total
**Cardinals**	0	3	7	16	**26**
Panthers	0	10	0	6	**16**

at Bank of America Stadium, Charlotte, North Carolina

- Date: October 2
- Game time: 4:05 p.m. EDT
- Game weather: Mostly cloudy, 65 °F (18 °C)
- Game attendance: 69,810
- Referee: John Hussey
- TV announcers (Fox): Kenny Albert, Jonathan Vilma and Shannon Spake
- Recap, Game Book

Game information

**First quarter**

- No scoring plays.

**Second quarter**

- CAR – Frankie Luvu 33-yard interception return (Eddy Piñeiro kick), 12:13. Panthers 7–0.
- ARI – Matt Prater 33-yard field goal, 3:34. Panthers 7–3. **Drive: 8 plays, 50 yards, 3:19.**
- CAR – Eddy Piñeiro 54-yard field goal, 3:34. Panthers 10–3. **Drive: 5 plays, 29 yards, 0:21.**

**Third quarter**

- ARI – Zach Ertz 2-yard pass from Kyler Murray (Matt Prater kick), 7:42. Tied 10–10. **Drive: 9 plays, 89 yards, 5:08.**

**Fourth quarter**

- ARI – Matt Prater 39-yard field goal, 3:34. Cardinals 13–10. **Drive: 15 plays, 57 yards, 9:26.**
- ARI - Kyler Murray 4-yard run (Matt Prater kick), 10:26. Cardinals 20–10. **Drive: 2 plays, 5 yards, 0:42**
- ARI – Marquise Brown 23-yard pass from Kyler Murray (pass failed), 7:37. Cardinals 26–10. **Drive: 3 plays, 31 yards, 1:36.**
- CAR – Christian McCaffrey 13-yard pass from Baker Mayfield (pass failed), 4:47. Cardinals 26–16. **Drive: 9 plays, 74 yards, 2:50.**

**Top passers**

- ARI – Kyler Murray – 23/32, 207 yards, 2 TD, INT
- CAR – Baker Mayfield – 22/36, 197 yards, TD, 2 INT

**Top rushers**

- ARI – James Conner – 15 rushes, 55 yards
- CAR – Christian McCaffrey – 8 rushes, 27 yards

**Top receivers**

- ARI – Marquise Brown – 6 receptions, 88 yards, TD
- CAR – Christian McCaffrey – 9 receptions, 81 yards, TD

The Cardinals end up being too much for the Panthers and defeat them 26–16. Carolina falls to 1–3.

==== Week 5: vs. San Francisco 49ers ====
Week 5: San Francisco 49ers at Carolina Panthers – Game summary

Quarter	1	2	3	4	Total
**49ers**	7	10	7	13	**37**
Panthers	0	3	9	3	**15**

at Bank of America Stadium, Charlotte, North Carolina

- Date: October 9
- Game time: 4:05 p.m. EDT
- Game weather: Sunny, 68 °F (20 °C)
- Game attendance: 72,321
- Referee: Shawn Smith
- TV announcers (CBS): Ian Eagle, Charles Davis and Evan Washburn
- Recap, Game Book

Game information

**First quarter**

- SF – Tevin Coleman 9-yard pass from Jimmy Garoppolo (Robbie Gould kick), 11:40. 49ers 7–0. **Drive: 7 plays, 75 yards, 3:20.**

**Second quarter**

- SF – Robbie Gould 49-yard field goal, 12:56. 49ers 10–0. **Drive: 8 plays, 38 yards, 4:14.**
- CAR – Eddy Pineiro 43-yard field goal, 7:59. 49ers 10–3. **Drive: 9 plays, 53 yards, 4:27.**
- SF – Emmanuel Moseley 41-yard interception return (Robbie Gould kick), 0:43. 49ers 17–3.

**Third quarter**

- CAR – Christian McCaffrey 19-yard run (run failed), 11:57. 49ers 17–9. **Drive: 7 plays, 51 yards, 3:03.**
- SF – Deebo Samuel 4-yard pass from Jimmy Garoppolo (Robbie Gould kick), 6:32. 49ers 24–9. **Drive: 10 plays, 75 yards, 5:25.**
- CAR – Eddy Pineiro 37-yard field goal, 3:40. 49ers 24–12. **Drive: 6 plays, 31 yards, 2:52.**

**Fourth quarter**

- SF – Jeff Wilson Jr. 1-yard run (kick failed, wide left), 12:31. 49ers 30–12. **Drive: 12 plays, 75 yards, 6:09.**
- CAR – Eddy Pineiro 34-yard field goal, 6:51. 49ers 30–15. **Drive: 12 plays, 59 yards, 5:40.**
- SF – Tevin Coleman 5-yard run (Mitch Wishnowsky kick), 3:15. 49ers 37–15. **Drive: 2 plays, 3 yards, 0:51.**

**Top passers**

- SF – Jimmy Garoppolo – 18/30, 253 yards, 2 TD
- CAR – Baker Mayfield – 20/36, 215 yards, INT

**Top rushers**

- SF – Jeff Wilson Jr. – 17 rushes, 120 TD
- CAR – Christian McCaffrey – 14 rushes, 54 yards, TD

**Top receivers**

- SF – Brandon Aiyuk – 3 receptions, 58 yards
- CAR – Shi Smith – 4 receptions, 69 yards

The Panthers lose to San Francisco 15–37 and dropped to 1–4 on the year. This was head coach Matt Rhule's and defensive coordinator Phil Snow's last game with the Panthers, as both were fired in the days following the loss with Steve Wilks promoted to interim head coach. In addition, Baker Mayfield, who had another disappointing performance, was benched in favor of P. J. Walker.

==== Week 6: at Los Angeles Rams ====
Week 6: Carolina Panthers at Los Angeles Rams – Game summary

Quarter	1	2	3	4	Total
Panthers	3	7	0	0	**10**
**Rams**	0	7	10	7	**24**

at SoFi Stadium, Inglewood, California

- Date: October 16
- Game time: 4:05 p.m. EDT/1:05 p.m. PDT
- Game weather: Cloudy, 72 °F (22 °C)
- Game attendance: 71,482
- Referee: Tra Blake
- TV announcers (Fox): Kevin Kugler, Mark Sanchez and Laura Okmin
- Recap, Game Book

Game information

**First quarter**

- CAR – Eddy Piñeiro 42-yard field goal, 8:38. Panthers 3–0. **Drive: 12 plays, 51 yards, 6:22.**

**Second quarter**

- LAR – Allen Robinson 5-yard pass from Matthew Stafford (Matt Gay kick), 3:34. Rams 7–3. **Drive: 13 plays, 73 yards, 7:58.**
- CAR – Donte Jackson 30-yard interception return (Eddy Piñeiro kick), 1:58. Panthers 10–7.

**Third quarter**

- LAR – Matt Gay 21-yard field goal, 4:37. Tied 10–10. **Drive: 12 plays, 87 yards, 6:46.**
- LAR – Ben Skowronek 17-yard run (Matt Gay kick), 0:11. Rams 17–10. **Drive: 5 plays, 80 yards, 2:50.**

**Fourth quarter**

- LAR – Darrell Henderson 2-yard run (Matt Gay kick), 8:15. Rams 24–10. **Drive: 10 plays, 61 yards, 5:17.**

**Top passers**

- CAR – P. J. Walker – 10/16, 60 yards
- LAR – Matthew Stafford – 26/33, 253 yards, TD, INT

**Top rushers**

- CAR – Christian McCaffrey – 13 rushes, 69 yards
- LAR – Darrell Henderson – 13 rushes, 43 yards, TD

**Top receivers**

- CAR – Christian McCaffrey – 7 receptions, 89 yards
- LAR – Cooper Kupp – 7 receptions, 80 yards

Carolina started the game off with a field goal in the first. Both the Panthers and the Rams scored touchdowns in the second, leaving them up 10-7 into the half. The Panthers went scoreless in the second half, while Los Angeles took control and scored 17. The Rams defeated Carolina 24–10. For the first time since 2016, the Panthers were 1–5. This was also the last game Christian McCaffrey played in as a player of the Panthers, as he was traded to the San Francisco 49ers on October 20, 2022.

==== Week 7: vs. Tampa Bay Buccaneers ====
Week 7: Tampa Bay Buccaneers at Carolina Panthers – Game summary

Quarter	1	2	3	4	Total
Buccaneers	0	0	0	3	**3**
**Panthers**	0	7	7	7	**21**

at Bank of America Stadium, Charlotte, North Carolina

- Date: October 23
- Game time: 1:00 p.m. EDT
- Game weather: Sunny, 67 °F (19 °C)
- Game attendance: 71,941
- Referee: Craig Wrolstad
- TV announcers (Fox): Kenny Albert, Jonathan Vilma and Shannon Spake
- Recap, Game Book

Game information

**First quarter**

- No scoring plays.

**Second quarter**

- CAR – D. J. Moore 20-yard pass from P. J. Walker (Eddy Piñeiro kick), 0:29. Panthers 7–0. **Drive: 6 plays, 80 yards, 2:47.**

**Third quarter**

- CAR – Chuba Hubbard 17-yard run (Eddy Piñeiro kick), 3:11. Panthers 14–0. **Drive: 3 plays, 77 yards, 0:49.**

**Fourth quarter**

- TB – Ryan Succop 27-yard field goal, 13:38. Panthers 14–3. **Drive: 14 plays, 67 yards, 4:33.**
- CAR – Tommy Tremble 29-yard pass from P. J. Walker (Eddy Piñeiro kick), 9:33. Panthers 21–3. **Drive: 7 plays, 75 yards, 4:05.**

**Top passers**

- TB – Tom Brady – 32/49, 290 yards
- CAR – P. J. Walker – 16/22, 177 yards, 2 TD

**Top rushers**

- TB – Rachaad White – 6 rushes, 24 yards
- CAR – D'Onta Foreman – 15 rushes, 118 yards

**Top receivers**

- TB – Mike Evans – 9 receptions, 96 yards
- CAR – D. J. Moore – 7 receptions, 69 yards, TD

Carolina and Tampa Bay were both scoreless in the first quarter. With 35 seconds to go in the second, P. J. Walker made a 20-yard pass to D. J. Moore for a Panthers touchdown, putting Carolina up by 7 at the half. Chuba Hubbard scored a touchdown in the third, as Ryan Succop made a field goal for the Bucs in the fourth. Walker threw it to Tommy Tremble for a game sealing touchdown. The Panthers won 21–3 and improved to 2–5.

==== Week 8: at Atlanta Falcons ====
Week 8: Carolina Panthers at Atlanta Falcons – Game summary

Quarter	1	2	3	4	OT	Total
Panthers	3	7	3	21	0	**34**
**Falcons**	0	14	7	13	3	**37**

at Mercedes-Benz Stadium, Atlanta, Georgia

- Date: October 30
- Game time: 1:00 p.m. EDT
- Game weather: None (retractable roof closed)
- Game attendance: 68,996
- Referee: Shawn Hochuli
- TV announcers (Fox): Kenny Albert, Jonathan Vilma and Shannon Spake
- Recap, Game Book

Game information

**First quarter**

- CAR – Eddy Piñeiro 37-yard field goal, 6:50. Panthers 3–0. **Drive: 6 plays, 18 yards, 2:33.**

**Second quarter**

- ATL – Kyle Pitts 2-yard pass from Marcus Mariota (Younghoe Koo kick), 10:13. Falcons 7–3. **Drive: 10 plays, 69 yards, 6:02.**
- CAR – D'Onta Foreman 2-yard run (Eddy Piñeiro kick), 4:51. Panthers 10–7. **Drive: 12 plays, 75 yards, 5:22.**
- ATL – Lorenzo Carter 28-yard interception return (Younghoe Koo kick), 0:41. Falcons 14–10.

**Third quarter**

- CAR – Eddy Piñeiro 42-yard field goal, 11:33. Falcons 14–13. **Drive: 9 plays, 51 yards, 3:27.**
- ATL – Tyler Allgeier 25-yard pass from Marcus Mariota (Younghoe Koo kick), 1:40. Falcons 21–13. **Drive: 8 plays, 62 yards, 4:45.**

**Fourth quarter**

- CAR – D'Onta Foreman 1-yard run (D'Onta Foreman run), 11:46. Tied 21–21. **Drive: 10 plays, 75 yards, 4:54.**
- ATL – Younghoe Koo 30-yard field goal, 7:33. Falcons 24–21. **Drive: 8 plays, 68 yards, 4:13.**
- CAR – D'Onta Foreman 12-yard run (Eddy Piñeiro kick), 3:06. Panthers 28–24. **Drive: 7 plays, 60 yards, 7:27.**
- ATL – Damiere Byrd 47-yard pass from Marcus Mariota (Younghoe Koo kick), 2:14. Falcons 31–28. **Drive: 4 plays, 75 yards, 0:52.**
- ATL – Younghoe Koo 34-yard field goal, 0:36. Falcons 34–28. **Drive: 4 plays, 2 yards, 1:03.**
- CAR – D. J. Moore 62-yard pass from P. J. Walker (kick failed, wide left), 0:12. Tied 34–34. **Drive: 3 plays, 75 yards, 0:24.**

**Overtime**

- ATL – Younghoe Koo 41-yard field goal, 1:55. Falcons 37–34. **Drive: 7 plays, 62 yards, 3:44.**

**Top passers**

- CAR – P. J. Walker – 19/36, 317 yards, TD, INT
- ATL – Marcus Mariota – 20/28, 253 yards, 3 TD, 2 INT

**Top rushers**

- CAR – D'Onta Foreman – 26 rushes, 118 yards, 3 TD
- ATL – Caleb Huntley – 16 rushes, 91 yards

**Top receivers**

- CAR – D. J. Moore – 6 receptions, 152 yards, TD
- ATL – Kyle Pitts – 5 receptions, 80 yards, TD

In a close game, the Falcons defeated Carolina 37–34 in overtime. The Panthers dropped to 2–6.

==== Week 9: at Cincinnati Bengals ====
Week 9: Carolina Panthers at Cincinnati Bengals – Game summary

Quarter	1	2	3	4	Total
Panthers	0	0	7	14	**21**
**Bengals**	7	28	7	0	**42**

at Paycor Stadium, Cincinnati, Ohio

- Date: November 6
- Game time: 1:00 p.m. EST
- Game weather: Sunny, 70 °F (21 °C)
- Game attendance: 66,160
- Referee: Alex Kemp
- TV announcers (Fox): Kevin Kugler, Mark Sanchez and Laura Okmin
- Recap, Game Book

Game information

**First quarter**

- CIN – Joe Mixon 2-yard run (Evan McPherson kick), 9:42. Bengals 7–0. **Drive: 9 plays, 90 yards, 5:18.**

**Second quarter**

- CIN – Joe Burrow 1-yard run (Evan McPherson kick), 14:37. Bengals 14–0. **Drive: 10 plays, 71 yards, 5:50.**
- CIN – Joe Mixon 3-yard run (Evan McPherson kick), 7:29. Bengals 21–0. **Drive: 9 plays, 59 yards, 5:09.**
- CIN – Joe Mixon 1-yard run (Evan McPherson kick), 3:45. Bengals 28–0. **Drive: 5 plays, 42 yards, 2:51.**
- CIN – Joe Mixon 12-yard pass from Joe Burrow (Evan McPherson kick), 0:04. Bengals 35–0. **Drive: 5 plays, 23 yards, 1:05.**

**Third quarter**

- CAR – Tommy Tremble 8-yard pass from Baker Mayfield (Eddy Piñeiro kick), 10:52. Bengals 35–7. **Drive: 8 plays, 37 yards, 4:08.**
- CIN – Joe Mixon 14-yard run (Evan McPherson kick), 4:38. Bengals 42–7. **Drive: 11 plays, 75 yards, 6:14.**

**Fourth quarter**

- CAR – Terrace Marshall Jr. 21-yard pass from Baker Mayfield (Eddy Piñeiro kick), 7:47. Bengals 42–14. **Drive: 10 plays, 56 yards, 5:01.**
- CAR – Raheem Blackshear 2-yard run (Eddy Piñeiro kick), 1:29. Bengals 42–21. **Drive: 10 plays, 62 yards, 2:18.**

**Top passers**

- CAR – Baker Mayfield – 14/20, 155 yards, 2 TD
- CIN – Joe Burrow – 22/28, 206 yards, TD

**Top rushers**

- CAR – D'Onta Foreman – 7 rushes, 23 yards
- CIN – Joe Mixon – 22 rushes, 153 yards, 4 TD

**Top receivers**

- CAR – Terrace Marshall Jr. – 3 reception, 53 yards, TD
- CIN – Tee Higgins – 7 receptions, 60 yards

In the first half of this blowout, Carolina was scoreless, in part due to poor play from Walker, who posted a 0.0 passer rating, while the Cincinnati Bengals scored 5 touchdowns, four of them from Bengals running back Joe Mixon. Walker was removed from the game in favor of Mayfield, as both teams scored 7 in the third quarter. The Panthers went on to score 14 in the fourth, and even though Cincinnati went scoreless, the Bengals kept their comfortable lead and won 42–21. Carolina fell to 2–7.

==== Week 10: vs. Atlanta Falcons ====
Week 10: Atlanta Falcons at Carolina Panthers – Game summary

Quarter	1	2	3	4	Total
Falcons	0	3	6	6	**15**
**Panthers**	3	10	6	6	**25**

at Bank of America Stadium, Charlotte, North Carolina

- Date: November 10
- Game time: 8:15 p.m. EST
- Game weather: Light rain, 60 °F (16 °C)
- Game attendance: 72,029
- Referee: Adrian Hill
- TV announcers (WSOC-TV/Prime Video): Al Michaels, Kirk Herbstreit and Kaylee Hartung
- Recap, Game Book

Game information

**First quarter**

- CAR – Eddy Piñeiro 46-yard field goal, 6:59. Panthers 3–0. **Drive: 10 plays, 41 yards, 4:22.**

**Second quarter**

- CAR – Laviska Shenault 41-yard run (Eddy Piñeiro kick), 4:34. Panthers 10–0. **Drive: 2 plays, 43 yards, 0:52.**
- CAR – Eddy Piñeiro 49-yard field goal, 1:47. Panthers 13–0. **Drive: 7 plays, 14 yards, 2:24.**
- ATL – Younghoe Koo 33-yard field goal, 0:00. Panthers 13–3. **Drive: 8 plays, 60 yards, 1:47.**

**Third quarter**

- ATL – Drake London 7-yard pass from Marcus Mariota (kick failed), 6:15. Panthers 13–9. **Drive: 6 plays, 42 yards, 2:46.**
- CAR – D'Onta Foreman 12-yard run (kick failed), 1:51. Panthers 19–9. **Drive: 7 plays, 84 yards, 4:24.**

**Fourth quarter**

- CAR – Eddy Piñeiro 40-yard field goal, 9:22. Panthers 22–9. **Drive: 11 plays, 54 yards, 5:25.**
- ATL – KhaDarel Hodge 25-yard pass from Marcus Mariota (kick blocked), 2:56. Panthers 22–15. **Drive: 8 plays, 97 yards, 2:22.**
- CAR – Eddy Piñeiro 37-yard field goal, 0:10. Panthers 25–15. **Drive: 4 plays, 0 yards, 1:40.**

**Top passers**

- ATL – Marcus Mariota – 19/30, 186 yards, 2 TD, INT
- CAR – P. J. Walker – 10/16, 108 yards

**Top rushers**

- ATL – Marcus Mariota – 3 rushes, 43 yards
- CAR – D'Onta Foreman – 31 rushes, 130 yards, TD

**Top receivers**

- ATL – Damiere Byrd – 3 receptions, 58 yards
- CAR – Terrace Marshall Jr. – 1 reception, 43 yards

Carolina sought revenge against Atlanta in this Thursday Night Football game after losing in a heartbreaker 11 days prior. The Panthers got their chance, winning 25–15 and improving to 3–7.

==== Week 11: at Baltimore Ravens ====
Week 11: Carolina Panthers at Baltimore Ravens – Game summary

Quarter	1	2	3	4	Total
Panthers	0	0	3	0	**3**
**Ravens**	0	3	0	10	**13**

at M&T Bank Stadium, Baltimore, Maryland

- Date: November 20
- Game time: 1:00 p.m. EST
- Game weather: Sunny, 36 °F (2 °C)
- Game attendance: 70,677
- Referee: Jerome Boger
- TV announcers (Fox): Kevin Kugler, Mark Sanchez and Laura Okmin
- Recap, Game Book

Game information

**First quarter**

- No scoring plays.

**Second quarter**

- BAL – Justin Tucker 32-yard field goal, 0:00. Ravens 3–0. **Drive: 15 plays, 76 yards, 3:38.**

**Third quarter**

- CAR – Eddy Piñeiro 32-yard field goal, 8:07. Tied 3–3. **Drive: 9 plays, 40 yards, 3:15.**

**Fourth quarter**

- BAL – Justin Tucker 37-yard field goal, 8:27. Ravens 6–3. **Drive: 12 plays, 67 yards, 7:00.**
- BAL – Lamar Jackson 1-yard run (Justin Tucker kick), 7:16. Ravens 13–3. **Drive: 2 plays, 31 yards, 0:58.**

**Top passers**

- CAR – Baker Mayfield – 21/33, 196 yards, 2 INT
- BAL – Lamar Jackson – 24/33, 209 yards, INT

**Top rushers**

- CAR – D'Onta Foreman – 11 rushes, 24 yards
- BAL – Kenyan Drake – 10 rushes, 46 yards

**Top receivers**

- CAR – Terrace Marshall Jr. – 3 receptions, 76 yards
- BAL – Demarcus Robinson – 9 receptions, 128 yards

Baker returned from the bench in a 13–3 low scoring affair that saw Carolina fall to 3–8. This was also the last game he played for the Panthers, as Sam Darnold was healthy enough to return, and Mayfield would soon be released by the Panthers, signing with the Rams.

==== Week 12: vs. Denver Broncos ====
Week 12: Denver Broncos at Carolina Panthers – Game summary

Quarter	1	2	3	4	Total
Broncos	0	3	0	7	**10**
**Panthers**	7	3	7	6	**23**

at Bank of America Stadium, Charlotte, North Carolina

- Date: November 27
- Game time: 1:00 p.m. EST
- Game weather: Cloudy, 65 °F (18 °C)
- Game attendance: 70,644
- Referee: Clay Martin
- TV announcers (Fox): Chris Myers, Robert Smith and Jen Hale
- Recap, Game Book

Game information

**First quarter**

- CAR – D. J. Moore 5-yard pass from Sam Darnold (Eddy Piñeiro kick), 0:30. Panthers 7–0. **Drive: 11 plays, 71 yards, 7:00.**

**Second quarter**

- DEN – Brandon McManus 27-yard field goal, 10:11. Panthers 7–3. **Drive: 5 plays, 18 yards, 2:35.**
- CAR – Eddy Piñeiro 42-yard field goal, 4:42. Panthers 10–3. **Drive: 10 plays, 51 yards, 5:29.**

**Third quarter**

- CAR – Sam Darnold 2-yard run (Eddy Piñeiro kick), 7:21. Panthers 17–3. **Drive: 10 plays, 72 yards, 6:13.**

**Fourth quarter**

- CAR – Eddy Piñeiro 26-yard field goal, 13:33. Panthers 20–3. **Drive: 7 plays, 67 yards, 2:19.**
- CAR – Eddy Piñeiro 36-yard field goal, 8:59. Panthers 23–3. **Drive: 7 plays, 17 yards, 4:25.**
- DEN – Brandon Johnson 1-yard pass from Russell Wilson (Brandon McManus kick), 3:19. Panthers 23–10. **Drive: 14 plays, 77 yards, 5:40.**

**Top passers**

- DEN – Russell Wilson – 19/35, 142 yards, TD
- CAR – Sam Darnold – 11/19, 164 yards, TD

**Top rushers**

- DEN – Latavius Murray – 13 rushes, 92 yards
- CAR – D'Onta Foreman – 24 rushes, 113 yards

**Top receivers**

- DEN – Courtland Sutton – 6 receptions, 75 yards
- CAR – D. J. Moore – 4 receptions, 103 yards, TD

Darnold's first start in the season saw the Panthers beat the Broncos for the first time since the 2008 season in a 23–10 score. The Panthers improved to 4–8.

==== Week 14: at Seattle Seahawks ====
Week 14: Carolina Panthers at Seattle Seahawks – Game summary

Quarter	1	2	3	4	Total
**Panthers**	10	10	0	10	**30**
Seahawks	0	14	3	7	**24**

at Lumen Field, Seattle, Washington

- Date: December 11
- Game time: 4:25 p.m. EST/1:25 p.m. PST
- Game weather: Cloudy, 45 °F (7 °C)
- Game attendance: 68,672
- Referee: Bill Vinovich
- TV announcers (Fox): Adam Amin, Mark Schlereth and Kristina Pink
- Recap, Game Book

Game information

**First quarter**

- CAR – Eddy Piñeiro 47-yard field goal, 7:05. Panthers 3–0. **Drive: 13 plays, 43 yards, 7:55.**
- CAR – Shi Smith 13-yard pass from Sam Darnold (Eddy Piñeiro kick), 6:44. Panthers 10–0. **Drive: 1 play, 13 yards, 0:05.**

**Second quarter**

- CAR – Chuba Hubbard 2-yard run (Eddy Piñeiro kick), 12:35. Panthers 17–0. **Drive: 12 plays, 74 yards, 6:52.**
- SEA – Tyler Lockett 4-yard pass from Geno Smith (Jason Myers kick), 9:26. Panthers 17–7. **Drive: 7 plays, 67 yards, 3:09.**
- CAR – Eddy Piñeiro 32-yard field goal, 2:09. Panthers 20–7. **Drive: 8 plays, 25 yards, 4:09.**
- SEA – DK Metcalf 12-yard pass from Geno Smith (Jason Myers kick), 0:16. Panthers 20–14. **Drive: 9 plays, 46 yards, 1:53.**

**Third quarter**

- SEA – Jason Myers 27-yard field goal, 10:00. Panthers 20–17. **Drive: 9 plays, 51 yards, 5:00.**

**Fourth quarter**

- CAR – Raheem Blackshear 8-yard run (Eddy Piñeiro kick), 6:57. Panthers 27–17. **Drive: 10 plays, 74 yards, 5:26.**
- CAR – Eddy Piñeiro 39-yard field goal, 1:56. Panthers 30–17. **Drive: 9 plays, 44 yards, 4:21.**
- SEA – Marquise Goodwin 24-yard pass from Geno Smith (Jason Myers kick), 0:16. Panthers 30–24. **Drive: 6 plays, 75 yards, 1:40.**

**Top passers**

- CAR – Sam Darnold – 14/24, 120 yards, TD
- SEA – Geno Smith – 19/35, 142 yards, TD

**Top rushers**

- CAR – D'Onta Foreman – 21 rushes, 74 yards
- SEA – Travis Homer – 9 rushes, 26 yards

**Top receivers**

- CAR – Laviska Shenault – 4 receptions, 31 yards
- SEA – Marquise Goodwin – 5 receptions, 95 yards, TD

Carolina defeated Seattle for the first time since 2015, winning 30–24. The Panthers improved to 5–8, and with a Buccaneers loss, also allowed them control of their own destiny, meaning they were guaranteed a spot in the playoffs if they could win out.

==== Week 15: vs. Pittsburgh Steelers ====
Week 15: Pittsburgh Steelers at Carolina Panthers – Game summary

Quarter	1	2	3	4	Total
**Steelers**	7	7	7	3	**24**
Panthers	0	7	0	9	**16**

at Bank of America Stadium, Charlotte, North Carolina

- Date: December 18
- Game time: 1:00 p.m. EST
- Game weather: Sunny, 46 °F (8 °C)
- Game attendance: 73,548
- Referee: Scott Novak
- TV announcers (CBS): Greg Gumbel, Adam Archuleta and AJ Ross
- Recap, Game Book

Game information

**First quarter**

- PIT – Najee Harris 7-yard run (Chris Boswell kick), 5:48. Steelers 7–0. **Drive: 12 plays, 67 yards, 7:06.**

**Second quarter**

- CAR – D. J. Moore 5-yard pass from Sam Darnold (Eddy Piñeiro kick), 14:12. Tied 7–7. **Drive: 11 plays, 85 yards, 6:36.**
- PIT – Jaylen Warren 2-yard run (Chris Boswell kick), 8:20. Steelers 14–7. **Drive: 10 plays, 75 yards, 5:52.**

**Third quarter**

- PIT – Mitchell Trubisky 1-yard run (Chris Boswell kick), 3:17. Steelers 21–7. **Drive: 21 plays, 91 yards, 11:43.**

**Fourth quarter**

- CAR – Eddy Piñeiro 29-yard field goal, 11:52. Steelers 21–10. **Drive: 11 plays, 64 yards, 6:25.**
- CAR – Eddy Piñeiro 32-yard field goal, 6:15. Steelers 21–13. **Drive: 7 plays, 59 yards, 4:06.**
- PIT – Chris Boswell 50-yard field goal, 1:04. Steelers 24–13. **Drive: 13 plays, 43 yards, 5:11.**
- CAR – Eddy Piñeiro 52-yard field goal, 0:19. Steelers 24–16. **Drive: 5 plays, 29 yards, 0:45.**

**Top passers**

- PIT – Mitchell Trubisky – 17/22, 179 yards
- CAR – Sam Darnold – 14/23, 225 yards, TD

**Top rushers**

- PIT – Najee Harris – 24 rushes, 86 yards, TD
- CAR – Chuba Hubbard – 4 rushes, 10 yards

**Top receivers**

- PIT – Diontae Johnson – 10 receptions, 98 yards
- CAR – D. J. Moore – 5 receptions, 73 yards, TD

Mitchell Trubisky and the Pittsburgh Steelers were too much for Carolina, defeating them 24–16. The Panthers fell to 5–9, yet still maintained control of their destiny.

==== Week 16: vs. Detroit Lions ====
Week 16: Detroit Lions at Carolina Panthers – Game summary

Quarter	1	2	3	4	Total
Lions	7	0	6	10	**23**
**Panthers**	7	17	7	6	**37**

at Bank of America Stadium, Charlotte, North Carolina

- Date: December 24
- Game time: 1:00 p.m. EST
- Game weather: Sunny, 20 °F (−7 °C)
- Game attendance: 69,173
- Referee: Shawn Hochuli
- TV announcers (Fox): Chris Myers, Robert Smith and Jen Hale
- Recap, Game Book

Game information

**First quarter**

- CAR – Raheem Blackshear 7-yard run (Eddy Piñeiro kick), 11:57. Panthers 7–0. **Drive: 5 plays, 78 yards, 3:03.**
- DET – Shane Zylstra 3-yard pass from Jared Goff (Michael Badgley kick), 8:38. Tied 7–7. **Drive: 8 plays, 60 yards, 3:19.**

**Second quarter**

- CAR – Sam Darnold 3-yard run (Eddy Piñeiro kick), 9:35. Panthers 14–7. **Drive: 8 plays, 91 yards, 4:42.**
- CAR – D'Onta Foreman 4-yard run (Eddy Piñeiro kick), 2:08. Panthers 21–7. **Drive: 11 plays, 92 yards, 6:26.**
- CAR – Eddy Piñeiro 37-yard field goal, 0:00. Panthers 24–7. **Drive: 7 plays, 68 yards, 0:59.**

**Third quarter**

- CAR – D. J. Moore 5-yard pass from Sam Darnold (Eddy Piñeiro kick), 9:12. Panthers 31–7. **Drive: 7 plays, 74 yards, 3:34.**
- DET – Shane Zylstra 7-yard pass from Jared Goff (Run failed), 3:09. Panthers 31–13. **Drive: 7 plays, 80 yards, 3:12.**

**Fourth quarter**

- CAR – Eddy Piñeiro 40-yard field goal, 13:13. Panthers 34–13. **Drive: 10 plays, 47 yards, 4:56.**
- DET – Shane Zylstra 1-yard pass from Jared Goff (Michael Badgley kick), 3:46. Panthers 34–20. **Drive: 8 plays, 87 yards, 1:50.**
- CAR – Eddy Piñeiro 36-yard field goal, 1:56. Panthers 37–20. **Drive: 6 plays, 32 yards, 1:50.**
- DET – Michael Badgley 34-yard field goal, 0:36. Panthers 37–23. **Drive: 8 plays, 62 yards, 1:20.**

**Top passers**

- DET – Jared Goff – 25/42, 355 yards, 3 TD
- CAR – Sam Darnold – 15/22, 250 yards, TD

**Top rushers**

- DET – Jared Goff – 3 rushes, 15 yards
- CAR – D'Onta Foreman – 21 rushes, 165 yards, TD

**Top receivers**

- DET – D. J. Chark – 4 receptions, 108 yards
- CAR – D. J. Moore – 5 receptions, 83 yards, TD

On Christmas Eve, the Panthers ran all over the Detroit Lions, beating them 37–23, as well as setting new franchise records in rushing yards in a game and total yards in a game. Carolina improved to 6–9, improving on their five-win totals from the previous three seasons.

==== Week 17: at Tampa Bay Buccaneers ====
Week 17: Carolina Panthers at Tampa Bay Buccaneers – Game summary

Quarter	1	2	3	4	Total
Panthers	7	7	0	10	**24**
**Buccaneers**	0	10	0	20	**30**

at Raymond James Stadium, Tampa, Florida

- Date: January 1
- Game time: 1:00 p.m. EST
- Game weather: Cloudy, 73 °F (23 °C)
- Game attendance: 69,298
- Referee: Brad Rogers
- TV announcers (Fox): Kevin Burkhardt, Greg Olsen and Erin Andrews
- Recap, Game Book

Game information

**First quarter**

- CAR – Tommy Tremble 17-yard pass from Sam Darnold (Eddy Piñeiro kick), 11:39. Panthers 7–0. **Drive: 6 plays, 75 yards, 3:21.**

**Second quarter**

- CAR – D. J. Moore 24-yard pass from Sam Darnold (Eddy Piñeiro kick), 7:51. Panthers 14–0. **Drive: 8 plays, 57 yards, 4:09.**
- TB – Mike Evans 63-yard pass from Tom Brady (Ryan Succop kick), 2:10. Panthers 14–7. **Drive: 4 plays, 80 yards, 0:52.**
- TB – Ryan Succop 22-yard field goal, 1:09. Panthers 14–10. **Drive: 4 plays, 9 yards, 0:48.**

**Third quarter**

- No scoring plays.

**Fourth quarter**

- CAR – Shi Smith 19-yard pass from Sam Darnold (Eddy Piñeiro kick), 14:50. Panthers 21–10. **Drive: 7 plays, 91 yards, 3:47.**
- TB – Mike Evans 57-yard pass from Tom Brady (pass failed), 13:49. Panthers 21–16. **Drive: 3 plays, 75 yards, 1:01.**
- TB – Mike Evans 30-yard pass from Tom Brady (Tom Brady-Chris Godwin pass), 6:47. Buccaneers 24–21. **Drive: 8 plays, 92 yards, 3:06.**
- TB – Tom Brady 1-yard run (kick failed), 1:58. Buccaneers 30–21. **Drive: 2 plays, 6 yards, 0:26.**
- CAR – Eddy Piñeiro 49-yard field goal, 0:59. Buccaneers 30–24. **Drive: 8 plays, 44 yards, 0:59.**

**Top passers**

- CAR – Sam Darnold – 23/37, 341 yards, 3 TD, INT
- TB – Tom Brady – 34/45, 432 yards, 3 TD

**Top rushers**

- CAR – D'Onta Foreman – 13 rushes, 35 yards
- TB – Leonard Fournette – 10 rushes, 28 yards

**Top receivers**

- CAR – D. J. Moore – 6 receptions, 117 yards, TD
- TB – Mike Evans – 10 receptions, 207 yards, 3 TD

In a must win game, the Panthers visited the Buccaneers, and held a 14–0 lead at one point, but the Buccaneers were able to recover and win 30–24. Carolina fell to 6–10 and were officially eliminated from playoff contention.

==== Week 18: at New Orleans Saints ====
Week 18: Carolina Panthers at New Orleans Saints – Game summary

Quarter	1	2	3	4	Total
**Panthers**	0	7	0	3	**10**
Saints	7	0	0	0	**7**

at Caesars Superdome, New Orleans, Louisiana

- Date: January 8
- Game time: 1:00 p.m. EST/12:00 p.m. CST
- Game weather: None (indoor stadium)
- Game attendance: 70,118
- Referee: Alex Kemp
- TV announcers (Fox): Jason Benetti, Matt Millen and Megan Olivi
- Recap, Game Book

Game information

**First quarter**

- NO – Chris Olave 25-yard pass from Andy Dalton (Wil Lutz kick), 11:01. Saints 7–0. **Drive: 8 plays, 75 yards, 3:59.**

**Second quarter**

- No scoring plays.

**Third quarter**

- CAR – Michael Jordan fumble recovery in end zone (Eddy Piñeiro kick), 6:45. Tied 7–7. **Drive: 14 plays, 82 yards, 8:15.**

**Fourth quarter**

- CAR – Eddy Piñeiro 42-yard field goal, 0:00. Panthers 10–7. **Drive: 6 plays, 31 yards, 1:20.**

**Top passers**

- CAR – Sam Darnold – 5/15, 43 yards, 2 INT
- NO – Andy Dalton – 15/25, 171 yards, TD

**Top rushers**

- CAR – Chuba Hubbard – 21 rushes, 69 yards
- NO – Alvin Kamara – 23 rushes, 107 yards

**Top receivers**

- CAR – Terrace Marshall Jr. – 2 receptions, 23 yards
- NO – Chris Olave – 5 receptions, 60 yards, TD

The Panthers are able to hold the Saints to a touchdown and win 10–7. They finished the season 7–10, capping off the first season since 2018 the Panthers won more than five games.

=== Standings ===
==== Division ====
NFC South
	W	L	T	PCT	DIV	CONF	PF	PA	STK
^{(4)} Tampa Bay Buccaneers	8	9	0	.471	4–2	8–4	313	358	L1
Carolina Panthers	7	10	0	.412	4–2	6–6	347	374	W1
New Orleans Saints	7	10	0	.412	2–4	5–7	330	345	L1
Atlanta Falcons	7	10	0	.412	2–4	6–6	365	386	W2

==== Conference ====
NFC
#	Team	Division	W	L	T	PCT	DIV	CONF	SOS	SOV	STK
**Division leaders**
1	Philadelphia Eagles	East	14	3	0	.824	4–2	9–3	.474	.460	W1
2 (Note: San Francisco claimed the No. 2 seed over Minnesota based on conference record (10–2 vs. 8–4).)	San Francisco 49ers	West	13	4	0	.765	6–0	10–2	.417	.414	W10
3	Minnesota Vikings	North	13	4	0	.765	4–2	8–4	.474	.425	W1
4	Tampa Bay Buccaneers	South	8	9	0	.471	4–2	8–4	.503	.426	L1
**Wild cards**
5	Dallas Cowboys	East	12	5	0	.706	4–2	8–4	.507	.485	L1
6	New York Giants	East	9	7	1	.559	1–4–1	4–7–1	.526	.395	L1
7 (Note: Seattle finished ahead of Detroit based on head-to-head victory, claiming the 7th and final playoff spot.)	Seattle Seahawks	West	9	8	0	.529	4–2	6–6	.462	.382	W2
**Did not qualify for the postseason**
8	Detroit Lions	North	9	8	0	.529	5–1	7–5	.535	.451	W2
9	Washington Commanders	East	8	8	1	.500	2–3–1	5–6–1	.536	.449	W1
10	Green Bay Packers	North	8	9	0	.471	3–3	6–6	.524	.449	L1
11 (Note: Carolina finished ahead of New Orleans and Atlanta based on head-to-head record (3–1 vs. 2–2/1–3).)	Carolina Panthers	South	7	10	0	.412	4–2	6–6	.474	.437	W1
12 (Note: New Orleans finished ahead of Atlanta based on head-to-head sweep.)	New Orleans Saints	South	7	10	0	.412	2–4	5–7	.507	.462	L1
13	Atlanta Falcons	South	7	10	0	.412	2–4	6–6	.467	.429	W2
14	Los Angeles Rams	West	5	12	0	.294	1–5	3–9	.517	.341	L2
15	Arizona Cardinals	West	4	13	0	.235	1–5	3–9	.529	.368	L7
16	Chicago Bears	North	3	14	0	.176	0–6	1–11	.571	.480	L10
**Tiebreakers** (Note: When breaking ties for three or more teams under the NFL's rules, they are first broken within divisions, then comparing only the highest-ranked remaining team from each division.)
