= Edwin Yoder =

American journalist (1934–2023)

Edwin Milton Yoder Jr. (July 18, 1934 – November 30, 2023) was an American journalist and Pulitzer Prize winner.

== Life and career ==
Edwin Milton Yoder Jr. was born on July 18, 1934. He was educated at the University of North Carolina at Chapel Hill, graduating in English in 1956. Yoder then won a Rhodes Scholarship to Jesus College, Oxford, and studied Philosophy, Politics and Economics from 1956 to 1958. While at Oxford, Yoder was a member of the Oxford University basketball team with teammates Willie Morris and Paul Sarbanes. He was then an editorial writer for various newspapers including the Charlotte News, the Greensboro Daily News and the Washington Star. During his time at the Washington Star, he won the Pulitzer Prize for Editorial Writing in 1979. He was a columnist on The Washington Post from 1982. In 1992, he was appointed Professor of Humanities at Washington and Lee University. He was elected to an Honorary Fellowship of Jesus College, Oxford, in 1998. He died in Chapel Hill, North Carolina, on November 30, 2023, at the age of 89.

== Publications ==
- The Night of the Old South Ball, and Other Essays and Fables, Oxford, 1984.
- The Unmaking of a Whig and Other Essays in Self-Definition, Georgetown University Press, 1990.
- Joe Alsop's Cold War: A Study of Journalistic Influence and Intrigue, U. of NC Press, 1995.
- The Historical Present: Uses and Abuses of the Past, UP of Mississippi, 1997.
- "Blackmail"—winner of Andrew Lytle 2002 Prize in Fiction in the Sewanee Review, fall 2002.
- Telling Others What To Think: Recollections of a Pundit, LSU Press, 2004.
- Lions at Lamb House, Europa Editions, 2007.
