= Oxford University Women's Basketball =

Oxford University Basketball Club
- Nickname: The Blues
- Conference: B.U.C.S. Midlands
- Founded: 1921
- Arena: Iffley Road Sports Centre
- Capacity: 500
- Location: Oxford, England
- Team colors: Oxford Blue and White
- Head coach: Graham Nichols
- B.U.S.A. / B.U.C.S. National Championship titles: 1994, 1998, 1999
- B.U.C.S. Midlands Division One titles: 2006, 2008
- Website: www.oubbc.weebly.com
Home	Road

The Oxford University Women's Basketball team is the college basketball team at University of Oxford in England. The Blues won their first B.U.S.A. national championship in 1994 and then back to back B.U.S.A. National Championships in 1998 and 1999.

== Notable alumni ==
Jodi Evans - Canadian Women's National Team Basketball Player

Robyn Hadley - First African American woman from the Southern United States to be named a Rhodes Scholar

Susan Rice - Director of the United States Domestic Policy Council

Monde Muyangwa - Africa Program Director at the Woodrow Wilson International Center for Scholars
