= The Varsity Game =

Annual Basketball Competition

- Contested by
Oxford University	Cambridge University
First Varsity Game	1921
Current champion	Oxford University
Biggest Victory	Oxford University, 2010 (117-64)
Trophy	The Varsity Cup
- Number of wins (since 1949)
Oxford University	Cambridge University
55	21
- Official website
- thevarsitygame.org

The Varsity Game is an annual basketball fixture played between the University of Oxford and the University of Cambridge which dates back to 1921. The first post-war Varsity Game was played on 11 June 1949 at RAF Halton and resulted in a 47-11 Oxford win. It has remained an annual event ever since.

In the 1950s, The Varsity Game between Oxford and Cambridge was one of the highlights of the British basketball calendar. The game was of national interest and was held at the Empire Pool and Indoor Arena, Wembley. Uncommon for basketball in the United Kingdom, the Oxford-Cambridge rivalry basketball game received coverage from the national press.

The Varsity Game holds a special reverence for the basketball teams at Oxford and Cambridge. Traditionally, it is the final game of the season for both teams and is the highlight of the basketball season. In the 14 March 1966 edition of Sports Illustrated, NBA Hall-of-famer Bill Bradley said in reference to The Varsity Game: "'This game,' remarked Bradley, who flew back from playing with the Italian Simmenthal team in Milan the morning of the event, 'is the only one I care about.'"

== The Varsity Game Results ==
No.	Date	Venue	Winner	Score	Margin of victory	Oxford total wins	Cambridge total wins
1	25 March 1921†; 1922–1949 no known games	Muswell Hill					
2	11 June 1949	RAF Halton	Oxford	47-11	36	1	0
3	11 March 1950	Culham College Gymnasium	Oxford	37-22	15	2	0
4	10 March 1951	London	Oxford	31-23	8	3	0
5	21 May 1952	USAF Gymnasium, Upper Heyford	Oxford	65-40	2	4	0
6	7 March 1953	Cambridge Corn Exchange	Oxford	42-20	22	5	0
7	11 June 1954	RAF Upper Heyford	Oxford	39-30	9	6	0
8	6 March 1955	USAF Arena RAF Upper Heyford	Oxford	73-41	32	7	0
9	11 June 1956	RAF Lakenheath / USAF Mildenhall	Cambridge	56-59	3	7	1
10	7 March 1957	Cowley Barracks	Oxford	5-43	8	8	1
11	1958		Oxford			9	1
12	1959		Cambridge	34-36	2	9	
13	1960		Cambridge	52-65	13	9	3
14	1961	High school gym near Cambridge	Cambridge	42-44	2	9	4
15	1962		Cambridge	38-68	30	9	5
16	1963		Cambridge	39-45	6	9	6
17	29 February 1964	RAF Lakenheath	Oxford	72-49	23	10	6
18	1965		Oxford	75-58	17	11	6
19	5 March 1966	Lakenheath American High School	Oxford	76-64	8	12	6
20	4 March 1967	Iffley Road Sports Centre	Oxford	71-59	12	13	6
21	9 March 1968	RAF Lakenheath	Oxford	78-56	22	14	6
22	1 March 1969	Iffley Road Sports Centre	Oxford	67-26	41	15	6
23	29 February 1970	USAF Lakenheath	Oxford	79-40	39	16	6
24	27 February 1971	Iffley Road Sports Centre	Oxford	88-40	48	17	6
25	1972		Oxford	101-60	41	18	6
26	3 March 1973	Crystal Palace National Sports Centre	Oxford	84-68	16	19	6
27	16 March 1974	Crystal Palace National Sports Centre	Oxford	87-48	39	20	6
28	8 March 1975	Crystal Palace National Sports Centre	Oxford	87-67	20	21	6
29	6 March 1976	Crystal Palace National Sports Centre	Oxford	92-59	33	22	6
30	5 March 1977	Crystal Palace National Sports Centre	Oxford	104-64	40	23	6
31	4 March 1978	Crystal Palace National Sports Centre	Oxford	102-65	37	24	6
32	8 March 1979	Crystal Palace National Sports Centre	Oxford	83-78	5	25	6
33	7 March 1980	Crystal Palace National Sports Centre	Oxford	103-94	9	26	6
34	1 March 1981	Crystal Palace National Sports Centre	Oxford			27	6
35	7 March 1982	Crystal Palace National Sports Centre	Oxford	79-76	3	28	6
36	1983		Oxford			29	6
37	February 1984	Iffley Road Sports Centre	Oxford	94-72	22	30	6
38	9 March 1985		Cambridge	62-63	1	30	7
39	1 March 1986	Iffley Road Sports Centre	Oxford	90-76	14	31	7
40	1987		Cambridge	67-94	27	31	8
41	27 February 1988	Iffley Road Sports Centre	Oxford	104-87	17	32	8
42	5 March 1989	Kelsey Kerridge Sports Hall	Oxford	83-78	5	33	8
43	4 March 1990		Oxford	87-57	30	34	8
44	1991		Oxford	59-54	5	35	8
45	1 March 1992		Oxford	75-46	29	36	8
46	14 February 1993	Kelsey Kerridge Hall, Cambridge	Cambridge	64-86	22	36	9
47	19 February 1994		Oxford	91-84	7	37	9
48	18 February 1995		Cambridge	58-64	6	37	10
49	17 February 1996	Iffley Road Sports Centre, Oxford	Cambridge	97-108	11	37	11
50	1997		Oxford	65-63	2	38	11
51	21 February 1998	Iffley Road Sports Centre, Oxford	Oxford	88-54	33	39	11
52	21 February 1999		Oxford	98-59	39	40	11
53	19 February 2000		Oxford	118-71	47	41	11
54	2001		Oxford	118-86	32	42	11
55	24 February 2002		Oxford	115-90	25	43	11
56	14 February 2003		Oxford	96-77	19	44	11
57	29 February 2004	Iffley Road Sports Centre, Oxford	Cambridge	69-79	10	44	12
58	12 February 2005	Kelsey Kerridge Sports Centre, Cambridge	Cambridge	50-59	9	44	13
59	19 February 2006	Iffley Road Sports Centre, Oxford	Oxford	75-71	4	45	13
60	18 February 2007	Kelsey Kerridge Sports Centre, Cambridge	Oxford	68-65	3	46	13
61	24 February 2008	Iffley Road Sports Centre, Oxford	Oxford	73-61	12	47	13
62	21 February 2009	Kelsey Kerridge Sports Centre, Cambridge	Oxford	93-59	34	48	13
63	21 February 2010	Iffley Road Sports Centre, Oxford	Oxford	117-64	53	49	13
64	26 February 2011	Kelsey Kerridge Sports Centre, Cambridge	Oxford	96-63	33	50	13
65	4 March 2012	Iffley Road Sports Centre, Oxford	Oxford	91-66	25	51	13
66	23 February 2013	Kelsey Kerridge Sports Centre, Cambridge	Cambridge	68-93	25	51	14
67	1 March 2014	Iffley Road Sports Centre, Oxford	Oxford	67-59	8	52	14
68	28 February 2015	University of Cambridge Sports Centre, Cambridge	Cambridge	66-91	25	52	15
69	27 February 2016	Oxford Brookes Centre for Sport, Oxford	Oxford	66-54	12	53	15
70	26 February 2017	University of Cambridge Sports Centre, Cambridge	Cambridge	69-81	12	53	16
71	24 February 2018	Iffley Road Sports Centre, Oxford	Oxford	65-59	6	54	16
72	23 February 2019	University of Cambridge Sports, Cambridge Centre	Cambridge	69-81	12	54	17
73	15 February 2020	Iffley Road Sports Centre, Oxford	Cambridge	65-71	6	54	18
74	19 June 2021	Iffley Road Sports Centre, Oxford	Cambridge	72-74	2	54	19
75	6 March 2022	University of Cambridge Sports Centre, Cambridge	Cambridge	67-72	5	54	20
76	11 March 2023	Iffley Road Sports Centre, Oxford	Oxford	84-74	10	55	20
77	2 March 2024	University of Cambridge Sports Centre, Cambridge	Cambridge	67-88	21	55	21
78	1 March 2025	Iffley Road Sports Centre, Oxford	Oxford	87-69	18	56	21
79	7 March 2026	University of Cambridge Sports Centre, Cambridge	Cambridge	55-71	16	56	22

† – Score and result of the first Varsity Game is unknown.

== See also ==
- BUCS Basketball League
- List of British and Irish varsity matches
- Oxford–Cambridge rivalry
