= Steve Wilks =

American football coach (born 1969)

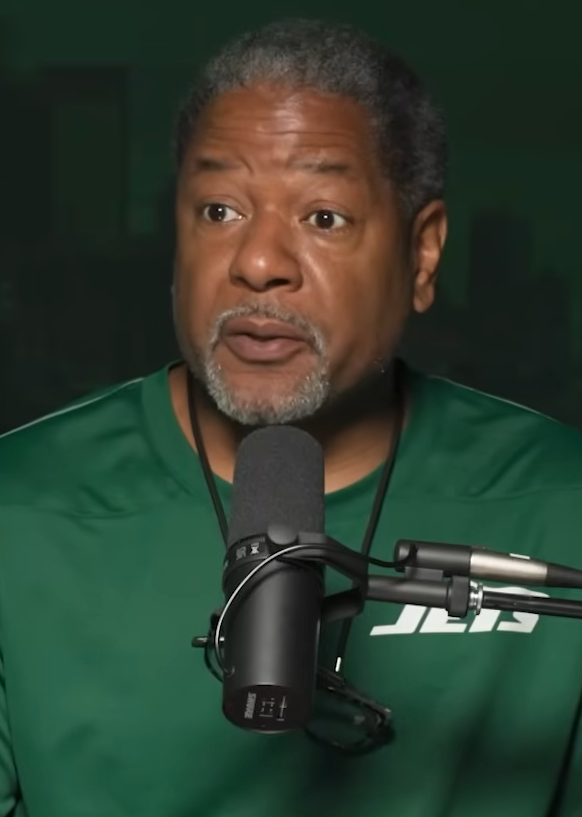
- Wilks with the New York Jets in 2025

Washington Commanders
- Title: Defensive advisor

Personal information
- Born: August 8, 1969 (age 57); Charlotte, North Carolina, U.S.

Career information
- Position: Defensive back
- High school: West Charlotte
- College: Appalachian State (1987–1991)

Career history

Playing
- Charlotte Rage (1993)

Coaching
- Johnson C. Smith (1995–1996) Defensive coordinator; Savannah State (1997–1999); Defensive coordinator (1997–1998); Head coach (1999); Illinois State (2000) Defensive backs coach; Appalachian State (2001) Defensive backs coach; East Tennessee State (2002) Defensive coordinator; Bowling Green (2003) Defensive backs coach; Notre Dame (2004) Defensive backs coach; Washington (2005) Secondary coach; Chicago Bears (2006–2008) Defensive backs coach; San Diego Chargers (2009–2011) Defensive backs coach; Carolina Panthers (2012–2017); Defensive backs coach (2012–2014); Assistant head coach & defensive backs coach (2015–2016); Assistant head coach & defensive coordinator (2017); Arizona Cardinals (2018) Head coach; Cleveland Browns (2019) Defensive coordinator; Missouri (2021) Defensive coordinator; Carolina Panthers (2022); Defensive passing game coordinator & secondary coach; Interim head coach; San Francisco 49ers (2023) Defensive coordinator; Charlotte (2024) Volunteer advisor; New York Jets (2025) Defensive coordinator; Washington Commanders (2026–present) Defensive advisor

Operations
- Appalachian State (2026–present) Special Assistant to Athletics

Head coaching record
- Regular season: NCAA: 5–6 (.455); NFL: 9–19 (.321)
- Coaching profile at Pro Football Reference

Steven Bernard Wilks (born August 8, 1969) is an American professional football defensive advisor to the Washington Commanders. A defensive assistant for most of his career, he was the assistant head coach and defensive backs coach for the Carolina Panthers when they reached Super Bowl 50 and the defensive coordinator for the San Francisco 49ers when they reached Super Bowl LVIII. Wilks was also the head coach of the Arizona Cardinals in 2018 and the interim head coach of the Panthers in 2022.

== Early life and playing career ==
Wilks was born in Charlotte and attended West Charlotte High School. He played defensive back from 1987 to 1991 at Appalachian State.

Wilks played one year (1993) in the Arena Football League for the Charlotte Rage as a wide receiver, defensive back, and kick returner.

== Coaching career ==
=== College ===
Wilks served as the head coach at Savannah State College for one season (1999) and compiled a record of 5–6. He coached college-level football until 2005.

=== Chicago Bears ===
On February 16, 2006, Wilks was hired by the Chicago Bears as defensive backs coach. On December 30, 2008, the Bears announced that they had fired Wilks.

=== San Diego Chargers ===
Wilks was hired as defensive backs coach of the San Diego Chargers in 2009. He worked under former Bears defensive coordinator and then-Chargers defensive coordinator Ron Rivera, with Rivera promoted from defensive backs coach.

=== Carolina Panthers (first stint) ===
When Rivera became head coach of the Panthers, he hired Wilks as secondary coach on January 15, 2012. He was promoted to assistant head coach in 2015. He was Pro Football Focus' second runner up to their Secondary Coach of the Year award.

In the 2015 season, Wilks and the Panthers finished 15–1 and reached Super Bowl 50 on February 7, 2016. The Panthers fell to the Denver Broncos by a score of 24–10.

After defensive coordinator Sean McDermott left to become head coach of the Buffalo Bills, Wilks was promoted to McDermott's former position.

After the 2017 season, Wilks was an extremely hot commodity for teams in need of new head coaches. According to Ian Rapoport of the NFL Network, teams were impressed by Wilks' interview with the Los Angeles Rams in the previous offseason before they eventually hired Sean McVay. Wilks also interviewed with the New York Giants, who had hired David Gettleman as general manager. Gettleman previously served as general manager for the Panthers.

=== Arizona Cardinals ===
On January 22, 2018, Wilks was hired as head coach of the Arizona Cardinals, replacing Bruce Arians. In the 2018 season opener against the Washington Redskins, Wilks made his head coaching debut with a 24–6 loss. In Week 5, against the San Francisco 49ers, he recorded his first NFL victory as a head coach. He finished coaching the season with a league-worst 3–13 record, the worst record for the Cardinals since 2000. On December 31, 2018, the Cardinals fired Wilks.

=== Cleveland Browns ===
On January 14, 2019, Wilks was hired by the Cleveland Browns to be their defensive coordinator under head coach Freddie Kitchens. He was not retained for the 2020 season under new head coach Kevin Stefanski.

=== Missouri ===
On January 21, 2021, after 13 seasons with the NFL, Wilks returned to college football. He was hired by the University of Missouri as their defensive coordinator under head coach Eliah Drinkwitz.

=== Carolina Panthers (second stint) ===
On February 9, 2022, Wilks returned to the NFL and to the Carolina Panthers, who announced the hiring of Wilks as Matt Rhule's new defensive pass game coordinator and secondary coach. On October 10, 2022, after Rhule was fired, Wilks was named the Panthers' interim head coach for the remainder of the season. Wilks led Carolina to a 6–6 record over the season's remaining 12 weeks, but was passed over for the permanent head coaching position in favor of Frank Reich.

=== San Francisco 49ers ===
On February 9, 2023, the San Francisco 49ers hired Wilks as their defensive coordinator. On February 14, 2024, he was fired following their loss in Super Bowl LVIII, following a season of inconsistency on defense.

=== Charlotte ===
In August 2024, Wilks became a volunteer advisor for the Charlotte 49ers football program.

=== New York Jets ===
On February 1, 2025, the New York Jets named Wilks as their defensive coordinator under head coach Aaron Glenn. On December 15, Wilks was fired by Glenn following a 48–20 loss to the Jacksonville Jaguars.

=== Washington Commanders ===
Following a record of 1-4-1 to start the 2026 season, the Washington Commanders hired Wilks as a defensive advisor on a part-time basis and with a focus on game planning.

== Executive career ==
=== Appalachian State ===
On May 4, 2026, Wilks returned to his alma mater, Appalachian State, as a special assistant in the school's athletic department.

== Head coaching record ==
=== College ===
Year	Team	Overall	Conference	Standing	Bowl/playoffs
Savannah State Tigers (Southern Intercollegiate Athletic Conference) (1999)
1999	Savannah State	5–6	3–4		
Savannah State:		5–6	3–4		
Total:		5–6			

=== NFL ===
Team	Year	Regular season					Postseason			
Team	Year	Won	Lost	Ties	Win %	Finish	Won	Lost	Win %	Result
ARI	2018	3	13	0	.188	4th in NFC West	–	–	–	–
ARI total		3	13	0	.188	–	–	–	–	–
CAR*	2022	6	6	0	.500	2nd in NFC South	–	–	–	–
CAR total		6	6	0	.500	–	–	–	–	–
Total		9	19	0	.321		0	0	.000	

* – Interim head coach

== Personal life ==
Wilks is a Christian. He is married to Marcia Wilks. They have two daughters and one son.
