= BUCS Basketball League =

The BUCS Basketball League system is where the British Universities and Colleges Sport (BUCS) basketball teams of the universities and colleges in the United Kingdom compete.

== League Structure ==
The BUCS Basketball League system consists of two regional Premier Leagues, North and South. Below this are five regional conferences, Northern, Midlands, Western, South Eastern, and Scottish. Each of these regional conferences consist of a number of divisions that are ranked on a tier system. Tier 1 has a single division covering the entire region, while Tier 2 and below are sub-divided (except in Scotland) into A and B divisions on a geographical basis. A team may be promoted or demoted to a higher or lower division respectively, subject to results within their division at the end of the season and the results of playoffs.

The whole League format is summarised below:

Men's BUSA Basketball League System:
Level
Premier Leagues	North				South				
Tier 1	Scottish 1A	Northern 1A		Midlands 1A		Western 1A		South Eastern 1A	
Tier 2	Scottish 2A	Northern 2A	Northern 2B	Midlands 2A	Midlands 2B	Western 2A	Western 2B	South Eastern 2A	South Eastern 2B
Tier 3	Scottish 3A	Northern 3A	Northern 3B	Midlands 3A	Midlands 3B	Western 3A		South Eastern 3A	South Eastern 3B
Tier 4	Scottish 4A	Northern 4A	Northern 4B	Midlands 4A	Midlands 4B			South Eastern 4A	South Eastern 4B
Tier 5		Northern 5A	Northern 5B					South Eastern 5A	

Women's BUSA Basketball League System:
Level
Premier Leagues	North				South				
Tier 1	Scottish 1A	Northern 1A		Midlands 1A		Western 1A		South Eastern 1A	
Tier 2	Scottish 2A	Northern 2A	Northern 2B	Midlands 2A	Midlands 2B	Western 2A	Western 2B	South Eastern 2A	South Eastern 2B
Tier 3		Northern 3A	Northern 3B	Midlands 3A	Midlands 3B			South Eastern 3A	South Eastern 3B

All teams also participate in one of three knockout cups, depending on league position (Premier – Championship Tier 1 – Trophy; lower tiers – Conference Cup).

== Past results ==
Year		Championship	Premier North	Premier South
2015–16	Men	Loughborough	Northumbria	East London
2015–16	Women	Sheffield Hallam	Northumbria	Cardiff Met
2014–15	Men	Northumbria	Northumbria	Cardiff Met
2014–15	Women	Loughborough	Durham	Cardiff Met
2013–14	Men	Worcester	Durham	London South Bank
2013–14	Women	Northumbria	Northumbria	Cardiff Met
2012–13	Men	Worcester	Durham	London South Bank
2012–13	Women	Loughborough	Loughborough	Cardiff Met
2011–12	Men	Worcester	Worcester	London South Bank
2011–12	Women	Durham	Durham	Cardiff Met

== See also ==
- The Varsity Game
