= 2025 Carolina Panthers season =

31st season in franchise history, first playoff berth since 2017

- Owner: David Tepper
- General manager: Dan Morgan
- Head coach: Dave Canales
- Offensive coordinator: Brad Idzik
- Defensive coordinator: Ejiro Evero
- Home stadium: Bank of America Stadium

Results
- Record: 8–9
- Division place: 1st NFC South
- Playoffs: Lost Wild Card Playoffs (vs. Rams) 31–34
- Pro Bowlers: CB Jaycee Horn

Uniform
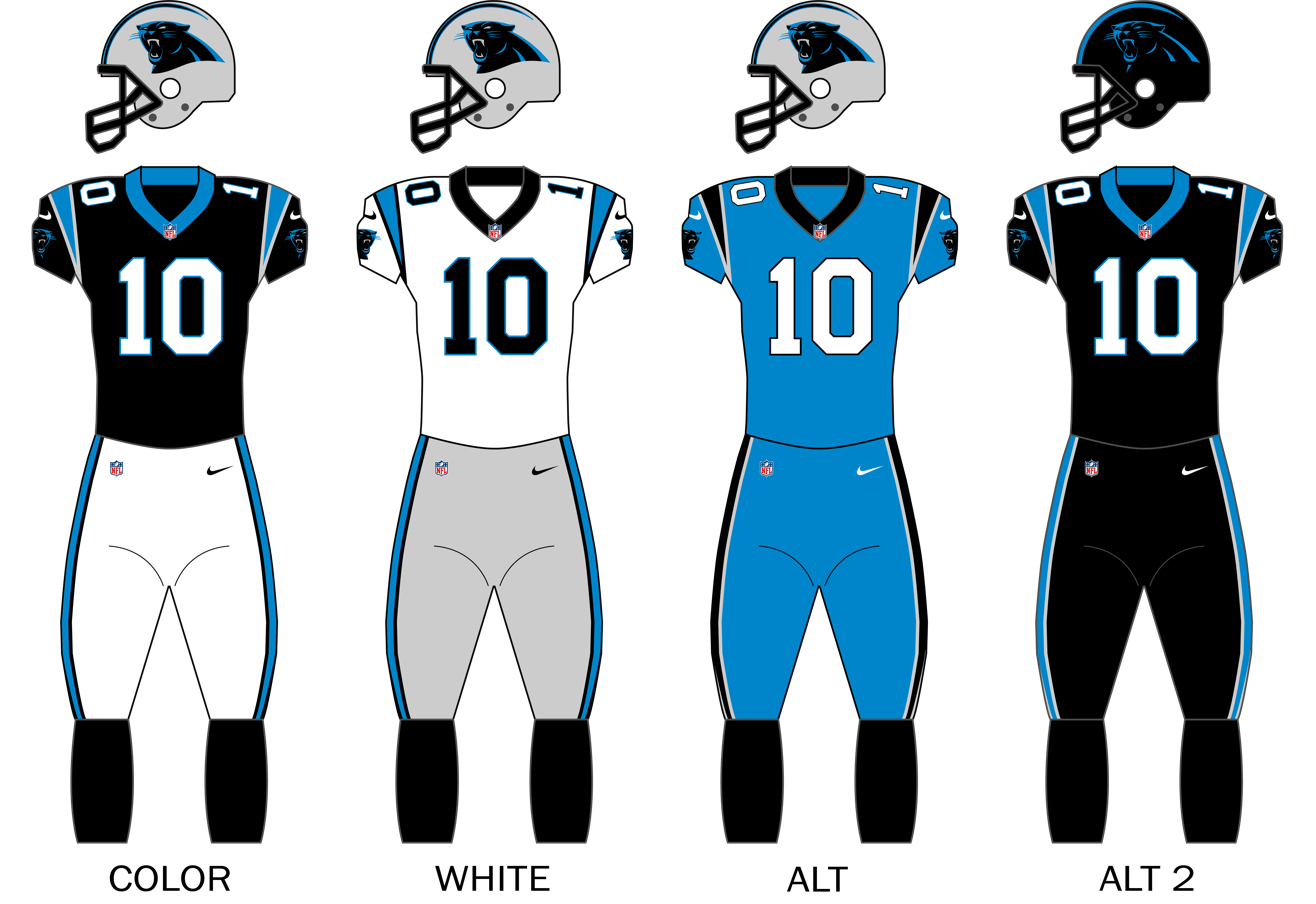

The 2025 season was the Carolina Panthers' 31st in the National Football League (NFL) and their second under the head coach/general manager tandem of Dave Canales and Dan Morgan. The Panthers improved upon their 5–12 record from 2024 after an overtime win against the Atlanta Falcons in Week 11. Carolina returned to the playoffs for the first time since 2017, and won their first NFC South division title since 2015. The Panthers notably pulled off a 31–28 upset win at home against the NFC-leading Los Angeles Rams in Week 13.

For the first time since 2014, linebacker Shaq Thompson was not on the roster, as he was released on February 24. With their victory on October 19, the Panthers jumped to a 4–3 record. It was the first time the team had been over .500 since 2021. The Panthers' .471 winning percentage was their best since 2017. However, losses in their final two games would seal the Panthers’ eighth consecutive losing season, finishing the regular season with a Week 18 defeat at the Tampa Bay Buccaneers. This loss cost the Panthers a chance to clinch the division outright. However, a victory by the Atlanta Falcons over the New Orleans Saints on the following day gave Carolina the division title anyway due to a three-way tie with head-to-head advantage.

The Panthers became the fifth team in NFL history to win a division with a losing record in a full season, joining the 2010 Seattle Seahawks, Carolina's 2014 squad, the 2020 Washington Football Team, and the 2022 Tampa Bay Buccaneers. This also made Carolina the first team in NFL history to win two division titles with a losing record. Despite the turnaround season, however, their season would come to an abrupt end as the Panthers lost to the Los Angeles Rams with a score of 34–31 in the Wild Card Round. Rookie wide receiver Tetairoa McMillan won the Offensive Rookie of the Year award after catching 70 passes for 1,014 yards and 7 scores.

The Carolina Panthers drew an average home attendance of 72,311, the 8th-highest of all NFL teams.

== Draft ==
2025 Carolina Panthers draft selections
| Round | Selection | Player | Position | College | Notes |
|---|---|---|---|---|---|
| 1 | 8 | Tetairoa McMillan | WR | Arizona | |
| 2 | 39 | Traded to the Chicago Bears (Note: The Panthers traded a second-round selection, 2023 first- and second-round selections (9th and 61st overall), a 2024 first-round selection (1st overall) and WR D. J. Moore to the Chicago Bears in exchange for a 2023 first-round selection (1st overall).) | | | |
| 2 | 51 | Nic Scourton | EDGE | Texas A&M | From Broncos (Note: The Panthers traded a 2nd round selection (57th overall), a 3rd round selection (74th overall), a fourth round selection (111th overall) and a seventh-round selection (230th overall) to the Denver Broncos in exchange for a second round selection (51st overall), a third round selection (85th overall), a fourth round selection (122nd overall), and a sixth-round selection (208th overall).) |
| 2 | 57 | Traded to the Denver Broncos | | | From Rams (Note: The Panthers traded a 2024 second-round selection (39th overall) to the Los Angeles Rams in exchange for a second-round selection, and 2024 second- and fifth-round selections (52nd and 155th overall).) |
| 3 | 74 | Traded to the Denver Broncos | | | |
| 3 | 77 | Princely Umanmielen | EDGE | Ole Miss | From Patriots (Note: The Panthers traded a 3rd round pick (85th overall) and a fifth round selection (146th overall) to the Patriots for a third round selection (77th overall).) |
| 3 | 85 | Traded to the New England Patriots | | | From Broncos |
| 4 | 111 | Traded to the Denver Broncos | | | |
| 4 | 114 | Trevor Etienne | RB | Georgia | From Cowboys (Note: The Panthers traded a seventh-round selection and WR Jonathan Mingo to the Dallas Cowboys in exchange for a fourth-round selection (114th overall).) |
| 4 | 122 | Lathan Ransom | S | Ohio State | From Broncos |
| 5 | 140 | Cam Jackson | DT | Florida | From Giants (Note: The Panthers traded a 2024 fifth-round selection and LB Brian Burns to the New York Giants in exchange for a conditional fifth-round selection (140th overall), and 2024 second- and fifth-round selections.) |
| 5 | 146 | Traded to the New England Patriots | | | |
| 5 | 163 | Mitchell Evans | TE | Notre Dame | From Ravens (Note: The Panthers traded a sixth-round selection and WR Diontae Johnson to the Baltimore Ravens in exchange for a fifth-round selection.) |
| 6 | 183 | Traded to the Baltimore Ravens | | | |
| 6 | 208 | Jimmy Horn Jr. | WR | Colorado | From Broncos |
| 7 | 226 | Traded to the Kansas City Chiefs (Note: The Panthers traded a conditional seventh-round selection to the Kansas City Chiefs in exchange for a conditional seventh-round selection and WR Ihmir Smith-Marsette.) | | | From 49ers (Note: The Panthers traded a conditional seventh-round selection and K Zane Gonzalez to the San Francisco 49ers in exchange for a conditional seventh-round selection.) |
| 7 | 230 | Traded to the Denver Broncos | | | From Cardinals (Note: The Panthers traded WR Robbie Chosen to the Arizona Cardinals in exchange for a seventh-round selection and a 2024 sixth-round selection.) |
| 7 | 247 | Traded to the Dallas Cowboys | | | |

2025 Carolina Panthers undrafted free agents
| Name | Position | College | Ref. |
|---|---|---|---|
| JaTravis Broughton | CB | TCU | |
| Ryan Fitzgerald | K | Florida State | |
| Ethan Garbers | QB | UCLA | |
| Jacolby George | WR | Miami (FL) | |
| Isaac Gifford | S | Nebraska | |
| Jared Harrison-Hunte | DE | SMU | |
| Jack Henderson | S | Minnesota | |
| Kobe Hudson | WR | UCF | |
| Luke Kandra | OL | Cincinnati | |
| Steven Losoya | OL | Vanderbilt | |
| Kay'Ron Lynch-Adams | RB | Michigan State | |
| Bam Martin-Scott | LB | South Carolina | |
| Moose Muhammad III | WR | Texas A&M | |
| Tuasivi Nomura | LB | Fresno State | |
| Bryce Pierre | TE | UCLA | |
| Michael Reid | CB | South Dakota | |
| Michael Tarquin | OL | Oklahoma | |
| Trevian Thomas | S | Arkansas State | |
| Corey Thornton | CB | Louisville | |

Draft trades

== Staff ==
2025 Carolina Panthers staff
| Front office: Owner – David Tepper; President – Kristi Coleman; President of football operations/general manager – Dan Morgan; Executive vice president of football operations – Brandt Tilis; Vice president of football analytics - Eric Eager; Vice president of development/football administration – Brian Decker; Director of pro scouting – Lee McNeill; Director of college scouting – Jared Kirksey; Assistant director of college scouting – Dave Whittington; Head coaches: Head coach – Dave Canales; Assistant head coach/run game coordinator – Harold Goodwin; Offensive coaches: Offensive coordinator – Brad Idzik; Quarterbacks – Will Harriger; Assistant quarterbacks coach/pass game specialist – Mike Bercovici; Running backs – Bernie Parmalee; Wide receivers – Rob Moore; Tight ends – Pat McPherson; Offensive line – Joe Gilbert; Offensive assistant – Keyshawn Colmon; Offensive quality control – Dean Petzing | Defensive coaches: Defensive coordinator – Ejiro Evero; Defensive passing game coordinator – Jonathan Cooley; Defensive line – Todd Wash; Linebackers – Peter Hansen; Outside linebackers – A.C. Carter; Assistant linebackers coach – Mayur Chaudhari; Secondary – Renaldo Hill; Senior defensive assistant – Dom Capers; Defensive assistant – Kevin Peterson; Special teams coaches: Special teams coordinator – Tracy Smith; Assistant special teams coordinator – Daren Bates; Strength and conditioning: Strength and conditioning – Jeremy Scott; Strength and conditioning assistant/return to play coordinator – Thomas Barbeau; Human performance assistant – Timothy Rabas |

== Final roster ==
2025 Carolina Panthers roster
| Quarterbacks (QB): 14 Andy Dalton; 9 Bryce Young; Running backs (RB): 5 Rico Dowdle; 23 Trevor Etienne; 30 Chuba Hubbard; Wide receivers (WR): 18 Jalen Coker; 15 Jimmy Horn Jr.; 17 Xavier Legette; 4 Tetairoa McMillan; 83 David Moore; 87 Brycen Tremayne; Tight ends (TE): 84 Mitchell Evans; 85 James Mitchell; 82 Tommy Tremble | Offensive linemen (OL): 63 Austin Corbett G/C; 74 Jake Curhan T; 79 Ikem Ekwonu T; 50 Robert Hunt G; 68 Damien Lewis G; 64 Cade Mays C; 72 Taylor Moton T; 77 Yosh Nijman T; 60 Nick Samac C; Defensive linemen (DL): 97 Bobby Brown III NT; 95 Derrick Brown DE; 75 Jared Harrison-Hunte DE; 92 Cam Jackson DE; 93 LaBryan Ray DE; 94 A'Shawn Robinson DE; 99 Tershawn Wharton NT | Linebackers (LB): 40 Krys Barnes ILB; 53 Claudin Cherelus ILB; 52 Trevis Gipson OLB; 48 Thomas Incoom OLB; 57 Bam Martin-Scott ILB; 55 Maema Njongmeta ILB; 56 Christian Rozeboom ILB; 11 Nic Scourton OLB; 27 Isaiah Simmons ILB; 3 Princely Umanmielen OLB; 98 D. J. Wonnum OLB; Defensive backs (DB): 20 D'Anthony Bell FS; 29 Akayleb Evans CB; 8 Jaycee Horn CB; 2 Mike Jackson CB; 7 Tre'von Moehrig SS; 22 Lathan Ransom SS; 33 Robert Rochell CB; 21 Nick Scott FS; 26 Chau Smith-Wade CB; Special teams (ST): 10 Ryan Fitzgerald K; 44 J. J. Jansen LS; 6 Sam Martin P | Practice squad: 65 Ja'Tyre Carter G; 78 Saahdiq Charles G; 88 Dan Chisena WR; 96 Jaden Crumedy DE; 81 Ross Dwelley TE; 37 Montrell Johnson Jr. RB; 35 David Long CB; 49 Jamil Muhammad OLB; 58 Mapalo Mwansa ILB (IPP); 45 Bryce Pierre TE; 86 Ja'seem Reed WR; 36 Demani Richardson SS; 80 Ainias Smith WR; 34 Anthony Tyus III RB; 73 Brandon Walton T; 16 Mike White QB; 41 Jacoby Windmon OLB; Reserve: 78 Popo Aumavae NT (IR); 24 Jonathon Brooks RB (PUP); 70 Brady Christensen G (IR); 91 Patrick Jones II OLB (IR); 28 Damarri Mathis CB (IR); 0 Ja'Tavion Sanders TE (IR); 31 Corey Thornton CB (IR); 32 Trevin Wallace ILB (IR); 62 Chandler Zavala G (IR); Rookies in italics 53 active, 9 reserve, 16 practice squad (1 exempt) |

== Preseason ==
| Week | Date | Opponent | Result | Record | Venue | Recap |
|---|---|---|---|---|---|---|
| 1 | August 8 | Cleveland Browns | L 10–30 | 0–1 | Bank of America Stadium | Recap |
| 2 | August 16 | at Houston Texans | L 3–20 | 0–2 | NRG Stadium | Recap |
| 3 | August 21 | Pittsburgh Steelers | L 10–19 | 0–3 | Bank of America Stadium | Recap |

== Regular season ==
=== Schedule ===
| Week | Date | Opponent | Result | Record | Venue | Recap |
|---|---|---|---|---|---|---|
| 1 | September 7 | at Jacksonville Jaguars | **L** 10–26 | 0–1 | EverBank Stadium | Recap |
| 2 | September 14 | at Arizona Cardinals | **L** 22–27 | 0–2 | State Farm Stadium | Recap |
| 3 | September 21 | **Atlanta Falcons** | **W** 30–0 | 1–2 | Bank of America Stadium | Recap |
| 4 | September 28 | at New England Patriots | **L** 13–42 | 1–3 | Gillette Stadium | Recap |
| 5 | October 5 | Miami Dolphins | **W** 27–24 | 2–3 | Bank of America Stadium | Recap |
| 6 | October 12 | Dallas Cowboys | **W** 30–27 | 3–3 | Bank of America Stadium | Recap |
| 7 | October 19 | at New York Jets | **W** 13–6 | 4–3 | MetLife Stadium | Recap |
| 8 | October 26 | Buffalo Bills | **L** 9–40 | 4–4 | Bank of America Stadium | Recap |
| 9 | November 2 | at Green Bay Packers | **W** 16–13 | 5–4 | Lambeau Field | Recap |
| 10 | November 9 | **New Orleans Saints** | **L** 7–17 | 5–5 | Bank of America Stadium | Recap |
| 11 | November 16 | at **Atlanta Falcons** | **W** 30–27 (OT) | 6–5 | Mercedes-Benz Stadium | Recap |
| 12 | November 24 | at San Francisco 49ers | **L** 9–20 | 6–6 | Levi's Stadium | Recap |
| 13 | November 30 | Los Angeles Rams | **W** 31–28 | 7–6 | Bank of America Stadium | Recap |
| 14 | Bye | | | | | |
| 15 | December 14 | at **New Orleans Saints** | **L** 17–20 | 7–7 | Caesars Superdome | Recap |
| 16 | December 21 | **Tampa Bay Buccaneers** | **W** 23–20 | 8–7 | Bank of America Stadium | Recap |
| 17 | December 28 | Seattle Seahawks | **L** 10–27 | 8–8 | Bank of America Stadium | Recap |
| 18 | January 3 | at **Tampa Bay Buccaneers** | **L** 14–16 | 8–9 | Raymond James Stadium | Recap |

Note: Intra-division opponents are in bold text.

=== Game summaries ===
==== Week 1: at Jacksonville Jaguars ====
Week 1: Carolina Panthers at Jacksonville Jaguars – Game summary

| Quarter | 1 | 2 | 3 | 4 | Total |
|---|---|---|---|---|---|
| Panthers | 3 | 0 | 0 | 7 | **10** |
| **Jaguars** | 3 | 17 | 0 | 6 | **26** |

at EverBank Stadium, Jacksonville, Florida

- Date: September 7
- Game time: 1:00 p.m. EDT
- Game weather: Mostly cloudy, 85 °F (29 °C)
- Game attendance: 59,957
- Referee: Alex Moore
- TV announcers (Fox): Chris Myers, Mark Schlereth and Jen Hale
- Recap, Game Book

Game information

**First quarter**

- JAX – Cam Little 35-yard field goal, 8:15. Jaguars 3–0. **Drive: 13 plays, 55 yards, 6:45.**
- CAR – Ryan Fitzgerald 48-yard field goal, 0:36. Tied 3–3. **Drive: 13 plays, 41 yards, 7:39.**

**Second quarter**

- JAX – Hunter Long 6-yard pass from Trevor Lawrence (Cam Little kick), 8:32. Jaguars 10–3. **Drive: 8 plays, 35 yards, 4:12.**
- JAX – Brian Thomas Jr. 9-yard run (Cam Little kick), 1:49. Jaguars 17–3. **Drive: 4 plays, 91 yards, 1:50.**
- JAX – Cam Little 47-yard field goal, 0:01. Jaguars 20–3. **Drive: 6 plays, 39 yards, 0:47.**

**Third quarter**

- No scoring plays.

**Fourth quarter**

- JAX – Cam Little 36-yard field goal, 7:09. Jaguars 23–3. **Drive: 15 plays, 49 yards, 8:07.**
- CAR – Chuba Hubbard 27-yard pass from Bryce Young (Ryan Fitzgerald kick), 4:47. Jaguars 23–10. **Drive: 10 plays, 80 yards, 2:22.**
- JAX – Cam Little 28-yard field goal, 1:57. Jaguars 26–10. **Drive: 7 plays, 38 yards, 2:50.**

**Top passers**

- CAR – Bryce Young – 18/35, 154 yards, TD, 2 INT
- JAX – Trevor Lawrence – 19/31, 178 yards, TD, INT

**Top rushers**

- CAR – Chuba Hubbard – 16 rushes, 57 yards
- JAX – Travis Etienne – 16 rushes, 143 yards

**Top receivers**

- CAR – Tetairoa McMillan – 5 receptions, 68 yards
- JAX – Brenton Strange – 4 receptions, 59 yards

In the season opener, the Panthers lost to Jacksonville 10–26. They started the season 0–1 for the fourth consecutive season. The game featured a 66-minute weather delay due to lightning in the area.

==== Week 2: at Arizona Cardinals ====
Week 2: Carolina Panthers at Arizona Cardinals – Game summary

| Quarter | 1 | 2 | 3 | 4 | Total |
|---|---|---|---|---|---|
| Panthers | 3 | 0 | 6 | 13 | **22** |
| **Cardinals** | 10 | 10 | 7 | 0 | **27** |

at State Farm Stadium, Glendale, Arizona

- Date: September 14
- Game time: 4:05 p.m. EDT/1:05 p.m. MST
- Game weather: None (retractable roof closed)
- Game attendance: 64,003
- Referee: Ron Torbert
- TV announcers (CBS): Spero Dedes, Adam Archuleta and Aditi Kinkhabwala
- Recap, Game Book

Game information

**First quarter**

- ARI – 3-yard fumble recovery by Zaven Collins (Chad Ryland kick), 13:27. Cardinals 7–0.
- ARI – Chad Ryland 29-yard field goal, 5:19. Cardinals 10–0. **Drive: 6 plays, 37 yards, 3:34.**
- CAR – Ryan Fitzgerald 27-yard field goal, 0:50. Cardinals 10–3. **Drive: 9 plays, 55 yards, 4:29.**

**Second quarter**

- ARI – Chad Ryland 47-yard field goal, 1:55. Cardinals 13–3. **Drive: 10 plays, 61 yards, 5:24.**
- ARI – Michael Wilson 11-yard pass from Kyler Murray (Chad Ryland kick), 0:04. Cardinals 20–3. **Drive: 6 plays, 45 yards, 0:47.**

**Third quarter**

- ARI – James Conner 2-yard run (Chad Ryland kick), 9:23. Cardinals 27–3. **Drive: 9 plays, 71 yards, 5:37.**
- CAR – Hunter Renfrow 4-yard pass from Bryce Young (run failed), 2:06. Cardinals 27–9. **Drive: 14 plays, 76 yards, 7:17.**

**Fourth quarter**

- CAR – Chuba Hubbard 5-yard pass from Bryce Young (run failed), 5:05. Cardinals 27–15. **Drive: 14 plays, 88 yards, 5:27.**
- CAR – Hunter Renfrow 1-yard pass from Bryce Young (Ryan Fitzgerald kick), 1:58. Cardinals 27–22. **Drive: 12 plays, 76 yards, 2:33.**

**Top passers**

- CAR – Bryce Young – 35/55, 328 yards, 3 TD, INT
- ARI – Kyler Murray – 17/25, 220 yards, TD, INT

**Top rushers**

- CAR – Chuba Hubbard – 10 rushes, 38 yards
- ARI – James Conner – 11 rushes, 34 yards, TD

**Top receivers**

- CAR – Tetairoa McMillan – 6 receptions, 100 yards
- ARI – Trey McBride – 6 receptions, 78 yards

After scoring just three points in the first half and entering the fourth quarter trailing 27–3, the Panthers rallied in the second half and came close to defeating Arizona. However, the potential comeback fell short when Cardinals defensive end Calais Campbell sealed the game with a sack on Bryce Young. Carolina lost to Arizona 22–27 and fell to 0–2 on the season.

==== Week 3: vs. Atlanta Falcons ====
Week 3: Atlanta Falcons at Carolina Panthers – Game summary

| Quarter | 1 | 2 | 3 | 4 | Total |
|---|---|---|---|---|---|
| Falcons | 0 | 0 | 0 | 0 | **0** |
| **Panthers** | 7 | 3 | 10 | 10 | **30** |

at Bank of America Stadium, Charlotte, North Carolina

- Date: September 21
- Game time: 1:00 p.m. EDT
- Game weather: Sunny, 84 °F (29 °C)
- Game attendance: 71,129
- Referee: Craig Wrolstad
- TV announcers (Fox): Alex Faust, Matt Millen and Sarah Kustok
- Recap, Game Book

Game information

**First quarter**

- CAR – Bryce Young 4-yard run (Ryan Fitzgerald kick), 6:44. Panthers 7–0. **Drive: 9 plays, 61 yards, 4:06.**

**Second quarter**

- CAR – Ryan Fitzgerald 57-yard field goal, 5:24. Panthers 10–0. **Drive: 10 plays, 48 yards, 5:21.**

**Third quarter**

- CAR – Chau Smith-Wade 11-yard interception return (Ryan Fitzgerald kick), 11:39. Panthers 17–0.
- CAR – Ryan Fitzgerald 35-yard field goal, 4:48. Panthers 20–0. **Drive: 9 plays, 28 yards, 4:36.**

**Fourth quarter**

- CAR – Rico Dowdle 1-yard run (Ryan Fitzgerald kick), 10:48. Panthers 27–0. **Drive: 9 plays, 30 yards, 5:29.**
- CAR – Ryan Fitzgerald 41-yard field goal, 3:41. Panthers 30–0. **Drive: 7 plays, 21 yards, 4:21.**

**Top passers**

- ATL – Michael Penix Jr. – 18/36, 172 yards, INT
- CAR – Bryce Young – 16/24, 121 yards

**Top rushers**

- ATL – Bijan Robinson – 13 rushes, 72 yards
- CAR – Chuba Hubbard – 17 rushes, 73 yards

**Top receivers**

- ATL – Drake London – 5 receptions, 55 yards
- CAR – Tetairoa McMillan – 3 receptions, 48 yards

In the Panthers' home opener, Atlanta was first with the ball and they missed their field goal attempt. Carolina gets the ball and quarterback Bryce Young scores a touchdown. On their next possession, punt returner Trevor Etienne dropped the ball and it was recovered by Atlanta. The Falcons try for another field but missed again. In the second, Ryan Fitzgerald kicks a field goal. They go into the half with a 10–0 lead. In the third, Chau Smith-Wade intercepts a pass intended for Bijan Robinson and scores a touchdown. Towards the end of the third, Michael Penix Jr. threw another interception this time caught by cornerback Mike Jackson. In the fourth, Rico Dowdle scored a touchdown. In their next possession, Fitzgerald scored another field goal. Carolina shuts out Atlanta 30–0 and improves to 1–2. This was the Panthers' first shutout victory since the 2020 season.

==== Week 4: at New England Patriots ====
Week 4: Carolina Panthers at New England Patriots – Game summary

| Quarter | 1 | 2 | 3 | 4 | Total |
|---|---|---|---|---|---|
| Panthers | 6 | 0 | 0 | 7 | **13** |
| **Patriots** | 7 | 21 | 7 | 7 | **42** |

at Gillette Stadium, Foxborough, Massachusetts

- Date: September 28
- Game time: 1:00 p.m. EDT
- Game weather: Sunny, 76 °F (24 °C)
- Game attendance: 64,628
- Referee: Bill Vinovich
- TV announcers (Fox): Chris Myers, Mark Schlereth and Jen Hale
- Recap, Game Book

Game information

**First quarter**

- CAR – Tommy Tremble 7-yard pass from Bryce Young (kick failed, hit left upright), 10:51. Panthers 6–0. **Drive: 7 plays, 76 yards, 4:09.**
- NE – Marcus Jones 87-yard punt return (Andrés Borregales kick), 5:34. Patriots 7–6.

**Second quarter**

- NE – Drake Maye 5-yard run (Andrés Borregales kick), 14:54. Patriots 14–6. **Drive: 6 plays, 80 yards, 3:02.**
- NE – TreVeyon Henderson 5-yard run (Andrés Borregales kick), 5:48. Patriots 21–6. **Drive: 8 plays, 55 yards, 4:07.**
- NE – Antonio Gibson 1-yard run (Andrés Borregales kick), 1:57. Patriots 28–6. **Drive: 4 plays, 14 yards, 2:05.**

**Third quarter**

- NE – Hunter Henry 31-yard pass from Drake Maye (Andrés Borregales kick), 10:17. Patriots 35–6. **Drive: 8 plays, 78 yards, 4:43.**

**Fourth quarter**

- NE – Mack Hollins 4-yard pass from Drake Maye (Andrés Borregales kick), 14:13. Patriots 42–6. **Drive: 7 plays, 41 yards, 3:10.**
- CAR – Mitchell Evans 2-yard pass from Andy Dalton (Ryan Fitzgerald kick), 1:56. Patriots 42–13. **Drive: 13 plays, 91 yards, 6:45.**

**Top passers**

- CAR – Bryce Young – 18/30, 150 yards, TD
- NE – Drake Maye – 14/17, 203 yards, 2 TD

**Top rushers**

- CAR – Chuba Hubbard – 10 rushes, 49 yards
- NE – Rhamondre Stevenson – 9 rushes, 38 yards

**Top receivers**

- CAR – Tetairoa McMillan – 4 receptions, 62 yards
- NE – Stefon Diggs – 6 receptions, 101 yards

The Patriots proved to be too much for the Panthers, as the Panthers were blown out with a loss of 42–13. Carolina fell to 1–3 with the loss. This was their first loss in New England since 2009, as well as their second loss to the Patriots in five seasons.

==== Week 5: vs. Miami Dolphins ====
Week 5: Miami Dolphins at Carolina Panthers – Game summary

| Quarter | 1 | 2 | 3 | 4 | Total |
|---|---|---|---|---|---|
| Dolphins | 3 | 14 | 0 | 7 | **24** |
| **Panthers** | 0 | 10 | 3 | 14 | **27** |

at Bank of America Stadium, Charlotte, North Carolina

- Date: October 5
- Game time: 1:00 p.m. EDT
- Game weather: Mostly cloudy, 77 °F (25 °C)
- Game attendance: 72,301
- Referee: Clay Martin
- TV announcers (Fox): Eric Collins, Mark Schlereth and Jen Hale
- Recap, Game Book

Game information

**First quarter**

- MIA – Riley Patterson 43-yard field goal, 9:03. Dolphins 3–0. **Drive: 11 plays, 48 yards, 5:57.**

**Second quarter**

- MIA – De'Von Achane 10-yard pass from Tua Tagovailoa (Riley Patterson kick), 14:55. Dolphins 10–0. **Drive: 14 plays, 58 yards, 6:36.**
- MIA – Darren Waller 4-yard pass from Tua Tagovailoa (Riley Patterson kick), 10:48. Dolphins 17–0. **Drive: 5 plays, 49 yards, 3:13.**
- CAR – Xavier Legette 7-yard pass from Bryce Young (Ryan Fitzgerald kick), 3:24. Dolphins 17–7. **Drive: 12 plays, 76 yards, 7:24.**
- CAR – Ryan Fitzgerald 35-yard field goal, 0:00. Dolphins 17–10. **Drive: 11 plays, 59 yards, 1:47.**

**Third quarter**

- CAR – Ryan Fitzgerald 49-yard field goal, 12:15. Dolphins 17–13. **Drive: 5 plays, 39 yards, 2:45.**

**Fourth quarter**

- CAR – Rico Dowdle 1-yard run (Ryan Fitzgerald kick), 6:10. Panthers 20–17. **Drive: 7 plays, 85 yards, 4:02.**
- MIA – Jaylen Waddle 46-yard pass from Tua Tagovailoa (Riley Patterson kick), 4:42. Dolphins 24–20. **Drive: 3 plays, 57 yards, 1:28.**
- CAR – Mitchell Evans 4-yard pass from Bryce Young (Ryan Fitzgerald kick), 1:59. Panthers 27–24. **Drive: 8 plays, 83 yards, 2:43.**

**Top passers**

- MIA – Tua Tagovailoa – 27/36, 256 yards, 3 TD
- CAR – Bryce Young – 19/30, 198 yards, 2 TD, INT

**Top rushers**

- MIA – De'Von Achane – 10 rushes, 16 yards
- CAR – Rico Dowdle – 23 rushes, 206 yards, TD

**Top receivers**

- MIA – Jaylen Waddle – 6 receptions, 110 yards, TD
- CAR – Tetairoa McMillan – 6 receptions, 73 yards

The Panthers rallied from a 17–0 deficit late in the second quarter, en route to beat Miami 27–24. The Panthers outgained the Dolphins on the ground 237–19. The Panthers tied a franchise record with their 17-point comeback, improving to 4–117 (including playoffs) when trailing by 17 or more. Carolina improves to 2–3.

==== Week 6: vs. Dallas Cowboys ====
Week 6: Dallas Cowboys at Carolina Panthers – Game summary

| Quarter | 1 | 2 | 3 | 4 | Total |
|---|---|---|---|---|---|
| Cowboys | 3 | 14 | 7 | 3 | **27** |
| **Panthers** | 3 | 10 | 7 | 10 | **30** |

at Bank of America Stadium, Charlotte, North Carolina

- Date: October 12
- Game time: 1:00 p.m. EDT
- Game weather: Cloudy, 68 °F (20 °C)
- Game attendance: 71,619
- Referee: John Hussey
- TV announcers (Fox): Adam Amin, Greg Olsen and Pam Oliver
- Recap, Game Book

Game information

**First quarter**

- CAR – Ryan Fitzgerald 31-yard field goal, 9:08. Panthers 3–0. **Drive: 8 plays, 63 yards, 4:09.**
- DAL – Brandon Aubrey 23-yard field goal, 4:48. Tied 3–3. **Drive: 10 plays, 68 yards, 4:20.**

**Second quarter**

- DAL – Hunter Luepke 3-yard pass from Dak Prescott (Brandon Aubrey kick), 14:56. Cowboys 10–3. **Drive: 4 plays, 12 yards, 2:09.**
- CAR – Tetairoa McMillan 19-yard pass from Bryce Young (Ryan Fitzgerald kick), 11:29. Tied 10–10. **Drive: 6 plays, 65 yards, 3:27.**
- DAL – Jake Ferguson 19-yard pass from Dak Prescott (Brandon Aubrey kick), 3:39. Cowboys 17–10. **Drive: 13 plays, 77 yards, 7:50.**
- CAR – Ryan Fitzgerald 55-yard field goal, 0:20. Cowboys 17–13. **Drive: 9 plays, 29 yards, 3:19.**

**Third quarter**

- CAR – Rico Dowdle 36-yard pass from Bryce Young (Ryan Fitzgerald kick), 13:19. Panthers 20–17. **Drive: 4 plays, 80 yards, 1:41.**
- DAL – George Pickens 34-yard pass from Dak Prescott (Brandon Aubrey kick), 2:38. Cowboys 24–20. **Drive: 6 plays, 73 yards, 2:50.**

**Fourth quarter**

- CAR – Tetairoa McMillan 2-yard pass from Bryce Young (Ryan Fitzgerald kick), 12:20. Panthers 27–24. **Drive: 10 plays, 65 yards, 5:18.**
- DAL – Brandon Aubrey 28-yard field goal, 9:20. Tied 27–27. **Drive: 10 plays, 61 yards, 3:00.**
- CAR – Ryan Fitzgerald 33-yard field goal, 0:00. Panthers 30–27. **Drive: 15 plays, 71 yards, 6:07.**

**Top passers**

- DAL – Dak Prescott – 25/34, 261 yards, 3 TD
- CAR – Bryce Young – 17/25, 199 yards, 3 TD, INT

**Top rushers**

- DAL – Javonte Williams – 13 rushes, 29 yards
- CAR – Rico Dowdle – 30 rushes, 183 yards

**Top receivers**

- DAL – George Pickens – 9 receptions, 168 yards, TD
- CAR – Rico Dowdle – 4 receptions, 56 yards, TD

In a close game with the Cowboys, where both teams were tied at the end, Ryan Fitzgerald kicked the game-winning field goal. Carolina improved to 3–3, and to .500 for the first time since the 2021 season. This win was also the Panthers first win against Dallas since 2018, snapping a 3 game losing streak.

Panthers running back Rico Dowdle, who played for the Dallas Cowboys from 2020 to 2024, finished the game with 239 total yards from scrimmage, setting a new franchise record for Carolina.

==== Week 7: at New York Jets ====
Week 7: Carolina Panthers at New York Jets – Game summary

| Quarter | 1 | 2 | 3 | 4 | Total |
|---|---|---|---|---|---|
| **Panthers** | 3 | 7 | 3 | 0 | **13** |
| Jets | 0 | 3 | 0 | 3 | **6** |

at MetLife Stadium, East Rutherford, New Jersey

- Date: October 19
- Game time: 1:00 p.m. EDT
- Game weather: Mostly Sunny, 71 °F (22 °C)
- Game attendance: 71,047
- Referee: Brad Rogers
- TV announcers (Fox): Chris Myers, Mark Schlereth and Sarah Kustok
- Recap, Game Book

Game information

**First quarter**

- CAR – Ryan Fitzgerald 30-yard field goal, 5:42. Panthers 3–0. **Drive: 13 plays, 54 yards, 6:34.**

**Second quarter**

- NYJ – Nick Folk 34-yard field goal, 11:02. Tied 3–3. **Drive: 7 plays, 33 yards, 3:48.**
- CAR – Xavier Legette 3-yard pass from Bryce Young (Ryan Fitzgerald kick), 1:11. Panthers 10–3. **Drive: 7 plays, 52 yards, 2:30.**

**Third quarter**

- CAR – Ryan Fitzgerald 29-yard field goal, 10:40. Panthers 13–3. **Drive: 10 plays, 38 yards, 4:20.**

**Fourth quarter**

- NYJ – Nick Folk 47-yard field goal, 6:46. Panthers 13–6. **Drive: 9 plays, 56 yards, 2:27.**

**Top passers**

- CAR – Bryce Young – 15/25, 138 yards, TD
- NYJ – Tyrod Taylor – 10/22, 126 yards, 2 INT

**Top rushers**

- CAR – Rico Dowdle – 17 rushes, 79 yards
- NYJ – Breece Hall – 11 rushes, 38 yards

**Top receivers**

- CAR – Xavier Legette – 9 receptions, 92 yards, TD
- NYJ – Tyler Johnson – 3 receptions, 60 yards

The Panthers were the first to score in the first quarter, with a Ryan Fitzgerald 30-yard field goal. Nick Folk of the New York Jets tied it in the second, with a field goal. Carolina took back the lead when Bryce Young passed to Xavier Legette for a 3-yard touchdown, plus the PAT. Carolina scored a field goal in the third, while the Jets did the same in the fourth. The Panthers improved to 4–3. They went above .500 for the first time since the 2021 season.

==== Week 8: vs. Buffalo Bills ====
Week 8: Buffalo Bills at Carolina Panthers – Game summary

| Quarter | 1 | 2 | 3 | 4 | Total |
|---|---|---|---|---|---|
| **Bills** | 3 | 16 | 21 | 0 | **40** |
| Panthers | 0 | 3 | 0 | 6 | **9** |

at Bank of America Stadium, Charlotte, North Carolina

- Date: October 26
- Game time: 1:00 p.m. EDT
- Game weather: Mostly cloudy, 63 °F (17 °C)
- Game attendance: 73,505
- Referee: Craig Wrolstad
- TV announcers (Fox): Adam Amin, Greg Olsen and Pam Oliver
- Recap, Game Book

Game information

**First quarter**

- BUF – Matt Prater 45-yard field goal, 7:14. Bills 3–0. **Drive: 11 plays, 49 yards, 5:31.**

**Second quarter**

- BUF – Matt Prater 43-yard field goal, 13:03. Bills 6–0. **Drive: 12 plays, 58 yards, 5:37.**
- CAR – Ryan Fitzgerald 48-yard field goal, 8:58. Bills 6–3. **Drive: 9 plays, 35 yards, 4:05.**
- BUF – James Cook 64-yard run (kick failed, wide left), 7:23. Bills 12–3. **Drive: 3 plays, 77 yards, 1:35.**
- BUF – Josh Allen 1-yard run (Matt Prater kick), 1:48. Bills 19–3. **Drive: 1 play, 1 yard, 0:02.**

**Third quarter**

- BUF – Khalil Shakir 54-yard pass from Josh Allen (Matt Prater kick), 12:18. Bills 26–3. **Drive: 4 plays, 65 yards, 2:42.**
- BUF – James Cook 21-yard run (Matt Prater kick), 4:59. Bills 33–3. **Drive: 9 plays, 88 yards, 5:12.**
- BUF – Josh Allen 1-yard run (Matt Prater kick), 1:19. Bills 40–3. **Drive: 6 plays, 19 yards, 3:22.**

**Fourth quarter**

- CAR – Chuba Hubbard 3-yard run (kick failed, wide right), 10:33. Bills 40–9. **Drive: 13 plays, 67 yards, 5:46.**

**Top passers**

- BUF – Josh Allen – 12/19, 163 yards, TD
- CAR – Andy Dalton – 16/24, 175 yards, INT

**Top rushers**

- BUF – James Cook – 19 rushes, 216 yards, 2 TD
- CAR – Rico Dowdle – 8 rushes, 54 yards

**Top receivers**

- BUF – Khalil Shakir – 6 receptions, 88 yards, TD
- CAR – Tetairoa McMillan – 7 receptions, 99 yards

In this game against Buffalo, the Bills beat Carolina 40–9. With the loss, the Panthers fell to 4–4.

==== Week 9: at Green Bay Packers ====
Week 9: Carolina Panthers at Green Bay Packers – Game summary

| Quarter | 1 | 2 | 3 | 4 | Total |
|---|---|---|---|---|---|
| **Panthers** | 0 | 7 | 6 | 3 | **16** |
| Packers | 0 | 6 | 0 | 7 | **13** |

at Lambeau Field, Green Bay, Wisconsin

- Date: November 2
- Game time: 1:00 p.m. EST/12:00 p.m. CST
- Game weather: Cloudy, 47 °F (8 °C)
- Game attendance: 77,864
- Referee: Land Clark
- TV announcers (Fox): Adam Amin, Greg Olsen and Pam Oliver
- Recap, Game Book

Game information

**First quarter**

- No scoring plays

**Second quarter**

- GB – Brandon McManus 49-yard field goal, 7:53. Packers 3–0. **Drive: 9 plays, 49 yards, 5:02.**
- CAR – Rico Dowdle 5-yard run (Ryan Fitzgerald kick), 2:22. Panthers 7–3. **Drive: 10 plays, 76 yards, 5:31.**
- GB – Brandon McManus 27-yard field goal, 0:00. Panthers 7–6. **Drive: 10 plays, 50 yards, 2:22.**

**Third quarter**

- CAR – Rico Dowdle 1-yard run (kick short), 2:12. Panthers 13–6. **Drive: 8 plays, 38 yards, 4:15.**

**Fourth quarter**

- GB – Josh Jacobs 1-yard run (Brandon McManus kick), 2:01. Tied 13–13. **Drive: 12 plays, 71 yards, 4:52.**
- CAR – Ryan Fitzgerald 49-yard field goal, 0:00. Panthers 16–13. **Drive: 9 plays, 40 yards, 2:32.**

**Top passers**

- CAR – Bryce Young – 11/20, 102 yards, INT
- GB – Jordan Love – 26/37, 273 yards, INT

**Top rushers**

- CAR – Rico Dowdle – 25 rushes, 130 yards, 2 TD
- GB – Josh Jacobs – 17 rushes, 87 yards, TD

**Top receivers**

- CAR – Tetairoa McMillan – 4 receptions, 46 yards
- GB – Romeo Doubs – 7 receptions, 91 yards

It was a scoreless first quarter for both the Panthers and Packers. In the second, Brandon McManus kicked a 49-yard field goal for Green Bay. Rico Dowdle scored a 5-yard touchdown for Carolina, plus the PAT. McManus kicked another field goal for Green Bay. Carolina went into the half with a 7–6 lead. Dowdle scored again in the third but the extra point attempt was no good. Green Bay tied it up in the fourth with a Josh Jacobs touchdown. With just one second remaining, Ryan Fitzgerald nailed a 49-yard field goal to lift the Panthers to a thrilling 16–13 victory.

Despite entering the game as two-touchdown underdogs, the Panthers pulled off one of the biggest upsets of the NFL this season. With the upset win, the Panthers improved to 5–4. This was their first win against the Packers since 2017 and their first win at Green Bay since 2008.

==== Week 10: vs. New Orleans Saints ====
Week 10: New Orleans Saints at Carolina Panthers – Game summary

| Quarter | 1 | 2 | 3 | 4 | Total |
|---|---|---|---|---|---|
| **Saints** | 3 | 7 | 0 | 7 | **17** |
| Panthers | 7 | 0 | 0 | 0 | **7** |

at Bank of America Stadium, Charlotte, North Carolina

- Date: November 9
- Game time: 1:00 p.m. EST
- Game weather: Partly cloudy, 73 °F (23 °C)
- Game attendance: 72,804
- Referee: Brad Allen
- TV announcers (Fox): Chris Myers, Mark Schlereth and Jen Hale
- Recap, Game Book

Game information

**First quarter**

- CAR – Rico Dowdle 5-yard run (Ryan Fitzgerald kick), 7:59. Panthers 7–0. **Drive: 12 plays, 67 yards, 7:01.**
- NO – Blake Grupe 21-yard field goal, 2:52. Panthers 7–3. **Drive: 10 plays, 78 yards, 5:07.**

**Second quarter**

- NO – Chris Olave 62-yard pass from Tyler Shough (Blake Grupe kick), 9:21. Saints 10–7. **Drive: 7 plays, 75 yards, 3:57.**

**Third quarter**

- No scoring plays

**Fourth quarter**

- NO – Juwan Johnson 30-yard pass from Tyler Shough (Blake Grupe kick), 10:20. Saints 17–7. **Drive: 5 plays, 43 yards, 2:34.**

**Top passers**

- NO – Tyler Shough – 19/27, 282 yards, 2 TD
- CAR – Bryce Young – 17/25, 124 yards, INT

**Top rushers**

- NO – Alvin Kamara – 22 rushes, 83 yards
- CAR – Rico Dowdle – 18 rushes, 53 yards, TD

**Top receivers**

- NO – Chris Olave – 5 receptions, 104 yards, TD
- CAR – Tetairoa McMillan – 5 receptions, 60 yards

==== Week 11: at Atlanta Falcons ====
Week 11: Carolina Panthers at Atlanta Falcons – Game summary

| Quarter | 1 | 2 | 3 | 4 | OT | Total |
|---|---|---|---|---|---|---|
| **Panthers** | 7 | 3 | 9 | 8 | 3 | **30** |
| Falcons | 7 | 14 | 0 | 6 | 0 | **27** |

at Mercedes-Benz Stadium, Atlanta, Georgia

- Date: November 16
- Game time: 1:00 p.m. EST
- Game weather: Mostly sunny, 72 °F (22 °C) (retractable roof open)
- Game attendance: 70,739
- Referee: Clay Martin
- TV announcers (Fox): Jason Benetti, Brady Quinn and Sarah Kustok
- Recap, Game Book

Game information

**First quarter**

- CAR – Tetairoa McMillan 7-yard pass from Bryce Young (Ryan Fitzgerald kick), 5:25. Panthers 7–0. **Drive: 12 plays, 73 yards, 7:30.**
- ATL – Bijan Robinson 4-yard run (Zane Gonzalez kick), 3:33. Tied 7–7. **Drive: 4 plays, 75 yards, 1:52.**

**Second quarter**

- ATL – Bijan Robinson 1-yard run (Zane Gonzalez kick), 7:52. Falcons 14–7. **Drive: 13 plays, 95 yards, 8:07.**
- ATL – Tyler Allgeier 1-yard run (Zane Gonzalez kick), 1:41. Falcons 21–7. **Drive: 7 plays, 59 yards, 3:43.**
- CAR – Ryan Fitzgerald 29-yard field goal, 0:25. Falcons 21–10. **Drive: 7 plays, 58 yards, 1:16.**

**Third quarter**

- CAR – Xavier Legette 36-yard pass from Bryce Young (pass failed), 12:04. Falcons 21–16. **Drive: 5 plays, 68 yards, 2:56.**
- CAR – Ryan Fitzgerald 34-yard field goal, 0:58. Falcons 21–19. **Drive: 10 plays, 63 yards, 4:14.**

**Fourth quarter**

- ATL – Zane Gonzalez 52-yard field goal, 2:43. Falcons 24–19. **Drive: 4 plays, 5 yards, 0:19.**
- CAR – Tetairoa McMillan 12-yard pass from Bryce Young (Bryce Young–Jalen Coker pass), 1:08. Panthers 27–24. **Drive: 9 plays, 65 yards, 1:35.**
- ATL – Zane Gonzalez 45-yard field goal, 0:16. Tied 27–27. **Drive: 6 plays, 28 yards, 0:52.**

**Overtime**

- CAR – Ryan Fitzgerald 28-yard field goal, 5:10. Panthers 30–27. **Drive: 6 plays, 60 yards, 3:35.**

**Top passers**

- CAR – Bryce Young – 31/45, 448 yards, 3 TD
- ATL – Michael Penix Jr. – 13/16, 175 yards

**Top rushers**

- CAR – Rico Dowdle – 19 rushes, 45 yards
- ATL – Bijan Robinson – 23 rushes, 104 yards, 2 TD

**Top receivers**

- CAR – Tetairoa McMillan – 8 receptions, 130 yards, 2 TD
- ATL – Drake London – 7 receptions, 119 yards

Carolina opened the game with a 7-yard touchdown pass to Tetairoa McMillan, and Atlanta answered with a touchdown by Bijan Robinson. In the second quarter, Robinson and Tyler Allgeier each scored a touchdown for the Falcons, giving them the lead. Near the end of the half, Ryan Fitzgerald kicked a field goal for Carolina, and the Panthers entered halftime trailing 10–21. Early in the third quarter, Bryce Young threw a 36-yard touchdown to Xavier Legette, though the two-point conversion attempt was unsuccessful. On Atlanta’s ensuing possession, the Falcons fumbled and Carolina recovered, but the Panthers failed to convert the takeaway into points. Carolina scored a field goal on their next drive, cutting the deficit to two. Atlanta responded with a field goal by Zane Gonzalez with 2:43 remaining. McMillan then scored another touchdown for Carolina, followed by a successful two-point conversion by Jalen Coker. The Falcons tied the game at 27 with 16 seconds left, sending it to overtime. For the third time this season, Fitzgerald kicked a game-winning field goal, securing a 30–27 victory for Carolina.

With their second overtime win in Atlanta, the Panthers improved to 6–5 for the first time since 2018, and swept the Falcons for the first time since 2013 season.

One week after struggling against the Saints, Bryce Young rebounded by completing 31-of-45 passes for 448 yards and three touchdowns. His 448 passing yards set a new Panthers franchise record for the most passing yards in a game, surpassing the 432 yards thrown by Cam Newton against the Green Bay Packers on September 18, 2011.

==== Week 12: at San Francisco 49ers ====
Week 12: Carolina Panthers at San Francisco 49ers – Game summary

| Quarter | 1 | 2 | 3 | 4 | Total |
|---|---|---|---|---|---|
| Panthers | 0 | 3 | 6 | 0 | **9** |
| **49ers** | 7 | 3 | 7 | 3 | **20** |

at Levi's Stadium, Santa Clara, California

- Date: November 24
- Game time: 8:15 p.m. EST/5:15 p.m. PST
- Game weather: Sunny, 58 °F (14 °C)
- Game attendance: 71,337
- Referee: Alex Kemp
- TV announcers (ESPN): Joe Buck, Troy Aikman, Lisa Salters and Laura Rutledge
- Recap, Game Book

Game information

**First quarter**

- SF – Jauan Jennings 12-yard pass from Brock Purdy (Matt Gay kick), 6:17. 49ers 7–0. **Drive: 15 plays, 72 yards, 8:43.**

**Second quarter**

- CAR – Ryan Fitzgerald 25-yard field goal, 2:28. 49ers 7–3. **Drive: 7 plays, 26 yards, 3:51.**
- SF – Matt Gay 47-yard field goal, 1:00. 49ers 10–3. **Drive: 6 plays, 25 yards, 1:28.**

**Third quarter**

- SF – Christian McCaffrey 12-yard run (Matt Gay kick), 4:42. 49ers 17–3. **Drive: 13 plays, 80 yards, 7:43.**
- CAR – Tetairoa McMillan 29-yard pass from Bryce Young (pass failed), 0:49. 49ers 17–9. **Drive: 8 plays, 68 yards, 3:53.**

**Fourth quarter**

- SF – Matt Gay 29-yard field goal, 9:21. 49ers 20–9. **Drive: 10 plays, 59 yards, 6:28.**

**Top passers**

- CAR – Bryce Young – 18/29, 169 yards, TD, 2 INT
- SF – Brock Purdy – 23/32, 193 yards, TD, 3 INT

**Top rushers**

- CAR – Rico Dowdle – 6 rushes, 38 yards
- SF – Christian McCaffrey – 24 rushes, 89 yards, TD

**Top receivers**

- CAR – Rico Dowdle – 4 receptions, 36 yards
- SF – George Kittle – 6 receptions, 78 yards

The Panthers faced their former running back, Christian McCaffrey for the first time since trading him to San Francisco during the 2022 season. McCaffrey recorded 142 yards from scrimmage and a touchdown, contributing to a 49ers's 20–9 victory despite quarterback Brock Purdy throwing three first-half interceptions.

Late in the game, Tre'von Moehrig struck 49ers wide receiver Jauan Jennings in the groin following a run play. After the game, Jennings responded by punching Moehrig in the helmet. The NFL subsequently suspended Moehrig for one game without pay, while Jennings was fined $12,172 for his actions. Carolina falls to 6–6.

==== Week 13: vs. Los Angeles Rams ====
Week 13: Los Angeles Rams at Carolina Panthers – Game summary

| Quarter | 1 | 2 | 3 | 4 | Total |
|---|---|---|---|---|---|
| Rams | 7 | 14 | 0 | 7 | **28** |
| **Panthers** | 14 | 3 | 7 | 7 | **31** |

at Bank of America Stadium, Charlotte, North Carolina

- Date: November 30
- Game time: 1:00 p.m. EST
- Game weather: Cloudy, 45 °F (7 °C)
- Game attendance: 71,292
- Referee: Scott Novak (with Adrian Hill's crew)
- TV announcers (Fox): Adam Amin, Drew Brees and Kristina Pink
- Recap, Game Book

Game information

**First quarter**

- LAR – Davante Adams 4-yard pass from Matthew Stafford (Harrison Mevis kick), 12:10. Rams 7–0. **Drive: 6 plays, 35 yards, 2:50.**
- CAR – Chuba Hubbard 35-yard pass from Bryce Young (Ryan Fitzgerald kick), 7:38. Tied 7–7. **Drive: 9 plays, 69 yards, 4:32.**
- CAR – Mike Jackson 48-yard interception return (Ryan Fitzgerald kick), 1:10. Panthers 14–7.

**Second quarter**

- LAR – Davante Adams 7-yard pass from Matthew Stafford (Harrison Mevis kick), 12:46. Tied 14–14. **Drive: 7 plays, 64 yards, 3:24.**
- CAR – Ryan Fitzgerald 33-yard field goal, 5:33. Panthers 17–14. **Drive: 12 plays, 60 yards, 7:13.**
- LAR – Blake Corum 2-yard run (Harrison Mevis kick), 1:55. Rams 21–17. **Drive: 7 plays, 80 yards, 3:38.**

**Third quarter**

- CAR – Jalen Coker 33-yard pass from Bryce Young (Ryan Fitzgerald kick), 8:48. Panthers 24–21. **Drive: 10 plays, 71 yards, 6:12.**

**Fourth quarter**

- LAR – Kyren Williams 7-yard run (Harrison Mevis kick), 9:58. Rams 28–24. **Drive: 6 plays, 89 yards, 3:36.**
- CAR – Tetairoa McMillan 43-yard pass from Bryce Young (Ryan Fitzgerald kick), 6:34. Panthers 31–28. **Drive: 6 plays, 65 yards, 3:24.**

**Top passers**

- LAR – Matthew Stafford – 18/28, 243 yards, 2 TD, 2 INT
- CAR – Bryce Young – 15/20, 206 yards, 3 TD

**Top rushers**

- LAR – Blake Corum – 7 rushes, 81 yards, TD
- CAR – Chuba Hubbard – 17 rushes, 83 yards

**Top receivers**

- LAR – Xavier Smith – 3 receptions, 82 yards
- CAR – Jalen Coker – 4 receptions, 74 yards, TD

Despite entering the game as 10-point underdogs to the Rams, the Panthers pulled off an upset win and kept their playoff hopes alive. L.A. starts the game with a Davante Adams touchdown. Carolina ties it with a Chuba Hubbard touchdown. In the Rams' next possession, Stafford throws a pass intended for Colby Parkinson in the end zone but it was intercepted by Nick Scott, ending Stafford's NFL record streak of 28 consecutive touchdown passes without an interception. It is a quick three and out for Carolina. Stafford throws it to Puka Nacua but it was intercepted by Mike Jackson for a pick six. In the beginning of the second, the Rams tie it at 14. Ryan Fitzgerald gives Carolina a three-point lead. At the end of the second quarter, the Rams take back the lead with a touchdown and go into the half with a 21–17 lead. Carolina starts the second half with a Jalen Coker touchdown. In the fourth, Kyren Williams scores a 7-yard touchdown for the Rams. Carolina takes back the lead with a Tetairoa McMillan touchdown. In the decisive moment of the fourth quarter, Derrick Brown, who had tipped the pass that led to Stafford's first interception, recorded a critical strip-sack with 2:25 remaining, helping secure Carolina's 31–28 victory. They improve to 7–6.

==== Week 15: at New Orleans Saints ====
Week 15: Carolina Panthers at New Orleans Saints – Game summary

| Quarter | 1 | 2 | 3 | 4 | Total |
|---|---|---|---|---|---|
| Panthers | 7 | 3 | 7 | 0 | **17** |
| **Saints** | 0 | 7 | 3 | 10 | **20** |

at Caesars Superdome, New Orleans, Louisiana

- Date: December 14
- Game time: 4:25 p.m. EST/3:25 p.m. CST
- Game weather: None (indoor stadium)
- Game attendance: 70,070
- Referee: Alex Moore
- TV announcers (Fox): Jason Benetti, Robert Griffin III and Sarah Kustok
- Recap, Game Book

Game information

**First quarter**

- CAR – Rico Dowdle 4-yard run (Ryan Fitzgerald kick), 6:39. Panthers 7–0. **Drive: 13 plays, 74 yards, 7:18.**

**Second quarter**

- NO – Devin Neal 4-yard run (Charlie Smyth kick), 3:32. Tied 7–7. **Drive: 17 plays, 95 yards, 11:22.**
- CAR – Ryan Fitzgerald 40-yard field goal, 0:21. Panthers 10–7. **Drive: 9 plays, 51 yards, 3:11.**

**Third quarter**

- CAR – Jalen Coker 32-yard pass from Bryce Young (Ryan Fitzgerald kick), 9:54. Panthers 17–7. **Drive: 8 plays, 70 yards, 5:06.**
- NO – Charlie Smyth 42-yard field goal, 1:56. Panthers 17–10. **Drive: 14 plays, 48 yards, 7:58.**

**Fourth quarter**

- NO – Chris Olave 12-yard pass from Tyler Shough (Charlie Smyth kick), 2:29. Tied 17–17. **Drive: 7 plays, 78 yards, 2:08.**
- NO – Charlie Smyth 47-yard field goal, 0:02. Saints 20–17. **Drive: 8 plays, 62 yards, 0:55.**

**Top passers**

- CAR – Bryce Young – 15/24, 163 yards, TD
- NO – Tyler Shough – 24/32, 272 yards, TD

**Top rushers**

- CAR – Rico Dowdle – 16 rushes, 49 yards, TD
- NO – Tyler Shough – 8 rushes, 32 yards

**Top receivers**

- CAR – Jalen Coker – 4 receptions, 60 yards, TD
- NO – Chris Olave – 6 receptions, 85 yards, TD

With the Buccaneers losing, the Panthers had a chance to pull away in the NFC South with a win against the Saints. In the first quarter, Carolina scored first on a Rico Dowdle touchdown. After an 11:22-minute drive in the second quarter, New Orleans tied the game, but the Panthers ended the quarter with a field goal to hold a three-point lead at halftime. Carolina opened the third quarter with a Jalen Coker touchdown, and the Saints responded with a Zach Wood field goal. With 2:33 remaining, New Orleans tied the contest on a Juwan Johnson touchdown and ultimately won with a game-winning 47-yard field goal. Carolina fell to 7–7.

==== Week 16: vs. Tampa Bay Buccaneers ====
Week 16: Tampa Bay Buccaneers at Carolina Panthers – Game summary

| Quarter | 1 | 2 | 3 | 4 | Total |
|---|---|---|---|---|---|
| Buccaneers | 7 | 3 | 7 | 3 | **20** |
| **Panthers** | 3 | 10 | 7 | 3 | **23** |

at Bank of America Stadium, Charlotte, North Carolina

- Date: December 21
- Game time: 1:00 p.m. EST
- Game weather: Partly cloudy, 61 °F (16 °C)
- Game attendance: 73,530
- Referee: Shawn Smith
- TV announcers (Fox): Chris Myers, Mark Schlereth and Jen Hale
- Recap, Game Book

Game information

**First quarter**

- CAR – Ryan Fitzgerald 27-yard field goal, 10:30. Panthers 3–0. **Drive: 9 plays, 56 yards, 4:30.**
- TB – Mike Evans 1-yard pass from Baker Mayfield (Chase McLaughlin kick), 4:01. Buccaneers 7–3. **Drive: 10 plays, 53 yards, 6:29.**

**Second quarter**

- TB – Chase McLaughlin 23-yard field goal, 8:09. Buccaneers 10–3. **Drive: 14 plays, 85 yards, 7:12.**
- CAR – Ryan Fitzgerald 41-yard field goal, 2:06. Buccaneers 10–6. **Drive: 6 plays, 16 yards, 2:19.**
- CAR – Tetairoa McMillan 22-yard pass from Bryce Young (Ryan Fitzgerald kick), 0:07. Panthers 13–10. **Drive: 8 plays, 63 yards, 0:59.**

**Third quarter**

- TB – Sean Tucker 1-yard run (Chase McLaughlin kick), 6:41. Buccaneers 17–13. **Drive: 14 plays, 66 yards, 8:19.**
- CAR – Ja'Tavion Sanders 6-yard pass from Bryce Young (Ryan Fitzgerald kick), 0:08. Panthers 20–17. **Drive: 11 plays, 65 yards, 6:33.**

**Fourth quarter**

- TB – Chase McLaughlin 50-yard field goal, 11:24. Tied 20–20. **Drive: 6 plays, 11 yards, 3:44.**
- CAR – Ryan Fitzgerald 48-yard field goal, 2:20. Panthers 23–20. **Drive: 7 plays, 43 yards, 2:26.**

**Top passers**

- TB – Baker Mayfield – 18/26, 145 yards, TD, INT
- CAR – Bryce Young – 21/32, 191 yards, 2 TD

**Top rushers**

- TB – Bucky Irving – 19 rushes, 71 yards
- CAR – Rico Dowdle – 9 rushes, 29 yards

**Top receivers**

- TB – Emeka Egbuka – 1 reception, 40 yards
- CAR – Tetairoa McMillan – 6 receptions, 73 yards, TD

In an important NFC South divisional game, Carolina scores first with a Ryan Fitzgerald field goal. Tampa Bay soon takes the lead with a Mike Evans 1-yard touchdown. The Bucs increase their lead by three in the second quarter with a field goal. In the last couple of minutes remaining in the half, the Panthers score twice with a Fitzgerald field goal and a Tetairoa McMillan 22-yard touchdown. The Panthers take back the lead heading into halftime. Tampa Bay scores in the third with a Sean Tucker touchdown. Carolina follows with a Ja'Tavion Sanders touchdown. Tampa Bay ties it in the fourth quarter, with a field goal. With 2:20 to go in the game, Carolina kicks a field goal. Baker Mayfield passed the ball intended for Evans but it was intercepted by Lathan Ransom which won the game for Carolina. The Panthers win 23–20 and improve to 8–7.

With the win, this is the first time since 2017 they have won more than seven games, and also the first time since 2022 they have beat Tampa Bay.

==== Week 17: vs. Seattle Seahawks ====
Week 17: Seattle Seahawks at Carolina Panthers – Game summary

| Quarter | 1 | 2 | 3 | 4 | Total |
|---|---|---|---|---|---|
| **Seahawks** | 3 | 0 | 14 | 10 | **27** |
| Panthers | 0 | 3 | 0 | 7 | **10** |

at Bank of America Stadium, Charlotte, North Carolina

- Date: December 28
- Game time: 1:00 p.m. EST
- Game weather: Cloudy, 43 °F (6 °C)
- Game attendance: 73,163
- Referee: Carl Cheffers
- TV announcers (CBS): Ian Eagle, J. J. Watt and Evan Washburn
- Recap, Game Book

Game information

**First quarter**

- SEA – Jason Myers 48-yard field goal, 3:23. Seahawks 3–0. **Drive: 9 plays, 40 yards, 5:04.**

**Second quarter**

- CAR – Ryan Fitzgerald 35-yard field goal, 3:46. Tied 3–3. **Drive: 4 plays, 9 yards, 1:33.**

**Third quarter**

- SEA – Zach Charbonnet 2-yard run (Jason Myers kick), 8:45. Seahawks 10–3. **Drive: 6 plays, 21 yards, 3:16.**
- SEA – AJ Barner 17-yard pass from Sam Darnold (Jason Myers kick), 5:32. Seahawks 17–3. **Drive: 4 plays, 29 yards, 2:09.**

**Fourth quarter**

- CAR – Bryce Young 10-yard run (Ryan Fitzgerald kick), 13:41. Seahawks 17–10. **Drive: 13 plays, 69 yards, 6:51.**
- SEA – Jason Myers 30-yard field goal, 5:33. Seahawks 20–10. **Drive: 14 plays, 55 yards, 8:08.**
- SEA – Zach Charbonnet 1-yard run (Jason Myers kick), 2:31. Seahawks 27–10. **Drive: 5 plays, 25 yards, 1:09.**

**Top passers**

- SEA – Sam Darnold – 18/27, 147 yards, TD, INT
- CAR – Bryce Young – 14/24, 54 yards

**Top rushers**

- SEA – Zach Charbonnet – 18 rushes, 110 yards, 2 TD
- CAR – Rico Dowdle – 12 rushes, 59 yards

**Top receivers**

- SEA – Jaxon Smith-Njigba – 9 receptions, 72 yards
- CAR – Jalen Coker – 2 receptions, 16 yards

After being tied at 3 going into halftime, Seattle outscored Carolina in the second half 24–7 to defeat the Panthers 27–10. With the loss, the Panthers fell to 8–8, finishing 1–3 against the NFC West and 5–3 at home. Despite the loss, the Buccaneers’ loss to the Dolphins set up an NFC South showdown in Week 18.

==== Week 18: at Tampa Bay Buccaneers ====
Week 18: Carolina Panthers at Tampa Bay Buccaneers – Game summary

| Quarter | 1 | 2 | 3 | 4 | Total |
|---|---|---|---|---|---|
| Panthers | 0 | 7 | 0 | 7 | **14** |
| **Buccaneers** | 10 | 3 | 0 | 3 | **16** |

at Raymond James Stadium, Tampa, Florida

- Date: January 3
- Game time: 4:30 p.m. EST
- Game weather: Rain, 69 °F (21 °C)
- Game attendance: 65,082
- Referee: Brad Allen
- TV announcers (ESPN/ABC): Chris Fowler, Dan Orlovsky, Louis Riddick, Katie George, and Peter Schrager
- Recap, Game Book

Game information

**First quarter**

- TB – Cade Otton 18-yard pass from Baker Mayfield (Chase McLaughlin kick), 9:31. Buccaneers 7–0. **Drive: 9 plays, 74 yards, 5:29.**
- TB – Chase McLaughlin 29-yard field goal, 1:57. Buccaneers 10–0. **Drive: 11 plays, 69 yards, 5:27.**

**Second quarter**

- CAR – Tommy Tremble 8-yard pass from Bryce Young (Ryan Fitzgerald kick), 10:50. Buccaneers 10–7. **Drive: 3 plays, 19 yards, 1:28.**
- TB – Chase McLaughlin 36-yard field goal, 0:02. Buccaneers 13–7. **Drive: 7 plays, 40 yards, 1:49.**

**Third quarter**

- No scoring plays

**Fourth quarter**

- TB – Chase McLaughlin 48-yard field goal, 14:12. Buccaneers 16–7. **Drive: 9 plays, 39 yards, 5:18.**
- CAR – Jalen Coker 8-yard pass from Bryce Young (Ryan Fitzgerald kick), 2:25. Buccaneers 16–14. **Drive: 8 plays, 72 yards, 2:45.**

**Top passers**

- CAR – Bryce Young – 24/35, 264 yards, 2 TD, INT
- TB – Baker Mayfield – 16/22, 203 yards, TD, INT

**Top rushers**

- CAR – Rico Dowdle – 7 rushes, 10 yards
- TB – Bucky Irving – 26 rushes, 85 yards

**Top receivers**

- CAR – Tetairoa McMillan – 4 receptions, 83 yards
- TB – Cade Otton – 7 receptions, 94 yards, TD

With the loss, the Panthers finished the regular season at 8–9, clinching their eighth consecutive losing season. Despite the loss, the Falcons' victory over the Saints the following day clinched the NFC South title for the Panthers. The Buccaneers, Panthers, and Falcons all finished the season with 8–9 records, but Carolina won the division based on head-to-head tiebreakers among the three teams. The Panthers went 3–1 in those matchups, compared to 2–2 for the Buccaneers and 1–3 for the Falcons, eliminating both teams from playoff contention.

The Panthers reached the playoffs for the first time since 2017 and captured the NFC South title for the first time since the 2015 season. They also became the first team in NFL history to win their division twice while finishing the regular season with a losing record. With the Los Angeles Rams defeating the Arizona Cardinals, the Panthers were scheduled to face the Rams in the Wild Card Round.

=== Standings ===
==== Division ====
NFC South
| | W | L | T | PCT | DIV | CONF | PF | PA | STK |
|---|---|---|---|---|---|---|---|---|---|
| ^{(4)} Carolina Panthers | 8 | 9 | 0 | .471 | 3–3 | 6–6 | 311 | 380 | L2 |
| Tampa Bay Buccaneers | 8 | 9 | 0 | .471 | 3–3 | 6–6 | 380 | 411 | W1 |
| Atlanta Falcons | 8 | 9 | 0 | .471 | 3–3 | 7–5 | 353 | 401 | W4 |
| New Orleans Saints | 6 | 11 | 0 | .353 | 3–3 | 4–8 | 306 | 383 | L1 |

==== Conference ====
NFC
| Seed | Team | Division | W | L | T | PCT | DIV | CONF | SOS | SOV | STK |
|---|---|---|---|---|---|---|---|---|---|---|---|
**Division leaders**
| 1 | Seattle Seahawks | West | 14 | 3 | 0 | .824 | 4–2 | 9–3 | .498 | .471 | W7 |
| 2 (Note: Chicago finished ahead of Philadelphia based on head-to-head victory.) | Chicago Bears | North | 11 | 6 | 0 | .647 | 2–4 | 7–5 | .458 | .406 | L2 |
| 3 | Philadelphia Eagles | East | 11 | 6 | 0 | .647 | 3–3 | 8–4 | .476 | .455 | L1 |
| 4 (Note: Carolina finished ahead of Tampa Bay and Atlanta based on head-to-head record (Carolina 3–1 to Tampa Bay 2–2 and Atlanta 1–3).) | Carolina Panthers | South | 8 | 9 | 0 | .471 | 3–3 | 6–6 | .522 | .463 | L2 |
**Wild cards**
| 5 (Note: LA Rams finished ahead of San Francisco based on common games (LA Rams 9–3 to San Francisco 8–4 against: Arizona, Atlanta, Carolina, Houston, Indianapolis, Jacksonville, New Orleans, Seattle, Tampa Bay and Tennessee).) | Los Angeles Rams | West | 12 | 5 | 0 | .706 | 4–2 | 7–5 | .526 | .485 | W1 |
| 6 | San Francisco 49ers | West | 12 | 5 | 0 | .706 | 4–2 | 9–3 | .498 | .417 | L1 |
| 7 | Green Bay Packers | North | 9 | 7 | 1 | .559 | 4–2 | 7–4–1 | .483 | .431 | L4 |
**Did not qualify for the postseason**
| 8 (Note: Minnesota finished ahead of Detroit based on head-to-head sweep.) | Minnesota Vikings | North | 9 | 8 | 0 | .529 | 4–2 | 7–5 | .514 | .431 | W5 |
| 9 | Detroit Lions | North | 9 | 8 | 0 | .529 | 2–4 | 6–6 | .490 | .428 | W1 |
| 10 (Note: Tampa Bay finished ahead of Atlanta based on common games (Tampa Bay 6–6 to Atlanta 5–7 against: Arizona, Buffalo, Carolina, LA Rams, Miami, New England, New Orleans, NY Jets, San Francisco and Seattle).) | Tampa Bay Buccaneers | South | 8 | 9 | 0 | .471 | 3–3 | 6–6 | .529 | .485 | W1 |
| 11 | Atlanta Falcons | South | 8 | 9 | 0 | .471 | 3–3 | 7–5 | .495 | .449 | W4 |
| 12 | Dallas Cowboys | East | 7 | 9 | 1 | .441 | 4–2 | 4–7–1 | .438 | .311 | L1 |
| 13 | New Orleans Saints | South | 6 | 11 | 0 | .353 | 3–3 | 4–8 | .495 | .333 | L1 |
| 14 | Washington Commanders | East | 5 | 12 | 0 | .294 | 3–3 | 3–9 | .507 | .388 | W1 |
| 15 | New York Giants | East | 4 | 13 | 0 | .235 | 2–4 | 2–10 | .524 | .478 | W2 |
| 16 | Arizona Cardinals | West | 3 | 14 | 0 | .176 | 0–6 | 3–9 | .571 | .422 | L9 |
**Tiebreakers** (Note: When breaking ties for three or more teams under the NFL's rules, they are first broken within divisions, then comparing only the highest ranked remaining team from each division.)

== Postseason ==
=== Schedule ===
| Round | Date | Opponent (seed) | Result | Record | Venue | Sources |
|---|---|---|---|---|---|---|
| Wild Card | January 10 | Los Angeles Rams (5) | L 31–34 | 0–1 | Bank of America Stadium | Recap |

=== Game summaries ===
==== NFC Wild Card Playoffs: vs. (5) Los Angeles Rams ====
NFC Wild Card Playoffs: (5) Los Angeles Rams at (4) Carolina Panthers – Game summary

| Quarter | 1 | 2 | 3 | 4 | Total |
|---|---|---|---|---|---|
| Rams | 7 | 10 | 3 | 14 | 34 |
| Panthers | 0 | 14 | 3 | 14 | 31 |

at Bank of America Stadium, Charlotte, North Carolina

- Date: January 10, 2026
- Game time: 4:35 p.m. EST
- Game weather: Mostly cloudy, 72 °F (22 °C)
- Game attendance: 73,426
- Referee: Clete Blakeman
- TV announcers (Fox): Joe Davis, Greg Olsen, Pam Oliver, and Kristina Pink
- Recap, Game Book

Game information

First quarter

- LAR – Puka Nacua 14-yard pass from Matthew Stafford (Harrison Mevis kick), 11:35. Rams 7–0. Drive: 4 plays, 45 yards, 1:51.

Second quarter

- LAR – Puka Nacua 5-yard run (Harrison Mevis kick), 12:16. Rams 14–0. Drive: 7 plays, 48 yards, 4:01.
- CAR – Chuba Hubbard 1-yard run (Ryan Fitzgerald kick), 8:53. Rams 14–7. Drive: 7 plays, 65 yards, 3:23.
- LAR – Harrison Mevis 46-yard field goal, 5:24. Rams 17–7. Drive: 6 plays, 37 yards, 3:29.
- CAR – Bryce Young 16-yard run (Ryan Fitzgerald kick), 0:37. Rams 17–14. Drive: 5 plays, 81 yards, 0:54.

Third quarter

- CAR – Ryan Fitzgerald 46-yard field goal, 7:29. Tied 17–17. Drive: 13 plays, 59 yards, 7:08.
- LAR – Harrison Mevis 42-yard field goal, 4:17. Rams 20–17. Drive: 9 plays, 46 yards, 3:12.

Fourth quarter

- CAR – Chuba Hubbard 3-yard run (Ryan Fitzgerald kick), 14:34. Panthers 24–20. Drive: 4 plays, 62 yards, 1:40.
- LAR – Kyren Williams 13-yard pass from Matthew Stafford (Harrison Mevis kick), 8:47. Rams 27–24. Drive: 11 plays, 67 yards, 5:47.
- CAR – Jalen Coker 7-yard pass from Bryce Young (Ryan Fitzgerald kick), 2:39. Panthers 31–27. Drive: 4 plays, 30 yards, 1:33.
- LAR – Colby Parkinson 19-yard pass from Matthew Stafford (Harrison Mevis kick), 0:38. Rams 34–31. Drive: 7 plays, 71 yards, 2:01.

Top passers

- LAR – Matthew Stafford – 24/42, 304 yards, 3 TD, INT
- CAR – Bryce Young – 21/39, 264 yards, TD, INT

Top rushers

- LAR – Kyren Williams – 13 rushes, 57 yards
- CAR – Chuba Hubbard – 13 rushes, 46 yards, 2 TD

Top receivers

- LAR – Puka Nacua – 10 receptions, 111 yards, TD
- CAR – Jalen Coker – 9 receptions, 134 yards, TD

It was a rough start for Carolina, but they managed to go into halftime down only 14–17. In the third quarter, Carolina tied it with a field goal. LA reclaimed the lead with a field goal. In Carolina’s next possession they turned the ball over on the fourth down. Cornerback Mike Jackson intercepted a Matthew Stafford pass, and Carolina scored with a Chuba Hubbard touchdown, taking the lead. L.A. took it back with a Kyren Williams touchdown. Jalen Coker scored for Carolina. With 38 seconds to go LA answered with a touchdown. The Rams won 34–31, ending the Panthers' season. This marked the Panthers first playoff loss at home since 2013.
