= Will Harriger =

American football coach (born 1982)

Carolina Panthers
- Title: Quarterbacks coach

Personal information
- Born: June 20, 1982 (age 44)

Career information
- High school: Trinity Christian High (TX)
- College: Auburn

Career history
- Midwestern State (2004–2005) Graduate assistant; Tennessee–Martin (2006) Graduate assistant; Auburn (2007) Defensive administrative assistant; Texas (2008) Defensive quality control assistant; UT Martin (2009) Linebackers coach; Texas Tech (2010-2011); Defensive staff assistant/Interim linebackers coach (2010); Graduate assistant (2011); Florida (2012–2013) Graduate assistant; Seattle Seahawks (2014–2018); Offensive assistant (2014-2015); Assistant quarterbacks coach (2016-2018); Atlanta Falcons (2019-2020); Offensive assistant (2019); Game management coordinator/Running backs coach (2020); Jacksonville Jaguars (2021) Offensive assistant; USC (2022) Senior offensive analyst/Assistant quarterbacks/Game management coordinator/NFL liaison; Dallas Cowboys (2023) Offensive assistant/Quality control coach; Carolina Panthers (2024–present) Quarterbacks coach

Will Harriger (born June 20, 1982) is an American football coach who is the quarterbacks coach for the Carolina Panthers of the National Football League (NFL).

== Coaching career ==
=== Midwestern State ===
Harriger began his coaching career as a graduate assistant at Midwestern State in 2004 and 2005. He worked with the outside linebackers. During his time at Midwestern State, the Broncos were named the Lone Star Conference co-champion in 2004, and reached the NCAA Division II playoffs for the first time in school history.

=== UT Martin ===
In 2006, Harriger joined the coaching staff at the University of Tennessee–Martin as a graduate assistant.

=== Auburn ===
Harriger returned to his alma mater, Auburn, the following year to serve as a defensive administrative assistant.

=== Texas ===
In 2008, he was a defensive quality control assistant at Texas, working with the linebackers.

=== UT Martin (second stint) ===
In 2009, Harriger returned to UT Martin as a linebackers coach. That year, linebacker Josh Bey made the All-Ohio Valley first team.

=== Texas Tech ===
He then spent 2 seasons at Texas Tech. He started as a defensive staff assistant, and as interim linebackers coach in the 2011 TicketCity Bowl and the second as a defensive graduate assistant working with the inside linebackers.

=== Florida ===
Harriger then took a job as a graduate assistant at Florida.

=== Seattle Seahawks ===
In 2014, Harriger took a job with the Seattle Seahawks and shifted to coaching offense. In 2016, he was promoted to assistant quarterbacks coach. In Seattle, he would work with future Carolina Panthers head coach Dave Canales.

=== Atlanta Falcons ===
Harriger was hired by the Atlanta Falcons in 2019, serving as an offensive assistant. He then moved to game management coordinator in 2020, before transitioning to running backs coach for the season’s final 12 weeks.

=== Jacksonville Jaguars ===
He was then hired by the Jacksonville Jaguars during the 2021 season.

=== USC ===
In 2022, Harriger was hired by USC. Throughout the season he served in many different roles including, senior offensive analyst, assistant quarterbacks coach, game management coordinator, and NFL liaison. During his tenure, USC quarterback Caleb Williams won the Heisman Trophy.

=== Dallas Cowboys ===
In 2023, Harriger returned to the NFL, serving as an offensive assistant and quality control coach for the Dallas Cowboys.

=== Carolina Panthers ===
In 2024, the Carolina Panthers hired Harriger as quarterbacks coach. He was hired to assist in the development of second-year quarterback Bryce Young, whom Harriger had previously worked with via the QB Collective during Young's high school days.

== Personal life ==
Harriger and his wife, Brooke, have two children. He earned his bachelor’s degree in communications from Auburn in 2004.

Outside of the NFL, Harriger worked with QB Collective helping to develop high school quarterbacks.
