= Dave Canales =

American football coach (born 1981)

Carolina Panthers
- Title: Head coach

Personal information
- Born: May 7, 1981 (age 45); Harbor City, California, U.S.
- Listed height: 6 ft 1 in (1.85 m)
- Listed weight: 200 lb (91 kg)

Career information
- Position: Wide receiver
- High school: Carson (Carson, California)
- College: Azusa Pacific (1999–2003)

Career history
- Carson HS (2004–2005) Freshman/sophomore head coach & offensive coordinator; El Camino (2006–2008) Special teams coordinator, tight ends & quarterbacks coach; USC (2009) Assistant strength coach; Seattle Seahawks (2010–2022); Offensive quality control coach (2010–2012); Assistant quarterbacks coach (2013–2014); Wide receivers coach (2015–2017); Quarterbacks coach (2018–2019); Passing game coordinator (2020–2021); Quarterbacks coach (2022); Tampa Bay Buccaneers (2023) Offensive coordinator; Carolina Panthers (2024–present) Head coach

Awards and highlights
- Super Bowl champion (XLVIII)

Head coaching record
- Regular season: 17–26 (.395)
- Postseason: 0–1 (.000)
- Career: 17–27 (.386)
- Coaching profile at Pro Football Reference

David Aaron Canales (born May 7, 1981) is an American football coach who is the head coach of the Carolina Panthers of the National Football League (NFL). He played college football at Azusa Pacific.

Canales began his coaching career at Carson High School in California before working at El Camino College and USC. He joined the Seattle Seahawks in 2010 and spent 13 seasons on Pete Carroll's staff, serving in several offensive coaching roles and winning Super Bowl XLVIII. He was the Tampa Bay Buccaneers' offensive coordinator in 2023 before becoming the Panthers' head coach in 2024.

In his second season with Carolina, Canales led the Panthers to the NFC South championship and their first playoff appearance since the 2017 season.

== Early life and education ==
Born in Harbor City, California, on May 7, 1981, Canales is the son of Ritha and Isaac Canales. His father is of Mexican descent. Dave and his brothers, Josh and Coba were born in Harbor City, while his father was a pastor at Mission Ebenezer Family Church in Carson, California. Canales attended Carson High School in Carson, graduating in 1999. As a junior in 1997, Canales played defensive back and was named first-team All-Southern Pacific League. The following year he switched to quarterback, where he again was named first-team All-Southern Pacific League. He also participated in track and field and baseball.

== College career ==
In February 1999, Canales committed to play football for Pete Shinnick's Azusa Pacific Cougars football team, then a NAIA program. He made the transition to wide receiver. As a 1999 true freshman he appeared in 7 games. He made just a single catch on the season, a 45-yarder against the Chapman Panthers. The Cougars would advance to the NAIA Semifinals, where they lost to the Georgetown Tigers. As a sophomore in 2000, Canales played in 7 games, missing four games due to injury. He had 7 receptions for 40 yards. Canales had his best game of the season against San Diego, recording four receptions for 24 yards.

As a junior, he redshirted due to an injury that kept him from playing the entire season. He returned in the 2002 season, appearing in one game as a reserve but did not make a reception. Canales posted his best numbers as a senior in 2003, with 19 receptions for 208 yards and a touchdown. As a senior in 2003, he helped Azusa Pacific to the NAIA Playoffs, finishing in ninth place.

In his college career, Canales recorded 27 receptions for 293 yards and one touchdown. He earned a Bachelor of Arts with a major in business administration from the Azusa Pacific University in 2003.

=== College statistics ===
| Year | Team | Receiving | | | | |
| Year | Team | Rec | Yards | Avg | Yds/G | TD |
|---|---|---|---|---|---|---|
| 1999 | Azusa Pacific | 1 | 45 | 45.0 | 6.4 | 0 |
| 2000 | Azusa Pacific | 7 | 40 | 5.7 | 5.7 | 0 |
| 2001 | Azusa Pacific | Injured | | | | |
| 2002 | Azusa Pacific | 0 | 0 | – | – | 0 |
| 2003 | Azusa Pacific | 19 | 208 | 10.9 | 20.8 | 1 |
| Career | | 27 | 293 | 10.9 | 12.2 | 1 |

== Coaching career ==
=== Carson High School ===
Canales began his coaching career serving as the head coach and offensive coordinator of the freshman/sophomore team at his alma mater, Carson High School, from 2004 to 2005.

=== El Camino College ===
From 2006 to 2008, Canales coached at El Camino College, working with tight ends, special teams, and quarterbacks. During his tenure, the school won the California Community College State Championship in 2006 and also secured two Mission Conference titles.

=== USC ===
During his time at El Camino College, Canales formed a relationship with Pete Carroll, the head coach of the USC Trojans. In 2009, Canales joined Carroll at USC, where he served as an assistant strength coach for one season.

=== Seattle Seahawks ===
Canales joined the Seattle Seahawks as an offensive quality control coach in 2010, following Pete Carroll from USC. He became assistant quarterbacks coach in 2013. He was a member of the Seahawks' coaching staff when the team won Super Bowl XLVIII following the 2013 season.

In 2015, Canales was promoted to wide receivers coach, succeeding Kippy Brown, and held the position through 2017. He served as quarterbacks coach in 2018 and 2019, passing game coordinator in 2020 and 2021, and quarterbacks coach again in 2022.

Canales spent 13 years with the Seahawks, serving in a variety of capacities on the offensive side of the staff. He was credited with assisting in the resurgence of quarterback Geno Smith's career. In the 2022 season, Smith was highly effective as the team's starting quarterback and was named NFL Comeback Player of the Year, while also earning his first Pro Bowl appearance.

=== Tampa Bay Buccaneers ===
On February 16, 2023, Canales was hired by the Tampa Bay Buccaneers as their offensive coordinator under head coach Todd Bowles, replacing Byron Leftwich. In Canales' lone season as the Buccaneers offensive coordinator, the Buccaneers were 23rd in the NFL in yards per game and 20th in points scored. Buccaneers quarterback Baker Mayfield ended the season with 28 touchdown passes, 4,044 passing yards and a 64.3% completion rate, all career highs. He earned his first Pro Bowl nomination. The Buccaneers reached the Divisional Round where they lost to the Detroit Lions, 31–23.

=== Carolina Panthers ===
==== 2024 season ====
On January 25, 2024, Canales signed a six-year contract to become the head coach of the Carolina Panthers. He succeeded Chris Tabor, who was interim head coach for only the last six games of the preceding season after succeeding the fired Frank Reich. Prior to Canales's arrival, the Panthers had not had a winning season nor a playoff appearance since 2017.

The Panthers were expected to struggle in what was anticipated to be a rebuilding season, with a new scheme and many new players as well as Bryce Young needing to further his development to prevent him from reaching bust status, Canales led the team to a 5–12 record in the regular season, finishing 3rd in the NFC South division.

On September 22, Canales got his first win as a head coach in Week 3 against the Las Vegas Raiders. This came after a move that was thought by many to be the end of Young's tenure in Carolina, as he was benched in favor of veteran Andy Dalton. Following Dalton's 4-game losing streak, and an thumb injury in a car accident, Young was elevated to starter again. Performing well enough to hold onto his position the rest of the season.

Canales's work in Carolina had resulted in a successful building season, revitalizing the career of quarterback Bryce Young and with offensive coordinator Brad Idzik improving the team's offensive output by a full 6 points per game from the previous season. The Panthers season ended with a 44–38 win in overtime over the Atlanta Falcons, their best offensive output of the season, and earning the praise of owner David Tepper.

==== 2025 season ====
Canales led the team to an 8–9 record in the regular season, winning the NFC South title and made the playoffs for the first time since the 2017 season. The division title came about in a unique way, with the Atlanta Falcons win over the New Orleans Saints in Week 18. In the Panthers' first playoff appearance in eight years, they lost by a score of 31–34 to the Los Angeles Rams, surrendering a 4 point lead with 38 seconds remaining. Following the game, Canales said, "As we all know, in this league, there are no moral victories. Today is not about losing this opportunity, but it’s about a team that came together to play really good football and to battle." The season left many to believe that the Panthers would continue to build on their success the next season.

== Head coaching record ==
| Team | Year | Regular season | | | | | Postseason | | | |
| Team | Year | Won | Lost | Ties | Win % | Finish | Won | Lost | Win % | Result |
|---|---|---|---|---|---|---|---|---|---|---|
| CAR | 2024 | 5 | 12 | 0 | .294 | 3rd in NFC South | — | — | — | — |
| CAR | 2025 | 8 | 9 | 0 | .471 | 1st in NFC South | 0 | 1 | .000 | Lost to Los Angeles Rams in NFC Wild Card Game |
| CAR | 2026 | 4 | 5 | 0 | .375 | TBD in NFC South | — | — | — | — |
| Total | | 17 | 26 | 0 | .381 | | 0 | 1 | .000 | |

== Personal life ==
Canales is married to Lizzy Canales, whom he met while attending Azusa Pacific University. They have four children.
