= Rico Dowdle =

American football player (born 1998)

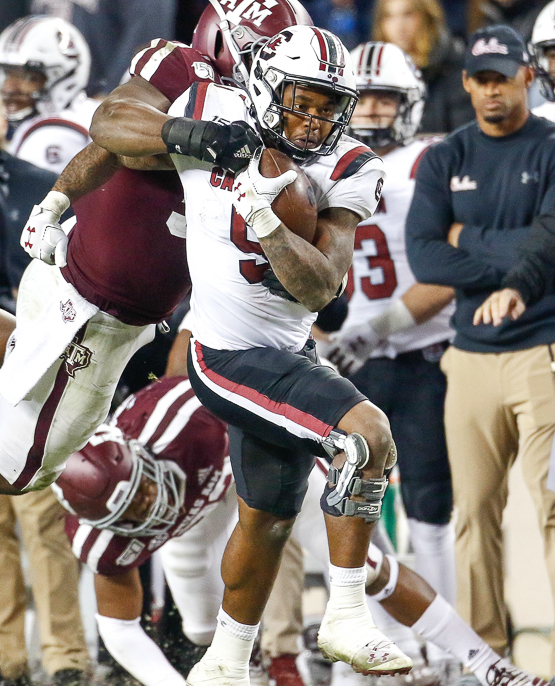
- Dowdle with the South Carolina Gamecocks in 2019

No. 13 – Pittsburgh Steelers
- Positions: Running back, kickoff returner
- Roster status: Active

Personal information
- Born: June 14, 1998 (age 28); Gaffney, South Carolina, U.S.
- Listed height: 5 ft 11 in (1.80 m)
- Listed weight: 218 lb (99 kg)

Career information
- High school: A. C. Reynolds (Asheville, North Carolina)
- College: South Carolina (2016–2019)
- NFL draft: 2020: undrafted

Career history
- Dallas Cowboys (2020–2024); Carolina Panthers (2025); Pittsburgh Steelers (2026–present)

Career NFL statistics as of Week 10, 2026
- Rushing yards: 2,740
- Rushing average: 4.4
- Rushing touchdowns: 11
- Receptions: 110
- Receiving yards: 780
- Receiving touchdowns: 6
- Return yards: 435
- Stats at Pro Football Reference

Rico Sharod Dowdle Jr. (born June 14, 1998) is an American professional football running back and kickoff returner for the Pittsburgh Steelers of the National Football League (NFL). He played college football for the South Carolina Gamecocks.

== Early life ==
Dowdle was born on June 14, 1998 in Gaffney, South Carolina. Dowdle attended A. C. Reynolds High School in Asheville, North Carolina. As a senior, he was switched from running back to quarterback, leading the team to an 11-2 overall record and 6-0 in their conference. He had 247 carries for 2,545 yards and 51 rushing touchdowns. He also passed for 1,434 yards, 11 touchdowns, 4 interceptions and had a 55-yard touchdown reception. His 63 total touchdowns was a WNC single-season record. He received All-WNC Player of the Year, Parade All-American and All-state honors.

He was a three-star recruit coming out of high school and committed to play football at the University of South Carolina.

== College career ==
As a freshman, he had offseason surgery to recover from a sports hernia and was forced to miss the first 4 contests. He appeared in 9 games with 7 starts. He led the team with 133 carries for 764 yards (5.7-yard avg.) and 6 rushing touchdowns. He also had 15 receptions for 55 yards and one receiving touchdown. He had 27 carries for 149 yards, one rushing touchdown, 3 receptions for 20 yards and one receiving touchdown against the University of Missouri. He made 21 carries for 226 yards (sixth in school history) and 2 rushing touchdowns against Western Carolina University.

As a sophomore, he was named the starter at running back and appeared in 8 games with 4 starts. He registered 66 carries for 251 yards, 2 rushing touchdowns, 11 receptions for 128 yards and one receiving touchdown. He broke his leg in the seventh game against the University of Tennessee and was forced to miss the final five contests of the regular season. He returned to play in the 2018 Outback Bowl, collecting 6 carries for 45 yards, one rushing touchdown and 3 receptions for 32 yards.

As a junior, he appeared in 12 games, leading the team with 123 carries for 654 yards and 4 rushing touchdowns. He also had 14 receptions for 133 yards and one receiving touchdown. He suffered a left ankle injury in the first carry against the University of Mississippi and did not return. He was limited in the next 2 contests. He had 20 carries for 112 yards and one touchdown against Vanderbilt University. He made 14 carries for 140 yards and one touchdown against the University of Tennessee.

As a senior, he was limited in the off season with a groin injury. He was part of a platoon at the running back position with Tavien Feaster. He rushed at nearly six yards per attempt during the first 6 contests of the season, until suffering a right knee injury against the University of Florida, which forced him to miss the next 2 contests. He was second on the team with 108 carries for 498 yards and 4 rushing touchdowns.

Dowdle finished 15th on the school's All-time rushing list, totaling 2,167 rushing yards and 16 touchdowns in 39 games. He compiled eight 100-yard rushing games, including a career-best 226-yard contest. Dowdle played in the 2020 East-West Shrine Bowl, rushing for fifty yards.

== Professional career ==
Pre-draft measurables
Height	Weight	Arm length	Hand span	Wingspan	40-yard dash	10-yard split	20-yard split	Vertical jump	Broad jump
5 ft 11 1/4 in (1.81 m)	213 lb (97 kg)	31 3/8 in (0.80 m)	9 1/2 in (0.24 m)	6 ft 3 5/8 in (1.92 m)	4.54 s	1.53 s	2.68 s	38.0 in (0.97 m)	10 ft 7 in (3.23 m)
All values from NFL Combine

=== Dallas Cowboys ===
==== 2020 season ====
Dowdle was signed as an undrafted free agent by the Dallas Cowboys after the 2020 NFL draft on April 27. He was one of ten rookies to make the Cowboys final roster, as the third string running back behind Ezekiel Elliott and Tony Pollard. He appeared in 15 games, tallying 4 kickoff returns for 152 yards (38-yard avg.), 3 special teams tackles and 7 carries for 24 yards.

==== 2021 season ====
In 2021, he suffered a hip injury in the third preseason game against the Houston Texans. On August 25, Dowdle was placed on injured reserve.

==== 2022 season ====
In 2022, he was the third-string running back behind Ezekiel Elliott and Tony Pollard, appearing in 5 games playing on special teams, before suffering an ankle injury. On October 15, Dowdle was placed on injured reserve. He did not record any offensive stat and had one special teams tackle.

==== 2023 season ====
In 2023, after Elliott was released, he became the backup running back behind Pollard. In Week 11, Dowdle rushed 12 times for 79 yards and a touchdown during a win over the New York Giants. In Week 17, he missed the game against the Detroit Lions with an ankle injury. He appeared in 16 games, registering 89 carries for 361 yards, 17 receptions for 144 yards and four touchdowns.

==== 2024 season ====
On March 18, 2024, Dowdle signed a one-year contract with the Cowboys. After battling through multiple injuries in his first four years in the league, he took advantage of Tony Pollard's departure in free agency and earned the backup running back position behind Ezekiel Elliott.

In Week 8 against the San Francisco 49ers, he sat out with an illness and was replaced with Dalvin Cook. Dowdle would emerge as the team's lead back in Week 9 against the Atlanta Falcons, when he had 12 carries for 75 yards in the 21-27 loss, while taking over for a suspended Elliott. In Week 15 against the Carolina Panthers, he posted 25 carries for 149 yards.

In Week 17 against the Philadelphia Eagles, he had 23 carries for 104 yards, making history in the 41-7 loss, becoming the first undrafted free agent to rush for 1,000 yards in a season in team history. In the same contest, Saquon Barkley became just the ninth player in NFL history to reach 2,000 rushing yards in a single-season.

He rushed for over 100 yards in four of the Cowboys' last 6 games. He set career highs with 235 carries for 1,079 yards (4.6-yard avg.), 2 rushing touchdowns, 39 receptions for 249 yards and 3 receiving touchdowns. He was not re-signed after the season.

=== Carolina Panthers ===
On March 12, 2025, Dowdle signed a one-year, $6.25 million contract with the Carolina Panthers, to be the backup behind Chuba Hubbard and replace Miles Sanders.

Following an injury to Hubbard, Dowdle was named the starter in Week 5. On October 5, 2025, Dowdle rushed for a career-high 206 yards and scored a touchdown in the Panthers' 27–24 Week 5 comeback win over the Miami Dolphins. Dowdle also had a career-high in rushing yards-per-attempt with 9 yards per carry. Dowdle fell 4 yards short of the Panthers' single-game franchise rushing yards record, set by DeAngelo Williams in 2012 with 210 yards. On October 12, in the Panthers' 30-27 Week 6 win against his former team, the Dallas Cowboys, Dowdle rushed for 186 yards. He became the first player since Le'Veon Bell in 2014 to have at least 230 scrimmage yards in back-to-back games. Following Hubbard's return, Dowdle maintained his starter role for the remainder of the season.

Dowdle finished the 2025 season as the Panthers' leading rusher with 1,076 rushing yards and six touchdowns, along with 39 catches for 297 yards and one touchdown through 17 games (including 11 starts).

=== Pittsburgh Steelers ===
On March 13, 2026, Dowdle signed a two-year, $12.25 million contract with the Pittsburgh Steelers.

== Career statistics ==
=== NFL ===
Legend
**Bold**	Career high

==== Regular season ====
Year	Team	Games		Rushing					Receiving					Kickoff return					Fumbles	
Year	Team	GP	GS	Att	Yds	Avg	Lng	TD	Rec	Yds	Avg	Lng	TD	Ret	Yds	Avg	Lng	TD	Fum	Lost
2020	DAL	15	0	7	24	3.4	7	0	0	0	–	0	0	4	152	**38.0**	**64**	0	0	0
2021	DAL	Did not play due to injury																		
2022	DAL	5	0	0	0	–	0	0	0	0	–	0	0	0	0	–	0	0	0	0
2023	DAL	**16**	0	89	361	4.1	21	2	17	144	8.5	32	2	6	86	14.3	31	0	0	0
2024	DAL	**16**	**15**	235	**1,079**	**4.6**	27	2	**39**	249	6.4	22	**3**	0	0	–	0	0	**3**	**2**
2025	CAR	17	11	**236**	1,076	**4.6**	**53**	**6**	**39**	**297**	**7.6**	**36**	1	**8**	**197**	24.6	30	0	2	1
2026	PIT	6	1	51	200	3.9	16	1	15	90	6.0	13	0	0	0	0.0	0	0	1	0
Career		75	27	618	2,740	4.4	53	11	110	780	7.1	36	6	18	435	24.2	64	0	6	3

==== Postseason ====
Year	Team	Games		Rushing					Receiving					Kickoff return					Fumbles	
Year	Team	GP	GS	Att	Yds	Avg	Lng	TD	Rec	Yds	Avg	Lng	TD	Ret	Yds	Avg	Lng	TD	Fum	Lost
2021	DAL	Did not play due to injury																		
2022	DAL	Did not play due to injury																		
2023	DAL	1	0	2	**11**	**5.5**	**9**	0	**2**	**14**	**7.0**	**10**	0	0	0	–	0	0	0	0
2025	CAR	1	1	**5**	9	1.8	8	0	1	6	6.0	6	0	0	0	0	0	0	0	0
Career		2	1	7	20	2.9	9	0	3	20	6.7	10	0	0	0	0	0	0	0	0

=== College ===
		Rushing					Receiving			
Season	Team	GP	Att	Yds	Avg	TD	Rec	Yds	Avg	TD
2016	South Carolina	9	**133**	**764**	**5.7**	**6**	15	55	3.7	**1**
2017	South Carolina	8	66	251	3.8	2	11	128	**11.6**	**1**
2018	South Carolina	**12**	123	654	5.3	4	14	133	9.5	**1**
2019	South Carolina	10	106	498	4.7	4	**22**	**167**	7.6	0
Totals		39	428	2,167	4.9	16	62	483	8.1	3
