= Bam Martin-Scott =

American football player (born 2000)

No. 54 – Carolina Panthers
- Position: Linebacker
- Roster status: Active

Personal information
- Born: July 4, 2000 (age 26); Fort Wayne, Indiana, U.S.
- Listed height: 6 ft 2 in (1.88 m)
- Listed weight: 235 lb (107 kg)

Career information
- High school: FW Snider (Fort Wayne, Indiana)
- College: Dodge City (2019–2020); South Carolina (2021–2024)
- NFL draft: 2025: undrafted

Career history
- Carolina Panthers (2025–present)

Career NFL statistics as of 2025
- Total tackles: 21
- Forced fumbles: 1
- Stats at Pro Football Reference

Tavareon M. "Bam" Martin-Scott (born July 4, 2000) is an American professional football linebacker for the Carolina Panthers of the National Football League (NFL). He played college football for the Dodge City Conquistadors and South Carolina Gamecocks.

== Early life ==
Coming out of high school, Martin-Scott committed to play college football at Dodge City Community College which was a junior college school (JUCO).

== College career ==
=== Dodge City CC ===
As a freshman in 2019, Martin-Scott tallied 42 tackles, three and a half sacks, and an interception for the Conquistadors. He did not appear in any games in 2020 due to the COVID-19 pandemic.

=== South Carolina ===
Martin-Scott committed to play Division I football for the South Carolina Gamecocks. He took a redshirt in 2021, appearing in four games. In week 2 of the 2022 season, Martin-Scott notched his first career interception which he returned 37 yards versus South Carolina State. He finished the 2022 season with 16 tackles, three pass deflections, an interception, and a forced fumble in 13 games for the Gamecocks. In 2023, Martin-Scott appeared in ten games where he made three starts, posting 38 tackles with four being for a loss, and two sacks. In 2024, he totaled 65 tackles, two and a half sacks, two pass deflections, two forced fumbles, and a fumble recovery. After filing an appeal to the NCAA for an extra year of eligibility which was denied, Martin-Scott declared for the 2025 NFL draft.

== Professional career ==
Pre-draft measurables
Height	Weight	Arm length	Hand span	Wingspan	40-yard dash	10-yard split	20-yard split	20-yard shuttle	Three-cone drill	Vertical jump	Broad jump	Bench press
6 ft 2 1/8 in (1.88 m)	231 lb (105 kg)	32 in (0.81 m)	8 3/4 in (0.22 m)	6 ft 7 3/8 in (2.02 m)	4.63 s	1.60 s	2.69 s	4.53 s	7.26 s	33.5 in (0.85 m)	10 ft 2 in (3.10 m)	22 reps
All values from NFL Combine/Pro Day

On May 8, 2025, Martin-Scott signed with the Carolina Panthers as an undrafted free agent after going unselected in the 2025 NFL draft.

On August 30, 2026, Martin-Scott was placed on injured reserve due to a hamstring injury. He was activated on October 24.
