= Bryce Young =

American football player (born 2001)

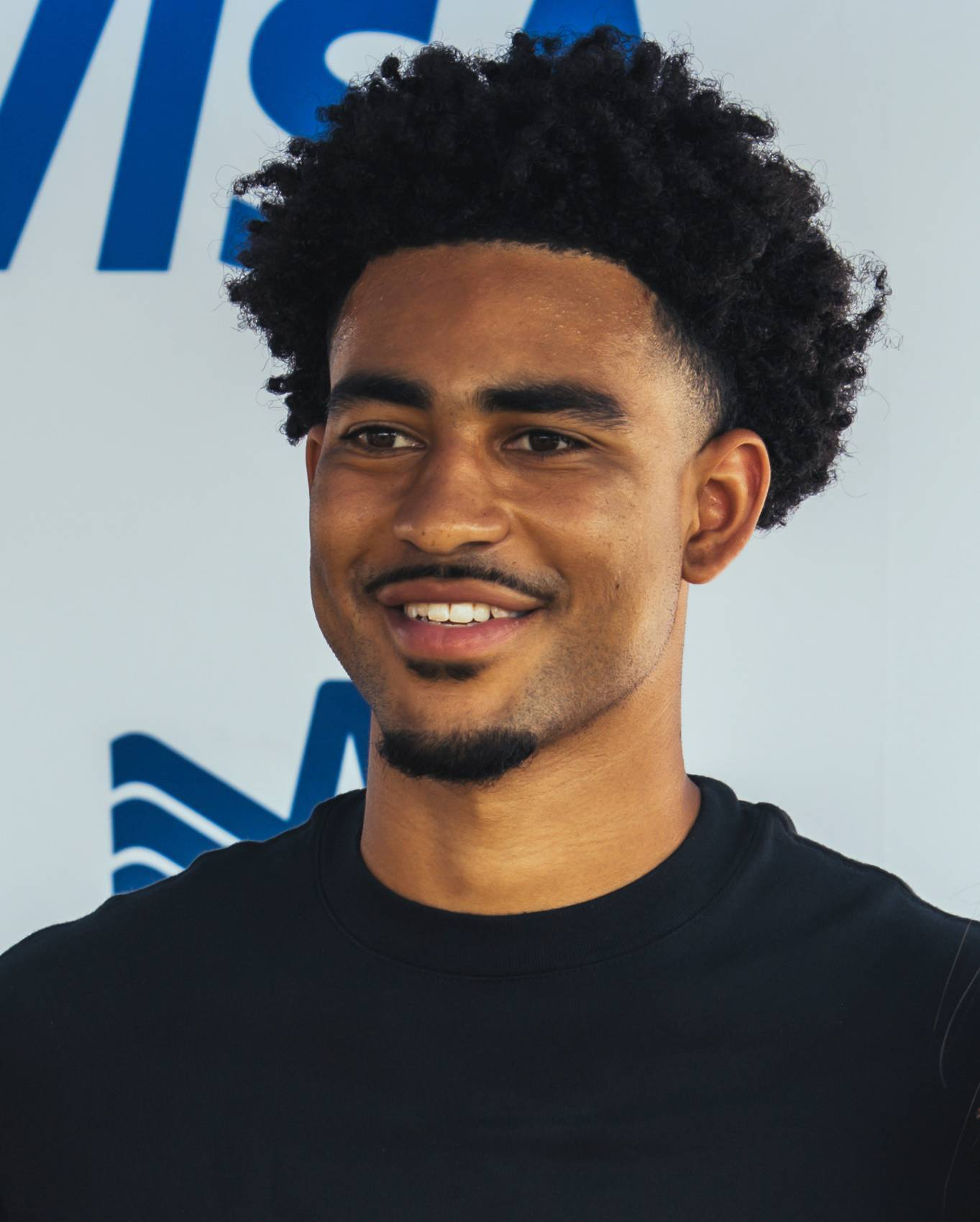
- Young in 2024

No. 9 – Carolina Panthers
- Position: Quarterback
- Roster status: Active

Personal information
- Born: July 25, 2001 (age 25); Wynnewood, Pennsylvania, U.S.
- Listed height: 5 ft 10 in (1.78 m)
- Listed weight: 204 lb (93 kg)

Career information
- High school: Cathedral (Los Angeles, California); Mater Dei (Santa Ana, California)
- College: Alabama (2020–2022)
- NFL draft: 2023: 1st round, 1st overall pick

Career history
- Carolina Panthers (2023–present)

Awards and highlights
- CFP national champion (2020); Heisman Trophy (2021); Consensus All-American (2021); First-team All-SEC (2021); Second-team All-SEC (2022)

Career NFL statistics as of Week 10, 2026
- Passing attempts: 1,727
- Passing completions: 1,056
- Completion percentage: 61.1%
- TD–INT: 65–36
- Passing yards: 10,688
- Passer rating: 82.7
- Rushing yards: 766
- Rushing touchdowns: 9
- Stats at Pro Football Reference

Bryce Christopher Young (born July 25, 2001) is an American professional football quarterback for the Carolina Panthers of the National Football League (NFL). He played college football for the Alabama Crimson Tide, where he set the school single-game passing yards record with 559 yards and won the Heisman Trophy in 2021. Young was selected first overall by the Panthers in the 2023 NFL draft. In the 2025 season, he set the Panthers' single-game passing yards record and helped Carolina win its first NFC South title since 2015.

== Early life ==
Young was born on July 25, 2001, at Lankenau Hospital in Wynnewood, Pennsylvania, near Philadelphia. He grew up mostly in Pasadena, California, and is the only child of Craig Young, a mental health therapist, and Julie Young, a former special education teacher who played college soccer at Cal Poly Pomona. His maternal grandfather was born in Mexico.

Young attended Cathedral High School in Los Angeles before transferring to Mater Dei High School in Santa Ana, California, in 2018. As a senior at Mater Dei, he was named the Los Angeles Times Player of the Year, California's Gatorade Football Player of the Year, and the USA Today High School Offensive Player of the Year after throwing for 4,528 yards and 58 touchdowns. He finished his high school career with 13,250 passing yards and 152 passing touchdowns. A five-star recruit, Young was ranked by the 247Sports Composite as the No. 2 overall prospect and No. 1 dual-threat quarterback in the 2020 class. After initially committing to USC, Young changed his commitment to Alabama in September 2019.

Young became friends with C. J. Stroud while both were high school quarterbacks in Southern California. They were selected first and second overall, respectively, in the 2023 NFL draft.

== College career ==
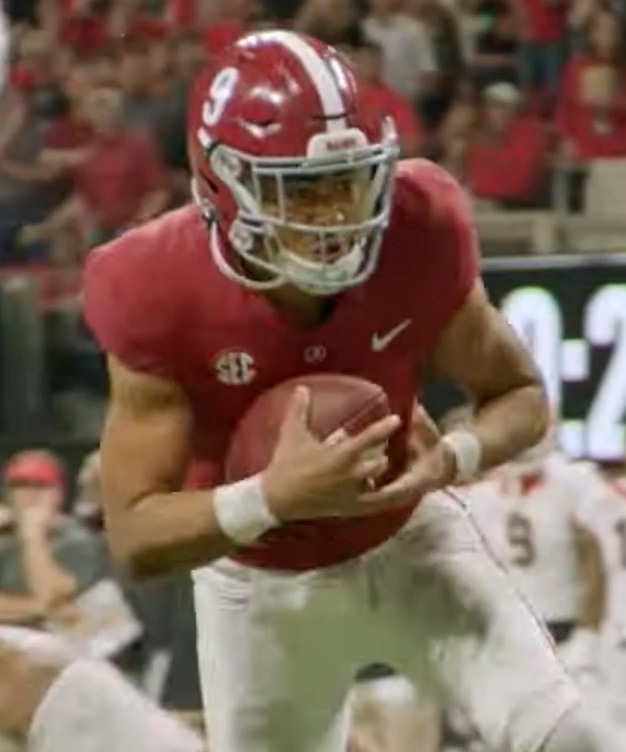
Young with the Alabama Crimson Tide in 2021

=== Freshman year ===
During his freshman year at Alabama, Young was the backup to junior quarterback Mac Jones throughout the 2020 season. On September 26, 2020, Young made his collegiate debut in the late third quarter against Missouri at Faurot Field. That night, Young went 5-of-8 for 54 passing yards with two rushing yards on four attempts. On November 21, he threw his first collegiate touchdown pass in a 63–3 victory over Kentucky. Young appeared in nine games in 2020, finishing the season with 156 passing yards and one touchdown.

=== Sophomore year ===
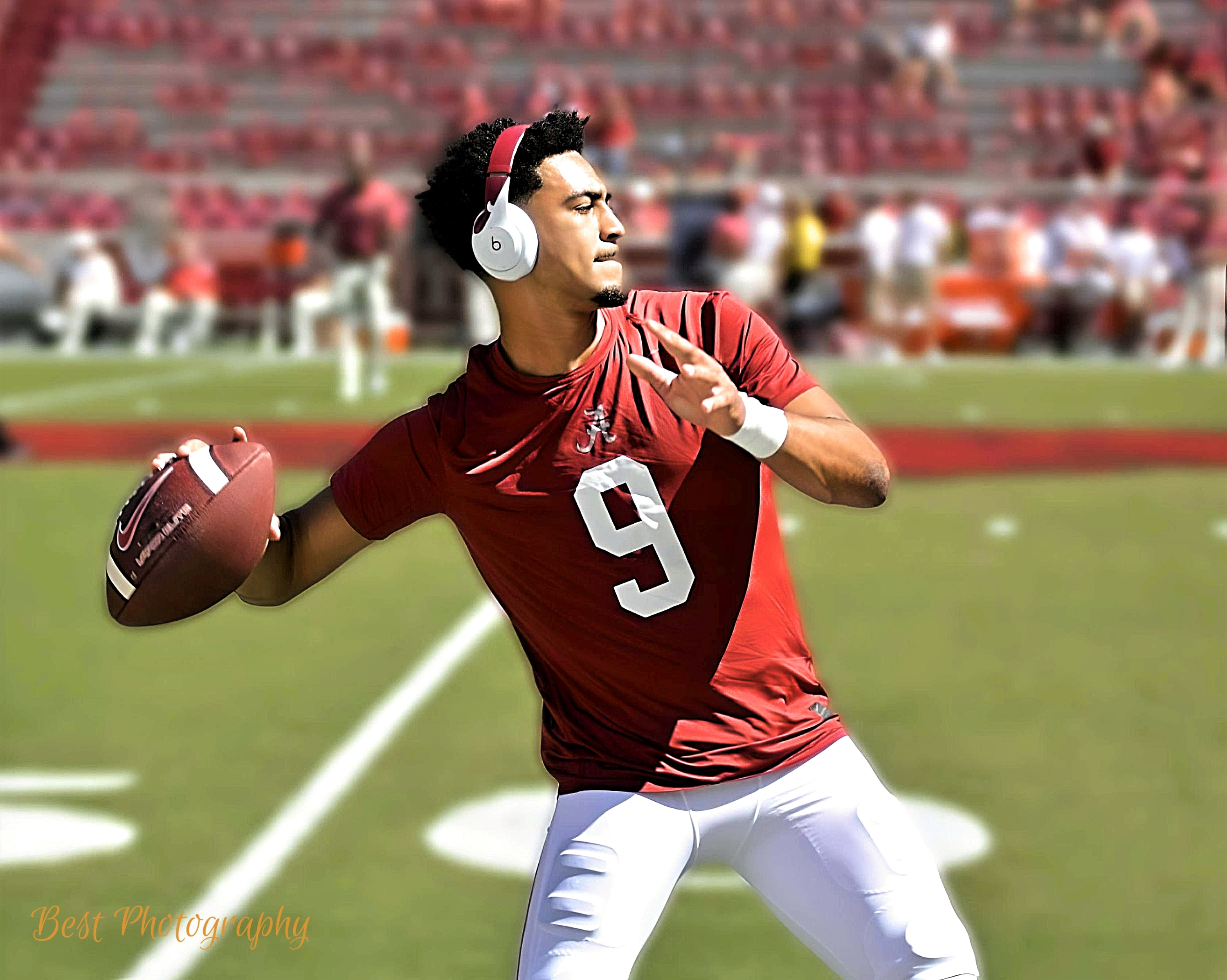
Young warming up before a game with Alabama

On September 4, 2021, Young made his debut as the Crimson Tide's starting quarterback. In a 44–13 win over the #14 Miami Hurricanes, he passed for 344 yards and four touchdowns.

On November 20, against Arkansas, Young threw for 559 yards to break the Alabama school record for passing yards in a game. He had five touchdowns in the 42–35 win. The previous record was held by Scott Hunter.

Young won the Heisman Trophy following the end of the 2021 season, becoming the first Alabama quarterback to win the award. In addition to the Heisman Trophy, Young won AP Player of the Year, the Davey O'Brien Award, the Manning Award, the Maxwell Award, Southeastern Conference (SEC) Offensive Player of the Year, and was a consensus All-American.

Overall, Young passed for 4,872 yards, 47 passing touchdowns, and seven interceptions to go along with three rushing touchdowns in 15 games. He led the SEC in passing yards and passing touchdowns in the 2021 season.

=== Junior year ===
Young started his junior season off strong with 195 passing yards and five passing touchdowns to go along with five carries for 100 rushing yards and one rushing touchdown in the 55–0 victory over Utah State. In his junior year, Young led the Crimson Tide to an 11–2 record, including a 45–20 victory over No. 14 Kansas State in the 2022 Sugar Bowl. He finished in sixth in Heisman Trophy voting. He passed for 3,328 yards, 32 passing touchdowns, and five interceptions to go along with 49 carries for 185 rushing yards and four rushing touchdowns in 12 games. On January 2, 2023, Young announced that he would forgo his senior season and enter the 2023 NFL draft.

== Professional career ==
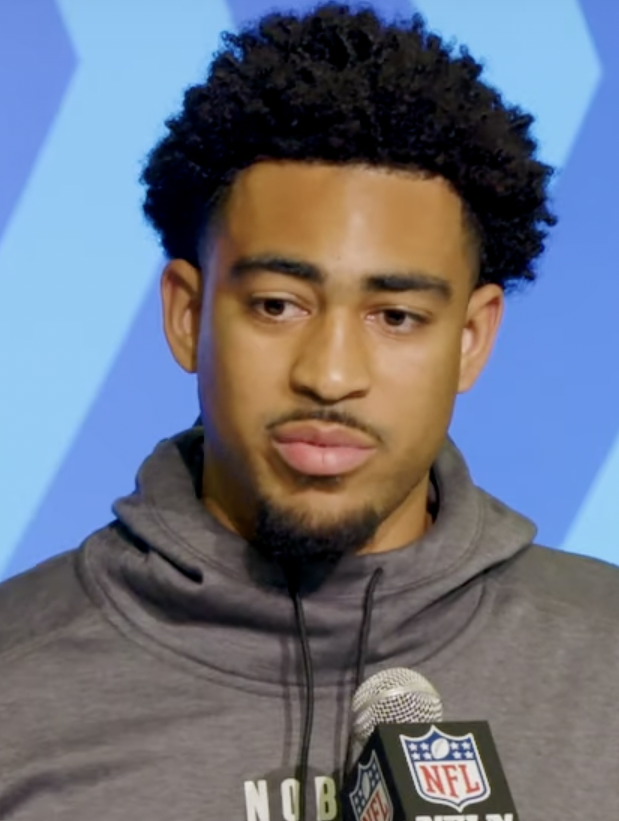
Young at the 2023 NFL Combine

Pre-draft measurables
Height	Weight	Arm length	Hand span	Wingspan
5 ft 10 1/8 in (1.78 m)	204 lb (93 kg)	30 1/2 in (0.77 m)	9 3/4 in (0.25 m)	6 ft 1 1/2 in (1.87 m)
All values from NFL Combine

=== 2023 ===
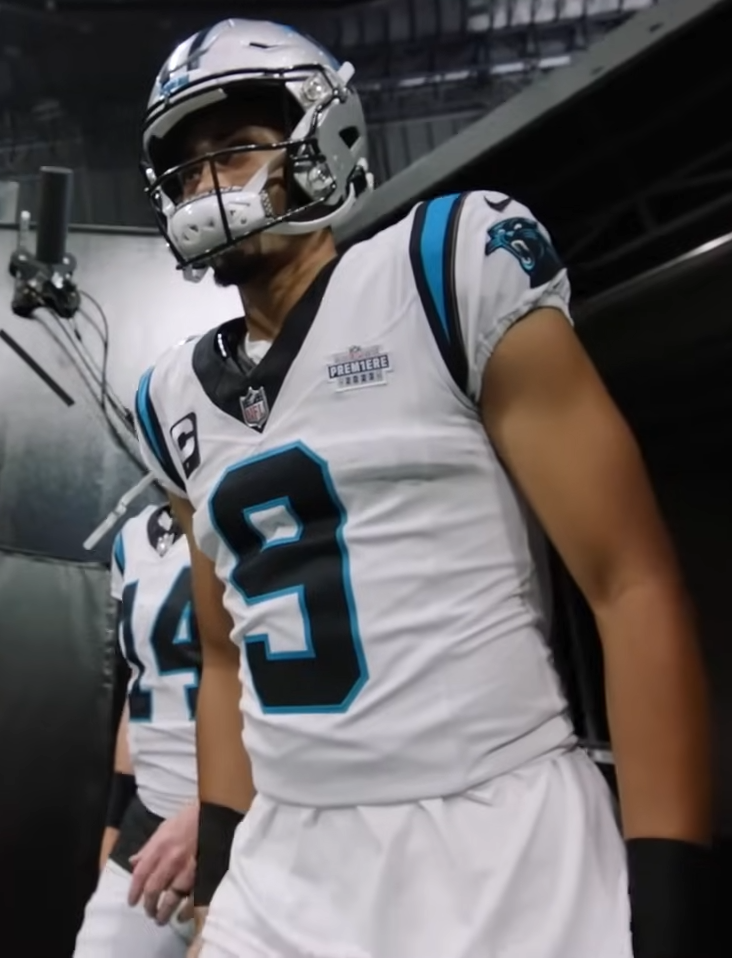
Young with the Panthers during his rookie season in 2023

Young was selected by the Carolina Panthers with the first overall pick in the 2023 NFL draft. The Panthers had acquired the pick from the Chicago Bears in a trade that included the ninth overall pick, wide receiver D. J. Moore, and additional draft selections. He signed a four-year, fully guaranteed rookie contract worth $37.9 million on July 21, 2023.

Young made his NFL debut on September 10, 2023, in a Week 1 loss to the Atlanta Falcons, throwing his first career touchdown pass to Hayden Hurst. He missed Week 3 with an ankle injury. Young recorded his first NFL win on October 29, when Carolina defeated the Houston Texans 15–13. He finished his rookie season with 2,877 passing yards, 11 touchdowns, and 10 interceptions in 16 starts as the Panthers finished 2–15.

=== 2024 ===
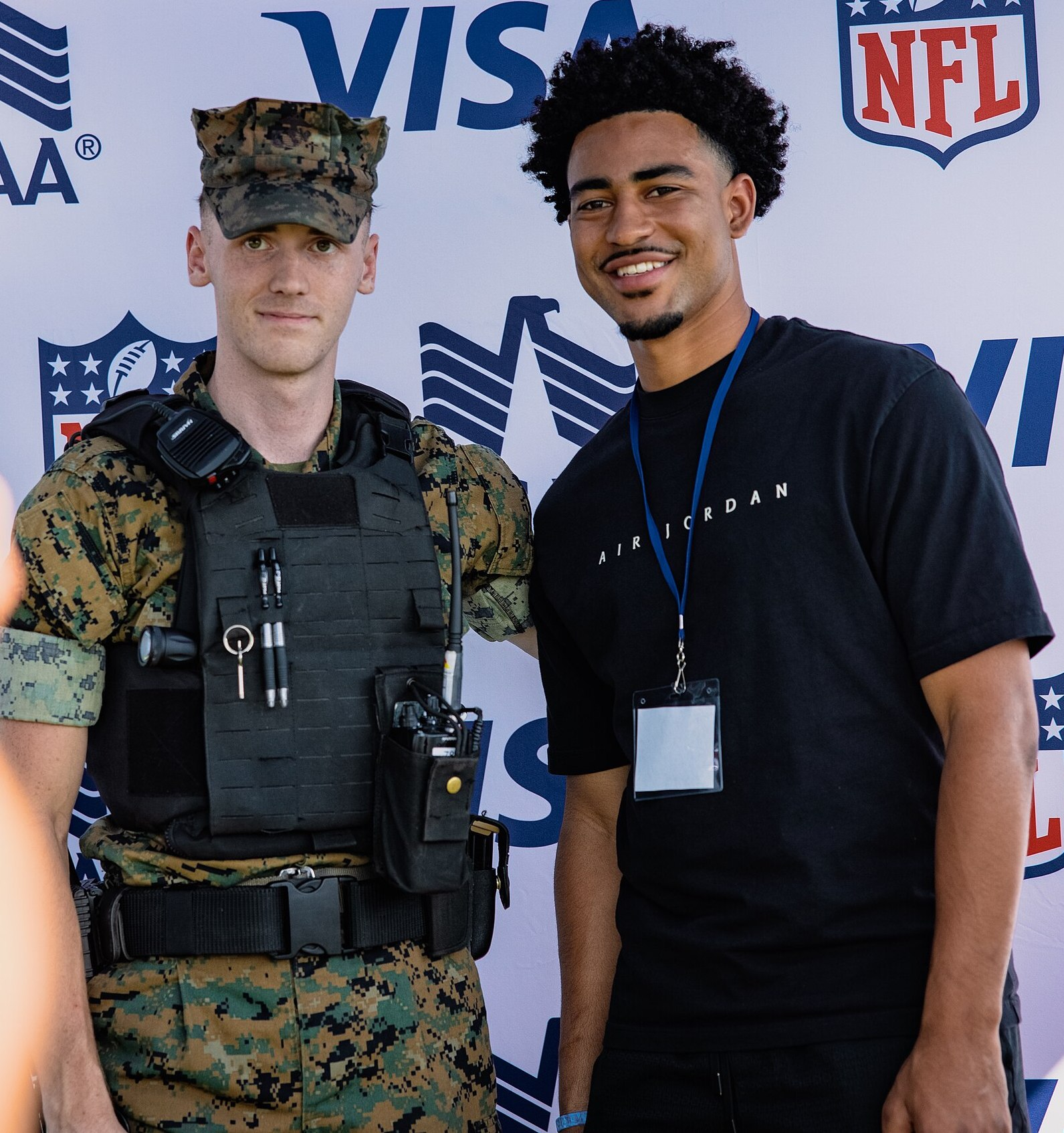
Young in 2024

Young opened the 2024 season as Carolina's starting quarterback but was benched for veteran Andy Dalton after the Panthers lost their first two games by a combined 60 points. He returned to the starting lineup in Week 8 after Dalton sustained a thumb injury in a car accident.

After returning to the lineup, Young helped Carolina defeat the New Orleans Saints and New York Giants in consecutive games, the Panthers' first back-to-back wins since 2022. In the season finale against the Falcons, he passed for three touchdowns and rushed for two more in a 44–38 overtime win. Young finished the season with 2,403 passing yards, 15 passing touchdowns, nine interceptions, and six rushing touchdowns. Following the season, head coach Dave Canales said Young would remain Carolina's starting quarterback entering 2025.

=== 2025 ===
Young started 16 games in 2025, completing 304 of 478 passes for 3,011 yards, 23 touchdowns, and 11 interceptions; his yards, touchdowns, completion percentage, and passer rating were career highs. In Week 11, he passed for 448 yards, three touchdowns, and no interceptions in a 30–27 overtime win over the Atlanta Falcons, breaking Cam Newton's Panthers single-game record of 432 passing yards. The performance earned Young his first NFC Offensive Player of the Week award and the FedEx Air & Ground Players of the Week honor.

The Panthers finished the regular season 8–9 and won the NFC South on a three-way tiebreaker, their first division title since 2015. Young made his postseason debut on January 10, 2026, in a 34–31 wild-card loss to the Los Angeles Rams, throwing for 264 yards and a touchdown and rushing for another score. He was ranked No. 98 by his fellow players on the NFL Top 100 Players of 2026.

=== 2026 ===
On April 29, 2026, the Panthers exercised the fifth-year option on Young's rookie contract, keeping him under contract through the 2027 season.

== Career statistics ==
Legend
	Led the league
**Bold**	Career high

=== NFL ===
==== Regular season ====
Year	Team	Games			Passing									Rushing					Sacks		Fumbles	
Year	Team	GP	GS	Record	Cmp	Att	Pct	Yds	Y/A	Lng	TD	Int	Rtg	Att	Yds	Avg	Lng	TD	Sck	SckY	Fum	Lost
2023	CAR	16	16	2–14	**315**	**527**	59.8	2,877	5.5	48	11	10	73.7	39	**253**	**6.5**	26	0	**62**	**477**	**11**	**6**
2024	CAR	14	12	4–8	234	384	60.9	2,403	6.3	**83**	15	9	82.2	43	249	5.8	**34**	**6**	29	186	5	2
2025	CAR	16	16	**8–8**	304	478	**63.6**	**3,011**	6.3	54	**23**	**11**	87.8	**54**	216	4.0	24	2	27	202	7	4
2026	CAR	9	9	4–5	203	338	60.1	2,397	**7.1**	55	16	6	90.1	12	48	4.0	13	1	29	169	2	1
Career		55	53	18–35	1,056	1,727	61.1	10,688	6.2	83	65	36	82.7	148	766	5.2	34	9	147	1,034	25	13

==== Postseason ====
Year	Team	Games			Passing									Rushing					Sacks		Fumbles	
Year	Team	GP	GS	Record	Cmp	Att	Pct	Yds	Y/A	Lng	TD	Int	Rtg	Att	Yds	Avg	Lng	TD	Sck	SckY	Fum	Lost
2025	CAR	1	1	0–1	21	40	52.5	264	6.6	52	1	1	71.3	3	24	8.0	16	1	2	14	0	0
Career		1	1	0–1	21	40	52.5	264	6.6	52	1	1	71.3	3	24	8.0	16	1	2	14	0	0

=== College ===
Season	Team	Games			Passing								Rushing			
Season	Team	GP	GS	Record	Cmp	Att	Pct	Yds	Avg	TD	Int	Rtg	Att	Yds	Avg	TD
2020	Alabama	7	0	—	13	22	59.1	156	7.1	1	0	133.7	9	−23	−2.6	0
2021	Alabama	15	15	**13–2**	**366**	**547**	**67.0**	**4,872**	**8.9**	**47**	**7**	**167.5**	**81**	0	0.0	3
2022	Alabama	12	12	10–2	245	380	64.5	3,328	8.8	32	5	163.2	49	**185**	**3.8**	**4**
Career		34	27	23–4	624	949	65.8	8,356	8.8	80	12	165.0	139	162	1.2	7

== Awards and honors ==
NFL

- NFC Offensive Player of the Week (Week 11, 2025)
- FedEx Air & Ground NFL Players of the Week (Week 11, 2025)
- No. 98 in the Top 100 Players of 2026

College

- CFP national champion (2020)
- Heisman Trophy (2021)
- Maxwell Award (2021)
- AP College Football Player of the Year (2021)
- SN College Football Player of the Year (2021)
- Davey O’Brien Award (2021)
- Manning Award (2021)
- Consensus All-American (2021)
- SEC Male Athlete of the Year (2022)
- SEC Offensive Player of the Year (2021)
- First-team All-SEC (2021)
- Second-team All-SEC (2022)
