= Brad Idzik =

American football player and coach (born 1991)

Carolina Panthers
- Title: Offensive coordinator

Personal information
- Born: October 20, 1991 (age 35); Durham, North Carolina, U.S.

Career information
- Position: Wide receiver
- High school: Mercer Island (Mercer Island, Washington)
- College: Lehigh (2010); Wake Forest (2011–2014)

Career history
- Stanford (2014–2018) Graduate assistant; Seattle Seahawks (2019–2022); Assistant wide receivers coach (2019-2020); Assistant quarterbacks coach & offensive quality control coach (2021); Assistant wide receivers coach (2022); Tampa Bay Buccaneers (2023) Wide receivers coach; Carolina Panthers (2024–present) Offensive coordinator
- Coaching profile at Pro Football Reference

Bradley Idzik (born October 20, 1991) is an American professional football coach who is the offensive coordinator for the Carolina Panthers of the National Football League (NFL). He previously served as the wide receivers coach for the Tampa Bay Buccaneers in 2023 and the assistant wide receivers coach of the Seattle Seahawks for four years.

== Personal life ==
Idzik is the son of former New York Jets general manager, John Idzik Jr.
