= Donte Jackson (American football) =

American football player (born 1995)

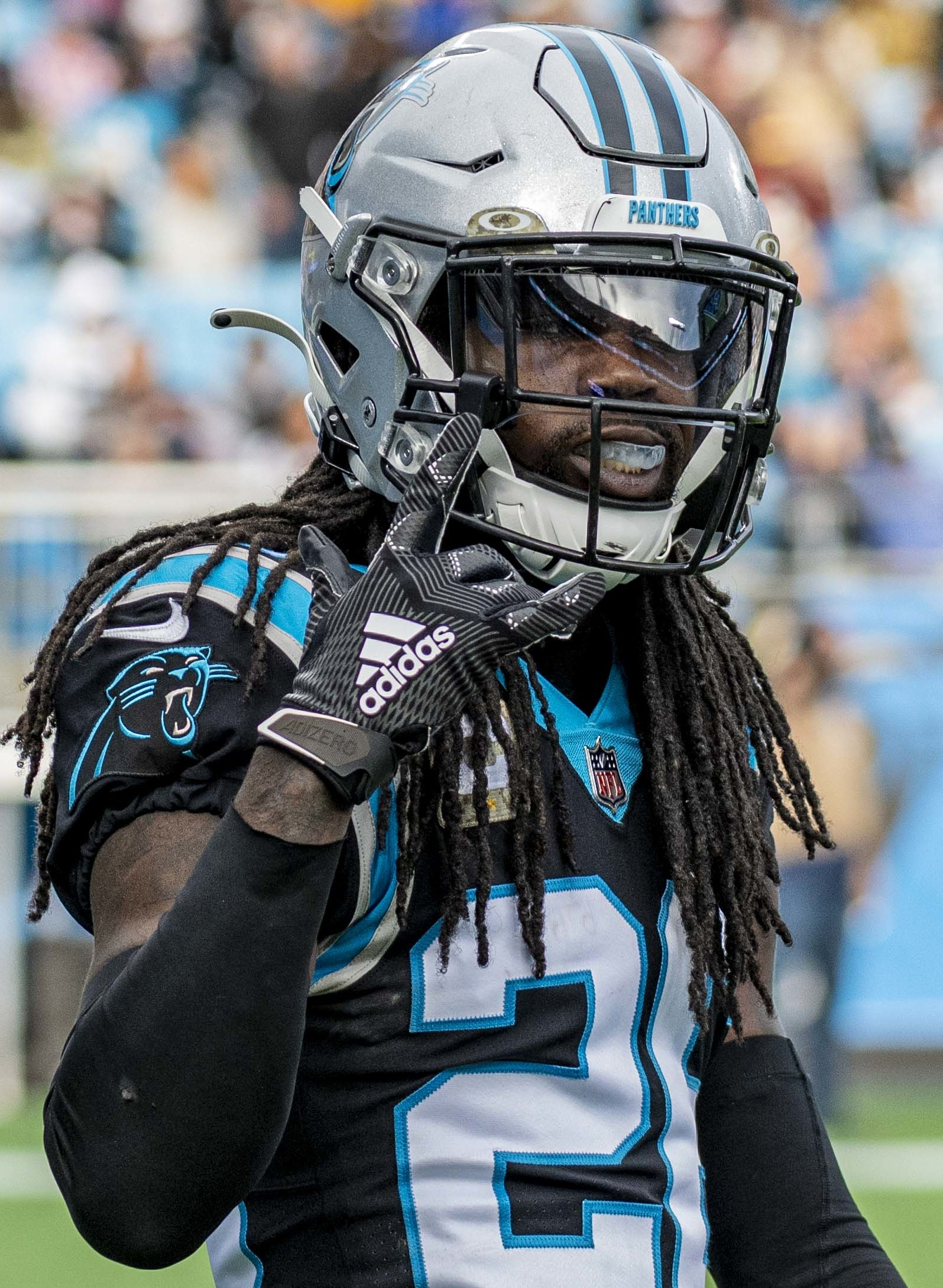
- Jackson with the Carolina Panthers in 2021

No. 26 – Los Angeles Chargers
- Position: Cornerback
- Roster status: Active

Personal information
- Born: November 8, 1995 (age 30); New Orleans, Louisiana, U.S.
- Listed height: 5 ft 10 in (1.78 m)
- Listed weight: 180 lb (82 kg)

Career information
- High school: Riverdale (Jefferson, Louisiana)
- College: LSU (2015–2017)
- NFL draft: 2018: 2nd round, 55th overall pick

Career history
- Carolina Panthers (2018–2023); Pittsburgh Steelers (2024); Los Angeles Chargers (2025–present)

Awards and highlights
- Second-team All-American (2017); Second-team All-SEC (2017)

Career NFL statistics as of Week 5, 2026
- Total tackles: 373
- Sacks: 1
- Forced fumbles: 4
- Fumble recoveries: 3
- Pass deflections: 68
- Interceptions: 23
- Defensive touchdowns: 1
- Stats at Pro Football Reference

Donte Darius Jackson (born November 8, 1995) is an American professional football cornerback for the Los Angeles Chargers of the National Football League (NFL). He played college football for the LSU Tigers, and was selected by the Carolina Panthers in the second round of the 2018 NFL draft.

== Early life ==
Jackson attended Riverdale High School in Jefferson, Louisiana. He committed to Louisiana State University (LSU) to play college football.

== College career ==
Jackson played at LSU from 2015 to 2017 under head coaches Les Miles and Ed Orgeron. After his junior season in 2017, he decided to forgo his senior year and enter the 2018 NFL draft. During his career he had 110 tackles, four interceptions and one sack. Jackson was an accomplished sprinter on LSU's track and field team. He has personal bests of 6.63 and 10.22 in the 60 and 100 meters, respectively. He was named the fastest player in college football in 2017.

== Professional career ==
=== Pre-draft ===
On January 9, 2018, Jackson released a statement on his Twitter account announcing his decision to forgo his remaining eligibility to enter the 2018 NFL draft. He attended the NFL Scouting Combine in Indianapolis and performed the majority of drills before developing cramps. Jackson's 40-yard dash tied Tulane's Parry Nickerson and Ohio State's Denzel Ward for the best time among all players at the NFL Combine.

External videos
- Donte Jackson's NFL Combine Workout
- Donte Jackson's 40-yard dash
- Donte Jackson runs positional drills

On April 4, 2018, Jackson participated at LSU's pro day and performed the 40-yard dash (4.31s), 20-yard dash (2.54s), (1.54s), vertical jump (37"), and broad jump (10'2"). At the conclusion of the pre-draft process, he was projected to be a second round pick by NFL draft experts and scouts. He was ranked as the sixth best cornerback prospect in the draft by DraftScout.com and NFL analyst Mike Mayock.

Pre-draft measurables
Height	Weight	Arm length	Hand span	Wingspan	40-yard dash	10-yard split	20-yard split	Vertical jump	Broad jump	Bench press
5 ft 10 1/2 in (1.79 m)	178 lb (81 kg)	29 1/2 in (0.75 m)	8 3/4 in (0.22 m)	5 ft 11 5/8 in (1.82 m)	4.31 s	1.54 s	2.54 s	37.0 in (0.94 m)	10 ft 4 in (3.15 m)	7 reps
All values from NFL Combine/Pro Day

External videos
- Panthers draft Donte Jackson 55th overall
- NFL Draft Profile: Donte Jackson

=== Carolina Panthers ===
The Carolina Panthers selected Jackson in the second round (55th overall) of the 2018 NFL draft. He was the sixth cornerback drafted in 2018.

==== 2018 ====
On May 10, 2018, the Carolina Panthers signed Jackson to a four-year, $4.81 million contract that includes $2.27 million guaranteed and a signing bonus of $1.58 million.

Throughout training camp, Jackson competed against veteran Ross Cockrell to be a starting cornerback. He became the likely candidate to earn the role after Cockrell sustained a season ending leg injury that required surgery. Head coach Ron Rivera named Jackson and James Bradberry the starting cornerback duo to begin the regular season.

On September 9, 2018, Jackson started in his professional regular season debut and recorded five combined tackles (four solo) in the Panthers' 16–8 victory against the Dallas Cowboys in their home opener. On September 16, 2018, Jackson had his breakout performance in a 24–31 loss at the Atlanta Falcons, collecting seven solo tackles, deflecting a pass, forcing a fumble, and making his first career interception off a pass attempt by Matt Ryan. In Week 3, he made seven solo tackles, two pass deflections, and a career-high two interceptions off of pass attempts by Andy Dalton in a 31–21 victory over the Cincinnati Bengals. In Week 14, he made a season-high ten combined tackles (eight solo) and two pass deflections during a 26–20 loss at the Cleveland Browns. On December 17, 2018, Jackson recorded three combined tackles (two solo), a pass deflection, and returned an interception by Drew Brees that was intended for wide receiver Michael Thomas during a two point conversion on an extra point attempt in the Panthers' 9–12 loss to the New Orleans Saints. He finished his rookie season in 2018 starting all 16 games with a total of 74 combined tackles (63 solo), a sack, nine pass deflections, a forced fumble, and a team-leading four interceptions, which led all rookies in 2018.

==== 2019 ====
He entered training camp slated to return as a starting cornerback. Defensive coordinator Eric Washington named James Bradberry and Jackson to start the season as the starting cornerbacks, alongside safeties Eric Reid and Tre Boston.

On September 22, 2019, Jackson recorded five solo tackles, two pass deflections, and tied his career-high of two interceptions by picking off two pass attempts by Kyler Murray in a 38–20 win at the Arizona Cardinals. He was inactive for three games (Weeks 4–6) after sustaining a groin injury. In Week 10, he made five solo tackles and a season-high five pass deflections as the Panthers lost 16–24 to the Green Bay Packers. Jackson was demoted to a backup and was replaced by Ross Cockrell for the final two games of the season. 40 combined tackles (32 solo), eight pass deflections, three interceptions, and two fumble recoveries in 13 games and then starts.

==== 2020 ====
Jackson entered training camp slated as the primary starting cornerback after James Bradberry signed with the New York Giants. Defensive coordinator Phil Snow named Jackson and Eli Apple as the starting cornerbacks to begin the season, along with starting safeties Tre Boston and Jeremy Chinn.

In Week 2, Jackson recorded three combined tackles (one solo), a pass deflection, and made his first interception of the season off a pass thrown by Tom Brady that was intended for tight end Rob Gronkowski during the 31–17 loss at the Tampa Bay Buccaneers. The following week, Jackson had one tackle, a season-high two pass deflections, and intercepted a pass thrown by Justin Herbert that was intended for Keenan Allen during a 21–16 win at the Los Angeles Chargers in Week 3. He was inactive for two games (Weeks 11–12) due to a lingering toe injury he had been dealing with throughout the season. He finished his sophomore season in 2020 with a total of 34 combined tackles (22 solo), 11 pass deflections, and three interceptions in 14 games and 13 starts. The Carolina Panthers ended the season with a 5–11 record and missed the playoffs after finishing third in the NFC South.

==== 2021 ====
He entered training camp slated to return as a starting cornerback. Head coach Matt Rhule named Jackson and rookie first round pick Jaycee Horn the starting cornerback duo to kickoff the season, alongside safeties Jeremy Chinn and Juston Burris.

On November 28, 2021, Jackson collected a season-high 11 combined tackles (ten solo) and made one pass deflection in a 10-33 loss at the Miami Dolphins. He exited the game in the fourth quarter due to an injury. On November 30, 2021, the Carolina Panthers officially placed Jackson on injured reserve due to a groin injury. He started all 12 games he appeared in and finished the 2021 NFL season with a total of 61 combined tackles (50 solo), ten pass deflections, a forced fumble, a tackle for-a-loss, and two interceptions.

==== 2022 ====
On March 19, 2022, the Carolina Panthers signed Jackson to a three-year, $35.18 million contract extension that includes $16.75 million guaranteed and a signing bonus of $11.00 million. He entered training camp as the de facto starting cornerback. The duo of Jackson and Jaycee Horn returned as the starting cornerbacks to begin the season.

On October 16, 2022, Jackson recorded two solo tackles, made one pass deflection, and returned an interception by Matthew Stafford for 30-yards, scoring his first career touchdown during the second quarter of a 10–24 loss at the Los Angeles Rams. In Week 7, he collected a season-high ten solo tackles in the Panthers' 21–3 victory against the Tampa Bay Buccaneers. He was inactive for the Panthers' 21-42 loss at the Cincinnati Bengals due to an ankle injury. On November 10, 2022, Jackson made three combined tackles (two solo) and a pass deflection before suffering an injury during a 25–15 win against the Atlanta Falcons in Week 10. On November 14, 2022, the Carolina Panthers officially placed Jackson on season-ending injured reserve after it was discovered he sustained a torn Achilles tendon in Week 10. He missed the remaining seven games (Weeks 11–18) of the season. He finished the 2022 NFL season with 35 combined tackles (32 solo), three pass deflections, two interceptions, and a touchdown in nine games and nine starts.

==== 2023 ====
Jackson began training camp on the physically unable to perform list. Defensive coordinator Ejiro Evero named Jackson and Jaycee Horn the starting cornerbacks to begin the regular season, along in the secondary with starting safeties Vonn Bell and Xavier Woods.

He was inactive for the Panthers' Week 5 24–42 loss at the Detroit Lions due to a shoulder injury. On November 27, 2023, the Panthers announced their decision to fire head coach Frank Reich after recording a 1–10 record and opted to name special teams coordinator Chris Tabor the interim head coach. On January 7, 2024, he collected a season-high seven combined tackles (six solo) during a 0–9 loss to the Tampa Bay Buccaneers. He completed the 2023 NFL season with 59 combined tackles (49 solo), five tackles for-a-loss, and five pass deflections in 16 games and 16 starts.

=== Pittsburgh Steelers ===
==== 2024 ====
On March 13, 2024, the Carolina Panthers traded Jackson and a seventh round pick (240th overall) to the Pittsburgh Steelers in exchange for wide receiver Diontae Johnson and a sixth round pick (178th overall) in the 2024 NFL draft. On March 18, 2024, the Steelers and Jackson agreed to restructure his contract to a one–year, $6 million deal that includes a signing bonus of $4.75 million.

Head coach Mike Tomlin had reportedly been interested in drafting Jackson in 2018 and also attempted to have him acquired when he was a free agent in 2022. Defensive coordinator Teryl Austin selected him to be a starting cornerback to be paired with Joey Porter Jr. and slot cornerback Beanie Bishop.

On September 8, 2024, he made his debut with the Pittsburgh Steelers during a 18–10 win at the Atlanta Falcons, recording two combined tackles (one solo), two pass deflections, and intercepted a pass by Kirk Cousins. In Week 5, Jackson recorded a season-high four solo tackles, deflected a pass, and intercepted a pass by Dak Prescott intended for wide receiver CeeDee Lamb during a 17–20 loss to the Dallas Cowboys. He sustained a back injury during a 13-27 loss at the Philadelphia Eagles and was subsequently inactive in a Week 16 loss at the Baltimore Ravens.

=== Los Angeles Chargers ===
==== 2025 ====
On March 12, 2025, Jackson signed with the Los Angeles Chargers on a two-year, $13 million contract.

== NFL career statistics ==
Legend
**Bold**	Career high

=== Regular season ===
Year	Team	Games		Tackles						Interceptions						Fumbles			
Year	Team	GP	GS	Cmb	Solo	Ast	Sck	TFL	Sfty	PD	Int	Yds	Avg	Lng	TD	FF	FR	Yds	TD
2018	CAR	16	16	**74**	**63**	11	**1.0**	4	0	9	4	0	0.0	0	0	**1**	0	0	0
2019	CAR	13	10	40	32	8	0.0	1	0	8	3	25	8.3	25	0	0	**2**	**-1**	0
2020	CAR	14	13	34	22	**12**	0.0	1	0	11	3	**110**	**36.7**	**66**	0	0	0	0	0
2021	CAR	12	12	61	50	11	0.0	3	0	10	2	21	10.5	21	0	**1**	0	0	0
2022	CAR	9	9	35	32	3	0.0	1	0	3	2	30	15.0	30	**1**	0	0	0	0
2023	CAR	16	16	59	49	10	0.0	**5**	0	5	0	0	0.0	0	0	**1**	0	0	0
2024	PIT	15	15	38	28	10	0.0	2	0	8	**5**	88	17.6	49	0	0	1	**-1**	0
2025	LAC	17	15	24	16	8	0.0	1	0	**12**	4	27	6.8	21	0	0	0	0	0
2026	LAC	4	3	8	6	2	0.0	1	0	2	0	0	0.0	0	0	1	0	0	0
Career		116	109	373	298	75	1.0	19	0	68	23	301	13.1	66	1	4	3	-2	0

=== Postseason ===
Year	Team	Games		Tackles						Interceptions						Fumbles			
Year	Team	GP	GS	Cmb	Solo	Ast	Sck	TFL	Sfty	PD	Int	Yds	Avg	Lng	TD	FF	FR	Yds	TD
2024	PIT	1	1	**2**	**1**	**1**	0.0	0	0	0	0	0	0.0	0	0	0	0	0	0
2025	LAC	1	1	1	0	**1**	0.0	0	0	0	0	0	0.0	0	0	0	0	0	0
Career		2	2	3	1	2	0.0	0	0	0	0	0	0.0	0	0	0	0	0	0
