= Jaycee Horn =

American football player (born 1999)

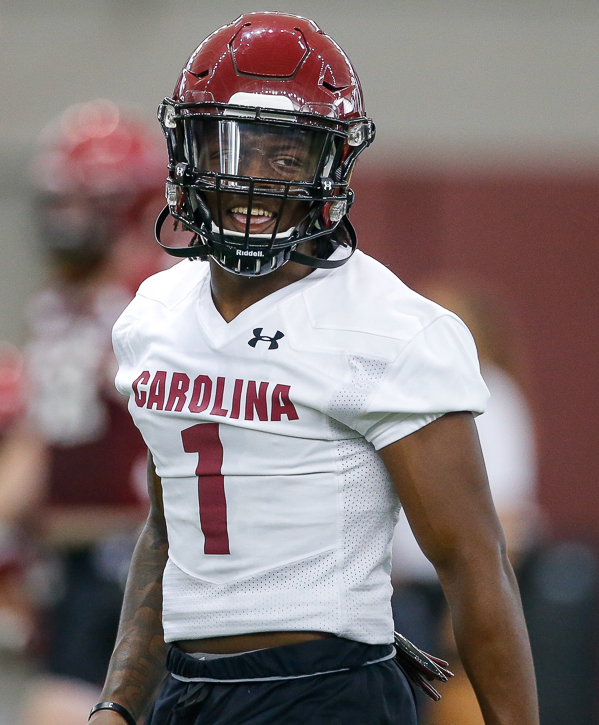
- Horn with the South Carolina Gamecocks in 2019

No. 8 – Carolina Panthers
- Position: Cornerback
- Roster status: Injured reserve

Personal information
- Born: November 26, 1999 (age 26); Alpharetta, Georgia, U.S.
- Listed height: 6 ft 1 in (1.85 m)
- Listed weight: 212 lb (96 kg)

Career information
- High school: Alpharetta
- College: South Carolina (2018–2020)
- NFL draft: 2021: 1st round, 8th overall pick

Career history
- Carolina Panthers (2021–present)

Awards and highlights
- 2× Pro Bowl (2024, 2025)

Career NFL statistics as of Week 3, 2026
- Tackles: 196
- Sacks: 2
- Pass deflections: 36
- Interceptions: 10
- Stats at Pro Football Reference

Jaycee Carrington Horn (born November 26, 1999) is an American professional football cornerback for the Carolina Panthers of the National Football League (NFL). He played college football for the South Carolina Gamecocks and was selected eighth overall by the Panthers in the 2021 NFL draft. His father, Joe Horn, played wide receiver in the NFL.

== Early life ==
Horn attended Alpharetta High School in Alpharetta, Georgia. As a senior, he had 44 tackles and five interceptions. He played in the 2018 U.S. Army All-American Bowl. He signed to play college football at the University of South Carolina.

== College career ==
As a true freshman at South Carolina in 2018, Horn started 10 of 11 games and had 45 tackles with two sacks and was named freshman All-Southeastern Conference. As a sophomore in 2019, he started all 12 games, recording 40 tackles and one sack. Horn returned to South Carolina as a starter in 2020.

On November 16, 2020, following the dismissal of former head coach Will Muschamp, Horn opted out of the remainder of the season, turning his focus to preparation for the 2021 NFL draft.

== Professional career ==
=== Pre-draft ===
Pro Football Focus ranked Horn as the second best cornerback in the draft (18th overall) on their big board. Dane Brugler of The Athletic ranked him as the third best cornerback prospect in the draft. Lorenz Leinweber of Sports Illustratedand NFL analysts Bucky Brooks and Daniel Jeremiah had him ranked as the second best cornerback in the 2021 NFL draft. Mel Kiper Jr. of ESPN ranked him third (18th overall) of his position group.

External videos
- 2021 Draft Prospects: Jaycee Horn

Pre-draft measurables
| Height | Weight | Arm length | Hand span | Wingspan | 40-yard dash | 10-yard split | 20-yard split | Vertical jump | Broad jump | Bench press |
|---|---|---|---|---|---|---|---|---|---|---|
| 6 ft 0 3/4 in (1.85 m) | 205 lb (93 kg) | 33 in (0.84 m) | 9 1/8 in (0.23 m) | 6 ft 5 1/4 in (1.96 m) | 4.40 s | 1.55 s | 2.60 s | 41.5 in (1.05 m) | 11 ft 1 in (3.38 m) | 19 reps |
All values from Pro Day

=== 2021 ===
The Carolina Panthers selected Horn in the first round (8th overall) in the 2021 NFL draft. Horn was the first cornerback and defensive back to be drafted in 2021. As the 8th overall pick, Horn was the highest draft pick from South Carolina since Jadeveon Clowney in 2014 and the highest drafted cornerback from South Carolina, overtaking Dunta Robinson (2004) and Stephon Gilmore (2012) who were both respectively drafted 10th overall.

External videos
- Panthers draft Jaycee Horn No. 8
- Jaycee Horn reacts to getting drafted

On June 15, 2021, the Panthers signed Horn to a fully guaranteed four–year, $21.11 million contract that includes an initial signing bonus of $12.71 million. Throughout training camp, Horn competed to be one of the starting cornerbacks against veterans Donte Jackson and A. J. Bouye. Head coach Matt Rhule named Horn and Jackson the starting cornerbacks to begin the regular season.

On September 12, 2021, Horn made his professional regular season debut in the Carolina Panthers' home–opener against the New York Jets and had a season–high three combined tackles (two solo) during a 19–14 victory. On September 19, 2021, Horn had one pass deflection and made his first career interception on a pass thrown by Jameis Winston to wide receiver Juwan Johnson as the Panthers routed the New Orleans Saints 26–7. On September 23, 2021, he made two combined tackles (one solo) before exiting in the third quarter of a 24–9 win at the Houston Texans after injuring his foot. On September 27, 2021, the Carolina Panther placed Horn on injured reserve after it was discovered he had fractured his foot. He finished his rookie campaign during the 2021 NFL season with a total of five combined tackles (three solo), one pass deflection, and one interception in three games and three starts.

=== 2022 ===
He entered training camp in 2022 and competed against Donte Jackson and C. J. Henderson to be the No. 1 starting cornerback. Head coach Matt Rhule named him the No. 1 starting cornerback to begin the regular season, alongside Donte Jackson.

On September 25, 2022, Horn made two combined tackles (one solo), a season-high three pass deflections, and intercepted a pass thrown by Jameis Winston to Chris Olave during a 22–14 victory against the New Orleans Saints. He was inactive for two games (Weeks 6–7) after injuring his ribs. In Week 14, he collected a season-high six combined tackles (five solo), two pass deflections, and intercepted a pass by Geno Smith to wide receiver Tyler Lockett during a 30–24 win at the Seattle Seahawks. On December 24, 2022, he tied his season-high of six combined tackles before exiting during the fourth quarter of a 37–23 win against the Detroit Lions after suffering an injury while tackling wide receiver Josh Reynolds. On December 25, 2022, Carolina Panthers' interim head coach Steve Wilkes announced that Horn had suffered a broken wrist and would have to undergo surgery and miss the last two games (Weeks 17–18) of the season. He finished the 2022 NFL season with 53 combined tackles (37 solo), seven pass deflections, and a team-leading three interceptions through 13 games and 13 starts.

=== 2023 ===
On January 26, 2023, the Carolina Panthers hired Frank Reich as their new head coach. Defensive coordinator Ejiro Evero named Horn and Donte Jackson the starting cornerbacks to begin the season. On September 10, 2023, Horn started in the Carolina Panthers' season–opener at the Atlanta Falcons and made one tackle before exiting in the first quarter during a 24–10 loss due to an injury. On September 15, 2023, The Carolina Panthers placed Horn on injured reserve due to a hamstring injury. On November 27, 2023, the Carolina Panthers fired head coach Frank Reich after a 1–10 start. On December 2, 2023, he was activated off of injured reserve. In Week 14, he collected a season-high seven combined tackles (six solo) during a 6–28 loss at the New Orleans Saints. He finished the 2023 NFL season with only 27 combined tackles (20 solo) and five pass deflections in six games and six starts.

=== 2024 ===
On January 25, 2024, the Carolina Panthers announced the hiring of former Tampa Bay Buccaneers' offensive coordinator Dave Canales as their new head coach. On April 26, 2024, the Carolina Panthers exercised the fifth–year option on Horn's rookie contract for one–year, $12.37 million contract.

Canales retained Ejiro Evero as defensive coordinator. Head coach Dave Canales named Horn the No. 1 starting cornerback to begin the regular season and paired him with Mike Jackson.

On September 15, 2024, Horn made six combined tackles (four solo), a season-high two pass deflections, and intercepted a pass thrown by Justin Herbert to wide receiver Ladd McConkey during a 3–26 loss to the Los Angeles Chargers. In Week 4, he collected a season–high eight combined tackles (seven solo) as the Panthers lost 24–34 to the Cincinnati Bengals. On November 24, 2024, Horn made six solo tackles and recorded his first career sack for a 12–yard loss on Patrick Mahomes during a 27–30 loss to the Kansas City Chiefs. Horn injured his hip and subsequently missed the last two games (Weeks 17–18) of the 2024 NFL season. He finished the season with a career-high 68 combined tackles (49 solo), 13 pass deflections, a career-high two sacks, and one interception in. 15 games and 15 starts.

=== 2025 ===
On March 10, 2025, Horn signed a four–year, $100 million contract extension with the Panthers that includes $72 million guaranteed, $46.7 million guaranteed upon signing, and an initial signing bonus of $28.4 million. His deal made him the highest-paid defensive back in the league. He started 16 games in 2025, recording 37 tackles, eight passes defensed, and a team-leading five interceptions, on his way to his second straight Pro Bowl.

=== 2026 ===
On September 30, 2026, Horn was placed on injured reserve after suffering a quad injury in Week 3.

== NFL career statistics ==
Legend
| **Bold** | Career high |

=== Regular season ===
| Year | Team | Games | | Tackles | | | | | | Interceptions | | | | | | Fumbles | | |
| Year | Team | GP | GS | Comb | Solo | Ast | Sck | TFL | Sfty | PD | Int | Yds | Avg | Lng | TD | FF | FR | TD |
|---|---|---|---|---|---|---|---|---|---|---|---|---|---|---|---|---|---|---|
| 2021 | CAR | 3 | 3 | 5 | 3 | 2 | 0.0 | 0 | 0 | 1 | 1 | 13 | 13.0 | 13 | 0 | 0 | 0 | 0 |
| 2022 | CAR | 13 | 13 | 53 | 37 | 16 | 0.0 | 2 | 0 | 7 | 3 | **49** | **16.3** | **31** | 0 | 0 | 0 | 0 |
| 2023 | CAR | 6 | 6 | 27 | 20 | 7 | 0.0 | 1 | 0 | 5 | 0 | 0 | 0.0 | 0 | 0 | 0 | 0 | 0 |
| 2024 | CAR | 15 | 15 | **68** | **49** | **19** | **2.0** | **5** | 0 | **13** | 1 | 0 | 0.0 | 0 | 0 | 0 | 0 | 0 |
| 2025 | CAR | **16** | **16** | 37 | 26 | 11 | 0.0 | 1 | 0 | 8 | **5** | 46 | 9.2 | 22 | 0 | 0 | 0 | 0 |
| 2026 | CAR | 3 | 3 | 6 | 4 | 2 | 0.0 | 0 | 0 | 2 | 0 | 0 | 0.0 | 0 | 0 | 0 | 0 | 0 |
| Career | | 56 | 56 | 196 | 139 | 57 | 2.0 | 9 | 0 | 36 | 10 | 108 | 10.8 | 31 | 0 | 0 | 0 | 0 |

=== Postseason ===
| Year | Team | Games | | Tackles | | | | | | Interceptions | | | | | | Fumbles | | |
| Year | Team | GP | GS | Comb | Solo | Ast | Sck | TFL | Sfty | PD | Int | Yds | Avg | Lng | TD | FF | FR | TD |
|---|---|---|---|---|---|---|---|---|---|---|---|---|---|---|---|---|---|---|
| 2025 | CAR | 1 | 1 | 4 | 2 | 2 | 0.0 | 0 | 0 | 1 | 0 | 0 | 0 | 0 | 0 | 0 | 0 | 0 |
| Career | | 1 | 1 | 4 | 2 | 2 | 0.0 | 0 | 0 | 1 | 0 | 0 | 0 | 0 | 0 | 0 | 0 | 0 |

== Personal life ==
His father, Joe Horn, played as a wide receiver in the NFL. He is also the brother of the former NFL wide receiver Joe Horn Jr. He is in a relationship with WNBA player and South Carolina alum Brea Beal.
