= Joe Horn =

American football player and coach (born 1972)

No. 17, 87, 84
- Position: Wide receiver

Personal information
- Born: January 16, 1972 (age 54); New Haven, Connecticut, U.S.
- Listed height: 6 ft 1 in (1.85 m)
- Listed weight: 208 lb (94 kg)

Career information
- High school: Douglas Byrd (Fayetteville, North Carolina)
- College: Itawamba (1991–1992)
- NFL draft: 1996: 5th round, 135th overall pick

Career history

Playing
- Baltimore Stallions (1994)*; Shreveport Pirates (1995)*; Memphis Mad Dogs (1995); Kansas City Chiefs (1996–1999); New Orleans Saints (2000–2006); Atlanta Falcons (2007)
- * Offseason or practice squad member only

Coaching
- Northeast Mississippi CC (2015–present) Wide receivers coach

Awards and highlights
- 4× Pro Bowl (2000–2002, 2004); New Orleans Saints Hall of Fame

Career NFL statistics
- Receptions: 603
- Receiving yards: 8,744
- Receiving touchdowns: 58
- Stats at Pro Football Reference

Joseph Horn (born January 16, 1972) is an American former professional football player who was a wide receiver in the National Football League (NFL). He was selected by the Kansas City Chiefs in the fifth round of the 1996 NFL draft, and also played for the New Orleans Saints, the Atlanta Falcons, and the Memphis Mad Dogs of the Canadian Football League (CFL). He played college football for the Itawamba Indians. After his playing career, he became an assistant coach at Northeast Mississippi Community College.

== Early life ==
Horn attended Douglas Byrd High School in Fayetteville, North Carolina, where he played for legendary coach Bob Paroli. He stood out as a quarterback, tailback, wide receiver, and punter. He was only voted to the Mid-South 4A All-Star team as a punter. Horn was also a standout basketball player in which he started every game for the Douglas Byrd Eagles as a point guard. Horn nearly signed with the University of South Carolina and had offers from other Division I programs. However, his academic performance and SAT score were insufficient for Division I schools.

== College career ==
Horn played two years of college football (1991–1992) at Itawamba Community College in Fulton, Mississippi. At Itawamba, he picked up 54 catches for 878 yards and seven touchdowns as a wide receiver and a punt returner. Still unable to qualify for Division I college football, he returned to Fayetteville and worked at a fast food restaurant and at a furniture factory.

== Professional career ==
Horn did not play a down of football for two years after leaving college. After playing two years at Itawamba Community College in Fulton, Mississippi, Horn worked at a Bojangles' restaurant in Fayetteville, North Carolina. Down to his final few dollars, he bought a Jerry Rice workout video from a local Blockbuster and studied the drills and moves Rice performed in the film. Horn then made a highlight video of himself working out and sent the tape to multiple professional teams across the United States and Canada.

=== Canadian Football League ===
Horn tried out for the CFL Baltimore Stallions and was signed to the practice squad, but never played in a game for the team. Horn also had a minor stint with the Shreveport Pirates. On March 28, 1995, Horn was signed by the Memphis Mad Dogs. With Memphis, Horn played well in 1995, with 71 catches for 1,415 yards, and caught the attention of NFL scouts.

=== Kansas City Chiefs ===
Horn was selected by the Kansas City Chiefs in the fifth round of the 1996 NFL draft with the 135th overall pick. He was mainly relegated to special teams and reserve duty at WR during his four seasons with the Chiefs. In his years there, he gained 879 receiving yards on 53 receptions with seven touchdowns, starting only two games.

=== New Orleans Saints ===
Horn signed with the New Orleans Saints in 2000 and ranked in the top ten in receptions (7th), yards (8th) and touchdowns (9th) that year. Given a starting role with the Saints, "Hollywood", a nickname he picked up while with the Kansas City Chiefs for his particular style of dress and a name which carries to this day, quickly proved himself to be a premiere NFL receiver. He was selected to the Pro Bowl four out of his seven years with the Saints, and set single season franchise records for receiving yards (1,399), and receiving touchdowns (11-shared with Marques Colston) as well as the career franchise record for receiving touchdowns (50, a record surpassed by Colston in 2012.). Horn is also the Saints' all-time leader in 100-yard receiving games at 27. Horn had a career year in 2004 with his 1,399 receiving yards being second most in the league. His total was only six yards behind Carolina Panthers WR Muhsin Muhammad. The Saints signed Horn to a six-year contract extension in 2005.

In the wake of Hurricane Katrina, Horn was noted for his support for the people of New Orleans and the Gulf region. As a leader of the Saints, he served as a public face of the team in many community events in recent months. He frequently visited evacuees in both San Antonio and the Houston Astrodome during the aftermath of Katrina. He criticized the NFL for not making a greater effort to care for the future of the Saints during this time of crisis.Beyond Katrina, to this day Joe donates time, energy and money to local charities in New Orleans and beyond.

After the 2006 season the Saints asked the then 35-year-old receiver (who had suffered a groin injury during the 2006 season and had hamstring injuries in the past) to accept a pay cut. He refused and asked to be released. He was cut soon after his request.

Horn set the Saints career mark in receiving touchdowns (50), making the Pro Bowl four times in five seasons, and compiled the second most receptions (523) and receiving yards (7,622) in Saints history.

=== Atlanta Falcons ===
In early March 2007, Horn started negotiations with the Atlanta Falcons. He signed a 4-year, $15 million contract with Atlanta. Later, in 2008, he requested to be traded from the team saying he didn't want to be a "just-in-case guy" for the Falcons. On August 19, 2008, the Falcons cut him. In his only season with the Falcons he made 27 receptions for 243 yards and one touchdown in 12 games.

=== Retirement ===
Horn worked out for the Lions, Titans, and Giants, but they ultimately passed and he did not play in the 2008 or 2009 seasons. In May 2010, Horn was selected for induction into the Saints Hall of Fame. On June 23, 2010, it was announced that Horn had signed a contract with the Saints. Two days later, on June 25, it was announced that Horn would officially retire from football as a member of the Saints. Since retirement, Horn has focused his efforts on creating and selling his own "Bayou 87" barbecue sauce.

== NFL career statistics ==
Year	Team	GP	Receiving						Fumbles	
Year	Team	GP	Rec	Yds	Avg	Lng	TD	FD	Fum	Lost
1996	KC	9	2	30	15.0	21	0	1	0	0
1997	KC	8	2	65	32.5	47	0	2	0	0
1998	KC	16	14	198	14.1	57	1	11	1	1
1999	KC	16	35	586	16.7	76	6	28	0	0
2000	NO	16	94	1,340	14.3	52	8	63	1	0
2001	NO	16	83	1,265	15.2	56	9	59	1	1
2002	NO	16	88	1,312	14.9	63	7	65	1	0
2003	NO	15	78	973	12.5	50	10	52	2	0
2004	NO	16	94	1,399	14.9	57	11	73	0	0
2005	NO	13	49	654	13.3	30	1	37	2	2
2006	NO	10	37	679	18.4	72	4	28	0	0
2007	ATL	12	27	243	9.0	26	1	17	0	0
Career		163	603	8,744	14.5	76	58	436	8	4

== Cell phone celebration ==
Always a spirited and outspoken player, Horn gained notoriety for a memorable touchdown celebration on ESPN Sunday Night Football against the New York Giants during the 2003 season. After scoring his second touchdown in a game in which he scored four, he pulled a cell phone out from underneath the goalpost padding with the help of teammate Michael Lewis and pretended to make a call. Horn's prank drew a 15-yard penalty for unsportsmanlike conduct and a $30,000 fine by the NFL. He later stated that he did not realize what he had done right away. This celebration was later used in the video game Blitz: The League, which allows excessive celebrations.

Fifteen years later, New Orleans Saints wide receiver Michael Thomas recreated Horn's famous celebration in a game against the Los Angeles Rams after scoring a 72-yard touchdown. Horn "teared up" at the gesture, bought Thomas' jersey and called him the NFL's best wide receiver.

== Lawsuit against the NFL ==
In December 2011, Horn made headlines when he and a group of 11 other former professional players filed a lawsuit against the NFL. Horn and his attorneys allege that the league failed to properly treat head injuries in spite of prevailing medical evidence, leading the players to develop effects of brain injury ranging from chronic headaches to depression.

== Coaching career ==
Prior to the 2014 season, Horn became a volunteer wide receivers coach for Northeast Mississippi Community College in Booneville, Mississippi.

== Healthcare fraud case ==
On December 12, 2019, federal prosecutors announced that Horn was one of 12 former NFL players charged with defrauding the league's retiree health care plan out of $3.4 million via phony claims for medical equipment. Horn stood accused of conspiracy to commit health care fraud. One week later, he pled guilty to one count of conspiracy to commit health care fraud. In November 2021, Horn was sentenced to three years of probation and ordered to perform 200 hours of community service.

== Personal life ==
Horn is married with six children. His son, Joe Jr., played wide receiver for Northeast Mississippi Community College for the 2014 and 2015 seasons.

His son, Jaycee, played college football as a cornerback for South Carolina. He was selected 8th overall in the 2021 NFL draft, by the Carolina Panthers.
