= Joe Horn Jr. =

American football player (born 1994)

No. 87, 2
- Position: Wide receiver

Personal information
- Born: September 16, 1994 (age 32); Tupelo, Mississippi, U.S.
- Listed height: 5 ft 10 in (1.78 m)
- Listed weight: 174 lb (79 kg)

Career information
- High school: Peachtree Ridge (Suwanee, Georgia)
- College: Northeast Mississippi (2014–2015); Missouri Western State (2016–2018)
- NFL draft: 2019: undrafted

Career history
- Baltimore Ravens (2019)*; Houston Roughnecks (2020)*; New York Guardians (2020)
- * Offseason or practice squad member only

Awards and highlights
- MACJC All-State Second-Team (2014)

Joe Horn Jr. (born September 16, 1994) is an American former professional football wide receiver. He played college football at Missouri Western State.

== Early life ==
Horn was born on September 16, 1994, in Tupelo, Mississippi. He attended and played high school football for Peachtree Ridge in Suwanee, Georgia. In 2012 as a junior, he caught 43 passes for 683 yards and seven touchdowns, while also leading the team to the state playoffs. He received multiple scholarship offers from UCLA, East Carolina, and Southern Mississippi.

== College career ==
=== Northeast Mississippi ===
From 2014 to 2015, Horn attended and played college football for Northeast Mississippi Community College. He caught 51 passes for 690 yards and seven touchdowns during his two-year stint.

In 2014, he was named to the Mississippi Association of Community and Junior Colleges (MACJC) All-State Second-Team. He played in nine games for the Tigers, recording 33 receptions for 435 yards and six touchdowns. He recorded a career-high 105 receiving yards and three touchdowns in the team's 49–35 win over Northwest.

=== Missouri Western State ===
In 2018, Horn caught fifteen passes for 246 yards, including a season-high 58 yards against Washburn.

== Professional career ==
Pre-draft measurables
Height	Weight	Arm length	Hand span	Wingspan	40-yard dash	10-yard split	20-yard split	20-yard shuttle	Three-cone drill	Vertical jump	Broad jump	Bench press
5 ft 10 1/4 in (1.78 m)	174 lb (79 kg)	29 3/4 in (0.76 m)	9 1/8 in (0.23 m)	6 ft 1 1/8 in (1.86 m)	4.52 s	1.66 s	2.63 s	4.41 s	7.19 s	35.0 in (0.89 m)	10 ft 0 in (3.05 m)	10 reps
All values from Pro Day

=== Baltimore Ravens ===
On May 14, 2019, Horn Jr. signed with the Baltimore Ravens as an undrafted free agent. He was waived by the Ravens during final roster cuts on August 30.

=== Houston Roughnecks ===
In October 2019, he was drafted by the Houston Roughnecks in the 2020 XFL draft.

=== New York Guardians ===
On January 17, 2020, he was traded to the New York Guardians in exchange for wide receiver Taivon Jacobs. He had his contract terminated when the league suspended operations on April 10.

== Personal life ==
Horn Jr. is the son of four-time Pro Bowl wide receiver Joe Horn. His brother, Jaycee Horn, is a cornerback for the Carolina Panthers.
