= 2023 Carolina Panthers season =

29th season in franchise history

- Owner: David Tepper
- General manager: Scott Fitterer
- Head coach: Frank Reich (fired November 27; 1–10 record); Chris Tabor (interim; 1–5 record)
- Home stadium: Bank of America Stadium

Results
- Record: 2–15
- Division place: 4th NFC South
- Playoffs: Did not qualify
- Pro Bowlers: DE Derrick Brown

Uniform
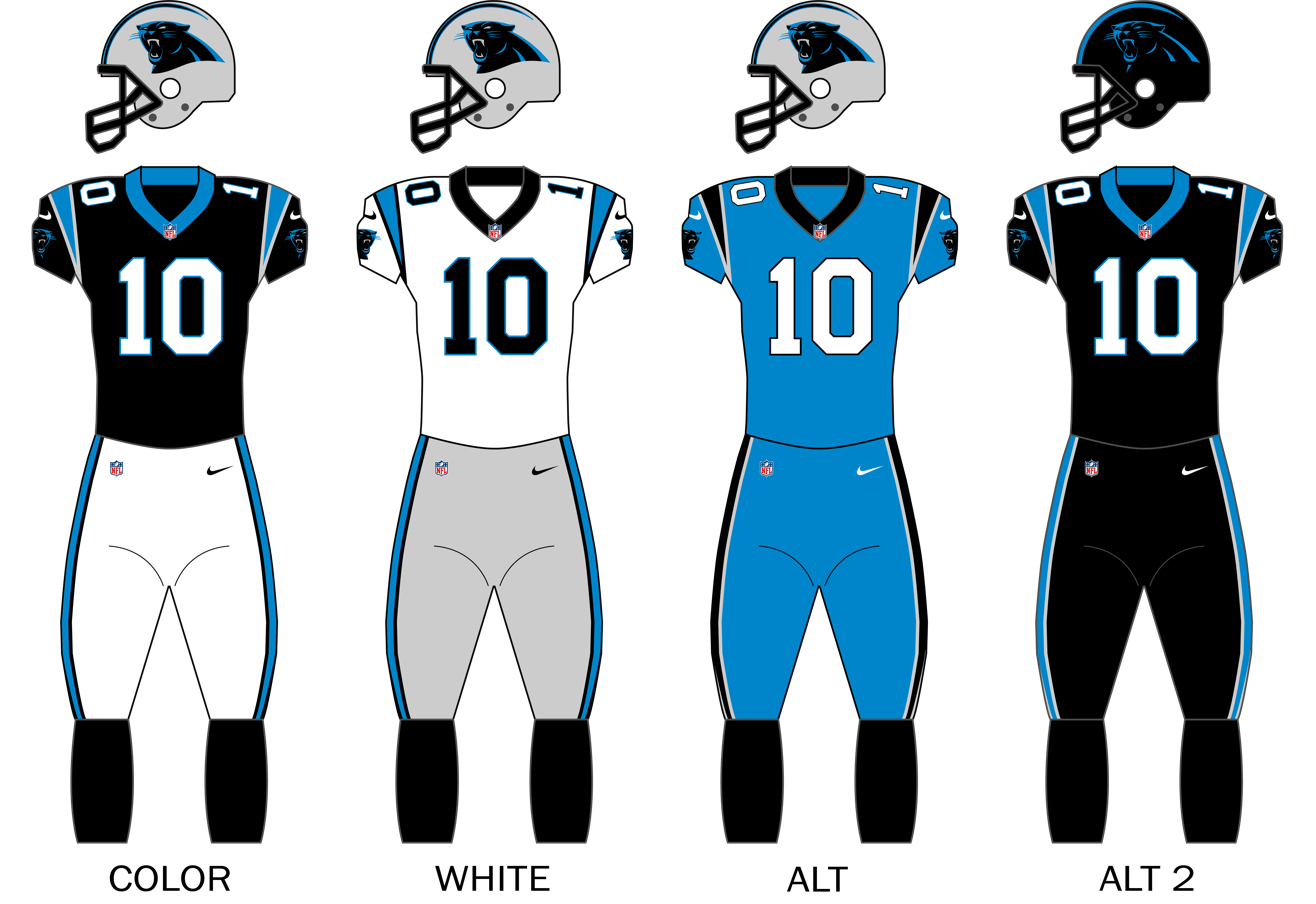

The 2023 season was the Carolina Panthers' 29th in the National Football League (NFL), their third and final under the leadership of general manager Scott Fitterer and their only under head coach Frank Reich. The Panthers started 0–6 for the first time since 1998. Following the team's Week 12 loss to the Tennessee Titans, not only did the Panthers fail to improve upon their 7–9 record from 2022, but they also fired Reich and named Chris Tabor as interim head coach. Reich's firing marks the third firing of a head coach in five years and the second firing in two years for the franchise. Following a Week 13 loss to the Tampa Bay Buccaneers, the Panthers were eliminated from playoff contention for the sixth consecutive season.

The team acquired the number one overall pick in the 2023 NFL draft from the Chicago Bears in a trade involving wide receiver D. J. Moore, which they used to draft Alabama quarterback Bryce Young. Young is the third quarterback drafted by the Panthers in the first round, following Kerry Collins in 1995, and Cam Newton in 2011 (also taken first overall). As a result of the deal, the Bears ended up getting the #1 overall pick from Carolina in the 2024 Draft, and selected quarterback Caleb Williams.

In Weeks 17 and 18, they were shut out by the Jacksonville Jaguars and the Tampa Bay Buccaneers, becoming the first team since the 2008 Cleveland Browns to be shutout in back-to-back games. They finished with an abysmal 2–15 record, the worst record in the league, and tying the 2001 team for most losses in a regular season. The Panthers dubiously failed to hold a fourth quarter lead in any game during the season, with both of their wins coming on game-winning field goals as time expired with the team trailing by 1 point beforehand.

The Carolina Panthers drew an average home attendance of 71,635 in 8 home games in the 2023 NFL season.

== Draft ==
2023 Carolina Panthers draft selection
Round	Selection	Player	Position	College	Notes
1	1	Bryce Young	QB	Alabama	From Bears (Note: The Panthers traded first- and second-round selections (9th and 61st overall), a 2024 first-round selection, a 2025 second-round selection and WR D. J. Moore to the Chicago Bears in exchange for a first-round selection (1st overall).)
1	9	Traded to the Chicago Bears			
2	39	Jonathan Mingo	WR	Ole Miss	
2	61	Traded to the Chicago Bears			From 49ers (Note: The Panthers traded RB Christian McCaffrey to the San Francisco 49ers in exchange for second-, third- and fourth-round selections (61st, 93rd and 132nd overall), and a 2024 fifth-round selection.)
3	76	Traded to the New England Patriots (Note: The Panthers traded a third-round selection (76th overall) and a 2022 fourth-round selection to the New England Patriots in exchange for a 2022 third-round selection.)			
3	80	D. J. Johnson	OLB	Oregon	From Steelers (Note: The Panthers traded third- and fourth-round selections (93rd and 132nd overall) to the Pittsburgh Steelers in exchange for a third-round selection (80th overall).)
3	93	Traded to the Pittsburgh Steelers			From 49ers
4	114	Chandler Zavala	G	NC State	
4	132	Traded to the Pittsburgh Steelers			From 49ers
5	145	Jammie Robinson	S	Florida State	
6	187	Traded to the New England Patriots (Note: The Panthers traded a sixth-round selection (187th overall) to the New England Patriots in exchange for CB Stephon Gilmore.)			
7	226	Traded to the Jacksonville Jaguars (Note: The Panthers traded a seventh-round selection (226th overall) and a 2024 sixth-round selection to the Jacksonville Jaguars in exchange for WR Laviska Shenault.)			

2023 Carolina Panthers undrafted free agents
Name	Position	College	Ref.
Austin Ajiake	MLB	UNLV	
Nico Bolden	S	Kent State	
J. D. DiRenzo	OT	Rutgers	
Ayinde "Ace" Eley	ILB	Georgia Tech	
Nash Jensen	G	North Dakota State	
Ricky Lee	OT	North Carolina A&T	
Eku Leota	OLB	Auburn	
Mark Milton	CB	Baylor	
Travez Moore	OLB	Arizona State	
Camerun Peoples	RB	Appalachian State	
Bumper Pool	MLB	Arkansas	
Jalen Redmond	DE	Oklahoma	
Colby Richardson	CB	LSU	
Josh Vann	WR	South Carolina	
Rejzohn Wright	CB	Oregon State	

Draft trades

== Staff ==
2023 Carolina Panthers staff
Front office: Owner – David Tepper; President – Kristi Coleman; General manager – Scott Fitterer; Assistant general manager – Dan Morgan; Vice president of football administration – Samir Suleiman; Vice president of player personnel – Adrian Wilson; Director of player personnel – Cole Spencer; Senior personnel executive – Jeff Morrow; Director of football operations – Mike Anderson; Director of college scouting – Jared Kirksey; Director of pro scouting – Rob Hanrahan; Assistant director of pro scouting – Tyler Ramsey; Director of football analytics – Taylor Rajack; Vice president of team development – Brian Decker; Head coaches: Head coach – Frank Reich; fired on November 27; Interim head coach/special teams coordinator – Chris Tabor; Assistant head coach/running backs – Duce Staley; fired on November 27; Offensive coaches: Offensive coordinator – Thomas Brown; Passing game coordinator – Parks Frazier; Quarterbacks – Josh McCown; fired on November 27; Wide receivers – Shawn Jefferson; Tight ends – John Lilly; Offensive line – James Campen; Assistant offensive line – Robert Kugler; Offensive assistant – Mike Bercovici; Offensive assistant – Jamel Mutunga; Offensive quality control/assistant to the head coach – Tyler Boyles	Defensive coaches: Defensive coordinator – Ejiro Evero; Defensive line – Todd Wash; Linebackers – Peter Hansen; Outside linebackers – Tem Lukabu; Secondary/cornerbacks – Jonathan Cooley; Safeties – Bert Watts; Assistant defensive backs – DeAngelo Hall; Senior defensive assistant – Dom Capers; Defensive assistant – Mayur Chaudhari; Defensive quality control – Bobby Maffei; Special teams coaches: Assistant special teams – Devin Fitzsimmons; Strength and conditioning: Head athletic trainer – Kevin King; Strength and conditioning – Jeremy Scott; Strength and conditioning assistant – Thomas Barbeau; Human performance assistant – Timothy Rabas

== Final roster ==
2023 Carolina Panthers roster
Quarterbacks (QB): 14 Andy Dalton; 9 Bryce Young; Running backs (RB): 3 Raheem Blackshear; 30 Chuba Hubbard; 6 Miles Sanders; Wide receivers (WR): 17 D. J. Chark; 88 Terrace Marshall Jr.; 11 Ihmir Smith-Marsette; 86 Mike Strachan; 19 Adam Thielen; Tight ends (TE): 84 Stephen Sullivan; 80 Ian Thomas; 82 Tommy Tremble	Offensive linemen (OL): 56 Bradley Bozeman C; 65 J. D. DiRenzo G; 79 Ikem Ekwonu T; 69 Gabe Jackson G; 66 Nash Jensen G; 61 Ricky Lee T; 73 Ilm Manning T; 68 Cade Mays G/C; 72 Taylor Moton T; 74 David Sharpe T; Defensive linemen (DL): 95 Derrick Brown DE; 93 LaBryan Ray DE; 91 Nick Thurman DE; 99 Shy Tuttle NT; 96 DeShawn Williams DE; 71 Chris Wormley DE	Linebackers (LB): 0 Brian Burns OLB; 58 Tae Davis ILB; 97 Yetur Gross-Matos OLB; 54 Kamu Grugier-Hill ILB; 98 Marquis Haynes OLB; 52 D. J. Johnson OLB; 40 Deion Jones ILB; 46 Eku Leota OLB; 49 Frankie Luvu ILB; Defensive backs (DB): 24 Vonn Bell FS; 21 Jeremy Chinn SS; 27 Alex Cook FS; 42 Sam Franklin Jr. SS/FS; 20 Shaquill Griffin CB; 23 C. J. Henderson CB; 13 Troy Hill CB; 8 Jaycee Horn CB; 26 Donte Jackson CB; 29 D'Shawn Jamison CB; 22 Jammie Robinson SS; 25 Xavier Woods SS; Special teams (ST): 10 Johnny Hekker P; 44 J. J. Jansen LS; 4 Eddy Piñeiro K	Practice squad: 34 Mike Boone RB; 77 Deonte Brown G; 41 Spencer Brown RB; 18 Jalen Camp WR; 33 Tarik Cohen RB; 43 Ace Eley ILB; 41 Matthias Farley FS; 31 Lamar Jackson CB; 85 Jordan Matthews WR; 37 A. J. Parker CB; 78 Jayden Peevy DE; 48 Chris Pierce TE; 87 Cam Sims WR; 76 Badara Traore T; 92 Raequan Williams DE; 83 Derek Wright WR (PS/I); 16 Matthew Wright K; Reserve: 94 Henry Anderson NT (IR); 90 Amaré Barno OLB (IR); 32 Dicaprio Bootle CB (IR); 53 Claudin Cherelus ILB (IR); 70 Brady Christensen G (IR); 63 Austin Corbett G (IR); 81 Hayden Hurst TE (IR); 67 Justin McCray G (IR); 15 Jonathan Mingo WR (IR); 45 Giovanni Ricci FB (IR); 5 Laviska Shenault WR (IR); 7 Shaq Thompson ILB (IR); 43 Luiji Vilain OLB (IR); 50 Chandler Wooten ILB (IR); 62 Chandler Zavala G (IR); Rookies in italics 53 active, 15 reserve, 16 practice squad (1 exempt)

== Preseason ==
The Panthers' preseason opponents and schedule was announced in the spring.

Week	Date	Opponent	Result	Record	Venue	Recap
1	August 12	New York Jets	L 0–27	0–1	Bank of America Stadium	Recap
2	August 18	at New York Giants	L 19–21	0–2	MetLife Stadium	Recap
3	August 25	Detroit Lions	L 17–26	0–3	Bank of America Stadium	Recap

== Regular season ==
=== Schedule ===
Week	Date	Opponent	Result	Record	Venue	Recap
1	September 10	at **Atlanta Falcons**	**L** 10–24	0–1	Mercedes-Benz Stadium	Recap
2	September 18	**New Orleans Saints**	**L** 17–20	0–2	Bank of America Stadium	Recap
3	September 24	at Seattle Seahawks	**L** 27–37	0–3	Lumen Field	Recap
4	October 1	Minnesota Vikings	**L** 13–21	0–4	Bank of America Stadium	Recap
5	October 8	at Detroit Lions	**L** 24–42	0–5	Ford Field	Recap
6	October 15	at Miami Dolphins	**L** 21–42	0–6	Hard Rock Stadium	Recap
7	Bye					
8	October 29	Houston Texans	**W** 15–13	1–6	Bank of America Stadium	Recap
9	November 5	Indianapolis Colts	**L** 13–27	1–7	Bank of America Stadium	Recap
10	November 9	at Chicago Bears	**L** 13–16	1–8	Soldier Field	Recap
11	November 19	Dallas Cowboys	**L** 10–33	1–9	Bank of America Stadium	Recap
12	November 26	at Tennessee Titans	**L** 10–17	1–10	Nissan Stadium	Recap
13	December 3	at **Tampa Bay Buccaneers**	**L** 18–21	1–11	Raymond James Stadium	Recap
14	December 10	at **New Orleans Saints**	**L** 6–28	1–12	Caesars Superdome	Recap
15	December 17	**Atlanta Falcons**	**W** 9–7	2–12	Bank of America Stadium	Recap
16	December 24	Green Bay Packers	**L** 30–33	2–13	Bank of America Stadium	Recap
17	December 31	at Jacksonville Jaguars	**L** 0–26	2–14	EverBank Stadium	Recap
18	January 7	**Tampa Bay Buccaneers**	**L** 0–9	2–15	Bank of America Stadium	Recap

Note: Intra-division opponents are in bold text.

=== Game summaries ===
==== Week 1: at Atlanta Falcons ====
Week 1: Carolina Panthers at Atlanta Falcons – Game summary

Quarter	1	2	3	4	Total
Panthers	0	7	3	0	**10**
**Falcons**	0	7	3	14	**24**

at Mercedes-Benz Stadium, Atlanta, Georgia

- Date: September 10
- Game time: 1:00 p.m. EDT
- Game weather: None (retractable roof closed)
- Game attendance: 69,597
- Referee: Brad Rogers
- TV announcers (Fox): Chris Myers, Robert Smith and Jen Hale
- Recap, Game Book

Game information

**First quarter**

- No scoring plays.

**Second quarter**

- ATL – Bijan Robinson 11-yard pass from Desmond Ridder (Younghoe Koo kick), 14:54. Falcons 7–0. **Drive: 3 plays, 17 yards, 1:07.**
- CAR – Hayden Hurst 4-yard pass from Bryce Young (Eddy Piñeiro kick), 5:09. Tied 7–7. **Drive: 12 plays, 75 yards, 7:18.**

**Third quarter**

- CAR – Eddy Piñeiro 43-yard field goal, 10:46. Panthers 10–7. **Drive: 9 plays, 50 yards, 4:14.**
- ATL – Younghoe Koo 49-yard field goal, 4:52. Tied 10–10. **Drive: 4 plays, 5 yards, 1:46.**

**Fourth quarter**

- ATL – Tyler Allgeier 3-yard run (Younghoe Koo kick), 14:12. Falcons 17–10. **Drive: 7 plays, 61 yards, 3:12.**
- ATL – Tyler Allgeier 3-yard run (Younghoe Koo kick), 4:48. Falcons 24–10. **Drive: 6 plays, 56 yards, 2:21.**

**Top passers**

- CAR – Bryce Young – 20/38, 146 yards, TD, 2 INT
- ATL – Desmond Ridder – 15/18, 115 yards, TD

**Top rushers**

- CAR – Miles Sanders – 18 rushes, 72 yards
- ATL – Tyler Allgeier – 15 rushes, 75 yards, 2 TD

**Top receivers**

- CAR – Hayden Hurst – 5 receptions, 41 yards
- ATL – Mack Hollins – 3 receptions, 31 yards

In the Panthers' opening drive, they came close to scoring, but when they went for it on the fourth down, Atlanta stopped them. On their next drive, after two penalties, rookie Bryce Young's pass was intercepted by the Falcons' Jessie Bates. The Falcons scored first when a Desmond Ridder to Bijan Robinson 11-yard pass resulted in a touchdown. Carolina got the ball back, and Young passed it to Hayden Hurst for 4 yards, who tied the game at 7–7. The Panthers only scored three points in the second half during an Eddy Piñeiro 43-yard field goal, while Atlanta scored 17, including two Tyler Allgeier touchdowns. Carolina lost the game in an embarrassing 10–24 and started the season 0–1.

==== Week 2: vs. New Orleans Saints ====
Week 2: New Orleans Saints at Carolina Panthers – Game summary

Quarter	1	2	3	4	Total
**Saints**	3	3	7	7	**20**
Panthers	3	0	3	11	**17**

at Bank of America Stadium, Charlotte, North Carolina

- Date: September 18
- Game time: 7:15 p.m. EDT
- Game weather: Partly cloudy, 81 °F (27 °C)
- Game attendance: 72,709
- Referee: Scott Novak
- TV announcers (WAXN/ESPN): Chris Fowler, Louis Riddick, Dan Orlovsky, and Laura Rutledge
- Recap, Game Book

Game information

**First quarter**

- CAR – Eddy Piñeiro 52-yard field goal, 7:04. Panthers 3–0. **Drive: 9 plays, 31 yards, 4:53.**
- NO – Blake Grupe 28-yard field goal, 0:36. Tied 3–3. **Drive: 15 plays, 65 yards, 6:28.**

**Second quarter**

- NO – Blake Grupe 23-yard field goal, 9:52. Saints 6–3. **Drive: 12 plays, 51 yards, 4:23.**

**Third quarter**

- CAR – Eddy Piñeiro 54-yard field goal, 9:09. Tied 6–6. **Drive: 4 plays, 5 yards, 1:16.**
- NO – Tony Jones Jr. 2-yard rush (Blake Grupe kick), 2:56. Saints 13–6. **Drive: 10 plays, 75 yards, 6:14.**

**Fourth quarter**

- CAR – Eddy Piñeiro 36-yard field goal, 5:30. Saints 13–9. **Drive: 11 plays, 62 yards, 7:17.**
- NO – Tony Jones Jr. 2-yard rush (Blake Grupe kick), 3:14. Saints 20–9. **Drive: 6 plays, 79 yards, 2:16.**
- CAR – Adam Thielen 2-yard pass from Bryce Young (Bryce Young–Adam Thielen pass), 3:14. Saints 20–17. **Drive: 11 plays, 75 yards, 1:58.**

**Top passers**

- NO – Derek Carr – 21/36, 228 yards, INT
- CAR – Bryce Young – 22/33, 153 yards, TD

**Top rushers**

- NO – Taysom Hill – 9 rushes, 75 yards
- CAR – Miles Sanders – 14 rushes, 43 yards

**Top receivers**

- NO – Chris Olave – 6 receptions, 86 yards
- CAR – Adam Thielen – 7 receptions, 54 yards, TD

In the Panthers' home opener, both Carolina and New Orleans scored a field goal in the first quarter. In the second, the Saints scored another field goal. Later, Vonn Bell intercepted the ball from Derek Carr. As the Panthers approach the end zone, Bryce Young is sacked, and the ball is knocked out of his hands. New Orleans recovers the ball. Carolina ties it in the third. The Saints follow with a touchdown. In the fourth, the Panthers kicked another field goal. With 3:14 to go, New Orleans scores a touchdown. The Panthers try to come back at the end with a touchdown and two-point conversion, but it was not enough. The Saints beat the Panthers 20–17, and Carolina starts off the season 0–2. This loss gave the Panthers their fourth 0–2 start in five seasons.

==== Week 3: at Seattle Seahawks ====
Week 3: Carolina Panthers at Seattle Seahawks – Game summary

Quarter	1	2	3	4	Total
Panthers	3	10	0	14	**27**
**Seahawks**	3	9	10	15	**37**

at Lumen Field, Seattle, Washington

- Date: September 24
- Game time: 4:05 p.m. EDT/1:05 p.m. PDT
- Game weather: Cloudy, 61 °F (16 °C)
- Game attendance: 68,699
- Referee: Ronald Torbert
- TV announcers (CBS): Ian Eagle, Charles Davis and Evan Washburn
- Recap, Game Book

Game information

**First quarter**

- CAR – Eddy Piñeiro 47-yard field goal, 7:47. Panthers 3–0. **Drive: 11 plays, 50 yards, 5:38.**
- SEA – Jason Myers 43-yard field goal, 3:33. Tied 3–3. **Drive: 10 plays, 50 yards, 4:14.**

**Second quarter**

- SEA – Jason Myers 35-yard field goal, 12:07. Seahawks 6–3. **Drive: 8 plays, 64 yards, 4:03.**
- SEA – Jason Myers 33-yard field goal, 8:45. Seahawks 9–3. **Drive: 6 plays, 46 yards, 2:00.**
- CAR – D. J. Chark 47-yard pass from Andy Dalton (Eddy Piñeiro kick), 4:54. Panthers 10–9. **Drive: 8 plays, 75 yards, 3:51.**
- CAR – Eddy Piñeiro 44-yard field goal, 2:39. Panthers 13–9. **Drive: 4 plays, 2 yards, 1:37.**
- SEA – Jason Myers 37-yard field goal, 0:44. Panthers 13–12. **Drive: 11 plays, 54 yards, 1:55.**

**Third quarter**

- SEA – Jason Myers 39-yard field goal, 9:45. Seahawks 15–13. **Drive: 9 plays, 55 yards, 4:08.**
- SEA – Kenneth Walker III 1-yard run (Jason Myers kick), 3:52. Seahawks 22–13. **Drive: 8 plays, 55 yards, 4:17.**

**Fourth quarter**

- CAR – Miles Sanders 1-yard run (Eddy Piñeiro kick), 14:55. Seahawks 22–20. **Drive: 9 plays, 75 yards, 3:57.**
- SEA – Kenneth Walker III 7-yard run (Jason Myers kick), 11:40. Seahawks 29–20. **Drive: 6 plays, 69 yards, 3:15.**
- SEA – Jake Bobo 5-yard pass from Geno Smith (Geno Smith-Tyler Lockett pass), 4:17. Seahawks 37–20. **Drive: 5 plays, 27 yards, 0:30.**
- CAR – Adam Thielen 15-yard pass from Andy Dalton (Eddy Piñeiro kick), 1:40. Seahawks 37–27. **Drive: 11 plays, 75 yards, 2:37.**

**Top passers**

- CAR – Andy Dalton – 34/58, 361 yards, 2 TD
- SEA – Geno Smith – 23/36, 296 yards, TD, INT

**Top rushers**

- CAR – Miles Sanders – 9 rushes, 24 yards, TD
- SEA – Kenneth Walker III – 18 rushes, 97 yards, 2 TD

**Top receivers**

- CAR – Adam Thielen – 11 receptions, 145 yards, TD
- SEA – DK Metcalf – 6 receptions, 112 yards

==== Week 4: vs. Minnesota Vikings ====
Week 4: Minnesota Vikings at Carolina Panthers – Game summary

Quarter	1	2	3	4	Total
**Vikings**	0	7	14	0	**21**
Panthers	7	6	0	0	**13**

at Bank of America Stadium, Charlotte, North Carolina

- Date: October 1
- Game time: 1:00 p.m. EDT
- Game weather: Sunny, 80 °F (27 °C)
- Game attendance: 72,842
- Referee: Tra Blake
- TV announcers (Fox): Alex Faust, Brady Quinn and Megan Olivi
- Recap, Game Book

Game information

**First quarter**

- CAR – Sam Franklin 99-yard interception return (Eddy Piñeiro kick), 10:27. Panthers 7–0.

**Second quarter**

- CAR – Eddy Piñeiro 26-yard field goal, 14:56. Panthers 10–0. **Drive: 15 plays, 61 yards, 8:26.**
- MIN – Justin Jefferson 4-yard pass from Kirk Cousins (Greg Joseph kick), 9:43. Panthers 10–7. **Drive: 10 plays, 64 yards, 5:13.**
- CAR – Eddy Piñeiro 56-yard field goal, 0:00. Panthers 13–7. **Drive: 4 plays, 18 yards, 0:34.**

**Third quarter**

- MIN – D. J. Wonnum 51-yard fumble return (Greg Joseph kick), 3:58. Vikings 14–13.
- MIN – Justin Jefferson 30-yard pass from Kirk Cousins (Greg Joseph kick), 0:00. Vikings 21–13. **Drive: 4 plays, 56 yards, 1:44.**

**Fourth quarter**

- No scoring plays.

**Top passers**

- MIN – Kirk Cousins – 12/19, 139 yards, 2 TD, 2 INT
- CAR – Bryce Young – 25/32, 204 yards

**Top rushers**

- MIN – Alexander Mattison – 17 rushes, 95 yards
- CAR – Chuba Hubbard – 14 rushes, 41 yards

**Top receivers**

- MIN – Justin Jefferson – 6 receptions, 85 yards, 2 TD
- CAR – Adam Thielen – 7 receptions, 76 yards

On the Vikings' opening drive, as they were about to score, Sam Franklin intercepted the ball and scored a 99-yard pick-six. In the beginning of the second, Eddy Piñeiro made a field goal, giving Carolina a 10–0 lead. Minnesota decreased the lead with a Justin Jefferson touchdown. At the end of the half, Kirk Cousins threw another interception to Carolina's Kamu Grugier-Hill. Piñeiro made another field goal, giving Carolina a 13–7 lead at the half. In the third, Bryce Young lost the ball on a strip sack and Minnesota's D.J. Wonnum recovered the fumble and returned it for a touchdown, giving the Vikings a one-point lead. The Vikings would add another touchdown on a 30-yard pass from Cousins to Jefferson, and Minnesota's defense held on in the fourth quarter to secure a 21–13 victory.

With the loss, Carolina dropped to 0–4.

==== Week 5: at Detroit Lions ====
Week 5: Carolina Panthers at Detroit Lions – Game summary

Quarter	1	2	3	4	Total
Panthers	0	10	0	14	**24**
**Lions**	14	14	0	14	**42**

at Ford Field, Detroit, Michigan

- Date: October 8
- Game time: 1:00 p.m. EDT
- Game weather: None (indoor stadium)
- Game attendance: 63,648
- Referee: Adrian Hill
- TV announcers (Fox): Chris Myers, Daryl Johnston and Pam Oliver
- Recap, Game Book

Game information

**First quarter**

- DET – David Montgomery 42-yard run (Riley Patterson kick), 9:41. Lions 7–0. **Drive: 3 plays, 81 yards, 1:17.**
- DET – Sam LaPorta 4-yard pass from Jared Goff (Riley Patterson kick), 4:53. Lions 14–0. **Drive: 5 plays, 20 yards, 2:35.**

**Second quarter**

- CAR – Tommy Tremble 1-yard pass from Bryce Young (Eddy Piñeiro kick), 12:48. Lions 14–7. **Drive: 14 plays, 75 yards, 7:05.**
- DET – Josh Reynolds 1-yard pass from Jared Goff (Riley Patterson kick), 3:50. Lions 21–7. **Drive: 10 plays, 38 yards, 6:08.**
- DET – Sam LaPorta 31-yard pass from Jared Goff (Riley Patterson kick), 3:21. Lions 28–7. **Drive: 1 play, 31 yards, 0:08.**
- CAR – Eddy Piñeiro 33-yard field goal, 0:06. Lions 28–10. **Drive: 9 plays, 53 yards, 3:15.**

**Third quarter**

- No scoring plays.

**Fourth quarter**

- DET – Jared Goff 1-yard run (Riley Patterson kick), 14:45. Lions 35–10. **Drive: 8 plays, 51 yards, 4:33.**
- CAR – D. J. Chark 18-yard pass from Bryce Young (Eddy Piñeiro kick), 11:52. Lions 35–17. **Drive: 7 plays, 75 yards, 3:06.**
- DET – Craig Reynolds 5-yard run (Riley Patterson kick), 7:27. Lions 42–17. **Drive: 7 plays, 75 yards, 4:25.**
- CAR – Adam Thielen 1-yard pass from Bryce Young (Eddy Piñeiro kick), 1:55. Lions 42–24. **Drive: 13 plays, 75 yards, 5:32.**

**Top passers**

- CAR – Bryce Young – 25/41, 247 yards, 3 TD, 2 INT
- DET – Jared Goff – 20/28, 236 yards, 3 TD

**Top rushers**

- CAR – Chuba Hubbard – 9 rushes, 35 yards
- DET – David Montgomery – 19 rushes, 109 yards, TD

**Top receivers**

- CAR – Adam Thielen – 11 receptions, 107 yards, TD
- DET – Josh Reynolds – 4 receptions, 76 yards, TD

==== Week 6: at Miami Dolphins ====
Week 6: Carolina Panthers at Miami Dolphins – Game summary

Quarter	1	2	3	4	Total
Panthers	14	0	0	7	**21**
**Dolphins**	0	21	7	14	**42**

at Hard Rock Stadium, Miami Gardens, Florida

- Date: October 15
- Game time: 1:00 p.m. EDT
- Game weather: Sunny, 87 °F (31 °C)
- Game attendance: 65,529
- Referee: Craig Wrolstad
- TV announcers (CBS): Kevin Harlan, Trent Green and Melanie Collins
- Recap, Game Book

Game information

**First quarter**

- CAR – Chuba Hubbard 6-yard run (Eddy Piñeiro kick), 7:13. Panthers 7–0. **Drive: 7 plays, 64 yards, 3:47.**
- CAR – Adam Thielen 8-yard pass from Bryce Young (Eddy Piñeiro kick), 0:06. Panthers 14–0. **Drive: 10 plays, 74 yards, 5:21.**

**Second quarter**

- MIA – Raheem Mostert 3-yard pass from Tua Tagovailoa (Jason Sanders kick), 11:13. Panthers 14–7. **Drive: 9 plays, 75 yards, 3:53.**
- MIA – Jaylen Waddle 4-yard pass from Tua Tagovailoa (Jason Sanders kick), 7:00. Tied 14–14. **Drive: 3 plays, 57 yards, 1:20.**
- MIA – Tyreek Hill 41-yard pass from Tua Tagovailoa (Jason Sanders kick), 1:54. Dolphins 21–14. **Drive: 9 plays, 72 yards, 3:07.**

**Third quarter**

- MIA – Raheem Mostert 4-yard run (Jason Sanders kick), 6:21. Dolphins 28–14. **Drive: 8 plays, 91 yards, 5:11.**
- MIA – Raheem Mostert 1-yard run (Jason Sanders kick), 12:23. Dolphins 35–14. **Drive: 12 plays, 76 yards, 5:05.**
- CAR – Troy Hill 61-yard interception return (Eddy Piñeiro kick), 4:26. Dolphins 35–21.

**Fourth quarter**

- MIA – Salvon Ahmed 9-yard run (Jason Sanders kick), 2:31. Dolphins 42–21. **Drive: 5 plays, 37 yards, 1:55.**

**Top passers**

- CAR – Bryce Young – 23/38, 217 yards, TD
- MIA – Tua Tagovailoa – 21/31, 262 yards, 3 TD

**Top rushers**

- CAR – Chuba Hubbard – 19 rushes, 88 yards, TD
- MIA – Raheem Mostert – 17 rushes, 115 yards, 2 TD

**Top receivers**

- CAR – Adam Thielen – 11 receptions, 115 yards, TD
- MIA – Tyreek Hill – 6 receptions, 163 yards, TD

==== Week 8: vs. Houston Texans ====
Week 8: Houston Texans at Carolina Panthers – Game summary

Quarter	1	2	3	4	Total
Texans	0	7	6	0	**13**
**Panthers**	0	6	6	3	**15**

at Bank of America Stadium, Charlotte, North Carolina

- Date: October 29
- Game time: 1:00 p.m. EDT
- Game weather: Clear, 76 °F (24 °C)
- Game attendance: 71,505
- Referee: John Hussey
- TV announcers (Fox): Brandon Gaudin, Robert Smith and Jen Hale
- Recap, Game Book

Game information

**First quarter**

- No scoring plays.

**Second quarter**

- HOU – Andrew Beck 1-yard run (Kaʻimi Fairbairn kick), 13:13. Texans 7–0. **Drive: 17 plays, 92 yards, 9:20.**
- CAR – Tommy Tremble 1-yard pass from Bryce Young (kick failed), 1:35. Texans 7–6. **Drive: 9 plays, 60 yards, 3:18.**

**Third quarter**

- CAR – Eddy Piñeiro 46-yard field goal, 10:46. Panthers 9–7. **Drive: 9 plays, 49 yards, 4:14.**
- CAR – Eddy Piñeiro 37-yard field goal, 7:58. Panthers 12–7. **Drive: 4 plays, 8 yards, 1:57.**
- HOU – C. J. Stroud 1-yard run (pass failed), 0:35. Texans 13–12. **Drive: 12 plays, 75 yards, 7:23.**

**Fourth quarter**

- CAR – Eddy Piñeiro 23-yard field goal, 0:00. Panthers 15–13. **Drive: 15 plays, 86 yards, 6:17.**

**Top passers**

- HOU – C. J. Stroud – 16/24, 140 yards
- CAR – Bryce Young – 22/31, 235 yards, TD

**Top rushers**

- HOU – Dameon Pierce – 12 rushes, 46 yards
- CAR – Chuba Hubbard – 15 rushes, 28 yards

**Top receivers**

- HOU – Nico Collins – 4 receptions, 30 yards
- CAR – Adam Thielen – 8 receptions, 72 yards

It was a scoreless first quarter for both Carolina and Houston. In the second quarter, Houston scored with a touchdown. With less than two minutes to go in the half, Bryce Young passes it to Tommy Tremble for a touchdown but the PAT is no good. Early in the third, Eddy Piñeiro kicked a field goal giving the Panthers a two-point lead. Houston fumbles the ball and it is recovered by the Panthers. Piñeiro makes another field goal. Texans follow with a touchdown but the attempt for a two-point conversion is no good. With three seconds to go in the game, Piñeiro kicks the game winning field goal and Panthers win 15–13. They improve to 1–6.

==== Week 9: vs. Indianapolis Colts ====
Week 9: Indianapolis Colts at Carolina Panthers – Game summary

Quarter	1	2	3	4	Total
**Colts**	0	20	0	7	**27**
Panthers	0	3	7	3	**13**

at Bank of America Stadium, Charlotte, North Carolina

- Date: November 5
- Game time: 4:05 p.m. EST
- Game weather: Clear, 75 °F (24 °C)
- Game attendance: 72,301
- Referee: Bill Vinovich
- TV announcers (CBS): Kevin Harlan, Trent Green and Melanie Collins
- Recap, Game Book

Game information

**First quarter**

- No scoring plays.

**Second quarter**

- IND – Matt Gay 26-yard field goal, 13:52. Colts 3–0. **Drive: 15 plays, 75 yards, 7:19.**
- IND – Jonathan Taylor 10-yard pass from Gardner Minshew (Matt Gay kick), 7:43. Colts 10–0. **Drive: 9 plays, 64 yards, 4:29.**
- CAR – Eddy Pineiro 35-yard field goal, 3:34. Colts 10–3. **Drive: 9 plays, 39 yards, 4:09.**
- IND – Matt Gay 57-yard field goal, 0:53. Colts 13–3. **Drive: 11 plays, 36 yards, 2:41.**
- IND – Kenny Moore II 49-yard interception return (Matt Gay kick), 0:20. Colts 20–3.

**Third quarter**

- CAR – DJ Chark Jr. 5-yard pass from Bryce Young (Eddy Pineiro kick), 4:34. Colts 20–10. **Drive: 15 plays, 77 yards, 7:55.**

**Fourth quarter**

- IND – Kenny Moore II 66-yard interception return (Matt Gay kick), 13:40. Colts 27–10.
- CAR – Eddy Pineiro 49-yard field goal, 8:09. Colts 27–13. **Drive: 14 plays, 44 yards, 5:31.**

**Top passers**

- IND – Gardner Minshew – 17/26, 127 yards, TD
- CAR – Bryce Young – 24/39, 173 yards, TD, 3 INT

**Top rushers**

- IND – Jonathan Taylor – 18 rushes, 47 yards
- CAR – Chuba Hubbard – 16 rushes, 58 yards

**Top receivers**

- IND – Michael Pittman Jr. – 8 receptions, 64 yards
- CAR – Hayden Hurst – 2 receptions, 54 yards

==== Week 10: at Chicago Bears ====
Week 10: Carolina Panthers at Chicago Bears – Game summary

Quarter	1	2	3	4	Total
Panthers	7	3	0	3	**13**
**Bears**	3	6	7	0	**16**

at Soldier Field, Chicago, Illinois

- Date: November 9
- Game time: 8:15 p.m. EST/7:15 p.m. CST
- Game weather: Clear, 51 °F (11 °C)
- Game attendance: 61,200
- Referee: Clete Blakeman
- TV announcers (WSOC/Prime Video): Al Michaels, Kirk Herbstreit and Kaylee Hartung
- Recap, Game Book

Game information

**First quarter**

- CAR – Ihmir Smith-Marsette 79-yard punt return (Eddy Piñeiro kick), 5:46. Panthers 7–0.
- CHI – Cairo Santos 54-yard field goal, 2:29. Panthers 7–3. **Drive: 8 plays, 39 yards, 3:17.**

**Second quarter**

- CAR – Eddy Piñeiro 33-yard field goal, 13:33. Panthers 10–3. **Drive: 8 plays, 60 yards, 3:56.**
- CHI – Cairo Santos 36-yard field goal, 3:06. Panthers 10–6. **Drive: 11 plays, 35 yards, 5:13.**
- CHI – Cairo Santos 39-yard field goal, 0:00. Panthers 10–9. **Drive: 9 plays, 70 yards, 1:12.**

**Third quarter**

- CHI – D'Onta Foreman 4-yard run (Cairo Santos kick), 6:33. Bears 16–10. **Drive: 9 plays, 38 yards, 3:56.**

**Fourth quarter**

- CAR – Eddy Piñeiro 39-yard field goal, 11:06. Bears 16–13. **Drive: 8 plays, 20 yards, 4:42.**

**Top passers**

- CAR – Bryce Young – 21/38, 185 yards
- CHI – Tyson Bagent – 20/33, 162 yards

**Top rushers**

- CAR – Chuba Hubbard – 9 rushes, 23 yards
- CHI – D'Onta Foreman – 21 rushes, 80 yards, TD

**Top receivers**

- CAR – Adam Thielen – 6 receptions, 42 yards
- CHI – D. J. Moore – 5 receptions, 58 yards

In Carolina's second drive of the game, Ihmir Smith-Marsette scores a 79-yard punt return touchdown. Chicago follows with a field goal. At the top of the second, Eddy Piñeiro kicks a field goal. The Bears scored at the end of the second, giving Carolina a 10–9 lead at the half. Chicago is the first to score in the second half with a touchdown by former Panther, D'Onta Foreman. Panthers kick another field goal early in the fourth. The Bears defeat Carolina 16–13, and the Panthers fall to 1–8.

==== Week 11: vs. Dallas Cowboys ====
Week 11: Dallas Cowboys at Carolina Panthers – Game summary

Quarter	1	2	3	4	Total
**Cowboys**	7	10	0	16	**33**
Panthers	0	3	7	0	**10**

at Bank of America Stadium, Charlotte, North Carolina

- Date: November 19
- Game time: 1:00 p.m. EST
- Game weather: Sunny, 65 °F (18 °C)
- Game attendance: 73,543
- Referee: Clay Martin
- TV announcers (Fox): Kevin Burkhardt, Greg Olsen, Erin Andrews and Tom Rinaldi
- Recap, Game Book

Game information

**First quarter**

- DAL – Luke Schoonmaker 18-yard pass from Dak Prescott (Brandon Aubrey kick), 3:20. Cowboys 7–0. **Drive: 10 plays, 83 yards, 4:59.**

**Second quarter**

- DAL – Brandon Aubrey 30-yard field goal, 11:01. Cowboys 10–0. **Drive: 12 plays, 69 yards, 5:09.**
- CAR – Eddy Piñeiro 42-yard field goal, 1:56. Cowboys 10–3. **Drive: 10 plays, 50 yards, 4:54.**
- DAL – CeeDee Lamb 5-yard pass from Dak Prescott (Brandon Aubrey kick), 0:24. Cowboys 17–3. **Drive: 11 plays, 60 yards, 1:32.**

**Third quarter**

- CAR – Tommy Tremble 4-yard pass from Bryce Young (Eddy Piñeiro kick), 1:59. Cowboys 17–10. **Drive: 17 plays, 70 yards, 8:58.**

**Fourth quarter**

- DAL – Tony Pollard 21-yard run (Brandon Aubrey kick), 13:58. Cowboys 24–10. **Drive: 8 plays, 75 yards, 3:01.**
- DAL – DaRon Bland 30-yard interception return (kick failed), 13:48. Cowboys 30–10.
- DAL – Brandon Aubrey 27-yard field goal, 7:18. Cowboys 33–10. **Drive: 7 plays, 18 yards, 4:00.**

**Top passers**

- DAL – Dak Prescott – 25/38, 189 yards, 2 TD
- CAR – Bryce Young – 16/29, 123 yards, TD, INT

**Top rushers**

- DAL – Tony Pollard – 12 rushes, 61 yards, TD
- CAR – Chuba Hubbard – 10 rushes, 57 yards

**Top receivers**

- DAL – CeeDee Lamb – 6 receptions, 38 yards, TD
- CAR – Adam Thielen – 8 receptions, 74 yards

==== Week 12: at Tennessee Titans ====
Week 12: Carolina Panthers at Tennessee Titans – Game summary

Quarter	1	2	3	4	Total
Panthers	0	3	7	0	**10**
**Titans**	7	10	0	0	**17**

at Nissan Stadium, Nashville, Tennessee

- Date: November 26
- Game time: 1:00 p.m. EST/12:00 p.m. CST
- Game weather: Cloudy, 51 °F (11 °C)
- Game attendance: 62,493
- Referee: Ronald Torbert
- TV announcers (Fox): Adam Amin, Mark Schlereth and Kristina Pink
- Recap, Game Book

Game information

**First quarter**

- TEN – Derrick Henry 1-yard run (Nick Folk kick), 0:34. Titans 7–0. **Drive: 15 plays, 91 yards, 9:36.**

**Second quarter**

- CAR – Eddy Piñeiro 50-yard field goal, 8:51. Titans 7–3. **Drive: 14 plays, 47 yards, 6:43.**
- TEN – Derrick Henry 10-yard run (Nick Folk kick), 2:27. Titans 14–3. **Drive: 2 plays, 15 yards, 0:39.**
- TEN – Nick Folk 53-yard field goal, 0:53. Titans 17–3. **Drive: 5 plays, 27 yards, 0:28.**

**Third quarter**

- CAR – Chuba Hubbard 5-yard run (Eddy Piñeiro kick), 8:06. Titans 17–10. **Drive: 11 plays, 67 yards, 6:54.**

**Fourth quarter**

- No scoring plays.

**Top passers**

- CAR – Bryce Young – 18/31, 194 yards
- TEN – Will Levis – 18/28, 185 yards

**Top rushers**

- CAR – Chuba Hubbard – 14 rushes, 45 yards, TD
- TEN – Derrick Henry – 18 rushes, 76 yards, 2 TD

**Top receivers**

- CAR – Chuba Hubbard – 5 receptions, 47 yards
- TEN – Chig Okonkwo – 4 receptions, 45 yards

This turned out to be Frank Reich's last game as head coach of the Panthers, as he was fired the next day after this loss. Also shortly after the game, general manager David Tepper was heard shouting an f-bomb as he was leaving the Panthers locker room.

==== Week 13: at Tampa Bay Buccaneers ====
Week 13: Carolina Panthers at Tampa Bay Buccaneers – Game summary

Quarter	1	2	3	4	Total
Panthers	0	3	7	8	**18**
**Buccaneers**	7	0	7	7	**21**

at Raymond James Stadium, Tampa, Florida

- Date: December 3
- Game time: 4:05 p.m. EST
- Game weather: Cloudy, 81 °F (27 °C)
- Game attendance: 62,432
- Referee: Brad Rogers
- TV announcers (CBS): Tom McCarthy, James Lofton, Jay Feely and Tiffany Blackmon
- Recap, Game Book

Game information

**First quarter**

- TB – Rachaad White 1-yard run (Chase McLaughlin kick), 6:08. Buccaneers 7–0. **Drive: 8 plays, 57 yards, 3:26.**

**Second quarter**

- CAR – Eddy Piñeiro 23-yard field goal, 13:30. Buccaneers 7–3. **Drive: 14 plays, 70 yards, 7:38.**

**Third quarter**

- CAR – Chuba Hubbard 1-yard run (Eddy Piñeiro kick), 5:04. Panthers 10–7. **Drive: 7 plays, 65 yards, 3:36.**
- TB – Mike Evans 75-yard pass from Baker Mayfield (Chase McLaughlin kick), 4:54. Buccaneers 14–10. **Drive: 1 play, 75 yards, 0:10.**

**Fourth quarter**

- TB – Chris Godwin 19-yard run (Chase McLaughlin kick), 11:36. Buccaneers 21–10. **Drive: 7 plays, 67 yards, 4:05.**
- CAR – Chuba Hubbard 1-yard run (Bryce Young run), 5:02. Buccaneers 21–18. **Drive: 11 plays, 75 yards, 6:34.**

**Top passers**

- CAR – Bryce Young – 15/31, 178 yards, TD
- TB – Baker Mayfield – 14/29, 202 yards, TD, INT

**Top rushers**

- CAR – Chuba Hubbard – 25 rushes, 104 yards, 2 TD
- TB – Rachaad White – 20 rushes, 84 yards, TD

**Top receivers**

- CAR – Jonathan Mingo – 6 receptions, 69 yards
- TB – Mike Evans – 7 receptions, 162 yards, TD

With a 21–18 loss to the Tampa Bay Buccaneers, the Panthers were eliminated from playoff contention.

==== Week 14: at New Orleans Saints ====
Week 14: Carolina Panthers at New Orleans Saints – Game summary

Quarter	1	2	3	4	Total
Panthers	0	3	3	0	**6**
**Saints**	0	14	0	14	**28**

at Caesars Superdome, New Orleans, Louisiana

- Date: December 10
- Game time: 1:00 p.m. EST/12:00 p.m. CST
- Game weather: None (indoor stadium)
- Game attendance: 70,009
- Referee: Alan Eck
- TV announcers (Fox): Kenny Albert, Jonathan Vilma and Shannon Spake
- Recap, Game Book

Game information

**First quarter**

- No scoring plays.

**Second quarter**

- NO – Alvin Kamara 9-yard run (Blake Grupe kick), 14:55. Saints 7–0. **Drive: 6 plays, 44 yards, 3:12.**
- CAR – Eddy Piñeiro 47-yard field goal, 9:16. Saints 7–3. **Drive: 12 plays, 46 yards, 5:39.**
- NO – D'Marco Jackson 8-yard fumble return (Blake Grupe kick), 4:37. Saints 14–3.

**Third quarter**

- CAR – Eddy Piñeiro 29-yard field goal, 4:57. Saints 14–6. **Drive: 12 plays, 75 yards, 6:16.**

**Fourth quarter**

- NO – Chris Olave 7-yard pass from Derek Carr (Blake Grupe kick), 5:59. Saints 21–6. **Drive: 5 plays, 64 yards, 2:13.**
- NO – Jimmy Graham 4-yard pass from Derek Carr (Blake Grupe kick), 4:29. Saints 28–6. **Drive: 4 plays, 24 yards, 0:58.**

**Top passers**

- CAR – Bryce Young – 13/36, 137 yards
- NO – Derek Carr – 18/26, 119 yards, 2 TD, INT

**Top rushers**

- CAR – Chuba Hubbard – 23 rushes, 87 yards
- NO – Alvin Kamara – 12 rushes, 56 yards, TD

**Top receivers**

- CAR – Adam Thielen – 5 receptions, 74 yards
- NO – Chris Olave – 4 receptions, 28 yards, TD

The Panthers travel to New Orleans to take on the Saints. In a stunning fashion, the Panthers lose 28-6 and got swept by the Saints for the first time since 2020.

==== Week 15: vs. Atlanta Falcons ====
Week 15: Atlanta Falcons at Carolina Panthers – Game summary

Quarter	1	2	3	4	Total
Falcons	0	7	0	0	**7**
**Panthers**	0	3	0	6	**9**

at Bank of America Stadium, Charlotte, North Carolina

- Date: December 17
- Game time: 1:00 p.m. EST
- Game weather: Rain, 46 °F (8 °C)
- Game attendance: 70,301
- Referee: Land Clark
- TV announcers (Fox): Adam Amin, Mark Schlereth and Kristina Pink
- Recap, Game Book

Game information

**First quarter**

- No scoring plays.

**Second quarter**

- ATL – Cordarrelle Patterson 2-yard pass from Desmond Ridder (Younghoe Koo kick), 4:49. Falcons 7–0. **Drive: 3 plays, 63 yards, 1:17.**
- CAR – Eddy Piñeiro 34-yard field goal, 0:22. Falcons 7–3. **Drive: 12 plays, 60 yards, 4:27.**

**Third quarter**

- No scoring plays.

**Fourth quarter**

- CAR – Eddy Piñeiro 25-yard field goal, 13:32. Falcons 7–6. **Drive: 6 plays, 17 yards, 2:54.**
- CAR – Eddy Piñeiro 23-yard field goal, 0:00. Panthers 9–7. **Drive: 17 plays, 90 yards, 7:35.**

**Top passers**

- ATL – Desmond Ridder – 12/20, 152 yards, TD, INT
- CAR – Bryce Young – 18/24, 167 yards

**Top rushers**

- ATL – Tyler Allgeier – 14 rushes, 45 yards
- CAR – Chuba Hubbard – 22 rushes, 87 yards

**Top receivers**

- ATL – Kyle Pitts – 3 receptions, 37 yards
- CAR – Adam Thielen – 4 receptions, 43 yards

==== Week 16: vs. Green Bay Packers ====
Week 16: Green Bay Packers at Carolina Panthers – Game summary

Quarter	1	2	3	4	Total
**Packers**	7	16	0	10	**33**
Panthers	3	7	6	14	**30**

at Bank of America Stadium, Charlotte, North Carolina

- Date: December 24
- Game time: 1:00 p.m. EST
- Game weather: Sunny, 67 °F (19 °C)
- Game attendance: 70,875
- Referee: Alex Kemp
- TV announcers (Fox): Chris Myers, Robert Smith and Jen Hale
- Recap, Game Book

Game information

**First quarter**

- GB – A. J. Dillon 1-yard run (Anders Carlson kick), 7:30. Packers 7–0. **Drive: 7 plays, 80 yards, 3:58.**
- CAR – Eddy Piñeiro 52-yard field goal, 5:24. Packers 7–3. **Drive: 6 plays, 35 yards, 2:06.**

**Second quarter**

- GB – Jordan Love 1-yard run (kick failed), 14:57. Packers 13–3. **Drive: 10 plays, 79 yards, 5:27.**
- CAR – Ihmir Smith-Marsette 20-yard run (Eddy Piñeiro kick), 10:29. Packers 13–10. **Drive: 8 plays, 77 yards, 4:28.**
- GB – Anders Carlson 53-yard field goal, 7:51. Packers 16–10. **Drive: 7 plays, 40 yards, 2:38.**
- GB – Dontayvion Wicks 21-yard pass from Jordan Love (Anders Carlson kick), 0:49. Packers 23–10. **Drive: 11 plays, 60 yards, 3:23.**

**Third quarter**

- CAR – Chuba Hubbard 4-yard run (kick failed), 5:11. Packers 23–16. **Drive: 14 plays, 72 yards, 8:20.**

**Fourth quarter**

- GB – Romeo Doubs 5-yard pass from Jordan Love (Anders Carlson kick), 14:57. Packers 30–16. **Drive: 9 plays, 66 yards, 5:14.**
- CAR – D. J. Chark 11-yard pass from Bryce Young (kick failed), 7:14. Packers 30–22. **Drive: 9 plays, 60 yards, 4:24.**
- CAR – D. J. Chark 10-yard pass from Bryce Young (Raheem Blackshear run), 4:05. Tied 30–30. **Drive: 5 plays, 70 yards, 1:42.**
- GB – Anders Carlson 32-yard field goal, 0:19. Packers 33–30. **Drive: 9 plays, 61 yards, 3:46.**

**Top passers**

- GB – Jordan Love – 17/28, 219 yards, 2 TD
- CAR – Bryce Young – 23/36, 312 yards, 2 TD

**Top rushers**

- GB – Aaron Jones – 21 rushes, 127 yards
- CAR – Chuba Hubbard – 16 rushes, 43 yards, TD

**Top receivers**

- GB – Romeo Doubs – 4 receptions, 79 yards, TD
- CAR – D. J. Chark – 6 receptions, 98 yards, 2 TD

==== Week 17: at Jacksonville Jaguars ====
Week 17: Carolina Panthers at Jacksonville Jaguars – Game summary

Quarter	1	2	3	4	Total
Panthers	0	0	0	0	**0**
**Jaguars**	3	6	10	7	**26**

at EverBank Stadium, Jacksonville, Florida

- Date: December 31
- Game time: 1:00 p.m. EST
- Game weather: 56 °F (13 °C)
- Game attendance: 67,215
- Referee: Carl Cheffers
- TV announcers (CBS): Spero Dedes, Adam Archuleta and Aditi Kinkhabwala
- Recap, Game Book

Game information

**First quarter**

- JAX – Brandon McManus 35-yard field goal, 8:36. Jaguars 3–0. **Drive: 13 plays, 43 yards, 6:24.**

**Second quarter**

- JAX – Brandon McManus 26-yard field goal, 7:18. Jaguars 6–0. **Drive: 12 plays, 54 yards, 5:47.**
- JAX – Brandon McManus 24-yard field goal, 2:45. Jaguars 9–0. **Drive: 6 plays, 54 yards, 1:50.**

**Third quarter**

- JAX – Travis Etienne 62-yard run (Brandon McManus kick), 11:56. Jaguars 16–0. **Drive: 2 plays, 66 yards, 0:51.**
- JAX – Brandon McManus 34-yard field goal, 3:00. Jaguars 19–0. **Drive: 12 plays, 67 yards, 7:24.**

**Fourth quarter**

- JAX – Travis Etienne 1-yard run (Brandon McManus kick), 4:16. Jaguars 26–0. **Drive: 4 plays, 15 yards, 2:08.**

**Top passers**

- CAR – Bryce Young – 19/32, 112 yards, INT
- JAX – C. J. Beathard – 17/24, 178 yards

**Top rushers**

- CAR – Chuba Hubbard – 11 rushes, 45 yards
- JAX – Travis Etienne – 16 rushes, 102 yards, 2 TD

**Top receivers**

- CAR – Adam Thielen – 6 receptions, 38 yards
- JAX – Evan Engram – 6 receptions, 60 yards

The Panthers were shut out for the first time since Week 14 of the 2002 season. With this loss, the Panthers dropped to 2-14 and locked up the league's worst record for the third time ever (following the 2001 and 2010 seasons), giving the Chicago Bears the no. 1 overall pick in the 2024 draft.

==== Week 18: vs. Tampa Bay Buccaneers ====
Week 18: Tampa Bay Buccaneers at Carolina Panthers – Game summary

Quarter	1	2	3	4	Total
**Buccaneers**	0	6	0	3	**9**
Panthers	0	0	0	0	**0**

at Bank of America Stadium, Charlotte, North Carolina

- Date: January 7
- Game time: 1:00 p.m. EST
- Game weather: Partly cloudy, 54 °F (12 °C)
- Game attendance: 69,010
- Referee: Clete Blakeman
- TV announcers (Fox): Kenny Albert, Jonathan Vilma and Shannon Spake
- Recap, Game Book

Game information

**First quarter**

- No scoring plays.

**Second quarter**

- TB – Chase McLaughlin 36-yard field goal, 4:13. Buccaneers 3–0. **Drive: 8 plays, 53 yards, 5:00.**
- TB – Chase McLaughlin 57-yard field goal, 0:00. Buccaneers 6–0. **Drive: 9 plays, 17 yards, 1:11.**

**Third quarter**

- No scoring plays.

**Fourth quarter**

- TB – Chase McLaughlin 39-yard field goal, 10:18. Buccaneers 9–0. **Drive: 9 plays, 37 yards, 4:42.**

**Top passers**

- TB – Baker Mayfield – 20/32, 137 yards
- CAR – Bryce Young – 11/18, 94 yards

**Top rushers**

- TB – Rachaad White – 19 rushes, 75 yards
- CAR – Chuba Hubbard – 23 rushes, 83 yards

**Top receivers**

- TB – Chris Godwin – 6 receptions, 51 yards
- CAR – D. J. Chark – 2 receptions, 46 yards

The Panthers ended their atrocious season with a second straight shutout, becoming the first team since the 2008 Cleveland Browns to be shut out in back-to-back games. With this loss, the Panthers finished with the NFL's worst record at 2-15 (the first such record since the league expanded to 17 games in 2021).

=== Standings ===
==== Division ====
NFC South
	W	L	T	PCT	DIV	CONF	PF	PA	STK
^{(4)} Tampa Bay Buccaneers	9	8	0	.529	4–2	7–5	348	325	W1
New Orleans Saints	9	8	0	.529	4–2	6–6	402	327	W2
Atlanta Falcons	7	10	0	.412	3–3	4–8	321	373	L2
Carolina Panthers	2	15	0	.118	1–5	1–11	236	416	L3

==== Conference ====
NFC
#	Team	Division	W	L	T	PCT	DIV	CONF	SOS	SOV	STK
**Division leaders**
1 (Note: San Francisco finished ahead of Dallas and Detroit based on conference record, claiming the No. 1 seed.)	San Francisco 49ers	West	12	5	0	.706	5–1	10–2	.509	.475	L1
2 (Note: Dallas claimed the No. 2 seed over Detroit based on head-to-head victory.)	Dallas Cowboys	East	12	5	0	.706	5–1	9–3	.446	.392	W2
3	Detroit Lions	North	12	5	0	.706	4–2	8–4	.481	.436	W1
4 (Note: Tampa Bay finished ahead of New Orleans in the NFC South based on common record. (Tampa Bay is 8–4 against Minnesota, Chicago, Detroit, Green Bay, Atlanta, Carolina, Houston, Tennessee, Jacksonville, and Indianapolis, while New Orleans is 6–6 against the same teams.))	Tampa Bay Buccaneers	South	9	8	0	.529	4–2	7–5	.481	.379	W1
**Wild cards**
5	Philadelphia Eagles	East	11	6	0	.647	4–2	7–5	.481	.476	L2
6	Los Angeles Rams	West	10	7	0	.588	5–1	8–4	.529	.453	W4
7 (Note: Green Bay and Seattle finished ahead of New Orleans based on conference record.) (Note: Green Bay finished ahead of Seattle based on strength of victory, claiming the 7th and final playoff spot.)	Green Bay Packers	North	9	8	0	.529	4–2	7–5	.474	.458	W3
**Did not qualify for the postseason**
8	Seattle Seahawks	West	9	8	0	.529	2–4	7–5	.512	.392	W1
9	New Orleans Saints	South	9	8	0	.529	4–2	6–6	.433	.340	W2
10 (Note: Minnesota finished ahead of Atlanta based on head-to-head victory. Division tie break was initially used to eliminate Chicago (see below).) (Note: Minnesota finished ahead of Chicago based on common record. (Minnesota is 5–7 against Tampa Bay, Los Angeles Chargers, Carolina, Kansas City, Green Bay, Atlanta, New Orleans, Denver, Las Vegas, and Detroit, while Chicago is 4–8 against the same teams.))	Minnesota Vikings	North	7	10	0	.412	2–4	6–6	.509	.454	L4
11 (Note: Chicago finished ahead of Atlanta based on head-to-head victory.)	Chicago Bears	North	7	10	0	.412	2–4	6–6	.464	.370	L1
12	Atlanta Falcons	South	7	10	0	.412	3–3	4–8	.429	.462	L2
13	New York Giants	East	6	11	0	.353	3–3	5–7	.512	.353	W1
14 (Note: Washington finished ahead of Arizona based on head-to-head victory.)	Washington Commanders	East	4	13	0	.235	0–6	2–10	.512	.338	L8
15	Arizona Cardinals	West	4	13	0	.235	0–6	3–9	.561	.588	L1
16	Carolina Panthers	South	2	15	0	.118	1–5	1–11	.522	.500	L3
**Tiebreakers** (Note: When breaking ties for three or more teams under the NFL's rules, they are first broken within divisions, then comparing only the highest-ranked remaining team from each division.)
