= Chris Tabor =

American football player and coach (born 1971)

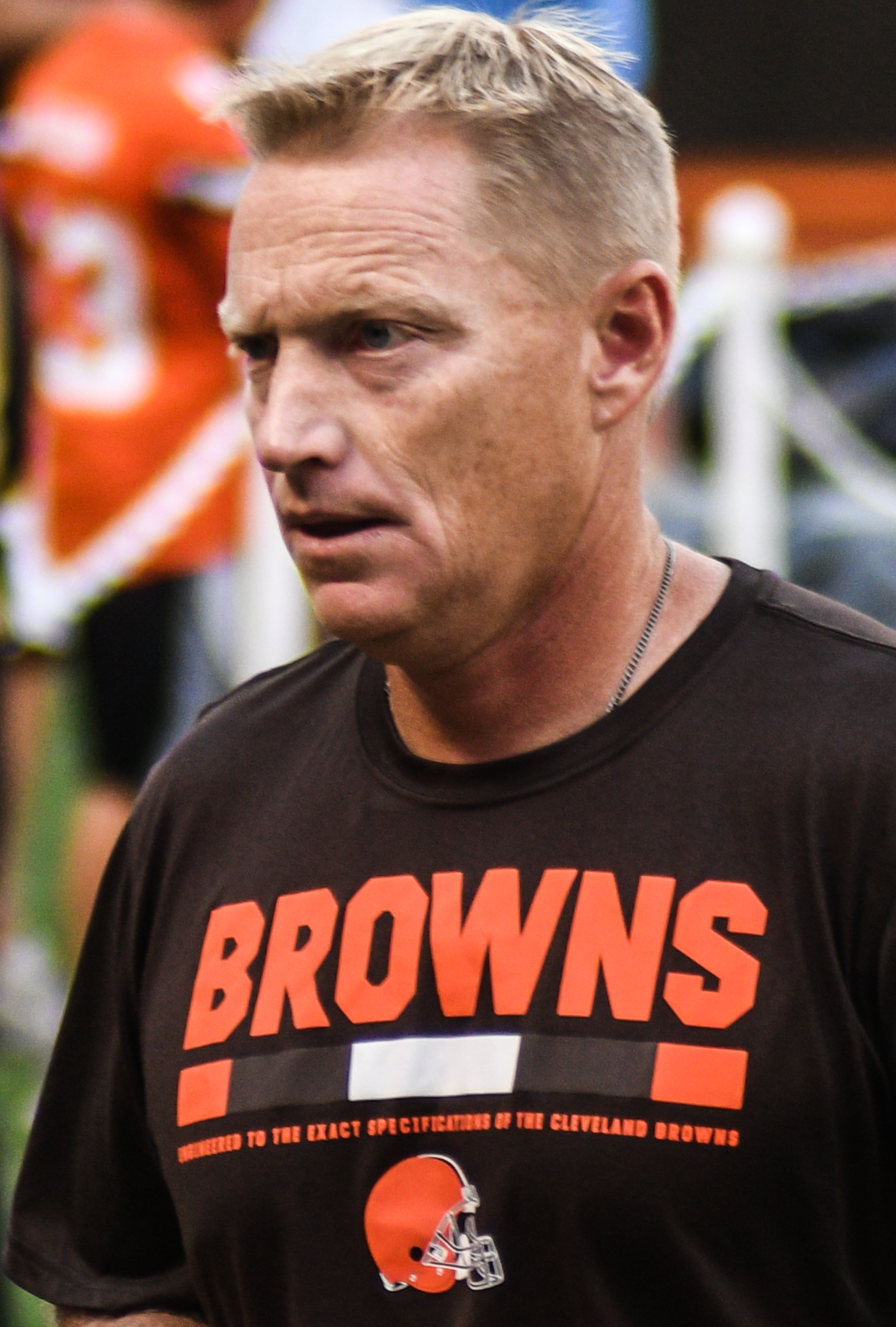
- Tabor with the Cleveland Browns in 2017

Miami Dolphins
- Title: Special teams coordinator

Personal information
- Born: March 4, 1971 (age 55); St. Joseph, Missouri, U.S.

Career information
- Position: Quarterback
- High school: Benton (St. Joseph, Missouri)
- College: Benedictine
- NFL draft: 1993: undrafted

Career history
- Benton HS (MO) (1993) Assistant coach; Hutchinson (1994) Running backs coach; Central Methodist (1995–1996) Offensive coordinator; Missouri (1997–1999) Graduate assistant; Missouri (2000) Running backs coach & special teams coach; Culver–Stockton (2001) Head coach; Utah State (2002–2004) Assistant head coach & wide receivers coach; Utah State (2005) Running backs coach & special teams coach; Western Michigan (2006–2007) Running backs coach & special teams coach; Chicago Bears (2008–2010) Assistant special teams coach; Cleveland Browns (2011–2017) Special teams coordinator; Chicago Bears (2018–2021) Special teams coordinator; Carolina Panthers (2022–2023) Special teams coordinator; Carolina Panthers (2023) Interim head coach & special teams coordinator; Buffalo Bills (2025) Special teams coordinator; Miami Dolphins (2026–present) Special teams coordinator

Head coaching record
- Regular season: NFL: 1–6 (.143); College: 6–5 (.545)
- Coaching profile at Pro Football Reference

Chris Tabor (born March 4, 1971) is an American football coach who is the special teams coordinator for the Miami Dolphins of the National Football League (NFL). He has also served as an assistant coach for the Cleveland Browns (from 2011 to 2017) and the Chicago Bears (from 2018 to 2021), and has more than 30 years of coaching experience between the high school, collegiate and professional levels.

== Early life and education ==
Tabor earned a degree in physical education in 1993 at Benedictine College in Atchison, Kansas, where he was a three-year starter at quarterback for the Benedictine Ravens. He was an all-conference selection and team MVP in 1992, when the Ravens won the Heart of America Athletic Conference (HAAC) championship, and advanced to the NAIA Division II national semifinals. In 2017 Tabor was elected into the Benedictine College Hall of Fame. He earned his master's degree in education in 1999 from Columbia (Mo.) College.

== Coaching career ==
=== Early career ===
Tabor started his coaching career in 1993 as an assistant at his alma mater, Benton High School, in St. Joseph, Missouri. The following year, he coached running backs at Hutchinson Community College, in Hutchinson, Kansas, before serving as the offensive coordinator at Central Methodist University from 1995 to 1996.

=== Missouri ===
In 1997, Tabor was hired by the University of Missouri as a graduate assistant. He would serve in that role for three years before being promoted to their running backs and special teams coach in 2000. While Tabor was there, the Tigers ranked in the nation's top 10 for rushing offense and they played in two bowl games.

=== Culver–Stockton College ===
In 2001, Tabor was hired as the head football coach at Culver–Stockton College in Canton, Missouri. He led the program to a 6–5 record, the school's first winning season in 15 years. In Tabor's only season there, his team set school records for points scored, touchdowns and total yards, and ranked 17th in the NAIA in total defense and 10th in pass defense.

=== Utah State ===
In 2002, Tabor joined Utah State University as their assistant head coach and wide receivers coach. In 2005, he served as their running backs and special teams coach.

=== Western Michigan University ===
Tabor spent two seasons (2006 and 2007) at Western Michigan University as the running backs and special teams coach.

=== Chicago Bears (first stint) ===
Tabor left college-level football and got his first shot in the National Football League (NFL) when he spent three seasons (2008–2010) as assistant special teams coach with the Chicago Bears. He worked under coordinator Dave Toub on head coach Lovie Smith's staff. During Tabor's tenure with the Bears, Chicago consistently ranked among the league leaders in numerous departments. The Bears ranked in the top five in no less than nine different special teams categories combined over that three-year period. Chicago led the NFL in total return yards (6,570) and kickoff return yards (5,415), posted the second-best kickoff return average (25.1), ranked third in punt return defense (7.1) and produced the fifth-best punt return average (10.4). The Bears also registered six total kick returns for touchdowns in that time, which tied for second-most in the league.

=== Cleveland Browns ===
In 2011, Tabor was hired by the Cleveland Browns as their special teams coordinator. During Tabor's tenure in Cleveland, the Browns were the only NFL team to have earned at least one AFC Special Teams Player of the Week award each season from 2011 to 2016. In total, the Browns won seven AFC Special Teams Player of the Week awards. He also oversaw kicker Phil Dawson and returner Joshua Cribbs in 2012 when both were selected to the Pro Bowl, marking just the second time in team history that two specialists made the annual all-star game in the same season. Also during his tenure with the Browns, they led the NFL in punt return average (11.3 yards), were first in kickoff return average against (19.8) and were tied for sixth in punt return touchdowns (4).

=== Chicago Bears (second stint) ===
On January 12, 2018, Tabor returned to the Chicago Bears as their special teams coordinator under head coach Matt Nagy.

On October 25, 2021, Nagy tested positive for COVID-19, resulting in Tabor taking over as the interim head coach. On October 31, Tabor made his NFL head coaching debut in the Bears' Week 8 game against the San Francisco 49ers, with the Bears suffering a 33–22 loss.

=== Carolina Panthers ===
On January 27, 2022, Tabor was hired by the Carolina Panthers as their special teams coordinator under head coach Matt Rhule. On November 27, 2023, Tabor was named interim head coach after head coach Frank Reich was fired. Tabor completed the season, leading the Panthers to a 1–5 record. On January 26, 2024, he was let go by the Panthers.

=== Buffalo Bills ===
On February 11, 2025, the Buffalo Bills hired Tabor to serve as their special teams coordinator.

=== Miami Dolphins ===
On January 23, 2026, the Miami Dolphins hired Tabor to serve as their special teams coordinator.

== Personal life ==
Tabor grew up in a football family; his father, Don, coached high school football in Missouri for 40 years and all of his brothers (Donnie, Matt and Michael) played football at Benedictine College.

Tabor and his wife, Nikki (nee Graves), have two daughters, Paityn and Lainey.

== Head coaching record ==
=== College ===
Year	Team	Overall	Conference	Standing	Bowl/playoffs
Culver–Stockton Wildcats (Heart of America Athletic Conference) (2001)
2001	Culver–Stockton	6–5	5–5	T–4th	
Culver–Stockton:		6–5	5–5		
Total:		6–5			

=== NFL ===
Team	Year	Regular season					Postseason			
Team	Year	Won	Lost	Ties	Win %	Finish	Won	Lost	Win %	Result
CHI*	2021	0	1	0	.000		—	—	—	—
CHI total		0	1	0	.000		—	—	—	
CAR*	2023	1	5	0	.167	4th in NFC South	—	—	—	—
CAR total		1	5	0	.167		—	—	—	
Total		1	6	0	.143		0	0	.000	

* Interim head coach
