= April 24 =

April 24 this year in various calendars
- Friday, 24 April 2026
Akan	Nwonafie
Armenian	8 Mareri 1475
Aztec	Xocotlhuetzi 4, 1 Malīnalli
Babylonian	6 Nisanu, 2337 SE
Balinese pawukon	Luang, Pepet, Beteng, Menala, Umanis, Aryang, Sukra of Ukir, Yama, Tulus, Pati
Bengali	11 Boisakh, BS 1433
Chinese	Yang Earth Dragon・Ghost Mansion; Fire Horse Year, Month 3, Day 8 (Guyu, 11 days until Lixia)
Common Era	24 April 2026 CE
Coptic	16 Parmouti, AM 1742
Egyptian	8 Thoth, 2775 NE
Ethiopian	16 Miyāzyā, 2018 Amätä Məhrät
French Republican	Décade I, Quintidi de Floréal de l'Année 234 de la République
Gregorian	24 April, AD 2026
Hebrew	7 Iyar, AM 5786; Omer 22
Hindu	Puṣya・Dhṛti; Solar: 11 Vaiśākha, 1948 SE; Lunisolar: Aṣṭamī, Śukla pakṣa of Vaiśākha, 2083 VE; Rāudra・5127 KY・1,872,689
Icelandic	Föstudagur, 2 Harpa 2026
Islamic	7 Dhu al-Qi'dah, AH 1447 (using tabular method)
ISO week date	2026-W17-5
Japanese	8 Yayoi, Reiwa 8 (Kokuu, 11 days until Rikka)
Julian	11 April, AD 2026 (AM 7534)
Julian day	2461155
Korean	8 Yongdal, 4359 DE
Maya	13.0.13.9.12; 5 Uo, 1 Eb
Roman	ante diem III Idus Apriles, MMDCCLXXIX AUC
Solar Hijri	4 Ordibehesht, SH 1405
Tibetan	8 nag pa, me pho rta 2153 or 1772 or 1000

<<	April					>>
Su	Mo	Tu	We	Th	Fr	Sa
			1	2	3	4
5	6	7	8	9	10	11
12	13	14	15	16	17	18
19	20	21	22	23	24	25
26	27	28	29	30
2026

April 24 in recent years
2026 (Friday)
2025 (Thursday)
2024 (Wednesday)
2023 (Monday)
2022 (Sunday)
2021 (Saturday)
2020 (Friday)
2019 (Wednesday)
2018 (Tuesday)
2017 (Monday)

April 24 is the 114th day of the year (115th in leap years) in the Gregorian calendar; 251 days remain until the end of the year.

== Events ==
=== Pre-1600 ===
- 1479 BC – Thutmose III ascends to the throne of Egypt, although power effectively shifts to Hatshepsut (according to the Low Chronology of the 18th dynasty).
- 1183 BC – Traditional reckoning of the Fall of Troy marking the end of the legendary Trojan War, given by chief librarian of the Library of Alexandria Eratosthenes, among others.
- 858 – Consecration of Pope Nicholas I following the death of Pope Benedict III earlier that month.
- 934 – Abbasid Caliph Al-Qahir is deposed and blinded. His nephew al-Radi succeeds him as caliph.
- 1547 – Battle of Mühlberg. Duke of Alba, commanding Spanish-Imperial forces of Charles I of Spain, defeats the troops of Schmalkaldic League.
- 1558 – Mary, Queen of Scots, marries the Dauphin of France, François, at Notre-Dame de Paris.

=== 1601–1900 ===
- 1704 – The first regular newspaper in British Colonial America, The Boston News-Letter, is published.
- 1793 – French revolutionary Jean-Paul Marat is acquitted by the Revolutionary Tribunal of charges brought by the Girondin in Paris.
- 1800 – The United States Library of Congress is established when President John Adams signs legislation to appropriate $5,000 to purchase "such books as may be necessary for the use of Congress".
- 1837 – The great fire in Surat, India causes more than 500 deaths and destruction of more than 9,000 houses.
- 1877 – Russo-Turkish War: The Russian Empire declares war on the Ottoman Empire.
- 1885 – American sharpshooter Annie Oakley is hired by Nate Salsbury to be a part of Buffalo Bill's Wild West.
- 1895 – Joshua Slocum, the first person to sail single-handedly around the world, sets sail from Boston, Massachusetts aboard the sloop Spray.

=== 1901–present ===
- 1913 – The Woolworth Building, a skyscraper in New York City, is opened.
- 1914 – The Franck–Hertz experiment, a pillar of quantum mechanics, is presented to the German Physical Society.
- 1915 – The arrest of 250 Armenian intellectuals and community leaders in Istanbul marks the beginning of the Armenian genocide.
- 1916 – Easter Rising: Irish rebels, led by Patrick Pearse and James Connolly, launch an uprising in Dublin against British rule and proclaim an Irish Republic.
- 1916 – Ernest Shackleton and five men of the Imperial Trans-Antarctic Expedition launch a lifeboat from uninhabited Elephant Island in the Southern Ocean to organise a rescue for the crew of the sunken Endurance.
- 1918 – World War I: First tank-to-tank combat, during the second Battle of Villers-Bretonneux. Three British Mark IVs meet three German A7Vs.
- 1922 – The first segment of the Imperial Wireless Chain providing wireless telegraphy between Leafield in Oxfordshire, England, and Cairo, Egypt, comes into operation.
- 1924 – Thorvald Stauning becomes premier of Denmark (first term).
- 1926 – The Treaty of Berlin is signed. Germany and the Soviet Union each pledge neutrality in the event of an attack on the other by a third party for the next five years.
- 1932 – Benny Rothman leads the mass trespass of Kinder Scout, leading to substantial legal reforms in the United Kingdom.
- 1933 – Nazi Germany begins its persecution of Jehovah's Witnesses by shutting down the Watch Tower Society office in Magdeburg.
- 1944 – World War II: The SBS launches a raid against the garrison of Santorini in Greece.
- 1953 – Winston Churchill is knighted by Queen Elizabeth II.
- 1955 – The Bandung Conference ends: Twenty-nine non-aligned nations of Asia and Africa finish a meeting that condemns colonialism, racism, and the Cold War.
- 1957 – Suez Crisis: The Suez Canal is reopened following the introduction of UNEF peacekeepers to the region.
- 1963 – Marriage of Princess Alexandra of Kent to Angus Ogilvy at Westminster Abbey in London.
- 1965 – Civil war breaks out in the Dominican Republic when Colonel Francisco Caamaño overthrows the triumvirate that had been in power since the coup d'état against Juan Bosch.
- 1967 – Cosmonaut Vladimir Komarov dies in Soyuz 1 when its parachute fails to open. He is the first human to die during a space mission.
- 1967 – Vietnam War: American General William Westmoreland says in a news conference that the enemy had "gained support in the United States that gives him hope that he can win politically that which he cannot win militarily".
- 1970 – China launches Dong Fang Hong I, becoming the fifth nation to put an object into orbit using its own booster.
- 1970 – The Gambia becomes a republic within the Commonwealth of Nations, with Dawda Jawara as its first President.
- 1980 – Eight U.S. servicemen die in Operation Eagle Claw as they attempt to end the Iran hostage crisis.
- 1990 – STS-31: The Hubble Space Telescope is launched from the Space Shuttle Discovery.
- 1990 – Gruinard Island, Scotland, is officially declared free of the anthrax disease after 48 years of quarantine.
- 1993 – An IRA bomb devastates the Bishopsgate area of London.
- 1994 – A Douglas DC-3 ditches in Botany Bay after takeoff from Sydney Airport. All 25 people on board survive.
- 1996 – In the United States, the Antiterrorism and Effective Death Penalty Act of 1996 is passed into law.
- 2004 – The United States lifts economic sanctions imposed on Libya 18 years previously, as a reward for its cooperation in eliminating weapons of mass destruction.
- 2005 – Cardinal Joseph Ratzinger is inaugurated as the 265th Pope of the Catholic Church taking the name Pope Benedict XVI.
- 2006 – Bombings in the Egyptian resort city of Dahab kill 23 people and injure about 80.
- 2011 – WikiLeaks starts publishing the Guantanamo Bay files leak.
- 2013 – A building collapses near Dhaka, Bangladesh, killing 1,134 people and injuring about 2,500 others.
- 2013 – Violence in Bachu County, Kashgar Prefecture, of China's Xinjiang results in death of 21 people.
- 2025 – A mass stabbing at a school in Nantes, France, leaves one person dead and three others wounded.

== Births ==
=== Pre-1600 ===
- 1086 – Ramiro II of Aragon (died 1157)
- 1492 – Sabina of Bavaria, Bavarian duchess and noblewoman (died 1564)
- 1532 – Thomas Lucy, English politician (died 1600)
- 1533 – William I of Orange, founding father of the Netherlands (died 1584)
- 1538 – Guglielmo Gonzaga, Duke of Mantua (died 1587)
- 1545 – Henry Wriothesley, 2nd Earl of Southampton, English Earl (died 1581)
- 1562 – Xu Guangqi, Ming Dynasty Chinese politician, scholar and lay Catholic leader (died 1633)
- 1581 – Vincent de Paul, French priest and saint (died 1660)

=== 1601–1900 ===
- 1608 – Gaston, Duke of Orléans, third son of King Henry IV of France (died 1660)
- 1620 – John Graunt, English demographer and statistician (died 1674)
- 1706 – Giovanni Battista Martini, Italian pianist and composer (died 1780)
- 1718 – Nathaniel Hone the Elder, Irish-English painter and educator (died 1784)
- 1743 – Edmund Cartwright, English clergyman and engineer, invented the power loom (died 1823)
- 1784 – Peter Vivian Daniel, American lawyer and jurist (died 1860)
- 1815 – Anthony Trollope, English novelist, essayist, and short story writer (died 1882)
- 1823 – Sebastián Lerdo de Tejada, Mexican politician, President of Mexico (died 1889)
- 1829 – Luisa Cappiani, Austrian soprano, educator and essayist (died 1919)
- 1845 – Carl Spitteler, Swiss poet and author, Nobel Prize laureate (died 1924)
- 1856 – Philippe Pétain, French general and politician, 119th Prime Minister of France (died 1951)
- 1860 – Queen Marau, last Queen of Tahiti (died 1935)
- 1862 – Tomitaro Makino, Japanese botanist (died 1957)
- 1868 – Sandy Herd, Scottish golfer (died 1944)
- 1876 – Erich Raeder, German admiral (died 1960)
- 1878 – Jean Crotti, Swiss-French painter (died 1958)
- 1879 – Susanna Bokoyni, Hungarian-American circus performer (died 1984)
- 1880 – Gideon Sundback, Swedish-American engineer and businessman, developed the zipper (died 1954)
- 1880 – Josef Müller, Croatian entomologist (died 1964)
- 1882 – Hugh Dowding, 1st Baron Dowding, Scottish-English air marshal (died 1970)
- 1885 – Thomas Cronan, American triple jumper (died 1962)
- 1885 – Con Walsh, Irish-Canadian hammer thrower and footballer (died 1961)
- 1887 – Denys Finch Hatton, English hunter (died 1931)
- 1888 – Pe Maung Tin, Burma-based scholar and educator (died 1973)
- 1889 – Stafford Cripps, English academic and politician, Chancellor of the Exchequer (died 1952)
- 1889 – Lyubov Popova, Russian painter and academic (died 1924)
- 1897 – Manuel Ávila Camacho, Mexican colonel and politician, 45th President of Mexico (died 1955)
- 1897 – Benjamin Lee Whorf, American linguist, anthropologist, and engineer (died 1941)
- 1899 – Oscar Zariski, Russian-American mathematician and academic (died 1986)
- 1900 – Elizabeth Goudge, English author and educator (died 1984)

=== 1901–present ===
- 1903 – José Antonio Primo de Rivera, Spanish lawyer and politician, founded the Falange (died 1936)
- 1904 – Willem de Kooning, Dutch-American painter and educator (died 1997)
- 1905 – Al Bates, American long jumper (died 1999)
- 1905 – Robert Penn Warren, American novelist, poet, and literary critic (died 1989)
- 1906 – William Joyce, American-born Irish-British Nazi propaganda broadcaster (died 1946)
- 1906 – Mimi Smith, English nurse (died 1991)
- 1907 – Gabriel Figueroa, Mexican cinematographer (died 1997)
- 1908 – Marceline Day, American actress (died 2000)
- 1908 – Inga Gentzel, Swedish runner (died 1991)
- 1908 – Józef Gosławski, Polish sculptor (died 1963)
- 1912 – Ruth Osburn, American discus thrower (died 1994)
- 1913 – Dieter Grau, German-American scientist and engineer (died 2014)
- 1914 – William Castle, American director, producer, and screenwriter (died 1977)
- 1914 – Phil Watson, Canadian ice hockey player and coach (died 1991)
- 1914 – Justin Wilson, American chef and author (died 2001)
- 1916 – Lou Thesz, American wrestler and trainer (died 2002)
- 1919 – David Blackwell, American mathematician and academic (died 2010)
- 1919 – Glafcos Clerides, Cypriot lawyer and politician, 4th President of Cyprus (died 2013)
- 1920 – Gino Valenzano, Italian race car driver (died 2011)
- 1922 – Marc-Adélard Tremblay, Canadian anthropologist and academic (died 2014)
- 1923 – Gus Bodnar, Canadian ice hockey player and coach (died 2005)
- 1923 – Doris Burn, American author and illustrator (died 2011)
- 1924 – Clement Freud, German-English radio host, academic, and politician (died 2009)
- 1924 – Ruth Kobart, American actress and singer (died 2002)
- 1925 – Franco Leccese, Italian sprinter (died 1992)
- 1926 – Marilyn Erskine, American actress
- 1926 – Thorbjörn Fälldin, Swedish farmer and politician, 27th Prime Minister of Sweden (died 2016)
- 1927 – Josy Barthel, Luxembourgish runner and politician, Luxembourgish Minister for Energy (died 1992)
- 1928 – Tommy Docherty, Scottish footballer and manager (died 2020)
- 1928 – Johnny Griffin, American saxophonist (died 2008)
- 1928 – Anahit Perikhanian, Russian-born Armenian Iranologist (died 2012)
- 1929 – Dr. Rajkumar, Indian actor and singer (died 2006)
- 1930 – Jerome Callet, American instrument designer, educator, and author (died 2019)
- 1930 – Richard Donner, American actor, director, and producer (died 2021)
- 1930 – José Sarney, Brazilian lawyer and politician, 31st President of Brazil
- 1931 – Abdelhamid Kermali, Algerian footballer and manager (died 2013)
- 1931 – Bridget Riley, English painter and illustrator
- 1934 – Jayakanthan, Indian journalist and author (died 2015)
- 1934 – Shirley MacLaine, American actress, singer, and dancer
- 1936 – David Crombie, Canadian educator and politician, 56th Mayor of Toronto
- 1936 – Jill Ireland, English actress (died 1990)
- 1937 – Joe Henderson, American saxophonist and composer (died 2001)
- 1940 – Sue Grafton, American author (died 2017)
- 1941 – Richard Holbrooke, American journalist, banker, and diplomat, 22nd United States Ambassador to the United Nations (died 2010)
- 1941 – John Williams, Australian-English guitarist and composer
- 1942 – Richard M. Daley, American lawyer and politician, 54th Mayor of Chicago
- 1942 – Barbra Streisand, American singer, actress, activist, and producer
- 1943 – Richard Sterban, American country and gospel bass singer
- 1943 – Gordon West, English footballer (died 2012)
- 1944 – Peter Cresswell, English judge
- 1944 – Maarja Nummert, Estonian architect
- 1944 – Tony Visconti, American record producer, musician and singer
- 1945 – Doug Clifford, American drummer and songwriter
- 1946 – Doug Christie, Canadian lawyer and activist (died 2013)
- 1946 – Phil Robertson, American hunter and television personality (died 2025)
- 1947 – Josep Borrell, Spanish engineer and politician, 22nd President of the European Parliament
- 1947 – João Braz de Aviz, Brazilian cardinal
- 1947 – Claude Dubois, Canadian singer-songwriter and guitarist
- 1947 – Denise Kingsmill, Baroness Kingsmill, New Zealand-English lawyer and politician
- 1947 – Roger D. Kornberg, American biochemist and academic, Nobel Prize laureate
- 1948 – Paul Cellucci, American soldier and politician, 69th Governor of Massachusetts (died 2013)
- 1948 – Eliana Gil, Ecuadorian-American psychiatrist, therapist, and author
- 1949 – Eddie Hart, American sprinter
- 1949 – Véronique Sanson, French singer-songwriter and producer
- 1950 – Rob Hyman, American singer-songwriter and musician
- 1951 – Ron Arad, Israeli architect and academic
- 1951 – Christian Bobin, French author and poet (died 2022)
- 1951 – Nigel Harrison, English bass player and songwriter
- 1951 – Enda Kenny, Irish educator and politician, 13th Taoiseach of Ireland
- 1952 – Jean Paul Gaultier, French fashion designer
- 1952 – Ralph Winter, American film producer
- 1953 – Eric Bogosian, American actor and writer
- 1954 – Mumia Abu-Jamal, American journalist, activist, and convicted murderer
- 1954 – Jack Blades, American singer-songwriter and bass player
- 1955 – Marion Caspers-Merk, German politician
- 1955 – John de Mol Jr., Dutch businessman, co-founded Endemol
- 1955 – Eamon Gilmore, Irish trade union leader and politician, 25th Tánaiste of Ireland
- 1955 – Margaret Moran, British politician and criminal
- 1955 – Guy Nève, Belgian race car driver (died 1992)
- 1955 – Michael O'Keefe, American actor
- 1955 – Bill Osborne, New Zealand rugby player
- 1956 – James A. Winnefeld, Jr., American admiral
- 1957 – Nazir Ahmed, Baron Ahmed, Pakistani-English businessman and politician
- 1958 – Brian Paddick, English police officer and politician
- 1959 – Paula Yates, British-Australian television host and author (died 2000)
- 1961 – Andrew Murrison, English physician and politician, Minister for International Security Strategy
- 1962 – Clemens Binninger, German politician
- 1962 – Stuart Pearce, English footballer, coach, and manager
- 1962 – Steve Roach, Australian rugby league player, coach, and sportscaster
- 1963 – Paula Frazer, American singer-songwriter and guitarist
- 1963 – Billy Gould, American bass player, songwriter, and producer
- 1963 – Mano Solo, French singer-songwriter, guitarist, and producer (died 2010)
- 1964 – Helga Arendt, German sprinter (died 2013)
- 1964 – Cedric the Entertainer, American comedian, actor, and producer
- 1964 – Djimon Hounsou, Beninese-American actor and producer
- 1964 – Witold Smorawiński, Polish guitarist, composer, and educator
- 1965 – Jeff Jackson, Canadian ice hockey player and manager
- 1966 – Pierre Brassard, Canadian comedian and actor
- 1966 – Alessandro Costacurta, Italian footballer, coach, and manager
- 1966 – David Usher, English-Canadian singer-songwriter
- 1967 – Dino Rađa, Croatian basketball player
- 1967 – Omar Vizquel, Venezuelan-American baseball player and coach
- 1968 – Aidan Gillen, Irish actor
- 1968 – Todd Jones, American baseball player
- 1968 – Roxanna Panufnik, English composer
- 1968 – Hashim Thaçi, Kosovan soldier and politician, 5th Prime Minister of Kosovo
- 1969 – Elias Atmatsidis, Greek footballer
- 1969 – Rory McCann, Scottish actor
- 1969 – Eilidh Whiteford, Scottish academic and politician
- 1970 – Damien Fleming, Australian cricketer, coach, and sportscaster
- 1971 – Kumar Dharmasena, Sri Lankan cricketer and umpire
- 1971 – Mauro Pawlowski, Belgian singer-songwriter and guitarist
- 1972 – Rab Douglas, Scottish footballer
- 1972 – Chipper Jones, American baseball player
- 1972 – Jure Košir, Slovenian skier and singer
- 1973 – Gabby Logan, English gymnast, television and radio host
- 1973 – Damon Lindelof, American screenwriter and producer
- 1973 – Brian Marshall, American bass player and songwriter
- 1973 – Eric Snow, American basketball player and coach
- 1973 – Sachin Tendulkar, Indian cricketer
- 1973 – Toomas Tohver, Estonian footballer
- 1973 – Lee Westwood, English golfer
- 1974 – Eric Kripke, American director, producer, and screenwriter
- 1974 – Stephen Wiltshire, English illustrator
- 1975 – Sam Doumit, American actress
- 1975 – Marte Mjøs Persen, Norwegian politician
- 1975 – Dejan Savić, Yugoslavian and Serbian water polo player
- 1976 – Hedda Berntsen, Norwegian skier
- 1976 – Steve Finnan, Irish international footballer
- 1976 – Frédéric Niemeyer, Canadian tennis player and coach
- 1977 – Carlos Beltrán, Puerto Rican-American baseball player
- 1977 – Diego Placente, Argentine footballer
- 1978 – Diego Quintana, Argentine footballer
- 1979 – Avey Tare, American musician
- 1980 – Fernando Arce, Mexican footballer
- 1980 – Karen Asrian, Armenian chess player (died 2008)
- 1981 – Taylor Dent, American tennis player
- 1981 – Yuko Nakanishi, Japanese swimmer
- 1982 – Kelly Clarkson, American singer-songwriter, talk show host
- 1982 – David Oliver, American hurdler
- 1982 – Simon Tischer, German volleyball player
- 1983 – Hanna Melnychenko, Ukrainian heptathlete
- 1985 – Mike Rodgers, American sprinter
- 1986 – Aaron Cunningham, American baseball player
- 1987 – Ben Howard, English singer-songwriter and guitarist
- 1987 – Kris Letang, Canadian ice hockey player
- 1987 – Rein Taaramäe, Estonian cyclist
- 1987 – Jan Vertonghen, Belgian international footballer
- 1987 – Varun Dhawan, Indian actor
- 1989 – Elīna Babkina, Latvian basketball player
- 1989 – David Boudia, American diver
- 1989 – Taja Mohorčič, Slovenian tennis player
- 1990 – Kim Tae-ri, South Korean actress
- 1990 – Jan Veselý, Czech basketball player
- 1991 – Sigrid Agren, French-Swedish model
- 1991 – Morgan Ciprès, French figure skater
- 1991 – Batuhan Karadeniz, Turkish footballer
- 1992 – Laura Kenny, English cyclist
- 1992 – Jack Quaid, American actor
- 1993 – Ben Davies, Welsh international footballer
- 1994 – Jordan Fisher, American singer, dancer, and actor
- 1994 – Caspar Lee, British-South African YouTuber
- 1995 – Kehlani, American singer-songwriter
- 1996 – Ashleigh Barty, Australian tennis player
- 1997 – Lydia Ko, New Zealand golfer
- 1997 – Veronika Kudermetova, Russian tennis player
- 1998 – Ryan Newman, American actress
- 1999 – Ziyu He, Chinese violinist
- 1999 – Jerry Jeudy, American football player

== Deaths ==
=== Pre-1600 ===
- 624 – Mellitus, saint and archbishop of Canterbury
- 1149 – Petronille de Chemillé, abbess of Fontevrault
- 1288 – Gertrude of Austria (born 1226)
- 1338 – Theodore I, Marquess of Montferrat (born 1291)
- 1479 – Jorge Manrique, Spanish poet (born 1440)
- 1513 – Şehzade Ahmet, Ottoman prince (born 1465)

=== 1601–1900 ===
- 1617 – Concino Concini, Italian-French politician, Prime Minister of France (born 1575)
- 1622 – Fidelis of Sigmaringen, German friar and saint (born 1577)
- 1656 – Thomas Fincke, Danish mathematician and physicist (born 1561)
- 1692 – Johannes Zollikofer, Swiss vicar (born 1633)
- 1731 – Daniel Defoe, English journalist, novelist, and spy (born 1660)
- 1748 – Anton thor Helle, German-Estonian clergyman and translator (born 1683)
- 1779 – Eleazar Wheelock, American minister and academic, founded Dartmouth College (born 1711)
- 1794 – Axel von Fersen the Elder, Swedish field marshal and politician (born 1719)
- 1852 – Vasily Zhukovsky, Russian poet and translator (born 1783)
- 1889 – Zulma Carraud, French author (born 1796)
- 1891 – Helmuth von Moltke the Elder, German field marshal (born 1800)

=== 1901–present ===
- 1924 – G. Stanley Hall, American psychologist and academic (born 1844)
- 1931 – David Kldiashvili, Georgian author and playwright (born 1862)
- 1935 – Anastasios Papoulas, Greek general (born 1857)
- 1938 – George Grey Barnard, American sculptor (born 1863)
- 1939 – Louis Trousselier, French cyclist (born 1881)
- 1941 – Karin Boye, Swedish author and poet (born 1900)
- 1942 – Lucy Maud Montgomery, Canadian author (born 1874)
- 1944 – Charles Jordan, American magician (born 1888)
- 1945 – Ernst-Robert Grawitz, German physician and SS officer, facilitator of medical experiments on concentration camp inmates (born 1899)
- 1947 – Willa Cather, American novelist, short story writer, and poet (born 1873)
- 1948 – Jāzeps Vītols, Latvian composer (born 1863)
- 1954 – Guy Mairesse, French racing driver (born 1910)
- 1960 – Max von Laue, German physicist and academic, Nobel Prize laureate (born 1879)
- 1961 – Lee Moran, American actor, director and screenwriter (born 1888)
- 1962 – Milt Franklyn, American composer (born 1897)
- 1964 – Gerhard Domagk, German pathologist and bacteriologist (born 1895)
- 1965 – Louise Dresser, American actress (born 1878)
- 1966 – Simon Chikovani, Georgian poet and author (born 1902)
- 1967 – Vladimir Komarov, Russian pilot, engineer, and cosmonaut (born 1927)
- 1967 – Robert Richards, Australian politician, 32nd Premier of South Australia (born 1885)
- 1968 – Walter Tewksbury, American athlete (born 1876)
- 1970 – Otis Spann, American singer and pianist (born 1930)
- 1972 – Fernando Amorsolo, Filipino painter (born 1892)
- 1974 – Bud Abbott, American comedian and producer (born 1897)
- 1976 – Mark Tobey, American-Swiss painter and educator (born 1890)
- 1980 – Alejo Carpentier, Swiss-Cuban musicologist and author (born 1904)
- 1982 – Ville Ritola, Finnish runner (born 1896)
- 1983 – Erol Güngör, Turkish sociologist, psychologist, and academic (born 1938)
- 1983 – Rolf Stommelen, German racing driver (born 1943)
- 1984 – Rafael Pérez y Pérez, Spanish author (born 1891)
- 1986 – Wallis Simpson, American socialite, Duchess of Windsor, wife of the former King Edward VIII of the United Kingdom, Duke of Windsor (born 1896)
- 1993 – Oliver Tambo, South African lawyer and activist (born 1917)
- 1993 – Tran Duc Thao, Vietnamese philosopher and theorist (born 1917)
- 1995 – Lodewijk Bruckman, Dutch painter (born 1903)
- 1997 – Allan Francovich, American director and producer (born 1941)
- 1997 – Pat Paulsen, American comedian and activist (born 1927)
- 1997 – Eugene Stoner, American engineer, designed the AR-15 rifle (born 1922)
- 2001 – Josef Peters, German racing driver (born 1914)
- 2001 – Johnny Valentine, American wrestler (born 1928)
- 2002 – Lucien Wercollier, Luxembourgish sculptor (born 1908)
- 2003 – Nüzhet Gökdoğan, Turkish astronomer and mathematician (born 1910)
- 2004 – José Giovanni, French-Swiss director and producer (born 1923)
- 2004 – Estée Lauder, American businesswoman, co-founded Estée Lauder Companies (born 1906)
- 2005 – Ezer Weizman, Israeli general and politician, 7th President of Israel (born 1924)
- 2005 – Fei Xiaotong, Chinese sociologist and academic (born 1910)
- 2006 – Brian Labone, English footballer (born 1940)
- 2006 – Moshe Teitelbaum, Romanian-American rabbi and author (born 1914)
- 2008 – Jimmy Giuffre, American clarinet player, and saxophonist, and composer (born 1921)
- 2011 – Sathya Sai Baba, Indian guru and philanthropist (born 1926)
- 2014 – Hans Hollein, Austrian architect, designed Haas House (born 1934)
- 2014 – Sandy Jardine, Scottish footballer and manager (born 1948)
- 2014 – Shobha Nagi Reddy, Indian politician (born 1968)
- 2014 – Tadeusz Różewicz, Polish poet and playwright (born 1921)
- 2015 – Władysław Bartoszewski, Polish journalist and politician, Polish Minister of Foreign Affairs (born 1922)
- 2016 – Tommy Kono, American weightlifter and coach (born 1930)
- 2017 – Robert Pirsig, American author and philosopher (born 1928)
- 2022 – Andrew Woolfolk, American saxophonist (born 1950)
- 2023 – Wang Xiaolong, Chinese Coast guardsman (born 1995)
- 2024 – Bob Cole, Canadian sports announcer (born 1933)
- 2024 – Terry Hill, Australian rugby league player (born 1972)
- 2024 – Donald Payne Jr., American politician (born 1958)
- 2024 – Mike Pinder, British musician (born 1941)
- 2025 – Roy Phillips, British musician (born 1941)
- 2026 – Dirk Kempthorne, American businessman and politician, 49th United States Secretary of the Interior (born 1951)

== Holidays and observances ==
- Armenian Genocide Remembrance Day (Armenia, California, France)
- Christian feast day:
  - Benedict Menni
  - Dermot of Armagh
  - Dyfnan of Anglesey
  - Ecgberht of Ripon
  - Elizabeth Hesselblad
  - Fidelis of Sigmaringen
  - Gregory of Elvira
  - Ivo of Ramsey
  - Johann Walter (Lutheran)
  - Mary of Clopas
  - Mary Euphrasia Pelletier
  - Mellitus
  - Salome (disciple)
  - Wilfrid (Catholic Church and Church of England)
  - William Firmatus
  - April 24 (Eastern Orthodox liturgics)
- Concord Day (Niger)
- Democracy Day (Nepal)
- Fashion Revolution Day, and its related observances:
  - Labour Safety Day (Bangladesh, proposed)
- National Panchayati Raj Day (India)
- Republic Day (The Gambia)
- World Day for Laboratory Animals
