= Charles T. Jordan =

Charles T. Jordan may refer to:

- Charles Jordan (magician) (1888–1944), American magician
- Charlie Jordan (baseball) (1871–1928), Major League Baseball pitcher
