= 2024 Cleveland Browns season =

76th season in franchise history

- Owner: Jimmy Haslam
- General manager: Andrew Berry
- Head coach: Kevin Stefanski
- Home stadium: Huntington Bank Field

Results
- Record: 3–14
- Division place: 4th AFC North
- Playoffs: Did not qualify
- All-Pros: DE Myles Garrett (1st team)
- Pro Bowlers: DE Myles Garrett; WR Jerry Jeudy; CB Denzel Ward; G Joel Bitonio

Uniform
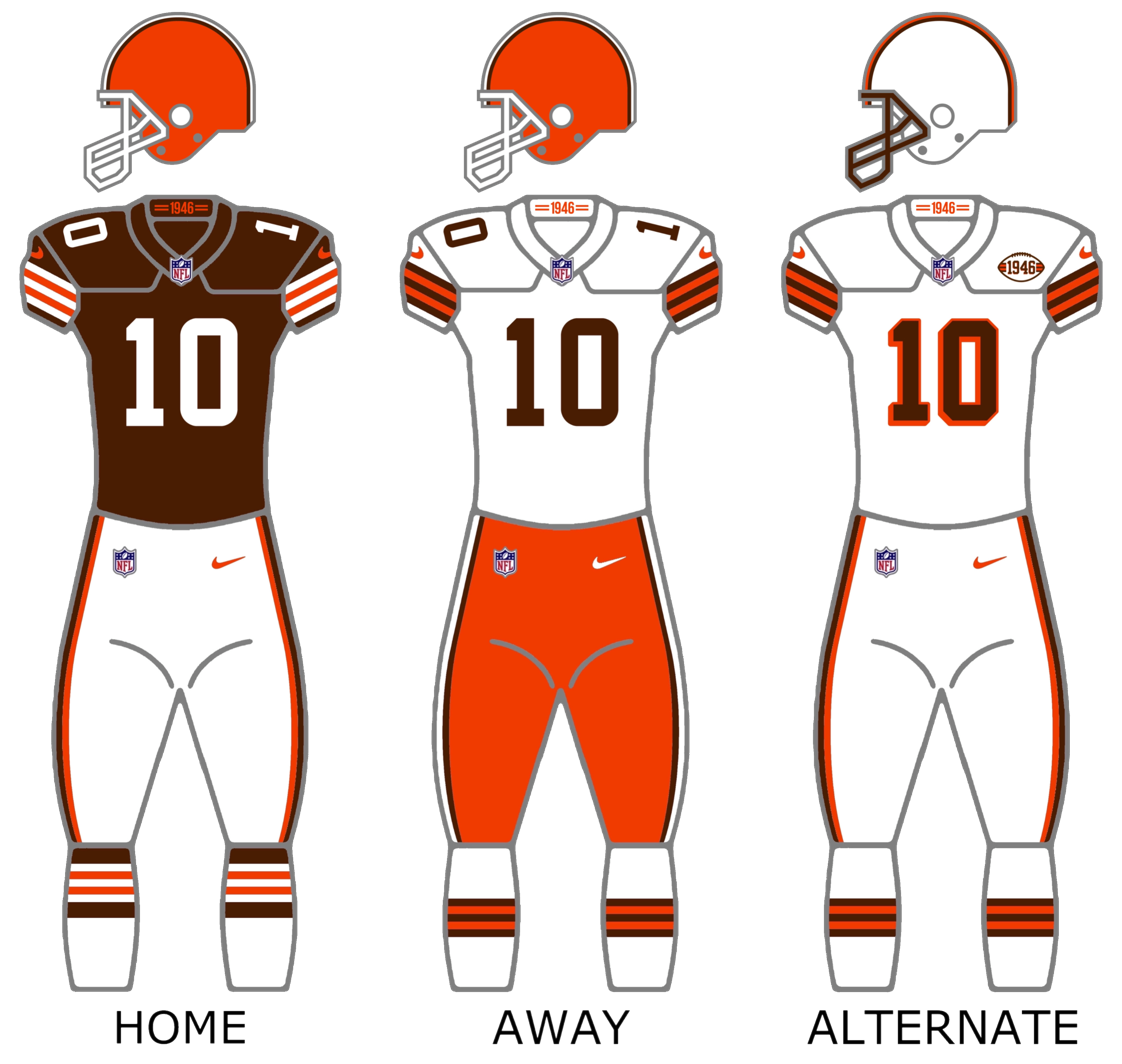

The 2024 season was the Cleveland Browns' 72nd as a member of the National Football League (NFL), their 76th overall, and their fifth under the head coach/general manager tandem of Kevin Stefanski and Andrew Berry. The Browns failed to improve on their 11–6 record from the previous season and failed to win the AFC North title, finishing with a 3–14 record. This extended their division title drought to 32 seasons, having last won the then-AFC Central in 1989. The Browns failed to return to the playoffs for the 20th time in 22 seasons after having qualified in 2023.

== Offseason ==
=== Staff changes ===
On January 17, the Browns fired offensive coordinator/quarterbacks coach Alex Van Pelt and running backs coach Stump Mitchell, and did not renew the contract of tight ends coach T. C. McCartney. On February 1, the Browns released offensive line coach Bill Callahan so he could take the same position with the Tennessee Titans, who had recently hired his son Brian as head coach. On February 13, it was announced that defensive line coach Ben Bloom was taking a role with the Tennessee Titans.

On January 24, the Browns hired Duce Staley as their running backs coach. Staley was previously the assistant head coach/running backs coach for the Carolina Panthers in 2023. On January 25, the Browns hired Tommy Rees as their tight ends coach/pass game specialist. Rees was previously the offensive coordinator/quarterbacks coach at Alabama in 2023. On January 27, the Browns hired Jacques Cesaire as their defensive line coach. Cesaire was previously the defensive line coach for the Houston Texans from 2022–2023. On January 28, the Browns hired Ken Dorsey as their offensive coordinator. Dorsey was previously the offensive coordinator for the Buffalo Bills from 2022–2023, and had played quarterback for the Browns from 2006–2008. On February 7, the Browns hired Andy Dickerson as their offensive line coach. Dickerson was previously the offensive line coach for the Seattle Seahawks from 2022–2023.

=== Roster changes ===
==== Free agents ====
Position	Player	Tag	2024 team	Date
LB	Matthew Adams	UFA	New York Giants	April 12
P	Corey Bojorquez	UFA	Cleveland Browns	March 15
TE	Harrison Bryant	UFA	Las Vegas Raiders	March 14
OT	Geron Christian	UFA	Tennessee Titans	June 12
QB	Jeff Driskel	UFA	Washington Commanders	April 1
G	Michael Dunn	UFA	Cleveland Browns	March 14
DT	Jordan Elliott	UFA	San Francisco 49ers	March 14
QB	Joe Flacco	UFA	Indianapolis Colts	March 22
CB	Mike Ford	UFA	Houston Texans	March 15
WR	Marquise Goodwin	UFA		
WR	Jakeem Grant	UFA	Atlanta Falcons	August 11
S	Duron Harmon	UFA		
C	Nick Harris	UFA	Seattle Seahawks	March 13
DT	Shelby Harris	UFA	Cleveland Browns	March 14
RB	Kareem Hunt	UFA	Kansas City Chiefs	September 17
DT	Maurice Hurst Jr.	UFA	Cleveland Browns	March 15
LB	Jordan Kunaszyk	UFA	Minnesota Vikings	August 13
S	Rodney McLeod	UFA	Cleveland Browns	March 25
LB	Jacob Phillips	UFA	Houston Texans	April 23
WR	James Proche	UFA	Cleveland Browns	March 19
DE	Za'Darius Smith	UFA	Cleveland Browns	March 13
LB	Sione Takitaki	UFA	New England Patriots	March 14
LB	Anthony Walker Jr.	UFA	Miami Dolphins	March 15
QB	P. J. Walker	UFA	Seattle Seahawks	June 10

==== Signings ====
Position	Player	2023 team	Date
OT	Hakeem Adeniji	Minnesota Vikings	March 13
C	Brian Allen	Los Angeles Rams	April 30
CB	Tony Brown	Indianapolis Colts	March 19
LB	Devin Bush Jr.	Seattle Seahawks	March 15
RB	D'Onta Foreman	Chicago Bears	March 22
CB	Justin Hardee	New York Jets	April 2
LB	Jordan Hicks	Minnesota Vikings	March 13
RB	Nyheim Hines	Buffalo Bills	March 13
QB	Tyler Huntley	Baltimore Ravens	March 20
OT	Germain Ifedi	Buffalo Bills	April 18
DE	Quinton Jefferson	New York Jets	March 19
FB	Giovanni Ricci	Carolina Panthers	March 15
QB	Jameis Winston	New Orleans Saints	March 20
K	Cade York	New York Giants	March 25

==== Trades ====
Date	Team	Player(s)/Asset(s) received	Player(s)/Asset(s) traded
March 13	Denver Broncos	WR Jerry Jeudy	2024 5th round selection 2024 6th round selection
April 12	Tennessee Titans	2024 7th round selection	T Leroy Watson
August 11	Seattle Seahawks	C Nick Harris; 2026 7th round selection	2026 6th round selection
August 22	Washington Commanders	~~2025 7th round selection~~	K Cade York
August 24	Chicago Bears	2025 6th round selection	DT Chris Williams; 2025 7th round selection

==== Draft ====
2024 Cleveland Browns draft selections
Round	Selection	Player	Position	College	Notes
1	23	Traded to the Houston Texans (Note: The Browns traded first- and fourth-round selections (23rd and 123rd overall), 2023 first- and third-round selections (12th and 73rd overall) and 2022 first- and fourth-round selections (13th and 107th overall) to the Houston Texans in exchange for a sixth-round selection (203rd overall) and QB Deshaun Watson.)			
2	54	Mike Hall Jr.	DT	Ohio State	
3	85	Zak Zinter	G	Michigan	
4	123	Traded to the Houston Texans			
5	136	Traded to the Denver Broncos (Note: The Browns traded fifth- and sixth-round selections (136th and 203rd overall) to the Denver Broncos in exchange for WR Jerry Jeudy.)			From Panthers (Note: The Browns traded QB Baker Mayfield to the Carolina Panthers in exchange for a fifth-round selection (136th overall).)
5	156	Jamari Thrash	WR	Louisville	From Eagles via Cardinals (Note: The Browns traded a seventh-round selection (230th overall) and QB Joshua Dobbs to the Arizona Cardinals in exchange for a fifth-round selection (156th overall).)
5	157	Traded to the Minnesota Vikings (Note: The Browns traded a fifth-round selection (157th overall) and a 2025 fifth-round selection to the Minnesota Vikings in exchange for 2025 sixth- and seventh-round selections, and DE Za'Darius Smith.)			
6	197	Traded to the Atlanta Falcons (Note: The Browns traded a sixth-round selection (197th overall) to the Atlanta Falcons in exchange for a seventh-round selection (230th overall) and LB Deion Jones.)			
6	203	Traded to the Denver Broncos			From Texans
6	206	Nathaniel Watson	LB	Mississippi State	From Ravens (Note: The Browns traded a 2023 seventh-round selection (229th overall) to the Baltimore Ravens in exchange for a sixth-round selection (206th overall).)
7	227	Myles Harden	CB	South Dakota	From Titans (Note: The Browns traded OT Leroy Watson IV to the Tennessee Titans in exchange for a seventh-round selection (227th overall).)
7	230	Traded to the Arizona Cardinals			From Falcons
7	243	Jowon Briggs	DT	Cincinnati	

2024 Cleveland Browns undrafted free agents
Name	Position	College	Ref.
Ahmarean Brown	WR	South Carolina	
Javion Cohen	G	Miami (FL)	
Chris Edmonds	S	Arizona State	
DyShawn Gales	CB	South Dakota State	
Winston Reid	LB	Weber State	
Aidan Robbins	RB	BYU	
Lorenzo Thompson	OT	Rhode Island	
Treyton Welch	TE	Wyoming	
Jacob Sirmon	QB	Northern Colorado	
Chase Williams	S	San Jose State	

Draft trades

== Personnel ==
=== Staff / Coaches ===
2024 Cleveland Browns staff
Front office: Owners – Jimmy Haslam, Dee Haslam, Whitney Haslam Johnson, J. W. Johnson; Chief strategy officer – Paul DePodesta; Executive vice president/COO – David Jenkins; Executive vice president of football operations/general manager – Andrew Berry; Assistant general manager/vice president of football operations – Catherine Hickman; Assistant general manager/vice president of player personnel – Glenn Cook; Vice president of football administration – Chris Cooper; Vice president of research and strategy – Andrew Healy; Vice president of player personnel process and development – Ken Kovash; Director of football administration – Taylor Young; Director of player personnel – Dan Saganey; Director of pro scouting – Adam Al-Khayyal; Director of college scouting – Max Paulus; Senior personnel/coaching executive – Bob Quinn; Senior executive advisor to the GM – Jimmy Raye III; Advisor to the GM – Chris Polian; Director of football operations – Tyler Hamblin; Director of football operations & process – Joy Tapajcik; Director of research and strategy – Dave Giuliani; Director of scouting research – Mike Cetta; Director of football information systems – Brad DeAngelis; Coaching and personnel consultant – Mike Vrabel; Head coaches: Head coach – Kevin Stefanski; Assistant head coach/special teams coordinator – Ray Ventrone; Offensive coaches: Offensive coordinator – Ken Dorsey; Senior offensive assistant – Bill Musgrave; Running backs – Duce Staley; Pass game coordinator/wide receivers – Chad O'Shea; Assistant wide receivers – Callie Brownson; Pass game specialist/tight ends – Tommy Rees; Offensive line – Andy Dickerson; Assistant offensive line – Roy Istvan; Offensive assistant/run game specialist – Nick Charlton; Offensive assistant/quarterbacks – Ashton Grant; Bill Willis diversity coaching fellow – Nemo Washington	Defensive coaches: Defensive coordinator – Jim Schwartz; Defensive line – Jacques Cesaire; Assistant defensive line – Jordan Thomas; Linebackers – Jason Tarver; Cornerbacks – Brandon Lynch; Safeties – Ephraim Banda; Defensive assistant – Zach Dunn; Defensive quality control – Jeff Anderson; Special teams coaches: Assistant special teams – Stephen Bravo-Brown; Strength and conditioning: Director of high performance – Shaun Huls; Director of strength and conditioning – Larry Jackson; Assistant strength and conditioning/sports science – Josh Christovich; Assistant strength and conditioning – Monty Gibson; Assistant strength and conditioning – Dale Jones; Assistant strength and conditioning – Evan Marcus; Director of performance nutrition – Katy Meassick

=== Final roster ===
2024 Cleveland Browns roster
Quarterbacks (QB): 17 Dorian Thompson-Robinson; 5 Jameis Winston; 2 Bailey Zappe; Running backs (RB): 27 D'Onta Foreman; 42 John Kelly; Wide receivers (WR): 89 Kaden Davis; 3 Jerry Jeudy; 8 Elijah Moore; 11 James Proche; 80 Jamari Thrash; 81 Michael Woods II; Tight ends (TE): 88 Jordan Akins; 82 Brenden Bates; 86 Blake Whiteheart	Offensive linemen (OL): 75 Joel Bitonio G; 64 Geron Christian T; 78 Jack Conklin T; 68 Michael Dunn G; 65 Germain Ifedi T; 55 Ethan Pocic C; 77 Wyatt Teller G; 70 Zak Zinter G; Defensive linemen (DL): 97 Jowon Briggs DT; 62 Michael Dwumfour DT; 95 Myles Garrett DE; 51 Mike Hall Jr. DT; 96 James Houston DE; 92 Sam Kamara DT/DE; 57 Isaiah McGuire DE; 54 Ogbo Okoronkwo DE; 99 Cameron Thomas DE; 94 Dalvin Tomlinson DT	Linebackers (LB): 30 Devin Bush Jr. MLB; 43 Mohamoud Diabate OLB; 58 Jordan Hicks MLB; 39 Khaleke Hudson OLB; 59 Winston Reid OLB; 40 Nathaniel Watson MLB; Defensive backs (DB): 35 Chigozie Anusiem CB; 37 D'Anthony Bell FS; 22 Grant Delpit SS; 41 Chris Edmonds SS; 23 Martin Emerson CB; 31 Mike Ford CB; 26 Myles Harden CB; 33 Ronnie Hickman FS; 12 Rodney McLeod SS; 29 Cameron Mitchell CB; 1 Juan Thornhill FS; 21 Denzel Ward CB; Special teams (ST): 13 Corey Bojorquez P; 7 Dustin Hopkins K; 50 Rex Sunahara LS	Practice squad: 67 Javion Cohen G; 28 Trey Dean SS; 83 Jaelen Gill WR; 25 Kahlef Hailassie CB; 98 Marcus Haynes DE; 36 Jacob Kibodi RB; 44 Cameron Latu TE; 61 Roy Mbaeteka T (IPP); 87 Tre' McKitty TE; 60 Julian Pearl T; 49 Aidan Robbins RB; 52 Elerson Smith DE; 69 Lorenzo Thompson T; 64 Cameron Tom C; Reserve: 74 Hakeem Adeniji T (IR); 18 David Bell WR (IR); 38 Tony Brown CB (IR); 24 Nick Chubb RB (IR); 34 Jerome Ford RB (IR); 53 Nick Harris C (IR); 93 Shelby Harris DT (IR); 22 Nyheim Hines RB (IR); 66 James Hudson T (IR); 47 Charley Hughlett LS (IR); 90 Maurice Hurst II DT (IR); 79 Dawand Jones T (IR); 0 Greg Newsome II CB (IR); 85 David Njoku TE (IR); 28 Jeremiah Owusu-Koramoah OLB (IR); 20 Pierre Strong Jr. RB (IR); 84 Geoff Swaim TE (IR); 19 Cedric Tillman WR (IR); 4 Deshaun Watson QB (IR); 71 Jedrick Wills T (IR); 91 Alex Wright DE (IR); 56 Luke Wypler C/G (IR); Rookies in italics 53 active, 22 reserve, 13 practice squad (1 exempt)

== Preseason ==
=== Schedule ===
Week	Date	Opponent	Result	Record	Venue	Recap
1	August 10	Green Bay Packers	L 10–23	0–1	Cleveland Browns Stadium	Recap
2	August 17	Minnesota Vikings	L 12–27	0–2	Cleveland Browns Stadium	Recap
3	August 24	at Seattle Seahawks	L 33–37	0–3	Lumen Field	Recap

=== Game summaries ===
==== Preseason Week 1: vs. Green Bay Packers ====
Preseason Week 1: Green Bay Packers at Cleveland Browns – Game summary

Quarter	1	2	3	4	Total
Packers	7	10	6	0	23
Browns	3	0	0	7	10

at Cleveland Browns Stadium, Cleveland, Ohio

- Date: August 10
- Game time: 4:25 p.m. EDT
- Game weather: Cloudy, 75 °F (24 °C)
- Game attendance: 67,117
- Referee: John Hussey
- TV announcers (WEWS): Chris Rose, Nathan Zegura and Aditi Kinkhabwala
- Recap, Game Book

Game information

First quarter

- GB – Dontayvion Wicks 65-yard pass from Jordan Love (Anders Carlson kick), 13:38. Packers 7–0. Drive: 3 plays, 70 yards, 1:22.
- CLE – Cade York 55-yard field goal, 8:46. Packers 7–3. Drive: 9 plays, 27 yards, 4:52.

Second quarter

- GB – Emanuel Wilson 5-yard run (Greg Joseph kick), 2:48. Packers 14–3. Drive: 13 plays, 77 yards, 6:20.
- GB – Anders Carlson 46-yard field goal, 0:00. Packers 17–3. Drive: 8 plays, 36 yards, 0:58.

Third quarter

- GB – Greg Joseph 35-yard field goal, 12:10. Packers 20–3. Drive: 6 plays, 21 yards, 2:36.
- GB – Anders Carlson 33-yard field goal, 6:35. Packers 23–3. Drive: 8 plays, 50 yards, 3:48.

Fourth quarter

- CLE – Aidan Robbins 1-yard run (Cade York kick), 5:08. Packers 23–10. Drive: 13 plays, 66 yards, 7:01.

Top passers

- GB – Sean Clifford – 10/19, 111 yards
- CLE – Dorian Thompson-Robinson – 14/18, 134 yards

Top rushers

- GB – Emanuel Wilson – 13 rushes, 67 yards, TD
- CLE – John Kelly – 4 rushes, 15 yards

Top receivers

- GB – Grant DuBose – 5 receptions, 66 yards
- CLE – Jamari Thrash – 3 receptions, 43 yards

==== Preseason Week 2: vs. Minnesota Vikings ====
Preseason Week 2: Minnesota Vikings at Cleveland Browns – Game summary

Quarter	1	2	3	4	Total
Vikings	10	3	7	7	27
Browns	7	0	3	2	12

at Cleveland Browns Stadium, Cleveland, Ohio

- Date: August 17
- Game time: 4:25 p.m. EDT
- Game weather: Cloudy, 83 °F (28 °C)
- Game attendance: 68,035
- Referee: Clete Blakeman
- TV announcers (WEWS): Chris Rose, Nathan Zegura and Aditi Kinkhabwala
- Recap, Game Book

Game information

First quarter

- MIN – Trishton Jackson 14-yard pass from Nick Mullens (Will Reichard kick), 11:45. Vikings 7–0. Drive: 8 plays, 75 yards, 3:15.
- CLE – D'Onta Foreman 1-yard run (Cade York kick), 7:18. Tied 7–7. Drive: 8 plays, 69 yards, 4:27.
- MIN – Will Reichard 41-yard field goal, 4:26. Vikings 10–7. Drive: 9 plays, 47 yards, 2:52.

Second quarter

- MIN – Will Reichard 38-yard field goal, 7:41. Vikings 13–7. Drive: 11 plays, 39 yards, 4:17.

Third quarter

- MIN – Malik Knowles 1-yard pass from Jaren Hall (Will Reichard kick), 10:14. Vikings 20–7. Drive: 2 plays, 8 yards, 0:44.
- CLE – Cade York 33-yard field goal, 2:08. Vikings 20–10. Drive: 13 plays, 55 yards, 8:06.

Fourth quarter

- MIN – Jeshaun Jones 71-yard pass from Jaren Hall (Will Reichard kick), 10:20. Vikings 27–10. Drive: 5 plays, 94 yards, 2:42.
- CLE – Matt Corral fumble forced by Chris Williams out of bounds in the end zone for a safety, 1:54. Vikings 27–12.

Top passers

- MIN – Nick Mullens – 11/21, 135 yards, TD
- CLE – Tyler Huntley – 14/20, 135 yards, 2 INT

Top rushers

- MIN – Myles Gaskin – 9 carries, 45 yards
- CLE – Tyler Huntley – 4 carries, 19 yards

Top receivers

- MIN – Jeshaun Jones – 1 reception, 71 yards, TD
- CLE – Zaire Mitchell-Paden – 4 receptions, 59 yards

==== Preseason Week 3: at Seattle Seahawks ====
Preseason Week 3: Cleveland Browns at Seattle Seahawks – Game summary

Quarter	1	2	3	4	Total
Browns	0	13	7	13	33
Seahawks	7	17	10	3	37

at Lumen Field, Seattle, Washington

- Date: August 24
- Game time: 10:00 p.m. EDT
- Game weather: Cloudy, 63 °F (17 °C)
- Game attendance: 68,190
- Referee: Clay Martin
- TV announcers (WEWS): Chris Rose, Nathan Zegura and Aditi Kinkhabwala
- Recap, Game Book

Game information

First quarter

- SEA – DK Metcalf 21-yard pass from Geno Smith (Jason Myers kick), 9:50. Seahawks 7–0. Drive: 5 plays, 62 yards, 1:59.

Second quarter

- CLE – Dustin Hopkins 37-yard field goal, 13:12. Seahawks 7–3. Drive: 10 plays, 35 yards, 3:43.
- SEA – Kenny McIntosh 56-yard run (Jason Myers kick), 11:42. Seahawks 14–3. Drive: 3 plays, 73 yards, 1:30.
- CLE – Jamari Thrash 46-yard pass from Dorian Thompson-Robinson (Lucas Havrisik kick), 10:31. Seahawks 14–10. Drive: 4 plays, 70 yards, 1:11.
- SEA – Jason Myers 58-yard field goal, 5:22. Seahawks 17–10. Drive: 9 plays, 33 yards, 5:09.
- SEA – D'Wayne Eskridge 79-yard punt return (Jason Myers kick), 4:04. Seahawks 24–10.
- CLE – Lucas Havrisik 49-yard field goal, 0:00. Seahawks 24–13. Drive: 10 plays, 39 yards, 4:04.

Third quarter

- SEA – Jason Myers 47-yard field goal, 11:53. Seahawks 27–13. Drive: 6 plays, 42 yards, 3:07.
- CLE – James Proche 6-yard pass from Tyler Huntley (Lucas Havrisik kick), 5:45. Seahawks 27–20. Drive: 5 plays, 33 yards, 1:53.
- SEA – George Holani 1-yard run (Jason Myers kick), 1:54. Seahawks 34–20. Drive: 7 plays, 70 yards, 3:51.

Fourth quarter

- CLE – Michael Woods II 12-yard pass from Tyler Huntley (pass failed), 14:55. Seahawks 34–26. Drive: 4 plays, 68 yards, 1:59.
- SEA – Jason Myers 51-yard field goal, 7:51. Seahawks 37–26. Drive: 4 plays, 5 yards, 1:19.
- CLE – Michael Woods II 15-yard pass from Tyler Huntley (Lucas Havrisik kick), 0:08. Seahawks 37–33. Drive: 12 plays, 67 yards, 4:31.

Passing

- CLE – Tyler Huntley – 17/22, 146 yards, 3 TD
- SEA – Geno Smith – 4/5, 62 yards, TD

Rushing

- CLE – Aidan Robbins – 8 carries, 38 yards
- SEA – Kenny McIntosh – 1 carry, 56 yards, TD

Receiving

- CLE – Jamari Thrash – 4 receptions, 73 yards, TD
- SEA – Jaxon Smith-Njigba – 2 receptions, 32 yards

== Regular season ==
=== Schedule ===
Week	Date	Opponent	Result	Record	Venue	Recap
1	September 8	Dallas Cowboys	**L** 17–33	0–1	Huntington Bank Field	Recap
2	September 15	at Jacksonville Jaguars	**W** 18–13	1–1	EverBank Stadium	Recap
3	September 22	New York Giants	**L** 15–21	1–2	Huntington Bank Field	Recap
4	September 29	at Las Vegas Raiders	**L** 16–20	1–3	Allegiant Stadium	Recap
5	October 6	at Washington Commanders	**L** 13–34	1–4	Northwest Stadium	Recap
6	October 13	at Philadelphia Eagles	**L** 16–20	1–5	Lincoln Financial Field	Recap
7	October 20	**Cincinnati Bengals**	**L** 14–21	1–6	Huntington Bank Field	Recap
8	October 27	**Baltimore Ravens**	**W** 29–24	2–6	Huntington Bank Field	Recap
9	November 3	Los Angeles Chargers	**L** 10–27	2–7	Huntington Bank Field	Recap
10	Bye					
11	November 17	at New Orleans Saints	**L** 14–35	2–8	Caesars Superdome	Recap
12	November 21	**Pittsburgh Steelers**	**W** 24–19	3–8	Huntington Bank Field	Recap
13	December 2	at Denver Broncos	**L** 32–41	3–9	Empower Field at Mile High	Recap
14	December 8	at **Pittsburgh Steelers**	**L** 14–27	3–10	Acrisure Stadium	Recap
15	December 15	Kansas City Chiefs	**L** 7–21	3–11	Huntington Bank Field	Recap
16	December 22	at **Cincinnati Bengals**	**L** 6–24	3–12	Paycor Stadium	Recap
17	December 29	Miami Dolphins	**L** 3–20	3–13	Huntington Bank Field	Recap
18	January 4	at **Baltimore Ravens**	**L** 10–35	3–14	M&T Bank Stadium	Recap

Note: Intra-division opponents are in bold text.

=== Game summaries ===
==== Week 1: vs. Dallas Cowboys ====
Week 1: Dallas Cowboys at Cleveland Browns – Game summary

Quarter	1	2	3	4	Total
**Cowboys**	7	13	10	3	**33**
Browns	3	0	7	7	**17**

at Huntington Bank Field, Cleveland, Ohio

- Date: September 8
- Game time: 4:25 p.m. EDT
- Game weather: Sunny, 68 °F (20 °C)
- Game attendance: 67,431
- Referee: Clete Blakeman
- TV announcers (Fox): Kevin Burkhardt, Tom Brady, Erin Andrews and Tom Rinaldi
- Recap, Game Book

Game information

**First quarter**

- CLE – Dustin Hopkins 51-yard field goal, 9:23. Browns 3–0. **Drive: 6 plays, 13 yards, 3:16.**
- DAL – Brandin Cooks 21-yard pass from Dak Prescott, 6:55. Cowboys 7–3. **Drive: 6 plays, 70 yards, 2:28.**

**Second quarter**

- DAL – Ezekiel Elliott 3-yard run (Brandon Aubrey kick), 5:15. Cowboys 14–3. **Drive: 11 plays, 78 yards, 5:56.**
- DAL – Brandon Aubrey 57-yard field goal, 2:06. Cowboys 17–3. **Drive: 5 plays, 17 yards, 2:28.**
- DAL – Brandon Aubrey 40-yard field goal, 0:51. Cowboys 20–3. **Drive: 4 plays, 1 yard, 0:55.**

**Third quarter**

- DAL – KaVontae Turpin 60-yard punt return (Brandon Aubrey kick), 12:59. Cowboys 27–3. **Drive: 3 plays, -14 yards, 2:01.**
- CLE – Jerry Jeudy 6-yard pass from Deshaun Watson (Dustin Hopkins kick), 8:42. Cowboys 27–10. **Drive: 12 plays, 75 yards, 4:17.**
- DAL – Brandon Aubrey 50-yard field goal, 1:27. Cowboys 30–10. **Drive: 6 plays, 14 yards, 2:28.**

**Fourth quarter**

- DAL – Brandon Aubrey 46-yard field goal, 11:51. Cowboys 33–10. **Drive: 6 plays, 10 yards, 2:16.**
- CLE – Jerome Ford 2-yard run (Dustin Hopkins kick), 0:29. Cowboys 33–17. **Drive: 15 plays, 64 yards, 6:53.**

**Top passers**

- DAL – Dak Prescott – 19/32, 179 yards, TD
- CLE – Deshaun Watson – 24/45, 169 yards, TD, 2 INT

**Top rushers**

- DAL – Ezekiel Elliott – 10 rushes, 40 yards, TD
- CLE – Jerome Ford – 12 rushes, 44 yards, TD

**Top receivers**

- DAL – CeeDee Lamb – 5 receptions, 61 yards
- CLE – David Njoku – 4 receptions, 44 yards

With the loss, the Browns started the season 0–1.

==== Week 2: at Jacksonville Jaguars ====
Week 2: Cleveland Browns at Jacksonville Jaguars – Game summary

Quarter	1	2	3	4	Total
**Browns**	7	6	3	2	**18**
Jaguars	0	3	7	3	**13**

at EverBank Stadium, Jacksonville, Florida

- Date: September 15
- Game time: 1:00 p.m. EDT
- Game weather: Cloudy, 80 °F (27 °C)
- Game attendance: 60,105
- Referee: Adrian Hill
- TV announcers (CBS): Chris Lewis, Jason McCourty and Amanda Guerra
- Recap, Game Book

Game information

**First quarter**

- CLE – Deshaun Watson 1-yard run (Dustin Hopkins kick), 2:29. Browns 7–0. **Drive: 16 plays, 89 yards, 9:14.**

**Second quarter**

- CLE – Dustin Hopkins 53-yard field goal, 9:52. Browns 10–0. **Drive: 12 plays, 41 yards, 6:35.**
- JAX – Cam Little 22-yard field goal, 4:44. Browns 10–3. **Drive: 11 plays, 66 yards, 5:08.**
- CLE – Dustin Hopkins 38-yard field goal, 0:27. Browns 13–3. **Drive: 8 plays, 52 yards, 4:17.**

**Third quarter**

- CLE – Dustin Hopkins 44-yard field goal, 10:20. Browns 16–3. **Drive: 6 plays, 23 yards, 2:16.**
- JAX – Travis Etienne 4-yard run (Cam Little kick), 1:11. Browns 16–10. **Drive: 3 plays, 72 yards, 1:18.**

**Fourth quarter**

- JAX – Cam Little 25-yard field goal, 7:32. Browns 16–13. **Drive: 13 plays, 83 yards, 6:42.**
- CLE – Trevor Lawrence sacked in end zone for a safety, 1:44. Browns 18–13.

**Top passers**

- CLE – Deshaun Watson – 22/34, 186 yards
- JAX – Trevor Lawrence – 14/30, 220 yards

**Top rushers**

- CLE – Jerome Ford – 7 rushes, 64 yards
- JAX – Travis Etienne – 13 rushes, 52 yards, TD

**Top receivers**

- CLE – Jerry Jeudy – 5 receptions, 73 yards
- JAX – Brian Thomas Jr. – 2 receptions, 94 yards

With the win, the Browns improved to 1–1.

==== Week 3: vs. New York Giants ====
Week 3: New York Giants at Cleveland Browns – Game summary

Quarter	1	2	3	4	Total
**Giants**	7	14	0	0	**21**
Browns	7	0	0	8	**15**

at Huntington Bank Field, Cleveland, Ohio

- Date: September 22
- Game time: 1:00 p.m. EDT
- Game weather: Cloudy, 76 °F (24 °C)
- Game attendance: 68,016
- Referee: Craig Wrolstad
- TV announcers (Fox): Kenny Albert, Jonathan Vilma and Megan Olivi
- Recap, Game Book

Game information

**First quarter**

- CLE – Amari Cooper 24-yard pass from Deshaun Watson (Dustin Hopkins kick), 14:49. Browns 7–0. **Drive: 1 play, 24 yards, 0:06.**
- NYG – Devin Singletary 1-yard run (Greg Joseph kick), 2:07. Tied 7–7. **Drive: 13 plays, 81 yards, 7:44.**

**Second quarter**

- NYG – Malik Nabers 3-yard pass from Daniel Jones (Greg Joseph kick), 1:44. Giants 14–7. **Drive: 14 plays, 93 yards, 6:51.**
- NYG – Malik Nabers 5-yard pass from Daniel Jones (Greg Joseph kick), 0:11. Giants 21–7. **Drive: 4 plays, 30 yards, 0:21.**

**Third quarter**

- No scoring plays.

**Fourth quarter**

- CLE – Amari Cooper 6-yard pass from Deshaun Watson (Deshaun Watson–Jerry Jeudy pass), 11:33. Giants 21–15. **Drive: 5 plays, 49 yards, 2:07.**

**Top passers**

- NYG – Daniel Jones – 24/34, 236 yards, 2 TD
- CLE – Deshaun Watson – 21/37, 196 yards, 2 TD

**Top rushers**

- NYG – Devin Singletary – 16 rushes, 65 yards, TD
- CLE – Jerome Ford – 10 rushes, 37 yards

**Top receivers**

- NYG – Malik Nabers – 8 receptions, 78 yards, 2 TD
- CLE – Amari Cooper – 7 receptions, 86 yards, 2 TD

Despite scoring a touchdown on the first play of the game thanks to Eric Gray fumbling on the opening kickoff, the Browns ended up losing to the Giants 21–15, falling to 1–2.

==== Week 4: at Las Vegas Raiders ====
Week 4: Cleveland Browns at Las Vegas Raiders – Game summary

Quarter	1	2	3	4	Total
Browns	10	0	0	6	**16**
**Raiders**	0	10	10	0	**20**

at Allegiant Stadium, Paradise, Nevada

- Date: September 29
- Game time: 4:25 p.m. EDT/1:25 p.m. PDT
- Game weather: None (indoor stadium)
- Game attendance: 62,401
- Referee: Brad Allen
- TV announcers (CBS): Beth Mowins, Jay Feely, Ross Tucker and Tiffany Blackmon
- Recap, Game Book

Game information

**First quarter**

- CLE – Blake Whiteheart 1-yard pass from Deshaun Watson (Dustin Hopkins kick), 5:38. Browns 7–0. **Drive: 15 plays, 70 yards, 9:22.**
- CLE – Dustin Hopkins 56-yard field goal, 0:35. Browns 10–0. **Drive: 6 plays, 17 yards, 3:20.**

**Second quarter**

- LV – Tre Tucker 3-yard run (Daniel Carlson kick), 9:50. Browns 10–7. **Drive: 11 plays, 70 yards, 5:45.**
- LV – Daniel Carlson 52-yard field goal, 2:52. Tied 10–10. **Drive: 9 plays, 45 yards, 5:06.**

**Third quarter**

- LV – Daniel Carlson 34-yard field goal, 11:28. Raiders 13–10. **Drive: 8 plays, 55 yards, 3:32.**
- LV – D. J. Turner 18-yard run (Daniel Carlson kick), 5:23. Raiders 20–10. **Drive: 6 plays, 52 yards, 2:36.**

**Fourth quarter**

- CLE – Rodney McLeod 25-yard fumble return (Dustin Hopkins kick), 14:50. Raiders 20–16. **Drive: 3 plays, 5 yards, 1:39.**

**Top passers**

- CLE – Deshaun Watson – 24/32, 176 yards, TD, INT
- LV – Gardner Minshew – 14/24, 130 yards

**Top rushers**

- CLE – Jerome Ford – 10 rushes, 58 yards
- LV – Alexander Mattison – 5 rushes, 60 yards

**Top receivers**

- CLE – Jerry Jeudy – 6 receptions, 72 yards
- LV – Jakobi Meyers – 5 receptions, 49 yards

With the loss, the Browns fell to 1–3.

==== Week 5: at Washington Commanders ====
Week 5: Cleveland Browns at Washington Commanders – Game summary

Quarter	1	2	3	4	Total
Browns	0	3	3	7	**13**
**Commanders**	7	17	10	0	**34**

at Northwest Stadium, Landover, Maryland

- Date: October 6
- Game time: 1:00 p.m. EDT
- Game weather: Sunny, 73 °F (23 °C)
- Game attendance: 59,030
- Referee: Alan Eck
- TV announcers (Fox): Jason Benetti, Greg Olsen and Pam Oliver
- Recap, Game Book

Game information

**First quarter**

- WAS – Brian Robinson Jr. 4-yard run (Austin Seibert kick), 2:40. Commanders 7–0. **Drive: 6 plays, 34 yards, 3:25.**

**Second quarter**

- CLE – Dustin Hopkins 51-yard field goal, 13:08. Commanders 7–3. **Drive: 6 plays, 10 yards, 1:52.**
- WAS – Austin Seibert 27-yard field goal, 8:41. Commanders 10–3. **Drive: 8 plays, 71 yards, 4:27.**
- WAS – Brian Robinson Jr. 1-yard run (Austin Seibert kick), 3:11. Commanders 17–3. **Drive: 10 plays, 74 yards, 3:37.**
- WAS – Dyami Brown 41-yard pass from Jayden Daniels (Austin Seibert kick), 0:36. Commanders 24–3. **Drive: 5 plays, 62 yards, 0:59.**

**Third quarter**

- CLE – Dustin Hopkins 31-yard field goal, 12:12. Commanders 24–6. **Drive: 6 plays, 17 yards, 2:40.**
- WAS – Jeremy McNichols 3-yard run (Austin Seibert kick), 7:23. Commanders 31–6. **Drive: 9 plays, 80 yards, 4:49.**
- WAS – Austin Seibert 30-yard field goal, 2:35. Commanders 34–6. **Drive: 7 plays, 38 yards, 3:13.**

**Fourth quarter**

- CLE – Jordan Akins 10-yard pass from Deshaun Watson (Dustin Hopkins kick), 7:02. Commanders 34–13. **Drive: 9 plays, 54 yards, 4:49.**

**Top passers**

- CLE – Deshaun Watson – 15/28, 125 yards, TD
- WAS – Jayden Daniels – 14/25, 238 yards, TD, INT

**Top rushers**

- CLE – Jerome Ford – 9 rushes, 47 yards
- WAS – Jayden Daniels – 11 rushes, 82 yards

**Top receivers**

- CLE – Amari Cooper – 4 receptions, 60 yards
- WAS – Terry McLaurin – 4 receptions, 112 yards

With the loss, the Browns fell to 1–4.

==== Week 6: at Philadelphia Eagles ====
Week 6: Cleveland Browns at Philadelphia Eagles – Game summary

Quarter	1	2	3	4	Total
Browns	0	10	0	6	**16**
**Eagles**	0	10	3	7	**20**

at Lincoln Financial Field, Philadelphia, Pennsylvania

- Date: October 13
- Game time: 1:00 p.m. EDT
- Game weather: Clear, 75 °F (24 °C)
- Game attendance: 69,879
- Referee: Shawn Hochuli
- TV announcers (Fox): Kenny Albert, Jonathan Vilma and Megan Olivi
- Recap, Game Book

Game information

**First quarter**

- No scoring plays.

**Second quarter**

- PHI – Jake Elliott 49-yard field goal, 13:02. Eagles 3–0. **Drive: 14 plays, 58 yards, 6:48.**
- PHI – A. J. Brown 22-yard pass from Jalen Hurts (Jake Elliott kick), Eagles 10–0. **Drive: 10 plays, 84 yards, 4:46.**
- CLE – Dustin Hopkins 43-yard field goal, 1:58. Eagles 10–3. **Drive: 10 plays, 45 yards, 5:19.**
- CLE – Rodney McLeod 50-yard return of blocked field goal (Dustin Hopkins kick), 0:14. Tied 10–10. **Drive: 6 plays, 33 yards, 1:44.**

**Third quarter**

- PHI – Jake Elliott 44-yard field goal, 2:50. Eagles 13–10. **Drive: 7 plays, 27 yards, 3:57.**

**Fourth quarter**

- CLE – Dustin Hopkins 49-yard field goal, 9:49. Tied 13–13. **Drive: 12 plays, 39 yards, 8:01.**
- PHI – DeVonta Smith 45-yard pass from Jalen Hurts (Jake Elliott kick), 7:54. Eagles 20–13. **Drive: 4 plays, 70 yards, 1:55.**
- CLE – Dustin Hopkins 31-yard field goal, 3:54. Eagles 20–16. **Drive: 9 plays, 57 yards, 4:00.**

**Top passers**

- CLE – Deshaun Watson – 16/23, 168 yards
- PHI – Jalen Hurts – 16/25, 264 yards, 2 TD

**Top rushers**

- CLE – Pierre Strong Jr. – 8 rushes, 43 yards
- PHI – Saquon Barkley – 18 rushes, 47 yards

**Top receivers**

- CLE – Amari Cooper – 4 receptions, 42 yards
- PHI – A. J. Brown – 6 receptions, 116 yards, TD

With their fourth straight loss, the Browns fell to 1–5.

==== Week 7: vs. Cincinnati Bengals ====
Week 7: Cincinnati Bengals at Cleveland Browns – Game summary

Quarter	1	2	3	4	Total
**Bengals**	7	0	14	0	**21**
Browns	0	6	0	8	**14**

at Huntington Bank Field, Cleveland, Ohio

- Date: October 20
- Game time: 1:00 p.m. EDT
- Game weather: Sunny, 62 °F (17 °C)
- Game attendance: 68,143
- Referee: Ronald Torbert
- TV announcers (CBS): Spero Dedes, Adam Archuleta and Aditi Kinkhabwala
- Recap, Game Book

Game information

**First quarter**

- CIN – Charlie Jones 100-yard kickoff return (Evan McPherson kick), 14:48. Bengals 7–0.

**Second quarter**

- CLE – Nick Chubb 1-yard run (kick failed, wide left), 0:56. Bengals 7–6. **Drive: 12 plays, 78 yards, 4:29.**

**Third quarter**

- CIN – Ja'Marr Chase 18-yard pass from Joe Burrow (Evan McPherson kick), 7:56. Bengals 14–6. **Drive: 5 plays, 65 yards, 2:53.**
- CIN – Tee Higgins 25-yard pass from Joe Burrow (Evan McPherson kick), 1:30. Bengals 21–6. **Drive: 4 plays, 50 yards, 1:55.**

**Fourth quarter**

- CLE – David Njoku 8-yard pass from Jameis Winston (Jameis Winston–Cedric Tillman pass), 1:27. Bengals 21–14. **Drive: 12 plays, 60 yards, 2:16.**

**Top passers**

- CIN – Joe Burrow – 15/25, 181 yards, TD
- CLE – Deshaun Watson – 15/17, 128 yards

**Top rushers**

- CIN – Chase Brown – 15 rushes, 44 yards
- CLE – Dorian Thompson-Robinson – 3 rushes, 44 yards

**Top receivers**

- CIN – Tee Higgins – 4 receptions, 82 yards, TD
- CLE – Cedric Tillman – 8 receptions, 81 yards

With their fifth straight loss, the Browns fell to 1–6. This marked the Browns' first five-game losing streak since 2017. This game also saw the return of starting running back Nick Chubb after he suffered a major knee injury during Week 2 of the 2023 season.

In addition to losing the game, the Browns lost starting quarterback Deshaun Watson for the season late in the 2nd quarter, after he suffered a torn Achilles on a non-contact play. Backup quarterback Jameis Winston was named the starter to replace Watson. It was later announced that head coach Kevin Stefanski would relinquish playcalling duties to offensive coordinator Ken Dorsey moving forward.

==== Week 8: vs. Baltimore Ravens ====
Week 8: Baltimore Ravens at Cleveland Browns – Game summary

Quarter	1	2	3	4	Total
Ravens	0	10	7	7	**24**
**Browns**	3	3	14	9	**29**

at Huntington Bank Field, Cleveland, Ohio

- Date: October 27
- Game time: 1:00 p.m. EDT
- Game weather: Sunny, 52 °F (11 °C)
- Game attendance: 67,431
- Referee: Shawn Smith
- TV announcers (CBS): Tom McCarthy, Jay Feely, Ross Tucker and Amanda Balionis
- Recap, Game Book

Game information

**First quarter**

- CLE – Dustin Hopkins 28-yard field goal, 0:37. Browns 3–0. **Drive: 14 plays, 81 yards, 8:08.**

**Second quarter**

- BAL – Justin Tucker 49-yard field goal, 11:51. Tied 3–3. **Drive: 7 plays, 40 yards, 3:46.**
- CLE – Dustin Hopkins 33-yard field goal, 3:41. Browns 6–3. **Drive: 10 plays, 52 yards, 5:39.**
- BAL – Nelson Agholor 11-yard pass from Lamar Jackson (Justin Tucker kick), 0:27. Ravens 10–6. **Drive: 2 plays, 25 yards, 0:41.**

**Third quarter**

- CLE – David Njoku 23-yard pass from Jameis Winston (Dustin Hopkins kick), 10:46. Browns 13–10. **Drive: 8 plays, 70 yards, 4:14.**
- BAL – Mark Andrews 7-yard pass from Lamar Jackson (Justin Tucker kick), 4:42. Ravens 17–13. **Drive: 6 plays, 62 yards, 2:59.**
- CLE – Cedric Tillman 22-yard pass from Jameis Winston (Dustin Hopkins kick), 2:01. Browns 20–17. **Drive: 6 plays, 72 yards, 2:41.**

**Fourth quarter**

- CLE – Dustin Hopkins 48-yard field goal, 4:55. Browns 23–17. **Drive: 8 plays, 32 yards, 4:11.**
- BAL – Derrick Henry 2-yard run (Justin Tucker kick), 2:36. Ravens 24–23. **Drive: 6 plays, 91 yards, 2:19.**
- CLE – Cedric Tillman 38-yard pass from Jameis Winston (pass failed), 0:59. Browns 29–24. **Drive: 9 plays, 69 yards, 1:37.**

**Top passers**

- BAL – Lamar Jackson – 23/38, 289 yards, 2 TD
- CLE – Jameis Winston – 27/41, 341 yards, 3 TD

**Top rushers**

- BAL – Derrick Henry – 11 rushes, 73 yards, TD
- CLE – Nick Chubb – 16 rushes, 52 yards

**Top receivers**

- BAL – Zay Flowers – 7 receptions, 115 yards
- CLE – Cedric Tillman – 7 receptions, 99 yards, 2 TD

With the win, the Browns improved to 2–6.

Quarterback Jameis Winston was named AFC Offensive Player of the Week. In his first start taking over for the injured Deshaun Watson, Winston completed 27 of 41 passes for 334 yards with three touchdowns, and no interceptions, including leading a game-winning drive in the final minutes.

==== Week 9: vs. Los Angeles Chargers ====
Week 9: Los Angeles Chargers at Cleveland Browns – Game summary

Quarter	1	2	3	4	Total
**Chargers**	7	13	0	7	**27**
Browns	0	3	0	7	**10**

at Huntington Bank Field, Cleveland, Ohio

- Date: November 3
- Game time: 1:00 p.m. EST
- Game weather: Sunny, 57 °F (14 °C)
- Game attendance: 67,431
- Referee: Bill Vinovich
- TV announcers (CBS): Spero Dedes, Adam Archuleta and Aditi Kinkhabwala
- Recap, Game Book

Game information

**First quarter**

- LAC – Joshua Palmer 28-yard pass from Justin Herbert (Cameron Dicker kick), 6:49. Chargers 7–0. **Drive: 6 plays, 30 yards, 3:44.**

**Second quarter**

- CLE – Dustin Hopkins 38-yard field goal, 9:30. Chargers 7–3. **Drive: 10 plays, 34 yards, 5:19.**
- LAC – Quentin Johnston 66-yard pass from Justin Herbert (kick failed, wide left), 8:01. Chargers 13–3. **Drive: 3 plays, 70 yards, 1:29.**
- LAC – J. K. Dobbins 16-yard run (Cameron Dicker kick), 3:30. Chargers 20–3. **Drive: 5 plays, 60 yards, 2:47.**

**Third quarter**

- No scoring plays.

**Fourth quarter**

- LAC – J. K. Dobbins 7-yard run (Cameron Dicker kick), 4:16. Chargers 27–3. **Drive: 4 plays, 46 yards, 2:14.**
- CLE – Cedric Tillman 17-yard pass from Jameis Winston (Dustin Hopkins kick), 0:44. Chargers 27–10. **Drive: 12 plays, 70 yards, 3:32.**

**Top passers**

- LAC – Justin Herbert – 18/27, 282 yards, 2 TD
- CLE – Jameis Winston – 26/46, 235 yards, TD, 3 INT

**Top rushers**

- LAC – J. K. Dobbins – 14 rushes, 85 yards, 2 TD
- CLE – Nick Chubb – 15 rushes, 39 yards

**Top receivers**

- LAC – Quentin Johnston – 4 receptions, 118 yards, TD
- CLE – Cedric Tillman – 6 receptions, 75 yards, TD

With the loss, the Browns entered their bye week at 2–7.

==== Week 11: at New Orleans Saints ====
Week 11: Cleveland Browns at New Orleans Saints – Game summary

Quarter	1	2	3	4	Total
Browns	6	0	8	0	**14**
**Saints**	7	7	0	21	**35**

at Caesars Superdome, New Orleans, Louisiana

- Date: November 17
- Game time: 1:00 p.m. EST/12:00 p.m. CST
- Game weather: None (indoor stadium)
- Game attendance: 70,006
- Referee: Alex Kemp
- TV announcers (Fox): Kenny Albert, Jonathan Vilma and Megan Olivi
- Recap, Game Book

Game information

**First quarter**

- NO – Taysom Hill 10-yard run (Blake Grupe kick), 9:54. Saints 7–0. **Drive: 6 plays, 49 yards, 2:34.**
- CLE – Jerry Jeudy 89-yard pass from Jameis Winston (pass failed), 1:52. Saints 7–6. **Drive: 1 play, 89 yards, 0:15.**

**Second quarter**

- NO – Marquez Valdes-Scantling 71-yard pass from Derek Carr (Blake Grupe kick), 12:40. Saints 14–6. **Drive: 3 plays, 80 yards, 1:34.**

**Third quarter**

- CLE – Elijah Moore 30-yard pass from Jameis Winston (Jameis Winston–David Njoku pass), 8:49. Tied 14–14. **Drive: 8 plays, 92 yards, 4:12.**

**Fourth quarter**

- NO – Taysom Hill 33-yard run (Blake Grupe kick), 13:22. Saints 21–14. **Drive: 9 plays, 77 yards, 4:56.**
- NO – Juwan Johnson 1-yard pass from Derek Carr (Blake Grupe kick), 6:04. Saints 28–14. **Drive: 6 plays, 35 yards, 2:56.**
- NO – Taysom Hill 75-yard run (Blake Grupe kick), 2:26. Saints 35–14. **Drive: 2 plays, 78 yards, 0:17.**

**Top passers**

- CLE – Jameis Winston – 30/46, 395 yards, 2 TD
- NO – Derek Carr – 21/27, 248 yards, 2 TD

**Top rushers**

- CLE – Nick Chubb – 11 rushes, 50 yards
- NO – Taysom Hill – 7 rushes, 138 yards, 3 TD

**Top receivers**

- CLE – Jerry Jeudy – 6 receptions, 142 yards, TD
- NO – Marquez Valdes-Scantling – 2 receptions, 87 yards, TD

With the loss, the Browns fell to 2–8.

==== Week 12: vs. Pittsburgh Steelers ====
Week 12: Pittsburgh Steelers at Cleveland Browns – Game summary

Quarter	1	2	3	4	Total
Steelers	0	3	3	13	**19**
**Browns**	0	10	0	14	**24**

at Huntington Bank Field, Cleveland, Ohio

- Date: November 21
- Game time: 8:15 p.m. EST
- Game weather: Snow, 36 °F (2 °C)
- Game attendance: 67,431
- Referee: Brad Allen
- TV announcers (WPXI, WEWS, Prime Video): Al Michaels, Kirk Herbstreit and Kaylee Hartung
  Game exclusive to WPXI (Pittsburgh) and WEWS (Cleveland) through syndication. Out of market on Prime Video.
- Recap, Game Book

Game information

**First quarter**

- No scoring plays.

**Second quarter**

- PIT – Chris Boswell 48-yard field goal, 10:53. Steelers 3–0. **Drive: 10 plays, 59 yards, 6:08.**
- CLE – Nick Chubb 2-yard run (Dustin Hopkins kick), 4:00. Browns 7–3. **Drive: 12 plays, 80 yards, 6:53.**
- CLE – Dustin Hopkins 34-yard field goal, 0:40. Browns 10–3. **Drive: 6 plays, 15 yards, 2:31.**

**Third quarter**

- PIT – Chris Boswell 28-yard field goal, 1:56. Browns 10–6. **Drive: 13 plays, 71 yards, 7:13.**

**Fourth quarter**

- CLE – Jameis Winston 2-yard run (Jameis Winston-David Njoku pass), 12:16. Browns 18–6. **Drive: 10 plays, 65 yards, 4:40.**
- PIT – Jaylen Warren 3-yard run (Chris Boswell kick), 7:57. Browns 18–13. **Drive: 7 plays, 69 yards, 4:19.**
- PIT – Calvin Austin 23-yard pass from Russell Wilson (pass failed), 6:15. Steelers 19–18. **Drive: 3 plays, 27 yards, 0:50.**
- CLE – Nick Chubb 2-yard run (pass failed), 0:57. Browns 24–19. **Drive: 9 plays, 45 yards, 2:25.**

**Top passers**

- PIT – Russell Wilson – 21/28, 270 yards, TD
- CLE – Jameis Winston – 18/27, 219 yards, INT

**Top rushers**

- PIT – Jaylen Warren – 11 rushes, 45 yards, TD
- CLE – Nick Chubb – 20 rushes, 59 yards, 2 TD

**Top receivers**

- PIT – Calvin Austin – 3 receptions, 78 yards, TD
- CLE – Jerry Jeudy – 6 receptions, 85 yards

With the win, the Browns improved to 3–8. DE Myles Garrett was named AFC Defensive Player of the Week after recording three sacks and a forced fumble. The Browns would not win another game until Week 3 of the following season.

==== Week 13: at Denver Broncos ====
Week 13: Cleveland Browns at Denver Broncos – Game summary

Quarter	1	2	3	4	Total
Browns	7	10	8	7	**32**
**Broncos**	7	14	10	10	**41**

at Empower Field at Mile High, Denver, Colorado

- Date: December 2
- Game time: 8:15 p.m. EST/6:15 p.m. MST
- Game weather: Clear, 48 °F (9 °C)
- Game attendance: 68,306
- Referee: John Hussey
- TV announcers (WOIO, KMGH, ESPN): Joe Buck, Troy Aikman and Lisa Salters
  Game exclusive to WOIO (Cleveland) and KMGH (Denver) through syndication. Out of market on ESPN.
- Recap, Game Book

Game information

**First quarter**

- DEN – Javonte Williams 2-yard run (Wil Lutz kick), 4:13. Broncos 7–0. **Drive: 12 plays, 63 yards, 6:03.**
- CLE – David Njoku 8-yard pass from Jameis Winston (Dustin Hopkins kick), 1:09. Tied 7–7. **Drive: 5 plays, 70 yards, 3:04.**

**Second quarter**

- CLE – Dustin Hopkins 45-yard field goal, 8:49. Browns 10–7. **Drive: 9 plays, 42 yards, 3:43.**
- DEN – Michael Burton 1-yard run (Wil Lutz kick), 4:03. Broncos 14–10. **Drive: 6 plays, 67 yards, 3:04.**
- DEN – Nik Bonitto 71-yard interception return (Wil Lutz kick), 1:38. Broncos 21–10.
- CLE – David Njoku 4-yard pass from Jameis Winston (Dustin Hopkins kick), 0:13. Broncos 21–17. **Drive: 11 plays, 70 yards, 1:25.**

**Third quarter**

- DEN – Marvin Mims 93-yard pass from Bo Nix (Wil Lutz kick), 10:01. Broncos 28–17. **Drive: 3 plays, 92 yards, 0:33.**
- CLE – Jerry Jeudy 70-yard pass from Jameis Winston (Jameis Winston–Jerry Jeudy pass), 9:50. Broncos 28–25. **Drive: 1 play, 70 yards, 0:11.**
- DEN – Wil Lutz 36-yard field goal, 1:52. Broncos 31–25. **Drive: 10 plays, 78 yards, 4:06.**

**Fourth quarter**

- CLE – Nick Chubb 5-yard pass from Jameis Winston (Dustin Hopkins kick), 8:57. Browns 32–31. **Drive: 9 plays, 72 yards, 3:34.**
- DEN – Wil Lutz 27-yard field goal, 2:54. Broncos 34–32. **Drive: 11 plays, 61 yards, 6:03.**
- DEN – Ja'Quan McMillian 46-yard interception return (Wil Lutz kick), 1:48. Broncos 41–32.

**Top passers**

- CLE – Jameis Winston – 34/58, 497 yards, 4 TD, 3 INT
- DEN – Bo Nix – 18/35, 294 yards, TD, 2 INT

**Top rushers**

- CLE – Jerome Ford – 9 rushes, 41 yards
- DEN – Jaleel McLaughlin – 14 rushes, 84 yards

**Top receivers**

- CLE – Jerry Jeudy – 9 receptions, 235 yards, TD
- DEN – Marvin Mims – 3 receptions, 105 yards, TD

With the loss, the Browns fell to 3–9 and were eliminated from contention for the AFC North title. This extended the Browns’ league-high streak of consecutive seasons without a division title to 32.

QB Jameis Winston set a franchise record for most passing yards in a game with 497. The previous record of 457 yards was held by Josh McCown.

==== Week 14: at Pittsburgh Steelers ====
Week 14: Cleveland Browns at Pittsburgh Steelers – Game summary

Quarter	1	2	3	4	Total
Browns	7	0	0	7	**14**
**Steelers**	3	10	14	0	**27**

at Acrisure Stadium, Pittsburgh, Pennsylvania

- Date: December 8
- Game time: 1:00 p.m. EST
- Game weather: Sunny, 49 °F (9 °C)
- Game attendance: 66,845
- Referee: Land Clark
- TV announcers (CBS): Jim Nantz, Tony Romo and Tracy Wolfson
- Recap, Game Book

Game information

**First quarter**

- PIT – Chris Boswell 30-yard field goal, 9:32. Steelers 3–0. **Drive: 5 plays, 24 yards, 2:30.**
- CLE – Jerry Jeudy 35-yard pass from Jameis Winston (Dustin Hopkins kick), 5:50. Browns 7–3. **Drive: 7 plays, 70 yards, 3:42.**

**Second quarter**

- PIT – Najee Harris 1-yard run (Chris Boswell kick), 11:00. Steelers 10–7. **Drive: 5 plays, 31 yards, 2:18.**
- PIT – Chris Boswell 54-yard field goal, 4:21. Steelers 13–7. **Drive: 11 plays, 45 yards, 5:39.**

**Third quarter**

- PIT – Van Jefferson 10-yard pass from Russell Wilson (Chris Boswell kick), 8:37. Steelers 20–7. **Drive: 8 plays, 67 yards, 4:03.**
- PIT – Pat Freiermuth 20-yard pass from Russell Wilson (Chris Boswell kick), 3:51. Steelers 27–7. **Drive: 5 plays, 46 yards, 1:55.**

**Fourth quarter**

- CLE – David Njoku 15-yard pass from Jameis Winston (Dustin Hopkins kick), 7:19. Steelers 27–14. **Drive: 14 plays, 79 yards, 5:47.**

**Top passers**

- CLE – Jameis Winston – 24/41, 212 yards, 2 TD, 2 INT
- PIT – Russell Wilson – 15/26, 158 yards, 2 TD

**Top rushers**

- CLE – Nick Chubb – 11 rushes, 48 yards
- PIT – Najee Harris – 16 rushes, 53 yards, TD

**Top receivers**

- CLE – Jerry Jeudy – 5 receptions, 64 yards, TD
- PIT – Pat Freiermuth – 3 receptions, 48 yards, TD

With the loss, the Browns fell to 3–10 and were eliminated from playoff contention.

==== Week 15: vs. Kansas City Chiefs ====
Week 15: Kansas City Chiefs at Cleveland Browns – Game summary

Quarter	1	2	3	4	Total
**Chiefs**	7	7	7	0	**21**
Browns	0	0	7	0	**7**

at Huntington Bank Field, Cleveland, Ohio

- Date: December 15
- Game time: 1:00 p.m. EST
- Game weather: Cloudy, 40 °F (4 °C)
- Game attendance: 67,983
- Referee: Tra Blake
- TV announcers (CBS): Ian Eagle, Charles Davis and Evan Washburn
- Recap, Game Book

Game information

**First quarter**

- KC – JuJu Smith-Schuster 7-yard pass from Patrick Mahomes (Harrison Butker kick), 12:12. Chiefs 7–0. **Drive: 3 plays, 21 yards, 1:22.**

**Second quarter**

- KC – Noah Gray 6-yard pass from Patrick Mahomes (Harrison Butker kick), 4:46. Chiefs 14–0. **Drive: 14 plays, 87 yards, 6:56.**

**Third quarter**

- KC – Xavier Worthy 21-yard run (Harrison Butker kick), 12:59. Chiefs 21–0. **Drive: 4 plays, 34 yards, 1:47.**
- CLE – Jerome Ford 62-yard run (Riley Patterson kick), 3:16. Chiefs 21–7. **Drive: 2 plays, 49 yards, 0:56.**

**Fourth quarter**

- No scoring plays.

**Top passers**

- KC – Patrick Mahomes – 19/38, 159 yards, 2 TD
- CLE – Jameis Winston – 16/25, 146 yards, 3 INT

**Top rushers**

- KC – Kareem Hunt – 13 rushes, 45 yards
- CLE – Jerome Ford – 7 rushes, 84 yards, TD

**Top receivers**

- KC – Xavier Worthy – 6 receptions, 46 yards
- CLE – Jerry Jeudy – 11 receptions, 108 yards

With the loss, the Browns fell to 3–11.

==== Week 16: at Cincinnati Bengals ====
Week 16: Cleveland Browns at Cincinnati Bengals – Game summary

Quarter	1	2	3	4	Total
Browns	0	0	6	0	**6**
**Bengals**	7	10	0	7	**24**

at Paycor Stadium, Cincinnati, Ohio

- Date: December 22
- Game time: 1:00 p.m. EST
- Game weather: Mostly sunny, 33 °F (1 °C)
- Game attendance: 65,734
- Referee: Brad Rogers
- TV announcers (CBS): Spero Dedes, Adam Archuleta and Aditi Kinkhabwala
- Recap, Game Book

Game information

**First quarter**

- CIN – Tee Higgins 2-yard pass from Joe Burrow (Cade York kick), 7:14. Bengals 7–0. **Drive: 8 plays, 99 yards, 4:58.**

**Second quarter**

- CIN – Andrei Iosivas 6-yard pass from Joe Burrow (Cade York kick), 7:32. Bengals 14–0. **Drive: 9 plays, 50 yards, 4:02.**
- CIN – Cade York 59-yard field goal, 0:00. Bengals 17–0. **Drive: 8 plays, 27 yards, 3:51.**

**Third quarter**

- CLE – Jerome Ford 4-yard run (kick failed, wide right), 5:50. Bengals 17–6. **Drive: 11 plays, 70 yards, 5:20.**

**Fourth quarter**

- CIN – Ja'Marr Chase 32-yard pass from Joe Burrow (Cade York kick), 1:44. Bengals 24–6. **Drive: 2 plays, 36 yards, 0:10.**

**Top passers**

- CLE – Dorian Thompson-Robinson – 20/34, 157 yards, 2 INT
- CIN – Joe Burrow – 23/30, 252 yards, 3 TD

**Top rushers**

- CLE – Jerome Ford – 11 rushes, 92 yards, TD
- CIN – Chase Brown – 18 rushes, 91 yards

**Top receivers**

- CLE – David Njoku – 8 receptions, 66 yards
- CIN – Ja'Marr Chase – 6 receptions, 97 yards, TD

With the loss, the Browns fell to 3–12.

==== Week 17: vs. Miami Dolphins ====
Week 17: Miami Dolphins at Cleveland Browns – Game Summary

Quarter	1	2	3	4	Total
**Dolphins**	3	3	7	7	**20**
Browns	0	3	0	0	**3**

at Huntington Bank Field, Cleveland, Ohio

- Date: December 29
- Game time: 4:05 p.m. EST
- Game weather: Cloudy, 54 °F (12 °C)
- Game attendance: 67,942
- Referee: Ronald Torbert
- TV announcers (CBS): Andrew Catalon, Tiki Barber, Jason McCourty and A.J Ross
- Recap, Game Book

Game information

**First quarter**

- MIA – Jason Sanders 54-yard field goal, 5:46. Dolphins 3–0. **Drive: 7 plays, 26 yards, 3:39.**

**Second quarter**

- CLE – Dustin Hopkins 25-yard field goal, 13:26. Tied 3–3. **Drive: 14 plays, 66 yards, 7:20.**
- MIA – Jason Sanders 39-yard field goal, 0:00. Dolphins 6–3. **Drive: 5 plays, 41 yards, 0:40.**

**Third quarter**

- MIA – Tyler Huntley 13-yard run (Jason Sanders kick), 11:04. Dolphins 13–3. **Drive: 6 plays, 72 yards, 3:05.**

**Fourth quarter**

- MIA – Jonnu Smith 7-yard pass from Tyler Huntley (Jason Sanders kick), 3:38. Dolphins 20–3. **Drive: 4 plays, 21 yards, 0:18.**

**Top passers**

- MIA – Tyler Huntley – 22/26, 225 yards, TD
- CLE – Dorian Thompson-Robinson – 24/47, 170 yards, INT

**Top rushers**

- MIA – Tyler Huntley – 7 rushes, 52 yards, TD
- CLE – D'Onta Foreman – 13 rushes, 49 yards

**Top receivers**

- MIA – Tyreek Hill – 9 receptions, 105 yards
- CLE – Jerry Jeudy – 12 receptions, 94 yards

With the loss, the Browns fell to 3–13. They finished the season 2–6 at home.

==== Week 18: at Baltimore Ravens ====
Week 18: Cleveland Browns at Baltimore Ravens – Game summary

Quarter	1	2	3	4	Total
Browns	0	3	0	7	**10**
**Ravens**	7	7	7	14	**35**

at M&T Bank Stadium, Baltimore, Maryland

- Date: January 4
- Game time: 4:30 p.m. EST
- Game weather: Clear, 31 °F (−1 °C)
- Game attendance: 70,562
- Referee: Scott Novak
- TV announcers (ESPN/ABC/ESPN+): Chris Fowler, Louis Riddick, Dan Orlovsky and Laura Rutledge
- Recap, Game Book

Game information

**First quarter**

- BAL – Nate Wiggins 26-yard interception return for a touchdown (Justin Tucker kick), 8:32. Ravens 7–0.

**Second quarter**

- BAL – Mark Andrews 12-yard pass from Lamar Jackson (Justin Tucker kick), 11:03. Ravens 14–0. **Drive: 7 plays, 47 yards, 3:18.**
- CLE – Dustin Hopkins 23-yard field goal, 6:33. Ravens 14–3. **Drive: 9 plays, 55 yards, 4:30.**

**Third quarter**

- BAL – Rashod Bateman 7-yard pass from Lamar Jackson (Justin Tucker kick), 10:42. Ravens 21–3. **Drive: 7 plays, 70 yards, 4:18.**

**Fourth quarter**

- CLE – Jordan Akins 16-yard pass from Bailey Zappe (Dustin Hopkins kick), 11:33. Ravens 21–10. **Drive: 12 plays, 72 yards, 6:36.**
- BAL – Derrick Henry 2-yard run (Justin Tucker kick), 6:44. Ravens 28–10. **Drive: 8 plays, 70 yards, 4:49.**
- BAL – Derrick Henry 43-yard run (Justin Tucker kick), 3:04. Ravens 35–10. **Drive: 3 plays, 51 yards, 1:31.**

**Top passers**

- CLE – Bailey Zappe – 16/31, 170 yards, TD, 2 INT
- BAL – Lamar Jackson – 16/32, 217 yards, 2 TD

**Top rushers**

- CLE – D'Onta Foreman – 10 rushes, 27 yards
- BAL – Derrick Henry – 20 rushes, 138 yards, 2 TD

**Top receivers**

- CLE – Jerry Jeudy – 6 receptions, 63 yards
- BAL – Rashod Bateman – 5 receptions, 76 yards, TD

With the loss, the Browns finished the season at 3–14, which was tied with the New York Giants and Tennessee Titans for the worst record in the league. This marked the Browns' worst record since their 0–16 season in 2017. The Browns finished the season 1–8 in away games.

=== Standings ===
==== Division ====
AFC North
	W	L	T	PCT	DIV	CONF	PF	PA	STK
^{(3)} Baltimore Ravens	12	5	0	.706	4–2	8–4	518	361	W4
^{(6)} Pittsburgh Steelers	10	7	0	.588	3–3	7–5	380	347	L4
Cincinnati Bengals	9	8	0	.529	3–3	6–6	472	434	W5
Cleveland Browns	3	14	0	.176	2–4	3–9	258	435	L6

==== Conference ====
AFC
Seed	Team	Division	W	L	T	PCT	DIV	CONF	SOS	SOV	STK
**Division leaders**
1	Kansas City Chiefs	West	15	2	0	.882	5–1	10–2	.488	.463	L1
2	Buffalo Bills	East	13	4	0	.765	5–1	9–3	.467	.448	L1
3	Baltimore Ravens	North	12	5	0	.706	4–2	8–4	.529	.525	W4
4	Houston Texans	South	10	7	0	.588	5–1	8–4	.481	.376	W1
**Wild cards**
5	Los Angeles Chargers	West	11	6	0	.647	4–2	8–4	.467	.348	W3
6 (Note: Pittsburgh clinched the #6 seed over Denver based on head-to-head victory.)	Pittsburgh Steelers	North	10	7	0	.588	3–3	7–5	.502	.453	L4
7	Denver Broncos	West	10	7	0	.588	3–3	6–6	.502	.394	W1
**Did not qualify for the postseason**
8	Cincinnati Bengals	North	9	8	0	.529	3–3	6–6	.478	.314	W5
9 (Note: Indianapolis finished ahead of Miami based on head-to-head victory.)	Indianapolis Colts	South	8	9	0	.471	3–3	7–5	.457	.309	W1
10	Miami Dolphins	East	8	9	0	.471	3–3	6–6	.419	.294	L1
11	New York Jets	East	5	12	0	.294	2–4	5–7	.495	.341	W1
12 (Note: Jacksonville finished ahead of New England and Las Vegas based on conference record. (Jacksonville 4–8 to New England 3–9 to Las Vegas 3–9))	Jacksonville Jaguars	South	4	13	0	.235	3–3	4–8	.478	.265	L1
13 (Note: New England finished ahead of Las Vegas based on strength of victory. (New England .471 to Las Vegas .353))	New England Patriots	East	4	13	0	.235	2–4	3–9	.471	.471	W1
14	Las Vegas Raiders	West	4	13	0	.235	0–6	3–9	.540	.353	L1
15 (Note: Cleveland finished ahead of Tennessee based on strength of victory. (Cleveland .510 to Tennessee .431))	Cleveland Browns	North	3	14	0	.176	2–4	3–9	.536	.510	L6
16	Tennessee Titans	South	3	14	0	.176	1–5	3–9	.522	.431	L6
**Tiebreakers** (Note: When breaking ties for three or more teams under the NFL's rules, they are first broken within divisions, then comparing only the highest ranked remaining team from each division.)
