= Eliana Gil =

Family therapist focusing on trauma and abuse

- Born: 24 April 1948 (age 78); New York City, New York
- Education: California Graduate School of Family Psychology, San Rafael
- Known for: Family and child therapy, with a focus on trauma and abuse
- Scientific career
- Workplaces: Gil Institute for Trauma and Recovery; Starbright Training Institute for Child and Family Play Therapy

Eliana Gil (born 24 April 1948), is a lecturer, writer, and clinician of marriage, family and child. She is on the board of a number of professional counselling organizations that use play and art therapies, and she is the former president of the Association for Play Therapy (APT).

Gil is the senior partner of the Gil Institute for Trauma Recovery and Education in Fairfax, Virginia. She is also the director of Starbright Training Institute for Child and Family Play Therapy based in northern Virginia.

== Early life ==
Eliana Gil is originally from Guayaquil, Ecuador. Gil's parents, Manuel and Eugenia, were both born in Ecuador. When Gil was 14 the family moved to Washington, DC. After high school the family moved again to San Francisco.

== Education ==
Gil attended the California Graduate School of Family Psychology in San Rafael where she gained her doctorate in family therapy. She did her Art Therapy training at George Washington University. She went on be a registered Play Therapy Supervisor, a registered Art Therapist, and a licensed Marriage, Family, Child Counselor.

== Early career ==
Gil has worked in the field of child abuse prevention and treatment since 1973. Gil worked as a Marriage, Family and Child Counselor (MFCC) in California and then moved to the East Coast where she became a Licensed Marriage and Family Therapist (LMFT) in Virginia. She went on to work for the San Francisco Child Abuse Council initially as a secretary, then as an Administrative Assistant, an Assistant Director and finally, as a Director of two programs in Contra Costa County: The Costa County Child Abuse Council and Gil and Associates.

Gil then moved first to Maryland and worked with Children's Mental Health, and then moved again to work at the Inova Kellar Center and Childhelp Children's Center in Virginia.

== Later career ==
Gil is the senior partner of the Gil Institute for Trauma Recovery and Education in Fairfax, Virginia which provides therapy, consulting, and training services. Her partner in the private practice is Myriam Goldin.

The Institute includes the Starbright Training Institute for Child and Family Play Therapy, where Gil acts as director, provides training sessions on family play therapy and specialized therapy for youths who have experienced childhood trauma.

She has written widely on the subject of child abuse, family play therapy, culturally informed play therapy, and related topics, and produced a series of educational videotapes in the area of psychotherapy.

Other roles she has held include working as an adjunct faculty member at Virginia Tech’s Family Therapy Department. She has also served on the board of directors of the American Professional Society on the Abuse of Children and the National Resource Center on Child Sexual Abuse. Gil is also a former president of the Association for Play Therapy.

== As media consultant ==
Gil has been consulted by a number of media outlets over the years including the San Francisco Chronicle and KCET.

== Interviews ==
Timothy Dwyer interviewed Gil as part of an article in 2001 for the Journal of Clinical Activities, Assignments & Handouts in Psychotherapy Practice. The article also featured interviews with Richard C. Schwartz and Bill O'Hanlon.

Gil was also interviewed at the end of 2013 by Catherine Ford Sori and Sheryl Schnur for The Family Journal. The interview was printed in two parts, part I in January 2014, and part II in April 2014.

== Personal life ==
Gil was born in New York but grew up in the country of Ecuador, moving to the US in her teens. She is fluent in Spanish.

In 2014 Gil announced that she would be relocating to Florida and make use of technology to reduce her clinical work and travel schedule.

Gil has two children, one of which is professional play and drama therapist. Gil has four grandchildren, many proficient in sports and arts, and her hobbies include playing tennis.

== Bibliography ==
=== Books ===
- Gil, Eliana. The California child abuse reporting law: issues and answers for professionals. State of California: State of California Department for Social Services, Office of Child Abuse Prevention.
- Gil, Eliana (1979). Handbook for understanding and preventing abuse and neglect of children in out-of-home care. San Francisco, California: San Francisco Child Abuse Council.
- Gil, Eliana (1979). Parental stress hotline manual: responding to calls from foster parents and natural parents. San Francisco, California: San Francisco Child Abuse Council/San Francisco Department of Social Services Pilot Project.
- Gil, Eliana (1979). Responding to calls from foster parents and natural parents: a handbook for parental stress hotline volunteers. San Francisco, California: San Francisco Child Abuse Council/San Francisco Department of Social Services Pilot Project.
- Gil, Eliana (1980). A foster parent's guide to working with abused/neglected children. San Francisco Child: San Francisco Child Abuse Council.
- Gil, Eliana (1982). Foster parenting abused children. Chicago, Illinois: National Committee for Prevention of Child Abuse. ISBN 9780937906330.
- Gil, Eliana (1986). I told my secret: a book for kids who were abused. Walnut Creek, California: Launch Press. ISBN 9780961320515.
- Gil, Eliana (1987). Children who molest: a guide for parents of young sex offenders. Walnut Creek, California: Launch Press. ISBN 9780961320553.
- Gil, Eliana; Edwards, Dayan L (1988). Breaking the cycle: assessment and treatment of child abuse and neglect (third ed.). Los Angeles, Calif: Association for Advanced Training in the Behavioral Sciences. ISBN 9789991465388.
- Gil, Eliana (1988). Outgrowing the pain a book for and about adults abused as children (second ed.). New York: Dell Trade Pbk. ISBN 9780307422453.
- Gil, Eliana (1988). Treatment of adult survivors of childhood abuse. Walnut Creek, California: Launch Press. ISBN 9780961320560.
- Gil, Eliana (1990). United we stand: a book for people with multiple personalities. Walnut Creek, California: Launch Press. ISBN 9780961320591.
- Gil, Eliana (1991). The healing power of play: working with abused children. New York: Guilford Press. ISBN 978-0898624670.
- Gil, Eliana; Abounader, Jean; Bass, Ellen; Hamrick, Lynn (1991). Healing sexual abuse: the recovery process. Los Angeles, Calif: KCET Video. ISBN 9780962385032.
- Gil, Eliana; Johnson, Toni Cavanagh (1993). Sexualized children: assessment and treatment of sexualized children and children who molest. Rockville, Maryland: Launch Press. ISBN 9781877872075.
- Gil, Eliana (1994). Play in family therapy. New York: Guilford Press. ISBN 978-0898627572.
- Gil, Eliana; Bodmer-Turner, Jeffrey; Wyrick, Monica; Hamrick, Lynn (1994). Someone in my family has molested children: a book for kids whose dad, mom, or relative has molested children. Rockville, Maryland: Launch Press. ISBN 9781877872099.
- Gil, Eliana (1996). Treating abused adolescents. New York: Guilford Press. ISBN 978-1572301153.
- Gil, Eliana (1996). Systemic treatment of families who abuse. San Francisco: Jossey-Bass Publishers. ISBN 9780787901530.
- Gil, Eliana; Drewes, Athena A. (2005). Cultural issues in play therapy. New York: Guilford Press. ISBN 978-1593853808.
- Gil, Eliana (2006). Helping abused and traumatized children: integrating directive and nondirective approaches. New York: Guilford Press. ISBN 9781593853341.
- Gil, Eliana (2010). Working with children to heal interpersonal trauma: the power of play. New York: Guilford Press. ISBN 9781606238929.
- Gil, Eliana; Shaw, Jennifer A (2011). A book for kids about touching, touching problems, and other stuff. Detroit, Michigan: Self Esteem Shop. ISBN 9780983446606.
- Gil, Eliana (2011). Extended play-based developmental assessment. Detroit, Michigan: Self Esteem Shop. ISBN 9780983446613.
- Gil, Eliana; Shaw, Jennifer A (2013). Working with children with sexual behavior problems. New York: Guilford Publications. ISBN 9780983446606.

=== Chapters in books ===
- Gil, Eliana (2004), "Foreword", in Mather, Cynthia L; Debye, Kristina E (eds.), How long does it hurt?: a guide to recovering from incest and sexual abuse for teenagers, their friends, and their families (second ed.), San Francisco: Jossey-Bass, pp. xv – xvi, ISBN 9780787975692

=== Journal articles ===
- Gil, Eliana; Baxter, Kathleen (1979). "Abuse of children in institutions". Geography Compass. 3 (3–4): 693–698. doi:10.1016/0145-2134(79)90099-1.
- Gil, Eliana (March 1982). "Institutional abuse of children in out-of-home care". Child & Youth Services. 4 (1–2): 7–13. doi:10.1300/J024v04n01_03.
- Gil, Eliana; Bogart, Karen (1982). "An exploratory study of self-esteem and quality of care of 100 children in foster care". Child & Youth Services. 4 (4): 351–363. doi:10.1016/0190-7409(82)90014-7.
- Gil, Eliana (1984). "Foster parents: set up to fail". Child & Youth Services. 8 (1): 121–123. doi:10.1016/0145-2134(84)90059-0. PMID 6539149.
- Gil, Eliana (1993). "Preface". Residential Treatment for Children & Youth. 11 (1): xxi–xxvi. doi:10.1300/J007v11n01_b. PMID 26433278.
- Gil, Eliana; Briere, John (October 1998). "Self-mutilation in clinical and general population samples: prevalence, correlates, and functions". American Journal of Orthopsychiatry. 68 (4): 609–620. doi:10.1037/h0080369. PMID 9809120. S2CID 22831783.
- Gil, Eliana; Briere, John; Johnson, Kerri; Bissada, Angela; Damon, Linda; Crouch, Julie; Hanson, Rochelle; Ernst, Vickie (August 2001). "The Trauma Symptom Checklist for Young Children (TSCYC): reliability and association with abuse exposure in a multi-site study". Child Abuse & Neglect. 25 (8): 1001–1014. doi:10.1016/S0145-2134(01)00253-8. PMID 11601594.
- Gil, Eliana (2011). "Trauma-Focused Integrated Play Therapy (TF-IPT)". In Goodyear-Brown, Paris (ed.). Handbook of Child Sexual Abuse. Hoboken, New Jersey, US: Wiley. pp. 251–278. doi:10.1002/9781118094822.ch11. ISBN 9781118094822.
