= Jowon Briggs =

American football player (born 2001)

No. 91 – New York Jets
- Position: Defensive tackle
- Roster status: Active

Personal information
- Born: September 1, 2001 (age 25); Cincinnati, Ohio, U.S.
- Listed height: 6 ft 1 in (1.85 m)
- Listed weight: 313 lb (142 kg)

Career information
- High school: Walnut Hills (Cincinnati, Ohio)
- College: Virginia (2019–2020); Cincinnati (2021–2023)
- NFL draft: 2024: 7th round, 243rd overall pick

Career history
- Cleveland Browns (2024); New York Jets (2025–present)

Awards and highlights
- First-team All-AAC (2022)

Career NFL statistics as of Week 5, 2026
- Tackles: 67
- Sacks: 6
- Forced fumble: 2
- Fumble recoveries: 1
- Stats at Pro Football Reference

Jowon Briggs (born September 1, 2001) is an American professional football defensive tackle for the New York Jets of the National Football League (NFL). He played college football for the Virginia Cavaliers and Cincinnati Bearcats and was selected by the Browns in the seventh round of the 2024 NFL draft.

== Early life ==
Briggs was born on September 1, 2001, and grew up in Cincinnati, Ohio. He attended Walnut Hills High School alongside aspiring Play-by-Play Broadcaster Alex Perez, and was a standout defensive tackle, being named first-team All-ECC and All-SWO District as a junior and the ECC Defensive Player of the Year, first-team All-State and first-team All-SWO District as a senior. He competed at several all-star games, including the Under Armour All-America Game. Highly recruited, he was ranked as a four-star prospect, the 59th-best player nationally, the fifth-best defensive tackle and the second-best player from Ohio by 247Sports. He committed to play college football for the Virginia Cavaliers over numerous other offers that included the Ohio State Buckeyes and Michigan Wolverines.

Briggs is member of Alpha Phi Alpha fraternity.

== College career ==
Briggs started the first game of his true freshman season at Virginia in 2019, becoming the first freshman on the defensive line to start for the team in the opener since 1986. He ended the season with 19 tackles and a sack and was named a mid-season Freshman All-American. He then appeared in seven games in 2020, after having played in 13 in his first year. He entered the NCAA transfer portal and transferred to the Cincinnati Bearcats in 2021. He ended with 39 tackles, seven tackles-for-loss (TFLs) and four sacks in his two seasons at Virginia.

In his first year at Cincinnati, 2021, Briggs totaled 43 tackles along with four TFLs and three sacks while appearing in all 14 games. The following season, he recorded 60 tackles and 4.5 TFLs and was named a first-team All-American Athletic Conference (AAC) selection. He returned for a final season in 2023 and was a team captain and honorable mention All-AAC choice while recording 27 tackles in 12 starts. He finished his time at Cincinnati with 130 tackles, 14.5 TFLs and eight sacks and earned invites to the Hula Bowl and East–West Shrine Bowl.

== Professional career ==
Pre-draft measurables
Height	Weight	Arm length	Hand span	Wingspan	40-yard dash	10-yard split	20-yard split	20-yard shuttle	Three-cone drill	Vertical jump	Broad jump	Bench press
6 ft 1 1/2 in (1.87 m)	313 lb (142 kg)	32 1/4 in (0.82 m)	9 7/8 in (0.25 m)	6 ft 6 3/4 in (2.00 m)	5.04 s	1.77 s	2.90 s	4.71 s	7.53 s	26.0 in (0.66 m)	8 ft 8 in (2.64 m)	39 reps
All values from Pro Day

=== Cleveland Browns ===
Briggs was selected in the seventh round (243rd overall) of the 2024 NFL draft by the Cleveland Browns. He was waived on August 27, and re-signed to the practice squad. He was promoted to the active roster on December 2.

=== New York Jets ===
On August 20, 2025, Briggs was traded to the New York Jets with a 2026 seventh round pick in exchange for a 2026 sixth round pick.

On March 16, 2026, Briggs re-signed with the Jets.

== NFL career statistics ==
Legend
**Bold**	Career high

=== Regular season ===
Year	Team	Games		Tackles					Interceptions						Fumbles				
Year	Team	GP	GS	Cmb	Solo	Ast	Sck	TFL	Int	Yds	Avg	Lng	TD	PD	FF	Fmb	FR	Yds	TD
2024	CLE	6	0	13	3	10	0.0	1	0	0	0.0	0	0	0	0	0	**1**	0	0
2025	NYJ	17	8	**38**	**19**	**19**	**4.0**	**8**	0	0	0.0	0	0	0	**1**	0	0	0	0
2026	NYJ	5	1	16	5	11	2.0	2	0	0	0.0	0	0	0	**1**	0	0	0	0
Career		28	9	67	27	40	6.0	11	0	0	0.0	0	0	0	2	0	1	0	0

== Personal life ==
Briggs is proficient at varying degrees of competency with twelve musical instruments which are the recorder, piano, violin, viola, cello, double bass, bass guitar, acoustic guitar, electric guitar, saxophone, flute and harmonica.

During his days at the University of Virginia, he sang with its chamber choir, the University Singers and an a cappella group called The Hullabahoos. He also performed The Star-Spangled Banner before a few basketball games at both Virginia and the University of Cincinnati. His singing voice is a tenor.
