= The Family Journal =

- Discipline: Psychology
- Language: English
- Edited by: Stephen Southern

Publication details
- History: 1993-present
- Publisher: SAGE Publications
- Frequency: Quarterly

Standard abbreviations
- ISO 4: Fam. J.

Indexing
- ISSN: 1066-4807 (print); 1552-3950 (web)
- LCCN: 93648899
- OCLC no.: 222889822

Links
- Journal homepage; Online access; Online archive

The Family Journal is a peer-reviewed academic journal that publishes papers four times a year in the field of Psychology. The journal's editor is Stephen Southern (Mississippi College). It has been in publication since 1993 and is currently published by SAGE Publications.

== Scope ==
The Family Journal aims to advance the theory, research and practice of counseling with couples and families from a family systems perspective. The journal publishes articles which address current issues, innovative methods and professional concerns. The Family Journal also contains case studies, interviews and literature reviews.

== Abstracting and Indexing ==
The Family Journal is abstracted and indexed in the following databases:

- Clarivate Analytics: Emerging Sources Citation Index (ESCI)
- Collectanea Personal Edition
- Corporate ResourceNET - Ebsco
- Current Citations Express
- EBSCO: Family Studies Abstracts
- Family & Society Studies Worldwide (NISC)
- MAS FullTEXT
- MasterFILE - Ebsco
- NISC
- PsycINFO
- PsycLIT
- Psychological Abstracts
- SafetyLit
- Scopus
- Social Services Abstracts
- Sociological Abstracts
- Standard Periodical Directory (SPD)
- TOPICsearch - Ebsco
