= Diarmaid of Armagh =

Bishop of Armagh (d. 852)

Diarmaid of Armagh (died c. 852) was Abbot and bishop of Armagh.

== Life ==
In the medieval Irish church, the abbot of Armagh also served as bishop. In 834, Diarmait was named Bishop to succeed Eógan Mainistrech mac Ainbthig.

He was driven from his see by the usurper Foraunan in 835. However, he claimed his rights and collected his cess in Connacht, in 836. He brought with him the Bachal Isu (the reputed staff of Jesus), the Book of Armagh, and St. Patrick's Bell. The first two were considered important symbols of the office and authority of the Bishop of Armagh. With the support of Fedelmid mac Crimthainn, Diarmaid was installed at Armagh in 839, though the see continued to be contested.

During his bishopric, the Scandinavian rovers under Turgesius seized Armagh in 841 and leveled the churches.

By 848 Diarmaid was in sole control. In 851 he attended the meeting between Máel Sechnaill mac Máele Ruanaid and Matudán mac Muiredaig where Máel Sechnaill was acknowledged as High King by the men of Ulster.

The Annals of Ulster describe him as one of "the wisest of the doctors of Europe". He is also known as Saint Dermot, and his feast is celebrated on 24 April.
