= Jerry Jeudy =

American football player (born 1999)

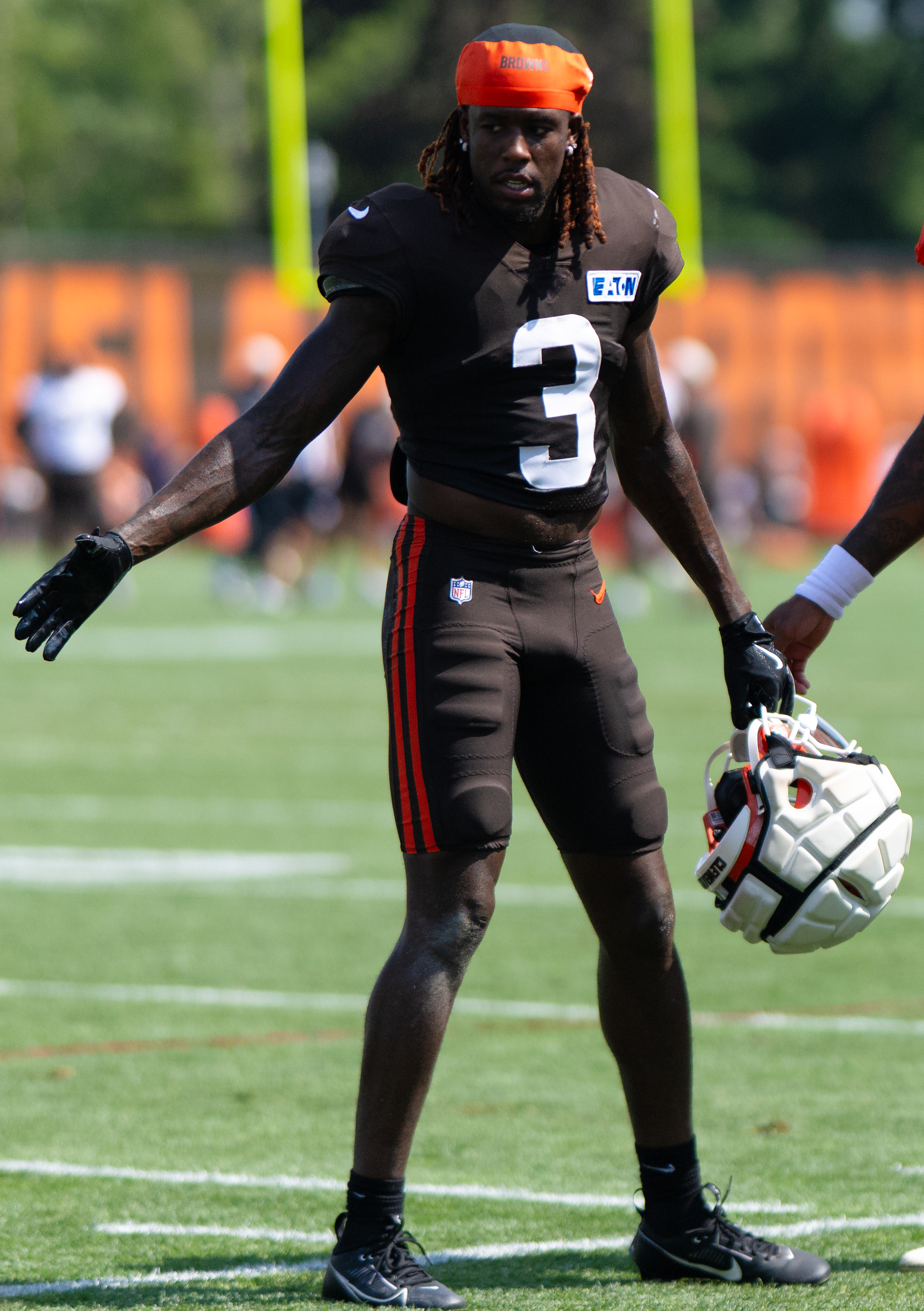
- Jeudy with the Cleveland Browns in 2026

No. 3 – Cleveland Browns
- Position: Wide receiver
- Roster status: Active

Personal information
- Born: April 24, 1999 (age 27); Deerfield Beach, Florida, U.S.
- Listed height: 6 ft 1 in (1.85 m)
- Listed weight: 195 lb (88 kg)

Career information
- High school: Deerfield Beach
- College: Alabama (2017–2019)
- NFL draft: 2020: 1st round, 15th overall pick

Career history
- Denver Broncos (2020–2023); Cleveland Browns (2024–present)

Awards and highlights
- Pro Bowl (2024); CFP national champion (2017); Fred Biletnikoff Award (2018); Consensus All-American (2018); First-team All-American (2019); 2× First-team All-SEC (2018, 2019)

Career NFL statistics as of Week 9, 2026
- Receptions: 369
- Receiving yards: 5,092
- Receiving touchdowns: 17
- Stats at Pro Football Reference

Jerry Davarus Jeudy (born April 24, 1999) is an American professional football wide receiver for the Cleveland Browns of the National Football League (NFL). He played college football for the Alabama Crimson Tide, where he was awarded the Fred Biletnikoff Award as the season's outstanding college football receiver as a sophomore in 2018, and was selected by the Denver Broncos with the 15th overall pick of the 2020 NFL draft.

== Early life ==
Jeudy attended Deerfield Beach High School in Deerfield Beach, Florida, where he played high school football. As a high school senior in 2016, he had 76 receptions for 1,054 yards and 15 touchdowns. Jeudy was rated as a five-star recruit, the third-highest-rated wide receiver in the country and 21st-highest-rated recruit overall by the 247Sports Composite. He committed to the University of Alabama to play college football on July 28, 2016.

== College career ==
=== Freshman year: 2017 ===
Jeudy enrolled early at Alabama and participated in spring practice for the 2017 season. He was named the MVP of Alabama's A-Day spring game after catching five passes for 134 yards and two touchdowns. Jeudy caught his first career pass in Alabama's second game of the season against Fresno State. In total, Jeudy amassed 14 receptions for 264 yards and two touchdowns during his true freshman season.

=== Sophomore year: 2018 ===
During the spring before his sophomore season in 2018, Jeudy underwent surgery for a meniscus injury which led him to miss part of spring practice. He fully recovered in time for fall camp, saying "I feel great, actually. I forgot I got injured to be real." Jeudy was named third-team preseason All-SEC at SEC Media Days.

Jeudy caught six touchdown passes in Alabama's first three games of the 2018 season, including a 136-yard, two-touchdown performance against Ole Miss. He had 135 yards and two touchdowns against Arkansas on October 6, and the next week set a career high with 147 yards and a touchdown against Missouri. He had 139 yards and a touchdown in Alabama's loss to Clemson in the 2019 College Football Playoff National Championship.

Jeudy was named a consensus first-team All-American and first-team All-SEC. He was awarded the Fred Biletnikoff Award as the nation's best wide receiver. His 14 receiving touchdowns led the conference and was tied for third nationally, and his 1,315 receiving yards were second in the conference behind Ole Miss's A. J. Brown.

=== Junior year: 2019 ===
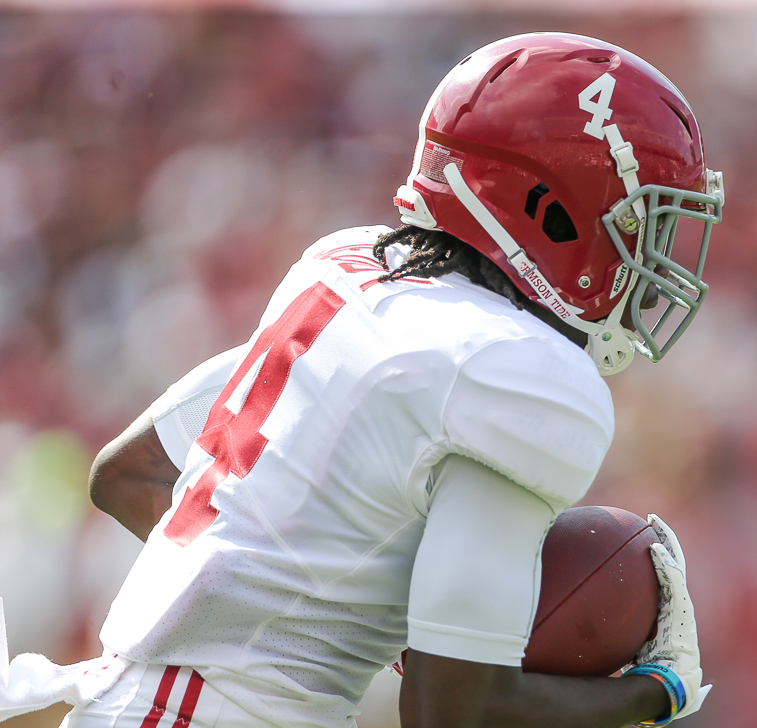
Jeudy with Alabama in 2019

Jeudy was a unanimous pre-season All-American heading into his junior year, and a favorite to repeat as the Biletnikoff Award winner. Numerous publications named him among the best returning players in the country, and he was listed on several Heisman Trophy watchlists.

Jeudy was the Crimson Tide's leading receiver in each of their first two games, finishing with 137 yards and a touchdown in the season opener against Duke, and 103 yards and three touchdowns against New Mexico State the following week. Jeudy eclipsed 100 yards in only two more games during the regular season, in part due to the season-ending injury of quarterback Tua Tagovailoa. He finished the regular season with 959 yards receiving and 9 touchdowns and was again named first-team All-SEC. He capped off his junior season with six receptions for 204 yards and a touchdown in the Crimson Tide's win over Michigan in the Citrus Bowl. In January 2020, Jeudy announced he would forgo his senior season by entering the 2020 NFL draft.

=== College statistics ===
Season	Team	GP	Receiving				
Season	Team	GP	Rec	Yds	Avg	Lng	TD
2017	Alabama	14	14	264	18.9	36	2
2018	Alabama	15	68	1,315	19.3	81	14
2019	Alabama	13	77	1,163	15.1	85	10
Career		42	159	2,742	17.2	85	26

== Professional career ==
Pre-draft measurables
Height	Weight	Arm length	Hand span	Wingspan	40-yard dash	10-yard split	20-yard split	20-yard shuttle	Vertical jump	Broad jump	Wonderlic
6 ft 1 in (1.85 m)	193 lb (88 kg)	32 1/8 in (0.82 m)	9 1/2 in (0.24 m)	6 ft 4 in (1.93 m)	4.45 s	1.48 s	2.59 s	4.53 s	35.0 in (0.89 m)	10 ft 0 in (3.05 m)	9
All values from NFL Combine

=== Denver Broncos ===
==== 2020 season ====
Jeudy was selected by the Denver Broncos with the 15th pick in the first round of the 2020 NFL draft. He was the second wide receiver selected, behind Henry Ruggs (Las Vegas Raiders, 12th overall). On July 23, 2020, Jeudy signed a four-year, $15.192 million contract with the team, with an $8.6 million signing bonus.

On September 14, Jeudy made his NFL debut in the season opener against the Tennessee Titans, recording four receptions for 56 yards in the 14–16 loss. In Week 4 against the New York Jets on Thursday Night Football, Jeudy recorded his first professional touchdown reception a 48-yard on a pass from Brett Rypien. In Week 9 against the Atlanta Falcons, he had his first 100-yard game with seven receptions for 125 receiving yards during the 34–27 loss. In Week 16, Jeudy was credited with five drops, in addition to six catches for 61 yards, in a 16–19 loss to the Los Angeles Chargers. Jeudy finished the 2020 season with 9 total drops according to NBC Sports, tied for second most in the league with fellow rookie CeeDee Lamb, though PFF credits Jeudy with 12 drops on the season. His 44% catch rate was one of the lowest in the league among qualified receivers in 2020, ranking exactly 200th.

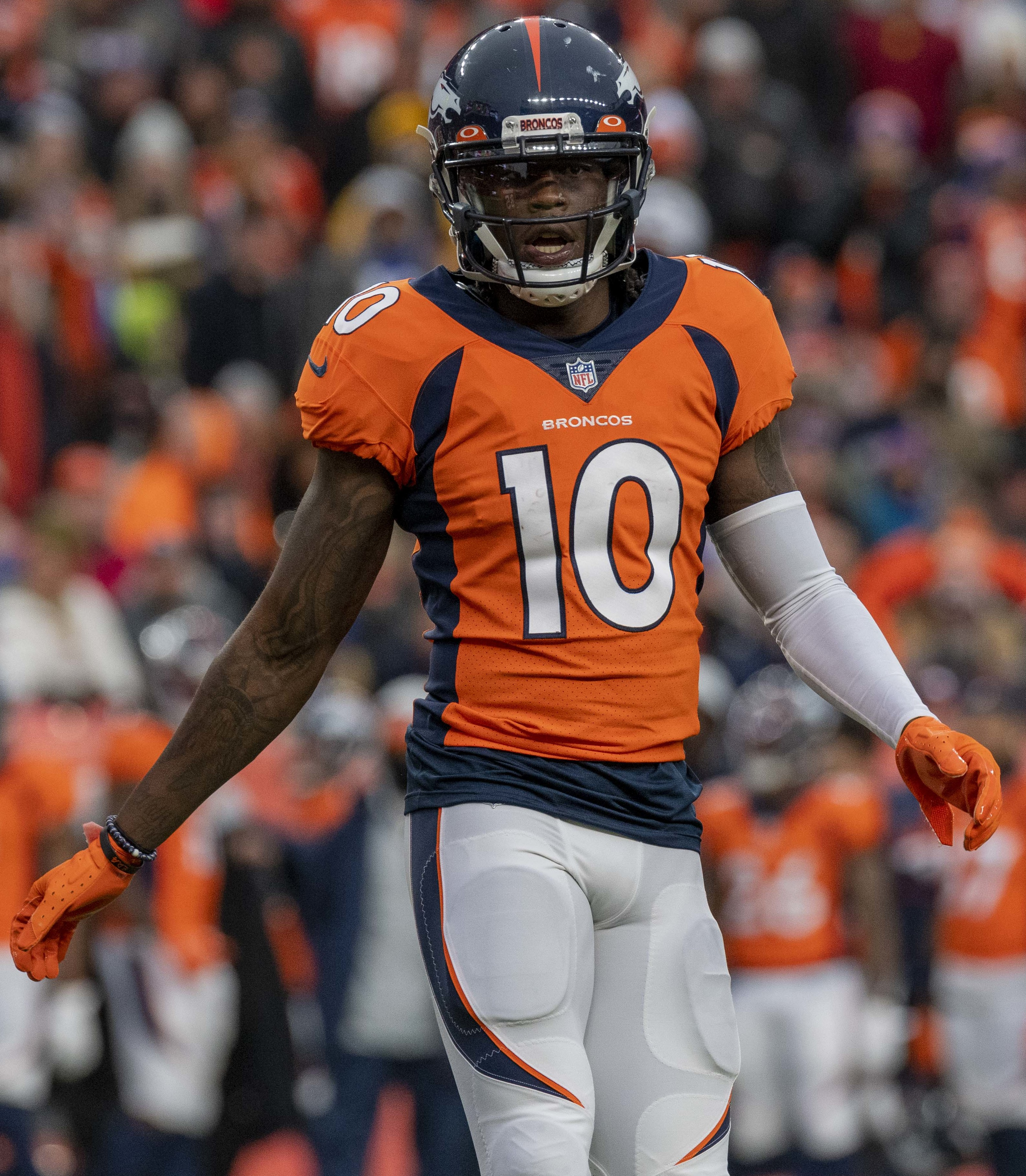
Jeudy with the Denver Broncos in 2021

==== 2021 season ====
In Week 1 against the New York Giants, Jeudy suffered a high ankle sprain that caused him to leave the game. He was placed on injured reserve on September 14, 2021. He was activated on October 30. Jeudy finished the 2021 season with 38 receptions for 467 yards and zero touchdowns. His 67.9% catch rate ranked 91st among qualified receivers.

==== 2022 season ====
Jeudy had his best statistical season to date in 2022, in terms of yards, receptions, and touchdowns, despite sustaining an injury against the Titans in Week 10. He returned December 4. In Week 14 against the Kansas City Chiefs, Jeudy had three receiving touchdowns in the 34–28 loss. On December 16, Jeudy was fined $36,281 for unsportsmanlike conduct against the Chiefs where he removed his helmet and made illegal contact with an official. In Week 17, Jeudy had a career-high 154 yards on five catches in a 31–28 win over the Chargers, earning AFC Offensive Player of the Week. Although his drops were down from previous seasons, Jeudy finished the season with a catch rate of 67%, which was 101st in the league among qualified receivers. In the 2022 season, Jeudy had 67 receptions for 972 receiving yards and six receiving touchdowns.

==== 2023 season ====
On May 1, 2023, the Broncos picked up the fifth-year option of Jeudy's contract. Jeudy injured his hamstring in practice before the opening of the 2023 season which caused him to miss the Week 1 game. Before the Week 6 game, there was a heated moment between Jeudy and Steve Smith Sr., an analyst for NFL Network, after Smith attempted to apologize to Jeudy for criticisms he made about Jeudy's ability as a wide receiver on his podcast. Jeudy swore at Smith and rejected Smith's overtures; afterwards, Smith criticized Jeudy on live television, calling Jeudy a JAG ("just a guy") and a "tier 3" wide receiver that no team should trade for. The rant went viral. The Broncos would lose that game against the Chiefs with Jeudy having 14 receiving yards on three catches. When asked by the media to address the rumors regarding the Broncos attempting to trade him, his response was, "It don't affect me at all because at the end of the day, I'm still going to be the player I am. I know what I can do and I know what I'm capable of. So, trade me or (don't) trade me. It don't matter because at the end of the day I'm going to still be me."

Jeudy finished the season with 758 yards and 2 touchdowns in 16 games played. His 62.1% catch rate was the lowest since his rookie year. His catch rate was just 142nd among qualified receivers.

=== Cleveland Browns ===
==== 2024 season ====
On March 13, 2024, the Broncos traded Jeudy to the Cleveland Browns for 2024 fifth and sixth-round picks. On March 19, Jeudy signed a three-year, $58 million contract extension with the Browns, with $41 million guaranteed.

On September 8, Jeudy scored a touchdown in his Browns debut against the Cowboys. He had his first 100-yard receiving game of the season in Week 11 against the Saints, catching six passes for 142 yards, highlighted by an 89-yard touchdown reception in the first quarter. In a Week 13 loss against the Broncos, Jeudy delivered a career-best performance against his former team, recording 235 yards and a touchdown on nine catches. His performance topped a 16-year record held by Terrell Owens for the most receiving yards gained by a player facing their former team.

Jeudy finished the season with a career high 90 catches for 1,229 yards and scored four touchdowns. According to Pro Football Reference, he led the league in drops with 13, the most in his career, and was in the top 20 in drop percentage at 9%, which was the second highest rate of his career to date.

==== 2025 season ====
In 2025, Jeudy finished the season with 602 receiving yards and 2 touchdowns, recording the second most drops in the league at 10, and catching just 47.2% of his targets, which ranked 217th in the league among qualified receivers.

== NFL career statistics ==
Legend
	Led the league
**Bold**	Career high

Year	Team	Games		Receiving					Rushing					Fumbles	
Year	Team	GP	GS	Rec	Yds	Avg	Lng	TD	Att	Yds	Avg	Lng	TD	Fum	Lost
2020	DEN	16	14	52	856	**16.5**	**92T**	3	0	0	0.0	0	0	**2**	0
2021	DEN	10	5	38	467	12.3	40	0	2	3	1.5	3	0	1	0
2022	DEN	15	14	67	972	14.5	67	**6**	**4**	**40**	**10.0**	**14**	0	0	0
2023	DEN	16	11	54	758	14.0	47	2	0	0	0.0	0	0	1	0
2024	CLE	17	16	**90**	**1,229**	13.7	89	4	0	0	0.0	0	0	0	0
2025	CLE	17	16	50	602	12.0	60	2	1	5	5.0	5	0	1	1
2026	CLE	8	2	18	208	11.5	33	0	0	0	0.0	0	0	0	0
Career		99	78	369	5092	13.8	92T	17	7	48	6.9	14	0	5	1

=== Highlights ===
==== Cleveland Browns franchise records ====
• Most single season receptions (90)

== Personal life ==
While Jeudy was a senior in high school in 2016, his seven-year-old sister Aaliyah died.

Jeudy is of Haitian descent.

Jeudy wears a Jewish Star of David necklace, even though he is not Jewish. He bought the necklace because he has been nicknamed "Jew", based on the first syllable of his surname.

== Legal troubles ==
On May 12, 2022, Jeudy was arrested in Arapahoe County, Colorado and charged with second-degree criminal tampering with a domestic violence enhancer, a misdemeanor. The arrest stemmed from an alleged non-violent incident with his girlfriend, who has since asked that the charges be dropped.
