= Witold Smorawiński =

Polish musician

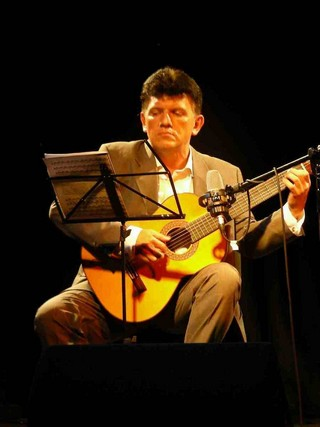
Witold Smorawiński

Witold Smorawiński (born April 24, 1964 in Głogów) is a Polish classical guitarist, composer and teacher. He comes from a family of musicians and therefore he had a chance to perform in public since his childhood.

== Career ==
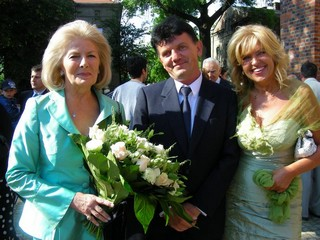

Witold Smorawiński has been invited to numerous concerts recitals organized by the Poznań Musical Association, Warsaw Musical Association, Mazowieckie Cultural Centre, Institution of Cultural Promotion Silesia in Katowice, SPAM in Wrocław and Warsaw. He had the pleasure playing as a soloist with the group Warsaw Soloists "Concerto Avenna" conducted by Andrzej Mysiński. He also participated in festivals of Winners of Musical Competitions in Wrocław, Warsaw, Poznań and Katowice. His musical oeuvre consists of numerous solo guitar compositions in which he uses various elements of musical movements of the 20th century.

== Competition ==
He is winner of the IInd prize (the Ist prize was not awarded) of the International Classical Guitar Competition in Paris (1997). The competition was organized by U.F.A.M Association of French Artists Musicians.

== Music of Głogów ==
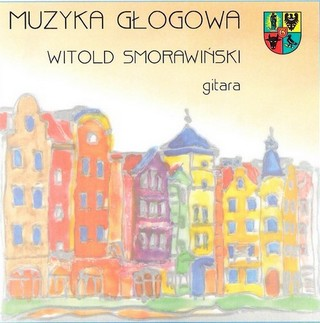

He has recorded CD devoted his city. Each work describes important persons or antique related with Głogów.
