= Leroy Watson (American football) =

American football player (born 1998)

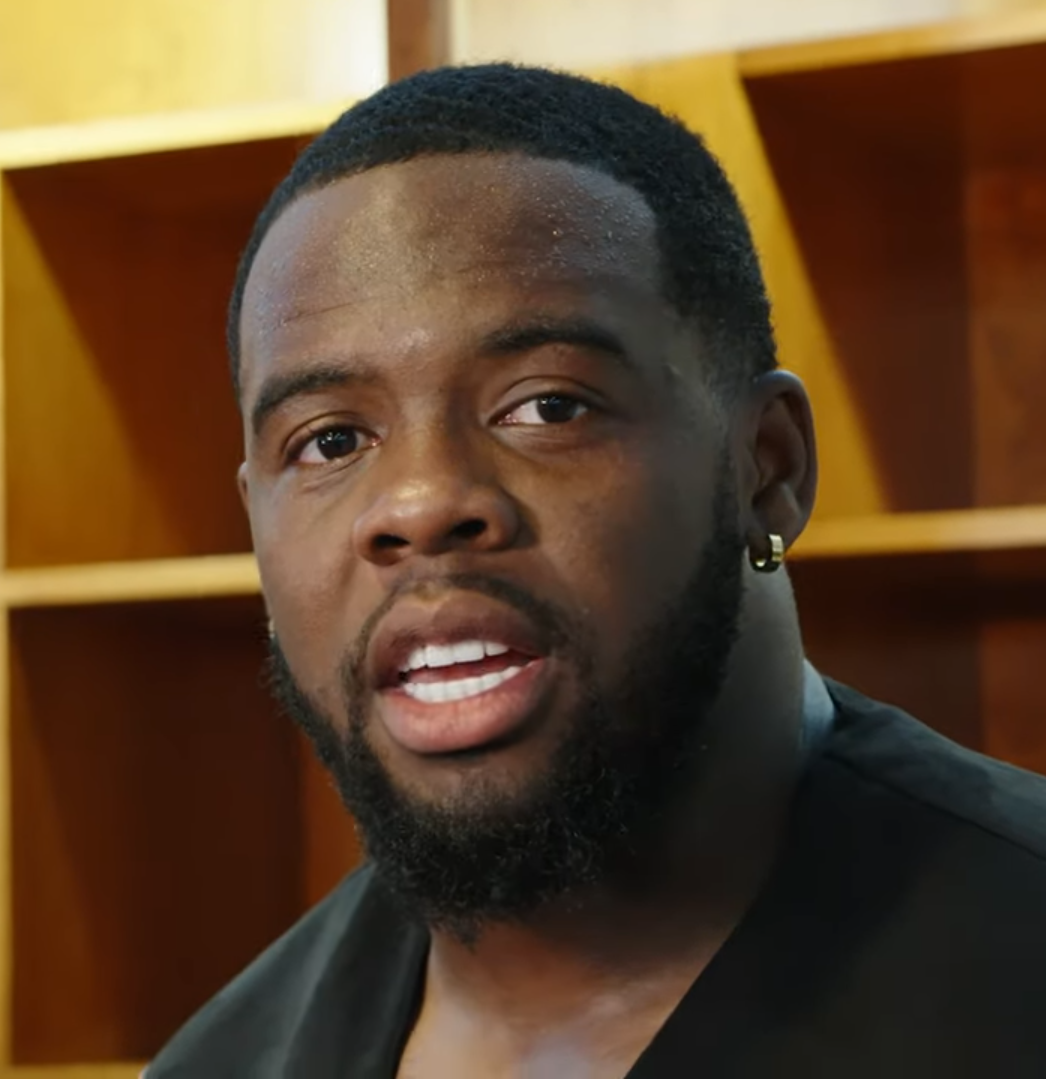
- Watson in 2024

Profile
- Position: Offensive tackle

Personal information
- Born: June 10, 1998 (age 28); Snellville, Georgia, U.S.
- Listed height: 6 ft 4 in (1.93 m)
- Listed weight: 311 lb (141 kg)

Career information
- High school: Shiloh (Snellville)
- College: Hutchinson CC (2017–2018) UTSA (2019–2021)
- NFL draft: 2022: undrafted

Career history
- Atlanta Falcons (2022)*; San Francisco 49ers (2022–2023)*; Cleveland Browns (2023); Tennessee Titans (2024); Minnesota Vikings (2024)*; Las Vegas Raiders (2025)*; Louisville Kings (2026)
- * Offseason or practice squad member only

Career NFL statistics as of 2024
- Games played: 11
- Games started: 4
- Stats at Pro Football Reference

Leroy Watson IV (born June 10, 1998) is an American professional football offensive tackle. He played college football for the UTSA Roadrunners.

== College career ==
=== Hutchinson CC ===
In Watson's career with Hutchinson he caught 12 passes for 123 yards and two touchdowns. Watson transferred to UTSA after the 2018 season to play Division I football.

=== UTSA ===
In the 2020 season, Watson was named an honorable mention all-Conference USA member. In Watson's three-year career with the Roadrunners he recorded 25 receptions for 297 yards and two touchdowns.

== Professional career ==
Pre-draft measurables
Height	Weight	Arm length	Hand span	40-yard dash	10-yard split	20-yard split	20-yard shuttle	Three-cone drill	Vertical jump	Bench press
6 ft 4 5/8 in (1.95 m)	270 lb (122 kg)	35 in (0.89 m)	10 3/8 in (0.26 m)	4.91 s	1.68 s	2.82 s	4.75 s	7.46 s	33.5 in (0.85 m)	18 reps
All values from Pro Day

=== Atlanta Falcons ===
After not being selected in the 2022 NFL draft, Watson signed with the Atlanta Falcons as an undrafted free agent. While Watson was a blocking tight end at UTSA, he caught the eye of Falcons offensive line coach Dwayne Ledford during the Falcons local pre-draft day. After signing with the Falcons as an undrafted free agent, he was converted to Left Tackle. During the offseason, he bulked up, adding more than 30 pounds and going from 270 to over 300 pounds for the transition. However, on August 30, 2022, Watson was waived.

=== San Francisco 49ers ===
On September 5, 2022, Watson was signed by the San Francisco 49ers to their practice squad. On February 1, 2023, Watson signed a futures deal with the 49ers.

On August 29, 2023, Watson was waived by the 49ers during final roster cuts and was re-signed to the practice squad the following day.

=== Cleveland Browns ===
On November 2, 2023, Watson was signed by the Cleveland Browns off the 49ers practice squad. Watson played seven games at right and left tackle for the Browns during the 2023 season.

=== Tennessee Titans ===
On April 12, 2024, Watson was traded to the Tennessee Titans for a seventh-round selection (227th overall) of the 2024 NFL draft. He was waived on August 27, and re-signed to the practice squad. On October 9, Watson was signed to the active roster. Watson started four games as the Titans' right tackle during the 2024 season, but missed play later in the year due to a back injury. He was released again on December 10.

=== Minnesota Vikings ===
On December 27, 2024, Watson signed with the Minnesota Vikings practice squad. He signed a reserve/future contract with Minnesota on January 16, 2025.

On August 25, 2025, Watson was waived by the Vikings.

=== Las Vegas Raiders ===
On October 1, 2025, Watson signed with the Las Vegas Raiders' practice squad. He was released on November 18.

=== Louisville Kings ===
On January 14, 2026, Watson was selected by the Louisville Kings of the United Football League (UFL). He was released on April 19.
