= Charles Jordan (magician) =

Charles Thorton Jordan (1 October 1888 – 24 April 1944) was an American magician.

== Early life ==
Charles Jordan was born in Berkeley, California to Charles Renalt Jordan, a wholesale supply manager and chicken farmer, and Mary Louise (Thornton) Jordan; he had a younger sister, Margaret Louise (1891-1959). When he was 10 years old, he saw Harry Kellar perform, which inspired him to develop his own card tricks.

== Career ==
He moved to Penngrove, and self-published Thirty Card Mysteries in 1919. In it, he described "The Jordan Count", and "The Gray Code", two methods of false counting. In 1920, he self-published the five-part Ten New Prepared Card Tricks series, with contributions from Thomas Nelson Downs.

A few years later, he quit practicing magic and focused on manufacturing radios.

In 1935, he was contacted by Theodore Annemann, who wanted to publish a collection of his work. However, the series was abandoned. Many of Jordan’s tricks were later collected and published by Karl Fulves.

Jordan never performed in public, he was only famous because of his publications. He died in Vallejo after a long illness.
