= 2024 Jacksonville Jaguars season =

30th season in franchise history

- Jaguars 30th season logo
- Owner: Shahid Khan
- General manager: Trent Baalke
- Head coach: Doug Pederson
- Offensive coordinator: Press Taylor
- Defensive coordinator: Ryan Nielsen
- Home stadium: EverBank Stadium

Results
- Record: 4–13
- Division place: 3rd AFC South
- Playoffs: Did not qualify
- All-Pros: P Logan Cooke (2nd team); LS Ross Matiscik (2nd team)
- Pro Bowlers: P Logan Cooke; LS Ross Matiscik; WR Brian Thomas Jr.

Uniform
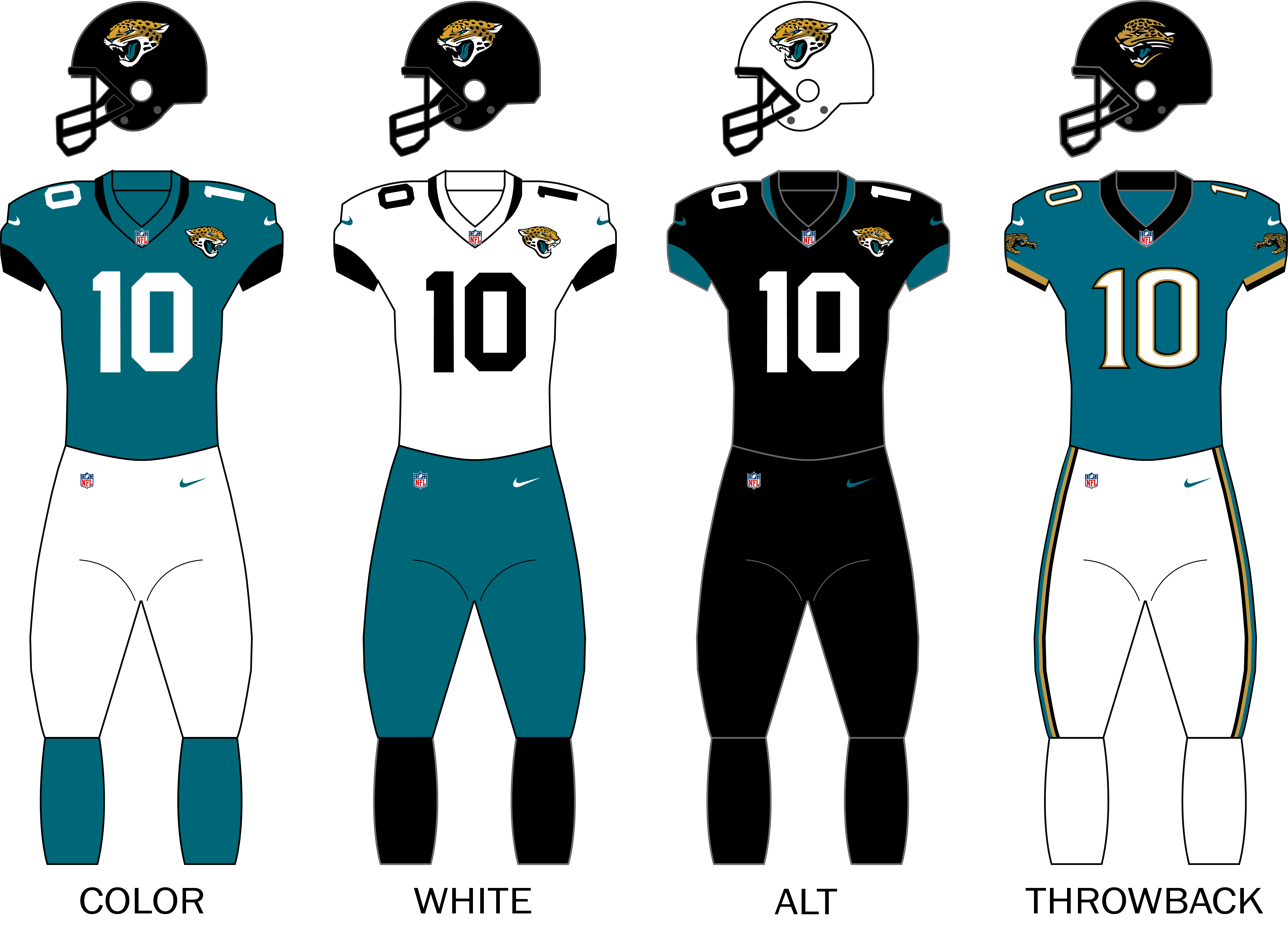

The 2024 season was the Jacksonville Jaguars' 30th in the National Football League (NFL), their fourth and final full season under the leadership of general manager Trent Baalke and their third and final under head coach Doug Pederson. The Jaguars failed to improve on their 9–8 record from the previous two seasons after a Week 10 loss to the Minnesota Vikings dropped them to 2–8, and a loss to the Detroit Lions the following week made the Jaguars the first team to secure a losing record in 2024, suffering their first losing season since 2021. The Jaguars were eliminated from playoff contention after the Denver Broncos defeated the Cleveland Browns in Week 13.

On January 6, 2025, the Jaguars fired head coach Doug Pederson who finished his tenure in Jacksonville with a 22–29 record. Weeks later, on January 22, 2025, general manager Trent Baalke was also fired. Baalke had a 25–43 record with the team.

As of the 2026 season, this would be the most recent losing season for the Jaguars and also the last season that they would miss the playoffs.

== Offseason ==
=== New signings ===
Position	Player	Former team	Contract
DE	Arik Armstead	San Francisco 49ers	3 years, $43.5 million
CB	Ronald Darby	Baltimore Ravens	2 years, $8.5 million
WR	Gabe Davis	Buffalo Bills	3 years, $39 million
TE	Josiah Deguara	Green Bay Packers	1 year, $1.29 million
WR	Devin Duvernay	Baltimore Ravens	2 years, $8.5 million
S	Terrell Edmunds	Tennessee Titans	1 year, $1.25 million
CB	Tre Flowers	Atlanta Falcons	1 year, $1.25 million
DE	Trevis Gipson	Tennessee Titans	1 year, $1.292 million
C	Mitch Morse	Buffalo Bills	2 years, $10.5 million
TE	Patrick Murtagh	(Int.)	1 year, $750 thousand
S	Darnell Savage	Green Bay Packers	3 years, $21.75 million
K	Joey Slye	Washington Commanders	1 year, $1.29 million
LB	Ty Summers	New Orleans Saints	1 year, $1.25 million

=== Trade acquisitions ===
Position	Player	Previous team	Trade details
QB	Mac Jones	New England Patriots	New England received: 2024 sixth-round selection (193rd); Jacksonville received: QB Mac Jones

=== Re-signed/extended ===
Position	Player	Contract
OLB	Josh Hines-Allen	5 years, $141.25 million
CB	Tyson Campbell	4 years, $76.5 million
OG	Ezra Cleveland	3 years, $24 million
LB	Caleb Johnson	1 year, $1.35 million
RB	D'Ernest Johnson	1 year, $1.27 million
QB	Trevor Lawrence	5 years, $275 million
DT	Jeremiah Ledbetter	1 year, $1.85 million
LB	Foyesade Oluokun	3 years, $30 million
OG	Tyler Shatley	1 year, $1.37 million
S	Daniel Thomas	2 years, $4 million

=== Reserve/futures contracts ===
Position	Player
OG	Chandler Brewer
CB	Tevaughn Campbell
OLB	DJ Coleman
OLB	De'Shaan Dixon
S	Erick Hallett
LB	Dequan Jackson
CB	Amani Oruwariye
DE	Esezi Otomewo
S	Ayo Oyelola
K	Riley Patterson
TE	Josh Pederson
C	Keaton Sutherland
C	Darryl Williams
WR	Seth Williams

=== NFL draft ===
2024 Jacksonville Jaguars draft selections
Round	Pick	Player	Position	College	Notes
1	17	Traded to the Minnesota Vikings (Note: The Jaguars traded a first-round selection (17th overall) to the Minnesota Vikings in exchange for first- and fifth-round selections (23rd and 167th overall), and 2025 third- and fourth-round selections.)			
1	23	Brian Thomas Jr.	WR	LSU	From Vikings
2	48	Maason Smith	DT	LSU	
3	79	Traded to the Atlanta Falcons (Note: The Jaguars traded a conditional fourth-round selection and a conditional 2023 sixth-round selection to the Atlanta Falcons in exchange for WR Calvin Ridley. The 2023 pick became a fifth-rounder once Ridley was reinstated on March 6, 2023. The 2024 pick became a third-rounder after Ridley reached a playing time incentive.)			
3	96	Jarrian Jones	CB	FSU	Compensatory pick
4	114	Javon Foster	OT	Missouri	
4	116	Jordan Jefferson	DT	LSU	From Saints (Note: The Jaguars traded a 2023 fourth-round selection (127th overall) to the New Orleans Saints in exchange for a fourth-round selection (116th overall) and a 2023 seventh-round selection (227th overall).)
5	153	Deantre Prince	CB	Mississippi	
5	167	Keilan Robinson	RB	Texas	From Vikings
6	177	Traded to the Minnesota Vikings (Note: The Jaguars traded a sixth-round selection (177th overall) to the Minnesota Vikings in exchange for G Ezra Cleveland.)			From Panthers (Note: The Jaguars traded WR Laviska Shenault to the Carolina Panthers in exchange for a sixth-round selection (177th overall) and a 2023 seventh-round selection (226th overall).)
6	193	Traded to the New England Patriots (Note: The Jaguars traded a sixth-round selection (193rd overall) to the New England Patriots in exchange for QB Mac Jones.)			
6	212	Cam Little	K	Arkansas	Compensatory pick
7	236	Myles Cole	DE	Texas Tech	

2024 Jacksonville Jaguars undrafted free agents
Name	Position	College	Ref.
Shawn Bowman	TE	Rutgers	
Andre Carter	DE	Indiana	
Joshua Cephus	WR	UTSA	
Brevin Easton	WR	Albany	
Jalen Jackson	RB	Villanova	
Steven Jones	OL	Oregon	
Trey Kiser	LB	South Alabama	
Lorenzo Lingard	RB	Akron	
Andrew Parker Jr.	LB	Appalachian State	
Josh Proctor	S	Ohio State	
Wayne Ruby	WR	Mount Union	
Joseph Scates	WR	Memphis	
David White Jr.	WR	Western Carolina	

Draft trades

== Staff ==
2024 Jacksonville Jaguars staff
Front office: Owner – Shahid Khan; President – Mark Lamping; General manager – Trent Baalke; Assistant general manager – Ethan Waugh; Director of college scouting – Michael Davis; Assistant director of college scouting – John Stevenson; Director of player personnel – Regis Eller; Director of pro personnel – DeJuan Polk; Director of player finance – Trip MacCracken; Chief football strategy officer – Tony Khan; Director of football analytics – Ryan Paganetti; Head coaches: Head coach – Doug Pederson; Offensive coaches: Offensive coordinator – Press Taylor; Quarterbacks – Mike McCoy; Assistant quarterbacks – Andrew Breiner; Running backs – Vacant; Wide receivers – Chad Hall; Assistant wide receivers – Tyler Tettleton; Tight ends – Richard Angulo; Offensive line – Phil Rauscher; Assistant offensive line – Greg Austin; Offensive quality control – Jamel Mutunga; Offensive quality control – Nick Williams	Defensive coaches: Defensive coordinator – Ryan Nielsen; Defensive line – Jeremy Garrett; Assistant defensive line – Rory Segrest; Outside linebackers – Bill Shuey; Assistant outside linebackers – Mario Jeberaeel; Inside linebackers – Matt House; Defensive backs – Kris Richard; Assistant secondary coach/defensive analyst – Mike Gray; Defensive assistant/cornerbacks – Cory Robinson; Defensive quality control – Patrick Reilly; Special teams coaches: Special teams coordinator – Heath Farwell; Assistant special teams coordinator – Luke Thompson; Strength and conditioning: Head strength and conditioning coach – Cedric Scott; Assistant strength and conditioning coach – Adam Potts; Assistant strength and conditioning coach – Brandon Ireland; Assistant strength and conditioning coach – Kevin Maxen

== Final roster ==
2024 Jacksonville Jaguars roster
Quarterbacks (QB): 19 C. J. Beathard; 10 Mac Jones; Running backs (RB): 4 Tank Bigsby; 1 Travis Etienne; 25 D'Ernest Johnson; 31 Keilan Robinson; Wide receivers (WR): 12 Devin Duvernay; 15 Tim Jones; 87 Josh Reynolds; 7 Brian Thomas Jr.; 11 Parker Washington; Tight ends (TE): 81 Josiah Deguara; 89 Luke Farrell; 85 Brenton Strange	Offensive linemen (OL): 76 Ezra Cleveland G; 79 Luke Fortner C; 62 Javon Foster T; 73 Blake Hance G; 77 Anton Harrison T; 72 Walker Little T; 65 Mitch Morse C; 68 Brandon Scherff G; 70 Cole Van Lanen T; Defensive linemen (DL): 91 Arik Armstead DE; 59 Myles Cole DE; 52 DaVon Hamilton DT; 41 Josh Hines-Allen DE; 98 Jordan Jefferson DT; 93 Tyler Lacy DT; 98 Jeremiah Ledbetter DT; 92 Esezi Otomewo DT; 94 Maason Smith DT; 44 Travon Walker DE	Linebackers (LB): 56 Yasir Abdullah OLB; 43 Joe Giles-Harris OLB; 57 Caleb Johnson OLB; 33 Devin Lloyd OLB; 51 Ventrell Miller OLB/MLB; 48 Chad Muma OLB; 23 Foyesade Oluokun MLB; Defensive backs (DB): 30 Montaric Brown CB; 3 Tyson Campbell CB; 5 Andre Cisco FS; 25 Ronald Darby CB; 26 Antonio Johnson FS/SS; 22 Jarrian Jones CB; 24 Deantre Prince CB; 6 Darnell Savage SS; 20 Daniel Thomas SS; 42 Andrew Wingard FS/SS; Special teams (ST): 9 Logan Cooke P; 39 Cam Little K; 46 Ross Matiscik LS	Practice squad: 49 Shawn Bowman TE; 21 Christian Braswell CB; 61 Jerome Carvin G; 80 Joshua Cephus WR; 14 Elijah Cooks WR; 78 Dennis Daley T; 53 Kalen DeLoach OLB; 60 Dieter Eiselen G; 38 Myles Gaskin RB; 97 Joe Gaziano DE; 35 Matthew Jackson SS; 64 Steven Jones G; 34 Zech McPhearson CB; 84 Louis Rees-Zammit WR (IPP); 69 Tyler Shatley C/G; 86 Austin Trammell WR; 18 John Wolford QB; Reserve: 0 Gabe Davis WR (IR); 47 De'Shaan Dixon DE (IR); 17 Evan Engram TE (IR); 75 Cooper Hodges G (IR); 13 Christian Kirk WR (IR); 16 Trevor Lawrence QB (IR); 88 Patrick Murtagh TE (IPP) (IR); 83 David White Jr. WR (IR); Rookies in italics 53 active, 8 reserve, 16 practice squad (1 exempt)

== Preseason ==
Week	Date	Opponent	Result	Record	Venue	Recap
1	August 10	Kansas City Chiefs	W 26–13	1–0	EverBank Stadium	Recap
2	August 17	Tampa Bay Buccaneers	W 20–7	2–0	EverBank Stadium	Recap
3	August 23	at Atlanta Falcons	W 31–0	3–0	Mercedes-Benz Stadium	Recap

== Regular season ==
=== Schedule ===
Week	Date	Opponent	Result	Record	Venue	Recap
1	September 8	at Miami Dolphins	**L** 17–20	0–1	Hard Rock Stadium	Recap
2	September 15	Cleveland Browns	**L** 13–18	0–2	EverBank Stadium	Recap
3	September 23	at Buffalo Bills	**L** 10–47	0–3	Highmark Stadium	Recap
4	September 29	at **Houston Texans**	**L** 20–24	0–4	NRG Stadium	Recap
5	October 6	**Indianapolis Colts**	**W** 37–34	1–4	EverBank Stadium	Recap
6	October 13	at Chicago Bears	**L** 16–35	1–5	(United Kingdom) Tottenham Hotspur Stadium (London)	Recap
7	October 20	New England Patriots	**W** 32–16	2–5	(United Kingdom) Wembley Stadium (London)	Recap
8	October 27	Green Bay Packers	**L** 27–30	2–6	EverBank Stadium	Recap
9	November 3	at Philadelphia Eagles	**L** 23–28	2–7	Lincoln Financial Field	Recap
10	November 10	Minnesota Vikings	**L** 7–12	2–8	EverBank Stadium	Recap
11	November 17	at Detroit Lions	**L** 6–52	2–9	Ford Field	Recap
12	Bye					
13	December 1	**Houston Texans**	**L** 20–23	2–10	EverBank Stadium	Recap
14	December 8	at **Tennessee Titans**	**W** 10–6	3–10	Nissan Stadium	Recap
15	December 15	New York Jets	**L** 25–32	3–11	EverBank Stadium	Recap
16	December 22	at Las Vegas Raiders	**L** 14–19	3–12	Allegiant Stadium	Recap
17	December 29	**Tennessee Titans**	**W** 20–13	4–12	EverBank Stadium	Recap
18	January 5	at **Indianapolis Colts**	**L** 23–26 (OT)	4–13	Lucas Oil Stadium	Recap

Note: Intra-division opponents are in bold text.

=== Game summaries ===
==== Week 1: at Miami Dolphins ====
Week One: Jacksonville Jaguars at Miami Dolphins – Game summary

Quarter	1	2	3	4	Total
Jaguars	7	10	0	0	**17**
**Dolphins**	0	7	7	6	**20**

at Hard Rock Stadium, Miami Gardens, Florida

- Date: September 8
- Game time: 1:00 p.m. EDT
- Game weather: Partly cloudy, 91 °F (33 °C)
- Game attendance: 65,582
- Referee: Craig Wrolstad
- TV announcers (CBS): Kevin Harlan, Trent Green and Melanie Collins
- Recap, Game Book

Game information

**First quarter**

- JAX – Travis Etienne 1-yard run (Cam Little kick), 4:31. Jaguars 7–0. **Drive: 6 plays, 96 yards, 3:18.**

**Second quarter**

- JAX – Brian Thomas Jr. 14-yard pass from Trevor Lawrence (Cam Little kick), 6:21. Jaguars 14–0. **Drive: 8 plays, 55 yards, 5:31.**
- MIA – De'Von Achane 1-yard run (Jason Sanders kick), 1:04. Jaguars 14–7. **Drive: 12 plays, 70 yards, 5:17.**
- JAX – Cam Little 53-yard field goal, 0:00. Jaguars 17–7. **Drive: 6 plays, 43 yards, 1:04.**

**Third quarter**

- MIA – Tyreek Hill 80-yard pass from Tua Tagovailoa (Jason Sanders kick), 2:08. Jaguars 17–14. **Drive: 1 play, 80 yards, 0:11.**

**Fourth quarter**

- MIA – Jason Sanders 37-yard field goal, 4:22. Tied 17–17. **Drive: 12 plays, 73 yards, 6:44.**
- MIA – Jason Sanders 52-yard field goal, 0:00. Dolphins 20–17. **Drive: 8 plays, 31 yards, 2:09.**

**Top passers**

- JAX – Trevor Lawrence – 12/21, 162 yards, TD
- MIA – Tua Tagovailoa – 23/37, 338 yards, TD

**Top rushers**

- JAX – Tank Bigsby – 12 rushes, 73 yards
- MIA – Jeff Wilson – 5 rushes, 26 yards

**Top receivers**

- JAX – Gabe Davis – 3 receptions, 62 yards
- MIA – Tyreek Hill – 7 receptions, 130 yards, TD

==== Week 2: vs. Cleveland Browns ====
Week Two: Cleveland Browns at Jacksonville Jaguars – Game summary

Quarter	1	2	3	4	Total
**Browns**	7	6	3	2	**18**
Jaguars	0	3	7	3	**13**

at EverBank Stadium, Jacksonville, Florida

- Date: September 15
- Game time: 1:00 p.m. EDT
- Game weather: Cloudy, 80 °F (27 °C)
- Game attendance: 60,105
- Referee: Adrian Hill
- TV announcers (CBS): Chris Lewis, Jason McCourty and Amanda Guerra
- Recap, Game Book

Game information

**First quarter**

- CLE – Deshaun Watson 1-yard run (Dustin Hopkins kick), 2:29. Browns 7–0. **Drive: 16 plays, 89 yards, 9:14.**

**Second quarter**

- CLE – Dustin Hopkins 53-yard field goal, 9:52. Browns 10–0. **Drive: 12 plays, 41 yards, 6:35.**
- JAX – Cam Little 22-yard field goal, 4:44. Browns 10–3. **Drive: 11 plays, 66 yards, 5:08.**
- CLE – Dustin Hopkins 38-yard field goal, 0:27. Browns 13–3. **Drive: 8 plays, 52 yards, 4:17.**

**Third quarter**

- CLE – Dustin Hopkins 44-yard field goal, 10:20. Browns 16–3. **Drive: 6 plays, 23 yards, 2:16.**
- JAX – Travis Etienne 4-yard run (Cam Little kick), 1:11. Browns 16–10. **Drive: 3 plays, 72 yards, 1:18.**

**Fourth quarter**

- JAX – Cam Little 25-yard field goal, 7:32. Browns 16–13. **Drive: 13 plays, 83 yards, 6:42.**
- CLE – Trevor Lawrence sacked in the end zone for safety, 1:44. Browns 18–13.

**Top passers**

- CLE – Deshaun Watson – 22/34, 186 yards
- JAX – Trevor Lawrence – 14/30, 220 yards

**Top rushers**

- CLE – Jerome Ford – 7 rushes, 64 yards
- JAX – Travis Etienne – 13 rushes, 52 yards, TD

**Top receivers**

- CLE – Jerry Jeudy – 5 receptions, 73 yards
- JAX – Brian Thomas Jr. – 2 receptions, 94 yards

==== Week 3: at Buffalo Bills ====
Week Three: Jacksonville Jaguars at Buffalo Bills – Game summary

Quarter	1	2	3	4	Total
Jaguars	0	3	7	0	**10**
**Bills**	13	21	3	10	**47**

at Highmark Stadium, Orchard Park, New York

- Date: September 23
- Game time: 7:30 p.m. EDT
- Game weather: Cloudy, 68 °F (20 °C)
- Game attendance: 70,316
- Referee: Shawn Smith
- TV announcers (WJAX/ESPN): Chris Fowler, Louis Riddick, Dan Orlovsky and Laura Rutledge
- Recap, Game Book

Game information

**First quarter**

- BUF – James Cook 6-yard run (kick blocked), 9:34. Bills 6–0. **Drive: 10 plays, 70 yards, 5:26.**
- BUF – Dalton Kincaid 6-yard pass from Josh Allen (Tyler Bass kick), 3:25. Bills 13–0. **Drive: 11 plays, 65 yards, 5:12.**

**Second quarter**

- JAX – Cam Little 41-yard field goal, 10:39. Bills 13–3. **Drive: 14 plays, 47 yards, 7:46.**
- BUF – Keon Coleman 24-yard pass from Josh Allen (Tyler Bass kick), 6:19. Bills 20–3. **Drive: 8 plays, 68 yards, 4:20.**
- BUF – Khalil Shakir 27-yard pass from Josh Allen (Tyler Bass kick), 2:04. Bills 27–3. **Drive: 5 plays, 41 yards, 2:09.**
- BUF – Ty Johnson 16-yard pass from Josh Allen (Tyler Bass kick), 0:19. Bills 34–3. **Drive: 5 plays, 64 yards, 0:53.**

**Third quarter**

- JAX – Brenton Strange 6-yard pass from Trevor Lawrence (Cam Little kick), 11:15. Bills 34–10. **Drive: 8 plays, 70 yards, 3:45.**
- BUF – Tyler Bass 27-yard field goal, 5:03. Bills 37–10. **Drive: 11 plays, 61 yards, 6:12.**

**Fourth quarter**

- BUF – Tyler Bass 43-yard field goal, 7:45. Bills 40–10. **Drive: 4 plays, 7 yards, 2:13.**
- BUF – Ray Davis 3-yard run (Tyler Bass kick), Bills 47–10. **Drive: 4 plays, 21 yards, 2:17.**

**Top passers**

- JAX – Trevor Lawrence – 21/38, 178 yards, TD, INT
- BUF – Josh Allen – 23/30, 263 yards, 4 TD

**Top rushers**

- JAX – Travis Etienne – 11 rushes, 68 yards
- BUF – Josh Allen – 6 rushes, 44 yards

**Top receivers**

- JAX – Christian Kirk – 8 receptions, 79 yards
- BUF – Khalil Shakir – 6 receptions, 72 yards

==== Week 4: at Houston Texans ====
Week Four: Jacksonville Jaguars at Houston Texans – Game summary

Quarter	1	2	3	4	Total
Jaguars	10	3	7	0	**20**
**Texans**	7	10	0	7	**24**

at NRG Stadium, Houston, Texas

- Date: September 29
- Game time: 1:00 p.m. EDT/12:00 p.m. CDT
- Game weather: None (retractable roof closed)
- Game attendance: 71,115
- Referee: Tra Blake
- TV announcers (CBS): Andrew Catalon, Tiki Barber, Jason McCourty and A.J. Ross
- Recap, Game Book

Game information

**First quarter**

- JAX – Brian Thomas Jr. 2-yard pass from Trevor Lawrence (Cam Little kick), 12:44. Jaguars 7–0. **Drive: 1 play, 2 yards, 0:04.**
- HOU – Stefon Diggs 6-yard run (Kaʻimi Fairbairn kick), 7:23. Tied 7–7. **Drive: 9 plays, 70 yards, 5:21.**
- JAX – Cam Little 41-yard field goal, 2:41. Jaguars 10–7. **Drive: 9 plays, 54 yards, 4:42.**

**Second quarter**

- HOU – Nico Collins 3-yard pass from C. J. Stroud (Kaʻimi Fairbairn kick), 7:19. Texans 14–10. **Drive: 12 plays, 74 yards, 7:27.**
- JAX – Cam Little 52-yard field goal, 3:49. Texans 14–13. **Drive: 7 plays, 39 yards, 3:30.**
- HOU – Kaʻimi Fairbairn 30-yard field goal, 0:03. Texans 17–13. **Drive: 11 plays, 59 yards, 3:46.**

**Third quarter**

- JAX – Christian Kirk 8-yard pass from Trevor Lawrence (Cam Little kick), 6:16. Jaguars 20–17. **Drive: 7 plays, 74 yards, 4:00.**

**Fourth quarter**

- HOU – Dare Ogunbowale 1-yard pass from C. J. Stroud (Kaʻimi Fairbairn kick), 0:18. Texans 24–20. **Drive: 9 plays, 69 yards, 2:36.**

**Top passers**

- JAX – Trevor Lawrence – 18/33, 169 yards, 2 TD
- HOU – C. J. Stroud – 27/40, 345 yards, 2 TD

**Top rushers**

- JAX – Tank Bigsby – 7 rushes, 90 yards
- HOU – Cam Akers – 13 rushes, 53 yards

**Top receivers**

- JAX – Brian Thomas Jr. – 6 receptions, 86 yards, TD
- HOU – Nico Collins – 12 receptions, 151 yards, TD

==== Week 5: vs. Indianapolis Colts ====
Week Five: Indianapolis Colts at Jacksonville Jaguars – Game summary

Quarter	1	2	3	4	Total
Colts	7	3	0	24	**34**
**Jaguars**	0	13	7	17	**37**

at EverBank Stadium, Jacksonville, Florida

- Date: October 6
- Game time: 1:00 p.m. EDT
- Game weather: Rain, 74 °F (23 °C)
- Game attendance: 60,214
- Referee: Carl Cheffers
- TV announcers (CBS): Spero Dedes, Adam Archuleta, and Aditi Kinkhabwala
- Recap, Game Book

Game information

**First quarter**

- IND – Michael Pittman Jr. 1-yard pass from Joe Flacco (Matt Gay kick), 8:49. Colts 7–0. **Drive: 12 plays, 71 yards, 6:11.**

**Second quarter**

- JAX – Cam Little 23-yard field goal, 8:57. Colts 7–3. **Drive: 14 plays, 84 yards, 7:46.**
- JAX – Brian Thomas Jr. 85-yard pass from Trevor Lawrence (Cam Little kick), 7:02. Jaguars 10–7. **Drive: 1 play, 85 yards, 0:10.**
- IND – Matt Gay 30-yard field goal, 1:44. Tied 10–10. **Drive: 12 plays, 58 yards, 5:18.**
- JAX – Cam Little 30-yard field goal, 0:04. Jaguars 13–10. **Drive: 1 play, 0 yards, 0:02.**

**Third quarter**

- JAX – Tank Bigsby 19-yard run (Cam Little kick), 7:13. Jaguars 20–10. **Drive: 1 play, 19 yards, 0:08.**

**Fourth quarter**

- IND – Mo Alie-Cox 18-yard pass from Joe Flacco (Matt Gay kick), 14:54. Jaguars 20–17. **Drive: 15 plays, 70 yards, 7:19.**
- JAX – Brenton Strange 4-yard pass from Trevor Lawrence (Cam Little kick), 9:59. Jaguars 27–17. **Drive: 7 plays, 70 yards, 4:55.**
- IND – Matt Gay 37-yard field goal, 6:00. Jaguars 27–20. **Drive: 8 plays, 51 yards, 3:59.**
- JAX – Tank Bigsby 65-yard run (Cam Little kick), 5:09. Jaguars 34–20. **Drive: 2 plays, 70 yards, 0:51.**
- IND – Trey Sermon 1-yard run (Matt Gay kick), 4:27. Jaguars 34–27. **Drive: 3 plays, 70 yards, 0:42.**
- IND – Alec Pierce 65-yard pass from Joe Flacco (Matt Gay kick), 2:40. Tied 34–34. **Drive: 2 plays, 77 yards, 0:45.**
- JAX – Cam Little 49-yard field goal, 0:17. Jaguars 37–34. **Drive: 8 plays, 39 yards, 2:23.**

**Top passers**

- IND – Joe Flacco – 33/44, 359 yards, 3 TD
- JAX – Trevor Lawrence – 28/34, 371 yards, 2 TD, INT

**Top rushers**

- IND – Trey Sermon – 10 rushes, 38 yards, TD
- JAX – Tank Bigsby – 13 rushes, 101 yards, 2 TD

**Top receivers**

- IND – Alec Pierce – 3 receptions, 134 yards, TD
- JAX – Brian Thomas Jr. – 5 receptions, 122 yards, TD

==== Week 6: at Chicago Bears ====
NFL London games

Week Six: Jacksonville Jaguars at Chicago Bears – Game summary

Quarter	1	2	3	4	Total
Jaguars	3	0	7	6	**16**
**Bears**	0	14	7	14	**35**

at Tottenham Hotspur Stadium, London, England

- Date: October 13
- Game time: 2:30 p.m. BST/9:30 a.m. EDT
- Game weather: Partly cloudy, 54 °F (12 °C)
- Game attendance: 61,182
- Referee: Brad Allen
- TV announcers (WJXX/NFLN): Rich Eisen, Kurt Warner, Stacey Dales and Steve Wyche
- Recap, Game Book

Game information

**First quarter**

- JAX – Cam Little 30-yard field goal, 4:37. Jaguars 3–0. **Drive: 14 plays, 67 yards, 8:12.**

**Second quarter**

- CHI – Cole Kmet 31-yard pass from Caleb Williams (Cairo Santos kick), 11:07. Bears 7–3. **Drive: 7 plays, 81 yards, 3:46.**
- CHI – Cole Kmet 2-yard pass from Caleb Williams (Cairo Santos kick), 0:13. Bears 14–3. **Drive: 10 plays, 85 yards, 2:55.**

**Third quarter**

- CHI – Keenan Allen 9-yard pass from Caleb Williams (Cairo Santos kick), 11:22. Bears 21–3. **Drive: 7 plays, 41 yards, 3:18.**
- JAX – Gabe Davis 21-yard pass from Trevor Lawrence (Cam Little kick), 6:02. Bears 21–10. **Drive: 11 plays, 70 yards, 5:20.**

**Fourth quarter**

- CHI – Keenan Allen 3-yard pass from Caleb Williams (Cairo Santos kick), 14:56. Bears 28–10. **Drive: 10 plays, 70 yards, 6:06.**
- CHI – D'Andre Swift 1-yard run (Cairo Santos kick), 12:29. Bears 35–10. **Drive: 3 plays, 36 yards, 1:06.**
- JAX – Gabe Davis 5-yard pass from Trevor Lawrence (pass failed), 6:58. Bears 35–16. **Drive: 17 plays, 70 yards, 5:31.**

**Top passers**

- JAX – Trevor Lawrence – 23/35, 234 yards, 2 TD, INT
- CHI – Caleb Williams – 23/29, 226 yards, 4 TD, INT

**Top rushers**

- JAX – D'Ernest Johnson – 6 rushes, 28 yards
- CHI – D'Andre Swift – 17 rushes, 91 yards, TD

**Top receivers**

- JAX – Evan Engram – 10 receptions, 102 yards
- CHI – Cole Kmet – 5 receptions, 70 yards, 2 TD

==== Week 7: vs. New England Patriots ====
NFL London games

Week Seven: New England Patriots at Jacksonville Jaguars – Game summary

Quarter	1	2	3	4	Total
Patriots	7	3	0	6	**16**
**Jaguars**	0	22	3	7	**32**

at Wembley Stadium, London, England

- Date: October 20
- Game time: 2:30 p.m. BST/9:30 a.m. EDT
- Game weather: Cloudy, 63 °F (17 °C)
- Game attendance: 86,651
- Referee: Brad Rogers
- TV announcers (WJXX/NFLN): Chris Rose, Joe Thomas and Steve Wyche
- Recap, Game Book

Game information

**First quarter**

- NE – JaMycal Hasty 16-yard pass from Drake Maye (Joey Slye kick), 8:32. Patriots 7–0. **Drive: 11 plays, 68 yards, 6:28.**

**Second quarter**

- NE – Joey Slye 41-yard field goal, 13:31. Patriots 10–0. **Drive: 12 plays, 63 yards, 6:31.**
- JAX – Brian Thomas Jr. 6-yard pass from Trevor Lawrence (Cam Little kick), 9:21. Patriots 10–7. **Drive: 8 plays, 68 yards, 4:10.**
- JAX – Tank Bigsby 1-yard run (Cam Little kick), 3:32. Jaguars 14–10. **Drive: 6 plays, 82 yards, 3:37.**
- JAX – Parker Washington 96-yard punt return (Trevor Lawrence–Brian Thomas Jr. pass), 1:34. Jaguars 22–10.

**Third quarter**

- JAX – Cam Little 21-yard field goal, 9:42. Jaguars 25–10. **Drive: 12 plays, 67 yards, 5:18.**

**Fourth quarter**

- NE – K. J. Osborn 22-yard pass from Drake Maye (pass failed), 8:22. Jaguars 25–16. **Drive: 9 plays, 94 yards, 2:48.**
- JAX – Tank Bigsby 4-yard run (Cam Little kick), 1:41. Jaguars 32–16. **Drive: 3 plays, 10 yards, 0:13.**

**Top passers**

- NE – Drake Maye – 26/37, 276 yards, 2 TD
- JAX – Trevor Lawrence – 15/20, 193 yards, TD

**Top rushers**

- NE – Drake Maye – 3 rushes, 18 yards
- JAX – Tank Bigsby – 26 rushes, 118 yards, 2 TD

**Top receivers**

- NE – Hunter Henry – 8 receptions, 92 yards
- JAX – Brian Thomas Jr. – 5 receptions, 89 yards, TD

==== Week 8: vs. Green Bay Packers ====
Week Eight: Green Bay Packers at Jacksonville Jaguars – Game summary

Quarter	1	2	3	4	Total
**Packers**	0	13	7	10	**30**
Jaguars	0	10	7	10	**27**

at EverBank Stadium, Jacksonville, Florida

- Date: October 27
- Game time: 1:00 p.m. EDT
- Game weather: 84 °F (29 °C)
- Game attendance: 65,618
- Referee: Land Clark
- TV announcers (Fox): Kenny Albert, Jonathan Vilma and Megan Olivi
- Recap, Game Book

Game information

**First quarter**

- No scoring plays.

**Second quarter**

- GB – Josh Jacobs 3-yard run (Brandon McManus kick), 11:31. Packers 7–0. **Drive: 3 plays, 28 yards, 1:25.**
- GB – Brandon McManus 31-yard field goal, 6:03. Packers 10–0. **Drive: 6 plays, 67 yards, 3:21.**
- JAX – Trevor Lawrence 6-yard run (Cam Little kick), 2:37. Packers 10–7. **Drive: 6 plays, 70 yards, 3:26.**
- GB – Brandon McManus 38-yard field goal, 0:54. Packers 13–7. **Drive: 10 plays, 51 yards, 1:43.**
- JAX – Cam Little 39-yard field goal, 0:03. Packers 13–10. **Drive: 6 plays, 53 yards, 0:51.**

**Third quarter**

- JAX – Brian Thomas Jr. 14-yard pass from Trevor Lawrence (Cam Little kick), 5:10. Jaguars 17–13. **Drive: 10 plays, 93 yards, 5:33.**
- GB – Josh Jacobs 38-yard run (Brandon McManus kick), 0:21. Packers 20–17. **Drive: 8 plays, 80 yards, 4:49.**

**Fourth quarter**

- GB – Tucker Kraft 3-yard pass from Malik Willis (Brandon McManus kick), 14:06. Packers 27–17. **Drive: 2 plays, 5 yards, 0:40.**
- JAX – Cam Little 47-yard field goal, 5:36. Packers 27–20. **Drive: 8 plays, 51 yards, 4:04.**
- JAX – Evan Engram 14-yard pass from Trevor Lawrence (Cam Little kick), 1:48. Tied 27–27. **Drive: 8 plays, 87 yards, 2:02.**
- GB – Brandon McManus 24-yard field goal, 0:00. Packers 30–27. **Drive: 8 plays, 64 yards, 1:48.**

**Top passers**

- GB – Jordan Love – 14/22, 196 yards, INT
- JAX – Trevor Lawrence – 21/32, 308 yards, 2 TD, INT

**Top rushers**

- GB – Josh Jacobs – 25 rushes, 127 yards, 2 TD
- JAX – Tank Bigsby – 18 rushes, 78 yards

**Top receivers**

- GB – Tucker Kraft – 3 receptions, 78 yards, TD
- JAX – Brian Thomas Jr. – 3 receptions, 60 yards, TD

==== Week 9: at Philadelphia Eagles ====
Week Nine: Jacksonville Jaguars at Philadelphia Eagles – Game summary

Quarter	1	2	3	4	Total
Jaguars	0	0	16	7	**23**
**Eagles**	7	9	6	6	**28**

at Lincoln Financial Field, Philadelphia, Pennsylvania

- Date: November 3
- Game time: 4:05 p.m. EST
- Game weather: Clear, 57 °F (14 °C)
- Game attendance: 69,879
- Referee: Alan Eck
- TV announcers (CBS): Andrew Catalon, Tiki Barber, Jason McCourty and A.J. Ross
- Recap, Game Book

Game information

**First quarter**

- PHI – Saquon Barkley 20-yard pass from Jalen Hurts (Jake Elliott kick), 10:22. Eagles 7–0. **Drive: 2 plays, 20 yards, 0:48.**

**Second quarter**

- PHI – Jake Elliott 43-yard field goal, 9:20. Eagles 10–0. **Drive: 15 plays, 68 yards, 8:53.**
- PHI – Saquon Barkley 19-yard run (run failed), 0:22. Eagles 16–0. **Drive: 7 plays, 42 yards, 1:16.**

**Third quarter**

- PHI – Jalen Hurts 18-yard run (run failed), 9:25. Eagles 22–0. **Drive: 7 plays, 78 yards, 3:56.**
- JAX – Trevor Lawrence 1-yard run (Trevor Lawrence–Brian Thomas Jr. pass), 5:26. Eagles 22–8. **Drive: 10 plays, 61 yards, 3:59.**
- JAX – Travon Walker 35-yard fumble return (Trevor Lawrence–Evan Engram pass), 5:12. Eagles 22–16.

**Fourth quarter**

- PHI – DeVonta Smith 25-yard pass from Jalen Hurts (pass failed), 7:43. Eagles 28–16. **Drive: 8 plays, 91 yards, 5:08.**
- JAX – Trevor Lawrence 4-yard run (Cam Little kick), 4:04. Eagles 28–23. **Drive: 9 plays, 70 yards, 3:39.**

**Top passers**

- JAX – Trevor Lawrence – 16/31, 169 yards, 2 INT
- PHI – Jalen Hurts – 18/24, 230 yards, 2 TD

**Top rushers**

- JAX – Travis Etienne – 3 rushes, 24 yards
- PHI – Saquon Barkley – 27 rushes, 169 yards, TD

**Top receivers**

- JAX – Evan Engram – 5 receptions, 45 yards
- PHI – DeVonta Smith – 4 receptions, 87 yards, TD

==== Week 10: vs. Minnesota Vikings ====
Week Ten: Minnesota Vikings at Jacksonville Jaguars – Game summary

Quarter	1	2	3	4	Total
**Vikings**	3	0	3	6	**12**
Jaguars	7	0	0	0	**7**

at EverBank Stadium, Jacksonville, Florida

- Date: November 10
- Game time: 1:00 p.m. EST
- Game weather: 79 °F (26 °C)
- Game attendance: 65,695
- Referee: Adrian Hill
- TV announcers (Fox): Adam Amin, Mark Sanchez and Kristina Pink
- Recap, Game Book

Game information

**First quarter**

- MIN – John Parker Romo 45-yard field goal, 7:56. Vikings 3–0. **Drive: 12 plays, 53 yards, 5:29.**
- JAX – Mac Jones 1-yard run (Cam Little kick), 3:44. Jaguars 7–3. **Drive: 9 plays, 70 yards, 4:12.**

**Second quarter**

- No scoring plays.

**Third quarter**

- MIN – John Parker Romo 33-yard field goal, 1:42. Jaguars 7–6. **Drive: 14 plays, 72 yards, 8:19.**

**Fourth quarter**

- MIN – John Parker Romo 34-yard field goal, 7:14. Vikings 9–7. **Drive: 16 plays, 68 yards, 7:46.**
- MIN – John Parker Romo 29-yard field goal, 4:22. Vikings 12–7. **Drive: 5 plays, 14 yards, 2:13.**

**Top passers**

- MIN – Sam Darnold – 24/38, 241 yards, 3 INT
- JAX – Mac Jones – 14/22, 111 yards, 2 INT

**Top rushers**

- MIN – Aaron Jones – 17 rushes, 88 yards
- JAX – Travis Etienne – 11 rushes, 44 yards

**Top receivers**

- MIN – T. J. Hockenson – 8 receptions, 72 yards
- JAX – Evan Engram – 6 receptions, 40 yards

==== Week 11: at Detroit Lions ====
Week Eleven: Jacksonville Jaguars at Detroit Lions – Game summary

Quarter	1	2	3	4	Total
Jaguars	3	3	0	0	**6**
**Lions**	7	21	14	10	**52**

at Ford Field, Detroit, Michigan

- Date: November 17
- Game time: 1:00 p.m. EST
- Game weather: None (indoor stadium)
- Game attendance: 64,273
- Referee: Scott Novak
- TV announcers (CBS): Kevin Harlan, Trent Green and Melanie Collins
- Recap, Game Book

Game information

**First quarter**

- JAX – Cam Little 59-yard field goal, 9:34. Jaguars 3–0. **Drive: 9 plays, 29 yards, 5:24.**
- DET – David Montgomery 2-yard run (Jake Bates kick), 4:59. Lions 7–3. **Drive: 9 plays, 70 yards, 4:37.**

**Second quarter**

- DET – Jahmyr Gibbs 1-yard run (Jake Bates kick), 12:26. Lions 14–3. **Drive: 13 plays, 93 yards, 5:27.**
- DET – David Montgomery 6-yard run (Jake Bates kick), 6:39. Lions 21–3. **Drive: 8 plays, 64 yards, 4:12.**
- DET – Amon-Ra St. Brown 27-yard pass from Jared Goff (Jake Bates kick), 2:46. Lions 28–3. **Drive: 4 plays, 84 yards, 2:12.**
- JAX – Cam Little 35-yard field goal, 0:00. Lions 28–6. **Drive: 11 plays, 53 yards, 2:46.**

**Third quarter**

- DET – Jameson Williams 64-yard pass from Jared Goff (Jake Bates kick), 12:55. Lions 35–6. **Drive: 4 plays, 80 yards, 2:05.**
- DET – Brock Wright 5-yard pass from Jared Goff (Jake Bates kick), 4:16. Lions 42–6. **Drive: 14 plays, 83 yards, 7:49.**

**Fourth quarter**

- DET – Amon-Ra St. Brown 9-yard pass from Jared Goff (Jake Bates kick), 13:23. Lions 49–6. **Drive: 9 plays, 96 yards, 3:55.**
- DET – Jake Bates 54-yard field goal, 7:49. Lions 52–6. **Drive: 5 plays, 23 yards, 2:04.**

**Top passers**

- JAX – Mac Jones – 17/29, 138 yards, INT
- DET – Jared Goff – 24/29, 412 yards, 4 TD

**Top rushers**

- JAX – Travis Etienne – 12 rushes, 27 yards
- DET – David Montgomery – 15 rushes, 75 yards, 2 TD

**Top receivers**

- JAX – Brian Thomas Jr. – 5 receptions, 82 yards
- DET – Amon-Ra St. Brown – 11 receptions, 161 yards, 2 TD

==== Week 13: vs. Houston Texans ====
Week Thirteen: Houston Texans at Jacksonville Jaguars – Game summary

Quarter	1	2	3	4	Total
**Texans**	0	6	10	7	**23**
Jaguars	0	3	3	14	**20**

at EverBank Stadium, Jacksonville, Florida

- Date: December 1
- Game time: 1:00 p.m. EST
- Game weather: 56 °F (13 °C)
- Game attendance: 62,588
- Referee: Land Clark
- TV announcers (Fox): Kevin Kugler, Daryl Johnston and Laura Okmin
- Recap, Game Book

Game information

**First quarter**

- No scoring plays.

**Second quarter**

- HOU – Kaʻimi Fairbairn 53-yard field goal, 14:51. Texans 3–0. **Drive: 5 plays, 40 yards, 2:06.**
- HOU – Kaʻimi Fairbairn 30-yard field goal, 6:26. Texans 6–0. **Drive: 11 plays, 33 yards, 6:51.**
- JAX – Cam Little 33-yard field goal, 0:08. Texans 6–3. **Drive: 14 plays, 53 yards, 6:18.**

**Third quarter**

- JAX – Cam Little 30-yard field goal, 10:06. Tied 6–6. **Drive: 9 plays, 68 yards, 3:24.**
- HOU – Joe Mixon 7-yard run (Kaʻimi Fairbairn kick), 8:04. Texans 13–6. **Drive: 5 plays, 70 yards, 2:02.**
- HOU – Kaʻimi Fairbairn 28-yard field goal, 1:16. Texans 16–6. **Drive: 10 plays, 41 yards, 4:56.**

**Fourth quarter**

- HOU – Dalton Schultz 22-yard pass from C. J. Stroud (Kaʻimi Fairbairn kick), 12:11. Texans 23–6. **Drive: 5 plays, 55 yards, 1:46.**
- JAX – Parker Washington 22-yard pass from Mac Jones (pass failed), 7:49. Texans 23–12. **Drive: 12 plays, 72 yards, 4:22.**
- JAX – Brian Thomas Jr. 6-yard pass from Mac Jones (Mac Jones–Parker Washington pass), 3:31. Texans 23–20. **Drive: 10 plays, 84 yards, 2:26.**

**Top passers**

- HOU – C. J. Stroud – 22/34, 242 yards, TD
- JAX – Mac Jones – 20/32, 235 yards, 2 TD

**Top rushers**

- HOU – Joe Mixon – 20 rushes, 101 yards, TD
- JAX – Travis Etienne – 13 rushes, 46 yards

**Top receivers**

- HOU – Nico Collins – 8 receptions, 119 yards
- JAX – Parker Washington – 6 receptions, 103 yards, TD

==== Week 14: at Tennessee Titans ====
Week Fourteen: Jacksonville Jaguars at Tennessee Titans – Game summary

Quarter	1	2	3	4	Total
**Jaguars**	0	0	0	10	**10**
Titans	3	0	3	0	**6**

at Nissan Stadium, Nashville, Tennessee

- Date: December 8
- Game time: 1:00 p.m. EST/12:00 p.m. CST
- Game weather: Cloudy, 53 °F (12 °C)
- Game attendance: 61,644
- Referee: Tra Blake
- TV announcers (CBS): Andrew Catalon, Tiki Barber, Jason McCourty and A.J. Ross
- Recap, Game Book

Game information

**First quarter**

- TEN – Nick Folk 46-yard field goal, 8:32. Titans 3–0. **Drive: 11 plays, 51 yards, 6:28.**

**Second quarter**

- No scoring plays.

**Third quarter**

- TEN – Nick Folk 39-yard field goal, 4:30. Titans 6–0. **Drive: 11 plays, 45 yards, 5:37.**

**Fourth quarter**

- JAX – Cam Little 23-yard field goal, 12:09. Titans 6–3. **Drive: 14 plays, 65 yards, 7:21.**
- JAX – Tank Bigsby 8-yard run (Cam Little kick), 6:46. Jaguars 10–6. **Drive: 7 plays, 81 yards, 3:21.**

**Top passers**

- JAX – Mac Jones – 23/31, 220 yards, 2 INT
- TEN – Will Levis – 19/32, 168 yards

**Top rushers**

- JAX – Tank Bigsby – 18 rushes, 55 yards, TD
- TEN – Tony Pollard – 21 rushes, 102 yards

**Top receivers**

- JAX – Brian Thomas Jr. – 8 receptions, 86 yards
- TEN – Calvin Ridley – 7 receptions, 59 yards

==== Week 15: vs. New York Jets ====
Week Fifteen: New York Jets at Jacksonville Jaguars – Game summary

Quarter	1	2	3	4	Total
**Jets**	7	0	10	15	**32**
Jaguars	7	6	3	9	**25**

at EverBank Stadium, Jacksonville, Florida

- Date: December 15
- Game time: 1:00 p.m. EST
- Game weather: 73 °F (23 °C)
- Game attendance: 63,251
- Referee: Brad Rogers
- TV announcers (Fox): Chris Myers, Mark Schlereth and Jen Hale
- Recap, Game Book

Game information

**First quarter**

- JAX – Brian Thomas Jr. 3-yard pass from Mac Jones (Cam Little kick), 8:37. Jaguars 7–0. **Drive: 13 plays, 70 yards, 6:23.**
- NYJ – Garrett Wilson 22-yard pass from Aaron Rodgers (Anders Carlson kick), 5:01. Tied 7–7. **Drive: 7 plays, 70 yards, 3:36.**

**Second quarter**

- JAX – Cam Little 28-yard field goal, 2:41. Jaguars 10–7. **Drive: 18 plays, 77 yards, 11:07.**
- JAX – Cam Little 23-yard field goal, 0:00. Jaguars 13–7. **Drive: 11 plays, 73 yards, 1:36.**

**Third quarter**

- NYJ – Anders Carlson 23-yard field goal, 10:28. Jaguars 13–10. **Drive: 7 plays, 45 yards, 4:32.**
- JAX – Cam Little 43-yard field goal, 8:05. Jaguars 16–10. **Drive: 7 plays, 45 yards, 2:23.**
- NYJ – Davante Adams 1-yard pass from Aaron Rodgers (Anders Carlson kick), 4:33. Jets 17–16. **Drive: 7 plays, 70 yards, 3:32.**

**Fourth quarter**

- JAX – Brian Thomas Jr. 19-yard pass from Mac Jones (pass failed), 10:58. Jaguars 22–17. **Drive: 8 plays, 73 yards, 3:52.**
- NYJ – Davante Adams 71-yard pass from Aaron Rodgers (Aaron Rodgers–Davante Adams pass), 3:24. Jets 25–22. **Drive: 4 plays, 87 yards, 0:55.**
- JAX – Cam Little 43-yard field goal, 1:51. Tied 25–25. **Drive: 7 plays, 42 yards, 1:33.**
- NYJ – Breece Hall 1-yard run (Anders Carlson kick), 1:05. Jets 32–25. **Drive: 7 plays, 70 yards, 0:46.**

**Top passers**

- NYJ – Aaron Rodgers – 16/30, 289 yards, 3 TD
- JAX – Mac Jones – 31/46, 294 yards, 2 TD, 2 INT

**Top rushers**

- NYJ – Aaron Rodgers – 6 rushes, 45 yards
- JAX – Travis Etienne – 14 rushes, 65 yards

**Top receivers**

- NYJ – Davante Adams – 9 receptions, 198 yards, 2 TD
- JAX – Brian Thomas Jr. – 10 receptions, 105 yards, 2 TD

==== Week 16: at Las Vegas Raiders ====
Week Sixteen: Jacksonville Jaguars at Las Vegas Raiders – Game summary

Quarter	1	2	3	4	Total
Jaguars	7	0	7	0	**14**
**Raiders**	0	13	0	6	**19**

at Allegiant Stadium, Paradise, Nevada

- Date: December 22
- Game time: 4:25 p.m. EST/1:25 p.m. PST
- Game weather: None (indoor stadium)
- Game attendance: 61,323
- Referee: Shawn Hochuli
- TV announcers (CBS): Andrew Catalon, Tiki Barber, Jason McCourty and A.J. Ross
- Recap, Game Book

Game information

**First quarter**

- JAX – Tank Bigsby 1-yard run (Cam Little kick), 1:32. Jaguars 7–0. **Drive: 6 plays, 29 yards, 2:32.**

**Second quarter**

- LV – Alexander Mattison 1-yard run (Daniel Carlson kick), 14:05. Tied 7–7. **Drive: 6 plays, 70 yards, 2:27.**
- LV – Daniel Carlson 49-yard field goal, 10:28. Raiders 10–7. **Drive: 6 plays, 33 yards, 2:11.**
- LV – Daniel Carlson 37-yard field goal, 3:56. Raiders 13–7. **Drive: 10 plays, 44 yards, 5:05.**

**Third quarter**

- JAX – Brian Thomas Jr. 62-yard pass from Mac Jones (Cam Little kick), 0:54. Jaguars 14–13. **Drive: 3 plays, 64 yards, 1:24.**

**Fourth quarter**

- LV – Ameer Abdullah 7-yard run (pass failed), 11:26. Raiders 19–14. **Drive: 10 plays, 70 yards, 4:28.**

**Top passers**

- JAX – Mac Jones – 25/39, 247 yards, TD
- LV – Aidan O'Connell – 24/38, 257 yards

**Top rushers**

- JAX – Tank Bigsby – 12 rushes, 50 yards, TD
- LV – Ameer Abdullah – 7 rushes, 38 yards, TD

**Top receivers**

- JAX – Brian Thomas Jr. – 9 receptions, 132 yards, TD
- LV – Brock Bowers – 11 receptions, 99 yards

==== Week 17: vs. Tennessee Titans ====
Week Seventeen: Tennessee Titans at Jacksonville Jaguars – Game summary

Quarter	1	2	3	4	Total
Titans	0	3	7	3	**13**
**Jaguars**	3	10	0	7	**20**

at EverBank Stadium, Jacksonville, Florida

- Date: December 29
- Game time: 1:00 p.m. EST
- Game weather: 72 °F (22 °C)
- Game attendance: 61,995
- Referee: Shawn Smith
- TV announcers (CBS): Spero Dedes, Adam Archuleta and Aditi Kinkhabwala
- Recap, Game Book

Game information

**First quarter**

- JAX – Cam Little 48-yard field goal, 10:46. Jaguars 3–0. **Drive: 9 plays, 38 yards, 4:14.**

**Second quarter**

- JAX – Parker Washington 2-yard pass from Mac Jones (Cam Little kick), 8:59. Jaguars 10–0. **Drive: 5 plays, 43 yards, 2:45.**
- JAX – Cam Little 44-yard field goal, 2:02. Jaguars 13–0. **Drive: 12 plays, 54 yards, 5:16.**
- TEN – Nick Folk 39-yard field goal, 0:00. Jaguars 13–3. **Drive: 10 plays, 50 yards, 2:02.**

**Third quarter**

- TEN – Nick Vannett 8-yard pass from Mason Rudolph (Nick Folk kick), 6:51. Jaguars 13–10. **Drive: 13 plays, 85 yards, 8:09.**

**Fourth quarter**

- JAX – Brian Thomas Jr. 11-yard pass from Mac Jones (Cam Little kick), 7:05. Jaguars 20–10. **Drive: 16 plays, 74 yards, 9:11.**
- TEN – Nick Folk 28-yard field goal, 2:02. Jaguars 20–13. **Drive: 12 plays, 60 yards, 5:03.**

**Top passers**

- TEN – Mason Rudolph – 19/31, 193 yards, TD, INT
- JAX – Mac Jones – 15/22, 174 yards, 2 TD

**Top rushers**

- TEN – Tyjae Spears – 20 rushes, 95 yards
- JAX – Travis Etienne – 15 rushes, 49 yards

**Top receivers**

- TEN – Calvin Ridley – 5 receptions, 84 yards
- JAX – Brian Thomas Jr. – 7 receptions, 91 yards, TD

==== Week 18: at Indianapolis Colts ====
Week Eighteen: Jacksonville Jaguars at Indianapolis Colts – Game summary

Quarter	1	2	3	4	OT	Total
Jaguars	7	6	0	10	0	**23**
**Colts**	7	13	0	3	3	**26**

at Lucas Oil Stadium, Indianapolis, Indiana

- Date: January 5, 2025
- Game time: 1:00 p.m. EST
- Game weather: None (retractable roof closed)
- Game attendance: 63,041
- Referee: Alex Kemp
- TV announcers (Fox): Jason Benetti, Brady Quinn and Sarah Kustok
- Recap, Game Book

Game information

**First quarter**

- IND – Alec Pierce 40-yard pass from Joe Flacco (Matt Gay kick), 13:50. Colts 7–0. **Drive: 3 plays, 70 yards, 1:10.**
- JAX – Tank Bigsby 1-yard run (Cam Little kick), 8:12. Tied 7–7. **Drive: 10 plays, 70 yards, 5:38.**

**Second quarter**

- JAX – Cam Little 53-yard field goal, 14:17. Jaguars 10–7. **Drive: 5 plays, 13 yards, 3:00.**
- IND – Jonathan Taylor 6-yard run (Matt Gay kick), 9:32. Colts 14–10. **Drive: 8 plays, 70 yards, 4:45.**
- IND – Matt Gay 49-yard field goal, 3:22. Colts 17–10. **Drive: 11 plays, 43 yards, 4:42.**
- JAX – Cam Little 28-yard field goal, 1:25. Colts 17–13. **Drive: 9 plays, 61 yards, 1:57.**
- IND – Matt Gay 36-yard field goal, 0:13. Colts 20–13. **Drive: 7 plays, 52 yards, 1:12.**

**Third quarter**

- No scoring plays.

**Fourth quarter**

- JAX – Parker Washington 9-yard pass from Mac Jones (Cam Little kick), 7:50. Tied 20–20. **Drive: 14 plays, 84 yards, 6:55.**
- IND – Matt Gay 45-yard field goal, 3:52. Colts 23–20. **Drive: 7 plays, 43 yards, 3:58.**
- JAX – Cam Little 53-yard field goal, 1:44. Tied 23–23. **Drive: 7 plays, 35 yards, 2:08.**

**Overtime**

- IND – Matt Gay 38-yard field goal, 5:23. Colts 26–23. **Drive: 11 plays, 50 yards, 4:37.**

**Top passers**

- JAX – Mac Jones – 20/32, 225 yards, TD, INT
- IND – Joe Flacco – 23/40, 264 yards, TD

**Top rushers**

- JAX – Tank Bigsby – 14 rushes, 39 yards, TD
- IND – Jonathan Taylor – 34 rushes, 177 yards, TD

**Top receivers**

- JAX – Brian Thomas Jr. – 7 receptions, 103 yards
- IND – Josh Downs – 10 receptions, 94 yards

=== Standings ===
==== Division ====
AFC South
	W	L	T	PCT	DIV	CONF	PF	PA	STK
^{(4)} Houston Texans	10	7	0	.588	5–1	8–4	372	372	W1
Indianapolis Colts	8	9	0	.471	3–3	7–5	377	427	W1
Jacksonville Jaguars	4	13	0	.235	3–3	4–8	320	435	L1
Tennessee Titans	3	14	0	.176	1–5	3–9	311	460	L6

==== Conference ====
AFC
Seed	Team	Division	W	L	T	PCT	DIV	CONF	SOS	SOV	STK
**Division leaders**
1	Kansas City Chiefs	West	15	2	0	.882	5–1	10–2	.488	.463	L1
2	Buffalo Bills	East	13	4	0	.765	5–1	9–3	.467	.448	L1
3	Baltimore Ravens	North	12	5	0	.706	4–2	8–4	.529	.525	W4
4	Houston Texans	South	10	7	0	.588	5–1	8–4	.481	.376	W1
**Wild cards**
5	Los Angeles Chargers	West	11	6	0	.647	4–2	8–4	.467	.348	W3
6 (Note: Pittsburgh clinched the #6 seed over Denver based on head-to-head victory.)	Pittsburgh Steelers	North	10	7	0	.588	3–3	7–5	.502	.453	L4
7	Denver Broncos	West	10	7	0	.588	3–3	6–6	.502	.394	W1
**Did not qualify for the postseason**
8	Cincinnati Bengals	North	9	8	0	.529	3–3	6–6	.478	.314	W5
9 (Note: Indianapolis finished ahead of Miami based on head-to-head victory.)	Indianapolis Colts	South	8	9	0	.471	3–3	7–5	.457	.309	W1
10	Miami Dolphins	East	8	9	0	.471	3–3	6–6	.419	.294	L1
11	New York Jets	East	5	12	0	.294	2–4	5–7	.495	.341	W1
12 (Note: Jacksonville finished ahead of New England and Las Vegas based on conference record. (Jacksonville 4–8 to New England 3–9 to Las Vegas 3–9))	Jacksonville Jaguars	South	4	13	0	.235	3–3	4–8	.478	.265	L1
13 (Note: New England finished ahead of Las Vegas based on strength of victory. (New England .471 to Las Vegas .353))	New England Patriots	East	4	13	0	.235	2–4	3–9	.471	.471	W1
14	Las Vegas Raiders	West	4	13	0	.235	0–6	3–9	.540	.353	L1
15 (Note: Cleveland finished ahead of Tennessee based on strength of victory. (Cleveland .510 to Tennessee .431))	Cleveland Browns	North	3	14	0	.176	2–4	3–9	.536	.510	L6
16	Tennessee Titans	South	3	14	0	.176	1–5	3–9	.522	.431	L6
**Tiebreakers** (Note: When breaking ties for three or more teams under the NFL's rules, they are first broken within divisions, then comparing only the highest ranked remaining team from each division.)
