= Andre Cisco =

American football player (born 2000)

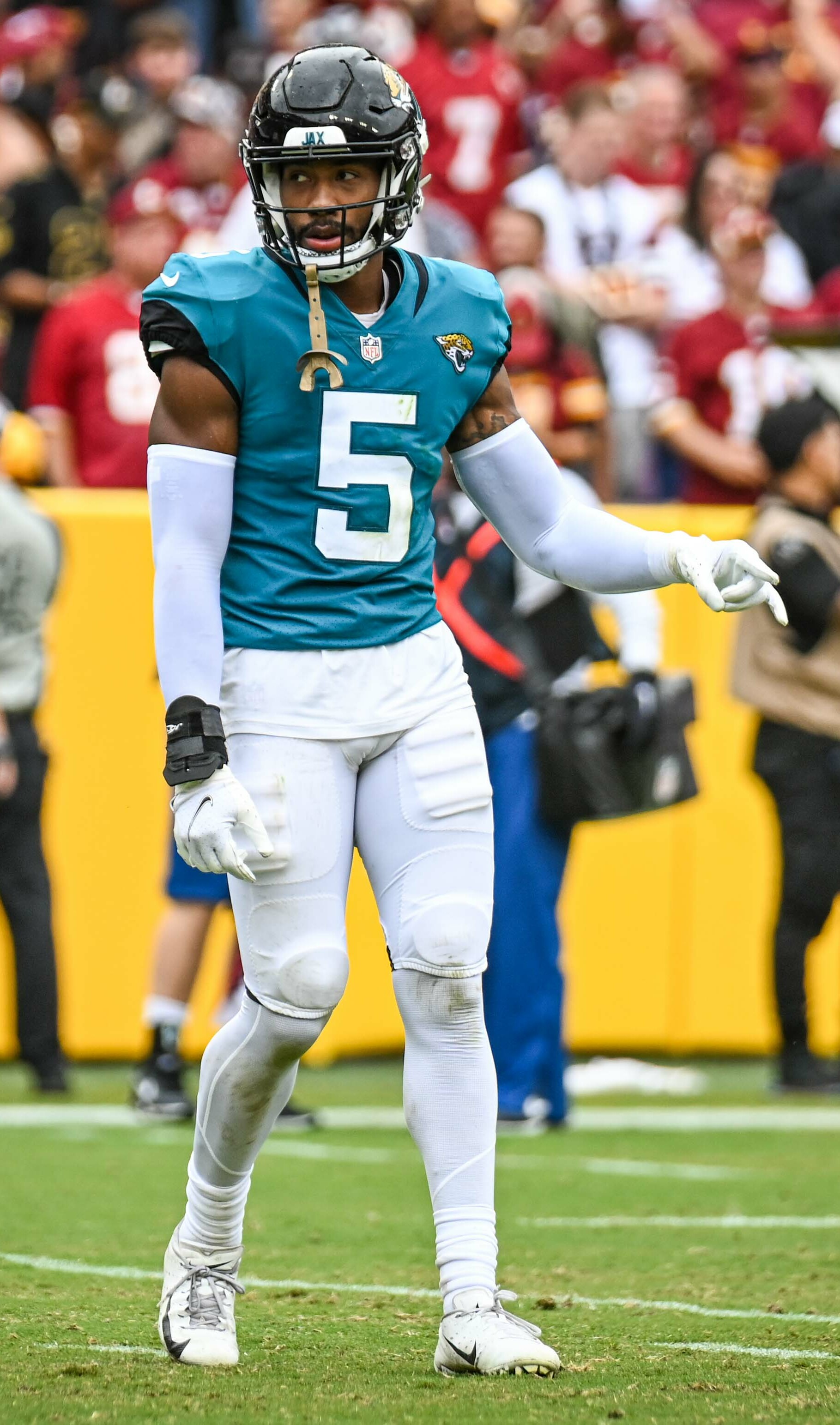
- Cisco with the Jacksonville Jaguars in 2022

No. 28 – Detroit Lions
- Position: Safety
- Roster status: Active

Personal information
- Born: March 23, 2000 (age 26); Queens, New York, U.S.
- Listed height: 6 ft 0 in (1.83 m)
- Listed weight: 210 lb (95 kg)

Career information
- High school: IMG Academy (Bradenton, Florida)
- College: Syracuse (2018–2020)
- NFL draft: 2021: 3rd round, 65th overall pick

Career history
- Jacksonville Jaguars (2021–2024); New York Jets (2025–2026); Detroit Lions (2026–present)

Awards and highlights
- ACC Defensive Rookie of the Year (2018); First-team All-All-ACC (2018); Second-team All-ACC (2019); Freshman All-American (2018)

Career NFL statistics as of Week 9, 2026
- Total tackles: 293
- Sacks: 2.5
- Forced fumbles: 4
- Fumble recoveries: 1
- Pass deflections: 26
- Interceptions: 8
- Defensive touchdowns: 1
- Stats at Pro Football Reference

Andre Jordan Cisco (born March 23, 2000) is an American professional football safety for the Detroit Lions of the National Football League (NFL). He played college football for the Syracuse Orange and was selected by the Jacksonville Jaguars in the third round of the 2021 NFL draft.

== Early life ==
Cisco grew up in Valley Stream, New York and attended St. Anthony's High School in South Huntington, New York, before transferring to IMG Academy in Bradenton, Florida, prior to his junior season. He committed to Syracuse University to play college football. Cisco stated he had never played a single snap on varsity in high school and had no scholarship offers. Prior to his junior season, he visited the IMG Academy and was offered enrollment after meeting with coaches.

== College career ==
As a freshman at Syracuse in 2018, Cisco started 11 of 13 games. He recorded 60 tackles and seven interceptions, which was tied for most in the nation. He was the Atlantic Coast Conference's Defensive Rookie of the Year and was a freshman All-American. He became the first true freshman in school history to earn All-American honors. On September 26, 2020, Cisco sustained a "lower body injury" while warming up for a game at Georgia Tech. On October 12, 2020, Syracuse head coach Dino Babers announced that Cisco would miss the remainder of the season due to a torn anterior cruciate ligament. Cisco started nine games his sophomore season, missing three due to injury, and had 65 tackles, five interceptions and a touchdown.

== Professional career ==
=== Pre-draft ===
On October 13, 2020, Cisco officially announced he would forego his remaining college eligibility to enter the draft after tearing his ACL. He was ranked as the sixth best safety prospect in the draft by Pro Football Focus. NFL analyst Bucky Brooks ranked Cisco fourth among all safeties while Dane Brugler of the New York Times ranked him fifth among all safeties.

Pre-draft measurables
Height	Weight	Arm length	Hand span	Wingspan	Bench press
6 ft 0 5/8 in (1.84 m)	216 lb (98 kg)	32 1/2 in (0.83 m)	10 5/8 in (0.27 m)	6 ft 5 1/4 in (1.96 m)	17 reps
All values from Pro Day

=== Jacksonville Jaguars ===
The Jacksonville Jaguars selected Cisco in the third round (65th overall) of the 2021 NFL draft. He was the fourth safety drafted in 2021 and was the highest safety drafted from Syracuse since Tebucky Jones and Donavin Darius in 1998. Analysts contributed Cisco's fall in the draft to his ACL injury during his last collegiate season. He was considered by analysts to be one of the biggest possible potential "steals" in the 2021 NFL draft. Jaguars' head coach Urban Meyer stated Cisco was one of his favorite players on the board, post draft.

"You watch him when he’s healthy and it’s hard to say he’s not the best safety in the draft."

— Urban Meyer, Jaguars head coach

==== 2021 ====
On June 11, 2021, the Jacksonville Jaguars signed Cisco to a four–year, $5.23 million contract that includes an initial signing bonus of $1.16 million. Although he was still recovering from an ACL tear, the Jaguars chose not to place him on the Active/ PUP list at the start of training camp. He instead remained listed as active and was able to compete against Andrew Wingard, Daniel Thomas, Josh Jones, Jarrod Wilson, Rudy Ford to be the starting strong safety under defensive coordinator Joe Cullen throughout training camp. Head coach Urban Meyer named Cisco as a backup safety to begin the regular season, behind starting safeties Rayshawn Jenkins and Andrew Wingard, as well as primary backup Daniel Thomas.

"Andre [Cisco], before his injury, was probably the top safety in the country. I think he had 13 interceptions in about roughly two years, and he fits all the boxes in terms of the size, the speed, the athleticism. So, we’re really excited about those two additions via the draft."

— Joe Cullen, Jaguars defensive coordinator

On September 12, 2021, Cisco made his professional regular season debut in the Jacksonville Jaguars' season-opener at the Houston Texans, but was limited to one solo tackle during the 21–37 loss. On December 16, 2021, the Jacksonville Jaguars fired head coach Urban Meyer due to multiple controversies. Offensive coordinator Darrell Bevell was inserted as the interim head coach for the remaining four games of the season. On December 20, 2021, interim head coach Darrell Bevell named Cisco the starting free safety for the last three games of the season after Rayshawn Jenkins was placed on injured reserve due to a broken ankle he injured the previous day during a 16–30 loss at the Houston Texans. On December 26, 2021, Cisco earned his first career start and recorded five combined tackles (two solo) and had one pass break up during a 21–26 loss at the New York Jets. The following week, he collected a season-high six combined tackles (five solo) and one pass deflection as the Jaguars were routed by the New England Patriots 10–50. He finished his rookie campaign in 2021 with a total of 26 combined tackles (19 solo), two pass deflections, and two forced fumbles while appearing in all 17 games with three starts.

==== 2022 ====
During training camp, Cisco competed against Andrew Wingard to be the starting safety under defensive coordinator Mike Caldwell. Head coach Doug Pederson named Cisco the starting free safety to begin the season, alongside Rayshawn Jenkins.

Cisco (#5) playing for the Jacksonville Jaguars in 2022

On September 18, 2022, Cisco made six combined tackles (four solo), broke up a pass, and made his first career interception off a pass by Matt Ryan intended for Parris Campbell during a 24–0 victory against the Indianapolis Colts. On October 2, 2022, Cisco recorded four combined tackles (three solo), a pass deflection, and intercepted a pass by Jalen Hurts to Zach Pascal, returning it 59–yards for his first career touchdown during a 29–21 loss at the Philadelphia Eagles. In Week 6, he collected a season-high nine combined tackles (six solo) as the Jaguars lost 27–34 at the Indianapolis Colts. He was sidelined for two games (Weeks 13–14) after injuring his shoulder. On December 22, 2022, he made three combined tackles (one solo) and had his first career sack on Zach Wilson during a 19–3 victory at the New York Jets. He finished his sophomore season with a total of 73 combined tackles (49 solo), ten pass deflections, three interceptions, and one sack while starting all 15 games he appeared in.

The Jacksonville Jaguars finished first in the AFC South with a 9–8 record to clinch a playoff berth. On January 14, 2022, Cisco started in his first career playoff game and recorded four solo tackles and broke up a pass during a 31–30 victory against the Los Angeles Chargers in the AFC Wildcard Game. The following week, he made four combined tackles (three solo) as the Jaguars were eliminated from the playoffs after losing 20–27 at the Kansas City Chiefs in the Divisional Round.

==== 2023 ====
He returned as the starting free safety in 2023, along with strong safety Rayshawn Jenkins. On September 10, 2023, he started in the Jacksonville Jaguars' season-opener at the Indianapolis Colts and collected a season-high ten combined tackles (seven solo) in their 31–21 victory. The following week, he had two combined tackles (one solo), a season-high two pass deflections, and intercepted a pass by Patrick Mahomes intended for Justin Watson during a 17–9 loss. He was inactive during a Week 8 victory at the Pittsburgh Steelers after injuring his hamstring. In Week 14, he recorded three solo tackles before exiting in the third quarter of a 27–31 loss at the Cleveland Browns. The following week, Cisco remained inactive due to his injury as the Jaguars lost 7–23 against the Baltimore Ravens. He finished the 2023 NFL season with a total of 62 combined tackles (42 solo), five pass deflections, four interceptions, and was credited with half a sack in 15 games and 15 starts.

==== 2024 ====
On January 8, 2024, Jacksonville Jaguars head coach Doug Pederson fired defensive coordinator Mike Caldwell and the entire defensive staff. Head coach Doug Pederson retained Cisco as the starting free safety and paired him with starting strong safety Darnell Savage.

On January 22, 2024, the Jacksonville Jaguars hired former Atlanta Falcons' defensive coordinator Ryan Nielsen to take over the same position with the Jaguars. Head coach Doug Pederson retained Cisco as the starting free safety and paired him with Darnell Savage. In Week 6, Cisco made seven combined tackles (three solo) and intercepted a pass by Caleb Williams during a 16–35 loss at the Chicago Bears. In Week 14, he recorded a season-high two pass deflections and had two combined tackles (one solo) during a 10–6 victory at the Tennessee Titans. On December 29, 2024, Cisco collected a season-high eight combined tackles (six solo) as the Jaguars defeated the Tennessee Titans 10–3. He was inactive as a healthy scratch for the Jaguars' Week 18 loss at the Indianapolis Colts. He finished with 68 combined tackles (44 solo), seven pass deflections, and one interception in 16 games and 16 starts.

=== New York Jets ===
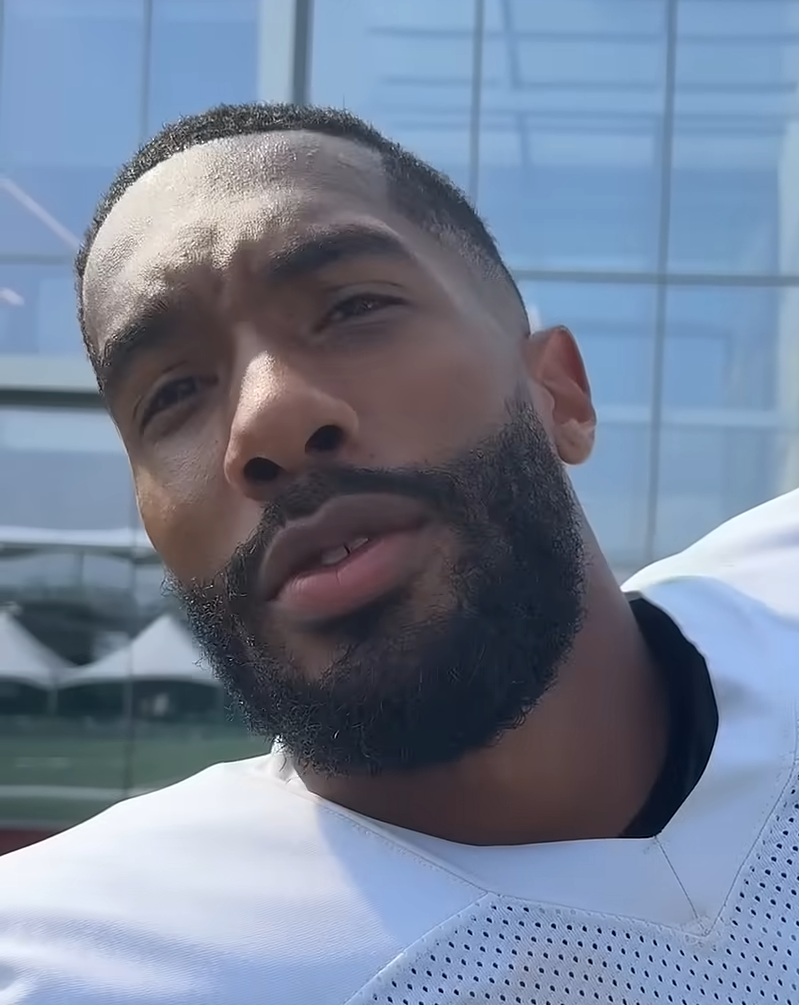
Cisco with the New York Jets in 2025

==== 2025 ====
On March 14, 2025, the New York Jets signed Cisco to a one–year, $8.50 million contract that includes $7.50 million guaranteed upon signing and an initial signing bonus of $5 million. He started all eight of his appearances for New York, recording one pass deflection, one fumble recovery, and 41 combined tackles. On October 28, it was announced that Cisco would require surgery to repair a pectoral tear. On November 3, head coach Aaron Glenn announced that Cisco would require season-ending shoulder surgery.

==== 2026 ====
On March 16, 2026, Cisco re-signed with the Jets on a one-year, $2.5 million contract.

=== Detroit Lions ===
On November 9, 2026, Cisco was traded to the Detroit Lions for a 2028 sixth-round pick.

== NFL career statistics ==
Legend
**Bold**	Career high

=== Regular season ===
Year	Team	Games		Tackles					Interceptions						Fumbles				
Year	Team	GP	GS	Cmb	Solo	Ast	Sck	TFL	Int	Yds	Avg	Lng	TD	PD	FF	Fmb	FR	Yds	TD
2021	JAX	17	3	26	19	7	0.0	0	0	0	0.0	0	0	2	**2**	0	0	0	0
2022	JAX	15	15	**73**	**49**	**24**	**1.0**	1	3	**68**	**22.7**	**59**	**1**	**10**	0	0	0	0	0
2023	JAX	15	15	62	42	20	0.5	1	**4**	**68**	17.0	29	0	5	1	**1**	0	0	0
2024	JAX	16	14	68	44	**24**	0.0	1	1	22	22.0	22	0	7	0	0	0	0	0
2025	NYJ	8	8	41	26	15	0.0	1	0	0	0.0	0	0	1	0	0	**1**	0	0
2026	NYJ	9	4	23	17	6	**1.0**	**2**	0	0	0.0	0	0	1	1	0	0	0	0
Career		80	60	293	197	96	2.5	6	8	158	19.8	59	1	26	4	1	1	0	0

=== Postseason ===
Year	Team	Games		Tackles					Interceptions						Fumbles				
Year	Team	GP	GS	Cmb	Solo	Ast	Sck	TFL	Int	Yds	Avg	Lng	TD	PD	FF	Fmb	FR	Yds	TD
2022	JAX	2	2	8	7	1	0.0	0	0	0	0.0	0	0	1	0	0	0	0	0
Career		2	2	8	7	1	0.0	0	0	0	0.0	0	0	1	0	0	0	0	0
