= Brian Thomas Jr. =

American football player (born 2002)

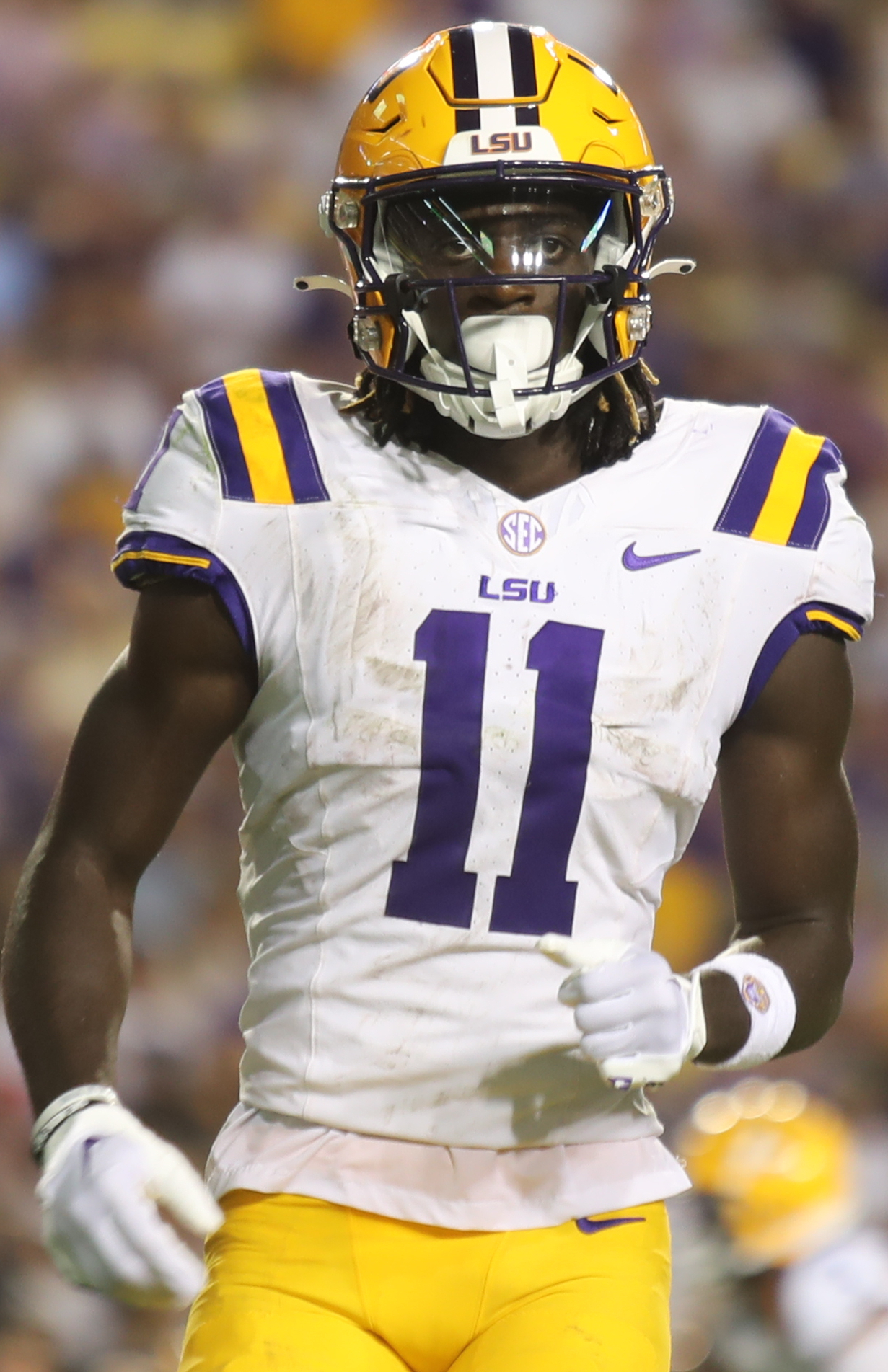
- Thomas with the LSU Tigers in 2023

No. 7 – Jacksonville Jaguars
- Position: Wide receiver
- Roster status: Active

Personal information
- Born: October 8, 2002 (age 24); Walker, Louisiana, U.S.
- Listed height: 6 ft 2 in (1.88 m)
- Listed weight: 209 lb (95 kg)

Career information
- High school: Walker
- College: LSU (2021–2023)
- NFL draft: 2024: 1st round, 23rd overall pick

Career history
- Jacksonville Jaguars (2024–present)

Awards and highlights
- Pro Bowl (2024); PFWA All-Rookie Team (2024); NCAA receiving touchdowns leader (2023); Second-team All-SEC (2023)

Career NFL statistics as of Week 7, 2026
- Receptions: 144
- Receiving yards: 2,094
- Total touchdowns: 13
- Stats at Pro Football Reference

Brian Thomas Jr. (born October 8, 2002) is an American professional football wide receiver for the Jacksonville Jaguars of the National Football League (NFL). He played college football for the LSU Tigers, leading the FBS in touchdown receptions in 2023. Thomas was selected by the Jaguars in the first round of the 2024 NFL draft.

== Early life ==
Thomas Jr. was born on October 8, 2002, in Walker, Louisiana and attended Walker High School. He played both football and basketball in high school. He had 30 receptions for 507 yards with seven touchdowns as a senior in 2020 and 75 receptions for 1,272 yards and 17 touchdowns as a junior. Thomas Jr. was selected to the 2021 All-American Bowl. He committed to Louisiana State University (LSU) to play college football.

== College career ==
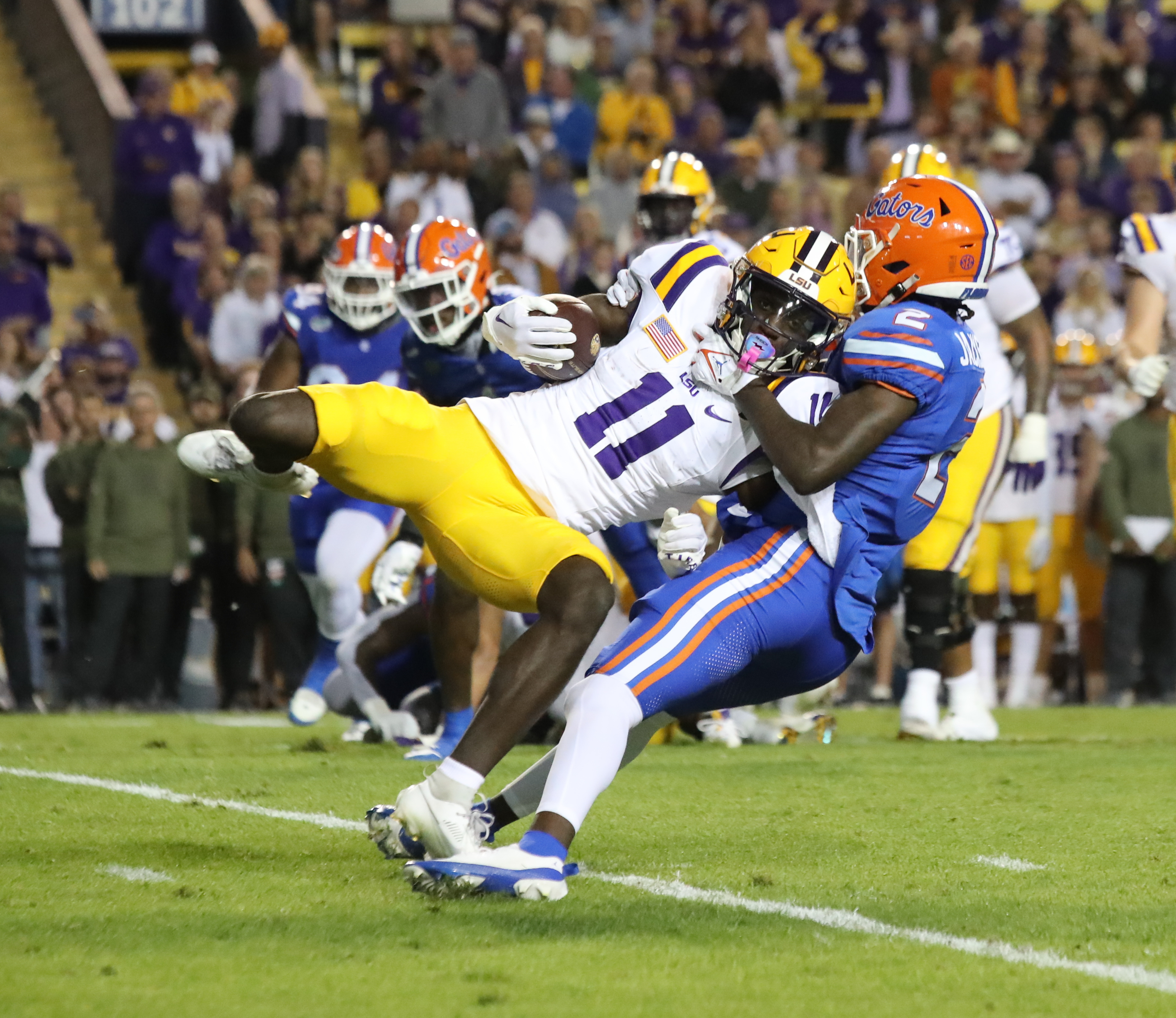
Thomas being tackled in a game against the Florida Gators in 2023

As a freshman at LSU in 2021, Thomas Jr. played in 12 games and had nine starts, recording 28 receptions for 359 yards and two touchdowns. As a sophomore in 2022, he started six of 13 games and had 31 receptions for 361 yards and five touchdowns. He led the FBS with 17 receiving touchdowns in 2023 and declared for the 2024 NFL draft following the season.

== Professional career ==
Pre-draft measurables
Height	Weight	Arm length	Hand span	Wingspan	40-yard dash	10-yard split	20-yard split	Vertical jump	Broad jump	Bench press
6 ft 2 7/8 in (1.90 m)	209 lb (95 kg)	32 3/4 in (0.83 m)	9 3/4 in (0.25 m)	6 ft 7 5/8 in (2.02 m)	4.33 s	1.50 s	2.55 s	38.5 in (0.98 m)	10 ft 6 in (3.20 m)	11 reps
All values from NFL Combine

Thomas was selected by the Jacksonville Jaguars in the first round with the 23rd overall selection in the 2024 NFL draft. He scored a receiving touchdown in his NFL debut, a 20–17 loss to the Miami Dolphins in week 1. In week 5 against the Indianapolis Colts, he had five receptions for 122 yards and a touchdown in the 37–34 victory. In week 15 against the New York Jets, he had ten receptions for 105 yards and two touchdowns in the 32–25 loss. In the following game against the Las Vegas Raiders, he had nine receptions for 132 yards and a touchdown in the 19–14 loss. In the 2024 season, Thomas finished with 87 receptions for 1,282 receiving yards and ten receiving touchdowns as a rookie, setting Jaguars rookie records for all three. He finished third in the league in receiving yards. He was named to the PFWA All-Rookie Team.

In the 2025 season, Thomas had 48 receptions for 707 yards and two touchdowns. He had a receiving touchdown in the Jaguars' Wild Card Round loss to the Buffalo Bills.

== NFL career statistics ==
Legend
**Bold**	Career high

=== Regular season ===
Year	Team	Games		Receiving						Rushing					Fumbles	
Year	Team	GP	GS	Tgt	Rec	Yds	Avg	Lng	TD	Att	Yds	Avg	Lng	TD	Fum	Lost
2024	JAX	17	16	**133**	**87**	**1,282**	**14.7**	**85**	**10**	**6**	**48**	**8.0**	**18**	0	0	0
2025	JAX	14	14	91	48	707	**14.7**	46	2	3	21	7.0	9	**1**	0	0
Career		31	30	224	135	1,989	14.7	85	12	9	69	7.7	18	1	0	0

=== Postseason ===
Year	Team	Games		Receiving						Rushing					Fumbles	
Year	Team	GP	GS	Tgt	Rec	Yds	Avg	Lng	TD	Att	Yds	Avg	Lng	TD	Fum	Lost
2025	JAX	1	0	2	2	21	10.5	18	1	0	0	0.0	0	0	0	0
Career		1	0	2	2	21	10.5	18	1	0	0	0.0	0	0	0	0
