= 2025 Pro Bowl Games =

National Football League all-star games

AFC	NFC
63	76
Head coach: Peyton Manning	Head coach: Eli Manning
- Date: January 30 and February 2, 2025
- Stadium: Nicholson Fieldhouse, University of Central Florida, Orlando, Florida, and Camping World Stadium (Orlando, Florida)
- Offensive MVP: Jared Goff (Detroit Lions)
- Defensive MVP: Byron Murphy (Minnesota Vikings)

Ceremonies
- National anthem: Presley Tennant

TV in the United States
- Network: ESPN; ABC; Disney XD; ESPN+; ESPN Deportes; NFL+
- Announcers: Scott Van Pelt (play-by-play), Dan Orlovsky, Jason Kelce (color), Marcus Spears, Laura Rutledge, and Michelle Beisner-Buck (sideline reporters)

The 2025 Pro Bowl Games was the National Football League (NFL)'s all-star game for the 2024 NFL season. This was the third year that the event consisted of skills competitions and a non-contact flag football game, and the final year that the event had skills competitions, with subsequent years only contesting the flag football game. The first block of skills competitions took place on January 30, 2025, around various venues in Central Florida though mainly at Nicholson Fieldhouse on the campus of the University of Central Florida in Orlando, Florida, while the flag football game and the other events took place on February 2 at Camping World Stadium in Orlando.

The NFC won both the skills events and flag football game, 20–13 and 56–50 respectively. This became the first (and ultimately, the only) pro bowl that a single conference outscored the other in both the skills events and the final flag football game. This also became the highest scoring Pro Bowl, breaking the record from the year before.

== Background ==
The NFL announced that Camping World Stadium in Orlando, Florida, would be the site for the games after hosting it the year before. Previously, Camping World Stadium hosted the Pro Bowl from 2017 to 2020 (no game was held in 2021 due to the COVID-19 pandemic).

== Format ==
The format consisted of various skill competition events and a 7-on-7 flag football game, with the first block of events held on January 30, 2025. On February 2, the remainder of the event program took place at Camping World Stadium (the full Madden NFL 25 game aired on February 1 with clips being shown on Sunday).

== Rosters ==
The fan voting ran between November 25 and December 23, 2024, with rosters announced on January 2, 2025. Three rookies were named to the initial roster: quarterback Jayden Daniels, tight end Brock Bowers, and outside linebacker Jared Verse. Later, rookie wide receivers Brian Thomas Jr. and Malik Nabers replaced Zay Flowers and Amon-Ra St. Brown, respectively, after the latter two went down with injury. After Lamar Jackson chose not to participate, he was replaced by rookie quarterback Drake Maye.

=== AFC ===
Offense
Position	Starter(s)	Reserve(s)	Alternate(s)
Quarterback	17 Josh Allen, Buffalo^{[d]}	9 Joe Burrow, Cincinnati; 8 Lamar Jackson, Baltimore^{[d]}	10 Drake Maye, New England^{[a]} 3 Russell Wilson, Pittsburgh^{[a]}
Running back	22 Derrick Henry, Baltimore^{[d]}	28 Joe Mixon, Houston; 28 Jonathan Taylor, Indianapolis	4 James Cook, Buffalo^{[a]}
Fullback	42 Patrick Ricard, Baltimore		
Wide receiver	1 Ja'Marr Chase, Cincinnati; 3 Jerry Jeudy, Cleveland	12 Nico Collins, Houston; 4 Zay Flowers, Baltimore^{[b]}	7 Brian Thomas Jr., Jacksonville^{[a]}
Tight end	89 Brock Bowers, Las Vegas	87 Travis Kelce, Kansas City^{[c]}	9 Jonnu Smith, Miami^{[a]}
Offensive tackle	73 Dion Dawkins, Buffalo; 78 Laremy Tunsil, Houston^{[b]}	70 Rashawn Slater, LA Chargers	79 Ronnie Stanley, Baltimore^{[a]}
Offensive guard	56 Quenton Nelson, Indianapolis; 62 Joe Thuney, Kansas City^{[c]}	65 Trey Smith, Kansas City^{[c]}	75 Joel Bitonio, Cleveland^{[a]} 73 Isaac Seumalo, Pittsburgh^{[a]}
Center	52 Creed Humphrey, Kansas City^{[c]}	64 Tyler Linderbaum, Baltimore	66 Connor McGovern, Buffalo^{[a]}

Defense
Position	Starter(s)	Reserve(s)	Alternate(s)
Defensive end	95 Myles Garrett, Cleveland; 91 Trey Hendrickson, Cincinnati	98 Maxx Crosby, Las Vegas^{[b]}	55 Danielle Hunter, Houston^{[a]}
Defensive tackle	97 Cameron Heyward, Pittsburgh; 95 Chris Jones^{[c]}, Kansas City	92 Nnamdi Madubuike, Baltimore^{[b]}	95 Quinnen Williams, NY Jets^{[a]} 98 Jeffery Simmons, Tennessee^{[a]}
Outside linebacker	15 Nik Bonitto, Denver; 90 T. J. Watt, Pittsburgh^{[b]}	52 Khalil Mack, LA Chargers^{[b]}	53 Kyle Van Noy, Baltimore^{[a]} 97 Joey Bosa, LA Chargers^{[a]}
Inside / middle linebacker	0 Roquan Smith, Baltimore^{[b]}	44 Zaire Franklin, Indianapolis	6 Patrick Queen, Pittsburgh^{[a]}
Cornerback	24 Derek Stingley Jr., Houston; 2 Patrick Surtain II, Denver	44 Marlon Humphrey, Baltimore; 21 Denzel Ward, Cleveland	
Free safety	39 Minkah Fitzpatrick, Pittsburgh		
Strong safety	14 Kyle Hamilton, Baltimore	3 Derwin James, LA Chargers	

Special teams
Position	Starter	Alternate(s)
Long snapper	46 Ross Matiscik, Jacksonville	
Punter	9 Logan Cooke, Jacksonville	
Placekicker	9 Chris Boswell, Pittsburgh	
Return specialist	19 Marvin Mims, Denver	
Special teams	41 Brenden Schooler, New England^{[b]}	28 Miles Killebrew, Pittsburgh^{[a]}

bold player who participated in the game
italics signifies a rookie
(C) signifies the player has been selected as a captain
^{a} Replacement player selection due to an injury or vacancy
^{b} Injured player; selected but did not participate
^{c} Selected but did not play because his team advanced to Super Bowl LIX (see Pro Bowl "Player Selection" section)
^{d} Selected but chose not to participate

=== NFC ===
Offense
Position	Starter(s)	Reserve(s)	Alternate(s)
Quarterback	16 Jared Goff, Detroit	14 Sam Darnold, Minnesota; 5 Jayden Daniels, Washington^{[d]}	6 Baker Mayfield, Tampa Bay^{[a]}
Running back	26 Saquon Barkley, Philadelphia^{[c]}	26 Jahmyr Gibbs, Detroit; 8 Josh Jacobs, Green Bay	7 Bijan Robinson, Atlanta^{[a]}
Fullback	44 Kyle Juszczyk, San Francisco		
Wide receiver	18 Justin Jefferson, Minnesota; 14 Amon-Ra St. Brown, Detroit^{[b]}	88 CeeDee Lamb, Dallas^{[b]} 17 Terry McLaurin, Washington^{[b]}	1 Malik Nabers, NY Giants^{[a]} 13 Mike Evans, Tampa Bay^{[a]} 11 Jaxon Smith-Njigba, Seattle^{[a]}
Tight end	85 George Kittle, San Francisco	85 Trey McBride, Arizona	
Offensive tackle	58 Penei Sewell, Detroit^{[b]} 65 Lane Johnson, Philadelphia^{[c]}	78 Tristan Wirfs, Tampa Bay	68 Taylor Decker, Detroit^{[a]} 75 Brian O'Neill, Minnesota^{[a]}
Offensive guard	69 Landon Dickerson, Philadelphia^{[c]} 73 Tyler Smith, Dallas	63 Chris Lindstrom, Atlanta	50 Robert Hunt, Carolina^{[a]}
Center	77 Frank Ragnow, Detroit	51 Cam Jurgens, Philadelphia^{[c]}	78 Erik McCoy, New Orleans^{[a]}

Defense
Position	Starter(s)	Reserve(s)	Alternate(s)
Defensive end	97 Nick Bosa, San Francisco; 11 Micah Parsons, Dallas	52 Rashan Gary, Green Bay	
Defensive tackle	97 Dexter Lawrence, NY Giants; 98 Jalen Carter, Philadelphia^{[c]}	50 Vita Vea, Tampa Bay	99 Leonard Williams, Seattle^{[a]}
Outside linebacker	58 Jonathan Greenard, Minnesota; 43 Andrew Van Ginkel, Minnesota	8 Jared Verse, LA Rams	
Inside / middle linebacker	54 Fred Warner, San Francisco	53 Zack Baun, Philadelphia^{[c]}	54 Bobby Wagner, Washington^{[a]}
Cornerback	1 Jaylon Johnson, Chicago; 7 Byron Murphy Jr., Minnesota	8 Jaycee Horn, Carolina; 21 Devon Witherspoon, Seattle	
Free safety	29 Xavier McKinney, Green Bay		
Strong safety	3 Budda Baker, Arizona	32 Brian Branch, Detroit	

Special teams
Position	Starter	Alternate(s)
Long snapper	42 Andrew DePaola, Minnesota	
Punter	3 Jack Fox, Detroit	
Placekicker	17 Brandon Aubrey, Dallas	
Return specialist	9 KaVontae Turpin, Dallas	
Special teams	12 KhaDarel Hodge, Atlanta	

bold player who participated in the game
italics signifies a rookie
(C) signifies the player has been selected as a captain
^{a} Replacement player selection due to an injury or vacancy
^{b} Injured player; selected but did not participate
^{c} Selected but did not play because his team advanced to Super Bowl LIX (see Pro Bowl "Player Selection" section)
^{d} Selected but chose not to participate

== Number of selections per team ==
American Football Conference
Team	Selections
Baltimore Ravens	11
Buffalo Bills	4
Cincinnati Bengals	3
Cleveland Browns	4
Denver Broncos	3
Houston Texans	5
Indianapolis Colts	3
Jacksonville Jaguars	3
Kansas City Chiefs	5
Las Vegas Raiders	2
Los Angeles Chargers	4
Miami Dolphins	1
New England Patriots	2
New York Jets	1
Pittsburgh Steelers	8
Tennessee Titans	1

National Football Conference
Team	Selections
Arizona Cardinals	2
Atlanta Falcons	3
Carolina Panthers	2
Chicago Bears	1
Dallas Cowboys	5
Detroit Lions	8
Green Bay Packers	3
Los Angeles Rams	1
Minnesota Vikings	7
New Orleans Saints	1
New York Giants	2
Philadelphia Eagles	6
San Francisco 49ers	4
Seattle Seahawks	3
Tampa Bay Buccaneers	4
Washington Commanders	3

== Broadcasting ==
ESPN and ABC had the rights to the Pro Bowl Games. ESPN, NFL+, and ESPN+ aired the Thursday events live while ABC aired the recording of the block on the Sunday after the event (prior to Sunday's events), while ESPN, ABC, Disney XD, ESPN+, ESPN Deportes and NFL+ aired the Sunday events live.

== Schedule and results ==
The events were held at Camping World Stadium. The first set of skills competitions were held on Thursday, January 30, 2025, and the second set were held on Sunday, February 2.

=== Thursday ===
==== Passing the Test ====
Passing the Test was an accuracy competition in which each quarterback from both conferences attempted to hit as many targets as possible in the given time, including six stationary targets and three moving targets. After all targets had been hit, the quarterback was allowed to hit it a second time for points. Quarterbacks attempted to hit targets for points until they were out of time. To determine how much time each quarterback had, the quarterbacks were matched with a Pro Bowl partner and asked to answer five trivia questions. Each quarterback started with 40 seconds of time, being awarded an additional 10 second for each correct answer.

Passing the Test results
Order	Quarterback	Team	Trivia partner	Team	Correct answers	Total time	Score
1	Joe Burrow	CIN	Nico Collins	HOU	2/5	60 seconds	27
2	Jared Goff	DET	Josh Jacobs	GB	5/5	90 seconds	44
3	Drake Maye	NWE	Jonnu Smith	MIA	4/5	80 seconds	22
4	Sam Darnold	MIN	Fred Warner	SF	5/5	90 seconds	39
5	Russell Wilson	PIT	Myles Garrett	CLE	5/5	90 seconds	31
6	Baker Mayfield	TB	Mike Evans	TB	3/5	70 seconds	27

Jared Goff won the event for the NFC with a score of 44, earning the NFC three points.

Conference	Score
AFC	0
NFC	3

==== Satisfying Catches ====
The NFC won this event, earning three points.

Conference	Score
AFC	0
NFC	6

==== The Big Spike ====
The AFC won this event, earning three points.

Conference	Score
AFC	3
NFC	6

==== Helmet Harmony ====
The NFC won this event 8–6, earning three points.

Conference	Score
AFC	3
NFC	9

==== Relay Race ====
Three races were held, and each was worth a single point. The NFC won the first race, the AFC won the second race, and the NFC won the third race.

Conference	Score
AFC	4
NFC	11

==== Dodgeball ====
Two games were held, and each was worth three points. The AFC won the first game and the NFC won the second game.

Conference	Score
AFC	7
NFC	14

=== Sunday ===
==== Flag Football First Quarter ====
The first quarter of the flag football game was played. The NFC outscored the AFC 13–6.

Conference	Score
AFC	13
NFC	27

==== Punt Perfect ====
This event was held between the first quarter and the second quarter of the flag football game. The AFC won this event 1–0 in three sudden death rounds after a 13–13 regulation tie and a 3–3 overtime tie, earning three points.

Conference	Score
AFC	16
NFC	27

==== Flag Football Second Quarter ====
The second quarter of the flag football game was played. The NFC outscored the AFC 12–6.

Conference	Score
AFC	22
NFC	39

==== Head to Head ====
This event was a Madden NFL livestream held the day before. The three points were officially added during halftime on Sunday (accompanied by a highlight reel). The AFC won the game 22–13, earning three points.

Conference	Score
AFC	25
NFC	39

==== The Great Football Race ====
This event was held during halftime of the flag football game. The NFC won this event, earning three points.

Conference	Score
AFC	25
NFC	42

==== Flag Football Third Quarter ====
The third quarter of the flag football game was played. The AFC outscored the NFC 14–13.

Conference	Score
AFC	39
NFC	55

==== Tug of War ====
This event was held between the third quarter and the fourth quarter of the flag football game. It was a best-of-three format, and the NFC won in a 2–0 sweep, earning three points.

Conference	Score
AFC	39
NFC	58

==== Flag Football Fourth Quarter ====
The fourth quarter of the flag football game was played. The AFC outscored the NFC 24–18.

Conference	Score
AFC	63
NFC	76

=== Overall score ===
In addition to the skills events, one game of flag football with four 12-minute quarters was played, with Sunday’s events being held between quarters.

Conference	Events	1st Quarter	Events	2nd Quarter	Events	3rd Quarter	Events	4th Quarter	Final
AFC	7	6	3	6	3	14	0	24	63
NFC	14	13	0	12	3	13	3	18	76
