= Esezi Otomewo =

American football player (born 1999)

No. 93 – Pittsburgh Steelers
- Position: Defensive tackle
- Roster status: Practice squad

Personal information
- Born: March 9, 1999 (age 27); Indianapolis, Indiana, U.S.
- Listed height: 6 ft 5 in (1.96 m)
- Listed weight: 282 lb (128 kg)

Career information
- High school: Ben Davis (Indianapolis)
- College: Minnesota (2017–2021)
- NFL draft: 2022: 5th round, 165th overall pick

Career history
- Minnesota Vikings (2022); Jacksonville Jaguars (2023–2024); Pittsburgh Steelers (2025–present)

Career NFL statistics as of 2025
- Total tackles: 18
- Sacks: 1.5
- Fumble recoveries: 1
- Stats at Pro Football Reference

Esezi Otomewo (born March 9, 1999) is an American professional football defensive tackle for the Pittsburgh Steelers of the National Football League (NFL). He played college football for the Minnesota Golden Gophers.

== Early life ==
Otomewo attended Ben Davis High School.

== College career ==
Otomewo initially committed to play college football for Western Michigan; he later decommitted and played for Minnesota from 2017 to 2021.

In 2021, Otomewo was named Honorable Mention All-Big Ten.

== Professional career ==
Pre-draft measurables
Height	Weight	Arm length	Hand span	Wingspan	40-yard dash	10-yard split	20-yard split	20-yard shuttle	Three-cone drill	Vertical jump	Broad jump	Bench press
6 ft 5 1/4 in (1.96 m)	282 lb (128 kg)	34 1/2 in (0.88 m)	9 in (0.23 m)	6 ft 9 3/8 in (2.07 m)	5.01 s	1.71 s	2.90 s	4.39 s	7.21 s	35.5 in (0.90 m)	9 ft 4 in (2.84 m)	21 reps
All values from NFL Combine/Pro Day

=== Minnesota Vikings ===
Otomewo was selected by the Minnesota Vikings in the fifth round, 165th overall, of the 2022 NFL draft. He made his NFL debut in Week 14 of the 2022 season against the Detroit Lions. He was waived on August 29, 2023.

=== Jacksonville Jaguars ===
On August 31, 2023, Otomewo was signed to the practice squad of the Jacksonville Jaguars. He signed a reserve/future contract with Jacksonville on January 8, 2024. He appeared in four games for Jacksonville during the 2024 season.

=== Pittsburgh Steelers ===
On March 19, 2025, Otomewo signed a one-year contract with the Pittsburgh Steelers.

On March 12, 2026, Otomewo re-signed with the Steelers on a one-year contract. Otomewo was waived by Pittsburgh as a part of final roster cuts on August 30; he was re-signed to the team's practice squad the following day.

== Personal life ==
Otomewo is of Nigerian descent.

== Career statistics ==
=== NFL ===
==== Regular season ====
Year	Team	Games		Tackles						Interceptions				Fumbles			
Year	Team	GP	GS	Cmb	Solo	Ast	Sck	TFL	QBH	Int	Yds	TD	PD	FF	FR	Yds	TD
2022	MIN	5	0	5	3	2	0.0	1	0	0	0	0	0	0	0	0	0
2024	JAX	4	2	4	0	4	0.5	0	2	0	0	0	0	0	1	0	0
2025	PIT	12	0	9	5	4	1.0	1	1	0	0	0	0	0	0	0	0
Career		21	2	18	8	10	1.5	2	3	0	0	0	0	0	1	0	0

==== Postseason ====
Year	Team	Games		Tackles						Interceptions				Fumbles			
Year	Team	GP	GS	Cmb	Solo	Ast	Sck	TFL	QBH	Int	Yds	TD	PD	FF	FR	Yds	TD
2025	PIT	1	0	2	0	2	0.0	0	0	0	0	0	0	0	0	0	0
Career		1	0	2	0	2	0.0	0	0	0	0	0	0	0	0	0	0

=== College ===
Year	Team	GP	Tackles				Interceptions				Fumbles		
Year	Team	GP	Total	Solo	Ast	Sack	PD	Int	Yds	TD	FF	FR	TD
2017	Minnesota	0	Did not play										
2018	Minnesota	13	14	9	5	1.0	0	0	0	0	1	1	0
2019	Minnesota	13	22	6	16	2.5	0	0	0	0	0	0	0
2020	Minnesota	7	15	11	4	1.0	0	0	0	0	0	0	0
2021	Minnesota	13	30	24	6	3.0	0	0	0	0	0	0	0
Career		46	81	50	31	7.5	0	0	0	0	1	1	0
