= Caleb Johnson (linebacker, born July 28, 1998) =

American football player (born 1998)

No. 47 – Houston Texans
- Position: Linebacker
- Roster status: Practice squad

Personal information
- Born: July 28, 1998 (age 28); San Diego, California, U.S.
- Listed height: 6 ft 2 in (1.88 m)
- Listed weight: 227 lb (103 kg)

Career information
- High school: Point Loma (San Diego)
- College: Houston Baptist (2016–2020)
- NFL draft: 2021: undrafted

Career history
- Chicago Bears (2021); Jacksonville Jaguars (2022–2024); Atlanta Falcons (2025)*; Miami Dolphins (2025); Houston Texans (2026–present)*
- * Offseason or practice squad member only

Awards and highlights
- Southland co-Defensive Player of the Year (2020)

Career NFL statistics as of 2025
- Total tackles: 40
- Forced fumbles: 1
- Fumble recoveries: 1
- Stats at Pro Football Reference

Caleb Johnson (born July 28, 1998) is an American professional football linebacker for the Houston Texans of the National Football League (NFL). He played college football at Houston Baptist.

== College career ==
Johnson played for the Houston Baptist Huskies for four seasons. As a senior, he recorded 49 tackles in four games in a shortened season after the Southland Conference fall football season was canceled due to the COVID-19 pandemic and was named the co-Defensive Player of the Year for the conference. He finished his collegiate career with 278 tackles, 27 tackles for loss, 10.0 sacks and seven fumble recoveries.

== Professional career ==
Pre-draft measurables
Height	Weight	Arm length	Hand span	Wingspan	40-yard dash	10-yard split	20-yard split	20-yard shuttle	Three-cone drill	Vertical jump	Broad jump	Bench press
6 ft 2 5/8 in (1.90 m)	226 lb (103 kg)	31 1/4 in (0.79 m)	9 1/4 in (0.23 m)	6 ft 5 1/2 in (1.97 m)	4.73 s	1.64 s	2.57 s	4.30 s	6.89 s	38.0 in (0.97 m)	10 ft 1 in (3.07 m)	19 reps
All values from Pro Day

=== Chicago Bears ===
Johnson signed with the Chicago Bears as an undrafted free agent on May 14, 2021. He was the first Houston Baptist player to sign an NFL contract and made the 53-man roster out of training camp.

On August 31, 2022, Johnson was waived by the Bears.

=== Jacksonville Jaguars ===
On September 1, 2022, Johnson was claimed off waivers by the Jacksonville Jaguars.

=== Atlanta Falcons ===
On May 12, 2025, Johnson signed with the Atlanta Falcons. He was waived on August 23.

=== Miami Dolphins ===
On October 1, 2025, Johnson signed with the Miami Dolphins' practice squad. He was promoted to the active roster on November 26. In two appearances for Miami, Johnson recorded two combined tackles. On December 12, Johnson was placed on injured reserve due to a shoulder injury suffered in Week 14 against the New York Jets.

=== Houston Texans ===
On August 23, 2026, Johnson signed with the Houston Texans. Johnson was waived by the Texans as a part of final roster cuts on August 30. On September 30, Johnson was re-signed to the Texans practice squad.

== NFL career statistics ==
=== Regular season ===
Year	Team	Games		Tackles				Fumbles				Interceptions			
Year	Team	GP	GS	Cmb	Solo	Ast	Sck	FF	FR	Yds	TD	Int	Yds	TD	PD
2021	CHI	14	0	8	4	4	0	0	1	0	0	0	0	0	0
2022	JAX	17	0	16	10	6	0	1	0	0	0	0	0	0	0
2023	JAX	17	0	5	4	1	0	0	0	0	0	0	0	0	0
2024	JAX	17	0	9	6	3	0	0	0	0	0	0	0	0	0
2025	MIA	2	0	2	1	1	0	0	0	0	0	0	0	0	0
Career		67	0	40	25	15	0	1	1	0	0	0	0	0	0

=== Postseason ===
Year	Team	Games		Tackles				Fumbles				Interceptions			
Year	Team	GP	GS	Cmb	Solo	Ast	Sck	FF	FR	Yds	TD	Int	Yds	TD	PD
2022	JAX	2	0	1	0	1	0	0	0	0	0	0	0	0	0
Career		2	0	1	0	1	0	0	0	0	0	0	0	0	0
