= Darnell Savage =

American football player (born 1997)

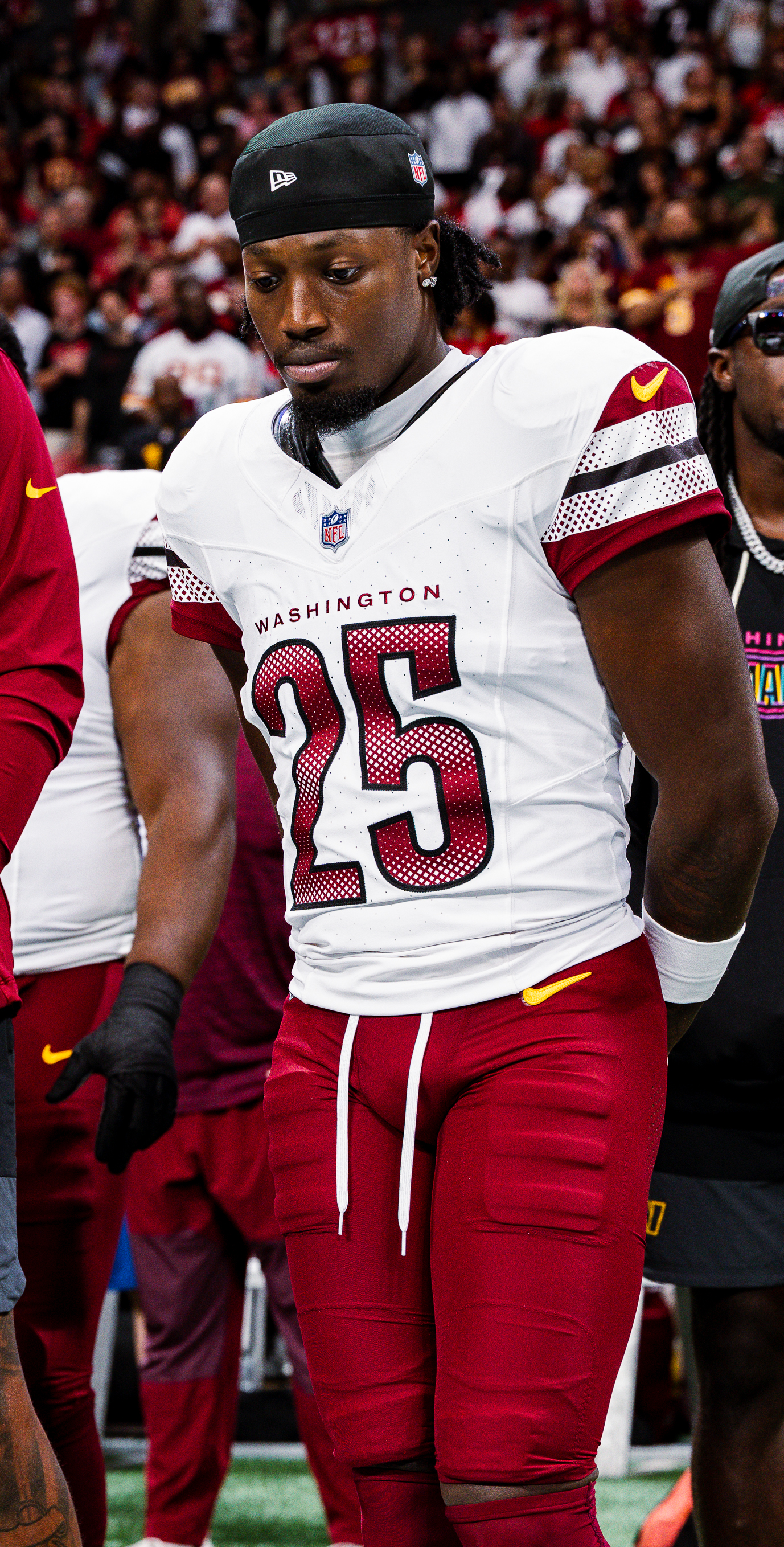
- Savage with the Washington Commanders in 2025

Profile
- Position: Safety

Personal information
- Born: July 30, 1997 (age 29); Newark, Delaware, U.S.
- Listed height: 5 ft 11 in (1.80 m)
- Listed weight: 198 lb (90 kg)

Career information
- High school: Caravel Academy (Bear, Delaware)
- College: Maryland (2015–2018)
- NFL draft: 2019: 1st round, 21st overall pick

Career history
- Green Bay Packers (2019–2023); Jacksonville Jaguars (2024–2025); Washington Commanders (2025); Buffalo Bills (2025); Pittsburgh Steelers (2026)*
- * Offseason or practice squad member only

Awards and highlights
- PFWA All-Rookie Team (2019); Second-team All-Big Ten (2018)

Career NFL statistics as of 2025
- Tackles: 371
- Sacks: 1
- Forced fumbles: 3
- Fumble recoveries: 2
- Pass deflections: 41
- Interceptions: 10
- Defensive touchdowns: 1
- Stats at Pro Football Reference

Darnell Henry Savage Jr. (born July 30, 1997) is an American professional football safety. He played college football for the Maryland Terrapins and was selected by the Green Bay Packers in the first round of the 2019 NFL draft. Savage has also played for the Jacksonville Jaguars, Washington Commanders, and Buffalo Bills.

== Early life ==
Savage attended Caravel Academy in Bear, Delaware. He suffered a broken femur during the second game of his junior year, ending his season prematurely. As a senior, Savage starred at running back and cornerback, rushing for 1,298 yards and 13 touchdowns, and recording 54 tackles. A 3-star recruit, Savage committed to the University of Maryland to play college football.

== College career ==
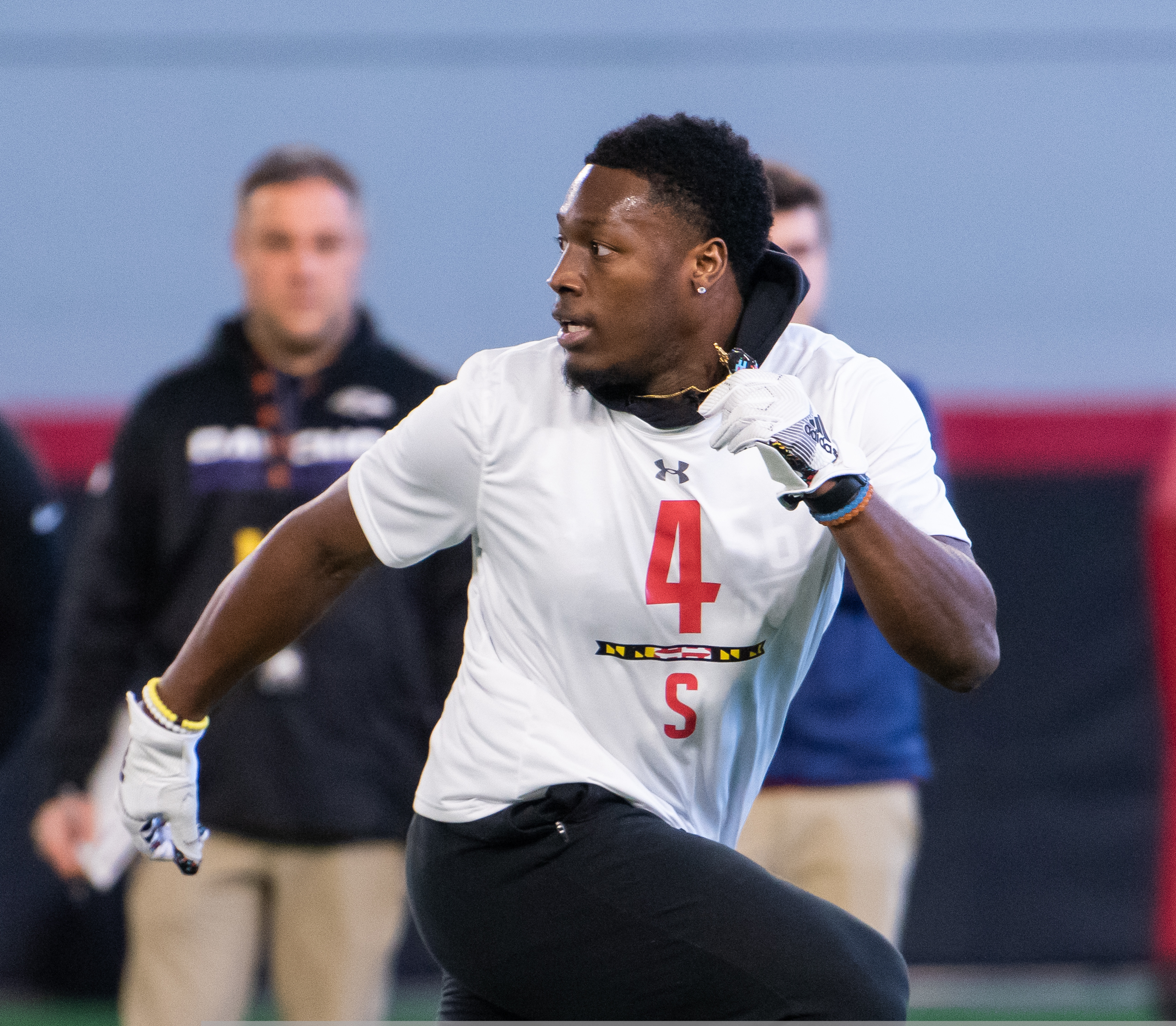
Savage with the Maryland Terrapins in 2019

Savage played at Maryland from 2015 to 2018. During his career, he had 182 tackles, eight interceptions, one sack and two touchdowns. He was named Honorable Mention All-Big Ten as a junior in 2017, and was named Second-Team All-Big Ten as a senior in 2018.

== Professional career ==
Savage participated in the Senior Bowl prior to the draft. NFL analyst Bucky Brooks had Savage ranked as the third best safety in the draft. ESPN analyst Jeff Legwold ranked Savage as the fifth best safety (48th overall) and Sports Illustrated ranked him the sixth best (50th overall) amongst safeties. Former NFL executive Gil Brandt had Savage ranked seventh (87th overall) amongst all prospects at his position. NFL draft analysts projected him to be a late first to second round pick. His 4.36 in the 40-yard dash impressed NFL scouts at the NFL Combine.

"Savage will offer an interesting litmus test for how teams value instincts, IQ and coverage quickness against size. He sports a compact frame with a muscular build and was actually bigger at the combine than some scouts expected. His sticky cover skills and ability to close on throws from all areas of the field are valuable commodities that should not be undervalued. Savage should be targeted as a Day 2 hybrid defender offering early starting potential as a two-high zone or slot cover talent."

— Lance Zierlein of NFL.com

Pre-draft measurables
Height	Weight	Arm length	Hand span	Wingspan	40-yard dash	10-yard split	20-yard split	20-yard shuttle	Three-cone drill	Vertical jump	Broad jump	Bench press
5 ft 10 3/4 in (1.80 m)	198 lb (90 kg)	31 in (0.79 m)	9 1/8 in (0.23 m)	6 ft 2 3/4 in (1.90 m)	4.36 s	1.45 s	2.58 s	4.14 s	7.03 s	39.5 in (1.00 m)	10 ft 6 in (3.20 m)	11 reps
All values from NFL Combine

=== Green Bay Packers ===
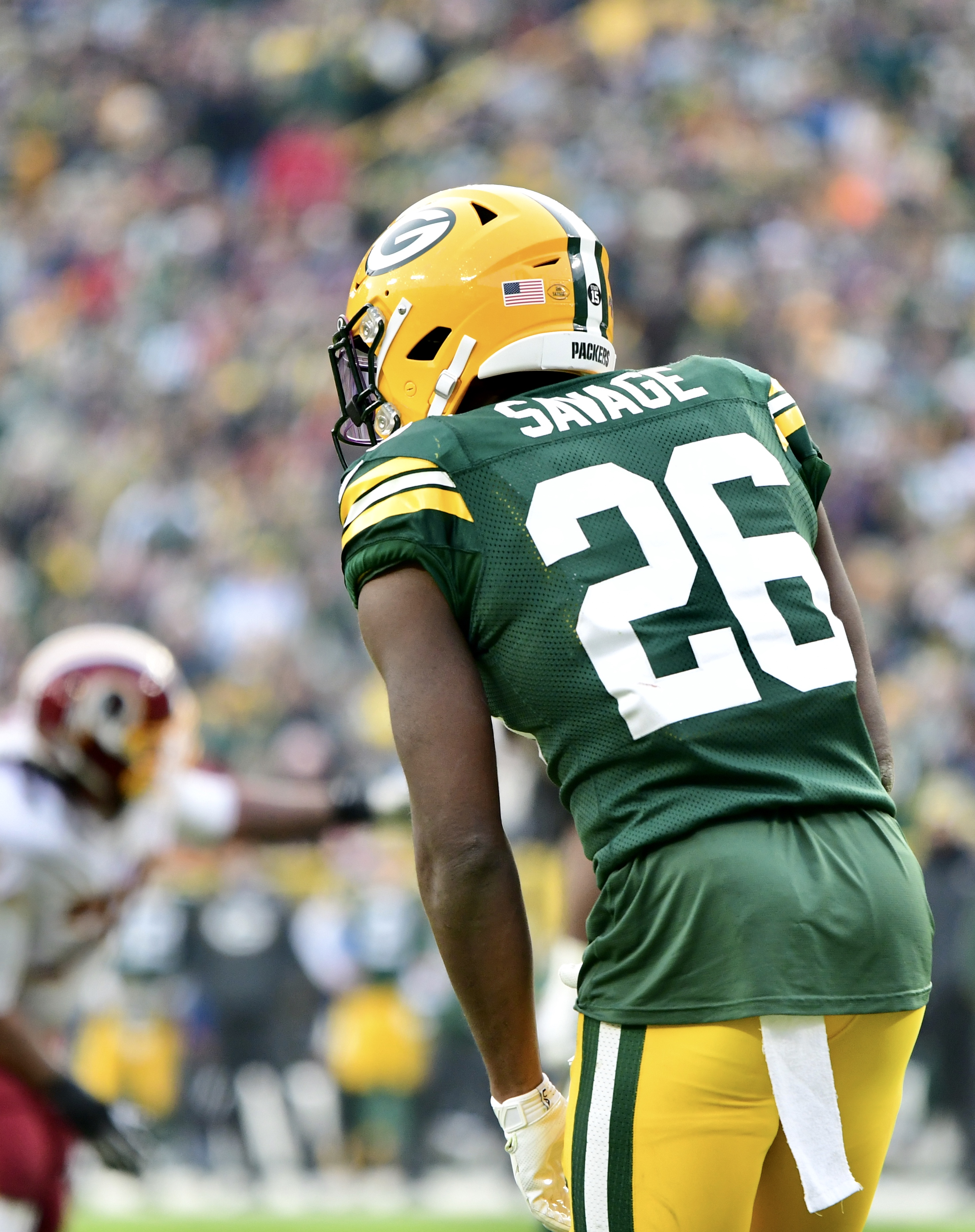
Savage with the Green Bay Packers in 2019

External videos
- Packers select Savage No. 21 in 2019
- NFL Draft Profile: Darnell Savage Jr.

The Green Bay Packers selected Savage in the first round (21st overall) of the 2019 NFL draft. Fearful Savage would not be available at 30th overall, the Green Bay Packers orchestrated a trade and acquired the first round (21st overall) pick from the Seattle Seahawks in exchange for a first round pick (30th overall) and two fourth round picks (114th and 118th overall). He was the first safety and defensive back drafted in 2019. He was drafted as the heir apparent to replace Ha Ha Clinton-Dix and Jermaine Whitehead at free safety. The Seattle Seahawks would go on to trade all three of the picks acquired.

"He's obviously a premiere athlete. He's been an impact player for Maryland for a number of years. He's able to close the gap, from centerfield and the hash. He's aggressive, physical player who can take the ball away. He fits what we're trying to do on the back end"

— Brian Gutekunst (Packers' GM)

==== 2019 ====
On May 2, 2019, the Green Bay Packers signed Savage to a four–year, $12.51 million contract that was fully guaranteed and included an initial signing bonus of $7.12 million.

He entered training camp as the de facto starting free safety under defensive coordinator Mike Pettine. Head coach Matt LaFleur named Savage and Adrian Amos the starting safety tandem to begin the regular season.

On September 5, 2019, Savage made his professional regular season debut and first career start in the Green Bay Packers' season-opener, recording three solo tackles and a pass deflection in a 10–3 victory at the Chicago Bears. The following week, he collected a season-high six solo tackles and broke up a pass during a 21–16 win in the Packers' home-opener against the Minnesota Vikings. On September 22, 2019, Savage broke up a pass and made his first career interception on a pass attempt thrown by Joe Flacco to wide receiver Emmanuel Sanders during a 27–16 win against the Denver Broncos. In Week 5, Savage made one tackle before he had to exit in the third quarter of a 34–24 win at the Dallas Cowboys due to an injury. He was diagnosed with a high ankle sprain and subsequently missed the next two games (Weeks 6–7). He returned in Week 8 and collected a season-high eight combined tackles (seven solo) in a 31–24 victory at the Kansas City Chiefs. He finished his rookie campaign in 2019 with a total of 50 combined tackles (38 solo), five pass deflections, two forced fumbles, and two interceptions in 14 games and 14 starts. He was named to the PFWA All-Rookie Team.

In their first season under head coach Mike LaFleur, the Green Bay Packers finished first in the NFC North with a 13–3 record, clinching a first round bye. On January 12, 2020, Savage started in his first career postseason game and made five solo tackles as the Packers defeated the Seattle Seahawks 28–23 in the Divisional Round. The following week, he collected eight combined tackles (five solo) during a 20–37 loss at the San Francisco 49ers in the NFC Championship Game.

==== 2020 ====
Head coach Matt LaFleur retained Savage and Adrian Amos as the starting safety tandem to start the season. He was inactive for a Week 7 victory at the Houston Texans due to a quadriceps injury. On November 29, 2020, Savage made one tackle, two pass deflections, and had a season-high two interceptions off passes thrown by Mitchell Trubisky during the 41–25 win against the Chicago Bears on Sunday Night Football. On December 27, 2020, Savage recorded five combined tackles (three solo), a season-high three pass deflections, and set a career-high with his fourth interception of the season off a pass by Ryan Tannehill intended for A. J. Brown during a 40–14 victory against the Tennessee Titans. The following week, he collected a season-high ten combined tackles (eight solo) in the Packers' 35–16 victory at the Chicago Bears. He finished the 2020 NFL season with a total of 75 combined tackles (56 solo), 12 pass deflections, four interceptions, one fumble recovery, and one sack in 15 games and 15 starts.

==== 2021 season ====
The Green Bay Packers hired former Los Angeles Rams linebacker coach Joe Barry as their new defensive coordinator. He retained Savage and Adrian Amos as the starting safeties. On December 25, 2021, Savage collected a season-high eight combined tackles (six solo), broke up a pass, and intercepted a pass by Baker Mayfield to Donovan Peoples-Jones during a 22–25 victory against the Cleveland Browns. He started all 17 games in 2021 and recorded 63 combined tackles (48 solo), nine pass deflections, and two interceptions.

==== 2022 ====
On April 29, 2022, the Green Bay Packers picked up the fifth-year option on Savage's rookie contract. Head coach Matt LaFleur opted to retain Savage and Adrian Amos as the starting safeties to begin the regular season.

On November 27, 2022, head coach Matt LaFleur benched Savage for the start of a 40–33 loss at the Philadelphia Eagles after a poor performance the prior week against the Tennessee Titans. Immediately after entering the game, Savage injured his foot and exited in the first quarter and subsequently was inactive for a Week 13 victory at the Chicago Bears. On January 1, 2023, Savage broke up a pass, had two combined tackles (one solo), and intercepted a pass thrown by Kirk Cousins to tight end T. J. Hockenson and returned it 75–yards for his first career touchdown as the Packers routed the Minnesota Vikings 41–17. He finished the 2022 NFL season with a total of 58 combined tackles (43 solo), five pass deflections, one touchdown, one fumble recovery, and one interception in 16 games and 15 starts.

==== 2023 ====
Defensive coordinator Joe Barry retained Savage as the starting free safety and paired him with Rudy Ford following the departure of Adrian Amos. On September 10, 2023, he started in the Green Bay Packers' season-opener at the Chicago Bears and collected a season-high nine combined tackles (five solo) during their 38–20 victory. On October 25, 2023, the Green Bay Packers placed Savage on injured reserve with a calf injury. On December 2, 2023, the Packers activated Savage off of injured reserve after he missed five games (Weeks 8–12). A shoulder injury sidelined Savage for two consecutive games (Weeks 15–16). He finished the season with 51 combined tackles (36 solo) and one pass deflection in ten games and ten starts. He earned an overall grade of 75.5 from Pro Football Focus which ranked 15th among all safeties that season.

External videos
- Darnell Savage 64-yard INT return

The Green Bay Packers finished the 2023 NFL season second in the NFC North with an 9–8, qualifying for a Wildcard position. On January 14, 2024, Savage started in the NFC Wildcard Game and made four combined tackles (three solo), broke up a pass, and intercepted a pass thrown by Dak Prescott to wide receiver CeeDee Lamb and returned it 64–yards for a touchdown as they defeated the Dallas Cowboys 48–32. On January 20, 2024, Savage started his in his last game as a member of the Green Bay Packers and recorded four combined tackles (two solo) and had one pass deflection during a 21–24 loss at the San Francisco 49ers in the Divisional Round.

=== Jacksonville Jaguars ===
On March 11, 2024, the Jacksonville Jaguars signed Savage to a three–year, $21.75 million contract that includes $12.5 million guaranteed and a signing bonus of $5 million. Head coach Doug Pederson named Savage and Andre Cisco the starting safety tandem to begin the season.

He injured his quadriceps and was subsequently inactive for three consecutive games (Weeks 2–5). On November 10, 2024, Savage made four combined tackles (three solo), one pass break up, and made his first interception with the Jaguars on a pass attempt by Sam Darnold to wide receiver Justin Jefferson during a 12–7 loss to the Minnesota Vikings. In Week 14, Savage made one solo tackle before suffering a concussion and exiting the 19–14 loss at the Las Vegas Raiders and was inactive for the following week during 20–13 win against the Tennessee Titans in Week 17. He finished with 51 combined tackles (40 solo), six pass deflections, and an interception in 13 games and 13 starts.

On September 16, 2025, Savage was released by the Jaguars.

=== Washington Commanders ===
On September 22, 2025, Savage signed with the Washington Commanders. In eight appearances for Washington, he recorded one pass deflection, one forced fumble, and 15 combined tackles. On December 4, the Commanders waived Savage upon his own request to be released.

=== Buffalo Bills ===
On December 6, 2025, the Buffalo Bills claimed Savage off waivers. He made two appearances (one start) for Buffalo, recording one pass deflection and two tackles.

=== Pittsburgh Steelers ===
On June 2, 2026, Savage signed a one-year, $1.5 million contract with the Pittsburgh Steelers. He was released by the Steelers following the signing of Rayshawn Jenkins on August 2.

== NFL career statistics ==
=== Regular season ===
Year	Team	Games		Tackles				Interceptions						Fumbles	
Year	Team	GP	GS	Comb	Total	Ast	Sck	PD	Int	Yds	Avg	Lng	TD	FF	FR
2019	GB	14	14	55	42	13	0.0	5	2	37	18.5	28	0	2	0
2020	GB	15	15	75	56	19	1.0	12	4	13	3.3	9	0	0	1
2021	GB	17	17	63	48	15	0.0	9	2	0	0.0	0	0	0	0
2022	GB	16	13	58	43	15	0.0	5	1	75	75	75	1	0	1
2023	GB	10	10	51	36	15	0.0	1	0	0	0.0	0	0	0	0
2024	JAX	13	13	51	40	11	0.0	6	1	16	0.0	16	0	0	0
2025	JAX	2	0	1	1	0	0.0	1	0	0	0.0	0	0	0	0
2025	WAS	8	0	15	9	6	0.0	1	0	0	0.0	0	0	1	0
2025	BUF	2	1	2	2	0	0.0	1	0	0	0.0	0	0	0	0
Career		97	83	371	275	96	1.0	41	10	141	13.9	75	1	3	2
Source: Pro-Football-Reference.com

=== Postseason ===
Year	Team	Games		Tackles				Interceptions						Fumbles	
Year	Team	GP	GS	Comb	Total	Ast	Sck	PD	Int	Yds	Avg	Lng	TDs	FF	FR
2019	GB	2	2	13	10	3	0.0	0	0	0	0.0	0	0	0	0
2020	GB	2	2	4	3	1	0.0	0	0	0	0.0	0	0	0	0
2021	GB	1	1	0	0	0	0.0	0	0	0	0.0	0	0	0	0
2023	GB	2	2	8	5	3	0.0	2	1	64	64.0	64	1	0	0
2025	BUF	1	0	3	2	1	0.0	0	0	0	0.0	0	0	0	0
Career		8	7	28	20	8	0.0	2	1	64	64.0	64	1	0	0
Source: pro-football-reference.com
