= DJ Coleman =

American football player (born 1998)

Profile
- Position: Defensive end

Personal information
- Born: September 2, 1998 (age 28); Atlanta, Georgia, U.S.
- Listed height: 6 ft 5 in (1.96 m)
- Listed weight: 283 lb (128 kg)

Career information
- High school: South Atlanta (Atlanta, Georgia)
- College: Jacksonville State (2018–2021); Missouri (2022)
- NFL draft: 2023: undrafted

Career history
- Jacksonville Jaguars (2023–2024); Birmingham Stallions (2025); Montreal Alouettes (2025)*
- * Offseason or practice squad member only

Career NFL statistics as of 2024
- Tackles: 3
- Stats at Pro Football Reference

DJ Coleman (born September 2, 1998) is an American professional football defensive end. He played college football for the Jacksonville State Gamecocks and Missouri Tigers and has been a member of the Jacksonville Jaguars in the National Football League (NFL).

== Early life ==
Coleman was born on September 2, 1998, in Atlanta, Georgia. He attended South Atlanta High School, where he played football as a defensive lineman and was named all-region. He was also invited to the APS All-Star Game and won defensive MVP honors there. He committed to play college football for the Jacksonville State Gamecocks over several other offers.

== College career ==
Coleman began playing for Jacksonville State in 2018, playing in 11 games that year while posting 11 tackles and 2.5 tackles-for-loss (TFLs). He then started 11 games in 2019, finishing with 59 tackles, fourth on the team, 10.5 TFLs and five sacks, leading the team in both categories. He was selected second-team All-Ohio Valley Conference (OVC) and a third-team FCS All-American by HERO Sports. In the 2020/21 season, he totaled 54 tackles, 12 TFLs and nine sacks, being named first-team All-OVC and second-team All-American while his sacks total placed second nationally. As a senior in the fall 2021 season, Coleman was an All-ASUN Conference selection after posting 55 tackles, 5.5 TFLs and 3.0 sacks.

Coleman entered the NCAA transfer portal after the season and transferred to the Missouri Tigers in 2022. He concluded his stint at Jacksonville State having made 179 tackles, 30.5 TFLs and 18 sacks in 47 games played. Coleman only played one season for the Tigers, appearing in 12 games while posting 37 tackles, 8.5 TFLs and 4.5 sacks. After the regular season, he declared for the NFL draft and opted-out of the team's bowl game.

== Professional career ==
=== Jacksonville Jaguars ===
After going unselected in the 2023 NFL draft, Coleman signed with the Jacksonville Jaguars as an undrafted free agent. He appeared in all three preseason games, totaling eight tackles. He was waived on August 29, 2023, then re-signed to the practice squad the following day. He signed a reserve/future contract after the season on January 9, 2024. In the 2024 preseason, he played in all three games, one as a starter, and tallied six tackles. Coleman was waived on August 27, 2024, then re-signed to the practice squad the following day. He was elevated to the active roster for the team's Week 15 game against the New York Jets and made his NFL debut in the game, appearing on 15 snaps and making three tackles. He was released from the practice squad on December 27, 2024.

=== Birmingham Stallions ===
On January 27, 2025, Coleman signed with the Birmingham Stallions of the United Football League (UFL). He was released on April 8, 2025.

=== Montreal Alouettes ===
Coleman signed with the Montreal Alouettes of the Canadian Football League on April 22, 2025. He was released on May 20, 2025.
