= Daniel Thomas (safety) =

American football player (born 1998)

No. 24 – Cleveland Browns
- Position: Safety
- Roster status: Active

Personal information
- Born: July 1, 1998 (age 28); Montgomery, Alabama, U.S.
- Listed height: 5 ft 10 in (1.78 m)
- Listed weight: 215 lb (98 kg)

Career information
- High school: Robert E. Lee (Montgomery)
- College: Auburn (2016–2019)
- NFL draft: 2020: 5th round, 157th overall pick

Career history
- Jacksonville Jaguars (2020–2024); Detroit Lions (2025); Cleveland Browns (2026–present)

Career NFL statistics as of 2025
- Total tackles: 94
- Fumble recoveries: 1
- Pass deflections: 3
- Interceptions: 1
- Stats at Pro Football Reference

Daniel Thomas (born July 1, 1998) is an American professional football safety for the Cleveland Browns of the National Football League (NFL). He played college football for the Auburn Tigers.

== Early life ==
Thomas grew up in Montgomery, Alabama and attended Robert E. Lee High School. As a senior, he was named first-team All-Metro and second-team ASWA Class 7A all-state after recording 87 tackles, five tackles for loss and seven interceptions, including two interceptions returned for a touchdown, while returning three punts for touchdowns. Rated a three-star recruit, Thomas was considering offers from Minnesota, Clemson, South Carolina, and North Carolina before signing with Auburn after receiving a late offer from the school on National Signing Day.

== College career ==
Thomas played in 11 games as a true freshman, recording 16 tackles and two interceptions. Both interceptions were against rival Alabama on November 26, 2016, starting in place of linebacker, Deshaun Davis, who suffered a knee sprain the week prior against Vanderbilt, becoming the first Auburn freshman with two turnovers in one game since 2009. Thomas played safety and the nickel back, and linebacker positions as a sophomore, finishing the season with 35 tackles, two sacks, one interception and three passes defended. Thomas became a starter going into his junior season and recorded 74 tackles with five passes defended, two interceptions, two forced fumbles and a sack. Thomas is described as a "positionless" player, a short stocky defender with run stopping force and ball skills that led the Tigers to a successful 9-4 record. Thomas recorded 74 tackles, 5.5 tackles for a loss, one pass defended and one forced fumble as a senior.

== Professional career ==
Pre-draft measurables
| Height | Weight | Arm length | Hand span | Wingspan | 40-yard dash | 10-yard split | 20-yard split | 20-yard shuttle | Three-cone drill | Vertical jump | Broad jump | Bench press |
|---|---|---|---|---|---|---|---|---|---|---|---|---|
| 5 ft 10 in (1.78 m) | 215 lb (98 kg) | 31 5/8 in (0.80 m) | 9 1/4 in (0.23 m) | 6 ft 2 3/8 in (1.89 m) | 4.51 s | 1.53 s | 2.66 s | 4.20 s | 7.04 s | 37.0 in (0.94 m) | 10 ft 5 in (3.18 m) | 24 reps |
All values from NFL Combine/Pro Day

=== Jacksonville Jaguars ===
Thomas was selected by the Jacksonville Jaguars in the fifth round with the 157th pick in the 2020 NFL draft. Jacksonville previously acquired this selection by trading Calais Campbell to the Baltimore Ravens. In Week 7 against the Los Angeles Chargers, he recorded a touchdown on a blocked punt in the 39–29 loss. In Week 11 against the Pittsburgh Steelers, Thomas recorded his first career interception off a pass thrown by Ben Roethlisberger and made a 53-yard return during the 27–3 loss. He was placed on injured reserve on November 24, 2020, with an arm injury.

On March 8, 2024, Thomas signed a two-year contract extension with the Jaguars.

On August 26, 2025, Thomas was released by the Jaguars as part of final roster cuts.

=== Detroit Lions ===
On August 27, 2025, Thomas signed with the Detroit Lions. On September 27, Thomas was placed on injured reserve due to a forearm injury sustained in the team's Week 3 victory over the Baltimore Ravens. He later underwent surgery to address the injury. Thomas was activated on November 8, ahead of the team's Week 10 matchup against the Washington Commanders.

=== Cleveland Browns ===
On March 20, 2026, Thomas signed with the Cleveland Browns on a two-year, $3 million contract.
