= P. J. Walker =

American football player (born 1995)

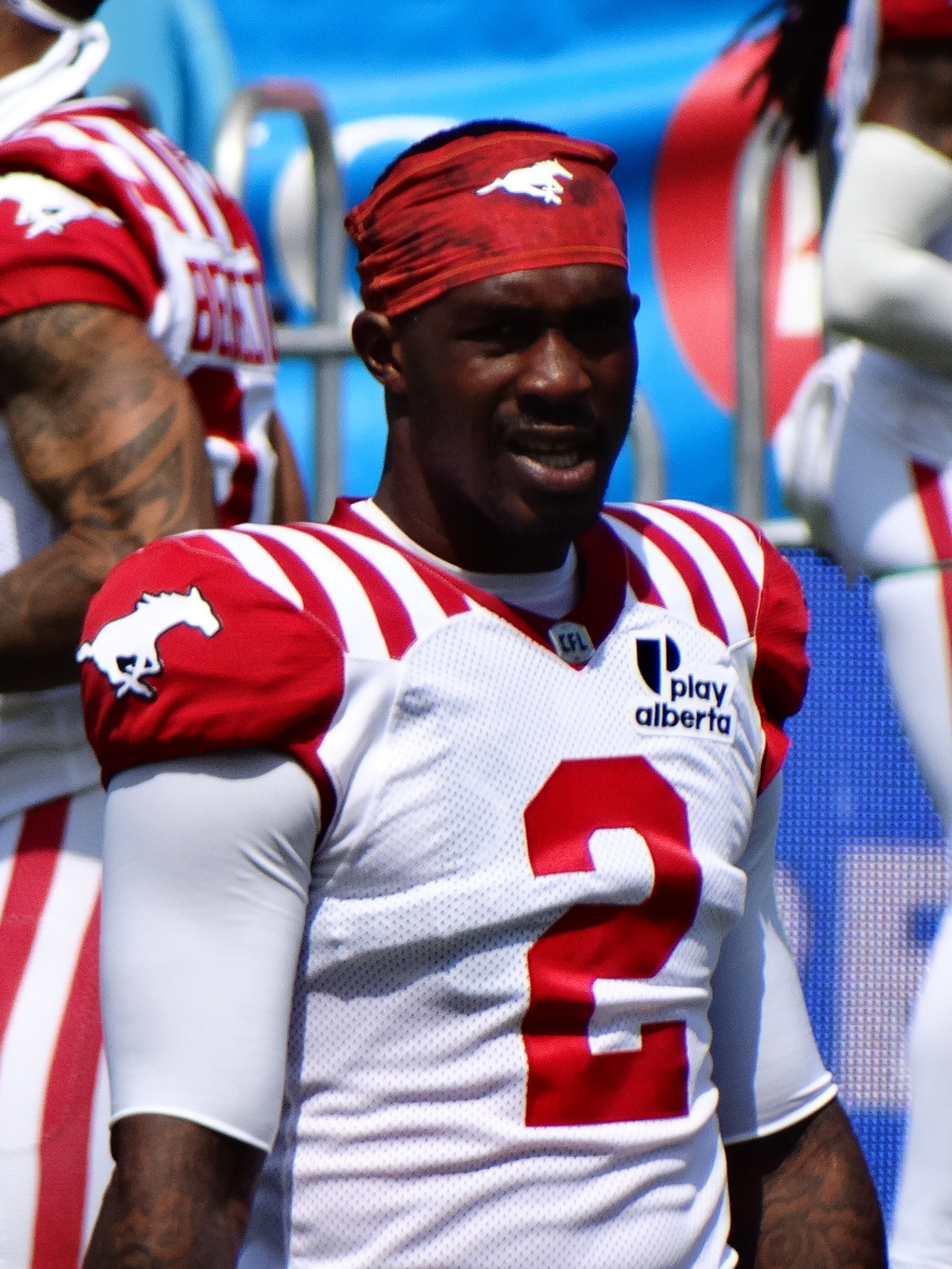
- Walker with the Calgary Stampeders in 2025

No. 11, 6, 10, 2
- Position: Quarterback

Personal information
- Born: February 26, 1995 (age 31); Elizabeth, New Jersey, U.S.
- Listed height: 5 ft 11 in (1.80 m)
- Listed weight: 215 lb (98 kg)

Career information
- High school: Elizabeth
- College: Temple (2013–2016)
- NFL draft: 2017: undrafted

Career history
- Indianapolis Colts (2017–2019)*; Houston Roughnecks (2020); Carolina Panthers (2020–2022); Chicago Bears (2023)*; Cleveland Browns (2023); Seattle Seahawks (2024)*; Calgary Stampeders (2024–2025)
- * Offseason or practice squad member only

Awards and highlights
- AAC Championship Game MVP (2016); Midseason All-XFL Team (2020); XFL passing yards leader (2020); XFL passing touchdowns leader (2020); NFL record: Longest recorded air completion in Next Gen Stats era (since 2016): 67.6 yards

Career NFL statistics
- Passing attempts: 339
- Passing completions: 185
- Completion percentage: 54.6%
- TD–INT: 6–16
- Passing yards: 2,135
- Passer rating: 60.0
- Stats at Pro Football Reference

Phillip Joseph "P. J." Walker Jr. (born February 26, 1995) is an American former professional football player who was a quarterback in the National Football League (NFL), XFL, and Canadian Football League (CFL). He played college football for the Temple Owls, and was signed as an undrafted free agent by the Indianapolis Colts in 2017. After two seasons on the Colts' practice squad, Walker played for the Houston Roughnecks XFL in 2020. He led the XFL in passing yards and touchdowns before the league suspended operations due to the COVID-19 pandemic. He started games in the NFL for the Carolina Panthers from 2020 to 2022 and the Cleveland Browns in 2023, as well as one game for the Calgary Stampeders of the CFL.

== Early life ==
Walker was born in 1995 in Elizabeth, New Jersey, to parents Tamicha Drake and Phillip Walker Sr. Walker attended Elizabeth High School. During his junior year, Walker threw for 2,168 yards and 18 touchdowns, while going 120-of-189 (63.5 percent) in passing percentage. Following the completion of his high school career, Walker chose to attend Temple University, under head coach Matt Rhule.

== College career ==
After accepting an athletic scholarship to attend Temple University, Walker played for coach Matt Rhule's Temple Owls team from 2013 to 2016.

=== 2013 season ===
Walker began his collegiate career as a backup to Connor Reilly. Walker would eventually earn the starting spot at quarterback in week 6 against Cincinnati, where he would throw his first collegiate touchdown. Walker obtained his first win of his career in week 7 against Army, by a score of 33–14. He would receive his first collegiate weekly award (QB of the week – CFPA – honorable mention) following a 59–49 loss to SMU in week 9. In the final week of the season, Walker earned American Athletic Conference Offensive Player of the Week and was a finalist for the Manning Award. Walker would finish his freshman year having started 7 out of 12 games.

=== 2014 season ===
Walker's sophomore season did not include as many highlights as his 2013 debut performance; however, Walker did earn career-high completions (29) and pass attempts (49) in a losing effort against Navy in Week 2. Walker was able to secure three honorable mentions during the season (Weeks 1, 2 and 4) and passed for at least 1 touchdown in his first seven games.

=== 2015 season ===
Walker would start every game in his junior year, becoming only the third person to do so in Owl history. In a rare feat, Walker would both throw for and receive a pass in two two-point conversion attempts in Week 8 in a winning effort against UCF. Walker would lead the Owls to a 10–4 overall record (7–1 in conference play), earning a bid to the Boca Raton Bowl in losing effort against the Toledo Rockets by a score of 32–17. He finished the season with a school record 2,972 passing yards and tied the record for total offense (rushing and passing) with 3,179 yards.

=== 2016 season ===
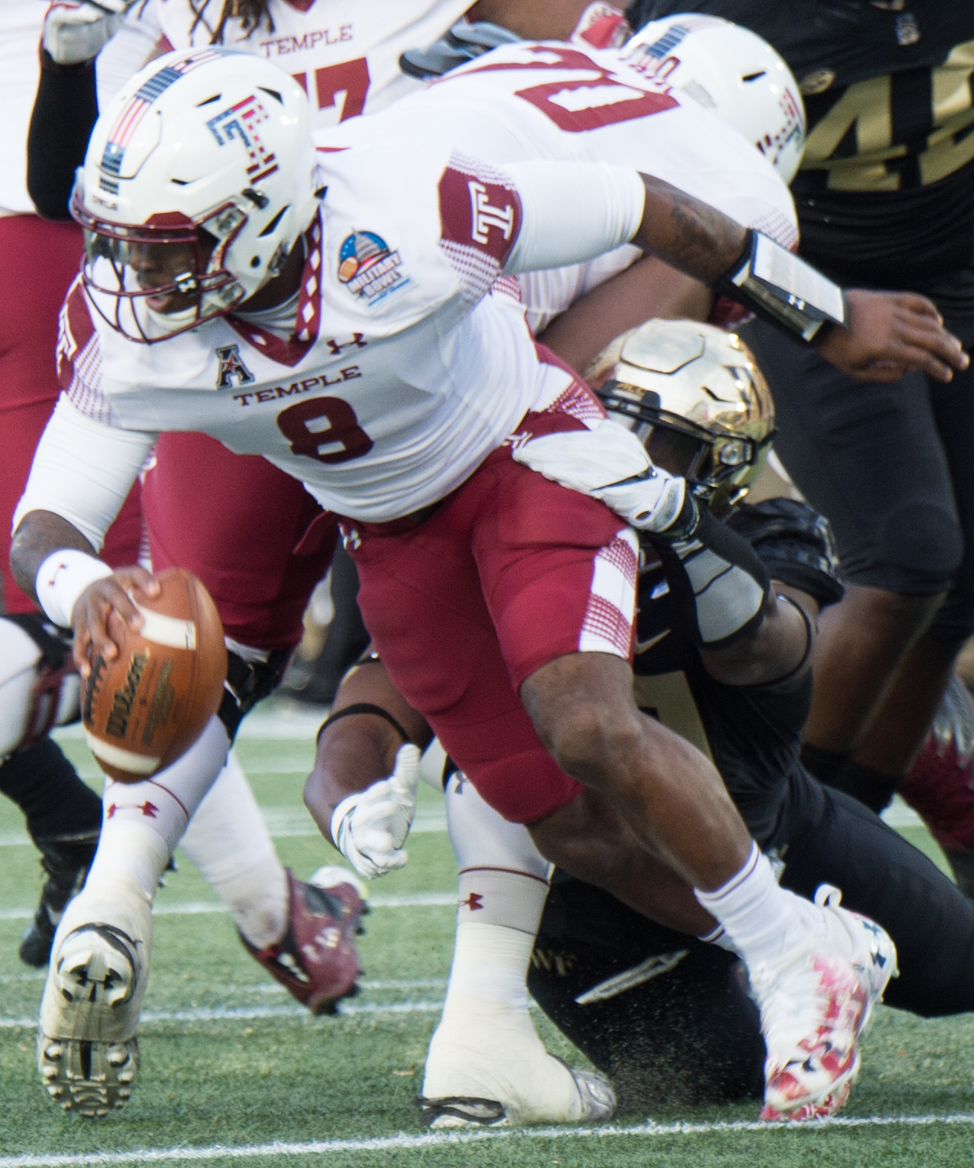
Walker (#8) with Temple in 2016

Walker's final year at Temple was a record-setting season for the senior. In the season opener against Army, Walker became Temple's all-time passing yards leader (10,273 yards). Walker would again lead the Owls to a bowl game at the end of the season, following a 10–4 overall record (8–0 in conference); Walker and the Owls would lose the Military Bowl 26–34 against Wake Forest. Additionally, Walker would receive numerous honors, accolades and watch-list nominations in the 2016 season, including American Athletic Conference Championship Game Most Outstanding Player, CFPA National Player of the Year Watch List, Davey O'Brien Award Watch List, as well as multiple preseason and conference recognitions.

Walker is the Owls all-time leader in wins by a starting quarterback (28), passing yards, passing touchdowns, completions, attempts, total yards and total touchdowns. Walker led the Owls to their first conference title in 49 years (2016) and their first ever back-to-back bowl appearances in school history (2015 and 2016).

== Professional career ==
Pre-draft measurables
Height	Weight	Arm length	Hand span	Wingspan	40-yard dash	10-yard split	20-yard split	20-yard shuttle	Three-cone drill	Vertical jump	Broad jump
5 ft 11 1/4 in (1.81 m)	214 lb (97 kg)	31 3/8 in (0.80 m)	9 1/8 in (0.23 m)	6 ft 3 1/2 in (1.92 m)	4.74 s	1.56 s	2.72 s	4.40 s	6.90 s	29.5 in (0.75 m)	9 ft 3 in (2.82 m)
All values from Temple Pro Day

=== Indianapolis Colts ===
On May 3, 2017, Walker was signed by the Indianapolis Colts as an undrafted free agent. He was waived on September 2, and was re-signed to the Colts' practice squad the following day. He signed a reserve/future contract with the Colts on January 1, 2018. On September 1, Walker was waived by the Colts and was re-signed to the practice squad the next day. He spent time on and off the Colts practice squad before being released on December 26, but was again re-signed three days later.

Walker signed a reserve/future contract with Indianapolis on January 13, 2019. On August 31, Walker was waived and re-signed to the practice squad the next day, only to be released two days later.

=== Houston Roughnecks ===
In October 2019, Walker was drafted by the newly-formed XFL for the 2020 season. The Pittsburgh Steelers called the XFL office to ask if they could sign Walker in October 2019, but was blocked as he was already under contract with the league. He was then allocated to the Houston Roughnecks prior to the 2020 XFL draft.

In the Roughnecks' first game against the Los Angeles Wildcats, Walker tossed four touchdowns, helping the team win a 37–17 victory. He was named the league's first ever Star of the Week for his performance.

Walker's final game of the 2020 campaign was marked by some controversy after, while his team was leading the Seattle Dragons 32–23, he mistakenly kneeled on fourth down at his own 21-yard-line with three seconds remaining on the clock – officials either failed to notice or refused to deal with Walker's palpable timing error and declared the game over, thus depriving Seattle the opportunity to score a touchdown and potential three-point conversion to tie the game. The league later admitted it was a mistake, but declared that the result would stand.

On March 20, 2020, the season was canceled due to the COVID-19 pandemic. Walker finished the 2020 season with a 5–0 record, 1,338 passing yards and 15 touchdowns with four interceptions. He led the league in both passing touchdowns and passing yards. He was placed on the reserve/other league list after signing with the Carolina Panthers in March, which was later terminated after the league had fully suspended operations on April 10.

=== Carolina Panthers ===
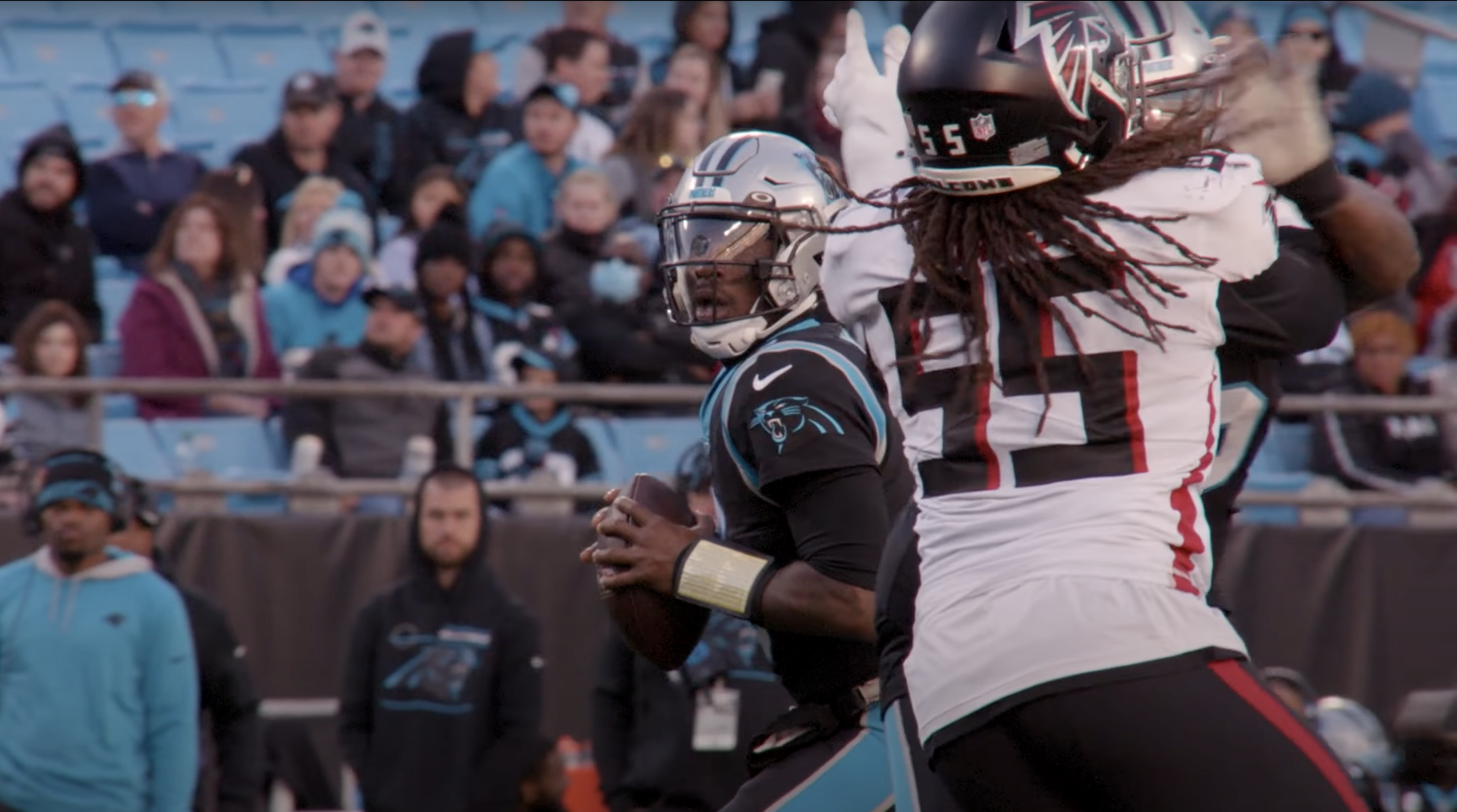
Walker playing the Atlanta Falcons in 2021

On March 25, 2020, Walker signed a two-year contract with the Panthers worth up to $1.5 million, reuniting him with former Temple head coach Matt Rhule. On October 29, Walker came in for the Panthers during the third quarter against the Atlanta Falcons after an injury to Teddy Bridgewater. When playing, Walker only threw one pass completion for three yards to Robby Anderson in his four pass attempts and was benched once Bridgewater was ready to play again. After Bridgewater injured his right knee in the fourth quarter of the Panthers' Week 10 game against the Tampa Bay Buccaneers, Walker finished the game, throwing for two completions and 12 yards. With Bridgewater remaining injured, Walker made his first NFL start the following week against the Detroit Lions, throwing for 258 yards, one touchdown, and two interceptions in a 20–0 win.

On January 10, 2022, Walker re-signed with the Panthers. Walker began to get playing time following Baker Mayfield's injury in Week 5 against the San Francisco 49ers. In Week 7, Walker threw for 177 yards and two touchdowns in a 21–3 win over the Tampa Bay Buccaneers.

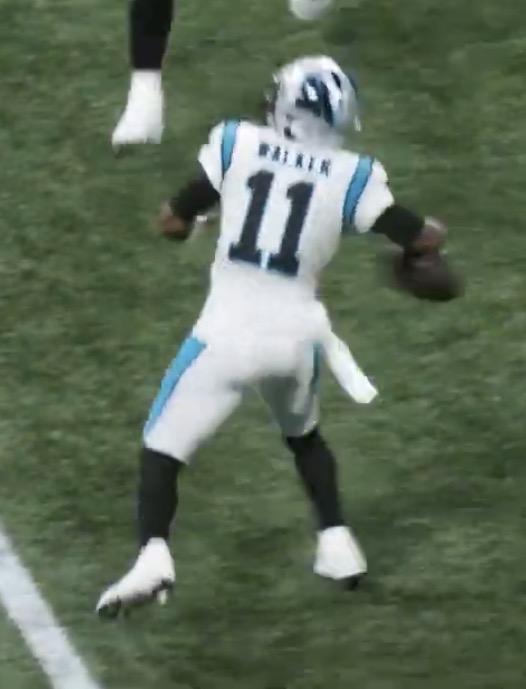
Walker's pass to D. J. Moore

In the team's Week 8 game against the Atlanta Falcons, Walker completed a 64-yard touchdown pass to receiver D. J. Moore that would have essentially sealed the game for Carolina. However, due to Moore taking his helmet off and drawing a flag, the game went into overtime after kicker Eddy Piñeiro missed the extra point, although it was later determined that no flag should have been thrown because Moore was already off the field. The NFL's Senior Vice President of Officiating Administration, Perry Fewell, defended the call in interviews, noting that at least two other Panther players removed their helmets while still on the field. Debate on the call only intensified, with public discussion shifting to whether or not "in the field" includes the end zone or not, furthermore pointing out that Moore's number was the only one attributed with the penalty. The NFL Rulebook has since been updated: "...by a player in the field of play or the end zone." The Panthers would go on to lose the game 37–34 in overtime.

=== Chicago Bears ===
On March 16, 2023, Walker signed a two-year contract with the Chicago Bears. On August 27, he was released by the team.

=== Cleveland Browns ===
On August 30, 2023, Walker was signed to the Cleveland Browns' practice squad. He was elevated to the active roster on September 30 ahead of the Browns Week 4 game against the Baltimore Ravens. Walker was again elevated to the active roster and named the starter for the Browns' Week 6 game against the San Francisco 49ers following an injury to Deshaun Watson and a poor game by Dorian Thompson-Robinson. In his first start, Walker led the Browns to victory over San Francisco with a final score of 19–17. In Week 7, Walker entered the game again due to an injury to Watson, throwing for 178 yards and leading the Browns to a 39–38 last-minute win over the Indianapolis Colts. On October 25, the Browns signed him to their active roster. Walker started the Week 8 game against the Seattle Seahawks, completing 15-of-31 passes (48.4%) for 248 yards, one touchdown, and two interceptions in a 24–20 loss. He was waived by the Browns on December 9, and re-signed to the practice squad four days later. On December 26, Walker was signed to the active roster again.

=== Seattle Seahawks ===
On June 10, 2024, Walker signed with the Seattle Seahawks. He was released by the Seahawks on August 27.

=== Calgary Stampeders ===
On October 8, 2024, Walker was signed to the practice roster of the Calgary Stampeders of the Canadian Football League. He was released on October 27, one day after the end of the regular season. He was later re-signed on November 11. Walker dressed in 13 games, starting one, in 2025 as the backup to Vernon Adams. Walker's lone start was a 31–11 loss to the Ottawa Redblacks. He changed his jersey number from 2 to 11 in the following offseason.

On April 30, 2026, Walker announced his retirement from professional football.

== Career statistics ==
Legend
	Led the league
**Bold**	League career high

=== XFL ===
Year	Team	Games			Passing									Rushing					Sacked	
Year	Team	GP	GS	Record	Cmp	Att	Pct	Yds	Y/A	Lng	TD	Int	Rtg	Att	Yds	Y/A	Lng	TD	Sck	Yds
2020	HOU	5	5	5–0	119	184	65.0	1,338	7.3	84	15	4	104.4	24	99	4.1	28	1	6	39

=== NFL ===
Year	Team	Games			Passing									Rushing					Sacked		Fumbles	
Year	Team	GP	GS	Record	Cmp	Att	Pct	Yds	Y/A	Lng	TD	Int	Rtg	Att	Yds	Y/A	Lng	TD	Sck	Yds	Fum	Lost
2017	IND	Did not play																				
2018	IND	Did not play																				
2019	IND	Did not play																				
2020	CAR	4	1	1–0	32	56	57.1	368	6.6	52	1	**5**	45.8	5	−2	−0.4	2	0	4	31	1	0
2021	CAR	5	1	1–0	36	66	54.5	362	5.5	24	1	3	56.5	7	13	1.9	13	0	7	47	3	1
2022	CAR	**6**	**5**	**2–3**	**63**	106	**59.4**	**731**	**6.9**	**62**	**3**	3	**78.0**	6	**39**	**6.5**	**20**	0	7	46	0	0
2023	CLE	**6**	2	1–1	54	**111**	48.6	674	6.1	58	1	**5**	52.2	**13**	30	2.3	9	0	**11**	**90**	**4**	**2**
Career		21	9	5–4	185	339	54.6	2,135	6.3	62	6	16	60.0	31	80	2.6	20	0	29	214	8	3

=== CFL ===
Year	Team	Games			Passing									Rushing					Sacked	
Year	Team	GD	GS	Record	Cmp	Att	Pct	Yds	Y/A	Lng	TD	Int	Rtg	Att	Yds	Y/A	Lng	TD	Sck	Yds
2025	CGY	13	1	0–1	35	59	59.3	395	6.7	33	2	4	62.5	7	32	4.6	16	1	1	8

=== College ===
Season	Team	Passing								Rushing			
Season	Team	Cmp	Att	Pct	Yds	Y/A	TD	Int	Rtg	Att	Yds	Avg	TD
2013	Temple	152	250	**60.8**	2,084	**8.3**	20	8	**150.8**	90	**332**	**3.7**	**3**
2014	Temple	203	381	53.3	2,317	6.1	13	**15**	107.8	**106**	324	3.1	**3**
2015	Temple	**245**	**432**	56.7	2,972	6.9	19	8	125.3	80	215	2.7	2
2016	Temple	230	395	58.2	**3,295**	**8.3**	**22**	13	140.1	65	−100	−1.5	1
Career		830	1,458	56.9	10,668	7.3	74	44	129.1	341	771	2.3	9
