= Dustin Hopkins =

American football player (born 1990)

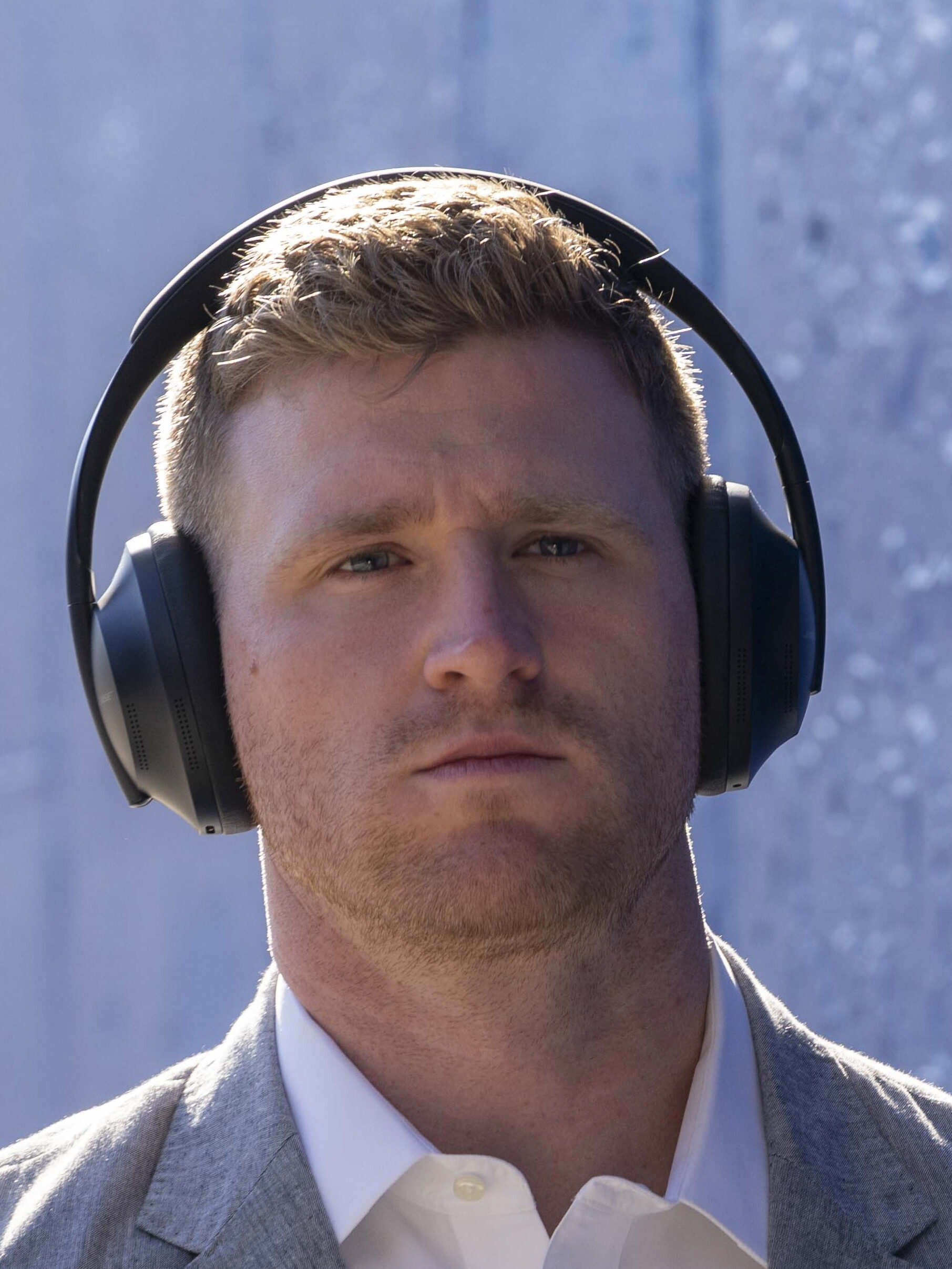
- Hopkins in 2021

Profile
- Position: Placekicker

Personal information
- Born: October 1, 1990 (age 36); Austin, Texas, U.S.
- Listed height: 6 ft 2 in (1.88 m)
- Listed weight: 210 lb (95 kg)

Career information
- High school: Clear Lake (Houston, Texas)
- College: Florida State (2009–2012)
- NFL draft: 2013: 6th round, 177th overall pick

Career history
- Buffalo Bills (2013); New Orleans Saints (2014–2015)*; Washington Redskins / Football Team (2015–2021); Los Angeles Chargers (2021–2022); Cleveland Browns (2023–2024)
- * Offseason or practice squad member only

Awards and highlights
- First-team All-American (2012); 2× First-team All-ACC (2011, 2012)

Career NFL statistics as of 2024
- Field goals made: 241
- Field goals attempted: 287
- Field goal %: 84.0
- Longest field goal: 58
- Touchbacks: 489
- Stats at Pro Football Reference

Dustin Cole Hopkins (born October 1, 1990) is an American professional football placekicker. He played college football for the Florida State Seminoles and was selected by the Buffalo Bills in the sixth round of the 2013 NFL draft.

== College career ==
Hopkins was recruited by Florida State when then Seminoles special teams coordinator Jody Allen watched high school game film of Hopkins's kickoffs. Interest was also shown by Notre Dame. As a freshman in 2009, Hopkins hit 19 of 27 field goals, or approximately 70%, over the course of 2009. On November 13, 2010, against Clemson, Florida State, who was trailing the entire game, made a comeback in the 4th quarter. With less than a minute left in regulation, tied at 13, Florida State marched down into Clemson territory, where, with 3 seconds left, Hopkins made a 55-yard field goal to win the game.

In 2011, while playing against Wake Forest, Hopkins kicked his 109th point after touchdown (PAT) in a row, breaking the previous FSU record. He would not miss a PAT until September 8, 2012, leaving him at 145 successful attempts, the sixth longest streak in NCAA history. On November 18, 2012, Hopkins set the Football Bowl Subdivision record for career points scored by a kicker at 442 points with a 26-yard field goal in the second quarter versus the Maryland Terrapins. Hopkins would finish the day with six more points upping the record to 448 points. His record for most career field goals was later broken in 2016 by Arizona State University kicker Zane Gonzalez.

== Professional career ==
Pre-draft measurables
Height	Weight	Arm length	Hand span	Wingspan	40-yard dash	10-yard split	20-yard split	Vertical jump	Broad jump
6 ft 2 in (1.88 m)	193 lb (88 kg)	31 3/4 in (0.81 m)	8 7/8 in (0.23 m)	6 ft 3 1/4 in (1.91 m)	4.74 s	1.67 s	2.79 s	33.5 in (0.85 m)	9 ft 8 in (2.95 m)
All values from NFL Combine

=== Buffalo Bills ===
Hopkins was selected by the Buffalo Bills in the sixth round with the 177th overall pick in the 2013 NFL draft, joining punter Shawn Powell and quarterback EJ Manuel, his former teammates at Florida State.

On May 10, 2013, Hopkins signed a four-year contract with the Bills.

On August 19, 2013, Hopkins was named the starting placekicker over veteran Rian Lindell. On September 2, 2013, Hopkins was revealed to have sustained a groin injury. This prompted the Bills to sign Dan Carpenter. Due to a slow recovery from that injury and the need to further open roster spots, Hopkins was placed on injured reserve following Week 5.

Hopkins was given a chance to earn back his roster spot during the 2014 season, but lost the kicking competition to Carpenter; the Bills released Hopkins on August 25, 2014.

=== New Orleans Saints ===
Hopkins was signed to the New Orleans Saints practice squad on December 17, 2014. He was then signed to a future/reserve contract at the end of the 2014 season and competed for placekicking duties with Shayne Graham.

On September 5, 2015, the Saints announced they had released Hopkins after losing the competition to Zach Hocker.

=== Washington Redskins / Football Team ===
==== 2015 season ====
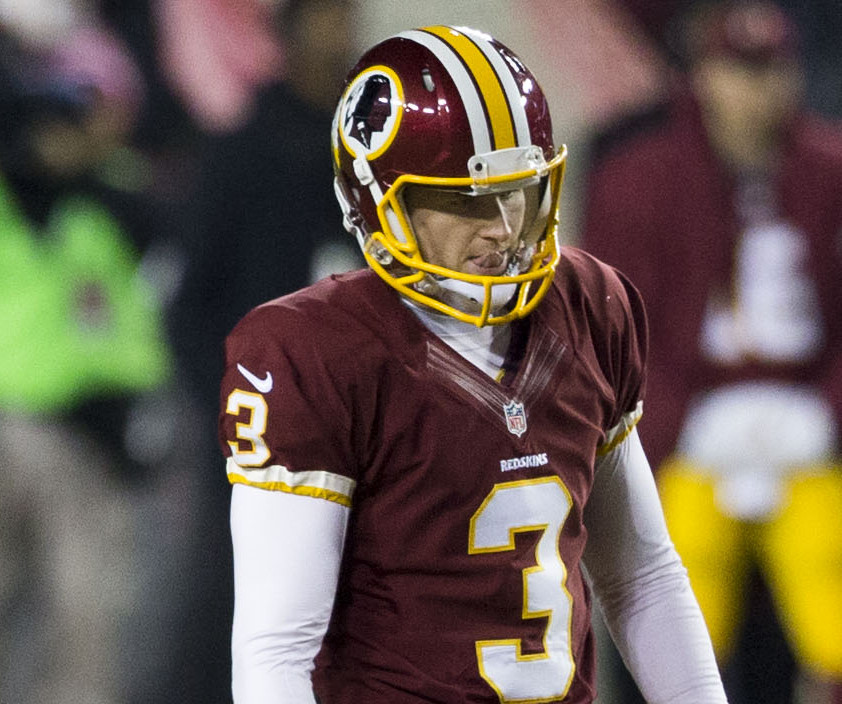
Hopkins in 2015

Hopkins was signed by the Washington Redskins on September 14, 2015, after they had released Kai Forbath. On November 15, 2015, Hopkins kicked a career-high four field goals against the New Orleans Saints.

==== 2016 season ====
On October 30, 2016, Hopkins missed a potential game winner in the late stages of overtime which would eventually end in a 27–27 tie against the Cincinnati Bengals. During the 2016 season, Hopkins set a franchise record with 34 field goals made.

==== 2017 season ====
On October 15, 2017, Hopkins suffered a partially torn hip muscle during a game against the San Francisco 49ers, and was placed on injured reserve days later. He was activated back to the 53-man roster on December 16, 2017.

==== 2018 season ====
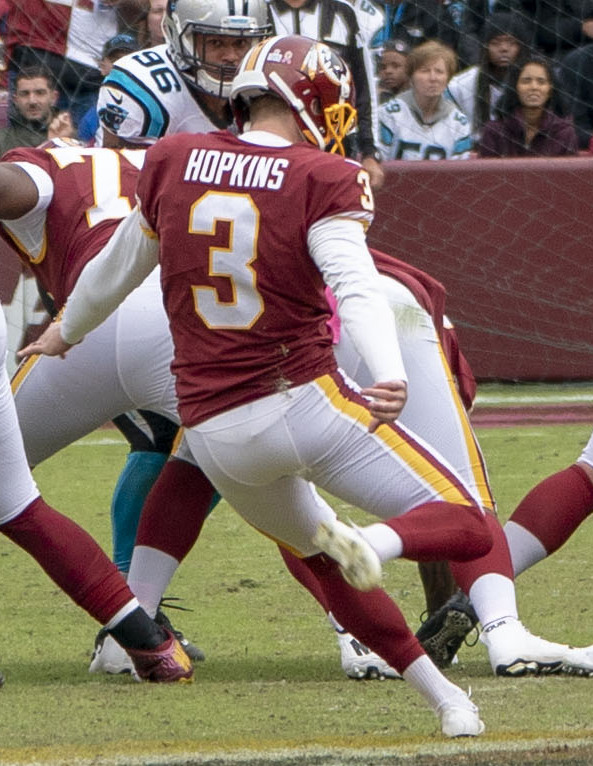
Hopkins with the Washington Redskins in 2018

On March 12, 2018, Hopkins signed a three-year contract extension with the Redskins. On October 14, 2018, Hopkins kicked a career-long 56-yard field goal against the Carolina Panthers. In the 2018 season, Hopkins converted 25 of 26 extra point attempts and 26 of 29 field goal attempts.

==== 2019 season ====
In the 2019 season, Hopkins converted 21 of 22 extra point attempts and 25 of 30 field goal attempts.

==== 2020 season ====
In Week 6 of the 2020 season, Hopkins missed a 47-yard field goal attempt against the New York Giants. The Giants would win the game with the final score being 20-19 with Head Coach Ron Rivera choosing a two-point attempt instead of sending Hopkins to attempt the extra point and potentially bringing the game to overtime. The next week, Hopkins would miss a 44-yard field goal in the win over the Dallas Cowboys. In the Week 10 loss to the Detroit Lions, Hopkins missed another field goal attempt at 43 yards with the final score of the game at 27–30. After the game when asked if he was considering bringing in another kicker, Head Coach Ron Rivera stated “Well, it is something that we are talking about and discussing.”

In Week 13 against the Pittsburgh Steelers, Hopkins was a perfect 3 for 3 on his field goal attempts and 2 for 2 on his extra point attempts during the 23–17 win. This was the Steelers’ first loss of the season. Hopkins was named the NFC Special Teams Player of the Week for his performance in Week 13. He finished the 2020 season converting 30 of 32 extra point attempts and 27 of 34 field goal attempts. He re-signed with the team in March 2021.

==== 2021 season ====
On September 16, 2021, against the New York Giants, Hopkins kicked a game-winning field goal at the climax of the game as Washington won 30–29. At first, Hopkins missed, but the Giants defense committed an offside penalty, giving him a second chance, which succeeded.

In Week 3 of the 2021 season against the Buffalo Bills, Hopkins recovered his own kickoff after the Bills failed to receive the kick, resulting in his first career fumble recovery. Hopkins was released by the team on October 20, 2021.

=== Los Angeles Chargers ===
On October 26, 2021, Hopkins signed with the Los Angeles Chargers. In the 2021 season, with two teams, he converted 40 of 44 extra point attempts and 30 of 34 field goal attempts.

On March 14, 2022, Hopkins signed a three-year contract extension with the Chargers.

In Week 6 of the 2022 season against the Denver Broncos, Hopkins injured his hamstring but still went 4-4 on field goals, including the game-winner in overtime. For this performance, Hopkins was named the American Football Conference (AFC) Special Teams Player of the Week. He missed the next four games with the injury before being placed on injured reserve on November 22, 2022. In his five appearances, he converted all 12 extra points and nine of ten field goal attempts.

=== Cleveland Browns ===
On August 28, 2023, the Chargers traded Hopkins to the Cleveland Browns for a 2025 seventh-round pick after he lost his starting job to Cameron Dicker. Hopkins took over for the Browns 124th pick in 2022, Cade York, who was waived following preseason struggles. Hopkins was named AFC Special Teams Player of the week on October 18, 2023, for kicking four field goals and an extra point in the Week 6 defeat of the 49ers. On October 25, Hopkins was again named AFC Special Teams Player of the Week for the second consecutive week after his performance in the team's win against the Indianapolis Colts. Hopkins was 4/4 on field goal attempts and 3/3 on extra point attempts. 3/4 of Hopkins's field goals were from 53+ with one being a new career long of 58 yards. Hopkins set a new Browns single season record of 31 made field goals after kicking a 55-yard field goal against the Jacksonville Jaguars on December 10, 2023. In that same game, Hopkins also set a new NFL record for five consecutive games with a field goal of 50 yards or more.

On December 24, 2023, Hopkins injured his hamstring while attempting to tackle Dameon Pierce on a 98-yard kick return during the Browns’ 36–22 win over the Houston Texans. He would not return to the game and former Lions placekicker Riley Patterson would be signed to the Browns’ practice squad the following day. He finished the 2023 season converting 24 of 26 extra point attempts and 33 of 36 field goal attempts.

On July 15, 2024, Hopkins signed a three-year contract extension with the Browns. He finished the 2024 season converting 17 of 20 extra point attempts and 18 of 27 field goal attempts.

On August 26, 2025, Hopkins was released by the Browns as part of final roster cuts.

== Personal life ==
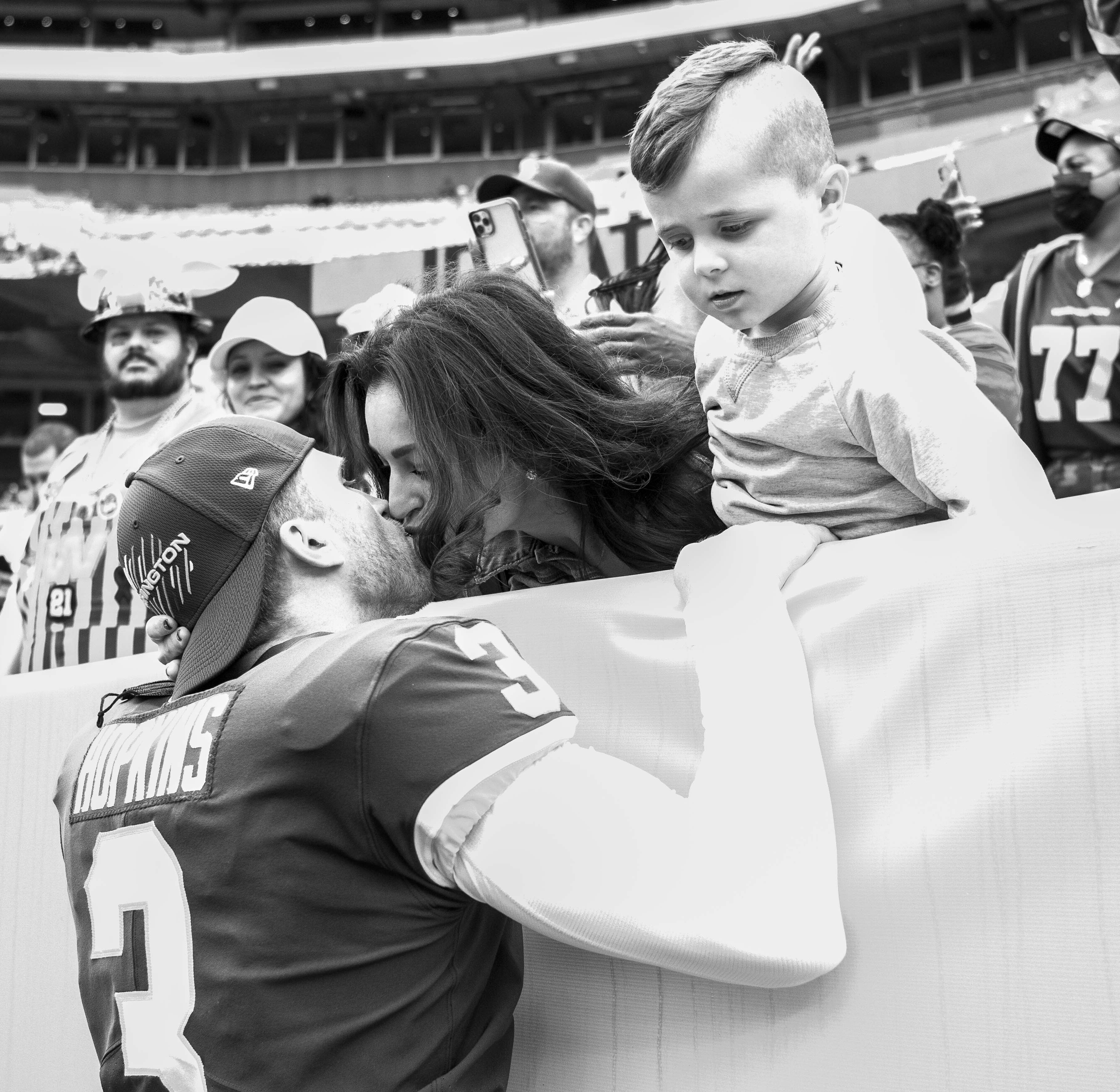
Hopkins with his wife and his son in 2021

Hopkins is a Christian. He is married to Gabrielle Hopkins. They have two sons together, Wake and Wiley. He went to Space Center Intermediate School and Clear Lake High School in Clear lake.

== NFL career statistics ==
Legend
	Led the league
**Bold**	Career high

=== Regular season ===
Year	Team	GP	Field goals				Extra points			Points
Year	Team	GP	FGA	FGM	Lng	Pct	XPA	XPM	Pct	Points
2013	BUF	0	Did not play due to injury							
2015	WAS	15	28	25	54	89.3	**40**	**39**	97.5	114
2016	WAS	16	**42**	**34**	53	81.0	39	36	92.3	**138**
2017	WAS	8	17	14	49	82.4	19	18	94.7	60
2018	WAS	16	29	26	56	89.7	26	25	96.2	103
2019	WAS	16	30	25	53	83.3	22	21	95.5	96
2020	WAS	16	34	27	51	79.4	32	30	93.8	111
2021	WAS	6	14	12	50	85.7	12	10	83.3	46
2021	LAC	11	20	18	50	90.0	32	30	93.8	84
2022	LAC	5	10	9	43	90.0	12	12	**100.0**	39
2023	CLE	15	36	33	**58**	**91.7**	26	24	92.3	123
2024	CLE	16	27	18	56	66.6	20	17	85.0	71
Career		140	287	241	58	83.9	280	262	93.5	985

=== Postseason ===
Year	Team	GP	Field goals				Extra points			Points
Year	Team	GP	FGA	FGM	Lng	Pct	XPA	XPM	Pct	Points
2015	WAS	**1**	**1**	**1**	25	**100.0**	**2**	1	50.0	4
2020	WAS	**1**	**1**	**1**	**36**	**100.0**	**2**	**2**	**100.0**	**5**
2022	LAC	0	0	Did not play due to injury						
2023	CLE	0	0	Did not play due to injury						
Career		2	2	2	36	100.0	4	3	75.0	9
