= Mohamoud Diabate =

American football player (born 2001)

No. 44 – Tennessee Titans
- Position: Linebacker
- Roster status: Active

Personal information
- Born: May 18, 2001 (age 25); Auburn, Alabama, U.S.
- Listed height: 6 ft 4 in (1.93 m)
- Listed weight: 235 lb (107 kg)

Career information
- High school: Auburn
- College: Florida (2018–2021); Utah (2022)
- NFL draft: 2023: undrafted

Career history
- Cleveland Browns (2023–2025); Tennessee Titans (2026)*; Carolina Panthers (2026)*; Tennessee Titans (2026–present)
- * Offseason or practice squad member only

Career NFL statistics as of Week 10, 2026
- Total tackles: 132
- Forced fumbles: 1
- Fumble recoveries: 2
- Pass deflections: 3
- Stats at Pro Football Reference

Mohamoud Diabate (born May 18, 2001) is an American professional football linebacker for the Tennessee Titans of the National Football League (NFL). He played college football for the Florida Gators before transferring to the Utah Utes and was signed as an undrafted free agent by the Cleveland Browns after the 2023 NFL draft.

== Early life ==
Diabate grew up in Auburn, Alabama and attended Auburn High School. He committed to the Florida Gators on August 22, 2018.

== College career ==
Diabate played at Florida for three years before deciding to transfer to Utah for the 2022 season. In his collegiate career he totaled 228 tackles, 24 going for a loss, 10.5 sacks, an interception, 2 pass deflections and 4 forced fumbles. His best season was with Utah in 2022, when he posted 58 tackles (13.5 being for a loss), 5 sacks, 1 pass deflection, and 1 forced fumble.

Diabate was projected to be 6th to 7th-round pick in the 2023 NFL draft.

== Professional career ==
Pre-draft measurables
Height	Weight	Arm length	Hand span	Wingspan	40-yard dash	10-yard split	20-yard split	20-yard shuttle	Three-cone drill	Vertical jump	Broad jump	Bench press
6 ft 3 1/2 in (1.92 m)	225 lb (102 kg)	32 1/2 in (0.83 m)	9 3/4 in (0.25 m)	6 ft 8 in (2.03 m)	4.52 s	1.64 s	2.66 s	4.25 s	6.96 s	34.0 in (0.86 m)	11 ft 0 in (3.35 m)	20 reps
All values from Pro Day

=== Cleveland Browns ===
After not being selected in the 2023 NFL draft, Diabate signed with the Cleveland Browns as an undrafted free agent on May 12, 2023. On August 29, the Browns announced that he had made the team's initial 53-man roster.

Diabate suffered a hip injury in Week 1 of the 2024 season and was placed on injured reserve on September 11, 2024. He was activated on October 12.

=== Tennessee Titans ===
On March 23, 2026, Diabate signed with the Tennessee Titans. He was waived by the Titans on August 31. On September 2, Tennessee re–signed Diabate to their practice squad. On October 29, he was released.

=== Carolina Panthers ===
On November 2, 2026, Diabate was signed to the Carolina Panthers practice squad.

=== Tennessee Titans (second stint) ===
On November 11, 2026, Diabate was signed by the Titans off the Panthers practice squad.

== NFL career statistics ==
Legend
**Bold**	Career high

=== Regular season ===
Year	Team	Games		Tackles					Interceptions						Fumbles				
Year	Team	GP	GS	Cmb	Solo	Ast	Sck	TFL	Int	Yds	Avg	Lng	TD	PD	FF	Fum	FR	Yds	TD
2023	CLE	16	1	8	3	5	0.0	0	0	0	0.0	0	0	0	0	0	**1**	0	0
2024	CLE	13	11	**70**	**35**	**35**	0.0	**5**	0	0	0.0	0	0	**3**	0	0	0	0	0
2025	CLE	17	6	49	22	27	0.0	3	0	0	0.0	0	0	0	**1**	0	**1**	0	0
2026	TEN	2	0	5	0	5	0.0	0	0	0	0.0	0	0	0	0	0	0	0	0
Career		48	18	132	60	72	0.0	8	0	0	0.0	0	0	3	1	0	2	0	0

=== Postseason ===
Year	Team	Games		Tackles					Interceptions						Fumbles				
Year	Team	GP	GS	Cmb	Solo	Ast	Sck	TFL	Int	Yds	Avg	Lng	TD	PD	FF	Fum	FR	Yds	TD
2023	CLE	1	0	0	0	0	0.0	0	0	0	0.0	0	0	0	0	0	0	0	0
Career		1	0	0	0	0	0.0	0	0	0	0.0	0	0	0	0	0	0	0	0
