= 2023 Cleveland Browns season =

75th season in franchise history

- Owner: Jimmy Haslam
- General manager: Andrew Berry
- Head coach: Kevin Stefanski
- Offensive coordinator: Alex Van Pelt
- Defensive coordinator: Jim Schwartz
- Home stadium: Cleveland Browns Stadium

Results
- Record: 11–6
- Division place: 2nd AFC North
- Playoffs: Lost Wild Card Playoffs (at Texans) 14–45
- All-Pros: DE Myles Garrett (1st team)
- Pro Bowlers: 7: WR Amari Cooper; TE David Njoku; G Joel Bitonio; G Wyatt Teller; DE Myles Garrett; OLB Jeremiah Owusu-Koramoah; CB Denzel Ward

Uniform
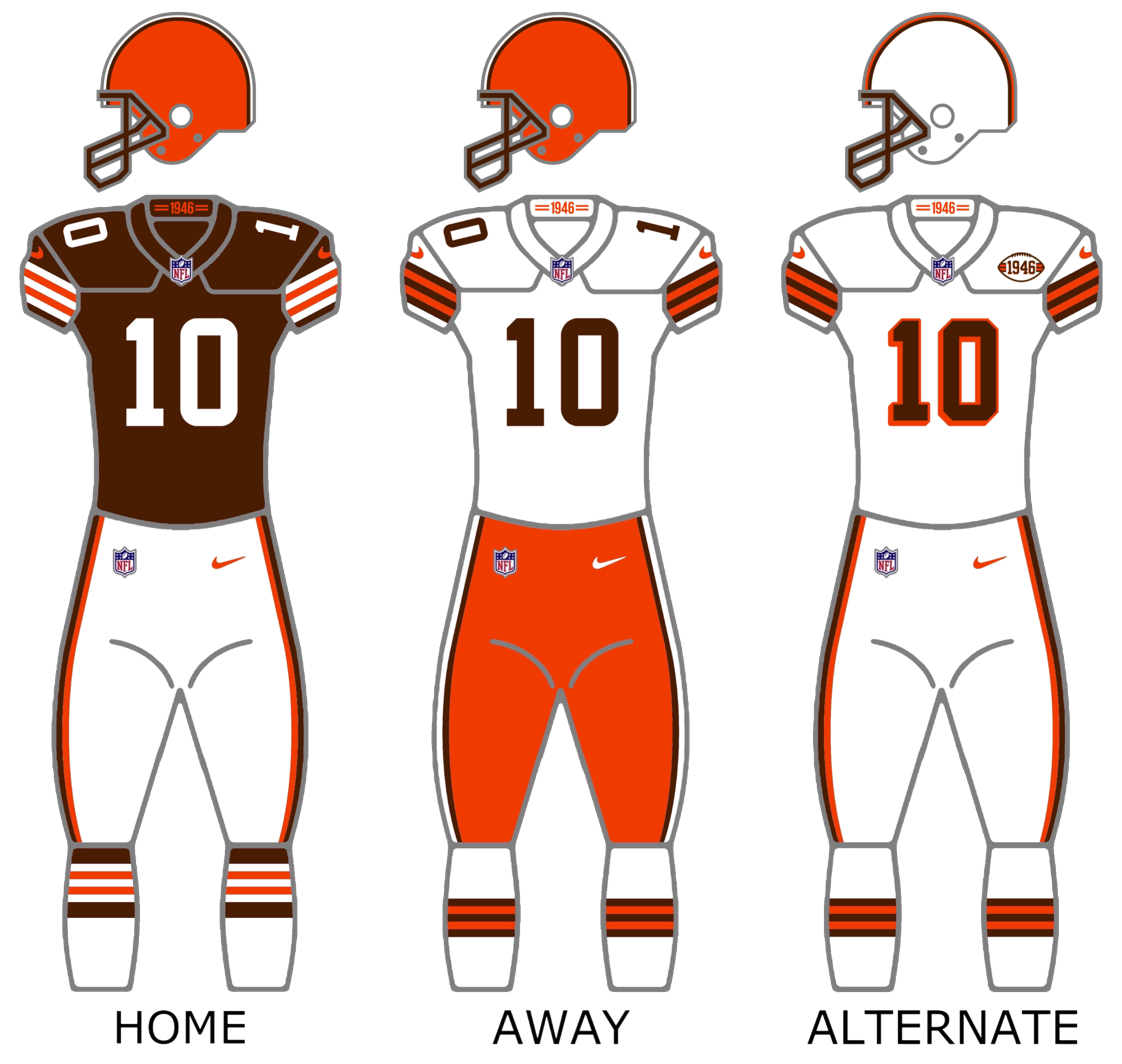

The 2023 season was the Cleveland Browns' 71st season as a member of the National Football League (NFL), their 75th overall, and their fourth under the head coach/general manager tandem of Kevin Stefanski and Andrew Berry. They improved upon their 7–10 record from the previous season, finishing with an 11–6 record and clinching their first winning season and playoff berth since 2020.

In the season, the Browns started five different quarterbacks: Deshaun Watson, Dorian Thompson-Robinson, P. J. Walker, Joe Flacco, and Jeff Driskel. This marked the most starting quarterbacks in a season in franchise history and the most by any team since the 1987 New England Patriots. Although the Browns advanced to the playoffs, they were blown out by the Houston Texans in the Wild Card Round, 45–14. Flacco, who did not have a team for eleven weeks, won the Associated Press Comeback Player of the Year award for clinching their spot in the playoffs and winning four of his five starts.

The Cleveland Browns drew an average home attendance of 67,810 in 9 home games in the 2023 NFL season, the 19th highest in the league.

== Offseason ==
=== Staff changes ===
On January 9, the day after the 2022 season finale, the Browns fired defensive coordinator Joe Woods after three seasons.

On January 18, the team hired former Tennessee Titans senior defensive assistant Jim Schwartz to replace Woods as defensive coordinator. Schwartz previously served as head coach of the Detroit Lions and defensive coordinator for the Titans and the Philadelphia Eagles, winning Super Bowl LII during his tenure with the latter.

On February 21, the Browns fired special teams coordinator Mike Priefer after four seasons. He had served as interim head coach for two games, including the Browns' playoff victory over the Pittsburgh Steelers in 2020.

On February 25, the Browns hired former Indianapolis Colts special teams coordinator Bubba Ventrone to the same position, as well as to serve as assistant head coach. Ventrone played ten seasons as a safety and special teams specialist, including four seasons with the Browns.

=== Roster changes ===
==== Free agents ====
2023 Cleveland Browns Free Agents
Pos.	Player	2023 team	Date
QB	Jacoby Brissett	Washington Commanders	March 16
TE	Pharaoh Brown	Indianapolis Colts	April 10
DT	Taven Bryan	Indianapolis Colts	March 17
LB	Jermaine Carter	Houston Texans	May 8
DE	Jadeveon Clowney	Baltimore Ravens	August 18
LB	Tae Davis	Atlanta Falcons	March 17
G	Hjalte Froholdt	Arizona Cardinals	March 15
S	Ronnie Harrison	Indianapolis Colts	August 14
OT	Chris Hubbard	Tennessee Titans	July 28
RB	Kareem Hunt	Cleveland Browns	September 20
TE	Jesse James	New Orleans Saints	May 31
RB	D'Ernest Johnson	Jacksonville Jaguars	March 23
LB	Deion Jones	Carolina Panthers	July 31
LB	Jordan Kunaszyk	Cleveland Browns	March 20
C	Ethan Pocic	Cleveland Browns	March 15
LB	Reggie Ragland		
LB	Sione Takitaki	Cleveland Browns	March 16
LB	Anthony Walker Jr.	Cleveland Browns	March 29
DE	Stephen Weatherly		
CB	Greedy Williams	Philadelphia Eagles	March 16
DE	Chase Winovich	Houston Texans	March 17

==== Signings ====
2023 Cleveland Browns Signings
Pos.	Player	2022 team	Date
LB	Matthew Adams	Chicago Bears	March 21
TE	Jordan Akins	Houston Texans	March 18
CB	Lorenzo Burns	Birmingham Stallions (USFL)	August 1
QB	Joshua Dobbs	Tennessee Titans	March 20
CB	Mike Ford	Atlanta Falcons	March 21
WR	Marquise Goodwin	Seattle Seahawks	April 14
DT	Trysten Hill	Arizona Cardinals	March 20
DT	Maurice Hurst Jr.	San Francisco 49ers	March 18
CB	BoPete Keyes	Baltimore Ravens	July 6
OG	Wes Martin	Washington Commanders	March 30
SS	Rodney McLeod	Indianapolis Colts	May 5
DE	Ogbonnia Okoronkwo	Houston Texans	March 15
S	Juan Thornhill	Kansas City Chiefs	March 15
DT	Dalvin Tomlinson	Minnesota Vikings	March 15
CB	Chris Westry	Carolina Panthers	May 16

==== Trades ====
2023 Cleveland Browns Trades
Date	Team	Player(s)/Asset(s) received	Player(s)/Asset(s) traded
March 22	New York Jets	WR Elijah Moore; 2023 3rd round selection	2023 2nd round selection
May 16	Minnesota Vikings	DE Za'Darius Smith; 2025 6th round selection 2025 7th round selection	2024 5th round selection 2025 5th round selection
August 24	Arizona Cardinals	2024 5th round selection	QB Joshua Dobbs; 2024 7th round selection
August 27	New England Patriots	RB Pierre Strong Jr.	T Tyrone Wheatley Jr.
August 28	Los Angeles Chargers	K Dustin Hopkins	2025 7th round selection

==== Draft ====
2023 Cleveland Browns draft selections
Round	Selection	Player	Position	College	Notes
1	12	Traded to the Houston Texans (Note: The Browns traded first- and third-round selections (12th and 73rd overall), 2022 first- and fourth-round selections (13th and 107th overall), and 2024 first- and fourth-round selections (23rd and 123rd overall) to the Houston Texans in exchange for QB Deshaun Watson and a 2024 sixth-round selection (203rd overall).)			
2	42	Traded to the New York Jets (Note: The Browns traded a second-round selection (42nd overall) to the New York Jets in exchange for a third-round selection (74th overall) and WR Elijah Moore.)			
3	73	Traded to the Houston Texans			
3	74	Cedric Tillman	WR	Tennessee	From Jets
3	98	Siaki Ika	DT	Baylor	2020 Resolution JC-2A selection (Note: The Browns received a third-round selection and a 2022 third-round selection as a result of the Minnesota Vikings hiring former Browns vice president of football operations Kwesi Adofo-Mensah as general manager.)
4	111	Dawand Jones	OT	Ohio State	
4	126	Isaiah McGuire	DE	Missouri	From Vikings (Note: The Browns traded a 2022 fourth-round selection (118th overall) to the Minnesota Vikings in exchange for a fourth-round selection (126th overall) and a 2022 fifth-round selection (156th overall).)
5	140	Dorian Thompson-Robinson	QB	UCLA	From Rams (Note: The Browns traded CB Troy Hill to the Los Angeles Rams in exchange for a fifth-round selection (140th overall).)
5	142	Cameron Mitchell	CB	Northwestern	
6	190	Luke Wypler	C	Ohio State	
7	229	Traded to the Baltimore Ravens (Note: The Browns traded a seventh-round selection (229th overall) to the Baltimore Ravens in exchange for a 2024 sixth-round selection.)			

2023 Cleveland Browns undrafted free agents
Name	Position	College	Ref.
Caleb Biggers	CB	Boise State	
Mohamoud Diabate	LB	Utah	
Thomas Greaney	TE	Albany	
Hassan Hall	RB	Georgia Tech	
Ronnie Hickman	S	Ohio State	
Jeremiah Martin	DE	Washington	
Tanner McCalister	S	Ohio State	
Lonnie Phelps	DE	Kansas	
Charlie Thomas	LB	Georgia Tech	

Draft trades

=== Uniform changes ===
On July 17, the Browns introduced a white helmet with an orange and brown center stripe. The helmet was worn during three games with the team's 1946 throwback uniforms, which were previously introduced in 2021. It will be worn for three games and mark the first time since 1951 that the Browns will wear a non-orange helmet.

== Staff ==
2023 Cleveland Browns staff
Front office: Owners – Jimmy Haslam, Dee Haslam, Whitney Haslam Johnson, J. W. Johnson; Chief strategy officer – Paul DePodesta; Executive vice president/COO – David Jenkins; Executive vice president of football operations/general manager – Andrew Berry; Assistant general manager/vice president of football operations – Catherine Raîche; Assistant general manager/vice president of player personnel – Glenn Cook; Vice president of football administration – Chris Cooper; Vice president of research and strategy – Andrew Healy; Vice president of player personnel process and development – Ken Kovash; Director of football administration – Taylor Young; Director of player personnel – Dan Saganey; Director of pro scouting – Adam Al-Khayyal; Director of college scouting – Max Paulus; Senior personnel/coaching executive – Bob Quinn; Senior executive advisor to the GM – Jimmy Raye III; Director of football operations – Tyler Hamblin; Director of research and strategy – Dave Giuliani; Director of scouting research – Mike Cetta; Director of football information systems – Brad DeAngelis; Head coaches: Head coach – Kevin Stefanski; Assistant head coach/special teams coordinator - Raymond Ventrone; Offensive coaches: Offensive coordinator – Alex Van Pelt; Senior offensive assistant – Bill Musgrave; Run game coordinator/running backs – Stump Mitchell; Pass game coordinator/wide receivers – Chad O'Shea; Assistant wide receivers – Callie Brownson; Tight ends – T. C. McCartney; Offensive line – Bill Callahan; Assistant offensive line – Scott Peters; Offensive assistant – Jonathan Decoster; Offensive assistant/quarterbacks – Ashton Grant; Bill Willis diversity coaching fellow – Nemo Washington	Defensive coaches: Defensive coordinator – Jim Schwartz; Defensive line – Ben Bloom; Assistant defensive line – Jordan Thomas; Linebackers – Jason Tarver; Cornerbacks – Brandon Lynch; Safeties – Ephraim Banda; Defensive assistant – Zach Dunn; Defensive quality control – Jeff Anderson; Special teams coaches: Assistant special teams – Stephen Bravo-Brown; Strength and conditioning: Director of high performance – Shaun Huls; Director of strength and conditioning – Larry Jackson; Assistant strength and conditioning/sports science – Josh Christovich; Assistant strength and conditioning – Monty Gibson; Assistant strength and conditioning – Dale Jones; Assistant strength and conditioning – Evan Marcus; Director of performance nutrition – Katy Meassick

== Final roster ==
2023 Cleveland Browns roster
Quarterbacks (QB): 12 Jeff Driskel; 15 Joe Flacco; 10 P. J. Walker; Running backs (RB): 34 Jerome Ford; 27 Kareem Hunt; 20 Pierre Strong Jr.; Wide receivers (WR): 18 David Bell; 2 Amari Cooper; 3 Marquise Goodwin; 8 Elijah Moore; 11 James Proche; 19 Cedric Tillman; Tight ends (TE): 84 Jordan Akins; 88 Harrison Bryant; 85 David Njoku	Offensive linemen (OL): 75 Joel Bitonio G; 64 Geron Christian T; 68 Michael Dunn G; 53 Nick Harris C; 66 James Hudson T; 55 Ethan Pocic C; 77 Wyatt Teller G; 69 Leroy Watson T; 56 Luke Wypler G/C; Defensive linemen (DL): 96 Jordan Elliott DT; 95 Myles Garrett DE; 93 Shelby Harris DT; 62 Siaki Ika DT; 92 Sam Kamara DE; 57 Isaiah McGuire DE; 54 Ogbo Okoronkwo DE; 99 Za'Darius Smith DE; 94 Dalvin Tomlinson DT; 91 Alex Wright DE	Linebackers (LB): 40 Matthew Adams MLB; 43 Mohamoud Diabate OLB; 42 Tony Fields II OLB; 51 Jordan Kunaszyk OLB; 28 Jeremiah Owusu-Koramoah OLB; 44 Sione Takitaki OLB/MLB; Defensive backs (DB): 37 D'Anthony Bell SS; 23 Martin Emerson CB; 28 Mike Ford CB; 25 Kahlef Hailassie CB; 30 Duron Harmon SS; 33 Ronnie Hickman FS; 29 Cameron Mitchell CB; 0 Greg Newsome II CB; 1 Juan Thornhill FS; 21 Denzel Ward CB; Special teams (ST): 13 Corey Bojorquez P; 7 Dustin Hopkins K; 47 Charley Hughlett LS	Practice squad: 39 Kalon Barnes CB; 16 Jaelon Darden WR; 31 Vincent Gray FS; 38 A. J. Green CB; 41 John Kelly RB; 74 Alex Leatherwood T; 48 Tanner McCalister SS; 83 Zaire Mitchell-Paden TE; 64 Justin Murray T; 72 Ty Nsekhe T (PS/I); 36 Riley Patterson K; 63 Lonnie Phelps DE; 76 Rodger Saffold G; 35 Charlie Thomas OLB; 58 Isaiah Thomas DE; 80 Austin Watkins WR; 98 Chris Williams DT; Reserve: 24 Nick Chubb RB (IR); 78 Jack Conklin T (IR); 52 Dawson Deaton C (IR); 22 Grant Delpit SS (IR); 70 Drew Forbes G (NF-Ill.); 9 Jakeem Grant WR (IR); 90 Maurice Hurst II DT (IR); 79 Dawand Jones T (IR); 26 Rodney McLeod FS (IR); 50 Jacob Phillips MLB (IR); 17 Dorian Thompson-Robinson QB (IR); 5 Anthony Walker MLB (IR); 4 Deshaun Watson QB (IR); -- Isaiah Weston WR (Retired); 71 Jedrick Wills T (IR); -- Michael Woods II WR (NF-Inj.); Rookies in italics 53 active, 16 reserve, 16 practice squad (1 exempt)

== Preseason ==
Week	Date	Opponent	Result	Record	Venue	Recap
HOF	August 3	New York Jets	W 21–16	1–0	Tom Benson Hall of Fame Stadium	Recap
1	August 11	Washington Commanders	L 15–17	1–1	Cleveland Browns Stadium	Recap
2	August 17	at Philadelphia Eagles	T 18–18	1–1–1	Lincoln Financial Field	Recap
3	August 26	at Kansas City Chiefs	L 32–33	1–2–1	GEHA Field at Arrowhead Stadium	Recap

== Regular season ==
=== Schedule ===
Week	Date	Opponent	Result	Record	Venue	Recap
1	September 10	**Cincinnati Bengals**	**W** 24–3	1–0	Cleveland Browns Stadium	Recap
2	September 18	at **Pittsburgh Steelers**	**L** 22–26	1–1	Acrisure Stadium	Recap
3	September 24	Tennessee Titans	**W** 27–3	2–1	Cleveland Browns Stadium	Recap
4	October 1	**Baltimore Ravens**	**L** 3–28	2–2	Cleveland Browns Stadium	Recap
5	Bye					
6	October 15	San Francisco 49ers	**W** 19–17	3–2	Cleveland Browns Stadium	Recap
7	October 22	at Indianapolis Colts	**W** 39–38	4–2	Lucas Oil Stadium	Recap
8	October 29	at Seattle Seahawks	**L** 20–24	4–3	Lumen Field	Recap
9	November 5	Arizona Cardinals	**W** 27–0	5–3	Cleveland Browns Stadium	Recap
10	November 12	at **Baltimore Ravens**	**W** 33–31	6–3	M&T Bank Stadium	Recap
11	November 19	**Pittsburgh Steelers**	**W** 13–10	7–3	Cleveland Browns Stadium	Recap
12	November 26	at Denver Broncos	**L** 12–29	7–4	Empower Field at Mile High	Recap
13	December 3	at Los Angeles Rams	**L** 19–36	7–5	SoFi Stadium	Recap
14	December 10	Jacksonville Jaguars	**W** 31–27	8–5	Cleveland Browns Stadium	Recap
15	December 17	Chicago Bears	**W** 20–17	9–5	Cleveland Browns Stadium	Recap
16	December 24	at Houston Texans	**W** 36–22	10–5	NRG Stadium	Recap
17	December 28	New York Jets	**W** 37–20	11–5	Cleveland Browns Stadium	Recap
18	January 7	at **Cincinnati Bengals**	**L** 14–31	11–6	Paycor Stadium	Recap

Note: Intra-division opponents are in bold text.

=== Game summaries ===
==== Week 1: vs. Cincinnati Bengals ====
Week 1: Cincinnati Bengals at Cleveland Browns – Game summary

Quarter	1	2	3	4	Total
Bengals	0	0	3	0	**3**
**Browns**	0	10	3	11	**24**

at Cleveland Browns Stadium, Cleveland, Ohio

- Date: September 10
- Game time: 1:00 p.m. EDT
- Game weather: Cloudy, 68 °F (20 °C)
- Game attendance: 67,919
- Referee: Clete Blakeman
- TV announcers (CBS): Ian Eagle, Charles Davis and Evan Washburn
- Recap, Game Book

Game information

**First quarter**

- No scoring plays.

**Second quarter**

- CLE – Dustin Hopkins 42-yard field goal, 14:15. Browns 3–0. **Drive: 7 plays, 32 yards, 2:54.**
- CLE – Deshaun Watson 13-yard run (Dustin Hopkins kick), 0:17. Browns 10–0. **Drive: 9 plays, 67 yards, 1:19.**

**Third quarter**

- CIN – Evan McPherson 42-yard field goal, 11:44. Browns 10–3. **Drive: 6 plays, 30 yards, 1:46.**
- CLE – Dustin Hopkins 34-yard field goal, 2:21. Browns 13–3. **Drive: 9 plays, 43 yards, 4:32.**

**Fourth quarter**

- CLE – Dustin Hopkins 43-yard field goal, 11:29. Browns 16–3. **Drive: 6 plays, 39 yards, 3:25.**
- CLE – Harrison Bryant 3-yard pass from Deshaun Watson (Deshaun Watson run), 9:11. Browns 24–3. **Drive: 3 plays, 18 yards, 1:16.**

**Top passers**

- CIN – Joe Burrow – 14/31, 82 yards
- CLE – Deshaun Watson – 16/29, 154 yards, TD, INT

**Top rushers**

- CIN – Joe Mixon – 13 rushes, 56 yards
- CLE – Nick Chubb – 18 rushes, 106 yards

**Top receivers**

- CIN – Ja'Marr Chase – 5 receptions, 39 yards
- CLE – Elijah Moore – 3 receptions, 43 yards

The Browns opened the season with an AFC North matchup against the in-state rival Cincinnati Bengals, marking the 100th meeting between the two franchises.

The Browns defense dominated the game, forcing ten Cincinnati punts including seven three-and-outs, and limiting the Bengals offense to six first downs. Bengals quarterback Joe Burrow was limited to a career-low 82 passing yards. On offense, the Browns were led by Nick Chubb's 106 rushing yards on 18 carries. Quarterback Deshaun Watson had 154 passing yards, 45 rushing yards, a passing touchdown, and a rushing touchdown, despite a 55.2% completion percentage and one interception. Kicker Dustin Hopkins converted all three of his field goal attempts in his Browns debut. The Bengals' lone score came on an Evan McPherson field goal.

With the win, the Browns opened the season 1–0 for the second consecutive year. This marked the first time the Browns won consecutive season openers since 1993 and 1994.

==== Week 2: at Pittsburgh Steelers ====
Week 2: Cleveland Browns at Pittsburgh Steelers – Game summary

Quarter	1	2	3	4	Total
Browns	3	11	8	0	**22**
**Steelers**	7	9	3	7	**26**

at Acrisure Stadium, Pittsburgh, Pennsylvania

- Date: September 18
- Game time: 8:15 p.m. EDT
- Game weather: Clear, 62 °F (17 °C)
- Game attendance: 67,576
- Referee: Ronald Torbert
- TV announcers (ABC): Joe Buck, Troy Aikman and Lisa Salters
- Recap, Game Book

Game information

**First quarter**

- PIT – Alex Highsmith 30-yard interception return (Chris Boswell kick), 14:51. Steelers 7–0.
- CLE – Dustin Hopkins 43-yard field goal, 8:46. Steelers 7–3. **Drive: 11 plays, 50 yards, 6:05.**

**Second quarter**

- CLE – Jerome Ford 2-yard pass from Deshaun Watson (Jerome Ford run), 14:02. Browns 11–7. **Drive: 4 plays, 23 yards, 1:06.**
- PIT – Chris Boswell 52-yard field goal, 9:11. Browns 11–10. **Drive: 4 plays, 5 yards, 1:20.**
- PIT – George Pickens 71-yard pass from Kenny Pickett (run failed), 6:05. Steelers 16–11. **Drive: 4 plays, 82 yards, 1:36.**
- CLE – Dustin Hopkins 55-yard field goal, 0:22. Steelers 16–14. **Drive: 7 plays, 38 yards, 2:24.**

**Third quarter**

- PIT – Chris Boswell 50-yard field goal, 11:47. Steelers 19–14. **Drive: 9 plays, 44 yards, 3:13.**
- CLE – Pierre Strong Jr. 1-yard run (Deshaun Watson run), 10:01. Browns 22–19. **Drive: 4 plays, 75 yards, 1:46.**

**Fourth quarter**

- PIT – T. J. Watt 16-yard fumble return (Chris Boswell kick), 6:58. Steelers 26–22.

**Top passers**

- CLE – Deshaun Watson – 22/40, 235 yards, TD, INT
- PIT – Kenny Pickett – 15/30, 222 yards, TD, INT

**Top rushers**

- CLE – Jerome Ford – 16 rushes, 106 yards
- PIT – Najee Harris – 10 rushes, 43 yards

**Top receivers**

- CLE – Amari Cooper – 7 receptions, 90 yards
- PIT – George Pickens – 4 receptions, 127 yards, TD

After starting the season with a win, the Browns traveled to Pittsburgh to for a second straight division rivalry game, this time with the Pittsburgh Steelers.

Pittsburgh scored on an Alex Highsmith interception returned for a touchdown on the first play from scrimmage to take a 7–0 lead. Cleveland responded with a Dustin Hopkins 43-yard field goal to cut the Steelers lead to 7–3, but failed to get closer on the next drive as Hopkins missed a field goal attempt on the next drive. Early in the second quarter, Browns' Pro Bowl running back Nick Chubb suffered a severe knee injury and was removed from the game; the injury ended Chubb's season. The Browns were able to get into the end zone on that drive on a Deshaun Watson 2-yard touchdown pass to Jerome Ford and added a 2-point conversion after a Pittsburgh penalty to take an 11–7 lead. Pittsburgh responded with a Chris Boswell field goal and a Kenny Pickett 71-yard pass to George Pickens to take a 16–11 lead, but the Browns added another Hopkins field goal before halftime to cut the Steelers' lead down to two points.

On their first drive of the third quarter, Pittsburgh scored on a Boswell 50-yard field goal. The Browns responded with a 1-yard touchdown run by Pierre Strong Jr., set up by a 69-yard run by Ford two plays earlier, to take a 22–19 lead after a Watson run for the 2-point conversion. However, in the fourth quarter T. J. Watt recovered a Watson fumble and returned it for a touchdown to take the lead. The Browns were not able to respond, resulting in a 26–22 Steelers win.

With the loss, the Browns fell to 1–1. This was the Browns' 20th straight regular season loss in Pittsburgh.

==== Week 3: vs. Tennessee Titans ====
Week 3: Tennessee Titans at Cleveland Browns – Game summary

Quarter	1	2	3	4	Total
Titans	0	3	0	0	**3**
**Browns**	3	10	7	7	**27**

at Cleveland Browns Stadium, Cleveland, Ohio

- Date: September 24
- Game time: 1:00 p.m. EDT
- Game weather: Sun/Clouds, 68 °F (20 °C)
- Game attendance: 67,919
- Referee: Craig Wrolstad
- TV announcers (CBS): Spero Dedes, Adam Archuleta and Aditi Kinkhabwala
- Recap, Game Book

Game information

**First quarter**

- CLE – Dustin Hopkins 48-yard field goal, 7:49. Browns 3–0. **Drive: 12 plays, 48 yards, 7:11.**

**Second quarter**

- TEN – Nick Folk 44-yard field goal, 14:14. Tied 3–3. **Drive: 4 plays, 9 yards, 2:06.**
- CLE – Jerome Ford 19-yard pass from Deshaun Watson (Dustin Hopkins kick), 9:39. Browns 10–3. **Drive: 9 plays, 75 yards, 4:35.**
- CLE – Dustin Hopkins 52-yard field goal, 1:00. Browns 13–3. **Drive: 7 plays, 46 yards, 2:49.**

**Third quarter**

- CLE – Jerome Ford 3-yard run (Dustin Hopkins kick), 5:49. Browns 20–3. **Drive: 11 plays, 85 yards, 5:34.**

**Fourth quarter**

- CLE – Amari Cooper 43-yard pass from Deshaun Watson (Dustin Hopkins kick), 6:51. Browns 27–3. **Drive: 10 plays, 64 yards, 6:28.**

**Top passers**

- TEN – Ryan Tannehill – 13/25, 104 yards
- CLE – Deshaun Watson – 27/33, 289 yards, 2 TD

**Top rushers**

- TEN – Derrick Henry – 11 rushes, 20 yards
- CLE – Pierre Strong Jr. – 6 rushes, 27 yards

**Top receivers**

- TEN – DeAndre Hopkins – 3 receptions, 48 yards
- CLE – Amari Cooper – 7 receptions, 116 yards, TD

The Browns returned home for a Week 3 battle with the Tennessee Titans. Cleveland had a 12-play drive on the first possession of the game which culminated in a Dustin Hopkins 48-yard field goal to give the Browns a 3–0 lead. After a Tennessee field goal tied the game early in the second quarter, Cleveland responded with a Deshaun Watson touchdown pass to Jerome Ford and another Hopkins field to take a 13–3 lead into halftime.

The Browns defense held the Titans scoreless through the second half. On offense, the Browns added two touchdowns on a Ford run, the first rushing touchdown of his career, and a 43-yard pass from Watson to Amari Cooper, to give the Browns a 27–3 win.

With the win, the Browns improved to 2–1.

==== Week 4: vs. Baltimore Ravens ====
Week 4: Baltimore Ravens at Cleveland Browns – Game summary

Quarter	1	2	3	4	Total
**Ravens**	7	14	0	7	**28**
Browns	3	0	0	0	**3**

at Cleveland Browns Stadium, Cleveland, Ohio

- Date: October 1
- Game time: 1:00 p.m. EDT
- Game weather: Sunny, 71 °F (22 °C)
- Game attendance: 67,919
- Referee: Brad Allen
- TV announcers (CBS): Ian Eagle, Charles Davis and Evan Washburn
- Recap, Game Book

Game information

**First quarter**

- BAL – Lamar Jackson 10-yard run (Justin Tucker kick), 6:38. Ravens 7–0. **Drive: 1 play, 10 yards, 0:04.**
- CLE – Dustin Hopkins 53-yard field goal, 2:21. Ravens 7–3. **Drive: 8 plays, 40 yards, 4:17.**

**Second quarter**

- BAL – Lamar Jackson 2-yard run (Justin Tucker kick), 4:18. Ravens 14–3. **Drive: 8 plays, 93 yards, 4:24.**
- BAL – Mark Andrews 7-yard pass from Lamar Jackson (Justin Tucker kick), 0:11. Ravens 21–3. **Drive: 10 plays, 74 yards, 2:34.**

**Third quarter**

- No scoring plays.

**Fourth quarter**

- BAL – Mark Andrews 18-yard pass from Lamar Jackson (Justin Tucker kick), 5:56. Ravens 28–3. **Drive: 6 plays, 38 yards, 3:40.**

**Top passers**

- BAL – Lamar Jackson – 15/19, 187 yards, 2 TD
- CLE – Dorian Thompson-Robinson – 19/36, 121 yards, 3 INT

**Top rushers**

- BAL – Gus Edwards – 15 rushes, 48 yards
- CLE – Pierre Strong Jr. – 5 rushes, 49 yards

**Top receivers**

- BAL – Mark Andrews – 5 receptions, 80 yards, 2 TD
- CLE – David Njoku – 6 receptions, 46 yards

The Browns stayed home to take on the Baltimore Ravens, in an early battle for the top spot in the AFC North. In the week leading up to the game, starting quarterback Deshaun Watson was limited in practice due to a shoulder injury. He was ultimately declared inactive for the game after pre-game warmups. Backup quarterback Dorian Thompson-Robinson made his first career start in Watson's place.

After teams exchanged punts to start the game, a Brandon Stephens interception was returned to the Browns' 10 yard-line. This set up a Lamar Jackson touchdown run on the next play to take a 7–0 lead. The Browns responded with a Dustin Hopkins field goal to get on the scoreboard, but the Ravens dominated the rest of the game. Jackson added a second touchdown run and two touchdown passes to Mark Andrews to give the Ravens a 28–3 victory. Meanwhile, the Ravens held Thompson-Robinson to 121 yards in the air and recorded three interceptions. The Browns were held to 166 total yards and 93 rushing yards (40 of which coming on a single Pierre Strong Jr. run in the game's final minute).

With the loss, the Browns entered their bye week at 2–2.

==== Week 6: vs. San Francisco 49ers ====
Week 6: San Francisco 49ers at Cleveland Browns – Game summary

Quarter	1	2	3	4	Total
49ers	7	3	0	7	**17**
**Browns**	0	7	6	6	**19**

at Cleveland Browns Stadium, Cleveland, Ohio

- Date: October 15
- Game time: 1:00 p.m. EDT
- Game weather: Cloudy, 53 °F (12 °C)
- Game attendance: 67,431
- Referee: John Hussey
- TV announcers (Fox): Kevin Burkhardt, Greg Olsen, Erin Andrews and Tom Rinaldi
- Recap, Game Book

Game information

**First quarter**

- SF – Christian McCaffrey 13-yard pass from Brock Purdy (Jake Moody kick), 12:16. 49ers 7–0. **Drive: 5 plays, 84 yards, 2:44.**

**Second quarter**

- SF – Jake Moody 25-yard field goal, 7:54. 49ers 10–0. **Drive: 11 plays, 76 yards, 6:28.**
- CLE – Kareem Hunt 16-yard run (Dustin Hopkins kick), 5:38. 49ers 10–7. **Drive: 5 plays, 83 yards, 2:16.**

**Third quarter**

- CLE – Dustin Hopkins 42-yard field goal, 11:09. Tied 10–10. **Drive: 9 plays, 48 yards, 3:51.**
- CLE – Dustin Hopkins 46-yard field goal, 2:59. Browns 13–10. **Drive: 6 plays, 18 yards, 2:48.**

**Fourth quarter**

- SF – Jordan Mason 8-yard run (Jake Moody kick), 10:58. 49ers 17–13. **Drive: 1 play, 8 yards, 0:06.**
- CLE – Dustin Hopkins 50-yard field goal, 3:21. 49ers 17–16. **Drive: 14 plays, 43 yards, 7:37.**
- CLE – Dustin Hopkins 29-yard field goal, 1:40. Browns 19–17. **Drive: 9 plays, 63 yards, 1:16.**

**Top passers**

- SF – Brock Purdy – 12/27, 125 yards, TD, INT
- CLE – P. J. Walker – 18/34, 192 yards, 2 INT

**Top rushers**

- SF – Christian McCaffrey – 11 rushes, 43 yards
- CLE – Jerome Ford – 17 rushes, 84 yards

**Top receivers**

- SF – Brandon Aiyuk – 4 receptions, 76 yards
- CLE – Amari Cooper – 4 receptions, 108 yards

The Browns returned from their bye week with a game against the 5–0 San Francisco 49ers. San Francisco took their first drive 84 yards in five plays, culminating in a touchdown pass from Brock Purdy to Christian McCaffrey to take an early 7–0 lead. On the Browns' first possession, quarterback P. J. Walker, getting the start in place of the injured Deshaun Watson, threw an interception which was returned to the Cleveland 25-yard line. However, San Francisco could not capitalize as kicker Jake Moody missed a long field goal attempt. In the second quarter, a Moody field goal increased San Francisco's lead to 10–0, but the Browns cut it to 10–7 on a Kareem Hunt 16-yard touchdown run.

The Browns opened the second half with a Dustin Hopkins field goal to tie the score and took a 13–10 lead late in the third quarter on another Hopkins field goal. Early in the fourth quarter, another Walker interception set the 49ers up at the Cleveland 8-yard line, and they would score a touchdown the next play to retake a 17–13 lead. The Browns took the ensuing drive 14 plays for 43 yards and cut the 49ers' lead to one point with Hopkins' third field goal of the half. After their defense forced a three-and-out, The Browns took their next drive deep into San Francisco territory but settled for another Hopkins field goal to take a 19–17 lead with 1:40 remaining in the game. San Francisco quickly drove into Cleveland territory but had to settle for a Moody field goal attempt with nine seconds remaining. Moody missed the kick wide right, preserving the Browns' win.

With the win, the Browns improved to 3–2. Hopkins was named AFC Special Teams Player of the week after his four field goal performance which included the game-winner. Hopkins also became the first player in franchise history to kick a field goal of at least 50 yards in four straight games.

==== Week 7: at Indianapolis Colts ====
Week 7: Cleveland Browns at Indianapolis Colts – Game summary

Quarter	1	2	3	4	Total
**Browns**	7	20	3	9	**39**
Colts	14	7	7	10	**38**

at Lucas Oil Stadium, Indianapolis, Indiana

- Date: October 22
- Game time: 1:00 p.m. EDT
- Game weather: Sunny, 53 °F (12 °C) (retractable roof open)
- Game attendance: 65,552
- Referee: Shawn Smith
- TV announcers (CBS): Spero Dedes, Adam Archuleta and Aditi Kinkhabwala
- Recap, Game Book

Game information

**First quarter**

- CLE – Jerome Ford 69-yard run (Dustin Hopkins kick), 14:03. Browns 7–0. **Drive: 3 plays, 77 yards, 0:57.**
- IND – Josh Downs 59-yard pass from Gardner Minshew (Matt Gay kick), 11:38. Tied 7–7. **Drive: 6 plays, 75 yards, 2:25.**
- IND – Gardner Minshew 17-yard run (Matt Gay kick), 4:28. Colts 14–7. **Drive: 6 plays, 57 yards, 2:25.**

**Second quarter**

- CLE – Kareem Hunt 2-yard run (Dustin Hopkins kick), 14:22. Tied 14–14. **Drive: 5 plays, 36 yards, 2:01.**
- CLE – Dustin Hopkins 44-yard field goal, 8:38. Browns 17–14. **Drive: 4 plays, 0 yards, 1:31.**
- IND – Gardner Minshew 4-yard run (Matt Gay kick), 3:51. Colts 21–17. **Drive: 8 plays, 75 yards, 4:47.**
- CLE – Tony Fields II fumble recovery in end zone (Dustin Hopkins kick), 1:42. Browns 24–21.
- CLE – Dustin Hopkins 54-yard field goal, 0:00. Browns 27–21. **Drive: 7 plays, 34 yards, 1:17.**

**Third quarter**

- CLE – Dustin Hopkins 54-yard field goal, 9:23. Browns 30–21. **Drive: 4 plays, 6 yards, 0:53.**
- IND – Jonathan Taylor 5-yard run (Matt Gay kick), 5:11. Browns 30–28. **Drive: 8 plays, 75 yards, 4:12.**

**Fourth quarter**

- IND – Matt Gay 27-yard field goal, 14:09. Colts 31–30. **Drive: 7 plays, 41 yards, 3:09.**
- CLE – Dustin Hopkins 58-yard field goal, 6:33. Browns 33–31. **Drive: 6 plays, 17 yards, 2:29.**
- IND – Michael Pittman Jr. 75-yard pass from Gardner Minshew (Matt Gay kick), 5:38. Colts 38–33. **Drive: 2 plays, 75 yards, 0:55.**
- CLE – Kareem Hunt 1-yard run (run failed), 0:15. Browns 39–38. **Drive: 12 plays, 80 yards, 2:20.**

**Top passers**

- CLE – P. J. Walker – 15/32, 178 yards, INT
- IND – Gardner Minshew – 15/23, 305 yards, 2 TD, INT

**Top rushers**

- CLE – Jerome Ford – 11 rushes, 74 yards, TD
- IND – Jonathan Taylor – 18 rushes, 75 yards, TD

**Top receivers**

- CLE – Elijah Moore – 4 receptions, 59 yards
- IND – Josh Downs – 5 receptions, 125 yards, TD

After their three-game home stand, the Browns opened a string of five away games in seven weeks with a trip to Indianapolis to take on the Colts. Both teams scored a touchdown on long plays on their first drives: The Browns on a Jerome Ford 69-yard run and the Colts on a Gardner Minshew 59-yard pass to Josh Downs. Later in the quarter, a Minshew touchdown run gave Indianapolis a 14–7 lead. In the second quarter, Cleveland tied the game on a Kareem Hunt touchdown run. Colts kicker Matt Gay lined up for a 60–yard field goal attempt on their next drive, but it was blocked by Myles Garrett, setting up a Dustin Hopkins 44-yard field goal to give the Browns a 17–14 lead. Indianapolis scored a touchdown on their next drive, but on their following drive, Garrett forced a Minshew fumble in the end zone, which was recovered by Tony Fields II in the end zone. A 54-yard field goal by Hopkins gave the Browns a 27–21 lead at halftime.

The Browns opened the scoring in the third quarter with a Hopkins field goal to extend their lead to 30–21. However, the Colts took the ensuing drive 75 yards, culminating in a touchdown run by Jonathan Taylor to cut the Browns' lead to 30–28. The teams traded field goals early in the fourth quarter, with Hopkins hitting a career-long 58-yard kick, to give the Browns a 33–31 lead. That lead lasted less than a minute, as Minshew quickly found Michael Pittman Jr. for a 75-yard touchdown pass to give the Colts a 38–33 lead. After the teams exchanged three-and-outs, the Browns drove 80 yards in 12 plays, with Hunt scoring a 1-yard touchdown run to give the Browns a 39–38 lead with 15 seconds remaining. A Colts fumble in the final seconds sealed the win.

With the win, the Browns improved to 4–2. Garrett was named AFC Defensive Player of the Week after recording two sacks, two forced fumbles, and a blocked kick. Hopkins was named AFC Special Teams Player of the week for a second consecutive week. He kicked four field goals on the day, three of which were over 50 yards, and became the first player in NFL history to make a field goal of at least 50 yards in five consecutive games.

==== Week 8: at Seattle Seahawks ====
Week 8: Cleveland Browns at Seattle Seahawks – Game summary

Quarter	1	2	3	4	Total
Browns	7	7	6	0	**20**
**Seahawks**	17	0	0	7	**24**

at Lumen Field, Seattle, Washington

- Date: October 29
- Game time: 4:05 p.m. EDT/1:05 p.m. PDT
- Game weather: Sunny, 47 °F (8 °C)
- Game attendance: 68,807
- Referee: Bill Vinovich
- TV announcers (Fox): Adam Amin, Daryl Johnston and Pam Oliver
- Recap, Game Book

Game information

**First quarter**

- SEA – Jake Bobo 3-yard run (Jason Myers kick), 8:53. Seahawks 7–0. **Drive: 8 plays, 80 yards, 3:55.**
- SEA – Tyler Lockett 12-yard pass from Geno Smith (Jason Myers kick), 5:30. Seahawks 14–0. **Drive: 6 plays, 41 yards, 2:26.**
- CLE – David Njoku 18-yard pass from P. J. Walker (Dustin Hopkins kick), 3:22. Seahawks 14–7. **Drive: 4 plays, 75 yards, 2:08.**
- SEA – Jason Myers 32-yard field goal, 0:59. Seahawks 17–7. **Drive: 6 plays, 62 yards, 2:23.**

**Second quarter**

- CLE – Kareem Hunt 1-yard run (Dustin Hopkins kick), 4:40. Seahawks 17–14. **Drive: 11 plays, 67 yards, 5:15.**

**Third quarter**

- CLE – Dustin Hopkins 25-yard field goal, 7:29. Tied 17–17. **Drive: 10 plays, 76 yards, 5:49.**
- CLE – Dustin Hopkins 27-yard field goal, 2:50. Browns 20–17. **Drive: 9 plays, 30 yards, 4:05.**

**Fourth quarter**

- SEA – Jaxon Smith-Njigba 9-yard pass from Geno Smith (Jason Myers kick), 0:38. Seahawks 24–20. **Drive: 5 plays, 57 yards, 1:19.**

**Top passers**

- CLE – P. J. Walker – 15/31, 248 yards, TD, 2 INT
- SEA – Geno Smith – 23/37, 254 yards, 2 TD, 2 INT

**Top rushers**

- CLE – Kareem Hunt – 14 rushes, 55 yards, TD
- SEA – Kenneth Walker III – 8 rushes, 66 yards

**Top receivers**

- CLE – Amari Cooper – 6 receptions, 89 yards
- SEA – Tyler Lockett – 8 receptions, 81 yards, TD

The Browns traveled to Seattle for a game with the Seahawks. Seattle raced to an early 14–0 lead on a Jake Bobo 3-yard touchdown run and a Geno Smith 12-yard touchdown pass to Tyler Lockett. However, the Browns defense strengthened after that point, allowing them to get back into the game. They added two touchdowns of their own on a P. J. Walker 18-yard pass to David Njoku and a Kareem Hunt 1-yard run. These sandwiched a Jason Myers field goal to give Seattle a 17–14 lead at halftime.

In the third quarter, Cleveland had drives of ten plays and nine plays and made it inside the Seattle 10-yard line, but could only come away with a pair of Dustin Hopkins field goals to take a 20–17 lead. With just over 2:00 remaining in the fourth, the Browns were attempting to run the clock out but Walker threw a costly interception to Julian Love that tipped off Jamal Adams' helmet. Seattle turned the interception into a Smith touchdown pass to Jaxon Smith-Njigba, giving Seattle a 24–20 lead with 38 seconds remaining. Cleveland was unable to move the ball on their final drive.

With the loss, the Browns fell to 4–3.

==== Week 9: vs. Arizona Cardinals ====
Week 9: Arizona Cardinals at Cleveland Browns – Game summary

Quarter	1	2	3	4	Total
Cardinals	0	0	0	0	**0**
**Browns**	0	13	7	7	**27**

at Cleveland Browns Stadium, Cleveland, Ohio

- Date: November 5
- Game time: 1:00 p.m. EST
- Game weather: Sunny, 56 °F (13 °C)
- Game attendance: 67,919
- Referee: Carl Cheffers
- TV announcers (CBS): Spero Dedes, Adam Archuleta and Aditi Kinkhabwala
- Recap, Game Book

Game information

**First quarter**

- No scoring plays.

**Second quarter**

- CLE – Dustin Hopkins 30-yard field goal, 14:15. Browns 3–0. **Drive: 5 plays, 60 yards, 2:46.**
- CLE – Amari Cooper 11-yard pass from Deshaun Watson (Dustin Hopkins kick), 6:48. Browns 10–0. **Drive: 11 plays, 49 yards, 6:22.**
- CLE – Dustin Hopkins 45-yard field goal, 0:00. Browns 13–0. **Drive: 9 plays, 39 yards, 1:44.**

**Third quarter**

- CLE – David Njoku 5-yard pass from Deshaun Watson (Dustin Hopkins kick), 8:07. Browns 20–0. **Drive: 3 plays, 11 yards, 1:24.**

**Fourth quarter**

- CLE – Kareem Hunt 3-yard run (Dustin Hopkins kick), 7:48. Browns 27–0. **Drive: 4 plays, 56 yards, 2:13.**

**Top passers**

- ARI – Clayton Tune – 11/20, 58 yards, 2 INT
- CLE – Deshaun Watson – 19/30, 219 yards, 2 TD

**Top rushers**

- ARI – Clayton Tune – 5 rushes, 28 yards
- CLE – Jerome Ford – 20 rushes, 44 yards

**Top receivers**

- ARI – Marquise Brown – 4 receptions, 24 yards
- CLE – Amari Cooper – 5 receptions, 139 yards, TD

The Browns returned home to take on the Arizona Cardinals as starting quarterback Deshaun Watson returned to game action following his shoulder injury.

After a scoreless first quarter, the Browns got on the scoreboard early in the second quarter with a Dustin Hopkins field goal. The Browns added a Watson touchdown pass to Amari Cooper and a second Hopkins field goal to take a 13–0 lead into halftime. The Browns continued to dominate in the second half, adding a Watson touchdown pass to Watson touchdown pass to David Njoku and a Kareem Hunt touchdown run for a 27–0 win. The Browns' defense dominated the Cardinals the entire game. In addition to posting a shutout, the defense had seven sacks, three takeaways, and allowed just 58 total yards.

With the win, the Browns improved to 5–3. This marked the Browns' first shutout win since 2007.

==== Week 10: at Baltimore Ravens ====
Week 10: Cleveland Browns at Baltimore Ravens – Game summary

Quarter	1	2	3	4	Total
**Browns**	3	6	8	16	**33**
Ravens	17	0	7	7	**31**

at M&T Bank Stadium, Baltimore, Maryland

- Date: November 12
- Game time: 1:00 p.m. EST
- Game weather: Clear, 49 °F (9 °C)
- Game attendance: 70,424
- Referee: Land Clark
- TV announcers (Fox): Kenny Albert, Jonathan Vilma and Shannon Spake
- Recap, Game Book

Game information

**First quarter**

- BAL – Kyle Hamilton 18-yard interception return (Justin Tucker kick), 14:20. Ravens 7–0.
- BAL – Keaton Mitchell 39-yard run (Justin Tucker kick), 10:13. Ravens 14–0. **Drive: 5 plays, 79 yards, 2:38.**
- CLE – Dustin Hopkins 36-yard field goal, 7:27. Ravens 14–3. **Drive: 10 plays, 49 yards, 2:46.**
- BAL – Justin Tucker 37-yard field goal, 3:29. Ravens 17–3. **Drive: 8 plays, 56 yards, 3:58.**

**Second quarter**

- CLE – Dustin Hopkins 28-yard field goal, 7:30. Ravens 17–6. **Drive: 12 plays, 70 yards, 7:16.**
- CLE – Dustin Hopkins 23-yard field goal, 1:02. Ravens 17–9. **Drive: 6 plays, 33 yards, 1:12.**

**Third quarter**

- BAL – Odell Beckham Jr. 40-yard pass from Lamar Jackson (Justin Tucker kick), 12:29. Ravens 24–9. **Drive: 6 plays, 78 yards, 2:31.**
- CLE – Kareem Hunt 3-yard run (Deshaun Watson run), 2:20. Ravens 24–17. **Drive: 17 plays, 75 yards, 10:09.**

**Fourth quarter**

- BAL – Gus Edwards 3-yard run (Justin Tucker kick), 11:34. Ravens 31–17. **Drive: 7 plays, 12 yards, 3:17.**
- CLE – Elijah Moore 10-yard pass from Deshaun Watson (Dustin Hopkins kick), 8:57. Ravens 31–24. **Drive: 6 plays, 75 yards, 2:37.**
- CLE – Greg Newsome 32-yard interception return (kick failed), 8:16. Ravens 31–30.
- CLE – Dustin Hopkins 40-yard field goal, 0:00. Browns 33–31. **Drive: 12 plays, 58 yards, 1:12.**

**Top passers**

- CLE – Deshaun Watson – 20/34, 213 yards, TD, INT
- BAL – Lamar Jackson – 13/23, 223 yards, TD, 2 INT

**Top rushers**

- CLE – Jerome Ford – 17 rushes, 107 yards
- BAL – Lamar Jackson – 8 rushes, 41 yards

**Top receivers**

- CLE – Amari Cooper – 6 receptions, 98 yards
- BAL – Zay Flowers – 5 receptions, 73 yards

The Browns traveled to Baltimore for round two of their rivalry game with the Ravens. On the second play from scrimmage, Baltimore defensive back Kyle Hamilton intercepted a Deshaun Watson pass and returned it for an 18-yard touchdown to give the Ravens an early 7–0 lead. The Ravens went up 14–0 on a Keaton Mitchell 39-yard touchdown run. After the two sides exchanged field goals, the Ravens led 17–3 after the first quarter. The Browns closed the gap to 17–9 by halftime with a pair of short field goals by Dustin Hopkins.

The Ravens took the opening kickoff of the third quarter and quickly drove down the field, culminating in a 40-yard touchdown pass from Lamar Jackson to former Brown Odell Beckham Jr. to extend their lead to 24–9. However, the Browns came back with a 17-play drive that took over ten minutes off the clock, scoring on a Kareem Hunt 3-yard run to make the score 24–17 after a successful two-point conversion. On the Ravens' next drive, they got close to field goal range, but a Myles Garrett sack of Jackson on third down forced a Ravens punt to start the fourth quarter. However, James Proche fumbled the ensuing punt return, which was recovered by the Ravens on the Cleveland 12-yard line. A Ravens touchdown on an Augustus Edwards 3-yard run increased their lead to 31–17. The Browns then quickly drove down the field for a Watson touchdown pass to Elijah Moore to cut the Ravens' lead to 31–24, and a prompt Greg Newsome interception returned for a touchdown cut the Ravens' lead to 31–30 after Hopkins missed the extra point. After the Browns defense forced a punt, Watson led the Browns on a 12-play drive culminating in a Hopkins 40-yard field goal as time expired for a 33–31 win.

With the win, the Browns improved to 6–3.

The following week, it was revealed Watson suffered a fracture to his right shoulder during the game, requiring season-ending surgery.

==== Week 11: vs. Pittsburgh Steelers ====
Week 11: Pittsburgh Steelers at Cleveland Browns – Game summary

Quarter	1	2	3	4	Total
Steelers	0	0	7	3	**10**
**Browns**	7	3	0	3	**13**

at Cleveland Browns Stadium, Cleveland, Ohio

- Date: November 19
- Game time: 1:00 p.m. EST
- Game weather: Sunny, 48 °F (9 °C)
- Game attendance: 67,919
- Referee: Shawn Hochuli
- TV announcers (CBS): Ian Eagle, Charles Davis and Evan Washburn
- Recap, Game Book

Game information

**First quarter**

- CLE – Jerome Ford 1-yard run (Dustin Hopkins kick), 4:35. Browns 7–0. **Drive: 7 plays, 50 yards, 3:49.**

**Second quarter**

- CLE – Dustin Hopkins 25-yard field goal, 0:05. Browns 10–0. **Drive: 17 plays, 77 yards, 5:24.**

**Third quarter**

- PIT – Jaylen Warren 74-yard run (Chris Boswell kick), 14:10. Browns 10–7. **Drive: 2 plays, 75 yards, 0:50.**

**Fourth quarter**

- PIT – Chris Boswell 28-yard field goal, 7:40. Tied 10–10. **Drive: 13 plays, 62 yards, 7:10.**
- CLE – Dustin Hopkins 34-yard field goal, 0:02. Browns 13–10. **Drive: 8 plays, 48 yards, 1:16.**

**Top passers**

- CLE – Dorian Thompson-Robinson – 24/43, 165 yards, INT
- PIT – Kenny Pickett – 15/28, 106 yards

**Top rushers**

- CLE – Kareem Hunt – 12 rushes, 36 yards
- PIT – Jaylen Warren – 9 rushes, 129 yards, TD

**Top receivers**

- CLE – Elijah Moore – 6 receptions, 60 yards
- PIT – George Pickens – 4 receptions, 38 yards

The Browns returned home to face the Pittsburgh Steelers, hoping to even the season series after a Week 2 loss in Pittsburgh. Rookie quarterback Dorian Thompson-Robinson made his second career start following the season-ending injury to Deshaun Watson. The Browns took a 7–0 lead on a Jerome Ford 1-yard touchdown run, set up by the defense forcing a Pittsburgh punt from within its own 10 yard line. A Dustin Hopkins 25-yard field goal just before halftime gave the Browns a 10–0 lead at the break.

In the first minute of the third quarter, Jaylen Warren cut the Browns' lead to 10–7 with a 74-yard touchdown run. Pittsburgh added a Chris Boswell field goal to tie the game early in the fourth quarter. After the teams exchanged punts, the Browns got the ball back with 1:18 remaining. Thompson-Robinson drove the Browns into the red zone by completing four of five passes for 39 yards to set up a go-ahead 34-yard field goal. Hopkins made the field goal with two seconds remaining to give the Browns a 13–10 lead. An unsuccessful hook and ladder play by Pittsburgh ended the game.

With the win, the Browns improved to 7–3.

==== Week 12: at Denver Broncos ====
Week 12: Cleveland Browns at Denver Broncos – Game summary

Quarter	1	2	3	4	Total
Browns	0	6	6	0	**12**
**Broncos**	7	7	3	12	**29**

at Empower Field at Mile High, Denver, Colorado

- Date: November 26
- Game time: 4:05 p.m. EST/2:05 p.m. MST
- Game weather: Sunny, 40 °F (4 °C)
- Game attendance: 76,261
- Referee: Adrian Hill
- TV announcers (Fox): Kevin Kugler, Mark Sanchez and Laura Okmin
- Recap, Game Book

Game information

**First quarter**

- DEN – Samaje Perine 3-yard run (Wil Lutz kick), 8:14. Broncos 7–0. **Drive: 9 plays, 80 yards, 5:21.**

**Second quarter**

- DEN – Russell Wilson 2-yard run (Wil Lutz kick), 11:11. Broncos 14–0. **Drive: 13 plays, 80 yards, 5:52.**
- CLE – Dustin Hopkins 36-yard field goal, 5:59. Broncos 14–3. **Drive: 13 plays, 57 yards, 5:12.**
- CLE – Dustin Hopkins 24-yard field goal, 0:22. Broncos 14–6. **Drive: 11 plays, 67 yards, 2:42.**

**Third quarter**

- CLE – Harrison Bryant 2-yard pass from Dorian Thompson-Robinson (pass failed), 6:42. Broncos 14–12. **Drive: 13 plays, 79 yards, 6:24.**
- DEN – Wil Lutz 23-yard field goal, 1:25. Broncos 17–12. **Drive: 9 plays, 70 yards, 5:17.**

**Fourth quarter**

- DEN – Adam Trautman 8-yard pass from Russell Wilson (Wil Lutz kick), 13:29. Broncos 24–12. **Drive: 4 plays, 20 yards, 1:25.**
- DEN – Wil Lutz 34-yard field goal, 4:19. Broncos 27–12. **Drive: 7 plays, 42 yards, 4:05.**
- DEN – P. J. Walker sacked in the end zone by Zach Allen for a safety, 2:19. Broncos 29–12.

**Top passers**

- CLE – Dorian Thompson-Robinson – 14/29, 134 yards, TD
- DEN – Russell Wilson – 13/22, 134 yards, TD

**Top rushers**

- CLE – Jerome Ford – 9 rushes, 75 yards
- DEN – Javonte Williams – 18 rushes, 65 yards

**Top receivers**

- CLE – David Njoku – 6 receptions, 59 yards
- DEN – Courtland Sutton – 3 receptions, 61 yards

The Browns traveled to Denver to take on the Broncos, looking to win four straight games for the first time since 2020. Meanwhile, the Broncos were riding a four-game winning streak of their own. Denver scored the only points of the first quarter on a Samaje Perine 3-yard touchdown run to take a 7–0 lead. The Broncos doubled their lead early in the second quarter on a Russell Wilson 2-yard touchdown run. Cleveland was able to get on the board with a pair of field goals late in the second quarter, to close Denver's lead to 14–6 at halftime.

In the third quarter, the Browns found the end zone on Dorian Thompson-Robinson touchdown pass to Harrison Bryant, the first touchdown of Thompson-Robinson's career. However, a failed two-point conversion kept the Browns down 14–12. Late in the third quarter, Denver added a Wil Lutz field goal to extend their lead to 17–12. After Thompson-Robinson suffered a concussion late in the third quarter, he was replaced by third-string quarterback P. J. Walker. The Browns fumbled the ball on the first play of the fourth quarter, resulting in a quick Broncos touchdown on a Wilson pass to Adam Trautman. The Browns offense was not able to get going with Walker under center, while Denver added a field goal and a safety for a 29–12 win.

With the loss, the Browns fell to 7–4.

==== Week 13: at Los Angeles Rams ====
Week 13: Cleveland Browns at Los Angeles Rams – Game summary

Quarter	1	2	3	4	Total
Browns	7	3	3	6	**19**
**Rams**	10	3	7	16	**36**

at SoFi Stadium, Inglewood, California

- Date: December 3
- Game time: 4:25 p.m. EST/1:25 p.m. PST
- Game weather: Cloudy, 67 °F (19 °C) (retractable roof open)
- Game attendance: 72,887
- Referee: John Hussey
- TV announcers (Fox): Kevin Kugler, Mark Sanchez and Laura Okmin
- Recap, Game Book

Game information

**First quarter**

- CLE – Jerome Ford 24-yard pass from Joe Flacco (Dustin Hopkins kick), 10:14. Browns 7–0. **Drive: 9 plays, 75 yards, 4:42.**
- LAR – Lucas Havrisik 44-yard field goal, 6:28. Browns 7–3. **Drive: 7 plays, 49 yards, 3:50.**
- LAR – Puka Nacua 70-yard pass from Matthew Stafford (Lucas Havrisik kick), 3:59. Rams 10–7. **Drive: 2 plays, 79 yards, 0:49.**

**Second quarter**

- CLE – Dustin Hopkins 40-yard field goal, 2:06. Tied 10–10. **Drive: 7 plays, 58 yards, 2:31.**
- LAR – Lucas Havrisik 28-yard field goal, 0:00. Rams 13–10. **Drive: 13 plays, 66 yards, 2:06.**

**Third quarter**

- CLE – Dustin Hopkins 24-yard field goal, 4:58. Tied 13–13. **Drive: 15 plays, 74 yards, 7:34.**
- LAR – Demarcus Robinson 7-yard pass from Matthew Stafford (Lucas Havrisik kick), 0:39. Rams 20–13. **Drive: 7 plays, 75 yards, 4:19.**

**Fourth quarter**

- CLE – Harrison Bryant 8-yard pass from Joe Flacco (kick failed), 8:49. Rams 20–19. **Drive: 13 plays, 75 yards, 6:50.**
- LAR – Cooper Kupp 3-yard pass from Matthew Stafford (Lucas Havrisik kick), 3:48. Rams 27–19. **Drive: 5 plays, 24 yards, 2:44.**
- LAR – Kyren Williams 1-yard run (Lucas Havrisik kick), 1:56. Rams 34–19. **Drive: 5 plays, 30 yards, 0:33.**
- LAR – Joe Flacco sacked in end zone by Kobie Turner and Aaron Donald for a safety, 0:36. Rams 36–19.

**Top passers**

- CLE – Joe Flacco – 23/44, 254 yards, 2 TD, INT
- LAR – Matthew Stafford – 22/37, 279 yards, 3 TD

**Top rushers**

- CLE – Kareem Hunt – 12 rushes, 48 yards
- LAR – Kyren Williams – 21 rushes, 88 yards, TD

**Top receivers**

- CLE – Harrison Bryant – 5 receptions, 49 yards, TD
- LAR – Cooper Kupp – 6 receptions, 39 yards, TD

The Browns stayed in the western United States to take on the Los Angeles Rams. With Dorian Thompson-Robinson remaining in the concussion protocol, Joe Flacco was named the team's starting quarterback. Flacco became the fourth starting quarterback for the Browns in 2023, tying a franchise record for most starting quarterbacks in a single season.

The Browns scored on their opening drive as Flacco connected with Jerome Ford on a 24-yard touchdown pass to take a 7–0 lead. However, the Rams scored on their first two possessions, a Lucas Havrisik field goal and a 70-yard touchdown pass from Matthew Stafford to Puka Nacua to take a 10–7 lead after the first quarter. Cleveland tied the score on a Dustin Hopkins field goal, but a Havrisik field goal late in the second quarter gave Los Angeles a 13–10 halftime lead.

The Browns tied the score late in the third quarter on a Hopkins field goal. However, the Rams retook a 20–13 lead after three quarters on a Stafford touchdown pass to Demarcus Robinson. The Browns scored a touchdown early in the fourth quarter on a Flacco pass to Harrison Bryant, but a missed extra point kept the Browns behind 20–19. After forcing a punt, the Browns had the opportunity to take the lead but Flacco threw an interception. After that, the Rams scored the final 16 points of the game to win 36–19.

With the loss, the Browns fell to 7–5.

==== Week 14: vs. Jacksonville Jaguars ====
Week 14: Jacksonville Jaguars at Cleveland Browns – Game summary

Quarter	1	2	3	4	Total
Jaguars	0	7	7	13	**27**
**Browns**	7	7	7	10	**31**

at Cleveland Browns Stadium, Cleveland, Ohio

- Date: December 10
- Game time: 1:00 p.m. EST
- Game weather: Cloudy, 39 °F (4 °C)
- Game attendance: 67,431
- Referee: Ronald Torbert
- TV announcers (CBS): Ian Eagle, Charles Davis and Evan Washburn
- Recap, Game Book

Game information

**First quarter**

- CLE – David Njoku 34-yard pass from Joe Flacco (Dustin Hopkins kick), 11:39. Browns 7–0. **Drive: 6 plays, 75 yards, 3:21.**

**Second quarter**

- CLE – David Njoku 30-yard pass from Joe Flacco (Dustin Hopkins kick), 13:40. Browns 14–0. **Drive: 4 plays, 72 yards, 1:25.**
- JAX – Evan Engram 10-yard pass from Trevor Lawrence (Brandon McManus kick), 6:14. Browns 14–7. **Drive: 2 plays, 12 yards, 0:39.**

**Third quarter**

- CLE – Kareem Hunt 4-yard run (Dustin Hopkins kick), 9:39. Browns 21–7. **Drive: 7 plays, 22 yards, 4:25.**
- JAX – Travis Etienne 1-yard run (Brandon McManus kick), 4:59. Browns 21–14. **Drive: 6 plays, 25 yards, 2:27.**

**Fourth quarter**

- CLE – David Bell 41-yard pass from Joe Flacco (Dustin Hopkins kick), 12:34. Browns 28–14. **Drive: 4 plays, 48 yards, 1:36.**
- JAX – Parker Washington 19-yard pass from Trevor Lawrence (Brandon McManus kick), 8:52. Browns 28–21. **Drive: 9 plays, 75 yards, 3:42.**
- CLE – Dustin Hopkins 55-yard field goal, 3:10. Browns 31–21. **Drive: 4 plays, 1 yard, 0:20.**
- JAX – Evan Engram 2-yard pass from Trevor Lawrence (pass failed), 1:33. Browns 31–27. **Drive: 9 plays, 75 yards, 1:37.**

**Top passers**

- JAX – Trevor Lawrence – 28/50, 257 yards, 3 TD, 3 INT
- CLE – Joe Flacco – 26/45, 311 yards, 3 TD, INT

**Top rushers**

- JAX – Travis Etienne – 14 rushes, 35 yards, TD
- CLE – Jerome Ford – 12 rushes, 51 yards

**Top receivers**

- JAX – Evan Engram – 11 receptions, 95 yards, 2 TD
- CLE – David Njoku – 6 receptions, 91 yards, 2 TD

After their two-game road trip, the Browns returned home to take on the Jacksonville Jaguars. Cleveland opened the scoring on its first drive, with a 34-yard touchdown pass from Joe Flacco to David Njoku to take a 7–0 lead. After both teams exchanged several punts, Cleveland doubled its lead on a 30-yard touchdown pass from Flacco to Njoku early in the second quarter. Later in the quarter, Jacksonville recovered an Amari Cooper fumble at the Browns' 12-yard line and quickly scored a touchdown on a 10-yard pass from Trevor Lawrence to Evan Engram to cut the Browns' lead to 14–7 at halftime.

Jacksonville took the first possession of the second half but quickly fumbled in their own territory. The Browns cashed in for a Kareem Hunt touchdown run to extend their lead to 21–7. Later in the quarter, the Jaguars took advantage of a short field from another Browns turnover and scored on a Travis Etienne run to cut the Browns' lead to 21–14. Early in the fourth quarter, the Browns went for it on fourth and 3 from the Jacksonville 41-yard line. This play resulted in a touchdown pass from Flacco to David Bell, the first touchdown of Bell's career, extending the Browns' lead to 28–14. Jacksonville took the ensuing drive down the field and scored on a Lawrence touchdown pass to Parker Washington to again cut the Browns' lead to 7 points. After a Browns' punt, Jacksonville elected to go for a fourth and 3 from their own 38-yard line, but failed. The Browns could not move the ball on the next drive, but Dustin Hopkins kicked a 55-yard field goal to give the Browns a two-possession lead at 31–21. Jacksonville scored on its next drive on a 2-yard pass from Lawrence to Engram, set up by a questionable pass interference call on Anthony Walker Jr. A failed 2-point conversion attempt made the score 31–27 with 1:37 remaining. However, Jacksonville could not recover the onside kick and the Browns were able to run out the clock.

With the win, the Browns improved to 8–5. The Browns became the eighth team to win a game with four different starting quarterbacks since quarterback starts were recorded in 1950. This also marked Flacco's 100th career win as a starting quarterback. Hopkins set a franchise record with his 31st made field goal of the season, besting the previous record of 30 held by Phil Dawson.

==== Week 15: vs. Chicago Bears ====
Week 15: Chicago Bears at Cleveland Browns – Game summary

Quarter	1	2	3	4	Total
Bears	0	7	10	0	**17**
**Browns**	0	7	0	13	**20**

at Cleveland Browns Stadium, Cleveland, Ohio

- Date: December 17
- Game time: 1:00 p.m. EST
- Game weather: Rain, 45 °F (7 °C)
- Game attendance: 67,919
- Referee: Brad Allen
- TV announcers (Fox): Kevin Kugler, Mark Sanchez and Laura Okmin
- Recap, Game Book

Game information

**First quarter**

- No scoring plays.

**Second quarter**

- CHI – Cole Kmet 5-yard pass from Justin Fields (Cairo Santos kick), 10:54. Bears 7–0. **Drive: 4 plays, 1 yard, 2:23.**
- CLE – David Njoku 2-yard pass from Joe Flacco (Dustin Hopkins kick), 3:48. Tied 7–7. **Drive: 12 plays, 84 yards, 7:06.**

**Third quarter**

- CHI – Tremaine Edmunds 45-yard interception return (Cairo Santos kick), 13:50. Bears 14–7.
- CHI – Cairo Santos 41-yard field goal, 7:07. Bears 17–7. **Drive: 9 plays, 47 yards, 4:38.**

**Fourth quarter**

- CLE – Dustin Hopkins 33-yard field goal, 12:27. Bears 17–10. **Drive: 6 plays, 52 yards, 2:29.**
- CLE – Amari Cooper 51-yard pass from Joe Flacco (Dustin Hopkins kick), 3:08. Tied 17–17. **Drive: 6 plays, 80 yards, 2:10.**
- CLE – Dustin Hopkins 34-yard field goal, 0:32. Browns 20–17. **Drive: 8 plays, 63 yard, 1:18.**

**Top passers**

- CHI – Justin Fields – 19/40, 166 yards, TD, 2 INT
- CLE – Joe Flacco – 28/44, 374 yards, 2 TD, 3 INT

**Top rushers**

- CHI – Roschon Johnson – 5 rushes, 36 yards
- CLE – Jerome Ford – 8 rushes, 20 yards

**Top receivers**

- CHI – Cole Kmet – 5 receptions, 23 yards, TD
- CLE – David Njoku – 10 receptions, 104 yards, TD

The Browns stayed home to take on the Chicago Bears. After both teams punted on their first four possessions, the Bears opened the scoring on a Justin Fields 5-yard touchdown pass to Cole Kmet which was set up by Eddie Jackson intercepting a Joe Flacco pass and returning the ball to the Cleveland 1-yard line. The Browns responded on their next drive going 84 yards and scoring on a Flacco 2-yard touchdown pass to David Njoku to make the score 7–7 at halftime.

Early in the third quarter, Chicago extended its lead to 14–7 on a Tremaine Edmunds 45-yard interception return touchdown. Chicago extended its lead to 17–7 later in the quarter on a Cairo Santos 41-yard field goal. Early in the fourth quarter, Cleveland cut Chicago's lead to 17–10 on a Dustin Hopkins 33-yard field goal. The Browns later tied the game on a 51-yard touchdown pass from Flacco to Amari Cooper. After forcing a Bears' three-and-out, the Browns took a 20–17 lead on a Hopkins 34-yard field goal with 36 seconds remaining. This field goal was set up by a pair of Flacco passes to Njoku for 31 and 34 yards. The Bears drove to around midfield. On the final play of the game, they attempted a Hail Mary pass which was batted down and fell into Darnell Mooney's hands. However Mooney could not hang onto the football ball and kicked it into the air, which was promptly intercepted by D'Anthony Bell to preserve the win.

With the win, the Browns improved to 9–5. The Browns set a franchise record with their fifth win this season in which they had the game-winning score in the final two minutes of regulation. They also secured their first winning season since 2020, and their fourth since returning to the NFL in 1999.

==== Week 16: at Houston Texans ====
Week 16: Cleveland Browns at Houston Texans – Game summary

Quarter	1	2	3	4	Total
**Browns**	7	15	6	8	**36**
Texans	0	7	0	15	**22**

at NRG Stadium, Houston, Texas

- Date: December 24
- Game time: 1:00 p.m. EST/12:00 p.m. CST
- Game weather: None (retractable roof closed)
- Game attendance: 70,831
- Referee: Tra Blake
- TV announcers (CBS): Ian Eagle, Charles Davis and Evan Washburn
- Recap, Game Book

Game information

**First quarter**

- CLE – Jerome Ford 4-yard run (Dustin Hopkins kick), 13:18. Browns 7–0. **Drive: 4 plays, 59 yards, 1:52.**

**Second quarter**

- CLE – Amari Cooper 75-yard pass from Joe Flacco (Dustin Hopkins kick), 12:04. Browns 14–0. **Drive: 3 plays, 90 yards, 1:32.**
- HOU – Dameon Pierce 98-yard kickoff return (Kaʻimi Fairbairn kick), 11:51. Browns 14–7.
- CLE – David Njoku 21-yard pass from Joe Flacco (Dorian Thompson-Robinson run), 4:16. Browns 22–7. **Drive: 6 plays, 50 yards, 2:51.**

**Third quarter**

- CLE – Amari Cooper 7-yard pass from Joe Flacco (run failed), 2:35. Browns 28–7. **Drive: 18 plays, 94 yards, 9:39.**

**Fourth quarter**

- CLE – Kareem Hunt 1-yard run (Joe Flacco-Amari Cooper pass), 12:31. Browns 36–7. **Drive: 10 plays, 51 yards, 4:06.**
- HOU – Nico Collins 5-yard pass from Davis Mills (Davis Mills-Nico Collins pass), 6:08. Browns 36–15. **Drive: 10 plays, 61 yards, 1:58.**
- HOU – Andrew Beck 1-yard pass from Davis Mills (Kaʻimi Fairbairn kick), 4:12. Browns 36–22. **Drive: 9 plays, 53 yards, 1:56.**

**Top passers**

- CLE – Joe Flacco – 27/42, 368 yards, 3 TD, 2 INT
- HOU – Davis Mills – 15/32, 149 yards, 2 TD

**Top rushers**

- CLE – Jerome Ford – 15 rushes, 25 yards, TD
- HOU – Devin Singletary – 9 rushes, 44 yards

**Top receivers**

- CLE – Amari Cooper – 11 receptions, 265 yards, 2 TD
- HOU – Dalton Schultz – 8 receptions, 61 yards

The Browns traveled to Houston to play the Texans in a game with playoff implications for both teams. The Browns scored a touchdown on their first possession on a Jerome Ford 4-yard run, set up by a 53-yard pass from Joe Flacco to Amari Cooper on the first play from scrimmage. The Browns doubled their lead to 14–0 early in the second quarter on a 75-yard touchdown pass from Flacco to Cooper. However, Houston's Dameon Pierce returned the ensuing kickoff for a 98-yard touchdown to cut the Browns' lead to 14–7. During that play, Browns' kicker Dustin Hopkins injured his hamstring attempting to chase Pierce, forcing Hopkins' early exit and limiting the Browns' kicking options. The Browns added a touchdown and two-point conversion late in the half on a Flacco 21-yard pass to David Njoku to take a 22–7 halftime lead.

After forcing a Houston punt early in the third quarter, the Browns went on an 18-play, 94-yard drive which took almost ten minutes off the clock, culminating in a 7-yard touchdown pass from Flacco to Cooper to extend their lead to 28–7. In the fourth quarter, the Browns extended their lead to 36–7 on a Kareem Hunt touchdown run. Houston added two late touchdowns on Davis Mills passes to Nico Collins and Andrew Beck to make the final score 36–22.

With the win, the Browns improved to 10–5. Cooper was named AFC Offensive Player of the Week with 11 receptions, 265 yards, and two touchdowns. His 265 receiving yards set a franchise record, breaking the previous record of 261 yards held by Josh Gordon. Flacco was named FedEx Air Player of the week after completing 27 of 42 passes, 368 yards, three touchdowns, and two interceptions. He became the first Browns player to record at least 350 passing yards in consecutive games and became the second to have 300 passing yards in three straight games, joining Josh McCown.

==== Week 17: vs. New York Jets ====
Week 17: New York Jets at Cleveland Browns – Game summary

Quarter	1	2	3	4	Total
Jets	7	10	0	3	**20**
**Browns**	20	14	0	3	**37**

at Cleveland Browns Stadium, Cleveland, Ohio

- Date: December 28
- Game time: 8:15 p.m. EST
- Game weather: Cloudy, 47 °F (8 °C)
- Game attendance: 67,919
- Referee: Alex Kemp
- TV announcers (Prime Video): Al Michaels, Kirk Herbstreit and Kaylee Hartung
- Recap, Game Book

Game information

**First quarter**

- CLE – Jerome Ford 7-yard pass from Joe Flacco (Riley Patterson kick), 11:10. Browns 7–0. **Drive: 7 plays, 75 yards, 3:50.**
- NYJ – Breece Hall 21-yard pass from Trevor Siemian (Greg Zuerlein kick), 8:06. Tied 7–7. **Drive: 6 plays, 75 yards, 3:04.**
- CLE – Kareem Hunt 7-yard run (kick failed), 4:43. Browns 13–7. **Drive: 7 plays, 75 yards, 3:23.**
- CLE – Ronnie Hickman 30-yard interception return (Riley Patterson kick), 2:01. Browns 20–7.

**Second quarter**

- CLE – Elijah Moore 8-yard pass from Joe Flacco (Riley Patterson kick), 6:15. Browns 27–7. **Drive: 10 plays, 79 yards, 5:32.**
- NYJ – Jermaine Johnson 37-yard interception return (Greg Zuerlein kick), 2:02. Browns 27–14.
- CLE – Jerome Ford 50-yard pass from Joe Flacco (Riley Patterson kick), 1:25. Browns 34–14. **Drive: 3 plays, 75 yards, 0:37.**
- NYJ – Greg Zuerlein 46-yard field goal, 0:00. Browns 34–17. **Drive: 6 plays, 47 yards, 1:25.**

**Third quarter**

- No scoring plays.

**Fourth quarter**

- NYJ – Greg Zuerlein 44-yard field goal, 8:50. Browns 34–20. **Drive: 7 plays, 9 yards, 3:05.**
- CLE – Riley Patterson 33-yard field goal, 2:54. Browns 37–20. **Drive: 6 plays, 18 yards, 2:27.**

**Top passers**

- NYJ – Trevor Siemian – 32/45, 261 yards, TD, INT
- CLE – Joe Flacco – 19/29, 309 yards, 3 TD, INT

**Top rushers**

- NYJ – Breece Hall – 13 rushes, 84 yards
- CLE – Jerome Ford – 12 rushes, 64 yards

**Top receivers**

- NYJ – Garrett Wilson – 5 receptions, 50 yards
- CLE – David Njoku – 6 receptions, 134 yards

The Browns returned home for a Thursday night game against the New York Jets. Both offenses scored touchdowns on their first drive, with the Browns scoring on a Joe Flacco 7-yard pass to Jerome Ford and the Jets on a Trevor Siemian pass to Breece Hall. On the Browns' next drive, they added another touchdown on a Kareem Hunt run to take a 13–7 lead following a failed extra point. The Browns extended their lead to 20–7 on a Ronnie Hickman interception return late in the first quarter. In the second quarter, Cleveland added another touchdown on a Flacco pass to Elijah Moore to take a 27–7 lead. However, on the Browns' next drive, Flacco threw an interception to Jermaine Johnson II which was returned for a touchdown, cutting Cleveland's lead to 27–14. The Browns scored a touchdown on their next drive on a Flacco 50-yard touchdown pass to Ford, while the Jets closed out the half with a Greg Zuerlein field goal to make the score 34–17.

Defense reigned in the second half. After the Jets took the opening possession into the Browns' 10-yard line, they came up scoreless as the Zuerlein's field goal attempt was blocked by Shelby Harris. After several punts and turnovers, each team kicked a field goal in the second half to make the final score 37–20.

With the win, the Browns improved to 11–5 and clinched a playoff berth for the first time since 2020 and the third time since returning to the NFL in 1999. The Browns finished 8–1 at home. Flacco became the first player in Browns history to have at least 300 passing yards in four consecutive games.

On December 31, Baltimore defeated Miami to clinch the AFC North. This assured the Browns of the 5-seed and marked the Browns’ 31st consecutive season without a division title, the longest active streak in the NFL.

==== Week 18: at Cincinnati Bengals ====
Week 18: Cleveland Browns at Cincinnati Bengals – Game summary

Quarter	1	2	3	4	Total
Browns	0	0	0	14	**14**
**Bengals**	14	10	7	0	**31**

at Paycor Stadium, Cincinnati, Ohio

- Date: January 7
- Game time: 1:00 p.m. EST
- Game weather: Cloudy, 38 °F (3 °C)
- Game attendance: 65,865
- Referee: Alan Eck
- TV announcers (CBS): Tom McCarthy, James Lofton, Jay Feely and Tiffany Blackmon
- Recap, Game Book

Game information

**First quarter**

- CIN – Joe Mixon 1-yard run (Evan McPherson kick), 6:07. Bengals 7–0. **Drive: 7 plays, 60 yards, 4:03.**
- CIN – Joe Mixon 6-yard run (Evan McPherson kick), 0:48. Bengals 14–0. **Drive: 5 plays, 67 yards, 3:03.**

**Second quarter**

- CIN – Andrei Iosivas 3-yard pass from Jake Browning (Evan McPherson kick), 9:19. Bengals 21–0. **Drive: 8 plays, 75 yards, 5:25.**
- CIN – Evan McPherson 45-yard field goal, 1:55. Bengals 24–0. **Drive: 4 plays, 7 yards, 1:19.**

**Third quarter**

- CIN – Andrei Iosivas 7-yard pass from Jake Browning (Evan McPherson kick), 3:32. Bengals 31–0. **Drive: 14 plays, 99 yards, 8:12.**

**Fourth quarter**

- CLE – David Bell 31-yard pass from Jeff Driskel (Riley Patterson kick), 8:45. Bengals 31–7. **Drive: 5 plays, 55 yards, 2:08.**
- CLE – David Bell 24-yard pass from Jeff Driskel (Riley Patterson kick), 2:34. Bengals 31–14. **Drive: 9 plays, 75 yards, 3:58.**

**Top passers**

- CLE – Jeff Driskel – 13/26, 166 yards, 2 TD, 2 INT
- CIN – Jake Browning – 18/24, 156 yards, 3 TD, INT

**Top rushers**

- CLE – Pierre Strong Jr. – 14 rushes, 65 yards
- CIN – Joe Mixon – 14 rushes, 111 yards, TD

**Top receivers**

- CLE – David Bell – 4 receptions, 68 yards, 2 TD
- CIN – Andrei Iosivas – 5 receptions, 36 yards, 2 TD

With Cleveland being assured of the 5-seed no matter what the outcome of this game or any other game in Week 18, the Browns announced they would rest some starters for the game; Jeff Driskel was named the starting quarterback. The Browns set a franchise record for most starting quarterbacks in a season and become the first team since the 1987 New England Patriots to start five quarterbacks in a season.

With most Cleveland starters not playing, Cincinnati dominated the first half and raced to a 24–0 halftime lead on the strength of two Joe Mixon touchdown runs, a Jake Browning touchdown pass to Andrei Iosivas, and an Evan McPherson field goal. In the second half, Cincinnati extended its lead to 31–0 on a second touchdown pass from Browning to Iosivas. The Browns added two late touchdown passes from Driskel to David Bell to make the final score 31–14.

With the loss, the Browns finished the season 11–6. They finished 3–5 in away games.

=== Standings ===
==== Division ====
AFC North
	W	L	T	PCT	DIV	CONF	PF	PA	STK
^{(1)} Baltimore Ravens	13	4	0	.765	3–3	8–4	483	280	L1
^{(5)} Cleveland Browns	11	6	0	.647	3–3	8–4	396	362	L1
^{(7)} Pittsburgh Steelers	10	7	0	.588	5–1	7–5	304	324	W3
Cincinnati Bengals	9	8	0	.529	1–5	4–8	366	384	W1

==== Conference ====
AFC
#	Team	Division	W	L	T	PCT	DIV	CONF	SOS	SOV	STK
**Division leaders**
1	Baltimore Ravens	North	13	4	0	.765	3–3	8–4	.543	.529	L1
2 (Note: Buffalo claimed the No. 2 seed over Kansas City based on head-to-head victory.) (Note: Buffalo finished ahead of Miami in the AFC East based on head-to-head sweep.)	Buffalo Bills	East	11	6	0	.647	4–2	7–5	.471	.471	W5
3	Kansas City Chiefs	West	11	6	0	.647	4–2	9–3	.481	.428	W2
4	Houston Texans	South	10	7	0	.588	4–2	7–5	.474	.465	W2
**Wild cards**
5 (Note: Cleveland claimed the No. 5 seed over Miami based on conference record.)	Cleveland Browns	North	11	6	0	.647	3–3	8–4	.536	.513	L1
6	Miami Dolphins	East	11	6	0	.647	4–2	7–5	.450	.358	L2
7	Pittsburgh Steelers	North	10	7	0	.588	5–1	7–5	.540	.571	W3
**Did not qualify for the postseason**
8 (Note: Cincinnati finished ahead of Jacksonville based on head-to-head victory. Division tie break was initially used to eliminate Indianapolis (see below).)	Cincinnati Bengals	North	9	8	0	.529	1–5	4–8	.574	.536	W1
9 (Note: Jacksonville finished ahead of Indianapolis based on head-to-head sweep.)	Jacksonville Jaguars	South	9	8	0	.529	4–2	6–6	.533	.477	L1
10	Indianapolis Colts	South	9	8	0	.529	3–3	7–5	.491	.444	L1
11 (Note: Las Vegas finished ahead of Denver based on head-to-head sweep.)	Las Vegas Raiders	West	8	9	0	.471	4–2	6–6	.488	.426	W1
12	Denver Broncos	West	8	9	0	.471	3–3	5–7	.488	.485	L1
13	New York Jets	East	7	10	0	.412	2–4	4–8	.502	.454	W1
14	Tennessee Titans	South	6	11	0	.353	1–5	4–8	.522	.422	W1
15	Los Angeles Chargers	West	5	12	0	.294	1–5	3–9	.529	.388	L5
16	New England Patriots	East	4	13	0	.235	2–4	4–8	.522	.529	L2
**Tiebreakers** (Note: When breaking ties for three or more teams under the NFL's rules, they are first broken within divisions, then comparing only the highest ranked remaining team from each division.)

=== Team leaders ===
==== Regular season ====
Category	Player(s)	Value
Passing yards	Joe Flacco	1,616
Passing touchdowns	Joe Flacco	13
Rushing yards	Jerome Ford	807
Rushing touchdowns	Kareem Hunt	9
Receptions	David Njoku	81
Receiving yards	Amari Cooper	1,250
Receiving touchdowns	David Njoku	6
Points	Dustin Hopkins	123
Kickoff return yards	Pierre Strong	200
Punt return yards	James Proche	191
Tackles	Jeremiah Owusu-Koramoah	101
Sacks	Myles Garrett	14.0
Forced fumbles	Myles Garrett	4
Interceptions	Martin Emerson	4
Pass deflections	2 players tied	14

== Postseason ==
=== Schedule ===
Round	Date	Opponent (seed)	Result	Record	Venue	Recap
Wild Card	January 13	at Houston Texans (4)	L 14–45	0–1	NRG Stadium	Recap

=== Game summaries ===
==== AFC Wild Card Playoffs: at (4) Houston Texans ====
AFC Wild Card Playoffs: (5) Cleveland Browns at (4) Houston Texans – Game Summary

Quarter	1	2	3	4	Total
Browns	7	7	0	0	14
Texans	10	14	14	7	45

at NRG Stadium, Houston, Texas

- Date: January 13, 2024
- Game time: 4:30 p.m. EST/3:30 p.m. CST
- Game weather: None (retractable roof closed)
- Game attendance: 71,946
- Referee: Clay Martin
- TV announcers (NBC): Noah Eagle, Todd Blackledge and Kathryn Tappen
- Recap, Game Book

Game information

First quarter

- HOU – Kaʻimi Fairbairn 21-yard field goal, 5:29. Texans 3–0. Drive: 7 plays, 43 yards, 2:54.
- CLE – Kareem Hunt 1-yard run (Riley Patterson kick), 2:09. Browns 7–3. Drive: 6 plays, 75 yards, 3:20.
- HOU – Nico Collins 15-yard pass from C. J. Stroud (Kaʻimi Fairbairn kick), 0:11. Texans 10–7. Drive: 4 plays, 75 yards, 1:58.

Second quarter

- CLE – Kareem Hunt 11-yard pass from Joe Flacco (Riley Patterson kick), 12:18. Browns 14–10. Drive: 6 plays, 75 yards, 2:53.
- HOU – Brevin Jordan 76-yard pass from C. J. Stroud (Kaʻimi Fairbairn kick), noon. Texans 17–14. Drive: 1 play, 76 yards, 0:18.
- HOU – Dalton Schultz 37-yard pass from C. J. Stroud (Kaʻimi Fairbairn kick), 1:11. Texans 24–14. Drive: 8 plays, 71 yards, 4:33.

Third quarter

- HOU – Steven Nelson 82-yard interception return (Kaʻimi Fairbairn kick), 6:05. Texans 31–14.
- HOU – Christian Harris 36-yard interception return (Kaʻimi Fairbairn kick), 4:06. Texans 38–14.

Fourth quarter

- HOU – Devin Singletary 19-yard run (Kaʻimi Fairbairn kick), 4:06. Texans 45–14. Drive: 6 plays, 50 yards, 3:00.

Top passers

- CLE – Joe Flacco – 34/46, 307 yards, TD, 2 INT
- HOU – C. J. Stroud – 16/21, 274 yards, 3 TD

Top rushers

- CLE – Kareem Hunt – 8 rushes, 26 yards, TD
- HOU – Devin Singletary – 13 rushes, 66 yards, TD

Top receivers

- CLE – David Njoku – 7 receptions, 93 yards
- HOU – Nico Collins – 6 receptions, 96 yards, TD

This was the first postseason meeting between the Browns and Texans. During the regular season, the Browns defeated the Texans 36–22 in Houston in Week 16. Deshaun Watson, who was the starting quarterback for Cleveland since 2022, suffered a season-ending injury in Week 10. He was the starting quarterback for Houston from 2017 to 2020.

After a competitive first half that was led by the Texans, they took a commanding lead after the turn of the half, in which Joe Flacco threw back-to-back interceptions that were returned for touchdowns. This was the Texans' first playoff win since the 2019 season.

== 2024 Pro Bowl Games ==
Seven Browns players – G Joel Bitonio, WR Amari Cooper, DE Myles Garrett, TE David Njoku, LB Jeremiah Owusu-Koramoah, Wyatt Teller, and CB Denzel Ward – were selected to represent the AFC in the 2024 Pro Bowl Games. Bitonio, Cooper, and Garrett were selected as starters, while Njoku and Ward were selected as reserves. Owusu-Koramoah and Teller were originally selected as alternates, but made the roster as injury replacements. This marks the sixth consecutive and sixth overall selection for Bitonio, fifth selection for Cooper and Garrett, fourth for Teller, third for Ward, and first for Njoku and Owusu-Koramoah.

In addition, P Corey Bojorquez, S Grant Delpit, K Dustin Hopkins, and C Ethan Pocic were selected as alternates.
