= 2025 Minnesota Vikings season =

65th season in franchise history

- Owner: Zygi Wilf
- General manager: Kwesi Adofo-Mensah
- Head coach: Kevin O'Connell
- Home stadium: U.S. Bank Stadium

Results
- Record: 9–8
- Division place: 3rd NFC North
- Playoffs: Did not qualify
- All-Pros: K Will Reichard (1st team); LS Andrew DePaola (2nd team)
- Pro Bowlers: None

Uniform
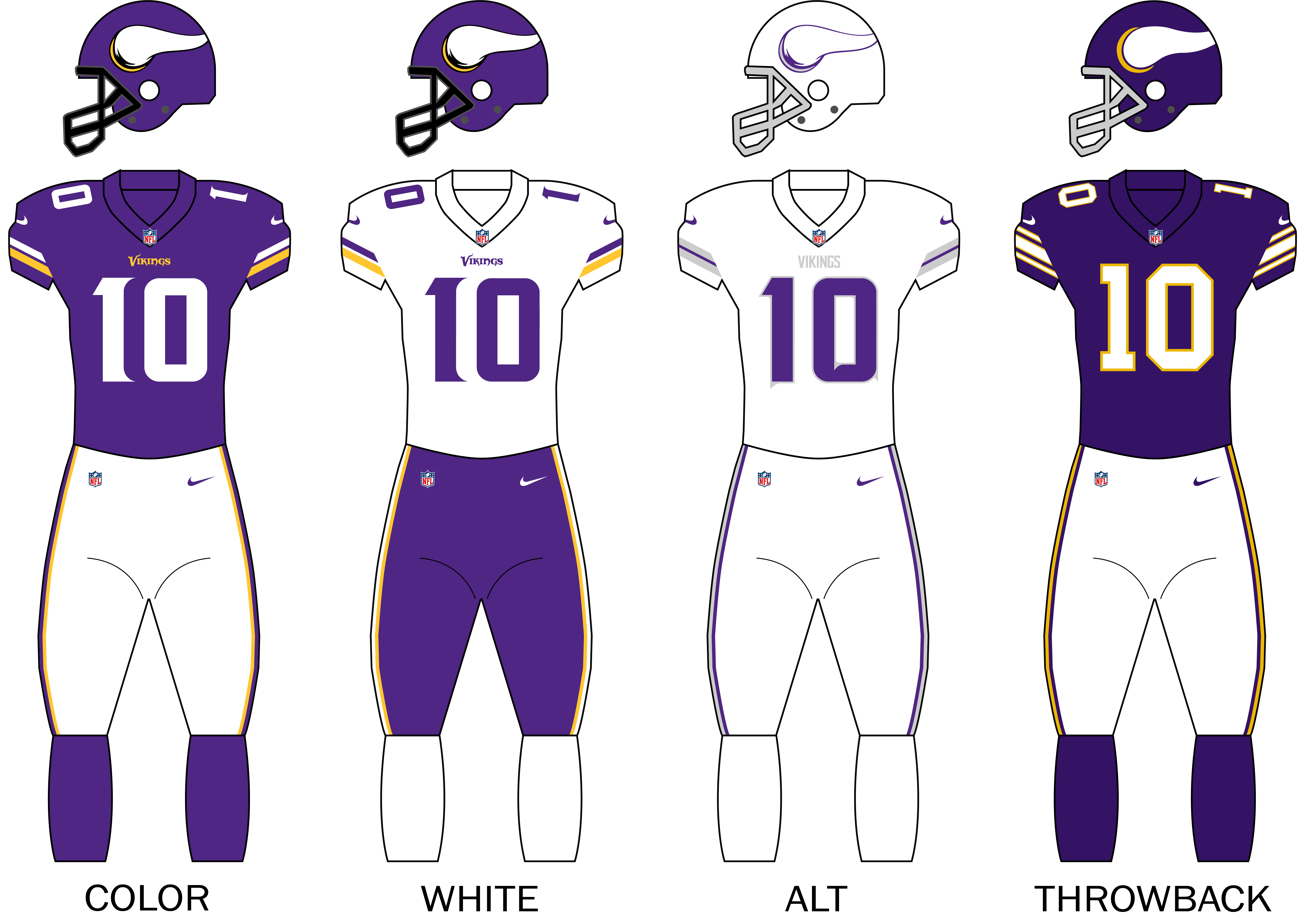

The 2025 season was the Minnesota Vikings' 65th in the National Football League (NFL), their 10th playing their home games at U.S. Bank Stadium, their 21st under the ownership of Zygi Wilf, their fourth under head coach Kevin O'Connell and their fourth and final under general manager Kwesi Adofo-Mensah. The Vikings failed to improve on their 14–3 record from 2024 after a Week 7 loss to the defending Super Bowl champion Philadelphia Eagles, and guaranteed a worse record the following week after losing to the Los Angeles Chargers. Weak offensive performance and a quarterback carousel led the team to a 4–8 start, their worst since they started 3–8–1 in 2013. They were eliminated from playoff contention after a Chicago Bears win over the Cleveland Browns in Week 15. However, the Vikings did rally to win their final five games to secure a winning record. For the first time since 2014, not a single Viking made the Pro Bowl games. On January 30, the Vikings announced that general manager Kwesi Adofo-Mensah had been fired from the team. Overall, starting quarterback J. J. McCarthy had a poor season by throwing just 1,632 yards, 11 touchdowns, 12 interceptions, and completed just 57.6% (140 for 243) of his passes to go with his 72.6 passer rating. He contributed 15 total touchdowns to 14 turnovers.

== Offseason ==
=== Futures contracts ===
Position	Player	Date signed	Source
OT	Trevor Reid	January 9	
NT	Travis Bell	January 15	
CB	Kahlef Hailassie	January 15	
OT	Marcellus Johnson	January 15	
DB	Reddy Stewart	January 15	
QB	Brett Rypien	January 15	
RB	Zavier Scott	January 15	
LB	Max Tooley	January 15	
LB	Gabriel Murphy	January 15	
G	Henry Byrd	January 15	
OT	Leroy Watson	January 15	
WR	Lucky Jackson	January 15	
DE	Jonathan Harris	January 15	
WR	Thayer Thomas	January 15	
CB	Ambry Thomas	January 16	
CB	Nahshon Wright	January 17	
WR	Jeshaun Jones	January 17	

=== Free agents ===
Position	Player	Free agency tag	2025 team	Date signed	Notes	Source
RB	Cam Akers	UFA	New Orleans Saints	June 13	1 year	
DE	Jonathan Bullard	UFA	New Orleans Saints	July 23	1 year, $1.4225 million	
S	Camryn Bynum	UFA	Indianapolis Colts	March 12	4 years, $60 million	
QB	Sam Darnold	UFA	Seattle Seahawks	March 13	3 years, $100.5 million	
G	Dan Feeney	UFA	Buffalo Bills	August 4	1 year	
CB	Stephon Gilmore	UFA				
CB	Shaquill Griffin	UFA	Seattle Seahawks	June 25	1 year, $3 million	
ILB	Kamu Grugier-Hill	UFA				
S	Theo Jackson	RFA	Minnesota Vikings	March 7	2 years, $12.65 million	
RB	Aaron Jones	UFA	Minnesota Vikings	March 11	2 years, $20 million	
QB	Daniel Jones	UFA	Indianapolis Colts	March 12	1 year, $14 million	
OLB	Patrick Jones II	UFA	Carolina Panthers	March 10	2 years, $20 million	
CB	Fabian Moreau	UFA	San Francisco 49ers	August 4	1 year, $1.255 million	
QB	Nick Mullens	UFA	Jacksonville Jaguars	March 12	2 years, $4.5 million	
TE	Johnny Mundt	UFA	Jacksonville Jaguars	March 12	2 years, $5.5 million	
CB	Byron Murphy	UFA	Minnesota Vikings	March 12	3 years, $54 million	
WR	Brandon Powell	UFA				
OT	David Quessenberry	UFA	Los Angeles Rams	May 29	1 year, $1.33 million	
DE	Jalen Redmond	ERFA	Minnesota Vikings	January 16	1 year, $960,000	
G	Dalton Risner	UFA	Cincinnati Bengals	August 28	1 year, $1.3375 million	
OT	Cam Robinson	UFA	Houston Texans	March 25	1 year, $12 million	
WR	Trent Sherfield	UFA	Denver Broncos	March 13	2 years, $6 million	
DE	Jerry Tillery	UFA	Kansas City Chiefs	March 19	1 year, $1.79 million	
OLB	Jihad Ward	UFA	Tennessee Titans	July 24	1 year, $1.405 million	
P	Ryan Wright	RFA	Minnesota Vikings	March 11	1 year, $1.75 million	

=== Signings ===
Position	Player	Free agency tag	Former team	Date signed	Notes	Source
S	Bubba Bolden	UFA	Birmingham Stallions (UFL)	March 10	1 year, $840,000	
DE	Jonathan Allen	UFA	Washington Commanders	March 12	3 years, $51 million	
C	Ryan Kelly	UFA	Indianapolis Colts	March 12	2 years, $18 million	
G	Will Fries	UFA	Indianapolis Colts	March 13	5 years, $87.7 million	
DE	Javon Hargrave	UFA	San Francisco 49ers	March 13	2 years, $30 million	
CB	Isaiah Rodgers	UFA	Philadelphia Eagles	March 13	2 years, $11.045 million	
OT	Justin Skule	UFA	Tampa Bay Buccaneers	March 13	1 year, $2 million	
CB/ST	Tavierre Thomas	UFA	Tampa Bay Buccaneers	March 13	1 year, $2 million	
LB	Eric Wilson	UFA	Green Bay Packers	March 14	1 year, $2.6 million	
CB	Jeff Okudah	UFA	Houston Texans	March 18	1 year, $2.35 million	
WR	Tim Jones	UFA	Jacksonville Jaguars	March 18	1 year, $1.1 million	
WR	Rondale Moore	UFA	Atlanta Falcons	March 19	1 year, $2 million	
QB	Carson Wentz	UFA	Kansas City Chiefs	August 24	1 years, $1.4225 million	

=== Releases ===
Position	Player	New team	Date released	Source
C	Garrett Bradbury	New England Patriots	March 17	

=== Extensions ===
Position	Player	Date signed	Notes	Source
S	Harrison Smith	March 12		

=== Trades ===
Position	Player	Team	Date traded	Notes	Source
G	Ed Ingram	Houston Texans	March 13	MIN receives: 2026 sixth-round pick HOU receives: Ingram	
RB	Jordan Mason	San Francisco 49ers	March 18	MIN receives: 2025 sixth-round pick, Mason; SF receives: 2025 fifth-round pick, 2026 sixth-round pick	
QB	Sam Howell	Seattle Seahawks	April 26	MIN receives: 2025 sixth-round pick, Howell; SEA receives: 2025 fifth-round pick	
DT	Harrison Phillips	New York Jets	August 21	MIN receives: 2026 sixth-round pick, 2027 sixth-round pick NYJ receives: 2027 seventh-round pick, Phillips	
QB	Sam Howell	Philadelphia Eagles	August 24	MIN receives: 2026 fifth-round pick, 2027 seventh-round pick PHI receives: 2026 sixth-round pick, Howell	
CB	Mekhi Blackmon	Indianapolis Colts	August 25	MIN receives: 2026 sixth-round pick IND receives: Blackmon	
WR	Adam Thielen	Carolina Panthers	August 27	MIN receives: 2026 seventh-round pick, 2027 fifth-round pick, Thielen; CAR receives: 2026 fifth-round pick, 2027 fourth-round pick	

=== Draft ===
Having been eliminated from the playoffs in the wild card round after a 14–3 regular season in 2024, the Vikings had the 24th pick in each round of the 2025 NFL draft. They were scheduled to go into the draft with four selections, their fewest since making five picks in 2009. As well as their original first-round pick, they were also awarded a third-round pick in compensation for the departure of QB Kirk Cousins during the 2024 offseason, and acquired an additional fifth-round pick in a trade that sent DE Za'Darius Smith to the Cleveland Browns; that same deal sent the Vikings' original sixth- and seventh-round picks to the Browns. Their original second-round pick was sent to the Houston Texans in order to acquire another first-round selection in 2024; that pick was then sent to the Jacksonville Jaguars in a package with their original third- and fourth-round selections in the 2025 draft in order to move up again and select OLB Dallas Turner. They also traded picks with the San Francisco 49ers in order to acquire RB Jordan Mason, giving up their original fifth-round selection and a 2026 sixth-round pick for a 2025 sixth-round selection. The Vikings had been expected to receive an additional seventh-round pick in a trade that sent G Jesse Davis to the Pittsburgh Steelers in 2022, but the conditions of the trade were not met and the pick remained with the Steelers.

2025 Minnesota Vikings draft selections
Round	Selection	Player	Position	College	Notes
1	24	Donovan Jackson	G	Ohio State	
2	56	Traded to the Houston Texans (Note: The Vikings traded a second-round selection (56th overall), and 2024 second- and sixth-round selections (42nd and 188th overall) to the Houston Texans in exchange for 2024 first- and seventh-round selections (23rd and 232nd overall).)			
3	88	Traded to the Jacksonville Jaguars (Note: The Vikings traded third- and fourth-round selections (88th and 126th overall), and 2024 first- and fifth-round selections (23rd and 167th overall) to the Jacksonville Jaguars in exchange for a 2024 first-round selection (17th overall).)			
3	97	Traded to the Houston Texans (Note: The Vikings traded third- and sixth-round selections (97th and 187th overall) to the Houston Texans in exchange for third- and fifth-round selections (102nd and 142nd overall).)			Compensatory selection
3	102	Tai Felton	WR	Maryland	2020 Resolution JC-2A selection; From Lions via Jaguars and Texans
4	126	Traded to the Jacksonville Jaguars			
5	139	Tyrion Ingram-Dawkins	DT	Georgia	From Browns (Note: The Vikings traded sixth- and seventh-round selections (200th and 240th overall), and DE Za'Darius Smith to the Cleveland Browns in exchange for a fifth-round selection (139th overall) and a 2024 fifth-round selection (157th overall).)
5	142	Traded to the Seattle Seahawks (Note: The Vikings traded a fifth-round selection (142nd overall) to the Seattle Seahawks in exchange for a fifth-round selection (172nd overall) and QB Sam Howell.)			From Jaguars via Texans
5	160	Traded to the San Francisco 49ers (Note: The Vikings traded a fifth-round selection (160th overall) and a 2026 sixth-round selection to the San Francisco 49ers in exchange for a sixth-round selection (187th overall) and RB Jordan Mason.)			
5	172	Traded to the Los Angeles Rams (Note: The Vikings traded a fifth-round selection (172nd overall) to the Los Angeles Rams in exchange for two sixth-round selections (201st and 202nd overall).)			From Seahawks
6	187	Traded to the Houston Texans			From 49ers
6	200	Traded to the Cleveland Browns			
6	201	Kobe King	LB	Penn State	From Rams
6	202	Gavin Bartholomew	TE	Pittsburgh	From Texans via Steelers, Bears and Rams
7	240	Traded to the Cleveland Browns			

2025 Minnesota Vikings undrafted free agents
Name	Position	College	Ref.
Tyler Batty	OLB	BYU	
Silas Bolden	WR	Texas	
Max Brosmer	QB	Minnesota	
Logan Brown	OT	Kansas	
Chaz Chambliss	OLB	Georgia	
Oscar Chapman	P	Auburn	
Zeke Correll	C	NC State	
Dontae Fleming	WR	Tulane	
Keenan Garber	CB	Kansas State	
Matt Harmon	OLB	Kent State	
Joe Huber	G	Wisconsin	
Austin Keys	LB	Auburn	
Robert Lewis	WR	Auburn	
Vershon Lee	C	South Carolina	
Dorian Mausi	LB	Auburn	
Bryson Nesbit	TE	North Carolina	
Mishael Powell	S	Miami (FL)	
Myles Price	WR	Indiana	
Tre Stewart	RB	Jacksonville State	
Zemaiah Vaughn	CB	Utah	
Alex Williams	DE	Middle Tennessee	
Elijah Williams	DE	Morgan State	
Ben Yurosek	TE	Georgia	

Draft trades

== Staff ==
2025 Minnesota Vikings staff
Front office: Owner/chairman – Zygi Wilf; Owner/vice chairman – Leonard Wilf; Owner/president – Mark Wilf; Chief operating officer – Andrew Miller; General manager – Kwesi Adofo-Mensah; Executive vice president of football operations – Rob Brzezinski; Assistant general manager – Ryan Grigson; Assistant general manager – Demitrius Washington; Director of player personnel – Ryan Monnens; Assistant director of player personnel – Chisom Opara; Director of pro personnel – Sam DeLuca; Senior personnel executive – Jamaal Stephenson; Director of college scouting – Mike Sholiton; Senior college executive – Pat Roberts; Head coaches: Head coach – Kevin O'Connell; Assistant head coach – Mike Pettine; Assistant to the head coach – Henry Schneider IV; Offensive coaches: Offensive coordinator – Wes Phillips; Quarterbacks – Josh McCown; Assistant offensive coordinator/assistant quarterbacks – Jordan Traylor; Running game coordinator/running backs – Curtis Modkins; Wide receivers – Keenan McCardell; Assistant wide receivers – Tony Sorrentino; Passing game coordinator/tight ends – Brian Angelichio; Offensive line – Chris Kuper; Assistant offensive line – Keith Carter; Game management coordinator/passing game specialist – Ryan Cordell; Senior offensive assistant – Chris O'Hara; Offensive assistant – Ben Ellefson; Quality control/offense – Derron Montgomery	Defensive coaches: Defensive coordinator – Brian Flores; Defensive line – Marcus Dixon; Assistant defensive line – Imarjaye Albury Sr.; Outside linebackers – Thad Bogardus; Assistant outside linebackers – Patrick Hill; Inside linebackers – Mike Siravo; Passing game coordinator/defensive backs – Daronte Jones; Safeties – Michael Hutchings; Defensive assistant – Charlie Frye; Quality control/defense – Chenzo Funari; Special teams coaches: Special teams coordinator – Matt Daniels; Assistant special teams – Dalmin Gibson; Strength and conditioning: Director of player performance – Josh Hingst; Director of football development/Assistant performance coach – Derik Keyes; Assistant player performance – Marquis Johnson

== Final roster ==
2025 Minnesota Vikings roster
Quarterbacks (QB): 12 Max Brosmer; 9 J. J. McCarthy; 14 Brett Rypien; 5 John Wolford; Running backs (RB): 32 Ty Chandler; 30 C. J. Ham FB; 33 Aaron Jones; 27 Jordan Mason; 36 Zavier Scott; Wide receivers (WR): 3 Jordan Addison; 13 Tai Felton; 18 Justin Jefferson; 1 Jalen Nailor; 4 Myles Price; Tight ends (TE): 87 T. J. Hockenson; 84 Josh Oliver; 89 Ben Sims; 85 Ben Yurosek	Offensive linemen (OL): 64 Blake Brandel RG; 68 Henry Byrd G; 76 Will Fries RG; 60 Joe Huber LG; 74 Donovan Jackson LG; 65 Michael Jurgens C; 75 Brian O'Neill RT; 73 Walter Rouse RT; 67 Justin Skule LT; Defensive linemen (DL): 93 Jonathan Allen DE; 97 Javon Hargrave DE; 90 Tyrion Ingram-Dawkins DE; 61 Jalen Redmond DE; 50 Levi Drake Rodriguez NT; 94 Taki Taimani NT	Linebackers (LB): 96 Tyler Batty OLB; 51 Blake Cashman ILB; 57 Chaz Chambliss OLB; 0 Ivan Pace Jr. ILB; 98 Bo Richter OLB; 15 Dallas Turner OLB; 43 Andrew Van Ginkel OLB; 55 Eric Wilson ILB; Defensive backs (DB): 26 Theo Jackson SS; 6 Dwight McGlothern CB; 23 Fabian Moreau CB; 7 Byron Murphy CB; 2 Isaiah Rodgers CB; 22 Harrison Smith SS; 37 Tavierre Thomas CB; 34 Zemaiah Vaughn CB; 24 Jay Ward FS; Special teams (ST): 42 Andrew DePaola LS; 16 Will Reichard K; 17 Ryan Wright P	Practice squad: 81 Joaquin Davis WR; 79 Caleb Etienne LT; 19 Dontae Fleming WR; 29 Tyrek Funderburk CB; 25 Kahlef Hailassie FS; 92 Jonathan Harris DE; 82 Jeshaun Jones WR; 66 Vershon Lee G; 35 Sincere McCormick RB; 59 Gabriel Murphy OLB; 83 Bryson Nesbit TE; 63 Max Pircher RT (IPP); 52 Josh Ross ILB; 40 Sione Takitaki ILB; Reserve: 86 Gavin Bartholomew TE (IR/DFR); -- Zeke Correll C (IR); 71 Christian Darrisaw LT (IR); 58 Jonathan Greenard OLB (IR); 78 Ryan Kelly C (IR); 44 Josh Metellus S (IR); -- Rondale Moore WR (IR); -- Matt Nelson LT (IR); 8 Jeff Okudah CB (IR); 11 Carson Wentz QB (IR); 99 Elijah Williams DE (IR); Rookies in italics 53 active, 11 reserve, 14 practice squad

== Preseason ==
=== Schedule ===
The Vikings' preseason opponents and schedule were announced on May 14, in conjunction with the release of the regular season schedule.

Week	Date	Opponent	Result	Record	Venue	Recap
1	August 9	Houston Texans	W 20–10	1–0	U.S. Bank Stadium	Recap
2	August 16	New England Patriots	L 12–20	1–1	U.S. Bank Stadium	Recap
3	August 22	at Tennessee Titans	L 13–23	1–2	Nissan Stadium	Recap

=== Game summaries ===
==== Week 1: vs. Houston Texans ====
Preseason Week 1: Houston Texans at Minnesota Vikings – Game summary

Quarter	1	2	3	4	Total
Texans	7	0	3	0	10
Vikings	3	10	0	7	20

at U.S. Bank Stadium, Minneapolis, Minnesota

- Date: August 9
- Game time: 3:00 p.m. CDT
- Game weather: None (indoor stadium)
- Game attendance: 66,715
- Referee: Brad Allen (122)
- TV announcers (KMSP/NFLN): Paul Allen, Pete Bercich and Ben Leber
- Recap, Game Book

Game information

First quarter

- MIN – Will Reichard 48-yard field goal, 8:57. Vikings 3–0. Drive: 13 plays, 58 yards, 6:03.
- HOU – Braxton Berrios 14-yard pass from Davis Mills (Kaʻimi Fairbairn kick), 3:54. Texans 7–3. Drive: 10 plays, 74 yards, 5:03.

Second quarter

- MIN – Will Reichard 38-yard field goal, 12:27. Texans 7–6. Drive: 12 plays, 40 yards, 6:27.
- MIN – Sam Howell 1-yard run (Will Reichard kick), 3:20. Vikings 13–7. Drive: 14 plays, 94 yards, 7:10.

Third quarter

- HOU – Kaʻimi Fairbairn 43-yard field goal, 9:42. Vikings 13–10. Drive: 10 plays, 48 yards, 5:18.

Fourth quarter

- MIN – Myles Price 3-yard pass from Max Brosmer (Will Reichard kick), 9:48. Vikings 20–10. Drive: 9 plays, 40 yards, 3:48.

Top passers

- HOU – Kedon Slovis – 11/15, 71 yards
- MIN – Sam Howell – 11/13, 105 yards

Top rushers

- HOU – Dare Ogunbowale – 5 rushes, 29 yards
- MIN – Zavier Scott – 7 rushes, 40 yards

Top receivers

- HOU – John Metchie III – 5 receptions, 45 yards
- MIN – Jordan Addison – 3 receptions, 33 yards

==== Week 2: vs. New England Patriots ====
Preseason Week 2: New England Patriots at Minnesota Vikings – Game summary

Quarter	1	2	3	4	Total
Patriots	7	7	0	6	20
Vikings	0	3	3	6	12

at U.S. Bank Stadium, Minneapolis, Minnesota

- Date: August 16
- Game time: 12:00 p.m. CDT
- Game weather: None (indoor stadium)
- Game attendance: 66,705
- Referee: Carl Cheffers (51)
- TV announcers (KMSP): Paul Allen, Pete Bercich and Ben Leber
- Recap, Game Book

Game information

First quarter

- NE – TreVeyon Henderson 8-yard run (Andres Borregales kick), 4:32. Patriots 7–0. Drive: 9 plays, 52 yards, 4:35.

Second quarter

- NE – Efton Chism 12-yard pass from Joshua Dobbs (Andres Borregales kick), 1:01. Patriots 14–0. Drive: 13 plays, 88 yards, 5:48.
- MIN – Will Reichard 34-yard field goal, 0:05. Patriots 14–3. Drive: 7 plays, 53 yards, 0:56.

Third quarter

- MIN – Will Reichard 54-yard field goal, 8:47. Patriots 14–6. Drive: 12 plays, 48 yards, 6:13.

Fourth quarter

- NE – John Parker Romo 28-yard field goal, 14:11. Patriots 17–6. Drive: 11 plays, 37 yards, 4:37.
- MIN – Will Reichard 47-yard field goal, 11:24. Patriots 17–9. Drive: 7 plays, 31 yards, 2:47.
- NE – Andres Borregales 51-yard field goal, 6:24. Patriots 20–9. Drive: 10 plays, 32 yards, 5:00.
- MIN – Will Reichard 27-yard field goal, 5:20. Patriots 20–12. Drive: 4 plays, −1 yard, 1:04.

Top passers

- NE – Joshua Dobbs – 11/16, 106 yards, TD
- MIN – Max Brosmer – 15/27, 156 yards, INT

Top rushers

- NE – JaMycal Hasty – 11 rushes, 47 yards
- MIN – Zavier Scott – 10 rushes, 28 yards

Top receivers

- NE – Efton Chism – 6 receptions, 71 yards, TD
- MIN – Tim Jones – 5 receptions, 68 yards

==== Week 3: at Tennessee Titans ====
Preseason Week 3: Minnesota Vikings at Tennessee Titans – Game summary

Quarter	1	2	3	4	Total
Vikings	3	0	7	3	13
Titans	0	14	3	6	23

at Nissan Stadium, Nashville, Tennessee

- Date: August 22
- Game time: 7:00 p.m. CDT
- Game weather: Clear, 89 °F (32 °C)
- Game attendance: 60,637
- Referee: Alex Kemp (55)
- TV announcers (CBS): Andrew Catalon, Charles Davis, Jason McCourty and AJ Ross
- Recap, Game Book

Game information

First quarter

- MIN – Will Reichard 42-yard field goal, 5:48. Vikings 3–0. Drive: 8 plays, 51 yards, 3:34.

Second quarter

- TEN – Julius Chestnut 1-yard run (Joey Slye kick), 12:15. Titans 7–3. Drive: 13 plays, 90 yards, 8:33.
- TEN – Van Jefferson 65-yard pass from Brandon Allen (Joey Slye kick), 5:13. Titans 14–3. Drive: 6 plays, 85 yards, 3:24.

Third quarter

- TEN – Joey Slye 63-yard field goal, 11:14. Titans 17–3. Drive: 6 plays, 15 yards, 3:46.
- MIN – Bryson Nesbit 21-yard pass from Max Brosmer (Will Reichard kick), 8:34. Titans 17–10. Drive: 5 plays, 65 yards, 2:40.

Fourth quarter

- TEN – Joey Slye 30-yard field goal, 10:40. Titans 20–10. Drive: 6 plays, 43 yards, 3:18.
- MIN – Will Reichard 58-yard field goal, 7:52. Titans 20–13. Drive: 9 plays, 40 yards, 2:48.
- TEN – Joey Slye 53-yard field goal, 1:49. Titans 23–13. Drive: 12 plays, 42 yards, 6:03.

Top passers

- MIN – Max Brosmer – 15/23, 161 yards, TD
- TEN – Brandon Allen – 9/15, 137 yards, TD

Top rushers

- MIN – Xazavian Valladay – 8 rushes, 39 yards
- TEN – Jermar Jefferson – 5 rushes, 41 yards

Top receivers

- MIN – Dontae Fleming – 2 receptions, 53 yards
- TEN – Van Jefferson – 3 receptions, 102 yards, TD

== Regular season ==
=== Schedule ===
The Vikings played eight games at home and nine on the road in 2025. In addition to home and away matchups against each of their NFC North divisional rivals, they squared off against each of the teams in the NFC East and AFC North, as well as the teams that also finished in second place in each of the NFC South, NFC West and AFC West.

The NFL announced the International Series matchups for 2025 prior to the rest of the schedule on May 13. The Vikings were named as the road team for two of these games: against the Pittsburgh Steelers at Croke Park in Dublin in week 4, and the Cleveland Browns at Tottenham Hotspur Stadium in London in week 5. The next day, the NFL announced the Vikings would play in a Christmas Day game at home to the Detroit Lions; it was the Vikings' fifth Christmas Day game and their third at home. The remainder of the schedule was announced at 7:00 p.m. CDT on May 14, 2025.

Week	Date	Opponent	Result	Record	Venue	Recap
1	September 8	at **Chicago Bears**	**W** 27–24	1–0	Soldier Field	Recap
2	September 14	Atlanta Falcons	**L** 6–22	1–1	U.S. Bank Stadium	Recap
3	September 21	Cincinnati Bengals	**W** 48–10	2–1	U.S. Bank Stadium	Recap
4	September 28	at Pittsburgh Steelers	**L** 21–24	2–2	(Republic of Ireland) Croke Park (Dublin)	Recap
5	October 5	at Cleveland Browns	**W** 21–17	3–2	(United Kingdom) Tottenham Hotspur Stadium (London)	Recap
6	Bye					
7	October 19	Philadelphia Eagles	**L** 22–28	3–3	U.S. Bank Stadium	Recap
8	October 23	at Los Angeles Chargers	**L** 10–37	3–4	SoFi Stadium	Recap
9	November 2	at **Detroit Lions**	**W** 27–24	4–4	Ford Field	Recap
10	November 9	Baltimore Ravens	**L** 19–27	4–5	U.S. Bank Stadium	Recap
11	November 16	**Chicago Bears**	**L** 17–19	4–6	U.S. Bank Stadium	Recap
12	November 23	at **Green Bay Packers**	**L** 6–23	4–7	Lambeau Field	Recap
13	November 30	at Seattle Seahawks	**L** 0–26	4–8	Lumen Field	Recap
14	December 7	Washington Commanders	**W** 31–0	5–8	U.S. Bank Stadium	Recap
15	December 14	at Dallas Cowboys	**W** 34–26	6–8	AT&T Stadium	Recap
16	December 21	at New York Giants	**W** 16–13	7–8	MetLife Stadium	Recap
17	December 25	**Detroit Lions**	**W** 23–10	8–8	U.S. Bank Stadium	Recap
18	January 4	**Green Bay Packers**	**W** 16–3	9–8	U.S. Bank Stadium	Recap

Note: Intra-division opponents are in bold text.

=== Game summaries ===
==== Week 1: at Chicago Bears ====
Week 1: Minnesota Vikings at Chicago Bears – Game summary

Quarter	1	2	3	4	Total
**Vikings**	0	6	0	21	**27**
Bears	7	3	7	7	**24**

at Soldier Field, Chicago, Illinois

- Date: September 8
- Game time: 7:15 p.m. CDT
- Game weather: Clear, 68 °F (20 °C)
- Game attendance: 58,742
- Referee: Alan Eck (76)
- TV announcers (ESPN/ABC): Joe Buck, Troy Aikman, Lisa Salters and Laura Rutledge
- Recap, Game Book

Game information

**First quarter**

- CHI – Caleb Williams 9-yard run (Cairo Santos kick), 7:04. Bears 7–0. **Drive: 10 plays, 61 yards, 5:41.**

**Second quarter**

- MIN – Will Reichard 31-yard field goal, 12:48. Bears 7–3. **Drive: 7 plays, 67 yards, 3:10.**
- CHI – Cairo Santos 42-yard field goal, 0:24. Bears 10–3. **Drive: 9 plays, 35 yards, 4:05.**
- MIN – Will Reichard 59-yard field goal, 0:06. Bears 10–6. **Drive: 2 plays, 28 yards, 0:18.**

**Third quarter**

- CHI – Nahshon Wright 74-yard interception return (Cairo Santos kick), 12:51. Bears 17–6.

**Fourth quarter**

- MIN – Justin Jefferson 13-yard pass from J. J. McCarthy (pass failed), 12:13. Bears 17–12. **Drive: 6 plays, 60 yards, 2:42.**
- MIN – Aaron Jones Sr. 27-yard pass from J. J. McCarthy (J. J. McCarthy–Adam Thielen pass), 9:46. Vikings 20–17. **Drive: 3 plays, 50 yards, 0:51.**
- MIN – J. J. McCarthy 14-yard run (Will Reichard kick), 2:53. Vikings 27–17. **Drive: 9 plays, 68 yards, 4:31.**
- CHI – Rome Odunze 1-yard pass from Caleb Williams (Cairo Santos kick), 2:02. Vikings 27–24. **Drive: 5 plays, 65 yards, 0:51.**

**Top passers**

- MIN – J. J. McCarthy – 13/20, 143 yards, 2 TD, INT
- CHI – Caleb Williams – 21/35, 210 yards, TD

**Top rushers**

- MIN – Jordan Mason – 15 rushes, 68 yards
- CHI – Caleb Williams – 6 rushes, 58 yards, TD

**Top receivers**

- MIN – Aaron Jones Sr. – 3 receptions, 44 yards, TD
- CHI – D. J. Moore – 3 receptions, 68 yards

The Vikings opened up the season on the road against the division rival Chicago Bears on Monday Night Football. The Vikings got off to a rocky start in J. J. McCarthy's NFL debut, trailing the Bears 17–6 by the end of the third quarter, which included a pick-six by former Viking Nahshon Wright. However, the Vikings came back and outscored the Bears 21–7 in the fourth quarter to win 27–24. This marked the Vikings' sixth consecutive win against the Bears at Soldier Field, the longest winning streak there in team history.

J. J. McCarthy became the first quarterback in NFL history to score three fourth-quarter touchdowns in an NFL debut, the first Vikings quarterback to throw multiple touchdowns in an NFL debut since Fran Tarkenton did so in the team's inaugural season in 1961, and the first quarterback to overcome a fourth-quarter deficit of at least 10 points in an NFL debut since Steve Young did it with the Tampa Bay Buccaneers in 1985.

==== Week 2: vs. Atlanta Falcons ====
Week 2: Atlanta Falcons at Minnesota Vikings – Game summary

Quarter	1	2	3	4	Total
**Falcons**	6	3	3	10	**22**
Vikings	0	6	0	0	**6**

at U.S. Bank Stadium, Minneapolis, Minnesota

- Date: September 14
- Game time: 7:20 p.m. CDT
- Game weather: None (indoor stadium)
- Game attendance: 66,859
- Referee: Adrian Hill (29)
- TV announcers (NBC): Mike Tirico, Cris Collinsworth and Melissa Stark
- Recap, Game Book

Game information

**First quarter**

- ATL – John Parker Romo 38-yard field goal, 11:12. Falcons 3–0. **Drive: 6 plays, 45 yards, 3:48.**
- ATL – John Parker Romo 29-yard field goal, 6:48. Falcons 6–0. **Drive: 7 plays, 26 yards, 2:30.**

**Second quarter**

- MIN – Will Reichard 33-yard field goal, 7:06. Falcons 6–3. **Drive: 17 plays, 53 yards, 9:22.**
- ATL – John Parker Romo 33-yard field goal, 0:25. Falcons 9–3. **Drive: 7 plays, 23 yards, 1:38.**
- MIN – Will Reichard 51-yard field goal, 0:00. Falcons 9–6. **Drive: 3 plays, 47 yards, 0:25.**

**Third quarter**

- ATL — John Parker Romo 33-yard field goal, 6:17. Falcons 12–6. **Drive: 13 plays, 64 yards, 7:47.**

**Fourth quarter**

- ATL – John Parker Romo 54-yard field goal, 11:16. Falcons 15–6. **Drive: 6 plays, 2 yards, 3:39.**
- ATL – Tyler Allgeier 5-yard run (John Parker Romo kick), 3:22. Falcons 22–6. **Drive: 12 plays, 83 yards, 6:17.**

**Top passers**

- ATL – Michael Penix Jr. – 13/21, 135 yards
- MIN – J. J. McCarthy – 11/21, 158 yards, 2 INT

**Top rushers**

- ATL – Bijan Robinson – 22 rushes, 143 yards
- MIN – Jordan Mason – 9 rushes, 30 yards

**Top receivers**

- ATL – Drake London – 3 receptions, 49 yards
- MIN – Justin Jefferson – 3 receptions, 81 yards

==== Week 3: vs. Cincinnati Bengals ====
Week 3: Cincinnati Bengals at Minnesota Vikings – Game summary

Quarter	1	2	3	4	Total
Bengals	0	3	0	7	**10**
**Vikings**	14	20	14	0	**48**

at U.S. Bank Stadium, Minneapolis, Minnesota

- Date: September 21
- Game time: 12:00 p.m. CDT
- Game weather: None (indoor stadium)
- Game attendance: 66,792
- Referee: Ron Torbert (62)
- TV announcers (CBS): Jim Nantz, Tony Romo and Tracy Wolfson
- Recap, Game Book

Game information

**First quarter**

- MIN – Josh Oliver 12-yard pass from Carson Wentz (Will Reichard kick), 12:57. Vikings 7–0. **Drive: 6 plays, 64 yards, 2:03.**
- MIN – Isaiah Rodgers 87-yard interception return (Will Reichard kick), 6:08. Vikings 14–0.

**Second quarter**

- MIN – Will Reichard 35-yard field goal, 9:20. Vikings 17–0. **Drive: 10 plays, 26 yards, 4:28.**
- CIN – Evan McPherson 45-yard field goal, 4:42. Vikings 17–3. **Drive: 9 plays, 48 yards, 4:38.**
- MIN – Isaiah Rodgers 66-yard fumble recovery (Will Reichard kick), 1:47. Vikings 24–3.
- MIN – Jordan Mason 5-yard run (Will Reichard kick), 0:33. Vikings 31–3. **Drive: 3 plays, 52 yards, 0:48.**
- MIN – Will Reichard 62-yard field goal, 0:00. Vikings 34–3. **Drive: 4 plays, 3 yards, 0:20.**

**Third quarter**

- MIN – Jordan Mason 4-yard run (Will Reichard kick), 6:00. Vikings 41–3. **Drive: 10 plays, 74 yards, 6:42.**
- MIN – T. J. Hockenson 5-yard pass from Carson Wentz (Will Reichard kick), 0:17. Vikings 48–3. **Drive: 6 plays, 68 yards, 3:32.**

**Fourth quarter**

- CIN – Drew Sample 4-yard pass from Jake Browning (Evan McPherson kick), 11:12. Vikings 48–10. **Drive: 7 plays, 65 yards, 4:05.**

**Top passers**

- CIN – Jake Browning – 19/27, 140 yards, TD, 2 INT
- MIN – Carson Wentz – 14/20, 173 yards, 2 TD

**Top rushers**

- CIN – Samaje Perine – 4 rushes, 21 yards
- MIN – Jordan Mason – 16 rushes, 116 yards, 2 TD

**Top receivers**

- CIN – Ja'Marr Chase – 5 receptions, 50 yards
- MIN – Justin Jefferson – 5 receptions, 75 yards

Quarterback Carson Wentz made his debut for the Vikings in place of injured starter J. J. McCarthy, becoming the first quarterback in NFL history to start for six different teams in six consecutive seasons. With the dominant win, the Vikings improved to 2–1. Cornerback Isiah Rodgers made NFL history by becoming the first player to return an interception for a touchdown, return a fumble for a touchdown, and force two fumbles in a single game, doing it all in the first half. Rodgers also became the first Viking to score multiple defensive touchdowns in franchise history. Additionally, Vikings kicker Will Reichard kicked a 62-yard field goal, setting a franchise record for longest field goal made.

==== Week 4: at Pittsburgh Steelers ====
NFL International Series

Week 4: Minnesota Vikings at Pittsburgh Steelers – Game summary

Quarter	1	2	3	4	Total
Vikings	3	3	0	15	**21**
**Steelers**	7	7	7	3	**24**

at Croke Park, Dublin, Ireland

- Date: September 28
- Game time: 2:30 p.m. IST/8:30 a.m. CDT
- Game weather: Mostly cloudy, 61 °F (16 °C)
- Game attendance: 74,512
- Referee: Brad Allen (122)
- TV announcers (KMSP/NFLN): Joe Davis, Greg Olsen, Pam Oliver and Jamie Erdahl
- Recap, Game Book

Game information

**First quarter**

- MIN – Will Reichard 41-yard field goal, 6:24. Vikings 3–0. **Drive: 11 plays, 51 yards, 6:25.**
- PIT – Kenneth Gainwell 1-yard run (Chris Boswell kick), 0:55. Steelers 7–3. **Drive: 9 plays, 71 yards, 5:29.**

**Second quarter**

- PIT – DK Metcalf 80-yard pass from Aaron Rodgers (Chris Boswell kick), 12:16. Steelers 14–3. **Drive: 1 play, 80 yards, 0:12.**
- MIN – Will Reichard 28-yard field goal, 0:12. Steelers 14–6. **Drive: 9 plays, 81 yards, 1:26.**

**Third quarter**

- PIT – Kenneth Gainwell 4-yard run (Chris Boswell kick), 2:23. Steelers 21–6. **Drive: 5 plays, 35 yards, 2:52.**

**Fourth quarter**

- PIT – Chris Boswell 33-yard field goal, 11:18. Steelers 24–6. **Drive: 8 plays, 31 yards, 4:17.**
- MIN – Zavier Scott 16-yard pass from Carson Wentz (Carson Wentz–Jalen Nailor pass), 7:50. Steelers 24–14. **Drive: 9 plays, 70 yards, 3:28.**
- MIN – Jalen Nailor 2-yard pass from Carson Wentz (Will Reichard kick), 2:08. Steelers 24–21. **Drive: 7 plays, 99 yards, 2:01.**

**Top passers**

- MIN – Carson Wentz – 30/46, 350 yards, 2 TD, 2 INT
- PIT – Aaron Rodgers – 18/22, 200 yards, TD

**Top rushers**

- MIN – Jordan Mason – 16 rushes, 57 yards
- PIT – Kenneth Gainwell – 19 rushes, 99 yards, 2 TD

**Top receivers**

- MIN – Justin Jefferson – 10 receptions, 126 yards
- PIT – DK Metcalf – 5 receptions, 126 yards, TD

The Vikings faced the Steelers in the NFL's first regular-season game in Ireland. With the loss, the Vikings fell to 2–2.

==== Week 5: at Cleveland Browns ====
NFL International Series

Week 5: Minnesota Vikings at Cleveland Browns – Game summary

Quarter	1	2	3	4	Total
**Vikings**	7	0	7	7	**21**
Browns	7	3	7	0	**17**

at Tottenham Hotspur Stadium, London, England

- Date: October 5, 2025
- Game time: 2:30 p.m. BST/8:30 a.m. CDT
- Game weather: Cloudy, 61 °F (16 °C)
- Game attendance: 61,082
- Referee: Scott Novak (1)
- TV announcers (KMSP/NFLN): Kenny Albert, Jonathan Vilma and Sara Walsh
- Recap, Game Book

Game information

**First quarter**

- CLE – Harold Fannin Jr. 1-yard pass from Dillon Gabriel (Andre Szmyt kick), 6:49. Browns 7–0. **Drive: 7 plays, 47 yards, 3:28.**
- MIN – Josh Oliver 32-yard pass from Cam Akers (Will Reichard kick), 2:30. Tied 7–7. **Drive: 8 plays, 82 yards, 4:19.**

**Second quarter**

- CLE – Andre Szmyt 31-yard field goal, 0:09. Browns 10–7. **Drive: 14 plays, 53 yards, 2:21.**

**Third quarter**

- MIN – Jordan Mason 3-yard run (Will Reichard kick), 11:11. Vikings 14–10. **Drive: 8 plays, 71 yards, 3:49.**
- CLE – David Njoku 9-yard pass from Dillon Gabriel (Andre Szmyt kick), 3:05. Browns 17–14. **Drive: 13 plays, 69 yards, 8:06.**

**Fourth quarter**

- MIN – Jordan Addison 12-yard pass from Carson Wentz (Will Reichard kick), 0:25. Vikings 21–17. **Drive: 10 plays, 80 yards, 2:40.**

**Top passers**

- MIN – Carson Wentz – 25/34, 236 yards, TD
- CLE – Dillon Gabriel – 19/33, 190 yards, 2 TD

**Top rushers**

- MIN – Jordan Mason – 13 rushes, 52 yards, TD
- CLE – Quinshon Judkins – 23 rushes, 110 yards

**Top receivers**

- MIN – Justin Jefferson – 7 receptions, 123 yards
- CLE – David Njoku – 6 receptions, 67 yards, TD

With the win, the Vikings entered their bye week at 3–2 and improved to 5–0 when playing in London.

==== Week 7: vs. Philadelphia Eagles ====
Week 7: Philadelphia Eagles at Minnesota Vikings – Game summary

Quarter	1	2	3	4	Total
**Eagles**	7	7	7	7	**28**
Vikings	3	3	10	6	**22**

at U.S. Bank Stadium, Minneapolis, Minnesota

- Date: October 19
- Game time: 12:00 p.m. CDT
- Game weather: None (indoor stadium)
- Game attendance: 66,899
- Referee: Bill Vinovich (52)
- TV announcers (Fox): Adam Amin, Greg Olsen and Pam Oliver
- Recap, Game Book

Game information

**First quarter**

- PHI – A. J. Brown 37-yard pass from Jalen Hurts (Jake Elliott kick), 6:59. Eagles 7–0. **Drive: 12 plays, 75 yards, 8:01.**
- MIN – Will Reichard 59-yard field goal, 2:04. Eagles 7–3. **Drive: 11 plays, 39 yards, 4:55.**

**Second quarter**

- PHI – Jalyx Hunt 42-yard interception return (Jake Elliott kick), 13:26. Eagles 14–3.
- MIN – Will Reichard 34-yard field goal, 6:34. Eagles 14–6. **Drive: 7 plays, 64 yards, 3:03.**

**Third quarter**

- MIN – Will Reichard 28-yard field goal, 9:02. Eagles 14–9. **Drive: 10 plays, 42 yards, 5:58.**
- PHI – Devonta Smith 79-yard pass from Jalen Hurts (Jake Elliott kick), 8:07. Eagles 21–9. **Drive: 2 plays, 84 yards, 0:55.**
- MIN – Jordan Mason 1-yard run (Will Reichard kick), 3:38. Eagles 21–16. **Drive: 8 plays, 60 yards, 4:29.**

**Fourth quarter**

- MIN – Will Reichard 35-yard field goal, 10:06. Eagles 21–19. **Drive: 7 plays, 51 yards, 4:09.**
- PHI – A. J. Brown 26-yard pass from Jalen Hurts (Jake Elliott kick), 6:35. Eagles 28–19. **Drive: 7 plays, 70 yards, 3:31.**
- MIN – Will Reichard 29-yard field goal, 1:57. Eagles 28–22. **Drive: 16 plays, 61 yards, 4:38.**

**Top passers**

- PHI – Jalen Hurts – 19/23, 326 yards, 3 TD
- MIN – Carson Wentz – 26/42, 313 yards, 2 INT

**Top rushers**

- PHI – Saquon Barkley – 18 rushes, 44 yards
- MIN – Jordan Mason – 15 rushes, 57 yards, TD

**Top receivers**

- PHI – DeVonta Smith – 9 receptions, 183 yards, TD
- MIN – Jordan Addison – 9 receptions, 128 yards

The Vikings' defense struggled, allowing Eagles quarterback Jalen Hurts to complete 19-of-23 passes for 326 yards and three touchdowns, achieving a perfect passer rating. On a 3rd-and-9 with 1:45 remaining, the defense gave up a 45-yard pass from Hurts to wide receiver A. J. Brown, effectively sealing the game. With the loss, the Vikings fell to 3–3.

==== Week 8: at Los Angeles Chargers ====
Week 8: Minnesota Vikings at Los Angeles Chargers – Game summary

Quarter	1	2	3	4	Total
Vikings	0	3	7	0	**10**
**Chargers**	7	14	3	13	**37**

at SoFi Stadium, Inglewood, California

- Date: October 23
- Game time: 5:15 p.m. PDT/7:15 p.m. CDT
- Game weather: Sunny, 68 °F (20 °C) (fixed roof)
- Game attendance: 71,094
- Referee: Clete Blakeman (34)
- TV announcers (KMSP/Prime Video): Al Michaels, Kirk Herbstreit and Kaylee Hartung
- Recap, Game Book

Game information

**First quarter**

- LAC – Oronde Gadsden II 8-yard pass from Justin Herbert (Cameron Dicker kick), 4:01. Chargers 7–0. **Drive: 14 plays, 83 yards, 7:39.**

**Second quarter**

- LAC – Kimani Vidal 3-yard run (Cameron Dicker kick), 13:08. Chargers 14–0. **Drive: 8 plays, 59 yards, 4:04.**
- MIN – Will Reichard 54-yard field goal, 8:55. Chargers 14–3. **Drive: 9 plays, 35 yards, 4:13.**
- LAC – Ladd McConkey 27-yard pass from Justin Herbert (Cameron Dicker kick), 0:45. Chargers 21–3. **Drive: 9 plays, 94 yards, 3:19.**

**Third quarter**

- LAC – Cameron Dicker 43-yard field goal, 10:01. Chargers 24–3. **Drive: 9 plays, 42 yards, 4:59.**
- MIN – Jordan Addison 4-yard pass from Carson Wentz (Will Reichard kick), 4:36. Chargers 24–10. **Drive: 6 plays, 26 yards, 2:22.**

**Fourth quarter**

- LAC – Tre Harris 6-yard pass from Justin Herbert (Cameron Dicker kick), 12:42. Chargers 31–10. **Drive: 12 plays, 73 yards, 6:54.**
- LAC – Cameron Dicker 34-yard field goal, 7:01. Chargers 34–10. **Drive: 7 plays, 36 yards, 4:52.**
- LAC – Cameron Dicker 45-yard field goal, 1:56. Chargers 37–10. **Drive: 7 plays, 9 yards, 4:23.**

**Top passers**

- MIN – Carson Wentz – 15/27, 144 yards, TD, INT
- LAC – Justin Herbert – 18/25, 227 yards, 3 TD, INT

**Top rushers**

- MIN – Zavier Scott – 2 rushes, 16 yards
- LAC – Kimani Vidal – 23 rushes, 117 yards, TD

**Top receivers**

- MIN – Justin Jefferson – 7 receptions, 74 yards
- LAC – Ladd McConkey – 6 receptions, 88 yards, TD

With their second straight loss, the Vikings fell to 3–4 and 2–2 against the AFC. Carson Wentz would suffer a season ending shoulder injury during the game.

==== Week 9: at Detroit Lions ====
Week 9: Minnesota Vikings at Detroit Lions – Game summary

Quarter	1	2	3	4	Total
**Vikings**	14	3	7	3	**27**
Lions	7	7	3	7	**24**

at Ford Field, Detroit, Michigan

- Date: November 2
- Game time: 1:00 p.m. EST/12:00 p.m. CST
- Game weather: None (indoor stadium)
- Game attendance: 64,642
- Referee: Clay Martin (19)
- TV announcers (Fox): Kevin Burkhardt, Tom Brady, Erin Andrews and Tom Rinaldi
- Recap, Game Book

Game information

**First quarter**

- DET – Sam LaPorta 40-yard pass from Jared Goff (Jake Bates kick), 12:37. Lions 7–0. **Drive: 6 plays, 72 yards, 2:23.**
- MIN – Justin Jefferson 10-yard pass from J. J. McCarthy (Will Reichard kick), 10:17. Tied 7–7. **Drive: 5 plays, 36 yards, 2:20.**
- MIN – T. J. Hockenson 7-yard pass from J. J. McCarthy (Will Reichard kick), 4:08. Vikings 14–7. **Drive: 7 plays, 64 yards, 3:40.**

**Second quarter**

- DET – David Montgomery 2-yard run (Jake Bates kick), 9:39. Tied 14–14. **Drive: 9 plays, 35 yards, 4:19.**
- MIN – Will Reichard 50-yard field goal, 4:42. Vikings 17–14. **Drive: 8 plays, 41 yards, 4:57.**

**Third quarter**

- MIN – J. J. McCarthy 9-yard run (Will Reichard kick), 6:04. Vikings 24–14. **Drive: 5 plays, 35 yards, 2:15.**
- DET – Jake Bates 41-yard field goal, 0:11. Vikings 24–17. **Drive: 11 plays, 38 yards, 5:53.**

**Fourth quarter**

- MIN – Will Reichard 20-yard field goal, 3:31. Vikings 27–17. **Drive: 7 plays, 24 yards, 2:49.**
- DET – Jameson Williams 37-yard pass from Jared Goff (Jake Bates kick), 1:55. Vikings 27–24. **Drive: 5 plays, 69 yards, 1:36.**

**Top passers**

- MIN – J. J. McCarthy – 14/25, 143 yards, 2 TD, INT
- DET – Jared Goff – 25/37, 284 yards, 2 TD

**Top rushers**

- MIN – Aaron Jones – 9 rushes, 78 yards
- DET – David Montgomery – 11 rushes, 40 yards, TD

**Top receivers**

- MIN – Jordan Addison – 2 receptions, 48 yards
- DET – Sam LaPorta – 6 receptions, 97 yards, TD

J. J. McCarthy made his return after suffering a high ankle sprain in Week 2 against the Atlanta Falcons. The first-year starting quarterback completed 14-of-25 passes for 143 yards, threw two touchdown passes, ran for a rushing score, and sealed the win with a clutch 16-yard completion to Jalen Nailor on third-and-5 from the Vikings’ 28-yard line, securing an upset win against the Lions. The Vikings improved to 4–4, snapped a five-game losing streak against the Lions dating back to 2022, and won their first game in Detroit since Week 17 of the 2020 season.

==== Week 10: vs. Baltimore Ravens ====
Week 10: Baltimore Ravens at Minnesota Vikings – Game summary

Quarter	1	2	3	4	Total
**Ravens**	3	6	10	8	**27**
Vikings	7	3	3	6	**19**

at U.S. Bank Stadium, Minneapolis, Minnesota

- Date: November 9
- Game time: 12:00 p.m. CST
- Game weather: None (indoor stadium)
- Game attendance: 66,946
- Referee: Shawn Hochuli (83)
- TV announcers (Fox): Kevin Kugler, Daryl Johnston, and Allison Williams
- Recap, Game Book

Game information

**First quarter**

- MIN – Aaron Jones 4-yard run (Will Reichard kick), 9:46. Vikings 7–0. **Drive: 7 plays, 86 yards, 3:27.**
- BAL – Tyler Loop 44-yard field goal, 4:25. Vikings 7–3. **Drive: 11 plays, 42 yards, 5:21.**

**Second quarter**

- MIN – Will Reichard 49-yard field goal, 10:56. Vikings 10–3. **Drive: 7 plays, 26 yards, 3:59.**
- BAL – Tyler Loop 28-yard field goal, 1:11. Vikings 10–6. **Drive: 10 plays, 68 yards, 5:36.**
- BAL – Tyler Loop 30-yard field goal, 0:02. Vikings 10–9. **Drive: 4 plays, 63 yards, 0:28.**

**Third quarter**

- BAL – Tyler Loop 22-yard field goal, 10:19. Ravens 12–10. **Drive: 6 plays, 67 yards, 2:22.**
- BAL – Justice Hill 1-yard run (Tyler Loop kick), 8:02. Ravens 19–10. **Drive: 6 plays, 23 yards, 2:11.**
- MIN – Will Reichard 43-yard field goal, 2:16. Ravens 19–13. **Drive: 7 plays, 29 yards, 2:39.**

**Fourth quarter**

- BAL – Mark Andrews 2-yard pass from Lamar Jackson (Lamar Jackson-Rashod Bateman pass), 10:40. Ravens 27–13. **Drive: 11 plays, 67 yards, 6:36.**
- MIN – Jalen Nailor 10-yard pass from J. J. McCarthy (pass failed), 3:23. Ravens 27–19. **Drive: 9 plays, 65 yards, 2:12.**

**Top passers**

- BAL – Lamar Jackson – 17/29, 176 yards, TD
- MIN – J. J. McCarthy – 20/42, 248 yards, TD, 2 INT

**Top rushers**

- BAL – Derrick Henry – 20 rushes, 75 yards
- MIN – J. J. McCarthy – 5 rushes, 48 yards

**Top receivers**

- BAL – Zay Flowers – 4 receptions, 75 yards
- MIN – Jalen Nailor – 5 receptions, 124 yards, TD

The Vikings played an undisciplined game against the Ravens, with J. J. McCarthy throwing two interceptions, Myles Price fumbling deep in their territory, and the team committing eight false-start penalties, all contributing to their loss.

The Vikings recorded their first home loss to the Ravens in franchise history and their first home defeat against a Baltimore team since losing to the Colts in the 1966 season resulting in them finishing 2–2 against the AFC North and 2–3 against the AFC.

==== Week 11: vs. Chicago Bears ====
Week 11: Chicago Bears at Minnesota Vikings – Game summary

Quarter	1	2	3	4	Total
**Bears**	0	10	6	3	**19**
Vikings	3	0	0	14	**17**

at U.S. Bank Stadium, Minneapolis, Minnesota

- Date: November 16
- Game time: 12:00 p.m. CST
- Game weather: None (indoor stadium)
- Game attendance: 66,952
- Referee: Brad Rogers (126)
- TV announcers (Fox): Kevin Burkhardt, Tom Brady, Erin Andrews and Tom Rinaldi
- Recap, Game Book

Game information

**First quarter**

- MIN – Will Reichard 31-yard field goal, 2:10. Vikings 3–0. **Drive: 8 plays, 47 yards, 4:13.**

**Second quarter**

- CHI – Kyle Monangai 1-yard run (Cairo Santos kick), 4:55. Bears 7–3. **Drive: 15 plays, 74 yards, 8:25.**
- CHI – Cairo Santos 38-yard field goal, 2:00. Bears 10–3. **Drive: 4 plays, 5 yards, 1:34.**

**Third quarter**

- CHI – Cairo Santos 54-yard field goal, 10:31. Bears 13–3. **Drive: 9 plays, 33 yards, 4:29.**
- CHI – Cairo Santos 33-yard field goal, 2:11. Bears 16–3. **Drive: 10 plays, 65 yards, 5:07.**

**Fourth quarter**

- MIN – Jordan Mason 16-yard run (Will Reichard kick), 12:33. Bears 16–10. **Drive: 2 plays, 24 yards, 0:41.**
- MIN – Jordan Addison 15-yard pass from J. J. McCarthy (Will Reichard kick), 0:50. Vikings 17–16. **Drive: 10 plays, 85 yards, 2:24.**
- CHI – Cairo Santos 48-yard field goal, 0:00. Bears 19–17. **Drive: 4 plays, 9 yards, 0:50.**

**Top passers**

- CHI – Caleb Williams – 16/32, 193 yards
- MIN – J. J. McCarthy – 16/32, 150 yards, TD, 2 INT

**Top rushers**

- CHI – D'Andre Swift – 21 rushes, 90 yards
- MIN – Aaron Jones – 16 rushes, 70 yards

**Top receivers**

- CHI – Cole Kmet – 5 receptions, 45 yards
- MIN – Justin Jefferson – 5 receptions, 61 yards

Although the Vikings overcame a 16–3 fourth-quarter deficit and took a one-point lead with 50 seconds remaining, a 56-yard punt return by Bears Devin Duvernay set up Bears kicker Cairo Santos to convert a 48-yard game-winning field goal as time expired, preventing a comeback win by the Vikings.

==== Week 12: at Green Bay Packers ====
Week 12: Minnesota Vikings at Green Bay Packers – Game summary

Quarter	1	2	3	4	Total
Vikings	3	3	0	0	**6**
**Packers**	7	3	7	6	**23**

at Lambeau Field, Green Bay, Wisconsin

- Date: November 23
- Game time: 12:00 p.m. CST
- Game weather: Cloudy, 43 °F (6 °C)
- Game attendance: 77,991
- Referee: Carl Cheffers (51)
- TV announcers (Fox): Joe Davis, Greg Olsen and Pam Oliver
- Recap, Game Book

Game information

**First quarter**

- MIN – Will Reichard 52-yard field goal, 12:53. Vikings 3–0. **Drive: 7 plays, 31 yards, 2:07.**
- GB – Emanuel Wilson 1-yard run (Brandon McManus kick), 9:15. Packers 7–3. **Drive: 7 plays, 70 yards, 3:38.**

**Second quarter**

- GB – Brandon McManus 32-yard field goal, 2:25. Packers 10–3. **Drive: 14 plays, 68 yards, 8:01.**
- MIN – Will Reichard 59-yard field goal, 0:10. Packers 10–6. **Drive: 8 plays, 32 yards, 2:15.**

**Third quarter**

- GB – Emanuel Wilson 1-yard run (Brandon McManus kick), 10:53. Packers 17–6. **Drive: 2 plays, 5 yards, 0:44.**

**Fourth quarter**

- GB – Brandon McManus 30-yard field goal, 12:13. Packers 20–6. **Drive: 8 plays, 43 yards, 4:52.**
- GB – Brandon McManus 40-yard field goal, 7:36. Packers 23–6. **Drive: 5 plays, 19 yards, 2:41.**

**Top passers**

- MIN – J. J. McCarthy – 12/19, 87 yards, 2 INT
- GB – Jordan Love – 14/21, 139 yards

**Top rushers**

- MIN – Jordan Mason – 8 rushes, 42 yards
- GB – Emanuel Wilson – 28 rushes, 107 yards, 2 TD

**Top receivers**

- MIN – Justin Jefferson – 4 receptions, 48 yards
- GB – Christian Watson – 5 receptions, 49 yards

The Vikings' offense was dominated in the second half by the Packers' defense, being held to a total of four net yards and committing three turnovers.

==== Week 13: at Seattle Seahawks ====
Week 13: Minnesota Vikings at Seattle Seahawks – Game summary

Quarter	1	2	3	4	Total
Vikings	0	0	0	0	**0**
**Seahawks**	0	13	6	7	**26**

at Lumen Field, Seattle, Washington

- Date: November 30
- Game time: 1:05 p.m. PST/3:05 p.m. CST
- Game weather: Sunny, 45 °F (7 °C)
- Game attendance: 68,790
- Referee: Clete Blakeman (34)
- TV announcers (Fox): Joe Davis, Greg Olsen and Pam Oliver
- Recap, Game Book

Game information

**First quarter**

- No scoring plays.

**Second quarter**

- SEA – Jason Myers 33-yard field goal, 7:10. Seahawks 3–0. **Drive: 15 plays, 53 yards, 9:16.**
- SEA – Ernest Jones IV 85-yard interception return (Jason Myers kick), 2:59. Seahawks 10–0. **Drive: 4 plays, 9 yards, 2:22.**
- SEA – Jason Myers 56-yard field goal, 0:08. Seahawks 13–0. **Drive: 7 plays, 17 yards, 0:50.**

**Third quarter**

- SEA – Jason Myers 54-yard field goal, 11:14. Seahawks 16–0. **Drive: 8 plays, 44 yards, 3:46.**
- SEA – Jason Myers 40-yard field goal, 3:16. Seahawks 19–0. **Drive: 9 plays, 42 yards, 5:25.**

**Fourth quarter**

- SEA – Zach Charbonnet 17-yard run (Jason Myers kick), 9:11. Seahawks 26–0. **Drive: 6 plays, 32 yards, 3:41.**

**Top passers**

- MIN – Max Brosmer – 19/30, 126 yards, 4 INT
- SEA – Sam Darnold – 14/26, 128 yards

**Top rushers**

- MIN – Jordan Mason – 6 rushes, 47 yards
- SEA – Kenneth Walker III – 13 rushes, 56 yards

**Top receivers**

- MIN – T. J. Hockenson – 6 receptions, 59 yards
- SEA – AJ Barner – 4 receptions, 35 yards

This was the team's first time facing their former quarterback from last year, Sam Darnold, since he signed with the Seahawks in free agency. Max Brosmer got his first NFL start at quarterback due to J. J. McCarthy being in concussion protocol. However, Brosmer struggled mightily, throwing four interceptions against the Seattle defense (including one that was returned 85 yards for a pick-six) and a passer rating of 32.8, the worst by a Vikings starter in a game since Spergon Wynn posted a 23.2 passer rating in a 19–3 loss to the Ravens in their final game of their 2001 season. In the end, the Vikings would fail to score a single point, resulting in their first shutout loss since losing 34–0 to the Green Bay Packers in 2007.

==== Week 14: vs. Washington Commanders ====
Week 14: Washington Commanders at Minnesota Vikings – Game summary

Quarter	1	2	3	4	Total
Commanders	0	0	0	0	**0**
**Vikings**	7	7	10	7	**31**

at U.S. Bank Stadium, Minneapolis, Minnesota

- Date: December 7
- Game time: 12:00 p.m. CST
- Game weather: None (indoor stadium)
- Game attendance: 66,810
- Referee: Brad Allen (122)
- TV announcers (Fox): Adam Amin, Drew Brees and Kristina Pink
- Recap, Game Book

Game information

**First quarter**

- MIN – Josh Oliver 18-yard pass from J. J. McCarthy (Will Reichard kick), 11:03. Vikings 7–0. **Drive: 7 plays, 61 yards, 3:57.**

**Second quarter**

- MIN – Jordan Mason 8-yard run (Will Reichard kick), 5:41. Vikings 14–0. **Drive: 19 plays, 98 yards, 12:01.**

**Third quarter**

- MIN – Will Reichard 45-yard field goal, 7:01. Vikings 17–0. **Drive: 4 plays, 3 yards, 1:15.**
- MIN – Josh Oliver 6-yard pass from J. J. McCarthy (Will Reichard kick), 2:53. Vikings 24–0. **Drive: 4 plays, 37 yards, 2:04.**

**Fourth quarter**

- MIN – T. J. Hockenson 2-yard pass from J. J. McCarthy (Will Reichard kick), 11:26. Vikings 31–0. **Drive: 9 plays, 66 yards, 4:52.**

**Top passers**

- WAS – Jayden Daniels – 9/20, 78 yards, INT
- MIN – J. J. McCarthy – 16/23, 163 yards, 3 TD

**Top rushers**

- WAS – Chris Rodriguez Jr. – 10 rushes, 52 yards
- MIN – Aaron Jones – 14 rushes, 76 yards

**Top receivers**

- WAS – Terry McLaurin – 3 receptions, 41 yards
- MIN – Jordan Addison – 4 receptions, 62 yards

The Vikings recorded their first shutout win since defeating the Las Vegas Raiders 3–0 during the 2023 season. They also became the first team since the 1992 Broncos to be shut out and then shut out an opponent in back-to-back weeks.

==== Week 15: at Dallas Cowboys ====
Week 15: Minnesota Vikings at Dallas Cowboys – Game summary

Quarter	1	2	3	4	Total
**Vikings**	7	10	7	10	**34**
Cowboys	7	10	6	3	**26**

at AT&T Stadium, Arlington, Texas

- Date: December 14
- Game time: 7:20 p.m. CST
- Game weather: None (retractable roof closed)
- Game attendance: 92,991
- Referee: Scott Novak (1)
- TV announcers (NBC): Mike Tirico, Cris Collinsworth and Melissa Stark
- Recap, Game Book

Game information

**First quarter**

- DAL – Javonte Williams 1-yard run (Brandon Aubrey kick), 8:23. Cowboys 7–0. **Drive: 11 plays, 35 yards, 5:39.**
- MIN – Jalen Nailor 20-yard pass from J. J. McCarthy (Will Reichard kick), 2:35. Tied 7–7. **Drive: 2 plays, 53 yards, 0:33.**

**Second quarter**

- DAL – Malik Davis 1-yard run (Brandon Aubrey kick), 14:52. Cowboys 14–7. **Drive: 6 plays, 73 yards, 2:43.**
- MIN – J. J. McCarthy 1-yard run (Will Reichard kick), 9:28. Tied 14–14. **Drive: 10 plays, 75 yards, 5:24.**
- MIN – Will Reichard 29-yard field goal, 1:48. Vikings 17–14. **Drive: 8 plays, 48 yards, 4:03.**
- DAL – Brandon Aubrey 37-yard field goal, 0:03. Tied 17–17. **Drive: 10 plays, 41 yards, 1:45.**

**Third quarter**

- DAL – Brandon Aubrey 26-yard field goal, 11:14. Cowboys 20–17. **Drive: 7 plays, 50 yards, 3:46.**
- DAL – Brandon Aubrey 41-yard field goal, 4:50. Cowboys 23–17. **Drive: 9 plays, 67 yards, 5:20.**
- MIN – C. J. Ham 1-yard run (Will Reichard kick), 1:12. Vikings 24–23. **Drive: 8 plays, 73 yards, 3:38.**

**Fourth quarter**

- MIN – Jalen Nailor 4-yard pass from J. J. McCarthy (Will Reichard kick), 9:12. Vikings 31–23. **Drive: 5 plays, 51 yards, 3:08.**
- MIN – Will Reichard 53-yard field goal, 1:08. Vikings 34–23. **Drive: 10 plays, 26 yards, 4:22.**
- DAL – Brandon Aubrey 41-yard field goal, 0:19. Vikings 34–26. **Drive: 5 plays, 42 yards, 0:49.**

**Top passers**

- MIN – J. J. McCarthy – 15/24, 250 yards, 2 TD, INT
- DAL – Dak Prescott – 23/38, 294 yards

**Top rushers**

- MIN – Aaron Jones – 12 rushes, 34 yards
- DAL – Javonte Williams – 15 rushes, 91 yards, TD

**Top receivers**

- MIN – T. J. Hockenson – 4 receptions, 66 yards
- DAL – CeeDee Lamb – 6 receptions, 111 yards

Hours before kickoff, the Vikings were mathematically eliminated from playoff contention as a result of the Chicago Bears' win over the Cleveland Browns. The Vikings went on to beat the Cowboys 34–26, securing consecutive victories for the first time in the season to improve to 6–8.

==== Week 16: at New York Giants ====
Week 16: Minnesota Vikings at New York Giants – Game summary

Quarter	1	2	3	4	Total
**Vikings**	3	10	0	3	**16**
Giants	0	10	0	3	**13**

at MetLife Stadium, East Rutherford, New Jersey

- Date: December 21
- Game time: 1:00 p.m. EST/12:00 p.m. CST
- Game weather: Fair, 46 °F (8 °C)
- Game attendance: 76,515
- Referee: Alex Moore (49)
- TV announcers (Fox): Kenny Albert, Jonathan Vilma and Megan Olivi
- Recap, Game Book

Game information

**First quarter**

- MIN – Will Reichard 43-yard field goal, 10:49. Vikings 3–0. **Drive: 9 plays, 35 yards, 4:11.**

**Second quarter**

- NYG – Ben Sauls 27-yard field goal, 11:04. Tied 3–3. **Drive: 12 plays, 35 yards, 5:37.**
- MIN – Will Reichard 31-yard field goal, 4:50. Vikings 6–3. **Drive: 11 plays, 64 yards, 6:14.**
- MIN – J. J. McCarthy 12-yard run (Will Reichard kick), 2:01. Vikings 13–3. **Drive: 3 plays, 16 yards, 1:38.**
- NYG – Tyler Nubin 27-yard fumble recovery (Ben Sauls kick), 0:17. Vikings 13–10.

**Third quarter**

- No scoring plays.

**Fourth quarter**

- NYG – Ben Sauls 39-yard field goal, 11:06. Tied 13–13. **Drive: 14 plays, 54 yards, 9:21.**
- MIN – Will Reichard 30-yard field goal, 4:15. Vikings 16–13. **Drive: 14 plays, 57 yards, 6:51.**

**Top passers**

- MIN – J. J. McCarthy – 9/14, 108 yards, INT
- NYG – Jaxson Dart – 7/13, 33 yards, INT

**Top rushers**

- MIN – Aaron Jones – 21 rushes, 85 yards
- NYG – Tyrone Tracy Jr. – 16 rushes, 71 yards

**Top receivers**

- MIN – Justin Jefferson – 6 receptions, 85 yards
- NYG – Wan'Dale Robinson – 3 receptions, 19 yards

With their sixth straight regular season win over the Giants, the Vikings improved to 7–8 and finished 3–1 against the NFC East and 5–4 on the road.

==== Week 17: vs. Detroit Lions ====
Christmas Day games

Week 17: Detroit Lions at Minnesota Vikings – Game summary

Quarter	1	2	3	4	Total
Lions	0	7	0	3	**10**
**Vikings**	7	0	6	10	**23**

at U.S. Bank Stadium, Minneapolis, Minnesota

- Date: December 25
- Game time: 3:30 p.m. CST
- Game weather: None (indoor stadium)
- Game attendance: 66,874
- Referee: Shawn Smith (14)
- TV announcers (WCCO, WWJ, Netflix): Noah Eagle, Drew Brees, AJ Ross and Dianna Russini
  Exclusive to CBS affiliates in Minneapolis-St. Paul and Detroit areas. Out of market, game broadcast on Netflix.
- Recap, Game Book

Game information

**First quarter**

- MIN – Aaron Jones 1-yard run (Will Reichard kick), 1:35. Vikings 7–0. **Drive: 5 plays, 16 yards, 2:07.**

**Second quarter**

- DET – Isaac TeSlaa 4-yard pass from Jared Goff (Jake Bates kick), 1:05. Tied 7–7. **Drive: 19 plays, 80 yards, 10:08.**

**Third quarter**

- MIN – Will Reichard 52-yard field goal, 3:03. Vikings 10–7. **Drive: 9 plays, 28 yards, 4:54.**
- MIN – Will Reichard 56-yard field goal, 1:57. Vikings 13–7. **Drive: 4 plays, 4 yards, 0:55.**

**Fourth quarter**

- DET – Jake Bates 48-yard field goal, 4:39. Vikings 13–10. **Drive: 7 plays, 25 yards, 2:33.**
- MIN – Jordan Addison 65-yard run (Will Reichard kick), 3:43. Vikings 20–10. **Drive: 2 plays, 65 yards, 0:56.**
- MIN – Will Reichard 42-yard field goal, 1:04. Vikings 23–10. **Drive: 7 plays, 21 yards, 2:01.**

**Top passers**

- DET – Jared Goff – 18/29, 197 yards, TD, 2 INT
- MIN – Max Brosmer – 9/16, 51 yards

**Top rushers**

- DET – Jahmyr Gibbs – 17 rushes, 41 yards
- MIN – Jordan Addison – 1 rush, 65 yards, TD

**Top receivers**

- DET – Amon-Ra St. Brown – 8 receptions, 68 yards
- MIN – Justin Jefferson – 4 receptions, 30 yards

Although quarterback Max Brosmer struggled, completing 9-of-16 passes for just three net passing yards, the Lions’ six turnovers and a game-deciding play in which Jordan Addison ran 65 yards for a game-sealing touchdown secured a Vikings victory. With their fourth straight win, the Vikings improved to 8–8 (3–2 against the NFC North) and eliminated the Lions from playoff contention. This was their first sweep against Detroit since 2020.

The most recent time the Vikings forced six or more turnovers without committing one was in 1975, when they recorded eight takeaways in a 38–0 victory over the Atlanta Falcons.

==== Week 18: vs. Green Bay Packers ====
Week 18: Green Bay Packers at Minnesota Vikings – Game summary

Quarter	1	2	3	4	Total
Packers	0	0	0	3	**3**
**Vikings**	3	10	0	3	**16**

at U.S. Bank Stadium, Minneapolis, Minnesota

- Date: January 4
- Game time: 12:00 p.m. CST
- Game weather: None (indoor stadium)
- Game attendance: 66,606
- Referee: John Hussey (35)
- TV announcers (CBS): Spero Dedes, Adam Archuleta and Aditi Kinkhabwala
- Recap, Game Book

Game information

**First quarter**

- MIN – Will Reichard 43-yard field goal, 10:27. Vikings 3–0. **Drive: 8 plays, 46 yards, 4:33.**

**Second quarter**

- MIN – Will Reichard 25-yard field goal, 3:02. Vikings 6–0. **Drive: 14 plays, 84 yards, 6:02.**
- MIN – C. J. Ham 1-yard run (Will Reichard kick), 0:23. Vikings 13–0. **Drive: 9 plays, 59 yards, 1:24.**

**Third quarter**

- No scoring plays.

**Fourth quarter**

- MIN – Will Reichard 37-yard field goal, 4:09. Vikings 16–0. **Drive: 10 plays, 63 yards, 5:35.**
- GB – Brandon McManus 24-yard field goal, 0:00. Vikings 16–3. **Drive: 13 plays, 56 yards, 4:09.**

**Top passers**

- GB – Clayton Tune – 6/11, 34 yards
- MIN – J. J. McCarthy – 14/23, 182 yards

**Top rushers**

- GB – Chris Brooks – 13 rushes, 61 yards
- MIN – Jordan Mason – 14 rushes, 94 yards

**Top receivers**

- GB – Jakobie Keeney-James – 2 receptions, 15 yards
- MIN – Justin Jefferson – 8 receptions, 101 yards

With the win, the Vikings finished their season at 9–8 (4–2 against the NFC North) and 4–4 at home.

=== Standings ===
==== Division ====
NFC North
	W	L	T	PCT	DIV	CONF	PF	PA	STK
^{(2)} Chicago Bears	11	6	0	.647	2–4	7–5	441	415	L2
^{(7)} Green Bay Packers	9	7	1	.559	4–2	7–4–1	391	360	L4
Minnesota Vikings	9	8	0	.529	4–2	7–5	344	333	W5
Detroit Lions	9	8	0	.529	2–4	6–6	481	413	W1

==== Conference ====
NFC
Seed	Team	Division	W	L	T	PCT	DIV	CONF	SOS	SOV	STK
**Division leaders**
1	Seattle Seahawks	West	14	3	0	.824	4–2	9–3	.498	.471	W7
2 (Note: Chicago finished ahead of Philadelphia based on head-to-head victory.)	Chicago Bears	North	11	6	0	.647	2–4	7–5	.458	.406	L2
3	Philadelphia Eagles	East	11	6	0	.647	3–3	8–4	.476	.455	L1
4 (Note: Carolina finished ahead of Tampa Bay and Atlanta based on head-to-head record (Carolina 3–1 to Tampa Bay 2–2 and Atlanta 1–3).)	Carolina Panthers	South	8	9	0	.471	3–3	6–6	.522	.463	L2
**Wild cards**
5 (Note: LA Rams finished ahead of San Francisco based on common games (LA Rams 9–3 to San Francisco 8–4 against: Arizona, Atlanta, Carolina, Houston, Indianapolis, Jacksonville, New Orleans, Seattle, Tampa Bay and Tennessee).)	Los Angeles Rams	West	12	5	0	.706	4–2	7–5	.526	.485	W1
6	San Francisco 49ers	West	12	5	0	.706	4–2	9–3	.498	.417	L1
7	Green Bay Packers	North	9	7	1	.559	4–2	7–4–1	.483	.431	L4
**Did not qualify for the postseason**
8 (Note: Minnesota finished ahead of Detroit based on head-to-head sweep.)	Minnesota Vikings	North	9	8	0	.529	4–2	7–5	.514	.431	W5
9	Detroit Lions	North	9	8	0	.529	2–4	6–6	.490	.428	W1
10 (Note: Tampa Bay finished ahead of Atlanta based on common games (Tampa Bay 6–6 to Atlanta 5–7 against: Arizona, Buffalo, Carolina, LA Rams, Miami, New England, New Orleans, NY Jets, San Francisco and Seattle).)	Tampa Bay Buccaneers	South	8	9	0	.471	3–3	6–6	.529	.485	W1
11	Atlanta Falcons	South	8	9	0	.471	3–3	7–5	.495	.449	W4
12	Dallas Cowboys	East	7	9	1	.441	4–2	4–7–1	.438	.311	L1
13	New Orleans Saints	South	6	11	0	.353	3–3	4–8	.495	.333	L1
14	Washington Commanders	East	5	12	0	.294	3–3	3–9	.507	.388	W1
15	New York Giants	East	4	13	0	.235	2–4	2–10	.524	.478	W2
16	Arizona Cardinals	West	3	14	0	.176	0–6	3–9	.571	.422	L9
**Tiebreakers** (Note: When breaking ties for three or more teams under the NFL's rules, they are first broken within divisions, then comparing only the highest ranked remaining team from each division.)

== Statistics ==
=== Team leaders ===
Category	Player(s)	Total
Passing yards	J. J. McCarthy	1,632
Passing touchdowns	J. J. McCarthy	11
Rushing yards	Jordan Mason	758
Rushing touchdowns	Jordan Mason	6
Receptions	Justin Jefferson	84
Receiving yards	Justin Jefferson	1,048
Receiving touchdowns	Jalen Nailor; Josh Oliver	4
Points	Will Reichard	130
Kickoff return yards	Myles Price	1,479
Punt return yards	Myles Price	298
Tackles	Blake Cashman	144
Sacks	Dallas Turner	8.0
Interceptions	Josh Metellus; Byron Murphy; Harrison Smith	2
Forced fumbles	Dallas Turner; Eric Wilson	4

Source: Pro-Football-Reference.com

=== League rankings ===
Category	Total yards	Yards per game	NFL rank (out of 32)
Passing offense	2,834	166.7	29th
Rushing offense	1,841	108.3	23rd
Total offense	4,675	275.0	28th
Passing defense	2,694	158.5	2nd
Rushing defense	2,110	124.1	21st
Total defense	4,804	282.6	3rd

Source: ProFootballReference.com
