= Max Brosmer =

American football player (born 2001)

- Brosmer in 2026

No. 12 – Minnesota Vikings
- Position: Quarterback
- Roster status: Active

Personal information
- Born: March 28, 2001 (age 25); Davenport, Iowa, U.S.
- Listed height: 6 ft 2 in (1.88 m)
- Listed weight: 218 lb (99 kg)

Career information
- High school: Centennial (Roswell, Georgia)
- College: New Hampshire (2019–2023); Minnesota (2024)
- NFL draft: 2025: undrafted

Career history
- Minnesota Vikings (2025–present)

Awards and highlights
- First-team FCS All-American (2023); First-team All-CAA (2023)

Career NFL statistics as of Week 10, 2026
- Passing attempts: 78
- Passing completions: 53
- Completion percentage: 67.9%
- TD–INT: 0–4
- Passing yards: 386
- Passer rating: 58.0
- Rushing yards: 11
- Stats at Pro Football Reference

Thomas Maxwell Brosmer (/ˈbroʊzmər/ BROHZ-mər; born March 28, 2001) is an American professional football quarterback for the Minnesota Vikings of the National Football League (NFL). He played college football for the New Hampshire Wildcats and Minnesota Golden Gophers.

== Early life ==
Brosmer was born in Davenport, Iowa and after living for a while in Toronto, he moved to Roswell, Georgia in middle school. He attended Roswell's Centennial High School.

== College career ==
Brosmer was named the New Hampshire Wildcats' starting quarterback entering his true freshman season. He completed 183 of 311 pass attempts for 1,967 yards with 16 touchdowns and 12 interceptions. UNH played one game during Brosmer's true sophomore season, which was postponed from late 2020 to the spring of 2021 due to the COVID-19 pandemic. He tore his ACL during preseason practices the following year and missed the entire season as a medical redshirt. Brosmer passed for 3,157 yards with 27 touchdowns with eight interceptions as a redshirt junior. As a senior, he led the NCAA Division I Football Championship Subdivision with 3,464 passing yards and had 29 passing touchdowns. After the season, he entered the NCAA transfer portal and utilized the extra year of eligibility granted to college athletes who played in the 2020 season due to the coronavirus pandemic.

Brosmer ultimately transferred to Minnesota.

=== Statistics ===
Season	Team	Games			Passing								Rushing			
Season	Team	GP	GS	Record	Cmp	Att	Pct	Yds	Avg	TD	Int	Rtg	Att	Yds	Avg	TD
2019	New Hampshire	11	10	6−4	183	311	58.8	1,967	6.3	12	12	117.0	55	28	0.5	3
2020	New Hampshire	1	1	0−1	20	35	57.1	128	3.7	2	0	106.7	4	-8	-2.0	0
2021	New Hampshire	0	0	—	Medical (redshirt)											
2022	New Hampshire	13	13	9−4	263	420	62.6	3,154	7.5	27	8	143.1	75	117	1.6	2
2023	New Hampshire	11	11	6−5	294	459	64.0	3,464	7.5	29	5	146.1	57	126	2.2	5
2024	Minnesota	12	12	7−5	250	374	66.8	2,617	7.0	17	5	137.9	67	-34	-0.5	5
Career		48	47	28−19	1,010	1,599	63.2	11,330	7.1	87	30	136.9	258	229	0.9	15

== Professional career ==
Pre-draft measurables
Height	Weight	Arm length	Hand span	Wingspan	40-yard dash	10-yard split	20-yard split
6 ft 1 5/8 in (1.87 m)	217 lb (98 kg)	31 1/4 in (0.79 m)	9 1/2 in (0.24 m)	6 ft 3 1/2 in (1.92 m)	4.79 s	1.70 s	2.78 s
All values from NFL Combine/Pro Day

=== Minnesota Vikings ===
Brosmer signed with the Minnesota Vikings as an undrafted free agent on April 26, 2025. After a successful preseason, Brosmer made the initial 53-man roster on August 26. He was one of the seven undrafted free agents that made the Vikings roster.

Brosmer made his first regular season appearance on September 21, against the Cincinnati Bengals. Brosmer went 2-for-4 for 29 yards becoming the first starting quarterback from the University of Minnesota to play quarterback in the NFL since 2002, and the first University of New Hampshire quarterback to ever take a snap in the NFL.

With starter J. J. McCarthy suffering a concussion in Week 12 and in concussion protocol, Vikings announced that Brosmer would start his first NFL game on November 30, against the Seattle Seahawks. Brosmer went 19-for-30 for 126 yards and four interceptions in a 26–0 loss, the first time the Vikings were shut out since 2007.

Following McCarthy's right hand injury in Week 16, Brosmer was named the starter against the Detroit Lions in the Week 17 matchup. In his second career start, Brosmer made history as the only quarterback in the Super Bowl era to throw fewer than 70 passing yards, be sacked seven or more times, and still win the game. He then relieved McCarthy in the season's last game against the Green Bay Packers and fared better, throwing for 57 yards and being sacked only twice in another Viking win.

Brosmer was named to the Viking's 53-man roster for the 2026 season on August 30, 2026, but he was released the following day. He was re-signed to the Vikings' practice squad on September 1. On September 29, Brosmer was signed to the active roster after the Vikings traded away J. J. McCarthy to the New York Giants. In Week 9, Brosmer came in relief for Carson Wentz midway through the fourth quarter; he went 6-for-7 for 58 yards, with the game ending in a 23–6 loss for Minnesota.

=== Regular season ===
Year	Team	Games			Passing									Rushing					Sacks		Fumbles	
Year	Team	GP	GS	Record	Cmp	Att	Pct	Yds	Y/A	Lng	TD	Int	Rtg	Att	Yds	Avg	Lng	TD	Sck	SckY	Fum	Lost
2025	MIN	7	2	1–1	47	71	66.2	328	4.6	29	0	4	53.0	7	11	1.6	11	0	14	100	2	1
2026	MIN	1	0	0-0	6	7	85.7	58	8.3	19	0	0	101.2	0	0	0	0	0	1	0	0	
Career		7	2	1–1	53	78	67.9	386	4.9	29	0	4	58.0	7	11	1.6	11	0	15	106	2	1
