= Zavier Scott =

American football player (born 1999)

No. 30 – Chicago Bears
- Position: Running back
- Roster status: Injured reserve

Personal information
- Born: July 17, 1999 (age 27); Fort Hood, Texas, U.S.
- Listed height: 6 ft 1 in (1.85 m)
- Listed weight: 221 lb (100 kg)

Career information
- High school: Vilseck (Vilseck, Germany)
- College: UConn (2017–2019); Maine (2020–2022)
- NFL draft: 2023: undrafted

Career history
- Indianapolis Colts (2023)*; Minnesota Vikings (2024–2025); Chicago Bears (2026–present)
- * Offseason or practice squad member only

Awards and highlights
- Third-team All-CAA (2022)

Career NFL statistics as of 2026
- Rushing yards: 114
- Rushing average: 3.6
- Receptions: 14
- Receiving yards: 98
- Receiving touchdowns: 1
- Stats at Pro Football Reference

Zavier Scott (born July 17, 1999) is an American professional football running back for the Chicago Bears of the National Football League (NFL). He played college football for the UConn Huskies and Maine Black Bears.

== Early life ==
Scott was born July 17, 1999, at the United States Army base Fort Hood in Texas. His father served in the Army, and the family moved several times during Scott's childhood, including to Tennessee, Kentucky, Virginia, and Germany. While attending Vilseck High School in Vilseck, Germany, Scott had the opportunity to play American football against U.S. military base teams across Europe.

== College career ==
Scott played college football for the Connecticut Huskies in 2017; he redshirted his freshman season. Playing both running back and wide receiver, he played in ten games in 2018 and four games in 2019.

Scott transferred to play for the Maine Black Bears starting with the 2020 season, which took place in spring of 2021 due to the COVID-19 pandemic, playing in two games that season. He played in 11 games in both 2021 and 2022. While playing running back and wide receiver, Scott was also a kick returner at Maine, and additionally took snaps at tight end and as a quarterback in the Wildcat formation. In 2022, he was named third-team all-Colonial Athletic Association Football Conference as a fullback/halfback.

== Professional career ==
Pre-draft measurables
Height	Weight	Arm length	Hand span	Wingspan	40-yard dash	20-yard shuttle	Three-cone drill	Vertical jump	Broad jump	Bench press
6 ft 0 3/4 in (1.85 m)	219 lb (99 kg)	31 in (0.79 m)	10 1/8 in (0.26 m)	6 ft 4 in (1.93 m)	4.50 s	4.11 s	7.04 s	37.5 in (0.95 m)	10 ft 0 in (3.05 m)	16 reps
All values from Pro Day

=== Indianapolis Colts ===
After going unselected in the 2023 NFL draft, Scott signed with the Indianapolis Colts on April 29, 2023. He signed to the Colts' practice squad on October 17. On November 12, the Colts defeated the New England Patriots in the team's first-ever game played in Germany, where Scott graduated from high school; Germany native Marcel Dabo, who played safety for the Colts, was present for the game as well.

Scott signed a reserve/futures contract with the Colts on January 8, 2024. He was waived by Indianapolis as a part of final roster cuts on August 27.

=== Minnesota Vikings ===
On August 29, 2024, Scott signed with the Minnesota Vikings' practice squad. He signed a reserve/future contract with Minnesota on January 16, 2025. Scott earned a place on the Vikings' 53-man roster after the preseason, signing a one-year, $840,000 contract and becoming one of two former Maine Black Bears players on active NFL rosters. In 2025, he played on special teams and in a reserve role behind Aaron Jones and Jordan Mason.

On March 9, 2026, Scott re-signed with the Vikings. He was waived by Minnesota as a part of final roster cuts on August 30.

=== Chicago Bears ===
On September 1, 2026, Scott was signed to the Chicago Bears' practice squad. He was elevated to the active roster for Weeks 5–7. Scott played on special teams, forcing a fumble on Zachariah Branch's kickoff return in Week 6. He reverted to their practice squad on October 23. Since the Bears had exhausted his three activations, meaning he would be exposed to the waiver wire before he could be elevated again, he was signed to the active roster on October 27. On November 5, Scott was placed on injured reserve for a thumb injury.

== NFL career statistics ==
Year	Team	Games		Rushing						Receiving					Fumbles	
Year	Team	GP	GS	Att	Yds	Avg	Y/G	Lng	TD	Rec	Yds	Avg	Lng	TD	Fum	Lost
2025	MIN	16	0	32	114	3.6	7.1	11	0	14	98	7.0	20	1	2	1
Total		16	0	32	114	3.6	7.1	11	0	14	98	7.0	20	1	2	1

== Personal life ==
Scott married sprint car driver McKenna Haase in March 2025.
