= Theo Jackson (American football) =

American football player (born 1998)

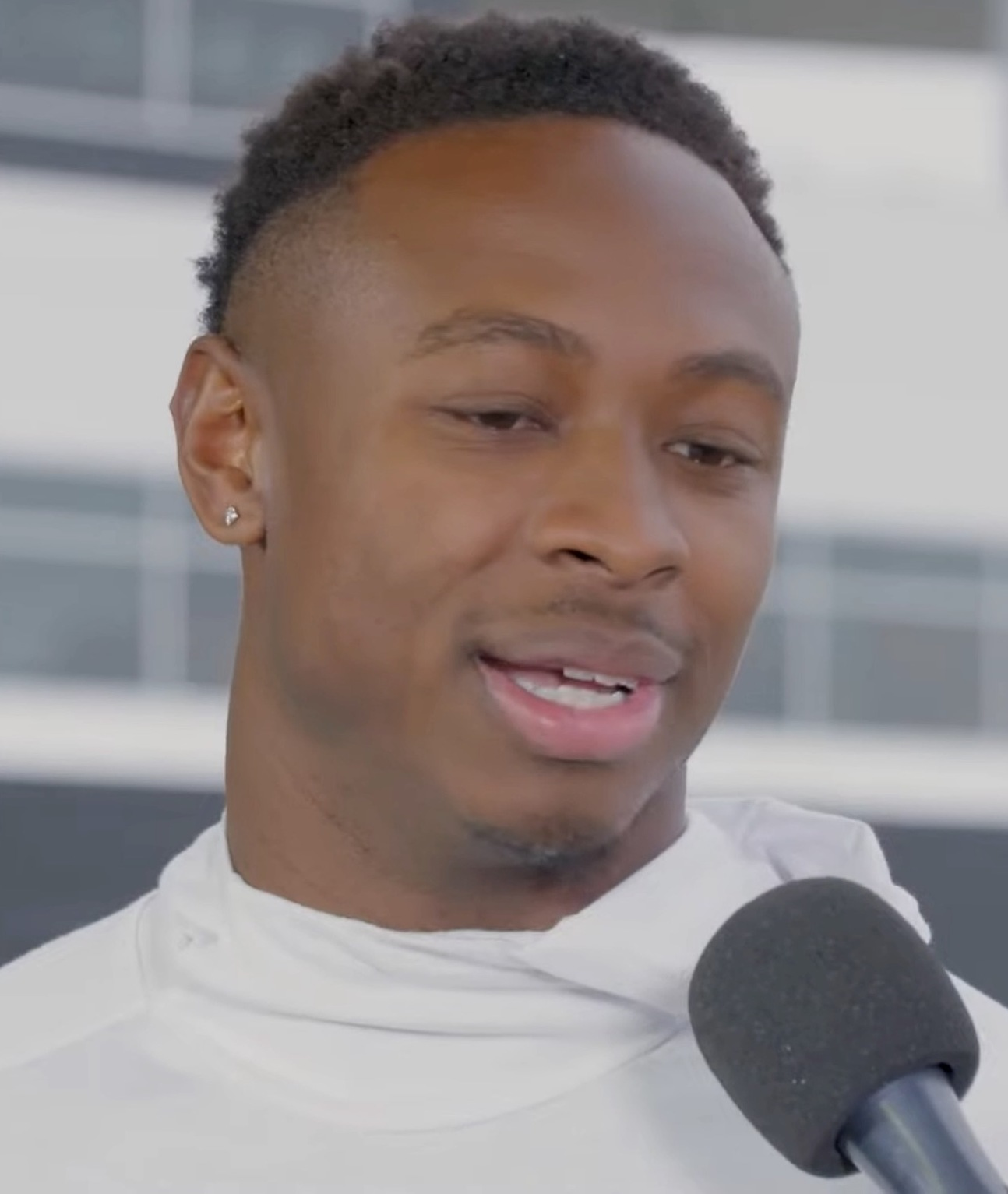
- Jackson in 2022

No. 26 – Minnesota Vikings
- Position: Safety
- Roster status: Active

Personal information
- Born: October 2, 1998 (age 28); Nashville, Tennessee, U.S.
- Listed height: 6 ft 1 in (1.85 m)
- Listed weight: 205 lb (93 kg)

Career information
- High school: Overton (Nashville)
- College: Tennessee (2017–2021)
- NFL draft: 2022: 6th round, 204th overall pick

Career history
- Tennessee Titans (2022)*; Minnesota Vikings (2022–present)
- * Offseason or practice squad member only

Awards and highlights
- Second-team All-SEC (2021)

Career NFL statistics as of Week 10, 2026
- Total tackles: 119
- Interceptions: 2
- Pass deflections: 6
- Forced fumbles: 1
- Fumble recoveries: 2
- Sacks: 2.0
- Stats at Pro Football Reference

Thedarrius Jackson (born October 2, 1998) is an American professional football safety for the Minnesota Vikings of the National Football League (NFL). He played college football for the Tennessee Volunteers.

== Early life ==
Jackson was born on October 2, 1998. He was raised in Brentwood, Tennessee. He played on youth teams coached by his father Nate Foster who formerly played college football for Western Kentucky.

Jackson played high school football at Overton where he earned several accolades during the 2016 season. He was rated a three-star recruit and top-25 prospect in Tennessee. On February 1, 2017, Jackson signed a letter of intent to the University of Tennessee.

== College career ==
Jackson played five seasons (2017–2021) for the University of Tennessee, as a member of the Volunteers football team. He played under head coaches Butch Jones, Jeremy Pruitt, and Josh Heupel. He started 24 of 56 games and recorded 190 career tackles. He earned an undergraduate degree in communications. He earned Second Team All-Southeastern honors for 2021.

== Professional career ==
Pre-draft measurables
Height	Weight	Arm length	Hand span	Wingspan	40-yard dash	10-yard split	20-yard split	20-yard shuttle	Three-cone drill	Vertical jump	Broad jump	Bench press
6 ft 0 7/8 in (1.85 m)	198 lb (90 kg)	32 3/4 in (0.83 m)	9 3/8 in (0.24 m)	6 ft 4 in (1.93 m)	4.46 s	1.54 s	2.59 s	4.25 s	7.34 s	37.0 in (0.94 m)	10 ft 3 in (3.12 m)	12 reps
All values from Pro Day

=== Tennessee Titans ===
Jackson was selected by the Tennessee Titans in the sixth round, 204th overall, of the 2022 NFL draft. He was waived on August 30, 2022, and signed to the practice squad the next day.

=== Minnesota Vikings ===
On October 11, 2022, Jackson was signed off the Titans' practice squad by the Minnesota Vikings, who were in need of safety depth after a season-ending injury to Lewis Cine. As a rookie, he appeared in 11 games in the 2022 season.

In Week 2 of the 2023 season, Jackson recorded his first professional interception against the Philadelphia Eagles. He appeared in 15 games in the 2023 season.

Against the Seattle Seahawks in Week 16 of the 2024 season, Jackson recorded his second career interception against Geno Smith after filling in for Harrison Smith.

On March 6, 2025, Jackson and the Vikings agreed to a two-year, $12.65 million contract extension.

== NFL career statistics ==
Legend
**Bold**	Career high

=== Regular season ===
Year	Team	Games		Tackles					Interceptions						Fumbles				
Year	Team	GP	GS	Cmb	Solo	Ast	Sck	TFL	Int	Yds	Avg	Lng	TD	PD	FF	Fmb	FR	Yds	TD
2022	MIN	11	0	9	4	5	0.0	0	0	0	0.0	0	0	0	0	0	**1**	0	0
2023	MIN	15	0	21	14	7	0.0	0	**1**	0	0.0	0	0	1	0	0	0	0	0
2024	MIN	17	0	17	11	6	0.0	0	**1**	**3**	**3.0**	**3**	0	**3**	0	0	0	0	0
2025	MIN	14	8	**47**	**22**	**25**	**2.0**	**3**	0	0	0.0	0	0	1	**1**	0	**1**	0	0
Career		57	8	94	51	43	2.0	3	2	3	1.5	3	0	5	1	0	2	0	0

=== Postseason ===
Year	Team	Games		Tackles					Interceptions						Fumbles				
Year	Team	GP	GS	Cmb	Solo	Ast	Sck	TFL	Int	Yds	Avg	Lng	TD	PD	FF	Fmb	FR	Yds	TD
2022	MIN	1	0	**1**	**1**	0	0.0	0	0	0	0.0	0	0	0	0	0	0	0	0
2024	MIN	1	0	0	0	0	0.0	0	0	0	0.0	0	0	0	0	0	0	0	0
Career		2	0	1	1	0	0.0	0	0	0	0.0	0	0	0	0	0	0	0	0
