= Oscar Chapman (gridiron football) =

Australian-born American football player (born 1999)

Saskatchewan Roughriders
- Position: Punter
- Roster status: Active
- CFL status: Global

Personal information
- Born: 28 March 1999 (age 27); Adelaide, Australia
- Listed height: 6 ft 3 in (1.91 m)
- Listed weight: 211 lb (96 kg)

Career information
- High school: Prince Alfred College
- College: Auburn (2020–2024)
- NFL draft: 2025: undrafted

Career history
- Minnesota Vikings (2025)*; Saskatchewan Roughriders (2026–present)
- * Offseason or practice squad member only
- Stats at CFL.ca

Oscar Chapman (born 28 March 1999) is an Australian professional gridiron football punter for the Saskatchewan Roughriders of the Canadian Football League (CFL). He played college football for the Auburn Tigers.

== Early life ==
Chapman attended Prince Alfred College in Kent Town, South Australia, after which he played semi-professionally in the South Australian National Football League. He went on to attend Prokick Academy and committed to play college football for the Auburn Tigers.

== College career ==
As a freshman in 2020, Chapman punted 28 times with an average of 41.1 yards per punt and earned SEC first-year Academic Honor Roll honors. In 2021, he punted 57 times with an averaged of 44.12 yards per punt while landing 23 of his punts inside the opponent’s 20-yard line. Heading into the 2022 season, Chapman was named to the Ray Guy Award watchlist and preseason second-team all-SEC. In week 4 of the 2022 season, he punted eight times, with a long of 61 yards, and three punts inside Missouri's 20-yard line in a 17-14 overtime win over the Tigers. In the 2022 season, Chapman punted 56 times with an average of 43.7 yards per punt. In week 5 of the 2023 season, he was named the Ray Guy Award Punter of the Week after punting five times for an average of 50 yards, with three inside the 20-yard line, and a long of 71 yards in a 27-20 loss to #1 Georgia. During his final two collegiate seasons in 2023 and 2024, Chapman combined to punt 102 times with an average of 43.7 yards per punt.

== Professional career ==
Pre-draft measurables
Height	Weight	Arm length	Hand span	Wingspan
6 ft 3 1/4 in (1.91 m)	206 lb (93 kg)	31 1/8 in (0.79 m)	8 7/8 in (0.23 m)	6 ft 3 7/8 in (1.93 m)
All values from Pro Day

After not being selected in the 2025 NFL draft, Chapman signed with the Minnesota Vikings as a undrafted free agent. He was waived on August 25.
