= J. J. McCarthy =

American football player (born 2003)

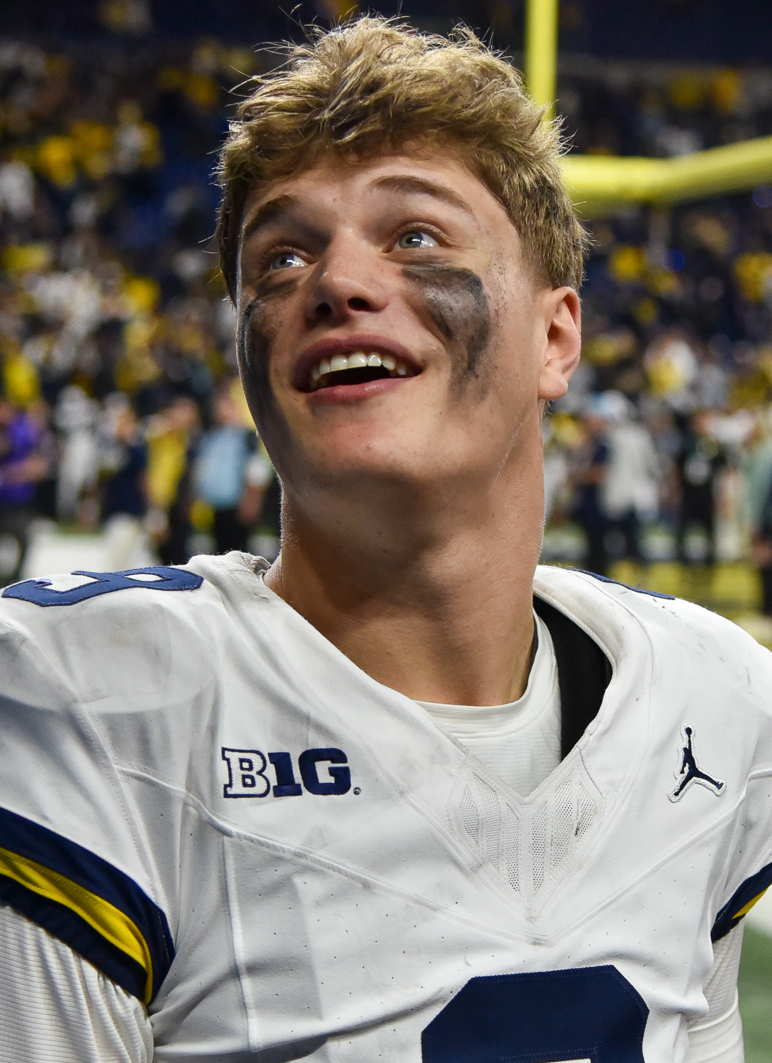
- McCarthy with the Michigan Wolverines in 2023

No. 18 – New York Giants
- Position: Quarterback
- Roster status: Active

Personal information
- Born: January 20, 2003 (age 23); Evanston, Illinois, U.S.
- Listed height: 6 ft 3 in (1.91 m)
- Listed weight: 219 lb (99 kg)

Career information
- High school: IMG Academy (Bradenton, Florida)
- College: Michigan (2021–2023)
- NFL draft: 2024: 1st round, 10th overall pick

Career history
- Minnesota Vikings (2024–2026); New York Giants (2026–present)

Awards and highlights
- CFP national champion (2023); Rose Bowl Offensive MVP (2024); Big Ten Quarterback of the Year (2023); First-team All-Big Ten (2023); Second-team All-Big Ten (2022)

Career NFL statistics as of Week 10, 2026
- Passing attempts: 347
- Passing completions: 206
- Completion percentage: 59.4%
- TD–INT: 13–14
- Passing yards: 2,547
- Passer rating: 77.8
- Rushing yards: 266
- Rushing touchdowns: 4
- Stats at Pro Football Reference

Jonathan James McCarthy (born January 20, 2003) is an American professional football quarterback for the New York Giants of the National Football League (NFL). He played college football for the Michigan Wolverines, earning Big Ten Quarterback of the Year honors and leading the team to a 15–0 record and a national championship in 2023, the program's first since 1997. In his three years at Michigan, the Wolverines won three Big Ten titles and made three College Football Playoff semifinal appearances. McCarthy finished with a 27–1 record (.964) in two seasons as a starting quarterback, the highest career winning percentage in NCAA Division I Football Bowl Subdivision (FBS) history.

McCarthy was selected 10th overall by the Minnesota Vikings in the 2024 NFL draft. After missing his entire rookie season due to injury, he served as the team's primary starter in 2025. Due to inconsistent play and injuries, McCarthy lost his starting position with the Vikings in 2026 before being traded to the Giants.

== Early life ==
Born in Evanston, Illinois, McCarthy grew up in La Grange Park, a southwest suburb of Chicago. He attended Nazareth Academy for high school before transferring to IMG Academy in Bradenton, Florida, as a senior in 2020, following the COVID-19 pandemic that led to the cancellation of Nazareth's football season. In two seasons as the starting quarterback at Nazareth, McCarthy led his team to a 26–2 record with consecutive appearances in the IHSA Class 7A state championship game, winning the state title as a sophomore in 2018. In his lone season at IMG, McCarthy led his team to an 8–0 record and a consensus high school football national championship.

McCarthy was a five-star recruit in the 247Sports composite rankings, which uses the ratings of each major recruiting website. At age 16, McCarthy said that Ryan Day "lied to my face" by telling him in March that Ohio State would not take a quarterback in the 2021 recruiting class until the end of the summer, but then accepted a commitment from Kyle McCord in April. Despite growing up an Ohio State fan, McCarthy committed to rival Michigan the next month over offers from 24 other schools, including Ohio State. Speaking about his new hatred of Ohio State, McCarthy said, "I used to love them. Now I want to kill them."

McCarthy played hockey growing up and said that it was actually his first love, not football. Around his freshman year of high school, McCarthy made the decision to give up hockey in order to focus on football. He called it "one of the hardest decisions I ever had to make." In the eighth grade, McCarthy received a scholarship offer to play football at Iowa State from head coach Matt Campbell. In May 2019, McCarthy committed to play college football for head coach Jim Harbaugh and the Michigan Wolverines.

== College career ==
=== 2021 season ===
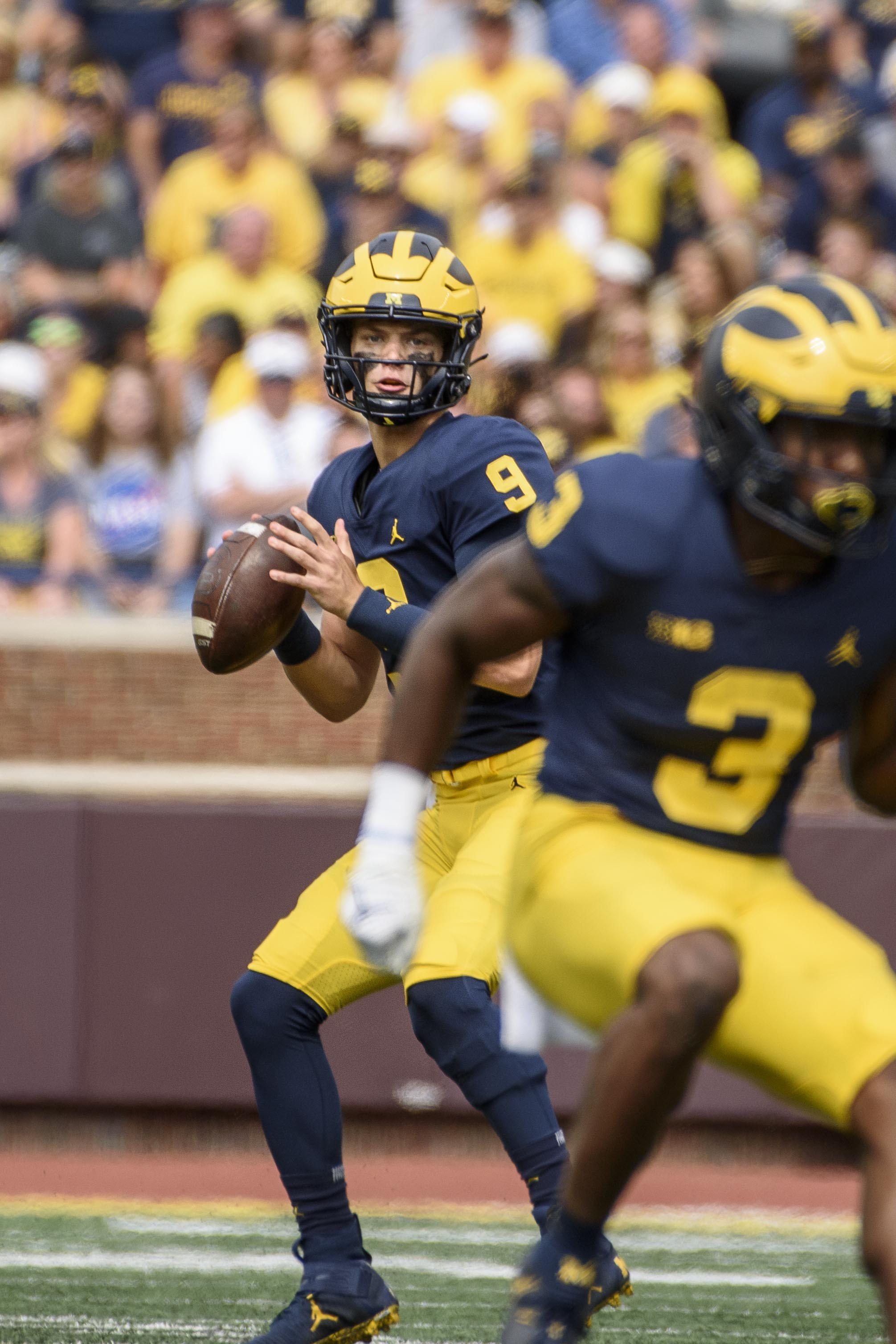
McCarthy in his first collegiate game with Michigan in 2021

McCarthy enrolled at the University of Michigan in 2021. He appeared in 11 games for the Wolverines during the 2021 season, primarily as a rotational backup behind Cade McNamara. McCarthy completed 34 of 59 passes for 516 yards, with five passing touchdowns and two interceptions while also rushing for 124 yards and two touchdowns.

On September 4, 2021, McCarthy made his debut against Western Michigan, completing four of six passes for 80 yards, including his first collegiate touchdown pass, a 69-yard reception by Daylen Baldwin. Against Wisconsin, McCarthy scored his first collegiate rushing touchdown to go up 20–10 in the middle of the third quarter, also connecting with Baldwin late in the game for a 56-yard touchdown in a 38–17 victory. McCarthy again scored two touchdowns versus Maryland in week 11.

In the final game of the regular season against Ohio State, McCarthy helped Michigan defeat the Buckeyes to advance to the 2021 Big Ten Championship. He entered the game midway through the third quarter in a pivotal drive and completed a 31-yard pass to Roman Wilson. Two plays later, McCarthy had a key six-yard run to the one-yard line, and Hassan Haskins bookended it with a touchdown run for a 28–13 Michigan lead. Michigan went on to beat the Buckeyes 42–27, and won a Big Ten title the next week versus Iowa, Michigan's first conference title since 2004.

In the Orange Bowl (CFP semifinal), against the eventual national champion Georgia Bulldogs, McCarthy replaced Cade McNamara in the second half after McNamara fumbled, having already thrown two interceptions and not scoring a touchdown with the offense. McCarthy provided an immediate spark, throwing a touchdown and accounting for 137 yards after taking over for the final 16 minutes of game time (fourth quarter plus one minute). This game started a quarterback competition leading into the next season, with many across college football and inside the program believing given both their performances in the Orange Bowl, and McCarthy's pedigree, that McCarthy would be the starting quarterback in 2022.

=== 2022 season ===
Prior to the 2022 season, McCarthy competed with Cade McNamara for the role as Michigan's starting quarterback. Before the opening game, Michigan head coach Jim Harbaugh announced that the competition was close and would continue at least for the first two games, with McNamara starting in the first week against Colorado State and McCarthy starting in the second week against Hawaii.

McCarthy started and played most of the first half against Hawaii, completing 11-of-12 passes for 229 yards and three touchdowns while leading the Wolverines to a 42–0 halftime lead. In his postgame press conference, Harbaugh announced that McCarthy would start against UConn in week 3 and added, "He's the starter moving forward on merit."

McCarthy continued as Michigan's starting quarterback, completing 15-of-18 passes against UConn for 214 yards, 18-of-26 passes against Maryland for 220 yards, and 18-of-24 passes against Iowa for 155 yards. Against Indiana on October 8, he completed 28-of-36 passes for 304 yards, three touchdowns, and an interception (on a tipped ball in the end zone). To start November, McCarthy again had a three touchdown performance against Nebraska and Rutgers in consecutive weeks, two passing and one rushing touchdown in each contest.

McCarthy helped lead the Wolverines into an undefeated matchup with the Buckeyes on November 26. He passed for 263 yards and three touchdowns, including 75 and 69 yard scores by Cornelius Johnson and a 45-yard grab by Colston Loveland. McCarthy also scored a rushing touchdown in the 45–23 victory over Ohio State.

In the 2022 Big Ten Championship, McCarthy threw for 161 yards and three touchdowns to three different receivers, Ronnie Bell, Luke Schoonmaker and Colston Loveland, leading the Wolverines to a 43–22 victory versus Purdue, and Michigan's second straight Big Ten title.

During the Fiesta Bowl, McCarthy completed 20-of-34 passes for a career-high 343 yards with two touchdowns and two interceptions, both returned for touchdowns, in the 51–45 loss to TCU in the College Football Playoff (CFP) semifinals. He also had 52 yards rushing and a score.

For the 2022 season, McCarthy completed 208-of-322 passes for 2,719 yards, 22 touchdowns, and five interceptions for a 155.0 quarterback rating to go along with 70 carries for 306 yards and five touchdowns.

=== 2023 season ===
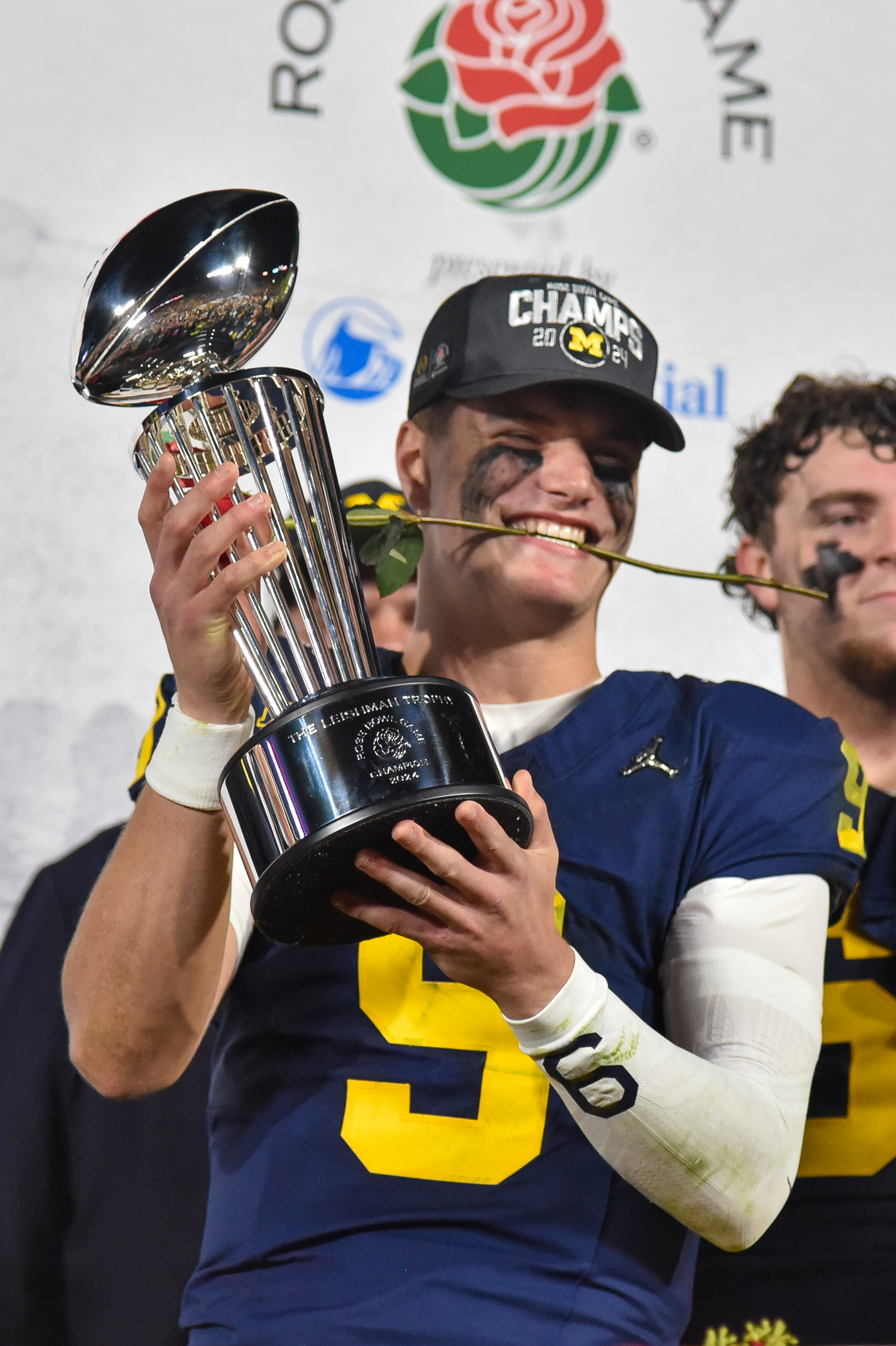
McCarthy was named offensive MVP of the 2024 Rose Bowl.

On September 2, 2023, in the season opener against East Carolina, McCarthy recorded his best career passing game at home, throwing for 280 yards and three touchdowns. His 86.7% completion percentage (26-for-30) then ranked second-highest in program history, behind Elvis Grbac's 90.9% (20-for-22) against Notre Dame on September 14, 1991. In the next game against UNLV, McCarthy topped his previous percentage, completing 22-of-25 passes (88%) for 278 yards and two touchdowns.

On September 30, McCarthy completed 12-of-16 passes for 156 yards and two touchdowns against Nebraska, tying Todd Collins for ninth-most in program history with 37 career passing touchdowns. He also rushed for a touchdown. The following week, McCarthy had a passing touchdown and his first career game with two rushing scores in the victory over Minnesota. Over the next two weeks, McCarthy threw for 222 yards and three touchdowns against Indiana, as well as 287 yards and a career best four passing touchdowns against the rival Michigan State Spartans on the road. In three games in October, McCarthy accounted for 10 touchdowns. Against Purdue on November 4, he completed 24-of-37 passes for 335 yards, passing Tom Brady for ninth on the program's all-time passing yards list.

On November 25, in a third consecutive victory against Ohio State, McCarthy completed 16-of-20 passes for 148 yards and a touchdown to Roman Wilson, moving ahead of Shea Patterson for seventh on the program's all-time passing yards list. During the victory over Iowa in the 2023 Big Ten Championship, McCarthy became the fastest quarterback to reach 25 career wins in the 144-year history of Michigan football (26 starts).

On January 1, 2024, in a 27–20 overtime victory over Alabama in the Rose Bowl, McCarthy completed 17-of-27 passes for 221 yards and three touchdowns to three different receivers: Roman Wilson, Blake Corum, and Tyler Morris. McCarthy was named Rose Bowl Offensive Player of the Game. After the Rose Bowl, Harbaugh said that McCarthy is the greatest quarterback in Michigan football history. Tom Brady agreed with Harbaugh's statement in an Instagram comment. A week later against Washington in the National Championship, McCarthy completed 10-of-18 passes for 140 yards during the 34–13 victory, leading Michigan to an undefeated 15–0 record and its first national championship title since 1997.

McCarthy finished his career at Michigan with a 27–1 record (.964) as the starting quarterback, the best winning percentage in NCAA Division I Football Bowl Subdivision (FBS) history (1978–present), the third-best winning percentage in major college football history, and the best by any college quarterback since Chuck Ealey in 1971. In each of his three years at Michigan, the Wolverines beat Ohio State, won the Big Ten title, and advanced to the CFP semifinal.

== Professional career ==
Pre-draft measurables
Height	Weight	Arm length	Hand span	Wingspan	20-yard shuttle	Three-cone drill
6 ft 2 1/2 in (1.89 m)	219 lb (99 kg)	31 5/8 in (0.80 m)	9 in (0.23 m)	6 ft 3 7/8 in (1.93 m)	4.23 s	6.82 s
All values from NFL Combine

=== Minnesota Vikings ===
==== 2024 season ====
McCarthy was selected by the Minnesota Vikings 10th overall in the 2024 NFL draft. He was the fifth of six quarterbacks taken in the first round, tied with the 1983 draft for the most in NFL history. On July 19, 2024 the Vikings signed a four-year, fully-guaranteed contract worth $21.85 million that included a $12.71 million signing bonus and a fifth-year team option.

McCarthy was named the backup to Sam Darnold to open training camp. Following the preseason opener against the Las Vegas Raiders, where McCarthy threw two touchdowns and an interception, he reported soreness in practice and was found to have fully torn his meniscus in his right knee. McCarthy underwent surgery to repair it and was placed on injured reserve, becoming the first quarterback selected in the first round to miss his entire rookie season due to injury.

==== 2025 season ====
After Sam Darnold signed with the Seattle Seahawks in free agency, McCarthy was named the Vikings' starter heading into the 2025 season.

McCarthy made his NFL debut in the season opener against the division rival Chicago Bears and led the Vikings back from an 11-point fourth quarter deficit by throwing for two touchdowns and rushing for a third to win on the road, 27–24. McCarthy was named NFC Offensive Player of the Week for his performance. McCarthy became the first quarterback in NFL history to score three fourth-quarter touchdowns in his NFL debut, the first Vikings quarterback to throw multiple touchdowns in an NFL debut since Fran Tarkenton did so in the team's inaugural season in 1961, and the first quarterback to overcome a fourth quarter deficit of at least 10 points in an NFL debut since Hall of Famer Steve Young did it with the Tampa Bay Buccaneers in 1985. McCarthy was also the first quarterback to post a passing touchdown and a rushing touchdown in his debut since Cam Newton in 2011. In the next game against the Atlanta Falcons, McCarthy threw for 158 yards and two interceptions during the 22–6 loss. Following the game, it was revealed that McCarthy suffered a high ankle sprain, causing him to miss the next five games.

McCarthy returned from injury in time for the Week 9 matchup against the Detroit Lions, in which he had 143 passing yards, two touchdowns, and an interception to go along with 12 rushing yards and a touchdown during the 27–24 road victory. After three straight losses to the Baltimore Ravens, Chicago Bears, and Green Bay Packers, McCarthy was ruled out against the Seattle Seahawks due to a concussion. McCarthy returned in Week 14, a 31–0 shutout victory over the Washington Commanders. In Week 16's matchup against the New York Giants, McCarthy suffered a small hairline fracture in his throwing hand and subsequently missed the Week 17 matchup against the Detroit Lions.

==== 2026 season ====
Heading into the 2026 season, McCarthy competed with newly signed veteran quarterback Kyler Murray for the Vikings' starting job during offseason workouts and training camp. On August 11, the Vikings officially named Murray the starting quarterback, relegating McCarthy to the backup role. On September 9, following further inconsistent play and injuries in the preseason games, the Vikings named McCarthy the third-string quarterback, behind Murray and Carson Wentz.

=== New York Giants ===
On September 28, 2026, McCarthy was traded to the New York Giants to play under head coach John Harbaugh, the brother of his college coach. He was acquired for a 2027 fifth-round draft pick, with the move coming in the aftermath of Giants starting quarterback Jaxson Dart suffering a season-ending injury.

McCarthy initially served as the third-string quarterback behind starter Jameis Winston and Jake Haener, but was eventually elevated to the backup role. He relieved a struggling Winston in Week 6 against the New Orleans Saints with 11 minutes remaining in the game, throwing a touchdown and an interception as he helped the Giants erase a 34–10 deficit before losing 34–27. His 243 yards were the most by a Giants backup quarterback since Y. A. Tittle had 315 against the Washington Redskins in 1961. It also tied Eli Manning's franchise record for passing yards in a single fourth quarter, which was set in 2012.

The following week, McCarthy became the Giants' starter and led them to a victory over the Houston Texans 27–21 in overtime. In Week 9, he suffered a hip injury that briefly forced him out of the game; Winston led a scoring drive in his absence before McCarthy returned ahead of the fourth quarter, helping the Giants beat the Philadelphia Eagles 19–11.

== Career statistics ==
Legend
**Bold**	Career high

=== NFL ===
Year	Team	Games			Passing									Rushing					Sacks		Fumbles	
Year	Team	GP	GS	Record	Cmp	Att	Pct	Yds	Y/A	Lng	TD	Int	Rtg	Att	Yds	Avg	Lng	TD	Sck	SckY	Fum	Lost
2024	MIN	0	0	—	Did not play due to injury																	
2025	MIN	10	10	**6–4**	**140**	**243**	57.6	**1,632**	6.7	62	**11**	**12**	72.6	**37**	**181**	4.9	26	**4**	**27**	**149**	**6**	**2**
2026	NYG	5	3	2–1	66	104	**63.5**	915	**8.8**	**66**	2	2	**90.0**	15	85	**5.7**	**28**	2	10	67	1	0
Career		15	13	8–5	206	347	59.4	2,547	7.3	66	13	14	77.8	52	266	5.1	28	4	37	216	7	2

=== College ===
Season	Team	Games			Passing								Rushing			
Season	Team	GP	GS	Record	Comp	Att	Pct	Yards	Avg	TD	Int	Rate	Att	Yards	Avg	TD
2021	Michigan	11	0	0–0	34	59	57.6	516	8.7	5	2	152.3	27	124	**4.6**	2
2022	Michigan	14	13	12–1	208	322	64.6	2,719	8.4	**22**	**5**	155.0	**70**	**306**	4.4	**5**
2023	Michigan	15	15	**15–0**	**240**	**332**	**72.3**	**2,991**	**9.0**	**22**	4	**167.4**	64	202	3.2	3
Career		40	28	27–1	482	713	67.6	6,226	8.7	49	11	160.5	161	632	3.9	10

== Personal life ==
McCarthy is a practitioner of meditation, which he began doing in high school. McCarthy is engaged to his high school sweetheart Katya Kuropas, whom he proposed to just weeks after winning the national championship in early 2024. On September 12, 2025, McCarthy and Kuropas welcomed their first child, a son.
