= Elijah Williams (defensive lineman) =

American football player (born 2002)

No. 99 – Minnesota Vikings
- Position: Defensive end
- Roster status: Active

Personal information
- Born: September 9, 2002 (age 24); Jersey City, New Jersey, U.S.
- Listed height: 6 ft 3 in (1.91 m)
- Listed weight: 298 lb (135 kg)

Career information
- High school: Lincoln (Jersey City)
- College: Morgan State (2021–2024)
- NFL draft: 2025: undrafted

Career history
- Minnesota Vikings (2025–present)

Career NFL statistics as of Week 10, 2026
- Total tackles: 20
- Sacks: 1.0
- Stats at Pro Football Reference

Elijah Williams (born September 9, 2002) is an American professional football defensive end for the Minnesota Vikings of the National Football League (NFL). He played college football for the Morgan State Bears.

== Early life ==
Williams attended high school at Lincoln located in Jersey City, New Jersey. Coming out of high school, he committed to play college football for the Morgan State Bears.

== College career ==
During his four-year career at Morgan State from 2021 through 2024, he played in 42 games, totaling 216 tackles with 52 being for a loss, 31 sacks, three pass deflections, three forced fumbles, and a fumble recovery, where during his career he earned MEAC Defensive Player of the Year and FCS all-American honors.

== Professional career ==
Pre-draft measurables
Height	Weight	Arm length	Hand span	Wingspan	40-yard dash	10-yard split	20-yard split	20-yard shuttle	Three-cone drill	Vertical jump	Broad jump	Bench press
6 ft 2 in (1.88 m)	288 lb (131 kg)	33 5/8 in (0.85 m)	9 in (0.23 m)	6 ft 7 1/8 in (2.01 m)	5.20 s	1.71 s	2.94 s	4.35 s	7.40 s	31.0 in (0.79 m)	9 ft 0 in (2.74 m)	30 reps
All values from HBCU Combine/Pro Day

After not being selected in the 2025 NFL draft, Williams signed with the Minnesota Vikings as an undrafted free agent. In Week 1 of the 2025 preseason, Williams notched a tackle and half for a loss, four pressures, and a quarterback hit. He made the initial 53-man roster on August 26, 2025 as one of the seven undrafted free agents that made the Vikings roster. Williams made seven appearances for Minnesota during his rookie campaign, recording nine combined tackles. On December 29, Williams was placed on season-ending injured reserve due to an ankle injury suffered in Week 17 against the Detroit Lions.

In week 10 of the 2026 NFL season against the Green Bay Packers, Williams was responsible for one of the 8 sacks that the Vikings made over Jordan Love. This was his first career sack and he finished the game with five total tackles in the 30–10 win.
