= Jordan Mason =

American football player (born 1999)

No. 27 – Minnesota Vikings
- Position: Running back
- Roster status: Active

Personal information
- Born: May 24, 1999 (age 27); Gallatin, Tennessee, U.S.
- Listed height: 5 ft 11 in (1.80 m)
- Listed weight: 230 lb (104 kg)

Career information
- High school: Gallatin
- College: Georgia Tech (2017–2021)
- NFL draft: 2022: undrafted

Career history
- San Francisco 49ers (2022–2024); Minnesota Vikings (2025–present)

Awards and highlights
- Third-team All-ACC (2019)

Career NFL statistics as of Week 10, 2026
- Rushing yards: 2,252
- Rushing average: 4.9
- Rushing touchdowns: 14
- Receptions: 30
- Receiving yards: 180
- Stats at Pro Football Reference

Jordan Ponchez Mason (born May 24, 1999) is an American professional football running back for the Minnesota Vikings of the National Football League (NFL). He played college football for the Georgia Tech Yellow Jackets and signed with the San Francisco 49ers as an undrafted free agent in 2022.

== College career ==
Mason played college football at Georgia Tech, positioned as a running back from 2017 to 2021.

As a freshman, Mason had 108 carries for 659 yards and seven touchdowns, averaging 6.1 yards per carry.

As a sophomore, Mason set career-highs in rushing attempts with 172, rushing yards with 899 yards, and rushing touchdowns with seven.

As a junior, Mason rushed 82 times for 352 yards and two touchdowns.

As a senior, Mason had 87 carries for 439 yards and a touchdown to go along with 10 receptions for 80 yards and a touchdown.

=== Statistics ===
Year	G	Rushing				Receiving			
Year	G	Att	Yds	Avg	TD	Rec	Yds	Avg	TD
2017	0	Did not play							
2018	13	108	659	6.1	7	1	2	2.0	0
2019	12	172	899	5.2	7	7	43	6.1	0
2020	6	82	352	4.3	2	8	72	9.0	0
2021	12	87	439	5.0	1	10	80	8.0	1
Career	43	449	2,349	5.2	17	26	197	7.6	1

== Professional career ==
Pre-draft measurables
Height	Weight	Arm length	Hand span	Wingspan	40-yard dash	10-yard split	20-yard split	20-yard shuttle	Three-cone drill	Vertical jump	Broad jump	Bench press
5 ft 11 1/8 in (1.81 m)	223 lb (101 kg)	30 3/4 in (0.78 m)	8 7/8 in (0.23 m)	6 ft 2 7/8 in (1.90 m)	4.58 s	1.57 s	2.64 s	4.40 s	7.19 s	33.0 in (0.84 m)	9 ft 11 in (3.02 m)	21 reps
All values from Pro Day

=== San Francisco 49ers ===
==== 2022 season ====
Mason signed with the San Francisco 49ers as an undrafted free agent in 2022. He made the 49ers' initial 53-man roster out of training camp.

During a Week 15 21–13 road victory over the Seattle Seahawks on Thursday Night Football, Mason had four carries for 64 yards and iced the game with a 55-yard rush, which also guaranteed the 49ers would win the NFC West. Two weeks later against the Las Vegas Raiders, he rushed twice for 13 yards and his first NFL touchdown in the 37–34 overtime road victory.

Mason finished his rookie year with 43 carries for 258 yards and a touchdown in 16 games and no starts. During the Wild Card Round against the Seahawks, he had two carries for 12 yards in the 41–23 victory.

==== 2023 season ====
During a Week 5 42–10 victory over the Dallas Cowboys on Sunday Night Football, Mason led the 49ers in rushing with 10 carries for 69 yards and a touchdown. In the next game against the Cleveland Browns, he had five carries for 27 yards and a touchdown during the narrow 19–17 road loss. During a Week 14 28–16 victory over the Seahawks, Mason recorded four carries for 20 yards and a touchdown to go along with a six-yard reception.

Mason finished his second professional season with 40 carries for 206 yards and three touchdowns to go along with three receptions for 31 yards in 17 games and no starts.

==== 2024 season ====
During the season-opener against the New York Jets on Monday Night Football, Mason earned his first NFL start in place of an injured Christian McCaffrey and finished the 32–19 victory with a career-high 147 rushing yards and a touchdown to go along with a five-yard reception. In the next game against the Minnesota Vikings, Mason had 20 carries for 100 yards and a touchdown during the 23–17 road loss. Two weeks later, he had 160 scrimmage yards and a rushing touchdown in a 30–13 victory over the New England Patriots.

During Week 6 against the Seahawks on Thursday Night Football, Mason had nine carries for 73 yards before leaving the eventual 36–24 road victory in the second quarter with a shoulder injury. He played in the next game against the Kansas City Chiefs, but exited the Week 8 matchup against the Cowboys after aggravating his existing left shoulder sprain. After McCaffrey returned in Week 10, Mason returned to a backup role. During a Week 13 35–10 road loss to the Buffalo Bills on Sunday Night Football, Mason had 13 carries for 78 yards but suffered a high ankle sprain. On December 2, 49ers head coach Shanahan announced that Mason will be placed on injured reserve. He was placed on injured reserve five days later.

Mason finished the 2024 season with 153 carries for 789 yards and three touchdowns to go along with 11 receptions for 91 yards in 12 games and six starts.

==== 2025 season ====
On March 11, 2025, the 49ers placed a second-round restricted free agent tender on Mason.

=== Minnesota Vikings ===
On March 18, 2025, the 49ers traded Mason and a 2025 sixth round pick (187th overall) to the Minnesota Vikings for a 2025 fifth round pick (160th overall) and a 2026 sixth round pick. Mason made his Vikings debut in the season-opener against the Chicago Bears on Monday Night Football and finished the 27–24 road victory with 15 carries for 68 yards and a seven-yard reception. Two weeks later against the Cincinnati Bengals, Mason had 16 carries for 116 yards and two touchdowns in the 48–10 victory.

On September 16, 2026, Mason was placed on injured reserve due to a thumb injury suffered in the team's season opener against the Green Bay Packers. On October 24, he was activated from injured reserve ahead of the team's Week 7 game against the Indianapolis Colts.

== NFL career statistics ==
Legend
**Bold**	Career high

=== Regular season ===
Year	Team	Games		Rushing					Receiving					Fumbles	
Year	Team	GP	GS	Att	Yds	Y/A	Lng	TD	Rec	Yds	Y/R	Lng	TD	Fum	Lost
2022	SF	16	0	43	258	**6.0**	**55**	1	0	0	0.0	0	0	0	0
2023	SF	**17**	0	40	206	5.2	26	3	3	31	**10.3**	13	0	0	0
2024	SF	12	**6**	153	**789**	5.2	38	3	11	**91**	8.3	**24**	0	**3**	0
2025	MIN	16	5	**159**	758	4.8	24	**6**	**14**	51	3.6	13	0	**3**	**1**
2026	MIN	5	0	60	241	4.0	28	1	2	7	0.0	4	0	0	0
Career		66	11	455	2,252	4.9	55	14	30	180	6.2	24	0	6	1

=== Postseason ===
Year	Team	Games		Rushing					Receiving					Fumbles	
Year	Team	GP	GS	Att	Yds	Y/A	Lng	TD	Rec	Yds	Y/R	Lng	TD	Fum	Lost
2022	SF	**3**	0	**2**	**12**	**6.0**	**8**	0	0	0	0	0	0	0	0
2023	SF	**3**	0	0	0	0.0	0	0	0	0	0	0	0	0	0
Career		6	0	2	12	6.0	8	0	0	0	0	0	0	0	0
