= 2026 Minnesota Vikings season =

66th season in franchise history

- Owner: Zygi Wilf
- General manager: Nolan Teasley
- President: Mark Wilf
- Head coach: Kevin O'Connell
- Offensive coordinator: Wes Phillips
- Defensive coordinator: Brian Flores
- Home stadium: U.S. Bank Stadium

Results
- Record: 7–2
- Division place: 2nd NFC North

Uniform
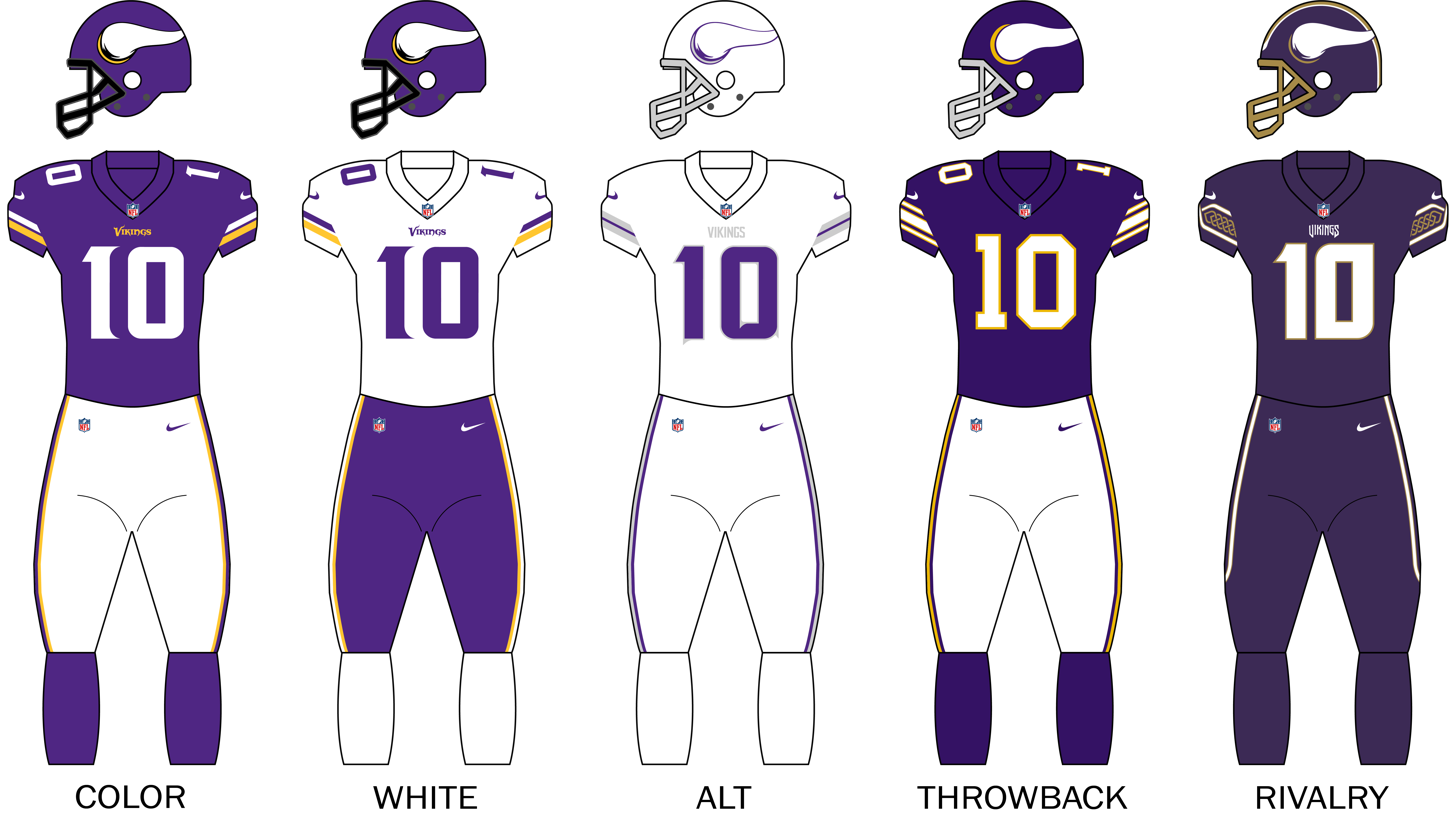

The 2026 season is the Minnesota Vikings' 66th in the National Football League (NFL), their 11th playing their home games at U.S. Bank Stadium, their 22nd under the ownership of Zygi Wilf, their fifth under head coach Kevin O'Connell, and their first under new general manager Nolan Teasley. Executive vice president of football operations Rob Brzezinski served as the team's interim general manager through the 2026 NFL draft. The Vikings will hope to improve upon their 9–8 record from the previous season, return to the playoffs after a one-year absence, and end their three-year NFC North title drought. The Vikings started the season 6–0 for the first time since 2009, and became the last undefeated team in the league at the time. However, a Week 8 road loss to the Detroit Lions ended Minnesota's hopes of remaining undefeated.

In the offseason, fullback C. J. Ham announced his retirement after 10 seasons, all spent with the team. Safety Harrison Smith was also released after 14 seasons with the team, but signed a new contract a week before the start of the regular season.

== Offseason ==
=== Staff ===
2026 Minnesota Vikings coaching staff changes
Position	Previous incumbent	Vacancy reason	Replacement(s)	Source(s)
Defensive coordinator	Brian Flores, 2023–present	Contract extended	—N/a	
General manager	Kwesi Adofo-Mensah, 2022–2025	Fired	Nolan Teasley	
Defensive backs coach	Daronte Jones, 2022–2025	Hired by the Washington Commanders	Gerald Alexander	
Offensive line coach	Chris Kuper, 2022–2025	Contract expired	Keith Carter	
Assistant head coach	Mike Pettine, 2022–2025	Retired	Frank Smith	
Defensive running game coordinator	—N/a	—N/a	Ryan Nielsen	
Football administration consultant	—N/a	—N/a	Matt Thomas	
Assistant offensive line coach	Keith Carter, 2025	Promoted to offensive line coach	Derek Warehime	
Tight ends coach	Brian Angelichio, 2022–2025	Hired by the Pittsburgh Steelers	Ryan Cordell	
Offensive passing game coordinator	Brian Angelichio, 2022–2025	Hired by the Pittsburgh Steelers	Josh McCown	
Assistant wide receivers coach	Tony Sorrentino, 2022–2025	Hired by the Arizona Cardinals	Derron Montgomery	
Assistant defensive line coach	Imarjaye Albury Sr., 2020–2025	Hired by Texas Tech	Patrick Hill	
Passing game specialist	Ryan Cordell, 2022–2025	Promoted to tight ends coach	Jordan Traylor	
Offensive quality control	Derron Montgomery, 2022–2025	Promoted to assistant wide receivers coach	Kyle Caskey	
Assistant special teams coach	Dalmin Gibson, 2023–2025	Promoted to assistant linebackers coach	Chili Davis	
Assistant offensive coordinator	Jordan Traylor, 2025	Promoted to assistant quarterbacks coach/passing game specialist	Chris O'Hara	
Defensive assistant	—N/a	—N/a	Will Johnson	
Assistant defensive backs coach	—N/a	—N/a	Chenzo Funari	
Assistant linebackers coach	—N/a	—N/a	Dalmin Gibson	
Senior defensive assistant	—N/a	—N/a	Mike Siravo	
Assistant general manager	Ryan Grigson, 2022–2025	Replaced	Andrew Healy	
Assistant general manager	Demitrius Washington, 2022–2025	Replaced	Trent Kirchner	
Director of football strategy	—N/a	—N/a	Tyler Hamblin	
Football advisor	—N/a	—N/a	Ryan Pace	
Assistant director of pro scouting	—N/a	—N/a	Azzaam Kapadia	

=== Futures contracts ===
Position	Player	Date signed	Source
WR	Dontae Fleming	January 5	
S	Kahlef Hailassie	January 5	
LB	Josh Ross	January 5	
G	Vershon Lee	January 5	
T	Caleb Etienne	January 5	
WR	Joaquin Davis	January 5	
WR	Jeshaun Jones	January 5	
TE	Bryson Nesbit	January 5	
DL	Jaylon Hutchings	January 7	
LB	Jacob Roberts	January 7	

=== Free agents ===
Position	Player	Free agency tag	2026 team	Date	Notes	Source
LB	Eric Wilson	UFA	Minnesota Vikings	March 9	3 years, $22.5 million	
OLB	Bo Richter	ERFA	Minnesota Vikings	March 9	1 year, $1.075 million	
RB	Zavier Scott	ERFA	Minnesota Vikings	March 9	1 year, $1.005 million	
LS	Andrew DePaola	UFA	Minnesota Vikings	March 10	1 years, $1.725 million	
S	Tavierre Thomas	UFA	Minnesota Vikings	March 11	2 years, $4.6 million	
P	Ryan Wright	UFA	New Orleans Saints	March 11	4 years, $14 million	
WR	Jalen Nailor	UFA	Las Vegas Raiders	March 12	3 years, $35.03 million	
TE	Ben Sims	RFA	Miami Dolphins	March 16	1 year, $1.3325 million	
RB	Ty Chandler	UFA	New Orleans Saints	March 17	1 year, $1.215 million	
QB	Carson Wentz	UFA	Minnesota Vikings	March 19	1 year, $3 million	
T	Justin Skule	UFA	Tampa Bay Buccaneers	April 6		
DL	Jalen Redmond	ERFA	Minnesota Vikings	April 14	1 year, $1.075 million	
LB	Ivan Pace Jr.	RFA	Minnesota Vikings	April 20	1 year, $3.52 million	
CB	Fabian Moreau	UFA	Washington Commanders	August 4	1 year, $1.45 million	
QB	Brett Rypien	UFA	Houston Texans	August 15	1 year, $1.3 million	
T	Matt Nelson	UFA				
CB	Jeff Okudah	UFA				
QB	John Wolford	UFA				

=== Signings ===
Position	Player	Free agency tag	Former team	Date signed	Notes	Source
CB	James Pierre	UFA	Pittsburgh Steelers	March 12	2 years, $8.5 million	
QB	Jaxson Dart	UFA	New York Giants	March 12	1 year, $1.3 million	
P	Johnny Hekker	UFA	Tennessee Titans	March 17	1 year, $1.4875 million	
OL	Ryan Van Demark	RFA	Buffalo Bills	March 20	1 year, $4.2 million	
DL	Eric Johnson	UFA	Indianapolis Colts	April 29	1 year, $1.4025 million	
WR	Jauan Jennings	UFA	San Francisco 49ers	May 7	1 year, $8 million	
DL	Isaiahh Loudermilk	UFA	Pittsburgh Steelers	May 21	1 year, $1.125 million	
LB	Jamal Adams	UFA	Las Vegas Raiders	July 28	1 year, $1.41 million	

=== Releases/retirements ===
Position	Player	New team	Date released/retired	Source
CB	Tyrek Funderburk	Carolina Panthers	January 12	
DE	Jonathan Harris	Minnesota Vikings	January 12	
RB	Sincere McCormick	San Francisco 49ers	January 12	
LB	Gabriel Murphy		January 12	
OT	Max Pircher	Houston Texans	January 12	
LB	Sione Takitaki	Houston Texans	January 12	
FB	C. J. Ham	Retired	February 5	
C	Ryan Kelly	Retired	March 6	
DL	Jonathan Allen	Cincinnati Bengals	March 11	
DL	Javon Hargrave	Green Bay Packers	March 11	
S	Harrison Smith	Minnesota Vikings	March 11	

=== Trades ===
Position	Player	Team	Date traded	Notes	Source
OLB	Jonathan Greenard	Philadelphia Eagles	April 24	MIN receives: 2026 third-round pick, 2027 third-round pick PHI receives: 2026 seventh-round pick, Greenard	
T	Walter Rouse	New England Patriots	August 30	MIN receives: 2027 sixth-round pick NE receives: 2027 seventh-round pick, Rouse	
QB	J. J. McCarthy	New York Giants	September 28	MIN receives: 2027 fifth-round pick NYG receives: McCarthy	
QB	Kirk Cousins	Las Vegas Raiders	November 10	MIN receives: Cousins; LV receives: 2027 third-round pick	

=== Draft ===
Having finished with a 9–8 record in 2025, equal with the Detroit Lions, the Vikings had the 18th overall pick in the 2026 NFL draft and alternated with the Lions in each subsequent round. They were scheduled to go into the draft with nine selections, their most since the 2022 draft. As well as their original first-, second-, third- and seventh-round picks, they were also awarded an additional third-round pick in compensation for the loss of QB Sam Darnold. They acquired an additional sixth-round selection in a trade that sent DT Harrison Phillips to the New York Jets, in conjunction with a late-round pick swap in 2027; that sixth-round pick was later sent to the Philadelphia Eagles along with QB Sam Howell in exchange for an additional fifth-round selection. They acquired another sixth-round selection in a trade that sent CB Mekhi Blackmon to the Indianapolis Colts.

The Vikings originally traded away their fifth-round pick to the Jacksonville Jaguars in exchange for OT Cam Robinson and an additional seventh-round pick; the trade contained conditions that the fifth-round pick would be upgraded to a fourth-round pick and the seventh-round pick would be annulled based on Robinson meeting a playing time threshold, which he did. Having regained their original fifth-round pick, the Vikings then traded it away to the Carolina Panthers in exchange for WR Adam Thielen and an additional seventh-round selection, as well as swapping mid-round picks in 2027. The Vikings' original sixth-round pick was first sent to the Houston Texans as part of a trade for RB Cam Akers that also gave the Vikings an additional seventh-round pick; the Texans then traded that same sixth-round pick back to the Vikings in exchange for G Ed Ingram, before the Vikings again traded the pick away to the San Francisco 49ers (along with a 2025 fifth-round selection) for RB Jordan Mason.

With their first-round pick, the Vikings selected Florida Gators defensive lineman Caleb Banks.

2026 Minnesota Vikings draft selections
Round	Selection	Player	Position	College	Notes
1	18	Caleb Banks	DL	Florida	
2	49	Traded to the Carolina Panthers (Note: The Vikings traded second- and sixth- round selections (49th and 196th overall) to the Carolina Panthers in exchange for second- and fifth- round selections (51st and 159th overall).)			
2	51	Jake Golday	LB	Cincinnati	From Panthers
3	82	Domonique Orange	DL	Iowa State	
3	97	Caleb Tiernan	OT	Northwestern	Compensatory selection
3	98	Jakobe Thomas	S	Miami (FL)	From Eagles (Note: The Vikings traded a seventh-round selection (244th overall) and OLB Jonathan Greenard to the Philadelphia Eagles in exchange for a third-round selection (98th overall) and a 2027 third-round selection.)
4	117	Traded to the Jacksonville Jaguars (Note: The Vikings traded a conditional fifth-round selection to the Jacksonville Jaguars in exchange for a conditional seventh-round selection and OT Cam Robinson. The fifth-round selection became a fourth-round selection (117th overall) as a result of Robinson meeting playing time criteria. The conditions for the seventh-round selection were not met.)			
5	158	Traded to the Carolina Panthers (Note: The Vikings traded a fifth-round selection (158th overall) and a 2027 fourth-round selection to the Carolina Panthers in exchange for a conditional seventh-round selection (235th overall), a 2027 fifth-round selection and WR Adam Thielen.)			
5	159	Max Bredeson	FB	Michigan	From Panthers
5	163	Charles Demmings	CB	Stephen F. Austin	From Eagles (Note: The Vikings traded a sixth-round selection (211th overall) and QB Sam Howell to the Philadelphia Eagles in exchange for a fifth-round selection (163rd overall) and a 2027 seventh-round selection.)
6	196	Traded to the Carolina Panthers			From Colts (Note: The Vikings traded CB Mekhi Blackmon to the Indianapolis Colts in exchange for a sixth-round selection (196th overall).)
6	198	Demond Claiborne	RB	Wake Forest	From Vikings (Note: The Vikings traded a conditional sixth-round selection (198th overall) to the Houston Texans in exchange for a conditional seventh-round selection (244th overall) and RB Cam Akers.) via Texans, (Note: The Vikings traded G Ed Ingram to the Houston Texans in exchange for a sixth-round selection (198th overall).) 49ers (Note: The Vikings traded a sixth-round selection (198th overall) and a 2025 fifth-round selection to the San Francisco 49ers in exchange for RB Jordan Mason.) and Patriots (Note: The Vikings traded a seventh-round selection (234th overall) and a 2027 sixth-round selection to the New England Patriots in exchange for a sixth-round selection (198th overall).)
6	211	Traded to the Philadelphia Eagles			From Broncos via Jets (Note: The Vikings traded a 2027 seventh-round selection and DT Harrison Phillips to the New York Jets in exchange for a sixth-round selection (211th overall) and a 2027 sixth-round selection.)
7	234	Traded to the New England Patriots			
7	235	Gavin Gerhardt	C	Cincinnati	From Panthers
7	244	Traded to the Philadelphia Eagles			From Texans

2026 Minnesota Vikings undrafted free agents
Name	Position	College	Ref.
Marcus Allen	CB	North Carolina	
Da'Veawn Armstead	CB	North Texas	
Dillon Bell	WR	Georgia	
Jordan Botelho	OLB	Notre Dame	
Tyreek Chappell	CB	Texas A&M	
Terrill Davis	WR	Oklahoma State	
Monkell Goodwine	DL	South Carolina	
Bangally Kamara	LB	Kansas	
Shaleak Knotts	WR	Maryland	
Keli Lawson	LB	UCF	
Tristan Leigh	OL	Clemson	
Delby Lemieux	OL	Dartmouth	
Kejon Owens	RB	FIU	
Tomas Rimac	OL	Virginia Tech	
Marcus Sanders Jr.	WR	Georgia Southern	
Cam'Ron Stewart	OLB	Temple	
Jacob Thomas	S	James Madison	
Brett Thorson	P	Georgia	
Smith Vilbert	DL	North Carolina	
Arden Walker	OLB	Colorado	
Lyke Wysong	WR	Arizona	

- Note: Texas A&M linebacker Scooby Williams agreed to terms, but he failed his physical and did not sign.

Draft trades

== Staff ==
Minnesota Vikings staff
Front office: Owner/chairman – Zygi Wilf; Owner/vice chairman – Leonard Wilf; Owner/president – Mark Wilf; Chief operating officer – Andrew Miller; Executive vice president of football operations – Rob Brzezinski; General manager – Nolan Teasley; Assistant general manager – Andrew Healy; Assistant general manager – Trent Kirchner; Director of scouting strategy – Tyler Hamblin; Football advisor – Ryan Pace; Director of player personnel – Ryan Monnens; Assistant director of player personnel – Chisom Opara; Director of pro personnel – Sam DeLuca; Assistant director of pro personnel – Azzaam Kapadia; Director of college scouting – Mike Sholiton; Senior manager, football administration – Emily Badis; Director of football quantitative methods – Chris French; Head coaches: Head coach – Kevin O'Connell; Assistant head coach – Frank Smith; Offensive coaches: Offensive coordinator – Wes Phillips; Assistant offensive coordinator – Chris O'Hara; Offensive passing game coordinator/quarterbacks – Josh McCown; Assistant quarterbacks/passing game specialist – Jordan Traylor; Offensive running game coordinator/running backs – Curtis Modkins; Wide receivers – Keenan McCardell; Assistant wide receivers – Derron Montgomery; Tight ends/game management coordinator – Ryan Cordell; Offensive line – Keith Carter; Assistant offensive line – Derek Warehime; Offensive assistant – Ben Ellefson; Offensive quality control – Kyle Caskey	Defensive coaches: Defensive coordinator – Brian Flores; Defensive running game coordinator – Ryan Nielsen; Assistant defensive line – Patrick Hill; Outside linebackers – Thad Bogardus; Senior defensive assistant/inside linebackers – Mike Siravo; Assistant linebackers – Dalmin Gibson; Defensive passing game coordinator/defensive backs – Gerald Alexander; Assistant defensive backs – Chenzo Funari; Defensive assistant – Charlie Frye, Will Johnson; Special teams coaches: Special teams coordinator – Matt Daniels; Assistant special teams coordinator – Chili Davis; Strength and conditioning: Vice president, player health and performance – Tyler Williams; Director of sports medicine – Matt Duhamel; Associate head athletic trainer – Connor Whicker; Head performance dietician – Ben Hawkins; Head strength coach – Joe Distor Jr.; → Coaching staff → Front office → More NFL staffs

== Current roster ==
Minnesota Vikings roster
Quarterbacks (QB): 12 Max Brosmer; 8 Kirk Cousins; 1 Kyler Murray; 11 Carson Wentz; Running backs (RB): 45 Max Bredeson FB; 31 DeeJay Dallas; 33 Aaron Jones; 27 Jordan Mason; Wide receivers (WR): 3 Jordan Addison; 13 Tai Felton; 18 Justin Jefferson; 14 Jauan Jennings; 82 Jeshaun Jones; 4 Myles Price RS; Tight ends (TE): 86 Gavin Bartholomew; 87 T. J. Hockenson; 85 Ben Yurosek	Offensive linemen (OL): 64 Blake Brandel C; 71 Christian Darrisaw T; 76 Will Fries G; 60 Joe Huber G; 65 Michael Jurgens C; 75 Brian O'Neill T; 78 Caleb Tiernan T; 72 Ryan Van Demark T; Defensive linemen (DL): 95 Caleb Banks; 90 Tyrion Ingram-Dawkins; 97 Domonique Orange; 61 Jalen Redmond; 50 Levi Drake Rodriguez; 99 Elijah Williams	Linebackers (LB): 51 Blake Cashman; 32 Chaz Chambliss OLB; 41 Jake Golday; 0 Ivan Pace Jr.; 15 Dallas Turner OLB; 43 Andrew Van Ginkel OLB; 17 Kyle Van Noy OLB; 55 Eric Wilson; Defensive backs (DB): 20 Charles Demmings CB; 26 Theo Jackson S; 44 Josh Metellus S; 7 Byron Murphy CB; 23 James Pierre CB; 2 Isaiah Rodgers CB; 22 Harrison Smith S; 29 Jacob Thomas S; 6 Jakobe Thomas S; 5 Zemaiah Vaughn CB; 24 Jay Ward S; Special teams (ST): 42 Andrew DePaola LS; 16 Will Reichard K; 19 Brett Thorson P	Practice squad: 38 Da'Veawn Armstead CB; 57 Keshawn Banks OLB; 34 Damon Bankston RB; 36 Macéo Beard S (IPP); 9 Odell Beckham Jr. WR; 37 D'Anthony Bell S; 89 Dillon Bell WR; 81 Michael Briscoe WR (PS/I); 68 Henry Byrd G; 83 Devin Culp TE; 54 Kenny Dyson OLB; 25 D'Wayne Eskridge WR; 59 Bangally Kamara LB; 79 Jack Nelson T; 67 Josh Priebe G; 96 Jahvaree Ritzie DT; 56 Josh Ross LB; 52 Jihad Ward OLB; Reserve: -- Jamal Adams LB (IR); 92 Tyler Batty OLB (IR); 21 Demond Claiborne RB (IR); 74 Donovan Jackson G (IR); 84 Josh Oliver TE (IR); 98 Bo Richter OLB (IR); 62 Nick Samac C (IR) 53 active, 16 practice squad (1 IPP), 8 reserve As of November 18, 2026. Rookies in italics.; Roster; Depth chart; Transactions

== Preseason ==
=== Schedule ===
The Vikings' preseason opponents and schedule were announced on May 14, 2026, in conjunction with the release of the regular season schedule.

Week	Date	Opponent	Result	Record	Venue	Recap
1	August 15	at New York Giants	W 13–10	1–0	MetLife Stadium	Recap
2	August 22	Baltimore Ravens	L 3–13	1–1	U.S. Bank Stadium	Recap
3	August 28	at Denver Broncos	L 6–34	1–2	Empower Field at Mile High	Recap

=== Game summaries ===
==== Week 1: at New York Giants ====
Preseason Week 1: Minnesota Vikings at New York Giants – Game summary

Quarter	1	2	3	4	Total
Vikings	3	0	10	0	13
Giants	0	10	0	0	10

at MetLife Stadium, East Rutherford, New Jersey

- Date: August 15
- Game time: 12:00 p.m.
- Game weather: Fair, 80 °F (27 °C)
- Game attendance: 77,494
- Referee: Jonah Monroe (120)
- TV announcers (KMSP): Paul Allen, Pete Bercich, Ben Leber and Tatum Everett
- Recap, Game Book

Game information

First quarter

- MIN – Will Reichard 35-yard field goal, 9:25. Vikings 3–0. Drive: 10 plays, 54 yards, 5:35.

Second quarter

- NYG – Malachi Fields 15-yard pass from Jaxson Dart (Ben Sauls kick), 13:32. Giants 7–3. Drive: 10 plays, 63 yards, 5:49.
- NYG – Ben Sauls 46-yard field goal, 0:00. Giants 10–3. Drive: 6 plays, 17 yards, 1:11.

Third quarter

- MIN – Will Reichard 54-yard field goal, 8:02. Giants 10–6. Drive: 8 plays, 57 yards, 4:26.
- MIN – Myles Price 1-yard pass from Carson Wentz (Will Reichard kick), 4:04. Vikings 13–10. Drive: 7 plays, 27 yards, 3:45.

Fourth quarter

- No scoring plays.

Top passers

- MIN – Carson Wentz – 9/14, 81 yards, TD
- NYG – Jameis Winston – 8/9, 89 yards

Top rushers

- MIN – Demond Claiborne – 12 rushes, 34 yards
- NYG – Eric Gray – 8 rushes, 20 yards

Top receivers

- MIN – Myles Price – 4 receptions, 51 yards, TD
- NYG – Devin Singletary – 1 reception, 40 yards

==== Week 2: vs. Baltimore Ravens ====
Preseason Week 2: Baltimore Ravens at Minnesota Vikings – Game summary

Quarter	1	2	3	4	Total
Ravens	0	3	7	3	13
Vikings	0	3	0	0	3

at U.S. Bank Stadium, Minneapolis, Minnesota

- Date: August 22
- Game time: 12:00 p.m.
- Game weather: None (indoor stadium)
- Game attendance: 66,700
- Referee: Scott Helverson (93)
- TV announcers (KMSP): Paul Allen, Pete Bercich, Ben Leber and Tatum Everett
- Recap, Game Book

Game information

First quarter

- No scoring plays.

Second quarter

- BAL – Tyler Loop 49-yard field goal, 9:17. Ravens 3–0. Drive: 9 plays, 60 yards, 5:37.
- MIN – Will Reichard 52-yard field goal, 0:00. Tied 3–3. Drive: 8 plays, 57 yards, 1:48.

Third quarter

- BAL – LaJohntay Wester 8-yard pass from Joe Fagnano (Tyler Loop kick), 5:55. Ravens 10–3. Drive: 9 plays, 63 yards, 4:20.

Fourth quarter

- BAL – Tyler Loop 20-yard field goal, 8:45. Ravens 13–3. Drive: 11 plays, 42 yards, 6:09.

Top passers

- BAL – Joe Fagnano – 15/20, 123 yards, TD
- MIN – Max Brosmer – 11/17, 98 yards, INT

Top rushers

- BAL – Jonathan Ward – 10 rushes, 35 yards
- MIN – Zavier Scott – 7 rushes, 28 yards

Top receivers

- BAL – Josh Cuevas – 3 receptions, 46 yards
- MIN – Tai Felton – 3 receptions, 66 yards

==== Week 3: at Denver Broncos ====
Preseason Week 3: Minnesota Vikings at Denver Broncos – Game summary

Quarter	1	2	3	4	Total
Vikings	0	6	0	0	6
Broncos	10	10	0	14	34

at Empower Field at Mile High, Denver, Colorado

- Date: August 28
- Game time: 8:00 p.m.
- Game weather: Mostly cloudy, 79 °F (26 °C)
- Game attendance: 75,826
- Referee: Bill Vinovich (52)
- TV announcers (KMSP): Paul Allen, Pete Bercich, Ben Leber and Tatum Everett
- Recap, Game Book

Game information

First quarter

- DEN – Wil Lutz 43-yard field goal, 11:33. Broncos 3–0. Drive: 8 plays, 40 yards, 3:27.
- DEN – Adam Prentice 1-yard run (Wil Lutz kick), 3:28. Broncos 10–0. Drive: 12 plays, 88 yards, 6:25.

Second quarter

- MIN – Will Reichard 46-yard field goal, 9:51. Broncos 10–3. Drive: 6 plays, 18 yards, 3:37.
- DEN – Wil Lutz 37-yard field goal, 5:30. Broncos 13–3. Drive: 9 plays, 29 yards, 4:21.
- MIN – Will Reichard 28-yard field goal, 1:30. Broncos 13–6. Drive: 14 plays, 55 yards, 4:00.
- DEN – Jaleel McLaughlin 20-yard pass from Sam Ehlinger (Wil Lutz kick), 0:22. Broncos 20–6. Drive: 5 plays, 65 yards, 1:08.

Third quarter

- No scoring plays.

Fourth quarter

- DEN – Cody Schrader 14-yard pass from Sam Ehlinger (Wil Lutz kick), 13:04. Broncos 27–6. Drive: 17 plays, 85 yards, 9:58.
- DEN – Justin Joly 88-yard pass from Sam Ehlinger (Wil Lutz kick), 8:08. Broncos 34–6. Drive: 3 plays, 93 yards, 1:39.

Top passers

- MIN – Max Brosmer – 20/35, 165 yards
- DEN – Sam Ehlinger – 15/20, 233 yards, 3 TD, INT

Top rushers

- MIN – Jermar Jefferson – 6 rushes, 59 yards
- DEN – Cody Schrader – 13 rushes, 42 yards

Top receivers

- MIN – Dontae Fleming – 4 receptions, 55 yards
- DEN – Justin Joly – 2 receptions, 95 yards, TD

== Regular season ==
=== Schedule ===
On May 13, the NFL announced that the Vikings will play the San Francisco 49ers at Estadio Azteca in Mexico City, Mexico, on November 22, as part of the league's International Series. The game will kick off at 7:20 p.m. CST, televised by NBC, with the 49ers serving as the home team.

The remainder of the Vikings' 2026 schedule was announced on May 14. They will play nine games at home and eight on the road. In addition to home and away matchups against each of their NFC North divisional rivals, they will play against each of the teams in the NFC South and AFC East, as well as the teams that also finished in third place in each of the NFC East, NFC West and AFC South.

Week	Date	Time (CT)	Opponent	Result	Record	Venue	Network	Recap
1	September 13	3:25 p.m.	**Green Bay Packers**	**W** 39–22	1–0	U.S. Bank Stadium	CBS	Recap
2	September 20	12:00 p.m.	at **Chicago Bears**	**W** 9–3	2–0	Soldier Field	Fox	Recap
3	September 27	3:05 p.m.	at Tampa Bay Buccaneers	**W** 23–16	3–0	Raymond James Stadium	Fox	Recap
4	October 4	3:05 p.m.	Miami Dolphins	**W** 15–10	4–0	U.S. Bank Stadium	Fox	Recap
5	October 11	12:00 p.m.	at New Orleans Saints	**W** 23–13	5–0	Caesars Superdome	Fox	Recap
6	Bye							
7	October 25	12:00 p.m.	Indianapolis Colts	**W** 16–10	6–0	U.S. Bank Stadium	CBS	Recap
8	November 1	12:00 p.m.	at **Detroit Lions**	**L** 15–19	6–1	Ford Field	Fox	Recap
9	November 9	7:15 p.m.	Buffalo Bills	**L** 6–23	6–2	U.S. Bank Stadium	ESPN/ABC	Recap
10	November 15	12:00 p.m.	at **Green Bay Packers**	**W** 30–10	7–2	Lambeau Field	Fox	Recap
11	November 22	7:20 p.m.	at San Francisco 49ers			Estadio Azteca (Mexico City)	NBC	
12	November 29	12:00 p.m.	Atlanta Falcons			U.S. Bank Stadium	Fox	
13	December 6	3:25 p.m.	Carolina Panthers			U.S. Bank Stadium	CBS	
14	December 10	7:15 p.m.	at New England Patriots			Gillette Stadium	Prime Video	
15	December 20	7:20 p.m.	**Detroit Lions**			U.S. Bank Stadium	NBC	
16	December 26/27	TBD	Washington Commanders			U.S. Bank Stadium	TBD	
17	January 3	12:00 p.m.	at New York Jets			MetLife Stadium	CBS	
18	January 9/10	TBD	**Chicago Bears**			U.S. Bank Stadium	TBD	

Notes

- Intra-division opponents are in **bold** text.
- Networks, dates and times for games in Weeks 13, 15 and 17 are subject to change as a result of flexible scheduling.
- The date, time and network for Week 16 will be finalized by no later than the end of Week 14.
- The date, time and network for Week 18 will be finalized at the end of Week 17.

=== Game summaries ===
==== Week 1: vs. Green Bay Packers ====
Week 1: Green Bay Packers at Minnesota Vikings – Game summary

Quarter	1	2	3	4	Total
Packers	9	10	3	0	**22**
**Vikings**	3	7	7	22	**39**

at U.S. Bank Stadium, Minneapolis, Minnesota

- Date: September 13
- Game time: 3:25 p.m. CDT
- Game weather: None (indoor stadium)
- Game attendance: 66,940
- Referee: Shawn Hochuli (83)
- TV announcers (CBS): Jim Nantz, J. J. Watt and Tracy Wolfson
- Recap, Game Book

Game information

**First quarter**

- GB – Trey Smack 59-yard field goal, 12:11. Packers 3–0. **Drive: 6 plays, 12 yards, 2:03.**
- GB – Christian Watson 81-yard pass from Jordan Love (kick failed, wide right), 7:43. Packers 9–0. **Drive: 2 plays, 81 yards, 0:13.**
- MIN – Will Reichard 38-yard field goal, 1:38. Packers 9–3. **Drive: 12 plays, 50 yards, 6:05.**

**Second quarter**

- GB – Trey Smack 43-yard field goal, 13:52. Packers 12–3. **Drive: 7 plays, 15 yards, 2:46.**
- MIN – Justin Jefferson 39-yard pass from Carson Wentz (Will Reichard kick), 1:55. Packers 12–10. **Drive: 7 plays, 85 yards, 3:23.**
- GB – Christian Watson 2-yard pass from Jordan Love (Trey Smack kick), 0:14. Packers 19–10. **Drive: 7 plays, 74 yards, 1:41.**

**Third quarter**

- GB – Trey Smack 26-yard field goal, 5:09. Packers 22–10. **Drive: 12 plays, 79 yards, 5:46.**
- MIN – T. J. Hockenson 16-yard pass from Carson Wentz (Will Reichard kick), 2:08. Packers 22–17. **Drive: 6 plays, 28 yards, 3:01.**

**Fourth quarter**

- MIN – Aaron Jones 3-yard run (Carson Wentz–Justin Jefferson pass), 6:37. Vikings 25–22. **Drive: 9 plays, 83 yards, 6:34.**
- MIN – Jordan Mason 1-yard run (Will Reichard kick), 4:48. Vikings 32–22. **Drive: 1 play, 1 yard, 0:04.**
- MIN – Justin Jefferson 9-yard pass from Carson Wentz (Will Reichard kick), 3:55. Vikings 39–22. **Drive: 3 plays, 14 yards, 0:18.**

**Top passers**

- GB – Jordan Love – 21/42, 387 yards, 2 TD, INT
- MIN – Carson Wentz – 12/19, 133 yards, 3 TD

**Top rushers**

- GB – MarShawn Lloyd – 13 rushes, 37 yards
- MIN – Jordan Mason – 15 rushes, 59 yards, TD

**Top receivers**

- GB – Christian Watson – 6 receptions, 147 yards, 2 TD
- MIN – Justin Jefferson – 8 receptions, 92 yards, 2 TD

The Vikings struggled right out the gate, trailing 22–10 in the third quarter. Quarterback Kyler Murray threw an interception with his first pass for the team and was knocked out of the game with a concussion in the first quarter after taking a blow to the helmet from Packers safety Javon Bullard, forcing backup quarterback Carson Wentz to step in. With the Vikings down 22–17 early in the fourth quarter, Packers kicker Trey Smack converted a 40-yard field goal on 4th-and-6 that would have extended their lead to eight points; however, the Vikings had committed an offside penalty that made it 4th-and-1, prompting Packers coach Matt LaFleur to go for it, only for Jordan Love to be stopped short on a quarterback sneak. The Vikings went on to score 22 points in the final 13 minutes thanks to an extended touchdown drive in which the Packers' defense was flagged several times, and Jordan Love losing a fumble and throwing an interception giving them a total of 29 unanswered points to win the game, their third straight victory in season openers.

==== Week 2: at Chicago Bears ====
Week 2: Minnesota Vikings at Chicago Bears – Game summary

Quarter	1	2	3	4	Total
**Vikings**	3	3	0	3	**9**
Bears	3	0	0	0	**3**

at Soldier Field, Chicago, Illinois

- Date: September 20
- Game time: 12:00 p.m. CDT
- Game weather: Rain, 68 °F (20 °C)
- Game attendance: 58,914
- Referee: Land Clark (130)
- TV announcers (Fox): Joe Davis, Greg Olsen and Pam Oliver
- Recap, Game Book

Game information

**First quarter**

- MIN – Will Reichard 35-yard field goal, 11:03. Vikings 3–0. **Drive: 9 plays, 55 yards, 3:57.**
- CHI – Cairo Santos 50-yard field goal, 5:03. Tied 3–3. **Drive: 9 plays, 37 yards, 6:00.**

**Second quarter**

- MIN – Will Reichard 49-yard field goal, 8:18. Vikings 6–3. **Drive: 11 plays, 33 yards, 5:45.**

**Third quarter**

- No scoring plays

**Fourth quarter**

- MIN – Will Reichard 39-yard field goal, 1:09. Vikings 9–3. **Drive: 11 plays, 67 yards, 5:12.**

**Top passers**

- MIN – Carson Wentz – 11/20, 143 yards
- CHI – Caleb Williams – 15/26, 138 yards, INT

**Top rushers**

- MIN – Aaron Jones – 23 rushes, 105 yards
- CHI – Kyle Monangai – 10 rushes, 47 yards

**Top receivers**

- MIN – Justin Jefferson – 3 receptions, 55 yards
- CHI – D'Andre Swift – 5 receptions, 54 yards

The game proved to be a slow scoring day for both teams despite the Bears putting up 59 points on the Panthers the week prior due to the rainy weather and mistakes both offenses made on the ball. Despite having and moving the ball more, the Bears were unable to put up more than a field goal due to Caleb Williams throwing an interception to Byron Murphy, Jalen Redmond forcing a fumble out of D'Andre Swift near the endzone, and Isaiah Rodgers blocking a field goal attempt. After Williams suffered a non-contact hamstring injury late in the fourth quarter, Dallas Turner sacked backup Tyson Bagent to end the game.

==== Week 3: at Tampa Bay Buccaneers ====
Week 3: Minnesota Vikings at Tampa Bay Buccaneers – Game summary

Quarter	1	2	3	4	Total
**Vikings**	10	7	0	6	**23**
Buccaneers	7	3	3	3	**16**

at Raymond James Stadium, Tampa, Florida

- Date: September 27
- Game time: 4:05 p.m. EDT/3:05 p.m. CDT
- Game weather: Cloudy, 84 °F (29 °C)
- Game attendance: 61,212
- Referee: Scott Novak (1)
- TV announcers (Fox): Kenny Albert, Jonathan Vilma and Megan Olivi
- Recap, Game Book

Game information

**First quarter**

- MIN – Will Reichard 54-yard field goal, 10:20. Vikings 3–0. **Drive: 7 plays, 40 yards, 4:40.**
- MIN – Myles Price 86-yard punt return, 8:43. Vikings 10–0.
- TB – Ted Hurst 40-yard pass from Baker Mayfield (Chase McLaughlin kick), 6:44. Vikings 10–7. **Drive: 5 plays, 80 yards, 1:59.**

**Second quarter**

- TB – Chase McLaughlin 28-yard field goal, 5:33. Tied 10–10. **Drive: 7 plays, 42 yards, 4:33.**
- MIN – Jordan Addison 41-yard pass from Kyler Murray (Will Reichard kick), 4:11. Vikings 17–10. **Drive: 4 plays, 73 yards, 1:22.**

**Third quarter**

- TB – Chase McLaughlin 38-yard field goal, 7:12. Vikings 17–13. **Drive: 4 plays, 2 yards, 1:23.**

**Fourth quarter**

- TB – Chase McLaughlin 54-yard field goal, 9:02. Vikings 17–16. **Drive: 8 plays, 30 yards, 4:21.**
- MIN – Will Reichard 56-yard field goal, 3:10. Vikings 20–16. **Drive: 11 plays, 17 yards, 5:52.**
- MIN – Will Reichard 43-yard field goal, 0:33. Vikings 23–16. **Drive: 5 plays, 16 yards, 1:06.**

**Top passers**

- MIN – Kyler Murray – 15/29, 168 yards, TD, INT
- TB – Baker Mayfield – 17/34, 217 yards, TD, INT

**Top rushers**

- MIN – Aaron Jones – 17 rushes, 58 yards
- TB – Bucky Irving – 15 rushes, 46 yards

**Top receivers**

- MIN – Jordan Addison – 5 receptions, 90 yards, TD
- TB – Emeka Egbuka – 5 receptions, 62 yards

With Kyler Murray's first full game after his concussion, both teams struggled offensively, as the Vikings held onto an early lead thanks to an 86-yard punt return from Myles Price and 41-yard touchdown pass to Jordan Addison and maintained the lead thanks to field goal kicks from Will Reichard. Buccaneers quarterback Baker Mayfield faced repeated pressure and eventually went down with an injury in the fourth quarter. Interceptions from both him and his backup Jalon Daniels in the climax sealed the game.

==== Week 4: vs. Miami Dolphins ====
Week 4: Miami Dolphins at Minnesota Vikings – Game summary

Quarter	1	2	3	4	Total
Dolphins	0	0	10	0	**10**
**Vikings**	3	6	3	3	**15**

at U.S. Bank Stadium, Minneapolis, Minnesota

- Date: October 4
- Game time: 3:05 p.m. CDT
- Game weather: None (indoor stadium)
- Game attendance: 66,752
- Referee: Adrian Hill (29)
- TV announcers (Fox): Kevin Kugler, Daryl Johnston and Allison Williams
- Recap, Game Book

Game information

**First quarter**

- MIN – Will Reichard 47-yard field goal, 7:54. Vikings 3–0. **Drive: 6 plays, 9 yards, 2:57.**

**Second quarter**

- MIN – Will Reichard 50-yard field goal, 7:08. Vikings 6–0. **Drive: 10 plays, 50 yards, 5:07.**
- MIN – Will Reichard 33-yard field goal, 0:00. Vikings 9–0. **Drive: 10 plays, 61 yards, 2:43.**

**Third quarter**

- MIA – Riley Patterson 27-yard field goal, 11:56. Vikings 9–3. **Drive: 7 plays, 60 yards, 3:04.**
- MIN – Will Reichard 41-yard field goal, 6:35. Vikings 12–3. **Drive: 10 plays, 42 yards, 5:21.**
- MIA – Ollie Gordon II 12-yard run (Riley Patterson kick), 0:11. Vikings 12–10. **Drive: 4 plays, 55 yards, 1:41.**

**Fourth quarter**

- MIN – Will Reichard 29-yard field goal, 6:41. Vikings 15–10. **Drive: 15 plays, 60 yards, 8:30.**

**Top passers**

- MIA – Malik Willis – 9/17, 85 yards
- MIN – Kyler Murray – 27/37, 247 yards

**Top rushers**

- MIA – Ollie Gordon II – 9 rushes, 100 yards, TD
- MIN – Aaron Jones – 20 rushes, 94 yards

**Top receivers**

- MIA – Malik Washington – 5 receptions, 67 yards
- MIN – T. J. Hockenson – 13 receptions, 119 yards

The Vikings opened the season to a 4–0 start despite not scoring an offensive touchdown in two of their first four games, making them the first team to accomplish this feat since the 1934 Lions. After struggling with targets in the first half, Kyler Murray got the offense rolling in the second half thanks to connecting more with tight end T. J. Hockenson, who stops short of the endzone at the two-minute marker after the Dolphins used up all of their timeouts due to the Vikings dominating time of possession, sealing the game.

==== Week 5: at New Orleans Saints ====
Week 5: Minnesota Vikings at New Orleans Saints – Game summary

Quarter	1	2	3	4	Total
**Vikings**	3	3	7	10	**23**
Saints	0	7	6	0	**13**

at Caesars Superdome, New Orleans, Louisiana

- Date: October 11
- Game time: 12:00 p.m. CDT
- Game weather: None (indoor stadium)
- Game attendance: 70,006
- Referee: John Hussey (35)
- TV announcers (Fox): Adam Amin, Drew Brees and Kristina Pink
- Recap, Game Book

Game information

**First quarter**

- MIN – Will Reichard 40-yard field goal, 9:04. Vikings 3–0. **Drive: 9 plays, 51 yards, 5:56.**

**Second quarter**

- NO – Kendre Miller 2-yard run (Daniel Carlson kick), 8:23. Saints 7–3. **Drive: 15 plays, 66 yards, 7:18.**
- MIN – Will Reichard 54-yard field goal, 0:00. Saints 7–6. **Drive: 7 plays, 33 yards, 1:49.**

**Third quarter**

- MIN – Justin Jefferson 15-yard pass from Kyler Murray (Will Reichard kick), 12:06. Vikings 13–7. **Drive: 6 plays, 37 yards, 2:47.**
- NO – Jonas Sanker 87-yard fumble return (kick failed, wide left), 2:34. Tied 13–13.

**Fourth quarter'**

- MIN – Aaron Jones 8-yard run (Will Reichard kick), 14:06. Vikings 20–13. **Drive: 6 plays, 70 yards, 3:28.**
- MIN – Will Reichard 55-yard field goal, 7:01. Vikings 23–13. **Drive: 9 plays, 31 yards, 5:48.**

**Top passers**

- MIN – Kyler Murray – 24/30, 229 yards, TD
- NO – Tyler Shough – 16/25, 96 yards, 2 INT

**Top rushers**

- MIN – Aaron Jones – 25 rushes, 113 yards, TD
- NO – Kendre Miller – 10 rushes, 30 yards, TD

**Top receivers**

- MIN – Justin Jefferson – 6 receptions, 79 yards, TD
- NO – Chris Olave – 4 receptions, 46 yards

After weeks of struggling offensively, the Vikings had one their better performances as a whole team, as Kyler Murray was more accurate to his receivers and scrambled frequently to gain extra yardage and first downs. Highlights included Justin Jefferson catching a touchdown in triple coverage in his home state, Aaron Jones rushing leading a touchdown drive, and the defense repeatedly pressuring Saints quarterback Tyler Shough which led to two interceptions from Byron Murphy. The Saints' only points in the game were a result of two fumbles the Vikings had near the end zone.

==== Week 7: vs. Indianapolis Colts ====
Week 7: Indianapolis Colts at Minnesota Vikings – Game summary

Quarter	1	2	3	4	Total
Colts	7	3	0	0	**10**
**Vikings**	0	6	0	10	**16**

at U.S. Bank Stadium, Minneapolis, Minnesota

- Date: October 25
- Game time: 12:00 p.m. CDT
- Game weather: None (indoor stadium)
- Game attendance: 66,934
- Referee: Brad Rogers (126)
- TV announcers (CBS): Ian Eagle, Ross Tucker and Evan Washburn
- Recap, Game Book

Game information

**First quarter**

- IND – Jonathan Taylor 38-yard run (Spencer Shrader kick), 9:13. Colts 7–0. **Drive: 7 plays, 61 yards, 3:33.**

**Second quarter**

- MIN – Will Reichard 28-yard field goal, 14:52. Colts 7–3. **Drive: 15 plays, 53 yards, 6:21.**
- MIN – Will Reichard 47-yard field goal, 6:37. Colts 7–6. **Drive: 12 plays, 67 yards, 5:27.**
- IND – Spencer Shrader 43-yard field goal, 0:00. Colts 10–6. **Drive: 16 plays, 29 yards, 6:37.**

**Third quarter**

- No scoring plays.

**Fourth quarter**

- MIN – T. J. Hockenson 5-yard pass from Kyler Murray (Will Reichard kick), 14:36. Vikings 13–10. **Drive: 6 plays, 54 yards, 2:39.**
- MIN – Will Reichard 52-yard field goal, 1:39. Vikings 16–10. **Drive: 7 plays, 28 yards, 2:43.**

**Top passers**

- IND – Daniel Jones – 13/22, 108 yards, INT
- MIN – Kyler Murray – 14/24, 150 yards, TD

**Top rushers**

- IND – Jonathan Taylor – 18 rushes, 95 yards, TD
- MIN – Jordan Mason – 15 rushes, 68 yards

**Top receivers**

- IND – Keenan Allen – 3 receptions, 31 yards
- MIN – Justin Jefferson – 4 receptions, 44 yards

After their bye week, the Vikings once again struggled offensively as they had early issues establishing the run game and Murray and the offensive line faced strong opposition from the Colts' defense. The Colts took an early lead thanks to a rushing touchdown from Jonathan Taylor, but a 30 yard scramble from Murray and touchdown pass to T. J. Hockenson put them in the lead early in the fourth quarter. Will Reichard set a new franchise record with 36 consecutive field goals, but was unable to go beyond it as his third field goal attempt in the game was blocked. The Vikings maintained the lead thanks to two missed field goals from Spencer Shrader, and 2024 practice squad quarterback Daniel Jones threw a game sealing interception to Harrison Smith, making him the third player in NFL history to record 40+ interceptions and 20+ sacks in a career.

With the win, the Vikings started 6–0 for the first time since 2009. The Vikings also became the final undefeated team in the NFL after the San Francisco 49ers lost to the Atlanta Falcons that same afternoon, and the Kansas City Chiefs lost to the Seattle Seahawks later that night.

==== Week 8: at Detroit Lions ====
Week 8: Minnesota Vikings at Detroit Lions – Game summary

Quarter	1	2	3	4	Total
Vikings	0	7	0	8	**15**
**Lions**	3	3	6	7	**19**

at Ford Field, Detroit, Michigan

- Date: November 1
- Game time: 1:00 p.m. EST/12:00 p.m. CST
- Game weather: None (indoor stadium)
- Game attendance: 64,008
- Referee: Craig Wrolstad (4)
- TV announcers (Fox): Kevin Burkhardt, Tom Brady, Erin Andrews and Tom Rinaldi
- Recap, Game Book

Game information

**First quarter**

- DET – Jake Bates 25-yard field goal, 2:18. Lions 3–0. **Drive: 12 plays, 57 yards, 5:03.**

**Second quarter**

- MIN – Justin Jefferson 1-yard pass from Kyler Murray (Will Reichard kick), 14:25. Vikings 7–6. **Drive: 7 plays, 74 yards, 2:53.**
- DET – Jake Bates 37-yard field goal, 0:02. Vikings 7–6. **Drive: 7 plays, 43 yards, 1:45.**

**Third quarter**

- DET – Jahmyr Gibbs 30-yard run (run failed), 4:40. Lions 12–7. **Drive: 6 plays, 72 yards, 2:53.**

**Fourth quarter**

- MIN – T. J. Hockenson 8-yard pass from Kyler Murray (Kyler Murray–Jordan Addison pass), 8:44. Vikings 15–12. **Drive: 7 plays, 84 yards, 3:56.**
- DET – Jameson Williams 7-yard pass from Jared Goff (Jake Bates kick), 4:35. Lions 19–15. **Drive: 7 plays, 69 yards, 4:09.**

**Top passers**

- MIN – Kyler Murray – 17/29, 210 yards, 2 TD, INT
- DET – Jared Goff – 18/25, 176 yards, TD, INT

**Top rushers**

- MIN – Kyler Murray – 4 rushes, 35 yards
- DET – Jahmyr Gibbs – 23 rushes, 153 yards, TD

**Top receivers**

- MIN – Jordan Addison – 3 receptions, 66 yards
- DET – Jameson Williams – 4 receptions, 70 yards, TD

The Vikings' winning streak came to an end in Detroit. Though the defense was able to sack Jared Goff four times and make him throw his first interception of the season, the offense only scored one touchdown in the first half after struggling to move the ball forward and Murray throwing a costly interception near the end of the second quarter. In the second half, the Lions dominated time of possession and were able to evade their defense by relying more on their running backs, Jahmyr Gibbs and Sione Vaki. Though the Vikings did retake the lead with a touchdown midway through the fourth quarter, the Lions' run game wore the defense down and retook the lead, with the Vikings unable to respond. With the loss, the Vikings fell to 6–1 and also became the final undefeated team in the NFL to fall.

==== Week 9: vs. Buffalo Bills ====
Week 9: Buffalo Bills at Minnesota Vikings – Game summary

Quarter	1	2	3	4	Total
**Bills**	3	7	3	10	**23**
Vikings	0	6	0	0	**6**

at U.S. Bank Stadium, Minneapolis, Minnesota

- Date: November 9
- Game time: 7:15 p.m. CST
- Game weather: None (indoor stadium)
- Game attendance: 66,955
- Referee: Carl Cheffers (51)
- TV announcers (ESPN/ABC): Joe Buck, Troy Aikman and Lisa Salters
- Recap, Game Book

Game information

**First quarter**

- BUF – Tyler Bass 39-yard field goal, 1:57. Bills 3–0. **Drive: 7 plays, 23 yards, 3:30.**

**Second quarter**

- MIN – Will Reichard 43-yard field goal, 4:02. Tied 3–3. **Drive: 4 plays, 9 yards, 1:34.**
- BUF – Keleki Latu 25-yard pass from Josh Allen (Tyler Bass kick), 0:44. Bills 10–3. **Drive: 8 plays, 80 yards, 3:18.**
- MIN – Will Reichard 53-yard field goal, 0:05. Bills 10–6. **Drive: 7 plays, 46 yards, 0:39.**

**Third quarter**

- BUF – Tyler Bass 25-yard field goal, 6:03. Bills 13–6. **Drive: 14 plays, 83 yards, 7:08.**

**Fourth quarter**

- BUF – James Cook 5-yard run (Tyler Bass kick), 6:17. Bills 20–6. **Drive: 15 plays, 84 yards, 8:32.**
- BUF – Tyler Bass 52-yard field goal, 4:40. Bills 23–6. **Drive: 4 plays, 7 yards, 0:58.**

**Top passers**

- BUF – Josh Allen – 21/31, 234 yards, TD, INT
- MIN – Carson Wentz – 8/25, 81 yards, 2 INT

**Top rushers**

- BUF – James Cook – 31 rushes, 107 yards, TD
- MIN – Jordan Mason – 6 rushes, 35 yards

**Top receivers**

- BUF – Khalil Shakir – 4 receptions, 58 yards
- MIN – Justin Jefferson – 3 receptions, 58 yards

Murray suffered a hamstring injury in the previous game, so Wentz started for the team once more. Despite the defense doing well to hold one of the highest ranked offenses in the league and getting four sacks and an interception on Josh Allen, the offense failed to capitalize on opportunities given to them. Wentz committed three turnovers by fumbling the ball and throwing two interceptions with an overall QB rating of 8.9, one of the lowest performances in the franchise's history.

Following weeks of inconsistent quarterback play, the Vikings agreed to trade a 2027 third-round draft pick to the Las Vegas Raiders for their former quarterback, Kirk Cousins, right before the trade deadline.

==== Week 10: at Green Bay Packers ====
Week 10: Minnesota Vikings at Green Bay Packers – Game summary

Quarter	1	2	3	4	Total
**Vikings**	10	7	3	10	**30**
Packers	0	0	10	0	**10**

at Lambeau Field, Green Bay, Wisconsin

- Date: November 15
- Game time: 12:00 p.m. CST
- Game weather: Sunny, 45 °F (7 °C)
- Game attendance: 78,332
- Referee: Clete Blakeman (34)
- TV announcers (Fox): Adam Amin, Drew Brees and Kristina Pink
- Recap, Game Book

Game information

**First quarter**

- MIN – Will Reichard 34-yard field goal, 10:20. Vikings 3–0. **Drive: 4 plays, -6 yards, 2:21.**
- MIN – Myles Price 38-yard pass from Kirk Cousins (Will Reichard kick), 2:46. Vikings 10–0. **Drive: 7 plays, 57 yards, 3:14.**

**Second quarter**

- MIN – Aaron Jones 1-yard run (Will Reichard kick), 6:17. Vikings 17–0. **Drive: 11 plays, 55 yards, 5:22.**

**Third quarter**

- MIN – Will Reichard 32-yard field goal, 10:02. Vikings 20–0. **Drive: 5 plays, 13 yards, 2:08.**
- GB – J. Michael Sturdivant 32-yard pass from Jordan Love (Trey Smack kick), 5:37. Vikings 20–7. **Drive: 10 plays, 75 yards, 4:25.**
- GB – Trey Smack 40-yard field goal, 0:19. Vikings 20–10. **Drive: 11 plays, 64 yards, 3:38.**

**Fourth quarter**

- MIN – Gavin Bartholomew 20-yard pass from Kirk Cousins (Will Reichard kick), 8:29. Vikings 27–10. **Drive: 11 plays, 75 yards, 6:50.**
- MIN – Will Reichard 20-yard field goal, 3:56. Vikings 30–10. **Drive: 9 plays, 33 yards, 4:28.**

**Top passers**

- MIN – Kirk Cousins – 21/31, 207 yards, 2 TD, INT
- GB – Jordan Love – 17/27, 220 yards, TD, INT

**Top rushers**

- MIN – Jordan Mason – 16 rushes, 59 yards
- GB – Kaleb Johnson – 10 rushes, 42 yards

**Top receivers**

- MIN – Justin Jefferson – 9 receptions, 74 yards
- GB – Matthew Golden – 5 receptions, 70 yards

Kirk Cousins' first start of his second stint with the Vikings was at Lambeau Field, the last place he played for the team before tearing his Achilles in 2023. Despite being down several key offensive players, the Vikings dominated their division rival with more consistent quarterback play, a high pressure defense that sacked Jordan Love eight times, and capitalized on several key mistakes the Packers made in offense and special teams, including a takeaway from Andrew Van Ginkel, interception from Smith in the red zone, a botched snap fumble recovery from Turner, and a kickoff fumble recovery from Jake Golday. The Vikings swept the Packers for a second time in three seasons.

==== Week 11: at San Francisco 49ers ====
Mexico City Game

Week 11: Minnesota Vikings at San Francisco 49ers – Game summary

Quarter	1	2	3	4	Total
Vikings	0	0	0	0	**0**
49ers	0	0	0	0	**0**

at Estadio Azteca, Mexico City, Mexico

- Date: November 22
- Game time: 7:20 p.m. CST
- Referee: Alex Moore (49)
- TV announcers (NBC): Mike Tirico, Cris Collinsworth and Melissa Stark
- Preview

=== Standings ===
==== Division ====
NFC North
	W	L	T	PCT	DIV	CONF	PF	PA	STK
Detroit Lions	7	2	0	.778	2–0	4–1	257	199	W5
Minnesota Vikings	7	2	0	.778	3–1	5–1	176	126	W1
Chicago Bears	7	2	0	.778	0–2	5–2	241	184	W4
Green Bay Packers	6	4	0	.600	1–3	4–4	226	221	L1

==== Conference ====
NFC
Seed	Team	Division	W	L	T	PCT	DIV	CONF	SOS	SOV	STK
**Division leaders**
1	San Francisco 49ers	West	8	1	0	.889	3–0	5–1	.431	.448	W2
2 (Note: Detroit wins tie break over Minnesota and Chicago based on head-to-head record.)	Detroit Lions	North	7	2	0	.778	2–0	4–1	.459	.403	W5
3	New York Giants	East	5	3	1	.611	2–1–1	3–3–1	.353	.292	L1
4	Carolina Panthers	South	4	5	0	.444	2–1	4–3	.524	.405	W1
**Wild cards**
5 (Note: Minnesota wins tie break over Chicago based on head-to-head victory.)	Minnesota Vikings	North	7	2	0	.778	3–1	5–1	.518	.433	W1
6	Chicago Bears	North	7	2	0	.778	0–2	5–2	.442	.373	W4
7 (Note: Green Bay wins tie break over Seattle based on conference record. Division tie break was initially used to eliminate LA Rams (see below).)	Green Bay Packers	North	6	4	0	.600	1–3	4–4	.521	.439	L1
**In the hunt**
8 (Note: Seattle wins tie break over LA Rams based on division record.)	Seattle Seahawks	West	6	4	0	.600	2–1	2–3	.516	.397	W2
9	Los Angeles Rams	West	6	4	0	.600	1–2	4–2	.484	.339	W4
10	Dallas Cowboys	East	4	6	0	.400	2–1	2–5	.438	.321	L1
11	Washington Commanders	East	3	5	1	.389	2–2–1	3–4–1	.488	.482	W1
12 (Note: Tampa Bay wins tie break over New Orleans based on division record.)	Tampa Bay Buccaneers	South	3	6	0	.333	2–0	3–3	.588	.379	L1
13	New Orleans Saints	South	3	6	0	.333	0–2	1–4	.547	.534	L1
14 (Note: Atlanta wins tie break over Arizona based on conference record.)	Atlanta Falcons	South	3	7	0	.300	1–2	3–3	.598	.607	L3
15	Arizona Cardinals	West	3	7	0	.300	1–4	2–6	.595	.379	L2
16	Philadelphia Eagles	East	2	7	0	.222	1–3	1–6	.500	.250	L7

== Statistics ==
=== Team leaders ===
Category	Player(s)	Total
Passing yards	Kyler Murray	1,022
Passing touchdowns	Kyler Murray	5
Rushing yards	Aaron Jones	521
Rushing touchdowns	Aaron Jones	3
Receptions	Justin Jefferson	40
Receiving yards	Justin Jefferson	467
Receiving touchdowns	Justin Jefferson	4
Points	Will Reichard	82
Kickoff return yards	Myles Price	818
Punt return yards	Myles Price	262
Tackles	Blake Cashman	76
Sacks	Andrew Van Ginkel	8.5
Interceptions	Byron Murphy	4
Forced fumbles	Dallas Turner; Andrew Van Ginkel	2

Source: Pro-Football-Reference.com

=== League rankings ===
Category	Total yards	Yards per game	NFL rank (out of 32)
Passing offense	1,469	163.2	31st
Rushing offense	977	108.6	21st
Total offense	2,446	271.8	31st
Passing defense	1,453	161.4	1st
Rushing defense	1,007	111.9	14th
Total defense	2,460	273.3	2nd

Source: ProFootballReference.com
