= Will Reichard =

American football player (born 2001)

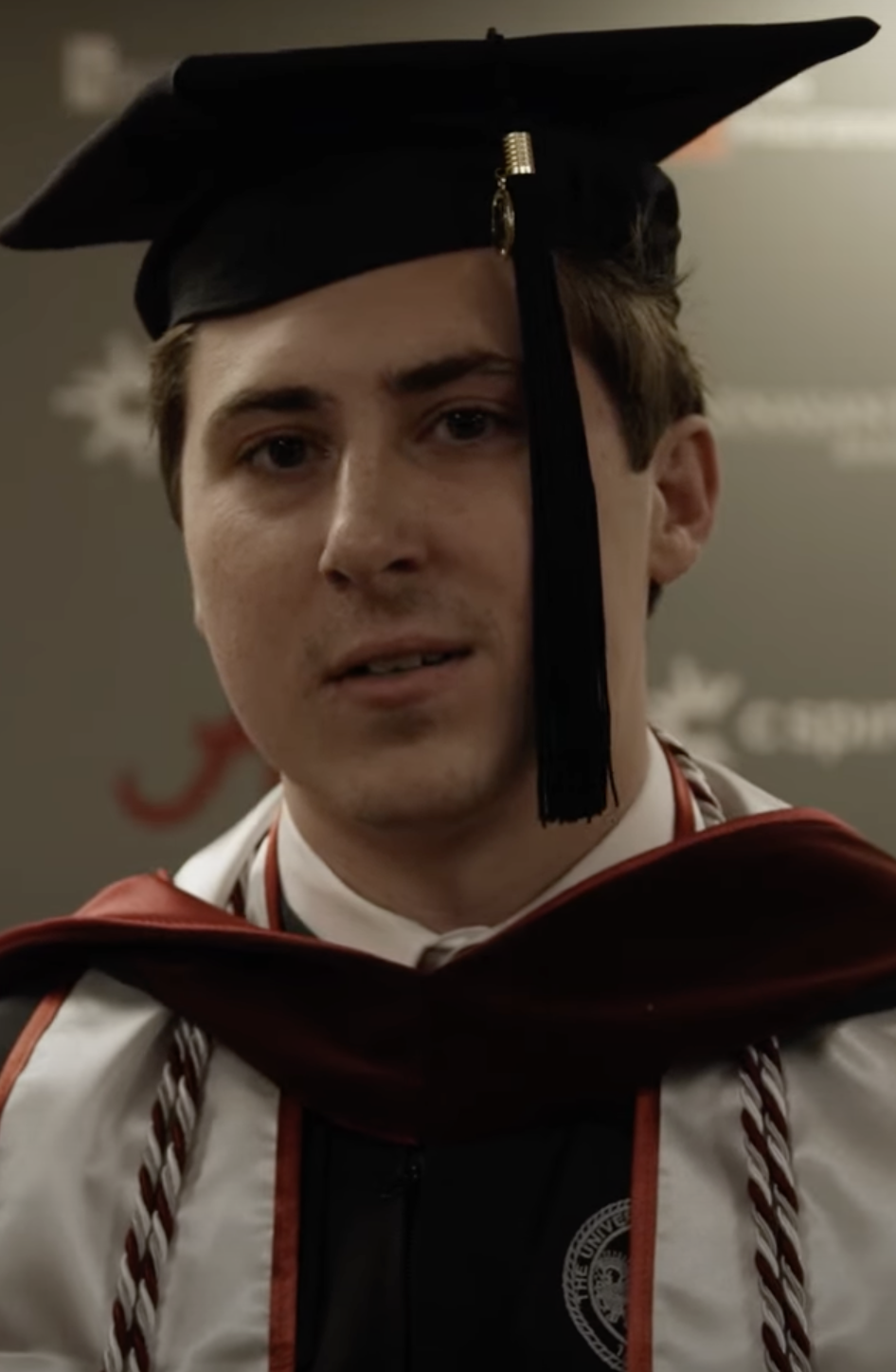
- Reichard in 2023

No. 16 – Minnesota Vikings
- Position: Placekicker
- Roster status: Active

Personal information
- Born: January 9, 2001 (age 25); Hoover, Alabama, U.S.
- Listed height: 6 ft 1 in (1.85 m)
- Listed weight: 190 lb (86 kg)

Career information
- High school: Hoover (AL)
- College: Alabama (2019–2023)
- NFL draft: 2024: 6th round, 203rd overall pick

Career history
- Minnesota Vikings (2024–present)

Awards and highlights
- First-team All-Pro (2025); CFP national champion (2020); 2× Second-team All-American (2020, 2023); SEC Special Teams Player of the Year (2023); First-team All-SEC (2023); Second-team All-SEC (2022); NCAA (FBS) record: Most career points scored: 547

Career NFL statistics as of Week 10, 2026
- Field goals made: 80
- Field goals attempted: 90
- Field goal percentage: 88.9%
- Extra points made: 82
- Extra points attempted: 82
- Extra point percentage: 100.0%
- Points scored: 322
- Longest field goal: 62
- Touchbacks: 82
- Stats at Pro Football Reference

Will Reichard (born January 9, 2001) is an American professional football placekicker for the Minnesota Vikings of the National Football League (NFL). He played college football for the Alabama Crimson Tide, becoming the all-time NCAA Division I FBS scoring leader.

== Early life ==
Reichard was born on January 9, 2001, and grew up in Hoover, Alabama. Starting in 6th grade, he attended Kohl's Kicking Camps each year and was eventually their number one ranked kicker and number two ranked punter. He attended Hoover High School in his hometown, and made 27-of-29 career field goal attempts and was perfect on extra points, making all 109 attempts. As a senior, Reichard was named to the USA Today All-USA high school football team and played in the Under Armour All-America Game. The nation's top kicker according to ESPN, he received scholarship offers from Auburn, LSU, Oklahoma, Alabama, Oregon, and Georgia, committing to Alabama.

== College career ==
=== 2019 ===
After committing to Alabama, Reichard won the starting placekicker position in training camp, and was given every kicking position to start his first career game. Playing against Duke in week one, he went perfect on 6 extra point attempts, punted twice for 81 yards, and had every kickoff result in a touchback. He missed the final half of the season following injuries, finishing the year 4-for-7 on field goals and 21-for-22 on extra points.

=== 2020 ===
As a sophomore in 2020, Reichard played in every game, and went a perfect 98-for-98 on field goals and extra points, becoming only the second Alabama player in history to accomplish that feat. He was named special teams player of the week after games against Texas A&M, LSU, Mississippi State, Georgia, and Tennessee. After placing fifth in the country with 126 points scored, Reichard was a first-team All-America selection by CBS Sports and a second-team pick by The Sporting News. He also was a finalist for the Lou Groza Award, given to the best kicker in the nation. His team went 13–0 that year, and were named national champions.

=== 2021 ===
As a junior in 2021, Reichard made 22 of 28 field goal attempts and all but one of his 72 extra point attempts, being the overall Southeastern Conference (SEC) leader in points scored and being ranked fifth nationally. He earned SEC Special Teams Player of the Week honors against Miami and also recorded 106 kickoffs for 6,264 yards (a 59.1 average) with 59 touchbacks.

=== 2022 ===
Reichard was a semifinalist for the Lou Groza Award in 2022 after being second in the SEC and third in the nation with 130 total points scored. He converted 22 of 26 field goal attempts and all 64 extra points, additionally totaling 95 kickoffs for 5,948 yards and 47 touchbacks, averaging 62.6 yards per. He twice earned SEC Special Teams Player of the Week honors and was named second-team All-SEC by Associated Press and league coaches and honorable mention All-American by Pro Football Focus. After initially deciding to enter the 2023 NFL draft, he changed his mind and opted to return for a fifth and final season at Alabama in 2023 after having had his eligibility extended a year due to the COVID-19 pandemic.

=== 2023 ===
On October 14, 2023, against the Arkansas Razorbacks, Reichard set the record for most points scored in Southeastern Conference history at 486, surpassing former Auburn kicker Daniel Carlson's 480. He scored nine points against Auburn in the Iron Bowl to tie Keenan Reynolds for the NCAA's all-time scoring mark with 530 points. The following week, he set the record with a field goal in Alabama's SEC Championship Game victory.

== Professional career ==
Pre-draft measurables
Height	Weight	Arm length	Hand span	Wingspan
6 ft 0 7/8 in (1.85 m)	187 lb (85 kg)	31 in (0.79 m)	8 1/2 in (0.22 m)	6 ft 1 5/8 in (1.87 m)
All values from NFL Combine

Reichard was selected by the Minnesota Vikings in the sixth round, 203rd overall, of the 2024 NFL draft. Over the first eight weeks of the 2024 season, Reichard made the first 14 field goal attempts of his career, before missing his next two in the Week 9 matchup against the Indianapolis Colts, in which he suffered a minor injury to his oblique muscle. He was placed on injured reserve on November 4, 2024. Reichard was activated on December 7. In Week 15 against the Chicago Bears, Reichard made all three of his field goal attempts as well as all three of his extra point attempts in the 30–12 victory, snapping a two-game streak in which he had missed all three of his prior field goal attempts.

In 2025, during the Vikings' Week 3 victory over the Cincinnati Bengals, Reichard kicked a 62-yard field goal, setting a new franchise record for the longest successful field goal attempt. In Week 5, one of Reichard’s kicks appeared to hit a Skycam wire, resulting in a miss (the NFL Rulebook calls for a retry of the kick in this situation, however the referees did not call for one). Reichard appealed to the NFL to remove the miss from his stats. After initially denying the ball hit the wire, the league later acknowledged that the ball did hit the wire, but would not be adjusting the stats. During the 2025 NFL season, Reichard missed only two field goal attempts (out of 35 attempts).

In week 4 of the 2026 season against the Miami Dolphins, Reichard posted all of Minnesota's points on a perfect 5-for-5 day on field goals and was named NFC Special Teams Player of the Week after the 15–10 win. In week 10 against the Green Bay Packers, Reichard helped the Vikings to win 30–10 with three field goals (34, 32 and 20 yards) and three extra points, scoring twelve points.

== Career statistics ==
Legend
**Bold**	Career high

=== NFL ===
==== Regular season ====
Year	Team	GP	Field goals				PATs			Kickoffs		Points
Year	Team	GP	FGM	FGA	Pct	Lng	XPM	XPA	Pct	KO	TB	Points
2024	MIN	13	24	30	80.0	58	**38**	**38**	**100.0**	74	**62**	110
2025	MIN	17	**33**	**35**	**94.3**	**62**	31	31	**100.0**	**83**	15	**130**
2026	MIN	9	23	25	92.0	56	13	13	**100.0**	45	5	82
Career		39	80	90	88.9	62	82	82	100.0	202	82	310

==== Postseason ====
Year	Team	GP	Field goals				PATs			Kickoffs		Points
Year	Team	GP	FGM	FGA	Pct	Lng	XPM	XPA	Pct	KO	TB	Points
2024	MIN	1	1	1	100.0	34	0	0	-	3	3	3
Career		1	1	1	100.0	34	0	0	-	3	3	3

=== College ===
Season	Team	GP	Field Goals			PATs			Points
Season	Team	GP	FGM	FGA	Pct	XPM	XPA	Pct	Points
2019	Alabama	5	4	7	57.1	21	22	95.5	33
2020	Alabama	13	14	14	**100.0**	**84**	**84**	**100.0**	126
2021	Alabama	15	**22**	**28**	78.6	71	72	98.6	**137**
2022	Alabama	13	**22**	26	84.6	64	64	**100.0**	130
2023	Alabama	14	**22**	25	88.0	55	55	**100.0**	121
Career		60	84	100	84.0	295	297	99.3	547

== Highlights and awards ==
=== Awards and Honors ===
==== NFL ====
- Named to 2025 first team NFL All Pro roster.

=== Records ===
==== NFL ====
- Vikings franchise record for longest successful field goal (Bengals at Vikings, September 21, 2025) – 62 yards

==== NCAA ====
- Most points scored by any NCAA player in a college career (547)

== Personal life ==
Reichard proposed to his high school sweetheart, Amelia Auchmuty on January 29, 2022. They were married January 21, 2023.
