= List of NCAA Division I FBS scoring leaders =

List of NCAA Division I FBS football scoring leaders

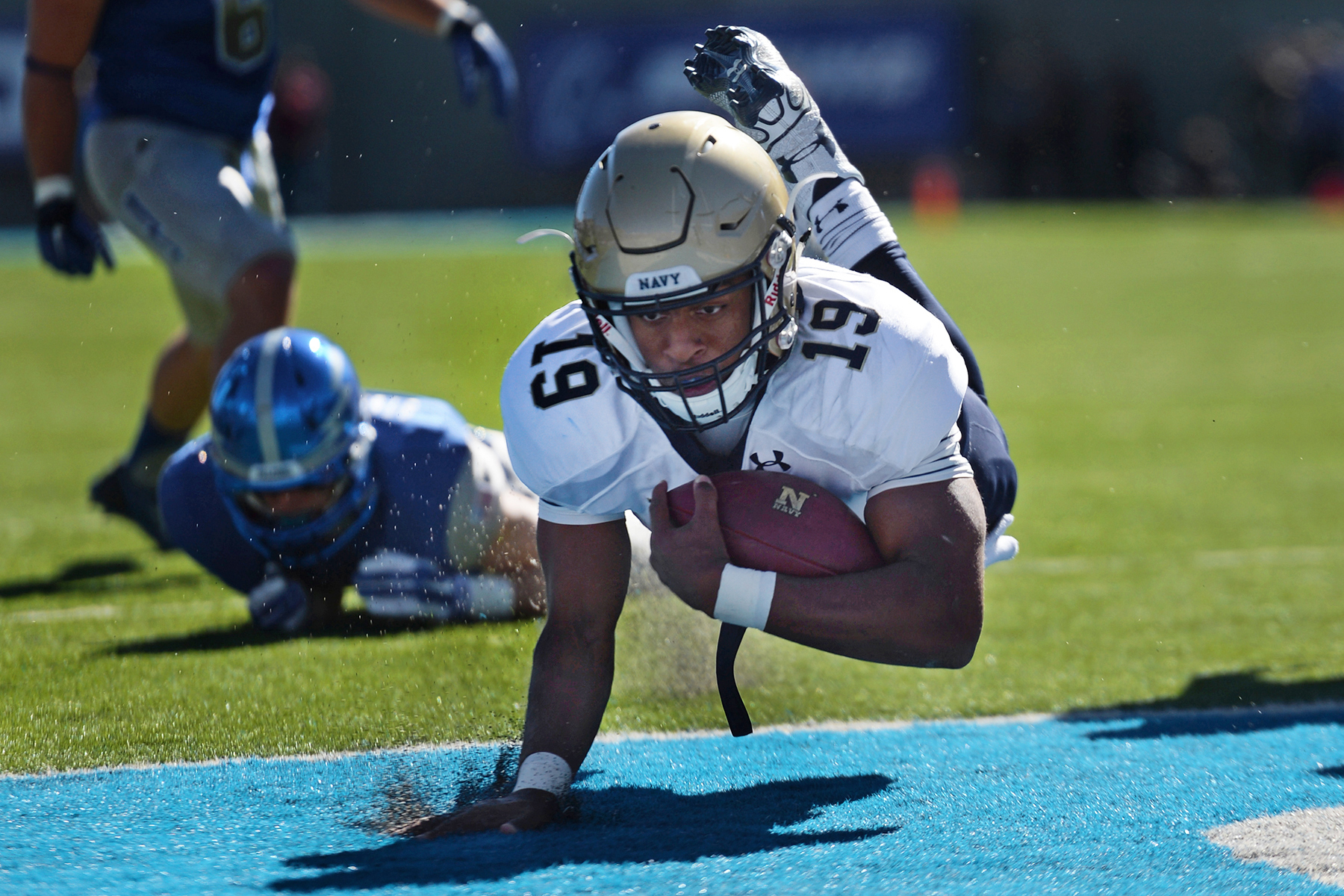
Keenan Reynolds of the Navy Midshipmen, the NCAA Division I FBS all-time leader in career rushing touchdowns and the highest-scoring non-kicker in FBS history.

This list ranks football players in the NCAA Division I Football Bowl Subdivision (FBS) and its predecessor divisions who are among the top 30 leaders in total points scored in a career or in a single season.

Points are awarded as follows: six points for a touchdown (rushing, receiving, or return touchdowns only; passing touchdowns excluded), three points for a field goal, two points for a two-point conversion (rushing or receiving), and one point for an extra point.

Under NCAA policy, statistics from bowl games played prior to the 2002 season are not included in these totals.

Because NCAA policy excludes statistics from bowl games played prior to the 2002 season, several notable single-season performances are not reflected in the official totals. Most notably, Barry Sanders scored five touchdowns in the 1988 Holiday Bowl, which are not included in his 1988 season statistics. If those points were counted, Sanders would rank first on the single-season scoring list.

Legend
Current record holder

Statistics are accurate as of the end of the 2025 NCAA Division I FBS football season.

== Division I FBS ==
=== Career ===
#	Player	Pts	Rush	Rec	PR	KR	FR	2PM	XPM	FGM	Seasons
1	Will Reichard	547							295	84	2019 2020 2021 2022 2023 Alabama
2	Keenan Reynolds	530	88					1			2012 2013 2014 2015 Navy
3	Kenneth Dixon	522	72	15							2012 2013 2014 2015 Louisiana Tech
4	Jonah Dalmas	508							229	93	2020 2021 2022 2023 2024 Boise State
5	Montee Ball	500	77	6				1			2009 2010 2011 2012 Wisconsin
6	Austin Seibert	499							310	63	2015 2016 2017 2018 Oklahoma
7	Zane Gonzalez	494						1	204	96	2013 2014 2015 2016 Arizona State
8	Christopher Dunn	491							200	97	2018 2019 2020 2021 2022 NC State
9	Daniel Carlson	480	1						198	92	2014 2015 2016 2017 Auburn
10	Travis Prentice	468	73	5							1996 1997 1998 1999 Miami (OH)
10	Travis Etienne	468	70	8							2017 2018 2019 2020 Clemson
12	Dustin Hopkins	466							202	88	2009 2010 2011 2012 Florida State
13	Chandler Staton	464							272	64	2017 2018 2019 2020 2021 Appalachian State
14	Jonathan Barnes	462							219	81	2014 2015 2016 2017 Louisiana Tech
15	Andre Szmyt	454							199	85	2018 2019 2020 2021 2022 Syracuse
16	B. T. Potter	453							234	73	2018 2019 2020 2021 2022 Clemson
17	Aaron Jones	451							274	59	2010 2011 2012 2013 Baylor
17	Jaden Oberkrom	451							214	79	2012 2013 2014 2015 TCU
19	Ricky Williams	450	72	3							1995 1996 1997 1998 Texas
19	Michael Hunnicutt	450		1					219	75	2011 2012 2013 2014 Oklahoma
21	Jameson Vest	446							230	72	2015 2016 2017 2018 Toledo
22	Jake Elliott	445							202	81	2013 2014 2015 2016 Memphis
22	Blake Grupe	445							211	78	2018 2019 2020 2021 Arkansas ᛫ 2022 Notre Dame
24	Rodrigo Blankenship	440							200	80	2016 2017 2018 2019 Georgia
25	Kyle Brotzman	439							238	67	2007 2008 2009 2010 Boise State

=== Single season ===
#	Player	Pts	Rush	Rec	PR	KR	FR	2PM	Season
1	Montee Ball	236	33	6				1	2011 Wisconsin
2	Barry Sanders	234	37		1	1			1988 Oklahoma State
3	Devin Singletary	198	32	1					2017 Florida Atlantic
4	Brock Forsey	192	26	6					2002 Boise State
4	Melvin Gordon	192	29	3					2014 Wisconsin
4	Jay Ajayi	192	28	4					2014 Boise State
4	Bryson Daily	192	32						2024 Army
8	Keenan Reynolds	188	31					1	2013 Navy
9	Troy Edwards	186	3	27	1				1998 Louisiana Tech
9	Kapri Bibbs	186	31						2013 Colorado State
11	Kevin Smith	180	29	1					2007 UCF
11	Najee Harris	180	26	4					2020 Alabama
11	Ashton Jeanty	180	29	1					2024 Boise State
14	Toby Gerhart	178	28				1	2	2009 Stanford
15	Terry Metcalf	174	28	1					1971 Long Beach State
15	Lydell Mitchell	174	26	3					1971 Penn State
15	Mike Rozier	174	29						1983 Nebraska
15	Anthony Wales	174	27	2					2016 Western Kentucky
15	Caleb Hawkins	174	25	4					2025 North Texas
20	Luke Staley	170	24	4				1	2001 BYU
21	Ricky Williams	168	27	1					1998 Texas
21	Lee Suggs	168	27	1					2000 Virginia Tech
21	Willis McGahee	168	28						2002 Miami (FL)
21	Kenneth Dixon	168	27	1					2012 Louisiana Tech
21	Kenneth Dixon	168	22	6					2014 Louisiana Tech
21	Derrick Henry	168	28						2015 Alabama
21	Rashaad Penny	168	23	2	1	2			2017 San Diego State
21	Blake Corum	168	27	1					2023 Michigan
