= 2026 Carolina Panthers season =

32nd season in franchise history

- Owner: David Tepper
- General manager: Dan Morgan
- President: Kristi Coleman
- Head coach: Dave Canales
- Offensive coordinator: Brad Idzik
- Defensive coordinator: Ejiro Evero (fired October 30, 3–4 record); Todd Wash (interim)
- Home stadium: Bank of America Stadium

Results
- Record: 5–5
- Division place: 1st NFC South

Uniform
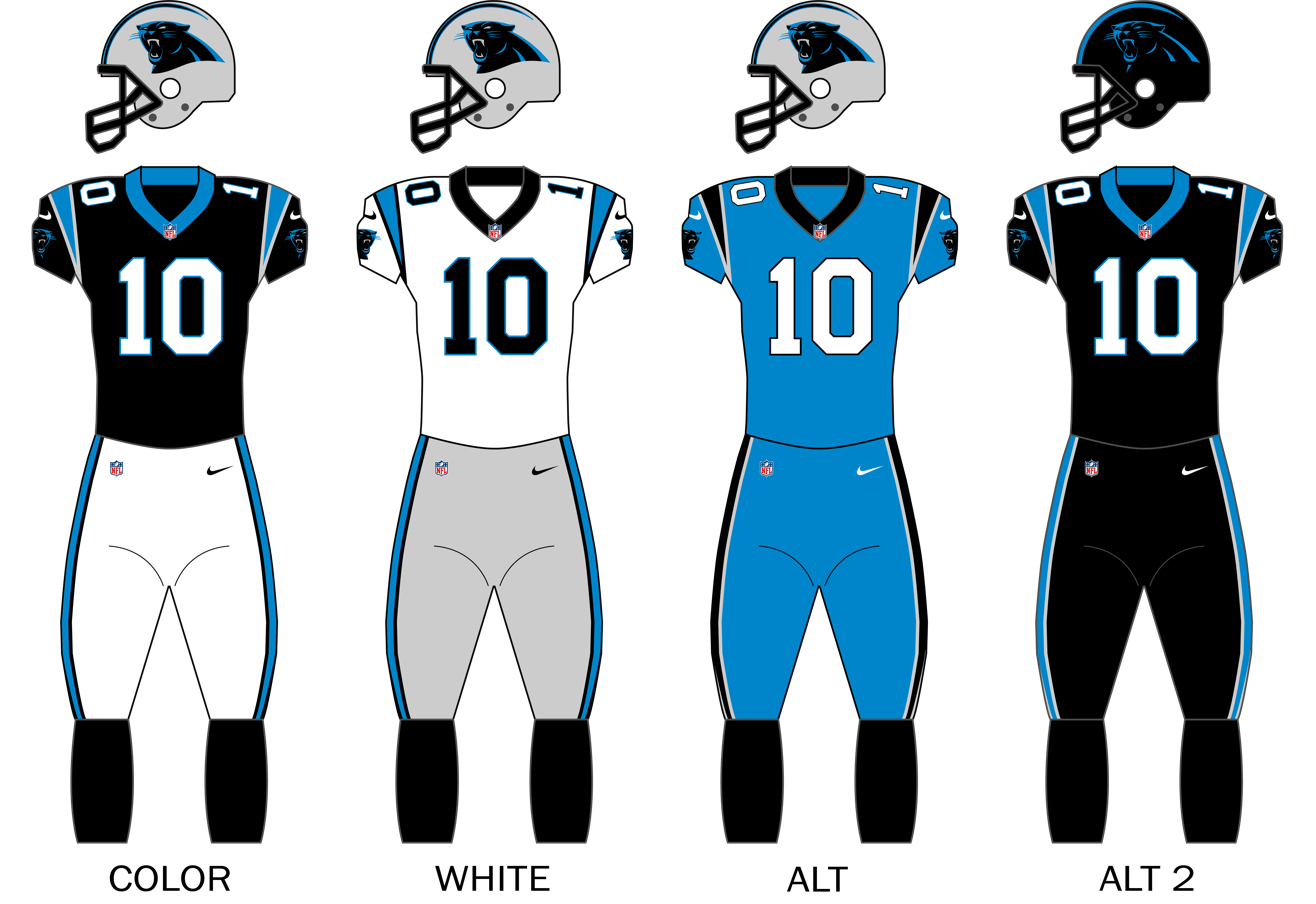

The 2026 season is the Carolina Panthers' 32nd in the National Football League (NFL) and their third under the tandem of general manager Dan Morgan and head coach Dave Canales. They will attempt to improve on their 8–9 record from 2025, make the playoffs and win the NFC South for the second consecutive season, and put an end to eight consecutive losing seasons.

On October 30, following a week eight defeat against the Green Bay Packers, the Panthers fired defensive coordinator Ejiro Evero, with Todd Wash subsequently becoming interim defensive coordinator.

== Offseason ==
=== Draft ===
2026 Carolina Panthers draft selections
Round	Selection	Player	Position	College	Notes
1	19	Monroe Freeling	OT	Georgia	
2	49	Lee Hunter	DT	Texas Tech	From Minnesota (Note: Minnesota traded second- and sixth- round selections (49th and 196th overall) to Carolina in exchange for second- and fifth- round selections (51st and 159th overall)..)
2	51	Traded to the Minnesota Vikings			
3	83	Chris Brazzell II	WR	Tennessee	
4
4	119	Traded to the Jacksonville Jaguars (Note: Carolina traded fourth- and sixth-round selections (119th and 196th overall) to Jacksonville in exchange for fourth- and fifth- round selections (124th and 166th overall).)			
4	124	Traded to the Chicago Bears (Note: Carolina traded fourth- and fifth-round selections (124th and 166th overall) to Chicago in exchange for fourth- and fifth-round selections (129th and 144th overall).)			From Jacksonville
4	129	Will Lee III	CB	Texas A&M	From Chicago
5	144	Sam Hecht	C	Kansas State	From Tennessee via Chicago
5	151	Zakee Wheatley	S	Penn State	From Miami (Note: Miami traded fifth- and seventh-round selections (151st and 227th overall) to Carolina in exchange for fifth- and sixth-round selections (158th and 200th overall).)
5	158	Traded to the Miami Dolphins			From Minnesota (Note: Minnesota traded a fifth-round selection (158th overall) and a 2027 fourth-round selection to Carolina in exchange for a conditional seventh-round selection (235th overall), a 2027 fifth-round selection and WR Adam Thielen.)
5	159	Traded to the Minnesota Vikings			
5	166	Traded to the Chicago Bears			From Jacksonville
6
6	196	Traded to the Jacksonville Jaguars			From Minnesota
6	200	Traded to the Miami Dolphins			
7
7	227	Jackson Kuwatch	LB	Miami (OH)	From Miami
7	235	Traded to the Minnesota Vikings			

2026 Carolina Panthers undrafted free agents
Name	Position	College	Ref.
Haynes King	QB	Georgia Tech	
Jaylon Guilbeau	CB	Texas	
Aaron Hall	DT	Duke	
Isaia Glass	OT	Vanderbilt	
Cam Miller	CB	Rutgers	
Parker Peterson	DT	Wisconsin	
Kobe Prentice	WR	Baylor	
Albert Reese	OT	Mississippi State	
Devonta Smith	CB	Notre Dame	
Isaiah Smith	OLB	SMU	
Miles Davis	RB	Utah State	
Tywone Malone Jr.	DT	Ohio State	
Heinrich Haarberg	TE	Nebraska	

Draft trades

== Staff ==
Carolina Panthers staff
Front office: Owner – David Tepper; President – Kristi Coleman; President of football operations/general manager – Dan Morgan; Executive vice president of football operations – Brandt Tilis; Vice president of football analytics – Eric Eager; Vice president of player development – Brian Decker; Director of pro scouting – Lee McNeill; Director of player personnel – Jared Kirksey; Assistant director of college scouting – Dave Whittington; Director of data science – Benjamin Brown; Director of football administration – Justin Davidov; Head coaches: Head coach – Dave Canales; Assistant head coach/run game coordinator – Harold Goodwin; Associate head coach/offensive specialist – Darrell Bevell; Offensive coaches: Offensive coordinator – Brad Idzik; Pass game coordinator – Mike Bercovici; Quarterbacks – Will Harriger; Running backs – Bernie Parmalee; Wide receivers – Rob Moore; Tight ends – Pat McPherson; Offensive line – Joe Gilbert; Offensive assistant – Keyshawn Colmon; Offensive assistant – Dean Petzing; Senior offensive consultant - Carl Smith	Defensive coaches: Interim defensive coordinator – Todd Wash; Assistant defensive coordinator/linebackers – Peter Hansen; Defensive line/outside linebackers – A.C. Carter; Assistant linebackers coach – Mayur Chaudhari; Secondary – Renaldo Hill; Defensive assistant – Ilir Emini; Defensive assistant – Kevin Peterson; Special teams coaches: Special teams coordinator – Tracy Smith; Assistant special teams coordinator – Daren Bates; Special teams/defensive assistant – Dwayne Stukes; Support staff: Head coach assistant and coaching operations manager – Jessica Beckenstein; Director of coaching development – Scott Cooper; Game management coordinator – George Li; Strength and conditioning: Strength and conditioning – Jeremy Scott; Strength and conditioning assistant/return to play coordinator – Thomas Barbeau; Human performance assistant – Timothy Rabas; → Coaching staff → Front office → More NFL staffs

== Current roster ==
Carolina Panthers roster
Quarterbacks (QB): 16 Haynes King; 12 Kenny Pickett; 9 Bryce Young; Running backs (RB): 28 A. J. Dillon; 23 Trevor Etienne; 30 Chuba Hubbard; 34 Anthony Tyus III; Wide receivers (WR): 18 Jalen Coker; 17 Xavier Legette; 4 Tetairoa McMillan; 13 John Metchie III RS; 87 Brycen Tremayne; Tight ends (TE): 84 Mitchell Evans; 81 Feleipe Franks; 0 Ja'Tavion Sanders; 82 Tommy Tremble; 88 Darren Waller	Offensive linemen (OL): 67 Corey Bullock G; 73 Stone Forsythe T; 77 Luke Fortner C; 57 Monroe Freeling T; 75 Sam Hecht C; 50 Robert Hunt G; 68 Damien Lewis G; 65 Torricelli Simpkins III G; 63 Rasheed Walker T; Defensive linemen (DL): 97 Bobby Brown III DT; 95 Derrick Brown DT; 93 TeRah Edwards DT; 94 Aaron Hall DT; 92 Lee Hunter DT; 98 Tershawn Wharton DT	Linebackers (LB): 33 Tyrel Dodson MLB; 52 Trevis Gipson OLB; 91 Patrick Jones II OLB; 46 Jackson Kuwatch MLB; 55 Devin Lloyd MLB; 54 Bam Martin-Scott MLB; 58 Bobby Okereke MLB; 5 Jaelan Phillips OLB; 3 Princely Umanmielen OLB; Defensive backs (DB): 36 Malcolm DeWalt CB; 2 Mike Jackson CB; 24 Will Lee III CB; 7 Tre'von Moehrig S; 22 Lathan Ransom S; 21 Nick Scott S; 26 Chau Smith-Wade CB; 20 Zakee Wheatley S; 35 Marco Wilson CB; Special teams (ST): 10 Ryan Fitzgerald K; 44 J. J. Jansen LS; 6 Sam Martin P	Practice squad: 32 Jakorian Bennett CB; 41 Caelen Carson CB; 78 Saahdiq Charles G; 53 Claudin Cherelus LB (PS/I); 74 Jake Curhan T; 39 Nick Hampton LB; 96 Cam Horsley DT; 37 Ahmani Marshall RB; 83 David Moore WR; 42 Mapalo Mwansa LB (IPP); 69 Parker Peterson DT; 86 Ja'seem Reed WR; 76 Albert Reese T; 40 Joshua Simon TE; 43 DeVonta Smith CB; 31 Corey Thornton CB; 85 Casey Washington WR; 47 Ja'Markis Weston LB; Reserve: 19 Chris Brazzell II WR (IR); 25 Jonathon Brooks RB (IR); 70 Brady Christensen G (IR); 79 Ikem Ekwonu T (PUP); 29 Akayleb Evans CB (IR); 8 Jaycee Horn CB (IR); 48 Thomas Incoom OLB (IR); 99 Cam Jackson DT (IR); 72 Taylor Moton T (IR); 11 Nic Scourton OLB (IR); 27 Isaiah Simmons S (IR) 53 active, 16 practice squad (1 IPP), 12 reserve As of November 22, 2026. Rookies in italics.; Roster; Depth chart; Transactions

== Preseason ==
Week	Date	Opponent	Result	Record	Venue	Recap
HOF	August 6	vs. Arizona Cardinals	W 33–30	1–0	Tom Benson Hall of Fame Stadium	Recap
1	August 15	at Buffalo Bills	L 14–29	1–1	Highmark Stadium	Recap
2	August 21	at Jacksonville Jaguars	W 34–17	2–1	EverBank Stadium	Recap
3	August 28	Houston Texans	W 16–13	3–1	Bank of America Stadium	Recap

== Regular season ==
=== Schedule ===
Week	Date	Time (ET)	Opponent	Result	Record	Venue	Network	Recap
1	September 13	1:00 p.m.	Chicago Bears	**L** 37–59	0–1	Bank of America Stadium	Fox	Recap
2	September 20	1:00 p.m.	at **Atlanta Falcons**	**W** 34–3	1–1	Mercedes-Benz Stadium	Fox	Recap
3	September 27	1:00 p.m.	at Cleveland Browns	**L** 18–21	1–2	Huntington Bank Field	Fox	Recap
4	October 4	8:20 p.m.	Detroit Lions	**W** 32–26	2–2	Bank of America Stadium	NBC	Recap
5	Bye							
6	October 18	1:00 p.m.	at Philadelphia Eagles	**W** 25–14	3–2	Lincoln Financial Field	CBS	Recap
7	October 25	1:00 p.m.	**Tampa Bay Buccaneers**	**L** 13–43	3–3	Bank of America Stadium	Fox	Recap
8	October 29	8:15 p.m.	at Green Bay Packers	**L** 19–27	3–4	Lambeau Field	Prime Video	Recap
9	November 8	1:00 p.m.	Denver Broncos	**L** 21–26	3–5	Bank of America Stadium	CBS	Recap
10	November 15	1:00 p.m.	at **New Orleans Saints**	**W** 20–17	4–5	Caesars Superdome	Fox	Recap
11	November 22	1:00 p.m.	Baltimore Ravens	**W** 35–33	5–5	Bank of America Stadium	Fox	Recap
12	November 30	8:15 p.m.	at **Tampa Bay Buccaneers**			Raymond James Stadium	ESPN	
13	December 6	4:25 p.m.	at Minnesota Vikings			U.S. Bank Stadium	CBS	
14	December 13	1:00 p.m.	**New Orleans Saints**			Bank of America Stadium	CBS	
15	December 20	1:00 p.m.	Cincinnati Bengals			Bank of America Stadium	Fox	
16	December 26/27	TBD	at Pittsburgh Steelers			Acrisure Stadium	TBD	
17	January 3	1:00 p.m.	Seattle Seahawks			Bank of America Stadium	Fox	
18	January 9/10	TBD	**Atlanta Falcons**			Bank of America Stadium	TBD	

Notes

- Intra-division opponents are in **bold** text.
- Networks, dates and times from Weeks 13–17 are subject to change as a result of flexible scheduling.
- The date, time and network for Week 16 will be finalized by no later than the end of Week 14.
- The date, time and network for Week 18 will be finalized at the end of Week 17.

=== Game summaries ===
==== Week 1: vs. Chicago Bears ====
Week 1: Chicago Bears at Carolina Panthers – Game summary

Quarter	1	2	3	4	Total
**Bears**	14	17	14	14	**59**
Panthers	7	17	7	6	**37**

at Bank of America Stadium, Charlotte, North Carolina

- Date: September 13
- Game time: 1:00 p.m. EDT
- Game weather: Sunny, 89 °F (32 °C)
- Game attendance: 72,597
- Referee: Brad Allen
- TV announcers (Fox): Adam Amin, Drew Brees and Kristina Pink
- Recap, Game Book

Game information

**First quarter**

- CAR – Chuba Hubbard 4-yard pass from Bryce Young (Ryan Fitzgerald kick), 11:33. Panthers 7–0. **Drive: 6 plays, 42 yards, 2:23.**
- CHI – Caleb Williams 9-yard run (Cairo Santos kick), 5:52. Tied 7–7. **Drive: 9 plays, 73 yards, 5:41.**
- CHI – D'Andre Swift 1-yard run (Cairo Santos kick), 1:59. Bears 14–7. **Drive: 6 plays, 67 yards, 2:13.**

**Second quarter**

- CHI – Cole Kmet 22-yard pass from Caleb Williams (Cairo Santos kick), 13:57. Bears 21–7. **Drive: 2 plays, 41 yards, 0:51.**
- CAR – Jalen Coker 51-yard pass from Bryce Young (Ryan Fitzgerald kick), 12:40. Bears 21–14. **Drive: 3 plays, 73 yards, 1:17.**
- CAR – Bryce Young 7-yard run (Ryan Fitzgerald kick), 8:42. Tied 21–21. **Drive: 3 plays, 21 yards, 1:45.**
- CHI – Cairo Santos 40-yard field goal, 5:20. Bears 24–21. **Drive: 4 plays, 6 yards, 1:36.**
- CAR – Ryan Fitzgerald 44-yard field goal, 2:35. Tied 24–24. **Drive: 7 plays, 48 yards, 2:45.**
- CHI – Caleb Williams 29-yard run (Cairo Santos kick), 0:22. Bears 31–24. **Drive: 6 plays, 80 yards, 2:13.**

**Third quarter**

- CAR – Chuba Hubbard 2-yard run (Ryan Fitzgerald kick), 9:02. Tied 31–31. **Drive: 7 plays, 58 yards, 2:26.**
- CHI – D'Andre Swift 1-yard run (Cairo Santos kick), 3:05. Bears 38–31. **Drive: 13 plays, 65 yards, 5:57.**
- CHI – Kyle Monangai 61-yard run (Cairo Santos kick), 0:40. Bears 45–31. **Drive: 1 play, 61 yards, 0:10.**

**Fourth quarter**

- CHI – Jahdae Walker 1-yard pass from Caleb Williams (Cairo Santos kick), 6:27. Bears 52–31. **Drive: 12 plays, 61 yards, 8:23.**
- CAR – Jalen Coker 8-yard pass from Bryce Young (kick blocked), 4:00. Bears 52–37. **Drive: 10 plays, 76 yards, 2:27.**
- CHI – D'Andre Swift 28-yard run (Cairo Santos kick), 3:40. Bears 59–37. **Drive: 4 plays, 49 yards, 0:20.**

**Top passers**

- CHI – Caleb Williams – 21/29, 269 yards, 2 TD
- CAR – Bryce Young – 23/37, 361 yards, 3 TD, INT

**Top rushers**

- CHI – D'Andre Swift – 18 rushes, 124 yards, 3 TD
- CAR – Chuba Hubbard – 10 rushes, 49 yards, TD

**Top receivers**

- CHI – Kalif Raymond – 8 receptions, 84 yards
- CAR – Jalen Coker – 8 receptions, 138 yards, 2 TD

In the Panthers' home opener, Chicago ended up being too much for Carolina in the second half. The Bears defeated the Panthers 59–37 and they started the season 0–1 for the fifth consecutive season. The 59 points for the Bears also set a new franchise record for the most points ever allowed in a single game.

==== Week 2: at Atlanta Falcons ====
Week 2: Carolina Panthers at Atlanta Falcons – Game summary

Quarter	1	2	3	4	Total
**Panthers**	10	10	14	0	**34**
Falcons	0	3	0	0	**3**

at Mercedes-Benz Stadium, Atlanta, Georgia

- Date: September 20
- Game time: 1:00 p.m. EDT
- Game weather: None (retractable roof closed)
- Game attendance: 71,143
- Referee: Alex Moore
- TV announcers (Fox): Tim Brando, Matt Millen and Sarah Kustok
- Recap, Game Book

Game information

**First quarter**

- CAR – Chuba Hubbard 3-yard pass from Bryce Young (Ryan Fitzgerald kick), 10:48. Panthers 7–0. **Drive: 8 plays, 35 yards, 3:42.**
- CAR – Ryan Fitzgerald 37-yard field goal, 4:29. Panthers 10–0. **Drive: 7 plays, 10 yards, 2:46.**

**Second quarter**

- CAR – Ryan Fitzgerald 25-yard field goal, 5:54. Panthers 13–0. **Drive: 9 plays, 73 yards, 3:36.**
- ATL – Nick Folk 41-yard field goal, 1:07. Panthers 13–3. **Drive: 13 plays, 65 yards, 4:47.**
- CAR – Darren Waller 7-yard pass from Bryce Young (Ryan Fitzgerald kick), 0:20. Panthers 20–3. **Drive: 6 plays, 73 yards, 0:47.**

**Third quarter**

- CAR – Darren Waller 12-yard pass from Bryce Young (Ryan Fitzgerald kick), 9:38. Panthers 27–3. **Drive: 10 plays, 73 yards, 5:22.**
- CAR – Devin Lloyd 16-yard interception return (Ryan Fitzgerald kick), 2:58. Panthers 34–3.

**Fourth quarter**

- No scoring plays

**Top passers**

- CAR – Bryce Young – 23/36, 287 yards, 3 TD
- ATL – Cooper Rush – 10/17, 86 yards, 2 INT

**Top rushers**

- CAR – Chuba Hubbard – 12 rushes, 53 yards
- ATL – Bijan Robinson – 16 rushes, 72 yards

**Top receivers**

- CAR – Tetairoa McMillan – 5 receptions, 101 yards
- ATL – Drake London – 4 receptions, 51 yards

The game started off with Atlanta fumbling the ball. Chuba Hubbard scored a touchdown for Carolina, followed by a Ryan Fitzgerald field goal. In Atlanta's next possession, Devin Lloyd tipped Cooper Rush's pass intended for Brian Robinson Jr., and it was intercepted by Bobby Okereke. On the Panthers' next possession, Fitzgerald converted a field goal, to extend the lead to 10. Late in the third, Bryce Young threw a touchdown pass to Darren Waller. Rush threw a second interception, caught by Lloyd, who scored a pick-six. The Panthers won 34–3 and they improved to 1–1. This marked their fourth consecutive win over the Falcons.

==== Week 3: at Cleveland Browns ====
Week 3: Carolina Panthers at Cleveland Browns – Game summary

Quarter	1	2	3	4	Total
Panthers	0	3	6	9	**18**
**Browns**	0	10	0	11	**21**

at Huntington Bank Field, Cleveland, Ohio

- Date: September 27
- Game time: 1:00 p.m. EDT
- Game weather: Sunny, 68 °F (20 °C)
- Game attendance: 65,023
- Referee: Land Clark
- TV announcers (Fox): Chris Myers, Mark Schlereth and Jen Hale
- Recap, Game Book

Game information

**First quarter**

- No scoring plays

**Second quarter**

- CLE – Andre Szmyt 48-yard field goal, 5:43. Browns 3–0. **Drive: 7 plays, 18 yards, 2:50.**
- CLE – Harold Fannin Jr. 2-yard pass from Deshaun Watson (Andre Szmyt kick), 1:37. Browns 10–0. **Drive: 7 plays, 40 yards, 1:59.**
- CAR – Ryan Fitzgerald 35-yard field goal, 0:27. Browns 10–3. **Drive: 9 plays, 56 yards, 1:10.**

**Third quarter**

- CAR – Ryan Fitzgerald 41-yard field goal, 13:22. Browns 10–6. **Drive: 4 plays, 8 yards, 1:27.**
- CAR – Ryan Fitzgerald 53-yard field goal, 3:17. Browns 10–9. **Drive: 8 plays, 31 yards, 2:43.**

**Fourth quarter**

- CAR – Ryan Fitzgerald 37-yard field goal, 11:41. Panthers 12–10. **Drive: 12 plays, 68 yards, 5:29.**
- CLE – Andre Szmyt 45-yard field goal, 7:30. Browns 13–12. **Drive: 7 plays, 44 yards, 4:11.**
- CAR – John Metchie III 8-yard pass from Bryce Young (pass failed), 4:25. Panthers 18–13. **Drive: 6 plays, 72 yards, 3:05.**
- CLE – Harold Fannin Jr. 14-yard pass from Deshaun Watson (Deshaun Watson–Denzel Boston pass), 1:48. Browns 21–18. **Drive: 8 plays, 65 yards, 2:37.**

**Top passers**

- CAR – Bryce Young – 26/48, 291 yards, TD, INT
- CLE – Deshaun Watson – 16/30, 144 yards, 2 TD

**Top rushers**

- CAR – Chuba Hubbard – 19 rushes, 82 yards
- CLE – Quinshon Judkins – 18 rushes, 70 yards

**Top receivers**

- CAR – Brycen Tremayne – 4 receptions, 83 yards
- CLE – Harold Fannin Jr. – 7 receptions, 51 yards, 2 TD

In the first quarter, neither team managed to score. The Browns took a 10–0 lead via a Andre Szmyt field goal and a Deshaun Watson touchdown to Harold Fannin Jr., and the Panthers cut the deficit to seven after Ryan Fitzgerald converted a field goal. Fitzgerald then converted two more field goals, making it a one point game. With 4:25 remaining, Carolina reduced the deficit to five after Bryce Young threw a touchdown pass to John Metchie III, though the two-point conversion was no good. Ultimately, the Panthers were defeated 18–21, and they fell to 1–2. This marked their third straight loss to the Browns.

==== Week 4: vs. Detroit Lions ====
Week 4: Detroit Lions at Carolina Panthers – Game summary

Quarter	1	2	3	4	Total
Lions	3	13	3	7	**26**
**Panthers**	7	9	13	3	**32**

at Bank of America Stadium, Charlotte, North Carolina

- Date: October 4
- Game time: 8:20 p.m. EDT
- Game weather: Cloudy, 66 °F (19 °C)
- Game attendance: 73,436
- Referee: Clay Martin
- TV announcers (NBC): Mike Tirico, Cris Collinsworth and Melissa Stark
- Recap, Game Book

Game information

**First quarter**

- DET – Jake Bates 54-yard field goal, 12:05. Lions 3–0. **Drive: 7 plays, 29 yards, 2:55.**
- CAR – Chuba Hubbard 15-yard run (Ryan Fitzgerald kick), 1:50. Panthers 7–3. **Drive: 8 plays, 72 yards, 4:00.**

**Second quarter**

- DET – Jake Bates 43-yard field goal, 12:37. Panthers 7–6. **Drive: 10 plays, 48 yards, 4:13.**
- CAR – Tetairoa McMillan 32-yard pass from Bryce Young (kick failed, hit right upright), 8:08. Panthers 13–6. **Drive: 9 plays, 75 yards, 4:29.**
- DET – Jahmyr Gibbs 1-yard run (Jake Bates kick), 2:14. Tied 13–13. **Drive: 11 plays, 68 yards, 5:54.**
- CAR – Ryan Fitzgerald 47-yard field goal, 0:28. Panthers 16–13. **Drive: 9 plays, 41 yards, 1:46.**
- DET – Jake Bates 41-yard field goal, 0:00. Tied 16–16. **Drive: 4 plays, 49 yards, 0:28.**

**Third quarter**

- CAR – Tetairoa McMillan 10-yard pass from Bryce Young (kick failed, wide right), 9:33. Panthers 22–16. **Drive: 11 plays, 76 yards, 5:27.**
- DET – Jake Bates 26-yard field goal, 6:21. Panthers 22–19. **Drive: 7 plays, 57 yards, 3:12.**
- CAR – Chuba Hubbard 2-yard run (Ryan Fitzgerald kick), 2:47. Panthers 29–19. **Drive: 7 plays, 85 yards, 3:34.**

**Fourth quarter**

- CAR – Ryan Fitzgerald 33-yard field goal, 8:59. Panthers 32–19. **Drive: 13 plays, 72 yards, 5:44.**
- DET – Sam LaPorta 8-yard pass from Jared Goff (Jake Bates kick), 3:38. Lions 31–24. **Drive: 10 plays, 67 yards, 2:29.**

**Top passers**

- DET – Jared Goff – 32/52, 412 yards, TD
- CAR – Bryce Young – 29/41, 329 yards, 2 TD

**Top rushers**

- DET – Jahmyr Gibbs – 15 rushes, 46 yards, TD
- CAR – Chuba Hubbard – 20 rushes, 122 yards, 2 TD

**Top receivers**

- DET – Sam LaPorta – 8 receptions, 84 yards, TD
- CAR – Tetairoa McMillan – 14 receptions, 192 yards, 2 TD

This was the Panthers' first Sunday Night Football game at home since 2015, and their first appearance on SNF overall since 2016. In the first half, Carolina took 13–6 lead with a Chuba Hubbard rushing touchdown and a Bryce Young pass to Tetairoa McMillan. In response, Jahmyr Gibbs scored a touchdown for the Lions. Both teams exchanged field goals, resulting in a 16–16 tie at halftime. Another Hubbard touchdown run and a Fitzgerald field goal extended Carolina's lead to 10. Ultimately, the Panthers won 32–26 and improved to 2–2.

==== Week 6: at Philadelphia Eagles ====
Week 6: Carolina Panthers at Philadelphia Eagles – Game summary

Quarter	1	2	3	4	Total
**Panthers**	3	7	3	12	**25**
Eagles	0	7	0	7	**14**

at Lincoln Financial Field, Philadelphia, Pennsylvania

- Date: October 18
- Game time: 1:00 p.m. EDT
- Game weather: Sunny, 53 °F (12 °C)
- Game attendance: 69,879
- Referee: John Hussey
- TV announcers (CBS): Ian Eagle, Ross Tucker and Evan Washburn
- Recap, Game Book

Game information

**First quarter**

- CAR – Ryan Fitzgerald 47-yard field goal, 10:50. Panthers 3–0. **Drive: 6 plays, 32 yards, 2:38.**

**Second quarter**

- CAR – Tommy Tremble 12-yard pass from Bryce Young (Ryan Fitzergerald kick), 8:08. Panthers 10–0. **Drive: 5 plays, 35 yards, 1:24.**
- PHI – Dameon Pierce 2-yard run (Jake Elliott kick), 2:42. Panthers 10–7. **Drive: 10 plays, 78 yards, 5:26.**

**Third quarter**

- CAR – Ryan Fitzgerald 52-yard field goal, 11:32. Panthers 13–7. **Drive: 12 plays, 36 yards, 3:28.**

**Fourth quarter**

- CAR – Chuba Hubbard 1-yard run (pass failed), 13:34. Panthers 19–7. **Drive: 14 plays, 92 yards, 7:43.**
- PHI – DeVonta Smith 19-yard pass from Tanner McKee (Jake Elliott kick), 10:42. Panthers 19–14. **Drive: 10 plays, 69 yards, 2:52.**
- CAR – Tommy Tremble 19-yard pass from Bryce Young (kick failed), 6:33. Panthers 25–14. **Drive: 4 plays, 48 yards, 1:51.**

**Top passers**

- CAR – Bryce Young – 20/39, 281 yards, 2 TD
- PHI – Tanner McKee – 26/45, 215 yards, TD

**Top rushers**

- CAR – Chuba Hubbard – 28 rushes, 120 yards, TD
- PHI – Dameon Pierce – 12 rushes, 35 yards, TD

**Top receivers**

- CAR – Jalen Coker – 6 receptions, 97 yards
- PHI – DeVonta Smith – 7 receptions, 75 yards, TD

The Panthers started the game with a Ryan Fitzgerald field goal and extended their lead to 10 thanks to a Bryce Young pass to Tommy Tremble. In response, the Eagles cut the deficit to three via a Dameon Pierce rush. In the fourth quarter, Carolina scored two more touchdowns, a Chuba Hubbard rush and a Young pass to Tremble and the Panthers defeated the Eagles 25–14, improving to 3–2.

==== Week 7: vs. Tampa Bay Buccaneers ====
Week 7: Tampa Bay Buccaneers at Carolina Panthers – Game summary

Quarter	1	2	3	4	Total
**Buccaneers**	7	26	3	7	**43**
Panthers	0	6	0	7	**13**

at Bank of America Stadium, Charlotte, North Carolina

- Date: October 25
- Game time: 1:00 p.m. EDT
- Game weather: Sunny, 66 °F (19 °C)
- Game attendance: 73,195
- Referee: Carl Cheffers
- TV announcers (Fox): Kevin Kugler, Daryl Johnston and Allison Williams
- Recap, Game Book

Game information

**First quarter**

- TB – Bucky Irving 4-yard run (Chase McLaughlin kick), 7:22. Buccaneers 7–0. **Drive: 14 plays, 70 yards, 7:48.**

**Second quarter**

- TB – Chase McLaughlin 22-yard field goal, 14:12. Buccaneers 10–0. **Drive: 5 plays, 14 yards, 1:35.**
- TB – Calijah Kancey 32-yard fumble return (Chase McLaughlin kick), 11:05. Buccaneers 17–0. **Drive: 5 plays, 1 yard, 3:07.**
- CAR – Darren Waller 50-yard pass from Bryce Young (kick failed, returned for two-point conversion), 9:09. Buccaneers 19–6. **Drive: 5 plays, 72 yards, 1:56.**
- TB – Bucky Irving 1-yard run (Chase McLaughlin kick), 3:53. Buccaneers 26–6. **Drive: 8 plays, 59 yards, 5:16.**
- TB – Tez Johnson 14-yard pass from Baker Mayfield (Chase McLaughlin kick), 0:04. Buccaneers 33–6. **Drive: 8 plays, 32 yards, 2:26.**

**Third quarter**

- TB – Chase McLaughlin 44-yard field goal, 6:30. Buccaneers 36–6. **Drive: 4 plays, 6 yards, 2:29.**

**Fourth quarter**

- TB – Sean Tucker 46-yard run (Chase McLaughlin kick), 10:21. Buccaneers 43–6. **Drive: 9 plays, 94 yards, 6:29.**
- CAR – Anthony Tyus III 12-yard run (Ryan Fitzgerald kick), 5:28. Buccaneers 43–13. **Drive: 8 plays, 71 yards, 4:53.**

**Top passers**

- TB – Baker Mayfield – 7/11, 64 yards, TD
- CAR – Bryce Young – 14/27, 163 yards, TD, 2 INT

**Top rushers**

- TB – Bucky Irving – 24 rushes, 106 yards, 2 TD
- CAR – Chuba Hubbard – 7 rushes, 33 yards

**Top receivers**

- TB – Tez Johnson – 2 receptions, 33 yards, TD
- CAR – Darren Waller – 1 reception, 50 yards, TD

The Buccaneers were too much for the Panthers, winning 43–13; Carolina fell to 3–3.

==== Week 8: at Green Bay Packers ====
Week 8: Carolina Panthers at Green Bay Packers – Game summary

Quarter	1	2	3	4	Total
Panthers	3	7	3	6	**19**
**Packers**	6	14	7	0	**27**

at Lambeau Field, Green Bay, Wisconsin

- Date: October 29
- Game time: 8:15 p.m. EDT/7:15 p.m. CDT
- Game weather: Clear, 54 °F (12 °C)
- Game attendance: 76,957
- Referee: Scott Novak
- TV announcers (WSOC/Prime Video): Al Michaels, Kirk Herbstreit and Kaylee Hartung
- Recap, Game Book

Game information

**First quarter**

- CAR – Ryan Fitzgerald 39-yard field goal, 11:43. Panthers 3–0. **Drive: 6 plays, 8 yards, 3:12.**
- GB – Tucker Kraft 12-yard pass from Jordan Love (kick failed), 5:08. Packers 6–3. **Drive: 8 plays, 56 yards, 3:33.**

**Second quarter**

- CAR – Chuba Hubbard 1-yard rush (Ryan Fitzgerald kick), 14:57. Panthers 10–6. **Drive: 13 plays, 65 yards, 5:11.**
- GB – Josh Jacobs 1-yard rush (Trey Smack kick), 6:33. Packers 13–10. **Drive: 9 plays, 90 yards, 4:47.**
- GB – Matthew Golden 24-yard pass from Jordan Love (Trey Smack kick), 1:46. Packers 20–10. **Drive: 8 plays, 43 yards, 3:32.**

**Third quarter**

- GB – Josh Jacobs 4-yard pass from Jordan Love (Trey Smack kick), 7:30. Packers 27–10. **Drive: 8 plays, 50 yards, 4:48.**
- CAR – Ryan Fitzgerald 50-yard field goal, 4:07. Packers 27–13. **Drive: 8 plays, 37 yards, 3:23.**

**Fourth quarter**

- CAR – Jalen Coker 26-yard pass from Bryce Young (pass failed), 5:37. Packers 27–19. **Drive: 12 plays, 70 yards, 5:03.**

**Top passers**

- CAR – Bryce Young – 23/31, 209 yards, TD, INT
- GB – Jordan Love – 30/41, 288 yards, 3 TD, INT

**Top rushers**

- CAR – Chuba Hubbard – 22 rushes, 81 yards, TD
- GB – Josh Jacobs – 21 rushes, 39 yards, TD

**Top receivers**

- CAR – Tetairoa McMillan – 6 receptions, 58 yards
- GB – Christian Watson – 8 receptions, 113 yards

This was the Panthers' first Thursday Night Football game since Week 10 of 2023 versus the Bears. Already down 27–10 in the third quarter, the Panthers' comeback attempt was thwarted as they narrowly lost to the Packers 19–27, falling to 3–4.

The following day, defensive coordinator Ejiro Evero was fired.

==== Week 9: vs. Denver Broncos ====
Week 9: Denver Broncos at Carolina Panthers – Game summary

Quarter	1	2	3	4	Total
**Broncos**	10	3	0	13	**26**
Panthers	0	7	7	7	**21**

at Bank of America Stadium, Charlotte, North Carolina

- Date: November 8
- Game time: 1:00 p.m. EST
- Game weather: Sunny, 63 °F (17 °C)
- Game attendance: 73,075
- Referee: Alan Eck
- TV announcers (CBS): Ian Eagle, Ross Tucker and Evan Washburn
- Recap, Game Book

Game information

**First quarter**

- DET – Wil Lutz 26-yard field goal, 11:09. Broncos 3–0. **Drive: 9 plays, 47 yards, 3:51.**
- DET – Courtland Sutton 3-yard pass from Bo Nix (Wil Lutz kick), 1:23. Broncos 10–0. **Drive: 10 plays, 81 yards, 6:42.**

**Second quarter**

- CAR – Tommy Tremble 10-yard pass from Bryce Young (Ryan Fitzgerald kick), 1:27. Broncos 10–7. **Drive: 14 plays, 86 yards, 6:02.**
- DET – Wil Lutz 48-yard field goal, 0:04. Broncos 13–7. **Drive: 7 plays, 30 yards, 1:23.**

**Third quarter**

- CAR – Darren Waller 15-yard pass from Bryce Young (Ryan Fitzgerald kick), 11:30. Panthers 14–13. **Drive: 6 plays, 65 yards, 3:30.**

**Fourth quarter**

- DET – Jonah Coleman 9-yard run (pass failed), 10:17. Broncos 19–14. **Drive: 14 plays, 80 yards, 6:13.**
- DET – Pat Bryant 26-yard pass from Bo Nix (Wil Lutz kick), 5:41. Broncos 26–14. **Drive: 6 plays, 61 yards, 3:30.**
- CAR – Tetairoa McMillan 4-yard pass from Bryce Young (Ryan Fitzgerald kick), 3:05. Broncos 26–21. **Drive: 12 plays, 64 yards, 2:36.**

**Top passers**

- DEN – Bo Nix – 25/37, 237 yards, 2 TD, INT
- CAR – Bryce Young – 28/39, 276 yards, 3 TD, INT

**Top rushers**

- DEN – Jonah Coleman – 15 rushes, 57 yards, TD
- CAR – Chuba Hubbard – 16 rushes, 79 yards

**Top receivers**

- DEN – Pat Bryant – 4 receptions, 56 yards, TD
- CAR – Darren Waller – 8 receptions, 90 yards, TD

The Panthers fell short of defeating the Broncos. Denver won 26–21, and Carolina fell to 3–5.

==== Week 10: at New Orleans Saints ====
Week 10: Carolina Panthers at New Orleans Saints – Game summary

Quarter	1	2	3	4	Total
**Panthers**	0	7	3	10	**20**
Saints	0	0	7	10	**17**

at Caesars Superdome, New Orleans, Louisiana

- Date: November 15
- Game time: 1:00 p.m. EST/12:00 p.m. CST
- Game weather: None (indoor stadium)
- Game attendance: 70,019
- Referee: Duane Heydt
- TV announcers (Fox): Kevin Kugler, Daryl Johnston and Allison Williams
- Recap, Game Book

Game information

**First quarter**

- No scoring plays

**Second quarter**

- CAR – Chuba Hubbard 2-yard run (Ryan Fitzgerald kick), 6:43. Panthers 7–0. **Drive: 11 plays 56 yards, 4:46.**

**Third quarter**

- NO – Alvin Kamara 3-yard run (Charlie Smyth kick), 6:33. Tied 7–7. **Drive: 9 plays, 64 yards, 4:05.**
- CAR – Ryan Fitzgerald 55-yard field goal, 2:30. Panthers 10–7. **Drive: 9 plays, 36 yard, 4:03.**

**Fourth quarter**

- NO – Alvin Kamara 4-yard pass from Tyler Shough (Charlie Smyth kick), 3:49. Saints 14–10. **Drive: 9 plays, 70 yards, 5:41.**
- CAR – Chuba Hubbard 1-yard run (Ryan Fitzgerald kick), 1:49. Panthers 17–14. **Drive: 6 plays, 68 yards, 2:00.**
- NO – Charlie Smyth 55-yard field goal, 0:41. Tied 17–17. **Drive: 8 plays, 41 yards, 1:08.**
- CAR – Ryan Fitzgerald 54-yard field goal, 0:00. Panthers 20–17. **Drive: 3 plays, 30 yard, 0:41.**

**Top passers**

- CAR – Bryce Young – 17/30, 200 yards
- NO – Tyler Shough – 25/35, 187 yards, TD, INT

**Top rushers**

- CAR – Chuba Hubbard – 27 rushes, 92 yards, 2 TD
- NO – Tyler Shough – 6 rushes, 25 yards

**Top receivers**

- CAR – Chuba Hubbard – 5 receptions, 80 yards
- NO – Jordyn Tyson – 11 receptions, 80 yards

The Panthers started off the first half with a 7–0 lead over New Orleans. In the third, Alvin Kamara tied it. Ryan Fitzgerald increased Carolina's lead with a field goal. New Orleans took over the lead in the fourth with another Kamara touchdown. Chuba Hubbard scored a touchdown for the Panthers, giving them the lead back. New Orleans answered when Charlie Smyth kicked a 55-yard field goal, tying it once again. With seconds to go in the game, Fitzgerald kicked the game-winning field goal. Carolina defeated New Orleans 20–17 and improved to 4–5.

==== Week 11: vs. Baltimore Ravens ====
Week 11: Baltimore Ravens at Carolina Panthers – Game summary

Quarter	1	2	3	4	Total
Ravens	12	14	0	7	**33**
**Panthers**	7	15	10	3	**35**

at Bank of America Stadium, Charlotte, North Carolina

- Date: November 22
- Game time: 1:00 p.m. EST
- Game weather: Misting, 58 °F (14 °C)
- Game attendance: 72,778
- Referee: Shawn Hochuli
- TV announcers (Fox): Kenny Albert, Jonathan Vilma, and Megan Olivi
- Recap

Game information

**First quarter**

- BAL – Bryce Young sacked in the end zone by Mike Green for a safety, 12:22. Ravens 2–0.
- BAL – Rashod Bateman 52-yard pass from Jacoby Brissett (Riley Patterson kick), 11:21. Ravens 9–0. **Drive: 3 plays, 70 yards, 1:01.**
- BAL – Riley Patterson 28-yard field goal, 2:48. Ravens 12–0. **Drive: 15 plays, 69 yards, 6:36.**
- CAR – Mitchell Evans 23-yard pass from Bryce Young (Ryan Fitzgerald kick), 00:1. Ravens 12–7. **Drive: 5 plays, 79 yards, 2:47.**

**Second quarter**

- CAR – Chuba Hubbard 18-yard run (Ryan Fitzgerald kick), 10:01. Panthers 14–12. **Drive: 2 plays, 23 yards, 0:34.**
- BAL – Devontez Walker 86-yard kickoff return (Riley Patterson kick), 9:49. Ravens 19–14.
- CAR – Tetairoa McMillan 7-yard pass from Bryce Young (Chuba Hubbard run), 5:06. Panthers 22–19. **Drive: 9 plays, 69 yards, 4:43.**
- BAL – Justice Hill 19-yard run (Riley Patterson kick), 2:22. Ravens 26–22. **Drive: 5 plays, 71 yards, 2:44.**

**Third quarter**

- CAR – Chuba Hubbard 1-yard run (Ryan Fitzgerald kick), 11:01. Panthers 29–26. **Drive: 8 plays, 56 yards, 3:59.**
- CAR – Ryan Fitzpatrick 33-yard field goal, 0:31. Panthers 32–26. **Drive: 8 plays, 32 yards, 3:48.**

**Fourth quarter**

- BAL – Derrick Henry 15-yard run (Riley Patterson kick), 6:32. Ravens 33–32. **Drive: 10 plays, 80 yards, 5:44.**
- CAR – Ryan Fitzpatrick 37-yard field goal, 1:44. Panthers 35–33. **Drive: 12 plays, 55 yards, 4:48.**

**Top passers**

- BAL – Jacoby Brissett – 24/37, 276 yards, TD, INT
- CAR – Bryce Young – 22/30, 254 yards, 2 TD, INT

**Top rushers**

- BAL – Derrick Henry – 13 rushes, 94 yards, TD
- CAR – Chuba Hubbard – 27 rushes, 120 yards, 2 TD

**Top receivers**

- BAL – Zay Flowers – 8 receptions, 97 yards
- CAR – Tetairoa McMillan – 6 reception, 71 yards, TD

==== Week 12: at Tampa Bay Buccaneers ====
Week 12: Carolina Panthers at Tampa Bay Buccaneers – Game summary

Quarter	1	2	3	4	Total
Panthers	0	0	0	0	**0**
Buccaneers	0	0	0	0	**0**

at Raymond James Stadium, Tampa, Florida

- Date: November 30
- Game time: 8:15 p.m. EST
- TV announcers (ESPN): Joe Buck, Troy Aikman and Lisa Salters
- Preview

=== Standings ===
==== Division ====
NFC South
	W	L	T	PCT	DIV	CONF	PF	PA	STK
Carolina Panthers	5	5	0	.500	2–1	4–3	254	269	W2
Tampa Bay Buccaneers	3	7	0	.300	2–0	3–4	223	209	L2
Atlanta Falcons	3	7	0	.300	1–2	3–3	201	258	L3
New Orleans Saints	3	7	0	.300	0–2	1–5	215	257	L2

==== Conference ====
NFC
Seed	Team	Division	W	L	T	PCT	DIV	CONF	SOS	SOV	STK
**Division leaders**
1	San Francisco 49ers	West	8	1	0	.889	3–0	5–1	.428	.444	W2
2 (Note: Detroit wins tie break over Chicago based on division record.)	Detroit Lions	North	8	2	0	.800	2–0	5–1	.440	.375	W6
3	New York Giants	East	5	3	1	.611	2–1–1	3–3–1	.356	.308	L1
4	Carolina Panthers	South	5	5	0	.500	2–1	4–3	.510	.412	W2
**Wild cards**
5	Chicago Bears	North	8	2	0	.800	0–2	6–2	.434	.375	W5
6	Minnesota Vikings	North	7	2	0	.778	3–1	5–1	.516	.423	W1
7 (Note: Green Bay wins tie break over Seattle based on conference record. Division tie break was initially used to eliminate LA Rams (see below).)	Green Bay Packers	North	6	4	0	.600	1–3	4–4	.535	.459	L1
**In the hunt**
8 (Note: Seattle wins tie break over LA Rams based on division record.)	Seattle Seahawks	West	6	4	0	.600	2–1	2–3	.515	.393	W2
9	Los Angeles Rams	West	6	4	0	.600	1–2	4–2	.485	.345	W4
10	Dallas Cowboys	East	5	6	0	.455	2–1	2–5	.400	.290	W1
11	Washington Commanders	East	3	5	1	.389	2–2–1	3–4–1	.506	.500	W1
12 (Note: Tampa Bay wins tie break over Philadelphia based on conference record. Division tie break was initially to eliminate Atlanta and New Orleans (see below).) (Note: Tampa Bay wins tie break over Atlanta and New Orleans based on head-to-head record.)	Tampa Bay Buccaneers	South	3	7	0	.300	2–0	3–4	.616	.419	L2
13 (Note: Atlanta wins tie break over Philadephia based on conference record. Division tie break was initially to eliminate New Orleans (see below).) (Note: Atlanta wins tie break over New Orleans based on head-to-head victory.)	Atlanta Falcons	South	3	7	0	.300	1–2	3–3	.586	.586	L3
14 (Note: New Orleans wins tie break over Philadelphia based on conference record.)	New Orleans Saints	South	3	7	0	.300	0–2	1–5	.571	.517	L2
15	Philadelphia Eagles	East	3	7	0	.300	1–3	1–6	.521	.362	W1
16	Arizona Cardinals	West	3	8	0	.273	1–4	2–6	.621	.400	L3
