= Jordan Traylor =

American football coach (born 1993)

Minnesota Vikings
- Title: Assistant Offensive Coordinator/Assistant Quarterbacks Coach

Personal information
- Born: October 16, 1993 (age 33); Tyler, Texas, U.S.
- Listed height: 6 ft 1 in (1.85 m)
- Listed weight: 195 lb (88 kg)

Career information
- Position: Quarterback
- College: Mississippi College (2012–2013) Texas A&M (2014–2015)

Career history
- Texas (2016–2017) Offensive graduate assistant; Arkansas (2018) Offensive analyst; New Orleans Saints (2019–2020) Scouting assistant; New Orleans Saints (2021–2022) Defensive assistant; New Orleans Saints (2023–2024) Offensive assistant; Minnesota Vikings (2025–present) Assistant offensive coordinator/assistant quarterbacks

Jordan Traylor (born October 16, 1993) is an American football coach who is the assistant offensive coordinator/assistant quarterbacks coach for the Minnesota Vikings.

== College career ==
Jordan Traylor played quarterback at Mississippi College from 2012-13, before transferring to Texas A&M from 2014-15.

== Coaching career ==
=== Early coaching career ===
Traylor started his coaching career in 2016, serving as an offensive graduate assistant working with quarterbacks and receivers at Texas. In 2018, he served as an offensive analyst working with quarterbacks at Arkansas.

=== New Orleans Saints ===
Jordan Traylor joined the New Orleans Saints in 2019, under head coach Sean Payton. Traylor spent his first two seasons with the team working as a scouting assisting, before becoming a defensive assistant coach in 2021. Following the departure of Payton after the 2021 season, Traylor was retained by new head coach Dennis Allen. In 2023, he moved to the offensive side of the ball for two seasons.

=== Minnesota Vikings ===
Traylor was hired by the Minnesota Vikings as their assistant offensive coordinator/assistant quarterbacks coach on March 18, 2025. Traylor replaced Grant Udinski in the role, who was hired by the Jacksonville Jaguars as their offensive coordinator.
