= Keith Carter (American football) =

American football player and coach (born 1982)

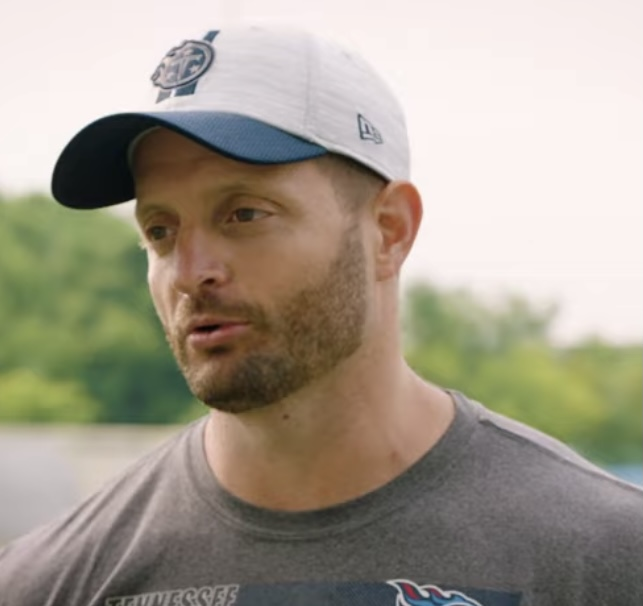
- Carter with the Tennessee Titans in 2021

Minnesota Vikings
- Title: Offensive line coach

Personal information
- Born: July 2, 1982 (age 44); Phoenixville, Pennsylvania, U.S.
- Listed height: 6 ft 4 in (1.93 m)
- Listed weight: 246 lb (112 kg)

Career information
- Position: Tight end
- High school: Downingtown (Downingtown, Pennsylvania)
- College: UCLA

Career history
- UCLA (2005) Graduate assistant; Wagner (2006) Tight ends coach; Redlands (2007–2008) Offensive line coach; San Diego (2009) Tight ends coach; San Diego (2010–2011) Offensive line coach; Seattle Seahawks (2012–2013) Offensive quality control coach; San Jose State (2014) Offensive line coach; Atlanta Falcons (2015–2016) Assistant offensive line coach; Atlanta Falcons (2017) Running backs coach; Tennessee Titans (2018–2022) Offensive line coach; New York Jets (2023–2024) Offensive line coach & run game coordinator; Minnesota Vikings (2025) Assistant offensive line coach; Minnesota Vikings (2026–present) Offensive line coach

Awards and highlights
- Super Bowl champion (XLVIII)

Keith Richard Carter (born July 2, 1982) is an American football coach and former tight end currently serving as the offensive line coach for the Minnesota Vikings of the National Football League (NFL).

== Playing career ==
At Downingtown High School, Carter was a three-year starter as a tight end and defensive end. He was recruited to play tight end by Gary Bernardi at UCLA. After redshirting his first year, Carter was awarded the Charles Pike Memorial Award for his help with the scout team. In 2002, Carter played in nine games, starting three of them. He also took snaps that season as a blocking running back. In April 2003, Carter plowed into the back of a car on his motorcycle, ending his playing career.

== Coaching career ==
=== Early coaching career ===
Carter began coaching at UCLA while he was still a student there in 2005. In 2006, Carter coached the tight ends for Wagner College. He then went to the University of Redlands where he coached the offensive line in 2007 and 2008. For the next three seasons, Carter coached at the University of San Diego working with the tight ends in 2009 and the offensive line in 2010 and 2011.

=== Seattle Seahawks ===
Carter made the jump to the NFL in 2012 where he coached with the Seahawks during the 2012 and 2013 seasons including Seattle's Super Bowl XLVIII Championship.

=== Atlanta Falcons ===
After spending the 2014 season back at the collegiate level, serving as the Spartans' run game coordinator and offensive line coach, Carter returned to the NFL to coach with the Falcons. He spent 2015 and 2016 as Atlanta's assistant offensive line coach and 2017 as the team's running backs coach.

=== Tennessee Titans ===
In 2018, Carter became the offensive line coach for the Tennessee Titans.

On January 9, 2023, the Titans head coach Mike Vrabel announced that Carter had been fired.

=== New York Jets ===
On January 24, 2023, the New York Jets announced that Carter was hired as the team’s offensive line coach and run game coordinator.

On January 29, 2025, Carter and the Jets parted ways.

=== Minnesota Vikings ===
On February 25, 2025, the Minnesota Vikings hired Carter to serve as the team's assistant offensive line coach. On February 24, 2026, Carter was promoted to offensive line coach following the departure of Chris Kuper.

== Personal life ==
Carter and his wife, Kristin, have two daughters Kayla and Kamryn. He is the grandson of Pro Football Hall of Fame defensive end Gino Marchetti, who played with the Baltimore Colts.
