= 1989 Green Bay Packers season =

NFL team season

- General manager: Tom Braatz
- President: Bob Harlan
- Head coach: Lindy Infante
- Home stadium: Lambeau Field; Milwaukee County Stadium

Results
- Record: 10–6
- Division place: 2nd NFC Central
- Playoffs: Did not qualify
- Pro Bowlers: QB Don Majkowski; WR Sterling Sharpe; FB Brent Fullwood; LB Tim Harris

The 1989 Green Bay Packers season was their 71st overall and their 69th in the National Football League. The Packers finished with a 10–6 record, their best since 1972, but failed to make the playoffs. The team was often referred to as "The Cardiac Pack" due to several close-game wins. The 1989 Packers hold the NFL record for most one-point victories in a season with four. The team was coached by Lindy Infante and led by quarterback Don Majkowski, who attained his nickname "The Majik Man."

== Offseason ==
=== Draft ===
The Green Bay Packers selected Tony Mandarich with their first pick of the 1989 NFL draft, passing on prospects such as Barry Sanders, Derrick Thomas, and Deion Sanders. Mandarich was a first-team All-American, an Outland Award finalist and a two-time Big Ten Lineman of the Year. Mandarich would later hold out most of the preseason, playing most of the regular season on special teams. Four years after signing Mandarich, the Packers cut him. ESPN rated Mandarich as the third biggest sports flop in the past 25 years.

1989 Green Bay Packers draft
Round	Pick	Player	Position	College	Notes
1	2	Tony Mandarich	Offensive tackle	Michigan State	
3	58	Matt Brock	Defensive end	Oregon	
3	74	Anthony Dilweg	Quarterback	Duke	
4	87	Jeff Graham	Quarterback	Long Beach State	
5	124	Jeff Query	Wide receiver	Millikin	
5	127	Vince Workman	Running back	Ohio State	
6	142	Chris Jacke *	Kicker	UTEP	
7	169	Mark Hall	Defensive end	Southwestern Louisiana	
8	198	Thomas King	Defensive back	Southwestern Louisiana	
8	206	Brian Shulman	Punter	Auburn	
9	225	Scott Kirby	Offensive tackle	Arizona State	
10	254	Ben Jessie	Cornerback	Southwest Texas State	
11	281	Cedric Stallworth	Cornerback	Georgia Tech	
12	310	Stan Shiver	Safety	Florida State	
Made roster * Made at least one Pro Bowl during career

=== Undrafted free agents ===
1989 undrafted free agents of note
Player	Position	College
Matt Klassa	Tackle	Eastern Michigan
Tony Thompson	Wide receiver	Texas A&M

== Personnel ==
=== Staff ===
1989 Green Bay Packers staff
Front office: President and chief executive officer – Bob Harlan; Executive vice-president of football operations – Tom Braatz; Head coaches: Head coach – Lindy Infante; Offensive coaches: Offensive backs – Willie Peete; Wide receivers – Wayne "Buddy" Geis; Tight ends – Virgil Knight; Offensive line – Charlie Davis; Offensive assistant – Joe Clark	Defensive coaches: Defensive coordinator – Hank Bullough; Defensive line – Greg Blache; Outside linebackers – Dick Moseley; Defensive backs – Dick Jauron; Special teams coaches: Special teams – Howard Tippett; Strength and conditioning: Strength and conditioning – Virgil Knight

=== Roster ===
1989 Green Bay Packers roster
Quarterbacks (QB): 8 Anthony Dilweg; 10 Blair Kiel; 7 Don Majkowski; Running backs (RB): 27 Herman Fontenot; 21 Brent Fullwood; 35 Michael Haddix; 33 Keith Woodside; 46 Vince Workman; Wide receivers (WR): 83 Carl Bland; 81 Perry Kemp; 88 Aubrey Matthews; 85 Jeff Query; 84 Sterling Sharpe; Tight ends (TE): 80 Clint Didier; 89 John Spagnola; 86 Ed West	Offensive linemen (OL): 67 Billy Ard G; 76 Mike Ariey T; 51 Blair Bush C; 63 James Campen C; 65 Ron Hallstrom G; 77 Tony Mandarich T; 57 Rich Moran G; 75 Ken Ruettgers T; 73 Alan Veingrad T; Defensive linemen (DL): 61 Jerry Boyarsky NT; 93 Robert Brown DE; 72 Mark Hall DE; 79 Bob Nelson NT; 68 Blaise Winter DE	Linebackers (LB): 59 John Anderson OLB; 56 Burnell Dent ILB; 97 Tim Harris OLB; 50 Johnny Holland ILB; 91 Brian Noble ILB; 54 Scott Stephen OLB; 52 Mike Weddington OLB; Defensive backs (DB): 32 Dave Brown CB; 26 Chuck Cecil FS; 23 Tiger Greene SS; 24 Van Jakes CB; 22 Mark Lee CB; 37 Mark Murphy SS; 28 Ron Pitts CB; 29 Ken Stills FS; Special teams (ST): 17 Don Bracken P; 13 Chris Jacke K	Practice squad: 43 Rick Aeilts TE; 36 George Cooper FB; 20 Mike McGruder CB; 40 Cedric Gordon WR; 39 Stan Shiver S; Reserve: 44 Erik Affholter WR (NF-Inj.); 62 Matt Brock DE (IR); 60 Dave Croston T (IR); -- Keith Cupp T (DNR); 99 John Dorsey LB (IR); 96 Shawn Patterson DE (IR); 70 Keith Uecker T/G (IR); 47 active, 7 inactive, 5 practice squad Rookies in italics

== Regular season ==
Although the Packers failed to make the Playoffs, they recorded their best record since 1972. The Packers finished 10–6, placing them second in the NFC Central. The Minnesota Vikings also finished 10–6, but held the tiebreaker due to a better division record. The team finished with a 10–6 record for their first winning season since the strike shortened the 1982 season. It was also the first club to record 4 1-point victories in a season. The club was 6–2 at home and 4–4 on the road. The Packers offense had success due to a strong passing game, headed by quarterback Don Majkowski. Majkowski finished first in the NFL in passing yards and completions. He earned a bid to the NFL Pro Bowl. Wide receiver Sterling Sharpe finished the season first in receptions, and second in receiving yards and receiving touchdowns. Sharpe would also earn a bid to the Pro Bowl.

=== The Herschel Walker trade and the Packers ===
On October 8, 1989, the Packers hosted the Dallas Cowboys, featuring star running back Herschel Walker. Four days later, the Cowboys traded Walker to the Minnesota Vikings, the next team on the Packers' schedule. Walker's debut with the Vikings occurred three days after the trade, on October 15, 1989, against the Packers. The Packers faced Walker for a third time during the regular season, on November 26, 1989, when the Packers played the Vikings again. These regular season games between the Packers and Walker occurred in three different cities: Green Bay, Minneapolis, and Milwaukee.

=== The Instant Replay game ===
On November 5, 1989, the Packers beat the Bears 14–13, but not without controversy. Don Majkowski led the Packers to a comeback and a game-winning touchdown pass to Sterling Sharpe with less than a minute left to play. Initially the play was called a touchdown, but line judge Jim Quirk had called a penalty on Majkowski for being beyond the line of scrimmage when he threw the pass. With a nervous and tense crowd at Lambeau Field, the call went up to the instant replay official, Bill Parkinson. Several minutes later the call came down and the touchdown was awarded as recorded by instant replay. The Lambeau faithful and Packer players erupted with joy because it marked the first time since 1984 that the Packers had beaten their long-time rivals. The Packers would later beat the Bears again in the season. The game was broadcast on CBS with Dick Stockton and Dan Fouts on the call.

=== The last team to beat San Francisco ===
On November 19, 1989, the Packers traveled to Candlestick Park and beat Joe Montana and the San Francisco 49ers. It would be one of only two losses for the 49ers, and the last before the 49ers finished out the season 8–0, including a 55–10 victory over the Denver Broncos in Super Bowl XXIV. In that game, the Packers matched their win total from the previous season (4–12). Although regarded at the time as a fluke, Green Bay would proceed to win 13 of the next 15 contests with San Francisco over the next 21 seasons.

=== Schedule ===
Week	Date	Opponent	Result	Record	Venue	Attendance
1	September 10	**Tampa Bay Buccaneers**	**L** 21–23	0–1	Lambeau Field	55,650
2	September 17	New Orleans Saints	**W** 35–34	1–1	Lambeau Field	55,809
3	September 24	at Los Angeles Rams	**L** 38–41	1–2	Anaheim Stadium	57,701
4	October 1	Atlanta Falcons	**W** 23–21	2–2	Milwaukee County Stadium	54,647
5	October 8	Dallas Cowboys	**W** 31–13	3–2	Lambeau Field	56,656
6	October 15	at **Minnesota Vikings**	**L** 14–26	3–3	Metrodome	62,075
7	October 22	at Miami Dolphins	**L** 20–23	3–4	Joe Robbie Stadium	56,624
8	October 29	**Detroit Lions**	**W** 23–20 (OT)	4–4	Milwaukee County Stadium	53,731
9	November 5	**Chicago Bears**	**W** 14–13	5–4	Lambeau Field	56,556
10	November 12	at **Detroit Lions**	**L** 22–31	5–5	Pontiac Silverdome	44,324
11	November 19	at San Francisco 49ers	**W** 21–17	6–5	Candlestick Park	62,219
12	November 26	**Minnesota Vikings**	**W** 20–19	7–5	Milwaukee County Stadium	55,592
13	December 3	at **Tampa Bay Buccaneers**	**W** 17–16	8–5	Tampa Stadium	58,120
14	December 10	Kansas City Chiefs	**L** 3–21	8–6	Lambeau Field	56,694
15	December 17	at **Chicago Bears**	**W** 40–28	9–6	Soldier Field	44,781
16	December 24	at Dallas Cowboys	**W** 20–10	10–6	Texas Stadium	41,265

Note: Intra-division opponents are in bold text.

=== Season summary ===
==== Week 1: vs. Tampa Bay Buccaneers ====
Week 1: Tampa Bay Buccaneers at Green Bay Packers

Quarter	1	2	3	4	Total
**Buccaneers**	0	20	3	0	**23**
Packers	7	0	7	7	**21**

at Lambeau Field, Green Bay, Wisconsin

- Date: September 10, 1989
- Game time: 12:00 p.m. CST
- Game weather: Overcast, 60 °F (16 °C)
- Referee: Pat Haggerty
- TV announcers (CBS): Jim Nantz and Pat Haden

Game information

**First quarter**

**Second quarter**

**Third quarter**

**Fourth quarter**

Top passers

- TAM – Vinny Testaverde – 22/27, 205 yards, TD
- GB – Don Majkowski – 21/32, 313 yards, TD, INT

Top rushers

- TAM – William Howard – 17 rushes, 67 yards
- GB – Brent Fullwood – 8 rushes, 54 yards

Top receivers

- TAM – Mark Carrier – 6 receptions, 73 yards
- GB – Keith Woodside – 6 receptions, 49 yards

==== Week 4: vs. Atlanta Falcons ====
Week 4: Atlanta Falcons at Green Bay Packers

Quarter	1	2	3	4	Total
Falcons	0	20	3	0	**23**
**Packers**	7	0	7	7	**21**

at Milwaukee County Stadium, Milwaukee, Wisconsin

- Date: October 1, 1989
- Game time: 12:00 p.m. CST
- Game weather: Overcast, 76 °F (24 °C)
- Referee: Dick Hantak
- TV announcers (CBS): Tim Ryan and Randy Cross

Game information

**First quarter**

**Second quarter**

**Third quarter**

**Fourth quarter**

Top passers

- ATL – Hugh Millen – 20/29, 294 yards, TD, INT
- GB – Don Majkowski – 19/35, 295 yards, TD, 2 INT

Top rushers

- ATL – John Settle – 15 rushes, 49 yards, TD
- GB – Brent Fullwood – 19 rushes, 84 yards

Top receivers

- ATL – Shawn Collins – 5 receptions, 126 yards
- GB – Perry Kemp – 5 receptions, 80 yards

==== Week 5: vs. Dallas Cowboys ====
Week 5: Dallas Cowboys at Green Bay Packers

Quarter	1	2	3	4	Total
Cowboys	6	7	0	0	**13**
**Packers**	10	7	7	7	**31**

at Lambeau Field, Green Bay, Wisconsin

- Date: October 8, 1989
- Game time: 12:00 p.m. CST
- Game weather: Overcast, 39 °F (4 °C)
- Referee: Jerry Markbreit
- TV announcers (CBS): Tim Brant and Dan Jiggetts

Game information

**First quarter**

**Second quarter**

**Third quarter**

**Fourth quarter**

Top passers

- DAL – Steve Walsh – 18/29, 193 yards, TD, INT
- GB – Don Majkowski – 21/32, 313 yards, 4 TD

Top rushers

- DAL – Herschel Walker – 12 rushes, 44 yards
- GB – Brent Fullwood – 28 rushes, 119 yards

Top receivers

- DAL – Michael Irvin – 6 receptions, 72 yards, TD
- GB – Sterling Sharpe – 6 receptions, 132 yards, TD

==== Week 6 at Minnesota Vikings ====
Week 6: Green Bay Packers at Minnesota Vikings

Quarter	1	2	3	4	Total
Packers	7	0	0	7	**14**
**Vikings**	0	17	9	0	**26**

at Hubert H. Humphrey Metrodome, Minneapolis, Minnesota

- Date: October 15, 1989
- Game time: 12:00 p.m. CST
- Game weather: None (indoor stadium)
- TV announcers (CBS): Verne Lundquist and Terry Bradshaw

Game information

**First quarter**

**Second quarter**

**Third quarter**

**Fourth quarter**

Top passers

- GB – Don Majkowski – 9/24, 198 yards, TD, 2 INT
- MIN – Tommy Kramer – 14/24, 172 yards, 2 TD, INT

Top rushers

- GB – Keith Woodside – 3 rushes, 36 yards
- MIN – Herschel Walker – 18 rushes, 148 yards

Top receivers

- GB – Sterling Sharpe – 2 receptions, 82 yards
- MIN – Hassan Jones – 4 receptions, 68 yards

==== Week 8: vs Detroit Lions ====
Week 8: Detroit Lions at Green Bay Packers – Game summary

Quarter	1	2	3	4	OT	Total
Lions	7	3	0	10	0	**20**
**Packers**	3	7	10	0	3	**23**

at Milwaukee County Stadium, Milwaukee

- Date: October 29, 1989
- Game time: 12:00 p.m. CDT
- Game attendance: 53,731
- TV announcers (CBS): Tim Ryan and Randy Cross
- Box score

Game information

**First quarter**

- GB – Chris Jacke 49-yard field goal, 7:58. Green Bay 3–0 **Drive: 12 plays, 43 yards, 5:18.**
- DET – Richard Johnson 6-yard pass from Rodney Peete, 0:50. Detroit 7–3 **Drive: 11 plays, 80 yards, 7:08.**

**Second quarter**

- DET – Eddie Murray 42-yard field goal, 10:39. Detroit 10–3 **Drive: 11 plays, 48 yards, 4:12.**
- GB – Jeff Query 4-yard pass from Don Majkowski (Chris Jacke kick good), 0:15. Tied 10–10 **Drive: 7 plays, 80 yards, 1:42.**

**Third quarter**

- GB – Chris Jacke 21-yard field goal, 10:46. Green Bay 13–10 **Drive: 9 plays, 76 yards, 4:14.**
- GB – Sterling Sharpe 2-yard pass from Don Majkowski (Chris Jacke kick good), 4:08. Green Bay 20–10 **Drive: 12 plays, 67 yards, 5:24.**

**Fourth quarter**

- DET – Eddie Murray 46-yard field goal, 11:36. Green Bay 20–13 **Drive: 10 plays, 57 yards, 4:04.**
- DET – Rodney Peete 14-yard run (Eddie Murray kick good), 3:59. Tied 20–20 **Drive: 2 plays, 1 yard, 0:55.**

**Overtime**

- GB – Chris Jacke 38-yard field goal, 12:46. Green Bay 23–20 **Drive: 4 plays, 5 yards, 2:03.**

**Top passers**

- GB – Don Majkowski – 29/45, 367 yards, 2 TD, INT
- DET – Rodney Peete – 14/28, 201 yards, TD, INT

**Top receivers**

- GB – Sterling Sharpe – 7 receptions, 105 yards, TD
- DET – Richard Johnson – 5 receptions, 85 yards, TD

**Top rushers**

- GB – Brent Fullwood – 12 rushes, 35 yards
- DET – Barry Sanders – 30 rushes, 184 yards

==== Week 9 vs Chicago Bears ====
Week 9: Chicago Bears at Green Bay Packers

Quarter	1	2	3	4	Total
Bears	3	0	10	0	**13**
**Packers**	7	0	0	7	**14**

at Lambeau Field, Green Bay, Wisconsin

- Date: November 5, 1989
- Game time: 12:00 p.m. CST
- Game weather: Overcast, 47 °F (8 °C)
- Referee: Tom Dooley
- TV announcers (CBS): Dick Stockton and Dan Fouts

Game information

**First quarter**

**Second quarter**

**Third quarter**

**Fourth quarter**

Top passers

- CHI – Jim Harbaugh – 16/30, 203 yards
- GB – Don Majkowski – 23/40, 299 yards, 2 TDs, INT

Top rushers

- CHI – Neal Anderson – 15 rushes, 58 yards
- GB – Brent Fullwood – 10 rushes, 38 yards

Top receivers

- CHI – Brad Muster – 6 receptions, 68 yards
- GB – Brent Fullwood – 2 receptions, 76 yards

==== Week 11 at San Francisco 49ers ====
Week Eleven: Green Bay Packers at San Francisco 49ers – Game summary

Quarter	1	2	3	4	Total
**Packers**	7	7	0	7	**21**
49ers	7	7	0	3	**17**

at Candlestick Park, San Francisco, California

- Date: November 19
- Game time: 1:00 p.m. PST
- Game weather: 72 °F or 22.2 °C (Sunny); wind 4 miles per hour (6.4 km/h; 3.5 kn)
- Game attendance: 62,219
- Referee: Dick Hantak
- TV announcers (CBS): Dick Stockton (play-by-play), Dan Fouts (color commentator)
- Pro-Football-Reference.com

Game information

**First quarter**

- GB – Don Majkowski 2 yard rush – (Chris Jacke kick) **Packers 7–0**
- SF – Roger Craig 4 yard pass from Joe Montana – (Mike Cofer kick) **Tied 7–7**

**Second quarter**

- GB – Sterling Sharpe 4 yard pass from Don Majkowski – (Chris Jacke kick) **Packers 14–7**
- SF – Jerry Rice 9 yard pass from Joe Montana – (Mike Cofer kick) **Tied 14–14**

**Third quarter**

- No scoring plays

**Fourth quarter**

- GB – Don Majkowski 8 yard rush – (Chris Jacke kick) **Packers 21–14**
- SF – Mike Cofer 44 yard field goal – **Packers 21–17**

**Top passers**

- GB – Don Majkowski, 18/30, 153 Yds, 1 TD
- SF – Joe Montana, 30/42, 325 Yds, 2 TDs, 1 Int

**Top rushers**

- GB – Brent Fullwood, 16 Car, 76 Yds
- SF – Roger Craig, 8 Car, 41 Yds

**Top receivers**

- GB – Sterling Sharpe, 6 Rec, 59 Yds, 1 TD
- SF – Jerry Rice, 9 Rec, 106 Yds, 1 TD

**Top tacklers**

- GB -
- SF -

**Turnovers**

- GB – 1
- SF – 4

==== Week 14: vs. Kansas City Chiefs ====
Kansas City Chiefs at Green Bay Packers

Quarter	1	2	3	4	Total
**Chiefs**	0	21	0	0	**21**
Packers	0	3	0	0	**3**

at Lambeau Field, Green Bay, Wisconsin

- Date: December 10, 1989
- Game time: 12:00 p.m. CST
- Game weather: Overcast, 23 °F (−5 °C)
- Referee: Jim Tunney
- TV announcers (NBC): Jim Donovan and Jimmy Cefalo

Game information

**First quarter**

**Second quarter**

**Third quarter**

**Fourth quarter**

Top passers

- KC – Steve DeBerg – 15/19, 203 yards, 2 TD
- GB – Don Majkowski – 14/34, 123 yards, INT

Top rushers

- KC – Christian Okoye – 38 rushes, 313 yards, TD
- GB – Brent Fullwood – 10 rushes, 39 yards

Top receivers

- KC – Jonathan Hayes – 4 receptions, 53 yards, TD
- GB – Perry Kemp – 3 receptions, 29 yards

==== Week 15 at Chicago Bears ====
Green Bay Packers at Chicago Bears

Quarter	1	2	3	4	Total
**Packers**	14	10	6	10	**40**
Bears	7	7	14	0	**28**

at Soldier Field, Chicago, Illinois

- Date: December 17, 1989
- Game time: 12:00 p.m. CST
- Game weather: Overcast, 8 °F (−13 °C)
- Referee: Dick Jorgensen
- TV announcers (CBS): Pat Summerall and John Madden

Game information

**First quarter**

**Second quarter**

**Third quarter**

**Fourth quarter**

Top passers

Top rushers

Top receivers

=== Standings ===
NFC Central
	W	L	T	PCT	DIV	CONF	PF	PA	STK
Minnesota Vikings^{(3)}	10	6	0	.625	6–2	8–4	362	356	W1
Green Bay Packers	10	6	0	.625	5–3	10–4	362	275	W2
Detroit Lions	7	9	0	.438	4–4	6–6	312	364	W5
Chicago Bears	6	10	0	.375	2–6	4–8	358	377	L6
Tampa Bay Buccaneers	5	11	0	.313	3–5	5–7	320	419	L4

== Season statistical leaders ==
- Passing yards: Don Majkowski 4,318 yards
- Passing touchdowns: Don Majkowski 27 TDs
- Rushing yards: Brent Fullwood, 821 yards
- Rushing touchdowns: Brent Fullwood, 5 TDs
- Receiving yards: Sterling Sharpe, 1,423 yards
- Receiving touchdowns: Sterling Sharpe, 12 TDs
- Points: Chris Jacke, 108 points
- Kickoff return yards: Vince Workman, 547 yards
- Punt return yards: Jeff Query, 247 yards
- Sacks: Tim Harris, 19.5 sacks
- Interceptions: Dave Brown, 6 interceptions

== Awards and records ==
- Sterling Sharpe, NFL leader in receptions (90)
- Sterling Sharpe, second in NFL in receiving yards (1,423)

=== Milestones ===
- Don Majkowski, first 4,000 yard passing season
- Sterling Sharpe, first 1,000 yard receiving season

=== Hall of Fame Inductions ===
- In 1989 Packer great Willie Wood was inducted to the Pro Football Hall of Fame
- Zeke Bratkowski and Ron Kostelnik were inducted to the Green Bay Packers Hall of Fame
