= 1990 Green Bay Packers season =

NFL team season

- General manager: Tom Braatz
- President: Bob Harlan
- Head coach: Lindy Infante
- Home stadium: Lambeau Field; Milwaukee County Stadium

Results
- Record: 6–10
- Division place: 4th NFC Central
- Playoffs: Did not qualify
- Pro Bowlers: WR Sterling Sharpe

The 1990 Green Bay Packers season was their 72nd season overall and their 70th in the National Football League. The team finished with a 6–10 record under third-year coach Lindy Infante, earning them a fourth-place finish in the NFC Central division.

== Offseason ==
=== NFL draft ===
1990 Green Bay Packers draft
Round	Pick	Player	Position	College	Notes
1	18	Tony Bennett	Linebacker	Mississippi	
1	19	Darrell Thompson	Running back	Minnesota	
2	48	LeRoy Butler * ^{†}	Safety	Florida State	
3	75	Bobby Houston	Linebacker	North Carolina State	
4	102	Jackie Harris	Tight end	Northeastern Louisiana	
5	132	Charles Wilson	Wide receiver	Memphis State	
6	159	Bryce Paup *	Linebacker	Northern Iowa	
7	186	Lester Archambeau	Defensive end	Stanford	
8	215	Roger Brown	Cornerback	Virginia Tech	
9	242	Kirk Baumgartner	Quarterback	Wisconsin–Stevens Point	
10	269	Jerome Martin	Cornerback	Western Kentucky	
11	299	Harry Jackson	Running back	St. Cloud State	
12	325	Kirk Maggio	Punter	UCLA	
Made roster † Pro Football Hall of Fame * Made at least one Pro Bowl during career

=== Undrafted free agents ===
1990 undrafted free agents of note
Player	Position	College
Doman Stell	Running back	Oklahoma

== Personnel ==
=== Staff ===
1990 Green Bay Packers staff
Front office: President/Chief Executive Officer – Bob Harlan; Executive Vice President of Football Operations – Tom Braatz; Head coaches: Head coach – Lindy Infante; Offensive coaches: Offensive backs – Willie Peete; Wide receivers – Wayne "Buddy" Geis; Tight ends – Virgil Knight; Offensive line – Charlie Davis; Assistant offensive line – Joe Clark	Defensive coaches: Defensive coordinator – Hank Bullough; Defensive line – Greg Blache; Outside linebackers – Dick Moseley; Defensive backs – Dick Jauron; Special teams coaches: Special teams – Howard Tippett; Strength and conditioning: Strength and conditioning – Virgil Knight

=== Roster ===
1990 Green Bay Packers roster
Quarterbacks (QB): 8 Anthony Dilweg; 10 Blair Kiel; 4 Mike Norseth; Running backs (RB): 27 Herman Fontenot; 35 Michael Haddix FB; 39 Darrell Thompson; 33 Keith Woodside; 46 Vince Workman; Wide receivers (WR): 83 Carl Bland; 81 Perry Kemp; 85 Jeff Query; 84 Sterling Sharpe; 87 Clarence Weathers; 88 Charles Wilson; Tight ends (TE): 80 Jackie Harris; 48 Craig Hudson; 86 Ed West	Offensive linemen (OL): 67 Billy Ard G; 51 Blair Bush C; 63 James Campen C; 65 Ron Hallstrom G; 77 Tony Mandarich T; 57 Rich Moran G; 75 Ken Ruettgers T; 70 Keith Uecker G; 73 Alan Veingrad T; Defensive linemen (DL): 62 Matt Brock DE; 93 Robert Brown DE; 72 Mark Hall DE; 79 Bob Nelson NT; 96 Shawn Patterson DE	Linebackers (LB): 90 Tony Bennett OLB; 56 Burnell Dent ILB; 97 Tim Harris OLB; 50 Johnny Holland ILB; 95 Bryce Paup OLB; 54 Scott Stephen OLB; Defensive backs (DB): 36 LeRoy Butler CB; 23 Tiger Greene FS; 44 Jerry Holmes CB; 38 Rico Labbe SS; 22 Mark Lee CB; 37 Mark Murphy SS; 28 Ron Pitts CB; 29 Jerry Woods CB; Special teams (ST): 17 Don Bracken P; 13 Chris Jacke K	Practice squad: 64 Peter Shorts DT; Reserve: 82 Erik Affholter WR (IR); 74 Lester Archambeau DE (IR); 32 Dave Brown CB (PUP); 26 Chuck Cecil S (IR); 7 Don Majkowski QB (IR); 91 Brian Noble LB (IR); 52 Mike Weddington LB (IR); 68 Blaise Winter NT (IR); 47 active, 8 inactive, 1 practice squad Rookies in italics

Notable additions included LeRoy Butler, John Jurkovic, Bryce Paup and Jackie Harris

== Regular season ==
=== Schedule ===
Week	Date	Opponent	Result	Record	Venue	Attendance
1	September 9	Los Angeles Rams	**W** 36–24	1–0	Lambeau Field	57,685
2	September 16	**Chicago Bears**	**L** 13–31	1–1	Lambeau Field	58,938
3	September 23	Kansas City Chiefs	**L** 3–17	1–2	Lambeau Field	58,817
4	September 30	at **Detroit Lions**	**W** 24–21	2–2	Pontiac Silverdome	64,509
5	October 7	at **Chicago Bears**	**L** 13–27	2–3	Soldier Field	59,929
6	October 14	at **Tampa Bay Buccaneers**	**L** 14–26	2–4	Tampa Stadium	67,472
7	Bye					
8	October 28	**Minnesota Vikings**	**W** 24–10	3–4	Milwaukee County Stadium	55,125
9	November 4	San Francisco 49ers	**L** 20–24	3–5	Lambeau Field	58,835
10	November 11	at Los Angeles Raiders	**W** 29–16	4–5	Los Angeles Memorial Coliseum	50,855
11	November 18	at Phoenix Cardinals	**W** 24–21	5–5	Sun Devil Stadium	46,878
12	November 25	**Tampa Bay Buccaneers**	**W** 20–10	6–5	Milwaukee County Stadium	53,677
13	December 2	at **Minnesota Vikings**	**L** 7–23	6–6	Hubert H. Humphrey Metrodome	62,058
14	December 9	Seattle Seahawks	**L** 14–20	6–7	Milwaukee County Stadium	52,015
15	December 16	at Philadelphia Eagles	**L** 0–31	6–8	Veterans Stadium	65,627
16	December 22	**Detroit Lions**	**L** 17–24	6–9	Lambeau Field	46,700
17	December 30	at Denver Broncos	**L** 13–22	6–10	Mile High Stadium	46,943

Note: Intra-division opponents are in bold text.

=== Game summaries ===
==== Week 1: vs Los Angeles Rams ====
Week 1: Los Angeles Rams at Green Bay Packers

Quarter	1	2	3	4	Total
**Rams**	7	7	3	7	**24**
Packers	0	17	3	16	**36**

at Lambeau Field, Green Bay, Wisconsin

- Date: September 9, 1990
- Game time: 1:00 p.m. CST
- Game weather: Overcast, 68 °F (20 °C)
- TV announcers (CBS): Verne Lundquist and John Madden

Game information

**First quarter**

**Second quarter**

**Third quarter**

**Fourth quarter**

Top passers

- RAM – Jim Everett – 24/40, 340 yards, 2 TD, 2 INT
- GB – Anthony Dilweg – 20/32, 248 yards, 3 TD

Top rushers

- RAM – Curt Warner – 13 rushes, 47 yards, TD
- GB – Vince Workman – 5 rushes, 40 yards

Top receivers

- RAM – Flipper Anderson – 5 receptions, 128 yards, TD
- GB – Jeff Query – 2 receptions, 66 yards, TD

==== Week 2: vs Chicago Bears ====
Week 2: Chicago Bears at Green Bay Packers

Quarter	1	2	3	4	Total
**Bears**	0	17	7	7	**31**
Packers	7	3	3	0	**13**

at Lambeau Field, Green Bay, Wisconsin

- Date: September 16, 1990
- Game time: 1:00 p.m. CST
- Game weather: Overcast, 54 °F (12 °C)
- TV announcers (CBS): Verne Lundquist and Dan Fouts

Game information

**First quarter**

**Second quarter**

**Third quarter**

**Fourth quarter**

Top passers

- CHI – Jim Harbaugh – 11/14, 161 yards, 2 TD, INT
- GB – Anthony Dilweg – 14/28, 149 yards, INT

Top rushers

- CHI – Neal Anderson – 21 rushes, 71 yards, TD
- GB – Keith Woodside – 7 rushes, 40 yards, TD

Top receivers

- CHI – Dennis Gentry – 1 receptions, 40 yards, TD
- GB – Clarence Weathers – 6 receptions, 62 yards

==== Week 3: vs Kansas City Chiefs ====
Week 3: Kansas City Chiefs at Green Bay Packers – Game summary

Quarter	1	2	3	4	Total
**Chiefs**	0	7	0	10	**17**
Packers	0	3	0	0	**3**

at Lambeau Field, Green Bay, Wisconsin

- Date: September 23
- Game time: 12:00 p.m. CDT
- Game weather: Partly Cloudy, 52 °F (11 °C)
- Game attendance: 58,817
- Referee: Gordon McCarter
- TV announcers (NBC): Joel Meyers and Ahmad Rashad
- Recap, Game Book

Game information

**First quarter**

- No scoring plays.

**Second quarter**

- GB – Chris Jacke 46-yard field goal, 5:51. Packers 3–0. **Drive: 13 plays, 57 yards, 9:09.**
- KC – Christian Okoye 5-yard run (Nick Lowery kick), 0:59. Chiefs 7–3. **Drive: 9 plays, 80 yards, 4:52.**

**Third quarter**

- No scoring plays.

**Fourth quarter**

- KC – Nick Lowery 20-yard field goal, 10:31. Chiefs 10–3. **Drive: 4 plays, 2 yards, 1:38.**
- KC – Stan Petry 33-yard interception return (Nick Lowery kick), 2:59. Chiefs 17–3.

**Top passers**

- KC – Steve DeBerg – 9/21, 127 yards
- GB – Don Majkowski – 19/31, 171 yards, 2 INT

**Top rushers**

- KC – Christian Okoye – 23 rushes, 122 yards, TD
- GB – Brent Fullwood – 13 rushes, 47 yards

**Top receivers**

- KC – Robb Thomas – 2 receptions, 38 yards
- GB – Herman Fontenot – 6 receptions, 60 yards

==== Week 10: vs Los Angeles Raiders ====
Week 10: Green Bay Packers at Los Angeles Raiders

Quarter	1	2	3	4	Total
**Packers**	3	13	3	10	**29**
Raiders	13	3	0	0	**16**

at Los Angeles Memorial Coliseum, Los Angeles, California

- Date: November 18, 1990
- Game time: 3:05 p.m. CST
- Game weather: Overcast, 70 °F (21 °C)
- TV announcers (CBS): Brad Nessler, Dan Jiggetts

Game information

**First quarter**

**Second quarter**

**Third quarter**

**Fourth quarter**

Top passers

- GB – Don Majkowski – 16/26, 195 yards, 2 TD, INT
- RAI – Jay Schroeder – 11/23, 139 yards, 3 INT

Top rushers

- GB – Michael Haddix – 20 rushes, 69 yards
- RAI – Bo Jackson – 10 rushes, 25 yards

Top receivers

- GB – Perry Kemp – 4 receptions, 80 yards, TD
- RAI – Mervyn Fernandez – 3 receptions, 45 yards

==== Week 11: at Phoenix Cardinals ====
Week 11: Green Bay Packers at Phoenix Cardinals – Game summary

Quarter	1	2	3	4	Total
**Packers**	7	3	0	14	**24**
Cardinals	0	7	7	7	**21**

at Sun Devil Stadium, Tempe, Arizona

- Date: November 18
- Game time: 2:00 p.m. MST
- Game weather: 70 °F (21 °C)
- Game attendance: 46,878
- TV announcers (CBS): Brad Nessler, Dan Jiggetts
- Box Score

Game information

**First quarter**

- GB – Sterling Sharpe 54-yard pass from Don Majkowski (Chris Jacke kick). Packers 7–0.

**Second quarter**

- GB – Chris Jacke 21-yard field goal. Packers 10–0
- PHO – Ernie Jones 22-yard pass from Timm Rosenbach (Al Del Greco kick). Cardinals 10–7.

**Third quarter**

- PHO – Roy Green 27-yard pass from Timm Rosenbach (Al Del Greco kick). Cardinals 14–10.

**Fourth quarter**

- PHO – Ernie Jones 25-yard pass from Timm Rosenbach (Al Del Greco kick). Cardinals 21–10.
- GB – Clarence Weathers 15-yard pass from Anthony Dilweg (Chris Jacke kick). Cardinals 21–17.
- GB – Ed West 1-yard pass from Anthony Dilweg (Chris Jacke kick). Packers 24–21.

**Top passers**

- GB – Don Majkowski – 9/13, 143 yards, TD, INT
- PHO – Timm Rosenbach – 17/35, 285 yards, 3 TD, INT

**Top rushers**

- GB – Anthony Dilweg – 5 rushes, 50 yards
- PHO – Johnny Johnson – 15 rushes, 103 yards

**Top receivers**

- GB – Sterling Sharpe – 10 receptions, 157 yards, TD
- PHO – Ernie Jones – 7 receptions, 117 yards, 2 TD

==== Week 14: vs Seattle Seahawks ====
Week Fourteen: Seattle Seahawks at Green Bay Packers – Game summary

Quarter	1	2	3	4	Total
**Seahawks**	7	10	3	0	**20**
Packers	0	0	0	14	**14**

at Milwaukee County Stadium, Milwaukee, Wisconsin

- Date: December 9
- Game time: 12:01 pm local
- Game weather: clear, 45 °F (7 °C), 55% humidity, wind SW 19 miles per hour (31 km/h)
- Game attendance: 52,015
- Referee: Bob McElwee
- TV announcers (NBC): Joel Meyers & Ahmad Rashad
- Gamebook

Game information

**First quarter**

- SEA – Jeff Chadwick 8-yard pass from Dave Krieg (Norm Johnson kick), 8:45 (SEA 7–0)

**Second quarter**

- SEA – Norm Johnson 37-yard field goal, 8:11 (SEA 10–0)
- SEA – Derrick Fenner 14-yard run (Norm Johnson kick), 1:03 (SEA 17–0)

**Third quarter**

- SEA – Norm Johnson 22-yard field goal, 8:40 (SEA 20–0)

**Fourth quarter**

- GB – Perry Kemp 13-yard pass from Blair Kiel (Chris Jacke kick), 5:35 (SEA 20–7)
- GB – Ed West 18-yard pass from Blair Kiel (Chris Jacke kick), 3:32 (SEA 20–14)

**Top passers**

- SEA – Dave Krieg: 11/18, 133 yds, 1 TD, 1 INT
- GB – Blair Kiel: 23/31, 198 yds, 2 TD

**Top rushers**

- SEA – Derrick Fenner: 20 car, 112 yds, 1 TD
- GB – Michael Haddix: 4 car, 10 yds

**Top receivers**

- SEA – Jeff Chadwick: 2 rec, 51 yds, 1 TD
- GB – Jeff Query: 6 rec, 57 yds

**Team** – pass – rush – total – to

- SEA – 133 – 158 – 291 – 2
- GB – 239 – 13 – 252 – 1

=== Standings ===
NFC Central
	W	L	T	PCT	DIV	CONF	PF	PA	STK
^{(3)} Chicago Bears	11	5	0	.688	6–2	9–3	348	280	L1
Tampa Bay Buccaneers	6	10	0	.375	5–3	6–8	264	367	L2
Detroit Lions	6	10	0	.375	3–5	5–7	373	413	L1
Green Bay Packers	6	10	0	.375	3–5	5–7	271	347	L5
Minnesota Vikings	6	10	0	.375	3–5	4–8	351	326	L4
