= List of Green Bay Packers seasons =

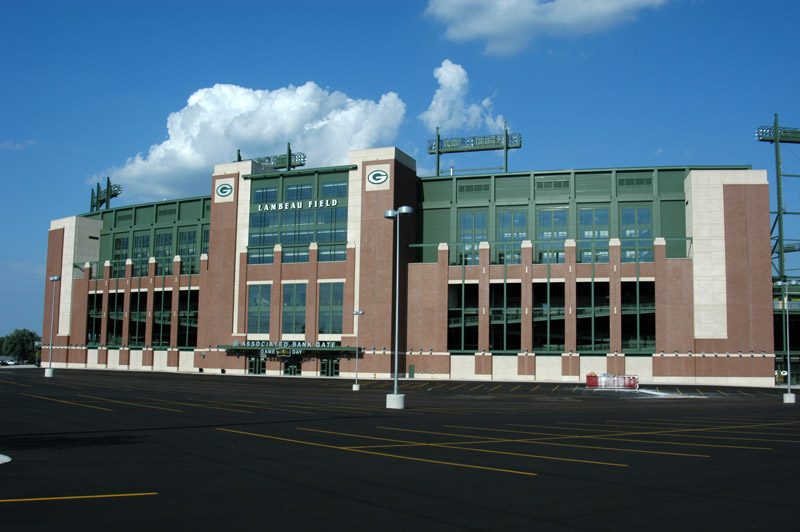
Lambeau Field, the home of the Green Bay Packers since 1957

The Green Bay Packers are a professional American football team based in Green Bay, Wisconsin. The Packers have competed in the National Football League (NFL) since 1921, two years after their original founding by Curly Lambeau and George Whitney Calhoun. They are members of the Northern Division of the National Football Conference (NFC) and play their home games at Lambeau Field in central Wisconsin. Since entering the NFL, the Packers have won 13 championships (the most in NFL history), including nine NFL Championships prior to 1966 and four Super Bowls, which is inclusive of two additional NFL Championships won during the AFL–NFL merger, since then. They have captured 21 divisional titles, 9 conference championships, and been to the playoffs 37 times. In NFL history, the Packers have recorded the most regular season victories and the most overall victories of any team, and are tied with the New England Patriots for the second most playoff wins (37).

The franchise has experienced three major periods of continued success in its history. The first period of success came under the leadership of head coach Curly Lambeau (1929–1944), when the Packers were named NFL Champions six times. This period saw the Packers become the first team to win three straight championships (1929–1931). The second period of success was between 1960 and 1967 under head coach Vince Lombardi, during which the Packers won five NFL Championships and the first two Super Bowls. The Packers also won three consecutive NFL Championships for the second time in franchise history (1965–1967). The most recent period of success ranges from 1993 to the present under the leadership of head coaches Mike Holmgren, Mike McCarthy and Matt LaFleur, where the franchise has reached the playoffs 25 times, with three Super Bowl appearances, winning two in 1996 and 2010. This period included the 2011 season, where the team won 15 games, the most the Packers have won in a single season.

The Packers have also experienced periods of extended failure in their history. The two most notable times were from (1945–1958), where the franchise never placed higher than 3rd in the league standings and recorded the worst record of any Packers team, going 1–10–1 in 1958. The second period of continued failure occurred between (1968–1991), where the club only went to the playoffs twice, and recorded only six winning seasons.

== Season-by-season records ==
Table legend
NFL champions (1920–1969) †	Super Bowl champions (1966–present) ‡	Conference champions ^{*}	Division champions ^{^}	Wild card berth ^{#}	One-game playoff berth ^{+}

Green Bay Packers seasonal records
Season	Team	League	Conference	Division	Regular season				Postseason results	Awards	Head coaches	Notes
Season	Team	League	Conference	Division	Finish	W	L	T	Postseason results	Awards	Head coaches	Notes
1919	1919	–	–	–	–	10	1	0	–	–	–	The Packers did not compete in a professional league until 1921.
1920	1920	–	–	–	–	9	1	1	–	–	–	The Packers did not compete in a professional league until 1921.
1921	1921	APFA			6th	3	2	1			Curly Lambeau	
1922	1922	NFL			7th	4	3	3			Curly Lambeau	
1923	1923	NFL			3rd	7	2	1			Curly Lambeau	
1924	1924	NFL			6th	7	4	0			Curly Lambeau	
1925	1925	NFL			9th	8	5	0			Curly Lambeau	
1926	1926	NFL			5th	7	3	3			Curly Lambeau	
1927	1927	NFL			2nd	7	2	1			Curly Lambeau	
1928	1928	NFL			4th	6	4	3			Curly Lambeau	
1929	1929	NFL^{†}			1st^{†}	12	0	1	Best Record, Named NFL Champions (1)		Curly Lambeau	
1930	1930	NFL^{†}			1st^{†}	10	3	1	Best Record, Named NFL Champions (2)		Curly Lambeau	
1931	1931	NFL^{†}			1st^{†}	12	2	0	Best Record, Named NFL Champions (3)		Curly Lambeau	This marked the first time a team has achieved three consecutive NFL championships.
1932	1932	NFL			2nd	10	3	1			Curly Lambeau	
1933	1933	NFL		West	3rd	5	7	1			Curly Lambeau	NFL teams split into two divisions, with the winner of each division playing in a championship game (the champion was previously determined by best record). Packers placed in West Division.
1934	1934	NFL		West	3rd	7	6	0			Curly Lambeau	
1935	1935	NFL		West	2nd	8	4	0			Curly Lambeau	
1936	1936	NFL^{†}		West^{^}	1st^{^}	10	1	1	Won NFL Championship (4) (at Redskins) 21–6		Curly Lambeau	
1937	1937	NFL		West	2nd	7	4	0			Curly Lambeau	
1938	1938	NFL		West^{^}	1st^{^}	8	3	0	Lost NFL Championship (at Giants) 17–23		Curly Lambeau	
1939	1939	NFL^{†}		West^{^}	1st^{^}	9	2	0	Won NFL Championship (5) (Giants) 27–0		Curly Lambeau	
1940	1940	NFL		West	2nd	6	4	1			Curly Lambeau	
1941	1941	NFL		West	1st^{+}	10	1	0	Lost Divisional Playoff (at Bears) 14–33	Don Hutson (MVP)	Curly Lambeau	
1942	1942	NFL		West	2nd	8	2	1		Don Hutson (MVP)	Curly Lambeau	
1943	1943	NFL		West	2nd	7	2	1			Curly Lambeau	
1944	1944	NFL^{†}		West^{^}	1st^{^}	8	2	0	Won NFL Championship (6) (at Giants) 14–7		Curly Lambeau	
1945	1945	NFL		West	3rd	6	4	0			Curly Lambeau	
1946	1946	NFL		West	3rd	6	5	0			Curly Lambeau	
1947	1947	NFL		West	3rd	6	5	1			Curly Lambeau	
1948	1948	NFL		West	4th	3	9	0			Curly Lambeau	
1949	1949	NFL		West	5th	2	10	0			Curly Lambeau	The Packers training ground Rockwood Lodge burns down. Curly Lambeau resigns one week later citing disagreements with the executive leadership of the team.
1950	1950	NFL	National		5th	3	9	0			Gene Ronzani	Western Division renamed to National Conference.
1951	1951	NFL	National		5th	3	9	0			Gene Ronzani	
1952	1952	NFL	National		4th	6	6	0			Gene Ronzani	
1953	1953	NFL	Western		6th	2	9	1			Gene Ronzani (2–7–1) Ray McLean / Hugh Devore (0–2)	Gene Ronzani resigned with two games remaining in the 1953 season; assistant coaches Ray McLean and Hugh Devore shared interim head coaching duties for the remainder of the season. National Conference renamed to Western Conference.
1954	1954	NFL	Western		5th	4	8	0			Lisle Blackbourn	
1955	1955	NFL	Western		3rd	6	6	0			Lisle Blackbourn	
1956	1956	NFL	Western		5th	4	8	0			Lisle Blackbourn	
1957	1957	NFL	Western		6th	3	9	0			Lisle Blackbourn	
1958	1958	NFL	Western		6th	1	10	1			Ray McLean	
1959	1959	NFL	Western		3rd	7	5	0		Vince Lombardi (COY)	Vince Lombardi	
1960	1960	NFL	Western^{*}		1st^{*}	8	4	0	Lost NFL Championship (at Eagles) 13–17		Vince Lombardi	From 1935 to 1960, NFL teams played between 10 and 12 games a season. Prior to 1935, a set number of games was not set. Starting in 1961, the NFL season was set at 14 games a year.
1961	1961	NFL^{†}	Western^{*}		1st^{*}	11	3	0	Won NFL Championship (7) (Giants) 37–0	Paul Hornung (MVP); Vince Lombardi (COY)	Vince Lombardi	
1962	1962	NFL^{†}	Western^{*}		1st^{*}	13	1	0	Won NFL Championship (8) (at Giants) 16–7	Jim Taylor (MVP)	Vince Lombardi	
1963	1963	NFL	Western		2nd^{#}	11	2	1	Won Playoff Bowl (vs. Browns) 40–23		Vince Lombardi	The Playoff Bowl is considered an unofficial, exhibition post-season game.
1964	1964	NFL	Western		2nd^{#}	8	5	1	Lost Playoff Bowl (vs. Cardinals) 17–24		Vince Lombardi	The Playoff Bowl is considered an unofficial, exhibition post-season game.
1965	1965	NFL^{†}	Western^{*}		1st^{*}	10	3	1	Won Conference Playoff (Colts) 13–10 (OT); Won NFL Championship (9) (Browns) 23–12		Vince Lombardi	
1966	1966	NFL^{‡}	Western^{*}		1st^{*}	12	2	0	Won NFL Championship (at Cowboys) 34–27; Won Super Bowl I (10) (vs. Chiefs) 35–10	Bart Starr (MVP, SB MVP)	Vince Lombardi	First season the AFL–NFL World Championship Game (later renamed the Super Bowl) is played. The Packers are recognized as both NFL Champions and AFL–NFL World Champions.
1967	1967	NFL^{‡}	Western^{*}	Central^{^}	1st^{^}	9	4	1	Won Conference Playoffs (Rams) 28–7; Won NFL Championship (Cowboys) 21–17; Won Super Bowl II (11) (vs. Raiders) 33–14	Bart Starr (SB MVP)	Vince Lombardi	The NFL split the Western Conference into two divisions, with the winner of the Central Division playing the winner of the Coastal Division for the right to play in the NFL Championship. This marked the second time the Packers have achieved three consecutive NFL championships.
1968	1968	NFL	Western	Central	3rd	6	7	1			Phil Bengtson	Vince Lombardi resigns after the 1968 season as Packers general manager one year after handing off head coaching duties to Phil Bengtson.
1969	1969	NFL	Western	Central	3rd	8	6	0			Phil Bengtson	
1970	1970	NFL	NFC	Central	3rd	6	8	0			Phil Bengtson	With the completion of the AFL–NFL merger, the Packers were placed into the Central Division of the National Football Conference (NFC).
1971	1971	NFL	NFC	Central	4th	4	8	2		John Brockington (ROY)	Dan Devine	
1972	1972	NFL	NFC	Central^{^}	1st^{^}	10	4	0	Lost Divisional Playoffs (at Redskins) 3–16	Willie Buchanon (ROY); Dan Devine (COY)	Dan Devine	
1973	1973	NFL	NFC	Central	3rd	5	7	2			Dan Devine	
1974	1974	NFL	NFC	Central	3rd	6	8	0			Dan Devine	
1975	1975	NFL	NFC	Central	3rd	4	10	0			Bart Starr	
1976	1976	NFL	NFC	Central	4th	5	9	0			Bart Starr	
1977	1977	NFL	NFC	Central	4th	4	10	0			Bart Starr	
1978	1978	NFL	NFC	Central	2nd	8	7	1			Bart Starr	The NFL expanded its season from 14 to 16 games a year.
1979	1979	NFL	NFC	Central	4th	5	11	0			Bart Starr	
1980	1980	NFL	NFC	Central	4th	5	10	1			Bart Starr	
1981	1981	NFL	NFC	Central	2nd	8	8	0			Bart Starr	
1982	1982	NFL	NFC	NA	3rd^{#}	5	3	1	Won First Round Playoffs (Cardinals) 41–16; Lost Second Round Playoffs (at Cowboys) 26–37		Bart Starr	Season shortened to nine games by a strike, with divisions temporarily suspended and standings based on conference alone.
1983	1983	NFL	NFC	Central	2nd	8	8	0			Bart Starr	
1984	1984	NFL	NFC	Central	2nd	8	8	0			Forrest Gregg	
1985	1985	NFL	NFC	Central	2nd	8	8	0			Forrest Gregg	
1986	1986	NFL	NFC	Central	4th	4	12	0			Forrest Gregg	
1987	1987	NFL	NFC	Central	3rd	5	9	1			Forrest Gregg	The strike of 1987 reduced the regular season from 16 to 15 games.
1988	1988	NFL	NFC	Central	5th	4	12	0			Lindy Infante	
1989	1989	NFL	NFC	Central	2nd	10	6	0		Lindy Infante (COY)	Lindy Infante	
1990	1990	NFL	NFC	Central	4th	6	10	0			Lindy Infante	
1991	1991	NFL	NFC	Central	4th	4	12	0			Lindy Infante	
1992	1992	NFL	NFC	Central	2nd	9	7	0		Ron Wolf (EOY)	Mike Holmgren	
1993	1993	NFL	NFC	Central	3rd^{#}	9	7	0	Won Wild Card Playoffs (at Lions) 28–24; Lost Divisional Playoffs (at Cowboys) 17–27		Mike Holmgren	
1994	1994	NFL	NFC	Central	2nd^{#}	9	7	0	Won Wild Card Playoffs (Lions) 16–12; Lost Divisional Playoffs (at Cowboys) 9–35		Mike Holmgren	
1995	1995	NFL	NFC	Central^{^}	1st^{^}	11	5	0	Won Wild Card Playoffs (Falcons) 37–20; Won Divisional Playoffs (at 49ers) 27–17; Lost NFC Championship (at Cowboys) 27–38	Brett Favre (MVP, OPOY)	Mike Holmgren	
1996	1996	NFL^{‡}	NFC^{*}	Central^{^}	1st^{^}	13	3	0	Won Divisional Playoffs (49ers) 35–14; Won NFC Championship (Panthers) 30–13; Won Super Bowl XXXI (12) (vs. Patriots) 35–21	Brett Favre (MVP); Desmond Howard (SB MVP)	Mike Holmgren	
1997	1997	NFL	NFC^{*}	Central^{^}	1st^{^}	13	3	0	Won Divisional Playoffs (Buccaneers) 21–7; Won NFC Championship (at 49ers) 23–10; Lost Super Bowl XXXII (vs. Broncos) 24–31	Brett Favre (MVP)	Mike Holmgren	Favre is first player to win three consecutive AP MVP awards.
1998	1998	NFL	NFC	Central	2nd^{#}	11	5	0	Lost Wild Card Playoffs (at 49ers) 27–30	Reggie White (DPOY)	Mike Holmgren	
1999	1999	NFL	NFC	Central	4th	8	8	0			Ray Rhodes	
2000	2000	NFL	NFC	Central	3rd	9	7	0			Mike Sherman	
2001	2001	NFL	NFC	Central	2nd^{#}	12	4	0	Won Wild Card Playoffs (49ers) 25–15; Lost Divisional Playoffs (at Rams) 17–45		Mike Sherman	
2002	2002	NFL	NFC	North^{^}	1st^{^}	12	4	0	Lost Wild Card Playoffs (Falcons) 7–27		Mike Sherman	The NFL realigned to create four divisions in both conferences with four teams in each division, with the NFC Central being renamed the NFC North.
2003	2003	NFL	NFC	North^{^}	1st^{^}	10	6	0	Won Wild Card Playoffs (Seahawks) 33–27 (OT); Lost Divisional Playoffs (at Eagles) 17–20 (OT)		Mike Sherman	
2004	2004	NFL	NFC	North^{^}	1st^{^}	10	6	0	Lost Wild Card Playoffs (Vikings) 17–31		Mike Sherman	
2005	2005	NFL	NFC	North	4th	4	12	0			Mike Sherman	
2006	2006	NFL	NFC	North	2nd	8	8	0			Mike McCarthy	
2007	2007	NFL	NFC	North^{^}	1st^{^}	13	3	0	Won Divisional Playoffs (Seahawks) 42–20; Lost NFC Championship (Giants) 20–23 (OT)	Ted Thompson (EOY)	Mike McCarthy	
2008	2008	NFL	NFC	North	3rd	6	10	0			Mike McCarthy	
2009	2009	NFL	NFC	North	2nd^{#}	11	5	0	Lost Wild Card Playoffs (at Cardinals) 45–51 (OT)	Charles Woodson (DPOY)	Mike McCarthy	
2010	2010	NFL^{‡}	NFC^{*}	North	2nd^{#}	10	6	0	Won Wild Card Playoffs (at Eagles) 21–16; Won Divisional Playoffs (at Falcons) 48–21; Won NFC Championship (at Bears) 21–14; Won Super Bowl XLV (13) (vs. Steelers) 31–25	Aaron Rodgers (SB MVP)	Mike McCarthy	
2011	2011	NFL	NFC	North^{^}	1st^{^}	15	1	0	Lost Divisional Playoffs (Giants) 20–37	Aaron Rodgers (MVP); Mike McCarthy (COY); Ted Thompson (EOY)	Mike McCarthy	
2012	2012	NFL	NFC	North^{^}	1st^{^}	11	5	0	Won Wild Card Playoffs (Vikings) 24–10; Lost Divisional Playoffs (at 49ers) 31–45		Mike McCarthy	
2013	2013	NFL	NFC	North^{^}	1st^{^}	8	7	1	Lost Wild Card Playoffs (49ers) 20–23	Eddie Lacy (ROY)	Mike McCarthy	
2014	2014	NFL	NFC	North^{^}	1st^{^}	12	4	0	Won Divisional Playoffs (Cowboys) 26–21; Lost NFC Championship (at Seahawks) 22–28 (OT)	Aaron Rodgers (MVP)	Mike McCarthy	
2015	2015	NFL	NFC	North	2nd^{#}	10	6	0	Won Wild Card Playoffs (at Redskins) 35–18; Lost Divisional Playoffs (at Cardinals) 20–26 (OT)		Mike McCarthy	
2016	2016	NFL	NFC	North^{^}	1st^{^}	10	6	0	Won Wild Card Playoffs (Giants) 38–13; Won Divisional Playoffs (at Cowboys) 34–31; Lost NFC Championship (at Falcons) 21–44	Jordy Nelson (CPOY)	Mike McCarthy	
2017	2017	NFL	NFC	North	3rd	7	9	0			Mike McCarthy	
2018	2018	NFL	NFC	North	3rd	6	9	1			Mike McCarthy (4–7–1) Joe Philbin (2–2)	Mike McCarthy was fired with four games remaining in the 2018 season; assistant coach Joe Philbin handled interim head coaching duties for the remainder of the season.
2019	2019	NFL	NFC	North^{^}	1st^{^}	13	3	0	Won Divisional Playoffs (Seahawks) 28–23; Lost NFC Championship (at 49ers) 20–37		Matt LaFleur	
2020	2020	NFL	NFC	North^{^}	1st^{^}	13	3	0	Won Divisional Playoffs (Rams) 32–18; Lost NFC Championship (Buccaneers) 26–31	Aaron Rodgers (MVP)	Matt LaFleur	
2021	2021	NFL	NFC	North^{^}	1st^{^}	13	4	0	Lost Divisional Playoffs (49ers) 10–13	Aaron Rodgers (MVP)	Matt LaFleur	Matt LaFleur becomes the first coach in NFL history to lead his team to three straight seasons of 13 wins or more; his 39 total wins is the most for any head coach in their first three seasons. The NFL expanded its season from 16 to 17 games a year.
2022	2022	NFL	NFC	North	3rd	8	9	0			Matt LaFleur	
2023	2023	NFL	NFC	North	2nd^{#}	9	8	0	Won Wild Card Playoffs (at Cowboys) 48–32; Lost Divisional Playoffs (at 49ers) 21–24		Matt LaFleur	
2024	2024	NFL	NFC	North	3rd^{#}	11	6	0	Lost Wild Card Playoffs (at Eagles) 10–22		Matt LaFleur	
2025	2025	NFL	NFC	North	2nd^{#}	9	7	1	Lost Wild Card Playoffs (at Bears) 27–31		Matt LaFleur	
2026	2026	NFL	NFC	North	4th	6	4	0			Matt LaFleur	
Totals 4 Super Bowl Championships 13 NFL Championships 3 NFC Conference Championships 6 NFL Western Conference Championships 21 Division titles						824	615	39	(1921–2025, includes only regular season)			Excludes the Packers' two seasons outside the NFL (1919 and 1920), in which they earned an additional 19 wins, 2 losses, and 1 tie.
Totals 4 Super Bowl Championships 13 NFL Championships 3 NFC Conference Championships 6 NFL Western Conference Championships 21 Division titles						37	28	—	(1921–2025, includes only playoffs)			Excludes the Packers' two seasons outside the NFL (1919 and 1920), in which they earned an additional 19 wins, 2 losses, and 1 tie.
Totals 4 Super Bowl Championships 13 NFL Championships 3 NFC Conference Championships 6 NFL Western Conference Championships 21 Division titles						861	644	39	(1921–2025, includes both regular season and playoffs)			Excludes the Packers' two seasons outside the NFL (1919 and 1920), in which they earned an additional 19 wins, 2 losses, and 1 tie.

== See also ==
- History of the Green Bay Packers
