= 1991 Green Bay Packers season =

NFL team season

- General manager: Tom Braatz; Ron Wolf
- President: Bob Harlan
- Head coach: Lindy Infante
- Home stadium: Lambeau Field; Milwaukee County Stadium

Results
- Record: 4–12
- Division place: 4th NFC Central
- Playoffs: Did not qualify
- Pro Bowlers: None

The 1991 Green Bay Packers season was their 73rd season overall and their 71st in the National Football League. The team finished with a 4–12 record under coach Lindy Infante, earning them fourth place finish in the NFC Central division and costing Infante his job. The Packers would not lose another home game to the Lions until the 2015 season.

== Offseason ==
=== NFL draft ===
1991 Green Bay Packers draft
Round	Pick	Player	Position	College	Notes
1	19	Vinnie Clark	Cornerback	Ohio State	
2	35	Esera Tuaolo	Defensive tackle	Oregon State	
3	67	Don Davey	Defensive end	Wisconsin	
3	81	Chuck Webb	Running back	Tennessee	
5	135	Jeff Fite	Punter	Memphis State	
6	149	Walter Dean	Running back	Grambling State	
6	164	Joe Garten	Center	Colorado	
7	169	Frank Blevins	Linebacker	Oklahoma	
7	176	Reggie Burnette	Linebacker	Houston	
8	203	Johnny Walker	Wide receiver	Texas	
9	229	Dean Witkowski	Linebacker	North Dakota	
10	262	Rapier Porter	Tight end	Arkansas–Pine Bluff	
11	289	J. J. Wierenga	Defensive end	Central Michigan	
12	316	Linzy Collins	Wide receiver	Missouri	
Made roster

=== Undrafted free agents ===
1991 undrafted free agents of note
Player	Position	College
Steve Cromer	Guard	Washington State
Brad Daluiso	Kicker	UCLA
Mike Finn	Defensive end	Arkansas–Pine Bluff
Art Greathouse	Running back	Arizona
Mark McCutcheon	Safety	Tennessee State
Rob Nita	Wide receiver	Wisconsin–Oshkosh
Billy Ray	Quarterback	Duke
Reggie Stewart	Linebacker	Mississippi State

== Personnel ==
=== Staff ===
1991 Green Bay Packers staff
Front office: President/Chief Executive Officer – Bob Harlan; Executive Vice President of Football Operations – 1.Tom Braatz 2. Ron Wolf; Head coaches: Head coach – Lindy Infante; Offensive coaches: Offensive backs – Willie Peete; Wide receivers – Wayne "Buddy" Geis; Tight ends – Virgil Knight; Offensive line – Charlie Davis; Assistant offensive line – Joe Clark	Defensive coaches: Defensive coordinator – Hank Bullough; Defensive line – Greg Blache; Outside linebackers – Dick Moseley; Defensive backs – Dick Jauron; Special teams coaches: Special teams – Howard Tippett; Strength and conditioning: Strength and conditioning – Russ Riederer

=== Roster ===
1991 Green Bay Packers roster
Quarterbacks (QB): 10 Blair Kiel; 7 Don Majkowski; 18 Mike Tomczak; Running backs (RB): 32 Steve Avery FB; 42 Walter Dean FB; 39 Darrell Thompson FB; 33 Keith Woodside; 46 Vince Workman; Wide receivers (WR): 82 Erik Affholter; 81 Perry Kemp; 85 Jeff Query; 84 Sterling Sharpe; 87 Clarence Weathers; 88 Charles Wilson; Tight ends (TE): 80 Jackie Harris; 86 Ed West	Offensive linemen (OL): 51 Blair Bush C; 63 James Campen C; 78 Louis Cheek LT; 72 Steve Gabbard RT; 65 Ron Hallstrom G; 77 Tony Mandarich RT; 57 Rich Moran G; 71 Reggie Singletary G; 70 Keith Uecker G; Defensive linemen (DL): 74 Lester Archambeau DE; 62 Matt Brock DE; 93 Robert Brown DE; 99 Don Davey DE; 92 John Jurkovic NT; 98 Esera Tuaolo NT	Linebackers (LB): 90 Tony Bennett OLB; 55 Reggie Burnette ILB; 56 Burnell Dent ILB; 50 Johnny Holland ILB; 91 Brian Noble ILB; 54 Scott Stephen OLB; Defensive backs (DB): 36 LeRoy Butler CB; 26 Chuck Cecil FS; 25 Vinnie Clark CB; 21 Joe Fuller CB; 24 Tim Hauck SS; 44 Jerry Holmes CB; 47 Roland Mitchell CB; 37 Mark Murphy SS; Special teams (ST): 13 Chris Jacke K; 16 Paul McJulien P	Practice squad: 6 Jeff Bridewell QB; 60 Gene Cullinane C; 49 Jerry Evans TE; 28 Doug Lloyd RB; 19 Johnny Walker WR; Reserve: 67 Billy Ard G (IR); 58 Joe Garten C (IR); 59 Kurt Larson ILB (IR); 96 Shawn Patterson DE (IR); 95 Bryce Paup OLB (IR); 31 Allen Rice RB (IR); 75 Ken Ruettgers LT (IR); 45 Vai Sikahema RB (IR); 30 Chuck Webb RB (IR); 47 active, 9 inactive, 5 practice squad Rookies in italics

== Preseason ==
Week	Date	Opponent	Result	Record	Venue
1	August 3	New England Patriots	W 28–7	1–0	Lambeau Field
2	August 10	at New Orleans Saints	L 20–31	1–1	Louisiana Superdome
3	August 17	Buffalo Bills	W 35–24	2–1	Camp Randall Stadium
4	August 24	Cincinnati Bengals	L 16–19 (OT)	2–2	Lambeau Field

== Regular season ==
=== Schedule ===
Week	Date	Opponent	Result	Record	Venue	Recap
1	September 1	Philadelphia Eagles	**L** 3–20	0–1	Lambeau Field	Recap
2	September 8	at **Detroit Lions**	**L** 14–23	0–2	Pontiac Silverdome	Recap
3	September 15	**Tampa Bay Buccaneers**	**W** 15–13	1–2	Lambeau Field	Recap
4	September 22	at Miami Dolphins	**L** 13–16	1–3	Joe Robbie Stadium	Recap
5	September 29	at Los Angeles Rams	**L** 21–23	1–4	Anaheim Stadium	Recap
6	October 6	Dallas Cowboys	**L** 17–20	1–5	Milwaukee County Stadium	Recap
7	Bye					
8	October 17	**Chicago Bears**	**L** 0–10	1–6	Lambeau Field	Recap
9	October 27	at **Tampa Bay Buccaneers**	**W** 27–0	2–6	Tampa Stadium	Recap
10	November 3	at New York Jets	**L** 16–19 (OT)	2–7	The Meadowlands	Recap
11	November 10	Buffalo Bills	**L** 24–34	2–8	Milwaukee County Stadium	Recap
12	November 17	**Minnesota Vikings**	**L** 21–35	2–9	Lambeau Field	Recap
13	November 24	Indianapolis Colts	**W** 14–10	3–9	Milwaukee County Stadium	Recap
14	December 1	at Atlanta Falcons	**L** 31–35	3–10	Atlanta–Fulton County Stadium	Recap
15	December 8	at **Chicago Bears**	**L** 13–27	3–11	Soldier Field	Recap
16	December 15	**Detroit Lions**	**L** 17–21	3–12	Lambeau Field	Recap
17	December 21	at **Minnesota Vikings**	**W** 27–7	4–12	Hubert H. Humphrey Metrodome	Recap
Note: Intra-division opponents are in **bold** text.

=== Game summaries ===
==== Week 1 vs. Philadelphia Eagles ====
Week One: Philadelphia Eagles at Green Bay Packers

Quarter	1	2	3	4	Total
**Eagles**	0	13	0	7	**20**
Packers	0	0	3	0	**3**

at Lambeau Field, Green Bay, Wisconsin

- Date: September 1, 1991
- Game time: 12:00 p.m. CST
- Game weather: 60 °F (16 °C), wind 11 mph (18 km/h)
- Referee: Pat Haggerty
- TV announcers (CBS): Brad Nessler and Dan Fouts

Game information

**First quarter**

- No scoring plays.

**Second quarter**

- PHI – Roger Ruzek 37-yard field goal – **Eagles 3–0**
- PHI – Keith Byars 32-yard pass from Jim McMahon (Roger Ruzek kick) – **Eagles 10–0**
- PHI – Roger Ruzek 40-yard field goal – **Eagles 13–0**

**Third quarter**

- GB – Chris Jacke 21-yard field goal – **Eagles 13–3**

**Fourth quarter**

- PHI – Fred Barnett 75-yard pass from Jim McMahon (Roger Ruzek kick) – **Eagles 20–3**

Top passers

- PHI – Jim McMahon – 17/25, 257 Yds, 2 TD, 2 INT
- GB – Don Majkowski – 16/42, 201 Yds, 3 INT

Top rushers

- PHI – Thomas Sanders – 23 Rush, 52 Yds
- GB – Darrell Thompson – 6 Rush, 16 Yds

Top receivers

- PHI – Keith Byars – 8 Rec, 111 Yds, TD
- GB – Sterling Sharpe – 6 Rec, 70 Yds

==== Week 2: at Detroit Lions ====
Week Two: Green Bay Packers at Detroit Lions – Game summary

Quarter	1	2	3	4	Total
Packers	0	7	7	0	**14**
**Lions**	7	3	10	3	**23**

at Pontiac Silverdome, Pontiac, Michigan

- Date: September 8
- Game time: 12:00 p.m. CST/1:00 p.m. EDT
- Game weather: None (played indoors)
- Game attendance: 43,132
- Referee: Howard Roe
- TV announcers (CBS): Sean McDonough and Irv Cross
- Box score

Game information

**First quarter**

- DET – Barry Sanders 4-yard run (Eddie Murray kick). Lions 7–0.

**Second quarter**

- GB – Vince Workman 1-yard run (Chris Jacke kick). Tied 7–7.
- DET – Eddie Murray 41-yard field goal. Lions 10–7.

**Third quarter**

- DET – Willie Green 12-yard pass from Rodney Peete (Eddie Murray kick). Lions 17–7.
- DET – Eddie Murray 27-yard field goal. Lions 20–7.
- GB – Don Majkowski 2-yard run (Chris Jacke kick). Lions 20–14.

**Fourth quarter**

- DET – Eddie Murray 36-yard field goal. Lions 23–14.

**Top passers**

- GB – Don Majkowski – 20/28, 185 yards, INT
- DET – Rodney Peete – 25/38, 271 yards, TD

**Top rushers**

- GB – Darrell Thompson – 14 rushes, 45 yards
- DET – Barry Sanders – 18 rushes, 42 yards, TD

**Top receivers**

- GB – Perry Kemp – 8 receptions, 66 yards
- DET – Robert Clark – 10 receptions, 143 yards

==== Week 3: vs. Tampa Bay Buccaneers ====
Week Three: Tampa Bay Buccaneers at Green Bay Packers

Quarter	1	2	3	4	Total
Buccaneers	0	0	3	10	**13**
**Packers**	0	5	0	10	**15**

at Lambeau Field, Green Bay, Wisconsin

- Date: September 15, 1991
- Game time: 12:00 p.m. CST
- Game weather: 75 °F (24 °C), wind 14 mph (23 km/h)

Game information

**First quarter**

**Second quarter**

**Third quarter**

**Fourth quarter**

Top passers

- TB – Vinny Testaverde – 19/30, 278 yards, TD, INT
- GB – Don Majkowski – 20/39, 258 yards, TD, INT

Top rushers

- TB – Robert Wilson – 3 rushes, 28 yards
- GB – Allen Rice – 10 rushes, 49 yards

Top receivers

- TB – Willie Drewrey – 2 receptions, 96 yards, TD
- GB – Sterling Sharpe – 6 receptions, 95 yards

==== Week 6: vs. Dallas Cowboys ====
Week Six: Dallas Cowboys at Green Bay Packers

Quarter	1	2	3	4	Total
Cowboys	0	14	3	3	**20**
**Packers**	0	3	7	7	**17**

at Milwaukee County Stadium, Milwaukee, Wisconsin

- Date: October 6, 1991
- Game time: 12:00 p.m. CST
- Game weather: Overcast, 44 °F (7 °C)
- TV announcers (CBS): James Brown and Randy Cross

Game information

**First quarter**

**Second quarter**

**Third quarter**

**Fourth quarter**

Top passers

- DAL – Troy Aikman – 31/41, 287 yards, TD
- GB – Blair Kiel – 18/35, 212 yards, TD, 2 INT

Top rushers

- DAL – Emmitt Smith – 32 rushes, 122 yards
- GB – Vince Workman – 6 rushes, 22 yards

Top receivers

- DAL – Jay Novacek – 11 receptions, 121 yards, TD
- GB – Sterling Sharpe – 4 receptions, 65 yards, TD

==== Week 13: vs. Indianapolis Colts ====
Week Thirteen: Indianapolis Colts at Green Bay Packers

Quarter	1	2	3	4	Total
Colts	0	3	0	7	**10**
**Packers**	7	0	7	0	**14**

at Milwaukee County Stadium, Milwaukee, Wisconsin

- Date: November 24, 1991
- Game time: 12:00 p.m. CST
- Game weather: 28 °F (−2.2 °C), relative humidity 80%, wind 18 miles per hour (29 km/h; 16 kn), wind chill 16 °F (−8.9 °C)

Game information

**First quarter**

**Second quarter**

**Third quarter**

**Fourth quarter**

Top passers

- IND – Jeff George – 21/40, 184 yards, TD, INT
- GB – Mike Tomczak – 5/17, 50 yards

Top rushers

- IND – Ken Clark – 19 rushes, 51 yards
- GB – Darrell Thompson – 15 rushes, 63 yards

Top receivers

- IND – Bill Brooks – 10 receptions, 70 yards, TD
- GB – Jackie Harris – 1 reception, 19 yards

==== Week 16: vs. Detroit Lions ====
Week Sixteen: Detroit Lions at Green Bay Packers – Game summary

Quarter	1	2	3	4	Total
**Lions**	7	0	0	14	**21**
Packers	7	3	0	7	**17**

at Lambeau Field, Green Bay, Wisconsin

- Date: December 15
- Game time: 12:00 p.m. CST
- Game weather: 10 °F (−12 °C)
- Game attendance: 43,881
- Referee: Larry Nemmers
- TV announcers (CBS): James Brown and Randy Cross
- Box score

Game information

**First quarter**

- GB – Vince Workman 30-yard run (Chris Jacke kick). Packers 7–0.
- DET – Robert Clark 19-yard pass from Erik Kramer (Eddie Murray kick). Tied 7–7.

**Second quarter**

- GB – Chris Jacke 23-yard field goal. Packers 10–7.

**Third quarter**

- No scoring plays

**Fourth quarter**

- DET – Robert Clark 3-yard pass from Erik Kramer (Eddie Murray kick). Lions 14–10.
- DET – Mel Gray 78-yard punt return (Eddie Murray kick). Lions 21–10.
- GB – Vince Workman 12-yard pass from Mike Tomczak (Chris Jacke kick). Lions 21–17.

**Top passers**

- DET – Erik Kramer – 14/29, 131 yards, 2 TD
- GB – Mike Tomczak – 18/40, 207 yards, TD, INT

**Top rushers**

- DET – Barry Sanders – 27 rushes, 85 yards
- GB – Darrell Thompson – 15 rushes, 71 yards

**Top receivers**

- DET – Mike Farr – 7 receptions, 59 yards
- GB – Sterling Sharpe – 6 receptions, 83 yards

=== Standings ===
NFC Central
	W	L	T	PCT	DIV	CONF	PF	PA	STK
^{(2)} Detroit Lions	12	4	0	.750	6–2	8–4	339	295	W6
^{(4)} Chicago Bears	11	5	0	.688	7–1	9–3	299	269	L1
Minnesota Vikings	8	8	0	.500	3–5	8–6	301	306	L1
Green Bay Packers	4	12	0	.250	3–5	3–9	273	313	W1
Tampa Bay Buccaneers	3	13	0	.188	1–7	2–10	199	365	W1
