= 1993 Green Bay Packers season =

NFL team season

- General manager: Ron Wolf
- President: Bob Harlan
- Head coach: Mike Holmgren
- Offensive coordinator: Sherman Lewis
- Defensive coordinator: Ray Rhodes
- Home stadium: Lambeau Field; Milwaukee County Stadium

Results
- Record: 9–7
- Division place: 3rd NFC Central
- Playoffs: Won Wild Card Playoffs (at Lions) 28–24; Lost Divisional Playoffs (at Cowboys) 17–27
- Pro Bowlers: QB Brett Favre; WR Sterling Sharpe; DE Reggie White; SS LeRoy Butler

The 1993 season was the Green Bay Packers' 73rd season in the National Football League (NFL), their 75th overall. They had a 9–7 record and won their first playoff berth in 11 years, but their first in a non-strike year in 21 years. The record also marked the first back-to-back winning season since the Packers 1967 season. During the regular season, the Packers finished with 340 points, ranking sixth in the National Football League, and allowed 282 points, ranking ninth. In his third year as a pro and second with the Packers, quarterback Brett Favre led the Packers offense, passing for 3,303 yards and 19 touchdowns. Favre, who played his first full season, was selected to his second of eleven Pro Bowl appearances.

In the playoffs, the Packers played in the NFC Wild Card Game against the Detroit Lions. The Packers pulled off the upset, winning 28–24, closing with a 40-yard touchdown pass from Favre to Sterling Sharpe with 55 seconds left. In the NFC Divisional Playoff Game, the Packers played the defending and eventual repeat Super Bowl champion Dallas Cowboys, losing 27–17.

The Packers commemorated their 75th overall season of professional football in 1993 with a "75" logo uniform patch, one year before the NFL's diamond anniversary.

== Offseason ==
=== Free agents ===
In the off season, the Packers signed future Pro Football Hall of Famer Reggie White in one of the biggest moves in Packers history.

| Additions | Subtractions |
|---|---|
| DE Reggie White (Eagles) | QB Don Majkowski (Colts) |
| WR Louis Clark (Seahawks) | S Chuck Cecil (Cardinals) |
| WR Mark Clayton (Dolphins) | OT Tootie Robbins (Saints) |
| G Harry Galbreath (Dolphins) | RB Vince Workman (Buccaneers) |
| OT Tunch Ilkin (Steelers) | S Adrian White (Patriots) |
| S Mike Prior (Colts) | G Ron Hallstrom (Eagles) |
| DT Bill Maas (Chiefs) | LB Burnell Dent (Lions) |
| DE David Grant (Buccaneers) | |
| WR Jamie Holland (Browns) | |
| LB Ervin Randle (Chiefs) | |
| OT Rory Graves | |
| RB John Stephens (Patriots) | |
| QB Ken O'Brien (Jets) | |
| WR James Milling (Falcons) | |

=== 1993 NFL draft ===
The Green Bay Packers selected Linebacker Wayne Simmons in the first round of the 1993 NFL draft. In the fifth round the Packers drafted quarterback Mark Brunell, who would later become Jacksonville Jaguars career passing yards leader.

1993 Green Bay Packers draft
| Round | Pick | Player | Position | College | Notes |
| 1 | 15 | Wayne Simmons | Linebacker | Clemson | |
| 1 | 29 | George Teague | Free Safety | Alabama | |
| 3 | 81 | Earl Dotson | Offensive tackle | Texas A&M–Kingsville | |
| 5 | 118 | Mark Brunell * | Quarterback | Washington | |
| 5 | 119 | James Willis | Linebacker | Auburn | |
| 6 | 141 | Doug Evans | Cornerback | Louisiana Tech | |
| 6 | 152 | Paul Hutchins | Offensive tackle | Western Michigan | |
| 6 | 156 | Tim Watson | Safety | Howard | |
| 7 | 183 | Bob Kuberski | Defensive tackle | Navy | |
Made roster * Made at least one Pro Bowl during career

=== Undrafted free agents ===
1993 undrafted free agents of note
| Player | Position | College |
|---|---|---|
| Lionell Crawford | Wide receiver | Wisconsin |
| Casey Greer | Safety | Miami (FL) |
| Justin Hall | Guard | Notre Dame |
| J. J. Lasley | Fullback | Stanford |
| Josh Miller | Punter | Arizona |
| Nick Smith | Linebacker | Notre Dame |
| Rich Thompson | Kicker | Wisconsin |
| Matt Turk | Punter | UW Whitewater |

== Staff ==
1993 Green Bay Packers staff
| Front office: President/chief executive officer – Bob Harlan; Executive vice-president/general manager – Ron Wolf; Director of pro personnel – Jesse Kaye; Director of college scouting – John Math; Assistant Director of pro personnel – Ted Thompson; Head coaches: Head coach – Mike Holmgren; Offensive coaches: Offensive coordinator – Sherman Lewis; Quarterbacks – Steve Mariucci; Running backs – Gil Haskell; Wide receivers – Jon Gruden; Offensive line – Tom Lovat; Assistant offensive line/tight ends – Andy Reid | Defensive coaches: Defensive coordinator – Ray Rhodes; Defensive line – Greg Blache; Linebackers – Bob Valesente; Defensive backs/secondary – Dick Jauron; Defensive assistant/quality control – Jim Lind; Special teams coaches: Special teams – Nolan Cromwell; Strength and conditioning: Strength and conditioning – Kent Johnston |

== Roster ==
1993 Green Bay Packers roster
| Quarterbacks (QB): 8 Mark Brunell; 11 Ty Detmer; 4 Brett Favre; Running backs (RB): 34 Edgar Bennett FB; 44 Dexter McNabb FB; 39 Darrell Thompson; 20 Kevin Williams; 29 Marcus Wilson; Wide receivers (WR): 87 Robert Brooks; 83 Mark Clayton; 85 Ron Lewis; 81 Anthony Morgan; 84 Sterling Sharpe; Tight ends (TE): 89 Mark Chmura; 80 Jackie Harris; 88 Darryl Ingram; 86 Ed West | Offensive linemen (OL): 72 Earl Dotson RT; 76 Harry Galbreath G; 67 Paul Hutchins LT; 79 Tunch Ilkin RT; 75 Ken Ruettgers LT; 68 Joe Sims RT; 74 Doug Widell G; 52 Frank Winters C; 60 Lance Zeno C; Defensive linemen (DL): 62 Matt Brock DE; 93 Gilbert Brown NT; 99 Don Davey DE; 98 David Grant DE; 64 John Jurkovic NT; 97 Matt LaBounty DE; 77 Bill Maas NT; 92 Reggie White DE | Linebackers (LB): 90 Tony Bennett OLB; 54 Keo Coleman OLB; 50 Johnny Holland ILB; 53 George Koonce ILB; 51 Jim Morrissey OLB; 55 Joe Mott OLB; 95 Bryce Paup OLB; 59 Wayne Simmons OLB; Defensive backs (DB): 27 Terrell Buckley CB; 36 LeRoy Butler SS; 33 Doug Evans CB; 30 Corey Harris CB; 24 Tim Hauck SS; 47 Roland Mitchell CB; 45 Mike Prior FS; 31 George Teague FS; 23 Sammy Walker CB; Special teams (ST): 13 Chris Jacke K; 9 Bryan Wagner P | Practice squad: 70 Terry Beauford G; 26 Lionell Crawford WR; 17 Craig Hentrich P; -- Jason McGill WR; 69 Malcolm Showell NT; Reserve: 63 James Campen C (IR); 58 Mark D'Onofrio OLB (PUP); 94 Bob Kuberski DT (Military); 41 James Milling WR (IR); 57 Rich Moran G (IR); 61 Tom Neville G (IR); 91 Brian Noble ILB (IR); 96 Shawn Patterson DE (IR); 73 Tootie Robbins RT (IR); 56 James Willis ILB (IR); 53 active, 10 inactive, 5 practice squad Rookies in italics |

== Regular season ==
=== Opening week ===
The Green Bay Packers started the season strong with a 36–6 win over the Los Angeles Rams. The Packers showed a strong defense and offense in the win. The Rams finished with 53-yards rushing, and Bryce Paup and George Koonce were able to record a safety on one play. Rams quarterback, Jim Everett completed 17 of 41 passes for 175 yards and two interceptions. The offense recorded 381 total yards, scoring in six of eight possessions. Quarterback Brett Favre completed 19 of 29 passes for 264 yards and two touchdowns. For one of the touchdowns, Favre completed a 50-yard touchdown pass to Sterling Sharpe, who finished with seven catches for 120 yards.

=== Three game skid ===
After the strong start against the Rams, the Packers lost the following three games. The first came in a 20–17 loss to the Philadelphia Eagles at Lambeau Field. Despite gaining a 17–7 lead in the third quarter, the Packers only managed 159 yards of total offense in the game. Starting linebacker Brian Noble left the field with a season-ending injury as the Eagles were able to rally from behind. The Eagles gained the lead with under five minutes to play when Randall Cunningham escaped a sack from former teammate Reggie White, and firing a 40-yard touchdown pass to Eagles receiver Victor Bailey. Following a bye week, the Packers traveled to the Metrodome to play the Minnesota Vikings. The Packers again fell short of victory in the closing seconds of the game. The Packers were leading 13–12 before Jim McMahon completed a 45-yard pass on third and ten to Eric Guliford, who was wide open. With four seconds left, Vikings kicker Fuad Reveiz completed his fifth field goal to give the Vikings a 15–13 victory. The following week, the Packers lost their third straight to defending and eventual repeat Super Bowl champions, the Dallas Cowboys.

=== Winning streak ===
After losing three of their first four games, the Packers proceeded to win six of their next seven, defeating four conference opponents. The Packers won their second game of the season, narrowly defeating the Denver Broncos on Brett Favre's birthday. At halftime the Packers held a 30–7 lead, scoring on each of their first six possessions. Brett Favre passed for 182 yards in the first half, including a 66-yard touchdown pass to Jackie Harris. John Stephens and Edgar Bennett each scored one-yard touchdown runs and Chris Jackie made three field goals. In the second half the Packers gained only 61 yards on offense. Brett Favre threw three interceptions, including one which was returned for a touchdown. Broncos quarterback John Elway completed 33 of 59 passes for 367 yards and a touchdown, helping to close the Packers lead to 30–27. The Broncos had a chance to tie or win the game on their last drive, but came up short when Reggie White was able to sack John Elway twice. After the win the Packers had another bye week.

In week eight the Packers defeated the Tampa Bay Buccaneers 37–14, bringing their record to 3–3. Brett Favre completed 20 of 35 passes for 268 yards. Sterling Sharpe caught a career-high four touchdown passes, tying a Green Bay Packer record held by Don Hutson. For the second week in a row the Packers faced a conference opponent. They defeated the Chicago Bears 17–3 and forced seven sacks and three turnovers in the game.

=== The Beginning of the Lambeau Leap ===
The Packers beat the Raiders in the final home game of the regular season. But this game will be remembered for the first recorded iteration of the signature celebration at Packer home games, the Lambeau Leap. Packer LeRoy Butler forced a fumble from Raider quarterback Vince Evans that Reggie White recovered. After running 10 yards, White lateraled the ball to Butler, who ran the remaining 25 yards into the end zone. Butler then made the leap into the south bleachers and arms of the celebrating home town fans. The true first "Leap" came the week before at Milwaukee County Stadium.

=== Schedule ===
| Week | Date | Opponent | Result | Game site | Record | Attendance |
|---|---|---|---|---|---|---|
| 1 | September 5 | Los Angeles Rams | W 36–6 | Milwaukee County Stadium | 1–0 | 54,648 |
| 2 | September 12 | Philadelphia Eagles | L 17–20 | Lambeau Field | 1–1 | 59,061 |
| 3 | Bye | | | | | |
| 4 | September 26 | at Minnesota Vikings | L 13–15 | Metrodome | 1–2 | 61,746 |
| 5 | October 3 | at Dallas Cowboys | L 14–36 | Texas Stadium | 1–3 | 63,568 |
| 6 | October 10 | Denver Broncos | W 30–27 | Lambeau Field | 2–3 | 58,943 |
| 7 | Bye | | | | | |
| 8 | October 24 | at Tampa Bay Buccaneers | W 37–14 | Tampa Stadium | 3–3 | 47,354 |
| 9 | October 31 | Chicago Bears | W 17–3 | Lambeau Field | 4–3 | 58,945 |
| 10 | November 8 | at Kansas City Chiefs | L 16–23 | Arrowhead Stadium | 4–4 | 76,742 |
| 11 | November 14 | at New Orleans Saints | W 19–17 | Louisiana Superdome | 5–4 | 69,043 |
| 12 | November 21 | Detroit Lions | W 26–17 | Milwaukee County Stadium | 6–4 | 55,119 |
| 13 | November 28 | Tampa Bay Buccaneers | W 13–10 | Lambeau Field | 7–4 | 56,995 |
| 14 | December 5 | at Chicago Bears | L 17–30 | Soldier Field | 7–5 | 62,236 |
| 15 | December 12 | at San Diego Chargers | W 20–13 | Jack Murphy Stadium | 8–5 | 57,930 |
| 16 | December 19 | Minnesota Vikings | L 17–21 | Milwaukee County Stadium | 8–6 | 54,773 |
| 17 | December 26 | Los Angeles Raiders | W 28–0 | Lambeau Field | 9–6 | 54,482 |
| 18 | January 2, 1994 | at Detroit Lions | L 20–30 | Pontiac Silverdome | 9–7 | 77,510 |
| WC | January 8, 1994 | at Detroit Lions | W 28–24 | Pontiac Silverdome | 10–7 | 68,479 |
| DC | January 16, 1994 | at Dallas Cowboys | L 17–27 | Texas Stadium | 10–8 | 64,790 |

=== Game summaries ===
==== Week 1 vs. Rams ====
Los Angeles Rams (0–0) at Green Bay Packers (0–0)

| Quarter | 1 | 2 | 3 | 4 | Total |
|---|---|---|---|---|---|
| Rams | 3 | 3 | 0 | 0 | 6 |
| Packers | 9 | 10 | 14 | 3 | 36 |

at Milwaukee County Stadium, Milwaukee, Wisconsin

- Date: September 5, 1993
- Game time: 12:00 p.m. CST
- Game weather: Overcast, 67 °F (19 °C)
- Game attendance: 54,648
- Referee: Ed Hochuli
- TV announcers (CBS): James Brown and Dan Jiggetts
- Pro-Football-Reference.com, The Football Database

Game information

First quarter

- GB – Safety, Cleveland Gary tackled by Brian Noble in end zone, 10:48. Packers 2–0.
- LA – Tony Zendejas 31-yard field goal, 8:29. Rams 3–2. Drive:
- GB – Sterling Sharpe 50-yard pass from Brett Favre (Chris Jacke kick), 7:10. Packers 9–3. Drive:

Second quarter

- GB – Chris Jacke 51-yard field goal, 12:17. Packers 12–3. Drive:
- LA – Tony Zendejas 32-yard field goal, 3:47. Packers 12–6. Drive:
- GB – Mark Clayton 4-yard pass from Brett Favre (Chris Jacke kick), 0:40. Packers 19–6. Drive:

Third quarter

- GB – Edgar Bennett 11-yard run (Chris Jacke kick), 8:28. Packers 26–6. Drive:
- GB – Edgar Bennett 1-yard run (Chris Jacke kick), 3:30. Packers 33–6. Drive:

Fourth quarter

- GB – Chris Jacke 33-yard field goal, 1:57. Packers 36–6. Drive:

Top passers

- LA – Jim Everett – 17/41, 175 yards, 2 INT
- GB – Brett Favre – 19/29, 264 yards, 2 TD, INT

Top rushers

- LA – Cleveland Gary – 13 rushes, 31 yards
- GB – John Stephens – 17 rushes, 75 yards

Top receivers

- LA – Troy Drayton – 2 receptions, 45 yards
- GB – Sterling Sharpe – 7 receptions, 120 yards, TD

==== Week 2: vs. Philadelphia Eagles ====
Week Two: Philadelphia Eagles at Green Bay Packers

| Quarter | 1 | 2 | 3 | 4 | Total |
|---|---|---|---|---|---|
| Eagles | 0 | 7 | 0 | 13 | 20 |
| Packers | 7 | 3 | 7 | 0 | 17 |

at Lambeau Field, Green Bay, Wisconsin

- Date: September 12, 1993
- Game time: 12:00 p.m. CST
- Game weather: 64 °F (18 °C), wind 12 mph (19 km/h)
- TV announcers (CBS): Verne Lundquist and John Madden

Game information

First quarter

Second quarter

Third quarter

Fourth quarter

Top passers

- PHI – Randall Cunningham – 23/29, 209 yards, 2 TD, INT
- GB – Brett Favre – 12/24, 111 yards, 2 TD, 2 INT

Top rushers

- PHI – Heath Sherman – 17 rushes, 71 yards
- GB – Vince Workman – 25 rushes, 89 yards

Top receivers

- PHI – Mark Bavaro – 5 receptions, 56 yards, TD
- GB – Sterling Sharpe – 7 receptions, 72 yards, TD

==== Week 4: at Minnesota Vikings ====
Week Four: Green Bay Packers at Minnesota Vikings

| Quarter | 1 | 2 | 3 | 4 | Total |
|---|---|---|---|---|---|
| Packers | 7 | 3 | 0 | 3 | 13 |
| Vikings | 3 | 3 | 6 | 3 | 15 |

at Hubert H. Humphrey Metrodome, Minneapolis, Minnesota

- Date: September 26, 1993
- Game time: 12:00 p.m. CST
- Game weather: None (indoor stadium)
- Game attendance: 61,077
- TV announcers (CBS): Verne Lundquist and Dan Fouts
- Pro-Football-Reference.com, NFL Game Book

Game information

First quarter

- GB – Brett Favre 2-yard run (Chris Jacke kick), 6:05. Packers 7–0. Drive: 14 plays, 85 yards, 8:55.
- MIN – Fuad Reveiz 35-yard field goal, 1:35. Packers 7–3. Drive: 4 plays, 9 yards, 2:06.

Second quarter

- MIN – Fuad Reveiz 19-yard field goal, 4:31. Packers 7–6. Drive: 17 plays, 81 yards, 9:41.
- GB – Chris Jacke 49-yard field goal, 0:03. Packers 10–6. Drive: 13 plays, 47 yards, 4:28.

Third quarter

- MIN – Fuad Reveiz 29-yard field goal, 10:50. Packers 10–9. Drive: 9 plays, 44 yards, 4:10.
- MIN – Fuad Reveiz 51-yard field goal, 5:35. Vikings 12–10. Drive: 8 plays, 39 yards, 2:26.

Fourth quarter

- GB – Chris Jacke 20-yard field goal, 13:48. Packers 13–12. Drive: 7 plays, 40 yards, 4:06.
- MIN – Fuad Reveiz 22-yard field goal, 0:04. Vikings 15–13. Drive: 11 plays, 78 yards, 1:49.

Top passers

- GB – Brett Favre – 20/31, 150 yards, 2 INT
- MIN – Jim McMahon – 18/35, 217 yards

Top rushers

- GB – John Stephens – 8 rushes, 62 yards
- MIN – Barry Word – 19 rushes, 65 yards

Top receivers

- GB – Edgar Bennett – 6 receptions, 49 yards
- MIN – Eric Guliford – 1 reception, 45 yards

==== Week 5: @ Dallas Cowboys ====
Week 5: Green Bay Packers vs. Dallas Cowboys

| Quarter | 1 | 2 | 3 | 4 | Total |
|---|---|---|---|---|---|
| Packers | 7 | 0 | 7 | 0 | 14 |
| Cowboys | 10 | 6 | 13 | 7 | 36 |

- Date: October 3
- Game time: 12:00 PM CDT
- Referee: Tom White
- TV announcers (CBS): Verne Lundquist and Dan Fouts

==== Week 6: vs. Denver Broncos ====
Week 6: Denver Broncos vs. Green Bay Packers

| Quarter | 1 | 2 | 3 | 4 | Total |
|---|---|---|---|---|---|
| Broncos | 0 | 7 | 14 | 6 | 27 |
| Packers | 17 | 13 | 0 | 0 | 30 |

at Lambeau Field in Green Bay, Wisconsin

- Date: October 10
- Game time: 6:30 PM
- Referee: Larry Nemmers
- TV announcers (TNT): Gary Bender (play-by-play), Pat Haden (color commentator), and Craig Sager (sideline reporter)

==== Week 8: @ Tampa Bay Buccaneers ====
Week 8: Green Bay Packers vs. Tampa Bay Buccaneers

| Quarter | 1 | 2 | 3 | 4 | Total |
|---|---|---|---|---|---|
| Packers | 7 | 17 | 6 | 7 | 37 |
| Buccaneers | 0 | 0 | 7 | 7 | 14 |

at Tampa Stadium in Tampa, Florida

- Date: October 24
- Game time: 1:00 PM EDT
- Referee: Ron Blum
- TV announcers (CBS): James Brown and Hank Stram

==== Week 12: vs. Detroit Lions ====
| Quarter | 1 | 2 | 3 | 4 | Total |
|---|---|---|---|---|---|
| Lions | 0 | 7 | 10 | 0 | 17 |
| Packers | 10 | 3 | 3 | 10 | 26 |

at Milwaukee County Stadium in Milwaukee, Wisconsin

- Date: November 21
- Game time: 12:00 PM CDT
- Referee: Dale Hamer
- TV announcers (CBS): Dick Stockton and Randy Cross

==== Week 14: @ Chicago Bears ====
| Quarter | 1 | 2 | 3 | 4 | Total |
|---|---|---|---|---|---|
| Packers | 7 | 0 | 10 | 0 | 17 |
| Bears | 7 | 3 | 10 | 10 | 30 |

at Soldier Field in Chicago

- Date: December 5, 1993
- Game time: 12:00 PM EDT
- Referee: Gerald Austin
- TV announcers (CBS): Jim Nantz and Randy Cross

==== Week 16: vs. Minnesota Vikings ====
Week 16: Minnesota Vikings vs. Green Bay Packers (in Milwaukee)

| Quarter | 1 | 2 | 3 | 4 | Total |
|---|---|---|---|---|---|
| Vikings | 0 | 7 | 7 | 7 | 21 |
| Packers | 3 | 7 | 0 | 7 | 17 |

at Milwaukee County Stadium in Milwaukee, Wisconsin

- Date: December 19
- Game time: 12:00 PM CDT
- Referee: Jerry Markbreit
- TV announcers (CBS): Jim Nantz and Randy Cross

== Standings ==
NFC Central
| | W | L | T | PCT | PF | PA | STK |
|---|---|---|---|---|---|---|---|
| ^{(3)} Detroit Lions | 10 | 6 | 0 | .625 | 298 | 292 | W2 |
| ^{(5)} Minnesota Vikings | 9 | 7 | 0 | .563 | 277 | 290 | W3 |
| ^{(6)} Green Bay Packers | 9 | 7 | 0 | .563 | 340 | 282 | L1 |
| Chicago Bears | 7 | 9 | 0 | .438 | 234 | 230 | L4 |
| Tampa Bay Buccaneers | 5 | 11 | 0 | .313 | 237 | 376 | L1 |

== Awards and records ==
- Brett Favre, NFC leader, attempts: 522
- Brett Favre, NFC leader, completions: 318
- Brett Favre, NFC leader, interceptions (tied): 24
- Robert Brooks, NFL kickoff return leader
- Sterling Sharpe, NFL leader in receptions: 112
- Sterling Sharpe, franchise record, most receptions in a season: 112

=== Milestones ===
- Brett Favre, first 400 yard passing game (December 5)
- Sterling Sharpe, fifth 1,000 Yard receiving season
