= Cardiac Pack =

Cardiac Pack may refer to:

- The nickname for the 1989 Green Bay Packers team
- The nickname for the NC State Wolfpack men's basketball team under coach Jim Valvano
