= 1988 Green Bay Packers season =

NFL team season

- General manager: Tom Braatz
- Head coach: Lindy Infante
- Home stadium: Lambeau Field; Milwaukee County Stadium

Results
- Record: 4–12
- Division place: 5th NFC Central
- Playoffs: Did not qualify
- Pro Bowlers: None

The 1988 Green Bay Packers season was their 70th season overall and their 68th in the National Football League (NFL). Before the season began, the team hired Lindy Infante to be their head coach. Unable to improve on their 5–9–1 record from 1987, the Packers instead went 4–12 for their third consecutive losing season, as well as their sixth consecutive non-winning season, and failed to qualify for the playoffs for the sixth consecutive season. Because the Packers played 2 games against the Lions and lost both of them, even though they both went 4–12, the Packers were actually a weaker team than the Lions, thus putting the Packers fifth and last in the NFC Central.

== Offseason ==
=== NFL draft ===
1988 Green Bay Packers draft
Round	Pick	Player	Position	College	Notes
1	7	Sterling Sharpe * ^{†}	Wide receiver	South Carolina	
2	34	Shawn Patterson	Defensive end	Arizona State	
3	61	Keith Woodside	Running back	Texas A&M	
4	88	Rollin Putzier	Defensive tackle	Oregon	
4	89	Chuck Cecil *	Safety	Arizona	
5	116	Darrell Reed	Linebacker	Oklahoma	
6	144	Nate Hill	Defensive end	Auburn	
7	173	Gary Richard	Cornerback	Pittsburgh	
8	200	Patrick Collins	Running back	Oklahoma	
9	228	Neal Wilkinson	Tight end	James Madison	
10	256	Bud Keyes	Quarterback	Wisconsin	
12	312	Scott Bolton	Wide receiver	Auburn	
Made roster † Pro Football Hall of Fame * Made at least one Pro Bowl during career

=== Undrafted free agents ===
1988 undrafted free agents of note
Player	Position	College
Stephone Avery	Cornerback	Northeast Louisiana
Erik Campbell	Defensive back	Michigan
Dewey Dorough	Wide receiver	Colorado State
Thomas Flesher	Defensive end	Weber State
Wes Gross	Offensive line	Utah State
Todd Gregoire	Kicker	Wisconsin
Thomas Harper	Linebacker	Houston
Frank Harris	Tight end	Northern Michigan
John Kidder	Guard	UCLA
Jeff McComb	Punter	Southern Utah
John Nairn	Defensive back	Colorado
Eddie Parker	Defensive back	Temple
John Phillips	Offensive line	Clemson
Paul Pomfret	Tight end	Penn State
Pat Shurmur	Center	Michigan State
Matt Soraghan	Linebacker	Southwest Missouri State
Pat Taylor	Linebacker	Arizona State
Tom Whelihan	Kicker	Missouri
Phil Zelinski	Linebacker	Central Michigan

Sean Russell Wide Receiver University of California Santa Barbara

== Personnel ==
=== Staff ===
1988 Green Bay Packers staff
Front office: President – Robert J. Parins; Executive vice-president of administration – Bob Harlan; Executive vice-president of football operations – Tom Braatz; Head coaches: Head coach – Lindy Infante; Offensive coaches: Offensive backs – Willie Peete; Wide receivers – Wayne "Buddy" Geis; Tight ends – Virgil Knight; Offensive line – Charlie Davis; Offensive assistant – Joe Clark	Defensive coaches: Defensive coordinator – Hank Bullough; Defensive line – Greg Blache; Outside linebackers – Dick Moseley; Defensive backs – Dick Jauron; Special teams coaches: Special teams – Howard Tippett; Strength and conditioning: Strength and conditioning – Virgil Knight

=== Roster ===
1988 Green Bay Packers roster
Quarterbacks (QB): 10 Blair Kiel; 7 Don Majkowski; Running backs (RB): 30 Paul Ott Carruth; 25 Patrick Collins; 36 Kenneth Davis; 21 Brent Fullwood; 34 Larry Mason; 45 Lavale Thomas; 33 Keith Woodside; Wide receivers (WR): 82 Scott Bolton; 81 Perry Kemp; 88 Aubrey Matthews; 83 Patrick Scott; 84 Sterling Sharpe; Tight ends (TE): 80 Clint Didier; 86 Ed West	Offensive linemen (OL): 58 Mark Cannon C; 64 Steve Collier T; 60 Dave Croston T; 74 Darryl Haley T; 65 Ron Hallstrom G; 57 Rich Moran G; 75 Ken Ruettgers T; 70 Keith Uecker T; Defensive linemen (DL): 93 Robert Brown DE; 76 Alphonso Carreker DE; 79 Bob Nelson NT; 96 Shawn Patterson DE; 68 Blaise Winter NT	Linebackers (LB): 59 John Anderson OLB; 56 Burnell Dent ILB; 99 John Dorsey ILB; 97 Tim Harris OLB; 50 Johnny Holland ILB; 91 Brian Noble ILB; 54 Scott Stephen OLB; 52 Mike Weddington OLB; Defensive backs (DB): 32 Dave Brown CB; 26 Chuck Cecil FS; 23 Tiger Greene SS; 22 Mark Lee CB; 44 Chris Mandeville FS; 37 Mark Murphy SS; 28 Ron Pitts CB; Special teams (ST): 17 Don Bracken P; 5 Curtis Burrow K; 62 Kani Kauahi LS	Practice squad None; Reserve: 47 J.R. Ambrose WR (IR); 31 Joe Armentrout RB (IR); 61 Jerry Boyarsky NT (IR); 85 Phil Epps WR (IR); 89 Joey Hackett TE (IR); 38 Norman Jefferson CB (IR); 39 Kenneth Johnson CB (IR); 46 Gary Richard CB (IR); 77 Tommy Robison G (IR); 87 Walter Stanley WR (IR); 29 Ken Stills S (IR); 73 Alan Veingrad LT (IR); 16 Randy Wright QB (IR); 47 active, 14 inactive Rookies in italics

== Regular season ==
=== Schedule ===
Week	Date	Opponent	Result	Record	Venue	Attendance
1	September 4	Los Angeles Rams	**L** 7–34	0–1	Lambeau Field	53,769
2	September 11	**Tampa Bay Buccaneers**	**L** 10–13	0–2	Lambeau Field	52,584
3	September 18	at Miami Dolphins	**L** 17–24	0–3	Joe Robbie Stadium	54,409
4	September 25	**Chicago Bears**	**L** 6–24	0–4	Lambeau Field	56,492
5	October 2	at **Tampa Bay Buccaneers**	**L** 24–27	0–5	Tampa Stadium	40,003
6	October 9	New England Patriots	**W** 45–3	1–5	Milwaukee County Stadium	51,932
7	October 16	at **Minnesota Vikings**	**W** 34–14	2–5	Hubert H. Humphrey Metrodome	59,053
8	October 23	Washington Redskins	**L** 17–20	2–6	Milwaukee County Stadium	51,767
9	October 30	at Buffalo Bills	**L** 0–28	2–7	Rich Stadium	79,176
10	November 6	at Atlanta Falcons	**L** 0–20	2–8	Atlanta–Fulton County Stadium	29,952
11	November 13	Indianapolis Colts	**L** 13–20	2–9	Lambeau Field	53,492
12	November 20	**Detroit Lions**	**L** 9–19	2–10	Milwaukee County Stadium	44,327
13	November 27	at **Chicago Bears**	**L** 0–16	2–11	Soldier Field	62,026
14	December 4	at **Detroit Lions**	**L** 14–30	2–12	Pontiac Silverdome	28,124
15	December 11	**Minnesota Vikings**	**W** 18–6	3–12	Lambeau Field	48,892
16	December 18	at Phoenix Cardinals	**W** 26–17	4–12	Sun Devil Stadium	44,586

Note: Intra-division opponents are in bold text.

=== Game summaries ===
==== Week 1: vs. Los Angeles Rams ====
Week One: Los Angeles Rams at Green Bay Packers – Game summary

Quarter	1	2	3	4	Total
**Rams**	7	14	10	3	**34**
Packers	0	0	0	7	**7**

at Lambeau Field, Green Bay, Wisconsin

- Date: September 4
- Game time: 12:00 PM CDT/1:00 PM EDT
- Referee: Dick Hantak
- TV announcers (CBS): Steve Zabriskie and Terry Bradshaw

Game information
**First quarter**
- LA – Greg Bell 1 yd. TD run XP good (LA 7–0)

**Second quarter**

- LA – Greg Bell 3 yd. TD pass from Jim Everett XP good (LA 14–0)
- LA – Henry Ellard 11 yd TD pass from Jim Everett XP good (LA 21–0)

**Third quarter**

- LA – Mike Lansford 33 yd. field goal (LA 24–0)
- LA – Jerry Gray 47 yd INT return for TD XP good (LA 31–0)

**Fourth quarter**

- GB – Ed West 17 yd. TD pass from Don Majkowski XP good (LA 31–7)
- LA – Mike Lansford 29 yd. field goal (LA 34–7)

==== Week 2: vs. Tampa Bay Buccaneers ====
Week Two: Tampa Bay Buccaneers at Green Bay Packers – Game summary

Quarter	1	2	3	4	Total
**Buccaneers**	0	10	0	3	**13**
Packers	10	0	0	0	**10**

at Lambeau Field, Green Bay, Wisconsin

- Date: September 11
- Game time: 12:00 PM CDT
- Referee: Jerry Seeman
- TV announcers (CBS): Dick Stockton and Dan Fouts

==== Week 3: at Miami Dolphins ====
Week Three: Green Bay Packers at Miami Dolphins – Game summary

Quarter	1	2	3	4	Total
Packers	0	14	3	0	**17**
**Dolphins**	17	7	0	0	**24**

at Joe Robbie Stadium, Miami, Florida

- Date: September 18
- Game time: 1:00 PM EDT/12:00 PM CDT
- Referee: Gordon McCarter
- TV announcers (CBS): Steve Zabriskie and Will McDonough

Game information
**First quarter**
- MIA – Fuad Reveiz 29-yard field goal (MIA 3–0)
- MIA – Lorenzo Hampton 2 yd. TD run, Fuad Reveiz, XP good (MIA 10–0)
- MIA – Mark Clayton 25 yd. TD pass from Dan Marino, XP good (MIA 17–0)

**Second quarter**

- GB Randy Wright 1 yd. TD run, Max Zendejas kick (MIA 17–7)
- MIA Ferrell Edmunds 4 yd TD pass from Dan Marino, XP good (MIA 24–7)
- GB Brent Fullwood 1 yd. TD run, XP good (MIA 24–14)
- GB Max Zendejas 36 yard field goal (MIA 24–17)

==== Week 4: vs. Chicago Bears ====
Week Four: Chicago Bears at Green Bay Packers – Game summary

Quarter	1	2	3	4	Total
**Bears**	0	17	0	7	**24**
Packers	6	0	0	0	**6**

at Lambeau Field, Green Bay, Wisconsin

- Date: September 25
- Game time: 12:00 PM
- Referee: Tom Dooley
- TV announcers (CBS): Tim Ryan and Dan Jiggetts

Game information
**First quarter**
- GB – Brent Fullwood 2 yd TD run (kick failed) (GB 6–0)

**Second quarter**

- CHI – Neal Anderson 45 yd TD run (Kevin Butler PAT) (CHI 7–6)
- CHI – Neal Anderson 4 yd TD run XP good (CHI 14–6)
- CHI – Kevin Butler 35 yd FG (CHI 17–6)

**Third quarter**

**Fourth Quarter**

- Thomas Sanders 5 yd. TD XP good (CHI 24–6)

==== Week 5: at Tampa Bay Buccaneers ====
Week Five: Green Bay Packers at Tampa Bay Buccaneers – Game summary

Quarter	1	2	3	4	Total
Packers	3	7	7	7	**24**
**Buccaneers**	0	10	0	17	**27**

at Tampa Stadium, Tampa, Florida

- Date: October 2
- Game time: 1:00 PM EDT
- Referee: Fred Wyant
- TV announcers (CBS): Greg Gumbel and Ken Stabler

Game information
**First quarter**
- GB – Max Zendejas 44 yd field goal (GB 3–0)

**Second quarter**

- TB – Donald Igwebuike 45 yd field goal (GB 3–3)
- TB – Kevin Murphy 35 INT return for TD XP good (TB 10–3)
- GB – Ed West 14 yd TD pass from Randy Wright XP good (TB 10–10)

**Third quarter**

- GB – Brent Fullwood 1 yd TD run XP good (GB 17–10)

**Fourth quarter**

- TB – Lars Tate 1 yd TD run XP good (GB 17–17)
- GB – Randy Wright 1 yd TD run XP good (GB 24–17)
- TB – Bruce Hill 19 yd TD pass from Vinny Testaverde XP good (GB 24–24)
- TB – Donald Igwebuike 44 yard field goal (TB 27–24)

==== Week 7: at Minnesota Vikings ====
Week Seven: Green Bay Packers at Minnesota Vikings – Game Summary

Quarter	1	2	3	4	Total
**Packers**	9	7	8	10	**34**
Vikings	0	7	0	7	**14**

at Metrodome, Minneapolis, Minnesota

- Date: October 16
- Referee: Ben Dreith
- TV announcers (CBS): James Brown and Gary Fencik

==== Week 8: vs. Washington Redskins ====
Week Eight: Washington Redskins at Green Bay Packers – Game summary

Quarter	1	2	3	4	Total
**Redskins**	10	0	7	3	**20**
Packers	7	3	7	0	**17**

at Milwaukee County Stadium, Milwaukee, Wisconsin

- Date: October 23
- Referee: Red Cashion
- TV announcers (CBS): Dick Stockton and Dan Fouts

==== Week 9: at Buffalo Bills ====
Week Nine: Green Bay Packers at Buffalo Bills – Game summary

Quarter	1	2	3	4	Total
Packers	0	0	0	0	**0**
**Bills**	7	7	7	7	**28**

at Rich Stadium, Buffalo, New York

- Date: October 30
- Game time: 1:00 PM EDT
- Referee: Gene Barth
- TV announcers (CBS): Greg Gumbel and Ken Stabler

==== Week 10: at Atlanta Falcons ====
Week 10: Green Bay Packers at Atlanta Falcons – Game summary

Quarter	1	2	3	4	Total
Packers	0	0	0	0	**0**
**Falcons**	7	10	0	3	**20**

at Atlanta–Fulton County Stadium

- Date: November 6
- Game time: 1:00 PM ET
- Referee: Fred Wyant
- TV announcers (CBS): James Brown and Gary Fencik

==== Week 12: vs. Detroit Lions ====
Week 12: Detroit Lions at Green Bay Packers – Game summary

Quarter	1	2	3	4	Total
**Lions**	3	6	0	10	**19**
Packers	0	0	3	6	**9**

at Milwaukee County Stadium, Milwaukee, Wisconsin

- Date: November 20
- Game time: 1:00 PM EDT
- Referee: Fred Silva
- TV announcers (CBS): James Brown and Gary Fencik

==== Week 13: at Chicago Bears ====
Week 13: Green Bay Packers at Chicago Bears – Game summary

Quarter	1	2	3	4	Total
Packers	0	0	0	0	**0**
**Bears'**	7	0	7	2	**16**

at Soldier Field, Chicago

- Date: November 27
- Game time: 12:00 PM CDT
- Referee: Pat Haggerty
- TV announcers (CBS): Pat Summerall and John Madden

==== Week 14: at Detroit Lions ====
Week 14: Green Bay Packers at Detroit Lions – Game summary

Quarter	1	2	3	4	Total
Packers	0	0	0	14	**14**
**Lions**	10	17	0	3	**30**

at Pontiac Silverdome in Pontiac, Michigan

- Date: December 4
- Game time: 1:00 ETD
- Referee: Red Cashion
- TV announcers (CBS): Steve Zabriskie and Gary Fencik

==== Week 15: vs. Minnesota Vikings ====
Week 15: Minnesota Vikings at Green Bay Packers – Game summary

Quarter	1	2	3	4	Total
Vikings	0	3	0	3	**6**
**Packers**	7	3	6	2	**18**

at Lambeau Field in Green Bay, Wisconsin

- Date: December 11
- Referee: Bob McElwee
- TV announcers (CBS): Steve Zabriskie and Ken Stabler

==== Week 16: at Phoenix Cardinals ====
Week 16: Green Bay Packers at Phoenix Cardinals – Game summary

Quarter	1	2	3	4	Total
**Packers**	13	7	6	0	**26**
Cardinals	7	10	0	0	**17**

at Sun Devil Stadium, Phoenix, Arizona

- Date: December 18
- Game time: 2:00 PM
- Referee: Jerry Markbreit
- TV announcers (CBS): Tim Ryan and Dan Jiggetts

=== Standings ===
NFC Central
	W	L	T	PCT	DIV	CONF	PF	PA	STK
Chicago Bears^{(1)}	12	4	0	.750	6–2	9–3	312	215	L1
Minnesota Vikings^{(4)}	11	5	0	.688	6–2	9–3	406	233	W1
Tampa Bay Buccaneers	5	11	0	.313	4–4	4–8	261	350	W1
Detroit Lions	4	12	0	.250	2–6	3–11	220	315	L2
Green Bay Packers	4	12	0	.250	2–6	3–9	240	313	W2
