= Sterling Sharpe =

American football player (born 1965)

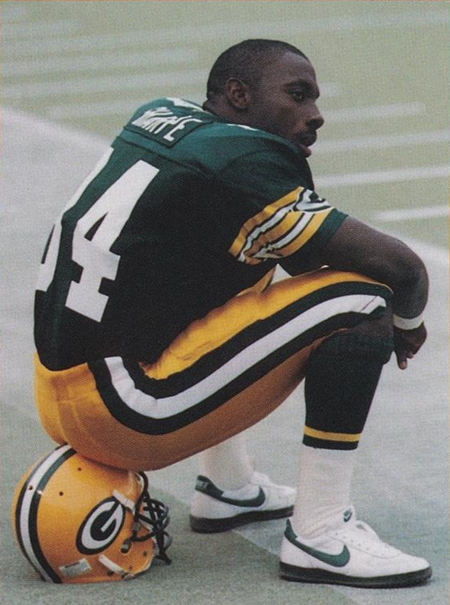

No. 84
- Position: Wide receiver

Personal information
- Born: April 6, 1965 (age 61); Chicago, Illinois, U.S.
- Listed height: 6 ft 0 in (1.83 m)
- Listed weight: 207 lb (94 kg)

Career information
- High school: Glennville (Glennville, Georgia)
- College: South Carolina (1983–1987)
- NFL draft: 1988: 1st round, 7th overall pick

Career history
- Green Bay Packers (1988–1994)

Awards and highlights
- 3× First-team All-Pro (1989, 1992, 1993); 5× Pro Bowl (1989, 1990, 1992–1994); 3× NFL receptions leader (1989, 1992, 1993); NFL receiving yards leader (1992); 2× NFL receiving touchdowns leader (1992, 1994); Green Bay Packers Hall of Fame; First-team All-America (1987); Third-team All-America (1986); South Carolina Gamecocks No. 2 retired

Career NFL statistics
- Receptions: 595
- Receiving yards: 8,134
- Receiving touchdowns: 65
- Stats at Pro Football Reference
- Pro Football Hall of Fame
- College Football Hall of Fame

Sterling Sharpe (born April 6, 1965) is an American former professional football player who was a wide receiver for the Green Bay Packers of the National Football League (NFL). He played college football for the South Carolina Gamecocks, and played in the NFL from 1988 to 1994 with the Packers in a career shortened by a neck injury. He became an analyst for the NFL Network. He is the older brother of Pro Football Hall of Fame tight end Shannon Sharpe. In 2025, Sterling Sharpe was inducted into the Pro Football Hall of Fame.

== Early life and college ==
Sharpe was born in Chicago to Pete Sharpe and Mary Alice Dixon. Growing up, Sharpe lived in Glennville, Georgia, with his grandparents and siblings, including his younger brother, Hall of Fame tight end Shannon Sharpe. He graduated Glennville High School, playing running back, quarterback and linebacker and was a member of the basketball and track teams.

As a wide receiver at the University of South Carolina, Sharpe set school records with 169 career receptions and 2,497 receiving yards and a since-broken record of 17 career touchdowns. He also set the school record for single-season receiving touchdowns with 11, which was broken in 2005 by Sidney Rice. Sharpe's No. 2 jersey was retired by South Carolina at the end of the 1987 regular season, making him the second Gamecock to be granted this honor while still playing. His college coach and mentor, William "Tank" Black, left the Gamecocks to become a player-manager and represented Sharpe throughout his professional career. Sharpe was inducted into the College Football Hall of Fame in 2014.

== Professional career ==
Pre-draft measurables
Height	Weight	Hand span
5 ft 11 1/2 in (1.82 m)	202 lb (92 kg)	9 1/2 in (0.24 m)

Sharpe was the first round, seventh overall, draft pick by the Packers in 1988 and had an immediate impact on the team. In his rookie season, he started all sixteen games and caught 55 passes. His sophomore season he led the league with 90 receptions, the first Packer to do so since Don Hutson in 1945, and broke Hutson's records for receptions and receiving yards in a season. Sharpe was known as a tough receiver with strong hands, who was willing to go over the middle to make difficult catches in traffic.

A few years later, in 1992, Sharpe and the new quarterback, Brett Favre, teamed up to become one of the top passing tandems in the league. In the final game of that season, Sterling and Favre hooked up for Sharpe's 107th reception of the season which broke the NFL's single-season receptions record, set by Art Monk in 1984. That season, he became one of only nine players in NFL history to win the outright "Triple Crown" at the receiver position: leading the league in receiving yards, receiving touchdowns, and receptions. Ray Flaherty (1932), Don Hutson (1936, 1941–44), Elroy Hirsch (1951), Pete Pihos (1953), and Raymond Berry (1959) achieved this in the years before the Super Bowl era. The only other players to accomplish this feat are Jerry Rice (1990), Steve Smith Sr. (2005), Cooper Kupp (2021), and Ja’Marr Chase (2024).

In the 1993 season he broke his own record, with 112 receptions, which also made him the first player to have consecutive seasons catching more than 100 passes. In 1994, his 18 touchdown receptions were the second-most in league history at the time, behind Jerry Rice's 22 in 1987. On October 24, 1993, he became the second Packer in team history to catch four touchdown passes in one game since Don Hutson in 1945.

Sharpe's tenure at wide receiver was cut short by a neck injury. Near the end of the 1994 season, it was found that he had a neck abnormality that needed surgery, as he had looseness in the top two vertebrae in his neck. He had stinger injuries against Atlanta and Tampa Bay.

He had the surgery and never returned to football. It ended a career in which he was invited to the Pro Bowl five times (1989, 1990, 1992, 1993, and 1994). Since he was unable to continue playing and was not on the Packers team that won the Super Bowl in 1996, his younger brother Shannon gave him the first of the three Super Bowl rings he won, citing him as a major influence in his life by saying:

The two people who influenced me the most, good or bad, are Sterling and my grandmother. Everything I know about being a man, about football, everything I know about sports, pretty much in life, is because of those two people.

In the span of his seven seasons in the League, he was second in receptions and receiving yards and third in touchdowns (with Jerry Rice ahead of him in each category). His brother Shannon stated during his Hall of Fame induction ceremony, "I am the only person in the Hall of Fame that can say I was the second-best player in my own family." In 2002, he was inducted into the Green Bay Packers Hall of Fame.

After his retirement from the NFL, Sharpe became an analyst for ESPN and then the NFL Network.

In 2024, he was named as a Seniors finalist for the Pro Football Hall of Fame. On February 6, 2025, he was announced as an inductee for the 2025 class. He was inducted on August 2, 2025. His induction made Sterling and Shannon Sharpe the first brothers in the Pro Football Hall of Fame.

== NFL career statistics ==
Legend
	Led the league
**Bold**	Career high

=== Regular season ===
Year	Team	Games		Receiving					Rushing					Fum
Year	Team	GP	GS	Rec	Yds	Avg	Lng	TD	Att	Yds	Avg	Lng	TD	Fum
1988	GB	16	16	55	791	14.4	51	1	**4**	-2	-0.5	5	0	**3**
1989	GB	16	16	90	1,423	15.8	**79**	12	2	**25**	**12.5**	**26**	0	1
1990	GB	16	16	67	1,105	**16.5**	76	6	2	14	7.0	10	0	0
1991	GB	16	16	69	961	13.9	58	4	**4**	4	1.0	12	0	1
1992	GB	16	16	108	**1,461**	13.5	76	13	**4**	8	2.0	14	0	2
1993	GB	16	16	**112**	1,274	11.4	54	11	**4**	8	2.0	5	0	1
1994	GB	16	16	94	1,119	11.9	49	**18**	3	15	5.0	8	0	1
Career		112	112	595	8,134	13.7	79	65	23	72	3.1	26	0	9

=== Postseason ===
Year	Team	Games		Receiving					Rushing					Fum
Year	Team	GP	GS	Rec	Yds	Avg	Lng	TD	Att	Yds	Avg	Lng	TD	Fum
1993	GB	2	2	11	229	20.8	48	4	0	0	—	0	0	0
Career		2	2	11	229	20.8	48	4	0	0	—	0	0	0
