= Brent Fullwood =

American football player

No. 21, 29
- Position: Running back

Personal information
- Listed height: 5 ft 11 in (1.80 m)
- Listed weight: 209 lb (95 kg)

Career information
- High school: Saint Cloud
- College: Auburn
- NFL draft: 1987: 1st round, 4th overall pick

Career history
- Green Bay Packers (1987–1990); Cleveland Browns (1990); Miami Dolphins (1991)*; Los Angeles Raiders (1992)*
- * Offseason or practice squad member only

Awards and highlights
- Pro Bowl (1989); Unanimous All-American (1986); First-team All-SEC (1986)

Career NFL statistics
- Rushing yards: 1,702
- Receiving yards: 370
- Touchdowns: 19
- Stats at Pro Football Reference

Brent Leanrd Fullwood is an American former professional football player who was a running back in the National Football League (NFL). He was selected by the Green Bay Packers in the first round (fourth overall pick) of the 1987 NFL draft after finishing sixth in 1986 Heisman Trophy voting.

Fullwood played four NFL seasons, from 1987 to 1990. His best year as a pro came during the 1989 season, when he led the Packers in rushing with 821 yards and was selected to the 1990 Pro Bowl. However Sports Illustrated listed Fullwood as one of the Packers biggest draft busts, noting a high rate of fumbles and a 1990 incident when he removed himself from a game against the Chicago Bears claiming illness, but was seen later that evening at a nightclub. After this incident the Packers traded Fullwood on October 9, 1990 to the Cleveland Browns for a 7th Round draft choice, however he only dressed for one game for the Browns who waived him 2 months after signing him. During the 1991 and 1992 offseasons he was briefly signed by the Miami Dolphins and then Los Angeles Raiders but was released by both before the regular playing season began.

== Career statistics ==
Legend
**Bold**	Career high

=== College statistics ===
Year	Team	Games	Rushing				Receiving			
Year	Team	GP	Att	Yds	Avg	TD	Rec	Yds	Avg	TD
1983	Auburn	11	14	86	6.1	1	0	0	0.0	0
1984	Auburn	12	117	628	5.4	7	3	30	**10.0**	0
1985	Auburn	11	92	684	7.4	6	1	1	1.0	0
1986	Auburn	11	**167**	**1,391**	**8.3**	**10**	**5**	**46**	9.2	0
		45	390	2,789	7.2	24	9	77	8.6	0

== NFL statistics ==
Year	Team	GP	Rushing					Receiving				
Year	Team	GP	Att	Yds	Avg	Lng	TD	Rec	Yds	Avg	Lng	TD
1987	GB	11	84	274	3.3	18	5	2	11	5.5	12	0
1988	GB	14	101	483	**4.8**	33	**7**	**20**	128	6.4	30	**1**
1989	GB	15	**204**	**821**	4.0	**38**	5	19	**214**	**11.3**	**67**	0
1990	GB	5	44	124	2.8	16	1	3	17	5.7	10	0
1990	CLE	0	0	0	0	0	0	0	0	0	0	0
Career		45	433	1,702	3.9	38	18	44	370	8.4	67	1
