= Don Majkowski =

American football player (born 1964)

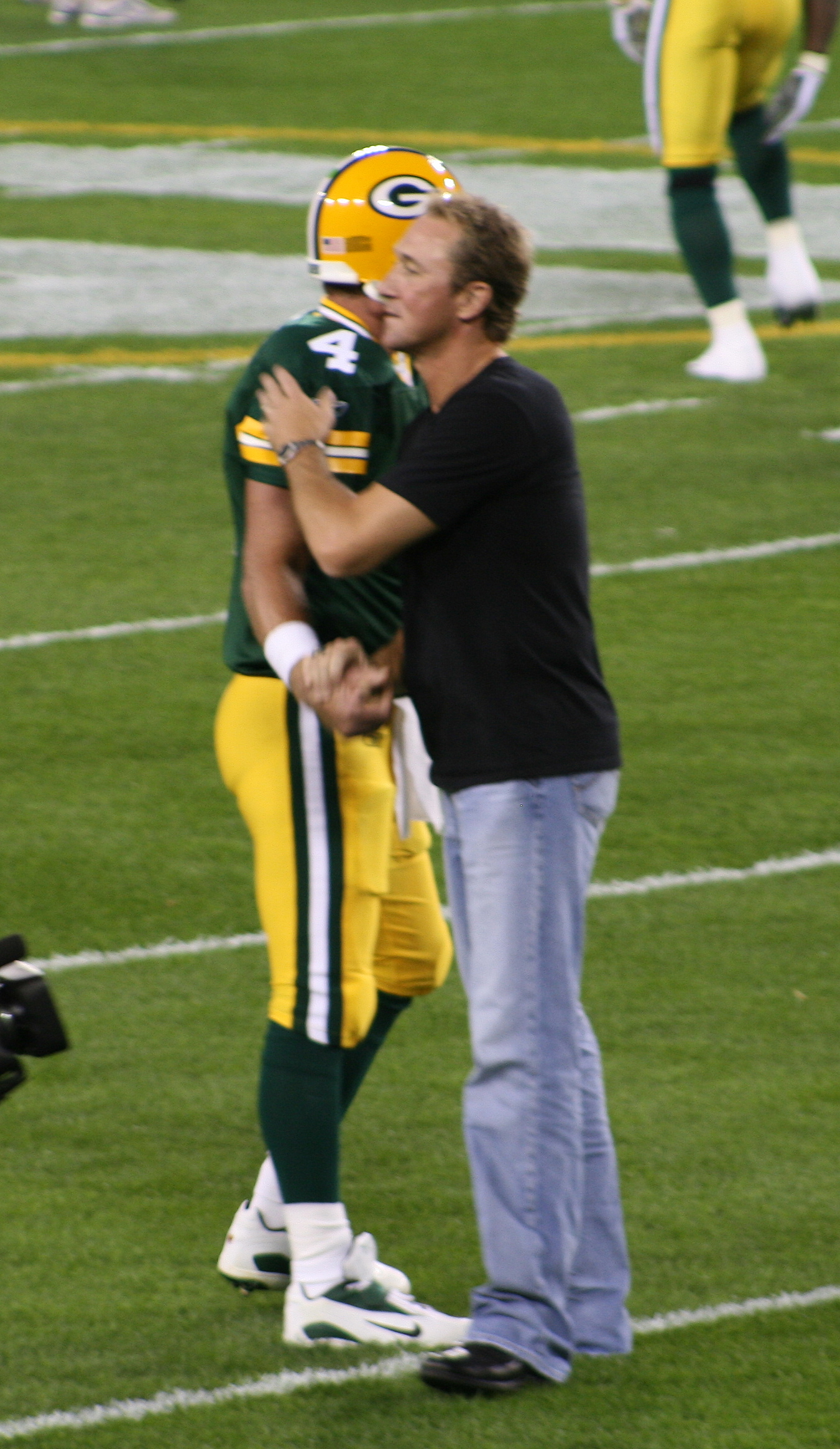
- Majkowski (right) greeting Brett Favre in 2007

No. 1, 5, 7
- Position: Quarterback

Personal information
- Born: February 25, 1964 (age 62); Buffalo, New York, U.S.
- Listed height: 6 ft 2 in (1.88 m)
- Listed weight: 208 lb (94 kg)

Career information
- High school: Depew (NY)
- College: Virginia
- NFL draft: 1987: 10th round, 255th overall pick

Career history
- Green Bay Packers (1987–1992); Indianapolis Colts (1993–1994); Detroit Lions (1995–1996)

Awards and highlights
- Second-team All-Pro (1989); Pro Bowl (1989); NFL passing yards leader (1989); Green Bay Packers Hall of Fame

Career NFL statistics
- Passing attempts: 1,905
- Passing completions: 1,056
- Completion percentage: 55.4%
- TD–INT: 66–67
- Passing yards: 12,700
- Passer rating: 72.9
- Rushing yards: 1,114
- Rushing touchdowns: 12
- Stats at Pro Football Reference

Donald "Majik" Vincent Majkowski (born February 25, 1964) is an American former professional football player who was a quarterback in the National Football League (NFL) for the Green Bay Packers, Indianapolis Colts, and Detroit Lions. He played college football for the Virginia Cavaliers.

== College career ==
Following graduation from the Fork Union Military Academy in central Virginia, Majkowski played college football at the University of Virginia in nearby Charlottesville. He became the starting quarterback for the Cavaliers partway into the 1983 season, his first year there. The next year, Majkowski led the Cavaliers to the school's first ever bowl appearance and bowl win, in the Peach Bowl. During his college career, Majkowski wore jersey number one.

== Professional career ==
Pre-draft measurables
Height	Weight	Arm length	Hand span	40-yard dash	10-yard split	20-yard split	20-yard shuttle	Vertical jump	Wonderlic
6 ft 1 1/2 in (1.87 m)	199 lb (90 kg)	32 1/4 in (0.82 m)	9 in (0.23 m)	4.83 s	1.62 s	2.80 s	4.13 s	34.0 in (0.86 m)	21
All values from NFL Combine

=== Green Bay Packers ===
Majkowski was selected by the Green Bay Packers in the tenth round of the 1987 NFL draft. He was originally issued jersey #5, but switched to #7 the following season in anticipation that #5 would be retired for Paul Hornung. The jersey was never officially retired. As a rookie in 1987, he split time with Randy Wright, with whom he also shared quarterback duties in 1988. During the 1987 season Majkowski's salary was $65,000; he also received a $10,000 roster bonus.

Nicknamed "The Majik Man", Majkowski broke out during the 1989 season. He was given the starting job and Randy Wright was released. Majkowski had one of the finest seasons in Packers history, with 353 completed passes in 599 attempts. He also threw for 27 touchdowns, and his 4,318 passing yards led the NFL. Notably, the Packers won their first game against the hated rival Chicago Bears since 1984. The key was a touchdown play, first nullified by an illegal forward pass by Majkowski, then upheld by instant replay as a legal pass. The season ended with 10 wins and 6 losses; Majkowski capped the season with being selected to the Pro Bowl.

Majkowski signed a new one-year contract for over $1.5 million in September 1990, but his success was cut short in the tenth game of the season. He was injured when he was upended and tackled on his shoulder by Freddie Joe Nunn of the Phoenix Cardinals, who drew a personal foul on the play. At first thought to be a bruise, Majkowski's injury turned out to be more serious, a torn rotator cuff. The Packers finished the season with backups Anthony Dilweg and Blair Kiel. During the 1991 season, Majkowski was benched by head coach Lindy Infante and replaced by Mike Tomczak as starter, but resumed starting duties at the beginning of 1992. On a play on September 20 against the Cincinnati Bengals, Majkowski tore a ligament in his ankle in the first quarter. He was replaced by 22-year-old Brett Favre, who completed the game, a one-point victory, and went on to start every Packers game through 2007. In 2005, Majkowski was inducted into the Green Bay Packers Hall of Fame.

=== Indianapolis Colts ===
After the Packers elected to keep Brett Favre as their starting quarterback and bench Majkowski, he decided to leave Green Bay after the 1992 season and signed with the Indianapolis Colts as a backup for two seasons.

=== Detroit Lions ===
Majkowski finished his football career with the Detroit Lions in 1995 and 1996 as a backup to starter Scott Mitchell. In his final season in 1996, Majkowski faced Favre and the Green Bay Packers on November 3, completing 15 of 32 passes for 153 yards, a touchdown and no interceptions in a 28–18 loss. He was also sacked five times. Majkowski's final career start was two weeks later against the Seattle Seahawks at the Pontiac Silverdome. He went 18 for 23 (78% completion percentage) for 157 yards, one TD and one interception for a passer rating of 91.5. The Lions won the game, 17–16, and improved their record to 5–6. However, this was the Lions' last win of the season; Mitchell started the remaining five games, which the Lions lost to finish 5–11.

== NFL career statistics ==
Legend
	Led the league
**Bold**	Career high

=== Regular season ===
Year	Team	Games			Passing									Rushing					Sacks	
Year	Team	GP	GS	Record	Cmp	Att	Pct	Yds	Y/A	Lng	TD	Int	Rtg	Att	Yds	Avg	Lng	TD	Sck	Yds
1987	GB	7	5	2-2-1	55	127	43.3	875	6.9	70	5	3	70.2	15	127	**8.5**	**33**	0	10	77
1988	GB	13	9	3-6	178	336	53.0	2,119	6.3	56	9	11	67.8	47	225	4.8	24	1	31	176
1989	GB	**16**	**16**	**10-6**	**353**	**599**	58.9	**4,318**	7.2	**79**	**27**	**20**	82.3	**75**	**358**	4.8	20	**5**	**47**	**268**
1990	GB	9	8	4-4	150	264	56.8	1,925	7.3	76	10	12	73.5	29	186	6.4	24	1	32	178
1991	GB	9	8	2-6	115	226	50.9	1,362	6.0	39	3	8	59.3	25	108	4.3	15	2	30	152
1992	GB	14	3	1-2	38	55	69.1	271	4.9	32	2	2	77.2	8	33	4.1	8	0	9	60
1993	IND	3	0	0-0	13	24	54.2	105	4.4	17	0	1	48.1	2	4	2.0	4	0	1	5
1994	IND	9	6	3-3	84	152	55.3	1,010	6.6	29	6	7	69.8	24	34	1.4	10	3	9	76
1995	DET	5	0	0-0	15	20	**75.0**	161	**8.1**	22	1	0	**114.8**	9	1	0.1	4	0	1	5
1996	DET	5	2	1-1	55	102	53.9	554	5.4	27	3	3	67.2	14	38	2.7	12	0	10	61
Career		90	57	26-30-1	1,056	1,905	55.4	12,700	6.7	79	66	67	72.9	248	1,114	4.5	33	12	180	1,058

=== Playoffs ===
Year	Team	Games			Passing									Rushing					Sacks	
Year	Team	GP	GS	Record	Cmp	Att	Pct	Yds	Y/A	Lng	TD	Int	Rtg	Att	Yds	Avg	Lng	TD	Sck	Yds
1995	DET	1	0	0-0	14	23	60.9	206	9.0	68	3	2	93.5	3	16	5.3	8	0	0	0
Career		1	0	0-0	14	23	60.9	206	9.0	68	3	2	93.5	3	16	5.3	8	0	0	0

== Personal life ==
Majkowski lived in Johns Creek, Georgia with his family. He previously ran a real estate investment company, but sold it due to being unable to keep up with its demands because of a string of serious health issues related to his playing career. His son Bo played baseball at Clemson University.

In 2020, Majkowski and Aveion Cason filed a lawsuit against the NFL and the NFLPA over cuts made to their disability payments. It was dismissed in 2021 by U.S. District Court Judge Trevor N. McFadden.

In 2025, Majkowski was involved in an altercation in an Eau Claire bar, in which he grabbed the throat of an employee of the bar. He was cited for disorderly conduct and fined $213.
