= 1990 Pro Bowl =

National Football League all-star game

1990 NFL Pro Bowl
NFC	AFC
27	21
Head coach: John Robinson (Los Angeles Rams)	Head coach: Bud Carson (Cleveland Browns)
	1	2	3	4	Total
NFC	3	3	21	0	27
AFC	0	7	0	14	21
- Date: February 4, 1990
- Stadium: Aloha Stadium; Honolulu, Hawaii
- MVP: Jerry Gray (Los Angeles Rams)
- Referee: Johnny Grier
- Attendance: 50,445

TV in the United States
- Network: ESPN
- Announcers: Mike Patrick, Joe Theismann & Chris Berman

The 1990 Pro Bowl was the NFL's fortieth annual all-star game which featured the outstanding performers from the 1989 season. The game was played on Sunday, February 4, 1990, at Aloha Stadium in Honolulu, Hawaii before a crowd of 50,445. The final score was NFC 27, AFC 21.

Bud Carson of the Cleveland Browns led the AFC team against an NFC team coached by Los Angeles Rams head coach John Robinson. The referee was Johnny Grier.

Jerry Gray of the Los Angeles Rams was named the game's MVP. Players on the winning NFC team received $10,000 apiece while the AFC participants each took home $5,000.

== AFC roster ==
=== Offense ===
Position	Starter(s)	Reserve(s)
Quarterback	7 Boomer Esiason, Cincinnati	7 John Elway, Denver; 1 Warren Moon, Houston; 17 Dave Krieg, Seattle
Running back	34 Thurman Thomas, Buffalo	29 Eric Dickerson, Indianapolis; 21 James Brooks, Cincinnati
Fullback	35 Christian Okoye, Kansas City	
Wide receiver	83 Andre Reed, Buffalo; 83 Anthony Miller, San Diego	84 Webster Slaughter, Cleveland; 89 Brian Blades, Seattle
Tight end	82 Rodney Holman, Cincinnati	80 Ferrell Edmunds, Miami
Offensive tackle	78 Anthony Muñoz, Cincinnati; 75 Chris Hinton, Indianapolis	62 Tunch Ilkin, Pittsburgh
Offensive guard	63 Mike Munchak, Houston; 74 Bruce Matthews, Houston	65 Max Montoya, Cincinnati
Center	67 Kent Hull, Buffalo	53 Ray Donaldson, Indianapolis

=== Defense ===
Position	Starter(s)	Reserve(s)
Defensive end	99 Lee Williams, San Diego; 78 Bruce Smith, Buffalo	75 Howie Long, L. A. Raiders
Defensive tackle	92 Michael Dean Perry, Cleveland	71 Greg Kragen, Denver
Outside linebacker	91 Leslie O'Neal, San Diego; 58 Derrick Thomas, Kansas City	97 Rufus Porter, Seattle; 52 Johnny Rembert, New England
Inside linebacker	77 Karl Mecklenburg, Denver; 59 Mike Johnson, Cleveland	58 Shane Conlan, Buffalo; 56 John Offerdahl, Miami; 57 Clay Matthews, Cleveland
Cornerback	29 Albert Lewis, Kansas City; 31 Frank Minnifield, Cleveland	31 Kevin Ross, Kansas City
Free safety	22 Erik McMillan, N. Y. Jets	
Strong safety	33 David Fulcher, Cincinnati	49 Dennis Smith, Denver

=== Special teams ===
Position	Starter(s)	Reserve(s)
Punter	4 Reggie Roby, Miami	
Placekicker	9 David Treadwell, Denver	
Kick returner	26 Rod Woodson, Pittsburgh	

== NFC roster ==
=== Offense ===
Position	Starter(s)	Reserve(s)
Quarterback	16 Joe Montana, San Francisco	7 Don Majkowski, Green Bay; 11 Mark Rypien, Washington; 12 Randall Cunningham, Philadelphia
Running back	20 Barry Sanders, Detroit	35 Neal Anderson, Chicago; 21 Dalton Hilliard, New Orleans; 33 Roger Craig, San Francisco
Fullback	21 Brent Fullwood, Green Bay	
Wide receiver	80 Jerry Rice, San Francisco; 84 Sterling Sharpe, Green Bay	82 John Taylor, San Francisco; 89 Mark Carrier, Tampa Bay; 80 Henry Ellard, L. A. Rams; 81 Anthony Carter, Minnesota
Tight end	88 Keith Jackson, Philadelphia	83 Steve Jordan, Minnesota
Offensive tackle	78 Jackie Slater, L. A. Rams; 65 Gary Zimmerman, Minnesota	67 Luis Sharpe, Phoenix
Offensive guard	66 Tom Newberry, L. A. Rams; 64 Randall McDaniel, Minnesota	79 Bill Fralic, Atlanta; 62 Guy McIntyre, San Francisco
Center	63 Jay Hilgenberg, Chicago	56 Doug Smith, L. A. Rams

=== Defense ===
Position	Starter(s)	Reserve(s)
Defensive end	56 Chris Doleman, Minnesota; 92 Reggie White, Philadelphia	71 Charles Mann, Washington
Defensive tackle	75 Keith Millard, Minnesota	93 Jerry Ball, Detroit
Outside linebacker	56 Lawrence Taylor, N. Y. Giants; 97 Tim Harris, Green Bay	91 Kevin Greene, L. A. Rams; 56 Pat Swilling, New Orleans
Inside linebacker	50 Mike Singletary, Chicago; 53 Vaughan Johnson, New Orleans	54 Chris Spielman, Detroit
Cornerback	21 Eric Allen, Philadelphia; 23 Jerry Gray, L. A. Rams	39 Carl Lee, Minnesota
Free safety	42 Ronnie Lott, San Francisco	
Strong safety	46 Tim McDonald, Phoenix	47 Joey Browner, Minnesota

=== Special teams ===
Position	Starter(s)	Reserve(s)
Punter	3 Rich Camarillo, Phoenix	
Placekicker	3 Eddie Murray, Detroit	
Kick returner	30 David Meggett, N. Y. Giants	
