= Mark Hall (defensive end) =

American football player (born 1965)

No. 72, 70
- Position: Defensive end

Personal information
- Born: August 21, 1965; Morgan City, Louisiana, U.S.
- Listed height: 6 ft 4 in (1.93 m)
- Listed weight: 285 lb (129 kg)

Career information
- High school: Patterson (LA)
- College: Mississippi Gulf Coast; LSU; Louisiana
- NFL draft: 1989: 7th round, 169th overall pick

Career history
- Green Bay Packers (1989–1990); Miami Dolphins (1992)*; Hamilton Tiger-Cats (1992)
- * Offseason or practice squad member only

Career NFL statistics
- Sacks: 1
- Stats at Pro Football Reference

Mark Hall (born August 21, 1965) is an American former professional football player who was a defensive end in the National Football League (NFL) and Canadian Football League (CFL). He played college football for the LSU Tigers and Louisiana Ragin' Cajuns.

== Early life ==
Hall was born in Morgan City, Louisiana.

== Career ==
Hall was selected by the Green Bay Packers in the seventh round of the 1989 NFL draft and spent two seasons with the team. He played at the college level at the University of Southwestern Louisiana and Louisiana State University.
