= Chris Jacke =

American football player (born 1966)

No. 13
- Position: Placekicker

Personal information
- Born: March 12, 1966 (age 60); Richmond, Virginia, U.S.
- Listed height: 6 ft 0 in (1.83 m)
- Listed weight: 207 lb (94 kg)

Career information
- High school: J. J. Pearce (Richardson, Texas)
- College: UTEP
- NFL draft: 1989: 6th round, 142nd overall pick

Career history
- Green Bay Packers (1989–1996); Pittsburgh Steelers (1997); Washington Redskins (1997); Arizona Cardinals (1998–1999)

Awards and highlights
- Super Bowl champion (XXXI); First-team All-Pro (1993); PFWA All-Rookie Team (1989); Green Bay Packers Hall of Fame; First-team All-American (1988); First-team All-WAC (1988)

Career NFL statistics
- Field goals made: 202
- Field goals attempted: 265
- Field goal %: 76.2
- Longest field goal: 54
- Stats at Pro Football Reference

Christopher Lee Jacke (born March 12, 1966) is an American former professional football player who was a placekicker in the National Football League (NFL), primarily for the Green Bay Packers. He was a first-team All-Pro in 1993 and was inducted into the Green Bay Packers Hall of Fame in 2013.

Before his NFL career, Jacke played college football for the UTEP Miners. He was selected 142nd overall by Packers in the sixth round of the 1989 NFL draft. He went on to play eight seasons with Green Bay from 1989 to 1996. In his last year with the Packers, he assisted them to a 13–3 record and a win in Super Bowl XXXI over the New England Patriots. In 1997, Jacke became a free agent and was signed by the Pittsburgh Steelers. During training camp he was injured and never played a game for them. Later that season he was signed by the Washington Redskins, only playing in one game. He finished his football career with the Arizona Cardinals for the 1998 and 1999 NFL seasons.

Jacke previously held a record for the longest field goal to end overtime (53 yards) and is fourth behind Mason Crosby, Ryan Longwell and Don Hutson all time for the Packers in scoring. He was inducted into the Green Bay Packers Hall of Fame in 2013.

== Personal life ==
Chris met his wife, Terri, in 2009 and they were married in 2013. They reside near Green Bay, Wisconsin. Chris has two sons from his marriage to Tracey (1992–2002).
