= Mike Weddington =

American football player (born 1960)

No. 52
- Position: Linebacker

Personal information
- Born: October 9, 1960 (age 66); Belton, Texas, U.S.
- Listed height: 6 ft 4 in (1.93 m)
- Listed weight: 245 lb (111 kg)

Career information
- High school: Temple (TX)
- College: Oklahoma
- NFL draft: 1983: undrafted

Career history
- New Jersey Generals (1983–1985); Green Bay Packers (1986–1990)
- Stats at Pro Football Reference

Mike Weddington (born October 9, 1960) is an American former professional football player who was a linebacker for five seasons for the Green Bay Packers of the National Football League (NFL). He played college football for the Oklahoma Sooners. Weddington began his pro career with three seasons for the New Jersey Generals of the United States Football League. Before attending the University of Oklahoma, he was approached by the Cincinnati Reds and Philadelphia Phillies.

Michael has two children, Porscha and Christian. Porscha, his oldest child, played college basketball at the University of Kansas. Christian currently runs track at Fordham University and is a content creator.
