= Jeff Query =

American football player (born 1967)

No. 85, 89, 16
- Position: Wide receiver

Personal information
- Born: March 7, 1967 (age 59); Forsyth, Illinois, U.S.
- Listed height: 6 ft 0 in (1.83 m)
- Listed weight: 165 lb (75 kg)

Career information
- High school: Maroa-Forsyth (Maroa, Illinois)
- College: Millikin
- NFL draft: 1989: 5th round, 124th overall pick

Career history
- Green Bay Packers (1989–1991); Houston Oilers (1992)*; Cincinnati Bengals (1992–1995); Washington Redskins (1995); Green Bay Packers (1996)*
- * Offseason or practice squad member only

Career NFL statistics
- Receptions: 141
- Receiving yards: 1,865
- Touchdowns: 11
- Stats at Pro Football Reference

Jeffrey Lee Query (born March 7, 1967) is an American former professional football player who was a wide receiver in the National Football League (NFL) for the Green Bay Packers, Cincinnati Bengals, and Washington Redskins. He played college football for the Millikin Big Blue. The Packers selected Query in the fifth round of the 1989 NFL draft with the 124th overall pick. Query also returned punts while playing for the Packers and was awarded the title of the NFL's Fastest Man in both the 1989 and 1990 seasons. A fan favorite among the Lambeau fan base, he was given a collection of nicknames from "Bleached Lightning" to "the Milliken Mullet".
