= Perry Kemp =

American football player (born 1961)

No. 85, 22, 81
- Position: Wide receiver

Personal information
- Born: December 31, 1961 (age 64); Canonsburg, Pennsylvania, U.S.
- Listed height: 5 ft 11 in (1.80 m)
- Listed weight: 163 lb (74 kg)

Career information
- High school: Fort Cherry (McDonald, Pennsylvania)
- College: California (PA)
- NFL draft: 1984: undrafted

Career history
- Jacksonville Bulls (1984-1985); Dallas Cowboys (1986)*; Cleveland Browns (1987); Green Bay Packers (1988–1991)
- * Offseason or practice squad member only

Career NFL statistics
- Receptions: 194
- Receiving yards: 2,565
- Touchdowns: 8
- Stats at Pro Football Reference

Commodore Perry Kemp (born December 31, 1961) is an American former professional football player who was a wide receiver in the National Football League (NFL) and the United States Football League (USFL). He began his professional career with the Jacksonville Bulls of the USFL. He then played for the Cleveland Browns and Green Bay Packers of the NFL.

== Early life and college ==
Kemp played college football for the California Vulcans from 1980 to 1983.

== Professional career ==
Kemp started his pro career with the Jacksonville Bulls of the USFL who were coached by Lindy Infante in 1985. He was on the Dallas Cowboys roster in the 1986 season but did not play. He then followed Infante to the Cleveland Browns in 1987, playing for the team during the 1987 NFL Players Strike. He then moved with Infante to the Green Bay Packers in 1988.

=== Statistics ===
USFL Career Stats
Jacksonville Bulls
	Rushing					Receiving					Kick returns					Misc
Year	Att	Yds	Avg	Lng	TD	Rec	Yds	Avg	Lng	TD	Att	Yds	Avg	Lng	TD	2Pt
1984	2	12	6.0	9	0	44	730	16.6	58	2	4	84	21.0	22	0	0
1985	1	-1	-1.0	1	0	59	915	15.5	43	4	15	289	19.3	28	0	1
Career	3	-11	1.6	9	0	103	1,645	15.97	58	6	19	373	19.6	28	0	1
