= Shawn Patterson (American football) =

American football player (born 1964)

No. 96
- Position: Defensive lineman

Personal information
- Born: June 13, 1964 (age 62); Oahu, Hawaii, U.S.
- Listed height: 6 ft 2 in (1.88 m)
- Listed weight: 267 lb (121 kg)

Career information
- High school: McClintock (Arizona)
- College: Arizona State
- NFL draft: 1988: 2nd round, 34th overall pick

Career history
- Green Bay Packers (1988–1993)

Awards and highlights
- First-team All-Pac-10 (1987)

Career NFL statistics
- Games played (started): 48 (13)
- Sacks: 11
- Interceptions: 1
- Stats at Pro Football Reference

Kenneth Shawn Patterson (born June 13, 1964) is an American former professional football player who was a defensive lineman for the Green Bay Packers of the National Football League (NFL). He was born in Oahu, Hawaii, and after moving to Arizona, graduated from McClintock High School. Patterson then played college football for the Arizona State Sun Devils as a "standout defensive lineman". He recorded three sacks his senior year at Arizona State University.

Patterson was selected by the Packers in the second round of the 1988 NFL draft with the 34th overall pick. He played in 48 games for the Packers over six seasons, recording 11 sacks and 1 interception. He became an immediate starter his rookie year after injuries to other Packers' players. His only interception occurred in a 1990 game against the Minnesota Vikings; he tipped the ball, caught it and then returned it for a touchdown. Patterson retired after the 1993 NFL season due to bad knees. After his football career, he became a home builder in Arizona. In 2006, Patterson, who has been a lifelong hunting enthusiast, made news for successfully shooting with a bow and arrow a record sized bull elk in Northern Arizona. Patterson's son, Kyle, played college football for the United States Air Force Academy.
