= Green Bay Packers all-time roster =

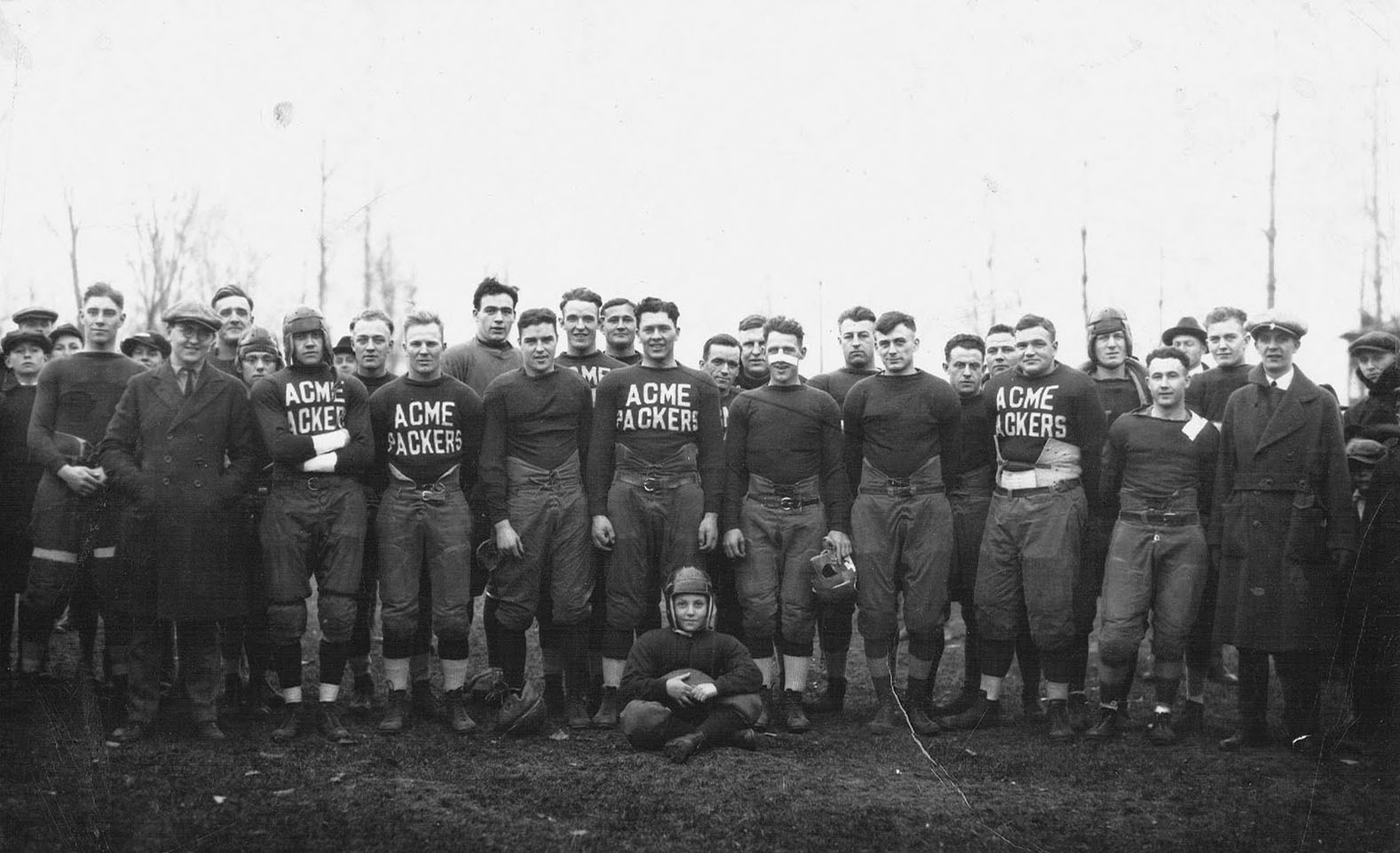
The 1921 Green Bay Packers were the first to participate in the National Football League.

The Green Bay Packers are a professional American football team based in Green Bay, Wisconsin. The Packers have competed in the National Football League (NFL) since 1921, two years after their original founding by Curly Lambeau and George Whitney Calhoun. They are members of the North Division of the National Football Conference (NFC) and play their home games at Lambeau Field in central Wisconsin. Over 1,800 players have taken part in at least one regular season or postseason game for the Packers since 1921. (Note: Packers.com includes Earl Smith on their all-time roster, but he did not play in a game for the team. As such, he is excluded from this list.) The team's all-time roster does not include players who only played in games during the 1919 or 1920 seasons (prior to the Packers' admission into the NFL). Players who only participated in preseason games or who were only signed to the practice squad are also excluded. The Packers have had 36 players inducted into the Pro Football Hall of Fame and have inducted 139 players into their own team hall of fame. Roster sizes have evolved since the early days of the NFL, growing from 18 roster spots in 1921 to the lower 50s by the 2020s. (Note: Roster size includes players who are inactive on gameday but can still stay on the active roster throughout the season.)

== Legend ==
Note: All-time roster accurate as of the end of the 2025 NFL season.

Legend
†	Inducted into the Pro Football Hall of Fame
‡	Inducted into the Green Bay Packers Hall of Fame

== A ==
1. Jared Abbrederis
2. Micah Abernathy
3. Cliff Aberson
4. Johnathan Abram
5. Nate Abrams
6. George Abramson
7. Ron Acks
8. Chet Adams
9. Davante Adams
10. Montravius Adams
11. Herb Adderley † ‡
12. Bob Adkins
13. Erik Affholter
14. Dick Afflis
15. Ben Agajanian
16. Louie Aguiar
17. Ramiz Ahmed
18. Victor Aiyewa
19. Chris Akins
20. Zac Alcorn
21. Ben Aldridge
22. Lionel Aldridge ‡
23. Jaire Alexander
24. Jake Allen
25. Kenderick Allen
26. Kurt Allerman
27. Geronimo Allison
28. Adrian Amos
29. Marty Amsler
30. Norm Amundsen
31. Abdullah Anderson
32. Aric Anderson
33. Bill Anderson
34. Donny Anderson ‡
35. John Anderson ‡
36. Marques Anderson
37. Vickey Ray Anderson
38. Zayne Anderson
39. Joe Andruzzi
40. Charlie Ane III
41. Marger Apsit
42. Lester Archambeau
43. Billy Ard
44. Mike Ariey
45. Jahine Arnold
46. Mike Arthur
47. Rodney Artmore
48. Marion Ashmore
49. Bert Askson
50. Steve Atkins
51. Todd Auer
52. Hise Austin
53. Tavon Austin
54. Alan Autry
55. Steve Avery
56. Buddy Aydelette

== B ==
1. Kennard Backman
2. Byron Bailey
3. Karsten Bailey
4. Bill Bain
5. Bullet Baker
6. Frank Baker
7. David Bakhtiari
8. Zach Bako-Bewele
9. Frank Balazs
10. Al Baldwin
11. Johnathan Baldwin
12. Corey Ballentine
13. Herb Banet
14. Chris Banjo
15. Aaron Banks
16. Brant Banks
17. Keshawn Banks (Note: Keshawn Banks played in a postseason game for the Packers.)
18. Bob Barber
19. Allen Barbre
20. Don Barclay
21. Bryan Barker
22. Roy Barker
23. Emery Barnes
24. Gary Barnes
25. Krys Barnes
26. Nick Barnett
27. Solon Barnett
28. Nate Barragar ‡
29. Jan Barrett
30. Sebastian Barrie
31. Sam Barrington
32. Al Barry
33. Kevin Barry
34. Norman Barry
35. Shemar Bartholomew
36. Don Barton
37. Mike Bartrum
38. Carl Barzilauskas
39. Myrt Basing
40. Michael Basinger
41. Lloyd Baxter
42. Evan Baylis
43. Sanjay Beach
44. Emil Beasy (Note: Emil Beasy played one game for the Packers in 1924 and is included in the Packers.com all-time roster list, however he is not included in the Pro-Football-Reference.com all-time roster list.)
45. Andrew Beck
46. Ken Beck
47. Wayland Becker
48. Brad Bedell
49. Don Beebe
50. Bruce Beekley
51. Reggie Begelton
52. Albert Bell
53. Byron Bell
54. Ed Bell
55. Kahlil Bell
56. Josh Bell
57. Tyrone Bell
58. Anthony Belton
59. Jug Bennett
60. Kurt Benkert
61. Edgar Bennett ‡
62. Martellus Bennett
63. Tony Bennett
64. Cedric Benson
65. Paul Berezney
66. Ed Berrang
67. Connie Mack Berry
68. Ed Berry
69. Gary Berry
70. Larry Bettencourt
71. Tom Bettis
72. David Beverly
73. Kapri Bibbs
74. Josh Bidwell
75. Adolph Bieberstein
76. Vince Biegel
77. Atari Bigby
78. Dick Bilda
79. Lewis Billups
80. John Biolo
81. Tom Birney
82. Desmond Bishop
83. Henry Black
84. Roosevelt Blackmon
85. Will Blackmon
86. Jeff Blackshear
87. Ed Blaine
88. Michael Blair
89. Carl Bland
90. Al Bloodgood
91. Shaun Bodiford
92. Bill Boedeker
93. Chuck Boerio
94. Quinton Bohanna
95. Corey Bojorquez
96. Juran Bolden
97. Conrad Bolston
98. Scott Bolton
99. Warren Bone
100. Steve Bono
101. Vaughn Booker
102. Billy Bookout
103. J. R. Boone
104. Fred Borak
105. Nate Borden
106. Dirk Borgognone
107. Brandon Bostick
108. Jim Bowdoin
109. Matt Bowen
110. David Bowens
111. Ken Bowman ‡
112. Jerry Boyarsky
113. Elmo Boyd
114. Greg Boyd
115. Josh Boyd
116. Jarrett Boykin
117. Tim Boyle
118. Don Bracken
119. Charlie Brackins
120. Ben Braden
121. Carl Bradford
122. Corey Bradford
123. Dave Bradley
124. Hunter Bradley
125. Jeff Brady
126. Byron Braggs
127. Kent Branstetter
128. Zeke Bratkowski ‡
129. Ray Bray
130. Bashaud Breeland
131. Gene Breen
132. John Brennan
133. Kentrell Brice
134. Diyral Briggs
135. Warren Brinson
136. Charley Brock ‡
137. Lou Brock ‡
138. Matt Brock
139. John Brockington ‡
140. Ahmad Brooks
141. Barrett Brooks
142. Bucky Brooks
143. Chris Brooks
144. Karl Brooks
145. Robert Brooks ‡
146. Matt Bross
147. Steve Broussard
148. Aaron Brown
149. Allen Brown
150. Bob Brown
151. Buddy Brown
152. Dave Brown
153. Donatello Brown
154. Fadol Brown
155. Gary Brown
156. Gilbert Brown ‡
157. Jonathan Brown
158. Ken Brown
159. Omar Brown
160. Robert Brown
161. Timothy Brown
162. Tom Brown
163. Tony Brown
164. Ross Browner
165. Hank Bruder ‡
166. Mark Brunell
167. Mike Bucchianeri
168. Willie Buchanon ‡
169. Cub Buck ‡
170. Terrell Buckley
171. Larry Buhler
172. Bryan Bulaga
173. Walt Buland
174. Javon Bullard
175. Hank Bullough
176. Art Bultman
177. James Burgess
178. Ronnie Burgess
179. Oren Burks
180. Morgan Burnett
181. Reggie Burnette
182. Buddy Burris
183. Curtis Burrow
184. Jim Burrow
185. Blair Bush
186. Jarrett Bush
187. Bill Butler
188. Frank Butler
189. LeRoy Butler † ‡
190. Mike Butler
191. Emanuel Byrd

== C ==
1. Brian Cabral
2. Mossy Cade
3. Lee Roy Caffey ‡
4. Tiny Cahoon
5. David Caldwell
6. Joe Callahan
7. De'Vondre Campbell
8. Ibraheim Campbell
9. Rich Campbell
10. James Campen
11. Tony Canadeo † ‡
12. Al Cannava
13. Mark Cannon
14. Dick Capp
15. Jim Capuzzi
16. Joe Carey
17. Waldo Don Carlos
18. Anders Carlson
19. Wes Carlson
20. Al Carmichael ‡
21. Lew Carpenter
22. Tariq Carpenter
23. Fred Carr ‡
24. Alphonso Carreker
25. Ahmad Carroll
26. Leo Carroll
27. Paul Ott Carruth
28. Tra Carson
29. Carl Carter
30. Jim Carter
31. Joe Carter
32. Mike Carter
33. Tony Carter
34. Cy Casper
35. Ron Cassidy
36. Chuck Cecil
37. Don Chandler ‡
38. Antonio Chatman
39. Louis Cheek
40. Bill Cherry
41. Frank Chesley
42. Henry Childs
43. Brandon Chillar
44. Mark Chmura ‡
45. Putt Choate
46. Paul Christman
47. Gus Cifelli
48. Bob Cifers
49. Jack Clancy
50. Chuck Clanton
51. Dennis Claridge
52. Allan Clark
53. Greg Clark
54. Jessie Clark
55. Kenny Clark
56. Michael Clark
57. Vinnie Clark
58. Shannon Clavelle
59. Mark Clayton
60. Bob Clemens
61. Cal Clemens
62. Ray Clemons
63. Sean Clifford
64. Chad Clifton ‡
65. Ha Ha Clinton-Dix
66. Jack Cloud
67. Randall Cobb
68. Reggie Cobb
69. Jack Coco
70. Ed Cody
71. Junior Coffey
72. Paul Coffman ‡
73. Colin Cole
74. Keo Coleman
75. Lavon Coleman
76. Daryn Colledge
77. Steve Collier
78. Albin Collins
79. Bobby Collins
80. Brett Collins
81. Mark Collins
82. Nick Collins ‡
83. Patrick Collins
84. Shawn Collins
85. Derek Combs
86. Irv Comp ‡
87. Chuck Compton
88. Rudy Comstock
89. Jack Concannon
90. Fred Cone ‡
91. Dave Conway
92. James Cook
93. Jared Cook
94. Kelly Cook
95. Ted Cook
96. Bill Cooke
97. Kerry Cooks
98. Mark Cooney
99. Edgerrin Cooper
100. Russell Copeland
101. John Corker
102. Junius Coston
103. Frank Coughlin
104. Larry Coutre
105. Brenton Cox Jr.
106. Ron Cox
107. Tom Crabtree
108. Larry Craig ‡
109. James Crawford
110. Keith Crawford
111. Ted Cremer
112. Leon Crenshaw
113. Bernie Crimmins
114. John Crockett
115. Tiny Croft
116. Tommy Cronin
117. Mason Crosby
118. Dave Croston
119. Ray Crouse
120. Jim Crowley
121. Tommy Joe Crutcher
122. Ward Cuff
123. Jim Culbreath
124. Al Culver
125. Tyrone Culver
126. George Cumby
127. Mike Curcio
128. Dan Currie ‡
129. Bill Curry
130. Scott Curry
131. Andy Cvercko
132. Hec Cyre

== D ==
1. Drake Dabney
2. Dominique Dafney
3. Tom Dahms
4. Carroll Dale ‡
5. Joe Danelo
6. Ave Daniell
7. Mike Daniels
8. Ernie Danjean
9. Chris Darkins
10. Boob Darling ‡
11. Najeh Davenport
12. Wayne Davenport
13. Don Davey
14. Ben Davidson
15. Anthony Davis
16. Dave Davis
17. Harper Davis
18. Kenneth Davis
19. Knile Davis
20. Pahl Davis
21. Ralph Davis
22. Rob Davis
23. Shawn Davis
24. Trevor Davis
25. Tyler Davis
26. Tyrone Davis
27. Willie Davis † ‡
28. Dale Dawson
29. Gib Dawson
30. Walter Dean
31. Don Deeks
32. Bob Dees
33. Tony Degrate
34. Josiah Deguara
35. Jim DeLisle
36. Jeff Dellenbach
37. Tony DeLuca
38. Jim Del Gaizo
39. Al Del Greco
40. Patrick Dendy
41. Preston Dennard
42. Burnell Dent
43. Dick Deschaine
44. Ty Detmer
45. Quinton Dial
46. Lynn Dickey ‡
47. Clint Didier
48. Na'il Diggs
49. Trevon Diggs
50. Andre Dillard
51. A. J. Dillon
52. Bobby Dillon † ‡
53. Anthony Dilweg
54. LaVern Dilweg ‡
55. Rich Dimler
56. Antonio Dingle
57. Ray DiPierro
58. Leo Disend
59. John Dittrich
60. Mark D'Onofrio
61. Mike Donohoe
62. Makinton Dorleant
63. Matthew Dorsett
64. Dean Dorsey
65. John Dorsey
66. Kevin Dorsey
67. Earl Dotson ‡
68. Santana Dotson
69. Romeo Doubs
70. Rasul Douglas
71. Bobby Douglass
72. Mike Douglass ‡
73. Corey Dowden
74. Steve Dowden
75. Boyd Dowler ‡
76. Brian Dowling
77. Kenyan Drake
78. Dave Drechsler
79. Wally Dreyer
80. Donald Driver ‡
81. Jeff Drost
82. Chuck Drulis
83. Forey Duckett
84. Dukes Duford
85. Paul Duhart
86. Jamie Dukes
87. Jamon Dumas-Johnson
88. Bill DuMoe
89. Dave Dunaway
90. Ken Duncan
91. Red Dunn ‡
92. Merton Dunnigan

== E ==
1. Biren Ealy
2. Ralph Earhart
3. Jug Earp ‡
4. Roger Eason
5. Ed Ecker
6. Antuan Edwards
7. Earl Edwards
8. Gary Ellerson
9. Tony Elliot
10. Carlton Elliott
11. Jayrone Elliott
12. Gerry Ellis ‡
13. Ken Ellis ‡
14. Kingsley Enagbare
15. Dick Enderle
16. Paul Engebretsen ‡
17. Wuert Engelmann
18. Rex Enright
19. Phil Epps
20. Tyler Ervin
21. Mike Estep
22. Joe Ethridge
23. Dick Evans
24. Doug Evans
25. Jack Evans
26. Jahri Evans
27. Lon Evans ‡
28. Marwin Evans

== F ==
1. Kyler Fackrell
2. Tony Falkenstein
3. Mike Fanucci
4. Hal Faverty
5. Brett Favre † ‡
6. John Faye
7. Greg Feasel
8. Beattie Feathers
9. Robert Ferguson
10. Howie Ferguson ‡
11. Vince Ferragamo
12. Bill Ferrario
13. Lou Ferry
14. Angelo Fields (Note: Angelo Fields played in two postseason games for the Packers.)
15. Jermichael Finley
16. Tom Finnin
17. Tony Fisher
18. Kevin Fitzgerald
19. Paul Fitzgibbon
20. John FitzPatrick
21. Dick Flaherty
22. Mike Flanagan
23. Jim Flanigan
24. Jim Flanigan Sr.
25. Marv Fleming ‡
26. Ryan Flinn
27. Bob Flowers
28. Bobby Jack Floyd
29. Matt Flynn
30. Tom Flynn
31. Lee Folkins
32. Herman Fontenot
33. Therrian Fontenot
34. Jonathan Ford
35. Len Ford †
36. Rudy Ford
37. Trevor Ford
38. Bill Forester ‡
39. Aldo Forte
40. Bob Forte ‡
41. Chris Francies
42. Joe Francis
43. Robert Francois
44. Johnathan Franklin
45. Ray Frankowski
46. Bubba Franks
47. Herb Franta
48. Nolan Franz
49. Todd Franz
50. Paul Frase
51. Antonio Freeman ‡
52. Bobby Freeman
53. Sherwood Fries
54. Ted Fritsch ‡
55. Derrick Frost
56. Ed Frutig
57. Curtis Fuller
58. Joe Fuller
59. Brent Fullwood
60. Chuck Fusina

== G ==
1. Steve Gabbard
2. Samkon Gado
3. Innis Gaines
4. Scott Galbraith
5. Harry Galbreath
6. Tipa Galeai
7. Milt Gantenbein ‡
8. Eddie Garcia
9. Gus Gardella
10. Moose Gardner
11. Rod Gardner
12. Bobby Garrett
13. Len Garrett
14. Jonathan Garvin
15. Rashan Gary
16. Ron Gassert
17. Bruce Gaston
18. Lester Gatewood
19. Buck Gavin
20. Kent Gaydos
21. Kabeer Gbaja-Biamila ‡
22. Garth Gerhart
23. Charlie Getty
24. Breno Giacomini
25. Paul Gibson
26. Reggie Gilbert
27. Jim Gillette
28. Gale Gillingham ‡
29. Willie Gillus
30. Matt Giordano
31. Jug Girard
32. Chris Gizzi
33. Leland Glass
34. Terry Glenn
35. Ed Glick
36. Travis Glover
37. Derrel Gofourth
38. Charles Goldenberg ‡
39. Brett Goode
40. Herbert Goodman
41. Les Goodman
42. Clyde Goodnight
43. B. J. Goodson
44. Demetri Goodson
45. Matthew Golden
46. Darrien Gordon
47. Dick Gordon
48. Josh Gordy
49. Lou Gordon
50. Ken Gorgal
51. Jim Grabowski
52. Jay Graham
53. Jimmy Graham
54. David Grant
55. Ryan Grant
56. Cecil Gray
57. Jack "Dolly" Gray
58. Johnnie Gray ‡
59. Ahman Green ‡
60. Alex Green
61. Jessie Green
62. Howard Green
63. Raven Greene
64. Tiger Greene
65. Norm Greeney
66. Tom Greenfield
67. David Greenwood
68. Forrest Gregg † ‡
69. Hank Gremminger ‡
70. Hal Griffen
71. Billy Grimes
72. Dan Grimm
73. Earl Gros
74. Roger Grove
75. Bob Gruber
76. Jim Gueno
77. Letroy Guion
78. LaDarius Gunter

== H ==
1. Dale Hackbart
2. Joey Hackett
3. Kamal Hadden
4. Michael Haddix
5. John Hadl
6. Darryl Haley
7. Charlie Hall
8. Korey Hall
9. Lamont Hall
10. Mark Hall
11. Ron Hallstrom
12. LaDarius Hamilton
13. Ruffin Hamilton
14. Dave Hampton
15. Dave Hanner ‡
16. Frank Hanny
17. Don Hansen
18. Harold Hansen
19. Chris Hanson
20. Jake Hanson
21. Derrick Harden
22. Leon Harden
23. Roger Harding
24. Kevin Hardy
25. Jimmy Hargrove
26. Chris Harper
27. Graham Harrell
28. Justin Harrell
29. Willard Harrell
30. Al Harris ‡
31. Alonzo Harris
32. Bernardo Harris
33. Corey Harris
34. De'Jon Harris
35. DuJuan Harris
36. Jack Harris
37. Jackie Harris
38. Leotis Harris
39. Raymont Harris
40. Tim Harris ‡
41. William Harris
42. Anthony Harrison
43. Damon Harrison
44. Derek Hart
45. Doug Hart
46. Perry Hartnett
47. Keith Hartwig
48. Maurice Harvey
49. Matt Hasselbeck
50. Dave Hathcock
51. Tim Hauck
52. Dennis Havig
53. Lucas Havrisik
54. Spencer Havner
55. A. J. Hawk
56. Josh Hawkins
57. Mike Hawkins
58. Michael Hawthorne
59. Ken Haycraft
60. Aaron Hayden
61. Chris Hayes
62. Dave Hayes
63. Gary Hayes
64. Norbert Hayes
65. Bill Hayhoe
66. George Hays
67. Casey Hayward
68. Les Hearden
69. Tom Hearden
70. Malik Heath
71. Stan Heath
72. Jack Heflin
73. Larry Hefner
74. Craig Heimburger
75. Paul Held
76. Jerry Helluin
77. William Henderson ‡
78. Dutch Hendrian
79. Ted Hendricks †
80. Urban Henry
81. Craig Hentrich
82. Arnie Herber † ‡
83. Noah Herron
84. Larry Hickman
85. Don Highsmith
86. Don Hill
87. Jim Hill
88. Kylin Hill
89. Michael Hill
90. Nate Hill
91. John Hilton
92. Dick Himes
93. Clarke Hinkle † ‡
94. Hal Hinte
95. Jim Hobbins
96. Nate Hobbs
97. Abdul Hodge
98. Gary Hoffman
99. Carlyle Holiday
100. Darius Holland
101. Johnny Holland ‡
102. Ed Holler
103. Vonnie Holliday
104. Lamont Hollinquest
105. Justin Hollins
106. Ka'dar Hollman
107. Rob Holmberg
108. Darick Holmes
109. Jerry Holmes
110. Estus Hood
111. Charles Hope
112. Ty'Ron Hopper
113. Don Horn
114. Paul Hornung † ‡
115. Jason Horton
116. Davon House
117. Bobby Houston
118. Desmond Howard
119. Tubby Howard
120. John Howell
121. Billy Howton ‡
122. Cal Hubbard † ‡
123. Harlan Huckleby
124. Bob Hudson
125. Tim Huffman
126. Tom Hull
127. Donnie Humphrey
128. Tory Humphrey
129. Brett Hundley
130. Cletidus Hunt
131. Ervin Hunt
132. Kevin Hunt
133. Mike Hunt
134. Art Hunter
135. Jason Hunter
136. Scott Hunter
137. Tony Hunter
138. Paul Hutchins
139. Don Hutson † ‡
140. Micah Hyde
141. Bob Hyland

== I ==
1. Tunch Ilkin
2. Ken Iman
3. Bob Ingalls
4. Darryl Ingram
5. Mark Ingram Sr.
6. Cecil Isbell ‡
7. Eddie Lee Ivery

== J ==
1. Chris Jacke ‡
2. Alcender Jackson
3. Brandon Jackson
4. Chris Jackson
5. Darius Jackson
6. Don Jackson
7. Grady Jackson
8. Josh Jackson
9. James Jackson
10. Johnnie Jackson
11. Keith Jackson
12. Melvin Jackson
13. Allen Jacobs
14. Jack Jacobs
15. Josh Jacobs
16. Harry Jacunski ‡
17. Van Jakes
18. Natrell Jamerson
19. Claudis James
20. Ernie Janet
21. Jeff Janis
22. Eddie Jankowski ‡
23. Val Jansante
24. Craig Jay
25. Walt Jean
26. Shemar Jean-Charles
27. Ricky Jean Francois
28. Norman Jefferson
29. John Jefferson
30. Ray Jennison
31. Noel Jenke
32. Billy Jenkins
33. Cullen Jenkins
34. Elgton Jenkins
35. Donovan Jennings
36. Greg Jennings ‡
37. Jim Jennings
38. M. D. Jennings
39. Jim Jensen
40. Greg Jensen
41. Travis Jervey
42. Bob Jeter ‡
43. Ulrick John
44. Anthony Johnson Jr.
45. Bill Johnson
46. Charles Johnson
47. Daniel Johnson
48. Ezra Johnson ‡
49. Glenn Johnson
50. Howard Johnson
51. Joe F. Johnson
52. Joe T. Johnson
53. Kenneth Johnson
54. Keshon Johnson
55. Marvin Johnson
56. LeShon Johnson
57. Quinn Johnson
58. Randy Johnson
59. Reggie Johnson
60. Sammy Johnson
61. Tom Johnson
62. Swede Johnston ‡
63. Johnny Jolly
64. Mike Jolly
65. Aaron Jones
66. Bobby Jones
67. Boyd Jones
68. Brad Jones
69. Bruce Jones
70. Caleb Jones
71. Calvin Jones
72. Daryll Jones
73. Datone Jones
74. Jamal Jones
75. James Jones
76. Josh Jones
77. Kobe Jones
78. Potsy Jones
79. Ron Jones
80. Scott Jones
81. Sean Jones
82. Terry Jones
83. Charles Jordan
84. Henry Jordan † ‡
85. Ken Jordan
86. Carl Jorgenson
87. Steve Josue
88. Seth Joyner
89. Bhawoh Jue
90. John Jurkovic

== K ==
1. Bob Kahler
2. Royal Kahler
3. Aaron Kampman ‡
4. Jeremy Kapinos
5. Leo Katalinas
6. Kani Kauahi
7. Jim Keane
8. Emmett Keefe
9. Jakobie Keeney-James
10. Kingsley Keke
11. Jim Kekeris
12. Paul Kell
13. Bill Kelley
14. Dennis Kelly
15. Joe Kelly
16. Kyu Blu Kelly
17. Perry Kemp
18. Lance Kendricks
19. Bob Kercher
20. Bill Kern
21. Joe Kerridge
22. Ken Keuper
23. Blair Kiel
24. Walt Kiesling †
25. Kelvin Kight
26. Warren Kilbourne
27. Bobby Kimball
28. J. D. Kimmel
29. Billy Kinard
30. Randy Kinder
31. David King
32. Don King
33. Don King
34. Darian Kinnard
35. Kevin King
36. Jack Kirby
37. Christian Kirksey
38. Syd Kitson
39. Jim Kitts
40. DeShone Kizer
41. Fee Klaus
42. Adrian Klemm
43. Adolph Kliebhan
44. Gary Knafelc ‡
45. Lindsay Knapp
46. Gene Knutson
47. Steve Knutson
48. Matt Koart
49. Greg Koch ‡
50. Mark Koncar
51. Ed Konopasek
52. George Koonce
53. David Kopay
54. Ron Kostelnik ‡
55. Eddie Kotal
56. John Kovatch
57. Bob Kowalkowski
58. Tucker Kraft
59. Jerry Kramer † ‡
60. Ron Kramer ‡
61. Ken Kranz
62. Larry Krause
63. Ryan Krause
64. Bob Kroll
65. Bob Kuberski
66. Rudy Kuechenberg
67. John Kuhn
68. Jake Kumerow
69. Joe Kurth
70. Bill Kuusisto

== L ==
1. Matt LaBounty
2. Eddie Lacy
3. Wally Ladrow
4. Bob Lally
5. Curly Lambeau † ‡
6. Pete Lammons
7. Tyler Lancaster
8. Walt Landers
9. Sean Landeta
10. MacArthur Lane
11. T. J. Lang
12. Jim Lankas
13. Danny Lansanah
14. Bill Larson
15. Kurt Larson
16. Ojay Larson
17. Jim Laslavic
18. Kit Lathrop
19. Jamari Lattimore
20. Dutch Lauer
21. Larry Lauer
22. Jim Laughlin
23. Jimmy Lawrence
24. Joe Laws ‡
25. Allen Lazard
26. Vonta Leach
27. John Leake
28. Wes Leaper
29. Dallin Leavitt
30. Bill Lee
31. Charles Lee
32. Donald Lee
33. James Lee
34. Mark Lee ‡
35. Pat Lee
36. ReShard Lee
37. Charles Leigh
38. Tony Leiker
39. Paris Lenon
40. Bobby Leopold
41. Darrell Lester
42. Russ Letlow ‡
43. Dorsey Levens ‡
44. Verne Lewellen ‡
45. Cliff Lewis
46. Gary Lewis
47. Marcedes Lewis
48. Mark Lewis
49. Mike Lewis
50. Ron Lewis
51. Tim Lewis
52. Cully Lidberg
53. Alex Light
54. Corey Linsley
55. Paul Lipscomb
56. Earl Little
57. Dale Livingston
58. MarShawn Lloyd
59. James Lofton † ‡
60. David Logan
61. Dick Logan
62. Slick Lollar
63. Antonio London
64. Bob Long
65. David Long
66. Ryan Longwell ‡
67. Ace Loomis
68. James Looney
69. Jack Losch
70. Rick Lovato
71. Jordan Love
72. John Lovett
73. Dean Lowry
74. Chad Lucas
75. Nick Luchey
76. Bill Lucky
77. Bill Lueck
78. Nolan Luhn
79. Steve Luke
80. Kregg Lumpkin
81. Booth Lusteg
82. Dewey Lyle
83. Del Lyman
84. Billy Lyon

== M ==
1. Bill Maas
2. Red Mack
3. Tom MacLeod
4. Buster Maddox
5. Don Majkowski ‡
6. Alfred Malone
7. Grover Malone
8. Tony Mandarich
9. Chris Mandeville
10. Leon Manley
11. Bob Mann ‡
12. Errol Mann
13. Brian Manning
14. Roy Manning
15. Terrell Manning
16. Von Mansfield
17. Marquand Manuel
18. Chester Marcol ‡
19. Larry Marks
20. Bud Marshall
21. Torrance Marshall
22. Herman Martell
23. Charles Martin
24. David Martin
25. Derrick Martin
26. Ingle Martin
27. Kamal Martin
28. Ruvell Martin
29. Blake Martinez
30. John Martinkovic ‡
31. Russell Maryland
32. Dave Mason
33. Joel Mason
34. Larry Mason
35. Carlton Massey
36. Norm Masters
37. Tim Masthay
38. Stan Mataele
39. Charlie Mathys ‡
40. Pat Matson
41. Al Matthews
42. Aubrey Matthews
43. Clay Matthews III ‡
44. Harry Mattos
45. Marv Matuszak
46. Frank Mayer
47. Derrick Mayes
48. Devante Mays
49. Kivuusama Mays
50. Jack McAuliffe
51. Ron McBride
52. Tod McBride
53. Bob McCaffrey
54. Larry McCarren ‡
55. Eugene McCaslin
56. Dave McCloughan
57. Phil McConkey
58. Mike C. McCoy
59. Mike P. McCoy
60. Herdis McCrary
61. Justin McCray
62. Dustin McDonald
63. Bob McDougal
64. John McDowell
65. Isaiah McDuffie
66. Blaine McElmurry
67. Scott McGarrahan
68. John McGarry
69. Walt McGaw
70. Clarence McGeary
71. Buford McGee
72. Max McGee ‡
73. Rich McGeorge
74. Lenny McGill
75. Sylvester McGrew
76. Mike McGruder
77. Gene McGuire
78. Lamar McHan
79. Sean McHugh
80. Don McIlhenny
81. Guy McIntyre
82. Paul McJulien
83. Roy McKay
84. Keith McKenzie
85. Mike McKenzie
86. Raleigh McKenzie
87. Xavier McKinney
88. Joe McLaughlin
89. Lee McLaughlin
90. Ray McLean
91. Mike McLeod
92. Jim McMahon
93. Brandon McManus
94. Herb McMath
95. Steve McMichael †
96. Ernie McMillan
97. Jerron McMillian
98. Dexter McNabb
99. Johnny "Blood" McNally † ‡
100. Forrest McPherson
101. Mike Meade
102. Rondell Mealey
103. Steve Meilinger
104. Rydell Melancon
105. James Melka
106. Bo Melton
107. Ruben Mendoza
108. Chuck Mercein
109. Mike Mercer
110. Whitney Mercilus
111. Phillip Merling
112. Casey Merrill
113. Mark Merrill
114. Mike Merriweather (Note: Mike Merriweather played in a postseason game for the Packers.)
115. Frank Mestnik
116. Eric Metcalf
117. Jim Meyer
118. Christine Michael
119. Lou Michaels
120. Walt Michaels
121. Mike Michalske † ‡
122. John Michels
123. Terry Mickens
124. Terdell Middleton
125. Lou Midler
126. Lou Mihajlovich
127. Don Milan
128. Keith Millard
129. Don Miller
130. Ookie Miller
131. John Miller
132. John J. Miller
133. Jordan Miller
134. Paul Miller
135. Tom Miller
136. Stan Mills
137. Paul Minick
138. Brandon Miree
139. Basil Mitchell
140. Charlie Mitchell
141. Roland Mitchell
142. Mike Moffitt
143. Dick Moje
144. Bo Molenda
145. Tony Moll
146. Ron Monaco
147. Jacob Monk
148. Bob Monnett ‡
149. Henry Monroe
150. Michael Montgomery
151. Ty Montgomery
152. A. Al Moore
153. Blake Moore
154. Brent Moore
155. David Moore
156. Jason Moore
157. J'Mon Moore
158. Rich Moore
159. Tom Moore
160. Rich Moran
161. Vernand Morency
162. Tim Moresco
163. Anthony Morgan
164. Jordan Morgan
165. Jim Bob Morris
166. Larry Morris
167. Lee Morris
168. Antonio Morrison
169. Jim Morrissey
170. Mike Morton
171. Arron Mosby
172. Dom Moselle
173. Dezman Moses
174. J. J. Moses
175. Russ Mosley
176. Perry Moss
177. Buster Mott
178. Joe Mott
179. Daniel Muir
180. Roderick Mullen
181. Carl Mulleneaux ‡
182. Lee Mulleneaux
183. Andy Mulumba
184. Kyle Murphy
185. Mark Murphy ‡
186. Terrence Murphy
187. Jab Murray
188. Luke Musgrave
189. Josh Myers

== N ==
1. Romanus Nadolney
2. Craig Nall
3. Dimitri Nance
4. Brayden Narveson
5. Tom Nash
6. Hannibal Navies
7. Ed Neal
8. Frankie Neal
9. Mike Neal
10. Bill Neill
11. Bob Nelson
12. Jordy Nelson ‡
13. Jim Nelson
14. Tom Neville
15. Marshall Newhouse
16. Royce Newman
17. Craig Newsome
18. Isaiah Neyor (Note: Isaiah Neyor played in a postseason game for the Packers.)
19. Hamilton Nichols
20. Hardy Nickerson
21. Parry Nickerson
22. Nick Niemann
23. Walter Niemann
24. Yosh Nijman
25. Ray Nitschke † ‡
26. Doyle Nix
27. Fred Nixon
28. James Nixon
29. Keisean Nixon
30. Brian Noble
31. Danny Noonan
32. Al Norgard
33. Jerry Norton
34. Marty Norton
35. Rick Norton
36. Bob Nussbaumer
37. Rick Nuzum
38. Chukie Nwokorie
39. Lee Nystrom

== O ==
1. Brad Oates
2. Carleton Oats
3. Cyril Obiozor
4. Harry O'Boyle
5. Bob O'Connor
6. Chris Odom
7. Steve Odom
8. Pat O'Donahue
9. Dick O'Donnell
10. Pat O'Donnell
11. Urban Odson
12. Alfred Oglesby
13. Earl Ohlgren
14. Steve Okoniewski
15. Kitan Oladapo
16. Collin Oliver
17. Muhammad Oliver
18. Ralph Olsen
19. Larry Olsonoski
20. Tom O'Malley
21. Andre O'Neal
22. Ed O'Neil
23. Dan Orlich
24. Matthew Orzech
25. Dave Osborn
26. Dwayne O'Steen
27. J. T. O'Sullivan
28. Rip Owens
29. Jonathan Owens

== P ==
1. Nate Palmer
2. Tony Palmer
3. Sam Palumbo
4. Adam Pankey
5. Ernie Pannell
6. Oran Pape
7. John Papit
8. Babe Parilli
9. De'Mond Parker
10. Freddie Parker
11. Chet Parlavecchio
12. Micah Parsons
13. Keith Paskett
14. George Paskvan
15. Frank Patrick
16. Lucas Patrick
17. Shawn Patterson
18. Ricky Patton
19. Tony Paulekas
20. Bryce Paup
21. Ken Payne
22. Henry Pearson
23. Lindy Pearson
24. Francis Peay
25. Doug Pederson
26. Ray Pelfrey
27. Mike Pennel
28. Taybor Pepper
29. Julius Peppers †
30. Charlie Peprah
31. Justin Perillo
32. Don Perkins
33. Tom Perko
34. Claude Perry
35. Nick Perry
36. Dick Pesonen
37. Kenny Peterson
38. Les Peterson
39. Ray Peterson
40. John Petitbon
41. Kenneth Pettway
42. David Petway
43. Bruce Pickens
44. Ryan Pickett
45. Lenzy Pipkins
46. Steve Pisarkiewicz
47. Elijah Pitts ‡
48. Ron Pitts
49. Eddie Pleasant
50. Kurt Ploeger
51. John Pointer
52. Bucky Pope
53. P. J. Pope
54. Brady Poppinga
55. Joe Porter
56. Sammy Powers
57. Guy Prather
58. Merv Pregulman
59. Hal Prescott
60. Roell Preston
61. Brian Price
62. Mike Prior
63. Steve Pritko
64. Joe Prokop
65. Fred Provo
66. Jim Psaltis
67. Pid Purdy
68. Dave Pureifory
69. Frank Purnell

== Q ==
1. Andrew Quarless
2. Jess Quatse
3. Jeff Query
4. Bill Quinlan

== R ==
1. Ken Radick
2. Vince Rafferty
3. B. J. Raji
4. Randy Ramsey
5. Damarious Randall
6. Al Randolph
7. Terry Randolph
8. Keith Ranspot
9. Lou Rash
10. Baby Ray ‡
11. Dave Rayner
12. Cornelius Redick
13. Will Redmond
14. Jarran Reed
15. Jayden Reed
16. Pete Regnier
17. Bill Reichardt
18. Floyd Reid
19. Bill Renner
20. Jamal Reynolds
21. Jay Rhodemyre
22. Sean Rhyan
23. Allen Rice
24. Gary Richard
25. Sean Richardson
26. Ray Riddick
27. Jordon Riley
28. Jim Ringo † ‡
29. Christian Ringo
30. Aaron Ripkowski
31. Alan Risher
32. Andre Rison
33. Marco Rivera ‡
34. Chauncey Rivers
35. John Roach
36. Austin Robbins
37. Tootie Robbins
38. Bill Roberts
39. Bill Robinson
40. Charley Robinson
41. Dave Robinson † ‡
42. Eugene Robinson
43. James Robinson
44. Koren Robinson
45. Luther Robinson
46. Michael Robinson
47. Tommy Robison
48. Alden Roche
49. Robert Rochell
50. Aaron Rodgers
51. Amari Rodgers
52. Del Rodgers
53. Richard Rodgers
54. Nick Rogers
55. Herm Rohrig
56. Dave Roller
57. Quinten Rollins
58. Mark Roman
59. Al Romine
60. Rudy Rosatti
61. Al Rose
62. Ken Roskie
63. Jeremy Ross
64. Dan Ross
65. Allen Rossum
66. Tobin Rote ‡
67. Aaron Rouse
68. John Rowser
69. Larry Rubens
70. T. J. Rubley
71. Paul Rudzinski
72. Grey Ruegamer
73. Ken Ruettgers ‡
74. Howie Ruetz
75. Gordon Rule
76. Jon Runyan
77. Anthony Rush
78. Clive Rush
79. KeiVarae Russell
80. Steve Ruzich
81. Jake Ryan
82. Jon Ryan

== S ==
1. Brandon Saine
2. Harvey Salem
3. Jim Salsbury
4. Chuck Sample
5. Howard Sampson
6. Ron Sams
7. Stanford Samuels III
8. B. J. Sander
9. Dan Sandifer
10. Terdell Sands
11. John Sandusky
12. Al Sarafiny
13. Brian Satterfield
14. Jeff Saturday
15. George Sauer
16. Russ Saunders
17. Darnell Savage
18. Hurles Scales
19. Zud Schammel
20. Bernie Scherer
21. Walt Schlinkman
22. Art Schmaehl
23. George Schmidt
24. John Schmitt
25. Herm Schneidman
26. Roy Schoemann
27. Bill Schroeder
28. Bill Schroll
29. Carl Schuette
30. Harry Schuh
31. Jeff Schuh
32. Charles Schultz
33. Jake Schum
34. Tar Schwammel
35. J. K. Scott
36. Patrick Scott
37. Randy Scott
38. Vernon Scott
39. Bucky Scribner
40. Joe Secord
41. George Seeman
42. Champ Seibold
43. Clarence Self
44. Wash Serini
45. Jim Shanley
46. Sterling Sharpe † ‡
47. Darren Sharper
48. Deck Shelley
49. Darrius Shepherd
50. Derek Sherrod
51. Joe Shield
52. Sam Shields
53. Fred Shirey
54. Mark Shumate
55. Vai Sikahema
56. Dave Simmons
57. John Simmons
58. Wayne Simmons
59. Maurice Simpkins
60. Ron Simpkins
61. Jaylin Simpson
62. Nate Simpson
63. Travis Simpson
64. Ben Sims
65. Joe Sims
66. Josh Sitton ‡
67. Daryle Skaugstad
68. Gil Skeate
69. Joe Skibinski
70. Gerald Skinner
71. Bob Skoglund
72. Bob Skoronski ‡
73. Tedarrell Slaton
74. T. J. Slaughter
75. Elmer Sleight
76. Anthony Smith
77. Barry Smith
78. Barty Smith
79. Ben Smith
80. Blane Smith
81. Bruce Smith
82. D. J. Smith
83. Donnell Smith
84. Edward Smith
85. Edwin Smith
86. Ernie Smith
87. Evan Smith
88. Jaylon Smith
89. Jermaine Smith
90. Jerry Smith
91. Kevin Smith
92. Larry Smith
93. Lecitus Smith
94. Maurice Smith
95. Ollie Smith
96. Perry Smith
97. Preston Smith
98. Red Smith
99. Rex Smith
100. Rod Smith
101. Tremon Smith
102. Warren Smith
103. Wes Smith
104. Za'Darius Smith
105. Ken Snelling
106. Malcolm Snider
107. Matt Snider
108. Vic So'oto
109. Glen Sorenson
110. Barryn Sorrell
111. John Spagnola
112. Al Sparlis
113. Ron Spears
114. Ollie Spencer
115. Joe Spencer
116. John Spilis
117. Jack Spinks
118. Jason Spitz
119. Jason Spriggs
120. Marcus Spriggs
121. Dennis Sproul
122. Ray Stachowicz
123. Nazir Stackhouse
124. Jon Staggers
125. Dick Stahlman
126. Walter Stanley
127. Don Stansauk
128. Ken Starch
129. James Starks
130. Paul Staroba
131. Bart Starr † ‡
132. Ben Starret
133. Ben Steele
134. Frank Steen
135. Rebel Steiner
136. Jan Stenerud † ‡
137. Scott Stephen
138. John Stephens
139. Dave Stephenson
140. John Sterling
141. Jace Sternberger
142. Billy Stevens
143. Steve Stewart
144. Ken Stills
145. Barry Stokes
146. Eric Stokes
147. Tim Stokes
148. John Stonebraker
149. Jake Stoneburner
150. Fred Strickland
151. Lyle Sturgeon
152. Equanimeous St. Brown
153. Carl Sullivan
154. Chandon Sullivan
155. John Sullivan
156. Bob Summerhays
157. Don Summers
158. Ty Summers
159. Mickey Sutton
160. Bud Svendsen ‡
161. George Svendsen ‡
162. Brett Swain
163. Karl Swanke
164. Erwin Swiney
165. Veryl Switzer
166. Harry Sydney
167. John Symank
168. Len Szafaryn

== T ==
1. Jerry Tagge
2. Damon Tassos
3. Claude Taugher
4. Mark Tauscher ‡
5. Aaron Taylor
6. Ben Taylor
7. Cliff Taylor
8. Jim Taylor † ‡
9. Kitrick Taylor
10. Lane Taylor
11. Lenny Taylor
12. Malik Taylor
13. Patrick Taylor
14. Ryan Taylor
15. Willie Taylor
16. George Teague
17. Kadeem Telfort
18. Jim Temp
19. Bob Tenner
20. Luke Tenuta
21. Pat Terrell
22. Deral Teteak ‡
23. Keith Thibodeaux
24. John Thierry
25. Ben Thomas
26. Ike Thomas
27. Joe Thomas
28. Joey Thomas
29. Kiondre Thomas
30. Lavale Thomas
31. Robert Thomas
32. Bobby Thomason
33. Jeff Thomason
34. Arland Thompson
35. Aundra Thompson
36. Darrell Thompson
37. Jeremy Thompson
38. John Thompson
39. Tuffy Thompson
40. Jeremy Thornburg
41. Andrae Thurman
42. Fuzzy Thurston ‡
43. George Timberlake
44. Adam Timmerman
45. Gerald Tinker
46. Pete Tinsley ‡
47. Nelson Toburen
48. Chuck Tollefson
49. Scott Tolzien
50. Mike Tomczak
51. Jared Tomich
52. Tom Toner
53. Clayton Tonnemaker
54. Robert Tonyan
55. Korey Toomer
56. Anthony Toribio
57. Eric Torkelson
58. Samori Toure
59. Keith Traylor
60. JC Tretter
61. Jordan Tripp
62. Bill Troup
63. R-Kal Truluck
64. Esera Tuaolo
65. Walter Tullis
66. Clayton Tune
67. Emlen Tunnell †
68. Billy Turner
69. Maurice Turner
70. Richard Turner
71. Wylie Turner
72. Miles Turpin
73. George Tuttle
74. Frank Twedell

== U ==
1. Keith Uecker
2. Brandon Underwood
3. Marviel Underwood
4. Andy Uram ‡
5. Alex Urban
6. Eddie Usher

== V ==
1. Dominic Vairo
2. Marquez Valdes-Scantling
3. Carrington Valentine
4. Bruce Van Dyke
5. Hal Van Every
6. Cole Van Lanen
7. Lukas Van Ness
8. Greg Van Roten
9. Clyde Van Sickle
10. Pete Van Valkenburg
11. Phil Vandersea
12. Vernon Vanoy
13. Fred Vant Hull
14. Randy Vataha
15. Alan Veingrad
16. Jared Veldheer
17. Ross Verba
18. Carl Vereen
19. George Vergara
20. David Viaene
21. Vince Villanucci
22. Fred Vinson
23. Danny Vitale
24. Evan Vogds
25. Justin Vogel
26. Lloyd Voss
27. Tillie Voss

== W ==
1. Jude Waddy
2. Charlie Wade
3. Carl Wafer
4. Bryan Wagner
5. Buff Wagner
6. Rick Wagner
7. Steve Wagner
8. Mike Wahle
9. Erik Walden
10. Cleo Walker
11. Frank Walker
12. Javon Walker
13. Josh Walker
14. Malcolm Walker
15. Quay Walker
16. Randy Walker
17. Rasheed Walker
18. Rod Walker
19. Sammy Walker
20. Val Joe Walker
21. Calvin Wallace
22. Seneca Wallace
23. Taco Wallace
24. Wesley Walls
25. Ward Walsh
26. Tyson Walter
27. Steve Warren
28. Chuck Washington
29. Herb Waters
30. Sammy Watkins
31. Christian Watson
32. Elbert Watts
33. Nate Wayne
34. Clarence Weathers
35. Jim Weatherwax
36. Gary Weaver
37. Chuck Webb
38. Dutch Webber
39. Tim Webster
40. Mike Weddington
41. Ray Wehba
42. Lee Weigel
43. Dick Weisgerber
44. Clayton Weishuhn
45. Kristian Welch
46. Mike Wellman
47. Don Wells
48. Scott Wells
49. Terry Wells
50. Ed West
51. Pat West
52. Bryant Westbrook
53. Ryan Wetnight
54. Cowboy Wheeler
55. Daniel Whelan
56. Bill Whitaker
57. Adrian White
58. Chris White
59. Gene White
60. Johnny White
61. Myles White
62. Reggie White † ‡
63. Tracy White
64. Jermaine Whitehead
65. David Whitehurst
66. James Whitley
67. Jesse Whittenton ‡
68. Will Whitticker
69. Josh Whyle
70. Bob Wicks
71. Dontayvion Wicks
72. Ron Widby
73. Doug Widell
74. Dick Wildung ‡
75. Matt Wilhelm
76. Elmer Wilkens
77. Bruce Wilkerson
78. Muhammad Wilkerson
79. Gabe Wilkins
80. Marcus Wilkins
81. Kevin Willhite
82. A. D. Williams
83. Brian Williams
84. Clarence Williams
85. Corey Williams
86. Delvin Williams
87. Dexter Williams
88. D. J. Williams
89. Evan Williams
90. Gerald Williams
91. Howie Williams
92. Jamaal Williams
93. K. D. Williams
94. Kevin Williams
95. Mark Williams
96. Perry Williams
97. Savion Williams
98. Tim Williams
99. Tramon Williams ‡
100. Travis Williams ‡
101. Tyrone Williams
102. Walter Williams
103. Matt Willig
104. James Willis
105. Malik Willis
106. Jeff Wilner
107. Ben Wilson
108. C. J. Wilson
109. Charles Wilson
110. Emanuel Wilson
111. Eric Wilson
112. Mule Wilson
113. Gene Wilson
114. Marcus Wilson
115. Milt Wilson
116. Ray Wilson
117. Abner Wimberly
118. Juwann Winfree
119. Blake Wingle
120. Rich Wingo
121. Francis Winkler
122. Randy Winkler
123. Billy Winn
124. Paul Winslow
125. Blaise Winter
126. Chet Winters
127. Frank Winters ‡
128. Wimpy Winther
129. Steven Wirtel
130. Jerron Wishom
131. Jerry Wisne
132. Cal Withrow
133. Earl Witte
134. Alex Wizbicki
135. Bobby Wood
136. Willie Wood † ‡
137. Colby Wooden
138. Whitey Woodin ‡
139. Jerry Woods
140. Keith Woodside
141. Charles Woodson † ‡
142. Vince Workman
143. Jerel Worthy
144. Keith Wortman
145. Steve Wright
146. Randy Wright
147. Danny Wuerffel
148. Harry Wunsch
149. Devonte Wyatt
150. DeShawn Wynn
151. Jarius Wynn

== X ==
- None

== Y ==
1. Isaac Yiadom
2. Billy Young
3. Glenn Young
4. Paul Young

== Z ==
1. Gust Zarnas
2. Roger Zatkoff
3. Joe Zeller
4. Max Zendejas
5. Lance Zeno
6. Don Zimmerman
7. Carl Zoll
8. Dick Zoll
9. Martin Zoll
10. Frank Zombo
11. Jim Zorn
12. Dave Zuidmulder
13. Al Zupek
14. Merle Zuver

== See also ==
- Lists of Green Bay Packers players
