= 1987 Green Bay Packers season =

NFL team season

- General manager: Tom Braatz
- Head coach: Forrest Gregg
- Home stadium: Lambeau Field; Milwaukee County Stadium

Results
- Record: 5–9–1
- Division place: 3rd NFC Central
- Playoffs: Did not qualify
- Pro Bowlers: None

The 1987 Green Bay Packers season was their 69th season overall and their 67th in the National Football League. They went 5–9–1 under coach Forrest Gregg to place 3rd in the NFC Central, improving on their 4–12 record from 1986 by only 1.75 wins. The Packers suffered their second consecutive losing season, their fifth consecutive non-winning season, and failed to qualify for the playoffs for the fifth consecutive season.

The 1987 NFL season was marked by a 24-day players strike, reducing the number of games from 16 games to 15. Three games of the Packers’ season were played with replacement players, going 2–1.

The season ended with coach Forrest Gregg announcing he was leaving to fill the head coaching position at his alma mater, Southern Methodist University.

== Offseason ==
=== Draft ===
1987 Green Bay Packers draft
Round	Pick	Player	Position	College	Notes
1	4	Brent Fullwood *	RB	Auburn	
2	41	Johnny Holland	LB	Texas A&M	
3	61	Dave Croston	OT	Iowa	from Atlanta
3	69	Scott Stephen	LB	Arizona St	from L. A. Radiers
3	71	Frankie Neal	WR	Fort Hays St	from Cleveland
4	89	Lorenzo Freeman	DT	Pittsburgh	
6	145	Willie Marshall	WR	Temple	
7	172	Tony Leiker	DT	Stanford	
7	191	Bill Smith	P	Ole Miss	
8	198	Jeff Drost	DT	Iowa	
9	228	Greg Harris	OG	Wake Forest	
10	255	Don Majkowski *	QB	Virginia	
11	282	Patrick Scott	WR	Grambling	
12	335	Norman Jefferson	CB	LSU	
Made roster † Pro Football Hall of Fame * Made at least one Pro Bowl during career

=== Undrafted free agents ===
1987 undrafted free agents of note
Player	Position	College
Todd Auer	Linebacker	Western Illinois
Vincent Barnett	Cornerback	Arkansas State
David Caldwell	Defensive tackle	TCU
John Diettrich	Kicker	Ball State
Tony Elliott	Safety	Central Michigan
Anthony Harrison	Safety	Georgia Tech
Jim Hobbins	Guard	Minnesota
Craig Jay	Tight end	Mount Senario
Jon Kleinschmidt	Punter	Wisconsin–Stevens Point
Ed Konopasek	Offensive tackle	Ball State
Chris Mandeville	Safety	UC Davis
Aaron Manning	Cornerback	Iowa State
John McGarry	Guard	Saint Joseph's
W. C. Nix	Center	TCU
Keith Paskett	Wide Receiver	Western Kentucky
Rorery Perryman	Defensive end	Boston College
Martin Rudolph	Cornerback	Arizona
John Sterling	Running back	Central Oklahoma
Terry Steelhammer	Offensive tackle	Texas
Jeff Valder	Kicker	Arizona
Chuck Washington	Cornerback	Arkansas
Kevin Willhite	Running Back	Oregon
Dave Yarema	Quarterback	Michigan State

== Personnel ==
=== Staff ===
1987 Green Bay Packers staff
Front office: President – Robert J. Parins; Corporate Assistant to the President – Bob Harlan; Executive vice-president of football operations – Tom Braatz; Director of college scouting – Dick Corrick; Head coaches: Head coach – Forrest Gregg; Offensive coaches: Quarterbacks – George Sefcik; Offensive backs – Willie Peete; Receivers/passing game – Tom Coughlin; Offensive line – Virgil Knight; Offensive line – Jerry Wampfler	Defensive coaches: Defensive coordinator/Defensive Line – Dick Modzelewski; Linebackers – Dale Lindsey; Defensive backs – Dick Jauron; Special teams coaches: Special teams – Willie Peete; Strength and conditioning: Strength and conditioning – Virgil Knight

=== NFL replacement players ===
After the league decided to use replacement players during the NFLPA strike, the following team was assembled:

1987 Green Bay Packers replacement roster
Quarterbacks: 5 Willie Gillus; 11 Alan Risher; Running backs: 20 Jimmy Hargrove; 31 Tony Hunter; 43 Larry Morris; 39 Freddie Parker; 33 John Sterling; 45 Lavale Thomas; 25 Lee Weigel; 35 Kevin Willhite; Wide receivers: 82 Derrick Harden; 48-85 Lee Morris; 87 Cornelius Redick; 83 Patrick Scott; 84 Wes Smith; Tight ends: 26-81 Craig Jay; 89 Kevin Fitzgerald; 86 Don Summers	Offensive linemen: 70-74-92 Steve Collier; 79 Mike Estep; 69 Bob Gruber; 63 Perry Hartnett; 78 Jim Hobbins; 60/54 Greg Jensen; 68 Ed Konopasek; 61 John McGarry; 62 Jim Meyer; 50 Vince Rafferty; 67 Travis Simpson; Defensive linemen: 72 Warren Bone; 73 David Caldwell; 71 Jeff Drost; 96 Tony Leiker DE; 94 Stan Mataele; 77 Sylvester McGrew; 95 Carl Sullivan; 93 Calvin Wallace; 64 Vince Villanucci	Linebackers: 53 Aric Anderson; 72-98 Todd Auer; 57 Putt Choate; 55 Ken Jordan; 52 James Melka; 97 John Miller; 60/54 Rydell Melancon; 51 Ron Monaco; 56 John Pointer; Defensive backs: 41 Chuck Compton; 27 Tony F. Elliott; 46 Anthony Harrison; 40 David King; 44 Von Mansfield; 34 Lou Rash; 38/18 Chuck Washington; Special teams: 13 Bill Renner P; 8 Max Zendejas K

=== Roster ===
1987 Green Bay Packers roster
Quarterbacks: 5 Don Majkowski; 16 Randy Wright; Running backs: 30 Paul Ott Carruth; 33 Jessie Clark; 20 Kelly Cook; 36 Kenneth Davis; 21 Brent Fullwood; Wide receivers: 85 Phil Epps; 81 Lee Morris; 80 Frankie Neal; 82 Keith Paskett; 83 Patrick Scott; 87 Walter Stanley; Tight ends: 89 Joey Hackett; 86 Ed West	Offensive linemen: 58 Mark Cannon C; 69 Bill Cherry C; 64 Steve Collier RT; 65 Ron Hallstrom G; 57 Rich Moran G; 72 Tom Neville G; 77 Tommy Robison G; 75 Ken Ruettgers LT; 70 Keith Uecker RT; 73 Alan Veingrad LT; Defensive linemen: 61 Jerry Boyarsky NT; 93 Robert Brown DE; 79 Ross Browner NT; 76 Alphonso Carreker DE; 90 Ezra Johnson DE	Linebackers: 59 John Anderson OLB; 56 Burnell Dent ILB; 99 John Dorsey ILB; 97 Tim Harris OLB; 50 Johnny Holland ILB; 98 Brent Moore OLB; 91 Brian Noble ILB; 54 Scott Stephen OLB; 52 Mike Weddington OLB; 51 Clayton Weishuhn ILB; Defensive backs: 32 Dave Brown CB; 23 Tiger Greene FS; 38 Norman Jefferson CB; 39 Kenneth Johnson CB; 22 Mark Lee CB; 44 Chris Mandeville SS; 37 Mark Murphy SS; 29 Ken Stills FS; Special teams: 17 Don Bracken P; 8 Max Zendejas K	Reserve lists: 6 Robbie Bosco QB (IR); 60 Dave Croston LT (IR); 71 Jeff Drost DE (IR); 27 Tony Elliott S (IR); 49 David Greenwood S (IR); 63 Greg Harris C (IR); 40 Eddie Lee Ivery RB (IR); -- Don King S (IR); 53 Bobby Leopold ILB (IR); 67 David Logan NT (Retired); 88 Willie Marshall WR (IR); 47 Jim Bob Morris S (IR); -- Don Summers TE (IR); 92 Ben Thomas DE (IR); 45 Lavale Thomas RB (IR); 28 Elbert Watts CB (IR); 35 Kevin Willhite RB (IR); Rookies in italics

== Regular season ==
=== Schedule ===
Week	Date	Opponent	Result	Record	Venue	Attendance
1	September 13	Los Angeles Raiders	**L** 0–20	0–1	Lambeau Field	54,983
2	September 20	Denver Broncos	**T** 17–17 (OT)	0–1–1	Milwaukee County Stadium	50,624
3	September 27	at **Tampa Bay Buccaneers**	Game not held due to 1987 NFL strike			
4	October 4	at **Minnesota Vikings**	**W** 23–16*	1–1–1	Hubert H. Humphrey Metrodome	13,911
5	October 11	**Detroit Lions**	**L** 16–19* (OT)	1–2–1	Lambeau Field	35,779
6	October 18	Philadelphia Eagles	**W** 16–10* (OT)	2–2–1	Lambeau Field	35,842
7	October 25	at **Detroit Lions**	**W** 34–33	3–2–1	Pontiac Silverdome	27,278
8	November 1	**Tampa Bay Buccaneers**	**L** 17–23	3–3–1	Milwaukee County Stadium	50,308
9	November 8	**Chicago Bears**	**L** 24–26	3–4–1	Lambeau Field	53,320
10	November 15	at Seattle Seahawks	**L** 13–24	3–5–1	Kingdome	60,963
11	November 22	at Kansas City Chiefs	**W** 23–3	4–5–1	Arrowhead Stadium	34,611
12	November 29	at **Chicago Bears**	**L** 10–23	4–6–1	Soldier Field	61,638
13	December 6	San Francisco 49ers	**L** 12–23	4–7–1	Lambeau Field	51,118
14	December 13	**Minnesota Vikings**	**W** 16–10	5–7–1	Milwaukee County Stadium	47,059
15	December 19	at New York Giants	**L** 10–20	5–8–1	Giants Stadium	51,013
16	December 27	at New Orleans Saints	**L** 24–33	5–9–1	Louisiana Superdome	68,364

Note: Intra-division opponents are in bold text.

=== Game summaries ===
==== Week 3 ====
Team	1	2	3	4	Total
• Packers	7	13	0	3	23
Vikings	0	7	7	2	16

- Date: October 4
- Location: Hubert H. Humphrey Metrodome, Minneapolis, Minnesota
- Game start: 4:00 p.m. EST
- Game weather: Indoors (dome)
- Referee: Pat Haggerty

Scoring summary
Q1	GB	Thomas 30 yard pass from Risher (Zendejas kick)	GB 7–0
Q2	GB	Zendejas 35 yard field goal	GB 10–0
Q2	GB	Zendejas 43 yard field goal	GB 13–0
Q2	MIN	Brim 63 yard pass from Adams (Dawson kick)	GB 13–7
Q2	GB	Risher 13 yard run (Zendejas kick)	GB 20–7
Q3	MIN	Brim 38 yard run (Dawson kick)	GB 20–14
Q4	MIN	Safety, Stepanek tackled Risher in end zone	GB 20–16
Q4	GB	Zendejas 34 yard field goal	GB 23–16

=== Standings ===
NFC Central
	W	L	T	PCT	DIV	CONF	PF	PA	STK
^{(2)} Chicago Bears	11	4	0	.733	7–0	9–2	356	282	W1
^{(5)} Minnesota Vikings	8	7	0	.533	3–5	6–6	336	335	L1
Green Bay Packers	5	9	1	.367	3–4	4–7	255	300	L2
Tampa Bay Buccaneers	4	11	0	.267	3–4	4–9	286	360	L8
Detroit Lions	4	11	0	.267	2–5	4–7	269	384	W1

== Statistical leaders ==
Quarterbacks
Player	Attempts	Completions	Yards	Touchdowns	Interceptions	QB rating
Randy Wright	247	142	1,507	6	11	61.6
Don Majkowski	127	55	875	5	3	70.2

Running Backs
Player	Rushes	Yards	Average	Touchdowns
Kenneth Davis	109	413	3.8	3
Brent Fullwood	84	274	3.3	5

Receivers
Player	Receptions	Yards	Average	Touchdowns
Walter Stanley	38	672	17.7	3
Frankie Neal	36	420	11.7	3
Phil Epps	34	516	15.2	2

== Awards and milestones ==
=== Hall of Famers ===
- The following were inducted into the Green Bay Packers Hall of Fame in February 1987;
- Chester Marcol, K, 1972–80
- Deral Teteak, LB-G, 1952–56
