= Finney High School =

School in Detroit, Michigan, United States of America

Coordinates: 42°24′28.9″N 82°55′44.3″W

Jared W. Finney High School was a public comprehensive high school in northeastern Detroit, Michigan, United States. Located at 17200 Southampton, it was a part of Detroit Public Schools, and was in proximity to the Grosse Pointes.

== History ==
The school first opened as an elementary school in 1928. It became a high school in 1962.

Finney received a $2.5 million bond investment prior to its closure in 2009. The original plan was to rebuild the school in a new $75 million campus on the same site shared with McNair Pre-K-8, but those plans changed. In 2012, Finney and Crockett High School merged into East English Village Preparatory Academy, which was built on the former site of Finney.

The school was named after Detroiter Jared Warner Finney, a United States Commissioner and U.S. Attorney, in honor of his wide-ranging contributions to the City of Detroit. He was one of two sole members of the first graduating class of Detroit High School in 1861. Jared's father, Seymour Finney, was a prominent conductor on Detroit's underground railroad and owned "Finney's Barn," near Griswold and State streets, where the family hid former slaves and helped ferry them to freedom in Canada.

== Notable alumni ==
- Gus Calandrino, Mayor, City of Utica, MI
- Tony Elliott, professional football player

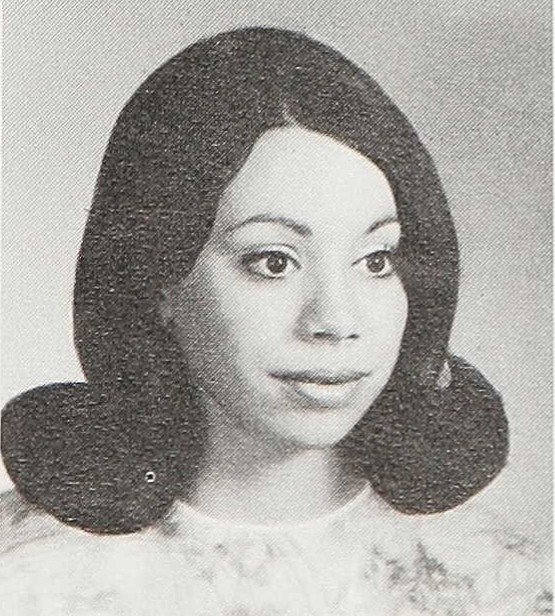
Maria Ewing

- Maria Ewing, opera singer
- Jermaine Jackson, basketball player
