= Perry Hartnett =

American football player (born 1960)

No. 71, 67, 62, 63
- Position: Guard

Personal information
- Born: April 28, 1960 (age 66); Galveston, Texas, U.S.
- Listed height: 6 ft 5 in (1.96 m)
- Listed weight: 278 lb (126 kg)

Career information
- High school: Ball (Galveston)
- College: SMU (1978–1981)
- NFL draft: 1982: 5th round, 116th overall pick

Career history
- Chicago Bears (1982–1983); Chicago Blitz (1984); Baltimore Stars (1985)*; Buffalo Bills (1985)*; Green Bay Packers (1987)
- * Offseason or practice squad member only

Career NFL statistics
- Games played: 12
- Games started: 5
- Stats at Pro Football Reference

Perry Edmond Hartnett (born April 28, 1960) is an American former professional football player who was a guard in the National Football League (NFL) and United States Football League (USFL). He played college football for the SMU Mustangs. He was a member of the Chicago Bears, Buffalo Bills and Green Bay Packers in the NFL, while being with the Chicago Blitz and Baltimore Stars in the USFL. Hartnett played 12 NFL games, five as a starter, in addition to 16 USFL games in his career.

== Early life ==
Hartnett was born on April 28, 1960, in Galveston, Texas. He attended Ball High School in Galveston; he was the ninth alumni of the school to play in the NFL. He became a starter for the football team at tackle as a sophomore. He reportedly appeared to have little hope of continuing his football career as a junior, weighing only 218 pounds (99 kg), but increased in size to 265 pounds (120 kg) as a senior and began receiving attention. The magazine Dave Campbell's Texas Football named him the top lineman in the state in an article previewing the 1977 season, Hartnett's senior year, and at the end of the season, he was selected Adidas All-American, All-District, and honorable mention All-American by National High School Athletic Coaches. He committed to play college football for the SMU Mustangs.

== College career ==
Hartnett married his wife, Donna, the day before football practice began in his freshman year at Southern Methodist University (SMU). He did not play his first year, 1978, and nearly quit as a sophomore in 1979, but his wife convinced him to stay. He started his first game on the offensive line mid-season that year and saw more starting action as a junior in 1980. As a senior in 1981, he helped them finish with a 10–1 record and No. 6 ranking while being named first-team All-Southwest Conference (SWC).

== Professional career ==
Hartnett was selected in the fifth round (116th overall) of the 1982 NFL draft by the Chicago Bears. He signed his rookie contract on June 16. He made his NFL debut in Week 1 against the Detroit Lions and appeared in all nine games during the strike-shortened 1982 season, posting four starts while playing guard. He lost his starting job in the 1983 training camp and was released. He was then signed again, appeared in two games as a backup, and was released again.

In November 1983, Hartnett signed with the Chicago Blitz of the United States Football League (USFL) following his release by the Bears. He played 16 of 18 games for the Blitz in the 1984 season as they went 5–13. He joined the Baltimore Stars for the 1985 season but did not make the team.

Following his USFL stints, Hartnett returned to the NFL by signing with the Buffalo Bills in May 1985. He was waived on July 31 that year. He then joined the Green Bay Packers, but was released on August 19. Hartnett remained out of football afterwards until re-joining the Packers in October 1987, as a replacement player during the National Football League Players Association strike. He played in their loss against the Detroit Lions and was injured in the game; he himself had been a replacement for the injured replacement player John McGarry. He was released at the end of the strike and never played professionally again. Hartnett ended his career with 12 games played, five as a starter, in the NFL, in addition to his 16 USFL games.
