= Travis Simpson =

American football player (born 1963)

No. 67
- Position: Center

Personal information
- Born: November 19, 1963 (age 62); Norman, Oklahoma, U.S.
- Listed height: 6 ft 3 in (1.91 m)
- Listed weight: 272 lb (123 kg)

Career information
- High school: Norman
- College: Oklahoma (1983–1986)
- NFL draft: 1987: undrafted

Career history
- Indianapolis Colts (1987)*; Green Bay Packers (1987); Miami Dolphins (1988–1989)*
- * Offseason or practice squad member only

Awards and highlights
- National champion (1985); Second-team All-Big Eight (1986)

Career NFL statistics
- Games played: 3
- Stats at Pro Football Reference

Travis Simpson (born November 19, 1963) is an American former professional football player who was a center for one season with the Green Bay Packers of the National Football League (NFL). He played college football for the Oklahoma Sooners. Also a member of the Indianapolis Colts and Miami Dolphins, he spent a total of three years in the NFL although he only saw playing time in one.

== Biography ==
Simpson was born on November 19, 1963, in Norman, Oklahoma. He grew up an Oklahoma Sooners fan, having "first pulled on a Sooner football helmet" at age seven, after receiving one from Oklahoma assistant coach Warren Harper. He attended Norman High School and was the school's fourth alumnus to play in the NFL. At Norman, he played football and was a multi-year starter at both center and linebacker, being an All-State performer. He signed to play college football for the Oklahoma Sooners.

== College career ==
Simpson lettered at the University of Oklahoma as a freshman in 1983, serving as a second-string center. After remaining a backup during the 1984 season, he became a starter in 1985 following an injury to Paul Ferrer. However, he battled injuries that year, starting with a hyperextended elbow against Minnesota. Injuries later resulted in him missing games against Texas and Miami, and an ankle injury ended his season at the start of December. The 1985 Sooners compiled an 11–1 record, winning the Big Eight Conference championship and the national championship.

Simpson remained a starter for his senior season but his ankle injury from the previous year was described as "severe" and resulted in his 40-yard dash time dropping from 4.6-seconds to 5.0-seconds. In his last year at Oklahoma, he was the only senior starting on the offensive line, helping the team compile another 11–1 record while winning the Big Eight championship and the 1987 Orange Bowl. Simpson was selected to the Big Eight All-Academic team and second-team All-Big Eight. He was also named honorable mention All-American by the Associated Press.

== Professional career ==
Following the 1987 NFL draft, Simpson signed with the Indianapolis Colts as an undrafted free agent. He was released on August 31, 1987. In September, the NFL Players Association went on strike and each team assembled rosters of replacement players; Simpson signed to be a replacement player with the Green Bay Packers on September 23. He made his NFL debut in Week 4 against the Minnesota Vikings and ended up playing in all three strike games as a backup center, before being released on October 19, at the end of the strike. Simpson signed with the Miami Dolphins on March 23, 1988, to play guard. He was released on August 28, 1988. He later returned to the Dolphins, being signed on August 2, 1989, only to be released on August 21, marking the end of his professional career. He finished his NFL career with three games played, all as a backup.
