= Lee Morris (American football) =

American football player (born 1964)

No. 48, 85, 86
- Position: Wide receiver

Personal information
- Born: July 14, 1964 (age 62); Oklahoma City, Oklahoma, U.S.
- Listed height: 5 ft 11 in (1.80 m)
- Listed weight: 180 lb (82 kg)

Career information
- High school: Del City (Del City, Oklahoma)
- College: Oklahoma
- NFL draft: 1987: undrafted

Career history
- Green Bay Packers (1987); Toronto Argonauts (1988–1989); Hamilton Tiger-Cats (1990); San Antonio Riders (1991-1992)

Awards and highlights
- National champion (1985)

Career NFL statistics
- Receptions: 16
- Receiving yards: 259
- Touchdowns: 1
- Stats at Pro Football Reference

Lee Morris (born July 14, 1964) is an American former professional football player who was a wide receiver in the National Football League (NFL) and Canadian Football League (CFL). After playing college football for the Oklahoma Sooners, he played in the NFL for the Green Bay Packers in 1987.
