= Rex Smith (American football) =

American football player (1896–1972)

Profile
- Position: End

Personal information
- Born: March 8, 1896; Rushford, Minnesota, U.S.
- Died: January 18, 1972 (aged 75)
- Listed height: 6 ft 0 in (1.83 m)
- Listed weight: 195 lb (88 kg)

Career information
- High school: Rushford (MN)
- College: La Crosse State (1915–1916); Beloit (1917–1918)

Career history
- Green Bay Packers (1922)

Career statistics
- Games played: 2
- Stats at Pro Football Reference

Matthew Everett "Rex" Smith (March 8, 1896 – January 18, 1972) was an American professional football end who played one season in the National Football League (NFL) for the Green Bay Packers. He played college football at La Crosse State Normal School (now the University of Wisconsin–La Crosse) and Beloit College, attending each school for two years. After college, Smith appeared in two games for the Packers during the 1922 NFL season.

== Early life and college career ==
Smith was born on March 8, 1896, in Rushford, Minnesota. He attended Rushford High School and is one of only two athletes from the school to ever to play in the NFL. After high school, Smith enrolled at La Crosse State Normal School (now known as the University of Wisconsin–La Crosse) in 1915, pursuing a course of study in physical education. He attended La Crosse for two years. There, Smith joined the football team but was not able to make the starting lineup. He led the second team as a quarterback and end during the 1915 and 1916 seasons.

While at La Crosse, Smith received military training. He applied for the first reserve officers' training camp in May 1917 and attended an examination in Minneapolis. He was placed on a reserve list of eligible candidates for the camp but due to his eyesight he was never called up to active duty. In the fall of 1917, Smith enrolled at Beloit College and tried out for the football team. He made the team as an end and won a starting role. Although he was reported to be one of the lightest players on the team, he was a "strong and reliable player", according to the Beloit Daily News. The La Crosse Tribune noted that he "put up a good fight" and "made some brilliant plays" in Beloit's game against the Wisconsin Badgers, reporting that his play "seemed to indicate that the La Crosse normal mentors passed up a star in allowing the Minnesotan to remain on the seconds during his stay in La Crosse." He graduated from Beloit as part of the class of 1919. Smith was a member of the Beta Theta Pi fraternity.

== Professional career ==
According to the Green Bay Press-Gazette, Smith was a member of the Canton Bulldogs of the NFL in 1921 as an end. However, he is not known to have appeared in any games for them. At the start of October 1922, he signed with the Green Bay Packers and reported to the team on October 5. The Press-Gazette described him as a "big six footer weighing about 200 pounds (91 kg) and [he] has a national reputation as a gridder." Smith appeared in two games for the Packers as a backup end, while the team compiled a record of 4–3–3 and placed seventh in the NFL. He became Beloit's first NFL player and one of the first two from La Crosse. He did not play for any other NFL team after the 1922 season.

== Later life and death ==
Smith studied further at Vanderbilt University's Peabody College in Nashville, Tennessee, and Columbia University in New York after his football career. He married Laurie Helen Mayer in July 1929 and later served on the faculty at a high school in Great Neck, New York. Smith died on January 18, 1972, at the age of 75.
