= Mike Estep (American football) =

English gridiron football player (born 1963)

No. 77, 79
- Position: Tackle / guard

Personal information
- Born: December 29, 1963 (age 62); Northampton, England
- Listed height: 6 ft 4 in (1.93 m)
- Listed weight: 270 lb (122 kg)

Career information
- High school: Newark (OH)
- College: Bowling Green (1982–1986)
- NFL draft: 1987: undrafted

Career history
- New York Jets (1987)*; Green Bay Packers (1987); Buffalo Bills (1987)
- * Offseason or practice squad member only
- Stats at Pro Football Reference

Michael Lawrence Estep (born December 29, 1963) is an English-born American former professional football player who was a tackle and guard for one season in the National Football League (NFL) for the Buffalo Bills and Green Bay Packers. He played college football for the Bowling Green Falcons, where he was a two-time first-team All-Mid-American Conference (MAC) selection, and appeared in three games in the NFL as a replacement player during the 1987 NFL strike.

== Early life ==
Estep was born on December 29, 1963, in Northampton, England, and later moved to the U.S., where he attended Newark High School. At Newark, he competed in football, basketball, and track and field. In football, he played as a guard and defensive end. As a senior, he helped Newark compile a 7–3 record while leading the team in tackles, fumble recoveries and sacks. He was named first-team All-Ohio, All-Class AAA and the Central Ohio League lineman of the year for his performance. He committed to play college football for the Bowling Green Falcons.

== College career ==
Estep enrolled at Bowling Green in 1982. Initially a defensive end and outside linebacker, he redshirted as a freshman and then, as a sophomore in 1983, switched to playing as an offensive lineman. He received a varsity letter four years at Bowling Green. Known for his aggressiveness, he was nicknamed "The Terminator" after the film starring Arnold Schwarzenegger. The Daily Sentinel-Tribune described him as someone who "wouldn't hurt a fly", but noted he was completely different on the field. Estep said that "I like to hit people ... When I pull I like to level somebody. And in pass protection, when a linebacker or someone is blitzing, I like to get a good shot on him. After one or two of those, he doesn't want to blitz."

In 1985, Estep was named first-team All-Mid-American Conference (MAC) as well as an honorable mention All-American. He was also named to an All-American team composed of players from the Phi Delta Theta fraternity. As a senior in 1986, he repeated as a first-team All-MAC selection.

== Professional career ==
After going unselected in the 1987 NFL draft, Estep signed with the New York Jets as an undrafted free agent. Increasing his weight to 285 pounds (129 kg) when he joined the Jets, he was reported to be among their top performers on the bench press and was asked to play right guard. However, he ended up being waived at the start of August 1987. Later, in October, NFL players went on strike, and as a result, teams signed replacement players. Estep signed to play for the Green Bay Packers as a replacement and saw action in their first strike game against the Minnesota Vikings. He was waived after his first game with the Packers, but was then claimed off waivers by the Buffalo Bills the following day. He appeared in the Bills' next two games, against the New England Patriots and New York Giants, and was tasked with blocking future Pro Football Hall of Famer Lawrence Taylor against the Giants. In the strike games, Estep appeared as a guard and tackle. At the end of the strike the following week, Estep and most other replacement players were released. He told The Newark Advocate that his three-game stint in professional football gave him the money that allowed him to finish school, pay off his bills and make "a pretty good down payment on a new car."

After his football career, Estep worked as a salesman for Mathews Ford.
