= Steve Collier =

American football player (born 1963)

No. 64, 70, 74, 92
- Position: Offensive tackle

Personal information
- Born: April 19, 1963 (age 63); Chicago, Illinois, U.S.
- Listed height: 6 ft 7 in (2.01 m)
- Listed weight: 342 lb (155 kg)

Career information
- High school: Chicago (IL) Whitney Young
- College: Bethune–Cookman
- NFL draft: 1985: undrafted

Career history
- Cleveland Browns (1985)*; San Diego Chargers (1986)*; Green Bay Packers (1987–1988); New York Jets (1989)*
- * Offseason or practice squad member only

Career NFL statistics
- Games played: 10
- Games started: 6
- Stats at Pro Football Reference

Steve Collier (born April 19, 1963) is a former offensive tackle in the National Football League (NFL).

== Biography ==
Collier was born in Chicago, Illinois.

== College career ==
He played at the collegiate level at Bethune–Cookman University and the University of Illinois at Urbana-Champaign.

== Professional career ==
=== Cleveland Browns ===
In 1985, Collier originally signed with the Cleveland Browns of the National Football League as a defensive end, but was converted to an offensive tackle in training camp. On August 21, 1985, he was cut by the Browns.

=== San Diego Chargers ===
On April 14, 1986, Collier signed with the San Diego Chargers of the National Football League, but was released on July 19, 1986.

=== Green Bay Packers ===
The Green Bay Packers signed Collier as a replacement during the 1987 players' strike and was retained after the strike. During the 1987 season he played in 10 games. The following year, he injured his knee in training camp and spent the 1988 season on injured reserve, with the exception of the final game in which he was on the roster but did not play. He has the distinction of wearing four different jersey numbers during his time with the Packers, they include numbers: 64, 70, 74, and 92.

=== New York Jets ===
On March 8, 1989, Collier would sign with the New York Jets of the National Football League after being left unprotected by the Packers following their 1988 season. The Jets released him on August 8, 1989.
