= Sylvester McGrew =

American football player (born 1960)

No. 77
- Position: Defensive end

Personal information
- Born: February 27, 1960 (age 66); New Orleans, Louisiana, U.S.
- Listed height: 6 ft 4 in (1.93 m)
- Listed weight: 257 lb (117 kg)

Career information
- High school: West Jefferson (Harvey, Louisiana)
- College: Tulane (1978–1981)
- NFL draft: 1982: undrafted

Career history
- New York Giants (1982–1983)*; New Orleans Breakers (1984)*; Green Bay Packers (1986–1987)
- * Offseason or practice squad member only

Career NFL statistics
- Games played: 3
- Stats at Pro Football Reference

Sylvester Lee McGrew Sr. (born February 27, 1960) is an American former professional football player who was a defensive end for one season with the Green Bay Packers of the National Football League (NFL). He played college football for the Tulane Green Wave.

== Early life ==
McGrew was born on February 27, 1960, in New Orleans, Louisiana. Also known by the name "Sly," he attended West Jefferson High School in Harvey, Louisiana, and was their fifth alumnus in the NFL. At West Jefferson, McGrew played football as a defensive end and was one of the best at his position in the area. He was named all-district as a junior and then as a senior was chosen all-district, the district defensive MVP, all-New Orleans and first-team all-state class AAAA.

== College career ==
McGrew enrolled at Tulane University in New Orleans in 1978. He saw playing time as a freshman for the Tulane Green Wave football team, including against Memphis State where he had three sacks and a fumble recovery. He converted to defensive tackle at Tulane. A part-time starter beginning as a sophomore and later a full-time starter, he totaled 72 tackles as a junior in 1980 and then moved to linebacker in 1981. He graduated following the 1981 season, having been a four-year letterman with the Green Wave.

== Professional career ==
Although projected by some to be chosen in the 1982 NFL draft, McGrew was not selected and subsequently signed with the New York Giants as an undrafted free agent. In August, he injured his knee during a practice. He underwent arthroscopic knee surgery for torn cartilage and although initially projected to miss two weeks, he was placed on the season-ending injured reserve list on August 16. He returned to the Giants for the 1983 season. In April 1983, he was a member of a basketball team composed of Giants that played an exhibition for charity against a team of former New Jersey Nets players. He was released prior to the 1983 regular season, on August 9, 1983.

McGrew signed with the New Orleans Breakers of the United States Football League (USFL) to play linebacker in 1984, but was released in January that year, prior to the start of the regular season. After then being out of football for a year, McGrew signed as a free agent with the Green Bay Packers in July 1986, to play defensive end. He was hospitalized with an infection at the start of August. He was later released by the Packers on August 18, 1986.

After the NFL Players Association went on strike in 1987, each team assembled rosters of replacement players, and McGrew was signed on September 23, 1987, to be a backup defensive end for the Packers. Prior to joining the Packers, he was set to become a teacher in Louisiana. He made his NFL debut in the team's Week 4 game against the Minnesota Vikings, and then appeared in the other two strike games, a loss to the Detroit Lions in Week 5 and a win over the Philadelphia Eagles in Week 6, before being released with the majority of the other replacement players when the strike ended, on October 19, 1987. He was a starter for the Packers in two of the games. After being released, he was quoted in The Journal Times, saying of the replacements that "I think we have enough financially to find what direction we can go in – And if you put on your résumé that you were a player for the Green Bay Packers, 'B' team or not, it's got to help".

== Personal life ==
McGrew had a son, Sylvester Jr., whose birth he learned of through a phone call while at training camp with the Giants in 1983. Sylvester Jr. followed in the footsteps of his father, playing college football as a defensive end for the Miami Hurricanes.
