= Ed Konopasek =

American football player (born 1964)

No. 68
- Position: Tackle

Personal information
- Born: April 12, 1964 (age 62); Gary, Indiana, U.S.
- Listed height: 6 ft 6 in (1.98 m)
- Listed weight: 289 lb (131 kg)

Career information
- High school: Griffith (Griffith, Indiana)
- College: Ball State (1982–1986)
- NFL draft: 1987: undrafted

Career history
- Green Bay Packers (1987)

Career NFL statistics
- Games played: 3
- Games started: 3
- Stats at Pro Football Reference

Edward Steven Konopasek (born April 12, 1964) is an American former professional football player who was an offensive tackle for the Green Bay Packers of the National Football League (NFL). A replacement player during the 1987 NFL strike, he played three games for the Packers. He played college football for the Ball State Cardinals.

== Early life and education ==
Konopasek was born on April 12, 1964, in Gary, Indiana. He attended Griffith High School in Griffith, Indiana, and is their only alumnus to play in the NFL. He played football and basketball at Griffith, being a lineman in the former while a center in the latter. In football, he was a three-year starter and played two-ways for his last two seasons, leading the team in tackles and posting 10 sacks as a senior while being named first-team all-state on defense. He helped the team compile a record of 11–1 in his last year and was invited to the North–South All-Star Game.

Konopasek began attending Ball State University after his graduation from Griffith in 1982 and was a member of the scout team that year. He joined fellow Griffith graduate Mike Willis at Ball State, and both studied computer science there. He began his collegiate career as a defensive tackle and lettered in 1983 while playing every game. He repeated as a letterman in 1984 while switching to offensive tackle, being a full-time starter and again appearing in every game while being named honorable mention academic all-conference.

Konopasek was named co-team captain and continued as a full-time starter in the 1985 season, starting all 11 games and extending his streak to 33 consecutive games played. He was selected first-team academic all-conference after the year. He was again co-team captain as a senior in 1986 but missed playing time due to an offseason foot injury. He finished his senior year with six games played and was named for the second time first-team academic all-conference with a 3.097 grade point average (GPA). He was also given the Ball State football academic award.

== Professional career ==
After going unselected in the 1987 NFL draft, Konopasek was signed by the Green Bay Packers as an undrafted free agent. He was released on August 17 but was later brought back to the team as a replacement player during the NFL Players Association strike. He made his NFL debut in Week 4 against the Minnesota Vikings and started all three strike games at tackle for the Packers before being released at the end of the strike.

== Personal life ==
Konopasek's brother Ken played college football as a wide receiver for the William Penn Statesmen.
