= Ron Monaco =

American football player (born 1963)

No. 59, 51
- Position: Linebacker

Personal information
- Born: May 3, 1963 (age 63); New Haven, Connecticut, U.S.
- Listed height: 6 ft 1 in (1.85 m)
- Listed weight: 225 lb (102 kg)

Career information
- High school: Hamden (Hamden, Connecticut)
- College: San Diego State (1981); Vanderbilt (1982); Northwest Mississippi (1983); South Carolina (1984–1985)
- NFL draft: 1986: undrafted

Career history
- St. Louis Cardinals (1986–1987); Green Bay Packers (1987); Kansas City Chiefs (1988)*
- * Offseason or practice squad member only

Career NFL statistics
- Games played: 17
- Games started: 3
- Fumbles recovered: 1
- Stats at Pro Football Reference

Ronnie Carl Monaco (born May 3, 1963) is an American former professional football player who was a linebacker for two seasons in the National Football League (NFL). He played college football for the San Diego State Aztecs, Vanderbilt Commodores, Northwest Mississippi Rangers and South Carolina Gamecocks. He saw limited action in college but nonetheless was able to sign with the NFL's St. Louis Cardinals and made the team in 1986. He later spent time with the Green Bay Packers and Kansas City Chiefs.

== Early life ==
Monaco was born on May 3, 1963, in New Haven, Connecticut. He was brothers with NFL center Rob Monaco. He played quarterback for his junior high school's football team, then switched to playing tight end and linebacker in order to be a starter for the team at Hamden High School. As a senior at Hamden, he played fullback, but had to stop due to developing shin splints. He played with his brother at Hamden and is one of seven of their alumni to make it to the NFL.

== College career ==
Monaco began his collegiate career with the San Diego State Aztecs in 1981, lettering while being a backup inside linebacker that year. He transferred to play for the Vanderbilt Commodores in 1982, joining his brother Rob. In 1983, he transferred again to Northwest Mississippi Community College; with their Ranger football team that year, he recorded an average of 22 tackles per game while helping them rank 12th-nationally among junior colleges.

Monaco transferred for a third time in 1984 to play with the South Carolina Gamecocks. He was regarded as one of the strongest players on the team, being able to squat a school-record 725 pounds. However, he only saw limited action as a reserve linebacker and totaled 24 tackles in two seasons.

== Professional career ==
Monaco went unselected in the 1986 NFL draft and afterwards signed with the St. Louis Cardinals as an undrafted free agent, joining his brother Rob. He was described in a headline in The Columbia Record as the "longest of the NFL long shots" due to having seen little action at South Carolina and having not been selected in the NFL Draft; nonetheless, he ultimately was one of 11 rookies to make the team's final roster. He appeared in 15 games for the Cardinals in his first season and was a starter for two games when E. J. Junior was injured. He was released prior to the 1987 season.

When the NFLPA went on strike mid-season in 1987, Monaco was signed as a replacement player by the Green Bay Packers and was named starter. He appeared in two games, one as a starter, for the Packers, before being released at the end of the strike. In March 1988, he signed with the Kansas City Chiefs. He was released on August 29 that year. He ended his career with 17 games played, three as a starter, and recorded one fumble recovery.
