= John Sterling (American football) =

American football player (born 1964)

No. 33
- Position: Running back

Personal information
- Born: September 15, 1964 (age 62); Altus, Oklahoma, U.S.
- Listed height: 6 ft 2 in (1.88 m)
- Listed weight: 203 lb (92 kg)

Career information
- High school: Altus
- College: Central Oklahoma
- NFL draft: 1987: undrafted

Career history
- Green Bay Packers (1987)

Career NFL statistics
- Games played: 2
- Rushing attempts: 5
- Rushing yards: 20
- Stats at Pro Football Reference

John Sterling (born September 15, 1964) is an American former professional football player who was a running back for the Green Bay Packers in the National Football League (NFL). He played in two games with the Packers during the 1987 NFL season as a replacement player after the National Football League Players Association (NFLPA) went on strike for 24 days. Sterling played college football for the Central Oklahoma Bronchos, receiving honorable mention All-American from the National Association of Intercollegiate Athletics (NAIA) in 1987.

== Early life and college ==
John Sterling was born on September 15, 1964, in Altus, Oklahoma. He graduated from Altus High School before attending the University of Central Oklahoma, where he played running back for the Central Oklahoma Bronchos football team. During Sterling's first season and a half with the Bronchos, he saw limited playing time. However, halfway through the 1985 season, he took over as a starter. That year he was the team's second leading rusher and scored nine touchdowns. During the 1986 season, he set a career high for yards in a game, rushing for 213 yards and three touchdowns against Abilene Christian University. Sterling was noted for his speed, with his coaches believing it gave him a shot to continue playing football professionally. In 1987, Sterling was named as an honorable mention on the NAIA All-America team after rushing for 879 yards on 122 carries during the season.

== Professional career ==
Sterling was not drafted in the 1987 NFL draft. He signed with the Green Bay Packers but was released shortly before the start of the 1987 NFL season. After the second week of the season, the NFLPA went on strike. The third week of the season was cancelled, but weeks 4, 5 and 6 were played with replacement players. Sterling was signed back to the Packers roster on October 10 as a replacement player, the day before the week 5 game against the Detroit Lions. Prior to signing with the Packers, Sterling was also on the Denver Broncos replacement team. He played two games for the Packers, rushing five times for 20 yards.
