= Jack McAuliffe (American football) =

American football player (1901–1971)

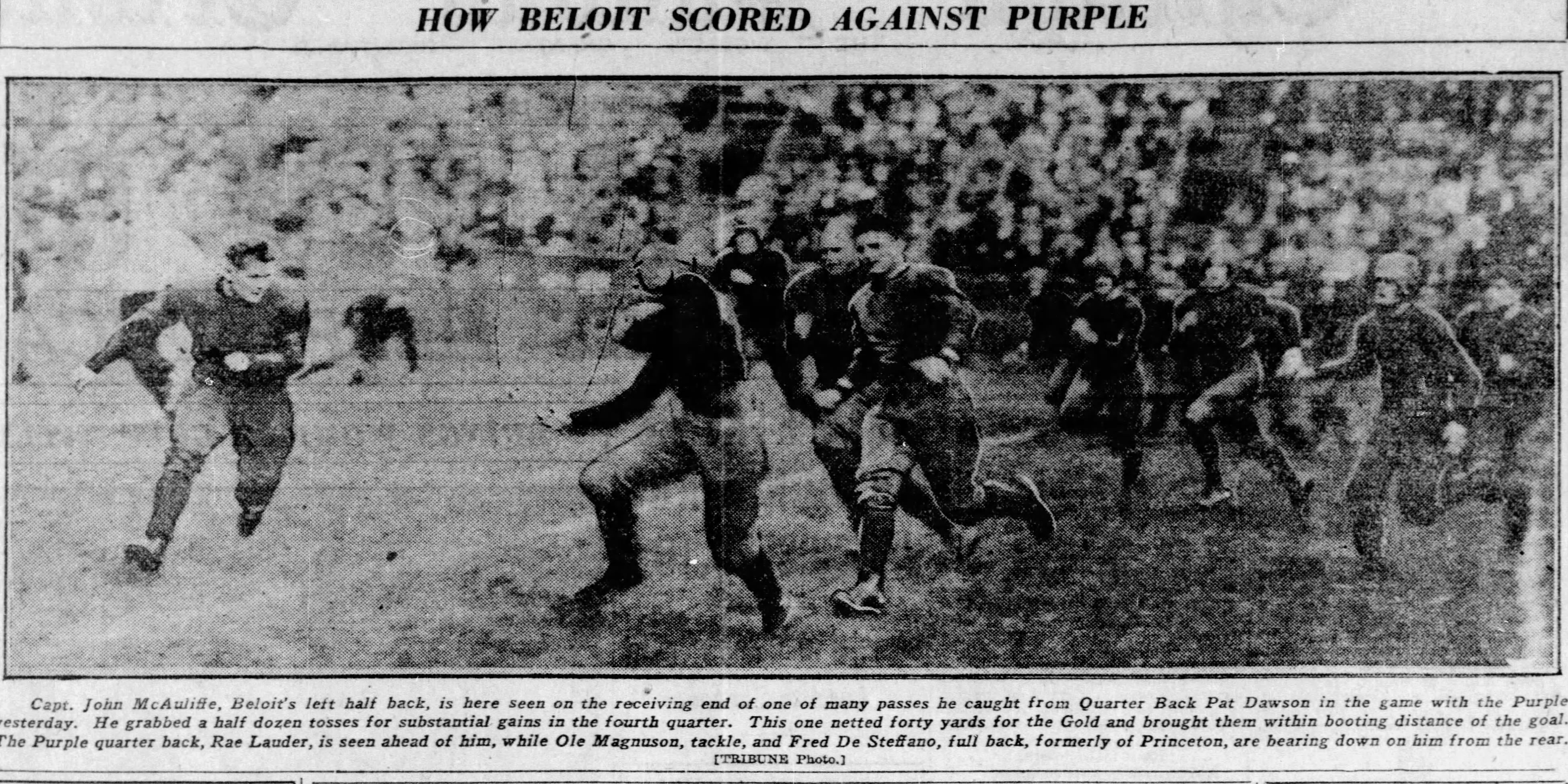
- newspaper article with photo of McAuliffe

No. 19
- Position: Halfback

Personal information
- Born: May 21, 1901; Butte, Montana
- Died: December 17, 1971 (aged 70)
- Listed height: 5 ft 7 in (1.70 m)
- Listed weight: 155 lb (70 kg)

Career information
- High school: Butte (MT)
- College: Montana; Beloit

Career history
- Green Bay Packers (1926)

Career statistics
- Games played: 8
- Games started: 4
- Stats at Pro Football Reference

John Theodore McAuliffe (May 21, 1901 – December 17, 1971) was an American football halfback for the Green Bay Packers of the National Football League (NFL). He played college football for Montana and Beloit.

== Biography ==
McAuliffe was born on May 21, 1901, in Butte, Montana.

== Career ==
McAuliffe played with the Green Bay Packers during the 1926 NFL season. He played at the collegiate level at Beloit College and the University of Montana.
