= Emil Beasy =

American football player (1898–1967)

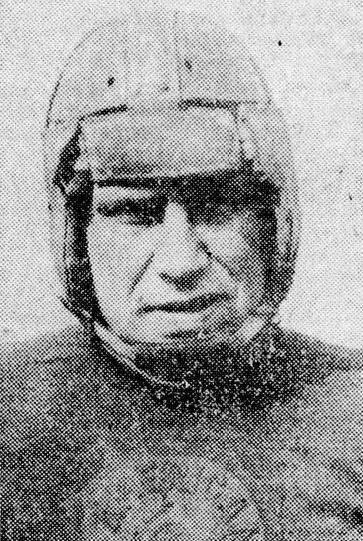
- Beasy, c. 1925

Profile
- Position: Fullback

Personal information
- Born: August 1, 1898; Minnesota, U.S.
- Died: April 21, 1967 (aged 68); Duluth, Minnesota, U.S.
- Listed weight: 162 lb (73 kg)

Career information
- College: North Dakota?

Career history
- Hibbing Miners (1916–?, 1919–1923); Green Bay Packers (1924); Hibbing Miners (1924–1925)

Career statistics
- Games played: 1
- Games started: 1

Emil Anton Beasy (Note: Identified as "Jack Beasey" by the Green Bay Packers website.) (Note: Beasy's name was frequently misspelled as "Beasey".) (August 1, 1898 – April 21, 1967) was an American professional football player. A fullback, he played semi-professionally for several years with a team in Hibbing, Minnesota, and joined the Green Bay Packers of the National Football League (NFL) in 1924, playing in one game for them.

== Early life ==
Beasy was born on August 1, 1898, in Minnesota. He was the oldest of four brothers who were all involved in Hibbing, Minnesota, sports. He grew up playing football, being a fullback, and also competed as a middleweight boxer. He graduated from high school in 1916. He reportedly attended the University of North Dakota where he played football at an unknown date, although the Green Bay Packers identified him as having played college football for the University of South Dakota.

== Professional career ==
=== First stint with Hibbing ===
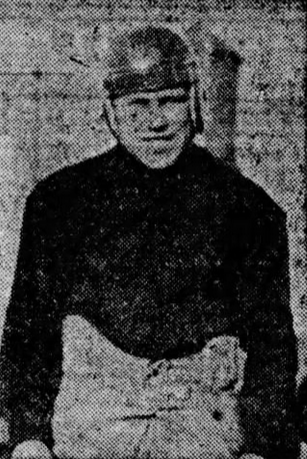
Beasy, c. 1919

After Beasy graduated from high school, he began playing semi-professional football for the team in Hibbing, known as the Hibbing Miners. He returned to the team in 1919 and was noted for his speed, with The Duluth News Tribune describing him as "one of the fastest backfield men developed on the Mesaba range" and "one of Hibbing's best ground gainers all year." At Hibbing, he was nicknamed "Busy" Beasy. He remained with Hibbing in 1920, as they compiled a record of 2–1–1 in games with known results. In 1921, he was reported as "without a doubt one of the best backs in this part of the country" and he served as Hibbing's team captain, with the News Tribune calling him "the scintillating backfield man of the local teams for many seasons past." After the 1921 football season, in which Hibbing went at least 2–3, he began playing baseball for a team in Hibbing, being named their captain while playing as their catcher.

Beasy led Hibbing to a record of 4–2–1 in 1922, which included both a win against and a close loss to the Duluth Kelleys, a future NFL team. In the loss to the Kelleys, by a score of 6–0, Beasy was reported to have gained more yards than the rest of his team's backfield combined. In 1923, Hibbing went 4–4, which included three games against NFL teams: a 6–0 loss to the Kelleys, a 10–0 loss to the Green Bay Packers, and a 27–7 loss to the Rock Island Independents. He was considered the "pride" of the team and The Post-Crescent noted that "against the Packers, Beasy was about the only Hibbing backfielder who could make any consistent gains. Beasy was hurt in this game during the third quarter ... As he walked across the field to the sidelines, holding his injured shoulder, the spectators tendered him a great ovation."

When not playing football for Hibbing, Beasy was a firefighter in the city. He also frequently fought as a boxer during his football career and was called "a mighty good mauler," with him being reported to have fought "about a dozen battles" from fall 1923 to summer 1924 against "some of the best boys in the ring."

=== Packers and later career ===
In July 1924, Beasy signed to play for the Green Bay Packers of the NFL. A report in the Green Bay Press-Gazette called him "the type of a smashing crashing fullback that the Packers have long needed." He made the team and started at fullback in the Packers' NFL season-opener, a 6–3 loss to the Kelleys, with Curly Lambeau later coming in as a substitute for him. However, within two weeks of the Kelleys game, he had left the Packers and returned to Hibbing. He only appeared in a single game for the Packers. He returned to Hibbing for the 1925 season. Afterwards, he continued playing baseball in Hibbing, doing so through at least 1933, often with several of his brothers.

== Later life and death ==
After his sports career, Beasy remained a firefighter and was the vice chairman of the Minnesota Fire Department Association. He served as a fire warden for 42 years. In 1931, he was presented a medal by the mayor of Hibbing for saving the life of a man who was trapped in a well. He was married to Esther Beasy and the two had a son and a daughter. He died in a Duluth hospital on April 21, 1967, at the age of 68.
