= Anthony Harrison =

American football player (born 1965)

No. 46
- Position: Safety

Personal information
- Born: September 26, 1965 (age 61); Toccoa, Georgia, U.S.
- Listed height: 6 ft 0 in (1.83 m)
- Listed weight: 195 lb (88 kg)

Career information
- High school: Stephens County (Georgia)
- College: Georgia Tech
- NFL draft: 1987: undrafted

Career history
- Green Bay Packers (1987)

Career NFL statistics
- Interceptions: 1
- Fumbles recoveries: 1
- Stats at Pro Football Reference

Anthony Harrison (born September 26, 1965) is an American former professional football player who was a safety for the Green Bay Packers in the National Football League (NFL). He played in three games with the Packers during the 1987 NFL season as a replacement player after the National Football League Players Association (NFLPA) went on strike for 24 days. Harrison played college football for the Georgia Institute of Technology before his professional career.

== Early life and college ==
Anthony Harrison was born on September 26, 1965, in Toccoa, Georgia. He graduated from Stephens County High School where he played football all four years and was named "North Georgia's back of the year" during his senior season; he also played baseball, hitting for a .512 batting average during his senior season. He attended the Georgia Institute of Technology, where he played safety for the Georgia Tech Yellow Jackets football team. After an injury to a teammate, he became a starter during his freshman year. He started every game as a sophomore.

== Professional career ==
Harrison went undrafted in the 1987 NFL draft. He took part in the Green Bay Packers training camp during the 1987 preseason. Near the end of the preseason, the Packers waived Harrison. After the second week of the 1987 NFL season, the NFLPA went on strike. The third week of the season was cancelled, but weeks 4, 5 and 6 were played with replacement players. Harrison was then signed by the Green Bay Packers before a week 4 game against the Minnesota Vikings as a replacement player. He played three games for the Packers, recording one interception and one fumble recovery. During a week 5 matchup against the Detroit Lions, Harrison tackled an opposing player, forcing a fumble but also injuring his neck. He was taken off the field by a stretcher and transported to the hospital, where he was cleared of any serious injuries. At the end of the strike, Harrison was not among the 16 replacement players who were signed by the Packers.

After his football career, Harrison returned to George Tech and graduated in 1989.
