= John Miller (linebacker) =

American football player (born 1960)

No. 57, 97
- Position: Linebacker

Personal information
- Born: September 22, 1960 (age 66); Oberlin, Ohio, U.S.
- Listed height: 6 ft 2 in (1.88 m)
- Listed weight: 218 lb (99 kg)

Career information
- High school: Athens (GA) Cedar Shoals
- College: Mississippi State
- NFL draft: 1983: undrafted

Career history
- Baltimore Colts (1983)*; New Jersey Generals (1984–1985); Green Bay Packers (1987)
- * Offseason or practice squad member only

Career NFL statistics
- Games played: 1
- Stats at Pro Football Reference

John Miller (born 1960) is a former linebacker in the National Football League. He was a member of the Green Bay Packers during the 1987 NFL season.

== Professional career ==
=== Baltimore Colts ===
Miller signed with the Baltimore Colts of the National Football League on May 25, 1983, but was released on August 4, 1983.

=== New Jersey Generals ===
Miller signed with the New Jersey Generals of the United States Football League on November 29, 1983. He played for the Generals during their 1984 and 1985 seasons.

=== Green Bay Packers ===
Miller played in one game for the Green Bay Packers during the 1987 season.
