= Warren Smith (guard) =

American football player (1896–1965)

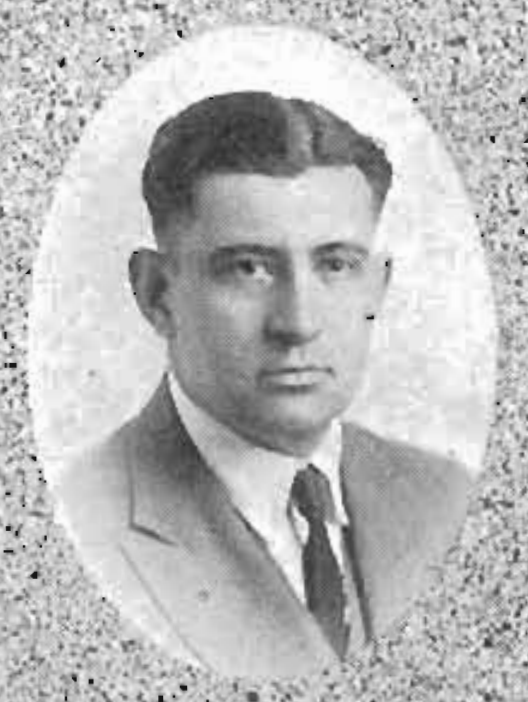
- Smith in The Brown and Gold 1922, Western Michigan yearbook

Profile
- Position: Guard

Personal information
- Born: August 5, 1896; Paw Paw, Michigan, U.S.
- Died: August 30, 1965 (aged 69); Wawa, Ontario, Canada
- Listed height: 6 ft 1 in (1.85 m)
- Listed weight: 215 lb (98 kg)

Career information
- High school: Carlton (MN)
- College: Western Michigan

Career history
- Green Bay Packers (1921)

Career statistics
- Games played: 2
- Stats at Pro Football Reference

Warren Horton Smith (August 5, 1896 – August 30, 1965) was a guard in the National Football League (NFL). He played with the Green Bay Packers during the 1921 NFL season. He was born in Paw Paw, Michigan. He played college football at Western Michigan University, lettering in 1920 and 1921.

He died on a fishing trip in Ontario, Canada in 1965.
