= Derrick Harden =

American gridiron football player (born 1964)

No. 82
- Position: Wide receiver

Personal information
- Born: April 21, 1964 (age 62); Milwaukee, Wisconsin, U.S.
- Listed height: 6 ft 1 in (1.85 m)
- Listed weight: 175 lb (79 kg)

Career information
- High school: South Division (Milwaukee)
- College: Ellsworth CC (1982–1983); Eastern New Mexico (1984–1985)
- NFL draft: 1986: undrafted

Career history
- Montreal Alouettes (1986)*; Green Bay Packers (1987)
- * Offseason or practice squad member only

Career NFL statistics
- Receptions: 2
- Receiving yards: 29
- Touchdowns: 0
- Stats at Pro Football Reference

Derrick Harden (born April 21, 1964) is an American former professional football player who was a wide receiver for one season with the Green Bay Packers of the National Football League (NFL). He played college football for the Ellsworth Panthers and Eastern New Mexico Greyhounds. He was also a member of the Montreal Alouettes of the Canadian Football League (CFL).

== Early life ==
Harden was born on April 21, 1964, in Milwaukee, Wisconsin. He attended South Division High School in Milwaukee and is one of 10 alumni of the school to play in the NFL, as well as the most recent, as of 2024. At South Division, he competed in football, where he was an end, and in track and field. In football, he was named to the Shrine all-star game after his senior season.

== College career ==
Harden enrolled at Ellsworth Community College in Iowa in 1982. As a wide receiver, he helped Ellsworth win an Iowa Junior College Conference (IJCC) title and a Like Cola Bowl berth in 1983 with a 9–1 regular season record. He was a first-team all-region selection and had compiled eight touchdowns with an average of 26 yards-per-reception by the time of the bowl game.

Harden transferred to the Eastern New Mexico Greyhounds, a National Association of Intercollegiate Athletics (NAIA) program, in 1984. In the third game of the season, against No. 6–ranked East Central Oklahoma State, he scored two touchdowns while helping Eastern New Mexico come back from a 46–14 deficit in the third quarter to win 50–46. He then broke out as the team's leading receiver and one of the top receivers in the Lone Star Conference (LSC) as a senior in 1985. He finished the season being named a first-team All-LSC selection after totaling 40 catches for 904 yards, averaging 22.6 yards-per-reception.

== Professional career ==
Not selected in the 1986 NFL draft, Harden signed with the Montreal Alouettes of the Canadian Football League (CFL) on May 6, 1986. He left the team's training camp around May 25, 1986. Harden was working at a post office in Milwaukee in early 1987 where he met former Green Bay Packers player Lionel Aldridge. Aldridge suggested to the team that it should give Harden a tryout; he signed with the Packers in May 1987. Considered a longshot to make the team, he was released on August 31.

In September, when the NFL Players Association went on strike, each team assembled rosters of replacement players, and Harden was re-signed by the Packers on September 23. He made his NFL debut on October 4 against the Minnesota Vikings in Week 4, returning one kickoff for 13 yards. He was Eastern New Mexico's fourth NFL player all-time. He returned another kickoff for 20 yards in Week 5 against the Detroit Lions, then returned two kicks for 39 yards and made two receptions for 29 yards in Week 6 against the Philadelphia Eagles, although he also had one fumble in the last game. Harden was released on October 19, at the end of the strike, ending his career with four kickoff returns for 72 yards and two receptions for 29 yards in three games played.
