= Lavale Thomas =

American football player (born 1963)

No. 45
- Position: Running back

Personal information
- Born: December 12, 1963 (age 62); Los Angeles, California, U.S.
- Listed height: 6 ft 0 in (1.83 m)
- Listed weight: 205 lb (93 kg)

Career information
- High school: Tulare Western (Tulare, California)
- College: Fresno State (1982–1985)
- NFL draft: 1986: undrafted

Career history
- Kansas City Chiefs (1986)*; Green Bay Packers (1987–1989)
- * Offseason or practice squad member only

Career NFL statistics
- Rushing yards: 19
- Rushing average: 3.8
- Receptions: 2
- Receiving yards: 52
- Touchdowns: 1
- Stats at Pro Football Reference

Lavale Alvin Thomas (born December 12, 1963) is an American former professional football player who was a running back in the National Football League (NFL). He played college football for the Fresno State Bulldogs and later had stints with the Kansas City Chiefs and Green Bay Packers. He appeared in two NFL games, both for the Packers, with one being as a replacement player during the 1987 NFL strike and the other being in the 1988 season.

== Early life ==
Thomas was born on December 12, 1963, in Los Angeles, California. He was a second cousin of Los Angeles Rams, Kansas City Chiefs and San Diego Chargers player Jewerl Thomas. He was a four-year letterman in high school; he first attended Jonesboro-Hodge High School in Jonesboro, Louisiana, playing one season in football as a center and helping them reach the state finals. Afterwards, he moved to Tulare, California, and attended Tulare Western High School; he was the first of two of their alumni to ever make it to the NFL.

Thomas played both linebacker and running back as a sophomore at Tulare Western and was selected all-conference at the former. He then moved to fullback as a junior and was honorable mention all-conference. He returned to playing running back as a senior and was one of the top players at his position in the area, setting the all-time Tulare prep record with 1,479 rushing yards. He was first-team All-East Yosemite League (EYL) for his performance and played in the Tulare–Kings All-Star Game.

== College career ==
Thomas was recruited by several major college football teams but choose to stay close to home and play for the Fresno State Bulldogs. He lettered as a true freshman in 1982. That season, he played 11 games and was one of the team's top backs. He ran for 264 yards and averaged 4.6 yards-per-carry with three rushing touchdowns despite being limited due to injury. He was again limited by injury in 1983, but still managed to be the Bulldogs' third-leading runner with 233 yards off 51 carries (a 4.6 average) and a touchdown as they went 6–5.

Thomas was set to be Fresno State's leading rusher in 1984, compiling 190 rushing yards and two touchdowns in four games before suffering a season-ending injury. When he returned for his senior season in 1985, he had to play behind James Williams and Kelly Skipper; he ended the year with 356 rushing yards on 55 carries with a touchdown, averaging 6.5 yards-per-carry. He ended his collegiate career with 210 carries for 1,043 yards (a 5.0 average) with seven rushing touchdowns, additionally tallying 27 receptions for 272 yards and another score.

== Professional career ==
After going unselected in the 1986 NFL draft, Thomas was signed by the Kansas City Chiefs as an undrafted free agent. He was released on August 18. After spending the rest of the 1986 season out of football, he signed a contract with the Green Bay Packers on April 28, 1987. He was released by the Packers on September 7, 1987. He was brought back to the team later that month as a replacement player when the National Football League Players Association went on strike. He made his NFL debut against the Minnesota Vikings in Week 4, recording five rushes for 19 yards and two receptions for 52 yards and a touchdown. He appeared in no other strike games and was placed on injured reserve in mid-October. On August 22, 1988, he was placed on injured reserve again with a knee injury. Thomas was activated from injured reserve on December 16 and played in the team's Week 16 game against the Phoenix Cardinals, recording no statistics. He was released on July 19, 1989, ending his professional career.

== Later life ==
Thomas later served as the CEO and president of the Sports Education Marketing program, a business designed to improve recruiting. He became in 2012 one of many players to sue the NFL for concussion-related injuries.
