= Jeff Drost =

American football player (born 1964)

No. 71
- Position: Defensive tackle

Personal information
- Born: January 27, 1964 (age 62); San Angelo, Texas, U.S.
- Listed height: 6 ft 5 in (1.96 m)
- Listed weight: 286 lb (130 kg)

Career information
- High school: Indianola
- College: Iowa
- NFL draft: 1987: 8th round, 198th overall pick

Career history
- Green Bay Packers (1987)

Awards and highlights
- First-team All-Big Ten (1986)

Career NFL statistics
- Sacks: 2
- Stats at Pro Football Reference

Jeff Wayne Drost (born January 27, 1964) is an American former professional football player who was a defensive tackle for the Green Bay Packers of the National Football League (NFL). He played college football for the Iowa Hawkeyes.

== Early life ==
Jeff Wayne Drost was born in San Angelo, Texas. For the 2022 season he is an assistant football coach at Roosevelt High School in Des Moines, Iowa for the Roughriders.

== Career ==
Drost was selected 198th overall in the eighth round of the 1987 NFL draft by the Green Bay Packers and played that season with the team. He played at the collegiate level at the University of Iowa.
