= Rydell Melancon =

American football player (born 1962)

Rydel Melancon
No. 52, 60
- Position: Linebacker

Personal information
- Born: January 10, 1962 (age 64); New Orleans, Louisiana, U.S.
- Listed height: 6 ft 2 in (1.88 m)
- Listed weight: 227 lb (103 kg)

Career information
- High school: St. James (LA)
- College: LSU
- NFL draft: 1984: 4th round, 94th overall pick

Career history
- Atlanta Falcons (1984–1985); Green Bay Packers (1987)
- Stats at Pro Football Reference

Rydell Joseph Melancon, (sometimes spelled Malancon), (born January 10, 1962) is an American former professional football linebacker in the National Football League (NFL). Melancon was selected by the Atlanta Falcons in the fourth round of the 1984 NFL draft and played that season with the team. After two seasons away from the NFL, Melancon played with the Green Bay Packers during the 1987 NFL season. He played at the collegiate level at Louisiana State University. Melancon was born in New Orleans, Louisiana.
