= Kelly Cook =

American football player (born 1962)

No. 20
- Position: Running back

Personal information
- Born: August 20, 1962 (age 64); Cushing, Oklahoma, U.S.
- Listed height: 5 ft 11 in (1.80 m)
- Listed weight: 225 lb (102 kg)

Career information
- High school: Midwest City
- College: Oklahoma State
- NFL draft: 1985: undrafted

Career history
- Buffalo Bills (1986)*; Green Bay Packers (1987)
- * Offseason or practice squad member only
- Stats at Pro Football Reference

Kelly Cook is a former running back in the National Football League.

== Biography ==
Cook was born Kelly Edward Cook on August 20, 1962, in Cushing, Oklahoma.

== Career ==
Cook played with the Green Bay Packers during the 1987 NFL season. He played at the collegiate level at Oklahoma State University-Stillwater.
