= Patrick Scott (American football) =

American football player (born 1964)

No. 83
- Position: Wide receiver

Personal information
- Born: September 13, 1964 (age 62); Shreveport, Louisiana, U.S.
- Listed height: 5 ft 10 in (1.78 m)
- Listed weight: 170 lb (77 kg)

Career information
- High school: Ringgold (LA)
- College: Grambling State
- NFL draft: 1987: 11th round, 282nd overall pick

Career history
- Green Bay Packers (1987–1988)

Career NFL statistics
- Receptions: 28
- Receiving yards: 354
- Touchdowns: 1
- Stats at Pro Football Reference

Patrick Sterling Scott (born September 13, 1964) is an American former professional football player who was a wide receiver in the National Football League (NFL). He was selected by the Green Bay Packers in the eleventh round of the 1987 NFL draft with the 282nd overall pick. He played two seasons with the team.
