= Bob Gruber =

American football player (born 1958)

No. 75, 65, 69, 71, 5
- Position: Offensive tackle

Personal information
- Born: June 7, 1958 (age 68); Del Rio, Texas, U.S.
- Listed height: 6 ft 5 in (1.96 m)
- Listed weight: 275 lb (125 kg)

Career information
- High school: Greenville
- College: Pittsburgh
- NFL draft: 1980: 10th round, 276th overall pick

Career history
- Los Angeles Rams (1980)*; Jacksonville Bulls (1984–1985); Cleveland Browns (1986); Green Bay Packers (1987); Miami Dolphins (1987); Washington Redskins (1987)*
- * Offseason or practice squad member only

Awards and highlights
- National champion (1976)

Career NFL statistics
- Games played: 1
- Stats at Pro Football Reference

Robert Leon Gruber Jr. (born June 7, 1958) is an American former professional football player who was an offensive tackle in the National Football League (NFL) for the Green Bay Packers, Cleveland Browns, Miami Dolphins, Washington Redskins, and Los Angeles Rams. Gruber played college football for the Pittsburgh Panthers before being selected by the Rams in the 10th round of the 1980 NFL draft. He is a graduate of Greenville High School and is originally from Greenville, Pennsylvania. He has one daughter, Andrea Gruber, to his wife Deborah (deceased) He has two younger siblings, Pamela Redfoot and Brian Gruber.
