= Norman Jefferson =

American football player (born 1964)

No. 38, 12
- Positions: Defensive back, return specialist

Personal information
- Born: July 7, 1964 (age 62); Marrero, Louisiana, U.S.
- Listed height: 5 ft 10 in (1.78 m)
- Listed weight: 183 lb (83 kg)

Career information
- High school: John Ehret (Marrero)
- College: LSU
- NFL draft: 1987: 12th round, 335th overall pick

Career history
- Green Bay Packers (1987–1988); BC Lions (1990–1991)

Awards and highlights
- First-team All-SEC (1985)

Career NFL statistics
- Fumble recoveries: 2
- Return yards: 161
- Stats at Pro Football Reference

Norman Jefferson Jr. (born August 7, 1964) is an American former professional football player who was a cornerback in the National Football League (NFL). He was selected by the Green Bay Packers in the 12th round of the 1987 NFL draft with the 335th overall pick. He was the last player taken, making him Mr. Irrelevant of the 1987 NFL draft. He played two seasons with the Packers. Jefferson played college football for the LSU Tigers. He was born in Marrero, Louisiana, and attended John Ehret High School.
