= Tony Hunter (running back) =

American football player (born 1963)

No. 31
- Position: Running back

Personal information
- Born: February 24, 1963 (age 63); Memphis, Tennessee, U.S.
- Listed height: 5 ft 9 in (1.75 m)
- Listed weight: 215 lb (98 kg)

Career information
- High school: Tech (Memphis)
- College: Minnesota
- NFL draft: 1985: undrafted

Career history
- Washington Redskins (1985)*; Green Bay Packers (1987)
- * Offseason or practice squad member only
- Stats at Pro Football Reference

Anthony Fernando Hunter (born February 24, 1963) is an American former professional football player who was a running back for the Green Bay Packers of the National Football League (NFL). He played college football for the Minnesota Golden Gophers.
