= Calvin Wallace =

American football player (born 1965)

No. 93
- Position: Defensive end

Personal information
- Born: April 17, 1965 (age 61); Montgomery, West Virginia, U.S.
- Listed height: 6 ft 3 in (1.91 m)
- Listed weight: 230 lb (104 kg)

Career information
- College: West Virginia Tech
- NFL draft: 1987: undrafted

Career history
- Atlanta Falcons (1987)*; Green Bay Packers (1987)
- * Offseason or practice squad member only
- Stats at Pro Football Reference

Calvin Kerr Wallace (born April 17, 1965) is an American former professional football defensive end who played in the National Football League (NFL).

== Early life ==
Wallace was born in Montgomery, West Virginia.

== Career ==
Wallace was a member of the Green Bay Packers during the 1987 NFL season. He played college football at the West Virginia University Institute of Technology.
