= Bill Cherry =

American football player (born 1961)

No. 69
- Position: Center

Personal information
- Born: January 5, 1961 (age 65); DeLand, Florida, U.S.
- Listed height: 6 ft 4 in (1.93 m)
- Listed weight: 275 lb (125 kg)

Career information
- High school: Dover (TN) Stewart Co.
- College: Middle Tennessee State
- NFL draft: 1982: undrafted

Career history
- Green Bay Packers (1986–1988)

Career NFL statistics
- Games played: 28
- Games started: 1
- Stats at Pro Football Reference

William Kimble Cherry (born January 5, 1961) is an American former professional football player who was an offensive lineman for the Green Bay Packers of the National Football League (NFL). Cherry played college football for the Middle Tennessee Blue Raiders and played professionally for two seasons. He retired from football in 1987.
