= Keith Paskett =

American football player (born 1964)

No. 82
- Position: Wide receiver

Personal information
- Born: December 7, 1964 (age 61); Nashville, Tennessee, U.S.
- Listed height: 5 ft 11 in (1.80 m)
- Listed weight: 180 lb (82 kg)

Career information
- High school: Glencliff (Nashville)
- College: Western Kentucky
- NFL draft: 1987: undrafted

Career history
- Green Bay Packers (1987–1988)

Career NFL statistics
- Receptions: 12
- Receiving yards: 188
- Touchdowns: 1
- Stats at Pro Football Reference

Keith Paxton Paskett (born December 7, 1964) is an American former professional football player who was a wide receiver in the National Football League (NFL). He played college football for the Western Kentucky Hilltoppers.

== Early life ==
Paskett was born in Nashville, Tennessee. He was a 1982 graduate of Glencliff Comprehensive High School in Nashville, Tennessee. There he ran track and played football.

== Career ==
Paskett played with the Green Bay Packers during the 1987 NFL season. He played at the collegiate level at Western Kentucky University.
