= Kenneth Johnson (American football) =

American football player (born 1963)

No. 39
- Position: Defensive back

Personal information
- Born: December 28, 1963 (age 62); Weir, Mississippi, U.S.
- Listed height: 6 ft 0 in (1.83 m)
- Listed weight: 185 lb (84 kg)

Career information
- High school: Weir (Mississippi)
- College: Mississippi State

Career history
- New Jersey Generals (1984–1985); Green Bay Packers (1987–1988)

Career statistics
- Games played: 12
- Interceptions: 1
- Sacks: 1
- Stats at Pro Football Reference

Kenneth Johnson (born December 28, 1963) is a former defensive back in the United States Football League and National Football League.

== Biography ==
Johnson was born on December 28, 1963, in Weir, Mississippi. Has a son named Biko Johnson and two daughters named Khenedi and Imani Johnson.

== Career ==
Johnson was drafted by the New Jersey Generals in the 1984 USFL territorial draft and played for the Generals in 1984 and 1985. Johnson played with the Houston Oilers and Green Bay Packers during the 1987 NFL season. He played at the collegiate level at Mississippi State University.
