= Todd Auer =

American football player (born 1965)

Western Colorado Mountaineers
- Title: Defensive coordinator

Personal information
- Born: January 18, 1965 (age 61); Winona, Minnesota, U.S.
- Listed height: 6 ft 1 in (1.85 m)
- Listed weight: 230 lb (104 kg)

Career information
- High school: Gale-Ettrick-Trempealeau (Galesville, Wisconsin)
- College: Western Illinois
- NFL draft: 1987: undrafted

Career history

Playing
- Green Bay Packers (1987)

Coaching
- Western Illinois (1989) Graduate assistant; Chadron State (1990–1993) Offensive line coach; Chadron State (1994–2011) Defensive coordinator; Colorado Mesa (2012–2013) Defensive coordinator; Southern Illinois (2014–2015) Defensive coordinator; Western Colorado (2016–present) Defensive coordinator
- Stats at Pro Football Reference

Todd Auer (born January 18, 1965) is an American college football coach and former player. He is the defensive coordinator for Western Colorado University, a position he has held since 2016. He played professionally as a linebacker for the Green Bay Packers of the National Football League (NFL). He was signed as an undrafted free agent after playing college football for the Western Illinois Leathernecks. He is considered to be one of the best defensive coordinators in NCAA Division 2, as his defense is always ranked top 10 nationally.

== Biography ==
Auer was born in Winona, Minnesota on January 18, 1965, grew up in Trempealeau, Wisconsin, and attended Gale-Ettrick-Trempealeau High School in Galesville, Wisconsin. He has four children.

== Playing career ==
Auer played with the Green Bay Packers during the 1987 NFL season. He played at the collegiate level at Western Illinois University. He was a first-team All American and a second-team Academic All American at WIU.

== Coaching career ==
Auer's first coaching experience came at Western Illinois University in 1989. The next year in 1990 he joined to coaching staff at Chadron State College as the offensive line coach. Was named Defensive Coordinator in 1994 and remained DC until 2011. In 2012 and 2013 he was the DC at Colorado Mesa University. Then moved with his family to Southern Illinois University Carbondale from 2013 to 2016. Now Is currently the DC at Western State Colorado University.
