= Ken Jordan (American football) =

American football player (born 1964)

No. 55
- Position: Linebacker

Personal information
- Born: April 29, 1964 (age 62); Birmingham, Alabama, U.S.
- Listed height: 6 ft 2 in (1.88 m)
- Listed weight: 235 lb (107 kg)

Career information
- High school: Jackson-Olin
- College: Tuskegee
- NFL draft: 1987: undrafted

Career history
- Atlanta Falcons (1987)*; Green Bay Packers (1987)
- * Offseason or practice squad member only

Career NFL statistics
- Sacks: 1
- Stats at Pro Football Reference

Kenneth Ray Jordan (born April 29, 1964) is an American former professional football player who was a linebacker for the Green Bay Packers of the National Football League (NFL) in 1987. He played college football for the Tuskegee Golden Tigers.
