= Craig Jay =

American football player (born 1963)

No. 26
- Position: Tight end

Personal information
- Born: February 5, 1963 (age 63); Miami, Florida, U.S.
- Listed height: 6 ft 4 in (1.93 m)
- Listed weight: 257 lb (117 kg)

Career information
- High school: Miami Springs (Miami Springs, Florida, U.S.)
- College: Miami Dade CC (1982–1983); Mount Senario (1985–1987)
- NFL draft: 1987: undrafted

Career history
- Green Bay Packers (1987)

Career NFL statistics
- Games played: 3
- Stats at Pro Football Reference

Craig Adam Jay (born February 5, 1960) is an American former professional football player who was a tight end for the Green Bay Packers of the National Football League (NFL). He played college football for the Mount Senario Fighting Saint and later the Packers during the 1987 NFL season.

== Early life ==
Jay attended Miami Springs High School where he played high school football as a quarterback as well as basketball. He joined Miami Dade College in 1982 where he continued with his basketball career but left after one season. He later joined Mount Senario College where he played basketball and football. He was named All-Upper Midwest Collegiate Conference team during both his years at MSC.

== Professional football career ==
Jay played as a replacement player for the Green Bay Packers during the 1987 NFL strike.
