= Jim Meyer =

American football player (born 1963)

No. 62
- Position: Offensive tackle

Personal information
- Born: June 9, 1963 (age 63); Glenview, Illinois, U.S.
- Listed height: 6 ft 6 in (1.98 m)
- Listed weight: 310 lb (141 kg)

Career information
- High school: Brodhead (Brodhead, Wisconsin)
- College: Illinois State
- NFL draft: 1986: 7th round, 167th overall pick

Career history
- Cleveland Browns (1986); Houston Oilers (1987)*; Green Bay Packers (1987)
- * Offseason or practice squad member only

Career NFL statistics
- Games played: 2
- Stats at Pro Football Reference

James David Meyer (born June 9, 1963) is an American former offensive tackle in the National Football League (NFL). Meyer played for the Green Bay Packers during the 1987 NFL season. He had previously been drafted in the seventh round of the 1986 NFL draft by the Cleveland Browns.
