= Carl Sullivan =

American football player (born 1962)

No. 95
- Position: Defensive end

Personal information
- Born: April 30, 1962 (age 64); San Jose, California
- Listed height: 6 ft 4 in (1.93 m)
- Listed weight: 248 lb (112 kg)

Career information
- High school: Abraham Lincoln
- College: San Jose State
- NFL draft: 1984: undrafted

Career history
- Oakland Invaders (1984); Green Bay Packers (1987)
- Stats at Pro Football Reference

Carl Sullivan is a former defensive end in the National Football League.

== Biography ==
Sullivan was born Carl Jeffery Sullivan on April 30, 1962, in San Jose, California. He attended Abraham Lincoln High School and graduated in 1980.

== Career ==
Sullivan played with the Green Bay Packers during the 1987 NFL season. He played at the collegiate level at San Jose State University.
