= Elbert Watts =

American football player (born 1963)

No. 28
- Position: Defensive back

Personal information
- Born: March 20, 1963 (age 63); Carson, California, U.S.
- Listed height: 6 ft 1 in (1.85 m)
- Listed weight: 205 lb (93 kg)

Career information
- High school: Venice (California)
- College: Oklahoma; USC
- NFL draft: 1986: 9th round, 243rd overall pick

Career history
- Los Angeles Rams (1986)*; Green Bay Packers (1986–1987)
- * Offseason or practice squad member only

Career NFL statistics
- Interceptions: 1
- Sacks: 1
- Return yards: 239
- Stats at Pro Football Reference

Elbert Watts (born March 20, 1963) is a former defensive back in the National Football League (NFL).

== Biography ==
Watts was born on March 20, 1963, in Carson, California.

== Football career ==
Watts was drafted 243rd overall in the ninth round of the 1986 NFL draft by the Los Angeles Rams and played that season with the Green Bay Packers. He played at the collegiate level at the University of Southern California and the University of Oklahoma.
