= Warren Bone =

American football player (born 1964)

No. 72
- Position: Defensive end

Personal information
- Born: November 4, 1964; Santa Barbara, California, U.S.
- Listed height: 6 ft 4 in (1.93 m)
- Listed weight: 260 lb (118 kg)

Career information
- High school: Fairfield (Fairfield, Alabama)
- College: Texas Southern
- NFL draft: 1987: undrafted

Career history
- Pittsburgh Steelers (1987)*; Green Bay Packers (1987); Houston Oilers (1989)*; Dallas Cowboys (1989)*; Miami Dolphins (1990)*
- * Offseason or practice squad member only
- Stats at Pro Football Reference

Warren James Bone (born November 4, 1964) is an American former professional football defensive end in the National Football League (NFL).

== Early life ==
Bone was born in Fairfield, Alabama.

== Career ==
Bone was a member of the Green Bay Packers during the 1987 NFL season. He played at the college level at Texas Southern University.
