= Bill Renner =

American football player (born 1959)

No. 13
- Position: Punter

Personal information
- Born: May 23, 1959 (age 67); Quantico, Virginia, U.S.
- Listed height: 6 ft 0 in (1.83 m)
- Listed weight: 198 lb (90 kg)

Career information
- High school: Tazewell (VA)
- College: Virginia Tech
- NFL draft: 1983: undrafted

Career history
- Minnesota Vikings (1983)*; Chicago Bears (1984)*; Green Bay Packers (1986–1987); New York Jets (1988)*
- * Offseason or practice squad member only

Career NFL statistics
- Punts: 35
- Punt yards: 1,334
- Longest punt: 50
- Stats at Pro Football Reference

William Arthur Renner Jr. (born May 23, 1959) is a former punter in the National Football League (NFL) who played for the Green Bay Packers. Renner played collegiate ball for Virginia Tech and played professionally for 2 seasons retired in 1987. Renner also coached for Tazewell High School in Tazewell, VA. Renner was also the former head coach of West Springfield High School in Virginia. Renner is the son of retired U.S. Marine Corps Colonel William Arthur Renner Sr, and the father of Ravens quarterback Bryn Renner and Radio City Rockette, Summer Renner.

Renner coached in the Northern Virginia area before moving to Chapel Hill. He retired from coaching to become a training consultant and author.
