= Von Mansfield =

American football player (born 1960)

No. 45, 44
- Position: Cornerback

Personal information
- Born: July 12, 1960 (age 66); Anderson, Indiana, U.S.
- Listed height: 5 ft 11 in (1.80 m)
- Listed weight: 185 lb (84 kg)

Career information
- High school: University (Milwaukee, Wisconsin)
- College: Wisconsin
- NFL draft: 1982: 5th round, 122nd overall pick

Career history
- Atlanta Falcons (1982)*; Philadelphia Eagles (1982); Birmingham Stallions (1984); Arizona Outlaws (1985); Green Bay Packers (1987)
- * Offseason or practice squad member only

Career NFL statistics
- Interceptions: 1
- Fumble recoveries: 1
- Stats at Pro Football Reference

Von Mansfield (born July 12, 1960) is an American former professional football player who was a defensive back in the National Football League (NFL).

== Biography ==
Mansfield was born Edward Von Mansfield on July 12, 1960, in Anderson, Indiana.

== Professional career ==
Mansfield was drafted 122nd overall in the fifth round of the 1982 NFL draft by the Atlanta Falcons and played that season with the Philadelphia Eagles. After four years away from the NFL, he played with the Green Bay Packers during the 1987 NFL season.

He played at the collegiate level at the University of Wisconsin-Madison.
