= Chuck Washington (American football) =

American football player (born 1964)

Charles Washington
No. 18
- Position: Defensive back

Personal information
- Born: January 9, 1964 (age 62); Topeka, Kansas, U.S.
- Listed height: 5 ft 11 in (1.80 m)
- Listed weight: 186 lb (84 kg)

Career information
- High school: Pine Bluff (Pine Bluff, Arkansas)
- College: Arkansas
- NFL draft: 1987: undrafted

Career history
- Green Bay Packers (1987)

Awards and highlights
- Second-team All-SWC (1986)

Career NFL statistics
- Fumble recoveries: 1
- Stats at Pro Football Reference

Charles Edward Washington (born January 9, 1964) is an American former professional football player who was a defensive back in the National Football League (NFL). He played college football for the Arkansas Razorbacks.

== Career ==
Washington played with the Green Bay Packers during the 1987 NFL season. He played at the collegiate level at the University of Arkansas.
