= Cornelius Redick =

American football player (born 1964)

No. 87, 8
- Position: Wide receiver

Personal information
- Born: January 7, 1964 (age 62); Los Angeles, California, U.S.
- Listed height: 5 ft 11 in (1.80 m)
- Listed weight: 185 lb (84 kg)

Career information
- High school: Pius X (Downey, California)
- College: Cal State-Fullerton
- NFL draft: 1986: 7th round, 169th overall pick

Career history
- Philadelphia Eagles (1986); Green Bay Packers (1987); Cleveland Browns (1988)*; Edmonton Eskimos (1989); Ottawa Rough Riders (1989–1990)
- * Offseason or practice squad member only

Career NFL statistics
- Receptions: 1
- Receiving yards: 18
- Stats at Pro Football Reference

Cornelius Redick (born January 7, 1964) is a former wide receiver in the National Football League (NFL).

== Biography ==
Redick was born in Los Angeles, California.

== Career ==
Redick was selected in the seventh round of the 1986 NFL draft by the Philadelphia Eagles. He would be a member of the Green Bay Packers during the 1987 NFL season.

He played at the collegiate level at California State University, Fullerton.
