= Kevin Willhite =

American football player (born 1963)

No. 35
- Position: Running back

Personal information
- Born: May 4, 1963 (age 63); Sacramento, California, U.S.
- Listed height: 5 ft 11 in (1.80 m)
- Listed weight: 208 lb (94 kg)

Career information
- High school: Cordova (Rancho Cordova, California)
- College: Oregon
- NFL draft: 1987: undrafted

Career history
- Green Bay Packers (1987)

Career NFL statistics
- Rushing yards: 251
- Rushing average: 4.7
- Stats at Pro Football Reference

Alfred Kevin Willhite (born May 4, 1963) is an American former professional football player for the Green Bay Packers of the National Football League (NFL). He played college football for the Oregon Ducks.

Willhite attended Cordova High School in Rancho Cordova, California, graduating in 1982. He was one of the greatest running backs in California prep history, rushing for 4,901 yards and scoring 72 touchdowns. He was selected into the Sac-Joaquin section Hall of Fame.

He was also a great prep sprinter. As a junior in 1981, he won the 200 meters at the California State track meet with a legal wind-aided time of 20.8. As a senior in 1982, he ran 100 meters in 10.5 and had a hand-timed 10.4.

In 1981, he was named the California prep athlete of the year (for football and track) and was separately named the California prep football player of the year. After his senior football year, he also earned three national honors. He received the Dial Award as the outstanding scholar-athlete of the year. Making the 1982 Parade Magazine All-American team, he was named the national back of the year, despite very highly recruited Marcus Dupree from Philadelphia, Mississippi, who became a freshman sensation with the Oklahoma Sooners as a true freshman in 1982, being a contender. He was also selected for the Sam B. Nicola Trophy as the National High school Player of the Year by the Touchdown Club of Columbus, Ohio in 1981. In the 1982 Long Beach Press Telegram Best in the West football recruits rankings, he received 10 votes for the best college running back prospect on the West Coast which was the most a recruit could receive.

One of the most highly recruited prep football players ever out of the State of California in 1981–1982, he verbally committed to the University of Washington about three weeks before National Signing Day on February 10, 1982, despite the Huskies already having RB Jacque Robinson who as a freshman was the MVP of the 1982 Rose Bowl game in which the Huskies beat Iowa 28–0. But on signing day, Willhite shocked the college football world and signed with the University of Oregon. Reportedly, he ultimately chose the Ducks over the Huskies because of the Ducks' track program.

Willhite severely tore his hamstring during his senior high school track season in 1982 and then suffered further injuries at the University of Oregon during his freshman season, which resulted in him redshirting in 1982. He had an undistinguished college football career. Because of the effect of his injuries, he was switched to fullback where he was used mostly as a blocking back. He became a starter his senior year.

During the NFL strike season of 1987, Willhite became a replacement player for the Green Bay Packers. In three games for the Packers, he rushed for 251 yards on 53 carries (4.7 avg), with a long run of 61 yards, but no touchdowns. He is the younger brother of former Denver Broncos' RB Gerald Willhite.
