= Tony Elliott (defensive back) =

American football player (born 1964)

Tony F. Elliott
No. 27
- Position: Safety

Personal information
- Born: January 10, 1964 (age 62); Detroit, Michigan, U.S.
- Listed height: 5 ft 10 in (1.78 m)
- Listed weight: 195 lb (88 kg)

Career information
- High school: Finney (MI)
- College: Central Michigan
- NFL draft: 1987: undrafted

Career history
- Green Bay Packers (1987)

Career NFL statistics
- Games played: 1
- Stats at Pro Football Reference

Anthony Fitzgerald Elliott (born January 10, 1964) is an American former professional football player who was a safety in the National Football League (NFL). He played college football for the Central Michigan Chippewas. He was a member of the Green Bay Packers during the 1987 NFL season.

Tony was a star player at Central Michigan University and was being scouted by multiple professional teams including the Dallas Cowboys. Tony had every reason to look forward to a successful professional career, and his only dream was to make enough money to buy his mother a new house, outside of Detroit.

Unfortunately, during the spring scrimmage of his senior year, Tony went down on the field. He had not been hit and his friends in the stands were confused when he was driven off the field and to the locker room. Tony's Achilles tendon had snapped, and he was taken to Central Michigan Community Hospital for surgery that night. This was a career-altering injury as he was unable to regain his speed and was not drafted.

Pre-draft measurables
Height	Weight	Arm length	Hand span	40-yard dash	10-yard split	20-yard split	20-yard shuttle	Vertical jump	Broad jump	Bench press
5 ft 10 3/8 in (1.79 m)	190 lb (86 kg)	30 1/2 in (0.77 m)	9 1/4 in (0.23 m)	4.84 s	1.62 s	2.81 s	4.21 s	27.0 in (0.69 m)	8 ft 7 in (2.62 m)	8 reps
All values from NFL Combine

During the NFL player strike of 1987, Tony was able to sign on with the Green Bay Packers, but then suffered a knee injury.
