= Chris Mandeville =

American football player (born 1965)

No. 44, 41
- Position: Safety

Personal information
- Born: February 1, 1965; Santa Barbara, California, U.S.
- Listed height: 6 ft 1 in (1.85 m)
- Listed weight: 215 lb (98 kg)

Career information
- High school: Irvine (Irvine, California)
- College: UC Davis
- NFL draft: 1987: undrafted

Career history
- Green Bay Packers (1987–1988); Washington Redskins (1989)
- Stats at Pro Football Reference

Chris Scott Mandeville (born February 1, 1965) is an American former professional football defensive back in the National Football League (NFL), he played one year for the Washington Redskins and two years for the Green Bay Packers. He played college football at the University of California-Davis. He set a record with 165 yards in a game with only one dropped pass his whole entire career in college.

== Early life ==
Christopher S. Mandeville attended Irvine High School, and was a student and letter man in football and track and field. In track and field, he was an All-California Interstate Federation athlete and broke the school record in the long jump and the triple jump.
