= John McGarry (American football) =

American football player (born 1963)

No. 61
- Position: Guard

Personal information
- Born: November 24, 1963 (age 62); Chicago, Illinois, U.S.
- Listed height: 6 ft 5 in (1.96 m)
- Listed weight: 288 lb (131 kg)

Career information
- High school: Marian Catholic (Chicago Heights, Illinois)
- College: Saint Joseph's
- NFL draft: 1987: undrafted

Career history
- Green Bay Packers (1987)

Career NFL statistics
- Games played: 2
- Games started: 1
- Stats at Pro Football Reference

John Thomas McGarry (born November 24, 1963) is an American former professional football player who was a guard in the National Football League (NFL). He played college football for the Saint Joseph's Pumas.

McGarry was born in Chicago, Illinois. He played with the Green Bay Packers during the 1987 NFL season. He played at the collegiate level at Saint Joseph's College.
