= Replacement player =

Player who plays during an ongoing strike

In professional sports, a replacement player is an athlete who is not a member of the league's players association and plays during a labor dispute such as a strike or lockout, serving as a strikebreaker.

Replacements related to strikes are mostly a North American phenomenon, since players in many other countries do not have league-wide collective salary bargaining (instead bargaining only with the club they are contracted to, and most commonly on an individual basis). A strike did however happen in the 2011–12 La Liga season in Spain, but no replacement teams were set up.

Elsewhere, replacement teams can occasionally happen through, among other things, illness breakouts (especially COVID-19) and aviation accidents.

== Instances of replacement players ==
=== National Football League – 1987 ===
The National Football League Players Association (NFLPA) went on strike in 1987, and the owners brought in replacement players to continue the season. After three weeks, many of the players on strike returned, weakening the union's position.

=== Major League Baseball – 1995 ===
In 1994, the Major League Baseball Players Association (MLBPA) went on strike. Spring training in 1995 started with replacement players. However, the dispute was settled before regular season games were played. Players who agreed to serve as replacement players were subsequently blacklisted by the MLBPA.

=== United States men's national soccer team – 2005 ===
In 2005, a labor conflict between the United States Soccer Federation and its players led to United States men's national soccer team players not reporting to camp in advance of qualification for the 2006 World Cup. The camp was made up of replacement players from the Major Indoor Soccer League and the lower-division United Soccer Leagues. The two sides came to an agreement before any matches were played.

=== Toronto Triumph – 2011 ===
Twenty of the 26 players on the Lingerie Football League's Toronto Triumph—including team captain Krista Ford—quit the team after its first game in 2011, citing numerous complaints, including injury concerns, incompetent coaching, and league management. The mass exodus left only starting quarterback Donna Paul and five other players still on the team. The Triumph added 10 replacement players to their roster to finish out the season.

=== Arena Football League – 2012 ===
The Arena Football League Players Union voted to go on strike on March 9, 2012, the same day as they were scheduled to begin the 2012 season. However, the strike only lasted for six hours and only affected the season opener between the Pittsburgh Power and Orlando Predators. For that game, about 20 of the 25 players were replacement players, but some regulars returned in the game during the second quarter. The regular players returned for the rest of the 2012 season.

=== Norway national football team – 2020 ===
During the 2020–21 UEFA Nations League B while preparing for 2 away matches against Romania and Austria, the Norway member Omar Elabdellaoui tested positive for COVID-19 on 13 November 2020. Under Norwegian government rules at the time, this meant the entire squad he had been practicing with were banned from travelling to other countries while in quarantine.

Norway had to forfeit their match against Romania 2 days later, but hastily set up a replacement squad (known locally as Nødlandslaget at the time) with an entirely different squad where every single player and coach had been replaced in time for the match against Austria on 18 November 2020, which they drew 1-1 after conceding a goal in injury time. They missed out on a win that would've seen them promoted to the 2022–23 UEFA Nations League A, but were nevertheless applauded for their effort back in Norway.

== Replacement officials ==
Though not technically players, professional officials have associations very similar to players associations.

=== National Hockey League – 1993 ===
The National Hockey League Officials Association struck in 1993. The league decided to bring in replacement officials, however many officials from the minor leagues and high-level junior hockey stood with the union and refused to break the picket line. This led to the resolution of the strike after 17 days.

=== Major League Baseball – 1999 ===
In 1999, 22 Major League Baseball umpires resigned since their collective bargaining agreement with the Major League Umpires Association did not allow them to strike. The 12 umpires who decided not to resign were joined by 25 replacements. The umpires' posturing was unsuccessful and led to a lengthy legal battle. In the end, some – but not all – of the umpires who resigned were rehired, the Major League Umpires Association was decertified and a replacement union, the World Umpires Association (now the Major League Baseball Umpires Association), was created to represent the umpires.

=== National Football League ===
==== 2001 ====
Before the 2001 NFL season, the NFL and its officials' union were unable to secure a deal, resulting in the officials going on strike partway through the season. Replacement officials from the NCAA and Arena Football League were brought in to officiate games. Much to the surprise of the league, many fans found the replacement officials to be better than the ones who were doing the officiating in the first place, but after four weeks, an agreement was reached and the original officials returned to the field.

==== 2012 ====
In June 2012, the NFL Referees Association's collective bargaining agreement expired, resulting in the original officials being locked out. As a result, the league announced that replacement officials from the NCAA, the Arena Football League, and the Indoor Football League would be used for the preseason and at least the first few weeks of the regular season. Unlike the 2001 replacements, the 2012 replacements were widely criticized. The criticism spiked after a September 2012 Monday Night Football game ended in controversy after a crucial end-of-game Hail Mary pass was awarded to the wrong team, thus directly altering the outcome of the game. The NFL refused to overturn the erroneous call but intensified their efforts to reach a deal with the union.

The two sides came to an agreement on September 26, 2012. The NFLRA officials officiated the Thursday night game the next day.

== Auto racing ==
=== NASCAR ===
At the 1969 NASCAR Talladega 500, many of the top drivers in the Grand National Series boycotted the race, due to safety issues. The drivers who were part of the newly formed PDA (Professional Driver Association) led by Richard Petty, cited dangerous high speeds, coupled with tire grip/wear issues at the brand new Alabama International Motor Speedway. NASCAR scrambled to fill the field last-minute with other drivers not affiliated with the PDA, and drivers from the Grand American series ("pony cars") to run a race for the fans, most notably Richard Childress, who later won eleven NASCAR national titles as an owner. Bobby Isaac won the pole position, and Richard Brickhouse won the race, his only career victory.

=== IndyCar ===
During the first open wheel "Split" between USAC and CART, the 1981 Pocono 500 was boycotted by most of the CART-based entries. USAC responded by filling out the field with Silver Crown cars. A rag-tag field of Indy cars and converted dirt-track cars ran a two-class race. Rain halted the race shortly after the halfway point, and the race was ended early. Among the filler drivers were Jack Hewitt and Larry Rice. The Silver Crown cars ran about 50 mph slower than the Indy cars, and when the race was called at lap 122 (of 200), the highest-running of the 8 Silver Crown cars was Mark Alderson, who was 18 laps down in 11th place to race winner A.J. Foyt, in what would turn out to be Foyt's last win in Indycar. It would be USAC's final Indy car race outside of the Indianapolis 500.

CART-based teams boycotted the 1996 Indianapolis 500 in the wake of the formation of the Indy Racing League, and the creation of the "25/8 rule," which they interpreted as a lockout by the IRL and the Indianapolis Motor Speedway. CART teams staged a competing race, the U.S. 500 at Michigan. Participants in the 1996 Indy 500 included several familiar Indy car teams such as Foyt, Dick Simon, and Menard. However, many of the drivers were inexperienced rookies from an obscure range of backgrounds, giving the impression of a field of replacement drivers. The 1996 Indy 500 entrants managed to fill the field to 33 cars, but only one car was bumped (then-unknown Billy Boat), and there was a post-WWII record 17 rookies. The field included such unknown drivers as Racin Gardner (land speed records), Brad Murphey (who was also a former bronco riding champion), Joe Gosek (supermodifieds), as well as Johnny Parsons and Danny Ongais; both of whom had not driven in the race since 1986.

== See also ==
- Strikebreaker
