= 2025 Green Bay Packers season =

105th season in franchise history

- Owner: Green Bay Packers, Inc.
- General manager: Brian Gutekunst
- Head coach: Matt LaFleur
- Home stadium: Lambeau Field

Results
- Record: 9–7–1
- Division place: 2nd NFC North
- Playoffs: Lost Wild Card Playoffs (at Bears) 27–31
- All-Pros: S Xavier McKinney (2nd team); DE Micah Parsons (1st team)
- Pro Bowlers: CB Keisean Nixon; DE Micah Parsons

Uniform
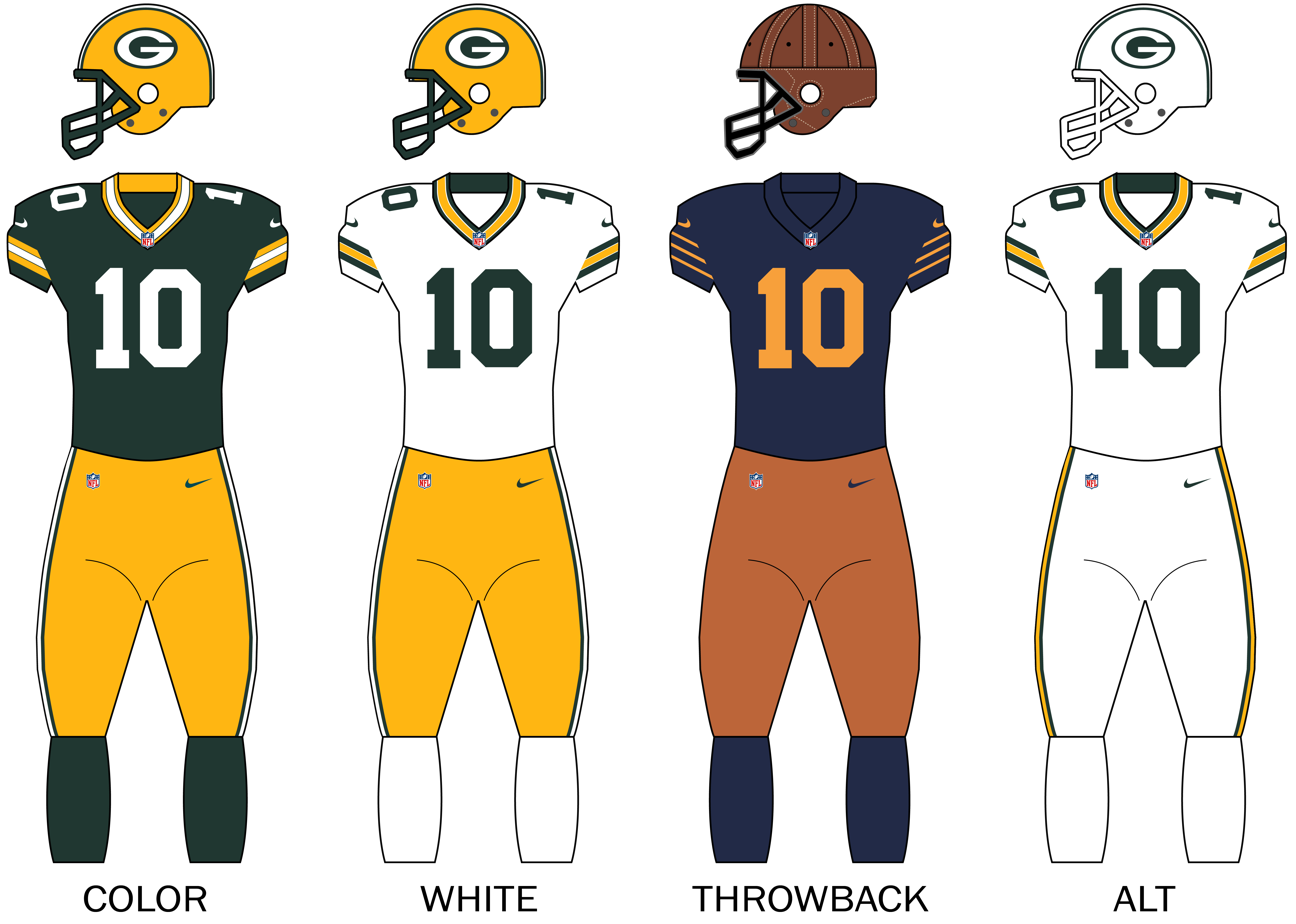

The 2025 season was the Green Bay Packers' 105th in the National Football League (NFL), their 107th overall, their eighth under the leadership of general manager Brian Gutekunst and their seventh under head coach Matt LaFleur. They failed to improve on their 11–6 record from last season, and for the fourth consecutive season failed to win the NFC North.

The Packers drafted a wide receiver in the first round of the NFL Draft for the first time since they drafted Javon Walker in 2002. This was the Packers' first season since 2015 and 2017 that Kenny Clark and Jaire Alexander, respectively, were not on the team's opening day roster, as Clark was traded to the Dallas Cowboys for Micah Parsons, while Alexander was released and signed with the Baltimore Ravens.

Following their Week 13 win over the Detroit Lions, the Packers clinched a third straight non-losing season, quarterback Jordan Love improved to 3–0 on Thanksgiving games and they additionally swept the Lions for the first time since 2020. A week 14 win over their longtime rivals, the Chicago Bears, gave the team their third straight winning season. The Packers clinched a playoff spot when the Lions lost to the Minnesota Vikings on Christmas Day, returning to the playoffs for the third year in a row.

After a 5–1–1 start, which saw them leading the NFC North and on a 3-game winning streak, the Packers lost back-to-back home games, the first of which they entered as two-touchdown favorites, only to be defeated by the Carolina Panthers and lose tight end Tucker Kraft to a torn ACL. The Packers managed a 4-game winning streak after to improve to 9–3–1, before also losing Parsons to a torn ACL during a Week 15 matchup against the Denver Broncos. Without Parsons, the Packers suffered through a late-season collapse, losing their last four games, resulting in them surpassing their loss total from the previous season. After falling to the Baltimore Ravens at home in Week 17, the Chicago Bears clinched the NFC North title, meaning that the Packers would enter the playoffs as the #7-seed in the NFC for the third consecutive season.

The Packers' late season woes continued as they headed into the playoffs, where they were eliminated in the Wild Card Round by the Bears by a final score of 31–27 after blowing a 21–3 halftime lead. This marks the second straight season in which the Packers went one-and-done in the first round of the playoffs. A report card by the NFL Players Association that was leaked to the public found the team to have the largest-ever single-season decline in their ratings system, dropping from 7th to 21st. The report card graded the team on factors such as head coach, treatment for families, and available player equipment.

The Green Bay Packers drew an average home attendance of 77,875, one of the highest of all American football teams in the world.

== Offseason ==
=== Trades ===
Date	Player incoming	Player outgoing
August 25	To Green Bay Packers; Darian Kinnard	To Philadelphia Eagles; 2027 sixth-round pick
August 28	To Green Bay Packers; Micah Parsons	To Dallas Cowboys; 2026 first-round pick 2027 first-round pick Kenny Clark

=== Free agents ===
Position	Player	Free agency tag	Date signed	2025 team
S	Zayne Anderson	ERFA	April 28	Green Bay Packers
CB	Corey Ballentine	UFA	March 14	Indianapolis Colts
TE	Tyler Davis	UFA	July 30	New England Patriots
OT	Andre Dillard	UFA	May 9	San Francisco 49ers
RB	A. J. Dillon	UFA	March 13	Philadelphia Eagles
TE	John FitzPatrick	RFA	April 14	Green Bay Packers
ILB	Isaiah McDuffie	UFA	March 3	Green Bay Packers
K	Brandon McManus	UFA	March 5	Green Bay Packers
WR	Bo Melton	ERFA	April 29	Green Bay Packers
DE	Arron Mosby	ERFA	April 7	Green Bay Packers
C	Josh Myers	UFA	March 13	New York Jets
CB	Robert Rochell	UFA	March 28	Kansas City Chiefs
DT	Tedarrell Slaton	UFA	March 13	Cincinnati Bengals
CB	Eric Stokes	UFA	March 13	Las Vegas Raiders
OT	Kadeem Telfort	ERFA	March 21	Green Bay Packers
P	Daniel Whelan	ERFA	April 29	Green Bay Packers
ILB	Eric Wilson	UFA	March 14	Minnesota Vikings
RB	Emanuel Wilson	ERFA	April 29	Green Bay Packers

=== Additions ===
Position	Player	Former team	Date
CB	Nate Hobbs	Las Vegas Raiders	March 13
G	Aaron Banks	San Francisco 49ers	March 18
WR	Mecole Hardman	Kansas City Chiefs	March 20
MLB	Kristian Welch	Baltimore Ravens	March 28
OLB	Isaiah Simmons	New York Giants	April 29
QB	Taylor Elgersma	Winnipeg Blue Bombers	May 12
WR	Jadon Janke	St. Louis Battlehawks	May 14
CB	Gregory Junior	Houston Texans	May 21
WR	Samuel Brown Jr	Miami Hurricanes	May 29
DT	Cameron Young	Seattle Seahawks	June 10
WR	Will Sheppard	Colorado Buffaloes	July 22
K	Mark McNamee	BC Lions	July 22
RB	Israel Abanikanda	San Francisco 49ers	July 22
CB	Garnett Hollis	Tennessee Titans	July 22
OLB	Jared Bartlett	New York Jets	July 30
CB	Corey Ballentine	Indianapolis Colts	August 4
G	Lecitus Smith	Pittsburgh Steelers	August 5
WR	Isaiah Neyor	San Francisco 49ers	August 6
RB	Tyrion Davis-Price	Tennessee Titans	August 12
WR	Kawaan Baker	Las Vegas Raiders	August 13
DT	Devonte O'Malley	Tennessee Titans	August 18
FS	Jaylin Simpson	New York Jets	August 18
LB	Nick Niemann	Houston Texans	August 27
OT	Brant Banks	Rice Owls	September 23
K	Lucas Havrisik	Arlington Renegades	October 11
MLB	Kristian Welch	Green Bay Packers	November 1
DE	Arron Mosby	Green Bay Packers	November 4
TE	Josh Whyle	Green Bay Packers	November 4
MLB	Kristian Welch	Green Bay Packers	November 11
WR	Will Sheppard	Green Bay Packers	November 26
DL	Jordon Riley	New York Giants	December 3
DL	Jonathan Ford	Chicago Bears	December 30
CB	Shemar Bartholomew	Green Bay Packers	December 30
CB	Jaylin Simpson	Green Bay Packers	December 30
S	Johnathan Baldwin	Green Bay Packers	December 31
QB	Clayton Tune	Green Bay Packers	December 31
CB	Trevon Diggs	Dallas Cowboys	January 1
WR	Jakobie Keeney-James	Green Bay Packers	January 3
G/C	Lecitus Smith	Green Bay Packers	January 3

=== Re-signings ===
Position	Player	Date
LB	Isaiah McDuffie	March 3
K	Brandon McManus	March 5
TE	John FitzPatrick	April 14
OT	Zach Tom	July 22
LS	Matt Orzech	August 26
P	Daniel Whelan	September 4
WR	Christian Watson	September 10

=== Subtractions ===
Position	Player	Date	2025 team
DT	Leonard Payne	April 28	
WR	Tulu Griffin	May 5	
G	Marquis Hayes	May 12	New York Jets
CB	Kaleb Hayes	May 21	Chicago Bears
DE	Jeremiah Martin	May 29	New Orleans Saints/Chicago Bears
WR	Jadon Janke	June 2	
CB	Jaire Alexander	June 9	Baltimore Ravens/Philadelphia Eagles
DT	Nesta Jade Silvera	July 18	Los Angeles Chargers
DT	Cameron Young	July 18	
K	Alex Hale	July 21	
S	Kahzir Brown	July 30	
CB	Gregory Junior	August 4	Denver Broncos
WR	Samuel Brown	August 5	
RB	Jalen White	August 12	
CB	Isaiah Dunn	August 12	
CB	Garnett Hollis	August 18	Buffalo Bills
DT	Keith Randolph Jr.	August 18	
WR	Kawaan Baker	August 25	
CB	Micah Robinson	August 27	Tennessee Titans
OT	Brant Banks	September 30	Tennessee Titans
TE	Ben Sims	October 25	Minnesota Vikings
LB	Kristian Welch	November 3	Green Bay Packers
K	Lucas Havrisik	November 26	
WR	Will Sheppard	December 1	

=== Draft ===
Green Bay hosted the draft this year at Lambeau Field. This was the first draft hosted by the franchise. The Packers drafted a wide receiver in the first round of the NFL Draft for the first time since 2002.

2025 Green Bay Packers draft selections
Round	Selection	Player	Position	College	Notes
1	23	Matthew Golden	WR	Texas	
2	54	Anthony Belton	OT	NC State	
3	87	Savion Williams	WR	TCU	
4	124	Barryn Sorrell	DE	Texas	
5	159	Collin Oliver	LB	Oklahoma State	
6	198	Warren Brinson	DT	Georgia	
7	237	Micah Robinson	CB	Tulane	from Steelers (Note: The Packers traded LB Preston Smith to the Pittsburgh Steelers in exchange for a seventh-round selection (237th overall).)
7	239	Traded to the Tennessee Titans (Note: The Packers traded a seventh-round selection (239th overall) to the Tennessee Titans in exchange for QB Malik Willis.)			
7	250	John Williams	OT	Cincinnati	Compensatory pick

Draft trades

=== Undrafted free agents ===
2025 Green Bay Packers undrafted free agents
Name	Position	College	Ref.
Johnathan Baldwin	CB	UNLV	
Brant Banks	OT	Rice	
Kahzir Brown	S	Florida Atlantic	
Samuel Brown	WR	Miami (FL)	
Tyler Cooper	G	Minnesota	
Taylor Elgersma	QB	Wilfrid Laurier	
Tyron Herring	CB	Delaware	
Amar Johnson	RB	South Dakota State	
Jamon Dumas-Johnson	LB	Kentucky	
J. J. Lippe	G	Northern Illinois	
Nazir Stackhouse	DT	Georgia	
Jalen White	RB	Georgia Southern	

=== Roster cuts ===
The roster was cut to 53 on August 26, 2025.

Position	Player	2025 team
RB	Israel Abanikanda	Green Bay Packers (Practice squad)
DE	Deslin Alexandre	Green Bay Packers (Practice squad)
CB	Johnathan Baldwin	Green Bay Packers (Practice squad)
CB	Corey Ballentine	New England Patriots (Practice squad)
OT	Brant Banks	Green Bay Packers (Practice squad)
OLB	Jared Bartlett	
QB	Sean Clifford	Cincinnati Bengals (Practice squad)
G	Tyler Cooper	
RB	Tyrion Davis-Price	Birmingham Stallions
QB	Taylor Elgersma	
DT	James Ester	
WR	Mecole Hardman	Buffalo Bills
CB	Tyron Herring	
WR	Julian Hicks	
C	Trey Hill	Chicago Bears (Practice Squad)
RB	Amar Johnson	
WR	Cornelius Johnson	Baltimore Ravens (Practice squad)
OLB	Jamon Johnson	
CB	Kalen King	Carolina Panthers (Practice squad)
G	JJ Lippe	
TE	Johnny Lumpkin	
K	Mark McNamee	Green Bay Packers (Practice squad)
DE	Arron Mosby	Green Bay Packers (Practice squad)
WR	Isaiah Neyor	Green Bay Packers (Practice squad)
DT	Devonte O'Malley	
WR	Will Sheppard	Green Bay Packers (Practice squad)
MLB	Isaiah Simmons	
S	Jaylin Simpson	Green Bay Packers (Practice squad)
C	Lecitus Smith	Green Bay Packers (Practice squad)
TE	Messiah Swinson	San Francisco 49ers (Practice squad)
OT	Kadeem Telfort	Miami Dolphins (Practice squad)
MLB	Kristian Welch	Green Bay Packers (Practice squad)

== Staff ==
2025 Green Bay Packers staff
Front office: Owner: Publicly held corporation; Executive committee – Board of directors; President/CEO – Ed Policy; General manager – Brian Gutekunst; Executive vice president/director of football operations – Russ Ball; Vice president of player personnel – Jon-Eric Sullivan; Director of player personnel – John Wojciechowski; Director of football operations – Milt Hendrickson; Director of college scouting – Matt Malaspina; Assistant director of college scouting – Patrick Moore; Director of pro personnel – Richmond Williams; Director of football administration – Melaine Marohl; National scouts – Sam Seale, Mike Owen; Director of performance psychology/team behavioral health clinician – Chris Carr; Director of player engagement – Grey Ruegamer; Player personnel executive – Lee Gissendaner; Head coaches: Head coach – Matt LaFleur; Assistant head coach/special teams coordinator – Rich Bisaccia; Offensive coaches: Offensive coordinator – Adam Stenavich; Passing game coordinator – Jason Vrable; Pass game specialist/game management – Connor Lewis; Quarterbacks – Sean Mannion; Running backs – Ben Sirmans; Wide receivers – Ryan Mahaffey; Tight ends – John Dunn; Offensive line – Luke Butkus; Assistant offensive line – Eddie Gordon; Senior assistant – Luke Getsy; Offensive assistant – Jeremiah Kolone; Offensive quality control – Rob Grosso	Defensive coaches: Defensive coordinator – Jeff Hafley; Defensive line/run game coordinator – DeMarcus Covington; Assistant defensive line – Vince Oghobaase; Linebackers – Sean Duggan; Passing game coordinator – Derrick Ansley; Defensive backs – Ryan Downard; Defensive analyst – Nathaniel Hackett; Defensive assistant – Jeff Koonz; Defensive quality control – Wendel Davis; Defensive quality control – Jamael Lett; Special teams coaches: Assistant special teams – Byron Storer; Special teams quality control – Cory Harkey; Strength and conditioning: Strength and conditioning coordinator – Aaron Hill; Strength and conditioning assistant – Marcus Jones; Strength and conditioning assistant – Ben Schumacher; Strength and conditioning assistant – Todd Hunt

== Final roster ==
2025 Green Bay Packers roster
Quarterbacks (QB): 10 Jordan Love; 18 Desmond Ridder; 2 Malik Willis; Running backs (RB): 30 Chris Brooks; 8 Josh Jacobs; 23 Emanuel Wilson; Wide receivers (WR): 87 Romeo Doubs; 0 Matthew Golden; 84 Jakobie Keeney-James; 11 Jayden Reed; 9 Christian Watson; 13 Dontayvion Wicks; Tight ends (TE): 88 Luke Musgrave; 81 Josh Whyle	Offensive linemen (OL): 65 Aaron Banks G; 71 Anthony Belton G/T; 70 Darian Kinnard T; 62 Jacob Monk C; 77 Jordan Morgan G/T; 75 Sean Rhyan C/G; 68 Lecitus Smith G; 50 Zach Tom T; 63 Rasheed Walker T; Defensive linemen (DL): 91 Warren Brinson DT; 94 Karl Brooks DT; 57 Brenton Cox Jr. DE; 55 Kingsley Enagbare DE; 64 Jonathan Ford DT; 52 Rashan Gary DE; 53 Arron Mosby DE; 99 Barryn Sorrell DE; 93 Nazir Stackhouse DT; 90 Lukas Van Ness DE; 96 Colby Wooden DT	Linebackers (LB): 56 Edgerrin Cooper MLB; 59 Ty'Ron Hopper OLB; 58 Isaiah McDuffie OLB; 31 Nick Niemann MLB; 45 Collin Oliver OLB; 7 Quay Walker OLB; Defensive backs (DB): 37 Johnathan Baldwin SS; 34 Shemar Bartholomew CB; 20 Javon Bullard SS/FS; 28 Trevon Diggs CB; 29 Xavier McKinney FS; 25 Keisean Nixon CB; 27 Kitan Oladapo FS; 38 Jaylin Simpson CB; 24 Carrington Valentine CB; 33 Evan Williams SS; Special teams (ST): 17 Brandon McManus K; 42 Matthew Orzech LS; 19 Daniel Whelan P	Practice squad: 72 Brant Banks G; 69 Dante Barnett DT (IPP); 61 Karsen Barnhart G; 68 Anthony Campbell DT; 47 McCallan Castles TE (PS/I); 78 Dalton Cooper T; 49 Drake Dabney TE; 48 Jamon Dumas-Johnson MLB; 98 James Ester DT; 35 Lucas Havrisik K; 46 Tyron Herring CB; 89 Julian Hicks WR; 6 Kisean Johnson WR; 26 Damien Martinez RB; 80 Isaiah Neyor WR; 41 Mark Perry FS; 82 Will Sheppard WR (PS/I); 22 Pierre Strong Jr. RB; 43 Messiah Swinson TE; Reserve: 39 Zayne Anderson SS (IR); 86 John FitzPatrick TE (IR); 79 Travis Glover G (IR); 36 Kamal Hadden CB (IR); 21 Nate Hobbs CB (IR); 74 Elgton Jenkins C (IR); 67 Donovan Jennings G (IR); 85 Tucker Kraft TE (IR); 32 MarShawn Lloyd RB (IR); 16 Bo Melton CB/WR (IR); 1 Micah Parsons DE (IR); 97 Jordon Riley DT (IR); 54 Kristian Welch MLB (IR); 73 John Williams T (PUP); 83 Savion Williams WR (IR); 95 Devonte Wyatt DT (IR); Rookies in italics 53 active, 16 reserve, 16 practice squad (3 exempt)

== Preseason ==
Week	Date	Opponent	Result	Record	Venue	Recap
1	August 9	New York Jets	L 10–30	0–1	Lambeau Field	Recap
2	August 16	at Indianapolis Colts	W 23–19	1–1	Lucas Oil Stadium	Recap
3	August 23	Seattle Seahawks	W 20–7	2–1	Lambeau Field	Recap

== Regular season ==
=== Schedule ===
The 2025 opponents were announced on January 6, 2025. On May 12, 2025, the NFL announced that the Packers would go on the road to face the division rival Chicago Bears on Saturday, December 20, 2025, as part of a double header that aired exclusively on Fox. On May 13, 2025, it was revealed that the Packers would be hosting the reigning Super Bowl champions Philadelphia Eagles on November 10, 2025, on Monday Night Football as a rematch of last season's NFC Wild Card Round game. The remainder of the schedule was announced on May 14, 2025.

Week	Date	Opponent	Result	Record	Venue	Recap
1	September 7	**Detroit Lions**	**W** 27–13	1–0	Lambeau Field	Recap
2	September 11	Washington Commanders	**W** 27–18	2–0	Lambeau Field	Recap
3	September 21	at Cleveland Browns	**L** 10–13	2–1	Huntington Bank Field	Recap
4	September 28	at Dallas Cowboys	**T** 40–40 (OT)	2–1–1	AT&T Stadium	Recap
5	Bye					
6	October 12	Cincinnati Bengals	**W** 27–18	3–1–1	Lambeau Field	Recap
7	October 19	at Arizona Cardinals	**W** 27–23	4–1–1	State Farm Stadium	Recap
8	October 26	at Pittsburgh Steelers	**W** 35–25	5–1–1	Acrisure Stadium	Recap
9	November 2	Carolina Panthers	**L** 13–16	5–2–1	Lambeau Field	Recap
10	November 10	Philadelphia Eagles	**L** 7–10	5–3–1	Lambeau Field	Recap
11	November 16	at New York Giants	**W** 27–20	6–3–1	MetLife Stadium	Recap
12	November 23	**Minnesota Vikings**	**W** 23–6	7–3–1	Lambeau Field	Recap
13	November 27	at **Detroit Lions**	**W** 31–24	8–3–1	Ford Field	Recap
14	December 7	**Chicago Bears**	**W** 28–21	9–3–1	Lambeau Field	Recap
15	December 14	at Denver Broncos	**L** 26–34	9–4–1	Empower Field at Mile High	Recap
16	December 20	at **Chicago Bears**	**L** 16–22 (OT)	9–5–1	Soldier Field	Recap
17	December 27	Baltimore Ravens	**L** 24–41	9–6–1	Lambeau Field	Recap
18	January 4	at **Minnesota Vikings**	**L** 3–16	9–7–1	U.S. Bank Stadium	Recap

Note: Intra-division opponents are in bold text.

=== Game summaries ===
==== Week 1: vs. Detroit Lions ====
Week 1: Detroit Lions at Green Bay Packers – Game summary

Quarter	1	2	3	4	Total
Lions	0	3	3	7	**13**
**Packers**	10	7	0	10	**27**

at Lambeau Field, Green Bay, Wisconsin

- Date: September 7
- Game time: 3:25 p.m. CDT
- Game weather: Cloudy, 60 °F (16 °C)
- Game attendance: 77,239
- Referee: Clete Blakeman
- TV announcers (CBS): Jim Nantz, Tony Romo and Tracy Wolfson
- Recap, Game Book

Game information

**First quarter**

- GB – Tucker Kraft 15-yard pass from Jordan Love (Brandon McManus kick), 9:26. Packers 7–0. **Drive: 12 plays, 83 yards, 5:34.**
- GB – Brandon McManus 34-yard field goal, 3:58. Packers 10–0. **Drive: 7 plays, 36 yards, 2:54.**

**Second quarter**

- DET – Jake Bates 30-yard field goal, 9:27. Packers 10–3. **Drive: 16 plays, 78 yards, 9:31.**
- GB – Jayden Reed 17-yard pass from Jordan Love (Brandon McManus kick), 8:34. Packers 17–3. **Drive: 2 plays, 65 yards, 0:53.**

**Third quarter**

- DET – Jake Bates 27-yard field goal, 9:40. Packers 17–6. **Drive: 9 plays, 59 yards, 5:20.**

**Fourth quarter**

- GB – Josh Jacobs 3-yard run (Brandon McManus kick), 7:57. Packers 24–6. **Drive: 8 plays, 36 yards, 4:43.**
- GB – Brandon McManus 38-yard field goal, 4:22. Packers 27–6. **Drive: 4 plays, 7 yards, 2:15.**
- DET – Isaac TeSlaa 13-yard pass from Jared Goff (Jake Bates kick), 0:55. Packers 27–13. **Drive: 13 plays, 65 yards, 3:27.**

**Top passers**

- DET – Jared Goff – 31/39, 225 yards, TD, INT
- GB – Jordan Love – 16/22, 188 yards, 2 TD

**Top rushers**

- DET – David Montgomery – 11 rushes, 25 yards
- GB – Josh Jacobs – 19 rushes, 66 yards, TD

**Top receivers**

- DET – Sam LaPorta – 6 receptions, 79 yards
- GB – Romeo Doubs – 2 receptions, 68 yards

The Packers started off their season strong by snapping a 2-game losing streak to the Lions, who they beat 27–13. They won their 13th straight home opener and defeated the Lions at home for the first time since 2021.

==== Week 2: vs. Washington Commanders ====
Week 2: Washington Commanders at Green Bay Packers – Game summary

Quarter	1	2	3	4	Total
Commanders	0	3	0	15	**18**
**Packers**	7	7	3	10	**27**

at Lambeau Field, Green Bay, Wisconsin

- Date: September 11
- Game time: 7:15 p.m. CDT
- Game weather: Cloudy, 64 °F (18 °C)
- Game attendance: 77,289
- Referee: Brad Rogers
- TV announcers (WGBA (Green Bay)/WITI (Milwaukee)/Prime Video): Al Michaels, Kirk Herbstreit and Kaylee Hartung
  Game exclusive to WGBA and WITI through syndication. Out of market on Prime Video.
- Recap, Game Book

Game information

**First quarter**

- GB – Romeo Doubs 5-yard pass from Jordan Love (Brandon McManus kick), 4:33. Packers 7–0. **Drive: 7 plays, 96 yards, 3:35.**

**Second quarter**

- GB – Josh Jacobs 2-yard run (Brandon McManus kick), 7:34. Packers 14–0. **Drive: 10 plays, 92 yards, 4:50.**
- WAS – Matt Gay 51-yard field goal, 4:27. Packers 14–3. **Drive: 9 plays, 37 yards, 3:07.**

**Third quarter**

- GB – Brandon McManus 22-yard field goal, 6:37. Packers 17–3. **Drive: 10 plays, 54 yards, 5:17.**

**Fourth quarter**

- WAS – Zach Ertz 20-yard pass from Jayden Daniels (Matt Gay kick), 13:45. Packers 17–10. **Drive: 11 plays, 50 yards, 4:46.**
- GB – Tucker Kraft 8-yard pass from Jordan Love (Brandon McManus kick), 8:57. Packers 24–10. **Drive: 9 plays, 65 yards, 4:48.**
- GB – Brandon McManus 56-yard field goal, 6:42. Packers 27–10. **Drive: 4 plays, 2 yards, 1:00.**
- WAS – Deebo Samuel 10-yard pass from Jayden Daniels (Jayden Daniels–Luke McCaffrey pass), 2:53. Packers 27–18. **Drive: 10 plays, 65 yards, 3:49.**

**Top passers**

- WAS – Jayden Daniels – 24/41, 200 yards, 2 TD
- GB – Jordan Love – 19/31, 292 yards, 2 TD

**Top rushers**

- WAS – Austin Ekeler – 8 rushes, 17 yards
- GB – Josh Jacobs – 23 rushes, 84 yards, TD

**Top receivers**

- WAS – Zach Ertz – 6 receptions, 64 yards, TD
- GB – Tucker Kraft – 6 receptions, 124 yards, TD

With the win, the Packers improved to 2–0.

==== Week 3: at Cleveland Browns ====
Week 3: Green Bay Packers at Cleveland Browns – Game summary

Quarter	1	2	3	4	Total
Packers	0	3	7	0	**10**
**Browns**	0	0	0	13	**13**

at Huntington Bank Field, Cleveland, Ohio

- Date: September 21
- Game time: 1:00 p.m. EDT/12:00 p.m. CDT
- Game weather: Cloudy, 79 °F (26 °C)
- Game attendance: 65,470
- Referee: Carl Cheffers
- TV announcers (Fox): Kevin Kugler, Daryl Johnston and Allison Williams
- Recap, Game Book

Game information

**First quarter**

- No scoring plays

**Second quarter**

- GB – Brandon McManus 39-yard field goal, 14:53. Packers 3–0. **Drive: 13 plays, 43 yards, 7:23.**

**Third quarter**

- GB – John FitzPatrick 3-yard pass from Jordan Love (Brandon McManus kick), 3:23. Packers 10–0. **Drive: 14 plays, 71 yards, 7:41.**

**Fourth quarter**

- CLE – Andre Szmyt 35-yard field goal, 3:38. Packers 10–3. **Drive: 12 plays, 63 yards, 5:48.**
- CLE – Quinshon Judkins 1-yard run (Andre Szmyt kick), 3:01. Tied 10–10. **Drive: 1 play, 4 yards, 0:07.**
- CLE – Andre Szmyt 55-yard field goal, 0:00. Browns 13–10. **Drive: 5 plays, 16 yards, 0:21.**

**Top passers**

- GB – Jordan Love – 18/25, 183 yards, TD, INT
- CLE – Joe Flacco – 21/36, 142 yards, INT

**Top rushers**

- GB – Josh Jacobs – 16 rushes, 30 yards
- CLE – Quinshon Judkins – 18 rushes, 94 yards, TD

**Top receivers**

- GB – Matthew Golden – 4 receptions, 52 yards
- CLE – David Njoku – 5 receptions, 40 yards

The Packers held a 10–0 lead with less than four minutes left in the fourth quarter, but ultimately lost to Joe Flacco and the Browns, 13–10. The Packers had a chance to take the lead on a late field goal by Brandon McManus, but the attempt was blocked. After recovering the blocked kick at the Browns 47 yard line, the Browns moved into Packers territory, where Andre Szmyt kicked the game-winning 55-yard field goal as time expired. With the upset loss, the Packers dropped to 2–1. The Packers also recorded their first road loss to the Browns since the 1992 season.

==== Week 4: at Dallas Cowboys ====
Week 4: Green Bay Packers at Dallas Cowboys – Game summary

Quarter	1	2	3	4	OT	Total
Packers	7	6	7	17	3	**40**
Cowboys	0	16	7	14	3	**40**

at AT&T Stadium, Arlington, Texas

- Date: September 28
- Game time: 7:20 p.m. CDT
- Game weather: None (retractable roof closed)
- Game attendance: 93,353
- Referee: Ron Torbert
- TV announcers (NBC): Mike Tirico, Cris Collinsworth and Melissa Stark
- Recap, Game Book

Game information

**First quarter**

- GB – Romeo Doubs 2-yard pass from Jordan Love (Brandon McManus kick), 10:02. Packers 7–0. **Drive: 8 plays, 69 yards, 4:58.**

**Second quarter**

- GB – Romeo Doubs 1-yard pass from Jordan Love (kick blocked), 10:37. Packers 13–0. **Drive: 9 plays, 68 yards, 5:41.**
- DAL – Blocked kick returned by Markquese Bell, 10:37. Packers 13–2.
- DAL – Dak Prescott 2-yard run (Brandon Aubrey kick), 0:41. Packers 13–9. **Drive: 11 plays, 95 yards, 5:09.**
- DAL – George Pickens 15-yard pass from Dak Prescott (Brandon Aubrey kick), 0:09. Cowboys 16–13. **Drive: 1 play, 15 yards, 0:04.**

**Third quarter**

- GB – Josh Jacobs 1-yard run (Brandon McManus kick), 7:08. Packers 20–16. **Drive: 9 plays, 76 yards, 5:25.**
- DAL – Jake Ferguson 8-yard pass from Dak Prescott (Brandon Aubrey kick), 0:34. Cowboys 23–20. **Drive: 12 plays, 80 yards, 6:34.**

**Fourth quarter**

- GB – Josh Jacobs 18-yard run (Brandon McManus kick), 11:39. Packers 27–23. **Drive: 8 plays, 70 yards, 3:55.**
- DAL – Javonte Williams 1-yard run (Brandon Aubrey kick), 4:50. Cowboys 30–27. **Drive: 14 plays, 77 yards, 6:49.**
- GB – Romeo Doubs 15-yard pass from Jordan Love (Brandon McManus kick), 1:45. Packers 34–30. **Drive: 10 plays, 80 yards, 3:05.**
- DAL – George Pickens 28-yard pass from Dak Prescott (Brandon Aubrey kick), 0:43. Cowboys 37–34. **Drive: 4 plays, 54 yards, 1:02.**
- GB – Brandon McManus 53-yard field goal, 0:00. Tied 37–37. **Drive: 7 plays, 39 yards, 0:43.**

**Overtime**

- DAL – Brandon Aubrey 22-yard field goal, 4:40. Cowboys 40–37. **Drive: 10 plays, 76 yards, 5:20.**
- GB – Brandon McManus 34-yard field goal, 0:00. Tied 40–40. **Drive: 13 plays, 64 yards, 4:40.**

**Top passers**

- GB – Jordan Love – 31/43, 337 yards, 3 TD
- DAL – Dak Prescott – 31/40, 319 yards, 3 TD

**Top rushers**

- GB – Josh Jacobs – 22 rushes, 86 yards, 2 TD
- DAL – Javonte Williams – 20 rushes, 85 yards, TD

**Top receivers**

- GB – Josh Jacobs – 4 receptions, 71 yards
- DAL – George Pickens – 8 receptions, 134 yards, 2 TD

During the first half, the Packers took an early 13–0 lead by way of two Romeo Doubs touchdowns, but the second extra point was blocked and returned by the Cowboys for a two-point score. The PAT block proved to be a momentum shift, and the Cowboys reduced the deficit to a 16–13 Packers lead at the half. The second half featured six lead changes. However, regulation ended tied 37–37 when Brandon McManus converted a 37-yard field goal with no time remaining.

In overtime, the Packers won the toss and elected to play defense. On the first possession of overtime, the Cowboys converted a 22-yard field goal with 4:40 remaining. During the Packers' first offensive possession in overtime, the offense moved the ball down to the Cowboys' 16-yard line. However, on 4th and 14 with only one second remaining, the Packers had to settle for another McManus field goal to end the game in a 40–40 tie.

This was the Packers' first tie since tying the Minnesota Vikings 29–29 in 2018. This is also the second-highest scoring tie of all time, behind the 43–43 tie between the Raiders and Patriots in 1964. This was also the first time the Packers failed to win in AT&T Stadium, as they are now 6–0–1 in the stadium.

With the tie, the Packers moved their record to 2–1–1, narrowly avoiding their third straight 2–2 start.

==== Week 6: vs. Cincinnati Bengals ====
Week 6: Cincinnati Bengals at Green Bay Packers – Game summary

Quarter	1	2	3	4	Total
Bengals	0	0	7	11	**18**
**Packers**	0	10	0	17	**27**

at Lambeau Field, Green Bay, Wisconsin

- Date: October 12
- Game time: 3:25 p.m. CDT
- Game weather: Sunny, 64 °F (18 °C)
- Game attendance: 78,277
- Referee: Brad Allen
- TV announcers (CBS): Kevin Harlan, Trent Green and Melanie Collins
- Recap, Game Book

Game information

**First quarter**

- No scoring plays

**Second quarter**

- GB – Lucas Havrisik 43-yard field goal, 14:15. Packers 3–0. **Drive: 12 plays, 71 yards, 7:24.**
- GB – Josh Jacobs 3-yard run (Lucas Havrisik kick), 4:05. Packers 10–0. **Drive: 8 plays, 80 yards, 4:07.**

**Third quarter**

- CIN – Tanner Hudson 2-yard pass from Joe Flacco (Evan McPherson kick), 4:46. Packers 10–7. **Drive: 17 plays, 78 yards, 10:14.**

**Fourth quarter**

- GB – Josh Jacobs 14-yard run (Lucas Havrisik kick), 14:56. Packers 17–7. **Drive: 9 plays, 66 yards, 4:50.**
- CIN – Evan McPherson 45-yard field goal, 10:43. Packers 17–10. **Drive: 9 plays, 50 yards, 4:13.**
- GB – Tucker Kraft 19-yard pass from Jordan Love (Lucas Havrisik kick), 7:33. Packers 24–10. **Drive: 6 plays, 62 yards, 3:10.**
- CIN – Ja'Marr Chase 19-yard pass from Joe Flacco (Joe Flacco–Chase Brown pass), 4:11. Packers 24–18. **Drive: 10 plays, 65 yards, 3:22.**
- GB – Lucas Havrisik 39-yard field goal, 1:52. Packers 27–18. **Drive: 7 plays, 41 yards, 2:19.**

**Top passers**

- CIN – Joe Flacco – 29/45, 219 yards, 2 TD
- GB – Jordan Love – 19/26, 259 yards, TD, INT

**Top rushers**

- CIN – Chase Brown – 9 rushes, 42 yards
- GB – Josh Jacobs – 18 rushes, 93 yards, 2 TD

**Top receivers**

- CIN – Ja'Marr Chase – 10 receptions, 94 yards, TD
- GB – Matthew Golden – 3 receptions, 86 yards

Coming off their bye week, the Packers welcomed the Joe Flacco-led Cincinnati Bengals. This would be the second time the Packers played against Joe Flacco, who was the starting quarterback for the Cleveland Browns in their week 3 matchup, before he was traded to the Bengals. Lucas Havrisik replaced starting Packers kicker Brandon McManus in the lineup due to injury.

The Bengals failed to score in the 1st half, and Green Bay led at halftime 10–0, by way of a Lucas Havrisik 43-yard field goal and a Josh Jacobs 3-yard touchdown run.

The Bengals started the 3rd quarter with a 78-yard, 10 minute and 14 second drive for a touchdown that reduced the lead to 3 points. However, the Packers would respond on the next possession, cap their drive with another Josh Jacobs touchdown run, this time from 14 yards. This would increase the Packers lead back to 10. After an Evan McPherson 45-yard field goal, the Packers responded again with a touchdown. This time a short pass from Jordan Love to Tucker Kraft was carried 19 yards into the end zone for the score. Ja'Marr Chase would then go on to score on a 19-yard pass from Joe Flacco with 4:11 to go in the fourth. With this score, the Bengals reduced the Packers' lead to 6 points. However, Lucas Havrisik would convert another field goal with 1:52 remaining in the 4th quarter to increase the Packers' lead to 9 making it a two score game with less than two minutes remaining. The Packers would go on to secure the win when Evan McPherson missed a 56-yard field goal with 46 seconds remaining in the game.

With their 3rd straight home win, the Packers improved to 3–1–1, while also now leading the series 8–7.

==== Week 7: at Arizona Cardinals ====
Week 7: Green Bay Packers at Arizona Cardinals – Game summary

Quarter	1	2	3	4	Total
**Packers**	0	6	7	14	**27**
Cardinals	3	10	7	3	**23**

at State Farm Stadium, Glendale, Arizona

- Date: October 19
- Game time: 3:25 p.m. CDT/1:25 p.m. MST
- Game weather: None (retractable roof closed)
- Game attendance: 64,810
- Referee: Alex Moore
- TV announcers (Fox): Kenny Albert, Jonathan Vilma and Jen Hale
- Recap, Game Book

Game information

**First quarter**

- ARI – Chad Ryland 32-yard field goal, 7:34. Cardinals 3–0. **Drive: 15 plays, 59 yards, 7:26.**

**Second quarter**

- GB – Lucas Havrisik 31-yard field goal, 9:06. Tied 3–3. **Drive: 9 plays, 67 yards, 4:20.**
- ARI – Chad Ryland 40-yard field goal, 5:02. Cardinals 6–3. **Drive: 8 plays, 49 yards, 4:04.**
- ARI – Trey McBride 15-yard pass from Jacoby Brissett (Chad Ryland kick), 0:07. Cardinals 13–3. **Drive: 9 plays, 71 yards, 2:57.**
- GB – Lucas Havrisik 61-yard field goal, 0:00. Cardinals 13–6. **Drive: 2 plays, 22 yards, 0:07.**

**Third quarter**

- GB – Josh Jacobs 7-yard run (Lucas Havrisik kick), 9:47. Tied 13–13. **Drive: 4 plays, 44 yards, 1:56.**
- ARI – Trey McBride 12-yard pass from Jacoby Brissett (Chad Ryland kick), 4:17. Cardinals 20–13. **Drive: 9 plays, 65 yards, 5:30.**

**Fourth quarter**

- GB – Tucker Kraft 7-yard pass from Jordan Love (Lucas Havrisik kick), 14:55. Tied 20–20. **Drive: 9 plays, 67 yards, 4:22.**
- ARI – Chad Ryland 39-yard field goal, 9:01. Cardinals 23–20. **Drive: 11 plays, 24 yards, 5:54.**
- GB – Josh Jacobs 1-yard run (Lucas Havrisik kick), 1:50. Packers 27–23. **Drive: 10 plays, 48 yards, 4:01.**

**Top passers**

- GB – Jordan Love – 19/29, 179 yards, TD
- ARI – Jacoby Brissett – 25/36, 279 yards, 2 TD

**Top rushers**

- GB – Josh Jacobs – 13 rushes, 55 yards, 2 TD
- ARI – Bam Knight – 14 rushes, 57 yards

**Top receivers**

- GB – Romeo Doubs – 6 receptions, 72 yards
- ARI – Trey McBride – 10 receptions, 74 yards, 2 TD

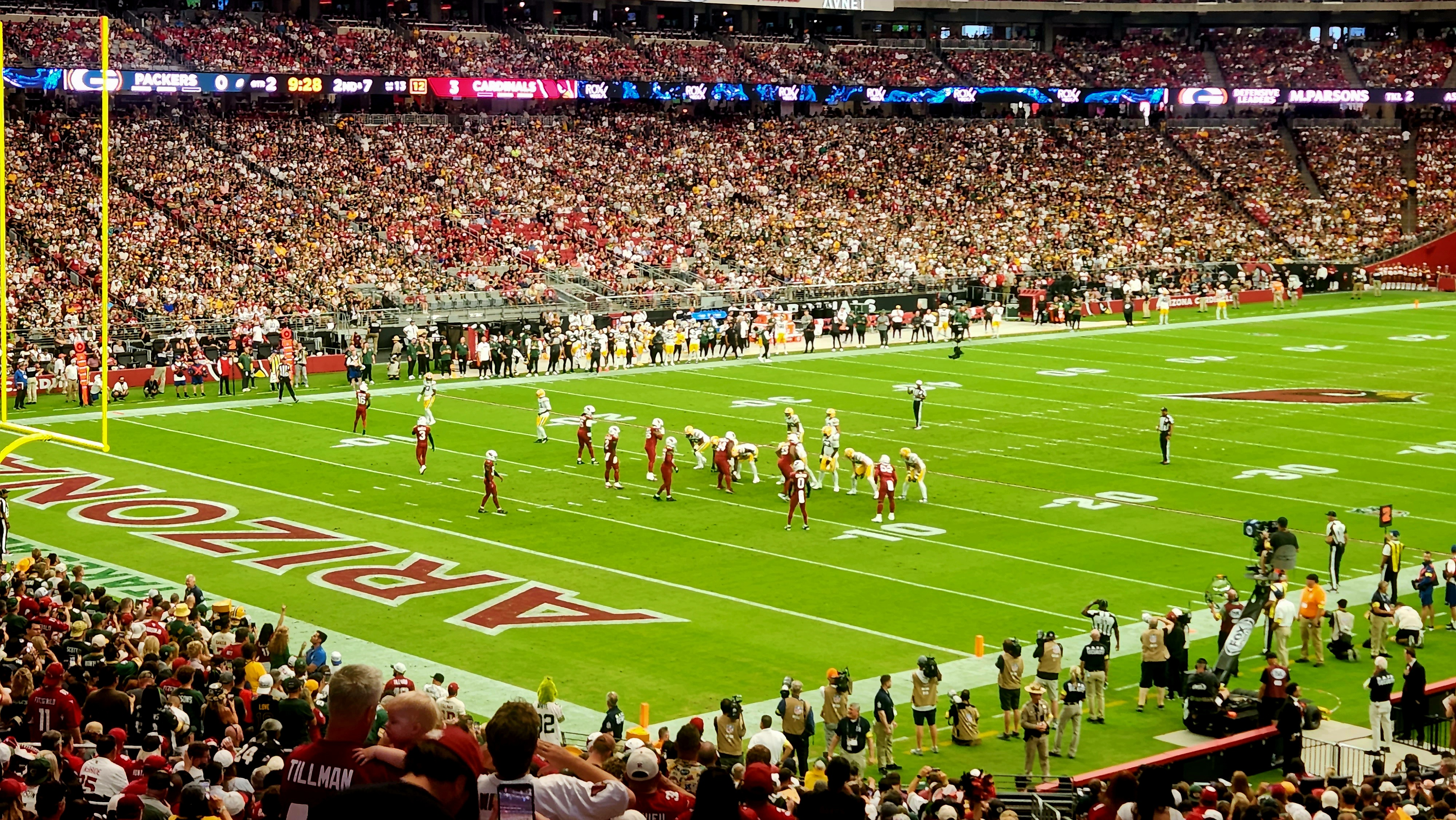
The Packers offense lining up against the Cardinals defense during the game

The Packers experienced a five-hour flight delay due to mechanical issues.

The Packers' offense sputtered through much of the first half. With just seven seconds remaining before halftime, Tight End Trey McBride extended Arizona's lead to 13–3 on a touchdown reception from Jacoby Brissett. However, the Packers responded quickly. On the next play, Jordan Love connected with Romeo Doubs for a 22-yard gain to the Arizona 43-yard line with just one second remaining. Kicker Lucas Havrisik then drilled a 61-yard field goal, the longest in Packers franchise history, to cut the deficit to 13–6 at the half. Green Bay tied the game at 13–13 in the third quarter with a 7-yard touchdown run by Josh Jacobs. McBride answered for Arizona, catching his second touchdown of the day to restore a 20–13 Cardinals lead.

Early in the fourth quarter, tight end Tucker Kraft hauled in a 7-yard touchdown pass from Love to even the score once again at 20–20. The Cardinals pulled ahead 23–20 on a 39-yard field goal by Chad Ryland with 9:01 remaining. With 2:32 left in the game, the Packers faced a fourth-and-2 at the Arizona 29-yard line and initially brought out the field goal unit. After a timeout, they opted to go for it. Love completed a short pass to Kraft for 14 yards down to the Cardinals' 15. Two plays later, Jacobs powered in his second touchdown of the day from one yard out, giving the Packers a 27–23 lead with two minutes remaining. The Cardinals mounted one final drive, reaching the Green Bay 27-yard line, but failed to convert on a fourth-and-11 pass attempt. The Packers took over on downs and ran out the clock to secure the win. With their 3rd straight win against the Cardinals since 2021 as well as their first road win of the season, the Packers improved to 4–1–1. Kicker Lucas Havrisik set a franchise record with his 61-yard field goal.

==== Week 8: at Pittsburgh Steelers ====
Week 8: Green Bay Packers at Pittsburgh Steelers – Game summary

Quarter	1	2	3	4	Total
**Packers**	7	0	7	21	**35**
Steelers	3	13	3	6	**25**

at Acrisure Stadium, Pittsburgh, Pennsylvania

- Date: October 26
- Game time: 8:20 p.m. EDT/7:20 p.m. CDT
- Game weather: Clear, 46 °F (8 °C)
- Game attendance: 67,386
- Referee: Shawn Hochuli
- TV announcers (NBC): Mike Tirico, Cris Collinsworth and Melissa Stark
- Recap, Game Book

Game information

**First quarter**

- PIT – Chris Boswell 56-yard field goal, 8:41. Steelers 3–0. **Drive: 7 plays, 42 yards, 4:45.**
- GB – Tucker Kraft 16-yard pass from Jordan Love (Brandon McManus kick), 5:05. Packers 7–3. **Drive: 6 plays, 67 yards, 3:36.**

**Second quarter**

- PIT – Chris Boswell 50-yard field goal, 12:18. Packers 7–6. **Drive: 6 plays, 21 yards, 2:32.**
- PIT – Chris Boswell 48-yard field goal, 5:52. Steelers 9–7. **Drive: 9 plays, 35 yards, 5:14.**
- PIT – DK Metcalf 2-yard pass from Aaron Rodgers (Chris Boswell kick), 0:34. Steelers 16–7. **Drive: 9 plays, 84 yards, 3:32.**

**Third quarter**

- GB – Savion Williams 8-yard pass from Jordan Love (Brandon McManus kick), 8:48. Steelers 16–14. **Drive: 9 plays, 90 yards, 5:13.**
- PIT – Chris Boswell 56-yard field goal, 5:34. Steelers 19–14. **Drive: 7 plays, 39 yards, 3:14.**

**Fourth quarter**

- GB – Josh Jacobs 3-yard run (Jordan Love–Romeo Doubs pass), 14:55. Packers 22–19. **Drive: 10 plays, 78 yards, 5:39.**
- GB – Tucker Kraft 24-yard pass from Jordan Love (Brandon McManus kick), 10:57. Packers 29–19. **Drive: 4 plays, 45 yards, 2:01.**
- GB – Brandon McManus 28-yard field goal, 5:28. Packers 32–19. **Drive: 8 plays, 47 yards, 3:28.**
- GB – Brandon McManus 25-yard field goal, 3:59. Packers 35–19. **Drive: 5 plays, 19 yards, 1:08.**
- PIT – Roman Wilson 21-yard pass from Aaron Rodgers (pass failed), 2:07. Packers 35–25. **Drive: 9 plays, 70 yards, 1:52.**

**Top passers**

- GB – Jordan Love – 29/37, 360 yards, 3 TD
- PIT – Aaron Rodgers – 24/36, 219 yards, 2 TD

**Top rushers**

- GB – Emanuel Wilson – 11 rushes, 61 yards
- PIT – Jaylen Warren – 13 rushes, 62 yards

**Top receivers**

- GB – Tucker Kraft – 7 receptions, 143 yards, 2 TD
- PIT – Roman Wilson – 4 receptions, 74 yards, TD

The Packers faced their former longtime quarterback Aaron Rodgers for the first time since he was traded in 2023. The Packers rallied in the second half, erasing a 16–7 halftime deficit by outscoring the Steelers 25–9 after the break on route to a 35–25 victory. Jordan Love, who spent three seasons as Rodgers’ backup, completed 29-of-35 passes, including a franchise record-tying 20 consecutive completions spanning the end of the first half and most of the second. He finished with 360 passing yards and three touchdowns.

The win ended the Packers' six-game road losing streak against the Steelers, beating them at Pittsburgh for the first time since the 1970 season. The result also prevented Rodgers from becoming the fifth quarterback in NFL history to defeat all 32 teams.

==== Week 9: vs. Carolina Panthers ====
Week 9: Carolina Panthers at Green Bay Packers – Game summary

Quarter	1	2	3	4	Total
**Panthers**	0	7	6	3	**16**
Packers	0	6	0	7	**13**

at Lambeau Field, Green Bay, Wisconsin

- Date: November 2
- Game time: 12:00 p.m. CST
- Game weather: Cloudy, 47 °F (8 °C)
- Game attendance: 77,864
- Referee: Land Clark
- TV announcers (Fox): Adam Amin, Greg Olsen and Pam Oliver
- Recap, Game Book

Game information

**First quarter**

- No scoring plays

**Second quarter**

- GB – Brandon McManus 49-yard field goal, 7:53. Packers 3–0. **Drive: 9 plays, 49 yards, 5:02.**
- CAR – Rico Dowdle 5-yard run (Ryan Fitzgerald kick), 2:22. Panthers 7–3. **Drive: 10 plays, 76 yards, 5:31.**
- GB – Brandon McManus 27-yard field goal, 0:00. Panthers 7–6. **Drive: 10 plays, 50 yards, 2:22.**

**Third quarter**

- CAR – Rico Dowdle 1-yard run (kick failed), 2:12. Panthers 13–6. **Drive: 8 plays, 38 yards, 4:15.**

**Fourth quarter**

- GB – Josh Jacobs 1-yard run (Brandon McManus kick), 2:01. Tied 13–13. **Drive: 12 plays, 71 yards, 4:52.**
- CAR – Ryan Fitzgerald 49-yard field goal, 0:00. Panthers 16–13. **Drive: 9 plays, 40 yards, 2:32.**

**Top passers**

- CAR – Bryce Young – 11/20, 102 yards, INT
- GB – Jordan Love – 26/37, 273 yards, INT

**Top rushers**

- CAR – Rico Dowdle – 25 rushes, 130 yards, 2 TD
- GB – Josh Jacobs – 17 rushes, 87 yards, TD

**Top receivers**

- CAR – Tetairoa McMillan – 4 receptions, 46 yards
- GB – Romeo Doubs – 7 receptions, 91 yards

Despite entering the game as two-touchdown favorites, the Packers struggled throughout their matchup with the Carolina Panthers. Although Green Bay managed to tie the game at 13–13, the Packers’ defense allowed the Panthers to march down the field and kick a game-winning 49-yard field goal, resulting in one of the biggest upsets of the NFL season and their first home loss of the season.

Following the game, the Packers announced that tight end Tucker Kraft would miss the remainder of the season after suffering a torn ACL in his right knee.

==== Week 10: vs. Philadelphia Eagles ====
Week 10: Philadelphia Eagles at Green Bay Packers – Game summary

Quarter	1	2	3	4	Total
**Eagles**	0	0	3	7	**10**
Packers	0	0	0	7	**7**

at Lambeau Field, Green Bay, Wisconsin

- Date: November 10
- Game time: 7:15 p.m. CST
- Game weather: Cloudy, 33 °F (1 °C)
- Game attendance: 78,254
- Referee: Clay Martin
- TV announcers (ESPN/ABC): Joe Buck, Troy Aikman, Lisa Salters and Laura Rutledge
- Recap, Game Book

Game information

**First quarter**

- No scoring plays

**Second quarter**

- No scoring plays

**Third quarter**

- PHI – Jake Elliott 39-yard field goal, 8:58. Eagles 3–0. **Drive: 10 plays, 50 yards, 6:02.**

**Fourth quarter**

- PHI – Devonta Smith 35-yard pass from Jalen Hurts (Jake Elliott kick), 10:35. Eagles 10–0. **Drive: 4 plays, 80 yards, 2:11.**
- GB – Josh Jacobs 6-yard run (Brandon McManus kick), 5:49. Eagles 10–7. **Drive: 11 plays, 75 yards, 4:46.**

**Top passers**

- PHI – Jalen Hurts – 15/26, 183 yards, TD
- GB – Jordan Love – 20/36, 176 yards

**Top rushers**

- PHI – Saquon Barkley – 22 rushes, 60 yards
- GB – Josh Jacobs – 21 rushes, 74 yards, TD

**Top receivers**

- PHI – Devonta Smith – 4 receptions, 69 yards, TD
- GB – Christian Watson – 2 receptions, 45 yards

In a rematch of last season's NFC Wild Card Round, the Packers were unable to get revenge on their rival and the defending Super Bowl LIX champions Eagles, despite entering the game as slim favorites. This game featured the first scoreless MNF first half since the 2009 matchup between the Cleveland Browns and the Baltimore Ravens.

Kicker Brandon McManus's 64-yard field goal attempt was missed wide left due to the windy conditions at Lambeau Field. With the loss, the Packers fell to 5–3–1 and finished 1–1 against Pennsylvania NFL teams.

==== Week 11: at New York Giants ====
Week 11: Green Bay Packers at New York Giants – Game summary

Quarter	1	2	3	4	Total
**Packers**	0	13	6	8	**27**
Giants	7	6	0	7	**20**

at MetLife Stadium, East Rutherford, New Jersey

- Date: November 16
- Game time: 1:00 p.m. EST/12:00 p.m. CST
- Game weather: Mostly cloudy, 55 °F (13 °C)
- Game attendance: 82,438
- Referee: Scott Novak
- TV announcers (Fox): Adam Amin, Drew Brees and Kristina Pink
- Recap, Game Book

Game information

**First quarter**

- NYG – Devin Singletary 5-yard run (Younghoe Koo Kick), 10:35. Giants 7–0. **Drive: 9 plays, 65 yards, 4:25**

**Second quarter**

- GB – Christian Watson 1-yard pass from Malik Willis (kick failed), 13:54. Giants 7–6. **Drive: 12 plays, 62 yards, 7:21**
- GB – Emanuel Wilson 11-yard run (Lucas Havrisik kick), 7:39. Packers 13–7. **Drive: 10 plays, 84 yards, 4:48**
- NYG – Devin Singletary 2-yard run (kick failed), 1:11. Tied 13–13. **Drive: 11 plays, 68 yards, 6:28**

**Third quarter**

- GB – Josh Whyle 2-yard pass from Jordan Love (kick failed), 11:40. **Packers 19–13. Drive: 6 plays, 66 yards, 3:20**

**Fourth quarter**

- NYG – Jameis Winston 1-yard run (Younghoe Koo kick), 7:22. Giants 20–19. **Drive: 15 plays, 85 yards, 7:59**
- GB – Christian Watson 17-yard pass from Jordan Love (Jordan Love–Emanuel Wilson pass), 4:02. Packers 27–20. **Drive: 7 plays, 65 yards, 3:20**

**Top passers**

- GB – Jordan Love – 13/24, 174 yards, 2 TD
- NYG – Jameis Winston – 19/29, 201 yards, INT

**Top rushers**

- GB – Emanuel Wilson – 11 rushes, 40 yards, TD
- NYG – Tyrone Tracy Jr. – 19 rushes, 88 yards

**Top receivers**

- GB – Romeo Doubs – 4 receptions, 53 yards
- NYG – Isaiah Hodgins – 5 receptions, 57 yards

With their first win over the Giants since 2019, the Packers improve to 6–3–1 and finished 2–1–1 against the NFC East.

==== Week 12: vs. Minnesota Vikings ====
Week 12: Minnesota Vikings at Green Bay Packers – Game summary

Quarter	1	2	3	4	Total
Vikings	3	3	0	0	**6**
**Packers**	7	3	7	6	**23**

at Lambeau Field, Green Bay, Wisconsin

- Date: November 23
- Game time: 12:00 p.m. CST
- Game weather: Cloudy, 43 °F (6 °C)
- Game attendance: 77,991
- Referee: Carl Cheffers
- TV announcers (Fox): Joe Davis, Greg Olsen and Pam Oliver
- Recap, Game Book

Game information

**First quarter**

- MIN – Will Reichard 52-yard field goal, 12:53. Vikings 3–0. **Drive: 7 plays, 31 yards, 2:07.**
- GB – Emanuel Wilson 1-yard run (Brandon McManus kick), 9:15. Packers 7–3. **Drive: 7 plays, 70 yards, 3:38.**

**Second quarter**

- GB – Brandon McManus 32-yard field goal, 2:25. Packers 10–3. **Drive: 14 plays, 68 yards, 8:01.**
- MIN – Will Reichard 59-yard field goal, 0:10. Packers 10–6. **Drive: 8 plays, 32 yards, 2:15.**

**Third quarter**

- GB – Emanuel Wilson 1-yard run (Brandon McManus kick), 10:53. Packers 17–6. **Drive: 2 plays, 5 yards, 0:44.**

**Fourth quarter**

- GB – Brandon McManus 30-yard field goal, 12:13. Packers 20–6. **Drive: 8 plays, 43 yards, 4:52.**
- GB – Brandon McManus 40-yard field goal, 7:36. Packers 23–6. **Drive: 5 plays, 19 yards, 2:41.**

**Top passers**

- MIN – J. J. McCarthy – 12/19, 87 yards, 2 INT
- GB – Jordan Love – 14/21, 139 yards

**Top rushers**

- MIN – Jordan Mason – 8 rushes, 42 yards
- GB – Emanuel Wilson – 28 rushes, 107 yards, 2 TD

**Top receivers**

- MIN – Justin Jefferson – 4 receptions, 48 yards
- GB – Christian Watson – 5 receptions, 49 yards

The Packers snapped their two-game losing streak against the Vikings with a strong defensive performance. With the Packers leading 10–6 in the third quarter, Zayne Anderson recovered a Myles Price muffed punt at the Vikings' five-yard line, a pivotal play in the game. Two plays later, Emanuel Wilson rushed for a one-yard touchdown, extending the Packers' lead to 11 points. The Packers defense dominated the Vikings in the second half, holding them to four net yards and forcing three turnovers. With the win, the Packers improved to 7–3–1.

==== Week 13: at Detroit Lions ====
Thanksgiving Day games

Week 13: Green Bay Packers at Detroit Lions – Game summary

Quarter	1	2	3	4	Total
**Packers**	3	14	14	0	**31**
Lions	0	14	7	3	**24**

at Ford Field, Detroit, Michigan

- Date: November 27
- Game time: 1:00 p.m. EST/12:00 p.m. CST
- Game weather: None (indoor stadium)
- Game attendance: 66,662
- Referee: Ron Torbert
- TV announcers (Fox): Kevin Burkhardt, Tom Brady, Erin Andrews and Tom Rinaldi
- Recap, Game Book

Game information

**First quarter**

- GB – Brandon McManus 45-yard field goal, 9:12. Packers 3–0. **Drive: 12 plays, 56 yards, 5:48**

**Second quarter**

- GB – Dontayvion Wicks 22-yard pass from Jordan Love (Brandon McManus kick), 14:19. Packers 10–0. **Drive: 9 plays, 77 yards, 4:07**
- DET – David Montgomery 3-yard run (Jake Bates Kick), 7:54. Packers 10–7. **Drive: 10 plays, 65 yards, 6:25**
- GB – Romeo Doubs 2-yard pass from Jordan Love (Brandon McManus Kick), 2:12. Packers 17–7. **Drive: 12 plays, 70 yards, 5:42**
- DET – Jameson Williams 22-yard pass from Jared Goff (Jake Bates Kick), 0:25. Packers 17–14. **Drive: 7 plays, 65 yards, 1:47**

**Third quarter**

- GB – Christian Watson 51-yard pass from Jordan Love (Brandon McManus Kick), 10:31. Packers 24–14. **Drive: 2 plays, 51 yards, 0:37**
- DET – Isaac TeSlaa 17-yard pass from Jared Goff (Jake Bates Kick), 7:25. Packers 24–21. **Drive: 5 plays, 71 yards, 3:06**
- GB – Dontayvion Wicks 1-yard pass from Jordan Love (Brandon McManus Kick), 1:44. Packers 31–21. **Drive: 9 plays, 72 yards, 5:41**

**Fourth quarter**

- DET – Jake Bates 31-yard field goal, 2:59. Packers 31–24. **Drive: 13 plays, 67 yards, 6:03**

**Top passers**

- GB – Jordan Love – 18/30, 234 yards, 4 TD
- DET – Jared Goff – 20/26, 256 yards, 2 TD

**Top rushers**

- GB – Josh Jacobs – 17 rushes, 83 yards
- DET – Jahmyr Gibbs – 20 rushes, 68 yards

**Top receivers**

- GB – Dontayvion Wicks – 6 receptions, 94 yards, 2 TD
- DET – Jameson Williams – 7 receptions, 144 yards, TD

With their third straight win on Thanksgiving, the Packers swept the Lions for the first time since 2020.

==== Week 14: vs. Chicago Bears ====
Week 14: Chicago Bears at Green Bay Packers – Game summary

Quarter	1	2	3	4	Total
Bears	0	3	11	7	**21**
**Packers**	0	14	7	7	**28**

at Lambeau Field, Green Bay, Wisconsin

- Date: December 7
- Game time: 3:25 p.m. CST
- Game weather: Sunny, 16 °F (−9 °C)
- Game attendance: 78,214
- Referee: Craig Wrolstad
- TV announcers (Fox): Kevin Burkhardt, Tom Brady, Erin Andrews and Tom Rinaldi
- Recap, Game Book

Game information

**First quarter**

- No scoring plays

**Second quarter**

- GB – Christian Watson 23-yard pass from Jordan Love (Brandon McManus kick), 9:19. Packers 7–0. **Drive: 11 plays, 80 yards, 5:50.**
- CHI – Cairo Santos 33-yard field goal, 1:14. Packers 7–3. **Drive: 14 plays, 59 yards, 8:05.**
- GB – Bo Melton 45-yard pass from Jordan Love (Brandon McManus kick), 0:38. Packers 14–3. **Drive: 4 plays, 60 yards, 0:36.**

**Third quarter**

- CHI – Olamide Zaccheaus 1-yard pass from Caleb Williams (Kyle Monangai run), 8:20. Packers 14–11. **Drive: 10 plays, 64 yards, 5:36.**
- GB – Christian Watson 41-yard pass from Jordan Love (Brandon McManus kick), 6:10. Packers 21–11. **Drive: 4 plays, 63 yards, 2:10.**
- CHI – Cairo Santos 41-yard field goal, 3:15. Packers 21–14. **Drive: 7 plays, 37 yards, 2:55.**

**Fourth quarter**

- CHI – Colston Loveland 1-yard pass from Caleb Williams (Cairo Santos kick), 8:00. Tied 21–21. **Drive: 17 plays, 83 yards, 8:32.**
- GB – Josh Jacobs 2-yard run (Brandon McManus kick), 3:32. Packers 28–21. **Drive: 8 plays, 65 yards, 4:28.**

**Top passers**

- CHI – Caleb Williams – 19/35, 186 yards, 2 TD, INT
- GB – Jordan Love – 17/25, 234 yards, 3 TD, INT

**Top rushers**

- CHI – D'Andre Swift – 13 rushes, 63 yards
- GB – Josh Jacobs – 20 rushes, 86 yards, TD

**Top receivers**

- CHI – Luther Burden III – 4 receptions, 67 yards
- GB – Christian Watson – 4 receptions, 89 yards, 2 TD

In the 211th meeting of the Bears–Packers rivalry, The Packers defeated the Ben Johnson-coached Chicago Bears at Lambeau Field. In a game-deciding play, Keisean Nixon intercepted Bears quarterback Caleb Williams’ pass in the end zone with 22 seconds remaining, preserving Green Bay’s 28–21 victory.

==== Week 15: at Denver Broncos ====
Week 15: Green Bay Packers at Denver Broncos – Game summary

Quarter	1	2	3	4	Total
Packers	3	13	7	3	**26**
**Broncos**	0	14	13	7	**34**

at Empower Field at Mile High, Denver, Colorado

- Date: December 15
- Game time: 3:25 p.m. CST/2:25 p.m. MST
- Game weather: Partly cloudy, 65 °F (18 °C)
- Game attendance: 75,555
- Referee: Brad Rogers
- TV announcers (CBS): Jim Nantz, Tony Romo and Tracy Wolfson
- Recap, Game Book

Game information

**First quarter**

- GB – Brandon McManus 53-yard field goal, 7:02. Packers 3–0. **Drive: 8 plays, 17 yards, 4:38.**

**Second quarter**

- GB – Brandon McManus 26-yard field goal, 14:11. Packers 6–0. **Drive: 10 plays, 89 yards, 5:45.**
- DEN – Michael Bandy 20-yard pass from Bo Nix (Wil Lutz kick), 8:19. Broncos 7–6. **Drive: 10 plays, 70 yards, 5:52.**
- GB – Josh Jacobs 14-yard pass from Jordan Love (Brandon McManus kick), 4:29. Packers 13–7. **Drive: 9 plays, 75 yards, 3:50.**
- DEN – Lil'Jordan Humphrey 5-yard pass from Bo Nix (Wil Lutz kick), 1:56. Broncos 14–13. **Drive: 6 plays, 72 yards, 2:33.**
- GB – Brandon McManus 35-yard field goal, 0:02. Packers 16–14. **Drive: 8 plays, 70 yards, 1:54.**

**Third quarter**

- GB – Josh Jacobs 40-yard run (Brandon McManus kick), 13:59. Packers 23–14. **Drive: 3 plays, 71 yards, 1:01.**
- DEN – Courtland Sutton 14-yard pass from Bo Nix (Wil Lutz kick), 9:07. Packers 23–21. **Drive: 7 plays, 71 yards, 3:39.**
- DEN – Troy Franklin 23-yard pass from Bo Nix (run failed), 0:00. Broncos 27–23. **Drive: 11 plays, 70 yards, 4:51.**

**Fourth quarter**

- GB – Brandon McManus 37-yard field goal, 10:55. Broncos 27–26. **Drive: 9 plays, 46 yards, 4:05.**
- DEN – RJ Harvey 4-yard run (Wil Lutz kick), 7:27. Broncos 34–26. **Drive: 9 plays, 65 yards, 3:28.**

**Top passers**

- GB – Jordan Love – 24/40, 276 yards, TD, 2 INT
- DEN – Bo Nix – 23/34, 302 yards, 4 TD

**Top rushers**

- GB – Josh Jacobs – 12 rushes, 73 yards, TD
- DEN – RJ Harvey – 19 rushes, 65 yards, TD

**Top receivers**

- GB – Jayden Reed – 5 receptions, 55 yards
- DEN – Courtland Sutton – 7 receptions, 113 yards, TD

The Packers entered the game as a one point favorite and led 23–14 in the third quarter, however the Broncos responded by outscoring the Packers 20–3 in the third quarter. The Packers would go onto lose 34–26, dropping to 9–4–1. They once again failed to win in Denver, not having done so since 2007.

Following the game, it was revealed that defensive end Micah Parsons tore his ACL in his left knee and would be out for the remainder of the season.

==== Week 16: at Chicago Bears ====
Week 16: Green Bay Packers at Chicago Bears – Game summary

Quarter	1	2	3	4	OT	Total
Packers	0	6	7	3	0	**16**
**Bears**	0	0	3	13	6	**22**

at Soldier Field, Chicago, Illinois

- Date: December 20
- Game time: 7:20 p.m. CST
- Game weather: Clear, 37 °F (3 °C)
- Game attendance: 60,152
- Referee: Alex Kemp
- TV announcers (Fox): Kevin Burkhardt, Tom Brady, Erin Andrews and Tom Rinaldi
- Recap, Game Book

Game information

**First quarter**

- No scoring plays

**Second quarter**

- GB – Brandon McManus 26-yard field goal, 12:45. Packers 3–0. **Drive: 14 plays, 70 yards, 6:06.**
- GB – Brandon McManus 22-yard field goal, 1:41. Packers 6–0. **Drive: 16 plays, 91 yards, 7:53.**

**Third quarter**

- CHI – Cairo Santos 46-yard field goal, 12:12. Packers 6–3. **Drive: 6 plays, 38 yards, 2:48.**
- GB – Romeo Doubs 33-yard pass from Malik Willis (Brandon McManus kick), 0:33. Packers 13–3. **Drive: 6 plays, 64 yards, 3:42.**

**Fourth quarter**

- CHI – Cairo Santos 51-yard field goal, 10:52. Packers 13–6. **Drive: 10 plays, 47 yards, 4:41.**
- GB – Brandon McManus 28-yard field goal, 5:03. Packers 16–6. **Drive: 10 plays, 53 yards, 5:49.**
- CHI – Cairo Santos 43-yard field goal, 1:59. Packers 16–9. **Drive: 11 plays, 43 yards, 3:04.**
- CHI – Jahdae Walker 6-yard pass from Caleb Williams (Cairo Santos kick), 0:24. Tied 16–16. **Drive: 8 plays, 53 yards, 1:35.**

**Overtime**

- CHI – D. J. Moore 46-yard pass from Caleb Williams, 4:50. Bears 22–16. **Drive: 4 plays, 64 yards, 1:20.**

**Top passers**

- GB – Malik Willis – 9/11, 121 yards, TD
- CHI – Caleb Williams – 19/34, 250 yards, 2 TD

**Top rushers**

- GB – Emanuel Wilson – 14 rushes, 82 yards
- CHI – D'Andre Swift – 13 rushes, 58 yards

**Top receivers**

- GB – Romeo Doubs – 5 receptions, 84 yards, TD
- CHI – D. J. Moore – 5 receptions, 97 yards, TD

The Packers lost quarterback Jordan Love to a concussion after he took a helmet-to-helmet hit from Chicago’s defensive end Austin Booker in the second quarter. In a defensive battle, Green Bay built a 16–6 lead when Brandon McManus kicked a 28-yard field goal with about five minutes remaining. The Bears responded by marching down the field and kicking a field goal just as the two-minute warning arrived. Chicago then recovered an onside kick, setting up a dramatic finish. Facing 4th-and-4 at the Packers’ 6-yard line, Bears quarterback Caleb Williams beat an all-out blitz and lofted a pass to a wide-open wide receiver Jahdae Walker in the right corner of the end zone to force overtime. In overtime, the Packers had 4th-and-1 at the Chicago 36, but backup quarterback Malik Willis fumbled the snap. On the ensuing Bears drive, Williams connected with wide receiver D. J. Moore for a 46-yard touchdown, completing a wild comeback victory.

The Packers lost to the Bears in Chicago for the first time since 2018.

==== Week 17: vs. Baltimore Ravens ====
Week 17: Baltimore Ravens at Green Bay Packers – Game summary

Quarter	1	2	3	4	Total
**Ravens**	7	20	0	14	**41**
Packers	7	7	10	0	**24**

at Lambeau Field, Green Bay, Wisconsin

- Date: December 27
- Game time: 7:00 p.m. CST
- Game weather: Cloudy, 36 °F (2 °C)
- Game attendance: 77,660
- Referee: Alan Eck
- TV announcers (Peacock): Noah Eagle, Todd Blackledge and Kathryn Tappen
- Recap, Game Book

Game information

**First quarter**

- BAL – Derrick Henry 3-yard rush (Tyler Loop kick), 6:55. Ravens 7–0. **Drive: 13 plays, 75 yards, 8:05.**
- GB – Christian Watson 39-yard pass from Malik Willis (Brandon McManus kick), 5:44. Tied 7–7. **Drive: 2 plays, 69 yards, 1:11.**

**Second quarter**

- BAL – Derrick Henry 1-yard rush (Tyler Loop kick), 13:13. Ravens 14–7. **Drive: 13 plays, 74 yards, 7:31.**
- BAL – Tyler Loop 22-yard field goal, 7:10. Ravens 17–7. **Drive: 8 plays, 30 yards, 4:10.**
- BAL – Tyler Loop 34-yard field goal, 3:36. Ravens 20–7. **Drive: 6 plays, 14 yards, 2:46.**
- GB – Malik Willis 22-yard rush (Brandon McManus kick), 1:24. Ravens 20–14. **Drive: 5 plays, 76 yards, 2:12.**
- BAL – Derrick Henry 3-yard rush (Tyler Loop kick), 0:10. Ravens 27–14. **Drive: 7 plays, 65 yards, 1:14.**

**Third quarter**

- GB – Brandon McManus 24-yard field goal, 9:10. Ravens 27–17. **Drive: 11 plays, 68 yards, 5:50.**
- GB – Malik Willis 11-yard rush (Brandon McManus kick), 2:02. Ravens 27–24. **Drive: 7 plays, 86 yards, 2:59.**

**Fourth quarter**

- BAL – Zay Flowers 10-yard pass from Tyler Huntley (Tyler Loop kick), 10:10. Ravens 34–24. **Drive: 12 plays, 85 yards, 6:52.**
- BAL – Derrick Henry 25-yard rush (Tyler Loop kick), 1:56. Ravens 41–24. **Drive: 10 plays, 68 yards, 5:00.**

**Top passers**

- BAL – Tyler Huntley – 16/20, 109 yards, TD
- GB – Malik Willis – 18/21, 288 yards, TD

**Top rushers**

- BAL – Derrick Henry – 36 rushes, 216 yards, 3 TD
- GB – Malik Willis – 9 rushes, 60 yards, 2 TD

**Top receivers**

- BAL – Zay Flowers – 4 receptions, 30 yards, TD
- GB – Christian Watson – 5 receptions, 113 yards, TD

Prior to this game being played, the Packers clinched their third consecutive playoff berth courtesy of the Minnesota Vikings knocking the Detroit Lions out of playoff contention.

Entering the contest as 3-point favorites, the Packers trailed 27–14 at halftime and added 10 more points in the third quarter to make it 27–24, but the Ravens pulled away with 14 unanswered points to win 41–24, dropping Green Bay to 9–6–1 on the season. This ensured a 5–3 home finish for the Packers, and also meant they finished 2–2 against the AFC North and 2–3 against the AFC. With the loss, the Chicago Bears clinched the NFC North division title, meaning that the Packers would enter the postseason as the NFC's No. 7 seed for the third straight season. The Packers once again failed to beat the Ravens at home, not having done so since 2009.

The Packers also became the first NFL team ever to lose three games in a season without a punt. The previous two occurrences were in Week 9 against the Panthers and seven days earlier at the Bears.

The Packers held out quarterback Jordan Love for this game due to his concussion the previous week. Malik Willis started at quarterback.

==== Week 18: at Minnesota Vikings ====
Week 18: Green Bay Packers at Minnesota Vikings – Game summary

Quarter	1	2	3	4	Total
Packers	0	0	0	3	**3**
**Vikings**	3	10	0	3	**16**

at U.S. Bank Stadium, Minneapolis, Minnesota

- Date: January 4
- Game time: 12:00 p.m. CST
- Game weather: None (indoor stadium)
- Game attendance: 66,606
- Referee: John Hussey
- TV announcers (CBS): Spero Dedes, Adam Archuleta and Aditi Kinkhabwala
- Recap, Game Book

Game information

**First quarter**

- MIN – Will Reichard 43-yard field goal, 10:27. Vikings 3–0. **Drive: 8 plays, 46 yards, 4:33.**

**Second quarter**

- MIN – Will Reichard 25-yard field goal, 3:02. Vikings 6–0. **Drive: 14 plays, 84 yards, 6:02.**
- MIN – C. J. Ham 1-yard run (Will Reichard kick), 0:23. Vikings 13–0. **Drive: 9 plays, 59 yards, 1:24.**

**Third quarter**

- No scoring plays

**Fourth quarter**

- MIN – Will Reichard 37-yard field goal, 4:09. Vikings 16–0. **Drive: 10 plays, 63 yards, 5:35.**
- GB – Brandon McManus 24-yard field goal, 0:00. Vikings 16–3. **Drive: 13 plays, 56 yards, 4:09.**

**Top passers**

- GB – Clayton Tune – 6/11, 34 yards
- MIN – J. J. McCarthy – 14/23, 182 yards

**Top rushers**

- GB – Chris Brooks – 13 rushes, 61 yards
- MIN – Jordan Mason – 14 rushes, 94 yards

**Top receivers**

- GB – Jakobie Keeney-James – 2 receptions, 15 yards
- MIN – Justin Jefferson – 8 receptions, 101 yards

With the seventh seed in the playoffs locked up and no ability to achieve a higher seeding, the Packers chose to rest a majority of their starters. The offense struggled to move the ball with third string quarterback Clayton Tune leading the offense. They only managed to score a field goal with no time remaining in the contest, ultimately losing 16–3.

With their fourth straight loss, the Packers finished their regular season at 9–7–1, 4–2 against the NFC North, and 4–4–1 on the road.

=== Standings ===
==== Division ====
NFC North
	W	L	T	PCT	DIV	CONF	PF	PA	STK
^{(2)} Chicago Bears	11	6	0	.647	2–4	7–5	441	415	L2
^{(7)} Green Bay Packers	9	7	1	.559	4–2	7–4–1	391	360	L4
Minnesota Vikings	9	8	0	.529	4–2	7–5	344	333	W5
Detroit Lions	9	8	0	.529	2–4	6–6	481	413	W1

==== Conference ====
NFC
Seed	Team	Division	W	L	T	PCT	DIV	CONF	SOS	SOV	STK
**Division leaders**
1	Seattle Seahawks	West	14	3	0	.824	4–2	9–3	.498	.471	W7
2 (Note: Chicago finished ahead of Philadelphia based on head-to-head victory.)	Chicago Bears	North	11	6	0	.647	2–4	7–5	.458	.406	L2
3	Philadelphia Eagles	East	11	6	0	.647	3–3	8–4	.476	.455	L1
4 (Note: Carolina finished ahead of Tampa Bay and Atlanta based on head-to-head record (Carolina 3–1 to Tampa Bay 2–2 and Atlanta 1–3).)	Carolina Panthers	South	8	9	0	.471	3–3	6–6	.522	.463	L2
**Wild cards**
5 (Note: LA Rams finished ahead of San Francisco based on common games (LA Rams 9–3 to San Francisco 8–4 against: Arizona, Atlanta, Carolina, Houston, Indianapolis, Jacksonville, New Orleans, Seattle, Tampa Bay and Tennessee).)	Los Angeles Rams	West	12	5	0	.706	4–2	7–5	.526	.485	W1
6	San Francisco 49ers	West	12	5	0	.706	4–2	9–3	.498	.417	L1
7	Green Bay Packers	North	9	7	1	.559	4–2	7–4–1	.483	.431	L4
**Did not qualify for the postseason**
8 (Note: Minnesota finished ahead of Detroit based on head-to-head sweep.)	Minnesota Vikings	North	9	8	0	.529	4–2	7–5	.514	.431	W5
9	Detroit Lions	North	9	8	0	.529	2–4	6–6	.490	.428	W1
10 (Note: Tampa Bay finished ahead of Atlanta based on common games (Tampa Bay 6–6 to Atlanta 5–7 against: Arizona, Buffalo, Carolina, LA Rams, Miami, New England, New Orleans, NY Jets, San Francisco and Seattle).)	Tampa Bay Buccaneers	South	8	9	0	.471	3–3	6–6	.529	.485	W1
11	Atlanta Falcons	South	8	9	0	.471	3–3	7–5	.495	.449	W4
12	Dallas Cowboys	East	7	9	1	.441	4–2	4–7–1	.438	.311	L1
13	New Orleans Saints	South	6	11	0	.353	3–3	4–8	.495	.333	L1
14	Washington Commanders	East	5	12	0	.294	3–3	3–9	.507	.388	W1
15	New York Giants	East	4	13	0	.235	2–4	2–10	.524	.478	W2
16	Arizona Cardinals	West	3	14	0	.176	0–6	3–9	.571	.422	L9
**Tiebreakers** (Note: When breaking ties for three or more teams under the NFL's rules, they are first broken within divisions, then comparing only the highest ranked remaining team from each division.)

== Postseason ==
=== Schedule ===
Round	Date	Opponent (seed)	Result	Record	Venue	Sources
Wild Card	January 10	at Chicago Bears (2)	L 27–31	0–1	Soldier Field	Recap

=== Game summaries ===
==== NFC Wild Card Playoffs: at (2) Chicago Bears ====
NFC Wild Card Playoffs: (7) Green Bay Packers at (2) Chicago Bears – Game Summary

Quarter	1	2	3	4	Total
Packers	7	14	0	6	27
Bears	3	0	3	25	31

at Soldier Field, Chicago, Illinois

- Date: January 10, 2026
- Game time: 7:00 p.m. CST
- Game weather: Mostly cloudy, 32 °F (0 °C)
- Game attendance: 60,338
- Referee: Adrian Hill
- TV announcers (WGBA (Green Bay)/WITI (Milwaukee)/Prime Video): Al Michaels, Kirk Herbstreit and Kaylee Hartung
  Game exclusive to WGBA and WITI through syndication. Out of market on Prime Video.
- Recap, Game Book

Game information

First quarter

- CHI – Cairo Santos 27-yard field goal, 7:02. Bears 3–0. Drive: 16 plays, 59 yards, 7:58.
- GB – Christian Watson 7-yard pass from Jordan Love (Brandon McManus kick), 2:06. Packers 7–3. Drive: 9 plays, 85 yards, 4:56.

Second quarter

- GB – Jayden Reed 18-yard pass from Jordan Love (Brandon McManus kick), 6:46. Packers 14–3. Drive: 10 plays, 87 yards, 5:37.
- GB – Romeo Doubs 1-yard pass from Jordan Love (Brandon McManus kick), 1:56. Packers 21–3. Drive: 8 plays, 32 yards, 3:19.

Third quarter

- CHI – Cairo Santos 34-yard field goal, 10:07. Packers 21–6. Drive: 8 plays, 48 yards, 3:46.

Fourth quarter

- CHI – Cairo Santos 51-yard field goal, 13:29. Packers 21–9. Drive: 7 plays, 2 yards, 2:06.
- CHI – D'Andre Swift 5-yard run (Cairo Santos kick), 10:08. Packers 21–16. Drive: 7 plays, 66 yards, 2:30.
- GB – Matthew Golden 23-yard pass from Jordan Love (kick failed), 6:36. Packers 27–16. Drive: 7 plays, 46 yards, 1:34.
- CHI – Olamide Zaccheaus 8-yard pass from Caleb Williams (Caleb Williams–Colston Loveland), 4:18. Packers 27–24. Drive: 10 plays, 76 yards, 2:18.
- CHI – D. J. Moore 25-yard pass from Caleb Williams (Cairo Santos kick), 1:43. Bears 31–27. Drive: 6 plays, 66 yards, 1:08.

Top passers

- GB – Jordan Love – 24/46, 323 yards, 4 TD
- CHI – Caleb Williams – 24/48, 361 yards, 2 TD, 2 INT

Top rushers

- GB – Josh Jacobs – 19 rushes, 55 yards
- CHI – D'Andre Swift – 13 rushes, 54 yards, TD

Top receivers

- GB – Romeo Doubs – 8 receptions, 124 yards, TD
- CHI – Colston Loveland – 8 receptions, 137 yards

This was a rubber match between these two longtime rivals, as well as the third playoff meeting in the series, having previously met each other in the 2010 NFC Championship Game, with the Packers winning 21–14, en route to winning Super Bowl XLV.

Although the Packers entered the game as 1.5 point favorites, they ultimately blew a 21–6 fourth quarter lead, were outscored 28–6 in the second half, and lost 31–27 when Jordan Love's fourth down pass was broken up in the end zone. This was the fourth time a team lost in the playoffs after leading by 15+ points, and the most recent since the Kansas City Chiefs blew a 21–3 lead against the Cincinnati Bengals during the 2021–22 AFC Championship Game.

With their franchise-record third consecutive playoff loss, the Packers' season came to an end with their first playoff loss to Chicago since 1941.

== Statistics ==
=== Starters ===
==== Regular season ====
Offense

Pos.	Name	GS
QB	Jordan Love; Clayton Tune; Malik Willis	15; 1; 1
RB	Josh Jacobs; Emanuel Wilson	15; 2
WR	Romeo Doubs; Bo Melton; Dontayvion Wicks	15; 1; 1
WR2	Christian Watson; Matthew Golden; Dontayvion Wicks; Jayden Reed	8; 5; 3; 1
WR3	Dontayvion Wicks; Jayden Reed; Christian Watson; Jakobie Keeney-James	3; 2; 2; 1
TE	Tucker Kraft; Luke Musgrave; John Fitzpatrick; Drake Dabney	8; 5; 2; 1
TE2	Luke Musgrave; John Fitzpatrick; Josh Whyle	5; 2; 1
LT	Rasheed Walker; Jordan Morgan	16; 1
LG	Aaron Banks; Jordan Morgan; Lecitus Smith	14; 2; 1
C	Elgton Jenkins; Sean Rhyan; Jacob Monk	10; 6; 1
RG	Jordan Morgan; Anthony Belton; Sean Rhyan	7; 6; 4
RT	Zach Tom; Jordan Morgan; Darian Kinnard; Anthony Belton	12; 2; 2; 1
T	Darian Kinnard	1

Defense

Pos.	Name	GS
DE1	Rashan Gary; Kingsley Enagbare; Barryn Sorrell	15; 1; 1
DT1	Devonte Wyatt; Karl Brooks; Nazir Stackhouse	10; 6; 1
DT2	Colby Wooden; Warren Brinson	16; 1
DT3/DL	Karl Brooks; Lukas Van Ness	1; 1
DE2	Micah Parsons; Kingsley Enagbare; Brenton Cox Jr.	14; 2; 1
LB1	Quay Walker; Isaiah McDuffie	14; 3
LB2	Edgerrin Cooper; Ty'Ron Hopper	16; 1
LB3	Isaiah McDuffie; Ty'Ron Hopper; Jamon Dumas-Johnson	9; 1; 1
CB	Keisean Nixon	17
CB2	Carrington Valentine; Nate Hobbs; Trevon Diggs	11; 5; 1
S	Xavier McKinney; Javon Bullard	16; 1
S2	Evan Williams; Javon Bullard	15; 2
S3	Javon Bullard	4

==== Postseason ====
Offense

Pos.	Name	GS
QB	Jordan Love	1
RB	Josh Jacobs	1
WR	Romeo Doubs	1
WR2	Christian Watson	1
WR3	Jayden Reed	1
TE	Luke Musgrave	1
LT	Rasheed Walker	1
LG	Aaron Banks	1
C	Sean Rhyan	1
RG	Anthony Belton	1
RT	Jordan Morgan	1

Defense

Pos.	Name	GS
DE	Rashan Gary	1
DT	Karl Brooks	1
DT	Colby Wooden	1
DE	Kingsley Enagbare	1
LB1	Quay Walker	1
LB2	Edgerrin Cooper	1
CB	Keisean Nixon	1
CB2	Carrington Valentine	1
S	Xavier McKinney	1
S2	Evan Williams	1
S3	Javon Bullard	1

=== Team leaders ===
Category	Player(s)	Value
Passing yards	Jordan Love	3,381
Passing touchdowns	Jordan Love	23
Rushing yards	Josh Jacobs	929
Rushing touchdowns	Josh Jacobs	13
Receptions	Romeo Doubs	55
Receiving yards	Romeo Doubs	724
Receiving touchdowns	Romeo Doubs; Tucker Kraft; Christian Watson	6
Kickoff return yards	Savion Williams	717
Punt return yards	Romeo Doubs	94
Tackles	Quay Walker	128
Sacks	Micah Parsons	12.5
Interceptions	Evan Williams	3

=== League rankings ===
Category	Total yards	Yards per game	NFL rank (out of 32)
Passing offense	3,617	212.8	17th
Rushing offense	2,037	119.8	15th
Total offense	5,654	332.6	15th
Passing defense	3,300	194.1	11th
Rushing defense	2,001	117.7	18th
Total defense	5,301	311.8	12th

Category	Total points	Points per game	NFL rank (out of 32)
Offensive points scored	391	23.0	16th
Defensive points allowed	360	21.2	11th

Statistical values are correct through January 4, 2026

== Awards ==
Recipient	Award(s)
Jordan Love	Week 8: NFC Offensive Players of the Week; Week 8: FedEx Air & Ground Players of the Week; Week 13: NFC Offensive Players of the Week; Week 13: FedEx Air & Ground Players of the Week
Keisean Nixon	2026 Pro Bowl Games
Micah Parsons	Week 7: NFC Defensive Player of the Week; October: NFC Defensive Player of the Month; 2026 Pro Bowl Games
Emanuel Wilson	Week 12: FedEx Air & Ground Players of the Week
