= Jakobie Keeney-James =

American football player (born 2000)

Profile
- Position: Wide receiver

Personal information
- Born: September 26, 2000 (age 26); Las Vegas, Nevada, U.S.
- Listed height: 6 ft 0 in (1.83 m)
- Listed weight: 190 lb (86 kg)

Career information
- High school: Redlands (CA)
- College: Eastern Washington (2019–2023); UMass (2024)
- NFL draft: 2025: undrafted

Career history
- Detroit Lions (2025)*; Green Bay Packers (2025); Pittsburgh Steelers (2026)*
- * Offseason or practice squad member only

Career NFL statistics as of 2025
- Receptions: 2
- Receiving yards: 15
- Return yards: 47
- Stats at Pro Football Reference

Jakobie Keeney-James (born September 26, 2000) is an American professional football wide receiver. He played college football for the Eastern Washington Eagles and UMass Minutemen and was signed by the Detroit Lions as an undrafted free agent in 2025.

== Early life and college career ==
Keeney-James was born on September 26, 2000, in Las Vegas, Nevada. He became interested in football after a visit to the Pro Football Hall of Fame in the early 2010s. He attended Redlands High School in California where he played as a wide receiver and also competed in track and field. He was named first-team All-Citrus Belt League in his last two years and posted 560 receiving yards and five receiving touchdowns as a junior. An unranked recruit, he signed to play college football for the NCAA Division I FCS-level Eastern Washington Eagles.

Keeney-James redshirted as a true freshman at Eastern Washington in 2019, appearing in three games and catching a pass. He had 10 receptions for 125 yards in six games during the 2020–21 season, 17 catches for 246 yards and three touchdowns in 2022, and 18 catches for 228 yards and a touchdown in 2022. Keeney-James then missed most of the 2023 season due to injury. He transferred to the UMass Minutemen for his final season in 2024, concluding his stint at Eastern Washington with 825 receiving yards. In his lone year at UMass, he totaled 50 catches for 839 yards and six touchdowns. Keeney-James concluded his collegiate career with 49 games played, posting 111 catches for 1,664 yards and 10 touchdowns.

== Professional career ==
Pre-draft measurables
Height	Weight	Arm length	Hand span	Wingspan	40-yard dash	10-yard split	20-yard split	20-yard shuttle	Three-cone drill	Vertical jump	Broad jump	Bench press
5 ft 11 1/2 in (1.82 m)	190 lb (86 kg)	31 3/4 in (0.81 m)	9 3/4 in (0.25 m)	6 ft 3 1/2 in (1.92 m)	4.37 s	1.54 s	2.59 s	4.07 s	6.88 s	40.5 in (1.03 m)	10 ft 6 in (3.20 m)	17 reps
All values from Pro Day

=== Detroit Lions ===
After going unselected in the 2025 NFL draft, Keeney-James signed with the Detroit Lions as an undrafted free agent. He was waived on August 26 as part of final roster cuts.

=== Green Bay Packers ===
On September 23, 2025, Keeney-James was signed to the practice squad of the Green Bay Packers. On January 3, 2026, prior to the team's regular season finale against the Minnesota Vikings, he was signed to the active roster. He had two receptions for 15 yards and returned two kicks in his NFL debut.

On June 15, 2026, Keeney-James was released by the Packers.

=== Pittsburgh Steelers ===
On August 4, 2026, Keeney-James signed with the Pittsburgh Steelers. On August 28, he was waived by Pittsburgh.

== Career statistics ==
=== NFL ===
==== Regular season ====
NFL regular season statistics
Year	Team	Games		Receiving					Rushing					Fumbles	
Year	Team	GP	GS	Rec	Yds	Avg	Lng	TD	Att	Yds	Avg	Lng	TD	Fum	Lost
2025	GB	1	1	2	15	7.5	8	0	0	0	0.0	0	0	0	0
Career		1	1	2	15	7.5	8	0	0	0	0.0	0	0	0	0
Source: pro-football-reference.com
