= Shemar Bartholomew =

American football player (born 2000)

No. 39 – Indianapolis Colts
- Position: Cornerback
- Roster status: Practice squad

Personal information
- Born: June 6, 2000 (age 26); New Orleans, Louisiana, U.S.
- Listed height: 6 ft 0 in (1.83 m)
- Listed weight: 200 lb (91 kg)

Career information
- High school: Cypress Ranch (Cypress, Texas)
- College: Northwestern State (2018–2022); Georgia Southern (2023)
- NFL draft: 2024: undrafted

Career history
- New York Jets (2024)*; Carolina Panthers (2024–2025); Minnesota Vikings (2025)*; Green Bay Packers (2025); Tennessee Titans (2026)*; Indianapolis Colts (2026–present)*
- * Offseason or practice squad member only

Awards and highlights
- Second-team All-Sun Belt (2023)

Career NFL statistics as of 2025
- Total tackles: 7
- Pass deflections: 2
- Stats at Pro Football Reference

Shemar Bartholomew (born June 6, 2000) is an American professional football cornerback for the Indianapolis Colts of the National Football League (NFL). He played college football for the Northwestern State Demons and Georgia Southern Eagles and was previously a member of the New York Jets and Carolina Panthers.

== Early life ==
Bartholomew was born on June 6, 2000, in New Orleans, Louisiana, and has six siblings. He attended Cypress Ranch High School in Texas, being a cornerback for three years on the varsity football team. He helped the school win playoff games in his final two years and totaled 40 tackles, five interceptions and 12 pass breakups as a senior. He graduated from Cypress Ranch with a grade-point average (GPA) of 4.34 and committed to play college football for the NCAA Division I FCS Northwestern State Demons.

== College career ==
As a freshman at Northwestern State in 2018, Bartholomew appeared in eight games, three as a starter, and recorded 14 tackles, three pass breakups and two interceptions. He played in nine games, six as a starter, during the 2019 season, recording 26 tackles and four interceptions, including one returned 96 yards for a touchdown. He was named a third-team All-Southland Conference (SLC) performer and an honorable mention sophomore All-American by HERO Sports. He appeared in three games, posting three tackles and an interception, in the spring 2021 season. He started nine games in the fall 2021 season and led the team with six pass breakups, being named second-team All-SLC at the end of the season.

Bartholomew redshirted after having appeared in one game during the 2022 season, then transferred to the Georgia Southern Eagles for the 2023 season. He appeared in 13 games, five as a starter, and made 38 tackles, 2.5 tackles-for-loss (TFLs), 14 pass breakups and one interception, being named second-team All-Sun Belt Conference.

== Professional career ==
Pre-draft measurables
Height	Weight	Arm length	Hand span	Wingspan	40-yard dash	10-yard split	20-yard split	20-yard shuttle	Three-cone drill	Vertical jump	Broad jump	Bench press
6 ft 0 1/4 in (1.84 m)	200 lb (91 kg)	31 in (0.79 m)	9 in (0.23 m)	6 ft 1 5/8 in (1.87 m)	4.45 s	1.53 s	2.50 s	4.45 s	7.16 s	36.5 in (0.93 m)	10 ft 3 in (3.12 m)	15 reps
All values from Pro Day

=== New York Jets ===
After going unselected in the 2024 NFL draft, Bartholomew was signed by the New York Jets as an undrafted free agent. He was a standout in preseason, allowing no receiving yards on nine targets. He was waived on August 29, 2024.

=== Carolina Panthers ===
On August 28, 2024, Bartholomew was claimed off waivers by the Carolina Panthers. He had been the most in demand player on waivers, with four teams putting in a claim for him.

Bartholomew was waived on August 26, 2025, and re-signed to the practice squad, but released the next day.

=== Minnesota Vikings ===
On November 11, 2025, Bartholomew was signed to the Minnesota Vikings' practice squad. He was released by the Vikings on November 25.

=== Green Bay Packers ===
On December 2, 2025, Bartholomew was signed to the Green Bay Packers' practice squad. He was promoted to the active roster on December 30.

On August 30, 2026, Bartholomew was released by the Packers as a part of final roster cuts.

=== Tennessee Titans ===
On September 1, 2026, Bartholomew signed with the Tennessee Titans' practice squad. He was released by Tennessee on September 15.

=== Indianapolis Colts ===
On October 27, 2026, Bartholomew signed with the Indianapolis Colts' practice squad.

== NFL career statistics ==
Legend
**Bold**	Career high

=== Regular season ===
Year	Team	Games		Tackles					Interceptions						Fumbles	
Year	Team	GP	GS	Cmb	Solo	Ast	TFL	Sck	PD	Int	Yds	Avg	Lng	TD	FF	FR
2024	CAR	**5**	0	3	2	**1**	1	0.0	**2**	0	0	0	0	0	0	0
2025	GB	1	0	**4**	**4**	0	1	0.0	0	0	0	0	0	0	0	0
Career		6	0	7	6	1	2	0.0	2	0	0	0	0	0	0	0
Source: pro-football-reference.com
