= Johnathan Baldwin =

American football player (born 2003)

Profile
- Position: Safety

Personal information
- Born: February 8, 2003 (age 23); Houston, Texas, U.S.
- Listed height: 6 ft 0 in (1.83 m)
- Listed weight: 190 lb (86 kg)

Career information
- High school: Dobie (Houston, Texas)
- College: UNLV (2021–2024)
- NFL draft: 2025: undrafted

Career history
- Green Bay Packers (2025)

Awards and highlights
- Second team All-MWC (2024)

Career NFL statistics as of 2025
- Total tackles: 7
- Stats at Pro Football Reference

Johnathan Keith Baldwin II (born February 8, 2003) is an American professional football safety. He played college football for the UNLV Rebels.

== Early life and college career ==
Baldwin was born on February 8, 2003, in Houston, Texas. He attended Dobie High School in Houston where he played football for four years and also played basketball. In football, he posted 48 tackles and an interception as a sophomore and 40 tackles and two interceptions as a junior. He recorded two interceptions as a senior and also ran for 1,053 yards, scoring 18 touchdowns, in the 2020 season. He was named the 22-6A District MVP for his performance. Baldwin committed to play college football for the UNLV Rebels.

Baldwin was a backup as a true freshman at UNLV in 2021 before becoming a starting safety in 2022. He recorded 10 tackles in 2021 and 56 tackles, along with a team-best seven pass breakups, in 2022, followed by 77 tackles in 2023. As a senior in 2024, Baldwin was named second-team All-Mountain West Conference (MW) after recording 68 tackles, 9.5 tackles-for-loss (TFLs), 3.5 sacks, three interceptions and 13 pass breakups. In his college career, he recorded six interceptions.

== Professional career ==
Pre-draft measurables
Height	Weight	Arm length	Hand span	Wingspan	40-yard dash	10-yard split	20-yard split	20-yard shuttle	Three-cone drill	Vertical jump	Broad jump	Bench press
5 ft 11 5/8 in (1.82 m)	190 lb (86 kg)	31 1/2 in (0.80 m)	8 7/8 in (0.23 m)	6 ft 3 1/4 in (1.91 m)	4.53 s	1.54 s	2.60 s	4.39 s	7.11 s	33.5 in (0.85 m)	9 ft 10 in (3.00 m)	10 reps
All values from Pro Day

After going unselected in the 2025 NFL draft, Baldwin signed with the Green Bay Packers as an undrafted free agent, receiving a contract that included $115,000 guaranteed. He was waived at the final roster cuts, on August 26, 2025, then re-signed to the practice squad two days later. On December 31, the Packers signed Baldwin to their active roster.

Baldwin was waived/injured by the Packers on August 9, 2026 and reverted to injured reserve the next day.

== NFL career statistics ==
=== Regular season ===
Year	Team	Games		Tackles				Interceptions						Fumbles			
Year	Team	GP	GS	Cmb	Solo	Ast	Sck	PD	Int	Yds	Avg	Lng	TD	FF	FR	Yds	TD
2025	GB	1	0	7	4	3	0.0	0	0	0	0	0	0	0	0	0	0
Career		1	0	7	4	3	0.0	0	0	0	0	0	0	0	0	0	0
Source: pro-football-reference.com

=== Postseason ===
Year	Team	Games		Tackles				Interceptions						Fumbles			
Year	Team	GP	GS	Cmb	Solo	Ast	Sck	PD	Int	Yds	Avg	Lng	TD	FF	FR	Yds	TD
2025	GB	1	0	0	0	0	0.0	0	0	0	0.0	0	0	0	0	0	0
Career		1	0	0	0	0	0.0	0	0	0	0.0	0	0	0	0	0	0
Source: pro-football-reference.com
