= Jamon Dumas-Johnson =

American football player (born 2001)

Profile
- Position: Linebacker

Personal information
- Born: November 28, 2001 (age 24); Hyattsville, Maryland, U.S.
- Listed height: 6 ft 1 in (1.85 m)
- Listed weight: 236 lb (107 kg)

Career information
- High school: Saint Frances Academy (Baltimore, Maryland)
- College: Georgia (2021–2023); Kentucky (2024)
- NFL draft: 2025: undrafted

Career history
- Green Bay Packers (2025); Baltimore Ravens (2026)*
- * Offseason or practice squad member only

Awards and highlights
- 2× CFP national champion (2021, 2022); First-team All-American (2022); Second-team All-SEC (2022)

Career NFL statistics as of 2025
- Total tackles: 10
- Pass deflections: 1
- Stats at Pro Football Reference

Jamon Lloyd Dumas-Johnson (born November 28, 2001) is an American professional football linebacker. He played college football for the Georgia Bulldogs and Kentucky Wildcats.

== College career ==
Dumas-Johnson attended Saint Frances Academy in Baltimore, Maryland. He committed to the University of Georgia to play college football.

As a true freshman at Georgia in 2021, Dumas-Johnson played in 14 games as a backup recording 22 tackles, two sacks and one interception he returned for a touchdown. He took over as a starter his sophomore year in 2022.

On December 14, 2023, instead of entering into the 2024 NFL draft, he instead announced that he would be entering the transfer portal. On December 20, Dumas-Johnson committed to playing at the University of Kentucky.

== Professional career ==
Pre-draft measurables
Height	Weight	Arm length	Hand span	Wingspan
6 ft 0 3/4 in (1.85 m)	238 lb (108 kg)	32 in (0.81 m)	9 1/2 in (0.24 m)	6 ft 6 1/2 in (1.99 m)
All values from NFL Combine

=== Green Bay Packers ===
Dumas-Johnson was signed by the Green Bay Packers as an undrafted free agent on May 2, 2025. On August 26, Dumas-Johnson was released by the Packers as part of final roster cuts and re-signed to the practice squad. He was elevated to the active roster for Week 13. Dumas-Johnson signed a reserve/future contract with Green Bay on January 12, 2026.

On April 17, 2026, Johnson was released by the Packers.

=== Baltimore Ravens ===
On August 7, 2026, Johnson signed with the Baltimore Ravens. On August 30, he was waived by Baltimore as part of final roster cuts. On September 12, Johnson was re-signed to the team's practice squad. On October 1, he was released.

== NFL career statistics ==
=== Regular season ===
Year	Team	Games		Tackles						Interceptions						Fumbles	
Year	Team	GP	GS	Cmb	Solo	Ast	Sck	TFL	Sfty	PD	Int	Yds	Avg	Lng	TD	FF	FR
2025	GB	2	1	10	3	7	0.0	0	0	1	0	0	0.0	0	0	0	0
Career		2	1	10	3	7	0.0	0	0	1	0	0	0.0	0	0	0	0
Source: pro-football-reference.com
