= Ty'Ron Hopper =

American football linebacker (born 2001)

No. 59 – Green Bay Packers
- Position: Linebacker
- Roster status: Active

Personal information
- Born: April 26, 2001 (age 25); Shelby, North Carolina, U.S.
- Listed height: 6 ft 2 in (1.88 m)
- Listed weight: 228 lb (103 kg)

Career information
- High school: Roswell (Roswell, Georgia)
- College: Florida (2019–2021); Missouri (2022–2023)
- NFL draft: 2024: 3rd round, 91st overall pick

Career history
- Green Bay Packers (2024–present)

Awards and highlights
- 2× Second-team All-SEC (2022, 2023)

Career NFL statistics as of Week 10, 2026
- Total tackles: 67
- Sacks: 1
- Forced fumbles: 1
- Pass deflections: 6
- Interceptions: 2
- Stats at Pro Football Reference

Ty'Ron Hopper (born April 26, 2001) is an American professional football linebacker for the Green Bay Packers of the National Football League (NFL). He played college football for the Florida Gators and Missouri Tigers and was selected by the Packers in the third round of the 2024 NFL draft.

== Early life ==
Hopper attended Roswell High School in Roswell, Georgia during his senior year. He transferred from Shelby, North Carolina. In Hopper's high school career, he racked up 193 tackles with 18.5 going for a loss, seven sacks, four pass deflections, seven interceptions, two fumble recoveries, four forced fumbles and a blocked extra point. Hopper committed to play college football at the University of Florida over other schools such as Miami, North Carolina, Ole Miss, Minnesota and Tennessee.

== College career ==
=== Florida ===
As a freshman in 2019, Hopper notched two tackles with 0.5 tackles going for loss. As a sophomore, he recorded 13 tackles with one going for a loss, and half a sack. In the Gators season finale of the 2021 season, Hopper had nine tackles and a forced fumble as he helped the Gators beat Florida State and become bowl eligible. He finished the season with 62 tackles with eight going for a loss, 2.5 sacks, two pass deflections and a forced fumble. After the conclusion of the 2021 season, Hopper entered the transfer portal.

=== Missouri ===
Hopper transferred to Missouri to continue his college career. Hopper started the 2022 season off to a hot start, as in week one he racked up six tackles, a sack, and his first career interception, as he helped the Tigers beat Louisiana Tech. In week five, Hopper notched seven tackles and a forced fumble in a 26–22 loss to #1 Georgia. Hopper finished the 2022 season with 77 tackles with 13.5 being for a loss, 2.5 sacks, four pass deflections, an interception, and a forced fumble. For his performance, Hopper was named second team All-SEC by the Associated Press. Hopper was named preseason second-team all-SEC ahead of the 2023 season. Hopper was also named a preseason third-team All-American by Athlon Sports. Hopper was also named to the Butkus Award watch list, which is awarded to the nation's best linebacker.

== Professional career ==
Pre-draft measurables
Height	Weight	Arm length	Hand span	Wingspan	40-yard dash	10-yard split	20-yard split	20-yard shuttle	Three-cone drill	Vertical jump	Broad jump
6 ft 1 3/4 in (1.87 m)	231 lb (105 kg)	31 3/8 in (0.80 m)	8 7/8 in (0.23 m)	6 ft 5 3/4 in (1.97 m)	4.68 s	1.64 s	2.68 s	4.46 s	7.29 s	36.0 in (0.91 m)	10 ft 4 in (3.15 m)
All values from NFL Combine/Pro Day

The Green Bay Packers selected Hopper with 91st overall pick in the 2024 NFL draft, after having previously acquired it in a trade with the Buffalo Bills. On May 14, he signed his contract with the Packers.

== NFL career statistics ==
Legend
**Bold**	Career high

=== Regular season ===
Year	Team	Games		Tackles						Interceptions						Fumbles	
Year	Team	GP	GS	Cmb	Solo	Ast	Sck	TFL	Sfty	PD	Int	Yds	Avg	Lng	TD	FF	FR
2024	GB	17	0	9	5	4	0.0	0	0	0	0	0	0.0	0	0	0	0
2025	GB	17	2	**24**	**10**	**14**	0.0	**1**	0	0	0	0	0.0	0	0	**1**	0
Career		34	2	33	15	18	0.0	1	0	0	0	0	0.0	0	0	1	0
Source: pro-football-reference.com

=== Postseason ===
Year	Team	Games		Tackles					Interceptions						Fumbles	
Year	Team	GP	GS	Cmb	Solo	Ast	Sck	TFL	PD	Int	Yds	Avg	Lng	TD	FF	FR
2024	GB	1	0	1	0	**1**	0.0	0	0	0	0	0.0	0	0	0	0
2025	GB	1	0	**2**	**1**	**1**	0.0	0	**1**	**1**	**7**	**7.0**	**7**	0	0	0
Career		2	0	3	1	2	0.0	0	1	1	7	7.0	7	0	0	0
Source: pro-football-reference.com
