= Isaiah McDuffie =

American football player (born 1999)

No. 58 – Green Bay Packers
- Position: Linebacker
- Roster status: Active

Personal information
- Born: July 21, 1999 (age 27); Buffalo, New York, U.S.
- Listed height: 6 ft 1 in (1.85 m)
- Listed weight: 227 lb (103 kg)

Career information
- High school: Bennett (Buffalo)
- College: Boston College (2017–2020)
- NFL draft: 2021: 6th round, 220th overall pick

Career history
- Green Bay Packers (2021–present)

Career NFL statistics as of Week 10, 2026
- Total tackles: 382
- Sacks: 3
- Forced fumbles: 3
- Fumble recoveries: 3
- Pass deflections: 5
- Interceptions: 1
- Stats at Pro Football Reference

Stevenson Isaiah McDuffie (born July 21, 1999) is an American professional football linebacker for the Green Bay Packers of the National Football League (NFL). He played college football for the Boston College Eagles.

== Early life ==
McDuffie attended Frederick Law Olmsted High School PS156 (who did not have a football team) and played his high school football for the Bennett Tigers in Buffalo, NY, accumulating honors in his career as a running back and linebacker, including the Connolly Cup in 2016 which is awarded to the Best High School Player in Western New York.

== College career ==
In July 2015, he committed to play college football for Syracuse; in May 2016, he de-committed from Syracuse and committed to Boston College.

He played college football at Boston College from 2017 to 2020. In 2020, he was selected Second-team All-Atlantic Coast Conference.

== Professional career ==
Pre-draft measurables
Height	Weight	Arm length	Hand span	Wingspan	40-yard dash	10-yard split	20-yard split	20-yard shuttle	Three-cone drill	Vertical jump	Broad jump	Bench press
6 ft 1 1/4 in (1.86 m)	227 lb (103 kg)	30 1/4 in (0.77 m)	9 5/8 in (0.24 m)	6 ft 1 1/8 in (1.86 m)	4.61 s	1.62 s	2.63 s	4.39 s	7.26 s	32.5 in (0.83 m)	10 ft 1 in (3.07 m)	25 reps
All values from Pro Day

McDuffie was selected 220th overall by the Green Bay Packers in the 2021 NFL draft. He signed his rookie contract on May 14, 2021.

McDuffie was named the fourth linebacker on the depth chart to begin the 2022 season, behind De'Vondre Campbell, Quay Walker, and Krys Barnes. He saw the first significant action of his career on October 30, 2022, during a Week 8 loss to the Buffalo Bills, with Barnes on injured reserve and both Walker and Campbell exiting the game early due to an ejection and a knee injury, respectively. McDuffie became the primary defensive playcaller on the defense, playing alongside the recently signed Eric Wilson. He started the Packers' Week 9 game against the Detroit Lions alongside Walker, despite Barnes being healthy, and with Campbell still sidelined, making 5 tackles and finishing the game with a Pro Football Focus grade of 91.1.

He started all 17 games for the Packers in 2024. He ranked 2nd in the team for tackles. Following this season he was re-signed by the Packers on March 3, 2025.

On July 13, 2026, McDuffie signed a one-year contract extension with the Packers to keep him with the team through the 2027 season.

== NFL career statistics ==
Legend
**Bold**	Career high

=== Regular season ===
Year	Team	Games		Tackles					Interceptions						Fumbles	
Year	Team	GP	GS	Cmb	Solo	Ast	Sck	TFL	PD	Int	Yds	Avg	Lng	TD	FF	FR
2021	GB	13	0	2	0	2	0.0	0	0	0	0	0.0	0	0	0	0
2022	GB	17	1	43	27	16	0.0	0	0	0	0	0.0	0	0	0	**1**
2023	GB	16	8	86	**56**	30	0.5	**5**	1	0	0	0.0	0	0	0	0
2024	GB	17	17	**97**	46	**51**	0.5	3	**3**	0	0	0.0	0	0	**1**	0
2025	GB	17	12	92	47	45	**1.0**	3	1	**1**	0	0.0	0	0	0	0
Total		80	38	320	176	144	2.0	11	5	1	0	0.0	0	0	1	1
Source: pro-football-reference.com

=== Postseason ===
Year	Team	Games		Tackles					Interceptions						Fumbles	
Year	Team	GP	GS	Cmb	Solo	Ast	Sck	TFL	PD	Int	Yds	Avg	Lng	TD	FF	FR
2021	GB	1	0	1	1	0	0.0	0	0	0	0	0.0	0	0	0	0
2023	GB	2	1	6	**5**	1	0.0	0	0	0	0	0.0	0	0	0	0
2024	GB	1	1	**8**	2	**6**	**0.5**	0	0	0	0	0.0	0	0	0	0
2025	GB	1	0	6	4	2	0.0	0	**1**	0	0	0.0	0	0	0	0
Career		5	2	21	12	9	0.5	0	1	0	0	0.0	0	0	0	0
Source: pro-football-reference.com

== Personal life ==
He is first cousins with Kansas Jayhawks running back, Dylan McDuffie.
