= Jaylin Simpson =

American football player (born 2000)

No. 32 – Miami Dolphins
- Position: Cornerback
- Roster status: Active

Personal information
- Born: March 17, 2000 (age 26); Brunswick, Georgia, U.S.
- Listed height: 6 ft 0 in (1.83 m)
- Listed weight: 179 lb (81 kg)

Career information
- High school: Frederica Academy (Saint Simons Island, Georgia)
- College: Auburn (2019–2023)
- NFL draft: 2024: 5th round, 164th overall pick

Career history
- Indianapolis Colts (2024)*; New York Jets (2024); Green Bay Packers (2025); Miami Dolphins (2026–present)
- * Offseason or practice squad member only

Awards and highlights
- First-team All-SEC (2023)

Career NFL statistics as of Week 9, 2026
- Total tackles: 12
- Pass deflections: 1
- Stats at Pro Football Reference

Jaylin Simpson (born March 17, 2000) is an American professional cornerback for the Miami Dolphins of the National Football League (NFL). He played college football for the Auburn Tigers.

== Early life ==
Simpson was born in Brunswick, Georgia and attended Frederica Academy. In Simpson's high school career he played both ways, primarily as a quarterback and defensive back. On offense he completed 147 out of his 282 pass attempts for 2,349 yards and 27 touchdowns to eight interceptions. Simpson also rushed for 1,286 yards and 17 touchdowns, while hauling in 39 receptions for 526 yards and seven touchdowns. On defense he notched 138 tackles with 12 going for a loss, 13 interceptions, six forced fumbles, and four defensive touchdowns.

Coming out of high school, Simpson was rated a four star defensive back. He committed to play college football at Auburn University over offers from Alabama, Clemson, Florida State, Georgia, and LSU.

== College career ==
In Simpson's first career season in 2019, he had two tackles with half a tackle being for a loss. In the covid-shortened 2020 season, he made 14 tackles with one going for a loss, and he broke up three passes. In week nine of the 2021 season, Simpson recorded his first career interception, picking off a pass thrown by quarterback Matt Corral, as he helped Auburn beat #9 Ole Miss 31–20. He finished the 2021 season with 27 tackles with one being for a loss, three pass deflections, and an interception.

In week twelve of the 2022 season, he had a career performance where he broke up three passes and recorded an interception, as he helped the Tigers beat Western Kentucky 41–17. Simpson finished his 2022 season with 37 tackles, five pass deflections, and two interceptions. Over the 2022 offseason, Simpson switched his position from cornerback to safety.

Simpson opened the 2023 season strong as in week one, he had three tackles, a fumble recovery, and an interception which he returned 50 yards for a touchdown, as he helped Auburn dominate UMass 59–14. At the conclusion of the 2023 season he was named a member of the All-SEC first team.

== Professional career ==
Pre-draft measurables
Height	Weight	Arm length	Hand span	Wingspan	40-yard dash	10-yard split	20-yard split	20-yard shuttle	Three-cone drill	Vertical jump	Broad jump
5 ft 11 5/8 in (1.82 m)	179 lb (81 kg)	32 3/8 in (0.82 m)	9 7/8 in (0.25 m)	6 ft 4 5/8 in (1.95 m)	4.45 s	1.51 s	2.58 s	4.55 s	7.03 s	40.0 in (1.02 m)	11 ft 1 in (3.38 m)
All values from NFL Combine/Pro Day

=== Indianapolis Colts ===
The Indianapolis Colts drafted Simpson in the fifth round, with the 164th overall selection, of the 2024 NFL draft. Prior to offseason camp, the Colts announced that Simpson would shift from safety to cornerback. He was waived on August 27, and re-signed to the practice squad.

=== New York Jets ===
On December 11, 2024, Simpson was signed by the New York Jets off the Colts practice squad.

On August 2, 2025, Simpson was waived by the Jets.

=== Green Bay Packers ===
On August 18, 2025, Simpson signed with the Green Bay Packers. He was released on August 26 as part of final roster cuts and signed to the practice squad the next day. He was elevated to the active roster for Week 13. He was signed to the active roster on December 30.

On August 30, 2026, Simpson was released by the Packers as a part of final roster cuts.

=== Miami Dolphins ===
On September 1, 2026, Simpson signed with the Miami Dolphins' practice squad. On September 16, Simpson was signed to the active roster after defensive back Kyle Louis was placed on injured reserve.

== NFL career statistics ==
Legend
**Bold**	Career high

=== Regular season ===
Year	Team	Games		Tackles					Interceptions						Fumbles	
Year	Team	GP	GS	Cmb	Solo	Ast	TFL	Sck	PD	Int	Yds	Avg	Lng	TD	FF	FR
2025	GB	1	0	8	5	3	0	0.0	0	0	0	0	0	0	0	0
Career		1	0	8	5	3	0	0.0	0	0	0	0	0	0	0	0
Source: pro-football-reference.com
