= Brant Banks =

American football player (born 2000)

No. 75 – New York Jets
- Position: Offensive tackle
- Roster status: Practice squad

Personal information
- Born: May 1, 2000 (age 26); Houston, Texas, U.S.
- Listed height: 6 ft 7 in (2.01 m)
- Listed weight: 306 lb (139 kg)

Career information
- High school: Westbury Christian (Houston, Texas)
- College: Nebraska (2019–2022); Rice (2023–2024)
- NFL draft: 2025: undrafted

Career history
- Green Bay Packers (2025); Tennessee Titans (2025); Green Bay Packers (2025–2026)*; New York Jets (2026–present)
- * Offseason or practice squad member only

Career NFL statistics as of 2025
- Games played: 2
- Games started: 0
- Stats at Pro Football Reference

Brant Banks (born May 1, 2000) is an American professional football offensive tackle for the New York Jets of the National Football League (NFL). He played college football for the Nebraska Cornhuskers and Rice Owls.

== Early life ==
Banks is from Houston, Texas. He grew up competing in multiple sports including football and basketball; he also received a black belt in taekwondo at age five. He attended Westbury Christian School where he played football and basketball, earning all-district honors in football as both an offensive tackle and defensive tackle. He had planned to be a basketball player until he started receiving offers to play college football. A three-star recruit, he committed to play for the Nebraska Cornhuskers as an offensive lineman.

== College career ==
Banks redshirted at Nebraska in 2019 and appeared in one game. After the football season, he joined the Nebraska basketball team for the 2020 Big Ten Conference Tournament, appearing in one game. With the football team, he played in four games in 2020 and then in nine in 2021, making one start in the latter season. Banks played in all 12 games during the 2022 season. He transferred to the Rice Owls for the 2023 season. He started all 13 games at left guard in 2023, receiving fourth-team All-American Athletic Conference (AAC) honors from Phil Steele, then started all 12 games at right tackle in 2024.

== Professional career ==
Pre-draft measurables
Height	Weight	Arm length	Hand span	Wingspan	20-yard shuttle	Vertical jump	Broad jump	Bench press
6 ft 7 1/8 in (2.01 m)	306 lb (139 kg)	33 5/8 in (0.85 m)	9 3/8 in (0.24 m)	6 ft 10 1/4 in (2.09 m)	4.95 s	27.5 in (0.70 m)	9 ft 0 in (2.74 m)	23 reps
All values from Pro Day

=== Green Bay Packers (first stint) ===
After going unselected in the 2025 NFL draft, Banks signed with the Green Bay Packers as an undrafted free agent. He was waived by the Packers on August 26, 2025, then re-signed to the practice squad the next day. Banks was elevated to the active roster for the team's Week 2 game against the Washington Commanders. He was signed to the team's active roster on September 23 and released one week later.

=== Tennessee Titans ===
On October 1, 2025, Banks was claimed off waivers by the Tennessee Titans. He was waived on October 9.

=== Green Bay Packers (second stint) ===
On October 11, 2025, Banks signed with the Green Bay Packers' practice squad. He signed a reserve/future contract with Green Bay on January 12, 2026. On August 30, Banks was released by the Packers as a part of final roster cuts.

=== New York Jets ===
On September 3, 2026, the New York Jets signed Banks to their practice squad.
