= Anthony Campbell (American football) =

Defensive tackle for the Green Bay Packers (born 2000)

No. 93 – Green Bay Packers
- Position: Defensive tackle
- Roster status: Active

Personal information
- Born: September 9, 2000 (age 26); Kingston, Jamaica
- Listed height: 6 ft 6 in (1.98 m)
- Listed weight: 307 lb (139 kg)

Career information
- High school: Bartow (Bartow, Florida)
- College: Independence (2019–2021); Louisiana–Monroe (2021–2022); Miami (2023–2024)
- NFL draft: 2025: undrafted

Career history
- Seattle Seahawks (2025)*; Green Bay Packers (2025–present)
- * Offseason or practice squad member only

Career NFL statistics as of Week 10, 2026
- Total tackles: 10
- Sacks: 1
- Forced fumbles: 1
- Pass deflections: 1

Anthony Campbell (born September 9, 2000) is a Jamaican-American professional football defensive tackle for the Green Bay Packers of the National Football League (NFL). He played college football for the Independence Pirates, Louisiana–Monroe Warhawks and Miami Hurricanes. He has also been a member of the Seattle Seahawks.

== Early life ==
Campbell was born on September 9, 2000, in Kingston, Jamaica. He grew up competing in several sports, including soccer, rugby, track, and cricket, before moving to the U.S. around age 14. In the U.S., he settled in Bartow, Florida, where he attended Bartow High School. Campbell initially played soccer as a goalkeeper at Bartow before someone suggested he try out football. At first a placekicker, he then changed to defensive end. Campbell was named third-team All-Polk County in 2018. After high school, Campbell enrolled at Independence Community College in Kansas.

== College career ==
Campbell played in four games for the Independence Pirates during his freshman year in 2019 and then recorded six tackles in four games in the spring 2021 season. He then transferred to play for the Louisiana–Monroe Warhawks. In the fall 2021 season, Campbell appeared in six games as a backup defensive end. In his second year there, he posted 13 tackles and 3.5 tackles-for-loss (TFLs). He then transferred to the Miami Hurricanes in 2023. However, he saw very limited playing time with the Hurricanes, only appearing in one game in 2023 and eight in 2024. He was used on 56 snaps and had just one tackle at Miami.

== Professional career ==
=== Seattle Seahawks ===
Despite little action in his last years of college, Campbell was signed by the Seattle Seahawks on May 29, 2025, as an undrafted free agent, after he had tried out for two other teams. He was waived on August 26, 2025, at the final roster cuts, re-signed to the practice squad the next day, and then released from the practice squad on August 28. He returned to the practice squad on September 2, but was then released again the following day.

=== Green Bay Packers ===
Campbell was signed to the practice squad of the Green Bay Packers on January 7, 2026, prior to the team's last game. On January 12, after the season, he signed a reserve/future contract with the Packers. Although viewed as a longshot to make the team, Campbell was a standout in training camp and preseason in 2026. He recorded four tackles and two sacks during preseason and made the team's final roster for the 2026 season as a defensive tackle.
