= John FitzPatrick (American football) =

American football player (born 2000)

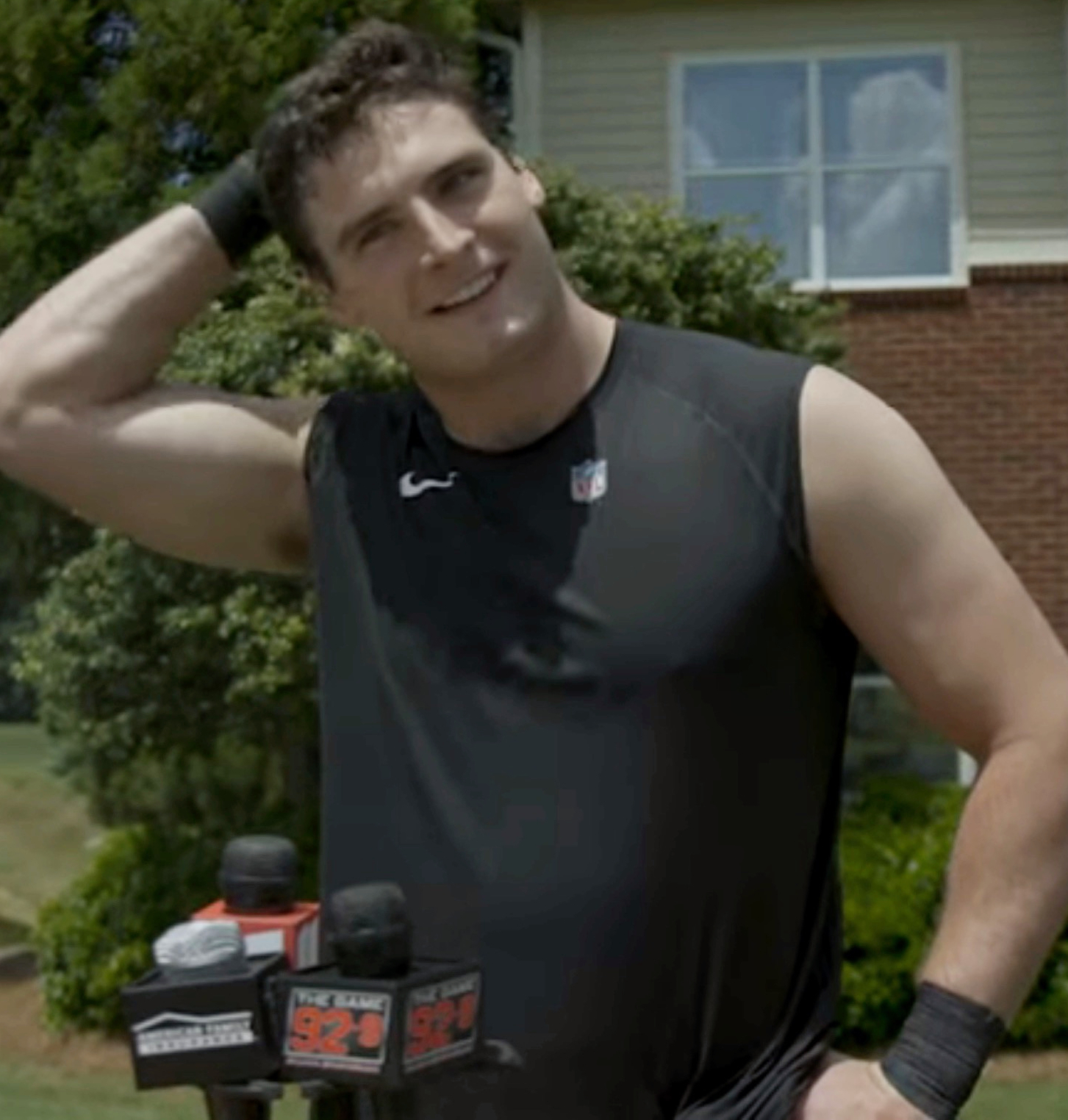

Kansas City Chiefs
- Position: Tight end
- Roster status: Practice squad

Personal information
- Born: March 9, 2000 (age 26); Atlanta, Georgia, U.S.
- Listed height: 6 ft 7 in (2.01 m)
- Listed weight: 262 lb (119 kg)

Career information
- High school: Marist (Brookhaven, Georgia)
- College: Georgia (2018–2021)
- NFL draft: 2022: 6th round, 213th overall pick

Career history
- Atlanta Falcons (2022–2024); Green Bay Packers (2024–2025); Cleveland Browns (2026)*; Kansas City Chiefs (2026–present)*
- * Offseason or practice squad member only

Awards and highlights
- CFP national champion (2021)

Career NFL statistics as of 2025
- Receptions: 14
- Receiving yards: 86
- Receiving touchdowns: 1
- Stats at Pro Football Reference

John William FitzPatrick (born March 9, 2000) is an American professional football tight end for the Kansas City Chiefs of the National Football League (NFL). He played college football for the Georgia Bulldogs.

== Early life ==
FitzPatrick grew up in Atlanta, Georgia and attended Marist High School. He was rated a three-star recruit and committed to play college football at Georgia over offers from Alabama, UCLA, and Virginia.

== College career ==
FitzPatrick redshirted his true freshman season. As a redshirt sophomore, he caught ten passes for 95 yards and one touchdown. FitzPatrick played in all 15 of Georgia's games with seven starts in his redshirt junior season, catching six passes for 83 yards as the Bulldogs won the 2022 College Football Playoff National Championship. He had played the majority of the season with fractures in both of his feet. After the end of the season, FitzPatrick declared that he would be entering the 2022 NFL draft.

== Professional career ==
Pre-draft measurables
Height	Weight	Arm length	Hand span
6 ft 7 1/8 in (2.01 m)	262 lb (119 kg)	33 3/4 in (0.86 m)	10 1/4 in (0.26 m)
All values from Pro Day

=== Atlanta Falcons ===
FitzPatrick was selected with the 213th overall pick in the sixth round of the 2022 NFL draft by the Atlanta Falcons. He was placed on injured reserve on September 1, 2022.

During the 2023 season, FitzPatrick made the Falcons' 53-man roster as the fourth tight end behind Kyle Pitts, Jonnu Smith, and MyCole Pruitt and played in nine games with one reception for 12 yards and 3 special teams tackles.

FitzPatrick was waived by the Falcons on August 27, 2024, and re-signed to the practice squad.

=== Green Bay Packers ===
On October 11, 2024, FitzPatrick was signed by the Green Bay Packers to their active roster off of the Falcons' practice squad.

On April 14, 2025, FitzPatrick re-signed with the Packers. He made 15 appearances (four starts) for Green Bay, recording 12 receptions for 72 yards and a touchdown. FitzPatrick was placed on injured reserve on December 22, due to a torn Achilles tendon suffered in Week 16 against the Chicago Bears.

=== Cleveland Browns ===
On September 29, 2026, FitzPatrick signed with the Cleveland Browns practice squad. On November 10, he was released.

=== Kansas City Chiefs ===
On November 17, 2026, FitzPatrick signed with the Kansas City Chiefs practice squad.

== NFL career statistics ==
=== Regular season ===
Year	Team	Games		Receiving					Fumbles	
Year	Team	GP	GS	Rec	Yds	Y/R	Lng	TD	Fum	Lost
2023	ATL	9	0	1	12	12.0	12	0	0	0
2024	GB	9	0	1	2	2.0	2	0	0	0
2025	GB	13	3	9	54	6.0	11	1	0	0
Career		31	3	11	68	6.2	12	1	0	0
Source: pro-football-reference.com

=== Postseason ===
Year	Team	Games		Receiving					Fumbles	
Year	Team	GP	GS	Rec	Yds	Y/R	Lng	TD	Fum	Lost
2024	GB	1	0	0	0	0.0	0	0	0	0
Career		1	0	0	0	0.0	0	0	0	0
Source: pro-football-reference.com
