= Nazir Stackhouse =

American football player (born 2002)

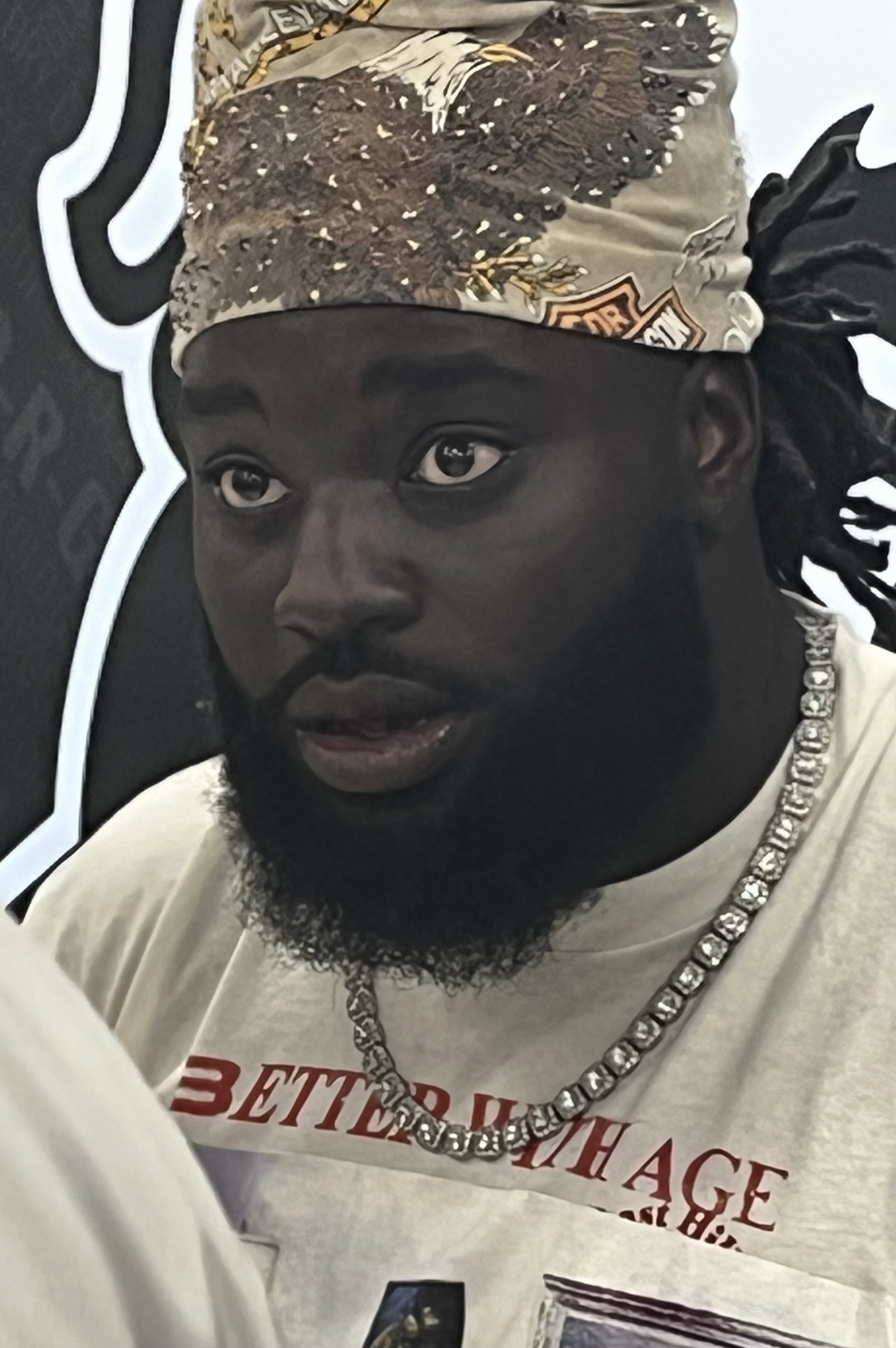
- Stackhouse in 2025

No. 93 – Tennessee Titans
- Position: Nose tackle
- Roster status: Active

Personal information
- Born: April 18, 2002 (age 24); Trenton, New Jersey, U.S.
- Listed height: 6 ft 4 in (1.93 m)
- Listed weight: 327 lb (148 kg)

Career information
- High school: Columbia (Decatur, Georgia)
- College: Georgia (2020–2024)
- NFL draft: 2025: undrafted

Career history
- Green Bay Packers (2025); Tennessee Titans (2026–present)

Awards and highlights
- 2× CFP national champion (2021, 2022); 2× Second-team All-SEC (2022, 2023)

Career NFL statistics as of 2025
- Total tackles: 12
- Stats at Pro Football Reference

Nazir Stackhouse (born April 18, 2002) is an American professional football nose tackle for the Tennessee Titans of the National Football League (NFL). He played college football for the Georgia Bulldogs.

== Early life ==
Stackhouse was born on April 18, 2002, in Trenton, New Jersey and moved to the Atlanta area when he was six. Stackhouse attended Columbia High School. Stackhouse was rated a four-star recruit and committed to play college football at Georgia as a sophomore.

== College career ==
Stackhouse joined the Georgia Bulldogs as an early enrollee and played in six games during his freshman season. He played in ten games as a reserve defensive lineman during Georgia's national championship season in 2021 and finished the year with nine tackles, two tackles for loss, and one sack. Stackhouse entered his junior season as a starter at defensive tackle. He was named second-team All-Southeastern Conference at the end of the regular season.

== Professional career ==
Pre-draft measurables
Height	Weight	Arm length	Hand span	Wingspan	40-yard dash	10-yard split	20-yard split	20-yard shuttle	Three-cone drill	Vertical jump	Broad jump	Bench press
6 ft 3 3/4 in (1.92 m)	327 lb (148 kg)	32 1/2 in (0.83 m)	10 1/4 in (0.26 m)	6 ft 6 1/8 in (1.98 m)	5.15 s	1.80 s	3.01 s	4.85 s	7.65 s	27.5 in (0.70 m)	8 ft 9 in (2.67 m)	27 reps
All values from NFL Combine/Pro Day

=== Green Bay Packers ===
On May 2, 2025, Stackhouse signed with the Green Bay Packers after going undrafted in the 2025 NFL draft.

On August 30, 2026, Stackhouse was released by the Packers as a part of final roster cuts.

=== Tennessee Titans ===
On August 31, 2026, Stackhouse was claimed off of waivers by the Tennessee Titans.

== Career statistics ==
=== NFL ===
Legend
**Bold**	Career high

==== Regular season ====
Year	Team	Games		Tackles					Fumbles		
Year	Team	GP	GS	Total	Solo	Ast	Sck	TFL	FF	FR	PD
2025	GB	13	1	12	2	10	0.0	0	0	0	0
Career		13	1	12	2	10	0.0	0	0	0	0
Source: pro-football-reference.com

==== Postseason ====
Year	Team	Games		Tackles					Fumbles		
Year	Team	GP	GS	Total	Solo	Ast	Sck	TFL	FF	FR	PD
2025	GB	1	0	0	0	0	0.0	0	0	0	0
Career		1	0	0	0	0	0.0	0	0	0	0
Source: pro-football-reference.com
