= Warren Brinson =

American football defensive tackle (born 2002)

No. 91 – Green Bay Packers
- Position: Defensive tackle
- Roster status: Injured reserve

Personal information
- Born: February 4, 2002 (age 24); Savannah, Georgia, U.S.
- Listed height: 6 ft 5 in (1.96 m)
- Listed weight: 315 lb (143 kg)

Career information
- High school: IMG Academy (Bradenton, Florida)
- College: Georgia (2020–2024)
- NFL draft: 2025: 6th round, 198th overall pick

Career history
- Green Bay Packers (2025–present)

Awards and highlights
- 2× CFP national champion (2021, 2022)

Career NFL statistics as of 2026
- Total tackles: 13
- Sacks: 0.5
- Stats at Pro Football Reference

Warren Marquis Brinson (born February 4, 2002) is an American professional football defensive tackle for the Green Bay Packers of the National Football League (NFL). He played college football for the Georgia Bulldogs and was selected by the Packers in the sixth round of the 2025 NFL draft.

== Early life ==
Brinson spent his first two years at Savannah Christian Preparatory School before transferring to IMG Academy. He was rated as a four-star recruit and committed to play college football for the Georgia Bulldogs over Florida.

== College career ==
In 2020, Brinson made three tackles in seven games. In 2021, he totaled nine tackles and a sack in 12 games. In 2022, Brinson recorded 12 tackles, 14 pressures, and a sack, as he helped the Bulldogs win their second National Championship. In 2023, he played in 13 games with four starts, where he totaled 21 tackles with three being for a loss, two sacks, and a pass deflection. In 2024, Brinson put up 26 tackles with six being for a loss, and two sacks. After the season, he declared for the 2025 NFL draft. Brinson also accepted an invite to participate in the 2025 NFL scouting combine.

== Professional career ==
Pre-draft measurables
Height	Weight	Arm length	Hand span	Wingspan	40-yard dash	10-yard split	20-yard split	20-yard shuttle	Vertical jump	Broad jump	Bench press
6 ft 5 1/4 in (1.96 m)	315 lb (143 kg)	33 1/2 in (0.85 m)	10 3/8 in (0.26 m)	6 ft 8 7/8 in (2.05 m)	5.09 s	1.76 s	2.93 s	4.64 s	31.0 in (0.79 m)	9 ft 7 in (2.92 m)	27 reps
All values from NFL Combine/Pro Day

Brinson was drafted by the Green Bay Packers with the 198th overall pick in the sixth round of the 2025 NFL draft. On May 2, 2025, he signed his rookie contract with the Packers. He was placed on injured reserve on October 3, 2026.

== Career statistics ==
=== Regular season ===
Year	Team	Games		Tackles					Fumbles		
Year	Team	GP	GS	Total	Solo	Ast	Sck	TFL	FF	FR	PD
2025	GB	11	1	13	6	7	0.5	0	0	0	0
Career		11	1	13	6	7	0.5	0	0	0	0
Source: pro-football-reference.com

=== Postseason ===
Year	Team	Games		Tackles					Fumbles		
Year	Team	GP	GS	Total	Solo	Ast	Sck	TFL	FF	FR	PD
2025	GB	1	0	1	1	0	0.0	0	0	0	0
Career		1	0	1	1	0	0.0	0	0	0	0
Source: pro-football-reference.com
