= Lecitus Smith =

American football player (born 1998)

Profile
- Position: Center

Personal information
- Born: July 13, 1998 (age 28); Miami, Florida, U.S.
- Listed height: 6 ft 3 in (1.91 m)
- Listed weight: 320 lb (145 kg)

Career information
- High school: Fitzgerald (Fitzgerald, Georgia)
- College: Virginia Tech (2017–2021)
- NFL draft: 2022: 6th round, 215th overall pick

Career history
- Arizona Cardinals (2022); Houston Texans (2023)*; Philadelphia Eagles (2023)*; Green Bay Packers (2024)*; New England Patriots (2024); Pittsburgh Steelers (2025)*; Green Bay Packers (2025); Denver Broncos (2026)*
- * Offseason or practice squad member only

Career NFL statistics as of 2025
- Games played: 19
- Games started: 4
- Stats at Pro Football Reference

Lecitus Smith (born July 13, 1998) is an American professional football center. He played college football for the Virginia Tech Hokies and was selected by the Arizona Cardinals in the sixth round of the 2022 NFL draft. Smith has also played for the New England Patriots and Green Bay Packers.

== College career ==
Smith played college football at Virginia Tech. He redshirted his freshman year in 2017. In 2018, he played in 11 games with 4 starts. In 2019, Smith started 12 games as left guard and was voted 2019 All-Atlantic Coast Conference (ACC) Honorable Mention. In 2020, Smith started all 11 games as left guard and was again voted to All-ACC Honorable Mention. In 2021, Smith returned for his fifth year.

== Professional career ==
Pre-draft measurables
Height	Weight	Arm length	Hand span	Wingspan	40-yard dash	10-yard split	20-yard split	20-yard shuttle	Three-cone drill	Vertical jump	Broad jump	Bench press
6 ft 3 1/4 in (1.91 m)	314 lb (142 kg)	31 7/8 in (0.81 m)	9 5/8 in (0.24 m)	6 ft 6 3/4 in (2.00 m)	5.18 s	1.79 s	2.99 s	4.78 s	7.88 s	25.5 in (0.65 m)	8 ft 3 in (2.51 m)	25 reps
All values from NFL Combine/Pro Day

=== Arizona Cardinals ===
Smith was selected by the Arizona Cardinals in the sixth round (215th overall) of the 2022 NFL draft.

On August 29, 2023, Smith was released by the Cardinals as part of final roster cuts before the start of the 2023 season.

=== Houston Texans ===
On November 1, 2023, Smith was signed to the practice squad of the Houston Texans, but was released six days later.

=== Philadelphia Eagles ===
On November 14, 2023, Smith was signed to the Philadelphia Eagles' practice squad. He signed a reserve/future contract with Philadelphia on January 18, 2024. Smith was waived by the Eagles on April 30.

=== Green Bay Packers ===
Smith signed with the Green Bay Packers on May 6, 2024. He was released on August 27, and re-signed to the practice squad.

=== New England Patriots ===
On October 15, 2024, Smith was signed off the Packers practice squad to the New England Patriots' active roster.

On March 21, 2025, Smith was released by the Patriots.

=== Pittsburgh Steelers ===
On March 24, 2025, Smith was claimed off of waivers by the Pittsburgh Steelers. He was waived by the Steelers on May 20.

=== Green Bay Packers (second stint) ===
Smith signed with the Green Bay Packers on August 5, 2025. He was released on August 26 as part of final roster cuts. On September 25, Smith was re-signed to the team's practice squad. Two days later, he was elevated to the active roster for the team's Week 4 matchup against the Dallas Cowboys. Smith was released by Green Bay on November 4. However, on November 12, Smith was once again re-signed to Green Bay's practice squad. He was promoted to the active roster on January 3, 2026.

=== Denver Broncos ===
On August 13, 2026, Smith signed with the Denver Broncos following an injury to Michael Deiter. On August 30, he was released by the Broncos as a part of final roster cuts.
