= Garnett Hollis =

American football player (born 2002)

Garnett Hollis Jr.
Profile
- Position: Cornerback

Personal information
- Born: June 22, 2002 (age 24); Franklin, Tennessee, U.S.
- Listed height: 6 ft 0 in (1.83 m)
- Listed weight: 199 lb (90 kg)

Career information
- High school: Battle Ground Academy
- College: Northwestern (2020–2023); West Virginia (2024)
- NFL draft: 2025: undrafted

Career history
- Tennessee Titans (2025)*; Green Bay Packers (2025)*; Buffalo Bills (2025)*; Saskatchewan Roughriders (2026)*
- * Offseason or practice squad member only

Garnett Hollis Jr. (born June 22, 2002) is an American professional football cornerback. He played college football for the Northwestern Wildcats and West Virginia Mountaineers.

== Early life ==
Hollis initially favored basketball growing up, and was named the Sumner County Boys Middle School Basketball Player of the Year after averaging 11 points, six rebounds and three assists per game in the eighth grade. Coming out of high school, he committed to playing college football for the Northwestern Wildcats over Vanderbilt.

== College career ==
=== Northwestern ===
In his first two collegiate seasons in 2020 and 2021, Hollis combined to play in five games for Northwestern. In week 2 of the 2022 season, ge got his first career start where he notched his first career interception versus Duke. In the 2022 season, Hollis played in eight games making four starts, where he notched 24 tackles, three pass deflections, an interception, and two forced fumbles. In 2023, he appeared in all 13 games for the Wildcats, where he tallied 49 tackles with three and a half being for a loss, three pass deflections, and an interception. After the season, Hollis entered his name into the NCAA transfer portal.

=== West Virginia ===
Hollis transferred to play for the West Virginia Mountaineers. He made the choice due to the success of former Mountaineers cornerback Beanie Bishop and his success the previous year, while also trying to improve his NFL draft stock. In week 9 of the 2024 season, Hollis recovered a fumble versus Arizona. After the season, he declared for the 2025 NFL draft and accepted an invite to play in the 2025 East-West Shrine Bowl.

== Professional career ==
Pre-draft measurables
Height	Weight	Arm length	Hand span	40-yard dash	10-yard split	20-yard split	20-yard shuttle	Vertical jump	Broad jump	Bench press
6 ft 0 3/8 in (1.84 m)	199 lb (90 kg)	31 in (0.79 m)	8 3/8 in (0.21 m)	4.50 s	1.58 s	2.59 s	4.30 s	36.5 in (0.93 m)	10 ft 5 in (3.18 m)	11 reps
All values from Pro Day

=== Tennessee Titans ===
On May 8, 2025, Hollis signed with the Tennessee Titans as an undrafted free agent after going unselected in the 2025 NFL draft. He was waived five days later.

=== Green Bay Packers ===
On July 26, 2025, Hollis signed with the Green Bay Packers. He was waived on August 18.

=== Buffalo Bills ===
On August 23, 2025, Hollis signed with the Buffalo Bills, but was released the next day.

=== Saskatchewan Roughriders ===
On January 5, 2026, Hollis signed with the Saskatchewan Roughriders of the Canadian Football League (CFL). He was released on May 19.
