= Waivers (NFL) =

Labor management procedure

Waivers are a National Football League (NFL) labor management procedure by which a team makes an American football player's contract or NFL rights (such as NFL draft rights to an unsigned player) available to all other teams.

== How it works ==
During the season (starting July 4 and lasting through the regular season), each team has 24 hours to file a claim for a player that another team has made available through the system or waive the right to do so. During the off season each team has three days to file such claims. Claiming teams are assigned the rights to or contracts via a priority system based on inverse order of record. Players that clear waivers, meaning they pass through the waiver period unclaimed, become free agents. Waiver claims are irrevocable.

NFL clubs are prohibited from contacting waived players until the player has been released by the club after passing waivers.

As of 2008, at the conclusion of a season in which a veteran with four years of service is claimed via waivers, veterans with a no-trade clause in their contracts may declare themselves free agents. Any other veteran with four years of service can declare himself a free agent at the conclusion of the season after the season in which they were claimed on waivers if they remain under a claimed contract.

A player who clears waivers and becomes a free agent is free to negotiate and sign a contract with any NFL club, and any NFL club is free to negotiate and sign a contract with such player. There is no penalty or restriction for signing a free agent who has cleared waivers. For example, Draft Choice Compensation between Clubs or First Refusal Rights of any kind, and signing period restrictions are not applicable.
