= List of NFL players (Wa–Wh) =

This is a list of players who have appeared in at least one regular season or postseason game in the National Football League (NFL), American Football League (AFL), or All-America Football Conference (AAFC) and have a last name that falls between "Wa" and "Wh". For the rest of the W's, see list of NFL players (Wi–X). This list is accurate through the end of the 2025 NFL season.

== Wad–Wal ==
- Michael Waddell
- Reggie Waddell
- Jaylen Waddle
- LaAdrian Waddle
- Tom Waddle
- Billy Waddy
- Jude Waddy
- Ray Waddy
- Barrington Wade
- Bill Wade
- Bob Wade
- Bobby Wade
- Charlie Wade
- Jim Wade
- John Wade
- Jonathan Wade
- Shaun Wade
- Todd Wade
- Tommy Wade
- Trevin Wade
- Colby Wadman
- Andre Wadsworth
- Henry Waechter
- John Waerig
- Carl Wafer
- Clint Wager
- John Wager
- Harmon Wages
- Barry Wagner
- Bobby Wagner
- Bryan Wagner
- Buff Wagner
- Dalton Wagner
- Lowell Wagner
- Mike Wagner
- Ray Wagner (born 1902)
- Ray Wagner (born 1957)
- Rick Wagner
- Sid Wagner
- Steve Wagner
- William Wagner
- Danny Wagoner
- Jim Wagstaff
- Mike Wahle
- Jim Wahler
- Drew Wahlroos
- Frank Wainright
- Loyd Wainscott
- Carl Waite
- Will Waite
- Van Waiters
- Corliss Waitman
- Alex Waits
- Cameron Wake
- Fred Wakefield
- Larry Walbridge
- Mark Walczak
- Stan Waldemore
- Bobby Walden
- Erik Walden
- Tim Waldron
- Rob Waldrop
- Kerwin Waldroup
- Ralph Waldsmith
- Mark Walen
- Craig Walendy
- Matt Waletzko
- Clive Walford
- Billy Walik
- Aaron Walker
- Adam Walker (born 1963)
- Adam Walker (born 1968)
- Anthony Walker Jr.
- Bill Walker
- Bracy Walker
- Brian Walker
- Bruce Walker
- Byron Walker
- Casey Walker
- Chuck Walker
- Clarence Walker
- Cleo Walker
- Corey Walker
- D'Andre Walker
- Darius Walker
- Darnell Walker
- Darwin Walker
- Delanie Walker
- DeMarcus Walker
- Denard Walker
- Deone Walker
- Derrick Walker
- Devontez Walker
- Doak Walker
- Donnie Walker
- Dwight Walker
- Elliott Walker
- Frank Walker
- Fulton Walker
- Gary Walker (born 1963)
- Gary Walker (born 1973)
- Glen Walker
- Greg Walker
- Herschel Walker
- Jackie Walker
- Jahdae Walker
- Jalon Walker
- James Walker
- Javon Walker
- Jay Walker
- Jeff Walker
- Jimmy Walker
- Joe Walker (born 1977)
- Joe Walker (born 1992)
- John Walker
- Josh Walker
- Kenneth Walker III
- Kenny Walker
- Kenyatta Walker
- Kevin Walker (born 1963)
- Kevin Walker (born 1965)
- Langston Walker
- Louie Walker
- Malcolm Walker
- Marquis Walker
- Michael Walker
- Mickey Walker
- Mike Walker (born October 18, 1949)
- Mike Walker (born November 7, 1949)
- Mykal Walker
- Paul Walker
- P.J. Walker
- Quay Walker
- Quentin Walker
- Ramon Walker
- Randy Walker
- Rasheed Walker
- Reggie Walker (born 1986)
- Reggie Walker (born 1996)
- Rick Walker
- Robert Walker
- Rod Walker
- Sammy Walker
- Tim Walker
- Tony Walker
- Tracy Walker
- Travon Walker
- Tray Walker
- Tyrunn Walker
- Val Joe Walker
- Vance Walker
- Wayne Walker (born 1936)
- Wayne Walker (born 1944)
- Wayne Walker (born 1966)
- Wesley Walker
- Willie Walker
- Eddie Wall
- Jamar Wall
- Aaron Wallace
- Aaron Wallace Jr.
- Al Wallace
- Bev Wallace
- Bob Wallace
- Caedan Wallace
- Calvin Wallace
- C. J. Wallace
- Cody Wallace
- Cooper Wallace
- Dutch Wallace
- Gordon Wallace
- Henry Wallace
- Jackie Wallace
- John Wallace
- Josh Wallace
- K'Von Wallace
- Levi Wallace
- Martin Wallace
- Mike Wallace
- Ray Wallace
- Rian Wallace
- Roberto Wallace
- Rodney Wallace
- Roger Wallace
- Seneca Wallace
- Stan Wallace
- Steve Wallace
- Taco Wallace
- Trevin Wallace
- Tylan Wallace
- Tre'Vour Wallace-Simms
- Bill Waller
- Darren Waller
- Ron Waller
- Brett Wallerstedt
- Fred Wallner
- Garret Wallow
- Craig Walls
- Darrin Walls
- Everson Walls
- Henry Walls
- Herkie Walls
- Lenny Walls
- Raymond Walls
- Wesley Walls
- Will Walls
- Laurie Walquist
- Bill Walsh
- Blair Walsh
- Chris Walsh
- Ed Wals
- Jim Walsh
- Steve Walsh
- Ward Walsh
- Bullets Walson
- Bobby Walston
- Andrew Walter
- Austin Walter
- Dave Walter
- Joe Walter
- Ken Walter
- Kevin Walter
- Michael Walter
- Tyson Walter
- Anthony Walters
- Bryan Walters
- Dale Walters
- Danny Walters
- Joey Walters
- Les Walters
- Matt Walters
- Pete Walters
- Pierre Walters
- Rod Walters
- Stan Walters
- Tom Walters
- Troy Walters
- Len Walterscheid
- Alvin Walton
- Brandon Walton
- Bruce Walton
- Chuck Walton
- Frank Walton
- J. D. Walton
- Joe Walton
- John Walton
- Larry Walton
- Leterrius Walton
- Mark Walton
- Riley Walton
- Sam Walton
- Shane Walton
- Wayne Walton
- Whip Walton
- Zack Walz

== Wan–Way ==
- Seth Wand
- Ed Wang
- George Wanless
- Prince Tega Wanogho
- Tim Wansley
- Hal Wantland
- War Eagle
- Ward
- Alex Ward
- B. J. Ward
- Bill Ward (born 1895)
- Bill Ward (born 1921)
- Cam Ward
- Carl Ward
- Channing Ward
- Charvarius Ward
- Chris Ward (born 1955)
- Chris Ward (born 1974)
- David Ward (born 1907)
- David Ward (born 1964)
- Dedric Ward
- Denzel Ward
- Derrick Ward
- Elmer Ward
- Greg Ward
- Hines Ward
- Jay Ward
- Jihad Ward
- Jim Ward
- Jimmie Ward
- John Ward
- Johnny Ward
- Jonathan Ward
- LaShaun Ward
- Paul Ward
- Phillip Ward
- Ronnie Ward
- T. J. Ward
- Terron Ward
- Tim Ward
- Duane Wardlow
- Andre Ware
- Charlie Ware
- DeMarcus Ware
- Derek Ware
- DJ Ware
- Jeremy Ware
- Jylan Ware
- Kevin Ware
- Matt Ware
- Spencer Ware
- Timmie Ware
- Eric Warfield
- Paul Warfield
- Larry Warford
- Ernie Warlick
- Chance Warmack
- Julius Warmsley
- Jim Warne
- Charley Warner
- Curt Warner
- Fred Warner
- Josh Warner
- Kurt Warner
- Ron Warner
- David Warnke
- Warren
- Buzz Warren
- Carter Warren
- Chris Warren
- Dewey Warren
- Don Warren
- Frank Warren
- Gerard Warren
- Greg Warren
- Jaylen Warren
- Jeremiah Warren
- Jimmy Warren
- John Warren
- Lamont Warren
- Michael Warren
- Morrie Warren
- Paris Warren
- Pierre Warren
- Steve Warren
- Terrence Warren
- Ty Warren
- Tyler Warren
- Vince Warren
- Xavier Warren
- Peter Warrick
- Kahale Warring
- Tex Warrington
- Nigel Warrior
- Earl Warweg
- Lonnie Warwick
- Ron Warzeka
- Adolphus Washington
- Al Washington
- Anthony Washington
- Ar'Darius Washington
- Brandon Washington
- Brian Washington
- Broderick Washington Jr.
- Carlos Washington
- Casey Washington
- Charles Washington (born 1966)
- Charles Washington (born 1993)
- Chauncey Washington
- Chris Washington
- Chuck Washington
- Clarence Washington
- Clyde Washington
- Corey Washington
- Cornelius Washington
- Damon Washington
- Darnell Washington
- Daryl Washington
- Dave Washington (born 1940)
- Dave Washington (born 1948)
- DeAndre Washington
- Dewayne Washington
- Dick Washington
- Donald Washington
- Dwayne Washington
- Eric Washington
- Fabian Washington
- Fred Washington (born 1944)
- Fred Washington (born 1967)
- Gene Washington (born 1944)
- Gene Washington (born 1947)
- Gene Washington (born 1953)
- Harry Washington
- James Washington (born 1965)
- James Washington (born 1996)
- Joe Washington (born 1951)
- Joe Washington (born 1953)
- John Washington
- Keith Washington
- Kelley Washington
- Kenny Washington
- Leon Washington
- Lionel Washington
- Malik Washington
- Marcus Washington
- Mark Washington (born 1947)
- Mark Washington (born 1985)
- Marvin Washington
- Mickey Washington
- Mike Washington
- Montrell Washington
- Nate Washington
- Parker Washington
- Patrick Washington
- Rashad Washington
- Robert Washington
- Ronnie Washington
- Russ Washington
- Sam Washington
- Scotty Washington
- Tahj Washington
- Tavares Washington
- Teddy Washington
- Ted Washington
- Ted Washington, Sr.
- Tim Washington
- Todd Washington
- Tony Washington
- Trey Washington
- Vic Washington
- Jim Waskiewicz
- Lloyd Wasserbach
- Bob Waterfield
- Andre Waters
- Anthony Waters
- Bob Waters
- Brian Waters
- Charlie Waters
- Dale Waters
- Herb Waters
- Mike Waters
- Earl Watford
- Jerry Watford
- Pete Wathen
- Bobby Watkins (born 1932)
- Bobby Watkins (born 1960)
- Carlos Watkins
- Danny Watkins
- Foster Watkins
- Gordon Watkins
- Jaylen Watkins
- Jordan Watkins
- Kendell Watkins
- Larry Watkins
- Pat Watkins
- Quez Watkins
- Rokevious Watkins
- Sammy Watkins
- Todd Watkins
- Tom Watkins
- Allan Watson
- Ben Watson
- Blake Watson
- Chris Watson
- Christian Watson
- Courtney Watson
- Dave Watson
- Dekoda Watson
- Deshaun Watson
- Ed Watson
- Eddie Watson
- Ernest Watson
- Gabe Watson
- Jaylen Watson
- Jim Watson
- Joe Watson
- John Watson
- Josh Watson
- Justin Watson (born 1975)
- Justin Watson (born 1996)
- Kenny Watson
- Leroy Watson
- Louis Watson
- Menelik Watson
- Nathaniel Watson
- Pete Watson
- Rat Watson
- Remi Watson
- Sid Watson
- Steve Watson
- Terrell Watson
- Tim Watson
- Chris Watt
- Derek Watt
- J. J. Watt
- Joe Watt
- T. J. Watt
- Walter Watt
- Frank Wattelet
- Luke Wattenberg
- Bob Watters
- Len Watters
- Orlando Watters
- Ricky Watters
- Scott Watters
- Armani Watts
- Armon Watts
- Brandon Watts
- Craig Watts
- Damon Watts
- Darius Watts
- Elbert Watts
- Eric Watts
- George Watts
- Markees Watts
- Randy Watts
- Rickey Watts
- Robert Watts
- Ted Watts
- Trey Watts
- Xavier Watts
- Marlowe Wax
- Charles Way
- Charley Way
- Tress Way
- Dave Waymer
- Jared Wayne
- Nate Wayne
- Reggie Wayne
- Trae Waynes
- Russell Wayt

== We ==
- Jester Weah
- Bob Wear
- Fred Weary (born 1974)
- Fred Weary (born 1977)
- Theo Wease Jr.
- Jim Weatherall
- Jim Weatherford
- Sterling Weatherford
- Steve Weatherford
- Colston Weatherington
- Bones Weatherly
- Jim Weatherly
- Stephen Weatherly
- Andre Weathers
- Carl Weathers
- Clarence Weathers
- Cop Weathers
- Curtis Weathers
- Robert Weathers
- Dennis Weathersby
- Cephus Weatherspoon
- Chuck Weatherspoon
- Sean Weatherspoon
- Jim Weatherwax
- Anthony Weaver
- Buck Weaver
- Charlie Weaver
- Curtis Weaver
- Emanuel Weaver
- Gary Weaver
- Herman Weaver
- Jed Weaver
- John Weaver
- Larrye Weaver
- Leonard Weaver
- Rashad Weaver
- Red Weaver
- Xavier Weaver
- Allan Webb
- Art Webb
- B. W. Webb
- Chuck Webb
- Davis Webb
- Dee Webb
- Don Webb
- George Webb
- Jeff Webb
- Jimmy Webb
- J'Marcus Webb
- Joe Webb
- Ken Webb
- Lardarius Webb
- Mark Webb
- Raleigh Webb
- Richmond Webb
- Sam Webb
- Dutch Webber
- Harry Webber
- Charlie Weber
- Chuck Weber
- Dick Weber
- Alex Webster
- Corey Webster
- Cornell Webster
- Dave Webster
- Elnardo Webster
- George Webster
- Jason Webster
- Kayvon Webster
- Ken Webster
- Kevin Webster
- Larry Webster
- Larry Webster III
- Mike Webster
- Nate Webster
- Nsimba Webster
- Tim Webster
- Floyd Wedderburn
- Mike Weddington
- Eric Weddle
- Dick Wedel
- Herman Wedemeyer
- Scott Wedige
- Tad Weed
- Brandon Weeden
- Don Weedon
- George Weeks
- Jon Weeks
- Marquis Weeks
- Darrion Weems
- Eric Weems
- Norris Weese
- Bucky Wegener
- Mike Weger
- Ted Wegert
- Brandon Wegher
- Ray Wehba
- Roger Wehrli
- Bert Weidner
- Lee Weigel
- Jack Weil
- Chuck Weimer
- Henry Weinberg
- Sol Weinberg
- Art Weiner
- Bernie Weiner
- Reds Weiner
- Todd Weiner
- Chris Weinke
- Arnie Weinmeister
- Izzy Weinstock
- Ed Weir
- Joe Weir
- Sammy Weir
- Ed Weisacosky
- Heinie Weisenbaugh
- Dick Weisgerber
- Clayton Weishuhn
- Howard Weiss
- John Weiss
- Ron Weissenhofer
- Tripp Welborne
- John Welbourn
- Claxton Welch
- Gibby Welch
- Herb Welch
- Jim Welch
- Kristian Welch
- Thomas Welch
- Treyton Welch
- Harold Weldin
- Bodie Weldon
- Casey Weldon
- Larry Weldon
- Wes Welker
- Joe Wellborn
- Bub Weller
- Rabbit Weller
- Gary Wellman
- Mike Wellman
- Arthur Wells
- Beanie Wells
- Billy Wells
- Bob Wells
- Dana Wells
- David Wells
- Dean Wells
- Don Wells
- Harold Wells
- Joel Wells
- Jonathan Wells
- Josh Wells
- Kent Wells
- Mike Wells (born 1951)
- Mike Wells (born 1962)
- Mike Wells (born 1971)
- Norm Wells
- Ray Wells
- Reggie Wells
- Scott Wells
- Terry Wells
- Warren Wells
- Doug Wellsandt
- Woodchuck Welmas
- Jim Welsh
- Jonathan Welsh
- Tom Welter
- Larry Weltman
- Don Wemple
- Marty Wendell
- Ryan Wendell
- Jack Wender
- Hal Wendler
- Joe Wendlick
- John Wendling
- Joe Wendryhoski
- Ken Wendt
- Al Wenglikowski
- Obe Wenig
- Ad Wenke
- Austin Wentworth
- Cy Wentworth
- Barney Wentz
- Carson Wentz
- Jeff Wenzel
- Ralph Wenzel (born 1918)
- Ralph Wenzel (born 1943)
- Dick Werder
- Red Werder
- Bob Werl
- Björn Werner
- Clyde Werner
- Greg Werner
- Pete Werner
- Ray Wersching
- Mule Werwaiss
- Al Wesbecher
- Trevon Wesco
- Antoine Wesley
- Bull Wesley
- Dante Wesley
- De'Ondre Wesley
- Greg Wesley
- Joe Wesley
- Ricky Wesson
- Belf West
- Bill West
- Burr West
- Charcandrick West
- Charlie West
- Chastin West
- CJ West
- Dave West
- Derek West
- Ed West
- Jeff West
- Lyle West
- Mel West
- Pat West
- Robert West
- Ronnie West
- Stan West
- Terrance West
- Troy West
- Walter West
- Willie West
- Brian Westbrook
- Bryant Westbrook
- Byron Westbrook
- Dede Westbrook
- Don Westbrook
- Michael Westbrook
- Nick Westbrook-Ikhine
- Ethan Westbrooks
- Greg Westbrooks
- Cleve Wester
- LaJohntay Wester
- Leonard Wester
- Christian Westerman
- Jamaal Westerman
- Bob Westfall
- Ed Westfall
- Dick Westmoreland
- Eric Westmoreland
- Ja'Markis Weston
- Jeff Weston
- Rhondy Weston
- Jack Westover
- Chris Westry
- Ryan Wetnight
- Bob Wetoska
- Chet Wetterlund
- Max Wettstein
- Harlan Wetz
- Buzz Wetzel
- John Wetzel
- Marty Wetzel
- Ron Wetzel
- Bill Wexler

== Wh ==
- Bill Whalen
- Griff Whalen
- James Whalen
- Jerry Whalen
- Jim Whalen
- Ryan Whalen
- Ben Whaley
- Tom Wham
- Hogan Wharton
- Tershawn Wharton
- Travelle Wharton
- Jim Whatley
- Tyrus Wheat
- Warren Wheat
- Austin Wheatley
- Terrence Wheatley
- Tyrone Wheatley
- Tyrone Wheatley Jr.
- Kenny Wheaton
- Markus Wheaton
- Chad Wheeler
- Cowboy Wheeler
- Damen Wheeler
- Dwight Wheeler
- Ernie Wheeler
- Leonard Wheeler
- Manch Wheeler
- Mark Wheeler (born 1964)
- Mark Wheeler (born 1970)
- Philip Wheeler
- Ron Wheeler
- Ted Wheeler
- Wayne Wheeler
- Ernie Wheelwright (born 1939)
- Ernie Wheelwright (born 1984)
- Daniel Whelan
- Tom Whelan
- Tommy Whelan
- Craig Whelihan
- Larry Whigham
- Guy Whimper
- Ray Whipple
- Jodie Whire
- Ken Whisenhunt
- Bill Whitaker
- Creston Whitaker
- Danta Whitaker
- Ronyell Whitaker
- Frank Whitcomb
- Adrian White
- Alberto White
- Allie White
- Andre White
- Blair White
- Bob White (born 1929)
- Bob White (born 1938)
- Bob White (born 1963)
- Brad White
- Buck White
- Bucky White
- Byron White
- Charles White
- Charlie White
- Chris White (born 1962)
- Chris White (born 1976)
- Chris White (born 1983)
- Chris White (born 1989)
- Clayton White
- Cody White (born 1988)
- Cody White (born 1998)
- Corey White
- Craig White
- Danny White
- Daryl White
- DaShaun White
- David White
- DeAndrew White
- Devin White
- Dewayne White
- Dez White
- D. J. White
- Dwayne White
- Dwight White
- Ed White
- Ellery White
- Freeman White
- Gene White (born 1919)
- Gene White (born 1932)
- Gerald White
- Harvey White
- Jamel White
- James White (born 1953)
- James White (born 1992)
- Jan White
- Javin White
- Jeff White
- Jeris White
- Jim White (born 1920)
- Jim White (born 1948)
- John White
- Johnny White
- Jordan White
- Jose White
- Keion White
- Kevin White
- Kyzir White
- Lawrence White
- Lee White
- LenDale White
- Leon White
- Lorenzo White
- Lyman White
- Mac White
- Markus White
- Marsh White
- Marvin White
- Melvin White
- Mike White (born 1957)
- Mike White (born 1995)
- Myles White
- Pat White
- Paul White (born 1921)
- Paul White (born 1948)
- Phil White
- Rachaad White
- Ralph White
- Randy White
- Ray White
- Reggie White (born 1961)
- Reggie White (born 1970)
- Reggie White (born 1979)
- Ricky White
- Robb White
- Robert White
- Roddy White
- Russell White
- Sammy White
- Sheldon White
- Sherman White
- Stan White (born 1949)
- Steve White
- Stylez White
- Tarzan White
- Tim White
- Tracy White
- Tre'Davious White
- Walter White
- Wilbur White
- Wilford White
- William White
- Zamir White
- Marvin Whited
- Mike Whited
- Cody Whitehair
- Bud Whitehead
- Jermaine Whitehead
- Jordan Whitehead
- Lucky Whitehead
- Tahir Whitehead
- Walker Whitehead
- Willie Whitehead
- Blake Whiteheart
- Charlie Whitehurst
- David Whitehurst
- Keyon Whiteside
- Nick Whiteside
- A. D. Whitfield
- Bob Whitfield
- Brandon Whiting
- Teag Whiting
- Blake Whitlatch
- Benton Whitley
- Curtis Whitley
- Hall Whitley
- James Whitley
- Taylor Whitley
- Wilson Whitley
- Nikita Whitlock
- Bob Whitlow
- Ken Whitlow
- Josh Whitman
- S. J. Whitman
- Vic Whitmarsh
- David Whitmore
- Nat Whitmyer
- Donte Whitner
- Isaac Whitney
- Dave Whitsell
- Fozzy Whittaker
- Jace Whittaker
- Alvis Whitted
- Bobby Whitten
- Todd Whitten
- Jesse Whittenton
- Will Whitticker
- Cary Whittingham
- Fred Whittingham
- Kyle Whittingham
- Arthur Whittington
- Bernard Whittington
- C. L. Whittington
- Jordan Whittington
- Mike Whittington
- Jason Whittle
- Ricky Whittle
- Mike Whitwell
- Andrew Whitworth
- Josh Whyle
- Kerrith Whyte Jr
