= List of NFL players (Wi–X) =

This is a list of players who have appeared in at least one regular season or postseason game in the National Football League (NFL), American Football League (AFL), or All-America Football Conference (AAFC) and have a last name that falls between "Wi" and "X". For the rest of the W's, see list of NFL players (Wa–Wh). This list is accurate through the end of the 2025 NFL season.

== Wi ==
- John Wiatrak
- Ossie Wiberg
- Murray Wichard
- Cody Wichmann
- Cole Wick
- Tom Wickert
- Lloyd Wickett
- Bob Wicks
- Dontayvion Wicks
- Ron Widby
- Dave Widell
- Doug Widell
- Chet Widerquist
- Bud Widick
- Corey Widmer
- Ed Widseth
- Eric Wiegand
- Zach Wiegert
- Casey Wiegmann
- Joe Wiehl
- Bob Wiese
- Ray Wietecha
- John Wiethe
- Paul Wiggin
- James Wiggins
- Jermaine Wiggins
- Kenny Wiggins
- Nate Wiggins
- Paul Wiggins
- Gene Wiggs
- Hubert Wiggs
- Bill Wightkin
- Kyle Wilber
- Ray Wilborn
- John Wilbur
- Barry Wilburn
- J. R. Wilburn
- Steve Wilburn
- Mike Wilcher
- Solomon Wilcots
- Daniel Wilcox
- Dave Wilcox
- Firpo Wilcox
- J. J. Wilcox
- John Wilcox
- Josh Wilcox
- Mitchell Wilcox
- Ned Wilcox
- George Wilde
- Bert Wilder
- Hal Wilder
- James Wilder
- Rachad Wildgoose
- Brandon Wilds
- Garnell Wilds
- Dick Wildung
- Matt Wile
- Charles Wiley
- Chuck Wiley
- Jack Wiley
- Jared Wiley
- Marcellus Wiley
- Michael Wiley
- Ernest Wilford
- Vince Wilfork
- Erik Wilhelm
- Matt Wilhelm
- Jonathan Wilhite
- Michael Wilhoite
- Elmer Wilkens
- Basil Wilkerson
- Ben Wilkerson
- Bruce Wilkerson
- Daryl Wilkerson
- Doug Wilkerson
- Eric Wilkerson
- Jimmy Wilkerson
- Kristian Wilkerson
- Muhammad Wilkerson
- Reggie Wilkes
- Willie Wilkin
- Christian Wilkins
- David Wilkins
- Dick Wilkins
- Gabe Wilkins
- Gary Wilkins
- Jeff Wilkins
- Jordan Wilkins
- Marcus Wilkins
- Mazzi Wilkins
- Roy Wilkins
- Terrence Wilkins
- Bob Wilkinson
- Dan Wilkinson
- Elijah Wilkinson
- Gerris Wilkinson
- Jerry Wilkinson
- Jim Wilks
- Erwin Will
- Jerrott Willard
- Ken Willard
- Henry Willegale
- Kenny Willekes
- Willert
- Norm Willey
- Cole Willging
- Gerald Willhite
- Kevin Willhite
- A. D. Williams
- Aaron Williams
- Aeneas Williams
- Al Williams
- Alfred Williams
- Allen Williams
- Alonzo Williams
- Andre Williams
- Andrew Williams
- Antonio Williams
- Antwione Williams
- Armon Williams
- Avery Williams
- Ben Williams (born 1954)
- Ben Williams (born 1970)
- Bernard Williams
- Bert Williams
- Billy Williams
- Bob Williams
- Bobbie Williams
- Bobby Williams
- Boo Williams
- Boyd Williams
- Brandon Williams (born 1984)
- Brandon Williams (born 1987)
- Brandon Williams (born 1988)
- Brandon Williams (born 1989)
- Brandon Williams (born 1992)
- Brent Williams
- Brett Williams
- Brian Williams (born 1957)
- Brian Williams (born 1966)
- Brian Williams (born 1972)
- Brian Williams (born 1979)
- Brock Williams
- Brooks Williams
- Byron Williams
- Cadillac Williams
- Caleb Williams
- Calvin Williams
- Cameron Williams
- Cary Williams
- Chad Williams (born 1979)
- Chad Williams (born 1994)
- Charles Williams
- Charlie Williams
- Chavis Williams
- Chris Williams (born 1959)
- Chris Williams (born 1968)
- Chris Williams (born 1985)
- Chris Williams (born 1987)
- Chris Williams (born 1998)
- Clancy Williams
- Clarence Williams (born 1946)
- Clarence Williams (born 1955)
- Clarence Williams (born 1969)
- Clarence Williams (born 1975)
- Clarence Williams (born 1977)
- Clyde Williams (born 1908)
- Clyde Williams (born 1940)
- Connor Williams
- Corey Williams
- Cy Williams
- Damarion Williams
- Damian Williams
- Damien Williams
- Dan Williams (born 1969)
- Dan Williams (born 1987)
- Darious Williams
- Darrel Williams
- Darrell Williams
- Darrell Williams Jr.
- Darrent Williams
- Darryl Williams (born 1970)
- Darryl Williams (born 1997)
- Daryl Williams
- Dave Williams (born 1945)
- Dave Williams (born 1954)
- Davern Williams
- David Williams (born 1963)
- David Williams (born 1966)
- David Williams (born 1994)
- DeAngelo Williams
- Dee Williams
- Del Williams
- Delvin Williams
- Demetrius Williams
- Demise Williams
- Demorrio Williams
- Derrick Williams
- Derwin Williams
- DeShawn Williams
- Dexter Williams
- D. J. Williams (born 1982)
- D. J. Williams (born 1988)
- D. J. Williams (born 2000)
- Doc Williams
- Dokie Williams
- Domanick Williams
- Don Williams
- Donnie Williams
- Dorian Williams
- Doug Williams (born 1955)
- Doug Williams (born 1962)
- Duke Williams (born 1990)
- Duke Williams (born 1993)
- Ed Williams (born 1961)
- Ed Williams (born 1950)
- Eddie Williams
- Edwin Williams
- Elijah Williams (born 1975)
- Elijah Williams (born 2002)
- Ellery Williams
- Eric Williams (born 1955)
- Eric Williams (born 1960)
- Eric Williams (born 1962)
- Erik Williams
- Erwin Williams
- Eugene Williams
- Evan Williams
- Frank Williams (born 1922)
- Frank Williams (born 1932)
- Frankie Williams
- Fred Williams
- Gardner Williams
- Garland Williams
- Garrett Williams
- Garry Williams
- Gary Williams
- Gene Williams
- George Williams
- Gerald Williams
- Gerard Williams
- Gerome Williams
- Gizmo Williams
- Grant Williams
- Greedy Williams
- Greg Williams
- Harry Williams
- Harvey Williams
- Henry Williams
- Herb Williams
- Howie Williams
- Ian Williams
- Ike Williams
- Inky Williams
- Isaiah Williams (born 1993)
- Isaiah Williams (born 2001)
- Jabara Williams
- Jack Williams
- Jacquian Williams
- Jake Williams
- Jamaal Williams
- Jamal Williams
- Jamar Williams
- Jamel Williams
- James Williams (born 1967)
- James Williams (born March 29, 1968)
- James Williams (born October 10, 1968)
- James Williams (born 1978)
- James Williams (born 2003)
- Jameson Williams
- Jamie Williams
- Jarren Williams
- Jarveon Williams
- Jarvis Williams
- Jason Williams
- Javarris Williams
- Javonte Williams
- Jay Williams
- Jaylin Williams
- Jeff Williams (born 1943)
- Jeff Williams (born 1955)
- Jermaine Williams
- Jerrol Williams
- Jerry Williams
- Jim Williams
- Jimmy Williams (born 1960)
- Jimmy Williams (born 1979)
- Jimmy Williams (born 1984)
- Joe Williams (born 1896)
- Joe Williams (born 1915)
- Joe Williams (born 1947)
- Joe Williams (born 1965)
- Joejuan Williams
- Joel Williams (born 1926)
- Joel Williams (born 1956)
- Joel Williams (born 1965)
- John Williams (born 1945)
- John Williams (born 1960)
- John Williams (born 1964)
- John Williams (born 1974)
- Johnny Williams
- Jon Williams
- Jonah Williams
- Jonah Williams
- Jonathan Williams
- Jordan Williams
- Josh Williams (born 1976)
- Josh Williams (born 2001)
- Joshua Williams
- Julius Williams
- K. D. Williams
- Karl Williams
- Karlos Williams
- Kasen Williams
- Ke'Shawn Williams
- Keiland Williams
- Keith Williams (born 1964)
- Keith Williams (born 1988)
- Kendall Williams
- Kerwynn Williams
- Kevin Williams (born 1958)
- Kevin Williams (born 1961)
- Kevin Williams (born 1970)
- Kevin Williams (born 1971)
- Kevin Williams (born 1975
- Kevin Williams (born 1980)
- K'Waun Williams
- Kyle Williams (born 1983)
- Kyle Williams (born 1984)
- Kyle Williams (born 1988)
- Kyle Williams (born 2002)
- Kyren Williams
- Lamanzer Williams
- LaQuan Williams
- Larry Williams
- Lawrence Williams
- Lee Williams
- Leon Williams
- Leonard Williams (born 1960)
- Leonard Williams (born 1994)
- Lester Williams
- Louis Williams
- Madieu Williams
- Malcolm Williams
- Marcus Williams (born 1977)
- Marcus Williams (born 1991)
- Marcus Williams (born 1996)
- Mario Williams
- Mark Williams
- Marquez Williams
- Marvin Williams
- Maurice Williams
- Maxie Williams
- Maxx Williams
- Melvin Williams
- Michael Williams (born 1961)
- Michael Williams (born 1970)
- Michael Williams (born 1990)
- Mike Williams (born 1953)
- Mike Williams (born 1957)
- Mike Williams (born 1959)
- Mike Williams (born 1966)
- Mike Williams (born 1980)
- Mike Williams (born 1984)
- Mike Williams (born 1987)
- Mike Williams (born 1994)
- Milton Williams
- Moe Williams
- Monk Williams
- Mykel Williams
- Newton Williams
- Nick Williams (born February 21, 1990)
- Nick Williams (born November 23, 1990)
- Nohl Williams
- Oliver Williams
- Pat Williams
- Paul Williams
- Payton Williams
- Perry Williams (born 1946)
- Perry Williams (born 1961)
- Perry Williams (born 1964)
- P. J. Williams
- Pooka Williams
- Pop Williams
- Preston Williams
- Pryor Williams
- Quincy Williams
- Quinnen Williams
- Quintin Williams
- Raequan Williams
- Ralph Williams
- Randal Williams
- Ray Williams (born 1958)
- Ray Williams (born 1965)
- Reggie Williams (born 1954)
- Reggie Williams (born 1983)
- Renaud Williams
- Rex Williams
- Richard Williams (born 1952)
- Richard Williams (born 1960)
- Ricky Williams (born 1960)
- Ricky Williams (born 1977)
- Ricky Williams (born 1978)
- Robert Williams (born September 26, 1962)
- Robert Williams (born October 2, 1962)
- Robert Williams (born 1977)
- Rodarius Williams
- Rodney Williams (born 1973)
- Rodney Williams (born 1977)
- Rodney Williams (born 1998)
- Roger Williams
- Roland Williams
- Rollie Williams
- Ronnie Williams
- Roosevelt Williams
- Roy Williams (born 1937)
- Roy Williams (born 1980)
- Roy Williams (born 1981)
- Roydell Williams
- Ryan Williams
- Sam Williams (born 1931)
- Sam Williams (born 1952)
- Sam Williams (born 1980)
- Sam Williams (born 1999)
- Sammy Williams
- Savion Williams
- Scott Williams
- Seth Williams
- Shaud Williams
- Shaun Williams
- Shawn Williams
- Sherman Williams
- Sid Williams
- Stan Williams
- Stepfret Williams
- Stephen Williams
- Steve Williams (born 1951)
- Steve Williams (born 1981)
- Steve Williams (born 1991)
- Sylvester Williams
- Tank Williams
- Ted Williams
- Teddy Williams
- Terrance Williams
- Terry Williams
- Tex Williams
- Thomas Williams
- Tim Williams
- Toby Williams
- Todd Williams
- Tom Williams
- Tony Williams
- Torri Williams
- Tourek Williams
- Tramon Williams
- Travis Williams (born 1892)
- Travis Williams (born 1946)
- Travis Williams (born 1983)
- Trayveon Williams
- Trent Williams
- Trevardo Williams
- Trevor Williams
- Trey Williams
- Trill Williams
- Ty'Son Williams
- Tyleik Williams
- Tyrell Williams
- Tyrone Williams (born 1970)
- Tyrone Williams (born 1972)
- Tyrone Williams (born 1973)
- Van Williams
- Vaughn Williams
- Vince Williams (born 1959)
- Vince Williams (born 1989)
- Wally Williams
- Walt Williams (born 1919)
- Walt Williams (born 1954)
- Walter Williams
- Wandy Williams
- Warren Williams
- Wendall Williams
- Willie Williams (born 1941)
- Willie Williams (born 1967)
- Willie Williams (born 1970)
- Windell Williams
- Xavier Williams
- Zack Williams
- Avery Williamson
- Carlton Williamson
- Chris Williamson
- Ernie Williamson
- Fred Williamson
- Greg Williamson
- J. R. Williamson
- Kendall Williamson
- Troy Williamson
- Derrick Willies
- Matt Willig
- Larry Willingham
- Bill Willis
- Brayden Willis
- Chester Willis
- Damion Willis
- Donald Willis
- Fred Willis
- Gerald Willis
- Jamal Willis
- James Willis
- Jason Willis
- Jordan Willis
- Keith Willis
- Ken Willis
- Khari Willis
- Larry Willis
- Leonard Willis
- Malik Willis
- Matt Willis
- Mitch Willis
- Patrick Willis
- Peter Tom Willis
- Ray Willis
- Jedrick Wills Jr.
- Ladell Wills
- Diddie Willson
- Joe Willson
- Luke Willson
- Ray Wilmer
- Trevor Wilmot
- Klaus Wilmsmeyer
- Jeff Wilner
- Frank Wilsbach
- Abe Wilson
- Adrian Wilson
- Al Wilson
- Albert Wilson
- Antonio Wilson
- Ben Wilson
- Bernard Wilson
- Billy Wilson (born 1911)
- Billy Wilson (born 1927)
- Bob Wilson
- Bobby Wilson
- Bobo Wilson
- Brandon Wilson
- Brenard Wilson
- Brett Wilson
- Butch Wilson
- C. J. Wilson (born 1985)
- C. J. Wilson (born 1987)
- C. J. Wilson (born 1989)
- Caleb Wilson
- Camp Wilson
- Cedrick Wilson Jr.
- Cedrick Wilson Sr.
- Charles Wilson
- Chris Wilson
- Damien Wilson
- Darrell Wilson
- Darryal Wilson
- Dave Wilson
- David Wilson (born 1970)
- David Wilson (born 1991)
- Divaad Wilson
- Don Wilson
- Donovan Wilson
- Drip Wilson
- E. J. Wilson
- Earl Wilson
- Eddie Wilson
- Emanuel Wilson
- Eric Wilson (born 1962)
- Eric Wilson (born 1994)
- Eugene Wilson
- Frank Wilson
- Garrett Wilson
- Gene Wilson
- George Wilson (born 1905)
- George Wilson (born 1914)
- George Wilson (born 1943)
- George Wilson (born 1981)
- Gibril Wilson
- Gillis Wilson
- Gordon Wilson
- Harry Wilson
- Isaiah Wilson
- J. C. Wilson
- Jack Wilson
- Jamie Wilson
- Jared Wilson
- Jarrod Wilson
- Jeff Wilson
- Jerrel Wilson
- Jerry Wilson (born 1936)
- Jerry Wilson (born 1973)
- Jim Wilson (born 1896)
- Jim Wilson (born 1942)
- Jimmy Wilson
- Joe Wilson
- Johnny Wilson (born 1915)
- Johnny Wilson (born 2001)
- Josh Wilson
- Karl Wilson
- Kion Wilson
- Kris Wilson
- Kyle Wilson (born 1987)
- Kyle Wilson (born 1995)
- Larry Wilson
- Lee Wilson
- Logan Wilson
- Mack Wilson
- Marc Wilson
- Marco Wilson
- Marcus Wilson
- Mark Wilson
- Marquess Wilson
- Martez Wilson
- Marvin Wilson
- Michael Wilson
- Mike Wilson (born 1896)
- Mike Wilson (born 1946)
- Mike Wilson (born 1947)
- Mike Wilson (born 1955)
- Mike Wilson (born 1958)
- Milt Wilson
- Milton Wilson
- Mule Wilson
- Nemiah Wilson
- Otis Wilson
- Payton Wilson
- Perce Wilson
- Quincy Wilson (born 1981)
- Quincy Wilson (born 1996)
- Ramik Wilson
- Ray Wilson
- Reinard Wilson
- Robert Wilson (born 1969)
- Robert Wilson (born 1974)
- Rod Wilson
- Roman Wilson
- Russell Wilson
- Shaun Wilson
- Sheddrick Wilson
- Stanley Wilson (born 1982)
- Stanley Wilson (born 1961)
- Steve Wilson (born 1954)
- Steve Wilson (born 1957)
- Stu Wilson
- Tavon Wilson
- Ted Wilson
- Tim Wilson
- Tommy Wilson
- Tracy Wilson
- Travis Wilson
- Troy Wilson (born 1965)
- Troy Wilson (born 1970)
- Tyree Wilson
- Wade Wilson
- Walter Wilson
- Wayne Wilson
- Wildcat Wilson
- Zach Wilson
- Jason Wiltz
- Abner Wimberly
- Byron Wimberly
- Derek Wimberly
- Marcus Wimberly
- Kamerion Wimbley
- Derrick Wimbush
- Gary Wimmer
- Javon Wims
- Jeff Winans
- Tydus Winans
- Jamie Winborn
- Jamaine Winborne
- Ernie Winburn
- James Winchester
- Bill Windauer
- Joe Windbiel
- Sammy Winder
- Dave Windham
- Jacoby Windmon
- Bob Windsor
- Robert Windsor
- Mike Windt
- Brandon Winey
- Antoine Winfield Jr. (born 1998)
- Antoine Winfield Sr. (born 1977)
- Vernon Winfield
- Juwann Winfree
- Chuck Winfrey
- Perrion Winfrey
- Stan Winfrey
- Brad Wing
- Chris Wing
- Andrew Wingard
- Elmer Wingate
- Heath Wingate
- Leonard Wingate
- Blake Wingle
- Mekhi Wingo
- Rich Wingo
- Ronnie Wingo
- Dean Wink
- Bob Winkel
- Ben Winkelman
- Bernie Winkler
- Francis Winkler
- Jim Winkler
- Joe Winkler
- Randy Winkler
- Billy Winn
- Bryant Winn
- George Winn
- Bill Winneshiek
- Chase Winovich
- Bob Winslow
- Doug Winslow
- George Winslow
- Kellen Winslow
- Kellen Winslow II
- Paul Winslow
- Ryan Winslow
- Charlie Winston
- DeMond Winston
- Dennis Winston
- Easop Winston
- Eric Winston
- Glenn Winston
- Jameis Winston
- Kelton Winston
- Kevin Winston Jr.
- Lloyd Winston
- Roy Winston
- Anthony Wint
- Bill Winter
- Blaise Winter
- Leon Winternheimer
- Brian Winters
- Chet Winters
- Dee Winters
- Frank Winters
- Sonny Winters
- Wimpy Winther
- Don Wiper
- Coy Wire
- Tristan Wirfs
- Dennis Wirgowski
- Steven Wirtel
- Rashad Wisdom
- Terrence Wisdom
- Daniel Wise
- Deatrich Wise Jr.
- Mike Wise
- Phil Wise
- Gary Wisener
- Mitch Wishnowsky
- Jerron Wishom
- Jeff Wiska
- Pete Wismann
- Jerry Wisne
- Leo Wisniewski
- Stefen Wisniewski
- Steve Wisniewski
- Zeke Wissinger
- Al Wistert
- Grant Wistrom
- Al Witcher
- Dick Witcher
- Ahkello Witherspoon
- Brian Witherspoon
- Derrick Witherspoon
- Devon Witherspoon
- Terry Witherspoon
- Will Witherspoon
- Cal Withrow
- Cory Withrow
- Mike Withycombe
- John Witkowski
- Jon Witman
- Billy Witt
- Mel Witt
- Earl Witte
- Mark Witte
- Mike Witteck
- Jason Witten
- John Wittenborn
- Ray Witter
- Tom Wittum
- Casimir Witucki
- Bryan Witzmann
- Alex Wizbicki

== Wo ==
- Charlie Woerner
- Ernie Woerner
- Scott Woerner
- James Wofford
- Dave Wohlabaugh
- Richie Woit
- John Woitt
- Alex Wojciechowicz
- John Wojciechowski
- Gregory Wojcik
- Al Wolden
- Dick Wolf
- Ethan Wolf
- Jim Wolf
- Joe Wolf
- Derek Wolfe
- Garrett Wolfe
- Hugh Wolfe
- Earl Wolff
- Wayne Wolff
- Craig Wolfley
- Ron Wolfley
- John Wolford
- Oscar Wolford
- Will Wolford
- Bill Wolski
- Whitey Wolter
- Clem Woltman
- Bruce Womack
- Floyd Womack
- Jeff Womack
- Joe Womack
- Samuel Womack
- Royce Womble
- Bill Wondolowski
- Joe Wong
- Kailee Wong
- D.J. Wonnum
- George Wonsley
- Nathan Wonsley
- Otis Wonsley
- Wood
- Bill Wood
- Bo Wood
- Bobby Wood
- Cierre Wood
- Dick Wood
- Duane Wood
- Eric Wood
- Gary Wood
- John Wood
- Julius Wood
- Marv Wood
- Mike Wood
- Richard Wood
- Willie Wood
- Zach Wood
- Al Woodall
- Lee Woodall
- Cedric Woodard
- Dick Woodard
- Jackson Woodard
- Jonathan Woodard
- Ken Woodard
- Marc Woodard
- Ray Woodard
- Dennis Woodberry
- Tory Woodbury
- John Woodcock
- Colby Wooden
- Shawn Wooden
- Terry Wooden
- Tom Woodeshick
- Zac Woodfin
- Danny Woodhead
- Whitey Woodin
- David Woodley
- LaMarr Woodley
- Richard Woodley
- Doug Woodlief
- John Woodring
- Dwayne Woodruff
- Jim Woodruff
- Lee Woodruff
- Tony Woodruff
- Al Woods
- Antwaun Woods
- Carl Woods
- Charles Woods
- Chris Woods
- D'Juan Woods
- Don Woods
- Donovan Woods
- Flash Woods
- Glenn Woods
- Ickey Woods
- Jelani Woods
- Jerome Woods
- Jerry Woods
- Jimmy Woods
- Josh Woods
- JT Woods
- Larry Woods
- LeVar Woods
- Michael Woods II
- Mike Woods
- Pierre Woods
- Rashaun Woods
- Rick Woods
- Rob Woods
- Robert Woods (born 1950)
- Robert Woods (born 1955)
- Robert Woods (born 1992)
- Tony Woods (born 1965)
- Tony Woods (born 1966)
- Xavier Woods
- Keith Woodside
- Logan Woodside
- Abe Woodson
- Charles Woodson
- Craig Woodson
- Darren Woodson
- Freddie Woodson
- Marv Woodson
- Rod Woodson
- Xavier Woodson-Luster
- Damien Woody
- Wesley Woodyard
- Riq Woolen
- Scott Woolf
- Andre Woolfolk
- Butch Woolfolk
- Donnell Woolford
- Gary Woolford
- Rolly Woolsey
- Chandler Wooten
- John Wooten
- Khalid Wooten
- Mike Wooten
- Ron Wooten
- Tito Wooten
- Corey Wootton
- Barry Word
- Mark Word
- Roscoe Word
- Jahi Word-Daniels
- Jim Worden
- Neil Worden
- Stu Worden
- Jason Worilds
- Joe Work
- Blake Workman
- Hoge Workman
- Vince Workman
- Chris Worley
- Daryl Worley
- Tim Worley
- Chris Wormley
- Cameron Worrell
- Paul Worrilow
- Victor Worsley
- Barron Wortham
- Cornelius Wortham
- Naz Worthen
- Shawn Worthen
- Doug Worthington
- Chandler Worthy
- Jerel Worthy
- Xavier Worthy
- Keith Wortman
- Joe Wostoupal
- John Woudenberg
- Mike Woulfe
- John Wozniak

== Wr–Wy ==
- Tony Wragge
- Lud Wray
- Blidi Wreh-Wilson
- Darryl Wren
- Junior Wren
- Renell Wren
- George Wrighster
- Ab Wright
- Adrian Wright
- Alex Wright
- Alexander Wright
- Alvin Wright
- Anthony Wright
- Brandon Wright
- Brock Wright
- Charles Wright
- Dana Wright
- Darnell Wright
- Dwayne Wright
- Elmo Wright
- Eric Wright (born 1959)
- Eric Wright (born 1969)
- Eric Wright (born 1985)
- Ernie Wright
- Fearon Wright
- Felix Wright
- Gabe Wright
- George Wright
- Gordon Wright
- Isaiah Wright
- Jacardia Wright
- James Wright (born 1956)
- James Wright (born 1991)
- Jarius Wright
- Jason Wright
- Jaylen Wright
- Jeff Wright (born 1949)
- Jeff Wright (born 1963)
- Jim Wright (born 1921)
- Jim Wright (born 1939)
- John Wright (born 1920)
- John Wright (born 1946)
- Johnnie Wright
- K. J. Wright
- Keith Wright
- Kendall Wright
- Kenny Wright
- Kenyatta Wright
- Lawrence Wright
- Lonnie Wright
- Louis Wright
- Major Wright
- Manuel Wright
- Matthew Wright
- Mike Wright
- Nahshon Wright
- Nate Wright
- Owen Wright
- Ralph Wright
- Randy Wright
- Rayfield Wright
- Rejzohn Wright
- Rodrique Wright
- Ryan Wright
- Scooby Wright
- Shareece Wright
- Steve Wright (born 1942)
- Steve Wright (born 1959)
- Sylvester Wright
- Ted Wright
- Terry Wright
- Tim Wright
- Toby Wright
- Wallace Wright
- Willie Wright
- Tim Wrightman
- Claude Wroten
- Mansfield Wrotto
- Danny Wuerffel
- Al Wukits
- Jim Wulff
- Harry Wunsch
- Jerry Wunsch
- Fred Wyant
- Alvin Wyatt
- Antwuan Wyatt
- Devonte Wyatt
- Doug Wyatt
- Kervin Wyatt
- Kevin Wyatt
- Willie Wyatt
- James Wyche
- Sam Wyche
- Frank Wycheck
- Craig Wycinsky
- Doug Wycoff
- Frank Wydo
- John Wyhonic
- Lee Wykoff
- Pudge Wyland
- Andrew Wylie
- Devon Wylie
- Arnie Wyman
- Dave Wyman
- Devin Wyman
- Ellis Wyms
- DeShawn Wynn
- Dexter Wynn
- Isaiah Wynn
- Jarius Wynn
- Jonathan Wynn
- Kerry Wynn
- Milton Wynn
- Renaldo Wynn
- Shane Wynn
- Spergon Wynn
- Will Wynn
- Chet Wynne
- Elmer Wynne
- Harry Wynne
- Luke Wypler
- Jimmy Wyrick
- Pete Wysocki

== X ==
- Oshane Ximines
