= Freddie Washington =

Fred, Fredi or Freddie Washington may refer to:

- Fred Washington (offensive tackle) (1944–1985), American football offensive tackle
- Fred Washington (defensive tackle) (1967–1990), American football defensive tackle
- Fredi Washington (1903–1994), film actress in the 1920s and 1930s
- Freddie Washington (bassist), American jazz-influenced bass guitarist
- Freddie Washington (pianist) (c. 1900–?), American jazz pianist
- Freddie "Boom Boom" Washington, a character in the TV series Welcome Back, Kotter
- Freddie Washington (saxophone player), American jazz saxophone player, member of the St. Louis Metropolitan Jazz Quintet with Ronnie Burrage
