= Popek (surname) =

Popek is a Polish surname. Notable people with the surname include:

- Edward Popek (1919–2001), American flying ace
- Gerald J. Popek (1946–2008), American computer scientist
- Jacek Popek (born 1978), Polish football player
- Mark Popek (born 1990), American football player
- Tadeusz Popek (1915–1942), World War II Polish resistance member

== See also ==
- Popek (born 1978), Polish rapper and mixed martial arts fighter
- Popeck (born 1936), French comedian
