= Sumter High School =

Coordinates: 33.8973797°N 80.3928597°W

Location
- 2580 McCray's Mill Road; Sumter, South Carolina; United States

Information
- Type: Public high school
- Oversight: Sumter School District
- Principal: Anamaria Sandor
- Teaching staff: 123.00 (FTE)
- Grades: 9–12
- Enrollment: 2,214 (2023-2024)
- Student to teacher ratio: 18.00
- Campus: Suburb
- Colors: Royal blue and gold
- Mascot: Gamecocks
- Accreditation: South Carolina Department of Education and Southern Association of Colleges and Schools
- Newspaper: The Cock's Quill
- Yearbook: "The Paragon"
- Phone: (803) 481-4480
- Website: shs.sumterschools.net

Sumter High School is a co-educational four-year public high school serving grades 9 through 12 in Sumter School District located in the south side of Sumter, South Carolina, United States. With an enrollment of approximately 2,400 students, Sumter High is the second-largest high school in the Midlands of South Carolina and the fifth largest in the state of South Carolina. In 2004 Sumter High School was designated The Model School for SC and one of thirty model schools nationwide by a national organization funded by the Bill and Melinda Gates Foundation.

== History ==
What would contain the original Sumter High School high-school grades opened as the public Sumter Graded Schools of the town of Sumter, S. C. during racially segregated times for the fall semester of 1889 on September 2, 1889, with 310 white students and 294 non-white students with white boys of all grades separate in one building and girls in another and different location. Black students continued in the Lincoln School (which later became Lincoln High School). Over the subsequent decades of racial segregation, Sumter High School would become Edmunds High School beginning the fall semester of 1939. Dave Pettigrew, Sumter High School class of 1971, has created an on-line time-line of the evolution of Sumter High School.

Sumter High School was officially founded in 1970 with the merging of the student bodies of the two racially segregated city schools, Lincoln High School and Edmunds High School, the year that Freddie Solomon was a senior & quarterback of the merged football team. The Haynsworth Street Campus (Edmunds High) was for grades 11 and 12 while the Council Street Campus (Lincoln High) was for grade 10. The original school, built in 1925, was called "The Boys School" located on Haynsworth Street with "The Girls School" located on Calhoun Street. The Boys School and Girls School then became coeducational in 1939 on the Haynsworth Street school and was named Edmunds High School in memory of Superintendent Samuel Henry Edmunds. The Girls School became Calhoun Junior High and then McLaurin Junior High in 1950 in memory of Superintendent Linnie McLaurin. The colors were purple and white. This color combination represented the merging of the two junior high schools: McLaurin Junior High School, whose colors were red and white, and Alice Drive Junior High (now Alice Drive Middle School), with colors blue and white. In 1970, when Lincoln and Edmunds High Schools integrated and were renamed Sumter High School, the colors became the current blue and gold. In 1975 McLaurin Junior High became the Sumter High McLaurin campus for grade 9 making Sumter High a three-campus system. In 1980, Sumter High abandoned the McLaurin campus and 9th grade was moved to the Council Street Campus with 10th grade until the opening of the new Sumter High School on McCrays Mill Road in 1983.

The current location on McCrays Mill Road was opened in 1983 for grades 10 to 12, with the Haynsworth Street Campus for grade 9. Since opening, Sumter High has undergone many expansions and renovations. First expansion came in 1985 in what is now known as B Hall math department which opened in 1987. In 1987, grade 9 from the Haynsworth Street campus was moved to McCrays Mill Road. Then in 1987 expansion for C hall computer and social studies started and was completed in 1989, making Sumter High the largest high school in South Carolina. Again in 2003 a new main entrance and office was built, a second gym, new science wing and a new auditorium for the arts; the 2003 additions opened to students in fall 2005 for the Class of 2006. The 2003 renovations included a new guidance office and attendance office and renovations of science classes. Then in 2014 a new floor and new tables were added to the commons.

On July 1, 2011, Sumter School Districts 17 and 2 were consolidated into Sumter School District.

The original school on Haynsworth now houses the Sumter County Cultural Center, which includes the Sumter Gallery of Art, a Performing Arts Center known as Patriot Hall, and a drama theatre known as Sumter Little Theatre. The Haynsworth Street Campus also houses the Sumter County Recreation and Parks department and the Sumter School District Annex. The Council Street campus now houses Trinity Lincoln Center, part of Trinity United Methodist church on Liberty Street. The McLaurin Junior High School on Calhoun Street now houses Grace Baptist Church.

The Sumter High campus is home to the largest environmental center in the state, and has four classroom sites, walking paths and three boardwalks. The campus is home to the Sumter County Career Center, used by Sumter School District for teaching environmental and technical skills to young men and women for workforce or post-secondary education.

It has been an International Baccalaureate high school since 2001.

Sumter's feeder middle schools are Chestnut Oaks Middle, Alice Drive Middle and Bates Middle Schools.

== Sports ==
For athletics the Sumter High mascot are the Fighting Gamecocks, named after General Thomas Sumter, whom Sumter was named after and was known as "The Fighting Gamecock". Their mascot is known as Cocky Jr.

The Gamecocks' crosstown rivals are Crestwood High School and Lakewood High School. Sumter offers many sports to its student athletes during the autumn, winter and spring. Sports include many activities such as soccer, track, tennis, golf, football and baseball.

Men's sports at Sumter include baseball, basketball, cross country, football, golf, soccer, swimming, tennis, track, and wrestling.

Women's sports at Sumter High include basketball, bowling, cheerleading, cross country, golf, soccer, softball, swimming, volleyball, track, tennis, and wrestling.

In the 2008–09 year, SHS'S football team made it to the 4A Division I State Championships against James F. Byrnes High School, where it was held at Clemson University.

In spring 2006 the SHS baseball team beat Dorman High School for the State 4A Baseball Championship. In spring 2011 the SHS baseball team beat Byrnes High School for the State 4A Baseball Championship. In spring 2014 the SHS baseball team beat Northwestern High School for the State 4A Baseball Championship.

For football and track and field, Sumter High teams play at Memorial Stadium located to the east of the campus off Stadium Road. Adjacent to the school on the campus are the newly renovated baseball and softball stadiums, along with tennis and soccer. Golf is played at Sunset Country Club and swimming at the City of Sumter Aquatics Center.

== Notable alumni ==
- Art Baker, former college football head coach
- Ronnie Burgess, NFL defensive back
- Robert Clarkson, lawyer tax protestor
- Ricardo Colclough, NFL cornerback and Super Bowl XL champion with the Pittsburgh Steelers
- Tylee Craft, college football wide receiver, played at North Carolina
- Pat Crawford, MLB second baseman
- Dexter Davis, NFL defensive back
- O'Donnell Fortune, professional football cornerback
- Pressley Harvin III, NFL punter
- Jasper Johns, artist
- Raymond Johnson, NFL defensive end
- Terry Kinard, NFL safety and Super Bowl XXI champion with the New York Giants
- Grainger McKoy, artist
- Jordan Montgomery, MLB pitcher and 2023 World Series champion with the Texas Rangers
- Zion Nelson, offensive lineman for SMU Mustangs
- Cleveland Pinkney, NFL defensive tackle
- Bobby Richardson, MLB second baseman, 8x All-Star and 3x World Series champion with the New York Yankees
- Wally Richardson, NFL quarterback
- Freddie Solomon, NFL wide receiver and 2x Super Bowl champion with the San Francisco 49ers
- Greg Walker, NFL offensive tackle
- Eric Watts, NFL defensive end for the New York Jets
- Derrick Witherspoon, NFL running back and return specialist
