= Aaron Wallace =

American football player (born 1967)

No. 51, 99, 56, 59
- Position: Linebacker

Personal information
- Born: April 17, 1967 (age 59); Paris, Texas, U.S.
- Listed height: 6 ft 3 in (1.91 m)
- Listed weight: 240 lb (109 kg)

Career information
- High school: Franklin D. Roosevelt (Dallas, Texas)
- College: Texas A&M
- NFL draft: 1990: 2nd round, 37th overall pick

Career history
- Los Angeles/Oakland Raiders (1990–1995); Denver Broncos (1996)*; Oakland Raiders (1997–1998)
- * Offseason or practice squad member only

Awards and highlights
- PFWA All-Rookie Team (1990); First-team All-SWC (1988), (1989); Second-team All-SWC (1987)

Career NFL statistics
- Tackles: 168
- Sacks: 21
- Fumble recoveries: 6
- Stats at Pro Football Reference

Aaron Wallace (born April 17, 1967) is an American former professional football player who played his entire career as a linebacker for the Raiders franchise of the National Football League (NFL). He played college football for the Texas A&M Aggies.

Wallace attended Dallas Franklin D. Roosevelt High School (Dallas) where he was a teammate of future NFL players Richmond Webb and Kevin Williams.

While at Texas A&M from 1986 to 1989, Wallace accumulated 42 sacks for his career, which still rank him 1st all-time at Texas A&M. The 42 sacks also ranked him 7th all-time in the NCAA at the conclusion of his career and currently rank him 11th.

Wallace was selected by the Raiders in the second round of the 1990 NFL Draft. Wallace played eight seasons for the Raiders, compiling 155 tackles and 21 sacks. He retired in 1999 and did some work in real estate. He later returned to Texas A&M to earn his degree in agricultural and life sciences in 2002.

Wallace began his coaching career at Sunset High School, where he coached the defensive line for four seasons. He then served at H. Grady Spruce High School in 2007, the last season Spruce fielded athletic teams. After Spruce's disbandment of its sports squads, he moved to Emmett J. Conrad High School, though he discontinued coaching. He stopped coaching since he desired more time to see his son play football in San Diego. His son, Aaron Wallace Jr., played for the UCLA Bruins and was drafted in the 7th round of the 2016 NFL draft by the Tennessee Titans.

Wallace was inducted into the Texas Black Sports Hall of Fame in 2008.
