= 2012 Big East Conference football season =

- League: NCAA Division I FBS (Football Bowl Subdivision)
- Sport: football
- Duration: September 2012 – January 2013
- Teams: 8
- TV partner: ESPN-Big East Network

2013 NFL Draft
- Top draft pick: Justin Pugh (Syracuse)
- Picked by: New York Giants, 19th overall

Regular season
- Champions: Cincinnati, Louisville, Rutgers & Syracuse

Football seasons
- ← 2011 2013 (American) →

2012 Big East Conference football standings
	Conf.			Overall
Team	W		L	W		L
No. 13 Louisville $+	5	–	2	11	–	2
Cincinnati +	5	–	2	10	–	3
Rutgers +	5	–	2	9	–	4
Syracuse +	5	–	2	8	–	5
Pittsburgh	3	–	4	6	–	7
Connecticut	2	–	5	5	–	7
Temple	2	–	5	4	–	7
South Florida	1	–	6	3	–	9
$ – BCS representative as conference champion; + – Conference co-champions; Rankings from AP Poll

The 2012 Big East football season was the 22nd NCAA Division I FBS football season of the conference that was known as the Big East Conference from its formation in 1979 until July 2013, and ultimately proved to be the last for the conference under the "Big East" name, as well as the last with a full round-robin schedule for conference play. The conference consisted of eight football members: Cincinnati, Connecticut, Louisville, Pittsburgh, Rutgers, South Florida, Syracuse and Temple. In February 2012, the Big East settled a lawsuit with West Virginia University that allowed them to move to the Big 12 Conference effective July 1, 2012.

Conference members began regular-season play on August 30 when Temple hosted Villanova; conference play started September 6 when Cincinnati hosted Pittsburgh. The regular season concluded on December 1. Four teams—Louisville, Rutgers, Cincinnati, and Syracuse—claimed shares of the conference championship. Louisville claimed the league's automatic BCS bowl berth via tiebreakers.

On February 28, 2013, ESPN reported that the conference's seven schools that do not play FBS football, which had announced plans to leave the conference as a bloc no later than July 2015, had reached an agreement to leave in July 2013, and would keep the "Big East" name when they formed a new conference at that time. As a result, the schools that retained the original Big East charter would operate under a new name in the 2013 football season. On April 3, 2013, the remaining schools announced they would operate as the American Athletic Conference (The American).

== Previous season ==
West Virginia, Cincinnati and Louisville were co-Big East Champions with a conference record of 5–2. West Virginia received the conference's automatic bid into the BCS bid by way of tie-breakers. The Mountaineers went to the Orange Bowl and defeated Clemson 70–33 in the game, West Virginia tied or broke eight separate team and individual bowl game records, while the combined 69 points West Virginia and Clemson scored in the first half set another new record.

Four other Big East teams went to bowl games in 2011, finishing bowl play with a record of 3–2 as a conference. Louisville (7–6) lost to NC State in the Belk Bowl. Rutgers (9–4) beat Iowa State 27–17 in New Era Pinstripe Bowl. Cincinnati (10–3) defeated Vanderbilt in the Autozone Liberty Bowl, and Pittsburgh lost to SMU 28–6 in the BBVA Compass Bowl. The three teams not to go to a bowl game were Connecticut (5–7), South Florida (5–7), and Syracuse (5–7).

== Preseason ==
=== Coaching changes ===
Two teams have new head coaches for the 2012 season. Paul Chryst replaces Todd Graham at Pittsburgh, Kyle Flood replaces Greg Schiano at Rutgers.

=== Preseason Poll ===
The 2012 Big East Preseason Poll was announced at the Big East Media Day in Newport, RI on July 31, 2012

1. Louisville – 219 (24 first place votes)
2. South Florida – 176 (4)
3. Rutgers – 155
4. Cincinnati – 139
5. Pittsburgh – 131
6. Connecticut – 77
7. Syracuse – 70
8. Temple – 41

== Schedule ==
Index to colors and formatting
Big East member won
Big East member lost
Big East teams in **bold**

=== Week 1 ===
Date	Time	Visiting team	Home team	Site	TV	Result	Attendance	Ref.
August 30	7:30 pm	UMass	**Connecticut**	Rentschler Field • East Hartford, CT	SNY	**W** 37–0	35,270	
August 31	7:00 pm	Villanova	**Temple**	Lincoln Financial Field • Philadelphia, PA	ESPN3	**W** 31–10	32,709	
September 1	12:00 pm	Northwestern	**Syracuse**	Carrier Dome • Syracuse, NY	ESPN2	**L** 42–41	37,830	
September 1	6:00 pm	Youngstown State	**Pittsburgh**	Heinz Field • Pittsburgh, PA	ESPN3	**L** 31–17	40,837	
September 1	7:00 pm	Chattanooga	**South Florida**	Raymond James Stadium • Tampa, FL	ESPN3	**W** 34–13	41,285	
September 1	8:00 pm	**Rutgers**	Tulane	Mercedes-Benz Superdome • New Orleans, LA	CBSSN	**W** 24–12	26,059	
September 2	3:30 pm	Kentucky	No. 25 **Louisville**	Papa John's Cardinal Stadium • Louisville, KY (Governor's Cup)	ESPN	**W** 32–14	55,386	
^{#}Rankings from AP Poll released prior to game. All times are in Eastern Time.

Week off: Cincinnati

=== Week 2 ===
Date	Time	Visiting team	Home team	Site	TV	Result	Attendance	Ref.
September 6	8:00 pm	**Pittsburgh**	**Cincinnati**	Nippert Stadium • Cincinnati, OH (River City Rivalry)	ESPN	**CIN** 34–10	33,562	
September 8	12:00 pm	Maryland	**Temple**	Lincoln Financial Field • Philadelphia, PA	ESPNU	**L** 36–27	23,322	
September 8	12:00 pm	NC State	**Connecticut**	Rentschler Field • East Hartford, CT	Big East Network	**L** 10–7	34,202	
September 8	3:30 pm	**South Florida**	Nevada	Mackay Stadium • Reno, NV	CBSSN	**W** 32–31	22,804	
September 8	3:30 pm	No. 2 USC	**Syracuse**	MetLife Stadium • East Rutherford, NJ	ABC/ESPN2	**L** 42–29	39,507	
September 8	3:30 pm	Missouri State	No. 23 **Louisville**	Papa John's Cardinal Stadium • Louisville, KY	WHAS	**W** 35–7	47,553	
September 8	3:30 pm	Howard	**Rutgers**	High Point Solutions Stadium • Piscataway, NJ	SNY	**W** 26–0	50,855	
^{#}Rankings from AP Poll released prior to game. All times are in Eastern Time.

=== Week 3 ===
Date	Time	Visiting team	Home team	Site	TV	Result	Attendance	Ref.
September 13	7:30 p.m.	**Rutgers**	**South Florida**	Raymond James Stadium • Tampa, FL	ESPN	**RUT** 23–13	44,219	
September 15	12:00 p.m.	No. 13 Virginia Tech	**Pittsburgh**	Heinz Field • Pittsburgh, PA	ESPNU	**W** 35–17	48,032	
September 15	12:30 p.m.	**Connecticut**	Maryland	Chevy Chase Bank Field at Byrd Stadium • College Park, MD	ACC Network	**W** 24–21	35,491	
September 15	3:30 p.m.	North Carolina	No. 20 **Louisville**	Papa John's Cardinal Stadium • Louisville, KY	ABC/ESPN2	**W** 39–34	53,334	
September 15	4:00 p.m.	Stony Brook	**Syracuse**	Carrier Dome • Syracuse, NY	TWCS/SNY	**W** 28–17	34,512	
September 15	7:00 p.m.	Delaware State	**Cincinnati**	Nippert Stadium • Cincinnati, OH	ESPN3	**W** 23–7	27,112	
^{#}Rankings from AP Poll released prior to game. All times are in Eastern Time.

Week off: Temple

=== Week 4 ===
Date	Time	Visiting team	Home team	Site	TV	Result	Attendance	Ref.
September 22	7:00 p.m.	**Rutgers**	Arkansas	Donald W. Reynolds Razorback Stadium • Fayetteville, AR	ESPN	**W** 35–26	72,543	
September 22	2:00 p.m.	**Connecticut**	Western Michigan	Waldo Stadium • Kalamazoo, MI	ESPN3	**L** 30–24	10,328	
September 22	3:30 p.m.	**Temple**	Penn State	Beaver Stadium • University Park, PA	ABC/ESPN2	**L** 24–17	93,680	
September 22	3:30 p.m.	Gardner–Webb	**Pittsburgh**	Heinz Field • Pittsburgh, PA	ESPN3	**W** 55–10	36,452	
September 22	4:30 p.m.	**South Florida**	Ball State	Scheumann Stadium • Muncie, IN	ESPN3	**L** 31–27	16,397	
September 22	7:00 p.m.	No. 20 **Louisville**	FIU	FIU Stadium • Miami, FL	ESPN3	**W** 28–21	12,318	
September 22	8:00 p.m.	**Syracuse**	Minnesota	TCF Bank Stadium • Minneapolis, MN	BTN	**L** 17–10	50,805	
^{#}Rankings from AP Poll released prior to game. All times are in Eastern Time.

Week off: Cincinnati

=== Week 5 ===
Date	Time	Visiting team	Home team	Site	TV	Result	Attendance	Ref.
September 29	12:00 p.m.	Buffalo	**Connecticut**	Rentschler Field • East Hartford, CT	Big East Network	**L** 24–17	34,666	
September 29	3:30 p.m.	Virginia Tech	**Cincinnati**	FedExField • Landover, MD	ESPNU	**W** 27–24	46,026	
September 29	6:00 p.m.	No. 4 Florida State	**South Florida**	Raymond James Stadium • Tampa, FL	ESPN	**L** 30–17	69,383	
September 29	8:00 p.m.	No. 19 **Louisville**	Southern Miss	M. M. Roberts Stadium • Hattiesburg, MS	CBSSN	**W** 24–21	23,492	
^{#}Rankings from AP Poll released prior to game. All times are in Eastern Time.

Week off: Pittsburgh, Temple, Rutgers, Syracuse

=== Week 6 ===
Date	Time	Visiting team	Home team	Site	TV	Result	Attendance	Ref.
October 5	7:00 p.m.	**Pittsburgh**	**Syracuse**	Carrier Dome • Syracuse, NY	ESPN	**SYR** 14–13	40,394	
October 6	12:00 p.m.	**Connecticut**	No. 22 **Rutgers**	High Point Solutions Stadium • Piscataway, NJ	ESPNU	**RU** 19–3	50,870	
October 6	12:00 p.m.	**South Florida**	**Temple**	Lincoln Financial Field • Philadelphia, PA	Big East Network	**TEMP** 37–28	25,796	
October 6	7:00 p.m.	Miami (OH)	**Cincinnati**	Nippert Stadium • Cincinnati, OH (Victory Bell)	FS Ohio	**W** 52–14	35,097	
^{#}Rankings from AP Poll released prior to game. All times are in Eastern Time.

Week off: Louisville

=== Week 7 ===
Date	Time	Visiting team	Home team	Site	TV	Result	Attendance	Ref.
October 13	11:00 a.m.	No. 18 **Louisville**	**Pittsburgh**	Heinz Field • Pittsburgh, PA	ESPNU	**LOU** 45–35	42,432	
October 13	12:00 p.m.	**Syracuse**	No. 20 **Rutgers**	High Point Solutions Stadium • Piscataway, NJ	Big East Network	**RUT** 23–15	48,011	
October 13	1:00 p.m.	**Temple**	**Connecticut**	Rentschler • East Hartford, CT	ESPN3	**TEMP** 17–14	37,279	
October 13	7:00 p.m.	Fordham	No. 21 **Cincinnati**	Nippert Stadium • Cincinnati, OH	ESPN3	**W** 49–17	26,317	
^{#}Rankings from AP Poll released prior to game. All times are in Eastern Time.

Week off: South Florida

=== Week 8 ===
Date	Time	Visiting team	Home team	Site	TV	Result	Attendance	Ref.
October 19	8:00 p.m.	**Connecticut**	**Syracuse**	Carrier Dome • Syracuse, NY	ESPN	**SYR** 40–10	36,715	
October 20	12:00 p.m.	No. 19 **Rutgers**	**Temple**	Lincoln Financial Field • Philadelphia, PA	Big East Network	**RUT** 35–10	35,145	
October 20	3:30 p.m.	**South Florida**	No. 17 **Louisville**	Papa John's Cardinal Stadium • Louisville, KY	ABC	**LOU** 27–25	50,167	
October 20	3:30 p.m.	**Pittsburgh**	Buffalo	UB Stadium • Amherst, NY	Big East Network/ESPN Plus	**W** 20–6	17,021	
October 20	7:00 p.m.	No. 21 **Cincinnati**	Toledo	Glass Bowl • Toledo, OH	ESPN3	**L** 23–29	24,124	
^{#}Rankings from AP Poll released prior to game. All times are in Eastern Time.

=== Week 9 ===
Date	Time	Visiting team	Home team	Site	TV	Result	Attendance	Ref.
October 26	8:00 p.m.	**Cincinnati**	**Louisville**	Papa John's Cardinal Stadium • Louisville, KY (The Keg of Nails)	ESPN	**LOU** 31–34 ^{OT}	53,271	
October 27	12:00 p.m.	**Temple**	**Pittsburgh**	Heinz Field • Pittsburgh, PA	Big East Network	**PITT** 47–17	42,425	
October 27	3:30 p.m.	Kent State	**Rutgers**	High Point Solutions Stadium • Piscataway, NJ	Big East Network/ESPN Plus	**L** 33–25	49,345	
October 27	7:00 p.m.	**Syracuse**	**South Florida**	Raymond James Stadium • Tampa, FL	ESPN3	**SYR** 37–36	38,562	
^{#}Rankings from AP Poll released prior to game. All times are in Eastern Time.

Week off: Connecticut

=== Week 10 ===
Date	Time	Visiting team	Home team	Site	TV	Result	Attendance	Ref.
November 3	12:00 p.m.	**Syracuse**	**Cincinnati**	Nippert Stadium • Cincinnati, OH	Big East Network	**CIN** 35–24	26,180	
November 3	12:00 p.m.	**Temple**	**Louisville**	Papa John's Cardinal Stadium • Louisville, KY	ABC	**LOU** 45–17	44,609	
November 3	3:30 p.m.	**Pittsburgh**	Notre Dame	Notre Dame Stadium • Notre Dame, IN	NBC	**L** 26–29 ^{3OT}	80,795	
November 3	7:00 p.m.	**Connecticut**	**South Florida**	Raymond James Stadium •	ESPNU	**USF** 13–6	36,190	
^{#}Rankings from AP Poll released prior to game. All times are in Eastern Time.

Week off: Rutgers

=== Week 11 ===
Date	Time	Visiting team	Home team	Site	TV	Result	Attendance	Ref.
November 9	8:00 p.m.	**Pittsburgh**	**Connecticut**	Rentschler Field • East Hartford, CT	ESPN2	**UCONN** 24–17	33,503	
November 10	12:00 p.m.	**Cincinnati**	**Temple**	Lincoln Financial Field • Philadelphia, PA	Big East Network	**CIN** 34–10	20,192	
November 10	12:00 p.m.	**Louisville**	**Syracuse**	Carrier Dome • Syracuse, NY	ABC	**SYR** 45–26	40,312	
November 10	12:00 p.m.	Army	**Rutgers**	High Point Solutions Stadium • Piscataway, NJ	ESPNU	**W** 28–7	43,250	
^{#}Rankings from AP Poll released prior to game. All times are in Eastern Time.

Week off: South Florida

=== Week 12 ===
Date	Time	Visiting team	Home team	Site	TV	Result	Attendance	Ref.
November 17	12:00 p.m.	#22 **Rutgers**	**Cincinnati**	Nippert Stadium • Cincinnati, OH	Big East Network	**RUT** 10–3	34,526	
November 17	12:00 p.m.	**Temple**	Army	Michie Stadium • West Point, NY	CBSSN	**W** 63–32	27,019	
November 17	3:00 p.m.	**South Florida**	Miami	Sun Life Stadium • Miami Gardens, FL	ACC Network	**L** 9–40	38,869	
November 17	7:00 p.m.	**Syracuse**	Missouri	Faurot Field • Columbia, MO	ESPNU	**W** 31–27	63,045	
^{#}Rankings from AP Poll released prior to game. All times are in Eastern Time.

Week off: Louisville, Pittsburgh

=== Week 13 ===
Date	Time	Visiting team	Home team	Site	TV	Result	Attendance	Ref.
November 23	11:00 a.m.	**Syracuse**	**Temple**	Lincoln Financial Field • Philadelphia, PA	ESPN2	**SYR** 38–20	22,317	
November 23	7:00 p.m.	**South Florida**	**Cincinnati**	Nippert Stadium • Cincinnati, OH	ESPN	**CIN** 27–10	21,171	
November 24	12:00 p.m.	**Connecticut**	#20 **Louisville**	Papa John's Cardinal Stadium • Louisville, KY	Big East Network	**UCONN** 23–20 ^{3OT}	45,618	
November 24	12:00 p.m.	#18 **Rutgers**	**Pittsburgh**	Heinz Field • Pittsburgh, PA	TBA	**PIT** 27–6	38,786	
^{#}Rankings from AP Poll released prior to game. All times are in Eastern Time.

=== Week 14 ===
Going into the final week of the season, Rutgers had clinched at least a share of the Big East title, but it was possible that the season could end with a three-way or a four-way tie for the conference championship. The scenarios were:

- Rutgers would win the title and the Big East BCS berth outright with a win over Louisville on November 29.
- If Louisville won, it would create a three-way tie between the two schools and Syracuse. Cincinnati could then join the logjam atop the conference with a win over UConn on December 1.

The conference's BCS berth would then be decided by tiebreakers. Under Big East rules, the first tiebreaker among three or more teams is head-to-head record among the tied teams, followed by the BCS standings.

A three-way tie would go to the BCS standings, since Louisville, Rutgers, and Syracuse finished 1–1 against one another. In a four-way tie, Cincinnati and Syracuse would be eliminated with 1–2 records against the other three teams, with the BCS berth then going to the higher-ranked team between Louisville and Rutgers. The conference said that Louisville would most likely receive the BCS berth if it defeated Rutgers, and that proved to be the case, with the Cardinals claiming the league's BCS berth.

Date	Time	Visiting team	Home team	Site	TV	Result	Attendance	Ref.
November 29	7:30 pm	**Louisville**	**Rutgers**	High Point Solutions Stadium • Piscataway, NJ	ESPN	**LOU** 20–17	52,798	
December 1	3:30 p.m.	**Cincinnati**	**Connecticut**	Rentschler Field • East Hartford, CT	ABC	**CIN** 34–17	33,112	
December 1	7:00 p.m.	**Pittsburgh**	**South Florida**	Raymond James Stadium • Tampa, FL	ESPN2	**PITT** 20–7	35,141	
^{#}Rankings from AP Poll released prior to game. All times are in Eastern Time.

Week off: Temple, Syracuse

== Records against other conferences ==
=== Big East vs. BCS matchups ===
Date	Visitor	Home	Winning team	Opponent Conference
September 1	Northwestern	Syracuse	Northwestern	Big Ten
September 2	Kentucky	#25 Louisville	Louisville	SEC
September 8	Maryland	Temple	Maryland	ACC
September 8	NC State	Connecticut	NC State	ACC
September 8	USC	Syracuse	USC	Pac-12
September 15	Virginia Tech	Pittsburgh	Pittsburgh	ACC
September 15	Connecticut	Maryland	Connecticut	ACC
September 15	North Carolina	Louisville	Louisville	ACC
September 22	Rutgers	Arkansas	Rutgers	SEC
September 22	Temple	Penn State	Penn State	Big Ten
September 22	Syracuse	Minnesota	Minnesota	Big Ten
September 29	Virginia Tech	Cincinnati	Cincinnati	ACC
September 29	Florida State	South Florida	Florida State	ACC
November 3	Pittsburgh	Notre Dame	Notre Dame	Independent
November 17	Syracuse	Missouri	Syracuse	SEC

== Bowl Games ==
Date	Time	Visiting team	Home team	Site	TV	Result	Attendance	Ref.
December 27*	6:30 p.m.	Cincinnati	Duke	Bank of America Stadium • Charlotte, NC (Belk Bowl)	ESPN	W 48–34	48,128	
December 28*	5:30 p.m.	Rutgers	Virginia Tech	Citrus Bowl • Orlando, FL (Russell Athletic Bowl)	ESPN	L 10–13	48,127	
December 29*	3:15 p.m.	West Virginia	Syracuse	Yankee Stadium • Bronx, NY (Pinstripe Bowl)	ESPN	W 38–14	39,098	
January 2*	8:30 p.m.	No. 21 Louisville	No. 3 Florida	Mercedes-Benz Superdome • New Orleans, LA (Sugar Bowl)	ESPN	W 33–23	54,178	
January 5*	1:00 p.m.	Pittsburgh	Ole Miss	Legion Field • Birmingham, AL (BBVA Compass Bowl)	ESPN	L 17–38	59,135	
^{#}Rankings from AP Poll released prior to game. All times are in Eastern Time.

== Players of the week ==
Following each week of games, Big East conference officials select the players of the week from the conference's teams.

Week	Offensive			Defensive			Special teams		
Week	Player	Position	Team	Player	Position	Team	Player	Position	Team
9/3/12	Ryan Nassib	QB	Syracuse	Yawin Smallwood	LB	Connecticut	Brandon McManus	K/P	Temple
9/10/12	Andre Davis	WR	South Florida	Walter Stewart	DE	Cincinnati	Brandon Jones	CB	Rutgers
9/17/12	Tino Sunseri	QB	Pittsburgh	Yawin Smallwood	LB	Connecticut	Nick Williams	WR	Connecticut
9/24/12	Gary Nova	QB	Rutgers	Adrian Bushell	CB	Louisville	Brandon McManus	K/P	Temple
10/1/12	Munchie Legaux	QB	Cincinnati	Maalik Bomar	LB	Cincinnati	Pat O'Donnell	P	Cincinnati
10/8/12	Montel Harris	RB	Temple	Brandon Sharpe	DE	Syracuse	Tony Miliano	K	Cincinnati
10/15/12	Senorise Perry	RB	Louisville	Khaseem Greene	LB	Rutgers	Brandon McManus	K/P	Temple
10/22/12	Gary Nova	QB	Rutgers	Lorenzo Mauldin	DE	Louisville	Ross Krautman	K	Syracuse
10/29/12	Teddy Bridgewater	QB	Louisville	Preston Brown	LB	Louisville	Maikon Bonani	K	South Florida
11/5/12	George Winn	RB	Cincinnati	Keith Brown	LB	Louisville	Matt Brown	RB	Temple
11/11/12	Alec Lemon	WR	Syracuse	Khaseem Greene	LB	Rutgers	Nick Williams	RB	Connecticut

== Rankings ==
Legend
	Increase in ranking
	Decrease in ranking
	Not ranked previous week
RV	Received votes but were not ranked in Top 25 of poll

		Pre	Sept. 4	Sept. 9	Sept. 16	Sept. 23	Sept. 30	Oct. 7	Oct. 14	Oct. 21	Oct. 28	Nov. 4	Nov. 11	Nov. 18	Nov. 25	Dec. 2	Final
Cincinnati	AP	RV	RV		RV	RV	RV	21	21	RV							
Cincinnati	C	RV	RV	RV	RV	RV	23	20	18	RV							
Cincinnati	Harris	Not released						20	18	RV							
Cincinnati	BCS	Not released							21								
Connecticut	AP																
Connecticut	C																
Connecticut	Harris	Not released															
Connecticut	BCS	Not released															
Louisville	AP	25	23	19	20	19	19	18	16	16							
Louisville	C	RV	24	20	18	17	16	16	14	14							
Louisville	Harris	Not released						18	16	14							
Louisville	BCS	Not released							16	16							
Pittsburgh	AP																
Pittsburgh	C																
Pittsburgh	Harris	Not released															
Pittsburgh	BCS	Not released															
Rutgers	AP				RV	23	22	20	19	18							
Rutgers	C	RV	RV	RV	RV	25 т	21	19	17	15							
Rutgers	Harris	Not released						19	17	15							
Rutgers	BCS	Not released							15	15							
South Florida	AP	RV	RV	RV													
South Florida	C	RV	RV	RV													
South Florida	Harris	Not released															
South Florida	BCS	Not released															
Syracuse	AP																
Syracuse	C																
Syracuse	Harris	Not released															
Syracuse	BCS	Not released															
Temple	AP																
Temple	C																
Temple	Harris	Not released															
Temple	BCS	Not released															

== Home attendance ==
Team	Stadium	Capacity	Game 1	Game 2	Game 3	Game 4	Game 5	Game 6	Game 7	Total	Average	% of Capacity
Cincinnati	Nippert Stadium	35,097	33,562	27,112	35,097	26,317	26,180	34,526	21,171	203,965	29,138	83%
Connecticut	Rentschler Field	40,000	35,270	34,202	34,666	37,279	33,503	33,112	—	208,032	34,672	87%
Louisville	Papa John's Cardinal Stadium	55,000	55,386	47,553	53,334	50,167	53,271	44,609	45,618	349,938	49,991	91%
Pittsburgh	Heinz Field	65,050	40,837	48,032	36,452	42,432	42,245	38,786	—	248,964	41,494	64%
Rutgers	High Point Solutions Stadium	52,454	50,855	50,870	48,011	49,345	43,250	52,798	—	295,129	49,188	94%
South Florida	Raymond James Stadium	65,897	41,285	44,219	69,383	38,562	36,190	35,141	—	264,780	44,130	67%
Syracuse	Carrier Dome	49,262	37,830	34,512	40,394	36,715	40,312	—	—	189,763	37,953	77%
Temple	Lincoln Financial Field	68,532	32,709	23,322	25,796	35,145	20,192	22,317	—	159,481	26,580	39%

=== Neutral Site Games ===
Team	Stadium	Capacity	Game	Average	% of Capacity
Cincinnati	FedExField vs Virginia Tech	91,704	46,026	46,026	50%
Syracuse	MetLife Stadium vs USC	82,566	39,507	39,507	47%

== Big East Conference Awards ==
The following individuals received postseason honors as voted by the Big East Conference football coaches.

2012 Big East Football Individual Awards
Award	Recipient(s)
Offensive Player of the Year	Teddy Bridgewater, QB, Louisville
Defensive Player of the Year	Khaseem Greene, LB, Rutgers
Special Teams Player of the Year	Matt Brown, RB/KR, Temple
Rookie of the Year	Tyler Matakevich, LB, Temple
Coach of the Year	Kyle Flood, Rutgers; Charlie Strong, LOUISVILLE

2012 All-Big East Conference Football Teams
First Team		Second Team	
Offense	Defense	Offense	Defense
WR – Alec Lemon,^{†} Syracuse; WR – DeVante Parker, Louisville; OT – Eric Lefeld, Cincinnati; OT – Justin Pugh, Syracuse; OG – Austen Bujnoch, Cincinnati; OG – Antwan Lowery, Rutgers; C – Mario Benavides, Louisville; TE – Travis Kelce, Cincinnati; QB – Teddy Bridgewater, Louisville; RB – Ray Graham, Pittsburgh; RB – Montel Harris, Temple; K – Maikon Bonani, USF; RS – Matt Brown, Temple	DL – Dan Giordano, Cincinnati; DL – Trevardo Williams,^{†} Connecticut; DL – Aaron Donald, Pittsburgh; DL – Scott Vallone, Rutgers; LB – Greg Blair, Cincinnati; LB – Sio Moore, Connecticut; LB – Yawin Smallwood, Connecticut; LB – Khaseem Greene,^{†} Rutgers; CB – Adrian Bushell, Louisville; CB – Logan Ryan, Rutgers; S – Duron Harmon, Rutgers; S – Shamarko Thomas, Syracuse; P – Brandon McManus, Temple	WR – Mike Shanahan, Pittsburgh; WR – Devin Street, Pittsburgh; WR – Brandon Coleman, Rutgers; OT – Alex Kupper, Louisville; OT – Kaleb Johnson, Rutgers; OT – Martin Wallace, Temple; OG – Adam Masters, Connecticut; OG – Mark Popek, USF; C – Ryan Turnley, Pittsburgh; QB – Ryan Nassib, Syracuse; TE – Ryan Griffin, Connecticut; RB – George Winn, Cincinnati; RB – Jawan Jamison, Rutgers; K – Brandon McManus, Temple; RS – Nick Williams, Connecticut	DL – Walter Stewart, Cincinnati; DL – Cory Grissom, USF; DL – Brandon Sharpe, Syracuse; DL – John Youboty, Temple; LB – Preston Brown, Louisville; LB – Sam Barrington, USF; LB – Tyler Matakevich, Temple; CB – Dwayne Gratz, Connecticut; CB – Blidi Wreh-Wilson, Connecticut; S – Calvin Pryor, Louisville; S – Hakeem Smith, Louisville; S – Jason Hendricks, Pittsburgh; P – Pat O'Donnell, Cincinnati; P – Justin Brockhaus-Kann, USF
^{†} - denotes unanimous selection Additional players added to the All-Big East teams due to ties in the voting
