= Tylee Craft =

American football player (2001–2024)

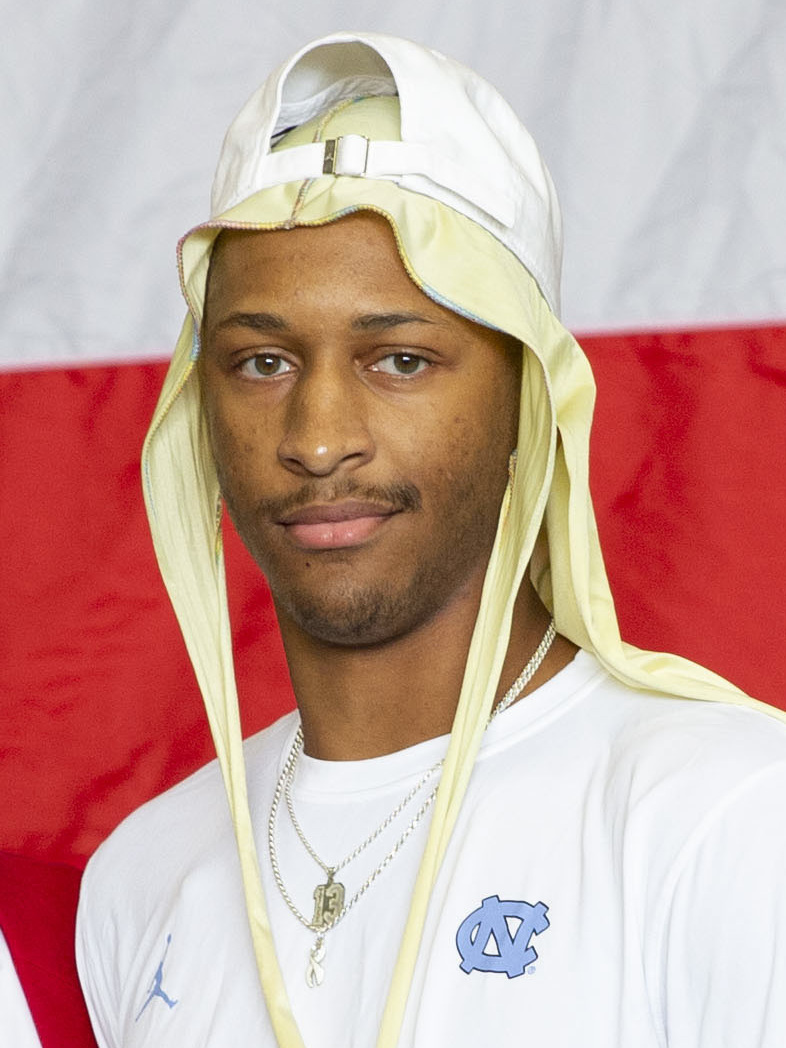
- Craft in 2022

Profile
- Position: Wide receiver

Personal information
- Born: October 1, 2001; Sumter, South Carolina, U.S.
- Died: October 12, 2024 (aged 23); Pittsboro, North Carolina, U.S.
- Listed height: 6 ft 5 in (1.96 m)
- Listed weight: 200 lb (91 kg)

Career information
- High school: Sumter (Sumter, South Carolina)
- College: North Carolina (2020–2024)
- Stats at ESPN

Tylee Craft (October 1, 2001 – October 12, 2024) was an American college football player who competed as a wide receiver for the University of North Carolina (UNC) Tar Heels. Known for his involvement on special teams and offensive plays, Craft joined UNC in 2020 after graduating from Sumter High School in Sumter, South Carolina.

== Early life ==
A native of Sumter, South Carolina, Craft was born on October 1, 2001. He attended Sumter High School, where he was a standout football player. He accumulated 59 catches, 993 yards and 11 touchdowns during his junior and senior seasons at Sumter. In his junior year, Sumter's football team had a 10–1 record and made it to the second round of the Class 5A state playoffs.

== College career ==
Craft appeared in several games during the 2020 and 2021 seasons, contributing both on offense and special teams for the North Carolina Tar Heels football team. However, before the 2022 season, he was diagnosed with a rare form of lung cancer, Stage 4 large cell neuroendocrine carcinoma, which required him to step back from active play. Despite his illness, Craft remained closely connected to the football program, attending practices and offering support to teammates as a student coach throughout his treatment. He graduated from the University of North Carolina at Chapel Hill in May 2024.

=== Recognition and retirement ===
In recognition of his courage, Craft received the 2022 Disney Spirit Award, presented annually to the most inspirational player in college football. He was named to the Uplifting Athletes Rare Disease Champion team, honored as an ambassador for the White Ribbon Project, and nominated for the 2024 Capital One Orange Bowl-FWAA Courage Award. He was recognized by the V Foundation.

Although he hoped to return to the field, Craft announced his retirement from football in July 2024, focusing on his health and family.

== Death and legacy ==
Craft died of lung cancer on October 12, 2024, at the age of 23.

His death was marked by tributes from the UNC football community, including a ceremony during a game on Cancer Awareness Day. The team honored Craft by featuring his jersey number and continuing the "Tylee Strong" initiative. UNC announced plans to name a nutrition center after him, ensuring his legacy remains part of the university's athletic program. Coach Mack Brown had a close relationship with Craft.

== See also ==
- List of gridiron football players who died during their careers
