= Alex Kupper =

American football player (born 1990)

No. 62
- Position: Offensive guard

Personal information
- Born: February 14, 1990 (age 36); Louisville, Kentucky, U.S.
- Listed height: 6 ft 2 in (1.88 m)
- Listed weight: 299 lb (136 kg)

Career information
- College: Louisville
- NFL draft: 2013: undrafted

Career history
- Houston Texans (2013–2014); Buffalo Bills (2015)*
- * Offseason or practice squad member only

Awards and highlights
- Second-team All-Big East (2012)

Alex Kupper (born February 14, 1990) is an American former football offensive guard. Kupper played offensive line for the University of Louisville and was signed as an undrafted free agent by the Houston Texans in 2013. He spent the majority of the 2013 season on the Texans' practice squad before being activated to the game-day roster in November. He was placed on the Texans' 2014 practice squad. On January 6, 2015, Kupper was signed to a reserve/future contract by the Buffalo Bills. On September 4, 2015, he was released by the Bills.
