= Richmond Webb =

American football player (born 1967)

No. 73, 78
- Position: Offensive tackle

Personal information
- Born: January 11, 1967 (age 59); Dallas, Texas, U.S.
- Listed height: 6 ft 6 in (1.98 m)
- Listed weight: 325 lb (147 kg)

Career information
- High school: Dallas Roosevelt
- College: Texas A&M
- NFL draft: 1990: 1st round, 9th overall pick

Career history
- Miami Dolphins (1990–2000); Cincinnati Bengals (2001–2002)

Awards and highlights
- 2× First Team All-Pro (1992, 1994); 2× Second Team All-Pro (1993, 1995); 7× Pro Bowl (1990–1996); NFL 1990s All-Decade Team; PFWA All-Rookie Team (1990); Miami Dolphins Honor Roll; First-team All-SWC (1989); Second-team All-SWC (1988)

Career NFL statistics
- Games played: 184
- Games started: 183
- Fumble recoveries: 4
- Stats at Pro Football Reference

Richmond Jewel Webb (born January 11, 1967) is an American former professional football player who was an offensive tackle in the National Football League (NFL) with the Miami Dolphins and the Cincinnati Bengals. Webb played college football for the Texas A&M Aggies. He was selected by the Dolphins as the ninth overall pick in the 1990 NFL draft.

== Professional career ==
He played for the Dolphins for 11 seasons and set team records for 118 consecutive starts and seven consecutive Pro Bowls. After playing for the Dolphins, Webb played two seasons for the Bengals. His career declined due to injuries, and though he tried out for the Dolphins in 2003, Webb wasn't signed and he decided to retire in the fall of 2004. On July 9, 2005, Webb signed a one-day contract to retire as a member of the Dolphins.

On December 25, 2006, Webb was inducted into the Dolphins Honor Roll. He was the second Miami player to be inducted in 2006, following Dick Anderson, and the 16th overall.

Webb attended Dallas Independent School District's Roosevelt High School, where his teammates included future NFL players Aaron Wallace and Kevin Williams.
