= Franklin D. Roosevelt High School (Texas) =

Public school in Dallas, Texas, United States

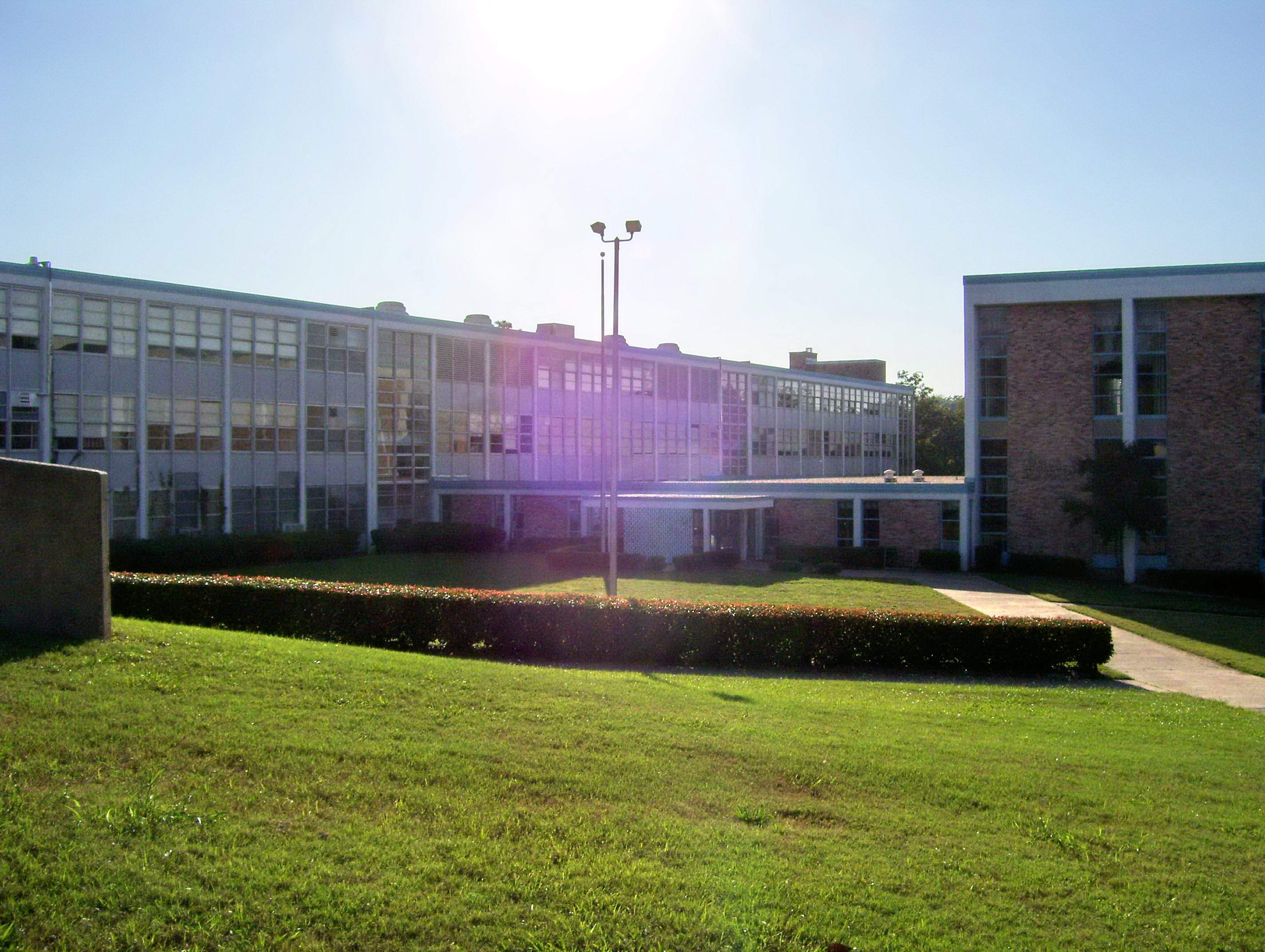

Location
- 525 Bonnie View Road; Dallas, Texas 75216; United States; 32.74175°N 96.79532°W

Information
- Other name: Roosevelt High School
- School type: Public, comprehensive high school
- Motto: Pride, Respect, and Responsibility
- Founded: 1963; 63 years ago
- Locale: City: large
- School district: Dallas Independent School District
- Principal: Joseph Abrams
- Teaching staff: 56.97 (FTE)
- Grades: 9-12
- Enrollment: 677 (2023-2024)
  - Grade 9: 216
  - Grade 10: 178
  - Grade 11: 157
  - Grade 12: 126
- Student to teacher ratio: 11.88
- Language: English
- Colors: Columbia blue white red navy
- Sports: Baseball, basketball, cross country, football, golf, soccer, softball, swimming, tennis, track & field, volleyball, & wrestling
- Mascot: Mustang
- Team name: Mighty Mustangs
- Communities served: Oak Cliff
- Feeder schools: Oliver W. Holmes Humanities/Communications Academy now John Lewis Social Justice Academy
- Students considered a racial minority: 649 (99.4%) (2016-17)
- Students not considered a racial minority: 4 (0.6%) (2016-17)
- Website: www.dallasisd.org/roosevelt
- Last updated: September 9, 2019; 6 years ago

Franklin D. Roosevelt High School is a public school in the Oak Cliff area of Dallas, Texas, United States, serving grades 9–12. The school opened in 1963, and is part of the Dallas Independent School District.

The school serves several South Dallas communities, including Cadillac Heights and some Oak Cliff neighborhoods.

== History ==
Construction of the school began in 1961 at 525 Bonnie View Road in the Oak Cliff area. Built before the school district integrated its high schools, the campus was the first new "Negro high school" built in Dallas since 1939 at the time it opened in January 1963. The school was built to serve a maximum capacity of 2000 students. At its opening, it was expected to draw about 1200 students from the Oak Cliff area, most having previously attended Madison High School — which had itself been converted to a "Negro school" in 1956 to relieve overcrowding at Booker T. Washington and Lincoln high schools.

The school is named after Franklin Delano Roosevelt, the 32nd U.S. president, in honor of his death and his assistance to lower class citizens. The school colors chosen were Columbia blue, white, and cardinal red. The most recent colors used for FDR are navy blue, light blue and white.

In 2005, after the closure of Wilmer-Hutchins High School. Roosevelt absorbed some WHISD high school students.

In 2011 the district re-opened Wilmer Hutchins High. Some former WHISD zones covered by Roosevelt were rezoned to Wilmer-Hutchins.

== Notable alumni ==
Name	Class Year	Notability	Reference
Waymond Bryant	1969 (?)	former American football linebacker, played for the Chicago Bears	
Donnie Echols	1976	former NFL football tight end who played for the Houston Oilers, New Orleans Saints and Cleveland Browns	
Jeff Fuller	1980	former NFL football safety who played for the San Francisco 49ers 1984–1989; played in two Super Bowls as a member of the 49ers	
Roy Martin	1985	sprinter, US high school record holder	
Aaron Wallace		NFL player	
Richmond Webb		NFL player; 7-time NFL pro bowler and 5-time all-pro selection	
Kevin Williams	1989 (?)	former football wide receiver in the NFL for the Dallas Cowboys, Arizona Cardinals, Buffalo Bills and San Francisco 49ers	

== See also ==
- History of African Americans in Dallas-Fort Worth
