= Cleveland Pinkney =

American football player (born 1977)

No. 61, 62
- Position: Defensive tackle

Personal information
- Born: September 14, 1977 (age 49); Sumter, South Carolina, U.S.
- Listed height: 6 ft 1 in (1.85 m)
- Listed weight: 300 lb (136 kg)

Career information
- High school: Sumter
- College: South Carolina
- NFL draft: 2001: undrafted

Career history
- Indianapolis Colts (2001); San Francisco 49ers (2002)*; Berlin Thunder (2002); Tampa Bay Buccaneers (2003); Atlanta Falcons (2004); Carolina Panthers (2004–2005); Berlin Thunder (2005); Seattle Seahawks (2005)*; Detroit Lions (2006)
- * Offseason or practice squad member only
- Stats at Pro Football Reference

Cleveland Pinkney III (born September 14, 1977) is an American former professional football player who was a defensive tackle in the National Football League (NFL). He played college football for the South Carolina Gamecocks.

Pinkney attended and played football at Sumter High School. He graduated from the University of South Carolina. He was signed as an undrafted free agent by the Tampa Bay Buccaneers and has also played for the Carolina Panthers and Detroit Lions.
