= Cadillac Heights, Dallas =

Neighborhood in East Oak Cliff, Dallas, Texas

Coordinates: 32.738°N 96.784°W

Cadillac Heights is a neighborhood in East Oak Cliff, Dallas, Texas. The neighborhood is mostly African American and Hispanic. The area has historically suffered from high levels of lead pollution from the operation of nearby smelters.

As of 2010 there were plans both to demolish all of Cadillac Heights, and to establish the new Dallas Police Department police academy in the community.

== History ==
Peter Johnson, a community activist, said that Cadillac Heights was "a community that was poisoned; the earth had been polluted. And it stunk. Most of those people were sick with cancer and kidney problems. The children had birth defects and some had lead poisoning. The city didn’t pay attention to their problems. Lead was a part of that community for a long time."

== Cityscape ==
The community is in proximity to Downtown Dallas. Henry Tatum of The Dallas Morning News said "Americans have spent years calling prestigious products the Cadillac of this or the Cadillac of that. Cadillac Heights isn't the Cadillac of residential neighborhoods." The community, located in proximity to the Trinity River, consists of 200 small frame houses, which were mostly built in the 1940s. Metal industries, a meat packing plant, and a water treatment facility surround the houses on three sides. The streets are narrow and thinly paved. The neighborhood has few walkable sidewalks, dirt ravines, and no concrete curbs. Pit bulls wander freely on those streets. The neighborhood floods easily. The Cadillac Heights Levee was proposed to protect the community.

== Education ==
Residents are zoned to schools in the Dallas Independent School District.

The zoned schools include Albert Sidney Johnston Elementary School, Oliver Wendell Holmes Middle School, and Franklin D. Roosevelt High School.

== See also ==
- Oak Cliff
