= Nick Williams (wide receiver) =

American football player (born 1990)

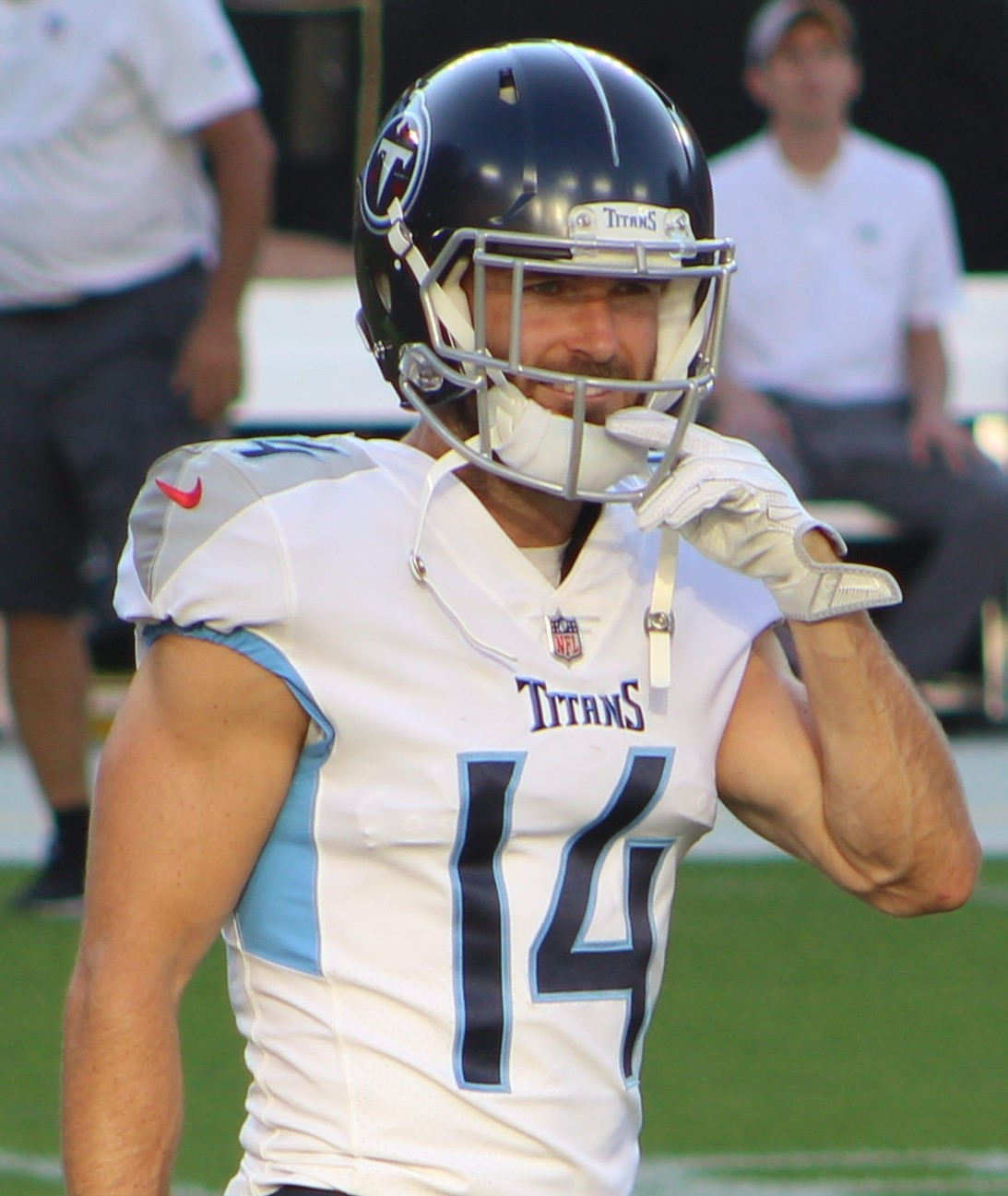
- Williams with the Tennessee Titans in 2018

No. 13, 15, 14, 86
- Position: Wide receiver

Personal information
- Born: November 23, 1990 (age 35); Hightstown, New Jersey, U.S.
- Listed height: 5 ft 10 in (1.78 m)
- Listed weight: 184 lb (83 kg)

Career information
- High school: Hun School (Princeton, New Jersey)
- College: Connecticut
- NFL draft: 2013: undrafted

Career history
- Washington Redskins (2013–2014); Atlanta Falcons (2015–2017); Tennessee Titans (2018); Los Angeles Rams (2018); Denver Broncos (2019)*; San Francisco 49ers (2019)*
- * Offseason or practice squad member only

Awards and highlights
- 2× Second-team All-Big East (2010, 2012)

Career NFL statistics
- Receptions: 30
- Receiving yards: 280
- Return yards: 235
- Total touchdowns: 2
- Stats at Pro Football Reference

Nick Williams (born November 23, 1990) is an American former professional football player who was a wide receiver in the National Football League (NFL). He played college football for the Connecticut Huskies and was signed by the Washington Redskins as an undrafted free agent during the 2013 offseason.

== Professional career ==
Pre-draft measurables
Height	Weight	Arm length	Hand span	40-yard dash	10-yard split	20-yard split	20-yard shuttle	Three-cone drill	Vertical jump	Broad jump
5 ft 9 1/4 in (1.76 m)	184 lb (83 kg)	28 1/4 in (0.72 m)	8 5/8 in (0.22 m)	4.59 s	1.59 s	2.63 s	4.11 s	6.79 s	37.0 in (0.94 m)	9 ft 6 in (2.90 m)
All values from Pro Day

=== Washington Redskins ===
The Washington Redskins signed Williams as an undrafted free agent on April 28, 2013. He was released during final cuts, but signed to the practice squad a few days later. On November 8, Williams was promoted to the active roster in place of Chris Thompson. Williams made his NFL debut in Week 11 against the Philadelphia Eagles, recording a five-yard reception and scored a two-point conversion.

Williams was signed to the team's practice squad on August 31, 2014, after being waived the day before. He was waived again nine days later.

=== Atlanta Falcons ===
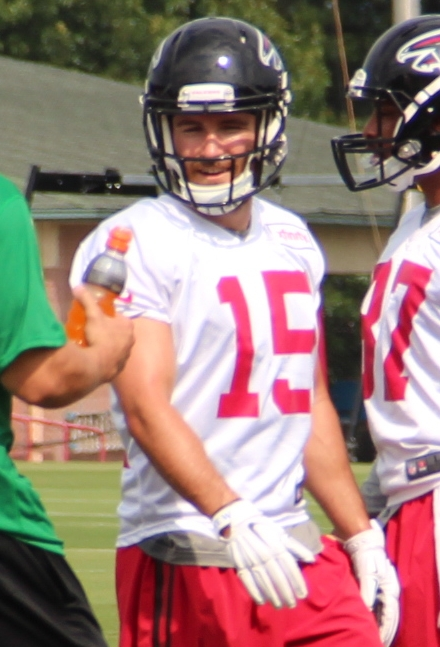
Williams in 2015

On February 24, 2015, Williams signed with the Atlanta Falcons. Williams played in 14 games with the Falcons in 2015, catching 17 passes for 159 yards and two touchdowns.

On September 4, 2016, Williams was released by the Falcons and was signed to the practice squad the next day. He was promoted to the active roster on December 9.

Williams was inactive for the Falcons' 34–28 overtime loss to the New England Patriots in the Super Bowl.

Williams only played in one game for the Falcons in 2017, recording three receptions for 30 yards in a Week 4 loss to the Buffalo Bills.

=== Tennessee Titans ===
On May 16, 2018, Williams signed with the Tennessee Titans. He was released on September 1. Williams was re-signed on September 18. Following a Week 5 game where he dropped a potential go-ahead touchdown from Marcus Mariota, Williams was released on October 9.

=== Los Angeles Rams ===
On October 16, 2018, Williams was signed by the Los Angeles Rams. He was released on November 30.

=== Denver Broncos ===
On July 26, 2019, Williams was signed by the Denver Broncos. He was released on August 26.

=== San Francisco 49ers ===
On August 27, 2019, Williams was signed by the San Francisco 49ers. He was placed on injured reserve four days later. Williams was released from injured reserve with an injury settlement on September 6.

== Personal life ==
Williams grew up in East Windsor, New Jersey and played high school football at the Hun School of Princeton.

Williams was a pre-kinesiology major while at the University of Connecticut.
