= Mark Popek =

American football player (born 1990)

No. 74
- Position: Offensive guard

Personal information
- Born: August 31, 1990 (age 36); Plant City, Florida, U.S.
- Listed height: 6 ft 7 in (2.01 m)
- Listed weight: 308 lb (140 kg)

Career information
- High school: Plant City (FL)
- College: South Florida
- NFL draft: 2013: undrafted

Career history
- New York Jets (2013)*
- * Offseason or practice squad member only

Awards and highlights
- Second-team All-Big East (2012)

Mark Popek (born August 31, 1990) is an American former football offensive guard. He was signed by the New York Jets as an undrafted free agent in 2013. He played college football at USF.

== Early life ==
He attended Plant City High School in Plant City, Florida. He was named 5A second-team all-state team.

== College career ==
Popek redshirted his freshman year in 2008. As a redshirt freshman, he was named to the All-Big East Freshman team after playing in twelve games, starting the Bulls' last five of six games. In 2010, he made four starts while playing in eight games for USF. Popek started all twelve contests at left tackle in 2011 and led the Big East conference in sacks allowed, giving up 1.3 a game. Prior to the start of the 2012 season, Popek was listed in the 2012 Outland Trophy Watch List. He went on to start nine games at both the guard and tackle positions but missed time due to an ankle injury. He was selected to the 2012 Second-team All-Big East team.

== Professional career ==
Pre-draft measurables
Height	Weight	40-yard dash	10-yard split	20-yard split	20-yard shuttle	Three-cone drill	Vertical jump	Broad jump	Bench press
6 ft 6 in (1.98 m)	308 lb (140 kg)	5.47 s	1.81 s	3.06 s	4.84 s	7.80 s	28 in (0.71 m)	8 ft 4 in (2.54 m)	26 reps
All values taken from USF's Pro Day.

Popek signed with the New York Jets as an undrafted free agent on April 29, 2013. He was released on July 23, 2013.
