= Martin Wallace (American football) =

American football player (born 1990)

No. 64, 73, 77, 63, 65
- Position: Offensive tackle

Personal information
- Born: April 22, 1990 (age 36); New York, New York, U.S.
- Listed height: 6 ft 6 in (1.98 m)
- Listed weight: 330 lb (150 kg)

Career information
- High school: Manhattan (NY) Beacon
- College: Temple
- NFL draft: 2013: undrafted

Career history
- Cleveland Browns (2013); Carolina Panthers (2014−2015)*; Tampa Bay Buccaneers (2015)*; Chicago Bears (2015–2016)*; Arizona Cardinals (2016)*; New York Jets (2016)*; New York Giants (2017)*; New Orleans Saints (2017)
- * Offseason or practice squad member only

Awards and highlights
- Second-team All-Big East (2012)

Career NFL statistics
- Games played: 1
- Stats at Pro Football Reference

Martin Gordon Wallace (born April 22, 1990) is an American former professional football player who was an offensive tackle in the National Football League (NFL). He played college football for the Temple Owls.

== Professional career ==
=== Cleveland Browns ===
On April 30, 2013, he signed with the Cleveland Browns as an undrafted free agent. Wallace made his NFL debut in the Browns season finale against the Pittsburgh Steelers on December 29, 2013 and played on special teams.

=== Carolina Panthers ===
On October 21, 2014, the Carolina Panthers signed Wallace to their practice squad. On January 13, 2015, he signed a reserve/future contract with the Panthers. On September 5, 2015, he was released by the Panthers.

=== Tampa Bay Buccaneers ===
On September 9, 2015, the Tampa Bay Buccaneers signed Wallace to their practice squad. On September 15, 2015, he was released by the Buccaneers. He returned to the practice squad on September 22, 2015. On October 6, 2015, Wallace was released by the Buccaneers. On October 20, 2015, he was re-re-signed to the practice squad. On October 27, 2015, he was released by the Buccaneers.

=== Chicago Bears ===
On November 11, 2015, Wallace was signed by the Bears to the practice squad. On January 5, 2016, Wallace signed a futures contract with the Chicago Bears. On August 28, 2016, Wallace was waived by the Bears.

=== Arizona Cardinals ===
On October 10, 2016, Wallace was signed to the Cardinals' practice squad. He was released by the Cardinals on October 25, 2016 and was re-signed the next day. He was released by the Cardinals on November 1, 2016.

=== New York Jets ===
On December 14, 2016, Wallace was signed to the Jets' practice squad.

=== New York Giants ===
On January 12, 2017, Wallace signed a reserve/future contract with the Giants. On May 15, 2017, he was waived by the Giants.

=== New Orleans Saints ===
On July 25, 2017, Wallace signed with the New Orleans Saints. On August 4, 2017, Wallace was waived/injured by the Saints and placed on injured reserve. He was released by the Saints on November 6, 2017.
