= Greg Walker (American football) =

American football player (born 1981)

No. 73
- Position: Offensive tackle

Personal information
- Born: October 1, 1981 (age 45); Wichita, Kansas, U.S.
- Listed height: 6 ft 5 in (1.96 m)
- Listed weight: 341 lb (155 kg)

Career information
- High school: Sumter (Sumter, South Carolina)
- College: Clemson (1999–2003)
- NFL draft: 2004: undrafted

Career history
- Detroit Lions (2004)*; New York Giants (2004)
- * Offseason or practice squad member only

Awards and highlights
- Second-team All-ACC (2003)
- Stats at Pro Football Reference

Gregory Walker (born October 1, 1981) is an American former professional football offensive tackle who played for the New York Giants of the National Football League (NFL). He played college football for the Clemson Tigers.

== Early life ==
Gregory Walker was born on October 1, 1981, in Wichita, Kansas. He attended Sumter High School in Sumter, South Carolina.

== College career ==
Walker enrolled at Clemson University to play college football for the Tigers. He redshirted the 1999 season and was a four-year letterman from 2000 to 2003. He earned Associated Press second-team All-Atlantic Coast Conference honors as a senior in 2003. Walker played in the 2004 Las Vegas All-American Classic.

== Professional career ==
After going undrafted in the 2004 NFL draft, Walker signed with the Detroit Lions on April 30, 2004. He participated in rookie minicamp in early May, and was then released on May 6, 2004.

Walker was signed by the New York Giants on June 2, 2004. He played in seven games for the Giants during the 2004 season in a backup role before being placed on injured reserve on December 28, 2004. He was released on August 29, 2005.
