= Elmer Wilkens =

American football player (1901–1967)

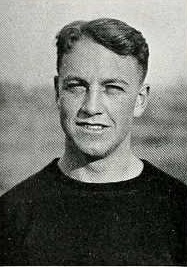

No. 18
- Positions: End, quarterback

Personal information
- Born: June 25, 1901. Fort Wayne, Indiana, U.S.
- Died: March 18, 1967 (aged 65); Fort Wayne, Indiana, U.S.
- Listed height: 5 ft 9 in (1.75 m)
- Listed weight: 175 lb (79 kg)

Career information
- High school: Fort Wayne (IN)
- College: Indiana (1920–1923)

Career history

Playing
- Green Bay Packers (1925)

Coaching
- Indiana freshmen (1924) Head coach

Career statistics
- Games played: 6 or 7 (Note: Pro-Football-Reference.com and Pro Football Archives conflict.)
- Stats at Pro Football Reference

Elmer Sutter Wilkens (June 25, 1901 – March 18, 1967) was an American football end and quarterback. He played college football for the Indiana Hoosiers from 1920 to 1923 and later coached their freshman team in 1924. Afterwards, he played with the Green Bay Packers of the National Football League (NFL) in 1925.

== Early life and education ==
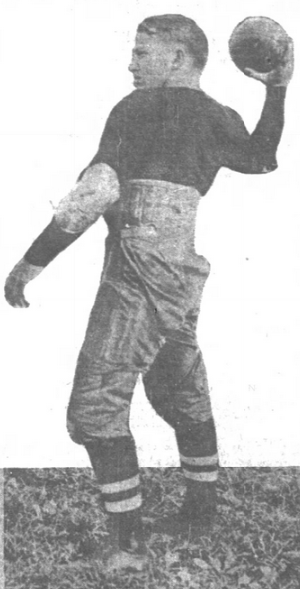
Wilkens throwing a pass, c. 1921

Wilkens was born on June 25, 1901, in Fort Wayne, Indiana. He attended Fort Wayne High School and became one of only three of their alumni ever to make it to the NFL. He also played basketball at Fort Wayne. In 1920, he enrolled at Indiana University Bloomington, playing for the freshman football squad that year and captaining it.

Wilkens earned a spot on the varsity football team in 1921 as a sophomore, earning his first letter. The team's starting quarterback from the prior season, Charlie Mathys, had graduated, and Wilkens was moved to fill in his spot. According to the Journal and Courier, many fans asked questions about the quarterback position for the 1921 season, and Wilkens "answered the query." He reportedly surprised even those who were critical of him during the year, and in November coach Ewald O. Stiehm said that "Wilkens has not made a single tactical blunder in any of the games thus far."

The Journal and Courier said of Wilkens that in addition to his quarterbacking skills, he "is a good open-field runner and a sure tackler. He lacks some of Mathys' experience in defensive play, but is improving right along in this respect." The Indianapolis News reported that he "runs the team nicely, runs well in the open, appears to be of solid judgement ... it is admitted that Sti[e]hm has chosen wisely and well." The 1921 Indiana Hoosiers finished with a record of 3–4.

Wilkens continued playing quarterback for Indiana in 1922, earning another letter as the team finished with a record of 1–4–2. As a senior in 1923, he played quarterback and as an end, being credited as one of the best receivers in the conference. He was one of only two seniors on the team.

In November, the Hoosiers played what was dedicated as the last game at their long-time stadium Jordan Field. University president William Lowe Bryan held a celebration and called for "the men of 1923 ... to win the last game at Jordan Field." In the game, against rival Purdue, Wilkens successfully attempted a 44-yard field goal through a drop kick, winning what would be his last college game 3–0. The length of his kick set a team record that would stand for 41 years.

Wilkens remained at Indiana in 1924 to complete his education, but did not play for the football team due to the rules stating that players could only have three years of eligibility for the varsity team. During this time, he served as the head coach of the freshman football team. According to the News-Record, he had "great success" as a coach and "turned out a great [freshman] team."

== Professional career ==
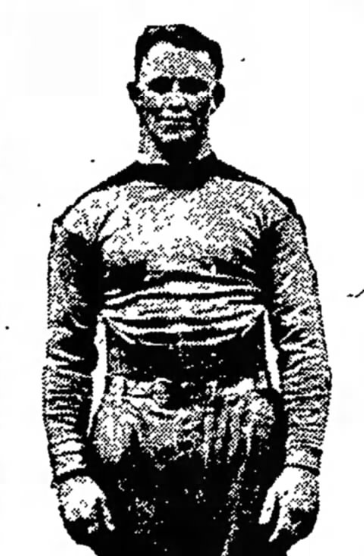
Wilkens with the Packers

In July 1925, Wilkens signed with the Green Bay Packers of the NFL to play end. He made his NFL debut in the Packers' 31–0 win over the Milwaukee Badgers on October 11. (Note: Wilkens did not appear in the first three games, against the Hammond Pros, Chicago Bears, and Rock Island Independents, first being mentioned in the game recap for the Badgers game.) He finished the season having played in between six and seven games, four of which he started, helping the Packers compile a record of 8–5. The Quad-City Times reported that his play with the team was "sensational." He wore number 18 with Green Bay, being the first player in team history with the number. Wilkens did not return to the team in 1926.

== Later life and death ==
Wilkens lived all of his life in Fort Wayne, Indiana. As of 1930, he worked at a bank as a bond salesman. He married Pearl Koegel in June 1933. He owned a business, the Wilkens Meat Market, in the early 1940s, prior to enlisting in the military for World War II in 1942. He was working as an inspector at a piston manufacturing plant by 1950. Wilkens died on March 18, 1967, at the age of 65.
