= Aaron Wallace Jr. =

American football player (born 1993)

Aaron Wallace
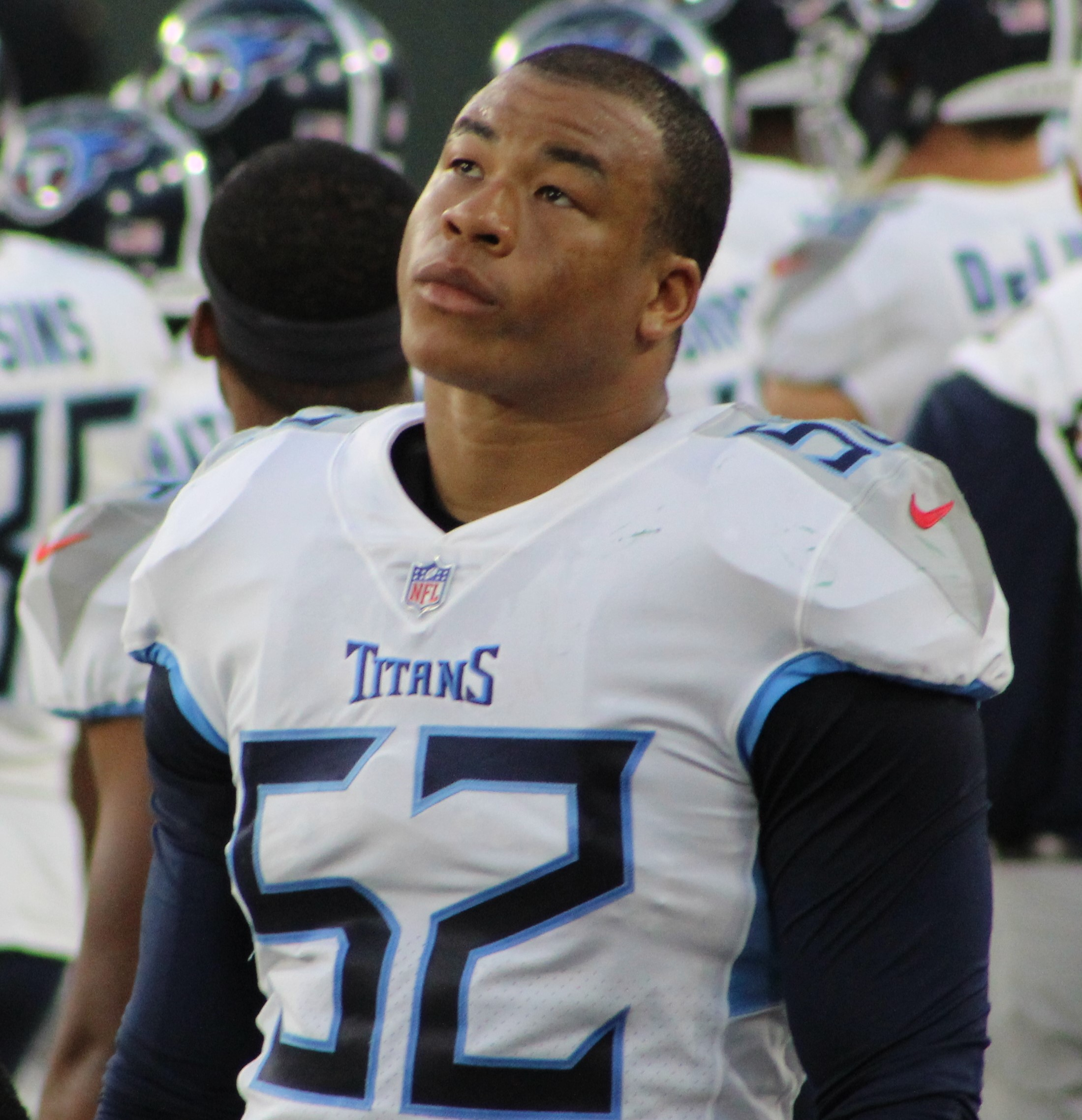
- Wallace with the Tennessee Titans in 2018

No. 52
- Position: Linebacker

Personal information
- Born: July 8, 1993 (age 33); Los Angeles, California, U.S.
- Listed height: 6 ft 3 in (1.91 m)
- Listed weight: 240 lb (109 kg)

Career information
- High school: Rancho Bernardo (San Diego, California)
- College: UCLA
- NFL draft: 2016: 7th round, 222nd overall pick

Career history
- Tennessee Titans (2016–2018); Cincinnati Bengals (2018)*; Denver Broncos (2018)
- * Offseason or practice squad member only

Career NFL statistics
- Total tackles: 15
- Sacks: 1
- Stats at Pro Football Reference

Aaron Jon Wallace Jr. (born July 8, 1993) is an American former professional football player who was a linebacker in the National Football League (NFL). He played high school football at Rancho Bernardo High School and college football for the UCLA Bruins. His father Aaron Wallace also played in the NFL.

== Professional career ==
External videos
- Wallace gets drafted by Tennessee

Pre-draft measurables
Height	Weight	40-yard dash	20-yard shuttle	Vertical jump	Broad jump	Bench press
6 ft 3 in (1.91 m)	242 lb (110 kg)	4.44 s	4.09 s	36 in (0.91 m)	10 ft 10 in (3.30 m)	25 reps
All values from UCLA's Pro Day

=== Tennessee Titans ===
Wallace was selected by the Tennessee Titans in the seventh round (222nd overall) of the 2016 NFL draft. On May 9, 2016, he signed a four-year contract with the Titans. During the 2016 season, Wallace appeared in 10 games, tallying 15 tackles and one sack. On September 20, 2017, Wallace was placed on injured reserve with a back injury. On September 18, 2018, Wallace was waived by the Titans.

=== Cincinnati Bengals ===
On November 20, 2018, Wallace was signed to the practice squad of the Cincinnati Bengals.

=== Denver Broncos ===
On December 28, 2018, Wallace was signed by the Denver Broncos off the Bengals' practice squad. On August 21, 2019, Wallace was waived/injured by the Broncos and placed on injured reserve. He was released on August 28.
