= Fred Washington (offensive tackle) =

American football player (1944–1985)

No. 75
- Position: Offensive tackle

Personal information
- Born: June 14, 1944 (age 82); Marlin, Texas
- Died: 1985

Career information
- College: North Texas

Career history
- 1968: Washington Redskins
- Stats at Pro Football Reference

Fred Earl Washington Sr. (June 14, 1944 – 1985) was an American football offensive tackle in the National Football League for the Washington Redskins. He played college football at the University of North Texas. His son Fred Washington Jr., a defensive tackle at Texas Christian University, was drafted by the Chicago Bears in the second round of the 1990 NFL draft, but was killed in a car accident during his rookie season.
