= Eric Watts =

American football player (born 2000)

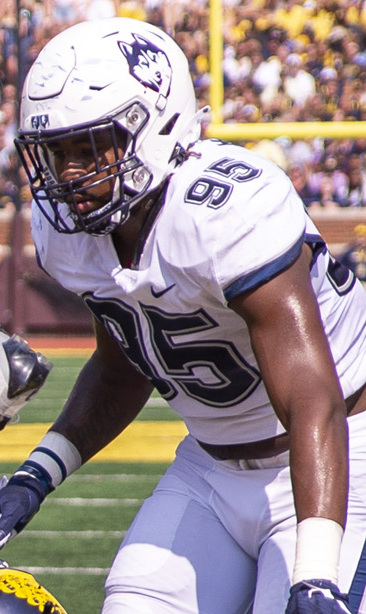
- Watts with UConn in 2022

No. 95 – Miami Dolphins
- Position: Defensive end
- Roster status: Active

Personal information
- Born: October 1, 2000 (age 26); Sumter, South Carolina, U.S.
- Listed height: 6 ft 5 in (1.96 m)
- Listed weight: 277 lb (126 kg)

Career information
- High school: Sumter
- College: UConn (2019–2023)
- NFL draft: 2024: undrafted

Career history
- New York Jets (2024–2025); Miami Dolphins (2026–present)

Career NFL statistics as of 2025
- Total tackles: 23
- Stats at Pro Football Reference

Eric Watts (born October 1, 2000) is an American professional football defensive end for the Miami Dolphins of the National Football League (NFL). He played college football for the UConn Huskies.

== Early life ==
From Sumter, South Carolina, Watts attended Sumter High School where he played football and basketball, being selected to the Offense–Defense All-American Bowl in football while helping the team win county and region championships. As a senior, he had 8 1/2 sacks while helping Sumter win ten straight games. He committed to play college football for the UConn Huskies.

== College career ==
Watts began seeing extended action at UConn as a true freshman in 2019. He appeared in all 12 games that year and totaled 30 tackles. The team's 2020 season was canceled due to the COVID-19 pandemic, and in 2021, Watts played 10 games while accumulating 39 tackles. He appeared in 13 games in the 2022 season and posted 49 tackles while leading the team in both tackles-for-loss (10) and sacks (7.0), additionally blocking two kicks and having two forced fumbles. He had 34 tackles and two sacks as a senior in 2023 and was invited to participate at the 2024 Senior Bowl and the NFL Scouting Combine.

== Professional career ==
Pre-draft measurables
Height	Weight	Arm length	Hand span	Wingspan	40-yard dash	10-yard split	20-yard split	20-yard shuttle	Three-cone drill	Vertical jump	Broad jump	Bench press
6 ft 5 5/8 in (1.97 m)	274 lb (124 kg)	35 3/4 in (0.91 m)	9 3/4 in (0.25 m)	7 ft 0 3/8 in (2.14 m)	4.67 s	1.65 s	2.73 s	4.38 s	7.48 s	36.5 in (0.93 m)	9 ft 9 in (2.97 m)	21 reps
All values from NFL Combine/Pro Day

=== New York Jets ===
Watts signed with the New York Jets as an undrafted free agent on May 3, 2024. Watts made the Jets' 2024 53 man roster out of training camp.

On August 26, 2025, Watts was waived by the Jets as part of final roster cuts and re-signed to the practice squad the next day. On December 10, he was signed to the active roster.

Watts was waived with an injury settlement by the Jets on August 14, 2026.

=== Miami Dolphins ===
On October 6, 2026, Watts signed with the Miami Dolphins practice squad. On November 17, he was signed to the active roster.
