= Kevin Williams (wide receiver, born 1971) =

American football player (born 1971)

No. 85, 82
- Position: Wide receiver

Personal information
- Born: January 25, 1971 (age 55); Dallas, Texas, U.S.
- Listed height: 5 ft 9 in (1.75 m)
- Listed weight: 195 lb (88 kg)

Career information
- High school: Franklin D. Roosevelt (Dallas)
- College: Miami (FL)
- NFL draft: 1993: 2nd round, 46th overall pick

Career history
- Dallas Cowboys (1993–1996); Arizona Cardinals (1997); Buffalo Bills (1998–1999); San Francisco 49ers (2000)

Awards and highlights
- 2× Super Bowl champion (XXVIII, XXX); NFL kickoff return yards leader (1997); First-team All-American (1991); Big East special teams player of the year (1991); All-Big East (1991); Second-team All-Big East (1992)

Career NFL statistics
- Receptions: 178
- Receiving yards: 2,314
- Receiving touchdowns: 7
- Stats at Pro Football Reference

Kevin Ray Williams, Jr. (born January 25, 1971) is an American former professional football player who was a wide receiver in the National Football League (NFL) for the Dallas Cowboys, Arizona Cardinals, Buffalo Bills and San Francisco 49ers. He played college football for the Miami Hurricanes, earning first-team All-American honors in 1991.

== Early life ==
Williams attended Franklin D. Roosevelt High School (Dallas), where he averaged 17.1 yards every time he touched the ball. As a senior in 1988, he split time between running back and wide receiver, tallying 100 carries for 995 yards, 10 rushing touchdowns, 36 receptions for 757 yards, 3 punt returns for touchdown and 2 kickoff returns for touchdown.

He finished his high school career with 111 receptions for 1,997 yards (17.9-yard average), 117 carries for 1,339 rushing yards (11.4-yard average), 21 receiving touchdowns, 14 rushing touchdowns and 10 return touchdowns. He averaged 25.6 yards per kickoff returns and 33.2 yards per punt return.

== College career ==
Williams accepted a football scholarship from the University of Miami, where he was the fastest player (4.28 seconds in the 40 yards) in some of college football most talented teams. As a redshirt freshman in 1990, he was the team's kickoff and punt returner. He registered 10 kickoff returns for 231 yards (23.1-yard average), 13 punt returns for 177 yards (13.6-yard average) and 4 receptions for 64 yards.

As a sophomore, he had a breakout season, posting 1,183 all-purpose yards, 36 punt returns for 560 yards (15.6-yard average) and 3 touchdowns, 10 kickoff returns for 185 yards (18.5-yard average), 21 receptions for 330 yards and 3 touchdowns. He had 3 consecutive games with punt returns for touchdowns, setting a school record and one shy of the NCAA record. Against Penn State University, he totaled 217 return yards (152 yards in punt returns) on seven attempts, including a 91-yard punt return for a touchdown (school record).

He was named the Big East special teams player of the year and received first-team All-American and All-Big East honors. He was a part of the Hurricane's 1991 National Championship team.

As a junior, he struggled with ankle and knee injuries, including the fact that several opponents chose not to kick to him. He recorded 29 punt returns for 302 yards (10.4-yard average), 4 kickoff returns for 82 yards (20.5-yard average), 40 receptions (fourth on the team) for 457 yards, 2 receiving touchdowns and a 68-yard pass completion for a touchdown. He declared for the NFL draft after the season.

== Professional career ==
Pre-draft measurables
Height	Weight	Arm length	Hand span	40-yard dash	10-yard split	20-yard split	20-yard shuttle	Vertical jump
5 ft 9 in (1.75 m)	190 lb (86 kg)	31 1/2 in (0.80 m)	9 in (0.23 m)	4.49 s	1.57 s	2.60 s	4.61 s	35.5 in (0.90 m)

=== Dallas Cowboys ===
In the 1993 NFL draft, the Dallas Cowboys traded their first-round draft choice (#29-George Teague) and fourth-round pick (#112-Al Fontenot) to the Green Bay Packers in exchange for two second-round picks (#46 and #54-Darrin Smith) and a fourth-round draft choice (#94-Derrick Lassic). The Cowboys selected Williams with their first choice in the second round.

As a rookie, he had a 10.5-yard punt return average (third in the NFC) and a 22.2-yard kickoff return average (sixth in the NFC). His best moment came in the infamous Leon Lett Thanksgiving game against the Miami Dolphins, where he scored all of the team's points (except the conversions) on a 4-yard reception and a 64-yard punt return.

In 1994, his 26.7-yard kickoff return average ranked fourth in the NFL and was the third highest single-season average in club history. He ranked sixth in the NFC with an 8.9-yard punt return average. He became the first player in franchise history to score a touchdown on a punt and a kickoff return in the same season. He set a team record for combined kickoff and punt return yardage (1,497), breaking Mel Renfro's 1964 mark of 1,435 yards. He also became the all-time team leader in combined touchdowns scored on kickoff and punt returns with 4. He was the first player in team history to score off a kickoff and a punt return in the same season. Also the first player to score career touchdowns on punt returns, kickoff, receiving and rushing.

In 1995, he received the opportunity as the starting wide receiver opposite to Michael Irvin after the departure of Alvin Harper, but never became the consistent big play complement that was expected from him. He had 38 receptions for 613 yards, 2 touchdowns and ranked sixth in the NFC with a 22.6-yard kickoff return average. Against the Arizona Cardinals, he set a club record with 307 combined net yards and had the sixth best single-game receiving total in franchise history at the time, with 203 yards, adding two touchdown receptions of 25 and 48 yards. Against the San Francisco 49ers, he became the team's record holder for career kickoff return yards and combined kickoff/punt return yards. He set the franchise single-season record for kickoff returns with 49.

In 1996, he was limited to only 10 games with a broken foot suffered in a 10-7 loss against the Buffalo Bills. He finished with 27 receptions for 323 yards and one touchdown. In 1997, he decided to leave the team via free agency, after Anthony Miller was signed to take over the second receiver role.

Williams speed and return abilities were always valued during his time with the Cowboys, setting the franchise career records for number of kickoff returns (144), number of combined returns (239) and kickoff return yards (3,4616) in just four seasons.

=== Arizona Cardinals ===
On July 15, 1997, he signed a one-year contract as a free agent with the Arizona Cardinals, where he played special teams and was a backup wide receiver. His 59 kickoff returns for 1,458 yards set a team single-season record and he also set a team record against the Atlanta Falcons with 207 kickoff return yards in a game.

His biggest offensive contribution came in week 15 versus the New Orleans Saints, where he racked 4 catches for 54 yards. He tied for fourth on the team with 20 receptions for 273 yards and one touchdown.

=== Buffalo Bills ===
On February 13, 1998, he signed as a free agent with the Buffalo Bills. He was third on the team with 29 receptions for 392 yards and one touchdown, while also being the team's kickoff and punt returner.

In 1999, he tied for fourth on the team with 31 receptions for 381 yards, while also being the team's kickoff and punt returner. He was released on April 14, 2000.

=== San Francisco 49ers ===
On July 18, 2000, he was signed by the San Francisco 49ers to be the punt and kickoff returner. He wasn't re-signed after the season. He finished his career with 178 receptions for 2,314 yards and 7 touchdowns, 167 rushing yards and 2 touchdowns, 7,309 kickoff return yards with 1 touchdown and 2,295 yards and 3 touchdowns on punt returns. He gained a total of 12,085 all purpose yards.

== NFL career statistics ==
Legend
	Won the Super Bowl
	Led the league
**Bold**	Career high

=== Regular season ===
Receiving Stats

Year	Team	GP	GS	Rec	Yds	Avg	Lng	TD	FD	Fum	Lost
1993	DAL	16	1	20	151	7.6	33	**2**	6	0	0
1994	DAL	15	2	13	181	13.9	29	0	7	0	0
1995	DAL	16	16	**38**	**613**	**16.1**	48	**2**	**32**	0	0
1996	DAL	10	9	27	323	12.0	31	1	20	0	0
1997	ARI	16	0	20	273	13.7	31	1	15	0	0
1998	BUF	16	0	29	392	13.5	**55**	1	18	**1**	**1**
1999	BUF	16	0	31	381	12.3	35	0	20	0	0
Career		121	28	178	2,314	13.0	55	7	118	1	1

=== Postseason ===
Year	Team	GP	GS	Rec	Yds	Avg	Lng	TD	FD	Fum	Lost
1993	DAL	3	0	0	0	—	0	0	0	0	0
1994	DAL	2	0	6	78	13.0	22	0	5	**1**	**1**
1995	DAL	3	3	**11**	**185**	**16.8**	**37**	0	**8**	0	0
1996	DAL	2	2	6	89	14.8	23	0	6	0	0
1998	BUF	1	0	2	20	10.0	15	0	1	0	0
1999	BUF	1	1	0	0	—	0	0	0	0	0
Career		12	6	25	372	14.9	37	0	20	1	1

=== Return Stats ===
Year	Team	GP	PR	Yds	TD	FC	Lng	KR	Yds	TD	FC	Lng
1993	DAL	16	36	381	**2**	14	64	31	689	0	0	49
1994	DAL	15	39	349	1	13	**83**	43	1,148	**1**	0	**87**
1995	DAL	16	18	166	0	15	30	49	1,108	0	0	43
1996	DAL	10	2	17	0	0	9	21	471	0	0	39
1997	ARI	16	**40**	**462**	0	15	50	**59**	**1,458**	0	0	63
1998	BUF	16	37	369	0	11	73	47	1,059	0	0	46
1999	BUF	16	33	331	0	**17**	27	42	840	0	0	62
2000	SF	16	26	220	0	13	25	30	536	0	0	33
Career		121	231	2,295	3	98	83	322	7,309	1	0	87
