= Fred Washington (defensive tackle) =

American football player (1967–1990)

No. 91
- Position: Defensive tackle

Personal information
- Born: July 11, 1967; Denison, Texas, U.S.
- Died: December 21, 1990 (aged 23); Lake Forest, Illinois, U.S.
- Listed height: 6 ft 2 in (1.88 m)
- Listed weight: 277 lb (126 kg)

Career information
- High school: Denison
- College: TCU
- NFL draft: 1990: 2nd round, 32nd overall pick

Career history
- Chicago Bears (1990)

Career NFL statistics
- Games played: 11
- Stats at Pro Football Reference

Fred Earl Washington (July 11, 1967 – December 21, 1990) was an American professional football player who was a defensive tackle for one season with the Chicago Bears of the National Football League (NFL). He played college football for the TCU Horned Frogs before being selected by the Bears in the second round of the 1990 NFL draft. He was killed in a car accident during his rookie season. He was a member of the 1984 Texas 4A State Football Champion Denison YellowJackets and was voted defensive player of the year.

== See also ==
- List of gridiron football players who died during their careers
