= 2023 Green Bay Packers season =

105th season in franchise history

- Owner: Green Bay Packers, Inc.
- General manager: Brian Gutekunst
- Head coach: Matt LaFleur
- Offensive coordinator: Adam Stenavich
- Defensive coordinator: Joe Barry
- Home stadium: Lambeau Field

Results
- Record: 9–8
- Division place: 2nd NFC North
- Playoffs: Won Wild Card Playoffs (at Cowboys) 48–32; Lost Divisional Playoffs (at 49ers) 21–24
- All-Pros: KR Keisean Nixon (1st team)
- Pro Bowlers: DE Kenny Clark

Uniform
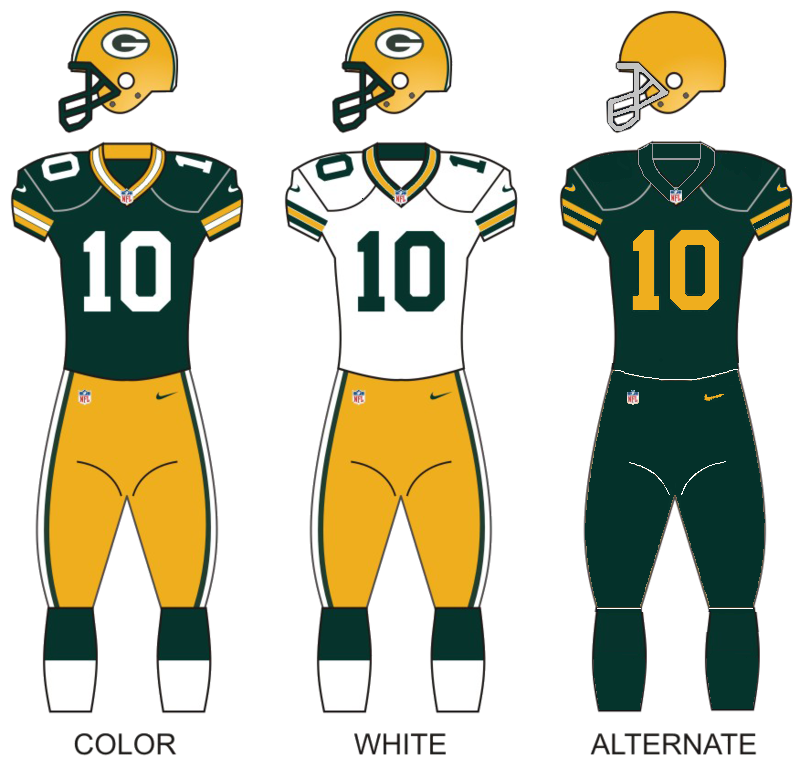

The 2023 season was the Green Bay Packers' 103rd in the National Football League (NFL), their 105th overall, their sixth under the leadership of general manager Brian Gutekunst and their fifth under head coach Matt LaFleur.

For the first time since 2004, quarterback Aaron Rodgers was not on the roster, as he was traded to the New York Jets on April 26. Rodgers, who had been the starter since 2008, won four NFL MVPs, led the team to five NFC Championship appearances (they lost four of them), and won Super Bowl XLV. This was the first season with Jordan Love as the starting quarterback, who was picked in the first round of the 2020 NFL draft. Also, for the first time since 2006, longtime kicker Mason Crosby was not on the roster as he was not re-signed in the offseason.

Despite struggling in the first half of the season with a 3–6 record, the Packers would go 6–2 in their final eight games, improving on their 8–9 record from the previous season and clinching the final NFC playoff berth, winning a three-way conference record and strength of victory tiebreaker with the New Orleans Saints and Seattle Seahawks for the No. 7 seed, becoming the youngest team to make the playoffs since the NFL expanded to 16 games in 1978, tying the record previously set by the 1980 Atlanta Falcons and the 1987 Houston Oilers, who both made the playoffs with an average team member age of 25.2 years old.

In the Wild Card round, the Packers became the first seventh-seeded playoff team to win a playoff game when they defeated the second-seeded Dallas Cowboys 48–32, giving the Packers their first playoff win without Brett Favre or Aaron Rodgers since 1982. They eventually lost to the eventual NFC champion San Francisco 49ers 24–21 in the Divisional round, marking the fifth time in 11 years that the 49ers ended the Packers postseason run.

The Packers drew an average home attendance of 77,829 in 8 home games in the 2023 NFL season, the fourth-highest in the league.

== Player movements ==
=== Trades ===
Date	Player incoming	Player outgoing
April 26	To Green Bay Packers; 2023 first-round pick 2023 second-round pick 2023 sixth-round pick conditional 2024 second-round pick (2024 first-round pick if Rodgers played 65% of the offensive snaps in 2023)	To New York Jets; Aaron Rodgers; 2023 first-round pick 2023 fifth-round pick
October 31	To Green Bay Packers; 2024 third-round pick (91)	To Buffalo Bills; Rasul Douglas; 2024 fifth-round pick

=== Free agents ===
Position	Player	Free agency tag	Date signed	2023 team
FS	Adrian Amos	UFA	June 13	New York Jets
CB	Corey Ballentine	UFA	March 20	Green Bay Packers
ILB	Krys Barnes	UFA	March 25	Arizona Cardinals
WR	Randall Cobb	UFA	May 3	New York Jets
K	Mason Crosby	UFA	December 22	New York Giants
TE	Tyler Davis	RFA	March 15	Green Bay Packers
FS	Rudy Ford	UFA	March 20	Green Bay Packers
OLB	Justin Hollins	UFA	March 23	Green Bay Packers
WR	Allen Lazard	UFA	March 17	New York Jets
SS	Dallin Leavitt	UFA	April 4	Green Bay Packers
TE	Marcedes Lewis	UFA	August 4	Chicago Bears
DE	Dean Lowry	UFA	March 20	Minnesota Vikings
OT	Yosh Nijman	RFA	April 17	Green Bay Packers
CB	Keisean Nixon	UFA	March 15	Green Bay Packers
DE	Jarran Reed	UFA	March 16	Seattle Seahawks
TE	Robert Tonyan	UFA	March 17	Chicago Bears
ILB	Eric Wilson	UFA	March 25	Green Bay Packers

=== Re-signings ===
Position	Player	Date
QB	Jordan Love	May 3
LB	Rashan Gary	October 30

=== Additions ===
Position	Player	Former team	Date
S	Tarvarius Moore	San Francisco 49ers	March 17
LS	Matt Orzech	Los Angeles Rams	March 17
LS	Broughton Hatcher	Old Dominion Monarchs	May 8
CB	William Hooper	Northwestern State Demons	May 8
DE	Antonio Moultrie	Miami Hurricanes	May 8
S	Jonathan Owens	Houston Texans	May 12
P	Daniel Whelan	DC Defenders	May 17
C	DJ Scaife	Miami Dolphins	May 17
RB	Emanuel Wilson	Fort Valley State Wildcats	May 22
WR	Jadakis Bonds	Hampton Pirates	May 23
QB	Alex McGough	Birmingham Stallions	July 19
WR	Cody Chrest	Sam Houston Bearkats	July 26
C	James Empey	Tennessee Titans	July 31
WR	Andre Miller	New York Giants	August 1
C	Cole Schneider	Birmingham Stallions	August 1
LB	Arron Mosby	Carolina Panthers	August 3
RB	Nate McCrary	Cleveland Browns	August 7
LB	Marvin Pierre	Arizona Cardinals	August 21
CB	Elijah Hamilton	Miami Dolphins	August 22
LS	Matt Orzech	Green Bay Packers	August 31
S	Zayne Anderson	Buffalo Bills	August 31
TE	Ben Sims	Minnesota Vikings	August 31
RB	Patrick Taylor	Green Bay Packers	October 9
LB	Justin Hollins	Green Bay Packers	October 10
LB	Corey Ballentine	Green Bay Packers	October 25
LB	Robert Rochell	Carolina Panthers	October 25
LB	Innis Gaines	Green Bay Packers	November 11
CB	Kyu Blu Kelly	Seattle Seahawks	November 15
RB	Patrick Taylor	Green Bay Packers	November 20
WR	Bo Melton	Green Bay Packers	November 22
RB	James Robinson	Green Bay Packers	November 22
CB	David Long	Carolina Panthers	December 5
CB	Benny Sapp III	Green Bay Packers	December 30
WR	Bo Melton	Green Bay Packers	January 1
K	Jack Podlesny	Minnesota Vikings	January 24

=== Subtractions ===
Position	Player	2023 team	Release date
LS	Jack Coco	Arizona Cardinals	May 8
S	James Wiggins	New Orleans Breakers	May 15
CB	Benjie Franklin	Seattle Seahawks	May 17
K	Parker White		May 22
TE	Nick Guggemos	Buffalo Bills	May 23
C	DJ Scaife	Houston Texans	July 19
WR	Jeff Cotton	BC Lions	July 26
LB	Jonathan Garvin		July 28
TE	Camren McDonald	Los Angeles Rams	August 1
G	Chuck Filiaga	New Orleans Saints	August 1
OLB	La'Darius Hamilton	San Francisco 49ers	August 1
QB	Danny Etling	Michigan Panthers	August 6
C	Jake Hanson	New York Jets	August 22
P	Pat O'Donnell	Atlanta Falcons	August 28
RB	Tyler Goodson	Indianapolis Colts	August 29
LS	Broughton Hatcher		August 29
RB	Lew Nichols III	Philadelphia Eagles	August 29
ILB	Tariq Carpenter	Pittsburgh Steelers	August 30
NT	Jonathan Ford	Green Bay Packers	August 30
RB	Patrick Taylor	New England Patriots	October 10
LB	Justin Hollins	New York Giants	October 21
S	Innis Gaines		November 13
S	Dallin Leavitt	Denver Broncos	November 20
WR	Bo Melton	Green Bay Packers	November 27
RB	James Robinson	Green Bay Packers	November 27
CB	Kyu Blu Kelly	Washington Commanders	December 12
CB	David Long		January 6

=== Draft ===
2023 Green Bay Packers draft selections
Round	Selection	Player	Position	College	Notes
1	13	Lukas Van Ness	Defensive end	Iowa	From Jets (Note: The Packers traded first- and fifth-round selections (15th and 170th overall), and QB Aaron Rodgers to the New York Jets in exchange for first-, second- and sixth-round selections (13th, 42nd and 207th overall), and a conditional 2024 second-round selection (that would have become a first-round selection if Rodgers had played in 65% of the snaps in 2023).)
1	15	Traded to the New York Jets			
2	42	Luke Musgrave	Tight end	Oregon State	From Browns via Jets
2	45	Traded to the Detroit Lions (Note: The Packers traded a second-round selection (45th overall) to the Detroit Lions in exchange for second- and fifth-round selections (48th and 159th overall).)			
2	48	Traded to the Tampa Bay Buccaneers (Note: The Packers traded a second-round selection (48th overall) to the Tampa Bay Buccaneers in exchange for second- and sixth-round selections (50th and 179th overall).)			
2	50	Jayden Reed	Wide receiver	Michigan State	From Buccaneers
3	78	Tucker Kraft	Tight end	South Dakota State	
4	116	Colby Wooden	Defensive end	Auburn	
5	149	Sean Clifford	Quarterback	Penn State	
5	159	Dontayvion Wicks	Wide receiver	Virginia	From Jaguars via Falcons and Lions
5	170	Traded to the New York Jets			
6	179	Karl Brooks	Defensive end	Bowling Green	From Texans via Buccaneers
6	191	Traded to the Los Angeles Rams (Note: The Packers traded a sixth-round selection (191st overall) to the Los Angeles Rams in exchange for a seventh-round selection (235th overall) and P Corey Bojorquez.)			
6	207	Anders Carlson	Kicker	Auburn	From 49ers via Texans and Jets
7	232	Carrington Valentine	Cornerback	Kentucky	
7	235	Lew Nichols III	Running back	Central Michigan	From Rams
7	242	Anthony Johnson Jr.	Safety	Iowa State	From Jaguars (Note: The Packers traded G Cole Van Lanen to the Jacksonville Jaguars in exchange for a seventh-round selection (242nd overall).)
7	256	Grant DuBose	Wide receiver	Charlotte	Compensatory pick

Draft trades

=== Undrafted free agent additions ===
The Packers announced the signing of twelve undrafted free agents on May 1, 2023.

2023 Green Bay Packers undrafted free agents
Name	Position	College
OLB	Keshawn Banks	San Diego State
OLB	Brenton Cox Jr.	Florida
G	Chuck Filiaga	Minnesota
WR	Malik Heath	Ole Miss
DE	Jason Lewan	Illinois State
TE	Camren McDonald	Florida State
FS	Christian Morgan	Baylor
FB	Henry Pearson	Appalachian State
ILB	Jimmy Phillips Jr.	SMU
SS	Benny Sapp III	Northern Iowa
OT	Kadeem Telfort	UAB
WR	Duece Watts	Tulane

=== Roster cuts ===
The roster was cut to 53 on August 29, 2022.

Position	Player	2023 team
TE	Austin Allen	
CB	Corey Ballentine	Green Bay Packers
OLB	Keshawn Banks	Green Bay Packers
WR	Jadakis Bonds	
WR	Cody Chrest	
OT	Jean Delance	
WR	Grant DuBose	Green Bay Packers
CB	Tyrell Ford	
FS	Innis Gaines	Green Bay Packers
CB	Elijah Hamilton	St. Louis Battlehawks
CB	William Hooper	
CB	Shemar Jean-Charles	San Francisco 49ers
NT	Jason Lewan	
RB	Nate McCrary	Cleveland Browns
QB	Alex McGough	Green Bay Packers
WR	Bo Melton	Green Bay Packers
WR	Dre Miller	
LB	Arron Mosby	Green Bay Packers
DE	Antonio Moultrie	
LB	Kenneth Odumegwu	
LS	Matt Orzech	Green Bay Packers
FB	Henry Pearson	
LB	Jimmy Phillips Jr.	
LB	Marvin Pierre	
S	Benny Sapp III	Green Bay Packers
C	Cole Schneider	Birmingham Stallions
DE	Chris Slayton	Green Bay Packers
RB	Patrick Taylor	Green Bay Packers
OT	Kadeem Telfort	
CB	Kiondre Thomas	Green Bay Packers
WR	Duece Watts	Pittsburgh Steelers

== Staff ==
2023 Green Bay Packers staff
Front office: Owner: Publicly held corporation; Executive committee – Board of directors; President/CEO – Mark Murphy; General manager – Brian Gutekunst; Executive vice president/director of football operations – Russ Ball; Vice president of player personnel – Jon-Eric Sullivan; Director of player personnel – John Wojciechowski; Director of football operations – Milt Hendrickson; Director of college scouting – Matt Malaspina; Assistant director of college scouting – Patrick Moore; Director of pro personnel – Richmond Williams; Director of football administration – Melaine Marohl; National scout – Sam Seale; Director of performance psychology/team behavioral health clinician – Chris Carr; Director of player engagement – Grey Ruegamer; Player personnel executive – Lee Gissendaner; Head coaches: Head coach – Matt LaFleur; Assistant head coach/special teams coordinator – Rich Bisaccia; Offensive coaches: Offensive coordinator – Adam Stenavich; Quarterbacks – Tom Clements; Assistant quarterbacks – Connor Lewis; Running backs – Ben Sirmans; Wide receivers/passing game coordinator – Jason Vrable; Tight ends – John Dunn; Offensive line – Luke Butkus; Assistant offensive line – Ryan Mahaffey; Offensive quality control – Ramsen Golpashin; Offensive quality control – Rob Grosso; Coaching assistant – Quinshon Odom	Defensive coaches: Defensive coordinator – Joe Barry; Defensive line/running game coordinator – Jerry Montgomery; Pass rush specialist – Jason Rebrovich; Inside linebackers – Kirk Olivadotti; Passing game coordinator – Greg Williams; Defensive backs – Ryan Downard; Defensive quality control – Wendel Davis; Defensive quality control – Justin Hood; Senior analyst – Tim Lester; Special teams coaches: Assistant special teams – Byron Storer; Special teams quality control – Kyle Wilber; Strength and conditioning: Strength and conditioning coordinator – Chris Gizzi; Strength and conditioning assistant – Thadeus Jackson; Strength and conditioning assistant – Mark Lovat; Strength and conditioning assistant – Grant Thorne

== Final roster ==
2023 Green Bay Packers roster
Quarterbacks (QB): 8 Sean Clifford; 10 Jordan Love; Running backs (RB): 28 A. J. Dillon; 33 Aaron Jones; 27 Patrick Taylor; 31 Emanuel Wilson; Wide receivers (WR): 87 Romeo Doubs; 18 Malik Heath; 80 Bo Melton; 11 Jayden Reed; 9 Christian Watson; 13 Dontayvion Wicks; Tight ends (TE): 81 Josiah Deguara; 85 Tucker Kraft; 88 Luke Musgrave; 89 Ben Sims	Offensive linemen (OL): 74 Elgton Jenkins G; 72 Caleb Jones T; 71 Josh Myers C; 70 Royce Newman G; 73 Yosh Nijman T; 75 Sean Rhyan G; 76 Jon Runyan Jr. G; 50 Zach Tom T; 63 Rasheed Walker T; Defensive linemen (DL): 94 Karl Brooks DE; 97 Kenny Clark DE; 93 Tedarrell Slaton NT; 96 Colby Wooden DE; 95 Devonte Wyatt DE	Linebackers (LB): 59 De'Vondre Campbell ILB; 57 Brenton Cox Jr. OLB; 55 Kingsley Enagbare OLB; 52 Rashan Gary OLB; 58 Isaiah McDuffie ILB; 91 Preston Smith OLB; 90 Lukas Van Ness OLB; 7 Quay Walker ILB; 54 Kristian Welch ILB; 45 Eric Wilson ILB; Defensive backs (DB): 23 Jaire Alexander CB; 39 Zayne Anderson FS; 35 Corey Ballentine CB; 36 Anthony Johnson Jr. FS; 25 Keisean Nixon CB; 34 Jonathan Owens SS; 22 Robert Rochell CB; 48 Benny Sapp III SS; 26 Darnell Savage SS/FS; 37 Carrington Valentine CB; Special teams (ST): 17 Anders Carlson K; 42 Matthew Orzech LS; 19 Daniel Whelan P	Practice squad: 51 Keshawn Banks OLB; 24 Tyler Coyle SS; 86 Grant DuBose WR; 99 Jonathan Ford NT; 29 Zyon Gilbert CB; 40 Anthony Johnson CB; 30 David Long CB; 2 Alex McGough QB; 38 Ellis Merriweather RB; 53 Arron Mosby OLB; 16 Pat O'Donnell P; 56 Kenneth Odumegwu OLB (IPP); 44 Henry Pearson FB; 16 Thyrick Pitts WR; 98 Chris Slayton DE; 77 Kadeem Telfort T; 82 Joel Wilson TE; Reserve: 69 David Bakhtiari T (IR); 84 Tyler Davis TE (IR); 20 Rudy Ford FS (IR); 21 Eric Stokes CB (IR); 78 Luke Tenuta T (IR); 83 Samori Toure WR (IR); Rookies in italics 53 active, 6 reserve, 16 practice squad (1 exempt)

== Preseason ==
The Packers' preseason opponents and schedule was announced on May 11.

Week	Date	Opponent	Result	Record	Venue	Recap
1	August 11	at Cincinnati Bengals	W 36–19	1–0	Paycor Stadium	Recap
2	August 19 (Note: Due to an injury involving Isaiah Bolden, the game was suspended with around ten minutes to go in the fourth quarter.)	New England Patriots	L 17–21	1–1	Lambeau Field	Recap
3	August 26	Seattle Seahawks	W 19–15	2–1	Lambeau Field	Recap

== Regular season ==
The schedule was announced on May 11.

=== Schedule ===
Week	Date	Opponent	Result	Record	Venue	Recap
1	September 10	at **Chicago Bears**	**W** 38–20	1–0	Soldier Field	Recap
2	September 17	at Atlanta Falcons	**L** 24–25	1–1	Mercedes-Benz Stadium	Recap
3	September 24	New Orleans Saints	**W** 18–17	2–1	Lambeau Field	Recap
4	September 28	**Detroit Lions**	**L** 20–34	2–2	Lambeau Field	Recap
5	October 9	at Las Vegas Raiders	**L** 13–17	2–3	Allegiant Stadium	Recap
6	Bye					
7	October 22	at Denver Broncos	**L** 17–19	2–4	Empower Field at Mile High	Recap
8	October 29	**Minnesota Vikings**	**L** 10–24	2–5	Lambeau Field	Recap
9	November 5	Los Angeles Rams	**W** 20–3	3–5	Lambeau Field	Recap
10	November 12	at Pittsburgh Steelers	**L** 19–23	3–6	Acrisure Stadium	Recap
11	November 19	Los Angeles Chargers	**W** 23–20	4–6	Lambeau Field	Recap
12	November 23	at **Detroit Lions**	**W** 29–22	5–6	Ford Field	Recap
13	December 3	Kansas City Chiefs	**W** 27–19	6–6	Lambeau Field	Recap
14	December 11	at New York Giants	**L** 22–24	6–7	MetLife Stadium	Recap
15	December 17	Tampa Bay Buccaneers	**L** 20–34	6–8	Lambeau Field	Recap
16	December 24	at Carolina Panthers	**W** 33–30	7–8	Bank of America Stadium	Recap
17	December 31	at **Minnesota Vikings**	**W** 33–10	8–8	U.S. Bank Stadium	Recap
18	January 7, 2024	**Chicago Bears**	**W** 17–9	9–8	Lambeau Field	Recap

Note: Intra-division opponents are in bold text.

=== Game summaries ===
==== Week 1: at Chicago Bears ====
Week 1: Green Bay Packers at Chicago Bears – Game summary

Quarter	1	2	3	4	Total
**Packers**	7	3	14	14	**38**
Bears	3	3	8	6	**20**

at Soldier Field, Chicago, Illinois

- Date: September 10
- Game time: 3:25 p.m. CDT
- Game weather: Mostly sunny, 75 °F (24 °C)
- Game attendance: 62,456
- Referee: Craig Wrolstad
- TV announcers (Fox): Kevin Burkhardt, Greg Olsen, Erin Andrews and Tom Rinaldi
- Recap, Game Book

Game information

**First quarter**

- GB – Romeo Doubs 8-yard pass from Jordan Love (Anders Carlson kick), 6:08. Packers 7–0. **Drive: 11 plays, 40 yards, 5:23.**
- CHI – Cairo Santos 47-yard field goal, 2:04. Packers 7–3. **Drive: 7 plays, 38 yards, 4:04.**

**Second quarter**

- CHI – Cairo Santos 29-yard field goal, 9:00. Packers 7–6. **Drive: 12 plays, 52 yards, 6:32.**
- GB – Anders Carlson 52-yard field goal, 0:00. Packers 10–6. **Drive: 6 plays, 22 yards, 1:12.**

**Third quarter**

- GB – Aaron Jones 1-yard run (Anders Carlson kick), 10:19. Packers 17–6. **Drive: 8 plays, 75 yards, 4:41.**
- GB – Aaron Jones 35-yard pass from Jordan Love (Anders Carlson kick), 6:26. Packers 24–6. **Drive: 4 plays, 42 yards, 1:39.**
- CHI – Darnell Mooney 20-yard pass from Justin Fields (Khalil Herbert run), 0:59. Packers 24–14. **Drive: 6 plays, 65 yards, 2:23.**

**Fourth quarter**

- GB – Romeo Doubs 4-yard pass from Jordan Love (Anders Carlson kick), 13:30. Packers 31–14. **Drive: 5 plays, 61 yards, 2:29.**
- GB – Quay Walker 37-yard interception return (Anders Carlson kick), 12:36. Packers 38–14.
- CHI – Roschon Johnson 2-yard run (pass failed), 2:54. Packers 38–20. **Drive: 14 plays, 69 yards, 3:24.**

**Top passers**

- GB – Jordan Love – 15/27, 245 yards, 3 TD
- CHI – Justin Fields – 24/37, 216 yards, TD, INT

**Top rushers**

- GB – Aaron Jones – 9 rushes, 41 yards, 2 TD
- CHI – Justin Fields – 9 rushes, 59 yards

**Top receivers**

- GB – Aaron Jones – 2 receptions, 86 yards, TD
- CHI – Darnell Mooney – 4 receptions, 53 yards, TD

==== Week 2: at Atlanta Falcons ====
Week 2: Green Bay Packers at Atlanta Falcons – Game summary

Quarter	1	2	3	4	Total
Packers	0	10	14	0	**24**
**Falcons**	3	6	3	13	**25**

at Mercedes-Benz Stadium, Atlanta, Georgia

- Date: September 17
- Game time: 1:00 p.m. EDT/12:00 p.m. CDT
- Game weather: None (retractable roof closed)
- Game attendance: 69,251
- Referee: Tra Blake
- TV announcers (Fox): Kenny Albert, Jonathan Vilma and Shannon Spake
- Recap, Game Book

Game information

**First quarter**

- ATL – Younghoe Koo 24-yard field goal, 3:50. Falcons 3–0. **Drive: 15 plays, 67 yards, 6:43.**

**Second quarter**

- GB – Jayden Reed 9-yard pass from Jordan Love (Anders Carlson kick), 13:33. Packers 7–3. **Drive: 11 plays, 84 yards, 5:17.**
- GB – Anders Carlson 33-yard field goal, 3:06. Packers 10–3. **Drive: 10 plays, 44 yards, 5:45.**
- ATL – Drake London 3-yard pass from Desmond Ridder (kick missed), 0:12. Packers 10–9. **Drive: 11 plays, 75 yards, 2:54.**

**Third quarter**

- GB – Dontayvion Wicks 32-yard pass from Jordan Love (Anders Carlson kick), 10:31. Packers 17–9. **Drive: 6 plays, 65 yards, 3:58.**
- ATL – Younghoe Koo 33-yard field goal, 3:07. Falcons 17–12. **Drive: 13 plays, 60 yards, 7:24.**
- GB – Jayden Reed 10-yard pass from Jordan Love (Anders Carlson kick), 0:56. Packers 24–12. **Drive: 4 plays, 78 yards, 2:11.**

**Fourth quarter**

- ATL – Desmond Ridder 6-yard run (Younghoe Koo kick), 11:48. Packers 24–19. **Drive: 8 play, 75 yards, 4:08.**
- ATL – Younghoe Koo 39-yard field goal, 8:10. Packers 24–22. **Drive: 8 plays, 44 yards, 2:41.**
- ATL – Younghoe Koo 25-yard field goal, :57. Falcons 25–24. **Drive: 12 plays, 66 yards, 5:10.**

**Top passers**

- GB – Jordan Love – 14/25, 151 yards, 3 TD
- ATL – Desmond Ridder – 19/32, 237 yards, TD, INT

**Top rushers**

- GB – A. J. Dillon – 15 rushes, 55 yards
- ATL – Bijan Robinson – 19 rushes, 124 yards

**Top receivers**

- GB – Jayden Reed – 8 receptions, 37 yards, 2 TD
- ATL – Drake London – 7 receptions, 67 yards, TD

==== Week 3: vs. New Orleans Saints ====
Week 3: New Orleans Saints at Green Bay Packers – Game summary

Quarter	1	2	3	4	Total
Saints	7	10	0	0	**17**
**Packers**	0	0	0	18	**18**

at Lambeau Field, Green Bay, Wisconsin

- Date: September 24
- Game time: 12:00 p.m. CDT
- Game weather: Cloudy, 68 °F (20 °C)
- Game attendance: 78,043
- Referee: Brad Rogers
- TV announcers (Fox): Kenny Albert, Jonathan Vilma and Shannon Spake
- Recap, Game Book

Game information

**First quarter**

- NO – Jimmy Graham 8-yard pass from Derek Carr (Blake Grupe kick), 6:40. Saints 7–0. **Drive: 9 plays, 56 yards, 4:04.**

**Second quarter**

- NO – Rashid Shaheed 76-punt return (Blake Grupe kick), 10:30. Saints 14–0.
- NO – Blake Grupe 25-yard field goal, 0:06. Saints 17–0. **Drive: 14 plays, 82 yards, 4:24.**

**Third quarter** No scoring plays. **Fourth quarter**

- GB – Anders Carlson 38-yard field goal, 11:00. Saints 17–3. **Drive: 7 plays, 46 yards, 1:50.**
- GB – Jordan Love 1-yard run (Samori Toure pass from Jordan Love), 6:58. Saints 17–11. **Drive: 7 plays, 80 yards, 1:29.**
- GB – Romeo Doubs 8-yard pass from Jordan Love (Anders Carlson kick), 2:56. Packers 18–17. **Drive: 9 plays, 80 yards, 2:27.**

**Top passers**

- NO – Derek Carr – 13/18, 103 yards, TD
- GB – Jordan Love – 22/44, 259 yards, TD, INT

**Top rushers**

- NO – Kendre Miller – 9 rushes, 34 yards
- GB – Jordan Love – 9 rushes, 39 yards, TD

**Top receivers**

- NO – Chris Olave – 8 receptions, 104 yards
- GB – Luke Musgrave – 6 receptions, 49 yards

==== Week 4: vs. Detroit Lions ====
Week 4: Detroit Lions at Green Bay Packers – Game summary

Quarter	1	2	3	4	Total
**Lions**	14	13	0	7	**34**
Packers	3	0	8	9	**20**

at Lambeau Field, Green Bay, Wisconsin

- Date: September 28
- Game time: 7:15 p.m. CDT
- Game weather: Cloudy, 64 °F (18 °C)
- Game attendance: 78,052
- Referee: Alan Eck
- TV announcers (WGBA/WITI/Prime Video): Al Michaels, Kirk Herbstreit and Kaylee Hartung
- Recap, Game Book

Game information

**First quarter**

- GB – Anders Carlson 34-yard field goal, 11:59. Packers 3–0. **Drive: 4 plays, 0 yards, 1:35.**
- DET – Amon-Ra St. Brown 24-yard pass from Jared Goff (Riley Patterson kick), 8:16. Lions 7–3. **Drive: 7 plays, 75 yards, 3:43.**
- DET – David Montgomery 3-yard run (Riley Patterson kick), 2:54. Lions 14–3. **Drive: 8 plays, 55 yards, 4:16.**

**Second quarter**

- DET – Riley Patterson 33-yard field goal, 14:07. Lions 17–3. **Drive: 6 plays, 61 yards, 2:13.**
- DET – David Montgomery 2-yard run (Riley Patterson kick), 13:19. Lions 24–3. **Drive: 2 plays, 7 yards, 0:32.**
- DET – Riley Patterson 37-yard field goal, 0:34. Lions 27–3. **Drive: 12 plays, 57 yards, 5:00.**

**Third quarter**

- GB – Christian Watson 1-yard pass from Jordan Love (Jordan Love–Jayden Reed pass), 8:17. Lions 27–11. **Drive: 12 plays, 86 yards, 6:43.**

**Fourth quarter**

- GB – Jordan Love 9-yard run (run failed), 14:52. Lions 27–17. **Drive: 5 plays, 66 yards, 1:02.**
- DET – David Montgomery 1-yard run, 6:00. Lions 34–17. **Drive: 15 plays, 75 yards, 8:52.**
- GB – Anders Carlson 50-yard field goal, 2:52. Lions 34–20. **Drive: 4 plays, 3 yards, 0:40.**

**Top passers**

- DET – Jared Goff – 19/28, 210 yards, TD, INT
- GB – Jordan Love – 23/36, 246 yards, TD, 2 INT

**Top rushers**

- DET – David Montgomery – 32 rushes, 121 yards, 3 TD
- GB – Aaron Jones – 5 rushes, 18 yards

**Top receivers**

- DET – Josh Reynolds – 3 receptions, 69 yards
- GB – Romeo Doubs – 9 receptions, 95 yards

==== Week 5: at Las Vegas Raiders ====
Week 5: Green Bay Packers at Las Vegas Raiders – Game summary

Quarter	1	2	3	4	Total
Packers	3	0	10	0	**13**
**Raiders**	0	10	0	7	**17**

at Allegiant Stadium, Paradise, Nevada

- Date: October 9
- Game time: 7:15 p.m. CDT/5:15 p.m. PDT
- Game weather: None (indoor stadium)
- Game attendance: 62,572
- Referee: Brad Allen
- TV announcers (ESPN/ABC): Joe Buck, Troy Aikman and Lisa Salters
- Recap, Game Book

Game information

**First quarter**

- GB – Anders Carlson 37-yard field goal, 2:38. Packers 3–0. **Drive: 8 plays, 75 yards, 3:52.**

**Second quarter**

- LV – Jakobi Meyers 9-yard pass from Jimmy Garoppolo (Daniel Carlson kick), 4:09. Raiders 7–3. **Drive: 14 plays, 62 yards, 8:28.**
- LV – Daniel Carlson 26-yard field goal, 2:32. Raiders 10–3. **Drive: 4 plays, −1 yards, 1:28.**

**Third quarter**

- GB – A. J. Dillon 5-yard run (Anders Carlson kick), 8:27. Tied 10–10. **Drive: 8 plays, 37 yards, 4:22.**
- GB – Anders Carlson 22-yard field goal, 5:16. Packers 13–10. **Drive: 5 plays, 79 yards, 1:59.**

**Fourth quarter**

- LV – Josh Jacobs 1-yard run (Daniel Carlson kick), 14:56. Raiders 17–13. **Drive: 10 plays, 75 yards, 5:20.**

**Top passers**

- GB – Jordan Love – 16/30, 182 yards, 3 INT
- LV – Jimmy Garoppolo – 22/31, 208 yards, TD, INT

**Top rushers**

- GB – A. J. Dillon – 20 rushes, 76 yards, TD
- LV – Josh Jacobs – 20 rushes, 69 yards, TD

**Top receivers**

- GB – Christian Watson – 3 receptions, 91 yards
- LV – Jakobi Meyers – 7 receptions, 75 yards, TD

The Packers ended their eight-game winning streak against the Raiders and lost to them for the first time since the 1987 season.

==== Week 7: at Denver Broncos ====
Week 7: Green Bay Packers at Denver Broncos – Game summary

Quarter	1	2	3	4	Total
Packers	0	0	10	7	**17**
**Broncos**	3	6	7	3	**19**

at Empower Field at Mile High, Denver, Colorado

- Date: October 22
- Game time: 3:25 p.m. CDT/2:25 p.m. MDT
- Game weather: Sunny, 72 °F (22 °C)
- Game attendance: 76,880
- Referee: Alex Kemp
- TV announcers (CBS): Kevin Harlan, Trent Green and Melanie Collins
- Recap, Game Book

Game information

**First quarter**

- DEN – Wil Lutz 32-yard field goal, 8:27. Broncos 3–0. **Drive: 11 plays, 62 yards, 6:33.**

**Second quarter**

- DEN – Wil Lutz 29-yard field goal, 13:14. Broncos 6–0. **Drive: 11 plays, 70 yards, 4:17.**
- DEN – Wil Lutz 35-yard field goal, 0:05. Broncos 9–0. **Drive: 6 plays, 50 yards, 0:36.**

**Third quarter**

- GB – Anders Carlson 29-yard field goal, 10:24. Broncos 9–3. **Drive: 12 plays, 64 yards, 4:36.**
- DEN – Courtland Sutton 18-yard pass from Russell Wilson (Wil Lutz kick), 6:17. Broncos 16–3. **Drive: 7 plays, 75 yards, 4:07.**
- GB – Romeo Doubs 16-yard pass from Jordan Love (Anders Carlson kick), 1:46. Broncos 16–10. **Drive: 9 plays, 75 yards, 4:31.**

**Fourth quarter**

- GB – Jayden Reed 4-yard pass from Jordan Love (Anders Carlson kick), 8:31. Packers 17–16. **Drive: 11 plays, 76 yards, 6:19.**
- DEN – Wil Lutz 52-yard field goal, 3:50. Broncos 19–17. **Drive: 9 plays, 41 yards, 4:41.**

**Top passers**

- GB – Jordan Love – 21/31, 180 yards, 2 TD, INT
- DEN – Russell Wilson – 20/29, 194 yards, TD

**Top rushers**

- GB – A. J. Dillon – 15 rushes, 61 yards
- DEN – Javonte Williams – 15 rushes, 82 yards

**Top receivers**

- GB – Luke Musgrave – 4 receptions, 30 yards
- DEN – Courtland Sutton – 6 receptions, 76 yards, TD

The Packers trailed the game 9–0 and 16–3, but took a 17–16 lead in the fourth quarter. However, the Packers lost 19–17 after Jordan Love threw an interception to drop to 2–4, the first time since the 2006 season.

This was the first time the Packers offense has scored 20 points or fewer in four straight games since the 2005 season (that streak would last for six straight games).

The Packers have been outscored in their last four first halves, 63–6. And they have been held to three points, or fewer, in the first half of four straight games for the first time since the 1988 season (that streak would also last for six straight games).

==== Week 8: vs. Minnesota Vikings ====
Week 8: Minnesota Vikings at Green Bay Packers – Game summary

Quarter	1	2	3	4	Total
**Vikings**	7	3	14	0	**24**
Packers	0	3	7	0	**10**

at Lambeau Field, Green Bay, Wisconsin

- Date: October 29
- Game time: 12:00 p.m. CDT
- Game weather: Cloudy, 39 °F (4 °C)
- Game attendance: 78,113
- Referee: Shawn Hochuli
- TV announcers (Fox): Kenny Albert, Jonathan Vilma and Shannon Spake
- Recap, Game Book

Game information

**First quarter**

- MIN – Cam Akers 6-yard run (Greg Joseph kick), 1:34. Vikings 7–0. **Drive: 7 plays, 77 yards, 4:33.**

**Second quarter**

- MIN – Greg Joseph 25-yard field goal, 10:13. Vikings 10–0. **Drive: 9 plays, 73 yards, 4:40.**
- GB – Anders Carlson 30-yard field goal, 0:00. Vikings 10–3. **Drive: 14 plays, 73 yards, 4:56.**

**Third quarter**

- MIN – T. J. Hockenson 2-yard pass from Kirk Cousins (Greg Joseph kick), 9:25. Vikings 17–3. **Drive: 13 plays, 75 yards, 5:35.**
- MIN – Jordan Addison 20-yard pass from Kirk Cousins (Greg Joseph kick), 7:48. Vikings 24–3. **Drive: 1 plays, 20 yards, 0:05.**
- GB – Romeo Doubs 1-yard pass from Jordan Love (Anders Carlson kick), 2:39. Vikings 24–10. **Drive: 14 plays, 81 yards, 5:09.**

**Fourth quarter**

- No scoring plays.

**Top passers**

- MIN – Kirk Cousins – 23/31, 274 yards, 2 TD
- GB – Jordan Love – 24/41, 229 yards, TD, INT

**Top rushers**

- MIN – Alexander Mattison – 16 rushes, 31 yards
- GB – Jordan Love – 4 rushes, 34 yards

**Top receivers**

- MIN – K. J. Osborn – 8 receptions, 99 yards
- GB – A. J. Dillon – 5 receptions, 41 yards

==== Week 9: vs. Los Angeles Rams ====
Week 9: Los Angeles Rams at Green Bay Packers – Game summary

Quarter	1	2	3	4	Total
Rams	0	3	0	0	**3**
**Packers**	0	7	3	10	**20**

at Lambeau Field, Green Bay, Wisconsin

- Date: November 5
- Game time: 12:00 p.m. CST
- Game weather: Cloudy, 51 °F (11 °C)
- Game attendance: 77,409
- Referee: Clete Blakeman
- TV announcers (Fox): Adam Amin, Daryl Johnston and Pam Oliver
- Recap, Game Book

Game information

**First quarter**

- No scoring plays.

**Second quarter**

- GB – Aaron Jones 3-yard run (Anders Carlson kick), 14:19. Packers 7–0. **Drive: 7 plays, 41 yards, 4:05.**
- LAR – Lucas Havrisik 52-yard field goal, 1:42. Packers 7–3. **Drive: 13 plays, 56 yards, 5:46.**

**Third quarter**

- GB – Anders Carlson 26-yard field goal, 2:10. Packers 10–3. **Drive: 7 plays, 53 yards, 4:19.**

**Fourth quarter**

- GB – Anders Carlson 34-yard field goal, 9:08. Packers 13–3. **Drive: 7 plays, 34 yards, 4:15.**
- GB – Luke Musgrave 20-yard pass from Jordan Love (Anders Carlson kick), 3:41. Packers 20–3. **Drive: 8 plays, 72 yards, 4:45.**

**Top passers**

- LAR – Brett Rypien – 13/28, 130 yards, INT
- GB – Jordan Love – 20/26, 228 yards, TD

**Top rushers**

- LAR – Royce Freeman – 12 rushes, 32 yards
- GB – Aaron Jones – 20 rushes, 73 yards, TD

**Top receivers**

- LAR – Tutu Atwell – 4 receptions, 13 yards
- GB – Dontayvion Wicks – 4 receptions, 49 yards

==== Week 10: at Pittsburgh Steelers ====
Week 10: Green Bay Packers at Pittsburgh Steelers – Game summary

Quarter	1	2	3	4	Total
Packers	7	6	6	0	**19**
**Steelers**	7	10	3	3	**23**

at Acrisure Stadium, Pittsburgh, Pennsylvania

- Date: November 12
- Game time: 1:00 p.m. EST/12:00 p.m. CST
- Game weather: Partly cloudy, 50 °F (10 °C)
- Game attendance: 67,617
- Referee: Scott Novak
- TV announcers (CBS): Ian Eagle, Charles Davis and Evan Washburn
- Recap, Game Book

Game information

**First quarter**

- PIT – Najee Harris 4-yard run (Chris Boswell kick), 10:01. Steelers 7–0. **Drive: 9 plays, 75 yards, 4:59.**
- GB – Romeo Doubs 8 yard pass from Jordan Love (Anders Carlson kick), 4:42. Tied 7–7. **Drive: 10 plays, 69 yards, 5:19.**

**Second quarter**

- PIT – Jaylen Warren 16-yard run (Chris Boswell kick), 14:12. Steelers 14–7. **Drive: 11 plays, 60 yards, 5:30.**
- PIT – Chris Boswell 42-yard field goal, 8:08. Steelers 17–7. **Drive: 8 plays, 30 yards, 4:58.**
- GB – Jayden Reed 35-yard pass from Jordan Love (kick blocked), 4:14. Steelers 17–13. **Drive: 7 plays, 87 yards, 3:54.**

**Third quarter**

- GB – Anders Carlson 31-yard field goal, 9:08. Steelers 17–16. **Drive: 11 plays, 31 yards, 5:52.**
- GB – Anders Carlson 28-yard field goal, 3:04. Packers 19–17. **Drive: 9 plays, 68 yards, 4:06.**
- PIT – Chris Boswell 49-yard field goal, 1:05. Steelers 20–19. **Drive: 5 plays, 35 yards, 1:59.**

**Fourth quarter**

- PIT – Chris Boswell 35-yard field goal, 5:14. Steelers 23–19. **Drive: 8 plays, 49 yards, 4:10.**

**Top passers**

- GB – Jordan Love – 21/40, 289 yards, 2 TD, 2 INT
- PIT – Kenny Pickett – 14/23, 126 yards

**Top rushers**

- GB – A. J. Dillon – 9 rushes, 70 yards
- PIT – Jaylen Warren – 15 rushes, 101 yards

**Top receivers**

- GB – Jayden Reed – 5 receptions, 84 yards, TD
- PIT – George Pickens – 3 receptions, 45 yards

==== Week 11: vs. Los Angeles Chargers ====
Week 11: Los Angeles Chargers at Green Bay Packers – Game summary

Quarter	1	2	3	4	Total
Chargers	3	7	3	7	**20**
**Packers**	0	10	6	7	**23**

at Lambeau Field, Green Bay, Wisconsin

- Date: November 19
- Game time: 12:00 p.m. CST
- Game weather: Sunny, 45 °F (7 °C)
- Game attendance: 77,432
- Referee: John Hussey
- TV announcers (Fox): Kevin Kugler, Mark Sanchez and Laura Okmin
- Recap, Game Book

Game information

**First quarter**

- LAC – Cameron Dicker 25-yard field goal, 1:22. Chargers 3–0. **Drive: 12 plays, 79 yards, 6:38.**

**Second quarter**

- GB – Jayden Reed 32-yard run (Anders Carlson kick), 14:53. Packers 7–3. **Drive: 6 plays, 69 yards, 1:29.**
- LAC – Stone Smartt 51-yard pass from Justin Herbert (Cameron Dicker kick), 12:16. Chargers 10–7. **Drive: 6 plays, 75 yards, 2:37.**
- GB – Anders Carlson 28-yard field goal, 0:07. Tied 10–10. **Drive: 16 plays, 71 yards, 5:44.**

**Third quarter**

- LAC – Cameron Dicker 26-yard field goal, 10:44. Chargers 13–10. **Drive: 10 plays, 71 yards, 4:16.**
- GB – Christian Watson 11-yard pass from Jordan Love (kick failed), 0:04. Packers 16–13. **Drive: 5 plays, 70 yards, 2:21.**

**Fourth quarter**

- LAC – Keenan Allen 10-yard pass from Justin Herbert (Cameron Dicker kick), 5:24. Chargers 20–16. **Drive: 11 plays, 63 yards, 5:36.**
- GB – Romeo Doubs 24-yard pass from Jordan Love (Anders Carlson kick), 2:33. Packers 23–20. **Drive: 6 plays, 75 yards, 2:51.**

**Top passers**

- LAC – Justin Herbert – 21/36, 260 yards, 2 TD
- GB – Jordan Love – 27/40, 322 yards, 2 TD

**Top rushers**

- LAC – Justin Herbert – 8 rushes, 73 yards
- GB – Jayden Reed – 3 rushes, 46 yards, TD

**Top receivers**

- LAC – Keenan Allen – 10 receptions, 116 yards, TD
- GB – Romeo Doubs – 5 receptions, 53 yards, TD

==== Week 12: at Detroit Lions ====
Thanksgiving Day games

Week 12: Green Bay Packers at Detroit Lions – Game summary

Quarter	1	2	3	4	Total
**Packers**	20	3	6	0	**29**
Lions	6	0	8	8	**22**

at Ford Field, Detroit, Michigan

- Date: November 23
- Game time: 12:30 p.m. EST/11:30 a.m. CST
- Game weather: None (indoor stadium)
- Game attendance: 66,476
- Referee: Carl Cheffers
- TV announcers (Fox): Kevin Burkhardt, Greg Olsen, Erin Andrews and Tom Rinaldi
- Recap, Game Book

Game information

**First quarter**

- GB – Jayden Reed 10-yard pass from Jordan Love (Anders Carlson kick), 12:16. Packers 7–0. **Drive: 5 plays, 75 yards, 2:44.**
- DET – Sam LaPorta 7-yard pass from Jared Goff (kick failed), 8:30. Packers 7–6. **Drive: 7 plays, 73 yards, 3:46.**
- GB – Tucker Kraft 9-yard pass from Jordan Love (Anders Carlson kick), 3:08. Packers 14–6. **Drive: 10 plays, 75 yards, 5:22.**
- GB – Jonathan Owens 27-yard fumble return (kick failed), 2:12. Packers 20–6.

**Second quarter**

- GB – Anders Carlson 43-yard field goal, 5:56. Packers 23–6. **Drive: 9 plays, 62 yards, 4:42.**

**Third quarter**

- DET – David Montgomery 6-yard run (David Montgomery run), 11:46. Packers 23–14. **Drive: 7 plays, 72 yards, 3:14.**
- GB – Christian Watson 16-yard pass from Jordan Love (pass failed), 3:30. Packers 29–14. **Drive: 3 plays, 23 yards, 1:57.**

**Fourth quarter**

- DET – Josh Reynolds 12-yard pass from Jared Goff (Sam LaPorta pass from Jared Goff), 0:41. Packers 29–22. **Drive: 12 plays, 91 yards, 2:05.**

**Top passers**

- GB – Jordan Love – 22/32, 268 yards, 3 TD
- DET – Jared Goff – 29/44, 332 yards, 2 TD

**Top rushers**

- GB – A. J. Dillon – 14 rushes, 43 yards
- DET – David Montgomery – 15 rushes, 71 yards, TD

**Top receivers**

- GB – Christian Watson – 5 receptions, 94 yards, TD
- DET – Amon-Ra St. Brown – 9 receptions, 95 yards

With the win, the Packers improved to 5–6. This was the first Packers victory against the Lions since Week 2 of the 2021 season. This was also the first Packers victory on Thanksgiving since the 2011 season, also against the Lions.

==== Week 13: vs. Kansas City Chiefs ====
Week 13: Kansas City Chiefs at Green Bay Packers – Game summary

Quarter	1	2	3	4	Total
Chiefs	3	3	6	7	**19**
**Packers**	7	7	7	6	**27**

at Lambeau Field, Green Bay, Wisconsin

- Date: December 3
- Game time: 7:20 p.m. CST
- Game weather: Cloudy, 31 °F (−1 °C)
- Game attendance: 78,124
- Referee: Brad Allen
- TV announcers (NBC): Mike Tirico, Cris Collinsworth and Melissa Stark
- Recap, Game Book

Game information

**First quarter**

- GB – Ben Sims 1-yard pass from Jordan Love (Anders Carlson kick), 7:13. Packers 7–0. **Drive: 13 plays, 75 yards, 7:47.**
- KC – Harrison Butker 34-yard field goal, 0:00. Packers 7–3. **Drive: 13 plays, 60 yards, 7:13.**

**Second quarter**

- GB – Christian Watson 9-yard pass from Jordan Love (Anders Carlson kick), 10:39. Packers 14–3. **Drive: 8 plays, 75 yards, 4:21.**
- KC – Harrison Butker 34-yard field goal, 2:19. Packers 14–6. **Drive: 14 plays, 59 yards, 8:20.**

**Third quarter**

- KC – Isiah Pacheco 1-yard run (run failed), 9:39. Packers 14–12. **Drive: 9 plays, 75 yards, 5:21.**
- GB – Christian Watson 12-yard pass from Jordan Love (Anders Carlson kick), 5:23. Packers 21–12. **Drive: 7 plays, 67 yards, 4:16.**

**Fourth quarter**

- KC – Noah Gray 2-yard pass from Patrick Mahomes (Harrison Butker kick), 14:51. Packers 21–19. **Drive: 11 plays, 66 yards, 5:32.**
- GB – Anders Carlson 40-yard field goal, 6:03. Packers 24–19. **Drive: 11 plays, 55 yards, 4:38.**
- GB – Anders Carlson 48-yard field goal, 1:09. Packers 27–19. **Drive: 11 plays, 35 yards, 4:05.**

**Top passers**

- KC – Patrick Mahomes – 21/33, 210 yards, TD, INT
- GB – Jordan Love – 25/36, 267 yards, 3 TD

**Top rushers**

- KC – Isiah Pacheco – 18 rushes, 110 yards, TD
- GB – A. J. Dillon – 18 rushes, 73 yards

**Top receivers**

- KC – Travis Kelce – 4 receptions, 81 yards
- GB – Romeo Doubs – 4 receptions, 72 yards

==== Week 14: at New York Giants ====
Week 14: Green Bay Packers at New York Giants – Game summary

Quarter	1	2	3	4	Total
Packers	7	3	3	9	**22**
**Giants**	0	7	14	3	**24**

at MetLife Stadium, East Rutherford, New Jersey

- Date: December 11
- Game time: 8:15 p.m. EST/7:15 p.m. CST
- Game weather: Overcast, 39 °F (4 °C)
- Game attendance: 76,637
- Referee: Land Clark
- TV announcers (ABC): Joe Buck, Troy Aikman and Lisa Salters
- Recap, Game Book

Game information

**First quarter**

- GB – Jayden Reed 16-yard run (Anders Carlson kick), 1:01. Packers 7–0. **Drive: 7 plays, 62 yards, 3:51.**

**Second quarter**

- NYG – Saquon Barkley 5-yard run (Randy Bullock kick), 11:55. Tied 7–7. **Drive: 8 plays, 75 yards, 4:06.**
- GB – Anders Carlson 36-yard field goal. Packers 10–7. **Drive: 10 plays, 65 yards, 2:32.**

**Third quarter**

- NYG – Saquon Barkley 1-yard run (Randy Bullock kick), 11:22. Giants 14–10. **Drive: 3 plays, 31 yards, 1:30.**
- GB – Anders Carlson 32-yard field goal, 7:31. Giants 14–13. **Drive: 4 plays, 0 yards, 1:34.**
- NYG – Isaiah Hodgins 8-yard pass from Tommy DeVito (Randy Bullock kick), 1:28. Giants 21–13. **Drive: 10 plays, 75 yards, 6:03.**

**Fourth quarter**

- GB – Anders Carlson 48-yard field goal, 5:30. Giants 21–16. **Drive: 7 plays, 54 yards, 3:29.**
- GB – Malik Heath 6-yard pass from Jordan Love (run failed), 1:33. Packers 22–21. **Drive: 9 plays, 36 yards, 2:01.**
- NYG – Randy Bullock 37-yard field goal, 0:00. Giants 24–22. **Drive: 8 plays, 57 yards, 1:33.**

**Top passers**

- GB – Jordan Love – 25/39, 218 yards, TD, INT
- NYG – Tommy DeVito – 17/21, 158 yards, TD

**Top rushers**

- GB – A. J. Dillon – 15 rushes, 53 yards
- NYG – Saquon Barkley – 20 rushes, 86 yards, 2 TD

**Top receivers**

- GB – Tucker Kraft – 4 receptions, 64 yards
- NYG – Wan'Dale Robinson – 6 receptions, 79 yards

==== Week 15: vs. Tampa Bay Buccaneers ====
Week 15: Tampa Bay Buccaneers at Green Bay Packers – Game summary

Quarter	1	2	3	4	Total
**Buccaneers**	3	10	14	7	**34**
Packers	7	3	7	3	**20**

at Lambeau Field, Green Bay, Wisconsin

- Date: December 17
- Game time: 12:00 p.m. CST
- Game weather: Cloudy, 42 °F (6 °C)
- Game attendance: 77,275
- Referee: Tra Blake
- TV announcers (CBS): Andrew Catalon, Tiki Barber, Matt Ryan and AJ Ross
- Recap, Game Book

Game information

**First quarter**

- TB – Chase McLaughlin 39-yard field goal, 9:02. Buccaneers 3–0. **Drive: 10 plays, 54 yards, 5:58.**
- GB – Tucker Kraft 5-yard pass from Jordan Love (Anders Carlson kick), 0:49. Packers 7–3. **Drive: 2 plays, 4 yards, 0:52.**

**Second quarter**

- TB – Mike Evans 19-yard pass from Baker Mayfield (Chase McLaughlin kick), 12:21. Buccaneers 10–7. **Drive: 7 plays, 75 yards, 3:28.**
- GB – Anders Carlson 36-yard field goal, 7:09. Tied 10–10. **Drive: 8 plays, 57 yards, 5:12.**
- TB – Chase McLaughlin 46-yard field goal, 0:10. Buccaneers 13–10. **Drive: 9 plays, 61 yards, 2:03.**

**Third quarter**

- TB – Rachaad White 26-yard pass from Baker Mayfield (Chase McLaughlin kick), 10:55. Buccaneers 20–10. **Drive: 8 plays, 66 yards, 3:26.**
- GB – Jayden Reed 17-yard pass from Jordan Love (Anders Carlson kick), 4:18. Buccaneers 20–17. **Drive: 11 plays, 75 yards, 6:37.**
- TB – Ko Kieft 2-yard pass from Baker Mayfield (Chase McLaughlin kick), 0:20. Buccaneers 27–17. **Drive: 9 plays, 75 yards, 3:58.**

**Fourth quarter**

- GB – Anders Carlson 33-yard field goal, 10:04. Buccaneers 27–20. **Drive: 10 plays, 60 yards, 5:16.**
- TB – David Moore 52-yard pass from Baker Mayfield (Chase McLaughlin kick), 6:30. Buccaneers 34–20. **Drive: 6 plays, 75 yards, 3:34.**

**Top passers**

- TB – Baker Mayfield – 22/28, 381 yards, 4 TD
- GB – Jordan Love – 29/39, 284 yards, 2 TD

**Top rushers**

- TB – Rachaad White – 21 rushes, 89 yards
- GB – Aaron Jones – 20 rushes, 86 yards

**Top receivers**

- TB – Chris Godwin – 10 receptions, 155 yards
- GB – Dontayvion Wicks – 6 receptions, 97 yards

==== Week 16: at Carolina Panthers ====
Week 16: Green Bay Packers at Carolina Panthers – Game summary

Quarter	1	2	3	4	Total
**Packers**	7	16	0	10	**33**
Panthers	3	7	6	14	**30**

at Bank of America Stadium, Charlotte, North Carolina

- Date: December 24
- Game time: 1:00 p.m. EST/12:00 p.m. CST
- Game weather: Sunny, 67 °F (19 °C)
- Game attendance: 70,875
- Referee: Alex Kemp
- TV announcers (Fox): Chris Myers, Robert Smith and Jen Hale
- Recap, Game Book

Game information

**First quarter**

- GB – A. J. Dillon 1-yard run (Anders Carlson kick), 7:30. Packers 7–0. **Drive: 7 plays, 80 yards, 3:58.**
- CAR – Eddy Piñeiro 52-yard field goal, 5:24. Packers 7–3. **Drive: 6 plays, 35 yards, 2:06.**

**Second quarter**

- GB – Jordan Love 1-yard run (kick failed), 14:57. Packers 13–3. **Drive: 10 plays, 79 yards, 5:27.**
- CAR – Ihmir Smith-Marsette 20-yard run (Eddy Piñeiro kick), 10:29. Packers 13–10. **Drive: 8 plays, 77 yards, 4:28.**
- GB – Anders Carlson 53-yard field goal, 7:51. Packers 16–10. **Drive: 7 plays, 40 yards, 2:38.**
- GB – Dontayvion Wicks 21-yard pass from Jordan Love (Anders Carlson kick), 0:49. Packers 23–10. **Drive: 11 plays, 60 yards, 3:23.**

**Third quarter**

- CAR – Chuba Hubbard 4-yard run (kick failed), 5:11. Packers 23–16. **Drive: 14 plays, 72 yards, 8:20.**

**Fourth quarter**

- GB – Romeo Doubs 5-yard pass from Jordan Love (Anders Carlson kick), 14:57. Packers 30–16. **Drive: 9 plays, 66 yards, 5:14.**
- CAR – D. J. Chark 11-yard pass from Bryce Young (kick failed), 7:14. Packers 30–22. **Drive: 9 plays, 60 yards, 4:24.**
- CAR – D. J. Chark 10-yard pass from Bryce Young (Raheem Blackshear run), 4:05. Tied 30–30. **Drive: 5 plays, 70 yards, 1:42.**
- GB – Anders Carlson 32-yard field goal, 0:19. Packers 33–30. **Drive: 9 plays, 61 yards, 3:46.**

**Top passers**

- GB – Jordan Love – 17/28, 219 yards, 2 TD
- CAR – Bryce Young – 23/36, 312 yards, 2 TD

**Top rushers**

- GB – Aaron Jones – 21 rushes, 127 yards
- CAR – Chuba Hubbard – 16 rushes, 43 yards, TD

**Top receivers**

- GB – Romeo Doubs – 4 receptions, 79 yards, TD
- CAR – D. J. Chark – 6 receptions, 98 yards, 2 TD

Jordan Love threw for 219 yards, 2 touchdowns, and led a drive that set up an Anders Carlson field goal with 19 seconds left. However, the Packers defense struggled again as they allowed the Carolina Panthers to erase a 14-point deficit to tie the game at 30–30, along with Bryce Young throwing for 312 yards and 2 touchdowns, as well as allowing the Panthers to march 44 yards in 19 seconds before failing to spike the ball in time for the game-tying field goal, sealing the win for the Packers.

==== Week 17: at Minnesota Vikings ====
Week 17: Green Bay Packers at Minnesota Vikings – Game summary

Quarter	1	2	3	4	Total
**Packers**	10	13	7	3	**33**
Vikings	0	3	0	7	**10**

at U.S. Bank Stadium, Minneapolis, Minnesota

- Date: December 31
- Game time: 7:20 p.m. CST
- Game weather: None (indoor stadium)
- Game attendance: 67,003
- Referee: Clay Martin
- TV announcers (NBC): Mike Tirico, Cris Collinsworth and Melissa Stark
- Recap, Game Book

Game information

**First quarter**

- GB – Anders Carlson 34-yard field goal, 6:43. Packers 3–0. **Drive: 12 plays, 64 yards, 5:53.**
- GB – Jayden Reed 33-yard pass from Jordan Love (Anders Carlson kick), 5:10. Packers 10–0. **Drive: 2 plays, 33 yards, 0:48.**

**Second quarter**

- MIN – Greg Joseph 54-yard field goal, 9:25. Packers 10–3. **Drive: 7 plays, 40 yards, 3:54.**
- GB – Jordan Love 2-yard run (Anders Carlson kick), 3:59. Packers 17–3. **Drive: 10 plays, 75 yards, 5:26.**
- GB – Jayden Reed 25-yard pass from Jordan Love (kick failed), 0:08. Packers 23–3. **Drive: 3 plays, 37 yards, 0:18.**

**Third quarter**

- GB – Bo Melton 9-yard pass from Jordan Love (Anders Carlson kick), 0:49. Packers 30–3. **Drive: 13 plays, 90 yards, 8:00.**

**Fourth quarter**

- MIN – Johnny Mundt 6-yard pass from Nick Mullens (Greg Joseph kick), 14:06. Packers 30–10. **Drive: 2 plays, 7 yards, 0:44.**
- GB – Anders Carlson 37-yard field goal, 6:11. Packers 33–10. **Drive: 13 plays, 57 yards, 7:55.**

**Top passers**

- GB – Jordan Love – 24/33, 256 yards, 3 TD
- MIN – Nick Mullens – 13/22, 113 yards, TD

**Top rushers**

- GB – Aaron Jones – 20 rushes, 120 yards
- MIN – Ty Chandler – 10 rushes, 40 yards

**Top receivers**

- GB – Bo Melton – 6 receptions, 105 yards, TD
- MIN – Justin Jefferson – 5 receptions, 59 yards

==== Week 18: vs. Chicago Bears ====
Week 18: Chicago Bears at Green Bay Packers – Game summary

Quarter	1	2	3	4	Total
Bears	3	3	0	3	**9**
**Packers**	0	7	7	3	**17**

at Lambeau Field, Green Bay, Wisconsin

- Date: January 7
- Game time: 3:25 p.m. CST
- Game weather: Cloudy, 34 °F (1 °C)
- Game attendance: 78,188
- Referee: Carl Cheffers
- TV announcers (CBS): Jim Nantz, Tony Romo and Tracy Wolfson
- Recap, Game Book

Game information

**First quarter**

- CHI – Cairo Santos 50-yard field goal, 8:54. Bears 3–0. **Drive: 10 plays, 37 yards, 6:06.**

**Second quarter**

- GB – Dontayvion Wicks 10-yard pass from Jordan Love (Anders Carlson kick), 7:20. Packers 7–3. **Drive: 11 plays, 92 yards, 6:42.**
- CHI – Cairo Santos 39-yard field goal, 1:17. Packers 7–6. **Drive: 11 plays, 45 yards, 6:03.**

**Third quarter**

- GB – Dontayvion Wicks 12-yard pass from Jordan Love (Anders Carlson kick), 9:47. Packers 14–6. **Drive: 9 plays, 75 yards, 5:13.**

**Fourth quarter**

- CHI – Cairo Santos 35-yard field goal, 13:03. Packers 14–9. **Drive: 8 plays, 41 yards, 3:14.**
- GB – Anders Carlson 25-yard field goal, 10:54. Packers 17–9. **Drive: 5 plays, 65 yards, 2:09.**

**Top passers**

- CHI – Justin Fields – 11/16, 148 yards
- GB – Jordan Love – 27/32, 316 yards, 2 TD

**Top rushers**

- CHI – Khalil Herbert – 12 rushes, 28 yards
- GB – Aaron Jones – 22 rushes, 111 yards

**Top receivers**

- CHI – D. J. Moore – 4 receptions, 64 yards
- GB – Dontayvion Wicks – 6 receptions, 61 yards, 2 TD

For the second consecutive year, the Packers faced a win-and-in game against a divisional rival in order to make the playoffs (they lost 20–16 against the Lions). The Packers avenged last year by beating the Bears 17–9 as Jordan Love threw for 316 yards and Wicks caught 2 touchdowns during the game. This was also the Packers 10th straight win over the Bears since 2018. With the win, the Packers became the youngest team to make the playoffs since the NFL went to a 16-game schedule in 1978.

=== Standings ===
==== Division ====
NFC North
	W	L	T	PCT	DIV	CONF	PF	PA	STK
^{(3)} Detroit Lions	12	5	0	.706	4–2	8–4	461	395	W1
^{(7)} Green Bay Packers	9	8	0	.529	4–2	7–5	383	350	W3
Minnesota Vikings	7	10	0	.412	2–4	6–6	344	362	L4
Chicago Bears	7	10	0	.412	2–4	6–6	360	379	L1

==== Conference ====
NFC
#	Team	Division	W	L	T	PCT	DIV	CONF	SOS	SOV	STK
**Division leaders**
1 (Note: San Francisco finished ahead of Dallas and Detroit based on conference record, claiming the No. 1 seed.)	San Francisco 49ers	West	12	5	0	.706	5–1	10–2	.509	.475	L1
2 (Note: Dallas claimed the No. 2 seed over Detroit based on head-to-head victory.)	Dallas Cowboys	East	12	5	0	.706	5–1	9–3	.446	.392	W2
3	Detroit Lions	North	12	5	0	.706	4–2	8–4	.481	.436	W1
4 (Note: Tampa Bay finished ahead of New Orleans in the NFC South based on common record. (Tampa Bay is 8–4 against Minnesota, Chicago, Detroit, Green Bay, Atlanta, Carolina, Houston, Tennessee, Jacksonville, and Indianapolis, while New Orleans is 6–6 against the same teams.))	Tampa Bay Buccaneers	South	9	8	0	.529	4–2	7–5	.481	.379	W1
**Wild cards**
5	Philadelphia Eagles	East	11	6	0	.647	4–2	7–5	.481	.476	L2
6	Los Angeles Rams	West	10	7	0	.588	5–1	8–4	.529	.453	W4
7 (Note: Green Bay and Seattle finished ahead of New Orleans based on conference record.) (Note: Green Bay finished ahead of Seattle based on strength of victory, claiming the 7th and final playoff spot.)	Green Bay Packers	North	9	8	0	.529	4–2	7–5	.474	.458	W3
**Did not qualify for the postseason**
8	Seattle Seahawks	West	9	8	0	.529	2–4	7–5	.512	.392	W1
9	New Orleans Saints	South	9	8	0	.529	4–2	6–6	.433	.340	W2
10 (Note: Minnesota finished ahead of Atlanta based on head-to-head victory. Division tie break was initially used to eliminate Chicago (see below).) (Note: Minnesota finished ahead of Chicago based on common record. (Minnesota is 5–7 against Tampa Bay, Los Angeles Chargers, Carolina, Kansas City, Green Bay, Atlanta, New Orleans, Denver, Las Vegas, and Detroit, while Chicago is 4–8 against the same teams.))	Minnesota Vikings	North	7	10	0	.412	2–4	6–6	.509	.454	L4
11 (Note: Chicago finished ahead of Atlanta based on head-to-head victory.)	Chicago Bears	North	7	10	0	.412	2–4	6–6	.464	.370	L1
12	Atlanta Falcons	South	7	10	0	.412	3–3	4–8	.429	.462	L2
13	New York Giants	East	6	11	0	.353	3–3	5–7	.512	.353	W1
14 (Note: Washington finished ahead of Arizona based on head-to-head victory.)	Washington Commanders	East	4	13	0	.235	0–6	2–10	.512	.338	L8
15	Arizona Cardinals	West	4	13	0	.235	0–6	3–9	.561	.588	L1
16	Carolina Panthers	South	2	15	0	.118	1–5	1–11	.522	.500	L3
**Tiebreakers** (Note: When breaking ties for three or more teams under the NFL's rules, they are first broken within divisions, then comparing only the highest-ranked remaining team from each division.)

== Postseason ==
=== Schedule ===
Round	Date	Opponent (seed)	Result	Record	Venue	Recap
Wild Card	January 14	at Dallas Cowboys (2)	W 48–32	1–0	AT&T Stadium	Recap
Divisional	January 20	at San Francisco 49ers (1)	L 21–24	1–1	Levi's Stadium	Recap

=== Game summaries ===
==== NFC Wild Card Playoffs: at (2) Dallas Cowboys ====
NFC Wild Card Playoffs: (7) Green Bay Packers at (2) Dallas Cowboys – Game summary

Quarter	1	2	3	4	Total
Packers	7	20	14	7	48
Cowboys	0	7	9	16	32

at AT&T Stadium, Arlington, Texas

- Date: January 14, 2024
- Game time: 3:40 p.m. CST
- Game weather: None (retractable roof closed)
- Game attendance: 93,799
- Referee: Ronald Torbert
- TV announcers (Fox): Kevin Burkhardt, Greg Olsen, Erin Andrews and Tom Rinaldi
- Recap, Game Book

Game information

First quarter

- GB – Aaron Jones 3-yard run (Anders Carlson kick), 7:08. Packers 7–0. Drive: 12 plays, 75 yards, 7:52.

Second quarter

- GB – Aaron Jones 1-yard run (Anders Carlson kick), 14:15. Packers 14–0. Drive: 3 plays, 19 yards, 1:28.
- GB – Dontayvion Wicks 20-yard pass from Jordan Love (kick failed), 3:23. Packers 20–0. Drive: 10 plays, 93 yards, 5:44.
- GB – Darnell Savage 64-yard interception return (Anders Carlson kick), 1:50. Packers 27–0.
- DAL – Jake Ferguson 1-yard pass from Dak Prescott (Brandon Aubrey kick), 0:00. Packers 27–7. Drive: 12 plays, 55 yards, 1:50.

Third quarter

- DAL – Brandon Aubrey 34-yard field goal, 9:23. Packers 27–10. Drive: 12 plays, 60 yards, 5:37.
- GB – Aaron Jones 9-yard run (Anders Carlson kick), 6:38. Packers 34–10. Drive: 5 plays, 75 yards, 2:45.
- DAL – Tony Pollard 1-yard run (kick failed), 3:03. Packers 34–16. Drive: 5 plays, 75 yards, 2:45.
- GB – Luke Musgrave 38-yard pass from Jordan Love (Anders Carlson kick), 1:27. Packers 41–16. Drive: 3 plays, 75 yards, 1:36.

Fourth quarter

- GB – Romeo Doubs 3-yard pass from Jordan Love (Anders Carlson kick), 10:23. Packers 48–16. Drive: 8 plays, 40 yards, 4:37.
- DAL – Jake Ferguson 7-yard pass from Dak Prescott (Rico Dowdle run), 5:54. Packers 48–24. Drive: 11 plays, 75 yards, 4:29.
- DAL – Jake Ferguson 14-yard pass from Dak Prescott (Dak Prescott run), 3:25. Packers 48–32. Drive: 4 plays, 91 yards, 1:24.

Top passers

- GB – Jordan Love – 16/21, 272 yards, 3 TD
- DAL – Dak Prescott – 41/60, 403 yards, 3 TD, 2 INT

Top rushers

- GB – Aaron Jones – 21 rushes, 118 yards, 3 TD
- DAL – Tony Pollard – 15 rushes, 56 yards, TD

Top receivers

- GB – Romeo Doubs – 6 receptions, 151 yards, TD
- DAL – CeeDee Lamb – 9 receptions, 110 yards

With the win, the Packers became the first 7-seed to win a playoff game in NFL history, having previously gone 0–6 in the last 3 seasons.

==== NFC Divisional Playoffs: at (1) San Francisco 49ers ====
NFC Divisional Playoffs: (7) Green Bay Packers at (1) San Francisco 49ers – Game summary

Quarter	1	2	3	4	Total
Packers	3	3	15	0	21
49ers	0	7	7	10	24

at Levi's Stadium, Santa Clara, California

- Date: January 20, 2024
- Game time: 7:15 p.m. CST/5:15 p.m. PST
- Game weather: Rain, 59 °F (15 °C)
- Game attendance: 71,824
- Referee: Alex Kemp
- TV announcers (Fox): Kevin Burkhardt, Greg Olsen, Erin Andrews, and Tom Rinaldi
- Recap, Game Book

Game information

First quarter

- GB – Anders Carlson 29-yard field goal, 7:22. Packers 3–0. Drive: 14 plays, 58 yards, 7:38.

Second quarter

- SF – George Kittle 30-yard pass from Brock Purdy (Jake Moody kick), 8:42. 49ers 7–3. Drive: 12 plays, 86 yards, 5:48.
- GB – Anders Carlson 29-yard field goal, 4:09. 49ers 7–6. Drive: 10 plays, 64 yards, 4:33.

Third quarter

- GB – Bo Melton 19-yard pass from Jordan Love (Anders Carlson kick), 9:27. Packers 13–7. Drive: 9 plays, 75 yards, 4:01.
- SF – Christian McCaffrey 39-yard run (Jake Moody kick), 7:39. 49ers 14–13. Drive: 4 plays, 75 yards, 1:48.
- GB – Tucker Kraft 2-yard pass from Jordan Love (Aaron Jones pass from Jordan Love), 5:23. Packers 21–14. Drive: 4 plays, 20 yards, 2:16.

Fourth quarter

- SF – Jake Moody 52-yard field goal, 14:56. Packers 21–17. Drive: 7 plays, 14 yards, 2:06.
- SF – Christian McCaffrey 6-yard run (Jake Moody kick), 1:07. 49ers 24–21. Drive: 12 plays, 69 yards, 5:11.

Top passers

- GB – Jordan Love – 21/34, 194 yards, 2 TD, 2 INT
- SF – Brock Purdy – 23/39, 252 yards, TD

Top rushers

- GB – Aaron Jones – 18 rushes, 108 yards
- SF – Christian McCaffrey – 17 rushes, 98 yards, 2 TD

Top receivers

- GB – Romeo Doubs – 4 receptions, 83 yards
- SF – George Kittle – 4 receptions, 81 yards, TD

This was the 10th playoff meeting all time between these two teams, an NFL record. Additionally, this was also the first-ever playoff matchup between the 1st seed and the 7th seed in NFL history.

== Statistics ==
=== Starters ===
==== Regular season ====
Offense

Pos.	Name	GS
QB	Jordan Love	17
RB	Aaron Jones; A. J. Dillon	11; 6
WR	Romeo Doubs; Malik Heath	16; 1
WR2	Christian Watson; Dontayvion Wicks; Jayden Reed	9; 6; 2
WR3	Jayden Reed; Bo Melton	11; 1
TE	Luke Musgrave; Tucker Kraft; Josiah Deguara; Ben Sims	9; 6; 1; 1
TE2	Josiah Deguara; Tucker Kraft	3; 2
LT	Rasheed Walker; David Bakhtiari; Yosh Nijman	15; 1; 1
LG	Elgton Jenkins; Royce Newman	15; 2
C	Josh Myers	17
RG	Jon Runyan Jr.	17
RT	Zach Tom	17

Defense

Pos.	Name	GS
DE	Kenny Clark	17
NT	Tedarrell Slaton	17
DE	Devonte Wyatt	5
OLB	Preston Smith	17
OLB	Rashan Gary; Kingsley Enagbare	13; 4
ILB	De'Vondre Campbell; Isaiah McDuffie	12; 4
ILB	Quay Walker; Isaiah McDuffie	13; 4
CB	Carrington Valentine; Jaire Alexander	10; 7
CB2	Rasul Douglas; Corey Ballentine; Eric Stokes; Carrington Valentine	7; 6; 2; 2
CB3	Keisean Nixon	13
S	Rudy Ford; Anthony Johnson Jr. Jonathan Owens	9; 4; 4
S2	Darnell Savage; Jonathan Owens	10; 7

==== Postseason ====
Offense

Pos.	Name	GS
QB	Jordan Love	2
RB	Aaron Jones	2
WR	Romeo Doubs	2
WR2	Dontayvion Wicks	2
WR3	Jayden Reed	1
TE	Luke Musgrave	1
TE2	Tucker Kraft	2
LT	Rasheed Walker	2
LG	Elgton Jenkins	2
C	Josh Myers	2
RG	Jon Runyan Jr.	2
RT	Zach Tom	2

Defense

Pos.	Name	GS
DE	Kenny Clark	2
DE2	Devonte Wyatt	1
NT	Tedarrell Slaton	2
OLB	Preston Smith	2
OLB	Rashan Gary	2
ILB	De'Vondre Campbell	1
ILB	Quay Walker	2
LB	Isaiah McDuffie	1
CB	Jaire Alexander	2
CB2	Carrington Valentine	2
CB3	Keisean Nixon	1
S	Jonathan Owens	2
S2	Darnell Savage	2

=== Team leaders ===
Category	Player(s)	Value
Passing yards	Jordan Love	4,159
Passing touchdowns	Jordan Love	32
Rushing yards	Aaron Jones	656
Rushing touchdowns	Jordan Love	4
Receptions	Jayden Reed	64
Receiving yards	Jayden Reed	793
Receiving touchdowns	Romeo Doubs; Jayden Reed	8
Kickoff return yards	Keisean Nixon	782
Punt return yards	Keisean Nixon	95
Tackles	Quay Walker	118
Sacks	Rashan Gary	9.0
Interceptions	Rudy Ford	2

=== League rankings ===
Category	Total yards	Yards per game	NFL rank (out of 32)
Passing offense	3968	233.4	12th
Rushing offense	1905	112.1	15th
Total offense	5873	345.5	11th
Passing defense	3515	206.8	9th
Rushing defense	2181	128.3	28th
Total defense	5696	335.1	17th

Category	Total points	Points per game	NFL rank (out of 32)
Offensive points scored	383	22.5	12th
Defensive points allowed	350	20.6	10th

Statistical values are correct after the end of the regular season.

== Awards ==
Recipient	Award(s)
Jordan Love	Week 17: NFC Offensive Player of the Week; Week 18: NFC Offensive Player of the Week; Week 18: FedEx Air Player of the Week
Keisean Nixon	All-Pro
