= Ben Sims =

American football player (born 2000)

No. 49 – Seattle Seahawks
- Position: Tight end
- Roster status: Practice squad

Personal information
- Born: May 16, 2000 (age 26); San Antonio, Texas, U.S.
- Listed height: 6 ft 5 in (1.96 m)
- Listed weight: 251 lb (114 kg)

Career information
- High school: Clark (San Antonio, Texas)
- College: Baylor (2018–2022)
- NFL draft: 2023: undrafted

Career history
- Minnesota Vikings (2023)*; Green Bay Packers (2023–2025); Minnesota Vikings (2025); Miami Dolphins (2026)*; Seattle Seahawks (2026–present)*
- * Offseason or practice squad member only

Career NFL statistics as of 2025
- Receptions: 11
- Receiving yards: 93
- Receiving touchdowns: 1
- Stats at Pro Football Reference

Ben Sims (born May 16, 2000) is an American professional football tight end for the Seattle Seahawks of the National Football League (NFL). He played college football for the Baylor Bears.

== Early life ==
Sims was born on May 16, 2000. He attended Clark High School in San Antonio, Texas and was ranked a three-star recruit after totaling 24 catches for 444 yards and seven touchdowns while playing tight end as a senior. ESPN ranked him the 28th-best tight end nationally and Sims committed to play college football for the Baylor Bears over several other offers, including from Auburn, Arizona State and Texas Tech.

== College career ==
Sims played five seasons for Baylor and was one of the most productive tight ends for the Bears in their history. As a true freshman in 2018, he redshirted while playing three games, and the following year, he made an appearance in eight games. In 2020, Sims became a starter for Baylor and posted 14 receptions for 164 yards and a team-high (tied) three touchdowns. When he scored for the first time, it was the first touchdown by a player at his position for the team since 2017.

In 2021, Sims had 31 catches for 361 yards and nine touchdowns; his nine scores were the most for a tight end in Baylor history. He was named honorable mention all-conference for his performance. He returned for a final season in 2022 and tallied 31 receptions for 255 yards, being named honorable mention all-conference and second-team All-Texas. He finished his collegiate career as Baylor's all-time leader in touchdowns by a tight end (12), additionally having the second-most receptions (78) and the fourth-most yards (785). He was invited to the NFLPA Collegiate Bowl after his final year and scored a touchdown in the game.

== Professional career ==
Pre-draft measurables
Height	Weight	Arm length	Hand span	Wingspan	40-yard dash	10-yard split	20-yard split	20-yard shuttle	Three-cone drill	Vertical jump	Broad jump	Bench press
6 ft 4 5/8 in (1.95 m)	250 lb (113 kg)	33 1/8 in (0.84 m)	9 1/2 in (0.24 m)	6 ft 8 1/8 in (2.04 m)	4.59 s	1.56 s	2.68 s	4.41 s	7.46 s	36.0 in (0.91 m)	10 ft 2 in (3.10 m)	15 reps
All values from Baylor's Pro Day

=== Minnesota Vikings (first stint) ===
After going unselected in the 2023 NFL draft, Sims was signed by the Minnesota Vikings as an undrafted free agent. In preseason, he caught three passes for 53 yards with a long of 33. He was waived at the final roster cuts, on August 29, 2023.

=== Green Bay Packers ===
On August 31, 2023, Sims was claimed off waivers by the Green Bay Packers. Sims is one of the three new additions Tight ends alongside Tucker Kraft and Luke Musgrave. Sims scored his first touchdown, receiving a pass from Jordan Love, during a Week 13 home win over the Kansas City Chiefs, which he celebrated with a Lambeau Leap.

On October 25, 2025, Sims was waived by the Packers.

=== Minnesota Vikings (second stint) ===
On October 27, 2025, Sims was claimed off waivers by the Minnesota Vikings.

=== Miami Dolphins ===
On March 16, 2026, Sims signed with the Miami Dolphins on a one-year contract. He was waived/injured by Miami on August 31.

=== Seattle Seahawks ===
On October 27, 2026, Sims signed with the Seattle Seahawks practice squad.

== NFL career statistics ==
=== Regular season ===
Year	Team	Games		Receiving					Fumbles	
Year	Team	GP	GS	Rec	Yds	Y/R	Lng	TD	Fum	Lost
2023	GB	17	1	4	21	5.3	12	1	0	0
2024	GB	17	5	4	42	10.5	28	0	0	0
2025	GB	3	0	0	0	0.0	0	0	0	0
2025	MIN	8	2	3	30	10.0	18	0	0	0
Career		45	8	11	93	8.5	28	1	0	0
Source: pro-football-reference.com

=== Postseason ===
Year	Team	Games		Receiving					Fumbles	
Year	Team	GP	GS	Rec	Yds	Y/R	Lng	TD	Fum	Lost
2023	GB	2	0	1	4	4.0	4	0	0	0
Career		2	0	1	4	4.0	4	0	0	0
Source: pro-football-reference.com
