= Lukas Van Ness =

American football player (born 2001)

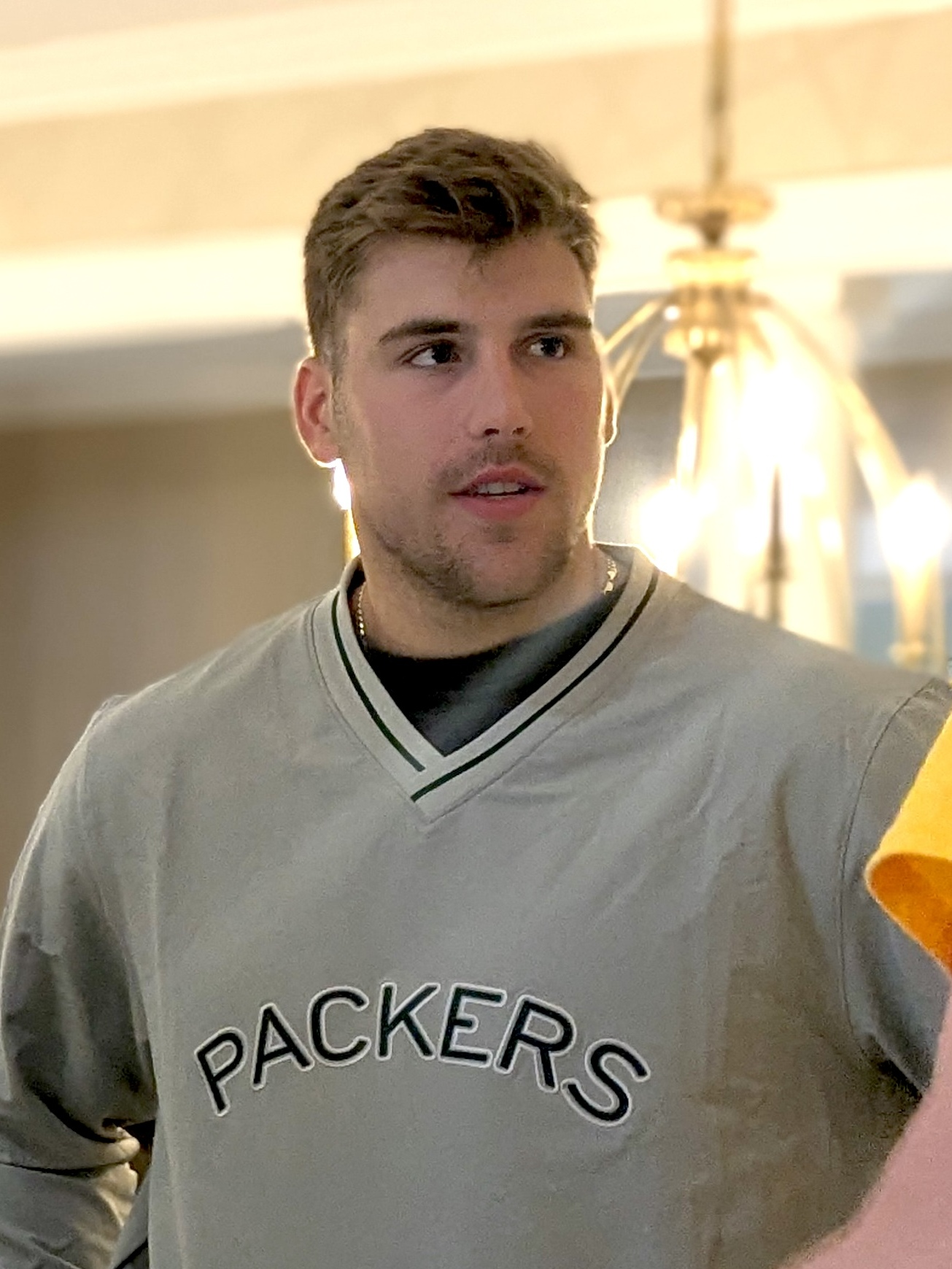
- Van Ness in 2025

No. 90 – Green Bay Packers
- Position: Outside linebacker
- Roster status: Active

Personal information
- Born: July 6, 2001 (age 25); Barrington, Illinois, U.S.
- Listed height: 6 ft 5 in (1.96 m)
- Listed weight: 272 lb (123 kg)

Career information
- High school: Barrington
- College: Iowa (2020–2022)
- NFL draft: 2023: 1st round, 13th overall pick

Career history
- Green Bay Packers (2023–present)

Awards and highlights
- Second-team All-Big Ten (2022)

Career NFL statistics as of Week 10, 2026
- Total tackles: 122
- Sacks: 14.5
- Forced fumbles: 1
- Fumble recoveries: 1
- Pass deflections: 2
- Stats at Pro Football Reference

Lukas Van Ness (born July 6, 2001) is an American professional football outside linebacker for the Green Bay Packers of the National Football League (NFL). He played college football for the Iowa Hawkeyes and was selected by the Packers in the first round of the 2023 NFL draft.

== Early life ==
Van Ness was born on July 6, 2001, in Barrington, Illinois. He later attended Barrington High School, where he played football and ice hockey. He was rated a three-star recruit and committed to play college football at Iowa over offers from Illinois, Minnesota, and Kansas.

== Personal life ==
Van Ness has two sisters named Hanna, who is the older sister, and Ella, who is the younger sister, as well as a younger brother named Devan who plays football and lacrosse while attending Barrington High School in Illinois.

During the live television broadcast coverage of the 2023 National Football League Draft when footage showed Van Ness and Hanna seated next to each other on a couch, fans, who did not know she is his older sister, mistakenly identified her as his girlfriend.

== College career ==
Van Ness redshirted his true freshman season at the University of Iowa. Playing both defensive end and defensive tackle, he became a starter as a redshirt freshman and had 33 tackles, 8.5 tackles for loss, and seven sacks. At the end of the season, Van Ness was named a Freshman All-American by the Football Writers Association of America. During his redshirt sophomore season, he was named the Big Ten Conference Special Teams Player of the Week after blocking two kicks in a 10–7 loss to Iowa State.

== Professional career ==
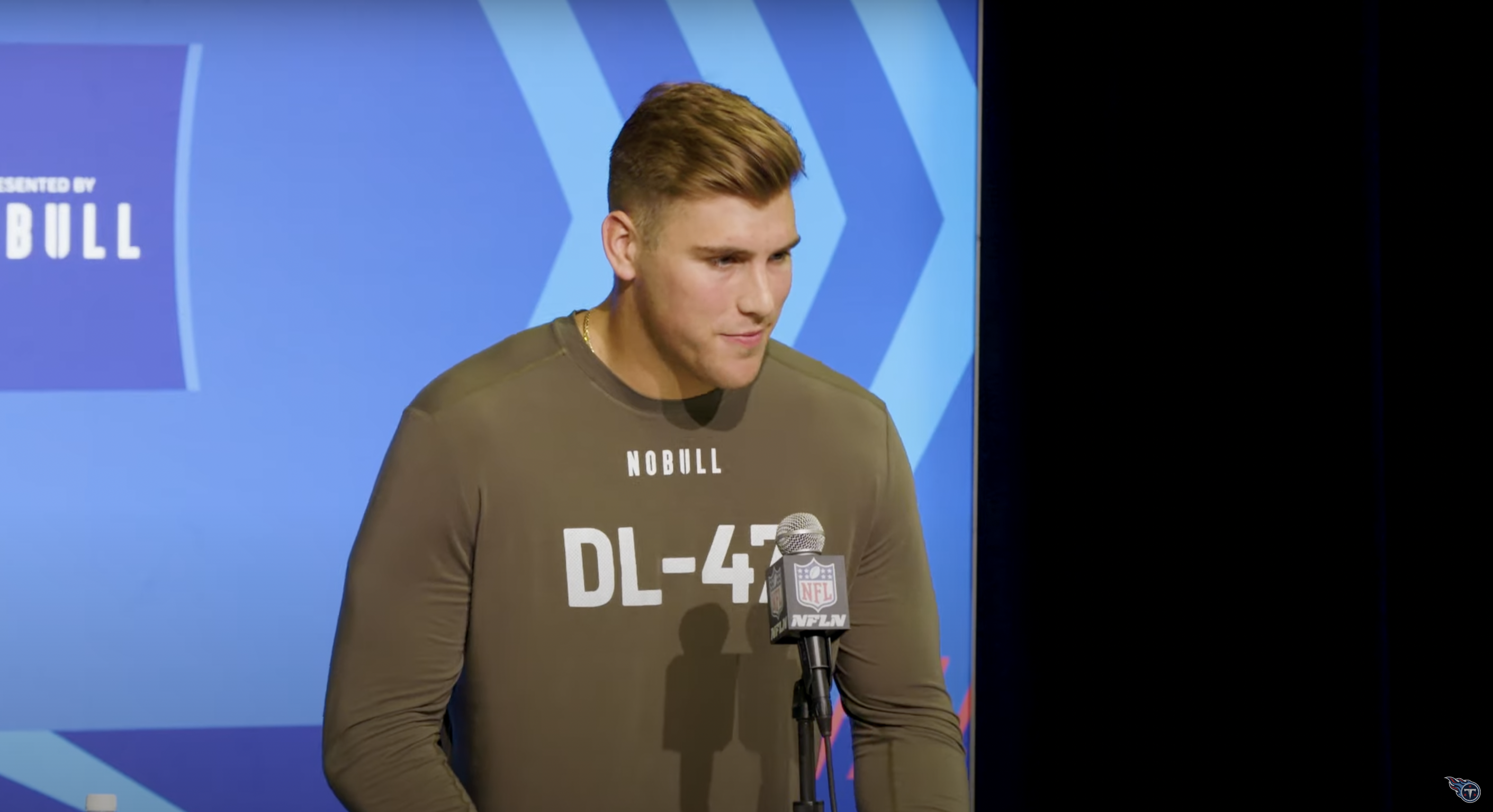
Van Ness at the 2023 NFL Combine

Pre-draft measurables
Height	Weight	Arm length	Hand span	Wingspan	40-yard dash	10-yard split	20-yard split	20-yard shuttle	Three-cone drill	Vertical jump	Broad jump	Bench press
6 ft 5 in (1.96 m)	272 lb (123 kg)	34 in (0.86 m)	11 in (0.28 m)	6 ft 9 3/4 in (2.08 m)	4.58 s	1.64 s	2.66 s	4.32 s	7.02 s	31.0 in (0.79 m)	9 ft 10 in (3.00 m)	17 reps
All values from NFL Combine

Van Ness was selected by the Green Bay Packers in the first round (13th overall) of the 2023 NFL draft. The Packers initially held the 15th selection in the draft before trading up two spots with the New York Jets to move up to 13th. He signed his rookie contract on June 27, 2023.

He saw his first NFL action on September 10, 2023, against the Chicago Bears, recording his first career sack on Justin Fields during a 38–20 win. His second sack came in a week 13, 27–19 victory over the Kansas City Chiefs.

On April 30, 2026, the Packers exercised the fifth-year option on Van Ness' contract.

== NFL career statistics ==
=== Regular season ===
Year	Team	Games		Tackles					Fumbles				Interceptions			
Year	Team	GP	GS	Cmb	Solo	Ast	Sck	TFL	FF	FR	Yds	TD	Int	Yds	TD	PD
2023	GB	17	0	32	24	8	4.0	8	0	0	0	0	0	0	0	1
2024	GB	17	0	33	22	11	3.0	6	1	1	0	0	0	0	0	0
2025	GB	9	2	19	12	7	1.5	3	0	0	0	0	0	0	0	0
Career		43	2	84	58	26	8.5	17	1	1	0	0	0	0	0	1
Source: pro-football-reference.com

=== Postseason ===
Year	Team	Games		Tackles					Fumbles				Interceptions			
Year	Team	GP	GS	Cmb	Solo	Ast	Sck	TFL	FF	FR	Yds	TD	Int	Yds	TD	PD
2023	GB	2	0	5	4	1	1.0	1	0	0	0	0	0	0	0	0
2024	GB	1	0	4	1	3	0	0	0	0	0	0	0	0	0	0
2025	GB	1	0	3	1	2	1.0	1	1	0	0	0	0	0	0	0
Career		4	0	12	6	6	2.0	2	1	0	0	0	0	0	0	0
Source: pro-football-reference.com
