= Corey Ballentine =

Jamaican-American football player (born 1996)

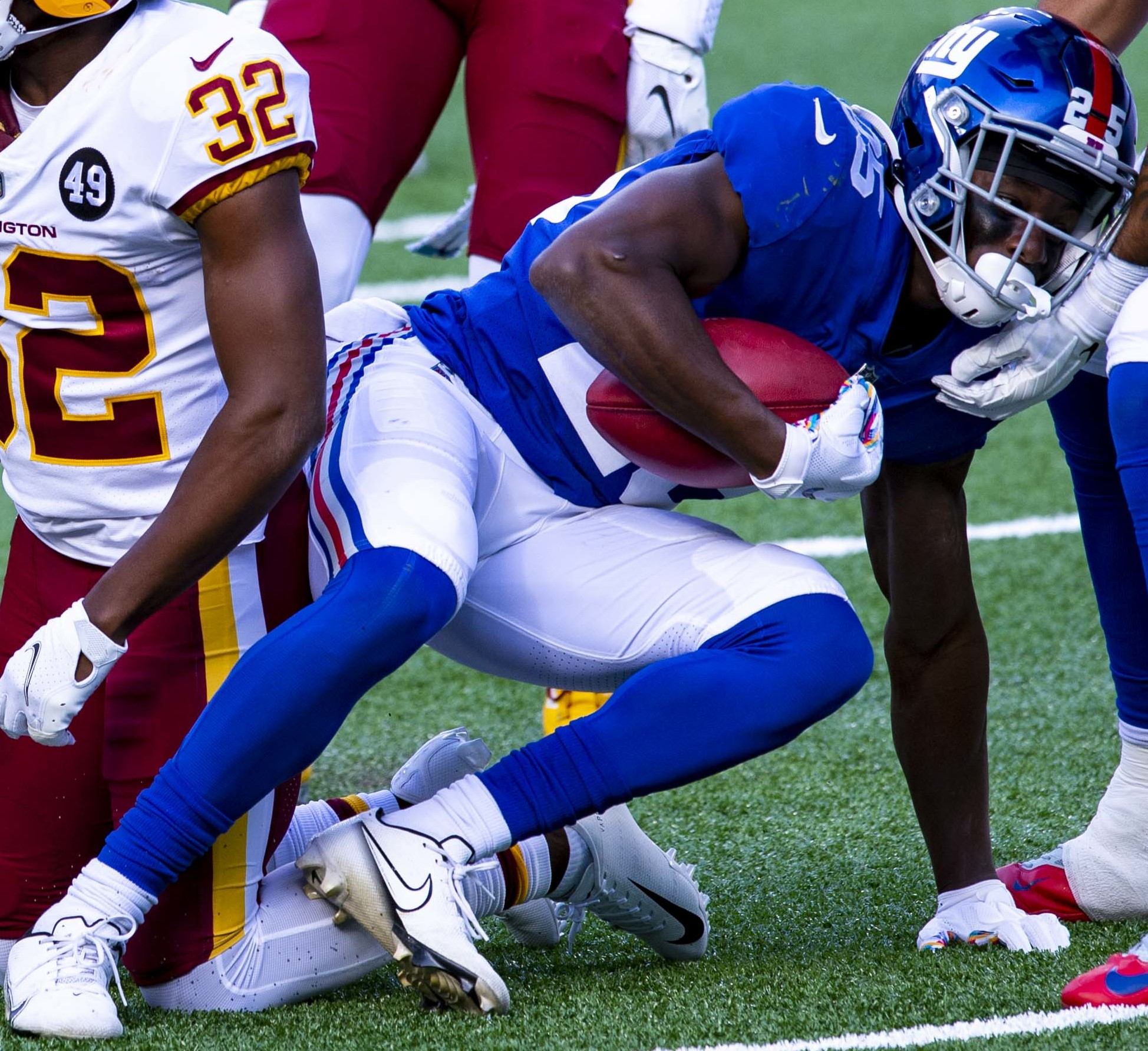
- Ballentine with the New York Giants in 2020

Profile
- Position: Cornerback

Personal information
- Born: April 13, 1996 (age 30); Montego Bay, Jamaica
- Listed height: 6 ft 0 in (1.83 m)
- Listed weight: 191 lb (87 kg)

Career information
- High school: Shawnee Heights (Tecumseh, Kansas, U.S.)
- College: Washburn (2014–2018)
- NFL draft: 2019: 6th round, 180th overall pick

Career history
- New York Giants (2019–2020); New York Jets (2020–2021); Detroit Lions (2021); Atlanta Falcons (2022)*; Arizona Cardinals (2022)*; Green Bay Packers (2022–2024); Indianapolis Colts (2025)*; Green Bay Packers (2025)*; New England Patriots (2025); Dallas Cowboys (2025); Jacksonville Jaguars (2026)*
- * Offseason or practice squad member only

Awards and highlights
- 2018 Cliff Harris Award winner

Career NFL statistics as of 2025
- Total tackles: 103
- Forced fumbles: 2
- Pass deflections: 9
- Interceptions: 1
- Return yards: 876
- Stats at Pro Football Reference

Corey Ballentine (born April 13, 1996) is a Jamaican-American professional football cornerback. He played college football for the Washburn Ichabods, and was selected by the New York Giants in the sixth round of the 2019 NFL draft. He has also played for the New York Jets, Detroit Lions, Atlanta Falcons, Arizona Cardinals, Green Bay Packers, and New England Patriots.

== Early life ==
Ballentine was born in Jamaica and moved to Kansas when he was six years old.

== College career ==
After playing at Shawnee Heights High School, Ballentine played college football at Division II Washburn, Ballentine played in 46 games after almost quitting the team in the summer before his freshman year. He primarily played on defense but also served as the team's kick returner and blocked four field goals. Ballentine won the Cliff Harris Award after the conclusion of his senior season, which is given annually to the nation's top small college defensive players. He was also named a 2018 second-team AFCA All-American.

After his senior year, Ballentine was invited to the 2019 Senior Bowl, where he drew attention for his speed. He also participated in the 2019 NFL Scouting Combine. Corey also has a personal best of 10.51, in the 100m, and 21.25 in the 200m while running track at Washburn.

== Professional career ==
Pre-draft measurables
Height	Weight	Arm length	Hand span	Wingspan	40-yard dash	10-yard split	20-yard split	20-yard shuttle	Three-cone drill	Vertical jump	Broad jump	Bench press
5 ft 11 in (1.80 m)	196 lb (89 kg)	31 5/8 in (0.80 m)	9 1/2 in (0.24 m)	6 ft 5 in (1.96 m)	4.47 s	1.52 s	2.62 s	4.14 s	6.82 s	39.5 in (1.00 m)	11 ft 3 in (3.43 m)	15 reps
All values from NFL Combine

=== New York Giants ===
Ballentine was selected by the New York Giants in the sixth round (180th overall) of the 2019 NFL draft.

On November 10, 2020, Ballentine was waived by the Giants.

=== New York Jets ===
Ballentine was claimed off waivers by the New York Jets on November 11, 2020. He was waived/injured on August 23, 2021, and placed on injured reserve. Ballentine was released by New York on September 15.

=== Detroit Lions ===
On September 16, 2021, Ballentine was claimed off waivers by the Detroit Lions. He was placed on injured reserve on October 15. Ballentine was activated on November 18, then waived the next day and re-signed to the practice squad.

=== Atlanta Falcons ===
On January 12, 2022, Ballentine signed a reserve/future contract the Atlanta Falcons. He was waived by Atlanta on August 30.

=== Arizona Cardinals ===
On September 7, 2022, the Arizona Cardinals signed Ballentine to their practice squad. He was released off the practice squad thirteen days later.

=== Green Bay Packers (first stint) ===
On September 28, 2022, the Green Bay Packers signed Ballentine to their practice squad. He was promoted to the active roster on November 12. On March 20, 2023, Ballentine re-signed with the Packers. He was released by Green Bay on August 29. A day later, Ballentine was re-signed to the Packers' practice squad. He was elevated to the active roster for Week 3 of the 2023 season. Ballentine was promoted to the active roster on October 25.

On March 12, 2024, Ballentine re-signed with the Packers.

=== Indianapolis Colts ===
On March 14, 2025, Ballentine signed with the Indianapolis Colts. He was released by Indianapolis on August 1.

=== Green Bay Packers (second stint) ===
On August 4, 2025, Ballentine signed a contract to return to the Green Bay Packers. He was waived on August 26 as part of final roster cuts.

=== New England Patriots ===
On August 28, 2025, Ballentine signed a contract to join the New England Patriots practice squad. He appeared in one regular season game before being released on September 23.

=== Dallas Cowboys ===
On September 25, 2025, the Dallas Cowboys signed Ballentine to their practice squad. He was promoted to the active roster on December 24. He appeared in 5 games and had two special teams tackles.

On March 23, 2026, Ballentine re-signed with the Cowboys on a one-year, $1.3 million contract. He was released by Dallas on June 18.

=== Jacksonville Jaguars ===
On July 28, 2026, Ballentine signed with the Jacksonville Jaguars. He was released by Jacksonville on August 30 as part of final roster cuts.

== NFL career statistics ==
=== Regular season ===
Year	Team	Games		Tackles				Interceptions						Fumbles	
Year	Team	GP	GS	Comb	Total	Ast	Sck	PD	Int	Yds	Avg	Lng	TDs	FF	FR
2019	NYG	13	2	26	21	5	0.0	2	0	0	0.0	0	0	0	0
2020	NYG	9	2	16	13	3	0.0	0	0	0	0.0	0	0	0	0
2020	NYJ	6	0	4	4	0	0.0	0	0	0	0.0	0	0	0	0
2021	DET	4	0	0	0	0	0.0	0	0	0	0.0	0	0	0	0
2022	GB	8	0	5	4	1	0.0	0	0	0	0.0	0	0	1	0
2023	GB	14	6	43	28	15	0.0	7	1	0	0.0	0	0	0	0
2024	GB	15	1	6	6	0	0.0	0	0	0	0.0	0	0	1	0
2025	NE	1	0	1	0	1	0.0	0	0	0	0.0	0	0	0	0
2025	DAL	5	0	2	0	2	0.0	0	0	0	0.0	0	0	0	0
Career		75	11	103	76	27	0.0	9	1	0	0.0	0	0	2	0
Source: pro-football-reference.com

=== Postseason ===
Year	Team	Games		Tackles				Interceptions						Fumbles	
Year	Team	GP	GS	Comb	Total	Ast	Sck	PD	Int	Yds	Avg	Lng	TDs	FF	FR
2023	GB	2	0	5	4	1	0.0	0	0	0	0.0	0	0	0	0
2024	GB	1	0	0	0	0	0.0	0	0	0	0.0	0	0	0	0
Career		3	0	5	4	1	0.0	0	0	0	0.0	0	0	0	0
Source: pro-football-referencecom

== Personal life ==
Ballentine was born in Montego Bay, Jamaica and moved to the United States at six years of age. While at Shawnee Heights and Washburn, Ballentine ran track while playing football, setting Ichabod records for various indoor and outdoor sprinting events.

In the early morning hours of April 28, 2019, the Sunday following the 2019 NFL draft, Ballentine was injured in a shooting in Topeka while he was attending an off-campus party. Ballentine's college roommate and defensive backfield teammate Dwane Simmons was killed in the shooting.
