= Ruffin Hamilton =

American football player (born 1971)

No. 58, 54
- Position: Linebacker

Personal information
- Born: March 2, 1971 (age 55); Detroit, Michigan, U.S.
- Listed height: 6 ft 1 in (1.85 m)
- Listed weight: 235 lb (107 kg)

Career information
- High school: Northeast (Pride, Louisiana)
- College: Tulane
- NFL draft: 1994: 6th round, 175th overall pick

Career history
- Green Bay Packers (1994); Atlanta Falcons (1997–1999)

Career NFL statistics
- Tackles: 20
- Passes defended: 1
- Stats at Pro Football Reference

Ruffin Hamilton III (born March 2, 1971) is an American former professional football player who was a linebacker in the National Football League (NFL). After playing college football for the Tulane Green Wave, he played in the NFL for the Green Bay Packers and the Atlanta Falcons.

== College career ==
He played at the collegiate level at Tulane University. He also was a guard in basketball during his time there.

== Professional career ==
Hamilton was selected by the Green Bay Packers in the sixth round of the 1994 NFL draft and spent the 1994 NFL season with the team. After two years away from the NFL, he spent three seasons with the Atlanta Falcons.

== Personal life ==
Hamilton was born on March 2, 1971, in Detroit, Michigan. His son Elijah Hamilton is a cornerback for the St. Louis Battlehawks of the XFL who also played for the Green Bay Packers and Miami Dolphins.
