= Carrington Valentine =

American football player (born 2001)

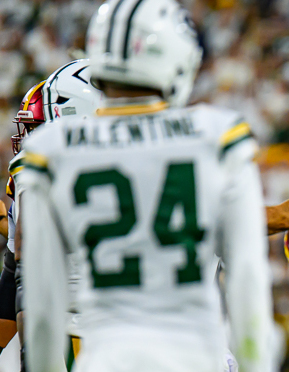
- Valentine in 2025

No. 24 – Green Bay Packers
- Position: Cornerback
- Roster status: Active

Personal information
- Born: September 9, 2001 (age 25); Cincinnati, Ohio, U.S.
- Listed height: 6 ft 0 in (1.83 m)
- Listed weight: 189 lb (86 kg)

Career information
- High school: Moeller (Hamilton County, Ohio)
- College: Kentucky (2020–2022)
- NFL draft: 2023: 7th round, 232nd overall pick

Career history
- Green Bay Packers (2023–present)

Career NFL statistics as of Week 10, 2026
- Total tackles: 120
- Forced fumbles: 2
- Fumble recoveries: 1
- Pass deflections: 21
- Interceptions: 2
- Stats at Pro Football Reference

Carrington Jadon Valentine (born September 9, 2001) is an American professional football cornerback for the Green Bay Packers of the National Football League (NFL). He played college football for the Kentucky Wildcats.

== Early life ==
Valentine grew up in Cincinnati, Ohio. He attended Moeller High School and was a basketball and football player, helping the school win a state championship in the former. In football, he was only a wide receiver and special teams player until his junior year, when he began playing cornerback as well. By the time he graduated, Valentine was ranked as one of the 100-best cornerback recruits nationally, as well as a top-25 player in the state according to Rivals.com. He committed to play college football at Kentucky over offers from Cincinnati, Michigan State, Louisville and Pittsburgh, among others.

== College career ==
As a true freshman at Kentucky in 2020, Valentine appeared in 10 games and totaled 10 tackles, one pass breakup and a fumble recovery. The following year, he started 12 of 13 games and ranked fourth on the team with 61 tackles, additionally posting five pass breakups, 1.5 tackles-for-loss and one sack. In 2022, Valentine remained a starter and recorded 10 pass breakups, 46 tackles, one fumble recovery and one sack, while also making the only interception of his college career against Youngstown State. Although he had eligibility remaining, he opted to declare for the NFL draft, and finished his stint at Kentucky with 117 tackles and 16 pass breakups in 35 games played.

== Professional career ==
Pre-draft measurables
Height	Weight	Arm length	Hand span	Wingspan	40-yard dash	10-yard split	20-yard split	20-yard shuttle	Vertical jump	Broad jump	Bench press
5 ft 11 5/8 in (1.82 m)	193 lb (88 kg)	32 1/4 in (0.82 m)	9 1/4 in (0.23 m)	6 ft 4 in (1.93 m)	4.44 s	1.52 s	2.50 s	4.15 s	39.0 in (0.99 m)	10 ft 8 in (3.25 m)	9 reps
All values from NFL Combine/Pro Day

Valentine was selected by the Green Bay Packers in the seventh round (232nd overall) of the 2023 NFL draft. He signed his rookie contract on May 5.

== NFL career statistics ==
Legend
**Bold**	Career high

=== Regular season ===
Year	Team	Games		Tackles					Interceptions						Fumbles				
Year	Team	GP	GS	Cmb	Solo	Ast	Sck	TFL	Int	Yds	Avg	Lng	TD	PD	FF	Fum	FR	Yds	TD
2023	GB	**17**	**12**	**44**	**33**	11	0.0	0	0	0	0.0	0	0	**9**	0	0	**1**	**50**	0
2024	GB	15	7	32	18	**14**	0.0	0	**2**	**51**	**25.5**	**31**	0	5	**2**	**1**	0	0	0
2025	GB	**17**	11	31	25	6	0.0	0	0	0	0	0.0	0	4	0	0	0	0	0
Career		49	30	107	76	31	0.0	0	2	51	25.5	31	0	18	2	1	1	50	0
Source: pro-football-reference.com

=== Postseason ===
Year	Team	Games		Tackles					Interceptions						Fumbles				
Year	Team	GP	GS	Cmb	Solo	Ast	Sck	TFL	Int	Yds	Avg	Lng	TD	PD	FF	Fum	FR	Yds	TD
2023	GB	**2**	**2**	**12**	**9**	**3**	0.0	0	0	0	0.0	0	0	0	0	0	0	0	0
2024	GB	1	1	5	3	2	0.0	0	0	0	0.0	0	0	0	0	0	0	0	0
2025	GB	1	1	3	3	0	0.0	0	**1**	**1**	**1.0**	**1**	0	**1**	0	0	0	0	0
Career		4	4	20	15	5	0.0	0	1	1	1.0	1	0	1	0	0	0	0	0
Source: pro-football-reference.com
