= Arron Mosby =

American football player (born 1999)

No. 53 – Green Bay Packers
- Position: Outside linebacker
- Roster status: Active

Personal information
- Born: April 13, 1999 (age 27); Fresno, California, U.S.
- Listed height: 6 ft 3 in (1.91 m)
- Listed weight: 250 lb (113 kg)

Career information
- High school: Sanger (Sanger, California)
- College: Fresno State (2017–2021)
- NFL draft: 2022: undrafted

Career history
- Carolina Panthers (2022); Green Bay Packers (2023–present)

Career NFL statistics as of Week 10, 2026
- Total tackles: 23
- Sacks: 0.5
- Pass deflections: 2
- Stats at Pro Football Reference

Arron Mosby (born April 13, 1999) is an American professional football outside linebacker for the Green Bay Packers of the National Football League (NFL). He played college football for the Fresno State Bulldogs and was signed by the Carolina Panthers as an undrafted free agent in 2022.

== Early life and education ==
Mosby was born on April 13, 1999, in Fresno, California. He attended Sanger High School and was a two-way starter, playing at wide receiver on offense and cornerback on defense. He was twice named all-league as a defensive back and was given first-team all-CMAC honors in 2016 as a senior. That year, he was named a Fresno Bee all-star.

After graduating from Sanger, Mosby committed to Fresno State University and played in every game as a true freshman, mainly as a special teamer. He made a total of five tackles in 14 games. As a sophomore in 2018, Mosby recorded 12 tackles and one interception while appearing in 13 out of 14 games. His one interception was returned 95 yards for a touchdown against San Jose State and was the fourth-longest in team history.

Mosby recorded 78 tackles as a junior in 2019, placing fourth on the squad. He appeared in all 12 games, and 40 of his tackles were solo stops. In a 2020 season shortened by COVID-19, Mosby played in all six games and recorded 21 tackles, including three for a loss. All players were given an extra year of eligibility because of the virus, and he opted to return to the team in 2021 as a fifth-year player. Playing defensive end, Mosby started 12 games out of 13 and was named an honorable mention All-Mountain West Conference. He recorded 40 tackles, six sacks, six forced fumbles, two recoveries, and a team-leading 15.5 tackles-for-loss. He was invited to the Hula Bowl and the NFLPA All-Star Game after the season ended.

== Professional career ==
Pre-draft measurables
Height	Weight	Arm length	Hand span	Wingspan	40-yard dash	10-yard split	20-yard split	20-yard shuttle	Three-cone drill	Vertical jump	Broad jump	Bench press
6 ft 3 in (1.91 m)	250 lb (113 kg)	32 1/4 in (0.82 m)	9 7/8 in (0.25 m)	6 ft 6 3/4 in (2.00 m)	4.71 s	1.67 s	2.74 s	4.75 s	7.50 s	30.0 in (0.76 m)	9 ft 1 in (2.77 m)	22 reps
All values from Pro Day

=== Carolina Panthers ===
After going unselected in the 2022 NFL draft, Mosby was signed by the Carolina Panthers as an undrafted free agent. He was waived at the final roster cuts, but was later re-signed to the practice squad. He was elevated to the active roster for their week one game against the Cleveland Browns, and their week two game against the New York Giants, and made his debut in the latter, appearing on 16 special teams snaps. He was signed to the active roster on September 21, and spent one week there before being waived on September 26, after which he was re-signed to the practice squad. He was promoted back to the active roster on October 15. He was waived on November 19 and re-signed to the practice squad. He signed a reserve/future contract on January 9, 2023. Mosby was waived by Carolina on August 1.

=== Green Bay Packers ===
On August 3, 2023, Mosby was claimed off waivers by the Green Bay Packers. He was released on August 29. A day later, he was signed to the Packers' practice squad. He signed a reserve/future contract with Green Bay on January 22, 2024.

On August 24, 2024, in the preseason finale against the Baltimore Ravens, Mosby strip-sacked rookie quarterback Devin Leary, which was recovered by teammate Anthony Johnson Jr. for a touchdown. On the very next drive, he picked off Leary on a short pass. His performance ultimately landed him a spot on the Packers' initial 53-man roster ahead of the season. Mosby made 16 appearances for Green Bay in 2024, recording 2 pass deflections, 0.5 sacks, and 12 combined tackles.

On April 8, 2025, Mosby re-signed with the Packers on an ERFA tender. He was released on August 26 as part of final roster cuts and signed to the practice squad the next day. Mosby was elevated to the active roster for Week 7 and 9 and signed to the active roster on November 4.

On March 23, 2026, Mosby re-signed with the Packers. On August 30, Mosby was released by the Packers as a part of final roster cuts. A day later, he was re–signed to the Packers' practice squad. He was elevated to the active roster for week 6 and 7.

== NFL career statistics ==
Legend
**Bold**	Career high

=== Regular season ===
Year	Team	Games		Tackles					Interceptions						Fumbles	
Year	Team	GP	GS	Cmb	Solo	Ast	Sck	Sfty	PD	Int	Yds	Avg	Lng	TD	FF	FR
2022	CAR	3	0	1	1	0	0.0	0	0	0	0	0.0	0	0	0	0
2024	GB	**16**	0	**12**	**6**	**6**	0.0	0	**2**	0	0	0.0	0	0	0	0
2025	GB	12	0	8	5	3	0.0	0	0	0	0	0.0	0	0	0	0
Total		31	0	21	12	9	0.0	0	2	0	0	0.0	0	0	0	0
Source: pro-football-reference.com

=== Postseason ===
Year	Team	Games		Tackles				Interceptions						Fumbles	
Year	Team	GP	GS	Cmb	Solo	Ast	Sck	PD	Int	Yds	Avg	Lng	TD	FF	FR
2024	GB	1	0	**1**	0	**1**	0.0	0	0	0	0.0	0	0	0	0
2025	GB	1	0	0	0	0	0.0	0	0	0	0.0	0	0	0	0
Career		2	0	1	0	1	0.0	0	0	0	0.0	0	0	0	0
Source: pro-football-reference.com
