= Benny Sapp III =

American football player (born 2000)

Profile
- Position: Safety

Personal information
- Born: June 27, 2000 (age 26); Fort Lauderdale, Florida, U.S.
- Listed height: 5 ft 11 in (1.80 m)
- Listed weight: 200 lb (91 kg)

Career information
- High school: Eden Prairie (Eden Prairie, Minnesota)
- College: Minnesota (2018–2019); Northern Iowa (2020–2022)
- NFL draft: 2023: undrafted

Career history
- Green Bay Packers (2023); Atlanta Falcons (2024)*; Saskatchewan Roughriders (2025); Calgary Stampeders (2026); Ottawa Redblacks (2026)
- * Offseason or practice squad member only

Awards and highlights
- Grey Cup champion (2025)

Career NFL statistics
- Total tackles: 2
- Stats at Pro Football Reference

Benjamin Sapp III (born June 27, 2000) is an American professional football safety. He played college football for the Minnesota Golden Gophers and Northern Iowa Panthers.

== College career ==
In Sapp's career for the Golden Gophers he played in six game notching eight total tackles. After two seasons for Minnesota, Sapp decided to transfer to play for the Northern Iowa Panthers.

== Professional career ==
Pre-draft measurables
| Height | Weight | Arm length | Hand span | 40-yard dash | 10-yard split | 20-yard split | 20-yard shuttle | Three-cone drill | Vertical jump | Broad jump | Bench press |
|---|---|---|---|---|---|---|---|---|---|---|---|
| 5 ft 11 in (1.80 m) | 200 lb (91 kg) | 30 7/8 in (0.78 m) | 9 1/8 in (0.23 m) | 4.62 s | 1.62 s | 2.63 s | 4.48 s | 7.27 s | 35.5 in (0.90 m) | 10 ft 2 in (3.10 m) | 20 reps |
All values from Pro Day

=== Green Bay Packers ===
After not being selected in the 2023 NFL draft, Sapp signed with the Green Bay Packers as an undrafted free agent. In the final preseason game versus the Seattle Seahawks, Sapp intercepeted a pass. Sapp made his NFL debut in Week 11 of the 2023 season playing eight snaps in a win over the Los Angeles Chargers. He was elevated to the active roster for Week 12 on November 22, 2023, and Week 16. Sapp was signed to the active roster on December 30. He was released on August 27, 2024.

=== Atlanta Falcons ===
On December 9, 2024, Sapp signed with the Atlanta Falcons practice squad. He signed a reserve/future contract with Atlanta on January 6, 2025. On June 2, Sapp was released by the Falcons.

=== Saskatchewan Roughriders ===
On August 19, 2025, Sapp signed with the Saskatchewan Roughriders of the Canadian Football League (CFL).

He was released by the Roughriders on May 31, 2026, as part of final roster cuts.

=== Calgary Stampeders ===
On June 23, 2026, Sapp signed with the Calgary Stampeders practice roster. He was released on July 20.

=== Ottawa Redblacks ===
On August 17, 2026, Sapp signed with the Ottawa Redblacks. On October 6, he was released.

== NFL career statistics ==
| Year | Team | Games | | Tackles | | | | | Interceptions | | | | | | Fumbles | |
| Year | Team | GP | GS | Cmb | Solo | Ast | Sck | Sfty | PD | Int | Yds | Avg | Lng | TD | FF | FR |
|---|---|---|---|---|---|---|---|---|---|---|---|---|---|---|---|---|
| 2023 | GB | 5 | 0 | 2 | 1 | 1 | 0.0 | 0 | 0 | 0 | 0 | 0.0 | 0 | 0 | 0 | 0 |
| Career | | 5 | 0 | 2 | 1 | 1 | 0.0 | 0 | 0 | 0 | 0 | 0.0 | 0 | 0 | 0 | 0 |
Source: pro-football-reference.com

== Personal life ==
He is the son of former NFL player Benny Sapp II.
