= Anthony Johnson Jr. =

American football player (born 1999)

Profile
- Position: Safety

Personal information
- Born: December 2, 1999 (age 26); St. Petersburg, Florida, U.S.
- Listed height: 6 ft 0 in (1.83 m)
- Listed weight: 205 lb (93 kg)

Career information
- High school: St. Petersburg
- College: Iowa State (2018–2022)
- NFL draft: 2023: 7th round, 242nd overall pick

Career history
- Green Bay Packers (2023); New York Giants (2024–2025); Chicago Bears (2026)*
- * Offseason or practice squad member only

Awards and highlights
- Second-team All-Big 12 (2022)

Career NFL statistics as of 2026
- Total tackles: 29
- Pass deflections: 4
- Interceptions: 1
- Stats at Pro Football Reference

Anthony Christopher Johnson Jr. (born December 2, 1999) is an American professional football safety. He played college football for the Iowa State Cyclones, and was selected by the Green Bay Packers in the 2023 NFL draft.

== Early life ==
Johnson Jr. grew up in St. Petersburg, Florida and attended St. Petersburg High School. He was rated a three-star recruit and committed to play college football at Iowa State over an offer from South Florida.

== College career ==
Johnson played cornerback for his first four seasons with the Iowa State Cyclones and became a starter during his freshman year. As a senior, he was named honorable mention All-Big 12 Conference after making 55 tackles with three tackles for loss, four passes broken up, and two forced fumbles. Johnson used the extra year of eligibility granted to college athletes due to the COVID-19 pandemic and returned to Iowa State for a fifth season. He moved to safety entering his final season. Johnson was named second team All-Big 12 after finishing the year with 60 tackles, two interceptions, and four passes broken up.

== Professional career ==
Pre-draft measurables
Height	Weight	Arm length	Hand span	Wingspan	40-yard dash	10-yard split	20-yard split	20-yard shuttle	Three-cone drill	Vertical jump	Broad jump	Bench press
5 ft 11 5/8 in (1.82 m)	205 lb (93 kg)	31 1/4 in (0.79 m)	8 3/4 in (0.22 m)	6 ft 3 7/8 in (1.93 m)	4.54 s	1.55 s	2.59 s	4.31 s	7.07 s	37.5 in (0.95 m)	10 ft 5 in (3.18 m)	12 reps
All values from NFL Combine/Pro Day

=== Green Bay Packers ===
Johnson was selected in the seventh round, 242nd overall, by the Green Bay Packers in the 2023 NFL draft. The pick had originally belonged to the Jacksonville Jaguars, but was traded to the Packers in August 2022 for offensive lineman Cole Van Lanen. Johnson signed his rookie contract on May 5.

Johnson made his NFL regular season debut in Week 7 in a 17–19 loss against the Denver Broncos. He played 15 snaps during the game, 11 of them being on special teams. Johnson made his first career start in Week 9 against the Los Angeles Rams, covering for injured safety Rudy Ford. He played every defensive snap in the game, finishing with two pass deflections, one tackle, and one interception as Green Bay went on to win 20–3.

Johnson was released as part of final roster cuts on August 27, 2024.

=== New York Giants ===
Johnson was claimed off waivers by the New York Giants on August 28, 2024. He was active for 9 games in the 2024 season, where he was primarily used as a special teams player. He would eventually record 21 snaps on defense, all of them coming in the last two games of the season.

On July 22, 2025, Johnson was waived by the Giants after a failed physical. He cleared waivers the next day, reverting to the reserve/PUP list on July 23. After spending the 2025 season on injured reserve, Johnson was released by the team on March 10, 2026.

=== Chicago Bears ===
On May 21, 2026, Johnson signed with the Chicago Bears. On August 30, he was waived by the Bears as a part of final roster cuts. Johnson was re-signed to Chicago's practice squad on September 10. He was released by the Bears on October 31.

== NFL career statistics ==
=== Regular season ===
Year	Team	Games		Tackles					Interceptions						Fumbles	
Year	Team	GP	GS	Cmb	Solo	Ast	Sck	Sfty	PD	Int	Yds	Avg	Lng	TD	FF	FR
2023	GB	12	4	24	18	6	0.0	0	3	1	1	1.0	1	0	0	0
2024	NYG	9	0	5	2	3	0.0	0	1	0	0	0	0	0	0	0
Career		21	4	29	20	9	0.0	0	4	1	1	1.0	1	0	0	0
Source: pro-football-reference.com

=== Postseason ===
Year	Team	Games		Tackles					Interceptions						Fumbles	
Year	Team	GP	GS	Cmb	Solo	Ast	Sck	Sfty	PD	Int	Yds	Avg	Lng	TD	FF	FR
2023	GB	2	0	2	2	0	0.0	0	0	0	0	.0	0	0	0	0
Career		2	0	2	2	0	0.0	0	0	0	0	.0	0	0	0	0
Source: pro-football-reference.com
