= Matthew Orzech =

American football player (born 1995)

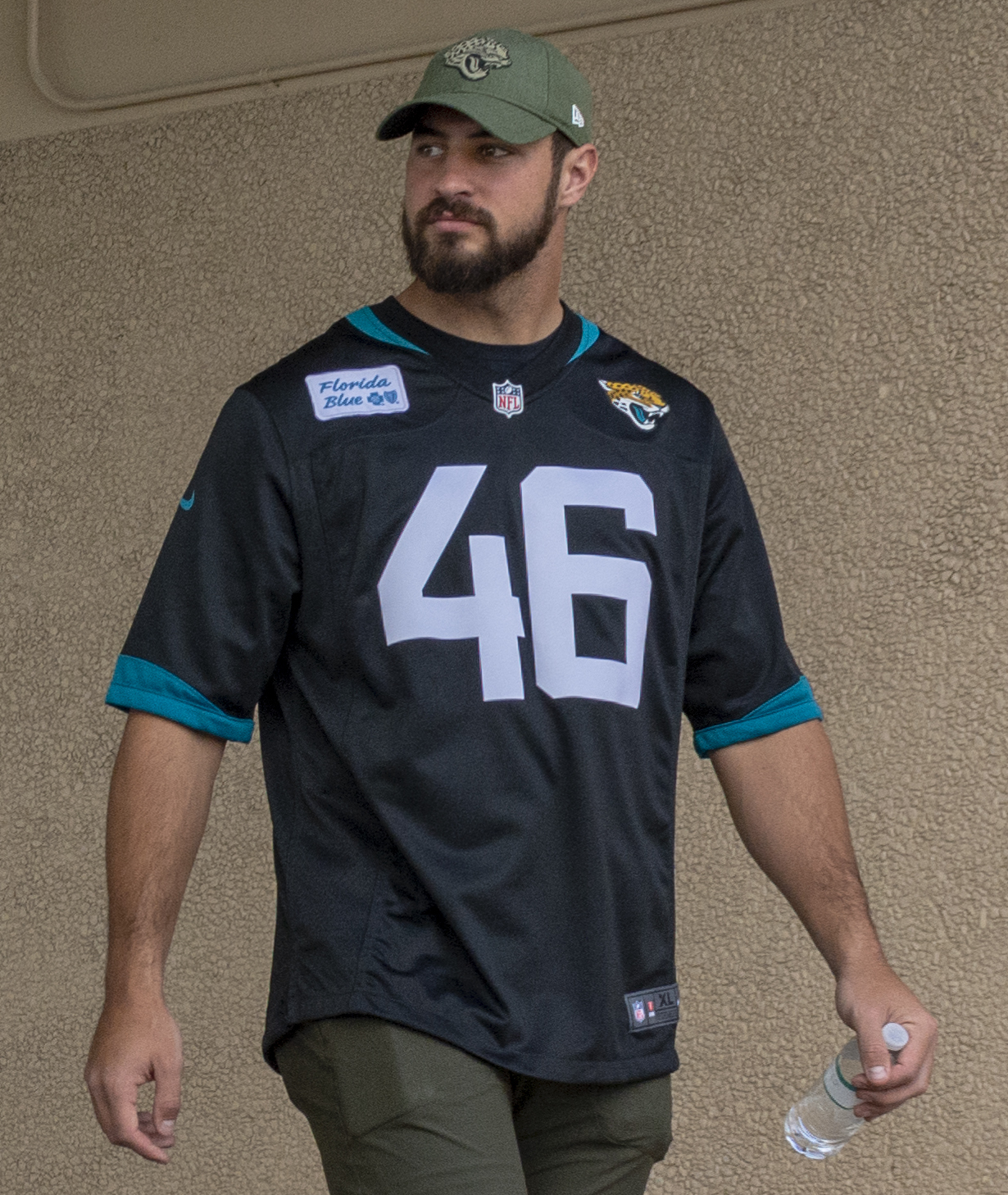
- Orzech with the Jacksonville Jaguars in 2019

No. 42 – Green Bay Packers
- Position: Long snapper
- Roster status: Active

Personal information
- Born: April 12, 1995 (age 31); San Diego, California, U.S.
- Listed height: 6 ft 3 in (1.91 m)
- Listed weight: 245 lb (111 kg)

Career information
- High school: Paloma Valley (Menifee, California)
- College: Azusa Pacific (2013–2018)
- NFL draft: 2019: undrafted

Career history
- Baltimore Ravens (2019)*; Jacksonville Jaguars (2019); Miami Dolphins (2020)*; Tennessee Titans (2020)*; Los Angeles Rams (2021–2022); Green Bay Packers (2023–present)
- * Offseason or practice squad member only

Awards and highlights
- Super Bowl champion (LVI)

Career NFL statistics as of Week 10, 2026
- Games played: 111
- Total tackles: 8
- Stats at Pro Football Reference

Matthew Robert Orzech (born April 12, 1995) is an American professional football long snapper for the Green Bay Packers of the National Football League (NFL). He played college football for the Azusa Pacific Cougars, and was signed by the Baltimore Ravens as an undrafted free agent in 2019. He has also played for the Jacksonville Jaguars, Miami Dolphins, Tennessee Titans, and the Los Angeles Rams. He became a Super Bowl champion after the Rams won Super Bowl LVI.

== Professional career ==
Pre-draft measurables
Height	Weight	Arm length	Hand span	Wingspan	40-yard dash	10-yard split	20-yard split	20-yard shuttle	Three-cone drill	Vertical jump	Broad jump	Bench press
6 ft 3 in (1.91 m)	246 lb (112 kg)	32 5/8 in (0.83 m)	10 1/4 in (0.26 m)	6 ft 7 5/8 in (2.02 m)	4.87 s	1.70 s	2.78 s	4.28 s	7.28 s	35.0 in (0.89 m)	10 ft 5 in (3.18 m)	21 reps
All values from Pro Day

=== Baltimore Ravens ===
Orzech was signed by the Baltimore Ravens as an undrafted free agent in 2019. He was waived on August 30, 2019.

=== Jacksonville Jaguars ===
On September 1, 2019, Orzech was claimed off waivers by the Jacksonville Jaguars.

On September 5, 2020, Orzech was waived by the Jaguars.

=== Miami Dolphins ===
On September 10, 2020, Orzech was signed to the practice squad of the Miami Dolphins.

=== Tennessee Titans ===
On November 5, 2020, Orzech was signed by the Tennessee Titans off the Dolphins' practice squad. Orzech was waived by the Titans on November 30, 2020, and re-signed to the practice squad two days later. He was signed to a futures contract on January 11, 2021. On May 10, 2021, Orzech was waived by the Titans.

=== Los Angeles Rams ===
Orzech was claimed off waivers by the Los Angeles Rams on May 11, 2021. Orzech became a Super Bowl champion when the Rams defeated the Cincinnati Bengals in Super Bowl LVI.

=== Green Bay Packers ===
Orzech signed with the Green Bay Packers on March 17, 2023. He was released on August 29, 2023. Two days later, he was signed by the Packers again.

On August 26, 2025, Orzech signed a three-year, $4.8 million contract extension with the Packers.
