= Elijah Hamilton =

American football player (born 1998)

Profile
- Position: Cornerback

Personal information
- Born: May 13, 1998 (age 28)
- Listed height: 6 ft 1 in (1.85 m)
- Listed weight: 211 lb (96 kg)

Career information
- High school: Blessed Trinity Catholic (Roswell, Georgia)
- College: Vanderbilt (2016-2020); Louisiana Tech (2021)
- NFL draft: 2022: undrafted

Career history
- Miami Dolphins (2022)*; St. Louis Battlehawks (2023); Green Bay Packers (2023)*; St. Louis Battlehawks (2024)*; Arlington Renegades (2024)*
- * Offseason or practice squad member only

Career XFL statistics as of 2023
- Total tackles: 13

Elijah Hamilton (born May 13, 1998) is an American professional football cornerback. He played college football at Vanderbilt University and Louisiana Tech University. He also played for the Miami Dolphins and Green Bay Packers of the National Football League (NFL).

== College career ==
Hamilton was a member of the Vanderbilt Commodores for four seasons. He finished his career at Vanderbilt with 36 Tackles in 38 games played. In 2021, Hamilton transferred to Louisiana Tech. He finished the 2021 season with 23 Tackles in 12 games played.

== Professional career ==
=== Miami Dolphins ===
After going undrafted in the 2022 NFL draft, Hamilton signed with the Miami Dolphins on April 30, 2022. He was released on August 29, 2022.

=== St. Louis Battlehawks (first stint) ===
On November 16, 2022, Hamilton was selected by the St. Louis Battlehawks of the XFL. In eight games, Hamilton recorded 13 total tackles during the 2023 XFL season. He was released from his contract on August 21, 2023.

=== Green Bay Packers ===
After the 2023 XFL season, Hamilton signed with the Green Bay Packers on August 22, 2023. He was released on August 28, 2023.

=== St. Louis Battlehawks (second stint) ===
On November 9, 2023, Hamilton re-signed with the Battlehawks. He was not part of the roster after the 2024 UFL dispersal draft on January 15, 2024.

=== Arlington Renegades ===
Hamilton signed with the Arlington Renegades of the UFL on January 29, 2024. He was released on March 10, 2024.

== Personal life ==
Hamilton is the son of former Green Bay Packers and Atlanta Falcons linebacker Ruffin Hamilton.
