= Kenneth Odumegwu =

Nigerian American football player (born 2000)

Profile
- Position: Linebacker

Personal information
- Born: 29 November 2000 (age 25); Lagos, Nigeria
- Listed height: 6 ft 6 in (1.98 m)
- Listed weight: 259 lb (117 kg)

Career information
- High school: Bright Future College (Lagos, Nigeria)
- College: National Open (Nigeria)
- NFL draft: 2023: undrafted

Career history
- Green Bay Packers (2023–2024)*; Seattle Seahawks (2024)*
- * Offseason or practice squad member only
- Stats at Pro Football Reference

Kenneth Ikechukwu Odumegwu Jr. (listern; born 29 November 2000) is a Nigerian professional American football linebacker. Born in Lagos, he attended the National Open University of Nigeria and played soccer and basketball before trying out American football in 2022. A participant of the NFL's International Player Pathway Program (IPPP), he began his professional career with the Green Bay Packers in 2023.

== Early life ==
Odumegwu was born in Lagos, Nigeria, on 29 November 2000, and grew up in Anambra State. He attended high school in Lagos at Bright Future College, then studied criminology for two years at the National Open University of Nigeria. He initially played association football (soccer) at defensive midfielder as a youth; his favorite player was Ivan Rakitić. He eventually grew too tall for the sport and switched to basketball, with his favorite player being Giannis Antetokounmpo.

Odumegwu played basketball as part of the Educational Basketball program run by Iseolupo and Olutobi Adepitan, considered one of the top developmental programs in Africa. While there, he was noticed by American football scouts sent by former National Football League (NFL) player Osi Umenyiora, who were interested by his size and physique – by 2023, Odumegwu stood at 6 feet 6 inches (1.98 m) and weighed 259 pounds (117 kg). He was offered the chance to try out American football as part of Umenyiora's academy The Uprise, designed to get Africans opportunities to play in the NFL. He was skeptical at first, recalling that "in my soccer playing days, we had some people who called themselves scouts and they'd be like: 'Ok, we liked you. You can play. How would you like to go to Europe?' It's all talk. Nothing really happens after that."

However, after being encouraged by his father to try it, as well as meeting with participant David Agoha (who later signed with the Las Vegas Raiders), Odumegwu entered the camp. Umenyiora assigned Odumegwu the position of defensive lineman. He trained at The Uprise for a month, and after impressing there, was later selected to the inaugural NFL Africa Touchdown Camp in Ghana in June 2022. At the NFL Africa Touchdown Camp, Odumegwu was one of the top performers, winning the defensive most valuable player award. For his showing there, he was named to the NFL International Combine in London, which featured 38 participants vying for spots with the NFL's International Player Pathway Program (IPPP), designed to give foreign players chances in the league.

Odumegwu posted a 4.8 second 40-yard dash and a 33.5 inch vertical jump at the combine. Of the 38 participants, he was among the 13 that performed well enough to be chosen for the IPPP. Those selected for the program trained at IMG Academy in Florida for 10 weeks, later partaking in a pro day with the University of South Florida. He was ultimately selected as one of eight IPPP players to be allocated to NFL teams, being one of six Nigerians chosen.

== Professional career ==
=== Green Bay Packers ===
Odumegwu was allocated to the Green Bay Packers through the IPPP on 4 May 2023. He became the first IPPP participant to join the Packers. Odumegwu appeared in the team's preseason win over the Cincinnati Bengals, playing 14 combined snaps (12 defense, two special teams) in his first organized football game. Afterwards, he was given the game ball by head coach Matt LaFleur. He was released at the final roster cuts on 29 August 2023, and then re-signed to the practice squad a day later while being given the IPPP exemption for international players. After having spent the entire 2023 season on the practice squad, he was signed to a reserve/future contract on 22 January 2024. He was released on 21 August 2024.

=== Seattle Seahawks ===
On 4 September 2024, Odumegwu signed with the Seattle Seahawks practice squad as an international player. He signed a reserve/future contract on 6 January 2025. On April 29, Odumegwu was waived by the Seahawks.
