= Luke Musgrave =

American football player (born 2000)

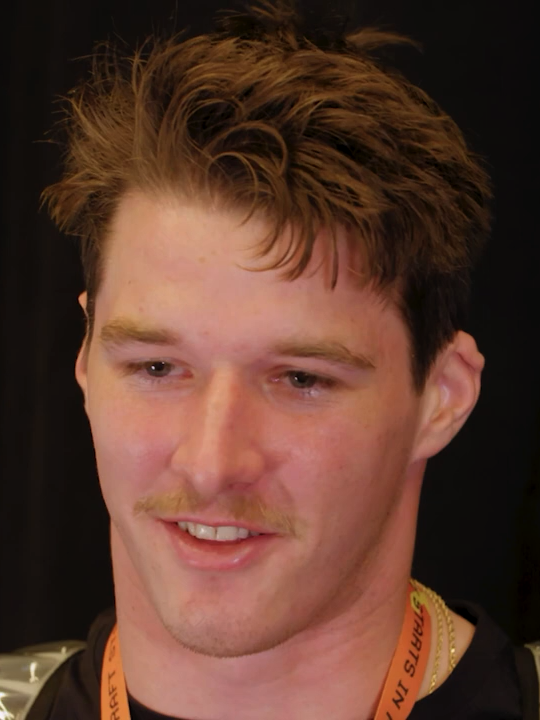
- Musgrave in 2023

No. 88 – Green Bay Packers
- Position: Tight end
- Roster status: Physically unable to perform

Personal information
- Born: September 2, 2000 (age 26); Pittsburgh, Pennsylvania, U.S.
- Listed height: 6 ft 6 in (1.98 m)
- Listed weight: 253 lb (115 kg)

Career information
- High school: Bend Senior (Bend, Oregon)
- College: Oregon State (2019–2022)
- NFL draft: 2023: 2nd round, 42nd overall pick

Career history
- Green Bay Packers (2023–present)

Career NFL statistics as of 2025
- Receptions: 65
- Receiving yards: 649
- Receiving touchdowns: 1
- Stats at Pro Football Reference

Lucas Stone Musgrave (born September 2, 2000) is an American professional football tight end for the Green Bay Packers of the National Football League (NFL). He played college football for the Oregon State Beavers. He is the nephew of football coach Bill Musgrave.

== Early life ==
Musgrave was born on September 2, 2000, and attended Bend Senior High School. He was a member of their football, lacrosse, track, and ski racing teams. As a senior, Musgrave caught 31 passes for 563 yards and four touchdowns.

== College career ==
Musgrave played in all 12 of Oregon State's games during his freshman season, catching two passes for 18 yards and making two tackles on special teams. He played in seven games with three starts in the Beavers' COVID-19 shortened 2020 season and had 12 receptions for 142 yards. Musgrave caught 22 passes for 304 yards and one touchdown during his sophomore season. He also blocked a punt and returned it 27 yards for a touchdown in a 42–34 win over Utah and was named the Pac-12 Conference Special Teams Player of the Week.

== Professional career ==
Pre-draft measurables
Height	Weight	Arm length	Hand span	Wingspan	40-yard dash	10-yard split	20-yard split	20-yard shuttle	Three-cone drill	Vertical jump	Broad jump	Bench press
6 ft 5 7/8 in (1.98 m)	253 lb (115 kg)	32 5/8 in (0.83 m)	10 3/8 in (0.26 m)	6 ft 7 1/2 in (2.02 m)	4.61 s	1.54 s	2.62 s	4.41 s	7.09 s	36.0 in (0.91 m)	10 ft 5 in (3.18 m)	19 reps
All values from NFL Combine/Pro Day

Musgrave was selected in the second round, 42nd overall, by the Green Bay Packers in the 2023 NFL draft. He signed his rookie contract on July 19.

Musgrave made his NFL debut on September 10, 2023, against the Chicago Bears, catching three passes for 50 yards in a 38–20 win. On November 19, against the Los Angeles Chargers in Week 11, Musgrave suffered a lacerated kidney during the third quarter. Musgrave continued to play through the injury but was hospitalized the same day. He was released two days later following treatment and was placed on injured reserve on November 22. Musgrave was activated on January 6, 2024.

During his first playoff start against the Dallas Cowboys, Musgrave recorded three receptions, one of them was for 38 yards and a touchdown. He finished his first playoff start with three receptions for 52 yards and a touchdown.

On October 11, 2024, the Packers placed Musgrave on injured reserve. On December 24, he was activated off injured reserve.

Musgrave began the 2026 season on the PUP list while recovering from a neck injury.

== NFL career statistics ==
Legend
**Bold**	Career high

=== Regular season ===
Year	Team	Games		Receiving					Fumbles	
Year	Team	GP	GS	Rec	Yds	Y/R	Lng	TD	Fum	Lost
2023	GB	11	9	**34**	**352**	10.4	**37**	**1**	0	0
2024	GB	7	3	7	45	6.4	19	0	0	0
2025	GB	17	10	24	252	**10.5**	26	0	**1**	0
Career		35	22	65	649	10.0	37	1	1	0
Source: pro-football-reference.com

=== Postseason ===
Year	Team	Games		Receiving					Fumbles	
Year	Team	GP	GS	Rec	Yds	Y/R	Lng	TD	Fum	Lost
2023	GB	2	1	**6**	**66**	**11.0**	**38**	**1**	0	0
2024	GB	1	0	0	0	0.0	0	0	0	0
2025	GB	1	1	1	9	9.0	9	0	0	0
Career		4	2	7	75	10.7	38	1	0	0
Source: pro-football-reference.com

== Personal life ==
Musgrave's father, Doug Musgrave, played quarterback at Oregon. His uncle, Bill Musgrave, also played quarterback at Oregon before playing and coaching in the NFL.
