= Broughton Hatcher =

American football player (born 1999)

Profile
- Position: Long snapper

Personal information
- Born: September 25, 1999 (age 27); Jefferson, South Carolina, U.S.
- Listed height: 6 ft 4 in (1.93 m)
- Listed weight: 242 lb (110 kg)

Career information
- High school: Central (Pageland, South Carolina)
- College: Old Dominion (2018–2022)
- NFL draft: 2023: undrafted

Career history
- Green Bay Packers (2023)*
- * Offseason or practice squad member only

Broughton Royce "B.R." Hatcher (born September 25, 1999) is an American former football long snapper. He played college football at Old Dominion.

== Early life ==
Hatcher grew up in Jefferson, South Carolina and attended Central High School. He was rated a two-star recruit and committed to play college football at Old Dominion.

== College career ==
During Hatcher's true freshman season in 2018, he played 11 games at long snapper. During the 2019 season, he played in 11 games at long snapper and finished the season with four total tackles (one solo stop and three assisted). The 2020 season was cancelled due to the COVID-19 pandemic. During the 2021 season, he played one game at long snapper before suffering a season-ending injury against Wake Forest and was ultimately redshirted. During the 2022 season, he played in all 12 games at long snapper and was flawless on all snaps.

== Professional career ==
Pre-draft measurables
Height	Weight	Arm length	Hand span	40-yard dash	10-yard split	20-yard split	Vertical jump
6 ft 4 in (1.93 m)	242 lb (110 kg)	31 1/2 in (0.80 m)	10 in (0.25 m)	5.02 s	1.81 s	2.84 s	32 in (0.81 m)

After not being selected in the 2023 NFL draft, Hatcher signed with the Green Bay Packers as an undrafted free agent on May 7, 2023. He was waived on August 29, 2023 after an injury but a day later, he was placed on injury reserve. He was waived from injury reserve on September 6, 2023.
