= Rudy Ford =

American football player (born 1994)

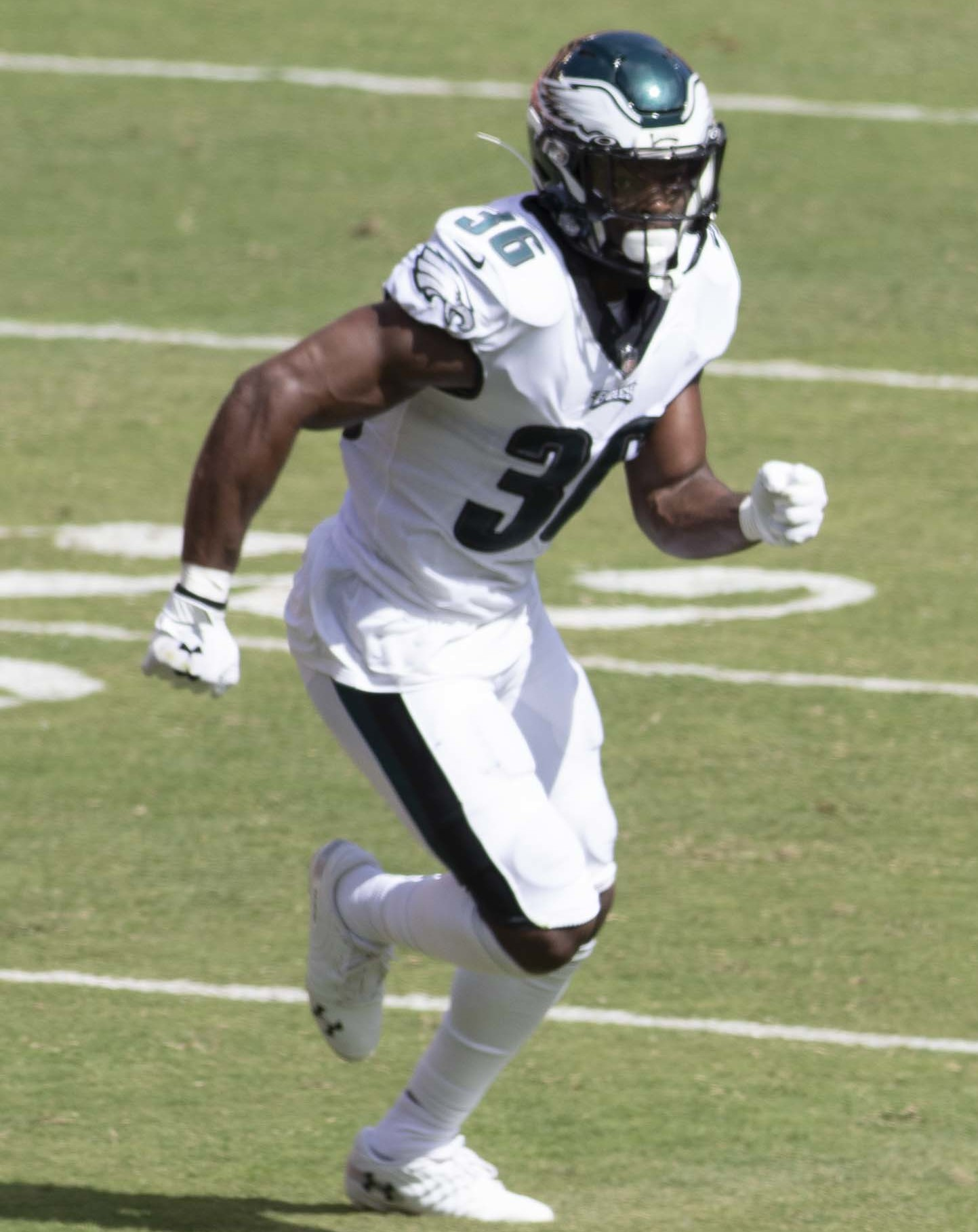
- Ford with the Philadelphia Eagles in 2020

Profile
- Position: Safety

Personal information
- Born: November 1, 1994 (age 32); Big Cove, Alabama, U.S.
- Listed height: 5 ft 11 in (1.80 m)
- Listed weight: 205 lb (93 kg)

Career information
- High school: New Hope
- College: Auburn (2013–2016)
- NFL draft: 2017: 6th round, 208th overall pick

Career history
- Arizona Cardinals (2017–2018); Philadelphia Eagles (2019–2020); Jacksonville Jaguars (2021); Green Bay Packers (2022–2023); Carolina Panthers (2024)*
- * Offseason or practice squad member only

Career NFL statistics as of 2023
- Total tackles: 203
- Sacks: 0.5
- Forced fumbles: 1
- Fumble recoveries: 2
- Pass deflections: 12
- Interceptions: 6
- Stats at Pro Football Reference

Johnathan "Rudy" Ford (born November 1, 1994) is an American professional football safety. He played college football at Auburn, and was selected by the Arizona Cardinals in the sixth round of the 2017 NFL draft. He has also played for the Philadelphia Eagles, Jacksonville Jaguars, and Green Bay Packers.

== Professional career ==
Pre-draft measurables
Height	Weight	Arm length	Hand span	Bench press
5 ft 11 1/8 in (1.81 m)	205 lb (93 kg)	30 in (0.76 m)	8 7/8 in (0.23 m)	20 reps
All values from NFL Combine

=== Arizona Cardinals ===
Ford was selected by the Arizona Cardinals in the sixth round, 208th overall, in the 2017 NFL draft. On May 14, 2017, the Cardinals signed Ford to a four-year, $2.54 million contract with a signing bonus of $140,181. He played in 10 games his rookie season as a core special teamer before suffering a knee injury. He was placed on injured reserve on December 7, 2017.

=== Philadelphia Eagles ===
On August 22, 2019, Ford was traded to the Philadelphia Eagles for defensive tackle Bruce Hector. Ford was placed on injured reserve on November 23, 2019, after suffering an abdomen injury in practice.

On October 8, 2020, Ford was placed on injured reserve after suffering a hamstring injury in Week 4. He was activated on October 31, 2020.

=== Jacksonville Jaguars ===
On March 17, 2021, Ford signed a two-year, $4.2 million contract with the Jacksonville Jaguars.

On August 29, 2022, Ford was released by the Jaguars.

=== Green Bay Packers ===
On August 31, 2022, Ford was signed by the Green Bay Packers. On March 20, 2023, Ford re-signed with the Packers. He was placed on injured reserve on January 6, 2024.

=== Carolina Panthers ===
On August 14, 2024, Ford signed with the Carolina Panthers. He was released on August 27, 2024.

== NFL career statistics ==
Legend
**Bold**	Career high

=== Regular season ===
Year	Team	Games		Tackles				Interceptions						Fumbles	
Year	Team	GP	GS	Comb	Total	Ast	Sck	PD	Int	Yds	Avg	Lng	TDs	FF	FR
2017	ARI	10	0	5	5	0	0.0	0	0	0	0.0	0	0	0	0
2018	ARI	13	1	9	7	2	0.0	0	0	0	0.0	0	0	0	0
2019	PHI	10	0	6	3	3	0.0	0	0	0	0.0	0	0	0	0
2020	PHI	8	1	13	2	1	0.0	0	0	0	0.0	0	0	0	0
2021	JAX	15	4	53	39	14	**0.5**	3	1	8	8.0	8	0	0	0
2022	GB	17	6	44	31	13	0.0	3	**3**	**87**	**29.0**	**34**	0	**1**	**1**
2023	GB	13	9	**71**	**47**	**24**	0.0	**6**	2	30	15.0	21	0	0	**1**
Career		86	21	203	145	58	0.5	12	6	125	20.8	34	0	1	2
Source: pro-football-reference.com
