= 2024 Green Bay Packers season =

106th season in franchise history

- Owner: Green Bay Packers, Inc.
- General manager: Brian Gutekunst
- Head coach: Matt LaFleur
- Offensive coordinator: Adam Stenavich
- Defensive coordinator: Jeff Hafley
- Home stadium: Lambeau Field

Results
- Record: 11–6
- Division place: 3rd NFC North
- Playoffs: Lost Wild Card Playoffs (at Eagles) 10–22
- All-Pros: FS Xavier McKinney (1st team)
- Pro Bowlers: DE Rashan Gary; RB Josh Jacobs; FS Xavier McKinney

Uniform
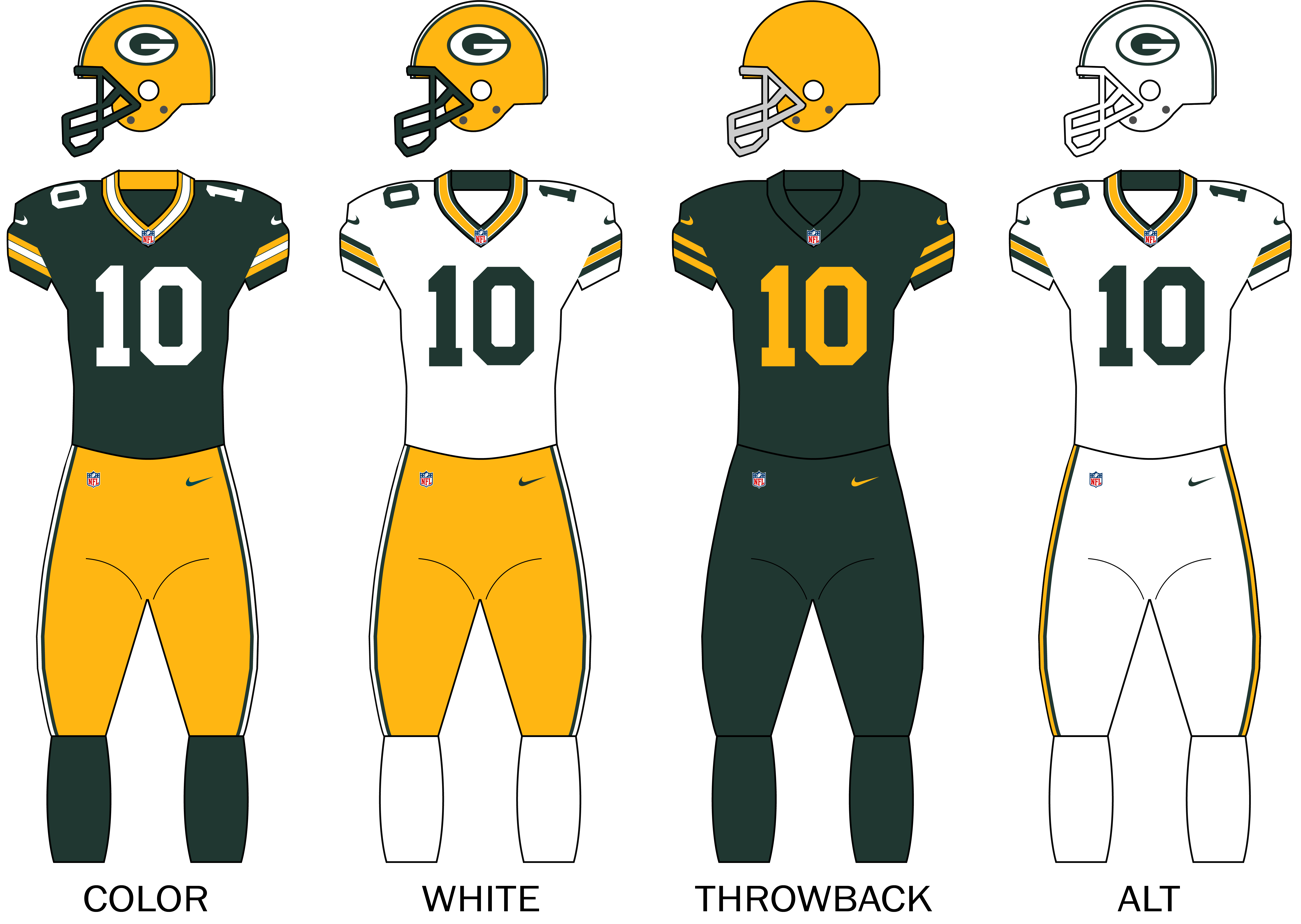

The 2024 season was the Green Bay Packers 104th in the National Football League (NFL), their 106th overall, their seventh under the leadership of general manager Brian Gutekunst and their sixth under head coach Matt LaFleur. The Packers improved upon their 9–8 record from last year following a Week 15 victory against the Seattle Seahawks on Sunday Night Football. With their Week 16 34–0 shutout win over the New Orleans Saints, the Packers clinched a Wild Card spot in the NFC Playoffs and their fifth playoff berth in six seasons under LaFleur.

The Packers became the first team in NFL history to win 800 regular season games following their Week 2 victory against the Indianapolis Colts. The Packers clinched their 37th playoff appearance in 2024, the most of any team in the league. However, the Packers finished the season 1–5 against their division, with their only win being against the Chicago Bears in Week 11, in which Karl Brooks blocked a potential game-winning 46-yarder from Cairo Santos. Unlike last year, the Packers failed to win the Wild Card round of the playoffs for the first time since 2013 when they fell to the eventual Super Bowl LIX champion Philadelphia Eagles by a score of 22–10. This was the final full season for Mark Murphy as CEO amid his looming retirement in July 2025. The Packers had an average roster age of 25.3, making them the youngest team to make the playoffs in 2024.

== Offseason ==
=== Trades ===
Date	Player incoming	Player outgoing
August 27	To Green Bay Packers; Malik Willis	To Tennessee Titans; 2025 seventh-round pick
November 5	To Green Bay Packers; 2025 seventh-round pick	To Pittsburgh Steelers; Preston Smith

=== Free agents ===
Position	Player	Free agency tag	Date signed	2024 team
CB	Corey Ballentine	UFA	March 12	Green Bay Packers
TE	Tyler Davis	UFA	March 12	Green Bay Packers
TE	Josiah Deguara	UFA	March 28	Jacksonville Jaguars
RB	A. J. Dillon	UFA	March 15	Green Bay Packers
FS	Rudy Ford	UFA	August 14	Carolina Panthers
OT	Caleb Jones	ERFA	September 3	New England Patriots
OT	Yosh Nijman	UFA	March 18	Carolina Panthers
CB	Keisean Nixon	UFA	March 15	Green Bay Packers
SS	Jonathan Owens	UFA	March 13	Chicago Bears
CB	Robert Rochell	RFA	March 19	Green Bay Packers
G	Jon Runyan Jr.	UFA	March 14	New York Giants
FS	Darnell Savage	UFA	March 13	Jacksonville Jaguars
RB	Patrick Taylor	RFA	April 8	San Francisco 49ers
ILB	Kristian Welch	UFA	August 29	Denver Broncos
P	Daniel Whelan	ERFA	March 13	Green Bay Packers
RB	Emanuel Wilson	ERFA	March 13	Green Bay Packers
ILB	Eric Wilson	UFA	March 23	Green Bay Packers

=== Additions ===
Position	Player	Former team	Date
RB	Josh Jacobs	Las Vegas Raiders	March 14
FS	Xavier McKinney	New York Giants	March 14
K	Greg Joseph	Minnesota Vikings	March 28
CB	Gemon Green	New York Giants	April 10
OT	Andre Dillard	Tennessee Titans	April 18
WR	Julian Hicks	Albany Great Danes	May 6
G	Lecitus Smith	Philadelphia Eagles	May 6
WR	Dimitri Stanley	Iowa State Cyclones	May 6
DT	Spencer Waege	San Francisco 49ers	May 13
K	James Turner	Detroit Lions	June 24
WR	Rory Starkey	Samford Bulldogs	July 19
WR	Jalen Wayne	Montreal Alouettes	July 19
QB	Jacob Eason	New York Giants	July 23
LS	Peter Bowden	Green Bay Packers	July 30
CB	Don Callis	Troy Trojans	July 30
CB	LJ Davis	Tennessee Titans	July 30
DE	Brevin Allen	Los Angeles Chargers	August 7
K	Alex Hale	Oklahoma State	August 7
DE	Zach Morton	San Antonio Brahmas	August 7
RB	Nate McCrary	Michigan Panthers	August 14
LB	Chris Russell	San Antonio Brahmas	August 14
FB	Henry Pearson	Green Bay Packers	August 20
DT	Keonte Schad	Houston Roughnecks	August 22
K	Brayden Narveson	Tennessee Titans	August 29
TE	John FitzPatrick	Atlanta Falcons	October 11
K	Brandon McManus	Washington Commanders	October 16
LS	Matt Orzech	Green Bay Packers	October 23

=== Re-signings ===
Position	Player	Date
DT	Kenny Clark	July 21
QB	Jordan Love	July 27

=== Subtractions ===
Position	Player	Date	2024 team
OT	David Bakhtiari	March 11	
RB	Aaron Jones	March 11	Minnesota Vikings
ILB	De'Vondre Campbell	March 13	San Francisco 49ers
CB	Anthony Johnson	May 6	Atlanta Falcons
DE	Deandre Johnson	May 6	
WR	Thyrick Pitts	May 6	Retired
DT	Rodney Mathews	May 9	
K	Jack Podlesny	June 19	
WR	Alex McGough	July 19	
LS	Peter Bowden	July 23	
CB	Zyon Gilbert	July 30	Pittsburgh Steelers
FB	Henry Pearson	July 30	
K	James Turner	July 30	
QB	Jacob Eason	August 5	
CB	Don Callis	August 7	
WR	Rory Starkey	August 7	
LS	Peter Bowden	August 14	
SS	Tyler Coyle	August 14	Cleveland Browns
RB	Jarveon Howard	August 20	
DE	Kenneth Odumegwu	August 21	Seattle Seahawks
K	Greg Joseph	August 28	Detroit Lions
CB	Robert Rochell	October 7	Green Bay Packers
K	Brayden Narveson	October 16	
LS	Matt Orzech	October 21	Green Bay Packers
DT	Jonathan Ford	October 23	

=== Draft ===
2024 Green Bay Packers draft selections
Round	Selection	Player	Position	College	Notes
1	25	Jordan Morgan	Offensive tackle	Arizona	
2	41	Traded to the New Orleans Saints (Note: The Packers traded a second-round selection (41st overall) to the New Orleans Saints in exchange for second-, fifth- and sixth-round selections (45th, 168th and 190th overall).)			From Jets (Note: The Packers traded 2023 first- and fifth-round selections (15th and 170th overall), and QB Aaron Rodgers to the New York Jets in exchange for a second-round selection (41st overall), and 2023 first-, second- and sixth-round selections (13th, 42nd and 207th overall).)
2	45	Edgerrin Cooper	Linebacker	Texas A&M	From Saints
2	58	Javon Bullard	Safety	Georgia	
3	88	MarShawn Lloyd	Running back	USC	
3	91	Ty'Ron Hopper	Linebacker	Missouri	From Bills (Note: The Packers traded a fifth-round selection (159th overall) and CB Rasul Douglas to the Buffalo Bills in exchange for a third-round selection (91st overall).)
4	111	Evan Williams	Safety	Oregon	From Jets (Note: The Packers traded fourth- and sixth-round selections (126th and 190th overall) to the New York Jets in exchange for a fourth-round selection (111th overall).)
4	126	Traded to the New York Jets			
5	160	Traded to the Buffalo Bills			
5	163	Jacob Monk	Center	Duke	From Bills (Note: The Packers traded fifth- and sixth-round selections (168th and 219th overall) to the Buffalo Bills in exchange for a fifth-round selection (163rd overall).)
5	168	Traded to the Buffalo Bills			From Saints
5	169	Kitan Oladapo	Safety	Oregon State	Compensatory pick
6	190	Traded to the New York Jets			From Saints
6	202	Travis Glover	Offensive tackle	Georgia State	
6	219	Traded to the Buffalo Bills			
7	245	Michael Pratt	Quarterback	Tulane	
7	255	Kalen King	Cornerback	Penn State	Compensatory pick

Draft trades

=== Undrafted free agents signing ===
2024 Green Bay Packers undrafted free agents
Name	Position	College	Ref.
Peter Bowden	LS	Wisconsin	
James Ester	DT	Northern Illinois	
Ralen Goforth	LB	Washington	
Jarveon Howard	RB	Alcorn State	
Donovan Jennings	G	South Florida	
Trente Jones	OT	Michigan	
Rodney Matthews	DT	Ohio	
Messiah Swinson	TE	Arizona State	
Julian Hicks	WR	Albany	
Dimitri Stanley	WR	Iowa State	
Don Callis	CB	Troy	
Alex Hale	PK	Oklahoma State	

=== Roster cuts ===
The roster was cut to 53 on August 27, 2024.

Position	Player	2024 team
DE	Deslin Alexandre	Green Bay Packers (Practice squad)
DE	Brevin Allen	New England Patriots (Practice squad)
DE	Keshawn Banks	New England Patriots (Practice squad)
K	Anders Carlson	San Francisco 49ers/New York Jets
QB	Sean Clifford	Green Bay Packers (Practice squad)
WR	Grant DuBose	Miami Dolphins
DT	James Ester	Green Bay Packers (Practice squad)
CB	Gemon Green	
K	Alex Hale	Green Bay Packers (Practice squad)
WR	Julian Hicks	Green Bay Packers (Practice squad)
G	Donovan Jennings	Green Bay Packers (Practice squad)
S	Anthony Johnson Jr.	New York Giants
OT	Caleb Jones	New England Patriots
CB	Kalen King	Green Bay Packers (Practice squad)
RB	Nate McCrary	Green Bay Packers (Practice squad)
RB	Ellis Merriweather	Green Bay Packers (Practice squad)
DE	Zach Morton	
G	Royce Newman	Tampa Bay Buccaneers
TE	Henry Pearson	
QB	Michael Pratt	Tampa Bay Buccaneers (Practice squad)
CB	Robert Rochell	Green Bay Packers
LB	Chris Russell	Green Bay Packers (Practice squad)
S	Benny Sapp III	
DT	Keonte Schad	
G	Lecitus Smith	New England Patriots
WR	Dimitri Stanley	
TE	Messiah Swinson	Carolina Panthers and Green Bay Packers (Practice squad)
OT	Luke Tenuta	Arizona Cardinals (Practice squad)
WR	Samori Toure	Chicago Bears (Practice squad)
DT	Spencer Waege	
WR	Jalen Wayne	Green Bay Packers (Practice Squad)
MLB	Kristian Welch	Denver Broncos/Baltimore Ravens
TE	Joel Wilson	Chicago Bears (Practice squad)
LB	Christian Young	

== Staff ==
2024 Green Bay Packers staff
Front office: Owner: Publicly held corporation; Executive committee – Board of directors; President/CEO – Mark Murphy; COO – Ed Policy; General manager – Brian Gutekunst; Executive vice president/director of football operations – Russ Ball; Vice president of player personnel – Jon-Eric Sullivan; Director of player personnel – John Wojciechowski; Director of football operations – Milt Hendrickson; Director of college scouting – Matt Malaspina; Assistant director of college scouting – Patrick Moore; Director of pro personnel – Richmond Williams; Director of football administration – Melaine Marohl; National scout – Sam Seale; Director of performance psychology/team behavioral health clinician – Chris Carr; Director of player engagement – Grey Ruegamer; Player personnel executive – Lee Gissendaner; Head coaches: Head coach – Matt LaFleur; Assistant head coach/special teams coordinator – Rich Bisaccia; Offensive coaches: Offensive coordinator – Adam Stenavich; Passing game coordinator – Jason Vrable; Quarterbacks – Tom Clements; Assistant quarterbacks – Connor Lewis; Running backs – Ben Sirmans; Wide receivers – Ryan Mahaffey; Tight ends – John Dunn; Offensive line – Luke Butkus; Assistant offensive line – Eddie Gordon; Offensive assistant – Sean Mannion; Coaching assistant – Myles White; Offensive quality control – Rob Grosso	Defensive coaches: Defensive coordinator – Jeff Hafley; Defensive line – Jason Rebrovich; Assistant defensive line – Vince Oghobaase; Linebackers/running game coordinator – Anthony Campanile; Passing game coordinator – Derrick Ansley; Defensive backs – Ryan Downard; Defensive assistant – Sean Duggan; Defensive quality control – Wendel Davis; Defensive quality control – Anthony Perkins; Special teams coaches: Assistant special teams – Byron Storer; Special teams quality control – Kyle Wilber; Strength and conditioning: Strength and conditioning coordinator – Aaron Hill; Strength and conditioning assistant – Marcus Jones; Strength and conditioning assistant – Ben Schumacher; Strength and conditioning assistant – Todd Hunt

== Final roster ==
2024 Green Bay Packers roster
Quarterbacks (QB): 6 Sean Clifford; 10 Jordan Love; 2 Malik Willis; Running backs (RB): 30 Chris Brooks; 8 Josh Jacobs; 31 Emanuel Wilson; Wide receivers (WR): 87 Romeo Doubs; 18 Malik Heath; 80 Bo Melton; 11 Jayden Reed; 9 Christian Watson; 13 Dontayvion Wicks; Tight ends (TE): 86 John FitzPatrick; 85 Tucker Kraft; 88 Luke Musgrave; 89 Ben Sims	Offensive linemen (OL): 73 Andre Dillard T; 79 Travis Glover T; 74 Elgton Jenkins G/C; 62 Jacob Monk C/G; 71 Josh Myers C; 75 Sean Rhyan G; 77 Kadeem Telfort T; 50 Zach Tom T; 63 Rasheed Walker T; Defensive linemen (DL): 94 Karl Brooks DT; 97 Kenny Clark DT; 57 Brenton Cox Jr. DE; 55 Kingsley Enagbare DE; 52 Rashan Gary DE; 53 Arron Mosby DE; 93 Tedarrell Slaton DT; 90 Lukas Van Ness DE; 96 Colby Wooden DE; 95 Devonte Wyatt DT	Linebackers (LB): 56 Edgerrin Cooper OLB/MLB; 59 Ty'Ron Hopper OLB; 58 Isaiah McDuffie OLB; 7 Quay Walker OLB; 45 Eric Wilson MLB; Defensive backs (DB): 39 Zayne Anderson SS; 35 Corey Ballentine CB; 20 Javon Bullard SS; 29 Xavier McKinney FS; 25 Keisean Nixon CB; 27 Kitan Oladapo FS; 22 Robert Rochell CB; 21 Eric Stokes CB; 24 Carrington Valentine CB; 33 Evan Williams SS; Special teams (ST): 17 Brandon McManus K; 42 Matthew Orzech LS; 19 Daniel Whelan P	Practice squad: 49 Deslin Alexandre DE; 54 Michael Barrett MLB; 40 Omar Brown SS; 65 James Ester DT; 35 Deshaun Fenwick RB; 36 Kamal Hadden CB; 16 Alex Hale K (IPP); 78 Marquis Hayes G; 81 Julian Hicks WR; 67 Donovan Jennings G; 83 Cornelius Johnson WR; 70 Michael Jordan G; 34 Kalen King CB; 51 Jeremiah Martin DE; 16 Alex McGough WR; 38 Ellis Merriweather RB (PS/I); 48 Messiah Swinson TE; Reserve: 23 Jaire Alexander CB (IR); 84 Tyler Davis TE (IR); 28 A. J. Dillon RB (IR); 32 MarShawn Lloyd RB (IR); 77 Jordan Morgan G (IR); Rookies in italics 53 active, 5 reserve, 16 practice squad (1 exempt)

== Preseason ==
The Packers' preseason opponents and preliminary schedule was announced on May 15, in conjunction with the release of the regular season schedule.

Week	Date	Opponent	Result	Record	Venue	Recap
1	August 10	at Cleveland Browns	W 23–10	1–0	Cleveland Browns Stadium	Recap
2	August 18	at Denver Broncos	L 2–27	1–1	Empower Field at Mile High	Recap
3	August 24	Baltimore Ravens	W 30–7	2–1	Lambeau Field	Recap

== Regular season ==
On April 10, the NFL announced that the Packers will open the season against the Philadelphia Eagles at Arena Corinthians in São Paulo, Brazil, in the first NFL game in South America.

The remainder of the Packers' 2024 schedule, with exact dates and times, was announced on May 15.

=== Schedule ===
Week	Date	Opponent	Result	Record	Venue	Recap
1	September 6	at Philadelphia Eagles	**L** 29–34	0–1	(Brazil) Arena Corinthians (São Paulo)	Recap
2	September 15	Indianapolis Colts	**W** 16–10	1–1	Lambeau Field	Recap
3	September 22	at Tennessee Titans	**W** 30–14	2–1	Nissan Stadium	Recap
4	September 29	**Minnesota Vikings**	**L** 29–31	2–2	Lambeau Field	Recap
5	October 6	at Los Angeles Rams	**W** 24–19	3–2	SoFi Stadium	Recap
6	October 13	Arizona Cardinals	**W** 34–13	4–2	Lambeau Field	Recap
7	October 20	Houston Texans	**W** 24–22	5–2	Lambeau Field	Recap
8	October 27	at Jacksonville Jaguars	**W** 30–27	6–2	EverBank Stadium	Recap
9	November 3	**Detroit Lions**	**L** 14–24	6–3	Lambeau Field	Recap
10	Bye					
11	November 17	at **Chicago Bears**	**W** 20–19	7–3	Soldier Field	Recap
12	November 24	San Francisco 49ers	**W** 38–10	8–3	Lambeau Field	Recap
13	November 28	Miami Dolphins	**W** 30–17	9–3	Lambeau Field	Recap
14	December 5	at **Detroit Lions**	**L** 31–34	9–4	Ford Field	Recap
15	December 15	at Seattle Seahawks	**W** 30–13	10–4	Lumen Field	Recap
16	December 23	New Orleans Saints	**W** 34–0	11–4	Lambeau Field	Recap
17	December 29	at **Minnesota Vikings**	**L** 25–27	11–5	U.S. Bank Stadium	Recap
18	January 5	**Chicago Bears**	**L** 22–24	11–6	Lambeau Field	Recap

Note: Intra-division opponents are in bold text.

=== Game summaries ===
==== Week 1: at Philadelphia Eagles ====
Week 1: Green Bay Packers at Philadelphia Eagles – Game summary

Quarter	1	2	3	4	Total
Packers	6	13	7	3	**29**
**Eagles**	0	17	14	3	**34**

at Arena Corinthians, São Paulo, Brazil

- Date: September 6
- Game time: 9:15 p.m. BRT/7:15 p.m. CDT
- Game weather: 63 °F (17 °C)
- Game attendance: 47,236
- Referee: Ronald Torbert
- TV announcers (NBC): Noah Eagle, Todd Blackledge and Kaylee Hartung
  Game exclusive to WGBA, WTMJ, and WCAU, was available on Peacock out of market.
- Recap, Game Book

Game information

**First quarter**

- GB – Brayden Narveson 31-yard field goal, 8:26. Packers 3–0. **Drive: 5 plays, 6 yards, 2:20.**
- GB – Brayden Narveson 26-yard field goal, 3:01. Packers 6–0. **Drive: 8 plays, 8 yards, 4:05.**

**Second quarter**

- PHI – Saquon Barkley 18-yard pass from Jalen Hurts (Jake Elliott kick), 12:38. Eagles 7–6. **Drive: 11 plays, 70 yards, 5:23.**
- GB – Jayden Reed 33-yard run (run failed), 10:16. Packers 12–7. **Drive: 5 plays, 70 yards, 2:22.**
- PHI – Saquon Barkley 11-yard run (Jake Elliott kick), 5:34. Eagles 14–12. **Drive: 9 plays, 70 yards, 4:42.**
- GB – Jayden Reed 70-yard pass from Jordan Love (Brayden Narveson kick), 5:11. Packers 19–14. **Drive: 3 plays, 70 yards, 0:23.**
- PHI – Jake Elliott 38-yard field goal, 0:00. Packers 19–17. **Drive: 15 plays, 57 yards, 5:11.**

**Third quarter**

- PHI – A. J. Brown 67-yard pass from Jalen Hurts (Jake Elliot kick), 14:09. Eagles 24–19. Drive: 2 plays, 70 yards, 0:51.
- GB – Christian Watson 2-yard pass from Jordan Love (Brayden Narveson kick), 11:55. Packers 26–24. **Drive: 6 plays, 70 yards, 2:14.**
- PHI – Saquon Barkley 2-yard run (Jake Elliott kick), 4:26. Eagles 31–26. **Drive: 4 plays, 24 yards, 1:42.**

**Fourth quarter**

- GB – Brayden Narveson 26-yard field goal, 7:52. Eagles 31–29. **Drive: 10 plays, 79 yards, 5:01.**
- PHI – Jake Elliott 21-yard field goal, 0:27. Eagles 34–29. **Drive: 16 plays, 67 yards, 7:25.**

**Top passers**

- GB – Jordan Love – 17/34, 260 yards, 2 TD, INT
- PHI – Jalen Hurts – 20/34, 278 yards, 2 TD, 2 INT

**Top rushers**

- GB – Josh Jacobs – 16 rushes, 84 yards
- PHI – Saquon Barkley – 24 rushes, 109 yards, 2 TD

**Top receivers**

- GB – Jayden Reed – 4 receptions, 138 yards, TD
- PHI – A. J. Brown – 5 receptions, 119 yards, TD

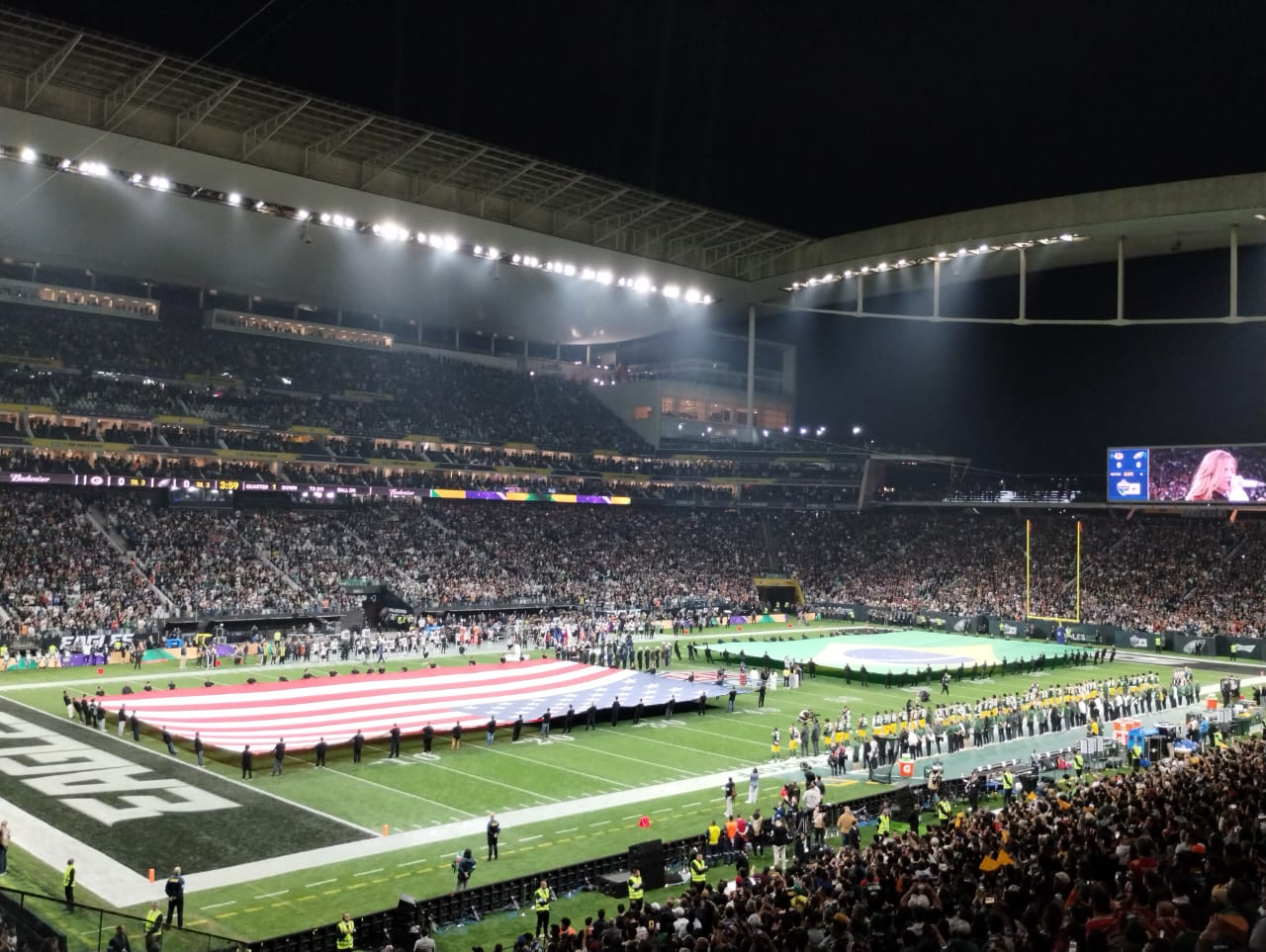
Packers and Eagles in Brazil

Despite Green Bay forcing two turnovers off Jalen Hurts deep in Philadelphia territory in the first quarter, the Packers were held to field goals both times, resulting in a 6–0 lead after the first quarter. Following a back and forth second and third quarter, the Packers found themselves down 31–26 with the Eagles having the ball deep in Packers territory, however Jaire Alexander intercepted Hurts to give the Packers a chance to reclaim the lead. However, the Packers were forced to settle for a field goal with just under 8 minutes left to cut the lead to 31–29. The Eagles then drained all but the remaining 27 seconds off the clock before kicking a field goal to extend the lead to 34–29, which was the final score. On the Packers' final drive, Jordan Love suffered an MCL sprain, causing him to miss the next two games of the season.

==== Week 2: vs. Indianapolis Colts ====
Week 2: Indianapolis Colts at Green Bay Packers – Game summary

Quarter	1	2	3	4	Total
Colts	0	0	3	7	**10**
**Packers**	10	0	3	3	**16**

at Lambeau Field, Green Bay, Wisconsin

- Date: September 15
- Game time: 12:00 p.m. CDT
- Game weather: Sunny, 85 °F (29 °C)
- Game attendance: 77,827
- Referee: Shawn Hochuli
- TV announcers (Fox): Joe Davis, Greg Olsen and Pam Oliver
- Recap, Game Book

Game information

**First quarter**

- GB – Brayden Narveson 46-yard field goal, 10:30. Packers 3–0. **Drive: 8 plays, 42 yards, 4:30.**
- GB – Dontayvion Wicks 14-yard pass from Malik Willis (Brayden Narveson kick), 3:18. Packers 10–0. **Drive: 11 plays, 82 yards, 6:21.**

**Second quarter**

- No scoring plays.

**Third quarter**

- GB – Brayden Narveson 42-yard field goal, 8:25. Packers 13–0. **Drive: 7 plays, 23 yards, 3:55.**
- IND – Matt Gay 34-yard field goal, 4:32. Packers 13–3. **Drive: 7 plays, 54 yards, 3:53.**

**Fourth quarter**

- GB – Brayden Narveson 34-yard field goal, 10:50. Packers 16–3. **Drive: 7 plays, 44 yards, 3:22.**
- IND – Alec Pierce 4-yard pass from Anthony Richardson (Matt Gay kick), 1:47. Packers 16–10. **Drive: 12 plays, 65 yards, 2:23.**

**Top passers**

- IND – Anthony Richardson – 17/34, 204 yards, TD, 3 INT
- GB – Malik Willis – 12/14, 122 yards, TD

**Top rushers**

- IND – Jonathan Taylor – 12 rushes, 103 yards
- GB – Josh Jacobs – 32 rushes, 151 yards

**Top receivers**

- IND – Alec Pierce – 5 receptions, 56 yards, TD
- GB – Romeo Doubs – 3 receptions, 62 yards

The Packers were able to defeat the Colts 16–10, despite Jordan Love missing the game with his leg injury. The Packers also avoided what would have been their first 0–2 start since 2006; they have the longest active streak in the league of avoiding an 0–2 start.

==== Week 3: at Tennessee Titans ====
Week 3: Green Bay Packers at Tennessee Titans – Game summary

Quarter	1	2	3	4	Total
**Packers**	17	3	7	3	**30**
Titans	7	0	7	0	**14**

at Nissan Stadium, Nashville, Tennessee

- Date: September 22
- Game time: 12:00 p.m. CDT
- Game weather: Cloudy, 87 °F (31 °C)
- Game attendance: 67,322
- Referee: Clay Martin
- TV announcers (Fox): Kevin Kugler, Daryl Johnston and Laura Okmin
- Recap, Game Book

Game information

**First quarter**

- GB – Malik Willis 5-yard run (Brayden Narveson kick), 12:25. Packers 7–0. **Drive: 6 plays, 70 yards, 2:35.**
- TEN – Nick Vannett 1-yard pass from Will Levis (Nick Folk kick), 7:15. Tied 7–7. **Drive: 10 plays, 70 yards, 5:10.**
- GB – Brayden Narveson 21-yard field goal, 1:05. Packers 10–7. **Drive: 11 plays, 67 yards, 6:10.**
- GB – Jaire Alexander 35-yard interception return (Brayden Narveson kick), 0:51. Packers 17–7.

**Second quarter**

- GB – Brayden Narveson 26-yard field goal, 0:00. Packers 20–7. **Drive: 12 plays, 67 yards, 6:02.**

**Third quarter**

- GB – Emanuel Wilson 30-yard pass from Malik Willis (Brayden Narveson kick), 8:25. Packers 27–7. **Drive: 5 plays, 36 yards, 3:13.**
- TEN – DeAndre Hopkins 11-yard pass from Will Levis (Nick Folk kick), 4:55. Packers 27–14. **Drive: 7 plays, 68 yards, 3:30.**

**Fourth quarter**

- GB – Brayden Narveson 47-yard field goal, 3:29. Packers 30–14. **Drive: 8 plays, 31 yards, 3:11.**

**Top passers**

- GB – Malik Willis – 13/19, 202 yards, TD
- TEN – Will Levis – 26/34, 260 yards, 2 TD, 2 INT

**Top rushers**

- GB – Malik Willis – 6 rushes, 73 yards, TD
- TEN – Tony Pollard – 6 rushes, 14 yards

**Top receivers**

- GB – Christian Watson – 2 receptions, 67 yards
- TEN – DeAndre Hopkins – 6 receptions, 73 yards, TD

==== Week 4: vs. Minnesota Vikings ====
Week 4: Minnesota Vikings at Green Bay Packers – Game summary

Quarter	1	2	3	4	Total
**Vikings**	14	14	0	3	**31**
Packers	0	7	0	22	**29**

at Lambeau Field, Green Bay, Wisconsin

- Date: September 29
- Game time: 12:00 p.m. CDT
- Game weather: Sunny, 71 °F (22 °C)
- Game attendance: 78,335
- Referee: Bill Vinovich
- TV announcers (CBS): Kevin Harlan, Trent Green and Melanie Collins
- Recap, Game Book

Game information

**First quarter**

- MIN – Jordan Addison 29-yard pass from Sam Darnold (Will Reichard kick), 11:53. Vikings 7–0. **Drive: 6 plays, 73 yards, 3:07.**
- MIN – Josh Oliver 2-yard pass from Sam Darnold (Will Reichard kick), 1:37. Vikings 14–0. **Drive: 8 plays, 73 yards, 5:10.**

**Second quarter**

- MIN – Jordan Addison 7-yard run (Will Reichard kick), 11:50. Vikings 21–0. **Drive: 7 plays, 46 yards, 3:30.**
- MIN – Justin Jefferson 14-yard pass from Sam Darnold (Will Reichard kick), 5:28. Vikings 28–0. **Drive: 1 play, 4 yards, 0:27.**
- GB – Jayden Reed 15-yard pass from Jordan Love (Brayden Narveson kick), 0:15. Vikings 28–7. **Drive: 2 plays, 3 yards, 0:24.**

**Third quarter**

- No scoring plays.

**Fourth quarter**

- GB – Dontayvion Wicks 6-yard pass from Jordan Love (Brayden Narveson kick), 11:38. Vikings 28–14. **Drive: 11 plays, 89 yards, 3:55.**
- GB – Tucker Kraft 13-yard pass from Jordan Love (Jordan Love–Tucker Kraft pass), 10:16. Vikings 28–22. **Drive: 2 plays, 20 yards, 0:27.**
- MIN – Will Reichard 33-yard field goal, 6:50. Vikings 31–22. **Drive: 7 plays, 55 yards, 3:26.**
- GB – Dontayvion Wicks 17-yard pass from Jordan Love (Brayden Narveson kick), 0:56. Vikings 31–29. **Drive: 5 plays, 96 yards, 1:22.**

**Top passers**

- MIN – Sam Darnold – 20/28, 275 yards, 3 TD, INT
- GB – Jordan Love – 32/54, 389 yards, 4 TD, 3 INT

**Top rushers**

- MIN – Aaron Jones – 22 rushes, 93 yards
- GB – Josh Jacobs – 9 rushes, 51 yards

**Top receivers**

- MIN – Justin Jefferson – 6 receptions, 85 yards, TD
- GB – Jayden Reed – 7 receptions, 139 yards, TD

Down 28–7, the Packers would outscore the Vikings 22–3 in the 4th quarter. However, the Vikings would hang on to win 31–29 and drop the Packers 2–2.

==== Week 5: at Los Angeles Rams ====
Week 5: Green Bay Packers at Los Angeles Rams – Game summary

Quarter	1	2	3	4	Total
**Packers**	7	3	14	0	**24**
Rams	0	13	0	6	**19**

at SoFi Stadium, Inglewood, California

- Date: October 6
- Game time: 3:25 p.m. CDT/1:25 p.m. PDT
- Game weather: Sunny, 73 °F (23 °C) (fixed roof)
- Game attendance: 72,842
- Referee: Brad Allen
- TV announcers (CBS): Jim Nantz, Tony Romo and Tracy Wolfson
- Recap, Game Book

Game information

**First quarter**

- GB – Josh Jacobs 2-yard run (Brayden Narveson kick), 6:52. Packers 7–0. **Drive: 9 plays, 96 yards, 5:05.**

**Second quarter**

- LAR – Kyren Williams 1-yard run (Joshua Karty kick), 9:47. Tied 7–7. **Drive: 13 plays, 55 yards, 7:10.**
- LAR – Jaylen McCollough 4-yard interception return (kick blocked), 2:02. Rams 13–7.
- GB – Brayden Narveson 46-yard field goal, 0:00. Rams 13–10. **Drive: 9 plays, 42 yards, 2:02.**

**Third quarter**

- GB – Tucker Kraft 66-yard pass from Jordan Love (Brayden Narveson kick), 11:15. Packers 17–13. **Drive: 2 plays, 70 yards, 0:43.**
- GB – Tucker Kraft 7-yard pass from Jordan Love (Brayden Narveson kick), 4:00. Packers 24–13. **Drive: 7 plays, 54 yards, 4:06.**

**Fourth quarter**

- LAR – Demarcus Robinson 1-yard pass from Matthew Stafford (run failed), 3:30. Packers 24–19. **Drive: 11 plays, 91 yards, 2:32.**

**Top passers**

- GB – Jordan Love – 15/26, 224 yards, 2 TD, INT
- LAR – Matthew Stafford – 29/45, 260 yards, TD, INT

**Top rushers**

- GB – Josh Jacobs – 19 rushes, 73 yards, TD
- LAR – Kyren Williams – 22 rushes, 102 yards, TD

**Top receivers**

- GB – Tucker Kraft – 4 receptions, 88 yards, 2 TD
- LAR – Jordan Whittington – 7 receptions, 89 yards

The Packers defeated the Rams for the fifth straight game (including playoffs).

==== Week 6: vs. Arizona Cardinals ====
Week 6: Arizona Cardinals at Green Bay Packers – Game summary

Quarter	1	2	3	4	Total
Cardinals	0	10	3	0	**13**
**Packers**	7	17	7	3	**34**

at Lambeau Field, Green Bay, Wisconsin

- Date: October 13
- Game time: 12:00 p.m. CDT
- Game weather: Rain, 50 °F (10 °C)
- Game attendance: 77,773
- Referee: Alex Kemp
- TV announcers (Fox): Kevin Kugler, Daryl Johnston and Laura Okmin
- Recap, Game Book

Game information

**First quarter**

- GB – Jayden Reed 5-yard pass from Jordan Love (Brayden Narveson kick), 8:55. Packers 7–0. **Drive: 5 plays, 44 yards, 2:31.**

**Second quarter**

- GB – Romeo Doubs 10-yard pass from Jordan Love (Brayden Narveson kick), 14:55. Packers 14–0. **Drive: 11 plays, 80 yards, 6:42.**
- GB – Brayden Narveson 36-yard field goal, 6:32. Packers 17–0. **Drive: 12 plays, 72 yards, 6:48.**
- GB – Christian Watson 44-yard pass from Jordan Love (Brayden Narveson kick), 4:32. Packers 24–0. **Drive: 1 play, 44 yards, 0:07.**
- ARI – Michael Wilson 18-yard pass from Kyler Murray (Chad Ryland kick), 1:56. Packers 24–7. **Drive: 6 plays, 70 yards, 2:36.**
- ARI – Chad Ryland 38-yard field goal, 0:04. Packers 24–10. **Drive: 9 plays, 25 yards, 1:00.**

**Third quarter**

- ARI – Chad Ryland 40-yard field goal, 9:03. Packers 24–13. **Drive: 9 plays, 53 yards, 5:57.**
- GB – Romeo Doubs 20-yard pass from Jordan Love (Brayden Narveson kick), 3:48. Packers 31–13. **Drive: 9 plays, 70 yards, 5:15.**

**Fourth quarter**

- GB – Brayden Narveson 41-yard field goal, 9:28. Packers 34–13. **Drive: 12 plays, 56 yards, 5:44.**

**Top passers**

- ARI – Kyler Murray – 22/32, 214 yards, TD
- GB – Jordan Love – 22/32, 258 yards, 4 TD, INT

**Top rushers**

- ARI – Trey Benson – 5 rushes, 26 yards
- GB – Josh Jacobs – 18 rushes, 62 yards

**Top receivers**

- ARI – Trey McBride – 8 receptions, 96 yards
- GB – Christian Watson – 3 receptions, 68 yards, TD

==== Week 7: vs. Houston Texans ====
Week 7: Houston Texans at Green Bay Packers – Game summary

Quarter	1	2	3	4	Total
Texans	3	16	0	3	**22**
**Packers**	0	14	7	3	**24**

at Lambeau Field, Green Bay, Wisconsin

- Date: October 20
- Game time: 12:00 p.m. CDT
- Game weather: Sunny, 70 °F (21 °C)
- Game attendance: 78,197
- Referee: Scott Novak
- TV announcers (CBS): Jim Nantz, Tony Romo and Tracy Wolfson
- Recap, Game Book

Game information

**First quarter**

- HOU – Kaʻimi Fairbairn 23-yard field goal, 11:48. Texans 3–0. **Drive: 4 plays, 6 yards, 1:00.**

**Second quarter**

- GB – Tucker Kraft 14-yard pass from Jordan Love (Brandon McManus kick), 13:16. Packers 7–3. **Drive: 13 plays, 92 yards, 6:50.**
- HOU – Joe Mixon 2-yard run (Kaʻimi Fairbairn kick), 11:52. Texans 10–7. **Drive: 2 plays, 11 yards, 0:37.**
- GB – Dontayvion Wicks 30-yard pass from Jordan Love (Brandon McManus kick), 8:51. Packers 14–10. **Drive: 6 plays, 70 yards, 3:01.**
- HOU – Kaʻimi Fairbairn 52-yard field goal, 4:30. Packers 14–13. **Drive: 9 plays, 23 yards, 4:21.**
- HOU – Joe Mixon 4-yard run (run failed), 1:13. Texans 19–14. **Drive: 5 plays, 55 yards, 3:05.**

**Third quarter**

- GB – Josh Jacobs 8-yard pass from Jordan Love (Brandon McManus kick), 7:25. Packers 21–19. **Drive: 9 plays, 71 yards, 5:22.**

**Fourth quarter**

- HOU – Kaʻimi Fairbairn 35-yard field goal, 1:52. Texans 22–21. **Drive: 13 plays, 45 yards, 6:27.**
- GB – Brandon McManus 45-yard field goal, 0:03. Packers 24–22. **Drive: 7 plays, 44 yards, 1:41.**

**Top passers**

- HOU – C. J. Stroud – 10/21, 86 yards
- GB – Jordan Love – 24/33, 220 yards, 3 TD, 2 INT

**Top rushers**

- HOU – Joe Mixon – 25 rushes, 115 yards, 2 TD
- GB – Josh Jacobs – 12 rushes, 76 yards

**Top receivers**

- HOU – Dalton Schultz – 1 reception, 28 yards
- GB – Romeo Doubs – 8 receptions, 95 yards

Despite having to deal with 3 turnovers in the first half, the Packers would rally late and beat the Texans 24–22 thanks to a last-second field goal by Brandon McManus to improve to 5–2.

==== Week 8: at Jacksonville Jaguars ====
Week 8: Green Bay Packers at Jacksonville Jaguars – Game summary

Quarter	1	2	3	4	Total
**Packers**	0	13	7	10	**30**
Jaguars	0	10	7	10	**27**

at EverBank Stadium, Jacksonville, Florida

- Date: October 27
- Game time: 1:00 p.m. EDT/12:00 p.m. CDT
- Game weather: Sunny, 84 °F (29 °C)
- Game attendance: 65,618
- Referee: Land Clark
- TV announcers (Fox): Kenny Albert, Jonathan Vilma and Megan Olivi
- Recap, Game Book

Game information

**First quarter**

- No scoring plays.

**Second quarter**

- GB – Josh Jacobs 3-yard run (Brandon McManus kick), 11:31. Packers 7–0. **Drive: 3 plays, 28 yards, 1:25.**
- GB – Brandon McManus 31-yard field goal, 6:03. Packers 10–0. **Drive: 6 plays, 67 yards, 3:21.**
- JAX – Trevor Lawrence 6-yard run (Cam Little kick), 2:37. Packers 10–7. **Drive: 6 plays, 70 yards, 3:26.**
- GB – Brandon McManus 38-yard field goal, 0:54. Packers 13–7. **Drive: 10 plays, 51 yards, 1:43.**
- JAX – Cam Little 39-yard field goal, 0:03. Packers 13–10. **Drive: 6 plays, 53 yards, 0:51.**

**Third quarter**

- JAX – Brian Thomas Jr. 14-yard pass from Trevor Lawrence (Cam Little kick), 5:10. Jaguars 17–13. **Drive: 10 plays, 93 yards, 5:33.**
- GB – Josh Jacobs 38-yard run (Brandon McManus kick), 0:21. Packers 20–17. **Drive: 8 plays, 80 yards, 4:49.**

**Fourth quarter**

- GB – Tucker Kraft 3-yard pass from Malik Willis (Brandon McManus kick), 14:06. Packers 27–17. **Drive: 2 plays, 5 yards, 0:40.**
- JAX – Cam Little 47-yard field goal, 5:36. Packers 27–20. **Drive: 8 plays, 51 yards, 4:04.**
- JAX – Evan Engram 14-yard pass from Trevor Lawrence (Cam Little kick), 1:48. Tied 27–27. **Drive: 8 plays, 87 yards, 2:02.**
- GB – Brandon McManus 24-yard field goal, 0:00. Packers 30–27. **Drive: 8 plays, 64 yards, 1:48.**

**Top passers**

- GB – Jordan Love – 14/22, 196 yards, INT
- JAX – Trevor Lawrence – 21/32, 308 yards, 2 TD, INT

**Top rushers**

- GB – Josh Jacobs – 25 rushes, 127 yards, 2 TD
- JAX – Tank Bigsby – 18 rushes, 78 yards

**Top receivers**

- GB – Tucker Kraft – 3 receptions, 78 yards, TD
- JAX – Brian Thomas Jr. – 3 receptions, 60 yards, TD

Brandon McManus successfully made a last-second field goal at the buzzer for the second straight game. The Packers improve to 6–2 and sweep the AFC South.

==== Week 9: vs. Detroit Lions ====
Week 9: Detroit Lions at Green Bay Packers – Game summary

Quarter	1	2	3	4	Total
**Lions**	0	17	7	0	**24**
Packers	3	0	3	8	**14**

at Lambeau Field, Green Bay, Wisconsin

- Date: November 3
- Game time: 3:25 p.m. CST
- Game weather: Rain, 50 °F (10 °C)
- Game attendance: 78,330
- Referee: Clete Blakeman
- TV announcers (Fox): Kevin Burkhardt, Tom Brady, Erin Andrews and Tom Rinaldi
- Recap, Game Book

Game information

**First quarter**

- GB – Brandon McManus 30-yard field goal, 7:06. Packers 3–0. **Drive: 14 plays, 63 yards, 7:54.**

**Second quarter**

- DET – Amon-Ra St. Brown 3-yard pass from Jared Goff (Jake Bates kick), 14:56. Lions 7–3. **Drive: 13 plays, 70 yards, 7:10.**
- DET – Jake Bates 27-yard field goal, 0:58. Lions 10–3. **Drive: 10 plays, 55 yards, 4:25.**
- DET – Kerby Joseph 27-yard interception return (Jake Bates kick), 0:32. Lions 17–3. **Drive: 2 plays, 8 yards, 0:26.**

**Third quarter**

- DET – Jahmyr Gibbs 15-yard run (Jake Bates kick), 9:32. Lions 24–3. **Drive: 9 plays, 71 yards, 5:28.**
- GB – Brandon McManus 38-yard field goal, 0:48. Lions 24–6. **Drive: 10 plays, 55 yards, 5:09.**

**Fourth quarter**

- GB – Emanuel Wilson 2-yard run (Jordan Love–Christian Watson pass), 3:49. Lions 24–14. **Drive: 8 plays, 55 yards, 2:33.**

**Top passers**

- DET – Jared Goff – 18/22, 145 yards, TD
- GB – Jordan Love – 23/38, 273 yards, INT

**Top rushers**

- DET – David Montgomery – 17 rushes, 73 yards
- GB – Josh Jacobs – 13 rushes, 95 yards

**Top receivers**

- DET – Amon-Ra St. Brown – 7 receptions, 56 yards, TD
- GB – Jayden Reed – 5 receptions, 113 yards

==== Week 11: at Chicago Bears ====
Week 11: Green Bay Packers at Chicago Bears – Game summary

Quarter	1	2	3	4	Total
**Packers**	7	0	7	6	**20**
Bears	3	7	9	0	**19**

at Soldier Field, Chicago, Illinois

- Date: November 17
- Game time: 12:00 p.m. CST
- Game weather: Mostly cloudy, 54 °F (12 °C)
- Game attendance: 59,419
- Referee: Bill Vinovich
- TV announcers (Fox): Kevin Burkhardt, Tom Brady, Erin Andrews and Tom Rinaldi
- Recap, Game Book

Game information

**First quarter**

- GB – Jayden Reed 15-yard pass from Jordan Love (Brandon McManus kick), 11:15. Packers 7–0. **Drive: 8 plays, 70 yards, 3:45.**
- CHI – Cairo Santos 53-yard field goal, 7:49. Packers 7–3. **Drive: 8 plays, 34 yards, 3:26.**

**Second quarter**

- CHI – Roschon Johnson 1-yard run (Cairo Santos kick), 0:07. Bears 10–7. **Drive: 13 plays, 76 yards, 5:42.**

**Third quarter**

- CHI – Cairo Santos 27-yard field goal, 10:07. Bears 13–7. **Drive: 10 plays, 61 yards, 4:43.**
- GB – Josh Jacobs 7-yard run (Brandon McManus kick), 6:34. Packers 14–13. **Drive: 6 plays, 70 yards, 3:43.**
- CHI – D'Andre Swift 39-yard run (pass failed), 0:31. Bears 19–14. **Drive: 11 plays, 78 yards, 6:03.**

**Fourth quarter**

- GB – Jordan Love 1-yard run (run failed), 2:59. Packers 20–19. **Drive: 4 plays, 78 yards, 1:18.**

**Top passers**

- GB – Jordan Love – 13/17, 261 yards, TD, INT
- CHI – Caleb Williams – 23/31, 231 yards

**Top rushers**

- GB – Josh Jacobs – 18 rushes, 76 yards, TD
- CHI – D'Andre Swift – 14 rushes, 71 yards, TD

**Top receivers**

- GB – Christian Watson – 4 receptions, 150 yards
- CHI – Rome Odunze – 6 receptions, 65 yards

Bears kicker Cairo Santos' potential game-winning 46-yard field goal attempt was blocked by Karl Brooks as time expired, improving the Packers to 7–3 and winning their 11th straight game against the Bears.

==== Week 12: vs. San Francisco 49ers ====
Week 12: San Francisco 49ers at Green Bay Packers – Game summary

Quarter	1	2	3	4	Total
49ers	0	7	3	0	**10**
**Packers**	10	7	7	14	**38**

at Lambeau Field, Green Bay, Wisconsin

- Date: November 24
- Game time: 3:25 p.m. CST
- Game weather: Cloudy, 43 °F (6 °C)
- Game attendance: 78,222
- Referee: Craig Wrolstad
- TV announcers (Fox): Kevin Burkhardt, Tom Brady, Erin Andrews and Tom Rinaldi
- Recap, Game Book

Game information

**First quarter**

- GB – Tucker Kraft 11-yard pass from Jordan Love (Brandon McManus kick), 7:35. Packers 7–0. **Drive: 12 plays, 67 yards, 7:25.**
- GB – Brandon McManus 51-yard field goal, 0:11. Packers 10–0. **Drive: 10 plays, 49 yards, 4:44.**

**Second quarter**

- GB – Josh Jacobs 1-yard run (Brandon McManus kick), 6:33. Packers 17–0. **Drive: 12 plays, 71 yards, 6:56.**
- SF – George Kittle 3-yard pass from Brandon Allen (Jake Moody kick), 1:02. Packers 17–7. **Drive: 11 plays, 65 yards, 5:31.**

**Third quarter**

- GB – Josh Jacobs 1-yard run (Brandon McManus kick), 4:28. Packers 24–7. **Drive: 3 plays, 26 yards, 1:21.**
- SF – Jake Moody 48-yard field goal, 2:12. Packers 24–10. **Drive: 6 plays, 44 yards, 2:16.**

**Fourth quarter**

- GB – Josh Jacobs 1-yard run (Brandon McManus kick), 10:59. Packers 31–10. **Drive: 3 plays, 16 yards, 1:31.**
- GB – Malik Heath 3-yard pass from Jordan Love (Brandon McManus kick), 4:14. Packers 38–10. **Drive: 10 plays, 56 yards, 6:37.**

**Top passers**

- SF – Brandon Allen – 17/29, 199 yards, TD, INT
- GB – Jordan Love – 13/23, 163 yards, 2 TD

**Top rushers**

- SF – Christian McCaffrey – 11 rushes, 31 yards
- GB – Josh Jacobs – 26 rushes, 106 yards, 3 TD

**Top receivers**

- SF – George Kittle – 6 receptions, 82 yards, TD
- GB – Romeo Doubs – 3 receptions, 54 yards

In a rematch of last year's NFC Divisional Round game, the Packers blew out the 49ers 38–10 and improved to 8–3. As of this game, this is the Packers' largest margin of victory against the 49ers.

==== Week 13: vs. Miami Dolphins ====
Thanksgiving Day games

Week 13: Miami Dolphins at Green Bay Packers – Game summary

Quarter	1	2	3	4	Total
Dolphins	0	3	8	6	**17**
**Packers**	14	10	3	3	**30**

at Lambeau Field, Green Bay, Wisconsin

- Date: November 28
- Game time: 7:20 p.m. CST
- Game weather: Cloudy, 27 °F (−3 °C)
- Game attendance: 77,599
- Referee: Shawn Smith
- TV announcers (NBC): Mike Tirico, Jason Garrett and Melissa Stark
- Recap, Game Book

Game information

**First quarter**

- GB – Jayden Reed 3-yard pass from Jordan Love (Brandon McManus kick), 12:00. Packers 7–0. **Drive: 3 plays, 9 yards, 1:30.**
- GB – Josh Jacobs 1-yard run (Brandon McManus kick), 0:55. Packers 14–0. **Drive: 12 plays, 76 yards, 6:58.**

**Second quarter**

- MIA – Jason Sanders 33-yard field goal, 8:44. Packers 14–3. **Drive: 12 plays, 55 yards, 7:11.**
- GB – Jayden Reed 12-yard pass from Jordan Love (Brandon McManus kick), 1:36. Packers 21–3. **Drive: 6 plays, 62 yards, 1:27.**
- GB – Brandon McManus 46-yard field goal, 0:00. Packers 24–3. **Drive: 4 plays, 34 yards, 0:22.**

**Third quarter**

- GB – Brandon McManus 24-yard field goal, 7:24. Packers 27–3. **Drive: 8 plays, 72 yards, 5:10.**
- MIA – De'Von Achane 14-yard pass from Tua Tagovailoa (Tua Tagovailoa–Jaylen Waddle pass), 2:43. Packers 27–11. **Drive: 8 plays, 70 yards, 4:59.**

**Fourth quarter**

- GB – Brandon McManus 33-yard field goal, 5:02. Packers 30–11. **Drive: 9 plays, 78 yards, 4:31.**
- MIA – Tyreek Hill 12-yard pass from Tua Tagovailoa (pass failed), 3:04. Packers 30–17. **Drive: 7 plays, 67 yards, 1:58.**

**Top passers**

- MIA – Tua Tagovailoa – 36/45, 357 yards, 2 TD
- GB – Jordan Love – 21/28, 274 yards, 2 TD

**Top rushers**

- MIA – Raheem Mostert – 5 rushes, 19 yards
- GB – Josh Jacobs – 19 rushes, 43 yards, TD

**Top receivers**

- MIA – Jonnu Smith – 10 receptions, 113 yards
- GB – Tucker Kraft – 6 receptions, 78 yards

==== Week 14: at Detroit Lions ====
Week 14: Green Bay Packers at Detroit Lions – Game summary

Quarter	1	2	3	4	Total
Packers	0	7	14	10	**31**
**Lions**	7	10	7	10	**34**

at Ford Field, Detroit, Michigan

- Date: December 5
- Game time: 8:15 p.m. EST/7:15 p.m. CST
- Game weather: None (indoor stadium)
- Game attendance: 63,987
- Referee: John Hussey
- TV announcers (WGBA, WITI, WJBK): Al Michaels, Kirk Herbstreit and Kaylee Hartung
  Game exclusive to WGBA, WITI, and WJBK. Available out of market on Prime Video.
- Recap, Game Book

Game information

**First quarter**

- DET – David Montgomery 3-yard run (Jake Bates kick), 9:41. Lions 7–0. **Drive: 11 plays, 70 yards, 5:19.**

**Second quarter**

- DET – Jake Bates 43-yard field goal, 13:01. Lions 10–0. **Drive: 6 plays, 29 yards, 1:49.**
- GB – Josh Jacobs 1-yard run (Brandon McManus kick), 5:35. Lions 10–7. **Drive: 11 plays, 70 yards, 7:26.**
- DET – Jahmyr Gibbs 2-yard pass from Jared Goff (Jake Bates kick), 0:11. Lions 17–7. **Drive: 12 plays, 70 yards, 5:24.**

**Third quarter**

- GB – Tucker Kraft 12-yard pass from Jordan Love (Brandon McManus kick), 13:15. Lions 17–14. **Drive: 5 plays, 70 yards, 1:45.**
- GB – Josh Jacobs 6-yard run (Brandon McManus kick), 11:15. Packers 21–17. **Drive: 3 plays, 16 yards, 1:06.**
- DET – Tim Patrick 3-yard pass from Jared Goff (Jake Bates kick), 5:02. Lions 24–21. **Drive: 13 plays, 70 yards, 6:13.**

**Fourth quarter**

- GB – Josh Jacobs 4-yard run (Brandon McManus kick), 14:20. Packers 28–24. **Drive: 4 plays, 30 yards, 2:06.**
- DET – Tim Patrick 1-yard pass from Jared Goff (Jake Bates kick), 8:39. Lions 31–28. **Drive: 10 plays, 70 yards, 5:41.**
- GB – Brandon McManus 32-yard field goal, 3:38. Tied 31–31. **Drive: 9 plays, 56 yards, 5:01.**
- DET – Jake Bates 35-yard field goal, 0:00. Lions 34–31. **Drive: 11 plays, 53 yards, 3:38.**

**Top passers**

- GB – Jordan Love – 12/20, 206 yards, TD
- DET – Jared Goff – 32/41, 283 yards, 3 TD, INT

**Top rushers**

- GB – Josh Jacobs – 18 rushes, 66 yards, 3 TD
- DET – David Montgomery – 14 rushes, 51 yards, TD

**Top receivers**

- GB – Christian Watson – 4 receptions, 114 yards
- DET – Jameson Williams – 5 receptions, 80 yards

==== Week 15: at Seattle Seahawks ====
Week 15: Green Bay Packers at Seattle Seahawks – Game summary

Quarter	1	2	3	4	Total
**Packers**	14	6	3	7	**30**
Seahawks	0	3	3	7	**13**

at Lumen Field, Seattle, Washington

- Date: December 15
- Game time: 7:15 p.m. CST/5:15 p.m. PST
- Game weather: Cloudy, 43 °F (6 °C)
- Game attendance: 68,766
- Referee: Clete Blakeman
- TV announcers (NBC): Mike Tirico, Cris Collinsworth and Melissa Stark
- Recap, Game Book

Game information

**First quarter**

- GB – Josh Jacobs 1-yard run (Brandon McManus kick), 9:19. Packers 7–0. **Drive: 10 plays, 63 yards, 5:41.**
- GB – Romeo Doubs 13-yard pass from Jordan Love (Brandon McManus kick), 1:54. Packers 14–0. **Drive: 8 plays, 80 yards, 4:49.**

**Second quarter**

- SEA – Jason Myers 48-yard field goal, 12:59. Packers 14–3. **Drive: 7 plays, 40 yards, 3:55.**
- GB – Brandon McManus 39-yard field goal, 9:21. Packers 17–3. **Drive: 8 plays, 51 yards, 3:38.**
- GB – Brandon McManus 21-yard field goal, 0:00. Packers 20–3. **Drive: 7 plays, 83 yards, 2:54.**

**Third quarter**

- SEA – Jason Myers 45-yard field goal, 6:20. Packers 20–6. **Drive: 5 plays, 20 yards, 1:26.**
- GB – Brandon McManus 23-yard field goal, 1:36. Packers 23–6. **Drive: 7 plays, 65 yards, 4:44.**

**Fourth quarter**

- SEA – Zach Charbonnet 24-yard run (Jason Myers kick), 11:16. Packers 23–13. **Drive: 5 plays, 45 yards, 1:28.**
- GB – Romeo Doubs 22-yard pass from Jordan Love (Brandon McManus kick), 4:59. Packers 30–13. **Drive: 3 plays, 27 yards, 0:18.**

**Top passers**

- GB – Jordan Love – 20/27, 229 yards, 2 TD
- SEA – Geno Smith – 15/19, 149 yards, INT

**Top rushers**

- GB – Josh Jacobs – 26 rushes, 94 yards, TD
- SEA – Zach Charbonnet – 8 rushes, 54 yards, TD

**Top receivers**

- GB – Christian Watson – 3 receptions, 56 yards
- SEA – Jaxon Smith-Njigba – 10 receptions, 83 yards

==== Week 16: vs. New Orleans Saints ====
Week 16: New Orleans Saints at Green Bay Packers – Game summary

Quarter	1	2	3	4	Total
Saints	0	0	0	0	**0**
**Packers**	7	14	3	10	**34**

at Lambeau Field, Green Bay, Wisconsin

- Date: December 23
- Game time: 7:15 p.m. CST
- Game weather: Cloudy, 34 °F (1 °C)
- Game attendance: 77,885
- Referee: Alex Kemp
- TV announcers (ESPN/ABC): Joe Buck, Troy Aikman and Lisa Salters
- Recap, Game Book

Game information

**First quarter**

- GB – Dontayvion Wicks 2-yard pass from Jordan Love (Brandon McManus kick), 8:41. Packers 7–0. **Drive: 10 plays, 63 yards, 6:19.**

**Second quarter**

- GB – Josh Jacobs 2-yard run (Brandon McManus kick), 11:43. Packers 14–0. **Drive: 17 plays, 96 yards, 8:55.**
- GB – Chris Brooks 1-yard run (Brandon McManus kick), 6:28. Packers 21–0. **Drive: 6 plays, 67 yards, 2:57.**

**Third quarter**

- GB – Brandon McManus 55-yard field goal, 7:03. Packers 24–0. **Drive: 10 plays, 47 yards, 5:11.**

**Fourth quarter**

- GB – Brandon McManus 46-yard field goal, 7:13. Packers 27–0. **Drive: 9 plays, 56 yards, 4:37.**
- GB – Emanuel Wilson 1-yard run (Brandon McManus kick), 2:41. Packers 34–0. **Drive: 7 plays, 48 yards, 3:03.**

**Top passers**

- NO – Spencer Rattler – 15/30, 153 yards, INT
- GB – Jordan Love – 16/28, 182 yards, TD

**Top rushers**

- NO – Spencer Rattler – 5 rushes, 28 yards
- GB – Josh Jacobs – 13 rushes, 69 yards, TD

**Top receivers**

- NO – Foster Moreau – 2 receptions, 33 yards
- GB – Jayden Reed – 3 receptions, 76 yards

The Packers became the first team to record a shutout in the season, and improved to 11–4, clinching a playoff berth with the win.

==== Week 17: at Minnesota Vikings ====
Week 17: Green Bay Packers at Minnesota Vikings – Game summary

Quarter	1	2	3	4	Total
Packers	3	0	7	15	**25**
**Vikings**	0	13	14	0	**27**

at U.S. Bank Stadium, Minneapolis, Minnesota

- Date: December 29
- Game time: 3:25 p.m. CST
- Game weather: None (indoor stadium)
- Game attendance: 67,031
- Referee: Carl Cheffers
- TV announcers (Fox): Kevin Burkhardt, Tom Brady, Erin Andrews and Tom Rinaldi
- Recap, Game Book

Game information

**First quarter**

- GB – Brandon McManus 22-yard field goal, 1:47. Packers 3–0. **Drive: 8 plays, 49 yards, 4:15.**

**Second quarter**

- MIN – Jalen Nailor 31-yard pass from Sam Darnold (Will Reichard kick), 11:52. Vikings 7–3. **Drive: 9 plays, 77 yards, 4:55.**
- MIN – Will Reichard 25-yard field goal, 2:16. Vikings 10–3. **Drive: 10 plays, 69 yards, 5:13.**
- MIN – Will Reichard 50-yard field goal, 0:00. Vikings 13–3. **Drive: 6 plays, 52 yards, 1:16.**

**Third quarter**

- MIN – Jordan Addison 18-yard pass from Sam Darnold (Will Reichard kick), 9:44. Vikings 20–3. **Drive: 9 plays, 70 yards, 5:16.**
- GB – Josh Jacobs 2-yard run (Brandon McManus kick), 5:07. Vikings 20–10. **Drive: 4 plays, 16 yards, 1:56.**
- MIN – Cam Akers 9-yard pass from Sam Darnold (Will Reichard kick), 0:51. Vikings 27–10. **Drive: 8 plays, 70 yards, 4:16.**

**Fourth quarter**

- GB – Emanuel Wilson 5-yard run (Jordan Love–Romeo Doubs pass), 6:12. Vikings 27–18. **Drive: 9 plays, 67 yards, 3:06.**
- GB – Malik Heath 3-yard pass from Jordan Love (Brandon McManus kick), 2:18. Vikings 27–25. **Drive: 9 plays, 62 yards, 2:19.**

**Top passers**

- GB – Jordan Love – 19/30, 185 yards, TD
- MIN – Sam Darnold – 33/43, 377 yards, 3 TD, INT

**Top rushers**

- GB – Josh Jacobs – 17 rushes, 69 yards, TD
- MIN – Aaron Jones – 12 rushes, 47 yards

**Top receivers**

- GB – Romeo Doubs – 7 receptions, 58 yards
- MIN – Justin Jefferson – 8 receptions, 92 yards

==== Week 18: vs. Chicago Bears ====
Week 18: Chicago Bears at Green Bay Packers – Game summary

Quarter	1	2	3	4	Total
**Bears**	7	7	0	10	**24**
Packers	3	10	0	9	**22**

at Lambeau Field, Green Bay, Wisconsin

- Date: January 5
- Game time: 12:00 p.m. CST
- Game weather: Cloudy, 16 °F (−9 °C)
- Game attendance: 77,862
- Referee: Clay Martin
- TV announcers (Fox): Kevin Kugler, Daryl Johnston and Laura Okmin
- Recap, Game Book

Game information

**First quarter**

- CHI – Josh Blackwell 94-yard punt return for a touchdown (Cairo Santos kick), 6:34. Bears 7–0.
- GB – Brandon McManus 37-yard field goal, 2:24. Bears 7–3. **Drive: 8 plays, 52 yards, 4:10.**

**Second quarter**

- CHI – D'Andre Swift 4-yard run (Cairo Santos kick), 14:17. Bears 14–3. **Drive: 3 plays, 21 yards, 0:45.**
- GB – Josh Jacobs 9-yard run (Brandon McManus kick), 11:12. Bears 14–10. **Drive: 7 plays, 63 yards, 3:05.**
- GB – Brandon McManus 30-yard field goal, 1:57. Bears 14–13. **Drive: 11 plays, 68 yards, 5:28.**

**Third quarter**

- No scoring plays

**Fourth quarter**

- CHI – D. J. Moore 32-yard pass from Caleb Williams (Cairo Santos kick), 10:02. Bears 21–13. **Drive: 8 plays, 61 yards, 4:53.**
- GB – Emanuel Wilson (pass failed), 4:28. Bears 21–19. **Drive: 4 plays, 51 yards, 1:30.**
- GB – Brandon McManus 55-yard field goal, 0:54. Packers 22–21. **Drive: 4 plays, 6 yards, 0:55.**
- CHI – Cairo Santos 51-yard field goal, 0:00. Bears 24–22. **Drive: 6 plays, 47 yards, 0:54.**

**Top passers**

- CHI – Caleb Williams – 21/29, 148 yards, TD
- GB – Malik Willis – 10/13, 136 yards

**Top rushers**

- CHI – D'Andre Swift – 20 rushes, 65 yards, TD
- GB – Emanuel Wilson – 14 rushes, 73 yards, TD

**Top receivers**

- CHI – D. J. Moore – 9 receptions, 86 yards, TD
- GB – Malik Heath – 3 receptions, 53 yards

=== Standings ===
==== Division ====
NFC North
	W	L	T	PCT	DIV	CONF	PF	PA	STK
^{(1)} Detroit Lions	15	2	0	.882	6–0	11–1	564	342	W3
^{(5)} Minnesota Vikings	14	3	0	.824	4–2	9–3	432	332	L1
^{(7)} Green Bay Packers	11	6	0	.647	1–5	6–6	460	338	L2
Chicago Bears	5	12	0	.294	1–5	3–9	310	370	W1

==== Conference ====
NFC
Seed	Team	Division	W	L	T	PCT	DIV	CONF	SOS	SOV	STK
**Division leaders**
1	Detroit Lions	North	15	2	0	.882	6–0	11–1	.516	.494	W3
2	Philadelphia Eagles	East	14	3	0	.824	5–1	9–3	.453	.424	W2
3 (Note: Tampa Bay clinched the #3 seed over Los Angeles based on conference record. (Tampa Bay 8–4 to Los Angeles 6–6))	Tampa Bay Buccaneers	South	10	7	0	.588	4–2	8–4	.502	.465	W2
4 (Note: Los Angeles clinched the NFC West and #4 seed over Seattle based on strength of victory. (Los Angeles .441 to Seattle .424))	Los Angeles Rams	West	10	7	0	.588	4–2	6–6	.505	.441	L1
**Wild cards**
5	Minnesota Vikings	North	14	3	0	.824	4–2	9–3	.474	.408	L1
6	Washington Commanders	East	12	5	0	.706	4–2	9–3	.436	.358	W5
7	Green Bay Packers	North	11	6	0	.647	1–5	6–6	.533	.412	L2
**Did not qualify for the postseason**
8	Seattle Seahawks	West	10	7	0	.588	4–2	6–6	.498	.424	W2
9 (Note: Atlanta finished ahead of Arizona based on conference record. (Atlanta 7–5 to Arizona 4–8))	Atlanta Falcons	South	8	9	0	.471	4–2	7–5	.519	.426	L2
10	Arizona Cardinals	West	8	9	0	.471	3–3	4–8	.536	.404	W1
11	Dallas Cowboys	East	7	10	0	.412	3–3	5–7	.522	.387	L2
12	San Francisco 49ers	West	6	11	0	.353	1–5	4–8	.564	.402	L4
13 (Note: Chicago finished ahead of Carolina based on head-to-head victory.)	Chicago Bears	North	5	12	0	.294	1–5	3–9	.554	.388	W1
14 (Note: Carolina finished ahead of New Orleans based on strength of victory. (Carolina .329 to New Orleans .306))	Carolina Panthers	South	5	12	0	.294	2–4	4–8	.498	.329	W1
15	New Orleans Saints	South	5	12	0	.294	2–4	4–8	.505	.306	L4
16	New York Giants	East	3	14	0	.176	0–6	1–11	.554	.412	L1
**Tiebreakers** (Note: When breaking ties for three or more teams under the NFL's rules, they are first broken within divisions, then comparing only the highest ranked remaining team from each division.)

== Postseason ==
=== Schedule ===
Round	Date	Opponent (seed)	Result	Record	Venue	Recap
Wild Card	January 12	at Philadelphia Eagles (2)	L 10–22	0–1	Lincoln Financial Field	Recap

=== Game summaries ===
==== NFC Wild Card Playoffs: at (2) Philadelphia Eagles ====
NFC Wild Card Playoffs: (7) Green Bay Packers at (2) Philadelphia Eagles – Game Summary

Quarter	1	2	3	4	Total
Packers	0	0	3	7	10
Eagles	10	0	6	6	22

at Lincoln Financial Field, Philadelphia, Pennsylvania

- Date: January 12, 2025
- Game time: 4:30 p.m. EST/3:30 p.m. CST
- Game weather: Cloudy, 40 °F (4 °C)
- Game attendance: 69,879
- Referee: Brad Allen
- TV announcers (Fox): Kevin Burkhardt, Tom Brady, Erin Andrews and Tom Rinaldi
- Recap, Game Book

Game information

First quarter

- PHI – Jahan Dotson 11-yard pass from Jalen Hurts (Jake Elliott kick), 13:21. Eagles 7–0. Drive: 3 plays, 28 yards, 1:32.
- PHI – Jake Elliott 31-yard field goal, 0:19. Eagles 10–0. Drive: 11 plays, 57 yards, 5:00.

Second quarter

- No scoring plays

Third quarter

- GB – Brandon McManus 26-yard field goal, 5:46. Eagles 10–3. Drive: 12 plays, 76 yards, 5:47.
- PHI – Dallas Goedert 24-yard pass from Jalen Hurts (kick failed), 3:20. Eagles 16–3. Drive: 5 plays, 68 yards, 2:26.

Fourth quarter

- GB – Josh Jacobs 1-yard run (Brandon McManus kick), 14:56. Eagles 16–10. Drive: 9 plays, 78 yards, 3:24.
- PHI – Jake Elliott 30-yard field goal, 7:33. Eagles 19–10. Drive: 13 plays, 58 yards, 7:23.
- PHI – Jake Elliott 32-yard field goal, 3:12. Eagles 22–10. Drive: 6 plays, 27 yards, 1:46.

Top passers

- GB – Jordan Love – 20/33, 212 yards, 3 INT
- PHI – Jalen Hurts – 13/21, 131 yards, 2 TD

Top rushers

- GB – Josh Jacobs – 18 rushes, 81 yards, TD
- PHI – Saquon Barkley – 25 rushes, 119 yards

Top receivers

- GB – Jayden Reed – 4 receptions, 46 yards
- PHI – DeVonta Smith – 4 receptions, 55 yards

This was the fourth playoff meeting between Philadelphia and Green Bay. The Eagles led the playoff series 2–1, including wins in the 1960 NFL Championship Game and the 2003 NFC Divisional Game, where the Eagles converted on 4th and 26 on their tying drive late in the fourth quarter, although the Packers won the most recent playoff meeting, a 21–16 win in the 2010 NFC Wild Card Game in Philadelphia en route to their win in Super Bowl XLV. In the regular season, the Eagles defeated the Packers 34–29 in a neutral-site game in São Paulo, Brazil in Week 1.

The Eagles recovered a fumble on the opening kickoff and scored a touchdown to take an early 7–0 lead. At the end of the quarter, the Eagles kicked a field goal to extend the lead to 10–0. Following a scoreless second quarter, the Packers cut the lead to 10–3 with a field goal almost 10 minutes into the third quarter, but the Eagles soon extended the lead to 16–3 with a Dallas Goedert touchdown. While the Packers cut the deficit to 16–10 early in the fourth quarter with a touchdown from Josh Jacobs, the Eagles responded with a field goal to go up 19–10. Following a turnover on downs from the Packers, the Eagles kicked another field goal to take a 22–10 lead. Cornerback Quinyon Mitchell then intercepted Jordan Love in the end zone, sealing the win for Philadelphia.

== Statistics ==
=== Starters ===
==== Regular season ====
Offense

Pos.	Name	GS
QB	Jordan Love; Malik Willis	15; 2
RB	Josh Jacobs	17
WR	Romeo Doubs; Dontayvion Wicks; Jayden Reed; Malik Heath	12; 3; 1; 1
WR2	Christian Watson; Dontayvion Wicks	15; 2
WR3	Jayden Reed	9
TE	Tucker Kraft	17
TE2	Ben Sims; Luke Musgrave	5; 3
LT	Rasheed Walker	17
LG	Elgton Jenkins; Jordan Morgan	16; 1
C	Josh Myers; Elgton Jenkins	16; 1
RG	Sean Rhyan	17
RT	Zach Tom	17

Defense

Pos.	Name	GS
DE	Preston Smith; Kingsley Enagbare; Colby Wooden	9; 7; 1
DT	Tedarrell Slaton	17
DT	Kenny Clark	17
DE	Rashan Gary	17
LB1	Isaiah McDuffie	17
LB2	Quay Walker; Edgerrin Cooper	13; 4
LB3	Eric Wilson	12
CB	Jaire Alexander; Carrington Valentine; Keisean Nixon; Corey Ballentine	7; 5; 4; 1
CB2	Keisean Nixon; Eric Stokes; Carrington Valentine	8; 7; 2
CB3	Keisean Nixon	3
S	Xavier McKinney	17
S2	Javon Bullard; Evan Williams; Zayne Anderson	9; 6; 2
S3	Javon Bullard	2

==== Postseason ====
Offense

Pos.	Name	GS
QB	Jordan Love	1
RB	Josh Jacobs	1
WR	Romeo Doubs	1
WR2	Dontayvion Wicks	1
WR3	Jayden Reed	1
TE	Tucker Kraft	1
LT	Rasheed Walker	1
LG	Elgton Jenkins	1
C	Josh Myers	1
RG	Sean Rhyan	1
RT	Zach Tom	1

Defense

Pos.	Name	GS
DE	Kingsley Enagbare	1
DT	Tedarrell Slaton	1
DT	Kenny Clark	1
DE	Rashan Gary	1
LB1	Isaiah McDuffie	1
LB2	Quay Walker	1
LB3	Edgerrin Cooper	1
CB	Carrington Valentine	1
CB2	Eric Stokes	1
S	Xavier McKinney	1
S2	Evan Williams	1

=== Team leaders ===
Category	Player(s)	Value
Passing yards	Jordan Love	3389
Passing touchdowns	Jordan Love	25
Rushing yards	Josh Jacobs	1329
Rushing touchdowns	Josh Jacobs	15
Receptions	Jayden Reed	55
Receiving yards	Jayden Reed	857
Receiving touchdowns	Tucker Kraft	7
Kickoff return yards	Keisean Nixon	528
Punt return yards	Jayden Reed	110
Tackles	Quay Walker	102
Sacks	Rashan Gary	7.5
Interceptions	Xavier McKinney	8

=== League rankings ===
Category	Total yards	Yards per game	NFL rank (out of 32)
Passing offense	3807	223.9	12th
Rushing offense	2496	146.8	5th
Total offense	6304	370.8	5th
Passing defense	3658	215.2	13th
Rushing defense	1689	99.4	7th
Total defense	5366	315.6	6th

Category	Total points	Points per game	NFL rank (out of 32)
Offensive points scored	460	27.1	8th
Defensive points allowed	338	19.9	6th

Statistical values are correct through January 6, 2025

== Awards ==
Recipient	Award(s)
Karl Brooks	Week 11: NFC Special Teams Player of the Week
Edgerrin Cooper	Week 8: NFC Defensive Player of the Week; Week 15: NFC Defensive Player of the Week; December/January NFC Defensive Rookie of the Month
Rashan Gary	2025 Pro Bowl Games
Josh Jacobs	2025 Pro Bowl Games
Jordan Love	Week 6: FedEx Air & Ground Players of the Week
Xavier McKinney	Week 5: NFC Defensive Player of the Week; October: NFC Defensive Player of the Month; 2025 Pro Bowl Games; All-Pro
