= Edgerrin =

Edgerrin is a masculine given name. Notable people with the name include:

- Edgerrin Cooper (born 2001), American football player
- Edgerrin James (born 1978), American football player
