= Javon Bullard =

American football player (born 2002)

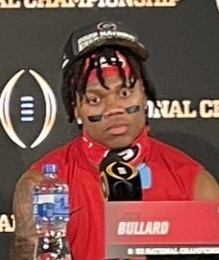
- Bullard with Georgia in 2023

No. 7 – Green Bay Packers
- Position: Safety
- Roster status: Active

Personal information
- Born: September 5, 2002 (age 24); Eatonton, Georgia, U.S.
- Listed height: 5 ft 10 in (1.78 m)
- Listed weight: 198 lb (90 kg)

Career information
- High school: Baldwin (Milledgeville, Georgia)
- College: Georgia (2021–2023)
- NFL draft: 2024: 2nd round, 58th overall pick

Career history
- Green Bay Packers (2024–present)

Awards and highlights
- 2× CFP National Champion (2021, 2022); CFP National Championship Game Defensive MVP (2023); Second-team All-SEC (2023)

Career NFL statistics as of Week 10, 2026
- Total tackles: 222
- Forced fumbles: 1
- Fumble recoveries: 2
- Pass deflections: 11
- Stats at Pro Football Reference

Javon Mascellus Bullard (born September 5, 2002) is an American professional football safety for the Green Bay Packers of the National Football League (NFL). He played college football for the Georgia Bulldogs, winning two national championships and was selected by the Packers in the second round of the 2024 NFL draft.

== Early life ==
Bullard was born on September 5, 2002, in Eatonton, Georgia, moving to Milledgeville, Georgia when he was five. He attended Baldwin High School in Milledgeville. A three-star recruit, Bullard committed to play college football at the University of Georgia over offers from Auburn and Tennessee.

== College career ==
As a true freshman in 2021, Bullard appeared in 14 games. Against Charleston Southern, Bullard led Georgia in total tackles with six. He finished the season with 12 total tackles. The following season, Bullard started in the first two games, recording four tackles and one pass breakup. On September 26, 2022, Bullard was arrested on DUI charges. He would be suspended for one game before returning against Auburn. Bullard would tally a career-high eight tackles in a victory over Florida. Against undefeated Tennessee, Bullard tallied seven tackles and two sacks in a 27–13 win. The following week, Bullard exited the game with a lower-leg injury, but he returned for the next game against Kentucky. In the Peach Bowl, Bullard had a hit on Marvin Harrison Jr. that knocked Harrison out of the game with a concussion. Georgia went on to win the game 42–41, with Bullard being named the game's defensive MVP. During the 2023 College Football Playoff National Championship Game, Bullard recorded two interceptions and a fumble recovery before leaving the game with a shoulder injury. He was named the game's defensive MVP. During the 2023 season, Bullard recorded 55 tackles, a tackle for loss, and two interceptions before declaring for the 2024 NFL draft on December 31, 2023.

== Professional career ==
Pre-draft measurables
| Height | Weight | Arm length | Hand span | Wingspan | 40-yard dash | 10-yard split | 20-yard split | 20-yard shuttle | Three-cone drill | Vertical jump | Bench press |
|---|---|---|---|---|---|---|---|---|---|---|---|
| 5 ft 10 1/2 in (1.79 m) | 198 lb (90 kg) | 30 3/4 in (0.78 m) | 9 in (0.23 m) | 6 ft 1 7/8 in (1.88 m) | 4.47 s | 1.51 s | 2.57 s | 3.97 s | 7.00 s | 33.0 in (0.84 m) | 16 reps |
All values from NFL Combine/Pro Day

Bullard was selected in the second round with the 58th overall pick of the 2024 NFL draft by the Green Bay Packers. He became the fourth Georgia player in Packers draft history. He signed his rookie contract on June 3, 2024. Entering week 4 of the 2024 season, Bullard moved down to the slot/nickel corner position after losing the starting strong safety spot to fellow rookie Evan Williams.

== NFL career statistics ==
Legend
| **Bold** | Career high |

=== Regular season ===
| Year | Team | Games | | Tackles | | | | | | Interceptions | | | | | | Fumbles | | | |
| Year | Team | GP | GS | Cmb | Solo | Ast | Sck | TFL | Sfty | PD | Int | Yds | Avg | Lng | TD | FF | FR | Yds | TD |
|---|---|---|---|---|---|---|---|---|---|---|---|---|---|---|---|---|---|---|---|
| 2024 | GB | 15 | **11** | **90** | **61** | 29 | 0.0 | **2** | 0 | 1 | 0 | 0 | 0.0 | 0 | 0 | 0 | **1** | **3** | 0 |
| 2025 | GB | **17** | 7 | 83 | 49 | **34** | 0.0 | **2** | 0 | **3** | 0 | 0 | 0.0 | 0 | 0 | 0 | **1** | 0 | 0 |
| Career | | 32 | 18 | 173 | 110 | 63 | 0.0 | 4 | 0 | 4 | 0 | 0 | 0.0 | 0 | 0 | 0 | 2 | 3 | 0 |
Source: pro-football-reference.com

=== Postseason ===
| Year | Team | Games | | Tackles | | | | | | Interceptions | | | | | | Fumbles | | | |
| Year | Team | GP | GS | Cmb | Solo | Ast | Sck | TFL | Sfty | PD | Int | Yds | Avg | Lng | TD | FF | FR | Yds | TD |
|---|---|---|---|---|---|---|---|---|---|---|---|---|---|---|---|---|---|---|---|
| 2024 | GB | **1** | 0 | **3** | **2** | **1** | 0.0 | 0 | 0 | 0 | 0 | 0 | 0.0 | 0 | 0 | 0 | 0 | 0 | 0 |
| 2025 | GB | **1** | **1** | 2 | 1 | **1** | 0.0 | 0 | 0 | 0 | 0 | 0 | 0.0 | 0 | 0 | 0 | 0 | 0 | 0 |
| Career | | 2 | 1 | 5 | 3 | 2 | 0.0 | 0 | 0 | 0 | 0 | 0 | 0.0 | 0 | 0 | 0 | 0 | 0 | 0 |
Source: pro-football-reference.com
