= Robert Rochell =

American football player (born 1998)

Profile
- Position: Cornerback

Personal information
- Born: April 26, 1998 (age 28); Shreveport, Louisiana, U.S.
- Listed height: 6 ft 0 in (1.83 m)
- Listed weight: 193 lb (88 kg)

Career information
- High school: Fair Park (Shreveport)
- College: Central Arkansas (2016–2020)
- NFL draft: 2021: 4th round, 130th overall pick

Career history
- Los Angeles Rams (2021–2022); Seattle Seahawks (2023)*; Carolina Panthers (2023)*; Green Bay Packers (2023–2024); Kansas City Chiefs (2025)*; Dallas Cowboys (2025); Carolina Panthers (2025–2026)
- * Offseason or practice squad member only

Awards and highlights
- Super Bowl champion (LVI); First-team All-Southland (2019)

Career NFL statistics as of Week 5, 2026
- Total tackles: 31
- Fumble recoveries: 3
- Pass deflections: 4
- Interceptions: 1
- Stats at Pro Football Reference

Robert Rochell (born April 26, 1998) is an American professional football cornerback. He played college football for the Central Arkansas Bears before being selected by the Los Angeles Rams in the fourth round of the 2021 NFL draft.

== Early life ==
Rochell grew up in Shreveport, Louisiana and attended Fair Park Medical Careers Magnet High School, where he played football and ran track. He played multiple positions at Fair Park, including quarterback, running back, wide receiver, free safety, cornerback and outside linebacker.

== College career ==
Rochell was a member of the Central Arkansas Bears for five seasons, redshirting his true freshman year. He became a full time starter as a redshirt sophomore. Rochell was named first-team All-Southland Conference after finishing his redshirt junior season with 44 tackles, 2.5 tackles for loss and a fumble recovery with five interceptions and 13 passes broken up. After the 2020 FCS season was moved to the spring due to the COVID-19 pandemic, Central Arkansas played an ad hoc schedule and Rochell started seven of the team's nine games. Rochell played in the 2021 Senior Bowl following the end of the fall season.

== Professional career ==
Pre-draft measurables
Height	Weight	Arm length	Hand span	Wingspan	40-yard dash	10-yard split	20-yard split	20-yard shuttle	Three-cone drill	Vertical jump	Broad jump	Bench press
5 ft 11 3/4 in (1.82 m)	193 lb (88 kg)	32 1/2 in (0.83 m)	8 1/2 in (0.22 m)	6 ft 6 1/4 in (1.99 m)	4.41 s	1.51 s	2.53 s	4.08 s	6.84 s	43.0 in (1.09 m)	11 ft 1 in (3.38 m)	9 reps
All values from Pro Day

=== Los Angeles Rams ===
Rochell was selected in the fourth round with the 130th overall pick of the 2021 NFL draft by the Los Angeles Rams. On June 1, 2021, Rochell signed his four-year rookie contract with the Rams. He was placed on injured reserve on December 11. Without Rochell, the Rams won Super Bowl LVI against the Cincinnati Bengals.

On August 30, 2023, Rochell was released by the Rams as part of final roster cuts.

=== Seattle Seahawks ===
On August 31, 2023, Rochell was signed to the practice squad of the Seattle Seahawks. He was released on September 19.

=== Carolina Panthers ===
On September 20, 2023, Rochell was signed to the Carolina Panthers' practice squad.

=== Green Bay Packers ===
Rochell was signed by the Green Bay Packers on October 25, 2023, off the Panthers practice squad.

Rochell was re-signed by the Packers on March 19, 2024. He was released on August 27, and subsequently re-signed to the practice squad. He was elevated to the active roster for Weeks 3 and 4 in September. On October 7, Rochell was released again and re-added to the Packers' practice squad two days later. He was elevated again for Week 8. The Packers signed Rochell to the active roster on November 16.

=== Kansas City Chiefs ===
On March 28, 2025, Rochell was signed by the Kansas City Chiefs. He was released on May 7.

=== Dallas Cowboys ===
On June 18, 2025, Rochell signed a one-year contract with the Dallas Cowboys. He was released on August 26 as part of final roster cuts and re-signed to the practice squad the next day.

=== Carolina Panthers (second stint) ===
On November 26, 2025, the Carolina Panthers signed Rochell to their active roster off of Dallas' practice squad.

On March 10, 2026, Rochell re-signed with the Panthers. He was released by Carolina on August 30 as a part of final roster cuts. On September 30, Rochell was re-signed to the practice squad. He was released on November 3.

=== Career statistics ===
==== Regular season ====
Year	Team	Games		Tackles				Interceptions					Fumbles	
Year	Team	GP	GS	Cmb	Solo	Ast	PD	Int	Yds	Avg	Lng	TD	FF	FR
2021	LAR	11	5	14	11	3	4	1	1	1.0	1	0	0	1
2022	LAR	17	0	5	5	0	0	0	0	0.0	0	0	0	1
2023	GB	9	0	4	4	0	0	0	0	0.0	0	0	0	0
2024	GB	11	0	2	2	0	0	0	0	0.0	0	0	0	1
2025	DAL	2	0	1	0	1	0	0	0	0.0	0	0	0	0
2025	CAR	4	0	4	2	2	0	0	0	0.0	0	0	0	0
Career		54	5	30	24	6	1	1	1	1.0	1	0	0	3
Source: pro-football-reference.com

==== Postseason ====
Year	Team	Games		Tackles				Interceptions					Fumbles	
Year	Team	GP	GS	Cmb	Solo	Ast	PD	Int	Yds	Avg	Lng	TD	FF	FR
2023	GB	2	0	0	0	0	0	0	0	0.0	0	0	0	0
2024	GB	1	0	0	0	0	0	0	0	0.0	0	0	0	0
Career		3	0	0	0	0	0	0	0	0.0	0	0	0	0
Source: pro-football-reference.com
