= Tedarrell Slaton =

American football player (born 1997)

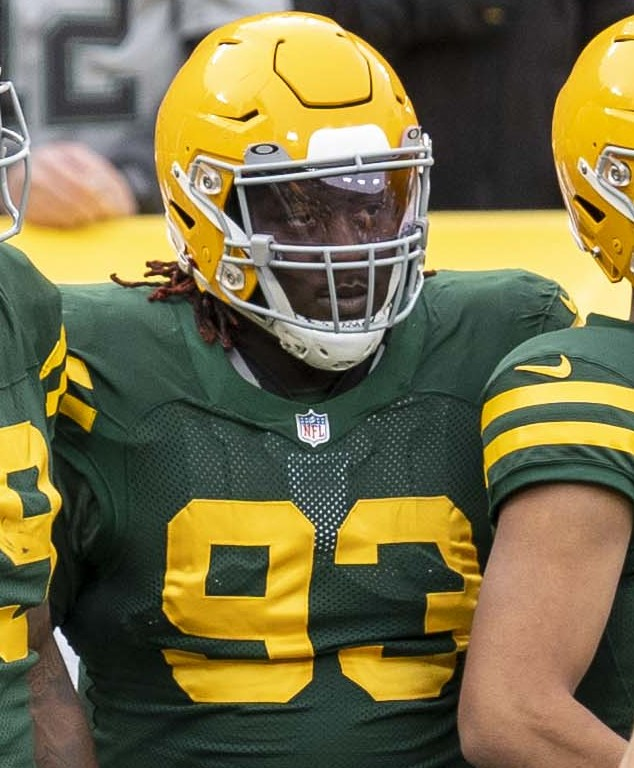
- Slaton with the Green Bay Packers in 2021

No. 98 – Cincinnati Bengals
- Position: Defensive tackle
- Roster status: Active

Personal information
- Born: October 3, 1997 (age 29); Fort Lauderdale, Florida, U.S.
- Listed height: 6 ft 5 in (1.96 m)
- Listed weight: 340 lb (154 kg)

Career information
- High school: American Heritage School (Plantation, Florida)
- College: Florida (2017–2020)
- NFL draft: 2021: 5th round, 173rd overall pick

Career history
- Green Bay Packers (2021–2024); Cincinnati Bengals (2025–present)

Career NFL statistics as of 2025
- Total tackles: 186
- Sacks: 5
- Pass deflections: 4
- Stats at Pro Football Reference

Tedarrell Anthony "TJ" Slaton Jr. (born October 3, 1997) is an American professional football defensive tackle for the Cincinnati Bengals of the National Football League (NFL). He played college football for the Florida Gators, and was selected by the Green Bay Packers in the fifth round of the 2021 NFL draft.

== Early life ==
Slaton was born in Fort Lauderdale, Florida. He attended and played football at American Heritage School in nearby Plantation, where one of his coaches was former National Football League (NFL) cornerback Patrick Surtain. His teammates included Surtain's son, Patrick II, and Tyson Campbell.

== College career ==
Slaton played college football at the University of Florida. In four seasons with the Gators, he played in 45 games with 14 starts, recording 98 tackles (34 solo, 10 for loss), 3.5 sacks, nine quarterback hurries, one pass deflection, and one fumble recovery.

== Professional career ==
Pre-draft measurables
| Height | Weight | Arm length | Hand span | Wingspan | 40-yard dash | 10-yard split | 20-yard split | 20-yard shuttle | Three-cone drill | Vertical jump | Broad jump | Bench press |
|---|---|---|---|---|---|---|---|---|---|---|---|---|
| 6 ft 4 in (1.93 m) | 330 lb (150 kg) | 32 5/8 in (0.83 m) | 9 1/8 in (0.23 m) | 6 ft 8 1/8 in (2.04 m) | 5.08 s | 1.68 s | 2.92 s | 4.84 s | 7.91 s | 29.0 in (0.74 m) | 9 ft 1 in (2.77 m) | 27 reps |
All values from Pro Day

=== Green Bay Packers ===
On May 1, 2021, Slaton was selected in the fifth round with the 173rd overall pick by the Green Bay Packers in the 2021 NFL draft. He signed his four-year rookie contract on May 14. He was listed as second on the depth chart to begin the season, behind veteran Kenny Clark.

He saw his first NFL action on September 12, 2021, against the New Orleans Saints, recording two solo tackles in the 38–3 loss. He recorded a half sack in the Packers' Week 3 victory against the San Francisco 49ers, and another half sack two weeks later in a win against the Cincinnati Bengals. In a Week 7 game against the Washington Football Team, he blocked a 42-yard field goal attempt by Chris Blewitt. He saw extensive action in a Week 9 game against the defending American Football Conference champion Kansas City Chiefs, when he played most of the game in relief of an injured Kenny Clark, where he produced 3 "stops", tackles that were determined to be a failure for the opposing offense.

=== Cincinnati Bengals ===
On March 13, 2025, Slaton signed a two-year contract with the Cincinnati Bengals.

== NFL career statistics ==
Legend
| **Bold** | Career high |

=== Regular season ===
| Year | Team | Games | | Tackles | | | | | Fumbles | | |
| Year | Team | GP | GS | Total | Solo | Ast | Sck | TFL | FF | FR | PD |
|---|---|---|---|---|---|---|---|---|---|---|---|
| 2021 | GB | **17** | 0 | 23 | 14 | 9 | 1.0 | 0 | 0 | 0 | 0 |
| 2022 | GB | **17** | 2 | 31 | 15 | 16 | 0.0 | 2 | 0 | 0 | **2** |
| 2023 | GB | **17** | **17** | 50 | **23** | 27 | 0.0 | 2 | 0 | 0 | **2** |
| 2024 | GB | **17** | **17** | 30 | 15 | 15 | 1.0 | 2 | 0 | 0 | 0 |
| 2025 | CIN | **17** | **17** | **52** | 19 | **33** | **3.0** | **4** | 0 | 0 | 0 |
| Total | | 85 | 53 | 186 | 86 | 100 | 5.0 | 10 | 0 | 0 | 4 |
Source: pro-football-reference.com

=== Postseason ===
| Year | Team | Games | | Tackles | | | | | Fumbles | | |
| Year | Team | GP | GS | Total | Solo | Ast | Sck | TFL | FF | FR | PD |
|---|---|---|---|---|---|---|---|---|---|---|---|
| 2021 | GB | 1 | 0 | 1 | 1 | 0 | 0.0 | **1** | 0 | 0 | 0 |
| 2023 | GB | **2** | **2** | **6** | **4** | **2** | 0.0 | 0 | 0 | 0 | 0 |
| 2024 | GB | 1 | 1 | 3 | 2 | 1 | 0.0 | **1** | 0 | 0 | 0 |
| Total | | 4 | 3 | 10 | 7 | 3 | 0.0 | 2 | 0 | 0 | 0 |
Source: pro-football-reference.com
