= Karl Brooks =

American football player (born 2000)

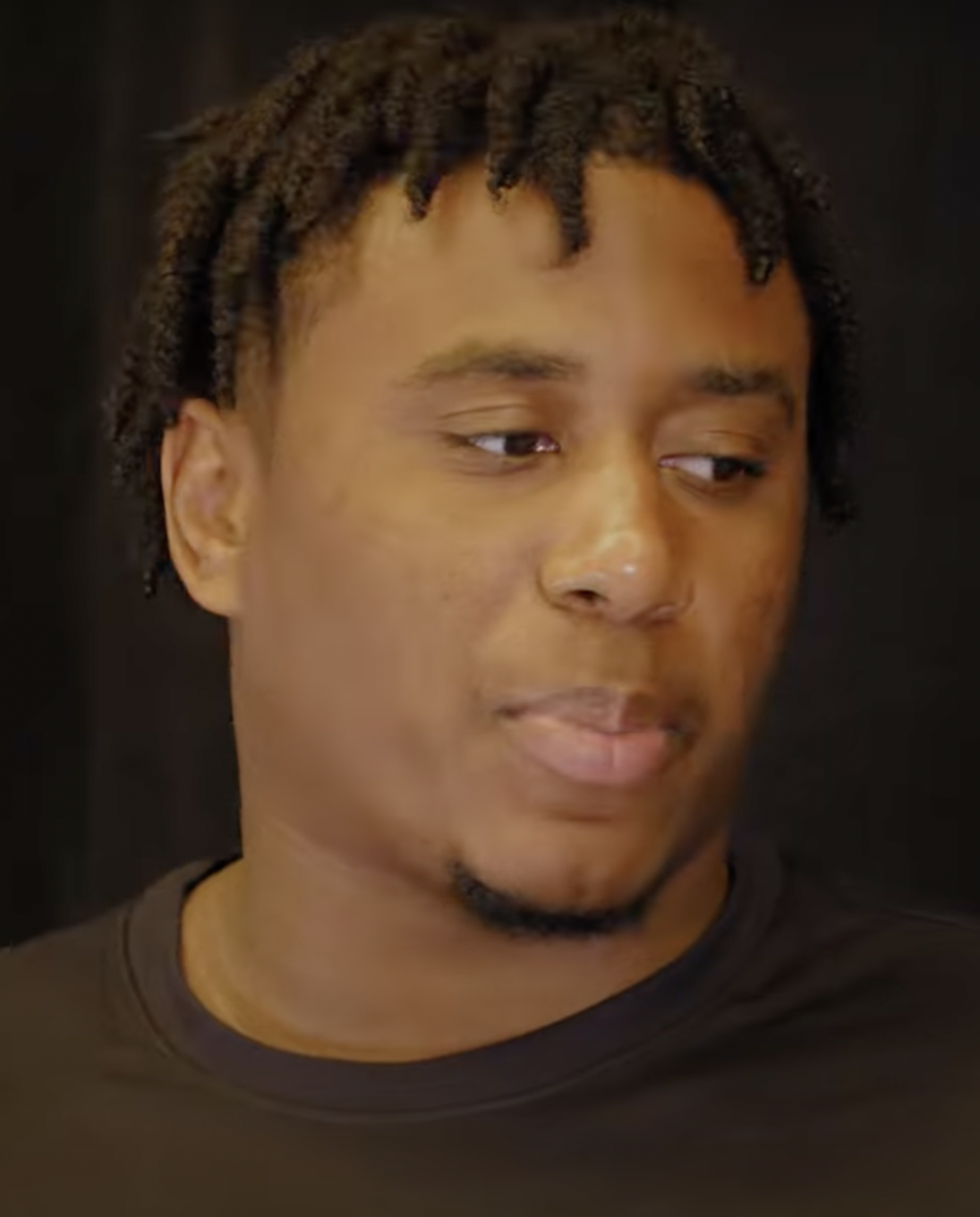
- Brooks in 2023

No. 94 – Green Bay Packers
- Position: Defensive tackle
- Roster status: Active

Personal information
- Born: May 8, 2000 (age 26); Lansing, Michigan, U.S.
- Listed height: 6 ft 3 in (1.91 m)
- Listed weight: 296 lb (134 kg)

Career information
- High school: J. W. Sexton (Lansing)
- College: Bowling Green (2018–2022)
- NFL draft: 2023: 6th round, 179th overall pick

Career history
- Green Bay Packers (2023–present)

Awards and highlights
- First-team All-MAC (2022); Third-team All-MAC (2021)

Career NFL statistics as of Week 10, 2026
- Total tackles: 90
- Sacks: 11
- Forced fumbles: 2
- Fumble recoveries: 5
- Pass deflections: 7
- Stats at Pro Football Reference

Karl Dermarad Brooks (born May 8, 2000) is an American professional football defensive tackle for the Green Bay Packers of the National Football League (NFL). He played college football for the Bowling Green Falcons.

== Early life ==
Brooks grew up in Lansing, Michigan, and went to J. W. Sexton High School. He initially committed to play college football at Division II Grand Valley State but later changed his commitment to Bowling Green after receiving a later offer from the program.

== College career ==
In his collegiate career Brooks totaled 167 tackles, 46 being for a loss, 27.5 sacks, one interception, five pass deflections, five forced fumbles, and a fumble recovery. In the 2021 season he was named third team all-Mid-American Conference (MAC). His best collegiate year occurred in 2022 where he recorded 50 tackles, 18 going for a loss, 10 sacks, four pass deflections, a fumble recovery, and two forced fumbles. He was also named first-team all-MAC.

Brooks was projected to be a fourth to fifth round pick in the 2023 NFL draft.

== Professional career ==
Pre-draft measurables
Height	Weight	Arm length	Hand span	Wingspan	40-yard dash	10-yard split	20-yard split	20-yard shuttle	Three-cone drill	Vertical jump	Broad jump	Bench press
6 ft 3 3/8 in (1.91 m)	303 lb (137 kg)	31 1/2 in (0.80 m)	9 1/8 in (0.23 m)	6 ft 5 1/4 in (1.96 m)	5.09 s	1.77 s	2.95 s	5.00 s	7.63 s	26.5 in (0.67 m)	8 ft 9 in (2.67 m)	28 reps
All values from Pro Day

Brooks was selected in the sixth round, 179th overall, by the Green Bay Packers in the 2023 NFL draft. He signed his rookie contract on May 5.

On November 17, 2024, against divisional rivals the Chicago Bears in Week 11, Brooks blocked Chicago's game-winning field goal attempt from kicker Cairo Santos as time expired in regulation to preserve a Packers' 20–19 victory and improve their record to 7–3. For this, Brooks was named NFC Special Teams Player of the Week. His field goal block prevented the Packers from finishing 0–6 against the NFC North division, as they went on to finish the season 1–5 against the division (including a loss to the Bears on a successful game-winning field goal).

== Career statistics ==
=== NFL ===
Legend
**Bold**	Career high

==== Regular season ====
Year	Team	Games		Tackles					Fumbles		
Year	Team	GP	GS	Total	Solo	Ast	Sck	TFL	FF	FR	PD
2023	GB	17	0	20	12	8	**4.0**	**6**	**1**	2	**4**
2024	GB	17	0	24	**14**	10	3.5	4	**1**	**3**	2
2025	GB	16	7	**28**	8	**20**	0.5	1	0	0	1
Career		50	7	72	34	38	8.0	11	2	5	7
Source: pro-football-reference.com

==== Postseason ====
Year	Team	Games		Tackles					Fumbles		
Year	Team	GP	GS	Total	Solo	Ast	Sck	TFL	FF	FR	PD
2023	GB	2	0	**3**	0	**3**	0.0	0	0	0	0
2024	GB	1	0	1	**1**	0	0.0	0	0	0	0
2025	GB	1	1	0	0	0	0.0	0	0	0	0
Career		4	1	4	1	3	0.0	0	0	0	0
Source: pro-football-reference.com

=== College ===
Season	Team	GP	Tackles				Interceptions					Fumbles	
Season	Team	GP	Cmb	Solo	Ast	Sck	Int	Yds	Avg	TD	PD	FF	FR
2018	Bowling Green	12	32	13	19	3.5	0	0	0.0	0	0	1	0
2019	Bowling Green	12	33	16	17	4.5	1	33	33.0	0	1	2	0
2020	Bowling Green	3	10	3	7	2.0	0	0	0.0	0	0	0	0
2021	Bowling Green	12	42	15	27	7.5	0	0	0.0	0	0	0	0
2022	Bowling Green	13	50	30	20	10.0	0	0	0.0	0	4	2	1
Career		52	167	77	90	27.5	1	33	33.0	0	5	5	1
Source: sports-reference.com
