= Jayden Reed =

American football player (born 2000)

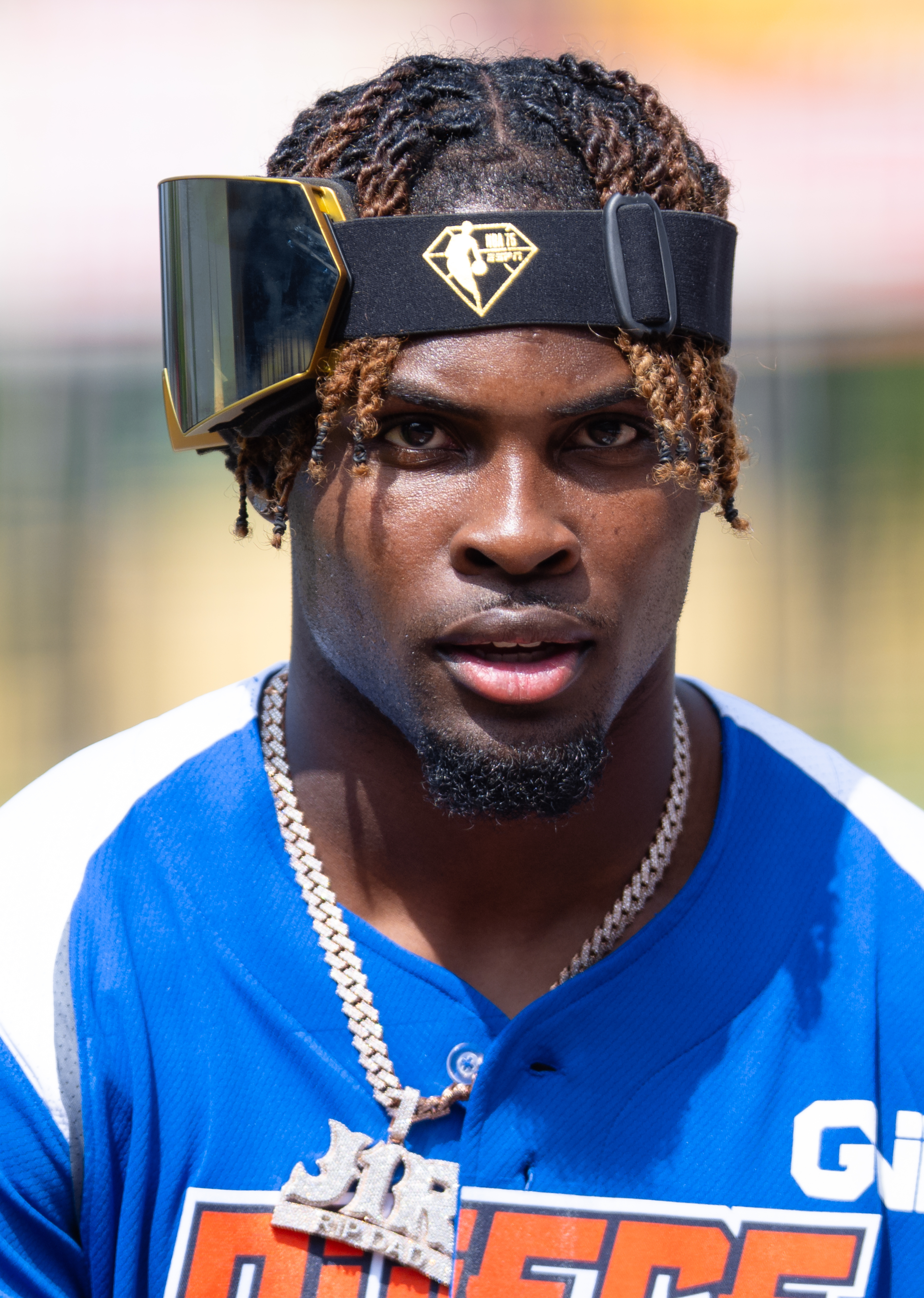
- Reed in 2023

No. 11 – Green Bay Packers
- Position: Wide receiver
- Roster status: Injured reserve

Personal information
- Born: April 28, 2000 (age 26); Naperville, Illinois, U.S.
- Listed height: 5 ft 11 in (1.80 m)
- Listed weight: 187 lb (85 kg)

Career information
- High school: Naperville Central
- College: Western Michigan (2018); Michigan State (2019–2022)
- NFL draft: 2023: 2nd round, 50th overall pick

Career history
- Green Bay Packers (2023–present)

Awards and highlights
- 2× Second-team All-Big Ten (2021, 2022); Second-team All-MAC (2018)

Career NFL statistics as of 2026
- Receptions: 142
- Receiving yards: 1,881
- Receiving touchdowns: 15
- Rushing yards: 310
- Rushing touchdowns: 3
- Return yards: 225
- Stats at Pro Football Reference

Jayden Kevon Reed (born April 28, 2000) is an American professional football wide receiver for the Green Bay Packers of the National Football League (NFL). He played college football for the Western Michigan Broncos and the Michigan State Spartans. He was selected by the Packers in the second round of the 2023 NFL draft.

== Early life ==
Reed grew up in Aurora, Illinois. He initially attended Metea Valley High School, where he played basketball. He also played football with Michigan State teammate Payton Thorne. As a junior, he caught 23 passes for 403 yards and four touchdowns. Along with Thorne, he transferred to Naperville Central High School before the beginning of his senior year.

== College career ==
=== Western Michigan ===
Reed began his collegiate career at Western Michigan. He was named a freshman All-American by the Football Writers Association of America after catching 56 passes for 797 yards and eight touchdowns. After the season, Reed announced that he would be leaving the program.

=== Michigan State ===
Reed ultimately chose to transfer to Michigan State.

Reed sat out and redshirted his first season at Michigan State due to NCAA transfer rules. As a redshirt sophomore, he started all seven of Michigan State's games in the team's COVID-19-shortened 2020 season and had a team-high 33 receptions for 407 yards and three touchdowns. Reed also returned 16 kickoffs for 329 yards and two punts for 14 yards and was named honorable mention All-Big Ten Conference as a return specialist. He was named the Big Ten Special Teams Player of the Week for Week 4 of his redshirt junior season after returning a punt 62 yards for a touchdown and two kickoffs for 69 yards in a 23–20 overtime win against Nebraska. Reed won the 2021 Peach Bowl MVP after beating Pittsburgh by the score of 31–21.

=== College statistics ===
Year	Team	GP	Receiving				Rushing			
Year	Team	GP	Rec	Yds	Avg	TD	Att	Yds	Avg	TD
2018	Western Michigan	12	56	797	14.2	8	1	−9	−9.0	0
2019	Michigan State	Ineligible due to NCAA transfer rule								
2020	Michigan State	7	33	407	12.3	3	6	17	2.8	0
2021	Michigan State	13	59	1,026	17.4	10	7	34	4.9	1
2022	Michigan State	11	55	636	11.6	5	4	11	2.8	0
Career		43	203	2,866	14.1	26	18	53	2.9	1
Source: sports-reference.com

== Professional career ==
Pre-draft measurables
Height	Weight	Arm length	Hand span	Wingspan	40-yard dash	10-yard split	20-yard split	20-yard shuttle	Vertical jump	Broad jump	Bench press
5 ft 10 7/8 in (1.80 m)	187 lb (85 kg)	30 1/2 in (0.77 m)	9 1/8 in (0.23 m)	6 ft 1 1/8 in (1.86 m)	4.45 s	1.57 s	2.55 s	4.29 s	33.5 in (0.85 m)	10 ft 1 in (3.07 m)	13 reps
All values from NFL Combine/Pro Day

Reed was selected in the second round, 50th overall, by the Green Bay Packers in the 2023 NFL draft. He signed his rookie contract on July 20, 2023.

Reed made his NFL debut on September 10, 2023, catching two passes for 48 yards and rushing once for −2 yards in a 38–20 win against the Chicago Bears. He scored his first two NFL touchdowns on September 17 in a 25–24 loss to the Atlanta Falcons, on nine- and 10-yard passes from Jordan Love. In week 18, he had four receptions for 112 yards in a win over the Bears. As a rookie, he appeared in 16 games and started 13. He finished with 64 receptions for 793 yards and eight touchdowns, while also rushing for 119 yards on 11 carries with two touchdowns.

In Week 1 of the 2024 season, against the Eagles, Reed had four receptions for 138 yards and a 70-yard receiving touchdown to go with a 33-yard rushing touchdown in the 34–29 loss.

In Week 2 of the 2025 season, Reed suffered a fractured collarbone during the first quarter of a Thursday Night Football game against the Washington Commanders. The injury happened as Reed was catching a touchdown pass (the touchdown got overturned due to a holding call on right tackle Anthony Belton) while Commanders safety Quan Martin fell on Reed's right shoulder, and was expected to be out for 6–8 weeks. On September 17, Reed underwent surgeries to repair a broken clavicle and a Jones fracture in his left foot. He was activated from injured reserve on December 6, ahead of the team's Week 14 matchup against the Chicago Bears.

On April 24, 2026, the Packers signed Reed to a three-year contract extension worth $50.25 million. On September 20, Reed suffered a season-ending neck injury while playing against the New York Jets and was placed on injured-reserve for the duration of the year.

== NFL career statistics ==
Legend
**Bold**	Career high

=== Regular season ===
Year	Team	Games		Receiving					Rushing					Fumbles	
Year	Team	GP	GS	Rec	Yds	Y/R	Lng	TD	Att	Yds	Y/A	Lng	TD	Fum	Lost
2023	GB	16	13	64	793	12.4	59	8	11	119	**10.8**	32	**2**	2	1
2024	GB	**17**	10	55	**857**	**15.6**	**70**	6	**20**	**163**	8.1	**33**	1	**3**	1
2025	GB	7	3	19	207	10.9	31	1	3	28	9.3	15	0	0	0
Career		40	26	138	1,857	13.5	70T	15	34	310	9.1	33T	3	5	2
Source: pro-football-reference.com

=== Postseason ===
Year	Team	Games		Receiving					Rushing					Fumbles	
Year	Team	GP	GS	Rec	Yds	Y/R	Lng	TD	Att	Yds	Y/A	Lng	TD	Fum	Lost
2023	GB	**2**	1	4	35	8.8	**27**	0	**1**	9	9.0	9	0	0	0
2024	GB	1	1	4	**46**	**11.5**	20	0	0	0	0.0	0	0	0	0
2025	GB	1	1	4	43	10.8	20	**1**	1	**14**	**14.0**	**14**	0	0	0
Career		4	3	12	124	10.3	27	1	2	23	11.5	14	0	0	0
Source: pro-football-reference.com
