= Kingsley Enagbare =

American football player (born 2000)

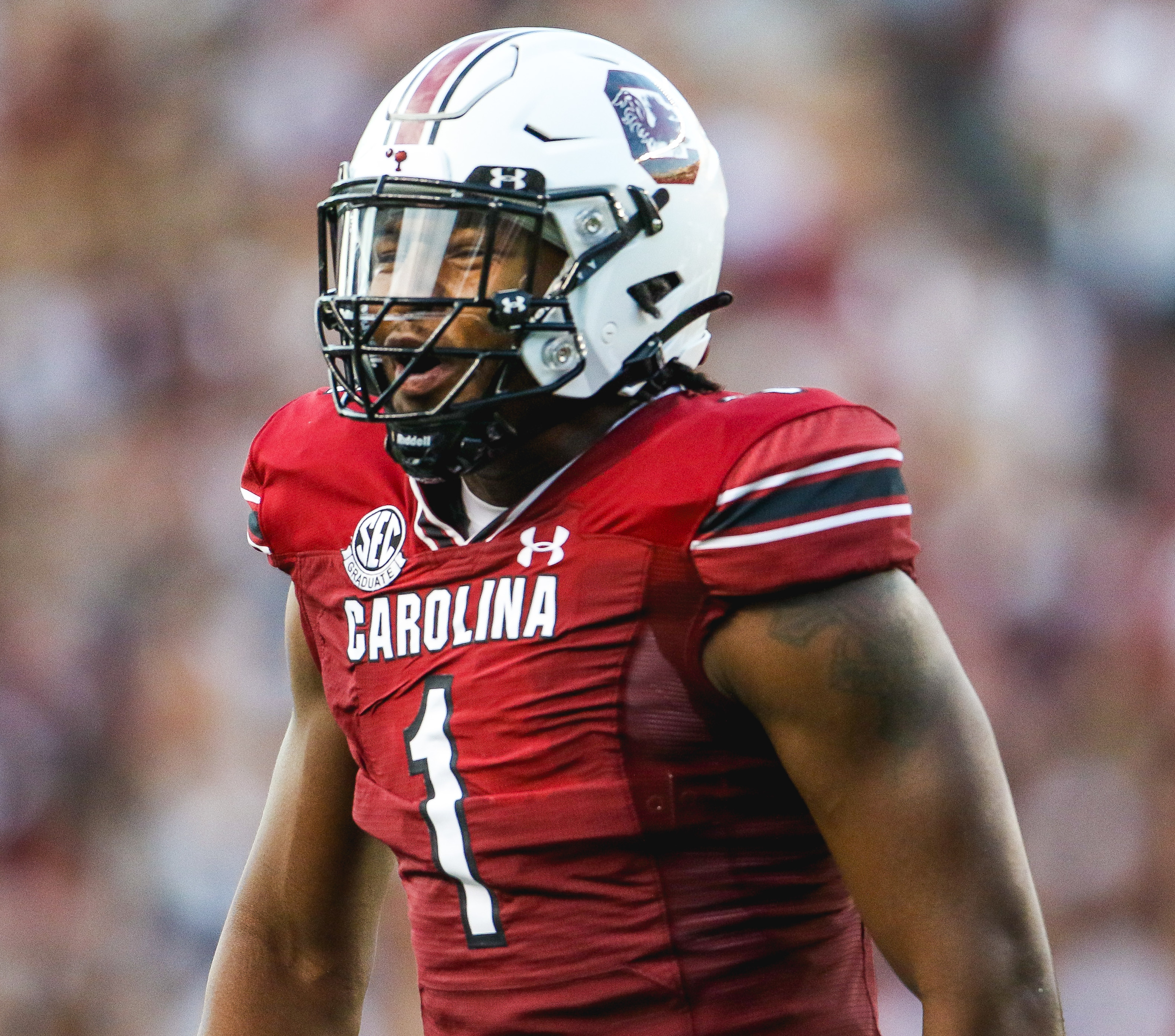
- Enagbare in college at South Carolina in 2021

No. 52 – New York Jets
- Position: Defensive end
- Roster status: Active

Personal information
- Born: January 18, 2000 (age 26); Atlanta, Georgia, U.S.
- Listed height: 6 ft 4 in (1.93 m)
- Listed weight: 258 lb (117 kg)

Career information
- High school: Hapeville Charter Academy (Atlanta)
- College: South Carolina (2018–2021)
- NFL draft: 2022: 5th round, 179th overall pick

Career history
- Green Bay Packers (2022–2025); New York Jets (2026–present)

Awards and highlights
- First-team All-SEC (2020)

Career NFL statistics as of 2025
- Total tackles: 146
- Sacks: 11.5
- Forced fumbles: 3
- Fumble recoveries: 1
- Pass deflections: 4
- Stats at Pro Football Reference

Kingsley Osagie "JJ" Enagbare (born January 18, 2000) is an American professional football defensive end for the New York Jets of the National Football League (NFL). He played college football for the South Carolina Gamecocks.

== Early life ==
Enagbare grew up in Suwanee, Georgia and attended Peachtree Ridge High School before transferring to Hapeville Charter Academy in Atlanta during his junior year. He was named the Class AA Defensive Player of the Year by The Atlanta Journal-Constitution as a senior. Enagbare committed to play college football at South Carolina shortly before the start of his senior season. He is of Nigerian descent.

== College career ==
Enagbare joined the Gamecocks as an early enrollee and was moved from defensive end to defensive tackle during spring practices. He played in 12 games and finished his freshman season with 20 tackles with three tackles for loss and one sack. He moved back to defensive end as a sophomore and recorded 27 tackles, seven tackles for loss, and 3.5 sacks. As a junior, Enagbare had 30 tackles, seven tackles for loss, and six sacks with three forced fumbles and was named first-team All-Southeastern Conference by the league's coaches and was a second-team selection by the Associated Press.

== Professional career ==
Pre-draft measurables
Height	Weight	Arm length	Hand span	Wingspan	40-yard dash	10-yard split	20-yard split	20-yard shuttle	Three-cone drill	Vertical jump	Broad jump
6 ft 3 3/4 in (1.92 m)	258 lb (117 kg)	34 3/4 in (0.88 m)	10 5/8 in (0.27 m)	6 ft 11 in (2.11 m)	4.87 s	1.72 s	2.81 s	4.54 s	7.51 s	36.5 in (0.93 m)	9 ft 10 in (3.00 m)
All values from NFL Combine/Pro Day

=== Green Bay Packers ===
Enagbare was selected by the Green Bay Packers in the fifth round (179th overall) of the 2022 NFL draft. On May 6, 2022, he signed his rookie contract. On October 16, Enagbare recorded his first career sack on Zach Wilson during a Week 6 loss to the New York Jets.

=== New York Jets ===
On March 12, 2026, Enagbare signed a one-year, $10 million contract with the New York Jets.

== NFL career statistics ==
Legend
**Bold**	Career high

=== Regular season ===
Year	Team	Games		Tackles						Interceptions						Fumbles	
Year	Team	GP	GS	Cmb	Solo	Ast	Sck	TFL	Sfty	PD	Int	Yds	Avg	Lng	TD	FF	FR
2022	GB	17	7	31	18	13	3.0	5	0	**3**	0	0	0	0	0	0	0
2023	GB	17	4	37	**27**	10	2.0	**8**	0	1	0	0	0	0	0	1	**1**
2024	GB	17	7	**39**	18	21	**4.5**	6	0	0	0	0	0	0	0	**2**	0
2025	GB	17	3	**39**	16	**23**	2.0	6	0	0	0	0	0	0	0	0	0
Total		68	21	146	79	67	11.5	25	0	4	0	0	0	0	0	3	1
Source: pro-football-reference.com

=== Postseason ===
Year	Team	Games		Tackles						Interceptions						Fumbles	
Year	Team	GP	GS	Cmb	Solo	Ast	Sck	TFL	Sfty	PD	Int	Yds	Avg	Lng	TD	FF	FR
2023	GB	1	0	1	1	0	0.0	0	0	0	0	0	0	0	0	0	0
2024	GB	1	1	**4**	2	**2**	0.0	0	0	0	0	0	0	0	0	0	0
2025	GB	1	1	**4**	**3**	1	0.0	**1**	0	0	0	0	0	0	0	0	0
Total		3	2	9	6	3	0.0	1	0	0	0	0	0	0	0	0	0
Source: pro-football-reference.com
