= Messiah Swinson =

American football player (born 2000)

Profile
- Position: Tight end

Personal information
- Born: April 20, 2000 (age 26); Bay Shore, New York, U.S.
- Listed height: 6 ft 7 in (2.01 m)
- Listed weight: 259 lb (117 kg)

Career information
- High school: Long Island Lutheran (Brookville, New York)
- College: Missouri (2018–2021); Arizona State (2022–2023)
- NFL draft: 2024: undrafted

Career history
- Green Bay Packers (2024)*; Carolina Panthers (2024); Green Bay Packers (2024–2025)*; San Francisco 49ers (2025)*; Arizona Cardinals (2025)*; Green Bay Packers (2025)*; Cleveland Browns (2026)*
- * Offseason or practice squad member only
- Stats at Pro Football Reference

Messiah Swinson (born April 20, 2000) is an American professional football tight end. He played college football for the Arizona State Sun Devils and Missouri Tigers.

== Early life ==
Swinson attended high school at Long Island Lutheran located in Brookville, New York. Coming out of high school, Swinson was rated as a three-star recruit, and he committed to play college football for the Missouri Tigers.

== College career ==
=== Missouri ===
In Swinson's four-year career with Missouri, from 2018 to 2021, he played in 23 games and totaled seven receptions for 84 yards. After the conclusion of the 2021 season, Swinson decided to enter his name into the NCAA transfer portal.

=== Arizona State ===
Swinson decided to transfer to play for the Arizona State Sun Devils. During Swinson's two-year career at Arizona State in 2022 and 2023, he appeared in 24 games, notching 21 receptions for 233 yards and two touchdowns.

== Professional career ==
Pre-draft measurables
Height	Weight	Arm length	Hand span	Wingspan	40-yard dash	10-yard split	20-yard split	20-yard shuttle	Three-cone drill	Vertical jump	Broad jump	Bench press
6 ft 7 1/8 in (2.01 m)	259 lb (117 kg)	34 1/8 in (0.87 m)	10 3/4 in (0.27 m)	6 ft 10 3/4 in (2.10 m)	4.87 s	1.77 s	2.91 s	4.77 s	7.63 s	28 in (0.71 m)	8 ft 7 in (2.62 m)	15 reps
All values from Pro Day

=== Green Bay Packers (first stint) ===
After not being selected in the 2024 NFL draft, Swinson signed with the Green Bay Packers as an undrafted free agent.

=== Carolina Panthers ===
On September 3, 2024, the Carolina Panthers signed Swinson to their active roster off the Packers practice squad. He was waived on September 24.

=== Green Bay Packers (second stint) ===
On September 26, 2024, Swinson signed with the Packers practice squad. He signed a reserve/future contract with Green Bay on January 13. On August 26, 2025, Swinson was released by the Packers as part of final roster cuts.

=== San Francisco 49ers ===
On September 10, 2025, Swinson was signed to the San Francisco 49ers' practice squad. He was released on October 21.

=== Arizona Cardinals ===
On October 30, 2025, Swinson signed with the Arizona Cardinals' practice squad. He was released on December 30.

=== Green Bay Packers (third stint) ===
On January 6, 2026, Swinson was signed to the Green Bay Packers' practice squad. He signed a reserve/future contract with Green Bay on January 12. On August 30, Swinson was released by the Packers as a part of final roster cuts.

=== Cleveland Browns ===
On September 1, 2026, Swinson signed with the Cleveland Browns' practice squad. On September 29, he was released.
