= Peter Bowden =

American football player (born 2001)

Profile
- Position: Long snapper

Personal information
- Born: January 24, 2001 (age 25); San Diego, California, U.S.
- Listed height: 6 ft 2 in (1.88 m)
- Listed weight: 239 lb (108 kg)

Career information
- High school: Francis Parker (San Diego)
- College: Wisconsin (2019–2023)
- NFL draft: 2024: undrafted

Career history
- Green Bay Packers (2024)*; Jacksonville Jaguars (2024)*; Michigan Panthers (2025); Los Angeles Chargers (2025–2026)*
- * Offseason or practice squad member only
- Stats at Pro Football Reference

Peter Bowden (born January 24, 2001) is an American professional football long snapper. He played college football for the Wisconsin Badgers and was signed by the Green Bay Packers as an undrafted free agent in 2024.

== Early life and education ==
Bowden was born January 24, 2001, and is from San Diego, California. He attended Francis Parker School in San Diego. As a freshman, he began long snapping to help his cousin, punter Ryan Sanborn, produce film for recruiters; Sanborn would later sign with the Atlanta Falcons in 2024.

Bowden met with the football team and later that year became the starter on the varsity due to injuries, remaining in that position for the rest of his time at Francis Parker. He also played other positions for the team, including on the offensive line and on defense, recording 63 tackles and 6.0 sacks in his senior year. He was football team captain and was successful on all 227 snaps in his career; he also played three years of baseball. He was ranked a five-star prospect by Chris Rubio's long snapping camp and by Kohl's kicking. He walked-on to play college football for the Wisconsin Badgers.

Bowden redshirted in 2019, then saw no playing time in 2020 as a backup to Adam Bay. He was awarded an athletic scholarship in 2020. He won the starting job in 2021 and appeared in all 13 games that season. He played all 13 games in 2022 and was named a semifinalist for the Patrick Mannelly Award, given to the nation's best long snapper. He contemplated whether to enter the 2023 NFL draft, but opted to stay in college so that he would be able to graduate. He again appeared in all 13 games, being selected one of three finalists for the Patrick Mannelly Award. He declared for the NFL draft after the season and ended with 39 career games played. He was invited to the 2024 Senior Bowl.

== Professional career ==
Pre-draft measurables
| Height | Weight | Arm length | Hand span | Wingspan | 40-yard dash | 10-yard split | 20-yard split | 20-yard shuttle | Vertical jump | Broad jump | Bench press |
|---|---|---|---|---|---|---|---|---|---|---|---|
| 6 ft 2 3/8 in (1.89 m) | 239 lb (108 kg) | 30 1/4 in (0.77 m) | 8 3/4 in (0.22 m) | 6 ft 3 1/4 in (1.91 m) | 5.10 s | 1.84 s | 2.94 s | 4.72 s | 32.0 in (0.81 m) | 9 ft 2 in (2.79 m) | 18 reps |
All values from Pro Day

=== Green Bay Packers ===
Entering the 2024 NFL draft, Dane Brugler of The Athletic ranked Bowden as the best long snapper available and the only one with a draftable grade. After going unselected in the draft, he was signed by the Green Bay Packers as an undrafted free agent. He was released on July 23, 2024 and re-signed back with the team a week later. Bowden was released again on August 14.

=== Jacksonville Jaguars ===
On November 5, 2024, Bowden was signed to the Jacksonville Jaguars' practice squad, but released a week later.

=== Michigan Panthers ===
Bowden signed with the Michigan Panthers of the UFL on April 23, 2025.

=== Los Angeles Chargers ===
On November 5, 2025, Bowden was signed to the Los Angeles Chargers' practice squad, but was released a week later. He signed a reserve/futures contract with Los Angeles on January 13, 2026. On May 14, Bowden was waived by the Chargers. On July 28, he was re-signed by the Chargers. Bowden was waived by Los Angeles as a part of final roster cute on August 30.
