= Don Callis (Canadian football) =

American gridiron football player (born 2001)

- Callis with the Montreal Alouettes in 2026

No. 21 – Montreal Alouettes
- Position: Defensive back
- Roster status: Active
- CFL status: American

Personal information
- Born: April 15, 2001 (age 25)
- Listed height: 6 ft 0 in (1.83 m)
- Listed weight: 181 lb (82 kg)

Career information
- High school: The Colony (The Colony, Texas)
- College: East Central (2019–2022); Troy (2023)
- NFL draft: 2024: undrafted

Career history
- Green Bay Packers (2024)*; Montreal Alouettes (2025–present)
- * Offseason or practice squad member only

Awards and highlights
- Second-team All-GAC (2022)
- Stats at CFL.ca

Donovan Callis (born April 15, 2001) is an American professional football defensive back for the Montreal Alouettes of the Canadian Football League (CFL). He played college football at East Central and Troy.

== Early life ==
Donovan Callis was born on April 15, 2001. He grew up in Los Angeles. He played high school football at The Colony High School in The Colony, Texas. As a senior, Callis earned first-team all-district honors at cornerback and helped The Colony win the district title.

== College career ==
Callis first played college football for the East Central Tigers of East Central University. He played in nine games, starting five, as a true freshman in 2019, recording 14 solo tackles, ten assisted tackles, one interception, and one pass breakup. He appeared in one game in 2020, posting two solo tackles and one pass breakup, before the rest of the season was cancelled due to the COVID-19 pandemic. Callis played in seven games in 2021, totaling 14 solo tackles, five assisted tackles, and eight pass breakups. He played in ten games during his redshirt junior year in 2022, recording 32 tackles, two interceptions, seven pass breakups, three forced fumble, and two fumble recoveries. He was named second-team All-Great American Conference for his performance during the 2022 season. Callis majored in kinesiology at East Central.

In 2023, Callis transferred to play for the Troy Trojans of Troy University. He played in 13 games during the 2023 season, totaling 13 solo tackles, 13 assisted tackles, one sack, four pass breakups, one forced fumble, and one fumble recovery that he returned for a touchdown. He majored in interdisciplinary studies at Troy, and graduated with a bachelor's in July 2024.

== Professional career ==
Pre-draft measurables
Height	Weight	Arm length	Hand span	Wingspan	40-yard dash	10-yard split	20-yard split	20-yard shuttle	Three-cone drill	Vertical jump	Broad jump	Bench press
5 ft 10 1/4 in (1.78 m)	174 lb (79 kg)	30 3/4 in (0.78 m)	9 in (0.23 m)	6 ft 2 in (1.88 m)	4.44 s	1.52 s	2.57 s	4.46 s	7.70 s	33.5 in (0.85 m)	9 ft 11 in (3.02 m)	7 reps
All values from Troy's Pro Day

He was rated the 145th best cornerback in the 2024 NFL draft by Dane Brugler of The New York Times. After going undrafted in the 2024 NFL draft, Callis attended rookie minicamp on a tryout basis with both the San Francisco 49ers and Green Bay Packers in May 2024. He signed with the Packers a few months later on July 30, 2024. Before signing with Green Bay, he had been working as a lawn mower for $11 per hour. Callis was waived/injured on August 7, and reverted to injured reserve the next day. He was waived from injured reserve with an injury settlement on August 13, 2024.

Callis signed with the Montreal Alouettes of the Canadian Football League on April 14, 2025. He was moved to the practice roster on June 1. Callis attracted some attention due to his last name sounding the same as the Quebec French profanity câlice. In July, the Alouettes held a photo op and jersey giveaway featuring a jersey that had been signed by both Callis and the Canadian professional wrestling manager of the same name, Don Callis. The contest ended on July 10, and Callis was released by Montreal the next day, with the Alouettes tweeting "Marketing team is devastated". However, Callis was later signed to Montreal's active roster on August 5, 2025, after injuries in the team's secondary. He made his CFL debut on August 8 against the Edmonton Elks.
