= Edgerrin Cooper =

American football player (born 2001)

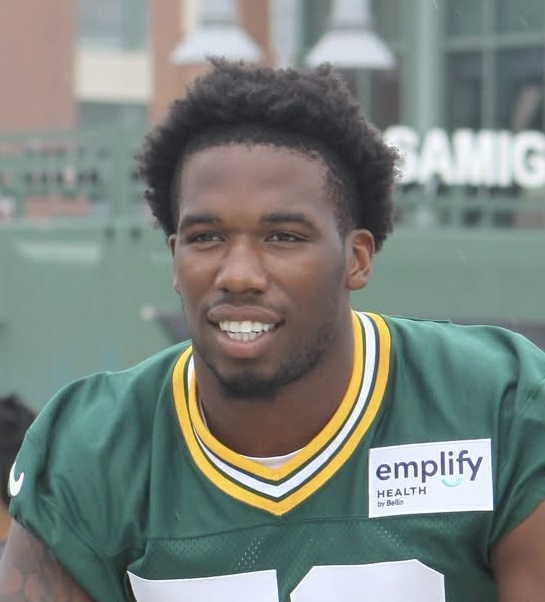
- Cooper with the Green Bay Packers in 2025

No. 56 – Green Bay Packers
- Position: Linebacker
- Roster status: Injured reserve

Personal information
- Born: November 17, 2001 (age 24); Covington, Louisiana, U.S.
- Listed height: 6 ft 2 in (1.88 m)
- Listed weight: 229 lb (104 kg)

Career information
- High school: Covington
- College: Texas A&M (2020–2023)
- NFL draft: 2024: 2nd round, 45th overall pick

Career history
- Green Bay Packers (2024–present)

Awards and highlights
- PFWA All-Rookie Team (2024); Consensus All-American (2023); First-team All-SEC (2023)

Career NFL statistics as of 2026
- Total tackles: 235
- Sacks: 7
- Forced fumbles: 3
- Fumble recoveries: 3
- Pass deflections: 9
- Interceptions: 2
- Stats at Pro Football Reference

Edgerrin Cooper (born November 17, 2001) is an American professional football linebacker for the Green Bay Packers of the National Football League (NFL). He played college football for the Texas A&M Aggies, being named a consensus All-American in 2023, and was selected by the Packers in the second round of the 2024 NFL draft.

== Early life ==
Cooper, named after Edgerrin James was born in Covington, Louisiana, and attended high school at Covington. In Cooper's senior season of high school, he notched 118 tackles with 22 being for a loss, two sacks, and five touchdowns on offense. Cooper would decide to commit to play college football for the Texas A&M Aggies.

== College career ==
In Cooper's first season in the 2020 COVID shortened year, he recorded two tackles in two games. Cooper would have a breakout season in 2021, notching 58 tackles with 5.5 going for a loss, half a sack, a pass deflection, and an interception. For his performance on the 2021 season, he was named to the SEC All Freshman Team. In the Aggies 2022 season finale, Cooper forced a fumble, as he helped Texas A&M end their season with a win, beating LSU. He finished the 2022 season with 61 tackles with eight being for a loss, five pass deflections, an interception, a fumble recovery, and a forced fumble. Cooper returned to the Aggies for the 2023 season as one of their top defenders, notching his best performance versus Alabama where he had 11 tackles with three going for a loss, and three sacks.

== Professional career ==
Pre-draft measurables
Height	Weight	Arm length	Hand span	Wingspan	40-yard dash	10-yard split	20-yard split	20-yard shuttle	Three-cone drill	Vertical jump	Broad jump
6 ft 2 1/8 in (1.88 m)	230 lb (104 kg)	34 in (0.86 m)	9 3/4 in (0.25 m)	6 ft 8 1/4 in (2.04 m)	4.51 s	1.54 s	2.64 s	4.29 s	7.19 s	34.5 in (0.88 m)	10 ft 0 in (3.05 m)
All values from NFL Combine/Pro Day

Cooper was selected with the 45th overall pick of the 2024 NFL draft by the Green Bay Packers. On May 23, 2024, he signed his rookie contract.

Making his first start, he was named Week 8 NFC Defensive Player of the Week after recording eight tackles, a sack, a forced fumble and a pass breakup in a 30–27 win over the Jacksonville Jaguars. In Week 15 against the Seattle Seahawks, returning from a hamstring injury that caused him to miss three weeks, Cooper had a team-leading seven tackles, two tackles for loss, a sack, two pass deflections and an interception off Seahawks backup quarterback Sam Howell in a 30–13 win, earning NFC Defensive Player of the Week. He was named to the PFWA All-Rookie Team.

On October 4, 2026, during Week 4 against the Buccaneers, Cooper suffered a non-contact injury during the third quarter. On the day following the game, an MRI confirmed that he tore his Achilles, ending his season.

== NFL career statistics ==
Legend
**Bold**	Career high

=== Regular season ===
Year	Team	Games		Tackles						Interceptions						Fumbles			
Year	Team	GP	GS	Cmb	Solo	Ast	Sck	TFL	Sfty	PD	Int	Yds	Avg	Lng	TD	FF	FR	Yds	TD
2024	GB	14	4	87	57	30	**3.5**	**13**	0	**4**	**1**	**22**	**22.0**	**22**	0	1	**2**	**4**	0
2025	GB	16	16	**118**	**63**	**55**	0.5	4	0	**4**	0	0	0.0	0	0	**2**	1	0	0
2026	GB	4	4	30	18	12	3.0	6	0	1	**1**	18	18.0	18	0	0	0	0	0
Career		34	24	235	138	97	7.0	23	0	9	2	40	20.0	22	0	3	3	4	0
Source: pro-football-reference.com

=== Postseason ===
Year	Team	Games		Tackles						Interceptions						Fumbles			
Year	Team	GP	GS	Cmb	Solo	Ast	Sck	TFL	Sfty	PD	Int	Yds	Avg	Lng	TD	FF	FR	Yds	TD
2024	GB	1	1	7	2	**5**	0.0	0	0	0	0	0	0.0	0	0	0	0	0	0
2025	GB	1	1	**8**	**6**	2	0.0	0	0	**1**	0	0	0.0	0	0	0	0	0	0
Career		2	2	15	8	7	0.0	0	0	1	0	0	0.0	0	0	0	0	0	0
Source: pro-football-reference.com
