= Donovan Jennings =

American football player (born 1999)

No. 67 – Green Bay Packers
- Position: Guard
- Roster status: Active

Personal information
- Born: November 24, 1999 (age 26); Tampa, Florida, U.S.
- Listed height: 6 ft 4 in (1.93 m)
- Listed weight: 323 lb (147 kg)

Career information
- High school: Gaither (Tampa, Florida)
- College: South Florida (2018–2023)
- NFL draft: 2024: undrafted

Career history
- Green Bay Packers (2024–present)

Career NFL statistics as of Week 10, 2026
- Games played: 5
- Games started: 1
- Stats at Pro Football Reference

Donovan Blu Jennings (born November 24, 1999) is an American professional football guard for the Green Bay Packers of the National Football League (NFL). He played college football for the South Florida Bulls.

== Professional career ==
Pre-draft measurables
Height	Weight	Arm length	Hand span	Wingspan	40-yard dash	10-yard split	20-yard split	20-yard shuttle	Three-cone drill	Vertical jump	Bench press
6 ft 4 1/8 in (1.93 m)	323 lb (147 kg)	33 in (0.84 m)	9 1/4 in (0.23 m)	6 ft 9 1/8 in (2.06 m)	5.02 s	1.77 s	2.91 s	4.70 s	7.60 s	28.0 in (0.71 m)	28 reps
All values from Pro Day

After not being selected in the 2024 NFL draft, Jennings signed with the Green Bay Packers as an undrafted free agent. Heading into the 2025 season, it was announced that Jennings had made the team's 53-man roster. He made two appearances for Green Bay during his rookie campaign. On January 3, 2026, Jennings was placed on season-ending injured reserve due to a throat injury suffered in practice.
