= Evan Williams (safety) =

American football player (born 2001)

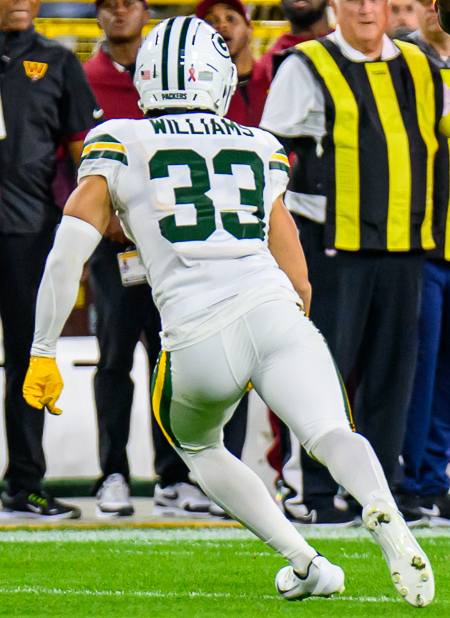

No. 33 – Green Bay Packers
- Position: Safety
- Roster status: Active

Personal information
- Born: July 28, 2001 (age 25); Los Gatos, California, U.S.
- Listed height: 5 ft 11 in (1.80 m)
- Listed weight: 200 lb (91 kg)

Career information
- High school: Saint Francis (Mountain View, California)
- College: Fresno State (2019–2022); Oregon (2023)
- NFL draft: 2024: 4th round, 111th overall pick

Career history
- Green Bay Packers (2024–present)

Awards and highlights
- PFWA All-Rookie Team (2024); First-team All-MW (2021); Second-team All-MW (2022); Second-team All-Pac-12 (2023)

Career NFL statistics as of Week 10, 2026
- Total tackles: 233
- Sacks: 1
- Forced fumbles: 1
- Fumble recoveries: 2
- Pass deflections: 16
- Interceptions: 7
- Stats at Pro Football Reference

Evan Williams (born July 28, 2001) is an American professional football safety for the Green Bay Packers of the National Football League (NFL). He previously played college football for the Fresno State Bulldogs and the Oregon Ducks.

== Early life ==
Williams attended high school at St. Francis in Mountain View, California. Williams committed to play college football for the Fresno State Bulldogs.

== College career ==
=== Fresno State ===
In Williams’s first collegiate season in 2019, he totaled 40 tackles, two pass deflections, an interception, a fumble recovery, and a forced fumble. Williams finished the 2020 season with 27 tackles and a forced fumble, where for his performance he was named an honorable mention member of the all Mountain West football team. In the 2021 season, Williams notched 92 tackles with four and a half being for a loss, and three interceptions. For his performance in the 2021 season, Williams was named first team all Mountain West. Williams finished the 2022 season with 69 tackles with six going for a loss, a sack, and four pass deflections. For his performance in the 2022 season, Williams was named second-team all-Mountain West. After the conclusion of the 2022 season, Williams decided to enter the NCAA transfer portal.

=== Oregon ===
Williams transferred to play for the Oregon Ducks. During his only season at Oregon, Williams finished the season with a team-high 82 tackles, with five tackles for loss, four and a half sacks, two pass deflections, two fumble recoveries and one forced fumble. For Williams’s performance on the 2023 season, he was honored by being named second team all Pac-12.

== Professional career ==
Pre-draft measurables
Height	Weight	Arm length	Hand span	Wingspan	40-yard dash	10-yard split	20-yard split	20-yard shuttle	Three-cone drill	Vertical jump	Broad jump	Bench press
5 ft 11 1/4 in (1.81 m)	200 lb (91 kg)	30 1/8 in (0.77 m)	10 1/8 in (0.26 m)	6 ft 0 7/8 in (1.85 m)	4.56 s	1.58 s	2.67 s	4.07 s	7.10 s	40.5 in (1.03 m)	10 ft 6 in (3.20 m)	18 reps
All values from NFL Combine/Pro Day

Williams was selected 111th overall by the Green Bay Packers in the 2024 NFL draft. He was the second of three safeties drafted by the Packers in the 2024 draft, as part of a remade safety room headlined by prized free-agent signing Xavier McKinney. On May 14, he signed his contract with the Packers. He was the starter at safety opposite McKinney by Week 4, ahead of fellow rookie Javon Bullard, a second-round pick, who was moved down to the slot/nickel corner position. He was named to the PFWA All-Rookie Team.

Williams was named NFC Defensive Player of the Month for October of the 2026 NFL season after posting 41 tackles (8.2 per game) with four passes defensed, a sack, a fumble recovery and two interceptions.

== NFL career statistics ==
Legend
**Bold**	Career high

=== Regular season ===
Year	Team	Games		Tackles						Interceptions						Fumbles	
Year	Team	GP	GS	Cmb	Solo	Ast	Sck	TFL	Sfty	PD	Int	Yds	Avg	Lng	TD	FF	FR
2024	GB	13	6	49	31	18	0.0	1	0	3	1	1	1.0	1	0	**1**	0
2025	GB	16	15	**100**	**48**	**52**	0.0	**4**	0	5	**3**	0	0.0	0	0	0	**1**
2026	GB	10	10	84	50	34	1.0	2	0	**8**	3	**17**	**5.7**	**17**	0	0	**1**
Career		39	31	233	129	104	1.0	7	0	16	7	18	2.6	17	0	1	2
Source: pro-football-reference.com

=== Postseason ===
Year	Team	Games		Tackles						Interceptions						Fumbles	
Year	Team	GP	GS	Cmb	Solo	Ast	Sck	TFL	Sfty	PD	Int	Yds	Avg	Lng	TD	FF	FR
2024	GB	1	1	4	2	**2**	0.0	0	0	**1**	0	0	0.0	0	0	0	0
2025	GB	1	1	**7**	**6**	1	0.0	0	0	0	0	0	0.0	0	0	0	0
Career		2	2	11	8	3	0.0	0	0	1	0	0	0.0	0	0	0	0
Source: pro-football-reference.com

== Personal life ==
Williams is the brother of former Oregon and CFL Defensive back Bennett Williams.
