= 2026 Green Bay Packers season =

106th season in franchise history

- Owner: Green Bay Packers, Inc.
- General manager: Brian Gutekunst
- President: Ed Policy
- Head coach: Matt LaFleur
- Home stadium: Lambeau Field

Results
- Record: 6–4
- Division place: 4th NFC North

Uniform
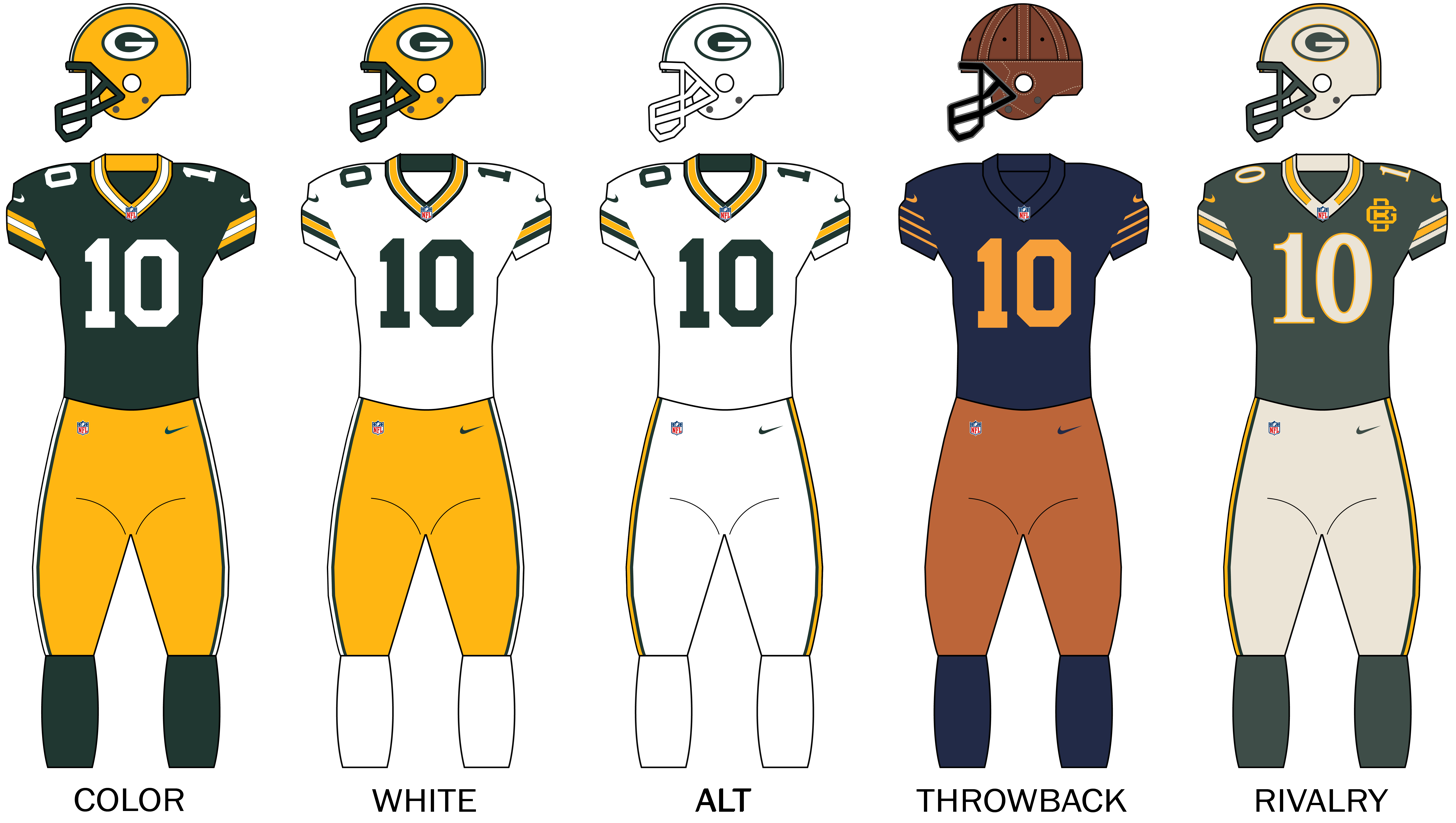

The 2026 season is the Green Bay Packers' 106th in the National Football League (NFL), their ninth under general manager Brian Gutekunst and their eighth under head coach Matt LaFleur. They will attempt to improve on their 9–7–1 record from the year before, make the playoffs for the fourth consecutive season, and end their four-year NFC North title drought. Green Bay lost their home opener game for the first time since 2012, with a 35–14 upset loss to the Atlanta Falcons.

== Offseason ==
=== Coaching changes ===
2026 Green Bay Packers coaching staff changes
Position	Previous coach(es)	Vacancy reason	Replacement(s)	Source(s)
Quarterbacks coach	Sean Mannion, 2025	Hired by Philadelphia	Luke Getsy	
Defensive coordinator	Jeff Hafley, 2024–2025	Hired by Miami	Jonathan Gannon	
Linebackers coach	Sean Duggan, 2025	Hired by Miami	Sam Siefkes	
Defensive backs coach	Ryan Downard, 2023–2025	Hired by Miami	Noah Pauley	
Defensive passing game coordinator	Derrick Ansley, 2024–2025	Mutual consent	Bobby Babich	
Special teams coordinator	Rich Bisaccia, 2022–2025	Resigned	Cam Achord	

=== Trades ===
Date	Player incoming	Player outgoing
March 11	To Green Bay Packers; 2027 fourth-round pick	To Dallas Cowboys; Rashan Gary
March 11	To Green Bay Packers; Zaire Franklin	To Indianapolis Colts; Colby Wooden
April 11	To Green Bay Packers; 2026 fifth-round pick 2027 sixth-round pick	To Philadelphia Eagles; Dontayvion Wicks
August 30	To Green Bay Packers; 2028 sixth-round pick	To Miami Dolphins; Kyle McCord
August 30	To Green Bay Packers; Kaleb Johnson	To Pittsburgh Steelers; 2028 sixth-round pick
August 30	To Green Bay Packers; Mark Redman	To Los Angeles Rams; 2028 seventh-round pick

=== Additions ===
Position	Player	Former team	Date
CB	Benjamin St-Juste	Los Angeles Chargers	March 12
WR	Skyy Moore	San Francisco 49ers	March 13
DL	Javon Hargrave	Minnesota Vikings	March 13
QB	Tyrod Taylor	New York Jets	May 4
CB	MJ Devonshire	Buffalo Bills	May 13
CB	Marlon Jones	Vanderbilt	May 19
TE	Luke Lachey	Houston Texans	June 15
K	Lenny Krieg	New York Jets	July 28
TE	Thomas Yassmin	Los Angeles Chargers	July 28
LS	Cal Adomitis	Pittsburgh Steelers	July 31
WR	Kaden Prather	Louisville Kings	July 31
TE	McCallan Castles	Green Bay Packers	August 4
TE	Drew Biber	Minnesota Golden Gophers	August 4
WR	Kisean Johnson	Green Bay Packers	August 9
WR	Chris Hilton Jr.	Washington Commanders	August 10
S	Trey Dean	St. Louis Battlehawks	August 11
S	Tra Fluellen	Dallas Renegades	August 11
EDGE	Arden Walker	Minnesota Vikings	August 19
TE	Jonnu Smith	Pittsburgh Steelers	August 29
WR	Bo Melton	Green Bay Packers	September 14
G	Laken Tomlinson	Dallas Cowboys	September 28
G	Kevin Zeitler	Tennessee Titans	September 30
LB	Kristian Welch	Green Bay Packers	October 6
RB	Pierre Strong Jr.	Green Bay Packers	October 8
WR	Coleman Owen	Green Bay Packers	October 24
G	Mekhi Becton	Green Bay Packers	October 26

=== Free agents ===
Position	Player	Free agency tag	Date signed	2026 team
FS	Zayne Anderson	RFA	March 13	Miami Dolphins
RB	Chris Brooks	RFA	March 4	Green Bay Packers
OLB	Brenton Cox Jr.	RFA	March 11	Green Bay Packers
WR	Romeo Doubs	UFA	March 12	New England Patriots
OLB	Kingsley Enagbare	UFA	March 12	New York Jets
TE	John FitzPatrick	UFA		
NT	Jonathan Ford	RFA	March 11	Green Bay Packers
CB	Kamal Hadden	ERFA	March 30	Green Bay Packers
LG	Donovan Jennings	ERFA	April 20	Green Bay Packers
RT	Darian Kinnard	RFA	March 9	Green Bay Packers
WR/CB	Bo Melton	ERFA	April 20	Green Bay Packers
OLB	Arron Mosby	RFA	March 23	Green Bay Packers
ILB	Nick Niemann	UFA	March 7	Green Bay Packers
LG	Lecitus Smith	ERFA	August 13	Denver Broncos
LT	Rasheed Walker	UFA	March 14	Carolina Panthers
ILB	Quay Walker	UFA	March 12	Las Vegas Raiders
ILB	Kristian Welch	UFA	March 9	Green Bay Packers
QB	Malik Willis	UFA	March 12	Miami Dolphins
RB	Emanuel Wilson	RFA	March 13	Seattle Seahawks
TE	Josh Whyle	RFA	March 11	Green Bay Packers

=== Re-signings ===
Position	Player	Date
C	Sean Rhyan	March 11
WR	Jayden Reed	April 25
WR	Christian Watson	June 4
LB	Isaiah McDuffie	July 14
DT	Devonte Wyatt	July 27
TE	Tucker Kraft	September 12

=== Subtractions ===
Position	Player	Date	2026 team
C	Elgton Jenkins	March 9	Cleveland Browns
CB	Nate Hobbs	March 11	San Francisco 49ers
TE	McCallan Castles	April 17	Green Bay Packers
CB	Tyron Herring	April 17	
LB	Jamon Dumas-Johnson	April 17	Baltimore Ravens
K	Brandon McManus	May 8	Los Angeles Rams
DT	James Ester	May 13	
WR	Jakobie Keeney-James	June 15	Pittsburgh Steelers
LB	Dante Barnett	July 28	
K	Lucas Havrisik	July 28	
K	Lenny Krieg	July 31	Green Bay Packers
WR	Brenden Rice	July 31	Colorado Stampede
TE	Luke Lachey	August 4	
TE	R. J. Maryland	August 4	
S	Johnathan Baldwin	August 9	
CB	Marlon Jones	August 9	
TE	Drew Biber	August 11	
G	Karsen Barnhart	August 11	
QB	Kyron Drones	August 15	Dallas Renegades
S	Tra Fluellen	August 29	Colorado Stampede
WR	Bo Melton	September 11	Green Bay Packers
RB	Pierre Strong Jr.	November 19	

=== Draft ===
2026 Green Bay Packers draft selections
Round	Selection	Player	Position	College	Notes
1	20	Traded to the Dallas Cowboys (Note: The Packers traded their 2026 first-round selection (20th overall) as part of the trade to the Dallas Cowboys in exchange for DE Micah Parsons)			
2	52	Brandon Cisse	CB	South Carolina	
3	77	Chris McClellan	DT	Missouri	from Buccaneers (Note: The Packers traded their third (84th overall) and fifth-round selection (160th overall) for this pick.)
4	120	Dani Dennis-Sutton	DE	Penn State	
5	153	Jager Burton	C	Kentucky	from Eagles (Note: The Packers acquired this fifth-round selection (153rd overall) for Dontayvion Wicks.)
5	160	Traded to the Tampa Bay Buccaneers			
6	201	Domani Jackson	CB	Alabama	
6	216	Trey Smack	K	Florida	from Seahawks (Note: The Packers acquired this sixth-round selection (216th overall) for two seventh-round picks (236th and 255th overall).)
7	236	Traded to the Seattle Seahawks			
7	255	Traded to the Seattle Seahawks			Compensatory pick

Draft trades

=== Undrafted free agents ===
2026 Green Bay Packers undrafted free agents
Name	Position	College	Ref.
Dylan Barrett	G	Iowa State	
Kyron Drones	QB	Virginia Tech	
Josh Gesky	G	Illinois	
Nyjalik Kelly	LB	UCF	
Murvin Kenion	S	Nevada	
R. J. Maryland	TE	SMU	
Jaden Nixon	RB	UCF	
TJ Quinn	LB	Louisville	
J. Michael Sturdivant	WR	Florida	
Dillon Wade	G	Auburn	

=== Roster cuts ===
The roster was cut to 53 on August 30, 2026.

Position	Player	2026 team
LS	Cal Adomitis	
T	Brant Banks	
G	Dylan Barrett	
CB	Shemar Bartholomew	
T	Dalton Cooper	
DT	Jaden Crumedy	
TE	Drake Dabney	
CB	MJ Devonshire Jr.	
G	Josh Gesky	
WR	Chris Hilton Jr.	
CB	Domani Jackson	
WR	Kisean Johnson	
EDGE	Nyjalik Kelly	
S	Murvin Kenion III	
T/G	Darian Kinnard	
RB	Damien Martinez	
EDGE	Arron Mosby	
WR	Isaiah Neyor	
RB	Jaden Nixon	
S	Mark Perry	
WR	Kaden Prather	
LB	TJ Quinn	
WR	Will Sheppard	
CB	Jaylin Simpson	
DT	Nazir Stackhouse	
RB	Pierre Strong Jr.	
TE	Messiah Swinson	
G	Dillon Wade	
EDGE	Arden Walker	
LB	Kristian Welch	

== Staff ==
Green Bay Packers staff
Front office: Owner: Publicly held corporation; Executive committee – Board of directors; President/CEO – Ed Policy; General manager – Brian Gutekunst; Executive vice president/Director of football operations – Russ Ball; Vice president of player personnel – Milt Hendrickson; Director of football operations – John Wojciechowski; Director of player personnel – Richmond Williams; Senior player personnel executive – Matt Malaspina; Director of college scouting – Patrick Moore; Senior player personnel executive/Director of pro scouting – Lee Gissendaner; Assistant director of pro scouting – Mike Owen; Senior national scout – Sam Seale; National scout – Luke Benuska; Director of player engagement – Grey Ruegamer; Director of performance psychology/team behavioral health clinician – Chris Carr; Director of football administration/player finance – Melanie Marohl; Head coaches: Head coach – Matt LaFleur; Quarterbacks/assistant head coach – offense – Luke Getsy; Outside linebackers/run game coordinator/assistant head coach – defense – DeMarcus Covington; Offensive coaches: Offensive coordinator – Adam Stenavich; Passing game coordinator – Jason Vrable; Running backs – Ben Sirmans; Wide receivers – Noah Pauley; Assistant wide receivers – Rob Grosso; Tight ends – John Dunn; Offensive line – Luke Butkus; Assistant offensive line – Eddie Gordon; Pass game specialist/game management – Connor Lewis; Offensive assistant – Jeremiah Kolone; Offensive quality control – T. C. McCartney	Defensive coaches: Defensive coordinator – Jonathan Gannon; Defensive line – Vince Oghobaase; Linebackers – Sam Siefkes; Secondary/pass game coordinator – Bobby Babich; Cornerbacks – Daniel Bullocks; Defensive analyst – Scott Fuchs; Defensive quality control – Jamael Lett; Defensive quality control – Will Smart; Special teams coaches: Special teams coordinator – Cameron Achord; Assistant special teams – Cory Harkey; Assistant special teams – Jeff Koonz; Strength and conditioning: Strength and conditioning coordinator – Aaron Hill; Strength and conditioning assistant – Jake Flint; Strength and conditioning assistant – Marcus Jones; Strength and conditioning assistant – Ben Schumacher; → Coaching staff → Front office → More NFL staffs

== Current roster ==
Green Bay Packers roster
Quarterbacks (QB): 10 Jordan Love; 6 Tyrod Taylor; Running backs (RB): 30 Chris Brooks; 8 Josh Jacobs; 26 Kaleb Johnson; 32 MarShawn Lloyd; Wide receivers (WR): 0 Matthew Golden; 16 Bo Melton; 23 Skyy Moore; 87 J. Michael Sturdivant; 9 Christian Watson; 83 Savion Williams; Tight ends (TE): 85 Tucker Kraft; 86 Mark Redman; 18 Jonnu Smith	Offensive linemen (OL): 65 Aaron Banks G; 74 Mekhi Becton T; 71 Anthony Belton T; 52 Jager Burton G; 79 Travis Glover G; 67 Donovan Jennings G; 77 Jordan Morgan T; 75 Sean Rhyan C; 72 Laken Tomlinson G; 73 John Williams C; 70 Kevin Zeitler G; Defensive linemen (DL): 94 Karl Brooks DT; 93 Anthony Campbell DT; 57 Brenton Cox Jr. ED; 51 Dani Dennis-Sutton ED; 55 Chris McClellan DT; 97 Jordon Riley DT; 99 Barryn Sorrell ED; 90 Lukas Van Ness ED; 95 Devonte Wyatt DT	Linebackers (LB): 44 Zaire Franklin; 59 Ty'Ron Hopper; 58 Isaiah McDuffie; 31 Nick Niemann; 54 Kristian Welch; Defensive backs (DB): 7 Javon Bullard S; 2 Brandon Cisse CB; 36 Kamal Hadden CB; 29 Xavier McKinney S; 25 Keisean Nixon CB; 27 Kitan Oladapo S; 21 Benjamin St-Juste CB; 24 Carrington Valentine CB; 33 Evan Williams S; Special teams (ST): 42 Matthew Orzech LS; 28 Trey Smack K; 19 Daniel Whelan P	Practice squad: 78 Dalton Cooper T; 39 Elijah Culp CB; 49 Drake Dabney TE; 48 Jack Dingle LB; 43 Kenny Fletcher Jr. TE; 20 Domani Jackson CB; 46 D. J. Johnson ED; 47 Nyjalik Kelly ED; 17 Cam Miller QB; 53 Arron Mosby ED; 64 Haggai Ndubuisi DT (IPP); 80 Isaiah Neyor WR; 13 Coleman Owen WR; 35 John Saunders Jr. S; 82 Quincy Skinner Jr. WR; 63 Mazi Smith DT; 68 Dillon Wade G; Reserve: 50 Zach Bako-Bewele T (IR); 91 Warren Brinson DT (IR); 56 Edgerrin Cooper LB (IR); 96 Jonathan Ford DT (IR); 98 Javon Hargrave DT (IR); 62 Jacob Monk G (IR); 88 Luke Musgrave TE (PUP); 45 Collin Oliver ED (IR/DFR); 1 Micah Parsons ED (PUP); 11 Jayden Reed WR (IR); 81 Josh Whyle TE (IR) 52 active, 16 practice squad (1 IPP), 11 reserve As of November 19, 2026. Rookies in italics.; Roster; Depth chart; Transactions

== Preseason ==
The schedule was announced on May 14, 2026.

Week	Date	Opponent	Result	Record	Venue	Recap
1	August 13	at Pittsburgh Steelers	L 9–28	0–1	Acrisure Stadium	Recap
2	August 21	at Denver Broncos	W 33–13	1–1	Empower Field at Mile High	Recap
3	August 28	Arizona Cardinals	W 42–38	2–1	Lambeau Field	Recap

== Regular season ==
=== Schedule ===
On May 13, the NFL announced that the Packers would go to SoFi Stadium to play the Los Angeles Rams during the inaugural Thanksgiving Eve game. The remainder of the schedule was announced on May 14.

Week	Date	Time (CT)	Opponent	Result	Record	Venue	Network	Recap
1	September 13	3:25 p.m.	at **Minnesota Vikings**	**L** 22–39	0–1	U.S. Bank Stadium	CBS	Recap
2	September 20	12:00 p.m.	at New York Jets	**W** 20–17 (OT)	1–1	MetLife Stadium	Fox	Recap
3	September 24	7:15 p.m.	Atlanta Falcons	**L** 14–35	1–2	Lambeau Field	Prime Video	Recap
4	October 4	12:00 p.m.	at Tampa Bay Buccaneers	**W** 17–14	2–2	Raymond James Stadium	Fox	Recap
5	October 11	12:00 p.m.	**Chicago Bears**	**W** 31–7	3–2	Lambeau Field	Fox	Recap
6	October 18	7:20 p.m.	Dallas Cowboys	**W** 23–13	4–2	Lambeau Field	NBC	Recap
7	October 25	3:25 p.m.	at **Detroit Lions**	**L** 17–20	4–3	Ford Field	Fox	Recap
8	October 29	7:15 p.m.	Carolina Panthers	**W** 27–19	5–3	Lambeau Field	Prime Video	Recap
9	November 8	3:25 p.m.	at New England Patriots	**W** 45–27	6–3	Gillette Stadium	Fox	Recap
10	November 15	12:00 p.m.	**Minnesota Vikings**	**L** 10–30	6–4	Lambeau Field	Fox	Recap
11	Bye							
12	November 25	7:00 p.m.	at Los Angeles Rams			SoFi Stadium	Netflix	
13	December 6	12:00 p.m.	at New Orleans Saints			Caesars Superdome	Fox	
14	December 13	7:20 p.m.	Buffalo Bills			Lambeau Field	NBC	
15	December 20	12:00 p.m.	Miami Dolphins			Lambeau Field	Fox	
16	December 25	12:00 p.m.	at **Chicago Bears**			Soldier Field	Netflix	
17	January 4	7:15 p.m.	Houston Texans			Lambeau Field	ESPN	
18	January 9/10	TBD	**Detroit Lions**			Lambeau Field	TBD	

Notes

- Intra-division opponents are in **bold** text.
- Networks, dates and times from Weeks 13–15 and Week 17 are subject to change as a result of flexible scheduling; Week 16 is exempt, as it occurs on Christmas.
- The date, time and network for Week 18 will be finalized at the end of Week 17.

=== Game summaries ===
==== Week 1: at Minnesota Vikings ====
Week 1: Green Bay Packers at Minnesota Vikings – Game summary

Quarter	1	2	3	4	Total
Packers	9	10	3	0	**22**
**Vikings**	3	7	7	22	**39**

at U.S. Bank Stadium, Minneapolis, Minnesota

- Date: September 13
- Game time: 3:25 p.m. CDT
- Game weather: None (indoor stadium)
- Game attendance: 66,940
- Referee: Shawn Hochuli
- TV announcers (CBS): Jim Nantz, J. J. Watt and Tracy Wolfson
- Recap, Game Book

Game information

**First quarter**

- GB – Trey Smack 59-yard field goal, 12:11. Packers 3–0. **Drive: 6 plays, 12 yards, 2:03.**
- GB – Christian Watson 81-yard pass from Jordan Love (kick failed), 7:43. Packers 9–0. **Drive: 2 plays, 81 yards, 0:13.**
- MIN – Will Reichard 38-yard field goal, 1:38. Packers 9–3. **Drive: 12 plays, 50 yards, 6:05.**

**Second quarter**

- GB – Trey Smack 43-yard field goal, 13:52. Packers 12–3. **Drive: 7 plays, 15 yards, 2:46.**
- MIN – Justin Jefferson 39-yard pass from Carson Wentz (Will Reichard kick), 1:55. Packers 12–10. **Drive: 7 plays, 85 yards, 3:23.**
- GB – Christian Watson 2-yard pass from Jordan Love (Trey Smack kick), 0:14. Packers 19–10. **Drive: 7 plays, 74 yards, 1:41.**

**Third quarter**

- GB – Trey Smack 26-yard field goal, 5:09. Packers 22–10. **Drive: 12 plays, 79 yards, 5:46.**
- MIN – T. J. Hockenson 16-yard pass from Carson Wentz (Will Reichard kick), 2:08. Packers 22–17. **Drive: 6 plays, 28 yards, 3:01.**

**Fourth quarter**

- MIN – Aaron Jones 3-yard run (Carson Wentz–Justin Jefferson pass), 6:37. Vikings 25–22. **Drive: 9 plays, 83 yards, 6:34.**
- MIN – Jordan Mason 1-yard run (Will Reichard kick), 4:48. Vikings 32–22. **Drive: 1 play, 1 yard, 0:04.**
- MIN – Justin Jefferson 9-yard pass from Carson Wentz (Will Reichard kick), 3:55. Vikings 39–22. **Drive: 3 plays, 14 yards, 0:18.**

**Top passers**

- GB – Jordan Love – 21/42, 387 yards, 2 TD, INT
- MIN – Carson Wentz – 12/19, 133 yards, 3 TD

**Top rushers**

- GB – MarShawn Lloyd – 13 rushes, 37 yards
- MIN – Jordan Mason – 15 rushes, 59 yards, TD

**Top receivers**

- GB – Christian Watson – 6 receptions, 147 yards, 2 TD
- MIN – Justin Jefferson – 8 receptions, 92 yards, 2 TD

The Packers attempted to win their first road game against the Vikings since the Week 17 2023 by avenging their meaningless loss in Week 18 of 2025.

Ahead 22–10, it appeared as if the Packers were poised to snap their five-game losing streak dating back to last season. However, the Vikings rallied to score 29 unanswered points, including 22 in the fourth quarter. With team ahead by five, kicker Trey Smack converted a 40-yard field goal that would've extended the lead to eight. However, Minnesota committed an offsides penalty that made it fourth and one, Jordan Love was stopped short on a quarterback sneak and the momentum switched from there.

==== Week 2: at New York Jets ====
Week 2: Green Bay Packers at New York Jets – Game summary

Quarter	1	2	3	4	OT	Total
**Packers**	0	7	0	10	3	**20**
Jets	0	7	7	3	0	**17**

at MetLife Stadium, East Rutherford, New Jersey

- Date: September 20
- Game time: 1:00 p.m. EDT/12:00 p.m. CDT
- Game weather: Drizzle, 69 °F (21 °C)
- Game attendance: 78,674
- Referee: Scott Novak
- TV announcers (Fox): Kenny Albert, Jonathan Vilma and Megan Olivi
- Recap, Game Book

Game information

**First quarter**

- No scoring plays

**Second quarter**

- GB – MarShawn Lloyd 6-yard pass from Jordan Love (Trey Smack kick), 9:35. Packers 7–0. **Drive: 9 plays, 64 yards, 5:27.**
- NYJ – Braelon Allen 5-yard run (Jason Sanders kick), 6:04. Tied 7–7. **Drive: 7 plays, 70 yards, 3:31.**

**Third quarter**

- NYJ – Garrett Wilson 5-yard pass from Geno Smith (Jason Sanders kick), 2:30. Jets 14–7. **Drive: 10 plays, 70 yards, 5:00.**

**Fourth quarter**

- NYJ – Jason Sanders 32-yard field goal, 11:04. Jets 17–7. **Drive: 4 plays, 4 yards, 1:23.**
- GB – Christian Watson 3-yard pass from Jordan Love (Trey Smack kick), 7:58. Jets 17–14. **Drive: 7 plays, 73 yards, 3:06.**
- GB – Trey Smack 34-yard field goal, 2:59. Tied 17–17. **Drive: 4 plays, 3 yards, 1:33.**

**Overtime**

- GB – Trey Smack 26-yard field goal, 5:23. Packers 20–17. **Drive: 5 plays, 58 yards, 2:06.**

**Top passers**

- GB – Jordan Love – 16/29, 145 yards, 2 TD
- NYJ – Geno Smith – 27/41, 247 yards, TD

**Top rushers**

- GB – Kaleb Johnson – 8 rushes, 32 yards
- NYJ – Breece Hall – 16 rushes, 29 yards

**Top receivers**

- GB – Matthew Golden – 4 receptions, 58 yards
- NYJ – Breece Hall – 5 receptions, 63 yards

Despite trailing by 10, the Packers were able score 17 unanswered points including the game-winning field goal by Trey Smack. As a result, they secured their first win since Week 14 of 2025, snapping a six-game losing streak. This also marked their third road win against the Jets since 2010 and their first without defensive lineman Micah Parsons since Week 16 of 2024. The Packers also became the first team in NFL history since 1941 to win a game with less than 200 total yards, 100 or more penalty yards and a negative turnover margin, with such teams being 0–44 prior. However, the team also lost wide receiver Jayden Reed and offensive tackle Zach Bako-Bewele to injuries during the game.

==== Week 3: vs. Atlanta Falcons ====
Week 3: Atlanta Falcons at Green Bay Packers – Game summary

Quarter	1	2	3	4	Total
**Falcons**	7	10	7	11	**35**
Packers	7	0	0	7	**14**

at Lambeau Field, Green Bay, Wisconsin

- Date: September 24
- Game time: 7:15 p.m. CDT
- Game weather: Cloudy, 61 °F (16 °C)
- Game attendance: 76,955
- Referee: Shawn Smith
- TV announcers (WGBA (Green Bay)/WITI (Milwaukee)/Prime Video): Al Michaels, Kirk Herbstreit and Kaylee Hartung
- Recap, Game Book

Game information

**First quarter**

- GB – Christian Watson 4-yard pass from Jordan Love (Trey Smack kick), 5:13. Packers 7–0. **Drive: 9 plays, 87 yards, 4:53.**
- ATL – Bijan Robinson 3-yard run (Nick Folk kick), 1:32. Tied 7–7. **Drive: 7 plays, 85 yards, 3:41.**

**Second quarter**

- ATL – Nick Folk 44-yard field goal, 4:48. Falcons 10–7. **Drive: 8 plays, 38 yards, 4:47.**
- ATL – Austin Hooper 5-yard pass from Michael Penix Jr. (Nick Folk kick), 0:59. Falcons 17–7. **Drive: 8 plays, 63 yards, 2:43.**

**Third quarter**

- ATL – Brian Robinson Jr. 7-yard run (Nick Folk kick), 3:38. Falcons 24–7. **Drive: 10 plays, 92 yards, 6:18.**

**Fourth quarter**

- ATL – Nick Folk 31-yard field goal, 10:57. Falcons 27–7. **Drive: 7 plays, 79 yards, 4:58.**
- GB – Matthew Golden 15-yard pass from Jordan Love (Trey Smack kick), 8:18. Falcons 27–14. **Drive: 10 plays, 76 yards, 2:39.**
- ATL – Bijan Robinson 2-yard run (Michael Penix Jr.–Chris Blair pass), 3:33. Falcons 35–14. **Drive: 8 plays, 67 yards, 4:45.**

**Top passers**

- ATL – Michael Penix Jr. – 18/25, 256 yards, TD, INT
- GB – Jordan Love – 28/53, 312 yards, 2 TD, INT

**Top rushers**

- ATL – Bijan Robinson – 29 rushes, 194 yards, 2 TD
- GB – MarShawn Lloyd – 4 rushes, 11 yards

**Top receivers**

- ATL – Drake London – 9 receptions, 194 yards
- GB – Matthew Golden – 5 receptions, 100 yards, TD

The Packers entered this game with a 7–0 record in home openers under head coach Matt LaFleur. This also marked the first time in series history that they would face off against the Falcons on Thursday Night Football.

==== Week 4: at Tampa Bay Buccaneers ====
Week 4: Green Bay Packers at Tampa Bay Buccaneers – Game summary

Quarter	1	2	3	4	Total
**Packers**	0	10	7	0	**17**
Buccaneers	0	7	0	7	**14**

at Raymond James Stadium, Tampa, Florida

- Date: October 4
- Game time: 1:00 p.m. EDT/12:00 p.m. CDT
- Game weather: Cloudy, 86 °F (30 °C)
- Game attendance: 61,467
- Referee: Alex Kemp
- TV announcers (Fox): Chris Myers, Jonathan Vilma and Jen Hale
- Recap, Game Book

Game information

**First quarter**

- No scoring plays

**Second quarter**

- GB – Matthew Golden 2-yard pass from Jordan Love (Trey Smack kick), 12:54. Packers 7–0. **Drive: 16 plays, 68 yards, 9:16.**
- TB – Sean Tucker 2-yard run (Chase McLaughlin kick), 5:13. Tied 7–7. **Drive: 9 plays, 54 yards, 5:14.**
- GB – Trey Smack 58-yard field goal, 0:00. Packers 10–7. **Drive: 3 plays, 4 yards, 0:34.**

**Third quarter**

- GB – Tucker Kraft 2-yard pass from Jordan Love (Trey Smack kick), 10:32. Packers 17–7. **Drive: 8 plays, 80 yards, 4:28**

**Fourth quarter**

- TB – Kenneth Gainwell 10-yard pass from Jalon Daniels (Chase McLaughlin kick), 14:49. Packers 17–14. **Drive: 12 plays, 84 yards, 6:28.**

**Top passers**

- GB – Jordan Love – 22/30, 197 yards, 2 TD, INT
- TB – Jalon Daniels – 19/27, 148 yards, TD, 2 INT

**Top rushers**

- GB – Kaleb Johnson – 8 rushes, 42 yards
- TB – Bucky Irving – 16 rushes, 61 yards

**Top receivers**

- GB – Christian Watson – 3 receptions, 47 yards
- TB – Cade Otton – 4 receptions, 37 yards

Heading into this matchup, the Buccaneers started undrafted rookie quarterback Jalon Daniels in place of an injured Baker Mayfield, who fractured his thumb in Week 3 against the Vikings

Despite nearly blowing a 17–7 lead due to two turnovers in the fourth quarter, the Packers were able to hold off their former division rival after their defense made a pair of clutch stops.

==== Week 5: vs. Chicago Bears ====
Week 5: Chicago Bears at Green Bay Packers – Game summary

Quarter	1	2	3	4	Total
Bears	0	7	0	0	**7**
**Packers**	7	7	9	8	**31**

at Lambeau Field, Green Bay, Wisconsin

- Date: October 11
- Game time: 12:00 p.m. CDT
- Game weather: Sunny, 73 °F (23 °C)
- Game attendance: 77,755
- Referee: Clay Martin
- TV announcers (Fox): Kenny Albert, Greg Olsen and Pam Oliver
- Recap, Game Book

Game information

**First quarter**

- GB – Christian Watson 42-yard pass from Jordan Love (Trey Smack kick), 5:51. Packers 7–0. **Drive: 10 plays, 91 yards, 6:13.**

**Second quarter**

- GB – MarShawn Lloyd 7-yard run (Trey Smack kick), 14:56. Packers 14–0. **Drive: 10 plays, 45 yards, 5:36.**
- CHI – D'Andre Swift 1-yard run (Cairo Santos kick), 1:51. Packers 14–7. **Drive: 16 plays, 78 yards, 9:10.**

**Third quarter**

- GB – Christian Watson 53-yard pass from Jordan Love (kick failed), 13:10. Packers 20–7. **Drive: 4 plays, 72 yards, 1:50.**
- GB – Trey Smack 35-yard field goal, 1:58. Packers 23–7. **Drive: 5 plays, 45 yards, 2:10.**

**Fourth quarter**

- GB – MarShawn Lloyd 4-yard run (Jordan Love–Matthew Golden pass), 14:55. Packers 31–7. **Drive: 3 plays, 55 yards, 0:39.**

**Top passers**

- CHI – Case Keenum – 11/19, 108 yards, INT
- GB – Jordan Love – 25/31, 367 yards, 2 TD

**Top rushers**

- CHI – D'Andre Swift – 9 rushes, 43 yards, TD
- GB – MarShawn Lloyd – 10 rushes, 31 yards, TD

**Top receivers**

- CHI – Luther Burden III – 4 receptions, 47 yards
- GB – Christian Watson – 6 receptions, 143 yards, 2 TD

In a rematch of last season's NFC Wild Card round, the Packers Jordan Love threw for 367 yards and the defense held the Bears Caleb Williams-less offense to only 7 points. The Green Bay defense intercepted backup quarterbacks Tyson Bagent and Case Keenum three times and forced two strip-sack fumble recoveries en route to a 31–7 blowout over their longtime rivals. This marked the Packers' their first home win of the season; they also moved into second place in the NFC North with this division win as the tiebreaker. The Packers also wore their new Rivalries Uniform for the first time in this contest. This also marked the Packers 110th victory over the Bears that extended the most wins by any NFL team over a single opponent.

==== Week 6: vs. Dallas Cowboys ====
Week 6: Dallas Cowboys at Green Bay Packers – Game summary

Quarter	1	2	3	4	Total
Cowboys	0	0	7	6	**13**
**Packers**	7	10	3	3	**23**

at Lambeau Field, Green Bay, Wisconsin

- Date: October 18
- Game time: 7:20 p.m. CDT
- Game weather: Clear, 59 °F (15 °C)
- Game attendance: 77,383
- Referee: Craig Wrolstad
- TV announcers (NBC): Mike Tirico, Cris Collinsworth and Melissa Stark
- Recap, Game Book

Game information

**First quarter**

- GB – Matthew Golden 9-yard pass from Jordan Love (Trey Smack kick), 4:43. Packers 7–0. **Drive: 14 plays, 90 yards, 6:30.**

**Second quarter**

- GB – Trey Smack 25-yard field goal, 5:58. Packers 10–0. **Drive: 15 plays, 73 yards, 8:17.**
- GB – Jordan Love 1-yard run (Trey Smack kick), 0:23. Packers 17–0. **Drive: 9 plays, 77 yards, 1:27.**

**Third quarter**

- DAL – Javonte Williams 1-yard run (Brandon Aubrey kick), 9:19. Packers 17–7. **Drive: 9 plays, 46 yards, 4:32.**
- GB – Trey Smack 44-yard field goal, 5:02. Packers 20–7. **Drive: 11 plays, 42 yards, 4:17.**

**Fourth quarter**

- GB – Trey Smack 29-yard field goal, 10:06. Packers 23–7. **Drive: 9 plays, 38 yards, 3:24.**
- DAL – Ryan Flournoy 6-yard pass from Dak Prescott (pass failed), 0:44. Packers 23–13. **Drive: 13 plays, 78 yards, 2:17.**

**Top passers**

- DAL – Dak Prescott – 34/54, 258 yards, TD, 2 INT
- GB – Jordan Love – 23/41, 276 yards, TD, INT

**Top rushers**

- DAL – Javonte Williams – 11 rushes, 41 yards, TD
- GB – Pierre Strong Jr. – 11 rushes, 28 yards

**Top receivers**

- DAL – George Pickens – 6 receptions, 73 yards
- GB – Matthew Golden – 6 receptions, 104 yards, TD

The Packers won their third straight game by securing a 17–0 halftime lead and winning 23–13, leaving them without a loss against the Cowboys since 2016.

==== Week 7: at Detroit Lions ====
Week 7: Green Bay Packers at Detroit Lions – Game summary

Quarter	1	2	3	4	Total
Packers	7	0	7	3	**17**
**Lions**	7	3	7	3	**20**

at Ford Field, Detroit, Michigan

- Date: October 25
- Game time: 4:25 p.m. EDT/3:25 p.m. CDT
- Game weather: None (indoor stadium)
- Game attendance: 64,008
- Referee: Alex Moore
- TV announcers (Fox): Kevin Burkhardt, Tom Brady, Erin Andrews and Tom Rinaldi
- Recap, Game Book

Game information

**First quarter**

- DET – Jameson Williams 16-yard pass from Jared Goff (Jake Bates kick), 7:00. Lions 7–0. **Drive: 6 plays, 80 yards, 3:23.**
- GB – Tucker Kraft 14-yard pass from Jordan Love (Trey Smack kick), 0:58. Tied 7–7. **Drive: 12 plays, 74 yards, 6:02.**

**Second quarter**

- DET – Jake Bates 40-yard field goal, 12:36. Lions 10–7. **Drive: 6 plays, 55 yards, 3:22.**

**Third quarter**

- GB – Josh Jacobs 25-yard pass from Jordan Love (Trey Smack kick), 12:14. Packers 14–10. **Drive: 5 plays, 42 yards, 1:58.**
- DET – Jameson Williams 10-yard pass from Jared Goff (Jake Bates kick), 6:33. Lions 17–14. **Drive: 10 plays, 80 yards, 5:41.**

**Fourth quarter**

- GB – Trey Smack 43-yard field goal, 7:10. Tied 17–17. **Drive: 12 plays, 61 yards, 6:34.**
- DET – Jake Bates 22-yard field goal, 0:00. Lions 20–17. **Drive: 10 plays, 71 yards, 3:21.**

**Top passers**

- GB – Jordan Love – 27/45, 274 yards, 2 TD, INT
- DET – Jared Goff – 22/32, 303 yards, 2 TD

**Top rushers**

- GB – Josh Jacobs – 11 rushes, 36 yards
- DET – Jahmyr Gibbs – 29 rushes, 116 yards

**Top receivers**

- GB – Christian Watson – 5 receptions, 57 yards
- DET – Amon-Ra St. Brown – 9 receptions, 153 yards

The Lions defeated the Packers 20–17. The Packers inability to convert in the red area is whay ultimately cost them the game. They were 1 of 4 in the red zone, with kicker Trey Smack missing a 26 yard field goal in the first quarter, Jordan Love throwing a red zone interception in the second quarter and a 35 yard field goal attempt by Smack was partially blocked in the 4th quarter.

Also, the officiating in the game was met with controversy due to two questionalable roughing the passer calls on the Packers that helped the Lions extend a drive and kick the game–winning field goal. The penalties were also criticized by announcers Kevin Burkhardt and Tom Brady.

Josh Jacobs returned to the Packers lineup in this game, coming off of the commissioner's exempt list after missing six weeks. His personal conduct investigation was still remaining open.

==== Week 8: vs. Carolina Panthers ====
Week 8: Carolina Panthers at Green Bay Packers – Game summary

Quarter	1	2	3	4	Total
Panthers	3	7	3	6	**19**
**Packers**	6	14	7	0	**27**

at Lambeau Field, Green Bay, Wisconsin

- Date: October 29
- Game time: 7:15 p.m. CDT
- Game weather: Clear, 54 °F (12 °C)
- Game attendance: 76,957
- Referee: Scott Novak
- TV announcers (WGBA (Green Bay)/WITI (Milwaukee)/Prime Video): Al Michaels, Kirk Herbstreit and Kaylee Hartung
- Recap, Game Book

Game information

**First quarter**

- CAR – Ryan Fitzgerald 39-yard field goal, 11:43. Panthers 3–0. **Drive: 6 plays, 8 yards, 3:12.**
- GB – Tucker Kraft 12-yard pass from Jordan Love (kick failed), 5:08. Packers 6–3. **Drive: 8 plays, 56 yards, 3:33.**

**Second quarter**

- CAR – Chuba Hubbard 1-yard rush (Ryan Fitzgerald kick), 14:57. Panthers 10–6. **Drive: 13 plays, 65 yards, 5:11.**
- GB – Josh Jacobs 1-yard rush (Trey Smack kick), 6:33. Packers 13–10. **Drive: 9 plays, 90 yards, 4:47.**
- GB – Matthew Golden 24-yard pass from Jordan Love (Trey Smack kick), 1:46. Packers 20–10. **Drive: 8 plays, 43 yards, 3:32.**

**Third quarter**

- GB – Josh Jacobs 4-yard pass from Jordan Love (Trey Smack kick), 7:30. Packers 27–10. **Drive: 8 plays, 50 yards, 4:48.**
- CAR – Ryan Fitzgerald 50-yard field goal, 4:07. Packers 27–13. **Drive: 8 plays, 37 yards, 3:23.**

**Fourth quarter**

- CAR – Jalen Coker 26-yard pass from Bryce Young (pass failed), 5:37. Packers 27–19. **Drive: 12 plays, 70 yards, 5:03.**

**Top passers**

- CAR – Bryce Young – 23/31, 209 yards, TD, INT
- GB – Jordan Love – 30/41, 288 yards, 3 TD, INT

**Top rushers**

- CAR – Chuba Hubbard – 22 rushes, 81 yards, TD
- GB – Josh Jacobs – 21 rushes, 39 yards, TD

**Top receivers**

- CAR – Tetairoa McMillan – 6 receptions, 58 yards
- GB – Christian Watson – 8 receptions, 113 yards

In the rematch of last year's upset, the Packers honored former team president/CEO Bob Harlan during halftime. A group of Milwaukee Brewers players were in attendance after winning the 2026 World Series the previous night.

Despite committing three turnovers (including a fumble on the opening kickoff) and forcing only one turnover, the Packers built a 27–10 lead in the third quarter and held on for a 27–19 victory to avenge last year's upset defeat.

==== Week 9: at New England Patriots ====
Week 9: Green Bay Packers at New England Patriots – Game summary

Quarter	1	2	3	4	Total
**Packers**	14	10	18	3	**45**
Patriots	0	14	7	6	**27**

at Gillette Stadium, Foxborough, Massachusetts

- Date: November 8
- Game time: 4:25 p.m. EST/3:25 p.m. CST
- Game weather: Clear, 52 °F (11 °C)
- Game attendance: 64,628
- Referee: Alex Kemp
- TV announcers (Fox): Kevin Burkhardt, Tom Brady, Erin Andrews and Tom Rinaldi
- Recap, Game Book

Game information

**First quarter**

- GB – Jordan Love 13-yard run (Trey Smack kick), 13:19. Packers 7–0. **Drive: 2 plays, 14 yards, 0:55.**
- GB – Matthew Golden 5-yard pass from Jordan Love (Trey Smack kick), 7:59. Packers 14–0. **Drive: 7 plays, 86 yards, 3:45.**

**Second quarter**

- GB – Trey Smack 41-yard field goal, 13:37. Packers 17–0. **Drive: 12 plays, 75 yards, 6:36.**
- NE – Rhamondre Stevenson 30-yard pass from Drake Maye (Andy Borregales kick), 9:23. Packers 17–7. **Drive: 5 plays, 68 yards, 1:44.**
- GB – Kaleb Johnson 2-yard run (Trey Smack kick), 4:45. Packers 24–7. **Drive: 3 plays, 69 yards, 0:53.**
- NE – Efton Chism III 8-yard pass from Drake Maye (Andy Borregales kick), 2:37. Packers 24–14. **Drive: 4 plays, 64 yards, 2:08.**

**Third quarter**

- GB – Savion Williams 10-yard pass from Jordan Love (Trey Smack kick), 10:51. Packers 31–14. **Drive: 7 plays, 70 yards, 4:09.**
- GB – Trey Smack 51-yard field goal, 5:13. Packers 34–14. **Drive: 7 plays, 45 yards, 3:31.**
- GB – Christian Watson 39-yard pass from Jordan Love (Jordan Love run), 4:10. Packers 42–14. **Drive: 1 play, 39 yards, 0:06.**
- NE – Mack Hollins 22-yard pass from Drake Maye (Andy Borregales kick), 1:11. Packers 42–21. **Drive: 7 plays, 77 yards, 2:59.**

**Fourth quarter**

- GB – Trey Smack 38-yard field goal, 11:51. Packers 45–21. **Drive: 7 plays, 58 yards, 4:20.**
- NE – Corey Kiner 4-yard run (pass failed), 3:54. Packers 45–27. **Drive: 8 plays, 57 yards, 3:02.**

**Top passers**

- GB – Jordan Love – 23/29, 372 yards, 3 TD
- NE – Drake Maye – 21/38, 299 yards, 3 TD, 3 INT

**Top rushers**

- GB – Kaleb Johnson – 14 rushes, 68 yards, TD
- NE – Corey Kiner – 8 rushes, 55 yards, TD

**Top receivers**

- GB – Christian Watson – 7 receptions, 171 yards, TD
- NE – DeMario Douglas – 5 receptions, 102 yards

The Packers set the record for the most points scored by a visiting team at Gillette Stadium as Jordan Love dominated through the air and Christian Watson and Matthew Golden became the first Packers receiving duo since 1942 to have 150 or more receiving yards to go with a touchdown catch.

==== Week 10: vs. Minnesota Vikings ====
Week 10: Minnesota Vikings at Green Bay Packers – Game summary

Quarter	1	2	3	4	Total
**Vikings**	10	7	3	10	**30**
Packers	0	0	10	0	**10**

at Lambeau Field, Green Bay, Wisconsin

- Date: November 15
- Game time: 12:00 p.m. CST
- Game weather: Sunny, 45 °F (7 °C)
- Game attendance: 78,332
- Referee: Clete Blakeman
- TV announcers (Fox): Adam Amin, Drew Brees and Kristina Pink
- Recap, Game Book

Game information

**First quarter**

- MIN – Will Reichard 34-yard field goal, 10:20. Vikings 3–0. **Drive: 4 plays, -6 yards, 2:21.**
- MIN – Myles Price 38-yard pass from Kirk Cousins (Will Reichard kick), 2:46. Vikings 10–0. **Drive: 7 plays, 57 yards, 3:14.**

**Second quarter**

- MIN – Aaron Jones 1-yard run (Will Reichard kick), 6:17. Vikings 17–0. **Drive: 11 plays, 55 yards, 5:22.**

**Third quarter**

- MIN – Will Reichard 32-yard field goal, 10:02. Vikings 20–0. **Drive: 5 plays, 18 yards, 2:08.**
- GB – J. Michael Sturdivant 32-yard pass from Jordan Love (Trey Smack kick), 5:37. Vikings 20–7. **Drive: 10 plays, 75 yards, 4:25.**
- GB – Trey Smack 40-yard field goal, 0:19. Vikings 20–10. **Drive: 11 plays, 64 yards, 3:38.**

**Fourth quarter**

- MIN – Gavin Bartholomew 20-yard pass from Kirk Cousins (Will Reichard kick), 8:29. Vikings 27–10. **Drive: 11 plays, 75 yards, 6:50.**
- MIN – Will Reichard 20-yard field goal, 3:56. Vikings 30–10. **Drive: 9 plays, 33 yards, 4:28.**

**Top passers**

- MIN – Kirk Cousins – 21/31, 207 yards, 2 TD, INT
- GB – Jordan Love – 17/27, 220 yards, TD, INT

**Top rushers**

- MIN – Jordan Mason – 16 rushes, 59 yards
- GB – Kaleb Johnson – 10 rushes, 42 yards

**Top receivers**

- MIN – Justin Jefferson – 9 receptions, 74 yards
- GB – Matthew Golden – 5 receptions, 70 yards

Despite being a 2.5-point home favorite, the Packers were shut out in the first half down 17–0 and thus, failed to recover as they lost 30–10 to the Vikings, who swept them for the second time in three years, while also sending the Packers into their bye week with a 6–4 record.

==== Week 12: at Los Angeles Rams ====
Thanksgiving Eve games

Week 12: Green Bay Packers at Los Angeles Rams – Game summary

Quarter	1	2	3	4	Total
Packers	0	0	0	0	**0**
Rams	0	0	0	0	**0**

at SoFi Stadium, Inglewood, California

- Date: November 25
- Game time: 7:00 p.m. CST/5:00 p.m. PST
- Game weather: TBD (fixed roof)
- TV announcers (Netflix): Noah Eagle and Luke Kuechly
- Preview

=== Standings ===
==== Division ====
NFC North
	W	L	T	PCT	DIV	CONF	PF	PA	STK
Detroit Lions	7	2	0	.778	2–0	4–1	257	199	W5
Minnesota Vikings	7	2	0	.778	3–1	5–1	176	126	W1
Chicago Bears	7	2	0	.778	0–2	5–2	241	184	W4
Green Bay Packers	6	4	0	.600	1–3	4–4	226	221	L1

==== Conference ====
NFC
Seed	Team	Division	W	L	T	PCT	DIV	CONF	SOS	SOV	STK
**Division leaders**
1	San Francisco 49ers	West	8	1	0	.889	3–0	5–1	.431	.448	W2
2 (Note: Detroit wins tie break over Minnesota and Chicago based on head-to-head record.)	Detroit Lions	North	7	2	0	.778	2–0	4–1	.459	.403	W5
3	New York Giants	East	5	3	1	.611	2–1–1	3–3–1	.353	.292	L1
4	Carolina Panthers	South	4	5	0	.444	2–1	4–3	.524	.405	W1
**Wild cards**
5 (Note: Minnesota wins tie break over Chicago based on head-to-head victory.)	Minnesota Vikings	North	7	2	0	.778	3–1	5–1	.518	.433	W1
6	Chicago Bears	North	7	2	0	.778	0–2	5–2	.442	.373	W4
7 (Note: Green Bay wins tie break over Seattle based on conference record. Division tie break was initially used to eliminate LA Rams (see below).)	Green Bay Packers	North	6	4	0	.600	1–3	4–4	.521	.439	L1
**In the hunt**
8 (Note: Seattle wins tie break over LA Rams based on division record.)	Seattle Seahawks	West	6	4	0	.600	2–1	2–3	.516	.397	W2
9	Los Angeles Rams	West	6	4	0	.600	1–2	4–2	.484	.339	W4
10	Dallas Cowboys	East	4	6	0	.400	2–1	2–5	.438	.321	L1
11	Washington Commanders	East	3	5	1	.389	2–2–1	3–4–1	.488	.482	W1
12 (Note: Tampa Bay wins tie break over New Orleans based on division record.)	Tampa Bay Buccaneers	South	3	6	0	.333	2–0	3–3	.588	.379	L1
13	New Orleans Saints	South	3	6	0	.333	0–2	1–4	.547	.534	L1
14 (Note: Atlanta wins tie break over Arizona based on conference record.)	Atlanta Falcons	South	3	7	0	.300	1–2	3–3	.598	.607	L3
15	Arizona Cardinals	West	3	7	0	.300	1–4	2–6	.595	.379	L2
16	Philadelphia Eagles	East	2	7	0	.222	1–3	1–6	.500	.250	L7

== Statistics ==
=== Starters ===
==== Regular season ====
Offense

Pos.	Name	GS
QB	Jordan Love	9
RB	MarShawn Lloyd; Josh Jacobs; Chris Brooks	4; 3; 2
WR	Christian Watson	9
WR2	Matthew Golden; Bo Melton	7; 1
WR3	Savion Williams; Jayden Reed	3; 2
TE	Tucker Kraft	9
TE2	Mark Redman	3
TE3	Josh Whyle	1
LT	Jordan Morgan	9
LG	Laken Tomlinson; Aaron Banks; Jager Burton; Donovan Jennings	4; 3; 1; 1
C	Sean Rhyan; John Williams	7; 2
RG	Travis Glover; Jacob Monk; Laken Tomlinson	4; 3; 2
RT	Anthony Belton; Zach Bako-Bewele	7; 2

Defense

Pos.	Name	GS
DE1	Barryn Sorrell	9
DT1	Devonte Wyatt	9
DT2	Karl Brooks	9
DT3	Jonathan Ford; Chris McClellan	1; 1
DE2	Lukas Van Ness	9
LB1	Zaire Franklin; Ty'Ron Hopper	6; 3
LB2	Isaiah McDuffie; Edgerrin Cooper	5; 4
CB	Keisean Nixon	9
CB2	Brandon Cisse	9
S	Xavier McKinney	9
S2	Evan Williams	9
S3	Javon Bullard	7

=== Team leaders ===
Category	Player(s)	Value
Passing yards	Jordan Love	2,618
Passing touchdowns	Jordan Love	19
Rushing yards	Kaleb Johnson	172
Rushing touchdowns	MarShawn Lloyd	2
Receptions	Matthew Golden	53
Receiving yards	Christian Watson	879
Receiving touchdowns	Christian Watson	7
Kickoff return yards	Bo Melton	372
Punt return yards	Skyy Moore	128
Tackles	Evan Williams	76
Sacks	Lukas Van Ness	4.5
Interceptions	Xavier McKinney	5

=== League rankings ===
Category	Total yards	Yards per game	NFL rank (out of 32)
Passing offense	2517	279.7	1st
Rushing offense	614	68.2	32nd
Total offense	3131	347.9	5th
Passing defense	1925	213.9	20th
Rushing defense	981	109.0	18th
Total defense	2906	322.9	19th

Category	Total points	Points per game	NFL rank (out of 32)
Offensive points scored	216	24.0	9th
Defensive points allowed	191	21.2	15th

Statistical values are correct through November 9, 2026

== Awards ==
Recipient	Award(s)
Brandon Cisse	October NFL Defensive Rookie of the Month
Jordan Love	Week 5: FedEx Air & Ground Player of the Week; Week 8: FedEx Air & Ground Player of the Week; Week 9: NFC Player of the Week; Week 9: FedEx Air & Ground Player of the Week
Evan Williams	October NFL Defensive Player of the Month
