= Brian Gutekunst =

American football executive (born 1973)

Green Bay Packers
- Title: General manager

Personal information
- Born: July 19, 1973 (age 53); Raleigh, North Carolina, U.S.

Career information
- College: Wisconsin–La Crosse (1993–1994)

Career history

Coaching
- Wisconsin–La Crosse (1995–1996) Linebackers coach

Operations
- Kansas City Chiefs (1998) Scout; Green Bay Packers (1999-present); Scout (1999-2011); Director of college scouting (2012-2015); Director of player personnel (2016-2017); General manager (2018-present)

Awards and highlights
- Super Bowl champion (XLV)
- Executive profile at Pro Football Reference

Brian Willis Gutekunst (born July 19, 1973) is an American professional football executive who is the general manager for the Green Bay Packers of the National Football League (NFL). He joined the team in 1998 and served as a scout and assistant executive before being promoted to general manager in 2018.

== Biography ==
Gutekunst was born on July 19, 1973, in Raleigh, North Carolina. His father, John Gutekunst, was the head coach of the Minnesota Golden Gophers football team. Gutekunst attended the University of Wisconsin–La Crosse. Afterwards, he served as an assistant coach with the team, including during their 1995 Division III National Championship season.

== Scouting career ==
Gutekunst spent most of the 1998 NFL season with the Kansas City Chiefs as a scouting assistant. He then joined the Packers as a college scout for the East Coast of the United States. Gutekunst assumed his position as director of college scouting in 2012. He was promoted to director of player personnel in March 2016.

== General manager career ==
In January 2018, Packers general manager Ted Thompson, who had been recently diagnosed with a neurodegenerative disorder, assumed a reduced role and named Gutekunst to the position after interviewing other internal candidates.

=== 2018 ===
The Packers were over the salary cap for the upcoming 2018 season, as Jordy Nelson and Morgan Burnett would be lost to new teams in free agency and traded away former first round draft pick Damarious Randall to the Cleveland Browns for DeShone Kizer. In the 2018 NFL draft, the Packers selected Jaire Alexander out of the University of Louisville with the 18th pick of the first round. Later, the Packers took CB Joshua Jackson from Iowa, LB Oren Burks from Vanderbilt, WRs J'Mon Moore in the fourth round, Marquez Valdes-Scantling in the fifth round and Equanimeous St. Brown from Notre Dame, who ended up in the sixth round. They also drafted J. K. Scott and Hunter Bradley, and undrafted free agent players like Tim Boyle, James Crawford, Raven Greene, Tyler Lancaster and Alex Light. In August, the Packers traded Brett Hundley to the Seattle Seahawks. In midseason, the Packers traded away Ha Ha Clinton-Dix and Ty Montgomery. On December 2, 2018, after a 4–7–1 start, the team fired Mike McCarthy.

=== 2019 ===
On January 7, 2019, the Packers hired Matt LaFleur as their new head coach. In the offseason, the Packers lost Randall Cobb and Clay Matthews to free agency, but they signed former Chicago Bears safety Adrian Amos as well as Linebackers Preston Smith and Za'Darius Smith. In the 2019 NFL draft, the team selected Michigan linebacker Rashan Gary with the 12th pick and Maryland safety Darnell Savage with the 21st pick. They also drafted Elgton Jenkins from Mississippi State in the second round. In August, the Packers traded Reggie Gilbert to the Tennessee Titans and Justin McCray to the Cleveland Browns, then they got B. J. Goodson from the New York Giants.

=== 2020 ===
In free agency, the Packers signed former Cleveland Browns linebacker Christian Kirksey and offensive tackle Rick Wagner from the Detroit Lions following the departure of Bryan Bulaga and Blake Martinez. In the 2020 NFL draft, the Packers drafted quarterback Jordan Love out of Utah State, and later they selected Boston College running back A. J. Dillon, as well as Cincinnati tight end Josiah Deguara in the third round and Jon Runyan Jr. in the sixth round.

=== 2023 ===
On April 26, 2023, the Packers traded Aaron Rodgers to the New York Jets. In the 2023 NFL draft, the Packers selected Iowa pass rusher Lukas Van Ness with the 13th pick. Additionally, they drafted wide receivers Jayden Reed in the second round and Dontayvion Wicks in the fifth round, tight ends Luke Musgrave and Tucker Kraft, Penn State quarterback Sean Clifford as their next backup, Auburn Kicker Anders Carlson, defensive players like Colby Wooden, Karl Brooks, Carrington Valentine and Anthony Johnson Jr. and undrafted free agent additions of Malik Heath and Emanuel Wilson. They also added Daniel Whelan, Matthew Orzech and Jonathan Owens, then claimed second year Zayne Anderson and rookie tight end Ben Sims. By midseason, the Packers traded Rasul Douglas to the Buffalo Bills.

=== 2024 ===
Over the offseason, the Packers released David Bakhtiari, De'Vondre Campbell and Aaron Jones as free agents and had additions of Josh Jacobs and Xavier McKinney and notable 2024 NFL draft picks such as Jordan Morgan in the first round, linebacker Edgerrin Cooper and safeties Javon Bullard and Evan Williams. Bullard became the fourth Georgia player ever drafted by the Packers. In August, the Packers traded for Malik Willis from the Tennessee Titans, and they released second year players like Anders Carlson, Sean Clifford, Anthony Johnson Jr. and Benny Sapp III. In October, the Packers signed former Denver Broncos kicker Brandon McManus, and in November, they traded Preston Smith to the Pittsburgh Steelers.

=== 2025 ===
In the offseason, the Packers' notable departures of A. J. Dillon, Eric Stokes, Josh Myers, and Tedarrell Slaton into free agents. In additions of former 49ers guard Aaron Banks and former Raiders Cornerback Nate Hobbs. In the 2025 NFL draft, the Packers drafted two new wide receiver additions: Matthew Golden in the first round and Savion Williams in the third round. In August of that same year, the Packers traded for Micah Parsons from the Dallas Cowboys for Kenny Clark, and two 1st round draft picks.

=== 2026 ===
On January 30, 2026, Gutekunst and the Packers agreed to a multi-year contract extension.Over the offseason the Packers were over the salary cap as well they released Trevon Diggs, Elgton Jenkins, Nate Hobbs and Brandon McManus into free agency. Green Bay also lost Malik Willis, Emanuel Wilson, Romeo Doubs, Rasheed Walker, Kingsley Enagbare, Quay Walker and Zayne Anderson to free agency while trading Rashan Gary to the Dallas Cowboys and fourth year Colby Wooden to the Indianapolis Colts in exchange for former Pro Bowl linebacker Zaire Franklin and Dontayvion Wicks to the Philadelphia Eagles. In 2026 NFL Draft the Packers add more defensive player like Brandon Cisse, Chris McClellan and Dani Dennis-Sutton, Dennis-Sutton became the fourth Penn State player ever drafted by the Packers.
