= Jordan Love =

American football player (born 1998)

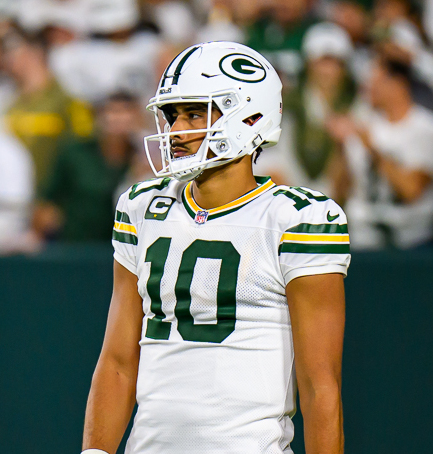
- Love with the Green Bay Packers in 2025

No. 10 – Green Bay Packers
- Position: Quarterback
- Roster status: Active

Personal information
- Born: November 2, 1998 (age 28); Bakersfield, California, U.S.
- Listed height: 6 ft 4 in (1.93 m)
- Listed weight: 219 lb (99 kg)

Career information
- High school: Liberty (Bakersfield)
- College: Utah State (2016–2019)
- NFL draft: 2020: 1st round, 26th overall pick

Career history
- Green Bay Packers (2020–present)

Awards and highlights
- Second-team All-MW (2018)

Career NFL statistics as of Week 10, 2026
- Passing attempts: 1,894
- Passing completions: 1,213
- Completion percentage: 64.0%
- TD–INT: 103–38
- Passing yards: 14,373
- Passer rating: 96.8
- Stats at Pro Football Reference

Jordan Alexander Love (born November 2, 1998) is an American professional football quarterback for the Green Bay Packers of the National Football League (NFL). Love, who was born and raised in Bakersfield, California, attended Liberty High School, where he began playing for the school's football team. He received an athletic scholarship from Utah State University to play college football for the Utah State Aggies. While with the Aggies, he was named to the second-team All-MWC in 2018 and was selected as the most valuable player of the 2018 New Mexico Bowl. For his college career, he threw for over 8,000 yards, 60 passing touchdowns, and another 9 rushing touchdowns.

After announcing that he would forgo his senior year of college, Love was drafted by the Packers in the first round with the 26th pick of the 2020 NFL draft. He served as a backup to starter Aaron Rodgers for three years before being named the Green Bay's starting quarterback at the beginning of the 2023 NFL season. He has led the Packers to the playoffs his first three seasons as starter, including a playoff victory over the Dallas Cowboys in 2023. Love signed a four-year contract extension worth $220 million prior to the start of the 2024 NFL season. Through his first three seasons as a starter, Love threw for over 10,000 yards and 80 touchdown passes, while being named one of the NFL's Top 100 players in 2024 and 2025.

== Early life ==
Love was born in Bakersfield, California, on November 2, 1998. His father, Orbin Jr., was a police officer for the Bakersfield Police Department, while his mother Anna worked for the California Highway Patrol. Love is biracial as his mother is White and his father was Black. Jordan and his father were close, with Orbin Jr. coaching many of his son's sports teams. Orbin's mental health became abnormal, and he died by suicide when Jordan was 14 years old. Love contemplated quitting football, but his mother encouraged him to continue for another year to make sure he was not making a rash decision. In August 2025, Love chronicled this period of his life in an article in The Players' Tribune titled "None of This Was Supposed to Happen".

Love attended Liberty High School where he played on the football team. Initially small in stature, Love served as the backup quarterback for the freshman team. Midway through his junior year, he became the starting quarterback for the varsity team, a position he held for the rest of high school. As a senior, Love passed for 2,148 yards and 24 touchdowns and rushed for 806 yards with eight touchdowns. He led Liberty to the State semi-final that season. A two-star recruit, he committed to play college football for Utah State over Division I FCS offers from Eastern Washington, Northern Arizona, Northern Colorado, and Sacramento State. His only Division I FBS scholarship offer came from Utah State.

== College career ==
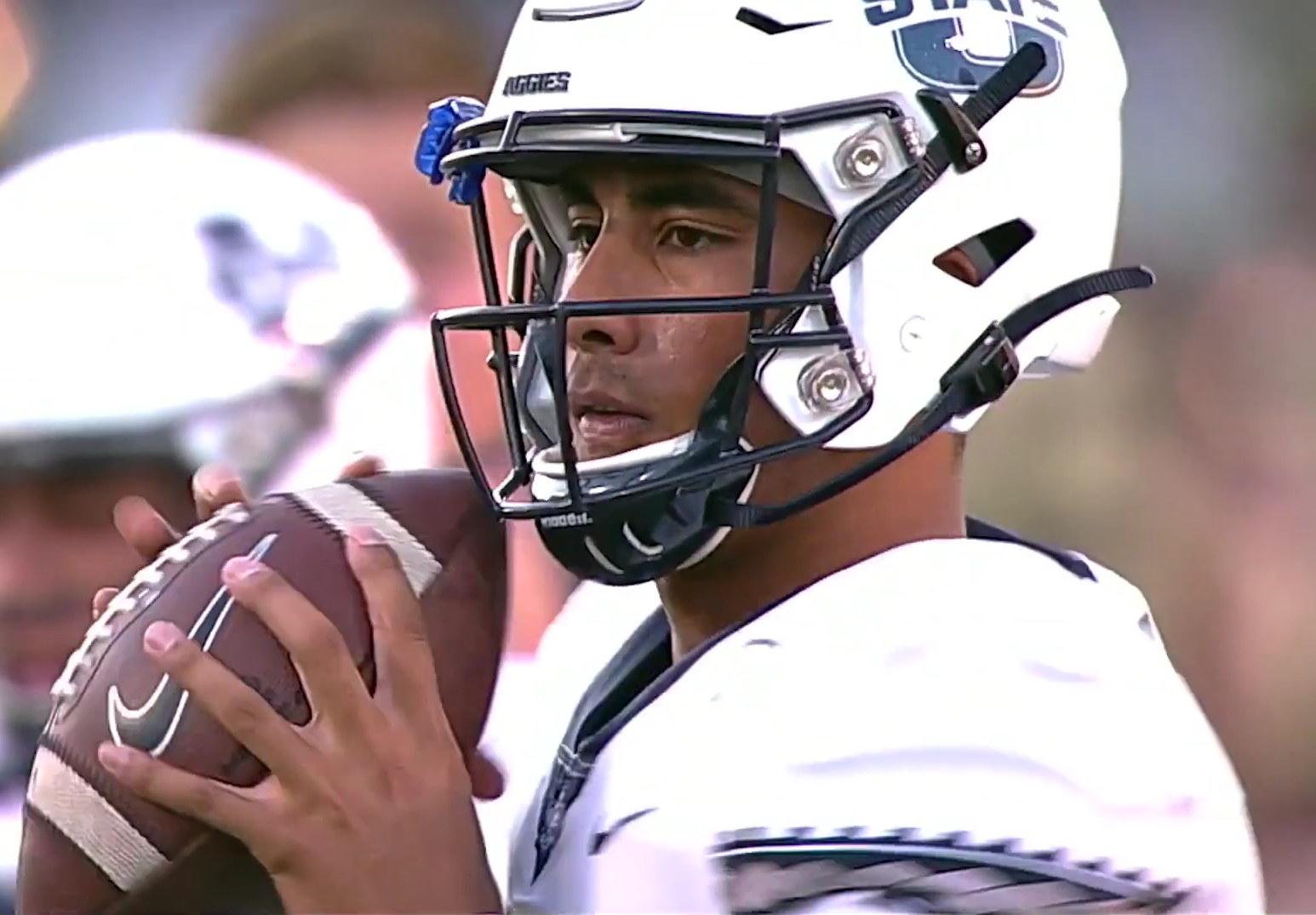
Love in college at Utah State in 2019

Between his freshman year of high school and his first year of college, Love grew nine inches (23 cm) in height and gained 80 pounds (36 kg). He redshirted his first year at Utah State University in 2016. As a freshman in 2017, he played in 12 games and started the final six for the Aggies football team. He finished the season completing 129 of 235 passes for 1,631 yards, 8 touchdowns and 6 interceptions. Following his debut at UNLV, he was named the Mountain West Offensive Player of the Week.

As a sophomore in 2018, Love started all 13 games, completing 267 of 417 passes for a school season record 3,567 yards with 32 touchdowns and six interceptions. He led the Mountain West Conference with a passer rating of 158.3 and yards gained per pass attempt with 8.6, while also completing 64% of his passes. He was named the MVP of the 2018 New Mexico Bowl after passing for 359 yards and four touchdowns. His team finished the season with an 11–2 record and ranked No. 22 on the AP poll. Following his sophomore season, he was expected to be a future NFL first-round draft pick.

In 2019, Love returned to Utah State under a new head coach and offensive coordinator. Many teammates from his previous season had graduated, including four starters on the offensive line. Love again started all 13 games, completing 293 of 473 passes for 3,402 yards with 20 touchdowns and a career-high 17 interceptions; his 17 interceptions led Division 1-A college football. His team slid to a 7–6 record with the changes to the roster and coaching staff. Following the end of the 2019 season, Love announced that he would forgo his senior year and enter the 2020 NFL draft. He completed his college career passing for 8,600 yards, throwing 60 touchdowns against 29 interceptions, and rushing for an additional 403 yards and 9 touchdowns.

== Professional career ==
=== 2020 NFL draft ===
Love participated in the NFL Scouting Combine prior to the NFL draft. NFL.com graded him as the fifth best quarterback in the Combine and projected that he would eventually become a starting quarterback in the NFL. Analyst Lance Zierlein noted in his assessment of Love that "he has the arm to stick throws into tight windows but needs better eye discipline and anticipation to keep windows open. His size, mobility and arm talent combined with his 2018 flashes could be a winning hand that leads a team into the future or a siren's song of erratic play and unfulfilled potential". Love's measurements and performance at the Scouting Combine were praised and increased interest in him as a high draft pick.

After trading up with the Miami Dolphins, the Green Bay Packers drafted Love in the first round (26th pick) in the 2020 draft, making him the first player from a Group of Five conference to be chosen in that draft. The move shocked draft analysts and the news media, as the Packers already had an MVP quarterback in Aaron Rodgers. On July 1, 2020, Love signed his rookie four-year, fully guaranteed contract worth over $12.3 million with a signing bonus of over $6.5 million. It was the first time the 26th pick in the draft received a fully guaranteed contract since the rookie pay scale was changed.

=== Backup years: 2020–2022 ===
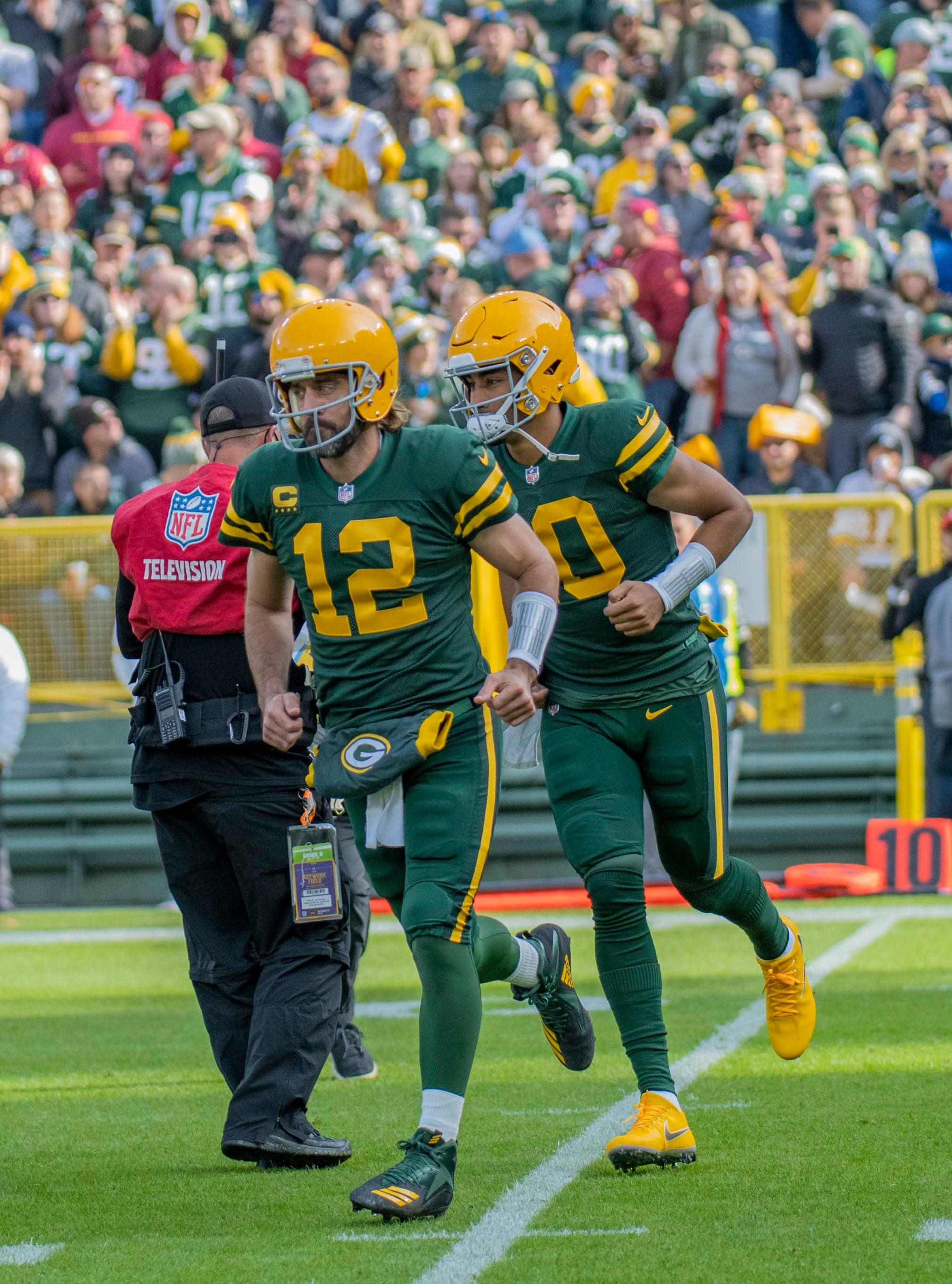
Aaron Rodgers (#12) was the starting quarterback for the first three years of Love's (#10) career (both pictured during a 2021 game)

At the beginning of the 2020 NFL season, the Packers listed Love as the third quarterback on the depth chart, behind Rodgers and third year quarterback Tim Boyle. Love was inactive for every game of the 2020 season, both regular season and the postseason. The Packers finished the 2020 season 13–3, earning the number one seed in the NFC. They went on to lose to the eventual Super Bowl champions Tampa Bay Buccaneers in the NFC Championship Game.

With Boyle signing a contract with the Detroit Lions, the Packers made Love their second-string quarterback behind Rodgers to start the 2021 NFL season. After playing twice in the preseason, Love made his NFL regular season debut in the fourth quarter of a 38–3 loss to the New Orleans Saints on September 12, 2021, in relief of Rodgers. He completed six of eight passes but also lost a fumble. Love made his first NFL start on November 7, 2021, against the Kansas City Chiefs, replacing Rodgers, who had tested positive for COVID-19 four days earlier and was ineligible to play. Love completed 19 of 34 passes for 190 yards, threw one interception, and completed his first NFL touchdown pass to Allen Lazard during a 13–7 loss. With the Packers already securing their spot in the playoffs, Love relieved Rodgers in the second half of the last game of the year against the Lions, where he completed 10 of 17 passes for 134 yards and a touchdown, and ran for a two-point conversion, but also threw two late interceptions as the Packers lost 37–30. The Packers finished the season 13–4, losing to the San Francisco 49ers in the Divisional Round of the playoffs.

Love was again the second-string quarterback behind Rodgers for the 2022 NFL season. He saw limited action in two early season losses and one late season victory. During another late season game against the Philadelphia Eagles, Love replaced an injured Rodgers, completing six of nine passes for 113 yards, with a long touchdown pass to Christian Watson to bring the Packers within one touchdown of tying the game. Love finished the game with a 146.8 passer rating but was unable to complete the comeback, with the Packers losing 40–33. The Packers finished the year 8–9, missing the playoffs for the first time in four seasons.

=== Initial starting years: 2023–2025 ===
During the offseason, there was much speculation from the national media that Rodgers would retire or be traded. After Rodgers announced his intention to play in the 2023 NFL season for the New York Jets, the Packers completed a trade sending Rodgers to New York for draft picks. In doing so, the Packers also named Love the starting quarterback for the 2023 season. In lieu of exercising his fifth-year option, Love signed an incentive-laden one-year contract extension worth up to $22.5 million, covering the 2024 season.

In Love's first start of the 2023 season, he threw for 245 yards and three touchdown passes, as the Packers beat the Chicago Bears 38–20. With that start, Love became only the third different quarterback to start Week 1 for the Packers since 1993, after Brett Favre and Rodgers. Two weeks later, Love completed his first come-from-behind victory with a 18–17 win over the Saints, after the Packers trailed by a score of 17–0 in the fourth quarter. In Week 11 against the Los Angeles Chargers, Love threw for over 300 yards in a game for the first time in his career, leading the Packers to a 23–20 victory. The next week, in Love's first start during a Thanksgiving Day game, he threw for 268 yards and 3 touchdowns to lead the Packers to a 29–22 upset victory over the Lions. In the penultimate game of the season, the Packers secured a victory against the Minnesota Vikings, bringing their record to 8–8. A victory in the last game of the season at home against the Bears would guarantee a berth into the playoffs. Love led the Packers to a 17–9 victory by passing for 316 yards and two touchdown passes, finishing off his first season as the Packers' starting quarterback with 4,159 passing yards, 32 touchdown passes against 11 interceptions, and completing 64.2% of his passes. In his playoff debut against the No. 2 seeded Dallas Cowboys, Love threw for 272 yards and three touchdowns, finishing the game with a near-perfect passer rating of 157.2. With this performance, the Packers became the first No. 7 seed to win a playoff game, winning 48–32. Against the top-seeded 49ers, Love completed 21-of-34 passes for 194 yards and two touchdowns, but threw two interceptions, one of which was a game-sealing pick as the Packers lost 24–21. He was ranked 34th by his fellow players on the NFL Top 100 Players of 2024.

In July 2024, Love signed a new $220 million, four-year extension with the Packers; at an average of $55 million a year, which tied him for the highest average annual value at the time of the signing. The deal included a $75 million signing bonus and $155 million in guaranteed money. The Packers opened the 2024 NFL season against the Eagles in Sao Paulo, Brazil, which marked the NFL's first game in that country. Love completed 17 of 34 passes for 260 yards, two touchdowns and one interception as the Packers lost 34–29. Love suffered an MCL sprain with 15 seconds to play in the fourth quarter. Backup Malik Willis played in his absence for two games, with Love returning ahead of a Week 4 matchup against the Vikings. He completed 32 passes for a career high 389 yards while also throwing four touchdowns and three interceptions as the Packers lost 31–29. Love continued to struggle in the early part of the season, throwing at least one interception in his first eight games of the season. However, he finished the last seven games of the regular season without throwing an interception. The Packers secured a playoff berth, although they lost their last two games of the regular season, including a loss to the Bears that ensured the Packers would be the last seed in the playoffs. Love was injured during the Bears game, but returned the next week for the Wild Card match-up against the Eagles. Love again struggled, throwing three interceptions in a 22–10 loss that ended the Packers' season. Love was again ranked as one of the NFL Top 100 Players of the previous season, this time at number 68.

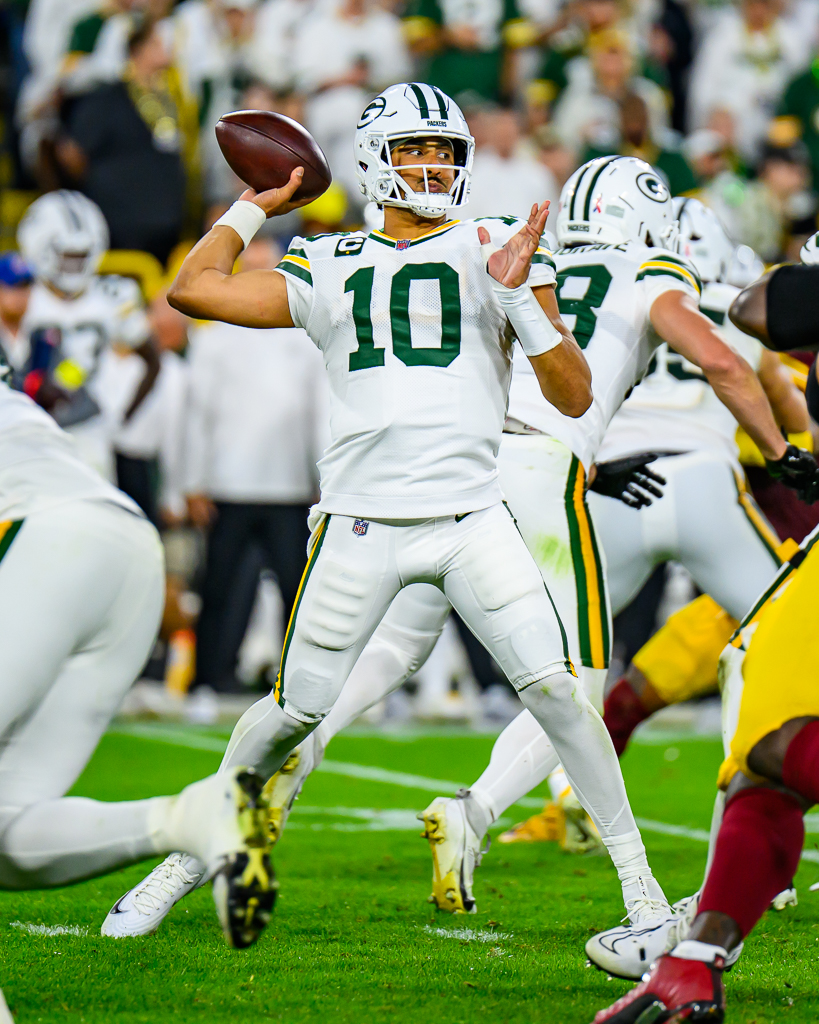
Love attempting a pass during a 2025 game against the Washington Commanders

Love and the Packers began the 2025 NFL season with decisive victories over the Lions and the Washington Commanders, both of whom had made the playoffs the previous season. A week after an upset loss to the Cleveland Browns, the Packers played the Cowboys to a 40–40 tie on Sunday Night Football, with Love throwing for over 300 yards and 3 passing touchdowns. After the team's Week 5 bye week, the Packers beat the Cincinnati Bengals and Arizona Cardinals by a score of 27–18 and 27–23, respectively; Love threw one touchdown pass in each game. For the second time of the season, Love threw for over 300 yards and 3 passing touchdowns on Sunday Night Football, this time beating the Pittsburgh Steelers 35–25. Love, who was facing his old teammate Aaron Rodgers for the first time, completed 20 straight passes during the game, tying Favre for the team record. In Week 13 on Thanksgiving day, Love went 18 for 30 for 234 yards and four touchdowns in a 31–24 win over the Lions, earning NFC Offensive Player of the Week. The next week, Love threw for three touchdown passes against the Chicago Bears, leading the Packers to a 28–21 victory and their fourth straight win.

However, the next week the Packers travelled to Denver to play the Broncos. The Packers started the game strong, but Love threw a deep pass that was intercepted and then Micah Parsons, who the Packers traded for prior to the season, injured his knee and was forced out the rest of the game. The Broncos scored three touchdowns in the second half to secure the win, 34–26. In Week 16, the Packers played the Bears again, this time in Chicago, with the winner securing a lead in the NFC North. In the third quarter, Love was hit in the head while being sacked and left the game with a concussion. Malik Willis came in for Love and threw a touchdown pass. The Packers had a 16–6 lead with two minutes left in the game, but the Bears kicked a field goal, recovered an onside kick, and then scored a touchdown to force overtime. In overtime, Caleb Williams threw a 46-yard touchdown pass to D. J. Moore for a walk-off victory. Love was held out the Packers next game against the Ravens, who ended up blowing out the Packers 41–24 despite Willis having a good game standing in for Love. With playoff seeding mostly set by the last week of the season, the Packers held Love out again, as well as a number of other starters, in their game against the Vikings. The Packers lost 16–3 against the Vikings, finishing the regular season with a four-game losing streak and a final record of 9–7–1. The team secured a Wild Card playoff berth and were matched up against the Bears, their third game of the season against that team. Love returned, throwing for four touchdown passes and over 300 yards, but the Packers gave up a 21–6 fourth quarter lead after giving up 25 points to the Bears in the last quarter. Love finished the season with a 101.2 quarterback rating, the highest for a full season in his career to that point, while throwing for over 3,300 yards with 23 touchdown passes against only 6 interceptions.

=== Established starter: 2026–present ===
Love started the first game of the 2026 NFL season for the Packers, his fourth consecutive year as the team's opening week starting quarterback. The Packers had a shaky start to the 2026 season, going 2–2 in the first four game. Although Love threw for two touchdowns in each game and twice had over 300 yards passing, the Packers suffered from injuries and unsteady play from the offensive line, as well as the absence of running back Josh Jacobs due to a domestic violence incident in the offseason. The Packers lost the first game of the season to the Viking 39–22 after giving up 22 unanswered points in the fourth quarter. They barely won the next game against the Jets 20–17 in overtime, but were then blown out by the Atlanta Falcons 35–14 in Week 3. In Week 4, Love had an efficient game, completing almost three-quarters of his passes, and the Packers won 17–14 against the Buccaneers. Arguably Love's best performance in the first half of the season came the next week, against the Bears, where he threw for 367 yards, 2 touchdown passes, and completed 80% of his passes, leading the Packers to a convincing 31–7 victory against their rivals. The Packers then beat the Cowboys 23–13 on Sunday Night Football, with Love throwing for one touchdown and rushing for another, before a 20–17 loss to the Lions the next week. The loss against the Lions was marred by a poor performance by Packers' kicker Trey Smack, who missed two short field goal attempts. However, on a short week with the Packers playing Thursday Night Football against the Carolina Panthers, Love led his team to a 27–19 victory, throwing three touchdown passes in a game for the first time in the season. The game marked the third consecutive where Love threw over 40 passes, necessitated by the Packers' historically poor rushing attack through the first 8 games of the season. In Week 9, Love was named NFC Offensive Player of the Week, as well as back-to-back as FedEx Air and Ground Player of Week.

== NFL career statistics ==
Legend
^{‡}	Led the league
**Bold**	Career high

=== Regular season ===
Year	Team	Games			Passing									Rushing					Sacks		Fumbles	
Year	Team	GP	GS	Record	Cmp	Att	Pct	Yds	Y/A	Lng	TD	Int	Rtg	Att	Yds	Y/A	Lng	TD	Sck	SckY	Fum	Lost
2020	GB	0	0	—	DNP																	
2021	GB	6	1	0–1	36	62	58.1	411	6.6	62	2	3	68.7	12	27	2.3	10	0	3	23	3	1
2022	GB	4	0	—	14	21	**66.7**	195	**9.3**	63	1	0	**112.2**	1	−1	−1.0	−1	0	0	0	0	0
2023	GB	17	17	9–8	**372**	**579**	64.2	**4,159**	7.2	77	**32**	**11**	96.1	**50**	**247**	**4.9**	**37**	**4**	**30**	**242**	**9**	**3**
2024	GB	15	15	9–6	268	425	63.1	3,389	8.0	70	25	**11**	96.7	25	83	3.3	14	1	14	95	4	0
2025	GB	15	15	9–5–1	291	439	66.3	3,381	7.7	59	23	6	101.2	47	199	4.2	25	0	21	169	7	2
2026	GB	10	10	6–4	232	368	63.0	2,838	7.7	**81**	20	7	96.9	13	23	1.8	13	2	25	160	5	1
Career		67	58	33–24–1	1,213	1,894	64.0	14,373	7.6	81	103	38	96.8	148	578	3.9	37	7	935	689	28	7
Source: Pro-Football-Reference.com

=== Postseason ===
Year	Team	Games			Passing									Rushing					Sacks		Fumbles	
Year	Team	GP	GS	Record	Cmp	Att	Pct	Yds	Y/A	Lng	TD	Int	Rtg	Att	Yds	Y/A	Lng	TD	Sck	SckY	Fum	Lost
2023	GB	2	2	1–1	**37**	**55**	**67.3**	**466**	**8.5**	**46**	**5**	2^{‡}	**108.6**	**6**	2	0.3	3	0	0	0	**1**	0
2024	GB	1	1	0–1	20	33	60.6	212	6.4	29	0	**3**	41.5	2	10	5.0	**11**	0	**2**	**17**	0	0
2025	GB	1	1	0–1	24	46	52.2	323	7.0	36	4	0	103.8^{‡}	1	**11**	**11.0**	**11**	0	1	1	**1**	0
Career		4	4	1–3	81	134	60.4	1,001	7.5	46	9	5	90.4	9	23	2.6	11	0	3	18	2	0
Source: Pro-Football-Reference.com

== Personal life ==
In late 2019, Love and two of his college football teammates were cited for possession of marijuana. The charges were later dropped, with prosecutors citing a lack of evidence for the dismissal. Love started dating professional volleyball player Ronika Stone in 2020; Stone has a connection to professional football, with her father Ron Stone having played in the NFL for 12 seasons. Love and Stone announced their engagement in June 2024 and got married in June 2025. They announced the birth of their daughter in May 2026.

Love founded a charitable organization called "Hands of 10ve" with a mission to "encourage kids to participate in sports; bring awareness to mental health and suicide issues; and to continue [Love's] dad's work in uniting law enforcement with the community." The organization, which Love dedicated to his father, provides youth football teams with new cleats each year.
