= Noah Pauley =

American football coach

Green Bay Packers
- Title: Wide receivers coach

Personal information
- Born: Duluth, Minnesota, U.S.

Career information
- College: Minnesota Duluth

Career history
- Minnesota Duluth (2011) Student assistant; Minnesota Duluth (2013–2014) Graduate assistant; Minnesota Duluth (2016–2018) Offensive coordinator & wide receivers coach; North Dakota State (2019–2022) Wide receivers coach; Iowa State (2023) Wide receivers coach; Iowa State (2024–2025) Pass game coordinator & wide receivers coach; Green Bay Packers (2026–present) Wide receivers coach

Awards and highlights
- 2024 FootballScoop National Wide Receivers Coach of the Year

Noah Pauley is an American football coach who is the wide receivers coach for the Green Bay Packers of the National Football League (NFL). He previously coached wide receivers at Iowa State, North Dakota State, and Penn State.

== Coaching career ==
=== Minnesota Duluth ===
Pauley began his coaching career at his alma mater, Minnesota Duluth, serving as a student assistant in 2011 and later returning as a graduate assistant (2013–2014). He eventually became the Bulldogs' offensive coordinator and wide receivers coach from 2016 to 2018. During his time as offensive coordinator, Minnesota Duluth produced one of the most productive offensive stretches in program history, including high marks in yards, scoring, and time of possession.

=== North Dakota State ===
Pauley joined North Dakota State in 2019 as wide receivers coach, spending four seasons with the program and helping the Bison win two Missouri Valley Football Conference titles and two FCS national championships (2019, 2021).

At NDSU, he coached future NFL wide receiver Christian Watson and was credited with Watson's development into an FCS All-American and multiple-time all-conference selection. In the summer of 2022, Pauley worked with the Green Bay Packers as part of the NFL's Bill Walsh Diversity Coaching Fellowship, focusing on wide receivers.

=== Iowa State ===
Pauley was hired by Iowa State in 2023 to coach wide receivers and added pass game coordinator duties in 2024 and 2025.

In 2024, Iowa State produced one of the most prolific receiver tandems in school history, with Jayden Higgins and Jaylin Noel each surpassing 1,000 receiving yards, as the Cyclones reached the Big 12 Championship Game and won the Pop-Tarts Bowl. For his work with Iowa State's receivers, Pauley was named FootballScoop's National Wide Receivers Coach of the Year for the 2024 season.

In 2025, Iowa State's wide receiver unit again produced multiple All-Big 12 honorable mention selections, including Chase Sowell and Brett Eskildsen, with both receivers ranking among the team's leaders in receptions and receiving yards.

By the end of his Iowa State tenure, Pauley had built a reputation as a developer of NFL-caliber receivers; multiple reports noted he had interviewed for an NFL offensive coordinator opening following the 2024 season.

=== Penn State ===
After the 2025 season, Pauley joined Penn State as wide receivers coach under head coach Matt Campbell.

=== Green Bay Packers ===
In February 2026, Pauley was hired by the Green Bay Packers as wide receivers coach, reuniting with Christian Watson, whom he coached at North Dakota State.

Reports describing Pauley as a "rising star" emphasized his rapid progression through the college ranks and his track record developing high-end receiver production at Iowa State and North Dakota State.

== Coaching profile ==
Pauley has been characterized in multiple bios as a receivers developer and recruiter, with experience coordinating the pass game as Iowa State's pass game coordinator in addition to positional coaching.

== Personal life ==
Pauley is married to Hannah and has two daughters.
