= Tucker Kraft =

American football player (born 2000)

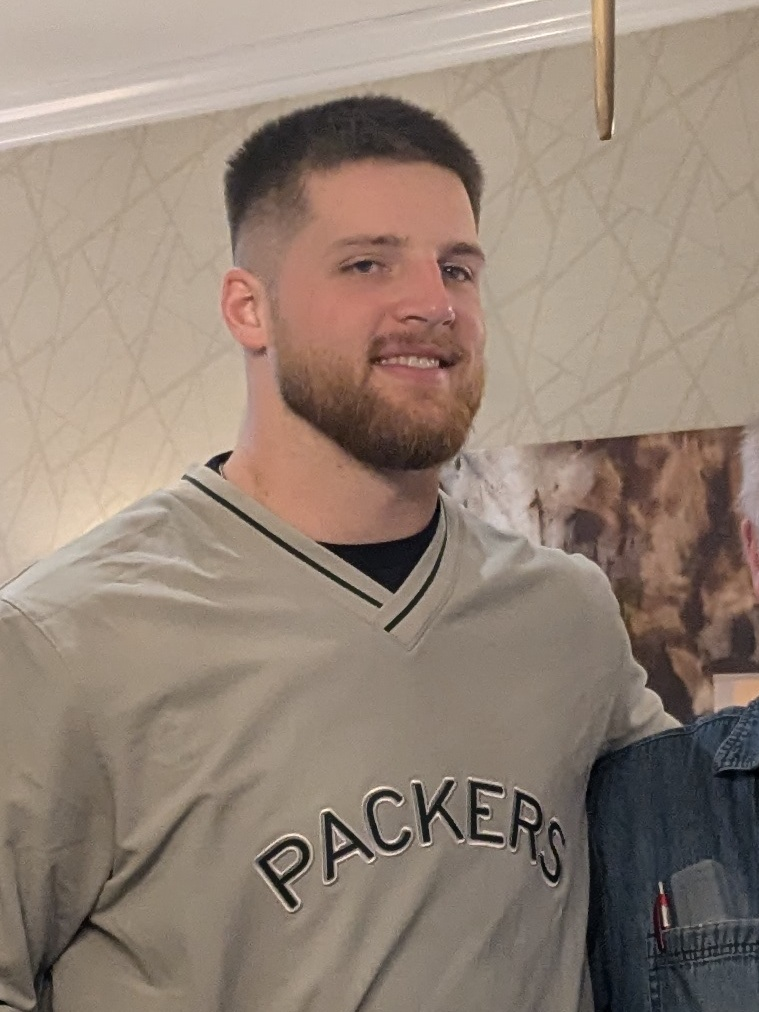
- Kraft in 2025

No. 85 – Green Bay Packers
- Position: Tight end
- Roster status: Active

Personal information
- Born: November 3, 2000 (age 26); Timber Lake, South Dakota, U.S.
- Listed height: 6 ft 5 in (1.96 m)
- Listed weight: 259 lb (117 kg)

Career information
- High school: Timber Lake
- College: South Dakota State (2019–2022)
- NFL draft: 2023: 3rd round, 78th overall pick

Career history
- Green Bay Packers (2023–present)

Awards and highlights
- FCS national champion (2022); FCS All-American (2021, 2022); 2× First-team All-MVFC (2021, 2022)

Career NFL statistics as of Week 10, 2026
- Receptions: 150
- Receiving yards: 1,921
- Receiving touchdowns: 18
- Rushing yards: 22
- Stats at Pro Football Reference

Tucker John Kraft (born November 3, 2000) is an American professional football tight end for the Green Bay Packers of the National Football League (NFL). He played college football for the South Dakota State Jackrabbits and was selected by the Packers in the third round of the 2023 NFL draft.

== Early life ==
Kraft was born on November 3, 2000, in Timber Lake, South Dakota. His father, Doug Kraft, died in 2013. He has two brothers named Cody and Tanner Kraft.

Kraft grew up on the Cheyenne River Sioux Tribe Reservation and in April 2024 he was named an honorary tribal member for his acts of service to the community. Kraft wears a Cheyenne River Sioux tribal flag on his football helmet alongside the American flag.

He later attended Timber Lake High School, where he played running back, middle linebacker, and punter on the football team. As a senior, Kraft rushed for 1,405 yards and 24 touchdowns and was named first team All-State. He committed to play college football at South Dakota State over a late offer from Wyoming.

== College career ==
Kraft redshirted his true freshman season. He caught seven passes for 90 yards during the spring 2021 season, which was delayed from the fall due to the COVID-19 pandemic. As a redshirt sophomore, Kraft started all 15 of South Dakota State's games and had 65 receptions for 780 yards and six touchdowns. He was named consensus FCS All-American and All-Missouri Valley Football Conference (MVFC).

== Professional career ==
Pre-draft measurables
Height	Weight	Arm length	Hand span	Wingspan	40-yard dash	10-yard split	20-yard split	20-yard shuttle	Three-cone drill	Vertical jump	Broad jump	Bench press
6 ft 4 3/4 in (1.95 m)	254 lb (115 kg)	32 3/4 in (0.83 m)	10 in (0.25 m)	6 ft 7 3/8 in (2.02 m)	4.63 s	1.64 s	2.60 s	4.29 s	7.08 s	36.5 in (0.93 m)	10 ft 2 in (3.10 m)	23 reps
All values from NFL Combine/Pro Day

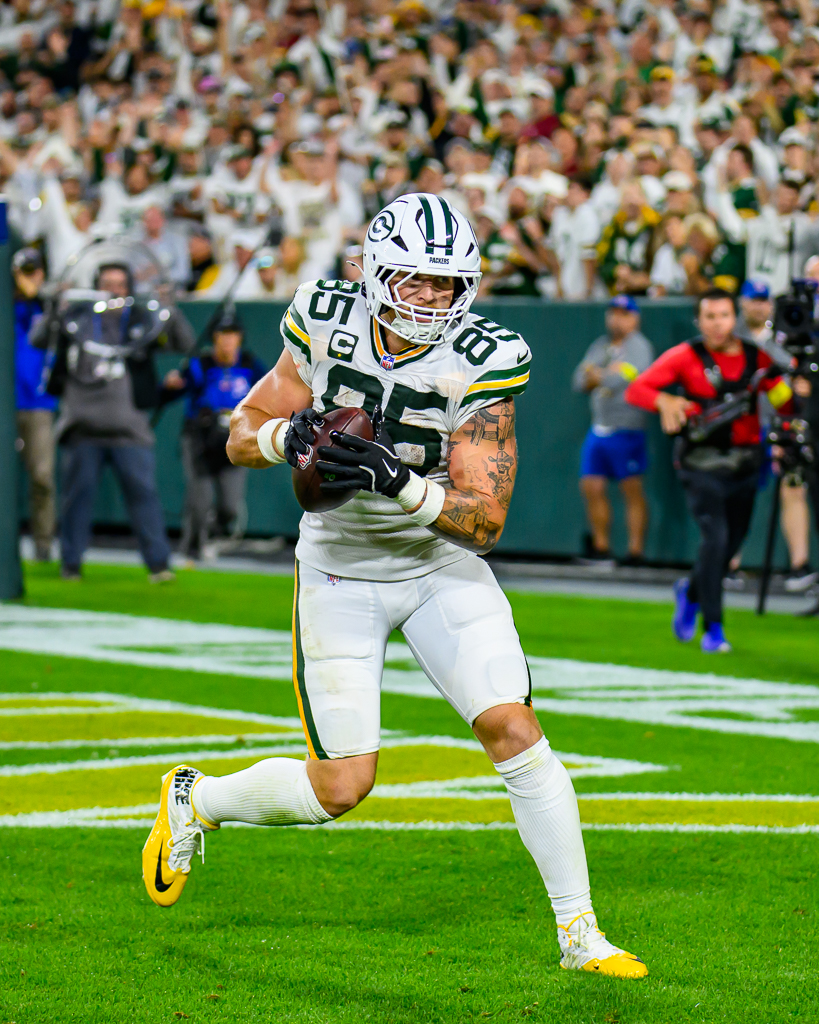
Kraft catching a pass during a 2025 game.

=== 2023 season ===
Kraft was selected in the third round, 78th overall, by the Green Bay Packers in the 2023 NFL draft. He signed his rookie contract on May 17. In Week 11, against the Lions, he scored his first NFL touchdown. In Week 14 against the New York Giants, Kraft had a career-high game in yardage with 64 yards in four receptions. As a rookie, he appeared in all 17 games and made eight starts. He finished with 31 receptions for 355 yards and two touchdowns. In the Divisional Round loss to the 49ers, Kraft scored his first playoff touchdown.

=== 2024 season ===
In May 2024, Kraft suffered a torn pectoral muscle, causing him to miss part of Green Bay's offseason training program. After Luke Musgrave suffered an injury, Kraft was named the starting tight end end for the 2024 season.

=== 2025 season ===
On October 26, 2025, in a Week 8 matchup against the Pittsburgh Steelers, Kraft caught seven passes for a career-high 143 yards and two touchdowns on National Tight End’s Day. He made eight starts for Green Bay, recording 32 receptions for 489 yards and six touchdowns.

In Week 9 against the Carolina Panthers, Kraft suffered a serious knee injury early in the third quarter and had to be carted into the locker room. On the day following the game, an MRI confirmed that Kraft tore his ACL, ending his season.

=== 2026 season ===
Kraft playing for the Green Bay Packers in an October 11, 2026, game against the Chicago Bears

On September 12, 2026, Green Bay Packers and Kraft agreed to a four-year, $75 million contract extension with a signing bonus of $26.5 million.

== NFL career statistics ==
Legend
**Bold**	Career high

=== Regular season ===
Year	Team	Games		Receiving					Fumbles	
Year	Team	GP	GS	Rec	Yds	Y/R	Lng	TD	Fum	Lost
2023	GB	17	8	31	355	11.5	43	2	0	0
2024	GB	17	17	**50**	**707**	14.1	**67**	**7**	**1**	**1**
2025	GB	8	8	32	489	**15.3**	59	6	0	0
2026	GB	10	10	37	370	10.0	46	3	1	0
Total		52	43	150	1,921	12.8	67	18	2	1
Source: pro-football-reference.com

=== Postseason ===
Year	Team	Games		Receiving					Rushing					Fumbles	
Year	Team	GP	GS	Rec	Yds	Y/R	Lng	TD	Rec	Yds	Y/R	Lng	TD	Fum	Lost
2023	GB	2	2	**5**	24	4.8	10	**1**	0	0	0.0	0	0	0	0
2024	GB	1	1	**5**	**26**	**5.0**	**12**	0	**2**	**10**	**5.0**	**8**	0	0	0
Career		3	3	10	50	5.0	12	1	2	10	5.0	8	0	0	0
Source: pro-football-reference.com

== Personal life ==
Kraft is a Christian.

On May 18, 2024, he married Baylee Jandahl, a graphic designer. They became parents, to a daughter named Charlotte, in early 2025.

=== Politics ===
In Spring 2026, he commented on Instagram on a video of Republican President Donald Trump endorsing Ed Gallrein, "Gallrein has taken over $15 million from your PACs. Nobody in my generation wants to continue supporting Zionist boomer politicians."

In 2025, he showed support for youth members of the Cheyenne tribe affected by poverty near his hometown in South Dakota through the NFL's “My Cause, My Cleats” initiative.
