= Drew Biber =

American football player (born 2003/04)

Profile
- Position: Tight end

Personal information
- Born: 2003/2004
- Listed height: 6 ft 3 in (1.91 m)
- Listed weight: 247 lb (112 kg)

Career information
- High school: Cedarburg (Cedarburg, Wisconsin)
- College: Purdue (2021–2024); Minnesota (2025)
- NFL draft: 2026: undrafted

Career history
- Green Bay Packers (2026)*; Cleveland Browns (2026)*
- * Offseason or practice squad member only

Drew Biber (born 2003/04) is an American football tight end. He played college football for the Minnesota Golden Gophers and Purdue Boilermakers.

== Early life ==
Biber attended Cedarburg High School in Cedarburg, Wisconsin, and committed to play college football for the Northern Illinois Huskies. He later flipped his commitment to play for the Purdue Boilermakers.

== College career ==
=== Purdue ===
In four seasons at Purdue from 2021 to 2024, Biber totaled 15 receptions for 135 yards and a touchdown. After the 2024 season, he entered the NCAA transfer portal.

=== Minnesota ===
Biber transferred to play for the Minnesota Golden Gophers. During the 2025 season, he caught 18 passes for 136 yards in 13 games played.

== Professional career ==
=== Green Bay Packers ===
After going undrafted in the 2026 NFL draft, Biber signed with the Green Bay Packers as an undrafted free agent on August 4, 2026. On August 11, he was waived by the Packers.

=== Cleveland Browns ===
On August 20, 2026, Biber signed with the Cleveland Browns. On August 28, he was waived by the Browns.
