= Zaire Franklin =

American football player (born 1996)

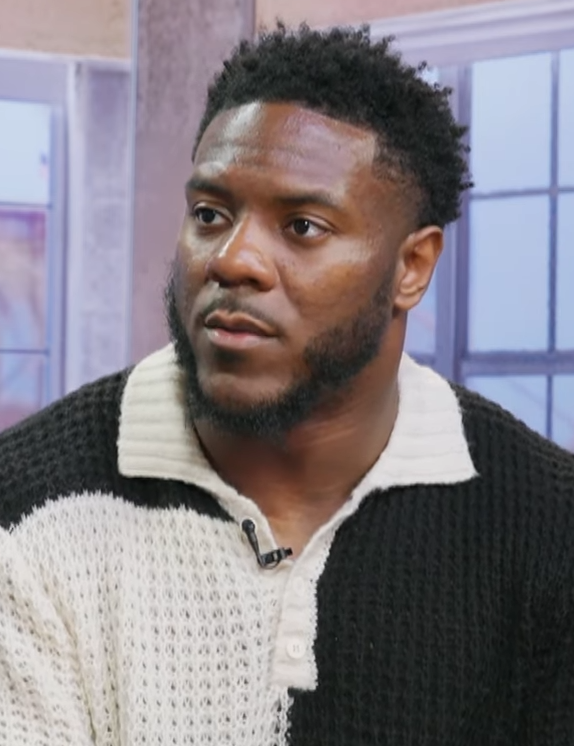
- Franklin in 2025

No. 44 – Green Bay Packers
- Position: Linebacker
- Roster status: Active

Personal information
- Born: July 2, 1996 (age 30); Philadelphia, Pennsylvania, U.S.
- Listed height: 6 ft 0 in (1.83 m)
- Listed weight: 235 lb (107 kg)

Career information
- High school: La Salle College (Wyndmoor, Pennsylvania)
- College: Syracuse (2014–2017)
- NFL draft: 2018: 7th round, 235th overall pick

Career history
- Indianapolis Colts (2018–2025); Green Bay Packers (2026–present)

Awards and highlights
- Second-team All-Pro (2024); Pro Bowl (2024); NFL combined tackles leader (2024)

Career NFL statistics as of Week 10, 2026
- Total tackles: 779
- Sacks: 10.0
- Forced fumbles: 11
- Fumble recoveries: 1
- Pass deflections: 27
- Interceptions: 3
- Stats at Pro Football Reference

Zaire Najee Franklin (born July 2, 1996) is an American professional football linebacker for the Green Bay Packers of the National Football League (NFL). He played college football for the Syracuse Orange and was selected by the Indianapolis Colts in the seventh round of the 2018 NFL Draft.

== College career ==
Franklin played linebacker for the Syracuse Orange from 2014 to 2017. While at Syracuse, Franklin recorded 311 career tackles over the course of 48 total games, starting the final 39 of his career. Franklin was a two-time All-Atlantic Coast Conference selection. Additionally, he was only the second three-time captain in Orange football history and the first since 1896.

== Professional career ==
Pre-draft measurables
Height	Weight	Arm length	Hand span	Wingspan	40-yard dash	10-yard split	20-yard split	20-yard shuttle	Three-cone drill	Vertical jump	Broad jump	Bench press
6 ft 0 1/8 in (1.83 m)	239 lb (108 kg)	31 3/4 in (0.81 m)	9 1/2 in (0.24 m)	6 ft 5 1/8 in (1.96 m)	4.62 s	1.55 s	2.65 s	4.22 s	6.97 s	38.0 in (0.97 m)	10 ft 2 in (3.10 m)	30 reps
All values from 2017 Syracuse Pro Day

=== Indianapolis Colts ===
Franklin was selected by the Indianapolis Colts in the seventh round, 235th overall, of the 2018 NFL draft. The Colts previously obtained the pick used to select Franklin by trading Henry Anderson to the New York Jets. Franklin made his NFL debut on September 9, 2018, against the Cincinnati Bengals, recording one tackle on special teams. He made his first career start at linebacker on September 23 against the Philadelphia Eagles, notching one tackle on defense and another on special teams. In his rookie season, Franklin appeared in all 16 regular season games, starting two, and recorded 29 tackles and one pass defended.

On September 8, 2020, Franklin was named one of the five team captains heading into the 2020 season. In the 2020 season, he appeared in 16 games and started two.

On March 16, 2022, Franklin signed a three-year, $12 million contract extension with the Colts. In the 2022 season, Franklin had three sacks, 167 total tackles (102 solo), six passes defended, and two forced fumbles in 17 starts.

In 2023, Franklin finished the season second in the league with a career-high 179 tackles, 1.5 sacks, two forced fumbles, and six passes defensed through 16 starts. Franklin was ranked 100th by his fellow players on the NFL Top 100 Players of 2024.

On March 11, 2024, with Franklin beginning the last year of his contract, the Colts signed him to a three-year extension worth up to $31.3 million. He played every defensive snap for Indianapolis during the 2024 season, recording two interceptions, six pass deflections, five forced fumbles, 3.5 sacks, and a league-leading 173 combined tackles. Franklin underwent a clean-up procedure on his ankle following the season.

=== Green Bay Packers ===
On March 11, 2026, Franklin was traded to the Green Bay Packers in exchange for Colby Wooden.

== NFL career statistics ==
Legend
	Led the league
**Bold**	Career high

=== Regular season ===
Year	Team	Games		Tackles						Interceptions						Fumbles	
Year	Team	GP	GS	Cmb	Solo	Ast	Sck	TfL	Sfty	PD	Int	Yds	TD	Avg	Lng	FF	FR
2018	IND	16	2	29	14	15	0.0	0	0	1	0	0	0	0.0	0	0	0
2019	IND	16	0	6	4	2	0.0	0	0	0	0	0	0	0.0	0	0	0
2020	IND	16	2	19	14	5	0.0	0	0	0	0	0	0	0	0	0	0
2021	IND	**17**	11	40	21	19	0.0	1	0	2	1	**8**	0	**8.0**	**8**	0	**1**
2022	IND	**17**	**17**	167	102	65	3.0	**12**	0	**6**	0	0	0	0	0	2	0
2023	IND	16	16	**179**	**107**	72	1.5	3	0	**6**	0	0	0	0	0	2	0
2024	IND	**17**	**17**	173	93	**80**	**3.5**	11	0	**6**	**2**	4	0	2.0	4	**5**	0
2025	IND	17	17	125	62	63	2.0	7	0	5	0	0	0	0.0	0	1	0
2026	GB	6	6	41	18	23	0.0	2	0	1	0	0	0	0.0	0	1	0
Career		138	88	779	435	344	10.0	36	0	27	3	12	0	4.0	8	11	1

=== Postseason ===
Year	Team	Games		Tackles						Interceptions						Fumbles	
Year	Team	GP	GS	Cmb	Solo	Ast	Sck	TfL	Sfty	PD	Int	Yds	TD	Avg	Lng	FF	FR
2018	IND	**2**	**2**	0	0	0	0.0	0	0	0	0	0	0	0	0	0	0
2020	IND	1	0	**1**	0	**1**	0.0	0	0	0	0	0	0	0	0	0	0
Career		3	2	1	0	1	0.0	0	0	0	0	0	0	0.0	0	0	0

== Personal life ==
Franklin was the Colts nominee for the 2023 Walter Payton Man of the Year Award for his charitable efforts in founding and leading Shelice's Angels. Shelice's Angels seeks "to open doors and provide resources that will help build self esteem while providing positive reinforcement in the lives of young women" and focuses specifically in the areas of technology, community giving, and academic achievement. On his days off from the NFL, he appears on "520 Podcast" alongside NBA Players and Indiana natives Jeff and Marquis Teague.
