= Trey Smack =

American football player (born 2003)

No. 28 – Green Bay Packers
- Position: Placekicker
- Roster status: Active

Personal information
- Born: July 12, 2003 (age 23)
- Listed height: 6 ft 1 in (1.85 m)
- Listed weight: 188 lb (85 kg)

Career information
- High school: Severna Park (Severna Park, Maryland)
- College: Florida (2022–2025)
- NFL draft: 2026: 6th round, 216th overall pick

Career history
- Green Bay Packers (2026–present)

Awards and highlights
- Third-team All-SEC (2025)

Career NFL statistics as of Week 10, 2026
- Field goals made: 15
- Field goals attempted: 21
- Field goal %: 71.4
- Longest field goal: 59
- Extra points made: 21
- Extra points attempted: 24
- Extra point %: 87.5
- Points scored: 66
- Stats at Pro Football Reference

James Woodrow "Trey" Smack III (born July 12, 2003) is an American professional football placekicker for the Green Bay Packers of the National Football League (NFL). He played college football for the Florida Gators and was selected by the Packers in the sixth round of the 2026 NFL draft.

== Early life ==
Smack played football and lacrosse at Severna Park High School in Severna Park, Maryland. He was rated the fifth-best kicker and 15th-best punter in the country by Kohl's Kicking. He chose to attend Florida over other offers from Navy, Virginia Tech, and Air Force.

== College career ==
In his freshman season in 2022, Smack primarily saw action as a kickoff specialist and played in the Las Vegas Bowl. In 2023, he beat out the first-string kicker, Adam Mihalek, to gain the starting job. He made 17 of his 21 field goal attempts and made all 29 PATs. His season-long field goal was 54 yards, which he made twice. Smack was also named a Lou Groza Award semifinalist.

Through 2024 Smack continued to serve as the starting placekicker and punter for the Gators as he remained perfect on PATs and went 18 for 21 on field goal attempts. He broke his career-long in the upset win against LSU, completing an attempt from 55 yards.

Ahead of 2025, Smack made his second appearance on the Lou Groza Award preseason watch list (after 2023). Smack broke the program record for most field goals from 50+ yards, setting the record at nine after connecting from 54 yards against Georgia. He ended the season 18 for 22 on field goal attempts and 27 for 28 on PATs. Smack was once again named a Lou Groza Award semifinalist and garnered an All-SEC third team selection.

== Professional career ==
Pre-draft measurables
Height	Weight	Arm length	Hand span	Wingspan
6 ft 1 1/4 in (1.86 m)	188 lb (85 kg)	30 in (0.76 m)	8 3/4 in (0.22 m)	6 ft 2 1/2 in (1.89 m)
All values from NFL Combine

Smack was selected by the Green Bay Packers in the sixth round (216th overall) of the 2026 NFL draft. He was signed on May 1, 2026. By the end of week 7, Smack was involved in two of the three NFL unsuccessful field goals from 35 yards or under. Head coach Matt LaFleur stated that Smack would remain the Packers placekicker following their week 7 loss to the Detroit Lions despite missing two field goals in that game.

== Statistics ==
=== NFL ===
==== Regular season ====
			Field goals					PATs			Points
Season	Team	GP	FGM	FGA	Pct	Blk	Lng	XPM	XPA	Pct	Pts
2026	GB	6	10	13	76.9	1	59	11	13	84.6	41
Career		6	10	13	76.9	1	59	11	13	84.6	41

== Personal life ==
Smack's brother, Tucker Smack, plays football for the Delaware Blue Hens. Their grandfather, James Smack I, also played for Delaware as a guard from 1961–1964.
