= Lenny Krieg =

German football player (born 2002)

Profile
- Position: Kicker

Personal information
- Born: 5 August 2002 (age 24); Berlin, Germany
- Listed height: 6 ft 1 in (1.85 m)
- Listed weight: 210 lb (95 kg)

Career history
- Berlin Adler (2022); Stuttgart Surge (2023–2024); Atlanta Falcons (2025)*; New York Jets (2026)*; Green Bay Packers (2026)*
- * Offseason or practice squad member only
- Stats at Pro Football Reference

Lenny C. Krieg (born 5 August 2002) is a German professional American football kicker. He has previously played for the Berlin Adler of the German Football League (GFL) and the Stuttgart Surge of the European League of Football (ELF) before joining the Falcons through the NFL's International Player Pathway program.

== Early life ==
Growing up in Berlin, Krieg primarily played soccer prior to his American football career. After his older brother returned from university in Wisconsin enthusing about the game, Krieg began to take interest. Initially, his brother (who would later become a football coach himself) recommended that he play defense, but Krieg was hesitant, as he had concerns as to the safety of playing collision-heavy positions. Instead, he trained as a placekicker, teaching himself how to kick an American football by watching tutorials on YouTube and Instagram.

== Professional career ==
=== Berlin Adler ===
In 2021, Krieg began his professional football career playing in the German Football League for the U19 team of the Berlin Adler, where his brother had been hired as a coach. After a successful debut in which he became North German champion of the GFL Juniors in 2021, he was promoted the senior team in 2022. He was later voted the Adler's Rookie of the Year for 2022.

=== Stuttgart Surge ===
In 2023, he moved up to the European League of Football to play for the Stuttgart Surge. In the 2023 regular season, Krieg converted eight out of ten field goal attempts, and was subsequently re-signed for the 2024 season.

In February 2025, he participated in the NFL Combine after joining the NFL's International Player Pathway program. He had a perfect performance on the field at the combine, converting all 14 field goal attempts (from 25, 30, 35, 40, 45, 50, and 55 yards respectively, each from the left and right) without a single missed kick, the only one out of the 12 kickers present to do so.

=== Atlanta Falcons ===
Following his impressive combine performance, Krieg signed a three-year contract with the Atlanta Falcons on 27 March 2025. He was waived on 26 August as a part of final roster cuts and was re-signed to the practice squad the following day.

=== New York Jets ===
On 12 January 2026, Krieg signed a reserve/future contract with the New York Jets. He was waived by the Jets on 1 June.

=== Green Bay Packers ===
On 28 July 2026, Krieg signed with the Green Bay Packers. Three days later, he was waived by the team. On 2 September, Krieg was re–signed to the Packers' practice squad. On November 17, he was released.

== Personal life ==
While playing for the Surge, Krieg had to commute six and a half hours by train every week for practices and games, while simultaneously working a real estate job to help pay for rent.

== See also ==
- List of players who have converted from one football code to another
