= Christian Watson =

American football player (born 1999)

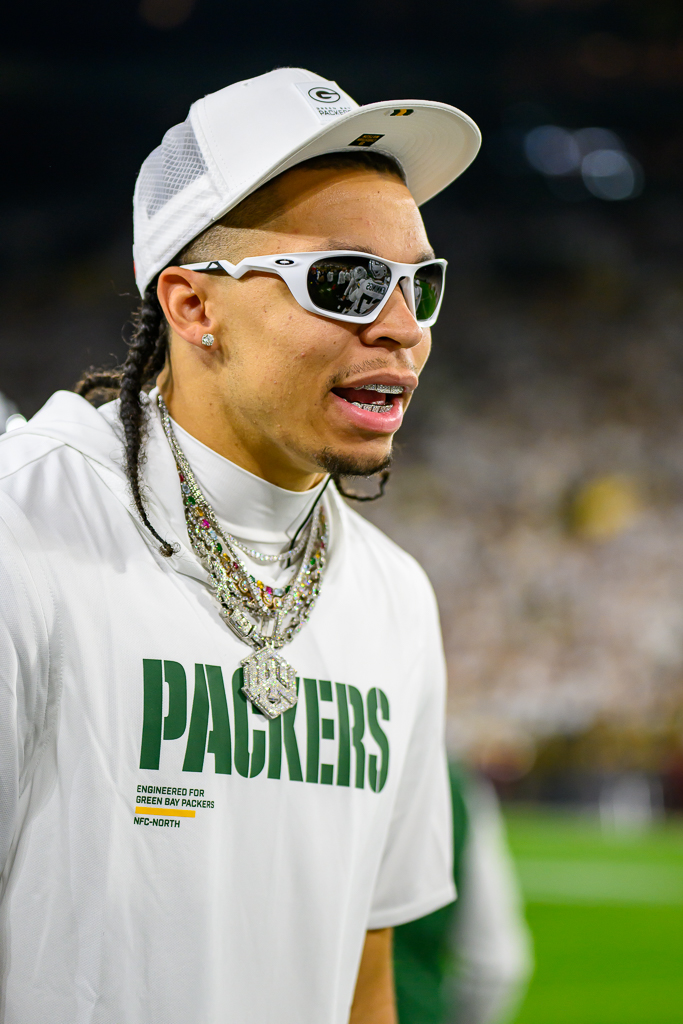
- Watson in 2025

No. 9 – Green Bay Packers
- Position: Wide receiver
- Roster status: Active

Personal information
- Born: May 12, 1999 (age 27); Phoenix, Arizona, U.S.
- Listed height: 6 ft 4 in (1.93 m)
- Listed weight: 215 lb (98 kg)

Career information
- High school: Henry B. Plant (Tampa, Florida)
- College: North Dakota State (2017–2021)
- NFL draft: 2022: 2nd round, 34th overall pick

Career history
- Green Bay Packers (2022–present)

Awards and highlights
- 4× FCS national champion (2017–2019, 2021); First-team All-American (2021); Second-team All-American (2021); 2× First-team All-MVFC (2020, 2021); Second-team All-MVFC (2019)

Career NFL statistics as of Week 10, 2026
- Receptions: 185
- Receiving yards: 3,180
- Receiving touchdowns: 27
- Rushing yards: 117
- Rushing touchdowns: 2
- Stats at Pro Football Reference

Christian Justus Watson (born May 12, 1999) is an American professional football wide receiver for the Green Bay Packers of the National Football League (NFL). He played college football for the North Dakota State Bison, and was selected by the Packers in the second round of the 2022 NFL draft.

== Early life ==
Watson was born in Phoenix, Arizona and grew up in Tampa, Florida, where he attended Henry B. Plant High School. He played for Plant's junior varsity football team for his first two years of high school. Watson began his freshman year at 5-foot-9 and ended his senior season at 6-foot-2. He gained 20 pounds between his junior and senior years. His growth allowed him to be more successful on the field, where he caught 23 passes for 393 yards and eight touchdowns as a senior.

Watson was lightly recruited coming out of high school, in large part due to a lack of playing time until his senior season. He committed to play college football at North Dakota State University entering his senior year.

=== High school statistics ===
Season	GP	Receiving				Rushing			
Season	GP	Rec	Yds	Avg	TD	Att	Yds	Avg	TD
2015	3	4	63	15.8	2	0	0	0.0	0
2016	13	23	393	17.1	8	3	53	17.7	0
Career	16	27	456	16.9	10	3	53	17.7	0
Source: maxpreps.com

== College career ==
Watson played for the North Dakota State Bison. Watson redshirted his freshman season. As a redshirt freshman the following year, he caught nine passes for 165 yards as the Bison won the 2018 FCS national championship. As a redshirt sophomore, Watson caught 34 passes for 732 yards and six touchdowns and was named second-team All-Missouri Valley Football Conference (MVFC).

He had 19 catches for 442 yards and one touchdown and was named first-team All-MVFC and 1st team All-American (AP) as an All-Purpose player in his redshirt junior season, which was shortened and played in early 2021 due to the COVID-19 pandemic. He repeated as a first-team All-MVFC selection, and was named second-team All-American(AP) after catching 43 passes for 801 yards and seven touchdowns in his redshirt senior season. Watson and the Bison won the 2021 FCS national championship, beating Montana State 38–10. He missed almost the entire postseason in his senior season. Watson also played in the 2022 Senior Bowl where he was voted National WR of the Week.

=== College statistics ===
Year	Team	GP	Receiving				Rushing			
Year	Team	GP	Rec	Yds	Avg	TD	Att	Yds	Avg	TD
2017	North Dakota State	Redshirt								
2018	North Dakota State	14	9	165	18.3	0	0	0	0.0	0
2019	North Dakota State	16	34	732	21.5	6	13	162	12.5	1
2020	North Dakota State	10	19	442	23.3	1	21	116	5.5	0
2021	North Dakota State	12	43	801	18.6	7	15	114	7.6	1
Career		52	105	2,140	20.4	14	49	392	8.0	2
Source: gobison.com

== Professional career ==
Pre-draft measurables
Height	Weight	Arm length	Hand span	Wingspan	40-yard dash	10-yard split	20-yard split	20-yard shuttle	Three-cone drill	Vertical jump	Broad jump	Bench press	Wonderlic
6 ft 4 1/8 in (1.93 m)	208 lb (94 kg)	32 1/2 in (0.83 m)	10 1/8 in (0.26 m)	6 ft 6 5/8 in (2.00 m)	4.36 s	1.46 s	2.45 s	4.19 s	6.96 s	38.5 in (0.98 m)	11 ft 4 in (3.45 m)	18 reps	38
All values from NFL Combine/Pro Day

=== 2022 ===
Watson was selected as the second pick of the second round (34th overall) in the 2022 NFL draft by the Green Bay Packers. He was the seventh wide receiver selected in the draft. Watson was the only wide receiver from North Dakota State University to be drafted in the past thirty-seven years. On July 20, 2022, he signed his rookie contract, a four-year deal with the Packers worth $9,241,031.

During the offseason, Watson suffered a minor knee injury that required him to undergo knee surgery which caused him to miss the majority of training camp.

Watson made his NFL debut in a Week 1 game against the Minnesota Vikings. On his first snap, Watson beat former All-Pro cornerback Patrick Peterson on his route, but dropped what would have been a 75-yard touchdown pass from Aaron Rodgers. After the dropped pass, Rodgers did not look toward Watson until the end of the fourth quarter. He finished the game with two receptions for 32 yards, and rushing once for an additional seven in the 23–7 loss. In Week 4, against the New England Patriots, Watson scored his first NFL touchdown on a 15-yard rush.

During Week 8, in the first quarter against the Buffalo Bills, Watson suffered from a concussion. Watson caught a 12-yard pass during their first offensive possession, and he received a hard hit to the head. He was able to walk off the field and was ruled out for the rest of the game.

In Week 10 against the Dallas Cowboys, Watson had a breakout performance, catching four passes for 107 yards and three touchdowns in the 31–28 overtime win. After multiple drops on the opening drive, Watson scored the Packers' longest and second longest touchdowns of the season, a 58-yard score from Rodgers in the second quarter, and a 39-yard touchdown in the 4th quarter. He also scored a 7-yard touchdown in the 4th quarter to tie the game near the end of regulation. For this performance, Watson won NFL Week 10 Rookie of the Week. In the following game against the Tennessee Titans, Watson had 4 catches for 48 yards and two receiving touchdowns in the 27–17 loss. 10 days later, on Sunday Night Football against the Philadelphia Eagles, Watson caught 4 passes for 110 yards and a touchdown, including a 63-yarder from backup quarterback Jordan Love that he caught at midfield and took to the house. For his performance in the month of November, Watson was awarded Rookie of the Month.

In Week 13 against the Bears, Watson had 3 receptions for 48 yards and a touchdown, and rushed for a 46-yard touchdown to extend the Packers' lead to seven late in the game. With his eighth touchdown in four games, Watson matched Pro Football Hall of Famer Randy Moss's rookie record for most touchdowns in a four-game span.

Watson finished his rookie year with 41 receptions for 611 yards and seven receiving touchdowns, as well as two rushing touchdowns. Watson tied with Jahan Dotson for the most receiving and with Kenneth Walker III for most total touchdowns among all rookies.

=== 2023 ===
While having perfect attendance during training camp, Watson started off the 2023 season with a hamstring injury, causing him to miss practice. He was subsequently marked inactive for the first three games. Watson would be marked active for Week 4, against the Detroit Lions. In his season debut, he had two receptions for 25 yards and a touchdown during the 34–20 loss. In Week 13, against the Chiefs, he had two receiving touchdowns in the 27–19 victory. Week 13 was Watson's last action during the 2023 regular season due to lingering hamstring issues. He finished with 28 receptions for 422 yards and five touchdowns. He returned for the Packers' two postseason games.

=== 2024 ===
In a Week 18 matchup against the Chicago Bears, Watson suffered a non contact injury in his right knee while running a route and was carted off the field during the game. It was revealed on January 6, 2025, that Watson had torn his ACL. He was subsequently ruled out for the remainder of the season following the announcement. Watson ended his season having started 15 games with 29 receptions, 620 receiving yards, and two touchdowns.

=== 2025 ===
On July 18, 2025, Watson was placed on the PUP list as he continued to recover from the ACL injury he suffered the prior season. On September 10, the Packers signed Watson to a one-year, $13.25 million extension. He was activated for his season debut on October 25, ahead of Green Bay's Week 8 matchup against the Pittsburgh Steelers. He finished the 2025 season with 35 receptions for 611 yards and six touchdowns. He had a receiving touchdown in the 31–27 loss to the Bears in the Wild Card Round.

=== 2026 ===
On June 4, 2026, Watson signed a four-year, $110.5 million extension with the Packers.

Watson had an explosive start to the season. In the opening week of the regular season, Watson caught a career-long 81-yard touchdown reception, catching six receptions for 147 yards and two touchdowns in the 39–22 loss to the Minnesota Vikings. He then had another performance similarly to his season opening performance, this time against the Chicago Bears in Week 5, catching six receptions for 143 yards and two touchdowns in the 31–7 win. Watson caught eight receptions for 113 yards despite losing a fumble in the 27–19 win. During that game, he caught a 53-yard catch over Will Lee III before getting tackled and hurting his rib in the process. He had to leave the game to go to the hospital before returning to the field in a standing ovation during the second half. The next week, in a game against the New England Patriots, he caught seven receptions for 171 receiving yards and a touchdown in the 45–27 win. His teammate, Matthew Golden, caught ten receptions for 164 receiving yards and a touchdown, making the wide receiver duo become the first wide receiver duo in Packers history to have 150+ receiving yards and 1+ touchdown in a game since Don Hutson and Andy Uram in 1942. However, during that game, when Watson caught a 39-yard touchdown in the third quarter, he and Golden did a "double-backflip celebration", in which both him and his teammate did a backflip together. This resulted in head coach Matt LaFleur issuing a warning to them to never do that again, citing injury concerns.

== NFL career statistics ==
=== Regular season ===
Legend
**Bold**	Career high

Year	Team	Games		Receiving					Rushing					Fumbles	
Year	Team	GP	GS	Rec	Yds	Avg	Lng	TD	Att	Yds	Avg	Lng	TD	Fum	Lost
2022	GB	14	11	41	611	14.9	63T	**7**	**7**	**80**	**11.4**	**46T**	**2**	0	0
2023	GB	9	9	28	422	15.1	77	5	4	11	2.8	13	0	0	0
2024	GB	15	15	29	620	**21.4**	60	2	4	23	5.8	14	0	**1**	**1**
2025	GB	10	10	35	611	17.5	52	6	1	3	3.0	3	0	0	0
2026	GB	10	10	**52**	**916**	17.6	**81T**	**7**	0	0	0	0	0	**1**	**1**
Career		58	55	185	3,180	17.2	81T	27	16	117	5.7	46T	2	2	2
Source: pro-football-reference.com

=== Postseason ===
Year	Team	Games		Receiving					Fumbles	
Year	Team	GP	GS	Rec	Yds	Avg	Lng	TD	Fum	Lost
2023	GB	**2**	0	2	20	10.0	11	0	0	0
2025	GB	1	1	**3**	**36**	**12.0**	**22**	**1**	0	0
Career		3	1	5	56	11.2	22	0	0	0
Source: pro-football-reference.com

== Personal life ==
Watson is a Christian. He has said, "It's a tough sport, a lot on the body, but I'm just grateful for where I'm at regardless of the situation, appreciative of that. I always kind of fall back on that, embracing God's plan."

Watson married his college sweetheart, Lakyn Adkins, on April 5, 2024. They have one son together.

Watson's father, Tim Watson, played safety in the NFL during the 1990s for the Packers, Eagles, Chiefs, and Giants. He was a sixth round selection of the Packers in the 1993 NFL draft. His father now goes by Tazim Wajid Wajed.

Watson has four siblings, a brother and three sisters. Watson's older brother, Tre Watson, played linebacker at Maryland and Illinois and was an All-Big Ten selection. He currently plays in the XFL (now the UFL).
