= Chris McClellan (American football) =

American football player (born 2003)

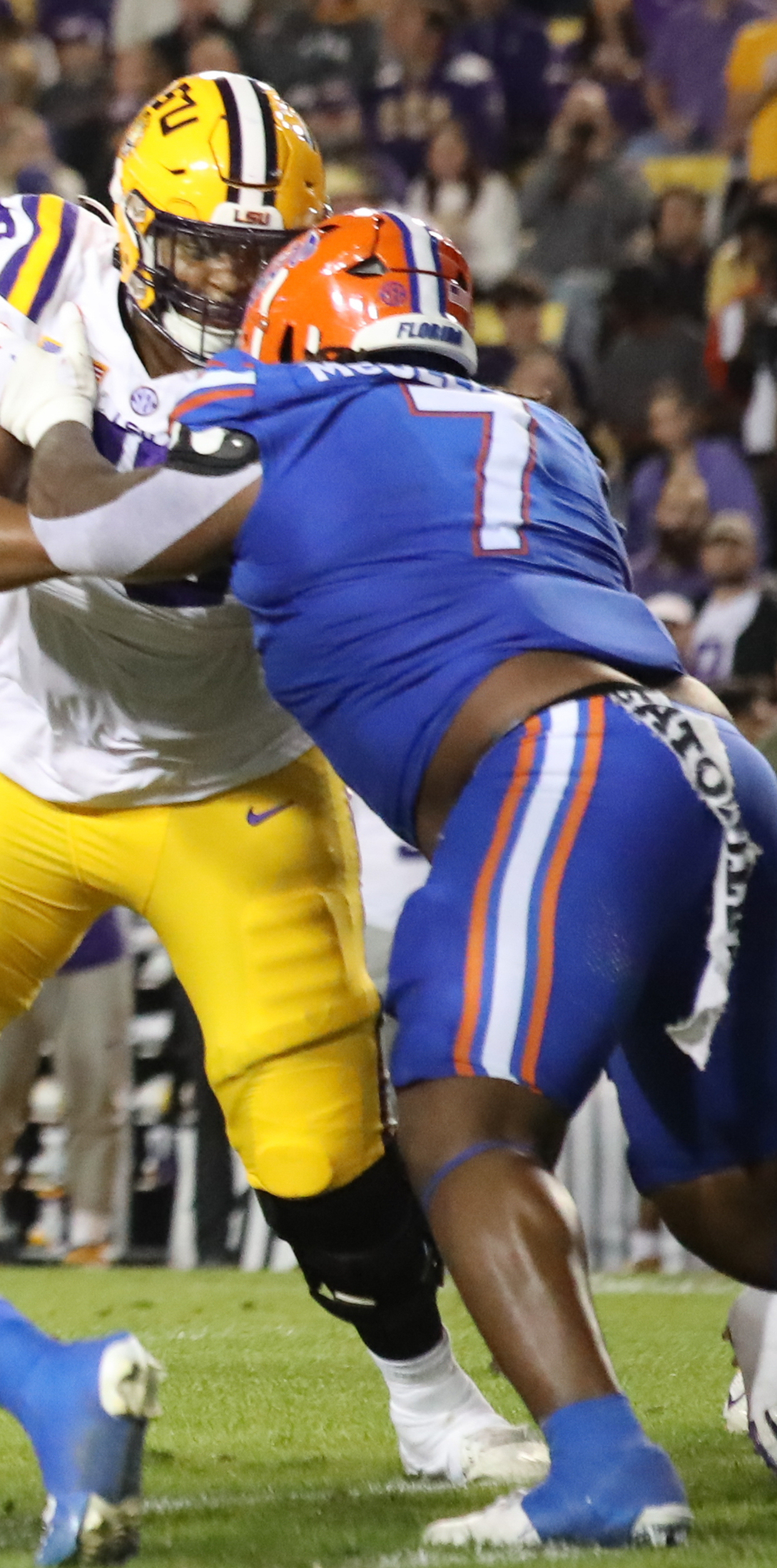
- McClellan with the Florida Gators in 2023

No. 55 – Green Bay Packers
- Position: Defensive tackle
- Roster status: Active

Personal information
- Born: October 17, 2003 (age 23); Tulsa, Oklahoma, U.S.
- Listed height: 6 ft 3 in (1.91 m)
- Listed weight: 313 lb (142 kg)

Career information
- High school: Owasso (Owasso, Oklahoma)
- College: Florida (2022–2023); Missouri (2024–2025)
- NFL draft: 2026: 3rd round, 77th overall pick

Career history
- Green Bay Packers (2026–present)

Awards and highlights
- Second-team All-SEC (2025)

Career NFL statistics as of Week 10, 2026
- Total tackles: 19
- Stats at Pro Football Reference

Christopher McClellan (born October 17, 2003) is an American professional football defensive tackle for the Green Bay Packers of the National Football League (NFL). He played college football for the Florida Gators and Missouri Tigers and was selected by the Packers in the third round of the 2026 NFL draft.

== Early life ==
McClellan attended high school at Edison Preparatory School for his first three seasons, before transferring to Owasso High School located in Owasso, Oklahoma. Coming out of high school, he was rated as a four star recruit, where he held offers from schools such as Alabama, Florida, Ohio State, Oklahoma, Ohio State, Texas, and USC. Ultimately, McClellan committed to play college football for the Florida Gators.

== College career ==
=== Florida ===
He finished his freshman season in 2022, playing in all 13 games, where he racked up 23 tackles with two and a half being for a loss, a sack and a half, and a fumble recovery. During the 2023 season, McClellan appeared in all 13 games with one starts, where he notched 23 tackles with one going for a loss, and a half a sack. After the conclusion of the 2023 season, he decided to enter his name into the NCAA transfer portal.

=== Missouri ===
McClellan transferred to play for the Missouri Tigers. In week four of the 2024 season, McClellan notched a career-high seven tackles in a double-overtime victory versus Vanderbilt. He finished his first season with the team in 2024, appearing in all 13 games, with nine starts, totaling 39 tackles with six being for a loss, two and a half sacks, two pass deflections, and a forced fumble. Heading into the 2025 season, he was projected to a be an NFL draft prospect.

On December 1, 2025, McClellan was named SEC Defensive Lineman of the Week after his career-high two sack performance in a win against Arkansas in the final week of the 2025 regular season.

== Professional career ==
Pre-draft measurables
Height	Weight	Arm length	Hand span	Wingspan	40-yard dash	10-yard split	20-yard split	20-yard shuttle	Three-cone drill	Vertical jump	Broad jump	Bench press
6 ft 3 3/4 in (1.92 m)	313 lb (142 kg)	34 in (0.86 m)	11 in (0.28 m)	6 ft 11 1/4 in (2.11 m)	5.05 s	1.80 s	2.94 s	5.00 s	8.18 s	29.5 in (0.75 m)	9 ft 0 in (2.74 m)	25 reps
All values from NFL Combine/Pro Day

McClellan was selected by the Green Bay Packers in the third round with the 77th overall pick of the 2026 NFL draft. He was signed on May 1, 2026.
