= Colby Wooden =

American football player (born 2000)

No. 50 – New Orleans Saints
- Position: Defensive tackle
- Roster status: Active

Personal information
- Born: December 21, 2000 (age 25); New Orleans, Louisiana, U.S.
- Listed height: 6 ft 4 in (1.93 m)
- Listed weight: 273 lb (124 kg)

Career information
- High school: Archer (Lawrenceville, Georgia)
- College: Auburn (2019–2022)
- NFL draft: 2023: 4th round, 116th overall pick

Career history
- Green Bay Packers (2023–2025); Indianapolis Colts (2026)*; New Orleans Saints (2026–present)
- * Offseason or practice squad member only

Career NFL statistics as of Week 10, 2026
- Total tackles: 110
- Sacks: 2.5
- Pass deflections: 3
- Forced fumbles: 1
- Stats at Pro Football Reference

Colby Wooden (born December 21, 2000) is an American professional football defensive tackle for the New Orleans Saints of the National Football League (NFL). He played college football for the Auburn Tigers.

== Early life ==
Wooden grew up in Lawrenceville, Georgia and attended Archer High School. As a senior, he was named the GHSA Region 8-AAAAA Defensive Player of the Year by The Atlanta Journal-Constitution. Wooden was rated a three-star recruit and committed to play college football at Auburn University over an offer from Clemson.

== College career ==
Wooden missed much of his freshman season after contracting mononucleosis. Overall, he played in three games and made four tackles. Wooden finished his redshirt freshman season with 42 tackles, 9.5 for loss, and four sacks. As a redshirt sophomore, he made 61 tackles with 8.5 tackles for a loss and five sacks. Wooden considered entering the 2022 NFL draft, but opted to return to Auburn for his redshirt junior season.

== Professional career ==
Pre-draft measurables
Height	Weight	Arm length	Hand span	Wingspan	40-yard dash	10-yard split	20-yard split	20-yard shuttle	Three-cone drill	Broad jump	Bench press
6 ft 4 in (1.93 m)	273 lb (124 kg)	33 3/4 in (0.86 m)	10 3/8 in (0.26 m)	6 ft 8 3/8 in (2.04 m)	4.79 s	1.68 s	2.77 s	4.43 s	7.49 s	9 ft 7 in (2.92 m)	23 reps
All values from NFL Combine/Pro Day

=== Green Bay Packers ===
Wooden was selected in the fourth round, 116th overall, by the Green Bay Packers in the 2023 NFL draft. He signed his rookie contract on May 5.

=== Indianapolis Colts ===
On March 11, 2026, Wooden was traded to the Indianapolis Colts in exchange for Zaire Franklin. He was waived by Indianapolis as a part of final roster cuts on August 30.

=== New Orleans Saints ===
On August 31, 2026, the New Orleans Saints claimed Wooden off of waivers.

== NFL career statistics ==
Legend
**Bold**	Career high

=== Regular season ===
Year	Team	Games		Tackles						Fumbles			
Year	Team	GP	GS	Cmb	Solo	Ast	Sck	TFL	PD	FF	FR	Yds	TD
2023	GB	17	0	17	10	7	**0.5**	1	0	0	0	0	0
2024	GB	13	1	20	9	11	0.0	2	**2**	0	0	0	0
2025	GB	17	16	**50**	**26**	**24**	0.0	**6**	1	0	0	0	0
2026	NOR	9	3	23	8	15	2.0	5	0	1	0	0	0
Career		56	20	110	53	57	2.5	14	3	1	0	0	0
Source: pro-football-reference.com

=== Postseason ===
Year	Team	Games		Tackles						Fumbles			
Year	Team	GP	GS	Cmb	Solo	Ast	Sck	TFL	PD	FF	FR	Yds	TD
2023	GB	2	0	**3**	**1**	**2**	0.0	0	0	0	0	0	0
2024	GB	1	0	2	0	**2**	**0.5**	0	0	0	0	0	0
2025	GB	1	1	2	**1**	1	0.0	0	0	0	0	0	0
Career		4	1	7	2	5	0.5	0	0	0	0	0	0
Source: pro-football-reference.com
