= Savion Williams =

American football player (born 2001)

No. 83 – Green Bay Packers
- Position: Wide receiver
- Roster status: Active

Personal information
- Born: November 22, 2001 (age 24); Marshall, Texas, U.S.
- Listed height: 6 ft 4 in (1.93 m)
- Listed weight: 222 lb (101 kg)

Career information
- High school: Marshall (TX)
- College: TCU (2020–2024)
- NFL draft: 2025: 3rd round, 87th overall pick

Career history
- Green Bay Packers (2025–present)

Career NFL statistics as of Week 10, 2026
- Receptions: 23
- Receiving yards: 214
- Receiving touchdowns: 2
- Rushing yards: 81
- Return yards: 739
- Stats at Pro Football Reference

Savion Williams (born November 22, 2001) is an American professional football wide receiver for the Green Bay Packers of the National Football League (NFL). He played college football for the TCU Horned Frogs and was selected by the Packers in the third round of the 2025 NFL draft.

== Early life ==
Williams was born in Marshall, Texas, and attended Marshall High School. He played quarterback his senior year in 2019, throwing for 1,053 yards with eight touchdowns and one interception and added 541 rushing yards and nine touchdowns. He originally committed play college football at the University of Arkansas before changing to Texas Christian University (TCU).

== College career ==
As a true freshman at TCU in 2020, Williams played in seven games mostly as the team's kick returner. As a sophomore in 2021, he played in six games and had seven receptions for 71 yards. As a junior in 2022, he started all 15 games, recording 29 receptions for 392 yards with four touchdowns. As a senior in 2023, Williams led the team with 573 yards on 41 receptions and four touchdowns over 11 starts. He returned to TCU for his final season of eligibility in 2024.

== Professional career ==
Pre-draft measurables
| Height | Weight | Arm length | Hand span | Wingspan | 40-yard dash | 10-yard split | 20-yard split |
|---|---|---|---|---|---|---|---|
| 6 ft 3 7/8 in (1.93 m) | 220 lb (100 kg) | 32 1/2 in (0.83 m) | 10 1/4 in (0.26 m) | 6 ft 8 7/8 in (2.05 m) | 4.48 s | 1.52 s | 2.63 s |
All values from NFL Combine

Williams was selected by the Green Bay Packers with the 87th overall pick in the third round of the 2025 NFL draft. On May 2, 2025, he signed his rookie contract with the Packers. Williams made 12 appearances for Green Bay, recording 10 receptions for 78 yards and one touchdown, as well as 11 rushes for 37 yards. On January 3, 2026, Williams was placed on season-ending injured reserve due to a foot injury.

Williams began the 2026 season on injured reserve with an ankle injury. He was activated on October 17, 2026.

== Career statistics ==
=== NFL ===
==== Regular season ====
NFL regular season statistics
| Year | Team | Games | | Receiving | | | | | Rushing | | | | | Fumbles | |
| Year | Team | GP | GS | Rec | Yds | Avg | Lng | TD | Att | Yds | Avg | Lng | TD | Fum | Lost |
|---|---|---|---|---|---|---|---|---|---|---|---|---|---|---|---|
| 2025 | GB | 12 | 0 | 10 | 78 | 7.8 | 33 | 1 | 11 | 37 | 3.4 | 16 | 0 | 1 | 1 |
| Career | | 12 | 0 | 10 | 78 | 7.8 | 33 | 1 | 11 | 37 | 3.4 | 16 | 0 | 1 | 1 |
Source: pro-football-reference.com
