= Corinth High School =

Corinth High School may refer to:

- Corinth High School (New York) in Corinth, New York
- Corinth High School in Corinth, Mississippi, part of the Corinth School District
- Corinth Holders High School in Wendell, North Carolina
- South Corinth High School, formerly Eason High School, a former school established for African Americans in Corinth, Mississippi
- Central High School in Corinth, Maine
