= Jacob Monk =

American football player (born 2001)

No. 62 – Green Bay Packers
- Position: Guard
- Roster status: Injured reserve

Personal information
- Born: June 4, 2001 (age 25); Raleigh, North Carolina, U.S.
- Listed height: 6 ft 3 in (1.91 m)
- Listed weight: 308 lb (140 kg)

Career information
- High school: Corinth Holders (Archer Lodge, North Carolina)
- College: Duke (2019–2023)
- NFL draft: 2024: 5th round, 163rd overall pick

Career history
- Green Bay Packers (2024–present)

Awards and highlights
- Second-team All-ACC (2023)

Career NFL statistics as of 2026
- Games played: 21
- Games started: 4
- Stats at Pro Football Reference

Jacob Elijah Monk (born June 4, 2001) is an American professional football guard for the Green Bay Packers of the National Football League (NFL). He played college football for the Duke Blue Devils.

== Early life ==
The son of Stanley and Chareen Monk, Jacob Monk grew up in Clayton, North Carolina, a suburb of Raleigh.

Monk has been involved in working with individuals with special needs in North Carolina, particularly because his older brother, Miles, has Down syndrome, which Monk cites as formative in developing compassion for others in himself.

Monk was a four-star prospect coming out of Corinth Holders High School.

== College career ==
He played five years of college football for the Duke Blue Devils. Monk's father, Stanley, played running back for Duke from 1984 to 1987. His uncle, Quincy Monk, played linebacker in the NFL for the New York Giants and Houston Texans from 2002 to 2004.

At Duke, Monk primarily played right guard, but also took snaps as a right tackle, center and left guard in more than 50 games for the Blue Devils. Monk was named All-ACC thrice. As a senior, he was team captain.

It was during college that Monk learned he had an incredibly rare albeit mild allergy: cold urticaria, which is an allergy to cold water. For Monk, this manifests as breaking out in hives after being submerged in an ice bath.

== Professional career ==
Pre-draft measurables
Height	Weight	Arm length	Hand span	Wingspan	40-yard dash	10-yard split	20-yard split	Vertical jump	Broad jump	Bench press
6 ft 3 in (1.91 m)	308 lb (140 kg)	32 3/8 in (0.82 m)	10 in (0.25 m)	6 ft 7 in (2.01 m)	5.09 s	1.66 s	2.93 s	29.5 in (0.75 m)	9 ft 0 in (2.74 m)	31 reps
All values from NFL Combine/Pro Day

Monk was selected in the fifth round (163rd overall) of the 2024 NFL draft by the Green Bay Packers. In doing so, Monk became the first student-athlete from Corinth Holders High School to be selected in the NFL Draft. On May 14, he signed his contract with the Packers. In August 2025, he was placed on injured reserve/designated for return, and activated before Week 7.
