= Corinth Holders High School =

American public school in North Carolina

Location
- 6875 Applewhite Road; Wendell, North Carolina 27951; United States; 35°43′32″N 78°20′17″W

Information
- Other names: CHHS, Corinth
- School type: Public
- Religious affiliation: Non-denominational
- Established: 2010 (16 years ago)
- CEEB code: 344082
- Principal: Sarah Reynolds
- Teaching staff: 94.24 (on an FTE basis)
- Grades: 9–12
- Enrollment: 2,187 (2024-2025)
- Student to teacher ratio: 23.21
- Colors: Purple and gold
- Athletics: NCHSAA 8A
- Athletics conference: CAP 8A
- Mascot: Pirates
- Feeder schools: Archer Lodge Middle, North Johnston Middle, Riverwood Middle, Selma Middle
- Website: www.johnston.k12.nc.us/chhs

Corinth Holders High School is a high school in Wendell, North Carolina. It opened in the fall of 2010. It is a part of Johnston County School District. It serves students in Archer Lodge, Clayton, Zebulon and Wendell.

== Sports ==
Corinth Holders is a member of the North Carolina High School Athletic Association (NCHSAA) and is classified as an 8A school. The school is a part of the CAP 8A Conference.

Sports offered to students include basketball, cross country, golf, indoor track and field, lacrosse, swimming, soccer, tennis, track and field, and wrestling. Boy's sports include football and baseball, while girl's sports include softball, stunt, cheerleading, and gymnastics.

== Fine Arts ==
Corinth Holders Bands and Ensembles is home to some of the top ensembles in the local area. The marching band has a series of local successes, including Grand Champions at competitions held at Scotland High School (2019), John A. Holmes High School (2021), and Havelock High School (2022). They won third place at the 62nd Cary Band Day, the largest competition in North Carolina, and also had the highest color guard score of the day. The school's winter programs compete locally in the Atlantic Indoor Association, the Carolina Winter Ensembles Association, and internationally in Winter Guard International. The percussion ensemble won third place in Scholastic Concert Open in 2015 and the winds group won the gold medal in Scholastic A in 2022.

== Notable alumni ==
- Jacob Monk, NFL center for the Green Bay Packers
