= Corinth High School (New York) =

High school in New York

Coordinates: 43.2429°N 73.8274°W

Corinth High School is a school in Corinth, New York in the Adirondacks. The school is part of the Corinth Central School District.

== Mascot ==
Riverhawks are the school mascot. The mascot was a tomahawk prior to 2022.

== Address and principal ==
It is at 105 Oak Street. Eric Schenone is the school's principal. In 2024 96 percent of the students were special ed

== Students ==
It has about 340 students in grades 9–12.

== Sports ==
The school competes in the Adirondack League.

The school's football team competes in the Class C North Division.
