= Green Bay Packers =

NFL team in Green Bay, Wisconsin

- Current season
Logo	Wordmark
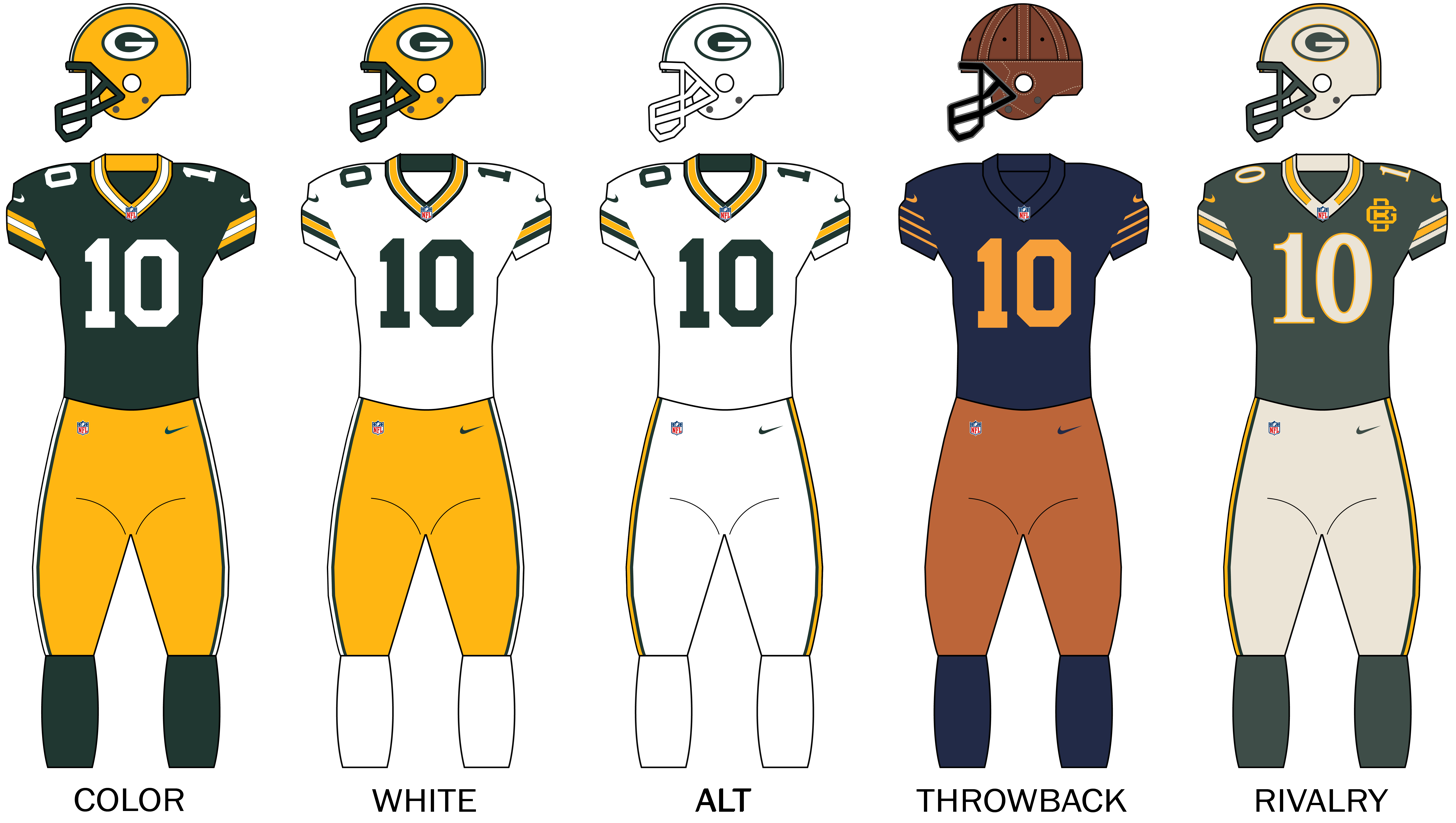
- Uniforms

General information
- Founded: August 11, 1919; 107 years ago
- Stadium: Lambeau Field; Green Bay, Wisconsin
- Headquartered: Lambeau Field; Green Bay, Wisconsin
- Colors: Dark green, gold, white
- Fight song: "Go! You Packers Go!"
- Website: packers.com

Personnel
- Owner: Green Bay Packers, Inc. (Note: 538,967 stockholders governed by a Board of Directors)
- CEO: Ed Policy
- General manager: Brian Gutekunst
- Head coach: Matt LaFleur
- President: Ed Policy

Nicknames
- Indian Packers (1919–1920); Acme Packers (1921); Blues (1922); Big Bay Blues (1920s); Bays (1918–1940s); The Pack (current); The Green and Gold (current)

Team history
- Green Bay Packers (1919–present)

Home fields
- Hagemeister Park (1919–1922); Bellevue Park (1923–1924); City Stadium (1925–1956); Borchert Field (1933); Wisconsin State Fair Park (1934–1951); Marquette Stadium (1952); Milwaukee County Stadium (1953–1994); Lambeau Field (1957–present)

League / conference affiliations
- Independent (1919–1920) National Football League (1921–present): Western Division (1933–1949); National Conference (1950–1952); Western Conference (1953–1969); Central Division (1967–1969); National Football Conference (1970–present); Central Division (1970–2001); North Division (2002–present)

Championships
- League championships: 13†: NFL championships (pre-1970 AFL–NFL merger) (11) 1929, 1930, 1931, 1936, 1939, 1944, 1961, 1962, 1965, 1966, 1967; Super Bowl championships: 4 1966 (I), 1967 (II), 1996 (XXXI), 2010 (XLV); † – Does not include 1966 and 1967 NFL championships won during the same season that the Super Bowl was contested
- Conference championships: 9: NFL Western: 1960, 1961, 1962, 1965, 1966, 1967; NFC: 1996, 1997, 2010
- Division championships: 21: NFL West: 1936, 1938, 1939, 1944; NFL Central: 1967; NFC Central: 1972, 1995, 1996, 1997; NFC North: 2002, 2003, 2004, 2007, 2011, 2012, 2013, 2014, 2016, 2019, 2020, 2021

Playoff appearances (38)
- NFL: 1936, 1938, 1939, 1941, 1944, 1960, 1961, 1962, 1965, 1966, 1967, 1972, 1982, 1993, 1994, 1995, 1996, 1997, 1998, 2001, 2002, 2003, 2004, 2007, 2009, 2010, 2011, 2012, 2013, 2014, 2015, 2016, 2019, 2020, 2021, 2023, 2024, 2025

Owner
- Green Bay Packers, Inc. (1923–present)

The Green Bay Packers are a professional American football team based in Green Bay, Wisconsin. The Packers compete in the National Football League (NFL) as a member of the National Football Conference (NFC) North division. They are the third-oldest franchise in the NFL, established in 1919, and are the only non-profit, community-owned major league professional sports team based in the United States. (Note: Two of the nine teams of the Canadian Football League, which is sometimes considered a major sports league in North America (all current CFL teams are based in Canada), exist with various forms of community ownership. The Winnipeg Blue Bombers are owned by a nonprofit corporation. The Saskatchewan Roughriders employ a similar ownership structure as the Packers; they have offered shares of the team periodically. The Roughriders' home market of Regina would also be the smallest market rather than Green Bay.) Since 1957, home games have been played at Lambeau Field. They hold the record for the most wins and championships in NFL history.

The Packers are the last of the "small-town teams" that were common in the NFL during the league's early days of the 1920s and 1930s. Founded in 1919 by Earl "Curly" Lambeau and George Whitney Calhoun, the franchise traces its lineage to other semi-professional teams in Green Bay dating back to 1896. Between 1919 and 1920, the Packers competed against other semi-pro clubs from around Wisconsin and the Midwest, before joining the American Professional Football Association (APFA), the forerunner of today's NFL, in 1921. In 1933, the Packers began playing part of their home slate in Milwaukee until changes at Lambeau Field in 1995 made it more lucrative to stay in Green Bay full-time; Milwaukee is still considered a home media market for the team. Although Green Bay is the smallest major league professional sports market in North America, Forbes ranked the Packers as the world's 23rd-most-valuable sports franchise in 2025, with a value of $6.65 billion.

The Packers have won 13 league championships, with nine pre-Super Bowl NFL titles and four Super Bowl victories. The Packers, under coach Vince Lombardi, won the first two Super Bowls in 1966 and 1967; they were the only NFL team to defeat the American Football League (AFL) before the AFL–NFL merger. After Lombardi died, the Super Bowl trophy was named for him, but the team struggled through the 1970s and 1980s. The team's performance shifted after acquiring Brett Favre in 1992 and his eventual successor Aaron Rodgers in 2005, beginning a new ongoing era which has been characterized by consistent regular-season success, with 25 playoff appearances and two Super Bowl wins in 1996 and 2010, under head coaches Mike Holmgren and Mike McCarthy, respectively. In addition to the most wins, the Packers hold the second-highest win–loss record (.571) in NFL history, including both regular season and playoff games. The Packers are longstanding adversaries of the Chicago Bears, Minnesota Vikings, and Detroit Lions, who today form the NFL's NFC North division (formerly known as the NFC Central Division). They have played more than 100 games against each of those teams and have a winning overall record against all of them, a distinction only shared with the Kansas City Chiefs, Dallas Cowboys, and Miami Dolphins. The Bears–Packers rivalry is one of the oldest rivalries in American professional sports history, dating to 1921.

== History ==
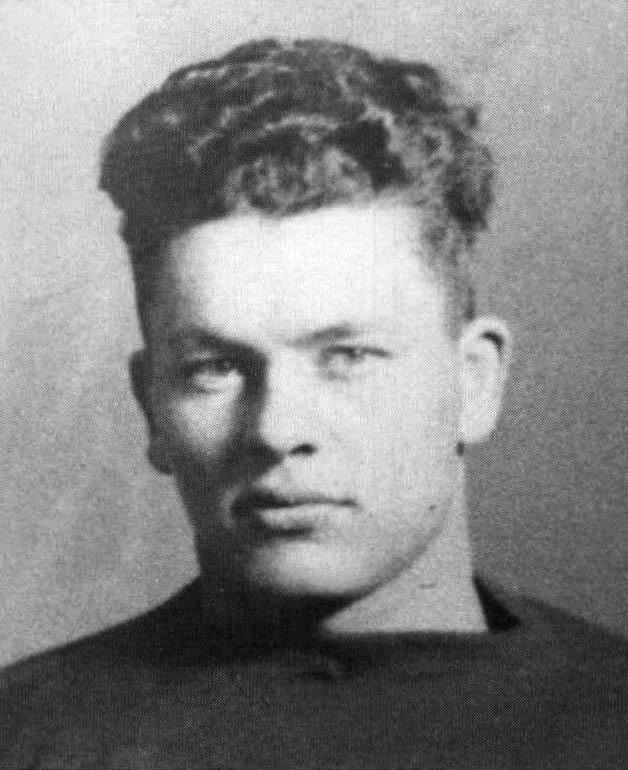
Curly Lambeau, founder, player and first coach of the Packers

=== Curly Lambeau years (1919–1949) ===
The Green Bay Packers were founded on August 11, 1919, by former high-school football rivals Earl "Curly" Lambeau and George Whitney Calhoun. Lambeau solicited funds for uniforms from his employer, the Indian Packing Company, a meat packing company. He was given $500 ($9,300 today) for uniforms and equipment, on the condition that the team be named after its sponsor. The Green Bay Packers have played in their original city longer than any other team in the NFL.

On August 27, 1921, the Packers were granted a franchise in the American Professional Football Association, a new national pro football league that had been formed the previous year. The APFA changed its name to the National Football League a year later. Financial troubles plagued the team, and the franchise was forfeited within the year before Lambeau found new financial backers and regained the franchise the next year. These backers, known as "The Hungry Five", formed the Green Bay Football Corporation.

==== NFL champions (1929, 1930, 1931) ====
After a near-miss in 1927, Lambeau's squad claimed the Packers' first NFL title in 1929 with an undefeated 12–0–1 campaign, behind a stifling defense which registered eight shutouts. Green Bay would repeat as league champions in 1930 and 1931, bettering teams from New York, Chicago and throughout the league, with all-time greats and future Hall of Famers Mike Michalske, Johnny Blood, Cal Hubbard and Green Bay native Arnie Herber. Among the many impressive accomplishments of these years was the Packers' streak of 29 consecutive home games without defeat, an NFL record which still stands.

==== NFL champions (1936, 1939, 1944) ====
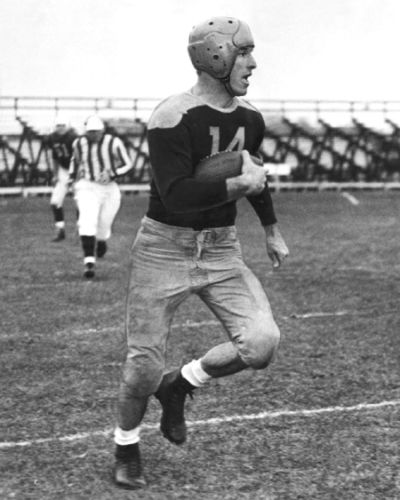
Don Hutson with the Packers; his jersey number was the first retired by the Packers (1951)

The arrival of the end Don Hutson from Alabama in 1935 gave Lambeau and the Packers the most feared and dynamic offensive weapon in the game. Credited with inventing pass patterns, Hutson would lead the league in receptions in eight seasons and spur the Packers to NFL championships in 1936, 1939 and 1944. An Iron Man, Hutson played both ways, leading the league in interceptions as a safety in 1940. Hutson claimed 18 NFL records when he retired in 1945, many of which still stand. In 1951, his number 14 was the first to be retired by the Packers, and he was inducted as a charter member of the Pro Football Hall of Fame in 1963.

After Hutson's retirement, Lambeau could not stop the Packers' slide. He purchased a large lodge near Green Bay for team members and families to live in. Rockwood Lodge was the home of the 1946–49 Packers. The 1947 and 1948 seasons produced a record of 12–10–1, and 1949 was even worse at 3–9. The lodge burned down on January 24, 1950, and insurance money paid for many of the Packers' debts.

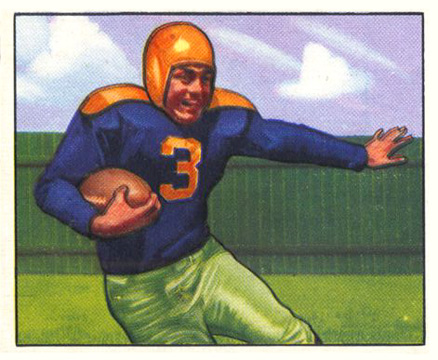
A 1950 depiction of Tony Canadeo, whose No. 3 was retired by the Packers in 1952

Curly Lambeau departed after the 1949 season. Gene Ronzani and Lisle Blackbourn could not coach the Packers back to their former magic, even as a new stadium was unveiled in 1957. The losing would descend to the disastrous 1958 campaign under coach Ray "Scooter" McLean, whose lone 1–10–1 year at the helm is the worst in Packers history.

=== Vince Lombardi years (1959–1967) ===
Former New York Giants assistant Vince Lombardi was hired as Packers head coach and general manager on February 2, 1959. Few suspected the hiring represented the beginning of a remarkable, immediate turnaround. Under Lombardi, the Packers would become the team of the 1960s, winning five championships over seven years, including victories in the first two Super Bowls. During the Lombardi era, the stars of the Packers' offense included Bart Starr, Jim Taylor, Carroll Dale, Paul Hornung (as halfback and placekicker), Forrest Gregg, and Jerry Kramer. The defense included Willie Davis, Henry Jordan, Willie Wood, Ray Nitschke, Dave Robinson, and Herb Adderley.

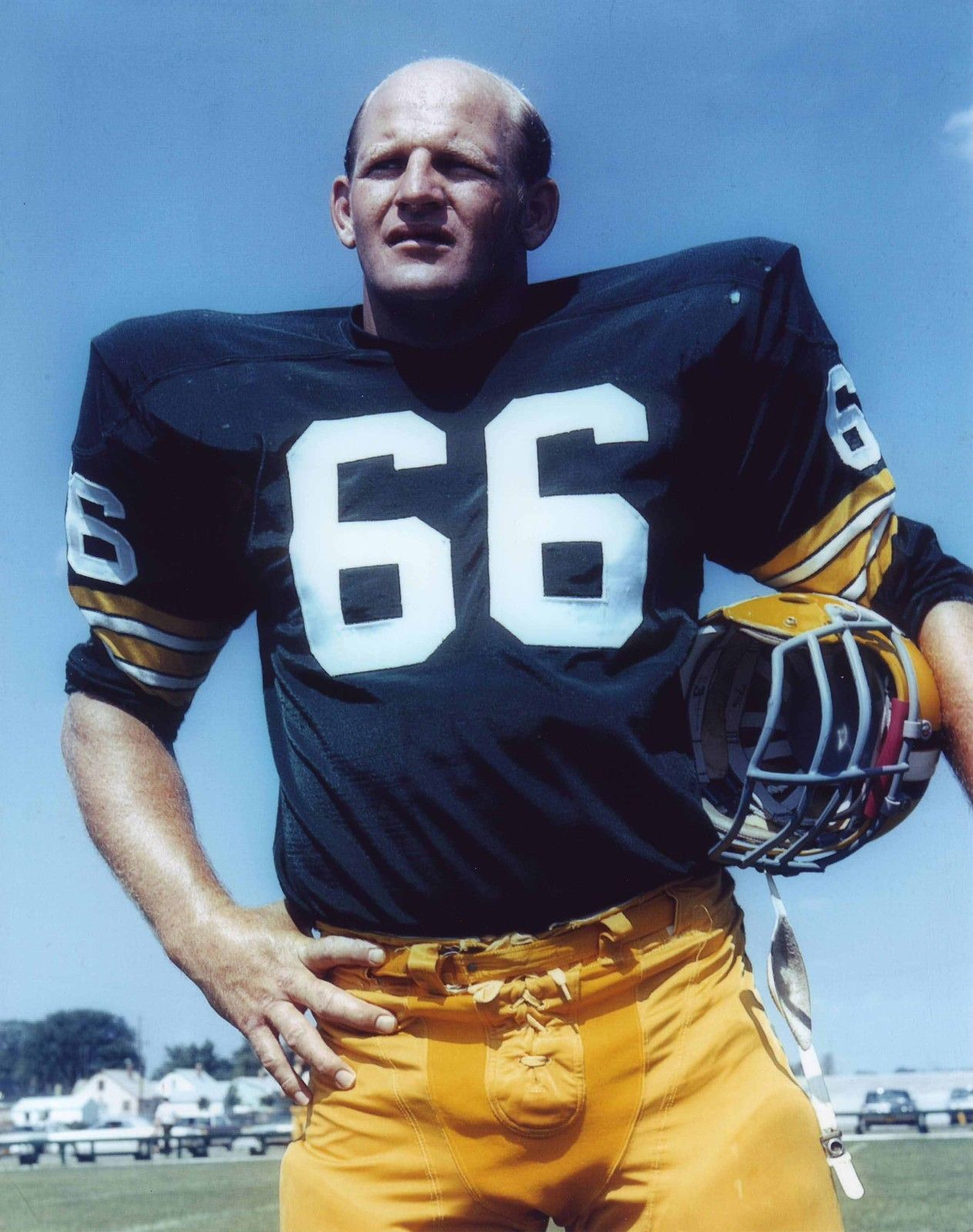
Ray Nitschke – his No. 66 jersey is one of six numbers retired by the Packers

The Packers' first regular-season game under Lombardi was on September 27, 1959, a 9–6 victory over the Chicago Bears in Green Bay. After winning their first three, the Packers lost the next five before finishing strong by sweeping their final four. The 7–5 record represented the Packers' first winning season since 1947, enough to earn rookie head coach Lombardi the NFL Coach of the Year.

The next year, the Packers, led by Paul Hornung's 176 points, won the NFL West title and played in the NFL Championship against the Philadelphia Eagles at Philadelphia. In a see-saw game, the Packers trailed by only four points when All-Pro Eagle linebacker Chuck Bednarik tackled Jim Taylor just nine yards short of the goal line as time expired.

==== NFL champions (1961, 1962, 1965) ====
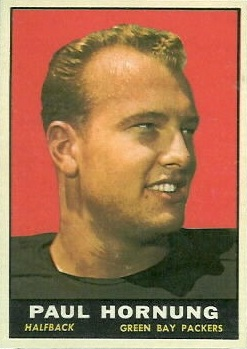
The "Golden Boy" Paul Hornung, featured on a 1961 sports card

The Packers returned to the NFL Championship game the following season and faced the New York Giants in the first league title game to be played in Green Bay. The Packers scored 24-second-quarter points, including a championship-record 19 by Paul Hornung, on special "loan" from the Army (one touchdown, four extra points, and three field goals), powering the Packers to a 37–0 rout of the Giants, their first NFL Championship since 1944. It was in 1961 that Green Bay became known as "Titletown".

The Packers stormed back in the 1962 season, jumping out to a 10–0 start on their way to a 13–1 season. This consistent level of success would lead to Lombardi's Packers becoming one of the most prominent teams of their era, and to be featured as the face of the NFL on the cover of Time on December 21, 1962, as part of the magazine's cover story on "The Sport of the '60s". Shortly after Time's article, the Packers faced the Giants in a much more brutal championship game than the previous year, but the Packers prevailed on the kicking of Jerry Kramer and the determined running of Jim Taylor. The Packers defeated the Giants in New York, 16–7. The 1963 team went 11–2–1 but finished second in the NFL West. The 1964 went 8–5–1 and finished second in the NFL West.

The Packers returned to the championship game in 1965 following a two-year absence when they defeated the Colts in a playoff for the Western Conference title. That game would be remembered for Don Chandler's controversial tying field goal in which the ball allegedly went wide right, but the officials signaled "good". The 13–10 overtime win earned the Packers a trip to the NFL Championship game, where Hornung and Taylor ran through the defending champion Cleveland Browns, helping the Packers win, 23–12, to earn their third NFL Championship under Lombardi and ninth overall. Goalpost uprights would be made taller the next year.

==== Super Bowl I champions (1966) ====
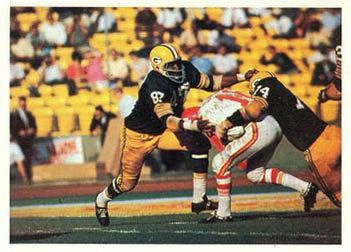
Packers Willie Davis (left) and Henry Jordan tackling a Chiefs player in the first AFL-NFL Championship (Super Bowl I)

The 1966 season saw the Packers led to the first-ever Super Bowl by MVP quarterback Bart Starr. The team went 12–2, and as time wound down in the NFL Championship against the Dallas Cowboys, the Packers clung to a 34–27 lead. Dallas had the ball on the Packers' two-yard line, threatening to tie the game, but on fourth down, the Packers' Tom Brown intercepted Don Meredith's pass in the end zone to seal the win. The team crowned its season by rolling over the AFL champion Kansas City Chiefs 35–10 in Super Bowl I.

==== Super Bowl II champions (1967) ====
The 1967 season was the last for Lombardi as the Packers' head coach. The NFL Championship game, a rematch of the 1966 contest against Dallas, became indelibly known as the "Ice Bowl" as a result of the brutally cold conditions at Lambeau Field. Still the coldest NFL game ever played, it remains one of the most famous football games at any level in the history of the sport. With 16 seconds left, Bart Starr's touchdown on a quarterback sneak brought the Packers a 21–17 victory and their still unequaled third straight NFL Championship. They then won Super Bowl II with a 33–14 victory over the Oakland Raiders. Lombardi stepped down as head coach after the game, and Phil Bengtson was named his successor. Lombardi remained as general manager for one season but left in 1969 to become head coach and minority owner of the Washington Redskins.

After Lombardi died of cancer on September 3, 1970, the NFL renamed the Super Bowl trophy the Vince Lombardi Trophy in recognition of his accomplishments with the Packers. The city of Green Bay renamed Highland Avenue in his honor in 1968, placing Lambeau Field at 1265 Lombardi Avenue ever since.

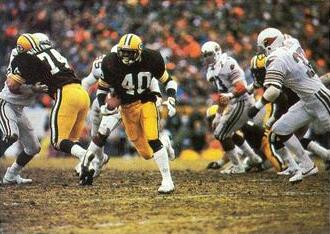
The Packers, pictured against Cardinals in the 1982–83 playoffs, only qualified for the postseason twice during the team's post-Lombardi "dark ages" (1969–91).

For about a quarter-century after Lombardi's departure, the Packers had relatively little on-field success. In the 24 seasons from 1968 to 1991, they had only five seasons with a winning record, one being the shortened 1982 strike season. They appeared in the playoffs twice, with a 1–2 record. The period saw five different head coaches—Phil Bengtson, Dan Devine, Bart Starr, Forrest Gregg, and Lindy Infante—two of whom, Starr and Gregg, were Lombardi era stars, while Bengtson was a former Packer coach. Each led the Packers to a worse record than his predecessor. Poor personnel decisions were rife, notoriously the 1974 trade by acting general manager Dan Devine which sent five 1975 or 1976 draft picks (two first-rounders, two-second-rounders and a third) to the Los Angeles Rams for aging quarterback John Hadl, who would spend only 1 1/2 seasons in Green Bay. Another came in the 1989 NFL draft, when offensive lineman Tony Mandarich was taken with the second overall pick ahead of future Hall of Fame inductees Barry Sanders, Derrick Thomas, and Deion Sanders. Though rated highly by nearly every professional scout at the time, Mandarich's performance failed to meet expectations, earning him ESPN's ranking as the third "biggest sports flop" in the last 25 years.

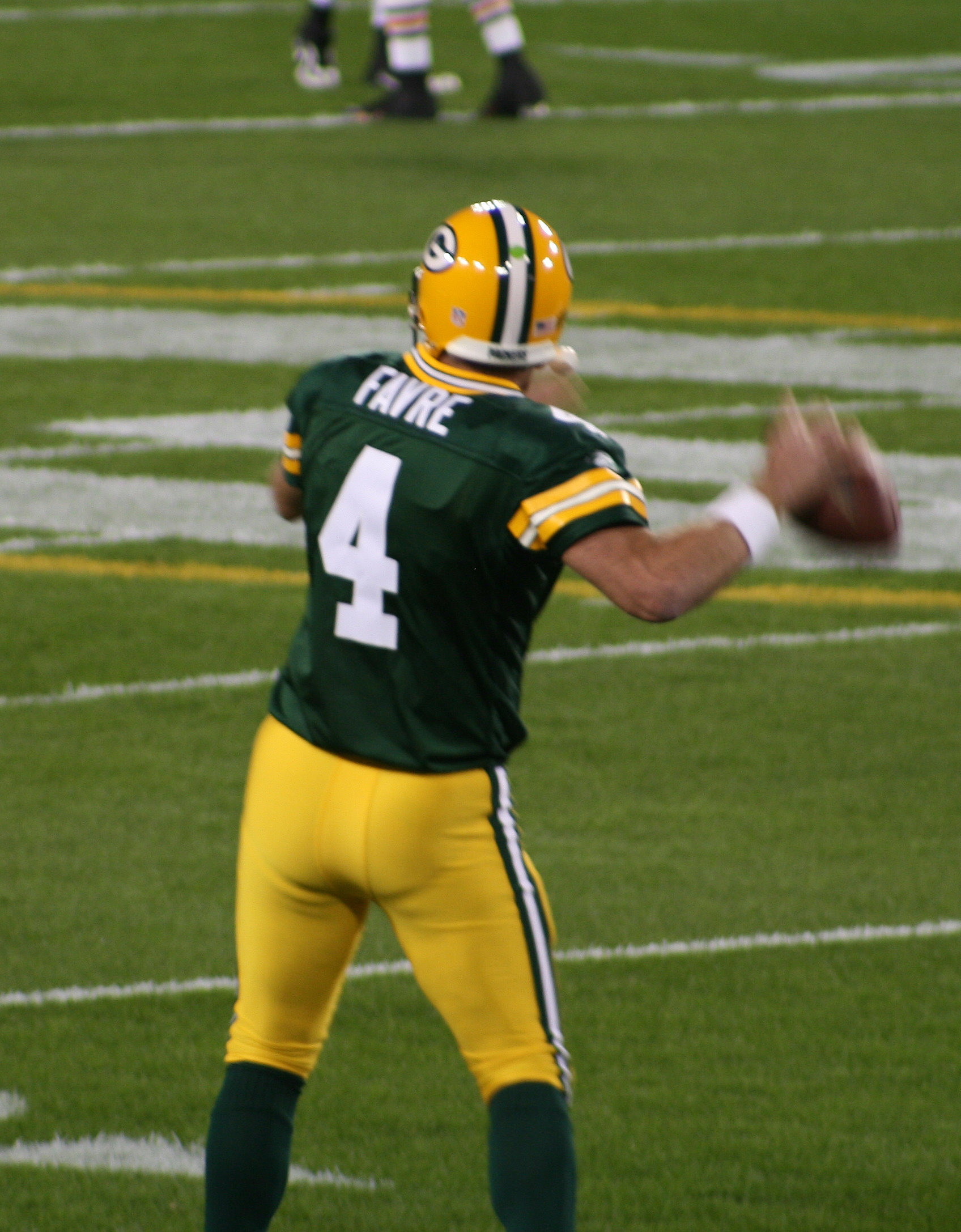
Packers great Brett Favre played for 16 years in Green Bay. He had his No. 4 jersey retired by the Packers in 2015.

The Packers' performance in the 1970s, 1980s, and early 1990s led to a shakeup, with Ron Wolf hired as general manager and given full control of the team's football operations to start the 1991 season.

=== Mike Holmgren years (1992–1998) ===
In 1992, Wolf hired San Francisco 49ers offensive coordinator Mike Holmgren as the Packers' new head coach.

Soon afterward, Wolf acquired quarterback Brett Favre from the Atlanta Falcons for a first-round pick. Favre got the Packers their first win of the 1992 season, stepping in for injured quarterback Don Majkowski and leading a comeback over the Cincinnati Bengals. He started the following week, a win against the Pittsburgh Steelers, and never missed another start for Green Bay through the end of the 2007 season. He would go on to break the record for consecutive starts by an NFL quarterback, starting 297 consecutive games including stints with the New York Jets and Minnesota Vikings with the streak finally coming to an end late in the 2010 season.

The Packers had a 9–7 record in 1992 and began to turn heads around the league when they signed perhaps the most prized free agent in NFL history in Reggie White on the defense in 1993. White believed that Wolf, Holmgren, and Favre had the team heading in the right direction with a "total commitment to winning". With White on board, the Packers made it to the second round of the playoffs during both the 1993 and 1994 seasons but lost their 2nd-round matches to their playoff rival, the Dallas Cowboys, playing in Dallas on both occasions. In 1995, the Packers won the NFC Central Division championship for the first time since 1972. After a home playoff 37–20 win against Favre's former team, the Atlanta Falcons, the Packers defeated the defending Super Bowl champion San Francisco 49ers 27–17 in San Francisco on the road to advance to the NFC Championship Game, where they lost again to the Dallas Cowboys 38–27.

==== Super Bowl XXXI champions (1996) ====
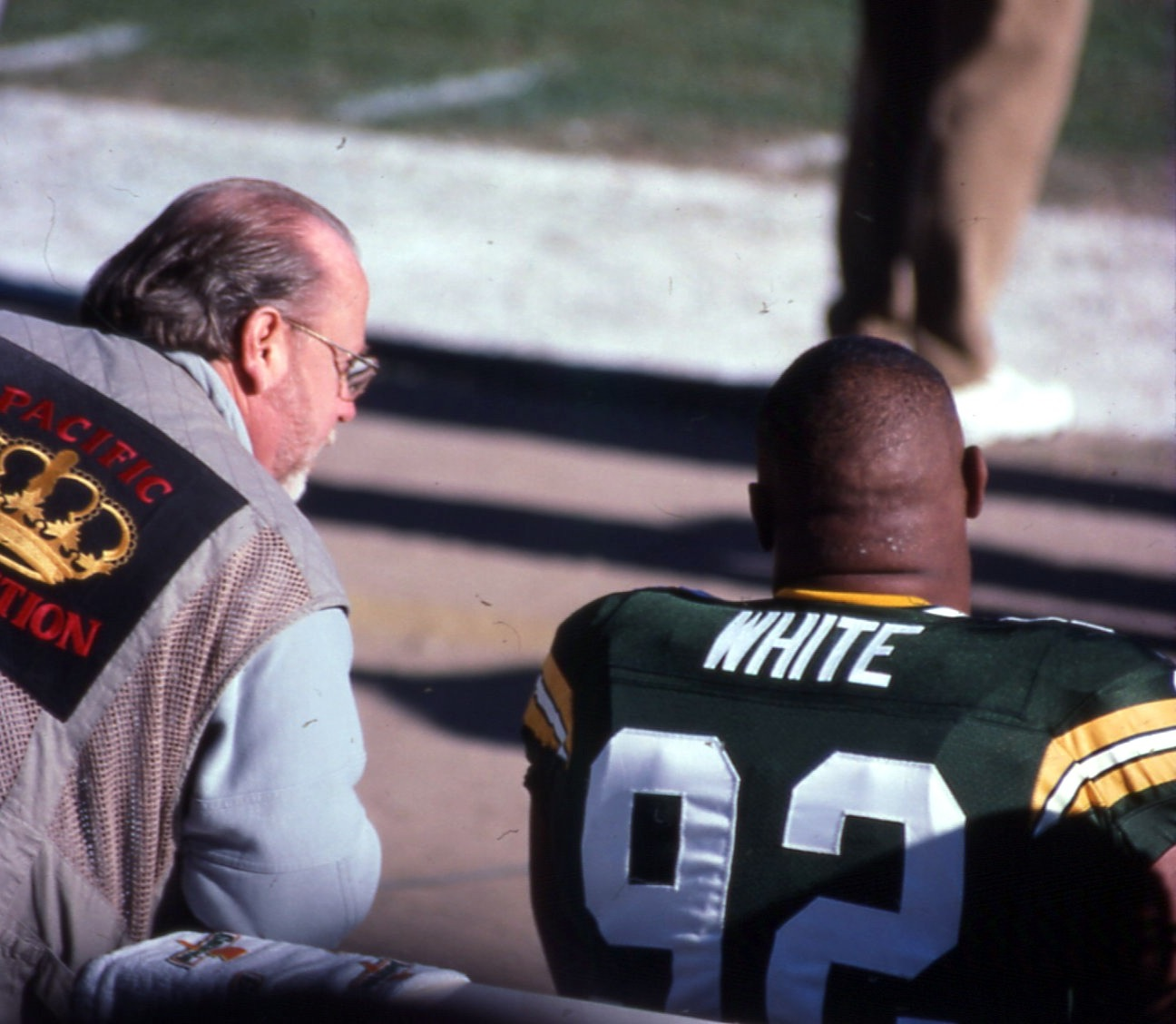
Reggie White in 1998. White is widely considered one of the greatest defensive players in NFL history, and had his number retired by the Packers in 2005.

In 1996, the Packers' turnaround was complete. The team posted a league-best 13–3 record in the regular season, dominating the competition and securing home-field advantage throughout the playoffs. They were ranked no. 1 in offense with Brett Favre leading the way, no. 1 in defense with Reggie White as the leader of the defense, and no. 1 in special teams with former Heisman Trophy winner Desmond Howard returning punts and kickoffs for touchdowns. After relatively easy wins against the San Francisco 49ers in a muddy 35–14 beatdown and Carolina Panthers 30–13, the Packers advanced to the Super Bowl for the first time in 29 years. In Super Bowl XXXI, Green Bay defeated the New England Patriots 35–21 to win their 12th championship. Desmond Howard was named MVP of the game for his kickoff return for a touchdown that ended the Patriots' bid for a comeback. Then-Packers president Bob Harlan credited Wolf, Holmgren, Favre, and White for ultimately changing the fortunes of the organization and turning the Green Bay Packers into a model NFL franchise. A 2007 panel of football experts at ESPN ranked the 1996 Packers the 6th-greatest team ever to play in the Super Bowl.

Desmond Howard's 99-yard kick return touchdown in the Superdome in Super Bowl XXXI
- Green Bay Packers return specialist Desmond Howard returns Adam Vinatieri's kickoff 99 yards for a touchdown in Super Bowl XXXI, January 26, 1997

The following season the Packers recorded another 13–3 record and won their second consecutive NFC championship. After defeating the Tampa Bay Buccaneers 21–7 and San Francisco 49ers 23–10 in the playoffs, the Packers returned to the Super Bowl as an 11 1/2 point favorite. The team ended up losing in an upset to John Elway and the Denver Broncos in Super Bowl XXXII, by the score of 31–24.

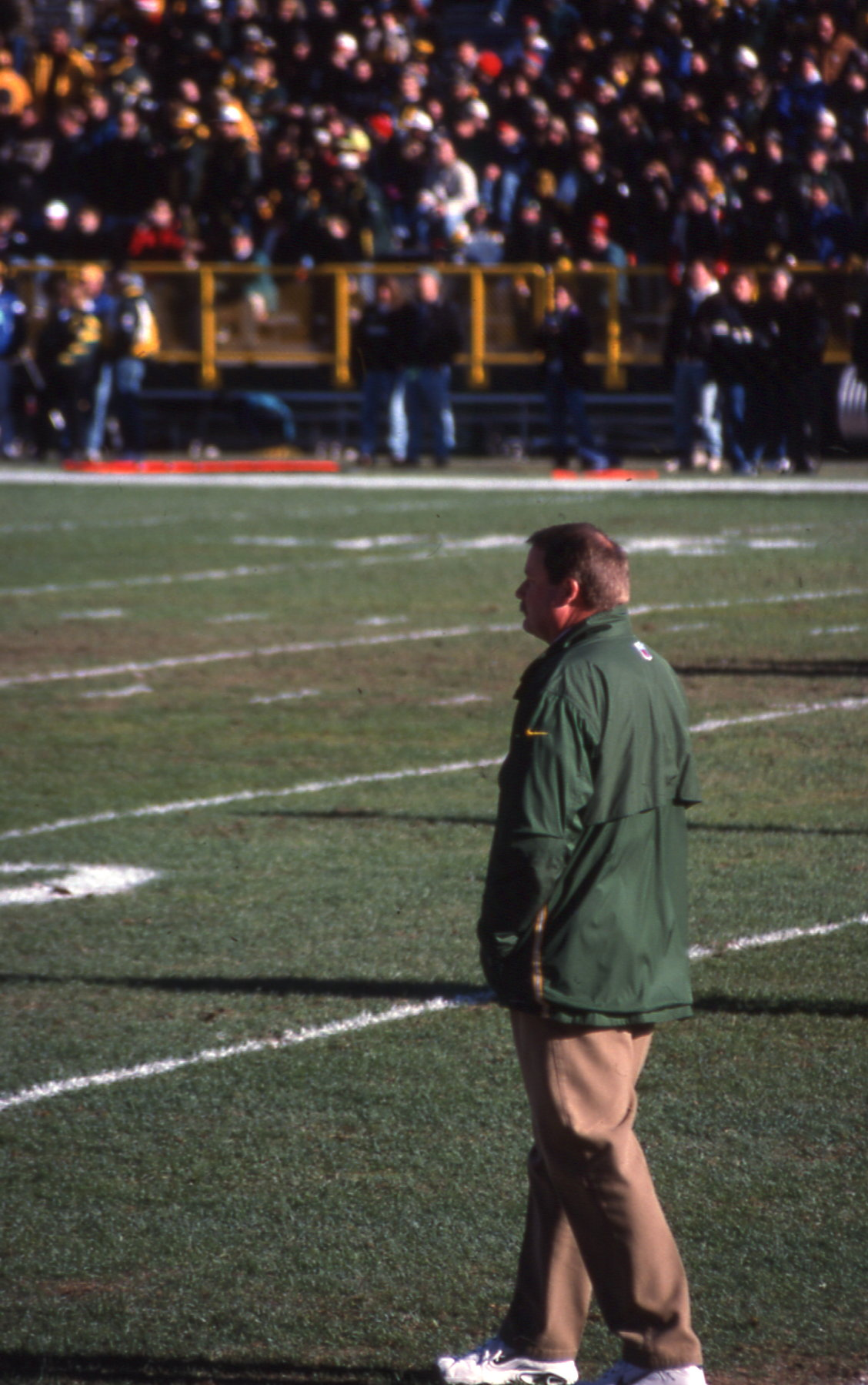
Holmgren, one of three Packer coaches to win a Super Bowl, pictured in 1998

In 1998, the Packers went 11–5 and met the San Francisco 49ers in the first round of the NFC playoffs. It was the fourth consecutive year these teams had met in the playoffs and the sixth overall contest since the 1995 season. The Packers had won all previous games, and the media speculated that another 49ers loss would result in the dismissal of San Francisco head coach Steve Mariucci. Unlike the previous playoff matches, this game was hotly contested, with the teams frequently exchanging leads. With 4:19 left in the 4th quarter, Brett Favre and the Packers embarked on an 89-yard drive, which concluded with a Favre touchdown pass to receiver Antonio Freeman. This play appeared to give Green Bay the victory. But San Francisco quarterback Steve Young led the 49ers on an improbable touchdown drive, which culminated when Terrell Owens caught Young's pass between several defenders to give the 49ers a lead with three seconds remaining. Afterward, the game was mired in controversy. Many argued that during the 49ers game-winning drive, Niners receiver Jerry Rice fumbled the ball but officials stated he was down by contact. Television replays confirmed the fumble, but referees were unable to review the play; the next season the NFL reinstituted an instant replay system. In the end, this game turned out to be the end of an era in Green Bay. Days later Mike Holmgren left the Packers to become vice president, general manager, and head coach of the Seattle Seahawks. Much of Holmgren's coaching staff went with him, and Reggie White also retired after the season (but later played one season for the Carolina Panthers in 2000).

In 1999, the team struggled to find an identity after the departure of so many of the individuals responsible for their Super Bowl run. Ray Rhodes was hired in 1999 as the team's new head coach. Rhodes had served around the league as a highly regarded defensive coordinator and more recently experienced moderate success as head coach of the Philadelphia Eagles from 1995 to 1998. Ron Wolf believed that Rhodes' experience and player-friendly demeanor would fit nicely in Green Bay's veteran locker room, but Rhodes was fired after one 8–8 season. Wolf visited team practice late in the 1999 season and believed that players had become too comfortable with Rhodes' style, and said the atmosphere resembled a country club.

In 2000, Wolf replaced Rhodes with Mike Sherman. Sherman had never been a head coach at any level of football and was relatively unknown in NFL circles. He had only coached in professional football for three years starting as the Packers' tight ends coach in 1997 and 1998. In 1999, he followed Mike Holmgren to Seattle and became the Seahawks' offensive coordinator, although Sherman did not call the plays during games. Despite Sherman's apparent anonymity, Wolf was blown away in the interview process by the coach's organizational skills and attention to detail. Sherman's inaugural season started slowly, but the Packers won their final four games to achieve a 9–7 record. Brett Favre praised the atmosphere Sherman had cultivated in Green Bay's locker room and fans were optimistic about the team's future. In the offseason, however, Wolf suddenly announced his own resignation as general manager to take effect after the April 2001 draft. Packers' president Bob Harlan was surprised by Wolf's decision and felt unsure of how to replace him. Harlan preferred the structure Green Bay had employed since 1991; a general manager who ran football operations and hired a subservient head coach. But with the momentum and locker room chemistry that was built during the 2000 season, Harlan was reluctant to bring in a new individual with a potentially different philosophy. Wolf recommended that Harlan give the job to Sherman. Though Harlan was wary of the structure in principle, he agreed with Wolf that it was the best solution. In 2001, Sherman assumed the duties of both general manager and head coach.

From 2001 to 2004, Sherman coached the Packers to respectable regular-season success, led by the spectacular play of Brett Favre, Ahman Green, and a formidable offensive line. But Sherman's teams faltered in the playoffs. Before 2003, the Packers had never lost a home playoff game since the NFL instituted a post-season in 1933 (they were 13–0, with 11 of the wins at Lambeau and two more in Milwaukee.). That ended on January 4, 2003, when the Atlanta Falcons defeated the Packers 27–7 in an NFC Wild Card game. The Packers would also lose at home in the playoffs to the Minnesota Vikings two years later.

By the end of the 2004 season, the Packers' team depth appeared to be diminishing. Sherman also seemed overworked and reportedly had trouble communicating with players on the practice field with whom he was also negotiating contracts. Harlan felt the dual roles were too much for one man to handle and removed Sherman from the general manager position in early 2005 while retaining him as a head coach. Harlan hired the Seattle Seahawks' vice president of operations Ted Thompson as the new executive vice president, general manager, and director of football operations. The relationship between Thompson and Sherman appeared strained, as Thompson immediately began rebuilding Green Bay's roster. Following a dismal 4–12 season, Thompson fired Sherman.

=== Mike McCarthy years (2006–2018) ===
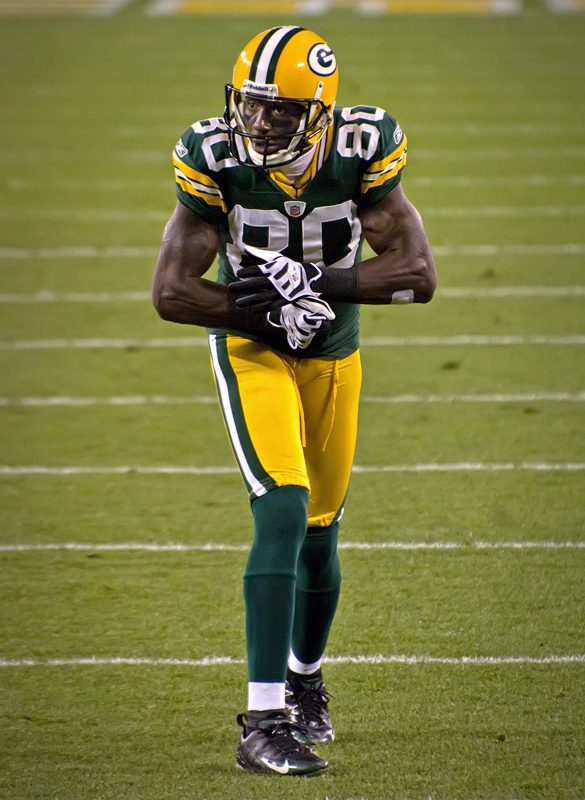
Former Packers wide receiver Donald Driver

In 2006, Thompson hired Mike McCarthy, former offensive coordinator for the San Francisco 49ers and New Orleans Saints, as head coach. McCarthy had served as quarterbacks coach for the Packers in 1999. In McCarthy's debut year coaching the Packers, the team began with a 4–8 record. Then, Brett Favre sustained injuries, as did backup quarterback, Aaron Rodgers. Despite the injuries, McCarthy coached the team to four consecutive wins, finishing with an 8–8 record.

After missing the playoffs in 2006, Favre announced he would return for the 2007 season, it would be one of his best. The Packers finished 13–3, earning a first-round bye in the playoffs. The Packers' passing offense finished second in the NFC, behind the Dallas Cowboys, and third in the league. Running back Ryan Grant, became the featured back in Green Bay. In the divisional playoff round, in a snowstorm, the Packers beat the Seattle Seahawks 42–20. Grant rushed for 201 yards and three touchdowns, while Favre tossed an additional three touchdown passes to receiver Donald Driver (as well as a snowball, in celebration). On January 20, 2008, Green Bay appeared in their first NFC Championship Game in 10 years facing the New York Giants. The game was lost 23–20 on a field goal by Lawrence Tynes. This would be Favre's final game as a Packer. McCarthy coached the NFC team during the 2008 Pro Bowl in Hawaii.

In December 2007, Ted Thompson was signed to a 5-year contract extension with the Packers. On February 5, 2008, McCarthy signed a 5-year contract extension. On March 4, Favre announced his retirement. Within five months, however, he filed for reinstatement. On August 6, it was announced that Favre was traded to the New York Jets for a conditional draft pick in 2009.

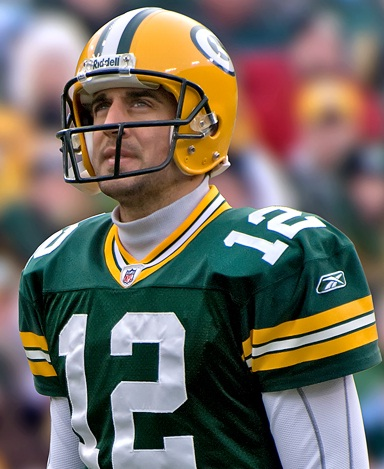
Quarterback Aaron Rodgers in 2008

The Packers began their 2008 season with their 2005 first-round draft pick, quarterback Aaron Rodgers, under center, as the first QB other than Favre to start for the Packers in 16 years. Rodgers played well in his first year, throwing for over 4,000 yards and 28 touchdowns. However, injuries plagued the Packers' defense, as they lost 7 close games by 4 points or fewer, finishing with a 6–10 record. 8 assistant coaches were dismissed, including Bob Sanders, the team's defensive coordinator, who was replaced by Dom Capers.

In March 2009, the organization assured fans that Favre's jersey number would be retired, but not during the 2009 season. In April 2009, the Packers selected nose tackle B. J. Raji of Boston College as the team's first pick in the draft. The team then traded three draft picks for another first-round pick, selecting linebacker Clay Matthews III. During the 2009 NFL season, two matchups between the franchise and Favre were highly anticipated after Favre's arrival with division-rival Vikings in August. The first encounter took place in Week 4, a Monday Night Football game that broke TV audience records. This scheduling was made possible when Baseball Commissioner and Packer board of directors member Bud Selig forced baseball's Minnesota Twins to play 2 games within 12 hours. The Vikings won 30–23; Favre threw 3 TDs, no interceptions, and had a passer rating of 135. The teams met again in Week 8, Favre leading the Vikings to a second win, 38–26, in Green Bay. Rodgers was heavily pressured in both games, being sacked 14 times total, but still played well, throwing five touchdowns. The next week, the Packers were upset by the winless Tampa Bay Buccaneers. Green Bay won 7 of their last 8 games, including their 16th regular-season finale from 17 seasons, and earning an NFC wild-card playoff bid with an 11–5 regular-season record. Rodgers became the first quarterback in NFL history to throw for at least 4,000 yards in each of his first two seasons as a starter. Cornerback Charles Woodson won NFL Defensive Player of the Year honors, his 9 interceptions were more than the 8 collected by all Packer opponents. The season ended with an overtime loss in a wild card round shootout at the Arizona Cardinals, 51–45. It was the second time McCarthy led the Packers to the postseason. While they were not as successful as their 90s counterparts in the postseason, the 2000s were by no means a dark time for the Packers. The team finished the decade with the 5th highest winning percentage.

==== Super Bowl XLV champions (2010) ====
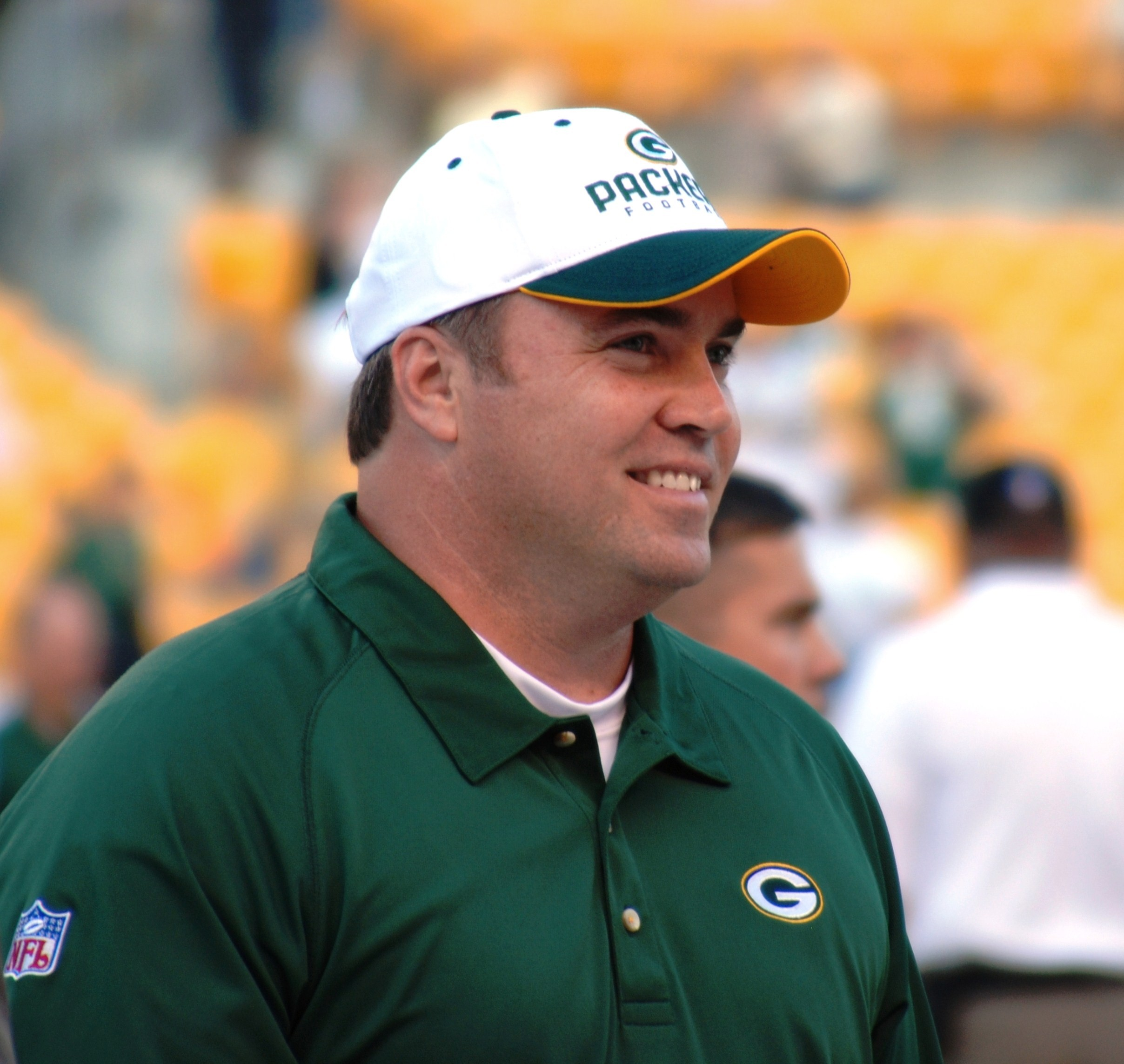
Former Super Bowl winning Packers head coach Mike McCarthy

The team lost Johnny Jolly to a season long suspension after he violated NFL drug policy. Their running corps suffered a blow when RB Ryan Grant sustained a season-ending ankle injury in Week 1. By the end of the season, the team had 16 people on injured reserve, including 7 starters. Key injuries did not stop McCarthy's team from finishing the regular season with a 10–6 record. In week 7, the team faced the Minnesota Vikings, then led by former Packers quarterback Brett Favre. Green Bay beat Favre's new team 28–24 when Favre's final pass to Randy Moss in the end zone flew incomplete. In week 17, the Packers clinched their playoff berth with a 10–3 victory over the Chicago Bears at Lambeau Field, aided in large part by Nick Collins' interception of Jay Cutler's throw that allowed Green Bay to run out the clock.

The Packers 10–6 record allowed them to clinch the No. 6 seed in the NFC playoffs. They first faced Philadelphia, winning 21–16. In the Divisional round, they defeated No. 1 seed Atlanta 48–21. They then played the Chicago Bears at Soldier Field in the NFC Championship Game—only the second playoff meeting between the two storied rivals. Packers won 21–14 to move on to Super Bowl XLV, having secured a 3–0 record in the postseason.

On the evening before the Super Bowl, McCarthy had each player fitted for a championship ring. Aware of the motivational tactic, team president Mark Murphy instructed his organization to begin designing the ring. The following day on February 6, 2011, they defeated the AFC champion Pittsburgh Steelers 31–25, becoming the first No. 6 seed from the NFC to win a Super Bowl. It was the first time the Packers had won the Lombardi Trophy since 1996. Aaron Rodgers was named Super Bowl MVP.

During Super Bowl XLV, McCarthy's team initially enjoyed a comfortable 21–3 lead over the Steelers. Then, Charles Woodson had to leave the game with a broken collarbone and the Steelers' Hines Ward found the endzone to make the score 21–10 by halftime. During the third quarter, Pittsburgh scored 7 more points. In the fourth quarter, Green Bay's Clay Matthews tackled Pittsburgh's Rashard Mendenhall, and Desmond Bishop recovered the ball for a key turnover.

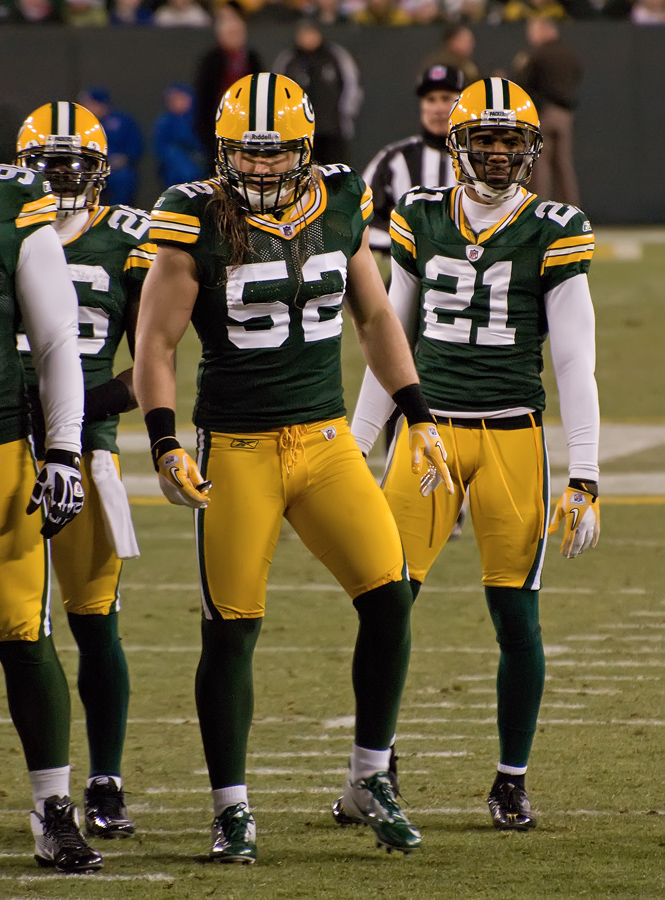
Clay Matthews (52) and Charles Woodson (21), defensive stars for the Packers under McCarthy

In 2011, the Packers won their first 13 games, eventually finishing the season 15–1, a franchise record for wins in a season and tied for the second-most regular-season wins in NFL history, behind only the 2007 Patriots who went 16–0. Aaron Rodgers was named the NFL's MVP, his first such award. McCarthy's offensive strategies aided Rodgers in throwing for 4,643 yards and 45 touchdowns. These strategies propelled the Packers to lead the NFL in scoring that year. Despite receiving homefield advantage, Green Bay lost their first postseason game to eventual Super Bowl XLVI champion New York Giants, 37–20.

Finishing the 2012 season with an 11–5 record and their second straight division title, the Packers beat the Minnesota Vikings in the NFC wild-card round 24–10, but lost in the playoffs to the eventual NFC Champion San Francisco 49ers by 45–31. The Packers offense finished the season fifth in points. Rodgers passed for 4,295 yards. The Packers topped the first-ever AP Pro32 rankings, a new pro football version of the AP Top 25 college football and basketball polls.

In 2013, the Packers started 5–2, leading up to a Week 9 match up against the Bears. It was in that game that the Packers lost Rodgers to a broken collarbone; Rodgers missed the next six games, during which the club would go 2–3–1 under three different quarterbacks. Despite having a 7–7–1 record, the Packers were still in a position to win the NFC North division, if they were able to win their final game. With Rodgers returning, the Packers managed to beat the Bears in a Week 9 rematch, 33–28. Finishing at 8–7–1, the Packers won their division and were awarded a home playoff game. It was the fifth consecutive time that McCarthy led his team to a playoff appearance. However, the Packers would lose to the 49ers 20–23 in the playoffs.

The Packers recorded their 700th victory, against the Bears, in Week 4 of 2014. The team went undefeated at home for the first time since the 2011 season; they led the league in scoring, with 486 points. 2014 marked the first time since 2009 that the team had a 4,000-yard passer, two 1,000-yard receivers, and a 1,000-yard rusher. McCarthy led an offense that finished sixth in the league in total offense. After winning against the Tampa Bay Buccaneers in Week 16, McCarthy (99 wins) passed Hall of Famer Vince Lombardi (98) on the all-time wins list for the Packers. Overall, the team went 12–4, clinching a fourth consecutive NFC North division title, making the playoffs for the sixth straight season, tying a franchise record. The Packers beat the Cowboys in the divisional round, advancing to the NFC Championship to face the Seattle Seahawks. After leading throughout most of regulation, the Packers lost 28–22 in an overtime rally by Seattle. Rodgers was named the league's Most Valuable Player for the second time.

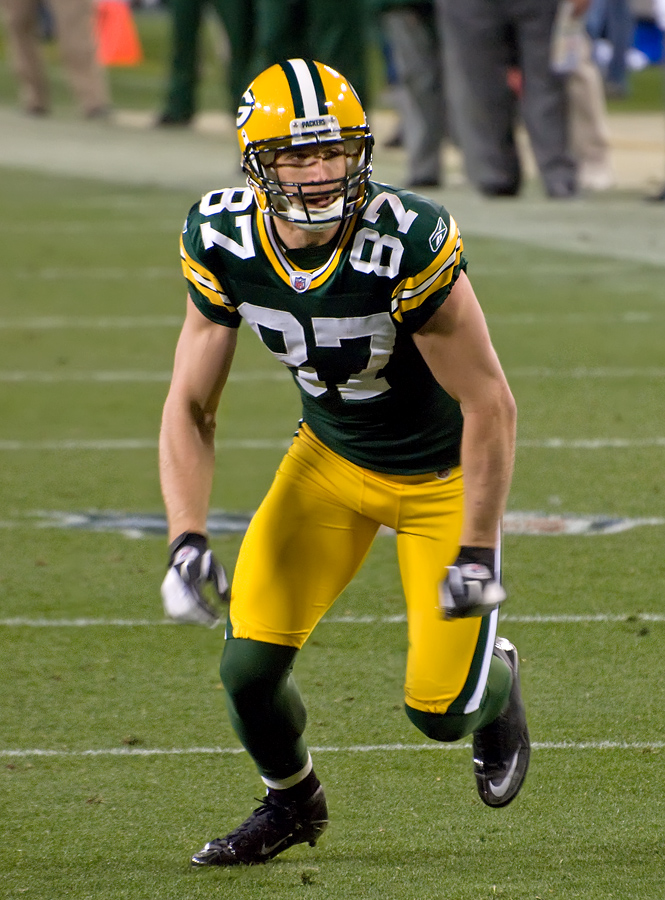
Jordy Nelson, who tore his ACL in the 2015 preseason, would go on to be the NFL Comeback Player of the Year the following 2016 season upon returning from his injury.

During Week 2 of the 2015 preseason against the Pittsburgh Steelers, wide receiver Jordy Nelson caught an eight-yard pass from Aaron Rodgers but fell to the turf, Nelson had torn his ACL. He would remain inactive for the rest of 2015. Even without Nelson, the Packers managed to get off to a 6–0 start, but then lost four of their next five games, falling to 7–4. On December 3, against the Detroit Lions, the Packers quickly fell to a 20–0 deficit going into halftime. Green Bay started to make a comeback in the second half thanks to a touchdown by Davante Adams and a 27-yard touchdown run by Rodgers to narrow the game to 23–21. The Packers then got the ball back with 23 seconds left. While attempting a "lateral" play, Rodgers was sacked with no time remaining but then a flag was thrown for a facemask penalty on Detroit. The Packers now had one more un-timed play, which Rodgers threw a 61-yard Hail Mary touchdown to tight end Richard Rodgers. It was the longest Hail Mary touchdown pass thrown in NFL history.

Up until week 14, McCarthy delegated playcalling duties to associate head coach Tom Clements. However, the team's struggling offense made McCarthy decide to take back play-calling duties. During that first game that McCarthy resumed play calling, the Packers ran the ball for 230 yards in 44 carries. Green Bay then finished the season 10–6 and 2nd in the NFC North behind the Minnesota Vikings. The Packers beat the Washington Redskins in the NFC wild-card game to advance to the divisional round with the Arizona Cardinals. A similar play to tie the game against the Cardinals happened between Aaron Rodgers and Jeff Janis. Janis caught a 41-yard touchdown which sent the game into overtime. However, the Packers fell to Arizona 26–20, ending their season.

After a 4–6 start to the 2017 season, the Packers went on a six-game winning streak to finish the regular season with a 10–6 record. The team clinched the NFC North for the fifth time in six years. They routed the New York Giants, 38–13, in the wild-card round of the playoffs and upset the top-seeded Dallas Cowboys, 34–31, in the divisional round, but their season ended when they were beaten by the Atlanta Falcons in the NFC Championship Game, 44–21.

The Packers began the 2017 regular season with a 4–2 record. On October 15, during a week 6 game, Rodgers was driven to the ground by Minnesota Vikings linebacker Anthony Barr. Rodgers suffered a broken collarbone, and the Packers placed him on injured reserve, with the stipulation that he could return, especially if the injury healed quickly and the Packers were still in playoff contention. Rodgers did return for a week 15 game against the Carolina Panthers on December 17, but the Packers were eliminated from the playoff hunt after a 31–24 loss. The team placed Rodgers back on injured reserve, which prompted several teams to complain the Packers had violated rules about reactivating injured players. During Rodgers' absence, backup quarterback Brett Hundley stepped into the starting role for the first time in his professional career, but struggled to replicate Rodgers' success, despite a Pro Bowl-caliber season by receiver Davante Adams. In a 23–0 loss to the Baltimore Ravens in week 11, the Packers suffered their first shutout at Lambeau Field in 11 years. The Packers finished the season at 7–9, missing the playoffs for the first time since 2008. Off the field, the Packers organization opened the Titletown District adjacent to Lambeau Field. This shopping, entertainment, and restaurant district includes a public plaza, park, and commercial businesses.

In 2018, the Packers again failed to qualify for the playoffs, finishing third in the NFC North with a record of 6–9–1. Following a Week 13 loss to the Cardinals, McCarthy was released as head coach, replaced by Offensive Coordinator Joe Philbin on an interim basis. McCarthy left having tallied a 125–77–2 (.618) regular season record, as well as a postseason record of 10–8 (.556). His total record with the Packers was 135–85–2. McCarthy had brought the team to nine playoff berths and a Super Bowl win. Following the season, Matt LaFleur, the Offensive Coordinator of the Tennessee Titans the prior season, was hired as the Packers' new coach.

=== Matt LaFleur years (2019–present) ===
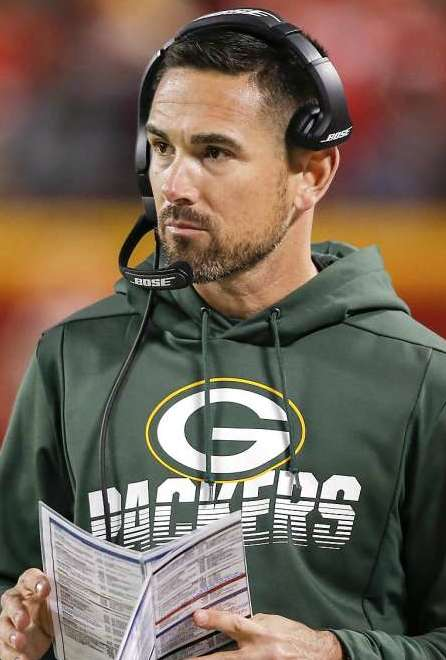
Matt Lafleur calling from his playsheet

Under first-year head coach Matt LaFleur, Aaron Rodgers and the Packers opened the season by defeating the Chicago Bears in the season's opening game, the first time since 2003 that the league-wide kickoff game did not feature the defending Super Bowl champions, with the Packers and Bears being selected for their historic rivalry in the NFL's 100th season. The Packers returned to the playoffs for the first time since 2016, finishing with a record of 13–3 and securing a first-round bye as the NFC's second seed. They defeated the Seattle Seahawks 28–23 in the NFC Divisional round to advance to the NFC Championship game, where they were defeated 37–20 by the San Francisco 49ers.

In 2020, the Green Bay Packers won the NFC North Division for the second consecutive year. They also earned a first-round bye, with the top seed in the NFC. They defeated the Los Angeles Rams 32–18 in the Divisional Round, but fell to the underdog Tampa Bay Buccaneers in the NFC championship- their fourth straight loss in the game in five appearances under Rodgers. Rodgers won his third MVP award during the season.

The next year, they clinched the top seed in the NFC again, with a 13–4 record, before losing 13–10 to the 49ers in the Divisional round. The special teams unit was consistently the worst in the NFL during the season, though their defense was noted as an improvement from previous seasons. The special teams was especially costly in the postseason game as a field goal attempt and punt were both blocked, the latter of which the 49ers returned for a touchdown. The defense did not allow any touchdowns in that game, as the only other points the 49ers scored were off two field goals. Matt LaFleur became the first coach to have three straight 13-win seasons, however, none of them ended with a trip to the Super Bowl. For his performance in the season, Aaron Rodgers won his fourth MVP award- the second most for any quarterback, only behind Peyton Manning who has five.

In the 2022 season, the Green Bay Packers struggled and were eliminated from advancing to the NFL's wild-card playoffs when they lost their last regular-season game 20–16 to the Detroit Lions. This was the first time the team missed the playoffs during Matt LaFleur's coaching stint. The team finished with an 8–9 record.

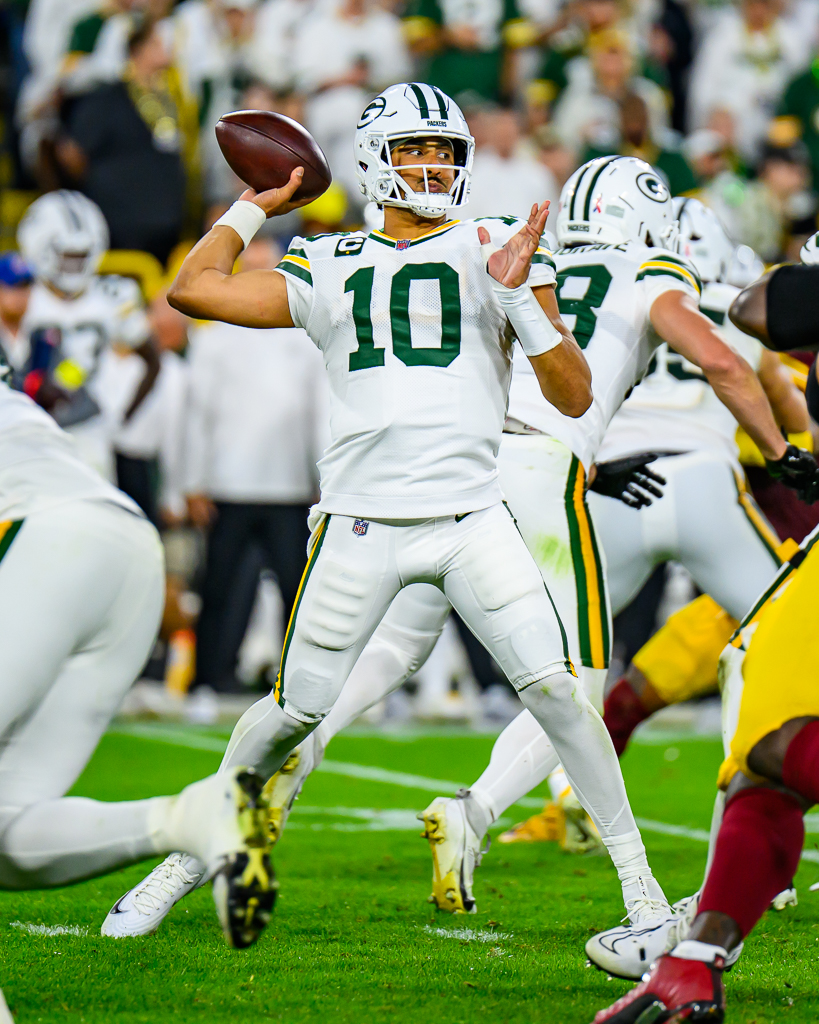
Quarterback Jordan Love in 2025

The 2023 season was the first without longtime quarterback Aaron Rodgers, who was traded to the New York Jets during the offseason. Jordan Love, who was drafted to the Green Bay Packers in 2020, took over as starting quarterback. The team finished with an 9–8 record which secured 2nd place in the NFC North division, and the 7th seed in the NFC. The Packers defeated the 2nd seed Dallas Cowboys 48–32 in their Wild-Card matchup, becoming the first 7th seed team to win a playoff game. The Packers would go on to lose to the 1st seed San Francisco 49ers 24–21 in the Divisional round. Following the loss, the team announced that defensive coordinator Joe Barry would not return next season.

In 2024 the Packers finished the season with a record of 11–6. This was thanks in part due to some new additions to the team, including running back Josh Jacobs and safety Xavier McKinney, who were both named to the Pro Bowl that year. New backup quarterback Malik Willis, who was acquired in a trade with the Tennessee Titans during the preseason, filled in and won multiple games for an injured Jordan Love. Some other additions to the team came in the coaching department, including new defensive coordinator Jeff Hafley, and former New York Jets head coach Robert Saleh, who joined the team as an offensive assistant shortly after being fired by the Jets following a 2–3 start. Despite their record however, the Packers only managed to finish in 3rd place in the NFC North. Both the Detroit Lions and the Minnesota Vikings finished above them at 1st and 2nd with records of 15–2 and 14–3 respectively. Their record was still good enough to earn the 7th seed in the NFC for the second year in a row. In their Wild-Card matchup, the Packers were defeated by the 2nd seeded Philadelphia Eagles with a final score of 22–10.

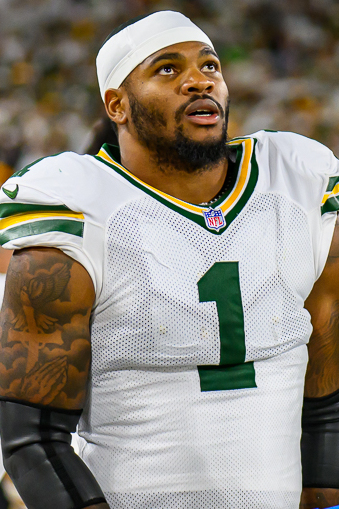
Defensive End Micah Parsons is the first Packer to wear the number 1 since Curly Lambeau

During the offseason, the city of Green Bay hosted the 2025 NFL Draft, marking their first time hosting the annual event. On July 13, 2025, Packers President Mark Murphy turned 70 years old, which is the organizations mandatory retirement age, thus ending his 17+ year tenure as President of the team. Ed Policy, who has been with the team since 2012, was selected to succeed Murphy as president, chairman, and CEO in a unanimous decision from the board of directors. The story of the offseason came just after the preseason ended, when the Packers traded for star Dallas Cowboys pass rusher Micah Parsons in exchange for two first round picks and defensive tackle Kenny Clark. Despite a promising start to the season, the Packers were marred by injuries to several notable players, including tight end Tucker Kraft and the aforementioned Parsons, both of whom were in the middle of standout seasons before going down to season ending ACL tears. Other players that missed multiple games due to injury include QB Jordan Love, WR Jayden Reed, DT Devonte Wyatt, RB Josh Jacobs, C Elgton Jenkins, and OT Zach Bako-Bewele. The Packers finished the season with a 4-game losing streak and a record of 9–7–1, earning the NFC's 7th seed in the playoffs for the third straight year. They would go on to lose to the 2nd seed Chicago Bears in the Wild-Card matchup, with a final score of 27–31, despite leading by 18 points at halftime.

== Community ownership ==
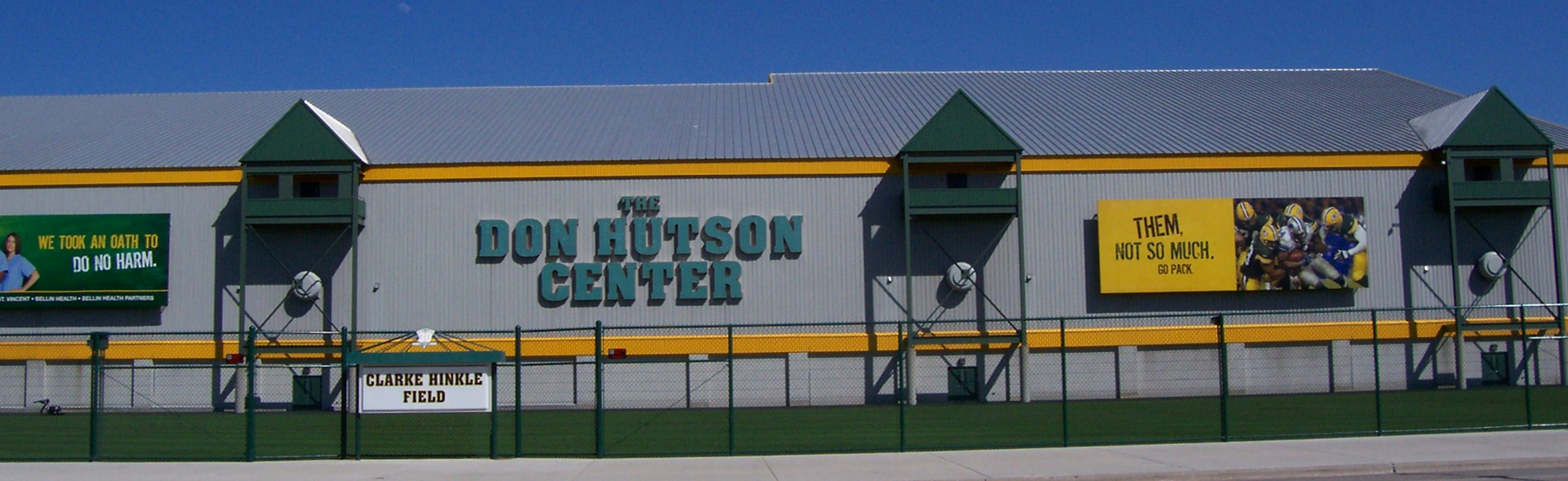
The Don Hutson Center

The Packers are the only community-owned franchise in North America's four traditional major leagues. Rather than being the property of an individual, partnership, or corporate entity, they are held by stockholders, more than 537,000 in total as of 2022. No one is allowed to hold more than 200,000 shares. It is this broad-based community support and non-profit structure which has kept the team in Green Bay for nearly a century even though it is the smallest market in North American professional sports.

The city of Green Bay had a population of only 107,395 as of the 2020 census, and 600,000 in its television market, significantly less than the average NFL figures. The team, however, has long had an extended fan base throughout Wisconsin and parts of the Midwest, thanks in part to playing one pre-season and three regular-season home games each year in Milwaukee through 1995. It was only when baseball-only Miller Park preempted football there that the Packers' home slate became played entirely in Green Bay.

As of 2021, there have been six stock sales to fund Packer operations over the team's history, beginning with $5,000 being raised through 1,000 shares offered at $5 apiece in 1923. The latest was in November 2021, where they sold almost 200,000 shares.

The original "Articles of Incorporation for the Green Bay Football Corporation", enacted in 1923, specified that should the franchise be sold, any post-expenses money would have gone to the Sullivan-Wallen Post of the American Legion to build "a proper soldier's memorial". This stipulation was included to ensure there could never be any financial inducement for shareholders to move the club from Green Bay. At the November 1997 annual meeting, shareholders voted to change the beneficiary from the Sullivan-Wallen Post to the Green Bay Packers Foundation, which makes donations to many charities and institutions throughout Wisconsin.

Even though it is referred to as "common stock" in corporate offering documents, a share of Packers stock does not share the same rights traditionally associated with common or preferred stock. It does not include an equity interest, does not pay dividends, cannot be traded, has no securities-law protection, and brings no season ticket purchase privileges. All shareholders receive are voting rights, an invitation to the corporation's annual meeting, and an opportunity to buy exclusive shareholder-only merchandise. Shares of stock cannot be resold, except back to the team for a fraction of the original price. While new shares can be given as gifts, transfers are technically allowed only between immediate family members once ownership has been established.

Green Bay is the only team with this form of ownership structure in the NFL, which does not comply with current league rules stipulating a maximum of 32 owners per team, with one holding a minimum 30% stake. The Packers' corporation was grandfathered when the NFL's current ownership policy was established in the 1980s. As a publicly held nonprofit, the Packers are also the only American major-league sports franchise to release its financial balance sheet every year.

=== Board of directors ===
Green Bay Packers, Inc., is governed by a seven-member executive committee elected from a 45-member board of directors. It consists of a president, vice president, treasurer, secretary, and three members-at-large; only the president is compensated. Responsibilities include directing corporate management, approving major capital expenditures, establishing broad policy, and monitoring management performance.

The team's elected president normally represents the Packers in NFL owner's meetings. During his time as coach, Vince Lombardi generally represented the team at league meetings in his role as general manager, except at owners-only meetings, where president Dominic Olejniczak appeared.

=== Green Bay Packers Foundation ===
The team created the Green Bay Packers Foundation in December 1986. It assists in a wide variety of activities and programs benefiting education, civic affairs, health services, human services and youth-related programs.

At the team's 1997 annual stockholders meeting the foundation was designated in place of a Sullivan-Wallen Post soldiers memorial as the recipient of any residual assets upon the team's sale or dissolution.

== Fan base ==
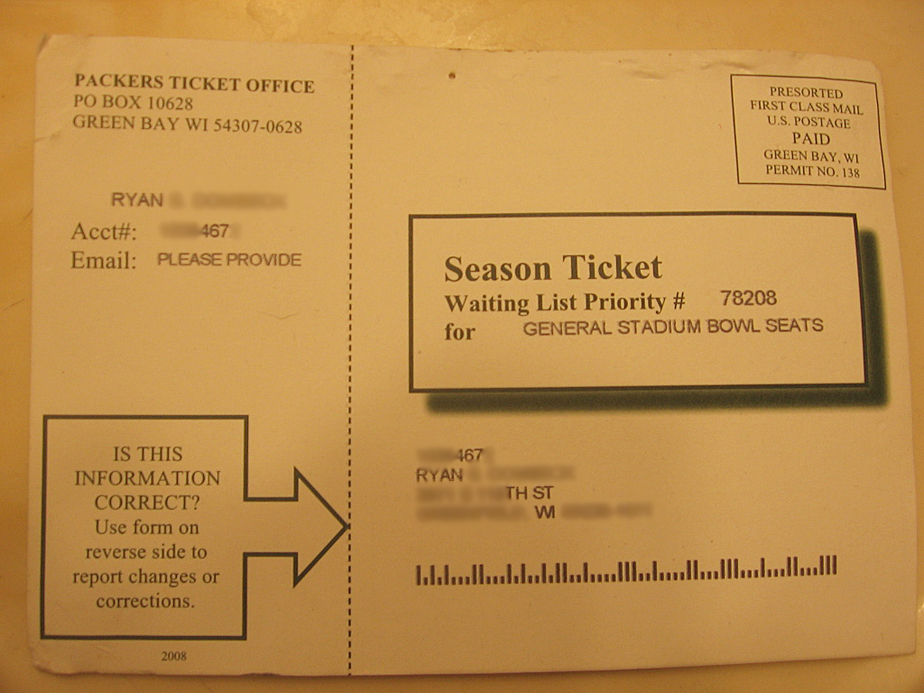
Annual postcard sent out by the organization to those currently on the waiting list for season tickets

The Packers have an exceptionally loyal fan base. Regardless of team performance, every game played in Green Bay—preseason, regular season, and playoffs—has been sold out since 1960. Despite the Packers having by far the smallest local TV market, the team consistently ranks as one of the most popular in the NFL. They also have one of the longest season ticket waiting lists in professional sports: 140,000 names long, more than there are seats at Lambeau Field. The average wait is said to be over 30 years, but with only 90 or so tickets turned over annually it would be 955 years before the newest name on the list got theirs. As a result, season tickets are willed to next of kin, and newborns are placed optimistically on the waiting list.

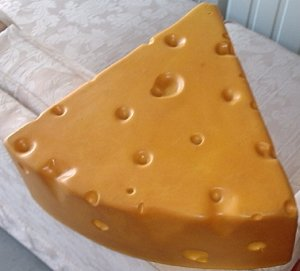
A cheesehead hat, commonly worn by Packer fans

Packers fans are often referred to as cheeseheads, a nickname for Wisconsin residents reflecting the state's bountiful cheese production first leveled as an insult at a 1987 game between the Chicago White Sox and Milwaukee Brewers. Instead, it came to be a statewide source of pride, and particularly since 1994 has been embraced by Packers fans. Bright orange triangular cheesehead hats are a fixture wherever the team plays.

During training camp in the summer months, held outside the Don Hutson Center, young Packers fans can bring their bikes and have their favorite players ride them from the locker room to practice at Ray Nitschke Field. This old tradition began around the time of Lambeau Field's construction in 1957. Gary Knafelc, a Packers end at the time, said, "I think it was just that kids wanted us to ride their bikes. I can remember kids saying, 'Hey, ride my bike.'"

The team holds an annual scrimmage called Family Night, typically an intra-squad affair, at Lambeau Field. During 2004 and 2005 sellout crowds of over 60,000 fans showed up, with an all-time mark of 62,492 set in 2005 when the Buffalo Bills appeared.

In August 2008, ESPN.com ranked Packers fans as second-best in the NFL. The team initially finished tied with the Pittsburgh Steelers (who finished ahead of the Packers) as having the best fans, but the tie was broken by ESPN's own John Clayton, a Pittsburgh native.

== Branding ==
=== Nickname ===
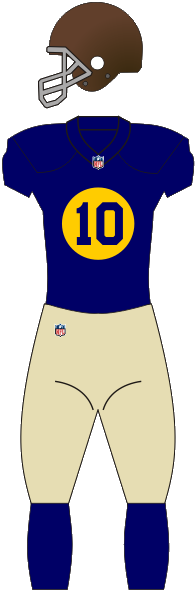
The Packers' first alternate uniform, a throwback first introduced in 2010

Needing to outfit his new squad, team founder Curly Lambeau solicited funds from his employer, the Indian Packing Company. He was given $500 for uniforms and equipment in return for the team being named for its sponsor. An early newspaper article referred to the fledglings as "the Indians", but by the time they played their first game "Packers" had taken hold.

Indian Packing was purchased in 1920 by the Acme Packing Company. Acme continued to support the team, which played its first NFL season with "ACME PACKERS" emblazoned on its jerseys.

=== Team colors ===
Lambeau, a Notre Dame alumnus, borrowed its Irish's navy blue and gold team colors, much as George Halas borrowed his Illinois alma mater's for the Chicago Bears. As a result, the early Packers were often referred to as the "Bays" or the "Blues" (and even occasionally as "the Big Bay Blues").

By 1950, Green Bay replaced navy blue with kelly green but kept what was by then a lighter shade of athletic gold. Navy blue was kept as a secondary color, seen primarily on sideline capes, but was quietly dropped on all official materials shortly after that. In 1958, this kelly green was replaced by a darker hunter green; it and athletic gold have served as the team colors since. The team's current uniform combination of forest green or white jerseys and metallic gold pants was adopted soon after Vince Lombardi arrived in 1959. However, to celebrate the NFL's 75th anniversary in 1994, the Packers joined in a league-wide donning of "throwback" jerseys, back to navy blue and gold. The team would go throwback again for two Thanksgiving Day games against the Detroit Lions, in blue and gold 1930s-era uniforms in 2001, and 1960s green and gold (only slightly different from the current ones) in 2003.

=== Logo ===
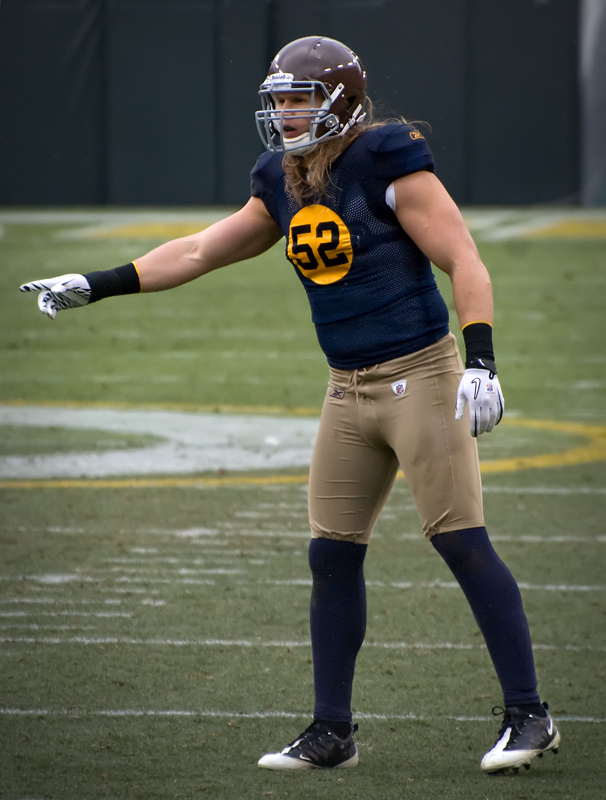
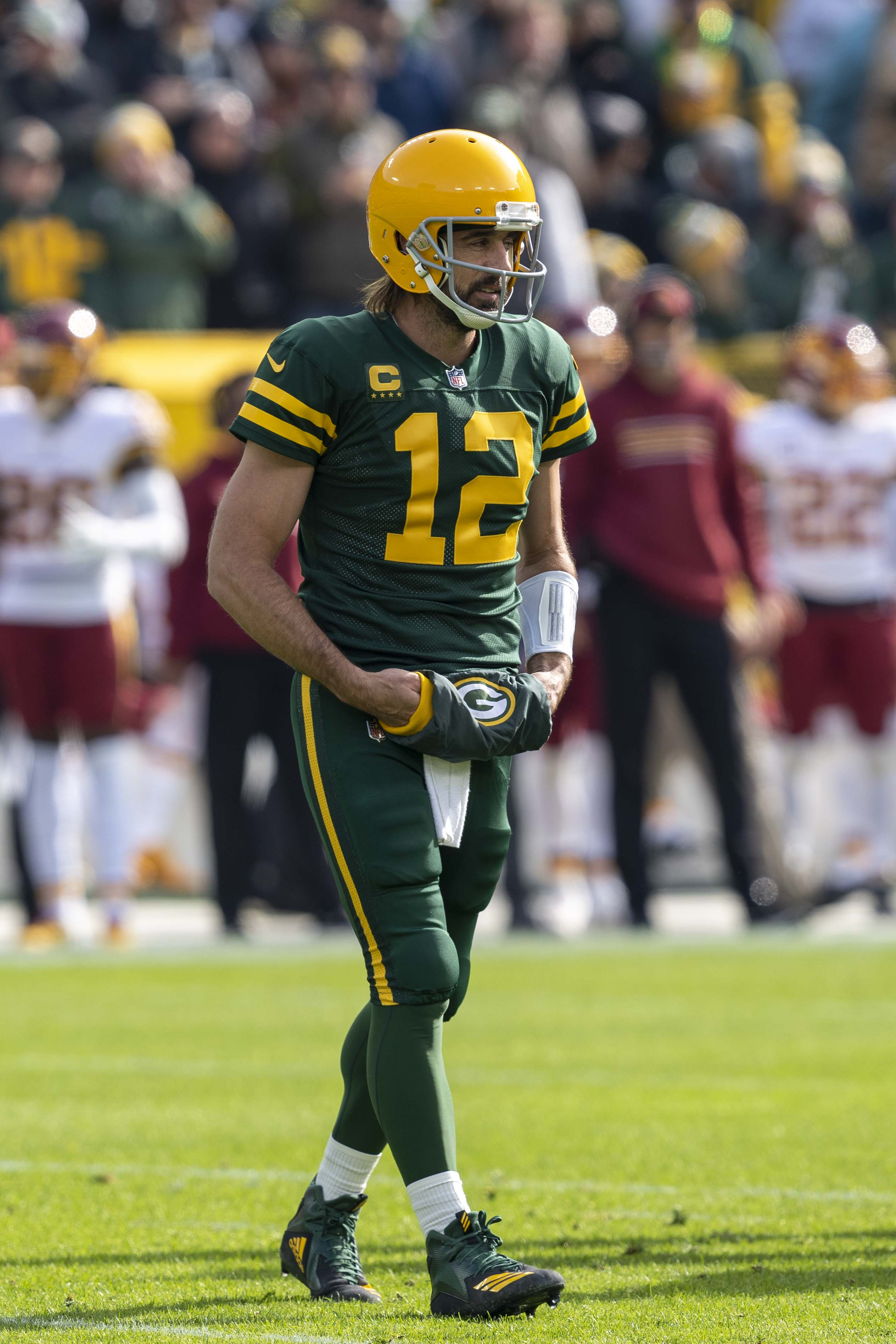
(Left) Clay Matthews III in the Packers' 2010–14 throwback navy blue uniform based on the 1929 Acme Packers; (Right) Aaron Rodgers in the Packers' 2021–24 throwback all-green uniform based on the 1950s set.

In 1951, the team finally stopped wearing leather helmets, adopting the metallic gold plastic headgear it has used ever since. The oval "G" logo was added in 1961 when Lombardi asked Packers equipment manager Gerald "Dad" Braisher to design a logo. Braisher tasked his assistant, St. Norbert College art student John Gordon. Satisfied with a football-shaped letter "G", the pair presented it to Lombardi, who then approved the addition. Tiki Barber falsely reported it to stand for "greatness" without a reliable source to back up his claims. Other reputable media outlets then published similar stories using Barber's false claim as a source. The Packers' Assistant Director of PR and Corporate Communications had the following to say: "There's nothing in our history that suggests there's any truth to this. The Packers Hall of Fame archivist said the same thing." The team used several different logos before 1961, but the "G" is the only logo that has ever appeared on the helmet. The Packers hold the trademark on the "G" logo, and have granted limited permission to other organizations to utilize a similar logo, such as the University of Georgia and Grambling State University, in addition to the city of Green Bay itself as part of its civic logo. Adopted in 1964, the Georgia "G", though different in design and color, was similar to the Packers' "G". Then-Georgia head coach Vince Dooley thought it best to clear the use of Georgia's new emblem with the Packers.

=== Uniform variation ===
While several NFL teams choose to wear white jerseys at home early in the season due to white's ability to reflect late summer sun rays, the Packers have done so only twice, during the opening two games of the 1989 season. In 2016, the Packers debuted their Color Rush uniform, wearing white pants and socks with a white uniform. This set has been worn five times, four of them at home and two against the Chicago Bears. In 2024, the all-white Color Rush uniform would be paired with a new alternate white helmet, which is essentially the primary helmet minus the gold elements. Although alternate gold jerseys with green numbers are sold on a retail basis, the team currently has no plans to introduce such a jersey to be used in actual games.

During the 2010 season, the Packers paid tribute to their historical roots with a throwback jersey modeled after that worn by the club in 1929, during its first championship season. The jersey was navy blue with a gold circle and navy numbers, again making the Packers "the Blues". These were then changed in 2015 to the navy blue throwback worn from 1937 to 1949, featuring gold shoulders and numbers. In 2021, the Packers changed their throwback thirds to an all-green design, resembling the uniforms worn from 1950 to 1953. Originally, the Packers wore brown helmets with the throwbacks, but in 2013, they started wearing their gold helmets without any decals due to the then-implementation of the NFL's one-shell rule; this rule has been abolished in 2022. As a result, they changed their throwbacks in both 2015 and 2021 to properly recreate those original uniforms, which had gold helmets with them. In 2025, the Packers unveiled a 1923 throwback navy blue uniform with dark gold numbers, tan pants and navy socks, featuring a special alternate helmet that was meticulously hand-painted to simulate the leather helmets of the era. The helmets would be equipped with navy blue facemasks.

The Packers introduced a "Rivalries" uniform in 2026, which they would use once per season against each of their NFC North opponents. Celebrating its status as the only North American professional sports franchise to be owned by a community of fans, the "Rivalries" uniform is vintage green with alabaster and gold stripes, complete with alabaster pants and matte helmet. An interlocking "GB" logo, echoing the team's Vince Lombardi-era gear, was added on the chest. The overall design was based on aged paper of historic Packers stock certificates and vintage letters found on paper currency.

The Packers' uniform manufacturer is Berlin-based Ripon Athletic, who has manufactured the team's uniforms since the 1960s. Upon the NFL's switch of uniform suppliers in 2012 to Nike from Reebok, the Packers refused any changes to their uniform in any way outside of the required supplier's logo and new league uniform logos, declining all of Nike's "Elite 51" enhancements, including retaining the traditional striped collar of the jersey rather than Nike's new collar design. However, in 2025, the Packers' new 1923 throwback uniform became the first to adopt Nike's "Vapor FUSE" template.

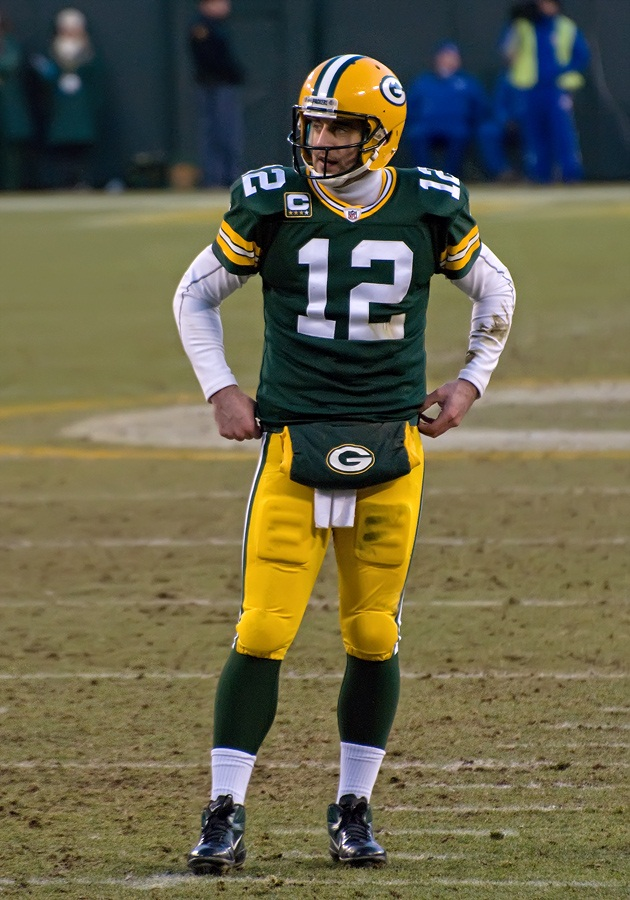
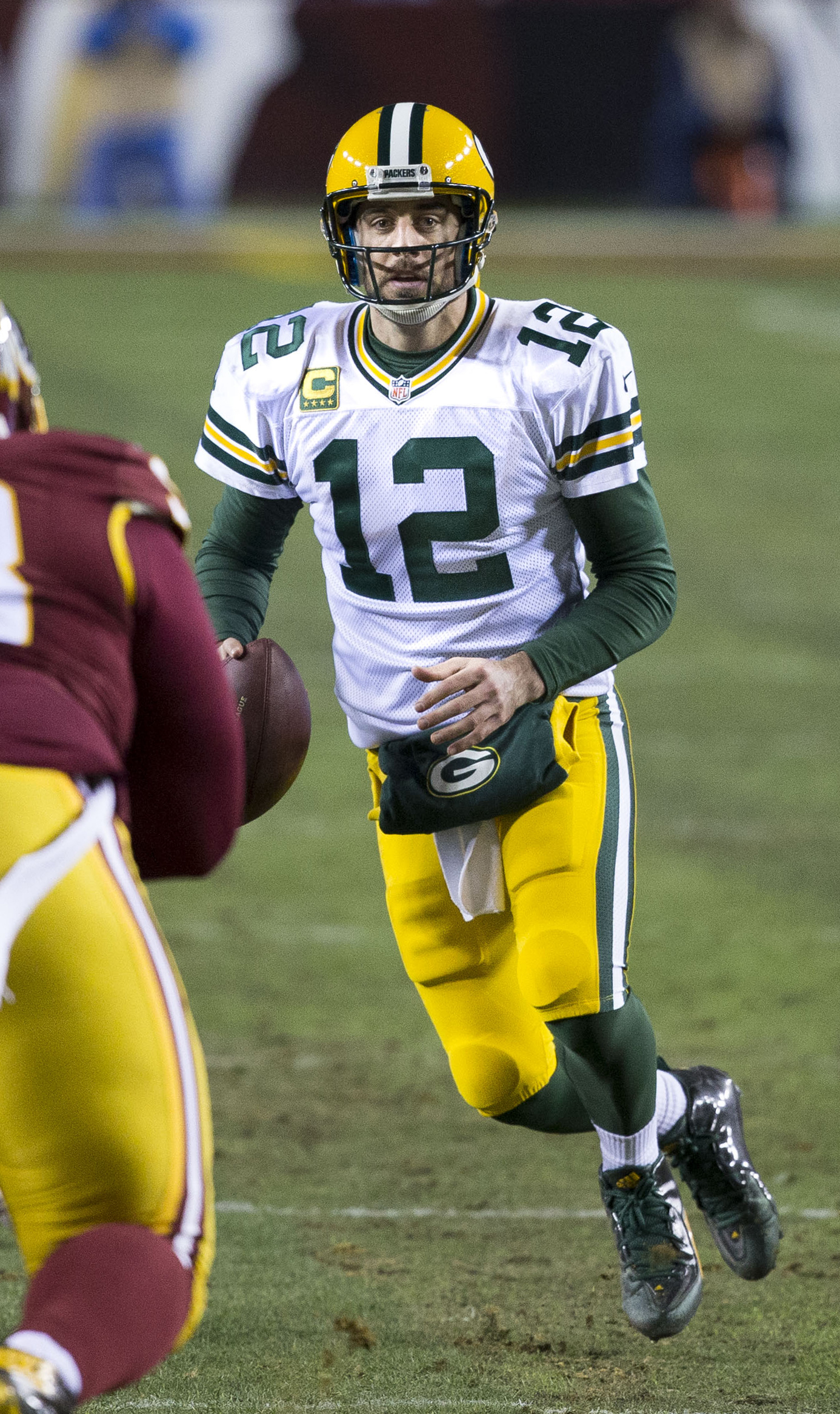
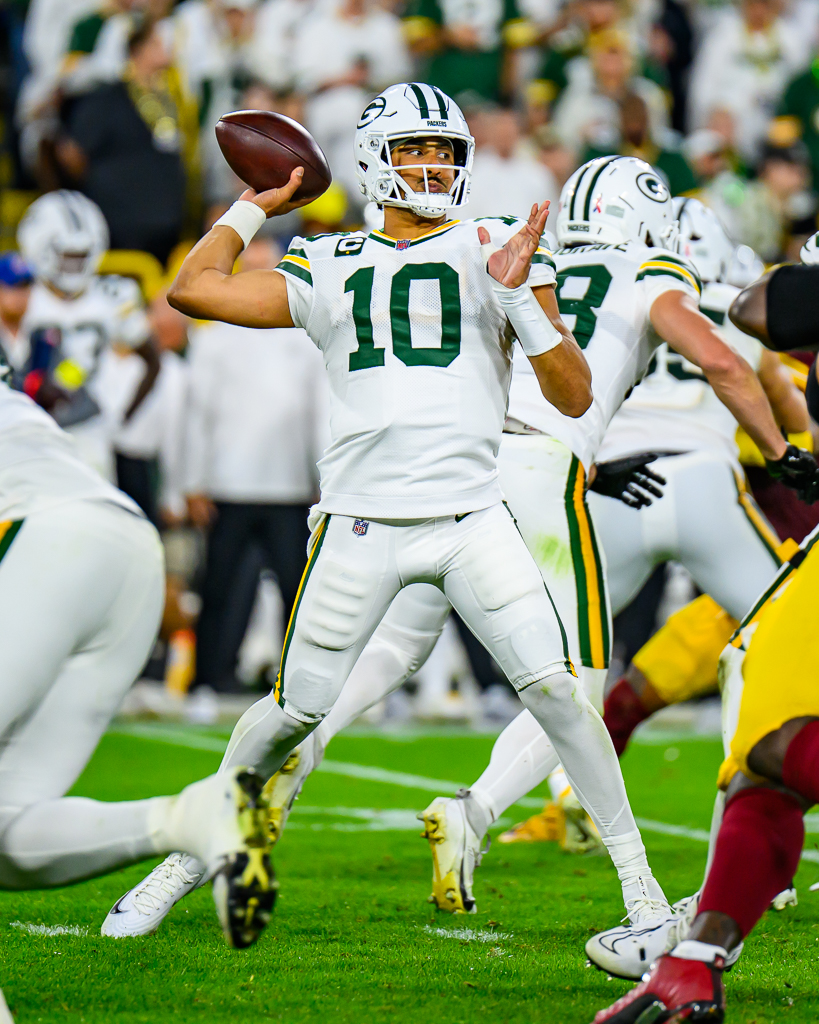
(Left) Aaron Rodgers in the Packers' home green uniform; (Center) Aaron Rodgers in the Packers' road white uniform; (Right) Jordan Love in the Packers' all-white "Color Rush" uniform.

== Rivalries ==
=== Divisional ===
==== Chicago Bears ====
The Packers and Chicago Bears have been rivals since their team's inception in 1920, becoming one of the oldest and most storied rivalries in the league's history. The Packers currently lead the series 109–98–6, and the teams have met thrice in the postseason. The Bears won the 1941 meeting, 33–14, and eventually defeated the New York Giants in the 1941 NFL Championship Game, and the Packers won the 2011 meeting, 21–14, en route to a Super Bowl XLV win over the Pittsburgh Steelers. The Bears defeated the Packers in the 2026 meeting, 31–27, on the way to an NFC Divisional Game loss to the Los Angeles Rams. The teams' first meeting was a victory for the Bears (known as the Staleys at the time) in 1921 in a shutout, 20–0. The Packers claimed their first win over the Bears in 1925, 14–10. The 1924 matchup (which ended in a 3–0 win for Chicago) was notable for featuring the first-ever ejection of players in a game in NFL history, as Frank Hanny of the Bears and Walter Voss of the Packers were ejected for punching each other. The rivalry also featured one of the last successful fair catch kicks in 1968, when Bears kicker Mac Percival kicked the game-winning field goal. As of the 2024 season, the Packers lead the all-time series 108–96–6.

==== Minnesota Vikings ====
The rivalry between the Packers and Minnesota Vikings began in 1961, similar to their other divisional rivalries. It is also considered to be one of the most intense rivalries in the NFL, due to the intensity of most of the matchups over the years, As is the case with many of their respective state's college teams sharing a rivalry; (Minnesota and Wisconsin) have a rivalry in multiple sports, seen between the Big Ten rivals, the University of Wisconsin and University of Minnesota. Events such as Randy Moss mooning the Green Bay crowd in the first playoff game between these two teams (won by the Vikings), and former Packer great Brett Favre's move to the Vikings have created more resentment between these teams. The Packers lead the all-time series 67–61–3, despite the two teams splitting their two playoff contests.

==== Detroit Lions ====
The Packers' rivalry with the Detroit Lions has been another one of the oldest regular matchups in the NFL. They first met in 1929 when the Lions, originally based in Portsmouth, Ohio and known as the Portsmouth Spartans, were an independent team prior to joining the NFL the following season. The team eventually moved to Detroit for the 1934 season. The Lions and Packers have been division rivals since 1933 and have always met at least twice a season since 1932, without any canceled games between both rivals. The Packers lead the series 108–78–7 as of the 2026 season, the first time in NFL history that a team has recorded 100 wins over an opponent.

=== Conference ===
==== Dallas Cowboys ====
The rivalry between the Packers and Dallas Cowboys has resulted in several notable games in league history, including the "Ice Bowl" and other games impacting the playoff race. The rivalry heated up during the 2010s, with several of their games impacting the NFC playoff race during that decade. During the Brett Favre era in Green Bay, the Cowboys dominated the rivalry, going 9–2 (including 9–0 in Dallas) against the Packers when Favre was the quarterback. However, in the Aaron Rodgers era from 2008 to 2022, the Packers have dominated the rivalry, as Rodgers had an 8–2 record against the Cowboys with Green Bay, including a perfect 3–0 record in Dallas. The Packers lead the all-time series 22–17–1. The Packers lead 5–4 in the playoffs, with the last playoff match taking place in January 2024 at AT&T Stadium in the Wild Card round with a 48–32 Packers win.

==== San Francisco 49ers ====
The rivalry between the Packers and the San Francisco 49ers ignited during the 1990s, with the two teams facing each other in four consecutive playoff games. The Packers won four of five playoff games against the 49ers with Brett Favre as its quarterback, with four of those games pitting Favre against the 49ers' Hall of Fame quarterback Steve Young. Since 2012, the 49ers have defeated the Aaron Rodgers-led Packers four times in the playoffs. The Packers currently lead the series 39–34–1, but the 49ers have won the last four postseason meetings to take a 6–4 lead.

==== Seattle Seahawks ====
Following Seattle's relocation to the NFC in 2002, the Packers have faced the Seattle Seahawks multiple times in the playoffs, developing an intense rivalry as well. Some notable moments include the clubs' first playoff meeting in 2003 in which Seahawks quarterback Matt Hasselbeck threw a game-losing pick-six in overtime after guaranteeing a game-winning drive, the Fail Mary, and Russell Wilson overcoming four interceptions and a 16–0 Packers lead to lead Seattle to a 28–22 overtime win to advance to Super Bowl XLIX. As of the 2026 season, the Packers lead the all-time series 16–9.

==== New York Giants ====
The series between the Packers and New York Giants has been one of the oldest regular matchups in the league as the two teams first met in 1928. The two teams have played since 1970 in the National Football Conference, and they play each other in the regular season either every three years or depending on its NFC division placement, and in the postseason, The Packers lead the all-time series 35–28–2 and postseason series 5–3.

==== Tampa Bay Buccaneers ====
The Tampa Bay Buccaneers and Packers were division rivals from 1977 to 2002 when both were in the NFC Central division. The teams have played several notable games, including a Snow Bowl game in 1985, a playoff game in 1998 and the NFC Championship Game in 2021. As of the 2026 season, the Packers lead the series 34–24–1.

== Stadium history ==
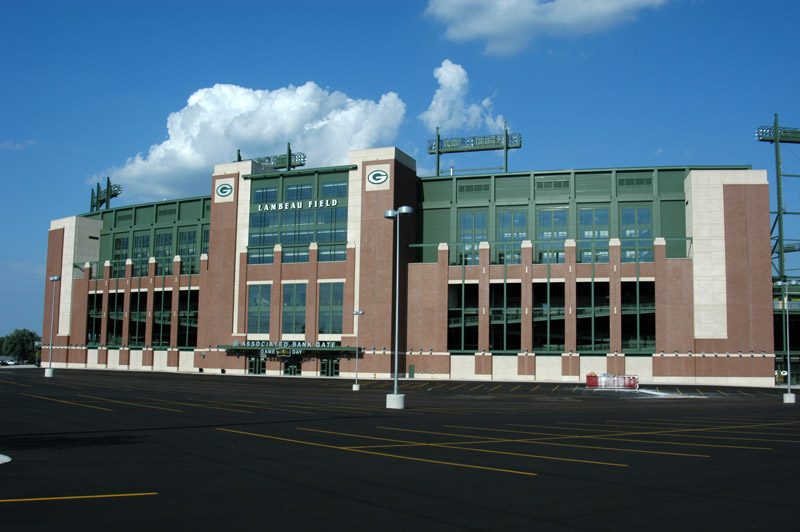
Lambeau Field after its 2003 renovation

After their early seasons at Bellevue Park and Hagemeister Park, the Packers played home games in City Stadium from 1925 to 1956. The team won its first six NFL championships there.

By the 1950s, the wooden 25,000-seat arena was considered outmoded. The NFL threatened to move the franchise to Milwaukee full-time unless it got a better stadium. The city responded by building a new 32,150 seat City Stadium for the team, the first built exclusively for an NFL team, which opened in time for the 1957 season. It was renamed Lambeau Field in 1965 to honor Curly Lambeau, who had died earlier in the year.

Expanded seven times before the end of the 1990s, Lambeau Field capacity reached 60,890. In 2003, it was extensively renovated to expand seating, modernize stadium facilities, and add an atrium area. Even with a current seating capacity of 72,928, ticket demand far outpaces supply, as all Packers games have been sold out since 1960. About 86,000 names are on the waiting list for season tickets.

The Packers played part of their home slate in Milwaukee starting in 1933, including two to three home games each year in Milwaukee's County Stadium from 1953 to 1994. Indeed, County Stadium had been built partly to entice the Packers to move to Milwaukee full-time. The Packers worked to capture their growing fan base in Milwaukee and the larger crowds. By the 1960s, the threat of an American Football League franchise in Milwaukee prompted the Packers to stay, including scheduling a Western Conference Championship game in 1967.

County Stadium was built primarily as a baseball stadium and made only the bare minimum adjustments to accommodate football. At its height, it only seated 56,000 people, just barely above the NFL minimum; many of those seats were badly obstructed. The field was just barely large enough to fit a football field. Both teams shared the same sideline (separated by a piece of tape) and the end zones extended onto the warning track. By 1994, improvements and seating expansions at Lambeau, along with the Brewers preparing to campaign for their new stadium prompted the Packers to play their full slate in Green Bay for the first time in 62 years. Former season ticketholders for the Milwaukee package continue to receive preference for one pre-season and the second and fifth regular-season games at Lambeau Field each season, along with playoff games through a lottery under the "Gold Package" plan.

The Packers have three practice facilities across the street from Lambeau Field in Ashwaubenon, Wisconsin: the Don Hutson Center, an indoor facility; Ray Nitschke Field, an outdoor field with artificial FieldTurf; and Clarke Hinkle Field, an outdoor field with natural grass.

The Packers Pro Shop has been the official retail store of the Packers since 1989. The primary retail store is located at Lambeau Field, having been expanded numerous times since it opened. The Pro Shop reported sales of over $7 million in 2015.

== Statistics and records ==
=== Season-by-season results ===
This is a partial list of the Packers' last five completed seasons. For the full season-by-season franchise results, see List of Green Bay Packers seasons.

Note: The finish, wins, losses, and ties columns list regular season results and exclude any postseason play.

Super Bowl champions	Conference champions	Division champions	Wild Card berth

As of January 2026

Season	Team	League	Conference	Division	Regular season				Postseason results	Awards
Season	Team	League	Conference	Division	Finish	Wins	Losses	Ties	Postseason results	Awards
2021	2021	NFL	NFC	North	1st	13	4	0	Lost Divisional Playoffs (49ers) 13–10	—
2022	2022	NFL	NFC	North	3rd	8	9	0	—	—
2023	2023	NFL	NFC	North	2nd	9	8	0	Won Wild-Card Playoffs (at Cowboys) 48–32; Lost Divisional Playoffs (at 49ers) 21–24	—
2024	2024	NFL	NFC	North	3rd	11	6	0	Lost Wild-Card Playoffs (at Eagles) 10–22	—
2025	2025	NFL	NFC	North	2nd	9	7	1	Lost Wild-Card Playoffs (at Bears) 27–31	—

=== Records ===
All-Time Packers leaders
Leader	Player	Record Number	Years on Packers
Passing	Brett Favre	61,655 passing yards	1992–2007
Rushing	Ahman Green	8,322 rushing yards	2000–2006; 2009
Receiving	Donald Driver	10,137 receiving yards	1999–2012
Coaching wins	Curly Lambeau	209 wins	1919–1949

=== Playoff record ===
Year	Game	Opponent	Result
1936	NFL Championship	Boston Braves	W 21–6
1938	NFL Championship	New York Giants	L 17–23
1939	NFL Championship	New York Giants	W 27–0
1941	Western Division Championship	Chicago Bears	L 14–33
1944	NFL Championship	New York Giants	W 14–7
1960	NFL Championship	Philadelphia Eagles	L 13–17
1961	NFL Championship	New York Giants	W 37–0
1962	NFL Championship	New York Giants	W 16–7
1965	Western Conference Championship	Baltimore Colts	W 13–10 (OT)
1965	NFL Championship	Cleveland Browns	W 23–12
1966	NFL Championship	Dallas Cowboys	W 34–27
1966	Super Bowl I	Kansas City Chiefs	W 35–10
1967	Conference Championship	Los Angeles Rams	W 28–7
1967	NFL Championship	Dallas Cowboys	W 21–17
1967	Super Bowl II	Oakland Raiders	W 33–14
1972	Divisional Round	Washington Redskins	L 3–16
1982	First Round	St. Louis Cardinals	W 41–16
1982	Second Round	Dallas Cowboys	L 26–37
1993	Wild Card	Detroit Lions	W 28–24
1993	Divisional Round	Dallas Cowboys	L 17–27
1994	Wild Card	Detroit Lions	W 16–12
1994	Divisional Round	Dallas Cowboys	L 9–35
1995	Wild Card	Atlanta Falcons	W 37–20
1995	Divisional Round	San Francisco 49ers	W 27–17
1995	NFC Championship	Dallas Cowboys	L 27–38
1996	Divisional Round	San Francisco 49ers	W 35–14
1996	NFC Championship	Carolina Panthers	W 30–13
1996	Super Bowl XXXI	New England Patriots	W 35–21
1997	Divisional Round	Tampa Bay Buccaneers	W 21–7
1997	NFC Championship	San Francisco 49ers	W 23–10
1997	Super Bowl XXXII	Denver Broncos	L 24–31
1998	Wild Card	San Francisco 49ers	L 27–30
2001	NFC Wild Card	San Francisco 49ers	W 15–25
2001	Divisional Round	St. Louis Rams	L 17–45
2002	NFC Wild Card	Atlanta Falcons	L 7–27
2003	NFC Wild Card	Seattle Seahawks	W 33–27 (OT)
2003	Divisional Round	Philadelphia Eagles	L 17–20 (OT)
2004	NFC Wild Card	Minnesota Vikings	L 17–31
2007	Divisional Round	Seattle Seahawks	W 42–20
2007	NFC Championship	New York Giants	L 20–23 (OT)
2009	NFC Wild Card	Arizona Cardinals	L 45–51 (OT)
2010	NFC Wild Card	Philadelphia Eagles	W 21–16
2010	Divisional Round	Atlanta Falcons	W 48–21
2010	NFC Championship	Chicago Bears	W 21–14
2010	Super Bowl XLV	Pittsburgh Steelers	W 31–25
2011	Divisional Round	New York Giants	L 20–37
2012	NFC Wild Card	Minnesota Vikings	W 24–10
2012	Divisional Round	San Francisco 49ers	L 31–45
2013	NFC Wild Card	San Francisco 49ers	L 20–23
2014	Divisional Round	Dallas Cowboys	W 26–21
2014	NFC Championship	Seattle Seahawks	L 22–28 (OT)
2015	NFC Wild Card	Washington Redskins	W 35–18
2015	Divisional Round	Arizona Cardinals	L 20–26 (OT)
2016	NFC Wild Card	New York Giants	W 38–13
2016	Divisional Round	Dallas Cowboys	W 34–31
2016	NFC Championship	Atlanta Falcons	L 21–44
2019	Divisional Round	Seattle Seahawks	W 28–23
2019	NFC Championship	San Francisco 49ers	L 20–37
2020	Divisional Round	Los Angeles Rams	W 32–18
2020	NFC Championship	Tampa Bay Buccaneers	L 26–31
2021	Divisional Round	San Francisco 49ers	L 10–13
2023	NFC Wild Card	Dallas Cowboys	W 48–32
2023	Divisional Round	San Francisco 49ers	L 21–24
2024	NFC Wild Card	Philadelphia Eagles	L 10–22
2025	NFC Wild Card	Chicago Bears	L 27–31
Overall Playoff Record: 37–28

== Championships ==
The Packers have been league champions a record 13 times, topping their nearest rival, the Chicago Bears, by four. The first three were decided by league standing, the next six by the NFL Title Game, and the last four by Super Bowl victories. The Packers are also the only team to win three consecutive NFL titles, having accomplished this twice—from 1929 to 1931 under Lambeau, and from 1965 to 1967 under Lombardi.

=== Super Bowl championships ===
Starting in 1966, the NFL began holding the Super Bowl. The Packers have won four Super Bowls.

Year	Coach	Super Bowl	Location	Opponent	Score	Record
1966	Vince Lombardi	I	Los Angeles Memorial Coliseum (Los Angeles)	Kansas City Chiefs	35–10	12–2
1967	Vince Lombardi	II	Orange Bowl (Miami)	Oakland Raiders	33–14	9–4–1
1996	Mike Holmgren	XXXI	Louisiana Superdome (New Orleans)	New England Patriots	35–21	13–3
2010	Mike McCarthy	XLV	Cowboys Stadium (Arlington, Texas)	Pittsburgh Steelers	31–25	10–6
Total Super Bowls won: 4

=== NFL championships (pre Super Bowl era) ===
From 1933 to 1969, the NFL held a championship game to decide their champion. The Packers won 8 NFL Championship Games. From 1966 to 1969, the NFL Championship Game was followed by the Super Bowl.

Year	Coach	Location	Opponent	Score	Record
1936	Curly Lambeau	Polo Grounds (New York)	Boston Redskins	21–6	10–1–1
1939	Curly Lambeau	Dairy Bowl (West Allis, Wisconsin)	New York Giants	27–0	9–2
1944	Curly Lambeau	Polo Grounds (New York)	New York Giants	14–7	8–2
1961	Vince Lombardi	New City Stadium (Green Bay)	New York Giants	37–0	11–3
1962	Vince Lombardi	Yankee Stadium (New York)	New York Giants	16–7	13–1
1965	Vince Lombardi	Lambeau Field (Green Bay)	Cleveland Browns	23–12	10–3–1
1966	Vince Lombardi	Cotton Bowl (Dallas)	Dallas Cowboys	34–27	12–2
1967	Vince Lombardi	Lambeau Field (Green Bay)	Dallas Cowboys	21–17	9–4–1
Total NFL championships won: 8

=== NFC championships ===
The Packers have won three NFC Championship Games, with twice as many losses. NFC Championships did not exist before the AFL–NFL merger in 1970.

Year	Coach	Location	Opponent	Score	Record
1996	Mike Holmgren	Lambeau Field (Green Bay)	Carolina Panthers	30–13	13–3
1997	Mike Holmgren	3Com Park (San Francisco)	San Francisco 49ers	23–10	13–3
2010	Mike McCarthy	Soldier Field (Chicago)	Chicago Bears	21–14	10–6
Total NFC Championships won: 3

=== NFL championship by standings ===
From 1920 to 1932, the NFL championship was awarded based on standings, with no championship game taking place. The Packers won three such championships.

Year	Coach	Record
1929	Curly Lambeau	12–0–1
1930	Curly Lambeau	10–3–1
1931	Curly Lambeau	12–2
Total NFL championships by best record: 3

=== Division Championships ===
The Packers have won 21 divisional championships.

Year	Coach	Division	Record
1936	Curly Lambeau	NFL West	10–1–1
1938	Curly Lambeau	NFL West	8–3
1939	Curly Lambeau	NFL West	9–2
1944	Curly Lambeau	NFL West	8–2
1967	Vince Lombardi	NFL Central	9–4–1
1972	Dan Devine	NFC Central	10–4
1995	Mike Holmgren	NFC Central	11–5
1996	Mike Holmgren	NFC Central	13–3
1997	Mike Holmgren	NFC Central	13–3
2002	Mike Sherman	NFC North	12–4
2003	Mike Sherman	NFC North	12–4
2004	Mike Sherman	NFC North	10–6
2007	Mike McCarthy	NFC North	13–3
2011	Mike McCarthy	NFC North	15–1
2012	Mike McCarthy	NFC North	11–5
2013	Mike McCarthy	NFC North	8–7–1
2014	Mike McCarthy	NFC North	12–4
2016	Mike McCarthy	NFC North	10–6
2019	Matt LaFleur	NFC North	13–3
2020	Matt LaFleur	NFC North	13–3
2021	Matt LaFleur	NFC North	13–4
Total NFC Divisional Championships won: 21

== Notable players ==
=== Current roster ===
Green Bay Packers roster
Quarterbacks (QB): 10 Jordan Love; 6 Tyrod Taylor; Running backs (RB): 30 Chris Brooks; 8 Josh Jacobs; 26 Kaleb Johnson; 32 MarShawn Lloyd; 22 Pierre Strong Jr.; Wide receivers (WR): 0 Matthew Golden; 16 Bo Melton; 23 Skyy Moore; 87 J. Michael Sturdivant; 9 Christian Watson; 83 Savion Williams; Tight ends (TE): 85 Tucker Kraft; 86 Mark Redman; 18 Jonnu Smith	Offensive linemen (OL): 65 Aaron Banks G; 74 Mekhi Becton T; 71 Anthony Belton T; 52 Jager Burton G; 79 Travis Glover G; 67 Donovan Jennings G; 77 Jordan Morgan T; 75 Sean Rhyan C; 72 Laken Tomlinson G; 73 John Williams C; 70 Kevin Zeitler G; Defensive linemen (DL): 94 Karl Brooks DT; 93 Anthony Campbell DT; 57 Brenton Cox Jr. ED; 51 Dani Dennis-Sutton ED; 55 Chris McClellan DT; 97 Jordon Riley DT; 99 Barryn Sorrell ED; 90 Lukas Van Ness ED; 95 Devonte Wyatt DT	Linebackers (LB): 44 Zaire Franklin; 59 Ty'Ron Hopper; 58 Isaiah McDuffie; 31 Nick Niemann; 54 Kristian Welch; Defensive backs (DB): 7 Javon Bullard S; 2 Brandon Cisse CB; 36 Kamal Hadden CB; 29 Xavier McKinney S; 25 Keisean Nixon CB; 27 Kitan Oladapo S; 21 Benjamin St-Juste CB; 24 Carrington Valentine CB; 33 Evan Williams S; Special teams (ST): 42 Matthew Orzech LS; 28 Trey Smack K; 19 Daniel Whelan P	Practice squad: 78 Dalton Cooper T; 39 Elijah Culp CB; 49 Drake Dabney TE; 48 Jack Dingle LB; 43 Kenny Fletcher Jr. TE; 20 Domani Jackson CB; 46 D. J. Johnson ED; 47 Nyjalik Kelly ED; 17 Cam Miller QB; 53 Arron Mosby ED; 64 Haggai Ndubuisi DT (IPP); 80 Isaiah Neyor WR; 13 Coleman Owen WR; 35 John Saunders Jr. S; 82 Quincy Skinner Jr. WR; 63 Mazi Smith DT; 68 Dillon Wade G; Reserve: 50 Zach Bako-Bewele T (IR); 91 Warren Brinson DT (IR); 56 Edgerrin Cooper LB (IR); 96 Jonathan Ford DT (IR); 98 Javon Hargrave DT (IR); 62 Jacob Monk G (IR); 88 Luke Musgrave TE (PUP); 45 Collin Oliver ED (IR/DFR); 1 Micah Parsons ED (PUP); 11 Jayden Reed WR (IR); 81 Josh Whyle TE (IR) 53 active, 16 practice squad (1 IPP), 11 reserve As of November 17, 2026. Rookies in italics.; Roster; Depth chart; Transactions

=== Pro Football Hall of Fame members ===
The Packers have the second most members in the Pro Football Hall of Fame with 30, 25 of which were inducted as Packers. They trail only the Chicago Bears with 41 Hall of Famers, 32 of which were inducted as Bears.

Green Bay Packers Pro Football Hall of Famers
Players
No.	Name	Positions	Seasons	Inducted	No.	Name	Positions	Seasons	Inducted
26	Herb Adderley	CB	1961–1969	1980	64	Jerry Kramer	G	1958–1968	2018
36	LeRoy Butler	S	1990–2001	2022	20	Earl (Curly) Lambeau	HB; Coach	1919–1929; 1930–1949	1963
3	Tony Canadeo	HB	1941–1944; 1946–1952	1974	80	James Lofton	WR	1978–1986	2003
87	Willie Davis	DE	1960–1969	1981	24	Johnny Blood	HB	1929–1933; 1935–1936	1963
44	Bobby Dillon	S	1952–1959	2020	2	Mike Michalske	OG	1929–1935; 1937	1964
4	Brett Favre	QB	1992–2007	2016	66	Ray Nitschke	LB	1958–1972	1978
75	Forrest Gregg	OT	1956; 1958–1970	1977	51	Jim Ringo	C	1953–1963	1981
56	Ted Hendricks	LB	1974	1990	89	Dave Robinson	LB	1963–1972	2013
38	Arnie Herber	QB	1930–1940	1966	84	Sterling Sharpe	WR	1988–1994	2025
30	Clarke Hinkle	FB	1932–1941	1964	15	Bart Starr	QB	1956–1971	1977
5	Paul Hornung	HB	1956–1962; 1964–1966	1986	31	Jim Taylor	FB	1958–1966	1976
36	Cal Hubbard	OT	1929–1933; 1935	1963	92	Reggie White	DE	1993–1998	2006
14	Don Hutson	E	1935–1945	1963	24	Willie Wood	S	1960–1971	1989
74	Henry Jordan	DT	1959–1969	1995	21	Charles Woodson	CB	2006–2012	2021
Coaches and Executives
Name		Positions			Seasons			Inducted	
Vince Lombardi		Coach			1959–1967			1971	
Ron Wolf		General manager			1991–2001			2015	

=== Wisconsin Athletic Hall of Fame ===
Many Packers players and coaches are also enshrined in the Wisconsin Athletic Hall of Fame. In 2018 Ron Wolf, the most recent Packers contributor to be honored, was inducted.

=== Retired numbers ===
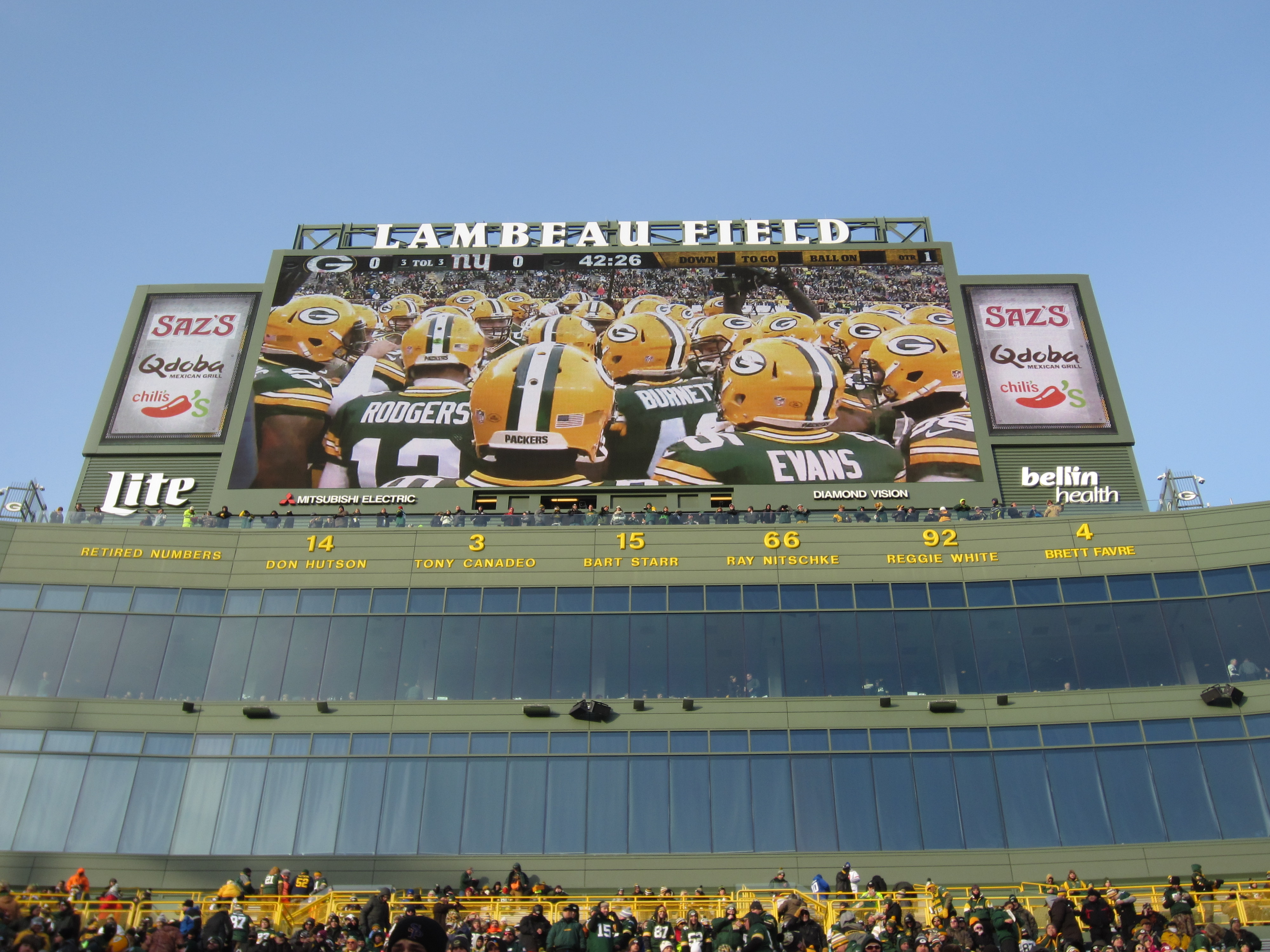
Lambeau Field's north end zone with the six retired numbers

In nearly nine decades of Packers football, the Packers have formally retired six numbers. All six Packers are members of the Pro Football Hall of Fame and their numbers and names are displayed on the green facade of Lambeau Field's north endzone as well as in the Lambeau Field Atrium.

Tony Canadeo; HB, 1941–1944, 1946–1952; Retired 1952	Brett Favre; QB, 1992–2007; Retired 2015	Don Hutson; WR, 1935–1945; Retired 1951	Bart Starr; QB, 1956–71; Retired 1973	Ray Nitschke; LB, 1958–1972; Retired 1983	Reggie White; DE, 1993–1998; Retired 2005

=== Green Bay Packers Hall of Fame ===
The Green Bay Packers Hall of Fame was the first hall of fame built to honor a single professional American football team. John P. Holloway, a Brown County administrator and arena director, and William L. Brault, a Green Bay restaurateur and Packers fan, co-founded the Packer Hall of Fame museum in 1966.

As of 2019, the Packers Hall of Fame has inducted 162 people, 24 of whom have been inducted into the Pro Football Hall of Fame.

== Notable coaches ==
=== Current staff ===
Green Bay Packers staff
Front office: Owner: Publicly held corporation; Executive committee – Board of directors; President/CEO – Ed Policy; General manager – Brian Gutekunst; Executive vice president/Director of football operations – Russ Ball; Vice president of player personnel – Milt Hendrickson; Director of football operations – John Wojciechowski; Director of player personnel – Richmond Williams; Senior player personnel executive – Matt Malaspina; Director of college scouting – Patrick Moore; Senior player personnel executive/Director of pro scouting – Lee Gissendaner; Assistant director of pro scouting – Mike Owen; Senior national scout – Sam Seale; National scout – Luke Benuska; Director of player engagement – Grey Ruegamer; Director of performance psychology/team behavioral health clinician – Chris Carr; Director of football administration/player finance – Melanie Marohl; Head coaches: Head coach – Matt LaFleur; Quarterbacks/assistant head coach – offense – Luke Getsy; Outside linebackers/run game coordinator/assistant head coach – defense – DeMarcus Covington; Offensive coaches: Offensive coordinator – Adam Stenavich; Passing game coordinator – Jason Vrable; Running backs – Ben Sirmans; Wide receivers – Noah Pauley; Assistant wide receivers – Rob Grosso; Tight ends – John Dunn; Offensive line – Luke Butkus; Assistant offensive line – Eddie Gordon; Pass game specialist/game management – Connor Lewis; Offensive assistant – Jeremiah Kolone; Offensive quality control – T. C. McCartney	Defensive coaches: Defensive coordinator – Jonathan Gannon; Defensive line – Vince Oghobaase; Linebackers – Sam Siefkes; Secondary/pass game coordinator – Bobby Babich; Cornerbacks – Daniel Bullocks; Defensive analyst – Scott Fuchs; Defensive quality control – Jamael Lett; Defensive quality control – Will Smart; Special teams coaches: Special teams coordinator – Cameron Achord; Assistant special teams – Cory Harkey; Assistant special teams – Jeff Koonz; Strength and conditioning: Strength and conditioning coordinator – Aaron Hill; Strength and conditioning assistant – Jake Flint; Strength and conditioning assistant – Marcus Jones; Strength and conditioning assistant – Ben Schumacher; → Coaching staff → Front office → More NFL staffs

=== Head coaches ===
Name	Tenure	Record			Titles
Name	Tenure	W	L	T	Titles
Earl (Curly) Lambeau	1919–1949	231	108	21	6
Gene Ronzani	1950–1953	14	31	1	
Hugh Devore*	1953	0	2	0	
Ray (Scooter) McLean*	1953	0	2	0	
Lisle Blackbourn	1954–1957	17	31	0	
Ray (Scooter) McLean	1958	1	10	1	
Vince Lombardi	1959–1967	98	30	4	5
Phil Bengtson	1968–1970	20	21	1	
Dan Devine	1971–1974	25	28	4	
Bart Starr	1975–1983	53	77	3	
Forrest Gregg	1984–1987	25	37	1	
Lindy Infante	1988–1991	24	40	0	
Mike Holmgren	1992–1998	73	36	0	1
Ray Rhodes	1999	8	8	0	
Mike Sherman	2000–2005	56	39	0	
Mike McCarthy	2006–2018	125	77	2	1
Joe Philbin*	2018	2	2	0	
Matt LaFleur	2019–present	84	49	1	

*Interim head coaches

== Media ==
The Packers are unique in having their market area cover two media markets, both Green Bay and Milwaukee. NFL blackout restrictions for the team apply within both areas. However, Packers games have not been blacked out locally since 1972 (the last year home game local telecasts were prohibited regardless of sellout status) due to strong home attendance and popularity. As mentioned above, every Packers home game—preseason, regular season and playoffs—has been sold out since 1960.

=== Radio ===
The flagship station of the Packers Radio Network is iHeartMedia's WRIT-FM (95.7) in Milwaukee. Formerly, Good Karma Brands's WTMJ in Milwaukee, served as the flagship station, and had broadcast the team's games since 1929, producing the games until the end of the 2018 season, when the team brought their broadcast operations in-house, thus the personnel is directly employed by the team. WTMJ's relationship with the team was the longest-lived between a radio station and an NFL team, and the only rights deal in American professional sports where a station outside of the team's main metro area is the radio flagship, as WTMJ's signal is city-grade across eastern Wisconsin. Games air in Green Bay on WTAQ (1360/97.5) and WIXX-FM (101.1), and WYDR (94.3) in Appleton and the Fox Cities.

Wayne Larrivee is the play-by-play announcer and Larry McCarren is the color analyst. Larrivee joined the team after many years as the Chicago Bears' announcer. Jim Irwin and Max McGee were the longtime radio announcers before Larrivee and McCarren. When victory is assured for the Packers, either a game-winning touchdown, interception or a crucial 4th down defensive stop, Larrivee's trademark declaration of "And there is your dagger!" signifies the event.

On October 27, 2021, the Packers announced that it would end its longtime association with WTMJ at the end of the season, with WRNW becoming the team's Milwaukee radio affiliate in 2022. WRIT-FM became the team's Milwaukee affiliate starting with the team's away game with Arizona on October 19, 2025, after WRNW switched to an adult contemporary format after layoffs which affected most of the sports talk station's hosts and personnel.

=== Television ===
The TV rights for pre-season games not nationally broadcast are held by E. W. Scripps Company-owned television stations WGBA-TV (channel 26) in Green Bay and WTMJ-TV (channel 4) in Milwaukee; the game broadcasts are distributed to 19 further TV stations in Wisconsin, Michigan, North Dakota, South Dakota, Iowa, Nebraska, Illinois, Missouri, and Alaska, as well as Spanish-language WYTU-LD "Telemundo Wisconsin" in Milwaukee (also broadcast on its sister station WMEI in Green Bay, usually an English-language MeTV station). The deal marked a change in affiliate in Green Bay from WFRV-TV; in the wake of the 2012 deal, McCarren resigned his duties as sports director of WFRV to move to WTMJ/WGBA as a Packers analyst, becoming WGBA's official sports director on April 1, 2013. McCarren left WGBA in 2015 and became a team employee. Spectrum News 1 also rebroadcasts team programming, including the team's two programs aired across the preseason network on weeknights before prime time; Packers Live and The Matt LeFleur Show, respectively.

The team's intra-squad Lambeau scrimmage at the beginning of the season, marketed as Packers Family Night, was produced for over a decade by WLUK-TV in Green Bay and broadcast by the state's Fox affiliates through the 2016 season. In 2017, Scripps and the Packers Television Network began to originate the Packers Family Night broadcast.

Preseason television games are announced by Kevin Harlan, son of former Packers president Bob Harlan, and color commentator Rich Gannon. Regular-season and postseason games not aired on a broadcast network are simulcast on broadcast stations in the Green Bay and Milwaukee markets.

== In popular culture ==
On the television sitcom That '70s Show, in season 7 episode 14, Donna Pinciotti gives the gang and Red Forman, a long-time Packers fan, six free tickets to Lambeau Field for a Bears–Packers game. Eric (who has no interest in football himself, including not knowing Packers lore) wears a Walter Payton jersey to the game, with Packers fans teasing and booing him for doing so. In the season 8 finale, Red declines to move to Florida after Steven Hyde acquires a season ticket package for him.

In 2015, five members of the Packers (David Bakhtiari, Don Barclay, T. J. Lang, Clay Matthews, and Josh Sitton) made an appearance as an a cappella group in the musical comedy Pitch Perfect 2. Aaron Rodgers' brother Jordan also appeared. That same year, Rodgers himself appeared in an episode of the sketch comedy television series Key & Peele, along with Ha Ha Clinton-Dix.

In the television series Danny Phantom, the main antagonist, Vlad Masters/Vlad Plasmius, is a Packers "Fanatic". His prized possession is a football autographed by Ray Nitschke, and his dream is to own the team.

In the 1998 film There's Something about Mary, Mary, played by actress Cameron Diaz, consistently talks about her boyfriend "Brett". It is revealed towards the end of the film that "Brett" is then-Packers' quarterback Brett Favre.

Preceded by Providence Steam Roller	NFL champions 1929, 1930, 1931	Succeeded by Chicago Bears
Preceded by Detroit Lions	NFL champions 1936	Succeeded by Washington Redskins
Preceded by New York Giants	NFL champions 1939	Succeeded by Chicago Bears
Preceded by Chicago Bears	NFL champions 1944	Succeeded by Cleveland Rams
Preceded by Philadelphia Eagles	NFL champions 1961, 1962	Succeeded by Chicago Bears
Preceded by Cleveland Browns	NFL champions 1965, 1966, 1967	Succeeded by Baltimore Colts
Preceded by None	Super Bowl champions 1966 (I), 1967 (II)	Succeeded by New York Jets
Preceded by Dallas Cowboys	Super Bowl champions 1996 (XXXI)	Succeeded by Denver Broncos
Preceded by New Orleans Saints	Super Bowl champions 2010 (XLV)	Succeeded by New York Giants
