= Tampa Bay Buccaneers =

NFL team in Tampa, Florida

- Current season
Logo	Wordmark
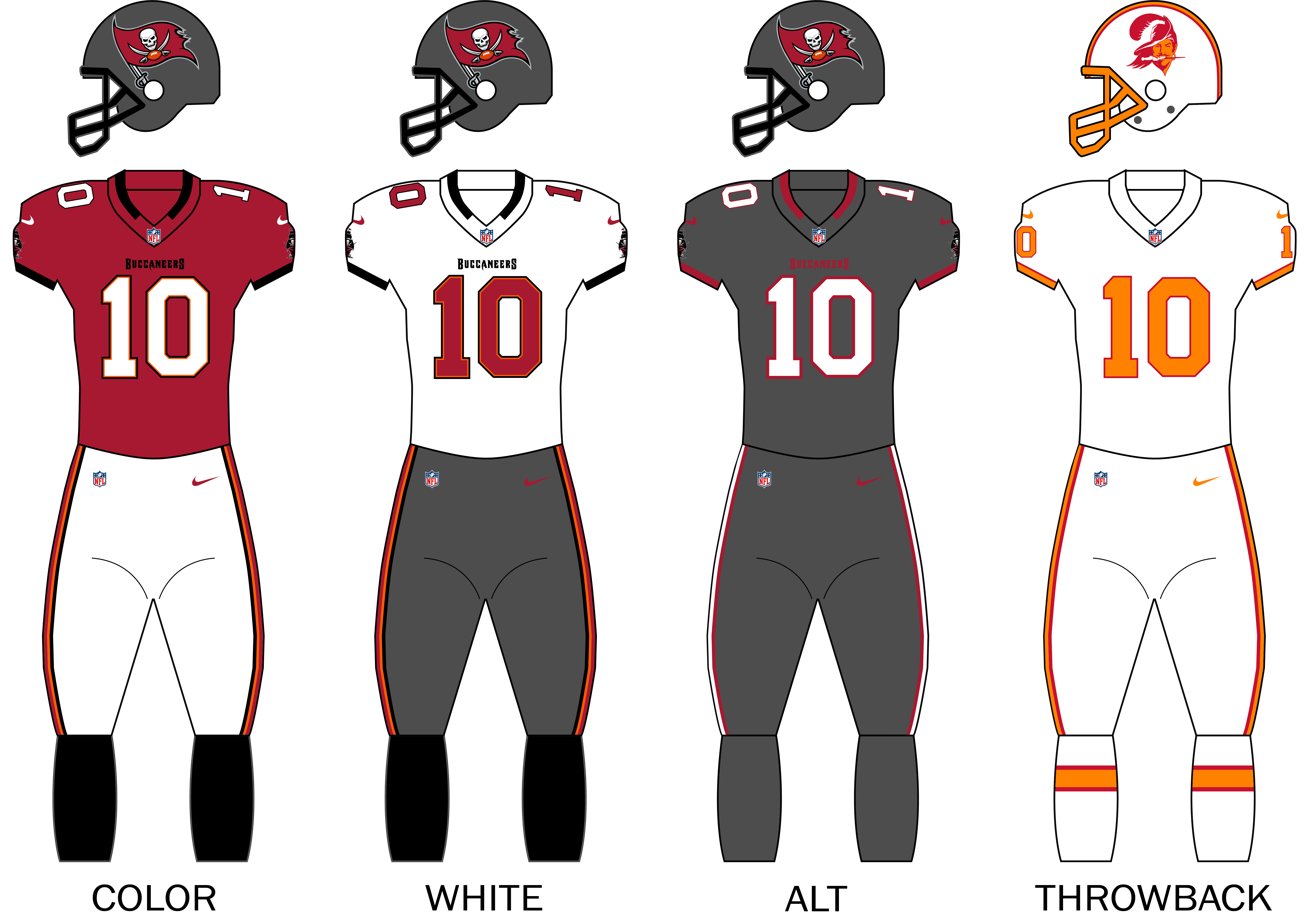
- Uniforms

General information
- Founded: April 24, 1974; 52 years ago
- Stadium: Raymond James Stadium; Tampa, Florida
- Headquartered: One Buccaneer Place, Tampa, Florida
- Colors: Buccaneer red, pewter, orange, black
- Fight song: "Hey! Hey! Tampa Bay!"
- Mascot: Captain Fear
- Website: buccaneers.com

Personnel
- Owner: Glazer family (Note: Consisting of Bryan Glazer, Darcie Glazer Kassewitz, Edward Glazer, Joel Glazer, Avram Glazer, and Kevin Glazer)
- General manager: Jason Licht
- Head coach: Todd Bowles
- President: Darcie Glazer Kassewitz

Nickname
- The Bucs

Team history
- Tampa Bay Buccaneers (1976–present)

Home fields
- Tampa Stadium (1976–1997); Raymond James Stadium (1998–present)

League / conference affiliations
- National Football League (1976–present): American Football Conference (1976); AFC West (1976); National Football Conference (1977–present); NFC Central (1977–2001); NFC South (2002–present)

Championships
- Super Bowl championships: 2 2002 (XXXVII), 2020 (LV)
- Conference championships: 2: NFC: 2002, 2020
- Division championships: 10: NFC Central: 1979, 1981, 1999; NFC South: 2002, 2005, 2007, 2021, 2022, 2023, 2024

Playoff appearances (15)
- NFL: 1979, 1981, 1982, 1997, 1999, 2000, 2001, 2002, 2005, 2007, 2020, 2021, 2022, 2023, 2024

Owners
- Hugh Culverhouse (1974–1994); Malcolm Glazer (1995–2014); Glazer family (2014–present)

The Tampa Bay Buccaneers (colloquially known as the Bucs) are a professional American football team based in Tampa, Florida. The Buccaneers compete in the National Football League (NFL) as a member of the National Football Conference (NFC) South division. They joined the NFL in 1974 as an expansion team, along with the Seattle Seahawks, and played their first season in 1976 as a member of the American Football Conference (AFC) West division.

Before the 1977 season, Tampa Bay switched conferences and divisions with Seattle, becoming a member of the NFC Central division. The Seahawks eventually rejoined the NFC in 2002, meaning the Buccaneers joined the Cleveland Browns, Pittsburgh Steelers, and Baltimore/Indianapolis Colts as the only NFL teams not playing in their original conference. As a result of the league's realignment before the 2002 season, the Buccaneers joined three former NFC West teams to form the NFC South. The team is owned by the Glazer family and plays its home games at Raymond James Stadium in Tampa.

The Buccaneers have won two Super Bowl championships and, along with the Baltimore Ravens, are the only two NFL franchises that are undefeated in multiple Super Bowl appearances. They were regarded as a perennial losing franchise for most of their first two decades due to suffering 26 consecutive losses in their first two seasons (including a winless inaugural season) and 14 consecutive losing seasons from 1983 to 1996—the most in NFL history—contributing to their league-worst overall winning percentage of .410

Despite these early struggles, Tampa Bay is the first post-merger expansion team to clinch a division title, win a playoff game, and host a conference championship, all of which they accomplished by their fourth season in 1979. The team's image improved by the time of their first championship in 2002, also the first for any of the six organizations built after the merger, (Note: Although the Baltimore Ravens are officially recognized as the first post-merger franchise to win a Super Bowl, the Ravens are the relocated football organization formerly enfranchised as the Cleveland Browns whereas the Buccaneers are the first post-merger franchise to win a Super Bowl without being the organizational continuation of any pre-merger team.) but they would not win another playoff game until their second Super Bowl championship season in 2020. In 2024, the team tied the New Orleans Saints for the most NFC South titles with seven. The 2024 season also set franchise and division records with four consecutive division titles as well as five consecutive playoff appearances.

== History ==
=== Hugh Culverhouse era (1976–1994) ===
==== John McKay years (1976–1984) ====
The Buccaneers joined the NFL as members of the AFC West in 1976. The next year, they were moved to the NFC Central, while the other 1976 expansion team, the Seattle Seahawks, switched conferences with Tampa Bay and joined the AFC West. This realignment was dictated by the league as part of the 1976 expansion plan, so that both teams could play each other twice and every other NFL franchise once during their first two seasons. Instead of a traditional schedule of playing each division opponent twice, the Buccaneers played every conference team once, plus the Seahawks.

Tampa Bay went 0–14 in their first season. They were outscored by an average of almost 21 points per game. Only three games ended with the Buccaneers within one possession. Until the Detroit Lions in 2008, the 1976 Buccaneers were the only Super Bowl-era team to go winless in a whole season. Their losing streak caused them to become the butt of late-night television comedians' jokes. Tampa Bay did not win their first game until the 13th week of their second season, starting with a record of 0–26 (though the Buccaneers had beaten the Atlanta Falcons, 17–3, in a 1976 pre-season game before their first regular season). The Saints' head coach, Hank Stram, was fired after losing to the Buccaneers. Their first win came on December 11, 1977, on the road against the New Orleans Saints in Week 13. Tampa Bay needed one more week to get their second victory, a home win over the St. Louis Cardinals in the 1977 season finale. The Cardinals also fired their coach, Don Coryell, shortly afterward.

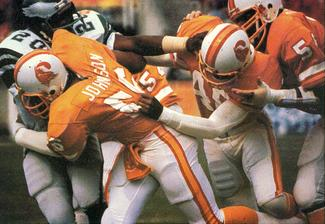
In their fourth season, the Buccaneers defeated the Eagles in their first playoff appearance in 1979 after suffering three consecutive losing seasons.

The Buccaneers improved to a 5–11 mark in 1978. The team boasted a strong defensive unit that finished seventh in points allowed. The team was competitive in numerous close games. The Buccaneers' situation improved rapidly in the 1979 season. With the maturation of quarterback Doug Williams and future four-time Pro Bowl tight end Jimmie Giles, the first 1,000-yard rushing season from running back Ricky Bell, and a smothering, league-leading, Star Studded defense led by future NFL Hall of Famer Lee Roy Selmon, the Buccaneers kicked off the season with five consecutive victories, a performance that landed them on the cover of Sports Illustrated.

With four games left in the season, the Buccaneers needed to win only one of them to make the playoffs. In the first, STP was put all over the goal posts in Tampa to prevent the goalposts from being ripped down in the event of a celebration. Four blocked kicks later, the Buccaneers wasted the oily substance, falling to the Minnesota Vikings 23–22. STP was wasted again the following week as the Buccaneers were shut out 14–0 by the Chicago Bears; and in O. J. Simpson's final home game in San Francisco, Tampa Bay lost its third straight attempt to clinch a division title against a 49ers team which came in with a 1–13 record. However, in the season finale at home against the Kansas City Chiefs, which was played in the worst downpour in Buccaneers history, Tampa Bay pulled out a 3–0 victory. Finishing with a 10–6 record, the Buccaneers had their first winning season in franchise history, and won the Central Division in a tiebreaker over the Bears. In an upset, the Buccaneers defeated the Philadelphia Eagles 24–17 in the divisional round of the playoffs. Because the Los Angeles Rams defeated the Dallas Cowboys in the other NFC playoff game, the Buccaneers hosted the NFC Championship Game the following week in Tampa. The Buccaneers lost to the Rams 9–0. In their fourth season, the Bucs seemed on the verge of fulfilling McKay's five-year plan. The Buccaneers regressed in 1980 and finished with a 5–10–1 mark.

The Buccaneers made the playoffs again by winning their division in the 1981 season. It came down to a thrilling final game at Detroit; the winner would take the Central Division crown and the loser would miss the playoffs. The Detroit Lions had not lost at home all season. Although the Buccaneers trailed early, an 84-yard touchdown bomb from quarterback Williams to wide receiver Kevin House and a fumble recovery for a touchdown by defensive tackle David Logan sealed the win for the Buccaneers. In the playoffs, the Cowboys defeated the Buccaneers, 38–0, in the divisional round. The loss remains the largest postseason shutout loss in franchise history.

The 1982 season started 0–3 for the Buccaneers, before a player's strike shut down the NFL for seven weeks. When the league resumed play, the Buccaneers were nicknamed the "Cardiac Kids" for winning five of their next six games, all in the final moments, to go 5–4 and qualify for the expanded playoff slate. In the first round, the Buccaneers once again faced the Cowboys at Dallas, losing 30–17. As it turned out, this would be the last winning regular season under Culverhouse's ownership.

Before the 1983 season, Williams bolted to the United States Football League in a salary dispute. The Buccaneers lost their first nine games of the 1983 season en route to finishing 2–14, the first of 12 consecutive seasons with at least ten losses—an NFL record. Included was the drafting of Heisman Trophy winner Bo Jackson with the first pick in the 1986 draft. Jackson had let it be known that he would never play a down for Hugh Culverhouse at Tampa Bay. Making good on his threat, he opted instead to play baseball for the Kansas City Royals and would later return for parts of football seasons with the Los Angeles Raiders. Along with Williams, who later was a Super Bowl champion quarterback for Washington, two other Buccaneers quarterbacks during this era led other teams to Super Bowl wins. Steve Young won with the 49ers and Trent Dilfer won with the Baltimore Ravens. In the 1984 season, the team went 6–10 in John McKay's final season.

Former Atlanta Falcons' coach Leeman Bennett was named head coach before the 1985 season. He led the team to consecutive 2–14 finishes in 1985 and 1986. Bennett was fired after the 1986 season. Ray Perkins was hired to be the head coach of the Buccaneers before the 1987 season. Perkins coached for the team for almost four seasons, getting fired during 1990 season. Under Perkins's tenure, the team won no more than five games in a single season.

Under Culverhouse, the Buccaneers were one of the NFL's more profitable teams during the 1980s; however, this was largely because he kept the payroll among the lowest in the league, hampering their ability to sign quality players. Attendance also sagged; at one point the Buccaneers went parts of three whole seasons without having a home game televised locally, and when they did it was more attributed to a strong visiting team with a large following in the area, such as the Chicago Bears or Green Bay Packers.

Hardy Nickerson, a future five-time Pro Bowl linebacker, signed as a free agent from the Pittsburgh Steelers. John Lynch, a future Pro Bowl, and Hall of Fame strong safety, was drafted in 1993. In the 1995 NFL draft the Buccaneers drafted two future Hall of Famers: Warren Sapp and Derrick Brooks. Pro Bowl Fullback, Mike Alstott, was drafted the next year in the 1996 draft.

=== Glazer family era (1995–present) ===
Despite the profitability of the Buccaneers in the 1980s, Culverhouse's death in 1994 revealed a man close to bankruptcy despite having a low payroll for his team. His son, Miami attorney Hugh Culverhouse Jr. soon sued his father's associates (Stephen Story, Jack Donlan, and Fred Cone) who had built the trust account that was meant to manage the elder Culverhouse's business (which involved a $350 million estate) after having his wife sign a post-nuptial agreement. At any rate, a settlement was soon reached that gave control of the trust to Culverhouse Jr., who sold the team for $192 million. Interested parties included New York Yankees owner George Steinbrenner and Baltimore Orioles owner Peter Angelos, the latter of whom publicly declared he would move the team to Baltimore, as the city did not have an NFL franchise at that time.

However, in a last-minute surprise, real estate magnate Malcolm Glazer outbid both of them for $192 million, the highest sale price for a professional sports franchise up to that point. Glazer immediately placed his sons Bryan, Edward, and Joel in charge of the team's financial affairs. He stated that he had every intention of keeping the team in Tampa, but informed area citizens its current stadium deal would not support the record paid amount and that a new stadium would be required. The Glazers convinced Hillsborough County voters to raise sales taxes to fund the construction of what would become Raymond James Stadium.

==== Tony Dungy years (1996–2001) ====
The Glazers' deep pockets and serious commitment to fielding a winning team–in Tampa Bay–finally allowed the Buccaneers to become competitive. The team's performance dramatically improved when the Glazers hired Minnesota Vikings defensive coordinator Tony Dungy as head coach. Additionally, the team jettisoned the old uniform designs in favor of a modern look.

During Dungy's first season in 1996, the team continued to struggle, starting the season 1–8. But in the second half of the season, they finished 5–2, primarily due to the performance of a defense ranked seventh in the NFL led by Hardy Nickerson and the maturing of Sam Wyche's draftees Brooks, Lynch, and Sapp. Dungy, with his even-tempered personality, quickly brought balance and morale to the team, and his Cover 2 defensive scheme, sharpened to perfection by defensive coordinator Monte Kiffin and linebackers coach Lovie Smith, became the foundation for Tampa Bay's future success. Their version of Cover 2 was so successful that it became known as the Tampa 2. It has been brought to the Chicago Bears by Smith, Detroit Lions by Rod Marinelli, Kansas City Chiefs by Herman Edwards and to the Indianapolis Colts by Dungy himself, and copied by several other teams.

The team started the 1997 season 5–0, picking up where they left off the previous year, and this quick start once again landed them on the cover of Sports Illustrated twice. The Buccaneers went 10–6 for their first winning season and playoff appearance since 1982, as a wild-card team. In the Buccaneers' final home game at Houlihan's Stadium (formerly Tampa Stadium), the team defeated the Lions 20–10. They lost at Lambeau Field to the eventual NFC champion Packers 21–7 in the Divisional Round. Still, there was reason for optimism, and the expectations were high for the following season.

The 1998 season, the first to be played in the newly constructed Raymond James Stadium, saw the Buccaneers lose several close games en route to a disappointing 8–8 record. The Buccaneers had to play the first six football games of the year (including preseason) on the road, as the new stadium was not quite finished.

The 1999 season brought much better fortune. On the strength of the NFL's number 3 overall defense and a performance by rookie quarterback Shaun King, the Buccaneers finished the season with an 11–5 record and won their third NFC Central Division Championship. They beat the Washington Redskins 14–13 in the Divisional round, before losing to the eventual Super Bowl Champion St. Louis Rams in a low-scoring NFC Championship Game, 11–6. The Buccaneers' loss was controversial, highlighted by the reversal of a pass from King to wide receiver Bert Emanuel, which ended the Buccaneers' chances at continuing their last-minute drive. In league meetings after the season, the NFL changed the rules regarding what constituted an incomplete pass.

While the Buccaneers played well in 2000 and 2001 and made the playoffs in each season, they were unable to fulfill their primary goal of a Super Bowl victory. The wild card spots that Tampa Bay earned forced them to go on the road for their postseason opener in each year, and both road games took them into frigid Philadelphia to play the Eagles. The Buccaneers historically have struggled in games played with a temperature of less than 32 °F (0 °C) (as late as 1999, they had never won a game with a temperature played under 40 degrees) and the latter loss to the Eagles was the sixth time that Tampa Bay had lost a postseason game on the road (out of six played).

==== Jon Gruden years (2002–2008) ====
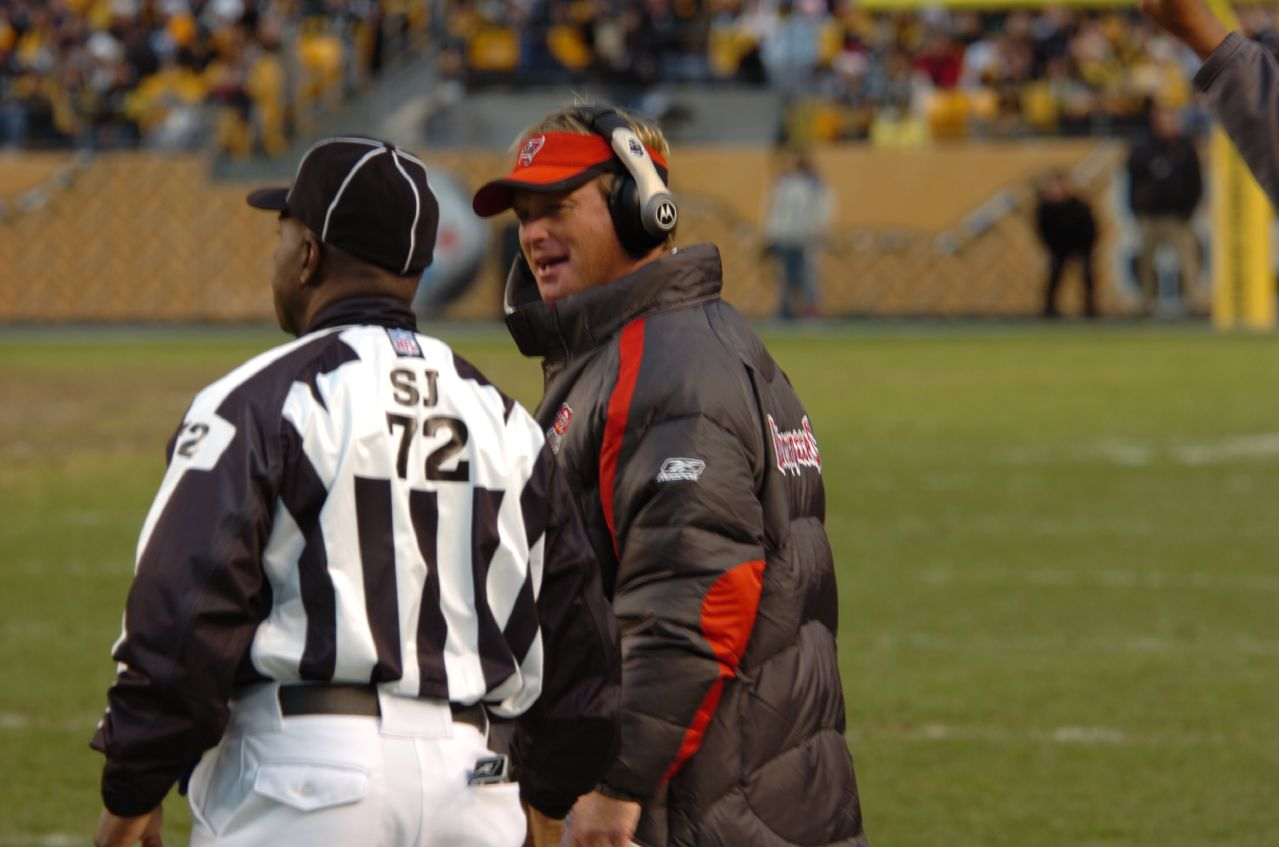
Jon Gruden coached the Buccaneers to a Super Bowl win in 2002.

Dungy was fired by the Buccaneers after a 31–9 loss to the Philadelphia Eagles in the Wildcard Round of 2001 and soon thereafter hired as the head coach of the Indianapolis Colts, while the Buccaneers mounted a search for his replacement that would include numerous names and rejections. Several potential candidates were offered the job, including University of Florida head coach (and former Buccaneers quarterback) Steve Spurrier, former New York Giants head coach Bill Parcells, and Baltimore Ravens defensive coordinator Marvin Lewis. Spurrier jumped to the Redskins when he was offered the most lucrative salary package ever offered to an NFL head coach, and Parcells eventually passed on the Buccaneers' offer—the second time he had done so in the history of the franchise. Buccaneers' general manager Rich McKay threw his support behind Lewis. The Glazer brothers were so displeased with the selection of yet another defensive-minded coach that they overruled McKay and took control of the candidate search themselves. They made it clear that their top choice was Jon Gruden; however, he was still under contract with the Oakland Raiders.

While talks with the Raiders were secretly underway, the Glazers publicly pursued another respected offensive mind, San Francisco 49ers head coach Steve Mariucci. Just when initial reports indicated that Mariucci had agreed to become both the Buccaneers' head coach and their general manager, Raiders owner Al Davis agreed to release Gruden to Tampa Bay.

The Glazers' shrewd move eventually paid off in acquiring Gruden, but it was costly. The team hired Gruden away from the Raiders on February 20, 2002, but the price was four draft picks, including the Buccaneers' first and second-round picks in 2002, their first-round pick in 2003, and their second-round selection in 2004, along with $8 million in cash. (The league as a result prohibited any further trading of draft picks for coaches.) Gruden was frustrated by the limitation of his coaching authority by Davis and was more than pleased to return to Tampa Bay. His parents lived in Carrollwood, and he had spent part of his childhood in Tampa in the early 1980s when his father was a running backs coach and later a scout for the Buccaneers.

Upon his arrival in Tampa, Gruden immediately went to work, retooling a sluggish offense, changing over 50% of the starting offense. With a new Tailback, Wide Receiver, Two Tight Ends, Left Tackle, and Left Guard, Gruden put his stamp on the teams offense to remove the "Dungy's Team" label. The league's sweeping realignment sent the Buccaneers to the new NFC South Division, along with the Falcons, Carolina Panthers and New Orleans Saints.

===== Super Bowl XXXVII champions (2002) =====
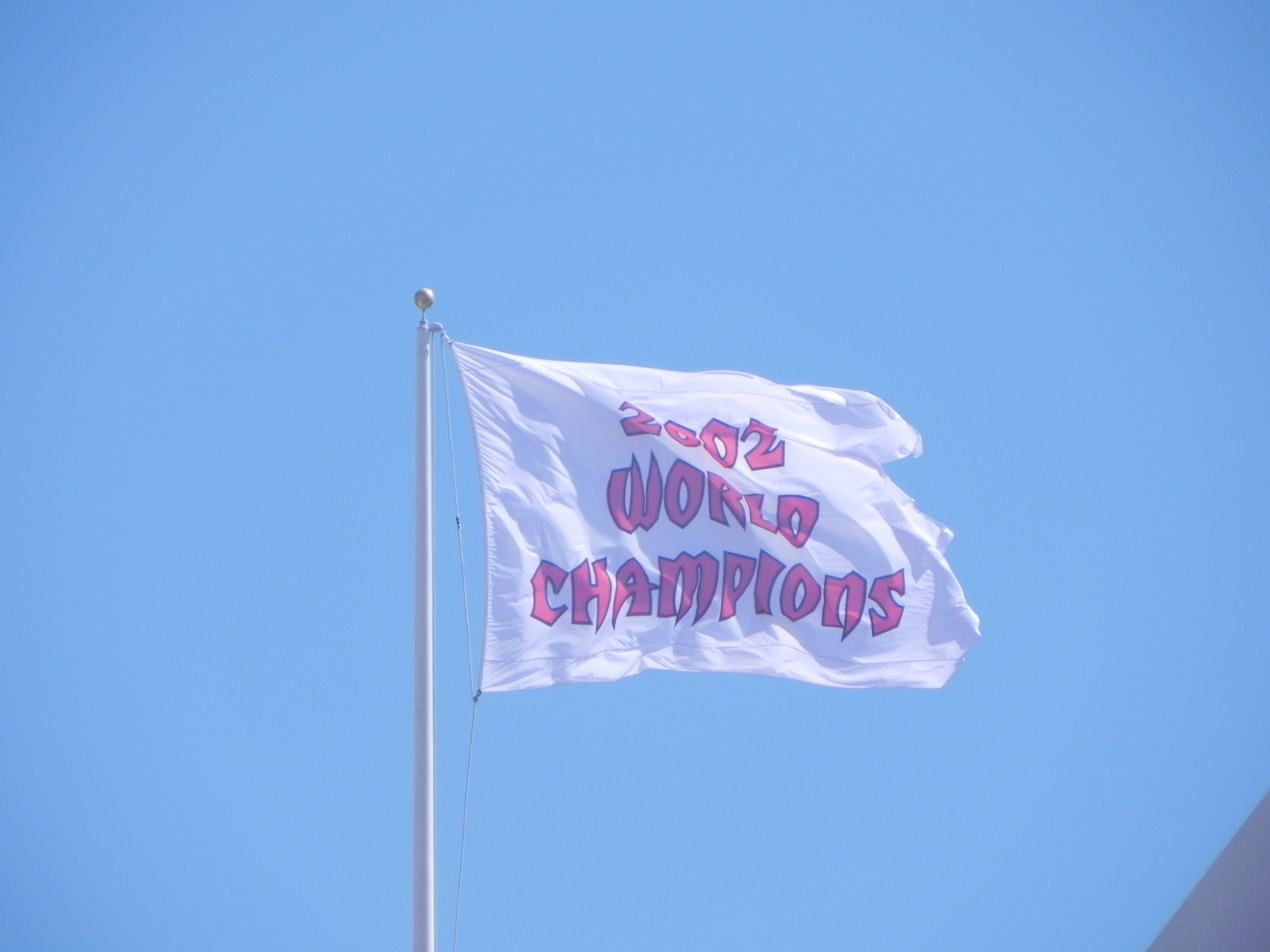
The Buccaneers' Super Bowl XXXVII champions flag

Led by the league's top defense, the 2002 season was the Buccaneers' most successful to date. Linebacker Derrick Brooks was named the NFL Defensive Player of the Year with a tendency to make big plays. They won the NFC South title with the team's best ever record, 12–4, and scored more points in two playoff wins over the 49ers and Eagles than in Buccaneers playoff history combined. The Philadelphia Eagles were a thorn in Tampa Bay's side, having eliminated the Buccaneers in each of the last two seasons' wild card games. Tampa Bay entered the game as heavy underdogs and fell behind early. However, the Buccaneers persevered and took a ten-point lead into the fourth quarter. Ronde Barber sealed the win in dramatic fashion with a late interception return for a touchdown, and a 27–10 victory. The Buccaneers then went on to rout Gruden's former team, the Raiders, who had the league's number one offense, by a score of 48–21 in Super Bowl XXXVII, nicknamed 'The Pirate Bowl'.

Soon after the Super Bowl victory, a growing number of press reports indicated Gruden's lack of patience with general manager McKay, a major architect of the Buccaneers' rebuilding effort over the previous ten years. McKay, like Gruden, had long-established ties to the Tampa Bay area. However, during the 2003 season, the Gruden-McKay relationship deteriorated as the Buccaneers struggled on the field. In November, Keyshawn Johnson was deactivated by the team ten games into the season for his conduct, which included sideline arguments with Buccaneers coaches and players. Johnson was eventually traded to the Dallas Cowboys for wide receiver Joey Galloway, who later in his career played for the New England Patriots, Pittsburgh Steelers, and Washington Redskins.

In December, the Glazers allowed McKay to leave the Bucs before the end of the regular season, and he promptly joined the Falcons as president and general manager. Thus, McKay watched his first game as a Falcons executive sitting next to owner Arthur Blank in a Raymond James Stadium skybox. The Falcons defeated the Buccaneers 30–28. The Buccaneers suffered a sluggish start and finished the season 7–9. With the Raiders' dismal 4–12 performance, neither Super Bowl team reached the playoffs that year.

For 2004, Bruce Allen was hired as general manager. After Allen's arrival, both John Lynch and Warren Sapp were released, stunning many Buccaneers fans. The distracted Buccaneers began the 2004 season with a 1–5 record, their worst start under Gruden. The fading accuracy of kicker Martín Gramática did not help matters, as the team lost many close games en route to a 5–11 record.

In the 2005 season, the Buccaneers celebrated their 30th season in the league, and returned to their winning ways. The Buccaneers selected Carnell "Cadillac" Williams in the first round of the 2005 draft, and the rookie would provide a running game the Buccaneers had not possessed since the days of James Wilder Sr. in the 1980s. Williams would later go on to receive the NFL Offensive Rookie of the Year Award. After starting 5–1, the team entered a midseason slump hampered by a season-ending injury to starting quarterback Brian Griese. Replacement starter Chris Simms struggled early, but came into his own, leading the team to a last-minute win over the Redskins. The Buccaneers won the NFC South Division finishing 11–5. The season ended abruptly, however, with a 17–10 loss in the Wild Card round, in a rematch with Washington that saw receiver Edell Shepherd drop the potential game-winning catch in the endzone.

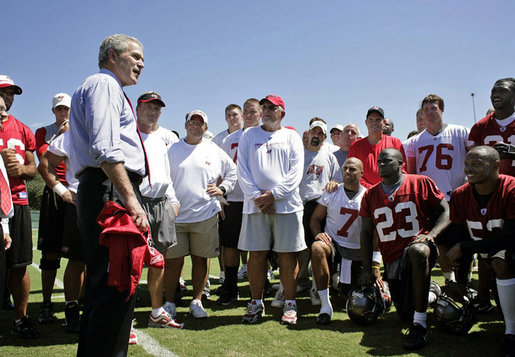
President George W. Bush visiting the Buccaneers at practice

After winning the division in 2005, the Buccaneers suffered through an abysmal 2006 season. The season was plagued by injuries, with starters such as guard Dan Buenning, wide receiver Michael Clayton, running back Cadillac Williams, defensive end Simeon Rice, cornerback Brian Kelly, and quarterback Chris Simms all being placed on injured reserve at some point in the season. The season also saw a lot of rookies starting for the Buccaneers, such as quarterback Bruce Gradkowski, tackle Jeremy Trueblood, and guard Davin Joseph.

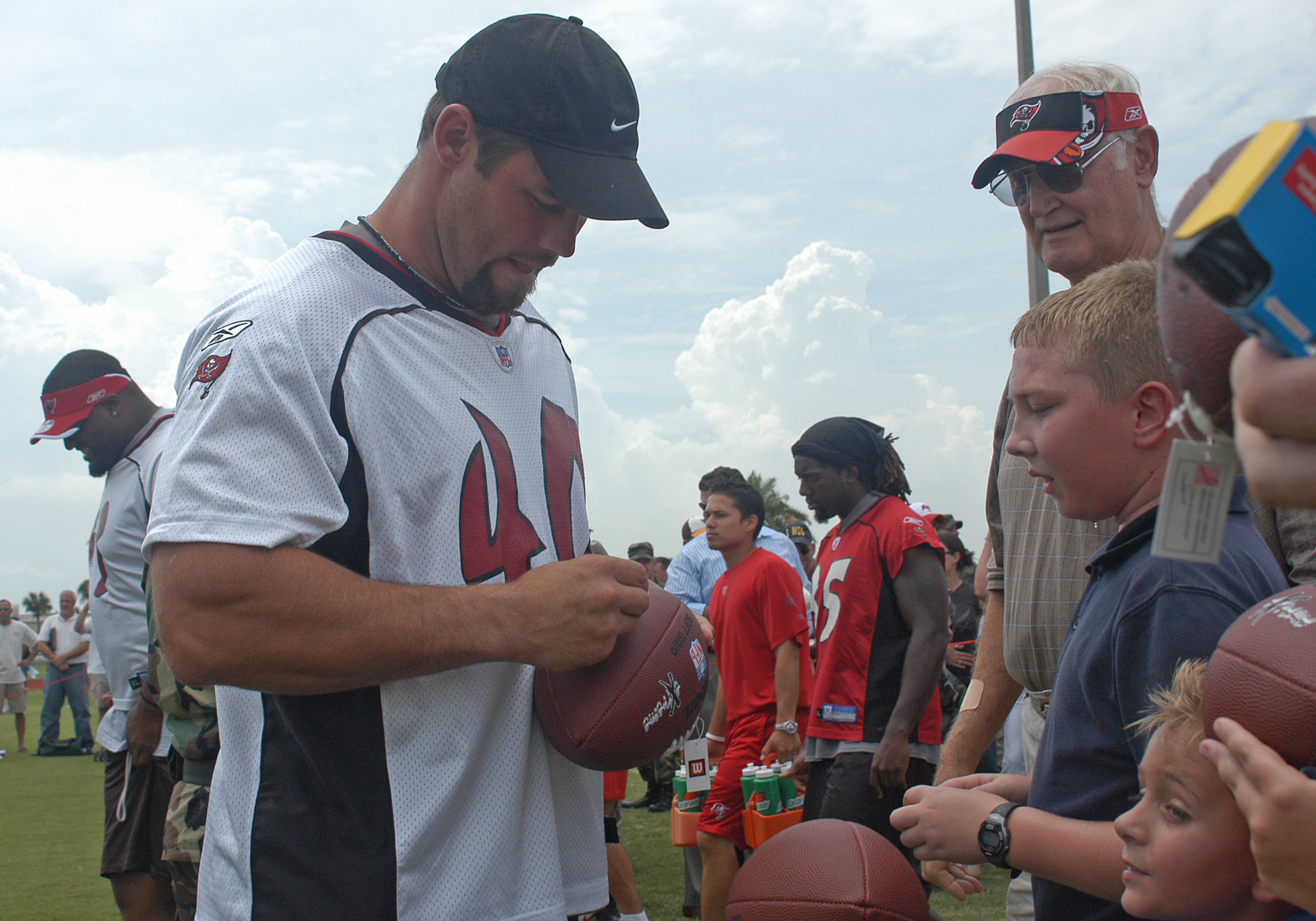
Fan favorite fullback Mike Alstott

The Buccaneers started off the season 0–3, with Simms throwing one touchdown to seven interceptions. In the third game of the season, a last-minute loss to the Panthers, Simms's spleen was ruptured, and he was placed on injured reserve for the balance of the season. After their bye week, the Buccaneers elected to start Gradkowski, a sixth-round pick from Toledo. After nearly beating the Saints, Gradkowski led the team to last-minute wins over the Cincinnati Bengals and Philadelphia Eagles. The success was short-lived, however, and the Buccaneers lost five of the next six games. Tim Rattay replaced Gradkowski as quarterback late in the season, and the team finished 4–12. The aged defense, with five starters who had played there for a decade or more, was ranked 17th overall, the first time a Tampa Bay defense was not ranked in the top ten since 1996.

After the disappointing 2006 season, the Buccaneers for the first time in several seasons had money to spend in free agency. They brought in quarterback Jeff Garcia, offensive tackle Luke Petitgout, defensive end Kevin Carter, and linebacker Cato June. On April 28, 2007, the Buccaneers drafted Clemson defensive end Gaines Adams with the 4th overall pick in the NFL draft. After the draft the Buccaneers picked up tight end Jerramy Stevens. and defensive tackle Ryan Sims.

The off-season changes resulted in the Buccaneers winning the NFC South title in the 2007 season, finishing with a 9–7 record, and the 4th seed in the conference. The division crown was the second one in three seasons under Gruden. In the Wild Card round of the playoffs held on January 6, 2008, the Buccaneers lost to the eventual Super Bowl champion Giants by a final score of 24–14.

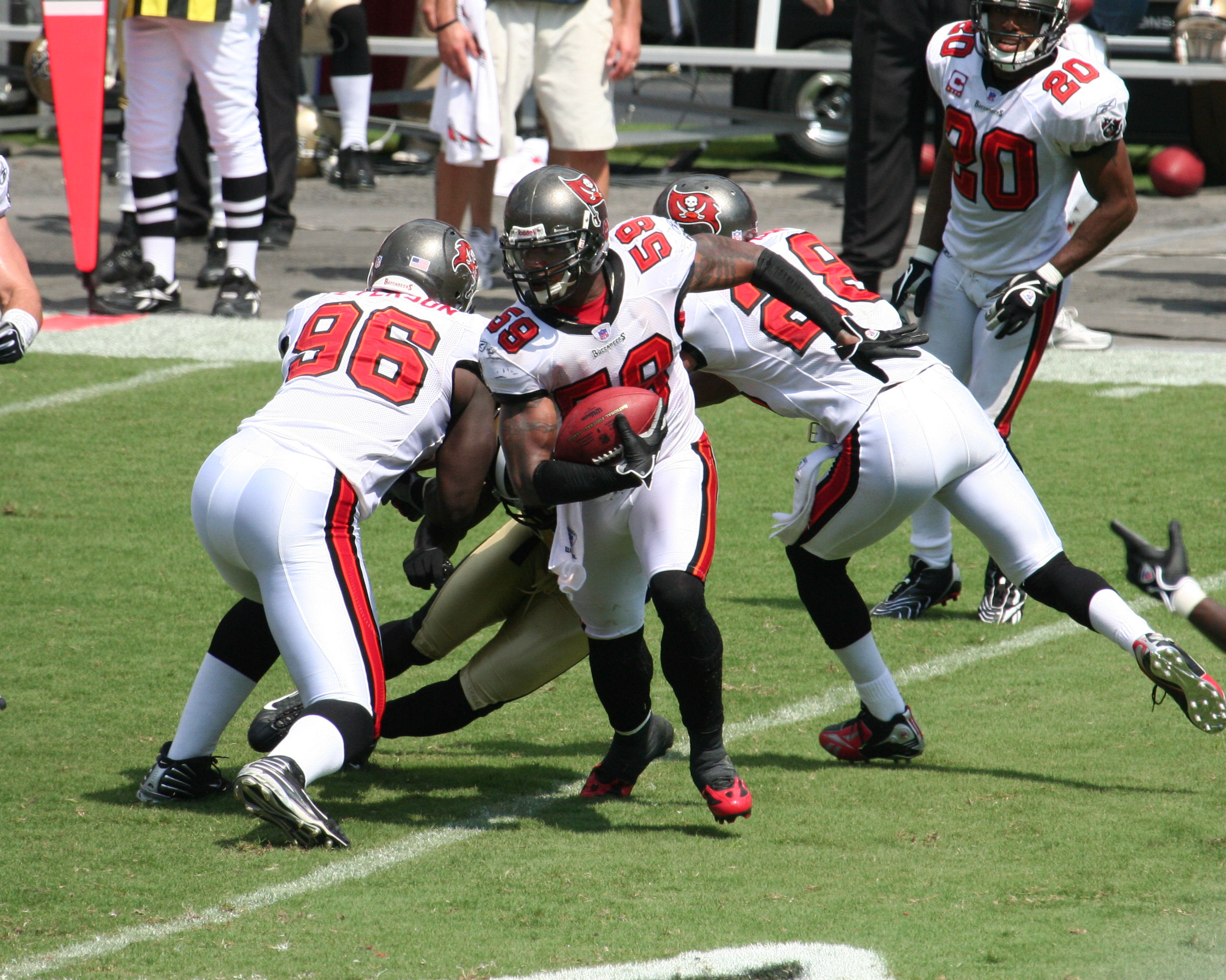
2007 was the last time the Buccaneers made the playoffs until 2020.

During the 2008 offseason, the Buccaneers re-signed head coach Gruden and general manager Allen through the 2011 season. They also acquired former players Warrick Dunn, who had spent the last 6 seasons with the Falcons, and Brian Griese, who was the starting quarterback for the team in 2005 until a knee injury sidelined him for the remainder of the year. Chris Simms was finally released, having not played in a game since his injury in 2006. The Buccaneers got off to a great start in 2008, with a 9–3 record going into the final month of the season, tied for first place in the division, with a chance at the top seed in the conference. On December 2, it was announced that defensive coordinator Monte Kiffin would be leaving the team after the season's end, for the same job at the University of Tennessee, serving under his son Lane Kiffin, who had just been named the new head coach at the school. After the announcement, the Buccaneers would lose their final four games of the season to finish 9–7 for the second consecutive season. Unlike 2007, it was not enough to secure the division championship, nor a playoff appearance.

Raheem Morris was named the replacement for Monte Kiffin as defensive coordinator in December 2008. A month later, after the huge collapse that ended the 2008 season, the Buccaneers fired Jon Gruden and swiftly elevated Morris to the head coach position. Bruce Allen was also let go, with Mark Dominik named his successor as general manager. Several veterans were released including Derrick Brooks, Joey Galloway, and Jeff Garcia. The new staff traded for tight end Kellen Winslow Jr., signed quarterback Byron Leftwich, and drafted Josh Freeman with the 17th overall pick.

==== Raheem Morris ====
The 2009 squad started out 0–7, behind Leftwich and later Josh Johnson. After their bye week, the team elevated Freeman to starting quarterback, resulting in the team's first win of the season. The team finished 3–13, the worst record since 1991.

The Buccaneers' 2010 season surprised many, producing the greatest single-season turnaround in franchise history, going 10–6. This was largely behind the stellar performances of Freeman, rookie receiver Mike Williams, and LeGarrette Blount. Despite the effort, the team narrowly missed the playoffs, losing out on the wild card tiebreaker to the eventual Super Bowl XLV champion Green Bay Packers.

Tampa Bay began the 2011 season with high hopes, adding several key defensive players through the draft. After a 4–2 start, however, the Buccaneers collapsed, dropping ten consecutive games to finish 4–12. The day after a 45–24 loss to the Falcons in their final game of the season, the team fired Morris, offensive coordinator Greg Olson and the rest of his corresponding staff. During the Morris era, the lack of on-the-field success, along with several contributing factors, including the recession, saw attendance slip, precipitating local television blackouts for the first time since the mid-1990s. All eight regular-season home games were blacked out in 2010, and five of seven were blacked out in 2011 (one "home" game was played in London).

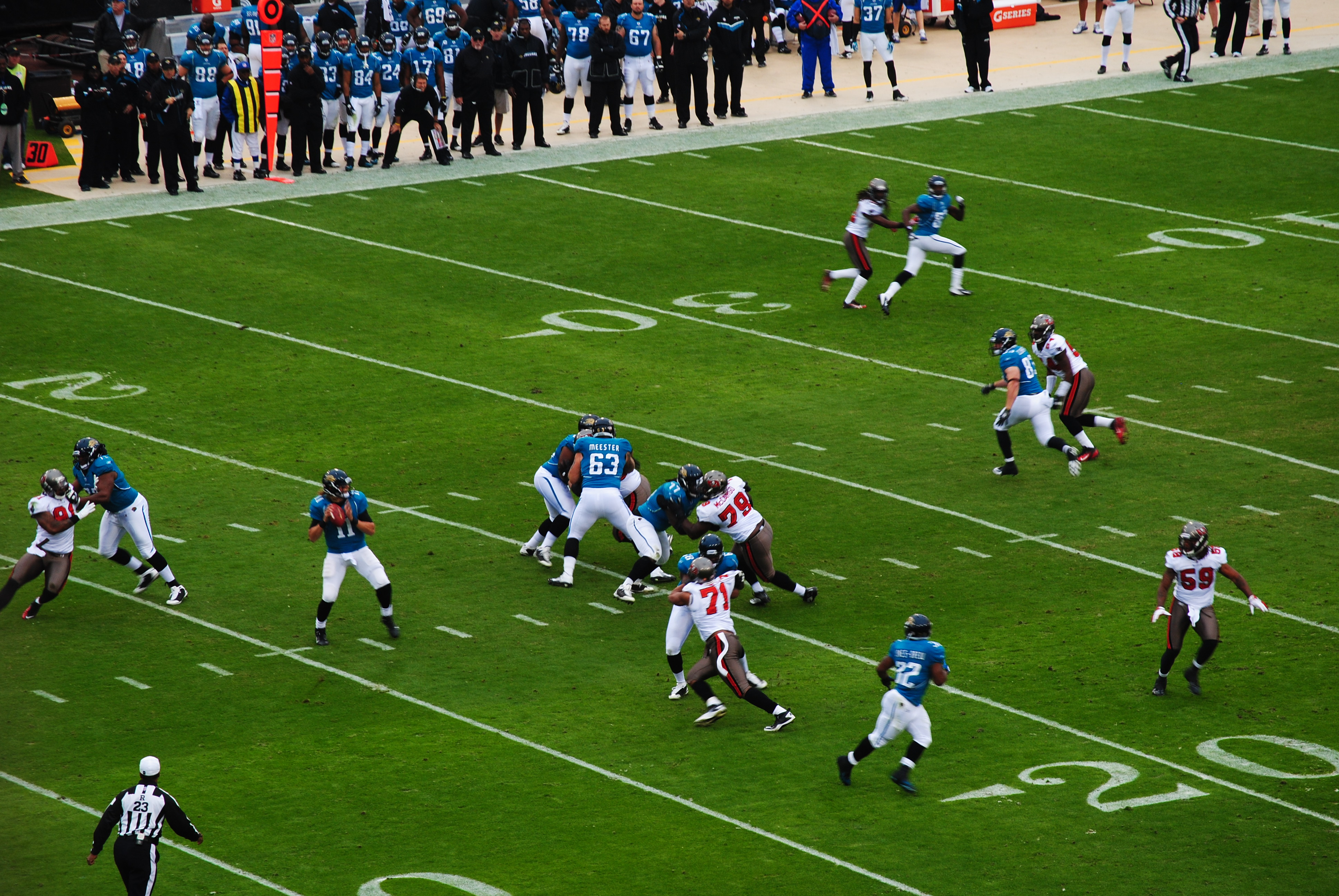
The Buccaneers vs. the Jacksonville Jaguars in 2011

==== Greg Schiano ====
About three weeks after firing Raheem Morris, the Buccaneers hired Greg Schiano from Rutgers as the new head coach. During his introductory conference he stated "There will be Buccaneer men, and there will be a Buccaneer Way." The phrase "The Buccaneer Way" became a slogan among fans and local media, describing the new regime and attitude. The team filled out the coaching staff with new faces, including Mike Sullivan, Bill Sheridan, and Butch Davis. In 2013, Dave Wannstedt was also added as special teams coach. In the first day of free agency, the club signed top prospects Vincent Jackson and Carl Nicks, as well as Eric Wright. The $140 million committed to the team during that 24-hour period is the largest investment the Glazer family has put into the team going back almost a decade.

The team finished the 2012 season at 7–9, notably ranking first in rushing defense. Furthermore, the rushing offense was highlighted by the breakout performance of Doug Martin. After two seasons of game-day local television blackouts, the improved team began seeing increased attendance and attention, and some blackouts lifted. 6 games were blacked out in 2012. For the three-year period of 2010–2012, the Buccaneers led the NFL in local television blackouts with 19 (Cincinnati was second with 11). Schiano's strict and regimented coaching style, however, drew criticism at the end of a game against the Giants, ordering his defense to continue to aggressively tackle the offense as Giants quarterback Eli Manning was taking a knee to end the game. Afterwards, Schiano was met at midfield by an irate Tom Coughlin, who did not appreciate the Buccaneers' aggressiveness.

Coming into the 2013 season, fans and analysts had better than average expectations for Tampa Bay. They were expected to improve their record, and potentially make a playoffs run. The predictions proved unfounded, as numerous issues on and off the field saw the team collapse. The team dealt with several players, including Lawrence Tynes, Carl Nicks, and Johnthan Banks, contracting antibiotic-resistant MRSA infections, which led to a 2015 lawsuit by Tynes that settled in 2017. During training camp, a reported rift began to divide Schiano and quarterback Josh Freeman. After an 0–3 start, Freeman was benched, and ultimately released. This was after Freeman reportedly missed several team meetings, along with the team's annual photograph. Schiano started rookie Mike Glennon, but the team continued to lose. The fans' confidence of Schiano began to decay rapidly, and after a 0–8 start, the team got its first win of the season on a Monday night against Miami. A brief win streak saw improvements with Glennon at quarterback, and Bobby Rainey took over at running back with stellar numbers after Doug Martin went down with a shoulder injury. There were no blackouts in 2013, as the Glazers bought up the necessary tickets for two of the games to get to the 85% threshold needed to prevent local blackouts.

Despite some individual improvements, and some impressive performances by members of the defense, the team dropped the last three games of the season, and finished 4–12. The team ranked last or near the bottom in almost every offensive category. On December 30, 2013, Schiano and general manager Mark Dominik were fired.

==== Lovie Smith ====
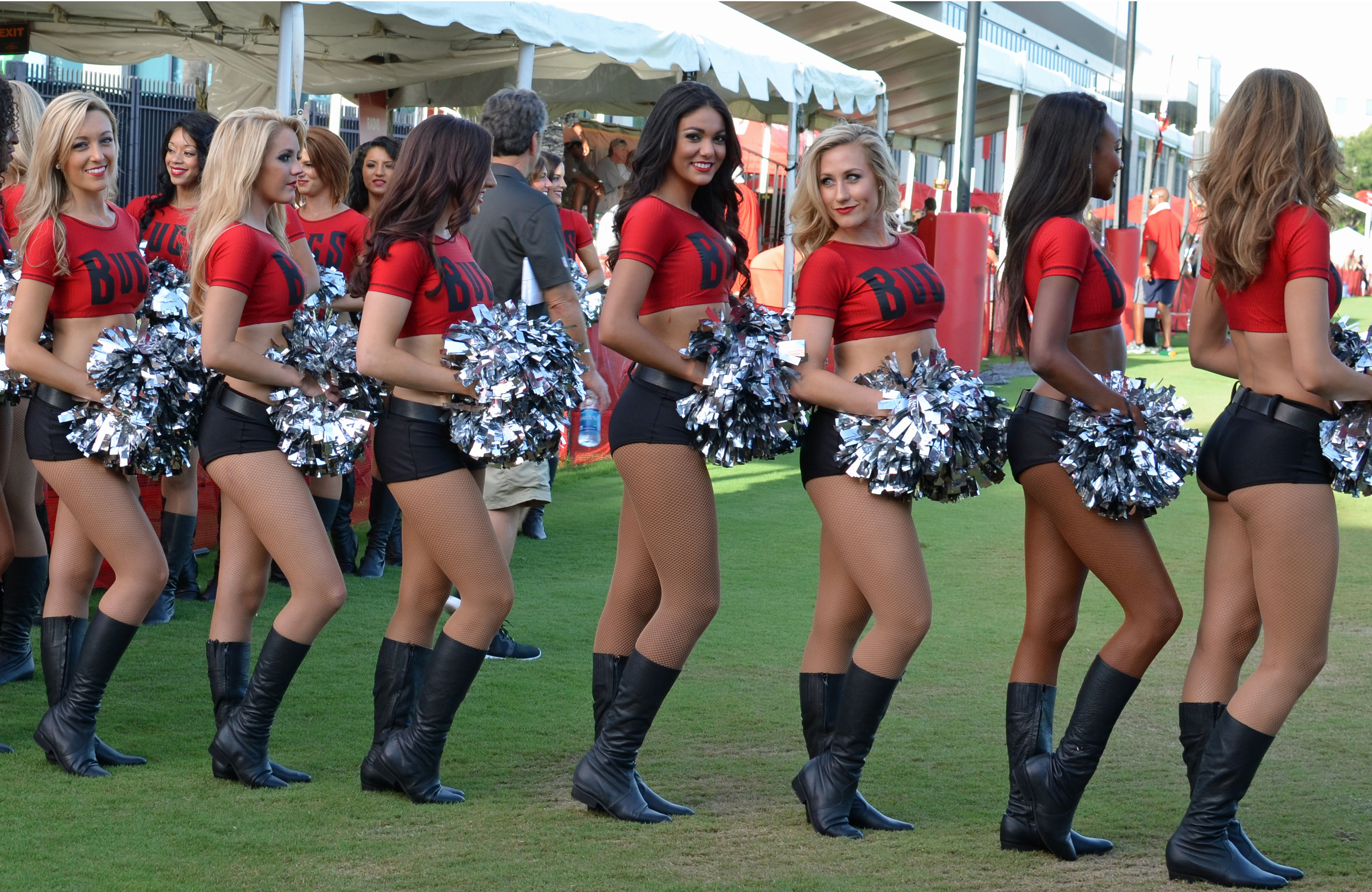
Tampa Bay Buccaneers Cheerleading squad, 2014

On January 1, 2014, Lovie Smith was hired as the new head coach of the Buccaneers, replacing Greg Schiano. Smith had previously spent 5 seasons with the Buccaneers from 1996 to 2001 coaching the linebackers under Tony Dungy. During his first news conference with the Buccaneers, Smith talked about restoring the quality of the team from the late 1990s and early 2000s: "There was a certain brand of football you expected from us," Smith said. "You know we would be relentless. There was a brand of football that you got from us each week at Raymond James Stadium. It was hard for opponents to come in and win. We have gotten away from that a little bit, and it's time ... for us to become a relevant team again."

On January 21, 2014, Jason Licht was hired as the new general manager, replacing Mark Dominik. He was officially introduced at One Buc Place on January 23, 2014. In his first news conference, Licht talked about his philosophy: "Our philosophy is going to be to build through the draft. That's where we find our stars. That's where we find the next generation. But also in the short term and long term we're going to supplement our roster through free agency but we're going to look for value. We're going to spend wisely."

After signing veteran free agent Josh McCown and many more free agents, many analysts predicted that the Buccaneers could be the surprise team of the year and possibly make a playoff run. Those predictions soon went away after the Buccaneers began the season 0–3, including a 56–14 blowout against the Falcons on Thursday Night Football. McCown was injured in that game, and second-year quarterback Mike Glennon was named the starter. His first start of the 2014 season ended with the Buccaneers earning their first victory of the season in Pittsburgh against the Steelers 27–24. The Buccaneers lost the next four games, including two overtime losses against the Saints and the Vikings, one blowout against the Ravens, and a 5-point loss against the Cleveland Browns. Going into week 10 at 1–8, McCown returned as the starter. Mathematically, the Buccaneers were still in playoff contention only being 3 games out of first place in the division. McCown's first game back ended with a 27–17 loss to the Falcons but won the following week in a 27–7 blowout against struggling Washington. The Buccaneers would lose the next three games and were officially knocked out of playoff contention in week 14. The Buccaneers finished 2–14, winning two fewer games than the previous season and secured the first-overall draft pick for the 2015 NFL draft.

Despite the team's record, first-round draft pick wide receiver Mike Evans had more than 1,000 receiving yards, and he became the youngest NFL player to record more than 200 receiving yards in a single game. Vincent Jackson also had more than 1,000 yards receiving, which represented Tampa Bay's first pair of 1,000 yard receivers in a season. Second-year cornerback Johnthan Banks led the team with 4 interceptions and has 50 tackles. Danny Lansanah flourished in the Tampa 2 system with 81 tackles, 1.5 quarterback sacks, and 3 interceptions, with 2 of those interceptions returned for touchdowns for the 2014 season. Jacquies Smith, who was signed from Buffalo after waiving rookie defensive end Scott Solomon a month into the season, had 17 combined tackles, 13 solo tackles, 6.5 sacks, and 1 forced fumble in only 8 starts for 2014.

In December 2014, a report surfaced that the Buccaneers used homeless people to sell beer and did not pay them.

After the conclusion of the 2014 season, Tampa Bay hired Ben Steele to become the team's new offensive quality control coach as well as former Falcons offensive coordinator Dirk Koetter to be their new offensive coordinator after parting ways with quarterbacks coach and interim offensive coordinator Marcus Arroyo. Having a 2–14 record, tied for the worst record in the NFL in 2014, Tampa Bay gained the first-overall pick in the 2015 NFL draft. They also made some headlines when they released quarterback Josh McCown on February 11, 2015, to save $5.25 million in cap space. With the first overall pick in the NFL draft, the Buccaneers selected Jameis Winston from Florida State. Throughout the off-season, there was much debate whether the Buccaneers should pick Winston or Oregon quarterback Marcus Mariota.

On January 6, 2016, Smith was fired by the Buccaneers after posting a record of 8–24 in his two seasons, including a 6–10 record in the 2015 season.

==== Dirk Koetter ====
On January 15, 2016, Dirk Koetter was promoted from offensive coordinator to become the new head coach of the Tampa Bay Buccaneers. In 2016, Koetter won his first game as head coach, but the team's record slipped to 3–5 by week 9 after a 43–28 loss to Atlanta on Thursday Night Football. The Buccaneers rattled off five straight victories, their longest winning streak since 2002. They earned upset victories over the heavily favored Chiefs and Seahawks, but snapped the streak with late-season losses to both Dallas and New Orleans. The Buccaneers ended with a 9–7 record, but lost the NFC's sixth seed to the Lions due to tiebreakers.

On March 9, 2017, the Buccaneers signed former Washington Redskins wide receiver DeSean Jackson, defensive tackle Chris Baker, former Cowboys safety J. J. Wilcox (traded to Pittsburgh Steelers), former New York Jets kicker Nick Folk, and veteran quarterback Ryan Fitzpatrick. The season got off to a 2–6 start with poor performance, especially in the kicking game. After a loss to the Lions in week 14, they were mathematically eliminated from the playoffs. Tampa Bay finished the season 5–11. This was their tenth consecutive season without a playoff appearance. Also, the Buccaneers finished last in the NFC South for the seventh time in nine seasons.

The Buccaneers began the 2018 season 2–0, their first 2–0 start since 2010. Journeyman quarterback Ryan Fitzpatrick started the first two games while Jameis Winston was serving a three-game suspension. Fitzpatrick threw for over 400 yards and four touchdowns in both games, against the Saints (the eventual NFC South winner) and the Eagles (the defending Super Bowl champions). On Monday night in Week 3 against the Steelers, Fitzpatrick became the first player in NFL history to throw for 400+ yards in three consecutive games. However, he also threw three interceptions, and Tampa Bay lost the game 30–27. Fitzpatrick remained the starter for Week 4 against the Bears. He struggled and was benched after halftime in favor of Winston. Winston was named the starter for Week 6, but was averaging at least two interceptions per game. After week 6's loss to the Falcons, defensive coordinator Mike Smith was fired and linebackers coach Mark Duffner was named interim defensive coordinator. Both Winston and Fitzpatrick took snaps under center as the season wore on, and at 5–7 they were still mathematically alive for the postseason. However, they dropped their last four games to finish 5–11. After a second consecutive last-place season, Koetter was fired.

==== Bruce Arians years (2019–2021) ====
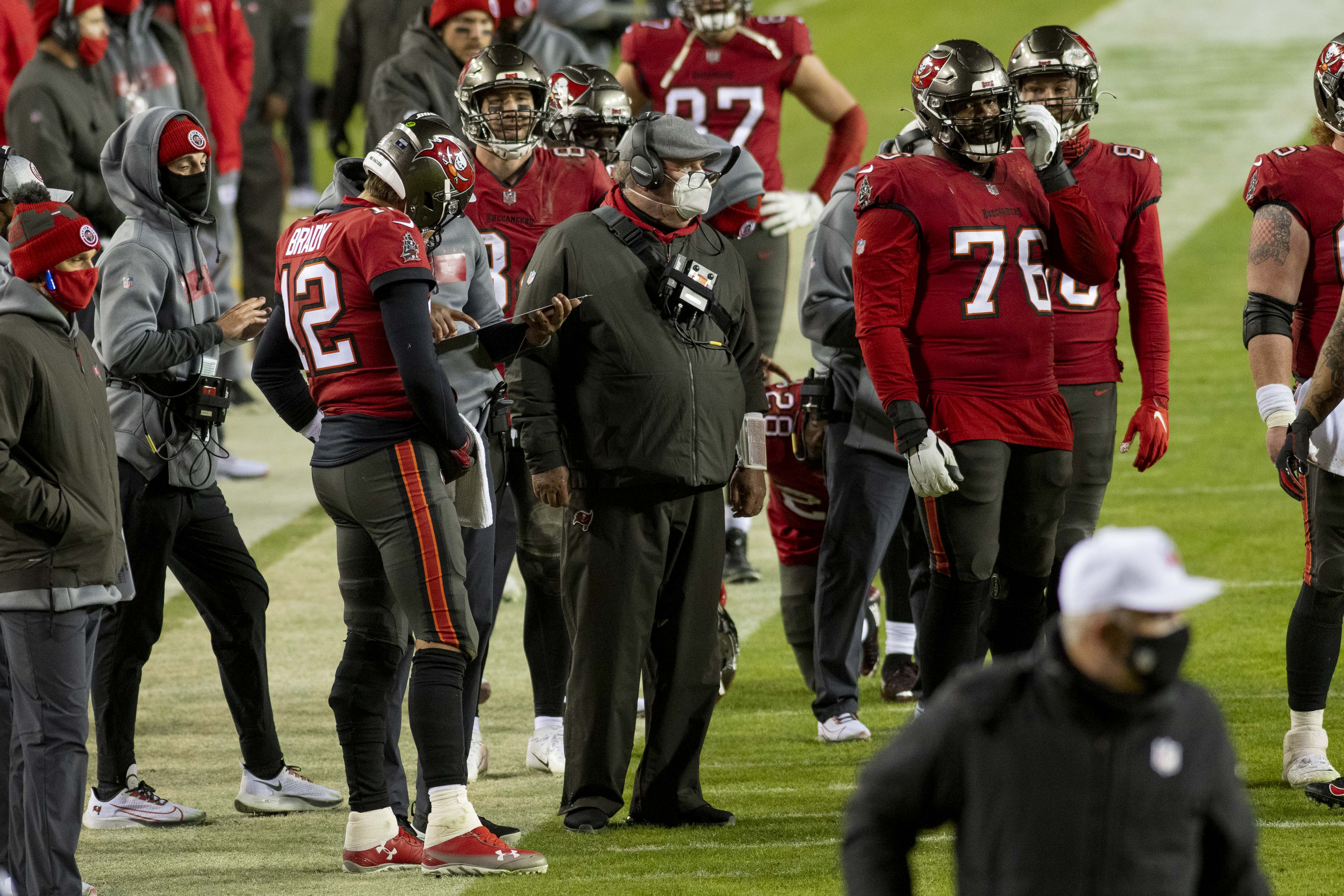
Bruce Arians and Tom Brady in the 2020 Wild Card game against the Washington Football Team

After the termination of Dirk Koetter, the Buccaneers named Bruce Arians as the 12th head coach in franchise history on January 8, 2019. Arians had been retired from coaching for a year, having spent the 2018 season in the broadcast booth. Because Arians was still under contract with the Arizona Cardinals through the end of the 2019 season, Tampa Bay agreed to give the Cardinals a sixth-round pick in the 2019 NFL draft for the rights to Arians, as well as receiving Arizona's seventh-round pick in the same draft. On the same day it was reported the Buccaneers would also bring Byron Leftwich, who had served under Arians in Arizona, as offensive coordinator. The next day the Buccaneers announced the hiring of former Jets head coach Todd Bowles as defensive coordinator.

In 2019, Tampa Bay finished with a 7–9 record. The team finished the season with the best run defense in the league and top 10 in total offense. Jameis Winston, in the final year of his five-year contract, set franchise records with 5,109 passing yards and 33 touchdown passes. He became the eighth quarterback in NFL history to eclipse 5,000 yards in a single season. However he had a league-leading 30 interceptions. He set a mark as the first quarterback in league history to throw 30 touchdown passes and 30 interceptions in the same season. His final pass attempt as a Buccaneers player was a pick-six in overtime to lose against Atlanta in Week 17. Winston was not re-signed by Tampa Bay, and he was subsequently picked up by the Saints during the 2020 offseason.

===== Super Bowl LV champions (2020) =====
The Buccaneers made arguably the biggest acquisition of the 2020 offseason when they acquired veteran quarterback Tom Brady, widely considered the greatest to ever play the position. The offensive engine of the New England Patriots' sports dynasty from 2001 to 2019, Brady announced that he would not be re-signing with the Patriots after 20 seasons and joined the Buccaneers for 2020.

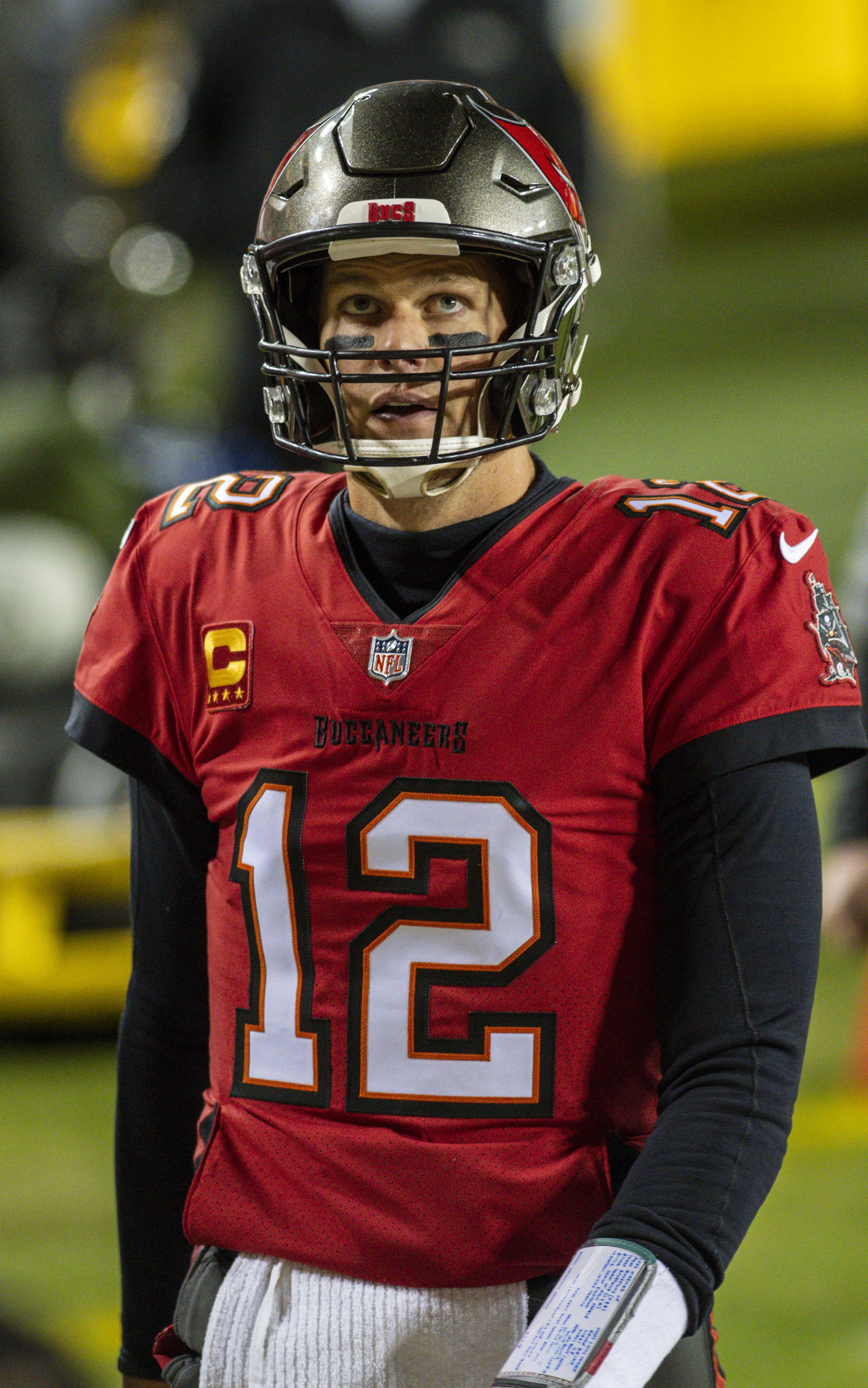
Quarterback Tom Brady left the Patriots after 20 seasons to play with the Buccaneers.

Later in the offseason, tight end and Brady's New England teammate Rob Gronkowski announced that he was coming out of retirement to return to the NFL. On the same day, the Patriots made an agreement to trade Gronkowski to the Buccaneers, along with a seventh-round pick in exchange for a compensatory fourth-round pick in the 2020 NFL draft. Gronkowski would finish the regular season with 45 receptions, 623 receiving yards, and 7 receiving touchdowns in 16 games.

On September 6, 2020, the Buccaneers signed running back Leonard Fournette, who had been waived the previous week by the Jacksonville Jaguars.

On October 27, 2020, free agent wide receiver Antonio Brown signed a one-year contract with the Buccaneers. The move reunited Brown with Arians, who was his first offensive coordinator on the Pittsburgh Steelers, and Brady, whom he played one game alongside of for the Patriots. Brown made his first appearance with the Buccaneers in week 9 and would finish the regular season with 45 receptions, 483 receiving yards, and 4 receiving touchdowns in eight games.

In Week 15, the Buccaneers overcame a 17–0 deficit against the Atlanta Falcons, to win 31–27 at Mercedes-Benz Stadium in Atlanta, Georgia.

In the 2020 season, Tampa Bay clinched their first playoff berth since 2007 after a 47–7 victory against the Lions in Week 16. By the end of the 2020 regular season, Brady had set the Buccaneers record for passing touchdowns with 40. In the same game, receiver Mike Evans set the NFL record for consecutive 1,000-yard seasons to start a career with 7 straight 1,000 yard seasons.

In the playoffs, the Buccaneers defeated the Washington Football Team 31–23 in the wild card round, their first postseason victory since winning Super Bowl XXXVII in 2002. In the divisional round, they defeated the Saints 30–20 to advance to the NFC Championship Game for the fourth time in franchise history, and first since the 2002 season. They then defeated the Packers to advance to Super Bowl LV for the franchise's second appearance in the league championship, facing the defending Super Bowl champions, the Kansas City Chiefs. The Buccaneers defeated the Chiefs to win their second Super Bowl title by a score of 31–9. Coincidentally, Raymond James Stadium was named as the host stadium of Super Bowl LV in 2017 when it was determined that SoFi Stadium, which had been awarded the game the year before its construction had begun, would not be completed in time to be eligible under league requirements to host. Thus, the Buccaneers became the first team in NFL history to play in and win a Super Bowl that was held at its home stadium.

In the 2021 offseason, the Buccaneers re-signed all 22 of their starters from the 2020 Super Bowl championship season, in addition to re-signing Fournette and former Bengals running back Giovani Bernard. The Buccaneers are the first team in the salary cap era (1994), and fourth team all-time, to re-sign all 22 starters from their Super Bowl team, while every other team's roster changed.

After the 2021 regular season, in which they posted a 13–4 record and secured the #2 seed in the NFC playoffs. The team defeated the Philadelphia Eagles 31–15 in the Wild Card Round. The Buccaneers' title defense came to an end with a 30–27 last-second loss to the eventual Super Bowl LVI champion Los Angeles Rams in the Divisional Round.

==== Todd Bowles years (2022–present) ====
On February 1, 2022, quarterback Tom Brady announced his retirement from the league. Brady had one season remaining on his contract with the Buccaneers. However, on March 13, after only forty days, he reversed his decision, and announced he would return for the 2022 season. On March 30, a couple weeks after Brady's announcement, head coach Bruce Arians announced his second retirement from coaching and shifted to Senior Football Consultant. Defensive coordinator and former Jets head coach Todd Bowles was immediately named his replacement.

Despite signing former All-Pro receiver Julio Jones, former Pro-Bowlers Akiem Hicks and Keanu Neal, and Brady's former teammates Shaq Mason and Logan Ryan, the Buccaneers struggled under Bowles in his first season as head coach. They finished 8–9, but still won the NFC South division title, the fifth sub .500 team since the merger to make the playoffs. They lost at home to the Cowboys in the Wild Card Round. On February 1, 2023, Brady announced his retirement, this time "for good".

In 2023, Tampa Bay hired Seahawks quarterbacks coach Dave Canales to be their offensive coordinator and signed Heisman Trophy winner Baker Mayfield to a one-year, $8.5 million contract to be the team's next starting quarterback. The Buccaneers won the NFC South with a 9–8 record, their third consecutive division crown. They defeated the Philadelphia Eagles in the Wild Card Round 32–9. The Buccaneers saw their season end in the Divisional Round with a 31–23 loss to the Detroit Lions.

During the 2024 offseason, Baker Mayfield signed a three-year contract extension with the Buccaneers to remain the starting quarterback. Dave Canales departed to take the head coaching job at Carolina, and was replaced at the offensive coordinator position by Liam Coen. The Buccaneers finished the regular season 10–7, and won the NFC South for a franchise-best fourth consecutive season. This also tied the record for most consecutive NFC South titles, with four, and total NFC South titles, with seven; furthermore, this marked the fifth consecutive playoff appearance for the team, both a franchise and division record. Mayfield threw 41 touchdown passes, and the Tampa Bay offense ranked third in the league. Despite missing three games due to a hamstring injury, wide receiver Mike Evans finished the regular season with 1,004 receiving yards. Evans tied the NFL record held by Jerry Rice for the most consecutive seasons with 1,000+ receiving yards (11), as well as extend his own current record for most such seasons consecutively from the start of a career. In the NFL playoffs, they were upset by the Washington Commanders by a field goal, 20–23.

The 2025 season started with a 6–2 record. After their week 9 bye, they would collapse to a 7–9 record, in part due to a rash of injuries. The Buccaneers rebounded to beat their NFC South rival Carolina Panthers in Week 18 to finish 8–9. The next day, the Atlanta Falcons' victory over rival New Orleans Saints resulted in a three-way tie for first place in the division. The Panthers won the tiebreaker, clinched the division, and the Buccaneers were eliminated from playoff contention. Head coach Todd Bowles, considered by some experts to be on the "hot seat," ultimately retained his position. However, several assistant coaches were fired, and wide receiver Mike Evans parted ways in free agency to go to the San Francisco 49ers.

== Defense ==
Throughout their history, the Buccaneers have been known for their suffocating defense. It started with the drafting of Hall of Fame defensive end Lee Roy Selmon with their first pick ever in 1976. Three Buccaneer players have been named the AP Defensive Player of the Year: Selmon, 1979; Warren Sapp, 1999; and Derrick Brooks, 2002. The team has led the league in total defense on three occasions, including the 2002 championship season. The team's defense was instrumental in their 2020 playoff run which led to their second Super Bowl title. All five of the Buccaneers Hall of Fame inductees are defensive players or coaches.

=== 1978–1982 ===
Led by Selmon, Linebackers Dewey Selmon, Richard Wood, Dave Lewis, and Mike Washington, Mark Cotney, and Cedric Brown in the secondary, the early years Buccaneers quickly earned an identity as a defensive team. Their 3–4 defense peaked in 1979 when they led the league in total defense, points allowed, and first downs allowed. Lee Roy Selmon was voted NFL Defensive Player of the Year, but they eventually fell 10 points short of the Super Bowl as the offense held them back in the NFC Championship game in a 9–0 loss to the Los Angeles Rams. Although 1980 was a down year, the unit made pass defense adjustments and returned in 1981 to finish No. 1 in Touchdowns allowed; giving up only 10 touchdowns all season.

=== 1997–2008: The Tampa 2 ===
The team drafted franchise cornerstones Franchise Player & highest paid on the team Chidi Ahanotu, and John Lynch in 1993, and Warren Sapp and Derrick Brooks in 1995 to go along with All-Pro linebacker Hardy Nickerson. That was followed by the hiring of innovative defensive coordinator Monte Kiffin in 1996. The new-look Buccaneers set the stage for one of the greatest defensive runs in NFL history. From 1997 to 2008, the Buccaneers defense finished in the league's top ten every year but one, including eight top-5 finishes, and two top-ranked efforts. Kiffin along with head coach Tony Dungy created the "Tampa 2" defense, a modified version of the established Cover 2 scheme.

Kiffin's defenses were known as gang tacklers with tremendous team speed with a front four that could pressure the quarterback consistently, fast sideline-to-sideline linebackers, and a hard-hitting secondary that caused turnovers. Many teams have copied the Tampa 2, but none have come close to the success the Buccaneers experienced led by numerous Pro Bowlers and Hall of Famers. The Tampa Bay defense featured future Hall of Famers: Derrick Brooks, John Lynch, Warren Sapp, Ronde Barber, and Pro Bowlers, Hardy Nickerson, Simeon Rice, Shelton Quarles, Donnie Abraham, and Super Bowl XXXVII MVP Dexter Jackson. Sapp and Nickerson were named to the 1990s All-Decade 2nd Team while the 2000s All-Decade Team featured Sapp and Brooks as 1st Team players and Ronde Barber on the 2nd Team.

==== 2002 defense ====
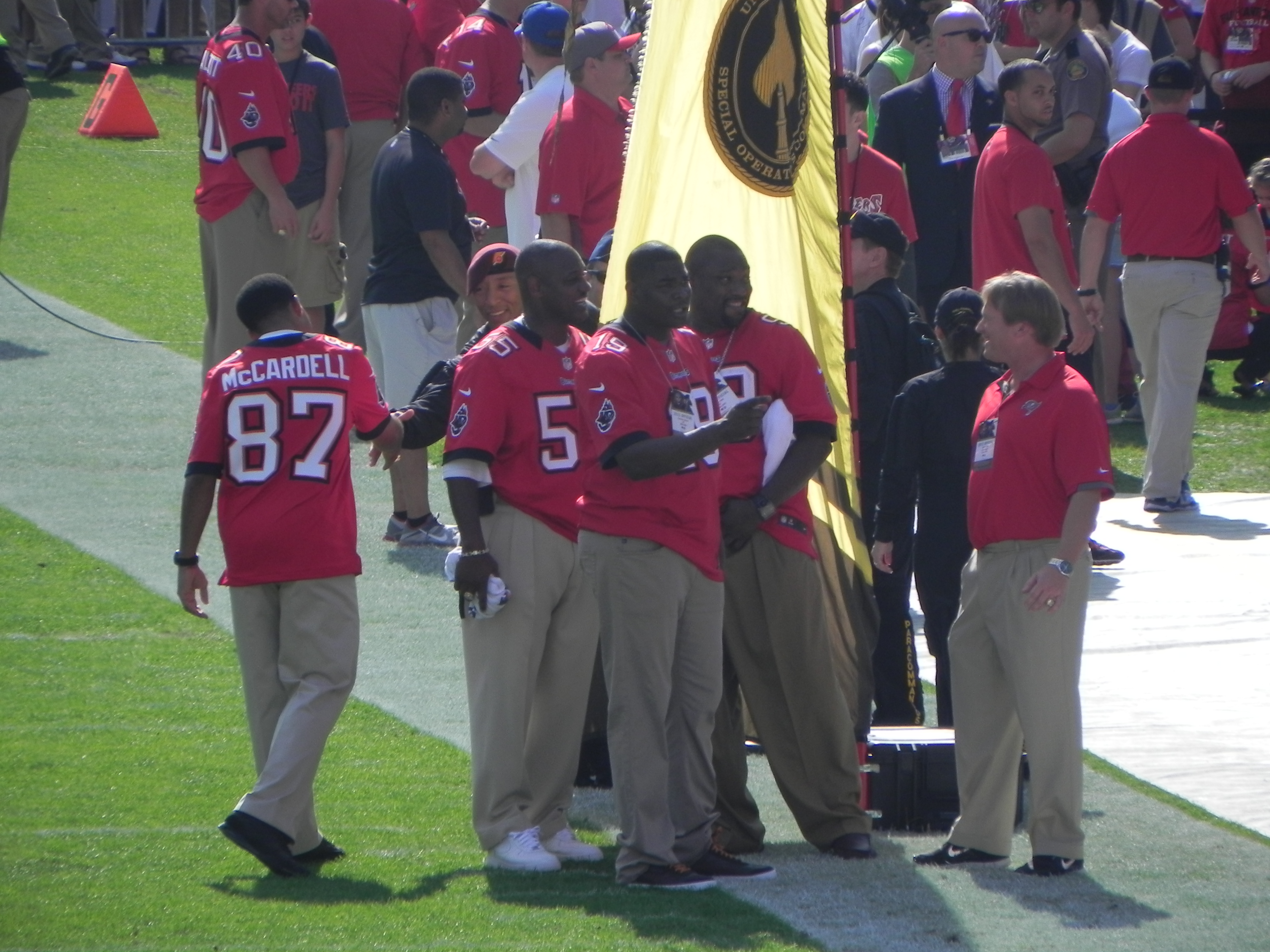
Players from the 2002 team along with head coach Jon Gruden

The 2002 Buccaneers defense is widely regarded as one of the greatest defenses in NFL history, rivaled only by the 1976 Steelers, 1985 Bears, 1986 Giants, 2000 Ravens and 2010's Seattle Seahawks. In the regular season, Tampa Bay led the league in total defense (252.8 ypg), points allowed (196), first downs allowed (14.8 pg), passing (155.6 ypg), interceptions (31), interceptions returned for touchdowns (5), opponent passer rating (48.4), and shutouts (2). They also finished third in opponent rushing average (3.8 ypc), and sixth in sacks (43). Derrick Brooks was awarded AP Defensive Player of the Year as the defense led the way to a 12–4 regular season. The team was even better in the postseason allowing only a combined 37 points in three games – all against top ten offenses. In those three playoff games, they intercepted 9 passes – returning 4 for touchdowns – and collected 11 sacks.

In Super Bowl XXXVII, the Buccaneers delivered one of the most impressive defensive performances in Super Bowl history. Playing against the #1 offense in the league led by league MVP Rich Gannon, the defense actually outscored the Raiders offense, allowing 2 offensive touchdowns while returning 3 interceptions for touchdowns. The defense set two records in the 48–21 blowout, one for most interceptions in a Super Bowl (5), and one for most interceptions returned for touchdowns in a Super Bowl (3). Defensive back Dwight Smith became the only player in Super Bowl history to record multiple interceptions returned for touchdowns in a Super Bowl, while fellow defensive back Dexter Jackson was awarded Super Bowl MVP for his two interceptions in the game. In 19 total games in 2002, the Buccaneers recorded 40 interceptions, 53 sacks, and 9 defensive touchdowns.

=== 2019–present: Todd Bowles' 3–4 defense ===
When Arians was hired by the Bucs, he appointed former New York Jets head coach Todd Bowles to be the team's defensive coordinator. That same offseason, the team drafted linebacker Devin White with the fifth overall pick in the 2019 NFL draft, after signing outside linebacker Shaquil Barrett to a one-year, $4 million contract, and defensive end Ndamukong Suh for one year, $10 million. With these acquisitions, along with linebackers Lavonte David, Carl Nassib, Jason Pierre-Paul, nose tackles Vita Vea and Beau Allen and defensive end William Gholston, Bowles implemented the 3–4 defensive scheme, with a heavy emphasis on blitzing. David and White were the teams' leaders, Barrett led the team, and the league, in sacks with 19.5, and the 2019 Buccaneers finished No. 1 in the league in run defense. The team's defense improved next season after Suh, Barrett, and Pierre-Paul were re-signed and Antoine Winfield Jr. was drafted in the second round of the 2020 NFL draft. The Buccaneers defense was a massive part of the teams' turn-around in 2020, finishing 1st in run defense, 7th in pass defense and 8th in total defense. The Buccaneers pass defense improved 29th to 7th, thanks in part to their young secondary, led by Carlton Davis, Sean Murphy-Bunting, Jordan Whitehead, Winfield Jr., Ross Cockrell, Herb Miller and Mike Edwards. Nicknamed, the "Grave Diggers", they forced two interceptions, including a pick-six by Jamel Dean, four sacks and gave up no touchdowns against 2020 NFL MVP Aaron Rodgers in Week 6, forced three interceptions against future Hall of famer Drew Brees, and five sacks and another interception against Rodgers in the NFC Championship Game. In Super Bowl LV, against the league's No. 1 offense led by 2018 NFL MVP Patrick Mahomes, the Buccaneers held Kansas City to season lows in points and red zone attempts, with 9 points, all from field goals, 22 first downs, and 0–3 red zone attempts. They forced two interceptions, three sacks, 29 pressures, and five quarterback hits, and a 49.9 passer rating during the game. In 19 total games in 2020, the Buccaneers recorded 18 interceptions, 58 sacks, 19 forced fumbles, and 12 fumble recoveries.

== Facilities ==
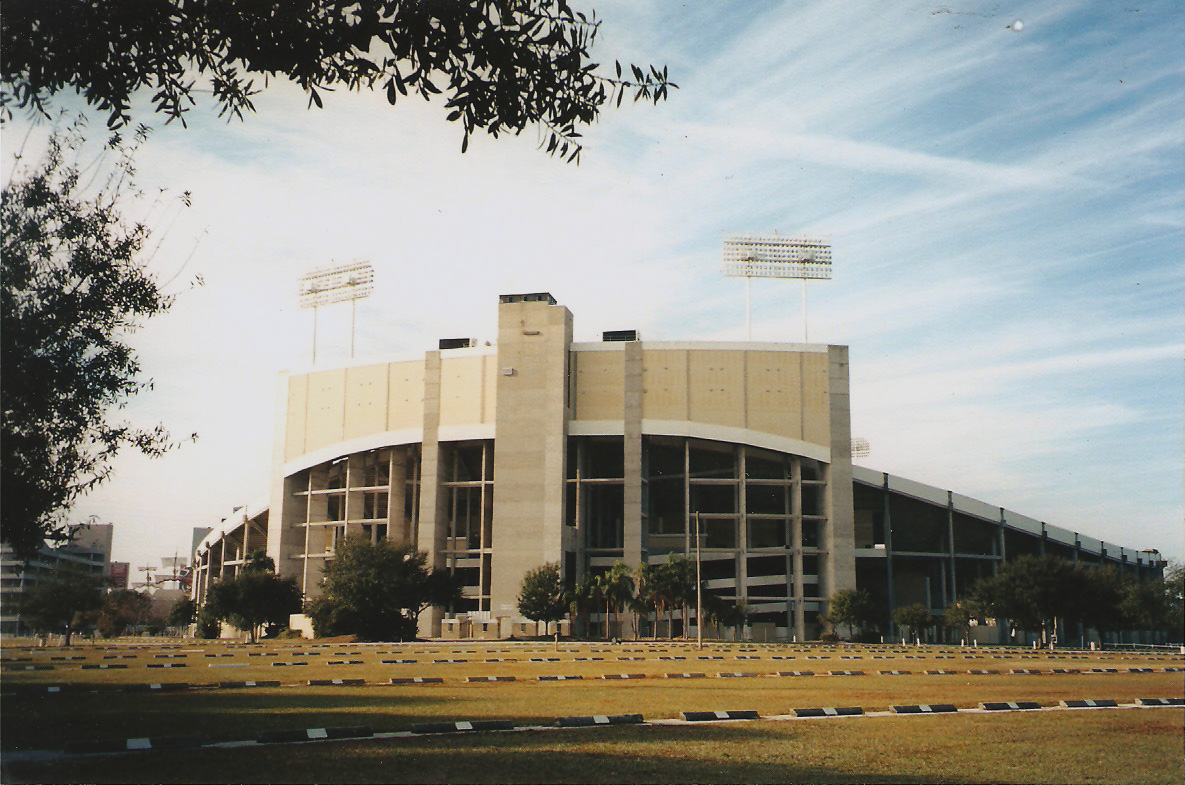
Tampa Stadium, where the Buccaneers played for their first 22 seasons

The Buccaneers played their home games at Tampa Stadium until 1998, when they moved to Raymond James Stadium in Tampa.

In 1975, the Buccaneers built a small practice complex with offices near Tampa International Airport called One Buccaneer Place—often shorted to "One Buc Place". The team used the unspectacular facility through 2005. It sat across the street from International Plaza and Bay Street, and backed up to the runways of the airport. It was located about two miles away from Tampa Stadium. As other NFL clubs began replacing and upgrading their respective facilities, Buccaneers players and coaches stepped up their complaints about the constant aircraft noise, cramped offices, small locker rooms, infestations, and decrepit condition of One Buc Place. Then-head coach Jon Gruden sarcastically referred to the facility as "The Woodshed"; some of the coaches' offices were converted broom closets. The frequent summertime rain sent the team to practice in a nearby parking garage. Some players and staff claim to have come down with illnesses from spending too much time in the building. For much of the team's existence, the Buccaneers held training camp on the University of Tampa campus, then at the expansive and better-equipped Disney's Wide World of Sports Complex near Orlando (2002–2008).

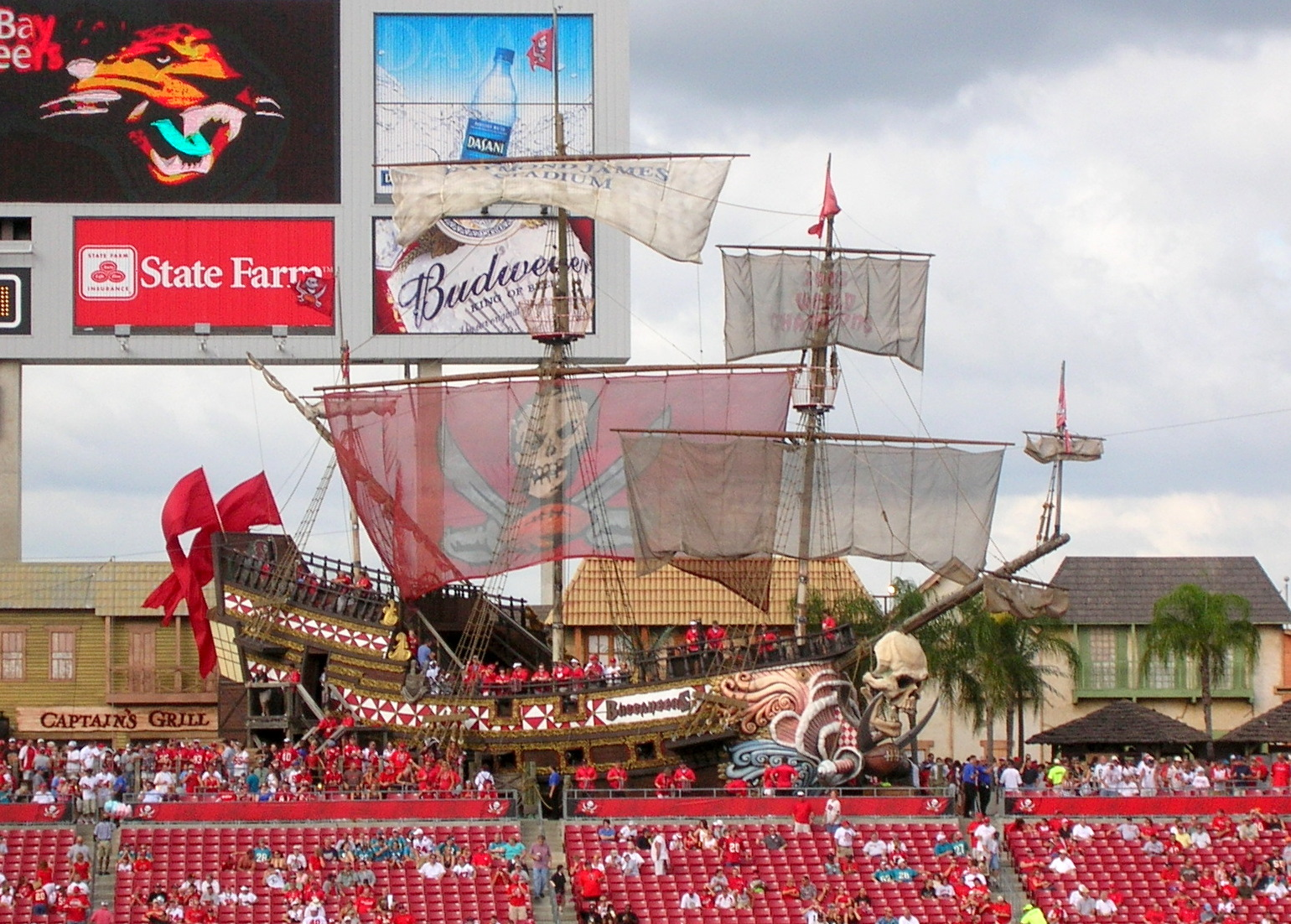
The pirate ship at Raymond James Stadium

In August 2006, the Buccaneers unveiled a $30 million training facility located across the street from Raymond James Stadium (on the former site of Tampa Bay Center). The state-of-the-art 145,000-square-foot (13,500 m^{2}) facility on 33 acres (13 ha) is one of the largest in the NFL. It includes offices and meeting rooms, three natural grass practice fields, a theater for meetings and press conferences, an expanded weight room, a fully equipped kitchen and dining room, a rehabilitation center with three pools and a locker room twice the size of the former location. The building has a five-story glass and steel football. In 2009, the team began holding training camp at this new complex.

In September 2007, statues of important figures from the Buccaneers 2002 championship season were moved into the lobby area in an exhibit called "Moment of Victory". The life-size statues included players Mike Alstott, Ronde Barber, Derrick Brooks, Brad Johnson, John Lynch, Shelton Quarles, Simeon Rice, Warren Sapp, and head coach Jon Gruden. The statues are modeled after images from the sideline towards the end of Super Bowl XXXVII.

An adjacent climate-controlled indoor practice facility with an artificial turf field was added in 2017.

Initially, the facility might have been unnamed, but for over a decade, it simply was referred to as "One Buc Place", the same name as the old building. In 2018, the facility was named AdventHealth Training Facility, as part of a ten-year naming rights deal with AdventHealth.

== Logos and uniforms ==
=== Logos ===
Since their inception in 1976, the Buccaneers have gone through two distinct logo/uniform eras. From 1976 to 1996, the team used orange, red, and white uniforms with a "Bucco Bruce" logo. Since 1997, the team has used red and pewter uniforms, with a "skull and swords" logo.

The original "Bucco Bruce" logo has seen three distinct versions. The original version was the most distinctive, both in color and design. The logo was refreshed in 1992 with the most obvious differences being the design of the face, specifically the open eye, the design on the dagger, and the usage of white near the neck of the first design. The 2009 throwback uniforms used a cleaned up and crisper version of the 1976–1991 logo. From 1997 onwards, the Buccaneers' newer "skulls and swords" logo has gone through three iterations. The first was somewhat smaller on the helmet, and featured a more conventionally-shaped skull. The second edition was larger on the helmet, had a different shade of red, and a different design for the shape and face of the skull. The current version is mostly the same as the second, with only minor changes, including a smaller size on the helmet.

=== 1976 ===
There were four different versions of uniforms between 1976 and 1996.

Shortly after the franchise was awarded, in February 1975 the team name of "Buccaneers" was selected, along with proposed team colors of green, orange and white. The name was said to be reminiscent of José Gaspar and the Buccaneers of the Caribbean Sea, and the color orange representing the Florida citrus industry. Almost immediately, the nickname "Bucs" became popular, but the alternative "Bay Bucs" failed to gain traction.

A few months later, however, green was dropped from the color scheme. The artists' renditions were too similar to the aqua used by the Miami Dolphins, as well as the green shades used by the Miami Hurricanes and Florida A&M. While they desired to keep the primary color orange, which provided a popular visual link to the Gators, Hurricanes, and Florida A&M, they sought to further distinguish themselves. The color red as an accent color was substituted, as a gesture to the former Tampa Spartans and loosely, to the Florida State Seminoles. The orange/red/white combination was now a composite of all major college teams in the state at the time. Officially speaking, the club's colors during this time period were Florida orange, red, and white.

Long-time Tampa Tribune cartoonist and Ye Mystic Krewe of Gasparilla member Lamar Sparkman designed the first team logo. Faced with the challenge of designing a logo that did not closely resemble that of the other "pirates" in the league, the Raiders, Sparkman came up with a moustached pirate wearing a plumed slouch hat, with a large hoop earring in his left ear and clutching a dagger in his teeth. The pirate appeared to be winking. Sparkman decided to portray the character not as a "hairy-legged slob", but more of gallant, swashbuckling, and rakish, "classy" type. The eye wink was used rather than an eyepatch, since the Raiders' logo already depicted a patch over one eye. For a very brief time he was referred to as "Morgan", and coach John McKay called him "Errol Flynn". Local St. Petersburg Times sportswriter Hubert Mizell coined the somewhat belittling nickname "Bucco Bruce" in a February 1976 column, noting almost immediately the mascot's unintimidating and "cavalier" appearance. The nickname stuck, while the logo and the name "Bucco Bruce" became symbols and reminders of the club's ongoing futility. Sports writer and commentator Nick Bakay once said that Bucco Bruce was a pirate who "struck fear in the hearts of no one".

The original home uniforms featured orange jerseys with white numerals outlined in red, white trousers, and striped socks. These are the now-infamous "Creamsicle uniforms", so named from the perceived similarity of the uniform's appearance to the ice cream snack. Road white jerseys had orange numerals outlined in red. During their first season in 1976, however, the orange jerseys were only used for preseason games. The Buccaneers wore their white jerseys for all 14 regular season games. After the 1976 season, the team would not see striped socks again until they began wearing them as throwback uniforms starting in 2009.

=== 1977–1991 ===
After only one season, the original orange numerals (with red outline) for the white "away" jerseys were reversed. For 1977 and beyond, the white jerseys were revised to have red numerals with an orange outline. The color swap provided better visibility, especially for television coverage purposes. The striped socks were dropped.

During the 1985 season, the team wore a special patch marking their tenth season. In 1989, 1990, and 1991, the Buccaneers elected to wear white at home in an attempt to accommodate quarterback Vinny Testaverde's color blindness. In 1988, Testaverde had thrown a post-merger NFL-record 35 interceptions, which some attributed to the darker (orange) jerseys. During the offseason, head coach Ray Perkins made the decision to switch to the all-white uniforms, citing his quarterback's vision issues, but also taking into account the heat, and claimed that players look "bigger" when wearing white.

Beloit College, located in Beloit, Wisconsin, received a notice from the Tampa Bay Buccaneers of the college's illegitimate use of their mascot. Beloit College's buccaneer is the mirror image of the Tampa Bay buccaneer, with the creamsicle colors replaced with Beloit's school colors. Athletic Director Ed DeGeorge said Beloit's Buccaneers have used the logo since the early 1980s, when he chose it from a book while ordering decals for the football team's helmets. The NFL's Buccaneers joined the league in 1976. However, the Buccaneers withdrew their claim against Beloit College because of the independent decision to redesign the logo.

=== 1992–1996 ===
In 1992, the Bucco Bruce logo was redrawn, yielding a crisper and larger version that would be used for five seasons. A simultaneous uniform refresh introduced new orange trousers to be paired with the white jerseys, which now featured an orange collar. The Buccaneers utilized the white-on-orange combination for the vast majority of regular season and preseason games (both home and away) during this period. The orange-on-white combination was used sparingly, mainly for primetime games, some late-season games, and away games in which the hosting team chose to wear white at home. The white-on-white combination was rarely used.

Before the team's season finale in 1995 against the Lions, coach Sam Wyche suggested that the Buccaneers wear the orange pants with their orange jerseys. The idea was vetoed by, among others, Pro Bowl linebacker Hardy Nickerson.

For the 1993 season, the Buccaneers added a commemorative patch to the right sleeve of their uniforms, which read "Mr C" in cursive script. It was in recognition of owner Hugh Culverhouse, who was battling terminal lung cancer. For 1994, the Buccaneers carried the league-wide NFL 75th anniversary patch, and as part of the "throwback" theme of the season, wore white jerseys with white pants on two occasions.

Shortly after Malcom Glazer purchased the franchise in January 1995, ownership announced that they were planning to introduce new team colors, logos, and uniforms. Ownership hoped to switch to new uniforms as early as the 1995 season, however the NFL informed them that it was too late to do so at that time. A formal uniform switch request was then submitted to the league and tentatively scheduled to take effect for the 1996 season. Team officials and the NFL Properties department began to research a new design. The local newspaper even held an informal design contest to raise awareness and generate publicity. In the meantime, however, the talks for a new stadium had stalled, leaving open the chance that the franchise might relocate to another city. As a result, the uniform change was postponed. In March 1996, it was announced that the orange "Creamsicle" uniforms would be used for at least another year until the stadium plans were ironed out.

=== 1997–2013 ===
The Buccaneers began wearing the throwback orange, red, and white uniforms during the 2009 season.

A ballot measure to fund the construction of a new stadium passed in September 1996. As a result, the franchise was guaranteed to stay in Tampa, and the plans to design a new uniform were resurrected and reenergized. The Buccaneers worked with the NFL to develop a more marketable and intimidating look in order to improve the team's image. Starting with the 1997 season, the primary team colors were changed to red and pewter, with black and orange as accents. The "Bucco Bruce" logo was replaced by a red wind-swept flag displaying a white pirate skull and crossed sabres which is a modified version of the Crossed Swords Jolly Roger. The flagpole was another larger sabre. The "Buccaneers" team name was written in a new font, Totally Gothic, and was either red with shadows of pewter or red and white. Orange pinstriping, and an orange football, were used to maintain a visual link to the former colors. Chris Berman nicknamed them "the pirates in pewter pants", a play on the Gilbert and Sullivan opera The Pirates of Penzance. The nickname "Pewter Pirates" also became trendy. The Buccaneers staged a ceremony at The Pier on April 7, 1997, in which Bucco Bruce walked the plank of the pirate ship Bounty docked in Tampa Bay. But not before he was pardoned at the last minute by Governor Lawton Chiles.

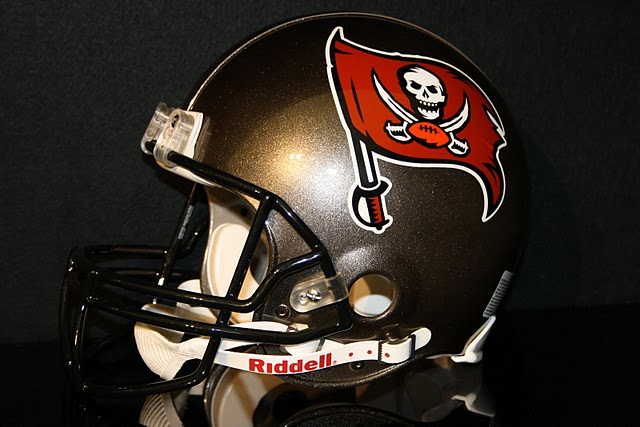
The club's helmet as worn from 1997 to 2013

The 1997 logo was loosely inspired by the Crossed Swords Jolly Roger.

The new uniforms were adopted while Raymond James Stadium was still under construction, and the new colors would be prominent at the new facility. This new color scheme loosely resembled that of the Tampa Bay Bandits, the USFL team that played in the region during their three-season existence from 1983 to 1985. That team had a color scheme of red, silver, black, and white.

The new uniforms provided a combination of either red or white jerseys with either pewter or white trousers. The white-on-white combination has been used numerous times during the preseason and for early regular season games. The red-on-white combination has been used sparingly, for some prime time home games or special occasions. Most games, home and away, have used pewter trousers.

For 2005, the uniform featured a patch commemorating the club's 30th season. In 2014, a circular patch was worn with the initials "MG", after the death of owner Malcolm Glazer. For 2015, a patch commemorating the club's 40th season was worn.

Like many other NFL teams located in subtropical climates, the Buccaneers customarily wear their white road jerseys at home during the first half of the season – forcing opponents to wear their darker colors during the hot summers and autumns in Tampa. Additionally, the visitors' bench of Raymond James Stadium is located on the east side of the stadium, which is in direct sunlight for games that kick off at 1:00 p.m. Eastern, whereas the west (home) sideline is in the shade. In certain previous years, such as 1989, 1990, 1991, and 1996 – the last year of the original uniforms, the Buccaneers generally wore white at home for the entire season including preseason. Since the new uniforms were adopted, the Buccaneers typically wear their red jerseys for home games during the second half of the season, and for most nighttime home games. They have also worn red jerseys all four times as the home team in International Series games. During the preseason, the Buccaneers usually wear white for their home games. Since the 1997 season, the Buccaneers have worn both their red jerseys (5 times) and white jerseys (4 times) for home postseason games. At Super Bowl XXXVII, in which Tampa Bay was the designated home team, they elected to wear their red home jerseys. This was despite the kickoff temperature of 81 °F (27 °C), one of the hottest Super Bowls on record.

The Buccaneers' 1997 uniform change prompted a 2003 lawsuit by the Raiders, who claimed that the NFL and the Buccaneers had infringed upon key trademark elements of the Raiders' brand, including the Raiders' pirate logo. In the same suit, the Raiders challenged the Carolina Panthers' color scheme, which included silver and black. The Raiders wanted the courts to bar the Buccaneers and Panthers from wearing their uniforms while playing in California. However, since the lawsuit was filed in a California state court, the lawsuit was tossed out because only federal courts have jurisdiction on intellectual property issues.

=== 2014–2019 ===
With a new uniform change in 2020, these official uniforms were worn for six seasons.

The Buccaneers unveiled a revised logo and helmet on February 20, 2014. This was followed two weeks later on March 3, with the unveiling of new uniforms to be used starting in the 2014 season. The jersey numbers featured a high visibility reflective outline, the helmet logo was revamped and enlarged, the helmet itself was a darker shade of pewter, and the facemask had a chrome-effect coating. The original Creamsicle shade of orange was reintroduced as accent trim. The reaction to the newer uniforms was mixed. Of note, the jersey numbers were derisively compared to digital alarm clock numerals. Different color sock combinations were used with white and colored uniforms, almost always being pewter or red; however, there were two occasions in 2014 when orange socks were used for two different weeks.

Like the 1997–2013 version, the new 2014 uniforms could be worn as combinations of red or white jerseys paired with either pewter or white trousers. As before, the Buccaneers typically wore their white jerseys at home during the first half of the season, and their red jerseys at home during the second half of the season as well as for night games.

In 2015, the Buccaneers debuted a Color Rush uniform featuring red jerseys and red trousers, with pewter numerals.

=== 2020–present ===
The Buccaneers unveiled three new jersey designs on April 7, 2020. The new uniform designs evoke the club's 1997–2013 design, while incorporating modern design elements from the 2014 uniform refresh, including the enlarged flag-and-crossed-swords logo, the newer shade of pewter, as well as the modern ship design logo on the sleeves. While the Buccaneers kept the familiar red and white jerseys with either white or pewter pants, they changed their "Color Rush" alternate uniform to an all-pewter combination.

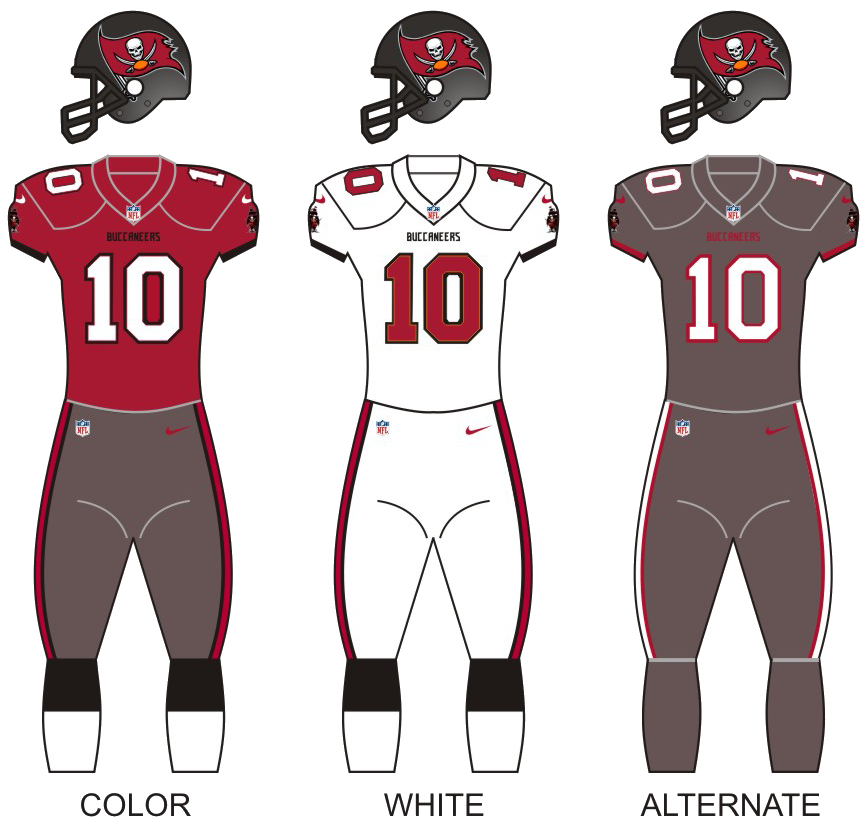
Uniforms used since 2020. The all-pewter uniform would be worn until 2023, when it was replaced by the 1976 throwback uniforms.

For Super Bowl LV held at Raymond James Stadium, Tampa Bay was the designated home team, the first team in NFL history to play in a Super Bowl in their own stadium. They elected to wear their road white jerseys with pewter trousers, instead of their red jerseys, citing the success they had enjoyed during the season in that combination. Tampa Bay routed Kansas City 31–9, giving them a Super Bowl win in both their red jerseys (XXXVII) and their white jerseys (LV).

During the 2020 season, the Buccaneers finished with a 6–0 record wearing their newer white jersey/pewter pants combination, including three postseason victories over New Orleans, Green Bay, and Kansas City, respectively. They were first introduced in their Week 6 game against Green Bay, a 38–10 win at Raymond James Stadium. A renewed interest in wearing white jerseys at home saw Tampa Bay schedule six of eight 2021 home games with white (up from the typical four), plus home playoff games in the Wild Card and Divisional rounds with white/pewter as well.

During the 2025 season, a 50th season patch was worn across all uniforms. Three versions of the anniversary patch were used. A red version with the skull & swords logo was used on the red jerseys. A white version with the skull & swords logo was carried when wearing the white away jerseys. A white and orange version of the patch, with the Bucco Bruce logo, was worn on the two throwback uniforms.

=== Throwback uniform ===
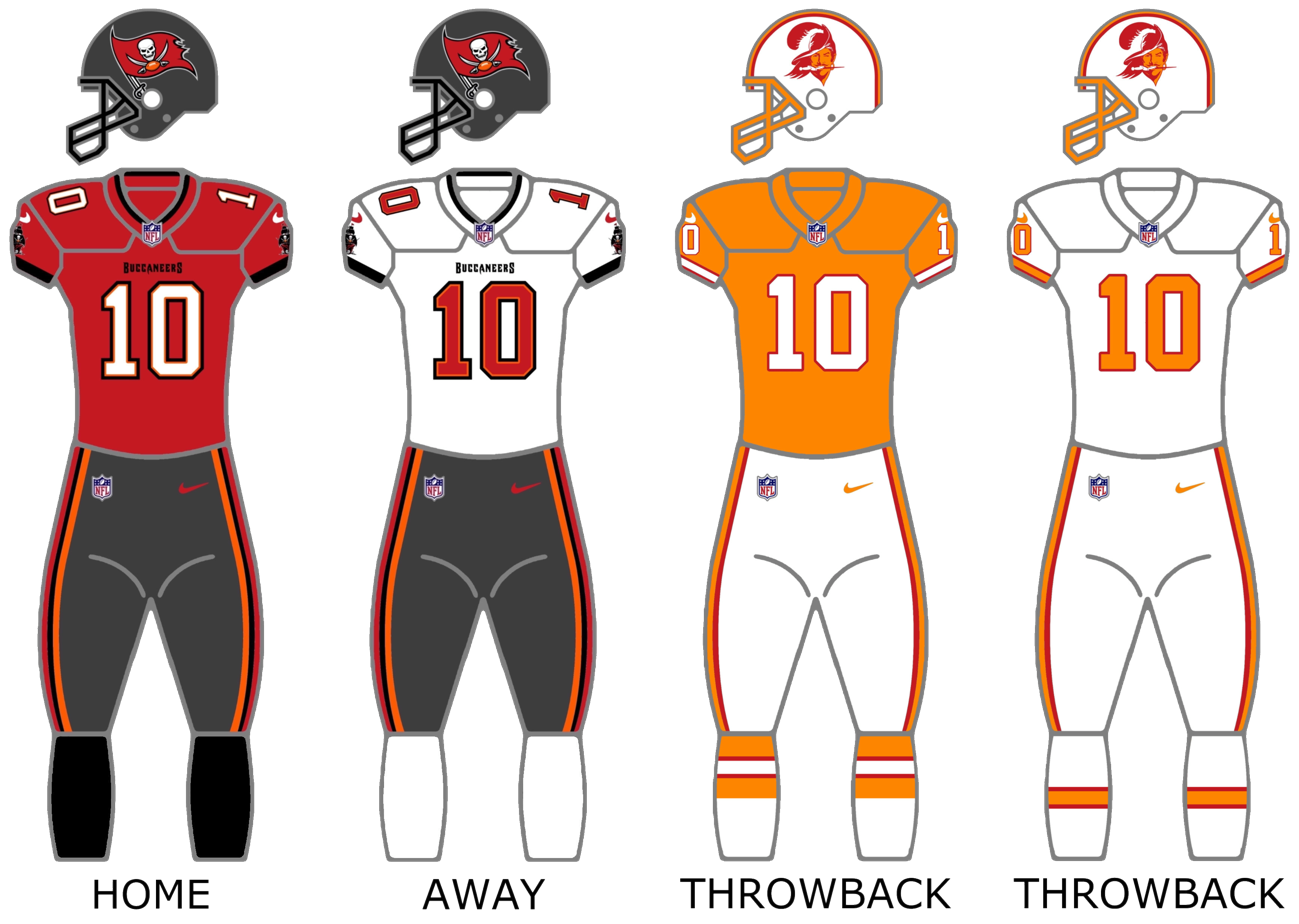
2025 uniform lineup, which includes two throwbacks: the orange "Creamsicle" and white ′76 Uniform.

After their uniform change in 1997, the Buccaneers did not wear the old orange uniforms, even during popular league-sponsored "throwback" weekends. The old uniforms were mostly eschewed by the club, and the sale of team merchandise in the old color scheme was embargoed for several years. Fans' opinions of the old uniforms were equally negative. However, after over a decade, there was a renewed interest in the old uniforms, as throwbacks and other alternate uniforms across the league were becoming increasingly popular. In 2008, the team revealed that they would be wearing orange throwback uniforms for one game in the 2009 season. Their use was in conjunction with the creation of a Buccaneers Ring of Honor, celebrating the 30th anniversary of the 1979 division championship team.

Throwback merchandise went on sale in the summer of 2009, and referred to the orange color not as "Florida Orange", but as "Orange Glaze". Considerable research was done using photographs and old uniforms to match the original color schemes. The dagger-biting pirate was given a cleaned-up look, and the orange, red, and white uniforms debuted against the Packers (Tampa Bay's former division rival) on November 8, 2009. Raymond James Stadium was also transformed via orange banners and classic field logos and fonts back to the classic Tampa Stadium look of the late 1970s. The Buccaneers won their first throwback game behind rookie quarterback Josh Freeman's first-career NFL start. The throwback game was to become an annual tradition, but went on hiatus after 2012 due to league-wide safety restrictions requiring players wear the same helmet throughout the season. After changes in league policies, the throwback uniforms returned in 2023.

Ahead of the 2025 season, to celebrate the franchise's 50th season, the Buccaneers unveiled a second throwback uniform based on the team's 1976 regular season uniforms. Dubbed the ′76 Uniform, it features white jerseys and white trousers, orange block numerals outlined in red, red-orange-red sleeve stripes, the "Bucco Bruce" helmet, and a 50th season patch. Tampa Bay wore the ′76 Uniform in Week 3 against the Jets, and at Seattle in Week 5. The ′76 Uniforms were widely praised, and the Buccaneers won both games in which they were used. Later in the season the Buccaneers also wore their orange throwback jerseys, for a total of three throwback games in 2025. As a result, the all-pewter color rush uniform, last worn in 2023, was put on temporary hiatus – in order to comply with the NFL's two-alternate/throwback uniform limit.

Originally, the ′76 Uniforms were planned to be used for only one season, but by popular demand, it was announced that they would be brought back for one game in 2026. The 2026 version will be nearly identical to that of 2025, minus the 50th anniversary patch, and adding stitched lettering of "Hey! Hey! Tampa Bay!" on the jersey collar, in reference to the 1979 fight song. In addition, the solid orange jersey throwbacks will not be used in 2026, which instead will allow them to bring back the all-pewter color rush uniform for one game.

The Buccaneers are 3–6 all-time in throwback games.

== Seasons, facts and records ==
=== Records ===
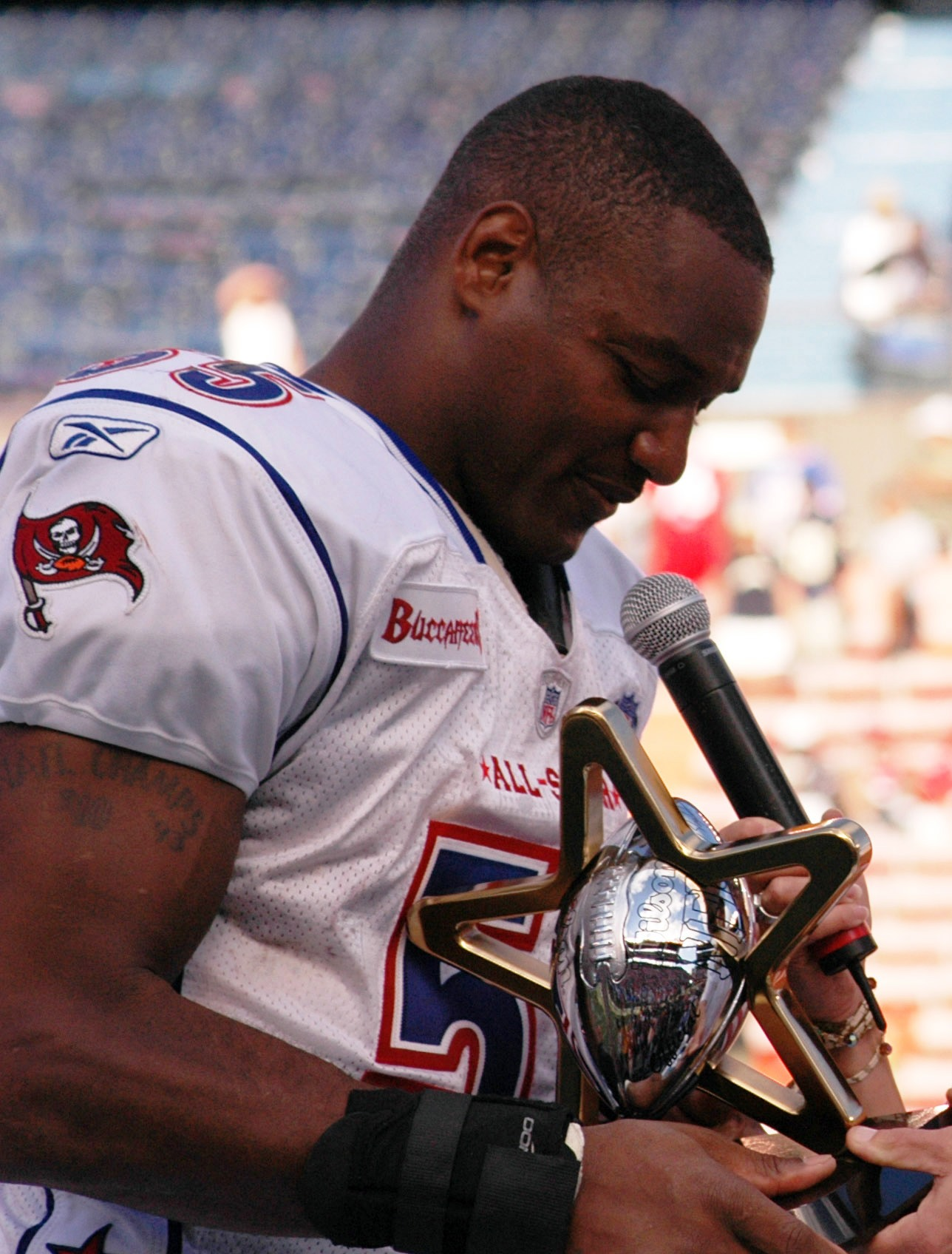
Derrick Brooks played a key role in the defensive records that the Bucs hold.

- The first post-merger expansion team to win a division title, a playoff game, and to host and play in a conference championship game, which was accomplished during the 1979 season.
- The first post-merger expansion team to reach and win a Super Bowl, which was accomplished during the 2002 season at Super Bowl XXXVII.
- The first team since the merger to complete a winning season when starting ten or more rookies (2010).
- 50 consecutive games with at least one sack and one forced turnover. The streak ended on November 16, 2003, against Green Bay.
- The first NFL franchise to play in (and win) a Super Bowl held in their home stadium (Super Bowl LV).
- Tied the record held by the Saints for most consecutive NFC South division titles with four (2021–2024). A record five consecutive playoff appearances (2020–2024) for a team in the NFC South since its inception in 2002.
- The first NFL franchise since the start of the salary cap era to bring back every free agent starter from their Super Bowl roster.
- Nine consecutive wins (including playoffs) while scoring 30 or more points.
- The last NFL team to have never returned a kickoff for a touchdown during the regular season (or postseason), which ended on December 16, 2007, when Micheal Spurlock returned the 1,865th try 90 yards for a score in Week 15 against Atlanta.
- Mike Evans shares the NFL record with Jerry Rice for most consecutive seasons with 1,000+ receiving yards (11). Evans' eleven consecutive seasons is also the NFL record for most consecutive such seasons to start a career.
- Three Tampa Bay quarterbacks have posted a perfect passer rating. On December 17, 2023, Baker Mayfield became the first visiting quarterback ever to register a perfect 158.3 passer rating against Green Bay at Lambeau Field.
- In 2025, Tampa Bay became the first team in NFL history to win the first three games of the season with game-winning scores in the final minute of all three games. They later became the first team to win their first four games with game-winning scores in the final minute, and the first team with four wins by 3 or fewer points in their first five games.

== Players of note ==
=== Current roster ===
Tampa Bay Buccaneers roster
Quarterbacks (QB): 10 Jalon Daniels; 6 Baker Mayfield; 16 Easton Stick; Running backs (RB): 1 Kenneth Gainwell; 7 Bucky Irving; 44 Sean Tucker KR; Wide receivers (WR): 2 Emeka Egbuka; 14 Chris Godwin; 17 Ted Hurst; 19 Kameron Johnson RS; 15 Tez Johnson; Tight ends (TE): 87 Payne Durham; 41 Ko Kieft; 88 Cade Otton; 84 Bauer Sharp	Offensive linemen (OL): 62 Graham Barton C; 68 Ben Bredeson G; 70 Ben Chukwuma T; 65 Dan Feeney G; 67 Luke Goedeke T; 64 Trevor Keegan G; 69 Cody Mauch G; 75 Billy Schrauth G; 77 Justin Skule T; 78 Tristan Wirfs T; Defensive linemen (DL): 90 DeMonte Capehart DT; 94 Calijah Kancey DT; 56 Rakeem Nuñez-Roches NT; 95 Elijah Roberts DT; 91 A'Shawn Robinson DT; 92 Elijah Simmons NT; 50 Vita Vea NT	Linebackers (LB): 34 Alex Anzalone ILB; 3 Rueben Bain Jr. OLB; 8 SirVocea Dennis ILB; 0 YaYa Diaby OLB; 97 Al-Quadin Muhammad OLB; 98 Anthony Nelson OLB; 45 Josiah Trotter ILB; 51 David Walker OLB; Defensive backs (DB): 24 Ayden Garnes CB; 29 Miles Killebrew S; 38 Kevin Knowles CB; 27 Zyon McCollum CB; 5 Ifeatu Melifonwu S; 21 Benjamin Morrison CB; 25 Jacob Parrish CB; 22 Keionte Scott; 23 Tykee Smith S; 31 Antoine Winfield Jr. S; Special teams (ST): 86 Evan Deckers LS; 9 Riley Dixon P; 4 Chase McLaughlin K	Practice squad: 82 CJ Dippre TE; 46 Caden Fordham LB; 85 Garrett Greene WR; 72 Luke Haggard G; 57 Yasir Holmes OLB; 93 Jayson Jones NT; 61 Henry Lutovsky G; 81 Dean Patterson WR; 83 Eric Rivers WR; 36 J. J. Roberts S; 76 Paul Rubelt T (IPP); -- Cooper Rush QB; 66 Ben Scott G; 80 David Sills WR; 33 Silas Walters S; 18 Josh Williams RB; 48 Javin Wright LB; Reserve: 32 Josh Hayes CB (IR); 59 Mohamed Kamara OLB (IR); 11 Jalen McMillan WR (IR); 52 Christian Rozeboom ILB (IR) 53 active, 16 practice squad (1 IPP), 4 reserve As of November 16, 2026. Rookies in italics.; Roster; Depth chart; Transactions

=== Pro Football Hall of Famers ===
Tampa Bay Buccaneers in the Pro Football Hall of Fame
Players
No.	Name	Position	Tenure	Inducted
63	Lee Roy Selmon	DE	1976–1984	1995
8	Steve Young	QB	1985–1986	2005
64	Randall McDaniel	OG	2000–2001	2009
99	Warren Sapp	DT	1995–2003	2013
55	Derrick Brooks	LB	1995–2008	2014
81	Tim Brown	WR	2004	2015
47	John Lynch	S	1993–2003	2021
20	Ronde Barber	CB	1997–2012	2023
24	Darrelle Revis	CB	2013	2023
Coaches and Executives
Name		Position	Tenure	Inducted
Ron Wolf		GM/VP	1976–1978	2015
Tony Dungy		Coach	1996–2001	2016

=== Awards of Excellence ===
Pro Football Hall of Fame's Awards of Excellence
Name	Position	Tenure	Inducted
Charlie Dayton	Public relations associate	1976	2022
Jimmy Raye II	OC	1985–1986	2022
Jimmy Raye II	Senior offensive assistant	2012–2013	2022
Tom Moore	Offensive consultant	2019–2025	2023
Monte Kiffin	DC	1996–2008	2024
Dave Levy	Video producer	1988–2017	2024

=== Retired numbers ===
The Buccaneers have retired three jersey numbers, led by Lee Roy Selmon's number 63. Derrick Brooks (55) and Warren Sapp (99) had their numbers formally retired after they were inducted into the Pro Football Hall of Fame. Despite not being formally retired, the Buccaneers have not reissued 20 (Ronde Barber), 40 (Mike Alstott), or 47 (John Lynch) since those players retired from playing. This despite both Lynch and Barber also being inducted into the Hall of Fame.

Another number that has seen limited usage is 42, worn by the late Ricky Bell. Since Bell's last season in 1981, 42 has only been worn for two seasons, the most recent being in 1990. The number 12 has also not been used re-issued since Tom Brady retired in 2022, a number that was also famously worn by Doug Williams.

Tampa Bay Buccaneers retired numbers
No.	Player	Position	Tenure	Retired
55	Derrick Brooks	LB	1995–2008	September 14, 2014
63	Lee Roy Selmon	DE	1976–1984	September 15, 1986
99	Warren Sapp	DT	1995–2003	November 11, 2013

=== Individual awards ===
NFL Defensive Player of the Year
Season	Player	Position
1979	Lee Roy Selmon	DE
1999	Warren Sapp	DT
2002	Derrick Brooks	LB

Super Bowl MVP winners
Super Bowl	Player	Position
XXXVII	Dexter Jackson	S
LV	Tom Brady	QB

Pro Bowl MVP winners
Pro Bowl	Player	Position
1982	Lee Roy Selmon	DE
2006	Derrick Brooks	LB
2024	Baker Mayfield	QB
2026	Antoine Winfield Jr.	S

NFL Rookie of the Year Award
Season	Player	Position
1991	Lawrence Dawsey	WR
1992	Santana Dotson	DT
1997	Warrick Dunn	RB
2005	Cadillac Williams	RB
2015	Jameis Winston	QB

NFL Offensive Rookie of the Year Award
Season	Player	Position
1997	Warrick Dunn	RB
2005	Cadillac Williams	RB

NFL Comeback Player of the Year
Season	Player	Position
2008	Antonio Bryant	WR
2013	Darrelle Revis	CB

Maxwell Club NFL Coach of the Year
Season	Coach
1997	Tony Dungy

Bart Starr Award
Season	Player	Position
2004	Derrick Brooks	LB
2009	Warrick Dunn	RB

Byron "Whizzer" White NFL Man of the Year Award
Season	Player	Position
1997	Hardy Nickerson	LB
2003	Derrick Brooks	LB

Walter Payton NFL Man of the Year Award
Season	Player	Position
2000	Derrick Brooks	LB

The ESPYs
Year	Recipient	Award
2003	Jon Gruden	Best Coach/Manager
2021	Tom Brady	Best Male Athlete
2021	Tom Brady	Best NFL Player
2021	Buccaneers	Outstanding Team

NFL Salute to Service Award
Season	Player	Position
2015	Vincent Jackson	WR

PFWA Assistant Coach of the Year
Season	Coach	Position
2002	Monte Kiffin	DC

Deacon Jones Award
Season	Player	Position
2019	Shaquil Barrett	OLB

Bridgestone Performance Play of the Year
Season	Players
2016	Jameis Winston & Mike Evans

George S. Halas Courage Award
Season	Player	Position
2009	Matt Bryant	K

Jack Horrigan Award
Season	Player	Position
1998	Tony Dungy	HC

Sports Illustrated Sportsperson of the Year
Season	Player	Position
2021	Tom Brady	QB

FedEx Air NFL Players of the Year
Season	Player	Position
2021	Tom Brady	QB

=== NFL All-Decade and Anniversary Teams ===
Since Tampa Bay's entrance into the NFL, at least one player has been included on each NFL All-Decade Team, excluding the 1970s which Tampa Bay only had existed for four seasons. Tampa Bay has had players elected to the 1980s, 1990s, 2000s, and 2010s teams. Among the three Anniversary Teams, the franchise did not exist for the 50th Anniversary Team, no players were selected to the 75th Anniversary Team, and five players were selected to the 100th Anniversary Team. Players are only included on lists which they played for the team within the years of the decade; members, such as Tom Brady, did not join the Buccaneers until 2020, despite being a member of the 2000s and 2010s All-Decade Teams. Additionally, two players were named to The Top 100: NFL's Greatest Players in 2010, and one was named to the Sports Illustrated All-Decade Team in 2009.

NFL 1980s All-Decade Team
Player	Position	Tenure	Team
Lee Roy Selmon	DE	1976–1984	Second Team

NFL 1990s All-Decade Team
Player	Position	Tenure	Team
Warren Sapp	DT	1995–2003	Second Team
Hardy Nickerson	LB	1993–1999	Second Team
Sean Landeta	P	1997	Second Team

NFL 2000s All-Decade Team
Player	Position	Tenure	Team
Warren Sapp	DT	1995–2003	First Team
Derrick Brooks	LB	1995–2008	First Team
Ronde Barber	CB	1997–2012	Second Team
Tony Dungy	Coach	1996–2001	Second Team

NFL 2010s All-Decade Team
Player	Position	Tenure
Logan Mankins	G	2014–2015
Ndamukong Suh	DT	2019–2021
Darrelle Revis	CB	2013

NFL 100th Anniversary All-Time Team
Player	Position	Tenure
Tom Brady	QB	2020–2022
Rob Gronkowski	TE	2020–2021
Randall McDaniel	G	2000–2001
Lee Roy Selmon	DE	1976–1984
Derrick Brooks	OLB	1995–2008

The Top 100: NFL's Greatest Players
Rank	Player	Position	Tenure
97	Derrick Brooks	OLB	1995–2008
98	Lee Roy Selmon	DE	1976–1984

2000–2009 Sports Illustrated All-Decade Team
Player	Position
Derrick Brooks	LB

=== Tampa Stadium Krewe of Honor ===
In 1991, the organization initiated the "Krewe of Honor" to recognize top players, and featured a mural of the first class of three members. The display was painted in 1992 by Pat Donatelli and located on the east side of the stadium. Honorees were presented with a plaque. Quarterback Doug Williams was subsequently inducted September 6, 1992, and owner Hugh Culverhouse on September 5, 1993. No more members were added before Tampa Stadium was closed and demolished; when the stadium was demolished in 1998, so was the Krewe.

Elected to the Pro Football Hall of Fame

Tampa Stadium Krewe of Honor
Year	No.	Name	Position	Tenure
1991	63	Lee Roy Selmon	DE	1976–1984
1991	—	John McKay	Head coach	1976–1984
1991	42	Ricky Bell	RB	1977–1981
1992	12	Doug Williams	QB	1978–1982
1993	—	Hugh Culverhouse	Owner	1976–1994

=== Ring of Honor ===
On November 8, 2009, the team unveiled a new Ring of Honor at Raymond James Stadium. Hall of Fame defensive tackle, as well as the franchise's first ever draft pick, Lee Roy Selmon was the first inductee. On October 19, 2008, one year before the inception of the Ring of Honor, Mike Alstott was honored by the club after his retirement. He would be formally inducted into the ring in 2015. Former head coach Jon Gruden was inducted in 2017, but due to controversy surrounding emails he sent while working for ESPN, his name was removed in 2021. However, he was reinstated in February 2025. Due to the COVID-19 pandemic, the induction ceremony for 2020 inductee Monte Kiffin was postponed until 2021. Inductees John Lynch and Ronde Barber were both honored a second time for having subsequently been named to the Pro Football Hall of Fame.

Criteria for induction is loose, and no formal voting process is conducted. Ownership considers players, coaches, or club executives that have had "an indelible impact on the franchise". Maintaining strong ties to the team and the greater Tampa Bay community is an important factor. As of 2024, each of the players that had been named to the defunct "Krewe of Honor" have been subsequently inducted into the new Ring of Honor, with the lone exception of Ricky Bell.

The ring initially featured the player's number and last name in protruding, illuminated letters, along the frieze of the stadium's east side upper deck. The east side (visitor's side) is utilized so the ring is better visible on television. When the stadium underwent renovations in 2016–2017, the ring was refreshed to flat white letters on a red background, expanded to include both first and last names. Pro Football Hall of Fame inductees are additionally denoted by a hall of fame logo next to their names. In 2021, the ring was expanded to a second row of names along the wall below the frieze – starting with the recognition of Tampa Bay's two Super Bowl victories (2002 and 2020). When Gruden's name was re-added in 2025, it was the first name placed on the newer second row, followed by Simeon Rice, the 2025 inductee.

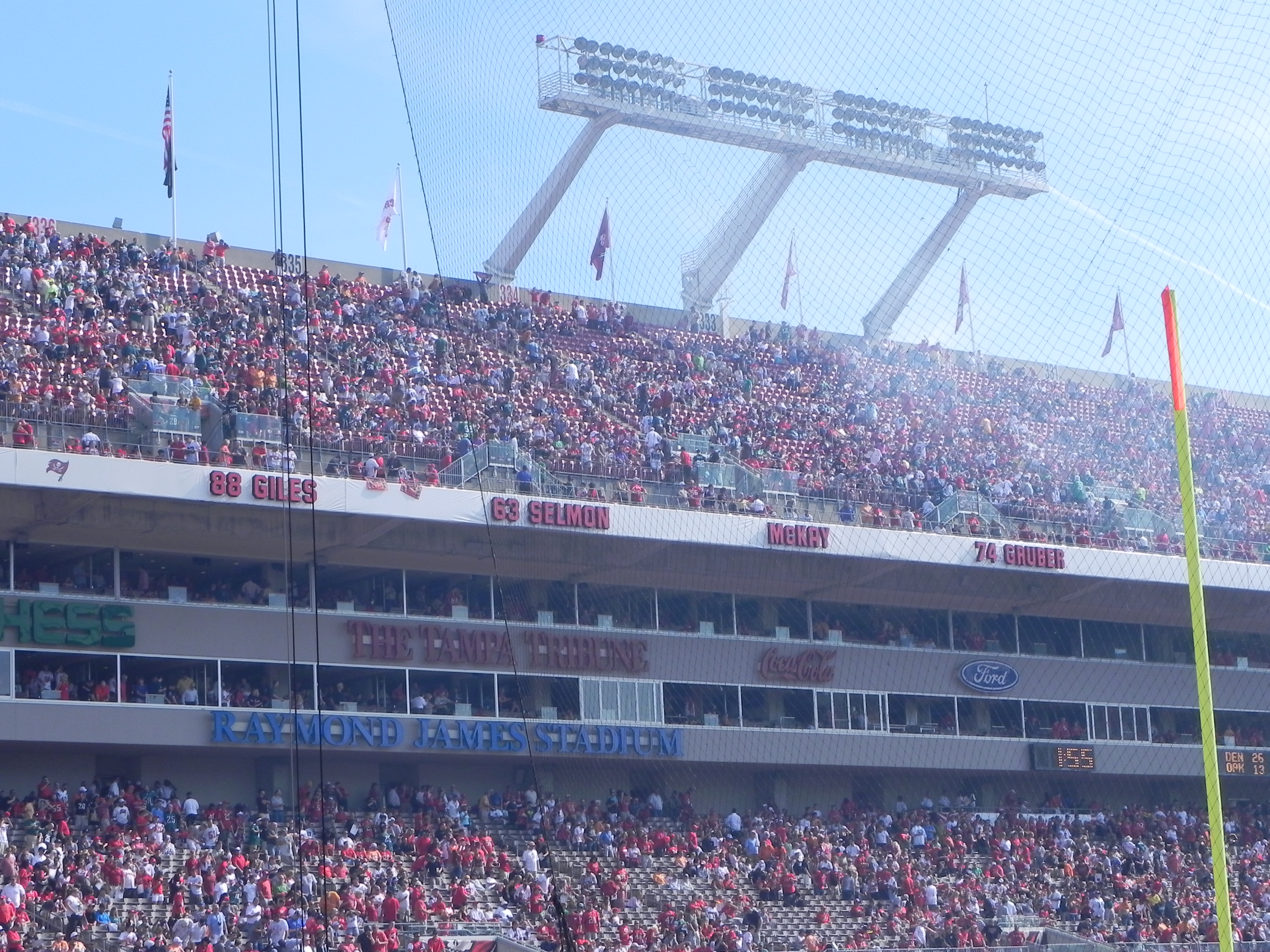
The Ring of Honor at Raymond James Stadium (c. 2012)

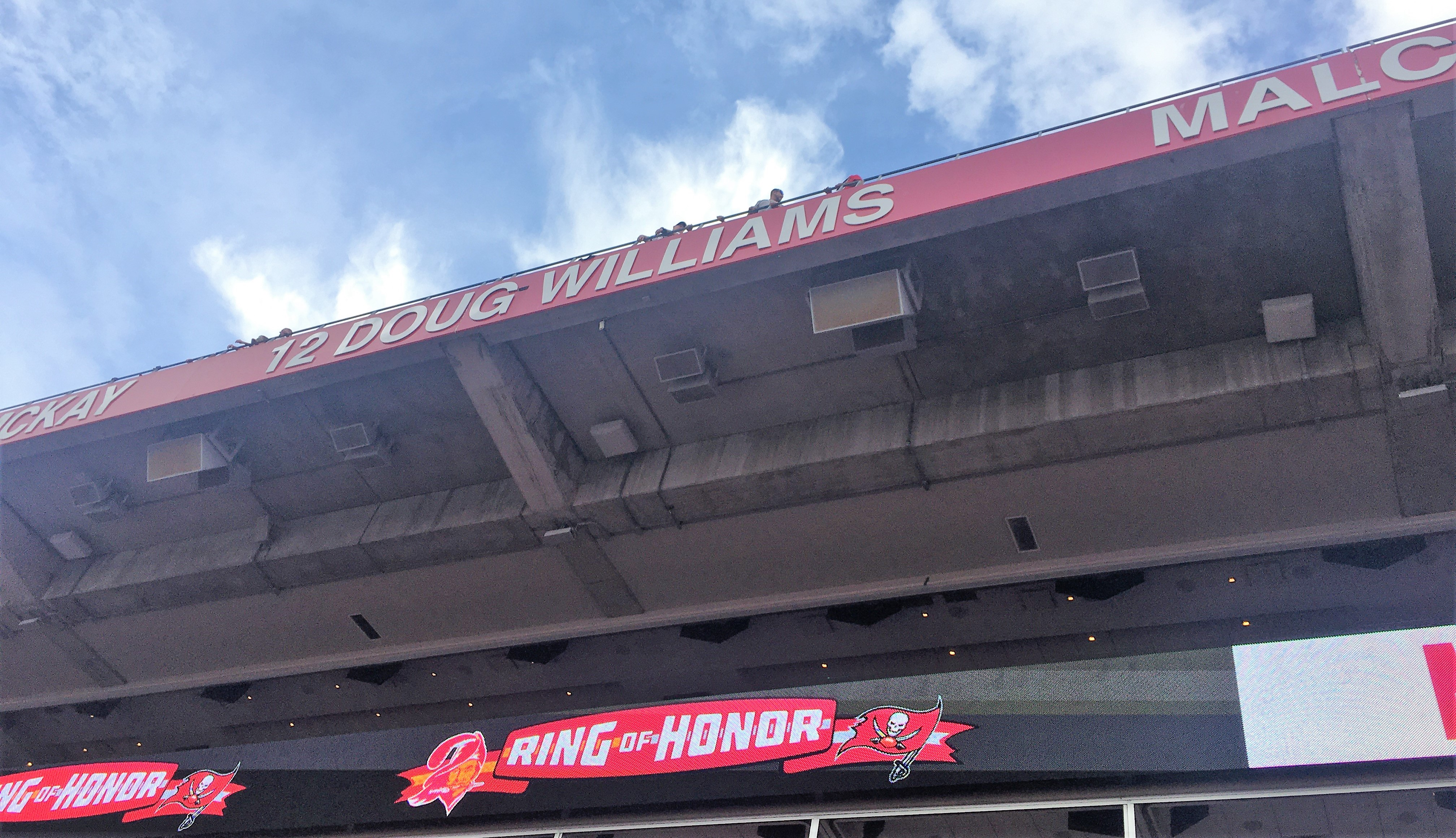
The updated Ring of Honor at Raymond James Stadium after facility renovations were completed in 2016–2017

Elected to the Pro Football Hall of Fame

Tampa Bay Buccaneers Ring of Honor
Year	No.	Name	Position	Tenure	Ceremony
2009	63	Lee Roy Selmon	DE	1976–1984	November 8, 2009
2010	—	John McKay	Head coach	1976–1984	December 5, 2010
2011	88	Jimmie Giles	TE	1978–1986	December 4, 2011
2012	74	Paul Gruber	OT	1988–1999	October 14, 2012
2013	99	Warren Sapp	DT	1995–2003	November 11, 2013
2014	55	Derrick Brooks	LB	1995–2008	September 14, 2014
2015	40	Mike Alstott	FB	1996–2007	October 4, 2015
2015	12	Doug Williams	QB	1978–1982	December 6, 2015
2016	47	John Lynch	S	1993–2003	November 13, 2016 (HOF celebration: November 22, 2021)
2017	—	Malcolm Glazer	Owner	1995–2014	October 15, 2017
2017	—	Jon Gruden	Head coach	2002–2008	December 18, 2017
2018	—	Tony Dungy	Head coach	1996–2001	September 24, 2018
2019	20	Ronde Barber	CB	1997–2012	September 22, 2019 (HOF celebration: September 25, 2023)
2020	—	Monte Kiffin	Defensive Coordinator	1996–2008	September 19, 2021
2022	—	Bruce Arians	Head coach; Executive	2019–present	January 1, 2023
2025	97	Simeon Rice	DE	2001–2006	November 30, 2025
Club-wide Recognitions
2021	—	Super Bowl XXXVII; Super Bowl LV	—	2002; 2020	September 9, 2021

=== All-Pro Team selections ===
Many current and former members of the Buccaneers have been selected to the Associated Press All-Pro first and second teams. While the AP All-Pro teams are generally considered the highest nomination, Pro Football Writers of America, Newspaper Enterprise Association, Pro Football Weekly, Pro Football Focus, and The Sporting News have also nominated Buccaneers players to their All-Pro teams.

Elected to the Pro Football Hall of Fame

Tampa Bay Buccaneers All-Pro Team selections
Player	Position	Tenure	No. of First Team	First Team	No. of Second Team	Second Team
Derrick Brooks	OLB	1995–2008	6	1999 (AP, PFWA, TSN), 2000 (AP, PFWA, TSN), 2002 (AP, PFWA, TSN), 2003 (TSN)†, 2004 (AP, PFWA), 2005 (AP)	4	1997 (AP), 1998 (AP), 2001 (AP), 2003 (AP)†
Warren Sapp	DT	1995–2003	4	1999 (AP, PFWA, TSN), 2000 (AP, PFWA, TSN), 2001 (AP, PFWA, TSN), 2002 (AP, PFWA, TSN)	2	1997 (AP), 1998 (AP)
Lee Roy Selmon	DE	1976–1984	3	1979 (AP, PFWA, NEA, PFW), 1980 (PFWA, NEA, TSN)†, 1982 (PFWA, NEA)†	4	1978 (AP, NEA), 1980 (AP)†, 1982 (AP)†, 1984 (NEA)
John Lynch	S	1993–2003	3	1999 (AP, PFWA, TSN), 2000 (AP, PFWA, TSN), 2001 (PFWA)†	2	2001 (AP)†, 2002 (AP)
Ronde Barber	CB	1997–2012	3	2001 (AP, PFWA), 2004 (AP), 2005 (AP)	2	2002 (AP), 2006 (AP)
Mike Alstott	FB	1996–2007	3	1997 (AP), 1998 (AP), 1999 (AP)	1	1996 (AP)
Gerald McCoy	DT	2010–2018	2	2013 (AP, PFWA, PFF, TSN), 2014 (TSN)†	3	2012 (PFF), 2014 (AP)†, 2016 (AP)
Hugh Green	OLB	1981–1985	2	1982 (PFWA, PFW)†, 1983 (TSN)†	2	1982 (AP, NEA)†, 1983 (AP, NEA)†
Hardy Nickerson	MLB	1993–1999	2	1993 (AP, PFWA, TSN); 1997 (AP)	2	1996 (AP), 1999 (AP)
Tristan Wirfs	OT	2020–present	2	2021 (AP, FW, SN, PFF), 2024 (AP, PFWA, NFLPA)	2	2020 (PFF), 2022 (AP, PFF)
Simeon Rice	DE	2001–2006	2	2002 (AP, PFWA, TSN), 2003 (TSN)†	1	2003 (AP)†
Antoine Winfield Jr.	S	2020–present	2	2021 (PFF), 2023 (AP, SN, PFF)		
Lavonte David	ILB	2012–present	1	2013 (AP, PFWA, PFF)	6	2016 (AP), 2017 (PFF), 2019 (PFF), 2020 (AP), 2021 (PFF), 2022 (PFF)
Mike Evans	WR	2014–2025	1	2016 (PFF)†	3	2016 (AP)†, 2019 (PFF), 2023 (AP)
Paul Gruber	G	1988–1999	1	1992 (NEA)†	2	1991 (NEA), 1992 (AP)†
Chris Godwin	WR	2017–present	1	2019 (PFF)†	1	2019 (AP)†
Ali Marpet	G	2015–2021	1	2020 (PFF)	1	2021 (PFF)
Tom Brady	QB	2020–2022	1	2021 (PFF)†	1	2021 (AP)†
Sean Farrell	G	1982–1986	1	1984 (TSN)		
David Logan	DT	1979–1986	1	1984 (TSN)		
Harry Hamilton	S	1988–1991	1	1989 (TSN)		
Darrelle Revis	CB	2013	1	2013 (PFF)		
Doug Martin	RB	2012–2017	1	2015 (AP, PFWA, PFF, TSN)		
Chase McLaughlin	K	2023–present	1	2023 (PFF)		
Dewey Selmon	OLB	1976–1981			1	1979 (AP)
Dave Lewis	OLB	1977–1981			1	1979 (NEA)
Neal Colzie	S	1980–1983			1	1982 (AP)
James Wilder	RB	1981–1989			1	1984 (AP, NEA)
Mark Carrier	WR	1987–1992			1	1989 (NEA)
Martin Gramatica	K	1999–2003			1	2000 (AP)
Josh Bidwell	P	2004–2009			1	2005 (AP)
Clifton Smith	KR	2008–2009			1	2008 (AP)
Vincent Jackson	WR	2012–2016			1	2012 (PFF)
Demar Dotson	OT	2009–2019			1	2017 (PFF)
Shaquil Barrett	OLB	2019–2023, 2024–present			1	2019 (AP)
Ryan Jensen	C	2018–2023			1	2019 (PFF)
Bradley Pinion	P	2019–2021			1	2020 (PFF)

Notes:

- † indicates a player earned a different first and second team nomination in the same year

=== Pro Bowl selections ===
Many former and current Tampa Bay Buccaneers players have represented the
franchise in the Pro Bowl:

Elected to the Pro Football Hall of Fame

Tampa Bay Buccaneers Pro Bowl selections
No. of Pro Bowls	Player	Position	Tenure	Pro Bowls
11	Derrick Brooks	OLB	1995–2008	1996–2005, 2008
7	Warren Sapp	DT	1995–2003	1996–2002
6	Lee Roy Selmon	DE	1976–1984	1978–1984
6	Mike Alstott	FB	1996–2007	1997–2002
6	Gerald McCoy	DT	2010–2018	2012–2017
6	Mike Evans	WR	2014–present	2016, 2018, 2019, 2021, 2023, 2024
5	Hardy Nickerson	MLB	1993–1999	1993, 1996–1999
5	John Lynch	SS	1993–2003	1997, 2000–2002
5	Ronde Barber	CB	1997–2012	2001, 2004–2006, 2008
4	Jimmie Giles	TE	1978–1986	1980–1982, 1985
4	Tristan Wirfs	OT	2020–present	2021–2024
3	Tony Mayberry	C	1990–1999	1996–1998
2	Hugh Green	LB	1981–1985	1982, 1983
2	Warrick Dunn	RB	1997–2001, 2008	1997, 2000
2	Simeon Rice	DE	2001–2006	2002, 2003
2	Davin Joseph	G	2006–2013	2008, 2011
2	Doug Martin	RB	2012–2017	2012, 2015
2	Shaquil Barrett	LB	2019–2023, 2024–present	2019, 2021
2	Vita Vea	NT	2018–present	2021, 2024
2	Baker Mayfield	QB	2023–present	2023, 2024
1	Dave Pear	NT	1976–1978	1978
1	Dave Lewis	LB	1977–1981	1980
1	James Wilder Sr.	RB	1981–1989	1984
1	Mark Carrier	WR	1987–1992	1989
1	Wayne Haddix	CB	1990–1991	1990
1	Trent Dilfer	QB	1994–1999	1997
1	Donnie Abraham	CB	1996–2001	2000
1	Martín Gramática	K	1999–2003	2000
1	Randall McDaniel	G	2000–2001	2000
1	Jeff Christy	C	2000–2002	2000
1	Keyshawn Johnson	WR	2000–2003	2001
1	Shelton Quarles	OLB	1997–2006	2002
1	Brad Johnson	QB	2001–2004	2002
1	Keenan McCardell	WR	2002–2003	2003
1	Josh Bidwell	P	2004–2009	2005
1	Dave Moore	LS	1992–2001, 2004–2007	2006
1	Jeff Garcia	QB	2007–2008	2007
1	Clifton Smith	RS	2008–2009	2008
1	Donald Penn	T	2006–2013	2010
1	Vincent Jackson	WR	2012–2016	2012
1	Darrelle Revis	CB	2013	2013
1	Lavonte David	ILB	2012–present	2015
1	Logan Mankins	G	2014–2015	2015
1	Jameis Winston	QB	2015–2019	2015
1	Kwon Alexander	OLB	2015–2018	2017
1	Chris Godwin	WR	2017–present	2019
1	Jason Pierre-Paul	OLB	2018–2021	2020
1	Tom Brady	QB	2020–2022	2021
1	Ryan Jensen	C	2018–2023	2021
1	Ali Marpet	G	2015–2021	2021
1	Devin White	ILB	2019–2023	2021
1	Antoine Winfield Jr.	FS	2020–present	2021
Head coaches
Coach		Tenure		Pro Bowls
John McKay		1976–1984		1981
Tony Dungy		1996–2001		1999

=== PFWA All-Rookie Team ===
Many members drafted by the Tampa Bay Buccaneers have been selected to the Pro Football Writers of America NFL All-Rookie Team:

PFWA All-Rookie Team
Season	Player	Position
1976	Lee Roy Selmon	DE (Second Team)
1976	Steve Young	T (Second Team)
1978	Doug Williams	QB
1979	Greg Roberts	G
1980	Ray Snell	G
1981	Hugh Green	OLB
1982	Sean Farrell	G
1984	Keith Browner	OLB
1984	Ron Heller	T
1986	J.D. Maarleveld	T
1987	Vinny Testaverde	QB
1988	Sidney Coleman	ILB
1988	Paul Gruber	G
1989	Chris Mohr	P
1990	Steve Christie	PK
1991	Lawrence Dawsey	WR
1992	Santana Dotson	DE
1993	Eric Curry	DE
1994	Errict Rhett	RB
1995	Derrick Brooks	LB
1995	Warren Sapp	DT
1996	Donnie Abraham	CB
1997	Reidel Anthony	WR
1997	Warrick Dunn	RB
1997	Frank Middleton	G
1998	Jacquez Green	PR
1999	Martin Gramatica	PK
1999	John McLaughlin	ST
2001	Kenyatta Walker	T
2004	Michael Clayton	WR
2005	Dan Buenning	G
2005	Cadillac Williams	RB
2007	Gaines Adams	DE
2007	Arron Sears	G
2008	Clifton Smith	PR
2010	LeGarrette Blount	RB
2010	Mike Williams	WR
2012	Mark Barron	S
2012	Lavonte David	LB
2012	Doug Martin	RB
2013	Mike Glennon	QB
2014	Mike Evans	WR
2015	Kwon Alexander	LB
2015	Ali Marpet	G
2015	Donovan Smith	T
2015	Jameis Winston	QB
2016	Vernon Hargreaves III	CB
2019	Sean Murphy-Bunting	CB
2019	Devin White	LB
2020	Antoine Winfield Jr.	S
2020	Tristan Wirfs	T
2024	Bucky Irving	RB

=== Top 50 ===
To mark their 50th season in 2025, the Buccaneers released a list of their franchise's all-time Top 50 players, as ranked through a combination of fan votes, consultation with media experts, and the conclusions of a team committee. The members were selected from a list of players who had started at least 50 games with the Buccaneers, were ranked in the team's top five in a major statistical category, had been voted to a Pro Bowl, named All-Pro, or were part of an iconic moment in Buccaneers history.

- 50. Rob Gronkowski
- 49. Martin Gramatica
- 48. Cameron Brate
- 47. Donald Penn
- 46. Dave Moore
- 45. Ricky Bell
- 44. Doug Martin
- 43. Jason Pierre-Paul
- 42. Cecil Johnson
- 41. Ryan Jensen
- 40. Mark Cotney
- 39. Brian Kelly
- 38. Baker Mayfield
- 37. Mike Washington
- 36. Hugh Green
- 35. David Logan
- 34. Mark Carrier
- 33. Vincent Jackson
- 32. Davin Joseph
- 31. Joey Galloway
- 30. Ali Marpet
- 29. Cedric Brown
- 28. Brad Johnson
- 27. Kevin House
- 26. Antoine Winfield Jr.
- 25. Donnie Abraham
- 24. Vita Vea
- 23. Shaquil Barrett
- 22. Shelton Quarles
- 21. Tony Mayberry
- 20. Richard Wood
- 19. James Wilder Sr.
- 18. Gerald McCoy
- 17. Jimmie Giles
- 16. Chris Godwin
- 15. Warrick Dunn
- 14. Simeon Rice
- 13. Doug Williams
- 12. Hardy Nickerson
- 11. Paul Gruber
- 10. Mike Alstott
- 9. Tristan Wirfs
- 8. Tom Brady
- 7. Lavonte David
- 6. John Lynch
- 5. Ronde Barber
- 4. Mike Evans
- 3. Warren Sapp
- 2. Lee Roy Selmon
- 1. Derrick Brooks

=== Documentaries ===
- A Football Life: Warren Sapp
- A Football Life: Ronde Barber (along with his twin brother Tiki Barber)
- A Football Life: Doug Williams
- A Football Life: Keenan McCardell (along with his former Jacksonville Jaguars' teammate Jimmy Smith)
- A Football Life: John Lynch
- The Timeline: 0–26 Bucs: The players of the 1976–1977 teams
- Hard Knocks: 2017 season
- America's Game: The Super Bowl Champions: 2002 season (XXXVII)
- America's Game: The Super Bowl Champions: 2020 season (LV)
- Raise the Flags : Ten-part docuseries on Amazon Prime chronicling 50 years of Buccaneers football

=== Tampa Bay draft picks ===
The Tampa Bay Buccaneers have had the first overall pick in the NFL draft on five occasions.

== Staff and head coaches ==
=== Current staff ===
Tampa Bay Buccaneers staff
Front office: Co-owner/co-chairman – Bryan Glazer; Co-owner/co-chairman – Edward Glazer; Co-owner/co-chairman – Joel Glazer; Co-owner/president – Darcie Glazer Kassewitz; Co-owner – Avram Glazer; Co-owner – Kevin Glazer; General manager – Jason Licht; Assistant general manager – Mike Greenberg; Assistant general manager – Rob McCartney; Vice president of player personnel – Mike Biehl; Vice president of football operations – Shelton Quarles; Senior personnel executive – Byron Kiefer; Vice president of player engagement – Duke Preston; Vice president of football research – Jacqueline Davidson; Senior advisor to the general manager – Bruce Arians; Director of player personnel – Shane Scannell; Assistant director of pro scouting – Sean Conley; Assistant director of pro scouting – Donovan Cotton; Director of college scouting – Tony Hardie; Director of football research – Zach Beistline; Manager of football administration and scouting operations - Peighton Roth; Senior national scout – Andy Speyer; Head coaches: Head coach – Todd Bowles; Offensive coaches: Offensive coordinator – Zac Robinson; Pass game coordinator – T.J. Yates; Quarterbacks – Chandler Whitmer; Running backs – Skip Peete; Wide receivers – Bryan McClendon; Tight ends – Justin Peelle; Assistant tight ends – Jeff Kastl; Run game coordinator/offensive line – Kevin Carberry; Assistant offensive line – Andrew Mitchell; Senior offensive assistant/pass game specialist – Ken Zampese	Defensive coaches: Pass game coordinator – George Edwards; Defensive line – Marcus West; Run game coordinator/outside linebackers – Larry Foote; Inside linebackers – Mike Caldwell; Cornerbacks – Rashad Johnson; Safeties – Tim Atkins; Defensive assistant – Todd Bowles Jr.; Defensive quality control – Joey Fitzgerald; Special teams coaches: Special teams coordinator – Danny Smith; Special teams assistant – Luke Smith; Coaching operations: Senior manager of coaching operations – Sarah Evans; Strength and conditioning: Head strength and conditioning – Chad Wade; Assistant strength and conditioning – Cory Bichey; Assistant strength and conditioning – DeAndre Ward Sr; → Coaching staff → Front office → More NFL staffs

=== Head coaches ===
Coach	Seasons	W–L–T (%)	Division titles	Wild Card berths	NFC Championship appearances	NFC Championships	Super Bowl Championships
John McKay	1976–1984	45–91–1 (.332)	1979, 1981	1982	1979 (vs. Rams)		
Leeman Bennett	1985–1986	4–28–0 (.125)					
Ray Perkins	1987–1990	19–41–0 (.317)					
Richard Williamson	1990–1991	4–15–0 (.211)					
Sam Wyche	1992–1995	23–41–0 (.359)					
Tony Dungy	1996–2001	56–46–0 (.549)	1999	1997, 2000, 2001	1999 (at Rams)		
Jon Gruden	2002–2008	60–57–0 (.513)	2002, 2005, 2007		2002 (at Eagles)	2002	XXXVII (vs. Raiders)
Raheem Morris	2009–2011	17–31–0 (.354)					
Greg Schiano	2012–2013	11–21–0 (.344)					
Lovie Smith	2014–2015	8–24–0 (.250)					
Dirk Koetter	2016–2018	19–29–0 (.396)					
Bruce Arians	2019–2021	36–18–0 (.667)	2021	2020	2020 (at Packers)	2020	LV (vs. Chiefs)
Todd Bowles	2022–present	27–24–0 (.529)	2022, 2023, 2024				

== Culture ==
=== Tampa Bay Buccaneers Cheerleaders ===
The Bucs created an official cheerleading squad in their first season, called the "Swash-Buc-Lers". In 1999, they were renamed as the "Tampa Bay Buccaneers Cheerleaders".

=== A Triumph of the Heart: The Ricky Bell Story ===
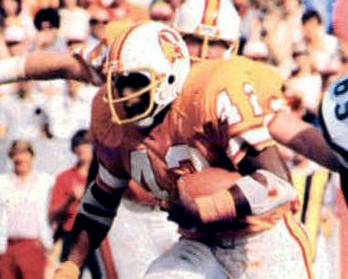
Bell's rushing abilities helped lead Tampa Bay to their first franchise playoff win in 1979.

A Triumph of the Heart: The Ricky Bell Story is a made-for-television movie that recounts the life of the late Buccaneer running back Ricky Bell. The movie takes place through a dramatic reenactment of the 1981 season, including actual footage of gameplay around the dramatized role by Mario Van Peebles playing Bell himself. Bell finds himself befriending an impaired child who inspire each other to become better in their own ways. It also includes other former Buccaneer players, like Lee Roy Selmon, Charley Hannah, and Doug Williams (only through gameplay footage).

=== Raise the Flags ===
In 2025, Amazon Prime released a 10-episode miniseries called Raise the Flags, which detailed the previous 49 years of history of the Tampa Bay Buccaneers franchise from how they were founded by Hugh Culverhouse to how they won two Super Bowls. The documentary was very well received by both audiences and critics.

== Rivalries ==
=== Divisional ===
==== Atlanta Falcons ====
The Buccaneers and Falcons met for the first time in the 1977 season, one year after the Buccaneers joined the NFL as the newest expansion team. The rivalry became fiercer after the 2002 season, when the Buccaneers and Falcons were placed in the same division, leading to constant clashes for the divisional title. The Falcons lead the overall series, 32–31. The two teams have not met in the playoffs.

==== Carolina Panthers ====
The Buccaneers and Panthers first meet in 1995, back when the later team joined the NFL as expansion franchise. However, the rivalry would take off during the 2000s with the creation of the NFC South and was described as "heated" and "physical" due to two main reasons; the first being that both teams fought for dominating control over the NFC South throughout most of the 2000s. The second reason being that players on both franchises suffered season ending injuries during their annual games. Examples include Chris Simms, Dante Wesley, Clifton Smith, and Kavika Pittman. As of the 2024 season, the Panthers led the rivalry 25–24.

==== New Orleans Saints ====
The Saints and Buccaneers have one noticeable parallel throughout the two franchises history, they were both regarded as unsuccessful franchises until the 21st century, which was both teams were placed in the NFC South in 2002, as well as when their rivalry would truly begin to take off, when both teams improved their fortunes, though the Buccaneers got over the hump first with by winning Super Bowl XXXVII and the Saints winning their first Super Bowl 7 years later in Super Bowl XLIV. The first meeting between these two franchises first occurred in 1977 when the Buccaneers beat the Saints and ended their 26-game straight losing streak. While it is not the most well known rivalry in the NFL, it's grown into one of the league's fiercest and most physical. The rivalry reached new heights in the 2000s, which was when the Buccaneers had a higher advantage over the Saints in the regular season, when both teams started posting winning seasons in that decade. New Orleans Saints leads the rivalry 39–24 and the two franchises met once in the playoffs in which the Buccaneers defeated the Saints 30 to 20 and eventually won Super Bowl LV.

=== Conference ===
From 1977 to 2001; the Buccaneers played in the former NFC Central division, culminating in two former divisional rivalries developing with the Detroit Lions and the Green Bay Packers.

==== Green Bay Packers ====
The Buccaneers and Packers were division rivals from 1977 to 2002 when both were in the NFC Central division. The teams have played several notable games, including a Snow Bowl game in 1985, a playoff game in 1998 and the 2020 NFC Championship Game. As of the 2023 season, the Packers lead the series 34–24–1.

==== Philadelphia Eagles ====
The Buccaneers have grown a fairly recent playoff rivalry with the Philadelphia Eagles beginning in the late 1970s, but reached new heights in competition during the new millennium as the two teams have met in the postseason four times since 2000. The rivalry would return in the early 2020s when the Buccaneers beat the Eagles in the 2021 and 2023 NFC Wild Card games. As of Week 4 of the 2025 season, the Buccaneers lead the all-time series 13–12. The regular season has the Eagles lead 10–9, while the Buccaneers lead 4–2 in the postseason.

==== Los Angeles Rams ====
The Buccaneers have grown a recent rivalry with the Los Angeles Rams as the two teams have faced off multiple times in the postseason. They have met in the Divisional Round once (2021), and in the NFC Championship Game twice (1979, 1999). The Rams have won all three postseason matchups. The rivalry also includes a memorable Monday Night Football game in 2000. The two teams became the first in league history to win a Super Bowl in their home stadiums as Tampa won LV in 2021, and Los Angeles won LVI a year later. Both teams combine for four Super Bowl championships as they regularly fought for control of the conference in the early 2000s and 2020s respectively. As of the 2025 season, the Rams lead the all-time series 20–10.

=== Interconference ===
==== Miami Dolphins ====
The Buccaneers developed a minor instate rivalry with fellow Floridian team; the Miami Dolphins. The two teams had their first meeting in Week 7 of the 1976 season, with the Dolphins winning 23–20. The 1976 meeting was the only one where both teams were members of the AFC, with Tampa leaving later to join the NFC. As a result, the two teams can only meet as interconference rivals, which is not guaranteed to be annual. As of the 2023 season, the Buccaneers leads the all-time regular-season series 7–5.

== Radio and television ==
Map of radio affiliates

The Buccaneers' current flagship radio stations are WXTB 97.9 FM and WDAE 620 AM. The play-by-play announcer, as of 2026, is Tony Castricone, who replaced longtime announcer Gene Deckerhoff after his 2025 retirement. Former Bucs tight end Dave Moore joined Deckerhoff as analyst for the 2007 season. T. J. Rives works as the sideline reporter.

Broadcast legend and former Green Bay Packers' announcer Ray Scott was the play-by-play man for the Bucs' first two seasons in 1976 and 1977. Dick Crippen called the team's games in the first half of the 1978 season, with Jim Gallogly taking over for the second half. From 1979 to 1988 Mark Champion, who became the radio voice of the Detroit Lions (1989–2004) and then the Detroit Pistons (2001–present), held that position with the Bucs; Deckerhoff took over for Champion following the 1988 season and continued until his retirement.

Former Buccaneer Hardy Nickerson served as color commentator for one season in 2006, until he signed with the Bears as a linebackers coach on February 23, 2007. Nickerson had replaced Scot Brantley, who was the commentator from 1999 through 2005. Jesse Ventura, the famous professional wrestler, actor, and former governor of Minnesota, was Deckerhoff's partner on the Bucs radio broadcasts for one year, 1990, and former Buc David Logan held that position after Ventura until his death after the 1998 season. Dave Kocerek and Fran Curci were also color commentators for the Buccaneers during their earlier years.

Ronnie Lane previously worked as a sideline reporter.

The Bucs have broadcast on FM radio since signing with Top 40 station WRBQ-FM in 1992. The team moved to WQYK-FM in 1994, then to WFUS in 2004, and then to WXTB in 2017.

While regular season and playoff games in the NFL are all broadcast by national television contracts on CBS, Fox, NBC, ESPN and NFL Network, the television broadcasts are for the most part handled by the individual teams. WESH simulcasts the broadcast in the Orlando area.

CBS, Fox and NBC games are shown respectively in Tampa Bay on WTSP, WTVT and WFLA-TV, while they are shown respectively in Orlando on WKMG, WOFL and WESH. The great majority of games are aired on Fox owned-and-operated stations WTVT and WOFL, by virtue of Fox owning the rights to NFC games. WTSP and WKMG air any Buccaneers home games against American Football Conference teams. Monday Night Football games on ESPN and Thursday night games on NFL Network are simulcast locally on WMOR-TV, who also previously carried the Bucs' Sunday Night Football games when they were televised on ESPN and TNT; previously, the Bucs' appearances on the cable networks were seen locally on WFLA-TV and WFTS.

At WFLA, Chris Myers was the play-by-play announcer with John Lynch as color commentator. Both Myers and Lynch worked nationally with Fox Sports at the time until Lynch became the general manager of the San Francisco 49ers in 2017. Ron Jaworski previously served as color commentator, until he signed with Monday Night Football for 2007. Charles Davis also served as color commentator from 2007 to 2008.

WTOG channel 44 also previously broadcast Buccaneers preseason games for many years, ending in 2002. Former CBS play-by-play and ESPN golf broadcaster Jim Kelly was the play-by-play announcer for many of those games in the 1980s, and Joe Namath was a commentator.

In the early years of the franchise, WTVT, then a CBS affiliate, broadcast some Buccaneers preseason games. Sports anchor Andy Hardy handled the play-by-play, and for one game in 1978, his broadcast partner was his friend, Florida State alumni, and movie actor Burt Reynolds.

== See also ==
- List of Super Bowl champions
- Tampa Bay Lightning – National Hockey League team in Tampa, Florida
- Tampa Bay Rays – Major League Baseball franchise
- Tampa Bay Rowdies – American professional soccer club based in St. Petersburg

Preceded by New England Patriots	Super Bowl champions 2002 (XXXVII)	Succeeded by New England Patriots
Preceded by Kansas City Chiefs	Super Bowl champions 2020 (LV)	Succeeded by Los Angeles Rams
