= List of current NFC team rosters =

The following is a list of current National Football Conference (NFC) team rosters.

== Key ==
Reserve list key
Code	Roster designation
IR	Injured reserve
IR-DFR	Injured reserve/designated for return
W/I	Waived/injured
PUP	Physically unable to perform
NF-Inj.	Non-football injury
NF-Ill.	Non-football illness
Active/PUP	Active/physically unable to perform
Active/NF-Inj.	Active/non-football injury
Active/NF-Ill.	Active/non-football illness
PS/I	Practice squad/injured
PS/NFI	Practice squad/non-football injury
PS/EX	Practice squad exempt
Susp.	Suspended
Franchise	Franchise tag
Transition	Transition tag
Futures	Futures contract
DNR	Did not report
Left Squad	Reserve/left squad
Military	Reserve/military
Exempt	Commissioner's Exempt List

== NFC East ==
=== Dallas Cowboys ===
Dallas Cowboys roster
Quarterbacks (QB): 16 Sam Howell; 4 Dak Prescott; Running backs (RB): 31 Emari Demercado; 32 Tyler Goodson; 30 Hunter Luepke FB; 33 Javonte Williams; Wide receivers (WR): 80 Camden Brown; 19 Ryan Flournoy; 88 CeeDee Lamb; 18 Jonathan Mingo; 3 George Pickens; 9 KaVontae Turpin RS; Tight ends (TE): 87 Jake Ferguson; 86 Luke Schoonmaker; 89 Brevyn Spann-Ford	Offensive linemen (OL): 66 T. J. Bass G; 56 Cooper Beebe C; 52 Tyler Booker G; 65 Ajani Cornelius T; 60 Tyler Guyton T; 77 Broderick Jones T; 67 Drew Shelton T; 73 Tyler Smith G; 78 Terence Steele T; Defensive linemen (DL): 97 Kenny Clark DT; 93 Elijah Garcia DT; 91 Otito Ogbonnia DT; 99 LT Overton DT; 92 Quinnen Williams DT	Linebackers (LB): 55 Jaishawn Barham MLB; 45 Justin Barron MLB; 6 Donovan Ezeiruaku OLB; 7 Rashan Gary OLB; 41 James Houston OLB; 50 Shemar James MLB; 57 Malachi Lawrence OLB; 40 Von Miller OLB; 0 DeMarvion Overshown MLB; 59 Tyrus Wheat OLB; 53 Dee Winters MLB; Defensive backs (DB): 14 Markquese Bell S; 26 DaRon Bland CB; 11 Alijah Clark S; 13 Caleb Downs S; 2 Cobie Durant CB; 24 Malik Hooker S; 25 Joey Porter Jr. CB; 28 Shavon Revel CB; 23 Ameer Speed CB; 43 Juanyeh Thomas S; Special teams (ST): 5 Bryan Anger P; 17 Brandon Aubrey K; 44 Trent Sieg LS	Practice squad: 37 Israel Abanikanda RB; 95 Tommy Dunn DT; 39 Tyrek Funderburk CB; 81 Jordan Hudson WR; 79 Marcellus Johnson T; 15 Derion Kendrick CB; 58 Isaiah Land OLB; 51 Nick Leverett G; 84 James Mitchell TE; 64 Wanya Morris T; 96 Adedayo Odeleye DT (IPP); 42 Curtis Robinson LB; 83 Anthony Smith WR; 27 Reddy Steward CB; 10 Kyle Trask QB; 46 Michael Trigg TE; Reserve: 90 Jonathan Bullard DT (IR/DFR); 20 Malik Davis RB (IR); 85 Princeton Fant TE (IR); 94 Kelvin Gilliam DT (IR); 72 Matt Hennessy C (IR); 35 Marist Liufau OLB (IR/DFR); 1 P. J. Locke S (IR/DFR); 29 Devin Moore CB (IR/DFR); 49 DJ Rogers TE (IR); 34 Jalen Thompson S (IR/DFR) 53 active, 15 practice squad (1 IPP), 10 reserve As of October 20, 2026. Rookies in italics.; Roster; Depth chart; Transactions

=== New York Giants ===
New York Giants roster
Quarterbacks (QB): 13 Jake Haener; 18 J. J. McCarthy; 19 Jameis Winston; Running backs (RB): 45 Patrick Ricard FB; 26 Devin Singletary; 44 Cam Skattebo; 29 Tyrone Tracy Jr.; Wide receivers (WR): 88 Malachi Fields; 89 Charlie Jones; 17 Darnell Mooney; 1 Malik Nabers; Tight ends (TE): 86 Thomas Fidone; 84 Theo Johnson; 9 Isaiah Likely; 85 Chris Manhertz	Offensive linemen (OL): 74 J. C. Davis T; 72 Jermaine Eluemunor T; 60 Bryan Hudson C; 65 Francis Mauigoa G; 71 Marcus Mbow T; 76 Jon Runyan Jr. G; 61 John Michael Schmitz C; 67 Josh Sills T; 64 Aaron Stinnie G; 78 Andrew Thomas T; Defensive linemen (DL): 91 Darius Alexander; 93 Shelby Harris; 97 Bobby Jamison-Travis; 99 C. J. Okoye; 98 D. J. Reader	Linebackers (LB): 46 Zaire Barnes; 3 Abdul Carter OLB; 49 Tremaine Edmunds; 48 Trace Ford OLB; 54 Malik Harrison; 51 Jack Kelly; 41 Micah McFadden; 52 Arvell Reese; 5 Kayvon Thibodeaux OLB; Defensive backs (DB): 2 Deonte Banks CB; 28 Elijah Campbell S; 8 Jevon Holland S; 12 Colton Hood CB; 31 Nic Jones CB; 20 Greg Newsome II CB; 27 Tyler Nubin S; 22 Dru Phillips CB; 25 Jason Pinnock S; 35 Nikko Reed CB; 24 Ar'Darius Washington S; Special teams (ST): 58 Ben Mann LS; 15 Jordan Stout P; 34 Dominic Zvada K	Practice squad: 30 Jason Brownlee WR; 83 Dalen Cambre WR; 47 Grant Finley FB; 37 Dontae Fleming WR; 68 Josh Gesky OL; 79 Jarrod Gray OL (IPP); 73 Kendrick Green OL; 81 Jalin Hyatt WR; 43 Raheem Layne S; 36 Phil Mafah RB; 55 Chandler Martin LB; 90 P. J. Mustipher DT; 33 Jaden Robinson CB; 70 Ryan Schernecke T; 96 Dawuane Smoot OLB; 94 Josh Tupou DT; 69 Geno VanDeMark G; Reserve: 21 Paulson Adebo CB (IR/DFR); 82 Calvin Austin WR (IR); 35 Jarrick Bernard-Converse CB (IR); 87 Braxton Berrios WR (IR); 38 Korie Black CB (IR/DFR); 0 Brian Burns OLB (IR); 6 Jaxson Dart QB (IR); 39 Thaddeus Dixon CB (IR); 57 Chauncey Golston DE (IR); 80 Gunner Olszewski WR (IR); 36 Rico Payton CB (IR); 95 Roy Robertson-Harris DT (IR) 53 active, 16 practice squad (1 IPP), 12 reserve As of October 21, 2026. Rookies in italics.; Roster; Depth chart; Transactions

=== Philadelphia Eagles ===
Philadelphia Eagles roster
Quarterbacks (QB): 16 Tanner McKee; 14 Joe Milton; 18 Cole Payton; Running backs (RB): 26 Saquon Barkley; 39 Dameon Pierce; Wide receivers (WR): 0 Marquise Brown; 80 Darius Cooper; 85 Britain Covey PR; 9 Makai Lemon; 19 Elijah Moore; 6 DeVonta Smith; 13 Dontayvion Wicks; Tight ends (TE): 88 Dallas Goedert; 84 E. J. Jenkins; 83 Johnny Mundt	Offensive linemen (OL): 72 Markel Bell T; 74 Fred Johnson T; 65 Lane Johnson T; 66 Drew Kendall C; 61 Willie Lampkin G; 68 Jordan Mailata T; 75 Jake Majors C; 76 Micah Morris G; 56 Tyler Steen G; Defensive linemen (DL): 98 Jalen Carter DT; 90 Jordan Davis DT; 97 Moro Ojomo DT; 95 Ty Robinson DT; 94 Byron Young DT	Linebackers (LB): 53 Zack Baun; 11 Jihaad Campbell; 17 Arnold Ebiketie OLB; 57 A. J. Epenesa OLB; 52 Jonathan Greenard OLB; 58 Jalyx Hunt OLB; 42 Smael Mondon Jr.; 3 Nolan Smith OLB; 54 Jeremiah Trotter Jr.; Defensive backs (DB): 35 Michael Carter II S; 33 Cooper DeJean CB; 29 Marcus Epps S; 31 Jonathan Jones CB; 22 Mac McWilliams CB; 27 Quinyon Mitchell CB; 23 Kenny Moore II CB; 24 Andrew Mukuba S; 7 Kelee Ringo CB; 2 Riq Woolen CB; Special teams (ST): 4 Jake Elliott K; 10 Braden Mann P; 41 Rocco Underwood LS	Practice squad: 73 Kiran Amegadjie T; 93 Uar Bernard DT (IPP) (PS/I); 48 Dean Clark S; 86 Zach Ertz TE; 82 Erik Ezukanma WR; 47 Xavier Gipson WR; 96 Gabe Hall DT; 50 Keyshawn James-Newby OLB; -- Elijah Mitchell RB; 67 John Ojukwu T; 43 Mason Reiger OLB; 77 Xavier Truss T; 46 Josh Weru OLB; 78 Zion Wilson DT; 38 Cole Wisniewski S; Reserve: 21 Jakorian Bennett CB (IR/DFR); 8 Tank Bigsby RB (IR); 81 Grant Calcaterra TE (IR/DFR); 69 Landon Dickerson G (IR); 1 Jalen Hurts QB (IR); 37 Tucker Large S (NF-Inj.); 32 Andre' Sam S (IR); 28 Will Shipley RB (IR); 87 Eli Stowers TE (IR); 89 Johnny Wilson WR (IR) 51 active, 14 practice squad (1 IPP), 10 reserve As of October 21, 2026. Rookies in italics.; Roster; Depth chart; Transactions

=== Washington Commanders ===
Washington Commanders roster
Quarterbacks (QB): 5 Jayden Daniels; 16 Athan Kaliakmanis; 8 Marcus Mariota; Running backs (RB): 30 Austin Ekeler; 26 Jeremy McNichols; 1 Rachaad White; Wide receivers (WR): 6 Dyami Brown; 13 Treylon Burks; 3 Stefon Diggs; 11 Luke McCaffrey KR; 17 Terry McLaurin; 14 Antonio Williams; Tight ends (TE): 87 John Bates; 85 Chig Okonkwo; 82 Ben Sinnott; 80 Colson Yankoff	Offensive linemen (OL): 67 Nick Allegretti C/G; 74 Brandon Coleman T/G; 72 Josh Conerly Jr. T; 76 Sam Cosmi G; 66 Matt Gulbin C; 63 Lucas Patrick C/G; 75 Chris Paul G; 62 Tanoa Togiai G; 71 Andrew Wylie T/G; Defensive linemen (DL): 99 Javon Kinlaw DT; 90 Charles Omenihu DE; 94 Daron Payne DT; 97 Tim Settle DT; 96 Shy Tuttle DT; 91 Deatrich Wise Jr. DE	Linebackers (LB): 92 Dorance Armstrong OLB; 45 K'Lavon Chaisson OLB; 48 Joshua Josephs OLB; 4 Frankie Luvu MLB; 58 Jordan Magee LB; 56 Kain Medrano MLB; 98 Odafe Oweh OLB; 52 Sonny Styles MLB; Defensive backs (DB): 23 Trey Amos CB; 35 Percy Butler S; 25 Nick Cross S; 29 Rasul Douglas CB; 20 Quan Martin S; 24 Fabian Moreau CB; 18 Tyler Owens S; 39 Jeremy Reaves S; 2 Amik Robertson CB; 0 Mike Sainristil CB; 37 Isaac Yiadom CB; Special teams (ST): 69 Tyler Ott LS; 19 Drew Stevens K; 10 Tress Way P	Practice squad: 50 Ricky Barber DT; 86 Jaden Bradley WR; 55 Byron Cowart DT; 38 Fred Davis II CB; 88 Nick DeGennaro WR; 61 Julian Good-Jones C/G; 36 Darren Hall S; 15 Sam Hartman QB; 12 Van Jefferson WR; 51 Ale Kaho LB; 59 T. J. Maguranyanga DE (IPP); 31 Devin Neal RB; 77 Esa Pole T; 32 Craig Reynolds RB; 73 Trent Scott T/G; 93 Charles Snowden OLB; 89 Jack Westover TE; Reserve: 54 Leo Chenal LB (IR); 22 Jacory Croskey-Merritt RB (IR); 41 Javontae Jean-Baptiste OLB (IR); 83 Jaylin Lane WR (IR); 95 Jer'Zhan Newton DT (IR); 78 Laremy Tunsil T (IR) 53 active, 16 practice squad (1 IPP), 6 reserve As of October 19, 2026. Rookies in italics.; Roster; Depth chart; Transactions

== NFC North ==
=== Chicago Bears ===
Chicago Bears roster
Quarterbacks (QB): 17 Tyson Bagent; 11 Case Keenum; 18 Caleb Williams; Running backs (RB): 23 Roschon Johnson; 25 Kyle Monangai; 4 D'Andre Swift; Wide receivers (WR): 10 Luther Burden III; 15 Rome Odunze; 14 Kalif Raymond; 13 Zavion Thomas; 9 Jahdae Walker; Tight ends (TE): 85 Cole Kmet; 84 Colston Loveland; 87 Sam Roush	Offensive linemen (OL): 79 Theo Benedet T; 67 Garrett Bradbury C; 73 Jonah Jackson G; 54 Logan Jones C; 74 Jordan McFadden G; 65 Luke Newman G; 62 Joe Thuney G; 75 Ozzy Trapilo T; 58 Darnell Wright T; Defensive linemen (DL): 94 Austin Booker DE; 90 Neville Gallimore DT; 92 Daniel Hardy DE; 50 Grady Jarrett DT; 59 Jamree Kromah DE; 91 Jayden Loving DT; 97 James Lynch DT; 93 Kentavius Street DT; 95 Shemar Turner DT; 96 Jordan van den Berg DT	Linebackers (LB): 12 Devin Bush Jr.; 53 T. J. Edwards; 49 Keyshaun Elliott; 48 D'Marco Jackson; 57 Jack Sanborn; 44 Noah Sewell; Defensive backs (DB): 39 Josh Blackwell CB; 6 Kyler Gordon CB; 22 Elijah Hicks S; 1 Jaylon Johnson CB; 21 Cam Lewis S; 26 Nick McCloud CB; 24 Malik Muhammad CB; 20 Clark Phillips III CB; 29 Tyrique Stevenson CB; 31 Dillon Thieneman S; 38 Skyler Thomas S; Special teams (ST): 46 Scott Daly LS; 8 Cairo Santos K; 19 Tory Taylor P	Practice squad: 36 Salvon Ahmed RB; 76 Caden Barnett G; 88 Stephen Carlson TE; 81 Kaden Davis WR; 32 KC Eziomume CB; 45 Beau Gardner LS; 80 Qadir Ismail TE; 27 Anthony Johnson Jr. S (PS/I); 47 Buddy Johnson LB; 72 Christian Jones T; 37 Elijah Jones CB; 35 Wayne Matthews LB; 82 Scotty Miller WR; 16 Miller Moss QB; 83 JP Richardson WR; 30 Zavier Scott RB; 33 Keidron Smith S; Reserve: 38 Brittain Brown RB (IR); 2 Coby Bryant S (IR); 43 Tony Fields II LB (IR); 70 Braxton Jones T (IR); 86 Nikola Kalinic TE (IR); 43 Hayden Large TE (IR); 55 Dayo Odeyingbo DE (IR); 46 Nephi Sewell LB (IR); 98 Montez Sweat DE (Susp.) 53 active, 16 practice squad (1 IPP), 9 reserve As of October 19, 2026. Rookies in italics.; Roster; Depth chart; Transactions

=== Detroit Lions ===
Detroit Lions roster
Quarterbacks (QB): 11 Joshua Dobbs; 16 Jared Goff; Running backs (RB): 0 Jahmyr Gibbs; 25 Jacob Saylors KR; 33 Sione Vaki; Wide receivers (WR): 17 Tay Martin; 14 Amon-Ra St. Brown; 18 Isaac TeSlaa; 1 Jameson Williams; Tight ends (TE): 83 Tyler Conklin; 87 Sam LaPorta; 13 Jackson Meeks; 89 Brock Wright FB	Offensive linemen (OL): 79 Larry Borom T; 71 Miles Frazier G; 73 Christian Mahogany G; 65 Seth McLaughlin C; 76 Blake Miller T; 69 Tate Ratledge G; 70 Juice Scruggs C; 58 Penei Sewell T; Defensive linemen (DL): 50 Skyler Gill-Howard DT; 99 Ahmed Hassanein ED; 97 Aidan Hutchinson ED; 93 Tyler Lacy ED; 54 Alim McNeill DT; 8 Derrick Moore ED; 66 Eric O'Neill ED; 95 Levi Onwuzurike DT; 91 Tyleik Williams DT; 94 Mekhi Wingo DT; 98 D. J. Wonnum ED	Linebackers (LB): 55 Derrick Barnes; 46 Jack Campbell; 53 Trevor Nowaske; 57 Amen Ogbongbemiga; 44 Malcolm Rodriguez; 41 Jimmy Rolder; Defensive backs (DB): 6 Keith Abney II CB; 36 Chuck Clark S; 34 Bishop Fitzgerald S; 30 Khalil Dorsey CB; 5 Christian Izien S; 21 Roger McCreary CB; 2 Ennis Rakestraw Jr. CB; 4 D. J. Reed CB; 23 Rock Ya-Sin CB; Special teams (ST): 39 Jake Bates K; 3 Jack Fox P; 49 Hogan Hatten LS	Practice squad: 15 Luke Altmyer QB; 35 Joe Bachie LB; 24 Aamaris Brown CB; 86 DeAndre Carter WR; 77 Devin Cochran T; 82 Thomas Gordon TE; 9 Lucky Jackson WR; 72 Aidan Keanaaina DT; 80 Lawrence Keys WR; 84 Miles Kitselman TE; 67 Elijah Klein G; 19 Dominic Lovett WR; 61 Anthony Lucas ED; 60 Jeffrey M'Ba DT (IPP); 63 Mason Miller G (PS/I); 26 Jabari Small RB; 96 Ben Stille DT; 38 Nick Whiteside CB; Reserve: 78 Ben Bartch G (IR); 32 Brian Branch SS (PUP); 11 Damone Clark MLB (IR); 12 Thomas Harper S (IR); 31 Kerby Joseph FS (PUP); 85 Tom Kennedy WR (IR); 88 Kendrick Law WR (IR); 29 Avonte Maddox S (IR); 59 Giovanni Manu T (NF-Inj.); 64 Cade Mays C (IR); 10 Isiah Pacheco RB (IR); 92 Payton Turner ED (IR); 45 Devin White LB (IR) 50 active, 16 practice squad (2 IPP), 13 reserve As of October 20, 2026. Rookies in italics.; Roster; Depth chart; Transactions

=== Green Bay Packers ===
Green Bay Packers roster
Quarterbacks (QB): 10 Jordan Love; 6 Tyrod Taylor; Running backs (RB): 8 Josh Jacobs; 26 Kaleb Johnson; 32 MarShawn Lloyd; 22 Pierre Strong Jr.; Wide receivers (WR): 0 Matthew Golden; 16 Bo Melton; 87 J. Michael Sturdivant; 9 Christian Watson; 83 Savion Williams; Tight ends (TE): 85 Tucker Kraft; 86 Mark Redman; 18 Jonnu Smith; 81 Josh Whyle	Offensive linemen (OL): 65 Aaron Banks G; 71 Anthony Belton T; 52 Jager Burton C; 79 Travis Glover T; 67 Donovan Jennings G; 62 Jacob Monk G; 77 Jordan Morgan T; 75 Sean Rhyan C; 72 Laken Tomlinson G; 73 John Williams T; 70 Kevin Zeitler G; Defensive linemen (DL): 94 Karl Brooks DT; 93 Anthony Campbell DT; 57 Brenton Cox Jr. ED; 51 Dani Dennis-Sutton ED; 55 Chris McClellan DT; 99 Barryn Sorrell ED; 90 Lukas Van Ness ED; 95 Devonte Wyatt DT	Linebackers (LB): 44 Zaire Franklin; 59 Ty'Ron Hopper; 58 Isaiah McDuffie; 31 Nick Niemann; 54 Kristian Welch; Defensive backs (DB): 7 Javon Bullard S; 2 Brandon Cisse CB; 36 Kamal Hadden CB; 29 Xavier McKinney S; 25 Keisean Nixon CB; 27 Kitan Oladapo S; 21 Benjamin St-Juste CB; 24 Carrington Valentine CB; 33 Evan Williams S; Special teams (ST): 42 Matthew Orzech LS; 28 Trey Smack K; 19 Daniel Whelan P	Practice squad: 74 Mekhi Becton T; 61 David Blay Jr. DT; 78 Dalton Cooper T; 39 Elijah Culp CB; 49 Drake Dabney TE; 48 Jack Dingle LB; 34 Kahlef Hailassie S; 20 Domani Jackson CB; 47 Nyjalik Kelly ED; 38 Lenny Krieg K (IPP); 53 Arron Mosby ED; 80 Isaiah Neyor WR; 13 Coleman Owen WR; 82 Quincy Skinner Jr. WR; 63 Mazi Smith DT; 17 Kedon Slovis QB; 68 Dillon Wade G; Reserve: 50 Zach Bako-Bewele T (IR); 91 Warren Brinson DT (IR); 30 Chris Brooks RB (IR); 56 Edgerrin Cooper LB (IR); 96 Jonathan Ford DT (IR); 98 Javon Hargrave DT (IR); 23 Skyy Moore WR (IR); 88 Luke Musgrave TE (PUP); 45 Collin Oliver ED (IR/DFR); 1 Micah Parsons ED (PUP); 11 Jayden Reed WR (IR); 97 Jordon Riley DT (PUP) 51 active, 16 practice squad (1 IPP), 12 reserve As of October 20, 2026. Rookies in italics.; Roster; Depth chart; Transactions

=== Minnesota Vikings ===
Minnesota Vikings roster
Quarterbacks (QB): 12 Max Brosmer; 1 Kyler Murray; 11 Carson Wentz; Running backs (RB): 45 Max Bredeson FB; 21 Demond Claiborne; 31 DeeJay Dallas; 33 Aaron Jones; Wide receivers (WR): 3 Jordan Addison; 13 Tai Felton; 18 Justin Jefferson; 14 Jauan Jennings; 4 Myles Price RS; Tight ends (TE): 86 Gavin Bartholomew; 87 T. J. Hockenson; 85 Ben Yurosek	Offensive linemen (OL): 64 Blake Brandel C; 71 Christian Darrisaw T; 76 Will Fries G; 60 Joe Huber G; 65 Michael Jurgens C; 69 Trevor Keegan G; 75 Brian O'Neill T; 78 Caleb Tiernan T; 72 Ryan Van Demark T; Defensive linemen (DL): 95 Caleb Banks; 90 Tyrion Ingram-Dawkins; 97 Domonique Orange; 61 Jalen Redmond; 50 Levi Drake Rodriguez; 99 Elijah Williams	Linebackers (LB): 51 Blake Cashman; 32 Chaz Chambliss OLB; 41 Jake Golday; 0 Ivan Pace Jr.; 98 Bo Richter OLB; 15 Dallas Turner OLB; 43 Andrew Van Ginkel OLB; 17 Kyle Van Noy OLB; 55 Eric Wilson; Defensive backs (DB): 20 Charles Demmings CB; 26 Theo Jackson S; 44 Josh Metellus S; 7 Byron Murphy CB; 23 James Pierre CB; 2 Isaiah Rodgers CB; 22 Harrison Smith S; 29 Jacob Thomas S; 8 Jakobe Thomas S; 5 Zemaiah Vaughn CB; 24 Jay Ward S; Special teams (ST): 42 Andrew DePaola LS; 16 Will Reichard K; 19 Brett Thorson P	Practice squad: 38 Da'Veawn Armstead CB; 57 Keshawn Banks OLB; 36 Macéo Beard S (IPP); 9 Odell Beckham Jr. WR; 89 Dillon Bell WR; 81 Michael Briscoe WR; 35 Natrone Brooks CB; 68 Henry Byrd G; 54 Kenny Dyson OLB; 83 Cam Grandy TE; 82 Jeshaun Jones WR; 59 Bangally Kamara LB; 63 Tristan Leigh T; 79 Jack Nelson T; 67 Josh Priebe G; 96 Jahvaree Ritzie DT; 37 Tavierre Thomas S; Reserve: -- Jamal Adams LB (IR); 92 Tyler Batty OLB (IR); 74 Donovan Jackson G (IR); 27 Jordan Mason RB (IR/DFR); 84 Josh Oliver TE (IR); 62 Nick Samac C (IR) 53 active, 16 practice squad (1 IPP), 6 reserve As of October 20, 2026. Rookies in italics.; Roster; Depth chart; Transactions

== NFC South ==
=== Atlanta Falcons ===
Atlanta Falcons roster
Quarterbacks (QB): 13 Andy Dalton; 9 Michael Penix Jr.; 18 Jack Strand; 1 Tua Tagovailoa; Running backs (RB): 7 Bijan Robinson; 15 Brian Robinson Jr. PR; Wide receivers (WR): 19 Chris Blair; 17 Zachariah Branch KR; 4 Jahan Dotson; 5 Drake London; 14 Olamide Zaccheaus; Tight ends (TE): 81 Austin Hooper; 87 Nick Muse; 8 Kyle Pitts; 89 Charlie Woerner	Offensive linemen (OL): 65 Matthew Bergeron G; 68 Kyle Hinton G; 72 Michael Jerrell T; 62 Corey Levin C/G; 63 Chris Lindstrom G; 70 Jake Matthews T; 64 Ryan Neuzil C; 75 Ethan Onianwa T; 71 Jawaan Taylor T; Defensive linemen (DL): 95 Gervon Dexter DT; 54 Brandon Dorlus DE; 52 Samson Ebukam DE; 96 Zach Harrison DE; 94 LaCale London DT; 92 Maason Smith DT; 55 Za'Darius Smith DE; -- Charles Snowden DE; 99 Cameron Thomas DE	Linebackers (LB): 53 Kendal Daniels; 0 Divine Deablo ILB; 45 Christian Harris; 51 Jared Ivey; 56 Harold Perkins Jr.; 46 Josh Woods; Defensive backs (DB): 3 Jessie Bates S; 33 Billy Bowman Jr. CB; 29 Sydney Brown; 36 Malcolm DeWalt CB; 28 Mike Ford CB; 23 DeMarcco Hellams S; 26 C. J. Henderson CB; 21 Mike Hughes CB; 37 Robert Longerbeam CB; 12 Avieon Terrell CB; 31 Xavier Watts S; Special teams (ST): 16 Jake Bailey P; 6 Nick Folk K; 49 Liam McCullough LS	Practice squad: 86 Vinny Anthony WR; 41 Brian Asamoah LB; 61 Kam Dewberry G; 80 Dylan Drummond WR; 25 Khalil Herbert RB; 30 Darnay Holmes CB; 91 Drake Jackson DE; 76 Riley Mahlman T; 38 Jam Miller RB; 93 Zacch Pickens DT; 43 TJ Quinn LB; 34 Jammie Robinson S; 74 Colby Sorsdal T; 67 Josh Thompson G; 84 Jack Velling TE; 82 Antwane Wells Jr. WR; Reserve: 22 Yasir Abdullah LB (IR); 40 JD Bertrand ILB (IR); 88 Beaux Collins WR (IR/DFR); 90 Da'Shawn Hand DT (IR); 50 DeAngelo Malone OLB (PUP); 77 Storm Norton T (PUP); 27 James Pearce Jr. ED (Susp.); 44 Trey Sermon RB (IR); 24 A. J. Terrell CB (IR); 98 Anterio Thompson DT (NF-Inj.); 11 Jalon Walker OLB (IR); 73 Cameron Williams T (IR) 53 active, 15 practice squad, 12 reserve As of October 20, 2026. Rookies in italics.; Roster; Depth chart; Transactions

=== Carolina Panthers ===
Carolina Panthers roster
Quarterbacks (QB): 16 Haynes King; 12 Kenny Pickett; 9 Bryce Young; Running backs (RB): 28 A. J. Dillon; 23 Trevor Etienne; 30 Chuba Hubbard; 34 Anthony Tyus III RB; Wide receivers (WR): 18 Jalen Coker; 4 Tetairoa McMillan; 13 John Metchie III RS; 83 David Moore; 87 Brycen Tremayne; Tight ends (TE): 84 Mitchell Evans; 81 Feleipe Franks; 0 Ja'Tavion Sanders; 82 Tommy Tremble; 88 Darren Waller	Offensive linemen (OL): 67 Corey Bullock G; 73 Stone Forsythe T; 77 Luke Fortner C; 57 Monroe Freeling T; 75 Sam Hecht C; 50 Robert Hunt G; 68 Damien Lewis G; 72 Taylor Moton T; 65 Torricelli Simpkins III G; 63 Rasheed Walker T; Defensive linemen (DL): 97 Bobby Brown III DT; 95 Derrick Brown DT; 93 TeRah Edwards DT; 94 Aaron Hall DT; 92 Lee Hunter DT; 98 Tershawn Wharton DT	Linebackers (LB): 33 Tyrel Dodson MLB; 52 Trevis Gipson OLB; 48 Thomas Incoom OLB; 91 Patrick Jones II OLB; 46 Jackson Kuwatch MLB; 55 Devin Lloyd MLB; 58 Bobby Okereke MLB; 5 Jaelan Phillips OLB; 3 Princely Umanmielen OLB; Defensive backs (DB): 29 Akayleb Evans CB; 24 Will Lee III CB; 7 Tre'von Moehrig S; 22 Lathan Ransom S; 21 Nick Scott S; 27 Isaiah Simmons S; 26 Chau Smith-Wade CB; 20 Zakee Wheatley S; Special teams (ST): 10 Ryan Fitzgerald K; 44 J. J. Jansen LS; 6 Sam Martin P	Practice squad: 78 Saahdiq Charles G; 32 Zion Childress CB; 96 Keith Cooper DT; 74 Jake Curhan T; 39 Nick Hampton OLB; 37 Ahmani Marshall RB; 42 Mapalo Mwansa LB (IPP); 45 Maema Njongmeta LB; 69 Parker Peterson DT; 86 Ja'seem Reed WR; 38 Robert Rochell CB; 43 DeVonta Smith CB; 15 Ihmir Smith-Marsette WR; 31 Corey Thornton CB; 85 Casey Washington WR; 35 Marco Wilson CB; Reserve: 19 Chris Brazzell II WR (IR); 25 Jonathon Brooks RB (IR); 70 Brady Christensen G (IR); 79 Ikem Ekwonu T (PUP); 8 Jaycee Horn CB (IR); 99 Cam Jackson DT (IR); 2 Mike Jackson CB (IR); 17 Xavier Legette WR (IR); 54 Bam Martin-Scott LB (IR); 11 Nic Scourton OLB (IR) 53 active, 15 practice squad (1 IPP), 10 reserve As of October 21, 2026. Rookies in italics.; Roster; Depth chart; Transactions

=== New Orleans Saints ===
New Orleans Saints roster
Quarterbacks (QB): 2 Spencer Rattler; 6 Tyler Shough; 11 Zach Wilson; Running backs (RB): 43 CJ Donaldson; 41 Alvin Kamara; 5 Kendre Miller; Wide receivers (WR): 19 Barion Brown RS; 18 Bryce Lance; 12 Chris Olave; 14 Devaughn Vele; Tight ends (TE): 4 Oscar Delp; 87 Noah Fant; 83 Juwan Johnson; 82 Treyton Welch	Offensive linemen (OL): 76 David Edwards G; 75 Taliese Fuaga T; 78 Erik McCoy C; 74 Mason Murphy T; 72 Asim Richards T; 51 Cesar Ruiz G; 66 Will Sherman G; 65 Jeremiah Wright G; Defensive linemen (DL): 97 Khristian Boyd DT; 91 Vernon Broughton DT; 92 Davon Godchaux DT; 96 Carl Granderson DE; 33 Anfernee Jennings DE; 94 Cameron Jordan DE; 52 Christen Miller DT; 95 John Ridgeway III DT; 93 Nathan Shepherd DT; 98 Tyree Wilson DE; 50 Colby Wooden DT; 99 Chase Young DE	Linebackers (LB): 55 Kaden Elliss; 53 Jaylan Ford; 58 Chris Rumph II; 44 Isaiah Stalbird; 28 Danny Stutsman; 20 Pete Werner; Defensive backs (DB): 23 Julian Blackmon S; 22 Martin Emerson CB; 31 Jordan Howden S; 1 Kool-Aid McKinstry CB; 21 Justin Reid S; 42 Michael Reid S; 25 Decamerion Richardson CB; 29 Quincy Riley CB; 7 Jonas Sanker S; 36 Lorenzo Styles Jr. S; Special teams (ST): 10 Daniel Carlson K; 17 Ryan Wright P; 49 Zach Wood LS	Practice squad: 81 Kevin Austin Jr. WR; 40 Fadil Diggs DE; 34 TJ Hall CB; 24 Jarquez Hunter RB; 73 Easton Kilty T; 85 Jalen Moreno-Cropper WR; 56 David Ojabo LB; 38 Jayden Price CB; 86 Kyrese Rowan WR; 47 Jackson Sirmon LB; 84 Stone Smartt TE; 39 Charlie Smyth K (IPP); 62 Jay'viar Suggs DT; 13 Cedric Tillman WR; 26 Zamir White RB; 54 Jonah Williams DE; 79 Alex Wollschlaeger T; Reserve: 71 Kelvin Banks Jr. T (IR); 90 Bryan Bresee DT (IR); 32 Ty Chandler RB (IR); 3 Travis Etienne RB (IR); 45 David Long CB (IR); 80 Moliki Matavao TE (IR); 77 Dillon Radunz G (IR); 64 Nick Saldiveri G (PUP); 15 Mason Tipton WR (PUP); 0 Jordyn Tyson WR (IR/DFR); 25 Rejzohn Wright CB (IR) 53 active, 16 practice squad (1 IPP), 11 reserve As of October 17, 2026. Rookies in italics.; Roster; Depth chart; Transactions

=== Tampa Bay Buccaneers ===
Tampa Bay Buccaneers roster
Quarterbacks (QB): 10 Jalon Daniels; 6 Baker Mayfield; Running backs (RB): 1 Kenneth Gainwell; 7 Bucky Irving; 44 Sean Tucker KR; Wide receivers (WR): 2 Emeka Egbuka; 14 Chris Godwin; 17 Ted Hurst; 19 Kameron Johnson RS; 15 Tez Johnson; Tight ends (TE): 87 Payne Durham; 41 Ko Kieft; 88 Cade Otton; 84 Bauer Sharp	Offensive linemen (OL): 62 Graham Barton C; 68 Ben Bredeson G; 70 Ben Chukwuma T; 65 Dan Feeney G; 67 Luke Goedeke T; 72 Luke Haggard G; 69 Cody Mauch G; 75 Billy Schrauth G; 77 Justin Skule T; 78 Tristan Wirfs T; Defensive linemen (DL): 90 DeMonte Capehart DT; 94 Calijah Kancey DT; 56 Rakeem Nuñez-Roches NT; 95 Elijah Roberts DT; 91 A'Shawn Robinson DT; 92 Elijah Simmons NT; 50 Vita Vea NT	Linebackers (LB): 34 Alex Anzalone ILB; 3 Rueben Bain Jr. OLB; 8 SirVocea Dennis ILB; 0 YaYa Diaby OLB; 97 Al-Quadin Muhammad OLB; 98 Anthony Nelson OLB; 52 Christian Rozeboom ILB; 45 Josiah Trotter ILB; 51 David Walker OLB; Defensive backs (DB): 24 Ayden Garnes CB; 29 Miles Killebrew S; 38 Kevin Knowles CB; 27 Zyon McCollum CB; 5 Ifeatu Melifonwu S; 21 Benjamin Morrison CB; 25 Jacob Parrish CB; 22 Keionte Scott; 23 Tykee Smith S; 31 Antoine Winfield Jr. S; Special teams (ST): 86 Evan Deckers LS; 9 Riley Dixon P; 4 Chase McLaughlin K	Practice squad: 82 CJ Dippre TE; 46 Caden Fordham LB; 85 Garrett Greene WR; 57 Yasir Holmes OLB; 28 Brandon Johnson CB; 93 Jayson Jones NT; 61 Henry Lutovsky G; 81 Dean Patterson WR; 83 Eric Rivers WR; 36 J. J. Roberts S; 76 Paul Rubelt T (IPP); 8 Brett Rypien QB; 66 Ben Scott G; 16 Easton Stick QB; 33 Silas Walters S; 18 Josh Williams RB; 48 Javin Wright LB; Reserve: 32 Josh Hayes CB (IR); 59 Mohamed Kamara OLB (IR); 11 Jalen McMillan WR (IR); 80 David Sills WR (IR) 53 active, 16 practice squad (1 IPP), 4 reserve As of October 18, 2026. Rookies in italics.; Roster; Depth chart; Transactions

== NFC West ==
=== Arizona Cardinals ===
Arizona Cardinals roster
Quarterbacks (QB): 19 Carson Beck; 7 Jacoby Brissett; 15 Gardner Minshew; Running backs (RB): 22 Tyler Allgeier; 20 Bam Knight; 4 Jeremiyah Love; Wide receivers (WR): 17 Kendrick Bourne; 86 Jalen Brooks; 81 Devin Duvernay RS; 80 Simi Fehoko; 82 Reggie Virgil; 14 Michael Wilson; Tight ends (TE): 44 Shawn Bowman; 84 Elijah Higgins; 85 Trey McBride; 47 Teagan Quitoriano	Offensive linemen (OL): 58 Hayden Conner G; 72 Hjalte Froholdt C; 78 Josh Fryar T; 71 Jon Gaines II G; 73 Isaac Seumalo G; 65 Elijah Wilkinson T; 66 Jayden Williams T; 79 Jedrick Wills T; Defensive linemen (DL): 95 Andrew Billings NT; 91 L. J. Collier DE; 51 Roy Lopez NT; 97 Walter Nolen DE; 56 Darius Robinson DE; 55 Dante Stills DE	Linebackers (LB): 5 Baron Browning OLB; 52 Jordan Burch OLB; 25 Zaven Collins OLB; 50 Jack Gibbens ILB; 54 Eku Leota OLB; 43 Karson Sharar ILB; 0 Cody Simon ILB; 10 Josh Sweat OLB; 1 Mack Wilson ILB; Defensive backs (DB): 3 Budda Baker S; 29 Denzel Burke CB; 13 Kei'Trel Clark CB; 36 Kitan Crawford S; 35 Kalen King CB; 16 Max Melton CB; 42 Dadrion Taylor-Demerson S; 24 Starling Thomas V CB; 21 Garrett Williams CB; 31 Wydett Williams Jr. S; 28 Andrew Wingard S; Special teams (ST): 12 Blake Gillikin P; 59 Casey Kreiter LS; 38 Chad Ryland K	Practice squad: 76 Austin Deculus T; 64 Kingsley Eguakun C; 34 Jerome Ford RB; 23 Art Green CB; 98 Jared Harrison-Hunte DE; 93 Cam Horsley NT; 26 Evan Hull RB; 30 Shedrick Jackson WR; 67 Demontrey Jacobs T; 37 Mark Perry S; 33 Jerrick Reed II S; 49 Cameron Robertson OLB; 69 Valentin Senn G (IPP); 83 Harrison Wallace III WR; 96 Damonic Williams NT; 53 Riley Wilson LB; 45 Kenny Yeboah TE; Reserve: 74 Isaiah Adams G (IR); 33 Trey Benson RB (IR); 57 Chase Bisontis G (IR); 32 Joey Blount S (IR); 90 Zachary Carter NT (IR/DFR); 6 James Conner RB (IR/DFR); 46 Jameson Geers TE (IR); 70 Paris Johnson Jr. T (IR); 2 Will Johnson CB (IR); 89 Hunter Long TE (IR); 94 Kaleb Proctor DE (IR); 87 Tip Reiman TE (PUP) 53 active, 16 practice squad (1 IPP), 12 reserve As of October 17, 2026. Rookies in italics.; Roster; Depth chart; Transactions

=== Los Angeles Rams ===
Los Angeles Rams roster
Quarterbacks (QB): 13 Stetson Bennett; 15 Ty Simpson; 9 Matthew Stafford; Running backs (RB): 33 Dean Connors; 24 Blake Corum; 23 Kyren Williams; Wide receivers (WR): 8 Tutu Atwell; 11 Alex Bachman PR; 6 CJ Daniels; 4 Konata Mumpfield; 12 Puka Nacua; 88 Jordan Whittington KR; Tight ends (TE): 87 Davis Allen; 89 Tyler Higbee; 86 Max Klare; 84 Colby Parkinson	Offensive linemen (OL): 73 Steve Avila G; 69 Kevin Dotson G; 77 Alaric Jackson T; 50 Beaux Limmer G; 71 Warren McClendon T; 63 Dylan McMahon C; 66 Bill Murray G; 68 David Quessenberry T; 65 Coleman Shelton C; 79 Keagen Trost T; Defensive linemen (DL): 90 Tyler Davis DE; 99 Aaron Donald DE; 55 Braden Fiske DE; 57 Ty Hamilton NT; 52 Larrell Murchison DE	Linebackers (LB): 47 Wesley Bailey OLB; 56 Shaun Dolac ILB; 94 Desjuan Johnson OLB; 53 Nate Landman ILB; 59 Darryl Peterson III OLB; 48 Omar Speights ILB; 10 Josaiah Stewart OLB; 44 Grant Stuard ILB; 0 Byron Young OLB; Defensive backs (DB): 3 Kamren Curl S; 1 Emmanuel Forbes CB; 5 Kamren Kinchens S; 37 Quentin Lake S; 2 Jaylen McCollough S; 22 Trent McDuffie CB; 36 Maximus Pulley S; 30 Josh Wallace CB; 35 Jaylen Watson CB; Special teams (ST): 49 Joe Cardona LS; 42 Ethan Evans P; 16 Brandon McManus K	Practice squad: 45 Nick Andersen S; 64 Austin Blaske T; 14 Jack Bouwmeester P (IPP); 25 Nyzier Fourqurean CB; 72 Blake Hance G; -- Jalen Hunt NT; 34 Tanner Ingle S; 54 Eric Kendricks LB; 21 Cam Lampkin CB; 98 Jaxson Moi DT; 58 Elias Neal ILB; 51 Garrett Nelson LB; 93 Bill Norton DE; 81 Brennan Presley WR; 83 Dan Villari TE; 32 Jordan Waters RB; 26 Damarion Williams CB; Reserve: 17 Davante Adams WR (IR); 2 Matthew Caldwell QB (IR); 67 Justin Dedich G (IR); 18 Terrance Ferguson TE (IR); 97 Poona Ford NT (IR); 95 Myles Garrett OLB (IR); 19 Blake Grupe K (IR); 20 Ronnie Rivers RB (IR); 11 Keir Thomas OLB (IR); 91 Kobie Turner DE (IR); 51 Eddie Walls III OLB (IR) 52 active, 16 practice squad (1 IPP), 11 reserve As of October 21, 2026. Rookies in italics.; Roster; Depth chart; Transactions

=== San Francisco 49ers ===
San Francisco 49ers roster
Quarterbacks (QB): 10 Mac Jones; 13 Brock Purdy; 14 Kurtis Rourke; Running backs (RB): 26 Kaelon Black; 29 Jordan James; 44 Kyle Juszczyk FB; 23 Christian McCaffrey; Wide receivers (WR): 84 Brandin Cooks; 4 Jacob Cowing PR; 5 Mike Evans; 19 Deebo Samuel KR; 17 Jordan Watkins; Tight ends (TE): 89 Luke Farrell; 85 George Kittle; 9 Brayden Willis	Offensive linemen (OL): 64 Jake Brendel C; 75 Connor Colby G; 69 Enrique Cruz Jr. T; 76 Vederian Lowe T; 68 Colton McKivitz T; 58 Jarrett Patterson C; 77 Dominick Puni G; 71 Trent Williams T; 74 Carver Willis G; Defensive linemen (DL): 97 Nick Bosa DE; 93 Gracen Halton DT; 94 Romello Height DE; 50 Naquan Jones DT; 47 Khalid Kareem DE; 92 Osa Odighizuwa DT; 59 Ogbo Okoronkwo DE; 96 James Thompson Jr. DT; 55 Sebastian Valdez DT; 56 Keion White DE; 98 Mykel Williams DE	Linebackers (LB): 48 Tatum Bethune; 53 Jaden Dugger; 51 Luke Gifford; 49 Garret Wallow; 54 Fred Warner; Defensive backs (DB): 27 Ji'Ayir Brown S; 24 Ashtyn Davis S; 0 Renardo Green CB; 25 Jack Jones CB; 2 Deommodore Lenoir CB; 6 Malik Mustapha S; 33 Siran Neal S; 28 Ephesians Prysock CB; 36 Marques Sigle S; 20 Upton Stout CB; Special teams (ST): 18 Eddy Piñeiro K; 15 Corliss Waitman P; 46 Jon Weeks LS	Practice squad: 67 Isaac Alarcón T (IPP); 40 Brandon Codrington CB; 82 Khalil Dinkins TE; 63 Viliami Fehoko DE; 90 Kevin Givens DT; 41 Jalen Graham LB; 81 Wesley Grimes WR; 65 McKinnley Jackson DT; -- Naquan Jones DL; 35 Sincere McCormick RB; 66 Drake Nugent C; 18 Will Pauling WR; 61 Foster Sarell T; 15 Xavier Smith WR; 83 Jack Stoll TE; 38 Jalen Stroman S; 6 Malik Turner WR; Reserve: -- Brandon Aiyuk WR (Left squad); 95 Alfred Collins DT (IR); 50 Andrew Farmer DE (IR); 29 Darrick Forrest S (IR); 57 Dre Greenlaw LB (Susp.); 31 Isaac Guerendo RB (PUP); 22 Nate Hobbs CB (IR); 59 Mikail Kamara DE (IR); 3 Christian Kirk WR (IR); 45 Nick Martin LB (IR); 91 Sam Okuayinonu DE (IR); 1 Ricky Pearsall WR (IR); 62 Austen Pleasants T (IR); 11 Demarcus Robinson WR (IR); 7 De'Zhaun Stribling WR (IR); 88 Jake Tonges TE (IR); 99 CJ West DT (IR); 63 Nick Zakelj G (IR) 53 active, 16 practice squad (1 IPP), 18 reserve As of October 21, 2026. Rookies in italics.; Roster; Depth chart; Transactions

=== Seattle Seahawks ===
Seattle Seahawks roster
Quarterbacks (QB): 14 Sam Darnold; 2 Drew Lock; 6 Jalen Milroe; Running backs (RB): 30 Robert Henry Jr.; 36 George Holani; 33 Velus Jones Jr.; 38 Brady Russell FB; 23 Emanuel Wilson; Wide receivers (WR): 87 Montorie Foster; 15 Tory Horton; 10 Cooper Kupp; 22 Rashid Shaheed RS; 11 Jaxon Smith-Njigba; Tight ends (TE): 18 Elijah Arroyo; 88 AJ Barner; 89 Nick Kallerup; 81 Eric Saubert	Offensive linemen (OL): 67 Charles Cross T; 64 Christian Haynes G; 74 Josh Jones G/T; 72 Abraham Lucas T; 55 Olu Oluwatimi C; 70 Beau Stephens G; 61 Jalen Sundell C; 76 Grey Zabel G; Defensive linemen (DL): 98 Rylie Mills DE; 94 Mike Morris DE; 91 Byron Murphy II DT; 95 Brandon Pili NT; 90 Jarran Reed NT; 99 Leonard Williams DT	Linebackers (LB): 56 Dante Fowler OLB; 58 Derick Hall OLB; 13 Ernest Jones ILB; 48 Tyrice Knight OLB; 0 DeMarcus Lawrence OLB; 7 Uchenna Nwosu OLB; 52 Patrick O'Connell ILB; 57 Connor O'Toole OLB; 44 Chazz Surratt OLB; 32 Drake Thomas OLB; Defensive backs (DB): 16 Trevon Diggs CB; 3 Nick Emmanwori S; 29 Josh Jobe CB; 20 Julian Love S; 39 Ty Okada S; 28 Nehemiah Pritchett CB; 27 Avery Smith CB; 24 Rodney Thomas II S; 21 Devon Witherspoon CB; Special teams (ST): 4 Michael Dickson P; 5 Jason Myers K; 41 Chris Stoll LS	Practice squad: 42 Jackson Acker FB; 73 Logan Brown T; 85 Irvin Charles WR; 46 Jimmy Ciarlo LB; 37 Michael Dansby CB; 82 Josiah Deguara TE; 97 Deven Eastern NT; 30 AJ Finley S; 35 Andre Fuller CB; 68 Bobby Hart T; 84 Emmanuel Henderson WR; 42 Maxen Hook S; 93 Aidan Hubbard LB; 62 Federico Maranges C (IPP); 47 Josh Ross LB; 77 Gary Smith III DT; 86 Ricky White WR; 31 Jacardia Wright RB (PS/I); Reserve: 17 Terrion Arnold CB (Exempt); 19 Jake Bobo WR (IR); 75 Anthony Bradford G (IR/DFR); 26 Zach Charbonnet RB (PUP); 9 Bud Clark S (IR); 1 Julian Neal CB (IR); 40 Robbie Ouzts FB (IR); 8 Jadarian Price RB (IR); 78 Mason Richman T/G (IR) 53 active, 16 practice squad (2 IPP), 9 reserve As of October 21, 2026. Rookies in italics.; Roster; Depth chart; Transactions

== See also ==
- List of current AFC team rosters
