= 2026 Tampa Bay Buccaneers season =

51st season in franchise history

- Owner: The Glazer family
- General manager: Jason Licht
- President: Darcie Glazer Kassewitz
- Head coach: Todd Bowles
- Offensive coordinator: Zac Robinson
- Defensive coordinator: Todd Bowles (de facto)
- Home stadium: Raymond James Stadium

Results
- Record: 3–7
- Division place: 2nd NFC South

Uniform
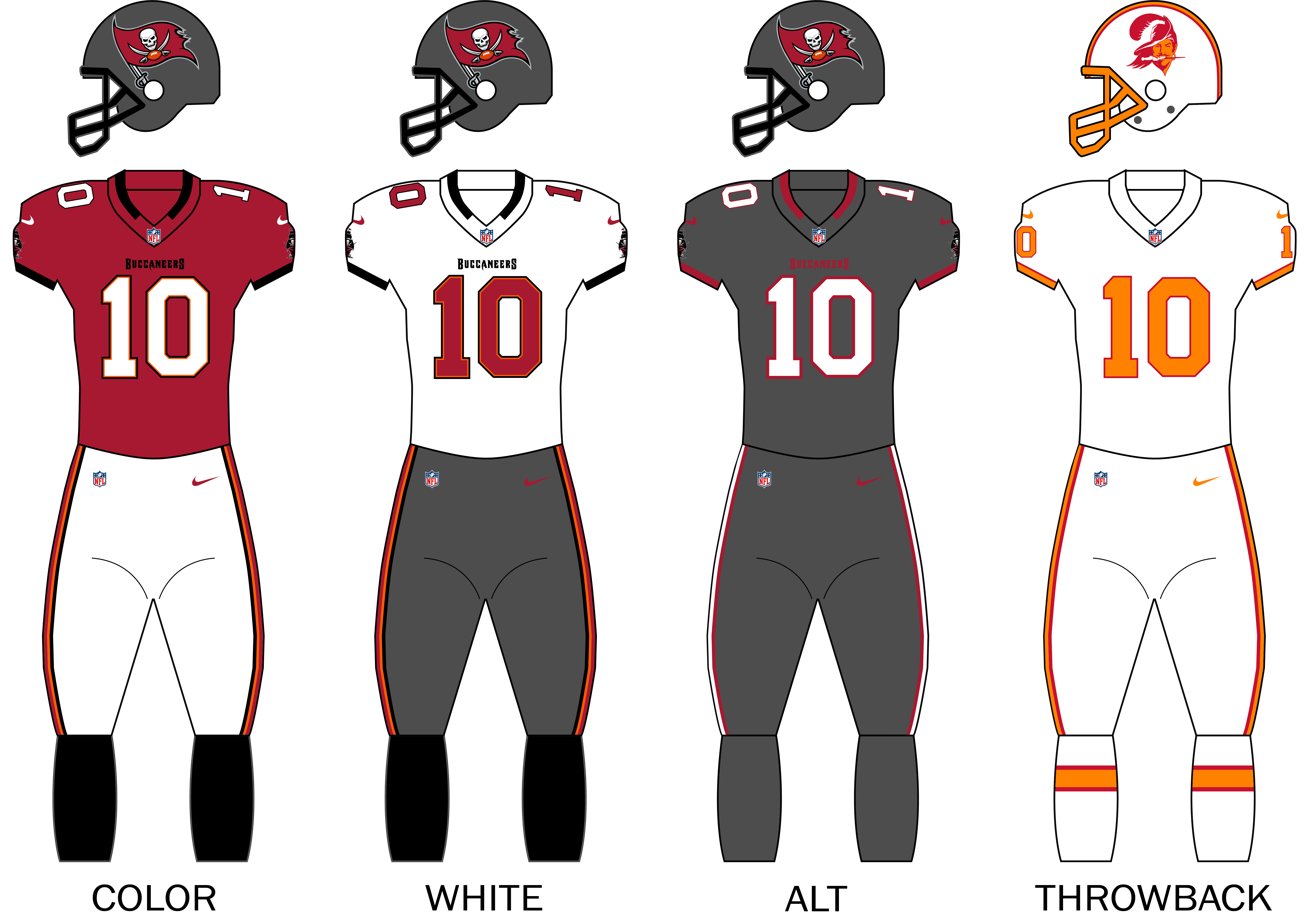

The 2026 season is the Tampa Bay Buccaneers' 51st in the National Football League (NFL), their 13th under the leadership of general manager Jason Licht, their 29th playing their home games at Raymond James Stadium and their fifth under head coach Todd Bowles. The Buccaneers will seek to improve upon their 8–9 record from the previous season, return to the playoffs after a one-year absence, and reclaim the NFC South title. This season will begin with the team's fifth offensive coordinator in as many seasons.

The Buccaneers had their first 0–4 start since 2013.

During the offseason, wide receiver Mike Evans left the team after twelve seasons and signed with the San Francisco 49ers. In addition, linebacker Lavonte David retired after 14 seasons. On September 8, quarterback Baker Mayfield, entering his fourth season with the club, signed a three-year contract extension.

On June 23, 2026, Tony Castricone was hired as the new radio voice of the Buccaneers after the retirement of Gene Deckerhoff.

== Offseason ==
=== Draft ===
2026 Tampa Bay Buccaneers draft selections
Round	Selection	Player	Position	College	Notes
1	15	Rueben Bain Jr.	OLB	Miami (FL)	
2	46	Josiah Trotter	LB	Missouri	
3	77	Traded to the Green Bay Packers (Note: The Buccaneers traded a third-round selection (77th overall) to the Green Bay Packers in exchange for a third-round selection (84th overall) and a fifth-round selection (160th overall).)			
3	84	Ted Hurst	WR	Georgia State	From Packers
4	116	Keionte Scott	CB	Miami (FL)	
5	155	DeMonte Capehart	DT	Clemson	
5	160	Billy Schrauth	G	Notre Dame	From Packers
6	185	Bauer Sharp	TE	LSU	From Raiders (Note: The Buccaneers traded sixth- and seventh-round selections (195th and 229th overall) to the Las Vegas Raiders in exchange for a sixth-round selection (185th overall).)
6	195	Traded to the Las Vegas Raiders			
7	229	Traded to the Las Vegas Raiders			

Draft trades

2026 Tampa Bay Buccaneers undrafted free agents
Name	Position	College	Ref.
Wesley Brown	LS	Fresno State	
Ja'Qurious Conley	S	Charlotte	
Jalon Daniels	QB	Kansas	
Kenny Fletcher Jr.	TE	Rutgers	
Caden Fordham	LB	NC State	
Ayden Garnes	CB	Arizona	
Josiah Green	DL	Duke	
Aidan Laros	P	Kentucky	
Henry Lutovsky	G	Nebraska	
Deshawn McKinght	DL	Arizona	
Jack Pyburn	OLB	LSU	
Eric Rivers	WR	Georgia Tech	
Paul Rubelt	OT	UCF	
Noah Short	WR	Army	
Javin Wright	LB	Nebraska	
Kadarius Calloway	RB	New Mexico State	
Yasir Holmes	LB	Tarleton State	
Dean Patterson	WR	Georgia Tech	
Barika Kpeenu	RB	North Dakota State	

== Staff ==
Tampa Bay Buccaneers staff
Front office: Co-owner/co-chairman – Bryan Glazer; Co-owner/co-chairman – Edward Glazer; Co-owner/co-chairman – Joel Glazer; Co-owner/president – Darcie Glazer Kassewitz; Co-owner – Avram Glazer; Co-owner – Kevin Glazer; General manager – Jason Licht; Assistant general manager – Mike Greenberg; Assistant general manager – Rob McCartney; Vice president of player personnel – Mike Biehl; Vice president of football operations – Shelton Quarles; Senior personnel executive – Byron Kiefer; Vice president of player engagement – Duke Preston; Vice president of football research – Jacqueline Davidson; Senior advisor to the general manager – Bruce Arians; Director of player personnel – Shane Scannell; Assistant director of pro scouting – Sean Conley; Assistant director of pro scouting – Donovan Cotton; Director of college scouting – Tony Hardie; Director of football research – Zach Beistline; Manager of football administration and scouting operations - Peighton Roth; Senior national scout – Andy Speyer; Head coaches: Head coach – Todd Bowles; Offensive coaches: Offensive coordinator – Zac Robinson; Pass game coordinator – T.J. Yates; Quarterbacks – Chandler Whitmer; Running backs – Skip Peete; Wide receivers – Bryan McClendon; Tight ends – Justin Peelle; Assistant tight ends – Jeff Kastl; Run game coordinator/offensive line – Kevin Carberry; Assistant offensive line – Andrew Mitchell; Senior offensive assistant/pass game specialist – Ken Zampese	Defensive coaches: Pass game coordinator – George Edwards; Defensive line – Marcus West; Run game coordinator/outside linebackers – Larry Foote; Inside linebackers – Mike Caldwell; Cornerbacks – Rashad Johnson; Safeties – Tim Atkins; Defensive assistant – Todd Bowles Jr.; Defensive quality control – Joey Fitzgerald; Special teams coaches: Special teams coordinator – Danny Smith; Special teams assistant – Luke Smith; Coaching operations: Senior manager of coaching operations – Sarah Evans; Strength and conditioning: Head strength and conditioning – Chad Wade; Assistant strength and conditioning – Cory Bichey; Assistant strength and conditioning – DeAndre Ward Sr; → Coaching staff → Front office → More NFL staffs

== Current roster ==
Tampa Bay Buccaneers roster
Quarterbacks (QB): 10 Jalon Daniels; 6 Baker Mayfield; 16 Easton Stick; Running backs (RB): 1 Kenneth Gainwell; 7 Bucky Irving; 44 Sean Tucker KR; Wide receivers (WR): 2 Emeka Egbuka; 14 Chris Godwin; 17 Ted Hurst; 19 Kameron Johnson RS; 15 Tez Johnson; Tight ends (TE): 87 Payne Durham; 41 Ko Kieft; 88 Cade Otton; 84 Bauer Sharp	Offensive linemen (OL): 62 Graham Barton C; 68 Ben Bredeson G; 70 Ben Chukwuma T; 65 Dan Feeney G; 67 Luke Goedeke T; 64 Trevor Keegan G; 69 Cody Mauch G; 75 Billy Schrauth G; 77 Justin Skule T; 78 Tristan Wirfs T; Defensive linemen (DL): 90 DeMonte Capehart DT; 94 Calijah Kancey DT; 56 Rakeem Nuñez-Roches NT; 95 Elijah Roberts DT; 91 A'Shawn Robinson DT; 92 Elijah Simmons NT; 50 Vita Vea NT	Linebackers (LB): 34 Alex Anzalone ILB; 3 Rueben Bain Jr. OLB; 8 SirVocea Dennis ILB; 0 YaYa Diaby OLB; 97 Al-Quadin Muhammad OLB; 98 Anthony Nelson OLB; 45 Josiah Trotter ILB; 51 David Walker OLB; Defensive backs (DB): 24 Ayden Garnes CB; 29 Miles Killebrew S; 38 Kevin Knowles CB; 27 Zyon McCollum CB; 5 Ifeatu Melifonwu S; 21 Benjamin Morrison CB; 25 Jacob Parrish CB; 22 Keionte Scott; 23 Tykee Smith S; 31 Antoine Winfield Jr. S; Special teams (ST): 86 Evan Deckers LS; 9 Riley Dixon P; 4 Chase McLaughlin K	Practice squad: 82 CJ Dippre TE; 46 Caden Fordham LB; 85 Garrett Greene WR; 72 Luke Haggard G; 57 Yasir Holmes OLB; 93 Jayson Jones NT; 61 Henry Lutovsky G; 81 Dean Patterson WR; 83 Eric Rivers WR; 36 J. J. Roberts S; 76 Paul Rubelt T (IPP); -- Cooper Rush QB; 66 Ben Scott G; 80 David Sills WR; 33 Silas Walters S; 18 Josh Williams RB; 48 Javin Wright LB; Reserve: 32 Josh Hayes CB (IR); 59 Mohamed Kamara OLB (IR); 11 Jalen McMillan WR (IR); 52 Christian Rozeboom ILB (IR) 53 active, 16 practice squad (1 IPP), 4 reserve As of November 16, 2026. Rookies in italics.; Roster; Depth chart; Transactions

=== Preseason depth chart ===
Defense

FS
Antoine Winfield Jr. NB Jacob Parrish
Ifeatu Melifonwu NB Keionte Scott
J. J. Roberts
Marcus Banks

OLB	ILB	ILB	OLB
YaYa Diaby	Alex Anzalone	Christian Rozeboom	Rueben Bain Jr.
Al-Quadin Muhammad	Josiah Trotter	SirVocea Dennis	Anthony Nelson
David Walker; Jack Pyburn	John Bullock; Javin Wright	Nick Jackson; Caden Fordham	Chris Braswell; Mohamed Kamara

SS
Tykee Smith
Rashad Wisdom
Miles Killebrew
Xavier Williams

CB
Benjamin Morrison
Damarion Williams
Roman Parodie

DE	NT	DE
Calijah Kancey	Vita Vea	A'Shawn Robinson
Elijah Roberts	DeMonte Capehart	Rakeem Nuñez-Roches
Deshawn McKnight	Elijah Simmons; Jayson Jones	Josiah Green

CB
Zyon McCollum
Ayden Garnes
Josh Hayes

Offense

WR
Chris Godwin
Tez Johnson
Garrett Greene
Eric Rivers

WR
Jalen McMillan
Kameron Johnson
David Sills
Dennis Houston

LT	LG	C	RG	RT
Tristan Wirfs	Ben Bredeson	Graham Barton	Cody Mauch	Luke Goedeke
Justin Skule	Elijah Klein	Dan Feeney	Luke Haggard	Ben Chukwuma
Paul Rubelt	Henry Lutovsky	Ben Scott	Nash Hutmacher	Marshall Foerner

TE
Cade Otton
Payne Durham
Bauer Sharp
Ko Kieft
Devin Culp
Kenny Fletcher Jr.

WR
Emeka Egbuka
Ted Hurst
Dean Patterson

QB
Baker Mayfield
Jake Browning
Connor Bazelak
Jalon Daniels

RB
Bucky Irving
Kenneth Gainwell
Sean Tucker
Josh Williams
Kadarius Calloway

Special teams

== Preseason ==
Week	Date	Opponent	Result	Record	Venue	Recap
1	August 14	at New York Jets	W 24–16	1–0	MetLife Stadium	Recap
2	August 22	Kansas City Chiefs	W 16–15	2–0	Raymond James Stadium	Recap
3	August 28	at Jacksonville Jaguars	L 0–19	2–1	EverBank Stadium	Recap

== Regular season ==
=== Schedule ===
Week	Date	Time (ET)	Opponent	Result	Record	Venue	Network	Recap
1	September 13	1:00 p.m.	at Cincinnati Bengals	**L** 27–33	0–1	Paycor Stadium	Fox	Recap
2	September 20	1:00 p.m.	Cleveland Browns	**L** 19–23	0–2	Raymond James Stadium	CBS	Recap
3	September 27	4:05 p.m.	Minnesota Vikings	**L** 16–23	0–3	Raymond James Stadium	Fox	Recap
4	October 4	1:00 p.m.	Green Bay Packers	**L** 14–17	0–4	Raymond James Stadium	Fox	Recap
5	October 8	8:15 p.m.	at Dallas Cowboys	**W** 24–16	1–4	AT&T Stadium	Prime Video	Recap
6	October 18	1:00 p.m.	Pittsburgh Steelers	**L** 19–26 (OT)	1–5	Raymond James Stadium	CBS	Recap
7	October 25	1:00 p.m.	at **Carolina Panthers**	**W** 43–13	2–5	Bank of America Stadium	Fox	Recap
8	November 1	1:00 p.m.	**Atlanta Falcons**	**W** 16–0	3–5	Raymond James Stadium	Fox	Recap
9	November 8	8:20 p.m.	at Chicago Bears	**L** 24–27	3–6	Soldier Field	NBC	Recap
10	Bye							
11	November 22	1:00 p.m.	at Detroit Lions	**L** 21–31	3–7	Ford Field	Fox	Recap
12	November 30	8:15 p.m.	**Carolina Panthers**			Raymond James Stadium	ESPN	
13	December 6	1:00 p.m.	Los Angeles Chargers			Raymond James Stadium	CBS	
14	December 13	1:00 p.m.	at Baltimore Ravens			M&T Bank Stadium	Fox	
15	December 20	1:00 p.m.	**New Orleans Saints**			Raymond James Stadium	Fox	
16	December 26/27	TBD	at **Atlanta Falcons**			Mercedes-Benz Stadium	TBD	
17	January 2/3	TBD	Los Angeles Rams			Raymond James Stadium	TBD	
18	January 9/10	TBD	at **New Orleans Saints**			Caesars Superdome	TBD	

Notes

- Intra-division opponents are in **bold** text.
- Networks, dates and times from Weeks 13–15 are subject to change as a result of flexible scheduling.
- The date, time and network for games in Weeks 16 and 17 will be finalized by no later than two weeks prior to each game.
- The date, time and network for Week 18 will be finalized at the end of Week 17.

=== Game summaries ===
==== Week 1: at Cincinnati Bengals ====
Week 1: Tampa Bay Buccaneers at Cincinnati Bengals – Game summary

Quarter	1	2	3	4	Total
Buccaneers	3	7	10	7	**27**
**Bengals**	14	10	3	6	**33**

at Paycor Stadium, Cincinnati, Ohio

- Date: September 13
- Game time: 1:00 p.m. EDT
- Game weather: Sunny, 85 °F (29 °C)
- Game attendance: 66,625
- Referee: John Hussey
- TV announcers (Fox): Kevin Kugler, Daryl Johnston and Allison Williams
- Recap, Game Book

Game information

**First quarter**

- TB – Chase McLaughlin 34-yard field goal, 9:09. Buccaneers 3–0. **Drive: 11 plays, 56 yards, 5:51.**
- CIN – Demetrius Knight 27-yard fumble return, 6:18. Bengals 7–3.
- CIN – Mike Gesicki 2-yard pass from Joe Burrow (Evan McPherson kick), 1:48. Bengals 14–3. **Drive: 7 plays, 33 yards, 3:34.**

**Second quarter**

- CIN – Chase Brown 5-yard run (Evan McPherson kick), 5:32. Bengals 21–3. **Drive: 12 plays, 80 yards, 6:32.**
- TB – Bucky Irving 10-yard run (Chase McLaughlin kick), 1:49. Bengals 21–10. **Drive: 6 plays, 75 yards, 3:43.**
- CIN – Evan McPherson 20-yard field goal, 0:06. Bengals 24–10. **Drive: 10 plays, 70 yards, 1:43.**

**Third quarter**

- CIN – Evan McPherson 55-yard field goal, 10:03. Bengals 27–10. **Drive: 8 plays, 36 yards, 4:57.**
- TB – Chase McLaughlin 51-yard field goal, 3:41. Bengals 27–13. **Drive: 10 plays, 38 yards, 6:22.**
- TB – Josiah Trotter 38-yard interception return, 2:16. Bengals 27–20.

**Fourth quarter**

- CIN – Evan McPherson 58-yard field goal, 14:04. Bengals 30–20. **Drive: 8 plays, 43 yards, 3:12.**
- CIN – Evan McPherson 32-yard field goal, 5:19. Bengals 33–20. **Drive: 8 plays, 31 yards, 5:12.**
- TB – Baker Mayfield 9-yard run (Chase McLaughlin kick), 3:19. Bengals 33–27. **Drive: 7 plays, 51 yards, 2:00.**

**Top passers**

- TB – Baker Mayfield – 23/28, 216 yards
- CIN – Joe Burrow – 25/35, 254 yards, TD, INT

**Top rushers**

- TB – Bucky Irving – 8 rushes, 45 yards, TD
- CIN – Chase Brown – 16 rushes, 56 yards, TD

**Top receivers**

- TB – Emeka Egbuka – 5 receptions, 63 yards
- CIN – Mike Gesicki – 5 receptions, 78 yards, TD

The Cincinnati defense forced four turnovers, including a fumble scooped up and returned for a touchdown, and defeated Tampa Bay 33–27. Quarterback Baker Mayfield had three fumbles lost, including one on a scramble in which he lost the ball at the 4 yard line, and it was recovered by the Bengals in the end zone for a touchback. Josiah Trotter's 38-yard interception return in the third quarter brought Tampa Bay back to within 7 points. Mayfield scored on a 9-yard rush with 3:19 left in regulation, narrowing the deficit to 33–27. However, the Buccaneers were unable to get the ball back, and Cincinnati ran out the clock to secure the victory. It was Tampa Bay's first loss in Week 1 since 2020, snapping a five-year win streak.

==== Week 2: vs. Cleveland Browns ====
Week 2: Cleveland Browns at Tampa Bay Buccaneers – Game summary

Quarter	1	2	3	4	Total
**Browns**	3	3	10	7	**23**
Buccaneers	6	3	7	3	**19**

at Raymond James Stadium, Tampa, Florida

- Date: September 20
- Game time: 1:00 p.m. EDT
- Game weather: Cloudy, 86 °F (30 °C)
- Game attendance: 61,391
- Referee: Brad Rogers
- TV announcers (CBS): Tom McCarthy, Robert Turbin and Tiffany Blackmon
- Recap, Game Book

Game information

**First quarter**

- TB – Chase McLaughlin 59-yard field goal, 11:10. Buccaneers 3–0. **Drive: 5 plays, 23 yards, 2:06.**
- CLE – Andre Szmyt 50-yard field goal, 7:12. Tied 3–3. **Drive: 7 plays, 40 yards, 3:58.**
- TB – Chase McLaughlin 45-yard field goal, 4:02. Buccaneers 6–3. **Drive: 6 plays, 48 yards, 3:10.**

**Second quarter**

- CLE – Andre Szmyt 34-yard field goal, 13:59. Tied 6–6. **Drive: 6 plays, 12 yards, 2:10.**
- TB – Chase McLaughlin 31-yard field goal, 0:12. Buccaneers 9–6. **Drive: 9 plays, 21 yards, 2:33.**

**Third quarter**

- TB – Emeka Egbuka 5-yard pass from Baker Mayfield (Chase McLaughlin kick), 9:33. Buccaneers 16–6. **Drive: 9 plays, 65 yards, 5:27.**
- CLE – Andre Szmyt 34-yard field goal, 3:45. Buccaneers 16–9. **Drive: 11 plays, 58 yards, 5:48.**
- CLE – Denzel Boston 55-yard pass from Deshaun Watson (Andre Szmyt kick), 1:23. Tied 16–16. **Drive: 3 plays, 83 yards, 1:06.**

**Fourth quarter**

- TB – Chase McLaughlin 31-yard field goal, 9:58. Buccaneers 19–16. **Drive: 7 plays, 71 yards, 2:53.**
- CLE – Blake Whiteheart 17-yard pass from Deshaun Watson (Andre Szmyt kick), 3:51. Browns 23–19. **Drive: 12 plays, 68 yards, 6:07.**

**Top passers**

- CLE – Deshaun Watson – 24/30, 238 yards, 2 TD
- TB – Baker Mayfield – 21/34, 182 yards, TD, INT

**Top rushers**

- CLE – Deshaun Watson – 7 rushes, 22 yards
- TB – Bucky Irving – 17 rushes, 89 yards

**Top receivers**

- CLE – Denzel Boston – 5 receptions, 95 yards, TD
- TB – Tez Johnson – 1 reception, 49 yards

Tampa Bay blew a 10-point lead and lost to Cleveland 23–19. Deshaun Watson connected with Blake Whiteheart for a go-ahead 17-yard touchdown pass with 3:51 to go. The Buccaneers then started driving down the field, but lightning in the area at the two-minute warning halted the game. After a delay of approximately two hours and 12 minutes, the Buccaneers resumed with the ball at the Cleveland 28 yard line. With 22 seconds on the clock, on fourth and 11 at the 20 yard line, Baker Mayfield's pass to Emeka Egbuka was incomplete in the endzone, and the Browns held on to win.

It was Tampa Bay's sixth loss in the last seven games, and first 0–2 start since 2014. This was also the Buccaneers' first home loss against Cleveland since 1989.

==== Week 3: vs. Minnesota Vikings ====
Week 3: Minnesota Vikings at Tampa Bay Buccaneers – Game summary

Quarter	1	2	3	4	Total
**Vikings**	10	7	0	6	**23**
Buccaneers	7	3	3	3	**16**

at Raymond James Stadium, Tampa, Florida

- Date: September 27
- Game time: 4:05 p.m. EDT
- Game weather: Cloudy, 84 °F (29 °C)
- Game attendance: 61,212
- Referee: Scott Novak
- TV announcers (Fox): Kenny Albert, Jonathan Vilma and Megan Olivi
- Recap, Game Book

Game information

**First quarter**

- MIN – Will Reichard 54-yard field goal, 10:20. Vikings 3–0. **Drive: 7 plays, 40 yards, 4:40.**
- MIN – Myles Price 86-yard punt return, 8:43. Vikings 10–0.
- TB – Ted Hurst 40-yard pass from Baker Mayfield (Chase McLaughlin kick), 6:44. Vikings 10–7. **Drive: 5 plays, 80 yards, 1:59.**

**Second quarter**

- TB – Chase McLaughlin 28-yard field goal, 5:33. Tied 10–10. **Drive: 7 plays, 42 yards, 4:33.**
- MIN – Jordan Addison 41-yard pass from Kyler Murray (Will Reichard kick), 4:11. Vikings 17–10. **Drive: 4 plays, 73 yards, 1:22.**

**Third quarter**

- TB – Chase McLaughlin 38-yard field goal, 7:12. Vikings 17–13. **Drive: 4 plays, 2 yards, 1:23.**

**Fourth quarter**

- TB – Chase McLaughlin 54-yard field goal, 9:02. Vikings 17–16. **Drive: 8 plays, 30 yards, 4:21.**
- MIN – Will Reichard 56-yard field goal, 3:10. Vikings 20–16. **Drive: 11 plays, 17 yards, 5:52.**
- MIN – Will Reichard 43-yard field goal, 0:33. Vikings 23–16. **Drive: 5 plays, 16 yards, 1:06.**

**Top passers**

- MIN – Kyler Murray – 15/29, 168 yards, TD, INT
- TB – Baker Mayfield – 17/34, 217 yards, TD, INT

**Top rushers**

- MIN – Aaron Jones – 17 rushes, 58 yards
- TB – Bucky Irving – 15 rushes, 46 yards

**Top receivers**

- MIN – Jordan Addison – 5 receptions, 90 yards, TD
- TB – Emeka Egbuka – 5 receptions, 62 yards

In a defensive battle, Minnesota beat Tampa Bay 23–16. Minnesota scored an 86-yard punt return touchdown in the first quarter, and led 17–10 at halftime. An 85-yard touchdown pass from Baker Mayfield to Chris Godwin was called back for a penalty in the third quarter, and most drives for both teams came up empty. The two teams combined for 17 punts. Trailing 20–16 with 1:54 to go, Baker Mayfield's desperation pass on 4th & 13 was intercepted. Mayfield suffered a dislocated thumb on the play, and left the game.

With the loss, the Buccaneers dropped to 0–3 for the first time since 2014.

==== Week 4: vs. Green Bay Packers ====
Week 4: Green Bay Packers at Tampa Bay Buccaneers – Game summary

Quarter	1	2	3	4	Total
**Packers**	0	10	7	0	**17**
Buccaneers	0	7	0	7	**14**

at Raymond James Stadium, Tampa, Florida

- Date: October 4
- Game time: 1:00 p.m. EDT
- Game weather: Cloudy, 86 °F (30 °C)
- Game attendance: 61,467
- Referee: Alex Kemp
- TV announcers (Fox): Chris Myers, Jonathan Vilma and Jen Hale
- Recap, Game Book

Game information

**First quarter**

- No scoring plays

**Second quarter**

- GB – Matthew Golden 2-yard pass from Jordan Love (Trey Smack kick), 12:54. Packers 7–0. **Drive: 16 plays, 68 yards, 9:16.**
- TB – Sean Tucker 2-yard run (Chase McLaughlin kick), 5:13. Tied 7–7. **Drive: 9 plays, 54 yards, 5:14.**
- GB – Trey Smack 58-yard field goal, 0:00. Packers 10–7. **Drive: 3 plays, 4 yards, 0:34.**

**Third quarter**

- GB – Tucker Kraft 2-yard pass from Jordan Love (Trey Smack kick), 10:32. Packers 17–7. **Drive: 8 plays, 80 yards, 4:28**

**Fourth quarter**

- TB – Kenneth Gainwell 10-yard pass from Jalon Daniels (Chase McLaughlin kick), 14:49. Packers 17–14. **Drive: 12 plays, 84 yards, 6:28.**

**Top passers**

- GB – Jordan Love – 22/30, 197 yards, 2 TD, INT
- TB – Jalon Daniels – 19/27, 148 yards, TD, 2 INT

**Top rushers**

- GB – Kaleb Johnson – 8 rushes, 42 yards
- TB – Bucky Irving – 16 rushes, 61 yards

**Top receivers**

- GB – Christian Watson – 3 receptions, 47 yards
- TB – Cade Otton – 4 receptions, 37 yards

Rookie Jalon Daniels started at quarterback for the injured Baker Mayfield. Daniels threw a touchdown pass in his debut, but also threw two interceptions. Trailing 17–14 in the fourth quarter, the Buccaneers defense twice forced Green Bay turnovers, but neither time could the offense capitalize.

With the loss, the Buccaneers fell to 0–4, their first such start since 2013.

==== Week 5: at Dallas Cowboys ====
Week 5: Tampa Bay Buccaneers at Dallas Cowboys – Game summary

Quarter	1	2	3	4	Total
**Buccaneers**	0	7	17	0	**24**
Cowboys	7	3	0	6	**16**

at AT&T Stadium, Arlington, Texas

- Date: October 8
- Game time: 8:15 p.m. EDT/7:15 p.m. CDT
- Game weather: None (retractable roof closed)
- Game attendance: 92,351
- Referee: Alex Moore
- TV announcers (WTVT/Prime Video): Al Michaels, Kirk Herbstreit and Kaylee Hartung
- Recap, Game Book

Game information

**First quarter**

- DAL – Javonte Williams 1-yard run (Brandon Aubrey kick), 10:51. Cowboys 7–0. **Drive: 9 plays, 70 yards, 4:09.**

**Second quarter**

- TB – Bucky Irving 5-yard pass from Jalon Daniels (Chase McLaughlin kick), 14:53. Tied 7–7. **Drive: 15 plays, 73 yards, 10:58.**
- DAL – Brandon Aubrey 41-yard field goal, 0:21. Cowboys 10–7. **Drive: 6 plays, 64 yards, 1:31.**

**Third quarter**

- TB – Emeka Egbuka 14-yard run (Chase McLaughlin kick), 14:00. Buccaneers 14–10. **Drive: 2 plays, 86 yards, 1:00.**
- TB – Bucky Irving 1-yard run (Chase McLaughlin kick), 7:31. Buccaneers 21–10. **Drive: 5 plays, 75 yards, 3:12.**
- TB – Chase McLaughlin 41-yard field goal, 2:58. Buccaneers 24–10. **Drive: 8 plays, 14 yards, 4:26.**

**Fourth quarter**

- DAL – George Pickens 18-yard pass from Dak Prescott (pass failed), 5:26. Buccaneers 24–16. **Drive: 10 plays, 99 yards, 3:06.**

**Top passers**

- TB – Jalon Daniels – 19/25, 189 yards, TD
- DAL – Dak Prescott – 24/42, 316 yards, TD, 2 INT

**Top rushers**

- TB – Bucky Irving – 21 rushes, 165 yards, TD
- DAL – Javonte Williams – 12 rushes, 45 yards, TD

**Top receivers**

- TB – Tez Johnson – 1 reception, 64 yards
- DAL – George Pickens – 9 receptions, 130 yards, TD

Tampa Bay secured their first victory of the season with an upset win over Dallas on Thursday night. Jalon Daniels made his second start at quarterback, subbing for the injured Baker Mayfield. Daniels threw for 189 yards including a touchdown. Running back Bucky Irving was a constant scourge for the Dallas defense, with 165 yards on 21 carries, including a 72-yard run on the first play of the second half. Irving led the team with two touchdowns – one rushing, one receiving.

At the start of the first quarter, Dak Prescott drove the Cowboys 70 yards on 9 plays to give Dallas an early 7–0 lead. But Daniels answered with a lengthy 15-play, 73-yard scoring drive, consuming 10:58 off of the clock. Tampa Bay tied the game at 7–7. The Buccaneers defense kept Prescott and the Dallas offense mostly in check, and the score was 10–7 in favor of Dallas at halftime.

After Irving's explosive run to start the third quarter, Emeka Egbuka capped off the drive with a 14-yard End-around touchdown run, and a 14–10 Tampa Bay lead. YaYa Diaby then picked off a deflected pass from Dak Prescott, the first turnover of the game. Daniels found a wide open Tez Johnson in busted coverage for a 64-yard gain. Two plays later Irving was in the endzone for his second touchdown of the night, and a 21–10 lead. KaVontae Turpin fumbled away the ensuing kickoff, which led to a Tampa Bay field goal, and the Buccaneers stretched their lead to 24–10.

Midway through the fourth quarter, Tampa Bay was driving deep into Dallas territory. Facing a 4th & goal at the 1-yard line, Tampa Bay elected to go for it rather than kick the short goal. Sean Tucker was stopped short of the goal line, and Dallas took over on downs. Prescott swiftly drove the Cowboys 99 yards for a touchdown and trimmed the deficit to 24–16 with 5:26 left in regulation. The Cowboys then attempted to score a 2-point conversion, but failed. Dallas later got the ball back one last time, but at the Tampa Bay 24-yard line, Prescott's pass was deflected and intercepted by Alex Anzalone – Prescott's second interception of the night. Irving took two handoffs, got a 22-yard run for a first down, and sealed the victory.

With the win, the Buccaneers ended a four-game losing streak and improved to 1–4.

==== Week 6: vs. Pittsburgh Steelers ====
Week 6: Pittsburgh Steelers at Tampa Bay Buccaneers – Game summary

Quarter	1	2	3	4	OT	Total
**Steelers**	0	3	0	16	7	**26**
Buccaneers	3	10	3	3	0	**19**

at Raymond James Stadium, Tampa, Florida

- Date: October 18
- Game time: 1:00 p.m. EDT
- Game weather: Clear, 77 °F (25 °C)
- Game attendance: 64,660
- Referee: Land Clark
- TV announcers (CBS): Andrew Catalon, Logan Ryan and AJ Ross
- Recap, Game Book

Game information

**First quarter**

- TB – Chase McLaughlin 43-yard field goal, 7:51. Buccaneers 3–0. **Drive: 6 plays, 14 yards, 2:54.**

**Second quarter**

- TB – Emeka Egbuka 2-yard pass from Jalon Daniels (Chase McLaughlin kick), 14:52. Buccaneers 10–0. **Drive: 8 plays 60 yards, 3:49.**
- TB – Chase McLaughlin 47-yard field goal, 4:08. Buccaneers 13–0. **Drive: 7 plays, 33 yards, 3:03.**
- PIT – Chris Boswell 52-yard field goal, 0:00. Buccaneers 13–3. **Drive: 9 plays, 43 yards, 1:28.**

**Third quarter**

- TB – Chase McLaughlin 33-yard field goal, 5:02. Buccaneers 16–3. **Drive: 17 plays, 70 yards, 9:02.**

**Fourth quarter**

- PIT – Darnell Washington 5-yard pass from Aaron Rodgers (Chris Boswell kick), 13:48. Buccaneers 16–10. **Drive: 8 plays 68 yards, 3:26.**
- PIT – Chris Boswell 39-yard field goal, 8:08. Buccaneers 16–13. **Drive: 8 plays, 24 yards, 5:01.**
- PIT – Chris Boswell 58-yard field goal, 1:55. Tied 16–16. **Drive: 9 plays, 37 yards, 5:08.**
- PIT – Chris Boswell 2-yard field goal, 1:21. Steelers 19–16. **Drive: 4 plays, 2 yards, 0:17.**
- TB – Chase McLauglin 53-yard field goal, 0:08. 'Tied 19–19. **Drive: 5 plays, 30 yards, 1:13.**

**Overtime**

- PIT – Germie Bernard 6-yard pass from Aaron Rodgers (Chris Boswell kick), 3:15. 'Steelers 26–19. **Drive: 12 plays, 70 yards, 6:45.**

**Top passers**

- PIT – Aaron Rodgers – 33/49, 253 yards, 2 TD, INT
- TB – Jalon Daniels – 22/43, 164 yards, TD, 2 INT

**Top rushers**

- PIT – Jaylen Warren – 14 rushes, 50 yards
- TB – Bucky Irving – 19 rushes, 46 yards

**Top receivers**

- PIT – DK Metcalf – 11 receptions, 93 yards
- TB – Emeka Egbuka – 7 receptions, 48 yards, TD

Tampa Bay built a 16–3 lead through three quarters, behind a strong defensive performance early on. But in the fourth quarter, two interceptions by quarterback Jalon Daniels, and breakdowns on defense, allowed the Steelers to claw their way back. The game went to overtime tied 19–19. Aaron Rodgers drove the Steelers 70 yards in 12 plays, to take a 26–19 lead. Tampa Bay's offense stalled on the ensuing drive, and the game ended on a Daniels sack facing 4th & 8 at the 48 yard line.

With the loss, the Buccaneers fell to 1–5.

==== Week 7: at Carolina Panthers ====
Week 7: Tampa Bay Buccaneers at Carolina Panthers – Game summary

Quarter	1	2	3	4	Total
**Buccaneers**	7	26	3	7	**43**
Panthers	0	6	0	7	**13**

at Bank of America Stadium, Charlotte, North Carolina

- Date: October 25
- Game time: 1:00 p.m. EDT
- Game weather: Sunny, 66 °F (19 °C)
- Game attendance: 73,195
- Referee: Carl Cheffers
- TV announcers (Fox): Kevin Kugler, Daryl Johnston and Allison Williams
- Recap, Game Book

Game information

**First quarter**

- TB – Bucky Irving 4-yard run (Chase McLaughlin kick), 7:22. Buccaneers 7–0. **Drive: 14 plays, 70 yards, 7:48.**

**Second quarter**

- TB – Chase McLaughlin 22-yard field goal, 14:12. Buccaneers 10–0. **Drive: 5 plays, 14 yards, 1:35.**
- TB – Calijah Kancey 32-yard fumble return (Chase McLaughlin kick), 11:05. Buccaneers 17–0. **Drive: 5 plays, 1 yard, 3:07.**
- CAR – Darren Waller 50-yard pass from Bryce Young (kick failed, returned for two-point conversion), 9:09. Buccaneers 19–6. **Drive: 5 plays, 72 yards, 1:56.**
- TB – Bucky Irving 1-yard run (Chase McLaughlin kick), 3:53. Buccaneers 26–6. **Drive: 8 plays, 59 yards, 5:16.**
- TB – Tez Johnson 14-yard pass from Baker Mayfield (Chase McLaughlin kick), 0:04. Buccaneers 33–6. **Drive: 8 plays, 32 yards, 2:26.**

**Third quarter**

- TB – Chase McLaughlin 44-yard field goal, 6:30. Buccaneers 36–6. **Drive: 4 plays, 6 yards, 2:29.**

**Fourth quarter**

- TB – Sean Tucker 46-yard run (Chase McLaughlin kick), 10:21. Buccaneers 43–6. **Drive: 9 plays, 94 yards, 6:29.**
- CAR – Anthony Tyus III 12-yard run (Ryan Fitzgerald kick), 5:28. Buccaneers 43–13. **Drive: 8 plays, 71 yards, 4:53.**

**Top passers**

- TB – Baker Mayfield – 7/11, 64 yards, TD
- CAR – Bryce Young – 14/27, 163 yards, TD, 2 INT

**Top rushers**

- TB – Bucky Irving – 24 rushes, 106 yards, 2 TD
- CAR – Chuba Hubbard – 7 rushes, 33 yards

**Top receivers**

- TB – Tez Johnson – 2 receptions, 33 yards, TD
- CAR – Darren Waller – 1 reception, 50 yards, TD

Tampa Bay defeated rival Carolina 43–13, in a dominating performance. Bucky Irving rushed for 106 yards on 24 carries, with two touchdowns. The Buccaneers defense sacked Bryce Young five times, and Young threw two interceptions. Calijah Kancey got a "scoop-and-score" touchdown, and later the Tampa Bay special teams blocked an extra point try, and returned it for a defensive two-point conversion. Quarterback Baker Mayfield returned the starting lineup after having missing three games due to a dislocated thumb. With the Tampa Bay offense putting up 258 total yards on the ground, Mayfield made only 11 pass attempts for 64 yards and one touchdown – his 200th career touchdown pass.

The Buccaneers became the second team in NFL history to score a field goal and rushing, passing, defensive, and special teams touchdowns in a single quarter after the 2018 Jets. It was Tampa Bay's 11th victory in the last 13 meetings against Carolina, and pulled the all-time series between the two teams even at 26–26. With the win, the Buccaneers improved to 2–5 on the season.

==== Week 8: vs. Atlanta Falcons ====
Week 8: Atlanta Falcons at Tampa Bay Buccaneers – Game summary

Quarter	1	2	3	4	Total
Falcons	0	0	0	0	**0**
**Buccaneers**	6	3	7	0	**16**

at Raymond James Stadium, Tampa, Florida

- Date: November 1
- Game time: 1:00 p.m. EST
- Game weather: Rain, 78 °F (26 °C)
- Game attendance: 61,036
- Referee: Alan Eck
- TV announcers (Fox): Mark Followill, Daryl Johnston, and Allison Williams
- Recap, Game Book

Game information

**First quarter**

- TB – Chase McLaughlin 46-yard field goal, 7:43. Buccaneers 3–0. **Drive: 5 plays, 29 yards, 2:12.**
- TB – Chase McLaughlin 34-yard field goal, 4:02. Buccaneers 6–0. **Drive: 4 plays, 3 yards, 1:34.**

**Second quarter**

- TB – Chase McLaughlin 42-yard field goal, 4:04. Buccaneers 9–0. **Drive: 13 plays, 60 yards, 8:29.**

**Third quarter**

- TB – Bucky Irving 4-yard run (Chase McLaughlin kick), 3:47. Buccaneers 16–0. **Drive: 6 plays, 90 yards, 3:22.**

**Fourth quarter**

- No scoring plays

**Top passers**

- ATL – Michael Penix Jr. – 8/24, 125 yards, 4 INT
- TB – Baker Mayfield – 0/3, 0 yards

**Top rushers**

- ATL – Bijan Robinson – 19 rushes, 76 yards
- TB – Bucky Irving – 27 rushes, 170 yards, TD

**Top receivers**

- ATL – Jahan Dotson – 2 receptions, 95 yards
- TB – None

Heavy rain made for sloppy, wet, and difficult conditions. Quarterback Baker Mayfield made only three pass attempts, and failed to complete a single pass. The Buccaneers became the second team in the Super Bowl era, and first team since the 1974 Buffalo Bills to finish (and win) a game without completing a pass. In addition, they are the first team since 1945 to have zero pass completions and win the game by 10 or more points.

The game was dominated by Tampa Bay's rushing attack and the Tampa Bay defense. Running backs Bucky Irving and Kenneth Gainwell both rushed for over 100 yards each, as the Buccaneers put up a franchise record 324 yards on the ground. It was the first time Tampa Bay had two 100-yard rushers since Mike Alstott and Warrick Dunn accomplished the feat in 1998. The Tampa Bay defense intercepted Michael Penix Jr. four times, and shut out the Falcons for the first time since 2004. With the win, Tampa Bay improved to 3–5.

==== Week 9: at Chicago Bears ====
Week 9: Tampa Bay Buccaneers at Chicago Bears – Game summary

Quarter	1	2	3	4	Total
Buccaneers	0	6	7	11	**24**
**Bears**	14	3	7	3	**27**

at Soldier Field, Chicago, Illinois

- Date: November 8
- Game time: 8:20 p.m. EST/7:20 p.m. CST
- Game weather: Clear, 53 °F (12 °C)
- Game attendance: 60,470
- Referee: Ronald Torbert
- TV announcers (NBC): Noah Eagle, Cris Collinsworth and Melissa Stark
- Recap, Game Book

Game information

**First quarter**

- CHI – Rome Odunze 9-yard pass from Caleb Williams (Cairo Santos kick), 9:38. Bears 7–0. **Drive: 10 plays, 53 yards, 5:22.**
- CHI – Luther Burden III 56-yard pass from Caleb Williams (Cairo Santos kick), 6:00. Bears 14–0. **Drive: 4 plays, 81 yards, 1:24.**

**Second quarter**

- TB – Chase McLaughlin 27-yard field goal, 13:48. Bears 14–3. **Drive: 13 plays, 67 yards, 7:12.**
- CHI – Cairo Santos 25-yard field goal, 3:02. Bears 17–3. **Drive: 6 plays, 45 yards, 2:16.**
- TB – Chase McLaughlin 21-yard field goal, 0:00. Bears 17–6. **Drive: 5 plays, 40 yards, 0:38.**

**Third quarter**

- TB – Bucky Irving 2-yard run (Chase McLaughlin kick), 11:37. Bears 17–13. **Drive: 6 plays, 74 yards, 3:23.**
- CHI – Jaylon Johnson 67-yard interception return (Cairo Santos kick), 3:39. Bears 24–13.

**Fourth quarter**

- TB – Chase McLaughlin 35-yard field goal, 11:24. Bears 24–16. **Drive: 8 plays, 48 yards, 4:00.**
- TB – Bucky Irving 6-yard run (Baker Mayfield run), 2:51. Tied 24–24. **Drive: 2 plays, 17 yards, 0:47.**
- CHI – Cairo Santos 38-yard field goal, 0:00. Bears 27–24. **Drive: 8 plays, 49 yards, 2:51.**

**Top passers**

- TB – Baker Mayfield – 18/32, 243 yards, 2 INT
- CHI – Caleb Williams – 22/37, 279 yards, 2 TD, 4 INT

**Top rushers**

- TB – Bucky Irving – 20 rushes, 97 yards, 2 TD
- CHI – D'Andre Swift – 12 rushes, 31 yards

**Top receivers**

- TB – Tez Johnson – 2 receptions, 76 yards
- CHI – Luther Burden III – 7 receptions, 97 yards, TD

Tampa Bay visited Chicago on Sunday Night Football. Mike Tirico was originally supposed to call this game, but Noah Eagle substituted for him due to a health issue. The Buccaneers defense forced five turnovers, but the Bears escaped with a 27–24 victory.

Trailing 24–16 with 3:48 to go, Tampa Bay forced a fumble by Luther Burden III, and recovered the ball at the Chicago 15 yard line. Two plays later, Bucky Irving was in the endzone for a touchdown. On the two point conversion attempt, quarterback Baker Mayfield scrambled in a big hole up the middle, and tied the score at 24–24 with 2:51 left in regulation. Chicago then drove down to the Tampa Bay 20, and Cairo Santos kicked the game-winning field goal as time expired.

==== Week 11: at Detroit Lions ====
Week 11: Tampa Bay Buccaneers at Detroit Lions – Game summary

Quarter	1	2	3	4	Total
Buccaneers	0	7	7	7	**21**
**Lions**	0	10	7	14	**31**

at Ford Field, Detroit, Michigan

- Date: November 22
- Game time: 1:00 p.m. EST
- Game weather: None (indoor stadium)
- Game attendance: 64,024
- Referee: Adrian Hill
- TV announcers (Fox): Kevin Kugler, Daryl Johnston and Allison Williams
- Recap, Game Book

Game information

**First quarter**

- No scoring plays

**Second quarter**

- DET – Amon-Ra St. Brown 14-yard pass from Jared Goff (Jake Bates kick), 10:37. Lions 7–0. **Drive: 14 plays, 90 yards, 7:22.**
- DET – Jake Bates 36-yard field goal, 1:48. Lions 10–0. **Drive: 7 plays, 48 yards, 3:38.**
- TB – Ted Hurst 23-yard pass from Baker Mayfield (Chase McLaughlin kick), 0:04. Lions 10–7. **Drive: 9 plays, 65 yards, 1:44.**

**Third quarter**

- DET – Jameson Williams 57-yard pass from Jared Goff (Jake Bates kick), 9:01. Lions 17–7. **Drive: 6 plays, 83 yards, 2:55.**
- TB – Bucky Irving 1-yard rush (Chase McLaughlin kick), 2:41. Lions 17–14. **Drive: 12 plays, 70 yards, 6:20.**

**Fourth quarter**

- DET – Jahmyr Gibbs 1-yard rush (Jake Bates kick), 5:24. Lions 24–14. **Drive: 9 plays, 59 yards, 4:52.**
- DET – Jahmyr Gibbs 4-yard rush (Jake Bates kick), 1:55. Lions 31–14. **Drive: 6 plays, 34 yards, 1:21.**
- TB – Ted Hurst 4-yard pass from Baker Mayfield (Chase McLaughlin kick), 0:08. Lions 31–21. **Drive: 7 plays, 65 yards, 1:47.**

**Top passers**

- TB – Baker Mayfield – 20/33, 187 yards, 2 TD
- DET – Jared Goff – 20/28, 279 yards, 2 TD

**Top rushers**

- TB – Bucky Irving – 18 rushes, 68 yards, TD
- DET – Jahmyr Gibbs – 23 rushes, 98 yards, 2 TD

**Top receivers**

- TB – Ted Hurst – 5 reception, 56 yards, 2 TD
- DET – Jameson Williams – 4 receptions, 93 yards, TD

==== Week 12: vs. Carolina Panthers ====
Week 12: Carolina Panthers at Tampa Bay Buccaneers – Game summary

Quarter	1	2	3	4	Total
Panthers	0	0	0	0	**0**
Buccaneers	0	0	0	0	**0**

at Raymond James Stadium, Tampa, Florida

- Date: November 30
- Game time: 8:15 p.m. EST
- TV announcers (ESPN): Joe Buck, Troy Aikman and Lisa Salters
- Preview

=== Standings ===
==== Division ====
NFC South
	W	L	T	PCT	DIV	CONF	PF	PA	STK
Carolina Panthers	5	5	0	.500	2–1	4–3	254	269	W2
Tampa Bay Buccaneers	3	7	0	.300	2–0	3–4	223	209	L2
Atlanta Falcons	3	7	0	.300	1–2	3–3	201	258	L3
New Orleans Saints	3	7	0	.300	0–2	1–5	215	257	L2

==== Conference ====
NFC
Seed	Team	Division	W	L	T	PCT	DIV	CONF	SOS	SOV	STK
**Division leaders**
1	San Francisco 49ers	West	8	1	0	.889	3–0	5–1	.428	.444	W2
2 (Note: Detroit wins tie break over Chicago based on division record.)	Detroit Lions	North	8	2	0	.800	2–0	5–1	.440	.375	W6
3	New York Giants	East	5	3	1	.611	2–1–1	3–3–1	.356	.308	L1
4	Carolina Panthers	South	5	5	0	.500	2–1	4–3	.510	.412	W2
**Wild cards**
5	Chicago Bears	North	8	2	0	.800	0–2	6–2	.434	.375	W5
6	Minnesota Vikings	North	7	2	0	.778	3–1	5–1	.516	.423	W1
7 (Note: Green Bay wins tie break over Seattle based on conference record. Division tie break was initially used to eliminate LA Rams (see below).)	Green Bay Packers	North	6	4	0	.600	1–3	4–4	.535	.459	L1
**In the hunt**
8 (Note: Seattle wins tie break over LA Rams based on division record.)	Seattle Seahawks	West	6	4	0	.600	2–1	2–3	.515	.393	W2
9	Los Angeles Rams	West	6	4	0	.600	1–2	4–2	.485	.345	W4
10	Dallas Cowboys	East	5	6	0	.455	2–1	2–5	.400	.290	W1
11	Washington Commanders	East	3	5	1	.389	2–2–1	3–4–1	.506	.500	W1
12 (Note: Tampa Bay wins tie break over Philadelphia based on conference record. Division tie break was initially used to eliminate Atlanta and New Orleans (see below).) (Note: Tampa Bay wins tie break over Atlanta and New Orleans based on head-to-head record.)	Tampa Bay Buccaneers	South	3	7	0	.300	2–0	3–4	.616	.419	L2
13 (Note: Atlanta wins tie break over Philadephia based on conference record. Division tie break was initially used to eliminate New Orleans (see below).) (Note: Atlanta wins tie break over New Orleans based on head-to-head victory.)	Atlanta Falcons	South	3	7	0	.300	1–2	3–3	.586	.586	L3
14 (Note: New Orleans wins tie break over Philadelphia based on conference record.)	New Orleans Saints	South	3	7	0	.300	0–2	1–5	.571	.517	L2
15	Philadelphia Eagles	East	3	7	0	.300	1–3	1–6	.521	.362	W1
16	Arizona Cardinals	West	3	8	0	.273	1–4	2–6	.621	.400	L3
