= Joe Shimko =

American football player (born 2000)

Profile
- Position: Long snapper

Personal information
- Born: September 30, 2000 (age 26); Belmar, New Jersey, U.S.
- Listed height: 6 ft 0 in (1.83 m)
- Listed weight: 230 lb (104 kg)

Career information
- High school: Wall (NJ)
- College: NC State (2019–2023)
- NFL draft: 2024: undrafted

Career history
- Arizona Cardinals (2024)*
- * Offseason or practice squad member only

Awards and highlights
- Patrick Mannelly Award (2023); First-team All-American (2023); Second-team All-American (2022)

Joe Shimko (born September 30, 2000) is an American professional football long snapper. He played college football at NC State.

== Early life ==
Shimko was born in Belmar, New Jersey. He played baseball and ran track, but only began football prior to his sophomore year at Wall High School. Shimko sustained injuries playing running back and linebacker and questioned how long he would last playing the sport; his father then convinced him to try out long snapper, a position at which it is more common for players to have long careers. He attended camps held by Chris Rubio but at an event in Las Vegas, was ranked only 80th out of 100 entrants for the Class of 2018.

In the summer prior to his junior year, Shimko would long snap to his father 400 times each day (200 for each field goals and punts). He quickly rose in Rubio's long snapping rankings and became the varsity starter that season at Wall. As a senior, he posted 13 tackles, was named All-Division and played in the All-American Bowl. Ranked a five-star recruit, the seventh-best long snapper by Rubio's camp and the fifth-best by 247Sports, he committed to play college football for the NC State Wolfpack.

== College career ==
Shimko became a starter at NC State as a true freshman in 2019, serving as the long snapper for all 108 of the team's kicks. He then recorded 114 snaps in the 2020 season. In 2021, Shimko was named a fourth-team All-American by Phil Steele. The following year, he was a second-team All-American selection by the American Football Coaches Association (AFCA) and was a semifinalist for the Patrick Mannelly Award, given to the best long snapper nationally. In 2023, he won the Patrick Mannelly Award; in his career, 61 games, he never made a bad snap.

== Professional career ==
Shimko signed with the Arizona Cardinals as an undrafted free agent on April 29, 2024. On August 20, 2024, Shimko was released by the Cardinals.

== Personal life ==
Off the field, Shimko has been active in charitable organizations, having helped raise hundreds of thousands of dollars for different groups.
