= Rocco Underwood =

American football player (born 2002)

No. 41 – Philadelphia Eagles
- Position: Long snapper
- Roster status: Active

Personal information
- Born: August 14, 2002 (age 24); Lake Mary, Florida, U.S.
- Listed height: 6 ft 3 in (1.91 m)
- Listed weight: 240 lb (109 kg)

Career information
- High school: Lake Mary (Lake Mary, Florida)
- College: Florida (2021–2025)
- NFL draft: 2026: undrafted

Career history
- Philadelphia Eagles (2026–present)

Awards and highlights
- Patrick Mannelly Award (2024); Second-team All-SEC (2024)

Career NFL statistics as of Week 9, 2026
- Games played: 9
- Total tackles: 3
- Fumble recoveries: 1
- Stats at Pro Football Reference

Jonathan Rocco Underwood (born August 14, 2002) is an American professional football long snapper for the Philadelphia Eagles of the National Football League (NFL). He played college football for the Florida Gators which he won the 2024 Patrick Mannelly Award as the top long snapper in college football.

== Early life ==
Underwood is from Lake Mary, Florida. His father, David, was an All-American offensive guard for UCF; his brother, David Jr., played high school football; and Underwood is a cousin to National Football League (NFL) punters Tommy and Johnny Townsend, both of whom played college football for the Florida Gators. Underwood attended Lake Mary High School where he played football and basketball.

At Lake Mary, Underwood was used as a wide receiver, tight end and long snapper. He had 44 receptions for 848 yards and 10 touchdowns as a junior and then caught 23 passes for 347 yards and five touchdowns as a senior. He was mainly recruited to play college football as a long snapper, receiving a ranking of number one nationally at the position by Rubio Long Snapping. He was ranked a six-star prospect by Rubio and committed to play for the Florida Gators.

== College career ==
Underwood redshirted as a freshman at Florida in 2021, appearing only in their 2021 Gasparilla Bowl game against UCF. In 2022, he appeared in 13 games, recording one tackle and one fumble recovery. The following year, he played in all 12 games and made a total of one tackle. As a junior in 2024, Underwood played in 11 of 12 regular season games and tallied three tackles and a fumble recovery, being named second-team All-Southeastern Conference (SEC) and the Patrick Mannelly Award winner as the best long snapper in college football.

== Professional career ==
Pre-draft measurables
Height	Weight	Arm length	Hand span	Wingspan	40-yard dash	10-yard split	20-yard split	20-yard shuttle	Three-cone drill	Vertical jump	Broad jump	Bench press
6 ft 3 1/4 in (1.91 m)	240 lb (109 kg)	32 1/2 in (0.83 m)	9 1/2 in (0.24 m)	6 ft 6 in (1.98 m)	4.75 s	1.63 s	2.50 s	4.20 s	7.15 s	30.5 in (0.77 m)	9 ft 5 in (2.87 m)	14 reps
All values from Pro Day

After going unselected in the 2026 NFL draft, Underwood signed with the Philadelphia Eagles as an undrafted free agent.
