= Beau Gardner =

American football player (born 2001)

No. 45 – Chicago Bears
- Position: Long snapper
- Roster status: Practice squad

Personal information
- Born: December 26, 2001 (age 24); San Francisco, California, U.S.
- Listed height: 6 ft 5 in (1.96 m)
- Listed weight: 249 lb (113 kg)

Career information
- High school: St. Ignatius (San Francisco)
- College: UCLA (2020–2023); Georgia (2024–2025)
- NFL draft: 2026: undrafted

Career history
- Chicago Bears (2026–present)

Awards and highlights
- Patrick Mannelly Award (2025); First-team All-American (2025); 2× First-team All-SEC (2024, 2025)

Career NFL statistics as of Week 2, 2026
- Games played: 2
- Tackles: 1
- Stats at Pro Football Reference

Beggs Barnum Gardner (born December 26, 2001) is an American professional football long snapper for the Chicago Bears of the National Football League (NFL). He played college football for the UCLA Bruins and the Georgia Bulldogs, winning the 2025 Patrick Mannelly Award as the nation's top long snapper in college football. Gardner was signed as an undrafted free agent by the Chicago Bears in 2026, playing the first two games.

== Early life ==
Beau Gardner was born on December 26, 2001, and raised in San Francisco, California, where he attended the local St. Ignatius College Preparatory and played football. Gardner played as a center his freshman and sophomore years of high school and moved to tackle his junior and senior years. He only started playing as a long snapper later in his high school career, when he attended the Chris Rubio Long Snapping camp. In his junior year, Gardner was named to the first-team West Catholic Athletic League team. Gardner was then named to the third-team All-Bay Area Preps HQ team by The Mercury News in his senior year. After his senior year, Gardner committed to play football as a walk-on at UCLA over USC and California.

== College career ==
The day before his first game in the 2020 season, Gardner broke his foot, causing him to miss the entire season due to surgery. Gardner then redshirted the following year, and did not play in any games. In 2022, Gardner played his first game, appearing in three during the season. Gardner became the starting long snapper the following year, starting all thirteen games for UCLA in 2023.

Before 2024, Gardner announced he would transfer to the University of Georgia, where he would continue playing football. Before the season started, Gardner was named to the Patrick Mannelly Award watch list. Gardner finished as a finalist for the award in 2024. Additionally, Gardner was named to the first-team All-SEC team. Coming into 2025, Gardner was again named to the watchlist for the Patrick Mannelly Award. By the end of the season, Gardner was named a first-team All-SEC player again, along with being named a first-team All-American by the AFCA. Additionally, Gardner was announced as the winner of the 2025 Patrick Mannelly Award.

== Professional career ==
Pre-draft measurables
Height	Weight	Arm length	Hand span	Wingspan	40-yard dash	10-yard split	20-yard split	Bench press
6 ft 5 1/8 in (1.96 m)	249 lb (113 kg)	32 1/8 in (0.82 m)	9 1/8 in (0.23 m)	6 ft 5 7/8 in (1.98 m)	5.08 s	1.78 s	2.90 s	12 reps
All values from Pro Day

At the conclusion of the 2026 NFL draft, Gardner signed with the Chicago Bears as an undrafted free agent. During training camp, Gardner won the competition against Luke Elkin to be the Bears' long snapper for the 2026 season. He succeeded Scott Daly as the team's starter; while Daly had more experience, the Bears felt Gardner was better in blocking and coverage.

Gardner recorded a tackle on 11 plays in his NFL debut versus the Carolina Panthers. However, he also had a high snap in the game, a concern that continued the following week. In Week 2 against the Minnesota Vikings, Gardner snapped the ball too high on a 50-yard field goal that was nearly blocked by the defense. Hoping to avoid a repeat on a 23-yard attempt in the fourth quarter, the Bears changed the snap count but the team was unprepared for the new cadence; Gardner's ensuing snap was high while his teammates were slow to react, causing the kick to be blocked. Head coach Ben Johnson criticized the second kick, saying "the operation was not clean. The snap was not good." Gardner was waived on September 22 and replaced by Daly. On September 24, he was re-signed to the practice squad.
