= Josiah Trotter =

American football player (born 2005)

No. 45 – Tampa Bay Buccaneers
- Position: Linebacker
- Roster status: Active

Personal information
- Born: April 15, 2005 (age 21); Hainesport Township, New Jersey, U.S.
- Listed height: 6 ft 2 in (1.88 m)
- Listed weight: 237 lb (108 kg)

Career information
- High school: St. Joseph's Prep (Philadelphia, Pennsylvania)
- College: West Virginia (2023–2024); Missouri (2025)
- NFL draft: 2026: 2nd round, 46th overall pick

Career history
- Tampa Bay Buccaneers (2026–present)

Awards and highlights
- First-team All-SEC (2025); Big 12 Defensive Freshman of the Year (2024)

Career NFL statistics as of Week 9, 2026
- Total tackles: 76
- Sacks: 1.0
- Pass deflections: 3
- Interceptions: 1
- Defensive touchdowns: 1
- Stats at Pro Football Reference

Josiah Trotter (born April 15, 2005) is an American professional football linebacker for the Tampa Bay Buccaneers of the National Football League (NFL). He previously played college football for the West Virginia Mountaineers and the Missouri Tigers and was selected by the Buccaneers in the second round of the 2026 NFL draft.

== Early life ==
Trotter attended St. Joseph's Preparatory School in Philadelphia, Pennsylvania, where he was a standout in football. He earned an invite to the All-American Bowl in San Antonio, Texas. Trotter was rated as a four-star recruit and held offers from schools such as Clemson, Notre Dame, Ohio State, Oregon, Penn State, South Carolina, Virginia Tech, and West Virginia. Ultimately, Trotter committed to play college football for the West Virginia Mountaineers.

== College career ==
=== West Virginia ===
Trotter took a redshirt in 2023 due to a knee injury. In week 6 of the 2024 season, he recorded his first career interception off of quarterback Alan Bowman in a win over Oklahoma State. In week eight, Trotter notched four tackles in a win over Arizona. He appeared in 12 games in 2024, notching 92 tackles with four being for a loss, half a sack, three pass deflections, and an interception. Trotter was named a semifinalist for the Shaun Alexander Freshman of the Year Award, as well as being named the Big 12 Conference Defensive Freshman of the Year. After the season, Trotter entered his name into the NCAA transfer portal.

=== Missouri ===
On December 16, 2024, Trotter announced that he would transfer to Missouri.

== Professional career ==
Pre-draft measurables
Height	Weight	Arm length	Hand span	Wingspan	Bench press
6 ft 1 7/8 in (1.88 m)	237 lb (108 kg)	32 1/4 in (0.82 m)	10 1/4 in (0.26 m)	6 ft 5 3/8 in (1.97 m)	27 reps
All values from NFL Combine

Trotter was selected by the Tampa Bay Buccaneers in the second round as the 46th overall pick in the 2026 NFL draft.

In his NFL debut, he registered 11 total tackles, a sack, a pass deflection, and an interception returned for a touchdown in the 33-27 loss to the Cincinnati Bengals. Despite the loss, he became the first NFL rookie to have a sack and pick-six in their debut as well as the first Tampa Bay player ever to have a pick-six in their NFL debut.

== Career statistics ==
Legend
**Bold**	Career high

=== NFL ===
==== Regular season ====
Year	Team	Games		Tackles						Interceptions				Fumbles			
Year	Team	GP	GS	Cmb	Solo	Ast	Sck	TFL	QBH	Int	Yds	TD	PD	FF	FR	Yds	TD
2026	TAM	8	7	76	37	39	1.0	3	1	1	38	1	3	0	0	0	0
Career		8	7	76	37	39	1.0	3	1	1	38	1	3	0	0	0	0

== Personal life ==
Trotter is the son of former NFL linebacker Jeremiah Trotter, and is the brother of current NFL linebacker Jeremiah Trotter Jr. Trotter's cousin Terrance Ganaway, played in three games for the St. Louis Rams in 2012.
