= Patrick Mannelly Award =

Annual award to best long snapper in US college football

- Awarded for: Best long snapper in college football

History
- First award: 2019
- Most recent: Beau Gardner, Georgia
- Website: patrickmannellyaward.com

The Patrick Mannelly Award is an award given annually in the United States to the best college football long snapper. The award is named after Duke Blue Devils alum and former Chicago Bears long snapper Patrick Mannelly. The award was founded in 2019 by Mannelly, Chris Rubio, and Kevin Gold.

== Winners ==
Year	Player	School	Ref.
2019	John Shannon	Notre Dame	
2020	Thomas Fletcher	Alabama	
2021	Cal Adomitis	Pittsburgh	
2022	Chris Stoll	Penn State	
2023	Joe Shimko	NC State	
2024	Rocco Underwood	Florida	
2025	Beau Gardner	Georgia	
