= Evan Deckers =

American football player (born 1999)

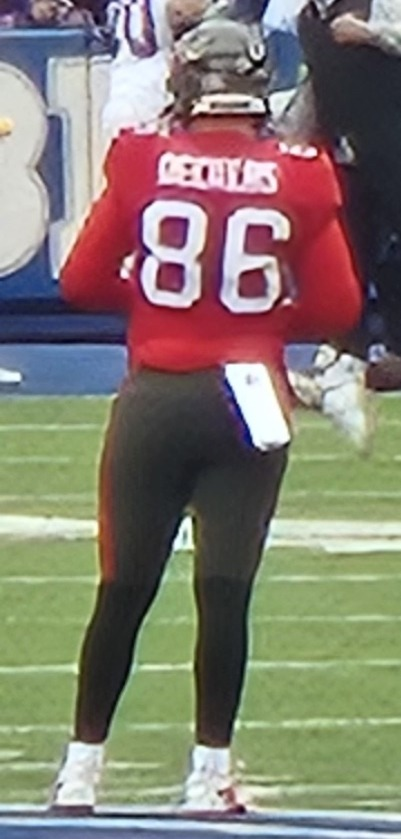
- Deckers with the Tampa Bay Buccaneers in 2025

No. 86 – Tampa Bay Buccaneers
- Position: Long snapper
- Roster status: Active

Personal information
- Born: February 23, 1999 (age 27); Avon, Connecticut, U.S.
- Listed height: 6 ft 3 in (1.91 m)
- Listed weight: 252 lb (114 kg)

Career information
- High school: Avon Old Farms (Avon, Connecticut)
- College: UMass (2018–2021); Duke (2022)
- NFL draft: 2023: undrafted

Career history
- Tampa Bay Buccaneers (2023–present)

Career NFL statistics as of Week 8, 2026
- Games played: 36
- Total tackles: 2
- Stats at Pro Football Reference

Evan Deckers (born February 23, 1999) is an American professional football long snapper for the Tampa Bay Buccaneers of the National Football League (NFL). He played college football for the UMass Minutemen and Duke Blue Devils.

== Early life ==
Deckers was born on February 23, 1999, in Avon, Connecticut. He is the son of Peter Deckers and Tina Deckers. He attended high school at Avon Old Farms, where he won 10 varsity letters, competing in golf, football, basketball, hockey and squash. With the football team, he played as a center, long snapper and quarterback, being ranked a 4.5-star long snapper by Kohl's Kicking. He was ranked a two-star recruit at long snapper by both Rivals.com and 247Sports and signed to play college football for the UMass Minutemen in February 2018.

== College career ==
Deckers was one of the two main long snappers for UMass as a true freshman in 2018, appearing in all 12 games. He played in all 12 games in 2019, recording two tackles, and in all four games during the 2020 season. He was named to the Patrick Mannelly Award watchlist and to Phil Steele's Preseason All-Independent first-team entering the 2021 season, in which he appeared in all 12 games while tallying two tackles. He was named to Phil Steele's All-Independent second team at the end of the season and graduated from UMass in December 2021 with a degree in kinesiology.

Deckers opted to transfer to the Duke Blue Devils for a final season of college football in 2022, ending his stint at UMass having appeared in 40 games. He played in all 13 games for Duke in 2022, helping the team convert 17 of 24 field goal attempts and all 52 extra point attempts. He received a master's degree in management studies from Duke's Fuqua School of Business. In his collegiate career, he played 53 games, helping his teams convert 44 of 60 field goals and 154 of 158 extra points, while being named Academic All-Atlantic Coast Conference (ACC) and to the National Football Foundation (NFF) Hampshire Honors Society in his last season.

== Professional career ==
Pre-draft measurables
Height	Weight	Arm length	Hand span	Wingspan	40-yard dash	10-yard split	20-yard split	20-yard shuttle	Three-cone drill	Vertical jump	Broad jump	Bench press
6 ft 2 7/8 in (1.90 m)	245 lb (111 kg)	31 1/4 in (0.79 m)	9 7/8 in (0.25 m)	6 ft 3 5/8 in (1.92 m)	5.15 s	1.88 s	2.89 s	4.65 s	7.87 s	28.0 in (0.71 m)	8 ft 6 in (2.59 m)	10 reps
All values from Pro Day

After going unselected in the 2023 NFL draft, Deckers signed with the Tampa Bay Buccaneers as an undrafted free agent. He competed with Zach Triner for the team's long snapping job and was waived on August 29, 2023. After Triner was injured, Deckers signed with the Buccaneers practice squad on December 13, 2023. He was released six days later, on December 19, without having appeared in a game. After the season, he signed a reserve/future contract with the Buccaneers on January 30, 2024. He beat out Triner for the team's long snapper job in 2024, but suffered a hamstring injury in Week 3 and was placed on injured reserve. He was activated on November 9.
