= Chase McLaughlin =

American football player (born 1996)

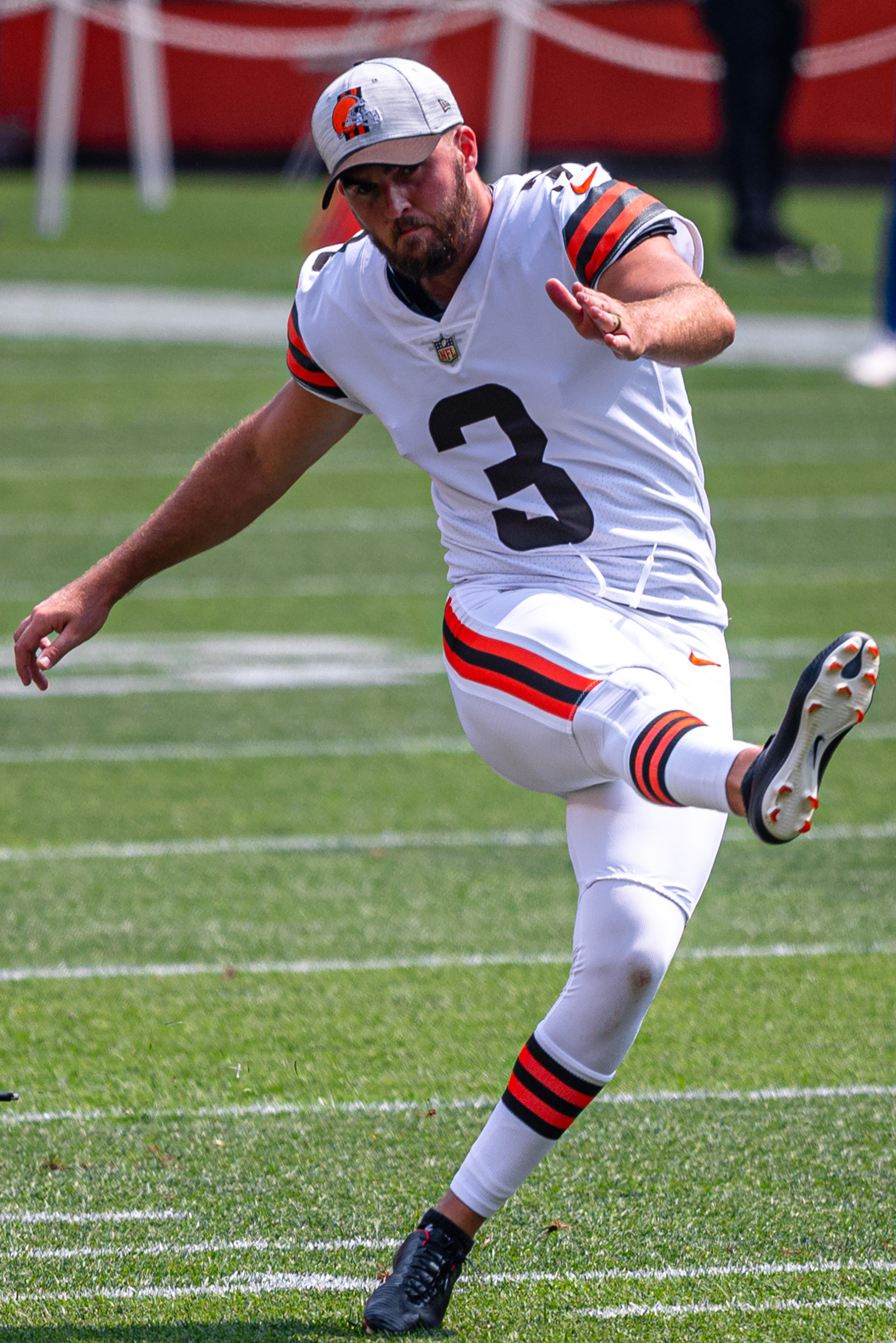
- McLaughlin with the Cleveland Browns in 2021

No. 4 – Tampa Bay Buccaneers
- Position: Placekicker
- Roster status: Active

Personal information
- Born: April 9, 1996 (age 30); Cypress, Texas, U.S.
- Listed height: 6 ft 0 in (1.83 m)
- Listed weight: 190 lb (86 kg)

Career information
- High school: Cypress Woods
- College: Illinois (2014–2018)
- NFL draft: 2019: undrafted

Career history
- Buffalo Bills (2019)*; Minnesota Vikings (2019)*; Los Angeles Chargers (2019); San Francisco 49ers (2019); Indianapolis Colts (2019); Minnesota Vikings (2020)*; Jacksonville Jaguars (2020); New York Jets (2020); Cleveland Browns (2021); Indianapolis Colts (2022); Tampa Bay Buccaneers (2023–present)
- * Offseason or practice squad member only

Awards and highlights
- Big Ten Kicker of the Year (2018); First-team All-Big Ten (2018)

Career NFL statistics as of Week 9, 2026
- Field goals made: 180
- Field goals attempted: 208
- Field goal %: 86.5%
- Extra points made: 225
- Extra points attempted: 230
- Extra point %: 97.8%
- Points: 765
- Longest field goal: 65
- Touchbacks: 108
- Stats at Pro Football Reference

Chase Joseph McLaughlin (mək-LOF-lin; born April 9, 1996) is an American professional football placekicker for the Tampa Bay Buccaneers of the National Football League (NFL). He played college football for the Illinois Fighting Illini. Since joining the NFL in 2019, McLaughlin has been a member of nine teams, including second stints for two organizations.

== College career ==
McLaughlin played college football at Illinois. During his time with the Fighting Illini, McLaughlin went 79 for 79 on extra point attempts, and his senior year was 4 for 6 on field goals beyond 50 yards. Originally a walk-on, McLaughlin ended his college career as the 2019 Bakken–Andersen Kicker of the Year award winner and a First-team All-Big Ten Conference selection. During a 2018 game against USF, McLaughlin became the first Illinois kicker to score field goals of 50 plus yards in three consecutive games. McLaughlin later achieved a school record five 50-plus yard field goals.

== Professional career ==
Pre-draft measurables
Height	Weight	Arm length	Hand span	Wingspan
5 ft 11 7/8 in (1.83 m)	187 lb (85 kg)	29 5/8 in (0.75 m)	9 1/4 in (0.23 m)	6 ft 1 in (1.85 m)
All values from Pro Day

=== Buffalo Bills ===
McLaughlin went undrafted in the 2019 NFL draft, and signed with the Buffalo Bills as an undrafted free agent. He was waived on August 31, 2019.

=== Minnesota Vikings (first stint) ===
McLaughlin was signed to the practice squad of the Minnesota Vikings on September 1, 2019. He was released nine days later.

=== Los Angeles Chargers ===
McLaughlin signed with the Los Angeles Chargers on October 1, 2019. The move was to cover for injured Chargers kicker Michael Badgley, and to give relief to Chargers punter Ty Long, who had assumed kicking duties. McLaughlin was waived on October 29.

=== San Francisco 49ers ===
McLaughlin signed with the San Francisco 49ers on November 7, 2019, after kicker Robbie Gould injured his quad. During a Week 10 27–24 overtime loss to the Seattle Seahawks on Monday Night Football, McLaughlin made three of four field goals. Although he made a 47-yard kick with one second left in regulation to tie the game, McLaughlin's missed field goal occurred in overtime and would have given San Francisco the victory. He was waived on December 3.

=== Indianapolis Colts ===
On December 4, 2019, McLaughlin was claimed off waivers by the Indianapolis Colts due to an injury to longtime starter Adam Vinatieri. On December 30, McLaughlin was signed to a one-year extension through 2020. In his time with the Chargers, 49ers, and Colts in the 2019 season, he finished converting 18-of-23 field goal attempts and all 26 extra point attempts.

On September 5, 2020, McLaughlin was waived by the Colts during final roster cuts.

=== Minnesota Vikings (second stint) ===
On September 8, 2020, McLaughlin was signed to the Minnesota Vikings' practice squad.

=== Jacksonville Jaguars ===
On November 10, 2020, the Jacksonville Jaguars signed McLaughlin off of the Vikings' practice squad to fill in for the injured Josh Lambo. McLaughlin was placed on the reserve/COVID-19 list by the team on November 24, and activated six days later. McLaughlin was waived by the Jaguars after they promoted Aldrick Rosas to the active roster on December 12.

=== New York Jets ===
On December 14, 2020, McLaughlin was claimed off waivers by the New York Jets. On January 2, 2021, McLaughlin was promoted to full-time starter after the Jets' decision to cut Sam Ficken. In his time with the Jaguars and Jets, he finished converting four out of five field goal attempts and five out of six extra point attempts in the 2020 season.

McLaughlin was waived on May 7, 2021.

=== Cleveland Browns ===
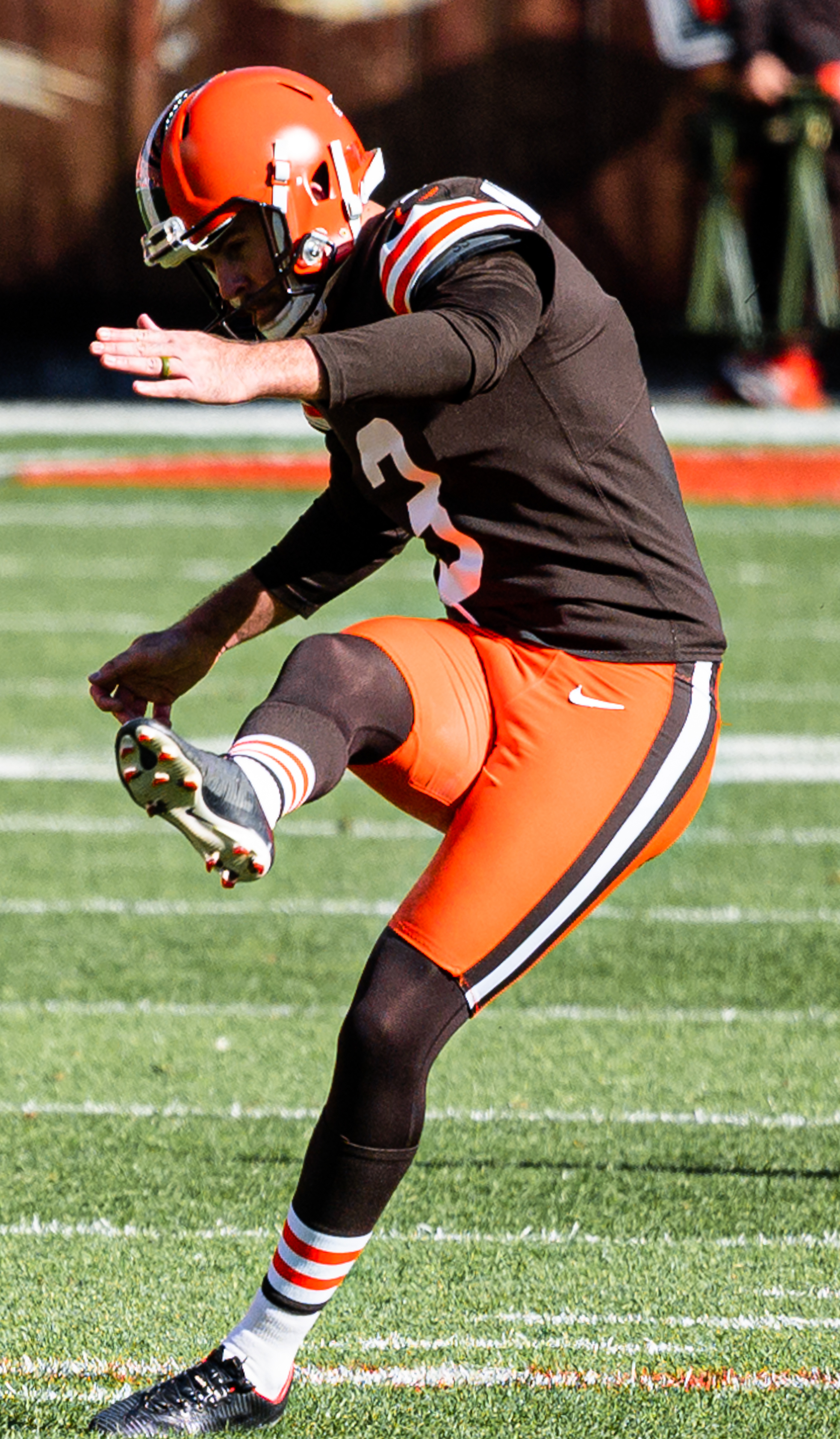
McLaughlin with the Cleveland Browns in 2021

McLaughlin was claimed off waivers by the Cleveland Browns on May 10, 2021. In Week 3 against the Chicago Bears, McLaughlin made all four field goal attempts, including a 57-yarder, as well as both of his extra points. In the 2021 season, McLaughlin finished converting 36 of 37 extra point attempts and 15 of 21 field goal attempts.

On April 5, 2022, McLaughlin re-signed with the Browns. He was waived on May 2.

=== Indianapolis Colts (second stint) ===
McLaughlin signed with the practice squad of the Colts on September 13, 2022, after the team released Rodrigo Blankenship. He was promoted to the active roster on October 4. In Week 5, McLaughlin made all four field goals, including two over 50 yards, in a 12–9 overtime road victory over the Denver Broncos, earning AFC Special Teams Player of the Week honors. He finished the 2022 season converting all 21 extra point attempts and 30 of 36 field goal attempts.

=== Tampa Bay Buccaneers ===
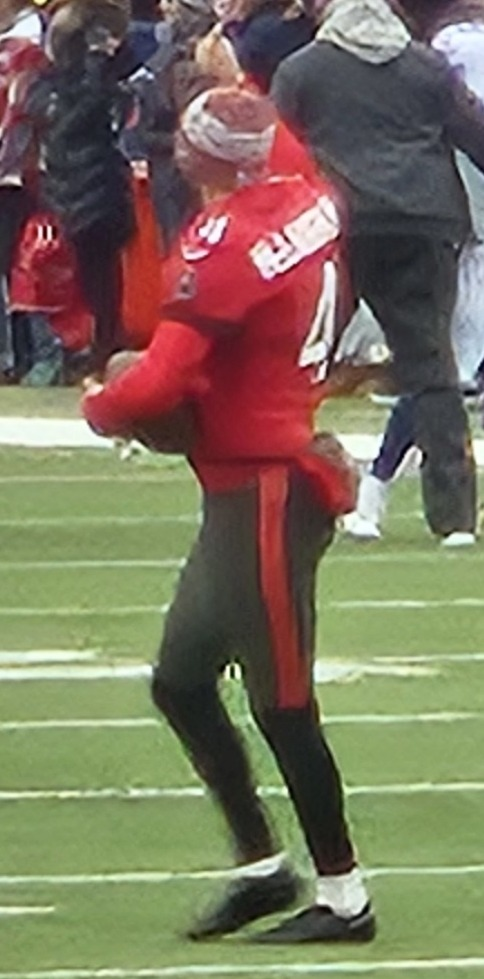
McLaughlin with the Tampa Bay Buccaneers in 2025

On March 30, 2023, McLaughlin signed with the Tampa Bay Buccaneers. He was named the Buccaneers' placekicker at the start of the 2023 season following the release of Rodrigo Blankenship. He finished the 2023 season converting 29-of-31 field goal attempts and all 33 extra point attempts.

On March 11, 2024, McLaughlin signed a three-year, $12.3 million contract extension with the Buccaneers. In the 2024 season, he converted 30-of-32 field goal attempts and 54-of-56 extra point attempts.

On September 28, 2025, during a Week 4 game at home against the Philadelphia Eagles, McLaughlin set the Buccaneer franchise record with a 65-yard field goal to end the first half, the longest field goal made in an outdoor stadium. In Week 8, McLaughlin kicked three field goals over 50 yards in a 23-3 win over the New Orleans Saints, earning NFC Special Teams Player of the Week. He finished the 2025 season converting 32-of-38 field goal attempts and 32-of-33 extra point attempts.

McLaughlin was named NFC Special Teams Player of the Month for October of the 2026 NFL season after going perfect on all 18 attempts.

== NFL career statistics ==
**Bold**	Career High

=== Regular season ===
Year	Team	GP	Field goals				Extra points			Points
Year	Team	GP	FGA	FGM	Lng	Pct	XPA	XPM	Pct	Points
2019	LAC	4	9	6	50	66.7	7	7	**100.0**	25
2019	SF	3	8	7	47	87.5	8	8	**100.0**	29
2019	IND	4	6	5	50	83.3	11	11	**100.0**	26
2020	JAX	3	5	4	52	80.0	4	3	75.0	15
2020	NYJ	1	−	−	−	−	2	2	**100.0**	2
2021	CLE	16	21	15	57	71.4	37	36	97.3	81
2022	IND	16	36	30	54	83.3	21	21	**100.0**	111
2023	TB	**17**	31	29	57	93.5	33	33	**100.0**	120
2024	TB	**17**	32	30	56	**93.8**	**56**	**54**	96.4	**144**
2025	TB	17	**38**	**32**	**65**	84.2	33	32	97.0	128
2026	TB	9	22	22	59	100.0	18	18	100.0	84
Career		107	208	180	65	86.5	230	225	97.8	765

=== Postseason ===
Year	Team	GP	Field goals				Extra points			Points
Year	Team	GP	FGA	FGM	Lng	Pct	XPA	XPM	Pct	Points
2023	TB	**2**	**5**	**4**	**54**	80.0	**5**	**5**	**100.0**	**17**
2024	TB	1	2	2	50	**100.0**	2	2	**100.0**	10
Career		3	7	6	54	85.7	7	7	100.0	27

== Personal life ==
McLaughlin has three children with his wife, Jess. The couple currently resides in Tampa.
