= Luke Haggard =

American football player (born 2000)

No. 72 – Tampa Bay Buccaneers
- Position: Offensive tackle
- Roster status: Practice squad

Personal information
- Born: January 3, 2000 (age 26)
- Listed height: 6 ft 7 in (2.01 m)
- Listed weight: 305 lb (138 kg)

Career information
- High school: Petaluma (Petaluma, California)
- College: Santa Rosa (2018–2019); Indiana (2020–2022)
- NFL draft: 2023: undrafted

Career history
- Tampa Bay Buccaneers (2023–present)

Career NFL statistics as of Week 8, 2026
- Games Played: 13
- Games Started: 4
- Stats at Pro Football Reference

Luke Haggard (born January 3, 2000) is an American professional football offensive tackle for the Tampa Bay Buccaneers of the National Football League (NFL). He played college football for the Santa Rosa Bear Cubs and Indiana Hoosiers and signed with the Buccaneers as an undrafted free agent in 2023.

== Early life ==
Haggard was born on January 3, 2000, and grew up in Petaluma, California. He started playing football in eighth grade. He attended Petaluma High School where he played football, rugby and lacrosse. In football, he was a two-way lineman and the tallest player on the team. Haggard was named first-team All-Redwood Empire as an offensive tackle in his junior year and then repeated as a senior when he helped Petaluma to a record of 8–2. He was also selected All-Bay 6 Conference and All-NorCal Region. After high school, Haggard enrolled at Santa Rosa Junior College.

== College career ==
Haggard initially did not plan to play college football at Santa Rosa, but eventually was convinced by their head coach to do so. He played for the Santa Rosa Bear Cubs from 2018 to 2019 as an offensive tackle. In his two seasons there, he was selected all-conference and all-region. In 2020, he transferred to the Indiana Hoosiers. That year, he appeared in six games, four as a starter. Haggard then served as the team's starting left tackle in 2021 and 2022. He started 11 games in 2021, earning the Chris Dal Sasso Award as Indiana's best lineman, then all 10 games in 2022. He finished his stint at Indiana having appeared in 27 games, 25 as a starter.

== Professional career ==
Pre-draft measurables
Height	Weight	Arm length	Hand span	Wingspan	40-yard dash	10-yard split	20-yard split	Three-cone drill	Vertical jump	Broad jump	Bench press
6 ft 6 1/8 in (1.98 m)	302 lb (137 kg)	33 1/8 in (0.84 m)	10 1/8 in (0.26 m)	6 ft 8 1/2 in (2.04 m)	5.17 s	1.75 s	2.92 s	7.75 s	28.0 in (0.71 m)	9 ft 0 in (2.74 m)	23 reps
All values from Pro Day

After going unselected in the 2023 NFL draft, Haggard signed with the Tampa Bay Buccaneers as an undrafted free agent. He was waived by the Buccaneers on August 29, 2023, then re-signed to the practice squad the next day. After spending the entire season on the practice squad, Haggard signed a reserve/future contract with the Buccaneers on January 23, 2024. He was waived again on August 27, and re-signed to the practice squad two days later. Haggard signed another reserve/future contract with Tampa Bay after the season, on January 14, 2025.

Haggard was waived on August 26, 2025, and re-signed to the practice squad two days later. He was promoted to the active roster on September 18.

On November 4, 2026, Haggard was waived by the Buccaneers. On November 10, he was re-signed to the practice squad.
