= Ayden Garnes =

American football player (born 2003)

No. 24 – Tampa Bay Buccaneers
- Position: Cornerback
- Roster status: Active

Personal information
- Born: March 20, 2003 (age 23); Philadelphia, Pennsylvania, U.S.
- Listed height: 6 ft 0 in (1.83 m)
- Listed weight: 181 lb (82 kg)

Career information
- High school: Monsignor Bonner (Drexel Hill, Pennsylvania)
- College: Duquesne (2021–2023); West Virginia (2024); Arizona (2025)
- NFL draft: 2026: undrafted

Career history
- Tampa Bay Buccaneers (2026–present)

Career NFL statistics as of Week 4, 2026
- Games played: 1
- Stats at Pro Football Reference

Ayden Marquese Garnes (born March 20, 2003) is an American professional football cornerback for the Tampa Bay Buccaneers of the National Football League (NFL). He played college football for the Arizona Wildcats, Duquesne Dukes, and West Virginia Mountaineers.

== Early life ==
Garnes attended Monsignor Bonner and Archbishop Prendergast High School in Drexel Hill, Pennsylvania. He committed to play college football for the Duquesne Dukes. Ayden is the son of Kevin Garnes and Jerelle Holden. Ayden also has a little brother named Bryce.

== College career ==
In three years at Duquesne from 2021 to 2023, Garnes recorded 78 tackles, three pass deflections, four interceptions, and a blocked kick. After the 2023 season, he entered the NCAA transfer portal.

Garnes transferred to play for the West Virginia Mountaineers. In 2024, he was limited to six games due to a hand injury, recording 25 tackles and a pass deflection. After the season, Garnes once again entered the NCAA transfer portal.

Garnes transferred to play for the Arizona Wildcats. In 2025, he started all 13 games, notching 43 tackles with one and a half being for a loss, eight pass deflections, and an interception. After the season, Garnes declared for the NFL draft.

== Professional career ==
Pre-draft measurables
Height	Weight	Arm length	Hand span	Wingspan	40-yard dash	10-yard split	20-yard split	20-yard shuttle	Three-cone drill	Vertical jump	Broad jump	Bench press
5 ft 11 1/4 in (1.81 m)	183 lb (83 kg)	31 1/4 in (0.79 m)	8 5/8 in (0.22 m)	6 ft 2 1/2 in (1.89 m)	4.43 s	1.58 s	2.61 s	4.27 s	7.03 s	36.0 in (0.91 m)	10 ft 9 in (3.28 m)	10 reps
All values from Pro Day

After going undrafted in the 2026 NFL draft, Garnes signed with the Tampa Bay Buccaneers as an undrafted free agent.
