= Ben Chukwuma =

Nigerian American football player (born 2001)

No. 70 – Tampa Bay Buccaneers
- Position: Offensive tackle
- Roster status: Active

Personal information
- Born: May 8, 2001 (age 25); Nigeria
- Listed height: 6 ft 6 in (1.98 m)
- Listed weight: 310 lb (141 kg)

Career information
- High school: Campbell (Smyrna, Georgia, U.S.)
- College: Georgia State (2020–2024)
- NFL draft: 2025: undrafted

Career history
- Tampa Bay Buccaneers (2025–present)

Career NFL statistics as of 2025
- Games Played: 17
- Games Started: 2
- Stats at Pro Football Reference

Benjamin Chukwuma (born May 8, 2001) is a Nigerian professional player of American football who is an offensive tackle for the Tampa Bay Buccaneers of the National Football League (NFL). He previously played college football for the Georgia State Panthers.

== Early life ==
Chukwuma was born in Nigeria and moved to Georgia at age 17. After previously focusing on soccer and basketball, he took up football and later walked on at Georgia State.

== College career ==
At Georgia State (2020–2024), Chukwuma appeared in 23 games with 12 starts between 2023 and 2024.

== Professional career ==
Pre-draft measurables
Height	Weight	Arm length	Hand span	Wingspan	40-yard dash	10-yard split	20-yard split	20-yard shuttle	Three-cone drill	Vertical jump	Broad jump	Bench press
6 ft 5 3/4 in (1.97 m)	303 lb (137 kg)	33 7/8 in (0.86 m)	10 1/8 in (0.26 m)	6 ft 11 1/8 in (2.11 m)	5.34 s	1.84 s	3.02 s	5.03 s	8.03 s	24.0 in (0.61 m)	8 ft 10 in (2.69 m)	22 reps
All values from Pro Day

After not being selected in the 2025 NFL draft, Chukwuma signed with the Tampa Bay Buccaneers on May 9, 2025. He reportedly received $300,000 guaranteed, the largest guarantee among 2025 undrafted free agents. On August 27, 2025, he made Tampa Bay’s initial 53-man roster.
