= Caden Fordham =

American football player (born 2002)

No. 46 – Tampa Bay Buccaneers
- Position: Linebacker
- Roster status: Active

Personal information
- Born: October 21, 2002 (age 24); Ponte Vedra, Florida, U.S.
- Listed height: 6 ft 1 in (1.85 m)
- Listed weight: 223 lb (101 kg)

Career information
- High school: The Bolles (Jacksonville, Florida)
- College: NC State (2021–2025)
- NFL draft: 2026: undrafted

Career history
- Tampa Bay Buccaneers (2026–present)

Awards and highlights
- First-team All-ACC (2025)

Career NFL statistics as of 2026
- Games played: 1
- Stats at Pro Football Reference
- Stats at Pro Football Reference

Caden Fordham (born October 21, 2002) is an American professional football linebacker for the Tampa Bay Buccaneers of the National Football League (NFL). He played college football for the NC State Wolfpack and he was signed as an undrafted free agent by the Buccaneers in 2026.

== Early life ==
Fordham attended The Bolles School in Jacksonville, Florida. Coming out of high school, he was rated as a three-star recruit and committed to play college football for the NC State Wolfpack over offers from other schools such as Louisville, Miami, Wake Forest, and Georgia Tech.

== College career ==
In his first two seasons from 2021 to 2022, Fordham played in 16 games, totaling eight tackles. In the 2023 season, he appeared in all 13 games, notching 53 tackles with four being for a loss and a pass deflection. During the 2024 season, Fordham played in six games before suffering a season-ending knee injury, where he recorded 48 tackles, a sack, two pass deflections, and a fumble recovery. In week 11 of the 2025 season, he totaled 15 tackles and the game-sealing interception in an upset win over Georgia Tech. In week 13, Fordham recorded 15 tackles in a victory versus Florida State. In the regular season finale, he tallied 12 tackles and a sack in a win against rival North Carolina. In the 2025 Gasparilla Bowl, Fordham notched 13 tackles with one and a half going for a loss and an interception, and was named the bowl's MVP. He finished the 2025 season totaling 143 tackles with 10.5 being for a loss, three and a half sacks, three pass deflections, two interceptions, a fumble recovery, and a forced fumble, earning first-team all-ACC and second-team All-American honors by the Sporting News.

== Professional career ==
Pre-draft measurables
Height	Weight	Arm length	Hand span	Wingspan	40-yard dash	10-yard split	20-yard split	20-yard shuttle	Three-cone drill	Vertical jump	Broad jump	Bench press
6 ft 0 5/8 in (1.84 m)	223 lb (101 kg)	30 1/2 in (0.77 m)	8 5/8 in (0.22 m)	6 ft 2 in (1.88 m)	4.67 s	1.56 s	2.70 s	4.34 s	6.89 s	30.0 in (0.76 m)	9 ft 6 in (2.90 m)	20 reps
All values from Pro Day

Fordham signed with the Tampa Bay Buccaneers as an undrafted free agent on May 8, 2026. He was waived by the Buccaneers on September 1. The following day, Tampa Bay re–signed Fordham to their practice squad. He was activated on October 24 for their away game against the Carolina Panthers.

== Personal life ==
Fordham is the son of former NFL offensive tackle Todd Fordham.
