= Elijah Simmons =

American football player (born 2001)

No. 92 – Tampa Bay Buccaneers
- Position: Nose tackle
- Roster status: Active

Personal information
- Born: July 26, 2001 (age 25); Memphis, Tennessee, U.S.
- Listed height: 6 ft 1 in (1.85 m)
- Listed weight: 335 lb (152 kg)

Career information
- High school: Pearl-Cohn (Nashville, Tennessee)
- College: Tennessee (2019–2024)
- NFL draft: 2025: undrafted

Career history
- Arizona Cardinals (2025)*; Tampa Bay Buccaneers (2025–present)
- * Offseason or practice squad member only

Career NFL statistics as of Week 11, 2025
- Tackles: 4
- Stats at Pro Football Reference

Elijah Well Simmons (born July 26, 2001) is an American professional football nose tackle for the Tampa Bay Buccaneers of the National Football League (NFL). He played college football for the Tennessee Volunteers.

== Early life ==
Simmons was born on July 26, 2001 in Memphis, Tennessee and moved to Nashville, Tennessee when he was eight. Simmons attended Pearl-Cohn Comprehensive High School in Nashville. In his sophomore and junior seasons he combined for 85 tackles as he was named all-Area in his junior season as he helped lead his team to back-to-back playoff semifinal appearances. Simmons also won state titles in both shot put and discus. Coming out of high school, he was rated as a three-star recruit and committed to play college football for the Tennessee Volunteers over offers from Memphis and Missouri.

== College career ==
As a freshman in 2019, Simmons appeared in three games and took a redshirt. In 2020, he played in ten games for the Volunteers, where he tallied ten tackles and a pass deflection. In 2021, Simmons appeared in seven games with four starts, where he notched 11 tackles with two being for a loss. In 2022, he posted eight tackles with one going for a loss for Tennessee. In 2023, Simmons recorded 19 tackles with three being for a loss for the Volunteers. In 2024, he played in all 13 games for Tennessee, making two starts, where he totaled 11 tackles with one and a half being for a loss.

== Professional career ==
Simmons declared for the 2025 NFL draft, while also accepting an invite to participate in the 2025 NFL Scouting Combine.

Pre-draft measurables
Height	Weight	Arm length	Hand span	Wingspan	40-yard dash	10-yard split	20-yard split	Vertical jump	Broad jump
6 ft 1 in (1.85 m)	334 lb (151 kg)	32 3/4 in (0.83 m)	10 1/4 in (0.26 m)	6 ft 8 in (2.03 m)	5.37 s	1.88 s	3.11 s	32.0 in (0.81 m)	8 ft 10 in (2.69 m)
All values from NFL Combine

=== Arizona Cardinals ===
On April 28, 2025, Simmons signed with the Arizona Cardinals as an undrafted free agent. He was waived on August 26 as part of final roster cuts and re-signed to the practice squad the next day.

=== Tampa Bay Buccaneers ===
On September 17, 2025, the Tampa Bay Buccaneers signed Simmons to their active roster off the Cardinals' practice squad.
