= Chris Rubio =

American football trainer

No. 64
- Position: Long snapper

Career information
- High school: Charter Oak High School
- College: UCLA

Chris Rubio is an American football trainer of long snappers. He works with high school long snappers and evaluates them for college football programs. His Rubio's Long Snapping Camp is recognized as the longest-running long-snapping camp in the nation.

Over the past 17 years, Rubio has helped over 1,000 long snappers play football in college and the NFL. Rubio runs Long Snapping camps all around the US, with the premier event being held in Las Vegas, Nevada. His Las Vegas event has grown from about 15 participants in the mid-2000s to about 350 participants in 2018. During the COVID-19 pandemic, he used virtual training sessions as his main coaching tool. Rubio partners with Chris Sailer, who provides a similar service for placekickers and punters with Chris Sailer Kicking. The two were teammates in college with the UCLA Bruins.

He selects the participants for the US Army All-American Bowl and Polynesian Bowl each year. Rubio is a co-founder of the Patrick Mannelly Award, given to the best Long Snapper at the Division I FBS level. Over the last 17 years, Rubio has helped over 1,000 high school and junior college long snappers. Alumni from Rubio’s camps include former and current NFL long snappers, such as Cole Mazza, Aaron Brewer, Jon Weeks, Taybor Pepper, Rick Lovato, Kameron Canaday, Reid Ferguson, Carson Tinker, Scott Daly, Camaron Cheeseman, Jon Cardona, and Christian Yount. Rubio has helped to coach and sculpt two long snappers that were drafted in the past two years, Blake Ferguson and Thomas Fletcher.

One of Rubio's former students, Tanner Gibas, created a documentary about Rubio and his impact on the Long Snapping community.

Recently, Rubio has been featured in an NFL Films show on Long Snapping (Long Snapping Bros: A Closer Look at "the Mannings of Long Snapping" | NFL Films Presents), a full episode on Freakonomics and is set to host The Rubio Method (a national tv show on men's health).
