= Connellsville Municipal Authority =

Agency overview
- Formed: 1951
- Type: Sewage Treatment
- Headquarters: 100 Association Lane; Connellsville, Pennsylvania

Connellsville Municipal Authority provides sewage treatment to Connellsville, South Connellsville, and Connellsville Township in Fayette County, Pennsylvania.

== Wastewater Treatment Plant ==
The wastewater plant is located at the confluence of Mountz Creek and the Youghiogheny River and discharges into the Youghiogheny in the North Manor section of Connellsville. The plant has a capacity of processing 3,240,000 gallons of wastewater per day. Wastewater from the areas of Connellsville Township bordering the city limits as well as the South Connellsville Municipal Authority and the Bullskin Township/Connellsville Township Joint Sewerage Authority is treated at this facility.

== Municipal Authority Customer Rates ==
Customers within the city and those Connellsville Township customers billed by the authority are charged around $50.00 for the first 3,500 gallons and $2.75 per an additional 1,000 gallons of water used.

== See also ==
- List of municipal authorities in Fayette County, Pennsylvania
