= 2026 NFL draft =

2026 American football draft

General information
- Date: April 23–25, 2026
- Location: Acrisure Stadium (Pittsburgh, Pennsylvania)
- Networks: ESPN, ABC, NFL Network, ESPN Deportes, ESPN Radio

Overview
- 257 total selections in 7 rounds
- League: National Football League
- First selection: Fernando Mendoza, QB, Las Vegas Raiders
- Mr. Irrelevant: Red Murdock, LB, Denver Broncos
- Most selections (13): Miami Dolphins
- Fewest selections (5): Los Angeles Rams

The 2026 NFL draft was the 91st annual meeting of National Football League (NFL) franchises to select newly eligible players. The event was held in Pittsburgh, Pennsylvania, from April 23 to 25, 2026. The draft set an all-time NFL draft attendance record, with a reported attendance of 805,000 over three days. The time between first-round selections was shortened from 10 minutes to 8. Times between selections in other rounds remained unchanged. The Las Vegas Raiders held the first overall pick and selected Indiana Hoosiers quarterback Fernando Mendoza, the first Hoosier to be selected in the first round since 1994, and the first Hoosier to be selected first overall since 1938.

== Host city ==
On May 22, 2024, it was announced that Pittsburgh would be the host city. It was the first time since the 1948 NFL draft that the event had been held in Pittsburgh. It was held outside of Acrisure Stadium, home of the Pittsburgh Steelers, and nearby Point State Park, Dawn Aponte did not make it to the stage for the first time since 2020. The draft set an all-time NFL Draft attendance record, with a reported attendance of 805,000 over three days.

== Player selections ==
Selections are listed according to the NFL's official draft tracker.

| * | Compensatory selection |
| × | Resolution JC-2A selection |

Positions key
| Offense | Defense | Special teams |
|---|---|---|
| QB — Quarterback; RB — Running back; FB — Fullback; WR — Wide receiver; TE — Tight end; OL — Offensive lineman; T — Tackle; G — Guard; C — Center | DL — Defensive lineman; DT — Defensive tackle (Note: Includes nose tackle (NT)); DE — Defensive end; EDGE — Edge rusher; LB — Linebacker (Note: Includes middle linebacker (MLB/MIKE), weakside linebacker (WILL), strongside linebacker (SAM), off-ball linebacker, and outside linebacker (OLB)); DB — Defensive back; CB — Cornerback; S — Safety (Note: Includes free safety (FS) and strong safety (SS)) | K — Kicker (Note: Also known as a placekicker (PK)); P — Punter; LS — Long snapper; RS — Return specialist (Note: Includes kickoff and punt returners) |

| Rnd. | Pick | Team | Player | Pos. | College | Notes |
|---|---|---|---|---|---|---|
| 1 | 1 | Las Vegas Raiders | Fernando Mendoza | QB | Indiana | 2025 Heisman Trophy winner |
| 1 | 2 | New York Jets | David Bailey | OLB | Texas Tech | |
| 1 | 3 | Arizona Cardinals | Jeremiyah Love | RB | Notre Dame | 2025 Doak Walker Award winner |
| 1 | 4 | Tennessee Titans | Carnell Tate | WR | Ohio State | |
| 1 | 5 | New York Giants | Arvell Reese | LB | Ohio State | |
| 1 | 6 | Kansas City Chiefs | Mansoor Delane | CB | LSU | from Cleveland (Note: No. 6: Cleveland → Kansas City (D). Cleveland traded a first-round selection (6th overall) to Kansas City in exchange for first-, third- and fifth round selections (9th, 74th and 148th overall).) |
| 1 | 7 | Washington Commanders | Sonny Styles | LB | Ohio State | |
| 1 | 8 | New Orleans Saints | Jordyn Tyson | WR | Arizona State | |
| 1 | 9 | Cleveland Browns | Spencer Fano | T | Utah | 2025 Outland Trophy winner; from Kansas City (Note: No. 9: Kansas City → Cleveland (D). See Round 1: Cleveland → Kansas City.) |
| 1 | 10 | New York Giants | Francis Mauigoa | G | Miami (FL) | from Cincinnati (Note: No. 10: Cincinnati → NY Giants (PD). Cincinnati traded a first-round selection (10th overall) to the NY Giants in exchange for DT Dexter Lawrence.) |
| 1 | 11 | Dallas Cowboys | Caleb Downs | S | Ohio State | 2025 Jim Thorpe Award winner; from Miami (Note: No. 11: Miami → Dallas (D). Miami traded a first-round selection (11th overall) to Dallas in exchange for a first-round selection and two fifth-round selections (12th, 177th and 180th overall).) |
| 1 | 12 | Miami Dolphins | Kadyn Proctor | T | Alabama | from Dallas (Note: No. 12: Dallas → Miami (D). See Round 1: Miami → Dallas.) |
| 1 | 13 | Los Angeles Rams | Ty Simpson | QB | Alabama | from Atlanta (Note: No. 13: Atlanta → LA Rams (PD). Atlanta traded a first-round selection (13th overall), and 2025 second- and seventh-round selections to the LA Rams in exchange for 2025 first- and third-round selections.) |
| 1 | 14 | Baltimore Ravens | Vega Ioane | G | Penn State | |
| 1 | 15 | Tampa Bay Buccaneers | Rueben Bain Jr. | DE | Miami (FL) | 2025 Ted Hendricks Award winner |
| 1 | 16 | New York Jets | Kenyon Sadiq | TE | Oregon | from Indianapolis (Note: No. 16: Indianapolis → NY Jets (PD). Indianapolis traded a first-round selection (16th overall), a 2027 first-round selection and WR Adonai Mitchell to the NY Jets in exchange for CB Sauce Gardner.) |
| 1 | 17 | Detroit Lions | Blake Miller | T | Clemson | |
| 1 | 18 | Minnesota Vikings | Caleb Banks | DE | Florida | |
| 1 | 19 | Carolina Panthers | Monroe Freeling | T | Georgia | |
| 1 | 20 | Philadelphia Eagles | Makai Lemon | WR | USC | 2025 Fred Biletnikoff Award winner; from Green Bay via Dallas (Note: No. 20: Green Bay → Dallas → Philadelphia. Multiple trades: Green Bay → Dallas (PD). Green Bay traded a first-round selection (20th overall), a 2027 first-round selection and DT Kenny Clark to Dallas in exchange for DE Micah Parsons. Dallas → Philadelphia (D). Dallas traded a first-round selection (20th overall) and a 2027 seventh-round selection to Philadelphia in exchange for a first- and two fourth-round selections (23rd, 114th and 137th overall).) |
| 1 | 21 | Pittsburgh Steelers | Max Iheanachor | T | Arizona State | |
| 1 | 22 | Los Angeles Chargers | Akheem Mesidor | OLB | Miami (FL) | |
| 1 | 23 | Dallas Cowboys | Malachi Lawrence | DE | UCF | from Philadelphia (Note: No. 23: Philadelphia → Dallas (D). See Round 1: Philadelphia → Dallas.) |
| 1 | 24 | Cleveland Browns | KC Concepcion | WR | Texas A&M | 2025 Paul Hornung Award winner; from Jacksonville (Note: No. 24: Jacksonville → Cleveland (PD). Jacksonville traded a first-round selection (24th overall), and 2025 first-, second- and fourth-round selections to Cleveland in exchange for 2025 first-, fourth- and sixth-round selections.) |
| 1 | 25 | Chicago Bears | Dillon Thieneman | S | Oregon | |
| 1 | 26 | Houston Texans | Keylan Rutledge | G | Georgia Tech | from Buffalo (Note: No. 26: Buffalo → Houston (D). Buffalo traded first- and third-round selections (26th and 91st overall) to Houston in exchange for first-, third- and fifth-round selections (28th, 69th and 167th overall).) |
| 1 | 27 | Miami Dolphins | Chris Johnson | CB | San Diego State | from San Francisco (Note: No. 27: San Francisco → Miami (D). San Francisco traded first- and fourth-round selections (27th and 138th overall) to Miami in exchange for first- and third-round selections (30th and 90th overall).) |
| 1 | 28 | New England Patriots | Caleb Lomu | T | Utah | from Houston via Buffalo (Note: No. 28: Houston → Buffalo → New England. Multiple trades: Houston → Buffalo (D). See Round 1: Buffalo → Houston. Buffalo → New England (D). Buffalo traded a first-round selection (28th overall) to New England in exchange for first- and fourth-round selections (31st and 125th overall).) |
| 1 | 29 | Kansas City Chiefs | Peter Woods | DT | Clemson | from LA Rams (Note: No. 29: LA Rams → Kansas City (PD). The LA Rams traded first-, fifth- and sixth-round selections (29th, 169th and 210th overall), and a 2027 third-round selection to Kansas City in exchange for CB Trent McDuffie.) |
| 1 | 30 | New York Jets | Omar Cooper Jr. | WR | Indiana | from Denver via Miami and San Francisco (Note: No. 30: Denver → Miami → San Francisco → NY Jets. Multiple trades: Denver → Miami (PD). Denver traded first-, third- and fourth-round selections (30th, 94th and 130th overall) to Miami in exchange for a fourth-round selection (111th overall) and WR Jaylen Waddle. Miami → San Francisco (D). See Round 1: San Francisco → Miami. San Francisco → NY Jets (D). San Francisco traded a first-round selection (30th overall) to the NY Jets in exchange for second- and fifth-round selections (33rd and 179th overall).) |
| 1 | 31 | Tennessee Titans | Keldric Faulk | DE | Auburn | from New England via Buffalo (Note: No. 31: New England → Buffalo → Tennessee. Multiple trades: New England → Buffalo (D). See Round 1: Buffalo → New England. Buffalo → Tennessee (D). Buffalo traded first-, third- and fifth-round selections (31st, 69th and 165th overall) to Tennessee in exchange for second-, third- and fourth-round selections (35th, 66th and 101st overall).) |
| 1 | 32 | Seattle Seahawks | Jadarian Price | RB | Notre Dame | |
| 2 | 33 | San Francisco 49ers | De'Zhaun Stribling | WR | Ole Miss | from NY Jets (Note: No. 33: NY Jets → San Francisco (D). See Round 1: San Francisco → NY Jets.) |
| 2 | 34 | Arizona Cardinals | Chase Bisontis | G | Texas A&M | |
| 2 | 35 | Buffalo Bills | T. J. Parker | DE | Clemson | from Tennessee (Note: No. 35: Tennessee → Buffalo (D). See Round 1: Buffalo → Tennessee.) |
| 2 | 36 | Houston Texans | Kayden McDonald | DT | Ohio State | from Las Vegas (Note: No. 36: Las Vegas → Houston (D). Las Vegas traded second- and fourth-round selections (36th and 117th overall) to Houston in exchange for second- and third-round selections (38th and 91st overall).) |
| 2 | 37 | New York Giants | Colton Hood | CB | Tennessee | |
| 2 | 38 | Las Vegas Raiders | Treydan Stukes | S | Arizona | from Washington via Houston (Note: No. 38: Washington → Houston → Las Vegas. Multiple trades: Washington → Houston (PD). Washington traded second- and fourth-round selections (38th and 106th overall), and 2025 third- and seventh-round selections to Houston in exchange for a 2025 fourth-round selection and OT Laremy Tunsil. Houston → Las Vegas (D). See Round 2: Las Vegas → Houston.) |
| 2 | 39 | Cleveland Browns | Denzel Boston | WR | Washington | |
| 2 | 40 | Kansas City Chiefs | R Mason Thomas | DE | Oklahoma | |
| 2 | 41 | Cincinnati Bengals | Cashius Howell | DE | Texas A&M | |
| 2 | 42 | New Orleans Saints | Christen Miller | DT | Georgia | |
| 2 | 43 | Miami Dolphins | Jacob Rodriguez | LB | Texas Tech | 2025 Bronko Nagurski Trophy winner |
| 2 | 44 | Detroit Lions | Derrick Moore | DE | Michigan | from Dallas via NY Jets (Note: No. 44: Dallas → NY Jets → Detroit. Multiple trades: Dallas → NY Jets (PD). Dallas traded a second-round selection (44th overall), a 2027 first-round selection and DT Mazi Smith to the NY Jets in exchange for DT Quinnen Williams. NY Jets → Detroit (PD). The NY Jets traded a second-round selection (44th overall) to Detroit in exchange for second- and fourth- round selections (50th and 128th overall).) |
| 2 | 45 | Baltimore Ravens | Zion Young | OLB | Missouri | |
| 2 | 46 | Tampa Bay Buccaneers | Josiah Trotter | LB | Missouri | |
| 2 | 47 | Pittsburgh Steelers | Germie Bernard | WR | Alabama | from Indianapolis (Note: No. 47: Indianapolis → Pittsburgh (D). Indianapolis traded second- and seventh- round selections (47th and 249th overall) to Pittsburgh in exchange for second-, fourth- and seventh- round selections (53rd, 135th and 237th overall).) |
| 2 | 48 | Atlanta Falcons | Avieon Terrell | CB | Clemson | |
| 2 | 49 | Carolina Panthers | Lee Hunter | DT | Texas Tech | from Minnesota (Note: No. 49: Minnesota → Carolina (D). Minnesota traded second- and sixth- round selections (49th and 196th overall) to Carolina in exchange for second- and fifth- round selections (51st and 159th overall).) |
| 2 | 50 | New York Jets | D'Angelo Ponds | CB | Indiana | from Detroit (Note: No. 50: Detroit → NY Jets (D). See Round 2: NY Jets → Detroit.) |
| 2 | 51 | Minnesota Vikings | Jake Golday | LB | Cincinnati | from Carolina (Note: No. 51: Carolina → Minnesota (D). See Round 2: Minnesota → Carolina.) |
| 2 | 52 | Green Bay Packers | Brandon Cisse | CB | South Carolina | |
| 2 | 53 | Indianapolis Colts | CJ Allen | LB | Georgia | from Pittsburgh (Note: No. 53: Pittsburgh → Indianapolis (D). See Round 2: Indianapolis → Pittsburgh.) |
| 2 | 54 | Philadelphia Eagles | Eli Stowers | TE | Vanderbilt | 2025 John Mackey Award winner |
| 2 | 55 | New England Patriots | Gabe Jacas | DE | Illinois | from LA Chargers (Note: No. 55: LA Chargers → New England (D). The LA Chargers traded a second-round selection (55th overall) to New England in exchange for second-, fourth- and sixth- round selections (63rd, 131st and 202nd overall).) |
| 2 | 56 | Jacksonville Jaguars | Nate Boerkircher | TE | Texas A&M | |
| 2 | 57 | Chicago Bears | Logan Jones | C | Iowa | 2025 Rimington Trophy winner |
| 2 | 58 | Cleveland Browns | Emmanuel McNeil-Warren | S | Toledo | from San Francisco (Note: No. 58: San Francisco → Cleveland (D). San Francisco traded second- and fifth- round selections (58th and 152nd overall) to Cleveland in exchange for third- and fourth-round selections (70th and 107th overall).) |
| 2 | 59 | Houston Texans | Marlin Klein | TE | Michigan | |
| 2 | 60 | Tennessee Titans | Anthony Hill Jr. | LB | Texas | from Buffalo via Chicago (Note: No. 60: Buffalo → Chicago → Tennessee Multiple trades: Buffalo → Chicago (PD). Buffalo traded a second-round selection (60th overall) to Chicago in exchange for a fifth-round selection (165th overall) and WR D. J. Moore. Chicago → Tennessee (D). Chicago traded a second-round selection (60th overall) to Tennessee in exchange for third- and fifth-round selections (69th and 144th overall).) |
| 2 | 61 | Los Angeles Rams | Max Klare | TE | Ohio State | |
| 2 | 62 | Buffalo Bills | Davison Igbinosun | CB | Ohio State | from Denver (Note: No. 62: Denver → Buffalo (D). Denver traded a second-round selection (62nd overall) to Buffalo in exchange for third- and sixth-round selections (66th and 182nd overall).) |
| 2 | 63 | Los Angeles Chargers | Jake Slaughter | C | Florida | from New England (Note: No. 63: New England → LA Chargers (D). See Round 2: LA Chargers → New England.) |
| 2 | 64 | Seattle Seahawks | Bud Clark | S | TCU | |
| 3 | 65 | Arizona Cardinals | Carson Beck | QB | Miami (FL) | |
| 3 | 66 | Denver Broncos | Tyler Onyedim | DT | Texas A&M | from Tennessee via Buffalo (Note: No. 66: Tennessee → Buffalo → Denver. Multiple trades: Tennessee → Buffalo (D). See Round 1: Tennessee → Buffalo. Buffalo → Denver (D). See Round 2: Denver → Buffalo.) |
| 3 | 67 | Las Vegas Raiders | Keyron Crawford | DE | Auburn | |
| 3 | 68 | Philadelphia Eagles | Markel Bell | T | Miami (FL) | from NY Jets (Note: No. 68: NY Jets → Philadelphia (PD). The NY Jets traded a third-round selection (68th overall) to Philadelphia in exchange for LB Haason Reddick.) |
| 3 | 69 | Chicago Bears | Sam Roush | TE | Stanford | from NY Giants via Houston, Buffalo and Tennessee (Note: No. 69: NY Giants → Houston → Buffalo → Tennessee → Chicago. Multiple trades: NY Giants → Houston (PD). The NY Giants traded a third-round selection (69th overall), and 2025 second- and third-round selections to Houston in exchange for a 2025 first-round selection. Houston → Buffalo (D). See Round 1: Buffalo → Houston. Buffalo → Tennessee (D). See Round 1: Buffalo → Tennessee. Tennessee → Chicago (D). See Round 2: Chicago → Tennessee.) |
| 3 | 70 | San Francisco 49ers | Romello Height | OLB | Texas Tech | from Cleveland (Note: No. 70: Cleveland → San Francisco (D). See Round 2: San Francisco → Cleveland.) |
| 3 | 71 | Washington Commanders | Antonio Williams | WR | Clemson | |
| 3 | 72 | Cincinnati Bengals | Tacario Davis | CB | Washington | |
| 3 | 73 | New Orleans Saints | Oscar Delp | TE | Georgia | |
| 3 | 74 | New York Giants | Malachi Fields | WR | Notre Dame | from Kansas City via Cleveland (Note: No. 74: Kansas City → Cleveland → NY Giants. Multiple trades: Kansas City → Cleveland (D). See Round 1: Cleveland → Kansas City. Cleveland → NY Giants (D). Cleveland traded a third-round selection (74th overall) to the NY Giants in exchange for fourth- and fifth- round selections (105th and 145th overall) and a 2027 fourth-round selection.) |
| 3 | 75 | Miami Dolphins | Caleb Douglas | WR | Texas Tech | |
| 3 | 76 | Pittsburgh Steelers | Drew Allar | QB | Penn State | from Dallas (Note: No. 76: Dallas → Pittsburgh (PD). Dallas traded a third-round selection (76th overall) and a 2027 fifth-round selection to Pittsburgh in exchange for a 2027 sixth-round selection and WR George Pickens.) |
| 3 | 77 | Green Bay Packers | Chris McClellan | DT | Missouri | from Tampa Bay (Note: No. 77: Tampa Bay → Green Bay (D). Tampa Bay traded a third-round selection (77th overall) to Green Bay in exchange for third- and fifth-round selections (84th and 160th overall).) |
| 3 | 78 | Indianapolis Colts | A. J. Haulcy | S | LSU | |
| 3 | 79 | Atlanta Falcons | Zachariah Branch | WR | Georgia | 2023 Jet Award winner |
| 3 | 80 | Baltimore Ravens | Ja'Kobi Lane | WR | USC | |
| 3 | 81 | Jacksonville Jaguars | Albert Regis | DT | Texas A&M | from Detroit (Note: No. 81: Detroit → Jacksonville (PD). Detroit traded two third-round selections (81st and 100th overall) and a 2025 third-round selection to Jacksonville in exchange for a sixth-round selection (213th overall), and 2025 third- and sixth-round selections.) |
| 3 | 82 | Minnesota Vikings | Domonique Orange | DT | Iowa State | |
| 3 | 83 | Carolina Panthers | Chris Brazzell II | WR | Tennessee | |
| 3 | 84 | Tampa Bay Buccaneers | Ted Hurst | WR | Georgia State | from Green Bay (Note: No. 84: Green Bay → Tampa Bay (D). See Round 3: Tampa Bay → Green Bay.) |
| 3 | 85 | Pittsburgh Steelers | Daylen Everette | CB | Georgia | |
| 3 | 86 | Cleveland Browns | Austin Barber | T | Florida | from LA Chargers (Note: No. 86: LA Chargers → Cleveland (D). The LA Chargers traded a third-round selection (86th overall) to Cleveland in exchange for fourth-, fifth- and sixth-round selections (105th, 145th and 206th overall).) |
| 3 | 87 | Miami Dolphins | Will Kacmarek | TE | Ohio State | from Philadelphia (Note: No. 87: Philadelphia → Miami (PD). Philadelphia traded a third-round selection (87th overall) to Miami in exchange for LB Jaelan Phillips.) |
| 3 | 88 | Jacksonville Jaguars | Emmanuel Pregnon | G | Oregon | |
| 3 | 89 | Chicago Bears | Zavion Thomas | WR | LSU | |
| 3 | 90 | San Francisco 49ers | Kaelon Black | RB | Indiana | from Houston via Miami (Note: No. 90: Houston → Miami → San Francisco. Multiple trades: Houston → Miami (PD). Houston traded a third-round selection (90th overall) and a 2025 sixth-round selection to Miami in exchange for 2025 fourth- and seventh-round selections. Miami → San Francisco (D). See Round 1: San Francisco → Miami.) |
| 3 | 91 | Las Vegas Raiders | Trey Zuhn III | C | Texas A&M | from Buffalo via Houston (Note: No. 91: Buffalo → Houston → Las Vegas. Multiple trades: Buffalo → Houston (D). See Round 1: Buffalo → Houston. Houston → Las Vegas (D). See Round 2: Las Vegas → Houston.) |
| 3 | 92 | Dallas Cowboys | Jaishawn Barham | OLB | Michigan | from San Francisco (Note: No. 92: San Francisco → Dallas (PD). San Francisco traded a third-round selection (92nd overall) to Dallas in exchange for DT Osa Odighizuwa.) |
| 3 | 93 | Los Angeles Rams | Keagen Trost | T | Missouri | |
| 3 | 94 | Miami Dolphins | Chris Bell | WR | Louisville | from Denver (Note: No. 94: Denver → Miami (PD). See Round 1: Denver → Miami.) |
| 3 | 95 | New England Patriots | Eli Raridon | TE | Notre Dame | |
| 3 | 96 | Pittsburgh Steelers | Gennings Dunker | T | Iowa | from Seattle (Note: No. 96: Seattle → Pittsburgh (D). Seattle traded a third-round selection (96th overall) to Pittsburgh in exchange for third- and sixth-round selections (99th and 216th overall).) |
| 3* | 97 | Minnesota Vikings | Caleb Tiernan | T | Northwestern | |
| 3* | 98 | Minnesota Vikings | Jakobe Thomas | S | Miami (FL) | from Philadelphia (Note: No. 98: Philadelphia → Minnesota (D). Philadelphia traded a third-round selection (98th overall) and 2027 third-round selection to Minnesota in exchange for a seventh-round selection (244th overall) and LB Jonathan Greenard.) |
| 3* | 99 | Seattle Seahawks | Julian Neal | CB | Arkansas | from Pittsburgh (Note: No. 99: Pittsburgh → Seattle (D). See Round 3: Seattle → Pittsburgh.) |
| 3× | 100 | Jacksonville Jaguars | Jalen Huskey | S | Maryland | 2020 Resolution JC-2A selection; from Detroit (Note: Detroit received a third-round selection after the NY Jets hired former Detroit defensive coordinator Aaron Glenn as head coach. This selection was traded to Jacksonville. (Note: No. 100: Detroit → Jacksonville (PD). See Round 3: Detroit → Jacksonville.)) |
| 4 | 101 | Las Vegas Raiders | Jermod McCoy | CB | Tennessee | from Tennessee via Buffalo (Note: No. 101: Tennessee → Buffalo → Las Vegas. Multiple trades: Tennessee → Buffalo (D). See Round 1: Buffalo → Tennessee. Buffalo → Las Vegas (D). Buffalo traded a fourth-round selection (101st overall) to Las Vegas in exchange for a fourth-round selection (102nd overall) and a 2027 seventh-round selection.) |
| 4 | 102 | Buffalo Bills | Jude Bowry | T | Boston College | from Las Vegas (Note: No. 102: Las Vegas → Buffalo (D). See Round 4: Buffalo → Las Vegas.) |
| 4 | 103 | New York Jets | Darrell Jackson Jr. | DT | Florida State | |
| 4 | 104 | Arizona Cardinals | Kaleb Proctor | DT | Southeastern Louisiana | |
| 4 | 105 | Los Angeles Chargers | Brenen Thompson | WR | Mississippi State | from NY Giants via Cleveland (Note: No. 105: NY Giants → Cleveland → LA Chargers. Multiple trades: NY Giants → Cleveland (D). See Round 3: Cleveland → NY Giants. Cleveland → LA Chargers (D). See Round 3: LA Chargers → Cleveland.) |
| 4 | 106 | Houston Texans | Febechi Nwaiwu | G | Oklahoma | from Washington (Note: No. 106: Washington → Houston (PD). See Round 2: Washington → Houston.) |
| 4 | 107 | San Francisco 49ers | Gracen Halton | DT | Oklahoma | from Cleveland (Note: No. 107: Cleveland → San Francisco (D). See Round 2: San Francisco → Cleveland.) |
| 4 | 108 | Denver Broncos | Jonah Coleman | RB | Washington | from New Orleans (Note: No. 108: New Orleans → Denver (PD). New Orleans traded a fourth-round selection (108th overall) and a 2027 seventh-round selection to Denver in exchange for WR Devaughn Vele.) |
| 4 | 109 | Kansas City Chiefs | Jadon Canady | CB | Oregon | |
| 4 | 110 | New York Jets | Cade Klubnik | QB | Clemson | from Cincinnati (Note: No. 110: Cincinnati → NY Jets (D). Cincinnati traded fourth- and sixth-round selections (110th and 199th overall) to the NY Jets in exchange for two fourth-round selections (128th and 140th overall).) |
| 4 | 111 | Denver Broncos | Kage Casey | T | Boise State | from Miami (Note: No. 111: Miami → Denver (PD). See Round 1: Denver → Miami.) |
| 4 | 112 | Dallas Cowboys | Drew Shelton | T | Penn State | |
| 4 | 113 | Indianapolis Colts | Jalen Farmer | G | Kentucky | |
| 4 | 114 | Dallas Cowboys | Devin Moore | CB | Florida | from Atlanta via Philadelphia (Note: No. 114: Atlanta → Philadelphia → Dallas. Multiple trades: Atlanta → Philadelphia (PD). Atlanta traded fourth- and sixth-round selections (114th and 197th overall) to Philadelphia in exchange for fourth- and sixth-round selections (122nd and 215th overall) and S Sydney Brown. Philadelphia → Dallas (D). See Round 1: Philadelphia → Dallas.) |
| 4 | 115 | Baltimore Ravens | Elijah Sarratt | WR | Indiana | |
| 4 | 116 | Tampa Bay Buccaneers | Keionte Scott | CB | Miami (FL) | |
| 4 | 117 | Los Angeles Chargers | Travis Burke | T | Memphis | from Minnesota via Jacksonville, Las Vegas and Houston (Note: No. 117: Minnesota → Jacksonville → Las Vegas → Houston → LA Chargers. Multiple trades: Minnesota → Jacksonville (PD). Minnesota traded a conditional fifth-round selection to Jacksonville in exchange for a conditional seventh-round selection and OT Cam Robinson; the fifth-round selection became a fourth-round selection (117th overall) and the seventh-round selection was returned to Jacksonville based on playing time conditions Robinson met. Jacksonville → Las Vegas (PD). Jacksonville traded fourth- and sixth-round selections (117th and 182nd overall) to Las Vegas in exchange for WR Jakobi Meyers. Las Vegas → Houston (D). See Round 2: Las Vegas → Houston. Houston → LA Chargers (D). Houston traded a fourth-round selection (117th overall) to the LA Chargers in exchange for fourth- and sixth-round selections (123rd and 204th overall).) |
| 4 | 118 | Detroit Lions | Jimmy Rolder | LB | Michigan | |
| 4 | 119 | Jacksonville Jaguars | Wesley Williams | DE | Duke | from Carolina (Note: No. 119: Carolina → Jacksonville (D). Carolina traded fourth- and sixth-round selections (119th and 196th overall) to Jacksonville in exchange for fourth- and fifth- round selections (124th and 166th overall).) |
| 4 | 120 | Green Bay Packers | Dani Dennis-Sutton | DE | Penn State | |
| 4 | 121 | Pittsburgh Steelers | Kaden Wetjen | WR | Iowa | 2024 and 2025 Jet Award winner |
| 4 | 122 | Las Vegas Raiders | Mike Washington Jr. | RB | Arkansas | from Philadelphia via Atlanta (Note: No. 122: Philadelphia → Atlanta → Las Vegas. Multiple trades: Philadelphia → Atlanta (PD). See Round 4: Atlanta → Philadelphia. Atlanta → Las Vegas (D). Atlanta traded a fourth-round selection (122nd overall) to Las Vegas in exchange for fourth- and sixth-round selections (134th and 208th overall).) |
| 4 | 123 | Houston Texans | Wade Woodaz | LB | Clemson | from LA Chargers (Note: No. 123: LA Chargers → Houston (D). See Round 4: Houston → LA Chargers.) |
| 4 | 124 | Chicago Bears | Malik Muhammad | CB | Texas | from Jacksonville via Carolina (Note: No. 124: Jacksonville → Carolina → Chicago. Multiple trades: Jacksonville → Carolina (D). See Round 4: Carolina → Jacksonville. Carolina → Chicago (D). Carolina traded fourth- and fifth-round selections (124th and 166th overall) to Chicago in exchange for fourth- and fifth-round selections (129th and 144th overall).) |
| 4 | 125 | Buffalo Bills | Skyler Bell | WR | UConn | from Chicago via Kansas City and New England (Note: No. 125: Chicago → Kansas City → New England → Buffalo. Multiple trades: Chicago → Kansas City (PD). Chicago traded a fourth-round selection (125th overall) to Kansas City in exchange for G Joe Thuney. Kansas City → New England (PD). Kansas City traded a fourth-round selection (125th overall) and a 2025 third-round selection to New England in exchange for a 2025 third-round selection. New England → Buffalo (D). See Round 1: Buffalo → New England.) |
| 4 | 126 | Buffalo Bills | Kaleb Elarms-Orr | LB | TCU | |
| 4 | 127 | San Francisco 49ers | Carver Willis | T | Washington | |
| 4 | 128 | Cincinnati Bengals | Connor Lew | C | Auburn | from Houston via Detroit and NY Jets (Note: No. 128: Houston → Detroit → NY Jets → Cincinnati. Multiple trades: No. 128: Houston → Detroit (PD). Houston traded a fourth-round selection (128th overall), a 2027 seventh-round selection and C Juice Scruggs to Detroit in exchange for RB David Montgomery. Detroit → NY Jets (D). See Round 2: NY Jets → Detroit. NY Jets → Cincinnati (D). See Round 4: Cincinnati → NY Jets.) |
| 4 | 129 | Carolina Panthers | Will Lee III | CB | Texas A&M | from LA Rams via Chicago (Note: No. 129: LA Rams → Chicago → Carolina. Multiple trades: LA Rams → Chicago (PD). The LA Rams traded a fourth-round selection (129th overall) and a 2025 sixth-round selection to Chicago in exchange for a 2025 fifth-round selection. Chicago → Carolina (D). See Round 4: Carolina → Chicago.) |
| 4 | 130 | Miami Dolphins | Trey Moore | DE | Texas | from Denver (Note: No. 130: Denver → Miami (PD). See Round 1: Denver → Miami.) |
| 4 | 131 | Los Angeles Chargers | Genesis Smith | S | Arizona | from New England (Note: No. 131: New England → LA Chargers (D). See Round 2: LA Chargers → New England.) |
| 4 | 132 | New Orleans Saints | Jeremiah Wright | G | Auburn | from Seattle (Note: No. 132: Seattle → New Orleans (PD). Seattle traded fourth- and fifth-round selections (132nd and 172nd overall) to New Orleans in exchange for WR/RS Rashid Shaheed.) |
| 4* | 133 | Baltimore Ravens | Matthew Hibner | TE | SMU | from San Francisco (Note: No. 133: San Francisco → Baltimore (D). San Francisco traded a fourth-round selection (133rd overall) to Baltimore in exchange for a fifth-round selection (154th overall) and a 2027 sixth-round selection.) |
| 4* | 134 | Atlanta Falcons | Kendal Daniels | LB | Oklahoma | from Las Vegas (Note: No. 134: Las Vegas → Atlanta (D). See Round 4: Atlanta → Las Vegas.) |
| 4* | 135 | Indianapolis Colts | Bryce Boettcher | LB | Oregon | 2024 Burlsworth Trophy winner; from Pittsburgh (Note: No. 135: Pittsburgh → Indianapolis (D). See Round 2: Indianapolis → Pittsburgh.) |
| 4* | 136 | New Orleans Saints | Bryce Lance | WR | North Dakota State | |
| 4* | 137 | Dallas Cowboys | LT Overton | DT | Alabama | from Philadelphia (Note: No. 137: Philadelphia → Dallas (D). See Round 1: Philadelphia → Dallas.) |
| 4* | 138 | Miami Dolphins | Kyle Louis | LB | Pittsburgh | from San Francisco (Note: No. 138: San Francisco → Miami (D). See Round 1: San Francisco → Miami.) |
| 4* | 139 | San Francisco 49ers | Ephesians Prysock | CB | Washington | |
| 4* | 140 | Cincinnati Bengals | Colbie Young | WR | Georgia | from NY Jets (Note: No. 140: NY Jets → Cincinnati (D). See Round 4: Cincinnati → NY Jets.) |
| 5 | 141 | Houston Texans | Kamari Ramsey | S | USC | from Las Vegas and Cleveland (Note: No. 141: Las Vegas → Cleveland → Houston. Multiple trades: Las Vegas → Cleveland (PD). Las Vegas traded a fifth-round selection (141st overall) to Cleveland in exchange for QB Kenny Pickett. Cleveland → Houston (PD). Cleveland traded a fifth-round selection (141st overall) to Houston in exchange for OT Tytus Howard.) |
| 5 | 142 | Tennessee Titans | Fernando Carmona | G | Arkansas | from NY Jets via Baltimore (Note: No. 142: NY Jets → Baltimore → Tennessee. Multiple trades: NY Jets → Baltimore (PD). The NY Jets traded a fifth-round selection (142nd overall) and a 2025 sixth-round selection to Baltimore in exchange for a sixth-round selection (194th overall) and a 2025 fifth-round selection. Baltimore → Tennessee (PD). Baltimore traded a conditional fifth-round selection (142nd overall) to Tennessee in exchange for DE Dre'Mont Jones. This selection would have become a fourth-round selection if Baltimore made the playoffs and Jones logged at least two sacks in 2025, but this condition was not met.) |
| 5 | 143 | Arizona Cardinals | Reggie Virgil | WR | Texas Tech | |
| 5 | 144 | Carolina Panthers | Sam Hecht | C | Kansas State | from Tennessee via LA Rams, Tennessee, and Chicago (Note: No. 144: Tennessee → LA Rams → Tennessee → Chicago → Carolina. Multiple trades: Tennessee → LA Rams (PD). Tennessee traded a fifth-round selection (144th overall) to the LA Rams in exchange for a sixth-round selection (207th overall) and LB Ernest Jones. LA Rams → Tennessee (PD). The LA Rams traded a conditional fifth-round selection (144th overall) to Tennessee in exchange for a conditional sixth-round selection (207th overall) and CB Roger McCreary. Tennessee → Chicago (D). See Round 2: Chicago → Tennessee. Chicago → Carolina (D). See Round 4: Carolina → Chicago.) |
| 5 | 145 | Los Angeles Chargers | Nick Barrett | DT | South Carolina | from NY Giants via Cleveland (Note: No. 145: NY Giants → Cleveland → LA Chargers. Multiple trades: NY Giants → Cleveland (D). See Round 3: Cleveland → NY Giants. Cleveland → LA Chargers (D). See Round 3: LA Chargers → Cleveland.) |
| 5 | 146 | Cleveland Browns | Parker Brailsford | C | Alabama | |
| 5 | 147 | Washington Commanders | Joshua Josephs | DE | Tennessee | |
| 5 | 148 | Seattle Seahawks | Beau Stephens | G | Iowa | from Kansas City via Cleveland (Note: No. 148: Kansas City → Cleveland → Seattle. Multiple trades: Kansas City → Cleveland (D). See Round 1: Cleveland → Kansas City. Cleveland → Seattle (D). Cleveland traded a fifth-round selection (148th overall) to Seattle in exchange for a 2027 fourth-round selection.) |
| 5 | 149 | Cleveland Browns | Justin Jefferson | LB | Alabama | from Cincinnati (Note: No. 149: Cincinnati → Cleveland (PD). Cincinnati traded a fifth-round selection (149th overall) to Cleveland in exchange for a sixth-round selection (199th overall) and QB Joe Flacco.) |
| 5 | 150 | Las Vegas Raiders | Dalton Johnson | S | Arizona | from New Orleans (Note: No. 150: New Orleans → Las Vegas (D). New Orleans traded a fifth-round selection (150th overall) to Las Vegas in exchange for a seventh-round selection (219th overall) and DE Tyree Wilson.) |
| 5 | 151 | Carolina Panthers | Zakee Wheatley | S | Penn State | from Miami (Note: No. 151: Miami → Carolina (D). Miami traded fifth- and seventh-round selections (151st and 227th overall) to Carolina in exchange for fifth- and sixth-round selections (158th and 200th overall).) |
| 5 | 152 | Denver Broncos | Justin Joly | TE | NC State | from Dallas via San Francisco and Cleveland (Note: No. 152: Dallas → San Francisco → Cleveland → Denver. Multiple trades: Dallas → San Francisco (D). Dallas traded a fifth-round selection (152nd overall) to San Francisco in exchange for LB Dee Winters. San Francisco → Cleveland (D). See Round 2: San Francisco → Cleveland. Cleveland → Denver (D). Cleveland traded a fifth-round selection (152nd overall) to Denver in exchange for fifth- and sixth-round selections (170th and 182nd overall).) |
| 5 | 153 | Green Bay Packers | Jager Burton | C | Kentucky | from Atlanta via Philadelphia (Note: No. 153: Atlanta → Philadelphia → Green Bay. Multiple trades: Atlanta → Philadelphia (PD). Atlanta traded a fifth-round selection (153rd overall) and a 2025 third-round selection to Philadelphia in exchange for a 2025 third-round selection. Philadelphia → Green Bay (PD). Philadelphia traded a fifth-round selection (153rd overall) and a 2027 sixth-round selection to Green Bay in exchange for WR Dontayvion Wicks.) |
| 5 | 154 | San Francisco 49ers | Jaden Dugger | LB | Louisiana | from Baltimore (Note: No. 154: Baltimore → San Francisco (D). See Round 4: San Francisco → Baltimore.) |
| 5 | 155 | Tampa Bay Buccaneers | DeMonte Capehart | DT | Clemson | |
| 5 | 156 | Indianapolis Colts | George Gumbs Jr. | DE | Florida | |
| 5 | 157 | Detroit Lions | Keith Abney II | CB | Arizona State | |
| 5 | 158 | Miami Dolphins | Michael Taaffe | S | Texas | 2025 Wuerffel Trophy winner; from Minnesota via Carolina (Note: No. 158: Minnesota → Carolina → Miami. Multiple trades: Minnesota → Carolina (PD). Minnesota traded a fifth-round selection (158th overall) and a 2027 fourth-round selection to Carolina in exchange for a conditional seventh-round selection (235th overall), a 2027 fifth-round selection and WR Adam Thielen. Carolina → Miami (D). See Round 5: Miami → Carolina.) |
| 5 | 159 | Minnesota Vikings | Max Bredeson | FB | Michigan | from Carolina (Note: No. 159: Carolina → Minnesota (D). See Round 2: Minnesota → Carolina.) |
| 5 | 160 | Tampa Bay Buccaneers | Billy Schrauth | G | Notre Dame | from Green Bay (Note: No. 160: Green Bay → Tampa Bay (D). See Round 3: Tampa Bay → Green Bay.) |
| 5 | 161 | Kansas City Chiefs | Emmett Johnson | RB | Nebraska | from Pittsburgh (Note: No. 161: Pittsburgh → Kansas City (D). Pittsburgh traded fifth- and seventh-round selections (161st and 249th overall) to Kansas City in exchange for fifth- and sixth-round selections (169th and 210th overall).) |
| 5 | 162 | Baltimore Ravens | Chandler Rivers | CB | Duke | from LA Chargers (Note: No. 162: LA Chargers → Baltimore (PD). LA Chargers traded a fifth-round selection (162nd overall) and S Alohi Gilman to Baltimore in exchange for a 2027 seventh-round selection and LB Odafe Oweh.) |
| 5 | 163 | Minnesota Vikings | Charles Demmings | CB | Stephen F. Austin | from Philadelphia (Note: No. 163: Philadelphia → Minnesota (PD). Philadelphia traded a fifth-round selection (163rd overall) and a 2027 seventh-round selection to Minnesota in exchange for a sixth-round selection (211th overall) and QB Sam Howell.) |
| 5 | 164 | Jacksonville Jaguars | Tanner Koziol | TE | Houston | |
| 5 | 165 | Tennessee Titans | Nicholas Singleton | RB | Penn State | from Chicago via Buffalo (Note: No. 165: Chicago → Buffalo → Tennessee. Multiple trades: Chicago → Buffalo (PD). See Round 2: Buffalo → Chicago. Buffalo → Tennessee (D). See Round 1: Buffalo → Tennessee.) |
| 5 | 166 | Chicago Bears | Keyshaun Elliott | LB | Arizona State | from San Francisco via Philadelphia, Jacksonville and Carolina (Note: No. 166: San Francisco → Philadelphia → Jacksonville → Carolina → Chicago. Multiple trades: San Francisco → Philadelphia (PD). San Francisco traded a conditional fifth-round selection (166th overall) to Philadelphia in exchange for DE Bryce Huff. This selection would have become a fourth-round selection if Huff recorded eight sacks in 2025, but this condition was not met. Philadelphia → Jacksonville (PD). Philadelphia traded fifth- and sixth-round selections (166th and 203rd overall) to Jacksonville in exchange for RB/KR Tank Bigsby. Jacksonville → Carolina (D). See Round 4: Carolina → Jacksonville. Carolina → Chicago (D). See Round 4: Carolina → Chicago.) |
| 5 | 167 | Buffalo Bills | Jalon Kilgore | S | South Carolina | from Houston via Philadelphia via Houston (Note: No. 167: Houston → Philadelphia → Houston → Buffalo. Multiple trades: Houston → Philadelphia (PD). Houston traded a fifth-round selection (167th overall) and G Kenyon Green to Philadelphia in exchange for a sixth-round selection (203rd overall) and S C. J. Gardner-Johnson. Philadelphia → Houston (PD). Philadelphia traded a fifth-round selection (167th overall) and TE Harrison Bryant to Houston in exchange for a sixth-round selection (203rd overall) and WR John Metchie III. Houston → Buffalo (D). See Round 1: Buffalo → Houston.) |
| 5 | 168 | Detroit Lions | Kendrick Law | WR | Kentucky | from Buffalo (Note: No. 168: Buffalo → Detroit (D). Buffalo traded a fifth-round selection (168th overall) to Detroit in exchange for fifth- and sixth-round selections (181st and 213th overall).) |
| 5 | 169 | Pittsburgh Steelers | Riley Nowakowski | TE | Indiana | from LA Rams via Kansas City (Note: No. 169: LA Rams → Kansas City → Pittsburgh. Multiple trades: LA Rams → Kansas City (PD). See Round 1: LA Rams → Kansas City. Kansas City → Pittsburgh (D). See Round 5: Pittsburgh → Kansas City.) |
| 5 | 170 | Cleveland Browns | Joe Royer | TE | Cincinnati | from Denver (Note: No. 170: Denver → Cleveland (D). See Round 5: Cleveland → Denver.) |
| 5 | 171 | New England Patriots | Karon Prunty | CB | Wake Forest | |
| 5 | 172 | New Orleans Saints | Lorenzo Styles Jr. | S | Ohio State | from Seattle (Note: No. 172: Seattle → New Orleans (PD). See Round 4: Seattle → New Orleans.) |
| 5* | 173 | Baltimore Ravens | Josh Cuevas | TE | Alabama | |
| 5* | 174 | Baltimore Ravens | Adam Randall | RB | Clemson | |
| 5* | 175 | Las Vegas Raiders | Hezekiah Masses | CB | California | |
| 5* | 176 | Kansas City Chiefs | Cyrus Allen | WR | Cincinnati | |
| 5* | 177 | Miami Dolphins | Kevin Coleman Jr. | WR | Missouri | from Dallas (Note: No. 177: Dallas → Miami (D). See Round 1: Miami → Dallas.) |
| 5* | 178 | Philadelphia Eagles | Cole Payton | QB | North Dakota State | |
| 5* | 179 | San Francisco 49ers | Enrique Cruz Jr. | T | Kansas | from NY Jets (Note: No. 179: NY Jets → San Francisco (D). See Round 1: San Francisco → NY Jets.) |
| 5* | 180 | Miami Dolphins | Seydou Traore | TE | Mississippi State | from Dallas (Note: No. 180: Dallas → Miami (D). See Round 1: Miami → Dallas.) |
| 5* | 181 | Buffalo Bills | Zane Durant | DT | Penn State | from Detroit (Note: No. 181: Detroit → Buffalo (D). See Round 5: Buffalo → Detroit.) |
| 6 | 182 | Cleveland Browns | Taylen Green | QB | Arkansas | from NY Jets via Cleveland, Jacksonville, Las Vegas, Buffalo and Denver (Note: No. 182: NY Jets → Cleveland → Jacksonville → Las Vegas → Buffalo → Denver. Multiple trades: NY Jets → Cleveland (PD). The NY Jets traded a sixth-round selection (182nd overall) to Cleveland in exchange for a seventh-round selection (242nd overall) and DT Jowon Briggs. Cleveland → Jacksonville (PD). Cleveland traded a sixth-round selection (182nd overall) and CB Greg Newsome II to Jacksonville in exchange for a seventh-round selection (239th overall) and CB Tyson Campbell. Jacksonville → Las Vegas (PD). See Round 4: Jacksonville → Las Vegas. Las Vegas → Buffalo (PD). Las Vegas traded a sixth-round selection (182nd overall) to Buffalo in exchange for a seventh-round selection (228th overall) and CB Taron Johnson. Buffalo → Denver (D). See Round 2: Denver → Buffalo. Denver → Cleveland (D). See Round 5: Cleveland → Denver.) |
| 6 | 183 | Arizona Cardinals | Karson Sharar | LB | Iowa | |
| 6 | 184 | Tennessee Titans | Jackie Marshall | DT | Baylor | |
| 6 | 185 | Tampa Bay Buccaneers | Bauer Sharp | TE | LSU | from Las Vegas (Note: No. 185: Las Vegas → Tampa Bay (D). Las Vegas traded a sixth-round selection (185th overall) to Tampa Bay in exchange for sixth- and seventh-round selections (195th and 229th overall).) |
| 6 | 186 | New York Giants | Bobby Jamison-Travis | DT | Auburn | |
| 6 | 187 | Washington Commanders | Kaytron Allen | RB | Penn State | |
| 6 | 188 | New York Jets | Anez Cooper | G | Miami (FL) | from Cleveland via Seattle (Note: No. 188: Cleveland → Seattle → NY Jets. Multiple trades: Cleveland → Seattle (PD). Cleveland traded a sixth-round selection (188th overall) to Seattle in exchange for a seventh-round selection (248th overall) and C Nick Harris. Seattle → NY Jets (D). Seattle traded a sixth-round selection (188th overall) to the NY Jets in exchange for sixth- and seventh-round selections (199th and 242nd overall).) |
| 6 | 189 | Cincinnati Bengals | Brian Parker II | C | Duke | |
| 6 | 190 | New Orleans Saints | Barion Brown | WR | LSU | |
| 6 | 191 | Jacksonville Jaguars | Josh Cameron | WR | Baylor | from Kansas City via New England (Note: No. 191: Kansas City → New England → Jacksonville. Multiple trades: Kansas City → New England (PD). Kansas City traded a sixth-round selection (191st overall) to New England in exchange for LB Joshua Uche. New England → Jacksonville (D). New England traded a sixth-round selection (191st overall) to Jacksonville in exchange for sixth- and seventh-round selections (196th and 245th overall).) |
| 6 | 192 | New York Giants | J. C. Davis | T | Illinois | from Miami (Note: No. 192: Miami → NY Giants (PD). Miami traded a sixth-round selection (192nd overall) to the NY Giants in exchange for a conditional 2027 seventh-round selection and TE Darren Waller.) |
| 6 | 193 | New York Giants | Jack Kelly | LB | BYU | from Dallas (Note: No. 193: Dallas → NY Giants (PD). Dallas traded a sixth-round selection (193rd overall) to the NY Giants in exchange for a seventh-round selection (221st overall) and DL Jordan Phillips.) |
| 6 | 194 | Tennessee Titans | Pat Coogan | C | Indiana | from Baltimore via NY Jets (Note: No. 194: Baltimore → NY Jets → Tennessee. Multiple trades: Baltimore → NY Jets (PD). See Round 5: NY Jets → Baltimore. NY Jets → Tennessee (PD). The NY Jets traded a sixth-round selection (194th overall) to Tennessee in exchange for a seventh-round selection (238th overall) and CB Jarvis Brownlee Jr.) |
| 6 | 195 | Las Vegas Raiders | Malik Benson | WR | Oregon | from Tampa Bay (Note: No. 195: Tampa Bay → Las Vegas (D). See Round 6: Las Vegas → Tampa Bay.) |
| 6 | 196 | New England Patriots | Dametrious Crownover | T | Texas A&M | from Indianapolis via Minnesota, Carolina and Jacksonville (Note: No. 196: Indianapolis → Minnesota → Carolina → Jacksonville → New England. Multiple trades: Indianapolis → Minnesota (PD). Indianapolis traded a sixth-round selection (196th overall) to Minnesota in exchange for CB Mekhi Blackmon. Minnesota → Carolina (D). See Round 2: Minnesota → Carolina. Carolina → Jacksonville (D). See Round 4: Carolina → Jacksonville. Jacksonville → New England (D). See Round 6: New England → Jacksonville.) |
| 6 | 197 | Los Angeles Rams | CJ Daniels | WR | Miami (FL) | from Atlanta via Philadelphia (Note: No. 197: Atlanta → Philadelphia → LA Rams. Multiple trades: Atlanta → Philadelphia (PD). See Round 4: Atlanta → Philadelphia. Philadelphia → LA Rams (D). Philadelphia traded a sixth-round selection (197th overall) to the LA Rams in exchange for a sixth- and two seventh-round selections (207th, 251st and 252nd overall).) |
| 6 | 198 | Minnesota Vikings | Demond Claiborne | RB | Wake Forest | from Minnesota via Houston, Minnesota, San Francisco and New England (Note: No. 198: Minnesota → Houston → Minnesota → San Francisco → New England. Multiple trades: Minnesota → Houston (PD). Minnesota traded a conditional sixth-round selection (198th overall) to Houston in exchange for a conditional seventh-round selection (244th overall) and RB Cam Akers. Houston → Minnesota (PD). Houston traded a sixth-round selection (198th overall) to Minnesota in exchange for G Ed Ingram. Minnesota → San Francisco (PD). Minnesota traded a sixth-round selection (198th overall) and a 2025 fifth-round selection to San Francisco in exchange for a 2025 sixth-round selection and RB Jordan Mason. San Francisco → New England (PD). San Francisco traded a sixth-round selection (198th overall) to New England in exchange for a conditional seventh-round selection and DE Keion White. The condition – which would return the seventh-round selection to New England if White was active for seven games – was met on December 22, 2025. New England → Minnesota (D). New England traded a sixth-round selection (198th overall) to Minnesota in exchange for a seventh-round selection (234th overall) and a 2027 sixth-round selection.) |
| 6 | 199 | Seattle Seahawks | Emmanuel Henderson | WR | Kansas | from Detroit via Cleveland, Cincinnati and NY Jets (Note: No. 199: Detroit → Cleveland → Cincinnati → NY Jets → Seattle. Multiple trades: Detroit → Cleveland (PD). Detroit traded a sixth-round selection (199th overall) and a 2025 fifth-round selection to Cleveland in exchange for a seventh-round selection (222nd overall) and DE Za'Darius Smith. Cleveland → Cincinnati (PD). See Round 5: Cincinnati → Cleveland. Cincinnati → NY Jets (D). See Round 4: Cincinnati → NY Jets. NY Jets → Seattle (D). See Round 6: Seattle → NY Jets.) |
| 6 | 200 | Miami Dolphins | DJ Campbell | G | Texas | from Carolina (Note: No. 200: Carolina → Miami (D). See Round 5: Miami → Carolina.) |
| 6 | 201 | Green Bay Packers | Domani Jackson | CB | Alabama | |
| 6 | 202 | Los Angeles Chargers | Logan Taylor | G | Boston College | from Pittsburgh via New England (Note: No. 202: Pittsburgh → New England → LA Chargers. Multiple trades: Pittsburgh → New England (PD). Pittsburgh traded a sixth-round selection (202nd overall) to New England in exchange for a seventh-round selection (224th overall) and S Kyle Dugger. New England → LA Chargers (D). See Round 2: LA Chargers → New England.) |
| 6 | 203 | Jacksonville Jaguars | CJ Williams | WR | Stanford | from Philadelphia via Houston and Philadelphia (Note: No. 203: Philadelphia → Houston → Philadelphia → Jacksonville. Multiple trades: Philadelphia → Houston (PD). See Round 5: Houston → Philadelphia. Houston → Philadelphia (PD). See Round 5: Philadelphia → Houston. Philadelphia → Jacksonville (PD). See Round 5: Philadelphia → Jacksonville.) |
| 6 | 204 | Houston Texans | Lewis Bond | WR | Boston College | from LA Chargers (Note: No. 204: LA Chargers → Houston (D). See Round 4: Houston → LA Chargers.) |
| 6 | 205 | Detroit Lions | Skyler Gill-Howard | DT | Texas Tech | from Jacksonville (Note: No. 205: Jacksonville → Detroit (PD). Jacksonville traded a sixth-round selection (205th overall) to Detroit in exchange for WR Tim Patrick.) |
| 6 | 206 | Los Angeles Chargers | Alex Harkey | G | Oregon | from Chicago via Cleveland (Note: No. 206: Chicago → Cleveland → LA Chargers. Multiple trades: Chicago → Cleveland (PD). Chicago traded a sixth-round selection (206th overall) to Cleveland in exchange for a seventh-round selection (239th overall) and DE Joe Tryon-Shoyinka. Cleveland → LA Chargers (D). See Round 3: LA Chargers → Cleveland.) |
| 6 | 207 | Philadelphia Eagles | Micah Morris | G | Georgia | from LA Rams via Houston and Tennessee (Note: No. 207: Houston → LA Rams → Tennessee → LA Rams → Philadelphia. Multiple trades: Houston → LA Rams (PD). Houston traded a sixth-round selection (207th overall) to the LA Rams in exchange for a seventh-round selection (245th overall) and WR Ben Skowronek. LA Rams → Tennessee (PD). See Round 5: Tennessee → LA Rams. Tennessee → LA Rams (PD). See Round 5: LA Rams → Tennessee. LA Rams → Philadelphia (D). See Round 6: Philadelphia → LA Rams.) |
| 6 | 208 | Atlanta Falcons | Anterio Thompson | DT | Washington | from Buffalo and NY Jets (Note: No. 208: Buffalo → NY Jets → Las Vegas → Atlanta. Multiple trades: Buffalo → NY Jets (PD). Buffalo traded a sixth-round selection (208th overall) to the NY Jets in exchange for a seventh-round selection (220th overall) and CB Brandon Codrington. NY Jets → Las Vegas (PD). The NY Jets traded a sixth-round selection (208th overall) to Las Vegas in exchange for a seventh-round selection (228th overall) and QB Geno Smith. Las Vegas → Atlanta (D). See Round 4: Atlanta → Las Vegas.) |
| 6 | 209 | Washington Commanders | Matt Gulbin | C | Michigan State | from San Francisco (Note: No. 209: San Francisco → Washington (PD). San Francisco traded a sixth-round selection (209th overall) to Washington in exchange for RB Brian Robinson Jr.) |
| 6 | 210 | Pittsburgh Steelers | Gabriel Rubio | DT | Notre Dame | from LA Rams via Kansas City (Note: No. 210: LA Rams → Kansas City → Pittsburgh. Multiple trades: LA Rams → Kansas City (PD). See Round 1: LA Rams → Kansas City. Kansas City → Pittsburgh (D). See Round 5: Pittsburgh → Kansas City.) |
| 6 | 211 | Baltimore Ravens | Ryan Eckley | P | Michigan State | from Denver via NY Jets, Minnesota and Philadelphia (Note: No. 211: Denver → NY Jets → Minnesota → Philadelphia → Baltimore. Multiple trades: Denver → NY Jets (PD). Denver traded a sixth-round selection (211th overall) to the NY Jets in exchange for DL John Franklin-Myers. NY Jets → Minnesota (PD). The NY Jets traded a sixth-round selection (211th overall) and a 2027 sixth-round selection to Minnesota in exchange for a 2027 seventh-round selection and DT Harrison Phillips. Minnesota → Philadelphia (PD). See Round 5: Philadelphia → Minnesota. Philadelphia → Baltimore (PD). Philadelphia traded a sixth-round selection (211th overall) to Baltimore in exchange for a 2027 seventh-round selection and CB Jaire Alexander.) |
| 6 | 212 | New England Patriots | Namdi Obiazor | LB | TCU | |
| 6 | 213 | Chicago Bears | Jordan van den Berg | DT | Georgia Tech | from Seattle via Jacksonville, Detroit and Buffalo (Note: No. 213: Seattle → Jacksonville → Detroit. Multiple trades: Seattle → Jacksonville (PD). Seattle traded a sixth-round selection (213th overall) to Jacksonville in exchange for DT Roy Robertson-Harris. Jacksonville → Detroit (PD). See Round 3: Detroit → Jacksonville. Detroit → Buffalo (D). See Round 5: Buffalo → Detroit. Buffalo → Chicago (D). Buffalo traded a sixth-round selection (213th overall) to Chicago in exchange for two seventh-round selections (239th and 241st overall).) |
| 6* | 214 | Indianapolis Colts | Caden Curry | DE | Ohio State | from Pittsburgh (Note: No. 214: Pittsburgh → Indianapolis (PD). Pittsburgh traded a sixth-round selection (214th overall) to Indianapolis in exchange for a seventh-round selection (230th overall) and WR Michael Pittman Jr.) |
| 6* | 215 | Atlanta Falcons | Harold Perkins Jr. | LB | LSU | from Philadelphia (Note: No. 215: Philadelphia → Atlanta (PD). See Round 4: Atlanta → Philadelphia.) |
| 6* | 216 | Green Bay Packers | Trey Smack | K | Florida | from Pittsburgh via Seattle (Note: No. 216: Pittsburgh → Seattle → Green Bay. Multiple trades: Pittsburgh → Seattle (D). See Round 3: Seattle → Pittsburgh. Seattle → Green Bay (D). Seattle traded a sixth-round selection (216th overall) to Green Bay in exchange for two seventh-round selections (236th and 255th overall).) |
| 7 | 217 | Arizona Cardinals | Jayden Williams | T | Ole Miss | |
| 7 | 218 | Dallas Cowboys | Anthony Smith | WR | East Carolina | from Tennessee (Note: No. 218: Tennessee → Dallas (PD). Tennessee traded a seventh-round selection (218th overall) to Dallas in exchange for a seventh-round selection (225th overall) and DT Solomon Thomas.) |
| 7 | 219 | New Orleans Saints | TJ Hall | CB | Iowa | from Las Vegas (Note: No. 219: Las Vegas → New Orleans (D). See Round 5: New Orleans → Las Vegas.) |
| 7 | 220 | Buffalo Bills | Toriano Pride Jr. | CB | Missouri | from NY Jets (Note: No. 220: NY Jets → Buffalo (PD). See Round 6: Buffalo → NY Jets.) |
| 7 | 221 | Cincinnati Bengals | Jack Endries | TE | Texas | from NY Giants via Dallas (Note: No. 221: NY Giants → Dallas → Cincinnati. Multiple trades: NY Giants → Dallas (PD). See Round 6: Dallas → NY Giants. Dallas → Cincinnati (PD). Dallas traded a seventh-round selection (221st overall) to Cincinnati in exchange for LB Logan Wilson.) |
| 7 | 222 | Detroit Lions | Tyre West | DE | Tennessee | from Cleveland (Note: No. 222: Cleveland → Detroit (PD). See Round 6: Detroit → Cleveland.) |
| 7 | 223 | Washington Commanders | Athan Kaliakmanis | QB | Rutgers | |
| 7 | 224 | Pittsburgh Steelers | Robert Spears-Jennings | S | Oklahoma | from New Orleans via New England (Note: No. 224: New Orleans → New England → Pittsburgh. Multiple trades: New Orleans → New England (PD). New Orleans traded a seventh-round selection (224th overall) to New England in exchange for DT Davon Godchaux. New England → Pittsburgh (PD). See Round 6: Pittsburgh → New England.) |
| 7 | 225 | Tennessee Titans | Jaren Kanak | TE | Oklahoma | from Kansas City via Dallas (Note: No. 225: Kansas City → Dallas → Tennessee. Multiple trades: Kansas City → Dallas (PD). Kansas City traded a conditional seventh-round selection (225th overall) to Dallas in exchange for TE Peyton Hendershot. Dallas → Tennessee (PD). See Round 7: Tennessee → Dallas.) |
| 7 | 226 | Cincinnati Bengals | Landon Robinson | DT | Navy | |
| 7 | 227 | Carolina Panthers | Jackson Kuwatch | LB | Miami (OH) | from Miami (Note: No. 227: Miami → Carolina (D). See Round 5: Miami → Carolina.) |
| 7 | 228 | New York Jets | VJ Payne | S | Kansas State | from Dallas via Buffalo and Las Vegas (Note: No. 228: Dallas → Buffalo → Las Vegas → NY Jets. Multiple trades: Dallas → Buffalo (PD). Dallas traded a seventh-round selection (228th overall) and a 2025 fifth-round selection to Buffalo in exchange for a 2025 sixth-round selection and CB Kaiir Elam. Buffalo → Las Vegas (PD). See Round 6: Las Vegas → Buffalo. Las Vegas → NY Jets (PD). See Round 6: NY Jets → Las Vegas.) |
| 7 | 229 | Las Vegas Raiders | Brandon Cleveland | DT | NC State | from Tampa Bay (Note: No. 229: Tampa Bay → Las Vegas (D). See Round 6: Las Vegas → Tampa Bay.) |
| 7 | 230 | Pittsburgh Steelers | Eli Heidenreich | RB | Navy | from Indianapolis (Note: No. 230: Indianapolis → Pittsburgh (PD). See Round 6: Pittsburgh → Indianapolis.) |
| 7 | 231 | Atlanta Falcons | Ethan Onianwa | T | Ohio State | |
| 7 | 232 | Los Angeles Rams | Tim Keenan III | DT | Alabama | from Baltimore (Note: No. 232: Baltimore → LA Rams (PD). Baltimore traded a seventh-round selection (232nd overall) to the LA Rams in exchange for a 2027 seventh-round selection and CB Tre'Davious White.) |
| 7 | 233 | Jacksonville Jaguars | Zach Durfee | DE | Washington | from Detroit (Note: No. 233: Detroit → Jacksonville (PD). Detroit traded a conditional seventh-round selection (233rd overall) to Jacksonville in exchange for K Riley Patterson.) |
| 7 | 234 | New England Patriots | Behren Morton | QB | Texas Tech | from Minnesota (Note: No. 234: Minnesota → New England (D). See Round 6: New England → Minnesota.) |
| 7 | 235 | Minnesota Vikings | Gavin Gerhardt | C | Cincinnati | from Carolina (Note: No. 235: Carolina → Minnesota (PD). See Round 5: Minnesota → Carolina.) |
| 7 | 236 | Seattle Seahawks | Andre Fuller | CB | Toledo | from Green Bay (Note: No. 236: Green Bay → Seattle (D). See Round 6: Seattle → Green Bay.) |
| 7 | 237 | Indianapolis Colts | Seth McGowan | RB | Kentucky | from Pittsburgh (Note: No. 237: Pittsburgh → Indianapolis (D). See Round 2: Indianapolis → Pittsburgh.) |
| 7 | 238 | Miami Dolphins | Max Llewellyn | DE | Iowa | from LA Chargers via Tennessee and NY Jets (Note: No. 238: LA Chargers → Tennessee → NY Jets → Miami. Multiple trades: LA Chargers → Tennessee (PD). The LA Chargers traded a seventh-round selection (238th overall) to Tennessee in exchange for S Elijah Molden. Tennessee → NY Jets (PD). See Round 6: NY Jets → Tennessee. NY Jets → Miami (PD). The NY Jets traded a seventh-round selection (238th overall) to Miami in exchange for S Minkah Fitzpatrick.) |
| 7 | 239 | Buffalo Bills | Tommy Doman | P | Florida | from Philadelphia via Jacksonville, Cleveland and Chicago (Note: No. 239: Philadelphia → Jacksonville → Cleveland → Chicago → Buffalo. Multiple trades: Philadelphia → Jacksonville (PD). Philadelphia traded a seventh-round selection (239th overall) to Jacksonville in exchange for T Fred Johnson. Jacksonville → Cleveland (PD). See Round 6: Cleveland → Jacksonville. Cleveland → Chicago (PD). See Round 6: Chicago → Cleveland. Chicago → Buffalo (D). See Round 6: Buffalo → Chicago.) |
| 7 | 240 | Jacksonville Jaguars | Parker Hughes | LB | Middle Tennessee | |
| 7 | 241 | Buffalo Bills | Ar'maj Reed-Adams | G | Texas A&M | from Chicago (Note: No. 241: Chicago → Buffalo (D). See Round 6: Buffalo → Chicago.) |
| 7 | 242 | Seattle Seahawks | Deven Eastern | DT | Minnesota | from Buffalo via Cleveland and NY Jets (Note: No. 242: Buffalo → Cleveland → NY Jets → Seattle. Multiple trades: Buffalo → Cleveland (PD). Buffalo traded a seventh-round selection (242nd overall) and a 2025 third-round selection to Cleveland in exchange for a 2025 sixth-round selection and WR Amari Cooper. Cleveland → NY Jets (PD). See Round 6: NY Jets → Cleveland. NY Jets → Seattle (D). See Round 6: Seattle → NY Jets.) |
| 7 | 243 | Houston Texans | Aiden Fisher | LB | Indiana | from San Francisco (Note: No. 243: San Francisco → Houston (PD). San Francisco traded a seventh-round selection (243rd overall) to Houston in exchange for DT Khalil Davis.) |
| 7 | 244 | Philadelphia Eagles | Cole Wisniewski | S | Texas Tech | from Houston via Minnesota (Note: No. 244: Houston → Minnesota → Philadelphia. Multiple trades: Houston → Minnesota (PD). See Round 6: Houston → Minnesota. Minnesota → Philadelphia (D). See Round 3: Philadelphia → Minnesota.) |
| 7 | 245 | New England Patriots | Jam Miller | RB | Alabama | from LA Rams via Houston and Jacksonville (Note: No. 245: LA Rams → Houston → Jacksonville → New England. Multiple trades: LA Rams → Houston (PD). See Round 6: Houston → LA Rams. Houston → Jacksonville (PD). Houston traded a seventh-round selection (245th overall) to Jacksonville in exchange for WR Christian Kirk. Jacksonville → New England (D). See Round 6: New England → Jacksonville.) |
| 7 | 246 | Denver Broncos | Miles Scott | S | Illinois | |
| 7 | 247 | New England Patriots | Quintayvious Hutchins | DE | Boston College | |
| 7 | 248 | Cleveland Browns | Carsen Ryan | TE | BYU | from Seattle (Note: No. 248: Seattle → Cleveland (PD). See Round 6: Cleveland → Seattle.) |
| 7* | 249 | Kansas City Chiefs | Garrett Nussmeier | QB | LSU | from Indianapolis via Pittsburgh (Note: No. 249: Indianapolis → Pittsburgh → Kansas City. Multiple trades: Indianapolis → Pittsburgh (D). See Round 2: Indianapolis → Pittsburgh. Pittsburgh → Kansas City (D). See Round 5: Pittsburgh → Kansas City.) |
| 7* | 250 | Baltimore Ravens | Rayshaun Benny | DT | Michigan | |
| 7* | 251 | Philadelphia Eagles | Uar Bernard | DT | | from LA Rams (Note: No. 251: LA Rams → Philadelphia (D). See Round 6: Philadelphia → LA Rams.); International Player Pathway program participant |
| 7* | 252 | Philadelphia Eagles | Keyshawn James-Newby | DE | New Mexico | from LA Rams (Note: No. 252: LA Rams → Philadelphia (D). See Round 6: Philadelphia → LA Rams.) |
| 7* | 253 | Baltimore Ravens | Evan Beerntsen | G | Northwestern | |
| 7* | 254 | Indianapolis Colts | Deion Burks | WR | Oklahoma | |
| 7* | 255 | Seattle Seahawks | Michael Dansby | CB | Arizona | from Green Bay (Note: No. 255: Green Bay → Seattle (D). See Round 6: Seattle → Green Bay.) |
| 7* | 256 | Denver Broncos | Dallen Bentley | TE | Utah | |
| 7* | 257 | Denver Broncos | Red Murdock | LB | Buffalo | Mr. Irrelevant |

== Notable undrafted players ==
| Original NFL team | Player | Pos. | College | Notes |
|---|---|---|---|---|
| Arizona Cardinals | Harrison Wallace III | WR | Ole Miss | |
| Arizona Cardinals | Wydett Williams | FS | Ole Miss | |
| Atlanta Falcons | Jack Strand | QB | Minnesota State–Moorhead | |
| Baltimore Ravens | Ethan Burke | OLB | Texas | |
| Baltimore Ravens | Joe Fagnano | QB | UConn | |
| Baltimore Ravens | Diego Pavia | QB | Vanderbilt | |
| Carolina Panthers | Aaron Hall | DT | Duke | |
| Carolina Panthers | Haynes King | QB | Georgia Tech | |
| Chicago Bears | Beau Gardner | LS | Georgia | |
| Chicago Bears | Mason Murphy | T | Auburn | |
| Chicago Bears | Skyler Thomas | S | Oregon State | |
| Denver Broncos | Brent Austin | CB | California | |
| Denver Broncos | Kolbe Katsis | WR | Northern Arizona | |
| Detroit Lions | Eric O'Neill | DE | Rutgers | |
| Green Bay Packers | J. Michael Sturdivant | WR | Florida | |
| Houston Texans | Sabastian Harsh | DE | NC State | |
| Houston Texans | Collin Wright | CB | Stanford | |
| Jacksonville Jaguars | Bryan Thomas Jr. | DE | South Carolina | |
| Kansas City Chiefs | Kahlil Benson | T | Indiana | |
| Kansas City Chiefs | Xavier Nwankpa | S | Iowa | |
| Los Angeles Chargers | Rodney Shelley | S | Georgia Tech | |
| Los Angeles Chargers | Jacob Spomer | C | Fresno State | |
| Los Angeles Rams | Wesley Bailey | LB | Louisville | |
| Los Angeles Rams | Dean Connors | RB | Houston | |
| Miami Dolphins | D. J. Herman | FB | San Diego State | |
| Minnesota Vikings | Jacob Thomas | S | James Madison | |
| Minnesota Vikings | Brett Thorson | P | Georgia | |
| New England Patriots | Tanner Arkin | TE | Illinois | |
| New England Patriots | Channing Canada | CB | TCU | |
| New Orleans Saints | CJ Donaldson | RB | Ohio State | |
| New York Giants | Ben Mann | LS | Boston College | |
| New York Giants | Dominic Zvada | K | Michigan | |
| New York Jets | Jaden Keller | LB | Virginia Tech | |
| New York Jets | Malik McClain | WR | Arizona State | |
| Philadelphia Eagles | Kapena Gushiken | S | Ole Miss | |
| Philadelphia Eagles | Rocco Underwood | LS | Florida | |
| Philadelphia Eagles | Dae'Quan Wright | TE | Ole Miss | |
| Pittsburgh Steelers | Kevin Jobity Jr. | DE | Syracuse | |
| San Francisco 49ers | Bryson Eason | DT | Tennessee | |
| San Francisco 49ers | James Thompson Jr. | DE | Illinois | |
| Tampa Bay Buccaneers | Jalon Daniels | QB | Kansas | |
| Tampa Bay Buccaneers | Ayden Garnes | CB | Arizona | |
| Washington Commanders | Drew Stevens | K | Iowa | |

== Trades involving draft picks ==
In the explanations below (PD) indicates trades completed prior to the start of the draft, while (D) denotes trades that take place during the 2026 draft.

== Resolution JC-2A picks ==
Resolution JC-2A, enacted by the NFL in November 2020, rewards teams for developing minority candidates for head coach and/or general manager positions. The resolution rewards teams whose minority candidates are hired away for one of those positions by awarding draft picks. These draft picks are at the end of the third round, after standard compensatory picks; if multiple teams qualify, they are awarded by draft order in the first round. These picks are in addition to, and have no impact on, the standard 32 compensatory picks. One pick was awarded pursuant to the resolution.

== Summary ==
=== Selections by NCAA conference ===
| Conference | Round 1 | Round 2 | Round 3 | Round 4 | Round 5 | Round 6 | Round 7 | Total |
NCAA Division I FBS football conferences
| American | 0 | 0 | 0 | 1 | 0 | 0 | 3 | 4 |
| ACC | 6 | 2 | 6 | 8 | 6 | 8 | 2 | 38 |
| Big 12 | 6 | 5 | 3 | 2 | 9 | 6 | 7 | 38 |
| Big Ten | 10 | 9 | 10 | 10 | 9 | 10 | 10 | 68 |
| CUSA | 0 | 0 | 0 | 0 | 0 | 0 | 1 | 1 |
| Ind. (FBS) | 2 | 0 | 2 | 1 | 1 | 1 | 0 | 7 |
| MAC | 0 | 1 | 0 | 0 | 0 | 0 | 3 | 4 |
| MW | 1 | 0 | 0 | 1 | 0 | 0 | 1 | 3 |
| Pac-12 | 0 | 0 | 0 | 0 | 0 | 0 | 0 | 0 |
| SEC | 7 | 15 | 14 | 15 | 13 | 10 | 13 | 87 |
| Sun Belt | 0 | 0 | 1 | 0 | 1 | 0 | 0 | 2 |
NCAA Division I FCS football conferences
| MVFC | 0 | 0 | 0 | 1 | 1 | 0 | 0 | 2 |
| SLC | 0 | 0 | 0 | 1 | 1 | 0 | 0 | 2 |
Non-college selections
| IPP | 0 | 0 | 0 | 0 | 0 | 0 | 1 | 1 |

=== Colleges with multiple draft selections ===
| Selections | Colleges |
|---|---|
| 11 | Ohio State |
| 10 | Alabama, Texas A&M |
| 9 | Clemson, Miami (FL), Texas Tech |
| 8 | Georgia, Indiana, Penn State |
| 7 | Florida, Iowa, LSU, Oklahoma, Oregon, Washington |
| 6 | Michigan, Missouri, Notre Dame, Texas |
| 5 | Auburn, Tennessee |
| 4 | Arizona, Arizona State, Arkansas, Boston College, Cincinnati, Kentucky |
| 3 | Duke, Illinois, South Carolina, TCU, USC, Utah |
| 2 | Baylor, BYU, Georgia Tech, Kansas, Kansas State, Michigan State, Mississippi State, Navy, NC State, North Dakota State, Northwestern, Ole Miss, Stanford, Toledo, Wake Forest |

=== Selections by position ===
| Position | Round 1 | Round 2 | Round 3 | Round 4 | Round 5 | Round 6 | Round 7 | Total |
|---|---|---|---|---|---|---|---|---|
| Wide receiver | 5 | 3 | 9 | 6 | 4 | 7 | 2 | 36 |
| Linebacker | 4 | 6 | 2 | 6 | 3 | 4 | 4 | 29 |
| Defensive tackle | 1 | 3 | 4 | 4 | 3 | 6 | 6 | 27 |
| Cornerback | 2 | 5 | 3 | 7 | 5 | 1 | 4 | 27 |
| Defensive end | 4 | 5 | 1 | 3 | 2 | 1 | 5 | 21 |
| Offensive tackle | 6 | 0 | 5 | 5 | 1 | 2 | 2 | 21 |
| Tight end | 1 | 4 | 4 | 1 | 6 | 1 | 4 | 21 |
| Safety | 2 | 3 | 3 | 1 | 6 | 0 | 4 | 19 |
| Guard | 3 | 1 | 1 | 3 | 3 | 5 | 2 | 18 |
| Running back | 2 | 0 | 1 | 2 | 3 | 2 | 3 | 13 |
| Center | 0 | 2 | 1 | 1 | 3 | 3 | 1 | 11 |
| Quarterback | 2 | 0 | 2 | 1 | 1 | 1 | 3 | 10 |
| Punter | 0 | 0 | 0 | 0 | 0 | 1 | 1 | 2 |
| Fullback | 0 | 0 | 0 | 0 | 1 | 0 | 0 | 1 |
| Kicker | 0 | 0 | 0 | 0 | 0 | 1 | 0 | 1 |
