= South Connellsville Borough Municipal Authority =

Agency overview
- Jurisdiction: South Connellsville Borough, Fayette County, Pennsylvania

The South Connellsville Borough Municipal Authority was created in the 1940s to oversee the construction of the Sewage Disposal Plant and the sewerage lines that fed into that plant along the Youghiogheny River in South Connellsville. The treatment plant was completed in 1951. In 1990, in accordance with the Department of Environmental Protection mandate, the disposal plant was razed, and a pump interconnecting station to the Connellsville Municipal Authority lines were made. Presently, the SCBMA oversees maintenance and tap-ins of existing locations within South Connellsville Borough.

== See also ==
- List of municipal authorities in Fayette County, Pennsylvania
