= List of Indiana Hoosiers in the NFL draft =

This is a list of Indiana Hoosiers football players in the NFL draft.

== Key ==
B	Back	K	Kicker	NT	Nose tackle
C	Center	LB	Linebacker	FB	Fullback
DB	Defensive back	P	Punter	HB	Halfback
DE	Defensive end	QB	Quarterback	WR	Wide receiver
DT	Defensive tackle	RB	Running back	G	Guard
E	End	T	Offensive tackle	TE	Tight end

== Selections ==
Year	Round	Pick	Overall	Player	Team	Position
1936	6	6	51	Ettore Antonini	Chicago Cardinals	E
1937	3	7	27	Vern Huffman	Detroit Lions	B
1937	6	10	60	Chris Del Sasso	Cleveland Rams	T
1938	1	1	1	Corbett Davis	Cleveland Rams	B
1938	2	4	14	Frank Filchock	Pittsburgh Steelers	B
1938	9	6	76	Jim Sirtosky	Detroit Lions	G
1938	11	5	95	Bob Kenderdine	Chicago Cardinals	E
1939	2	5	15	Bob Haak	Brooklyn Dodgers	T
1939	10	3	83	Frank Petrick	Cleveland Rams	E
1939	20	3	183	Paul Graham	Cleveland Rams	B
1941	6	9	49	Eddie Rucinski	Brooklyn Dodgers	E
1941	11	3	93	Emil Uremovich	Pittsburgh Steelers	T
1941	19	4	174	Harold Hursh	Cleveland Rams	B
1942	15	9	139	Jim Trimble	Green Bay Packers	T
1943	15	3	133	Earl Doloway	Chicago Cardinals	B
1944	1	6	6	Billy Hillenbrand	New York Giants	B
1944	4	1	28	Jack Tavener	Chicago Cardinals	C
1944	10	1	88	Lou Saban	Chicago Cardinals	B
1944	24	3	244	Chuck Jacoby	Detroit Lions	B
1944	28	2	287	Bob Zimny	Brooklyn Dodgers	T
1944	31	1	319	Russ Deal	Green Bay Packers	G
1945	5	9	41	Pete Pihos	Philadelphia Eagles	WR
1945	12	2	111	Bob Cowan	Chicago Cardinals	B
1945	16	1	154	John Cannady	Chicago Cardinals	B
1946	22	6	206	Howie Brown	Green Bay Packers	G
1946	26	8	248	Ben Raimondi	Philadelphia Eagles	B
1947	3	9	22	John Cannady	New York Giants	C
1947	6	6	41	Ben Raimondi	Chicago Cardinals	B
1947	11	9	94	Robert Hoernschemeyer	New York Giants	B
1947	17	5	150	Bob Ravensberg	Chicago Cardinals	E
1947	18	5	160	Jim Goodman	Green Bay Packers	T
1947	19	8	173	Jimmy Dewar	Los Angeles Rams	B
1948	10	7	82	Dick Deranek	Pittsburgh Steelers	B
1948	14	3	118	Chick Jagade	Washington Redskins	B
1948	29	8	273	Rex Grossman	Philadelphia Eagles	B
1949	4	9	40	John Goldsberry	Chicago Cardinals	T
1949	13	8	129	George Taliaferro	Chicago Bears	B
1949	16	4	155	Jerry Morrical	New York Giants	T
1949	25	7	248	Nick Sebek	Washington Redskins	B
1950	21	5	266	Casimir Witucki	Washington Redskins	G
1952	8	2	87	Mel Becket	Green Bay Packers	C
1952	15	2	171	John Davis	Chicago Cardinals	B
1952	19	8	225	Sam Talarico	Cleveland Browns	T
1952	23	11	276	Bobby Robertson	Cleveland Browns	B
1952	25	2	291	Cliff Anderson	Chicago Cardinals	E
1953	2	12	25	Gene Gedman	Detroit Lions	B
1953	20	1	230	Pete Russo	Baltimore Colts	T
1954	7	7	80	Harry Jagielski	Washington Redskins	T
1955	25	4	293	Nate Borden	Green Bay Packers	E
1956	5	7	56	Bob Skoronski	Green Bay Packers	T
1957	5	4	53	Milt Campbell	Cleveland Browns	B
1957	6	2	63	Joe Amstutz	Cleveland Browns	C
1957	14	9	166	Bob Fee	Chicago Cardinals	B
1957	15	8	177	Brad Bomba	Washington Redskins	E
1957	21	5	246	Gene Cichowski	Pittsburgh Steelers	QB
1958	13	6	151	Jim Yore	San Francisco 49ers	B
1958	22	2	255	Tony Aloisio	Chicago Cardinals	E
1958	24	12	289	Dave Whitsell	Detroit Lions	B
1959	2	7	19	Mike Rabold	Detroit Lions	T
1959	24	9	285	Thomas J. Campbell	Los Angeles Rams	B
1959	27	2	314	Bob Corrigan	Chicago Cardinals	G
1959	27	9	321	John Aveni	Chicago Bears	E
1960	11	3	123	Ted Aucreman	Detroit Lions	E
1960	13	2	146	Vic Jones	St. Louis Cardinals	B
1961	5	10	66	Earl Faison	Detroit Lions	E
1961	9	11	123	Moses Gray	New York Giants	T
1961	16	5	215	Wilbert Scott	Pittsburgh Steelers	B
1961	18	2	240	Randy Williams	Dallas Cowboys	B
1961	18	13	251	Ed Morris	Cleveland Browns	T
1963	6	10	80	John Johnson	Chicago Bears	T
1963	14	4	186	Nate Ramsey	Philadelphia Eagles	B
1963	18	11	249	Jeff Slabaugh	Chicago Bears	E
1963	19	4	256	Mike Wasdovich	Philadelphia Eagles	G
1964	1	8	8	Marv Woodson	Baltimore Colts	DB
1965	1	11	11	Tom Nowatzke	Detroit Lions	RB
1965	8	7	105	Don Croftcheck	Washington Redskins	G
1966	1	4	4	Randy Beisler	Philadelphia Eagles	DE
1966	3	7	39	Bill Malinchak	Detroit Lions	WR
1966	12	1	171	Ken Hollister	Atlanta Falcons	T
1966	20	9	299	Tom Gallagher	St. Louis Cardinals	DE
1967	5	7	114	Bob Van Pelt	Philadelphia Eagles	C
1968	1	27	27	Doug Crusan	Miami Dolphins	T
1968	9	23	242	Terry Cole	Baltimore Colts	RB
1968	16	27	435	Brown Marks	Cincinnati Bengals	LB
1969	4	8	86	Jim Sniadecki	San Francisco 49ers	LB
1969	9	19	227	Cal Snowden	St. Louis Cardinals	DE
1969	16	1	391	Robert Kirk	Buffalo Bills	G
1970	2	22	48	John Isenbarger	San Francisco 49ers	RB
1970	6	17	147	Jade Butcher	Atlanta Falcons	WR
1970	17	24	440	Eric Stolberg	Oakland Raiders	WR
1971	5	26	130	John Andrews	Baltimore Colts	TE
1971	10	24	258	Chris Morris	Minnesota Vikings	G
1972	14	3	341	Steve Porter	Cincinnati Bengals	WR
1973	5	8	112	Mike Fulk	San Francisco 49ers	LB
1973	6	24	154	Glen Skolnik	Pittsburgh Steelers	WR
1973	8	2	184	Dan Lintner	Philadelphia Eagles	DB
1973	9	14	222	Roberet Spicer	New York Jets	LB
1973	15	16	380	Ted McNulty	Cincinnati Bengals	QB
1974	1	6	6	Carl Barzilauskas	New York Jets	DT
1974	13	20	332	Stu O'Dell	Washington Redskins	LB
1975	6	22	152	Larry Jameson	St. Louis Cardinals	DT
1976	6	25	181	Greg McGuire	Dallas Cowboys	T
1976	8	12	221	John Jordan	New York Giants	DT
1976	11	7	298	Donald Thomas	New England Patriots	LB
1976	12	21	340	Frank Stavroff	Baltimore Colts	K
1976	14	18	393	Quinn Buckner	Washington Redskins	DB
1976	15	4	407	Jack Hoffman	San Diego Chargers	DT
1976	15	16	419	Trent Smock	Detroit Lions	WR
1977	9	8	231	Dave Knowles	New Orleans Saints	T
1978	10	23	273	Charles Peal	Los Angeles Rams	T
1979	2	17	45	Joe Norman	Seattle Seahawks	LB
1980	3	6	62	Mike Friede	Detroit Lions	WR
1981	10	12	260	Tim Clifford	Chicago Bears	QB
1981	11	11	287	Lonnie Johnson	Chicago Bears	RB
1981	12	25	329	Nate Lundy	Dallas Cowboys	WR
1983	6	28	168	Babe Laufenberg	Washington Redskins	QB
1983	10	20	271	Jimmy Thomas	Green Bay Packers	DB
1984	10	17	269	Mark Smiythe	St. Louis Cardinals	DT
1984u	1	23	23	Duane Gunn	Pittsburgh Steelers	WR
1985	1	9	9	Kevin Allen	Philadelphia Eagles	T
1985	10	27	279	Mike Pendleton	Miami Dolphins	DB
1986	12	11	316	Steve Bradley	Cincinnati Bengals	QB
1986	12	20	325	Bobby Howard	Philadelphia Eagles	RB
1987	3	20	76	Leonard Bell	Cincinnati Bengals	DB
1988	1	10	10	Eric Moore	New York Giants	T
1988	3	22	77	Van Waiters	Cleveland Browns	LB
1988	7	14	179	Ernie Jones	Phoenix Cardinals	WR
1988	10	10	259	Eric Hickerson	New York Giants	DB
1989	8	8	203	Pete Stoyanovich	Miami Dolphins	K
1989	9	12	235	Gary Gooden	Los Angeles Raiders	DB
1990	2	6	31	Anthony Thompson	Phoenix Cardinals	RB
1990	5	5	114	Ian Beckles	Tampa Bay Buccaneers	G
1991	2	1	28	Mike Dumas	Houston Oilers	DB
1991	6	7	146	Nolan Harrison	Los Angeles Raiders	DT
1991	12	6	312	Ernie Thompson	Los Angeles Rams	RB
1992	1	21	21	Vaughn Dunbar	New Orleans Saints	RB
1992	4	3	87	Shawn Harper	Los Angeles Rams	T
1993	3	28	84	Mike Middleton	Dallas Cowboys	DB
1993	8	26	222	Trent Green	San Diego Chargers	QB
1994	1	24	24	Thomas Lewis	New York Giants	WR
1995	2	21	53	Andrew Greene	Miami Dolphins	G
1995	5	27	161	Lance Brown	Pittsburgh Steelers	DB
1996	7	40	249	Eric Smedley	Buffalo Bills	DB
1997	2	2	32	Nathan Davis	Atlanta Falcons	DT
1997	6	4	167	Steve Lee	Baltimore Ravens	RB
1998	7	9	198	Victor Allotey	Buffalo Bills	G
1998	7	18	207	Chris Liwienski	Detroit Lions	G
2002	2	30	62	Antwaan Randle El	Pittsburgh Steelers	WR
2003	7	18	232	Gibran Hamdan	Washington Redskins	QB
2005	3	4	68	Courtney Roby	Tennessee Titans	WR
2006	4	15	112	Isaac Sowells	Cleveland Browns	G
2006	4	16	113	Victor Adeyanju	St. Louis Rams	DE
2008	2	9	40	Tracy Porter	New Orleans Saints	DB
2008	2	10	41	James Hardy	Buffalo Bills	WR
2010	2	1	33	Rodger Saffold	St. Louis Rams	T
2010	7	25	232	Jammie Kirlew	Denver Broncos	DE
2010	7	39	246	Ray Fisher	Indianapolis Colts	DB
2011	4	20	117	James Brewer	New York Giants	T
2011	4	26	123	Tandon Doss	Baltimore Ravens	WR
2014	2	24	56	Cody Latimer	Denver Broncos	WR
2014	7	2	217	Ted Bolser	Washington Redskins	TE
2015	3	9	73	Tevin Coleman	Atlanta Falcons	RB
2016	2	17	48	Jason Spriggs	Green Bay Packers	T
2016	5	11	150	Jordan Howard	Chicago Bears	RB
2016	6	12	187	Nate Sudfeld	Washington Redskins	QB
2017	3	7	71	Dan Feeney	Los Angeles Chargers	G
2018	4	1	101	Ian Thomas	Carolina Panthers	TE
2018	6	19	193	Chris Covington	Dallas Cowboys	LB
2019	4	29	131	Wes Martin	Washington Redskins	G
2020	6	30	209	Simon Stepaniak	Green Bay Packers	G
2021	5	20	164	Jamar Johnson	Denver Broncos	DB
2022	5	3	146	Micah McFadden	New York Giants	LB
2025	4	11	113	CJ West	San Francisco 49ers	DT
2025	7	11	227	Kurtis Rourke	San Francisco 49ers	QB
2026	1	1	1	Fernando Mendoza	Las Vegas Raiders	QB
2026	1	30	30	Omar Cooper Jr.	New York Jets	WR
2026	2	18	50	D'Angelo Ponds	New York Jets	DB
2026	3	26	90	Kaelon Black	San Francisco 49ers	RB
2026	4	15	115	Elijah Sarratt	Baltimore Ravens	WR
2026	5	29	169	Riley Nowakowski	Pittsburgh Steelers	TE
2026	6	13	194	Pat Coogan	Tennessee Titans	C
2026	7	27	243	Aiden Fisher	Houston Texans	LB

== Notable undrafted players ==
Note: No drafts held before 1920

Year	Player	Position	Debut Team	Notes
1960	Charley Leo	G	Boston Patriots	—
1960	Charlie Scales	RB	Pittsburgh Steelers	—
1965	Rich Badar	QB	Washington Redskins	—
1965	Rudy Kuechenberg	LB	Dallas Cowboys	—
1967	Frank Stavroff	QB	Denver Broncos	—
1970	Ken Johnson	DE	Dallas Cowboys	—
1973	Chris Gartner	K	Dallas Cowboys	—
1982	Craig Walls	LB	Pittsburgh Steelers	—
1987	Nate Borders	DB	Cincinnati Bengals	—
1987	Stacey Dawsey	WR	New Orleans Saints	—
1987	Alex Green	DB	Dallas Cowboys	—
1987	Mike McCurry	G	Minnesota Vikings	—
1988	Dan Stryzinski	P	Indianapolis Colts	—
1989	Tim Jorden	TE	Phoenix Cardinals	—
1994	Hurvin McCormack	DT	Dallas Cowboys	—
1994	Lamar Mills	DE	Washington Redskins	—
1994	Damon Watts	DB	Indianapolis Colts	—
1994	Bernard Whittington	DT	Indianapolis Colts	—
1995	Troy Drake	T	Philadelphia Eagles	—
1995	Trevor Wilmot	LB	Indianapolis Colts	—
1998	Joey Eloms	DB	Seattle Seahawks	—
1998	Kywin Supernaw	DB	Detroit Lions	—
2000	Adewale Ogunleye	DE	Miami Dolphins	—
2002	Marcus Floyd	CB	New York Jets	—
2002	Kemp Rasmussen	DE	Carolina Panthers	—
2002	Justin Smith	LB	Tampa Bay Buccaneers	—
2002	Levron Williams	RB	San Diego Chargers	—
2003	Enoch DeMar	G	Cleveland Browns	—
2003	Kris Dielman	G	San Diego Chargers	—
2005	Aaron Halterman	TE	Houston Texans	—
2005	Herana-Daze Jones	S	Cincinnati Bengals	—
2009	Marcus Thigpen	RB	Philadelphia Eagles	—
2012	Andrew McDonald	T	Miami Dolphins	—
2015	Shane Wynn	WR	Atlanta Falcons	—
2016	Darius Latham	DT	Oakland Raiders	—
2017	Marcus Oliver	LB	Philadelphia Eagles	—
2017	Devine Redding	RB	Kansas City Chiefs	—
2018	Simmie Cobbs	WR	Washington Redskins	—
2018	Robert McCray	LB	Kansas City Chiefs	—
2018	Tegray Scales	LB	Los Angeles Rams	—
2019	Brandon Knight	T	Dallas Cowboys	—
2020	Nick Westbrook-Ikhine	WR	Tennessee Titans	—
2021	Harry Crider	G	Philadelphia Eagles	—
2021	Whop Philyor	WR	Minnesota Vikings	—
2022	Ryder Anderson	DT	New York Giants	—
2022	Ty Fryfogle	WR	Dallas Cowboys	—
2022	Peyton Hendershot	TE	Dallas Cowboys	—
2022	Caleb Jones	T	Green Bay Packers	—
2022	Raheem Layne	S	Los Angeles Chargers	—
2022	Marcelino McCrary-Ball	LB	San Francisco 49ers	—
2023	Luke Haggard	T	Tampa Bay Buccaneers	—
2023	Cam Jones	LB	Kansas City Chiefs	—
2023	Tiawan Mullen	CB	Los Angeles Chargers	—
2023	Jaylin Williams	DB	Minnesota Vikings	—
2024	Aaron Casey	LB	Cincinnati Bengals	—
2025	James Carpenter	DT	Jacksonville Jaguars	—
2025	Zach Horton	TE	Detroit Lions	—
2025	Myles Price	WR	Minnesota Vikings	—
2025	Jailin Walker	LB	Las Vegas Raiders	—
2025	Trey Wedig	T	Los Angeles Rams	—
2025	Ke'Shawn Williams	WR	Pittsburgh Steelers	—
2026	Kahlil Benson	OL	Kansas City Chiefs	—
2026	Devan Boykin	DB	Pittsburgh Steelers	—
2026	Jonathan Brady	WR/PR	Las Vegas Raiders	—
2026	Roman Hemby	RB	Las Vegas Raiders	—
2026	Mikail Kamara	DE	San Francisco 49ers	—
2026	Mark Langston	LS	Buffalo Bills	—
2026	Louis Moore	S	Miami Dolphins	—
2026	E.J. Williams Jr.	WR	Las Vegas Raiders	—

== Notes ==
Duane Gunn was drafted in the 1984 Supplemental Draft.
