= Connellsville Area School District =

School district in Pennsylvania

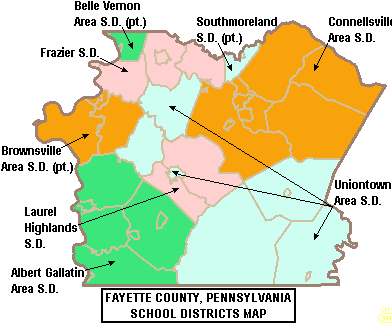

Address
- 732 Rock Ridge Road Connellsville, Fayette County, Pennsylvania, 15425; United States

District information
- Type: Public

Other information
- Website: www.casdfalcons.org

The Connellsville Area School District is a large rural, public school district which covers the City of Connellsville, the Boroughs of Dawson, Dunbar, Seven Springs, South Connellsville and Vanderbilt and Bullskin Township, Connellsville Township, Dunbar Township, Saltlick Township, Springfield Township and Stewart Township in Fayette County, Pennsylvania. The district encompasses approximately 216 square miles (560 km^{2}). According to 2000 federal census data, Connellsville Area School District serves a resident population of 38,303. By 2010, the district's population declined to 34,453 people. The educational attainment levels for the Connellsville Area School District population (25 years old and over) were 85.2% high school graduates and 11.6% college graduates. The district is one of the 500 public school districts of Pennsylvania. Connellsville Area School District was established in 1966. It is considered a Second Class public school district due to its resident population exceeding 30,000, but being less than two hundred fifty thousand (250,000) people.

According to the Pennsylvania Budget and Policy Center, 55.7% of the district's pupils lived at 185% or below the Federal Poverty Level as shown by their eligibility for the federal free or reduced price school meal programs in 2012. In 2013, the Pennsylvania Department of Education, reported that 43 students in the Connellsville Area School District were homeless.

In 2009, the district residents' per capita income was $15,194 a year, while the median family income was $35,638. In Fayette County, the median household income was $39,115. In the Commonwealth, the median family income was $49,501 and the United States median family income was $49,445, in 2010. By 2013, the median household income in the United States rose to $52,100. In 2014, the median household income in the USA was $53,700.

The Intermediate Unit IU1 provides the district with a wide variety of services like specialized education for disabled students and hearing, background checks for employees, state mandated recognizing and reporting child abuse training, speech and visual disability services and criminal background check processing for prospective employees and professional development for staff and faculty.

== Schools ==
Connellsville Area School District operates eleven schools including a career-technical school and a cyber academy is available to students in grades 7th through 12Th..

- Connellsville Area Senior High School
- Connellsville Area Career & Technology Center is located above the high school, and was built in 1972. The center serves about 500 students in grades 10–12. CACTC was renovated during the 2008-09 school term.
- Connellsville Area Middle School serves all district students from grades six to eighth. Originally constructed in 1956 as the Connellsville Joint High School, then the high school upon consolidation in 1966 and lastly in 1970 served until 2012 as one of two Junior High Schools in the district before the other Junior High School was closed in 2012, becoming the sole Junior High before transitioning to a Middle School in 2017.

Elementary Schools

There are four elementary schools in the district, all facilitate classes for grades K-5.

- Bullskin Township Elementary School is located on Pleasant Valley Road (State Route 982) in Connellsville, PA, and was built in 1956. The last renovation was in 1998, when a 4,000 sq ft (370 m^{2}). addition was added to the structure. About 450 students attend school here.
- Dunbar Township Elementary School is located on Ridge Boulevard near Connellsville, PA. The school holds a census of about 600 and was built in 1966.
- Springfield-Clifford N. Pritts Elementary School was built in 2004 and is located on School House Lane in Normalville, PA. Upon the closure of the Clifford N. Pritts School in 2017, due to a prior naming stipulation with that school, the name Clifford N. Pritts was combined with the Springfield Name, as the students from that former school merged with Springfield.
- West Crawford Elementary School was constructed in 1918 as the Dunbar Township High School. As part of the 1966 district merger, the school became a Junior High School and remained unchanged until 1999, at which time the 1912, 1918, and 1942 sections were razed and an addition to the existing 1960 wing was made. The school was converted to an elementary school during the 2012-13 school term and cost $1.2 million in renovations for its new use.

== Closed schools ==
- Zachariah Connell Elementary School was located on Park Street in Connellsville, PA and was opened in 1967. The school building closed in 2013 and students now attend school in the former Junior High West building, which resulted in a $1.2 million renovation and the creation of West Crawford Elementary School. In October 2015 the board voted to sell the building and associated lot to Highlands Hospital for $207,000. Connellsville Area School Board voted unanimously to use the proceeds from the sale of the building toward technology and software upgrades in the district.
- Connellsville Junior High School West closed in 2012; students shifted to the combined Connellsville Area Junior High School in the Connellsville Junior High School East building. It was for a short time Connellsville Area Junior High before becoming West Crawford Elementary School in 2014
- South Side Elementary School was located on Race Street in Connellsville, PA and was built in 1965, and demolished in 2018. There were about 325 pupils on the SSE Campus. South Side Elementary school was demolished in October 2018. A time capsule located in the cornerstone by Ritenour Demolition was donated to the Connellsville History Museum at the Carnegie Free Library and was opened in a ceremony celebrating the grand reopening of the museum. There was talk by the mayor of re-opening the basketball court/ice skating surface for community recreation purposes.
- Connellsville Township Elementary School is located on Rock Ridge Road in Connellsville, PA. The school was built in 1963. No longer utilized as an elementary school, it houses the district's administrative office and a few leased classrooms to the county head start program.
- Dunbar Borough Elementary School was built in 1974 and closed as part of district reorganization in 2017. It has since become home to a food production and vending business.
- Originally known as Saltlick Township Elementary School, Clifford N. Pritts Elementary School opened in 1968 along Indian Creek Valley Road in Saltlick Township. It was renamed in memory of the districts' first superintendent of schools in 1992. As a stipulation when it was named, upon its 2017 closure due to district-wide reorganization, its name was added to the Springfield Elementary School. The property is presently under potential development.
