= Connellsville Area Career and Technology Center =

Coordinates: 40.02135°N 79.57350°W

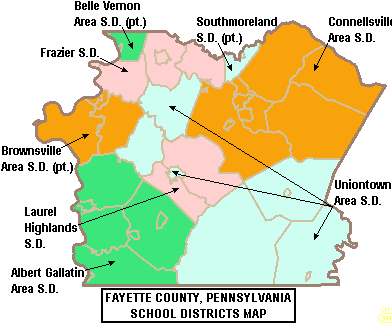

Location
- 720 Locust Street Extension; Connellsville, Fayette County, Pennsylvania 15425; United States

Information
- Type: Public
- Established: 1972
- School district: Connellsville Area School District
- Principal: Bruce I. Jaynes
- Staff: 5
- Faculty: 25 (2016)
- Grades: 9–12
- Enrollment: 279 pupils (2015)
- Language: English
- Campus type: Vocational-Technical School
- Colors: Royal Blue and White
- Team name: Falcons
- Newspaper: Falconeer
- Yearbook: Aerie
- Feeder schools: Connellsville Area Junior High School, Connellsville Area Senior High School
- Website: https://cactc.casdfalcons.org/

Connellsville Area Career and Technical Center is a comprehensive Vocational-Technical School, in the Connellsville Area School District. The school is located above the Connellsville Area Senior High School. CACTC serves grades 11-12 Full-Time with core curriculum classes held at the school. Sophomore students attend part-time, while attending the Connellsville Area Senior High School for the core curriculum. The school is run by the Connellsville Area School District. In 2015, enrollment was reported as 279 pupils in 9th through 12th grades. The school employed 25 teachers.

== Campus history ==
The school opened in 1972 as North Fayette Area Vocational-Technical School, Connellsville along with Frazier School District, managed the school as students from both schools attended either morning or afternoon sessions until 2001, when Frazier severed ties from the school, citing a lengthy distance between NFAVTS and their school campus, however, the students were able to complete their studies at North Fayette until they graduated. Students still attended half day sessions until 2007, when it was created into a single secondary school of the Connellsville Area School District and named its current name. In 2008, a $15 Million Renovation and Addition of the structure took place, adding a Gymnasium, Cafeteria, and a few more program areas.

== Programs ==
CACTC offers programs to choose from including:

- Automotive Collision Technology Repair
- Automotive Mechanics Technology
- Carpentry
- Computer Networking
- Cosmetology
- Culinary Arts/Bakery
- Electrical Occupations
- Electronic Technology
- Health Occupations
- HVAC
- Marketing/Management
- Masonry
- Protective Services
- Welding/Metal Fabrication

== Adult Education ==
The CACTC offers daytime education to adults and evening programs. The school also offers free GED assistance.

== Extracurricular activities ==
CACTC has many clubs pertaining to the curriculum; students, however, have the opportunity to participate in athletics at Connellsville Area Senior High School.
