= Vanderbilt, Pennsylvania =

Borough in Pennsylvania, US

- Borough
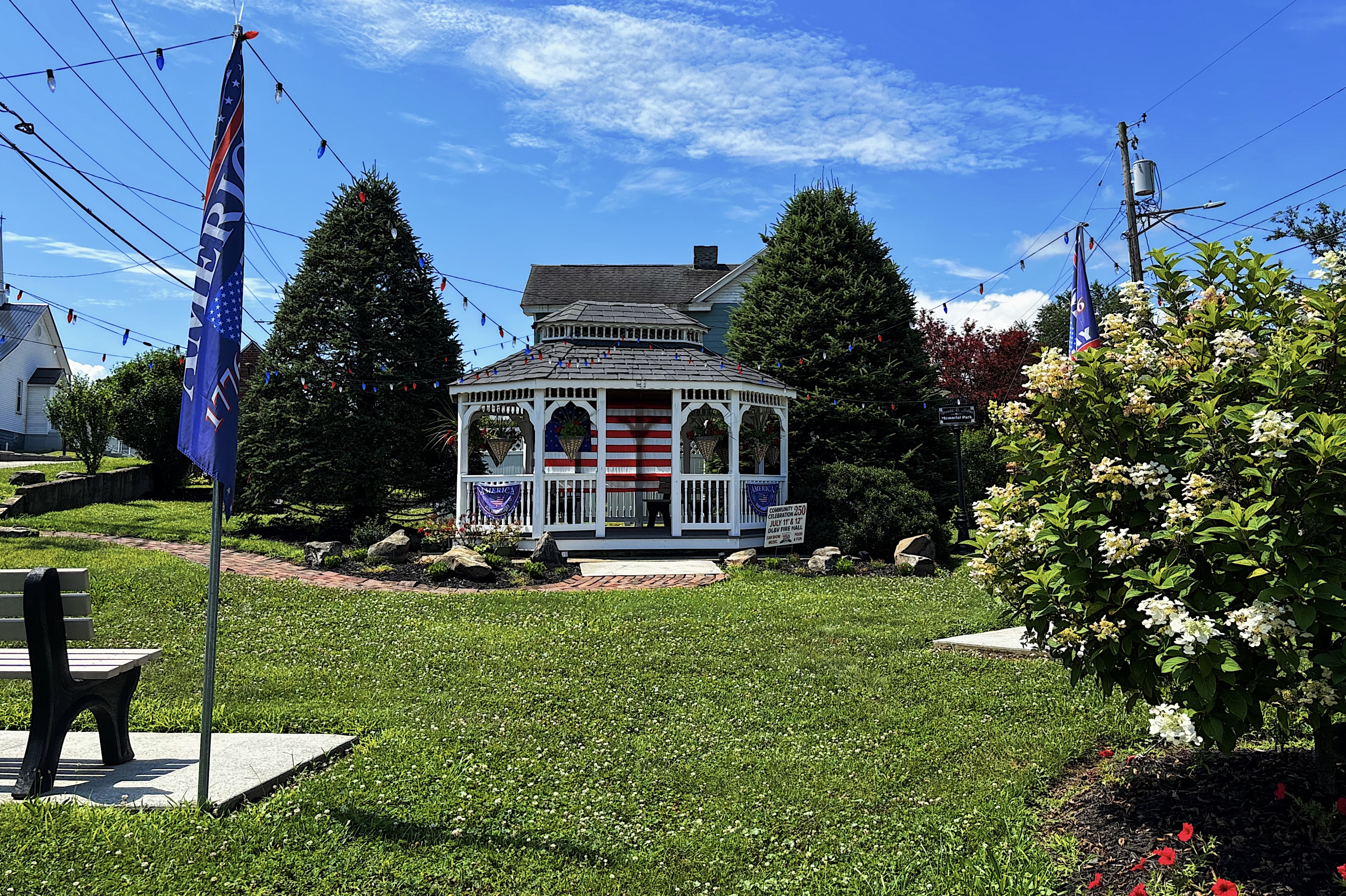
- Harold D. Miller Memorial Park on Main Street (c. 2005)
- Etymology: Cornelius Vanderbilt
- Location of Vanderbilt in Fayette County, Pennsylvania.

- Location in Pennsylvania Vanderbilt (the United States)
- Coordinates: 40°2′3″N 79°39′50″W
- Country: United States
- State: Pennsylvania
- County: Fayette
- Established: 1903

Government
  - Mayor: Cindy Morris

Area
  - Total: 0.18 sq mi (0.47 km^{2})
  - Land: 0.18 sq mi (0.47 km^{2})
  - Water: 0 sq mi (0.00 km^{2})
- Elevation: 960 ft (290 m)

Population (2020)
  - Total: 414 ▼
  - Estimate (2021): 408
  - Density: 2,464.0/sq mi (951.35/km^{2})
- Time zone: UTC-4 (EST)
  - Summer (DST): UTC-5 (EDT)
- ZIP code: 15486
- Area code: 724
- FIPS code: 42-79768

Vanderbilt is a borough in Fayette County, Pennsylvania, United States. The population was 414 at the 2020 census, a decline from the figure of 476 tabulated in 2010. The town is named for the railroad tycoon Cornelius Vanderbilt and is served by the Connellsville Area School District.

== Geography ==
Vanderbilt is located in northern Fayette County at 40°2′3″N 79°39′50″W (40.034078, −79.663825).

According to the United States Census Bureau, the borough has a total area of 0.18 square miles (0.454 km^{2}), all land.

== Demographics ==
Historical population
Census	Pop.	Note	%±
1910	1,198		—
1920	1,183		−1.3%
1930	994		−16.0%
1940	1,063		6.9%
1950	937		−11.9%
1960	826		−11.8%
1970	755		−8.6%
1980	689		−8.7%
1990	545		−20.9%
2000	553		1.5%
2010	476		−13.9%
2020	419		−12.0%
2021 (est.)	408	▼	−2.6%

As of the 2000 census, there were 553 people, 222 households, and 150 families residing in the borough. The population density was 2,995.9 inhabitants per square mile (1,156.7/km^{2}). There were 234 housing units at an average density of 1,267.7 per square mile (489.5/km^{2}). The racial makeup of the borough was 96.56% White and 3.44% African American.

There were 222 households, out of which 29.3% had children under the age of 18 living with them, 52.3% were married couples living together, 13.1% had a female householder with no husband present, and 32.4% were non-families. 27.5% of all households were made up of individuals, and 12.6% had someone living alone who was 65 years of age or older. The average household size was 2.49 and the average family size was 3.07.

In the borough the population was spread out, with 23.5% under the age of 18, 9.4% from 18 to 24, 26.8% from 25 to 44, 26.0% from 45 to 64, and 14.3% who were 65 years of age or older. The median age was 38 years. For every 100 females there were 90.7 males. For every 100 females age 18 and over, there were 88.0 males.

The median income for a household in the borough was $28,125, and the median income for a family was $39,306. Males had a median income of $32,083 versus $17,500 for females. The per capita income for the borough was $14,045. About 9.4% of families and 18.7% of the population were below the poverty line, including 19.8% of those under age 18 and 8.9% of those age 65 or over.

== Mine fire ==
Vanderbilt is the site of a mine fire, which, unlike the one in Centralia, Pennsylvania, has had comparably little impact on the borough.
