= South Connellsville, Pennsylvania =

Borough in Pennsylvania, US

- Borough
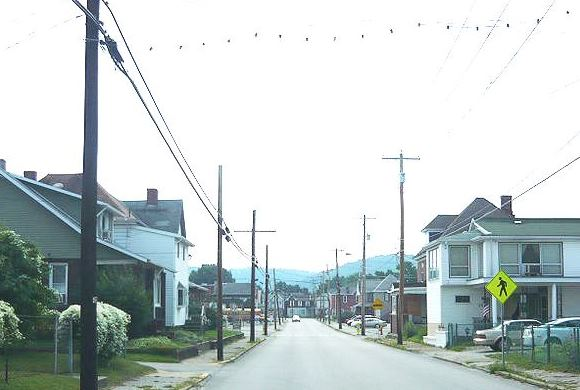
- Pittsburgh Street

- Location of South Connellsville in Fayette County, Pennsylvania.

- Location in Pennsylvania South Connellsville (the United States)
- Coordinates: 39°59′53″N 79°35′10″W
- Country: United States
- State: Pennsylvania
- County: Fayette
- Established: 1910

Government
  - Mayor: Chris Wiltrout

Area
  - Total: 1.71 sq mi (4.43 km^{2})
  - Land: 1.68 sq mi (4.35 km^{2})
  - Water: 0.027 sq mi (0.07 km^{2})
- Elevation: 1,034 ft (315 m)

Population (2020)
  - Total: 1,917
  - Density: 1,140.2/sq mi (440.25/km^{2})
- Time zone: UTC-4 (EST)
  - Summer (DST): UTC-5 (EDT)
- ZIP code: 15425
- Area code: 724
- FIPS code: 42-72080
- Website: www.southconnellsvilleboroughpa.com

South Connellsville is a borough in Fayette County, Pennsylvania, United States. The population was 1,919 at the 2020 census, a decline from the figure of 1,970 tabulated in 2010.

== Geography ==
South Connellsville is located in northeastern Fayette County at 39°59′53″N 79°35′10″W (39.998007, −79.586127). It is bordered to the north by the city of Connellsville and to the west by the Youghiogheny River.

According to the United States Census Bureau, the borough has a total area of 1.73 square miles (4.48 km^{2}), of which 1.66 square miles (4.30 km^{2}) is land and 0.07 square miles (0.17 km^{2}), or 3.87%, is water.

== Demographics ==
Historical population
Census	Pop.	Note	%±
1920	2,196		—
1930	2,516		14.6%
1940	2,628		4.5%
1950	2,610		−0.7%
1960	2,434		−6.7%
1970	2,385		−2.0%
1980	2,296		−3.7%
1990	2,204		−4.0%
2000	2,281		3.5%
2010	1,970		−13.6%
2020	1,917		−2.7%
2021 (est.)	1,891	▼	−1.4%
U.S. Decennial Census

As of the 2000 census, there were 2,281 people, 890 households, and 637 families residing in the borough. The population density was 1,355.1 inhabitants per square mile (523.2/km^{2}). There were 948 housing units at an average density of 563.2 per square mile (217.5/km^{2}). The racial makeup of the borough was 97.94% White, 1.36% African American, 0.04% Native American, 0.09% from other races, and 0.57% from two or more races. Hispanic or Latino of any race were 0.31% of the population.

There were 890 households, out of which 30.9% had children under the age of 18 living with them, 56.7% were married couples living together, 10.3% had a female householder with no husband present, and 28.4% were non-families. 24.7% of all households were made up of individuals, and 10.9% had someone living alone who was 65 years of age or older. The average household size was 2.53 and the average family size was 3.01.

In the borough the population was spread out, with 23.7% under the age of 18, 7.1% from 18 to 24, 28.2% from 25 to 44, 24.2% from 45 to 64, and 16.7% who were 65 years of age or older. The median age was 40 years. For every 100 females, there were 93.5 males. For every 100 females age 18 and over, there were 92.7 males.

The median income for a household in the borough was $33,750, and the median income for a family was $36,113. Males had a median income of $31,636 versus $17,415 for females. The per capita income for the borough was $15,261. About 8.9% of families and 12.2% of the population were below the poverty line, including 18.3% of those under age 18 and 8.1% of those age 65 or over.

== Education ==
South Connellsville is served by the Connellsville Area School District. Children in grades K–5 attend West Crawford Elementary, students in grades 6–8 attend Connellsville Middle School, and students in grades 9–12 attend Connellsville Area Senior High School.

== Public services ==
South Connellsville Volunteer Fire Company offers fire protection to the borough. The borough, through a signed contract, is policed by the Connellsville PD. EMS services are provided by Fayette EMS in nearby Connellsville.

== Municipal Authority ==
The South Connellsville Municipal Authority has overseen sewerage enforcement services, having operated the public sewer system since 1951. In the 1980s an inter-municipal pipeline was placed, which sends all wastewater to the Connellsville Municipal Authority in Connellsville.

== Notable people ==
- Tamora Pierce, fantasy fiction author
- John Woodruff, athlete
