= Connellsville Area Senior High School =

Public school in Pennsylvania, United States

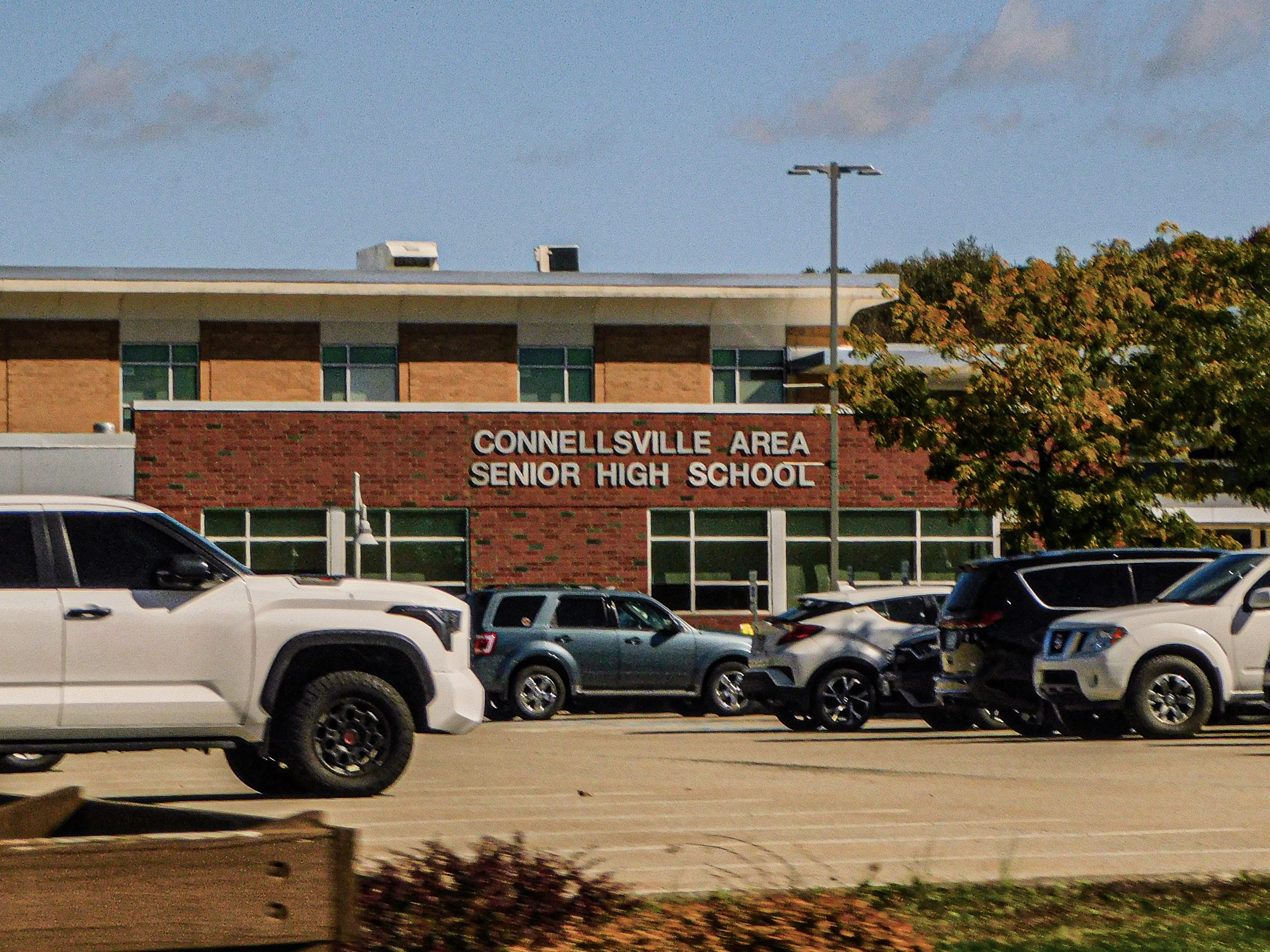
- Connellsville High School in 2025

Location
- 201 Falcon Drive; Connellsville, Fayette County, Pennsylvania 15425; United States; 40.02506°N 79.57376°W

Information
- Type: Public
- Established: 1966
- School district: Connellsville Area School District
- Principal: Nicholas Bosnic
- Teaching staff: 66.31
- Grades: 9th-12th
- Enrollment: 667 (2024–2025)
- Student to teacher ratio: 10.06
- Language: English
- Campus size: 222,000 Square Feet
- Colors: Royal Blue and White
- Athletics conference: PIAA District 7 (WPIAL)
- Team name: Falcons
- Newspaper: Falconeer
- Yearbook: Aerie
- Feeder schools: Connellsville Area Junior High School
- Website: CAHS Website

Connellsville Area High School is a rural, public high school, located in Connellsville, Pennsylvania, United States of America. It is operated by the Connellsville Area School District. In the 2016–2017 school year, enrollment was reported as 1,138 pupils in 9th through 12th grades. Connellsville Area Senior High School students may choose to attend Connellsville Area Career and Technology Center (also run by the Connellsville Area School District) for training in the construction and mechanical trades. The Intermediate Unit IU1 provides the school with a wide variety of services like: specialized education for disabled students and hearing, background checks for employees, state mandated recognizing and reporting child abuse training, speech and visual disability services and criminal background check processing for prospective employees and professional development for staff and faculty.

== History ==
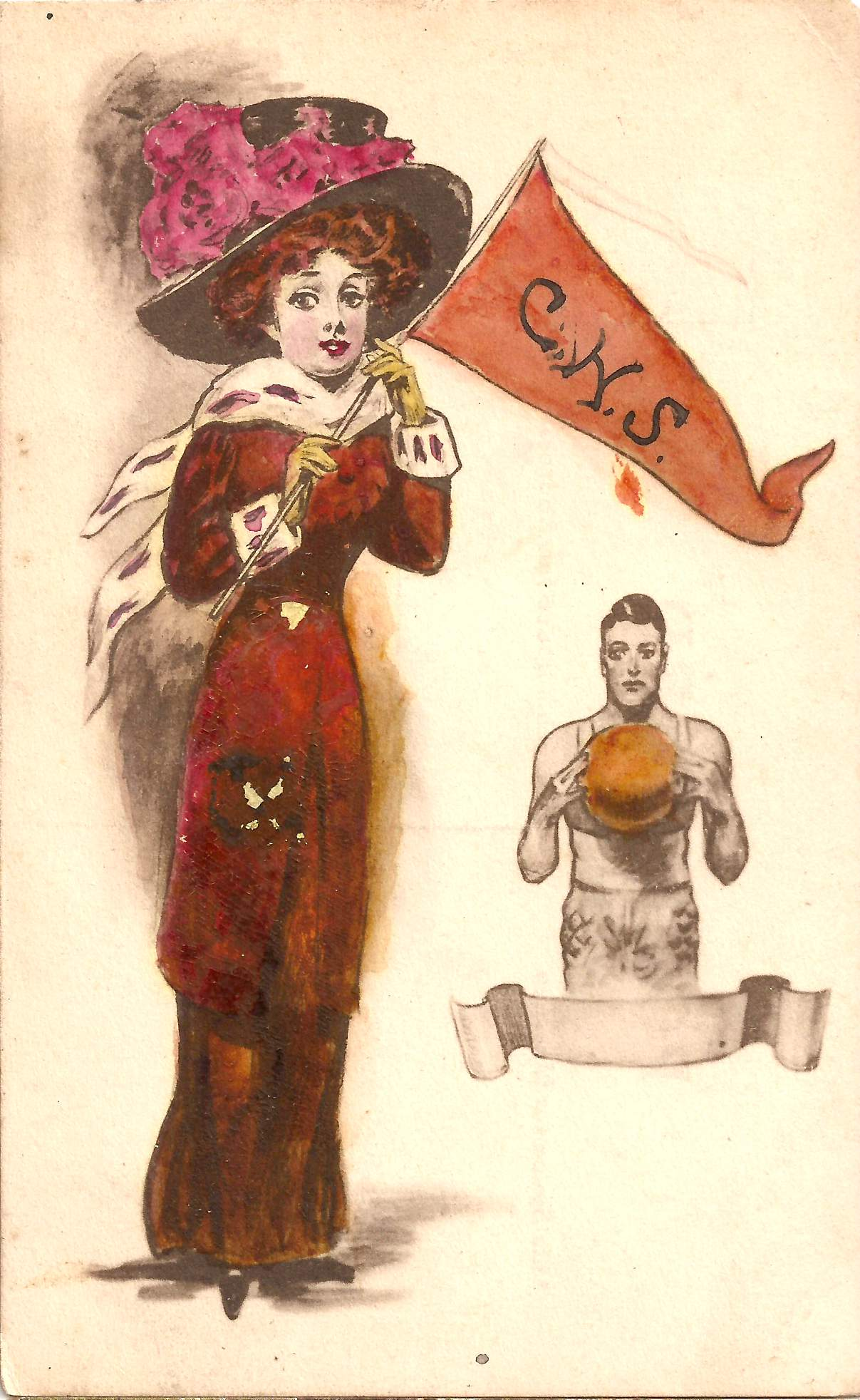
Connellsvile High School post card from the early 1900s.

Connellsville Area SD was created in 1966, merging the Connellsville Joint and Dunbar Township School Districts. Students then utilized the current Junior High East Building until the present building was completed for the beginning of the 1970-71 school year.

== Facilities ==
The present school building is 222,000 square feet (20,600 m^{2}) in size and has a 1400-seat auditorium, a gymnasium of a 1500-person capacity, a 2-story library complete with computer lab, a full size cafeteria and a 6-Lane Natatorium. Outside the school are the district's baseball fields, softball fields, and tennis courts. In 2011, a $41 Million Dollar addition/renovation project took place within several phases. Phases 1 and 2 included renovating and moving the current library, replacing the entire physical plant, which one of two boilers from the original building were out of service, construction of school administrative offices as well as band classrooms, all of which were completed in the spring of 2012. The next phase included demolition and reconstruction of general classrooms, which students at the time were displaced during this phase. During the summer recess of 2012, the dietary department was renovated into a food-court type setting, giving students more food choices. On September 4, 2012, with the closing of Junior High West, the district's ninth-graders began attending the Senior High, making it a Grade 9-12 facility. Also completed at this time was a new science addition as well as technological capabilities, including surround sound within the classrooms. In December 2012, in cooperation with the schools Patriots' Organization, a 4-ton piece of steel from the World Trade Center in New York from the September 11, 2001 attacks, was placed in the school's auditorium lobby. Final renovations to the school were completed in time for the 2013-14 school year, which consisted of renovations to the main gym, pool, locker rooms, technology education classrooms and final site improvements.

== Extracurriculars ==
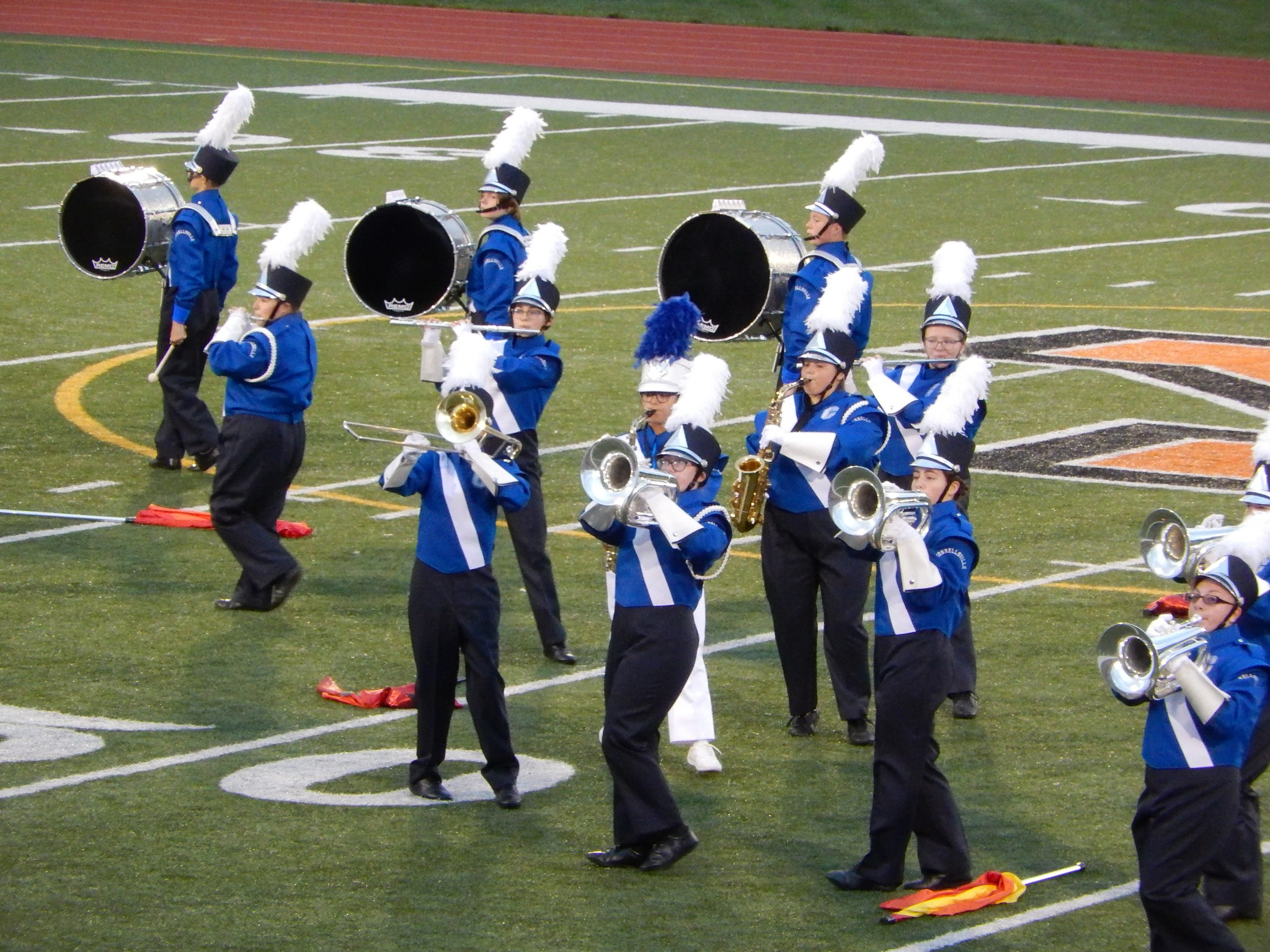
Connellsville's Mighty Falcon Marching Band, 2022

The district offers a wide variety of clubs, activities and an extensive, publicly funded sports program.

=== Athletics ===
Sport name	Boys	Girls
Baseball	Class AAAA	
Basketball	Class AAAA	Class AAAA
Cross country	Class AAA	Class AAA
Football	Class AAAA	
Golf	Class AAAA	
Soccer	Class AAA	Class AAA
Swimming and diving	Class AAA	
Tennis	Class AAA	Class AAA
Track and field	Class AAA	Class AAA
Volleyball		Class AAA
Wrestling	Class AAA	

== Notable alumni ==
- Bob Galasso – professional baseball player
- Al Lujack – professional basketball player for the Washington Capitols
- Johnny Lujack – 1947 Heisman Trophy winner while playing quarterback for the University of Notre Dame
- Wilbert Scott – 1957 professional football player
- John Woodruff – 1936 Olympic gold medalist in 800 meters
