= Bullskin Township/Connellsville Township Joint Sewage Authority =

Agency overview
- Formed: 2003
- Type: municipal authority
- Jurisdiction: Bullskin and Connellsville Townships in Fayette County, Pennsylvania
- Headquarters: 2801 Memorial Boulevard; Connellsville, Pennsylvania

Bullskin Township/Connellsville Township Joint Sewage Authority is a municipal authority providing sewage treatment in Bullskin Township and Connellsville Township in Fayette County, Pennsylvania.

In 2008, an audit of the authority revealed billing irregularities. A year later, the former executive director pleaded guilty to taking "unauthorized payroll disbursements" and taking cash from customers and was sentenced to up to 2 years in prison and ordered to repay $141,000. In 2009, the authority raised sewage rates $2.70, a move that was expected to generate $30,000, which would pay for $36,000 in capital improvements.
