= Wilbert Scott =

American football player (1939–2025)

No. 36, 61, 58
- Position: Linebacker

Personal information
- Born: March 13, 1939; Connellsville, Pennsylvania, U.S.
- Died: July 16, 2025 (aged 86); Montreal, Quebec, Canada
- Listed height: 6 ft 0 in (1.83 m)
- Listed weight: 215 lb (98 kg)

Career information
- High school: Connellsville
- College: Indiana (1957–1960)
- NFL draft: 1961: 16th round, 215th overall pick

Career history
- Pittsburgh Steelers (1961); Philadelphia Eagles (1964)*; Montreal Alouettes (1964–1968); Hamilton Tiger-Cats (1968)
- * Offseason or practice squad member only

Career NFL statistics
- Games played: 4
- Stats at Pro Football Reference

Wilbert James Scott (March 13, 1939 – July 16, 2025) was an American professional football player who was a linebacker for one season with the Pittsburgh Steelers of the National Football League (NFL). Scott was selected in the 1961 NFL draft in the 215th overall pick of the 16th round. He played college football at Indiana University for the Indiana Hoosiers.
