= Paul Graham (American football) =

American football player and coach (1892–1985)

Biographical details
- Born: July 7, 1892; Dayton, Ohio, U.S.
- Died: September 1985 (aged 93)

Playing career
- 1915–1916: Springfield YMCA

Coaching career (HC unless noted)
- 1920–1926: RPI
- 1942–1945: RPI

Paul Seabrook Graham (July 7, 1892 – September 1985) was an American college football player and coach. He served as the head football coach at Rensselaer Polytechnic Institute in Troy, New York from 1920 to 1926 and again from 1942 to 1945.

Graham was a native of Dayton, Ohio and attended the Springfield YMCA Training School (now Springfield College) in Springfield, Massachusetts.
