= Connellsville Township, Pennsylvania =

Township in Pennsylvania, US

Coordinates: 40°01′00″N 79°32′59″W

Connellsville Township
- Township
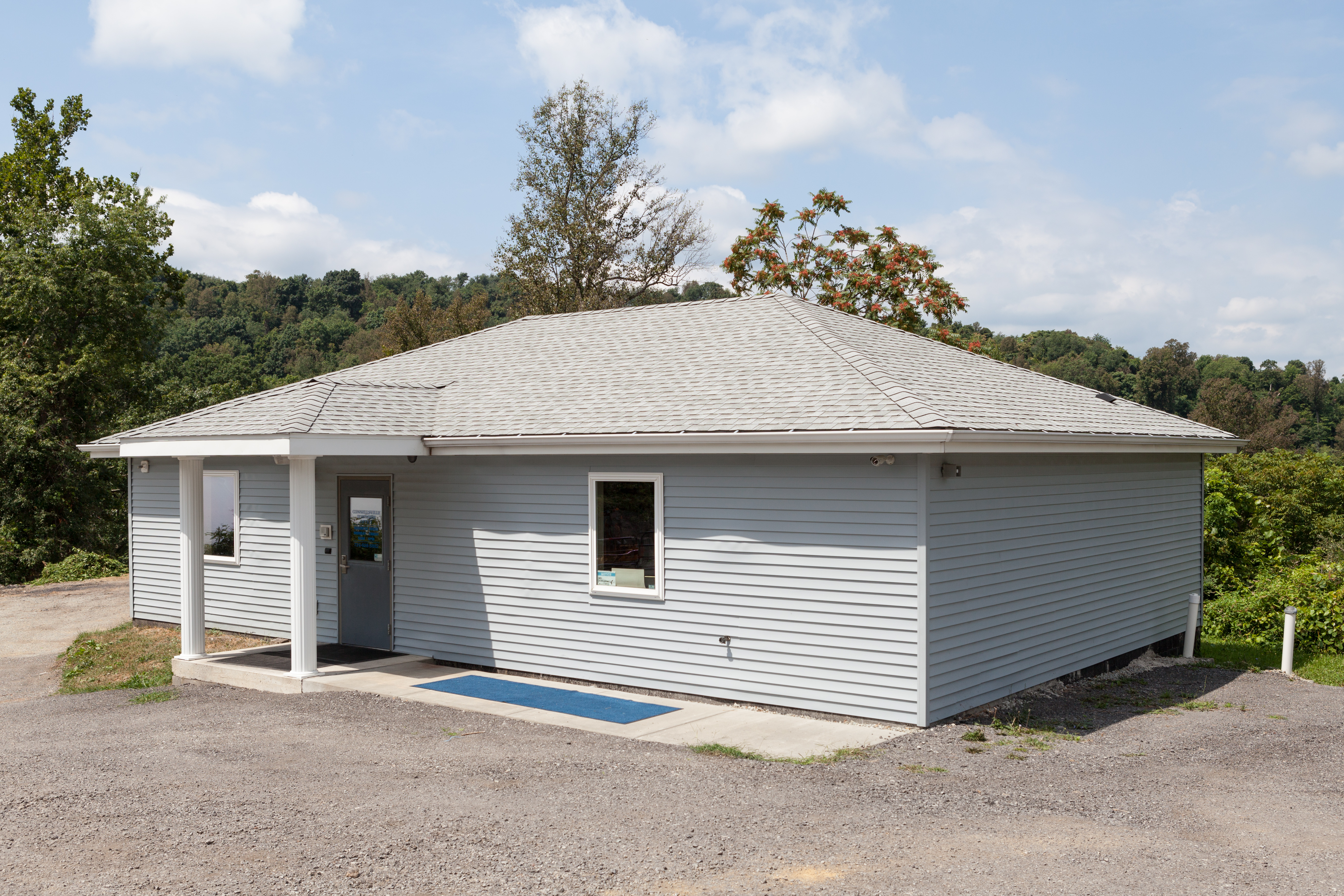

- Logo

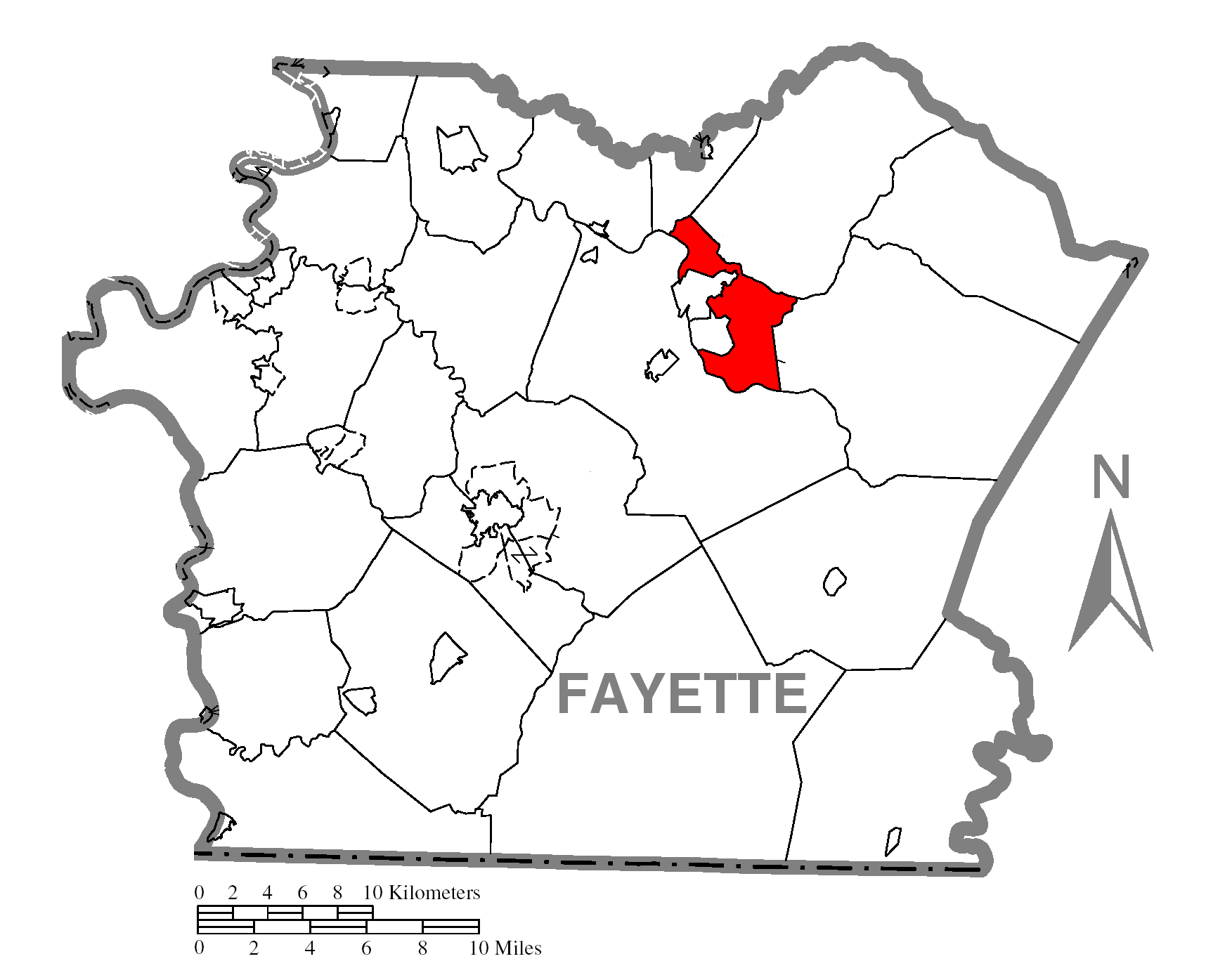
- Location of Connellsville Township in Fayette County

- Location of Fayette County in Pennsylvania
- Country: United States
- State: Pennsylvania
- County: Fayette

Area
  - Total: 11.50 sq mi (29.78 km^{2})
  - Land: 11.35 sq mi (29.39 km^{2})
  - Water: 0.15 sq mi (0.39 km^{2})

Population (2020)
  - Total: 2,073 ▼
  - Estimate (2022): 2,027
  - Density: 202.2/sq mi (78.06/km^{2})
- Time zone: UTC-4 (EST)
  - Summer (DST): UTC-5 (EDT)
- Area code: 724
- FIPS code: 42-051-15784
- Website: cvilletwp.com

Connellsville Township is a township in Fayette County, Pennsylvania, United States. The population was 2,073 at the 2020 census, a decline from the figure of 2,391 tabulated in 2010.

Poplar Grove, Shady Rest, Broadford, Washington Heights, Coldbrook, Sunrise Circle, The Narrows, McCoy, and North Connellsville are neighborhoods within the township.

== Geography ==
Connellsville Township is in northern Fayette County and is bordered to the south and west by the Youghiogheny River, the city of Connellsville, and the borough of South Connellsville. Elevations range from 862 feet (263 m) above sea level in the northwestern corner of the township along the Youghiogheny at Broadford, to 2,320 feet (710 m) along the eastern border of the township at the crest of Chestnut Ridge. According to the United States Census Bureau, the township has a total area of 11.50 square miles (29.78 km^{2}), of which 11.35 square miles (29.39 km^{2}) is land and 0.15 square miles (0.39 km^{2}), or 1.32%, is water.

== Demographics ==
Historical population
Census	Pop.	Note	%±
2010	2,391		—
2020	2,073		−13.3%
2022 (est.)	2,027		−2.2%
U.S. Decennial Census

The Southwestern Pennsylvania Commission provides extensive 2010 Census data regarding Connellsville Township residents.

As of the 2010 census, Connellsville Township resident population had declined to 2,391 people, 1,034 households, and 705 families residing in the township. The population density was 211 inhabitants per square mile (81/km^{2}). There were 1,093 housing units at an average density of 102.3 per square mile (39.5/km^{2}). The racial makeup of the township was 98% White, 0.8% African American, 0.2% American Indian & Alaska Native and 0% Asian, 0.04%.

The median income a family was $50,655. Males had a median income of $41,289 versus $26,350 for females. The per capita income for the township was $21,706. About 18.0% of families and 21% of the population were below the poverty line, including 23% of those under age 18 and 19.0% of those age 64 or over.

2000 census data

As of the 2000 census, there were 2,483 people, 1,032 households, and 725 families residing in the township. The population density was 232.5 inhabitants per square mile (89.8/km^{2}). There were 1,093 housing units at an average density of 102.3 per square mile (39.5/km^{2}). The racial makeup was 99.07% White, 0.60% African American, 0.08% Asian, 0.04% from other races, and 0.20% from two or more races. Hispanic or Latino of any race were 0.12% of the population.

There were 1,032 households, out of which 26.9% had children under the age of 18 living with them, 56.4% were married couples living together, 9.8% had a female householder with no husband present, and 29.7% were non-families. 25.6% of all households were made up of individuals, and 14.1% had someone living alone who was 65 years of age or older. The average household size was 2.40 and the average family size was 2.89.

In the township, the population was spread out, with 20.1% under the age of 18, 7.7% from 18 to 24, 26.3% from 25 to 44, 26.9% from 45 to 64, and 18.8% who were 65 years of age or older. The median age was 43 years. For every 100 females, there were 97.5 males. For every 100 females age 18 and over, there were 92.9 males.

The median income for a household in the township was $32,740, and the median income for a family was $35,404. Males had a median income of $29,095 versus $20,685 for females. The per capita income for the township was $16,860. About 13.0% of families and 14.2% of the population were below the poverty line, including 16.5% of those under age 18 and 12.0% of those age 65 or over.

== See also ==
- Bullskin Township/Connellsville Township Joint Sewage Authority
