= Thomas London =

Thomas, Tom or Tommy London may refer to:

- Tom London (1889–1963), American actor
- Tom London (American football) (born 1954), American football player
- Tom London (magician) (born 1991), close-up magician and radio personality

== See also ==
- Thomas Becket, otherwise known as Thomas of London
