= Landon Robinson =

American football player (born 2003)

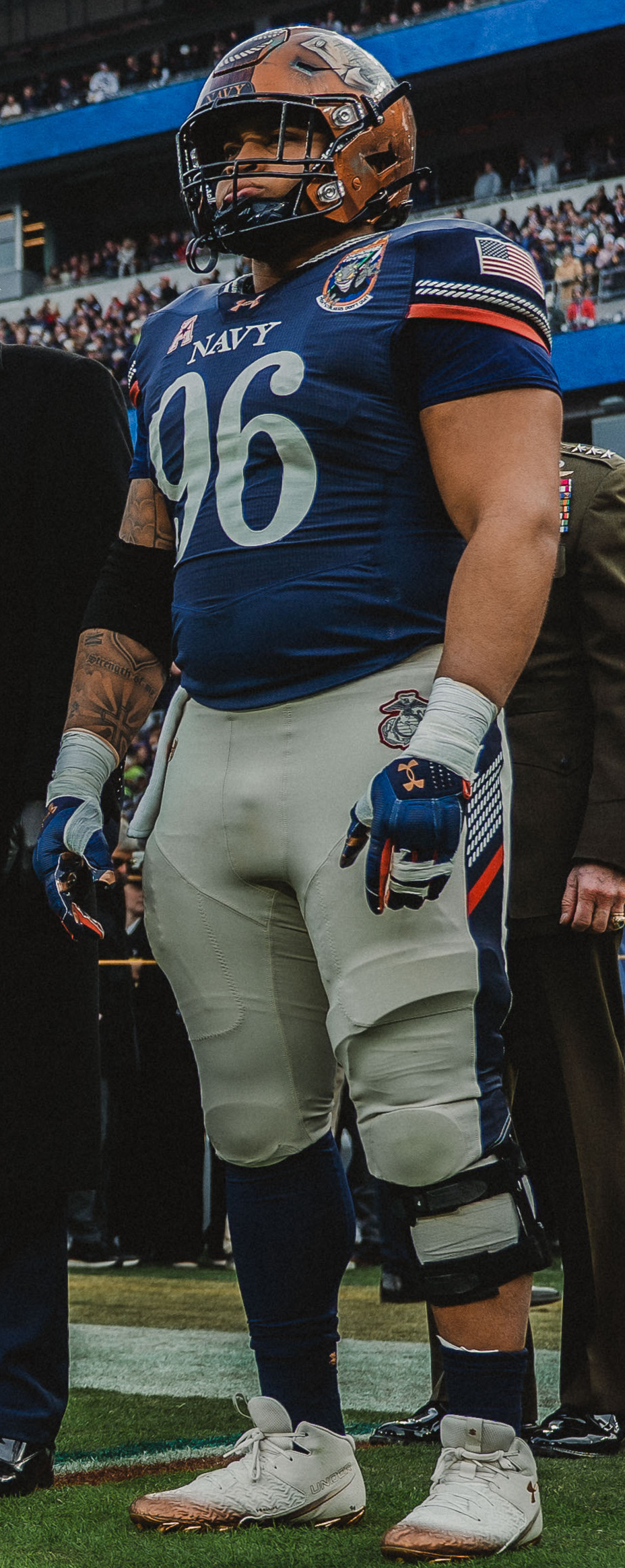
- Robinson with Navy in 2025

No. 96 – Cincinnati Bengals
- Position: Defensive tackle
- Roster status: Active

Personal information
- Born: January 3, 2003 (age 23)
- Listed height: 6 ft 0 in (1.83 m)
- Listed weight: 295 lb (134 kg)

Career information
- High school: Copley (Copley, Ohio)
- College: Navy (2022–2025)
- NFL draft: 2026: 7th round, 226th overall pick

Career history
- Cincinnati Bengals (2026–present)

Awards and highlights
- 2× First-team All-AAC (2024, 2025); First-team All-American (2025); The American Defensive Player of the Year (2025)
- Stats at Pro Football Reference

Landon Miles Robinson (born January 3, 2003) is a United States Marine Corps Reserve officer and professional football defensive tackle for the Cincinnati Bengals of the National Football League (NFL). He played college football for the Navy Midshipmen and was selected by the Bengals in the seventh round of the 2026 NFL draft.

== Early life ==
Robinson attended Copley High School in Copley, Ohio. Coming out of high school, he committed to play college football for the Navy Midshipmen.

== College career ==
During his freshman season in 2022, Robinson did not appear in any games. In 2023, he tallied 28 tackles with four and a half going for a loss, and four sacks. In the 2024 Army–Navy Game, Robinson totaled 13 tackles, as well as rushing for 29 yards on a fake punt, in a 31–13 win over Army. During the 2024 season, he notched 61 tackles with five and a half going for a loss, four sacks, and two forced fumbles, earning first-team all-American Conference honors. For his performance during the 2025 season, Robinson was named the American Conference Defensive Player of the Year, ECAC Defensive Player of the Year, as well as being named First-Team All-American Conference. Robinson was named a First-Team All-American by the Associated Press, Football Writers Association of America, Sports Illustrated and USA Today. He was also named a Second-Team All-American by Walter Camp and The Sporting News.

He studied cyber operations at the Naval Academy.

== Professional career ==
Pre-draft measurables
Height	Weight	Arm length	Hand span	Wingspan	40-yard dash	10-yard split	20-yard split	20-yard shuttle	Three-cone drill	Vertical jump	Broad jump	Bench press
5 ft 11 1/4 in (1.81 m)	293 lb (133 kg)	31 3/4 in (0.81 m)	9 1/8 in (0.23 m)	6 ft 5 1/4 in (1.96 m)	4.91 s	1.65 s	2.76 s	4.48 s	7.28 s	32.5 in (0.83 m)	9 ft 2 in (2.79 m)	30 reps
All values from Pro Day

Robinson was selected by the Cincinnati Bengals in the seventh round with the 226th overall pick of the 2026 NFL draft. He signed his rookie contract on May 8.

== Military career ==
Landon Robinson
- Military career
- Allegiance: United States
- Branch: United States Marine Corps
- Service years: 2026–present
- Rank: Second lieutenant

At his graduation from the Naval Academy, Robinson commissioned as a second lieutenant in the Marine Corps. He intends to serve a ten-year commitment in the Reserve alongside playing in the NFL.

== Personal life ==
Robinson is the son of former Kent State gymnast, Lance Robinson, and mother Patrice Robinson.
