= Robert Williams (defensive back, born 1977) =

American football player (born 1977)

No. 46, 29, 23, 22
- Position: Cornerback

Personal information
- Born: May 29, 1977 (age 49); Shelby, North Carolina, U.S.
- Listed height: 5 ft 10 in (1.78 m)
- Listed weight: 177 lb (80 kg)

Career information
- High school: Shelby (NC)
- College: North Carolina
- NFL draft: 1998: 5th round, 128th overall pick

Career history
- Kansas City Chiefs (1998–1999); San Francisco 49ers (1999); Seattle Seahawks (1999); New Orleans Saints (1999); Carolina Cobras (2001–2003); Georgia Force (2004)

Awards and highlights
- First-team All-ACC (1997); Second-team All-ACC (1996)

Career NFL statistics
- Tackles: 17
- Sacks: 0.5
- Fumble recoveries: 1
- Stats at Pro Football Reference

Career AFL statistics
- Tackles: 33
- Interceptions: 4
- Passes defended: 14
- Stats at ArenaFan.com

Robert M. Williams (born May 29, 1977) is an American former professional football player who was a cornerback in the National Football League (NFL). He was selected by the Kansas City Chiefs in the fifth round of the 1998 NFL draft. Williams played college football for the North Carolina Tar Heels.
