= Shadre Hurst =

American football player

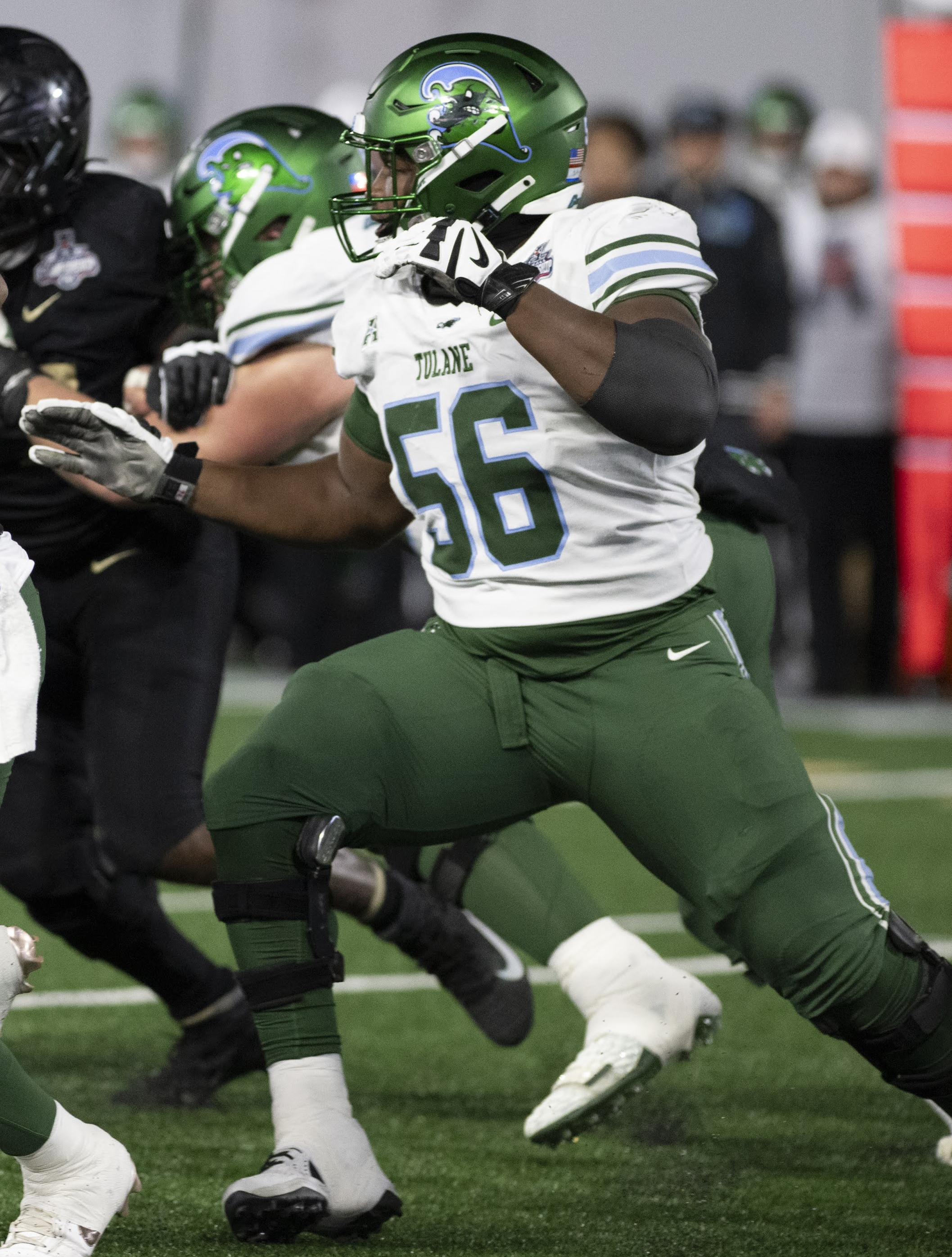
- Hurst with Tulane in the 2024 American Athletic Conference Football Championship Game

No. 56 – Houston Cougars
- Position: Offensive guard
- Class: Redshirt Senior

Personal information
- Listed height: 6 ft 2 in (1.88 m)
- Listed weight: 295 lb (134 kg)

Career information
- High school: Cartersville (Cartersville, Georgia)
- College: Tulane (2022–2025); Houston (2026–present)

Awards and highlights
- 2× First-team All-AAC (2024, 2025)
- Stats at ESPN

Shadre Hurst is an American football offensive lineman for the Houston Cougars. He previously played for the Tulane Green Wave.

== Early life ==
Hurst attended Cartersville High School in Cartersville, Georgia. He committed to play college football for the Tulane Green Wave over other offers from schools such as UMass, Chattanooga, and Washington State.

== College career ==
As a freshman in 2022, Hurst was redshirted. In week 5 of the 2023 season, he made his first career start in a victory over UAB. As a redshirt freshman in 2023, Hurst appeared in all 14 games with 10 starts, earning Freshman All-American honors. During the 2024 season, he appeared in 14 games with 13 starts, where for his performance he earned first-team all-American Conference honors. Heading into the 2025 season, Hurst was named a preseason all-American. After the season, he was named a second-team all-American by the Sporting News. Hurst was considered a top prospect for the 2026 NFL draft.
