= Wade Woodaz =

American football player (born 2004)

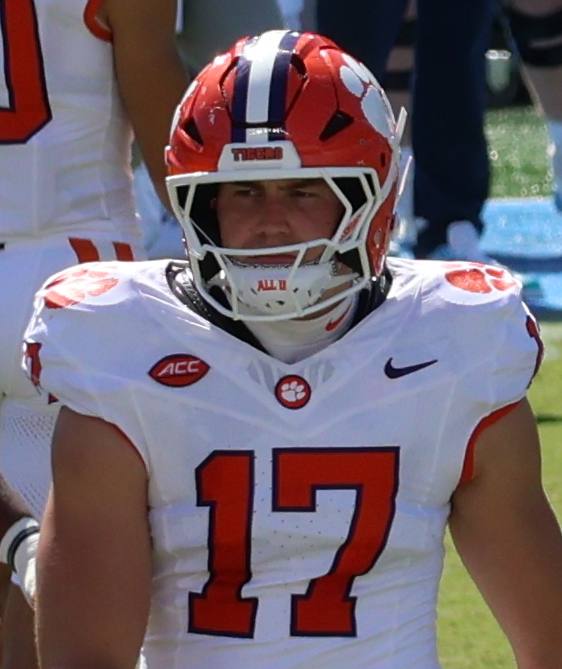
- Woodaz with the Clemson Tigers in 2025

No. 30 – Houston Texans
- Position: Linebacker
- Roster status: Active

Personal information
- Born: February 4, 2004 (age 22); Tampa, Florida U.S.
- Listed height: 6 ft 4 in (1.93 m)
- Listed weight: 235 lb (107 kg)

Career information
- High school: Jesuit (Tampa, Florida)
- College: Clemson (2022–2025)
- NFL draft: 2026: 4th round, 123rd overall pick

Career history
- Houston Texans (2026–present)

Career NFL statistics as of Week 4, 2026
- Tackles: 3
- Stats at Pro Football Reference

Wade Woodaz (born February 4, 2004) is an American professional football linebacker for the Houston Texans of the National Football League (NFL). He played college football for the Clemson Tigers and was selected by the Texans in the fourth round of the 2026 NFL draft.

== Early life ==
Woodaz attended Jesuit High School in Tampa, Florida. He was rated as a three-star recruit and the 37th overall player in the class of 2021. Woodaz committed to play college football for the Clemson Tigers over offers from schools such as Georgia Tech, Iowa, Louisville, and Utah.

== College career ==
In Woodaz's first two seasons in 2022 and 2023, he appeared in 27 games with six starts where he notched 48 tackles with 11.5 being for a loss, five and a half sacks, two pass deflections, and two interceptions. In the 2023 Gator Bowl, Woodaz made a career position switch making the start at middle linebacker and made four tackles in the win.

=== Statistics ===
College statistics
Year	Team	GP	Tackles					Interceptions					Fumbles	
Year	Team	GP	Solo	Ast	Tot	Loss	Sk	Int	Yds	Avg	TD	PD	FF	FR
2022	Clemson	14	9	11	20	5.5	1.5	0	0	—	0	3	1	0
2023	Clemson	13	16	12	28	6.0	4.0	2	94	47.0	1	0	0	1
2024	Clemson	12	43	40	83	10.0	3.0	1	0	0.0	0	5	3	0
2025	Clemson	12	43	27	70	7.0	0.5	0	0	—	0	3	0	0
Career		51	111	90	201	28.5	9.0	3	94	31.3	1	11	4	1

== Professional career ==
Pre-draft measurables
Height	Weight	Arm length	Hand span	Wingspan	40-yard dash	10-yard split	20-yard split	20-yard shuttle	Three-cone drill	Broad jump
6 ft 3 3/8 in (1.91 m)	236 lb (107 kg)	32 5/8 in (0.83 m)	10 in (0.25 m)	6 ft 8 in (2.03 m)	4.56 s	1.55 s	2.66 s	4.50 s	7.27 s	9 ft 9 in (2.97 m)
All values from NFL Combine/Pro Day

Woodaz was selected by the Houston Texans in the fourth round with the 123rd overall pick of the 2026 NFL draft. The selection was received from the Los Angeles Chargers along with the 204th overall pick (Lewis Bond) in exchange for the 117th overall pick (the Chargers selected Travis Burke).

== Personal life ==
Woodaz's brother Drew is also a linebacker for the Clemson Tigers.
