= Alvin Gentry =

American basketball player & coach (born 1954)

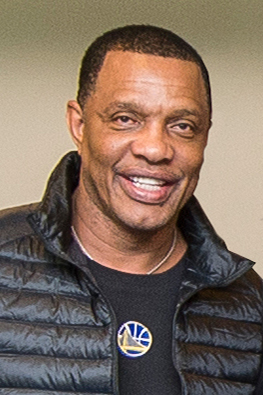
- Gentry in 2015

Sacramento Kings
- Title: Vice president of basketball engagement
- League: NBA

Personal information
- Born: November 5, 1954 (age 72) Shelby, North Carolina, U.S.
- Listed height: 6 ft 4 in (1.93 m)
- Listed weight: 218 lb (99 kg)

Career information
- High school: Shelby (Shelby, North Carolina)
- College: Appalachian State (1973–1977)
- Position: Shooting guard
- Coaching career: 1980–2022

Career history

Coaching
- 1980–1981: Baylor (assistant)
- 1981–1986: Colorado (assistant)
- 1986–1988: Kansas (assistant)
- 1988–1990: San Antonio Spurs (assistant)
- 1990–1991: Los Angeles Clippers (assistant)
- 1991–1995: Miami Heat (assistant)
- 1995: Miami Heat (interim)
- 1995–1997: Detroit Pistons (assistant)
- 1998–1999: Detroit Pistons
- 2000–2003: Los Angeles Clippers
- 2003–2004: New Orleans Hornets (assistant)
- 2004–2008: Phoenix Suns (assistant)
- 2008–2012: Phoenix Suns
- 2013–2014: Los Angeles Clippers (associate HC)
- 2014–2015: Golden State Warriors (associate HC)
- 2015–2020: New Orleans Pelicans
- 2020–2021: Sacramento Kings (associate HC)
- 2021–2022: Sacramento Kings (interim HC)

Career highlights
- As assistant coach: NBA champion (2015); NCAA champion (1988)

Alvin Harris Gentry (born November 5, 1954) is an American professional basketball executive who is the vice president of basketball engagement for the Sacramento Kings of the National Basketball Association (NBA). A former basketball player and coach, Gentry has served as the head coach of six NBA teams. He served as an interim head coach for the Miami Heat at the end of the 1994–95 season, and later coached the Detroit Pistons, Los Angeles Clippers, Phoenix Suns, New Orleans Pelicans, and Kings.

== Early and personal life ==
Gentry was born in Shelby, North Carolina, where he grew up and attended Shelby High School. His first cousin is former NC State and NBA star David Thompson.

Gentry played college basketball at Appalachian State University, where he was a point guard under Press Maravich and Bobby Cremins. In 1978 he spent one year as a graduate assistant at the University of Colorado. After one year working in private business, he returned to the bench when he received his first full-time collegiate assistant coaching job at Baylor University under Jim Haller in 1980. After one year at Baylor, Gentry returned to the University of Colorado as an assistant coach from 1981 to 1986 under Tom Apke. From 1986 to 1989, Gentry served as an assistant at the University of Kansas under Larry Brown, where they won the 1988 NCAA National Championship.

Gentry has been married twice and is the father of two sons and one daughter.

== Coaching career ==
=== Early career ===
In 1989, Gentry began his NBA coaching career as an assistant coach for the San Antonio Spurs under Larry Brown.

Gentry joined Gregg Popovich, R. C. Buford, and Ed Manning as part of Larry Brown's assistant coaching staff for the Spurs when Brown left Kansas before the 1988–89 NBA season. After two seasons in San Antonio, Gentry left to become an assistant for the Los Angeles Clippers beginning in the 1990–91 season.

=== Miami Heat and Detroit Pistons ===
For the 1991 season Gentry joined Kevin Loughery's staff as an assistant coach for the Miami Heat, where he coached for three seasons. He then moved to Detroit following the 1994–95 season where he served as an assistant for two and a half seasons before being named head coach late in the 1997–98 season.

=== Los Angeles Clippers ===
Gentry returned to San Antonio as head assistant coach following the 1999–2000 season, where he was reunited with former co-assistants Gregg Popovich (the Spurs head coach and vice president of basketball operations) and R .C. Buford (the Spurs' general manager). But that assignment was brief, as Gentry accepted the head coaching position for the Los Angeles Clippers weeks after taking the San Antonio job. He led the Clippers to 31 wins and 39 wins respectively in his first two seasons as their head coach. Those seasons were marked by the solid play of young players, such as Darius Miles, Elton Brand and Lamar Odom. In Gentry's third season, however, the team regressed (despite the addition of Andre Miller), and Gentry was fired in March 2003, following a run of five consecutive defeats. His final record as Clippers head coach stood at 89–133.

=== Phoenix Suns ===
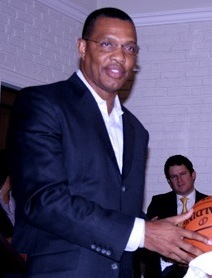
Gentry in 2009

Gentry later became an assistant coach for the Phoenix Suns for six years, serving under head coaches Mike D'Antoni and Terry Porter. When Porter was fired in his first season as head coach, Alvin Gentry took over on an interim basis.

Gentry was named Suns' head coach on a permanent basis for the 2009–10 season. Gentry's record in his first year as head coach during the 2009–2010 season was 54 wins, a career high, against 28 losses. In the postseason, the Suns finally overcame the San Antonio Spurs in a sweep, ending a streak of playoff eliminations at the hands of the Spurs. Gentry figured out how to blend the two styles of D'Antoni and Porter. Comparing his coaching to D'Antoni, Gentry said "We are not seven seconds or less. We're 12 seconds or under. We don't take a lot of really quick shots. We don't play with that breakneck pace. We play with a rhythm." Spurs head coach Gregg Popovich remarked "One thing about Phoenix is they are better defensively than in the past. They're much more active, much more committed, they've taken responsibility to a much more significant degree than ever before." Gentry became the fifth head coach to lead the Suns to the Western Conference finals in his first full season. In the Western Conference Finals, the Suns lost a six game series to the defending champions Lakers, featuring superstar Kobe Bryant and coached by Phil Jackson.

On January 18, 2013, Gentry mutually parted ways with the Phoenix Suns.

=== Los Angeles Clippers (second stint) ===
In July 2013, he returned to the Clippers organization, taking the title of associate head coach, making him Doc Rivers' lead assistant.

=== Golden State Warriors ===
After one season with the Clippers, Gentry was hired as associate head coach for the Golden State Warriors, working under new head coach Steve Kerr.

=== New Orleans Pelicans ===
On May 30, 2015, Gentry was named the head coach of the New Orleans Pelicans. prior to the start of the 2015 NBA Finals, but was to remain with Golden State until the series was completed. The Warriors won the NBA Championship after they defeated the Cleveland Cavaliers in six games to give Gentry his first NBA championship.

On August 15, 2020, after a disappointing performance in the NBA Bubble following the resumption of the 2019–20 season, Gentry was fired as the Pelicans' coach. He was 175–225 in five seasons. Often plagued by injuries, New Orleans used 140 starting lineups in that span, 11 more than the next-closest team in the league. Gentry left the Pelicans with the second-most wins in franchise history behind Byron Scott and was their only coach with a winning post-season record (5–4).

=== Sacramento Kings ===
On October 6, 2020, Gentry was named the associate head coach of the Sacramento Kings. On November 21, 2021, Gentry was named the interim head coach of the Kings following the dismissal of Luke Walton. On April 11, 2022, he was fired by the Kings.

Following his dismissal as head coach, Gentry was retained by the Sacramento Kings as the vice president of basketball engagement.

== Head coaching record ==
Legend
Regular season	G	Games coached	W	Games won	L	Games lost	W–L %	Win–loss %
Playoffs	PG	Playoff games	PW	Playoff wins	PL	Playoff losses	PW–L %	Playoff win–loss %

Team	Year	G	W	L	W–L%	Finish	PG	PW	PL	PW–L%	Result
Miami	1994–95	36	15	21	.417	4th in Atlantic	—	—	—	—	Missed playoffs
Detroit	1997–98	37	16	21	.432	6th in Central	—	—	—	—	Missed playoffs
Detroit	1998–99	50	29	21	.580	3rd in Central	5	2	3	.400	Lost in First round
Detroit	1999–00	58	28	30	.483	(fired)	—	—	—	—	—
L.A. Clippers	2000–01	82	31	51	.378	6th in Pacific	—	—	—	—	Missed playoffs
L.A. Clippers	2001–02	82	39	43	.476	5th in Pacific	—	—	—	—	Missed playoffs
L.A. Clippers	2002–03	58	19	39	.328	(fired)	—	—	—	—	—
Phoenix	2008–09	31	18	13	.581	2nd in Pacific	—	—	—	—	Missed playoffs
Phoenix	2009–10	82	54	28	.659	2nd in Pacific	16	10	6	.625	Lost in Conference finals
Phoenix	2010–11	82	40	42	.488	2nd in Pacific	—	—	—	—	Missed playoffs
Phoenix	2011–12	66	33	33	.500	3rd in Pacific	—	—	—	—	Missed playoffs
Phoenix	2012–13	41	13	28	.317	(fired)	—	—	—	—	—
New Orleans	2015–16	82	30	52	.366	5th in Southwest	—	—	—	—	Missed playoffs
New Orleans	2016–17	82	34	48	.415	4th in Southwest	—	—	—	—	Missed playoffs
New Orleans	2017–18	82	48	34	.585	2nd in Southwest	9	5	4	.556	Lost in Conference semifinals
New Orleans	2018–19	82	33	49	.402	4th in Southwest	—	—	—	—	Missed playoffs
New Orleans	2019–20	72	30	42	.417	5th in Southwest	—	—	—	—	Missed playoffs
Sacramento	2021–22	65	24	41	.369	5th in Pacific	—	—	—	—	Missed playoffs
Career		1,170	534	636	.456		30	17	13	.567	
