= Travis Burke =

American football player (born 2003)

- Burke in 2026

No. 77 – Los Angeles Chargers
- Position: Offensive tackle
- Roster status: Active

Personal information
- Born: January 6, 2003 (age 23)
- Listed height: 6 ft 9 in (2.06 m)
- Listed weight: 315 lb (143 kg)

Career information
- High school: South Broward (Hollywood, Florida)
- College: Gardner–Webb (2021–2022); FIU (2023–2024); Memphis (2025)
- NFL draft: 2026: 4th round, 117th overall pick

Career history
- Los Angeles Chargers (2026–present)

Awards and highlights
- First-team All-the American (2025)

Career NFL statistics as of Week 4, 2026
- Games played: 4
- Stats at Pro Football Reference

Travis Burke (born January 6, 2003) is an American professional football offensive tackle for the Los Angeles Chargers of the National Football League (NFL). He played college football for the Gardner–Webb Runnin' Bulldogs, the FIU Panthers and the Memphis Tigers. Burke was selected by the Chargers in the fourth round of the 2026 NFL draft.

== Early life ==
Burke was born on January 6, 2003, and grew up in Florida. His father played football at South Broward High School and later for the Bethune–Cookman Wildcats, afterwards serving as South Broward's offensive line coach. Burke attended South Broward and played football and baseball. In football, he was an offensive tackle, defensive lineman and long snapper. After initially being considered undersized, Burke had a growth spurt and grew 10 inches to a height of 6 feet 6 inches (1.98 m) prior to his junior year. The team made the Class 7A state playoffs in his junior season, while his senior year was shortened due to the COVID-19 pandemic. A three-star recruit, he committed to play college football for the NCAA Division I FCS-level Gardner–Webb Runnin' Bulldogs.

== College career ==
Burke played for Gardner–Webb during the 2021 and 2022 seasons. He redshirted as a true freshman in 2021, appearing in one game, and then started 13 games in 2022 – eight at left tackle and five at right tackle. Following his time with the Runnin' Bulldogs, he transferred to the FIU Panthers. In two seasons with the Panthers, he started 22 games. Burke then transferred again to the Memphis Tigers in 2025 and played his final season of eligibility there, earning first-team All-American Conference honors. In his lone season with the Tigers, he started 11 games at right tackle, missing two due to injury. He concluded his collegiate career with 46 games started. Burke was invited to the 2026 East–West Shrine Bowl and participated at the 2026 NFL Scouting Combine.

== Professional career ==
Pre-draft measurables
Height	Weight	Arm length	Hand span	Wingspan	40-yard dash	10-yard split	20-yard split	Vertical jump	Broad jump	Bench press
6 ft 8 3/4 in (2.05 m)	325 lb (147 kg)	34 1/4 in (0.87 m)	10 1/8 in (0.26 m)	6 ft 11 1/8 in (2.11 m)	5.17 s	1.79 s	2.98 s	27.0 in (0.69 m)	8 ft 11 in (2.72 m)	24 reps
All values from NFL Combine/Pro Day

Burke was selected by the Los Angeles Chargers in the fourth round (117th overall) of the 2026 NFL draft. The selection was received from the Houston Texans in exchange for the Chargers' 123rd (Wade Woodaz) and 204th (Lewis Bond) overall picks.
