= Shelby High School (North Carolina) =

American public school in North Carolina

Location
- 230 E Dixon Blvd; Shelby, North Carolina 28152; United States; 35°16′30″N 81°32′16″W

Information
- School type: Public
- Founded: 1877 (149 years ago)
- School district: Cleveland County Schools
- CEEB code: 343600
- Principal: Eli Wortman
- Teaching staff: 53.37 (FTE)
- Grades: 9–12
- Enrollment: 790 (2023-2024)
- Student to teacher ratio: 14.80
- Colors: Black and gold
- Athletics: Football, Soccer, Tennis, Volleyball, Cheerleading, Cross Country, Basketball, Swimming, Wrestling, Baseball, Softball, Track & Field, Golf
- Mascot: Golden Lion
- Team name: Golden Lions
- Website: shs.clevelandcountyschools.org

Shelby High School is a public high school located at 230 E Dixon Blvd in Shelby, North Carolina. The mascot of the school is the Golden Lion.

== History ==
Shelby High School was first mentioned in local newspapers of the time as being established in June 1877, by Professor J.A. Smith, with G.W. Sharpe and Miss Laura Sharp as instructors. Shelby moved to its current high school building location in 1960, with the dedication of the school being held on September 10, 1961.

== Notable alumni ==
- Bill Champion, MLB pitcher
- Moe Davis, retired U.S. Air Force colonel
- Gabe DeVoe, professional basketball player
- Eddie Dodson, bank robber known as the New York Yankees Bandit
- Alvin Gentry, NBA coach
- Santana Hopper, college football defensive tackle for the Colorado Buffaloes
- Tom London, NFL cornerback
- Roger McKee, MLB pitcher
- Charlotte Smith, professional women's basketball player and current college coach
- Cliff Washburn, American football player
- Jim Washburn, NFL coach
- George Watts, NFL offensive tackle
- Robert Williams, NFL defensive back
- Tom Wright, MLB outfielder
