= Copley High School =

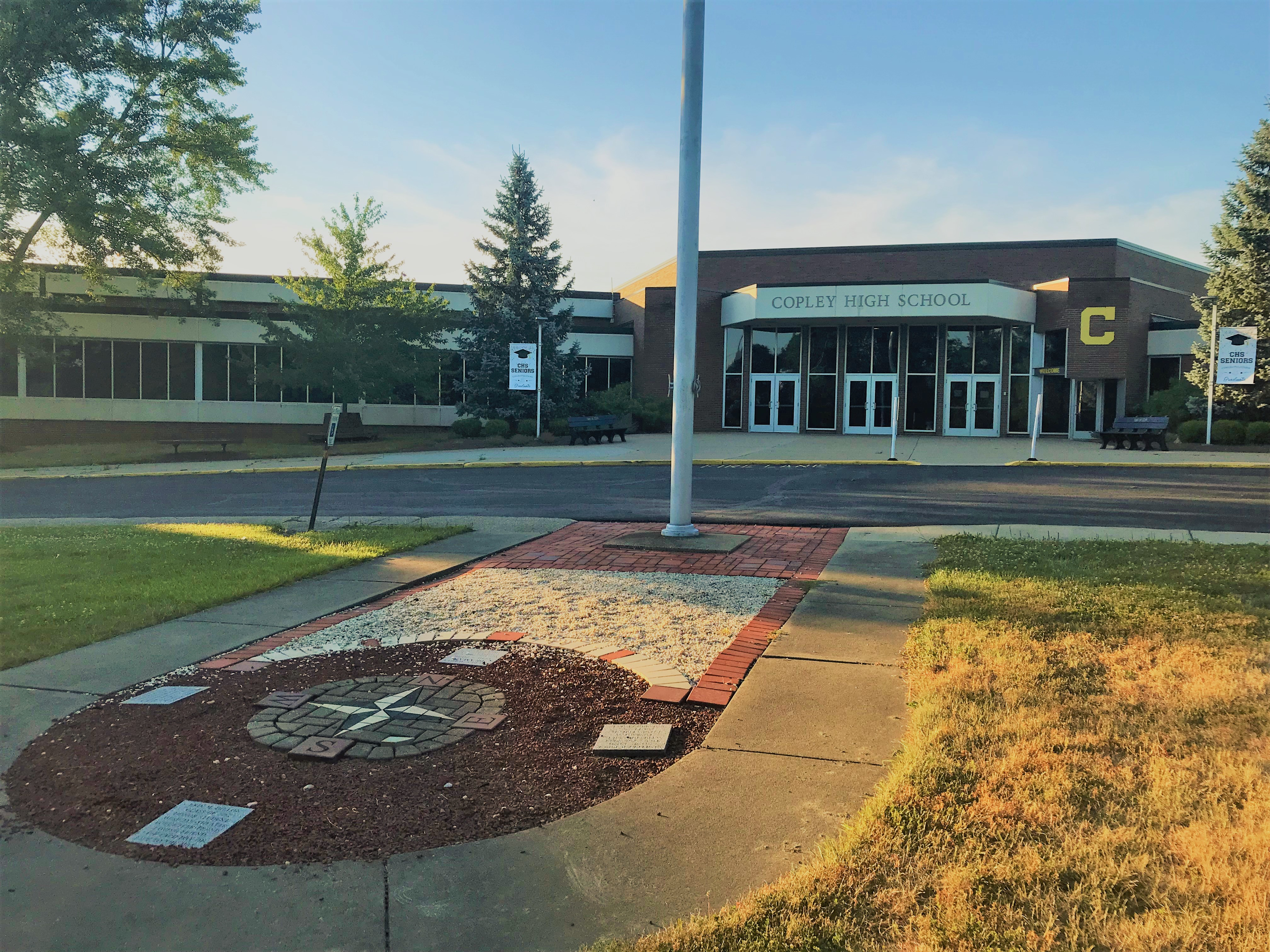

Location
- 3797 Ridgewood Road; Akron, Ohio 44321; United States

Information
- Type: Public
- School district: Copley–Fairlawn City School District
- Principal: Dylan Ruff
- Teaching staff: 67.00 (FTE)
- Grades: 9–12
- Enrollment: 945 (2023–2024)
- Student to teacher ratio: 14.10
- Colors: Blue and gold
- Fight song: Across the Field
- Team name: Indians
- Newspaper: Drumbeat
- Yearbook: Chieftain
- Website: www.copley-fairlawn.org/chs

Copley High School is a public high school in Copley Township, just west of Akron, Ohio, United States. It is the only high school in the Copley–Fairlawn City School District and competes athletically in the American Division of the Suburban League. The school's colors are blue and gold. The fight song is Ohio State's "Across the Field". The school's main rival is Revere High School, with whom they play against annually for the a trophy called "The Bell" during the 5th game of their football season.

== State championships ==
- Boys soccer – 1994
- Boys golf – 2003
- Girls soccer – 2022

== Notable alumni ==
- Delone Carter, professional football player in the National Football League (NFL)
- Carrie Coon, Broadway, film, and television actress
- Elizabeth Franz (nee Frankovitch), stage and television actress
- Jeff Golub, guitarist, played jazz, rock, blues, and smooth jazz
- Riley Grant, professional soccer player in United League Soccer
- Denise Johns, professional beach volleyball player
- Frank LaRose, politician
- Landon Robinson, professional football player in the NFL
- Angela Salem, professional soccer player and coach in Women's Premier Soccer League
- Jeff Tabaka, professional baseball player in Major League Baseball
- Josh Williams, a professional soccer player in Major League Soccer
