= 2025 American Conference football season =

- League: NCAA Division I Football Bowl Subdivision
- Sport: Football
- Duration: August 28, 2025–December 13, 2025
- Teams: 14
- TV partner(s): ABC, ESPN, ESPN2, ESPNU, and CBS Sports Network

2026 NFL draft
- Top draft pick: Travis Burke
- Picked by: Los Angeles Chargers

Regular season
- Season champions: Tulane
- Runners-up: North Texas

American Conference Championship Game
- Date: December 5, 2025
- Venue: Yulman Stadium, New Orleans, LA
- Champions: Tulane
- Runners-up: North Texas

Seasons
- ← 2024 2026 →

2025 American Conference football standings
	Conf.			Overall
Team	W		L	W		L
No. 18 Tulane y$^	7	–	1	11	–	3
No. 24 North Texas y	7	–	1	12	–	2
No. 23 Navy	7	–	1	11	–	2
South Florida	6	–	2	9	–	4
East Carolina	6	–	2	9	–	4
Memphis	4	–	4	8	–	5
Army	4	–	4	7	–	6
UTSA	4	–	4	7	–	6
Temple	3	–	5	5	–	7
Florida Atlantic	3	–	5	4	–	8
Rice	2	–	6	5	–	8
UAB	2	–	6	4	–	8
Tulsa	1	–	7	4	–	8
Charlotte	0	–	8	1	–	11
Championship: Tulane 34, North Texas 21
^ – College Football Playoff participant; $ – Conference champion; y – Championship game participant; Rankings from AP Poll

The 2025 American Conference football season is the 34th NCAA Division I FBS Football season of the American Conference, known before July 21, 2025 as the American Athletic Conference (AAC). It is the 13th season for the conference after the breakup of the former Big East Conference (whose charter legally belongs to the American), and the 11th season of the College Football Playoff in place. The American is considered a member of the Group of Five (G5) together with Conference USA, the MAC, Mountain West Conference and the Sun Belt Conference. The conference has 14 football members for the 2025–26 season.

The conference was officially renamed "American Conference" on July 21, 2025, as part of a comprehensive brand initiative. The American's new website went live on July 24, coinciding with the conference's football media days.

== Head coaches ==
- On October 20, 2024, East Carolina announced that it had fired head coach Mike Houston, citing that changes were needed to "move the program forward". Defensive coordinator Blake Harrell was named the interim head coach. Harrell was promoted to the permanent head coach on November 25. 2024.
- On October 27, 2024, Rice announced that it had fired head coach Mike Bloomgren. Bloomgren had posted a 24–52 record with the school during his tenure. On November 26, 2024, Rice announced the Scott Abell would be the new head coach for the 2025 season. Abell was previously head coach at Davidson
- On November 17, 2024, Temple announced that they had fired head coach Stan Drayton. Drayton had posted a 9–25 record in 3 years with the school. On December 1, 2024, Temple announced K. C. Keeler as the new head coach. Keeler had previously been head coach at Sam Houston.
- On November 18, 2024, Florida Atlantic announced that it had fired head coach Tom Herman. On December 2, 2024, FAU announced Zach Kittley as the new head coach. Kittley had previously been the offensive coordinator at Texas Tech.
- On November 18, 2024, Charlotte announced that it had fired head coach Biff Poggi after less than two seasons at the school. On December 7, 2024, Charlotte announced Tim Albin as the new head coach for 2024. Albin had previously been head coach of Ohio.
- On November 24, 2024, Tulsa announced it had fired head coach Kevin Wilson. On December 8, 2024, Tulsa announced Tre Lamb as the new head coach for 2025. Lamb had previously been head coach at East Tennessee State.

=== Records ===
Team	Head coach	Years at school	Overall record	Record at school	AAC record
Army	Jeff Monken	12	120–73 (.622)	82–57 (.590)	8–0 (1.000)
Charlotte	Tim Albin	1	58–27 (.682)	0–0 (–)	0–0 (–)
East Carolina	Blake Harrell	2	5–1 (.833)	5–1 (.833)	4–1 (.800)
Florida Atlantic	Zach Kittley	1	0–0 (–)	0–0 (–)	0–0 (–)
Memphis	Ryan Silverfield	6	42–21 (.667)	42–21 (.667)	23–17 (.575)
Navy	Brian Newberry	3	15–10 (.600)	15–10 (.600)	10–6 (.625)
North Texas	Eric Morris	3	35–32 (.522)	11–14 (.440)	6–10 (.375)
Rice	Scott Abell	1	86–52 (.623)	0–0 (–)	0–0 (–)
South Florida	Alex Golesh	3	14–12 (.538)	14–12 (.538)	8–8 (.500)
Temple	K. C. Keeler	1	271–112–1 (.707)	0–0 (–)	0–0 (–)
Tulane	Jon Sumrall	2	32–9 (.780)	9–5 (.643)	7–1 (.875)
Tulsa	Tre Lamb	1	27–25 (.519)	0–0 (–)	0–0 (–)
UAB	Trent Dilfer	3	7–17 (.292)	7–17 (.292)	6–11 (.353)
UTSA	Jeff Traylor	6	46–20 (.697)	46–20 (.697)	11–5 (.688)

Note:

- Records shown after the 2024 season
- Years at school includes 2025 season

=== Mid-season changes ===
- On October 12, UAB announced that it had fired Trent Dilfer. Dilfer had posted a 9–21 record with the school during his tenure. Offensive coordinator Alex Mortensen was named the interim head coach for the remainder of the season.

=== Post-season changes ===
- On November 25, North Texas's head coach Eric Morris was announced as the next head coach of Oklahoma State in the Big 12 Conference beginning in 2026. Morris will continue to coach North Texas for the remainder of 2025, including any bowl game.

== Rankings ==
		Pre	Wk 1	Wk 2	Wk 3	Wk 4	Wk 5	Wk 6	Wk 7	Wk 8	Wk 9	Wk 10	Wk 11	Wk 12	Wk 13	Wk 14	Wk 15	Final
Army	AP	RV	—	—	—	—	—	—	—	—	—	—	—	—	—	—	—	—
Army	C	RV	—	—	—	—	—	—	—	—	—	—	—	—	—	—	—	RV
Army	CFP	Not released										—	—	—	—	—	—	
Charlotte	AP	—	—	—	—	—	—	—	—	—	—	—	—	—	—	—	—	—
Charlotte	C	—	—	—	—	—	—	—	—	—	—	—	—	—	—	—	—	—
Charlotte	CFP	Not released										—	—	—	—	—	—	
East Carolina	AP	—	—	—	—	—	—	—	—	—	—	—	—	RV	—	—	—	—
East Carolina	C	—	—	—	—	—	—	—	—	—	—	—	—	RV	—	—	—	RV
East Carolina	CFP	Not released										—	—	—	—	—	—	
Florida Atlantic	AP	—	—	—	—	—	—	—	—	—	—	—	—	—	—	—	—	—
Florida Atlantic	C	—	—	—	—	—	—	—	—	—	—	—	—	—	—	—	—	—
Florida Atlantic	CFP	Not released										—	—	—	—	—	—	
Memphis	AP	RV	RV	RV	—	RV	RV	23	22	—	25	22	RV	—	—	—	—	—
Memphis	C	RV	RV	RV	RV	RV	RV	25	20	RV	25	23	RV	—	—	—	—	—
Memphis	CFP	Not released										—	—	—	—	—	—	
Navy	AP	RV	RV	RV	RV	—	—	RV	RV	RV	RV	—	—	RV	RV	23	22	23
Navy	C	RV	RV	RV	RV	RV	RV	RV	RV	RV	23	RV	RV	RV	RV	25	25	23
Navy	CFP	Not released										—	—	—	—	—	—	
North Texas	AP	—	—	—	—	RV	RV	RV	—	—	RV	RV	RV	22	21	20	23	24
North Texas	C	—	—	—	—	RV	RV	RV	—	RV	RV	RV	RV	23	22	20	RV	RV
North Texas	CFP	Not released										—	—	—	—	24	25	
Rice	AP	—	—	—	—	—	—	—	—	—	—	—	—	—	—	—	—	—
Rice	C	—	—	—	—	—	—	—	—	—	—	—	—	—	—	—	—	—
Rice	CFP	Not released										—	—	—	—	—	—	
South Florida	AP	—	RV	18	RV	RV	RV	24	19	18	RV	RV	25	RV	RV	RV	RV	—
South Florida	C	—	RV	23	RV	RV	RV	RV	23	20	RV	RV	RV	—	RV	RV	RV	—
South Florida	CFP	Not released										—	24	—	—	—	—	
Temple	AP	—	—	—	—	—	—	—	—	—	—	—	—	—	—	—	—	—
Temple	C	—	—	—	—	—	—	—	—	—	—	—	—	—	—	—	—	—
Temple	CFP	Not released										—	—	—	—	—	—	
Tulane	AP	RV	RV	RV	RV	—	—	—	RV	RV	RV	—	RV	24	22	21	17	18
Tulane	C	RV	RV	RV	RV	RV	RV	RV	RV	RV	RV	RV	RV	25	23	21	18	18
Tulane	CFP	Not released										—	—	24	24	20	20	
Tulsa	AP	—	—	—	—	—	—	—	—	—	—	—	—	—	—	—	—	—
Tulsa	C	—	—	—	—	—	—	—	—	—	—	—	—	—	—	—	—	—
Tulsa	CFP	Not released										—	—	—	—	—	—	
UAB	AP	—	—	—	—	—	—	—	—	—	—	—	—	—	—	—	—	—
UAB	C	—	—	—	—	—	—	—	—	—	—	—	—	—	—	—	—	—
UAB	CFP	Not released										—	—	—	—	—	—	
UTSA	AP	—	—	—	—	—	—	—	—	—	—	—	—	—	—	—	—	—
UTSA	C	—	—	—	—	—	—	—	—	—	—	—	—	—	—	—	—	—
UTSA	CFP	Not released										—	—	—	—	—	—	

Legend
	Improvement in ranking
	Drop in ranking
	Not ranked previous week
	No change in ranking from previous week
RV	Received votes but were not ranked in Top 25 of poll
т	Tied with team above or below also with this symbol

== Schedule ==
The 2025 season was released on February 28.

Index to colors and formatting
American member won
American member lost
American teams in **bold**

=== Week 1 ===
Date	Time	Visiting team	Home team	Site	TV	Result	Attendance	Ref.
August 28	5:30 p.m.	No. 25 Boise State	**South Florida**	Raymond James Stadium • Tampa, FL	ESPN	**W** 34–7	34,707	
August 28	7:00 p.m.	**East Carolina**	NC State	Carter–Finley Stadium • Raleigh, NC (rivalry)	ACCN	**L** 17–24	56,919	
August 28	8:30 p.m.	Alabama State	**UAB**	Protective Stadium • Birmingham, AL	ESPN+	**W** 52–42	26,294	
August 29	6:00 p.m.	No. 10 (FCS) Tarleton State	**Army**	Michie Stadium • West Point, NY	CBSSN	**L** 27–30 ^{2OT}	23,032	
August 29	7:00 p.m.	Appalachian State	**Charlotte**	Bank of America Stadium • Charlotte, NC (Duke's Mayo Classic)	ESPNU	**L** 11–34	35,718	
August 30	12:00 p.m.	Northwestern	**Tulane**	Yulman Stadium • New Orleans, LA	ESPNU	**W** 23–3	22,103	
August 30	12:00 p.m.	VMI	**Navy**	Navy–Marine Corps Memorial Stadium • Annapolis, MD	CBSSN	**W** 52–7	30,014	
August 30	12:00 p.m.	**Florida Atlantic**	Maryland	SECU Stadium • College Park, MD	BTN	**L** 7–39	35,067	
August 30	3:30 p.m.	**Temple**	UMass	McGuirk Alumni Stadium • Hadley, MA	ESPN+	**W** 42–10	11,565	
August 30	4:30 p.m.	Chattanooga	**Memphis**	Simmons Bank Liberty Stadium • Memphis, TN	ESPN+	**W** 45–10	25,011	
August 30	7:00 p.m.	**UTSA**	No. 19 Texas A&M	Kyle Field • College Station, TX	ESPN	**L** 24–42	107,521	
August 30	8:00 p.m.	Lamar	**North Texas**	DATCU Stadium • Denton, TX	ESPN+	**W** 51–0	20,594	
August 30	8:00 p.m.	**Rice**	Louisiana	Cajun Field • Lafayette, LA	ESPN+	**W** 14–12	22,148	
August 30	8:00 p.m.	No. 16 (FCS) Abilene Christian	**Tulsa**	Skelly Field at H. A. Chapman Stadium • Tulsa, OK	ESPN+	**W** 35–7	17,337	
^{#}Rankings from AP Poll released prior to game. All times are in Eastern Time.

=== Week 2 ===
Date	Time	Visiting team	Home team	Site	TV	Result	Attendance	Ref.
September 6	2:00 p.m.	Howard	**Temple**	Lincoln Financial Field • Philadelphia, PA	ESPN+	**W** 55–7	15,655	
September 6	3:30 p.m.	Texas State	**UTSA**	Alamodome • San Antonio, TX (I-35 Rivalry)	ESPN+	**L** 36–43	45,778	
September 6	3:30 p.m.	**UAB**	**Navy**	Navy–Marine Corps Memorial Stadium • Annapolis, MD	CBSSN	**NAVY** 38–24	28,325	
September 6	3:30 p.m.	**North Texas**	Western Michigan	Waldo Stadium • Kalamazoo, MI	ESPN+	**W** 33–30 ^{OT}	20,051	
September 6	4:15 p.m	**South Florida**	No. 13 Florida	Ben Hill Griffin Stadium • Gainesville, FL	SECN	**W** 18–16	89,909	
September 6	6:00 p.m.	Campbell	**East Carolina**	Dowdy–Ficklen Stadium • Greenville, NC	ESPN+	**W** 56–3	35,120	
September 6	6:00 p.m.	Florida A&M	**Florida Atlantic**	Flagler Credit Union Stadium • Boca Raton, FL	ESPN+	**W** 56–14	21,029	
September 6	7:00 p.m.	**Army**	Kansas State	Bill Snyder Family Football Stadium • Manhattan, KS	ESPN	**W** 24–21	52,723	
September 6	7:00 p.m.	North Carolina	**Charlotte**	Jerry Richardson Stadium • Charlotte, NC	ESPN+	**L** 3–20	19,233	
September 6	7:00 p.m.	Houston	**Rice**	Rice Stadium • Houston, TX (rivalry)	ESPN+	**L** 9–35	30,116	
September 6	7:00 p.m.	**Memphis**	Georgia State	Center Parc Stadium • Atlanta, GA	ESPN+	**W** 38–16	13,625	
September 6	7:00 p.m.	**Tulane**	South Alabama	Hancock Whitney Stadium • Mobile, AL	ESPN+	**W** 33–31	16,871	
September 6	9:00 p.m.	**Tulsa**	New Mexico State	Aggie Memorial Stadium • Las Cruces, NM	ESPN+	**L** 14–21	10,240	
^{#}Rankings from AP Poll released prior to game. All times are in Eastern Time.

=== Week 3 ===
Date	Time	Visiting team	Home team	Site	TV	Result	Attendance	Ref.
September 13	12:00 p.m.	No. 13 Oklahoma	**Temple**	Lincoln Financial Field • Philadelphia, PA	ESPN2	**L** 3–42	24,927	
September 13	12:00 p.m.	**Memphis**	Troy	Veterans Memorial Stadium • Troy, AL	ESPNU	**W** 28–7	23,384	
September 13	3:30 p.m.	Washington State	**North Texas**	DATCU Stadium • Denton, TX	ESPNU	**W** 59–10	26,837	
September 13	3:30 p.m.	No. 14 (FCS) Incarnate Word	**UTSA**	Alamodome • San Antonio, TX	ESPN+	**W** 48–20	20,421	
September 13	4:30 p.m.	No. 18 **South Florida**	No. 5 Miami (FL)	Hard Rock Stadium • Miami Gardens, FL	The CW	**L** 12–49	66,591	
September 13	6:00 p.m.	No. 20 (FCS) Monmouth	**Charlotte**	Jerry Richardson Stadium • Charlotte, NC	ESPN+	**W** 42–35	15,681	
September 13	7:00 p.m.	Prairie View A&M	**Rice**	Rice Stadium • Houston, TX	ESPN+	**W** 38–17	22,260	
September 13	7:30 p.m.	**East Carolina**	Coastal Carolina	Brooks Stadium • Conway, SC	ESPN+	**W** 38–0	21,634	
September 13	8:00 p.m.	Duke	**Tulane**	Yulman Stadium • New Orleans, LA	ESPN2	**W** 34–27	30,000	
September 13	8:00 p.m.	**Navy**	**Tulsa**	Skelly Field at H. A. Chapman Stadium • Tulsa, OK	ESPN+	**NAVY** 42–23	20,103	
September 13	8:30 p.m.	**Florida Atlantic**	FIU	Pitbull Stadium • Miami, FL (Shula Bowl)	ESPN+	**L** 28–38	17,638	
September 13	8:30 p.m.	Akron	**UAB**	Protective Stadium • Birmingham, AL	ESPN+	**W** 31–28	17,823	
^{#}Rankings from AP Poll released prior to game. All times are in Eastern Time.

=== Week 4 ===
Date	Time	Visiting team	Home team	Site	TV	Result	Attendance	Ref.
September 18	7:30 p.m.	**Rice**	**Charlotte**	Jerry Richardson Stadium • Charlotte, NC	ESPN	**RICE** 28–17	13,397	
September 19	7:30 p.m.	**Tulsa**	Oklahoma State	Boone Pickens Stadium • Stillwater, OK (rivalry)	ESPN	**W** 19–12	48,842	
September 20	12:00 p.m.	Arkansas	**Memphis**	Simmons Bank Liberty Stadium • Memphis, TN	ABC	**W** 32–31	39,861	
September 20	12:00 p.m.	**North Texas**	**Army**	Michie Stadium • West Point, NY	CBSSN	**UNT** 45–38 ^{OT}	28,446	
September 20	12:00 p.m.	South Carolina State	**South Florida**	Raymond James Stadium • Tampa, FL	ESPN+	**W** 63–14	28,461	
September 20	12:45 p.m.	**UAB**	No. 15 Tennessee	Neyland Stadium • Knoxville, TN	SECN	**L** 24–56	101,915	
September 20	3:30 p.m.	**Tulane**	No. 13 Ole Miss	Vaught–Hemingway Stadium • University, MS (rivalry)	ESPN	**L** 10–45	65,644	
September 20	5:05 p.m.	**Temple**	No. 18 Georgia Tech	Bobby Dodd Stadium • Atlanta, GA	The CW	**L** 24–45	45,123	
September 20	7:30 p.m.	BYU	**East Carolina**	Dowdy–Ficklen Stadium • Greenville, NC	ESPN2	**L** 13–34	47,213	
September 20	9:30 p.m.	**UTSA**	Colorado State	Canvas Stadium • Fort Collins, CO	FS1	**W** 17–16	32,061	
^{#}Rankings from AP Poll released prior to game. All times are in Eastern Time.

=== Week 5 ===
Date	Time	Visiting team	Home team	Site	TV	Result	Attendance	Ref.
September 25	7:30 p.m.	**Army**	**East Carolina**	Dowdy–Ficklen Stadium • Greenville, NC	ESPN	**ECU** 28–6	32,497	
September 27	12:00 p.m.	South Alabama	**North Texas**	DATCU Stadium • Denton, TX	ESPNU	**W** 36–22	16,575	
September 27	3:30 p.m.	**Rice**	**Navy**	Navy–Marine Corps Memorial Stadium • Annapolis, MD	CBSSN	**NAVY** 21–13	28,873	
September 27	4:00 p.m.	**Tulane**	**Tulsa**	Skelly Field at H. A. Chapman Stadium • Tulsa, OK	ESPNU	**TULN** 31–14	16,311	
September 27	7:00 p.m.	**Memphis**	**Florida Atlantic**	Flagler Credit Union Stadium • Boca Raton, FL	ESPN2	**MEM** 55–26	17,733	
^{#}Rankings from AP Poll released prior to game. All times are in Eastern Time.

=== Week 6 ===
Date	Time	Visiting team	Home team	Site	TV	Result	Attendance	Ref.
October 3	7:00 p.m.	**Charlotte**	South Florida	Raymond James Stadium • Tampa, FL	ESPN2	**USF** 54–26	34,577	
October 4	12:00 p.m.	**Army**	UAB	Protective Stadium • Birmingham, AL	ESPNU	**ARMY** 31–13	22,489	
October 4	12:00 p.m.	Air Force	Navy	Navy–Marine Corps Memorial Stadium • Annapolis, MD (Commander-in-Chief's Trophy)	CBS	**W** 34–31	37,517	
October 4	1:00 p.m.	**UTSA**	Temple	Lincoln Financial Field • Philadelphia, PA	ESPN+	**TEM** 27–21	12,132	
October 4	7:00 p.m.	**Florida Atlantic**	Rice	Rice Stadium • Houston, TX	ESPN+	**FAU** 27–21	22,999	
October 4	8:00 p.m.	**Tulsa**	Memphis	Simmons Bank Liberty Stadium • Memphis, TN	ESPNU	**MEM** 45–7	27,303	
^{#}Rankings from AP Poll released prior to game. All times are in Eastern Time.

=== Week 7 ===
Date	Time	Visiting team	Home team	Site	TV	Result	Attendance	Ref.
October 9	7:30 p.m.	**East Carolina**	Tulane	Yulman Stadium • New Orleans, LA	ESPN	**TULN** 26–19	20,035	
October 10	7:30 p.m.	No. 24 **South Florida**	North Texas	DATCU Stadium • Denton, TX	ESPN2	**USF** 63–36	31,386	
October 11	12:00 p.m.	**Charlotte**	Army	Michie Stadium • West Point, NY	CBSSN	**ARMY** 24–7	31,172	
October 11	4:00 p.m.	**Navy**	Temple	Lincoln Financial Field • Philadelphia, PA	ESPN2	**NAVY** 32–31	26,149	
October 11	6:00 p.m.	**UAB**	Florida Atlantic	Flagler Credit Union Stadium • Boca Raton, FL	ESPN+	**FAU** 53–33	20,052	
October 11	7:30 p.m.	**Rice**	UTSA	Alamodome • San Antonio, TX	ESPNU	**UTSA** 61–13	22,058	
^{#}Rankings from AP Poll released prior to game. All times are in Eastern Time.

=== Week 8 ===
Date	Time	Visiting team	Home team	Site	TV	Result	Attendance	Ref.
October 16	7:30 p.m.	**Tulsa**	**East Carolina**	Dowdy–Ficklen Stadium • Greenville, NC	ESPN	**ECU** 41–27	31,307	
October 18	12:00 p.m.	**Army**	**Tulane**	Yulman Stadium • New Orleans, LA	ESPNU	**TULN** 24–17	20,027	
October 18	3:30 p.m.	**UTSA**	**North Texas**	DATCU Stadium • Denton, TX	ESPN+	**UNT** 55–17	25,053	
October 18	3:30 p.m.	**Temple**	**Charlotte**	Jerry Richardson Stadium • Charlotte, NC	ESPN+	**TEM** 49–14	13,618	
October 18	4:00 p.m.	No. 22 **Memphis**	**UAB**	Protective Stadium • Birmingham, AL (Battle for the Bones)	ESPN2	**UAB** 31–24	19,037	
October 18	7:30 p.m.	**Florida Atlantic**	No. 19 **South Florida**	Raymond James Stadium • Tampa, FL	ESPNU	**USF** 48–13	45,169	
^{#}Rankings from AP Poll released prior to game. All times are in Eastern Time.

=== Week 9 ===
Date	Time	Visiting team	Home team	Site	TV	Result	Attendance	Ref.
October 24	7:00 p.m.	**North Texas**	**Charlotte**	Jerry Richardson Stadium • Charlotte, NC	ESPN2	**UNT** 54–20	9,629	
October 25	12:00 p.m.	No. 18 **South Florida**	**Memphis**	Simmons Bank Liberty Stadium • Memphis, TN	ESPN2	**MEM** 34–31	30,940	
October 25	3:00 p.m.	UConn	**Rice**	Rice Stadium • Houston, TX	ESPN+	**W** 37–34 ^{2OT}	21,122	
October 25	3:30 p.m.	**Florida Atlantic**	**Navy**	Navy–Marine Corps Memorial Stadium • Annapolis, MD	CBSSN	**NAVY** 42–32	32,175	
October 25	3:30 p.m.	**Temple**	**Tulsa**	Skelly Field at H. A. Chapman Stadium • Tulsa, OK	ESPN+	**TEM** 38–37 ^{OT}	16,403	
^{#}Rankings from AP Poll released prior to game. All times are in Eastern Time.

=== Week 10 ===
Date	Time	Visiting team	Home team	Site	TV	Result	Attendance	Ref.
October 30	7:30 p.m.	**Tulane**	**UTSA**	Alamodome • San Antonio, TX	ESPN	**UTSA** 48–26	16,715	
October 31	7:00 p.m.	No. 25 **Memphis**	**Rice**	Rice Stadium • Houston, TX	ESPN2	**MEM** 38–14	20,197	
November 1	12:00 p.m.	**Navy**	**North Texas**	DATCU Stadium • Denton, TX	ESPN2	**UNT** 31–17	26,516	
November 1	12:00 p.m.	**Army**	Air Force	Falcon Stadium • USAF Academy, CO (Commander-in-Chief's Trophy)	CBS	**W** 20–17	39,441	
November 1	12:00 p.m.	**UAB**	UConn	Rentschler Field • East Hartford, CT	CBSSN	**L** 19–38	23,170	
November 1	2:00 p.m.	**East Carolina**	**Temple**	Lincoln Financial Field • Philadelphia, PA	ESPN+	**ECU** 45–14	13,168	
^{#}Rankings from AP Poll released prior to game. All times are in Eastern Time.

=== Week 11 ===
Date	Time	Visiting team	Home team	Site	TV	Result	Attendance	Ref.
November 6	7:30 p.m.	UTSA	**South Florida**	Raymond James Stadium • Tampa, FL	ESPN	**USF** 55–23	27,437	
November 7	9:00 p.m.	Tulane	**Memphis**	Simmons Bank Liberty Stadium • Memphis, TN	ESPN	**TULN** 38–32	30,384	
November 8	12:00 p.m.	Temple	**Army**	Michie Stadium • West Point, NY	CBSSN	**ARMY** 14–13	30,594	
November 8	2:00 p.m.	UAB	**Rice**	Rice Stadium • Houston, TX	ESPN+	**RICE** 24–17	22,671	
November 8	3:00 p.m.	Charlotte	**East Carolina**	Dowdy–Ficklen Stadium • Greenville, NC	ESPN+	**ECU** 48–22	39,096	
November 8	3:00 p.m.	Tulsa	**Florida Atlantic**	Flagler Credit Union Stadium • Boca Raton, FL	ESPN+	**FAU** 40–21	16,170	
November 8	7:30 p.m.	Navy	No. 10 Notre Dame	Notre Dame Stadium • Notre Dame, IN (rivalry)	NBC	**L** 10–49	77,622	
^{#}Rankings from College Football Playoff. All times are in Eastern Time.

=== Week 12 ===
Date	Time	Visiting team	Home team	Site	TV	Result	Attendance	Ref.
November 15	12:00 p.m.	No. 24 **South Florida**	Navy	Navy–Marine Corps Memorial Stadium • Annapolis, MD	ESPN2	**NAVY** 41–38	34,856	
November 15	12:00 p.m.	**UTSA**	Charlotte	Jerry Richardson Stadium • Charlotte, NC	ESPN+	**UTSA** 28–7	9,831	
November 15	1:00 p.m.	Oregon State	Tulsa	Skelly Field at H. A. Chapman Stadium • Tulsa, OK	ESPN+	**W** 31–14	15,034	
November 15	2:00 p.m.	**North Texas**	UAB	Protective Stadium • Birmingham, AL	ESPN+	**UNT** 53–24	16,190	
November 15	4:00 p.m.	**Memphis**	East Carolina	Dowdy–Ficklen Stadium • Greenville, NC	ESPNU	**ECU** 31–27	37,348	
November 15	4:00 p.m.	**Florida Atlantic**	Tulane	Yulman Stadium • New Orleans, LA	ESPN+	**TULN** 35–24	30,000	
^{#}Rankings from College Football Playoff. All times are in Eastern Time.

=== Week 13 ===
Date	Time	Visiting team	Home team	Site	TV	Result	Attendance	Ref.
November 22	12:00 p.m.	**Tulsa**	**Army**	Michie Stadium • West Point, NY	CBSSN	**TLSA** 26–25	28,705	
November 22	12:45 p.m.	**Charlotte**	Georgia	Sanford Stadium • Athens, Georgia	SECN	**L** 3–35	93,033	
November 22	3:00 p.m.	**South Florida**	**UAB**	Protective Stadium • Birmingham, AL	ESPN+	**USF** 48–18	16,376	
November 22	3:00 p.m	UConn	**Florida Atlantic**	Flagler Credit Union Stadium • Boca Raton, FL	ESPN+	**L** 45–48	16,306	
November 22	3:30 p.m.	**East Carolina**	**UTSA**	Alamodome • San Antonio, TX	ESPN+	**UTSA** 58–24	18,573	
November 22	3:45 p.m.	No. 24 **Tulane**	**Temple**	Lincoln Financial Field • Philadelphia, PA	ESPNU	**TULN** 37–13	13,366	
November 22	7:30 p.m.	**North Texas**	**Rice**	Rice Stadium • Houston, TX	ESPNU	**UNT** 56–24	24,598	
^{#}Rankings from College Football Playoff. All times are in Eastern Time.

=== Week 14 ===
Date	Time	Visiting team	Home team	Site	TV	Result	Attendance	Ref.
November 27	7:30 p.m.	Navy	Memphis	Simmons Bank Liberty Stadium • Memphis, TN	ESPN	**NAVY** 28–17	27,082	
November 28	3:30 p.m.	Temple	North Texas	DATCU Stadium • Denton, TX	ESPN	**UNT** 52–25	24,492	
November 29	12:00 p.m.	East Carolina	Florida Atlantic	Flagler Credit Union Stadium • Boca Raton, FL	ESPN+	**ECU** 42–3	14,712	
November 29	3:00 p.m.	UAB	Tulsa	Skelly Field at H. A. Chapman Stadium • Tulsa, OK	ESPN+	**UAB** 31–24	13,026	
November 29	3:30 p.m.	Army	UTSA	Alamodome • San Antonio, TX	ESPN+	**ARMY** 27–24	22,620	
November 29	7:00 p.m.	Rice	South Florida	Raymond James Stadium • Tampa, FL	ESPN+	**USF** 52–3	28,813	
November 29	7:30 p.m.	Charlotte	Tulane	Yulman Stadium • New Orleans, LA	ESPNU	**TULN** 27–0	22,245	
^{#}Rankings from College Football Playoff. All times are in Eastern Time.

=== Conference Championship Game ===
Date	Time	Visiting team	Home team	Site	TV	Result	Attendance	Ref.
December 5	8:00 p.m.	**North Texas**	**Tulane**	Yulman Stadium • New Orleans, LA	ABC	**TULN** 34–21	23,986	
^{#}Rankings from College Football Playoff. All times are in Eastern Time.

=== Week 16 ===
Date	Time	Visiting team	Home team	Site	TV	Result	Attendance	Ref.
December 13	3:00 p.m.	**Army**	**Navy**	M&T Bank Stadium • Baltimore, MD (126th Army–Navy Game, Commander-in-Chief's Trophy)	CBS	**NAVY** 17–16		
^{#}Rankings from College Football Playoff. All times are in Eastern Time.

== Postseason ==
=== Bowl Games ===
Legend
American win
American loss

Bowl game	Date	Site	Television	Time (EST)	American team	Opponent	Score	Attendance
Cure Bowl	December 17	Camping World Stadium • Orlando, FL	ESPN	5:00 p.m.	South Florida	Old Dominion	L 10–24	15,036
Gasparilla Bowl	December 19	Raymond James Stadium • Tampa, FL	ESPN	2:30 p.m.	Memphis	NC State	L 7–31	13,336
First Responder Bowl	December 26	Gerald J. Ford Stadium • Dallas, TX	ESPN	8:00 p.m.	UTSA	FIU	W 57–20	8,671
Military Bowl	December 27	Navy–Marine Corps Memorial Stadium • Annapolis, MD	ESPN	11:00 a.m.	East Carolina	Pittsburgh	W 23–17	17,016
Fenway Bowl	December 27	Fenway Park • Boston, MA	ESPN	2:15 p.m.	Army	UConn	W 41–16	22,461
New Mexico Bowl	December 27	University Stadium • Albuquerque, NM	ESPN	5:45 p.m.	North Texas	San Diego State	W 49–47	18,867
Armed Forces Bowl	January 2, 2026	Amon G. Carter Stadium • Fort Worth, TX	ESPN	1:00 p.m.	Rice	Texas State	L 10-41	28,243
Liberty Bowl	January 2, 2026	Simmons Bank Liberty Stadium • Memphis, TN	ESPN	4:30 p.m.	Navy	Cincinnati	W 35-13	21,908
College Football Playoff bowl games
College Football Playoff (First round)	December 20	Vaught–Hemingway Stadium • Oxford, MS	TNT	3:30 p.m.	Tulane	Ole Miss	L 10–41	68,251

== Records vs. other conferences ==
2025–2026 records against non-conference foes:

Regular season

Power Four Conferences	Record
ACC	1–4
Big 12	2–2
Big Ten	1–1
Notre Dame	0–1
SEC	2–5
Power 4 Total	6–13
Other FBS Conferences	Record
CUSA	0–2
Independents (Excluding Notre Dame)	1–2
MAC	3–0
Mountain West	4–0
Pac-12	2–0
Sun Belt	6–2
Other FBS Total	16–6
FCS Opponents	Record
Football Championship Subdivision	12–1
Total Non-Conference Record	34–20

=== American vs Power 4 matchups ===
This is a list of games the American has scheduled versus power conference teams (ACC, Big Ten, Big 12, Notre Dame and SEC). All rankings are from the current AP Poll at the time of the game.

Date	Conference	Visitor	Home	Site	Score
August 28	ACC	East Carolina	NC State	Carter–Finley Stadium • Raleigh, NC	L 17–24
August 30	Big Ten	Florida Atlantic	Maryland	SECU Stadium • College Park, MD	L 7–39
August 30	Big Ten	Northwestern	Tulane	Yulman Stadium • New Orleans, LA	W 23–2
August 30	SEC	UTSA	Texas A&M	Kyle Field • College Station, TX	L 24–42
September 6	Big 12	Army	Kansas State	Bill Snyder Family Football Stadium • Manhattan, KS	W 24–21
September 6	ACC	North Carolina	Charlotte	Jerry Richardson Stadium • Charlotte, NC	L 3–20
September 6	Big 12	Houston	Rice	Rice Stadium • Houston, TX	L 9–35
September 6	SEC	South Florida	Florida	Ben Hill Griffin Stadium • Gainesville, FL	W 18–16
September 13	ACC	South Florida	Miami (FL)	Hard Rock Stadium • Miami Gardens, FL	L 12–49
September 13	SEC	Oklahoma	Temple	Lincoln Financial Field • Philadelphia, PA	L 3–42
September 13	ACC	Duke	Tulane	Yulman Stadium • New Orleans, LA	W 34–27
September 19	Big 12	Tulsa	Oklahoma State	Boone Pickens Stadium • Stillwater, OK	W 19–12
September 20	Big 12	BYU	East Carolina	Dowdy–Ficklen Stadium • Greenville, NC	L 13–34
September 20	SEC	UAB	Tennessee	Neyland Stadium • Knoxville, TN	L 24–56
September 20	SEC	Arkansas	Memphis	Simmons Bank Liberty Stadium • Memphis, TN	W 32–31
September 20	ACC	Temple	Georgia Tech	Bobby Dodd Stadium • Atlanta, GA	L 24–45
September 20	SEC	Tulane	Ole Miss	Vaught–Hemingway Stadium • Oxford, MS	L 10–45
November 8	Independent	Navy	Notre Dame	Notre Dame Stadium • Notre Dame, IN	L 10–49
November 22	SEC	Charlotte	Georgia	Sanford Stadium • Athens, Georgia	L 3–35

=== American vs other FBS matchups ===
The following games include American teams competing against teams from CUSA, the MAC, Mountain West, Pac-12 or Sun Belt.

Date	Conference	Visitor	Home	Site	Score
August 28	Mountain West	Boise State	South Florida	Raymond James Stadium • Tampa, FL	W 34–7
August 29	Sun Belt	Appalachian State	Charlotte	Bank of America Stadium • Charlotte, NC	L 11–34
August 30	Sun Belt	Rice	Louisiana	Cajun Field • Lafayette, LA	W 14–12
August 30	MAC	Temple	UMass	McGuirk Alumni Stadium • Hadley, MA	W 42–10
September 6	Sun Belt	Memphis	Georgia State	Center Parc Stadium • Atlanta, GA	W 38–16
September 6	MAC	North Texas	Western Michigan	Waldo Stadium • Kalamazoo, MI	W 33–30 ^{OT}
September 6	Sun Belt	Tulane	South Alabama	Hancock Whitney Stadium • Mobile, AL	W 33–31
September 6	C-USA	Tulsa	New Mexico State	Aggie Memorial Stadium • Las Cruces, NM	L 14–21
September 6	Sun Belt	Texas State	UTSA	Alamodome • San Antonio, TX	L 36–43
September 13	MAC	Akron	UAB	Protective Stadium • Birmingham, AL	W 31–28
September 13	Sun Belt	East Carolina	Coastal Carolina	Brooks Stadium • Conway, SC	W 38–0
September 13	C-USA	Florida Atlantic	FIU	Pitbull Stadium • Miami, FL	L 28–38
September 13	Sun Belt	Memphis	Troy	Veterans Memorial Stadium • Troy, AL	W 28–7
September 13	Pac-12	Washington State	North Texas	DATCU Stadium • Denton, TX	W 59–10
September 20	Mountain West	UTSA	Colorado State	Canvas Stadium • Fort Collins, CO	W 17–16
September 27	Sun Belt	South Alabama	North Texas	DATCU Stadium • Denton, TX	W 36–22
October 4	Mountain West	Air Force	Navy	Navy–Marine Corps Memorial Stadium • Annapolis, MD	W 21–13
November 1	Mountain West	Army	Air Force	Falcon Stadium • Colorado Springs, CO	W 20–17
November 15	Pac-12	Oregon State	Tulsa	Skelly Field at H. A. Chapman Stadium • Tulsa, OK	W 31–14

=== American vs FBS independents matchups ===
The following games include American teams competing against FBS Independents, which only includes UConn for 2025.

Date	Visitor	Home	Site	Score
October 25	UConn	Rice	Rice Stadium • Houston, TX	W 37–34
November 1	UAB	UConn	Rentschler Field • East Hartford, CT	L 19–38
November 22	UConn	Florida Atlantic	Flagler Credit Union Stadium • Boca Raton, FL	L 45–48

=== American vs. FCS matchups ===
The following games include American teams competing against FCS schools.

Date	Visitor	Home	Site	Score
August 28	Alabama State	UAB	Protective Stadium • Birmingham, AL	W 52–42
August 29	Tarleton State	Army	Michie Stadium • West Point, NY	L 27–30
August 30	Chattanooga	Memphis	Simmons Bank Liberty Stadium • Memphis, TN	W 45–10
August 30	VMI	Navy	Navy–Marine Corps Memorial Stadium • Annapolis, MD	W 52–7
August 30	Lamar	North Texas	DATCU Stadium • Denton, TX	W 51–0
August 30	Abilene Christian	Tulsa	Skelly Field at H. A. Chapman Stadium • Tulsa, OK	W 35–7
September 6	Campbell	East Carolina	Dowdy–Ficklen Stadium • Greenville, NC	W 56–3
September 6	Florida A&M	Florida Atlantic	Flagler Credit Union Stadium • Boca Raton, FL	W 56–14
September 6	Howard	Temple	Lincoln Financial Field • Philadelphia, PA	W 55–7
September 13	Monmouth	Charlotte	Jerry Richardson Stadium • Charlotte, NC	W 42–35
September 13	Prairie View A&M	Rice	Rice Stadium • Houston, TX	W 38–17
September 13	Incarnate Word	UTSA	Alamodome • San Antonio, TX	W 48–20
September 20	South Carolina State	South Florida	Raymond James Stadium • Tampa, FL	W 63–14

== Awards and honors ==
=== Player of the week honors ===
Week	Offensive			Defensive			Special Teams		
Week	Player	Team	Position	Player	Team	Position	Player	Team	Position
Week 1	Evan Simon	Temple	QB	Jhalyn Shuler	South Florida	LB	Patrick Durkin	Tulane	K
Week 2	Byrum Brown	South Florida	QB	Collin Matteson	Army	S	Nico Gramatica	South Florida	K
Week 3	Jake Retzlaff	Tulane	QB	Shane Whitter	North Texas	LB	Solomon Beebe	UAB	RB/KR
Week 4	Caleb Hawkins	North Texas	RB	Chris Bracy	Memphis	DB	Seth Morgan	Tulsa	K
Week 5	Greg Desrosiers Jr.	Memphis	RB	Santana Hopper	Tulane	DL	Alec Clark	Tulane	P
Week 6	Blake Horvath	Navy	QB	Kamari Wilson	Memphis	DB	Gianni Spetic	Memphis	K
Week 7	Blake Horvath (2)	Navy	QB	Jhalyn Shuler (2)	South Florida	LB	Patrick Durkin (2)	Tulane	K
Week 8	Iverson Hooks	UAB	WR	Mac Harris	South Florida	LB	Nick Mazzie	East Carolina	K
Week 9	Drew Mestemaker	North Texas	QB	Coleman Cauley	Navy	LB	Dane Atton	Temple	P
Week 10	Owen McCown	UTSA	QB	Quinton Hammonds	North Texas	S	Dawson Jones	Army	K
Week 11	Jake Retzlaff (2)	Tulane	QB	Jarvis Lee	South Florida	CB	Nick Mazzie (2)	East Carolina	K
Week 12	Caleb Hawkins (2)	North Texas	RB	Phillip Hamilton	Navy	S	Nathan Kirkwood	Navy	K
Week 13	Wyatt Young	North Texas	WR	Shad Banks Jr.	UTSA	LB	Patrick Durkin (3)	Tulane	K
Week 14	Caleb Hawkins (3)	North Texas	RB	Jaydan Mayes	Army	CB	Kali Nguma	North Texas	K

=== American Athletic Individual Awards ===
The following individuals received postseason honors as chosen by the league's head coaches.

Award	Player	School
Offensive Player of the Year	Drew Mestemaker	North Texas
Defensive Player of the Year	Landon Robinson	Navy
Special Teams Player of the Year	Patrick Durkin	Tulane
Rookie of the Year	Caleb Hawkins	North Texas
Coach of the Year	Eric Morris	North Texas

=== All-Conference Teams ===
The following players were selected part of the All-Conference teams.

Position	Player	Team
First Team Offense
WR	Anthony Smith	East Carolina
WR	Cortez Braham	Memphis
WR	Wyatt Young	North Texas
OT	Jimarion McCrimon	East Carolina
OT	Travis Burke	Memphis
OG	Gabe Blair	North Texas
OG	Shadre Hurst	Tulane
C	Brady Small	Army
TE	Brody Foley	Tulsa
QB	Drew Mestemaker	North Texas
RB	Caleb Hawkins	North Texas
RB	Robert Henry Jr.	UTSA
First Team Defense
DL	Zion Wilson	East Carolina
DL	William Whitlow Jr.	Memphis
DL	Landon Robinson	Navy
DL	Santana Hopper	Tulane
LB	Sam Brumfield	Memphis
LB	Mac Harris	South Florida
LB	Shad Banks Jr.	UTSA
LB	Ray Coney	Tulsa
CB	DeShawn Rucker	South Florida
CB	Elijah Green	Tulsa
S	Jack Tchienchou	Tulane
S	Ja’Marley Riddle	East Carolina
First Team Special Teams
K	Patrick Durkin	Tulane
P	Alec Clark	Tulane
RS	Sutton Smith	Memphis
DS	Jackson Lee	Florida Atlantic
DS	Rayne Fry	Navy

Position	Player	Team
Second Team Offense
WR	Iverson Hooks	UAB
WR	Easton Messer	Florida Atlantic
WR	Eli Heidenreich	Navy
OT	Braydon Nelson	North Texas
OT	Connor McLaughlin	South Florida
OG	Emmanuel Poku	East Carolina
OG	Ben Purvis	Navy
C	Tay Yanta	North Texas
TE	Peter Clarke	Temple
QB	Byrum Brown	South Florida
RB	Alex Tecza	Navy
RB	Dominic Richardson	Tulsa
Second Team Defense
DL	JD Lampley	East Carolina
DL	Cam'Ron Stewart	Temple
DL	Tre'von Mcalpine	Tulane
DL	J'Dan Burnett	Tulsa
LB	Andon Thomas	Army
LB	Ethan Wesloski	North Texas
LB	Jhalyn Shuler	South Florida
LB	Sam Howard	Tulane
CB	Omarion Cooper	Memphis
CB	David Fisher	North Texas
S	Fred Gaskin	South Florida
S	Lento Smith Jr.	Tulsa
Second Team Special Teams
K	Nico Gramatica	South Florida
P	Caile Hogan	UTSA
RS	JoJo Bermudez	Temple
DS	Triston O'Brien	East Carolina

Position	Player	Team
Third Team Offense
WR	Javen Nicholas	Charlotte
WR	Yannick Smith	East Carolina
WR	Devin McCuin	UTSA
OT	Jimto Obidegwu	North Texas
OT	Derrick Graham	Tulane
OG	Johnny Dickson	North Texas
OG	Zane Herring	South Florida
C	Cole Best	South Florida
TE	Houston Thomas	UTSA
QB	Blake Horvath	Navy
RB	Sutton Smith	Memphis
RB	Quinton Jackson	Rice
Third Team Defense
DL	Jack Bousum	Army
DL	CJ Doggette Jr.	Florida Atlantic
DL	Pooda Walker	Memphis
DL	Tony Anyanwu	Rice
DL	Josh Celiscar	South Florida
LB	Dameon Wilson	East Carolina
LB	Leon Hart Jr.	Florida Atlantic
LB	MarcAnthony Parker	Navy
LB	Trey Fields	North Texas
LB	Andrew Awe	Rice
LB	Harvey Dyson	Tulane
CB	Ben Osueke	Temple
CB	Javion White	Tulane
S	Will Jones	North Texas
S	Jimmy Wyrick	UTSA
Third Team Special Teams
K	Gianni Spetic	Memphis
P	Alex Bacchetta	Rice
RS	Solomon Beebe	UAB
RS	TJ Smith	Tulane
DS	Jason Arredondo	Tulane

=== All-Americans ===
Position	Player	School	Selector
First Team All-Americans
DL	Landon Robinson	Navy	(AP, FWAA, SI, USAT)

Position	Player	School	Selector
Second Team All-Americans
RB	Caleb Hawkins	Tulane	(WCFF)
OL	Shadre Hurst	Tulane	(TSN)
OL	Will Jeffcoat	Army	(FWAA)
DL	Landon Robinson	Navy	(TSN, WCFF, ESPN)
DL	Santana Hopper	Tulane	(Athletic)
AP / RS	Caleb Hawkins	North Texas	(TSN)

== NFL draft ==
The NFL draft will be held in Pittsburgh, Pennsylvania. The following list includes all American players selected in the draft.

=== List of selections ===
Player	Position	School	Draft Round	Round Pick	Overall Pick	Team
Travis Burke	OT	Memphis	4	17	117	Los Angeles Chargers
Anthony Smith	WR	East Carolina	7	2	218	Dallas Cowboys
Landon Robinson	DT	Navy	7	10	226	Cincinnati Bengals
Eli Heidenreich	RB	Navy	7	14	230	Pittsburgh Steelers
