= 1999–2000 Detroit Pistons season =

NBA team season

- Head coach: Alvin Gentry (fired); George Irvine (interim)
- General manager: Rick Sund
- Owner: Bill Davidson
- Arena: The Palace of Auburn Hills

Results
- Record: 42–40 (.512)
- Place: Division: 4th (Central); Conference: 7th (Eastern)
- Playoff finish: First round (lost to Heat 0–3)
- Stats at Basketball Reference

The 1999–2000 Detroit Pistons season was the 52nd season for the Detroit Pistons in the National Basketball Association, and their 43rd season in Detroit, Michigan.

== Season summary ==
=== Off-season ===
During the off-season, the team re-signed free agents, and former Pistons players Terry Mills, and Michael Curry; the team also signed John Crotty.

For the season, the Pistons revealed new burgundy alternate road uniforms, which featured a black trim and black side panels on their jerseys and shorts, along with teal and golden yellow outlines; these uniforms would remain in use until 2001.

=== Regular season ===
With the return of Mills and Curry, and after the retirements of All-Star guard Joe Dumars and Bison Dele, the Pistons struggled losing their first four games of the regular season. However, the team won 18 of their next 28 games, which included a six-game winning streak between December and January, but soon posted a six-game losing streak in January, and later on held a 25–23 record at the All-Star break. At mid-season, Don Reid was released to free agency, and later on signed with the Washington Wizards, while head coach Alvin Gentry was fired after a 28–30 start, and was replaced with assistant coach George Irvine as an interim coach. Under Irvine, the Pistons won 14 of their final 24 games of the season, and finished in fourth place in the Central Division with a 42–40 record, earning the seventh seed in the Eastern Conference.

Grant Hill averaged 25.8 points, 6.6 rebounds, 5.2 assists and 1.4 steals per game, and was named to the All-NBA Second Team, while Jerry Stackhouse averaged 23.6 points, 4.5 assists and 1.3 steals per game, and Lindsey Hunter provided the team with 12.7 points, 4.0 assists and 1.6 steals per game, and also led them with 168 three-point field goals. In addition, Christian Laettner provided with 12.2 points and 6.7 rebounds per game, while Jerome Williams played a sixth man role off the bench, averaging 8.4 points and 9.6 rebounds per game, and Mills contributed 6.7 points and 4.8 rebounds per game. Off the bench, second-year center Mikki Moore averaged 7.9 points and 3.9 rebounds per game, but only played just 29 games, while Curry provided with 6.2 points per game, and Crotty contributed 4.7 points per game.

During the NBA All-Star weekend at The Arena in Oakland in Oakland, California, Hill and Stackhouse were both selected for the 2000 NBA All-Star Game, as members of the Eastern Conference All-Star team; it was Stackhouse's first ever All-Star appearance. In addition, Hill also participated in the NBA 2Ball Competition, along with Jennifer Azzi of the WNBA's Detroit Shock, while Stackhouse participated in the NBA Slam Dunk Contest for the second time. Hill also finished in eighth place in Most Valuable Player voting, while Stackhouse finished in third place in Most Improved Player voting, and Williams finished in fifth place in Sixth Man of the Year voting.

The Pistons finished 16th in the NBA in home-game attendance, with an attendance of 678,470 at The Palace of Auburn Hills during the regular season.

=== NBA playoffs ===
In the Eastern Conference First Round of the 2000 NBA playoffs, the Pistons faced off against the 2nd–seeded, and Atlantic Division champion Miami Heat, who were led by All-Star center, and Defensive Player of the Year, Alonzo Mourning, Jamal Mashburn and P.J. Brown. The Heat were without Tim Hardaway, who was out due to a knee injury. However, prior to the playoffs, Hill suffered a devastating ankle injury during the final month of the regular season, and then re-injured his ankle during Game 2, in which the Pistons lost to the Heat on the road, 84–82 at the American Airlines Arena. Without Hill, the Pistons lost Game 3 to the Heat at home, 91–72 at The Palace of Auburn Hills, thus losing the series in a three-game sweep.

=== Aftermath ===
Following the season, Hill was traded to the Orlando Magic after six seasons with the Pistons, while Hunter was traded to the Milwaukee Bucks. Meanwhile, Laettner and Mills were both dealt to the Dallas Mavericks, while Loy Vaught was traded to the Mavericks in a separate trade, and Crotty re-signed with his former team, the Utah Jazz. However, Mills was released by the Mavericks, and signed as a free agent with the Indiana Pacers.

== Draft picks ==
Round	Pick	Player	Position	Nationality	College
2	54	Melvin Levett	SG	United States	Cincinnati

== Roster ==
1999–2000 Detroit Pistons roster
Players

Pos.	No.	Player	Height	Weight	DOB	From
G/F	30	Jud Buechler	6 ft 6 in (1.98 m)	220 lb (100 kg)	1968–06–19	Arizona
G	22	John Crotty	6 ft 1 in (1.85 m)	185 lb (84 kg)	1969–07–15	Virginia
G	12	Michael Curry	6 ft 5 in (1.96 m)	210 lb (95 kg)	1968–08–22	Georgia Southern
F	33	Grant Hill	6 ft 8 in (2.03 m)	225 lb (102 kg)	1972–10–05	Duke
G	1	Lindsey Hunter	6 ft 2 in (1.88 m)	195 lb (88 kg)	1970–12–03	Jackson State
G	5	Jermaine Jackson	6 ft 4 in (1.93 m)	204 lb (93 kg)	1976–06–07	Detroit Mercy
C	32	Christian Laettner	6 ft 11 in (2.11 m)	235 lb (107 kg)	1969–08–17	Duke
F/C	6	Terry Mills	6 ft 10 in (2.08 m)	230 lb (104 kg)	1967–12–21	Michigan
C	00	Eric Montross	7 ft 0 in (2.13 m)	270 lb (122 kg)	1971–09–23	North Carolina
F/C	31	Mikki Moore	6 ft 11 in (2.11 m)	225 lb (102 kg)	1975–11–04	Nebraska
G/F	42	Jerry Stackhouse	6 ft 6 in (1.98 m)	218 lb (99 kg)	1974–11–05	North Carolina
F/C	35	Loy Vaught	6 ft 9 in (2.06 m)	230 lb (104 kg)	1968–02–27	Michigan
F	13	Jerome Williams	6 ft 9 in (2.06 m)	206 lb (93 kg)	1973–05–10	Georgetown

Coaches
Head coach
- Alvin Gentry (fired)
- George Irvine
Assistant(s)
- Larry Drew
- Morris McHone
- Mike Abdenour (trainer)

Legend
- (DP) Unsigned draft pick
- (FA) Free agent
- (S) Suspended
- Injured

Roster
Updated: November 13, 1999

== Regular season ==
=== Season standings ===
Central Division	W	L	PCT	GB	Home	Road	Div
y-Indiana Pacers	56	26	.683	–	36–5	20–21	20–8
x-Charlotte Hornets	49	33	.598	7	30–11	19–22	20–8
x-Toronto Raptors	45	37	.549	11	26–15	19–22	16–12
x-Detroit Pistons	42	40	.512	14	27–14	15–26	16–12
x-Milwaukee Bucks	42	40	.512	14	23–18	19–22	16–12
Cleveland Cavaliers	32	50	.390	24	22–19	10–31	8–20
Atlanta Hawks	28	54	.341	28	21–20	7–34	11–17
Chicago Bulls	17	65	.207	39	12–29	5–36	5–23

#	Eastern Conference				
#	Team	W	L	PCT	GB
1	c-Indiana Pacers	56	26	.683	–
2	y-Miami Heat	52	30	.634	4
3	x-New York Knicks	50	32	.610	6
4	x-Charlotte Hornets	49	33	.598	7
5	x-Philadelphia 76ers	49	33	.598	7
6	x-Toronto Raptors	45	37	.549	11
7	x-Detroit Pistons	42	40	.512	14
8	x-Milwaukee Bucks	42	40	.512	14
9	Orlando Magic	41	41	.500	15
10	Boston Celtics	35	47	.427	21
11	Cleveland Cavaliers	32	50	.390	24
12	New Jersey Nets	31	51	.378	25
13	Washington Wizards	29	53	.354	27
14	Atlanta Hawks	28	54	.341	28
15	Chicago Bulls	17	65	.207	39

z - clinched division title
y - clinched division title
x - clinched playoff spot

=== Game log ===
1999–2000 game log
Total: 42-40 (Home: 27–14; Road: 15–26)
November: 7–8 (home: 5–3; road: 2–5)

Game	Date	Team	Score	High points	High rebounds	High assists	Location Attendance	Record
1	November 2	@ Miami	L 122–128 (2OT)	Grant Hill (41)	Laettner & Williams (11)	Grant Hill (5)	Miami Arena; 14,623	0–1
2	November 3	@ Orlando	L 94–103	Grant Hill (30)	Jerome Williams (12)	Grant Hill (7)	TD Waterhouse Centre; 14,253	0–2
3	November 5	New York	L 91–103	Jerry Stackhouse (30)	Jerome Williams (12)	Grant Hill (6)	The Palace Of Auburn Hills; 22,076	0–3
4	November 6	@ Milwaukee	L 111–121	Jerry Stackhouse (20)	Grant Hill (8)	Hill & Hunter (7)	Bradley Center; 18,374	0–4
5	November 10	@ Boston	W 110–92	Jerry Stackhouse (30)	Jerome Williams (16)	Lindsey Hunter (9)	FleetCenter; 15,638	1–4
6	November 11	Toronto	L 106–123	Grant Hill (25)	Jerome Williams (10)	Jerry Stackhouse (7)	The Palace Of Auburn Hills; 13,157	1–5
7	November 13	Seattle	W 107–99	Grant Hill (34)	Williams & Mills (11)	Jerry Stackhouse (8)	The Palace Of Auburn Hills; 14,266	2–5
8	November 16	@ Toronto	L 85–89	Stackhouse & Williams (26)	Jerome Williams (10)	Grant Hill (10)	Air Canada Centre; 14,273	2–6
9	November 17	New Jersey	W 109–107	Grant Hill (32)	Jerome Williams (14)	Christian Laettner (6)	The Palace Of Auburn Hills; 12,683	3–6
10	November 19	Cleveland	W 101–90	Grant Hill (28)	Hill & Williams (10)	Lindsey Hunter (7)	The Palace Of Auburn Hills; 15,377	4–6
11	November 21	Milwaukee	W 113–94	Grant Hill (31)	Laettner & Williams (12)	Grant Hill (7)	The Palace Of Auburn Hills; 13,163	5–6
12	November 25	@ Indiana	W 107–99	Jerry Stackhouse (26)	Stackhouse & Williams (9)	Jerry Stackhouse (6)	Conseco Fieldhouse; 18,345	6–6
13	November 26	Atlanta	W 93–91	Grant Hill (30)	Jerome Williams (13)	Hill & Stackhouse (4)	The Palace Of Auburn Hills; 17,891	7–6
14	November 28	Orlando	L 99–108	Grant Hill (24)	Jerome Williams (13)	Jerry Stackhouse (10)	The Palace Of Auburn Hills; 13,212	7–7
15	November 30	@ San Antonio	L 87–106	Grant Hill (30)	Don Reid (7)	Hunter & Crotty (5)	Alamodome; 18,328	7–8

December: 8–6 (home: 5–1; road: 3–5)

Game	Date	Team	Score	High points	High rebounds	High assists	Location Attendance	Record
16	December 1	@ Denver	L 96–100	Grant Hill (39)	Grant Hill (7)	Jerry Stackhouse (4)	Pepsi Center; 11,881	7–9
17	December 3	San Antonio	W 102–80	Grant Hill (28)	Terry Mills (10)	Grant Hill (6)	The Palace Of Auburn Hills; 18,338	8–9
18	December 4	@ Atlanta	L 110–112	Grant Hill (33)	Grant Hill (10)	Grant Hill (6)	Philips Arena; 17,328	8–10
19	December 7	@ Milwaukee	W 116–112	Grant Hill (31)	Jerome Williams (10)	Grant Hill (12)	Bradley Center; 12,847	9–10
20	December 10	L.A. Clippers	W 107–83	Grant Hill (27)	Hill & Williams (12)	Lindsey Hunter (8)	The Palace Of Auburn Hills; 15,249	10–10
21	December 12	@ L.A. Lakers	L 93–101	Grant Hill (25)	Grant Hill (12)	Grant Hill (7)	STAPLES Center; 18,875	10–11
22	December 14	@ Phoenix	L 104–114	Jerry Stackhouse (35)	Jerome Williams (10)	Jerry Stackhouse (7)	America West Arena; 18,575	10–12
23	December 16	@ Golden State	W 116–108	Grant Hill (25)	Hill & Williams (8)	Jerry Stackhouse (11)	The Arena in Oakland; 10,249	11–12
24	December 18	Philadelphia	W 104–91	Jerry Stackhouse (26)	Jerome Williams (16)	Grant Hill (7)	The Palace Of Auburn Hills; 16,792	12–12
25	December 20	@ Philadelphia	L 121–122 (OT)	Grant Hill (32)	Terry Mills (8)	Hill & Stackhouse (6)	First Union Center; 16,520	12–13
26	December 21	Washington	L 83–97	Grant Hill (25)	Jerome Williams (11)	Terry Mills (4)	The Palace Of Auburn Hills; 14,181	12–14
27	December 26	Charlotte	W 114–96	Grant Hill (30)	Jerome Williams (21)	Lindsey Hunter (7)	The Palace Of Auburn Hills; 15,339	13–14
28	December 29	@ Chicago	W 91–77	Jerry Stackhouse (23)	Jerome Williams (12)	Grant Hill (5)	United Center; 22,363	14–14
29	December 30	Atlanta	W 106–105 (OT)	Jerry Stackhouse (33)	3 players tied (9)	Grant Hill (12)	The Palace Of Auburn Hills; 18,891	15–14

January: 7–8 (home: 4–2; road: 3–6)

Game	Date	Team	Score	High points	High rebounds	High assists	Location Attendance	Record
30	January 3	@ Orlando	W 118–106	Grant Hill (42)	Christian Laettner (14)	Grant Hill (8)	TD Waterhouse Centre; 12,568	16–14
31	January 5	@ Atlanta	W 120–108	Grant Hill (42)	Christian Laettner (12)	Jerry Stackhouse (7)	Philips Arena; 15,849	17–14
32	January 6	Milwaukee	W 101–95	Grant Hill (31)	Jerome Williams (17)	Hill & Hunter (7)	The Palace Of Auburn Hills; 14,233	18–14
33	January 8	Minnesota	L 105–110	Grant Hill (40)	Jerome Williams (12)	Grant Hill (9)	The Palace Of Auburn Hills; 20,529	18–15
34	January 12	New York	W 114–108	3 players tied (29)	Christian Laettner (9)	Grant Hill (7)	The Palace Of Auburn Hills; 16,619	19–15
35	January 14	Washington	W 105–98	Jerry Stackhouse (32)	Jerome Williams (13)	Lindsey Hunter (6)	The Palace Of Auburn Hills; 16,008	20–15
36	January 15	@ Washington	W 112–107	Grant Hill (39)	Jerome Williams (14)	Hill & Hunter (5)	MCI Center; 17,072	21–15
37	January 17	@ New York	L 94–105	Christian Laettner (23)	Jerome Williams (12)	Jerry Stackhouse (9)	Madison Square Garden; 19,763	21–16
38	January 20	@ New Jersey	L 120–122	Laettner & Stackhouse (28)	Christian Laettner (8)	Jerry Stackhouse (9)	Continental Airlines Arena; 15,222	21–17
39	January 22	@ Chicago	L 92–98	Terry Mills (20)	Terry Mills (9)	Jerry Stackhouse (6)	United Center; 22,191	21–18
40	January 23	Dallas	L 91–99	Jerry Stackhouse (36)	Jerome Williams (10)	Lindsey Hunter (7)	The Palace Of Auburn Hills; 13,047	21–19
41	January 25	@ Cleveland	L 107–116 (OT)	Jerry Stackhouse (38)	Terry Mills (12)	Jerry Stackhouse (7)	Gund Arena; 10,930	21–20
42	January 27	@ Charlotte	L 102–117	Jerry Stackhouse (34)	Jerome Williams (7)	Jerry Stackhouse (6)	Charlotte Coliseum; 16,238	21–21
43	January 29	Philadelphia	W 90–88	Jerry Stackhouse (26)	Christian Laettner (16)	Jerry Stackhouse (5)	The Palace Of Auburn Hills; 20,158	22–21
44	January 31	@ Miami	L 82–104	Jerry Stackhouse (17)	Jerome Williams (9)	Jerry Stackhouse (5)	American Airlines Arena; 19,128	22–22

February: 6–6 (home: 6–2; road: 0–4)

Game	Date	Team	Score	High points	High rebounds	High assists	Location Attendance	Record
45	February 2	Sacramento	L 110–113	Jerry Stackhouse (35)	Jerome Williams (16)	Jerry Stackhouse (5)	The Palace Of Auburn Hills; 20,259	22–23
46	February 4	Cleveland	W 105–96	Lindsey Hunter (26)	Christian Laettner (10)	Lindsey Hunter (10)	The Palace Of Auburn Hills; 16,903	23–23
47	February 6	Houston	W 109–105	Grant Hill (36)	Jerome Williams (9)	Jerry Stackhouse (7)	The Palace Of Auburn Hills; 15,388	24–23
48	February 9	Toronto	W 115–108 (OT)	Grant Hill (30)	Grant Hill (13)	Hill & Crotty (4)	The Palace Of Auburn Hills; 17,710	25–23
All-Star Break
49	February 15	@ Houston	L 102–107	Jerry Stackhouse (29)	Grant Hill (11)	Grant Hill (6)	Compaq Center; 14,453	25–24
50	February 17	@ Dallas	L 97–106	Jerry Stackhouse (22)	Jerome Williams (17)	Grant Hill (6)	Reunion Arena; 16,241	25–25
51	February 19	@ Utah	L 87–91	Lindsey Hunter (24)	Grant Hill (9)	Grant Hill (8)	Delta Center; 19,911	25–26
52	February 21	Miami	W 95–87	Grant Hill (26)	3 players tied (9)	Jerry Stackhouse (9)	The Palace Of Auburn Hills; 15,413	26–26
53	February 23	Indiana	L 111–118	Grant Hill (24)	Terry Mills (7)	Grant Hill (6)	The Palace Of Auburn Hills; 16,371	26–27
54	February 25	Golden State	W 131–99	Grant Hill (30)	Jerome Williams (12)	Jerry Stackhouse (7)	The Palace Of Auburn Hills; 17,599	27–27
55	February 27	Chicago	W 93–90	Jerry Stackhouse (27)	Jerome Williams (14)	Jerry Stackhouse (5)	The Palace Of Auburn Hills; 13,751	28–27
56	February 29	@ Indiana	L 105–115	Grant Hill (37)	Christian Laettner (12)	Hill & Stackhouse (5)	Conseco Fieldhouse; 18,345	28–28

March: 8–7 (home: 4–5; road: 4–2)

Game	Date	Team	Score	High points	High rebounds	High assists	Location Attendance	Record
57	March 1	Utah	L 94–107	Grant Hill (26)	Jerome Williams (11)	4 players tied (3)	The Palace Of Auburn Hills; 15,712	28–29
58	March 4	@ Washington	L 94–100	Jerry Stackhouse (26)	Christian Laettner (9)	Grant Hill (6)	MCI Center; 17,418	28–30
59	March 8	Denver	W 130–116	Jerry Stackhouse (40)	Moore & Williams (8)	Grant Hill (10)	The Palace Of Auburn Hills; 12,683	29–30
60	March 10	Vancouver	W 111–97	Stackhouse & Hill (27)	Jerome Williams (12)	Grant Hill (6)	The Palace Of Auburn Hills; 22,076	30–30
61	March 11	Portland	L 94–99	Grant Hill (30)	Christian Laettner (8)	3 players tied (4)	The Palace Of Auburn Hills; 22,076	30–31
62	March 13	Boston	W 124–115	Jerry Stackhouse (36)	Christian Laettner (10)	Lindsey Hunter (8)	The Palace Of Auburn Hills; 12,340	31–31
63	March 15	Orlando	W 113–91	Jerry Stackhouse (32)	Christian Laettner (17)	Jerry Stackhouse (6)	The Palace Of Auburn Hills; 13,462	32–31
64	March 17	L.A. Lakers	L 82–110	Jerry Stackhouse (18)	Jerome Williams (13)	Lindsey Hunter (5)	The Palace Of Auburn Hills; 22,076	32–32
65	March 19	@ Vancouver	W 101–99	Grant Hill (31)	Jerome Williams (11)	Christian Laettner (5)	General Motors Place; 15,240	33–32
66	March 21	@ Seattle	W 100–90	Grant Hill (33)	Jerome Williams (14)	Grant Hill (8)	KeyArena at Seattle Center; 15,730	34–32
67	March 22	@ Portland	W 104–95	Grant Hill (24)	Jerome Williams (13)	Grant Hill (6)	Rose Garden Arena; 20,452	35–32
68	March 24	@ Sacramento	L 103–113	Grant Hill (35)	Grant Hill (9)	Hill & Hunter (5)	ARCO Arena; 17,317	35–33
69	March 25	@ L.A. Clippers	W 126–107	Jerry Stackhouse (31)	Jerome Williams (11)	Jerry Stackhouse (7)	STAPLES Center; 17,840	36–33
70	March 29	Charlotte	L 91–98	Grant Hill (26)	Jerome Williams (11)	Jerry Stackhouse (6)	The Palace Of Auburn Hills; 14,997	36–34
71	March 31	Phoenix	L 97–98	Grant Hill (28)	Jerome Williams (12)	Hill & Stackhouse (4)	The Palace Of Auburn Hills; 22,076	36–35

April: 6–5 (home: 3–1; road: 3–4)

Game	Date	Team	Score	High points	High rebounds	High assists	Location Attendance	Record
72	April 2	@ New Jersey	W 113–92	Jerry Stackhouse (34)	Grant Hill (12)	Grant Hill (8)	Continental Airlines Arena; 17,097	37–35
73	April 4	@ Toronto	W 104–88	Grant Hill (32)	Grant Hill (9)	Jerry Stackhouse (3)	Air Canada Centre; 19,800	38–35
74	April 5	Boston	W 111–106	Grant Hill (27)	Grant Hill (9)	Hill & Stackhouse (3)	The Palace Of Auburn Hills; 14,581	39–35
75	April 7	@ Charlotte	W 97–82	Jerry Stackhouse (23)	Jerome Williams (11)	Jerry Stackhouse (7)	Charlotte Coliseum; 20,002	40–35
76	April 8	@ Cleveland	L 98–117	Jerome Williams (19)	Jerome Williams (11)	Grant Hill (5)	Gund Arena; 20,562	40–36
77	April 10	@ Minnesota	L 100–102	Grant Hill (36)	Christian Laettner (10)	Christian Laettner (5)	Target Center; 15,374	40–37
78	April 12	Miami	W 90–73	Jerry Stackhouse (29)	Jerome Williams (15)	Williams & Stackhouse (3)	The Palace Of Auburn Hills; 17,388	41–37
79	April 15	@ Philadelphia	L 94–100	Jerry Stackhouse (15)	Jerome Williams (12)	Lindsey Hunter (7)	First Union Center; 20,748	41–38
80	April 16	Indiana	L 101–112	Jerry Stackhouse (26)	3 players tied (6)	Lindsey Hunter (6)	The Palace Of Auburn Hills; 17,629	41–39
81	April 18	@ New York	L 88–100	Jerry Stackhouse (24)	3 players tied (6)	John Crotty (5)	Madison Square Garden; 19,763	41–40
82	April 19	Chicago	W 112–91	Jerry Stackhouse (21)	Jerome Williams (8)	Crotty & Stackhouse (7)	The Palace Of Auburn Hills; 16,771	42–40

1999–00 schedule

== Playoffs ==
2000 playoff game log
First Round: 0–3 (home: 0–1; road: 0–2)

Game	Date	Team	Score	High points	High rebounds	High assists	Location Attendance	Series
1	April 22	@ Miami	L 85–95	Jerry Stackhouse (23)	Hill, Williams (9)	Grant Hill (5)	American Airlines Arena; 16,500	0–1
2	April 25	@ Miami	L 82–84	Jerry Stackhouse (26)	Stackhouse, Williams (7)	Grant Hill (4)	American Airlines Arena; 16,500	0–2
3	April 29	Miami	L 72–91	Jerry Stackhouse (25)	Christian Laettner (7)	Jerry Stackhouse (3)	The Palace of Auburn Hills; 14,507	0–3

2000 schedule

== Player statistics ==
Legend
GP	Games played	GS	Games started	MPG	Minutes per game
FG%	Field-goal percentage	3P%	3-point field-goal percentage	FT%	Free-throw percentage
RPG	Rebounds per game	APG	Assists per game	SPG	Steals per game
BPG	Blocks per game	PPG	Points per game

=== Season ===
Player	GP	GS	MPG	FG%	3P%	FT%	RPG	APG	SPG	BPG	PPG
Marcus Brown	6	0	7.5	.286	.000	1.000	1.2	.5	.0	.0	1.7
Jud Buechler	58	5	11.3	.353	.217	.286	1.6	.6	.4	.3	2.2
John Crotty	69	0	13.6	.422	.413	.860	1.1	1.9	.4	.1	4.7
Michael Curry	82	3	19.6	.480	.200	.839	1.3	1.1	.4	.1	6.2
Grant Hill	74	74	37.5	.489	.347	.795	6.6	5.2	1.4	.6	25.8
Lindsey Hunter	82	82	35.6	.425	.432	.760	3.0	4.0	1.6	.3	12.7
Jermaine Jackson	7	0	10.4	.091	.000	.625	1.6	.6	.4	.0	1.0
Christian Laettner	82	82	29.8	.473	.292	.812	6.7	2.3	1.0	.5	12.2
Terry Mills	82	78	22.5	.439	.393	.735	4.8	1.0	.5	.3	6.7
Eric Montross	51	0	6.5	.309		.500	1.4	.1	.1	.2	.8
Mikki Moore	29	0	16.8	.621		.794	3.9	.6	.3	1.1	7.9
Don Reid^{†}	21	3	7.9	.471		.500	1.2	.0	.2	.6	1.7
Jerry Stackhouse	82	82	38.4	.428	.288	.815	3.8	4.5	1.3	.4	23.6
Loy Vaught	43	0	6.8	.360	.000	.688	2.1	.3	.1	.1	1.7
Jerome Williams	82	1	25.6	.564	.000	.616	9.6	.8	1.2	.3	8.4

=== Playoffs ===
Player	GP	GS	MPG	FG%	3P%	FT%	RPG	APG	SPG	BPG	PPG
Jud Buechler	3	0	11.3	.286	.400		1.3	.3	.0	.3	2.0
John Crotty	3	0	17.0	.200	.000	1.000	1.3	1.3	.3	.3	2.0
Michael Curry	3	1	26.3	.522		.667	1.0	1.0	.3	.3	9.3
Grant Hill	2	2	27.5	.375	.500	.900	5.5	4.5	.5	.0	11.0
Lindsey Hunter	3	3	31.0	.313	.111	.667	2.3	1.7	1.7	.3	8.3
Christian Laettner	3	3	25.0	.412		.750	5.0	2.0	.0	.3	6.7
Terry Mills	3	3	25.7	.600	.667	.500	2.0	.3	.7	.0	8.3
Eric Montross	2	0	2.5				1.0	.0	.0	.0	.0
Mikki Moore	3	0	14.0	.417		1.000	4.0	1.0	.3	.0	6.0
Jerry Stackhouse	3	3	40.0	.407	.429	.742	4.0	3.3	.7	.0	24.7
Loy Vaught	2	0	8.0	.000			3.0	.0	1.0	.0	.0
Jerome Williams	3	0	24.3	.500		.125	7.0	.7	1.0	.0	5.0

Player statistics citation:

== Awards and records ==
- Grant Hill, All-NBA Second Team
