= Santana Hopper =

American football player (born 2004)

No. 97 – Colorado Buffaloes
- Position: Defensive tackle
- Class: Senior

Personal information
- Born: June 20, 2004 (age 22)
- Listed height: 6 ft 2 in (1.88 m)
- Listed weight: 265 lb (120 kg)

Career information
- High school: Shelby (Shelby, North Carolina)
- College: Appalachian State (2022–2024); Tulane (2025); Colorado (2026–present)

Awards and highlights
- First-team All-Sun Belt (2024); First-team All-AAC (2025)
- Stats at ESPN

Santana Hopper (born June 20, 2004) is an American college football defensive tackle for the Colorado Buffaloes. He previously played for the Appalachian State Mountaineers and Tulane Green Wave.

== Early life ==
Hopper attended Shelby High School in Shelby, North Carolina. During his high school career he had 176 tackles and 24.5 sacks. He committed to Appalachian State University to play college football.

== College career ==
Hopper played at Appalachian State from 2022 to 2024, recording 36 tackles and 8.5 sacks over 26 games. After the 2024 season, he entered the transfer portal and committed to the University of Tulane. In his lone season with Tulane in 2025, he started 13 of 14 games and had 31 tackles and 4.5 sacks. After the season, Hopper entered the transfer portal again and committed to the University of Colorado Boulder. He entered his first season at Colorado in 2026 as a starter.
