= Jerome Williams (basketball) =

American basketball player (born 1973)

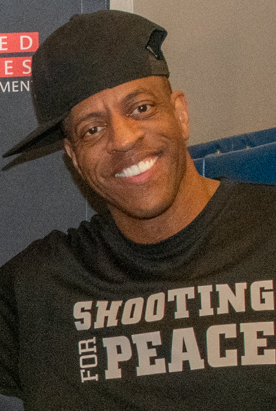
- Williams in 2023

Personal information
- Born: May 10, 1973 (age 53) Washington, D.C., U.S.
- Listed height: 6 ft 9 in (2.06 m)
- Listed weight: 206 lb (93 kg)

Career information
- High school: Col. Zadok Magruder (Rockville, Maryland)
- College: Montgomery College (1992–1994); Georgetown (1994–1996)
- NBA draft: 1996: 1st round, 26th overall pick
- Drafted by: Detroit Pistons
- Playing career: 1996–2005
- Position: Power forward
- Number: 13, 11, 31

Career history
- 1996–2001: Detroit Pistons
- 2001–2003: Toronto Raptors
- 2003–2004: Chicago Bulls
- 2004–2005: New York Knicks

Career NBA statistics
- Points: 3,865 (6.6 ppg)
- Rebounds: 3,743 (6.4 rpg)
- Steals: 618 (1.1 spg)
- Stats at NBA.com
- Stats at Basketball Reference

Jerome Williams (born May 10, 1973), nicknamed "Junkyard Dog" or "JYD", is an American former professional basketball player active in the National Basketball Association (NBA) between 1996 and 2005. Williams played for the Detroit Pistons, Toronto Raptors, Chicago Bulls, and the New York Knicks.

== Career ==
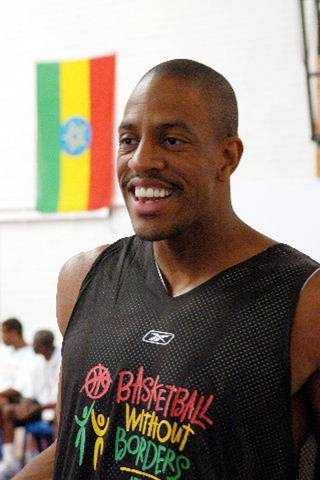
Williams in 2005

He was a star player on the Magruder High School basketball team. Drafted out of Georgetown University by the Detroit Pistons with the 26th pick of the 1996 NBA draft (the pick originally belonged to the San Antonio Spurs and went to the Pistons in the Dennis Rodman trade), he played four-plus years with the Pistons, becoming one of their key reserves. He was a fan favorite during his days playing for the Toronto Raptors due to his tenacious efforts on the court.

On February 22, 2001, Williams was traded from the Detroit Pistons, along with Eric Montross, to the Toronto Raptors in exchange for Corliss Williamson, Tyrone Corbin, Dávid Kornél and a future first-round draft pick. He was so enthusiastic about joining his new teammates that he immediately drove from Detroit to Toronto upon hearing the news. In 2002–03 with the Raptors, Williams averaged 9.7 points per game, primarily as a starter, his career-best scoring average. In 2003, Williams also made a cameo appearance in the Disney Channel movie Full-Court Miracle.

In December 2003 Williams was traded again, this time along with Antonio Davis and Chris Jefferies, to the Chicago Bulls for Jalen Rose, Donyell Marshall and Lonny Baxter. Overall in 2003–04, Williams played in 68 games, starting 44 of them, averaging 6.2 points and 7.0 rebounds per game. During the 2004 offseason, he was involved in yet another trade, one that sent him and Jamal Crawford to the New York Knicks for Dikembe Mutombo, Frank Williams, Othella Harrington and Cezary Trybanski. His relocation to New York meant a relegation to the bench, as he played about 17 minutes per game.

On August 15, 2005, the Knicks waived Williams to avoid luxury taxes on his salary, as part of the NBA's new labor agreement. He announced his retirement from his playing career less than 48 hours later. Williams played in 587 games over nine seasons, averaging 6.6 points and 6.4 rebounds per game.

== NBA career statistics ==
Legend
GP	Games played	GS	Games started	MPG	Minutes per game
FG%	Field goal percentage	3P%	3-point field goal percentage	FT%	Free throw percentage
RPG	Rebounds per game	APG	Assists per game	SPG	Steals per game
BPG	Blocks per game	PPG	Points per game	**Bold**	Career high
*	Led the league

=== Regular season ===
Year	Team	GP	GS	MPG	FG%	3P%	FT%	RPG	APG	SPG	BPG	PPG
1996–97	Detroit	33	0	5.3	.392	–	.529	1.5	.2	.4	.0	1.5
1997–98	Detroit	77	3	16.9	.524	.000	.651	4.9	.6	.7	.1	5.3
1998–99	Detroit	50*	10	23.1	.500	–	.673	7.0	.5	1.3	.1	7.1
1999–00	Detroit	**82**	1	25.6	**.564**	.000	.616	**9.6**	.8	1.2	.3	8.4
2000–01	Detroit	33	2	24.4	.438	.000	.722	8.4	1.0	1.2	.3	7.3
2000–01	Toronto	26	0	14.5	.516	.000	**.778**	4.0	.5	.7	**.4**	5.0
2001–02	Toronto	68	32	24.1	.490	–	.676	5.7	1.1	1.1	**.4**	7.6
2002–03	Toronto	71	**63**	**33.0**	.499	**.167**	.555	9.2	**1.3**	**1.6**	**.4**	**9.7**
2003–04	Toronto	15	12	27.1	.491	.000	.724	8.5	.7	1.3	.2	5.1
2003–04	Chicago	53	32	23.2	.466	.000	.675	6.5	1.2	1.3	.1	6.5
2004–05	New York	79	4	15.3	.502	.000	.669	3.6	.5	.7	.1	4.5
Career		587	159	21.7	.502	.038	.645	6.4	.8	1.1	.2	6.6

=== Playoffs ===
Year	Team	GP	GS	MPG	FG%	3P%	FT%	RPG	APG	SPG	BPG	PPG
1997	Detroit	1	0	5.0	**1.000**	–	–	3.0	.0	1.0	.0	4.0
1999	Detroit	5	**5**	24.6	.444	–	**.778**	6.4	.8	.8	.0	6.2
2000	Detroit	3	0	24.3	.500	–	.125	**7.0**	.7	1.0	.0	5.0
2001	Toronto	**11**	0	14.9	.500	–	.500	4.1	.8	.9	**.5**	3.2
2002	Toronto	5	1	**28.8**	.424	–	.667	6.6	**1.4**	**1.8**	.2	**7.2**
Career		25	6	20.4	.470	–	.529	5.4	.9	1.1	.3	4.8

== Post-playing career ==
Williams joined the NBA's "Basketball Without Borders" program, an effort to teach the game and bring resources to underdeveloped nations in Africa, Asia and elsewhere. In Toronto, he was always greeted with a standing ovation when he returned in a Bulls or Knicks uniform. Nicknamed the Junk Yard Dog (or JYD) by Rick Mahorn in his early days as a Detroit Piston for his hard work and hustle (as stated in an interview while he served as a commentator on NBA TV), Williams sometimes referred to himself in the third person.

On January 25, 2006, Williams rejoined the Toronto Raptors as their community representative.

Williams also played a minor role in the Canadian FBI show, Sue Thomas: F.B. Eye. He played Otis Washington, a dealer turned informant.

Williams was hired as Director of Player Development for the national champion Findlay Prep basketball team before becoming assistant coach. In the summer of 2013, Jerome was promoted to the position of Head Coach at Findlay Prep. He stepped down as head coach in the summer of 2014.

Williams continues to be a part of youth development through basketball as he was appointed the President of The Young3 which holds 3-on-3 tournaments for young people ages 9–14.

Williams and other basketball legends have implemented a digital educational program throughout North America, called Shooting For Peace.
