= Lewis Bond =

American football player (born 2003)

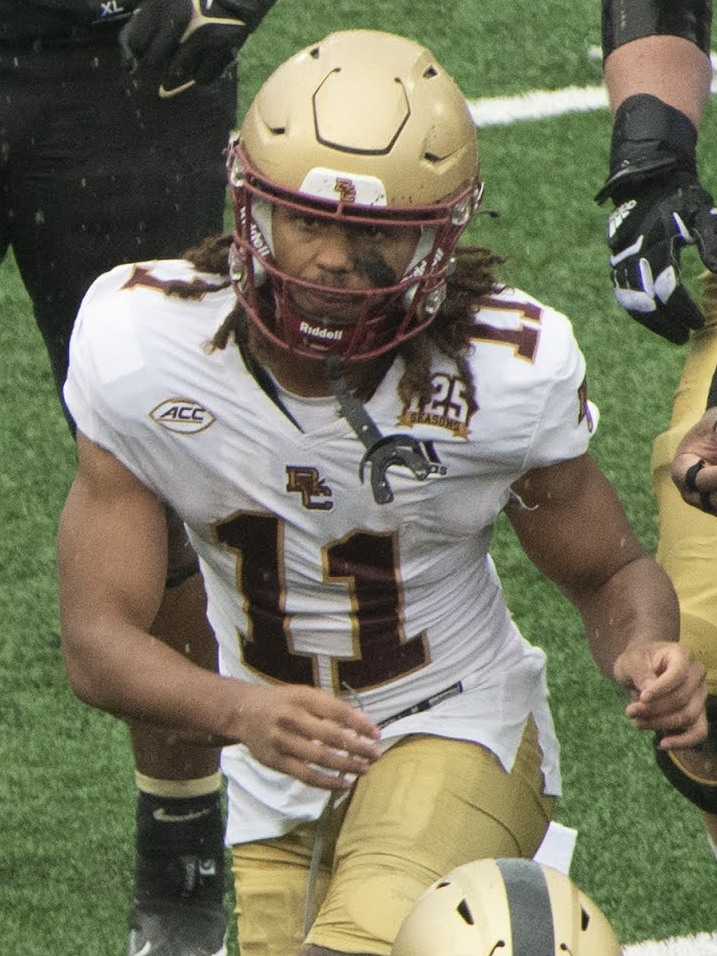
- Bond with Boston College in 2023

No. 82 – Houston Texans
- Position: Wide receiver
- Roster status: Practice squad

Personal information
- Born: May 29, 2003 (age 23)
- Listed height: 5 ft 11 in (1.80 m)
- Listed weight: 190 lb (86 kg)

Career information
- High school: Kenwood (Chicago, Illinois)
- College: Boston College (2021–2025)
- NFL draft: 2026: 6th round, 204th overall pick

Career history
- Houston Texans (2026–present)

Awards and highlights
- Second-team All-ACC (2025)
- Stats at Pro Football Reference

Lewis Bond (born May 29, 2003) is an American professional football wide receiver for the Houston Texans of the National Football League (NFL). He played college football for the Boston College Eagles and was selected by the Texans in the sixth round of the 2026 NFL draft.

== Early life ==
Bond attended high school at Kenwood Academy. Coming out of high school, he was rated as a three-star recruit, where he committed to play college football for the Boston College Eagles over offers from other schools such as Dartmouth, Harvard, Princeton, Tennessee, and Vanderbilt.

== College career ==
During his first two seasons in 2021 and 2022, he played in eight games while utilizing a redshirt, where he hauled in six passes for 57 yards. In the 2023 season, Bond notched 52 receptions for 646 yards and seven touchdowns. During the 2024 season, he totaled 67 receptions for 689 yards and three touchdowns, where for his performance he earned honorable mention all-ACC honors. In the 2025 regular season finale, Bond hauled in eight passes for 171 yards in a victory versus Syracuse. He finished the 2025 season, recording 88 receptions for 993 yards and a touchdown, where for his performance he was named second team all-ACC. In addition, Bond finished the season setting the Boston College record for receptions in a season, and career receptions.

== Professional career ==
Pre-draft measurables
Height	Weight	Arm length	Hand span	Wingspan	40-yard dash	10-yard split	20-yard split	20-yard shuttle	Three-cone drill	Vertical jump	Broad jump	Bench press
5 ft 10 3/4 in (1.80 m)	190 lb (86 kg)	29 1/4 in (0.74 m)	9 7/8 in (0.25 m)	6 ft 0 5/8 in (1.84 m)	4.61 s	1.52 s	2.66 s	4.34 s	7.13 s	35.0 in (0.89 m)	10 ft 3 in (3.12 m)	15 reps
All values from Pro Day

Bond was selected by the Houston Texans in the sixth round with the 204th overall pick of the 2026 NFL draft. The selection was received from the Los Angeles Chargers along with the 123rd overall selection (Wade Woodaz) in exchange for the 117th overall selection (the Chargers selected Travis Burke). Bond was waived by the Texans on August 30 as a part of final roster cuts; he was re-signed to the team's practice squad the next day.
