= Tom London (American football) =

American football player (born 1954)

No. 40
- Position: Cornerback

Personal information
- Born: June 15, 1954 (age 72); Shelby, North Carolina, U.S.
- Listed height: 6 ft 1 in (1.85 m)
- Listed weight: 197 lb (89 kg)

Career information
- High school: Shelby
- College: NC State
- NFL draft: 1978: undrafted

Career history
- Cleveland Browns (1978)
- Stats at Pro Football Reference

Tommy London (born June 15, 1954) is an American former professional football player who was a cornerback for the Cleveland Browns of National Football League (NFL). He played college football for the North Carolina State University.
