= 2022 Green Bay Packers season =

104th season in franchise history

- Owner: Green Bay Packers, Inc.
- General manager: Brian Gutekunst
- Head coach: Matt LaFleur
- Home stadium: Lambeau Field

Results
- Record: 8–9
- Division place: 3rd NFC North
- Playoffs: Did not qualify
- All-Pros: CB Jaire Alexander (2nd team); KR Keisean Nixon (1st team)
- Pro Bowlers: CB Jaire Alexander; G Elgton Jenkins (alternate)

Uniform
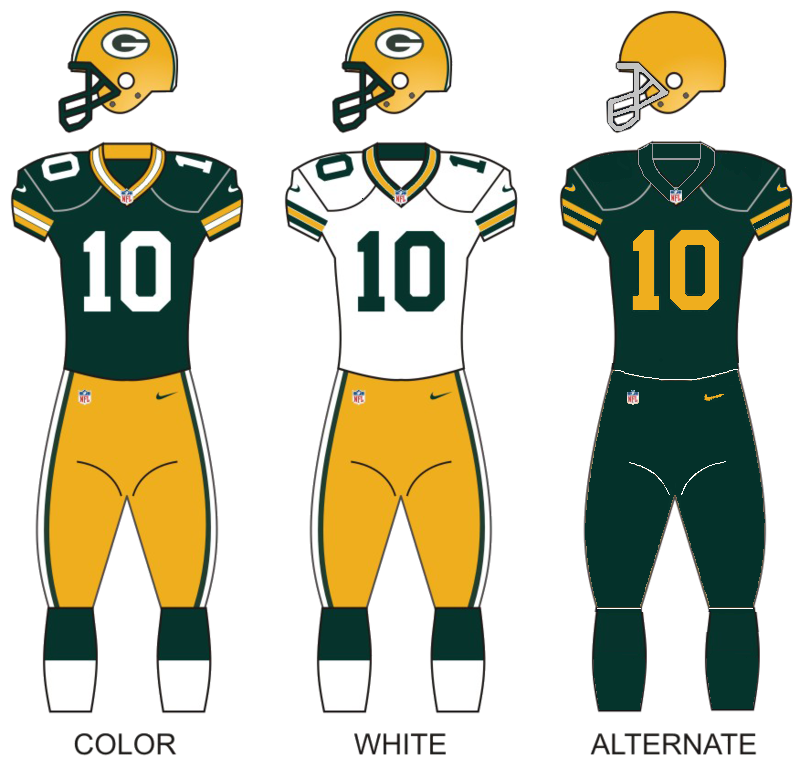

The 2022 season was the Green Bay Packers' 102nd in the National Football League (NFL), their 104th overall and fourth under head coach Matt LaFleur.

The team became the winningest franchise in NFL history when it beat their archrival, the Chicago Bears, in Week 13, who held the record at every season's end since 1921 and were tied with the Packers for a three-week stretch leading up to the game.

After a 3–1 start, the Packers suffered a midseason collapse, going into a five-game losing streak (their longest since 2008) in the process, falling to a 3–6 record. This collapse caused them to fail to improve on their 13-4 record from 2021 after a Week 7 loss to the Washington Commanders, and failed to match it after a loss the following week to the Buffalo Bills.

After falling to 4–8, they rallied to win four straight games and remain in the playoff hunt, but were eliminated from playoff contention when they lost the last game of the season to the division rival Detroit Lions, ensuring the team their first losing season and non–playoff appearance since 2018.

This was the Packers' last season with longtime quarterback Aaron Rodgers before he was traded to the New York Jets in April 2023.

As of 2026, this remains the last time the Packers have missed the playoffs or finished with a losing record.

== Player movements ==
=== Trades ===
Date	Player incoming	Player outgoing
March 18	To Green Bay Packers first-round pick second-round pick	To Las Vegas Raiders; Davante Adams
August 24	To Green Bay Packers seventh-round pick	To Jacksonville Jaguars; Cole Van Lanen

=== Free agents ===
Position	Player	Free agency tag	Date signed	2022 team
WR	Davante Adams	UFA (Franchise tag)	March 8 (Franchise tag); March 18 (Trade)	Las Vegas Raiders
P	Corey Bojorquez	UFA	April 4	Cleveland Browns
ILB	Oren Burks	UFA	March 17	San Francisco 49ers
ILB	De'Vondre Campbell	UFA	March 17	Green Bay Packers
CB	Rasul Douglas	UFA	March 21	Green Bay Packers
RT	Dennis Kelly	UFA	May 10	Indianapolis Colts
CB	Kevin King	UFA	N/A	Free agent
DE	Tyler Lancaster	UFA	25 May	Las Vegas Raiders
OLB	Whitney Mercilus	UFA	April 6	Retired
G	Lucas Patrick	UFA	March 16	Chicago Bears
WR	Equanimeous St. Brown	UFA	March 18	Chicago Bears
CB	Chandon Sullivan	UFA	March 25	Minnesota Vikings
TE	Robert Tonyan	UFA	March 21	Green Bay Packers
WR	Marquez Valdes-Scantling	UFA	March 24	Kansas City Chiefs
WR	Allen Lazard	RFA	June 13	Green Bay Packers
ILB	Krys Barnes	ERFA	April 18	Green Bay Packers
S	Henry Black	ERFA	May 18	New York Giants
TE	Dominique Dafney	ERFA	April 18	Green Bay Packers
C	Jake Hanson	ERFA	April 18	Green Bay Packers
OT	Yosh Nijman	ERFA	April 18	Green Bay Packers
ILB	Randy Ramsey	ERFA	April 18	Green Bay Packers
OLB	Chauncey Rivers	ERFA	November 16	Houston Roughnecks (XFL)
WR	Malik Taylor	ERFA	April 18	Green Bay Packers

=== Re-signings ===
Position	Player	Date
LB	Preston Smith	March 14
QB	Aaron Rodgers	March 15
CB	Jaire Alexander	May 18
G	Elgton Jenkins	December 23

=== Additions ===
Position	Player	Former team	Date
TE	Alizé Mack	Detroit Lions	February 7
K	Dominik Eberle	Carolina Panthers	February 22
P	Pat O'Donnell	Chicago Bears	March 18
DE	Jarran Reed	Kansas City Chiefs	March 23
CB	Keisean Nixon	Las Vegas Raiders	March 26
WR	Sammy Watkins	Baltimore Ravens	April 14
LB	Kobe Jones	Tennessee Titans	May 9
TE	Eli Wolf	Indianapolis Colts	May 12
DE	Chris Slayton	San Francisco 49ers	May 25
K	Gabe Brkic	Minnesota Vikings	June 14
TE	Sal Cannella	New Orleans Breakers	July 21
SS	Dallin Leavitt	Las Vegas Raiders	July 25
C	Ty Clary	Miami Dolphins	July 26
WR	Osirus Mitchell	Birmingham Stallions	July 26
CB	Donte Vaughn	Los Angeles Chargers	July 26
WR	Ishmael Hyman	Michigan Panthers	July 28
S	Micah Abernathy	Houston Gamblers	August 10
RB	Dexter Williams	Philadelphia Stars	August 10
K	Ramiz Ahmed	Pittsburgh Maulers	August 14
TE	Nate Becker	Carolina Panthers	August 16
S	De'Vante Cross	Washington Commanders	August 17
WR	Travis Fulgham	Denver Broncos	August 18
S	Rudy Ford	Jacksonville Jaguars	August 31
OT	Caleb Jones	Green Bay Packers	September 13
RB	Patrick Taylor	Green Bay Packers	September 24
OT	Luke Tenuta	Indianapolis Colts	October 19
SS	Johnathan Abram	Las Vegas	November 10
CB	Corey Ballentine	Green Bay Packers	November 12
RB	Patrick Taylor	Green Bay Packers	November 15
OLB	Justin Hollins	Los Angeles Rams	November 24
S	Innis Gaines	Green Bay Packers	November 29
RB	Patrick Taylor	Green Bay Packers	December 19
WR	Bo Melton	Seattle Seahawks	December 27

=== Subtractions ===
Position	Player	2022 team	Release date
OLB	Za'Darius Smith	Minnesota Vikings	March 14
OT	Billy Turner	Denver Broncos	March 14
WR	Chris Blair		May 12
OT	Jahmir Johnson		May 18
K	JJ Molson		May 20
K	Dominik Eberle	Detroit Lions	June 14
QB	Kurt Benkert	San Francisco 49ers	June 17
TE	Eli Wolf	Washington Commanders	July 22
DE	Hautai Pututau		July 26
S	Tre Sterling		July 26
CB	Raleigh Texada		July 26
LB	Caliph Brice		July 27
WR	Osirus Mitchell	Green Bay Packers	August 10
LS	Steven Wirtel		August 10
K	Gabe Brkic		August 14
C	Cole Schneider		August 15
CB	Donte Vaughn		August 15
RB	B. J. Baylor	Atlanta Falcons	August 16
ILB	Ellis Brooks		August 16
TE	Dominique Dafney	Denver Broncos	August 16
G	George Moore		August 16
OLB	Randy Ramsey		August 16
WR	Malik Taylor	Green Bay Packers	August 17
C	Ty Clary		August 21
LB	Chauncey Manac		August 21
WR	Danny Davis		August 23
S	Vernon Scott	Green Bay Packers	August 23
ILB	Ty Summers	Jacksonville Jaguars	August 28
TE	Nate Becker	Green Bay Packers	August 31
DE	Akiel Byers	Green Bay Packers	August 31
S	Shawn Davis	Green Bay Packers	August 31
S	Innis Gaines	Green Bay Packers	August 31
WR	Ishmael Hyman	Green Bay Packers	August 31
TE	Alizé Mack	Green Bay Packers	August 31
S	Micah Abernathy	Green Bay Packers	August 31
RB	Patrick Taylor	Green Bay Packers	November 1
WR	Amari Rodgers	Houston Texans	November 15
RB	Kylin Hill		November 15
RB	Patrick Taylor	Green Bay Packers	November 23
WR	Sammy Watkins	Baltimore Ravens	December 19
OLB	Tipa Galeai		December 27

=== Draft ===
2022 Green Bay Packers Draft
Round	Selection	Player	Position	College	Notes
1	22	Quay Walker	ILB	Georgia	From Las Vegas (Note: The Packers traded WR Davante Adams to the Las Vegas Raiders in exchange for first- and second-round selections (22nd and 53rd overall).)
1	28	Devonte Wyatt	DE	Georgia	
2	34	Christian Watson	WR	North Dakota State	From Detroit via Minnesota (Note: The Packers traded two second-round selections (53rd and 59th overall) to the Minnesota Vikings in exchange for a second-round selection (34th overall).)
2	53	Traded to Minnesota			From Las Vegas
2	59	Traded to Minnesota			
3	92	Sean Rhyan	G	UCLA	
4	132	Romeo Doubs	WR	Nevada	
4	140	Zach Tom	G	Wake Forest	Compensatory pick
5	171	Traded to Denver (Note: The Packers traded a fifth-round selection (171st overall) to the Denver Broncos in exchange for fifth- and seventh-round selections (179th and 234th overall).)			
5	179	Kingsley Enagbare	OLB	South Carolina	Compensatory pick; from Indianapolis via Denver
6	205	Traded to Houston (Note: The Packers traded a sixth-round selection (205th overall) to the Houston Texans in exchange for WR Randall Cobb.)			
7	228	Tariq Carpenter	S	Georgia Tech	From Chicago via Houston (Note: The Packers traded CB Ka'dar Hollman to the Houston Texans in exchange for a seventh-round selection (228th overall).)
7	234	Jonathan Ford	NT	Miami	From Cleveland via Detroit and Denver
7	249	Rasheed Walker	OT	Penn State	
7	258	Samori Toure	WR	Nebraska	Compensatory pick

=== Undrafted free agent additions ===
2022 Undrafted Free Agents
Position	Player	College	Date
RB	B. J. Baylor	Oregon State	May 2
ILB	Caliph Brice	Florida Atlantic	May 2
ILB	Ellis Brooks	Penn State	May 2
DE	Akial Byers	Missouri	May 2
WR	Danny Davis	Wisconsin	May 2
RB	Tyler Goodson	Iowa	May 2
OT	Jahmir Johnson	Texas A&M	May 2
OT	Caleb Jones	Indiana	May 2
OLB	Chauncey Manac	Louisiana	May 2
G	George Moore	Oregon	May 2
DE	Hauati Pututau	Utah	May 2
C	Cole Schneider	Central Florida	May 2
S	Tre Sterling	Oklahoma State	May 2
CB	Raleigh Texada	Baylor	May 2
LS	Jack Coco	Georgia Tech	May 18

=== Roster cuts ===
The roster was cut to 53 on August 30, 2022.

Position	Player	2022 team
K	Ramiz Ahmed	Green Bay Packers
TE	Sal Cannella	
S	De'Vante Cross	
CB	Kabion Ento	
QB	Danny Etling	Green Bay Packers
WR	Travis Fulgham	Green Bay Packers
CB	Rico Gafford	Green Bay Packers
RB	Tyler Goodson	Green Bay Packers
OLB	LaDarius Hamilton	Green Bay Packers
DE	Jack Heflin	Green Bay Packers
OT	Caleb Jones	Green Bay Packers
LB	Kobe Jones	Green Bay Packers
C	Michal Menet	Green Bay Packers
DE	Chris Slayton	Green Bay Packers
RB	Patrick Taylor	Green Bay Packers
CB	Kiondre Thomas	Green Bay Packers
ILB	Ray Wilborn	Green Bay Packers
RB	Dexter Williams	
WR	Juwann Winfree	Green Bay Packers

== Staff ==
2022 Green Bay Packers staff
Front office: Owner: Publicly held corporation; Executive committee – Board of directors; President/CEO – Mark Murphy; General manager – Brian Gutekunst; Executive vice president/director of football operations – Russ Ball; Co-director of player personnel – John Wojciechowski; Co-director of player personnel – Jon-Eric Sullivan; Director of football operations – Milt Hendrickson; Director of college scouting – Matt Malaspina; Assistant director of college scouting – Patrick Moore; Director of pro personnel – Richmond Williams; Director of football administration/player finance – Melaine Marohl; National scout – Sam Seale; Director of performance psychology/team behavioral health clinician – Chris Carr; Director of player engagement – Grey Ruegamer; Player personnel executive – Lee Gissendaner; Head coaches: Head coach – Matt LaFleur; Offensive coaches: Offensive coordinator – Adam Stenavich; Quarterbacks – Tom Clements; Assistant quarterbacks – Connor Lewis; Running backs – Ben Sirmans; Wide receivers/passing game coordinator – Jason Vrable; Tight ends – John Dunn; Offensive line – Luke Butkus; Assistant offensive line – Ryan Mahaffey; Offensive assistant – Aubrey Pleasant; Offensive quality control – Ramsen Golpashin; Coaching assistant – Quinshon Odom	Defensive coaches: Defensive coordinator – Joe Barry; Defensive line/running game coordinator – Jerry Montgomery; Outside linebackers – Jason Rebrovich; Inside linebackers – Kirk Olivadotti; Defensive backs/passing game coordinator – Jerry Gray; Safeties – Ryan Downard; Defensive quality control – Wendel Davis; Defensive quality control – Justin Hood; Senior analyst – John Donovan; Special teams coaches: Special teams coordinator – Rich Bisaccia; Assistant special teams – Byron Storer; Special teams quality control – Micheal Spurlock; Strength and conditioning: Strength and conditioning coordinator – Chris Gizzi; Strength and conditioning assistant – Thadeus Jackson; Strength and conditioning assistant – Mark Lovat; Strength and conditioning assistant – Grant Thorne

== Final roster ==
2022 Green Bay Packers roster
Quarterbacks (QB): 10 Jordan Love; 12 Aaron Rodgers; Running backs (RB): 28 A. J. Dillon; 33 Aaron Jones; 27 Patrick Taylor; Wide receivers (WR): 18 Randall Cobb; 87 Romeo Doubs; 13 Allen Lazard; 80 Bo Melton; 83 Samori Toure; 9 Christian Watson; Tight ends (TE): 84 Tyler Davis; 81 Josiah Deguara; 89 Marcedes Lewis; 85 Robert Tonyan	Offensive linemen (OL): 69 David Bakhtiari T; 74 Elgton Jenkins G/T; 72 Caleb Jones T; 71 Josh Myers C; 70 Royce Newman G/T; 73 Yosh Nijman T; 76 Jon Runyan Jr. G; 78 Luke Tenuta T; 50 Zach Tom T/G; 63 Rasheed Walker T; Defensive linemen (DL): 97 Kenny Clark NT; 99 Jonathan Ford NT; 90 Jarran Reed DE; 93 Tedarrell Slaton DE/NT; 95 Devonte Wyatt DE	Linebackers (LB): 51 Krys Barnes ILB; 59 De'Vondre Campbell ILB; 55 Kingsley Enagbare OLB; 53 Jonathan Garvin OLB; 47 Justin Hollins OLB; 58 Isaiah McDuffie ILB; 91 Preston Smith OLB; 7 Quay Walker ILB; 45 Eric Wilson ILB; Defensive backs (DB): 23 Jaire Alexander CB; 31 Adrian Amos SS; 35 Corey Ballentine CB; 24 Tariq Carpenter SS; 29 Rasul Douglas CB; 20 Rudy Ford FS; 38 Innis Gaines FS; 22 Shemar Jean-Charles CB; 6 Dallin Leavitt SS; 25 Keisean Nixon CB; 26 Darnell Savage FS; Special teams (ST): 56 Jack Coco LS; 2 Mason Crosby K; 16 Pat O'Donnell P	Practice squad: 17 Ramiz Ahmed K; 49 Austin Allen TE; 8 Matt Ammendola K; 82 Jeff Cotton WR; 79 Jean Delance T; 19 Danny Etling QB; 86 Travis Fulgham WR; 39 Tyler Goodson RB; 46 Nick Guggemos TE; 54 LaDarius Hamilton OLB; 65 Michal Menet C; 98 Chris Slayton DE; 48 DQ Thomas ILB; 43 Kiondre Thomas CB; 57 Tim Ward OLB; 88 Juwann Winfree WR; Reserve: 52 Rashan Gary OLB (IR); 67 Jake Hanson G/C (IR); 94 Dean Lowry DE (IR); 75 Sean Rhyan G (Susp.); 36 Vernon Scott FS (IR); 21 Eric Stokes CB (IR); Rookies in italics 53 active, 6 reserve, 16 practice squad

== Preseason ==
The Packers' preseason opponents were announced on May 12.

Week	Date	Opponent	Result	Record	Venue	Recap
1	August 12	at San Francisco 49ers	L 21–28	0–1	Levi's Stadium	Recap
2	August 19	New Orleans Saints	W 20–10	1–1	Lambeau Field	Recap
3	August 25	at Kansas City Chiefs	L 10–17	1–2	Arrowhead Stadium	Recap

== Regular season ==
On May 4, the NFL announced that the Packers would play the New York Giants during Week 5 on October 9 at Tottenham Hotspur Stadium in London, as part of the league's International Series. The game would kickoff at 2:30 p.m. BST/8:30 a.m. CDT, and was televised by the NFL Network, with the Packers serving as the home team. Prior to 2022, the Packers were the only team that had yet to play in an international game. On May 11, the NFL announced that the Packers would host the Dallas Cowboys during Week 10 on November 13.

The remainder of the Packers' 2022 schedule, with exact dates and times, was announced on May 12.

=== Schedule ===
Week	Date	Opponent	Result	Record	Venue	Recap
1	September 11	at **Minnesota Vikings**	**L** 7–23	0–1	U.S. Bank Stadium	Recap
2	September 18	**Chicago Bears**	**W** 27–10	1–1	Lambeau Field	Recap
3	September 25	at Tampa Bay Buccaneers	**W** 14–12	2–1	Raymond James Stadium	Recap
4	October 2	New England Patriots	**W** 27–24 (OT)	3–1	Lambeau Field	Recap
5	October 9	New York Giants	**L** 22–27	3–2	(United Kingdom) Tottenham Hotspur Stadium (London)	Recap
6	October 16	New York Jets	**L** 10–27	3–3	Lambeau Field	Recap
7	October 23	at Washington Commanders	**L** 21–23	3–4	FedExField	Recap
8	October 30	at Buffalo Bills	**L** 17–27	3–5	Highmark Stadium	Recap
9	November 6	at **Detroit Lions**	**L** 9–15	3–6	Ford Field	Recap
10	November 13	Dallas Cowboys	**W** 31–28 (OT)	4–6	Lambeau Field	Recap
11	November 17	Tennessee Titans	**L** 17–27	4–7	Lambeau Field	Recap
12	November 27	at Philadelphia Eagles	**L** 33–40	4–8	Lincoln Financial Field	Recap
13	December 4	at **Chicago Bears**	**W** 28–19	5–8	Soldier Field	Recap
14	Bye					
15	December 19	Los Angeles Rams	**W** 24–12	6–8	Lambeau Field	Recap
16	December 25	at Miami Dolphins	**W** 26–20	7–8	Hard Rock Stadium	Recap
17	January 1, 2023	**Minnesota Vikings**	**W** 41–17	8–8	Lambeau Field	Recap
18	January 8, 2023	**Detroit Lions**	**L** 16–20	8–9	Lambeau Field	Recap

Note: Intra-division opponents are in bold text.

=== Game summaries ===
==== Week 1: at Minnesota Vikings ====
Week 1: Green Bay Packers at Minnesota Vikings – Game summary

Quarter	1	2	3	4	Total
Packers	0	0	7	0	**7**
**Vikings**	7	10	3	3	**23**

at U.S. Bank Stadium, Minneapolis, Minnesota

- Date: September 11
- Game time: 3:25 p.m. CDT
- Game weather: None (indoor stadium)
- Game attendance: 66,959
- Referee: Bill Vinovich
- TV announcers (Fox): Kevin Burkhardt, Greg Olsen, Tom Rinaldi and Erin Andrews
- Recap, Game Book

Game information

**First quarter**

- MIN – Justin Jefferson 5-yard pass from Kirk Cousins (Greg Joseph kick), 9:17. Vikings 7–0. **Drive: 10 plays, 78 yards, 5:43.**

**Second quarter**

- MIN – Greg Joseph 28-yard field goal, 3:54. Vikings 10–0. **Drive: 8 plays, 89 yards, 4:04.**
- MIN – Justin Jefferson 36-yard pass from Kirk Cousins (Greg Joseph kick), 0:35. Vikings 17–0. **Drive: 7 plays, 74 yards, 2:23.**

**Third quarter**

- MIN – Greg Joseph 56-yard field goal, 9:46. Vikings 20–0. **Drive: 4 plays, −5 yards, 2:20.**
- GB – A. J. Dillon 2-yard run (Mason Crosby kick), 5:16. Vikings 20–7. **Drive: 7 plays, 75 yards, 4:30.**

**Fourth quarter**

- MIN – Greg Joseph 29-yard field goal, 6:48. Vikings 23–7. **Drive: 12 plays, 74 yards, 5:04.**

**Top passers**

- GB – Aaron Rodgers – 22/34, 195 yards, INT
- MIN – Kirk Cousins – 23/32, 277 yards, 2 TD

**Top rushers**

- GB – Aaron Jones – 5 rushes, 49 yards
- MIN – Dalvin Cook – 20 rushes, 90 yards

**Top receivers**

- GB – A. J. Dillon – 5 receptions, 46 yards
- MIN – Justin Jefferson – 9 receptions, 184 yards, 2 TD

With the loss, the Packers started the season 0-1 for the second consecutive season.

==== Week 2: vs. Chicago Bears ====
Week 2: Chicago Bears at Green Bay Packers – Game summary

Quarter	1	2	3	4	Total
Bears	7	0	3	0	**10**
**Packers**	3	21	0	3	**27**

at Lambeau Field, Green Bay, Wisconsin

- Date: September 18
- Game time: 7:20 p.m. CDT
- Game weather: Cloudy, 73 °F (23 °C)
- Game attendance: 78,350
- Referee: Craig Wrolstad
- TV announcers (NBC): Mike Tirico, Cris Collinsworth and Melissa Stark
- Recap, Game Book

Game information

**First quarter**

- GB – Mason Crosby 40-yard field goal, 8:33. Packers 3–0. **Drive: 13 plays, 53 yards, 6:27.**
- CHI – Justin Fields 3-yard run (Cairo Santos kick), 4:37. Bears 7–3. **Drive: 7 plays, 71 yards, 3:56.**

**Second quarter**

- GB – Aaron Jones 15-yard run (Mason Crosby kick), 14:54. Packers 10–7. **Drive: 9 plays, 75 yards, 4:43.**
- GB – Aaron Jones 8-yard pass from Aaron Rodgers (Mason Crosby kick), 4:36. Packers 17–7. **Drive: 9 plays, 54 yards, 5:35.**
- GB – Allen Lazard 8-yard pass from Aaron Rodgers (Mason Crosby kick), 0:32. Packers 24–7. **Drive: 7 plays, 67 yards, 2:38.**

**Third quarter**

- CHI – Cairo Santos 44-yard field goal, 5:11. Packers 24–10. **Drive: 7 plays, 43 yards, 4:02.**

**Fourth quarter**

- GB – Mason Crosby 28-yard field goal, 2:28. Packers 27–10. **Drive: 10 plays, 89 yards, 5:39.**

**Top passers**

- CHI – Justin Fields – 7/11, 70 yards, INT
- GB – Aaron Rodgers – 19/25, 234 yards, 2 TD

**Top rushers**

- CHI – David Montgomery – 15 rushes, 122 yards
- GB – Aaron Jones – 15 rushes, 132 yards, TD

**Top receivers**

- CHI – Equanimeous St. Brown – 2 receptions, 39 yards
- GB – Sammy Watkins – 3 receptions, 93 yards

With the win, the Packers improved to 1-1.

==== Week 3: at Tampa Bay Buccaneers ====
Week 3: Green Bay Packers at Tampa Bay Buccaneers – Game summary

Quarter	1	2	3	4	Total
**Packers**	7	7	0	0	**14**
Buccaneers	3	0	3	6	**12**

at Raymond James Stadium, Tampa, Florida

- Date: September 25
- Game time: 4:25 p.m. EDT/3:25 p.m. CDT
- Game weather: Cloudy, 88 °F (31 °C)
- Game attendance: 69,197
- Referee: Scott Novak
- TV announcers (Fox): Kevin Burkhardt, Greg Olsen, Erin Andrews and Tom Rinaldi
- Recap, Game Book

Game information

**First quarter**

- TB – Ryan Succop 45-yard field goal, 9:05. Buccaneers 3–0. **Drive: 10 plays, 48 yards, 5:55.**
- GB – Romeo Doubs 5-yard pass from Aaron Rodgers (Mason Crosby kick), 3:01. Packers 7–3. **Drive: 10 plays, 75 yards, 6;04.**

**Second quarter**

- GB – Allen Lazard 6-yard pass from Aaron Rodgers (Mason Crosby kick), 8:44. Packers 14–3. **Drive: 12 plays, 71 yards, 6:49.**

**Third quarter**

- TB – Ryan Succop 45-yard field goal, 6:22. Packers 14–6. **Drive: 5 plays, 20 yards, 1:30.**

**Fourth quarter**

- TB – Russell Gage 1-yard pass from Tom Brady (pass failed), 0:14. Packers 14–12. **Drive: 13 plays, 89 yards, 2;50.**

**Top passers**

- GB – Aaron Rodgers – 27/35, 255 yards, 2 TD, INT
- TB – Tom Brady – 31/42, 271 yards, TD

**Top rushers**

- GB – Aaron Jones – 12 rushes, 36 yards
- TB – Leonard Fournette – 12 rushes, 35 yards

**Top receivers**

- GB – Romeo Doubs – 8 receptions, 73 yards, TD
- TB – Russell Gage – 12 receptions, 87 yards, TD

With the win, the Packers improved to 2-1.

==== Week 4: vs. New England Patriots ====
Week 4: New England Patriots at Green Bay Packers – Game summary

Quarter	1	2	3	4	OT	Total
Patriots	3	7	7	7	0	**24**
**Packers**	0	7	10	7	3	**27**

at Lambeau Field, Green Bay, Wisconsin

- Date: October 2
- Game time: 3:25 p.m. CDT
- Game weather: Sunny, 66 °F (19 °C)
- Game attendance: 78,317
- Referee: Adrian Hill
- TV announcers (CBS): Jim Nantz, Tony Romo and Tracy Wolfson
- Recap, Game Book

Game information

**First quarter**

- NE – Nick Folk 37-yard field goal, 9:45. Patriots 3–0. **Drive: 10 plays, 56 yards, 5:15.**

**Second quarter**

- GB – Christian Watson 15-yard run (Mason Crosby kick), 13:00. Packers 7–3. **Drive: 6 plays, 50 yards, 3:03.**
- NE – Jack Jones 40-yard interception return (Nick Folk kick), 0:13. Patriots 10–7.

**Third quarter**

- GB – Robert Tonyan 20-yard pass from Aaron Rodgers (Mason Crosby kick), 9:20. Packers 14–10. **Drive: 10 plays, 81 yards, 5:40.**
- NE – DeVante Parker 25-yard pass from Bailey Zappe (Nick Folk kick), 4:52. Patriots 17–14. **Drive: 7 plays, 75 yards, 4:28.**
- GB – Mason Crosby 38-yard field goal, 0:05. Tied 17–17. **Drive: 8 plays, 59 yards, 4:47.**

**Fourth quarter**

- NE – Damien Harris 5-yard run (Nick Folk kick), 11:14. Patriots 24–17. **Drive: 7 plays, 66 yards, 3:51.**
- GB – Romeo Doubs 13-yard pass from Aaron Rodgers (Mason Crosby kick), 6:14. Tied 24–24. **Drive: 9 plays, 75 yards, 5:00.**

**Overtime**

- GB – Mason Crosby 31-yard field goal, 0:00. Packers 27–24. **Drive: 12 plays, 77 yards, 6:47.**

**Top passers**

- NE – Bailey Zappe – 10/15, 99 yards, TD
- GB – Aaron Rodgers – 21/35, 251 yards, 2 TD, INT

**Top rushers**

- NE – Damien Harris – 18 rushes, 86 yards, TD
- GB – Aaron Jones – 16 rushes, 110 yards

**Top receivers**

- NE – Rhamondre Stevenson – 4 receptions, 23 yards
- GB – Allen Lazard – 6 receptions, 116 yards

With the win, the Packers improved to 3-1.

==== Week 5: vs. New York Giants ====
NFL London games

Week 5: New York Giants at Green Bay Packers – Game summary

Quarter	1	2	3	4	Total
**Giants**	3	7	3	14	**27**
Packers	10	10	0	2	**22**

at Tottenham Hotspur Stadium, London, England

- Date: October 9
- Game time: 2:30 p.m. BST/8:30 a.m. CDT
- Game weather: Sunny, 64 °F (18 °C)
- Game attendance: 61,024
- Referee: Alex Kemp
- TV announcers (NFLN): Kevin Kugler, Mark Sanchez, Laura Okmin and Stacey Dales
- Recap, Game Book

Game information

**First quarter**

- GB – Mason Crosby 46-yard field goal, 11:05. Packers 3–0. **Drive: 9 plays, 49 yards, 3:55.**
- GB – Allen Lazard 4-yard pass from Aaron Rodgers (Mason Crosby kick), 3:19. Packers 10–0. **Drive: 5 plays, 60 yards, 2:15.**
- NYG – Graham Gano 48-yard field goal, 0:09. Packers 10–3. **Drive: 8 plays, 45 yards, 3:10.**

**Second quarter**

- GB – Marcedes Lewis 2-yard pass from Aaron Rodgers (Mason Crosby kick), 7:25. Packers 17–3. **Drive: 13 plays, 75 yards, 7:44.**
- NYG – Daniel Bellinger 2-yard run (Graham Gano kick), 1:15. Packers 17–10. **Drive: 11 plays, 86 yards, 6:10.**
- GB – Mason Crosby 48-yard field goal, 0:00. Packers 20–10. **Drive: 8 plays, 45 yards, 1:15.**

**Third quarter**

- NYG – Graham Gano 37-yard field goal, 7:57. Packers 20–13. **Drive: 11 plays, 56 yards, 7:03.**

**Fourth quarter**

- NYG – Gary Brightwell 2-yard run (Graham Gano kick), 10:08. Tied 20–20. **Drive: 15 plays, 91 yards, 8:07.**
- NYG – Saquon Barkley 2-yard run (Graham Gano kick), 6:08. Giants 27–20. **Drive: 6 plays, 60 yards, 3:34.**
- GB – Jamie Gillan punt blocked out of bounds for a safety, 0:11. Giants 27–22.

**Top passers**

- NYG – Daniel Jones – 21/27, 217 yards
- GB – Aaron Rodgers – 25/39, 222 yards, 2 TD

**Top rushers**

- NYG – Saquon Barkley – 13 rushes, 70 yards, TD
- GB – Aaron Jones – 13 rushes, 63 yards

**Top receivers**

- NYG – Darius Slayton – 6 receptions, 79 yards
- GB – Randall Cobb – 7 receptions, 99 yards

Despite leading for most of the game, the Giants outscored the Packers 17-2 in the second half. Aaron Rodgers attempted a Hail Mary pass at the end, but it was deflected. With the upset loss, their 3-game winning streak was snapped and they fell to 3-2.

==== Week 6: vs. New York Jets ====
Week 6: New York Jets at Green Bay Packers – Game summary

Quarter	1	2	3	4	Total
**Jets**	0	3	14	10	**27**
Packers	0	3	7	0	**10**

at Lambeau Field, Green Bay, Wisconsin

- Date: October 16
- Game time: 12:00 p.m. CDT
- Game weather: Cloudy, 49 °F (9 °C)
- Game attendance: 78,343
- Referee: Clete Blakeman
- TV announcers (Fox): Kevin Burkhardt, Greg Olsen, Erin Andrews and Tom Rinaldi
- Recap, Game Book

Game information

**First quarter**

- No scoring plays.

**Second quarter**

- NYJ – Greg Zuerlein 32-yard field goal, 5:46. Jets 3–0. **Drive: 6 plays, 20 yards, 2:58.**
- GB – Mason Crosby 29-yard field goal, 9:55. Tied 3–3. **Drive: 6 plays, 46 yards, 0:31.**

**Third quarter**

- NYJ – Braxton Berrios 20-yard run (Greg Zuerlein kick), 8:11. Jets 10–3. **Drive: 4 plays, 74 yards, 2:10.**
- NYJ – Will Parks 20-yard return of blocked punt (Greg Zuerlein kick), 5:43. Jets 17–3.
- GB – Allen Lazard 25-yard pass from Aaron Rodgers (Mason Crosby kick), 2:35. Jets 17–10. **Drive: 6 plays, 75 yards, 3:08.**

**Fourth quarter**

- NYJ – Breece Hall 34-yard run (Greg Zuerlein kick), 14:52. Jets 24–10. **Drive: 5 play, 66 yards, 2:43.**
- NYJ – Greg Zuerlein 23-yard field goal, 2:34. Jets 27–10. **Drive: 13 plays, 58 yards, 6:38.**

**Top passers**

- NYJ – Zach Wilson – 10/18, 110 yards
- GB – Aaron Rodgers – 26/41, 246 yards, TD

**Top rushers**

- NYJ – Breece Hall – 20 rushes, 116 yards, TD
- GB – A. J. Dillon – 10 rushes, 41 yards

**Top receivers**

- NYJ – Corey Davis – 2 receptions, 52 yards
- GB – Robert Tonyan – 10 receptions, 90 yards

The Packers tuned in a disappointing performance against the Jets. With the upset loss, the Packers fell to 3-3.

==== Week 7: at Washington Commanders ====
Week 7: Green Bay Packers at Washington Commanders – Game summary

Quarter	1	2	3	4	Total
Packers	7	7	0	7	**21**
**Commanders**	3	7	10	3	**23**

at FedExField, Landover, Maryland

- Date: October 23
- Game time: 1:00 p.m. EDT/12:00 p.m. CDT
- Game weather: Cloudy, 62 °F (17 °C)
- Game attendance: 60,427
- Referee: Clay Martin
- TV announcers (Fox): Adam Amin, Daryl Johnston and Pam Oliver
- Recap, Game Book

Game information

**First quarter**

- GB – Aaron Jones 4-yard pass from Aaron Rodgers (Mason Crosby kick), 6:38. Packers 7–0. **Drive: 7 plays, 42 yards, 4:22.**
- WAS – Joey Slye 22-yard field goal, 2:04. Packers 7–3. **Drive: 6 plays, 14 yards, 2:51.**

**Second quarter**

- GB – De'Vondre Campbell 63-yard interception return (Mason Crosby kick), 13:29. Packers 14–3.
- WAS – Antonio Gibson 9-yard pass from Taylor Heinicke (Joey Slye kick), 7:21. Packers 14–10. **Drive: 12 plays, 83 yards, 6:08.**

**Third quarter**

- WAS – Terry McLaurin 37-yard pass from Taylor Heinicke (Joey Slye kick), 11:49. Commanders 17–14. **Drive: 5 plays, 74 yards, 3:11.**
- WAS – Joey Slye 31-yard field goal, 0:08. Commanders 20–14. **Drive: 16 plays, 72 yards, 8:48.**

**Fourth quarter**

- WAS – Joey Slye 19-yard field goal, 6:40. Commanders 23–14. **Drive: 9 plays, 61 yards, 4:42.**
- GB – Aaron Jones 21-yard pass from Aaron Rodgers (Mason Crosby kick), 3:26. Commanders 23–21. **Drive: 8 plays, 75 yards, 3:14.**

**Top passers**

- GB – Aaron Rodgers – 23/35, 194 yards, 2 TD
- WAS – Taylor Heinicke – 20/33, 201 yards, 2 TD, INT

**Top rushers**

- GB – Aaron Jones – 8 rushes, 23 yards
- WAS – Brian Robinson Jr. – 20 rushes, 73 yards

**Top receivers**

- GB – Allen Lazard – 6 receptions, 55 yards
- WAS – Terry McLaurin – 5 receptions, 73 yards, TD

The Packers attempted a trick play at the end, but it failed. With their third straight loss, the Packers fell to 3-4.

==== Week 8: at Buffalo Bills ====
Week 8: Green Bay Packers at Buffalo Bills – Game summary

Quarter	1	2	3	4	Total
Packers	0	7	3	7	**17**
**Bills**	7	17	3	0	**27**

at Highmark Stadium, Orchard Park, New York

- Date: October 30
- Game time: 8:20 p.m. EDT/7:20 p.m. CDT
- Game weather: Partly cloudy, 50 °F (10 °C)
- Game attendance: 70,863
- Referee: Ronald Torbert
- TV announcers (NBC): Mike Tirico, Cris Collinsworth and Melissa Stark
- Recap, Game Book

Game information

**First quarter**

- BUF – Dawson Knox 1-yard pass from Josh Allen (Tyler Bass kick), 3:34. Bills 7–0. **Drive: 8 plays, 61 yards, 5:13.**

**Second quarter**

- BUF – Stefon Diggs 26-yard pass from Josh Allen (Tyler Bass kick), 14:53. Bills 14–0. **Drive: 4 plays, 51 yards, 1:48.**
- GB – Romeo Doubs 19-yard pass from Aaron Rodgers (Mason Crosby kick), 6:15. Bills 14–7. **Drive: 12 plays, 80 yards, 8:38.**
- BUF – Isaiah McKenzie 7-yard run (Tyler Bass kick), 1:54. Bills 21–7. **Drive: 8 plays, 80 yards, 4:21.**
- BUF – Tyler Bass 42-yard field goal, 0:00. Bills 24–7. **Drive: 4 plays, 56 yards, 0:53.**

**Third quarter**

- GB – Mason Crosby 38-yard field goal, 10:20. Bills 24–10. **Drive: 8 plays, 72 yards, 4:40.**
- BUF – Tyler Bass 38-yard field goal, 5:59. Bills 27–10. **Drive: 8 plays, 51 yards, 4:21.**

**Fourth quarter**

- GB – Samori Toure 37-yard pass from Aaron Rodgers (Mason Crosby kick), 6:32. Bills 27–17. **Drive: 8 plays, 95 yards, 3:33.**

**Top passers**

- GB – Aaron Rodgers – 19/30, 203 yards, 2 TD, INT
- BUF – Josh Allen – 13/25, 218 yards, 2 TD, 2 INT

**Top rushers**

- GB – Aaron Jones – 20 rushes, 143 yards
- BUF – Devin Singletary – 14 rushes, 67 yards

**Top receivers**

- GB – Robert Tonyan – 5 receptions, 35 yards
- BUF – Stefon Diggs – 6 receptions, 108 yards, TD

With the loss, the Packers fell to 3-5 and suffered their fourth consecutive loss.

==== Week 9: at Detroit Lions ====
Week 9: Green Bay Packers at Detroit Lions – Game summary

Quarter	1	2	3	4	Total
Packers	0	0	6	3	**9**
**Lions**	0	8	0	7	**15**

at Ford Field, Detroit, Michigan

- Date: November 6
- Game time: 1:00 p.m. EST/12:00 p.m. CST
- Game weather: None (indoor stadium)
- Game attendance: 63,379
- Referee: Tra Blake
- TV announcers (Fox): Kevin Burkhardt, Greg Olsen, Tom Rinaldi and Erin Andrews
- Recap, Game Book

Game information

**First quarter**

- No scoring plays.

**Second quarter**

- DET – Shane Zylstra 1-yard pass from Jared Goff (Jamaal Williams run), 0:15. Lions 8–0. **Drive: 8 plays, 61 yards, 2:20.**

**Third quarter**

- GB – Allen Lazard 20-yard pass from Aaron Rodgers (pass failed), 4:53. Lions 8–6. **Drive: 7 plays, 54 yards, 3:22.**

**Fourth quarter**

- DET – James Mitchell 3-yard pass from Jared Goff (Michael Badgley kick), 14:51. Lions 15–6. **Drive: 13 plays, 70 yards, 5:02.**
- GB – Mason Crosby 25-yard field goal, 6:36. Lions 15–9. **Drive: 14 plays, 68 yards, 8:15.**

**Top passers**

- GB – Aaron Rodgers – 23/43, 291 yards, TD, 3 INT
- DET – Jared Goff – 14/26, 137 yards, 2 TD, INT

**Top rushers**

- GB – Aaron Rodgers – 4 rushes, 40 yards
- DET – Jamaal Williams – 24 rushes, 81 yards

**Top receivers**

- GB – Josiah Deguara – 5 receptions, 41 yards
- DET – Amon-Ra St. Brown – 4 receptions, 55 yards

With the upset loss, the Packers fell to 3-6 and lost their fifth consecutive game (their longest losing streak since 2008).

==== Week 10: vs. Dallas Cowboys ====
Week 10: Dallas Cowboys at Green Bay Packers – Game summary

Quarter	1	2	3	4	OT	Total
Cowboys	0	14	14	0	0	**28**
**Packers**	0	14	0	14	3	**31**

at Lambeau Field, Green Bay, Wisconsin

- Date: November 13
- Game time: 3:25 p.m. CST
- Game weather: Cloudy, 33 °F (1 °C)
- Game attendance: 78,433
- Referee: Brad Allen
- TV announcers (Fox): Kevin Burkhardt, Greg Olsen, Erin Andrews and Tom Rinaldi
- Recap, Game Book

Game information

**First quarter**

- No scoring plays.

**Second quarter**

- DAL – CeeDee Lamb 3-yard pass from Dak Prescott (Brett Maher kick), 9:52. Cowboys 7–0. **Drive: 17 plays, 83 yards, 8:21.**
- GB – Christian Watson 58-yard pass from Aaron Rodgers (Mason Crosby kick), 4:54. Tied 7–7. **Drive: 3 plays, 67 yards, 2:03.**
- GB – Aaron Jones 12-yard run (Mason Crosby kick), 1:42. Packers 14–7. **Drive: 3 plays, 24 yards, 0:38.**
- DAL – Dalton Schultz 5-yard pass from Dak Prescott (Brett Maher kick), 0:08. Tied 14–14. **Drive: 8 plays, 66 yards, 1:34.**

**Third quarter**

- DAL – Tony Pollard 13-yard run (Brett Maher kick), 7:14. Cowboys 21–14. **Drive: 4 plays, 45 yards, 1:15.**
- DAL – CeeDee Lamb 35-yard pass from Dak Prescott (Brett Maher kick), 2:47. Cowboys 28–14. **Drive: 7 plays, 86 yards, 2:47.**

**Fourth quarter**

- GB – Christian Watson 39-yard pass from Aaron Rodgers (Mason Crosby kick), 13:23. Cowboys 28–21. **Drive: 9 plays, 76 yards, 4:24.**
- GB – Christian Watson 7-yard pass from Aaron Rodgers (Mason Crosby kick), 2:29. Tied 28–28. **Drive: 10 plays, 89 yards, 6:28.**

**Overtime**

- GB – Mason Crosby 28-yard field goal, 3:06. Packers 31–28. **Drive: 6 plays, 55 yards, 3:09.**

**Top passers**

- DAL– Dak Prescott – 27/46, 265 yards, 3 TD, 2 INT
- GB – Aaron Rodgers – 14/20, 224 yards, 3 TD

**Top rushers**

- DAL – Tony Pollard – 22 rushes, 115 yards, TD
- GB – Aaron Jones – 24 rushes, 138 yards, TD

**Top receivers**

- DAL – CeeDee Lamb – 11 receptions, 150 yards, 2 TD
- GB – Christian Watson – 4 receptions, 107 yards, 3 TD

With the win, the Packers improved to 4-6 and snapped their 5-game losing streak.

==== Week 11: vs. Tennessee Titans ====
Week 11: Tennessee Titans at Green Bay Packers – Game summary

Quarter	1	2	3	4	Total
**Titans**	7	7	6	7	**27**
Packers	6	0	11	0	**17**

at Lambeau Field, Green Bay, Wisconsin

- Date: November 17
- Game time: 7:20 p.m. CST
- Game weather: Cloudy, 26 °F (−3 °C)
- Game attendance: 77,506
- Referee: Bill Vinovich
- TV announcers (WITI/WGBA/Prime Video): Al Michaels, Kirk Herbstreit and Kaylee Hartung
- Recap, Game Book

Game information

**First quarter**

- TEN – Dontrell Hilliard 14-yard pass from Ryan Tannehill (Josh Lambo kick), 10:31. Titans 7–0. **Drive: 8 plays, 83 yards, 4:29.**
- GB – Christian Watson 14-yard pass from Aaron Rodgers (kick blocked), 0:00. Titans 7–6. **Drive: 11 plays, 78 yards, 7:01.**

**Second quarter**

- TEN – Derrick Henry 4-yard run (Josh Lambo kick), 0:32. Titans 14–6. **Drive: 9 plays, 41 yards, 2:49.**

**Third quarter**

- GB – Mason Crosby 39-yard field goal, 8:25. Titans 14–9. **Drive: 13 plays, 51 yards, 6:35.**
- TEN – Austin Hooper 3-yard pass from Derrick Henry (kick failed, hit right upright), 5:17. Titans 20–9. **Drive: 6 plays, 91 yards, 3:08.**
- GB – Christian Watson 8-yard pass from Aaron Rodgers (Aaron Rodgers–Aaron Jones pass), 2:04. Titans 20–17. **Drive: 7 plays, 69 yards, 3:13.**

**Fourth quarter**

- TEN – Austin Hooper 16-yard pass from Ryan Tannehill (Josh Lambo kick), 14:55. Titans 27–17. **Drive: 5 plays, 63 yards, 2:09.**

**Top passers**

- TEN– Ryan Tannehill – 22/27, 333 yards, 2 TD, INT
- GB – Aaron Rodgers – 24/39, 224 yards, 2 TD

**Top rushers**

- TEN – Derrick Henry – 28 rushes, 87 yards, TD
- GB – Aaron Jones – 12 rushes, 40 yards

**Top receivers**

- TEN – Treylon Burks – 7 receptions, 111 yards
- GB – Randall Cobb – 6 receptions, 73 yards

With the loss, Green Bay fell to 4-7.

==== Week 12: at Philadelphia Eagles ====
Week 12: Green Bay Packers at Philadelphia Eagles – Game summary

Quarter	1	2	3	4	Total
Packers	14	6	3	10	**33**
**Eagles**	13	14	7	6	**40**

at Lincoln Financial Field, Philadelphia, Pennsylvania

- Date: November 27
- Game time: 8:20 p.m. EST/7:20 p.m. CST
- Game weather: Cloudy, 61 °F (16 °C)
- Game attendance: 69,879
- Referee: Shawn Smith
- TV announcers (NBC): Mike Tirico, Cris Collinsworth and Melissa Stark
- Recap, Game Book

Game information

**First quarter**

- PHI – Kenneth Gainwell 4-yard run (Jake Elliott kick), 11:19. Eagles 7–0. **Drive: 10 plays, 75 yards, 3:41.**
- PHI – Miles Sanders 4-yard run (kick failed, wide right), 9:02. Eagles 13–0. **Drive: 3 plays, 29 yards, 1:21.**
- GB – A. J. Dillon 20-yard run (Mason Crosby kick), 6:40. Eagles 13–7. **Drive: 4 plays, 59 yards, 2:22.**
- GB – Randall Cobb 11-yard pass from Aaron Rodgers (Mason Crosby kick), 3:09. Packers 14–13. **Drive: 5 plays, 37 yards, 1:51.**

**Second quarter**

- PHI – Miles Sanders 2-yard run (Jake Elliott kick), 14:54. Eagles 20–14. **Drive: 7 plays, 75 yards, 3:15.**
- GB – Aaron Jones 23-yard pass from Aaron Rodgers (kick failed, wide right), 7:41. Tied 20–20. **Drive: 3 plays, 13 yards, 0:57.**
- PHI – Quez Watkins 30-yard pass from Jalen Hurts (Jake Elliott kick), 3:09. Eagles 27–20. **Drive: 9 plays, 71 yards, 2:03.**

**Third quarter**

- PHI – A. J. Brown 6-yard pass from Jalen Hurts (Jake Elliott kick), 7:19. Eagles 34–20. **Drive: 11 plays, 86 yards, 5:23.**
- GB – Mason Crosby 29-yard field goal, 2:03. Eagles 34–23. **Drive: 10 plays, 64 yards, 5:16.**

**Fourth quarter**

- PHI – Jake Elliott 31-yard field goal, 11:11. Eagles 37–23. **Drive: 14 plays, 61 yards, 5:52.**
- GB – Christian Watson 63-yard pass from Jordan Love (Mason Crosby kick), 9:00. Eagles 37–30. **Drive: 4 plays, 75 yards, 2:11.**
- PHI – Jake Elliott 54-yard field goal, 2:16. Eagles 40–30. **Drive: 10 plays, 43 yards, 6:44.**
- GB – Mason Crosby 33-yard field goal, 1:08. Eagles 40–33. **Drive: 7 plays, 38 yards, 1:08.**

**Top passers**

- GB – Aaron Rodgers – 11/16, 140 yards, 2 TD, 2 INT
- PHI – Jalen Hurts – 16/28, 153 yards, 2 TD

**Top rushers**

- GB – A. J. Dillon – 8 rushes, 64 yards, TD
- PHI – Jalen Hurts – 17 rushes, 157 yards

**Top receivers**

- GB – Christian Watson – 4 receptions, 110 yards, TD
- PHI – DeVonta Smith – 4 receptions, 50 yards

With the loss, the Packers fell to 4-8 and finished 1-3 against the NFC East.

==== Week 13: at Chicago Bears ====
Week 13: Green Bay Packers at Chicago Bears – Game summary

Quarter	1	2	3	4	Total
**Packers**	0	10	0	18	**28**
Bears	10	6	3	0	**19**

at Soldier Field, Chicago, Illinois

- Date: December 4
- Game time: 12:00 p.m. CST
- Game weather: Sunny, 34 °F (1 °C)
- Game attendance: 61,233
- Referee: Scott Novak
- TV announcers (Fox): Adam Amin, Mark Schlereth and Kristina Pink
- Recap, Game Book

Game information

**First quarter**

- CHI – Cairo Santos 40-yard field goal, 9:23. Bears 3–0. **Drive: 11 plays, 53 yards, 5:37.**
- CHI – Justin Fields 55-yard run (Cairo Santos kick), 3:00. Bears 10–0. **Drive: 5 plays, 70 yards, 2:39.**

**Second quarter**

- GB – Mason Crosby 24-yard field goal, 10:22. Bears 10–3. **Drive: 13 plays, 64 yards, 7:38.**
- CHI – David Montgomery 7-yard run (kick failed, wide right), 6:09. Bears 16–3. **Drive: 2 plays, 63 yards, 0:57.**
- GB – Christian Watson 14-yard pass from Aaron Rodgers (Mason Crosby kick), 0:17. Bears 16–10. **Drive: 13 plays, 75 yards, 5:52.**

**Third quarter**

- CHI – Cairo Santos 28-yard field goal, 1:50. Bears 19–10. **Drive: 12 plays, 62 yards, 8:01.**

**Fourth quarter**

- GB – A. J. Dillon 21-yard run (Mason Crosby kick), 14:41. Bears 19–17. **Drive: 4 plays, 82 yards, 2:09.**
- GB – Mason Crosby 32-yard field goal, 4:49. Packers 20–19. **Drive: 13 plays, 56 yards, 6:51.**
- GB – Christian Watson 46-yard run (Marcedes Lewis pass from Aaron Rodgers), 1:51. Packers 28–19. **Drive: 3 plays, 68 yards, 1:01.**

**Top passers**

- GB – Aaron Rodgers – 18/31, 182 yards, TD
- CHI – Justin Fields – 20/25, 254 yards, 2 INT

**Top rushers**

- GB – A. J. Dillon – 18 rushes, 93 yards, TD
- CHI – Justin Fields – 6 rushes, 71 yards, TD

**Top receivers**

- GB – Allen Lazard – 5 receptions, 67 yards
- CHI – Cole Kmet – 6 receptions, 72 yards

With the win, they improved to 5-8, and overtook the Bears for the most wins all-time in NFL history.

==== Week 15: vs. Los Angeles Rams ====
Week 15: Los Angeles Rams at Green Bay Packers – Game summary

Quarter	1	2	3	4	Total
Rams	0	6	6	0	**12**
**Packers**	3	7	14	0	**24**

at Lambeau Field, Green Bay, Wisconsin

- Date: December 19
- Game time: 7:20 p.m. CST
- Game weather: Cloudy, 15 °F (−9 °C)
- Game attendance: 77,269
- Referee: Shawn Hochuli
- TV announcers (ESPN): Joe Buck, Troy Aikman and Lisa Salters
- Recap, Game Book

Game information

**First quarter**

- GB – Mason Crosby 34-yard field goal, 4:25. Packers 3–0. **Drive: 12 plays, 52 yards, 6:14.**

**Second quarter**

- LAR – Matt Gray 33-yard field goal, 10:41. Tied 3–3. **Drive: 9 plays, 53 yards, 4:47.**
- GB – A. J. Dillon 8-yard run (Mason Crosby kick), 4:26. Packers 10–3. **Drive: 11 plays, 74 yards, 6:15.**
- LAR – Matt Gray 55-yard field goal, 0:46. Packers 10–6. **Drive: 10 plays, 28 yards, 3:40.**

**Third quarter**

- GB – A. J. Dillon 1-yard run (Mason Crosby kick), 8:04. Packers 17–6. **Drive: 11 plays, 68 yards, 6:56.**
- GB – Aaron Jones 7-yard pass from Aaron Rodgers (Mason Crosby kick), 2:31. Packers 24–6. **Drive: 6 plays, 35 yards, 3:02.**
- LAR – Tyler Higbee 8-yard pass from Baker Mayfield (kick failed, wide right), 0:22. Packers 24–12. **Drive: 6 plays, 70 yards, 2:09.**

**Fourth quarter**

- No scoring plays.

**Top passers**

- LAR – Baker Mayfield – 12/21, 111 yards, TD, INT
- GB – Aaron Rodgers – 22/30, 229 yards, TD, INT

**Top rushers**

- LAR – Cam Akers – 12 rushes, 65 yards
- GB – Aaron Jones – 17 rushes, 90 yards

**Top receivers**

- LAR – Cam Akers – 3 receptions, 35 yards
- GB – Romeo Doubs – 5 receptions, 55 yards

With the win, the Packers knocked the Rams out of playoff contention and they improved to 6-8 on the season.

==== Week 16: at Miami Dolphins ====
Christmas Day games

Week 16: Green Bay Packers at Miami Dolphins – Game summary

Quarter	1	2	3	4	Total
**Packers**	10	3	7	6	**26**
Dolphins	10	10	0	0	**20**

at Hard Rock Stadium, Miami Gardens, Florida

- Date: December 25
- Game time: 1:00 p.m. EST/12:00 p.m. CST
- Game weather: 46 °F (8 °C)
- Game attendance: 66,328
- Referee: Land Clark
- TV announcers (Fox): Joe Davis, Daryl Johnston and Pam Oliver
- Recap, Game Book

Game information

**First quarter**

- MIA – Jason Sanders 40-yard field goal, 11:10. Dolphins 3–0. **Drive: 8 plays, 52 yards, 3:50.**
- GB – Mason Crosby 36-yard field goal, 9:26. Tied 3–3. **Drive: 4 plays, 9 yards, 1:44.**
- MIA – Jaylen Waddle 84-yard pass from Tua Tagovailoa (Jason Sanders kick), 9:08. Dolphins 10–3. **Drive: 1 play, 84 yards, 0:18.**
- GB – Marcedes Lewis 1-yard pass from Aaron Rodgers (Mason Crosby kick), 4:10. Tied 10–10. **Drive: 10 plays, 54 yards, 4:58.**

**Second quarter**

- MIA – Jeff Wilson 1-yard run (Jason Sanders kick), 10:52. Dolphins 17–10. **Drive: 3 plays, 62 yards, 2:33.**
- MIA – Jason Sanders 34-yard field goal, 4:18. Dolphins 20–10. **Drive: 7 plays, 4 yards, 4:59.**
- GB – Mason Crosby 46-yard field goal, 0:02. Dolphins 20–13. **Drive: 8 plays, 21 yards, 1:53.**

**Third quarter**

- GB – A. J. Dillon 1-yard run (Mason Crosby kick), 7:53. Tied 20–20. **Drive: 11 plays, 78 yards, 7:07.**

**Fourth quarter**

- GB – Mason Crosby 28-yard field goal, 11:45. Packers 23–20. **Drive: 6 plays, 4 yards, 2:14.**
- GB – Mason Crosby 26-yard field goal, 2:02. Packers 26–20. **Drive: 9 plays, 56 yards, 4:00.**

**Top passers**

- GB – Aaron Rodgers – 24/38, 238 yards, TD, INT
- MIA – Tua Tagovailoa – 16/25, 310 yards, TD, 3 INT

**Top rushers**

- GB – A. J. Dillon – 11 rushes, 36 yards, TD
- MIA – Raheem Mostert – 8 rushes, 45 yards

**Top receivers**

- GB – Allen Lazard – 5 receptions, 61 yards
- MIA – Jaylen Waddle – 6 receptions, 143 yards, TD

With this win, they improved to 7-8 and finished 2-2 against the AFC East.

==== Week 17: vs. Minnesota Vikings ====
Week 17: Minnesota Vikings at Green Bay Packers – Game summary

Quarter	1	2	3	4	Total
Vikings	3	0	0	14	**17**
**Packers**	14	13	0	14	**41**

at Lambeau Field, Green Bay, Wisconsin

- Date: January 1
- Game time: 3:25 p.m. CST
- Game weather: Clear, 40 °F (4 °C)
- Game attendance: 78,190
- Referee: Carl Cheffers
- TV announcers (CBS): Jim Nantz, Tony Romo and Tracy Wolfson
- Recap, Game Book

Game information

**First quarter**

- MIN – Greg Joseph 21-yard field goal, 10:38. Vikings 3–0. **Drive: 4 plays, −1 yard, 1:12.**
- GB – Keisean Nixon 105-yard kickoff return (Mason Crosby kick), 10:25. Packers 7–3. **Drive: 0 plays, 0 yards, 0:13.**
- GB – Darnell Savage 75-yard interception return (Mason Crosby kick), 5:17. Packers 14–3.

**Second quarter**

- GB – Mason Crosby 26-yard field goal, 9:48. Packers 17–3. **Drive: 14 plays, 56 yards, 6:49.**
- GB – Robert Tonyan 21-yard pass from Aaron Rodgers (Mason Crosby kick), 2:41. Packers 24–3. **Drive: 5 plays, 60 yards, 3:11.**
- GB – Mason Crosby 56-yard field goal, 0:00. Packers 27–3. **Drive: 4 plays, 23 yards, 0:36.**

**Third quarter**

- No scoring plays.

**Fourth quarter**

- GB – A. J. Dillon 2-yard run (Mason Crosby kick), 14:54. Packers 34–3. **Drive: 12 plays, 76 yards, 7:12.**
- GB – Aaron Rodgers 2-yard run (Mason Crosby kick), 9:25. Packers 41–3. **Drive: 8 plays, 45 yards, 5:15.**
- MIN – Jalen Nailor 47-yard pass from Kirk Cousins (Greg Joseph kick), 7:36. Packers 41–10. **Drive: 4 plays, 59 yards, 1:49.**
- MIN – K. J. Osborn 9-yard pass from Nick Mullens (Greg Joseph kick), 0:21. Packers 41–17. **Drive: 8 plays, 79 yards, 3:37.**

**Top passers**

- MIN – Kirk Cousins – 18/31, 205 yards, TD, 3 INT
- GB – Aaron Rodgers – 15/24, 159 yards, TD

**Top rushers**

- MIN – Alexander Mattison – 8 rushes, 38 yards
- GB – Aaron Jones – 14 rushes, 111 yards

**Top receivers**

- MIN – Jalen Nailor – 3 receptions, 89 yards, TD
- GB – Allen Lazard – 5 receptions, 59 yards

In a rematch of the season opener, the Packers got their revenge on the Vikings by dominating them 41-17. This win helped them improve to 8-8. This would end up being Aaron Rodgers' final win in a Packers uniform.

==== Week 18: vs. Detroit Lions ====
Week 18: Detroit Lions at Green Bay Packers – Game summary

Quarter	1	2	3	4	Total
**Lions**	3	3	7	7	**20**
Packers	6	3	7	0	**16**

at Lambeau Field, Green Bay, Wisconsin

- Date: January 8
- Game time: 7:20 p.m. CST
- Game weather: Cloudy, 21 °F (−6 °C)
- Game attendance: 78,191
- Referee: Brad Rogers
- TV announcers (NBC): Mike Tirico, Cris Collinsworth and Melissa Stark
- Recap, Game Book

Game information

**First quarter**

- GB – Mason Crosby 22-yard field goal, 11:21. Packers 3–0. **Drive: 7 plays, 75 yards, 3:39.**
- DET – Michael Badgley 37-yard field goal, 7:00. Tied 3–3. **Drive: 5 plays, 12 yards, 1:32.**
- GB – Mason Crosby 49-yard field goal, 1:54. Packers 6–3. **Drive: 8 plays, 36 yards, 5:06.**

**Second quarter**

- GB – Mason Crosby 48-yard field goal, 12:56. Packers 9–3. **Drive: 7 plays, 25 yards, 2:21.**
- DET – Michael Badgley 33-yard field goal, 0:00. Packers 9–6. **Drive: 10 plays, 70 yards, 1:16.**

**Third quarter**

- DET – Jamaal Williams 1-yard run (Michael Badgley kick), 8:05. Lions 13–9. **Drive: 3 plays, 57 yards, 1:27.**
- GB – Allen Lazard 13-yard pass from Aaron Rodgers (Mason Crosby kick), 3:17. Packers 16–13. **Drive: 9 plays, 83 yards, 4:48.**

**Fourth quarter**

- DET – Jamaal Williams 1-yard run (Michael Badgley kick), 5:55. Lions 20–16. **Drive: 13 plays, 75 yards, 8:03.**

**Top passers**

- DET – Jared Goff – 23/34, 224 yards
- GB – Aaron Rodgers – 17/27, 205 yards, TD, INT

**Top rushers**

- DET – Jamaal Williams – 16 rushes, 72 yards, 2 TD
- GB – Aaron Jones – 12 rushes, 48 yards

**Top receivers**

- DET – Kalif Raymond – 4 receptions, 66 yards
- GB – Christian Watson – 5 receptions, 104 yards

With the devastating loss, the Packers were swept by the Lions for the first time since 2018 and finished the season 8-9, missing the playoffs and suffering their first losing season since 2018. This was Aaron Rodgers' last game with the Packers, as he was traded to the New York Jets in the offseason.

=== Standings ===
==== Division ====
NFC North
	W	L	T	PCT	DIV	CONF	PF	PA	STK
^{(3)} Minnesota Vikings	13	4	0	.765	4–2	8–4	424	427	W1
Detroit Lions	9	8	0	.529	5–1	7–5	453	427	W2
Green Bay Packers	8	9	0	.471	3–3	6–6	370	371	L1
Chicago Bears	3	14	0	.176	0–6	1–11	326	463	L10

==== Conference ====
NFC
#	Team	Division	W	L	T	PCT	DIV	CONF	SOS	SOV	STK
**Division leaders**
1	Philadelphia Eagles	East	14	3	0	.824	4–2	9–3	.474	.460	W1
2 (Note: San Francisco claimed the No. 2 seed over Minnesota based on conference record (10–2 vs. 8–4).)	San Francisco 49ers	West	13	4	0	.765	6–0	10–2	.417	.414	W10
3	Minnesota Vikings	North	13	4	0	.765	4–2	8–4	.474	.425	W1
4	Tampa Bay Buccaneers	South	8	9	0	.471	4–2	8–4	.503	.426	L1
**Wild cards**
5	Dallas Cowboys	East	12	5	0	.706	4–2	8–4	.507	.485	L1
6	New York Giants	East	9	7	1	.559	1–4–1	4–7–1	.526	.395	L1
7 (Note: Seattle finished ahead of Detroit based on head-to-head victory, claiming the 7th and final playoff spot.)	Seattle Seahawks	West	9	8	0	.529	4–2	6–6	.462	.382	W2
**Did not qualify for the postseason**
8	Detroit Lions	North	9	8	0	.529	5–1	7–5	.535	.451	W2
9	Washington Commanders	East	8	8	1	.500	2–3–1	5–6–1	.536	.449	W1
10	Green Bay Packers	North	8	9	0	.471	3–3	6–6	.524	.449	L1
11 (Note: Carolina finished ahead of New Orleans and Atlanta based on head-to-head record (3–1 vs. 2–2/1–3).)	Carolina Panthers	South	7	10	0	.412	4–2	6–6	.474	.437	W1
12 (Note: New Orleans finished ahead of Atlanta based on head-to-head sweep.)	New Orleans Saints	South	7	10	0	.412	2–4	5–7	.507	.462	L1
13	Atlanta Falcons	South	7	10	0	.412	2–4	6–6	.467	.429	W2
14	Los Angeles Rams	West	5	12	0	.294	1–5	3–9	.517	.341	L2
15	Arizona Cardinals	West	4	13	0	.235	1–5	3–9	.529	.368	L7
16	Chicago Bears	North	3	14	0	.176	0–6	1–11	.571	.480	L10
**Tiebreakers** (Note: When breaking ties for three or more teams under the NFL's rules, they are first broken within divisions, then comparing only the highest-ranked remaining team from each division.)

== Statistics ==
=== Starters ===
==== Regular season ====
Offense

Pos.	Name	GS
QB	Aaron Rodgers	17
RB	Aaron Jones	17
RB2	A. J. Dillon	3
WR	Allen Lazard; Sammy Watkins	15; 2
WR2	Christian Watson; Romeo Doubs; Sammy Watkins	9; 7; 1
WR3	Randall Cobb; Christian Watson; Samori Toure	3; 2; 2
TE	Marcedes Lewis	17
TE2	Robert Tonyan; Josiah Deguara	4; 3
LT	David Bakhtiari; Yosh Nijman; Zach Tom	11; 2; 4
LG	Elgton Jenkins; Jon Runyan Jr. Zach Tom	10; 6; 1
C	Josh Myers	17
RG	Jon Runyan Jr. Royce Newman; Jake Hanson	11; 5; 1
RT	Yosh Nijman; Elgton Jenkins; Royce Newman	11; 5; 1

Defense

Pos.	Name	GS
NT	Kenny Clark; T.J. Slaton	16; 1
DE	Dean Lowry; Kenny Clark; T.J. Slaton	12; 1; 1
DE	Jarran Reed	14
OLB	Preston Smith	17
OLB	Rashan Gary; Kingsley Enagbare	9; 7
ILB	De'Vondre Campbell; Isaiah McDuffie; Krys Barnes	13; 1; 1
ILB	Quay Walker	17
CB	Jaire Alexander; Keisean Nixon	16; 1
CB2	Eric Stokes; Rasul Douglas	9; 8
CB3	Rasul Douglas; Keisean Nixon; Darnell Savage	4; 3; 2
S	Adrian Amos	17
S2	Darnell Savage; Rudy Ford	11; 6
S3	Innis Gaines	1

=== Team leaders ===
Category	Player(s)	Value
Passing yards	Aaron Rodgers	3695
Passing touchdowns	Aaron Rodgers	26
Rushing yards	Aaron Jones	1121
Rushing touchdowns	A. J. Dillon	7
Receptions	Allen Lazard	60
Receiving yards	Allen Lazard	788
Receiving touchdowns	Christian Watson	7
Kickoff return yards	Keisean Nixon	1009
Punt return yards	Keisean Nixon	140
Tackles	Quay Walker	121
Sacks	Preston Smith	8.5
Interceptions	Jaire Alexander	5

=== League rankings ===
Category	Total yards	Yards per game	NFL rank (out of 32)
Passing offense	3,632	213.6	17th
Rushing offense	2,113	124.3	15th
Total offense	5745	337.9	17th
Passing defense	3,349	197.0	6th
Rushing defense	2,372	139.5	26th
Total defense	5,721	336.5	17th

Category	Total points	Points per game	NFL rank (out of 32)
Offensive points scored	370	21.8	14th
Defensive points allowed	371	21.8	17th

Statistical values after the end of the season

== Awards ==
Recipient	Award(s)
Jaire Alexander	Pro Bowler; All-Pro Team
Romeo Doubs	Week 3: NFL Rookie of the Week
Elgton Jenkins	Pro Bowler (alternate)
Aaron Jones	Week 2: FedEx Ground Player of the Week
Keisean Nixon	All-Pro Team
Pat O'Donnell	Week 3: NFC Special Teams Player of the Week
Christian Watson	Week 10: Rookie of the Week; November: Rookie of the Month
Keisean Nixon	Week 17: NFC Special Teams Player of the Week
