= Samori Toure =

Samori Toure may refer to:

- Samori Ture (1828–1900), Muslim cleric, military strategist, and founder and leader of the Wassoulou Empire
- Samori Toure (American football) (born 1998), American football wide receiver
