= Micah Abernathy =

American football player (born 1997)

Profile
- Position: Safety

Personal information
- Born: February 10, 1997 (age 29); Atlanta, Georgia, U.S.
- Listed height: 6 ft 0 in (1.83 m)
- Listed weight: 195 lb (88 kg)

Career information
- High school: Greater Atlanta Christian School (Norcross, Georgia)
- College: Tennessee (2015–2018)
- NFL draft: 2019: undrafted

Career history
- Minnesota Vikings (2019)*; Tampa Bay Buccaneers (2019)*; Indianapolis Colts (2019)*; Dallas Renegades (2020); Houston Gamblers (2022); Green Bay Packers (2022); Atlanta Falcons (2022–2024)
- * Offseason or practice squad member only

Career NFL statistics as of 2024
- Total tackles: 11
- Stats at Pro Football Reference

Micah Alexander Abernathy (born February 10, 1997) is an American professional football safety. He played college football for the Tennessee Volunteers, and originally signed with the Minnesota Vikings as an undrafted free agent in 2019. He has also been a member of the Tampa Bay Buccaneers, Indianapolis Colts, and Green Bay Packers of the NFL, the Dallas Renegades of the XFL, and the Houston Gamblers of the United States Football League (USFL).

== Early life ==
Micah Abernathy was born on February 10, 1997. He was a four-star recruit of the Class of 2015, as the 233rd prospect and the 25th best cornerback prospect nationally on 247Sports. He committed to the University of Tennessee on October 10, 2014. Abernathy attended Westminster up until middle school, where his older brother and future Tennessee teammate, Ralph David Abernathy IV, was a standout runningback. Micah eventually transferred to Greater Atlanta Christian for high school. His grandfather is the 20th-century civil rights activist, Ralph Abernathy.

== College career ==
Abernathy played at the University of Tennessee from 2015 to 2018 under head coaches Butch Jones and Jeremy Pruitt.

During his freshman year, he played in all 12 games, playing the nickel position and kick returner. He switched to safety in 2016, starting 10 games for the Volunteers. He tied the team lead for interceptions (2) and passes defended (6), ranked second in tackles (69) and led the team in fumbles recovered (3). In 2017, he started all 12 games at safety and ranked third on the team in tackles (81) but had no interceptions and only 2 passes defensed. The following year, in his final season, he started 8 games at safety, missing 4 with an injury, and again recording no interceptions (and only 1 pass defensed).

== Professional career ==
=== Pre-draft ===
Pre-draft measurables
| Height | Weight | Arm length | Hand span | 40-yard dash | 10-yard split | 20-yard split | 20-yard shuttle | Three-cone drill | Vertical jump | Broad jump | Bench press |
|---|---|---|---|---|---|---|---|---|---|---|---|
| 5 ft 11 5/8 in (1.82 m) | 195 lb (88 kg) | 31 in (0.79 m) | 9 3/8 in (0.24 m) | 4.45 s | 1.59 s | 2.59 s | 4.09 s | 6.60 s | 38.5 in (0.98 m) | 10 ft 10 in (3.30 m) | 15 reps |
All values from Pro Day

Abernathy was graded by NFL analyst Lance Zierlein as a "priority free agent" prior to the draft, remarking that he had the requisite size, speed and athleticism across multiple secondary positions, but noted that he lacked awareness, instincts, and tackling ability expected.

=== Minnesota Vikings ===
After going undrafted in the 2019 NFL draft, Abernathy signed as an undrafted free agent for the Minnesota Vikings. Abernathy was released by the Vikings on July 24, 2019.

=== Tampa Bay Buccaneers ===
On August 11, 2019, Abernathy signed with the Tampa Bay Buccaneers. The Buccaneers waived Abernathy on August 14, 2019.

=== Indianapolis Colts ===
On August 26, 2019, the Indianapolis Colts signed Abernathy. He was released on August 31, 2019.

=== Dallas Renegades ===
Abernathy played for the Dallas Renegades of the XFL during the 2020 season.

=== Houston Gamblers ===
Abernathy played for the Houston Gamblers of the United States Football League during the 2022 season.

=== Green Bay Packers ===
On August 10, 2022, the Green Bay Packers signed Abernathy following injuries to safeties Darnell Savage, Vernon Scott and Dallin Leavitt. Abernathy played well in his first pre-season appearance against the New Orleans Saints, recording an interception and a tackle for loss on a screen pass. He was named to the 53-man roster by the Packers on August 30, 2022, as the fifth safety on the depth chart. On August 31, 2022, he was released. He was signed to the practice squad two days later. He was elevated from the practice squad to the active roster and made his NFL debut in week one of the regular season, playing on six special teams snaps in the 7–23 loss to the Vikings. On December 3, 2022, he was once again elevated for gameday.

=== Atlanta Falcons ===
On December 31, 2022, Abernathy was signed by the Atlanta Falcons off the Packers practice squad. He was waived on August 29, 2023, and re-signed to the practice squad. The Falcons signed him to their active roster on October 18, 2023. On October 15, 2024, the Falcons placed him on injured reserve as he sustained a knee injury during the first quarter of their game against the Carolina Panthers.

== NFL career statistics ==
=== Regular season ===
| Year | Team | Games | | Tackles | | | | Interceptions | | | | | | Fumbles | |
| Year | Team | GP | GS | Comb | Total | Ast | Sck | PD | Int | Yds | Avg | Lng | TDs | FF | FR |
|---|---|---|---|---|---|---|---|---|---|---|---|---|---|---|---|
| 2022 | GB | 2 | 0 | 1 | 0 | 1 | 0.0 | 0 | 0 | 0 | 0 | 0 | 0 | 0 | 0 |
| Career | | 2 | 0 | 1 | 0 | 1 | 0.0 | 0 | 0 | 0 | 0.0 | 0 | 0 | 0 | 0 |
