= Patrick Taylor (American football) =

American football player (born 1998)

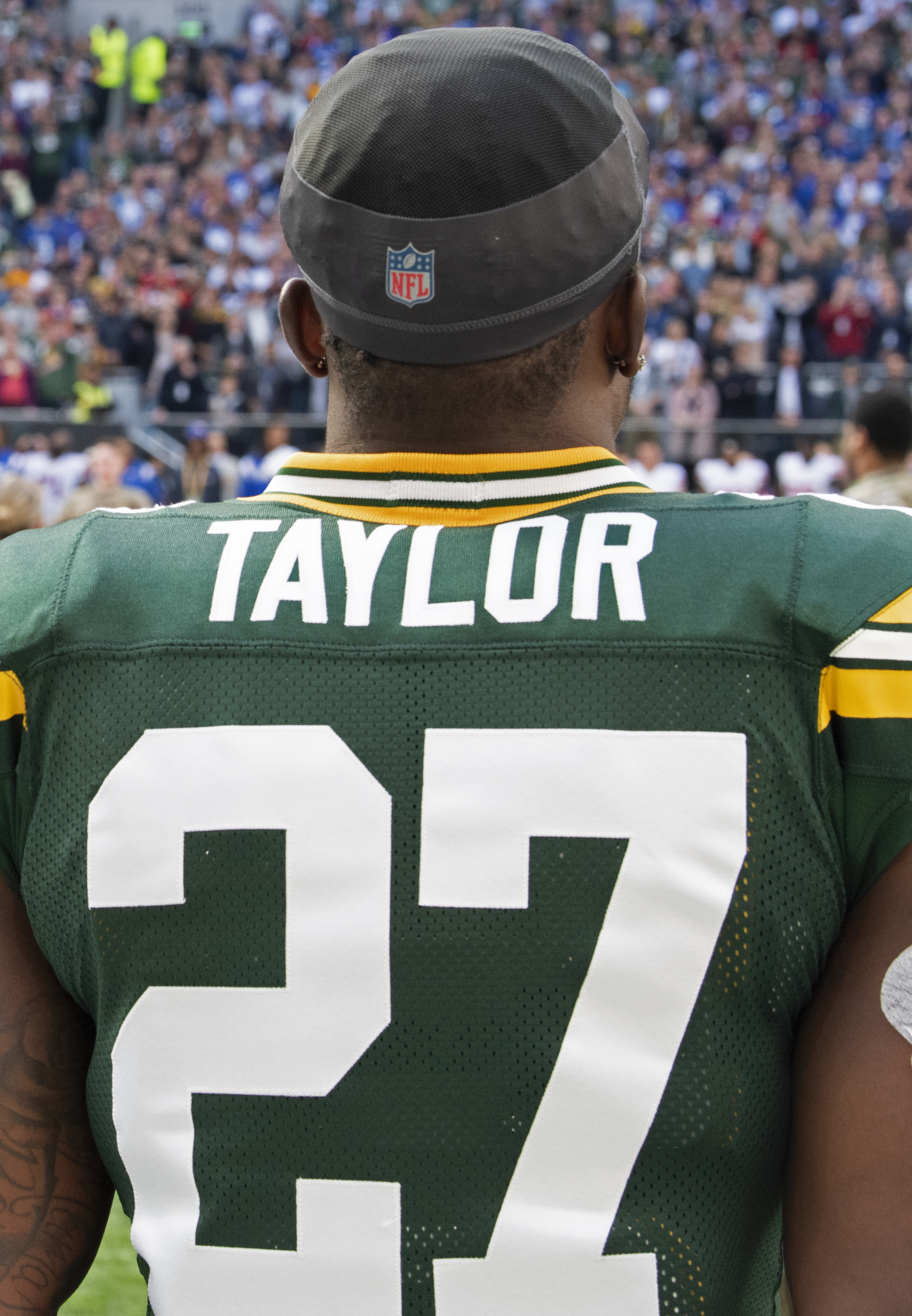
- Taylor with the Green Bay Packers in 2022

Profile
- Position: Running back

Personal information
- Born: April 29, 1998 (age 28); Humble, Texas, U.S.
- Listed height: 6 ft 2 in (1.88 m)
- Listed weight: 217 lb (98 kg)

Career information
- High school: Atascocita (Harris County, Texas)
- College: Memphis (2016–2019)
- NFL draft: 2020: undrafted

Career history
- Green Bay Packers (2020–2023); New England Patriots (2023)*; Green Bay Packers (2023); San Francisco 49ers (2024–2025)
- * Offseason or practice squad member only

Career NFL statistics as of 2025
- Rushing yards: 444
- Rushing average: 4.3
- Rushing touchdowns: 2
- Receptions: 17
- Receiving yards: 94
- Stats at Pro Football Reference

Patrick O'Neal Taylor Jr. (born April 29, 1998) is an American professional football running back. He played college football for the Memphis Tigers.

== College career ==
As a true freshman, Taylor was the Tigers' second-leading rusher with 546 yards on 93 carries and two touchdowns. He was Memphis' second-leading rusher again as a sophomore after rushing 157 times for 866 yards and a team-high 13 touchdowns while also catching 19 passes for 148 yards and one touchdown. Taylor rushed for 1,122 yards and 16 touchdowns as a junior. Taylor missed half of his senior season due to a foot injury and finished the year with 350 rushing yards and five touchdowns.

== Professional career ==
Pre-draft measurables
Height	Weight	Arm length	Hand span	Wingspan	40-yard dash	10-yard split	20-yard split	20-yard shuttle	Vertical jump	Broad jump	Bench press
6 ft 1 1/2 in (1.87 m)	217 lb (98 kg)	32 1/4 in (0.82 m)	9 3/8 in (0.24 m)	6 ft 3 5/8 in (1.92 m)	4.57 s	1.54 s	2.69 s	4.34 s	34.0 in (0.86 m)	10 ft 3 in (3.12 m)	15 reps
All values from NFL Combine

=== Green Bay Packers (first stint) ===
Taylor signed with the Green Bay Packers as an undrafted free agent on April 29, 2020, shortly after the conclusion of the 2020 NFL draft. He was placed on the active/non-football injury list at the start of training camp on July 31. Taylor was moved to the reserve/non-football injury list at the start of the regular season on September 5. He began practicing with the team on December 17, but the team did not activate him at the end of his 21-day practice window.

On August 31, 2021, Packers released Taylor as part of their final roster cuts. He was signed to the practice squad the next day. On November 4, Taylor was promoted to the active roster. He got his first career touchdown in a game against the Detroit Lions in week 18.

Taylor was waived on August 30, 2022, and signed to the practice squad the next day. Taylor was elevated from the practice squad to the active roster on September 17. Taylor was promoted from the practice squad to the active roster on September 24. On November 1, he was released by the Packers, and subsequently re-signed to the practice squad two days later. On November 15, Taylor was promoted back to the active roster. He was released once more on November 23. On November 25, Taylor was re-signed to the practice squad and elevated to the active roster a day later. On December 3, he was once again elevated for gameday. He was signed back to the active roster on December 19.

Taylor was released again on August 29, 2023. A day later, he was signed to the Packers' practice squad. He was elevated to the active roster for the first three weeks of the 2023 season. On October 9, he was signed to the active roster. Taylor was released a day later.

=== New England Patriots ===
On October 18, 2023, the New England Patriots signed Taylor to their practice squad.

=== Green Bay Packers (second stint) ===
On November 20, 2023, the Packers signed Taylor off of the Patriots' practice squad.

=== San Francisco 49ers ===
On April 8, 2024, Taylor signed with the San Francisco 49ers. On November 8, Taylor was waived by the 49ers, and re-signed to the practice squad. On December 4, he was promoted to the active roster. Taylor made his first career start in Week 16 against the Miami Dolphins, rushing 8 times for 24 yards.

On March 21, 2025, Taylor re-signed with the 49ers on a one-year contract. On August 19, Taylor was placed on injured reserve.

On March 24, 2026, Taylor re-signed with the 49ers on a one-year contract. On August 20, Taylor was placed on injured reserve due to an adductor injury and released eight days later.

== NFL career statistics ==
=== Regular season ===
Year	Team	Games		Rushing					Receiving					Fumbles	
Year	Team	GP	GS	Att	Yds	Avg	Lng	TD	Rec	Yds	Avg	Lng	TD	Fum	Lost
2021	GB	9	0	23	89	3.9	12	1	2	3	1.5	3	0	0	0
2022	GB	14	0	10	31	3.1	6	0	1	17	17.0	17	0	0	0
2023	GB	11	0	32	141	4.4	24	0	11	49	4.5	16	0	0	0
2024	SF	12	1	22	74	3.4	9	1	2	13	6.5	12	0	0	0
Total		46	1	87	335	3.9	24	2	16	82	5.1	17	0	0	0
Source: pro-football-reference.com

=== Postseason ===
Year	Team	Games		Rushing					Receiving					Fumbles	
Year	Team	GP	GS	Att	Yds	Avg	Lng	TD	Rec	Yds	Avg	Lng	TD	Fum	Lost
2021	GB	1	0	0	0	0	0	0	0	0	0	0	0	0	0
2023	GB	2	0	3	6	2.0	3	0	0	0	0	0	0	0	0
Total		3	0	3	6	2.0	3	0	0	0	0	0	0	0	0
Source: pro-football-reference.com
