= Innis Gaines =

American football player (born 1998)

No. 38
- Position: Cornerback

Personal information
- Born: August 29, 1998 (age 28); Beaumont, Texas, U.S.
- Listed height: 6 ft 1 in (1.85 m)
- Listed weight: 202 lb (92 kg)

Career information
- High school: West Brook (Beaumont)
- College: TCU (2016–2019)
- NFL draft: 2020: undrafted

Career history
- Green Bay Packers (2021–2023)

Career NFL statistics as of 2023
- Total tackles: 11
- Stats at Pro Football Reference

Innis Gaines (born August 29, 1998) is an American former professional football player who was a cornerback for the Green Bay Packers of the National Football League (NFL). He played college football for the TCU Horned Frogs and was signed by the Packers as an undrafted free agent in 2021.

== Early life and college ==
Gaines was born on August 29, 1998, in Beaumont, Texas. He attended West Brook High School in Beaumont, recording 124 tackles, five interceptions, and two fumble recoveries as a senior. He was a four-star safety according to 247Sports.com and was ranked as the number four safety in the state of Texas. He committed to TCU over offers from Texas A&M and Arkansas.

As a freshman in 2016, he appeared in ten games and made two tackles. As a sophomore, Gaines appeared in all 14 games, making two starts. He finished the year with 37 tackles, 6-for-loss, and 2 quarterback sacks. As a junior, Gaines started the first six games of the year before going out with an injury. He totaled 31 tackles in the year. Following the 2018 season, he was named second-team all-Big 12 Conference by Pro Football Focus. As a senior, he started the first eight games before again being sidelined due to injury. He made a total of 34 tackles in the year, placing seventh on the team.

== Professional career ==
Pre-draft measurables
Height	Weight
6 ft 0 5/8 in (1.84 m)	203 lb (92 kg)
Values from Pro Day

Gaines went unselected in the 2020 NFL draft, and only received one tryout due to COVID-19 restrictions. While a free agent, he worked for DoorDash. The Green Bay Packers, who held the tryout, gave him a futures contract on January 8, 2021. Gaines was released at the final roster cuts in August 2021 but re-signed to the practice squad the next day. He was activated from the practice squad to the active roster for their game against the Cleveland Browns, and made his NFL debut in the 24–22 win, making one tackle.

On January 25, 2022, Gaines signed a reserve/future contract with the Packers. He was waived/injured on August 30, and placed on injured reserve. He was released on September 9. On October 11, Gaines received a tryout from the New York Jets. He was signed again by the Packers on October 18 to the practice squad and was elevated to the active roster on October 29. On November 26, Gaines was elevated to the active roster from the practice squad. On November 29, the Packers signed Gaines to their active roster.

Gaines was released on August 29, 2023, and re-signed to the practice squad. He was elevated for Weeks 1 and 2 of the 2023 season. The same was done in Week 9. He was signed to the active roster on November 11, but waived two days later.

== NFL career statistics ==
=== Regular season ===
Year	Team	Games		Tackles					Interceptions						Fumbles	
Year	Team	GP	GS	Cmb	Solo	Ast	Sck	Sfty	PD	Int	Yds	Avg	Lng	TD	FF	FR
2021	GB	1	0	1	0	1	0.0	0	0	0	0	0	0	0	0	0
2022	GB	7	1	6	5	1	0.0	0	0	0	0	0	0	0	0	0
2023	GB	4	0	4	3	1	0.0	0	0	0	0	0	0	0	0	0
Career		12	1	11	8	3	0	0	0	0	0	0	0	0	0	0
Source: pro-football-reference.com
