= Yosh Nijman =

American football player (born 1995)

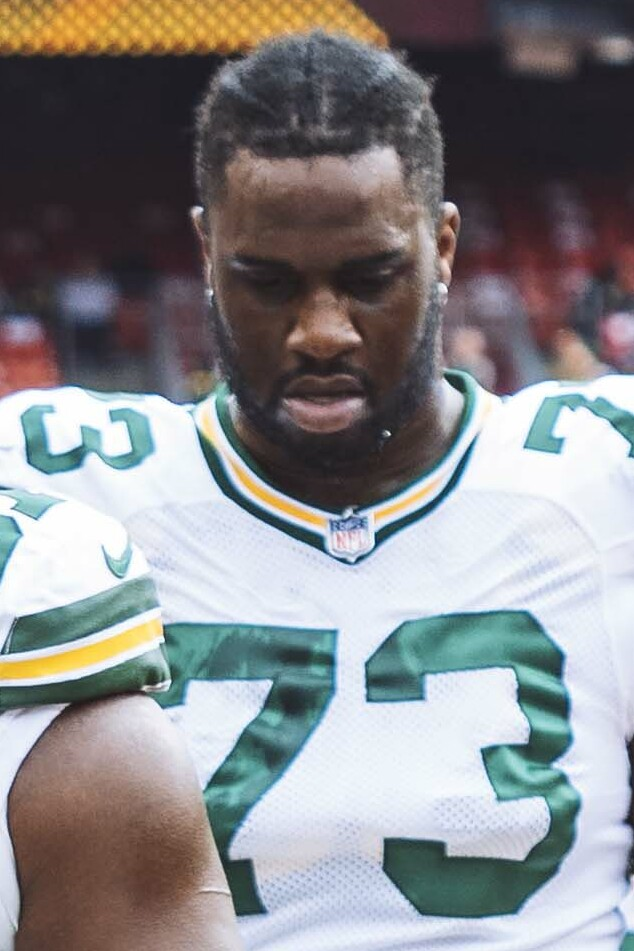
- Nijman with the Green Bay Packers in 2022

No. 73, 77
- Position: Offensive tackle

Personal information
- Born: January 2, 1996 (age 30); Orange, New Jersey, U.S.
- Listed height: 6 ft 7 in (2.01 m)
- Listed weight: 314 lb (142 kg)

Career information
- High school: Columbia (Maplewood, New Jersey)
- College: Virginia Tech (2014–2018)
- NFL draft: 2019: undrafted

Career history
- Green Bay Packers (2019–2023); Carolina Panthers (2024–2025)

Career NFL statistics
- Games played: 99
- Games started: 29
- Stats at Pro Football Reference

Yosuah Hesdy Nijman (born January 2, 1996) is an American former professional football player who was an offensive tackle for seven seasons in the National Football League (NFL). He played college football for the Virginia Tech Hokies. Nijman was signed by the Green Bay Packers as an undrafted free agent in 2019. He also played for the Carolina Panthers.

== Early life ==
Born in Orange, New Jersey to Surinamese parents, Nijman was raised in nearby Maplewood and played prep football at Columbia High School. While at Columbia High School, Nijman played as an offensive tackle for the Columbia Cougars. Nijman later played one semester as a strongside defensive end with the Blue Devils while at Fork Union Military Academy, graduating in 2015. Rated as a four-star recruiting prospect by Rivals.com and 247Sports, Nijman received offers from Temple, Miami and Virginia.

== College career ==
The connections between Fork Union and Virginia Tech influenced Nijman to commit to VT as early as 2014. Despite earlier promises of playing as a defensive lineman for the Hokies, reconsiderations assigned him to play on the offensive line. During his freshman season in 2014, Nijman played in 12 games as a reservist. In his sophomore season in 2015, Nijman played in all 14 games as a starting left tackle. During his junior season in 2016, Nijman would only play 9 out of 14 games, missing the last 5 games due to injury. He returned to play his senior season as a left tackle, allowing room to assign Christian Darrisaw to right tackle. Another season-shortening injury caused Nijman to miss the team's final three games. After the 2018 season, Nijman entered the 2019 NFL draft.

== Professional career ==
Pre-draft measurables
Height	Weight	Arm length	Hand span	Wingspan	40-yard dash	10-yard split	20-yard split	20-yard shuttle	Three-cone drill	Vertical jump	Broad jump	Bench press
6 ft 6 7/8 in (2.00 m)	324 lb (147 kg)	34 in (0.86 m)	10 in (0.25 m)	6 ft 9 1/2 in (2.07 m)	4.88 s	1.71 s	2.84 s	4.50 s	7.29 s	30.5 in (0.77 m)	9 ft 6 in (2.90 m)	27 reps
All values from NFL Combine/Pro Day

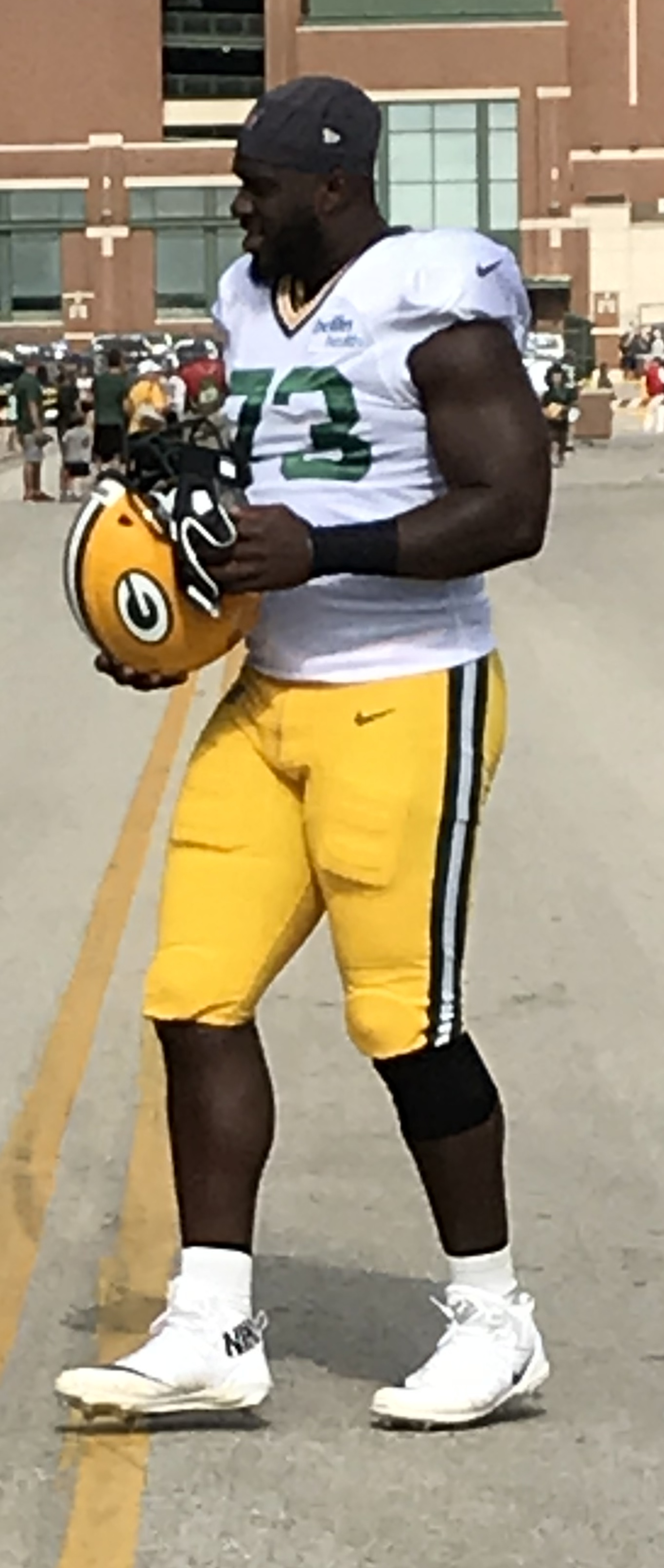
Nijman at Packers training camp in 2019.

=== Green Bay Packers ===
After playing four years at Virginia Tech, Nijman was signed by the Green Bay Packers as an undrafted free agent on May 3, 2019. He was waived on August 31 and was signed to the practice squad the next day. On November 26, he was promoted to the active roster; however, on December 21, he was placed on injured reserve after suffering an elbow injury that would keep him out for the rest of the season.

Nijman made the Packers' 53-man roster in 2020, playing mostly on special teams. He signed an exclusive-rights free agent tender with the Packers on May 6, 2021.

Nijman was named the Packers' third-string left tackle to begin the 2021 season, behind David Bakhtiari and Elgton Jenkins. After Jenkins injured his ankle in a Week 2 victory over the Detroit Lions, and with Bakhtiari still rehabilitating a torn ACL suffered during the 2020 season, Nijman made his first career start in a Week 3 victory over the San Francisco 49ers. With Jenkins remaining out, Nijman retained the starting job for a Week 4 win against the Pittsburgh Steelers and a Week 5 win against the Cincinnati Bengals before Jenkins finally returned for a Week 6 win against the Chicago Bears.

Nijman was dubbed the "World's Biggest Robot" by teammate, quarterback Aaron Rodgers, after doing "The Robot" dance during a touchdown celebration. Rodgers praised Nijman for his play, stating that he "almost forgot about that side of the line", implying he trusted Nijman to protect his blindside.

During the Packers' Week 11 game against the Minnesota Vikings, Jenkins suffered a season-ending knee injury. Nijman again stepped in during the game and remained the Packers' starting left tackle for the next several weeks. He missed several snaps during their Week 15 matchup with the Cleveland Browns, being replaced by fourth-string tackle Ben Braden, but returned later during the game. On January 9 against the Detroit Lions, the Packers named five-time All-Pro David Bakhtiari the starter for the game after he missed nearly the entire regular-season with a knee injury sustained the previous year. Bakhtiari played most of the first half, but exited the game from fatigue and Nijman replaced him for the remainder of the game. He signed his tender offer from the Packers on April 18, 2022, to keep him with the team. In Week 7, Nijman was named the starting right tackle in place of Elgton Jenkins, who was moved from right tackle to left guard.

Entering the 2023 offseason as a restricted free agent, the Packers placed a second round tender on Nijman on March 15, 2023.

=== Carolina Panthers ===
On March 18, 2024, Nijman signed a two-year contract with the Carolina Panthers. Across his two years with the team, Nijman recorded 32 appearances (including seven starts).

On March 11, 2026, Nijman announced his retirement from professional football.
