= Keisean Nixon =

American football player (born 1997)

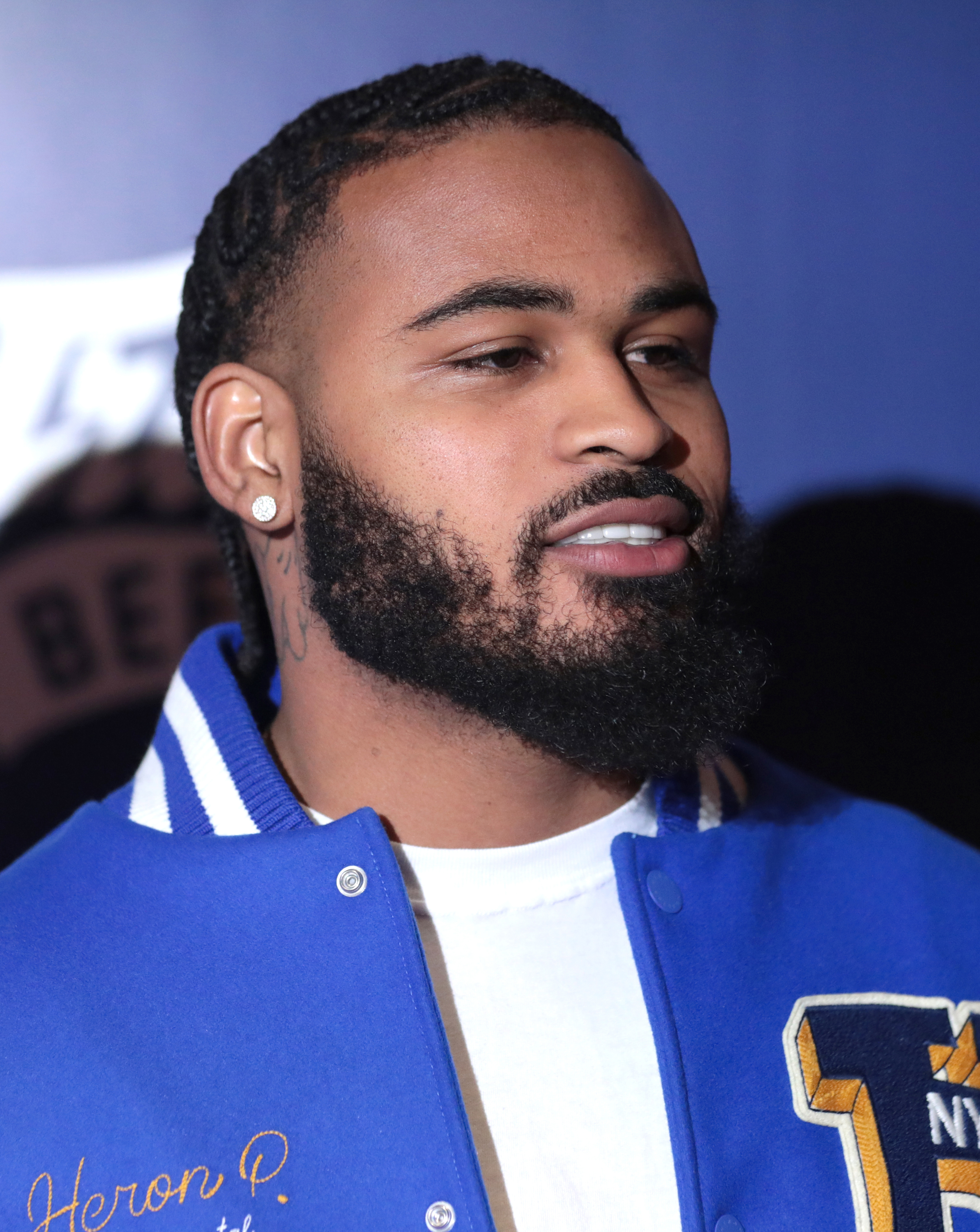
- Nixon in 2023

No. 25 – Green Bay Packers
- Position: Cornerback
- Roster status: Active

Personal information
- Born: June 22, 1997 (age 29); Los Angeles, California, U.S.
- Listed height: 5 ft 10 in (1.78 m)
- Listed weight: 200 lb (91 kg)

Career information
- High school: Salesian (Los Angeles)
- College: Arizona Western (2015–2016); South Carolina (2017–2018)
- NFL draft: 2019: undrafted

Career history
- Oakland / Las Vegas Raiders (2019–2021); Green Bay Packers (2022–present)

Awards and highlights
- Pro Bowl (2025); 2× First-team All-Pro (2022, 2023) (Note: Selected as a kick returner); 2× NFL kickoff return yards leader (2022, 2023)

Career NFL statistics as of Week 10, 2026
- Total tackles: 355
- Sacks: 4.0
- Forced fumbles: 4
- Fumble recoveries: 3
- Pass deflections: 41
- Interceptions: 5
- Return yards: 2,689
- Return touchdowns: 1
- Stats at Pro Football Reference

Keisean Nixon (born June 22, 1997) is an American professional football cornerback for the Green Bay Packers of the National Football League (NFL). He played college football at Arizona Western before transferring to South Carolina, and was signed by the Oakland Raiders as an undrafted free agent in 2019.

== Early life ==
Nixon grew up in Compton, California and attended Salesian High School in Los Angeles, where he ran track and played running back and cornerback on the football team. He missed a large portion of his senior season due to a broken collarbone.

== College career ==
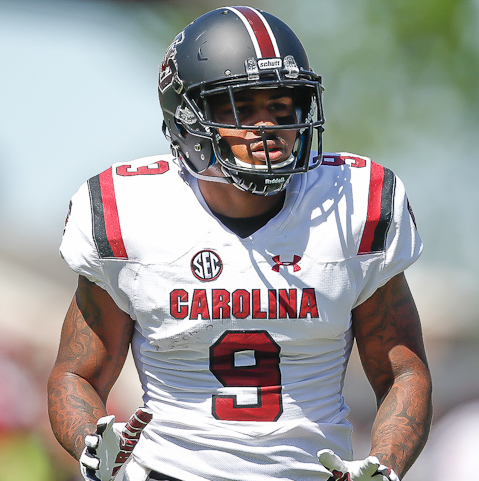
Nixon in playing for South Carolina in 2018

Nixon began his collegiate career at Arizona Western College. As a freshman, he made 36 tackles with five interceptions and four pass breakups and was named a second-team All-NJCAA All-American as a sophomore after intercepting six passes (two returned for touchdowns) with five pass breakups and two kicks returned for touchdowns. Nixon transferred to the University of South Carolina for the final two years of his NCAA eligibility.

Nixon played mostly on special teams and as a reserve defensive back in his first season at South Carolina, playing in all 12 of the Gamecocks games with a fumble recovery and an interception. As a senior, Nixon started 11 games and led the team with nine passes broken up and finished third with 63 tackles.

== Professional career ==
Pre-draft measurables
Height	Weight	Arm length	Hand span	Wingspan	40-yard dash	10-yard split	20-yard split	20-yard shuttle	Three-cone drill	Vertical jump	Broad jump	Bench press
5 ft 10 1/4 in (1.78 m)	196 lb (89 kg)	30 3/4 in (0.78 m)	9 3/4 in (0.25 m)	6 ft 2 1/8 in (1.88 m)	4.42 s	1.56 s	2.60 s	4.52 s	7.28 s	32.5 in (0.83 m)	10 ft 0 in (3.05 m)	10 reps
All values from Pro Day

=== Oakland / Las Vegas Raiders ===
Nixon signed with the Oakland Raiders as an undrafted free agent on April 27, 2019. He made his NFL debut on September 9, 2019, against the Denver Broncos. Nixon finished his rookie season with 12 tackles, one pass defended and three kickoffs returned for 63 yards in 14 games played.

On September 2, 2021, Nixon was placed on injured reserve. He was activated on October 9.

=== Green Bay Packers ===
==== 2022 ====
Nixon signed with the Green Bay Packers on March 26, 2022.

On September 25, 2022, in his second game on the active roster for the Packers, Nixon recorded seven combined tackles and one forced fumble in a Week 3 victory over the Tampa Bay Buccaneers.

Though Nixon saw defensive snaps throughout the 2022 season, the Packers began to utilize him more often as a return specialist in October. Beginning on October 16 during a Week 6 loss to the New York Jets, Nixon returned 35 kickoffs for 1,009 yards (with five returns of 50 yards or more), the only player in the NFL to record more than 1,000 yards that year. On January 1, 2023, Nixon returned a kickoff 105 yards for his first NFL touchdown against the Minnesota Vikings, swinging the game's momentum in the Packers' favor and propelling them to a 41–17 victory that kept their playoff hopes alive. He was named NFC Special Teams Player of the Week for his performance. Nixon finished the season as the NFL's leading kick returner, and was named a first-team member of the 2022 All-Pro Team at that position, receiving 44 out of 50 first-place votes.

==== 2023 ====
On March 15, 2023, Nixon re-signed with the Packers on a 1-year $4 million contract.

Packers head coach Matt LaFleur told reporters during the offseason that he was exploring ways to utilize Nixon on the offensive side of the ball. Nixon worked through some individual drills with the offense during training camp; he finally saw his first action as an offensive player on September 24, 2023, during a Week 3 win over the New Orleans Saints, recording one carry for 11 yards. Nixon got his second career interception when he picked off Patrick Mahomes during a 27–19 victory over the Kansas City Chiefs in Week 13. He was named to the 2023 All-Pro Team. In the Wild Card playoffs against the Dallas Cowboys, Nixon led the team with 11 combined tackles while getting his first career sack on a Dak Prescott scramble, which knocked the Cowboys out of field goal range. The following week against the San Francisco 49ers, Nixon had 5 combined tackles on defense. He also returned one of San Francisco's kickoffs for 73 yards midway through the third quarter, but fumbled the football. It was ultimately recovered by teammate Eric Wilson. The Packers lost the game 24–21.

==== 2024 ====
Nixon signed a 3-year, $18 million contract extension on March 15, 2024, keeping him in Green Bay through the 2026 season. On March 26, the NFL announced that kickoffs during the 2024 season would be modified in a trial for new, safer kickoff rules that may also allow for more exciting kickoff returns. However, the new kickoff rules increased the number of touchbacks, and Nixon went from having 30 kick returns during the 2023 season to just 18 in 2024.

In the Wild Card playoffs against the Philadelphia Eagles, Nixon was ruled to have fumbled the opening kickoff in a 22–10 loss despite him recovering the football prior to a scrum.

==== 2025 ====
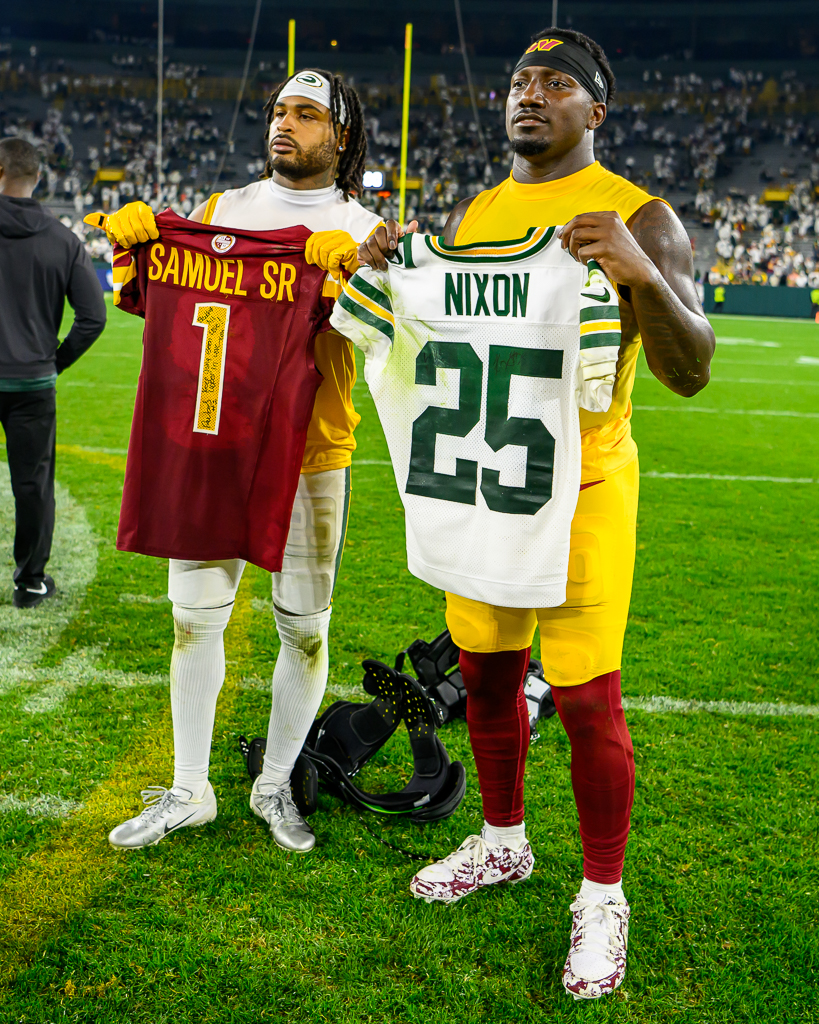
Nixon swapping jerseys with Washington Commanders wide receiver, Deebo Samuel, in 2025

On June 9, 2025, the Packers released top cornerback Jaire Alexander, and Nixon was named one of the team's top two cornerbacks to start the season. During a Week 2 win over the Washington Commanders, Nixon recorded five pass breakups, the most by a Packer in a single game since 2018.

== NFL career statistics ==
Legend
	Led the league
**Bold**	Career-high

=== Regular season ===
Year	Team	Games		Tackles					Interceptions						Kick returns					Fumbles				
Year	Team	GP	GS	Cmb	Solo	Ast	TFL	Sck	PD	Int	Yds	Avg	Lng	TD	Ret	Yds	Avg	Lng	TD	FF	Fmb	FR	Yds	TD
2019	OAK	14	0	12	12	0	0	0.0	1	0	0	0.0	0	0	3	63	21.0	26	0	0	0	0	0	0
2020	LV	15	1	14	9	5	0	0.0	0	0	0	0.0	0	0	3	21	7.0	18	0	0	2	0	0	0
2021	LV	11	1	12	7	5	0	0.0	0	0	0	0.0	0	0	0	0	0.0	0	0	0	0	0	0	0
2022	GB	17	4	23	18	5	1	0.0	2	**1**	1	1.0	1	0	**35**	**1,009**	28.8	**105**	**1**	1	0	0	0	0
2023	GB	17	13	80	59	21	3	0.5	6	**1**	2	2.0	2	0	30	782	26.1	51	0	0	**3**	**2**	0	0
2024	GB	17	15	**88**	**61**	**27**	**8**	**3.0**	7	**1**	**16**	**16.0**	**16**	0	18	528	**29.3**	43	0	**3**	0	0	0	0
2025	GB	17	17	72	58	14	3	0.0	**17**	**1**	0	0.0	0	0	0	0	0.0	0	0	0	1	1	**22**	0
2026	GB	10	10	54	39	15	5	0.5	8	**1**	11	11.0	11	0	0	0	0.0	0	0	0	0	0	0	0
Career		118	61	355	263	92	20	4.0	41	5	30	4.8	16	0	89	2,403	27.0	105T	1	4	6	3	22	0
Source: pro-football-reference.com

=== Postseason ===
Year	Team	Games		Tackles					Interceptions						Kick returns					Fumbles				
Year	Team	GP	GS	Cmb	Solo	Ast	TFL	Sck	PD	Int	Yds	Avg	Lng	TD	Ret	Yds	Avg	Lng	TD	FF	Fmb	FR	Yds	TD
2021	LV	1	0	2	0	2	0	0.0	0	0	0	0.0	0	0	0	0	0.0	0	0	0	0	0	0	0
2023	GB	2	1	**16**	**10**	**6**	**1**	**1.0**	**2**	0	0	0.0	0	0	2	**97**	**48.5**	**73**	0	0	**1**	0	0	0
2024	GB	1	0	2	1	1	0	0.0	0	0	0	0.0	0	0	**4**	95	23.8	28	0	0	**1**	0	0	0
2025	GB	1	1	6	4	2	0	0.0	0	0	0	0.0	0	0	3	69	23.0	28	0	0	0	0	0	0
Career		5	2	26	15	11	1	1.0	2	0	0	0.0	0	0	9	261	29.0	73	0	0	2	0	0	0
Source: pro-football-reference.com

== Personal life ==
Throughout the first four years of Nixon's NFL career, rumors persisted that he was the nephew of rapper Snoop Dogg. However, Nixon told the Milwaukee Journal Sentinel in 2022 that, while he did play in Snoop's nonprofit Snoop Youth Football League (SYFL) in high school, they are not actually related.
