= Dallin Leavitt =

American football player (born 1994)

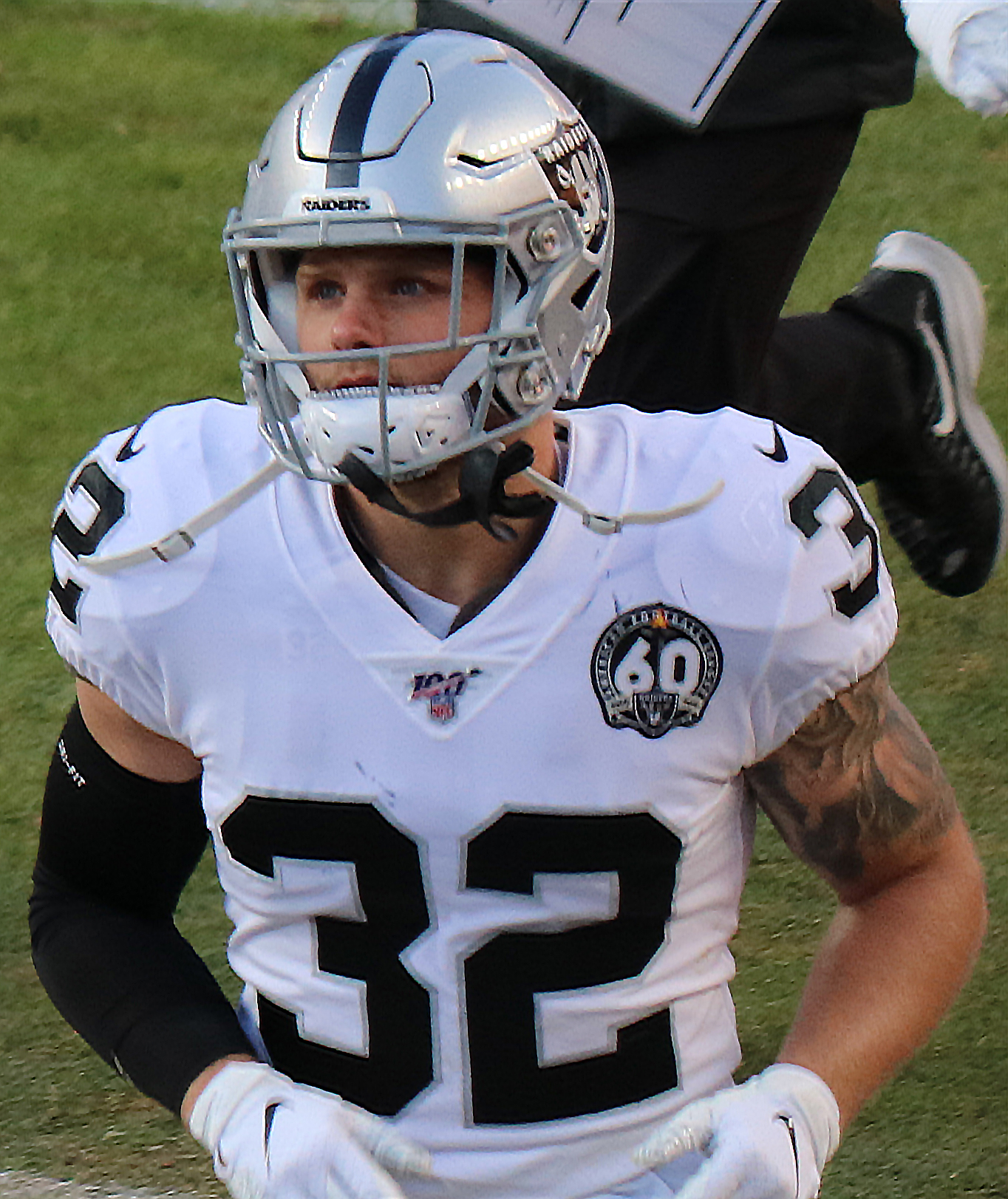
- Leavitt with the Oakland Raiders in 2019

Profile
- Position: Safety

Personal information
- Born: August 8, 1994 (age 32); Portland, Oregon, U.S.
- Listed height: 5 ft 10 in (1.78 m)
- Listed weight: 195 lb (88 kg)

Career information
- High school: Central Catholic (Portland, Oregon)
- College: BYU (2013–2014); Utah State (2015–2017)
- NFL draft: 2018: undrafted

Career history
- Oakland / Las Vegas Raiders (2018–2021); Green Bay Packers (2022–2023); Denver Broncos (2023)*
- * Offseason or practice squad member only

Career NFL statistics as of 2023
- Total tackles: 71
- Fumble recoveries: 2
- Pass deflections: 4
- Stats at Pro Football Reference

Dallin Leavitt (born August 8, 1994) is a former American professional football safety. He played college football at BYU and Utah State. He was signed by the Oakland Raiders of the National Football League as an undrafted free agent in 2018, and also played for the Green Bay Packers.

== Early life ==
Leavitt grew up in Portland, Oregon, and initially attended Westview High School before transferring to Central Catholic High School. He was a standout defensive back for the Rams and was considered a top collegiate prospect. He ultimately committed to Brigham Young University during his second year of high school over offers from Stanford, Oregon, and UCLA. He was named Oregon School Activities Association first-team all-state and was tabbed the 6A co-Defensive Player of the Year during his senior season.

== College career ==
=== BYU ===
Leavitt began his college career at Brigham Young University. He played two seasons for the Cougars, appearing in 24 games and starting five. As a sophomore, he recorded 43 tackles, including 3.5 for a loss, 1.5 sacks, and two passes defensed in 11 games (four starts). Leavitt announced that he would be transferring to Utah State University at the end of his sophomore season

=== Utah State ===
After sitting out a season due to NCAA transfer rules, Leavitt played for the Aggies for his final two seasons of eligibility. He appeared in 21 games, all starts, and recorded 151 tackles, including 2.5 for loss, with seven interceptions and six pass breakups. In his senior season, Leavitt started all 13 games and made 94 tackles (2nd on the team), 1 tackle for loss, four interceptions and five pass breakups and was named honorable mention All-Mountain West Conference. In total, Leavitt appeared in 45 games (26 starts) and accumulated 211 tackles, seven interceptions, eight pass breakups and 1.5 sacks over the course of his collegiate career.

== Professional career ==
Pre-draft measurables
Height	Weight	Arm length	Hand span	40-yard dash	10-yard split	20-yard split	20-yard shuttle	Three-cone drill	Vertical jump	Broad jump	Bench press
5 ft 10 in (1.78 m)	203 lb (92 kg)	29 5/8 in (0.75 m)	9 1/4 in (0.23 m)	4.56 s	1.54 s	2.65 s	4.19 s	6.73 s	34.5 in (0.88 m)	10 ft 2 in (3.10 m)	18 reps
All values from Pro Day

=== Oakland / Las Vegas Raiders ===
Leavitt signed with the Oakland Raiders as an undrafted free agent on May 14, 2018, after participating in a rookie minicamp on a tryout basis. He was cut by the Raiders at the end of training camp and subsequently re-signed to the team's practice squad on September 2. Leavitt was promoted to the Raiders' active roster on December 24, before the team's Monday night game against the Denver Broncos after an injury to cornerback Daryl Worley. Leavitt made his NFL debut that night in the Raiders' 27–14 win, playing 12 snaps on special teams and making a tackle.

Leavitt made the Raiders' 53-man roster out of training camp for the 2019 season. He played in 15 games, mostly on special teams, and made 10 total tackles.

Leavitt re-signed on a one-year contract with the Raiders on April 16, 2020. He was waived by Las Vegas on September 15, and was re-signed to the practice squad two days later. Leavitt was promoted back to the active roster on October 2.

Leavitt signed a one-year contract extension with the Raiders on March 8, 2021. He made 16 appearances (one start) for the team, recording two pass deflections, two fumble recoveries, and 35 combined tackles. Leavitt was released by the Raiders on July 20, 2022.

=== Green Bay Packers ===
On July 25, 2022, Leavitt was signed by the Green Bay Packers. He played in all 17 of Green Bay's contests, posting 13 combined tackles.

Leavitt re-signed with the Packers on April 4, 2023. He made 10 appearances for the team, recording two combined tackles. Leavitt was released by Green Bay on November 20.

=== Denver Broncos ===
On November 28, 2023, Leavitt was signed to the Denver Broncos' practice squad. He was released by the Broncos on December 19.

== NFL career statistics ==
=== Regular season ===
Year	Team	Games		Tackles				Interceptions						Fumbles	
Year	Team	GP	GS	Comb	Total	Ast	Sck	PD	Int	Yds	Avg	Lng	TDs	FF	FR
2018	OAK	2	0	1	0	1	0.0	0	0	0	0	0	0	0	0
2019	OAK	15	0	10	6	4	0.0	0	0	0	0	0	0	0	0
2020	LVR	9	0	10	4	6	0.0	2	0	0	0	0	0	0	0
2021	LVR	16	1	35	17	18	0.0	2	0	0	0	0	0	0	2
2022	GB	17	0	13	7	6	0.0	0	0	0	0	0	0	0	0
2023	GB	10	0	2	1	1	0.0	0	0	0	0	0	0	0	0
Career		69	1	71	35	36	0.0	4	0	0	0.0	0	0	0	2
Source: pro-football-reference.com

=== Postseason ===
Year	Team	Games		Tackles				Interceptions						Fumbles	
Year	Team	GP	GS	Comb	Total	Ast	Sck	PD	Int	Yds	Avg	Lng	TDs	FF	FR
2021	LVR	1	0	2	1	1	0.0	0	0	0	0.0	0	0	0	0
Career		1	0	2	1	1	0.0	0	0	0	0.0	0	0	0	0
Source: pro-football-reference.com

== Personal life ==
Leavitt's father, Jared, played linebacker for BYU from 1990 to 1991. Leavitt is an Eagle Scout. His wife Josie, is a former Utah State soccer player. His younger brother, Sam, plays quarterback at Louisiana State University. Leavitt was raised as a member of the LDS Church.
