= Samori Toure (American football) =

American football player (born 1999)

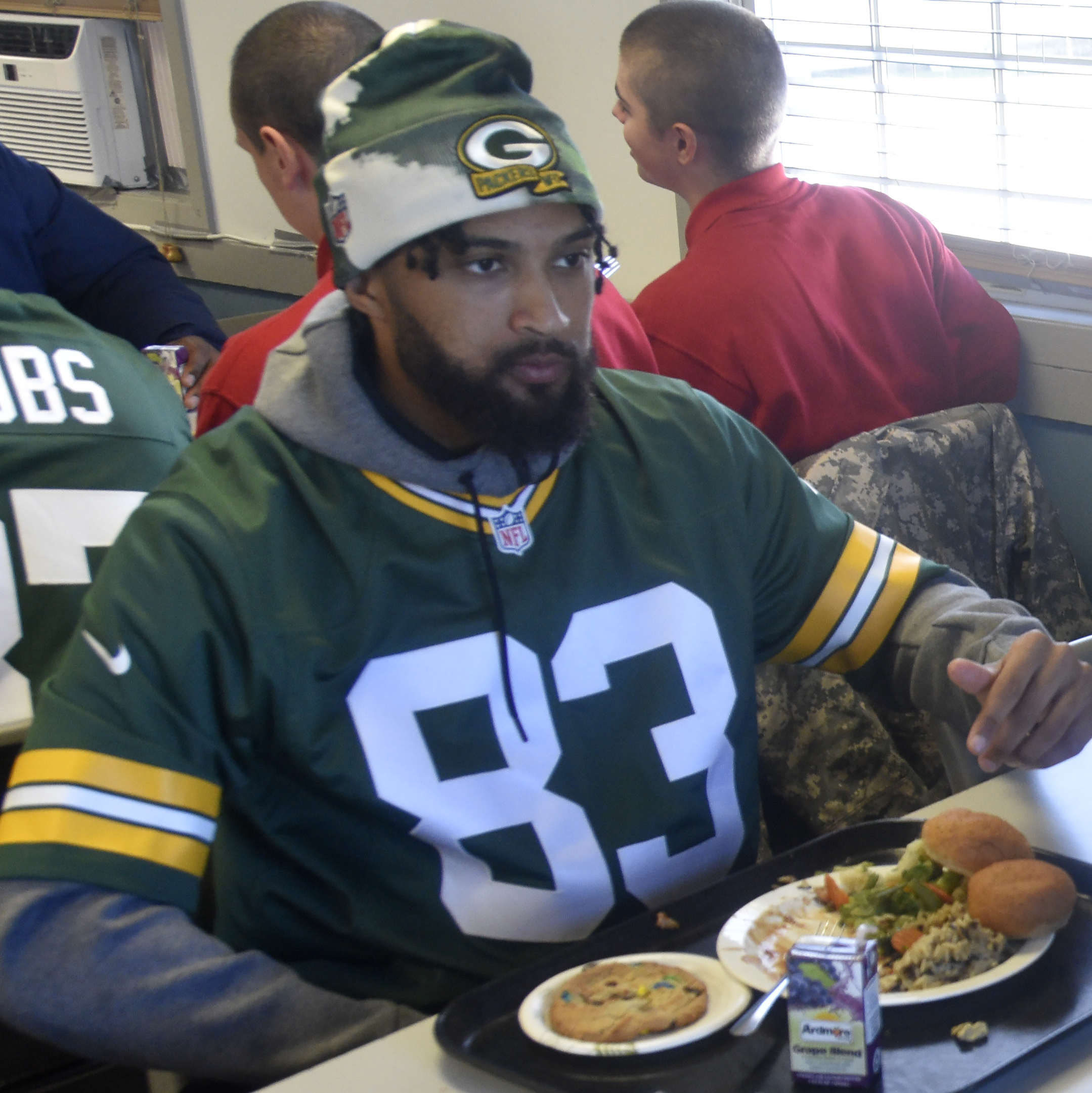
- Toure with the Green Bay Packers in 2022

No. 10 – Indianapolis Colts
- Position: Wide receiver
- Roster status: Practice squad

Personal information
- Born: March 24, 1998 (age 28); Portland, Oregon, U.S.
- Listed height: 6 ft 1 in (1.85 m)
- Listed weight: 196 lb (89 kg)

Career information
- High school: Westview (Portland)
- College: Montana (2016–2019); Nebraska (2021)
- NFL draft: 2022: 7th round, 258th overall pick

Career history
- Green Bay Packers (2022–2023); Chicago Bears (2024); Denver Broncos (2025)*; New Orleans Saints (2025); Philadelphia Eagles (2026)*; Indianapolis Colts (2026–present)*
- * Offseason or practice squad member only

Career NFL statistics as of 2025
- Receptions: 14
- Receiving yards: 163
- Receiving touchdowns: 1
- Stats at Pro Football Reference

Samori David Toure (born March 24, 1998) is an American professional football wide receiver for the Indianapolis Colts of the National Football League (NFL). He played college football for the Montana Grizzlies before transferring to the Nebraska Cornhuskers. He was drafted by the Green Bay Packers in the seventh round of the 2022 NFL draft.

== Professional career ==
Pre-draft measurables
Height	Weight	Arm length	Hand span	Wingspan	40-yard dash	10-yard split	20-yard split	20-yard shuttle	Three-cone drill	Vertical jump	Broad jump	Bench press
6 ft 0 3/4 in (1.85 m)	191 lb (87 kg)	32 1/4 in (0.82 m)	9 3/8 in (0.24 m)	6 ft 4 3/4 in (1.95 m)	4.48 s	1.64 s	2.62 s	4.22 s	6.77 s	34.5 in (0.88 m)	10 ft 4 in (3.15 m)	7 reps
All values from Pro Day

=== Green Bay Packers ===
Toure was selected in the seventh round (258th overall) by the Green Bay Packers in the 2022 NFL draft. He signed his rookie contract on May 6, 2022.

He made the initial 53-man roster to begin the 2022 season, but was inactive for the first six games. He saw his first NFL action on October 23, 2022, catching one pass for four yards in a Week 7 loss to the Washington Commanders. On October 30, he caught his first NFL touchdown, a 37-yard pass from Aaron Rodgers, during a week 8 loss to the Buffalo Bills.

On January 1, 2024, Toure was placed on injured reserve. He was released by the Packers on August 27.

During his two seasons in Green Bay, Toure appeared in 22 regular-season games. His time in Green Bay produced 13 receptions for 160 receiving yards and one touchdown.

=== Chicago Bears ===
The Chicago Bears added Toure to their practice squad on August 29, 2024. He signed a reserve/future contract with Chicago on January 6, 2025. On August 24, Toure was waived by the Bears.

=== Denver Broncos ===
On October 6, 2025, Toure signed with the Denver Broncos' practice squad. On October 28, he was released by the Broncos.

=== New Orleans Saints ===
On November 25, 2025, Toure signed to the New Orleans Saints' practice squad. On January 2, 2026, he was signed to the team's active roster. On April 27, Toure was waived by the Saints.

=== Philadelphia Eagles ===
On June 1, 2026, Toure was signed by the Philadelphia Eagles. He was waived by the Eagles on August 29.

=== Indianapolis Colts ===
On November 16, 2026, Toure was signed to the Indianapolis Colts practice squad.

== NFL career statistics ==
=== Regular season ===
Year	Team	Games		Receiving					Rushing					Fumbles	
Year	Team	GP	GS	Rec	Yds	Avg	Lng	TD	Att	Yds	Avg	Lng	TD	Fum	Lost
2022	GB	11	2	5	82	16.4	37	1	0	0	0.0	0	0	1	0
2023	GB	11	0	8	78	9.8	35	0	0	0	0.0	0	0	1	1
2025	NO	1	0	1	3	3.0	3	0	0	0	0.0	0	0	0	0
Total		23	2	14	163	11.6	37	1	0	0	0.0	0	0	2	1
Source: pro-football-reference.com

== Personal life ==
Born in Portland, Oregon, Toure is of Senegalese descent and is named after Almami Samori Toure, who is his great-great grandfather.
