= Luke Tenuta =

American football player (born 1999)

No. 67 – Indianapolis Colts
- Position: Offensive tackle
- Roster status: Active

Personal information
- Born: September 1, 1999 (age 27); Columbus, Ohio, U.S.
- Listed height: 6 ft 8 in (2.03 m)
- Listed weight: 314 lb (142 kg)

Career information
- High school: Western Albemarle (Crozet, Virginia)
- College: Virginia Tech (2018–2021)
- NFL draft: 2022: 6th round, 209th overall pick

Career history
- Buffalo Bills (2022)*; Indianapolis Colts (2022); Green Bay Packers (2022–2023); Arizona Cardinals (2024); Indianapolis Colts (2025–present)
- * Offseason or practice squad member only

Awards and highlights
- Third-team All-ACC (2021)

Career NFL statistics as of Week 8, 2026
- Games played: 15
- Stats at Pro Football Reference

Luke Nicholas Tenuta (born September 1, 1999) is an American professional football offensive tackle for the Indianapolis Colts of the National Football League (NFL). He played college football for the Virginia Tech Hokies, and was selected by the Buffalo Bills in the sixth round of the 2022 NFL draft. He has also been a member of the Arizona Cardinals and the Green Bay Packers.

== Professional career ==
Pre-draft measurables
Height	Weight	Arm length	Hand span	Wingspan	40-yard dash	10-yard split	20-yard split	20-yard shuttle	Three-cone drill	Vertical jump	Broad jump	Bench press
6 ft 8 in (2.03 m)	319 lb (145 kg)	32 7/8 in (0.84 m)	10 1/8 in (0.26 m)	6 ft 7 3/4 in (2.03 m)	5.28 s	1.76 s	2.98 s	4.77 s	7.75 s	32.0 in (0.81 m)	9 ft 0 in (2.74 m)	19 reps
All values from NFL Combine/Pro Day

=== Buffalo Bills ===
Tenuta was selected in the sixth round, 209th overall, of the 2022 NFL draft by the Buffalo Bills. On August 30, 2022, he was released by the Bills.

=== Indianapolis Colts (first stint) ===
On August 31, 2022, Tenuta was claimed off waivers by the Indianapolis Colts. On October 15, Tenuta was waived by Indianapolis.

=== Green Bay Packers ===
On October 18, 2022, Tenuta was claimed off waivers by the Green Bay Packers. He saw his first NFL action on December 25, playing four special teams snaps in a Week 16 victory over the Miami Dolphins.

Tenuta was placed on injured reserve on August 31, 2023, due to a right ankle injury. He was released on August 27, 2024.

=== Arizona Cardinals ===
On August 29, 2024, Tenuta was signed to the Arizona Cardinals' practice squad.

=== Indianapolis Colts (second stint) ===
On January 15, 2025, Tenuta signed a reserve/future contract with the Indianapolis Colts.

On March 20, 2026, Tenuta re-signed with the Colts. On August 31, Tenuta was released by the Colts; he was re-signed to the team's practice squad the same day. On September 8, Tenuta was signed to the active roster.
