= Caleb Jones (American football) =

American football player (born 1999)

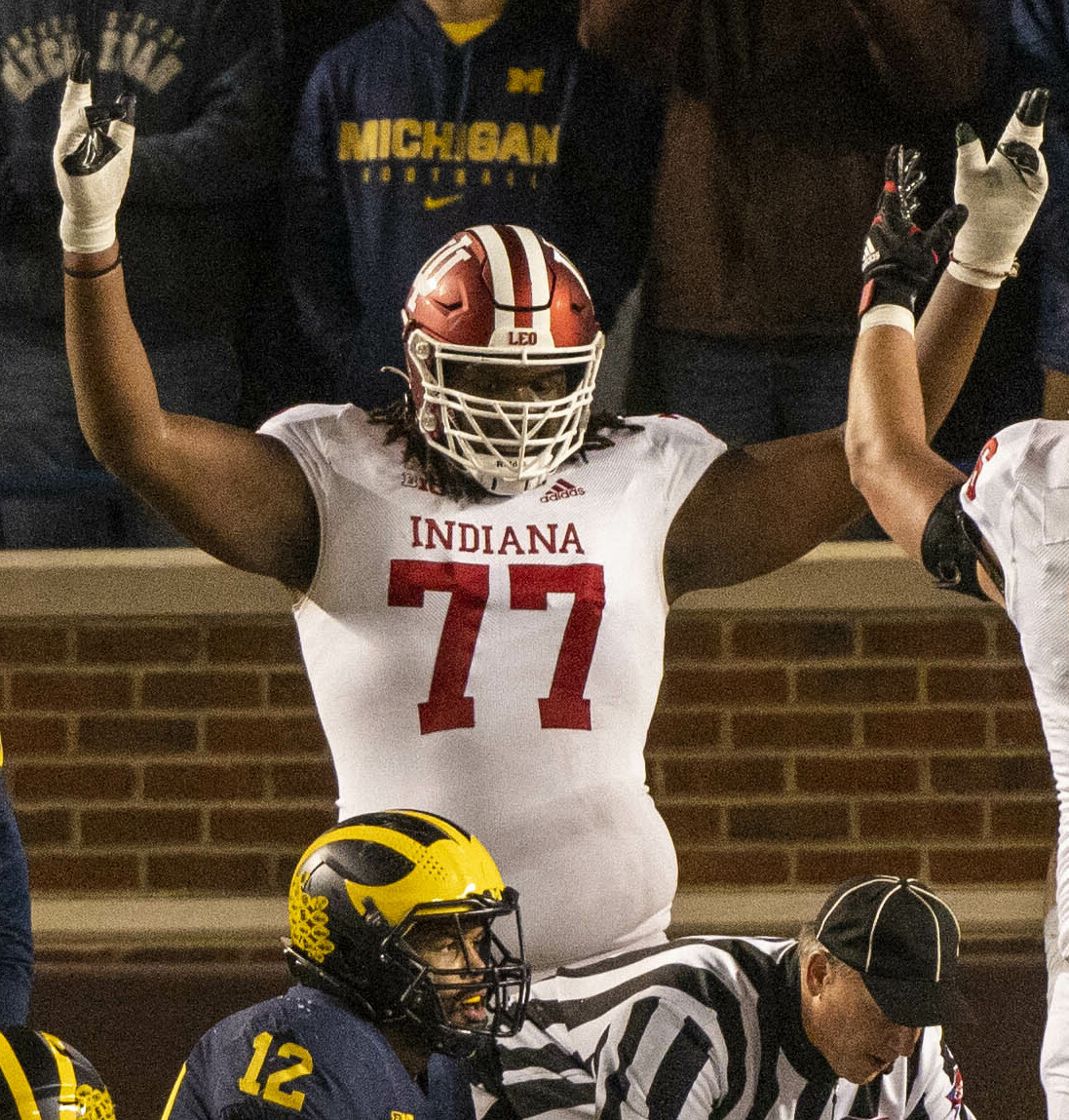
- Jones with the Indiana Hoosiers in 2021

Profile
- Position: Offensive tackle

Personal information
- Born: February 10, 1999 (age 27); Indianapolis, Indiana, U.S.
- Listed height: 6 ft 9 in (2.06 m)
- Listed weight: 370 lb (168 kg)

Career information
- High school: Lawrence North (Indianapolis, Indiana)
- College: Indiana (2017–2021)
- NFL draft: 2022: undrafted

Career history
- Green Bay Packers (2022–2023); New England Patriots (2024–2025)*; Columbus Aviators (2026)*
- * Offseason or practice squad member only

Career NFL statistics as of 2024
- Games played: 1
- Games started: 0
- Stats at Pro Football Reference

Caleb Jones (born February 10, 1999) is an American professional football offensive tackle. He played college football for the Indiana Hoosiers.

== Early life and college ==
Caleb Jones was born on February 10, 1999, in Indianapolis, Indiana to Darice Maxie and James Jones. Jones attended Lawrence North High School, where he played football, track-and-field, and basketball.

After his successful tenure in high school, Jones was named an Associated Press all-state offensive lineman for the state of Indiana. Jones was rated as the twelfth-best player in the state of Indiana going into college and chose to attend Indiana University. Jones redshirted his freshman year and never played a down for Indiana. In his sophomore year, Jones started his first game against FIU and played in eleven games that year. Jones then started the most games in a season he ever would for Indiana, starting twelve games at right tackle and one game at left tackle. With the help of Jones' blocking, Indiana set a school record for the most passing yards in a season. The next year, due to a shortened season caused by the COVID-19 pandemic, Jones only started five games for Indiana. In Jones' senior and final year, he started all twelve games for Indiana at right tackle.

== Professional career ==
Pre-draft measurables
Height	Weight	Arm length	Hand span	Wingspan	40-yard dash	10-yard split	20-yard split	Vertical jump	Broad jump	Bench press
6 ft 8 7/8 in (2.05 m)	370 lb (168 kg)	36 in (0.91 m)	9 1/2 in (0.24 m)	7 ft 2 5/8 in (2.20 m)	5.60 s	1.88 s	3.18 s	21.0 in (0.53 m)	7 ft 5 in (2.26 m)	18 reps
All values from Pro Day

=== Green Bay Packers ===
After going undrafted in the 2022 NFL draft, Jones was signed as an undrafted free agent by the Green Bay Packers. Jones did not initially make the Packers' 53-man roster and was signed to the practice squad. However, due to a lack of depth at offensive line during the 2022 NFL season, Jones was signed from the practice squad to the Packers' roster. On October 1, 2022, Jones was placed on the non-football illness list, and later activated on December 14. After the 2023 season, he was offered a tender. He was released on August 27, 2024.

=== New England Patriots ===
On September 3, 2024, the New England Patriots signed Jones to their practice squad. He signed a reserve/future contract with the team on January 6, 2025. On March 21, Jones was released by the Patriots.

=== Columbus Aviators ===
On January 14, 2026, Jones was selected by the Columbus Aviators of the United Football League (UFL). He was released on March 19.
