= Nate Becker =

American football player (born 1996)

No. 81
- Position: Tight end

Personal information
- Born: March 24, 1996 (age 30); Indianapolis, Indiana, U.S.
- Listed height: 6 ft 5 in (1.96 m)
- Listed weight: 264 lb (120 kg)

Career information
- High school: Carmel (Carmel, Indiana)
- College: Miami (OH)
- NFL draft: 2019: undrafted

Career history
- Detroit Lions (2019)*; Buffalo Bills (2019–2021); Carolina Panthers (2022)*; Green Bay Packers (2022)*; Arlington Renegades (2023)
- * Offseason or practice squad member only

Awards and highlights
- XFL champion (2023)
- Stats at Pro Football Reference

Nate Becker (born March 24, 1996) is an American former football tight end. He played college football for the Miami RedHawks.

== Professional career ==
Pre-draft measurables
Height	Weight	Arm length	Hand span	Wingspan	40-yard dash	10-yard split	20-yard split	20-yard shuttle	Three-cone drill	Vertical jump	Broad jump	Bench press
6 ft 4 7/8 in (1.95 m)	258 lb (117 kg)	31 1/2 in (0.80 m)	9 5/8 in (0.24 m)	6 ft 4 in (1.93 m)	5.10 s	1.78 s	2.90 s	4.50 s	7.41 s	35.0 in (0.89 m)	9 ft 6 in (2.90 m)	24 reps
All values from Pro Day

=== Detroit Lions ===
Becker was signed by the Detroit Lions as an undrafted free agent on May 10, 2019. He was cut two days later.

=== Buffalo Bills ===
Becker was signed by the Buffalo Bills on June 5, 2019. He was waived at the end of training camp during final roster cuts, but was re-signed by the team to their practice squad on September 2, 2019. He was waived again by the team shortly afterwards but was re-signed to the practice squad on September 12 and remained there for the rest of his rookie season. Becker was signed to a reserve/futures contract at the end of the season on January 6, 2020.

Becker was again cut at the end of preseason training camp in 2020 and was re-signed to the practice squad a few weeks later on September 23, 2020. He was elevated to the active roster on January 2, 2021, for the team's week 17 game against the Miami Dolphins, and reverted to the practice squad after the game. On January 26, 2021, Becker signed a reserves/futures contract with the Bills.

Becker was released by the Bills on August 31, 2021.

=== Carolina Panthers ===
On August 11, 2022, Becker signed with the Carolina Panthers. He was waived three days later.

=== Green Bay Packers ===
On August 16, 2022, Becker was claimed off waivers by the Green Bay Packers. He was waived/injured on August 30, 2022, and placed on injured reserve. He was released off injured reserve on September 2, 2022.

=== Arlington Renegades ===
Becker signed with the Arlington Renegades of the XFL in February 2023. He was not part of the roster after the 2024 UFL dispersal draft on January 15, 2024.
