= Elgton Jenkins =

American football player (born 1995)

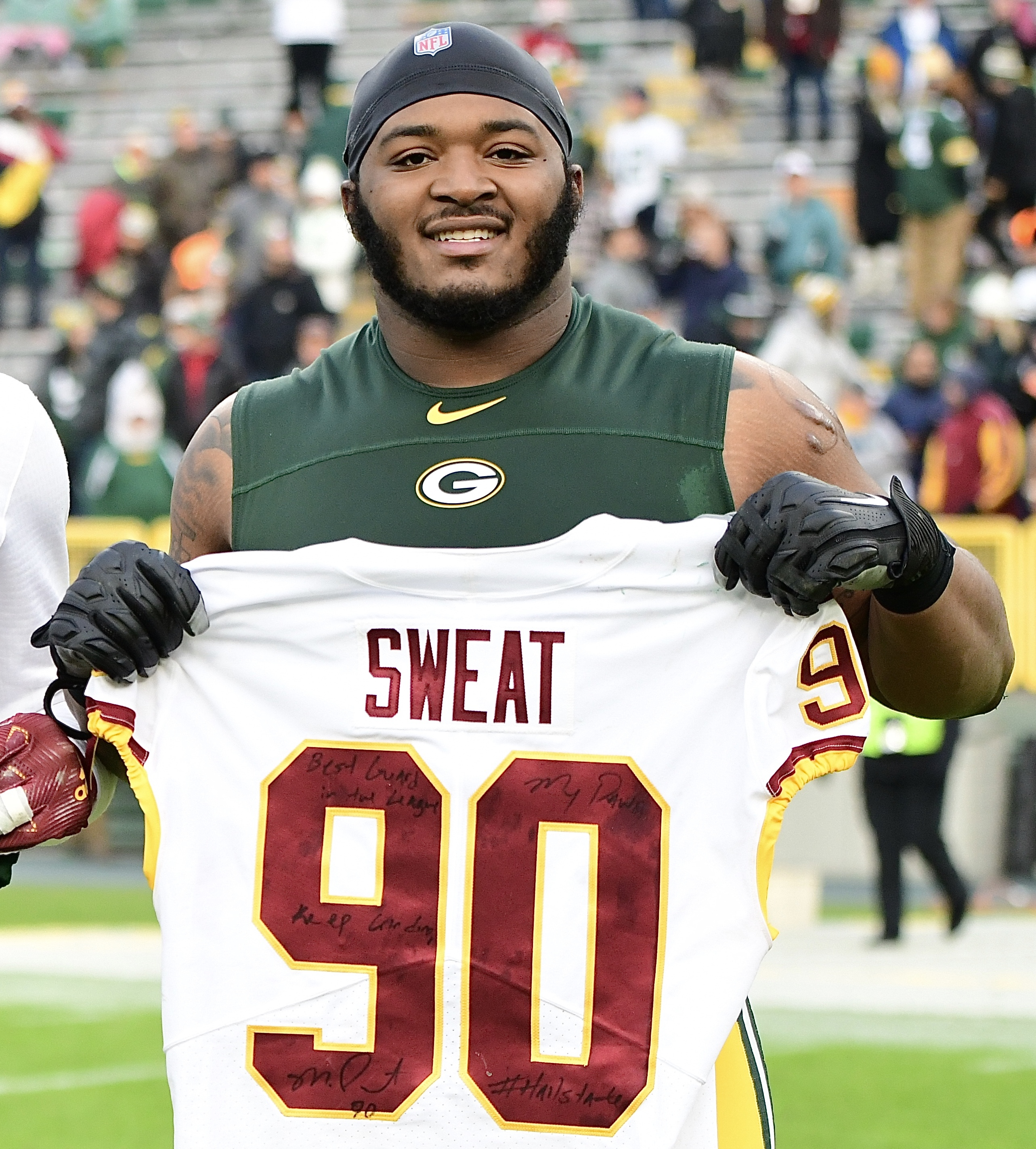
- Jenkins with the Green Bay Packers in 2019

No. 74 – Cleveland Browns
- Position: Center
- Roster status: Active

Personal information
- Born: December 26, 1995 (age 30); Clarksdale, Mississippi, U.S.
- Listed height: 6 ft 5 in (1.96 m)
- Listed weight: 310 lb (141 kg)

Career information
- High school: Clarksdale
- College: Mississippi State (2014–2018)
- NFL draft: 2019: 2nd round, 44th overall pick

Career history
- Green Bay Packers (2019–2025); Cleveland Browns (2026–present)

Awards and highlights
- 2× Pro Bowl (2020, 2022); PFWA All-Rookie Team (2019)

Career NFL statistics as of Week 10, 2026
- Games played: 105
- Games started: 103
- Stats at Pro Football Reference

Elgton Torrance Jenkins Jr. (born December 26, 1995) is an American professional football center for the Cleveland Browns of the National Football League (NFL). He played college football for the Mississippi State Bulldogs and was selected by the Packers in the second round of the 2019 NFL draft.

== Professional career ==
Pre-draft measurables
| Height | Weight | Arm length | Hand span | Wingspan | 40-yard dash | 10-yard split | 20-yard split | 20-yard shuttle | Three-cone drill | Vertical jump | Broad jump | Bench press |
|---|---|---|---|---|---|---|---|---|---|---|---|---|
| 6 ft 4 1/2 in (1.94 m) | 310 lb (141 kg) | 34 in (0.86 m) | 10 1/4 in (0.26 m) | 6 ft 11 in (2.11 m) | 5.10 s | 1.78 s | 2.96 s | 4.62 s | 7.77 s | 28.0 in (0.71 m) | 9 ft 1 in (2.77 m) | 29 reps |
All values from NFL Combine/40 time from Pro Day

=== Green Bay Packers ===
Jenkins was selected by the Green Bay Packers with the 44th overall pick in the second round of the 2019 NFL draft. He signed his four-year rookie contract on May 13, 2019, worth $6.782 million. After entering his rookie season as a backup, Jenkins made his first NFL start on September 22, in a Week 3 game against the Denver Broncos, replacing an injured Lane Taylor. On 571 pass-blocking snaps this season, Jenkins did not allow a single sack. He was named to the PFWA All-Rookie Team. In the 2020 season, he started in all 16 regular season games and both postseason games for the Packers. For the 2020 season, he earned his first Pro Bowl nod as a starter.

Jenkins entered the 2021 season as the Packers starting left tackle in place of an injured David Bakhtiari. He started eight games there before suffering a torn ACL in Week 11 of a 34–31 loss to the Minnesota Vikings. The Packers placed him on injured reserve two days later, ending his season.

On December 23, 2022, Jenkins signed a four-year, $68 million contract extension. In the 2022 season, he appeared in and started 15 games. He was named as an alternate to the 2023 Pro Bowl. In the 2023 season, he appeared in and started 15 regular season games and both of the Packers' postseason games.

After the Packers signed Aaron Banks during the 2025 offseason, Brian Gutekunst announced that Jenkins would be moving to center. He started all nine of his appearances for Green Bay during the regular season. On November 10, 2025, Jenkins was diagnosed with a lower-leg fracture, which was suffered in the team's Week 10 loss to the Philadelphia Eagles. He was placed on injured reserve the following day, after ligament damage was revealed.

On March 9, 2026, Jenkins was released by the Packers.

=== Cleveland Browns ===
On March 11, 2026, Jenkins signed a two-year, $24 million contract with the Cleveland Browns.
