= Lloyd A. Jeffress =

American scientist

- Born: Lloyd Alexander Jeffress; November 15, 1900; San Jose, California, U.S.
- Died: April 2, 1986 (aged 85); Austin, Texas, U.S.
- Education: University of California, Berkeley; B.S. in Physics; Ph.D. in Psychology
- Awards: First ASA Silver Medal in Psychological and Physiological Acoustics (1977)
- Scientific career
- Fields: Psychoacoustics; Psychophysics; Sound localization; Auditory masking; Mine hunting
- Workplaces: Professor of Psychology, University of Texas at Austin (1926–1977); Hixon Visiting Professor, California Institute of Technology (1947–1948)

Lloyd Alexander Jeffress (November 15, 1900 – April 2, 1986) was an acoustical scientist, a professor of experimental psychology at the University of Texas at Austin, and a developer of mine-hunting models for the US Navy during World War II and after, Jeffress was known to psychologists for his pioneering research on auditory masking in psychoacoustics, his stimulus-oriented approach to signal-detection theory in psychophysics, and his "ingenious" electronic and mathematical models of the auditory process.

Jeffress received the first-ever silver medal in Psychological and Physiological Acoustics from the Acoustical Society of America in 1977 for "extensive contributions in psychoacoustics, particularly binaural hearing, and for the example he has set as a teacher and scholar."

== Early life and education ==
Lloyd A. Jeffress was born on November 11, 1900, in San Jose, California, the only child in a family that moved a short time later to Portland, Oregon, where Jeffress grew up and went to high school. From grammar school on, one of Jeffress' closest friends was double Nobel Prize winner Linus Pauling, who regularly credited Jeffress with showing him his first chemistry experiment when they were both 13.

In 1918, Jeffress enrolled at Oregon Agricultural College (later Oregon State University) at Corvallis, where he was Pauling's roommate. The next year, he transferred to the University of California at Berkeley as a physics major, but, while completing that degree, he became increasingly interested in the newly expanding field of experimental psychology.

Jeffress was accepted as a graduate student in psychology at the only school to which he applied, UC Berkeley, in 1922, and soon associated himself with Warner Brown. Jeffress completed a dissertation with Brown in 1926 concerning the galvanic skin response, and the two men remained close friends until Brown's death.

As a college senior at Berkeley, Jeffress met Sylvia Bloomberg, who was then a first-year graduate student in psychology working with Edward C. Tolman and who lived in the same boarding house as Jeffress.

== Career ==
The Jeffresses moved to Texas in the summer of 1926, where Lloyd began his 51-year career teaching at the University of Texas at Austin. In 1927, psychology first became a department separate from philosophy at Texas, and Jeffress was one of six members of the new psychology department in a UT faculty of 111. Jeffress was promoted to full professor in 1937 and was Chairman of the UT psychology department from 1936 to 1947.

=== Life in science ===
Jeffress' academic lineage descended directly from the "father of Experimental Psychology," Wilhelm Wundt, in four steps. Jeffress' Ph.D. advisor at Berkeley, Warner Brown, had studied with Robert S. Woodworth, who was a student of James McKeen Cattell, who was a student of Wundt.

While he was at Berkeley in 1925, his knowledge of physics and love of gadgets led him to develop a self-recording maze that gained him a publication—his first—with one of the best-known cognitive psychologists of his time, E.C Tolman. Both psychology and physics would remain of interest to him, and he often had to struggle with his loyalties to one or the other.

Jeffress's career was notable in that his scientific career gained momentum throughout his life, rather than consisting of a "great flutter of activity" followed by a slow decline. Of his more than 115 published papers, only 14 were published before he was 50 years old. It was only after he began his long association with UT's Defense Research Laboratory (DRL) in 1950 that he had assistants capable of, and interested in, doing all the menial work necessary to implement and run the experiments he said he had been thinking about all along.

=== The Jeffress model ===
Beginning about 1940, Jeffress' primary research interest was the auditory system, especially the mechanisms underlying sound localization. His most cited article, "A Place Theory of Sound Localization", was in the 1948 Journal of Comparative and Physiological Psychology. In the article, he describes a hypothetical neural network capable of cross-correlating the temporal (time) information at the two ears and thereby extracting the small differences that can exist in the time of arrival of a wavefront at the two ears, thus localizing the sound. This neurocomputational model that explains how auditory systems can register and analyze small differences in the arrival time of sounds at the two ears in order to estimate the direction of sound sources became known as the Jeffress model.

The Jeffress model was used as an accepted explanatory basis for many of the facts of binaural hearing for more than 60 years, and it has repeatedly been shown to be conceptually correct, although not explicitly correct neurally. Otolaryngologist Peter Cariani of the Harvard Medical School wrote on Scholarpedia: "Subsequent neuroanatomy and neurophysiology has largely confirmed the basic premises of the basic model (see (Joris and Yin 2007; Joris 2006; Joris et al. 1998) albeit (arguably) with better correspondences in birds than in mammals. ... Whether discrepancies between the original Jeffress' model assumptions and the more recent neurophysiological data constitute a refutation of the core signal processing principles of the model (binaural temporal cross-correlation operations on temporally-coded inputs) has been a matter of ongoing discussion and debate."

The Jeffress model is also part of any discussion of coincidence detection in neurobiology.

In teaching about sound localization, Jeffress was known to ask his students: "What are the three most important aspects of sound?" Students often answered, "Frequency, amplitude, and phase." "No!" Jeffress would exclaim. "Where it is, whether it can eat you, and whether you can eat it."

=== The Hixon Symposium ===
Jeffress left Austin for only one year following his arrival in 1926. In 1947 and 1948, he worked as the Hixon visiting professor at the California Institute of Technology, where he brought together many premiere scientists of his day to examine the state of knowledge about human behavior and the brain.

The Hixon professorship developed out of a conversation Jeffress had had with Linus Pauling, who was then at Caltech. Pauling remembers that around 1946, a gift was made to the school to support work on the functioning of the brain. Pauling was a member of the Hixon Fund Committee, which decided to use the money to hold a symposium on cerebral mechanisms. Because they understood preparation for and running such a symposium would be difficult and would require a knowledgeable person, Pauling suggested Jeffress, whom the committee accepted, and who then lived for the year in the Paulings' house in Pasadena while Pauling and his family were at Oxford.

The participants in the 1948 Hixon Symposium on neural mechanisms were noted academics from a number of disciplines: Pauling (chemistry), Heinrich Klüver (cybernetics), John von Neumann (cellular automata), Karl Lashley (behavior and learning), Ogden Lindsley (precision teaching), Rafael Lorente de Nó (neuroanatomy/neurophysiology), Warren McCulloch (neural network modeling), and W.C. Halstead (neuropsychological assessment). Many of the papers collected in Cerebral Mechanisms in Behavior: The Hixon Symposium, with Jeffress as editor, became classics cited in thousands of scientific articles.

The Science magazine review of the book said: "The Hixon Symposium has significance for anyone concerned with the theory of human behavior and contraptions man himself has built—namely, computing and cybernetic machinery." The book was first published in 1951 and was reissued in 1969.

=== Mine-hunting research at DRL ===
At the outset of World War II, Jeffress was able to draw directly upon his undergraduate training in physics. Professor Paul Boner of the UT Physics Department took leave from Texas to work at the Underwater Sound Lab at Harvard University, and Jeffress was asked to take over his freshman physics course. Upon his return after the war, Boner became director of the Defense Research Laboratory (DRL) at the University of Texas, and Jeffress eventually became head of the Psychoacoustics Division. DRL became Applied Research Laboratory (ARL) in 1968.

Before joining DRL as a part-time staff member in 1950, Jeffress worked on campus at UT with the War Research Lab, where he helped with the development and testing of a new gun sight for the B-29 and B-36 bombers, as well as with the Military Physics Research Lab. Both of those Labs eventually became part of DRL.

Jeffress' first project at DRL was to determine whether the improvement humans show when detecting binaural rather than monaural signals could be adapted to Navy sonars. Jeffress designed and built an experimental binaural sonar that he and his students tested at Austin's Lake Travis. While this project was unsuccessful, it initiated a program at DRL on masking and binaural hearing that endured, and was highly productive, for more than 20 years.

In 1953, DRL had collected extensive raw data during the evaluation of several US Navy mine-hunting sonars. These data, which were in the form of photographic and magnetic tape recordings, had to be analyzed in detail to provide quantitative measures of target detection probability, location errors, etc., as a function of a number of variables. Because Jeffress had a much better knowledge of probability and statistics than anyone else then on the DRL staff, he was invited to undertake the necessary analyses.

Jeffress quickly planned the analysis operation, invented and built the complex analysis hardware, analyzed the data, and published the results, all in a matter of a few months. Almost overnight, Jeffress had established his reputation as an expert in mine hunting, a reputation that was to grow steadily over the next two decades.

This initial work, together with subsequent similar evaluations, led Jeffress to the development of a mine-hunting technique known as clustering. He first used data collected at sea to develop the technique, he then proceeded to use numerical models (which involved random number theory), and finally developed a theoretical model (in closed analytical form). The Navy readily accepted his work and requested that he write the tactical doctrine on clustering. This document, together with other reports he wrote, remained the standard works on mine hunting and were still to be found on every mine-hunting craft in the US Fleet at Jeffress' death.

Jeffress made many contributions to the science of mine countermeasures, especially in the areas of precise radio and acoustic navigation systems. Much of his work in this area was declassified in 1997, more than 10 years after his death.

One of Jeffress' memorials recalled that Jeffress was considered remarkable at DRL because he was able to pursue his university teaching, do his fundamental research in psychoacoustics, and do his applied work in mine hunting all at the same time—and be successful at all three. The same memorial notes that Jeffress managed to get funding at DRL from the Navy in a unique way: "Jeffress' basic research in psychoacoustics at DRL was sponsored by the Navy's Bureau of Ships, an agency that normally deals with the development and procurement of hardware, while much of his applied work in mine hunting was funded by the Office of Naval Research (ONR), whose charter is to sponsor fundamental research."

=== Later years ===
In 1971, Jeffress retired from full-time teaching at the University of Texas and went on modified service. In this role, he taught courses in mathematical statistics to graduate students and introductory statistics to undergraduates. He retired from the university and became a professor emeritus in 1977.

After retiring at 76, Jeffress went to work at Dynastat, an Austin company specializing in testing and evaluation of voice communication systems that is owned by one of Jeffress' first doctoral students, William D. Voiers. Jeffress had the responsibility of getting the everyday operations of Dynastat computerized. This included developing programs for analyzing speech perception data. He continued to work for Dynastat until 1984.

Jeffress died in Austin on April 2, 1986, at the age of 85. After his death, UT established the Lloyd A. Jeffress Memorial Fellowship, the first winner of which was Dr. Beverly Wright, who went on to win the Acoustical Society of America's R. Bruce Lindsay Award for the advancement of theoretical or applied acoustics, or both.

Linus Pauling wrote after Jeffress' death: "I have many friends, but I continue to think of Lloyd Alexander Jeffress as my best friend."

=== Notable achievements ===
In the early 1950s, when Jeffress was in his 50s, some research by J.C.R. Licklider and I.J. Hirsh on what later came to be called masking-level differences caught Jeffress' attention and began him on a two-decade research program in which he and his students documented various aspects of the binaural system's performance in signal-detection tasks. Upon his death, the American Journal of Psychology (AJP) called Jeffress the "acknowledged authority" on auditory masking and masking-level differences.

Jeffress also had a long-standing interest in pitch perception, and published on such issues as short-term fluctuations in the tuning of the auditory periphery and the continuously changing pitch of a beating two-tone complex (see articles below).

Jeffress' approach to understanding sensory and perceptual behavior was to examine the physical stimulus carefully first to attempt to isolate those aspects of it that appeared to be critical. Perhaps the best example of this was his treatment of signal-detection theory as applied to human observers: "reinventing" signal-detection from a physics perspective, according to the AJP. In a series of papers published in the Journal of the Acoustical Society of America in the 1960s, Jeffress developed what he called a "stimulus-oriented" view of human detection performance. The AJP called his 1964 article, "Stimulus-Oriented Approach to Detection Theory," a classic.

Jeffress was known for building and testing models to simulate components of the auditory system. In particular, he simultaneously developed mathematical and electrical models of monaural signal detection and compared their performance under a number of stimulus manipulations to that of humans detecting under the same stimulus conditions. The final versions of these models were highly successful at predicting numerous psychophysical facts.

Jeffress joined the Acoustical Society of America in 1939 and was elected a fellow in 1948. He served the ASA for eight years as a Journal of the Acoustical Society of America associate editor of psychological acoustics beginning in 1962. This was among the longest terms of service for any associate editor, and it was the longest for an associate editor in psychological and physiological acoustics. Upon Jeffress' retirement as associate editor, the job was re-examined and found to be too much for one person, and two subsections were formed with an associate editor for each.

Jeffress was also a fellow of the American Association for the Advancement of Science (AAAS) and of the American Psychological Association (APA). Although nominated for membership in the Society of Experimental Psychologists, he was never invited to join.

In 1971, Jeffress received the Beltone Award for distinguished accomplishment as an educator, and, in 1978, the UT Psychology Department honored his long and distinguished service during its golden anniversary activities. In 1979, Jeffress received the Distinguished Service Award of the American Speech-Language-Hearing Association.

== Later years ==
In 1971, Jeffress retired from full-time teaching at the University of Texas and went on modified service. In this role, he taught courses in mathematical statistics to graduate students and introductory statistics to undergraduates. He retired from the university and became a professor emeritus in 1977.

After retiring at 76, Jeffress went to work at Dynastat, an Austin company specializing in testing and evaluation of voice communication systems that is owned by one of Jeffress' first doctoral students, William D. Voiers. Jeffress had the responsibility of getting the everyday operations of Dynastat computerized. This included developing programs for analyzing speech perception data. He continued to work for Dynastat until 1984.

== Death ==
Jeffress died in Austin on April 2, 1986, at the age of 85. After his death, UT established the Lloyd A. Jeffress Memorial Fellowship, the first winner of which was Dr. Beverly Wright, who went on to win the Acoustical Society of America's R. Bruce Lindsay Award for the advancement of theoretical or applied acoustics, or both.

Linus Pauling wrote after Jeffress' death: "I have many friends, but I continue to think of Lloyd Alexander Jeffress as my best friend."

== Bibliography ==
=== Articles ===
- Tolman, E.C.; Jeffress, L.A. (1925) "A self-recording maze," Journal of Comparative Psychology 5: 455, DOI 10.1037/h0074396
- Jeffress, L.A. (1944), "Variations in pitch," American Journal of Psychology 57: 63, DOI 10.2307/1416859, WOS:000200117900003
- Jeffress, L.A. (1948), "A place theory of sound localization," Journal of Comparative and Physiological Psychology 41: 35, DOI 10.1037/h0061495, WOS:A1948UP82300005, PM 18904764
- Deatherage, B.H.; Jeffress, L.A.; Blodgett, H.C. (1954), "A note on the audibility of intense ultrasonic sound," Journal of the Acoustical Society of America 26: 582, DOI 10.1121/1.1907379, WOS:A1954UD61800019
- Wilbanks, W.A.; Blodgett, H.C.; Jeffress, L.A. (1954), "The effect of large interaural time differences upon the judgment of sidedness," Journal of the Acoustical Society of America 26: 945, DOI 10.1121/1.1928003, WOS:A1954UD61900129
- Jeffress, L.A.; Blodgett, H.C.; Sandel, T.T.; and Wood, C.L., III. (1956), "Masking of Tonal Signals," Journal of the Acoustical Society of America 28, 416-426, DOI 10.1121/1.1908346
- Feddersen, W.E.; Sandel, T.T.; Teas, D.C.; Jeffress, L.A. (1957), "Localization of high-frequency tones," Journal of the Acoustical Society of America 29: 988, DOI 10.1121/1.1909356, WOS:A1957WK52200002
- Jeffress, L.A.; Blodgett, H.C.; Wood, C.L. (1958), "Detecting a signal in noise," Journal of the Acoustical Society of America 30: 802, DOI 10.1121/1.1909767, WOS:A1958WK53300018
- Jeffress, L.A. (1958), "Medial geniculate body – a disavowal," (letter) Journal of the Acoustical Society of America 30: 802, DOI 10.1121/1.1909769, WOS:A1958WK53300019.
- Jeffress, L.A.; Moushegian, G. (1959), "Hearing," Annual Review of Psychology 10: 395, DOI 10.1146/annurev.ps.10.020159.002143, WOS:A1959CCX0500015
- Moushegian, G.; Jeffress, L.A. (1959), "Localization of low-frequency tones," Journal of the Acoustical Society of America 31: 830, DOI 10.1121/1.1930368, WOS:A1959WK54300028
- Jeffress, L.A.; Taylor, R.W. (1961), "Lateralization vs localization," Journal of the Acoustical Society of America 33: 482, DOI 10.1121/1.1908697, WOS:A19612936B00007
- Jeffress, L.A. (1962), "Absolute Pitch," Journal of the Acoustical Society of America 34: 987, DOI 10.1121/1.1918237
- Jeffress, L.A.; Blodgett, H.C.; Deatherage, B.H. (1962) "Effect of Interaural Correlation on the Precision of Centering a Noise," Journal of the Acoustical Society of America 34: 1122, DOI 10.1121/1.1918257
- Jeffress, L.A. (1964), "Stimulus-Oriented Approach to Detection Theory," Journal of the Acoustical Society of America 36: 766, DOI 10.1121/1.1919064
- Jeffress, L.A. (1968), "Mathematical and electrical models of auditory detection," Journal of the Acoustical Society of America 44: 187, DIO 10.1121/1.1911053, WOS:A1968B547300025, PM 5659833
- Love, L.R.; Jeffress, L.A. (1971) "Identification of brief pauses in fluent speech of stutterers and nonstutterers," Journal of Speech and Hearing Research 14: 229, WOS:A1971J703100001, PM 5558075
- Jeffress, L.A. (1972), "Binaural Signal Detection," Foundations of Modern Auditory Theory, Vol. 2, Tobias, J.V., ed., Academic Press, New York
- McFadden, D.; Jeffress, L.A.; Russell, W.E. (1973), "Individual differences in sensitivity to interaural differences in time and level," Perceptual and Motor Skills 37: 755, WOS:A1973R662300017, PM 4764506
- Green, D.M.; Nachmias, J.; Kearney, J.K.; Jeffress, L.A. (1979) "Intensity discrimination with gated and continuous sinusoids," Journal of the Acoustical Society of America 66: 1051, DOI 10.1121/1.383324, WOS:A1979HQ54600014, PM 512214

=== Selected Defense Research Laboratory Acoustical reports ===
- DRL-A-89, "Statistical Methods Applied to Mine Hunting," by L. A. Jeffress, et al., 12 November 1956, Originally Confidential
- DRL-A-208, "A Proposed Navigational System for MSOs," by L. A. Jeffress, 14 February 1963, Confidential

=== Selected books and reports ===
- Jeffress, L.A., ed., Cerebral Mechanisms in Behavior: The Hixon Symposium [held at the California Institute of Technology in September, 1948], Wiley, New York (1951)
- Jeffress, L.A., Masking and Binaural Phenomena, DRL Acoustical Report 245, University of Texas at Austin Defense Research Laboratory, Defense Technical Information Center (1965)
- Jeffress, L.A., Study: Mine-Hunting Techniques, DRL Acoustical Report 246, University of Texas at Austin Defense Research Laboratory (1966)
- Jeffress, L.A., Contributions of Psychophysics to Sonar, (Report ARL-JM-69-23) Applied Research Laboratories, University of Texas, Austin (1969)
- Jeffress, L.A., Mine Hunting Procedures, (Report ARL-TR-69-28) Applied Research Laboratories, University of Texas, Austin (1969)(Confidential).
