= Tim Tully =

American neurobiologist (born 1954)

- Born: 1954 (age 71–72); Washington, Illinois
- Education: University of Illinois at Urbana–Champaign
- Known for: Memory
- Scientific career
- Fields: Neuroscience
- Institutions: Brandeis University; Cold Spring Harbor Laboratory; Dart Neuroscience; National Tsing Hua University
- Thesis: Behavior-Genetic Analysis of the Black Blow Fly, Phormia Regina, Using the Central Excitatory State (CES) (1981)
- Doctoral advisor: Jerry Hirsch

Timothy Paul Tully (born 1954) is an American neurobiologist who is the chief scientific officer and executive vice president for research & development at the San Diego–based biotechnology company Dart Neuroscience. He is known for his research on the role of genetics in human memory. With the support of billionaire Ken Dart, he is also attempting to create a pharmaceutical drug that would give its takers a photographic memory, which has been dubbed "Viagra for the brain" by the media.

== Education and career ==
Born in Washington, Illinois, Tully attended the University of Illinois at Urbana–Champaign, from which he received his B.S. in 1976 and his Ph.D. in 1981. At the University of Illinois, he studied under Jerry Hirsch, and helped to prepare Hirsch for his debates on race and intelligence with William Shockley. He then did postdoctoral research at Princeton University and the Massachusetts Institute of Technology before joining the faculty of Brandeis University as an assistant professor in 1987. He began working at Cold Spring Harbor Laboratory (CSHL) in 1991 as an associate professor, where he was subsequently named Professor in 1995 and Head of the Division of Neurogenetics in 2006. In 1997, he and James Watson founded Helicon Therapeutics, Inc., with the aim of creating a pharmaceutical drug to enhance human memory. Tully served as its acting Chief Science Officer until it merged with Dart Neuroscience in 2012. In 2007, he resigned his position at CSHL to become Chief Science Officer at Dart Neuroscience.

== Research ==
Tully is known for his research identifying genes that affect memory in the fruit fly species Drosophila melanogaster. In 1995, Tully and his CSHL colleague Jerry Yin made headlines when they genetically engineered a Drosophila fly that displayed the equivalent of a photographic memory. They did so by breeding flies with a mutated form of the CREB gene to produce many more activator proteins than it normally would, thereby allowing the flies to store more long-term memories. Through his company Helicon, Tully subsequently began working to develop a drug to raise levels of the CREB protein, in the hope that it would improve memory in humans. In 2004, Tully and his CSHL colleagues developed HT-0712, a drug that aims to improve memory in people with dementia. At the time, Tully suggested that it could also be used by healthy people to help them remember how to play a new musical instrument or speak a new language.
