= 2013 Washington, Illinois tornado =

Violent late-season EF4 tornado in Illinois

Coordinates: 40.622°N 89.5678°W

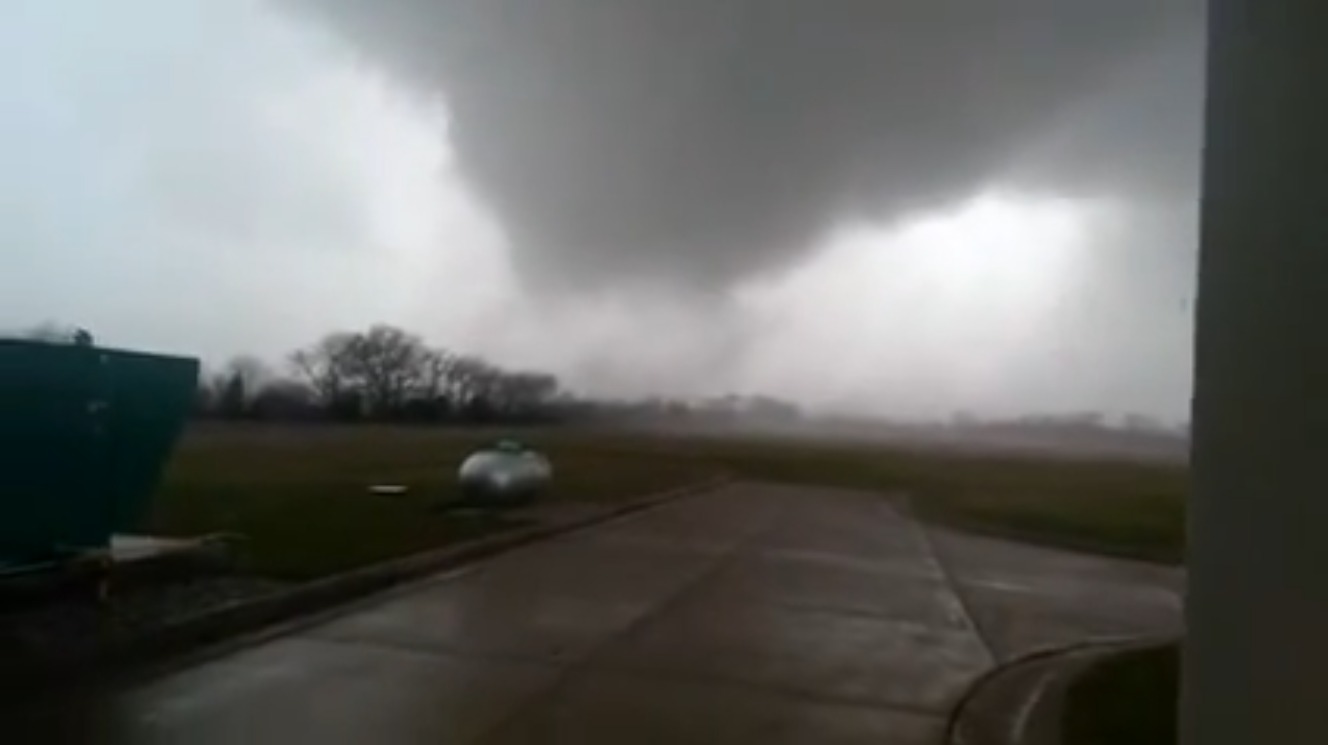
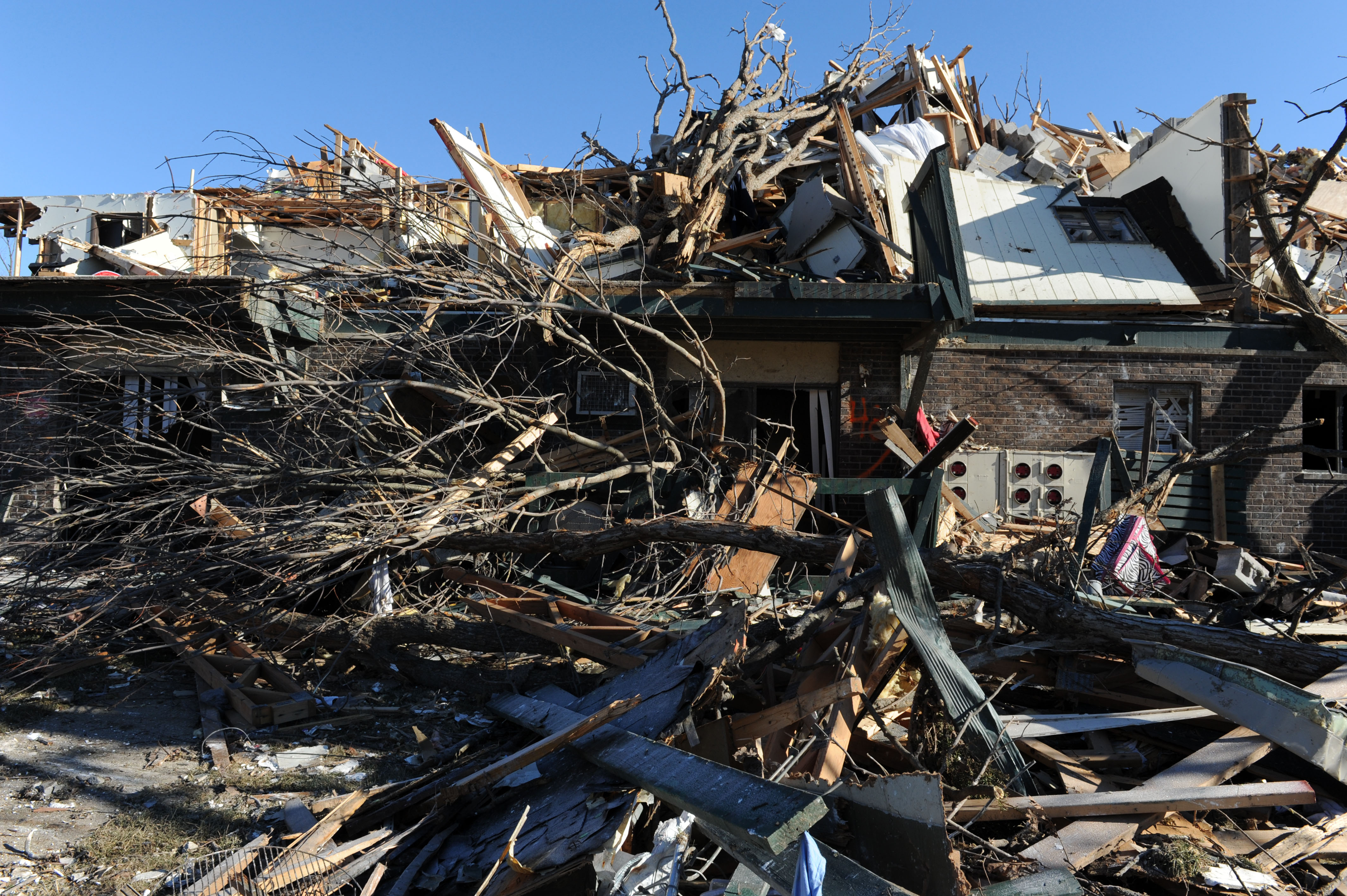
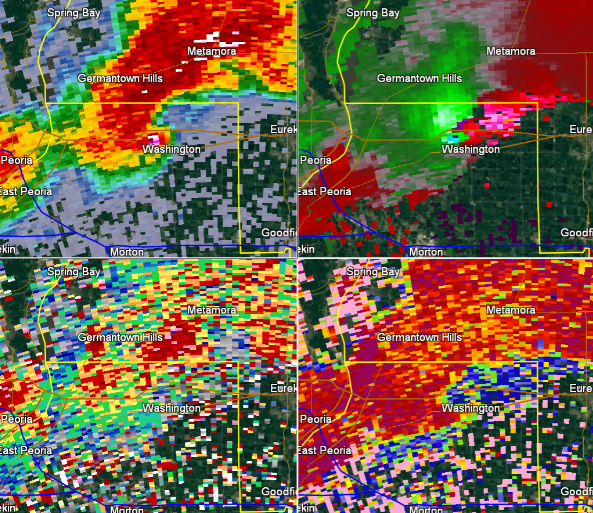
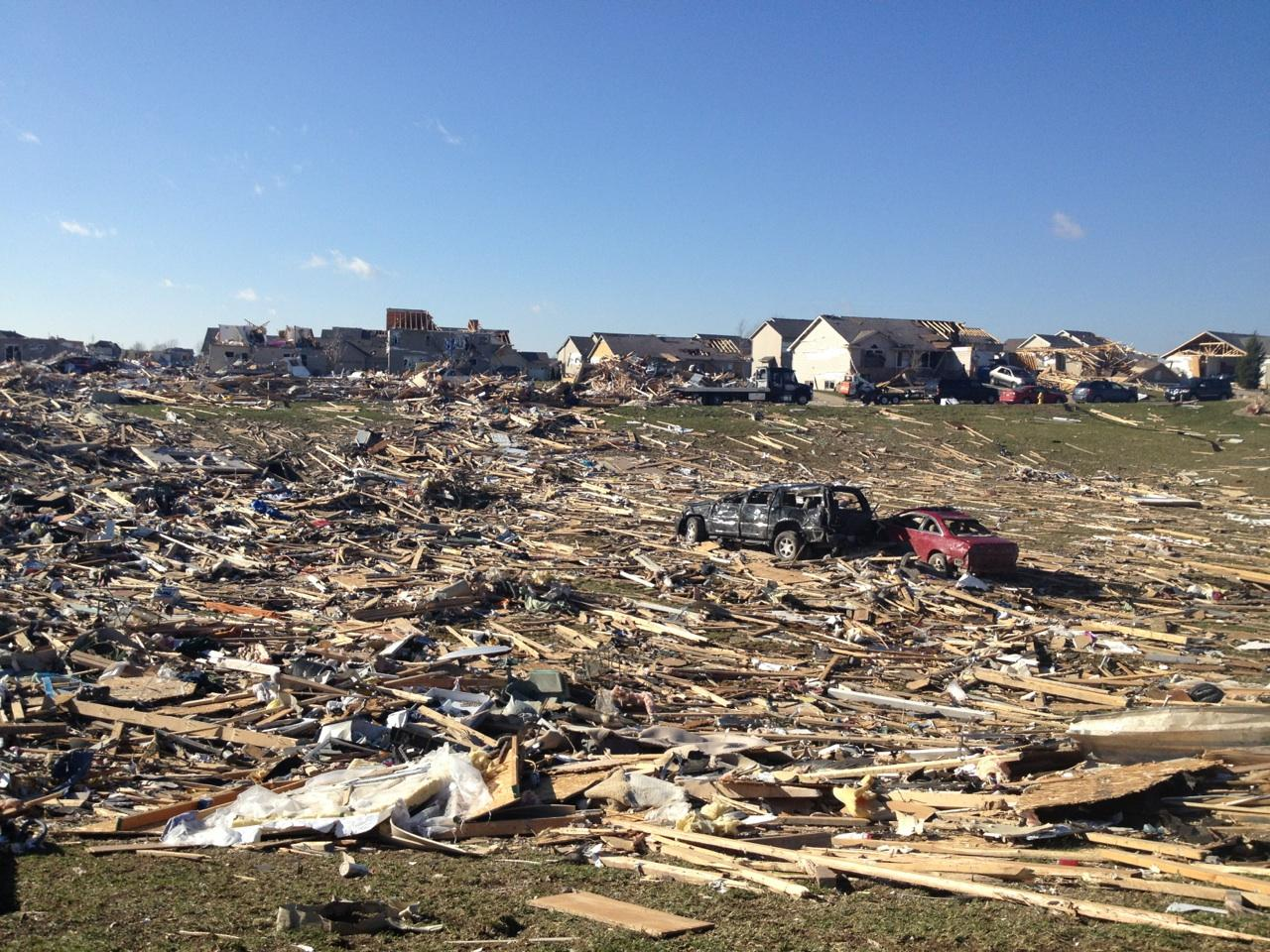
- Counterclockwise from top: The Washington tornado shortly after formation; Damage inflicted to the Georgetown Commons Apartment complex, Doppler weather radar imagery of the Washington, IL tornado, showing a debris ball on reflectivity with a deep correlation coefficient, showing a huge amount of debris being lofted high into the atmosphere. Debris strewn around in a heavily damaged neighborhood in Washington.

Meteorological history
- Formed: November 17, 2013, 10:59 a.m. CST (UTC−05:00)
- Dissipated: November 17, 2013, 11:47 a.m. CST (UTC−05:00)
- Duration: 48 minutes

EF4 tornado
- on the Enhanced Fujita scale
- Max width: 880 yards (0.50 mi; 0.80 km)
- Path length: 46.2 miles (74.4 km)
- Highest winds: 190 mph (310 km/h)

Overall effects
- Fatalities: 3
- Injuries: 125
- Damage: $935 million (2013 USD)
- Areas affected: East Peoria, Washington, Roanoke, Benson, Minonk, Dana, Long Point, Illinois, US
- Part of the Tornado outbreak of November 17, 2013 and tornadoes of 2013

In the late morning hours of Sunday, November 17, 2013, a powerful and devastating tornado tracked through central Illinois, United States, inflicting catastrophic damage to the city of Washington and several farmsteads in the rural areas past the city. The tornado resulted in three fatalities and injured 125 people. This tornado was one of the two violent tornadoes in the tornado outbreak of November 17, 2013, and was the strongest, costliest, and longest-tracked tornado. It was the deadliest tornado of the outbreak, tied with another intense tornado that went through Brookport, Illinois. The tornado was one of the nine violent tornadoes of the below-average yet destructive year of 2013.

The intense supercell responsible for the tornado first produced at 10:59 a.m. CST 2.5 miles (4.0 km) east of North Pekin; The tornado crossed I-474, intensifying to EF2 strength. The tornado crossed I-74, strengthening to EF3 intensity; couple of homes suffered severe damage north of the interstate. The tornado fluctuated between EF2 and EF3 strength as the tornado passed near East Peoria. As the tornado entered Washington, the tornado became violent, leveling some homes in a subdivision at the edge of the city. The tornado continued northeast, destroying an apartment complex and leveling an auto parts store before intensifying to a peak intensity of 190 mph (310 km/h). Numerous well-built homes were demolished, and rows of houses were leveled and swept away. The tornado maintained a high-end EF4 intensity through Washington. The tornado maintained its intensity after leaving the city, obliterating farmsteads north of Washington. Eventually, the tornado weakened upon exiting Tazewell County, fluctuating between EF2 and EF3 strength; some homes either received minor to significant damage as the tornado passed near the towns of Roanoke, Minonk, and Dana. The tornado dissipated 48 minutes after touching down east of Long Point at 11:47 a.m. CST, covering a path length of approximately 46.2 miles (74.4 km) and reaching a maximum peak width of 0.5 miles (880 yd; 0.80 km).

The tornado caused $935 million (2013 USD) in damages ($1.23 billion adjusted for inflation); it caused $800 million in damage in Washington alone. The tornado was also the strongest to occur in November in the state of Illinois since at least 1950. Following the tornado, the city of Washington and other communities devastated by the tornado outbreak received massive amount of aid from charity organizations. Additionally, a controversy began as Federal Emergency Management Agency (FEMA) declined federal aid to the state of Illinois after the tornado outbreak, leading to outrage from the mayor of Washington and other state officials.

== Meteorological setup ==
Based on computer models, the Storm Prediction Center (SPC) began to assess the possibility of a widespread severe weather event for November 17 as early as November 12, though too much uncertainty existed at the time to delineate the probability and scale of the event. As models gained a more accurate consensus, the SPC later anticipated substantial increase in atmospheric instability along the periphery of a potential cold front, indicating the risk of damaging wind gusts and tornadoes. Additional confidence over the next 24 hours resulted in a substantial expanding of this risk area into the lower Great Lakes on November 14, valid for Day 4. The overlap of increasing moisture in the atmosphere, wind shear, and high levels of CAPE were expected to contribute to the possible severe weather. The development of supercells and later squall lines was anticipated and was also expected to impact the Mid-Atlantic states. At around midday on November 15, the SPC issued a slight risk for severe weather for the 16th in regions concentrated primarily around Iowa and Missouri, forecasting the possibility of storms particularly during the evening to overnight hours of November 16. The system associated with those storms was to track eastward and strengthen; as a result, the SPC also issued a Day 3 slight risk earlier on November 15 for a large swath of the Eastern United States in effect for November 17. The slight risk included a 30% chance of severe thunderstorm activity for an area concentrated on Indiana and Ohio.

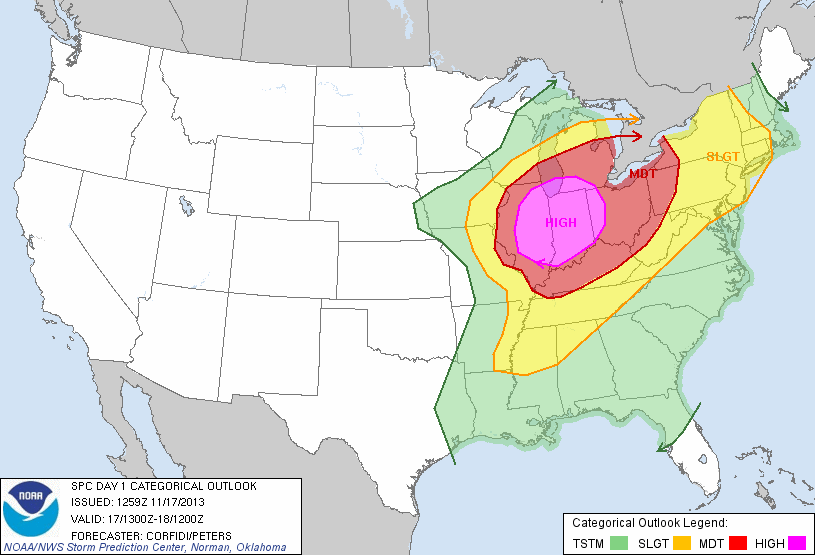

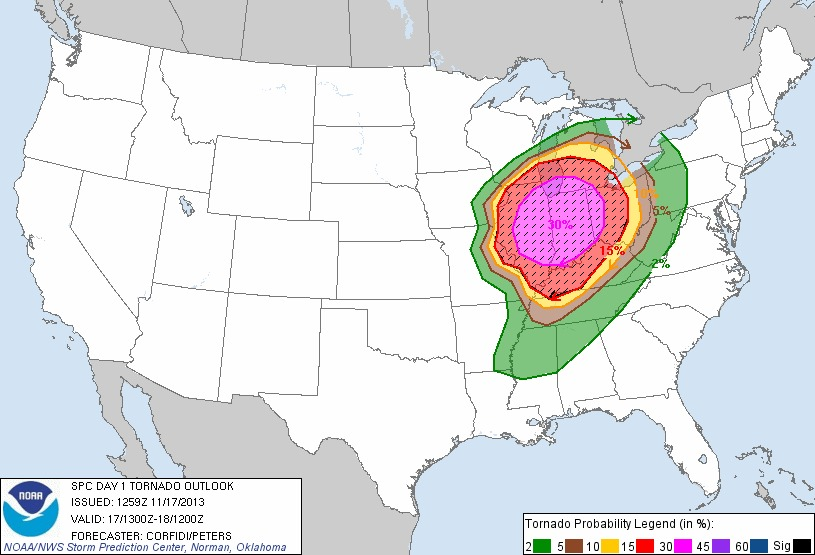
SPC outlooks issued at 1303z. A tornado-driven high risk was issued for Ohio Valley and most of Hoosier Alley.

With the overall upper-level system expected to track eastward across the High Plains on November 17, the SPC issued a slight risk for severe thunderstorm activity for an area surrounding the confluence of the Mississippi and Missouri rivers, valid for the early morning of the day on November 17. Model data indicated the weakening of the capping inversion coinciding with increasing instability and wind shear, which would lead to the enhanced potential for storms and tornadoes as the night progressed and the low-level jet strengthened. This overnight severe weather largely failed to develop, leading to only a very few isolated reports. However, at 0600 UTC on November 17, the SPC upgraded to a high risk for severe weather for regions of Illinois, Indiana, southwestern Michigan, and western Ohio, in anticipation of conditions becoming increasingly favorable for a significant tornado outbreak; this area of high risk was expanded at 1300 UTC to encompass a roughly circular region of the United States Midwest containing nearly 19 million people. Those same regions were listed as having at least a 30% chance of tornadoes, coupled with a 45% chance for wind. The issuance of a high-risk zone reflected the anticipation of an intense upper-level trough and a strong mid-level jet stream producing highly conducive conditions for the development and prolonging of severe weather.

=== Washington, Illinois, supercell ===
Confirmed tornadoes by Enhanced Fujita rating
EFU	EF0	EF1	EF2	EF3	EF4	EF5	Total
0	1	0	3	0	1	0	5

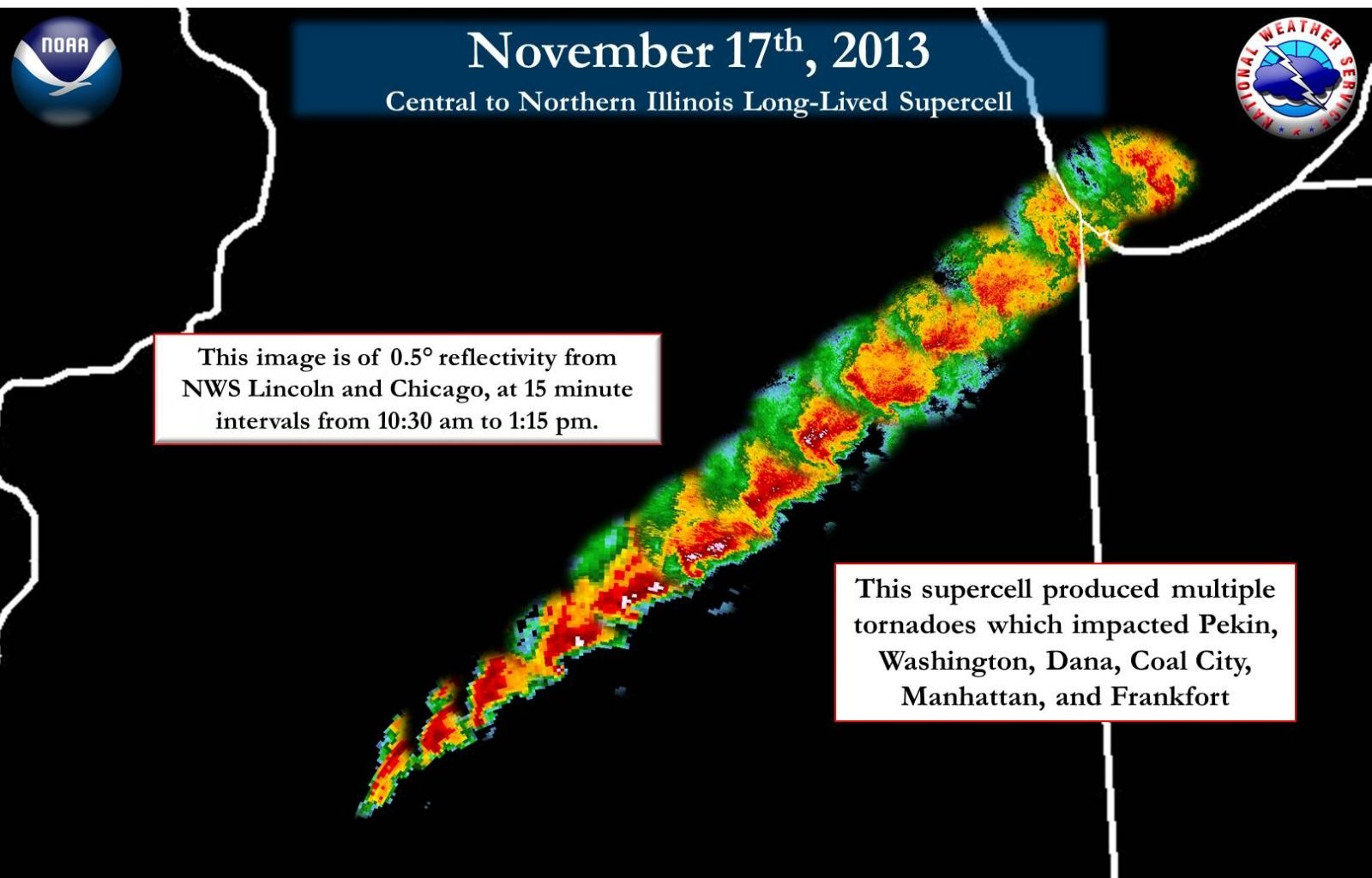

Timelapse loop of the Washington supercell progressing from Tazewell County to Lake Michigan where the supercell gets absorbed by the squall line.

This long-tracked supercell produced five tornadoes near Pekin, Washington, Dana, Coal City, Manhattan, and Frankfort, the strongest and longest-tracked being the Washington, Illinois, tornado.

The supercell developed a mesocyclone and maintained it for over 50 miles (80 km). Then, at 10:52 am CDT, the supercell produced a strong but short-lived EF2 tornado over Pekin. The tornado touched down north of State Highway 9, mainly uprooting trees and downing power lines before it crossed the Illinois River. The tornado made it across the river into the residential side of Pekin. It rapidly strengthened to mid-range EF2 intensity; roofs were ripped off of brick homes, and an apartment complex suffered significant roof damage. Afterward, it weakened down, causing EF0-EF1 damage to trees and infrastructures before dissipating. The tornado was on the ground for two minutes and reached a width of 100 yd (91 m); no one died, but the tornado caused ten injuries and $45 million in property damage. After the dissipation of the Pekin tornado, a few minutes later, the Washington tornado touched down.

After the Washington tornado dissipated, the supercell recycled again and produced another tornado near Coal City at 12:22 pm CDT. The tornado traveled northeast, uprooting several softwood trees at EF0 intensity. It crossed East Reed Road where a home sustained minor roof damage at EF1 strength; a nearby metal building also received some damage to its roof and exterior walls. The tornado crossed Berta Road; along this road, it intensified to an EF2 as a home suffered significant damage. Crossing East Spring Road, the tornado entered a subdivision of homes at mid-range EF2 strength; several homes in this subdivision either sustained partial roof loss or the second story walls of the home collapsed. Along State Route 113, many businesses suffered considerable damage. An RV dealership had numerous vehicles damaged and flipped over; a two-story home had its roof ripped away and portions of the walls collapsed; a model home was shifted off its foundation; and a manufactured home lost its roof. As the tornado moved northeast approaching I-55, it caused widespread tree damage that occurred near the road. The tornado lifted northwest of Symerton at 12:33 pm CDT. The tornado traveled 12.4 miles (20.0 km) and had estimated peak wind speeds of 125 mph (201 km/h), reaching a peak width of 200 yd (180 m) and inflicting $12.75 million in damages. At least 100 homes and businesses were damaged and four injuries were reported by the tornado.

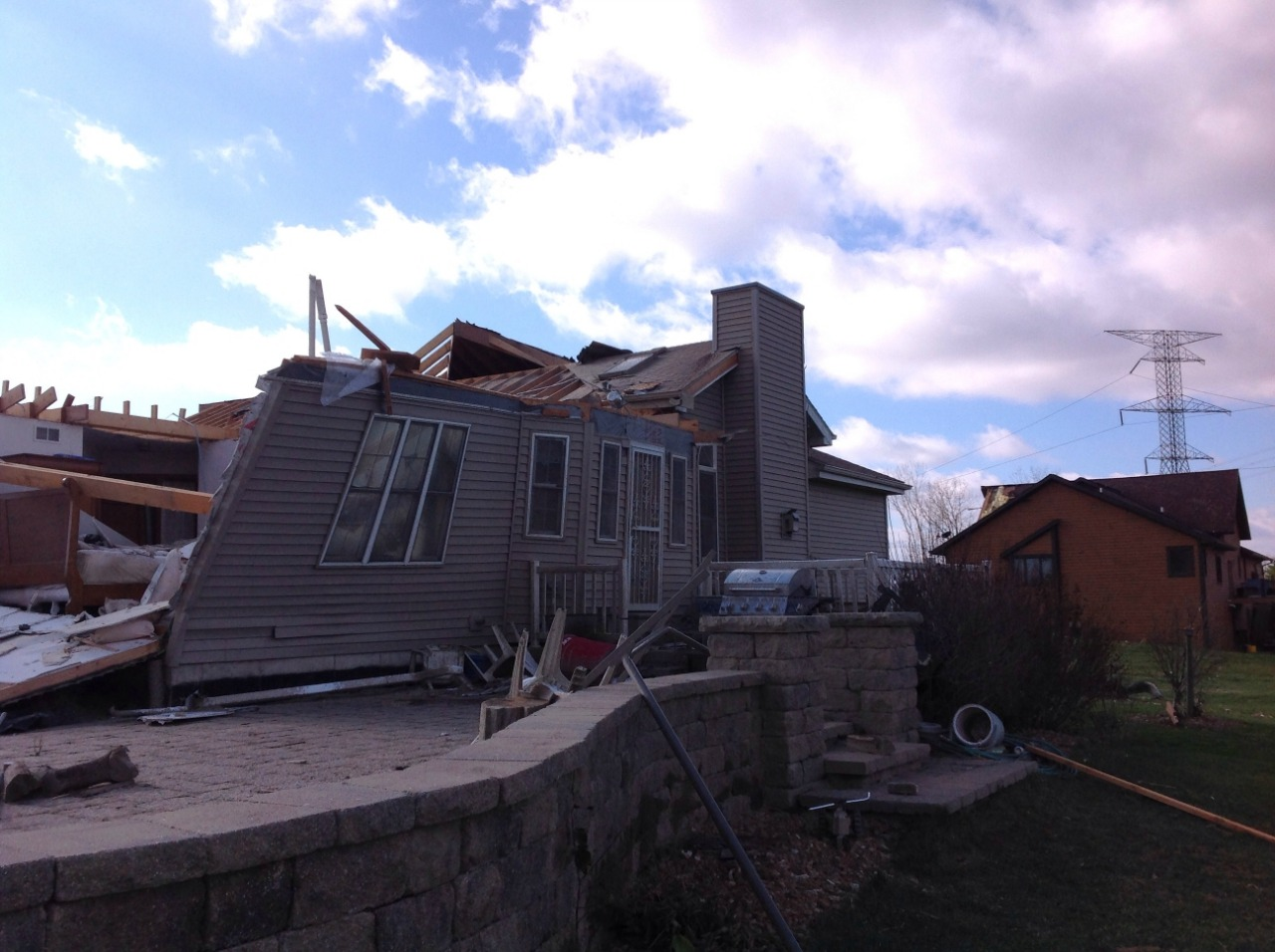
Significant damage done to a home southeast of Manhattan, Illinois

The supercell produced its final tornado at 12:42 pm CDT southeast of Manhattan. Upon touching down, the tornado rapidly intensified to mid-range EF2 strength. A home on West Burns Road sustained major roof loss, with walls partially collapsing. On South Schoolhouse Road, four high-tension power line towers were bent, and near West Draffle Road, two houses and a barn received heavy damage, with large portions of their roofs sheared away. The tornado weakened to high-end EF1 intensity, impacting a farm and causing significant roof damage. The tornado lifted at 12:48 pm CDT after traveling 5.4 miles (8.7 km) with a peak width of 200 yards (0.18 km). The tornado caused $750,000 in damages and no casualties were reported. The tornado had estimated peak winds of 125 miles per hour (201 km/h). The supercell was eventually absorbed by a squall line and dissipated over Lake Michigan.

== Tornado summary ==
=== Formation in Tazewell County ===
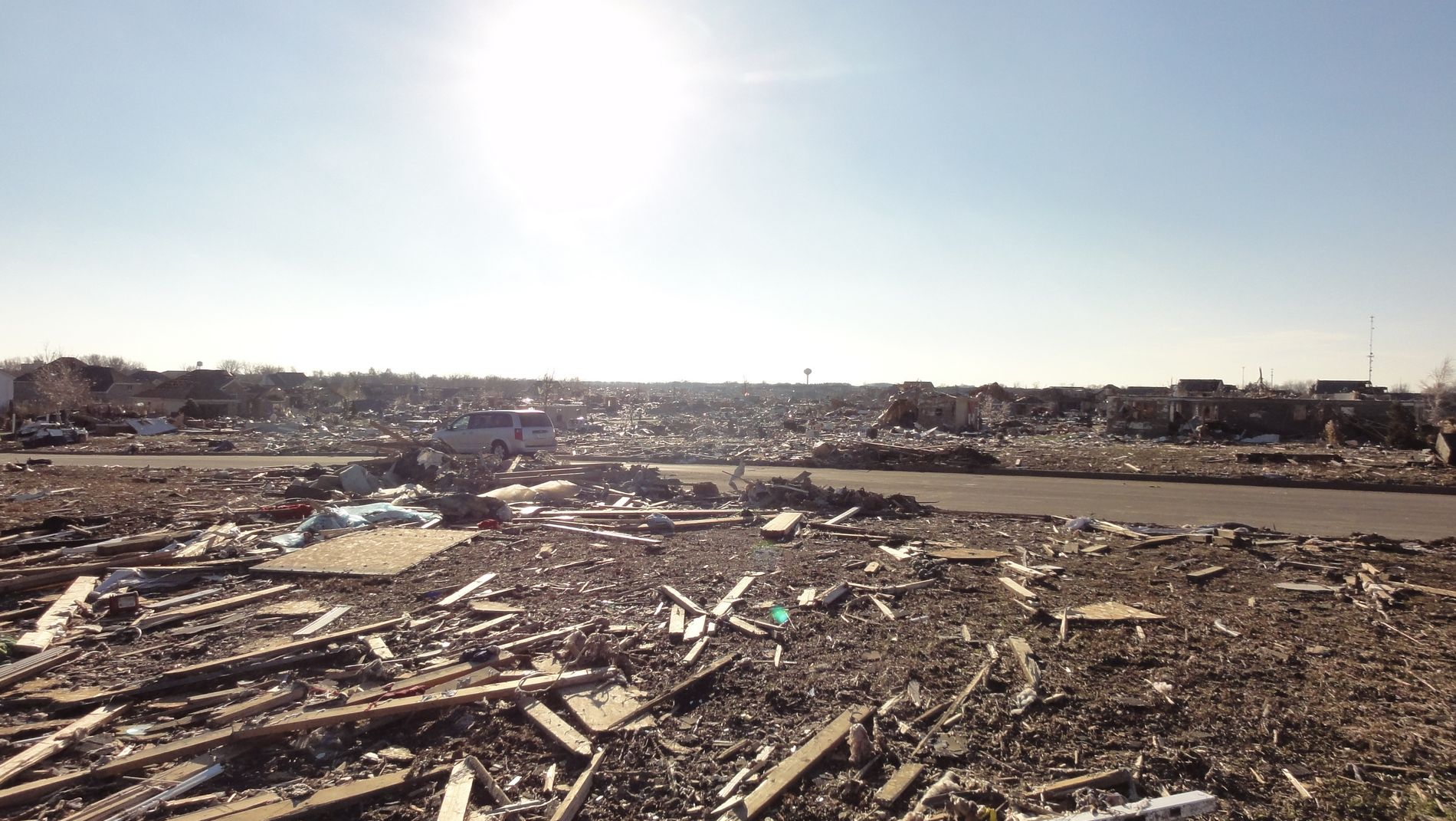
Catastrophic damage in a neighborhood in Washington

The supercell produced the tornado at 10:59 a.m. CST, causing minor roof damage to homes paralleling West Muller Road. After crossing the road, the tornado quickly intensified to high-end EF1 strength, uprooting multiple trees and causing the bedroom walls of a home to collapse due to flying debris from a roof, compromising the structure. The tornado then crossed I-474 and moved onto Harris Road, causing light roof damage to homes along the road. The tornado abruptly intensified to high-end EF2 strength, snapping power poles and causing significant roof damage to homes on Marla Street. The tornado slightly weakened to mid-range EF2 intensity, with estimated wind speeds up to 120 mph (190 km/h), snapping power poles and continuing to cause significant roof damage to homes along Pinecrest Drive. After crossing I-74, the tornado uprooted and snapped many trees. It then intensified to mid-range EF3 intensity with wind speeds up to 150 mph (241 km/h), causing the roof of a house to collapse into itself. The tornado completely leveled a home along Helene Court. One house suffered major damage as the upstairs exterior walls collapsed, along with some of the interior walls. A large debris field were left on the ground as the tornado continued to travel northeast at around 55 mph (89 km/h).

Soon, the tornado significantly weakened to mid-range EF2 strength, continuing to uproot trees and strip away roofs from homes along Pleasant Hill Road before quickly strengthening to high-end EF2 intensity as a trailer was destroyed. A car was rolled into a home along Veterans Road, and significant roof damage was noted as the tornado continued to snap trees. The tornado suddenly intensified back to mid-range EF3 strength, almost completely leveling a well-built home at 150 mph (240 km/h). Another home suffered major roof damage and loss of exterior walls, and the garage of a home was completely blown away along Farmdale Road. Intense tree damage was also noted in this area, with a large debris field downstream from the location. The tornado briefly weakened back down to EF2, causing major roof damage, before strengthening back to low-end EF3 as multiple homes along School Road lost their exterior walls, and an electrical transmission tower was completely crumpled by the tornado. Numerous trees in and around Farm Creek were snapped and uprooted. A 51-year-old man was killed in this area. Around the same time, the National Weather Service at Lincoln issued a particularly dangerous situation tornado warning for Tazewell County and Woodford County at 11:06 a.m. CST. Overall, the tornado caused $110 million in damages in East Peoria.

The tornado intensified to low-end EF4 strength as it entered the city of Washington, leveling and partially sweeping away a couple of homes along English Oak Street in the Woodridge Trace subdivision at 170 mph (270 km/h). Nearby homes suffered major structural damage; an 84-year-old man suffered severe injuries here and later died from his injuries. The tornado intensified further to mid-range EF4 strength as it struck the Georgetown Commons apartment complex along Georgetown Road; the top two stories were destroyed, and nearby apartment buildings suffered major roof damage. A truck in the parking lot was lifted and wrapped around a tree. The sixteen apartment buildings and a nearby restaurant that also sustained heavy damage were torn down. The tornado directly struck the Hillcrest Golf Course, which was closed for two years following the tornado. A building on the course property was leveled as the tornado shredded trees and tore off the carpeting on the minigolf course.

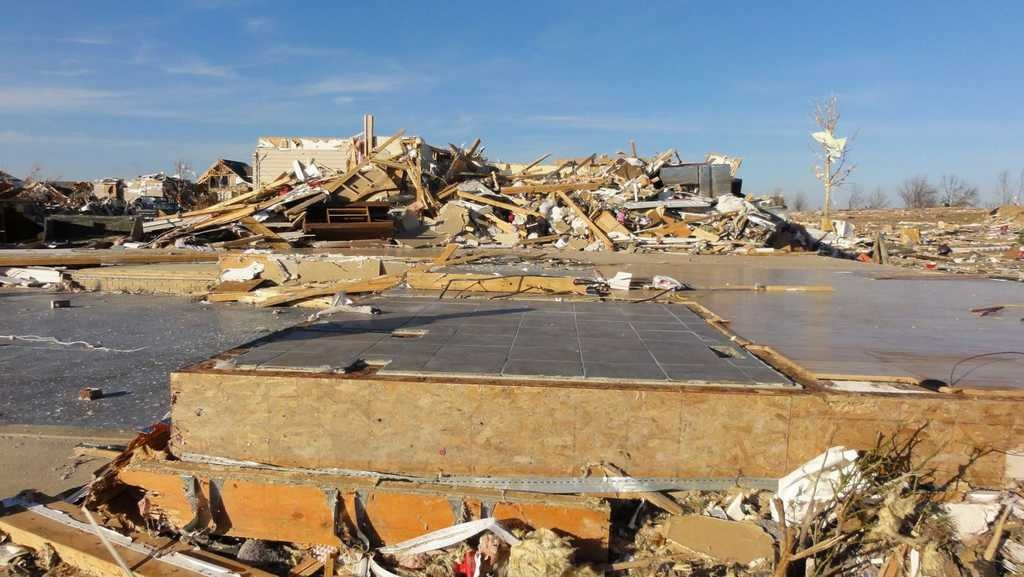
A home in Washington that was completely swept away at high-end EF4 strength

The tornado crossed Washington Road into Washington Estates, sustaining estimated wind speeds of 180 mph (290 km/h). An Advance Auto Parts store alongside Washington Road was leveled by the tornado; multiple employees were inside when the building was flattened, but no one was injured. On Fayette Avenue, the tornado caused destructive damage to numerous homes at EF4 intensity, killing an 82-year-old woman who initially survived but died from her injuries a week later. The tornado slightly weakened to low-end EF4 strength alongside Elgin Avenue; some homes on Flossmoor Avenue were swept away. On the Trail Edge subdivision, the tornado abruptly intensified to high-end EF4 strength with estimated wind speeds up to 190 mph (310 km/h). The most violent damage to occur from the tornado happened alongside Mackenzie Street, where a row of well-constructed homes was completely obliterated and all debris was swept away, leaving only bare foundations; along Bishops Court, another home was demolished and had all debris swept clean from the foundation and wind-rowed. On Kingsbury Road, Our Savior Lutheran Church received considerable damage. All the windows were blown out, and the roof sustained moderate damage; the doors to the walkout basement were ripped away, and the church's garage was demolished. A $50 bill from Washington was found 100 miles (160 km) away in Minooka.

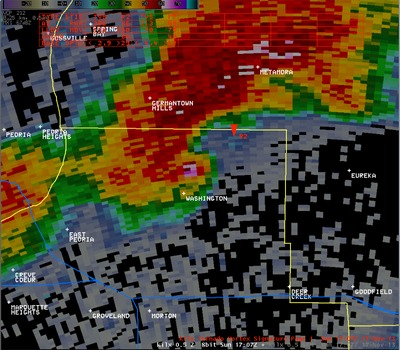
NEXRAD radar showing the tornado north of Washington with debris ball evident on reflectivity

Entering Devonshire Estates, the tornado maintained high-end EF4 intensity, leveling or sweeping away another row of homes on Coventry Drive while traveling northeast at around 65 miles per hour (105 km/h). Four rows of homes on Holborn Court were leveled; debris was partially swept off of their foundations. Along Westminster Drive, another row of homes was leveled and either partially swept away or completely swept away from their foundations, and trees were shredded and debarked. Around the same time, at 11:07 a.m. CST, a debris ball appeared on Doppler radar north of Washington accompanied by an intense velocity couplet. The tornado continued to travel northeast, leveling or sweeping away more homes from their foundations before leaving the city proper of Washington after crossing West Cruger Road.

The tornado scattered debris over the farmlands north of the road and carved deep spirals into the soils called cycloidal marks. A farmstead on North Main Street was destroyed, and debris was partially swept off its foundation. Still maintaining 190 mph (310 km/h) winds, the tornado crossed Duluth Lane, where an entire farmstead was destroyed: the farmhouse was leveled and swept away, some outbuildings on the farmstead were destroyed and reduced down to their foundations, and some grain bins lost their tops. Around this time, the National Weather Service issued another particularly dangerous situation tornado warning for northeast Tazewell, most of Woodford and the southern fringes of Marshall counties at 11:12 a.m. CST. The tornado eventually left Tazewell County, causing $800 million in damage in the city of Washington and $910 million in damage in the county. Three people were killed and another 121 injured.

=== Weakening phase through Woodford, LaSalle, and Livingston County ===
The tornado weakened to EF3 intensity as an old, poorly built farmhouse along Mennonite Road was leveled by the tornado alongside. It further weakened to mid-range EF2, causing substantial damage to the roof of a home on County Road 1300 southeast of Metamora. The tornado made a close approach to the Parsons Company Inc. west of Roanoke, which was destroyed by another violent tornado nine years earlier, ultimately missing the plant by a few hundred yards. Just north of the plant, the tornado intensified to high-end EF2 with estimated wind speeds of 135 mph (217 km/h); a farmhouse lost all of its exterior walls along County Road 1500, and an outbuilding had all of its walls collapse. The tornado maintained EF2 intensity and continued northeast, snapping multiple wooden power poles at low-end EF2 strength. Two homes north of Roanoke sustained substantial damage; one had lost its exterior walls, destroyed at near EF3 intensity, while the other lost most of its roof. On Highway 117 northwest of Benson, the tornado restrengthened to EF3 intensity, causing a farmhouse to lose its exterior walls. As the tornado traveled further northeast, a cell phone tower was crumpled and a home was shifted off of its foundation at high-end EF2 intensity; a well-built home had its roof ripped off on County Road 2300; and trees in the area were snapped and uprooted.

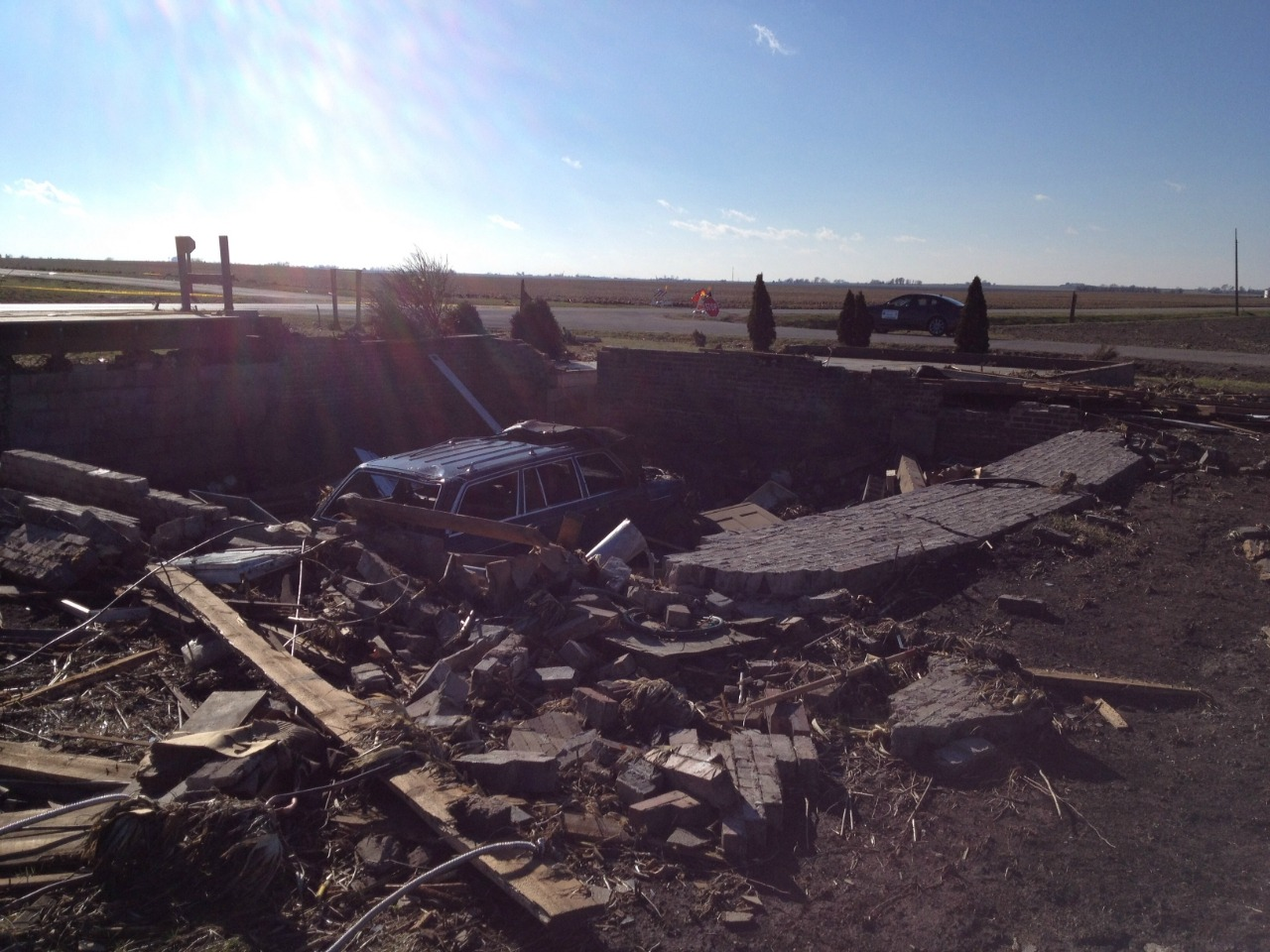
A poorly constructed home was completely swept away by the tornado at low-end EF3 intensity, with winds up to 145 miles per hour (233 km/h) estimated here.

As the tornado approached I-39, it crossed Highway 117, where it regained EF3 intensity. A poorly constructed home was swept away, the station wagon in the garage was lofted and dropped into the basement, and a nearby free-standing pole collapsed. The tornado crossed I-39 and directly impacted the Road Ranger truck stop northwest of Minonk, overturning several semi-trucks and damaging hundreds of other vehicles; there were no fatalities but three truck drivers were injured. The tornado slightly weakened to high-end EF2, causing a home to lose its roof and the wall to partially collapse. Cars were displaced, a cell tower was completely crumpled, and trees and power poles were snapped along Base Road before the tornado left Woodford county. The tornado caused $25 million in damages and four injuries.

The tornado maintained EF2 intensity as it stripped away a large portion of a home's roof along East 7th Road. Small outbuildings were destroyed and several power poles were snapped. 0.5 miles (0.80 km) west of Dana, a machinery shed was destroyed as the tornado weakened to EF1 strength. South of Long Point, the tornado restrengthened back to EF2 intensity, demolishing several outbuildings and snapping numerous power poles. The tornado produced a satellite tornado, rated an EFU due to being in open fields, and it traveled for 2.6 miles (4.2 km). The main tornado caused extensive tree damage; a large shed containing a fire engine was destroyed, the fire engine tipping onto its side. Eventually, the tornado dissipated a few miles east of Long Point. The tornado was on the ground for 46.2 miles (74.4 km) and had a peak width of 0.5 miles (880 yd; 0.80 km).

== Impacts ==
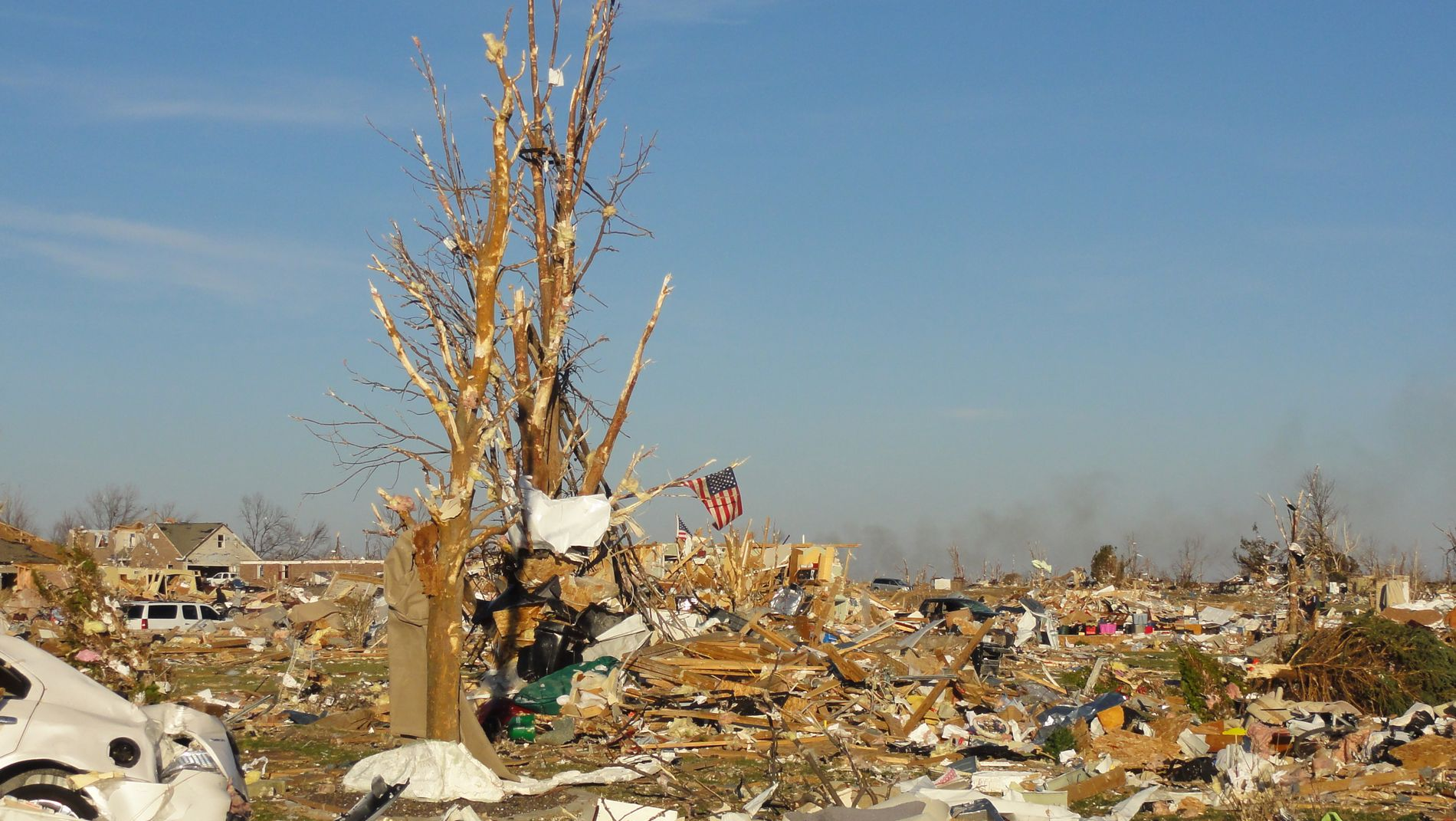
The U.S. flag hanging off a debarked tree surrounded by major damages from the tornado

The tornado caused $935 million in damage, $800 million of that in Washington and another $110 million in East Peoria. Final estimates, revised upwards twice, revealed that 1,484 homes were damaged or destroyed; in addition, multiple businesses were destroyed in Washington and East Peoria. Though the tornado tracked through rural areas in Woodford County, it inflicted $25 million in damage, and 24 homes were affected, seven of those were destroyed. Thousands of residents were left homeless and 23,000 people lost power.

Confirmed fatalities from Washington, IL tornado
Name	Age	County	Ref.
Charles Koonce	84	Tazewell	
Rosamund Allison	82	Tazewell	
Steve Neubauer	51	Tazewell	

Three people died from the tornado, and 125 more were injured. In Peoria, the OSF Saint Francis Medical Center and Medical Methodist Center treated dozens of patients, but none has been confirmed to be severe. On December 5, the Mayor of Washington, Illinois, Gary Manier, revealed that the city had an estimated 47% loss in property tax value due to the thousands of homes damaged or destroyed by the tornado. Even though the tornado went through densely populated neighborhoods, only three people died. National Weather Service forecasters attributed the low death toll to the already highly publicized threat of a tornado outbreak; people being away from their homes, either at church or shopping, on a Sunday morning; the local prevalence of basements or storm shelters for those at home; and increased dissemination of weather warnings.

=== Case Study ===
On February 1, 2024, a study published by American Meteorological Society studied the cycloidal marks left behind by the tornado after tracking through the city of Washington in the rural areas. Areas of the cycloidal marks were split up into ten sections. The loop dimensions of each sections were measured and windspeeds were calculated. Then, the average estimated windspeeds for each of the loops were calculated to obtain the estimated wind speed for that section of the track. The study found that the tornado had an average estimated windspeeds, at minimum, of 184 mph (296 km/h), and maximum windspeeds of 219 mph (352 km/h). The area with the highest winds ranged from 205–231 mph (330–372 km/h), with limitations of the loop width and height measurements. The 219 mph (352 km/h) wind estimated occurred immediately after the tornado exited the final residential neighborhood in Washington, where damage survey found estimated windspeeds of 190 mph (310 km/h), though areas further down the track were rated less due to the limited number of structures that were impacted in the rural area.

== Aftermath ==
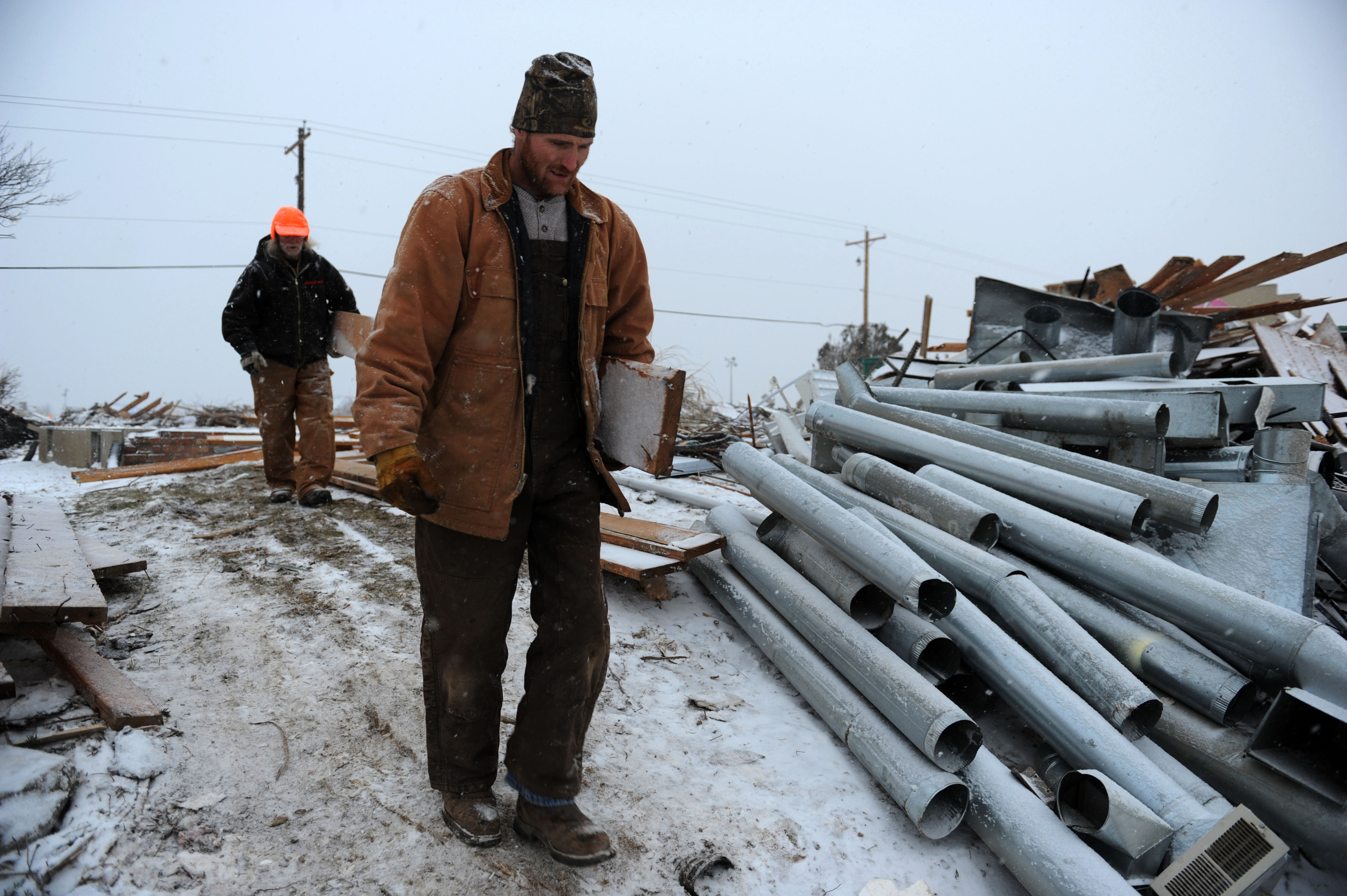
William Winchell (right) and John Heath helping the clean-up effort during snowfall

=== Response ===
State politicians including governor Pat Quinn and senators Dick Durbin and Mark Kirk visited Washington. President Barack Obama authorized disaster funding for 15 counties in Illinois, while Governor Quinn declared seven counties as disaster areas. The Illinois National Guard dispatched ten firefighters and three vehicles to assist in searching for survivors from the tornado, with reports about people being trapped under rubble. On November 23, Governor Quinn announced the opening of a Multi-Agency Resource Center in Washington so survivors affected by the tornado could have easier access to relief services from 20 state and local agencies, and the Department of Insurance helped cover insurance issues.

Ten 182nd Airlift Wing firefighters from the Illinois Air National Guard were dispatched to the city, searching through a total of 36 leveled structures, clearing debris, and shutting off six gas lines. The American Red Cross held a relief drive in Annawan to help victims from the Washington tornado, accepting cash donations and supplies like bottled water; volunteers also helped with the cleaning effort. The city of Washington was placed under a 6 p.m. curfew for a week. Army Reserve soldiers from the 724th Transportation Company, stationed at Bartonville, Illinois, came to assist after the Fire Chief of Washington requested help to set up blockades that lead into and out of the city; the soldiers set up blockades at four locations around Washington, using semi-trucks and Humvees. The team of soldiers stayed to support law enforcement until civil services arrived.

The Salvation Army donated over 20,000 supplies to communities in Central Illinois and Eastern Iowa, and over 100 people received emotional and spiritual care. Over 500 volunteers from All Hands and Hearts visited Washington, Illinois to help with debris removal despite the cold temperature from November to December 2013. Rock to the Rescue, a non-profit organization, raised more than $400,000 in a benefit concert in Bloomington for affected communities. Six days after the tornado passed, a caravan of fire trucks and ambulances from all around central Illinois waited to welcome the football team Washington Panthers, who were returning from the Illinois 5A state football semifinals. The motorcade carrying the team drove along Main Street, with dozens of residents lining up on the sideline to cheer and support the team. One week after the tornado struck, baseball player Jim Thome—a Peoria native—donated $100,000 to tornado relief for Washington.

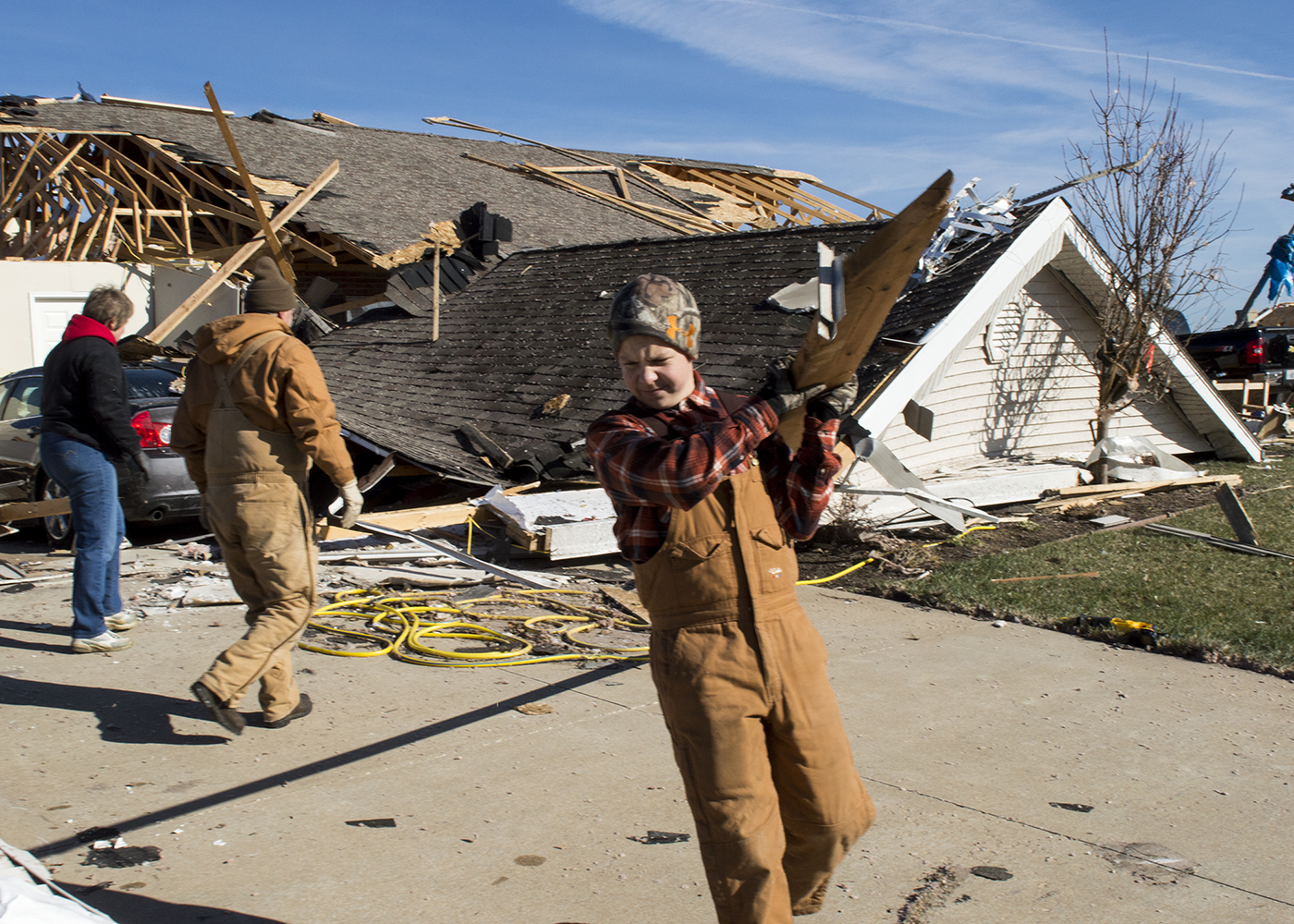
The Occupational Safety and Health Administration's Peoria Area Office in Washington, clearing debris and talking to residents on how to protect themselves from health hazards.

Operation BBQ Relief spent over six days in Washington, making over 25,600 meals for the victims of the tornado. The Washington Tornado Relief Fund, later renamed the Washington Illinois Area and the Washington Community Foundation, was created in the wake of the tornado to benefit the residents of the city through assistance to local charities and governmental entities. Samaritan's Purse dispatched a disaster relief unit onto Washington the day after the tornado, establishing a base in Morton, Illinois; two days later, a total of 854 volunteers worked on clearing debris and tarping roofs that were damaged. Peoria Brick Company offered hundreds of red Washington Strong brick free of charge to residents who lost their homes, generating $2,570 that was later donated to Washington Illinois Area Foundation tornado relief, with the bricks valued at $7,000.

Reach Out Worldwide came to Washington to help with the clean-up effort, assisting a power company in cutting down an old power pole and removing tree debris from their yard, they cleared out trees and power poles off of roads and lands and cutting them. Immediately after the tornado, students from Illinois State University set up a donation drive to send supplies like bottled water and money to devastated communities in Central Illinois. On December 9, 50 students from the university traveled to Washington to help with the tornado cleanup. McCormick Foundation partnered with the Chicago Tribune, WGN-TV, and WGN radio to create the Illinois Tornado Relief Effort campaign; 7,200 people donated more than $880,000, which with matching funds from the foundation and donated expenses was boosted to $1.1 million. The funds were granted to five non-profits in communities hardest hit by the tornadoes, including Washington.

=== FEMA aid refusal controversy ===
On December 19, 2013, the Illinois Emergency Management Agency requested $6.1 million in federal assistance for the local governments and electrical cooperative in the nine counties that were affected by the tornadoes of November 17. The Federal Emergency Management Agency (FEMA) responded on January 9, 2014, stating how the devastation in Washington was not "severe" enough to merit federal help. Governor Quinn and U.S. senators Dick Durbin and Mark Kirk voiced their disappointment in the decision.

On February 6, 2014, the Illinois Emergency Management Agency appealed the denial of aid, citing $21.4 million in disaster-related expenses for the local governments in the nine counties that it believed were eligible for 75% reimbursements. On March 3, 2014, FEMA denied an application from the mayor of Washington, Gary Manier, for $26 million in aid. In a press conference, Manier told reporters,

"The federal government has failed us. The FEMA system is broken. ... Downstate Illinois doesn't have a chance of getting aid from the federal government."

— Gary Manier

FEMA told Manier and other state officials that debris cleanup occurring beyond three days after the tornado would not be paid for by the federal government. FEMA also ruled that the federal government was not required to pay for damages done to infrastructure by vehicles helping to clear the street. FEMA later stated Illinois's damage assessments on the tornadoes were not qualified for any federal payment. Manier blamed federal guidelines for the calculation of damages.

On March 4, 2014, the state appealed FEMA's denial; the appeal was conclusively rejected, and less than 12 hours later, on March 5, Pat Quinn visited the city of Washington to announce a $45 million state-funded tornado relief plan for the affected communities. Federal legislators promised to fix FEMA's formula—calculating the certain amount of damage cities need to sustain before they qualify for federal aid—but almost three years after the tornado happened, nothing had changed, and during that time period, the state of Illinois had to pay the recovery costs that FEMA would otherwise have covered.

=== Possible EF5 intensity ===
On January 23, 2025, Anthony W. Lyza with the National Severe Storms Laboratory along with Harold E. Brooks and Makenzie J. Kroca with the University of Oklahoma’s School of Meteorology published a paper to the American Meteorological Society, where they stated the tornado in Washington was an "EF5 candidate" and opined that the EF5 starting wind speed should be 190 mph (310 km/h) instead of 201 mph (323 km/h).

== Recovery ==
The weather did no favors in helping the recovery efforts. Through the rest of the month of November, it only got above 50 °F (10 °C) once, with the temperature getting down to a low 10 °F (−12 °C) on November 24 (20 °F [11 °C] below average) with snow being reported. What followed was one of the worst winters on record for Midwest since 1978, with nearby Peoria reporting a record 57.6 inches (146 cm) of snow through the winter and the state of Illinois as a whole having its 9th coldest winter on record. As a result of the harsh winter, little clean up were done four months after the tornado.

One in 20 homes rebuilt in Pekin, East Peoria, and Washington featured safe rooms with 18-inch (46 cm) reinforced concrete walls in the basement; there were more safe rooms than before the tornado. Six months after the tornado happened, over 650 building permits had been issued, but overall progress was slowed by the winter weather. Almost two years after the tornado, the Harry LaHood Park on Kingsbury Road on the Trail Edge subdivision was renovated; a new accessible restroom facility doubled as a tornado shelter capable of withstanding high-end EF4 winds. On September 22, 2015, the Community Spirit sculpture and plaza was unveiled on the south side of Five Points in Washington; the bronze sculpture, funded by private donations, was the centerpiece of a plaza featuring engraved messages referring to the tornado and rebuilding effort. By 2018, the Washington Foundation had disbursed nearly all of the funds it had been donated to support rebuilding efforts.

As of the 2020 United States census, Washington, Illinois, had a population of 16,071 people, an increase from 15,134 people in the 2010 census. Ten years after the tornado, the neighborhoods that were destroyed by the tornado had largely been rebuilt, though some former homesites remained empty lots.

=== Mental health impact ===
On October 14, 2014, United Way released a 24-page book titled Rebuilding Hope after a Natural Disaster: Pathways to Emotional Healing and Recovery", showing strategies on how to cope emotionally after a natural disaster. Over a year after the tornado, counselors saw an increase in domestic issues and alcohol abuse; adults who survived the tornado had trouble sleeping and concentrating, while some children were more fearful due to flashbacks from the tornado.

== See also ==
- List of F4 and EF4 tornadoes (2010–2019)
- Weather of 2013
- List of North American tornadoes and tornado outbreaks
- List of costliest tornadoes in the Americas
- List of disasters by cost
