= C25H31NO3 =

The molecular formula C_{25}H_{31}NO_{3} (molar mass: 393.52 g/mol, exact mass: 393.2304 u) may refer to:

- HT-0712, also known as IPL-455903
- Testosterone nicotinate
