= Denhart Bank Building =

- U.S. National Register of Historic Places
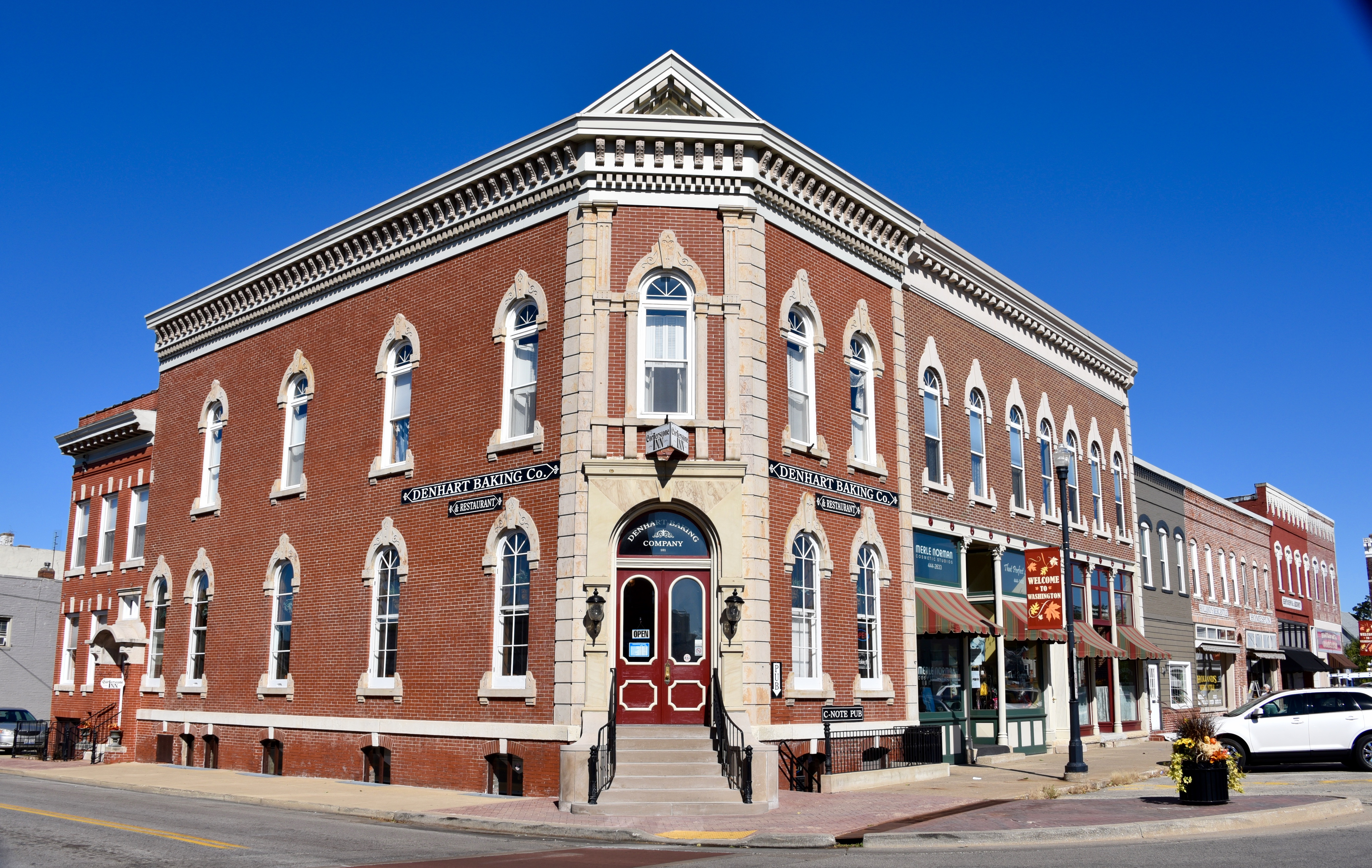

- Location within Illinois Location within the United States
- Location: 101 Washington Sq., Washington, Illinois
- Coordinates: 40°42′14″N 89°24′24″W
- Area: less than one acre
- Built: c. 1872
- Architectural style: Italianate
- NRHP reference No.: 05000874
- Added to NRHP: August 12, 2005

The Denhart Bank Building is a historic bank building located at 101 Washington Square in Washington, Illinois. Charles Anthony and Henry Denhart built the building for their bank, which began business in 1866, around 1872. The building has an Italianate design, a popular choice for the era, featuring tall windows with sandstone crowns, stone quoins, and an ornate framed entrance. The bank grew to not only be a prominent local bank but also to issue farm loans throughout the state and acquire holdings throughout the country. The partners dissolved their bank in 1885, though Denhart opened a new bank in the same building in 1886. Denhart's bank continued to use the building until it closed in 1930 following the 1929 stock market crash.

The building was added to the National Register of Historic Places on August 12, 2005.
