= Josep Call =

Spanish psychologist and primatologist

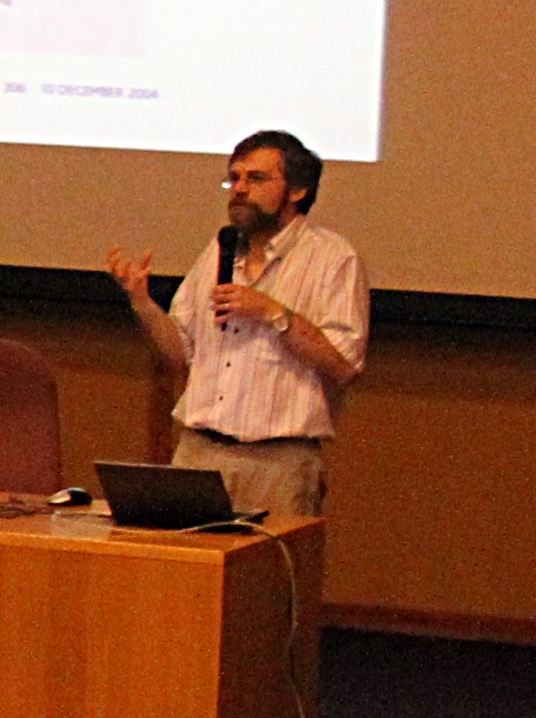
Call talking at a scientific conference in 2013

Josep Call is a Spanish comparative psychologist specializing in primate cognition.

== Early life and education ==
Call was born in Catalonia, Spain and received a BA (1990) from the Universitat Autonoma de Barcelona (Spain), and a master's degree (1995) and PhD (1997) from Emory University (United States), under the supervision of Prof. Michael Tomasello.

== Academic career ==
From 1997 to 1999 he was a lecturer at the School of Biological Sciences at the University of Liverpool (UK). Then in 1999 he moved to the Max Planck Institute for Evolutionary Anthropology in Leipzig, Germany where he is currently a senior scientist, co-founder and co-director of the Wolfgang Köhler Primate Research Centre. Call also holds the post of Professor in Evolutionary Origins of Mind at the University of St Andrews, where his focus is on technical and social-problem solving in animals. His work places special emphasis on the great apes or primatology.

=== Research ===
Among other topics, Call has worked to identify the unique cognitive and cultural processes that distinguish humans from their nearest primate relatives, the great apes. He has published two books and nearly two hundred research articles and book chapters on the cognition and behavior of apes and other animals. He is currently the editor of the Journal of Comparative Psychology and a member of the editorial board of several other academic journals.

== Honours ==
In 2013 Call was elected a Fellow of the American Psychological Association, and in March 2016 was elected a Corresponding Fellow of the Royal Society of Edinburgh In July 2019, he was elected a Fellow of the British Academy (FBA), the United Kingdom's national academy for the humanities and social sciences.

== Selected works ==
- Tomasello, M. & Call, J. (1997). Primate cognition. New York: Oxford University Press.
- Tomasello, M., Carpenter, M., Call, J., Behne, T. & Moll, H. (2005). Understanding and sharing intentions: The origins of cultural cognition. Behavioral and Brain Sciences, 28, 1-17.
- Nicholas J. Mulcahy; Josep Call (May 2006). "Apes Save Tools for Future Use". Science. 312 (5776): 1038–1040. Bibcode:2006Sci...312.1038M. doi:10.1126/science.1125456. PMID 16709782. S2CID 8468216.
- Call, J. & Tomasello, M. (2007). The gestural communication of apes and monkeys. Manhaw NJ: LEA.
- Jensen, K., Call, J. & Tomasello, M. (2007). Chimpanzees are rational maximizers in an ultimatum game. Science, 318, 107–109.
- Call, J. & Tomasello, M. (2008). Does the chimpanzee have a theory of mind? 30 years later. Trends in Cognitive Sciences, 12, 187–192.
- Cornelia Schrauf; Josep Call; Koki Fuwa; Satoshi Hirata (Jul 2012). "Do Chimpanzees Use Weight to Select Hammer Tools?". PLOS ONE. 7 (7) e41044. Bibcode:2012PLoSO...741044S. doi:10.1371/journal.pone.0041044. PMC 3399814. PMID 22815905.
- Call, J. (2017), "Bonobos, chimpanzees and tools: Integrating species-specific physiological biases and socio-ecology," in Hare, Brian & Yamamoto, Shinya (eds.), Bonobos: Unique in Mind, Brain, and Behavior, Oxford UP.
