= Louis F. Vetter =

American politician and businessman

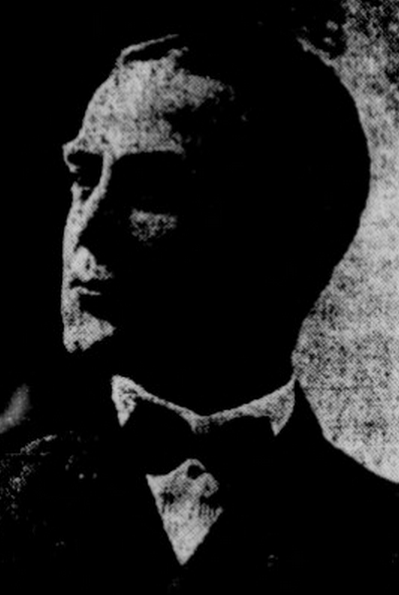
Vetter around 1905

Louis Fisher Vetter (March 22, 1857 – January 1, 1923) was an American businessman, writer and politician in Los Angeles, California, who was noted for the number of social clubs in which he was active. He was a member of the Los Angeles City Council from 1898 to 1900.

== Personal ==
Vetter was born in Washington, Illinois, in 1857, and he relocated from Salt Lake City to San Francisco in 1883. In 1886 he came to Los Angeles to help open the R.G. Dun & Co. mercantile firm. He returned two years later to manage it, and he remained until leaving the firm in 1890 to go into the insurance business. He was "prominently associated with the business and political development of the Southland" and was head of the Louis F. Vetter bonding company in the Bradbury Building. In 1910 he was one of the incorporators of the Los Angeles Milling Company, and he became its vice-president.

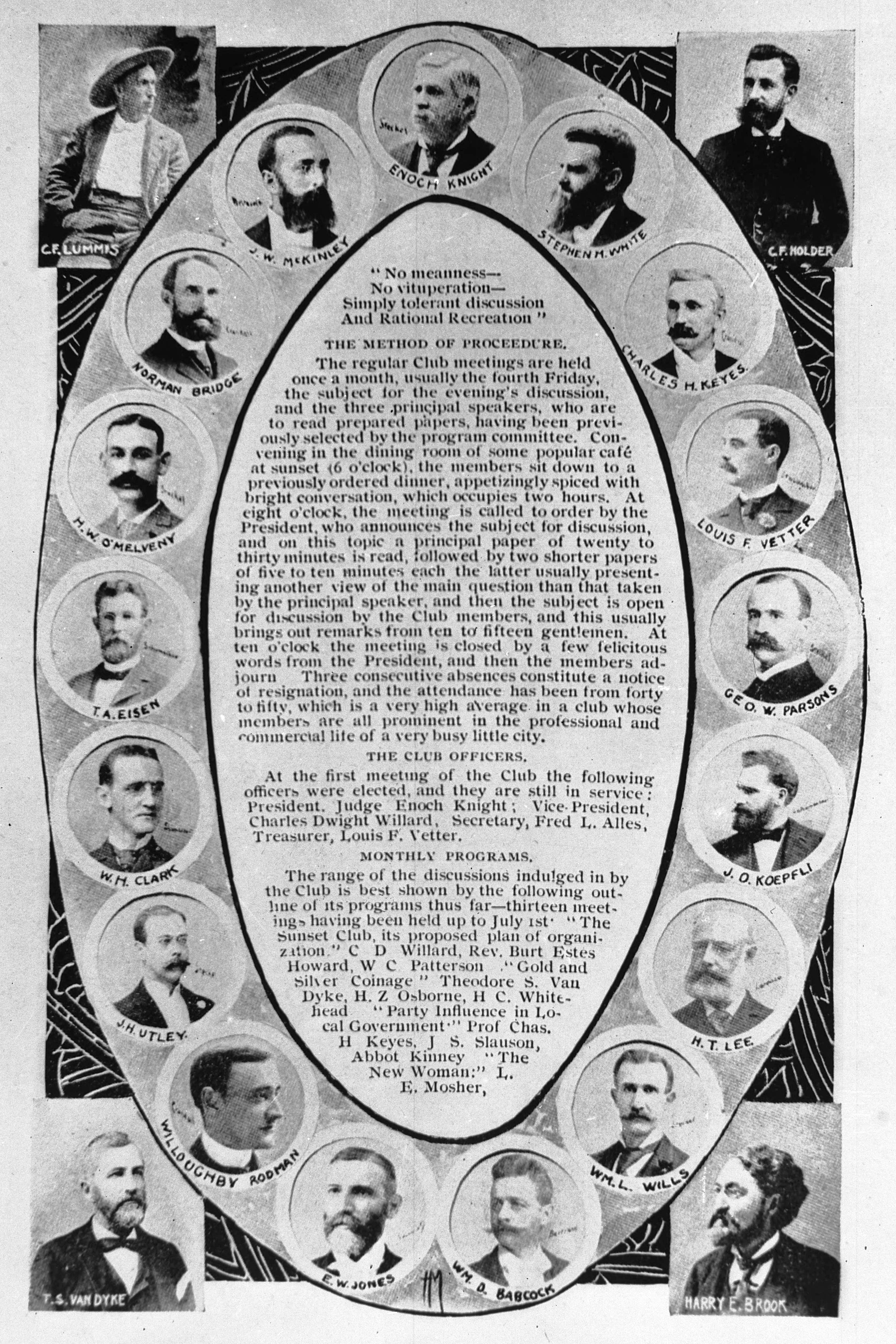
Pictured on the upper-right in the written procedures of the Sunset Club, 1895

A member of the Hollywood Blue Lodge and the Knights Templar of the Masonic brotherhood, Vetter was also in the Los Angeles Country Club and the Bohemian Club of San Francisco. He was active in the California Club, where he lived during the last ten years of his life. He was once referred to as "the club man of club men, . . . a composite of sagacity and good fellowship."

The Los Angeles Times said of him:

One of the exceptionally clever writers of the Scribes, Mr. Vetter was dramatic correspondent for the New York Clipper from 1891 to 1911[,] and his trenchant, though good-natured criticisms attracted attention throughout the country.

Vetter died January 1, 1923, in his residence at the California Club. The cause of death was given as acute indigestion. A funeral service was conducted at St. John's Episcopal Church by Bishop Joseph H. Johnson, and cremation followed at Hollywood Cemetery. Active pallbearers were R.W. Burnham and Joseph Scott from the Sunset Club, R.W. Pridham and A.B. Cass from the Los Angeles Chamber of Commerce, and J.E. Fishburn and Remson D. Bird, president of Occidental College, from the Bohemian Club.

== Politics ==
In October 1896 Vetter announced that he was a candidate for the office of mayor of Los Angeles in the December election, but instead the local Republican Party chose Julius H. Martin to run on its ticket, and Vetter was elected chairman of the Republican City and Central Committee, which had charge of the overall county campaign.

In February 1897 Vetter announced that he would leave his position on the Board of Fire Commissioners because he was taking part in the formation of a new corporation, the Home Telephone Company, and the city charter did not allow a city official to compete for "any sort of franchise."

He was elected to the City Council from the 3rd Ward on December 5, 1898, for a two-year term. On the council, one of the projects he spoke for was the installation of "a suitable lavatory in Sixth Street or Central Park," the present Pershing Square. He said it could be done by "raising the bandstand and placing the rooms underneath it." He also urged that the city electrician be requested "to see if some means cannot be devised" to dim the headlights of streetcars while they were "traveling the crowded streets of the city."

Vetter failed of renomination by the local Republican Party convention after he opposed opening up a district surrounding Westlake Park, the present McArthur Park, for oil drilling. It was said that Vetter had thus earned the enmity of an influential "oil speculator and money lender," W. E. De Groot, who was quoted as saying he would spend ten thousand dollars to defeat Vetter if he were renominated. This disagreement led to a short bout of fisticuffs when the two men met by happenstance one night in the Hotel Wellington, and Vetter knocked the "very abusive" De Groot to the floor with a blow to the side of the head.

== Legacy ==
His estate was estimated at a value of $300,000 at his death, of which the state of California was to receive about $43,000 in inheritance tax. He left most of his estate to Spencer Grant of San Francisco, "son of the late Mr. Grant's closest friend." He bequeathed more than $5,000 to Helen G. Currie, his secretary, and $1,000 to Mary E. MacGowan, another employee.
