= Washington Township, Tazewell County, Illinois =

Coordinates: 40°42′14″N 89°25′03″W

Washington Township
- Township
- Location in Tazewell County
- Country: United States
- State: Illinois
- County: Tazewell
- Established: November 6, 1849

Area
  - Total: 54.87 sq mi (142.1 km^{2})
  - Land: 54.86 sq mi (142.1 km^{2})
  - Water: 0.01 sq mi (0.026 km^{2}) 0.02%

Population (2020)
  - Estimate (2024): 24,276
  - Density: 430.3/sq mi (166.1/km^{2})
- Time zone: UTC-6 (CST)
  - Summer (DST): UTC-5 (CDT)
- FIPS code: 17-179-79046
- Website: washingtontwptazewell.org

Washington Township is located in Tazewell County, Illinois. As of the 2020 census, its population was 24,595 and it contained 10,233 housing units, of which 9,671 were occupied.

== Geography ==
According to the 2010 census, the township has a total area of 54.87 square miles (142.1 km^{2}), of which 54.86 square miles (142.1 km^{2}) (or 99.98%) is land and 0.01 square miles (0.026 km^{2}) (or 0.02%) is water. It contains the city of Washington, the unincorporated community of Sunnyland, and parts of East Peoria.

== Demographics ==
Historical population
Census	Pop.	Note	%±
1890	2,958		—
1900	2,928		−1.0%
2010	25,097		—
2020	24,565		−2.1%
2024 (est.)	24,276		−1.2%
U.S. Decennial Census
