= Jerry Hirsch =

American psychologist and behavior geneticist

- Born: September 20, 1922; Manhattan, New York City, New York
- Died: May 3, 2008 (aged 85); Urbana, Illinois
- Education: University of California, Berkeley
- Awards: 2006 Dobzhansky Award from the Behavior Genetics Association
- Scientific career
- Fields: Behavior genetics
- Workplaces: Columbia University; University of Illinois at Urbana-Champaign
- Thesis: The determinants of learning without awareness (1955)
- Notable students: Tim Tully

Jerome Edwin Hirsch (September 20, 1922 – May 3, 2008) was an American psychologist known for his pioneering work in behavior genetics, and for his advocacy for social justice. He has been described as "the pioneer who brought quantitative genetic analysis to the study of behavior."

== Biography ==
He was born on September 20, 1922, in Manhattan, New York City.

Hirsch began his interest in behavior genetics in the 1950s, as a student at the University of California, Berkeley, where he studied under Edward C. Tolman and Robert Tryon. From 1956 to 1960, he was an assistant professor at Columbia University, where he worked alongside Theodosius Dobzhansky. He later conducted multiple influential studies on the genetic origins of behaviors in Drosophila melanogaster, Dobzhansky's favorite species. He subsequently continued this research at the University of Illinois at Urbana-Champaign, where he became an associate professor of psychology and zoology in 1960. He became a full professor of psychology there in 1963, of zoology in 1966, and of ecology, ethology, and evolution in 1976. On March 30, 1970, he hosted the founding meeting of the Behavior Genetics Association at the University of Illinois at Urbana-Champaign. He was the editor-in-chief of Animal Behaviour from 1968 to 1972 and of the Journal of Comparative Psychology from 1983 to 1988. He retired from the University of Illinois in 1993, and remained an active emeritus professor there until 2004.

He died on May 3, 2008, at his home in Urbana, Illinois.

=== Criticism of hereditarians ===
Hirsch was an early and vocal critic of the work of Arthur Jensen, who argued that group differences in educational ability were heritable. Hirsch argued that Jensen's work was a misuse and misrepresentation of behavior genetics and that Jensen's "avowed goals" were "as heinously barbaric as were Hitler's and the anti-abolitionists". In the mid-1960s, William Shockley tried to convince Hirsch to support his views on the heritability of racial differences in IQ. This attempt was unsuccessful, and Hirsch subsequently called the nature-nurture debate a "pseudo-question".
