= Washington, Illinois =

Washington
- City
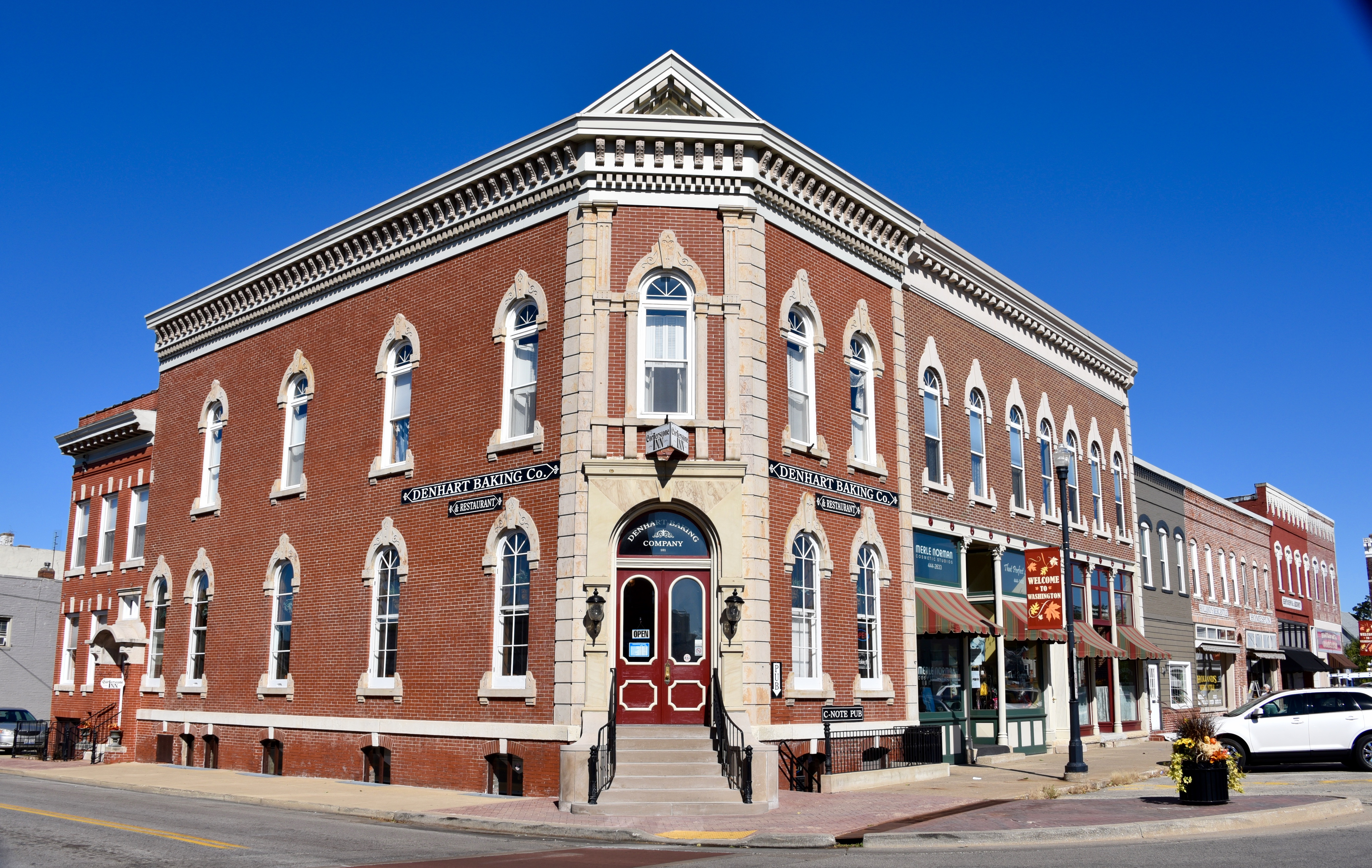
- Denhart Bank Building at 101 Washington Sq.
- Motto: "Your Pathway To Discovery; Enjoyment And Knowledge"
- Location of Washington in Tazewell County, Illinois.
- Coordinates: 40°42′36″N 89°24′15″W
- Country: United States
- State: Illinois
- County: Tazewell
- Township: Washington
- First settled: 1825
- Founded: 1833 as Holland's Grove
- Renamed: 1837 as Washington
- Founder: William Holland Sr.
- Named for: George Washington

Government
  - Type: Council–manager
  - Mayor: Lilija Stevens

Area
  - Total: 8.56 sq mi (22.17 km^{2})
  - Land: 8.54 sq mi (22.13 km^{2})
  - Water: 0.012 sq mi (0.03 km^{2})
- Elevation: 758 ft (231 m)

Population (2020)
  - Total: 16,071
  - Estimate (2024): 15,857 ▼
  - Density: 1,880.8/sq mi (726.17/km^{2})
- Time zone: UTC−6 (CST)
  - Summer (DST): UTC−5 (CDT)
- ZIP code: 61571
- Area code: 309
- FIPS code: 17-79033
- GNIS feature ID: 2397206
- Website: ci.washington.il.us

Washington is a city in Tazewell County, Illinois, United States. Washington is on U.S. Route 24 and Illinois Route 8, northeast of East Peoria. The population was 16,071 at the 2020 census, a 48.2% percent increase over 2000. It is a suburb of Peoria and is part of the Peoria Metropolitan Statistical Area.

== History ==
Washington was settled in 1825 by William Holland Sr., who came from North Carolina and was hired by the U.S. government to provide blacksmith services to the local Native Americans. During his long and eventful life, he was married three times, and was the father of twenty-one children: fourteen by his first wife and seven by his second wife. He had eighty-two grandchildren and fifty great-grandchildren. He died in Washington on November 27, 1871, at the age of ninety-one. The post office (and later the city) was originally named Holland's Grove on February 12, 1833 before being renamed in honor of the first U.S. president, George Washington, on September 13, 1837.

In the 1920s, a man named George Heyl put Washington on the map as the home of the famous Heyl Pony Farm. Some of the original barns still exist on North Main Street. The Heyl Pony Farm supplied Shetland ponies to buyers around the world; George Heyl also raised purebred poultry. When Heyl died suddenly in 1932, it was recorded as one of the largest funerals ever held in Washington.

Another local site of interest is the "old canning factory", which is now occupied by American Allied Railway Equipment Company, Inc. In 1943, the canning factory (which after the war was run by the Libby's company) had a shortage of workers, and the government needed K rations and canned goods to feed the troops. To meet the demand, fifty captured German soldiers from the prisoner of war camp known as Camp Ellis in Fulton County were brought in. The Washington sub-camp was first commanded by Colonel John S. Sullivan, and later by Captain T. A. Cox. The POWs were brought in on the old rail line that ran down Wood Street (the foundation of a sentry tower can be seen just northeast of the intersection of Wood and Jefferson near the entrance to the bike trail). They were trucked from the camp to various local farms to help with the pumpkin harvest. The prisoners were allowed no visitors, nor could residents speak to the prisoners. An exception was made for local ministers, such as Pastor Kammeyer from St. Mark's Lutheran Church, who spoke fluent German and ministered to the POWs' spiritual needs.

A new community center, named Five Points Washington, opened in October 2007. The facility houses the Washington District Library, a performing arts center, swimming pools, fitness center, and banquet center.

=== 2013 tornado ===
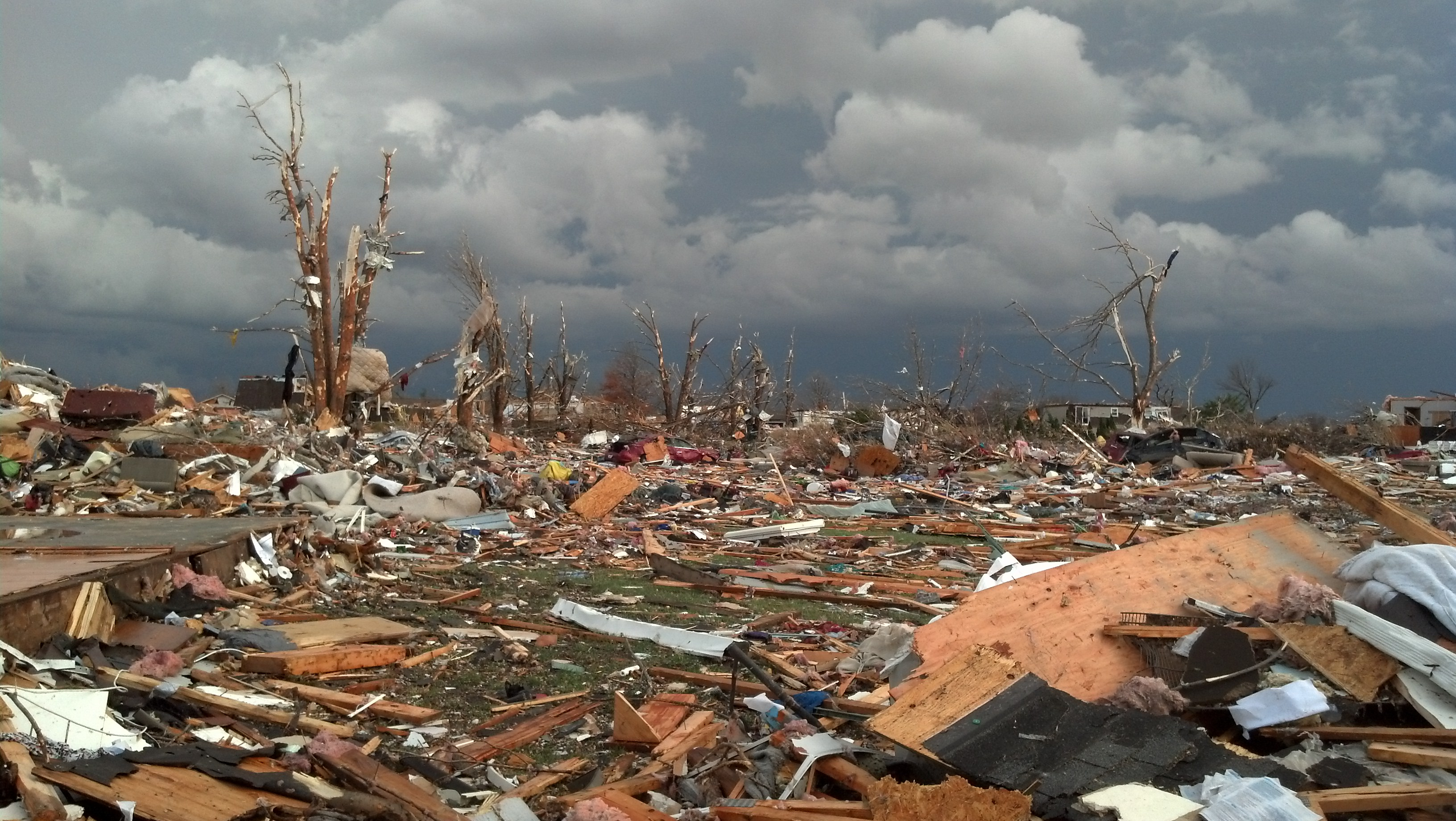
Damage to houses and trees shortly after the November 17, 2013 tornado.

An EF4 tornado, part of the tornado outbreak of November 17, 2013, entered Washington from the southwest in East Peoria. Three people were killed, one during the storm and two others later from injuries, including a United States Army veteran. The tornado then destroyed the Georgetown Commons apartment complex, including ripping second floors off of most of the seventeen apartment buildings. Hundreds of homes were destroyed as the tornado moved through town before finally exiting on the north side.

== Geography ==
According to the 2010 census, Washington has a total area of 8.182 sq mi (21.19 km^{2}), of which 8.17 sq mi (21.16 km^{2}) (or 99.85%) is land and 0.012 sq mi (0.03 km^{2}) (or 0.15%) is water.

=== Climate ===
Washington has a humid continental climate (Köppen Dfa), with cold, snowy winters, and hot, humid summers. Monthly daily mean temperatures range from 22.5 °F (−5.3 °C) to 75.2 °F (24.0 °C). Snowfall is common in the winter, averaging 26.3 inches (67 cm), but this figure varies considerably for different years. Precipitation, averaging at 36 inches (914 mm), peaks in the spring and summer, and is the least in winter. Extremes have ranged from −27 °F (−33 °C) in January 1884 to 113 °F (45 °C) in July 1936.

== Demographics ==
Historical population
Census	Pop.	Note	%±
1850	712		—
1860	1,578		121.6%
1870	1,607		1.8%
1880	1,397		−13.1%
1890	1,301		−6.9%
1900	1,459		12.1%
1910	1,530		4.9%
1920	1,643		7.4%
1930	1,741		6.0%
1940	2,456		41.1%
1950	4,285		74.5%
1960	5,919		38.1%
1970	6,790		14.7%
1980	10,364		52.6%
1990	10,099		−2.6%
2000	10,841		7.3%
2010	15,134		39.6%
2020	16,071		6.2%
U.S. Decennial Census

=== 2020 census ===
As of the 2020 census, Washington had a population of 16,071. The median age was 38.7 years. 27.2% of residents were under the age of 18 and 17.3% of residents were 65 years of age or older. For every 100 females there were 94.2 males, and for every 100 females age 18 and over there were 90.8 males age 18 and over.

98.9% of residents lived in urban areas, while 1.1% lived in rural areas.

There were 6,216 households in Washington, of which 36.2% had children under the age of 18 living in them. Of all households, 56.8% were married-couple households, 13.6% were households with a male householder and no spouse or partner present, and 24.3% were households with a female householder and no spouse or partner present. About 25.8% of all households were made up of individuals and 13.3% had someone living alone who was 65 years of age or older.

There were 6,551 housing units, of which 5.1% were vacant. The homeowner vacancy rate was 2.4% and the rental vacancy rate was 5.5%.

Racial composition as of the 2020 census
Race	Number	Percent
White	14,917	92.8%
Black or African American	134	0.8%
American Indian and Alaska Native	25	0.2%
Asian	174	1.1%
Native Hawaiian and Other Pacific Islander	3	0.0%
Some other race	121	0.8%
Two or more races	697	4.3%
Hispanic or Latino (of any race)	377	2.3%

=== 2000 census ===
As of the census of 2000, there were 10,841 people, 4,189 households, and 3,091 families residing in the city. The population density was 1,450.0/sq mi (559.8/km^{2}). There were 4,403 housing units at an average density of 588.9/sq mi (227.4/km^{2}). The racial makeup of the city was 98.36% White, 0.26% African American, 0.08% Native American, 0.42% Asian, 0.26% from other races, and 0.62% from two or more races. Hispanic or Latino of any race were 0.67% of the population.

There were 4,189 households, out of which 35.3% had children under the age of 18 living with them, 63.8% were married couples living together, 7.7% had a female householder with no husband present, and 26.2% were non-families. 22.5% of all households were made up of individuals, and 8.5% had someone living alone who was 65 years of age or older. The average household size was 2.56 and the average family size was 3.02.

In the city, the population was spread out, with 26.0% under the age of 18, 7.9% from 18 to 24, 29.7% from 25 to 44, 23.3% from 45 to 64, and 13.0% who were 65 years of age or older. The median age was 37 years. For every 100 females, there were 95.3 males. For every 100 females age 18 and over, there were 90.5 males.

=== Income and poverty ===
The median income for a household in the city was $71,702, and the median income for a family was $61,184. Males had a median income of $64,388 versus $43,460 for females. The per capita income for the city was $24,231. About 2.8% of families and 4.1% of the population were below the poverty line, including 4.5% of those under age 18 and 3.5% of those age 65 or over.

== Employment ==
As of 2000, 66.8% of people aged 16 and over were employed in the civilian labor force, 2.8% were "unemployed" in the civilian work force, 0.1% were in the armed forces, and 30.3% were not in the labor force. Average travel time to work for Washington residents was 21.5 min.

The Washington Chamber of Commerce lists the following information about employers:

Employment by occupation category

Category	percentage
Management and professional	38.3%
Service	13.3%
Sales and office	27.5%
Farming, fishing, and forestry	0.1%
Construction, extraction, and maintenance	8.1%
Production, transportation, and material moving	12.8%

Employers - Manufacturers and distributor

Company name	Business type	Approx. employees
Illinois Valley Plastics	molded components	100
BTD Manufacturing	metal fabrication	70
American Allied Railway Equipment	rail wheels and brakes	66
WICC, Ltd.	electrical components	41
RP Short Run	printing and graphics	36
Global Fire Equipment/MES	fire trucks, apparatus	36
Akron Brass	fire fighting equipment	26

Employers - Retailers

Company name	Business type	Approx. employees
Wal-Mart Supercenter	general merchandise	340
Uftring Chevrolet	automobile sales and service	105
Kroger	grocer	90
Lindy's Downtown Market	grocer	54

Employers - Services and institutions

Organization	Business type	Approx. employees
Washington school districts (combined)	education	425
Washington Christian Village	elderly care	125
City of Washington	local government	80
Washington Park District	parks and recreation entity	76

== Government ==
Washington uses a council–manager form of government with an appointed city administrator, acting as the chief administrative officer and managing day-to-day operations, and an elected mayor. As of May 2025, the current city administrator is Dennis Carr and the current mayor is Lilija V. Stevens.

In January 2025, Washington Police Chief Mike McCoy announced a full staff of 25 sworn officers and a waiting list.

== Education ==
District 308 is Washington Community High School and has 1359 students in attendance as of August 2017. District 308 contains three elementary public school districts: District 50 (John L. Hensey and Beverly Manor), 51 (Central), and 52 (which consists of Lincoln Grade and Washington Middle school), as well as St. Patrick's School, which is private and Catholic.

- Beverly Manor Middle School (District 50)
- Central Primary School (District 51)
- Central Intermediate School (District 51)
- John L. Hensey Elementary School (District 50)
- Lincoln Grade School (District 52)
- Washington Middle School (District 52)
- Washington Community High School District 308
- St. Patrick School (Roman Catholic Diocese of Peoria)

Tazewell County has a joint special education service, the Tazewell-Mason Counties Special Education Association (TMCSEA).

== Transportation ==
CityLink provides bus service on Route 8 connecting Washington to downtown Peoria, East Peoria and other destinations.

U.S. Route 24 runs east–west outside of Washington. Business U.S. 24 runs through the downtown square of Washington.

== Annual events ==
- 9-11 Memorial Walk
- Good Neighbor Days, previously called the Cherry Festival
- Memorial Day Parade
- Take Pride in Washington Day
- Veterans Day Parade
- Washington Fine Arts Festival

== Notable people ==
- Earle C. Anthony (1880—1961), businessman and philanthropist, spent early years in Washington
- Brad Avery (born 1971), guitarist of the band Third Day
- Dan Butterly (born 1970), commissioner of the Big West Conference
- Shelby M. Cullom (1829–1914), governor of Illinois
- Mark Dennis (born 1965), offensive tackle for various teams; member of the Greater Peoria Sports Hall of Fame
- Theodore Christian Frye (1869–1962), botanist, spent early years in Washington
- Clyde Garrison (1888–1959), kingpin of Peoria gambling scene
- Joseph V. Graff (1854–1921), politician, buried in Washington
- Diana (Tarvin) Hacker (1942–2004), American writer and educator
- Doug Lee (born 1964), basketball guard and small forward with three teams
- David H. McClugage (1880–1944), mayor of Peoria, namesake of Peoria bridge
- Mason McCoy (born 1995), major league baseball player
- Matthew McDonough (born 1969), drummer of heavy metal band Mudvayne
- Bobby McGrath, professional pool player
- Robert Megginson (born 1948), mathematician, born in Washington
- Alec Peters (born 1995), basketball player, second-round selection in 2017 NBA draft
- Fred Taral (1867–1925), Hall of Fame jockey and trainer, raised in Washington
- Tim Tully (born 1954), neurobiologist
- Christian Uphoff (born 1998), football player
- Colton Underwood (born 1992), NFL player and star of ABC's The Bachelor
- Louis F. Vetter (1857–1923), businessman, writer, and politician, spent early years in Washington
- Andrew Werner (born 1987), major league baseball player

== See also ==
- Ronald Reagan Trail
