= Journal of Comparative Psychology =

- Discipline: Comparative psychology
- Language: English
- Edited by: Michael J. Beran

Publication details
- History: 1921-present
- Publisher: American Psychological Association (United States)
- Frequency: Quarterly
- Impact factor: 0.9 (2024)

Standard abbreviations
- ISO 4: J. Comp. Psychol.

Indexing
- CODEN: JCOPDT
- ISSN: 0735-7036 (print); 1939-2087 (web)
- LCCN: 83648068
- OCLC no.: 08997203

Links
- Journal homepage; Online access

The Journal of Comparative Psychology is a quarterly peer-reviewed academic journal published by the American Psychological Association. It covers research from a comparative perspective on the behavior, cognition, perception, and social relationships of diverse species.

The journal has implemented the Transparency and Openness Promotion (TOP) Guidelines. The TOP Guidelines provide structure to research planning and reporting and aim to make research more transparent, accessible, and reproducible.

== History ==
The journal was established in 1921 through the merger of Psychobiology and the Journal of Animal Behavior. It was renamed Journal of Comparative and Physiological Psychology in 1947, and reestablished in 1983 when the journal was split into Behavioral Neuroscience and the Journal of Comparative Psychology. Past editors-in-chief include Jerry Hirsch (1983), Gordon Gallup (1989), Charles Snowdon (1994), Meredith West (2001), Gordon Burghardt (2005), Josep Call (2017), and Dorothy M. Fragaszy. The current editor is Michael J. Beran.

== Abstracting and indexing ==
The journal is abstracted and indexed by MEDLINE/PubMed and the Social Sciences Citation Index. According to the Journal Citation Reports, the journal has a 2024 impact factor of 0.9.
