= Journal of Comparative and Physiological Psychology =

- Discipline: Comparative psychology
- Language: English

Publication details
- History: 1921-1982
- Publisher: American Psychological Association
- Frequency: Bimonthly

Standard abbreviations
- ISO 4: J. Comp. Physiol. Psychol.

Indexing
- CODEN: JCPPAV
- ISSN: 0021-9940
- LCCN: 22021128
- OCLC no.: 1714812

The Journal of Comparative and Physiological Psychology was a peer-reviewed academic journal published by the American Psychological Association. It was established in 1921 as the result of a merger between two journals, Psychobiology (1918–1920) and the Journal of Animal Behavior (1911–1916), under the title Journal of Comparative Psychology. It was renamed Journal of Comparative and Physiological Psychology in 1947. Publication ceased in 1982 when the journal was split into Behavioral Neuroscience and the re-instated Journal of Comparative Psychology.

From 1965 till 1982, the journal was abstracted and indexed in Index Medicus/MEDLINE/PubMed.
