= 2004 Roanoke tornado =

2004 F4 tornado

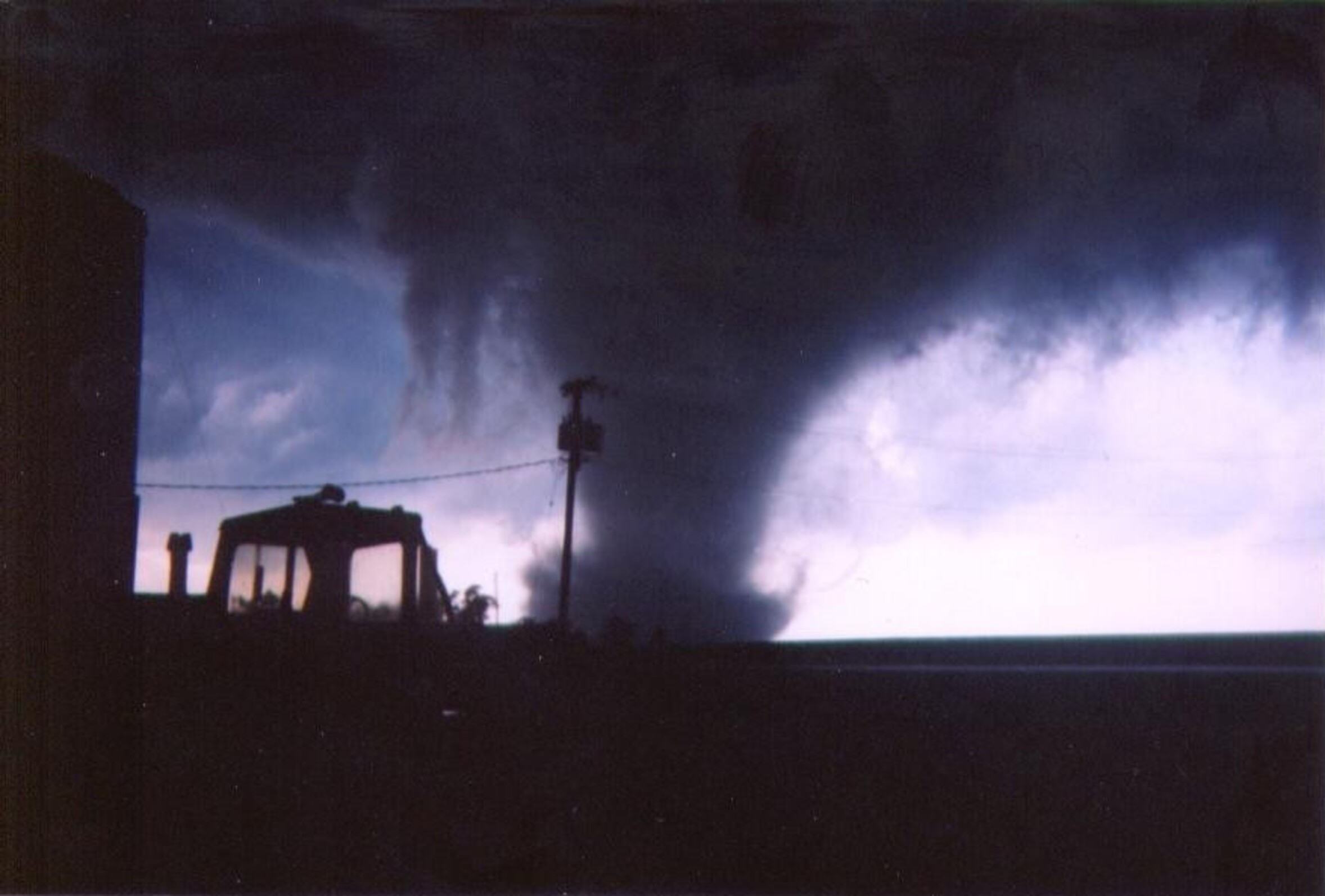
- The tornado as seen west of Roanoke

Meteorological history
- Formed: July 13, 2004 , 2:30 p.m. CST (UTC–06:00)
- Dissipated: July 13, 2004 , 2:55 p.m. CST (UTC–06:00)
- Duration: 25 minutes

F4 tornado
- on the Fujita scale
- Highest winds: 240 mph (390 km/h)

Overall effects
- Injuries: 3
- Areas affected: Roanoke, Illinois
- Part of the tornado outbreaks of 2004

During the afternoon hours of July 13, 2004, a powerful F4 tornado formed outside of Roanoke, a small town in central Illinois. It is best known for the numerous videos and pictures taken of it as well as the complete destruction of the Parsons Manufacturing plant. Despite the damage, there were only three minor injuries and no fatalities. It was one of six tornadoes to touch down that day.

== Tornado summary ==
At about 2:30 p.m., the tornado, with a maximum reported width of a one-quarter mile (0.40 km), struck west of the village of Roanoke, damaging much of the area and cutting power to the main town of Roanoke for three days. Based on the extreme damage, the tornado was classified as a violent F4 on the Fujita scale by the National Weather Service. The tornado started approximately 1.8 miles (2.9 km) north of Metamora, located eight miles (13 km) west of Roanoke, and lifted approximately 2.5 miles (4.0 km) southeast of Roanoke. The tornado moved roughly southeasterly for a distance of 9.6 miles (15.4 kilometers) over about 25 minutes.

== Aftermath & impact ==
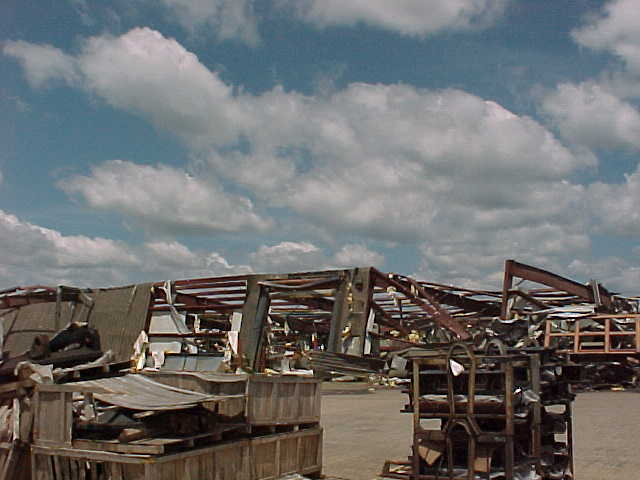
The Parsons Company manufacturing plant after the tornado

=== Aftermath ===
The worst damage occurred at the Parsons Company manufacturing plant, a parts' supplier for Caterpillar Inc., which was leveled, losing its roof and outer walls. Although about 140 people were inside the building when the tornado struck, there were no fatalities and only a few minor injuries. This was attributed to preparations made during the construction of the plant and spotter training given to some of the workers. Although no tornado sirens were heard at the plant before the tornado struck, an alarm sounded by one of the spotters allowed all the workers to move to storm shelters and ride out the storm.

Large steel beams from the Parsons plant were blown approximately 3/4-mile (1.2 km) away, and many of the employees' cars tossed into nearby cornfields. Three neighboring farmsteads were completely swept away, with only debris remaining in the basements. Trees were debarked, and farm machinery was thrown and mangled.

=== Impact ===
The storm was an example of how structural planning, storm spotting, and awareness techniques can be used by companies. The plant owner's decision to include storm shelters in the building's design likely saved the lives of many employees. Just as important, the early notice provided by the company storm-spotters allowed employees to reach the shelters before the storm struck. The Parsons plant reopened in April 2005 with seven tornado shelters, five more than the original plant.

Two local residents chased the tornado for much of its 23-minute duration. They produced a half-hour-long video that was sold in the Peoria area to help raise funds for employees of the Parsons plant, most of whom had lost their cars and were either underinsured or not insured.

The Roanoke tornado was the most significant tornado of a small tornado outbreak which transitioned into a destructive derecho over an extensive area of the Ohio and Tennessee Valleys extending to the Gulf of Mexico. The outbreak produced three other tornadoes, all rated F0. The Roanoke 2004 Tornado was featured on The Weather Channel's Storm Stories and Full Force Nature.

The Parsons plant would come very close to being destroyed again during the Washington, IL tornado on November 17, 2013, however, that tornado passed just northwest of the plant.

== See also ==
- Weather of 2004
- List of North American tornadoes and tornado outbreaks
- List of F4 and EF4 tornadoes
  - List of F4 and EF4 tornadoes (2000–2009)
- List of derecho events
