= Dana, Illinois =

Dana
- Village
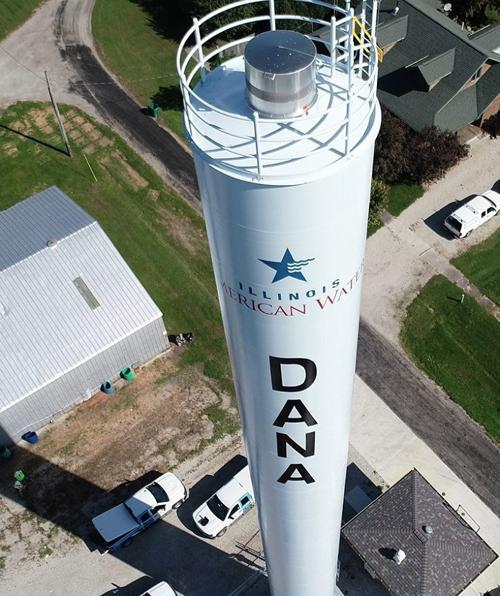
- Water Tower in Dana

- Location of Dana in LaSalle County, Illinois.
- Coordinates: 40°57′23″N 88°57′00″W
- Country: United States
- State: Illinois
- County: LaSalle
- Township: Groveland

Area
  - Total: 0.22 sq mi (0.57 km^{2})
  - Land: 0.22 sq mi (0.57 km^{2})
  - Water: 0 sq mi (0.00 km^{2})
- Elevation: 669 ft (204 m)

Population (2020)
  - Total: 162
  - Density: 735.0/sq mi (283.77/km^{2})
- Time zone: UTC-6 (CST)
  - Summer (DST): UTC-5 (CDT)
- ZIP code: 61321
- Area code: 815
- FIPS code: 17-18485
- GNIS feature ID: 2398676

Dana is a village in LaSalle County, Illinois, United States. As of the 2020 census, Dana had a population of 162. It is part of the Ottawa Micropolitan Statistical Area, as well as a part of the geographic region known as Streatorland.

== History ==
Dana was originally called Martin. The present name is for Thomas Dana, a railroad official. A post office has been in operation at Dana since 1873.

== Geography ==
According to the 2021 census gazetteer files, Dana has a total area of 0.22 square miles (0.57 km^{2}), all land.

== Demographics ==
Historical population
Census	Pop.	Note	%±
1880	156		—
1890	221		41.7%
1900	310		40.3%
1910	254		−18.1%
1920	251		−1.2%
1930	253		0.8%
1940	253		0.0%
1950	246		−2.8%
1960	240		−2.4%
1970	173		−27.9%
1980	243		40.5%
1990	165		−32.1%
2000	171		3.6%
2010	159		−7.0%
2020	162		1.9%
U.S. Decennial Census

As of the 2020 census there were 162 people, 40 households, and 25 families residing in the village. The population density was 736.36 inhabitants per square mile (284.31/km^{2}). There were 64 housing units at an average density of 290.91 per square mile (112.32/km^{2}). The racial makeup of the village was 91.98% White, 1.23% from other races, and 6.79% from two or more races. Hispanic or Latino of any race were 1.23% of the population.

There were 40 households, out of which 40.0% had children under the age of 18 living with them, 45.00% were married couples living together, 12.50% had a female householder with no husband present, and 37.50% were non-families. 30.00% of all households were made up of individuals, and 12.50% had someone living alone who was 65 years of age or older. The average household size was 3.16 and the average family size was 2.48.

The village's age distribution consisted of 26.3% under the age of 18, 5.1% from 18 to 24, 27.2% from 25 to 44, 31.3% from 45 to 64, and 10.1% who were 65 years of age or older. The median age was 36.2 years. For every 100 females, there were 83.3 males. For every 100 females age 18 and over, there were 78.0 males.

The median income for a household in the village was $47,500, and the median income for a family was $56,250. Males had a median income of $46,250 versus $14,286 for females. The per capita income for the village was $20,816. About 8.0% of families and 7.2% of the population were below the poverty line, including 8.3% of those under age 18 and none of those age 65 or over.
