= HT-0712 =

Chemical compound

Clinical data
- Other names: HT-0712, IPL 455,903
- ATC code: None

Identifiers
- IUPAC name: (3S,5S)-5-(3-(Cyclopentyloxy)-4-methoxyphenyl)-3-(3-methylbenzyl)piperidin-2-one
- CAS Number: 617720-02-2
- PubChem CID: 9865375
- ChemSpider: 8041067
- UNII: 2O43FXG9IG
- CompTox Dashboard (EPA): DTXSID70893926

Chemical and physical data
- Formula: C_{25}H_{31}NO_{3}
- Molar mass: 393.527 g·mol^{−1}
- 3D model (JSmol): Interactive image
- SMILES: O=C3NC[C@H](c2cc(OC1CCCC1)c(OC)cc2)C[C@H]3Cc4cccc(c4)C
- InChI: InChI=1S/C25H31NO3/c1-17-6-5-7-18(12-17)13-20-14-21(16-26-25(20)27)19-10-11-23(28-2)24(15-19)29-22-8-3-4-9-22/h5-7,10-12,15,20-22H,3-4,8-9,13-14,16H2,1-2H3,(H,26,27)/t20-,21-/m1/s1; Key:ABEJDMOBAFLQNJ-NHCUHLMSSA-N

HT-0712, also known as IPL-455903, is an experimental cognitive enhancing drug (nootropic) which is currently undergoing clinical trials. It is currently being licensed by Helicon Therapeutics in San Diego, California. It was originally discovered and tested as part of a preclinical anti-inflammatory program by Inflazyme Pharmaceuticals.

== Mechanism of action ==
HT-0712 appears to act as a PDE4 inhibitor, thereby increasing cAMP levels. When cAMP levels are increased in neurons, this may trigger the activation of cAMP response element-binding proteins (CREB). CREBs are transcription factors involved in the formation of long-term memory.

The side effects of the drug are not yet fully known.

== Research ==
A 2014 study found that HT-0712 significantly boosted memory formation in mice. Data also indicated that HT-0712 may be effective to treat age-associated memory impairment in humans.
