= Behavioral Neuroscience (journal) =

- Discipline: Behavioral neuroscience
- Language: English
- Edited by: Geoffrey Schoenbaum

Publication details
- History: 1983–present
- Publisher: American Psychological Association (United States)
- Frequency: Bimonthly
- Impact factor: 1.5 (2024)

Standard abbreviations
- ISO 4: Behav. Neurosci.

Indexing
- CODEN: BENEDJ
- ISSN: 0735-7044 (print); 1939-0084 (web)
- LCCN: 83644089
- OCLC no.: 8998034

Links
- Journal homepage; Online access

Behavioral Neuroscience is a bimonthly peer-reviewed scientific journal published by the American Psychological Association. It was established in 1983 and covers research in behavioral neuroscience.

The journal has implemented the Transparency and Openness Promotion (TOP) Guidelines. The TOP Guidelines provide structure to research planning and reporting and aim to make research more transparent, accessible, and reproducible.

== Abstracting and indexing ==
The journal is abstracted and indexed by MEDLINE/PubMed and the Social Sciences Citation Index. According to the Journal Citation Reports, the journal has a 2024 impact factor of 1.5.
