= Krys Barnes =

American football player (born 1998)

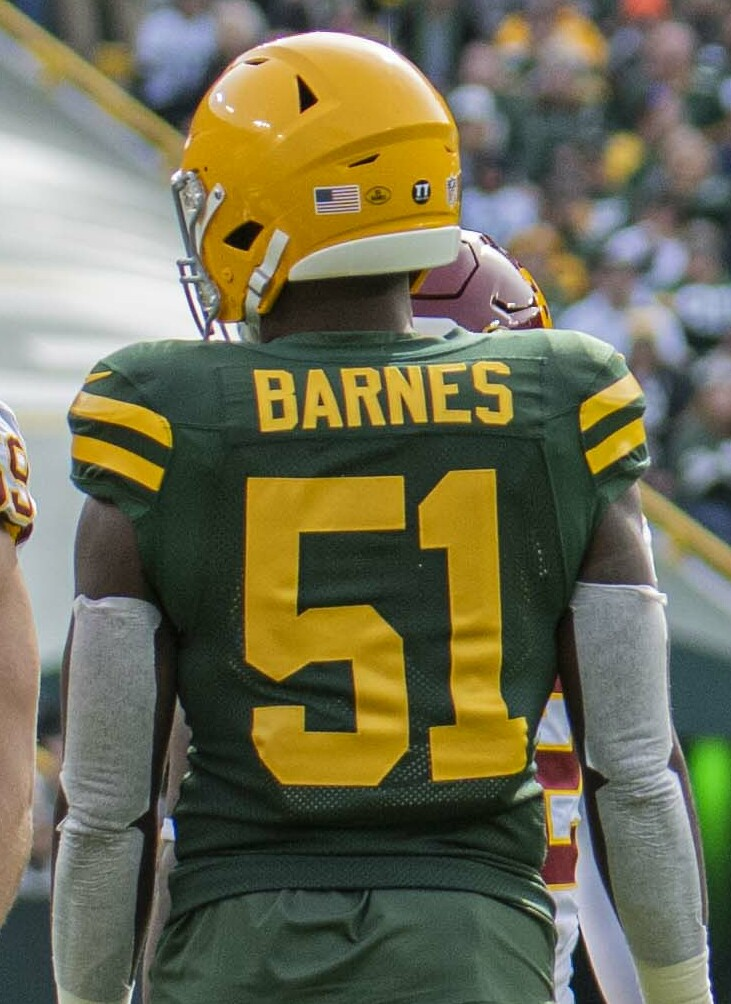
- Barnes with the Green Bay Packers in 2021

No. 43 – Cleveland Browns
- Position: Linebacker
- Roster status: Practice squad

Personal information
- Born: April 2, 1998 (age 28); Bakersfield, California, U.S.
- Listed height: 6 ft 2 in (1.88 m)
- Listed weight: 229 lb (104 kg)

Career information
- High school: Liberty (Bakersfield)
- College: UCLA (2016–2019)
- NFL draft: 2020: undrafted

Career history
- Green Bay Packers (2020–2022); Arizona Cardinals (2023–2024); Carolina Panthers (2025); Washington Commanders (2026)*; Cleveland Browns (2026–present)*
- * Offseason or practice squad member only

Career NFL statistics as of 2025
- Total tackles: 303
- Sacks: 5.5
- Forced fumbles: 1
- Fumble recoveries: 2
- Pass deflections: 10
- Interceptions: 1
- Stats at Pro Football Reference

Krystopher Nathaniel Barnes (born April 2, 1998) is an American professional football linebacker for the Cleveland Browns of the National Football League (NFL). Barnes played college football for the UCLA Bruins and signed with the Green Bay Packers as an undrafted free agent in 2020. He has also played for the Arizona Cardinals, Carolina Panthers, and Washington Commanders.

== Early life ==
Barnes was born and grew up in Bakersfield, California. He attended and played football at Liberty High School, along with childhood friend and future Green Bay Packers teammate Jordan Love. Together, Barnes and Love helped lead Liberty to the first Division I Central Section championship in school history.

== College career ==
In four seasons at UCLA, Barnes played in 43 games with 31 starts, recording 212 tackles (139 solo, 21 for loss), five sacks, and two interceptions. Barnes was All-Pac 12 Conference honorable mention his senior season.

== Professional career ==
Pre-draft measurables
Height	Weight	Arm length	Hand span	Wingspan
6 ft 1 3/4 in (1.87 m)	229 lb (104 kg)	31 5/8 in (0.80 m)	9 3/4 in (0.25 m)	6 ft 5 1/2 in (1.97 m)
All values from Pro Day

=== Green Bay Packers ===
On April 29, 2020, the Green Bay Packers signed Barnes to a three-year, $2.29 million contract as an undrafted free agent that includes a signing bonus of $7,000.

Throughout training camp, Barnes competed to be a starting inside linebacker against Oren Burks, Ty Summers, and fellow rookie Kamal Martin. On September 5, 2020, the Packers waived Barnes as part of their final roster cuts, but signed him to the practice squad the next day after clearing waivers. On September 12, 2020, the Green Bay Packers promoted Barnes to their active roster. Head coach Matt LaFleur elected to start Barnes at inside linebacker, alongside Christian Kirksey, to start the regular season.

He made his first career start and his professional debut in the Green Bay Packers’ season-opener at the Minnesota Vikings and recorded seven combined tackles (five solo) during their 43–34 victory. On October 18, 2020, Barnes recorded ten combined tackles (seven solo) during a 38–10 loss at the Tampa Bay Buccaneers in Week 6. In Week 7 against the Houston Texans, Barnes recorded his first career sack on Deshaun Watson during the 35–20 win. He was placed on the reserve/COVID-19 list by the team on November 6, 2020, and activated on December 2. In Week 15 against the Carolina Panthers, Barnes forced a fumble on quarterback Teddy Bridgewater at the one yard line that was recovered by the Packers during the 24–16 win.

During the team's matchup against the Kansas City Chiefs in Week 9, Barnes made a season-high 9 tackles, including one that prevented a touchdown by running back Darrel Williams. He signed his tender offer from the Packers on April 18, 2022, to keep him with the team.

In the 2022 season-opener at the Vikings, he sustained ankle injury, which put him on injured reserve. On November 5, 2022, he was activated off of injured reserve.

=== Arizona Cardinals ===
On March 25, 2023, Barnes signed with the Arizona Cardinals. He played in 16 games with six starts, recording 55 tackles, six passes defensed, and an interception.

Barnes appeared in all 17 games for Arizona during the 2024 season, accumulating two sacks and 35 combined tackles.

=== Carolina Panthers ===
On August 3, 2025, Barnes signed with the Carolina Panthers. He was released on August 26, and re-signed to the practice squad. On November 26, the Panthers signed Barnes to their active roster.

=== Washington Commanders ===
On August 18, 2026, Barnes signed with the Washington Commanders. On August 30, he was waived by the Commanders as a part of final roster cuts before the start of the regular season.

=== Cleveland Browns ===
On September 22, 2026, Barnes signed with the Cleveland Browns' practice squad.

== NFL career statistics ==
=== Regular season ===
Year	Team	GP	GS	Tackles				Interceptions						Fumbles	
Year	Team	GP	GS	Total	Solo	Ast	Sck	PDef	Int	Yds	Avg	Lng	TDs	FF	FR
2020	GB	13	10	80	49	31	1.0	0	0	0	0	0	0	1	0
2021	GB	16	13	81	58	23	1.0	4	0	0	0	0	0	0	2
2022	GB	6	1	29	17	12	1.0	0	0	0	0	0	0	0	0
2023	ARI	16	6	55	35	20	0.0	6	1	46	46.0	46	0	0	0
2024	ARI	17	0	35	19	16	2.0	0	0	0	0.0	0	0	0	0
2025	CAR	7	3	23	6	17	0.5	0	0	0	0.0	0	0	0	0
Total		75	33	303	184	119	5.5	10	1	46	46.0	46	0	1	2
Source: pro-football-reference.com

=== Postseason ===
Year	Team	GP	GS	Tackles				Interceptions						Fumbles	
Year	Team	GP	GS	Total	Solo	Ast	Sck	PDef	Int	Yds	Avg	Lng	TDs	FF	FR
2020	GB	2	2	13	8	5	0.0	1	0	0	0	0	0	0	0
2021	GB	1	1	7	4	3	0.0	0	0	0	0	0	0	0	0
Total		3	3	20	12	8	0.0	1	0	0	0	0	0	0	0
Source: pro-football-reference.com
