= 2020 Green Bay Packers season =

102nd season in franchise history

- Owner: Green Bay Packers, Inc.
- General manager: Brian Gutekunst
- Head coach: Matt LaFleur
- Offensive coordinator: Nathaniel Hackett
- Defensive coordinator: Mike Pettine
- Home stadium: Lambeau Field

Results
- Record: 13–3
- Division place: 1st NFC North
- Playoffs: Won Divisional Playoffs (vs. Rams) 32–18; Lost NFC Championship (vs. Buccaneers) 26–31
- All-Pros: 6: QB Aaron Rodgers (1st team); WR Davante Adams (1st team); LT David Bakhtiari (1st team); C Corey Linsley (1st team); OLB Za'Darius Smith (2nd team); CB Jaire Alexander (2nd team)
- Pro Bowlers: 7: QB Aaron Rodgers; RB Aaron Jones; WR Davante Adams; LT David Bakhtiari; G Elgton Jenkins; OLB Za'Darius Smith; CB Jaire Alexander

Uniform

The 2020 season was the Green Bay Packers' 100th season in the National Football League (NFL), their 102nd overall and their second under head coach Matt LaFleur.

They matched their 13–3 record and NFC Championship appearance from the last season, clinching homefield advantage in the NFC playoffs for the first time since 2011. Green Bay's offense scored less than 30 points only 4 times during the regular season.

The Packers clinched both their second consecutive playoff berth and NFC North title following a Week 14 win against the Detroit Lions and a Minnesota Vikings loss to the Tampa Bay Buccaneers the same day. With their victory over the Chicago Bears in Week 17, they earned home field advantage, a first round bye, and the No. 1 seed in the NFC playoffs. They would defeat the Los Angeles Rams 32–18 in the Divisional round, but their season ended after a 31–26 defeat to their former division rival and eventual Super Bowl champion Tampa Bay Buccaneers in the NFC Championship Game. Aaron Rodgers won his third NFL MVP at the NFL Honors for his performance in 2020. The Packers' 509 points (31.8 points per game) scored in the regular season is the 2nd highest total in team history (2011 is first with 560 points).

== Player movements ==
=== Free agents ===
Position	Player	Free agency tag	Date signed	2020 team
OT	Bryan Bulaga	UFA	March 31	Los Angeles Chargers
ILB	Blake Martinez	UFA	March 30	New York Giants
CB	Tramon Williams	UFA	November 10	Baltimore Ravens
WR	Geronimo Allison	UFA	April 4	Detroit Lions
K	Mason Crosby	UFA	February 24	Green Bay Packers
TE	Marcedes Lewis	UFA	March 24	Green Bay Packers
OLB	Kyler Fackrell	UFA	April 2	New York Giants
SS	Will Redmond	UFA	March 19	Green Bay Packers
ILB	B. J. Goodson	UFA	March 20	Cleveland Browns
FS	Ibraheim Campbell	UFA	May 1	Tennessee Titans
FB	Danny Vitale	UFA	March 20	New England Patriots
OT	Jared Veldheer	UFA	December 31	Indianapolis Colts
RB	Tyler Ervin	UFA	March 30	Green Bay Packers
WR	Ryan Grant	UFA		
OT	Jason Spriggs	UFA	April 17	Chicago Bears
FB	Malcolm Johnson	RFA		
WR	Jake Kumerow	ERFA	April 25	Green Bay Packers
DE	Tyler Lancaster	ERFA	April 25	Green Bay Packers
WR	Allen Lazard	ERFA	April 27	Green Bay Packers
CB	Chandon Sullivan	ERFA	April 27	Green Bay Packers
TE	Robert Tonyan	ERFA	April 24	Green Bay Packers

=== Additions ===
Position	Player	Former team	Date
OT	Rick Wagner	Detroit Lions	March 17
ILB	Christian Kirksey	Cleveland Browns	March 17
WR	Devin Funchess	Indianapolis Colts	April 2
OLB	Jamal Davis II	Miami Dolphins	April 21
DE	Gerald Willis	Miami Dolphins	April 21
DE	Treyvon Hester	Oakland Raiders	May 1
FB	John Lovett	Kansas City Chiefs	August 5
WR	Malik Turner	Seattle Seahawks	August 12
WR	Travis Fulgham	Detroit Lions	August 15
CB	Parry Nickerson	Jacksonville Jaguars	September 7
NT	Anthony Rush	Philadelphia Eagles	November 30
WR	Tavon Austin	San Francisco 49ers	December 1
NT	Damon Harrison	Seattle Seahawks	December 31
OT	Jared Veldheer	Indianapolis Colts	January 12

=== Subtractions ===
Position	Player	2020 team	Release date
TE	Jimmy Graham	Chicago Bears	March 12
QB	Manny Wilkins		April 27
FB	Jordan Jones		July 31
G	Cole Madison		July 31
QB	Jalen Morton		August 3
FB	Elijah Wellman		August 3
LB	Jamal Davis II		August 10
S	Frankie Griffin		August 12
CB	Marc-Antoine Dequoy		August 15
TE	James Looney		August 15
WR	Darrell Stewart	Carolina Panthers	August 15
OT	Travis Bruffy		August 19
WR	Travis Fulgham	Philadelphia Eagles	August 19
WR	Darrius Shepherd		December 1
NT	Anthony Rush		December 31

=== Draft ===
2020 Green Bay Packers Draft
Round	Selection	Player	Position	College	Notes
1	26	Jordan Love	QB	Utah State	(Note: Miami traded a first-round selection to Green Bay in exchange for a first- and fourth-round selection.)
2	62	A. J. Dillon	RB	Boston College	
3	94	Josiah Deguara	TE	Cincinnati	
5	175	Kamal Martin	LB	Minnesota	
6	192	Jon Runyan Jr.	G	Michigan	(Note: Las Vegas, then based in Oakland, traded a sixth-round selection to Green Bay in exchange for wide receiver Trevor Davis.)
6	208	Jake Hanson	C	Oregon	(Note: Tennessee, traded a sixth-round selection to Green Bay in exchange for linebacker Reggie Gilbert.)
6	209	Simon Stepaniak	G	Indiana	
7	236	Vernon Scott	FS	TCU	(Note: Green Bay swapped seventh round picks with the New York Giants in exchange for linebacker B. J. Goodson and swapped seventh round picks with the Cleveland Browns in exchange for guard Justin McCray.)
7	242	Jonathan Garvin	DE	Miami	(Note: Baltimore traded a seventh-round selection to Green Bay in exchange for running back Ty Montgomery.)

=== Undrafted free agent additions ===
2020 Undrafted Free Agents
Position	Player	College	Date
ILB	Krys Barnes	UCLA	April 29
SS	Henry Black	Baylor	April 29
OT	Travis Bruffy	Texas Tech	April 29
CB	Marc-Antoine Dequoy	Montreal	April 29
OLB	Tipa Galeai	Utah State	April 29
S	Frankie Griffin	Texas State	April 29
G	Zack Johnson	North Dakota State	April 29
FB	Jordan Jones	Prairie View A&M	April 29
QB	Jalen Morton	Prairie View A&M	April 29
NT	Willington Previlon	Rutgers	April 29
CB	Stanford Samuels III	Florida State	April 29
OLB	Delontae Scott	Irving	April 29
WR	Darrell Stewart Jr.	Michigan State	April 29
CB	Will Sunderland	Troy	April 29
RB	Patrick Taylor	Memphis	April 29

=== Roster cuts ===
The roster was cut to 53 on September 5, 2020.

Position	Player	2020 team
CB	DaShaun Amos	Aviators
LB	Krys Barnes	Green Bay Packers
TE	Evan Baylis	Arizona Cardinals
WR	Reggie Begelton	Green Bay Packers
SS	Henry Black	Green Bay Packers
OT	Cody Conway	
RB	Damarea Crockett	Denver Broncos
LB	Tipa Galeai	Green Bay Packers
C	Jake Hanson	Green Bay Packers
G	Zack Johnson	
WR	Jake Kumerow	Buffalo Bills
OT	John Leglue	
OT	Alex Light	Arizona Cardinals
FB	John Lovett	Green Bay Packers
DE	Willington Previlon	
ILB	Greg Roberts	
CB	Stanford Samuels III	Green Bay Packers
OLB	Delontae Scott	
WR	Darrius Shepherd	
WR	Malik Turner	Dallas Cowboys
RB	Dexter Williams	Green Bay Packers
OLB	Tim Williams	Seattle Seahawks

== Staff ==
2020 Green Bay Packers staff
Front office: Owner: Publicly held corporation; Executive committee – Board of directors; President/CEO – Mark Murphy; General manager – Brian Gutekunst; Executive vice president/director of football operations – Russ Ball; Co-director of player personnel – John Wojciechowski; Co-director of player personnel – Jon-Eric Sullivan; Director - football operations – Milt Hendrickson; Director of college scouting – Matt Malaspina; National scout – Sam Seale; Director of performance psychology/team behavioral health clinician – Chris Carr; Director of player engagement – Grey Ruegamer; Head coaches: Head coach – Matt LaFleur; Offensive coaches: Offensive coordinator – Nathaniel Hackett; Quarterbacks/passing game coordinator – Luke Getsy; Running backs – Ben Sirmans; Wide receivers – Jason Vrable; Tight ends – Justin Outten; Offensive line – Adam Stenavich; Assistant offensive line – Luke Butkus; Offensive quality control – Kevin Koger; Offensive quality control – Connor Lewis; Coaching assistant – Ruvell Martin	Defensive coaches: Defensive coordinator – Mike Pettine; Defensive line – Jerry Montgomery; Outside linebackers – Mike Smith; Inside linebackers – Kirk Olivadotti; Defensive backs – Jerry Gray; Assistant defensive backs – Ryan Downard; Defensive quality control – Wendel Davis; Defensive quality control – Christian Parker; Senior analyst – Butch Barry; Special teams coaches: Special teams coordinator – Shawn Mennenga; Assistant special teams – Maurice Drayton; Special teams quality control – Rayna Stewart; Strength and conditioning: Strength and conditioning coordinator – Chris Gizzi; Strength and conditioning assistant – Thadeus Jackson; Strength and conditioning assistant – Mark Lovat; Strength and conditioning assistant – Grant Thorne

== Final roster ==
2020 Green Bay Packers roster
Quarterbacks (QB): 8 Tim Boyle; 10 Jordan Love; 12 Aaron Rodgers; Running backs (RB): 28 A. J. Dillon; 33 Aaron Jones; 30 Jamaal Williams; Wide receivers (WR): 17 Davante Adams; 16 Tavon Austin; 13 Allen Lazard; 19 Equanimeous St. Brown; 86 Malik Taylor; 83 Marquez Valdes-Scantling; Tight ends (TE): 49 Dominique Dafney; 89 Marcedes Lewis; 87 Jace Sternberger; 85 Robert Tonyan	Offensive linemen (OL): 64 Ben Braden G; 74 Elgton Jenkins G/C/T; 63 Corey Linsley C; 73 Yosh Nijman T; 62 Lucas Patrick G; 76 Jon Runyan Jr. G; 77 Billy Turner T/G; 71 Rick Wagner T; Defensive linemen (DL): 97 Kenny Clark NT; 98 Damon Harrison NT; 96 Kingsley Keke DE; 95 Tyler Lancaster DE/NT; 94 Dean Lowry DE	Linebackers (LB): 51 Krys Barnes ILB; 42 Oren Burks ILB; 53 Jonathan Garvin OLB; 52 Rashan Gary OLB; 58 Christian Kirksey ILB; 54 Kamal Martin ILB; 56 Randy Ramsey OLB; 91 Preston Smith OLB; 55 Za'Darius Smith OLB; 44 Ty Summers ILB; Defensive backs (DB): 23 Jaire Alexander CB; 31 Adrian Amos SS; 41 Henry Black SS; 29 Ka'dar Hollman CB; 37 Josh Jackson CB; 20 Kevin King CB; 25 Will Redmond FS; 26 Darnell Savage FS; 36 Vernon Scott FS/SS; 39 Chandon Sullivan CB; Special teams (ST): 43 Hunter Bradley LS; 2 Mason Crosby K; 6 J. K. Scott P	Practice squad: 84 Reggie Begelton WR; 50 Tipa Galeai OLB; 67 Jake Hanson C (PS/I); 59 De'Jon Harris ILB; 68 Zack Johnson G; 9 J. J. Molson K; 82 Isaac Nauta TE; 99 Willington Previlon DE; 78 Brian Price NT; 11 Seth Roberts WR; 79 Anthony Rush NT; 34 KeiVarae Russell CB; 46 Stanford Samuels III CB; 75 Delontae Scott OLB (PS/I); 40 Mike Weber RB; 38 Tramon Williams CB; 88 Juwann Winfree WR; 7 Ryan Winslow P; Reserve: 90 Montravius Adams DE (IR); 69 David Bakhtiari T (IR); 57 James Burgess ILB (IR); 81 Josiah Deguara TE (IR); 48 Kabion Ento CB (IR); 32 Tyler Ervin RB (IR); 11 Devin Funchess WR (Opt-out); 24 Raven Greene FS (IR); 45 John Lovett TE (IR); 35 Parry Nickerson CB (IR); 72 Simon Stepaniak G (IR); 65 Lane Taylor G (IR); 27 Patrick Taylor RB (NF-Inj.); 70 Jared Veldheer T (COVID-19); 93 Billy Winn DE (IR); Rookies in italics 52 active, 15 reserve, 16 practice squad (2 exempt)

== Preseason ==
The Packers' preseason schedule was announced on May 7, but was later cancelled due to the COVID-19 pandemic.

Week	Date	Opponent	Venue	Result
1	August 15	Arizona Cardinals	Lambeau Field	Canceled due to the COVID-19 pandemic
2	August 22	Cleveland Browns	Lambeau Field	Canceled due to the COVID-19 pandemic
3	August 29	at New York Giants	MetLife Stadium	Canceled due to the COVID-19 pandemic
4	September 3	at Kansas City Chiefs	Arrowhead Stadium	Canceled due to the COVID-19 pandemic

== Regular season ==
=== Schedule ===
The Packers' 2020 schedule was announced on May 7.

Week	Date	Opponent	Result	Record	Venue	Recap
1	September 13	at **Minnesota Vikings**	**W** 43–34	1–0	U.S. Bank Stadium	Recap
2	September 20	**Detroit Lions**	**W** 42–21	2–0	Lambeau Field	Recap
3	September 27	at New Orleans Saints	**W** 37–30	3–0	Mercedes-Benz Superdome	Recap
4	October 5	Atlanta Falcons	**W** 30–16	4–0	Lambeau Field	Recap
5	Bye					
6	October 18	at Tampa Bay Buccaneers	**L** 10–38	4–1	Raymond James Stadium	Recap
7	October 25	at Houston Texans	**W** 35–20	5–1	NRG Stadium	Recap
8	November 1	**Minnesota Vikings**	**L** 22–28	5–2	Lambeau Field	Recap
9	November 5	at San Francisco 49ers	**W** 34–17	6–2	Levi's Stadium	Recap
10	November 15	Jacksonville Jaguars	**W** 24–20	7–2	Lambeau Field	Recap
11	November 22	at Indianapolis Colts	**L** 31–34 (OT)	7–3	Lucas Oil Stadium	Recap
12	November 29	**Chicago Bears**	**W** 41–25	8–3	Lambeau Field	Recap
13	December 6	Philadelphia Eagles	**W** 30–16	9–3	Lambeau Field	Recap
14	December 13	at **Detroit Lions**	**W** 31–24	10–3	Ford Field	Recap
15	December 19	Carolina Panthers	**W** 24–16	11–3	Lambeau Field	Recap
16	December 27	Tennessee Titans	**W** 40–14	12–3	Lambeau Field	Recap
17	January 3, 2021	at **Chicago Bears**	**W** 35–16	13–3	Soldier Field	Recap

Note: Intra-division opponents are in bold text.

=== Game summaries ===
==== Week 1: at Minnesota Vikings ====
Week 1: Green Bay Packers at Minnesota Vikings – Game summary

Quarter	1	2	3	4	Total
**Packers**	3	19	7	14	**43**
Vikings	7	3	0	24	**34**

at U.S. Bank Stadium, Minneapolis, Minnesota

- Date: September 13
- Game time: 12:00 p.m. CDT
- Game weather: None (indoor stadium)
- Game attendance: 0
- Referee: Bill Vinovich
- TV announcers (Fox): Chris Myers, Greg Jennings, Brock Huard and Jen Hale
- Recap, Game Book

Game information

**First quarter**

- GB – Mason Crosby 31-yard field goal, 7:27. Packers 3–0. **Drive: 13 plays, 63 yards, 7:33.**
- MIN – Dalvin Cook 1-yard run (Dan Bailey kick), 3:24. Vikings 7–3. **Drive: 8 plays, 75 yards, 4:03.**

**Second quarter**

- GB – Kirk Cousins tackled in the end zone by Jaire Alexander for a safety, 11:39. Vikings 7–5.
- GB – Mason Crosby 43-yard field goal, 8:08. Packers 8–7. **Drive: 8 plays, 31 yards, 3:31.**
- GB – Davante Adams 24-yard pass from Aaron Rodgers (Mason Crosby kick), 0:39. Packers 15–7. **Drive: 11 plays, 60 yards, 5:25.**
- GB – Marquez Valdes-Scantling 45-yard pass from Aaron Rodgers (Mason Crosby kick), 0:14. Packers 22–7. **Drive: 2 plays, 45 yards, 0:11.**
- MIN – Dan Bailey 35-yard field goal, 0:00. Packers 22–10. **Drive: 3 plays, 58 yards, 0:14.**

**Third quarter**

- GB – Davante Adams 1-yard pass from Aaron Rodgers (Mason Crosby kick), 0:09. Packers 29–10. **Drive: 8 plays, 61 yards, 4:11.**

**Fourth quarter**

- MIN – Adam Thielen 37-yard pass from Kirk Cousins (Dalvin Cook run), 13:53. Packers 29–18. **Drive: 4 plays, 77 yards, 1:16.**
- GB – Allen Lazard 4-yard pass from Aaron Rodgers (Mason Crosby kick), 10:02. Packers 36–18. **Drive: 7 plays, 75 yards, 3:51.**
- MIN – Dalvin Cook 3-yard run (Dalvin Cook run), 7:55. Packers 36–26. **Drive: 7 plays, 65 yards, 2:07.**
- GB – Aaron Jones 5-yard run (Mason Crosby kick), 3:19. Packers 43–26. **Drive: 8 plays, 75 yards, 4:36.**
- MIN – Adam Thielen 19-yard pass from Kirk Cousins (Adam Thielen pass from Kirk Cousins), 1:21. Packers 43–34. **Drive: 9 plays, 75 yards, 1:58.**

**Top passers**

- GB – Aaron Rodgers – 32/44, 364 yards, 4 TD
- MIN – Kirk Cousins – 19/25, 259 yards, 2 TD, INT

**Top rushers**

- GB – Aaron Jones – 16 rushes, 66 yards, TD
- MIN – Dalvin Cook – 12 rushes, 50 yards, 2 TD

**Top receivers**

- GB – Davante Adams – 14 receptions, 156 yards, 2 TD
- MIN – Adam Thielen – 6 receptions, 110 yards, 2 TD

==== Week 2: vs. Detroit Lions ====
Week 2: Detroit Lions at Green Bay Packers – Game summary

Quarter	1	2	3	4	Total
Lions	14	0	0	7	**21**
**Packers**	3	14	17	8	**42**

at Lambeau Field, Green Bay, Wisconsin

- Date: September 20
- Game time: 12:00 p.m. CDT
- Game weather: Sunny, 66 °F (19 °C)
- Game attendance: 0
- Referee: Clete Blakeman
- TV announcers (Fox): Chris Myers, Greg Jennings, Brock Huard and Jen Hale
- Recap, Game Book

Game information

**First quarter**

- DET – Kerryon Johnson 1-yard run (Matt Prater kick), 10:33. Lions 7–0. **Drive: 8 plays, 75 yards, 4:27.**
- GB – Mason Crosby 43-yard field goal, 5:42. Lions 7–3. **Drive: 12 plays, 50 yards, 4:51.**
- DET – Marvin Jones 4-yard pass from Matthew Stafford (Matt Prater kick), 0:04. Lions 14–3. **Drive: 13 plays, 75 yards, 5:38.**

**Second quarter**

- GB – Aaron Jones 7-yard pass from Aaron Rodgers (Mason Crosby kick), 10:09. Lions 14–10. **Drive: 9 plays, 75 yards, 4:55.**
- GB – Robert Tonyan 11-yard pass from Aaron Rodgers (Mason Crosby kick), 0:14. Packers 17–14. **Drive: 4 plays, 62 yards, 0:46.**

**Third quarter**

- GB – Aaron Jones 75-yard run (Mason Crosby kick), 14:48. Packers 24–14. **Drive: 1 play, 75 yards, 0:12.**
- GB – Chandon Sullivan 7-yard interception return (Mason Crosby kick), 8:32. Packers 31–14.
- GB – Mason Crosby 35-yard field goal, 1:33. Packers 34–14. **Drive: 12 plays, 69 yards, 6:01.**

**Fourth quarter**

- DET – Marvin Hall 24-yard pass from Matthew Stafford (Matt Prater kick), 13:00. Packers 34–21. **Drive: 8 plays, 75 yards, 3:32.**
- GB – Aaron Jones 14-yard run (Jamaal Williams run), 7:59. Packers 42–21. **Drive: 7 plays, 74 yards, 5:01.**

**Top passers**

- DET – Matthew Stafford – 20/33, 244 yards, 2 TD, INT
- GB – Aaron Rodgers – 18/30, 240 yards, 2 TD

**Top rushers**

- DET – Adrian Peterson – 7 rushes, 41 yards
- GB – Aaron Jones – 18 rushes, 168 yards, 2 TD

**Top receivers**

- DET – T. J. Hockenson – 4 receptions, 62 yards
- GB – Aaron Jones – 4 receptions, 68 yards, TD

==== Week 3: at New Orleans Saints ====
Week 3: Green Bay Packers at New Orleans Saints – Game summary

Quarter	1	2	3	4	Total
**Packers**	3	10	14	10	**37**
Saints	7	10	10	3	**30**

at Mercedes-Benz Superdome, New Orleans, Louisiana

- Date: September 27
- Game time: 7:20 p.m. CDT
- Game weather: None (indoor stadium)
- Game attendance: 0
- Referee: Brad Rogers
- TV announcers (NBC): Mike Tirico, Cris Collinsworth, Michele Tafoya and Terry McAulay
- Recap, Game Book

Game information

**First quarter**

- GB – Mason Crosby 52-yard field goal, 7:30. Packers 3–0. **Drive: 10 plays, 35 yards, 5:38.**
- NO – Alvin Kamara 11-yard pass from Drew Brees (Wil Lutz kick), 7:30. Saints 7–3. **Drive: 4 plays, 77 yards, 2:23.**

**Second quarter**

- GB – Mason Crosby 33-yard field goal, 14:12. Saints 7–6. **Drive: 12 plays, 60 yards, 5:55.**
- GB – Allen Lazard 5-yard pass from Aaron Rodgers (Mason Crosby kick), 10:32. Packers 13–7. **Drive: 3 plays, 50 yards, 1:27.**
- NO – Wil Lutz 45-yard field goal, 4:28. Packers 13–10. **Drive: 11 plays, 49 yards, 6:04.**
- NO – Emmanuel Sanders 10-yard pass from Drew Brees (Wil Lutz kick), 0:06. Saints 17–13. **Drive: 11 plays, 61 yards, 2:34.**

**Third quarter**

- GB – Aaron Jones 1-yard run (Mason Crosby kick), 12:58. Packers 20–17. **Drive: 7 plays, 75 yards, 2:02.**
- NO – Wil Lutz 35-yard field goal, 5:55. Tied 20–20. **Drive: 12 plays, 58 yards, 7:03.**
- GB – Marcedes Lewis 18-yard pass from Aaron Rodgers (Mason Crosby kick), 2:17. Packers 27–20. **Drive: 6 plays, 75 yards, 3:38.**
- NO – Alvin Kamara 52-yard pass from Drew Brees (Wil Lutz kick), 0:33. Tied 27–27. **Drive: 3 plays, 75 yards, 1:44.**

**Fourth quarter**

- GB – Mason Crosby 47-yard field goal, 8:47. Packers 30–27. **Drive: 7 plays, 26 yards, 3:32.**
- GB – Robert Tonyan 1-yard pass from Aaron Rodgers (Mason Crosby kick), 2:00. Packers 37–27. **Drive: 7 plays, 64 yards, 4:36.**
- NO – Wil Lutz 34-yard field goal, 0:32. Packers 37–30. **Drive: 9 plays, 59 yards, 1:28.**

**Top passers**

- GB – Aaron Rodgers – 21/32, 283 yards, 3 TD
- NO – Drew Brees – 29/36, 288 yards, 3 TD

**Top rushers**

- GB – Aaron Jones – 16 rushes, 69 yards, TD
- NO – Latavius Murray – 12 rushes, 58 yards

**Top receivers**

- GB – Allen Lazard – 6 receptions, 146 yards, TD
- NO – Alvin Kamara – 13 receptions, 139 yards, 2 TD

==== Week 4: vs. Atlanta Falcons ====
Week 4: Atlanta Falcons at Green Bay Packers – Game summary

Quarter	1	2	3	4	Total
Falcons	0	3	6	7	**16**
**Packers**	7	13	7	3	**30**

at Lambeau Field, Green Bay, Wisconsin

- Date: October 5
- Game time: 8:00 p.m. CDT
- Game weather: Clear, 53 °F (12 °C)
- Game attendance: 0
- Referee: Carl Cheffers
- TV announcers (ESPN): Steve Levy, Brian Griese, Louis Riddick, Lisa Salters and John Parry
- Recap, Game Book

Game information

**First quarter**

- GB – Aaron Jones 6-yard pass from Aaron Rodgers (Mason Crosby kick), 10:01. Packers 7–0. **Drive: 7 plays, 73 yards, 3:32.**

**Second quarter**

- ATL – Elliott Fry 23-yard field goal, 7:38. Packers 7–3. **Drive: 20 plays, 94 yards, 10:36.**
- GB – Robert Tonyan 19-yard pass from Aaron Rodgers (kick failed), 2:28. Packers 13–3. **Drive: 11 plays, 75 yards, 5:10.**
- GB – Robert Tonyan 8-yard pass from Aaron Rodgers (Mason Crosby kick), 0:46. Packers 20–3. **Drive: 7 plays, 50 yards, 0:51.**

**Third quarter**

- ATL – Todd Gurley 5-yard run (kick failed), 7:20. Packers 20–9. **Drive: 8 plays, 67 yards, 4:22.**
- GB – Robert Tonyan 21-yard pass from Aaron Rodgers (Mason Crosby kick), 5:18. Packers 27–9. **Drive: 4 plays, 51 yards, 2:02.**

**Fourth quarter**

- ATL – Todd Gurley 3-yard run (Elliott Fry kick), 12:52. Packers 27–16. **Drive: 13 plays, 75 yards, 7:26.**
- GB – Mason Crosby 48-yard field goal, 5:55. Packers 30–16. **Drive: 10 plays, 45 yards, 6:57.**

**Top passers**

- ATL – Matt Ryan – 28/39, 285 yards
- GB – Aaron Rodgers – 27/33, 327 yards, 4 TD

**Top rushers**

- ATL – Todd Gurley – 16 rushes, 57 yards, 2 TD
- GB – Aaron Jones – 15 rushes, 71 yards

**Top receivers**

- ATL – Olamide Zaccheaus – 8 receptions, 86 yards
- GB – Robert Tonyan – 6 receptions, 98 yards, 3 TD

==== Week 6: at Tampa Bay Buccaneers ====
Week 6: Green Bay Packers at Tampa Bay Buccaneers – Game summary

Quarter	1	2	3	4	Total
Packers	10	0	0	0	**10**
**Buccaneers**	0	28	10	0	**38**

at Raymond James Stadium, Tampa, Florida

- Date: October 18
- Game time: 4:25 p.m. EDT/3:25 p.m. CDT
- Game weather: Cloudy, 88 °F (31 °C)
- Game attendance: 15,540
- Referee: Jerome Boger
- TV announcers (Fox): Joe Buck, Troy Aikman and Erin Andrews
- Recap, Game Book

Game information

**First quarter**

- GB – Mason Crosby 39-yard field goal, 10:27. Packers 3–0. **Drive: 10 plays, 54 yards, 4:33.**
- GB – Aaron Jones 1-yard run (Mason Crosby kick), 0:48. Packers 10–0. **Drive: 11 plays, 80 yards, 7:32.**

**Second quarter**

- TB – Jamel Dean 32-yard interception return (Ryan Succop kick), 12:42. Packers 10–7.
- TB – Ronald Jones 2-yard run (Ryan Succop kick), 11:02. Buccaneers 14–10. **Drive: 1 play, 2 yards, 0:03.**
- TB – Tyler Johnson 7-yard pass from Tom Brady (Ryan Succop kick), 4:35. Buccaneers 21–10. **Drive: 11 plays, 65 yards, 6:05.**
- TB – Rob Gronkowski 12-yard pass from Tom Brady (Ryan Succop kick), 1:02. Buccaneers 28–10. **Drive: 7 plays, 62 yards, 1:40.**

**Third quarter**

- TB – Ryan Succop 50-yard field goal, 12:14. Buccaneers 31–10. **Drive: 6 plays, 43 yards, 2:46.**
- TB – Ronald Jones 1-yard run (Ryan Succop kick), 2:40. Buccaneers 38–10. **Drive: 7 plays, 85 yards, 2:47.**

**Fourth quarter**

- No scoring plays.

**Top passers**

- GB – Aaron Rodgers – 16/35, 160 yards, 2 INT
- TB – Tom Brady – 17/27, 166 yards, 2 TD

**Top rushers**

- GB – Jamaal Williams – 4 rushes, 34 yards
- TB – Ronald Jones – 23 rushes, 113 yards, 2 TD

**Top receivers**

- GB – Davante Adams – 6 receptions, 61 yards
- TB – Rob Gronkowski – 5 receptions, 78 yards, TD

==== Week 7: at Houston Texans ====
Week 7: Green Bay Packers at Houston Texans – Game summary

Quarter	1	2	3	4	Total
**Packers**	7	14	7	7	**35**
Texans	0	0	7	13	**20**

at NRG Stadium, Houston, Texas

- Date: October 25
- Game time: 12:00 p.m. CDT
- Game weather: None (retractable roof closed)
- Game attendance: 12,618
- Referee: Clay Martin
- TV announcers (Fox): Kenny Albert, Jonathan Vilma and Shannon Spake
- Recap, Game Book

Game information

**First quarter**

- GB – Davante Adams 3-yard pass from Aaron Rodgers (Mason Crosby kick), 9:21. Packers 7–0. **Drive: 10 plays, 75 yards, 5:39.**

**Second quarter**

- GB – Jace Sternberger 3-yard pass from Aaron Rodgers (Mason Crosby kick), 13:33. Packers 14–0. **Drive: 9 plays, 88 yards, 4:37.**
- GB – Malik Taylor 1-yard pass from Aaron Rodgers (Mason Crosby kick), 0:14. Packers 21–0. **Drive: 9 plays, 69 yards, 2:24.**

**Third quarter**

- HOU – David Johnson 3-yard pass from Deshaun Watson (Kaʻimi Fairbairn kick), 8:55. Packers 21–7. **Drive: 11 plays, 75 yards, 6:05.**
- GB – Davante Adams 45-yard pass from Aaron Rodgers (Mason Crosby kick), 4:44. Packers 28–7. **Drive: 8 plays, 75 yards, 4:11.**

**Fourth quarter**

- HOU – Kaʻimi Fairbairn 38-yard field goal, 14:12. Packers 28–10. **Drive: 7 plays, 47 yards, 3:36.**
- HOU – Kaʻimi Fairbairn 29-yard field goal, 9:56. Packers 28–13. **Drive: 7 plays, 11 yards, 2:12.**
- GB – Jamaal Williams 1-yard run (Mason Crosby kick), 3:40. Packers 35–13. **Drive: 7 plays, 46 yards, 3:18.**
- HOU – Will Fuller 6-yard pass from Deshaun Watson (Kaʻimi Fairbairn kick), 1:33. Packers 35–20. **Drive: 9 plays, 75 yards, 2:07.**

**Top passers**

- GB – Aaron Rodgers – 23/34, 283 yards, 4 TD
- HOU – Deshaun Watson – 29/39, 309 yards, 2 TD

**Top rushers**

- GB – Jamaal Williams – 19 rushes, 66 yards, TD
- HOU – David Johnson – 14 rushes, 42 yards

**Top receivers**

- GB – Davante Adams – 13 receptions, 196 yards, 2 TD
- HOU – Randall Cobb – 8 receptions, 95 yards

==== Week 8: vs. Minnesota Vikings ====
Week 8: Minnesota Vikings at Green Bay Packers – Game summary

Quarter	1	2	3	4	Total
**Vikings**	7	7	14	0	**28**
Packers	7	7	0	8	**22**

at Lambeau Field, Green Bay, Wisconsin

- Date: November 1
- Game time: 12:00 p.m. CST
- Game weather: Cloudy and windy, 34 °F (1 °C)
- Game attendance: 0
- Referee: Alex Kemp
- TV announcers (Fox): Kevin Burkhardt, Daryl Johnston and Pam Oliver
- Recap, Game Book

Game information

**First quarter**

- GB – Davante Adams 5-yard pass from Aaron Rodgers (Mason Crosby kick), 7:01. Packers 7–0. **Drive: 13 plays, 75 yards, 7:59.**
- MIN – Dalvin Cook 21-yard run (Dan Bailey kick), 0:47. Tied 7–7. **Drive: 10 plays, 73 yards, 6:14.**

**Second quarter**

- GB – Davante Adams 1-yard pass from Aaron Rodgers (Mason Crosby kick), 6:53. Packers 14–7. **Drive: 15 plays, 72 yards, 8:54.**
- MIN – Dalvin Cook 1-yard run (Dan Bailey kick), 0:31. Tied 14–14. **Drive: 12 plays, 56 yards, 6:22.**

**Third quarter**

- MIN – Dalvin Cook 1-yard run (Dan Bailey kick), 10:00. Vikings 21–14. **Drive: 10 plays, 85 yards, 5:00.**
- MIN – Dalvin Cook 50-yard pass from Kirk Cousins (Dan Bailey kick), 5:52. Vikings 28–14. **Drive: 4 plays, 63 yards, 2:06.**

**Fourth quarter**

- GB – Davante Adams 7-yard pass from Aaron Rodgers (Jamaal Williams run), 2:42. Vikings 28–22. **Drive: 9 plays, 74 yards, 3:05.**

**Top passers**

- MIN – Kirk Cousins – 11/14, 160 yards, TD
- GB – Aaron Rodgers – 27/41, 291 yards, 3 TD

**Top rushers**

- MIN – Dalvin Cook – 30 rushes, 163 yards, 3 TD
- GB – Jamaal Williams – 16 rushes, 75 yards

**Top receivers**

- MIN – Dalvin Cook – 2 receptions, 63 yards, TD
- GB – Robert Tonyan – 5 receptions, 79 yards

==== Week 9: at San Francisco 49ers ====
Week 9: Green Bay Packers at San Francisco 49ers – Game summary

Quarter	1	2	3	4	Total
**Packers**	7	14	10	3	**34**
49ers	3	0	0	14	**17**

at Levi's Stadium, Santa Clara, California

- Date: November 5
- Game time: 5:20 p.m. PST/7:20 p.m. CST
- Game weather: Sunny, 78 °F (26 °C)
- Game attendance: 0
- Referee: Bill Vinovich
- TV announcers (Fox/NFLN/Amazon Prime): Joe Buck, Troy Aikman, Erin Andrews and Kristina Pink
- Recap, Game Book

Game information

**First quarter**

- GB – Davante Adams 36-yard pass from Aaron Rodgers (Mason Crosby kick), 11:42. Packers 7–0. **Drive: 6 plays, 75 yards, 3:18.**
- SF – Robbie Gould 22-yard field goal, 0:47. Packers 7–3. **Drive: 11 plays, 76 yards, 6:11.**

**Second quarter**

- GB – Marcedes Lewis 1-yard pass from Aaron Rodgers (Mason Crosby kick), 7:01. Packers 14–3. **Drive: 9 plays, 38 yards, 4:41.**
- GB – Marquez Valdes-Scantling 52-yard pass from Aaron Rodgers (Mason Crosby kick), 1:53. Packers 21–3. **Drive: 8 plays, 87 yards, 3:33.**

**Third quarter**

- GB – Marquez Valdes-Scantling 1-yard pass from Aaron Rodgers (Mason Crosby kick), 7:17. Packers 28–3. **Drive: 9 plays, 80 yards, 6:00.**
- GB – Mason Crosby 19-yard field goal, 2:01. Packers 31–3. **Drive: 7 plays, 46 yards, 3:26.**

**Fourth quarter**

- GB – Mason Crosby 53-yard field goal, 6:15. Packers 34–3. **Drive: 12 plays, 60 yards, 8:14.**
- SF – Richie James 41-yard pass from Nick Mullens (Robbie Gould kick), 5:00. Packers 34–10. **Drive: 4 plays, 80 yards, 1:15.**
- SF – Jerick McKinnon 1-yard run (Robbie Gould kick), 0:04. Packers 34–17. **Drive: 10 plays, 75 yards, 2:35.**

**Top passers**

- GB – Aaron Rodgers – 25/31, 305 yards, 4 TD
- SF – Nick Mullens – 22/35, 291 yards, TD, INT

**Top rushers**

- GB – Aaron Jones – 15 rushes, 58 yards
- SF – Jerick McKinnon – 12 rushes, 52 yards, TD

**Top receivers**

- GB – Davante Adams – 10 receptions, 173 yards, TD
- SF – Richie James – 9 receptions, 184 yards, TD

==== Week 10: vs. Jacksonville Jaguars ====
Week 10: Jacksonville Jaguars at Green Bay Packers – Game summary

Quarter	1	2	3	4	Total
Jaguars	3	7	7	3	**20**
**Packers**	0	17	0	7	**24**

at Lambeau Field, Green Bay, Wisconsin

- Date: November 15
- Game time: 12:00 p.m. CST
- Game weather: Cloudy, 38 °F (3 °C)
- Game attendance: 0
- Referee: Shawn Smith
- TV announcers (Fox): Chris Myers, Greg Jennings, Brock Huard and Jen Hale
- Recap, Game Book

Game information

**First quarter**

- JAX – Chase McLaughlin 52-yard field goal, 10:36. Jaguars 3–0. **Drive: 7 plays, 29 yards, 2:46.**

**Second quarter**

- GB – Marquez Valdes-Scantling 78-yard pass from Aaron Rodgers (Mason Crosby kick), 14:47. Packers 7–3. **Drive: 4 plays, 91 yards, 2:00.**
- JAX – Keelan Cole 91-yard punt return (Chase McLaughlin kick), 10:06. Jaguars 10–7.
- GB – Aaron Rodgers 5-yard run (Mason Crosby kick), 2:15. Packers 14–10. **Drive: 13 plays, 81 yards, 7:51.**
- GB – Mason Crosby 39-yard field goal, 0:02. Packers 17–10. **Drive: 6 plays, 5 yards, 1:26.**

**Third quarter**

- JAX – Keelan Cole 12-yard pass from Jake Luton (Chase McLaughlin kick), 10:30. Tied 17–17. **Drive: 3 plays, 16 yards, 1:26.**

**Fourth quarter**

- JAX – Chase McLaughlin 31-yard field goal, 12:40. Jaguars 20–17. **Drive: 7 plays, 43 yards, 3:36.**
- GB – Davante Adams 6-yard pass from Aaron Rodgers (Mason Crosby kick), 9:03. Packers 24–20. **Drive: 7 plays, 75 yards, 3:37.**

**Top passers**

- JAX – Jake Luton – 18/35, 169 yards, TD, INT
- GB – Aaron Rodgers – 24/34, 325 yards, 2 TD, INT

**Top rushers**

- JAX – James Robinson – 23 rushes, 109 yards
- GB – Aaron Jones – 13 rushes, 46 yards

**Top receivers**

- JAX – D. J. Chark – 4 receptions, 56 yards
- GB – Marquez Valdes-Scantling – 4 receptions, 149 yards, TD

==== Week 11: at Indianapolis Colts ====
Week 11: Green Bay Packers at Indianapolis Colts – Game summary

Quarter	1	2	3	4	OT	Total
Packers	7	21	0	3	0	**31**
**Colts**	7	7	11	6	3	**34**

at Lucas Oil Stadium, Indianapolis, Indiana

- Date: November 22
- Game time: 4:25 p.m. EST/3:25 p.m. CST
- Game weather: None (retractable roof closed)
- Game attendance: 12,495
- Referee: Shawn Hochuli
- TV announcers (Fox): Joe Buck, Troy Aikman and Erin Andrews
- Recap, Game Book

Game information

**First quarter**

- GB – Robert Tonyan 25-yard pass from Aaron Rodgers (Mason Crosby kick), 8:21. Packers 7–0. **Drive: 7 plays, 51 yards, 4:06.**
- IND – Michael Pittman Jr. 45-yard pass from Philip Rivers (Rodrigo Blankenship kick), 5:45. Tied 7–7. **Drive: 5 plays, 75 yards, 2:36.**

**Second quarter**

- GB – Aaron Jones 2-yard run (Mason Crosby kick), 9:55. Packers 14–7. **Drive: 6 plays, 60 yards, 4:14.**
- GB – Davante Adams 5-yard pass from Aaron Rodgers (Mason Crosby kick), 7:48. Packers 21–7. **Drive: 4 plays, 29 yards, 1:53.**
- IND – Trey Burton 17-yard pass from Phillip Rivers (Rodrigo Blankenship kick), 1:52. Packers 21–14. **Drive: 12 plays, 75 yards, 5:56.**
- GB – Jamaal Williams 4-yard pass from Aaron Rodgers (Mason Crosby kick), 0:16. Packers 28–14. **Drive: 6 plays, 75 yards, 1:36.**

**Third quarter**

- IND – Rodrigo Blankenship 37-yard field goal, 7:43. Packers 28–17. **Drive: 14 plays, 56 yards, 7:17.**
- IND – Jack Doyle 6-yard pass from Phillip Rivers (Nyheim Hines run), 1:59. Packers 28–25. **Drive: 10 plays, 55 yards, 3:57.**

**Fourth quarter**

- IND – Rodrigo Blankenship 32-yard field goal, 11:12. Tied 28–28. **Drive: 8 plays, 50 yards, 3:56.**
- IND – Rodrigo Blankenship 43-yard field goal, 8:56. Colts 31–28. **Drive: 4 plays, 3 yards, 2:06.**
- GB – Mason Crosby 39-yard field goal, 0:00. Tied 31–31. **Drive: 10 plays, 86 yards, 1:22.**

**Overtime**

- IND – Rodrigo Blankenship 39-yard field goal, 7:10. Colts 34–31. **Drive: 4 plays, 8 yards, 2:02.**

**Top passers**

- GB – Aaron Rodgers – 27/38, 311 yards, 3 TD, INT
- IND – Phillip Rivers – 24/36, 288 yards, 3 TD, INT

**Top rushers**

- GB – Aaron Jones – 10 rushes, 41 yards, TD
- IND – Jonathan Taylor – 22 rushes, 90 yards

**Top receivers**

- GB – Davante Adams – 7 receptions, 106 yards, TD
- IND – Michael Pittman Jr. – 3 receptions, 66 yards, TD

==== Week 12: vs. Chicago Bears ====
Week 12: Chicago Bears at Green Bay Packers – Game summary

Quarter	1	2	3	4	Total
Bears	3	7	0	15	**25**
**Packers**	6	21	14	0	**41**

at Lambeau Field, Green Bay, Wisconsin

- Date: November 29, 2020
- Game time: 7:20 p.m. CST
- Game weather: Clear, 37 °F (3 °C)
- Game attendance: 0
- Referee: Clete Blakeman
- TV announcers (NBC): Mike Tirico, Tony Dungy, Kathryn Tappen, and Terry McAulay
- Recap, Game Book

Game information

**First quarter**

- GB – Davante Adams 12-yard pass from Aaron Rodgers (Mason Crosby kick missed), 7:22. Packers 6–0. **Drive: 14 plays, 75 yards, 7:38.**
- CHI – Cairo Santos 27-yard field goal, 5:14. Packers 6–3. **Drive: 6 plays, 59 yards, 2:08.**

**Second quarter**

- GB – Marcedes Lewis 5-yard pass from Aaron Rodgers (Mason Crosby kick), 14:55. Packers 13–3. **Drive: 9 plays, 75 yards, 5:19.**
- GB – Allen Lazard 2-yard pass from Aaron Rodgers (Mason Crosby kick), 4:34. Packers 20–3. **Drive: 13 plays, 80 yards, 7:50.**
- GB – Preston Smith 14-yard fumble return (Mason Crosby kick), 3:11. Packers 27–3.
- CHI – Allen Robinson II 1-yard pass from Mitchell Trubisky (Cairo Santos kick), 0:19. Packers 27–10. **Drive: 14 plays, 87 yards, 2:52.**

**Third quarter**

- GB – Robert Tonyan 39-yard pass from Aaron Rodgers (Mason Crosby kick), 6:30. Packers 34–10. **Drive: 4 plays, 53 yards, 2:15.**
- GB – Jamaal Williams 13-yard run (Mason Crosby kick), 1:12. Packers 41–10. **Drive: 9 plays, 66 yards, 4:57.**

**Fourth quarter**

- CHI – Allen Robinson II 6-yard pass from Mitchell Trubisky (Cairo Santos kick), 11:48. Packers 41–17. **Drive: 13 plays, 65 yards, 4:24.**
- CHI – David Montgomery 3-yard pass from Mitchell Trubisky (Mitchell Trubisky-Darnell Mooney pass), 3:21. Packers 41–25. **Drive: 15 plays, 82 yards, 5:16.**

**Top Passers**

- CHI – Mitchell Trubisky – 26/46, 242 yards, 3 TD, 2 INT
- GB – Aaron Rodgers – 21/29, 211 yards, 4 TD

**Top Rushers**

- CHI – David Montgomery – 11 rushes, 103 yards
- GB – Aaron Jones – 17 rushes, 90 yards

**Top Receivers**

- CHI – Allen Robinson II – 8 receptions, 74 yards, 2 TD
- GB – Robert Tonyan – 5 receptions, 67 yards, TD

The Packers secured their 100th victory against the Bears.

==== Week 13: vs. Philadelphia Eagles ====
Week 13: Philadelphia Eagles at Green Bay Packers – Game summary

Quarter	1	2	3	4	Total
Eagles	3	0	0	13	**16**
**Packers**	0	14	6	10	**30**

at Lambeau Field, Green Bay, Wisconsin

- Date: December 6
- Game time: 3:25 p.m. CST
- Game weather: Cloudy, 34 °F (1 °C)
- Game attendance: 0
- Referee: Bill Vinovich
- TV announcers (CBS): Jim Nantz, Tony Romo and Tracy Wolfson
- Recap, Game Book

Game information

**First quarter**

- PHI – Jake Elliott 52-yard field goal, 7:53. Eagles 3–0. **Drive: 15 plays, 41 yards, 7:07.**

**Second quarter**

- GB – Davante Adams 1-yard pass from Aaron Rodgers (Mason Crosby kick), 8:29. Packers 7–3. **Drive: 14 plays, 88 yards, 7:42.**
- GB – Robert Tonyan 25-yard pass from Aaron Rodgers (Mason Crosby kick), 0:57. Packers 14–3. **Drive: 7 plays, 82 yards, 3:46.**

**Third quarter**

- GB – Davante Adams 9-yard pass from Aaron Rodgers (Mason Crosby kick failed), 7:39. Packers 20–3. **Drive: 7 plays, 99 yards, 4:21.**

**Fourth quarter**

- GB – Mason Crosby 40-yard field goal, 11:19. Packers 23–3. **Drive: 14 plays, 72 yards, 7:16.**
- PHI – Greg Ward 32-yard pass from Jalen Hurts (Jake Elliott kick), 7:52. Packers 23–10. **Drive: 9 plays, 73 yards, 3:27.**
- PHI – Jalen Reagor 73-yard punt-return touchdown (Jake Elliott kick failed), 6:30. Packers 23–16.
- GB – Aaron Jones 77-yard run (Mason Crosby kick), 2:36. Packers 30–16. **Drive: 2 plays, 80 yards, 0:21.**

**Top passers**

- PHI – Jalen Hurts – 5/12, 109 yards, TD, INT
- GB – Aaron Rodgers – 25/34, 295 yards, 3 TD

**Top rushers**

- PHI – Miles Sanders – 10 rushes, 31 yards
- GB – Aaron Jones – 15 rushes, 130 yards, TD

**Top receivers**

- PHI – Dallas Goedert – 5 receptions, 66 yards
- GB – Davante Adams – 10 receptions, 121 yards, 2 TD

==== Week 14: at Detroit Lions ====
Week 14: Green Bay Packers at Detroit Lions – Game summary

Quarter	1	2	3	4	Total
**Packers**	7	7	7	10	**31**
Lions	7	7	0	10	**24**

at Ford Field, Detroit, Michigan

- Date: December 13
- Game time: 4:25 p.m. EST/3:25 p.m. CST
- Game weather: None (indoor stadium)
- Game attendance: 0
- Referee: Alex Kemp
- TV announcers (Fox): Adam Amin, Mark Schlereth and Lindsay Czarniak
- Recap, Game Book

Game information

**First quarter**

- DET – T. J. Hockenson 1-yard pass from Matthew Stafford (Matt Prater kick), 9:24. Lions 7–0. **Drive: 11 plays, 75 yards, 5:36.**
- GB – Davante Adams 56-yard pass from Aaron Rodgers (Mason Crosby kick), 8:00. Tied 7–7. **Drive: 3 plays, 75 yards, 1:24.**

**Second quarter**

- GB – Marquez Valdes-Scantling 14-yard pass from Aaron Rodgers (Mason Crosby kick), 14:11. Packers 14–7. **Drive: 12 plays, 69 yards, 7:01.**
- DET – D'Andre Swift 3-yard run (Matt Prater kick), 1:27. Tied 14–14. **Drive: 11 plays, 80 yards, 4:14.**

**Third quarter**

- GB – Aaron Rodgers 6-yard run (Mason Crosby kick), 6:11. Packers 21–14. **Drive: 14 plays, 75 yards, 8:49.**

**Fourth quarter**

- GB – Robert Tonyan 4-yard pass from Aaron Rodgers (Mason Crosby kick), 12:01. Packers 28–14. **Drive: 12 plays, 79 yards, 7:49.**
- DET – Kerryon Johnson 2-yard run (Matt Prater kick), 6:30. Packers 28–21. **Drive: 13 plays, 75 yards, 5:31.**
- GB – Mason Crosby 57-yard field goal, 3:35. Packers 31–21. **Drive: 7 plays, 36 yards, 3:00.**
- DET – Matt Prater 32-yard field goal, 1:49. Packers 31–24. **Drive: 7 plays, 19 yards, 1:41.**

**Top passers**

- GB – Aaron Rodgers – 26/33, 290 yards, 3 TD
- DET – Matthew Stafford – 24/34, 244 yards, TD

**Top rushers**

- GB – Aaron Jones – 15 rushes, 69 yards
- DET – D'Andre Swift – 7 rushes, 24 yards, TD

**Top receivers**

- GB – Davante Adams – 7 receptions, 115 yards, TD
- DET – Danny Amendola – 6 receptions, 66 yards

==== Week 15: vs. Carolina Panthers ====
Week 15: Carolina Panthers at Green Bay Packers – Game summary

Quarter	1	2	3	4	Total
Panthers	3	0	7	6	**16**
**Packers**	7	14	0	3	**24**

at Lambeau Field, Green Bay, Wisconsin

- Date: December 19
- Game time: 7:15 p.m. CST
- Game weather: Cloudy, 33 °F (1 °C)
- Game attendance: 0
- Referee: Alex Kemp
- TV announcers (NFLN): Joe Davis, Kurt Warner and Melissa Stark
- Recap, Game Book

Game information

**First quarter**

- GB – Robert Tonyan 1-yard pass from Aaron Rodgers (Mason Crosby kick), 9:54. Packers 7–0. **Drive: 7 plays, 81 yards, 3:43.**
- CAR – Joey Slye 36-yard field goal, 5:57. Packers 7–3. **Drive: 8 plays, 57 yards, 3:57.**

**Second quarter**

- GB – Aaron Rodgers 6-yard run (Mason Crosby kick), 14:09. Packers 14–3. **Drive: 13 plays, 75 yards, 6:48.**
- GB – Aaron Jones 8-yard run (Mason Crosby kick), 3:58. Packers 21–3. **Drive: 7 plays, 47 yards, 3:31.**

**Third quarter**

- CAR – Teddy Bridgewater 13-yard run (Joey Slye kick), 5:15. Packers 21–10. **Drive: 7 plays, 51 yards, 3:53.**

**Fourth quarter**

- CAR – Joey Slye 22-yard field goal, 8:39. Packers 21–13. **Drive: 16 plays, 76 yards, 8:44.**
- GB – Mason Crosby 51-yard field goal, 3:39. Packers 24–13. **Drive: 10 plays, 42 yards, 5:00.**
- CAR – Joey Slye 33-yard field goal, 2:04. Packers 24–16. **Drive: 6 plays, 61 yards, 1:35.**

**Top passers**

- CAR – Teddy Bridgewater – 21/35, 258 yards
- GB – Aaron Rodgers – 20/29, 143 yards, TD

**Top rushers**

- CAR – Mike Davis – 14 rushes, 59 yards
- GB – Aaron Jones – 20 rushes, 145 yards, TD

**Top receivers**

- CAR – D. J. Moore – 6 receptions, 131 yards
- GB – Allen Lazard – 5 receptions, 56 yards

==== Week 16: vs. Tennessee Titans ====
Week 16: Tennessee Titans at Green Bay Packers – Game summary

Quarter	1	2	3	4	Total
Titans	0	7	7	0	**14**
**Packers**	6	13	14	7	**40**

at Lambeau Field, Green Bay, Wisconsin

- Date: December 27
- Game time: 7:20 p.m. CST
- Game weather: Snow, 28 °F (−2 °C)
- Game attendance: 0
- Referee: Brad Allen
- TV announcers (NBC): Al Michaels, Cris Collinsworth, Michele Tafoya and Terry McAulay
- Recap, Game Book

Game information

**First quarter**

- GB – Davante Adams 5-yard pass from Aaron Rodgers (Mason Crosby kick missed), 9:55. Packers 6–0. **Drive: 8 plays, 60 yards, 5:05.**

**Second quarter**

- GB – Equanimeous St. Brown 21-yard pass from Aaron Rodgers (Aaron Jones run fails), 14:54. Packers 12–0. **Drive: 10 plays, 80 yards, 5:56.**
- GB – Davante Adams 7-yard pass from Aaron Rodgers (Mason Crosby kick), 10:46. Packers 19–0. **Drive: 6 plays, 34 yards, 2:44.**
- TEN – Jonnu Smith 12-yard pass from Ryan Tannehill (Stephen Gostkowski kick), 0:37. Packers 19–7. **Drive: 10 plays, 71 yards, 3:39.**

**Third quarter**

- TEN – Ryan Tannehill 45-yard run (Stephen Gostkowski kick), 12:01. Packers 19–14. **Drive: 5 plays, 66 yards, 2:59.**
- GB – Davante Adams 8-yard pass from Aaron Rodgers (Mason Crosby kick), 10:27. Packers 26–14. **Drive: 3 plays, 66 yards, 1:34.**
- GB – A. J. Dillon 30-yard run (Mason Crosby kick), 3:35. Packers 33–14. **Drive: 9 plays, 74 yards, 5:48.**

**Fourth quarter**

- GB – A. J. Dillon 7-yard run (Mason Crosby kick), 2:25. Packers 40–14. **Drive: 9 plays, 91 yards, 6:03.**

**Top passers**

- TEN – Ryan Tannehill – 11/24, 121 yards, TD, 2 INT
- GB – Aaron Rodgers – 21/25, 231 yards, 4 TD, INT

**Top rushers**

- TEN – Derrick Henry – 23 rushes, 98 yards
- GB – A. J. Dillon – 21 rushes, 124 yards, 2 TD

**Top receivers**

- TEN – A. J. Brown – 4 receptions, 43 yards
- GB – Davante Adams – 11 receptions, 142 yards, 3 TD

==== Week 17: at Chicago Bears ====
Week 17: Green Bay Packers at Chicago Bears – Game summary

Quarter	1	2	3	4	Total
**Packers**	0	21	0	14	**35**
Bears	7	6	3	0	**16**

at Soldier Field, Chicago, Illinois

- Date: January 3
- Game time: 3:25 p.m. CST
- Game weather: Cloudy, 32 °F (0 °C)
- Game attendance: 0
- Referee: Craig Wrolstad
- TV announcers (Fox): Kevin Burkhardt, Daryl Johnston and Pam Oliver
- Recap, Game Book

Game information

**First quarter**

- CHI – David Montgomery 2-yard run (Cairo Santos kick), 7:31. Bears 7–0. **Drive: 14 plays, 60 plays, 7:29.**

**Second quarter**

- GB – Robert Tonyan 3-yard pass from Aaron Rodgers (Mason Crosby kick), 14:55. Tied 7–7. **Drive: 12 plays, 80 yards, 7:36.**
- CHI – Cairo Santos 30-yard field goal, 10:08. Bears 10–7. **Drive: 4 plays, 8 yards, 2:12.**
- GB – Marquez Valdes-Scantling 72-yard pass from Aaron Rodgers (Mason Crosby kick), 8:31. Packers 14–10. **Bears: 3 plays, 78 yards, 1:37.**
- GB – Dominique Dafney 13-yard pass from Aaron Rodgers (Mason Crosby kick), 3:57. Packers 21–10. **Drive: 6 plays, 22 yards, 3:39.**
- CHI – Cairo Santos 27-yard field goal, 0:03. Packers 21–13. **Drive: 13 plays, 62 yards, 3:54.**

**Third quarter**

- CHI – Cairo Santos 20-yard field goal, 5:30. Packers 21–16. **Drive: 11 plays, 87 yards, 6:50.**

**Fourth quarter**

- GB – Aaron Jones 4-yard run (Mason Crosby kick), 3:47. Packers 28–16. **Drive: 12 plays, 76 yards, 7:35.**
- GB – Davante Adams 6-yard pass from Aaron Rodgers (Mason Crosby kick), 2:56. Packers 35–16. **Drive: 3 plays, 26 yards, 0:17.**

**Top passers**

- GB – Aaron Rodgers – 19/24, 240 yards, 4 TD
- CHI – Mitchell Trubisky – 33/42, 252 yards, INT

**Top rushers**

- GB – Aaron Jones – 11 rushes, 42 yards, TD
- CHI – David Montgomery – 22 rushes, 69 yards

**Top receivers**

- GB – Davante Adams – 6 receptions, 46 yards, TD
- CHI – Darnell Mooney – 11 receptions, 93 yards

=== Standings ===
==== Division ====
NFC North
	W	L	T	PCT	DIV	CONF	PF	PA	STK
^{(1)} Green Bay Packers	13	3	0	.813	5–1	10–2	509	369	W6
^{(7)} Chicago Bears	8	8	0	.500	2–4	6–6	372	370	L1
Minnesota Vikings	7	9	0	.438	4–2	5–7	430	475	W1
Detroit Lions	5	11	0	.313	1–5	4–8	377	519	L4

==== Conference ====
NFC
#	Team	Division	W	L	T	PCT	DIV	CONF	SOS	SOV	STK
**Division leaders**
1	Green Bay Packers	North	13	3	0	.813	5–1	10–2	.428	.387	W6
2 (Note: New Orleans finished ahead of Seattle based on conference record.)	New Orleans Saints	South	12	4	0	.750	6–0	10–2	.459	.406	W2
3	Seattle Seahawks	West	12	4	0	.750	4–2	9–3	.447	.404	W4
4	Washington Football Team	East	7	9	0	.438	4–2	5–7	.459	.388	W1
**Wild cards**
5	Tampa Bay Buccaneers	South	11	5	0	.688	4–2	8–4	.488	.392	W4
6	Los Angeles Rams	West	10	6	0	.625	3–3	9–3	.494	.484	W1
7 (Note: Chicago finished and clinched the 7th and final playoff spot ahead of Arizona based on better win percentage in common games (against Detroit, the NY Giants, Carolina, and the LA Rams, Chicago finished 3–2, while Arizona finished 1–4).)	Chicago Bears	North	8	8	0	.500	2–4	6–6	.488	.336	L1
**Did not qualify for the postseason**
8	Arizona Cardinals	West	8	8	0	.500	2–4	6–6	.475	.441	L2
9	Minnesota Vikings	North	7	9	0	.438	4–2	5–7	.504	.366	W1
10 (Note: San Francisco finished ahead of the NY Giants based on head-to-head victory. Division tie break was initially used to eliminate Dallas (see below).)	San Francisco 49ers	West	6	10	0	.375	3–3	4–8	.549	.448	L1
11 (Note: NY Giants won tiebreaker over Dallas based on division record.)	New York Giants	East	6	10	0	.375	4–2	5–7	.502	.427	W1
12	Dallas Cowboys	East	6	10	0	.375	2–4	5–7	.471	.333	L1
13 (Note: Carolina finished ahead of Detroit based on head-to-head victory.)	Carolina Panthers	South	5	11	0	.313	1–5	4–8	.531	.388	L1
14	Detroit Lions	North	5	11	0	.313	1–5	4–8	.508	.350	L4
15	Philadelphia Eagles	East	4	11	1	.281	2–4	4–8	.537	.469	L3
16	Atlanta Falcons	South	4	12	0	.250	1–5	2–10	.551	.391	L5
**Tiebreakers** (Note: When breaking ties for three or more teams under the NFL's rules, they are first broken within divisions, then comparing only the highest-ranked remaining team from each division.)

== Postseason ==
=== Schedule ===
Round	Date	Opponent (seed)	Result	Record	Venue	Recap
Wild Card	First-round bye					
Divisional	January 16, 2021	Los Angeles Rams (6)	W 32–18	1–0	Lambeau Field	Recap
NFC Championship	January 24, 2021	Tampa Bay Buccaneers (5)	L 26–31	1–1	Lambeau Field	Recap

=== Game summaries ===
==== NFC Divisional Playoffs: vs. (6) Los Angeles Rams ====
NFC Divisional Playoffs: (6) Los Angeles Rams at (1) Green Bay Packers – Game summary

Quarter	1	2	3	4	Total
Rams	3	7	8	0	18
Packers	3	16	6	7	32

at Lambeau Field, Green Bay, Wisconsin

- Date: January 16
- Game time: 3:35 p.m. CST
- Game weather: Cloudy, 35 °F (2 °C)
- Game attendance: 7,439
- Referee: Ronald Torbert
- TV announcers (Fox): Kevin Burkhardt, Daryl Johnston, Pam Oliver and Kristina Pink
- Recap, Game Book

Game information

First quarter

- GB – Mason Crosby 24-yard field goal, 8:39. Packers 3–0. Drive: 12 plays, 63 yards, 4:46.
- LAR – Matt Gay 37-yard field goal, 4:36. Tied 3–3. Drive: 8 plays, 62 yards, 4:03.

Second quarter

- GB – Davante Adams 1-yard pass from Aaron Rodgers (Mason Crosby kick), 11:37. Packers 10–3. Drive: 14 plays, 84 yards, 7:59.
- GB – Aaron Rodgers 1-yard run (extra point failed), 3:29. Packers 16–3. Drive: 9 plays, 47 yards, 5:46.
- LAR – Van Jefferson 4-yard pass from Jared Goff (Matt Gay kick), 0:29. Packers 16–10. Drive: 9 plays, 75 yards, 3:00.
- GB – Mason Crosby 39-yard field goal, 0:00. Packers 19–10. Drive: 5 plays, 54 yards, 0:29.

Third quarter

- GB – Aaron Jones 1-yard run (Aaron Jones pass from Aaron Rodgers failed), 12:10. Packers 25–10. Drive: 6 plays, 75 yards, 2:50.
- LAR – Cam Akers 7-yard run (Cam Akers pass from Jared Goff), 1:41. Packers 25–18. Drive: 11 plays, 79 yards, 5:45.

Fourth quarter

- GB – Allen Lazard 58-yard pass from Aaron Rodgers (Mason Crosby kick), 6:52. Packers 32–18. Drive: 5 plays, 73 yards, 2:54.

Top passers

- LAR – Jared Goff – 21/27, 174 yards, TD
- GB – Aaron Rodgers – 23/36, 296 yards, 2 TD

Top rushers

- LAR – Cam Akers – 18 rushes, 90 yards, TD
- GB – Aaron Jones – 14 rushes, 99 yards, TD

Top receivers

- LAR – Josh Reynolds – 3 receptions, 65 yards
- GB – Allen Lazard – 4 receptions, 96 yards, TD

==== NFC Championship: vs. (5) Tampa Bay Buccaneers ====
NFC Championship: (5) Tampa Bay Buccaneers at (1) Green Bay Packers – Game summary

Quarter	1	2	3	4	Total
Buccaneers	7	14	7	3	31
Packers	0	10	13	3	26

at Lambeau Field, Green Bay, Wisconsin

- Date: January 24
- Game time: 2:05 p.m. CST
- Game weather: Sunny, 29 °F (−2 °C)
- Game attendance: 7,772
- Referee: Clete Blakeman
- TV announcers (Fox): Joe Buck, Troy Aikman, Erin Andrews and Tom Rinaldi
- Recap, Game Book

Game information

First quarter

- TB – Mike Evans 15-yard pass from Tom Brady (Ryan Succop kick), 10:59. Buccaneers 7–0. Drive: 9 plays, 66 yards, 4:01.

Second quarter

- GB – Marquez Valdes-Scantling 50-yard pass from Aaron Rodgers (Mason Crosby kick), 14:07. Tied 7–7. Drive: 7 plays, 90 yards, 3:42.
- TB – Leonard Fournette 20-yard run (Ryan Succop kick), 3:24. Buccaneers 14–7. Drive: 4 plays, 73 yards, 1:43.
- GB – Mason Crosby 24-yard field goal, 4:59. Buccaneers 14–10. Drive: 15 plays, 69 yards, 7:25.
- TB – Scotty Miller 39-yard pass from Tom Brady (Ryan Succop kick), 0:01. Buccaneers 21–10. Drive: 5 plays, 51 yards, 0:27.

Third quarter

- TB – Cameron Brate 8-yard pass from Tom Brady (Ryan Succop kick), 13:54. Buccaneers 28–10. Drive: 1 plays, 8 yards, 0:04.
- GB – Robert Tonyan 8-yard pass from Aaron Rodgers (Mason Crosby kick), 9:28. Buccaneers 28–17. Drive: 8 plays, 75 yards, 4:26.
- GB – Davante Adams 2-yard pass from Aaron Rodgers (Equanimeous St. Brown pass from Aaron Rodgers failed), 0:24. Buccaneers 28–23. Drive: 13 plays, 60 yards, 7:30.

Fourth quarter

- TB – Ryan Succop 46-yard field goal, 4:42. Buccaneers 31–23. Drive: 8 plays, 44 yards, 3:28.
- GB – Mason Crosby 26-yard field goal, 2:05. Buccaneers 31–26. Drive: 9 plays, 58 yards, 2:37.

Top passers

- TB – Tom Brady – 20/36, 280 yards, 3 TDs, 3 INTs
- GB – Aaron Rodgers – 33/48, 346 yards, 3 TDs, INT

Top rushers

- TB – Leonard Fournette – 12 rushes, 55 yards, TD
- GB – Aaron Jones – 6 rushes, 27 yards

Top receivers

- TB – Chris Godwin – 5 receptions, 110 yards
- GB – Marquez Valdes-Scantling – 4 receptions, 115 yards, TD

== Statistics ==
=== Starters ===
==== Regular season ====
Offense

Pos.	Name	GS
QB	Aaron Rodgers	16
RB	Aaron Jones	14
RB2	Jamaal Williams	3
WR	Davante Adams; Marquez Valdes-Scantling	14; 12
WR2	Allen Lazard; Malik Taylor; Equanimeous St. Brown	9; 1; 1
TE	Marcedes Lewis	15
TE2	Robert Tonyan; Josiah Deguara; Dominique Dafney	8; 1; 2
LT	David Bakhtiari; Billy Turner; Rick Wagner	12; 2; 2
LG	Elgton Jenkins; Lucas Patrick	12; 4
C	Corey Linsley; Elgton Jenkins	13; 3
RG	Lucas Patrick; Lane Taylor; Billy Turner	11; 1; 4
RT	Billy Turner; Elgton Jenkins; Rick Wagner	7; 1; 8

Defense

Pos.	Name	GS
NT	Tyler Lancaster; Kenny Clark	6; 10
DE	Kingsley Keke; Rashan Gary	9; 1
DE	Dean Lowry	15
OLB	Za'Darius Smith	16
OLB	Preston Smith; Rashan Gary	13; 3
ILB	Christian Kirksey; Ty Summers; Kamal Martin	11; 1; 6
ILB	Krys Barnes	10
CB	Jaire Alexander; Ka'dar Hollman	15; 1
CB	Kevin King; Josh Jackson	11; 5
CB3	Chandon Sullivan	10
S	Adrian Amos	16
S	Darnell Savage; Will Redmond	15; 1

==== Playoffs ====
Offense

Pos.	Name	GS
QB	Aaron Rodgers	2
RB	Aaron Jones	2
RB2	Jamaal Williams	1
WR	Davante Adams	2
WR2	Allen Lazard	1
TE	Marcedes Lewis	2
TE2	Marquez Valdes-Scantling	2
LT	Billy Turner	2
LG	Elgton Jenkins	2
C	Corey Linsley	2
RG	Lucas Patrick	2
RT	Rick Wagner	2

Defense

Pos.	Name	GS
NT	Kenny Clark	2
DE	Tyler Lancaster	1
DE	Dean Lowry	2
OLB	Za'Darius Smith	2
OLB	Preston Smith	2
ILB	Krys Barnes	2
ILB	Christian Kirksey	1
CB	Jaire Alexander	2
CB	Kevin King	2
CB3	Chandon Sullivan	2
S	Adrian Amos	2
S	Darnell Savage	2

=== Team leaders ===
Category	Player(s)	Value
Passing yards	Aaron Rodgers	4299
Passing touchdowns	Aaron Rodgers	48
Rushing yards	Aaron Jones	1104
Rushing touchdowns	Aaron Jones	9
Receptions	Davante Adams	115
Receiving yards	Davante Adams	1374
Receiving touchdowns	Davante Adams	18
Kickoff return yards	Darrius Shepherd	227
Punt return yards	Tyler Ervin	20
Tackles	Adrian Amos	83
Sacks	Za'Darius Smith	12.5
Interceptions	Darnell Savage	4

=== League rankings ===
Category	Total yards	Yards per game	NFL rank (out of 32)
Passing offense	4,106	256.6	9th
Rushing offense	2,118	132.4	8th
Total offense	6,224	389.0	5th
Passing defense	3,539	221.2	7th
Rushing defense	1,805	112.8	13th
Total defense	5,344	334.0	9th

Statistical values are correct as of Week 17

== Awards ==
Recipient	Award(s)
Davante Adams	Pro Bowler; All-Pro Team
Jaire Alexander	Pro Bowler; All-Pro Second Team
David Bakhtiari	Pro Bowler; All-Pro Team
A. J. Dillon	Week 16: Pepsi Zero Sugar Rookie of the Week
Elgton Jenkins	Pro Bowler
Aaron Jones	Week 2: FedEx Ground Player of the Week; Week 13: FedEx Ground Player of the Week; Pro Bowler
Corey Linsley	All-Pro Team
Aaron Rodgers	Week 13: NFC Offensive Player of the Week; Pro Bowler; December/January: NFC Offensive Player of the Month; All-Pro Team; AP Most Valuable Player; FedEx Air Player of the Year
Za'Darius Smith	Week 4: NFC Defensive Player of the Week; Pro Bowler; All-Pro Second Team
