= Henry Black (American football) =

American football player (born 1997)

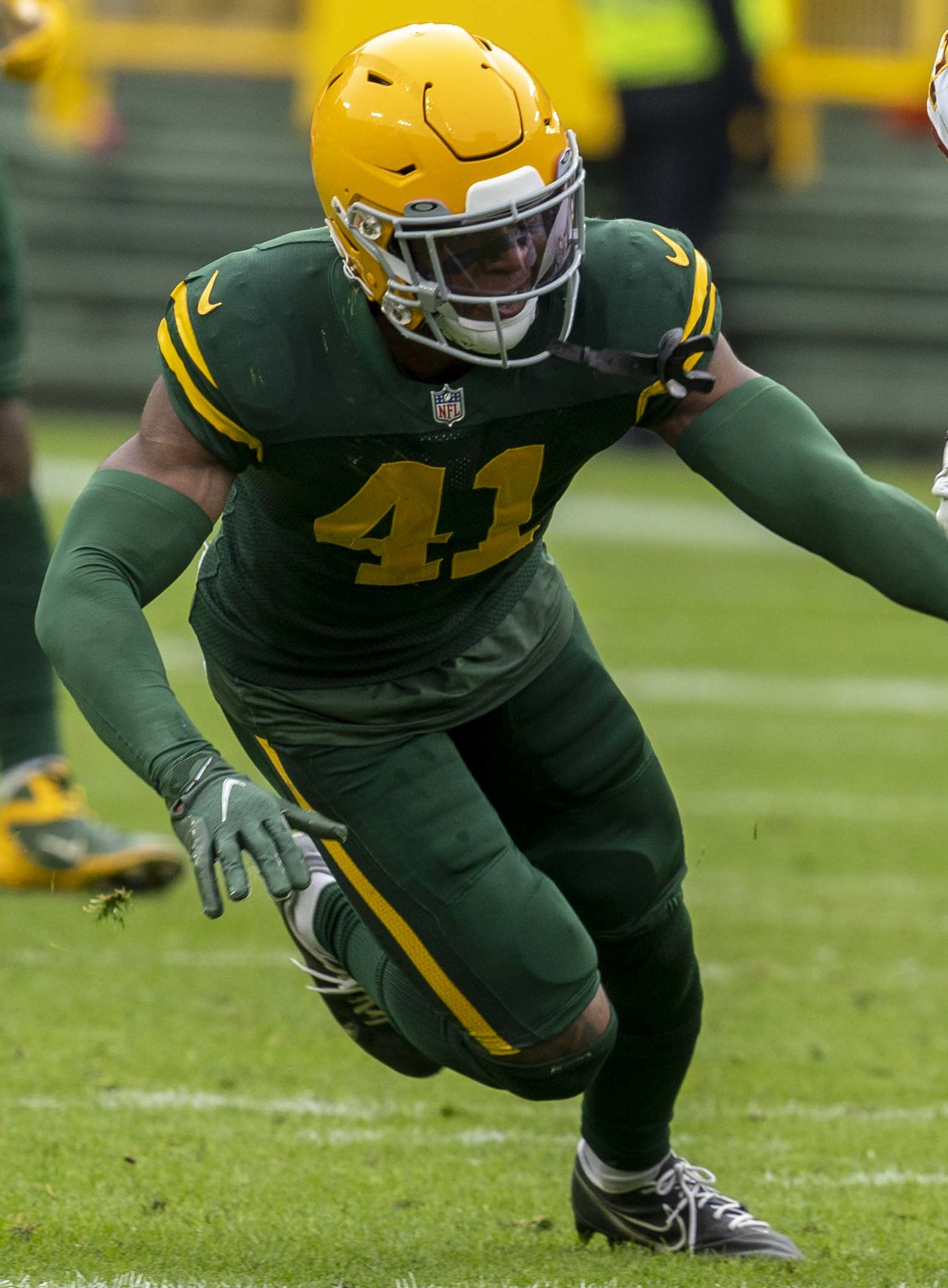
- Black with the Green Bay Packers in 2021

Profile
- Position: Safety

Personal information
- Born: January 3, 1997 (age 29); Shreveport, Louisiana, U.S.
- Listed height: 6 ft 0 in (1.83 m)
- Listed weight: 205 lb (93 kg)

Career information
- High school: Woodlawn (Shreveport, Louisiana)
- College: Baylor (2015–2019)
- NFL draft: 2020: undrafted

Career history
- Green Bay Packers (2020–2021); New York Giants (2022)*; Atlanta Falcons (2022)*; Indianapolis Colts (2022–2023)*; Pittsburgh Steelers (2023)*; Indianapolis Colts (2023); San Antonio Brahmas (2025); Atlanta Falcons (2025)*; Columbus Aviators (2026)
- * Offseason or practice squad member only

Career NFL statistics
- Total tackles: 46
- Pass deflections: 2
- Interceptions: 1
- Forced fumbles: 2
- Fumble recoveries: 1
- Stats at Pro Football Reference

Henry L. Black (born January 3, 1997) is an American professional football safety. He played college football for the Baylor Bears.

== College career ==
Black was a member of the Baylor Bears for five seasons, redshirting as a true freshman. He finished his collegiate career with 119 tackles, four tackles for a loss, two sacks, and two forced fumbles with eight passes defended and two interceptions.

== Professional career ==
Pre-draft measurables
Height	Weight
5 ft 11 3/4 in (1.82 m)	206 lb (93 kg)
Values from Pro Day

=== Green Bay Packers ===
Black was signed by the Green Bay Packers as an undrafted free agent following the 2020 NFL draft on April 29, 2020. He was waived during final roster cuts, but signed to the team's practice squad the following day. He was elevated to the active roster on October 24 for the team's week 7 game against the Houston Texans and made his NFL debut the next day. Black forced a game-ending fumble that was recovered by the Packers in the 35–20 victory. He was returned to the practice squad following the game without having to clear waivers. He was elevated again on October 31, November 5, and November 14 for the weeks 8, 9, and 10 games against the Minnesota Vikings, San Francisco 49ers, and Jacksonville Jaguars, and reverted to the practice squad again after each game. On December 8, Black was signed to the active roster.

Black was named the fourth safety on the depth chart to begin the regular season. 2020 seventh-round pick Vernon Scott missed much of the season with injuries, and as a result, Black saw regular action as the Packers' dime safety. He recorded his first NFL interception on October 28, 2021, during a Week 8 win against the Arizona Cardinals, off a pass thrown by Kyler Murray. The Packers did not pick up Black's exclusive rights free agent (ERFA) tender, which would have given him a 1-year, $645,000 contract to stay with the team, making him a free agent for the 2022 season.

=== New York Giants ===
On May 18, 2022, Black signed with the New York Giants. On July 26, Black was waived by the Giants.

=== Atlanta Falcons ===
On July 28, 2022, the Atlanta Falcons signed Black. He was waived on August 30.

=== Indianapolis Colts (first stint) ===
On September 13, 2022, Black was signed to the Indianapolis Colts practice squad. He signed a reserve/future contract on January 9, 2023.

On August 29, 2023, Black was waived by the Colts and re-signed to the practice squad. He was released on October 24.

=== Pittsburgh Steelers ===
On November 21, 2023, Black was signed to the Pittsburgh Steelers' practice squad.

=== Indianapolis Colts (second stint) ===
On December 26, 2023, the Indianapolis Colts signed Black off of the Steelers' practice squad.

=== San Antonio Brahmas ===
On October 8, 2024, Black was signed by the San Antonio Brahmas of the United Football League (UFL).

=== Atlanta Falcons (second stint) ===
On July 31, 2025, Black signed with the Atlanta Falcons. He was waived on August 26 as part of final roster cuts.

=== Columbus Aviators ===
On January 13, 2026, Black was selected by the Columbus Aviators in the 2026 UFL Draft.

== NFL career statistics ==
=== Regular season ===
Year	Team	GP	GS	Tackles					Interceptions						Fumbles	
Year	Team	GP	GS	Total	Solo	Ast	Sck	SFTY	PDef	Int	Yds	Avg	Lng	TDs	FF	FR
2020	GB	8	0	8	6	2	0.0	0	0	0	0	0.0	0	0	1	0
2021	GB	17	0	36	28	10	0.0	0	2	1	0	0.0	0	0	1	0
Total		25	0	46	34	12	0.0	0	2	1	0	0.0	0	0	2	0
Source: pro-football-reference.com

=== Postseason ===
Year	Team	GP	GS	Tackles					Interceptions						Fumbles	
Year	Team	GP	GS	Total	Solo	Ast	Sck	SFTY	PDef	Int	Yds	Avg	Lng	TDs	FF	FR
2020	GB	2	0	4	2	2	0.0	0	0	0	0	0.0	0	0	0	0
2021	GB	1	0	2	1	1	0.0	0	0	0	0	0.0	0	0	0	0
Total		3	0	6	3	3	0.0	0	0	0	0	0.0	0	0	0	0
Source: pro-football-reference.com
