= Dominique Dafney =

American football player (born 1997)

Profile
- Position: Tight end

Personal information
- Born: June 3, 1997 (age 29); Charlotte, North Carolina, U.S.
- Listed height: 6 ft 2 in (1.88 m)
- Listed weight: 243 lb (110 kg)

Career information
- High school: Valley (West Des Moines, Iowa)
- College: Iowa Western (2016); Iowa (2017–2018); Indiana State (2019)
- NFL draft: 2020: undrafted

Career history
- Indianapolis Colts (2020)*; Green Bay Packers (2020–2021); Denver Broncos (2022)*; Indianapolis Colts (2022)*; Tampa Bay Buccaneers (2023)*; Memphis Showboats (2024)*; Carolina Panthers (2025)*
- * Offseason or practice squad member only

Career NFL statistics as of 2024
- Receptions: 4
- Receiving yards: 60
- Receiving touchdowns: 1
- Stats at Pro Football Reference

Dominique Dafney (born June 3, 1997) is an American professional football tight end. He played college football for the Iowa Hawkeyes and Indiana State Sycamores, and signed with the Indianapolis Colts as an undrafted free agent in 2020. He has also played for the Green Bay Packers.

== College career ==
Dafney began his career at Iowa Western Community College, spending one season as a reserve wide receiver before transferring to the University of Iowa as a preferred walk-on. Dafney played two seasons, mostly on special teams, with the Hawkeyes. He transferred to Indiana State University after his junior year as a graduate transfer. In his only season with the Sycamores, Dafney rushed for 439 yards and six touchdowns and caught 15 passes for 196 yards and one touchdown, earning second-team All-Missouri Valley Football Conference honors at fullback. During the final four games of his senior year, he began snapping the ball from the wildcat position.

== Professional career ==
Pre-draft measurables
Height	Weight
6 ft 2 1/8 in (1.88 m)	235 lb (107 kg)
Values from Pro Day

=== Indianapolis Colts (first stint) ===
Dafney was signed by the Indianapolis Colts as an undrafted free agent August 26, 2020. He was waived by the Colts on September 8, 2020, during final roster cuts.

=== Green Bay Packers ===
The Green Bay Packers signed Dafney to their practice squad on October 12, 2020. He was elevated to the active roster on December 5 for the team's week 13 game against the Philadelphia Eagles, and reverted to the practice squad after the game. He was promoted to the active roster on December 12. On December 27, he recorded his first NFL catch, a 13-yard reception from Aaron Rodgers, during a Week 16 victory over the Tennessee Titans. On January 3, 2021, Dafney caught his first NFL touchdown during a Week 17 win against the Chicago Bears.

On September 25, 2021, Dafney was placed on injured reserve. He was reactivated on October 28, 2021. He signed his tender offer from the Packers on April 18, 2022, to keep him with the team. He was waived/injured on August 16, 2022, and placed on injured reserve. The Packers reached an injury settlement with Dafney on August 22, 2022, making him a free agent.

=== Denver Broncos ===
On September 13, 2022, Dafney was signed to the Denver Broncos practice squad. He was released on October 10, 2022.

=== Indianapolis Colts (second stint) ===
On December 20, 2022, Dafney was signed to the Indianapolis Colts practice squad. He was released on December 29.

=== Tampa Bay Buccaneers ===
On January 23, 2023, Dafney signed a reserve/future contract with the Tampa Bay Buccaneers. He was waived on August 28.

=== Memphis Showboats ===
On February 21, 2024, Dafney signed with the Memphis Showboats of the United Football League (UFL). He was waived on March 23.

=== Carolina Panthers ===
On December 3, 2024, Dafney signed with the Carolina Panthers practice squad. He signed a reserve/future contract with Carolina on January 6, 2025. On August 25, Dafney was waived by the Panthers.

== NFL career statistics ==
=== Regular season ===
Year	Team	Games		Receiving					Fumbles	
Year	Team	G	GS	Rec	Yds	Avg	Lng	TD	FUM	Lost
2020	GB	5	2	2	26	13.0	13	1	0	0
2021	GB	10	2	2	34	17.0	26	0	0	0
Total		15	4	4	60	15.0	26	1	0	0
Source: NFL.com
