= Stanford Samuels III =

American football player (born 1999)

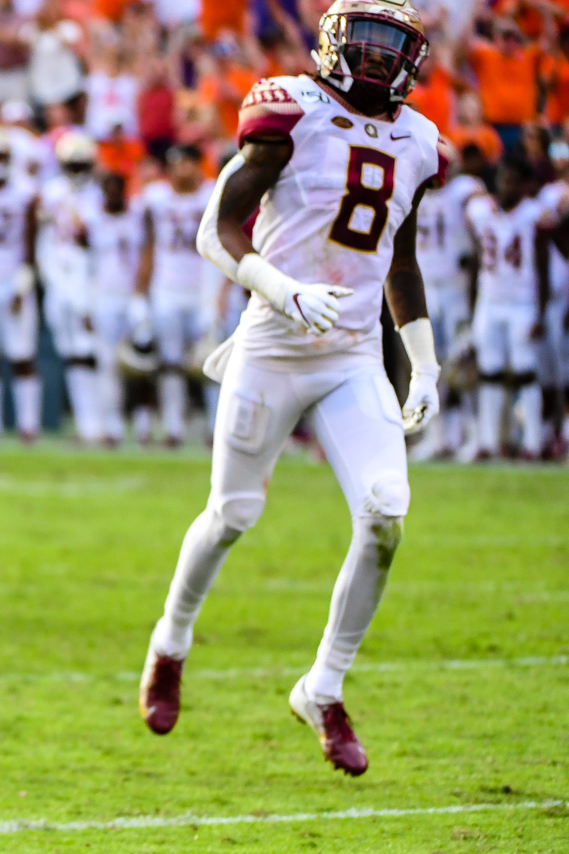
- Samuels at Florida State in 2019

No. 46
- Position: Cornerback

Personal information
- Born: February 23, 1999 (age 27); Pembroke Pines, Florida, U.S.
- Listed height: 6 ft 1 in (1.85 m)
- Listed weight: 187 lb (85 kg)

Career information
- High school: Charles W. Flanagan (Pembroke Pines)
- College: Florida State
- NFL draft: 2020: undrafted

Career history
- Green Bay Packers (2020); Chicago Bears (2021)*; Las Vegas Raiders (2022)*; Philadelphia Stars (2023)
- * Offseason or practice squad member only

Career NFL statistics
- Total tackles: 3
- Stats at Pro Football Reference

Stanford Lapolean Samuels III (born February 23, 1999) is an American former professional football player who was a cornerback in the National Football League (NFL). He played college football for the Florida State Seminoles.

== Early life ==
Samuels grew up in Hollywood, Florida and attended Charles W. Flanagan High School. As a senior, Samuels was named the Broward County Defensive Player of the Year and played in the 2016 Under Armour All-America Game. A consensus top-five cornerback in his recruiting class, Samuels committed to play college football for the Florida State Seminoles, his father's alma mater, over offers from Alabama, Michigan, and Georgia.

== College career ==
Samuels enrolled early at Florida State University to participate in spring practices. Samuels played in all 13 of Florida State's games as a true freshman, registering 27 tackles with a sack five passes defended and two interceptions. He moved to safety and started the final 11 games of his sophomore season, finishing the year with 58 tackles (one for a loss), four interceptions and four pass breakups. As a junior, he moved back to cornerback and started all 12 of the Seminoles' games and made 60 tackles (1.5 for loss), two interceptions and seven passes defended and was named honorable mention All-ACC. Following the end of the season Samuels announced he would forgo his senior year at Florida State in order to enter the 2020 NFL Draft.

== Professional career ==
=== Green Bay Packers ===
Samuels signed with the Green Bay Packers as an undrafted free agent on April 29, 2020, shortly after the conclusion of the 2020 NFL draft. He was waived on September 5, 2020, and was signed to the practice squad the following day. He was elevated to the active roster on November 5 and 14 for the team's weeks 9 and 10 games against the San Francisco 49ers and Jacksonville Jaguars, and reverted to the practice squad after each game. On January 25, 2021, Samuels signed a reserve/futures contract with the Packers. He was released on August 18, 2021.

=== Chicago Bears ===
On January 5, 2022, Samuels was signed to the Chicago Bears practice squad.

=== Las Vegas Raiders ===
On May 16, 2022, Samuels signed with the Las Vegas Raiders. He was released on July 11, 2022.

=== Philadelphia Stars ===
Samuels signed with the Philadelphia Stars of the USFL on November 17, 2022. The Stars folded when the XFL and USFL merged to create the United Football League (UFL).

== NFL career statistics ==
Regular season statistics
Year	Team	Games		Tackles					Interceptions						Fumbles	
Year	Team	GP	GS	Comb	Total	Ast	Sck	Sfty	PD	Int	Yds	Avg	Lng	TDs	FF	FR
2020	GB	2	0	3	3	0	0.0	0	0	0	0	0	0	0	0	0
Career		2	0	3	3	0	0.0	0	0	0	0	0	0	0	0	0
Source: NFL.com

== Personal life ==
Samuels' father, Stanford Samuels Jr., also played football at Florida State and professionally in the Canadian Football League.
