= Stanford Samuels Jr. =

American gridiron football player and coach (born 1980)

Stanford Samuels Jr
Louisville Cardinals Football
- Title: Cornerbacks coach

Personal information
- Born: July 27, 1980 (age 46); Miami, Florida, U.S.
- Listed height: 5 ft 10 in (1.78 m)
- Listed weight: 193 lb (88 kg)

Career information
- High school: Miami (FL) Carol City
- College: Florida State
- NFL draft: 2004: undrafted

Career history

Playing
- Indianapolis Colts (2004)*; Winnipeg Blue Bombers (2005–2006); Edmonton Eskimos (2007); Winnipeg Blue Bombers (2008); Montreal Alouettes (2009–2010)
- * Offseason or practice squad member only

Coaching
- Florida State (2019) Defensive assistant; Florida Atlantic (2020–2022) Cornerbacks coach; Louisville Cardinals (2022–present) Recruiting coordinator

Awards and highlights
- Grey Cup champion (2009); BCS national champion (1999); First-team All-ACC (2003)
- Stats at CFL.ca (archive)

Stanford Samuels Jr (born July 27, 1980) is an American former professional football cornerback and current recruiting coordinator for Louisville Cardinals football. He was originally signed as an undrafted free agent by the Indianapolis Colts in 2004. He played college football for Florida State.

Samuels also played for the Edmonton Eskimos, Winnipeg Blue Bombers, and Montreal Alouettes.

== Professional career ==
=== Indianapolis Colts ===
Samuels went undrafted in the 2004 NFL draft and signed with the Indianapolis Colts. He was cut by the Colts after training camp when they were cutting their roster down to the NFL mandated 53-man roster.

=== First stint with Blue Bombers ===
Days before the start of the Winnipeg Blue Bombers 2005 training camp he joined the team. Samuels debuted for Winnipeg in week one against the Saskatchewan Roughriders. His starting debut came in week eight against the Hamilton Tiger-Cats. He played in 17 of the 18 games, missing the last game against Calgary due to injury. He finished third on the team in tackles with 62 and then was second on the team with two fumble recoveries.

In 2006, Samuels started 12 games for Winnipeg while missing seven games including a playoff game due to injury. However, he still finished second on the team with five pass knockdowns and three interceptions. He also had 28 tackles and one tackle for a loss. The teams' only blocked punt of the season came when Samuels blocked a punt attempt of the Montreal Alouettes Damon Duval.

=== Edmonton Eskimos ===
Following the 2006 season, Samuels signed as a free agent with the Edmonton Eskimos. With Edmonton he started 14 games and was fourth one team with 51 tackles and four pass knockdowns. He also recorded one tackle for a loss and one interception.

Samuels was released by Edmonton following their 2008 training camp.

=== Second stint with Blue Bombers ===
Samuels re-signed with the Blue Bombers on July 20, 2008. He led Winnipeg in fumble recoveries and finished second on the team in interceptions. He was released on February 6, 2009.

=== Montreal Alouettes ===
Samuels signed with the Montreal Alouettes on February 24, 2009.

On July 20, 2010, Samuels was released by the Alouettes.

== Coaching career ==
Samuels began his coaching career in 2019 at his alma mater as a defensive assistant under Willie Taggart. In 2020 he went with Taggart to Florida Atlantic and became the team’s cornerbacks coach.

== Personal ==
Throughout his CFL career, Samuels has lashed out against management, having called former Blue Bombers general manager Brendan Taman a "snake" and then getting into a heated argument with former Eskimos head coach Danny Maciocia, following the release of Ron Warner. He was born in Miami, Florida and attended Florida State University. While there, he majored in social sciences and was a teammate of Michael Boulware and Darnell Dockett. He also has a son named Stanford Samuels III and another named Semaj Samuels.
