= John Lovett (tight end) =

American football player (born 1996)

No. 45
- Position: Fullback

Personal information
- Born: April 25, 1996 (age 30); Wantagh, New York, U.S.
- Listed height: 6 ft 3 in (1.91 m)
- Listed weight: 225 lb (102 kg)

Career information
- High school: DeMatha Catholic (Hyattsville, Maryland)
- College: Princeton
- NFL draft: 2019: undrafted

Career history
- Kansas City Chiefs (2019–2020); Green Bay Packers (2020); Miami Dolphins (2022–2023)

Awards and highlights
- Super Bowl champion (LIV); 2× Ivy League Offensive Player of the Year (2016, 2018); 2× FCS First-team All-American (2016, 2018); 3× First-team All-Ivy League (2015, 2016, 2018)

Career NFL statistics
- Rushing yards: 6
- Rushing average: 2
- Stats at Pro Football Reference

John Lovett (born April 25, 1996) is an American former professional football player who was a fullback in the National Football League (NFL). He played college football for the Princeton Tigers.

== College career ==
Lovett played quarterback, running back, and wide receiver during his collegiate career at Princeton University. In 2018, Lovett became Princeton's first two-time first-team All-American since Keith Elias after leading Princeton to its first perfect 10–0 season since 1964. That season, Lovett led Princeton to the highest scoring offense in Ivy League history. Lovett finished his college career with 2,509 yards passing, 1,591 yards rushing and 553 yards receiving. He led Princeton to a 23–4 record in games he started between 2015 and 2018, including a 14–1 mark in its last 15 Ivy League games. He finished his Princeton career as the school's top touchdown scorer accounting for 75 career touchdowns (passing, rushing, receiving). He finished second all-time in program history with 41 career rushing touchdowns. As a senior, he compiled 1,833 yards, 18 touchdowns and three interceptions while rushing 141 times for 894 yards and 13 touchdowns. Lovett was a two-time Bushnell Cup winner which is awarded to the Ivy League's top offensive player. In 2016, Lovett led the FCS and broke the Princeton single-season rushing touchdowns record with 20. He accounted for 31 touchdowns that season (20 rushing, 10 passing, 1 receiving), which was more than five Ivy League teams scored all season.

== Professional career ==
Pre-draft measurables
Height	Weight	Arm length	Hand span	40-yard dash	10-yard split	20-yard split	20-yard shuttle	Three-cone drill	Vertical jump	Broad jump
6 ft 2 1/4 in (1.89 m)	234 lb (106 kg)	31 1/4 in (0.79 m)	9 3/4 in (0.25 m)	4.68 s	1.63 s	2.64 s	4.13 s	6.83 s	32.0 in (0.81 m)	10 ft 1 in (3.07 m)
All values from Pro Day

=== Kansas City Chiefs ===
Lovett was signed by the Kansas City Chiefs as an undrafted free agent on May 9, 2019, after participating in a rookie mini-camp. He was moved to the halfback and tight end positions during training camp. The Chiefs placed Lovett on season-ending injured reserve on August 27, 2019. Lovett was waived by the Chiefs on July 29, 2020.

=== Green Bay Packers ===
Lovett was claimed off waivers by the Green Bay Packers on July 30, 2020. He was waived during final roster cuts on September 5, 2020, and was signed to the practice squad the next day. He was elevated to the active roster for the week 1 game against the Minnesota Vikings and for the week 2 game against the Detroit Lions, and then reverted to the team's practice squad following each game. He made his NFL debut on September 13 against the Vikings. He was promoted to the active roster on September 26, 2020. He was placed on injured reserve on November 14, 2020, with a torn ACL. He was waived with a "failed physical" designation on March 12, 2021.

=== Miami Dolphins ===
On February 18, 2022, Lovett signed with the Miami Dolphins. He was placed on injured reserve on August 23, 2022.

On August 4, 2023, Lovett was waived/injured by the Miami Dolphins and placed on injured reserve. He was waived with an injury settlement on August 12, 2023.

== NFL career statistics ==
=== Regular season ===
Year	Team	Games		Receiving					Fumbles	
Year	Team	G	GS	Rec	Yds	Avg	Lng	TD	FUM	Lost
2020	GB	8	0	3	6	2.0	4	0	0	0
Total		8	0	3	6	2.0	4	0	0	0
Source: NFL.com
