= Anthony Rush =

American football player (born 1996)

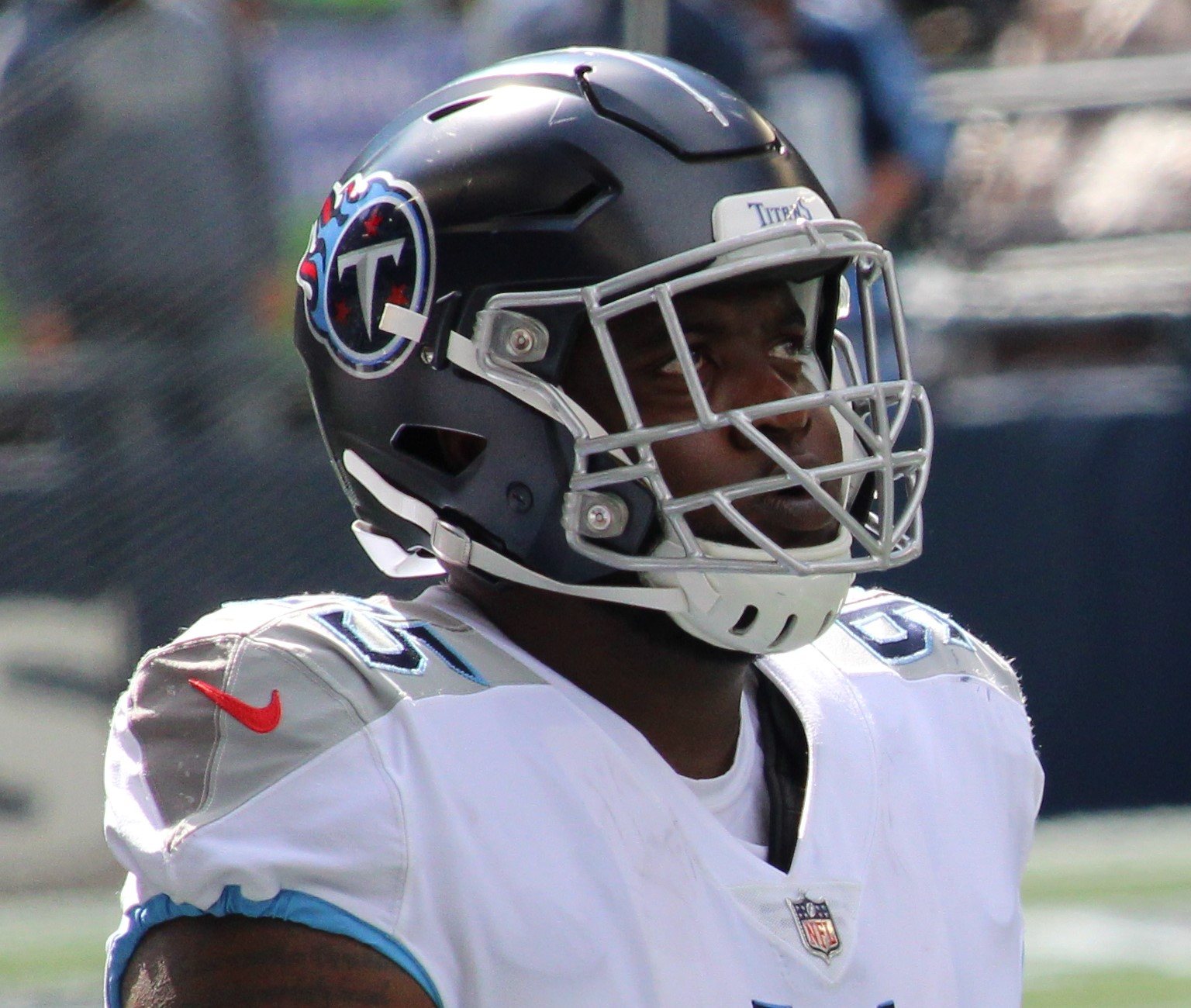
- Rush with the Tennessee Titans in 2021

Profile
- Position: Nose tackle

Personal information
- Born: September 1, 1996 (age 30); Raleigh, North Carolina, U.S.
- Listed height: 6 ft 4 in (1.93 m)
- Listed weight: 361 lb (164 kg)

Career information
- High school: Cary (Cary, North Carolina)
- College: Northeast Mississippi CC (2015–2016); UAB (2017–2018)
- NFL draft: 2019: undrafted

Career history
- Philadelphia Eagles (2019)*; Oakland Raiders (2019)*; Philadelphia Eagles (2019); Seattle Seahawks (2020); Chicago Bears (2020); Green Bay Packers (2020); Tennessee Titans (2021); Atlanta Falcons (2021–2022); Philadelphia Eagles (2022)*; Dallas Cowboys (2022)*
- * Offseason or practice squad member only

Career NFL statistics
- Total tackles: 40
- Sacks: 0.5
- Forced fumbles: 1
- Stats at Pro Football Reference

Anthony Rush (born September 1, 1996) is an American former professional football player who was a nose tackle in the National Football League (NFL). After playing college football for the UAB Blazers, he was signed by the Philadelphia Eagles as an undrafted free agent in 2019. He was also a member of the Oakland Raiders, Seattle Seahawks, Chicago Bears, Green Bay Packers, Tennessee Titans, Atlanta Falcons, and Dallas Cowboys.

== Early life ==
Rush is a native of Raleigh, North Carolina. He attended Cary High School. He played both defense and offense for his high school team, earning first-team All Southwest Wake Athletic Conference honors as a junior.

== College career ==
Because of problems with academics coming out of high school Rush spent his first two years of college at Northeast Mississippi Community College where he recorded 73 tackles and 4 sacks. In his two years at the University of Alabama at Birmingham, Rush recorded 77 tackles (20 for loss), 2 sacks and an interception returned for a touchdown.

== Professional career ==
Pre-draft measurables
Height	Weight	Arm length	Hand span
6 ft 4 1/4 in (1.94 m)	352 lb (160 kg)	33 1/8 in (0.84 m)	9 1/8 in (0.23 m)
All values from Pro Day

=== Philadelphia Eagles ===
Rush signed with the Philadelphia Eagles as an undrafted free agent on April 28, 2019. He was waived on July 27.

=== Oakland Raiders ===
Rush signed with the Oakland Raiders on August 1, 2019. He was waived during final roster cuts on August 31, 2019, but was re-signed to the team's practice squad on September 2.

=== Philadelphia Eagles (second stint) ===
On October 21, 2019, Rush was signed by the Eagles off the Raiders' practice squad. He was waived on September 5, 2020.

=== Seattle Seahawks ===
On September 9, 2020, Rush was signed to the Seattle Seahawks practice squad. He was elevated to the active roster on September 19 for the team's Week 2 game against the New England Patriots, and reverted to the practice squad after the game. He was promoted to the active roster on September 23. He was waived on October 27, 2020.

=== Chicago Bears ===
On November 10, 2020, Rush was signed by the Chicago Bears to the active roster. He was waived by the team on November 24.

=== Green Bay Packers ===
On November 25, 2020, Rush was claimed off waivers by the Green Bay Packers. He was waived by the Packers on December 31, 2020, and re-signed to the practice squad two days later. On January 25, 2021, Rush signed a reserve/futures contract with the Packers. He was waived on June 10, 2021.

=== Tennessee Titans ===
On July 26, 2021, Rush signed with the Tennessee Titans. He was released on September 21, 2021.

=== Atlanta Falcons ===
On September 23, 2021, Rush signed with the practice squad of the Atlanta Falcons. On November 8, 2021, Rush was promoted to the active roster. Rush made his first career NFL start in Week 11 against the New England Patriots.

On March 17, 2022, Rush signed a one-year contract with the Falcons. He started the first four games before getting waived on October 6, 2022.

=== Philadelphia Eagles (third stint) ===
On November 24, 2022, Rush was signed to the Eagles practice squad. He was released on December 6.

=== Dallas Cowboys ===
On December 14, 2022, Rush was signed to the Dallas Cowboys practice squad, after defensive tackle Johnathan Hankins suffered a pectoral injury. On January 30, 2023, he was released.

== NFL career statistics ==
=== Regular season ===
Season	Team	GP	GS	Total	Solo	Ast	Sck	FF	FR	PD
2019	PHI	9	0	9	6	3	0	0	0	2
2020	GB	1	0	0	0	0	0	0	0	0
2020	SEA	4	0	5	1	4	0.5	0	0	0
2021	TEN	2	0	0	0	0	0	0	0	0
2021	ATL	10	6	19	10	9	0	1	0	0
Total		26	6	33	17	16	0.5	1	0	2
Source: NFL.com and PFR.com
