= Ty Summers =

American football player (born 1995)

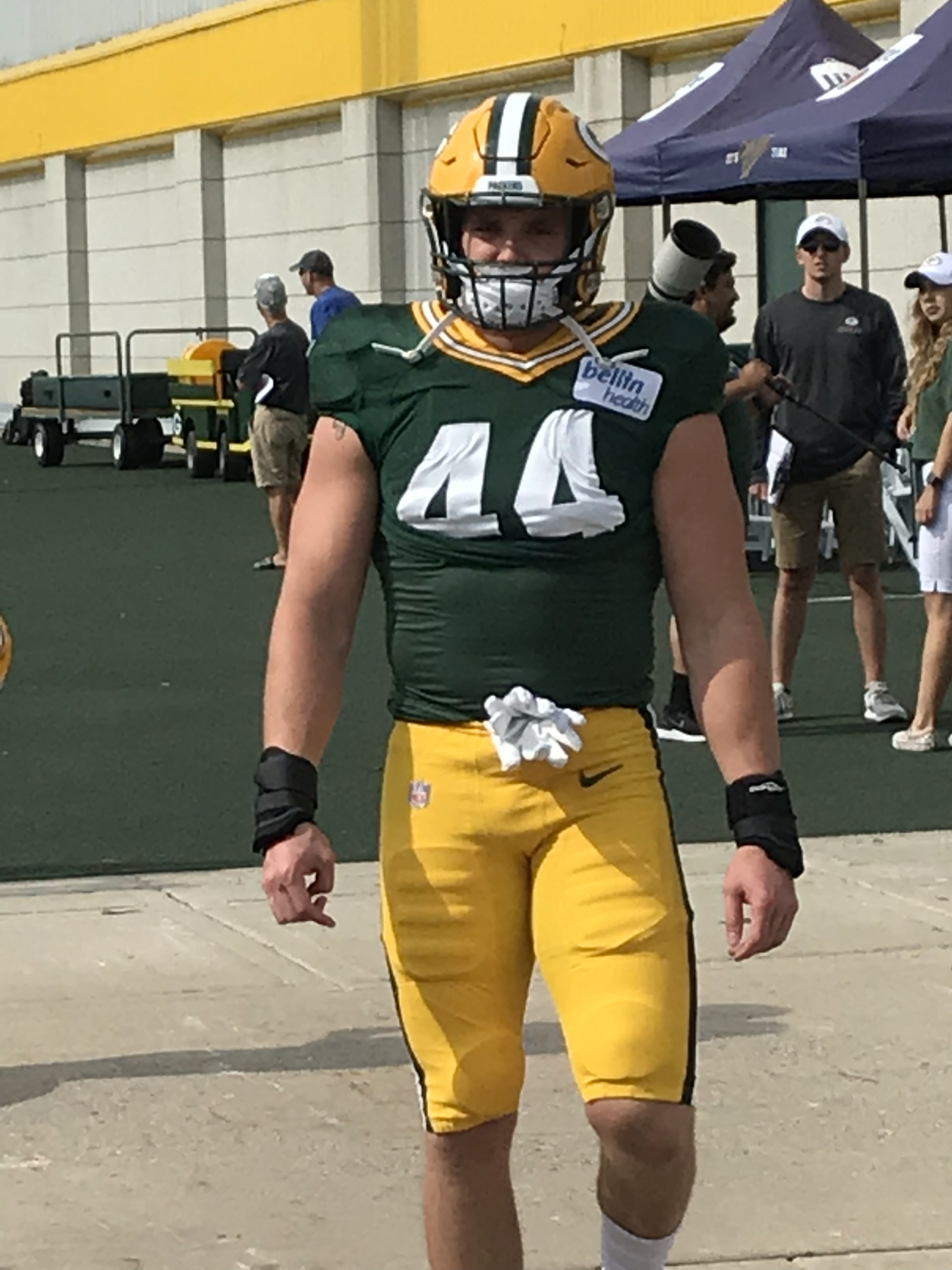
- Summers with the Green Bay Packers in 2019

Profile
- Position: Linebacker

Personal information
- Born: December 31, 1995 (age 30); San Antonio, Texas, U.S.
- Listed height: 6 ft 1 in (1.85 m)
- Listed weight: 241 lb (109 kg)

Career information
- High school: Reagan (San Antonio)
- College: TCU (2014–2018)
- NFL draft: 2019: 7th round, 226th overall pick

Career history
- Green Bay Packers (2019–2022); Jacksonville Jaguars (2022); New Orleans Saints (2022–2023); Jacksonville Jaguars (2024)*; Detroit Lions (2024)*; New York Giants (2024); Detroit Lions (2025); Chicago Bears (2025)
- * Offseason or practice squad member only

Awards and highlights
- Second-team All-Big 12 (2016)

Career NFL statistics as of 2024
- Total tackles: 89
- Pass deflections: 2
- Fumble recoveries: 1
- Stats at Pro Football Reference

Tyler Christian Summers (born December 31, 1995) is an American professional football linebacker. He played college football for the TCU Horned Frogs, and was selected by the Green Bay Packers in the seventh round of the 2019 NFL draft.

== College career ==
Summers played in 51 games for the Horned Frogs starting 32. Summers recorded 317 tackles with 23.5 for a loss and 10 sacks during his college career including a career high 121 during his sophomore campaign. Summers received second-team all-Big 12 Conference honors in 2016 and honorable mention all-Big 12 honors in 2017 and 2018.

== Professional career ==
Pre-draft measurables
Height	Weight	Arm length	Hand span	40-yard dash	10-yard split	20-yard split	20-yard shuttle	Three-cone drill	Vertical jump	Broad jump	Bench press
6 ft 1 3/8 in (1.86 m)	241 lb (109 kg)	31 1/2 in (0.80 m)	10 in (0.25 m)	4.51 s	1.60 s	2.68 s	4.26 s	7.00 s	36.0 in (0.91 m)	10 ft 3 in (3.12 m)	27 reps
All values from NFL Combine/Pro Day

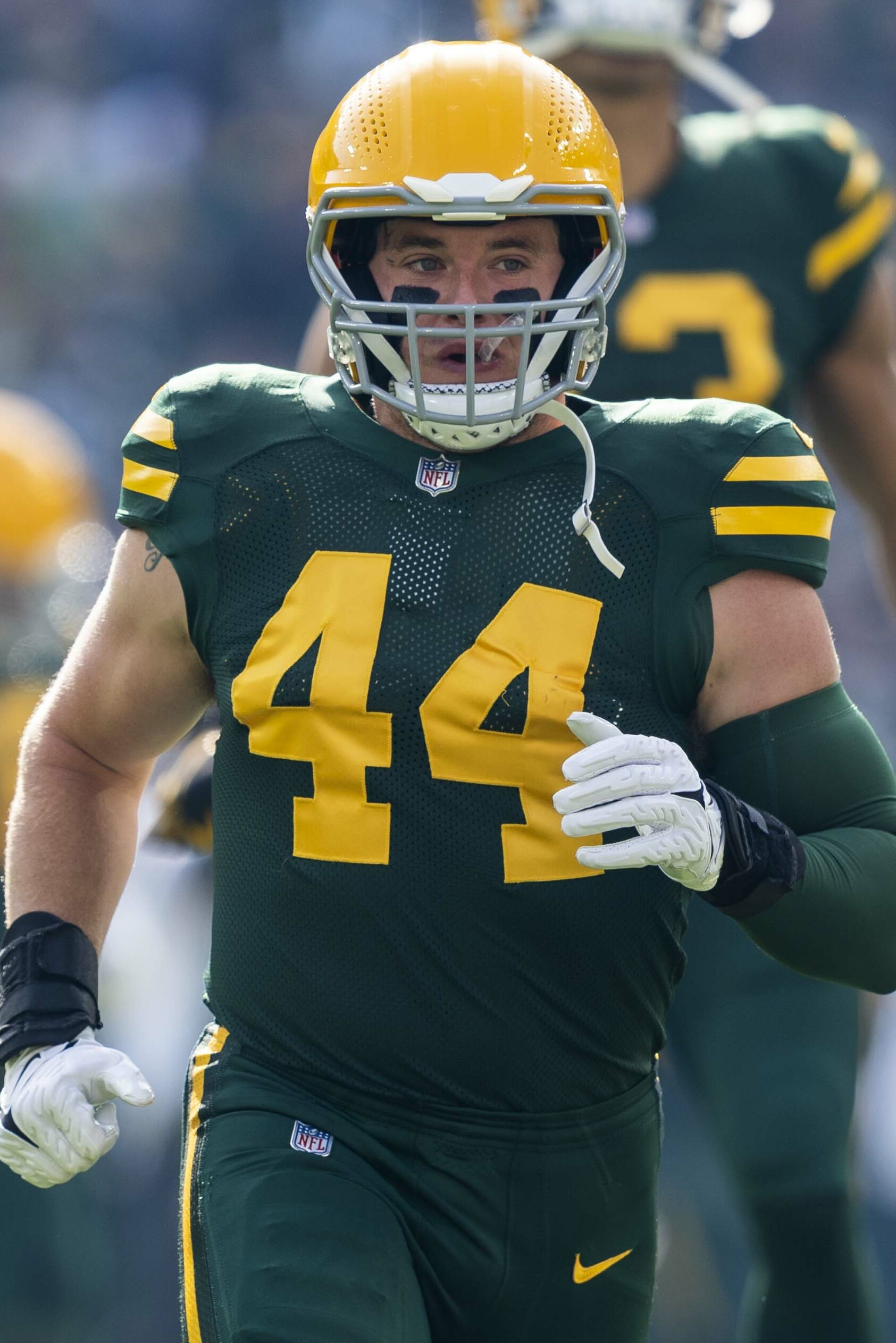
Summers with the Green Bay Packers in 2021

=== Green Bay Packers ===
Summers was selected by the Green Bay Packers in the seventh round of the 2019 NFL draft. On May 3, 2019, he signed his rookie contract with the Packers.

Summers entered the 2021 season as a core special teamer and backup linebacker. He was placed on injured reserve on December 24.

Summers was waived by the Packers on August 28, 2022.

=== Jacksonville Jaguars (first stint) ===
Summers was claimed off waivers by the Jacksonville Jaguars on August 31, 2022. He was waived three days later and re-signed to the practice squad.

=== New Orleans Saints ===
On December 21, 2022, the New Orleans Saints signed Summers off Jacksonville's practice squad. He was waived on August 29, 2023 and re-signed to the practice squad, but released the next day. On September 13, 2023, he was signed to the Saints practice squad. He was promoted to the active roster on September 21.

=== Jacksonville Jaguars (second stint) ===
On May 16, 2024, Summers signed with the Jacksonville Jaguars. He was released on August 11.

=== Detroit Lions ===
On August 12, 2024, Summers signed with the Detroit Lions. He was released on August 27.

=== New York Giants ===
On August 28, 2024, Summers was signed to the New York Giants practice squad. He was promoted to the active roster on September 25.

On March 31, 2025, Summers re-signed with the Giants. He was released on August 6.

=== Detroit Lions (second stint) ===
On September 30, 2025, Summers signed with the Detroit Lions' practice squad. He was promoted to the active roster the following day. Summers was released on October 20 and re-signed to the practice squad the next day. On November 5, he was signed to the active roster. Summers was waived again on November 22.

=== Chicago Bears ===
On December 10, 2025, Summers was signed to the Chicago Bears' practice squad.

== NFL career statistics ==
=== Regular season ===
Year	Team	GP	GS	Tackles					Interceptions						Fumbles	
Year	Team	GP	GS	Total	Solo	Ast	Sck	SFTY	PDef	Int	Yds	Avg	Lng	TDs	FF	FR
2019	GB	16	0	4	2	2	0.0	0	0	0	0	0	0	0	0	0
2020	GB	16	1	37	25	12	0.0	0	1	0	0	0	0	0	0	0
2021	GB	14	0	9	8	1	0.0	0	0	0	0	0	0	0	0	1
2022	JAX	3	0	4	2	2	0.0	0	0	0	0	0	0	0	0	0
2022	NO	3	0	2	2	0	0.0	0	0	0	0	0	0	0	0	0
2023	NO	15	0	2	1	1	0.0	0	0	0	0	0	0	0	0	0
2024	NYG	16	2	29	13	16	0.0	0	1	0	0	0	0	0	0	0
2025	DET	5	0	1	0	1	0.0	0	0	0	0	0	0	0	0	0
2025	CHI	1	0	0	0	0	0.0	0	0	0	0	0	0	0	0	0
Total		89	3	90	55	35	0.0	0	2	0	0	0	0	0	0	1
Source: pro-football-reference.com

=== Postseason ===
Year	Team	GP	GS	Tackles					Interceptions						Fumbles	
Year	Team	GP	GS	Total	Solo	Ast	Sck	SFTY	PDef	Int	Yds	Avg	Lng	TDs	FF	FR
2019	GB	2	0	2	0	2	0.0	0	0	0	0	0	0	0	0	0
2020	GB	2	0	3	3	0	0.0	0	0	0	0	0	0	0	0	0
Total		4	0	5	3	2	0.0	0	0	0	0	0	0	0	0	0
Source: pro-football-reference.com

== Personal life ==
Summers is a Christian. Summers is married to Sidnee Jo Summers. They have two sons and one daughter together.https://instagram.com/sidneejo_summers
