= Vernon Scott =

American football player (born 1997)

Profile
- Position: Safety

Personal information
- Born: September 11, 1997 (age 29); Dallas, Texas, U.S.
- Listed height: 6 ft 2 in (1.88 m)
- Listed weight: 202 lb (92 kg)

Career information
- High school: Mansfield Summit (Arlington, Texas)
- College: TCU (2016–2019)
- NFL draft: 2020: 7th round, 236th overall pick

Career history
- Green Bay Packers (2020–2022); Carolina Panthers (2023)*; San Antonio Brahmas (2024)*
- * Offseason or practice squad member only

Career NFL statistics
- Total tackles: 14
- Sacks: 1
- Stats at Pro Football Reference

Vernon Keith Scott II (born September 11, 1997) is an American professional football safety. He played college football at TCU. He played in the National Football League (NFL) for the Green Bay Packers.

== College career ==
Scott played college football at TCU coming out of Mansfield Summit High School. He saw playing time in 11 games as a freshman. As a sophomore, Scott mainly played special teams. During his junior season in 2018, he made one interception in the Cheez-It Bowl. As a senior in 2019, he started 10 games and ranked fourth on his team with 44 tackles while also forcing two fumbles. Scott made seven pass breakups and had a 98-yard interception return for a touchdown against Oklahoma.

== Professional career ==
Pre-draft measurables
Height	Weight
6 ft 1 in (1.85 m)	206 lb (93 kg)
All values from Pro Day

=== Green Bay Packers ===
Scott was selected in the seventh round with the 236th overall pick in the 2020 NFL draft by the Green Bay Packers. He was signed on June 1, 2020.

In Week 2 of the 2020 season against the Detroit Lions, Scott recorded his first career sack on Matthew Stafford during the 42–21 win.

On August 23, 2022, Scott was waived/injured and placed on injured reserve. On April 14, 2023, Scott was released.

=== Carolina Panthers ===
On May 16, 2023, Scott signed with the Carolina Panthers. He was waived on June 15, 2023.

=== San Antonio Brahmas ===
On January 19, 2024, Scott signed with the San Antonio Brahmas of the United Football League (UFL). He was released on March 10, 2024.

== NFL career statistics ==
=== Regular season ===
Year	Team	Games		Tackles				Interceptions						Fumbles	
Year	Team	GP	GS	Comb	Total	Ast	Sck	PD	Int	Yds	Avg	Lng	TDs	FF	FR
2020	GB	15	0	11	11	0	1.0	0	0	0	0.0	0	0	0	0
2021	GB	3	0	0	0	0	0.0	0	0	0	0.0	0	0	0	0
Career		18	0	11	11	0	1.0	0	0	0	0.0	0	0	0	0
Source: NFL.com

=== Postseason ===
Year	Team	Games		Tackles				Interceptions						Fumbles	
Year	Team	GP	GS	Comb	Total	Ast	Sck	PD	Int	Yds	Avg	Lng	TDs	FF	FR
2021	GB	1	0	1	0	1	0	0	0	0	0.0	0	0	0	0
Career		1	0	1	0	1	0	0	0	0	0.0	0	0	0	0
Source: pro-football-reference.com
