= Lucas Patrick =

American football player (born 1993)

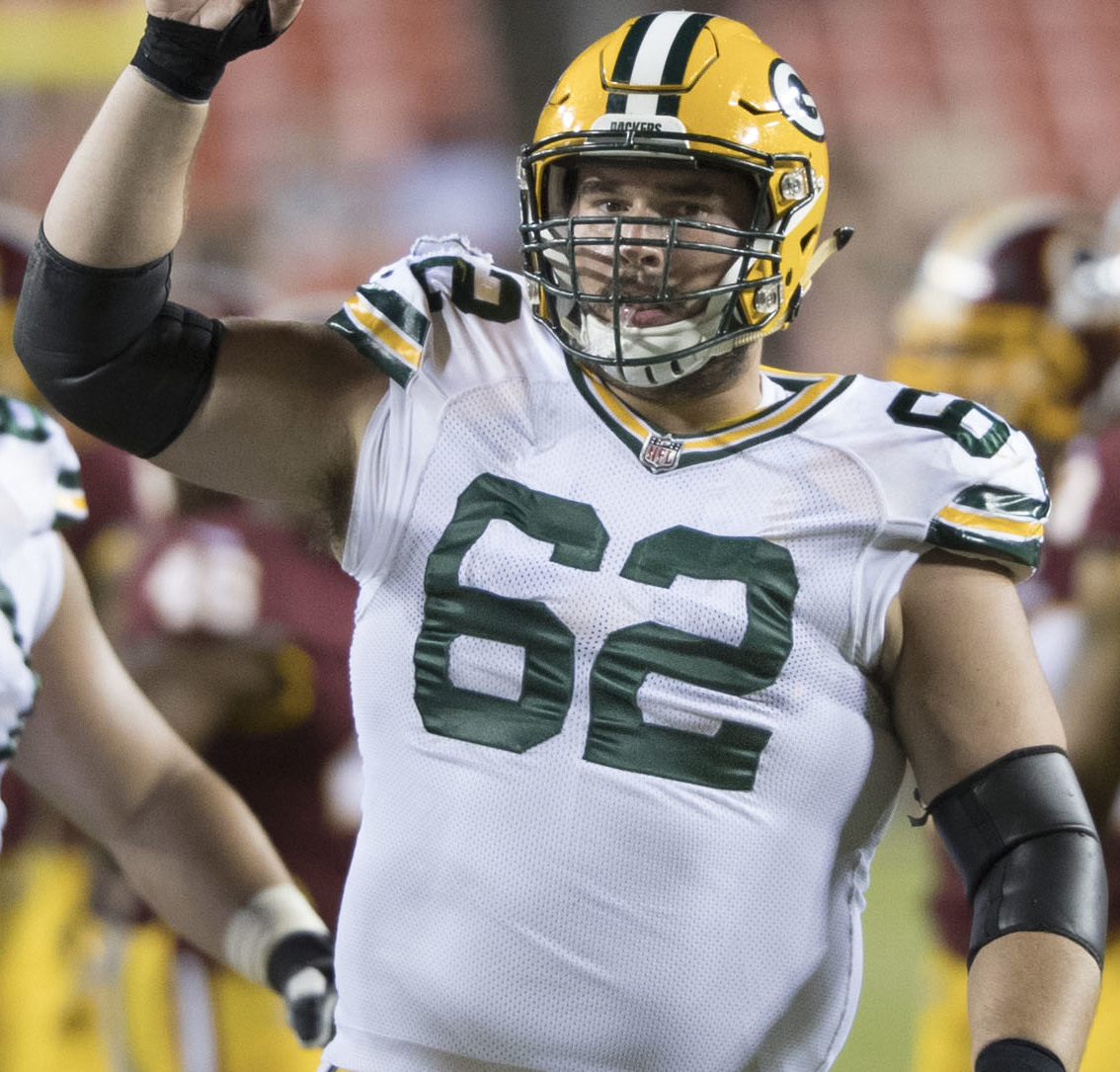
- Patrick with the Green Bay Packers in 2017

No. 63 – Washington Commanders
- Positions: Center, Guard
- Roster status: Active

Personal information
- Born: July 30, 1993 (age 33); Brentwood, Tennessee, U.S.
- Listed height: 6 ft 3 in (1.91 m)
- Listed weight: 313 lb (142 kg)

Career information
- High school: Brentwood
- College: Duke (2011–2015)
- NFL draft: 2016: undrafted

Career history
- Green Bay Packers (2016–2021); Chicago Bears (2022–2023); New Orleans Saints (2024); Cincinnati Bengals (2025); New York Giants (2026)*; Washington Commanders (2026–present)
- * Offseason or practice squad member only

Career NFL statistics as of 2026
- Games played: 113
- Games started: 65
- Fumble recoveries: 5
- Stats at Pro Football Reference

Lucas Carter Patrick (born July 30, 1993) is an American professional football center and guard for the Washington Commanders of the National Football League (NFL). Patrick played college football for the Duke Blue Devils and has played for several NFL teams.

== Early life ==
Patrick played high school football at Brentwood High School in Brentwood, Tennessee and was a three-year letterman. His senior year in 2010, he earned Tennessee Sports Writers Association First-team 6A All-State honors, was named to The Tennessean’s Dream Team, was a team captain and played in the Toyota Tennessee East vs. West All-Star Classic on December 11, 2010. He also participated in track and field at Brentwood.

== College career ==
Patrick lettered for the Duke Blue Devils of Duke University from 2012 to 2015. He was redshirted in 2011. On March 24, 2012, he had surgery to repair a fractured left ankle. Patrick missed the first eight games of the 2012 season while recovering from the surgery. He then played in the final five games of the season and played 137 snaps. He played in all 14 games, starting 1, in 2013 and played 340 snaps. Patrick's one start was at right tackle in place of the injured Perry Simmons in the Chick-fil-A Bowl. Patrick started 12 games at left guard, missed one game due to injury and played 633 snaps in 2014. He started all 13 games, played 1,067 snaps and recorded one solo tackle in 2015. He was named Honorable mention All-Atlantic Coast Conference by both the conference's head coaches and the Atlantic Coast Sports Media Association. Patrick also earned ESPN All-Bowl Team honors in 2015. He played in 44 games, starting 26, during his college career and played 2,211 snaps. In January 2017, Patrick played in the Tropic Bowl, a college football all-star game. He graduated from Duke in December 2015 with a degree in history.

== Professional career ==
=== Pre-draft ===
Patrick was rated the 36th best offensive guard in the 2016 NFL draft by NFLDraftScout.com.

Pre-draft measurables
| Height | Weight | Arm length | Hand span | Wingspan | 40-yard dash | 10-yard split | 20-yard split | 20-yard shuttle | Three-cone drill | Vertical jump | Broad jump | Bench press |
|---|---|---|---|---|---|---|---|---|---|---|---|---|
| 6 ft 3 1/2 in (1.92 m) | 313 lb (142 kg) | 32 1/4 in (0.82 m) | 9 3/4 in (0.25 m) | 6 ft 7 5/8 in (2.02 m) | 5.26 s | 1.60 s | 2.74 s | 4.66 s | 7.77 s | 29 in (0.74 m) | 8 ft 10 in (2.69 m) | 29 reps |
All values from Duke Pro Day

=== Green Bay Packers ===
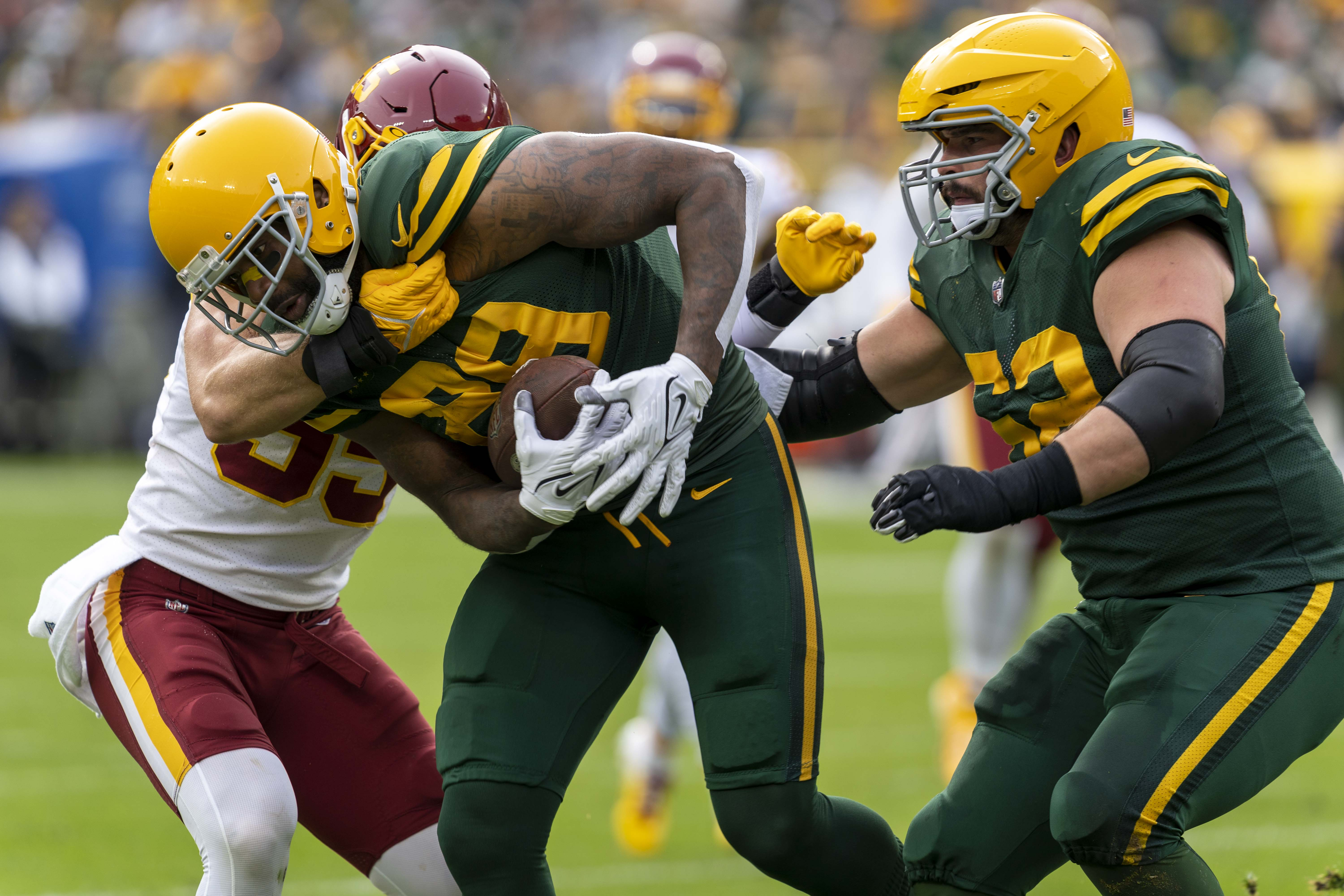
Patrick (right) playing for the Packers in 2021.

After going undrafted, Patrick signed with the Green Bay Packers on June 1, 2016. He was waived by the Packers on September 3 and signed to the team's practice squad on September 5, 2016. He signed a reserve/future contract with the Packers on January 24, 2017.

Patrick made the Packers' final roster in 2017, playing in 12 games, starting two at guard.

He was re-signed on March 13, 2018.

On December 28, 2019, Patrick signed a two-year contract extension with the Packers. The next day, Patrick replaced an injured Corey Linsley at center during a Week 17 victory over the Detroit Lions, despite primarily playing as a guard for most of the season.

=== Chicago Bears ===
On March 16, 2022, Patrick signed a two-year contract with the Chicago Bears. Patrick announced he would play at center for the Bears. After alternating with Teven Jenkins at right guard the first two games, he was named the starter in Week 3, but moved to left guard in Week 5 following an injury to Cody Whitehair. Patrick would get the starting job at center by Week 7 against the New England Patriots, but left the game in the first quarter with a toe injury. Patrick was placed on injured reserve on October 27 and was ruled out for the rest of the season.

Patrick entered the 2023 season as the Bears starting center, starting 15 games.

=== New Orleans Saints ===
On May 13, 2024, Patrick signed a one-year contract with the New Orleans Saints. He appeared in 11 games (10 starts) for New Orleans, playing 79% of the team's offensive snaps. On December 28, Patrick was placed on injured reserve with a knee injury, ending his season.

=== Cincinnati Bengals ===
On March 21, 2025, Patrick signed a one-year contract with the Cincinnati Bengals. He was named the Week 1 starting right guard, but suffered a calf injury in the game and was placed on injured reserve on September 9. On October 16, Patrick was activated ahead of Cincinnati's Week 7 matchup against the Pittsburgh Steelers.

=== New York Giants ===
On April 6, 2026, Patrick signed a one-year contract with the New York Giants. On August 30, after battling many injuries during camp, Patrick was released during final roster cuts.

=== Washington Commanders ===
On September 16, 2026, Patrick signed with the Washington Commanders. Despite not being with the team during training camp, the Commanders made Patrick their starting center in Week 3 to replace Nick Allegretti.
