= Kamal Martin =

American football player (born 1998)

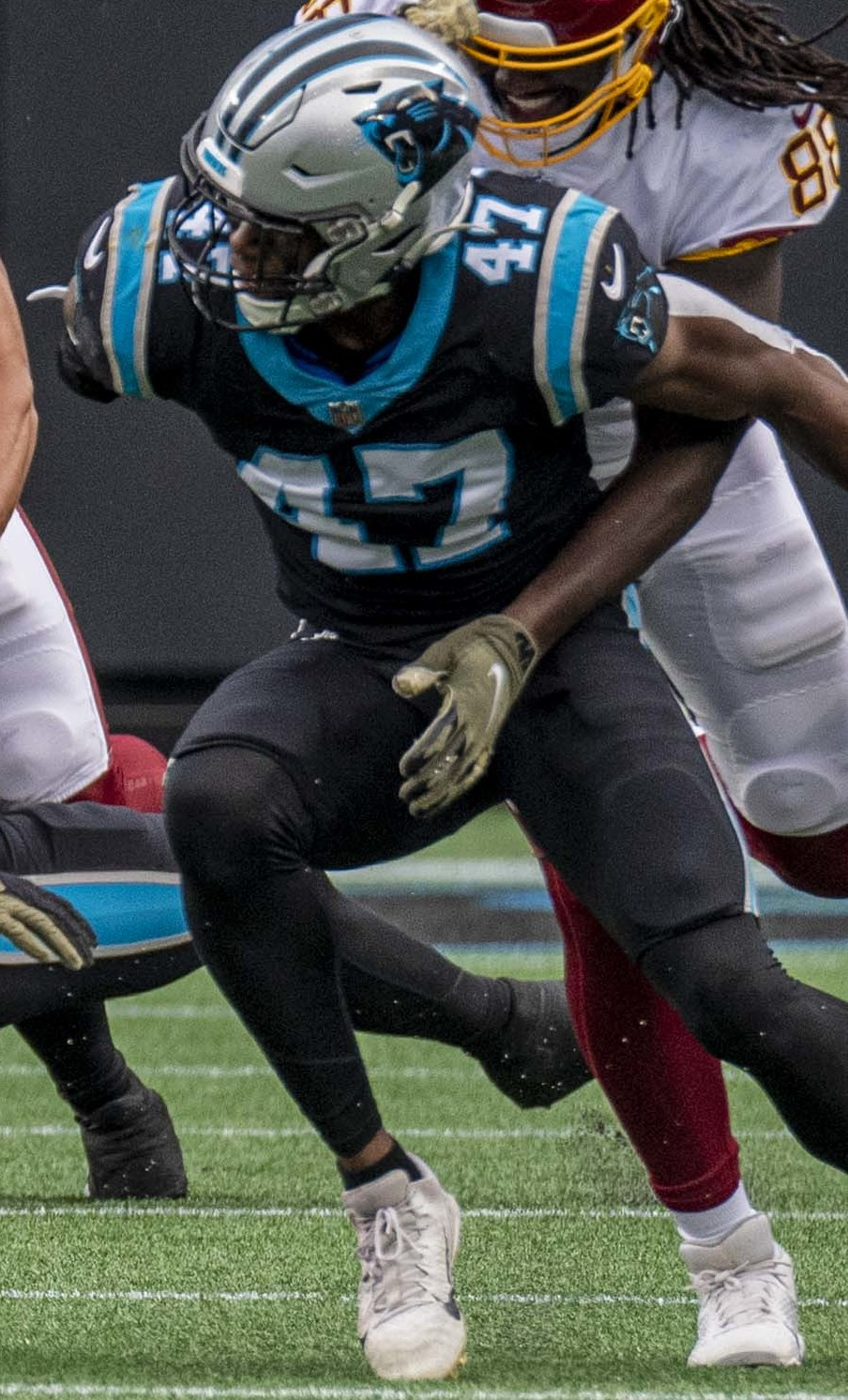
- Martin with the Carolina Panthers in 2021

No. 54, 47
- Position: Linebacker

Personal information
- Born: June 17, 1998 (age 28); Burnsville, Minnesota, U.S.
- Listed height: 6 ft 3 in (1.91 m)
- Listed weight: 240 lb (109 kg)

Career information
- High school: Burnsville
- College: Minnesota (2016–2019)
- NFL draft: 2020: 5th round, 175th overall pick

Career history
- Green Bay Packers (2020); Carolina Panthers (2021)

Career NFL statistics
- Total tackles: 26
- Sacks: 1.0
- Stats at Pro Football Reference

Kamal Adrian Martin (born June 17, 1998) is an American former professional football player who was a linebacker in the National Football League (NFL). He played college football for the Minnesota Golden Gophers, and was selected by the Green Bay Packers in the fifth round of the 2020 NFL draft. He also played for the Carolina Panthers.

== Early life ==
Martin was born and grew up in Burnsville, Minnesota and attended Burnsville High School, where he played quarterback and safety on the football team. He was named first-team All-State by the Associated Press as an all-purpose performer after completing 63 of 117 passes for 877 yards and nine touchdowns with one interception and rushing 400 yards and eight touchdowns on offense and recording 79 tackles, two forced fumbles, one interception and 13 pass breakups on defense. In 2015, Burnsville won a conference championship, a section championship, and made its first appearance in the state playoffs in 20 years.

== College career ==
Martin played mostly as a reserve linebacker as a freshman, playing in all 13 of Minnesota's games with one start and 10 tackles and one interception. He became a starter going into his sophomore season and finished the year with 42 tackles, 6.5 tackles for a loss, one interception, two forced fumbles and two fumble recoveries. As a junior he made 59 tackles, including tackles 3.5 for loss, and two passes broken up in twelve games but did not play in the team's bowl game due to a violation of team rules. Martin's senior season was cut short after eight games due to injury, but he was named honorable mention All-Big Ten Conference after making 66 tackles with 2.5 tackles for loss, one sack, two interceptions, and two forced fumbles.

== Professional career ==
Pre-draft measurables
Height	Weight	Arm length	Hand span
6 ft 2 7/8 in (1.90 m)	240 lb (109 kg)	34 in (0.86 m)	10 1/8 in (0.26 m)
All values from NFL Combine

=== Green Bay Packers ===
The Green Bay Packers selected Martin in the fifth round (175th overall) of the 2020 NFL draft. He signed his rookie contract on July 9, 2020. On September 2, 2020, it was reported that Martin had undergone surgery to repair a torn meniscus in his left knee and would be out for at least six weeks. The Packers placed him on injured reserve on September 7. The Packers activated him off injured reserve on October 24, 2020. He made his NFL debut the following day against the Houston Texans, recording six solo tackles (including one for loss) during the 35–20 victory. Martin was placed on the reserve/COVID-19 list by the team on November 3, 2020, and activated six days later. On November 29, 2020, Martin recorded his first career sack on Mitchell Trubisky during a Week 12 win over the Chicago Bears on Sunday Night Football.

On August 23, 2021, Martin was released by the Packers.

=== Carolina Panthers ===
On September 10, 2021, Martin was signed to the practice squad of the Carolina Panthers. He was promoted to the active roster on October 4, 2021. He was waived on August 14, 2022, and was placed on injured reserve the next day. He was released on August 20.

== NFL career statistics ==
=== Regular season ===
Year	Team	GP	GS	Tackles					Interceptions						Fumbles	
Year	Team	GP	GS	Total	Solo	Ast	Sck	SFTY	PDef	Int	Yds	Avg	Lng	TDs	FF	FR
2020	GB	10	6	20	13	7	1.0	0	0	0	0	0	0	0	0	0
Total		10	6	20	13	7	1.0	0	0	0	0	0	0	0	0	0
Source: NFL.com

=== Postseason ===
Year	Team	GP	GS	Tackles					Interceptions						Fumbles	
Year	Team	GP	GS	Total	Solo	Ast	Sck	SFTY	PDef	Int	Yds	Avg	Lng	TDs	FF	FR
2020	GB	2	0	2	1	1	0.0	0	0	0	0	0	0	0	0	0
Total		2	0	2	1	1	0.0	0	0	0	0	0	0	0	0	0
Source: pro-football-reference.com
