= 2021 Green Bay Packers season =

103rd season in franchise history

- Owner: Green Bay Packers Inc.
- General manager: Brian Gutekunst
- Head coach: Matt LaFleur
- Offensive coordinator: Nathaniel Hackett
- Defensive coordinator: Joe Barry
- Home stadium: Lambeau Field

Results
- Record: 13–4
- Division place: 1st NFC North
- Playoffs: Lost Divisional Playoffs (vs. 49ers) 10–13
- All-Pros: 3: QB Aaron Rodgers (1st team); WR Davante Adams (1st team); ILB De'Vondre Campbell (1st team)
- Pro Bowlers: 3: QB Aaron Rodgers; WR Davante Adams; NT Kenny Clark

Uniform
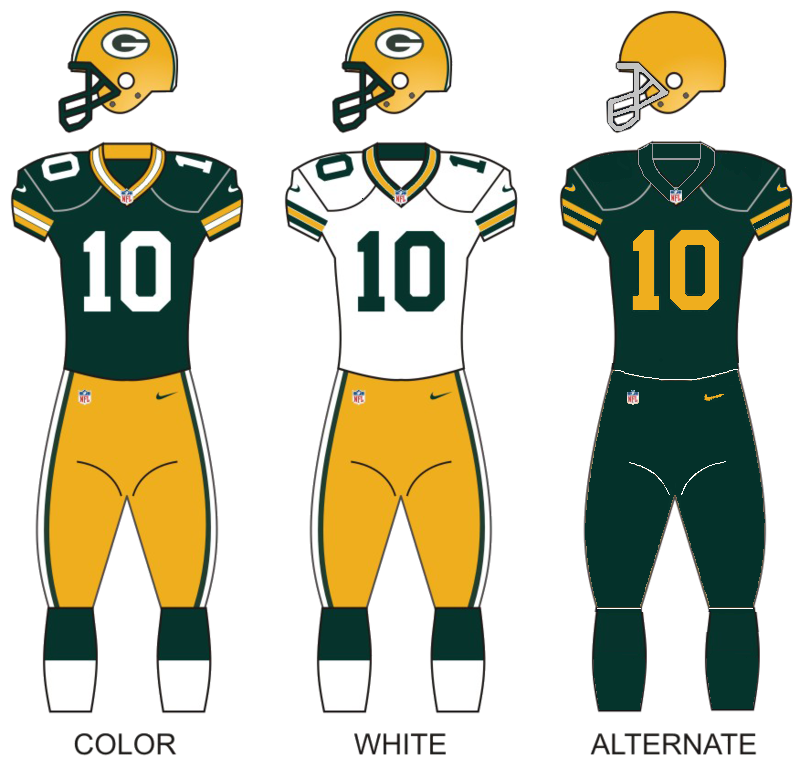

The 2021 season was the Green Bay Packers' 101st season in the National Football League (NFL), their 103rd overall and their third under head coach Matt LaFleur.

With a Week 15 win over the Baltimore Ravens, the Packers won the NFC North for the third consecutive year. With their victory over the Minnesota Vikings in Week 17, they earned home field advantage, a first round bye, and the No. 1 seed in the NFC playoffs. They also became the first team in NFL history to finish three consecutive seasons with 13 or more wins. Aaron Rodgers was also named MVP for the fourth time and the second year in a row.

However, their season came to an abrupt end for the third time in a row, with a 13–10 upset loss to the underdog San Francisco 49ers in the Divisional Round; this marked the Packers' fourth loss against the 49ers in the playoffs and in the divisional round of the NFC playoffs since Aaron Rodgers became the starting quarterback, with it also being their second home divisional loss in the Rodgers era.

While the Packers were able to clinch the top seed and clinching the NFC’s best record, the Packers special teams received scrutiny during the entire season as they were ranked 32nd in the NFL by the Football Outsiders DVOA, Packer Central, and Sports Illustrated writer Rick Gosselin. This special teams unit was one of the primary reasons why the Packers lost in the NFC Divisional Game to the 49ers. Following the loss to the 49ers, Maurice Drayton was fired as special teams coordinator. The Packers had their sixth stock sale during the season.

== Player movements ==
=== Trades ===
Date	Player incoming	Player outgoing
July 28, 2021	To Green Bay Packers; Randall Cobb	To Houston Texans; Draft pick
August 17, 2021	To Green Bay Packers; Isaac Yiadom	To New York Giants; Josh Jackson
August 24, 2021	To Green Bay Packers; 2022 seventh-round Draft pick	To Houston Texans; Ka'dar Hollman
August 31, 2021	To Green Bay Packers; Corey Bojorquez; 2023 seventh-round Draft pick	To Los Angeles Rams; 2023 sixth-round Draft pick

=== Free agents ===
Position	Player	Free agency tag	Date signed	2021 team
DE	Montravius Adams	UFA	March 19	New England Patriots
WR	Tavon Austin	UFA	August 6	Jacksonville Jaguars
LB	James Burgess	UFA	June 2	San Francisco 49ers
RB	Tyler Ervin	UFA		
NT	Damon Harrison	UFA	November 13	Retired
RB	Aaron Jones	UFA	March 26	Green Bay Packers
CB	Kevin King	UFA	March 26	Green Bay Packers
TE	Marcedes Lewis	UFA	March 30	Green Bay Packers
C	Corey Linsley	UFA	March 17	Los Angeles Chargers
S	Will Redmond	UFA	April 2	Green Bay Packers
G	Lane Taylor	UFA	April 16	Houston Texans
OT	Jared Veldheer	UFA	May 27	Retired
RB	Jamaal Williams	UFA	March 19	Detroit Lions
DE	Billy Winn	UFA		
QB	Tim Boyle	RFA	March 22	Detroit Lions
S	Raven Greene	RFA	May 5	Tampa Bay Buccaneers
DE	Tyler Lancaster	RFA	March 30	Green Bay Packers
CB	Parry Nickerson	RFA	May 17	Minnesota Vikings
CB	Chandon Sullivan	RFA	April 23	Green Bay Packers
TE	Robert Tonyan	RFA	May 27	Green Bay Packers
WR	Allen Lazard	ERFA	July 27	Green Bay Packers
WR	Malik Taylor	ERFA	May 21	Green Bay Packers
OLB	Randy Ramsey	ERFA	March 18	Green Bay Packers
OT	Yosh Nijman	ERFA	May 6	Green Bay Packers

=== Additions ===
Position	Player	Former team	Date
LS	Joe Fortunato	Dallas Cowboys	March 24
QB	Kurt Benkert	Atlanta Falcons	May 17
QB	Blake Bortles	Los Angeles Rams	May 24
WR	DeAndre Thompkins	Pittsburgh Steelers	May 26
ILB	De'Vondre Campbell	Arizona Cardinals	June 9
QB	Jake Dolegala	New England Patriots	June 10
OT	Dennis Kelly	Tennessee Titans	July 29
NT	Josh Avery	Alphas (Spring League)	August 4
OLB	Chauncey Rivers	Baltimore Ravens	August 6
CB	Dominique Martin	Tarleton State (Spring League)	August 12
QB	Jake Dolegala	New England Patriots	August 18
WR	Damon Hazelton	Houston Texans	August 20
DE	Abdullah Anderson	Pittsburgh Steelers	August 25
CB	Stephen Denmark	Pittsburgh Steelers	August 25
CB	Rojesterman Farris	Denver Broncos	August 27
OLB	LaDarius Hamilton	Tampa Bay Buccaneers	September 17
TE	Tyler Davis	Indianapolis Colts	September 28
CB	Rasul Douglas	Arizona Cardinals	October 6
ILB	Jaylon Smith	Dallas Cowboys	October 7
OLB	Whitney Mercilus	Houston Texans	October 21
LS	Steven Wirtel	Green Bay Packers	November 2
RB	Patrick Taylor	Green Bay Packers	November 4
LB	Tipa Galeai	Green Bay Packers	November 16
G	Ben Braden	Green Bay Packers	November 23
WR	Juwann Winfree	Green Bay Packers	December 14
S	Shawn Davis	Green Bay Packers	December 18

=== Subtractions ===
Position	Player	2021 team	Release date
LB	Christian Kirksey	Houston Texans	February 19
OT	Rick Wagner		February 19
TE	John Lovett		March 12
CB	KeiVarae Russell	New Orleans Saints	May 24
RB	Mike Weber	New York Giants	June 9
NT	Anthony Rush	Tennessee Titans	June 10
QB	Blake Bortles	New Orleans Saints	July 27
QB	Jake Dolegala	New England Patriots	July 27
LS	Joe Fortunato		August 5
G	Jon Dietzen	Green Bay Packers	August 16
P	Ryan Winslow	Arizona Cardinals	August 16
G	Zack Johnson	Arizona Cardinals	August 16
CB	Stanford Samuels III		August 18
CB	Dominique Martin		August 20
TE	Daniel Crawford		August 23
NT	Josh Avery	Carolina Panthers	August 24
ILB	Kamal Martin	Carolina Panthers	August 24
WR	Chris Blair	Green Bay Packers	August 25
QB	Jake Dolegala	Miami Dolphins	August 27
TE	Jace Sternberger	Seattle Seahawks	September 21
LS	Hunter Bradley		November 2
LB	Jaylon Smith	New York Giants	November 2
LB	LaDarius Hamilton	Green Bay Packers	November 13
S	Will Redmond	Indianapolis Colts	November 22
G	Ben Braden	Green Bay Packers	January 10
DE	Kingsley Keke		January 19

=== Retirements ===
Position	Player
OG	Simon Stepaniak
CB	Tramon Williams
OT	Jared Veldheer
NT	Damon Harrison

=== Draft ===
2021 Green Bay Packers Draft
Round	Selection	Player	Position	College	Notes
1	29	Eric Stokes	CB	Georgia	
2	62	Josh Myers	C	Ohio State	
3	85	Amari Rodgers	WR	Clemson	From Tennessee (Note: Green Bay traded their 3rd round pick (#92) and 4th round pick (#135th) for the Tennessee Titans 3rd round pick (#85).)
4	142	Royce Newman	OG	Ole Miss	Compensatory pick
5	173	Tedarrell Slaton	DT	Florida	
5	178	Shemar Jean-Charles	CB	Appalachian State	Compensatory pick
6	214	Cole Van Lanen	OG	Wisconsin	
6	220	Isaiah McDuffie	LB	Boston College	Compensatory pick
7	256	Kylin Hill	RB	Mississippi State	

Notes/Trades

=== Undrafted free agent additions ===
2021 Undrafted Free Agents
Position	Player	College	Date
G	Jacob Capra	San Diego State	May 3
OT	Coy Cronk	Iowa	May 3
G	Jon Dietzen	Wisconsin	May 3
WR	Bailey Gaither	San Jose State	May 3
DE	Jack Heflin	Iowa	May 3
OLB	Carlo Kemp	Michigan	May 3
SS	Christian Uphoff	Illinois State	May 3
TE	Daniel Crawford	Northern Illinois	August 3

=== Roster cuts ===
The roster was cut to 53 on August 31, 2021.

Position	Player	2021 team
DE	Abdullah Anderson	Green Bay Packers
WR	Reggie Begelton	Calgary Stampeders
QB	Kurt Benkert	Green Bay Packers
G	Ben Braden	Green Bay Packers
G	Jacob Capra	Buffalo Bills
OT	Coy Cronk	Jacksonville Jaguars
CB	Stephen Denmark	
CB	Kabion Ento	Green Bay Packers
CB	Rojesterman Farris	Denver Broncos
S	Innis Gaines	Green Bay Packers
OLB	Tipa Galeai	Green Bay Packers
ILB	De'Jon Harris	Washington Football Team
WR	Damon Hazelton	
TE	Bronson Kaufusi	Green Bay Packers
DE	Carlo Kemp	Denver Broncos
K	JJ Molson	Green Bay Packers
DE	Willington Previlon	Tampa Bay Buccaneers
OLB	Delontae Scott	Pittsburgh Steelers
P	J. K. Scott	Jacksonville Jaguars
WR	Equanimeous St. Brown	Green Bay Packers
RB	Patrick Taylor	Green Bay Packers
S	Christian Uphoff	
OT	Cole Van Lanen	Green Bay Packers
ILB	Ray Wilborn	Green Bay Packers
RB	Dexter Williams	New York Giants
WR	Juwann Winfree	Green Bay Packers

== Staff ==
2021 Green Bay Packers staff
Front office: Owner: Publicly held corporation; Executive committee – Board of directors; President/CEO – Mark Murphy; General manager – Brian Gutekunst; Executive vice president/director of football operations – Russ Ball; Co-director of player personnel – John Wojciechowski; Co-director of player personnel – Jon-Eric Sullivan; Director of football operations – Milt Hendrickson; Director of college scouting – Matt Malaspina; Assistant director of college scouting - Patrick Moore; Director of Pro Personnel - Richmond Williams; Director of football administration/player finance – Melaine Marohl; National scout – Sam Seale; Director of performance psychology/team behavioral health clinician – Chris Carr; Director of player engagement – Grey Ruegamer; Player personnel executive - Lee Gissendaner; Head coaches: Head coach – Matt LaFleur; Offensive coaches: Offensive coordinator – Nathaniel Hackett; Quarterbacks/passing game coordinator – Luke Getsy; Running backs – Ben Sirmans; Wide receivers – Jason Vrable; Tight ends – Justin Outten; Offensive line/run game coordinator – Adam Stenavich; Assistant offensive line – Luke Butkus; Offensive quality control – Ryan Mahaffey; Offensive quality control – Tim Zetts; Coaching assistant – Ruvell Martin	Defensive coaches: Defensive coordinator – Joe Barry; Defensive line – Jerry Montgomery; Outside linebackers – Mike Smith; Inside linebackers – Kirk Olivadotti; Defensive backs/passing game coordinator – Jerry Gray; Assistant defensive backs – Ryan Downard; Defensive quality control – Wendel Davis; Defensive quality control – Justin Hood; Senior analyst – John Dunn; Special teams coaches: Special teams coordinator – Maurice Drayton; Assistant special teams – Rayna Stewart; Special teams assistant/game management specialist – Connor Lewis; Strength and conditioning: Strength and conditioning coordinator – Chris Gizzi; Strength and conditioning assistant – Thadeus Jackson; Strength and conditioning assistant – Mark Lovat; Strength and conditioning assistant – Grant Thorne

== Final roster ==
2021 Green Bay Packers roster
Quarterbacks (QB): 10 Jordan Love; 12 Aaron Rodgers; Running backs (RB): 28 A. J. Dillon; 33 Aaron Jones; 27 Patrick Taylor; Wide receivers (WR): 17 Davante Adams; 18 Randall Cobb; 13 Allen Lazard; 8 Amari Rodgers; 19 Equanimeous St. Brown; 83 Marquez Valdes-Scantling; 88 Juwann Winfree; Tight ends (TE): 49 Dominique Dafney; 84 Tyler Davis; 81 Josiah Deguara; 89 Marcedes Lewis	Offensive linemen (OL): 69 David Bakhtiari T; 67 Jake Hanson C; 79 Dennis Kelly T; 71 Josh Myers C; 70 Royce Newman G; 73 Yosh Nijman T; 62 Lucas Patrick C/G; 76 Jon Runyan Jr. G; 77 Billy Turner T; Defensive linemen (DL): 97 Kenny Clark NT; 95 Tyler Lancaster DE/NT; 94 Dean Lowry DE; 93 Tedarrell Slaton NT	Linebackers (LB): 51 Krys Barnes ILB; 42 Oren Burks ILB; 59 De'Vondre Campbell ILB; 40 Tipa Galeai OLB; 53 Jonathan Garvin OLB; 52 Rashan Gary OLB; 58 Isaiah McDuffie ILB; 50 Whitney Mercilus OLB; 91 Preston Smith OLB; 55 Za'Darius Smith OLB; Defensive backs (DB): 23 Jaire Alexander CB; 31 Adrian Amos SS; 41 Henry Black FS; 30 Shawn Davis SS; 29 Rasul Douglas CB; 22 Shemar Jean-Charles CB; 20 Kevin King CB; 26 Darnell Savage FS; 36 Vernon Scott SS; 21 Eric Stokes CB; 39 Chandon Sullivan CB; Special teams (ST): 7 Corey Bojorquez P; 2 Mason Crosby K; 46 Steven Wirtel LS	Practice squad: 98 Abdullah Anderson DE; 6 Kurt Benkert QB; 64 Ben Braden G; 48 Kabion Ento CB; 38 Innis Gaines FS; 54 LaDarius Hamilton OLB; 43 Peter Kalambayi ILB; 45 Bronson Kaufusi TE; 80 Josh Malone WR; 99 R. J. McIntosh DE; 65 Michal Menet C; 11 J. J. Molson K; 82 David Moore WR; 78 Cole Van Lanen T; 34 Kerrith Whyte RB; 57 Ray Wilborn ILB; Reserve: 32 Kylin Hill RB (IR); 74 Elgton Jenkins T (IR); 56 Randy Ramsey OLB (IR); 47 Chauncey Rivers OLB (IR); 44 Ty Summers ILB (IR); 86 Malik Taylor WR (IR); 85 Robert Tonyan TE (IR); Rookies in italics 53 active, 7 reserve, 16 practice squad

== Preseason ==
The Packers' preseason opponents and schedule were announced on May 12.

Week	Date	Opponent	Result	Record	Venue	Recap
1	August 14	Houston Texans	L 7–26	0–1	Lambeau Field	Recap
2	August 21	New York Jets	L 14–23	0–2	Lambeau Field	Recap
3	August 28	at Buffalo Bills	L 0–19	0–3	Highmark Stadium	Recap

== Regular season ==
=== Schedule ===
The first week was announced 11 hours ahead of the rest of the season on May 12.

Week	Date	Opponent	Result	Record	Venue	Recap
1	September 12	at New Orleans Saints	**L** 3–38	0–1	TIAA Bank Field (Note: Due to Hurricane Ida, the Packers' Week 1 game at the New Orleans Saints was relocated to TIAA Bank Field in Jacksonville, Florida. While Caesars Superdome did not receive any direct damage, power outages were not expected to be resolved within the city of New Orleans by the day of kickoff.)	Recap
2	September 20	**Detroit Lions**	**W** 35–17	1–1	Lambeau Field	Recap
3	September 26	at San Francisco 49ers	**W** 30–28	2–1	Levi's Stadium	Recap
4	October 3	Pittsburgh Steelers	**W** 27–17	3–1	Lambeau Field	Recap
5	October 10	at Cincinnati Bengals	**W** 25–22 (OT)	4–1	Paul Brown Stadium	Recap
6	October 17	at **Chicago Bears**	**W** 24–14	5–1	Soldier Field	Recap
7	October 24	Washington Football Team	**W** 24–10	6–1	Lambeau Field	Recap
8	October 28	at Arizona Cardinals	**W** 24–21	7–1	State Farm Stadium	Recap
9	November 7	at Kansas City Chiefs	**L** 7–13	7–2	Arrowhead Stadium	Recap
10	November 14	Seattle Seahawks	**W** 17–0	8–2	Lambeau Field	Recap
11	November 21	at **Minnesota Vikings**	**L** 31–34	8–3	U.S. Bank Stadium	Recap
12	November 28	Los Angeles Rams	**W** 36–28	9–3	Lambeau Field	Recap
13	Bye					
14	December 12	**Chicago Bears**	**W** 45–30	10–3	Lambeau Field	Recap
15	December 19	at Baltimore Ravens	**W** 31–30	11–3	M&T Bank Stadium	Recap
16	December 25	Cleveland Browns	**W** 24–22	12–3	Lambeau Field	Recap
17	January 2, 2022	**Minnesota Vikings**	**W** 37–10	13–3	Lambeau Field	Recap
18	January 9, 2022	at **Detroit Lions**	**L** 30–37	13–4	Ford Field	Recap

Note: Intra-division opponents are in bold text.

=== Game summaries ===
==== Week 1: at New Orleans Saints ====
Week 1: Green Bay Packers at New Orleans Saints – Game summary

Quarter	1	2	3	4	Total
Packers	0	3	0	0	**3**
**Saints**	3	14	7	14	**38**

at TIAA Bank Field, Jacksonville, Florida

- Date: September 12
- Game time: 4:25 p.m. EDT/3:25 p.m. CDT
- Game weather: Sunny, 83 °F (28 °C)
- Game attendance: 35,242
- Referee: Carl Cheffers
- TV announcers (Fox): Joe Buck, Troy Aikman, Erin Andrews and Tom Rinaldi
- Recap, Game Book

Game information

**First quarter**

- NO – Aldrick Rosas 44-yard field goal, 11:00. Saints 3–0. **Drive: 9 plays, 49 yards, 4:00.**

**Second quarter**

- NO – Alvin Kamara 3-yard pass from Jameis Winston (Aldrick Rosas kick), 14:18. Saints 10–0. **Drive: 15 plays, 76 yards, 7:51.**
- NO – Juwan Johnson 1-yard pass from Jameis Winston (Aldrick Rosas kick), 1:07. Saints 17–0. **Drive: 15 plays, 80 yards, 10:00.**
- GB – Mason Crosby 39-yard field goal, 0:00. Saints 17–3. **Drive: 6 plays, 54 yards, 1:07.**

**Third quarter**

- NO – Chris Hogan 10-yard pass from Jameis Winston (Aldrick Rosas kick), 3:07. Saints 24–3. **Drive: 3 plays, 12 yards, 1:26.**

**Fourth quarter**

- NO – Juwan Johnson 8-yard pass from Jameis Winston (Aldrick Rosas kick), 14:54. Saints 31–3. **Drive: 4 plays, 21 yards, 1:41.**
- NO – Deonte Harris 55-yard pass from Jameis Winston (Aldrick Rosas kick), 10:46. Saints 38–3. **Drive: 4 plays, 66 yards, 2:14.**

**Top passers**

- GB – Aaron Rodgers – 15/28, 133 yards, 2 INT
- NO – Jameis Winston – 14/20, 148 yards, 5 TD

**Top rushers**

- GB – A. J. Dillon – 4 rushes, 19 yards
- NO – Alvin Kamara – 20 rushes, 83 yards

**Top receivers**

- GB – Davante Adams – 5 receptions, 56 yards
- NO – Juwan Johnson – 3 receptions, 21 yards, 2 TD

The Packers start off their season with a 35-point loss to the New Orleans Saints. This took place in Jacksonville due to expected power outages to the Superdome.

==== Week 2: vs. Detroit Lions ====
Week 2: Detroit Lions at Green Bay Packers – Game summary

Quarter	1	2	3	4	Total
Lions	7	10	0	0	**17**
**Packers**	7	7	14	7	**35**

at Lambeau Field, Green Bay, Wisconsin

- Date: September 20
- Game time: 7:15 p.m. CDT
- Game weather: Cloudy, 73 °F (23 °C)
- Game attendance: 77,240
- Referee: Adrian Hill
- TV announcers (ESPN): Steve Levy, Brian Griese, Louis Riddick, Lisa Salters and John Parry
- Recap, Game Book

Game information

**First quarter**

- DET – Quintez Cephus 5-yard pass from Jared Goff (Austin Seibert kick), 10:36. Lions 7–0. **Drive: 7 plays, 75 yards, 4:24.**
- GB – Aaron Jones 4-yard pass from Aaron Rodgers (Mason Crosby kick), 3:45. Tied 7–7. **Drive: 11 plays, 75 yards, 6:51.**

**Second quarter**

- DET – T. J. Hockenson 8-yard pass from Jared Goff (Austin Seibert kick), 7:22. Lions 14–7. **Drive: 9 plays, 61 yards, 4:59.**
- GB – Aaron Jones 1-yard pass from Aaron Rodgers (Mason Crosby kick), 1:52. Tied 14–14. **Drive: 10 plays, 56 yards, 5:30.**
- DET – Austin Seibert 43-yard field goal, 0:03. Lions 17–14. **Drive: 7 plays, 35 yards, 1:49.**

**Third quarter**

- GB – Robert Tonyan 22-yard pass from Aaron Rodgers (Mason Crosby kick), 10:26. Packers 21–17. **Drive: 8 plays, 87 yards, 4:34.**
- GB – Aaron Jones 11-yard pass from Aaron Rodgers (Mason Crosby kick), 0:07. Packers 28–17. **Drive: 11 plays, 75 yards, 5:46.**

**Fourth quarter**

- GB – Aaron Jones 1-yard run (Mason Crosby kick), 12:42. Packers 35–17. **Drive: 5 plays, 23 yards, 2:21.**

**Top passers**

- DET – Jared Goff – 26/36, 246 yards, 2 TD, INT
- GB – Aaron Rodgers – 22/27, 255 yards, 4 TD

**Top rushers**

- DET – Jared Goff – 4 rushes, 46 yards
- GB – Aaron Jones – 17 rushes, 67 yards, TD

**Top receivers**

- DET – T. J. Hockenson – 8 receptions, 66 yards, TD
- GB – Davante Adams – 8 receptions, 121 yards

==== Week 3: at San Francisco 49ers ====
Week 3: Green Bay Packers at San Francisco 49ers – Game summary

Quarter	1	2	3	4	Total
**Packers**	10	7	0	13	**30**
49ers	0	7	7	14	**28**

at Levi's Stadium, Santa Clara, California

- Date: September 26
- Game time: 7:20 p.m. CDT/5:20 p.m. PDT
- Game weather: Scattered clouds, 69 °F (21 °C)
- Game attendance: 69,853
- Referee: Jerome Boger
- TV announcers (NBC): Al Michaels, Cris Collinsworth, Michele Tafoya and Terry McAulay
- Recap, Game Book

Game information

**First quarter**

- GB – Mason Crosby 54-yard field goal, 10:06. Packers 3–0. **Drive: 8 plays, 39 yards, 4:54.**
- GB – Davante Adams 1-yard pass from Aaron Rodgers (Mason Crosby kick), 3:19. Packers 10–0. **Drive: 7 plays, 80 yards, 4:06.**

**Second quarter**

- GB – Aaron Jones 3-yard run (Mason Crosby kick), 1:02. Packers 17–0. **Drive: 9 plays, 87 yards, 3:46.**
- SF – Trey Lance 1-yard run (Robbie Gould kick), 0:00. Packers 17–7. **Drive: 8 plays, 32 yards, 1:02.**

**Third quarter**

- SF – Brandon Aiyuk 8-yard pass from Jimmy Garoppolo (Robbie Gould kick), 7:41. Packers 17–14. **Drive: 13 plays, 83 yards, 7:19.**

**Fourth quarter**

- GB – Marquez Valdes-Scantling 12-yard pass from Aaron Rodgers (Mason Crosby kick), 13:27. Packers 24–14. **Drive: 10 plays, 86 yards, 5:57.**
- SF – Trey Sermon 1-yard run (Robbie Gould kick), 7:48. Packers 24–21. **Drive: 9 plays, 81 yards, 5:39.**
- GB – Mason Crosby 38-yard field goal, 2:39. Packers 27–21. **Drive: 5 plays, 18 yards, 2:19.**
- SF – Kyle Juszczyk 12-yard pass from Jimmy Garoppolo (Robbie Gould kick), 0:37. 49ers 28–27. **Drive: 8 plays, 75 yards, 2:02.**
- GB – Mason Crosby 51-yard field goal, 0:00. Packers 30–28. **Drive: 6 plays, 42 yards, 0:37.**

**Top passers**

- GB – Aaron Rodgers – 23/33, 261 yards, 2 TD
- SF – Jimmy Garoppolo – 25/40, 257 yards, 2 TD, INT

**Top rushers**

- GB – Aaron Jones – 19 rushes, 82 yards, TD
- SF – Trey Sermon – 10 rushes, 31 yards, TD

**Top receivers**

- GB – Davante Adams – 12 receptions, 132 yards, TD
- SF – George Kittle – 7 receptions, 92 yards

==== Week 4: vs. Pittsburgh Steelers ====
Week 4: Pittsburgh Steelers at Green Bay Packers – Game summary

Quarter	1	2	3	4	Total
Steelers	7	3	0	7	**17**
**Packers**	0	17	10	0	**27**

at Lambeau Field, Green Bay, Wisconsin

- Date: October 3
- Game time: 3:25 p.m. CDT
- Game weather: Cloudy, 67 °F (19 °C)
- Game attendance: 78,281
- Referee: Scott Novak
- TV announcers (CBS): Jim Nantz, Tony Romo, Tracy Wolfson and Gene Steratore
- Recap, Game Book

Game information

**First quarter**

- PIT – Diontae Johnson 45-yard pass from Ben Roethlisberger (Chris Boswell kick), 10:04. Steelers 7–0. **Drive: 8 plays, 75 yards, 4:56.**

**Second quarter**

- GB – Aaron Rodgers 4-yard run (Mason Crosby kick), 13:22. Tied 7–7. **Drive: 13 plays, 64 yards, 4:51.**
- GB – Randall Cobb 23-yard pass from Aaron Rogers (Mason Crosby kick), 10:55. Packers 14–7. **Drive: 4 plays, 23 yards, 1:33.**
- PIT – Chris Boswell 52-yard field goal, 5:41. Packers 14–10. **Drive: 10 plays, 41 yards, 5:14.**
- GB – Mason Crosby 26-yard field goal, 0:05. Packers 17–10. **Drive: 13 plays, 76 yards, 5:36.**

**Third quarter**

- GB – Mason Crosby 29-yard field goal, 9:31. Packers 20–10. **Drive: 12 plays, 64 yards, 5:29.**
- GB – Randall Cobb 1-yard pass from Aaron Rogers (Mason Crosby kick), 4:46. Packers 27–10. **Drive: 4 plays, 40 yards, 2:15.**

**Fourth quarter**

- PIT – Najee Harris 1-yard run (Chris Boswell kick), 4:04. Packers 27–17. **Drive: 8 plays, 65 yards, 2:53.**

**Top passers**

- PIT – Ben Roethlisberger – 26/40, 232 yards, TD, INT
- GB – Aaron Rodgers – 20/36, 248 yards, 2 TD

**Top rushers**

- PIT – Najee Harris – 15 rushes, 62 yards, TD
- GB – A. J. Dillon – 15 rushes, 81 yards

**Top receivers**

- PIT – Diontae Johnson – 9 receptions, 92 yards, TD
- GB – Randall Cobb – 5 receptions, 69 yards, 2 TD

This was the Packers' first regular season win against the Steelers since Week 17 in 1995, and their first win against them overall since Week 2 of the 2018 Preseason. This also gave Aaron Rodgers his first regular season win over the Steelers which in turn gave him a regular season win over every team but the Packers.

==== Week 5: at Cincinnati Bengals ====
Week 5: Green Bay Packers at Cincinnati Bengals – Game summary

Quarter	1	2	3	4	OT	Total
**Packers**	0	16	3	3	3	**25**
Bengals	7	7	0	8	0	**22**

at Paul Brown Stadium, Cincinnati, Ohio

- Date: October 10
- Game time: 1:00 p.m. EDT/12:00 p.m. CDT
- Game weather: Partly sunny, 80 °F (27 °C)
- Game attendance: 64,195
- Referee: Bill Vinovich
- TV announcers (Fox): Kenny Albert, Jonathan Vilma and Lindsay Czarniak
- Recap, Game Book

Game information

**First quarter**

- CIN – Samaje Perine 4-yard pass from Joe Burrow (Evan McPherson kick), 1:15. Bengals 7–0. **Drive: 10 plays, 51 yards, 4:58.**

**Second quarter**

- GB – A. J. Dillon 12-yard pass from Aaron Rodgers (kick failed), 11:49. Bengals 7–6. **Drive: 7 plays, 75 yards, 4:26.**
- GB – Mason Crosby 44-yard field goal, 7:24. Packers 9–7. **Drive: 6 plays, 36 yards, 2:20.**
- GB – Davante Adams 5-yard pass from Aaron Rodgers (Mason Crosby kick), 1:07. Packers 16–7. **Drive: 9 plays, 81 yards, 4:48.**
- CIN – Ja'Marr Chase 70-yard pass from Joe Burrow (Evan McPherson kick), 0:36. Packers 16–14. **Drive: 2 plays, 75 yards, 0:31.**

**Third quarter**

- GB – Mason Crosby 44-yard field goal, 5:45. Packers 19–14. **Drive: 12 plays, 56 yards, 7:38.**

**Fourth quarter**

- GB – Mason Crosby 22-yard field goal, 11:20. Packers 22–14. **Drive: 7 plays, 81 yards, 3:48.**
- CIN – Joe Mixon 8-yard run (Joe Burrow–Tee Higgins pass), 3:27. Tied 22–22. **Drive: 13 plays, 75 yards, 7:53.**

**Overtime**

- GB – Mason Crosby 49-yard field goal, 1:55. Packers 25–22. **Drive: 6 plays, 29 yards, 2:19.**

**Top passers**

- GB – Aaron Rodgers – 27/39, 344 yards, 2 TD, INT
- CIN – Joe Burrow – 26/38, 281 yards, 2 TD, 2 INT

**Top rushers**

- GB – Aaron Jones – 14 rushes, 103 yards
- CIN – Samaje Perine – 11 rushes, 59 yards

**Top receivers**

- GB – Davante Adams – 11 receptions, 206 yards, TD
- CIN – Ja'Marr Chase – 6 receptions, 159 yards, TD

==== Week 6: at Chicago Bears ====
Week 6: Green Bay Packers at Chicago Bears – Game summary

Quarter	1	2	3	4	Total
**Packers**	0	10	7	7	**24**
Bears	7	0	0	7	**14**

at Soldier Field, Chicago, Illinois

- Date: October 17
- Game time: 12:00 p.m. CDT
- Game weather: Sunny, 62 °F (17 °C)
- Game attendance: 62,332
- Referee: Brad Rogers
- TV announcers (Fox): Joe Davis, Greg Olsen and Pam Oliver
- Recap, Game Book

Game information

**First quarter**

- CHI – Khalil Herbert 1-yard run (Cairo Santos kick), 6:45. Bears 7–0. **Drive: 8 plays, 80 yards, 4:24.**

**Second quarter**

- GB – Allen Lazard 1-yard pass from Aaron Rodgers (Mason Crosby kick), 9:59. Tied 7–7. **Drive: 12 plays, 80 yards, 6:14.**
- GB – Mason Crosby 39-yard field goal, 4:09. Packers 10–7. **Drive: 7 plays, 38 yards, 3:54.**

**Third quarter**

- GB – Aaron Jones 12-yard pass from Aaron Rodgers (Mason Crosby kick), 6:00. Packers 17–7. **Drive: 10 plays, 90 yards, 6:54.**

**Fourth quarter**

- CHI – Darnell Mooney 5-yard pass from Justin Fields (Cairo Santos kick), 8:44. Packers 17–14. **Drive: 10 plays, 80 yards, 6:16.**
- GB – Aaron Rodgers 6-yard run (Mason Crosby kick), 4:30. Packers 24–14. **Drive: 7 plays, 75 yards, 4:14.**

**Top passers**

- GB – Aaron Rodgers – 17/23, 195 yards, 2 TD
- CHI – Justin Fields – 16/27, 174 yards, TD, INT

**Top rushers**

- GB – Aaron Jones – 13 rushes, 76 yards
- CHI – Khalil Herbert – 19 rushes, 97 yards, TD

**Top receivers**

- GB – Davante Adams – 4 receptions, 89 yards
- CHI – Allen Robinson – 4 receptions, 53 yards

==== Week 7: vs. Washington Football Team ====
Week 7: Washington Football Team at Green Bay Packers – Game summary

Quarter	1	2	3	4	Total
Football Team	7	0	0	3	**10**
**Packers**	7	7	7	3	**24**

at Lambeau Field, Green Bay, Wisconsin

- Date: October 24
- Game time: 12:00 p.m. CDT
- Game weather: Sunny, 50 °F (10 °C)
- Game attendance: 78,219
- Referee: Ronald Torbert
- TV announcers (Fox): Joe Davis, Greg Olsen and Pam Oliver
- Recap, Game Book

Game information

**First quarter**

- GB – Davante Adams 17-yard pass from Aaron Rodgers (Mason Crosby kick), 7:11. Packers 7–0. **Drive: 13 plays, 75 yards, 7:49.**
- WAS – Terry McLaurin 40-yard pass from Taylor Heinicke (Chris Blewitt kick), 2:26. Tied 7–7. **Drive: 8 plays, 83 yards, 4:45.**

**Second quarter**

- GB – Allen Lazard 10-yard pass from Aaron Rodgers (Mason Crosby kick), 0:15. Packers 14–7. **Drive: 9 plays, 72 yards, 2:43.**

**Third quarter**

- GB – Robert Tonyan 20-yard pass from Aaron Rodgers (Mason Crosby kick), 12:30. Packers 21–7. **Drive: 3 plays, 27 yards, 1:37.**

**Fourth quarter**

- GB – Mason Crosby 39-yard field goal, 11:22. Packers 24–7. **Drive: 9 plays, 75 yards, 4:43.**
- WAS – Chris Blewitt 34-yard field goal, 2:25. Packers 24–10. **Drive: 6 plays, 11 yards, 3:14.**

**Top passers**

- WAS – Taylor Heinicke – 25/37, 268 yards, TD, INT
- GB – Aaron Rodgers – 27/35, 274 yards, 3 TD

**Top rushers**

- WAS – Taylor Heinicke – 10 rushes, 95 yards
- GB – Aaron Jones – 6 rushes, 19 yards

**Top receivers**

- WAS – Terry McLaurin – 7 receptions, 122 yards, TD
- GB – Davante Adams – 6 receptions, 76 yards, TD

==== Week 8: at Arizona Cardinals ====
Week 8: Green Bay Packers at Arizona Cardinals – Game summary

Quarter	1	2	3	4	Total
**Packers**	0	10	7	7	**24**
Cardinals	7	0	7	7	**21**

at State Farm Stadium, Glendale, Arizona

- Date: October 28
- Game time: 7:20 p.m. CDT/5:20 p.m. MST
- Game weather: Sunny, 86 °F (30 °C) (retractable roof open)
- Game attendance: 63,696
- Referee: Alex Kemp
- TV announcers (Fox/NFLN/Prime Video): Joe Buck, Troy Aikman, Erin Andrews and Kristina Pink
- Recap, Game Book

Game information

**First quarter**

- ARI – Chase Edmonds 11-yard run (Matt Prater kick), 6:17. Cardinals 7–0. **Drive: 7 plays, 63 yards, 3:43.**

**Second quarter**

- GB – Aaron Jones 2-yard run (Mason Crosby kick), 12:54. Tied 7–7. **Drive: 14 plays, 75 yards, 8:23.**
- GB – Mason Crosby 21-yard field goal, 6:24. Packers 10–7. **Drive: 4 plays, 0 yards, 0:19.**

**Third quarter**

- GB – Randall Cobb 2-yard pass from Aaron Rodgers (Mason Crosby kick), 11:37. Packers 17–7. **Drive: 5 plays, 14 yards, 2:16.**
- ARI – James Conner 2-yard run (Matt Prater kick), 6:22. Packers 17–14. **Drive: 12 plays, 81 yards, 5:15.**

**Fourth quarter**

- GB – Randall Cobb 6-yard pass from Aaron Rodgers (Mason Crosby kick), 14:56. Packers 24–14. **Drive: 12 plays, 91 yards, 6:26.**
- ARI – James Conner 9-yard run (Matt Prater kick), 10:45. Packers 24–21. **Drive: 11 plays, 75 yards, 4:11.**

**Top passers**

- GB – Aaron Rodgers – 22/37, 184 yards, 2 TD
- ARI – Kyler Murray – 22/33, 274 yards, 2 INT

**Top rushers**

- GB – A. J. Dillon – 16 rushes, 78 yards
- ARI – Chase Edmonds – 7 rushes, 30 yards, TD

**Top receivers**

- GB – Aaron Jones – 7 receptions, 51 yards
- ARI – DeAndre Hopkins – 2 receptions, 66 yards

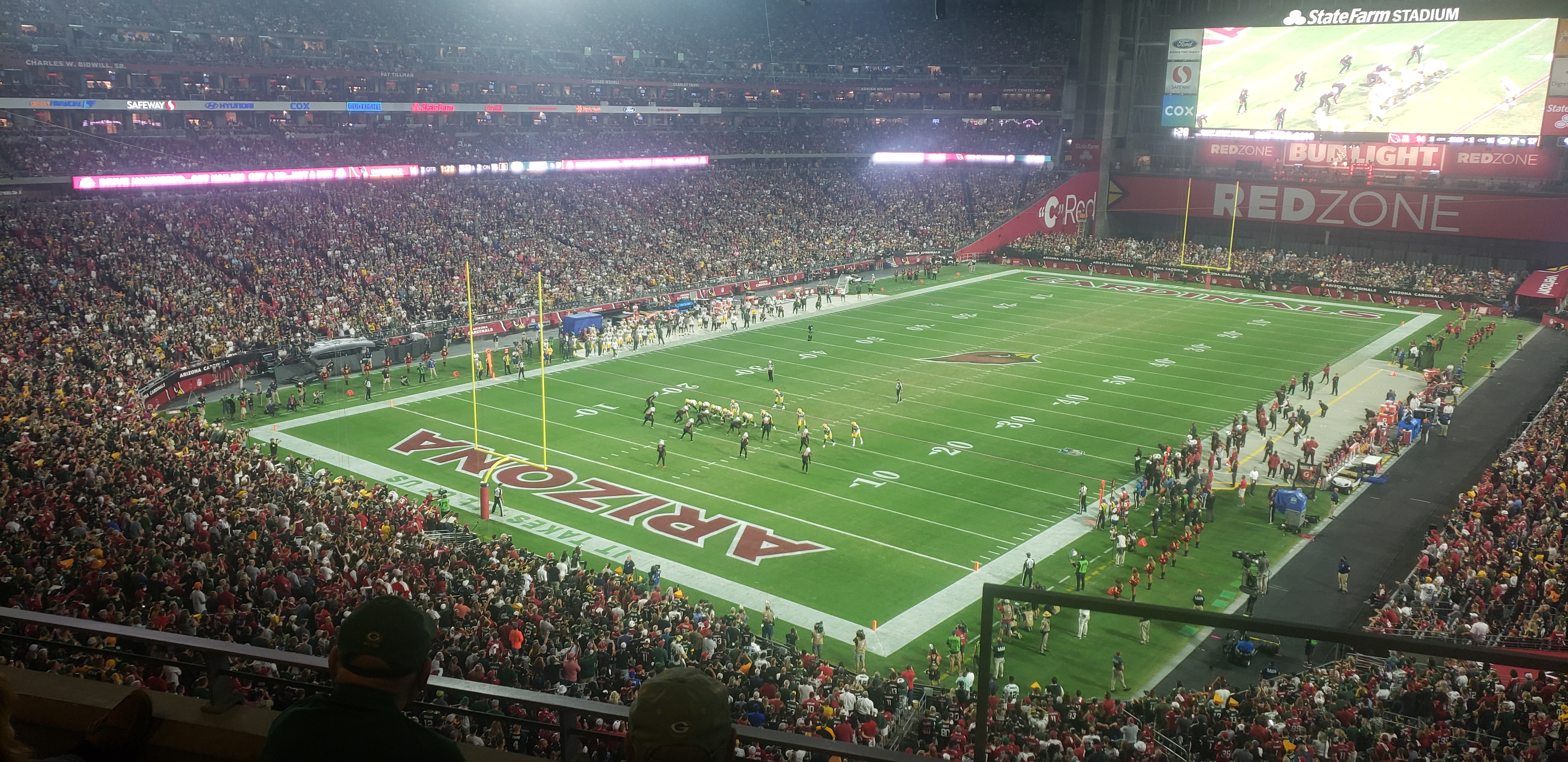
The Packers offense lining up against the Cardinals defense during the game.

The Packers handed the previously undefeated Cardinals their first loss of the season following a game-ending interception by cornerback Rasul Douglas.

==== Week 9: at Kansas City Chiefs ====
Week 9: Green Bay Packers at Kansas City Chiefs – Game summary

Quarter	1	2	3	4	Total
Packers	0	0	0	7	**7**
**Chiefs**	7	6	0	0	**13**

at Arrowhead Stadium, Kansas City, Missouri

- Date: November 7
- Game time: 3:25 p.m. CST
- Game weather: 51 °F (11 °C)
- Game attendance: 73,476
- Referee: Shawn Smith
- TV announcers (Fox): Joe Buck, Troy Aikman, Erin Andrews and Tom Rinaldi
- Recap, Game Book

Game information

**First quarter**

- KC – Travis Kelce 1-yard pass from Patrick Mahomes (Harrison Butker kick), 5:56. Chiefs 7–0. **Drive: 15 plays, 64 yards, 7:55.**

**Second quarter**

- KC – Harrison Butker 24-yard field goal, 1:51. Chiefs 10–0. **Drive: 4 plays, 4 yards, 0:50.**
- KC – Harrison Butker 55-yard field goal, 0:01. Chiefs 13–0. **Drive: 5 plays, 25 yards, 0:26.**

**Third quarter**

- No scoring plays.

**Fourth quarter**

- GB – Allen Lazard 20-yard pass from Jordan Love (Mason Crosby kick), 4:54. Chiefs 13–7. **Drive: 10 plays, 53 yards, 2:57.**

**Top passers**

- GB – Jordan Love – 19/34, 190 yards, TD, INT
- KC – Patrick Mahomes – 20/37, 166 yards, TD

**Top rushers**

- GB – Aaron Jones – 12 rushes, 53 yards
- KC – Darrel Williams – 19 rushes, 70 yards

**Top receivers**

- GB – Randall Cobb – 3 receptions, 50 yards
- KC – Travis Kelce – 5 receptions, 68 yards, TD

This was the Packers' first loss since Week 1 against the Saints, as star QB Aaron Rodgers missed this game due to contracting COVID-19.

==== Week 10: vs. Seattle Seahawks ====
Week 10: Seattle Seahawks at Green Bay Packers – Game summary

Quarter	1	2	3	4	Total
Seahawks	0	0	0	0	**0**
**Packers**	0	3	0	14	**17**

at Lambeau Field, Green Bay, Wisconsin

- Date: November 14
- Game time: 3:25 p.m. CST
- Game weather: Sunny, 35 °F (2 °C)
- Game attendance: 78,235
- Referee: Brad Allen
- TV announcers (CBS): Jim Nantz, Tony Romo, Tracy Wolfson, and Gene Steratore
- Recap, Game Book

Game information

**First quarter**

- No scoring plays

**Second quarter**

- GB – Mason Crosby 27-yard field goal, 9:31. Packers 3–0. **Drive: 14 plays, 82 yards, 6:06.**

**Third quarter**

- No scoring plays

**Fourth quarter**

- GB – A. J. Dillon 3-yard run (Mason Crosby kick), 10:37. Packers 10–0. **Drive: 11 plays, 62 yards, 5:27.**
- GB – A. J. Dillon 2-yard run (Mason Crosby kick), 1:56. Packers 17–0. **Drive: 10 plays, 80 yards, 6:11.**

**Top passers**

- SEA – Russell Wilson – 20/40, 161 yards, 2 INT
- GB – Aaron Rodgers – 23/37, 292 yards, INT

**Top rushers**

- SEA – Alex Collins – 10 rushes, 41 yards
- GB – A. J. Dillon – 21 rushes, 66 yards, 2 TD

**Top receivers**

- SEA – Gerald Everett – 8 receptions, 63 yards
- GB – Davante Adams – 7 receptions, 78 yards

==== Week 11: at Minnesota Vikings ====
Week 11: Green Bay Packers at Minnesota Vikings – Game summary

Quarter	1	2	3	4	Total
Packers	3	7	7	14	**31**
**Vikings**	9	7	7	11	**34**

at U.S. Bank Stadium, Minneapolis, Minnesota

- Date: November 21
- Game time: 12:00 p.m. CST
- Game weather: None (indoor stadium)
- Game attendance: 66,959
- Referee: Shawn Hochuli
- TV announcers (Fox): Kevin Burkhardt, Greg Olsen and Pam Oliver
- Recap, Game Book

Game information

**First quarter**

- GB – Mason Crosby 54-yard field goal, 13:17. Packers 3–0. **Drive: 5 plays, 39 yards, 1:43.**
- MIN – Greg Joseph 51-yard field goal, 9:14. Tied 3–3. **Drive: 7 plays, 42 yards, 4:03.**
- MIN – Dalvin Cook 1-yard run (kick failed), 1:48. Vikings 9–3. **Drive: 6 plays, 84 yards, 3:20.**

**Second quarter**

- MIN – Adam Thielen 10-yard pass from Kirk Cousins (Greg Joseph kick), 7:37. Vikings 16–3. **Drive: 7 plays, 78 yards, 3:38.**
- GB – Josiah Deguara 25-yard pass from Aaron Rodgers (Mason Crosby kick), 0:30. Vikings 16–10. **Drive: 9 plays, 84 yards, 3:48.**

**Third quarter**

- MIN – Justin Jefferson 9-yard pass from Kirk Cousins (Greg Joseph kick), 8:26. Vikings 23–10. **Drive: 14 plays, 75 yards, 6:34.**
- GB – Davante Adams 10-yard pass from Aaron Rodgers (Mason Crosby kick), 3:35. Vikings 23–17. **Drive: 7 plays, 75 yards, 4:51.**

**Fourth quarter**

- GB – Davante Adams 18-yard pass from Aaron Rodgers (Mason Crosby kick), 7:49. Packers 24–23. **Drive: 12 plays, 94 yards, 7:02.**
- MIN – Justin Jefferson 23-yard pass from Kirk Cousins (Dalvin Cook run), 2:17. Vikings 31–24. **Drive: 12 plays, 79 yards, 5:32.**
- GB – Marquez Valdes-Scantling 75-yard pass from Aaron Rodgers (Mason Crosby kick), 2:08. Tied 31–31. **Drive: 1 play, 75 yards, 0:09.**
- MIN – Greg Joseph 29-yard field goal, 0:00. Vikings 34–31. **Drive: 8 plays, 64 yards, 2:08.**

**Top passers**

- GB – Aaron Rodgers – 23/33, 385 yards, 4 TD
- MIN – Kirk Cousins – 24/35, 341 yards, 3 TD

**Top rushers**

- GB – A. J. Dillon – 11 rushes, 53 yards
- MIN – Dalvin Cook – 22 rushes, 86 yards, TD

**Top receivers**

- GB – Marquez Valdes-Scantling – 4 receptions, 123 yards, TD
- MIN – Justin Jefferson – 8 receptions, 169 yards, 2 TD

==== Week 12: vs. Los Angeles Rams ====
Week 12: Los Angeles Rams at Green Bay Packers – Game summary

Quarter	1	2	3	4	Total
Rams	0	17	0	11	**28**
**Packers**	7	13	16	0	**36**

at Lambeau Field, Green Bay, Wisconsin

- Date: November 28
- Game time: 3:25 p.m. CST
- Game weather: Cloudy, 37 °F (3 °C)
- Game attendance: 77,948
- Referee: Craig Wrolstad
- TV announcers (Fox): Joe Buck, Troy Aikman, Erin Andrews and Tom Rinaldi
- Recap, Game Book

Game information

**First quarter**

- GB – Aaron Rodgers 1-yard run (Mason Crosby kick), 2:11. Packers 7–0. **Drive: 3 plays, 6 yards, 1:31.**

**Second quarter**

- GB – Mason Crosby 45-yard field goal, 13:29. Packers 10–0. **Drive: 4 plays, 3 yards, 1:53.**
- LAR – Van Jefferson 79-yard pass from Matthew Stafford (Matt Gay kick), 12:42. Packers 10–7. **Drive: 3 plays, 81 yards, 0:47.**
- GB – Mason Crosby 28-yard field goal, 9:40. Packers 13–7. **Drive: 7 plays, 66 yards, 3:02.**
- LAR – Matt Gay 36-yard field goal, 7:20. Packers 13–10. **Drive: 4 plays, 7 yards, 0:53.**
- GB – Randall Cobb 7-yard pass from Aaron Rodgers (Mason Crosby kick), 4:21. Packers 20–10. **Drive: 6 plays, 89 yards, 2:59.**
- LAR – Darrell Henderson 6-yard pass from Matthew Stafford (Matt Gay kick), 1:28. Packers 20–17. **Drive: 8 plays, 75 yards, 2:53.**

**Third quarter**

- GB – A. J. Dillon 5-yard pass from Aaron Rodgers (Mason Crosby kick), 7:18. Packers 27–17. **Drive: 13 plays, 75 yards, 7:42.**
- GB – Mason Crosby 29-yard field goal, 2:28. Packers 30–17. **Drive: 6 plays, 16 yards, 2:19.**
- GB – Rasul Douglas 33-yard interception return (pass failed), 1:52. Packers 36–17.

**Fourth quarter**

- LAR – Odell Beckham Jr. 54-yard pass from Matthew Stafford (Matthew Stafford-Cooper Kupp pass), 14:52. Packers 36–25. **Drive: 7 plays, 80 yards, 2:00.**
- LAR – Matt Gay 39-yard field goal, 0:18. Packers 36–28. **Drive: 11 plays, 47 yards, 2:47.**

**Top passers**

- LAR – Matthew Stafford – 21/38, 302 yards, 3 TD, INT
- GB – Aaron Rodgers – 28/45, 307 yards, 2 TD

**Top rushers**

- LAR – Darrell Henderson – 16 rushes, 55 yards
- GB – A. J. Dillon – 20 rushes, 69 yards

**Top receivers**

- LAR – Cooper Kupp – 7 receptions, 96 yards
- GB – Davante Adams – 8 receptions, 104 yards

The Packers held off the Rams in their home in Lambeau Field. After the Rams would score to make it 20 - 17, the Packers would take a lead they would never surrender, scoring 16 unanswered points in the process to improve to 9 - 3.

==== Week 14: vs. Chicago Bears ====
Week 14: Chicago Bears at Green Bay Packers – Game summary

Quarter	1	2	3	4	Total
Bears	3	24	0	3	**30**
**Packers**	0	21	17	7	**45**

at Lambeau Field, Green Bay, Wisconsin

- Date: December 12
- Game time: 7:20 p.m. CST
- Game weather: Cloudy, 37 °F (3 °C)
- Game attendance: 78,273
- Referee: Ronald Torbert
- TV announcers (NBC): Al Michaels, Cris Collinsworth, Kathryn Tappen and Terry McAulay
- Recap, Game Book

Game information

**First quarter**

- CHI – Cairo Santos 23-yard field goal, 4:21. Bears 3–0. **Drive: 10 plays, 39 yards, 4:47.**

**Second quarter**

- CHI – Jakeem Grant 46-yard pass from Justin Fields (Cairo Santos kick), 11:09. Bears 10–0. **Drive: 6 plays, 89 yards, 3:41.**
- GB – Allen Lazard 2-yard pass from Aaron Rodgers (Mason Crosby kick), 6:02. Bears 10–7. **Drive: 11 plays, 75 yards, 5:07.**
- GB – Rasul Douglas 55-yard interception return (Mason Crosby kick), 4:59. Packers 14–10.
- CHI – Damiere Byrd 54-yard pass from Justin Fields (Cairo Santos kick), 3:21. Bears 17–14. **Drive: 3 plays, 60 yards, 1:38.**
- CHI – Jakeem Grant 97-yard punt return (Cairo Santos kick), 1:32. Bears 24–14.
- GB – Davante Adams 38-yard pass from Aaron Rodgers (Mason Crosby kick), 0:44. Bears 24–21. **Drive: 4 plays, 75 yards, 0:48.**
- CHI – Cairo Santos 44-yard field goal, 0:00. Bears 27–21. **Drive: 6 plays, 32 yards, 0:44.**

**Third quarter**

- GB – Aaron Jones 3-yard run (Mason Crosby kick), 9:24. Packers 28–27. **Drive: 9 plays, 75 yards, 5:36.**
- GB – Aaron Jones 23-yard pass from Aaron Rodgers (Mason Crosby kick), 8:24. Packers 35–27. **Drive: 1 play, 23 yards, 0:08.**
- GB – Mason Crosby 20-yard field goal, 2:52. Packers 38–27. **Drive: 7 plays, 46 yards, 3:45.**

**Fourth quarter**

- GB – Davante Adams 3-yard pass from Aaron Rodgers (Mason Crosby kick), 4:33. Packers 45–27. **Drive: 13 plays, 71 yards, 8:38.**
- CHI – Cairo Santos 43-yard field goal, 1:22. Packers 45–30. **Drive: 10 plays, 54 yards, 3:11.**

**Top passers**

- CHI – Justin Fields – 18/33, 224 yards, 2 TD, 2 INT
- GB – Aaron Rodgers – 29/37, 341 yards, 4 TD

**Top rushers**

- CHI – Justin Fields – 9 rushes, 74 yards
- GB – A. J. Dillon – 15 rushes, 71 yards

**Top receivers**

- CHI – Damiere Byrd – 2 receptions, 76 yards, TD
- GB – Davante Adams – 10 receptions, 121 yards, 2 TD

==== Week 15: at Baltimore Ravens ====
Week 15: Green Bay Packers at Baltimore Ravens – Game summary

Quarter	1	2	3	4	Total
**Packers**	0	14	7	10	**31**
Ravens	7	7	3	13	**30**

at M&T Bank Stadium, Baltimore, Maryland

- Date: December 19
- Game time: 4:25 p.m. EST/3:25 p.m. CST
- Game weather: Sunny, 43 °F (6 °C)
- Game attendance: 70,815
- Referee: Brad Allen
- TV announcers (Fox): Joe Buck, Troy Aikman, Erin Andrews and Tom Rinaldi
- Recap, Game Book

Game information

**First quarter**

- BAL – Mark Andrews 8-yard pass from Tyler Huntley (Justin Tucker kick), 2:33. Ravens 7–0. **Drive: 7 plays, 45 yards, 3:32.**

**Second quarter**

- GB – A. J. Dillon 2-yard run (Mason Crosby kick), 12:50. Tied 7–7. **Drive: 8 plays, 84 yards, 4:43.**
- BAL – Mark Andrews 9-yard pass from Tyler Huntley (Justin Tucker kick), 7:11. Ravens 14–7. **Drive: 11 plays, 73 yards, 5:39.**
- GB – Davante Adams 3-yard pass from Aaron Rodgers (Mason Crosby kick), 1:09. Tied 14–14. **Drive: 11 plays, 77 yards, 6:02.**

**Third quarter**

- GB – Aaron Jones 9-yard pass from Aaron Rodgers (Mason Crosby kick), 7:40. Packers 21–14. **Drive: 13 plays, 80 yards, 7:20.**
- BAL – Justin Tucker 38-yard field goal, 3:20. Packers 21–17. **Drive: 9 plays, 55 yards, 4:20.**

**Fourth quarter**

- GB – Marquez Valdes-Scantling 11-yard pass from Aaron Rodgers (Mason Crosby kick), 12:54. Packers 28–17. **Drive: 11 plays, 88 yards, 5:26.**
- GB – Mason Crosby 29-yard field goal, 9:26. Packers 31–17. **Drive: 5 plays, 18 yards, 2:30.**
- BAL – Tyler Huntley 3-yard run (Justin Tucker kick), 4:47. Packers 31–24. **Drive: 12 plays, 75 yards, 4:39.**
- BAL – Tyler Huntley 8-yard run (pass failed), 0:42. Packers 31–30. **Drive: 7 plays, 49 yards, 1:42.**

**Top passers**

- GB – Aaron Rodgers – 23/31, 268 yards, 3 TD
- BAL – Tyler Huntley – 28/40, 215 yards, 2 TD

**Top rushers**

- GB – Aaron Jones – 14 rushes, 58 yards
- BAL – Tyler Huntley – 13 rushes, 73 yards, 2 TD

**Top receivers**

- GB – Marquez Valdes-Scantling – 5 receptions, 98 yards, TD
- BAL – Mark Andrews – 10 receptions, 136 yards, 2 TD

==== Week 16: vs. Cleveland Browns ====
Christmas Day game

Week 16: Cleveland Browns at Green Bay Packers – Game summary

Quarter	1	2	3	4	Total
Browns	6	6	3	7	**22**
**Packers**	7	14	3	0	**24**

at Lambeau Field, Green Bay, Wisconsin

- Date: December 25
- Game time: 3:30 p.m. CST
- Game weather: Cloudy, 35 °F (2 °C)
- Game attendance: 77,901
- Referee: Alex Kemp
- TV announcers (Fox/NFLN/Prime Video): Joe Buck, Troy Aikman, Erin Andrews and Tom Rinaldi
- Recap, Game Book

Game information

**First quarter**

- CLE – Nick Chubb 1-yard run (kick failed), 12:21. Browns 6–0. **Drive: 5 plays, 75 yards, 2:39.**
- GB – Allen Lazard 11-yard pass from Aaron Rodgers (Mason Crosby kick), 5:13. Packers 7–6. **Drive: 5 plays, 53 yards, 3:24.**

**Second quarter**

- GB – Davante Adams 9-yard pass from Aaron Rodgers (Mason Crosby kick), 10:47. Packers 14–6. **Drive: 10 plays, 78 yards, 4:48.**
- CLE – Harrison Bryant 1-yard pass from Baker Mayfield (pass failed), 7:03. Packers 14–12. **Drive: 6 plays, 70 yards, 3:44.**
- GB – Davante Adams 1-yard pass from Aaron Rodgers (Mason Crosby kick), 0:12. Packers 21–12. **Drive: 9 plays, 49 yards, 1:39.**

**Third quarter**

- GB – Mason Crosby 32-yard field goal, 9:12. Packers 24–12. **Drive: 11 plays, 76 yards, 5:48.**
- CLE – Chris Naggar 37-yard field goal, 1:07. Packers 24–15. **Drive: 14 plays, 66 yards, 8:05.**

**Fourth quarter**

- CLE – Anthony Schwartz 5-yard pass from Baker Mayfield (Chris Naggar kick), 4:31. Packers 24–22. **Drive: 8 plays, 76 yards, 2:10.**

**Top passers**

- CLE – Baker Mayfield – 21/36, 222 yards, 2 TD, 4 INT
- GB – Aaron Rodgers – 24/34, 202 yards, 3 TD

**Top rushers**

- CLE – Nick Chubb – 17 rushes, 126 yards, TD
- GB – Aaron Jones – 12 rushes, 66 yards

**Top receivers**

- CLE – Rashard Higgins – 5 receptions, 58 yards
- GB – Davante Adams – 10 receptions, 114 yards, 2 TD

Aaron Rodgers surpassed Brett Favre with his 443rd touchdown pass to Allen Lazard.

==== Week 17: vs. Minnesota Vikings ====
Week 17: Minnesota Vikings at Green Bay Packers – Game summary

Quarter	1	2	3	4	Total
Vikings	0	3	7	0	**10**
**Packers**	3	17	10	7	**37**

at Lambeau Field, Green Bay, Wisconsin

- Date: January 2
- Game time: 7:20 p.m. CST
- Game weather: Clear, 11 °F (−12 °C)
- Game attendance: 77,832
- Referee: Clay Martin
- TV announcers (NBC): Mike Tirico, Cris Collinsworth, Kathryn Tappen and Terry McAulay
- Recap, Game Book

Game information

**First quarter**

- GB – Mason Crosby 35-yard field goal, 11:48. Packers 3–0. **Drive: 9 plays, 58 yards, 3:12.**

**Second quarter**

- GB – Mason Crosby 36-yard field goal, 9:11. Packers 6–0. **Drive: 8 plays, 61 yards, 4:18.**
- GB – Allen Lazard 20-yard pass from Aaron Rodgers (Mason Crosby kick), 4:11. Packers 13–0. **Drive: 6 plays, 66 yards, 3:21.**
- GB – Davante Adams 11-yard pass from Aaron Rodgers (Mason Crosby kick), 1:05. Packers 20–0. **Drive: 6 plays, 64 yards, 1:03.**
- MIN – Greg Joseph 51-yard field goal, 0:00. Packers 20–3. **Drive: 9 plays, 42 yards, 1:05.**

**Third quarter**

- GB – A. J. Dillon 4-yard run (Mason Crosby kick), 9:28. Packers 27–3. **Drive: 7 plays, 37 yards, 3:51.**
- GB – Mason Crosby 37-yard field goal, 3:22. Packers 30–3. **Drive: 8 plays, 32 yards, 3:48.**
- MIN – K. J. Osborn 14-yard pass from Sean Mannion (Greg Joseph kick), 0:00. Packers 30–10. **Drive: 8 plays, 65 yards, 3:22.**

**Fourth quarter**

- GB – A. J. Dillon 7-yard run (Mason Crosby kick), 8:41. Packers 37–10. **Drive: 11 plays, 70 yards, 6:19.**

**Top passers**

- MIN – Sean Mannion – 22/36, 189 yards, TD
- GB – Aaron Rodgers – 29/38, 288 yards, 2 TD

**Top rushers**

- MIN – Sean Mannion – 2 rushes, 14 yards
- GB – Aaron Jones – 8 rushes, 76 yards

**Top receivers**

- MIN – Justin Jefferson – 6 receptions, 58 yards
- GB – Davante Adams – 11 receptions, 136 yards, TD

The game was the coldest of the NFL season, with a game-time temperature of 11 degrees Fahrenheit, and a wind chill of 1 degree Fahrenheit. With the win, Green Bay clinched the #1 seed in the NFC for the second straight year, and their 3rd straight 13-win season.

==== Week 18: at Detroit Lions ====
Week 18: Green Bay Packers at Detroit Lions – Game summary

Quarter	1	2	3	4	Total
Packers	7	6	3	14	**30**
**Lions**	7	10	7	13	**37**

at Ford Field, Detroit, Michigan

- Date: January 9
- Game time: 1:00 p.m. EST/12:00 p.m. CST
- Game weather: None (indoor stadium)
- Game attendance: 56,735
- Referee: Scott Novak
- TV announcers (Fox): Kevin Burkhardt, Greg Olsen and Pam Oliver
- Recap, Game Book

Game information

**First quarter**

- GB – Allen Lazard 1-yard pass from Aaron Rodgers (Mason Crosby kick), 7:42. Packers 7–0. **Drive: 13 plays, 74 yards, 7:18.**
- DET – Kalif Raymond 75-yard pass from Tom Kennedy (Riley Patterson kick), 1:29. Tied 7–7. **Drive: 3 plays, 93 yards, 1:28.**

**Second quarter**

- DET – Amon-Ra St. Brown 2-yard pass from Jared Goff (Riley Patterson kick), 7:00. Lions 14–7. **Drive: 10 plays, 57 yards, 5:44.**
- GB – Allen Lazard 1-yard pass from Aaron Rodgers (kick failed), 2:34. Lions 14–13. **Drive: 7 plays, 75 yards, 4:26.**
- DET – Riley Patterson 34-yard field goal, 0:02. Lions 17–13. **Drive: 10 plays, 59 yards, 2:32.**

**Third quarter**

- DET – Brock Wright 36-yard pass from Jared Goff (Riley Patterson kick), 12:50. Lions 24–13. **Drive: 1 play, 36 yards, 0:09.**
- GB – Mason Crosby 36-yard field goal, 7:38. Lions 24–16. **Drive: 11 plays, 58 yards, 5:12.**

**Fourth quarter**

- GB – Patrick Taylor 1-yard run (two-point conversion failed), 14:12. Lions 24–22. **Drive: 12 plays, 57 yards, 6:53.**
- DET – Riley Patterson 36-yard field goal, 6:39. Lions 27–22. **Drive: 14 plays, 57 yards, 7:33.**
- GB – Josiah Deguara 62-yard pass from Jordan Love (Jordan Love run), 4:49. Packers 30–27. **Drive: 4 plays, 75 yards, 1:50.**
- DET – D'Andre Swift 14-yard run (Riley Patterson kick), 1:54. Lions 34–30. **Drive: 6 plays, 75 yards, 2:55.**
- DET – Riley Patterson 27-yard field goal, 0:48. Lions 37–30. **Drive: 4 plays, 6 yards, 0:25.**

**Top passers**

- DET – Jared Goff – 21/30, 238 yards, 2 TD
- GB – Aaron Rodgers – 14/18, 138 yards, 2 TD

**Top rushers**

- DET – Jamaal Williams – 13 rushes, 43 yards
- GB – A. J. Dillon – 14 rushes, 63 yards

**Top receivers**

- DET – Amon-Ra St. Brown – 8 receptions, 109 yards, TD
- GB – Davante Adams – 6 receptions, 55 yards

=== Standings ===
==== Division ====
NFC North
	W	L	T	PCT	DIV	CONF	PF	PA	STK
^{(1)} Green Bay Packers	13	4	0	.765	4–2	9–3	450	371	L1
Minnesota Vikings	8	9	0	.471	4–2	6–6	425	426	W1
Chicago Bears	6	11	0	.353	2–4	4–8	311	407	L1
Detroit Lions	3	13	1	.206	2–4	3–9	325	467	W1

==== Conference ====
NFC
#	Team	Division	W	L	T	PCT	DIV	CONF	SOS	SOV	STK
**Division winners**
1 (Note: Green Bay finished ahead of Tampa Bay based on conference record (9–3 vs. 8–4), claiming the No. 1 seed.)	Green Bay Packers	North	13	4	0	.765	4–2	9–3	.479	.480	L1
2	Tampa Bay Buccaneers	South	13	4	0	.765	4–2	8–4	.467	.443	W3
3 (Note: Dallas claimed the No. 3 seed over LA Rams based on conference record (10–2 vs. 8–4).)	Dallas Cowboys	East	12	5	0	.706	6–0	10–2	.488	.431	W1
4	Los Angeles Rams	West	12	5	0	.706	3–3	8–4	.483	.409	L1
**Wild cards**
5	Arizona Cardinals	West	11	6	0	.647	4–2	7–5	.490	.492	L1
6	San Francisco 49ers	West	10	7	0	.588	2–4	7–5	.500	.438	W2
7 (Note: Philadelphia finished ahead of New Orleans based on head-to-head victory, claiming the 7th and final playoff spot.)	Philadelphia Eagles	East	9	8	0	.529	3–3	7–5	.469	.350	L1
**Did not qualify for the postseason**
8	New Orleans Saints	South	9	8	0	.529	4–2	7–5	.512	.516	W2
9	Minnesota Vikings	North	8	9	0	.471	4–2	6–6	.507	.434	W1
10 (Note: Washington finished ahead of Atlanta and Seattle based on head-to-head victories.)	Washington Football Team	East	7	10	0	.412	2–4	6–6	.529	.420	W1
11 (Note: Seattle finished ahead of Atlanta based on win percentage in common games (4–2 vs. 3–3 against: San Francisco, New Orleans, Jacksonville, Washington, and Detroit).)	Seattle Seahawks	West	7	10	0	.412	3–3	4–8	.519	.424	W2
12	Atlanta Falcons	South	7	10	0	.412	2–4	4–8	.472	.315	L2
13	Chicago Bears	North	6	11	0	.353	2–4	4–8	.524	.373	L1
14	Carolina Panthers	South	5	12	0	.294	2–4	3–9	.509	.412	L7
15	New York Giants	East	4	13	0	.235	1–5	3–9	.536	.485	L6
16	Detroit Lions	North	3	13	1	.206	2–4	3–9	.528	.627	W1
**Tiebreakers** (Note: When breaking ties for three or more teams under the NFL's rules, they are first broken within divisions, then comparing only the highest-ranked remaining team from each division.)

== Postseason ==
As the result of clinching the NFC North division title and the best record in the NFC, the Packers hosted a playoff game in the Divisional round. Despite hoisting the number 1 seed in the NFC, the Packers lost to the 49ers in the divisional round due to several special teams blunders during the game. Prior to the postseason, the special teams unit was scrutinized during the 2021 season as they were ranked 32nd in DVOA by Football Outsiders.

Round	Date	Opponent (seed)	Result	Record	Venue	Recap
Wild Card	First-round bye					
Divisional	January 22	San Francisco 49ers (6)	L 10–13	0–1	Lambeau Field	Recap

=== Game summaries ===
==== NFC Divisional Playoffs: vs. (6) San Francisco 49ers ====
NFC Divisional Playoffs: (6) San Francisco 49ers at (1) Green Bay Packers – Game summary

Quarter	1	2	3	4	Total
49ers	0	0	3	10	13
Packers	7	0	0	3	10

at Lambeau Field, Green Bay, Wisconsin

- Date: January 22, 2022
- Game time: 7:15 p.m. CST
- Game weather: Cloudy, 14 °F (−10 °C)
- Game attendance: 79,132
- Referee: Ronald Torbert
- TV announcers (Fox): Joe Buck, Troy Aikman, Erin Andrews and Tom Rinaldi
- Recap, Game Book

Game information

First quarter

- GB – A. J. Dillon 6-yard run (Mason Crosby kick), 9:25. Packers 7–0. Drive: 10 plays, 69 yards, 5:35.

Second quarter

- No scoring plays

Third quarter

- SF – Robbie Gould 29-yard field goal, 8:13. Packers 7–3. Drive: 10 plays, 39 yards, 6:47.

Fourth quarter

- GB – Mason Crosby 33-yard field goal, 11:27. Packers 10–3. Drive: 14 plays, 57 yards, 9:01.
- SF – Talanoa Hufanga 6-yard blocked punt return (Robbie Gould kick), 4:41. Tied 10–10.
- SF – Robbie Gould 45-yard field goal, 0:00. 49ers 13–10. Drive: 9 plays, 44 yards, 3:20.

Top passers

- SF – Jimmy Garoppolo – 11/19, 131 yards, INT
- GB – Aaron Rodgers – 20/29, 225 yards

Top rushers

- SF – Elijah Mitchell – 17 rushes, 53 yards
- GB – Aaron Jones – 12 rushes, 41 yards

Top receivers

- SF – George Kittle – 4 receptions, 63 yards
- GB – Aaron Jones – 9 receptions, 129 yards

Despite leading 7–0 and 7–3 throughout most of the game, the Packers went on to lose 13–10 to the 49ers. During the game, the special teams received scrutiny after allowing a blocked field goal, a 32-yard kick return by JaMycal Hasty, a 45-yard return by Deebo Samuel, and blocked punt that would tie the game at 10–10 in the 4th quarter. Prior to the game, the special teams was scrutinized during the entire season as they were ranked 32nd in the NFL DVOA by Football Outsiders.

== Statistics ==
=== Starters ===
==== Regular season ====
Offense

Pos.	Name	GS
QB	Aaron Rodgers; Jordan Love	16; 1
RB	Aaron Jones; A. J. Dillon	15; 2
WR	Davante Adams; Randall Cobb	16; 3
WR2	Allen Lazard; Amari Rodgers	13; 1
WR3	Marquez Valdes-Scantling; Equanimeous St. Brown	7; 2
TE	Marcedes Lewis	17
TE2	Robert Tonyan; Dominique Dafney; Josiah Deguara	5; 2; 2
LT	Elgton Jenkins; Yosh Nijman; David Bakhtiari	8; 8; 1
LG	Lucas Patrick; Jon Runyan Jr.	1; 16
C	Josh Myers; Lucas Patrick	6; 11
RG	Royce Newman; Lucas Patrick	16; 1
RT	Billy Turner; Dennis Kelly	13; 4

Defense

Pos.	Name	GS
NT	Kenny Clark	16
DE	Kingsley Keke; Tyler Lancaster	8; 3
DE	Dean Lowry	17
OLB	Rashan Gary; Jonathan Garvin	16; 1
OLB	Preston Smith	16
ILB	De'Vondre Campbell	16
ILB	Krys Barnes; Oren Burks	13; 3
CB	Jaire Alexander; Rasul Douglas	4; 9
CB	Kevin King; Eric Stokes; Chandon Sullivan; Isaac Yiadom	6; 14; 10; 1
S	Adrian Amos	17
S	Darnell Savage	17

==== Postseason ====
Offense

Pos.	Name	GS
QB	Aaron Rodgers	1
RB	Aaron Jones	1
WR	Davante Adams	1
WR2	Allen Lazard	1
WR3	Equanimeous St. Brown	1
TE	Marcedes Lewis	1
LT	Billy Turner	1
LG	Jon Runyan Jr.	1
C	Josh Myers	1
RG	Lucas Patrick	1
RT	Dennis Kelly	1

Defense

Pos.	Name	GS
NT	Kenny Clark	1
DE	Tyler Lancaster	1
DE	Dean Lowry	1
OLB	Rashan Gary	1
OLB	Preston Smith	1
ILB	De'Vondre Campbell	1
ILB	Krys Barnes	1
CB	Rasul Douglas	1
CB	Eric Stokes	1
S	Adrian Amos	1
S	Darnell Savage	1

=== Team leaders ===
Category	Player(s)	Value
Passing yards	Aaron Rodgers	4115
Passing touchdowns	Aaron Rodgers	37
Rushing yards	A. J. Dillon	803
Rushing touchdowns	A. J. Dillon	5
Receptions	Davante Adams	123
Receiving yards	Davante Adams	1553
Receiving touchdowns	Davante Adams	11
Kickoff return yards	Kylin Hill; Amari Rodgers	199
Punt return yards	Amari Rodgers	166
Tackles	De'Vondre Campbell	146
Sacks	Rashan Gary	9.5
Interceptions	Rasul Douglas	5

=== League rankings ===
Category	Total yards	Yards per game	NFL rank (out of 32)
Passing offense	4315	253.8	9th
Rushing offense	1900	111.8	18th
Total offense	6215	365.6	10th
Passing defense	3724	219.1	10th
Rushing defense	1855	109.1	11th
Total defense	5579	328.2	9th

Statistical values are correct as of Week 18

== Awards ==
Recipient	Award(s)
Davante Adams	Pro Bowler; All-Pro Team
De'Vondre Campbell	October: NFC Defensive Player of the Month; All-Pro Team
Kenny Clark	Pro Bowler
Mason Crosby	Week 3: NFC Special Teams Player of the Week
Rasul Douglas	Week 12: NFC Defensive Player of the Week
Aaron Rodgers	Week 15: NFC Offensive Player of the Week; Pro Bowler; December: NFC Offensive Player of the Month; All-Pro Team; Most Valuable Player
