= Joe Fortunato =

Joe Fortunato may refer to:

- Joe Fortunato (coach) (1918–2004), American college sports coach and administrator
- Joe Fortunato (ice hockey) (born 1955), Canadian former ice hockey player
- Joe Fortunato (linebacker) (1930–2017), American football linebacker
- Joe Fortunato (long snapper) (born 1994), American football long snapper
