= Abdullah Anderson =

American football player (born 1996)

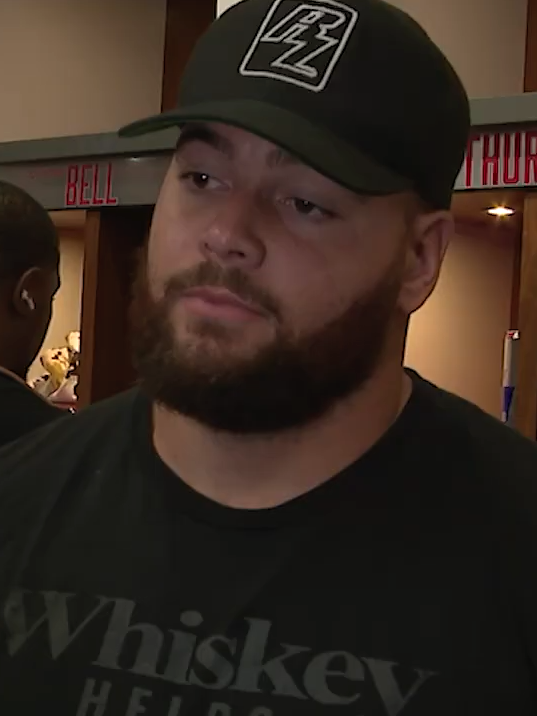
- Anderson in 2022

Profile
- Position: Defensive end

Personal information
- Born: January 24, 1996 (age 30); Atlantic City, New Jersey, U.S.
- Listed height: 6 ft 4 in (1.93 m)
- Listed weight: 295 lb (134 kg)

Career information
- High school: Absegami (Galloway Township, New Jersey)
- College: Bucknell (2014–2017)
- NFL draft: 2018: undrafted

Career history
- Chicago Bears (2018–2020); Minnesota Vikings (2020); Pittsburgh Steelers (2021)*; Green Bay Packers (2021)*; Tennessee Titans (2021)*; Green Bay Packers (2021); Atlanta Falcons (2022); Washington Commanders (2023); Tennessee Titans (2024)
- * Offseason or practice squad member only

Awards and highlights
- Patriot League Defensive Player of the Year (2017); FCS Collegiate Player of the Year (2017); 3× First-team All-Patriot League (2015–2017); Second-team FCS All-American (2017)

Career NFL statistics as of 2024
- Tackles: 54
- Sacks: 2.5
- Fumble recoveries: 1
- Pass deflections: 1
- Stats at Pro Football Reference

Abdullah Anderson Jr. (born January 24, 1996) is an American professional football defensive end. He played college football for the Bucknell Bison. Anderson signed with the Chicago Bears as an undrafted free agent in 2018 and spent three seasons with them before playing with several other NFL teams.

== Early life ==
Anderson was born in Atlantic City, New Jersey, on January 24, 1996. He grew up in nearby Galloway Township and attended Absegami High School. He is the only son of Abdullah Anderson Sr. and Octavia Anderson. Anderson has one older sister, Amira. Anderson, who had played youth football, decided for his senior year it was time to tell Braves coach Dennis Scuderi Jr. that he might like to finish out his prep career with one season of football. Anderson went on to have a good enough season to catch the eye of Bucknell University coach Joe Susan. Quite a turn of events for a kid who thought he was going to play college basketball. Anderson disciplined his body and weight and went from 235 as a senior in high school to 300 pounds in his college career.

== College career ==
Anderson attended Bucknell, where he majored in economics. As a freshman, he started all 11 games at defensive tackle; he was one of five defensive players to start every game and the only freshman on team to do so.

During his second year in 2015, Anderson was one of six defensive players to start all 11 games and one of three defensive linemen to start every game. He totaled 46 tackles, eight tackles for loss, 4.5 sacks and three pass breakups from defensive tackle position. He ranked seventh on team in tackles and fifth on squad in tackles for loss.

In his junior season, Anderson started all 11 games on the defensive line for a third straight year. He ranked fourth on team with 55 tackles, 13.5 tackles for loss, five pass breakups and two blocked kicks. Anderson ranked second in the Patriot League in tackles for loss and ranked third in Patriot League in sacks. He was named Patriot League Defensive Player of the Week on November 21 after totaling five tackles, 3.5 tackles for loss, 2.5 sacks, one pass breakup and two blocked field goals against Fordham.

During his senior year in 2017, Anderson recorded 42 tackles, nine tackles for loss, 2.5 sacks, two fumble recoveries, an interception, and blocked an extra point. In addition to being named All-Patriot League for the fourth time, he was named the 2017 Patriot League Defensive Player of the Year and NCAA FCS Collegiate Player of the Year by the Brooks-Irvine Memorial Football Club. He was also named second-team All-American by the Associated Press.

Anderson ended his college career with 43 starts in which he had 171 tackles, 33.5 tackles for loss, 15.5 sacks, and a school-record four blocked kicks.

== Professional career ==
Pre-draft measurables
Height	Weight	Arm length	Hand span	40-yard dash	10-yard split	20-yard split	20-yard shuttle	Three-cone drill	Vertical jump	Broad jump	Bench press
6 ft 3 1/4 in (1.91 m)	303 lb (137 kg)	32 5/8 in (0.83 m)	10 3/8 in (0.26 m)	5.12 s	1.75 s	2.89 s	4.68 s	7.38 s	30.0 in (0.76 m)	8 ft 10 in (2.69 m)	32 reps
All values from Pro Day

=== Chicago Bears ===
Before the 2018 NFL draft, Anderson participated in private workouts with the San Francisco 49ers and Seattle Seahawks. After not being selected in the draft, he signed with the Chicago Bears as an undrafted free agent. He was released during final roster cuts and signed to the team's practice squad. He remained with the team for the 2019 offseason after signing a future/reserve contract.

Anderson made the 2019 Bears' final roster and played in his maiden NFL game in the season opener against the Green Bay Packers. He was waived on September 11 and moved to the practice squad to make room for tight end J. P. Holtz, but was promoted to the active roster on September 23 to increase defensive line depth following Bilal Nichols' injury. He was waived on September 30 and re-signed to the team's practice squad on October 1. He was promoted to the 53-man roster again on October 14 after Kyle Long was placed on injured reserve.

In the third quarter of the Bears' 36–25 loss to the New Orleans Saints on October 20, 2019, Anderson recorded his first career NFL sack on Teddy Bridgewater. In addition to his sack, Anderson had a tackle for loss and two total tackles.

Anderson was among the final roster cuts on September 5, 2020, before being placed on the practice squad a day later. He was released on September 14.

=== Minnesota Vikings ===
On September 21, 2020, Anderson was signed to the Minnesota Vikings' practice squad. He was elevated to the active roster on November 7 for the team's week 9 game against the Detroit Lions, and reverted to the practice squad after the game. His practice squad contract with the team expired after the season on January 11, 2021.

=== Pittsburgh Steelers ===
Anderson signed with the Pittsburgh Steelers on April 12, 2021. He was waived on August 17, 2021.

=== Green Bay Packers (first stint) ===
On August 25, 2021, Anderson signed with the Packers. On August 31, 2021, Packers released Anderson as part of their final roster cuts. He was signed to the practice squad the next day. He was released on September 21, 2021.

=== Tennessee Titans (first stint) ===
On September 29, 2021, Anderson was signed to the Tennessee Titans practice squad. He was released on October 26.

=== Green Bay Packers (second stint) ===
On November 2, 2021, Anderson was signed to the Packers practice squad. He was elevated to the active roster on December 18 ahead of a week 15 game against Baltimore Ravens. He was elevated to the active roster again on January 1, 2022, ahead of a Week 17 game against the Vikings. He was elevated to the active roster the third time on January 8, 2022, ahead of a Week 18 game against the Detroit Lions.

=== Atlanta Falcons ===
On August 7, 2022, Anderson signed with the Atlanta Falcons. On September 1, 2022, Anderson was signed to the 53 man roster for the Falcons. The Falcons released Anderson on September 10, 2022, a day before the start of the 2022 season. He was signed to the practice squad two days later. He was promoted to the active roster on September 19. Anderson found a more permanent home with the Falcons, playing in 16 games.

=== Washington Commanders ===
Anderson signed with the Washington Commanders on March 17, 2023. He was released on August 29, 2023, but re-signed two days later. On October 14, he was released again and signed to the practice squad two days later. He played seven games during the 2023 season, making eight tackles and a fumble recovery.

=== Tennessee Titans (second stint) ===
On August 16, 2024, Anderson signed with the Tennessee Titans. He was released on August 27, and re-signed to the practice squad. He was promoted to the active roster on October 19. He was waived on October 28, and re-signed to the practice squad. He played four games during the 2024 season.

Anderson signed a reserve/future contract with Tennessee on January 6, 2025. On May 13, Anderson was released by the Titans.

== Career NFL statistics ==
=== Regular season ===
Year	Team	Games		Tackles					Interceptions						Fumbles			
Year	Team	GP	GS	Tkl	Ast	Comb	Solo	Sack	Int	Yards	Avg	Lng	TD	PD	FF	FR	Yards	TD
2019	CHI	6	0	3	1	4	3	1	0	0	0.0	0	0	0	0	0	0	0
2020	MIN	1	0	0	0	0	0	0	0	0	0.0	0	0	0	0	0	0	0
2021	GB	3	0	1	1	2	1	0	0	0	0.0	0	0	0	0	0	0	0
2022	ATL	16	8	15	25	40	12	1	0	0	0.0	0	0	1	0	0	0	0
2023	WASH	7	0	5	3	8	4	.5	0	0	0.0	0	0	0	0	1	0	0
2024	TEN	4	0	0	0	0	0	0	0	0	0.0	0	0	0	0	0	0	0
Career		37	8	24	30	54	20	2.5	0	0	0.0	0	0	1	0	1	0	0
Source: NFL.com

== Personal life ==
Abdullah Anderson's cousin Austin Johnson plays currently for the Jacksonville Jaguars.
