= Adrian Amos =

American football player (born 1993)

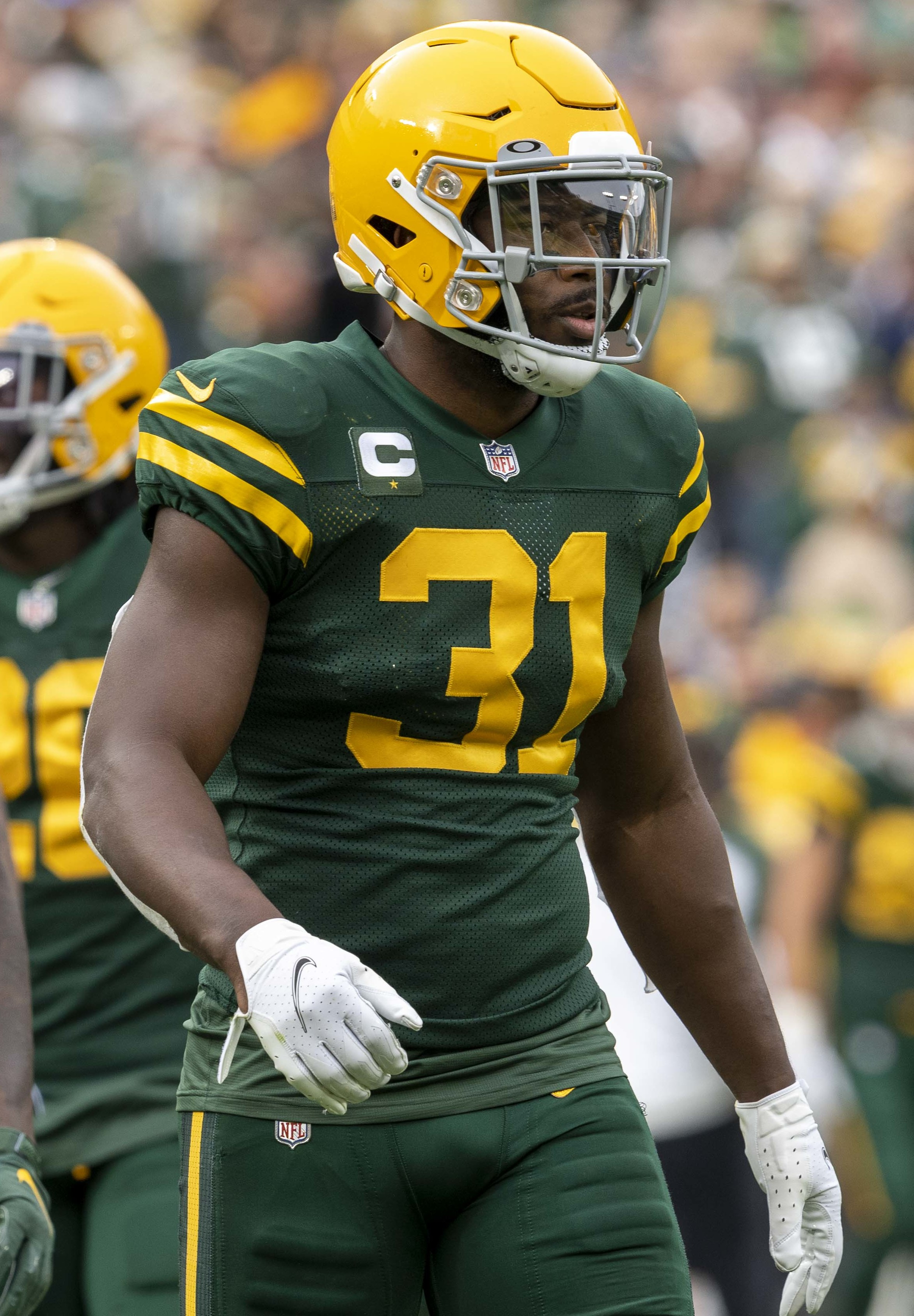
- Amos with the Green Bay Packers in 2021

Profile
- Position: Safety

Personal information
- Born: April 29, 1993 (age 33); Baltimore, Maryland, U.S.
- Listed height: 6 ft 0 in (1.83 m)
- Listed weight: 214 lb (97 kg)

Career information
- High school: Calvert Hall (Towson, Maryland)
- College: Penn State (2011–2014)
- NFL draft: 2015: 5th round, 142nd overall pick

Career history
- Chicago Bears (2015–2018); Green Bay Packers (2019–2022); New York Jets (2023); Houston Texans (2023); Jacksonville Jaguars (2024)*; San Francisco 49ers (2024)
- * Offseason or practice squad member only

Awards and highlights
- PFWA All-Rookie Team (2015)

Career NFL statistics
- Total tackles: 664
- Sacks: 6.0
- Forced fumbles: 3
- Fumble recoveries: 5
- Pass deflections: 49
- Interceptions: 10
- Defensive touchdowns: 1
- Stats at Pro Football Reference

Adrian Gerald Amos Jr. (born April 29, 1993) is an American professional football safety. He played college football for the Penn State Nittany Lions, was selected by the Chicago Bears in the fifth round of the 2015 NFL draft. He has also played in the NFL for the Green Bay Packers, New York Jets, and Houston Texans.

== Early life ==
Amos attended Calvert Hall College High School in Towson, Maryland. He was rated by Rivals.com as a three-star recruit. He originally committed to play college football at the University of Connecticut.

== College career ==
Amos played at Penn State from 2011 to 2014. As a true freshman, he played in all 13 games as a cornerback and on special teams. He recorded seven tackles and an interception. As a sophomore in 2012, Amos started all 12 games and recorded 44 tackles and two interceptions. As a junior in 2013, Amos again started all 12 games, splitting time between cornerback and safety. He finished the year with 50 tackles, one interception and 2.5 sacks. As a senior, he again started all 13 games, recording 42 tackles and three interceptions.

== Professional career ==
=== Pre-draft ===
On November 10, 2014, the Senior Bowl announced that Amos had accepted their invitation to play in the 2015 Senior Bowl. Prior to the Senior Bowl and NFL Combine, Amos was projected to be a fourth or fifth round pick and was ranked as the sixth best free safety prospect by NFLDraftScout.com. On January 24, 2015, Amos attended the Senior Bowl and recorded two solo tackles to help the North defeat the South 34–13. Amos attended the NFL combine and performed well, completing almost all of the combine drills, but chose to skip the bench press. His 40-yard dash time of 4.39s ranked seventh among all safeties and his 4.03s time in the three-cone drill ranked second amongst his position. He also finished in the top twenty among safeties at the combine in the 20-yard short shuttle and the 60-yard shuttle. On March 19, 2015, Amos opted to participate at Penn State's pro day, along with Mike Hull, Donovan Smith, Jesse James, Sam Ficken, Miles Dieffenbach, Deion Barnes, and three other teammates. He decided to perform the bench press, 40-yard dash, and positional drills for the team representatives and scouts from 19 NFL teams in attendance. He had an impressive performance overall and decreased his time in the 40-yard dash from 4.56s at the combine to 4.37s and 4.40s. Amos attended private visits or workouts for the Philadelphia Eagles and the Baltimore Ravens. At the conclusion of the pre-draft process, Amos was projected to be a second to fourth round pick by the majority of NFL draft experts and scouts. He was ranked the second best free safety prospect in the draft by NFLDraftScout.com and was ranked the 13th best safety by NFL analyst Charles Davis.

Pre-draft measurables
Height	Weight	Arm length	Hand span	40-yard dash	10-yard split	20-yard split	20-yard shuttle	Three-cone drill	Vertical jump	Broad jump	Bench press
6 ft 0 1/2 in (1.84 m)	218 lb (99 kg)	32 1/4 in (0.82 m)	9 1/8 in (0.23 m)	4.39 s	1.54 s	2.59 s	4.03 s	7.09 s	35.5 in (0.90 m)	10 ft 2 in (3.10 m)	21 reps
All values from NFL Combine/Penn State's Pro Day

=== Chicago Bears ===
Amos in 2018

==== 2015 ====
The Chicago Bears selected Amos in the fifth round (142nd overall) of the 2015 NFL draft. The Bears previously acquired the pick by trading wide receiver Brandon Marshall to the New York Jets. He was the eighth safety selected during the draft in 2016 and only one of three Penn State players drafted in 2016, along with Donovan Smith (second round, 34th overall) and Jesse James (fifth round, 160th overall). On May 5, 2015, the Bears signed Amos to a four-year, $2.51 million contract with a signing bonus of $232,280.

Throughout training camp, he competed with Brock Vereen and Sherrod Martin for the vacant free safety position left by the departure of Chris Conte during free agency. Head coach John Fox named Amos the starting free safety over Vereen after he had an impressive performance in the Bears' preseason-opener against the Green Bay Packers. He began the season alongside Antrel Rolle, the team's starting strong safety.

He made his professional regular season debut and first career start in the Bears' regular season-opener against the Packers and recorded five solo tackles in a 31–23 loss. On November 22, 2015, Amos recorded seven solo tackles and made his first career sack on Denver Broncos quarterback Brock Osweiler during a 17–15 loss. The following game, he collected a season-high nine combined tackles in a 17–13 victory over the Packers on Thursday Night Football. Amos started all 16 games in his rookie season and made 67 combined tackles (57 solo), two pass deflections, and a sack. At the end of his rookie season, Amos was selected on Pro Football Writers All-Rookie Team along with defensive lineman Eddie Goldman.

==== 2016 ====
He was in competition with rookie DeAndre Houston-Carson for the free safety position throughout training camp. He was named the starting free safety to begin the 2016 season, opposite strong safety Harold Jones-Quartey.

Amos started the Bears' season-opener against the Houston Texans and made five solo tackles during their 23–14 loss. On October 20, 2016, Amos recorded a season-high eight combined tackles in the Bears' 26–10 loss at the Packers. After starting 27 consecutive games to start his career, Amos missed a Week 13 matchup against the San Francisco 49ers with a foot injury. Amos finished the season with 65 combined tackles (57 solo) and five pass deflections in 15 games and 14 starts. Pro Football Focus gave him a grade of 80.6 for the 2016 season.

On April 26, 2016, Amos, along with tight end Zach Miller, were awarded the Brian Piccolo Award. Although the Chicago Bears finished 3–13, the defense finished seventh in passing defense and 15th in total defense. Amos failed to record an interception in his first two seasons and the Bears ranked 31st with only eight interceptions in 2016.

==== 2017 ====
During the Bears' training camp, Amos competed with Chris Prosinski and rookie Eddie Jackson for his job as starting free safety. He was named the backup to Jackson to start the 2017 season.

Amos played sparingly through the first three games and only logged 16 snaps on defense with no tackles. Amos became the starting strong safety, opposite Eddie Jackson, for Week 4 after Quintin Demps suffered a fractured forearm the previous game against the Pittsburgh Steelers and was placed on injured reserve. On September 28, 2017, Amos made his first start of the season and recorded eight combined tackles during a 45–13 loss at the Packers. On October 15, 2017, he recorded eight combined tackles, deflected two passes, and intercepted his first career pass off a pass attempt by Joe Flacco, returning it for a 90-yard touchdown during the Bears' 27–24 overtime victory over the Ravens. The interception he returned for a touchdown also marked the first touchdown of his career and came in the fourth quarter to put the Bears up 24–14. During a Week 10 matchup against the Packers, Amos tied his season-high of eight solo tackles in Chicago's 23–16 loss. Pro Football Focus gave Amos a grade of 92.3 through the first twelve games, which made him second amongst all safeties behind the Minnesota Vikings' safety Harrison Smith who was graded 94.2. On January 6, 2018, Amos recorded a season-high eleven tackles in the season finale against the Minnesota Vikings.

Amos finished the season with ten starts in thirteen games, recording 62 tackles, three passes defended, one interception, two forced fumbles (including a recovery), and a touchdown.

==== 2018 ====
On January 1, 2018, the Chicago Bears announced their decision to fire head coach John Fox after the Bears finished fourth in the NFC North with a 5–11 record. On January 8, 2018, the Chicago Bears announced their decision to hire Kansas City Chiefs offensive coordinator Matt Nagy as their new head coach. Head coach Matt Nagy elected to retain defensive coordinator Vic Fangio and also retained Amos and Eddie Jackson as the starting safety tandem.

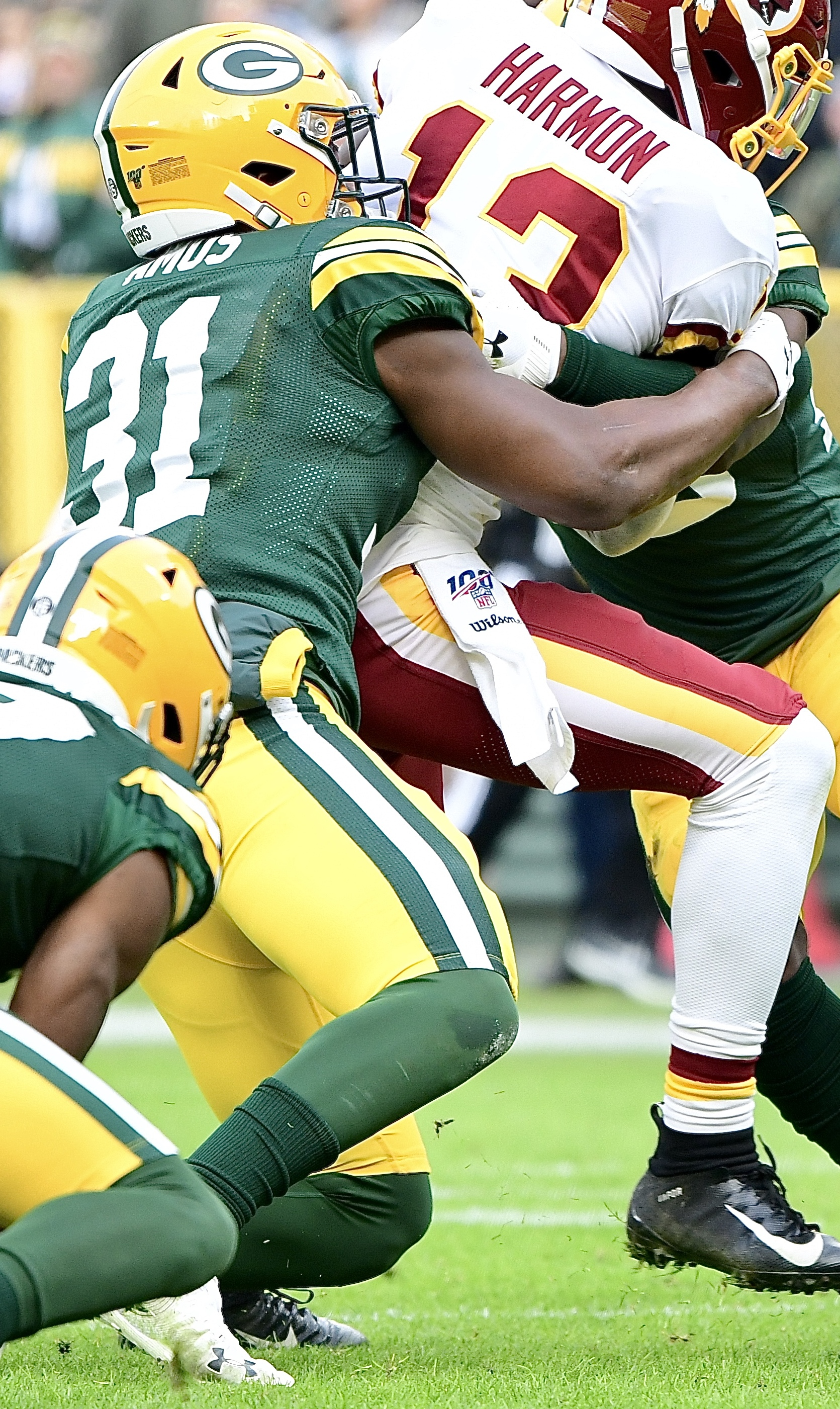
Amos (31) in 2019

In Week 6, Amos collected a season-high nine combined tackles and broke up a pass during a 31–28 loss at the Miami Dolphins. On November 4, 2018, Amos recorded seven combined tackles, a season-high three pass deflections, one sack, and intercepted a pass by Buffalo Bills quarterback Nathan Peterman during a 41–9 win at the Bills in Week 9. In Week 11, Amos made three solo tackles, a pass deflection, and intercepted a pass attempt by Vikings’ quarterback Kirk Cousins as the Bears defeated the Vikings 25–20. Amos started in all 16 games in 2018 and recorded 73 combined tackles (59 solo), nine passes defended, two interceptions, two sacks, and one fumble recovery.

=== Green Bay Packers ===
On March 14, 2019, Amos signed a four-year, $37 million contract with the Packers. In Week 1 against his former team, the Bears, Amos made his debut for the Packers. In the 10–3 win, Amos recorded five tackles and intercepted former teammate Mitchell Trubisky in the endzone. Amos's interception sealed a Packers victory. In Week 14 against the Washington Redskins, Amos recorded seven combined tackles, two pass deflections, sacked and intercepted a pass thrown by quarterback Dwayne Haskins during the 20–15 win. In the 2019 season, Amos finished with one sack, 77 total tackles, two interceptions, and eight passes defended.

In Week 7 of the 2020 season against the Texans, Amos recorded his first sack of the season on Deshaun Watson and later recovered a fumble lost by David Johnson late in the fourth quarter to seal a 35–20 Packers' win. In Week 10 against the Jacksonville Jaguars, Amos recorded his first interception of the season off a pass thrown by Jake Luton during the 24–20 win. In the 2020 season, Amos finished with two sacks, 83 total tackles, two interceptions, and nine passes defended.

In the 2021 season, Amos started in all 17 games. He finished with 93 total tackles, two interceptions, and eight passes defended.

In the 2022 season, Amos started in all 17 games. He finished with one sack, 102 total tackles, one interception, and five passes defended.

=== New York Jets ===
On June 13, 2023, Amos signed a one-year, $4 million contract with the New York Jets. He was released on December 2, 2023, at his request.

=== Houston Texans ===
On December 5, 2023, Amos was signed by the Houston Texans. In five games for Houston, Amos logged five combined tackles and one fumble recovery.

=== Jacksonville Jaguars ===
On August 6, 2024, Amos signed with the Jacksonville Jaguars. He was released on August 27.

=== San Francisco 49ers ===
On October 15, 2024, the San Francisco 49ers signed Amos to their practice squad. On November 11, Amos was released by the 49ers.

== NFL career statistics ==
=== Regular season ===
Year	Team	Games		Tackles				Interceptions						Fumbles	
Year	Team	GP	GS	Comb	Total	Ast	Sck	PD	Int	Yds	Avg	Lng	TDs	FF	FR
2015	CHI	16	16	67	57	10	1.0	2	0	0	0	0	0	0	0
2016	CHI	15	14	65	57	8	0.0	5	0	0	0	0	0	1	1
2017	CHI	13	10	69	62	7	0.0	3	1	90	90.0	90	1	2	1
2018	CHI	16	16	73	59	14	1.0	9	2	27	13.5	26	0	0	1
2019	GB	16	16	84	68	16	1.0	8	2	12	6.0	9	0	0	0
2020	GB	16	16	83	65	18	2.0	9	2	47	23.5	24	0	0	0
2021	GB	17	17	93	75	18	0.0	8	2	0	0	0	0	0	0
2022	GB	17	17	102	73	29	1.0	5	1	26	26.0	26	0	0	1
2023	NYJ	11	3	23	19	4	0.0	1	0	0	0	0	0	1	0
2023	HOU	5	0	5	4	1	0.0	0	0	0	0	0	0	0	1
Career		142	125	664	539	125	6.0	49	10	202	20.2	90	1	4	5

=== Postseason ===
Year	Team	Games		Tackles				Interceptions						Fumbles	
Year	Team	GP	GS	Comb	Total	Ast	Sck	PD	Int	Yds	Avg	Lng	TDs	FF	FR
2018	CHI	1	1	6	5	1	0.0	2	1	0	0.0	0	0	0	0
2019	GB	2	2	9	5	4	0.0	1	0	0	0.0	0	0	0	0
2020	GB	2	2	8	6	2	0.0	1	1	0	0.0	0	0	0	0
2021	GB	1	1	5	3	2	0.0	1	1	0	0.0	0	0	0	0
2023	HOU	2	0	1	1	0	0.0	0	0	0	0.0	0	0	0	0
Career		8	6	29	20	9	0.0	5	3	0	0.0	0	0	0	0

== Personal life ==
Amos is a Christian. Amos is the founder of The I'm Still Here Foundation, which raises awareness about Alzheimer's disease and helps underserved youth.
