= Tyler Davis (tight end) =

American football player (born 1997)

Profile
- Position: Tight end

Personal information
- Born: April 2, 1997 (age 29); North Bellmore, New York, U.S.
- Listed height: 6 ft 4 in (1.93 m)
- Listed weight: 252 lb (114 kg)

Career information
- High school: Wellington C. Mepham (North Bellmore)
- College: UConn (2015–2018); Georgia Tech (2019)
- NFL draft: 2020: 6th round, 206th overall pick

Career history
- Jacksonville Jaguars (2020); Indianapolis Colts (2021)*; Green Bay Packers (2021–2024); New England Patriots (2025)*; Birmingham Stallions (2026)
- * Offseason or practice squad member only

Career NFL statistics as of 2024
- Receptions: 8
- Receiving yards: 61
- Stats at Pro Football Reference

Tyler Davis (born April 2, 1997) is an American professional football tight end. He played college football for the UConn Huskies and Georgia Tech Yellow Jackets.

== College career ==
Davis began his collegiate career at Connecticut. After his freshman season, he transitioned from quarterback to tight end. During three seasons, Davis made 15 starts and had 47 catches for 500 yards and seven touchdowns. In 2018, he tied for 2nd in single-season history at UConn with six touchdown catches for a tight end, as well as ranking first on the team in touchdown receptions, tenth in the American Athletic Conference among all players, and first among tight ends with 6 in 2018 for the Huskies. He went to Georgia Tech as a graduate transfer in 2019. Davis caught 17 passes for 148 yards and a touchdown in 12 games (11 starts) for the Yellow Jackets.

== Professional career ==
Pre-draft measurables
Height	Weight	Arm length	Hand span	Wingspan	40-yard dash	10-yard split	20-yard split	20-yard shuttle	Three-cone drill	Vertical jump	Broad jump	Bench press
6 ft 4 3/8 in (1.94 m)	252 lb (114 kg)	32 5/8 in (0.83 m)	10 1/4 in (0.26 m)	6 ft 6 7/8 in (2.00 m)	4.71 s	1.64 s	2.59 s	4.43 s	7.19 s	32.5 in (0.83 m)	9 ft 3 in (2.82 m)	23 reps
All values from Pro Day

=== Jacksonville Jaguars ===
Davis was selected in the sixth round of the 2020 NFL draft with the 206th overall pick by the Jacksonville Jaguars.

On August 31, 2021, Davis was waived by the Jaguars.

=== Indianapolis Colts ===
On September 3, 2021, Davis was signed to the practice squad of the Indianapolis Colts.

=== Green Bay Packers ===
On September 28, 2021, Davis was signed to the Green Bay Packers' active roster off the Colts practice squad.

Davis re-signed with the Packers on March 15, 2023.

During a preseason game against the Cincinnati Bengals on August 11, 2023, Davis suffered a significant knee injury, later reported to be a torn ACL. The Packers placed him on injured reserve on August 21, 2023, ending his season.

On March 12, 2024, Davis re-signed with the Packers. He was placed on season-ending injured reserve on August 27.

=== New England Patriots ===
On July 30, 2025, Davis signed with the New England Patriots. He was released by the Patriots on August 6.

=== Birmingham Stallions ===
On January 26, 2025, Davis signed with the Birmingham Stallions of the United Football League (UFL).

== NFL career statistics ==
=== Regular season ===
Year	Team	Games		Receiving					Fumbles	
Year	Team	G	GS	Rec	Yds	Avg	Lng	TD	FUM	Lost
2020	JAX	8	0	0	0	0	0	0	0	0
2021	GB	14	0	4	35	8.8	22	0	0	0
2022	GB	17	1	4	61	7.6	23	0	0	0
Total		39	1	8	61	7.6	23	0	0	0
Source: pro-football-reference.com

=== Postseason ===
Year	Team	Games		Receiving					Fumbles	
Year	Team	G	GS	Rec	Yds	Avg	Lng	TD	FUM	Lost
2021	GB	1	0	0	0	0	0	0	0	0
Total		1	0	0	0	0	0	0	0	0
Source: pro-football-reference.com

== Personal life ==
Davis is the son of Steve and Cindy Davis and has two brothers, Bryan and Jake.
