= Ray Wilborn =

American gridiron football player (born 1997)

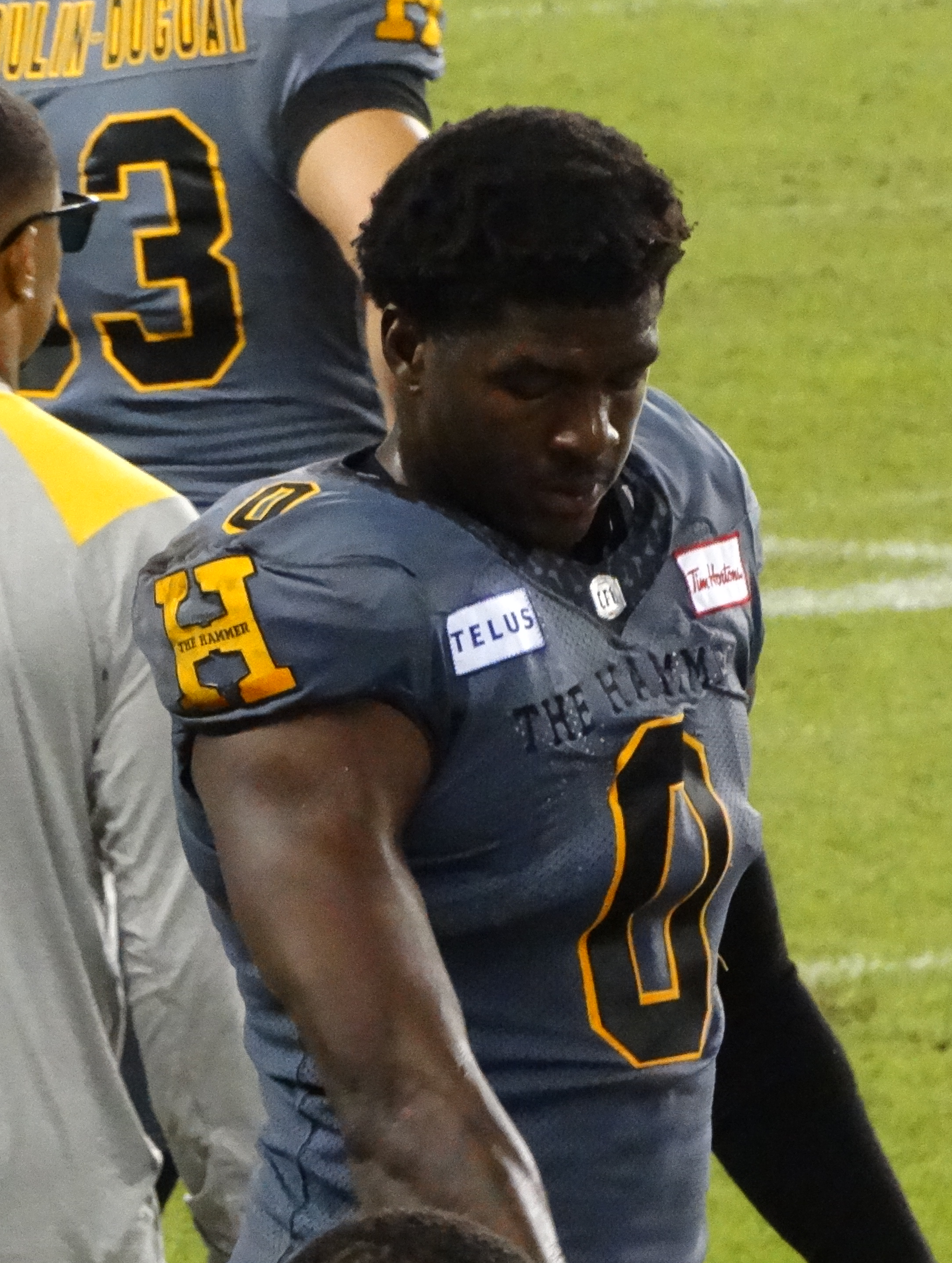
- Wilborn with the Hamilton Tiger-Cats in 2024

Profile
- Position: Linebacker

Personal information
- Born: April 1, 1997 (age 29); Lansing, Michigan, U.S.
- Listed height: 6 ft 3 in (1.91 m)
- Listed weight: 230 lb (104 kg)

Career information
- High school: J. W. Sexton (MI)
- College: Garden City CC; Ball State
- NFL draft: 2020: undrafted

Career history
- Atlanta Falcons (2020)*; Pittsburgh Steelers (2020)*; Green Bay Packers (2021–2022); Denver Broncos (2022–2023); New York Giants (2023)*; Hamilton Tiger-Cats (2024–2025)
- * Offseason or practice squad member only

Career NFL statistics
- Games played: 2
- Stats at Pro Football Reference
- Stats at CFL.ca

Rayshawn Kyli Wilborn (born April 1, 1997) is an American professional football linebacker. He most recently played for the Hamilton Tiger-Cats of the Canadian Football League (CFL). He played college football at Garden City Community College and Ball State and was signed by the Atlanta Falcons as an undrafted free agent in 2020. He has also been a member of the Pittsburgh Steelers, Green Bay Packers, Denver Broncos and New York Giants.

== Early life ==
Wilborn was born on April 1, 1997, in Lansing, Michigan. He attended J. W. Sexton High School where played high school football. He earned four varsity letters in football and was twice named first-team all-state. Wilborn was a two-time captain and as a junior set the school record for single-season sacks with 18. He also played on offense, and as a senior caught 14 touchdown passes and recorded 970 receiving yards.

== College career ==
Wilborn began his college football career at Garden City Community College in 2016, helping them win the national championship. In two seasons with Garden City, he posted 120 tackles, 8.5 sacks and 23 TFLs while appearing in 23 games.

In 2018, Wilborn transferred to Ball State. Joining the school in January, he started all 12 games for the football team as an outside linebacker, leading them in both TFLs (10.5) and tackles (83). He made his first career interception against Notre Dame and later made one against NIU, the latter of which he returned for 43 yards.

As a senior in 2019, Wilborn changed from linebacker to safety after the team needed a player at the position. That season, he started all 12 games and posted 83 tackles, placing third on the team. He also made two interceptions, against NC State and Eastern Michigan, and tied for fourth on Ball State with six pass breakups.

== Professional career ==
Pre-draft measurables
Height	Weight	Arm length	Hand span
6 ft 3 1/2 in (1.92 m)	230 lb (104 kg)	32 1/4 in (0.82 m)	9 5/8 in (0.24 m)
All values from Pro Day

=== Atlanta Falcons ===
Although projected by some as a seventh round pick in the 2020 NFL draft, Wilborn ultimately went unselected, and afterwards was signed by the Atlanta Falcons as an undrafted free agent. He was waived at the final roster cuts, on September 5.

=== Pittsburgh Steelers ===
On October 23, 2020, he was signed to the practice squad of the Pittsburgh Steelers, only to be released on November 17.

=== Green Bay Packers ===
In January 2021, Wilborn was signed by the Green Bay Packers to a future contract. He was placed on the reserve/COVID-19 list on July 24, and was then activated on August 4. Wilborn was released at the end of August, during the final roster cuts, and was afterwards brought back as a member of the practice squad. He was placed on the COVID-19 list for a second time on December 31, later receiving activation on January 5, 2022. Wilborn was signed to a future contract again on January 25, 2022, after spending the entire 2021 season on the practice squad. He was released by the Packers on August 30, 2022, at the final roster cuts.

=== Denver Broncos ===
Wilborn received a tryout from the Denver Broncos in November 2022, and was afterwards signed to their practice squad on November 22. He was elevated to the active roster for the Broncos' Week 17 game with the Kansas City Chiefs, and made his NFL debut in the loss, appearing on 14 special teams snaps. He signed a reserve/future contract on January 9, 2023. He was waived on August 14, 2023.

=== New York Giants ===
On August 15, 2023, Wilborn was claimed off waivers by the New York Giants. He was waived on August 29.

=== Hamilton Tiger-Cats ===
Wilborn signed with the Hamilton Tiger-Cats on February 28, 2024. He was released on September 29, 2025.
