= Jake Hansen =

Jake Hansen or Hanson may refer to:

- Jake Hansen (American football) (born 1998), American football player
- Jake Hansen (ice hockey) (born 1989), American professional ice hockey player
- Jake Hansen, bass player for the post-hardcore band Drop Dead, Gorgeous
- Jake Hanson (Beverly Hills, 90210), fictional character in the Beverly Hills, 90210 franchise
- Jake Hanson (American football) (born 1997), American football offensive lineman
