= Ben Braden =

American football player (born 1994)

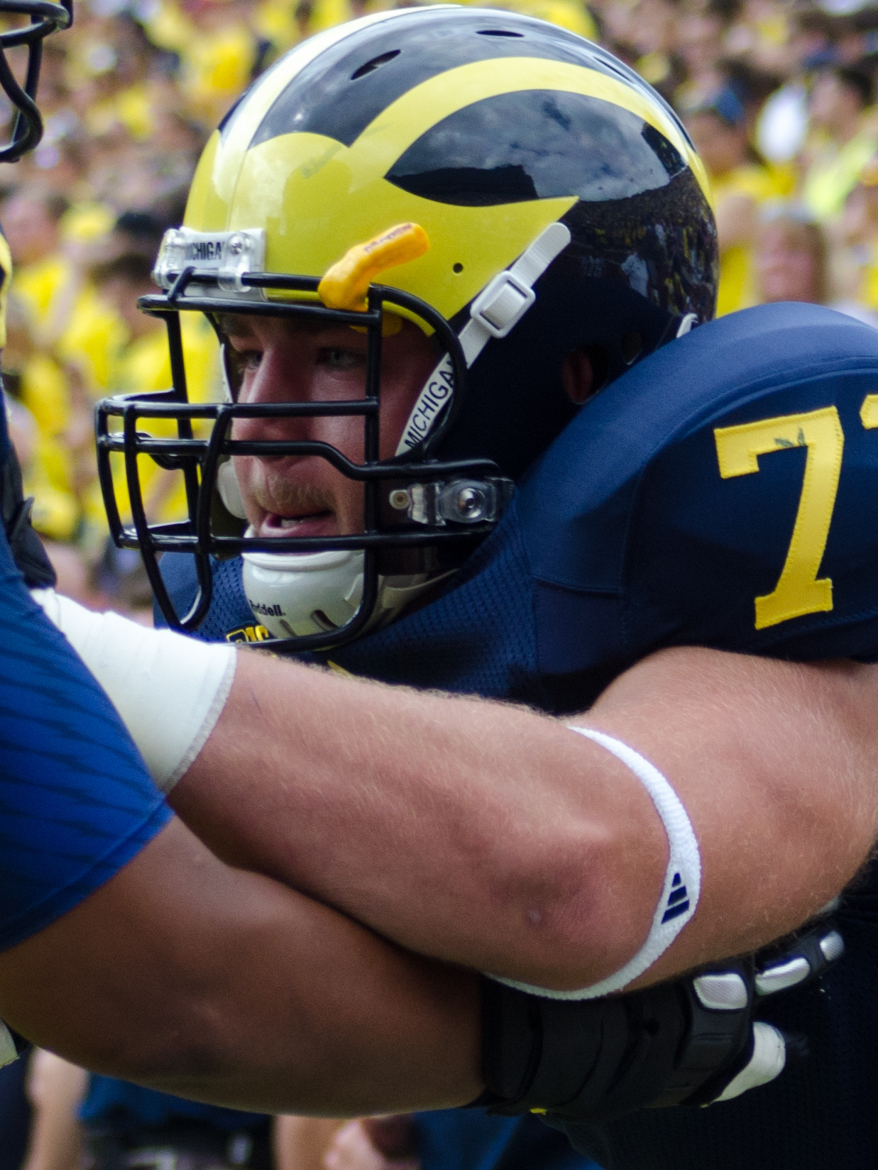
- Braden with the Michigan Wolverines in 2013

No. 69, 70, 64
- Position: Guard

Personal information
- Born: March 9, 1994 (age 32); Rockford, Michigan, U.S.
- Listed height: 6 ft 6 in (1.98 m)
- Listed weight: 329 lb (149 kg)

Career information
- High school: Rockford
- College: Michigan (2012–2016)
- NFL draft: 2017: undrafted

Career history
- New York Jets (2017–2019); Green Bay Packers (2019)*; New York Jets (2019); New England Patriots (2020)*; Green Bay Packers (2020–2021); Denver Broncos (2022)*
- * Offseason or practice squad member only

Awards and highlights
- Second-team All-Big Ten (2016)

Career NFL statistics
- Games played: 16
- Stats at Pro Football Reference

Benjamin Alan Braden (born March 9, 1994) is an American former professional football player who was a guard in the National Football League (NFL). He played college football for the Michigan Wolverines. He is currently the fueler for the number 66 Meyer Shank Racing entry in the Indycar Series.

== Early life ==
Braden was born on March 9, 1994 in Rockford, Michigan. From an early age, Braden played hockey intending to play professionally as a goalie. He admired Czech ice hockey player Dominik Hašek. By the time Braden began junior high school, he settled on playing football. Braden played as a tackle with the Rockford Rams, including at starting right tackle during his sophomore and junior seasons in 2010 and 2011. During his senior season in 2012, Braden was named to the AP Michigan all-state first team. The Detroit Free Press named Braden to the Detroit News Blue Chip List. He was rated a three-star recruit by 247Sports. Braden earned three letters during his freshman, sophomore and junior seasons. This led to four offers from Wisconsin, Syracuse, Michigan State and Michigan.

== College career ==
Braden committed to Michigan, redshirting the 2012 season. During the 2013 season, Braden earned his first varsity letter despite only appearing in two games as a reserve offensive lineman. In his junior season in 2014, Braden started in all 12 games, playing as a right tackle. His performance earned him a second letter. During his senior season in 2015, Braden was assigned guard position and started in all 13 games. His senior season saw him earn his third varsity letter. During his final season in 2016, Braden played left guard in four games. He later started 7 games at left tackle, earning All-Big Ten second team honors. He graduated in 2016 with a degree in general studies.

== Professional career ==
Pre-draft measurables
| Height | Weight | Arm length | Hand span | 40-yard dash | 10-yard split | 20-yard split | 20-yard shuttle | Three-cone drill | Vertical jump | Broad jump | Bench press |
|---|---|---|---|---|---|---|---|---|---|---|---|
| 6 ft 6 1/2 in (1.99 m) | 329 lb (149 kg) | 34 in (0.86 m) | 9 7/8 in (0.25 m) | 5.04 s | 1.78 s | 2.92 s | 4.90 s | 7.85 s | 28.0 in (0.71 m) | 8 ft 6 in (2.59 m) | 25 reps |
All values from NFL Combine

=== New York Jets (first stint) ===
Braden signed with the New York Jets as an undrafted free agent on May 7, 2017. He was waived on September 2, 2017, and was signed to the practice squad the next day. He signed a reserve/future contract with the Jets on January 1, 2018.

Braden made the Jets initial 53-man roster in 2018, but was later waived on September 12, 2018, and was re-signed to the practice squad. He was promoted to the active roster on November 28, 2018.

On August 31, 2019, Braden was waived by the Jets and signed to the practice squad the next day. He was released on September 10.

=== Green Bay Packers ===
On September 12, 2019, Braden was signed to the Green Bay Packers' practice squad. He was released by Green Bay on November 7.

=== New York Jets (second stint) ===
On November 13, 2019, Braden was signed to the New York Jets' practice squad. He was promoted to the active roster on December 28. Braden was waived by the Jets on August 3, 2020.

=== New England Patriots ===
On August 17, 2020, Braden was signed by the New England Patriots. He was waived by the Patriots on September 5.

=== Green Bay Packers (second stint) ===
Braden was signed to the Green Bay Packers practice squad on October 21, 2020. He was promoted to the active roster on October 24. He was waived on October 26, and re-signed to the team's practice squad two days later. He was elevated to the active roster on November 5, December 5, and December 12 for the team's Weeks 9, 13, and 14 games against the San Francisco 49ers, Philadelphia Eagles, and Detroit Lions, and reverted to the practice squad after each game. He was promoted to the active roster on January 2, 2021.

On August 31, 2021, Packers released Braden as part of their final roster cuts, and he was subsequently re-signed to the practice squad the next day. Braden was elevated to the active roster on October 28. He was promoted to the active roster on November 23, and released on January 10, 2022, following the conclusion of the regular season. Braden was re-signed back to the practice squad the next day.

=== Denver Broncos ===
On March 14, 2022, Braden signed with the Denver Broncos. He was waived/injured by the Broncos on August 15.
