= Christian Uphoff =

American football player (born 1998)

Profile
- Position: Safety

Personal information
- Born: January 22, 1998 (age 28); Peoria, Illinois, U.S.
- Listed height: 6 ft 3 in (1.91 m)
- Listed weight: 209 lb (95 kg)

Career information
- High school: Washington Community (Washington, Illinois)
- College: Illinois State
- NFL draft: 2021: undrafted

Career history
- Green Bay Packers (2021)*; BC Lions (2023)*
- * Offseason or practice squad member only

Christian Uphoff (born January 22, 1998) is an American professional football safety. He played college football for the Illinois State Redbirds.

== Early life ==
Uphoff grew up in Washington, Illinois, and attended Washington Community High School.

== College career ==
Uphoff was a member of the Illinois State Redbirds for four seasons, redshirting his true first year. He was named honorable mention All-Missouri Valley Football Conference as a redshirt sophomore after breaking up seven passes with one interception. Although he originally announced that he would play redshirt senior season, which was to be played in the spring due to COVID-19, Uphoff later decided to opt out and prepare for the 2021 NFL Draft.

== Professional career ==
Uphoff signed with the Green Bay Packers as an undrafted free agent shortly after the conclusion of the 2021 NFL draft. On August 31, 2021, Packers released Uphoff as part of their final roster cuts.

On December 29, 2022, Uphoff signed with the BC Lions of the Canadian Football League (CFL). On June 4, 2023, Uphoff was released by the Lions.

== Personal life ==
Uphoff is a member of the Church of Jesus Christ of Latter-day Saints and was baptized by his teammate Bronson Kaufusi on August 30, 2021.
