= Joe Fortunato (long snapper) =

American football player (born 1994)

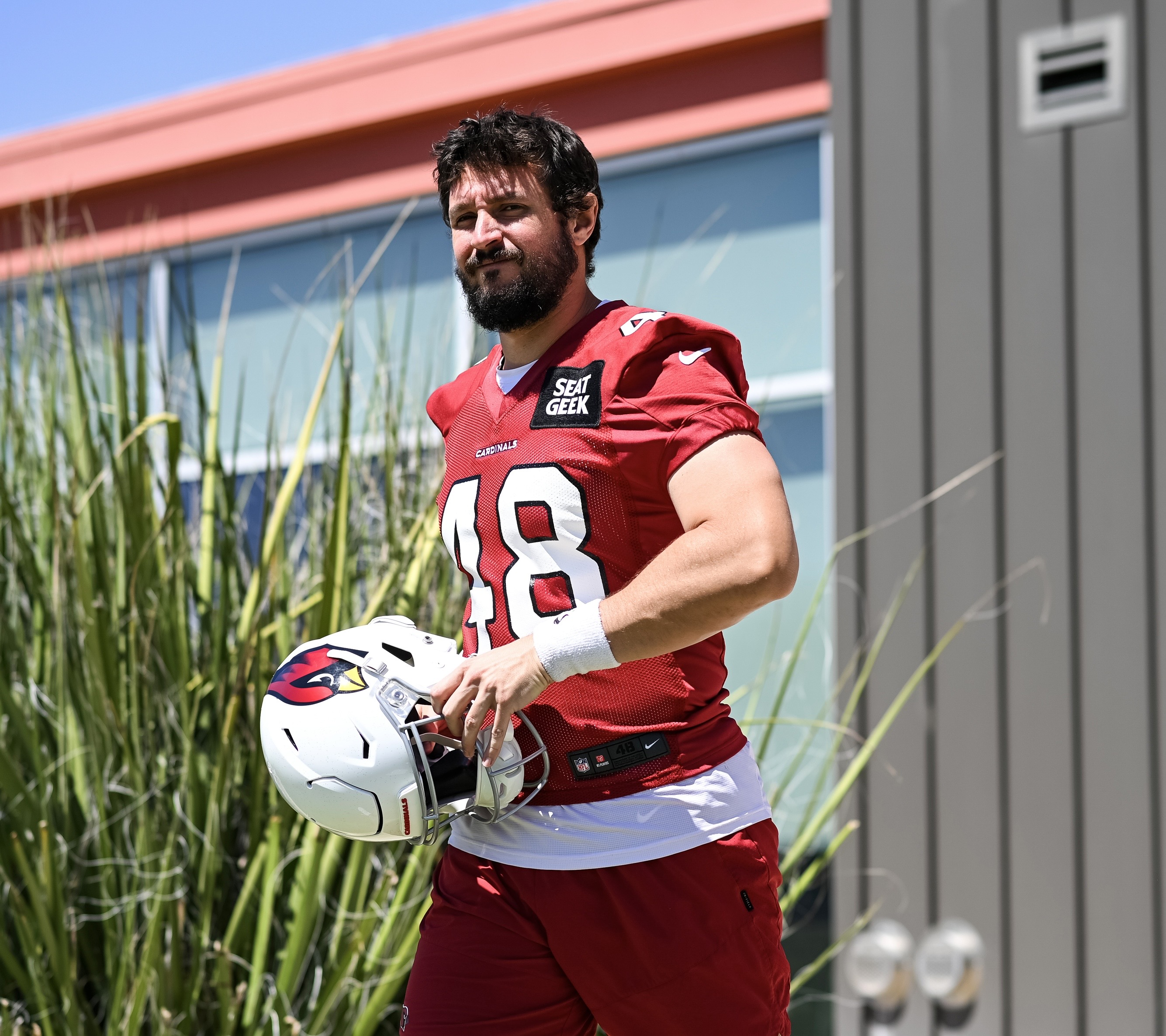
- Fortunato with the Arizona Cardinals in 2023

Profile
- Position: Long snapper

Personal information
- Born: April 7, 1994 (age 32); Linwood, New Jersey, U.S.
- Listed height: 6 ft 5 in (1.96 m)
- Listed weight: 240 lb (109 kg)

Career information
- High school: Mainland Regional (NJ) (Atlantic County, New Jersey)
- College: Delaware (2012–2015)
- NFL draft: 2016: undrafted

Career history
- Indianapolis Colts (2017)*; Dallas Cowboys (2020)*; Green Bay Packers (2021)*; Denver Broncos (2022)*; Arizona Cardinals (2023)*
- * Offseason or practice squad member only
- Stats at Pro Football Reference

Joe Fortunato (born April 7, 1994) is an American professional football long snapper. He played college football at Delaware and has spent time with the Indianapolis Colts, Dallas Cowboys, Green Bay Packers, Denver Broncos, and Arizona Cardinals.

== Early life and college ==
Fortunato was born on April 7, 1994, in Linwood, New Jersey. He attended Mainland Regional High School, competing in football, baseball, and basketball. On the football team, he played quarterback, tight end, and long snapper, helping them win the state championship in 2008. In baseball, he was a first baseman and pitcher, and led his school to a 13–5 mark as a senior. He was a forward in basketball and helped them achieve a 19–4 record in his only year with the team. He was a National Honor Society Student.

Fortunato enrolled at the University of Delaware. As a true freshman in 2012, he earned the long snapper duties and appeared in all 11 games. He recorded two tackles on punts. As a sophomore, he again played in all 11 games. As a junior, Fortunato added long snapping duties for field goals, as he previously only was on punts. He made two tackles in the season. He appeared in every game as a senior.

== Professional career ==
Fortunato went unselected in the 2016 NFL draft. He received a tryout with the Philadelphia Eagles, but was not signed.

On March 23, 2017, he was signed by the Indianapolis Colts, but was waived on May 1. In 2018, he received a tryout with the Atlanta Falcons, but was not signed. He was invited to mini-camp with the New York Giants in 2019, but was not given a contract.

On April 30, 2020, after competing in the specialists combine in 2020, Fortunato was signed by the Dallas Cowboys, but was released on August 1.

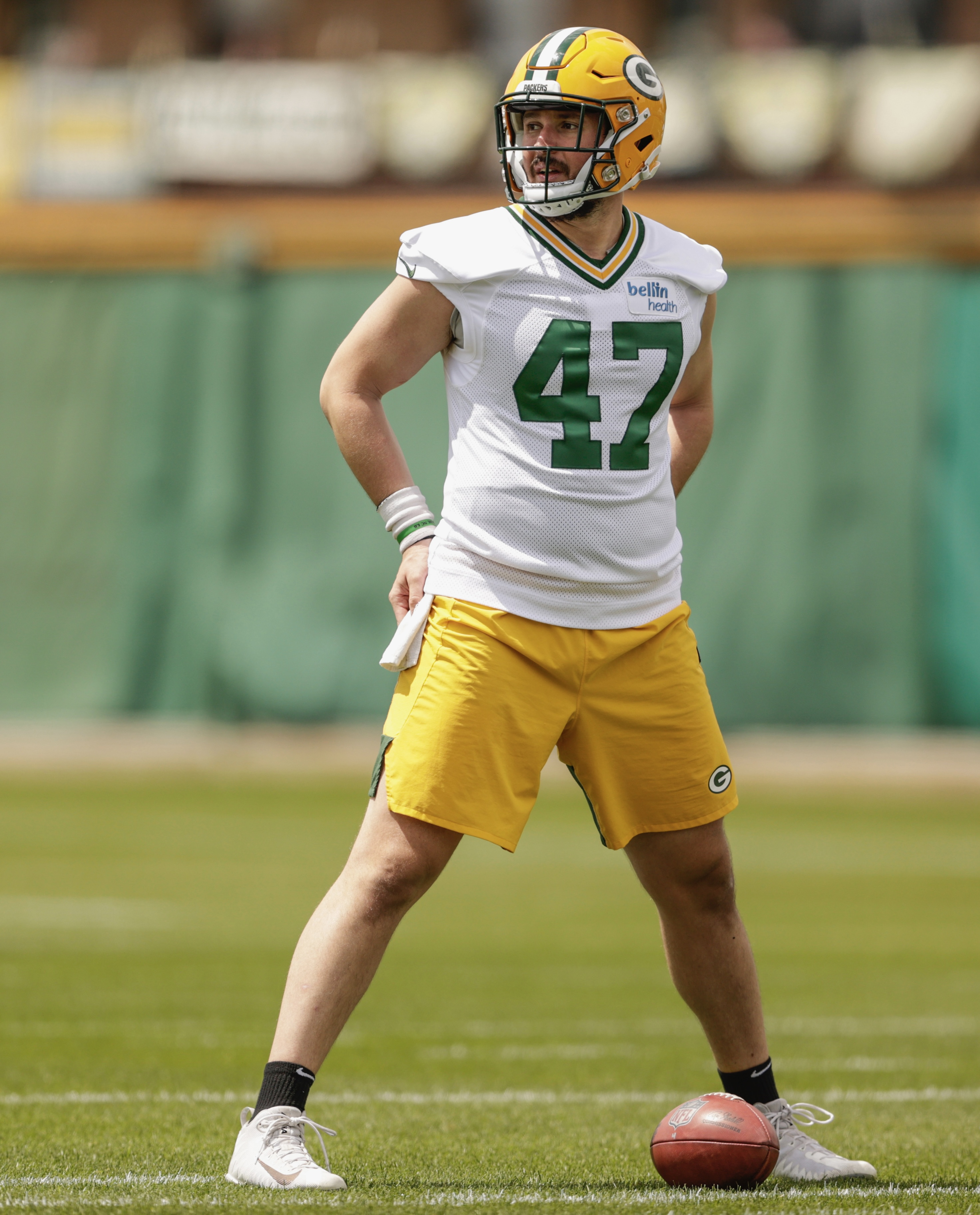
Fortunato in Green Bay 2021

On March 24, 2021, he was signed by the Green Bay Packers, and was released during training camp on August 5, 2021.

On October 12, 2022, Fortunato was signed to the Denver Broncos' practice squad, but was released three days later.

Fortunato signed a reserve/future contract with the Arizona Cardinals on January 11, 2023. On June 6, Fortunato was released by the Cardinals after the team re–signed Aaron Brewer.
